= 2025 Westmeath Senior Hurling Championship =

- Dates: Jul 18 - Oct 27 2025
- Teams: 6
- Sponsor: Slevin's Coaches
- Champions: Castletown Geoghegan (16th title); Aonghus Clarke (captain); Alan Mangan (manager)
- Runners-up: Lough Lene Gaels; Tommy Doyle (captain); Joey Williams (manager)
- Relegated: Castlepollard

Tournament statistics
- Matches played: 18
- Goals scored: 59 (3.28 per match)
- Points scored: 784 (43.56 per match)
- Top scorer(s): Niall O'Brien (8-71)

The 2025 Westmeath Senior Hurling Championship was the 121st staging of the Westmeath Senior Hurling Championship.

A total of six teams contested the Westmeath Senior Hurling Championship. All six teams enter the round-robin stage, playing each other once, guaranteeing at least five championship games. The first round draws of games were streamed live via YouTube on April 3, with the full schedule released on Facebook.

Fr Daltons were promoted to the championship as last year's Senior B winners, replacing St Oliver Plunkett's GAA who were relegated last year.

Castletown Geoghegan enter the championship as defending champions, defeating Lough Lene Gaels 1-27 - 2-17 last year's final. Castlepollard. Clonkill, and Raharney round out the field.

Castlepollard were relegated to Senior B, assuring Fr Daltons became the first promoted Senior B team to avoid immediate relegation since its inception.

The final has been played at Cusack Park in Mullingar between defending champions Castletown Geoghegan and Lough Lene Gaels in a rematch of last year's final. Castletown Geoghegan won the contest 3-15 - 2-9 after a replay to retain their championship for the first time since 1958, their third in four years, and sixteenth overall.

== Group stage ==
Advance to final Advance to semi-finals Relegated to Senior 'B'

Team	Matches				Score			Pts
Team	Pld	W	D	L	For	Against	Diff	Pts
Castletown Geoghegan	5	5	0	0	163	82	81	10
Lough Lene Gaels	5	4	0	1	126	95	31	8
Raharney	5	3	0	2	106	89	17	6
Clonkill	5	1	1	3	91	122	-31	3
Fr Dalton's	5	1	1	3	114	151	-37	3
Castlepollard	5	0	0	5	70	130	-60	0

=== Fixtures ===
Jul 18 Round 1	Clonkill	1-19 - 2-09	Castlepollard	Kinnegad
	Robert Cleary (0-6), Niall Mitchell (0-6), Oisin Murray (1-2), Luke Loughlin (0-3), Jordy Smyth (0-2)	Report	Danny McCormack (0-7), Joe Rabbit (1-0), Colm Dermody (1-0), D O'Leary (0-2)	Referee: Ken Gunning

Jul 18 Round 1	Castletown Geoghegan	0-28 - 3-17	Lough Lene Gaels	TEG Cusack Park
	Niall O'Brien (0-12), David O'Reilly (0-5), Aonghus Clarke (0-4), Dean Slevin (0-2), Liam Varley (0-2), Peter Clarke (0-1), Jack Gallagher (0-1), Peter Murphy (0-1)	Report	David Williams (0-8), Brendan Boyle (1-1), Tommy Doyle (1-1), Jordan Williams (1-1), Derek McNicholas (0-2), Shane Williams (0-2), John Egan (0-1)	Referee: Barry Kelly

Jul 18 Round 1	Fr Dalton's	2-07 - 2-26	Raharney	Shandonagh GAA
	Owen McCabe (1-2), Jack Duncan (1-0), Ciaran Clear (0-1), Conair Martin (0-1), Ronan McLoughlin(0-1), Eoin Nally (0-1)	Report	Killian Doyle (1-10), Eoin Keyes (1-5), Eamon Cunneen (0-4), Eoghan Ahearne (0-3), Rory Keyes (0-2), Joey Boyle (0-1), Conor McKeogh (0-1)	Referee: Sean Carroll

Aug 2 Round 2	Castlepollard	0-13 - 3-27	Castletown Geoghegan	TEG Cusack Park
	Darragh McCormack (0-7), Eoin English (0-2), Conor Gaffney (0-2), Conor Sheridan (0-2)	Report	Niall O'Brien (2-9), Dean Slevin (1-1), Aonghus Clarke (0-3), Peter Clarke (0-3), Jack Gallagher (0-3), Peter Murphy (0-3), Liam Varley (0-2), Morgan Gavigan (0-1), Odhran Gavigan (0-1), Jack Murphy (0-1)	Referee: James McGrath

Aug 3 Round 2	Lough Lene Gaels	1-23 - 1-14	Fr Dalton's	TEG Cusack Park
	David Williams (0-8), Marcus Kennedy (0-5), Aaron Kennedy 1-2, Eoin Daly (0-3), Derek McNicholas (0-2), Shane Williams (0-2), John Egan (0-1)	Report	Owen McCabe (0-9), Chris Martin (1-2), Jack Kearney (0-1), Patrick Kiernan (0-1), Eoin Nally (0-1)	Referee: Barry Nea

Aug 3 Round 2	Raharney	1-17 - 1-12	Clonkill	TEG Cusack Park
	Killian Doyle (1-5), Eoghan Ahern (0-4), Joey Boyle (0-2), Cormac Boyle (0-1), Eamonn Cunneen (0-1), Gary Greville (0-1), Callum McKeogh (0-1), Joe Mulvaney (0-1)	Report	Luke Loughlin (1-3), Peader Scally (0-5), Robert Cleary (0-1), Brian Gaffney (0-1), Andrew Shaw (0-1), Jordy Smyth (0-1)	Referee: Barry Kelly

Aug 16 Round 3	Lough Lene Gaels	2-19 - 1-14	Raharney	TEG Cusack Park
	David Williams (0-10), Aaron Kennedy (1-2), Marcus Kennedy (1-1), Jason Malone, Shane Williams (0-2), Eoin Daly (0-1), John Egan (0-1)	Report	Killian Doyle (0-8), Conor McKeogh (1-0), Joey Boyle (0-1), Darren Finn (0-1), David Hickey (0-1), Eoin Keyes (0-1), Rory Keyes (0-1)	Referee: Alfie Devine

Aug 17 Round 3	Castlepollard	1-14 - 3-14	Fr Dalton's	TEG Cusack Park
	Allan Devine (1-4), Andrew Dermody (0-3), Eoin English (0-1), Conor Gaffney (0-1), Darragh McCormack (0-1), Dylan O'Leary (0-1), Joe Rabitt (0-1), Darragh Tierney (0-1)	Report	Owen McCabe (1-6_, John Gillgian (1-2), Jack Duncan (1-1), Colm O'Roarke (0-2), Brian McCabe (0-1), Jack Kearney (0-1), Ronan McLoughlin (0-1)	Referee: Barry Nea

Aug 17 Round 3	Castletown Geoghegan	6-26 - 0-11	Clonkill	TEG Cusack Park
	Niall O'Brien (3-11), David O'Reilly, Aonghus Clarke (0-5), Peter Clarke (1-2), Liam Varley (0-2), Shane Clavin (0-1), Jack Gallagher (0-1), Dean Slevin (0-1)		Luke Loughlin (0-4), Robert Cleary (0-1), Andrew Shaw (0-1), Jordy Smyth (0-1)	Referee: James McGrath

Aug 30 Round 4	Fr Dalton's	0-15 - 2-24	Castletown Geoghegan	Killucan GAA
				Referee: Jimmy Greville

Aug 31 Round 4	Raharney	2-14 - 0-11	Castlepollard	TEG Cusack Park
	Ciaran Doyle (1-3), Killian Doyle (0-5), Eoin Keyes (1-0), Callum McKeogh (0-3), Eamonn Cunneen (0-2), Rory Keyes (0-1)	Report	D McCormack (0-4), Allan Devine (0-4), Darragh Tierney (0-2), Andrew Dermody (0-1)	Referee: Barry Nea

Aug 31 Round 4	Clonkill	1-16 - 0-20	Lough Lene Gaels	TEG Cusack Park
	Peader Scally (1-6), Luke Loughlin (0-5), Oisin Murray (0-4), Brian Gaffney (0-1)	Report	David Williams (0-12), Shane Williams (0-4), Aaron Kennedy (0-2), Tommy Doyle (0-1), Derek McNicholas (0-1)	Referee: James McGrath

Sep 14 Round 5	Clonkill	2-17 - 3-14	Fr Dalton's	Kinnegad GAA
	Peader Scally (2-9), Oisin Murray (0-3), Andrew Shaw (0-2), Micheal McGrath (0-1), Luke Loughlin (0-1), Ciaran Nolam (0-1)		Owen McCabe (0-8), John Gilligan (1-3), Jack Duncan (0-1), Ronan Hanley (0-1), Colm O'Roarke (0-1)	Referee: Kenneth Gunning

Sep 14 Round 5	Castletown Geoghegan	3-16 - 0-17	Raharney	TEG Cusack Park
	Niall O'Brien (1-8), Liam Varley (0-4), Johnny Bermingham (1-0), Connor Murphy (1-0), Aonghus Clarke (0-2), Shane Clavin (0-1), Jack Gallagher (0-1)		Killian Doyle (0-7), Eamonn Cunneen (0-3), Eoin Keyes (0-2), Callum McKeogh (0-2), Darren Finn (0-1), Rory Keyes (0-1), Brian McGrath (0-1)	Referee: Barry Kelly

Sep 14 Round 5	Castlepollard	1-11 - 3-20	Lough Lene Gaels	Killucan GAA
	Darragh Tierney (0-6), Darragh McCormack (1-3), Aaron Dermody (0-1), Joe Rabbitt (0-1)		David Williams (0-8), Marcus Kennedy (2-2), Tommy Doyle (1-0), Michael Daly (0-3), Aaron Kennedy (0-2), Shane Williams (0-2), Brendan Boyle (0-1), Thomas Kennedy (0-1), Derek McNicholas (0-1)	Referee: Barry Nea

== Knockout stage ==
Semifinals
2	Lough Lene Gaels	2-18
3	Raharney	2-17

Final
1	Castletown Geoghegan	1-23. 3-15 (R)
Lough Lene Gaels	2-20, 2-9

=== Fixtures ===
Oct 5 Semi-Final	Lough Lene Gaels	2-18 - 2-17	Raharney	TEG Cusack Park
	David Williams (1-12), Derek McNicolas (1-1), Marcus Kennedy (0-2), Shane Williams (0-1), Tommy Doyle (0-1), Aaron Kennedy (0-1)		Killian Doyle (0-11), Eoin Keyes (1-1), Ciaran Boyle (1-0), Eamonn Cuneen (0-2), Devin Hill (0-1), David Hickey (0-1), Rob Coyne (0-1)	Referee: Alfie Devine

Oct 19 Final	Castletown Geoghegan	1-23 - 2-20	Lough Lene Gaels	TEG Cusack Park
	Niall O'Brien (0-15), David O'Reilly (0-5), Peter Murphy (0-1), Shane Clavin (0-1), Jack Murphy (0-1)	Report	David Williams (1-12), Tommy Doyle (1-0), Marcus Kennedy (0-3), Eoin Daly (0-2), Micheál Daly (0-1), Brendan Doyle (0-1), Aaron Kennedy (0-1)	Referee: Barry Nea

Oct 27 Replay	Castletown Geoghegan	3-15 - 2-9	Lough Lene Gaels	TEG Cusack Park
	Niall O'Brien (0-7), Liam Varley (1-1), Shane Clavin (1-0), David O'Reilly (1-0), Peter Clarke (0-3), Aonghus Clarke (0-2), Jack Gallagher (0-2)	Report	David Williams (2-6), Tommy Doyle (0-1), Shane Williams (0-1), Daragh Qamar (0-1),	Referee: Barry Nea

== Top scorers ==
Overall

Rank	Player	Club	Tally	Total	Games	Average
1	Niall O'Brien	Castletown Geoghegan	8-71	95	7	13.57
2	David Williams	Lough Lene Gaels	4-76	76	88	11
3	Killian Doyle	Raharney	2-46	52	6	8.67
3	Owen McCabe	Fr Daltons	2-35	41	4	8.2
5	Darragh McCormack	Castlepollard	1-22	25	5	5
