= 2023 Westmeath Senior Hurling Championship =

Hurling competition

- Dates: July 1 - October 8 2023
- Teams: 6
- Sponsor: Slevin's Coaches
- Champions: Raharney (15th title); Robbie Greville (captain); Ger Flanagan (manager)
- Runners-up: Lough Lene Gaels; Phillip Reilly (captain); Joey Williams (manager)
- Relegated: Fr Daltons

Tournament statistics
- Matches played: 17
- Goals scored: 61 (3.588 per match)
- Points scored: 687 (40.4 per match)
- Top scorer(s): Niall O'Brien (2-66)

The 2023 Westmeath Senior Hurling Championship was the 119th staging of the Westmeath Senior Hurling Championship since its establishment by the Westmeath County Board in 1903.

Fr Daltons were promoted to the championship as Senior 'B' Hurling champions, replacing relegated Cullion from the previous year.

A total of six teams contest the Westmeath Senior Hurling Championship. Castletown Geoghegan enter the championship as the defending champions. Castlepollard, Clonkill, Fr Daltons, Lough Lene Gaels, and Raharney round out the field.

Fr Daltons were relegated from Senior 'A' after one season, while St Oliver Plunketts were promoted from Senior 'B' for next year.

The final at TEG Cusack Park in Mullingar between Lough Lene Gaels and Raharney, was their first meeting in a decider since 1992. Raharney won the final for their first county championship since 2021, and their 15th overall.

== Results ==
=== Group stage ===
Advance to final Advance to semi-finals Relegated to Senior 'B'

Team	Matches				Score			Pts
Team	Pld	W	D	L	For	Against	Diff	Pts
Raharney	5	4	0	1	113	87	26	8
Castletown Geoghegan	5	4	0	1	122	105	17	8
Lough Lene Gaels	5	3	0	2	106	91	15	6
Clonkill	5	2	0	3	114	88	26	4
Castlepollard	5	2	0	3	83	103	-20	4
Fr Daltons	5	0	0	5	70	134	-64	0

==== Fixtures ====
July 1 Round 1	Lough Lene Gaels	1-16 - 0-15	Clonkill	TEG Cusack Park
	David Williams (0-10) Jason Malone (1-0) Derek McNicholas (0-2) Eoin Daly (0-1) Michael Daly (0-1) Shane Williams (0-1) Marcus Kennedy (0-1)	Report	Brendan Murtagh (0-10) Luke Loughlin (0-3) Matthew Glynn (0-1) Jordan Smith (0-1)	Referee: Alfie Devine

July 1 Round 1	Raharney	1-15 - 2-15	Castlepollard	TEG Cusack Park
	Eoin Keyes (1-2) Killian Doyle (0-4) Devin Hill (0-3) Ciaran Doyle (0-3) Eamon Cunneen (0-1), Cormac Boyle (0-1)	Report	Allan Devine (2-4) John McCarthy (0-3) Joe Rabbitte (0-2) Andrew Dermody (0-2) Paul Dermody (0-1) Colm Dermody (0-1) David Devine (0-1)	Referee: Caymon Flynn

July 2 Round 1	Castletown Geoghegan	1-23 - 4-11	Fr Daltons	TEG Cusack Park
	Niall O'Brien (0-9) Cormac Jackson (1-2) Shane Clavin (0-3) Peter Clarke (0-3) Peter Murphy (0-3) Morgan Gavigan (0-2) Aonghus Clarke (0-1)	Report	Owen McCabe (0-8) Brian Finnerty (2-0) Jack Kearney (1-1) Jack Duncan (1-0) John Gilligan (0-1) Enda Kincaid (0-1)	Referee: Barry Kelly

July 15 Round 2	Castletown Geoghegan	2-19 - 1-20	Clonkill	TEG Cusack Park
	Niall O'Brien (1-13) Jack Gallagher (1-0) Morgan Gavigan (0-1) Aonghus Clarke (0-1) Peter Clarke (0-1) Cormac Jackson (0-1) David O'Reilly (0-1) Conor Murphy (0-1)	Report	Brendan Murtagh (0-10) Peadar Scully (1-1) Oisín Loughlin (0-2) Luke Loughlin (0-2) Darragh Egerton (0-1) Jordan Smyth (0-1) Alan McGrath (0-1) Luke Kenny (0-1) Anthony Price (0-1)	Referee: Alfie Devine

July 16 Round 2	Fr Daltons	4-09 - 2-20	Raharney	TEG Cusack Park
	Owen McCabe (2-1) Brian Finnerty (0-5) Enda Kincaid (1-0) John Gilligan (1-0) Ivan Smyth (0-2) Jack Kearney (0-1)	Report	Killian Doyle (0-16) Ciaran Doyle (1-1) Devin Hill (1-0) Eamon Cunneen (0-1) Eoin Keyes (0-1) Joey Boyle (0-1)	Referee: Mick Murtagh

July 16 Round 2	Castlepollard	1-13 - 4-14	Lough Lene Gaels	TEG Cusack Park
	Allan Devine (0-9) Andrew Dermody (1-0) John McCarthy (0-2) David Devine (0-1) Conor Sheridan (0-1)	Report	Derek McNicholas (3-1) David Williams (0-9) Eoin Daly (1-1) Shane Williams (0-1) Micheal Daly (0-1) Noel Conaty (0-1)	Referee: Caymon Flynn

July 28 Round 3	Lough Lene Gaels	2-19 - 0-8	Fr Daltons	TEG Cusack Park
	Derek McNicholas (1-5) Shane Williams (1-3) David Williams (0-6) Marcus Kennedy (0-3) Jason Malone (0-2)	Report	Brian Finnerty (0-6) Ivan Smyth (0-1) Jack Duncan (0-1)	Referee: Barry Nea

July 29 Round 3	Clonkill	1-19 - 2-9	Castlepollard	TEG Cusack Park
	Brendan Murtagh (0-10) Paddy Dowdall (1-1) Luke Loughlin (0-3) Daire McLaughlin (0-2) Peadar Scally (0-1) Jordan Smyth (0-1) Mark Keegan (0-1)	Report	David Devine (2-0) Allan Devine (0-5) John McCarthy (0-3) Paul Dermody	Referee: Caymon Flynn

July 29 Round 3	Castletown Geoghegan	0-19 - 2-15	Raharney	TEG Cusack Park
	Niall O'Brien (0-15) Morgan Gavigan (0-1) Shane Clavin (0-1) Plunkett Maxwell (0-1) David O'Reilly (0-1)	Report	Killian Doyle (0-12) Eoin Keys (1-0) Brian McGrath (1-0) Eamonn Cuneen (0-2) Eoghan Ahern (0-1)	Referee: Mick Murtagh

August 19 Round 4	Castlepollard	1-12 - 1-24	Castletown Geoghegan	TEG Cusack Park
	Allan Devine (0-8) Andre Dermody (1-0) David Devine (0-2) Luke Roddy (0-1) John McCarthy (0-1)	Report	Niall O'Brien (0-10) David O'Reilly (0-5) Jack Gallagher (1-2) Connor Murphy (0-3) Peter Clarke (0-1) Shane Clavin (0-1) Johnny Bermingham (0-1) Neal Kirby (0-1)	Referee: Mick Murtagh

August 20 Round 4	Fr Daltons	1-5 - 8-17	Clonkill	TEG Cusack Park
	Sam Maxwell (1-0) Owen McCabe (0-2) John Gilligan (0-2) Enda Kincaid (0-1)	Report	Brendan Murtagh (3-6) Alan McGrath (2-2) Daire McLaughlin (1-2) Luke Loughlin (1-1) Darragh Egerton (0-3) Peadar Scally (1-1) Oisín Loughlin (0-2) Shane Power (0-1)	Referee: James McGrath

August 20 Round 4	Raharney	2-21 - 2-7	Lough Lene Gaels	TEG Cusack Park
	Killian Doyle (0-10) Eoghan Ahearn (2-1) Eamonn Cunneen (0-2) Ciaran Doyle (0-2) Joey Boyle (0-2) David Hickey (0-2) Cormac Boyle (0-1) Eoin Keyes (0-1)	Report	Micheál Daly (1-2) David Williams (0-5) Derek McNicholas (1-0)	Referee: Barry Kelly

September 10 Round 5	Clonkill	0-13 - 2-15	Raharney	TEG Cusack Park
	Jordy Smyth (0-4) Luke Loughlin (0-3) Brendan Murtagh (0-2) Shane Power (0-1) Peadar Scally (0-1)	Report	Killian Doyle (1-7) Joey Boyle (1-2) Cormac Boyle (0-1) David Hickey (0-1) Eamonn Cunneen (0-1) Eoin Keyes (0-1) Eoghan Ahearn (0-1) Brian McGrath (0-1)	Referee: Barry Kelly

September 10 Round 5	Lough Lene Gaels	3-14 - 2-19	Castletown Geoghegan	Lakepoint Park
	Jason Malone (2-0) David Williams (0-6) Thomas Kennedy (1-0) Michael Daly (0-3) Eoin Daly (0-3) Darragh Qamar (0-1) Shane Williams (0-1)	Report	Niall O'Brien (0-10) David O'Reilly (1-2) Peter Clarke (1-0) Shane CLavin (0-2) Connor Murphy (0-2) Jack Gallagher (0-2) Cormac Jackson (0-1)	Referee: Cayman Flynn

September 11 Round 5	Castlepollard	3-7 - 0-10	Fr Daltons	Kinnegad
	Allan Devine (1-3) Derek Murray (1-1) Andrew Dermody (1-0) John McCarthy (0-3)	Report	Brian Finery (0-5) Jack Kearney (0-1) Sean Kenna (0-1) Colm O'Rourke (0-1) Ronan McLoughlin (0-1) Owen McCabe (0-1)	Referee: James McGrath

=== Knockout stage ===
Semifinals
2	Castletown Geoghegan	1-15
3	Lough Lene Gaels	1-16

Final
1	Raharney	2-19
3	Lough Lene Gaels	2-17

==== Fixtures ====
September 24 Semi-Final	Castletown Geoghegan	1-15 - 1-16	Lough Lene Gaels	TEG Cusack Park
	Niall O'Brien (1-9) David O'Reilly (0-3) Peter Clarke (0-2) Cormac Jackson (0-1)	Report	David Williams (0-11) Derek McNicholas (1-1) Michael Daly (0-1) Brendan Boyle (0-1) Tommy Boyle (0-1) Eoin Daly (0-1)	Referee: Alfie Devine

October 8 Final	Raharney	2-19 - 2-17	Lough Lene Gaels	TEG Cusack Park
	Killian Doyle (1-11) Eoin Keyes (0-3) Brian McGrath (1-0) Joey Boyle (0-2) Robbie Greville (0-1) Eamon Cuneen (0-1) Ciaran Doyle (0-1)	Report	David Williams (1-5) Tommy Doyle (0-4) Eoin Daly (0-4) Derek McNicholas (1-1) Shane Williams (0-1) Micheál Daly (0-1) Aaron Kennedy (0-1)

=== Top scorers ===
Overall

Rank	Player	Club	Tally	Total	Games	Average
1	Niall O'Brien	Castletown Geoghegan	2-66	72	6	12.00
2	Killian Doyle	Raharney	2-60	66	6	11
3	David Williams	Lough Lene Gaels	1-52	55	7	7.86
4	Brendan Murtagh	Clonkill	3-38	47	5	9.40
5	Allan Devine	Castlepollard	3-29	38	5	7.60
