= 2024 Westmeath Senior Hurling Championship =

Annual hurling competition

- Dates: July 12 - Nov 2, 2024
- Teams: 6
- Sponsor: Slevin's Coaches
- Champions: Castletown Geoghegan (15th title); Aonghus Clarke (captain); Alan Mangan (manager)
- Runners-up: Lough Lene Gaels; Tommy Doyle (captain); Joey Williams (manager)
- Relegated: St Oliver Plunkett's GAA

Tournament statistics
- Matches played: 17
- Goals scored: 62 (3.65 per match)
- Points scored: 781 (45.94 per match)
- Top scorer(s): David Williams (1-55)

The 2024 Westmeath Senior Hurling Championship was the 120th staging of the Westmeath Senior Hurling Championship.

A total of six teams contested the Westmeath Senior Hurling Championship. All six teams enter the round-robin stage, playing each other once, guaranteeing at least five championship games. The first round draws of games were streamed live via YouTube on April 4, while the full schedule was released via Twitter on June 17.

St Oliver Plunkett's GAA were promoted to the championship as last year's Senior 'B' champions replacing relegated Fr Daltons from last year.

Raharney entered the championship as defending champions, but were eliminated at the group stage.

The final was initially to be played October 27, at TEG Cusack Park in Mullingar between Castletown Geoghegan and Lough Lene Gaels, but was abandoned after 13 minutes due to unplayable conditions. The replayed match took place on November 2, with Castletown Geoghegan winning 1-27 - 2-17 to lift their 15th county title.

== Results ==
=== Group stage ===
Advance to final Advance to semi-finals Relegated to Senior 'B'

Team	Matches				Score			Pts
Team	Pld	W	D	L	For	Against	Diff	Pts
Castletown Geoghegan	5	4	0	1	142	101	41	8
Lough Lene Gaels	5	4	0	1	127	109	18	8
Clonkill	5	3	0	2	128	118	10	6
Raharney	5	3	0	2	135	98	37	6
Castlepollard	5	1	0	4	85	128	-43	2
St Oliver Plunkett's	5	0	0	5	87	150	-63	0

==== Fixtures ====
Jul 12 Round 1	Castletown Geoghegan	2-17 - 1-22	Raharney	TEG Cusack Park
	David O'Reilly (1-3), Liam Varley (0-6), Jack Gallagher (1-2), Plunkett Maxwell (0-2), Johnny Bermingham (0-1) Peter Clarke (0-1), Aonghus Clarke (0-1), Peter Murphy (0-1)	Report	Killian Doyle (0-13), Eamonn Cunneen (0-4), Devan Hill (1-0), Cormac Boyle (0-1), Michael Doherty (0-1), Eoghan Ahearn (0-1)	Referee: Barry Kelly

Jul 13 Round 1	St Oliver Plunkett's	0-17 - 3-19	Lough Lene Gaels	TEG Cusack Park
	Paddy Lynam (0-4), Ross Corroon (0-2), Ciaran Curley (0-2), Matthew Cunningham (0-2), Davy Gavin (0-2), Shane Ormsby (0-2), Aaron Craig (0-1), Darragh Hughes (0-1)	Report	Marcus Kennedy (3-3), David Williams (0-6), Micheál Daly (0-3), Tommy Doyle (0-3), Aaron Kennedy (0-2), Derek McNicholas (0-1), Brendan Doyle (0-1)	Referee: James McGrath

Jul 14 Round 1	Castlepollard	0-16 - 2-18	Clonkill	TEG Cusack Park
	John McCarthy (0-9), Darragh McCormack (0-4), Charlie McCormack (0-4), Andrew Dermody (0-1), Allan Devine (0-1)	Report	Luke Loughlin (1-5), Jordan Smyth (1-1), Andrew Shaw (0-4), Darragh Egerton (0-3), Robbie Cleary (0-2), Jamie Coffey (0-1), Brian Gaffney (0-1), Matthew Glynn (0-1)	Referee: Caymon Flynn

Aug 2 Round 2	Lough Lene Gaels	2-16 - 1-10	Castlepollard	TEG Cusack Park
	Tommy Doyle (2-2), David Williams (0-7), Derek McNicholas (0-3), Shane Williams (0-2), Brendan Boyle (0-1), John Egan (0-1)	Report	John McCarthy (0-5), Allen Devine (1-0), Darragh McCormack (0-2), Andrew Dermody (0-2), Darragh Tierney (0-1)	Referee: Caymon Flynn

Aug 3 Round 2	Raharney	3-25 - 0-5	St Oliver Plunkett's	TEG Cusack Park
	Killian Doyle (0-10), Ciaran Doyle (2-1), Eamonn Cunneen (1-2), Cillian Doyle (0-4), Darren Finn (0-2), David Hickey (0-2), Robbie Greville (0-1), Eoin Keyes (0-1), Brian McGrath (0-1), Brian McHugh (0-1)	Report	Paddy Lynam (0-3), Davy Gavin (0-1), Thomas Meehan (0-1)	Referee: James McGrath

Aug 4 Round 2	Clonkill	3-11 - 0-27	Castletown Geoghegan	TEG Cusack Park
	Oisín Loughlin (0-7), Oisin Murray (1-2), Peadar Scally (1-2), Luke Loughlin (1-0)	Report	David O'Reilly (0-6), Liam Varley (0-6), Niall O'Brien (0-5), Peter Clarke (0-2), Aonghus Clarke (0-2), Jack Gallagher (0-2), Shane Clavin (0-1), Morgan Gavigan (0-1), Jack Murphy 0-1, Conor Murphy (0-1)	Referee: Barry Kelly

Aug 17 Round 3	Castlepollard	2-21 - 4-12	St Oliver Plunkett's	TEG Cusack Park
	John McCarthy (0-11), Darragh McCormack (1-3), Brian Gilchrist (0-5), Eoin English (1-0), Allan Devine (0-1), Darragh Tierney (0-1)	Report	Conor Lynch (2-2), Ciaran Curley (2-0), Paddy Lynam (0-4), Matthew Cunningham (0-2), David Gavin (0-2), Nathan Cornally (0-1), Shane Ormsby (0-1)	Referee: Barry Nea

Aug 18 Round 3	Clonkill	4-16 - 1-23	Raharney	TEG Cusack Park
	Oisín Murray (3-1), Peadar Scally (0-9), Luke Loughlin (1-1), Oisín Loughlin (0-2), Jordy Smyth (0-2), Andrew Shaw (0-1)	Report	Killian Doyle (0-12), Eoin Keyes (1-2), Eamonn Cunneen (0-3), Ciaran Doyle (0-2), Eoghan Ahearn (0-1), Michael Doherty (0-1), Rory Keyes (0-1), Brian McGrath (0-1)	Referee: Caymon Flynn

Aug 18 Round 3	Lough Lene Gaels	2-10 - 1-18	Castletown Geoghegan	TEG Cusack Park
	David Williams (1-6), Brendan Boyle (1-0), Aaron Kennedy (0-2), Micheál Daly (0-1), Marcus Kennedy (0-1)	Report	Niall O'Brien (0-8), Jack Gallagher (1-1), Liam Varley (0-3), Aonghus Clarke (0-2), Peter Clarke (0-2), Johnny Bermingham (0-1), Cormac Jackson (0-1)	Referee: James McGrath

Aug 31 Round 4	St Oliver Plunkett's	0-17 - 2-20	Clonkill	TEG Cusack Park
	Paddy Lynam (0-6), Conor Lynch (0-6), Matthew Cunningham (0-3), Ciaran Curley (0-1), Davy Gavy (0-1)		Oisín Loughlin (0-8), Luke Loughlin (1-2), Andrew Shaw (1-2), Peadar Scally (0-5), Jordy Smyth (0-2), Paul Poynton (0-1)	Referee: Caymon Flynn

Sep 1 Round 4	Castlepollard	0-16 - 3-27	Castletown Geoghegan	TEG Cusack Park
	John McCarthy (0-8), Darragh McCormack (0-5), Colm Dermody (0-1), Brian Gilchrist (0-1), Darragh Tierney (0-1)	Report	Niall O'Brien (2-12), Jack Gallagher (1-3), Liam Varley (0-4), Aonghus Clarke (0-3), Cormac Jackson (0-3), Conor Murphy (0-2)	Referee: Barry Nea

Sep 1 Round 4	Raharney	3-19 - 4-17	Lough Lene Gaels	TEG Cusack Park
	Killian Doyle (0-10), Eoin Keyes (1-2), Robert Coyne (1-0), Ciaran Doyle (1-0), Eamonn Cunneen (0-3), Michael Doherty (0-2), Darren Finn (0-1), Rory Keyes (0-1)	Report	David Williams (1-10), Shane Williams (1-1), Micheál Daly (1-0), Warren Williams (1-0), Marcus Kennedy 0-3), Derek McNicholas (0-2), Tommy Doyle (0-1)	Referee: Barry Kelly

Sep 22 Round 5	Lough Lene Gaels	4-20 - 3-21	Clonkill	TEG Cusack Park
	David Williams (1-10), Eoin Daly (1-3), Tommy Doyle (1-1), Marcus Kennedy, (1-1), Brendan Doyle (0-1), Jordan Williams (0-1)		Luke Loughlin (1-4), Peader Scally (0-7), Jordy Symth (1-0), Oisin Murray (1-0), Robbie Cleary (0-3), Andrew Shaw (0-2), Oisin Loughlin (0-1), Niall Mitchell (0-1), Josh Murtagh (0-1)	Referee: Alfie Devine

Sep 22 Round 5	St Oliver Plunkett's	3-15 - 3-26	Castletown Geoghegan	The Downs
	David Gavin (1-3), Paddy Lynam (0-6), Thomas Meehan (1-0), Shane Ormsby (1-0), Matthew Cunningham (0-2), Cian Lynch (0-2), Liam Carey (0-1), Aaron Craig (0-1)	Report	Niall O'Brien (0-11), David O'Reilly (1-3), Aonghus Clarke (1-2), Jack Gallagher (1-2)	Referee: Barry Nea

Sep 22 Round 5	Castlepollard	1-10 - 1-19	Raharney	Rochfortbridge
	John McCarthy (1-6), Darragh McCormack (0-3), Ciarán English (0-1)	Report	Eoin Keyes (1-4), Killian Doyle (0-6), Joey Boyle (0-2), Gary Greville (0-1), Eamonn Cunneen (0-1), Micheal Doherty (0-1), Robbie Coyne (0-1), Ciarán Doyle (0-1), Devin Hill (0-1), Rory Keyes (0-1)	Referee: Sean Carroll

=== Knockout stage ===
Semifinals
2	Lough Lene Gaels	1-15
3	Clonkill	0-16

Final
1	Castletown Geoghegan	1-27
2	Lough Lene Gaels	2-17

==== Fixtures ====
Oct 6 Semi-Final	Lough Lene Gaels	1-15 - 0-16	Clonkill	TEG Cusack Park
	David Williams (0-9), Marcus Kennedy (1-0), Derek McNicholas (0-2), Eoin Daly (0-2), Micheál Daly (0-1), Tommy Doyle (0-1)	Report	Peadar Scally (0-9), Luke Loughlin (0-3), Andrew Shaw (0-1), Jordy Symth (0-1), Matthew Glynn (0-1)	Referee: Caymon Flynn

Oct 27 Final	Castletown Geoghegan	'ABND'	Lough Lene Gaels	TEG Cusack Park
				Referee: Barry Kelly

Nov 2 Final	Castletown Geoghegan	1-27 - 2-17	Lough Lene Gaels	TEG Cusack Park
	Niall O'Brien (0-10), David O'Reilly (1-5), Connor Murphy (0-3), Liam Varley (0-3), Jack Gallagher (0-2), Peter Murphy (0-2), Aonghus Clarke (0-1), Peter Clarke (0-1)	Report	David Williams (0-7) Aaron Kennedy (1-0), Jason Malone (1-0), Eoin Daly (0-3), Tommy Doyle (0-3), Shane Williams (0-2), Marcus Kennedy (0-1), Derek McNicholas (0-1)	Referee: Barry Kelly

=== Top scorers ===
Overall

Rank	Player	Club	Tally	Total	Games	Average
1	David Williams	Lough Lene Gaels	1-55	58	7	8.28
2	Niall O'Brien	Castletown Geoghegan	2-46	52	6	8.667
3	Killian Doyle	Raharney	0-51	51	5	10.2
4	John McCarthy	Castlepollard	1-39	42	5	8.4
