= 2019 Westmeath Senior Hurling Championship =

Annual hurling competition season

- Dates: 20 July - 20 October 2019
- Teams: 10
- Sponsor: Slevin's Coaches
- Champions: Clonkill (16th title)
- Runners-up: Castletown Geoghegan
- Relegated: St Brigid's

Tournament statistics
- Matches played: 25
- Goals scored: 62 (2.48 per match)
- Points scored: 1'010 (40.4 per match)

The 2019 Westmeath Senior Hurling Championship was the 115th of the Westmeath Senior Hurling Championship since its establishment by the Westmeath County Board in 1903.

Ten teams contest the Westmeath Senior Hurling Championship. Clonkill entered the championship as the defending champions, defeating Raharney.

The final was played at Cusack Park in Mullingar, between Clonkill and Castletown Geoghegan. Clonkill won the match by 2–16 to 1–16 to claim their 16th championship title overall with back-to-back championships.

== Group 1 table ==
Semi-Finalists Quarter-Finalists

Team	Matches				Score			Pts
Team	Pld	W	D	L	For	Against	Diff	Pts
Raharney	4	4	0	0	87	60	17	8
Lough Lene Gaels	4	2	0	2	77	73	4	4
Castletown Geoghegan	4	2	0	2	93	75	18	4
Clonkill	4	1	0	3	85	97	-12	2
Castlepollard	4	1	0	3	60	97	-37	2

=== Fixtures ===
Jul 19 Round 1	Raharney	0-15 - 0-9	Lough Lene Gaels	TEG Cusack Park
				Referee: Barry Nea

Jul 20 Round 1	Clonkill	1-18 - 1-21	Castletown Geoghegan	TEG Cusack Park
				Referee: Barry Kelly

Jul 27 Round 2	Castletown Geoghegan	3-23 - 0-9	Castlepollard	TEG Cusack Park
				Referee: Matt Shaw

Jul 28 Round 2	Clonkill	1-11 - 4-18	Raharney	TEG Cusack Park
				Referee: Barry Kelly

Aug 6 Round 3	Raharney	2-12 - 1-13	Castlepollard	TEG Cusack Park
				Referee: Mick Murtagh

Aug 7 Round 3	Lough Lene Gaels	4-16 - 2-16	Clonkill	TEG Cusack Park
				Referee: JP Reynolds

Aug 25 Round 4	Lough Lene Gaels	0-21 - 0-16	Castletown Geoghegan	TEG Cusack Park
				Referee: Caymon Flynn

Aug 25 Round 4	Castlepollard	0-15 - 3-19	Clonkill	TEG Cusack Park
				Referee: Barry Kelly

Sep 1 Round 5	Castletown Geoghegan	0-21 - 1-21	Raharney	TEG Cusack Park
				Referee: Matt Shaw

Sep 1 Round 5	Castlepollard	0-20 - 1-16	Lough Lene Gaels	TEG Cusack Park
				Referee: Caymon Flynn

== Group 2 table ==
Quarter-Finalists Relegation to Intermediate

Team	Matches				Score			Pts
Team	Pld	W	D	L	For	Against	Diff	Pts
Delvin	4	4	0	0	92	55	37	8
Crookedwood	4	3	0	1	69	78	-9	4
Brownstown	4	2	0	2	89	86	3	4
Fr. Daltons	4	1	0	3	82	95	-13	2
St Brigid's	4	0	0	4	72	90	-18	0

=== Fixtures ===
Jul 20 Round 1	Fr. Daltons	2-18 - 2-19	Brownstown	TEG Cusack Park
				Referee: Mick Murtagh

Jul 21 Round 1	Delvin	2-17 - 0-7	Crookedwood	TEG Cusack Park
				Referee: Mick Murtagh

Jul 27 Round 2	Delvin	3-19 - 1-14	Fr. Daltons	TEG Cusack Park
				Referee: John Dermody

Jul 28 Round 2	Crookedwood	2-15 - 0-17	St Brigid's	TEG Cusack Park
				Referee: Mick Murtagh

Aug 6 Round 3	Brownstown	0-17 - 1-19	Delvin	TEG Cusack Park
				Referee: Barry Nea

Aug 7 Round 3	Fr. Daltons	2-16 - 2-15	St Brigid's	TEG Cusack Park
				Referee: Alfie Devine

Aug 24 Round 4	St Brigid's	0-14 - 0-19	Delvin	TEG Cusack Park
				Referee: JP Reynolds

Aug 24 Round 4	Brownstown	1-16 - 1-17	Crookedwood	TEG Cusack Park
				Referee: John Dermody

Aug 31 Round 5	Crookedwood	1-18 - 0-19	Fr. Daltons	TEG Cusack Park
				Referee: Alfie Devine

Aug 31 Round 5	St Brigid's	0-20 - 2-22	Brownstown	TEG Cusack Park
				Referee: James McGrath

=== Knockout stage ===
==== Quarter-Finals ====
Sep 15 2019 Quarter-final	Clonkill	4-25 - 0-6	Crookedwood	TEG Cusack Park
				Referee: Barry Kelly

Sep 15 2019 Quarter-final	Castletown Geoghegan	4-20 - 1-11	Delvin	TEG Cusack Park
				Referee: Matt Shaw

==== Semi-Finals ====
Sep 29 2019 Semi-final	Castletown Geoghegan	2-22 - 1-10	Lough Lene Gaels	TEG Cusack Park
				Referee: Mick Murtagh

Sep 29 2019 Semi-final	Clonkill	1-15 - 0-15	Raharney	TEG Cusack Park
				Referee: James McGrath

==== Final ====
Oct 20 2019 Final	Clonkill	2-16 - 1-16	Castletown Geoghegan	Cusack Park
	Brendan Murtagh (0-6), Jordan Smyth (1-2), Peader Scally (1-0), Luke Loughlin (0-2), Christopher Austin (0-1), Niall Dowdall (0-1), Paddy Dowdall (0-1), Luke Folan (0-1), Anthony Price (0-1), Niall Mitchell (0-1)	Report	Aonghus Clarke (0-9), Ciaran O’Brien (1-0), Joe Clarke (0-3), Andrew Corbett (0-1), David Lynch (0-1), Plunkett Maxwell (0-1), Liam Varley (0-1),	Referee: Alfie Devine
