= 2014 Westmeath Senior Hurling Championship =

Annual hurling competition season

The 2014 Westmeath Senior Hurling Championship was the 110th staging of the Westmeath Senior Hurling Championship since its establishment by the Westmeath County Board in 1889. The championship began on 19 July 2014.

Castletown Geoghegan were the defending champions, however, they were defeated in the semi-final stages. Raharney GAA won the title after defeating Castlepollard (2-12 to 1-9) in the final.

== Fixtures and results ==
=== Group stage ===
| Pos | Team | Pld | W | D | L | For | Ag. | Diff. | Pts. |
|---|---|---|---|---|---|---|---|---|---|
| 1 | Raharney | 7 | 6 | 0 | 1 | 149 | 83 | 56 | 12 |
| 2 | Castletown Geoghegan | 7 | 6 | 0 | 1 | 155 | 104 | 51 | 12 |
| 3 | Clonkill | 7 | 5 | 0 | 2 | 176 | 105 | 71 | 10 |
| 4 | Castlepollard | 7 | 4 | 0 | 3 | 114 | 113 | 1 | 8 |
| 5 | St. Oliver Plunkett's | 7 | 3 | 0 | 4 | 96 | 97 | -1 | 6 |
| 6 | Lough Lene Gaels | 7 | 3 | 0 | 4 | 99 | 111 | -12 | 6 |
| 7 | Delvin | 7 | 0 | 1 | 6 | 101 | 157 | -56 | 1 |
| 8 | Crookedwood | 7 | 0 | 1 | 6 | 75 | 195 | -120 | 1 |

=== Semi-finals ===
| 4 October 2014 Semi-final | Castlepollard | 2-11 - 0-16 | Castletown Geoghegan | Cusack Park |

| 4 October 2014 Semi-final | Clonkill | 2-8 - 1-16 | Raharney | Cusack Park |

=== Final ===
| 19 October 2014 Final | Castlepollard | 1-9 - 2-12 | Raharney | Cusack Park |
