= 2026–27 All-Ireland Senior Club Hurling Championship =

2026–27 season of the premier club hurling competition

All-Ireland Senior Club Hurling Championship 2026–27
Championship Details
- Dates: 1 November 2026 – 17 January 2027
- Teams: 18

All Ireland Champions

Provincial Champions
- Munster: Not Played
- Leinster: Not Played
- Ulster: Not Played
- Connacht: Not Played

Championship Statistics
- Matches Played: 10
- Total Goals: 24
- Total Points: 382
- Top Scorer: Aidan McCarthy (0–25)

The 2026–27 All-Ireland Senior Club Hurling Championship is the 56th staging of the All-Ireland Senior Club Hurling Championship, the Gaelic Athletic Association's premier inter-county club hurling tournament. The competition is scheduled to run from 1 November 2026 to 17 January 2027.

Ballygunner are the defending champions. The Harps and Inagh–Kilnamona made their championship debuts.

== Team summaries ==
Team	County	Captain(s)	Manager	Most recent success		
Team	County	Captain(s)	Manager	All-Ireland	Provincial	County
Ballygunner	Waterford	Mikey Mahony; Peter Hogan	Jason Ryan	2026	2025	2025
Ballyhale Shamrocks	Kilkenny	Joey Holden	Mark Aylward	2023	2022	2025
Glen Rovers	Cork	Adam Lynch	Tomás Mulcahy	1977	1976	2016
Kilmacud Crokes	Dublin	Oisín O'Rorke	Paddy Lenihan			2022
Inagh–Kilnamona	Clare	Aidan McCarthy	Eugene Cullinan			
Kilcormac–Killoughey	Offaly	Charlie Mitchell	Declan Laffan		2012	2025
Kilmallock	Limerick	Graeme Mulcahy	James Hickey		2014	2021
Loughrea	Galway	Ian Hanrahan	Tommy Kelly			2025
Lough Lene Gaels	Westmeath	David Williams	Joey Williams			2002
Mount Leinster Rangers	Carlow	Richard Coady	Niall Bergin		2013	2025
Naas	Kildare	Conan Boran	Mark Dowling			2025
Portaferry	Down	Matthew Conlan	Connor O'Prey		2014	2025
Shelmaliers	Wexford	Conor Hearne	Richie Power			2020
Slaughtneil	Derry	Conor McAllister	Paul McCormack		2025	2025
The Harps	Laois	Pádraic Dunne	Ken Hogan			
Thurles Sarsfields	Tipperary	Conor Stakelum	Pádraic Maher		2012	2017

== Leinster Senior Club Hurling Championship ==
=== Leinster quarter-finals ===
8 November 2026 Quarter-final	Lough Lene Gaels (Westmeath)	4-14 - 2-21	Shelmaliers (Wexford)	TEG Cusack Park
	D McNicholas 2-2, D Williams 0-5 (4fs), M Kennedy 1-2, R Williams 1-0, A Kennedy, S Williams 0-2 each, J Malone 0-1.	Report	R Banville 0-9 (5fs, 1‘65’), C Doyle 1-3 (0-1s/l), P Connors 1-1, C Hearne 0-3, S Donohoe, A Kinsella, J Roche, P Hearne, S Keane Carroll 0-1 each.

8 November 2026 Quarter-final	Naas (Kildare)	3-25 - 1-32 (aet)	Kilcormac–Killoughey (Offaly)	Cedral St Conleth's Park
	J Sheridan 1-13 (0-10f, 0-1 65), B Byrne 1-3, J Burke 0-4, C Dowling 1-0, D Guerin 0-2, S Leacy 0-1, C Boran 0-1, O O'Neill 0-1.	Report	A Screeney 1-13 (0-11f), C Slevin 0-5 (0-5f), C Spain 0-4, C Mahon 0-3, T Geraghty 0-2, P Geraghty 0-1, E Grogan 0-1, D Hand 0-1, C Kiely 0-1, K Guinan 0-1.

8 November 2026 Quarter-final	The Harps (Laois)	1-16 - 3-19	Ballyhale Shamrocks (Kilkenny)	Laois Hire O'Moore Park
	C Comerford 0-6 (5f), M Downey 1-0, R Deegan 0-3, E Murphy (1 65) and J Duggan 0-2 each, E Delaney, J Duggan and J Brophy 0-1 each.	Report	TJ Reid 1-8 (1-0 pen, 6f), B Cody 1-3, D Corcoran 1-0, E Cody, R Corcoran and N Shortall 0-2 each, K Corcoran and J Mullen 0-1 each.

8 November 2026 Quarter-final	Mount Leinster Rangers (Carlow)	1-16 - 0-22	Kilmacud Crokes (Dublin)	Netwatch Cullen Park
	C Nolan 1-9 (1-0 pen, 7fs), D Murphy 0-2, R Murphy 0-2 (1f) each, F Fitzpatrick, E Byrne, K McDonald 0-1 each.	Report	R Hayes 0-9 (8fs), B Hayes 0-3, D Purcell, A Considine 0-2 each, F Donohoe, C O’Riain, O O’Rorke, S Purcell, B Kenny, C Conway 0-1 each

=== Leinster semi-finals ===
22 November 2026 Semi-final	Ballyhale Shamrocks (Kilkenny)	1-18 - 0-13	Kilmacud Crokes (Dublin)	UPMC Nowlan Park
	TJ Reid 0-8 (0-6f), A Mullen 1-1, E Cody 0-3, R Reid 0-2, R Corcoran 0-2, M Barron 0-1, N Shortall 0-1	Report	R Hayes 0-6 (0-5f, 0-1 65), D Purcell 0-2, B Kenny 0-1, M Grogan 0-1, B Hayes 0-1, F Donohoe 0-1, A Considine 0-1	Referee: Matthew Farrell

22 November 2026 Semi-final	Shelmaliers (Wexford)	1-19 - 0-17	Kilcormac–Killoughey (Offaly)	Glenisk O'Connor Park
	R Banville 1-6 (1-0 pen, 4fs, 2 65s), S Donohoe 0-3, C Hearne 0-3, J Roche 0-3, C Doyle 0-2 (0-1f), P Hearne 0-1, E Nolan 0-1.	Report	A Screeney 0-5 (4fs), D Hand 0-4, C Mahon 0-2, T Geraghty 0-2, T Guinan 0-1, C Kiely 0-1, L Kavanagh 0-1, P Geraghty 0-1	Referee: Sean Stack

=== Leinster final ===
5 December 2026 Final	Ballyhale Shamrocks (Kilkenny)	v	Shelmaliers (Wexford)	Croke Park

== Munster Senior Club Hurling Championship ==
The draw for the Munster Club Championship took place on 31 July 2026.

=== Munster quarter-final ===
1 November 2026 Quarter-final	Glen Rovers (Cork)	1-14 - 1-21	Inagh–Kilnamona (Clare)	Páirc Uí Rinn
	P Horgan (1-8, 1-6 frees, 1 65); L Quilligan (0-2); R Downey, L Quilligan, MT Brosnan, E O’Leary, E Downey (0-1 each).	Report	A McCarthy (0-14, 9 frees, 1 65); D Fitzgerald (1-1); F Hegarty (0-2); C Hegarty, D Mescall, S Rynne, M Callinan (0-1 each).	Referee: A Tierney (Tipperary)

=== Munster semi-finals ===
15 November 2026 Sem-final	Inagh–Kilnamona (Clare)	0-22 – 0-23 (a.e.t.)	Thurles Sarsfields (Tipperary)	Zimmer Biomet Páirc Chíosóg
	A McCarthy 0-11 (7f); S Rynne, C Hegarty 0-3 each; É Foudy (2f), D Fitzgerald 0-2 each; J Guyler 0-1.	Report	A McCormack 0-10 (3f); K Rossiter 0-4; R Stapleton 0-3; A Stakelum 0-2; K Loughnane, D Rossiter, E Murray, T Maher 0-1 each.	Referee: T Walsh (Waterford)

15 November 2026 Semi-final	Ballygunner (Waterford)	1-20 – 1-11	Kilmallock (Limerick)	Azzurri Walsh Park
	Pauric Mahony 0-7 (5fs), D Hutchinson 1-4, M Mahony 0-3, P Hogan 0-2, H Ruddle, P Fitzgerald, S O’Keeffe, M Hartley 0-1 each.	Report	P Connery 0-7 (6fs), O O’Reilly 1-2, C Hanley-Clarke 0-1 (1f), S O’Brien 0-1.	Referee: N Malone (Clare)

=== Munster final ===
29 November 2026 Final	Thurles Sarsfields (Tipperary)	v	Ballygunner (Waterford)

== Ulster Senior Club Hurling Championship ==
The draw for the Ulster Club Championship took place in August 2026.

=== Ulster semi-finals ===
15 November 2026 Semi-final	Portaferry (Down)	1-25 - 2-14	Dunloy (Antrim)	Box-It Athletic Grounds
	T McGrattan 1-7 (5F), F Turpin 0-6, D Sands 0-3, C Coleman 0-2, T Murray 0-2, E Sands 0-2, C Smyth 0-1, R Blair 0-1, N Fitzsimmons 0-1	Report	C Cunning 1-9 (9F), K Molloy 1-0, C McMahon 0-2, E O’Neill 0-2, S Elliot 0-1	Referee: T Conway

=== Ulster final ===
28 November 2026 Final	Slaughtneil (Derry)	v	Portaferry (Down)	Box-It Athletic Grounds

== All-Ireland Senior Club Hurling Championship ==
=== All-Ireland semi-finals ===
19/20 December 2026 Semi-final	Ulster representatives (Ulster)	v	Leinster representatives (Leinster)

19/20 December 2026 Semi-final	Loughrea (Galway)	v	Munster representatives (Munster)

=== All-Ireland final ===
17 January 2027 Final	v

== Championship statistics ==
=== Top scorers ===
Overall

Rank	Player	Club	Tally	Total	Matches	Average
1	Aidan McCarthy	Inagh–Kilnamona	0-25	25	2	12.50
2	Adam Screeney	Kilcormac–Killoughey	1-18	21	2	10.50
3	T. J. Reid	Ballyhale Shamrocks	1-16	19	2	9.50
4	Ross Banville	Shelmaliers	1-15	18	2	9.00
5	Jack Sheridan	Naas	1-13	16	1	16.00
6	Ronan Hayes	Kilmacud Crokes	0-15	15	2	7.50
7	Conal Cunning	Dunloy	1-09	12	1	12.00
7	Chris Nolan	Mount Leinster Rangers	1-09	12	1	12.00
9	Patrick Horgan	Glen Rovers	1-08	11	1	11.00
10	Tom McGrattan	Portaferry	1-07	10	1	10.00
10	Aidan McCormack	Thurles Sarsfields	0-10	10	1	10.00

In a single game

Rank	Player	Club	Tally	Total	Opposition
1	Adam Screeney	Kilcormac–Killoughey	1-13	16	Naas
1	Jack Sheridan	Naas	1-13	16	Kilcormac–Killoughey
3	Aidan McCarthy	Inagh–Kilnamona	0-14	14	Glen Rovers
4	Conal Cunning	Dunloy	1-09	12	Portaferry
4	Chris Nolan	Mount Leinster Rangers	1-09	12	Kilmacud Crokes
6	Patrick Horgan	Glen Rovers	1-08	11	Inagh–Kilnamona
6	T. J. Reid	Ballyhale Shamrocks	1-08	11	The Harps
6	Aidan McCarthy	Inagh–Kilnamona	0-11	11	Thurles Sarsfields
9	Tom McGrattan	Portaferry	1-07	10	Dunloy
9	Aidan McCormack	Thurles Sarsfields	0-10	10	Inagh–Kilnamona
