= 2022 Westmeath Senior Hurling Championship =

Annual hurling competition season

- Dates: 23 July - 3 October 2022
- Teams: 6
- Sponsor: Slevin's Coaches
- Champions: Castletown Geoghegan (14th title); Niall O'Brien (captain); Alan Mangan (manager)
- Runners-up: Clonkill; Shane Power (captain); Pat O’Toole (manager)
- Relegated: Cullion

Tournament statistics
- Matches played: 17
- Goals scored: 41 (2.41 per match)

The 2022 Westmeath Senior Hurling Championship was the 118th staging of the Westmeath Senior Hurling Championship since its establishment by the Westmeath County Board in 1903. The championship began on 23 August 2021 and ended on 3 October 2021.

Cullion were promoted to the championship Senior 'B' Hurling champions, replacing relegated Crookedwood from the previous year. Cullion would subsequently be relegated, finishing bottom of the group stage without a win.

Raharney entered the championship as the defending champions , however, they were beaten by Castletown Geoghegan at the semi-final stage.

The final was played on 3 October 2022 at TEG Cusack Park in Mullingar, between Clonkill and Castletown Geoghegan, in what was third meeting in a final in four years. Castletown Geoghegan won the match by 0–22 to 1–14 to claim their 14th championship title overall and first since 2017, qualifying them for the 2022 Leinster Senior Club Hurling Championship.

== Results ==
=== Group stage ===
Advance to final Advance to semi-finals Relegated to Senior 'B'

| Team | Matches | | | | Score | | | Pts |
| Team | Pld | W | D | L | For | Against | Diff | Pts |
|---|---|---|---|---|---|---|---|---|
| Clonkill | 5 | 5 | 0 | 0 | 112 | 74 | 38 | 10 |
| Raharney | 5 | 3 | 0 | 2 | 125 | 96 | 29 | 6 |
| Castletown Geoghegan | 5 | 3 | 0 | 2 | 112 | 100 | 12 | 6 |
| Castlepollard | 5 | 2 | 0 | 3 | 103 | 122 | -19 | 4 |
| Lough Lene Gaels | 5 | 1 | 1 | 3 | 101 | 116 | -15 | 3 |
| Cullion | 5 | 0 | 1 | 4 | 91 | 136 | -45 | 1 |

==== Fixtures ====
| 23 July 2022 Round 1 | Castletown Geoghegan | 0-14 - 1-21 | Clonkill |

| 24 July 2022 Round 1 | Raharney | 3-22 - 0-13 | Castlepollard |

| 24 July 2022 Round 1 | Cullion | 2-17 - 1-20 | Lough Lene Gaels |

| 27 July 2022 Round 2 | Clonkill | 2-15 - 0-19 | Raharney |

| 27 July 2022 Round 2 | Lough Lene Gaels | 3-14 - 0-24 | Castletown Geoghegan |

| 27 July 2022 Round 2 | Castlepollard | 3-29 - 4-12 | Cullion |

| 5 August 2022 Round 3 | Clonkill | 1-15 - 1-9 | Castlepollard |

| 8 August 2022 Round 3 | Lough Lene Gaels | 1-16 - 1-15 | Raharney |

| 10 August 2022 Round 3 | Castletown Geoghegan | 2-15 - 1-9 | Cullion |

| 19 August 2022 Round 4 | Cullion | 0-13 - 2-18 | Clonkill |

| 21 August 2022 Round 4 | Castlepollard | 2-20 - 0-20 | Lough Lene Gaels |

| 21 August 2022 Round 4 | Raharney | 2-21 - 1-21 | Castletown Geoghegan |

| 4 September 2022 Round 5 | Cullion | 1-16 - 0-30 | Raharney |

| 4 September 2022 Round 5 | Castletown Geoghegan | 4-17 - 0-14 | Castlepollard |

| 4 September 2022 Round 5 | Lough Lene Gaels | 1-13 - 1-22 | Clonkill |

=== Knockout stage ===
Semifinals
24 October
2 | Raharney | 0-15
3 | Castletown Geoghegan | 1-19

Final
3 November
1 | Clonkill | 1-14
3 | Castletown Geoghegan | 0-22

==== Fixtures ====
| 24 October 2021 Semi-final | Raharney | 0-15 - 1-19 | Castletown Geoghegan | TEG Cusack Park |

| 7 November 2021 Final | Clonkill | 1-14 - 0-22 | Castletown Geoghegan | TEG Cusack Park |
