= 2009 Westmeath Senior Hurling Championship =

Annual hurling competition season

- Champions: Clonkill (11th title); Seán Loughlin (captain)
- Runners-up: Lough Lene Gaels; Killian Cosgrove (captain)

The 2009 Westmeath Senior Hurling Championship was the 105th staging of the Westmeath Senior Hurling Championship since its establishment by the Westmeath County Board in 1903.

Raharney were the defending champions.

The final was played on 4 October 2009 at Cusack Park in Mullingar, between Clonkill and Lough Lene Gaels, in what was their third meeting in the final overall. Clonkill won the match by 1–16 to 2–09 to claim their 11th championship title overall and a first title in two years.

== Results ==
=== Final ===
4 October 2009 Final	Clonkill	1-16 - 2-09	Lough Lene Gaels	Cusack Park
