= 1987 Westmeath Senior Hurling Championship =

Hurling competition

- Dates: Jul 1 - Oct 4, 1987
- Champions: Ringtown (9th title); Walter Burke (captain); Tom Donahue (manager)
- Runners-up: Brownstown; Eugene Dolan (captain); John Davis (manager)

Tournament statistics
- Top scorer: David Kilcoyne (4-41)

The 1987 Westmeath Senior Hurling Championship was the 84th staging of the Westmeath Senior Hurling Championship since its establishment by the Westmeath County Board in 1903.

Castletown Geoghegan entered the championship at the quarter-final stage as defending champions, but were eliminated in the semi-finals by Brownstown. Castlepollard, Clonkill, Cullion, Lough Lene Gaels, Ringtown, St Brigid's, Southern Gaels, and Turin rounded out the field.

The final was played on October 4 at Cusack Park in Mullingar between Ringtown and Brownstown, in their first match-ups against each other in a final since 1980, and a ninth appearance in eleven finals for Brownstown. Ringtown won the contest 1-10 to 1-9 to win the Westmeath Examiner Cup for the first time since 1980, and their ninth - and to date last - title overall.

== Results ==
=== Semi-Finals ===
9 Aug Semi-Final	Brownstown	2-10 - 0-6	Castletown Geoghegan	Cusack Park

16 Aug Semi-Final	Ringtown	0-11 - 0-11	Raharney	Cusack Park

30 Aug Replay	Ringtown	3-11 - 2-8	Raharney	Cusack Park

=== Final ===
4 Oct Final	Ringtown	1-10 - 1-9	Brownstown	Cusack Park
				Referee: Terry O'Dowd
