= List of Westmeath senior hurling team captains =

This article lists players who have captained the senior Westmeath county hurling team in the Christy Ring Cup, the Joe McDonagh Cup, the Leinster Senior Hurling Championship and the All-Ireland Senior Hurling Championship.

== List of captains ==
Year	Player	Club	National titles
2007	Darren McCormack	Castlepollard	Christy Ring Cup-winning captain
2008	Brendan Murtagh	Clonkill	
2009	Paul Greville	Raharney	
2010	Andrew Mitchell	Clonkill	Christy Ring Cup-winning captain
2011	Eoin Price	Clonkill	
2012	Paddy Dowdall	Clonkill	
2013	Eoin Price	Clonkill	
2014	Eoin Price	Clonkill	
2015	Aonghus Clarke	Castletown Geoghegan	
2016	Aonghus Clarke	Castletown Geoghegan	
2017	Aonghus Clarke	Castletown Geoghegan	
2018	Tommy Doyle	Lough Lene Gaels	
2019	Aonghus Clarke	Castletown Geoghegan	
2020	Eoin Price	Clonkill	
2021	Cormac Boyle	Raharney	Joe McDonagh Cup-winning captain
2022			
2023			
2024			
2025			
2026			
