= 1962 Westmeath Senior Hurling Championship =

- Dates: July 15 - August 26, 1962
- Teams: 8
- Champions: Pearses (1st title); Mattie Mullen (captain)
- Runners-up: Raharney

Tournament statistics
- Matches played: 7
- Goals scored: 57 (8.14 per match)
- Points scored: 263 (37.57 per match)

The 1962 Westmeath Senior Hurling Championship was the 58th staging of the Westmeath Senior Hurling Championship.

The format ran as a straight-knockout tournament, with each team afforded just one defeat before elimination from the championship.

Eight teams contested the 1962 championship: Brownstown, Castlepollard, Castletown Geoghegan, Clonkill, Cullion, Pearses, Raharney, and Rickardstown.

Castlepollard entered as the defending champions, defeating Clonkill-Delvin amalgamation side St. Patrick's, but were eliminated in the semi-final stage.

The final was played on August 26, at Cusack Park in Mullingar between Pearses and Raharney. Pearses were contesting their first ever Senior final, while Raharney bridged a 37-year gap since their last appearance in a losing effort in 1925.

Pearses won the match by 2-9 to 3-5 to claim their first and only title, before disbanding in 1969.

== Results ==
Quarter Final
Castletown Geoghegan	5-9
Rickardstown	5-3
Pearses	2-12
Clonkill	4-4
Raharney	3-5
Cullion	2-5
Castlepollard	14-9
Brownstown	1-1

Semi Final
Pearses	2-13
Castletown Geoghegan	4-6
Raharney	7-6
Castlepollard	3-5

Final
Pearses	2-9
Raharney	3-5

=== Fixtures ===
Jul 15 Quarter-Final	Castletown Geoghegan	5-9 - 5-3	Rickardstown	Cusack Park

Jul 22 Quarter-Final	Raharney	3-5 - 2-5	Cullion	Cusack Park

Jul 29 Quarter-Final	Pearses	2-12 - 4-4	Clonkill	Collinstown

Aug 5 Quarter-Final	Castlepollard	14-9 - 1-1	Brownstown	Collinstown

Aug 12 Semi-Final	Pearses	2-13 - 4-6	Castletown Geoghegan	Cusack Park

Aug 12 Semi-Final	Raharney	7-6 - 3-5	Castlepollard	Cusack Park

Aug 26 Final	Pearses	2-9 - 3-5	Raharney	Cusack Park
	J Carey (0-8), T Houlihan (1-1), F Newman (1-0)		B Shiels (1-1), P Collins (1-0), K McLoughlin (1-0), M Gartland (0-2), J Rooney (0-2)	Referee: T Mooney
