= 2021 Westmeath Senior Hurling Championship =

Annual hurling competition season

- Dates: 14 August - 7 November 2021
- Teams: 6
- Sponsor: Slevin's Coaches
- Champions: Raharney (14th title); Sean Quinn (captain)
- Runners-up: Castletown Geoghegan; Shane Clavin (captain)
- Relegated: Crookedwood

Tournament statistics
- Matches played: 17
- Goals scored: 52 (3.06 per match)
- Points scored: 599 (35.24 per match)

The 2021 Westmeath Senior Hurling Championship was the 117th staging of the Westmeath Senior Hurling Championship since its establishment by the Westmeath County Board in 1903. The championship began on 14 August 2021 and ended on 7 November 2021.

Clonkill entered the championship as the defending champions, however, they were beaten by Castletown Geoghegan at the semi-final stage.

The final was played on 7 November 2021 at TEG Cusack Park in Mullingar, between Raharney and Castletown Geoghegan, in what was their first meeting in a final in four years. Raharney won the match by 0–21 to 0–18 to claim their 14th championship title overall and a first title in five years.

== Results ==
=== Group stage ===
==== Group stage table ====
Advance to final Advance to semi-finals Relegated to Senior 'B'

Team	Matches				Score			Pts
Team	Pld	W	D	L	For	Against	Diff	Pts
Raharney	5	4	1	0	145	87	58	9
Castletown Geoghegan	5	3	1	1	143	94	49	7
Clonkill	5	3	0	2	123	89	34	6
Lough Lene Gaels	5	2	0	3	119	113	6	4
Castlepollard	5	2	0	3	99	103	-4	4
Crookedwood	5	0	0	5	54	197	-143	0

==== Fixtures ====
Aug 14 Round 1	Lough Lene Gaels	2-14 - 1-15	Castlepollard	TEG Cusack Park
				Referee: Barry Kelly

Aug 15 Round 1	Crookedwood	0-11 - 6-25	Clonkill	TEG Cusack Park
				Referee: Caymon Flynn

Aug 15 Round 1	Raharney	2-16 - 2-16	Castletown Geoghegan	TEG Cusack Park
				Referee: Matt Shaw

Aug 28 Round 2	Castletown Geoghegan	3-36 - 0-11	Crookedwood	TEG Cusack Park
				Referee: James McGrath

Aug 28 Round 2	Castlepollard	1-15 - 3-20	Raharney	TEG Cusack Park
				Referee: Mick Murtagh

Aug 29 Round 2	Clonkill	1-19 - 1-17	Lough Lene Gaels	TEG Cusack Park
				Referee: Barry Kelly

Sep 11 Round 3	Castletown Geoghegan	2-14 - 4-14	Clonkill	TEG Cusack Park
				Referee: James McGrath

Sep 12 Round 3	Castlepollard	2-27 - 0-11	Crookedwood	TEG Cusack Park
				Referee: Bernard Heaney

Sep 12 Round 3	Raharney	2-24 - 3-15	Lough Lene Gaels	TEG Cusack Park
				Referee: Caymon Flynn

Sep 25 Round 4	Crookedwood	0-6 - 5-29	Raharney	TEG Cusack Park
				Referee: Barry Kelly

Sep 25 Round 4	Lough Lene Gaels	0-23 - 1-25	Castletown Geoghegan	TEG Cusack Park
				Referee: Mick Murtagh

Sep 26 Round 4	Clonkill	0-15 - 2-12	Castlepollard	TEG Cusack Park
				Referee: Barry Kelly

Oct 9 Round 5	Castlepollard	0-12 - 1-25	Castletown Geoghegan	TEG Cusack Park
				Referee: Caymon Flynn

Oct 9 Round 5	Lough Lene Gaels	4-20 - 1-12	Crookedwood	The Downs GAA
				Referee: Jimmy Greville

Oct 10 Round 5	Raharney	2-14 - 1-14	Clonkill	TEG Cusack Park
				Referee: James McGrath

=== Knockout stage ===
==== Semi-final ====
Oct 24 Semi-final	Clonkill	0-15 - 0-18	Castletown Geoghegan	TEG Cusack Park

==== Final ====
Nov 7 Final	Raharney	0-21 - 0-18	Castletown Geoghegan	TEG Cusack Park
