= David O'Reilly (hurler) =

Irish hurler

Personal information
- Native name: Daithí Ó Raghallaigh (Irish)
- Born: 2004 (age 21–22) Castletown Geoghegan; County Westmeath, Ireland
- Occupation: Hurler

Sport
- Sport: Hurling
Club
- Years: Club
- 2022-present: Castletown-Geoghegan
Club titles
- Westmeath titles: 2
College
- Years: College
- 2023-present: University of Limerick
Inter-county
- Years: County
- 2024-: Westmeath
Inter-county titles
- Leinster titles: 0
- All-Irelands: 0
- NHL: 0
- All Stars: 0

David O'Reilly (born 2004) is an Irish hurler. At club level he plays with Castletown-Geoghegan and at inter-county level with the Westmeath senior hurling team.

== Career ==
O'Reilly first played hurling at juvenile and underage levels with the Castletown-Geoghegan club. He won consecutive Westmeath MHC titles in 2020 and 2021, while also playing both hurling and Gaelic football as a schoolboy at Moate Community School. O'Reilly progressed to adult club level and was man of the match when Castletown Geoghegan beat Clonkill to win the Westmeath SHC title in 2022. He also won an All-Ireland Freshers' hurling title with the University of Limerick in 2024.

O'Reilly first appeared on the inter-county scene with Westmeath as a member of the minor team in 2021. He later progressed to the under-20 team. O'Reilly was drafted onto the senior team in 2024.

== Honours ==
University of Limerick

- All-Ireland Freshers' Hurling Championship: 2024

Castletown-Geoghegan

- Westmeath Senior Hurling Championship: 2022. 2024
- Westmeath Minor Hurling Championship: 2020, 2021
