= 1990 Westmeath Senior Hurling Championship =

Hurling competition

- Dates: Jul 1 - Aug 25, 1990
- Teams: 9
- Champions: Castletown Geoghegan (10th title); Ger Jackson (captain); Jim Roche (manager)
- Runners-up: Raharney; James Farrelly (captain); Denis O'Keefe (manager)

Tournament statistics
- Matches played: 7
- Top scorer: Eamonn Clarke (3-13)

The 1990 Westmeath Senior Hurling Championship was the 87th staging of the Westmeath Senior Hurling Championship since its establishment by the Westmeath County Board in 1903.

The championship ran as a straight-knockout format, with each team afforded one loss before exiting the championship. Brownstown entered the championship at the quarter-final stage as defending champions, but were eliminated in the semi-finals by Raharney. Castletown Geoghegan, Castlepollard, Clonkill, Cullion, Lough Lene Gaels, Ringtown, and Turin rounded out the field.

The final was played on August 25 at Cusack Park in Mullingar between Castletown Geoghegan and Raharney, in their first match-ups against each other in a final since 1984. Castletown Geoghegan won the contest 1-8 to 1-7 to win the Westmeath Examiner Cup for the first time since 1986, and their tenth title overall.

== Results ==
=== Semi-Finals ===
28 Jul Semi-Final	Raharney	2-4 - 1-4	Brownstown	Cusack Park

4 Aug Semi-Final	Castletown Geoghegan	4-11 - 2-6	Ringtown	Cusack Park

=== Final ===
25 Aug Final	Castletown Geoghegan	1-8 - 1-7	Raharney	Cusack Park
