= 2007 Westmeath Senior Hurling Championship =

Annual hurling competition season

- Champions: Clonkill (10th title); Paddy Dowdall (captain); Pat O'Toole (manager)
- Runners-up: Lough Lene Gaels

The 2007 Westmeath Senior Hurling Championship was the 103rd staging of the Westmeath Senior Hurling Championship since its establishment by the Westmeath County Board in 1903.

Raharney were the defending champions.

The final was played on 14 October 2007 at Cusack Park in Mullingar, between Clonkill and Lough Lene Gaels, in what was their second meeting in the final overall. Clonkill won the match by 1–15 to 0–05 to claim their 10th championship title overall and a first title in six years.

== Results ==
=== Final ===
14 October 2007 Final	Clonkill	1-15 - 0-05	Lough Lene Gaels	Cusack Park
