= 1982 Westmeath Senior Hurling Championship =

Hurling competition

- Dates: May 9 - Sept 12, 1982
- Teams: 10
- Champions: Castletown Geoghegan (8th title); Ger Jackson (captain)
- Runners-up: Brownstown; Martin Carr (captain)

The 1982 Westmeath Senior Hurling Championship was the 78th staging of the Westmeath Senior Hurling Championship since its establishment by the Westmeath County Board in 1903.

Brownstown entered the championship as defending champions. Castletown Geoghegan, Castlepollard, Clonkill, Cullion, Delvin, Lough Lene Gaels, Ringtown, St Brigid's, and Turin rounded out the field.

The final was played on August 25 at Cusack Park in Mullingar between Castletown Geoghegan and Brownstown, in their first match-ups against each other in a final since 1977, and a third-straight appearance for Brownstown. Castletown Geoghegan won the contest 0-14 to 1-6 to win the Westmeath Examiner Cup for the first time since 1979, and their eighth title overall.

== Results ==
=== Semi-Finals ===
15 Aug Semi-Final	Brownstown	2-16 - 2-8	Ringtownn	Cusack Park

15 Aug Semi-Final	Castletown Geoghegan	3-13 - 1-7	Cullion	Cusack Park

=== Final ===
12 Sep Final	Castletown Geoghegan	0-14 - 1-6	Brownstown	Cusack Park
				Referee: Ber Murtagh
