= 2003 Westmeath Senior Hurling Championship =

Annual hurling competition season

- Sponsor: Cassidy's Hotel
- Champions: Castlepollard (13th title); Darren McCormack (captain)
- Runners-up: Clonkill; Seán Loughlin (captain)

The 2003 Westmeath Senior Hurling Championship was the 99th staging of the Westmeath Senior Hurling Championship since its establishment by the Westmeath County Board in 1903.

Lough Lene Gaels were the defending champions.

The final was played on 7 September 2003 at Cusack Park in Mullingar, between Castlepollard and Clonkill, in what was their sixth meeting in the final overall. Castlepollard won the match by 1–10 to 1–09 to claim their 13th championship title overall and a first title in six years.

== Results ==
=== Final ===
8 September 2003 Final	Castlepollard	1-10 - 1-09	Clonkill	Cusack Park
				Referee: B Kelly (St Oliver Plunketts)
