= 2005 Westmeath Senior Hurling Championship =

Annual hurling competition season

- Teams: 8
- Sponsor: Cassidy's Hotel
- Champions: Castlepollard (14th title); John Paul Murray (captain)
- Runners-up: Lough Lene Gaels; Mark Briody (captain)

The 2005 Westmeath Senior Hurling Championship was the 101st staging of the Westmeath Senior Hurling Championship since its establishment by the Westmeath County Board in 1903.

Castletown Geoghegan were the defending champions, however, they were beaten by Castlepollard in the quarter-finals.

The final, a replay, was played on 30 October 2005 at Cusack Park in Mullingar, between Castlepollard and Lough Lene Gaels, in what was their fourth meeting in the final overall. Castlepollard won the match by 2–09 to 0–04 to claim their 14th championship title overall and a first title in two years. It remains their last title success.

== Results ==
=== Final ===
16 October 2005 Final	Castlepollard	1-08 - 0-11	Lough Lene Gaels	Cusack Park

=== Final replay ===
30 October 2005 Final replay	Castlepollard	2-09 - 0-04	Lough Lene Gaels	Cusack Park
