= 2026 Westmeath Senior Hurling Championship =

- Dates: 4 July - 18 October 2026
- Teams: 6
- Sponsor: Slevin's Coaches
- Champions: Lough Lene Gaels (8th title)
- Runners-up: Raharney
- Relegated: Fr Dalton's

The 2026 Westmeath Senior Hurling Championship was the 122nd staging of the Westmeath Senior Hurling Championship.

A total of six teams contested the Westmeath Senior Hurling Championship. All six teams enter the round-robin stage, playing each other once, guaranteeing at least five championship games. The first round draws of games were streamed live via YouTube on the 27th of May, with the full schedule released online.

Castletown Geoghegan enter the championship as defending champions, defeating Lough Lene Gaels 3-15 - 2-9 in last year's final, but were eliminated at the semi-final stage by Raharney.

Delvin were promoted to the championship as last year's Senior B winners, replacing Castlepollard who were relegated last year. Clonkill, Fr Daltons, and Raharney round out the field.

Fr Daltons were relegated to Senior B for 2027 on September 20, after losing all five games in the group stage.

The final was contested at Cusack Park in Mullingar on October 18, Lough Lene Gaels and Raharney. Lough Lene Gaels won the contest 1-16 - 0-16 to win the Westmeatn Examiner Cup, ending a twenty-four year drought, and their eighth overall.

== Group stage ==
Advance to final Advance to semi-finals Relegated to Senior 'B'

Team	Matches				Score			Pts
Team	Pld	W	D	L	For	Against	Diff	Pts
Lough Lene Gaels	5	5	0	0	158	117	41	10
Raharney	5	4	0	1	131	81	50	8
Castletown Geoghegan	5	3	0	2	145	104	41	6
Clonkill	5	2	0	3	145	110	35	4
Delvin	5	1	0	4	93	205	-112	2
Fr Dalton's	5	0	0	5	86	141	-55	0

=== Fixtures ===
4 Jul Round 1	Fr Dalton's	0-11 - 1-22	Castletown Geoghegan	TEG Cusack Park
				Referee: Mickey Dan Murtagh

5 Jul Round 1	Clonkill	1-9 - 1-18	Raharney	Robinstown
				Referee: Barry Nea

5 Jul Round 1	Delvin	0-22 - 6-30	Lough Lene Gaels	TEG Cusack Park
				Referee: Caymon Flynn

17 Jul Round 2	Lough Lene Gaels	3-19 - 0-19	Fr Dalton's	TEG Cusack Park
				Referee: Caymon Flynn

18 Jul Round 2	Raharney	4-24 - 0-12	Delvin	The Downs
				Referee: Kenneth Gunning

18 Jul Round 2	Castletown Geoghegan	1-25 - 2-17	Clonkill	TEG Cusack Park
				Referee: Barry Kelly

31 Jul Round 3	Fr Dalton's	0-15 - 3-15	Raharney	Pairc Mhic Eochagain
				Referee: Bernard Heaney

1 Aug Round 3	Clonkill	7-24 - 1-13	Delvin	TEG Cusack Park
				Referee: James Greville

2 Aug Round 3	Castletown Geoghegan	1-22 - 0-27	Lough Lene Gaels	TEG Cusack Park
				Referee: Barry Nea

22 Aug Round 4	Lough Lene Gaels	4-15 - 2-19	Clonkill	TEG Cusack Park
				Referee: Caymon Flynn

23 Aug Round 4	Delvin	3-15 - 3-14	Fr Dalton's	TEG Cusack Park
				Referee: Mickey Dan Murtagh

23 Aug Round 4	Raharney	0-24 - 0-14	Castletown Geoghegan	TEG Cusack Park
				Referee: Barry Kelly

20 Sep Round 5	Lough Lene Gaels	2-22 - 1-23	Raharney	TEG Cusack Park
				Referee: Caymon Flynn

20 Sep Round 5	Fr Dalton's	3-09 - 6-22	Clonkill	Dovida Lakepoint Park
				Referee: Kenneth Gunning

20 Sep Round 5	Castletown Geoghegan	7-32 - 2-13	Delvin	Coralstown-Kinnegad GAA
				Referee: Barry Nea

=== Knockout stage ===
Semifinals
2	Raharney	1-23
3	Castletown Geoghegan	1-19

Final
1	Lough Lene Gaels	1-16
Raharney	0-16

=== Fixtures ===
4 Oct Semi-Final	Raharney	1-23 - 1-19	Castletown Geoghegan	TEG Cusack Park
				Referee: Mickey Dan Murtagh

18 Oct Final	Lough Lene Gaels	1-16 - 0-16	Raharney	TEG Cusack Park
				Referee: Caymon Flynn
