= 1998 Westmeath Senior Hurling Championship =

Annual hurling competition season

- Champions: Lough Lene Gaels (4th title)
- Runners-up: Clonkill

The 1998 Westmeath Senior Hurling Championship was the 94th staging of the Westmeath Senior Hurling Championship since its establishment by the Westmeath County Board in 1903.

Castlepollard were the defending champions.

The final was played on 11 October 1998 at Cusack Park in Mullingar, between Lough Lene Gaels and Clonkill, in what was their first ever meeting in the final. Lough Lene Gaels won the match by 1–10 to 0–09 to claim their fourth championship title overall and a first title in two years.

== Results ==
=== Final ===
| 11 October 1998 Final | Lough Lene Gaels | 1-10 - 0-09 | Clonkill | Cusack Park |
