= Joe Clarke (Westmeath hurler) =

Irish hurler

Personal information
- Native name: Seosamh Ó Cléirigh (Irish)
- Born: 1986 (age 39–40) Castletown Geoghegan, County Westmeath, Ireland

Sport
- Sport: Hurling
- Position: Midfield
Club
- Years: Club
- 2002-present: Castletown Geoghegan
Club titles
- Westmeath titles: 2
Inter-county*
Years	County	Apps (scores)
2004-2013	Westmeath	12 (0-1)
Inter-county titles
- Leinster titles: 0
- All-Irelands: 0
- NHL: 0
- All Stars: 0
- *Inter County team apps and scores correct as of 16:46, 12 June 2014.

Joseph Clarke (born 1986) is an Irish hurler who played as a midfielder for the Westmeath senior team.

Born in Castletown Geoghegan, County Westmeath, Clarke first arrived on the inter-county scene at the age of sixteen when he first linked up with the Westmeath minor team, before later joining the under-21 side. Clarke made his senior debut during the 2005 Christy Ring Cup. Since then he has won three Christy Ring Cup medals and one National League (Division 2) medal.

At club level Clarke is a two-time championship medallist with Castletown Geoghegan.

== Honours ==
=== Team ===
Castletown Geoghegan

- Westmeath Senior Hurling Championship (2): 2004, 2013
- Westmeath Under-21 Hurling Championship (2): 2005, 2006
- Westmeath Minor Hurling Championship (2): 2002, 2003

Westmeath

- Christy Ring Cup (3): 2005, 2007, 2010
- National League (Division 2) (1): 2008
