= Aonghus Clarke =

Irish hurler

Personal information
- Native name: Aonghus Ó Cléirigh (Irish)
- Born: 1993 (age 32–33) Castletown Geoghegan, County Westmeath, Ireland
- Height: 5 ft 10 in (178 cm)

Sport
- Sport: Hurling
- Position: Centre back
Club
- Years: Club
- Castletown Geoghegan
Club titles
- Westmeath titles: 4
Inter-county
- Years: County
- 2012-present: Westmeath
Inter-county titles
- Leinster titles: 0
- All-Irelands: 0
- NHL: 0
- All Stars: 0

Aonghus Clarke (born 1993) is an Irish hurler. At club level he plays with Castletown Geoghegan and at inter-county level with the Westmeath senior hurling team.

== Career ==
Clarke first played hurling to a high standard as a student at Coláiste Mhuire in Mullingar. He was part of the team that beat St Benildus College from Stillorgan by 1–18 to 1–04 to win the Leinster Colleges SBHC title in 2011.

At club level, Clarke began his career at juvenile and underage levels with Castletown Geoghegan and won numerous Westmeath MAHC and U21AHC titles. He subsequently progressed to adult level and won four Westmeath SHC medals between 2013 and 2024.

Clarke first played for Westmeath at inter-county level during a two-year tenure with the minor team team. He later progressed to the under-21 team but ended his underage career without success. Clarke was just out of the minor grade when he joined the senior team. His inter-county honours include three National Hurling League Division 2A medals, including two as team captain. Clarke also won a Joe McDonagh Cup medal in 2021.

== Personal life ==
His brother, Joe Clarke, has also played for the Westmeath senior team.

== Honours ==
Coláiste Mhuire

- Leinster Colleges Senior B Hurling Championship: 2011

Castletown Geoghegan

- Westmeath Senior Hurling Championship: 2013, 2017, 2022, 2024 (c)
- Westmeath Under-21 A Hurling Championship: 2013, 2014
- Westmeath Minor A Hurling Championship: 2009, 2010, 2011

Westmeath

- Joe McDonagh Cup: 2021
- National Hurling League Division 2A: 2016 (c), 2019 (c), 2022

Sporting positions
Preceded by Eoin Price	Westmeath Senior Hurling Captain; 2015-2017	Succeeded by Tommy Doyle
Preceded by Tommy Doyle	Westmeath Senior Hurling Captain; 2019	Succeeded by Eoin Price
