= 1997 Westmeath Senior Hurling Championship =

Annual hurling competition season

- Sponsor: Portcastle
- Champions: Castlepollard (12th title); Jody Murray (captain)
- Runners-up: Lough Lene Gaels; Francis O'Farrell (captain)

The 1997 Westmeath Senior Hurling Championship was the 93rd staging of the Westmeath Senior Hurling Championship since its establishment by the Westmeath County Board in 1903.

Lough Lene Gaels were the defending champions.

The final, a replay, was played on 9 November 1997 at Cusack Park in Mullingar, between Castlepollard and Lough Lene Gaels, in what was their first ever meeting in the final. Castlepollard won the match by 2–11 to 2–08 to claim their 13th championship title overall and a first title in two years.

== Results ==
=== Final ===
19 October 1997 Final	Castlepollard	2-07 - 0-13	Lough Lene Gaels	Cusack Park

=== Final replay ===
9 November 1997 Final replay	Castlepollard	2-11 - 2-08	Lough Lene Gaels	Cusack Park
