= Killian Cosgrove =

Irish hurler (born 1987)

Personal information
- Native name: Cillian Mac Oscair (Irish)
- Born: 25 April 1987 (age 39) Collinstown, County Westmeath, Ireland

Sport
- Sport: Hurling
- Position: Full-forward
Club
- Years: Club
- Lough Lene Gaels
Club titles
- Westmeath titles: 0
Inter-county
- Years: County
- 2005-2009: Westmeath
Inter-county titles
- Leinster titles: 0
- All-Irelands: 0
- NHL: 0
- All Stars: 0

Killian Cosgrove (born 25 April 1987) is an Irish hurler who played as a full-forward for the Westmeath senior team.

Born in Collinstown, County Westmeath, Cloonan first arrived on the inter-county scene when he first linked up with the Westmeath minor team, before later joining the under-21 side. He made his senior debut in the 2004 National Hurling League. Cosgrove went on to play a key role for Westmeath, and won one Christy Ring Cup medal in 2005.

At club level Cosgrove plays with Lough Lene Gaels.

Cosgrove was forced to retire due to injury after the 2009 Christy Ring Cup.

His father, Michael, also played hurling with Westmeath and later served as manager of the team.

== Honours ==
=== Player ===
Westmeath

- Christy Ring Cup (1): 2005
