= 1975 Westmeath Senior Hurling Championship =

Annual hurling competition season

- Champions: Lough Lene Gaels (1st title); Gene O'Donnell (captain)
- Runners-up: Raharney; Tosh Cleary (captain)

The 1975 Westmeath Senior Hurling Championship was the 71st staging of the Westmeath Senior Hurling Championship since its establishment by the Westmeath County Board in 1903.

Castlepollard entered the Championship as defending champions.

The final was played on 14 September 1975 at Cusack Park in Mullingar, between Lough Lene Gaels and Raharney. Lough Lene Gaels appeared in their first county final since their establishment six years earlier, while Raharney made their third straight appearance. Lough Lene Gaels won the contest 2–09 to 1–05 to claim their first ever championship.

== Results ==
=== Final ===
14 September Final	Lough Lene Gaels	2-09 - 1-05	Raharney	Cusack Park
	J. Walshe (1-6), B. Connell (1-1), M. Conaty (0-1), G. O'Donnell (0-1)		R. Smyth (1-0), N. Weir (0-3), M. Flanagan (0-1), F. McManus (0-1)	Referee: P Collins
