= 1976 Westmeath Senior Hurling Championship =

Annual hurling competition season

- Champions: Lough Lene Gaels (2nd title); Michael Cosgrove (captain)
- Runners-up: Raharney; Mickey Flanagan (captain)

The 1976 Westmeath Senior Hurling Championship was the 72nd staging of the Westmeath Senior Hurling Championship since its establishment by the Westmeath County Board in 1903.

Lough Lene Gaels were the defending champions.

The final was played on 19 September 1976 at Cusack Park in Mullingar, between Lough Lene Gaels and Raharney, in what was their second consecutive meeting in the final. Lough Lene Gaels won the match by 2–07 to 3–03 to claim their second consecutive championship title.

== Results ==
=== Final ===
19 September 1976 Final	Lough Lene Gaels	2-07 - 3-03	Raharney	Cusack Park
