= 2002 Westmeath Senior Hurling Championship =

Annual hurling competition season

- Champions: Lough Lene Gaels (7th title); John Gavigan (captain); Michael Cosgrove (manager)
- Runners-up: Castletown Geoghegan

The 2002 Westmeath Senior Hurling Championship was the 98th staging of the Westmeath Senior Hurling Championship since its establishment by the Westmeath County Board in 1903.

Clonkill were the defending champions.

The final was played on 15 September 2002 at Cusack Park in Mullingar, between Lough Lene Gaels and Castletown Geoghegan, in what was their second meeting in the final overall. Lough Lene Gaels won the match by 4–11 to 2–12 to claim their seventh championship title overall and a fifth title in seven years.

== Results ==
=== Final ===
15 September 2002 Final	Lough Lene Gaels	4-11 - 2-12	Castletown Geoghegan	Cusack Park
