= 1996 Westmeath Senior Hurling Championship =

Annual hurling competition season

- Champions: Lough Lene Gaels (3rd title); Brendan Williams (captain)
- Runners-up: Castletown Geoghegan; Peter Dalton (captain)

The 1996 Westmeath Senior Hurling Championship was the 92nd staging of the Westmeath Senior Hurling Championship since its establishment by the Westmeath County Board in 1903.

Castlepollard were the defending champions.

The final was played on 13 October 1996 at Cusack Park in Mullingar, between Lough Lene Gaels and Castletown Geoghegan, in what was their first ever meeting in the final. Lough Lene Gaels won the match by 2–07 to 0–09 to claim their third championship title overall and a first title in 20 years.

== Results ==
=== Final ===
13 October 1996 Final	Lough Lene Gaels	2-07 - 0-09	Castletown Geoghegan	Cusack Park
