= Robbie Greville =

Irish hurler

Personal information
- Native name: Roibeárd Ó Griabháil (Irish)
- Born: 1994 (age 31–32) Raharney, County Westmeath, Ireland
- Occupation: Student

Sport
- Sport: Hurling
- Position: Left wing-back
Club
- Years: Club
- 2011-present: Raharney
Club titles
- Westmeath titles: 0
Inter-county*
Years	County	Apps (scores)
2012-	Westmeath	1 (0-00)
Inter-county titles
- Leinster titles: 0
- All-Irelands: 0
- NHL: 0
- All Stars: 0
- *Inter County team apps and scores correct as of 22:09, 21 May 2012.

Robert "Robbie" Greville (born 1994) is an Irish hurler who plays as a left wing-back for the Westmeath minor and senior teams.

Greville made his first appearance for the team during the 2012 championship and immediately became a regular member of the starting fifteen.

At club level Greville plays with the Raharney club.
