= 1999 Westmeath Senior Hurling Championship =

Annual hurling competition season

- Champions: Lough Lene Gaels (5th title); John Kennedy (captain)
- Runners-up: Castlepollard
- Relegated: Ringtown

The 1999 Westmeath Senior Hurling Championship was the 95th staging of the Westmeath Senior Hurling Championship since its establishment by the Westmeath County Board in 1903.

Lough Lene Gaels were the defending champions.

The final was played on 24 October 1999 at Cusack Park in Mullingar, between Lough Lene Gaels and Castlepollard, in what was their second meeting in the final overall. Lough Lene Gaels won the match by 1–13 to 1–11 to claim their fifth championship title overall and a second consecutive title.

== Results ==
=== Final ===
24 October Final	Lough Lene Gaels	1-13 - 1-11	Castlepollard	Cusack Park
	D Cunningham (1-0), G Briody (0-3), J Kennedy (0-3), B Williams (0-2), S Fitzpatrick (0-1), M Shaw (0-1), K Williams (0-1)		S McLoughlin (1-6), P Callery (0-1), A Devine (0-1), L Kennedy (0-2), R McLoughlin (0-1)	Referee: T O'Dowd
