= 2000 Westmeath Senior Hurling Championship =

Annual hurling competition season

- Champions: Lough Lene Gaels (6th title); John Kennedy (captain)
- Runners-up: Castlepollard; Ollie Devine (captain)

The 2000 Westmeath Senior Hurling Championship was the 96th staging of the Westmeath Senior Hurling Championship since its establishment by the Westmeath County Board in 1903.

Lough Lene Gaels were the defending champions.

The final was played on 17 September 2000 at Cusack Park in Mullingar, between Lough Lene Gaels and Castlepollard, in what was their second consecutive meeting in the final. Lough Lene Gaels won the match by 3–08 to 0–14 to claim their sixth championship title overall and a third consecutive title.

== Results ==
=== Final ===
17 September 2000 Final	Lough Lene Gaels	3-08 - 0-14	Castlepollard	Cusack Park
