= 1995 Westmeath Senior Hurling Championship =

Annual hurling competition season

- Champions: Castlepollard (11th title); Seáb McLoughlin (captain)
- Runners-up: Raharney; Declan Mullen (captain)

The 1995 Westmeath Senior Hurling Championship was the 91st staging of the Westmeath Senior Hurling Championship since its establishment by the Westmeath County Board in 1903.

Raharney were the defending champions.

The final was played on 1 October 1995 at Cusack Park in Mullingar, between Castlepollard and Raharney, in what was their second consecutive meeting in the final. Castlepollard won the match by 1–10 to 2–06 to claim their 11th championship title overall and a first title in 21 years.

== Results ==
=== Final ===
| 1 October 1995 Final | Castlepollard | 1-10 - 2-06 | Raharney | Cusack Park |
