= 2001 Westmeath Senior Hurling Championship =

Annual hurling competition season

- Champions: Clonkill (9th title); Paddy Walsh (captain); Willie Murtagh (captain)
- Runners-up: Cullion

Tournament statistics
- Top scorer: Colin Whyte (1–25)

The 2001 Westmeath Senior Hurling Championship was the 97th staging of the Westmeath Senior Hurling Championship since its establishment by the Westmeath County Board in 1903.

Castlepollard were the defending champions.

The final was played on 16 September 2001 at Cusack Park in Mullingar, between Clonkill and Cullion, in what was their first ever meeting in the final. Clonkill won the match by 2–11 to 2–05 to claim their ninth championship title overall and a first title in 32 years.

Cullion's Colin Whyte was the championship's top scorer with 1–25.

== Results ==
=== Final ===
16 September 2001 Final	Clonkill	2-11 - 2-05	Cullion	Cusack Park
	B Murtagh 0-3, G Fagan 0-3, P Dowdall 1-0, E Loughlin 1-0, S Loughlin 0-2, C Kelly 0-1, A Mitchell 0-1, M Scally 0-1.		D Gillen 1-2, F Shaw 1-0, C Whyte 0-1, R Galvin 0-1.
