= Michael Cosgrove =

Irish hurler (born 1954)

Personal information
- Native name: Mícheál Mac Oscair (Irish)
- Born: 1954 (age 71–72) Collinstown, County Westmeath, Ireland
- Occupation: Builder

Sport
- Sport: Hurling
- Position: Corner-forward
Club
- Years: Club
- Lough Lene Gaels
Club titles
- Westmeath titles: 2
Inter-county
- Years: County
- 1974-1993: Westmeath
Inter-county titles
- Leinster titles: 0
- All-Irelands: 0
- NHL: 0
- All Stars: 0

Michael Cosgrove (born 1954) is an Irish former hurler who played as a corner-forward for the Westmeath senior team.

Born in Collinstown, County Westmeath, Cosgrove first arrived on the inter-county scene when he first linked up with the Westmeath minor team, before later joining the under-21 side. He joined the senior panel for the 1974 championship. Cosgrove went on to play a key role for Westmeath for over a decade, and won two All-Ireland "B" Championship medals.

As a member of the Leinster inter-provincial team on one occasion, Cosgrove enjoyed little success in the Railway Cup. At club level he is a two-time championship medallist with Lough Lene Gaels. Cosgrove also won three New York senior championship medals with the Westmeath club.

Cosgrove's retirement came when he emigrated to the United States in 1987, however, he made one final appearance for Westmeath in 1993.

In retirement from playing Cosgrove became involved in team management and coaching. As physical trainer and manager, he guided Lough Lene Gaels to five championship titles. Cosgrove later served as a selector and manager to the Westmeath senior hurling team.

His son, Killian, also played hurling with Westmeath.

== Honours ==
=== Player ===
Lough Lene Gaels

- Westmeath Senior Hurling Championship (2): 1975, 1976

Westmeath Club

- New York Senior Hurling Championship (3): 1990, 1992, 1993

Westmeath

- All-Ireland Senior B Hurling Championship (2): 1975, 1984
- Walsh Cup (1): 1982

=== Coach ===
Lough Lene Gaels

- Westmeath Senior Hurling Championship (5): 1996, 1998, 1999, 2000, 2002

Sporting positions
Preceded by	Westmeath Senior Hurling Captain; 1976	Succeeded by
Preceded by Pat Delaney	Westmeath Senior Hurling Manager; 1998-2001	Succeeded by Michael Conneely
