= Cormac Boyle =

Irish hurler

Personal information
- Native name: Cormac Ó Baoill (Irish)
- Born: 1991 (age 34–35) Raharney, County Westmeath, Ireland

Sport
- Sport: Hurling
- Position: Midfield
Club
- Years: Club
- Raharney
Club titles
- Westmeath titles: 2
College
- Years: College
- University College Dublin
College titles
- Sigerson titles: 0
- Fitzgibbon titles: 0
Inter-county
- Years: County
- 2012-2024: Westmeath
Inter-county titles
- Leinster titles: 0
- All-Irelands: 0
- NHL: 0
- All Stars: 0

Cormac Boyle (born 1991) is an Irish hurler. At club level he plays with Raharney and at inter-county level is a former member of the Westmeath senior hurling team.

== Career ==
Boyle first came to hurling prominence at juvenile and underage levels with the Raharney club. He eventually joined the club's top adult team at senior level and was part of their County Championship successes in 2014 and 2016. Boyle first appeared on the inter-county scene during a two-year stint with the Westmeath minor hurling team before later lining out at under-21 level as a dual player. He joined the Westmeath senior hurling team in 2012. Boyle has since won two National League Division 2A titles and captained the team to the 2021 Joe McDonagh Cup title.

== Honours ==
Raharney

- Westmeath Senior Hurling Championship: 2014, 2016

Westmeath

- Joe McDonagh Cup: 2021 (c)
- National Hurling League Division 2A: 2016, 2019 (c)

Sporting positions
Preceded by Eoin Price	Westmeath Senior Hurling Captain; 2021	Succeeded by Incumbent
Achievements
Preceded by Conor McCann	Joe McDonagh Cup Final winning captain 2021	Succeeded by Incumbent
