= John McGrath (Westmeath hurler) =

Irish hurler

John "Jobber" McGrath
Personal information
- Native name: Seán Mac Craith (Irish)
- Nickname: Jobber
- Born: 1918 Rickardstown, County Westmeath, Ireland
- Died: 14 April 1980 (aged 52) Rickardstown, County Westmeath, Ireland

Sport
- Sport: Hurling
- Position: Forward
Clubs
- Years: Club
- Rickardstown; Lough Lene Gaels
Club titles
- Westmeath titles: 3
Inter-county
Years	County	Apps (scores)
1950-1965	Westmeath	22 (9-54)
Inter-county titles
- Leinster titles: 0
- All-Irelands: 0
- NHL: 0

John "Jobber" McGrath (1928 – 14 April 1980) was an Irish sportsperson. He played hurling with his local club Rickardstown and with the Westmeath senior inter-county team from 1950 until 1965. McGrath was later recognised as "one of the greatest players never to have won an All-Ireland medal".

== Playing career ==
=== Club ===
McGrath played his club hurling with his local Rickardstown club and won his first senior county title in 1953. McGrath added to his collection in 1959 and 1963 when he captured two more county championship medals. He finished his playing career with Lough Lene Gaels (who were an amalgamation between Collinstown, Fore, Glenidan and McGrath's club Rickardstown), winning a junior medal with the club in 1973.

=== Inter-county ===
McGrath first came to prominence on the inter-county scene with the Westmeath minor hurling team in the 1940s. In 1950 McGrath made his debut for the Westmeath senior team, beginning a fifteen-year inter-county career. During this era he enjoyed minimal success with the county as Westmeath were one of the minnows of the Leinster Championship.

=== Provincial ===
McGrath also lined out with Leinster in the inter-provincial hurling competition, and won his sole Railway Cup medal in 1956 as Leinster defeated Munster.
