= David Williams (hurler) =

Irish hurler

Personal information
- Native name: Daithí Mac Liam (Irish)
- Born: 2004 (age 21–22) Collinstown; County Westmeath, Ireland

Sport
- Sport: Hurling
- Position: Left corner-forward
Club
- Years: Club
- 2022-present: Lough Lene Gaels
Club titles
- Westmeath titles: 0
Inter-county
- Years: County
- 2023-present: Westmeath
Inter-county titles
- Leinster titles: 0
- All-Irelands: 0
- NHL: 0
- All Stars: 0

David Williams (born 2004) is an Irish hurler. At club level he plays with Lough Lene Gaels and at inter-county level with the Westmeath senior hurling team.

== Career ==
Williams first played hurling at juvenile and underage levels with the Na Piarsaigh amalgamation. He won a Westmeath U19HC title in 2023. Williams subsequently joined the Lough Lene Gaels adult club and was part of the team beaten by Raharney in the 2023 final.

Williams first appeared on the inter-county scene with Westmeath during a two-year tenure with the minor team. He later progressed to the under-20 team. Williams was drafted onto the senior team in 2023.

== Honours ==
Na Piarsaigh

- Westmeath Under-19 Division 1 Hurling Championship: 2023
