= 1974 Westmeath Senior Hurling Championship =

Annual hurling competition season

- Champions: Castlepollard (10th title); Mickey Fagan (captain)
- Runners-up: Raharney; Jimmy Nugent (captain)

The 1974 Westmeath Senior Hurling Championship was the 70th staging of the Westmeath Senior Hurling Championship since its establishment by the Westmeath County Board in 1903.

Raharney were the defending champions.

The final was played on 29 September 1974 at Cusack Park in Mullingar, between Castlepollard and Raharney, in what was their third meeting in the final overall. Castlepollard won the match by 1–08 to 1–04 to claim their 10th championship title overall and a first title in eight years.

== Results ==
=== Final ===
29 September 1974 Final	Castlepollard	1-08 - 1-04	Raharney	Cusack Park
