= 2020 Westmeath Senior Hurling Championship =

Annual hurling competition season

- Dates: 26 July - 4 October 2020
- Teams: 6
- Sponsor: Slevin's Coaches
- Champions: Clonkill (17th title); Brendan Murtagh (captain); Pat O'Toole (manager)
- Runners-up: Castletown Geoghegan

The 2020 Westmeath Senior Hurling Championship was the 116th staging of the Westmeath Senior Hurling Championship since its establishment by the Westmeath County Board in 1903. The championship began on 26 July 2020 and ended on 4 October 2020.

Clonkill entered the championship as the defending champions.

The final was played on 4 October 2020 at TEG Cusack Park, between Clonkill and Castletown Geoghegan, in what was their second successive meeting in a final. Clonkill won the match by 3–16 to 2–16—the first ever to be settled in extra time—to claim their 17th championship title overall and a third title in succession.

== Results ==
=== Final ===
4 October 2020 Final	Clonkill	3-16 - 2-16 (aet)	Castletown Geoghegan	TEG Cusack Park
	Brendan Murtagh 0-12 (8f, 1 “65”), Niall Mitchell 2-0, Jordan Smyth 1-1, Eoin Price 0-1, Peadar Scally 0-1, Luke Loughlin 0-1.	Report	Aonghus Clarke 1-6 (3f), Niall O’Brien 0-8 (6f), Joe Clarke 1-1, Plunkett Maxwell 0-1.	Referee: C Flynn
