= Conor Hearne =

Irish hurler

Personal information
- Native name: Conchúr Ó hEathírn (Irish)
- Born: 1998 (age 27–28) Screen, County Wexford, Ireland
- Occupation: Student

Sport
- Sport: Hurling
- Position: Midfield
Club
- Years: Club
- Shelamliers
Club titles
- Wexford titles: 2
College
- Years: College
- DCU Dóchas Éireann
College titles
- Fitzgibbon titles: 0
Inter-county*
Years	County	Apps (scores)
2021-	Wexford	1 (0-00)
Inter-county titles
- Leinster titles: 0
- All-Irelands: 0
- NHL: 0
- All Stars: 0
- *Inter County team apps and scores correct as of 21:45, 27 June 2021.

Conor Hearne (born 1998) is an Irish hurler who plays for Wexford Championship club Shelmaliers and at inter-county level with the Wexford senior hurling team. He usually lines out at midfield.

== Career ==
Hearne first came to hurling prominence at juvenile and underage levels with the Shelmaliers club before eventually joining the club's senior team. His performances during the club's 2020 County Championship-winning season earned him the Wexford Club Hurler of the Year award. Hearne first played at inter-county level with the Wexford minor team during the 2016 Leinster Minor Championship. His performances with DCU Dóchas Éireann during the Fitzgibbon Cup earned his inclusion on the Wexford senior hurling team and he made his debut during the 2021 National Hurling League.

== Career statistics ==
As of 26 June 2021

Team	Year	National League			Leinster		All-Ireland		Total	
Team	Year	Division	Apps	Score	Apps	Score	Apps	Score	Apps	Score
Wexford	2021	Division 1B	3	1-01	1	0-00	0	0-00	4	1-01
Career total			3	1-01	1	0-00	0	0-00	4	1-01

== Honours ==
Shelmaliers

- Wexford Senior Hurling Championship (2): 2020, 2026
