= Killian Doyle =

Irish hurler

Personal information
- Native name: Cillian Ó Dúil (Irish)
- Born: 18 April 1997 (age 29) Raharney, County Westmeath, Ireland
- Occupation: Student

Sport
- Sport: Hurling
- Position: Centre-forward
Club
- Years: Club
- 2014-present: Raharney
Club titles
- Westmeath titles: 2
College
- Years: College
- 2015-present: DCU
Inter-county*
Years	County	Apps (scores)
2016-present	Westmeath	14 (3-79)
Inter-county titles
- Leinster titles: 0
- All-Irelands: 0
- NHL: 0
- All Stars: 0
- *Inter County team apps and scores correct as of 13:34, 6 June 2022.

Killian Doyle (born 18 April 1997) is an Irish hurler who plays as a centre-forward with the Westmeath senior team.

Born in Raharney, County Westmeath, Doyle developed as a hurler during his secondary schooling at St. Joseph's Secondary School in Rochfortbridge. Here he was an All-Ireland runner-up in 2012. Doyle simultaneously made his first appearances for the Raharney club at underage levels, before winning county senior championship medals in 2014 and 2016.

Doyle made his debut on the inter-county scene at the age of fifteen when he was selected for the Westmeath minor team. He enjoyed four championship seasons with the minor team. Doyle subsequently joined the Westmeath under-21 team. He made his senior debut during the 2016 league.

On 8 September 2022, Doyle was nominated for a PwC All-Star award, Westmeath's first hurling nomination since 1986 when David Kilcoyne won their first and only All-Star.

== Career statistics ==
As of match played 21 May 2022.

Team	Year	National League			Leinster		All-Ireland		Total	
Team	Year	Division	Apps	Score	Apps	Score	Apps	Score	Apps	Score
Westmeath	2016	Division 2A	1	0-01	2	0-03	1	0-00	4	0-04
Westmeath	2017	Division 2A	3	0-04	4	3-07	1	0-02	8	3-13
Westmeath	2018	Division 2A	4	0-11	-		-		4	0-11
Westmeath	2019	Division 2A	6	0-17	-		1	0-09	7	0-26
Westmeath	2020	Division 1A	4	1-28	-		-		4	1-28
Westmeath	2021	Division 1A	3	1-15	-		-		3	1-15
Westmeath	2022	Division 2A	7	2-34	5	0-58	-		12	2-92
Total			28	4-110	11	3-68	3	0-11	42	7-189

== Honours ==
Raharney

- Westmeath Senior Hurling Championship (3): 2014, 2016, 2021

Westmeath

- Joe McDonagh Cup: 2021
