= Alan Mangan =

Westmeath Gaelic footballer and hurler

Personal information
- Nickname: Budda
- Born: 1979 (age 46–47)

Sport
Inter-county
- Years: County
- Westmeath
- Leinster titles: 1

Alan Mangan (born June 1979) is a dual player of Gaelic games, a hurling coach, manager, selector and former Gaelic footballer. He played football and hurling for Westmeath.

== Playing career ==
=== Club ===
Mangan first played hurling for Castletown Geoghegan as a 16-year-old, at which age he played as a goalkeeper in a Westmeath Senior Hurling Championship final. He won three Westmeath SHC medals while playing with his club, the first in 2004, adding another in 2013.

Mangan also played football for the St Malachy's club.

=== Inter-county ===
Mangan played senior inter-county hurling for Westmeath for two years: 1999 and 2000.

His inter-county football debut for Westmeath, limited to substitute appearances, was as part of the team that won the 1999 All-Ireland Under-21 Football Championship and retained the Leinster Under-21 Football Championship the following year, under the management of Luke Dempsey. Then Mangan featured for the county junior team, twice scoring five points from play, with both games against Offaly. Westmeath's junior team manager Ned Moore contacted Dempsey (who had by then been promoted to the position of senior team manager) and convinced him to call Mangan into his panel. Mangan arrived onto the senior panel the following year. Mangan's first senior game for Westmeath was against All-Ireland Senior Football Championship title holder Galway at Cusack Park. He was put into the team in place of established corner-forward Ger Heavin and assigned to mark Tomás Mannion.

Dempsey used Mangan as a substitute against Meath in a draw and then a replay in the 2003 championship before starting him against Monaghan, in what would be Dempsey's last game as manager.

Páidí Ó Sé succeeded Dempsey as manager. Ó Sé left Mangan out for the first 2004 O'Byrne Cup but started him in the second game of the competition, against Kildare. Mangan scored three points against Kildare. He started every game for Westmeath after that (O'Byrne, league and championship) until he injured his knee in 2009.

Mangan was one of those who won the 2004 Leinster Senior Football Championship Final. Ó Sé made a memorable comparison between Mangan and a loaf of bread after Darren Rooney of Laois knocked him over the sideline during the drawn game between the teams. Mangan then scored four points from play in Westmeath's next game.

== Post-playing career ==
Mangan was a selector when Michael Ryan managed the Westmeath hurlers.

He ran unsuccessfully as a candidate for the Labour Party in the Longford–Westmeath constituency at the 2020 Irish general election, with the intention of replacing the retiring Willie Penrose. Mangan was coaxed into running, as Penrose was a family friend, though Mangan's mother advised him against. He cancelled a holiday that he had paid for in New York when the election was suddenly called. Due to his involvement in that election he also refused various coaching and management offers that he received in early 2020.

Mangan then joined the Westmeath senior hurlers in a coaching capacity later in 2020. As of 2022, he was managing the Castletown Geoghegan hurlers.

== Personal life ==
Mangan is married to Corinne and is a father of four. He is from the village of Castletown Geoghegan. He inherited his nickname ("Budda") from his father and is known throughout Westmeath by it. Only Dessie Dolan and the Westmeath hurling manager Michael Ryan ever refer to him as "Alan".
