= Niall O'Brien (hurler) =

Irish hurler

Personal information
- Native name: Niall Ó Briain (Irish)
- Born: 1994 (age 31–32) Ballinagore, County Westmeath, Ireland
- Occupation: Teacher

Sport
- Sport: Hurling
- Position: Right corner-forward
Club
- Years: Club
- 2011–: Castletown Geoghegan
Club titles
- Westmeath titles: 0
Inter-county*
Years	County	Apps (scores)
2012–	Westmeath	34 (7–131)
Inter-county titles
- Leinster titles: 0
- All-Irelands: 0
- NHL: 0
- All Stars: 0
- *Inter County team apps and scores correct as of match played 21 May 2023.

Niall O'Brien (born 1994) is an Irish hurler who plays as a right corner-forward for the Westmeath senior team.

O'Brien made his first appearance for the team during the 2012 championship and immediately became a regular member of the starting fifteen.

At club level O'Brien plays with the Castletown Geoghegan club.

== Career statistics ==
As of match played 21 May 2023

Team	Year	National League			McDonagh Cup		Leinster		All-Ireland		Total	
Team	Year	Division	Apps	Score	Apps	Score	Apps	Score	Apps	Score	Apps	Score
Westmeath	2012	Division 2A	2	1-05	—		2	2-15	1	0-05	5	3-25
Westmeath	2013	Division 2A	4	2-15	—		1	1-00	2	0-00	7	3-15
Westmeath	2014	Division 2A	3	0-04	—		5	0-25	0	0-00	8	0-29
Westmeath	2015	Division 2A	5	1-32	—		3	0-18	1	0-00	9	1-50
Westmeath	2016	Division 1B	3	0-09	—		4	0-32	1	0-11	8	0-52
Westmeath	2017	Division 2A	1	0-02	—		4	0-02	1	0-02	6	0-06
Westmeath	2018	Division 2A	5	0-07	6	3-23	—		1	0-00	12	3-30
Westmeath	2019	Division 2A	—		—		—		—		—	
Westmeath	2020	Division 1A	0	0-00	2	1-04	—		—		2	1-04
Westmeath	2021	Division 1A	3	0-17	0	0-00	—		—		3	0-17
Westmeath	2022	Division 2A	2	0-02	—		5	2-08			7	2-10
Westmeath	2023	Division 1A	4	1-13	—		3	2-13			7	3-26
Total			32	5-106	8	4-27	27	7-113	7	0-18	74	16-264
