= Luke Loughlin =

Westmeath Gaelic footballer

Personal information
- Born: Mullingar, County Westmeath, Ireland

Sport
Club
- Years: Club
- The Downs/Clonkill
Club titles
	Football	Hurling
Westmeath titles	1	3
Inter-county
- Years: County
- Westmeath
- Leinster titles: 1

Luke Loughlin (born 1994/1995) is a dual player of Gaelic games, who plays football for The Downs, hurling for Clonkill and also plays at senior level for the Westmeath county football team. He has also featured for the New York county football team.

== Playing career ==
Loughlin was a playing member of the team when Westmeath won the 2019 National Football League Division 3 league title by a goal against Laois at Croke Park.

He played in the 2024 NFL Division 3 final as Westmeath claimed the title.

He collapsed while playing for Clonkill in the Westmeath SHC in August 2024. He was taken to the Regional Hospital in Mullingar where a CT scan thankfully came back clear.

Against Antrim in the 2025 Tailteann Cup, Loughlin nearly broke Cillian O'Connor's record for the highest individual score in a championship match.

In the middle of the second half of the 2026 Leinster Senior Football Championship Quarter Final against Meath, Loughlin went off injure. He later confirmed that he had torn a hamstring and ruptured a tendon, which required surgery and ended his season. Loughlin had been the team's top scorer. His injury played a part in the return of John Heslin from retirement ahead of the 2026 Leinster Senior Football Championship final. Loughlin had surgery the day before the final, then saw Westmeath off from the team hotel, and also received a medal.

== Personal life ==
Loughlin is from Mullingar.

He has spoken openly about his struggles with addiction.

== Honours ==
The Downs

- Westmeath Senior Football Championship (1): 2022

Clonkill

- Westmeath Senior Hurling Championship (3): 2018–2020

Westmeath

- Tailteann Cup (1): 2022
- Leinster Senior Football Championship (1): 2026
- National Football League Division 3 (1): 2019, 2024
