= Allan Devine =

Irish hurler (born 1988)

Allan Devine (born 1988) is an Irish hurler who plays as a left corner-forward for the Westmeath senior team.
