= Castletown Geoghegan =

Village in County Westmeath, Ireland

Castletown Geoghegan Baile Chaisleáin Mag Eochagán
- Village
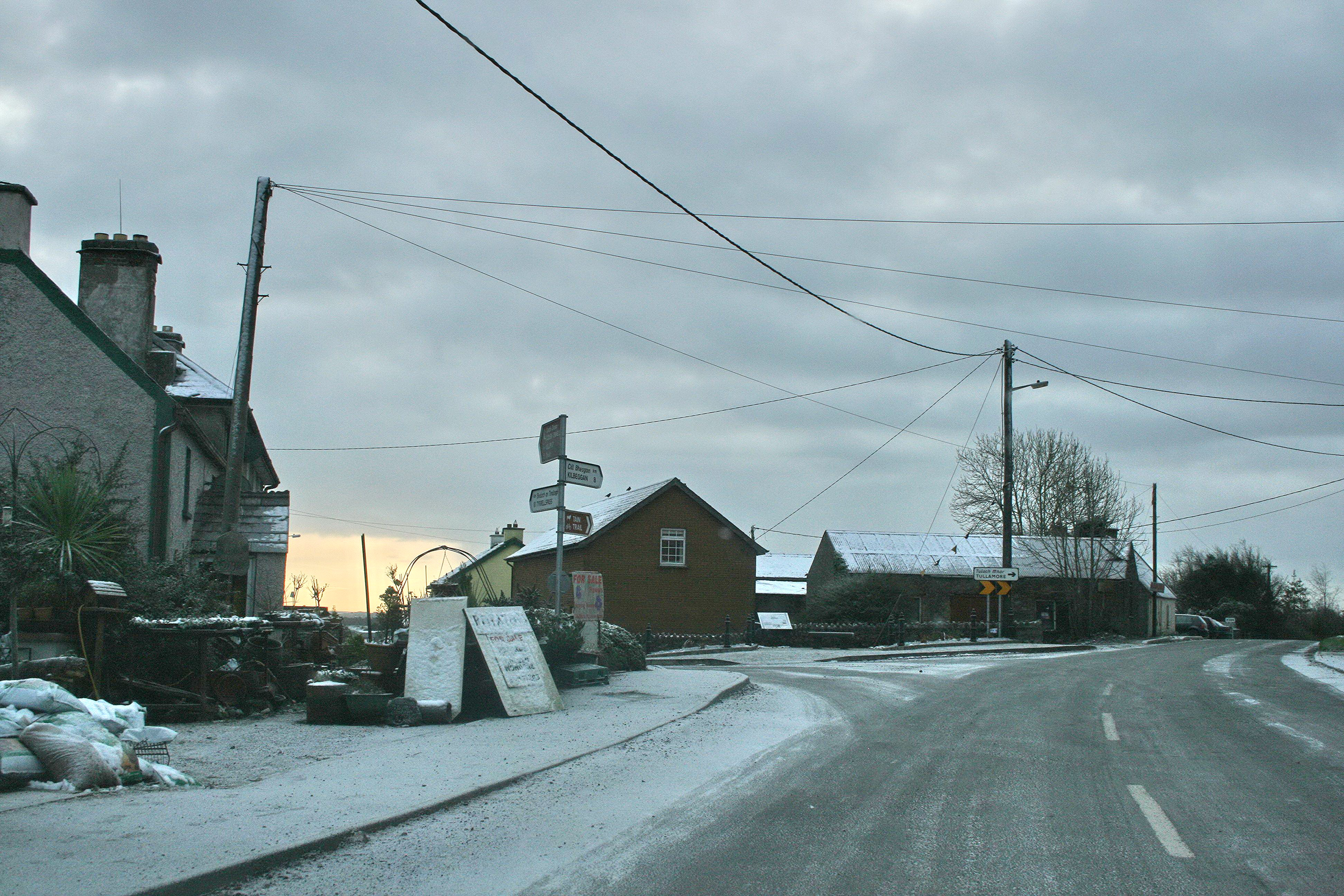
- Castletown in winter

- Location in Ireland
- Coordinates: 53°26′49″N 7°29′20″W
- Country: Ireland
- Province: Leinster
- County: County Westmeath
- Elevation: 95 m (312 ft)

Population (2016)
  - Total: 141
- Time zone: UTC+0 (WET)
  - Summer (DST): UTC-1 (IST (WEST))
- Irish Grid Reference: N337442

Castletown Geoghegan (Irish: Baile Chaisleáin Mag Eochagán) is a village in County Westmeath, Ireland, and lies south west of Lough Ennell near the county town of Mullingar. It is around 13 km south-west of Mullingar and 19 km north of Tullamore. Castletown was the seat of the Geoghegan family of the medieval Barony of Moycashel in County Westmeath.

== History ==
Castletown Geoghegan sign

The Mac Eochagáin family are descended from Fiacha, son of Niall Naoi Noigíallach. Niall is reputed to have captured and enslaved the teenage Magnus Succetus - who later returned to preach Christianity as Patricius - in a raid on the Cumbrian or Welsh coast. The descendants of Niall's son Fiacha (Fiachu Fiachrach) were collectively known as Cenel Fhiachaigh, of the southern Ui Neill (later anglicised as Kenaleagh and Kindalane).

The Geoghegan family were major landholders in south Westmeath and maintained a peaceful co-existence with the Tudor reconquest through a process known as "surrender and regrant". As the reign of the Stuarts led to the English Civil War (1642–1651), and the events of 1641 to the Cromwellian invasion of Ireland, the family suffered losses after the Down Survey and the ensuing plantations. The later War of the Three Kingdoms finalized the confiscation. They lost a considerable portion their estates to Gustavus Lambart (later created Earl of Cavan) through confiscation even prior to the final publication of the Down Survey. Given the area's rich grazing land, the Lambarts of Kilcoursey contrived to procure much of it very early in the process.

In the general political reform, following the Tudor Conquest, the somewhat reduced medieval barony was subject to the "surrender and regrant" process and the adroit Geoghegan family Chief Kedagh complied and was accorded the title of 'Captain' Geoghegan in the reign of Queen Elizabeth I. He resided in the principal Geoghegan castle of the barony which was located in the village at this time.

The Restoration resettlement acts of the late 17th century favoured the retention of land by some of the recently ensconced Cromwellian "adventurers" and "undertakers" and some to their traditional owners. Consequently, some relatively small holdings of the rich grazing lakeland was restored to the Geoghegans. It did not help the case for a greater degree restoration of Geoghegan land that the chieftain Bryan and many of his allies of the "Irish of Meath" coalition refused to sign the mandatory pledges and undertakings of fealty to the new regime of William and Mary, to parliament and to the established church. The Geoghegan leaders, along with many more native landholders, mostly headed for exile and to Connaught (where some of them reverted to their patronymic surname of O'Neill).

The Geoghegan family had led a group of local Gaelic chieftains in a long-term alliance. The 'Irish of Meath' included the O'Melaghlin (McLaughlin), O'Maolmhuidhe (Molloy), Kearney, Fox, Dalton and Brennan families. These native septs all suffered heavy property confiscation after the Confederate / Commonwealth Wars. They are prominent in the Annals of Clonmacnoise, a notable collection of historical records. Many families received offers of "surrender and regrant" deals after the Restoration, but some families rejected the terms. Recalcitrants were reluctant to adhere to the terms of oaths of fealty required. The Annals collection was translated from the original Irish into Elizabethan English by Conall Geoghegan, a 16th-century Franciscan friar.

The Abbé James Mac Geoghegan, born in nearby Uisneach, wrote his celebrated Mac Geoghegan's History of Ireland at Chartres in France in the 18th century. This history became Eamon De Valera's desk companion for his political life.

The surrounding territories were held by the Tyrrells of Fartullagh, the Dillon's of Drumrany (which lay to the west between Moate and Athlone). The Nugents of Delvin, later Lords Delvin and Marquess of Westmeath and the Tuites of Sonagh were to the east.

== Built heritage ==
The local graveyard, in the townland of Castletown, contains gravestones mainly dating from the 18th to the early-20th centuries and is on the site of a ruined medieval churchyard.

Middleton Park House, a country house built c. 1850, is located near Castletown Geoghegan. Also in the area is Mount Druid, an alternative wedding venue.

== Sport ==
Castletown Geoghegan GAA colours

Hurling is one of the most popular sports locally. Castletown Geoghegan GAA club, the local Gaelic Athletic Association club, plays at Páirc Mhic Eochagain (MacGeoghean Park). Hurling was introduced to the village by a Kilkenny railway employee, with the club adopting a black and amber striped kit. The club has won 14 Westmeath Senior Hurling Championship titles. The club's crest depicts the ruins of a castle on the shores of Lough Ennel with a rising sun in the background.

The 1946 Epsom Derby winner, Airborne was bred near the village in 1943.

== People ==
People associated with Castletown Geoghegan include:

- Dermot Farrell, Archbishop of Dublin, born in the town;
- George Boyd-Rochfort, VC, buried in Castletown Old Churchyard;
- Alan Mangan, Gaelic footballer, from Castletown Geoghegan.

== See also ==
- List of towns and villages in Ireland
