= Westmeath Senior Hurling Championship =

Annual hurling competition

- Current season or competition: 2026 Westmeath Senior Hurling Championship
- Irish: Craobh Sinsear Iomána na hIarmhí
- Code: Hurling
- Founded: 1903; 123 years ago
- Region: Westmeath (GAA)
- Trophy: Westmeath Examiner Cup
- No. of teams: 6
- Title holders: Lough Lene Gaels (8th title)
- Most titles: Clonkill (17 titles)
- Sponsors: Slevin Coaches
- TV partner: Iarmhí TV
- Official website: Westmeath GAA

The Westmeath Senior Hurling Championship (known for sponsorship reasons as Slevin Coaches Senior Hurling Championship and abbreviated to the Westmeath SHC) is an annual hurling competition organized by the Westmeath County Board of the Gaelic Athletic Association and contested by the top-ranking senior clubs in the county of Westmeath in Ireland. It is the most prestigious competition in Westmeath hurling.

The winning team is presented with the Westmeath Examiner Cup, originally awarded in 1963 to 'Jobber' McGrath of Rickardstown. The champions also represent Westmeath in the Leinster Senior Club Hurling Championship.

The competition has been won by 19 teams, 14 of which have won it more than once. Clonkill is the most successful team in the championship's history, having won it 17 times. Lough Lene Gaels are the reigning champions, defeating Raharney 1-16 to 0–16 in the 2026 SHC final.

== Format ==
Senior hurling in Westmeath is divided into two separate groups: the Westmeath Senior Hurling Championship (Group A), and the Westmeath Senior B Hurling Championship (Group B), with each team getting at least five games.

The top team in the group stage gets a bye to the final, meeting the winner of the sole semi-final between the second and third placed teams.

The winner of the Group B final is promoted, and play in Group A the following year. The winner of the Group A final are the Senior Hurling champions.

The team finishing lowest in Group A is relegated to Group B for next year. The team finishing lowest in Group B is relegated to the Westmeath Intermediate Hurling Championship for the following season.

In the event of a tie between two teams at the bottom of either group, a play-off is used to determine who is relegated.

== Teams ==
=== 2027 Teams ===
The 6 teams who will compete in the 2027 Westmeath Senior Hurling Championship are:

Club	Location	Position in 2026	Championship titles	Last championship title
Castletown Geoghegan	Castletown Geoghegan	Semi-Final	15	2025
Clonkill	Clonkill	Group Stage	17	2020
Delvin	Delvin	Group Stage	4	1953
Lough Lene Gaels	Collinstown	Champions	8	2026
Raharney	Raharney	Runners-Up	16	2023
St Oliver Plunkett's	Mullingar	Senior B Champions	0	N/A

== Roll of honour ==
=== By club ===
#	Club	Titles	Championship wins
1	Clonkill	17	1929, 1930, 1931, 1932, 1939, 1940, 1941, 1969, 2001, 2007, 2009, 2011, 2012, 2015, 2018, 2019, 2020
2	Castletown Geoghegan	16	1923, 1956, 1957, 1958, 1960, 1964, 1979, 1982, 1986, 1990, 2004, 2013, 2017, 2022, 2024, 2025
3	Raharney	15	1913, 1914, 1919, 1967, 1973, 1984, 1992, 1994, 2006, 2008, 2010, 2014, 2016, 2021, 2023
3	Brownstown	15	1938, 1943, 1946, 1947, 1948, 1952, 1977, 1978, 1981, 1983, 1985, 1988, 1989, 1991, 1993
6	Castlepollard	14	1925, 1928, 1933, 1934, 1936, 1937, 1961, 1965, 1966, 1974, 1995, 1997, 2003, 2005
7	Ringtown	9	1906, 1908, 1910, 1915, 1916, 1917, 1942, 1980, 1987
8	Lough Lene Gaels	8	1975, 1976, 1996, 1998, 1999, 2000, 2002, 2026
9	St Brigid's	4	1968, 1970, 1971, 1972
9	Athlone	4	1905, 1907, 1911, 1912
9	Delvin	4	1949, 1950, 1951, 1953
9	Mullingar	4	1903, 1904, 1935, 1944
13	Rickardstown	3	1954, 1959, 1963
14	Athlone Military	2	1926, 1927
14	Drumraney	2	1918, 1921
16	Riverstown	1	1909
16	Mental Hospital	1	1924
16	Collinstown	1	1955
16	Columb Rovers	1	1945
16	Pearses	1	1962

== List of finals ==
=== Legend ===
- Gold – Leinster intermediate club champions
- Silver – Leinster intermediate club runners-up

Year	Winners		Runners-up	
Year	Club	Score	Club	Score
2026	Lough Lene Gaels	1-16	Raharney	0-16
2025	Castletown Geoghegan	1-23, 3-15 (R)	Lough Lene Gaels	2-20, 2-09
2024	Castletown Geoghegan	1-27	Lough Lene Gaels	2-17
2023	Raharney	2-19	Lough Lene Gaels	2-17
2022	Castletown Geoghegan	0–22	Clonkill	1-14
2021	Raharney	0–21	Castletown Geoghegan	0–18
2020	Clonkill	3–16 (AET)	Castletown Geoghegan	2–16
2019	Clonkill	2–16	Castletown Geoghegan	1–16
2018	Clonkill	1–13	Raharney	2-09
2017	Castletown Geoghegan	1–18	Raharney	1–16
2016	Raharney	2–18	Clonkill	1–13
2015	Clonkill	1–14	Raharney	1–10
2014	Raharney	2–12	Castlepollard	1–09
2013	Castletown Geoghegan	1–12	St Oliver Plunkett's	0–11
2012	Clonkill	2–16	Raharney	2–11
2011	Clonkill	1–13	Castletown Geoghegan	0–14
2010	Raharney	2–14	Clonkill	1–16
2009	Clonkill	1–16	Lough Lene Gaels	2-09
2008	Raharney	0–15	Clonkill	2-06
2007	Clonkill	1–15	Lough Lene Gaels	0–05
2006	Raharney	1–09, 4–05 (R)	Castletown Geoghegan	1–09, 2–05 (R)
2005	Castlepollard	2-09	Lough Lene Gaels	0–04
2004	Castletown Geoghegan	0–13	Lough Lene Gaels	1–09
2003	Castlepollard	1–10	Clonkill	1–09
2002	Lough Lene Gaels	1–08, 4–11 (R)	Castletown Geoghegan	0–11, 2–12 (R)
2001	Clonkill	2–11	Cullion	2–05
2000	Lough Lene Gaels	3-08	Castlepollard	0–14
1999	Lough Lene Gaels	1–13	Castlepollard	1–11
1998	Lough Lene Gaels	1–10	Clonkill	0–09
1997	Castlepollard	2-07, 2–11 (R)	Lough Lene Gaels	0–13, 2–08 (R)
1996	Lough Lene Gaels	2-07	Castletown Geoghegan	0–09
1995	Castlepollard	1–10	Raharney	2–06
1994	Raharney	1–14	Castlepollard	1–10
1993	Brownstown	2-06	Castletown Geoghegan	1–08
1992	Raharney	2-06	Lough Lene Gaels	1–06
1991	Brownstown	4-06	Castlepollard	3-03
1990	Castletown Geoghegan	1–08	Raharney	1–07
1989	Brownstown	2-09	Castletown Geoghegan	2-03
1988	Brownstown	1–11	Raharney	1–09
1987	Ringtown	1–10	Brownstown	1–09
1986	Castletown Geoghegan	1–13	Brownstown	1–08
1985	Brownstown	1–09	Lough Lene Gaels	1–06
1984	Raharney	2–14	Castletown Geoghegan	2–12
1983	Brownstown	2–13	Castlepollard	0–07
1982	Castletown Geoghegan	0–14	Brownstown	1–06
1981	Brownstown	1–13	Raharney	0–05
1980	Ringtown	1–10	Brownstown	0–09
1979	Castletown Geoghegan	0–13	Raharney	2–04
1978	Brownstown	2–16	Castlepollard	1–06
1977	Brownstown	1–19	Castletown Geoghegan	1–09
1976	Lough Lene Gaels	2-07	Raharney	3-03
1975	Lough Lene Gaels	2-09	Raharney	1–05
1974	Castlepollard	1–08	Raharney	1–04
1973	Raharney	2–11	Castlepollard	3-06
1972	St Brigid's	3–10	Castlepollard	1–08
1971	St Brigid's	4-07	Raharney	1–07
1970	St Brigid's	1–08	Castletown Geoghegan	1–07
1969	Clonkill	2–11	Devlin	1–08
1968	St Brigid's	3-06	Castletown Geoghegan	1–06
1967	Raharney	4–12	Pearses	1–08
1966	Castlepollard	2-07	Pearses	2-04
1965	Castlepollard	4-02	Castletown Geoghegan	2-06
1964	Castletown Geoghegan	2–13	Raharney	1–07
1963	Rickardstown	6-05	Castlepollard	0–09
1962	Pearses	2-09	Raharney	3-05
1961	Castlepollard	2-09	St Patrick's	1–04
1960	Castletown Geoghegan	2-06	Castlepollard	0–08
1959	Rickardstown	6-07	Castletown Geoghegan	3-03
1958	Castletown Geoghegan	4-04	Castlepollard	1–02
1957	Castletown Geoghegan	2–10	Collinstown	4-03
1956	Castletown Geoghegan	3-09	Rickardstown	2-03
1955	Collinstown	8-05	Castletown Geoghegan	4-03
1954	Rickardstown	1–12, 3–05 (R)	Collinstown	3–06, 2–07 (R)
1953	Delvin	4–06, 2–06 (R)	Collinstown	5–03, 1–08 (R)
1952	Brownstown	4-05	Rickardstown	3-07
1951	Delvin	4-06	Collinstown	2-08
1950	Delvin	3-03	Collinstown	2-03
1949	Delvin	6-06	Ringtown	5-01
1948	Brownstown	3-03	Collinstown	0-03
1947	Brownstown	3-03	Rickardstown	2-02
1946	Brownstown	5-05	Clonkill	2-03
1945	Columb Rovers	6-04	Ringtown	3-02
1944	Mullingar	7-04	Ringtown	4-01
1943	Brownstown	6-05	Castlepollard	6-04
1942	Ringtown	5-02	Clonkill	1-03
1941	Clonkill	2-07	Brownstown	2-06
1940	Clonkill	2-01	Castlepollard	1-01
1939	Clonkill	5-03	Brownstown	2-00
1938	Brownstown	9-06	Clonkill	0-05
1937	Castlepollard	7-05	Ardnurcher	5-03
1936	Castlepollard	5-02	Clonkill	4-00
1935	Mullingar	3-03	Castletown Geoghegan	3-01
1934	Castlepollard	7-04	Castletown Geoghegan	1–01
1933	Castlepollard	4-04	Clonkill	0–02
1932	Clonkill	2-04	Delvin	1-02
1931	Clonkill	6-05	Castlepollard	3-02
1930	Clonkill	7-03	Castlepollard	3-01
1929	Clonkill	5-05	Ringtown	1-01
1928	Castlepollard	(awarded)	None	
1927	Athlone Military	4-04	Killadoran	2-02
1926	Athlone Military	5-03	Collinstown	0-00
1925	Castlepollard	6-02	Raharney	2-00
1924	Mental Hospital	2-05	Castletown Geoghegan	1–04
1923	Castletown Geoghegan	7-00	Castlepollard	1-00
1922	No Championship			
1921	Drumraney	3-04	Raharney	2-02
1920	No Championship			
1919	Raharney	4-01	Drumraney	3-00
1918	Drumraney	6-02	Raharney	2-02
1917	Ringtown	4-01	Drumraney	3-00
1916	Ringtown	4-06	Drumraney	0-03
1915	Ringtown	4-05	Simonstown	0-00
1914	Raharney Rovers	5-01	Castlepollard	0–00
1913	Raharney Rovers	3-04	Crookedwood	1–00
1912	Athlone	4-00	Ringtown	2-00
1911	Athlone	4-01	Ringtown	3-00
1910	Ringtown	6-02	Riverstown Emmets	3-00
1909	Riverstown Emmets	5-04	Athlone St Ciaran's	2-02
1908	Ringtown	2-05	Riverstown Emmets	2-03
1907	Athlone	2-04	Drumraney	0-01
1906	Ringtown	1-08	Raharney	1-04
1905	Athlone St Ciaran's	7-12 (1st leg) 1-11 (2nd leg)	Mullingar	1-02 (1st leg) 1-05 (2nd leg)
1904	Mullingar	2-02	Ringtown Myles O'Reillys	0–04
1903	Mullingar	3-02	Athlone	2-00

== See also ==
- Westmeath Senior B Hurling Championship
- Westmeath Intermediate Hurling Championship
