= Lough Lene Gaels GAA =

Gaelic games club in County Westmeath, Ireland

Lough Lene Gaels
- Gaeil Loch Léinn
- Founded: 1969
- County: Westmeath
- Nickname: The Gaels
- Colours
- Grounds: Decotek Park
- Coordinates: 53°38′56″N 7°13′30″W

Playing kits
Standard colours

Senior Club Championships
	All Ireland	Leinster champions	Westmeath champions
Hurling:	0	0	8

Lough Lene Gaels (/lɒx ˈliːn ɡeɪlz/, lokh LEEN gails) is a Gaelic Athletic Association club in Collinstown, County Westmeath, Ireland. The club is affiliated to the Westmeath County Board and is solely concerned with the game of hurling.

== History ==
Located in the village of Collinstown, roughly halfway between Delvin and Castlepollard, Lough Lene Gaels GAA Club was founded in 1969, following an amalgamation between the existing Collinstown, Fore, Glenidan and Rickardstown hurling clubs. The new club immediately entered the Westmeath SHC and recorded its first win on 19 July 1970, with a 5–17 to 5–01 first round defeat of Delvin.

Lough Lene Gaels had its first championship success in 1973, when the Westmeath JAHC title was won after a 7–03 to 2–03 win over Castletown Geoghegan in the final. This title success was later followed by consecutive Westmeath SHC titles in 1975 and 1976, after consecutive defeats of Raharney.

20 years elapsed before Lough Lene Gaels claimed their third Westmeath SHC in 1996, a win which began a decade of dominance for the club. Lough Lene Gaels won five Westmeath SHC titles, including three-in-a-row, from six final appearances in seven seasons between 1996 and 2002. The club contested a further four finals without success between 2004 and 2009. Lough Lene Gaels won their eighth Westmeath SHC title in 2026, following a 1–16 to 0–16 win over Raharney in the final.

== Grounds ==
Lough Lene Gaels's home ground is Decotek Park. It is named after Decotek Automotive, an automotive design and manufacturing company based in Mullingar, who provide sponsorship to the club. The official renaming of the grounds took place on 17 May 2024.

== Honours ==
- Westmeath Senior Hurling Championship (8): 1975, 1976, 1996, 1998, 1999, 2000, 2002, 2026
- Westmeath Junior A Hurling Championship (3): 1973, 2005, 2007

== Notable players ==
- Tommy Doyle: Joe McDonagh Cup–winner (2021)
- John McGrath: Railway Cup–winner (1956)
