= Castletown Geoghegan GAA =

Gaelic Athletic Association club in Ireland

Castletown Geoghegan Hurling Club
- Baile Chaisleáin Mhic Eochagáin
- Founded: 1920
- County: Westmeath
- Colours: Black and Amber
- Grounds: Páirc Mhic Eochagain
- Coordinates: 53°26'57.6"N 7°29'03.8"W

Playing kits
Standard colours

Senior Club Championships
	All Ireland	Leinster champions	Westmeath champions
Hurling:	0	0	16

Castletown Geoghegan Hurling Club is a Gaelic Athletic Association club based in Castletown Geoghegan, County Westmeath, Ireland. The club first fielded a championship team in 1920 and is exclusively concerned with the game of hurling.

In senior hurling, Castletown Geoghegan Hurling club competes annually in the Westmeath Senior Hurling Championship, which they have won sixteen times as of 2026. The club also fields adult teams at the intermediate and junior levels. They also field teams at all underage groups.

== History ==
=== Beginnings ===
The first recorded hurling games in Castletown Geoghegan dates back to 1911 when games were played in Loughlum. These were not on an organized basis, but soon after a Kilkenny man named Mick Byrne who worked with CIÉ at Castletown Station brought his skill and knowledge of hurling to the area. In 1920 the first team entered the junior championship. Since Byrne was a Kilkenny man, the chosen team colours were black and amber. At this stage hurling had moved nearer to Castletown and the game was played in a field called the Planting.

Emigration was rife in the 1920s and as a result at the annual; general meeting of 1924 it was decided to disband the club. Joe Clarke, Pat Corcoran and Dan Leavy re-organized the club in 1930 and from that day to this the club has had unbroken service in the county championships.

As of 2022, Alan Mangan was managing the club's senior hurlers.

== Hurling Titles ==
- Westmeath Senior Hurling Championship (16): 1923, 1956, 1957, 1958, 1960, 1964, 1979, 1982, 1986, 1990, 2004, 2013, 2017, 2022, 2024, 2025
- Westmeath Intermediate Hurling Championship (1): 2023
- Westmeath Junior A Hurling Championship (8): 1921, 1933, 1940, 1944, 1952, 1953, 1969, 2022
- Westmeath Junior B Hurling Championship (2): 1996, 2021
- Westmeath Under-21 Hurling Championship (13): 1970, 1971, 1973, 1974, 1975, 1980, 1991, 1996, 2005, 2006, 2013, 2014, 2015
- Westmeath Minor Hurling Championship (14): 1968, 2002, 2003, 2004, 2006, 2009, 2010, 2011, 2012, 2014, 2016, 2020, 2021, 2022

All Ireland u14 féile nGael (3): 2007, 2010, 2018
