= Raharney GAA =

Gaelic games club in County Westmeath, Ireland

Raharney
- Rath Áirne
- Founded: 1904
- County: Westmeath
- Colours: Blue and white
- Grounds: Joristown
- Coordinates: 53°31′12″N 7°07′16″W

Playing kits
Standard colours

Senior Club Championships
	All Ireland	Leinster champions	Westmeath champions
Hurling:	-	-	15

Raharney GAA is a Gaelic Athletic Association club located in the village of Raharney in County Westmeath, Ireland. The club is almost exclusively concerned with the game of hurling.

== History ==
Raharney GAA club, which was founded in 1904, is one of Westmeath's most successful hurling clubs. Teams representing the club have won the Westmeath Senior Hurling Championship on 15 occasions. The club won its 15th title in the 2023 Westmeath Senior Hurling Championship. Raharney has also won two Westmeath Intermediate Hurling Championship titles.

In late-July 2024, a helicopter crashed between Killucan and Raharney near the R156 road. The club, located nearby, cancelled all hurling training sessions scheduled for the day of the crash.

== Honours ==
- Westmeath Senior Hurling Championship (15): 1913, 1914, 1919, 1967, 1973, 1984, 1992, 1994, 2006, 2008, 2010, 2014, 2016, 2021, 2023
- Westmeath Intermediate Hurling Championship (2): 1987, 1988
