= Clonkill GAA =

Hurling club in County Westmeath, Ireland

Clonkill
- Cluainn Cille
- Founded: 1917
- County: Westmeath
- Colours: Yellow and Green

Playing kits
Standard colours

Senior Club Championships
	All Ireland	Leinster champions	Westmeath champions
Hurling:	1	1	17
Camogie:	-	-	2

Clonkill GAA is a Gaelic Athletic Association club located in Clonkill, County Westmeath, Ireland. The club is exclusively concerned with hurling and camogie. The club competes in Westmeath GAA competitions.

The name "Clonkill" is translated from the Irish "Cluain Cille", meaning "church in the meadow" as is depicted in the club crest.

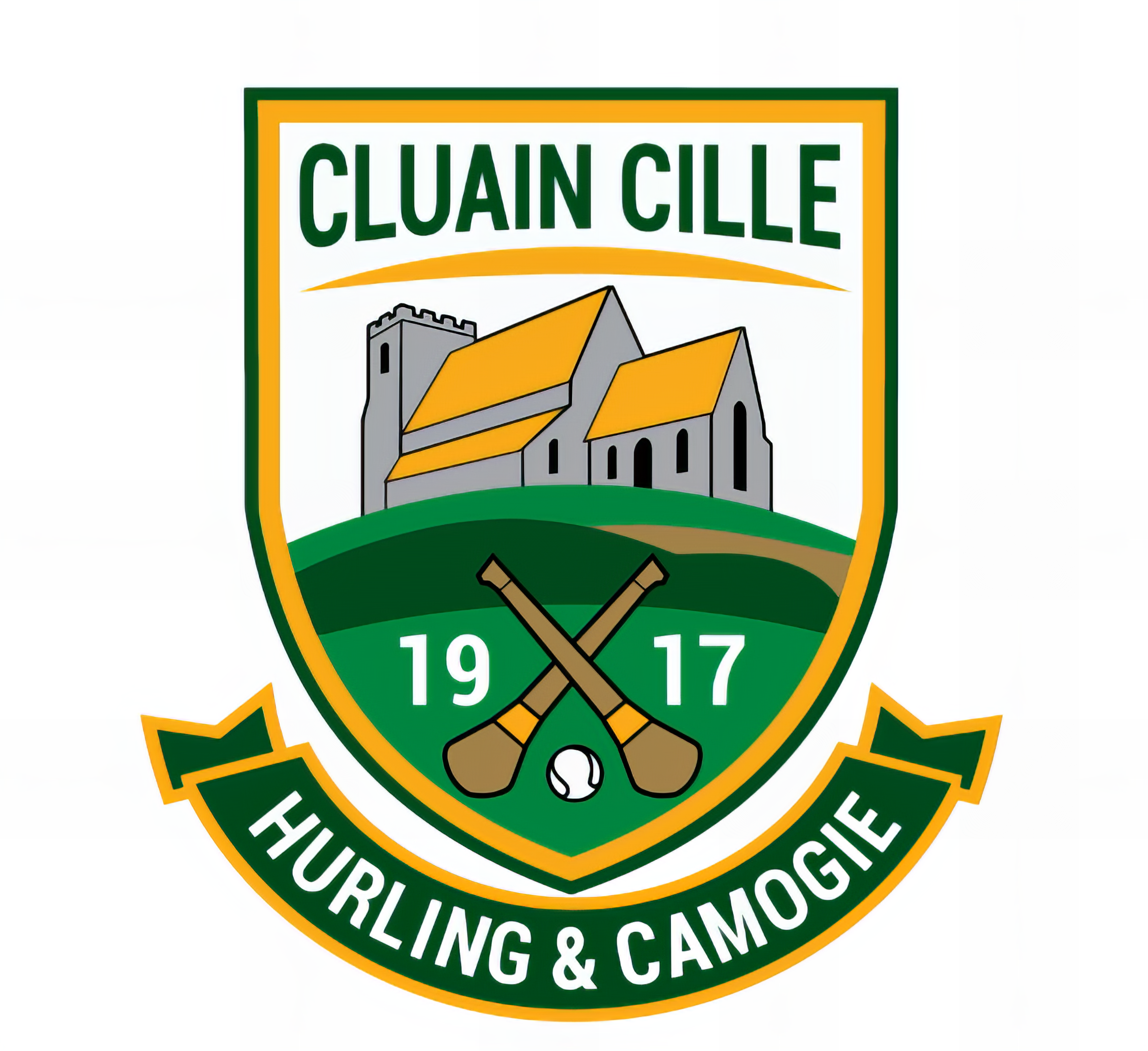

== Achievements ==
- Westmeath Senior Hurling Championship: 1929, 1930, 1931, 1932, 1939, 1940, 1941, 1969, 2001, 2007, 2009, 2011, 2012, 2015 2018, 2019, 2020
- Leinster Intermediate Club Hurling Championship: 2007
- All-Ireland Intermediate Club Hurling Championship: 2008
- Westmeath Senior Camogie Championship: 2025, 2026

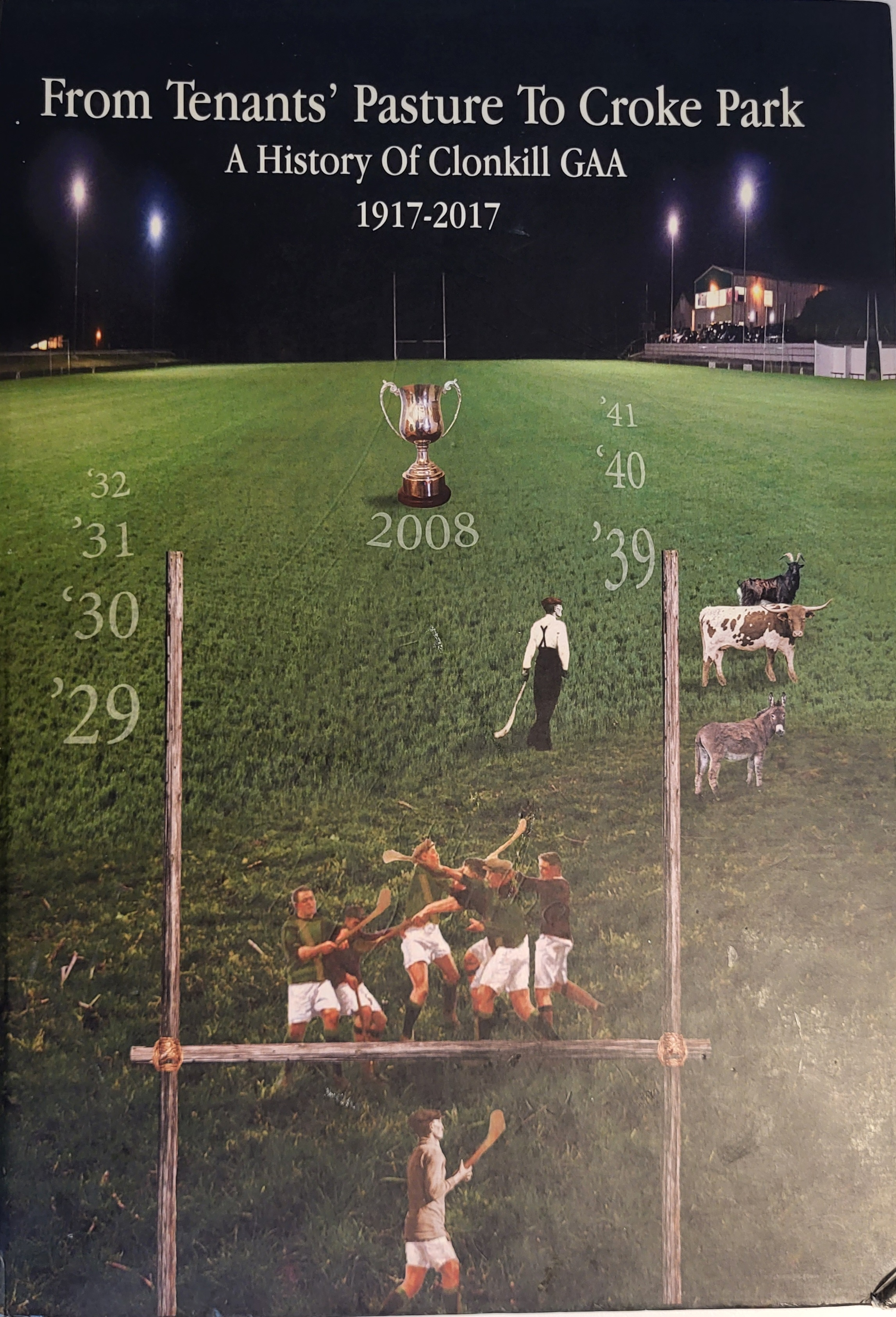

== Notable players ==
- Paddy Dowdall
- Luke Loughlin
- Brendan Murtagh
- Eoin Price
- Niall Mitchell
- Andrew Mitchell
