= Castlepollard GAA =

Gaelic games club in County Westmeath, Ireland

Castlepollard Hurling Club
- Baile na gCros
- County: Westmeath
- Nickname: 'Pollard
- Colours: Blue and Gold
- Grounds: Castlepollard

Playing kits
Standard colours

Senior Club Championships
	All Ireland	Leinster champions	Westmeath champions
Hurling:	0	0	14

Castlepollard Hurling Club is a Gaelic Athletic Association club located in Castlepollard, County Westmeath, Ireland. The club is exclusively concerned with the game of hurling and has a rich history in the game

== Honours ==
- Westmeath Senior Hurling Championship (14): 1925,1928, 1933, 1934, 1936, 1937, 1961, 1965, 1966, 1974, 1995, 1997, 2003, 2005
- Westmeath Intermediate Hurling Championship (1): 2007
