= 2025 Westmeath Senior B Hurling Championship =

- Dates: Jul 19 - Oct 21 2025
- Teams: 6
- Sponsor: Slevin's Coaches
- Champions: Delvin (1st title)
- Runners-up: St Oliver Plunkett's
- Relegated: Cullion

Tournament statistics
- Matches played: 18
- Goals scored: 48 (2.67 per match)
- Points scored: 706 (39.22 per match)

The 2025 Westmeath B Senior Hurling Championship was the sixth staging of the Westmeath Senior B Hurling Championship.

A total of six teams contested the Westmeath Senior B Hurling Championship. All six teams enter the round-robin stage, playing each other once, guaranteeing at least five championship games.

All six teams entered the round-robin stage, playing each other once, guaranteeing at least five championship games. The first round draws of games were streamed live via YouTube on April 3, with the full schedule released via Facebook.

Brownstown were promoted back to Senior B after winning the intermediate final, replacing relegated Castletown Geoghegan

2023 winners St Oliver Plunkett's returns after relegation from the 2024 Westmeath Senior Hurling Championship. They replace Fr Daltons, who bounced straight back in last year's final.

Crookedwood, Cullion, Delvin, and Ringtown round out the field.

The final was contested between St Oliver Plunkett's and Delvin in Mullingar. Delvin won the contest 1-25 - 0-23 in a replay to win their first title, and promoted back to Senior after a long absence.

== Group stage ==
Advance to final Advance to semi-finals Relegated to Intermediate

Team	Matches				Score			Pts
Team	Pld	W	D	L	For	Against	Diff	Pts
St Oliver Plunkett's	5	4	0	1	96	94	2	8
Delvin	5	4	0	1	115	76	24	8
Ringtown	5	3	0	2	114	111	3	6
Crookedwood	5	2	0	3	99	105	-6	4
Brownstown	5	2	0	3	94	97	-3	4
Cullion	5	0	0	5	89	108	-19	0

=== Fixtures ===
Jul 19 Round 1	Cullion	2-10 - 4-11	Delvin	TEG Cusack Park
	Jack Gillen (2-7), Shane Broughan (0-1), Caelum Faughnan (0-1), Conor Kelly (0-1)	Report	Dean Ennis (2-4), Patrick Clune (1-1), Josh Coll (1-0), Killian Murphy (0-3), Alan Fox (0-1), Aaron Fenlon (0-1), Ciaran Fenton (0-1)	Referee: Jimmy Greville

Jul 19 Round 1	St Oliver Plunkett's	0-20 - 2-13	Crookedwood	The Downs GAA
	Davy Gavin (0-6), Aaron Craig (0-5), Matthew Cunningham (0-4), Conor Bracken (0-1), Cathal Craig (0-1), Ross Corroon (0-1), Andrew Cunningham (0-1), Thomas Meehan (0-1)	Report	Barry O’Mara (0-8), Adam Bate (1-0), Kevin Orme (1-0), Ronan Scally (0-2), Noel Yourell (0-2), Seamus Savage (0-1)	Referee: Mick Murtagh

Jul 19 Round 1	Brownstown	0-18 - 1-19	Ringtown	TEG Cusack Park
	Niall Leonard (0-11), Conor Rice (0-2), Tiernan Purcell (0-2), Anthony Mulvaney (0-1), Jamie Fitzsimons (0-1), Jamie Reilly (0-1)	Report	Emmet Corrigan (0-9), Darren Kilcoyne (1-2), Mark Cunningham (0-3), Sean Boylan (0-1), Callum Boyle (0-1), Jphnny Hardman (0-1), Paul Nangle (0-1), Luke Moore (0-1)	Referee: Barry Nea

Aug 2 Round 2	Crookedwood	2-14 - 1-16	Cullion	Robinstown
	Lorcan O'Mara (0-4), Barry O'Mara (1-1), Michael Davitt (0-3), Shane McGovern (0-2), Kevin Orme (0-2), Simon McCarthy (0-1), Brian McLoughlin (0-1)	Report	Jack Gillen (1-7), Kevin Regan (0-6), Conor Regan (0-2), Jamie Kindregan (0-1)	Referee: Jimmy Greville

Aug 3 Round 2	Ringtown	1-15 - 1-18	St Oliver Plunkett's	TEG Cusack Park
	Emmet Corrigan (0-9), Mark Cunningham (0-4), Luke Moore (1-0), James Boylan (0-1), Ciaran Moran (0-1)	Report	Matthew Cunningham (0-8), Conor Bracken (1-2), Andrew Cunningham (0-3), Davy Gavin (0-3), Aaron Craig (0-1), Colm O'Leary (0-1)	Referee: Barry Nea

Aug 3 Round 2	Delvin	1-19 - 1-16	Brownstown	Killucan GAA
	Dean Ennis (0-11), Eoin Carolan (1-0), Josh Coll (0-3), Killian Murphy (0-2), Alan Cox (0-1), Ciaran Fenlon (0-1), Paddy Kelly (0-1)		Niall Leonard (0-7), Shaun Smith (1-1), Jamie Fitzsimons (0-3), Emmett Cuneen (0-1),Keiran Daly (0-1), Patrick O'Reilly (0-1), Conor Rice (0-1), Conor Shaw (0-1)	Referee: Alfie Devine

Aug 16 Round 3	Crookedwood	0-18 - 1-16	Delvin	TEG Cusack Park
	Barry O’Mara 0-11, Shane McGovern (0-2), Shane Savage (0-2), Kevin Orme (0-1), Lorcan O’Mara (0-1), Ronan Scally (0-1)	Report	Dean Ennis (0-9), Patrick Clune (1-2), Josh Coll (0-2), Killian Murphy (0-2), Ross Gaffney (0-1)	Referee: Alfie Devine

Aug 16 Round 3	Ringtown	2-16 - 0-14	Cullion	The Downs GAA
	Emmet Corrigan (0-8), Johnny Hardman (1-0), Darren Kilcoyne (1-0) Mark Cunningham (0-2), Ryan McCauley (0-2), Paul Nangle (0-1), Luke Moore (0-1), Jason Moran (0-1)	Report	Jack Gillen (0-7), Kevin Regan (0-4), Shane Broughan (0-2), Conor Regan (0-1)	Referee: Jimmy Greville

Aug 16 Round 3	St Oliver Plunkett's	2-8 - 1-13	Brownstown	The Downs GAA
	Matthew Cunningham (0-6), Conor Bracken (1-1), Andrew Cunningham (1-0), Colm O’Leary (0-1)	Report	Niall Leonard (0-8), Emmett Cunneen (1-0), Tiernan Purcell (0-2), Jamie Reilly (0-1), Conor Rice (0-1), Conor Shaw (0-1)	Referee: Mick Murtagh

Aug 30 Round 4	Cullion	1-17 - 1-20	St Oliver Plunkett's	TEG Cusack Park
	Davy Gavin (0-9), Thomas Meehan (1-0), Mark Cunningham (0-3), Nathan Cornally, Donnacha Maguire (0-2), Ross Corroon (0-1), John Fry (0-1), Colm O'Leary (0-1)		Jack Gillen (0-8), Kevin Regan (0-6), Conor Regan (1-2), Jamie Kindregen (0-1)	Referee: Alfie Devine

Aug 30 Round 4	Delvin	4-24 - 4-11	Ringtown	Killucan GAA
	Dean Ennis (2-12), Ciaran Fenlon (1-2), Ross Gaffney (1-1), Killian Murphy (0-3), Aarin Fenlon (0-2), Josh Coll (0-1), Eoin Carolan (0-1)		Emmet Corrigan (1-3), Luke Moore (1-1), Jason Moran (1-0), Mark Cunningham (1-0), Darren Kilcoyne (0-2), Paul Nangle (0-2), James Boylan (0-1), Johnny Hardman (0-1), Sean Boylan (0-1)	Referee: Mick Murtagh

Aug 30 Round 4	Brownstown	2-12 - 1-17	Crookedwood	TEG Cusack Park
	Robert Dugdale (1-2), Brian Guerin (1-0), Niall Leonard (0-3), Tiernan Purcell (0-2), Jamie Fitzsimons (0-1), Phillip Gilsenan (0-1), Conor Rice (0-1), Conor Shaw (0-1)		Barry O'Mara (0-7), Brian McLoughlin (0-4) Keelan Varley (1-0), Ronan Scally (0-2), Adam Bate (0-1), Sean Brennan (0-1), Noel Yourell (0-1)	Referee: Barry Kelly

Sep 14 Round 5	Brownstown	0-23 - 1-17	Cullion	Kinnegad
				Referee: Jimmy Greville

Sep 14 Round 5	Ringtown	1-26 - 2-16	Crookedwood	TBC
				Referee: James McGrath

Sep 14 Round 5	St Oliver Plunkett's	0-18 - 1-12	Delvin	TEG Cusack Park
				Referee: Alfie Devine

== Knockout stage ==
Semifinals
2	Delvin	1-20
3	Ringtown	2-11

Final
1	St Oliver Plunkett's	3-15, 0-23 (AET)
2	Delvin	1-21, 1-25 (AET)

=== Fixtures ===
Oct 5 Semi-Final	Delvin	1-20 - 2-11	Ringtown	TEG Cusack Park
				Referee: Barry Nea

Oct 18 Final	St Oliver Plunkett's	3-15 - 1-21	Delvin	TEG Cusack Park
				Referee: Jimmy Greville

Oct 21 Replay	St Oliver Plunkett's	0-23 - 1-25	Delvin	Lakepoint Park
				Referee: Mick Murtagh

== Top scorers ==
Overall

Rank	Player	Club	Tally	Total	Games	Average
1	Dean Ennis	Delvin	3-36	45	4	11.25
2	Jack Gillen	Cullion	3-29	38	4	9.5
3	Barry O'Mara	Crookedwood	2-27	33	4	8.25
4	Niall Leonard	Brownstown	0-29	29	4	7.25
5	Matthew Cunningham	St Oliver Plunkett's	0-21	21	4	5.25
