= 2024 Westmeath Senior B Hurling Championship =

- Dates: July 13 - October 26
- Teams: 6
- Sponsor: Slevin's Coaches
- Champions: Fr Daltons (2nd title); Eoin Ryan (captain); Eamonn Gallagher (manager)
- Runners-up: Delvin
- Promoted: Fr Daltons
- Relegated: Castletown Geoghegan

Tournament statistics
- Matches played: 17
- Goals scored: 47 (2.76 per match)
- Points scored: 681 (40.06 per match)

The 2024 Westmeath Senior B Hurling Championship was the fifth staging of the Westmeath Senior B Hurling Championship since its establishment by the Westmeath County Board in 2020.

The first round draws of games were streamed live via YouTube on April 4, while the full schedule was released via Twitter on June 17.

A total of six teams contested the Westmeath Senior B Hurling Championship. Castletown Geoghegan were promoted as 2023 Westmeath Intermediate Hurling Championship winners. replacing relegated Brownstown.

Relegated Fr Daltons replaced St Oliver Plunkett's, who were promoted as Senior B champions last year. Cullion, Crookedwood, Delvin, and Ringtown round out the field.

Castletown Geoghegan were relegated back to the Westmeath Intermediate Hurling Championship after losing all their games.

The final was played on October 26 at TEG Cusack Park in Mullingar between Delvin and the Fr Daltons. Fr Daltons won the contest 3–12 to 3-11 for their second title overall, and promoted straight back to the Westmeath Senior Hurling Championship for next year.

== Results ==
=== Group stage ===
Advance to final Advance to semi-finals Relegation to Intermediate

Team	Matches				Score			Pts
Team	Pld	W	D	L	For	Against	Diff	Pts
Delvin	5	4	0	1	126	118	8	8
Fr Daltons	5	4	0	1	111	75	36	8
Ringtown	5	2	2	1	102	103	-1	6
Crookedwood	5	2	1	2	80	93	-13	5
Cullion	5	1	1	3	107	108	-1	3
Castletown Geoghegan	5	0	0	5	92	121	-29	0

==== Fixtures ====
Jul 13 Round 1	Delvin	4-14 - 1-19	Cullion	TEG Cusack Park
				Referee: Alfie Devine

Jul 13 Round 1	Crookedwood	0-6 - 3-12	Fr Daltons	Fr. Eamon O'Brien Park
				Referee: Barry Nea

Jul 14 Round 1	Castletown Geoghegan	2-11 - 1-20	Ringtown	TEG Cusack Park
				Referee: Bernard Heaney

Aug 3 Round 2	Fr Daltons	1-18 - 0-12	Castletown Geoghegan	TEG Cusack Park
				Referee: Bernard Heaney

Aug 3 Round 2	Cullion	0-18 - 1-16	Crookedwood	Clonkill
				Referee: Barry Nea

Aug 3 Round 2	Ringtown	1-27 - 4-14	Delvin	Collinstown
				Referee: Jimmy Greville

Aug 16 Round 3	Ringtown	1-18 - 2-15	Cullion	Joristown Park
				Referee: Jimmy Greville

Aug 17 Round 3	Fr Daltons	2-14 - 3-15	Delvin	TEG Cusack Park
				Referee: Barry Kelly

Aug 17 Round 3	Castletown Geoghegan	2-13 - 1-18	Crookedwood	Clonkill
				Referee: Bernard Heaney

Aug 31 Round 4	Cullion	2-12 - 3-14	Fr Daltons	TEG Cusack Park
				Referee: Bernard Heaney

Aug 31 Round 4	Crookedwood	0-13 - 0-13	Ringtown	Ballynacargy
				Referee: Jimmy Greville

Aug 31 Round 4	Delvin	2-22 - 4-13	Castletown Geoghegan	Ballynacargy
				Referee: Kenneth Gunning

Sep 22 Round 5	Fr Daltons	5-11 - 0-15	Ringtown	TEG Cusask Park
				Referee: Caymon Flynn

Sep 22 Round 5	Castletown Geoghegan	1-17 - 3-19	Cullion	Killucan GAA
				Referee: Kenneth Gunning

Round 5	Crookedwood	2-15 - 1-19	Delvin	Rochfortbridge
				Referee: Jimmy Greville

=== Knockout stage ===
Semifinals
2	Fr Daltons	0-17
3	Ringtown	0-11

Final
1	Delvin	3-11
2	Fr Daltons	3-12

==== Fixtures ====
Oct 12 Semi-Final	Fr Daltons	0-17 - 0-11	Ringtown	The Downs
				Referee: Jimmy Greville

Oct 26 Final	Delvin	3-11 - 3-12	Fr Daltons	TEG Cusack Park
		Report		Referee: Matt Shaw
