= 2025 Westmeath Intermediate Hurling Championship =

- Dates: Jul 19 - Oct 19 2025
- Teams: 6
- Sponsor: Slevin's Coaches
- Champions: St Brigid's (6th title)
- Runners-up: Turin

Tournament statistics
- Matches played: 18
- Goals scored: 52 (2.89 per match)
- Points scored: 711 (39.5 per match)

The 2025 Westmeath Intermediate Hurling Championship was the thirty-sixth staging of the Westmeath Intermediate Hurling Championship since its current establishment by the Westmeath County Board in 1985.

The first round draws of games were streamed live via YouTube on April 3, with the full schedule released via Facebook.

A total of six teams contest the Westmeath Intermediate Hurling Championship. Castletown Geoghegan return after being relegated from last year's Senior B championship, replacing Brownstown, who were promoted as last year's champions.

Clonkill, Raharney, Southern Gaels, St Brigid's, and Turin round out the field.

St Brigid's won the championship, defeating Turin 2-17 - 0-18 in Cusack Park for their sixth overall title, and promotion to Senior B for next year.

== Results ==
=== Group stage ===
Advance to Semi-Finals

Team	Matches				Score			Pts
Team	Pld	W	D	L	For	Against	Diff	Pts
Turin	5	5	0	0	122	74	48	10
Castletown Geoghegan	5	3	0	2	99	95	4	6
St Brigid's	5	2	0	3	98	104	-6	4
Southern Gaels	5	2	0	3	115	99	16	4
Raharney	5	2	0	3	87	107	-20	4
Clonkill	5	1	0	4	83	138	-55	2

==== Fixtures ====
Jul 19 Round 1	Castletown Geoghegan	3-13 - 2-13	Clonkill	Ballymore GAA
		Report		Referee: Alfie Devine

Jul 19 Round 1	St Brigid's	1-18 - 1-15	Southern Gaels	The Downs GAA
				Referee: Rob Cornally

Jul 19 Round 1	Raharney	0-15 - 2-14	Turin	TBC
		Report		Referee: Bernard Heaney

Aug 1 Round 2	Clonkill	0-13 - 0-17	Raharney	Collinstown
				Referee: Robert Dillon

Aug 1 Round 2	Southern Gaels	1-19 - 1-20	Castletown Geoghegan	Shandonagh GAA
		Report		Referee: Kenneth Gunning

Aug 2 Round 2	Turin	2-18 - 0-7	St Brigid's	TEG Cusack Park
				Referee: Rob Cornally

Aug 18 Round 3	Clonkill	5-08 - 4-24	Turin	Kinnegad
				Referee: Rob Cornally

Aug 18 Round 3	Southern Gaels	1-17 - 2-20	Raharney	Rochfortbridge
				Referee: Eoin Cawley

Aug 18 Round 3	Castletown Geoghegan	1-16 - 0-20	St Brigid's	Castletown Geoghegan
				Referee: Sean Caroll

Aug 29 Round 4	Raharney	1-10 - 3-14	Castletown Geoghegan	Clonkill GAA
				Referee: Rob Cornally

Aug 30 Round 4	St Brigid's	1-19 - 3-15	Clonkill	The Downs GAA
				Referee: Bernard Heaney

Aug 30 Round 4	Southern Gaels	1-14 - 2-15	Turin	The Downs GAA
				Referee: Raymond Farrelly

Sep 13 Round 5	Southern Gaels	3-26 - 0-11	Clonkill	TEG Cusack Park
				Referee: Rob Cornally

Sep 13 Round 5	St Brigid's	5-16 - 1-13	Raharney	Shandonagh GAA
				Referee: Robert Dillon

Sep 13 Round 5	Castletown Geoghegan	1-18 - 1-09	Turin	TEG Cusack Park
				Referee: Raymond Farrelly

=== Knockout stage ===
==== Fixtures ====
Oct 4 Semi-Final	Turin	1-13 - 0-15	Southern Gaels	Collinstown
				Referee: Kenneth Gunning

Oct 4 Semi-Final	Castletown Geoghegan	0-13 - 0-18	St Brigid's	Ringtown GAA
				Referee: Jimmy Greville

Oct 19 Final	Turin	1-15 - 2-14	St Brigid's	TEG Cusack Park
				Referee: Bernard Heaney
