= 2023 Westmeath Senior B Hurling Championship =

- Dates: June 30 - October 7, 2023
- Teams: 6
- Sponsor: Slevin's Coaches
- Champions: St Oliver Plunkett's (1st title); David Gavin (captain); Ciaran McKenn (manager)
- Runners-up: Ringtown
- Promoted: St Oliver Plunkett's
- Relegated: Brownstown

Tournament statistics
- Matches played: 18
- Goals scored: 44 (2.44 per match)
- Points scored: 657 (36.5 per match)

The 2023 Westmeath Senior B Hurling Championship was the fourth staging of the Westmeath Senior B Hurling Championship since its establishment by the Westmeath County Board in 2020.

A total of six teams contest the Westmeath Senior B Hurling Championship. Brownstown were promoted as 2022 Westmeath Intermediate Hurling Championship winners, replacing relegated St Brigid's last year.

Relegated Cullion replaces Fr Daltons, who were promoted as Senior B champions last year. Crookedwood, Delvin, Ringtown, and St Oliver Plunkett's round out the field.

Brownstown were relegated back to the Westmeath Intermediate Hurling Championship for 2024, following a play-off defeat to Delvin.

The final was played on October 7, at TEG Cusack Park between St Oliver Plunkett's and Ringtown. St Oliver Plunkett's defeated Ringtown to win the Mickey Power Cup for the first time, and promotion to Senior 'A' for 2024.

== Results ==
=== Group stage ===
Advance to final Advance to semi-finals Relegation Playoff

| Team | Matches | | | | Score | | | Pts |
| Team | Pld | W | D | L | For | Against | Diff | Pts |
|---|---|---|---|---|---|---|---|---|
| St Oliver Plunkett's | 5 | 3 | 2 | 0 | 104 | 86 | 18 | 8 |
| Crookedwood | 5 | 4 | 0 | 1 | 81 | 72 | 9 | 8 |
| Ringtown | 5 | 3 | 1 | 1 | 97 | 82 | 15 | 7 |
| Cullion | 5 | 1 | 1 | 3 | 90 | 99 | -9 | 3 |
| Delvin | 5 | 1 | 0 | 4 | 87 | 91 | -4 | 2 |
| Brownstown | 5 | 1 | 0 | 4 | 76 | 108 | -32 | 2 |

==== Fixtures ====
| June 30 Round 1 | Delvin | 0-12 - 1-13 | Brownstown | Joristown Park |
| | | | | Referee: Matt Shaw |

| July 1 Round 1 | St Oliver Plunkett's | 0-18 - 0-16 | Crookedwood | Clonkill GAA |
| | | | | Referee: Jimmy Greville |

| July 2 Round 1 | Ringtown | 1-15 - 0-11 | Cullion | TEG Cusack Park |
| | | | | Referee: James McGrath |

| July 15 Round 2 | Crookedwood | 0-16 - 0-12 | Delvin | TEG Cusack Park |
| | | | | Referee: Kenneth Gunning |

| July 16 Round 2 | Cullion | 1-18 - 3-12 | St Oliver Plunkett's | Clonkill GAA |
| | | | | Referee: Derek Heffernan |

| July 16 Round 2 | Brownstown | 1-12 - 2-19 | Ringtown | Killucan GAA |
| | | | | Referee: Jimmy Greville |

| July 29 Round 3 | Brownstown | 2-9 - 1-13 | Crookedwood | The Downs GAA |
| | | | | Referee: John Dermody |

| July 29 Round 3 | Ringtown | 1-15 - 2-12 | St Oliver Plunkett's | The Downs GAA |
| | | | | Referee: Bernard Heaney |

| July 29 Round 3 | Delvin | 2-20 - 1-14 | Cullion | Killucan GAA |
| | | | | Referee: Jimmy Greville |

| August 19 Round 4 | Crookedwood | 1-15 - 1-12 | Ringtown | TEG Cusack Park |
| | | | | Referee: Alfie Devine |

| August 19 Round 4 | Cullion | 5-14 - 2-13 | Brownstown | Killucan GAA |
| | | | | Referee: Jimmy Greville |

| August 19 Round 4 | St Oliver Plunkett's | 2-15 - 1-14 | Delvin | Killucan GAA |
| | | | | Referee: John Dermody |

| Sept 10 Round 5 | Brownstown | 0-14 - 3-17 | St Oliver Plunkett's | TEG Cusack Park |
| | | | | Referee: Barry Nea |

| Sept 10 Round 5 | Delvin | 1-17 - 2-15 | Ringtown | Lakepoint Park |
| | | | | Referee: Jimmy Greville |

| Sept 10 Round 5 | Crookedwood | 0-15 - 0-12 | Cullion | Rochfortbridge |
| | | | | Referee: Matt Shaw |

=== Relegation Playoff ===
Final
Delvin | 1-23
Brownstown | 2-19

==== Fixtures ====
| October 8 Final | Delvin | 1-23 - 2-19 | Brownstown | TEG Cusack Park |
| | | | | Referee: Barry Kelly |

=== Knockout stage ===
Semifinals
2 | Ringtown | 3-20
3 | Crookedwood | 0-8

Final
1 | St Oliver Plunkett's | 2-21
3 | Ringtown | 0-10

==== Fixtures ====
| September 24 Semi-Final | Ringtown | 3-20 - 0-8 | Crookedwood | TEG Cusack Park |
| | | | | Referee: ??? |

| October 7 Final | St Oliver Plunkett's | 2-21 - 0-10 | Ringtown | TEG Cusack Park |
