= 2017 Westmeath Senior Hurling Championship =

Annual hurling competition season

- Dates: 4 July - 1 October 2017
- Teams: 9
- Sponsor: Slevin's Coaches
- Champions: Castletown Geoghegan (13th title); Liam Varley (captain); Éamonn Gallagher (manager)
- Runners-up: Raharney; Paul Greville (captain); Nicky Weir (manager)

The 2017 Westmeath Senior Hurling Championship was the 113th of the Westmeath Senior Hurling Championship since its establishment by the Westmeath County Board in 1903.

Raharney entered the championship as the defending champions.

The final was played on 1 October 2017 at TEG Cusack Park in Mullingar, between Castletown Geoghegan and Raharney, in what was their sixth meeting in the final overall and a first meeting in the final in 11 years. Castletown Geoghegan won the match by 1–18 to 1–16 to claim their 13th championship title overall and a first title in four years.

== Teams ==
Group 1	Group 2
Castlepollard; Castletown Geoghegan; Clonkill; Lough Lene Gaels; Raharney	Brownstown; Delvin; St Brigid's; St Oliver Plunkett's

== Knockout stage ==
=== Quarter-finals ===
2 September 2017 Quarter-final	Lough Lene Gaels	2-16 - 0-14	St Oliver Plunkett's	TEG Cusack Park
	D McNicholas 1-6, N Conaty 1-3, S Nolan 0-2, T Doyle 0-1, M McNicholas 0-1, C McCrossan 0-1, D Healy 0-1, D Carty 0-1.		C Lynch 0-4, D Kieran 0-3, C Curley 0-2, P Lynam 0-2, G Geoghegan 0-1, D Gavin 0-1, R Ryland 0-1.

2 September 2017 Quarter-final	Raharney	1-20 - 1-13	Delvin	TEG Cusack Park
	K Doyle 0-10, J Boyle 1-0, J Shaw 0-3, C Boyle 0-2, R Greville 0-2, B Smyth 0-1, C Doyle 0-1, E Keys 0-1.		A Clune 0-8, D Clune 1-0, D Clinton 0-2, O Cassidy 0-1, A Cox 0-1, R Kelly 0-1.

=== Semi-finals ===
9 September 2017 Semi-final	Raharney	0-16 - 0-13	Clonkill	TEG Cusack Park
	K Doyle 0-9, J Boyle 0-1, S Quinn 0-1, N Flanagan 0-1, J Goonery 0-1, R Greville 0-1, B Smythe 0-1, E Keyes 0-1.		E Price 0-3, B Murtagh 0-2, M Keegan 0-2, L Folan 0-2, L Loughlin 0-2, C Austin 0-1, N Mitchell 0-1.

9 September 2017 Semi-final	Castletown Geoghegan	1-15 - 0-16		TEG Cusack Park
	A Clarke 0-8, N O'Brien 0-4, C Deegan 1-0, J Clarke 0-1, E Quinn 0-1, C Glennon 0-1.		N Conaty 0-7, T Doyle 0-2, M McNicholas 0-2, D McNicholas 0-1, J Egan 0-1, M Daly 0-1, D Higgins 0-1, C McCrossan 0-1.

=== Final ===
1 October 2017 Final	Castletown Geoghegan	1-18 - 1-16	Raharney	TEG Cusack Park
	A Clarke (0-12, 9f), C Deegan (1-0), N O'Brien (0-2), S Clavin (0-2), M Heeney (0-1), D McCormack (0-1).		K Doyle (0-9, 6f, 1sl), J Boyle (1-0), B Smyth (0-2), J Shaw (0-1); R Greville (0-1), C Doyle (0-1), G Greville (0-1); E Keyes (0-1).	Referee: M Murtagh
