= Westmeath Senior B Hurling Championship =

Annual hurling competition for senior clubs in Westmeath

- Current season or competition: 2026 Westmeath Senior B Hurling Championship
- Irish: Craobh Sinsear B Iomána na hIarmhí
- Code: Hurling
- Founded: 2020; 6 years ago
- Region: Westmeath (GAA)
- Trophy: Mickey Power Cup
- No. of teams: 6
- Title holders: St Oliver Plunkett's (2nd title)
- First winner: Crookedwood
- Most titles: Fr Dalton's, St Oliver Plunkett's (2 titles)
- Sponsors: Slevin's Coaches
- TV partner: Iarmhí TV
- Official website: Westmeath GAA

The Westmeath Senior B Hurling Championship (known for sponsorship reasons as the Slevin's Coaches Westmeath Senior B Hurling Championship and abbreviated to the Westmeath SBHC) is an annual hurling competition organised by the Westmeath County Board of the Gaelic Athletic Association from 2020 for the second tier senior hurling teams in the county of Westmeath in Ireland.

In its current format, the Westmeath Senior B Hurling Championship begins with a group stage. The six participating teams play each other in a round-robin system. The three top-ranking teams proceed to the knockout phase that culminates with the final match at TEG Cusack Park. The winner of the Westmeath Senior B Championship qualifies for the subsequent Leinster Intermediate Club Championship.

Delvin are the title holders after defeating St Oliver Plunkett's by 1-25 t0 0-23 in a replay after extra-time in the 2025 final.

== History ==
The Westmeath Intermediate Championship was founded in 1985 in an effort to bridge the standard of play between the Westmeath Senior Championship and the Westmeath Junior Championship. For 35 years, the Westmeath Intermediate Championship was the second tier championship in the Westmeath hurling championship system.

A review of Westmeath's hurling championships in 2019 proposed that the Westmeath SHC and Westmeath IHC be restructured. This resulted in the creation of the Westmeath SBHC. Each of the three championships would consist of six teams. The inaugural championship in 2020 featured three regraded teams from Group B of the 2019 Westmeath SHC, the loser of the SHC relegation playoff and the two 2019 Westmeath IHC finalists.

== Format ==
=== Group stage ===
Six clubs start in the group stage. Over the course of the group stage, each team plays once against the others in the group, resulting in each team being guaranteed five group games. Two points are awarded for a win, one for a draw and zero for a loss. The teams are ranked in the group stage table by points gained, then scoring difference and then their head-to-head record. The top three teams qualify for the knockout stage

=== Knockout stage ===
Semi-finals: The second and third-placed teams from the group stage contest this round. The winner of this game advances to the final.

Final: The top team from the group stage and the semi-final winner contest the final. The winning team are declared champions.

=== Relegation ===
The fifth and sixth-placed teams from the group stage, if level on points, take part in a relegation playoff to the Westmeath Intermediate Hurling Championship.

== Teams ==
=== 2027 Teams ===
The 6 teams that will compete in the 2027 Westmeath Senior B Hurling Championship are:

Club	Location	Championship titles	Last championship title
Brownstown	Archerstown	0	—
Castlepollard	Castlepollard	0	—
Crookedwood	Crookedwood	1	2020
Fr Dalton's	Ballymore	2	2024
St Brigid's	Dalystown	0	—
Turin	Turin	0	—

== Qualification for subsequent competitions ==
At the end of the championship, the winning team qualify to the subsequent Leinster Intermediate Club Hurling Championship, the winner of which progresses to the All-Ireland Intermediate Club Hurling Championship.

== Sponsorship ==
Slevin's Coaches had been providing sponsorship for a number of years and were unveiled as the sponsor of the Westmeath SBHC in July 2020.

== Trophy and medals ==
The Mickey Power Cup is the current prize for winning the championship. It was commissioned to honour Mickey Power, a member of the Cullion club who served in a number of administrative roles with the Westmeath County Board, including as Chairman of the Hurling Board. He died in February 2020, shortly before the start of the inaugural championship.

In accordance with GAA rules, the County Board awards a set of gold medals to the championship winners. The medals depict a stylised version of the Westmeath GAA crest.

== List of finals ==
=== List of Westmeath SBHC finals ===
Year	Winners		Runners-up		Venue	#
Year	Club	Score	Club	Score	Venue	#
2026	St Oliver Plunkett's	4-16	Castlepollard	2-14	TEG Cusack Park	
2025	Delvin	1-21, 1-25 (R)	St Oliver Plunkett's	3-15', 0-23 (AET)	TEG Cusack Park; Lakepoint Park, Mullingar	
2024	Fr Dalton's	3-12	Delvin	3-11	TEG Cusack Park	
2023	St Oliver Plunkett's	2-21	Ringtown	0-10	TEG Cusack Park	
2022	Fr Dalton's	1-20	Delvin	3-13	TEG Cusack Park	
2021	Cullion	5-20	Delvin	0-11	TEG Cusack Park	
2020	Crookedwood	0-16	Fr Dalton's	1-10	TEG Cusack Park	

== Roll of honour ==
=== By club ===
#	Club	Titles	Runners-up	Championship wins	Championship runner-up
1	St Oliver Plunkett's	2	1	2023, 2026	2025
1	Fr Dalton's	2	1	2022, 2024	2020
3	Delvin	1	2	2025	2021, 2022, 2024
3	Cullion	1	0	2021	—
3	Crookedwood	1	0	2020	—
6	Ringtown	0	1	—	2023
6	Castlepollard	0	1	—	2026

== See also ==
- Westmeath Senior Hurling Championship
- Westmeath Intermediate Hurling Championship
