= John Gilligan (hurler) =

Irish hurler and Gaelic footballer

Personal information
- Born: Ireland

Sport
- Position: Defender
Club
- Years: Club
- Ballymore/Fr.Daltons
Inter-county
- Years: County
- 2011-: Westmeath
Inter-county titles
- Leinster titles: 0
- All-Irelands: 0
- All Stars: 0
	Football	Hurling
League titles	0	0

John Gilligan is an Irish sportsperson. He has played hurling and Gaelic football with the Westmeath senior inter-county hurling and football teams. On 22 May 2011, he made his championship debut with the Westmeath senior hurling team during the 2011 All-Ireland Senior Hurling Championship, coming on as a substitute in a 4–10 to 1–14 win against Carlow. He has also played with the Westmeath senior football team, and was a member of the Westmeath team that reached the 2015 Leinster Senior Football Championship final. At club level, he has played with Ballymore Gaelic Football Club and Fr. Dalton's Hurling Club.
