= 2024 Westmeath Intermediate Hurling Championship =

- Dates: July 13 - October 28, 2024
- Teams: 6
- Sponsor: Slevin's Coaches
- Champions: Brownstown (5th title); Conor Shaw (captain)
- Runners-up: Southern Gaels
- Promoted: Brownstown

Tournament statistics
- Matches played: 17
- Goals scored: 64 (3.76 per match)
- Points scored: 694 (40.82 per match)

The 2024 Westmeath Intermediate Hurling Championship was the thirty-fifth staging of the Westmeath Intermediate Hurling Championship since its current establishment by the Westmeath County Board in 1985.

The first round draws of games were streamed live via YouTube on April 4, while the full schedule was released via Twitter on June 17.

A total of six teams contest the Westmeath Intermediate Hurling Championship. Brownstown were relegated back down to Intermediate from Senior B last year. Clonkill, Raharney, Southern Gaels, St Brigid's, and Turin round out the field.

The final at TEG Cusack Park in Mullingar will be contested by Brownstown and Southern Gaels. Brownstown won the final 6-17 - 3-8, to win their fifth title, and promotion straight back to the Westmeath Senior B Hurling Championship for 2025.

== Results ==
=== Group stage ===
Advance to Semi-Finals

| Team | Matches | | | | Score | | | Pts |
| Team | Pld | W | D | L | For | Against | Diff | Pts |
|---|---|---|---|---|---|---|---|---|
| Brownstown | 5 | 4 | 1 | 0 | 115 | 70 | 45 | 9 |
| Southern Gaels | 5 | 3 | 1 | 1 | 97 | 81 | 16 | 7 |
| St Brigid's | 5 | 3 | 0 | 2 | 101 | 101 | 0 | 6 |
| Raharney | 5 | 2 | 1 | 2 | 104 | 94 | 13 | 5 |
| Turin | 5 | 1 | 0 | 4 | 88 | 106 | -18 | 2 |
| Clonkill | 5 | 0 | 1 | 4 | 79 | 132 | -53 | 1 |

==== Fixtures ====
| Jul 13 Round 1 | Southern Gaels | 0-18 - 0-16 | Turin | Ballymore |
| | | | | Referee: Gary Hurley |

| Jul 13 Round 1 | St Brigid's | 0-12 - 1-22 | Brownstown | Killucan |
| | | | | Referee: Sean Carroll |

| Jul 14 Round 1 | Clonkill | 1-24 - 4-15 | Raharney | Delvin |
| | | | | Referee: Kenneth Gunning |

| Aug 3 Round 2 | Turin | 2-16 - 2-10 | Clonkill | The Downs |
| | | | | Referee: Derek Heffernan |

| Aug 4 Round 2 | Raharney | 2-15 - 4-13 | St Brigid's | Delvin |
| | | | | Referee: Matt Shaw |

| Aug 4 Round 2 | Brownstown | 0-16 - 1-13 | Southern Gaels | TEG Cusack Park |
| | | | | Referee: Kenneth Gunning |

| Aug 16 Round 3 | St Brigid's | 3-12 - 0-13 | Clonkill | Delvin |
| | | | | Referee: Deerek Heffernan |

| Aug 16 Round 3 | Raharney | 3-12 - 2-12 | Southern Gaels | Ballymore |
| | | | | Referee: Matt Shaw |

| Aug 16 Round 3 | Brownstown | 1-18 - 2-14 | Turin | Killucan |
| | | | | Referee: Mick Murtagh |

| Aug 31 Round 4 | Turin | 0-9 - 2-17 | Raharney | Robinstown |
| | | | | Referee: Matt Shaw |

| Aug 31 Round 4 | Southern Gaels | 3-12 - 1-12 | St Brigid's | Castletown |
| | | | | Referee: Derek Heffernan |

| Aug 31 Round 4 | Clonkill | 2-4 - 5-23 | Brownstown | Killucan |
| | | | | Referee: Alfie Devine |

| Sep 21 Round 5 | Brownstown | 0-12 - 1-12 | Raharney | Collinstown |
| | | | | Referee: Matt Shaw |

| Sep 21 Round 5 | St Brigid's | 4-16 - 3-12 | Turin | TEG Cusack Park |
| | | | | Referee: Derek Heffernan |

| Sep 21 Round 5 | Clonkill | 0-13 - 2-18 | Southern Gaels | Rochfortbridge |
| | | | | Referee: Raymond Farrelly |

=== Knockout stage ===
==== Fixtures ====
| Oct 5 Semi-Final | Brownstown | 2-16 - 1-11 | Raharney | TEG Cusack Park |
| | | Report | | Referee: Sean Carroll |

| Oct 5 Semi-Final | Southern Gaels | 0-14 - 1-5 | St Brigid's | TEG Cusack Park |
| | | Report | | Referee: Matt Shaw |

| Oct 26 Final | Brownstown | 6-17 - 3-8 | Southern Gaels | TEG Cusack Park |
| | | | | Referee: Sean Carroll |
