= St Oliver Plunkett's GAA =

St Oliver Plunkett's GAA may refer to:

- Oliver Plunketts GAA, a sports club based in Ahiohill, Ireland
- St Oliver Plunketts/Eoghan Ruadh GAA, a sports club in Dublin, Ireland
- St Oliver Plunkett's GAA (Westmeath), a hurling club in Mullingar, Ireland

== See also ==
- St Oliver Plunkett Park, a sports venue
