= 2015 Westmeath Senior Hurling Championship =

Annual hurling competition season

- Dates: 18 April 2015 – 18 October 2015
- Teams: 8
- Champions: Clonkill (14th title)
- Runners-up: Raharney
- Relegated: St Oliver Plunkett's GAA

The 2015 Westmeath Senior Hurling Championship was the 111th staging of the Westmeath Senior Hurling Championship since its establishment by the Westmeath County Board in 1903. The championship began on 18 April 2015 and ended on 18 October 2015.

Raharney were the defending champions. St. Brigid's entered as a promoted team from the intermediate championship.

On 18 October 2015, Clonkill won the championship following a 1–14 to 1–10 defeat of Raharney in the final. This was their 14th championship title, their first in three championship seasons.

St Oliver Plunkett's GAA were relegated from the championship, following a 2–11 to 2–10 defeat by Delvin.

== Results ==
=== Relegation play-off ===
| 10 October 2015 Play-off | Delvin | 2-11 - 2-10 | St Oliver Plunkett's GAA | Cusack Park |

=== Semi-finals ===
| 3 October 2015 Semi-final | Clonkill | 3-14 - 2-9 | Castlepollard | Cusack Park |

| 3 October 2015 Semi-final | Raharney | 1-14 - 2-8 | Lough Lene Gaels | Cusack Park |

=== Final ===
| 18 October 2015 Final | Clonkill | 1-14 - 1-10 | Raharney | Cusack Park |
