= 2010 Christy Ring Cup =

- Dates: 8 May – 3 July 2010
- Teams: 8
- Champions: Westmeath; Aaron Craig (captain); Kevin Martin (manager)
- Runners-up: Kerry; Colin Harris (captain); John Meyler (manager)

Tournament statistics
- Matches played: 13
- Goals scored: 46 (3.54 per match)
- Points scored: 441 (33.92 per match)

The 2010 Christy Ring Cup was the sixth edition of the Christy Ring Cup since its establishment by the Gaelic Athletic Association in 2005 as the second-tier of hurling for senior county teams, with the All-Ireland Senior Hurling Championship (SHC) as the first-tier of the system. It was contested by eight county teams.

Carlow were the reigning champions; however, they did not get the chance to defend their title due to their promotion to the All-Ireland SHC.

The 2010 Christy Ring Cup final was held at Croke Park, Dublin.

Westmeath defeated Kerry by a point.

== Team changes ==
=== To Championship ===
Relegated from the All-Ireland Senior Hurling Championship

- None

Promoted from the Nicky Rackard Cup

- Meath

=== From Championship ===
Promoted to the All-Ireland Senior Hurling Championship

- Carlow

Relegated to the Nicky Rackard Cup

- None

== Teams ==
=== General Information ===
County	Last Cup title	Last Provincial title	Last All-Ireland title	Position in 2009 Championship	Appearance
Derry	—	2001	—	Quarter-finals	5th
Down	—	1997	—	Runners-up	6th
Kerry	—	1891	1891	Semi-finals	6th
Kildare	—	—	—	Quarter-finals	6th
Mayo	—	1909	—	Semi-finals	6th
Meath	—	—	—	Champions (Nicky Rackard Cup)	5th
Westmeath	2007	—	—	Round 2	5th
Wicklow	—	—	—	Round 2	6th

=== Personnel and kits ===
County	Manager	Captain(s)	Sponsor
Derry	James O'Kane	Liam Hinphey	Ladbrokes
Down	Gerard Monan	—	Canal Court Hotel
Kerry	John Meyler	Colin Harris	Kerry Group
Kildare	Andy Comerford	Tony Murphy	Tegral
Mayo	Martin Brennan	Conor Ryan	Elverys
Meath	TJ Reilly	Michael Foley	Martin Donnelly
Westmeath	Kevin Martin	Aaron Craig	Hilamar Hotel
Wicklow	Casey O'Brien	—	Cosgrave Builders

== Format ==
The tournament has a double elimination format - each team will play at least two games before being knocked out.

- The eight teams play four Round 1 matches.
  - The winners in Round 1 advance to Round 2A.
  - The losers in Round 1 go into Round 2B.
- There are two Round 2A matches.
  - The winners in Round 2A advance to the semi-finals.
  - The losers in Round 2A go into the quarter-finals.
- There are two Round 2B matches.
  - The winners in Round 2B advance to the quarter-finals.
  - The losers in Round 2B go into the relegation playoff.
    - The losers of the relegation playoff are relegated to the Nicky Rackard Cup for 2011.
- There are two quarter-final matches between the Round 2A losers and Round 2B winners.
  - The winners of the quarter-finals advance to the semi-finals.
  - The losers of the quarter-finals are eliminated.
- There are two semi-final matches between the Round 2A winners and the quarter-final winners.
  - The winners of the semi-finals advance to the final.
  - The losers of the semi-finals are eliminated.
- The winners of the final win the Christy Ring Cup for 2010 and are promoted to the Liam MacCarthy Cup 2011.

=== Calendar ===
Round	Date
Round 1	Saturday 8 May 2010
Round 2A	Saturday 15 May 2010
Round 2B	Saturday 15 May 2010
Quarter-finals	Saturday 22 May 2010
Semi-finals	Saturday 5 June 2010
Final	Saturday 3 July 2010

== Round 1 ==
=== Matches ===
8 May 2010

Wicklow	1-19 - 2-12	Mayo
J O'Neill 0-12, A O'Brien 1-3, E Glynn, R Keddy 0-2 each	Report	C Hynes 2-1, B Moran 0-6, K Higgins 0-3, D McConn, D Dowling 0-1 each

Arklow
Referee: D. Copps (Cork)
8 May 2010

Down	1-19 - 0-27	Kerry
J Coyle 0-8, P Branniff 0-6, P Keith 1-0, C Woods, S Wilson 0-2 each, C O'Prey 0-1	Report	D O'Connell 0-11, J Egan 0-7, M Boyle 0-3, J-M Dooley, M Conway 0-2, S Young, Boyle 0-1 each

Páirc Esler, Newry
Referee: G. Devlin (Armagh)
8 May 2010

Meath	1-10 - 2-18	Kildare
D Kirby 1-1, P Durnin 0-3, P Fagan 0-2, N Kirby, M Mullally, S Clynch, B Slevin 0-1 each	Report	D. Harney 1-3, M Fitzgerald 0-5, M Moloney 0-4, J Houlihan 1-0, T Murphy 0-2, D Carter, C Kenny, D Kennedy, M Divilly 0-1 each

Páirc Tailteann, Navan
Referee: O. Elliott (Antrim
8 May 2010

Westmeath	5-15 - 3-16 AET	Derry
B Murtagh 2-4, J Clarke, A Dermody, J Hardman 1-0 each, C Curley 0-3, E Price, S Bardon 0-2 each, J Shaw, A Mitchell, A Dowdall, E Loughlin 0-1 each	Report	R Convery 0-9, P McCloskey 2-0, P O'Kane 1-0, D Brunton 0-2, O McCloskey, C Brunton, M Conway, P Henry, A Grant 0-1 each

Cusack Park, Mullingar
Referee: S. Roche (Tipperary)

== Round 2 ==
=== Round 2A ===
15 May 2010
Round 2A

Kerry	3-14 - 2-11	Westmeath
D. O'Connell 1-9, J.M. Dooley, S. Nolan 1-0 each, J. Griffin, J. Egan 0-2 each, G. O'Brien 0-1	Report	B. Murtagh 0-6, D. Carty 2-0, J. Shaw, J. Clarke, E. Price, P. Gilsenan, A. Dermody 0-1 each

Austin Stack Park, Tralee
Referee: J. O'Mahony (Westmeath)

15 May 2010
Round 2A

Kildare	1-19 - 1-16	Wicklow
D Harney 1-5, M Fitzgerald 0-4, M Moloney 0-3, D Carter 0-2, D Kennedy, T Murphy, C Kenny, A McAndrew, C Bonus 0-1 each	Report	J O'Neill 0-9, A O'Brien 1-3, D Hyland 0-2, MA O'Neill, C Kavanagh 0-1 each.

St. Conleth's Park, Newbridge
Referee: E. Morris (Dublin)

=== Round 2B ===
15 May 2010
Round 2B

Mayo	2-12 - 3-19	Down
R. Cullinane 1-3, N. Murphy 0-3, D. McDonnell 1-0, K. Higgins, D. McConn 0-2 each, C. Hynes, B. Moran 0-1 each.	Report	J. Coyle 1-12, P. Braniff 1-4, A. Savage 1-1, S. Wilson, E. Clarke 0-1 each

Fr. O'Hara Park, Charlestown
Referee: A. Kelly (Galway)

15 May 2010
Round 2B

Derry	0-15 - 2-16	Meath
A Grant, P Henry, S McBride 0-4 each, R Convery 0-3	Report	N Hacket 0-8, N Kirby 2-0, N Mullally, P Keogh 0-2 each, D Kirby, S Donoghue, P Durnin, K Fagan 0-1 each.

Fr. McNally Park, Derry
Referee: R. Matthews (Antrim)

== Quarter-finals ==
=== Matches ===
22 May 2010
Quarter-final

Westmeath	2-21 - 1-18	Down
B Murtagh 0-8, D Carthy, J Clarke 1-1 each, P Greville, L Smith, B Leharte, S Bardon 0-2 each, A Mitchell, J Shaw, E Loughlin 0-1 each	Report	P Braniff 0-8, J Coyle 0-6, S Clarke 1-0, E Clarke 0-2, S Wilson, C Woods, C Coulter 0-1 each,

Páirc Tailteann, Navan
Referee: E. Hassan (Derry)

22 May 2010
Quarter-final

Wicklow	3-13 - 1-18	Meath
E Glynn 2-1, J O'Neill 1-4, A O'Brien 0-4, D Hyland 0-2, E Kearns, R Keddy 0-1 each	Report	N Horan 0-5, S Clynch 0-4; N Kirby 1-1, N Hackett 0-3, K Fagan 0-2, D Kirby, M Mullally, P Durnin 0-1 each

St. Conleth's Park, Newbridge
Referee: D. Richardson (Limerick

== Semi-finals ==
=== Matches ===
5 June 2010
Semi-final

Kildare	0-18 - 3-19	Westmeath
M Fitzgerald 0-9, D Kennedy, M Moloney, A McAndrew 0-2 each; Damien Byrne, M Divilly, P Fitzgerald 0-1 each	Report	B Murtagh 1-5, B Leharte 1-4, R Whelan, D Carthy 0-3 each, A Dermody 1-0, A Dowdall 0-2, A Mitchell, S Bardon 0-1 each

Páirc Tailteann, Navan
Referee: E. Morris (Dublin)

5 June 2010
Semi-final

Kerry	2-17 - 2-14	Wicklow
D O'Connell 0-10, G O'Brien, M Boyle 1-1 each, J Egan, J M Dooley, S Nolan, C Harty, J Flaherty 0-1 each	Report	A O'Brien 2-2, J O'Neill 0-7, R Keddy 0-2, E Glynn 0-3

McDonagh Park, Nenagh
Referee: D. O Driscoll (Limerick

== Final ==
=== Final ===
3 July 2010
Final

Westmeath	2-16 - 1-18	Kerry
P Greville 1-2, D Carthy 1-2, B Murtagh 0-4, S Bardon 0-3, J Clarke 0-2, E Loughlin, B Leharte 0-1 each	Report	D O'Connell 0-8, J Egan 0-3, S Brick 1-0, J Griffin, M Boyle 0-2 each, M Conway, J Flaherty, S Nolan 0-1 each

Croke Park, Dublin
Referee: T. Carroll (Offaly)

== Bracket ==
Round 1 Round 2B
Kildare	2-18
Meath	1-10
Wicklow	1-19
Mayo	2-12
Mayo	2-12
Down	3-19
Derry	0-15
Meath	2-16
Down	1-19
Kerry	0-27
Westmeath	5-15
Derry	3-16

Round 2A; Quarter-finals
Kildare	1-19
Wicklow	1-16
Westmeath	2-21
Down	1-18
Meath	1-18
Wicklow	3-13
Kerry	3-14
Westmeath	2-11

Semi-finals
Kildare	0-18
Westmeath	3-19
Wicklow	2-14
Kerry	2-17

Final
Westmeath	2-16
Kerry	1-18
Relegation Playoff
Derry
Mayo

== Championship statistics ==
=== Top scorers ===
==== Overall ====
Rank	Player	County	Tally	Total	Matches	Average
1	Darragh O'Connell	Kerry	1-38	41	4	10.25
2	Jonathan O'Neill	Wicklow	2-32	38	4	9.50
3	Brendan Murtagh	Westmeath	3-27	36	5	7.20
4	James Coyle	Down	1-26	29	3	9.66

==== Single game ====
Rank	Player	County	Tally	Total	Opposition
1	James Coyle	Down	1-12	15	Mayo
2	Darragh O'Connell	Kerry	1-9	12	Westmeath
2	Jonathan O'Neill	Wicklow	0-12	12	Mayo
4	Darragh O'Connell	Kerry	0-11	11	Down
5	Brendan Murtagh	Westmeath	2-4	10	Derry
5	Darragh O'Connell	Kerry	0-10	10	Wicklow
7	Ruairí Convery	Derry	0-9	9	Westmeath
7	Jonathan O'Neill	Wicklow	0-9	9	Kildare
7	Martin Fitzgerald	Kildare	0-9	9	Westmeath
10	Andy O'Brien	Wicklow	2-2	8	Kerry
10	Brendan Murtagh	Westmeath	1-5	8	Kildare
10	David Harney	Kildare	1-5	8	Wicklow
10	Neil Hackett	Meath	0-8	8	Derry
10	Brendan Murtagh	Westmeath	0-8	8	Down
10	Paul Braniff	Down	0-8	8	Westmeath
10	Darragh O'Connell	Kerry	0-8	8	Westmeath

=== Scoring events ===
- Widest winning margin: 11 points
  - Kildare 2-18 - 1-10 Meath (Round 1)
- Most goals in a match: 8
  - Westmeath 5-15 - 3-16 Derry (Round 1)
- Most points in a match: 46
  - Down 1-19 - 0-27 Kerry (Round 1)
- Most goals by one team in a match: 5
  - Westmeath 5-15 - 3-16 Derry (Round 1)
- Most goals scored by a losing team: 3
  - Derry 3-16 - 5-15 Westmeath (Round 1)
- Most points scored by a losing team: 19
  - Down 1-19 - 0-27 Kerry (Round 1)
