= 2016 Westmeath Senior Hurling Championship =

Annual hurling competition season

- Dates: 18 June - 23 October 2016
- Teams: 6
- Sponsor: Slevin's Coaches
- Champions: Raharney (13th title); Paul Greville (captain); Johnny Greville (manager)
- Runners-up: Clonkill

The 2016 Westmeath Senior Hurling Championship was the 112th of the Westmeath Senior Hurling Championship since its establishment by the Westmeath County Board in 1903. The championship began on 18 June 2016 and ended on 23 October 2016.

Clonkill entered the championship as the defending champions.

The final was played on 23 October 2016 at Cusack Park in Mullingar, between Raharney and Clonkill, in what was their second successive meeting in a final. Raharney won the match by 2–18 to 1–13 to claim their 13th championship title overall and a first title in two years.

== Results ==
=== Final ===
23 October 2016 Final	Raharney	2-18 - 1-13	Clonkill	Cusack Park
