= Kevin Martin (hurler) =

Irish hurler and manager

Personal information
- Native name: Caoimhín Ó Máirtín (Irish)
- Born: 1973 (age 52–53) Tullamore, County Offaly, Ireland
- Occupation: Tullamore Steel employee
- Height: 6 ft 2 in (188 cm)

Sport
- Sport: Hurling
- Position: Left wing-back
Club
- Years: Club
- Tullamore
Club titles
	Football	Hurling
Offaly titles	2	1
Inter-county*
Years	County	Apps (scores)
1993–2003	Offaly	35 (0–03)
Inter-county titles
- Leinster titles: 2
- All-Irelands: 2
- NHL: 0
- All Stars: 2
- *Inter County team apps and scores correct as of 16:24, 30 January 2017.

Kevin Martin (born 1973) is an Irish hurling manager and former player. His league and championship career with the Offaly senior team lasted ten seasons from 1993 until 2003.

Born in Tullamore, County Offaly, Martin first played competitive hurling and Gaelic football at juvenile and underage levels with the Tullamore club. He later became a dual player at highest levels, winning two county football championship medals and one county hurling championship medal.

Martin made his debut with the Offaly senior team during the 1993-94 league. Over the course of the following ten years he won All-Ireland medals in 1994 and 1998. Martin also won two Leinster medals and two All Star awards. He played his last game for Offaly in March 2003.

In retirement from playing Martin became involved in team management and coaching at all levels. In 2009 he was player-manager as Tullamore claimed their first championship title in 45 years. Martin later managed Clough-Ballacolla of Laois to the championship title in 2015. At inter-county level he managed Westmeath to the Christy Ring Cup title in 2010, while also taking charge of the Westmeath under-21 team. Martin was appointed manager of the Offaly senior team on 7 November 2017.

== Playing career ==
=== Club ===
Martin plays his club hurling with the Tullamore club, however, it has only been in recent years that he has enjoyed any success.

In 2009 Tullamore bridged a forty-five-year gap to reach the final of the county senior championship. Kilcormac/Killoughey, a team hoping to win their very first championship, provided the opposition on that occasion. Tullamore were much the better team on the day and, even after having two penalties saved, easily won by 2–12 to 0–11. It was a first county title for Martin. Tullamore later represented Offaly in the provincial series of games and even reached the Leinster final. Ballyhale Shamrocks were the opponents and were made to work for their 1–16 to 1–8 victory.

In 2010 Martin's Tullamore side qualified for a second successive county final, this time against Coolderry.

=== Inter-county ===
Martin made his senior inter-county debut against Kilkenny during the 1993–94 National Hurling League campaign. In the subsequent championship he became a regular at left wing-back. That year, after a few years out of the limelight, Offaly bounced back in 1994. That year Martin won his first Leinster winners' medal following a 1–18 to 0–14 victory over Wexford. After defeating Galway in the All-Ireland semi-final, Martin later lined out against Limerick in the All-Ireland final. With five minutes left in the game Limerick were five points ahead and were coasting to victory. It was then that one of the most explosive All-Ireland final finishes of all-time took place. Offaly were awarded a close-in free which Johnny Dooley stepped up to take. Dooley was told by the management team to take a point; however, he lashed the ball into the Limerick net to reduce the deficit. Following the puck-out Offaly worked the ball upfield and Pat O'Connor struck for a second goal. The Offaly forwards scored another five unanswered points in the time remaining to secure a 3–16 to 2–13 victory. This sensational victory gave Martin an All-Ireland winner's medal in his debut season. He was subsequently presented with his first All-Star award.

In 1995 Offaly retained the Leinster title following a 2–16 to 2–5 trouncing of Kilkenny. It was Martin's and final provincial winners' medal. Down fell to Offaly in the subsequent All-Ireland semi-final, allowing Offaly to advance to the championship decider and attempt to put back-to-back All-Ireland titles together for the first time ever. It was the first-ever meeting of Offaly and Clare in the history of the championship. The game developed into a close affair with Offaly taking a half-time lead. Four minutes from the end substitute Éamonn Taaffe first timed a long range free straight into the net to give Clare a one-point lead. After a quick equaliser Anthony Daly sent over a 65-metre free to give his team the lead again. Jamesie O'Connor pointed soon afterwards and at the full-time whistle Clare were the 1–13 to 2–8 winners.

After a couple of seasons in the doldrums Offaly emerged again in 1998, however, the year was not without controversy. That year Martin's side reached the Leinster final but lost by five points to Kilkenny. This defeat prompted their manager, Babs Keating, to describe the Offaly hurlers as "sheep in a heap", and he promptly resigned. It looked as if Offaly's championship hopes were in disarray, however, they overcame Antrim in the All-Ireland quarter-final and qualified to meet Clare in the semi-final. That game ended in a draw 1–13 apiece draw and had to be replayed. The replay, however, was ended early because of a time-keeping error by the referee Jimmy Cooney. Following a protest on the pitch of Croke Park by the Offaly supporters it was decided that Clare and Offaly would meet for a third time. Martin's side won the third game and qualified to play Kilkenny in the final in a repeat of the provincial decider. On that day Brian Whelahan delivered one of his greatest performances. Despite suffering from 'flu, he started in defence and was later moved to full-forward where he scored 1–6. Offaly reversed the Leinster final defeat by winning the All-Ireland final by six points. Martin captured a second All-Ireland medal that day and later picked up a second All-Star award.

Two years later in 2000 Martin's side suffered a heavy defeat to Kilkenny in the Leinster final. As a result of the 'back-door' system in the championship both sides later faced off against each other again in the All-Ireland final. D. J. Carey capitalised on an Offaly mistake after just six minutes to start a goal-fest for 'the Cats'. Carey scored 2–4 in all, sharing his second goal with Henry Shefflin who also scored a goal in the second-half. At the full-time whistle Kilkenny were the champions by 5–15 to 1–14. It was one of the most one-sided finals in decades and marked the end of the great Offaly team of the nineties.

Martin continued with the Offaly team for another two years. He retired from inter-county hurling just before the start of the 2003 championship campaign.

== Management career ==
=== Early experience ===
Martin cut his teeth in management with his native club Tullamore. He was player-manager in 2009 as the club claimed their first county title since 1964. Martin guided Tullamore back to a second consecutive county championship decider in 2010.

=== Westmeath ===
In October 2009 Martin was confirmed as the new Westmeath senior and under-21 hurling team managers. His debut season as manager got off to a shaky start in the National League. Westmeath only won two out of the seven group games and were relegation candidates. Eventually Martin's side preserved their division 2 status as it was Kildare who bottomed out. The subsequent Christy Ring Cup campaign saw Westmeath enjoy some ups and downs, however, Martin's side eventually qualified for the final. Kerry, a team that defeated Westmeath in an earlier round of the competition, provided the opposition. A close and exciting game developed with the result remaining in doubt until the full-time whistle. When the game was over Westmeath were the champions for the third time in six years on a score line of 2–16 to 1–18.

In 2011 Martin's Westmeath competed in the Leinster championship.

After the success of 2010, 2011 turned out to be a bad year for both Martin and Westmeath as they finished bottom of Division 2 of the National League without a win and so were relegated to Division 3A for the 2012 season. Martin's tenure as manager was brought to an end before the start of the 2012 championship.

=== Offaly ===
In November 2017, Martin was named as the new manager of the Offaly senior hurling team.

In May 2019, Martin was replaced as manager by Joachim Kelly after back-to-back opening defeats in the 2019 Joe McDonagh Cup.

== Career statistics ==
=== As a player ===
Team	Year	National League			Leinster		All-Ireland		Total	
Team	Year	Division	Apps	Score	Apps	Score	Apps	Score	Apps	Score
Offaly	1993-94	Division 2	7	0-01	2	0-00	2	0-01	11	0-02
Offaly	1994-95	Division 2	9	0-01	2	0-00	2	0-00	13	0-01
Offaly	1995-96	Division 1	1	0-01	3	0-00	0	0-00	4	0-01
Offaly	1997	Division 1	5	0-00	3	0-00	0	0-00	8	0-00
Offaly	1998	Division 1A	5	0-01	3	0-01	5	0-00	13	0-02
Offaly	1999	Division 1A	5	0-00	2	0-00	2	0-00	9	0-00
Offaly	2000	Division 1A	2	0-00	2	0-00	3	0-00	7	0-00
Offaly	2001	Division 1A	2	0-00	1	0-00	0	0-00	3	0-00
Offaly	2002	Division 1B	2	0-00	1	0-00	2	0-01	5	0-01
Offaly	2003	Division 1B	1	0-00	0	0-00	0	0-00	1	0-00
Total			39	0-04	19	0-01	16	0-02	74	0-07

== Honours ==
=== Player ===
Tullamore

- Offaly Senior Football Championship (2): 2000, 2002
- Offaly Senior Hurling Championship (1): 2009

Offaly

- All-Ireland Senior Hurling Championship: 1994, 1998
- Leinster Senior Hurling Championship (2): 1994, 1995

Individual

- All Stars (2): 1994, 1998

=== Manager ===
Tullamore

- Offaly Senior Hurling Championship (1): 2009

Clough-Ballacolla

- Laois Senior Hurling Championship (1): 2015

Westmeath

- Christy Ring Cup (1): 2010

Achievements
Preceded by Kevin Ryan	Christy Ring Cup Final winning manager 2010	Succeeded by John Meyler
Sporting positions
Preceded by Éamonn Gallagher	Westmeath Senior Hurling Manager; 2009–2011	Succeeded by Brian Hanley
Preceded by Kevin Ryan	Offaly Senior Hurling Manager; 2017-2019	Succeeded by Joachim Kelly
