= Mergon =

Irish injection and blow molding manufacturer

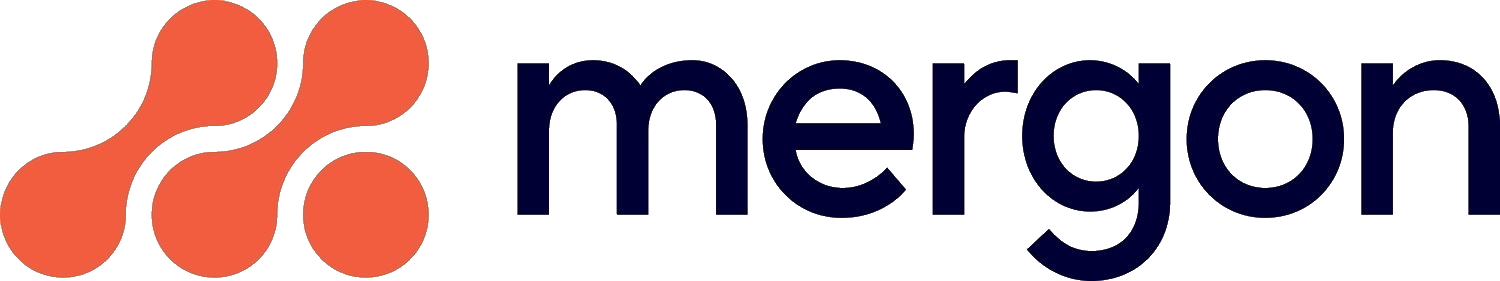
- Formerly: Marpac International Limited
- Industry: Injection moulding
- Founded: 22 January 1981; 44 years ago
- Headquarters: Castlepollard, County Westmeath, Ireland
- Key people: Patrick Beirne (CEO)
- Number of employees: c. 1000 (2022)
- Website: mergon.com

Mergon (formerly Marpac) is an Irish injection and blow molding manufacturer which creates products for the automotive, healthcare and industrial sectors. As of 2022, the CEO was Patrick Beirne and the company reportedly had approximately "1,000 employees worldwide".

== History ==
The company was founded, as Marpac International Limited, on 22 January 1981 in Castlepollard, County Westmeath, the Irish subsidiary of the U.S.-based plastic manufacturing company, Marpac Industries Incorporated. The new factory, which was classed as a IDA advance factory, was announced by the then Minister for Posts and Telegraphs, Albert Reynolds in February 1981. It was also said that the company would create 40 jobs by 1982 with the planned investment of £200,000 in the plant and machinery. In May 1981, the Castlepollard factory commenced operations. By April 1982, the company had 25 employees and was due to be officially opened by Suzanne Sykes, the president of the parent group. Marpac Industries Inc was acquired by PVC Container Corp in 1987.

In 1988, the Irish subsidiary changed its name to Mergon International and became fully Irish owned. As of 2022 it was led by Patrick Beirne (Beirne had formerly been a manager at Marpac Ireland).

In 1991, Mergon won a Xerox Corporation award for "product innovation and quality manufacturing".
