= Knockeyon =

Hill in County Westmeath, Ireland

- (Cnoc Eoghain)
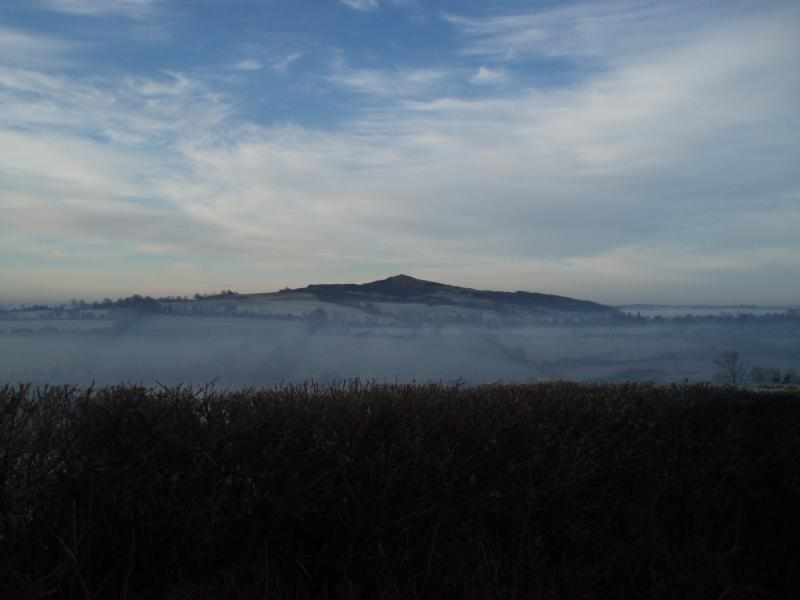
- Knockeyon on a foggy morning

Highest point
- Elevation: 214 m (702 ft)
- Prominence: 128 m (420 ft)
- Coordinates: 53°37′24.3″N 7°17′49.6″W

Geography
- Location within island of Ireland
- Location: County Westmeath, Ireland

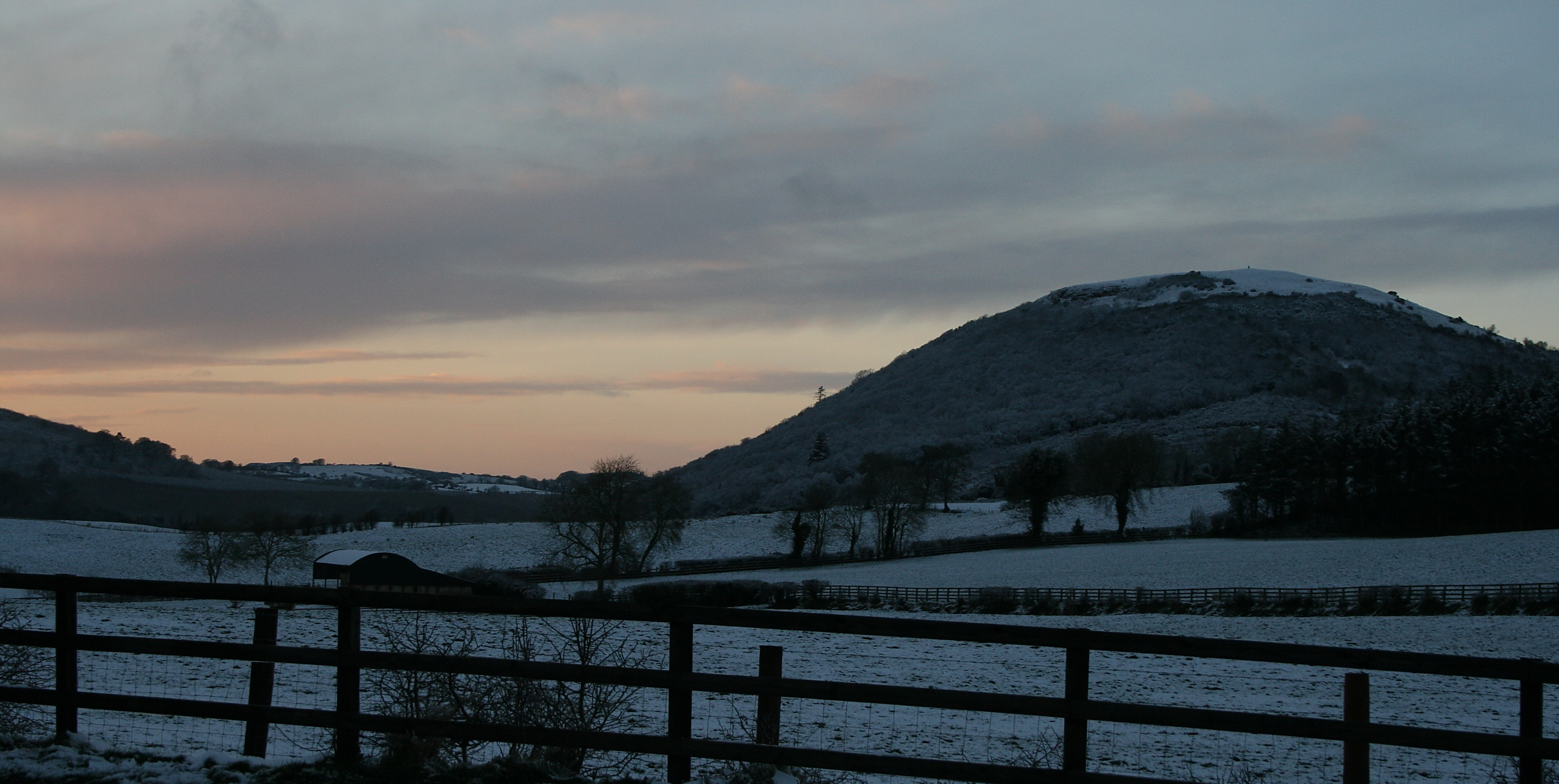
Knockeyon at Crookedwood

Knockeyon (Irish: Cnoc Eóin) is a hill in County Westmeath, Ireland in the townland of Streamstown.

== Location ==
The hill is on the southeastern shore of Lough Derravaragh and oversees much of the north Leinster countryside.

== Chapel ==
The ruins of a chapel (national monument WM012-206 ), are halfway up the hill. A devotional pattern was held annually around 1 August or the nearest Sunday to it.

Annotated as 'Chapel' on the OS maps this structure is situated within a dense hazel and oak historic woodland.

== Habitat ==
Knockeyon and other surrounding hills support deciduous woodland which mostly consists of native species. Hazel, rowan, ash, and oak are abundant. Exotic species occur occasionally, such as horse chestnut and other species introduced including beech.

The neighbouring Knockbody Wood is inhabited by wild pheasant and is a popular attraction for local pheasant hunters. On occasions, the Common pochard (Aythya ferina) population, which is one of the largest in Ireland, has exceeded the threshold for international importance. (i.e. 3,500 individual fowl).

Wild fowl	Winter 96 (individuals)
Little grebe	42
Great crested grebe	34
Cormorant	34
Mute swan	159
Whooper swan	102
Greenland white-fronted goose	409
Wigeon	207
Teal	52
Mallard	195
Pintail	6
Shoveller	12
Pochard	3,129
Tufted duck	1,073
Goldeneye	46
Coot	1,358
Golden plover	158
Lapwing	1,079
