= Crookedwood GAA =

GAA club in Cork, Ireland

Crookedwood
- Tigh Munna
- Founded: 1906
- County: Westmeath
- Colours
- Grounds: Crookedwood GAA Grounds

Playing kits
Standard colours

Senior Club Championships
	All Ireland	Leinster champions	Westmeath champions
Hurling:	0	0	0

Crookedwood GAA is a Gaelic Athletic Association club in Crookedwood, County Westmeath, Ireland. The club is affiliated to the Westmeath County Board and is exclusively concerned with the game of hurling.

== History ==
Located in the village of Crookedwood, County Westmeath, Crookedwood GAA Club was founded in 1906. Success was immediate, with the club winning the Westmeath JHC title in 1907. Crookedwood contested their sole Westmeath SHC final in 1913, however, the club disbanded in 1917 before being reorganised in 1922. The club claimed a second Westmeath JHC title in 1924.

Crookedwood underwent a number of name changes throughout its history, including Clann Lir and Taghmon Rovers, before reverting to its original name. The club won a third Westmeath JHC title in 1956. Crookedwood later amalgamated with Ringtown to form the St Vincent's club, however, that club broke up after a number of years but continued at underage levels. Crookedwood returned to fielding teams in their own right before once again disbanding between 1973 and 1981. A fourth Westmeath JHC title was won in 1986.

The new century has seen Crookedwood win Westmeath IHC titles in 2005, 2012 and 2018. Crookedwood returned to the top tier after beating Fr Dalton's by 0–16 to 1–10 to win the Westmeath SBHC title in 2020.

== Honours ==
- Westmeath Senior B Hurling Championship (1): 2020
- Westmeath Intermediate Hurling Championship (3): 2005, 2012, 2018
