= Lough Derravaragh =

Lake in County Westmeath, Ireland

- Loch Dairbhreach (Irish)
- Lake from the summit of Knockeyon hill

- Location within Ireland
- Location: County Westmeath
- Coordinates: 53°38′0″N 7°21′0″W
- Etymology: Irish loch dairbrech, "lake of oaks"
- Primary inflows: River Inny
- Primary outflows: River Inny
- Catchment area: 559.23 km^{2} (215.92 sq mi)
- Basin countries: Ireland
- Max. length: 10 km (6.2 mi)
- Max. width: 4 km (2.5 mi)
- Surface area: 9.14 km^{2} (3.53 sq mi; 2,260 acres)
- Max. depth: 23 m (75 ft)
- Surface elevation: 61 m (200 ft)

Ramsar Wetland
- Designated: 7 June 1996
- Reference no.: 847

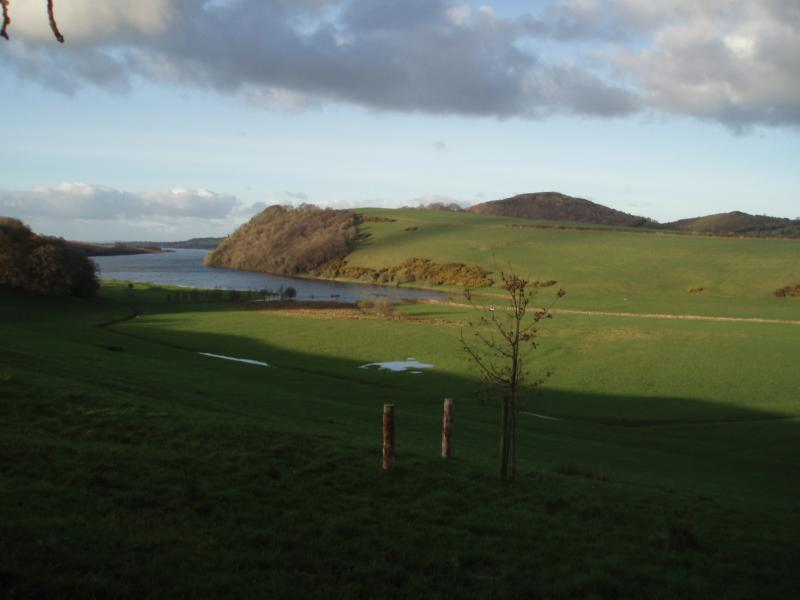
Lake with Knockeyon hill to the right

Lough Derravaragh (Irish: Loch Dairbhreach) is a lake in County Westmeath, Ireland, north of Mullingar between Castlepollard, Crookedwood and Multyfarnham.

Lough Derravaragh sits on the River Inny which flows from Lough Sheelin on its way to the River Shannon. It is a popular lake for angling and other watersports.

== History ==
There are ringforts to the east of Lough Derravaragh, within the hills of Ranaghan.

Turgesius the Viking, renowned for taking Dublin, also possessed strongholds nearby, southwest of Lough Lene.

Knockeyon, the hill of Saint Eyon, is located on the south-eastern shore of the lough, rising steeply to 215 metres. Halfway up the hill are the ruins of the ancient Saint Cauragh chapel, built and dedicated to Saint Eyon. The ruins of Saint Cauragh's Well are adjacent to the chapel.

On the Kiltoom side of the lough mounds of stone can be found, these were part of artificial islands and gave protection to the people who lived in crannógs on these islands. In the 1970s a dug-out canoe from the Stone Age was recovered from the lake by employees of the Tullynally estate.

== Legends ==
=== Children of Lír ===
Lough Derravaragh is best known for its connection with the Irish legend of the Children of Lír. The legend relates how the four children of King Lír were turned into swans by their jealous stepmother and spent 300 years on Lough Derravaragh before moving to the Straits of Moyle (between Ireland and Scotland) for 300 years, and then spent 300 more years on the Atlantic Ocean by Erris and Inishglora.

=== Saint Cauragh ===
Legend tells that Saint Cauragh was expelled by Saint Columcille from the Kells monastery, for breach of discipline. Consequently, he wandered throughout the countryside until he eventually arrived at Knockeyon.

At this location, far away from the eyes of the world, Cauragh desired to pass the remainder of his life praying to God and fasting. He became seriously ill at a later stage, and was dying when he prayed to God for water to quench his thirst. Having prayed for some time, he became aware of the sound of water trickling out of the rock above his head. He put out his hand and drank freely of this miraculous water. He was cured as a result, and then he built the chapel.

During the Middle Ages, thousands of people visited this well on the first Sunday of harvest, undertaking the pilgrimage up the hill barefoot on what became known as Cauragh Sunday. When the pilgrimage concluded, everyone present adjourned to a green area at the foot of the hill where musicians played and everyone spent the remainder of the day picnicking, drinking and dancing.

== Protected areas ==
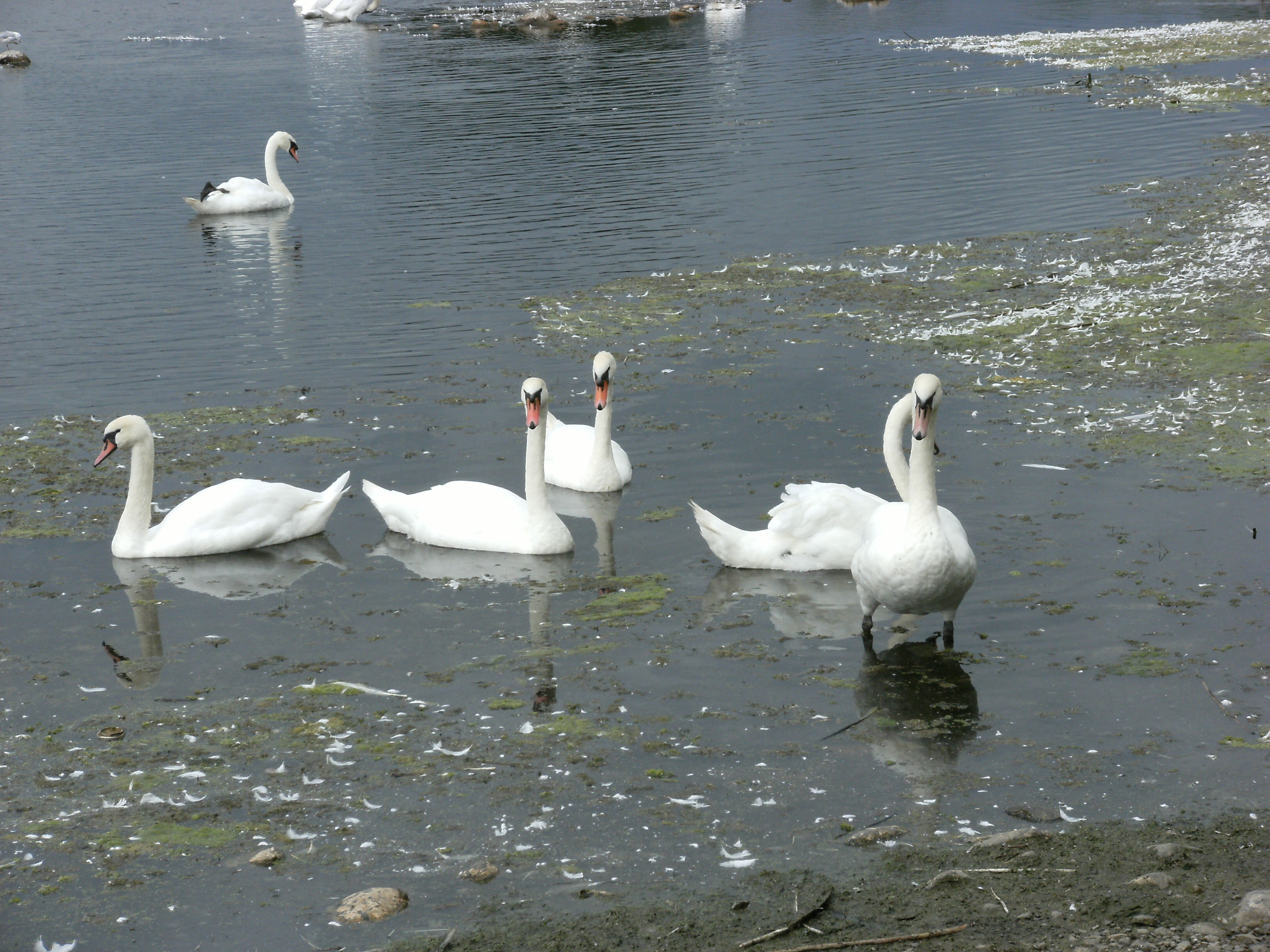
Swans on the lake

Lough Derravaragh is north of Mullingar and is part of the Lough Derravaragh Natural Heritage Area. Most of this area comprises the lake, but also it includes a variety of wetland, grassland, and woodland habitats. The site includes a small area of raised bog. The site is bound in the northwest by the River Inny.

The Inny, which is a major tributary of the River Shannon, flows into and from Lough Derravaragh on its northwest shore. On this side, the lake is wide and shallow and raised bog and cutover bog are found within the immediate surrounding area (cutover bog is bog where some peat has been harvested, leaving remaining peat behind). Lough Derravaragh is shallow and its water is "hard", meaning it is alkaline. There is only a small area of raised bog on the side, but formerly it comprised a very large bog complex which extended towards the northwest of the lake. Most of this area has now been cutover and large areas have been reclaimed for agriculture. The remaining area of bog has hummock/hollow complexes but no water pools. Conifers have been planted upon the high bog and a section of cutover. Cutover is found dispersed around the high bog areas and there is also a separate small area of old cutover south of this raised bog.

Much of the high bog possesses vegetation typical of an Irish Midland raised bog, with such species as ling heather (Calluna vulgaris) and hare's tail cottongrass (Eriophorum vaginatum). The hummock-forming bog moss, Sphagnum papillosum has been recorded situated around one third of the high bog as has the more scarce Sphagnum imbricatum. Overall, sphagnum covers around one-third of the high bog area. The centre of the bog is wet with stagnant water in places. The aquatic bog moss Sphagnum cuspidatum has been recorded in the hollows of the bog. There are dried-out channels of the bog which are colonised by algae, deergrass (Trichophorum cespitosum) and lichens. On the cutover on the southeast shore of the lake there are areas of downy birchy (Betula pubescens) woodland, with patches of gorse (Ulex europaeus).

A notable feature of Lough Derravaragh, as found at Lough Lene, are the range of stoneworts that occur within the lake. Eight species have been recorded here, several of which have a restricted range in Ireland. Fringing the lake's shores, a range of habitats has been created as a result of drainage of the River Inny. At the western side are extensive reed beds and swamps of downy birch and willows. Nearby, there is also freshwater marches vegetation dominated by sedges (Carex spp.) and often tussock-forming grasses such as tufted hair-grass (Deschampsia cespitosa) and fescues (Festuca spp.), with a flowering herbs including Bidens cernua, and trifid bur-marigold.

The lake shore is a mineral-rich substrate and several plant species of poor fen habitats occur in abundance, such as black bog rush Schoenus nigricans and long-stalked yellow-sedge Carlex lepidocarpa.

Lough Derravaragh is also a Special Protection Area (SPA) under the EU Bird Directive (EC/79/409). Three species (Greenland white-fronted goose (Anser albifrons flavirostris), whooper swan (Cygnus cygnus), and golden plover (Pluvialis apricaria)) are listed on Annex I of the directive, requiring special conservation measures concerning their habitat in order to ensure their survival and reproduction.

The rare Charophyte, Chara denundata, has been recorded in the area, while the Red List species otter (Lutra lutra) and Irish hare (Lepus timidus hibernicus) have also been observed within the lake district of North Westmeath.

== Water sports ==
The lake is used for canoeing and other water activities. As in Lough Ennell, Lough Owel, and Lough Lene, the lake acts as an important amenity for anglers, as it sustains a population of brown trout.

== See also ==
- List of loughs in Ireland
