= Jack Gillen =

Irish hurler

Personal information
- Native name: Seán Ó Giolláin (Irish)
- Born: 2001 (age 24–25) Mullingar, County Westmeath, Ireland
- Occupation: Quantity surveyor

Sport
- Sport: Hurling
- Position: Full-forward
Club
- Years: Club
- Cullion
Club titles
- Westmeath titles: 0
Inter-county
- Years: County
- 2021–: Westmeath
Inter-county titles
- Leinster titles: 0
- All-Irelands: 0
- NHL: 0
- All Stars: 0

Jack Gillen (born 2001) is an Irish hurler who plays for Westmeath Championship club Cullion and at inter-county level with the Westmeath senior team. He usually lines out as a forward.

== Career ==
Gillen first played hurling at juvenile and underage levels with the Cullion club just outside Mullingar. He eventually progressed onto the club's top adult team and won a Westmeath SBHC title in 2021. Gillen first appeared on the inter-county scene as a member of the Westmeath minor hurling team in 2017, before lining out with the under-21 team. He was drafted onto the Westmeath senior team in 2021.

== Honours ==
Cullion

- Westmeath Senior B Hurling Championship: 2021

Westmeath

- Joe McDonagh Cup: 2021
