= Ballymore, County Westmeath =

Village in County Westmeath, Ireland

Ballymore An Baile Mór
- Village
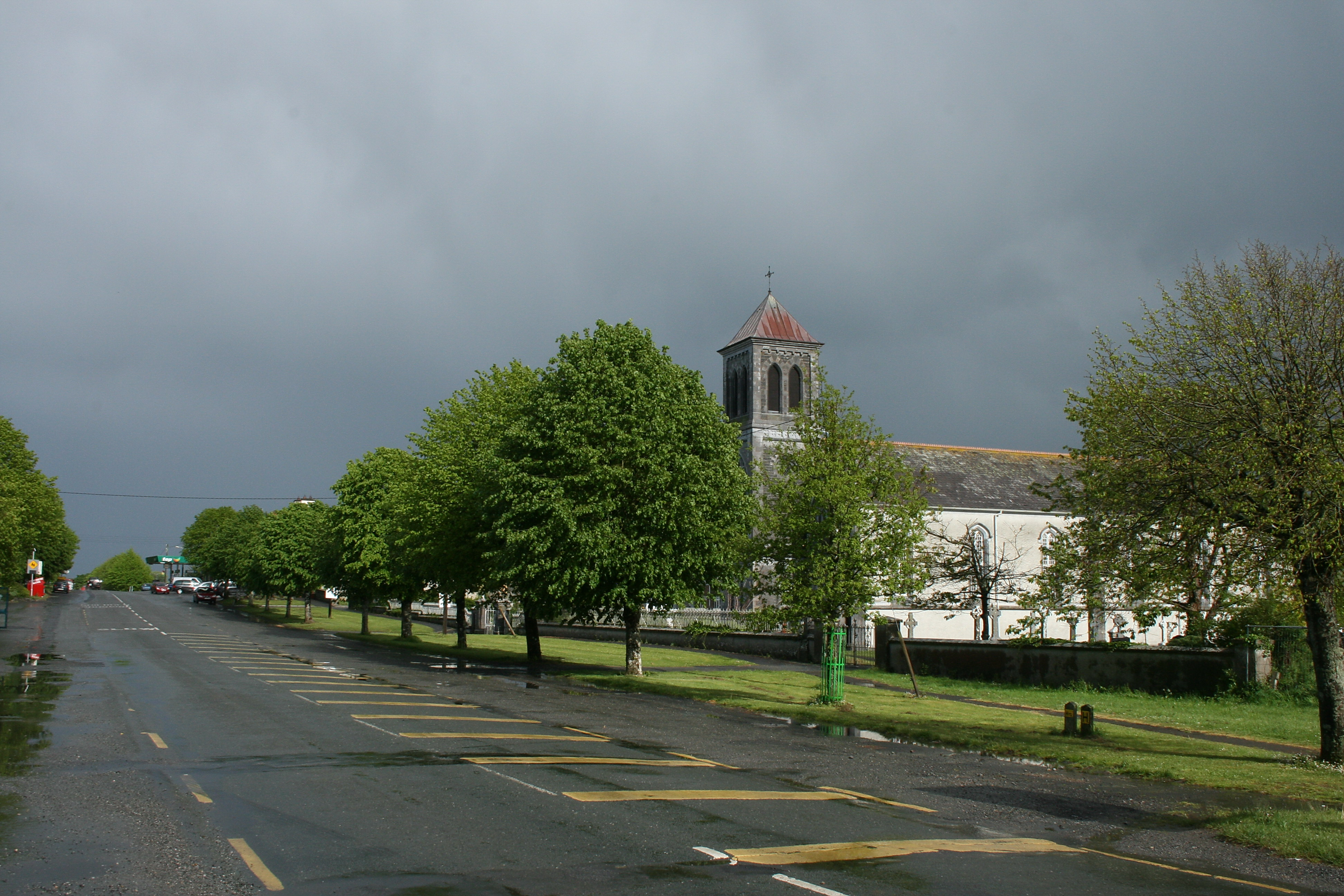
- R390 road through the village

- Location in Ireland
- Coordinates: 53°29′28″N 7°40′48″W
- Country: Ireland
- Province: Leinster
- County: County Westmeath
- Elevation: 128 m (420 ft)

Population (2022)
  - Total: 478
- Time zone: UTC+0 (WET)
  - Summer (DST): UTC-1 (IST (WEST))
- Irish Grid Reference: N209490

Ballymore (Irish: An Baile Mór, meaning 'big town') is a village in County Westmeath, Ireland. It is on the R390 road between Athlone and Mullingar, and the historic Hill of Uisneach is nearby. The village was known in medieval times as the medieval borough of Ballymore Lough Sewdy, or Loughsewdy, after the nearby lake, the site of an ancient bruighean, or hostel.

== History ==
Evidence of the area's history can be deduced by translation of some of its placenames. For example, one townland is Lugnacaha (often pronounced locally as "Lugahaca"), which translates as "the hollow of the battle". There is a field in Shinglis referred to as "Lug na Fola", which translates as "the hollow of the blood".

Plary Abbey was founded before the year 700, and a monastery, in honour of the Virgin Mary, for Gilbertin canons, which order consisted of canons of the Premonstre order, and Benedictine nuns, was erected here by the de Lacey family. The church of this monastery was for a short time the cathedral church of the diocese of Meath.

Writing in 1826, the British topographer and novelist James Norris Brewer states that the Gilbertine Abbey was founded in 1218, on the site of a monastery that had stood there from before the year 700. He describes the location as being "at the foot of the Hill of Clare, or Mullaghcloe", and says that on the summit are the ruins of Clare Castle.

In 1338, Theobald de Verdun, 2nd Lord Verdun, Justiciar of Ireland (born 8 September 1278), lord of the manor of Ballymore, obtained a grant of a weekly market, and a 15-day fair for in Ballymore.

In 1315, Edward the Bruce, younger brother of Robert the Bruce of Scotland, came to the village. He arrived in Ireland in May 1315, and was proclaimed king within a month. During his campaign in Ireland, Bruce stormed through the country attempting to subdue it, and spent Christmas of 1315 in Ballymore, at the manor of Theobald de Verdun, reportedly using up all the stocks of food there and extending his thanks by burning the manor to the ground as he left.

In the period of decline for the colony following the Bruce invasion and the Black Death, the lands around Ballymore fell to the hands of a locally based Hiberno-Norman family of Dalton. By the mid-fifteenth century, the Daltons in six branches were lords of Rathconrath barony one of which was based in Ballymore.

By about 1600, Ballymore had become the property of Sir Francis Shaen, an Elizabethan soldier, who had been involved in the plundering of Multyfarnham Abbey. In 1636, the castle, manor and lake of Ballymore were granted to Nicholas, first Viscount Netterville.

Towards the latter end of the wars of 1641, Ballymore was home to a garrison of English forces. Their garrison was located beside Lough Seudy, and divided from the mainland by "a deep and large graff, with ramparts of earth and bulwarks: the ditch was carried so low as to receive three or four feet of the stagnant water of the lake, over which was by a draw-bridge the entry into the fort; this was the chief fortress of this county".

In 1831, Ballymore village consisted of 121 houses, chiefly small houses or cabins, forming one long street. Today it is still sometimes jokingly referred to as "the village with two ends and no middle".

Substantial emigration took place from Ballymore to Argentina in the 1800s.

== Siege of Ballymore 1691 ==
The Williamite War in Ireland (Irish: Cogadh an Dá Rí, meaning "war of the two kings") was a conflict between Jacobites (supporters of Catholic King James II) and Williamites (supporters of Protestant Prince William of Orange) over who would be King of England, Scotland and Ireland. While James II was unpopular in England, he had widespread popular support in Ireland, and following the Glorious Revolution, in which he was overthrown by William of Orange who became William III of England, William landed troops in Ireland to put down Jacobite resistance. James left Ireland after defeat at the Battle of the Boyne in 1690, but the successful resistance at the Siege of Limerick gave the Irish Jacobites time. However they would be decisively defeated following the Battle of Aughrim in 1691.

Prior to that, in late 1690 and early 1691, while the main armies went into winter quarters, an area east of the Shannon became a zone of contention which was ruinous to the local population caught between the two forces. The Williamites established small garrisons around which irregular Irish forces, rapparees, and raiding troops from the Jacobite positions operated in small-scale actions. Ballymore however remained the principal forward position for the Jacobites and Sarsfield showed particular concern for its retention as covering the approach to Athlone.

In the lead up to what was to become the Battle of Aughrim, Mullingar was fortified by the Dutch-born Godert de Ginkell, 1st Earl of Athlone, Viscount of Aughrim and Baron of Ballymore, who in the spring of 1691, on William's instructions, took command as Lieutenant General of the Williamite forces in Ireland. Mullingar thus became the principal point of concentration of the Williamite forces, with Ballymore the first place in their sights as they moved towards Athlone.

With a large force of mounted and infantry troops, de Ginkell left Mullingar in early June for Ballymore, where, in a fort on the shores of Lough Seudy, a thousand adherents of James II were encamped. There was a smaller force, consisting of a sergeant only and a few men in a castle "on an eminence at some distance from the village", and it was this location that de Ginkell attacked first. The sergeant and his small band resisted, and when eventually they were captured, de Ginkell hanged the sergeant before turning his attention to the fort.

"The [fort], which stands on the verge of Lough Seudy, was defenceless towards the lake, and as the besiegers not only battered it with their artillery on the land side, but approached it on that of the water by boats, the governor, Colonel Ulick Burke deemed it right to surrender on the following day".

The Williamite forces lost just eight men in the siege.

De Ginkell remained at Ballymore for a further ten days, enabling his troops to prepare for their next engagement, which was to be at Athlone. At Ballyburn-Pass, between Ballymore and Athlone, de Ginkell and 20,000 troops were joined by the Duke of Wurtemberg and Count Nassau with 7,000 mercenaries before proceeding on to Athlone. Before leaving Ballymore, de Ginkell placed Colonel Toby Purcell in charge of the captured garrison, with, under his command, "but 4 companies of foot or no more than 240 men, exclusive officers" and the 51 officers, 780 soldiers and 220 raparees captured there were transported to Dublin, the officers to Dublin Castle, and the rest to Lambay Island, off the coast of Dublin, as internees.

Meanwhile, for the native population of Ballymore at the time, there was little joy in existence. An account from an eyewitness from the Williamite camp reported that the fort was "haunted by wretched people in the lowest stage of suffering, from the famine caused by the waste of both parties."

He reported that while the English army had supplies, they "could afford nothing to the crowd of forlorn and famishing outcasts whom danger collected around the camp; to these, so dreadful was their destitution that a morsel of garbage was a feast, and they flocked as ravens round the putrifying and blackened carcasses of dead horses which lay rotting in the summer sun".

== Significant buildings ==
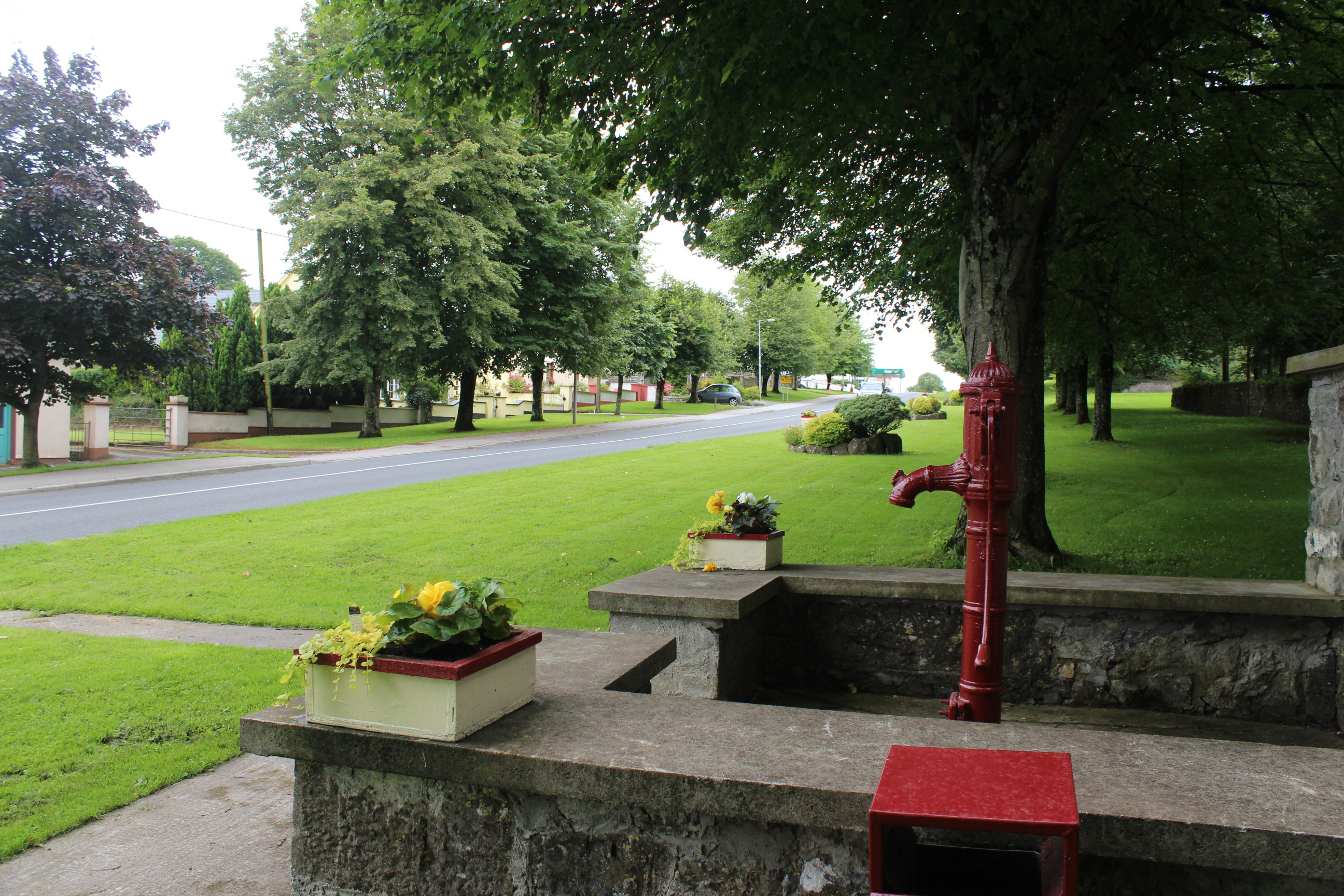
The parish pump in Ballymore, Co Westmeath

The Roman Catholic "Church of the Most Holy Redeemer" in Ballymore was built around c.1845 and is described in the National Inventory of Architectural Heritage as having been built in a Tudor-Gothic style with, circa 1870, early English Gothic-style alterations. It comprises a six-bay nave with an attached three-stage tower on square-plan to the north with a slated pyramidal roof, flanked to the east and west by advanced gable-fronted bays containing the main entrances. There is a single-storey flat-roofed sacristy to the rear.

At the end of Church Lane, at Market Hill, Ballymore, can be found the ruins of St Owen's Church of Ireland, erected in 1827 using a loan of £1200 from the Board of First Fruits. It comprises a three-bay hall to the east and a three-stage tower on square plan to the west end, having crow-stepped parapets and corner pinnacles. The churchyard contains a graveyard with mainly nineteenth-century grave markers, and there are the remains of single-cell chapel on rectangular plan to the east, built c.1625.

== Demographics ==
In the 2006 census, the village had a population of 485, a 6% increase above the 2002 census. The 2022 census recorded a population of 478. Or these, 405 were born in Ireland, 40 in the United Kingdom, 14 in other parts of the European Union and the remainder with another country of birth (or not stated).

== Festivals ==
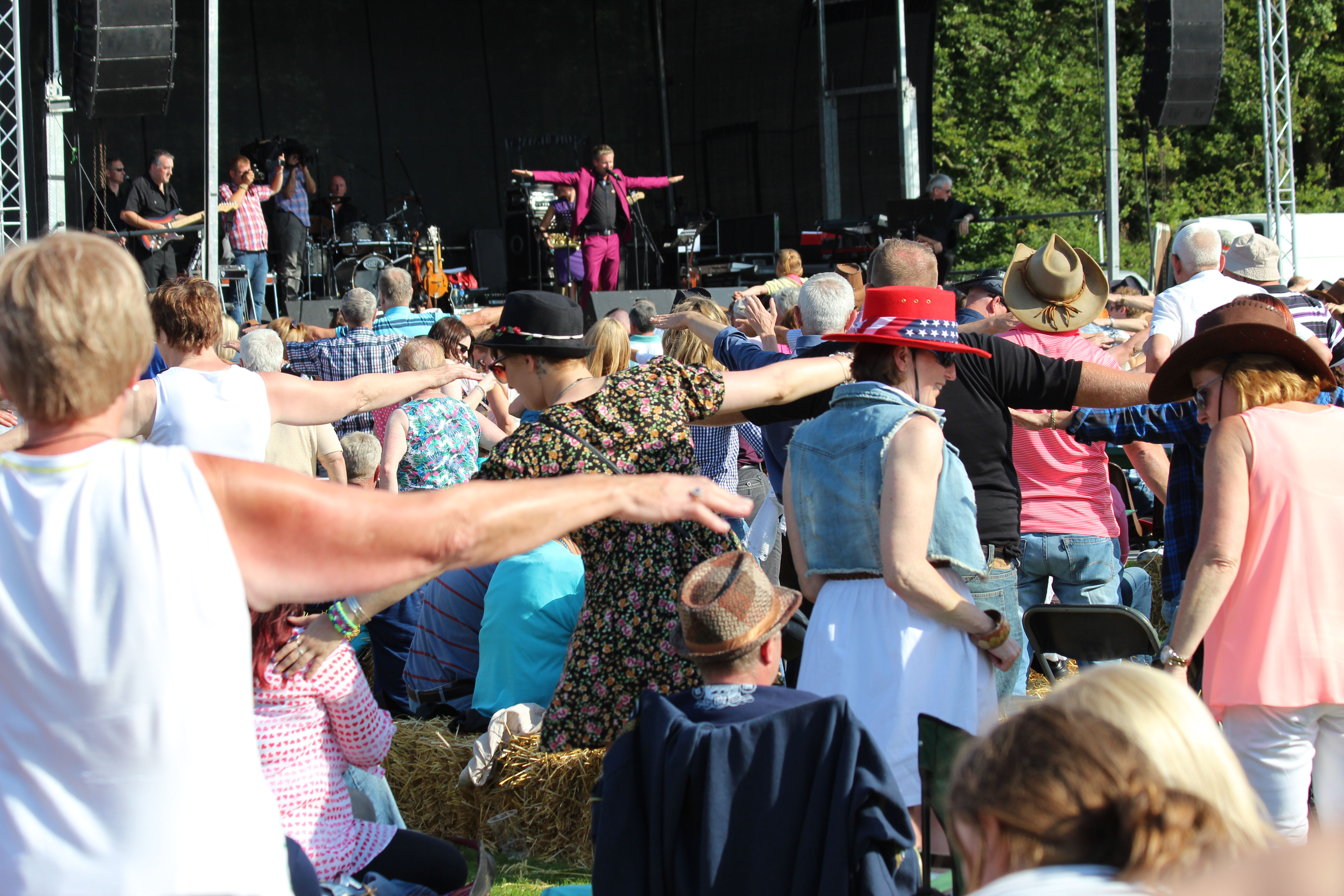
Singer Mike Denver on stage at the Ballymore Country Music Festival 2014

Ballymore Country Music Festival, which had run for around ten years in the late 1970s and early 1980s, was revived in 2013 by Ballymore GAA and Fr. Dalton's Hurling Club. The 2015 festival took place on 3 August with performances from Nathan Carter, Brendan Shine, and Johnny Brady.

== Sport ==
Ballymore is home to Ballymore GAA Club, which was founded in 1884. The club enjoy some success at intermediate level, and were Senior Finalists in 1965. Fr. Dalton's Hurling Club shares facilities with Ballymore GAA.

There is a Gaelic 4 Mothers & Others (G4M&O) club in the town. Ballymore G4M&O participated in the 2019 Gaelic 4 Mothers & Others National Blitz.

Ballymore has a bowls club that meets in Ballymore Community Centre on Wednesday nights. Within the community centre, there is also a handball court and a squash court.

Ballymore Pitch and Putt course is located 1.5 km south of Ballymore, on Moate Road.

== Notable people ==
- Alison Spittle, comedian, comedy writer, radio producer and actor

== See also ==
- List of towns and villages in Ireland
