= Aaron Craig =

Irish hurler

Personal information
- Born: 1992 (age 33–34) Mullingar, County Westmeath, Ireland
- Occupation: Soldier

Sport
- Sport: Hurling
- Position: Centre-back
Club
- Years: Club
- St Oliver Plunkett's
Club titles
- Westmeath titles: 0
Inter-county*
| Years | County | Apps (scores) |
| 2011– | Westmeath | 8 (0–0) |
Inter-county titles
- Leinster titles: 0
- All-Irelands: 0
- NHL: 0
- All Stars: 9
- *Inter County team apps and scores correct as of 17:23, 7 June 2014.

Aaron Craig (born 1992) is an Irish hurler who plays as a centre-back for the Westmeath senior team.

Born in Mullingar, County Westmeath, Craig first arrived on the inter-county scene at the age of seventeen when he linked up with the Westmeath minor team, before lining out with the under-21 side. He made his senior debut in the 2011 championship. Craig has since gone on to become a regular member of the starting fifteen.

At club level Craig plays with St Oliver Plunkett's.

== Honours ==
=== Team ===
Westmeath

- All-Ireland Minor B Hurling Championship (1): 2010
