= Castlepollard =

Town in County Westmeath, Ireland

Castlepollard Baile na gCros / Cionn Toirc
- Town
- The Square, Castlepollard in 2006

- Location in Ireland
- Coordinates: 53°40′47″N 7°17′56″W
- Country: Ireland
- Province: Leinster
- County: Westmeath
- Dáil Éireann: Longford–Westmeath
- EU Parliament: Midlands–North-West
- Elevation: 88 m (289 ft)

Population (2022)
  - Total: 1,349
- Irish Grid Reference: N461702

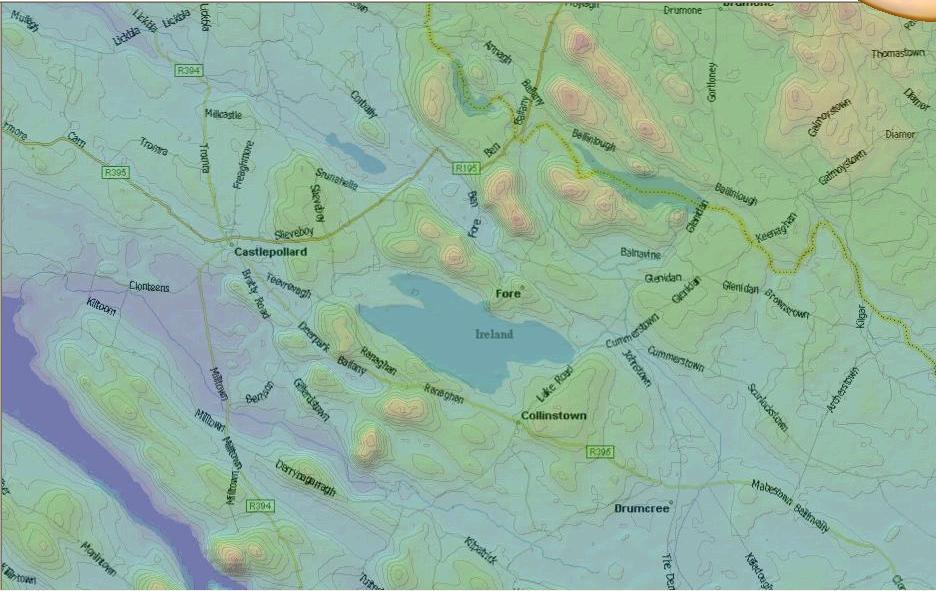
Castlepollard / Cionn Torc & Lough Lene

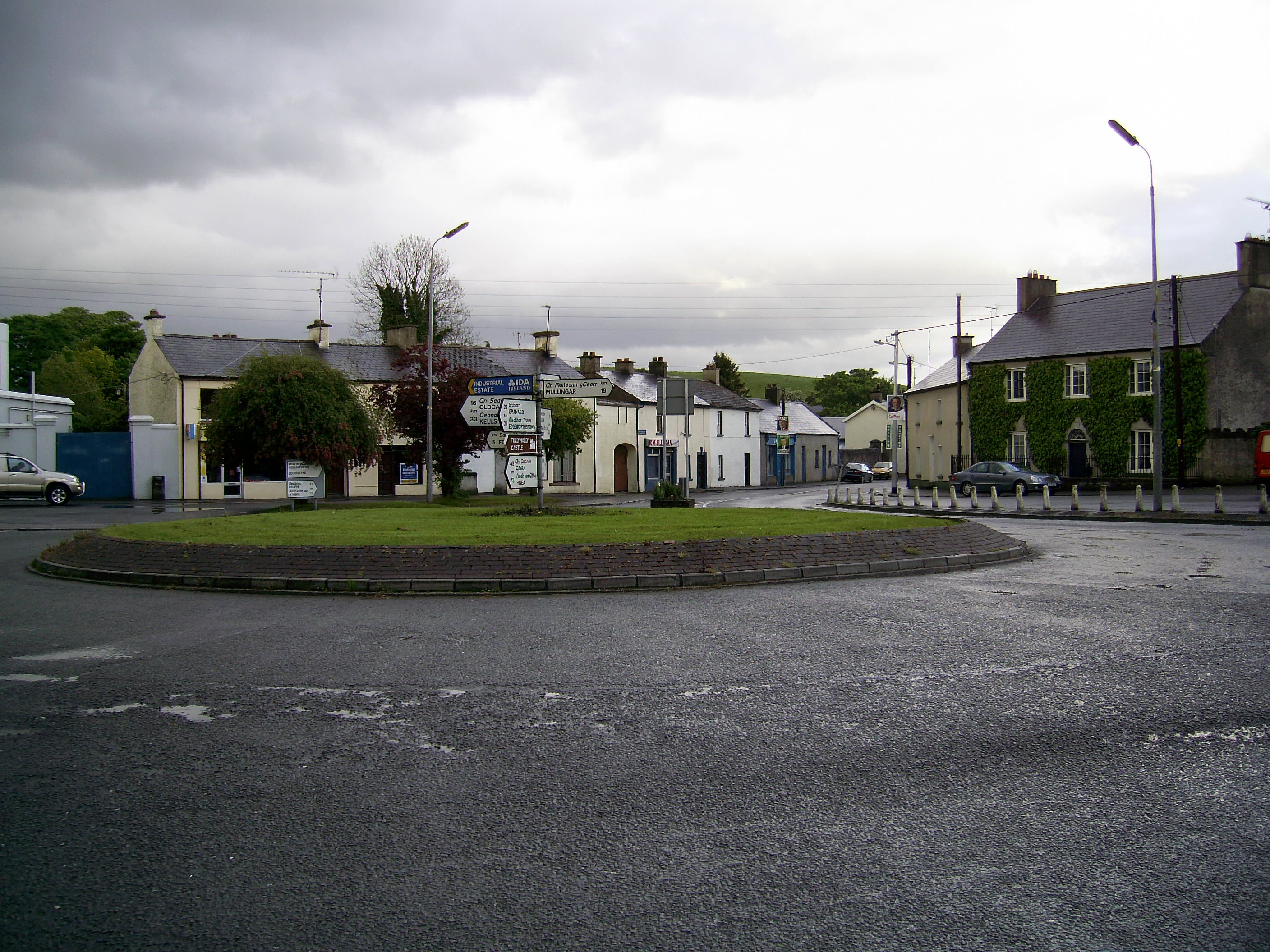
A roundabout in Castlepollard

Castlepollard (Irish: Baile na gCros or Cionn Toirc) is a small town in north County Westmeath, Ireland. It lies west of Lough Lene and northeast of Lough Derravaragh and Mullingar. As of the 2022 census, Castlepollard had a population of 1,349 people.

== Name ==
The name 'Castlepollard' comes from the name of a castle or fortified manor built by the English army captain Nicholas Pollard in the early 17th century. The town's official Irish name is Baile na gCros (anglicised Ballinagross), meaning "town of the cross (or crossroads)". However, the name Cionn Toirc (anglicised 'Kinturk'), meaning "head of the boar", has also been applied to the town. The townland of Kinturk Demesne covers the southern part of Castlepollard.

== History ==
=== 16th and 17th centuries ===
Nicholas Pollard, an English Army captain from Devonshire, arrived in Ireland in 1597 during the Nine Years' War. He fought under the Earl of Essex's command against the Gaelic Irish forces. After that campaign, Captain Pollard was settled on land in the Mayne area. Cionn Torc (Kinturk), a valley between the lakes, was granted 'in capite' by the ageing Queen Elizabeth I to Captain Pollard. He built a small castle at Rathyoung which he called Castle Pollard.

Walter Pollard, first son of Nicholas, married Ismay Nugent of Roscommon. He received a regrant of the demesne during the restoration period, following the Civil War and Cromwellian confiscations. The grant was made by charter from King Charles II, and approved by the Irish Parliament. In addition, he was granted a permit for a weekly market and a fair which was held four times annually. The Pollard family was reconfirmed in the manorial title by the edict of William and Mary. Serving as Commissioner for Supplies during the War of the Three Kingdoms, Pollard sat in the Irish Parliament, and became High Sheriff of the county in 1692. The family gradually improved the residence and the estate. They rebuilt the adjoining out buildings and developed the village of Castlepollard. They intermarried with the Dillon family of Ladyhill, the Pakenhams, the Duttons, the Tuites, and other landed county families. The descendants of Nicholas Pollard lived at Kinturk into the early twentieth century.

=== Castlepollard Massacre, 1831 ===
On 23 May 1831 members of the paramilitary Royal Irish Constabulary force (which Britain established to police Ireland) arrested a man following a fight at Castlepollard's fair. The crowd surrounded them until they released the man. At approximately 5pm that day, members of the same force returned, this time armed with muskets. These RIC members were then allegedly jeered by the crowd. In response, they lined up and fired shots. By the time they had finished 13 people lay dead, and many others were injured. The names of the dead were: Patrick Dignam, Mary Kiernan, John Slevin, Patrick McCormack, Brian Mahon, Tomas Kiernan, Patrick McDermott, Patrick McDonagh, Mary Neill, James Fagan, Patrick Keegan, Patrick Ledwich and Peggy Leary. 19 police officers were sent to Mullingar jail but at their hearing in Mullingar in July 1831 all 19 were discharged without conviction.

This incident may have been related to the enforcement of collection orders during the Tithe War (1831–1836). Spasmodic violence broke out around this time (particularly in Kilkenny, Wexford, and Cork) when the police entered local fairgrounds to enforce seizure orders on cattle for non-payment of tithes. Order was finally restored by rescinding seizure orders in 1836. The subsequent revision of the Tithe Act commuted the levy. The Church of Ireland was disestablished by the Gladstone government in 1869, and the tithe was abolished.

=== Built heritage ===
Castlepollard's original village layout, much of which dates to the 19th century, is preserved and now landscaped in a central triangular green. Surrounded by buildings from the Georgian period, a sculpture on the square depicts a scene from the locally centred legend of the Children of Lir. A plaque outlines the story in several languages. The setting of the legend is Lough Derravaragh. There are several ringforts on the surrounding high ground. Two ancient forts are of archaeological interest. Randoon is located in nearby Ranaghan, south west of Lough Lene, and Turgesius Island, is situated on Lough Lene. Turgesius was a Viking leader who sojourned here with a local lover while on respite from his seafaring. He held sway in Danish Dublin (Dyflin) and Shannon Viking port near Clonmacnoise.

Two churches serve the local Roman Catholic and Church of Ireland Christian communities. Kinturk House, the Georgian period Pollard residence, now serves as St. Peter's Centre. It was purchased by the Sacred Heart Sisters from the family in 1935, who added a chapel wing. A hospital designed by T.J. Cullen (1879–1947) was built c. 1935 and was part of "an extensive hospital construction programme initiated during the first decades of the Irish Free State" financed by the Irish Hospitals' Sweepstake. The sisters operated a Mother and Baby home there for many years; the property was sold to Midlands Health Board in 1971.

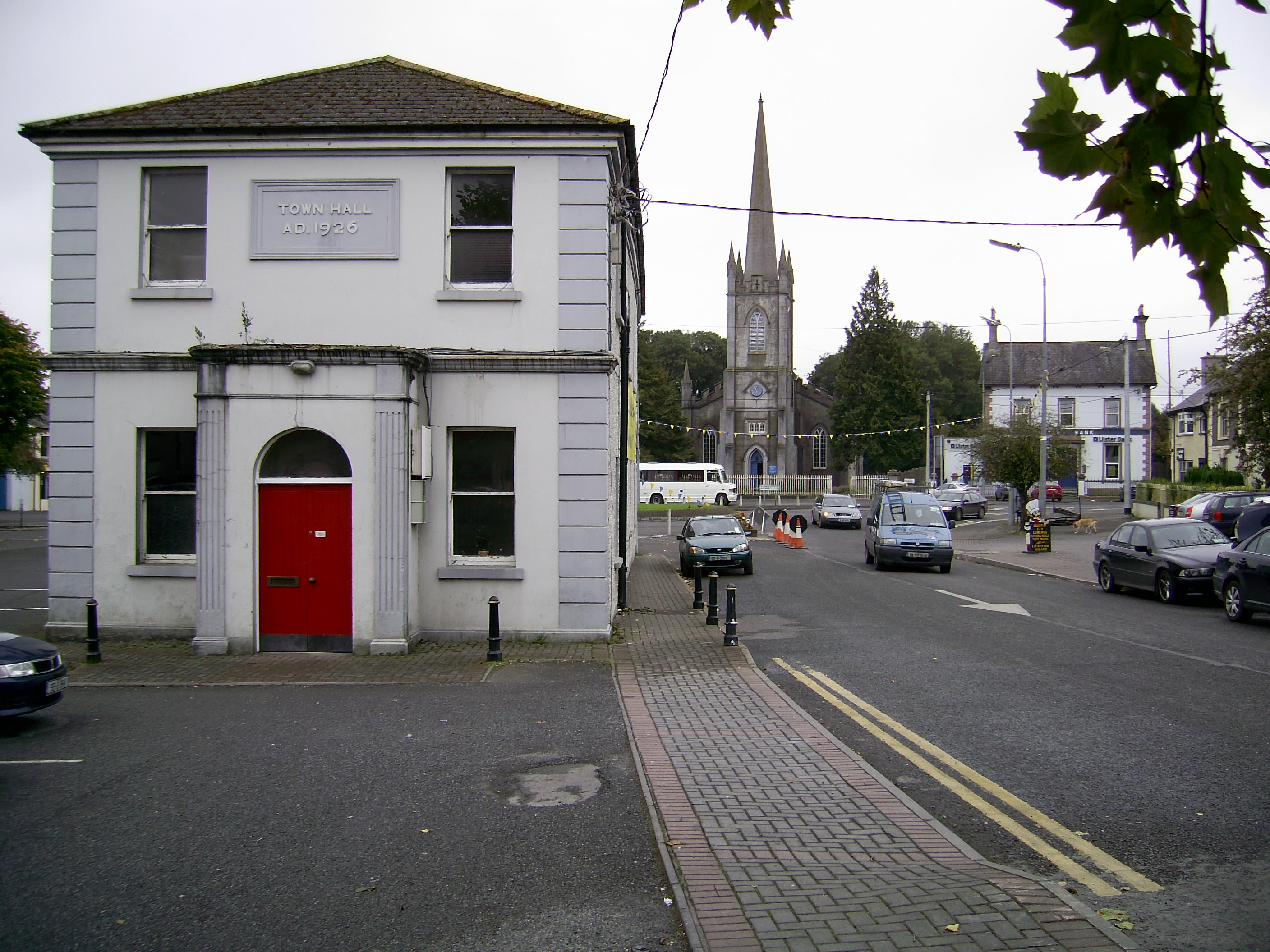
Castlepollard's 19th century Market House was rebuilt in 1926

In the early nineteenth century, the main village and the Pollard family properties underwent a reconstruction program. The Kinturk Demesne residence and the adjacent buildings were rebuilt in the Georgian style of the period. Some common lands were enclosed. A new Church of Ireland building was erected in the square, along with the Market House Located on the west side of the green, this was the village's major public building and landmark. The quarterly Court of Petty Sessions convened here.

During the War of Independence the Irish Republican Army (IRA) burned the Royal Irish Constabulary (RIC) barracks located on the Mullingar Road. The RIC then moved to the courthouse. In 1921, the IRA began a wave of burnings which targeted government offices throughout Ireland. This was a concerted effort to cripple the UK civil service in its day-to-day administration of the country. The Market House was also torched. Two sitting magistrates were kidnapped by the IRA on their way to the court. The men were held hostage locally, reportedly in a cow byre on the Hill of Moal. They were later released unharmed after forty eight hours, and the village was spared reprisals. The Market House was rebuilt in 1926 and served for periods as a fire station and a library.

Later additions to the built environment include multiple housing estates, the Area Office of the Westmeath County Council, and the Castlepollard Community College's new school building (2004), both on the Mullingar Road. In the 20 years between the 2002 and 2022 census, Castlepollard's population increased by more than 50%, from 895 to 1,349 inhabitants. The 2022 census indicated that approximately 30% of homes (158 of 526 households) were built between 2001 and 2010.

== Transport ==
While Bus Éireann route 111 (Cavan to Dublin via Trim) previously served Castlepollard, this is no longer the case. As of November 2024, route 111a (Cavan to Delvin via Granard) had a stop at Castlepollard. Route 447 also provides a link to Mullingar via Crookedwood on Thursdays only. The nearest rail service is at Mullingar railway station, approximately 22 km distant.

== Economy ==
Mergon International, a manufacturer of moulded parts, is one of the main businesses in the area. Castlepollard has number of retail outlets which serve a hinterland in the northern part of County Westmeath. This includes filling stations, one bank, a post office, council buildings, primary and secondary schools, a number of grocery/newsagent shops, hairdressers, beauty salons, drapery stores, furniture stores, pharmacies and a hardware store. Castlepollard also has number of pubs.

== Sport ==
Hurling is the major sport in the area. The local Gaelic Athletic Association (GAA) club, Castlepollard Hurling Club, has won the Westmeath Senior Hurling Championship on 14 occasions. The club's "arch-rivals", Lough Lene Gaels GAA, are based in neighbouring Collinstown.

Other local GAA clubs include Ballycomoyle (5 km (3 mi) away), who play in the Junior Gaelic football championship, and Castletown Finea Coole Whitehall (CFCW) (13 km (8 mi) away) plays in the Intermediate championship.

Castlepollard Celtic Football Club, an association football (soccer) club founded in 2004, fields teams ranging from Under 7s to Under 16s for boys and girls. In 2013, the club fielded a senior team in the Combined Counties Football League.

== Tullynally Castle ==
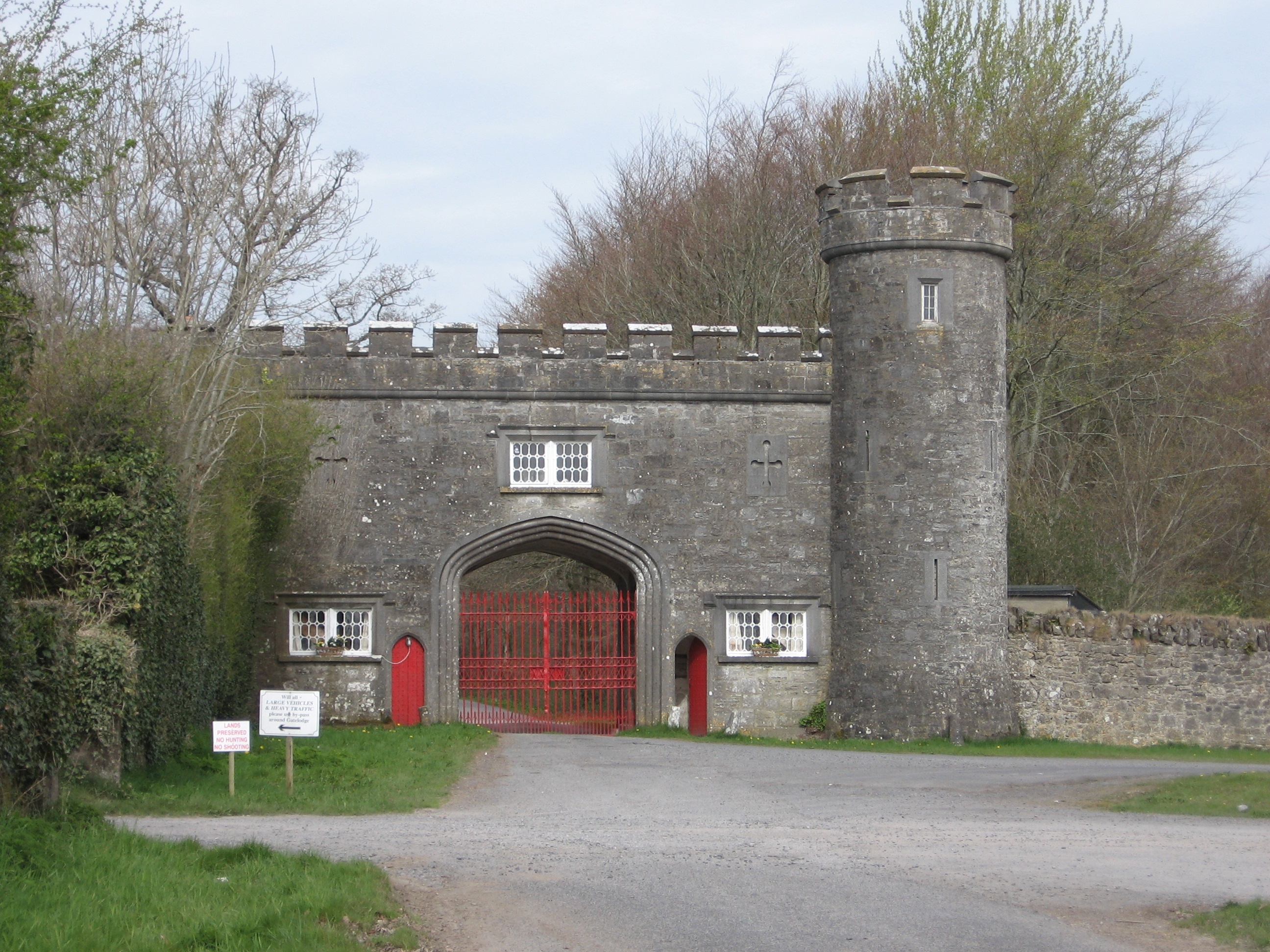
Front entrance of Tullynally Castle, Castlepollard.

Two kilometres west of Castlepollard on the Granard Road (Pakenham Hall Street) is Tullynally Castle, seat of the Pakenham family, later the Earls of Longford. Also known as Pakenham Hall, the original 17th-century fortified house (c. 1655) was remodelled first as a Georgian mansion in the 1730s, then as a large Gothic Revival castle. The castle was worked on by several well-known architects in the early-to-mid nineteenth-century, including Francis Johnston, James Shiel and Sir Richard Morrison.

A number of other structures are located on the grounds, including the gate lodge which fronts the Granard Road facing Castlepollard. The two-storey limestone building was designed c. 1820 by Shiel (a former clerk of Francis Johnston) whilst making renovations on the main house. An integral Tudor Gothic-arched carriage arch to the centre of the main body of the building and a single-bay three-storey tower on polygonal-plan attached to the north end of the main façade (east) form "a pleasing vista on a main road leading out of Castlepollard from the west and marks the start of a long tree-lined avenue to Tullynally Castle itself". It is currently in use as private residence.

The gardens, like the castle, are on a large scale, covering nearly 12 ha (29 1/2 acres). Terraced lawns around the castle overlook 18th century parkland. The adjoining woodland gardens and walled gardens date largely from the early 19th century and encompass a grotto of eroded limestone from nearby Lough Derravaragh and two ornamental lakes. The walled gardens have flower borders and an avenue of 200-year-old Irish yews. The gardens are open to the public in the spring and summer.

== See also ==
- List of towns and villages in Ireland
- Market Houses in Ireland
- Mullaghmeen, highest point in Westmeath
