= Crookedwood =

Crookedwood Tigh Munna
- Village
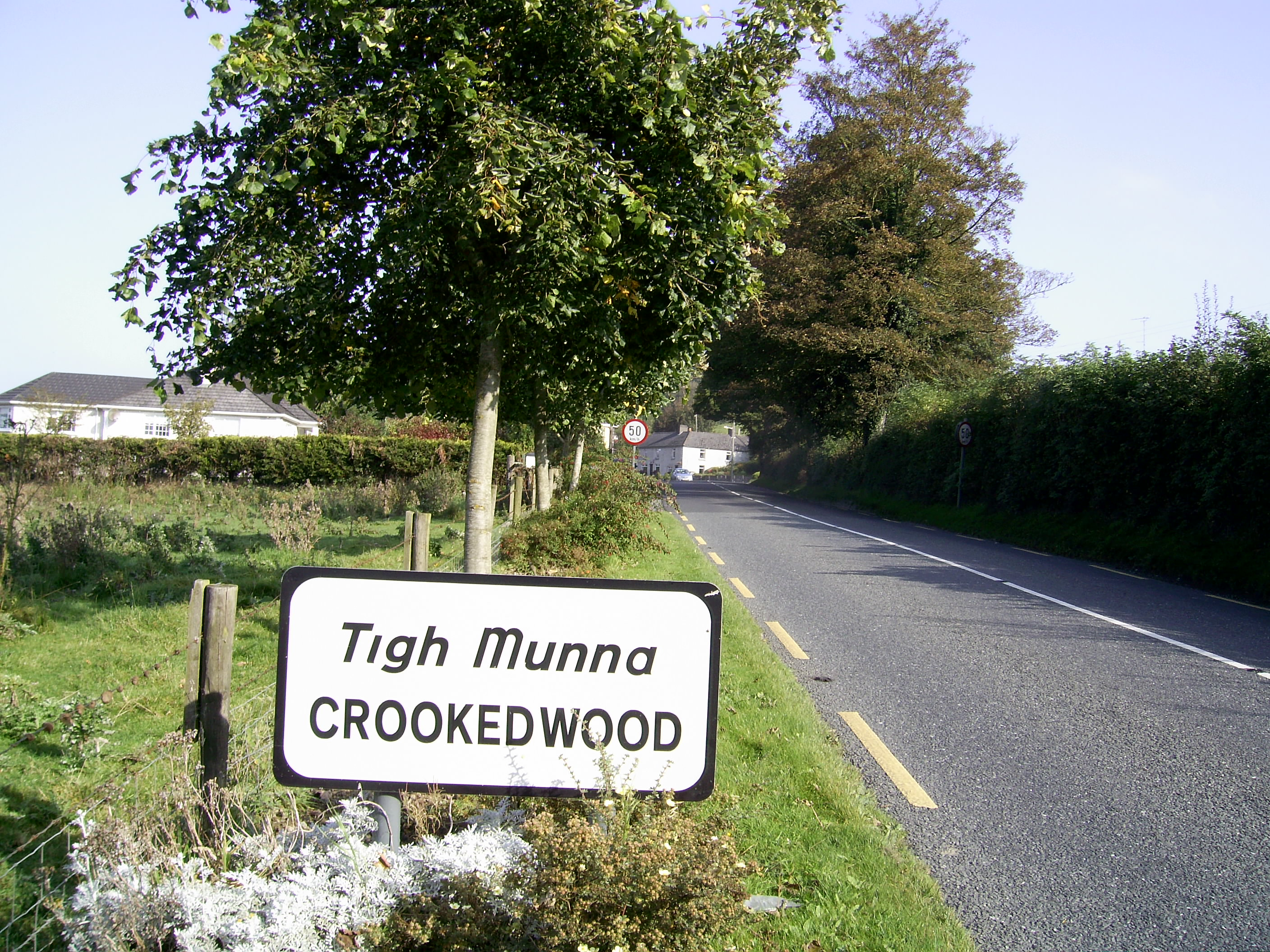
- Road signage on the approach to Crookedwood

- Location in Ireland
- Coordinates: 53°36′08″N 7°17′34″W
- Country: Ireland
- Province: Leinster
- County: County Westmeath
- Elevation: 118 m (387 ft)
- Time zone: UTC+0 (WET)
  - Summer (DST): UTC-1 (IST (WEST))
- Irish Grid Reference: N465616

Crookedwood (Irish: Tigh Munna) is a small village in County Westmeath on the R394 regional road. Historically it was called Taghmon (Irish: Tigh Munna), after the townland it occupies.

== Geography ==
Overlooked by the dominating hill of Knockeyon to the north, the village rests between the pine-covered hills as they roll down towards Lough Derravaragh, and located about 8 km north of Mullingar, at the south-eastern tip of the Lough.

Similar to Lough Lene, in Collinstown, the nearby Lough Derravaragh fishing interests are also promoted by the Crookedwood community.

== Transport ==
Local Link route 818 provides several services a day (not Sundays) to Mullingar, Castlepollard, Collinstown and other wayside locations. Bus Éireann route 447 provides a link to Mullingar and Finnea on Thursdays only. The nearest rail service can be accessed at Mullingar railway station approximately 11 km distant.

== Sport ==
The local hurling club, Crookedwood G.A.A, play in the Senior B division of the Westmeath hurling championship.

== See also ==
- List of towns in the Republic of Ireland
