= Ballymore GAA =

GAA club in Westmeath, Ireland

Ballymore
- Baile Mór
- Founded: 1884
- County: Westmeath
- Colours: Green and Gold
- Grounds: Ballymore
- Coordinates: 53.5°N 7.71°W

Playing kits
Standard colours

Ballymore GAA is a Gaelic Athletic Association club located in the town of Ballymore in County Westmeath, Ireland.

== History ==
The team has had some successes at Intermediate level, winning the Westmeath Intermediate Football Championship four times. The club reached the Westmeath Senior Football Championship final in 1965.
