= Turin Hurling Club =

Gaelic sports club in County Westmeath, Ireland

Turin
- Teamhairín
- Founded: 1923
- County: Westmeath
- Colours
- Grounds: McCabe Park

Playing kits
Standard colours

Senior Club Championships
	All Ireland	Leinster champions	Westmeath champions
Hurling:	0	0	0

Turin Hurling Club is a Gaelic Athletic Association club in Turin, County Westmeath, Ireland. The club is affiliated to the Westmeath County Board and is exclusively concerned with the game of hurling.

== History ==
Located in the village of Turin, roughly halfway between Mullingar and Delvin, Turin Hurling Club was founded in 1923, under the guidance of Larry Carey and Paddy Daly. The club has spent most of its existence operating in the junior grade, winning Westmeath JHC titles in 1957, 1965, 1975 and 1985. Turin secured senior status in 2026, after winning the Westmeath IHC title with a 0–19 to 1–09 win over Raharney in the final.

== Honours ==
- Westmeath Intermediate Hurling Championship (1): 2026
- Westmeath Junior Hurling Championship (4): 1957, 1965, 1975, 1985
