= Cullion GAA =

Gaelic Athletic Association club

Cullion
- An Chuilin
- Founded: 1949
- County: Westmeath
- Colours: Maroon and white

Playing kits
Standard colours

Cullion GAA is a Gaelic Athletic Association club located near Mullingar, County Westmeath, Ireland. The club is primarily concerned with the games of hurling and camogie.

== History ==
Located outside Mullingar, County Westmeath on the old Longford road, Cullion GAA club was founded in 1949 following the disbandment of the nearby Rathconnell club. Cullion was only two years in existence when they won their first Westmeath JHC title after defeating Castletown-Geoghegan in the final. By the late 1950s, Cullion had established themselves as a Westmeath SHC club. Cullion won the Feis Cup in 1964, which was their only success in senior competition until winning the Westmeath SBHC title in 2021.

== Honours ==
- Westmeath Senior B Hurling Championship (1): 2021
- Westmeath Intermediate Hurling Championship (3): 1996, 1999, 2019

== Notable players ==
- Jack Gillen
