= Westmeath Intermediate Hurling Championship =

Annual hurling competition for intermediate clubs in Westmeath

- Current season or competition: 2026 Westmeath Intermediate Hurling Championship
- Irish: Craobh Idirmheánach Iomána na hIarmhí
- Code: Hurling
- Founded: 1985; 41 years ago
- Region: Westmeath (GAA)
- Trophy: Adrian Murray Cup
- No. of teams: 6
- Title holders: Turin (1st title)
- Most titles: St Brigid's & St Oliver Plunkett's (6 titles)
- Sponsors: Slevin's Coaches
- Official website: Westmeath GAA

The Westmeath Intermediate Hurling Championship (known for sponsorship reasons as the Slevin's Coaches Westmeath Intermediate Hurling Championship and abbreviated to the Westmeath IHC) is an annual hurling competition organised by the Westmeath County Board of the Gaelic Athletic Association from 1985 for the third tier hurling teams in the county of Westmeath in Ireland.

In its current format, the Westmeath Intermediate Hurling Championship begins with a group stage. The six participating teams play each other in a round-robin system. The four top-ranking teams proceed to the knockout phase that culminates with the final match at TEG Cusack Park.

St Oliver Plunkett's is the most successful team in the tournament's history, having won it six times. Turin are the title holders after defeating Raharney by 0–19 to 1–09 in the 2026 final.

== History ==
The Westmeath Intermediate Championship was founded in 1985 in an effort to bridge the standard of play between the Westmeath Senior Championship and the Westmeath Junior Championship. For 35 years, the Westmeath Intermediate Championship was the second tier championship in the Westmeath hurling championship system.

A review of Westmeath's hurling championships in 2019 proposed that the Westmeath SHC and Westmeath IHC be restructured. This resulted in the creation of the Westmeath Senior B Hurling Championship. Each of the three championships would consist of six teams. The first championship following the restructuring featured the five teams who didn't make 2019 final, as well as the 2019 Westmeath JAHC winners who gained automatic promotion.

== Format ==
=== Group stage ===
Six clubs start in the group stage. Over the course of the group stage, each team plays once against the others in the group, resulting in each team being guaranteed five group games. Two points are awarded for a win, one for a draw and zero for a loss. The teams are ranked in the group stage table by points gained, then scoring difference and then their head-to-head record. The top three teams qualify for the knockout stage

=== Knockout stage ===
Semi-finals: The top four teams from the group stage contest this round.

Final: The two semi-final winner contests the final. The winning team are declared champions.

=== Qualification ===
At the end of the championship, the winning team qualify to the subsequent Leinster Junior Club Hurling Championship, the winner of which progresses to the All-Ireland Junior Club Hurling Championship.

== Teams ==
=== 2026 teams ===
The 6 teams competing in the 2026 Westmeath Intermediate Hurling Championship are:

Team	Championship titles	Last championship title
Castletown Geoghegan	1	2023
Clonkill	1	2020
Cullion	3	2019
Raharney	2	1988
Southern Gaels	1	1986
Turin	—	—

== Sponsorship ==
Slevin's Coaches had been providing sponsorship for a number of years before renewing their sponsorship of all Westmeath's hurling championships in July 2020.

== Trophy and medals ==
The Adrian Murray Cup is the current prize for winning the championship. It was commissioned to honour Adrian Murray, a member of the Crookedwood club who served in a number of administrative roles with the Westmeath County Board. He died in November 2006, at the age of 59..

== Roll of honour ==
#	Team	Wins	Years won
1	St Oliver Plunkett's	6	1994, 1998, 2001, 2004, 2016, 2021
1	St Brigid's	6	1995, 2000, 2009, 2011, 2014, 2025
3	Brownstown	5	1985, 2006, 2008, 2015, 2024
4	Ringtown	4	1997, 2002, 2013, 2022
5	Cullion	3	1996, 1999, 2019
5	Crookedwood	3	2005, 2012, 2018
9	Raharney	2	1987, 1988
9	Delvin	2	2003, 2010
11	Southern Gaels	1	1986
11	Castlepollard	1	2007
11	Fr Dalton's	1	2017
11	Clonkill	1	2020
11	Castletown Geoghegan	1	2023
11	Turin	1	2026

== List of finals ==
Year	Winners		Runners-up		Venue	#
Year	Club	Score	Club	Score	Venue	#
2026	Turin	0-19	Raharney	1-09	TEG Cusack Park	
2025	St Brigid's	2-14	Turin	1-15	TEG Cusack Park	
2024	Brownstown	6-17	Southern Gaels	3-8	TEG Cusack Park	
2023	Castletown Geoghegan	3-14	Clonkill	2-15	TEG Cusack Park	
2022	Ringtown	0-15	Raharney	1-09	TEG Cusack Park	
2021	St Oliver Plunkett's	1-18	Ringtown	1-11	TEG Cusack Park	
2020	Clonkill	1-13	Ringtown	1-10	TEG Cusack Park	
2019	Cullion	3-13, 1-13 (R)	Raharney	3-13, 1-12	TEG Cusack Park	
2018	Crookedwood	3-10, 0-16 (R)	Clonkill	1-16, 2-08	TEG Cusack Park	
2017	Fr Dalton's	1-11	Ringtown	1-07	TEG Cusack Park	

== See also ==
- Westmeath Senior Hurling Championship (Tier 1)
- Westmeath Senior B Hurling Championship (Tier 2)
- Westmeath Junior Hurling Championship (Tier 4)
