= Fr. Dalton's Hurling Club =

Hurling club in County Westmeath

Fr. Dalton's
- An tAthair Daltúin
- Founded: 1923
- County: Westmeath
- Colours: Green and Gold
- Grounds: Fr Dalton Park
- Coordinates: 53°29′54″N 7°39′40″W

Playing kits
Standard colours

Fr. Dalton's Hurling Club is a hurling club based in Ballymore, County Westmeath, Ireland.

== History ==
Father Dalton's was founded in 1923, and was named for Father Dalton, a Catholic priest who was martyred c. 1751 during the Penal era for saying Mass at a mass rock in the area.

The club is closely linked to the neighbouring Ballymore GAA, which play Gaelic football.

The adult hurling team lapsed between 1999 and 2008, when Fr Dalton's returned to the Westmeath Junior B Hurling Championship.

Fr Dalton's highest achievement was winning the Westmeath Senior B Hurling Championship in 2022 and 2024.

Fr Dalton Park was severely vandalised in 2023.

== Honours ==
=== Hurling ===
- Westmeath Senior B Hurling Championship (1): 2022, 2024
- Westmeath Intermediate Hurling Championship (1): 2017
- Westmeath Junior Hurling Championship (?): 1987
- Westmeath Junior B Hurling Championship (1): 2023
