= Delvin GAA =

GAA club in Delvin, County Westmeath, Ireland

Delvin
- Dealbhna Mór
- Founded: 1888
- County: Westmeath
- Nickname: The Valley
- Colours
- Grounds: Delvin GAA Grounds

Playing kits
Standard colours

Senior Club Championships
	All Ireland	Leinster champions	Westmeath champions
Hurling:	0	0	4

Delvin GAA is a Gaelic Athletic Association club in Delvin, County Westmeath, Ireland. The club is primarily concerned with the game of hurling, but also fields teams in Gaelic football.

== History ==
Located in the village of Delvin, close to the Meath-Westmeath border, Delvin GAA Club was founded in 1888. That year, the club was involved in the very first Gaelic football match to take place in Westmeath. Hurling later became the dominant sport in the club.

Arguably, Delvin's most successful hurling period occurred between 1949 and 1953 when the club won four Westmeath SHC titles. A period of decline followed after these successes, with Delvin's hurling team eventually being relegated to the junior grade. In spite of this, the club's Gaelic footballers claimed the Westmeath JAFC title in 1989.

Delvin returned to hurling's top tier once again when, in 2003, the club won the Westmeath IHC title. A second Westmeath IHC title followed in 2010. Delvin won the Westmeath SBHC title in 2025, after beating St Oliver Plunkett's by 1-25 to 0-23 in a final replay.

== Honours ==
- Westmeath Senior Hurling Championship (4): 1949, 1950, 1951, 1953
- Westmeath Senior B Hurling Championship (1): 2025
- Westmeath Intermediate Hurling Championship (2): 2003, 2010
- Westmeath Junior A Football Championship (1): 1989
