= St Brigid's GAA (Westmeath) =

St Brigid's
- Naomh Bríd
- Founded: 1957
- County: Westmeath
- Colours: Yellow and white
- Grounds: Dalystown

Playing kits
Standard colours

Senior Club Championships
	All Ireland	Leinster champions	Westmeath champions
Hurling:	0	0	4

St Brigid's GAA is a Gaelic Athletic Association club located in Dalystown, County Westmeath, Ireland. The club is primarily concerned with the game of hurling.

== History ==
St Brigid's Hurling Club was founded in 1954 but didn't affiliate to the Westmeath County Board until 1957. Senior status was secured for the first time after the Westmeath JHC title was won in 1964. After winning their first Westmeath SHC title in 1968, the club won three successive titles from 1970 to 1972.

A Westmeath SBHC title was won in 1979. St Brigid's regraded to the newly restructured Westmeath IHC in 1994 and went on to claim five titles over the following 20 seasons. In 2025 they won the Westmeath IHC beating Turin Hurling Club in the final.

== Honours ==
- Westmeath Senior Hurling Championship (4): 1968, 1970, 1971, 1972
- Westmeath Senior B Hurling Championship (1): 1979
- Westmeath Intermediate Hurling Championship (6): 1995, 2000, 2009, 2011, 2014, 2025
