= Brownstown Hurling Club =

Brownstown
- Baile an Bhrúnaigh
- Founded: 1922
- County: Westmeath
- Colours: Blue and white
- Grounds: Fr O'Reilly Memorial Park
- Coordinates: 53°39′45″N 7°06′29″W

Playing kits
Standard colours

Senior Club Championships
	All Ireland	Leinster champions	Westmeath champions
Hurling:	0	0	15

Brownstown Hurling Club is a Gaelic Athletic Association club in Archerstown, County Westmeath, Ireland. The club is exclusively concerned with the game of hurling.

== History ==
Located in the parish of Delvin, on the Meath-Westmeath border, Brownstown Hurling Club was founded in 1922. The club won its first Westmeath SHC title in 1938. Brownstown regularly contested finals over the following 15 years and had won six SHC titles in total by 1952. Emigration had a big impact following this success, which resulted in the club amalgamating with Delvin in 1966.

After the club was reformed in 1968, Brownstown went on to win the Westmeath JHC title in 1970. The club also had success at underage level with back-to-back Westmeath MAHC titles being claimed in 1973 and 1974. After a 25-year absence, the Westmeath SHC title once again returned to Brownstown in 1977. This victory began a new era of dominance for the club. Brownstown's 11th SHC title in 1985 saw them lead the all-time toll of honour for the first time. The club won their 15th and final SHC title in 1993 after a defeat of Castletown Geoghegan in the final.

== Honours ==
- Westmeath Senior Hurling Championship (15): 1938, 1943, 1946, 1947, 1948, 1952, 1977, 1978, 1981, 1983, 1985, 1988, 1989, 1991, 1993
- Westmeath Intermediate Hurling Championship (5): 1985, 2006, 2008, 2015, 2024
- Westmeath Junior Hurling Championship (?): 1970, 1979, 1980

== Notable players ==
- Pat Clancy: All-Ireland SBHC-winner (1991)
