= Ringtown GAA =

Ringtown
- Baile na Rinne
- Founded: 1902
- County: Westmeath
- Colours: Green and yellow
- Grounds: Milltown

Playing kits
Standard colours

Senior Club Championships
	All Ireland	Leinster champions	Westmeath champions
Hurling:	0	0	9

Ringtown GAA is a Gaelic Athletic Association club located outside Castlepollard, County Westmeath, Ireland. The club is primarily concerned with the game of hurling.

== History ==
Located outside Castlepollard, County Westmeath, Ringtown Hurling Club was founded in 1902. The club has spent most of its existence operating at senior level, however, it currently participates in the intermediate grade. Ringtown won the first of its nine Westmeath SHC titles in 1906, with the last being claimed in 1987.

== Honours ==
- Westmeath Senior Hurling Championship (9): 1906, 1908, 1910, 1915, 1916, 1917, 1942, 1980, 1987
- Westmeath Intermediate Hurling Championship (3): 1997, 2002, 2013, 2022

== Notable players ==
- David Kilcoyne: All-Star-winner (1986)
