= St Oliver Plunkett's GAA (Westmeath) =

St Oliver Plunkett's
- Oilibhéar Pluincéad Naofa
- Founded: 1976
- County: Westmeath
- Colours: White & Green
- Grounds: Mullingar

Playing kits
Standard colours

Senior Club Championships
	All Ireland	Leinster champions	Westmeath champions
Hurling:	0	0	0

St Oliver Plunkett's Hurling Club is a Gaelic Athletic Association club located in Mullingar, County Westmeath, Ireland. The club is solely concerned with the game of hurling.

== History ==
Located in the town of Mullingar, County Westmeath, St Oliver Plunkett's Hurling Club was founded on 5 April 1976. The club has spent most of its existence operating in the lower grades, winning five Westmeath IHC between 1994 and 2016. A brief period in the Westmeath SHC saw the club lose to Castletown Geoghegan in the 2013 final. St Oliver Plunkett's defeated Ringtown by 2–21 to 0–10 to win the Westmeath SBHC title in 2023.

== Honours ==
- Leinster Junior Club Hurling Championship (1): 2001
- Westmeath Senior B Hurling Championship (2): 2023, 2026
- Westmeath Intermediate Hurling Championship (6): 1994, 1998, 2001, 2004, 2016, 2021

== Notable players ==
- Aaron Craig: Joe McDonagh Cup-winner (2021)
