= Lough Lene (disambiguation) =

Lough Lene may be one of the following:

- Lough Lene, a limestone fresh water lake dating to pre-Christian, pre-Roman period times.
- Lough Leane, another lake in county Kerry, frequently be confused with Lough Lene Westmeath.
- Lough Lene Gaels, a local Gaelic athletic association sports club from north Westmeath.
- Lough Lene Boat, a unique boat construction of pre-Christian, early Roman times discovered in Sept. 1968 .
