= Dale River (Boyne) =

River in Ireland

Physical characteristics
- Source
  - location: Counties Westmeath and Meath

The Dale River is a river that flows through counties Westmeath and Meath, Ireland. The river's source is at Lough Lene, it then flows for 19 miles before meeting the River Boyne, meeting it near the town of Clonard, County Meath.
