= Lough Lene Boat =

Underwater archeological artifact in Ireland

The Lough Lene Boat, also known as The Monks' Boat, is an underwater archaeological artifact from prehistoric Ireland. It was discovered in 1968 on the east side of Lough Lene, County Westmeath nearest to the Cummerstown/Windtown townlands of Collinstown. Radiocarbon dating revealed that the boat was constructed sometime between the 1st and 4th century.

== Discovery ==
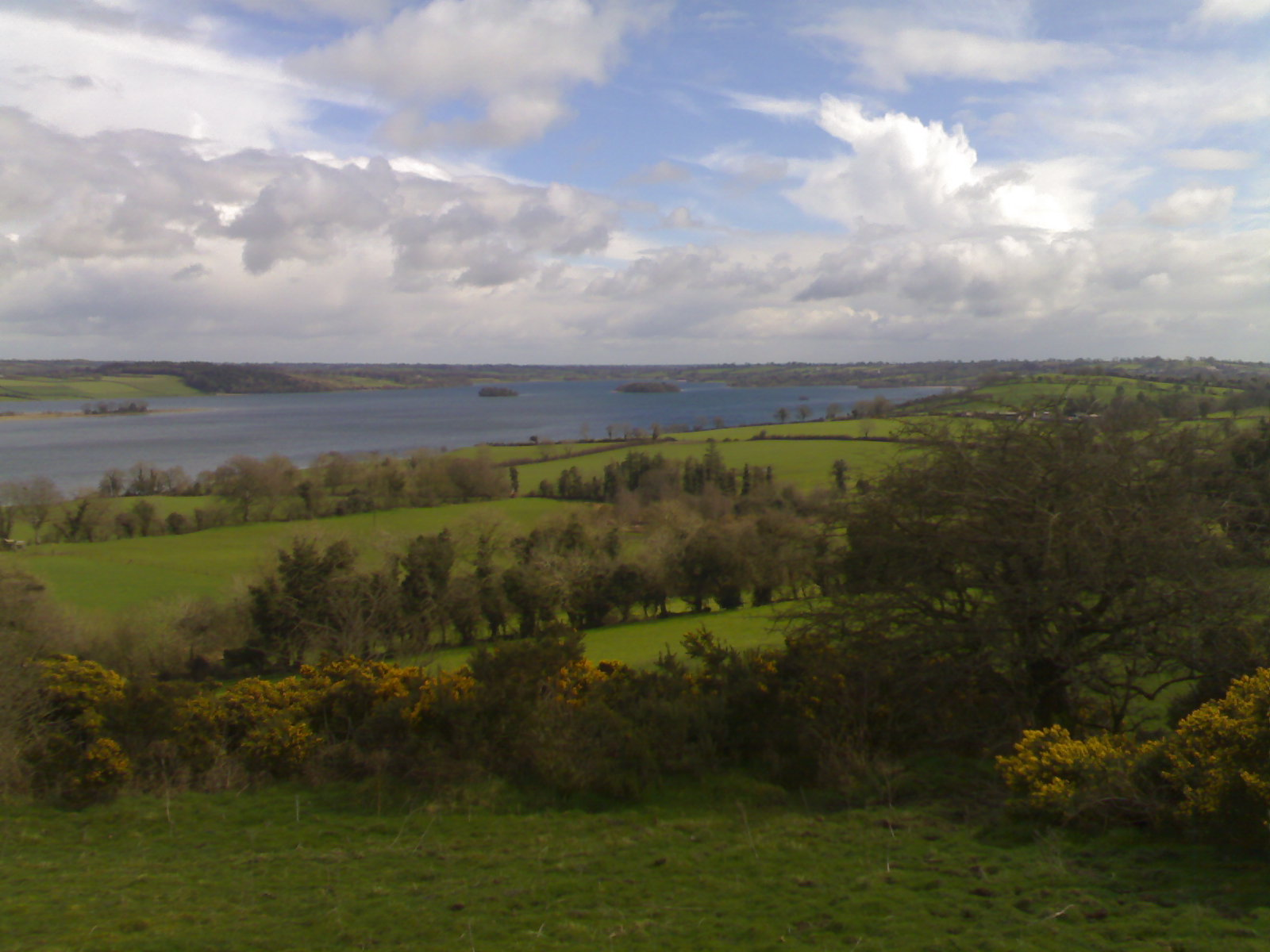
Nuns Island, a site popularly associated with the history of the Lough Lene Boat, is visible in this photo of Lough Lene shows. Turgesius Island and the Castle Isles are also visible. The mainland is in the foreground.

The boat, which resembled a "dug out canoe", was discovered by divers belonging to the local Mullingar Sub Aqua Club. The divers moved the boat into shallower water and then, on 28 September 1968, brought it ashore for examination by experts.

== Characteristics ==
P. O hEailidhe from the National Museum of Ireland reported:

"the Lough Lene boat combines techniques of sewn boat construction together with that of mortise-and-tenon in a way which cannot be paralleled elsewhere at present."

== Legend ==
"The Monks' Boat" appellation comes from a 20th century local tradition that associates the boat with the monks of the ruined Fore Abbey. Although the boat pre-dates the abbey by several centuries, it is thought that the boat may have been sunk while moving religious artifacts used during mass in the Fore Abbey and on the convent on Nuns Island. Another legend holds that locals, believing the boat cursed with bad fortune, did not wish the boat recovered.

Because of theories about a possible Romano-British origin for the Lough Lene Boat, some have even speculated a connection between the vessel and St. Patrick. According to the Annals of Ulster (a late medieval document in which dates, especially of earlier events, are suspect) the era of St. Patrick's life coincides with scientific estimation of when the boat was constructed.

== The Lough Lene Bell ==
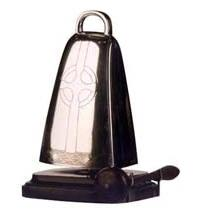
Lough Lene Bell

In 1882, the Royal Irish Academy was presented with the Bell of Lough Lene by the Barbavila estate proprietor, Mr. William Barlow Smythe. The bell had been discovered the previous year in Lough Lene by a boy fishing for eels on Castle Island, which was owned by Smythe at the time.

Given the close proximity to the Fore Abbey, the estate owner Smythe concluded that the bell possibly belonged to the St Feichin Abbey; During the Viking and Anglo-Norman oppressions, it may have been transferred to Nun's Island, before being eventually being hidden upon Castle Island.

The Bell has a faint outline of the Christian Celtic cross upon opposing sides of the bell and an ornamental periphiral border. Smythe pronounced that ornamentation was generally reserved for the cases or shrines for that era and was therefore most unusual. The bell appears similar to two other bells from that early Christian period. These had been found in Bangor, County Down in the year 1832, and another in Cashel, County Tipperary in 1849. Smythe, the Barbavila owner, believed that the Lough Lene Bell was contemporary to these bells which were believed to be from the 7th century, therefore supporting his theory that it was possible that it could have been a relic of St. Feichins. The Folklore Commission also hold an account of Kit "the Blade" Fagan's discovery of the bell, which consequentially triggered a local treasure hunt for further artifacts around Collinstown and Fore.

While the original Lough Lene Bell remains within the National Museum, a half sized replica holds a place of pride as the Ceann Comhairle's Bell in Dáil Éireann. This replica was presented to the Dáil in 1931 by the widow of Major Bryan Cooper, a former member of the House.
