= Fore, County Westmeath =

Village in County Westmeath, Ireland

Fore Baile Fhobhair
- Village
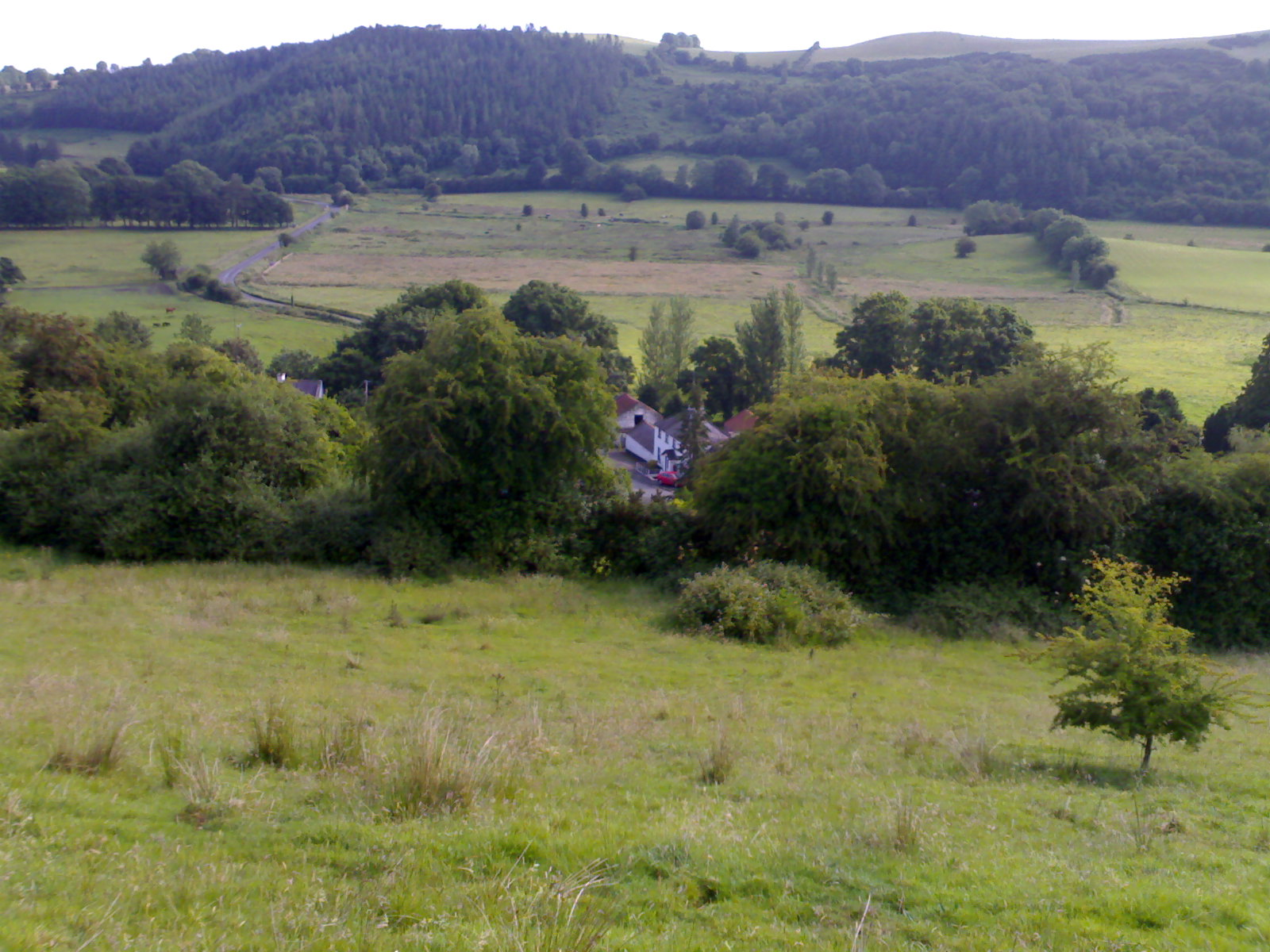

- Location in Ireland
- Coordinates: 53°40′54″N 7°13′37″W
- Country: Ireland
- Province: Leinster
- County: County Westmeath
- Elevation: 101 m (331 ft)
- Time zone: UTC+0 (WET)
  - Summer (DST): UTC-1 (IST (WEST))

Fore (Irish: Baile Fhobhair, meaning 'Townland of the Spring') is a village, next to the old Benedictine Abbey ruin of Fore Abbey, situated to the north of Lough Lene in County Westmeath, in Ireland. The nearest town is Castlepollard, 5 km to the west.

The village (sister parish of nearby St. Mary's Collinstown) is situated within a valley between two hills: the Hill of Ben, the Hill of Houndslow, and the Ankerland rise area. There can be found the ruins of a Christian monastery, which had been populated at one time by French Benedictine monks from Évreux, Normandy.

Fore is the anglicised version of the Irish name that signifies "the town of the water-springs" and was given to the area after Saint Feichin’s spring or well, which is next to the old church a short distance from where the ruined monastery still stands. It was St. Feichin who founded the ancient Fore Abbey around 630. By 665 (the time of the yellow plague) there were 300 monks living in the community.

Another important aspect of Fore is the Fore Crosses one of which is in the village of Fore. There are 18 crosses; some crosses are plain (most likely to wind and rain erosion) whilst others still remain carved. These are spread out over 7 miles on roadways and in fields and bore witness to religious persecution during penal times.

The Monk Gerald of Wales related the following legend of Féchín:

" Chapter LII (Of the mill which no women enter)

"There is a mill at Foure, in Meath, which St. Fechin made most miraculously with his own hands, in the side of a certain rock. No women are allowed to enter either this mill or the church of the saint; and the mill is held in as much reverence by the natives as any of the churches dedicated to the saint. It happened that when Hugh de Lacy was leading his troops through this place, an archer dragged a girl into the mill and there violated her. Sudden punishment overtook him; for being struck with infernal fire in the offending parts, it spread throughout his whole body, and he died the same night".
