= IrAlCo =

IrAlCo may refer to:

- Iranian Aluminium Company
- Irish Aluminium Company, established in 1964 by Franz Pol in Collinstown North Westmeath
