= Collinstown =

Village in County Westmeath, Ireland

Collinstown Baile na gCailleach
- Village
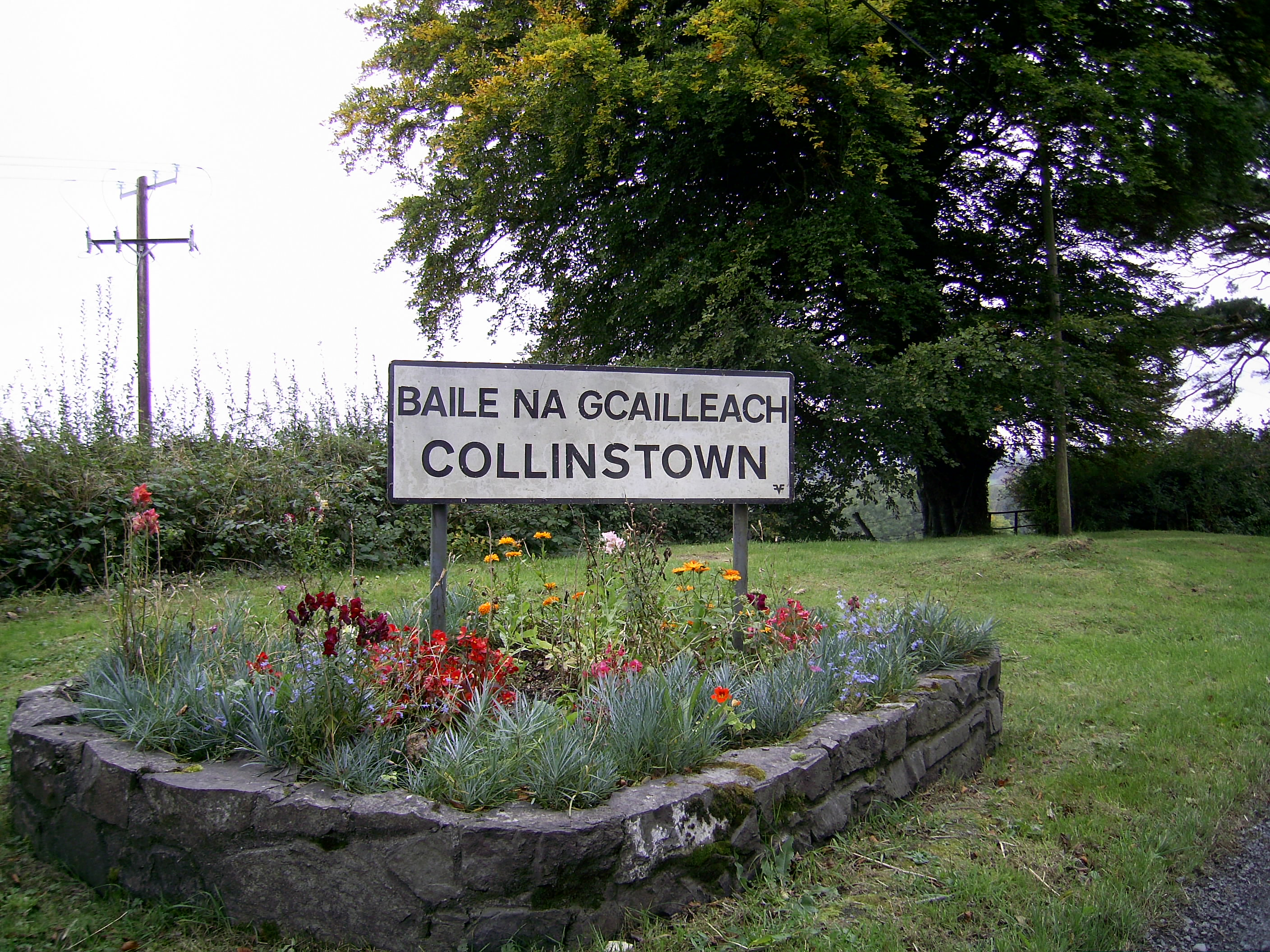
- Bilingual welcome signage

- Location in Ireland
- Coordinates: 53°38′50″N 7°12′39″W
- Country: Ireland
- Province: Leinster
- County: Westmeath
- Elevation: 128 m (420 ft)

Population (2016)
  - Total: 356
- Time zone: UTC+0 (WET)
  - Summer (DST): UTC-1 (IST (WEST))
- Irish Grid Reference: N500673

Collinstown (Irish: Baile na gCailleach) is a village in north County Westmeath, situated on the R395 regional road overlooking Lough Lene. It lies 18 km (11 mi) northeast of the county town of Mullingar and (as of the 2016 census) had a population of 356.

== Toponymy ==
The Irish name of the village means 'town of the veiled women', or 'town of the hags', owing to a convent once established on an island on nearby Lough Lene.

== History ==
Collinstown has been an inhabited area since pre-Christian times. West of the village, in the townland of Ranaghan, are the remains of several ringforts. At least one of these is attributed to the Viking chief Turgesius, who is said to have conquered Dublin. Turgesius built them on high ground overlooking Lough Lene for defensive purposes and dwelled there before being killed by Máel Sechnaill mac Maíl Ruanaid, the High King of Ireland. In addition to this fort, Turgesius also had another upon the largest island of Lough Lene which still today bears his name, Turgesius Island.

The area also contains ancient burial-grounds associated with St Colman who was responsible for seven early Christian mass paths by which pilgrims travelled on foot through fields to Sunday mass, dating from the penal times.

Collinstown also has historic links with several religious orders: as well as a convent being established on Nun's Island, Lough Lene, to the north is the monastic complex of Fore Abbey.

== Lough Lene Bell ==
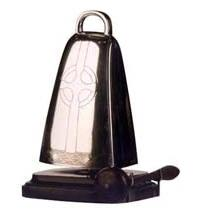
Lough Lene Bell replica

In 1881 an ancient bell was found by a boy fishing for eels on Castle Island in Lough Lene, part of the Barbavila estate owned by William Barlow Smythe. In 1882 Smythe presented this "Lough Lene Bell" to the Royal Irish Academy. Given the proximity to Fore Abbey, Smythe concluded that the bell possibly belonged to the St Feichin Abbey. During the Viking and Anglo-Norman oppressions, it may have been transferred to Nun's Island, before eventually being hidden upon Castle Island.

The bell has a faint outline of the Christian Celtic cross upon opposing sides and has an ornamental peripheral border. Smythe pronounced that ornamentation was generally reserved for the cases or shrines for that era and was therefore most unusual. The bell appears similar to two other bells from that early Christian period. These had been found in Bangor, County Down in the year 1832, and another in Cashel, County Tipperary in 1849.

Smythe, the Barbavila owner, believed that the Lough Lene Bell was contemporary to these other 7th-century bells, supporting his theory that it was possible that it could have been a relic of St. Feichins.

While the original bell remains within the National Museum, a half sized replica holds a place of pride as the Ceann Comhairle's bell in Dáil Éireann. This replica was presented to the Dáil in 1931 by the widow of Major Bryan Cooper, a former member of the House. In recent years, yet another replica has been cast from the mold of this bell and is on display in St Mary's (Roman Catholic) Church in Collinstown and also St Feichin's church in Fore.

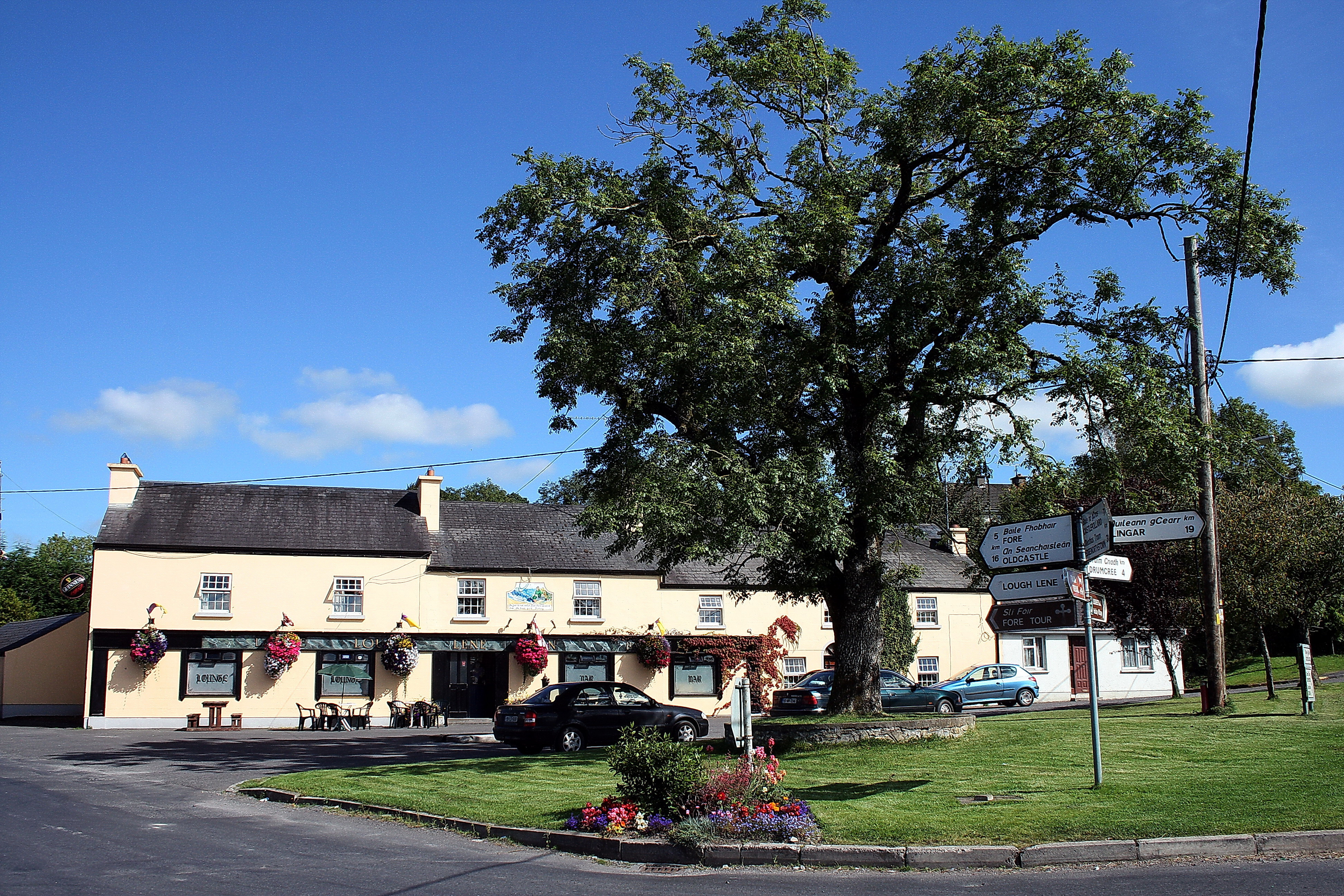
Lough Lene Inn

== Barbavilla Estate ==
William Smyth, Dean of Dromore and Bishop of Kilmore purchased the Ranaghan estate, later known as Barbavilla in 1670 from the 4th Viscount Fitzwilliam of Merrion and others for £1,100. The estate had formerly belonged to the Luttrell family, who had forfeited it for their part in the civil wars of the 1640s. William Smyths third son William (1692–1769) inherited the estate from his father and named the house he built on it c.1730 Barbavilla, after his wife Barbara (née Ingoldsby).

During the nineteenth century the Barbavila House and Estate provided employment in the area. Houses, farm buildings and animal dwellings were built from stone for employees throughout the immediate surroundings of Barbavilla in and around Collinstown. These stone houses, the old school, and farm buildings are protected through local heritage conservation laws. A feature of these buildings is the roofing tile baked from local red colored clay, which was manufactured within the Barbavilla estate. Some of these remaining buildings are identified by the small moss-green circles.

Since 1964, Barbavilla has been home to the Irish Aluminium Company (Iralco), a company that manufactures automotive parts for major European car companies. In 2008, the company changed hands and was renamed as C&F Automotive. It was subsequently bought-out by former members of the original Iralco factory and now operates as Decotek Automotive.

== Sport ==
Lough Lene Gaels, the local hurling club, was founded in 1969 as a result of an amalgamation between the Collinstown, Fore, Glenidan and Rickardstown hurling clubs. The club has won the Westmeath Senior Hurling Championship on seven occasions since 1975. The Gaels have a local rivalry with neighbouring side Castlepollard GAA.

Bathing, sailing, wind-surfing, authorized fishing, and jetty facilities are available at the Lough Lene access point named locally as "The Cut" about 2 km north of the village.

There is also a local pitch and putt club.

== Education ==
Scoil Mhuire Naisiúnta (St Mary's N.S.) is the local primary school.

== See also ==
- List of towns and villages in Ireland
