= Irish Aluminium Company =

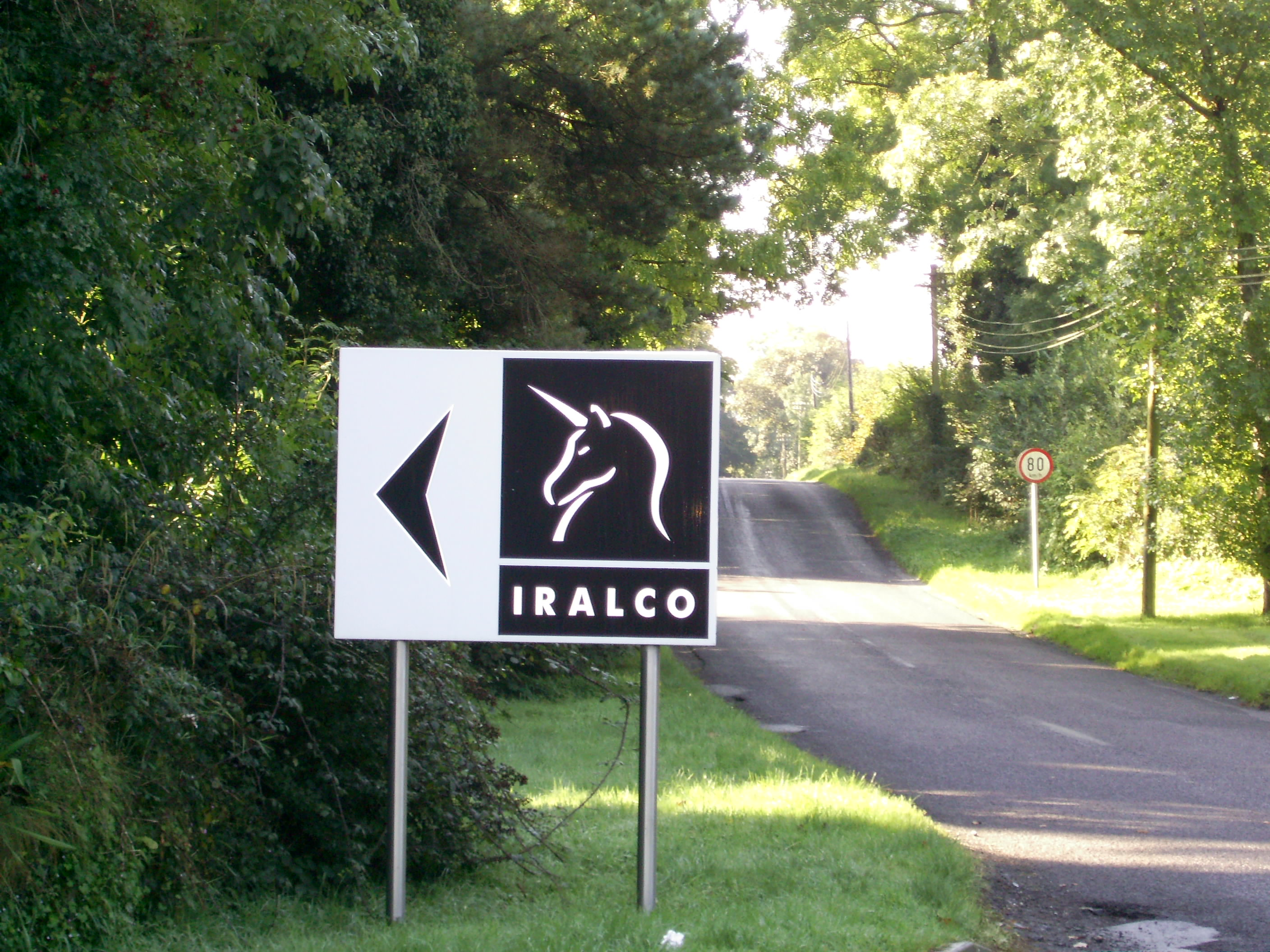
Old Irish Aluminium Company signage at the plant's Mullingar Road entrance

Iralco or the Irish Aluminium Company is the former name of a car parts manufacturer situated in Collinstown, County Westmeath in Ireland. The company was initially established in 1964 by Franz Pohl, a German entrepreneur.

As of 2008, it was producing components for a number of car manufacturers in Europe, including Audi, Bentley, Ford, Volkswagen and Volvo.

In August 2008, the company was taken over by C&F Automotive Limited, and in 2018 was sold to Decotek Automotive Limited. At the time of the 2018 sale, it had approximately 390 employees.

As of 2023, Decotek Automotive still had operations in Collinstown.
