= Castledaly =

Village in County Westmeath, Ireland

Castledaly Caisleán Uí Dhálaigh
- Village
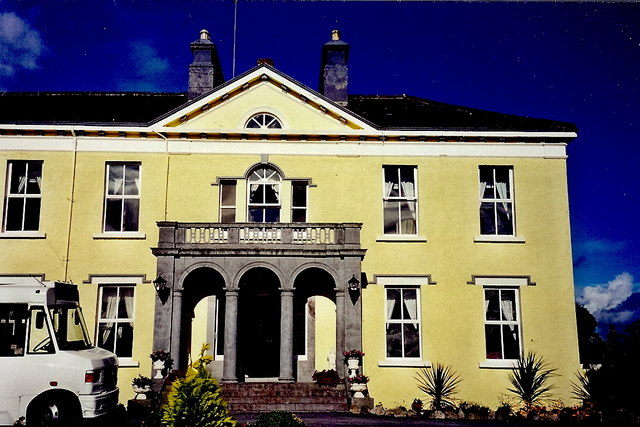
- Castledaly Manor, built around 1780, is now a Christian Camp and Conference Centre

- Location in Ireland
- Coordinates: 53°22′34″N 7°47′31″W
- Country: Ireland
- Province: Leinster
- County: County Westmeath

Government
  - Dáil Éireann: Longford–Westmeath
- Time zone: UTC+0 (WET)
  - Summer (DST): UTC-1 (IST (WEST))
- Irish grid reference: N134361

Castledaly (Irish: Caisleán Uí Dhálaigh) is a village and electoral district in County Westmeath, Ireland. It is 5 km southwest of Moate and 11 km east of Athlone, on the R444 road.

== Village ==
Castledaly village consists of a church, community centre, pub, GAA pitch and walking track and a children's playground. Castledaly Manor, a nearby Georgian stately home built around 1780, is now used as a Christian Camp and Conference Centre. The local national (primary) school, Kilcleagh National School, had approximately 100 pupils enrolled as of 2020. The village has a Tidy Towns committee.

== See also ==
- List of towns and villages in Ireland
