= Fore Abbey =

Ruined Benedictine monastery in Westmeath, Ireland

- Mainistir Fhobhair
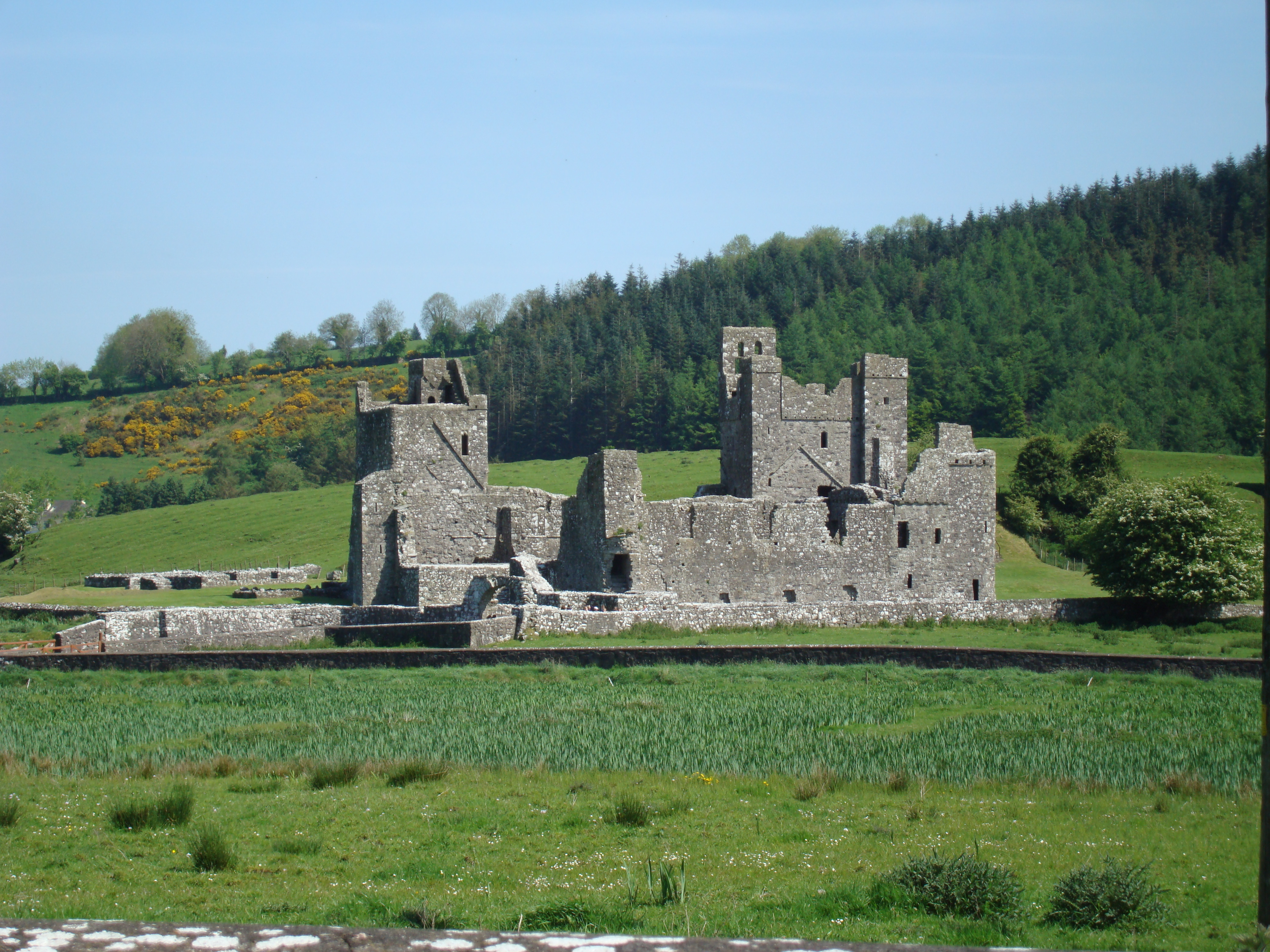

Monastery information
- Order: Benedictines
- Established: 630 CE
- Disestablished: 27 November 1539
- Diocese: Meath

People
- Founder(s): Féichín
- Important associated figures: Hugh de Lacy, Lord of Meath

Architecture
- Status: Inactive
- Style: Romanesque

Site
- Location: North of Lough Lene, County Westmeath
- Coordinates: 53.683902°N 7.227311°W
- Visible remains: abbey, hermitage, town gates
- Public access: yes

National monument of Ireland
- Official name: Fore Abbey & Fore town gates
- Reference no.: 215 & 220

Fore Abbey (Irish: Mainistir Fhobhair) is the ruins of a Benedictine and Early Gaelic 7th century Abbey with associated Mill, Anchorite's Cell, Holy Wells and a structure associated with St. Féichín, all situated to the north of Lough Lene in County Westmeath, adjacent to Fore village. Architectural additions, damage by fire and dismantlement have altered the site's appearance and layout over the centuries.

== A Gaelic Monastery ==
The abbey was founded in the 7th century by Saint Féichín in 630 CE. It functioned for over 400 years until it was re-founded by de Lacy in around 1200 as a cell of the Abbey of Évreux, now Évreux Cathedral in France as the 'Abbey of SS. Féichín & Taurinus OB'. Fore is the anglicised version of the Irish "Fobhair", meaning "water-springs". The name is derived from St. Féichín's spring or well which is next to the 'old church' (7th century Irish church with cellae), a short distance from the ruined later monastery. The site is referenced in the Annals of Inisfallen (AI) as "Repose of Fechtnach of Fobar". The Ó Cibhleacháin clan were recorded as the coarbs of the Monastery at Fore.

- By the time of St. Féichín's death in 665 he had attracted about 300 monks to his community.
- Between 771 and 1169 Fore Abbey was burnt 12 times by pillaging invaders, such as the Viking Lord Turgesius based at Lough Lene and his fort on Randoon, between Collinstown and modern Castlepollard; and the O'Reilly Lords of Breifne (modern Cavan) as the power of the Gaelic kings of Meath waned in 1169.
- A small 'high cross' in solid masonry was set up at the original entrance to the site possibly in the 10th century

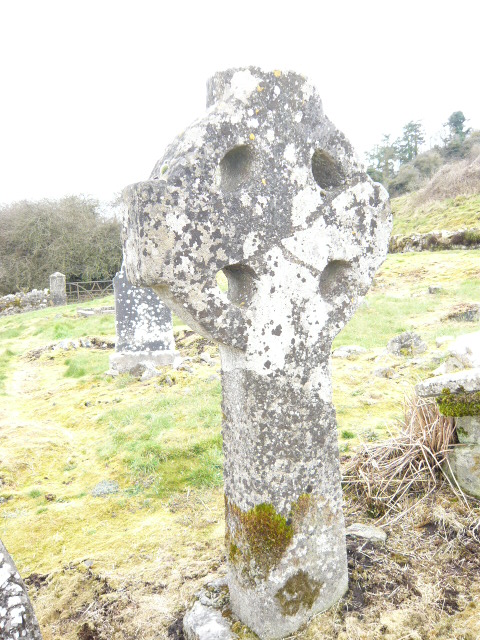

- By 1200, the Gaelic Abbey was secularized
- The 'old church' (7th century) had a chancel added in the 13th century
- In the boundary arch between the original structure and the chancel, an effigy of a monk - though possibly a Sheela-na-gig - is set into the arch.

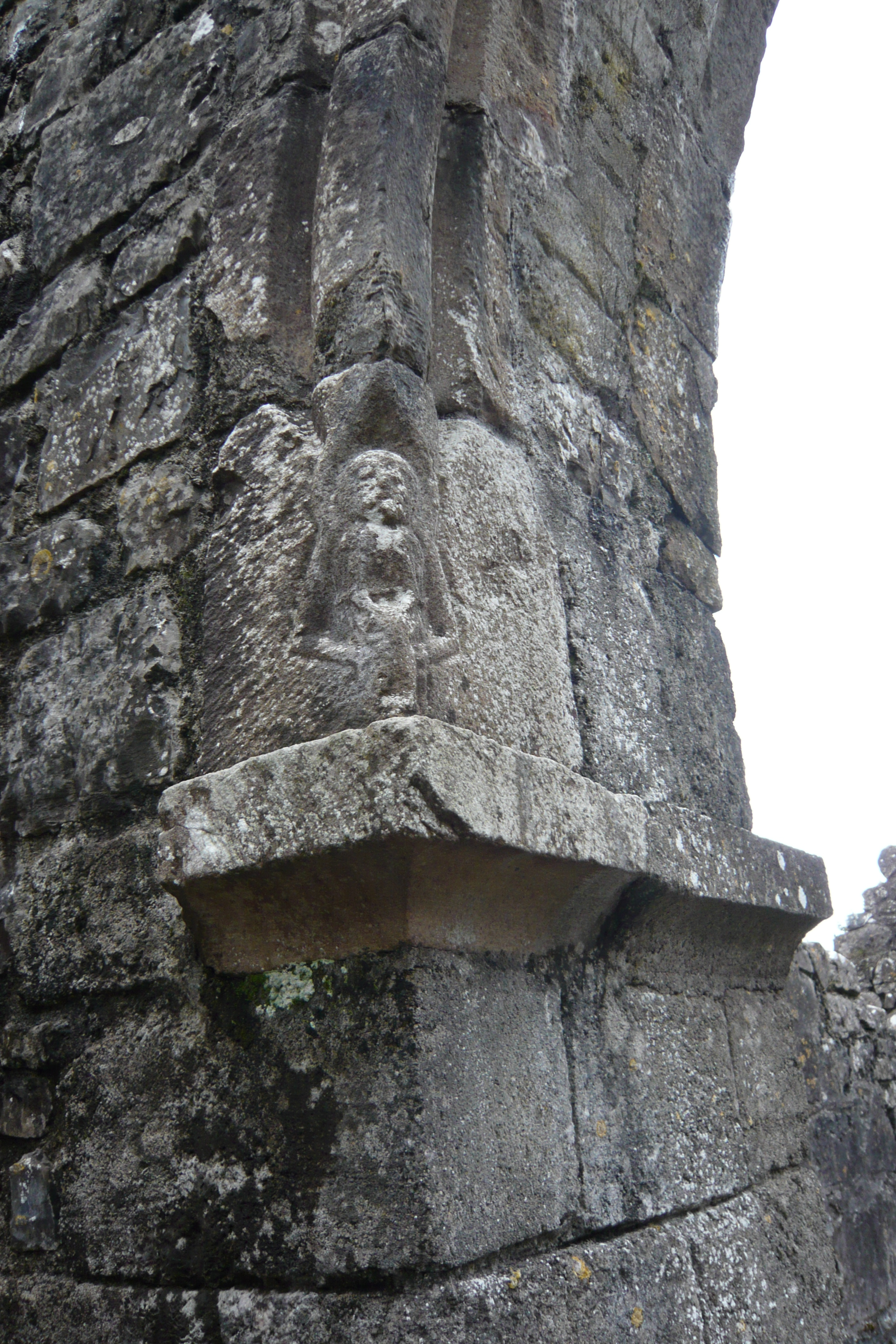

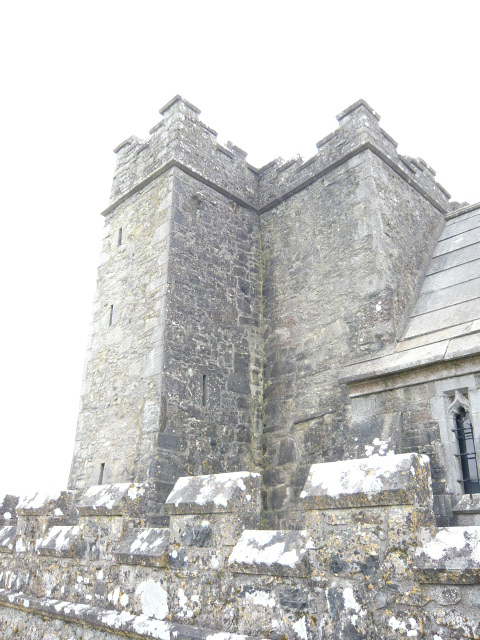

== A Benedictine Priory ==
In the 13th century Hugh de Lacy, Lord of Meath had built a Benedictine priory in the valley near the Gaelic Monastery. Many of the buildings that remain today (in ruins) are from the 13th and 15th century and have been restored throughout the 20th century, making Fore Abbey and environs one of the largest group of Benedictine ruins and ecclesiastical landscape to have sojourned and remained in Ireland. This priory was dedicated to both St Féichín and St Taurin, of Évreux, founder of the parent monastery in France. As a cell of a foreign or 'alien' house in the 13th century, the English Crown held the lands and manor owned by the when the English and French were at war with each other.

- Its 13th century church still has some painted plaster decorations in the church and graceful arcaded cloister.
- Attached to the church are the broken walls of two towers, where the monks once lived, and the de Lacy vassal Richard de Tuite held an apartment
- In spite of assertions to holding huge numbers of monks and students, Medieval Fore Priory never had any more than a handful of monks under a prior, who were most likely drawn from the Anglo-Norman aristocracy, if not 'French' in origin.

== Seven Wonders of Fore ==
The abbey is also noted for what locals call the "Seven Wonders":

1. The monastery built upon the bog.
2. The mill without a race (St. Fechin reportedly induced water to flow from the ground and operate a mill that had no visible water supply - in reality water from Lough Lene flows through the ground). Photo: St. Féichín's Mill
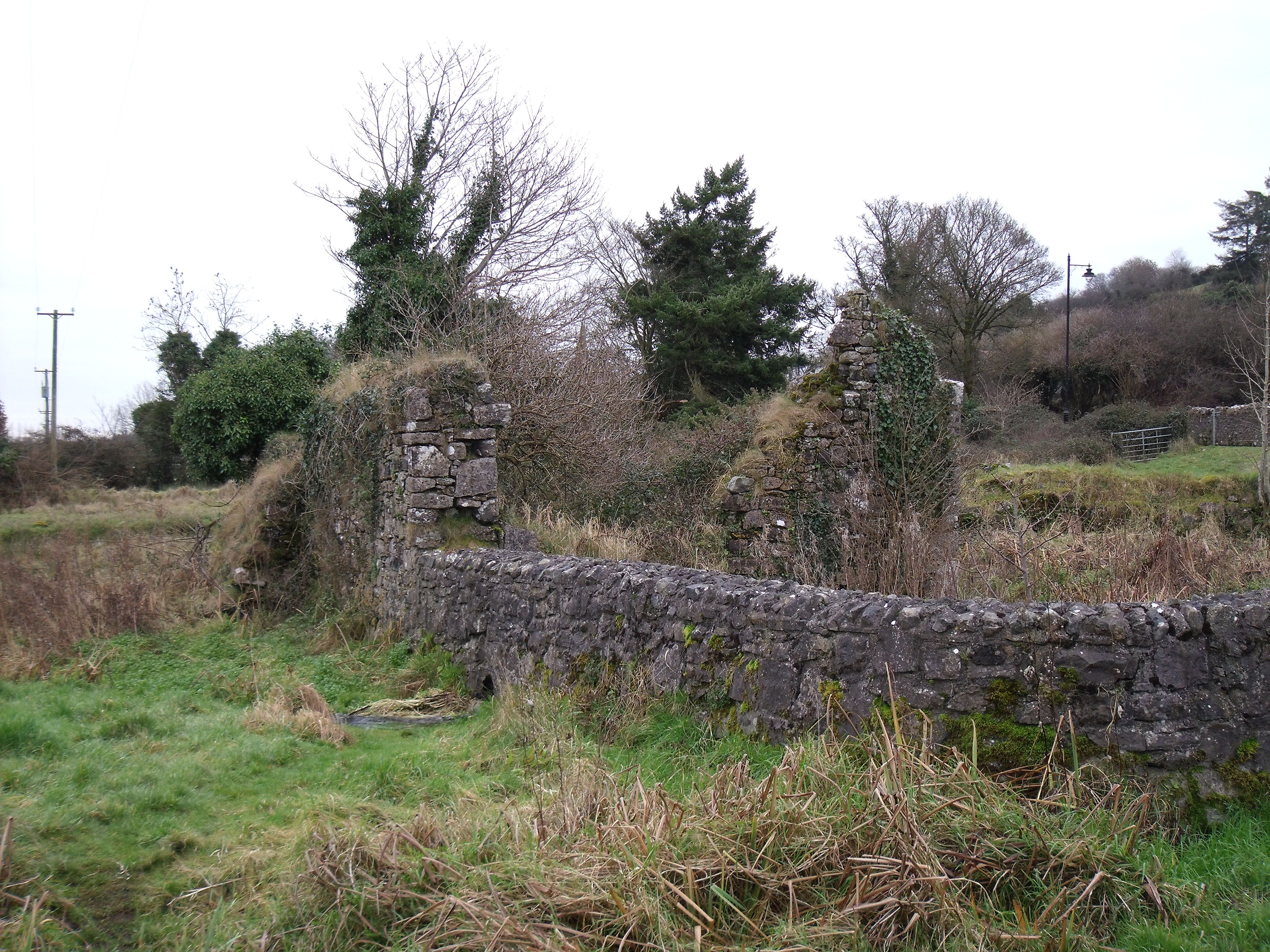
3. The water that flows uphill. (St. Fechin reportedly used his staff to make the water flow uphill)
4. The tree that has three branches/the tree that won't burn. Pilgrims place coins in it, giving it the name "the copper tree."
5. The water that doesn't boil in St Fechin's holy well.
6. The anchorite in a cell, which is a small tower house on the slope above the churches with a mausoleum to the Nugent family added in the 19th century, giving the whole structure the appearance of a church. Photo: The Anchorite Cell (below right)
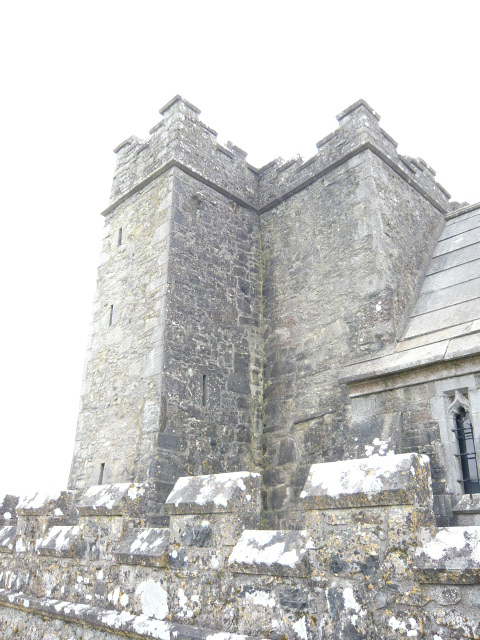
7. The lintel-stone raised by St. Fechin's prayers. Photo: Lintel stone of 7th-century Church
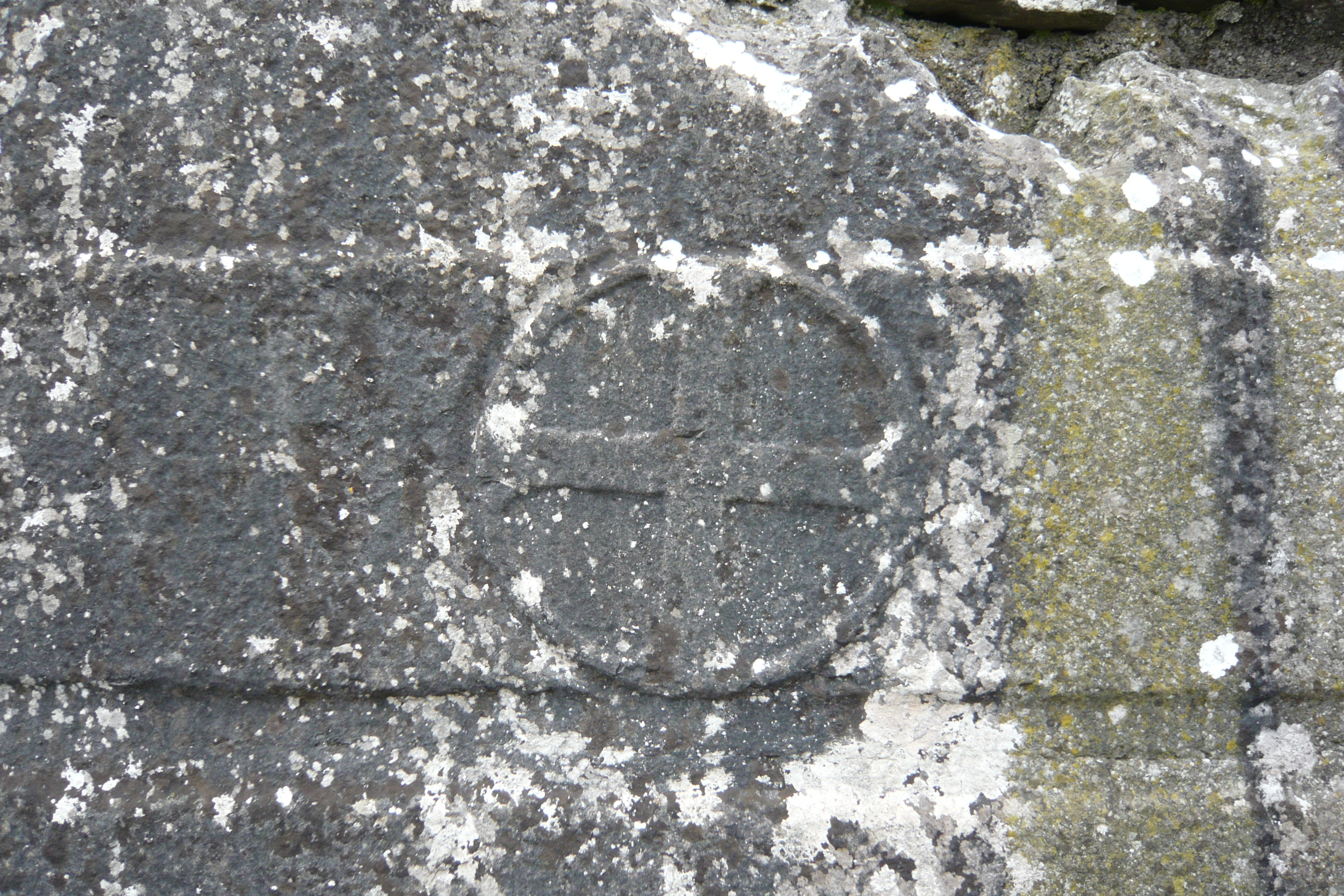

== Conclusion ==
Another important aspect of Fore is the Fore Crosses one of which is in the village of Fore. There are 18 crosses; some crosses are plain (most likely due to wind and rain erosion) whilst others still remain carved. These are spread out over 7 miles on roadways. The lands associated with the abbey in the middle ages were extensive taking in many of the townlands/parishes around Castlepollard.

== Gallery ==
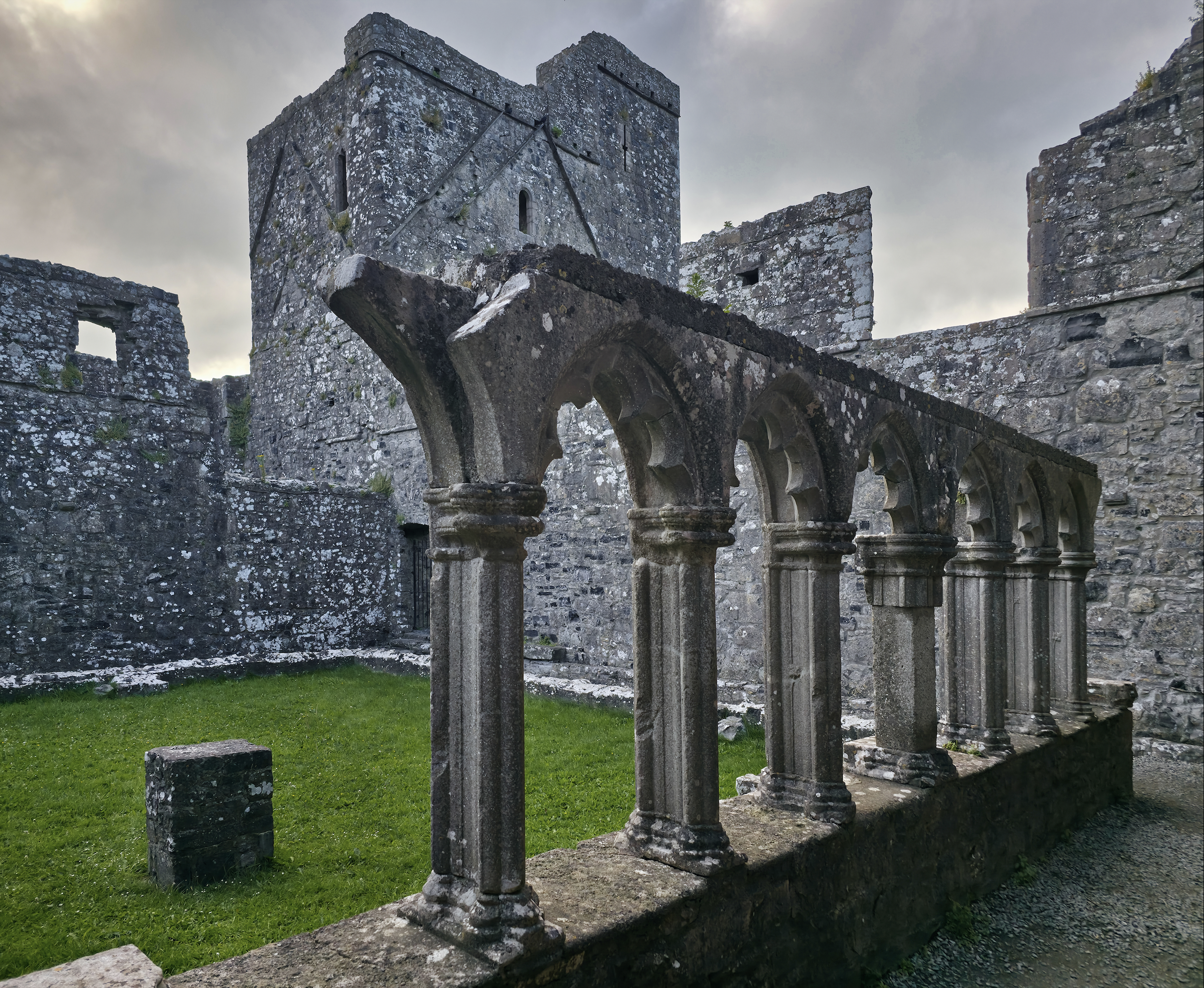
Fore Abbey Cloister

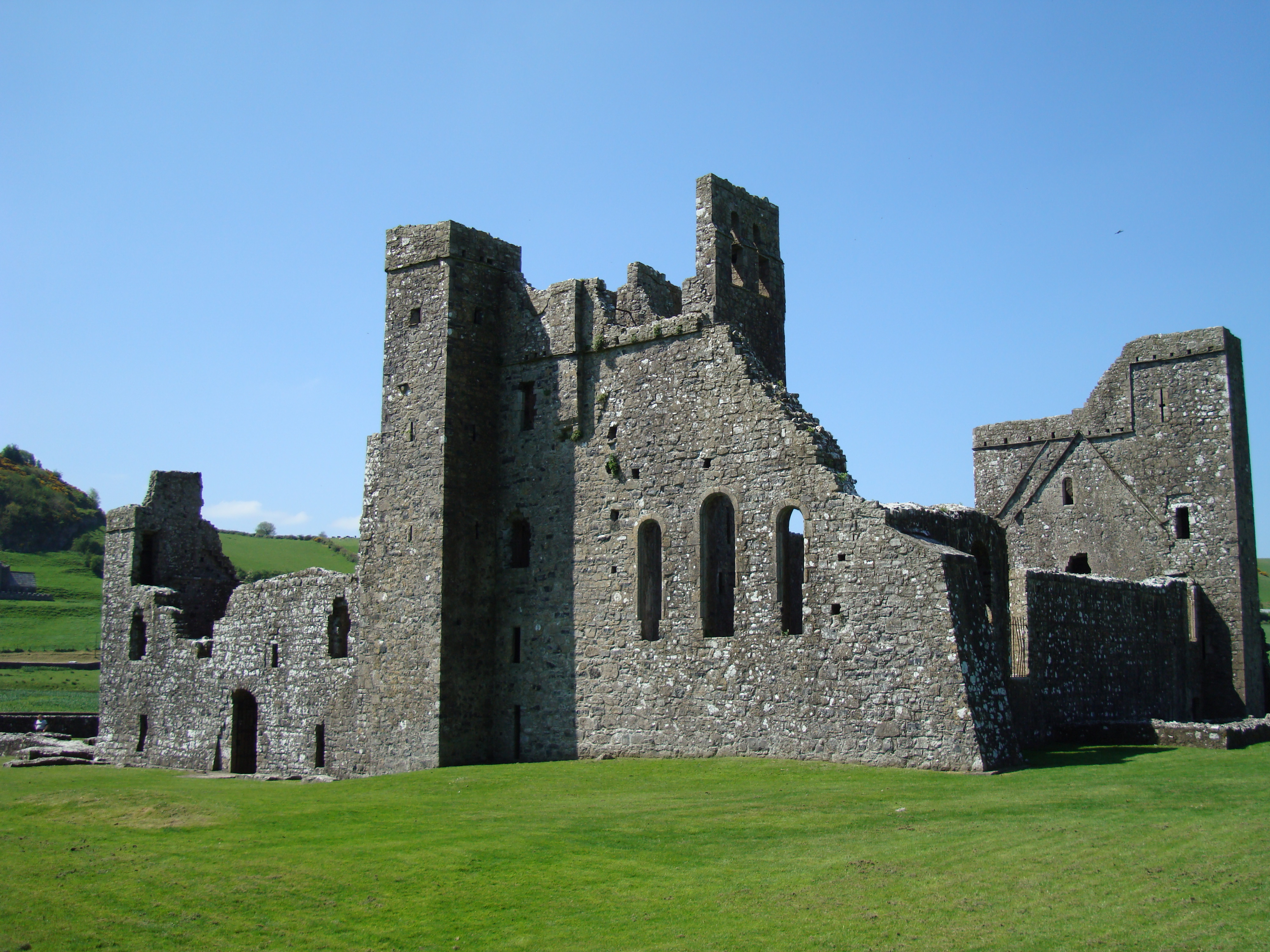
Fore Abbey

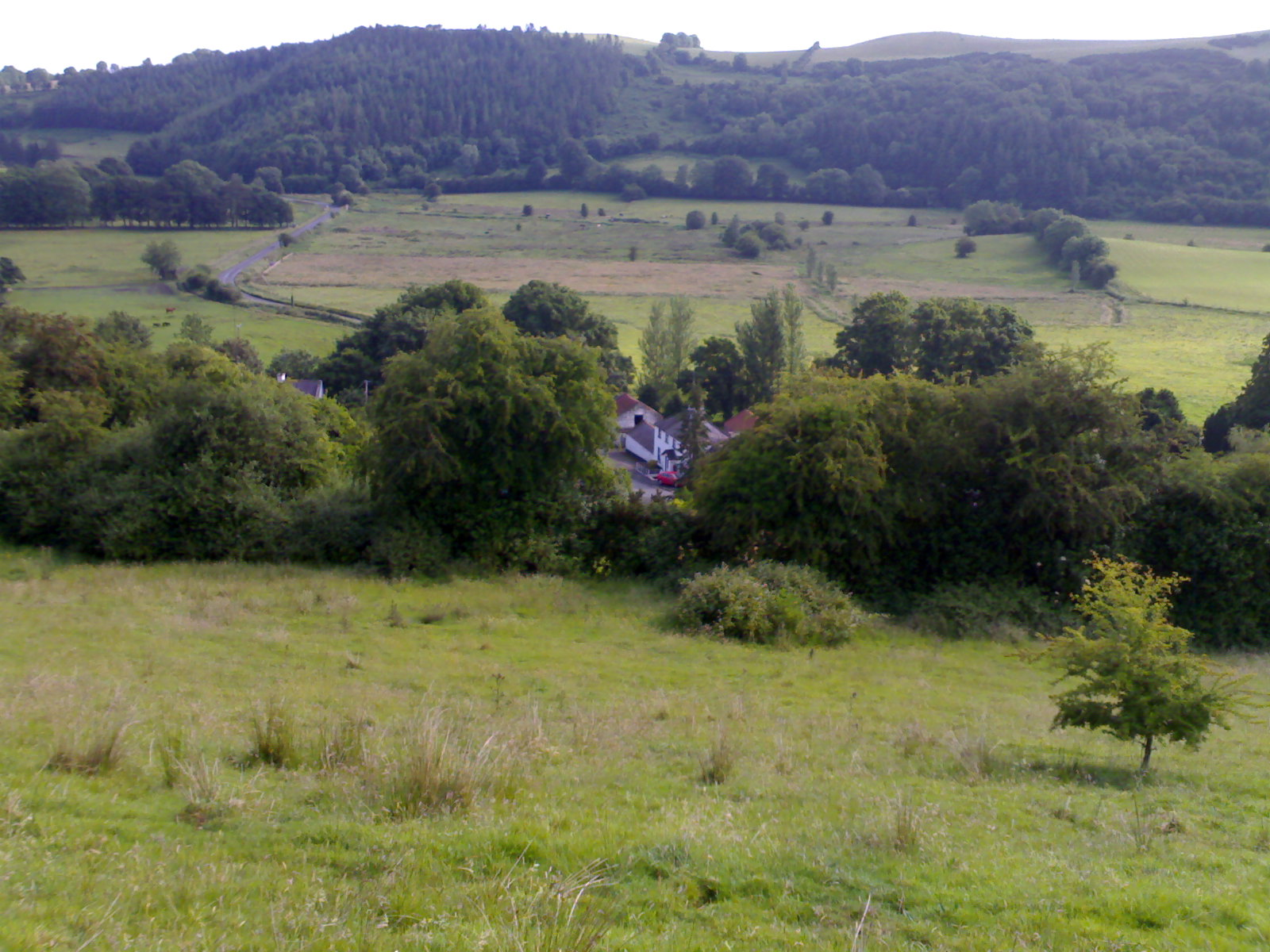
Fore Village

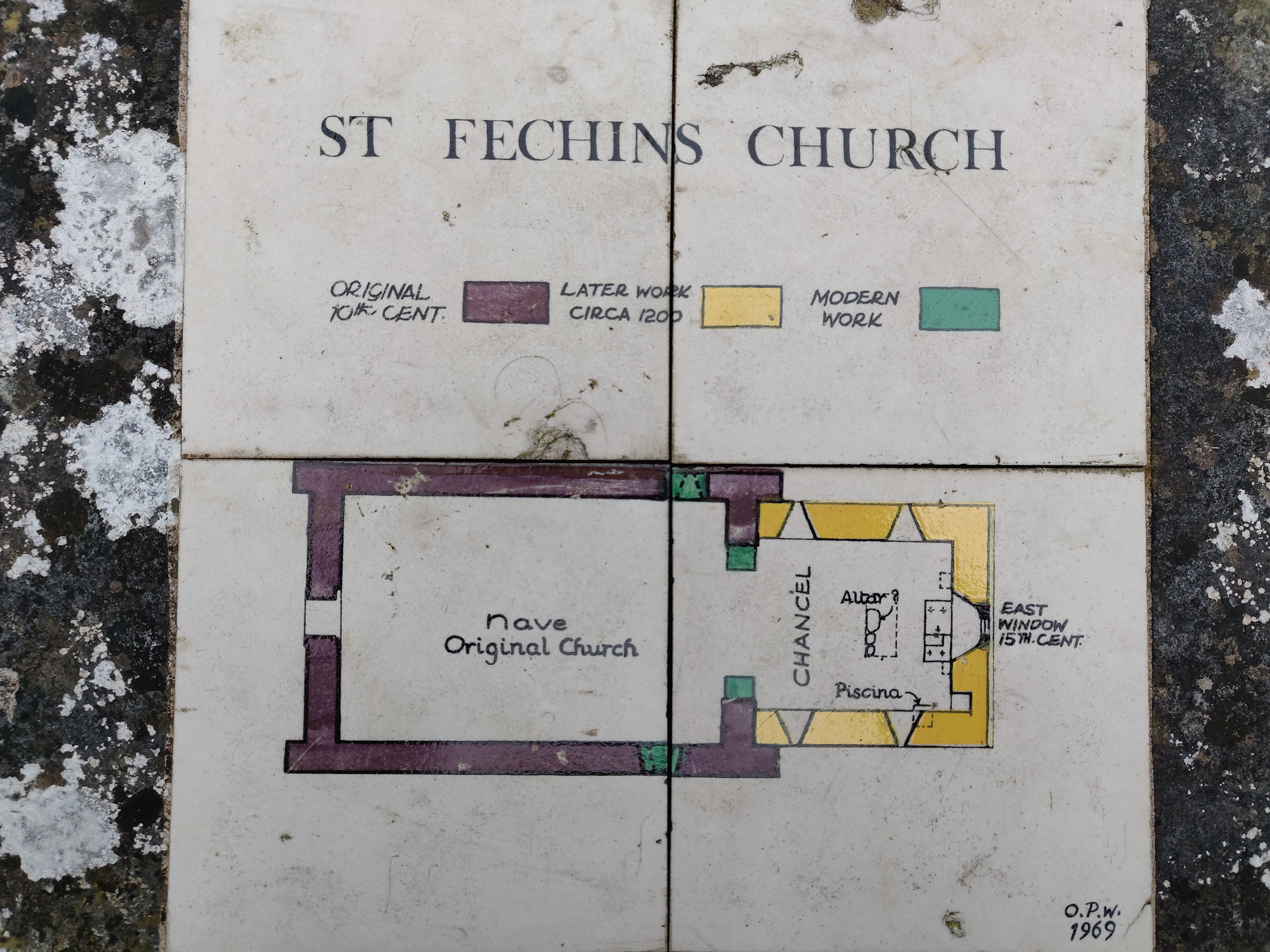

== See also ==
- Fore, County Westmeath
- List of abbeys and priories in Ireland (County Westmeath)
