= Turgesius Island =

Turgesius Island Inis Thuresius
- Town
- Location in Ireland
- Coordinates: 53°39′45″N 7°13′20″W
- Country: Ireland
- Province: Leinster
- County: County Westmeath
- Elevation: 125 m (410 ft)
- Time zone: UTC+0 (WET)
  - Summer (DST): UTC-1 (IST (WEST))

The principal island on Lough Lene is named after Turgesius who was a Viking leader who is said to have conquered Dublin.

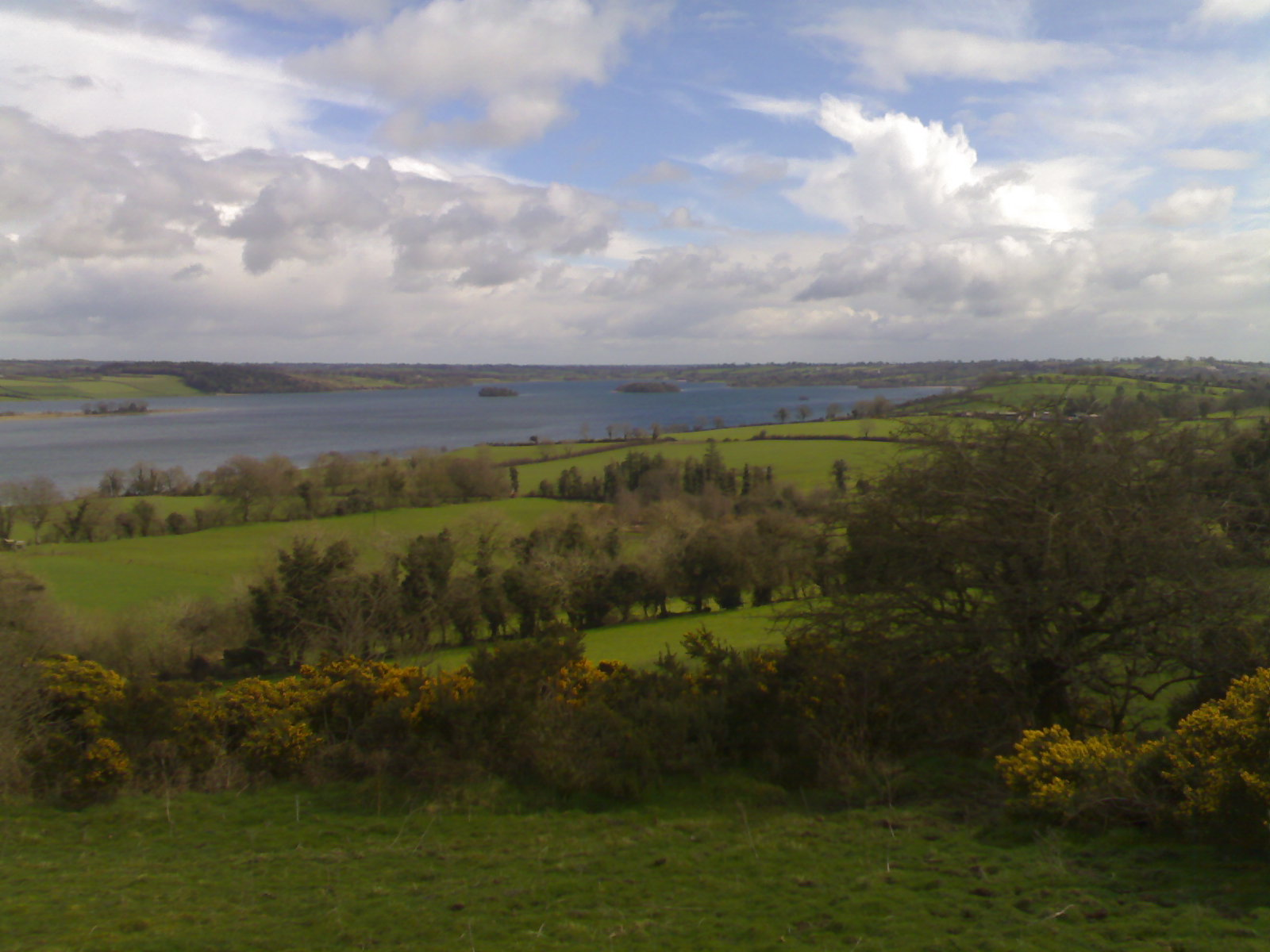
Turgesius Island middle Lough Lene
