= Turgesius =

Viking chief in Ireland

Turgesius (died 845) (also called Turgeis, Tuirgeis, Turges, and Thorgest) was a Viking chief active in Ireland during the 9th century. Turgesius Island, the principal island on Lough Lene, is named after him. It is not at all clear whether the names in the Irish annals represent the Old Norse Thurgestr or Thorgísl. John O'Donovan and Charles Haliday independently identified him with Ragnar Loðbrók, but the identification is not generally accepted.

== Life ==
The sole reliable record of Turgesius is a report of his death in the Annals of Ulster. In 845 he was captured by Máel Sechnaill mac Máele Ruanaid of Clann Cholmáin who was High King of Ireland. These reports state that Turgesius was drowned in Lough Owel. Less certainly, the Annals of the Four Masters associate Turgesius with attacks on Connacht, Mide and the church at Clonmacnoise in the year before his death. It has been speculated that Muslim poet and diplomat Yahya ibn al-Hakam al-Bakri al-Jayyani (d. 864) may have paid a visit to the court of this Norse ruler. After the attack of the Vikings on the coast of al-Andalus in the year 844, he was sent north on a diplomatic mission.

== Conquests ==
No history is recorded for Turgesius in his native Scandinavia, and knowledge of him is based on the history of his conquests as recorded in Ireland and Great Britain. Giraldus Cambrensis (also known as Gerald of Wales) described Turgesius as one of the early Viking conquerors of Ireland. It is believed that Turgesius first came to Ireland in the year 820, but his arrival as a leader of his own force was in around 837. He led a fleet of 120 ships, half of which entered the River Boyne, and the other half the River Liffey. He took the settlement of Dublin by force from the native rural and fishing community. He built a strong fort, according to Scandinavian methods, on the hill where now stands Dublin Castle. From there, he launched further conquests into Ireland (Leinster and Munster), and across the Irish Sea to Wales.

Among the sites he captured was the rich monastery of Clonmacnoise on the eastern bank of the River Shannon and south of Lough Ree. He established several inland centres of operation. One of his cardinal forts was on Lough Ree, north of Athlone. Another fort was at a point called Lyndwachill on Lough Neagh, while others were on the high ground southwest of Lough Lene and on the major island of this lake, which still bears his name and was where he dominated the Leinster midland from. In 843, King Niall Caille met Turgesius in battle when defending his ancestral province of Ulster. Niall fought against both the Vikings of Lough Neagh and a further party who sailed into Lough Swilly. On the plain of Moynith, the forces of King Niall and Turgesius met and, according to the annals, "a countless number fell". The result of the battle was that King Niall had vanquished Turgesius.

== Death ==
In the year 843 or 844 Turgesius was killed by Máel Sechnaill I (also called Malachy), King of Meath, and a subordinate of Turgesius. There are conflicting reports of how Turgesius met his death. He is reputed to have been put to death by drowning in Lough Owel near Mullingar. Local tradition says that Máel Sechnaill governed under Turgesius and is believed to have asked advice from Turgesius how best to rid the area of a recently invading flock of birds who were causing damage. Without a second thought, Turgesius recommended destroying their nests and this inspired Maél Sechnaill to do the same in order to rid his territory of the Vikings. Another story of his death states that he demanded Melaghlin's daughter's hand in marriage. While pretending to agree, Melaghlin sent Turgesius 12 beardless youths, disguised as his daughter and her attendants, who were in reality assassins.

The seventeenth-century historian Geoffrey Keating wrote in Foras Feasa ar Éirinn

"Now at this time Maoilseachlainn with a body of soldiers was with his daughter, and he directed a number of those youths who were with her disguised as women, the moment Turgesius should lay hands on his daughter for the purpose of detaining her with him, to seize him by force and take him captive, and another party to take possession of the arms that were in the house, and to spring upon the chiefs who were within; and he said that he himself with his body of soldiers would be near the house, and that he would rush into the house at the first cry to help them slay the Lochlannaigh. Thereupon the maiden with her ladies went in by a back door of the house and reached the room of Turgesius; and when they had come into his presence, he glanced at the maiden and her ladies and none of them pleased him but herself, and then he laid hands on her to detain her with him. When the youths who were with her saw this, a party of them seized Turgesius by force and made him captive; the remaining party seized the arms and held them in their possession, and then Maoilseachlainn with his party of soldiers came in, and they sprang on the party of Lochlonnaigh that were in the fortress, and slew them all, both chiefs and underlings except Turgesius alone; and when they had stripped the fortress bare they led Turgesius to the duinlios of Maoilseachlainn where they kept him for a time in captivity."

== Myth ==
By the twelfth century, when The War of the Irish with the Foreigners (Cogad Gaedel re Gaillaib) was composed to magnify the achievements of Brian Bóruma, Turgesius had become a major figure. Gerald of Wales, who may have had access to a version of this work, included similar accounts in his Topographia Hibernica although these accounts are now not always deemed trustworthy.

According to The War of the Irish with the Foreigners, Turgesius was married to Ottar or Ota (commonly thought to be Old Norse Auðr, Odda or another name beginning in Odd-), who took possession of the cathedral at Clonmacnoise and gave audiences seated on the great altar. This appears to be a reference to her being a völva or performing spæ. However, the Arabic account of the mission of al-Ghazal to the Vikings calls the king's wife Nūd.

== See also ==
- Early Scandinavian Dublin
- History of Ireland (800–1169)
- Norse activity in the British Isles

== Related reading ==
- Charles-Edwards, T. M. (2006) The Chronicle of Ireland, translated texts for historians (Liverpool: Liverpool University Press) ISBN 978-0853239598
