= Lough Lene =

Lake in north County Westmeath, Ireland

- Loch Léinn (Irish)
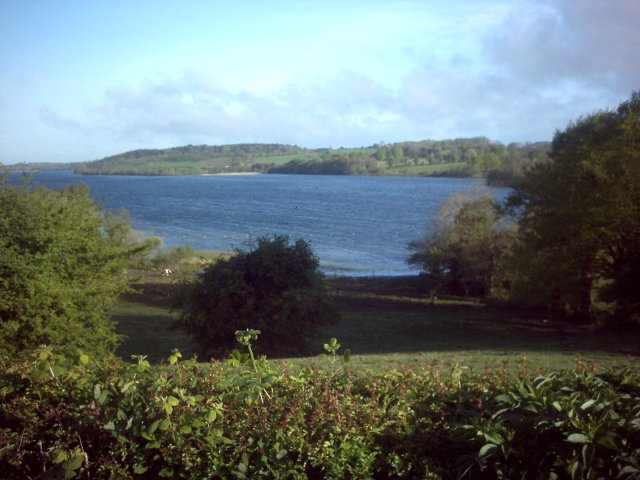

- Location in Ireland
- Location: County Westmeath
- Coordinates: 53°39′53″N 7°14′13″W
- Type: Glacial lake
- Basin countries: Ireland
- Surface area: 5 km^{2} (1,200 acres)
- Surface elevation: 97 m (318 ft)
- Frozen: Winters of 1951, 1982, Jan & Dec. 2010
- Islands: Nun's Island, Castle Island, Turgesius Island

Lough Lene (/lɒx ˈliːn/, lokh LEEN; Irish: Loch Léinn) is a lake situated in north County Westmeath, Ireland, between the villages of Castlepollard, Collinstown and Fore.

It has a rich and varied history, including several prehistoric burial sites, old ruins, a number of ancient village-type communal circular dwellings locally called ringforts, stiles, and mass paths. Lough Lene also has claims to being the home to kings and Vikings, such as Turgesius who had one of his forts upon the hill on the southwest overlooking the lake from the Ranaghan side, before being killed by Máel Sechnaill mac Maíl Ruanaid.

Lough Lene's water acts as a reservoir for several surrounding villages.

== Geography and Hydrology ==
Lough Lene has a water surface of 4.16 km^{2}. It is fed by two little streams on its western end and its southern bank. It discharges into River Deal which joins River Boyne from the left near Donore Castle. From the outlet of Lough Lene, there is about 1 km of course to the junction with River Deel, which is about 2 km upstream of Lough Adeel

== History and folklore ==
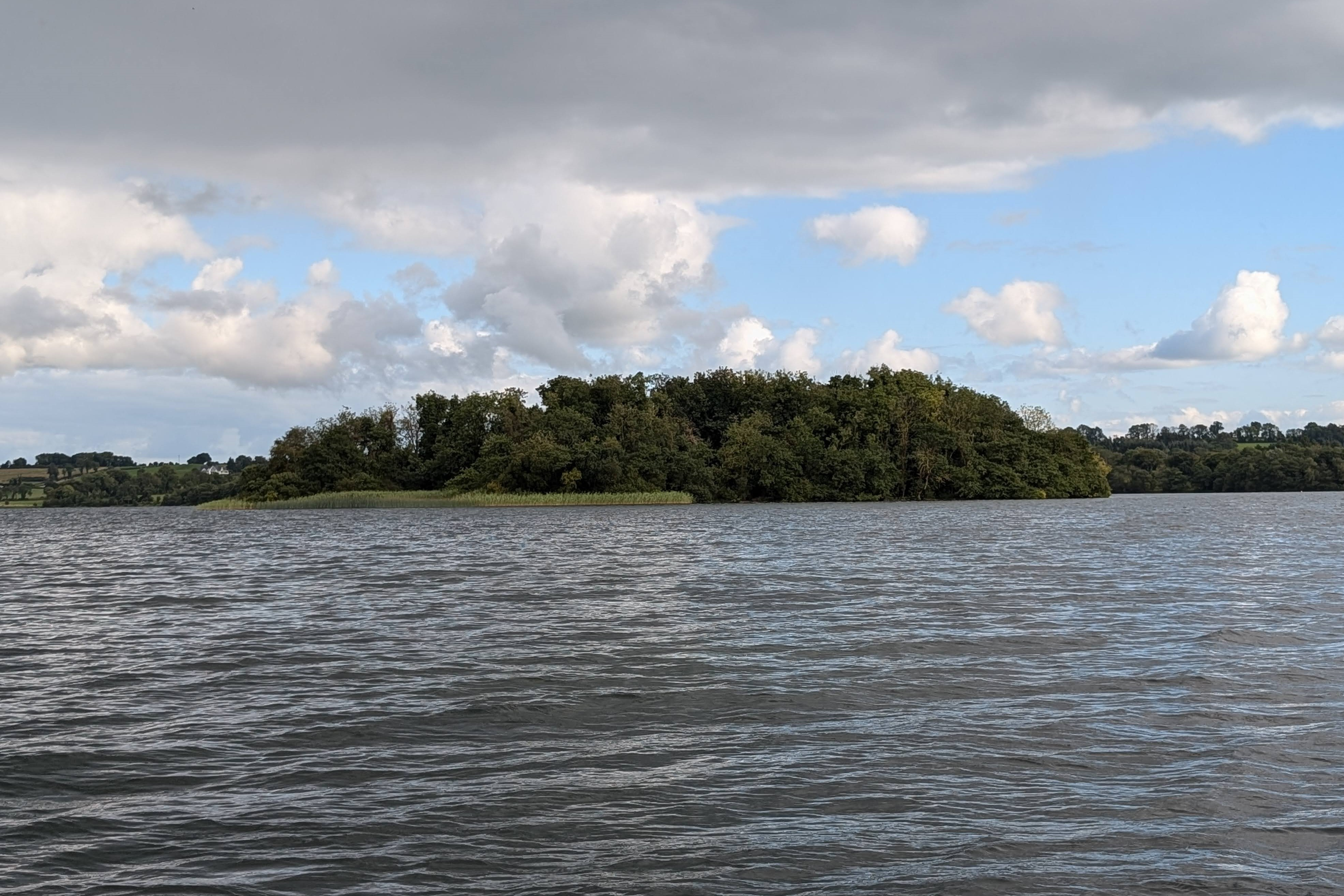
Turgesius Island viewed from Lough Lene

The name of the lake has appeared in a variety of ways including Lane, Léin and Leibhinn. Sir Henry Piers believed the lake's name translated as "Lake of Learning", tying in with his translation of Fore as the "Town of Books". However, other sources seem more inclined to the tradition that the lake was named after the daughter of the fabled Manannán mac Lir (see Children of Lir).

The lake is described in Samuel Lewis's Topographical Dictionary of Ireland (1837) as being an irregular oval shape, possibly 3.2 km (2.0 mi) long by 1.7 km (1.1 mi) broad. A fresh water lake, most sources focus on the clarity of the water, with the term "gin clear" being used to describe it. It sits approximately 97 metres (312 ft) above sea level and covers approximately 5 km^{2} (1,200 acres).

Nun's Island on Lough Lene was once the site of a convent. Baile na gCailleach, the old Irish language name for the town of Collinstown, when translated means "the town of the veiled women" or "the town of the old hags". This was an irreverent name which referred to the nuns of the convent on the island.

The two other islands are Castle Island, and Turgesius Island. An ancient bell was found on Castle Island in 1881 and is now in the National Museum of Ireland. A half size reproduction of the ancient bell was presented to Dáil Éireann in 1931 by the widow of a former member of the House, Bryan Cooper, and it has since been the bell of the Ceann Comhairle (chairperson) of Dáil Éireann.

A survey revealed that Nun's Island was a complex stone structure with causeway-like features, while Castle Island showed the best potential, with a large assemblage of worked timbers. Two logboats were also recovered in 1968, one with dovetail joints. This work continues today. These Roman-period log-boats were constructed for lake fishing, and were about 8 m long, 1.5 m wide, and 80 centimetres deep, were made of oak, yew, and possibly willow. The boats were paddle propelled. Other notable constructional features are that they were complex boats: carved; dugout (extended); mortice-and-tenon; and sewn.

In 1969, Collinstown, Rickardstown and Glenidan formed a Gaelic Athletic Association (GAA) club called the Lough Lene Gaels.

== Water sports ==
Windsurfing on the lough

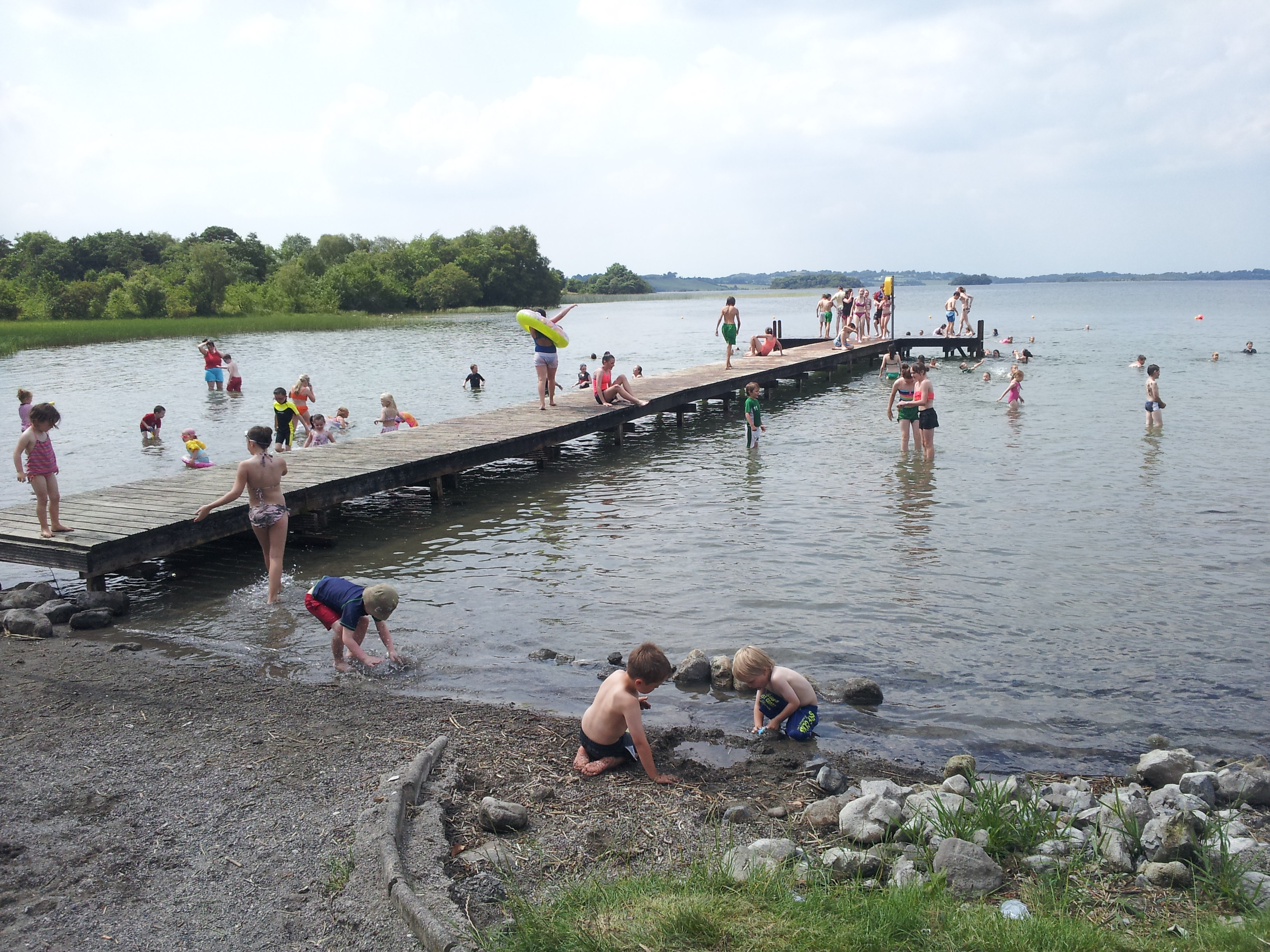
Lough Lene bathing pier

Lough Lene was one of the first freshwater lakes in Ireland to obtain a Blue Flag for its pollution-free water.

Swimming, sailing and windsurfing are popular in the lake, and dressing-rooms and picnic areas are available at the point locally referred to as "the Cut". "The Cut" is situated approximately 2 km north of the Collinstown cross-roads on the east end of the lake.

Due to the quality and clarity of the water, together with the safe access at "the Cut", the lough is a popular bathing and swimming location. Local Triathlon clubs and Meath Masters Swimming Club train and hold events here regularly. In Summertime, average water temperatures are around 17c. One of the more popular training swims is out to Turgesius Island – a distance of one mile from the slipway at the cut. In 2022, a permanent "swim trail" of 5 large swimmers buoys was laid out along the North Shore in a 750m course (1500m return). More buoys were also installed in the separate designated bathing area.

== Ecology ==
=== Conservation ===
Parts of the lake are protected, under the European Union's Habitats Directive (92/43EEC), as a Special Area of Conservation.

Lough Lene is a deep lake, which is 20 metres (66 ft) deep in some parts. It is a clear hard water lake with marl deposition particularly noticeable along long stretches of its shores.

The lake supports a range of pondweeds that include Potamogeton perfoliatus and P. lucens, Canadian pondweed (Elodea canadensis), and a variety of stoneworts (Chara spp., such as C. pedunculata and C. curta) which are marl or hard-water lake indicators.

A stony shore line fringes much of the lake, where there are species such as spike-rush (Eleocharis sp.) jointed rush (Polygonum persicaria), marsh pennywort (Hydrocotyle vulgaris), and sedges (Carex spp.). A narrow fringe of emigerent plant species dominated by common reed (Phragmites australis) and common club-rush (Schoenoplectus lacustris) occurs along some stretches of the lakeshore.

Patches of wet woodland colonise former areas of cut-away and other low-lying areas close to the lake and are dominated by willows (Salix spp.), birch (Betula sp.) and alder (Alnus glutinosa) with patches of common reed also occurring. These areas support a rich flora. The ground flora of the wood at the northwestern end of the lake includes a range of peat mosses (Sphagnum spp.), bilberry (Vaccinium myrtillus) and heather (Calluna vulgaris). Alder carr occurs on the juttland into the lake at its northwestern side.

Freshwater marsh/fen vegetation, with such species as purple moor-grass (Molinia caerulea), bottle sedge (Carex rostrata), black bog-rush (Schoenus nigricans), and marsh cinquefoil (Potentilla palustris), occurs in certain areas near the lake; one such area supports a population of rare round-leaved wintergreen (Pyrola rotundifolia subsp. rotundifolia).

=== Bird life ===
Bird species recorded at Lough Lene include mute swan, teal, pochard, great crested grebe, little grebe, tufted duck, grey heron, water rail, mallard, goldeneye, cormorant and wigeon. The surrounding lands are inhabited by snipe, lapwing and curlew. Of particular significance is the pochard population which, in the winters of 1995/1996 and 1996/1997, there were numbers of national importance averaging 515 individual birds of this population.

Much of the lake shore is accessible to grazing cattle, goats, sheep and horses. Unpolluted hard-water lakes such as Lough Lene are becoming increasingly rare in Ireland and in Europe and are of a type that is listed upon the Annex of the E.U. Habitat Directive.

=== Crayfish ===
Lough Lene previously had a population of fresh water crayfish, a species that is listed on Annex II of the E.U. Habitats Directive. This species disappeared from Lough Lene in 1987 following an outbreak of crayfish fungus plague. The species was re-introduced and breeding was recorded in 1995. Since then, a further outbreak of the crayfish fungus plague has once again led to the disappearance of the species from Lough Lene.

== See also ==
- List of loughs in Ireland
