= County Westmeath =

County in Ireland

Coordinates: 53°30′N 7°30′W

County Westmeath Contae na hIarmhí
- County
- Coat of arms
- Nickname: The Lake County
- Motto: Irish: Triath ós Triathaibh "Noble above nobility"
- Interactive map of County Westmeath
- Country: Ireland
- Province: Leinster
- Region: Eastern and Midland
- Established: 1542
- County town: Mullingar
- Largest settlement: Athlone

Government
  - Local authority: Westmeath County Council
  - Dáil constituencies: Longford–Westmeath
  - EP constituency: Midlands–North-West

Area
  - Total: 1,840 km^{2} (710 sq mi)
  - Rank: 21st
- Highest elevation (Mullaghmeen): 258 m (846 ft)

Population (2022)
  - Total: 95,840
  - Rank: 22nd
  - Density: 52.1/km^{2} (135/sq mi)
- Time zone: UTC±0 (WET)
  - Summer (DST): UTC+1 (IST)
- Eircode routing keys: N37, N91 (primarily)
- Telephone area codes: 044, 090 (primarily)
- ISO 3166 code: IE-WH
- Vehicle index mark code: WH

County Westmeath (/wɛstˈmiːð/; Irish: Contae na hIarmhí or simply An Iarmhí) is a county in Ireland. It is in the province of Leinster and is part of the Eastern and Midland Region. It formed part of the historic Kingdom of Meath, which was named Mide because the kingdom was located in the geographical centre of Ireland (the word Mide meaning 'middle'). Westmeath County Council is the administrative body for the county, and the county town is Mullingar. At the 2022 census, the population of the county was 95,840.

== History ==
Following the Norman invasion of Ireland, the territory of the Gaelic Kingdom of Meath formed the basis for the Anglo-Norman Lordship of Meath granted by King Henry II of England to Hugh de Lacy in 1172. Following the failure of de Lacy's male heirs in 1241, the Lordship was split between two great-granddaughters. One moiety, a central eastern portion, was awarded to Maud (de Geneville) as the liberty of Trim; the other moiety, comprising north-eastern and western portions, went to Maud's sister Margery (de Verdun) and in 1297 became the royal county of Meath. The liberty and royal county were merged in 1461. While the east of the county was in the English Pale, the west was Gaelicised in the fourteenth century and outside the control of the sheriff of Meath.

As a part of the better administration of the newly established Kingdom of Ireland, the Parliament of Ireland passed the Counties of Meath and Westmeath Act 1543, the eastern portion retaining the name Meath and the western portion called Westmeath.

== Geography and subdivisions ==
Westmeath is the 20th largest of Ireland's 32 counties by area and the 22nd largest in terms of population. It is the sixth largest of Leinster's 12 counties in size and eighth largest in terms of population. The Hill of Uisneach in the barony of Moycashel is sometimes regarded as the notional geographical centre of Ireland although the actual geographic centre of Ireland lies in neighbouring County Roscommon. The summit of Mullaghmeen is the highest point in County Westmeath. At just 258 metres this makes it the lowest county top in Ireland.

== Local government and politics ==
The island of Ireland, showing location of County Westmeath.

The head office of Westmeath County Council is located in Mullingar. There are currently 20 councillors. The three local electoral areas of Westmeath are Athlone (7 seats), Mullingar–Coole (7 seats) and Mullingar–Kilbeggan (6 seats). The Local Government (Ireland) Act 1898 provided the framework for the establishment of County Councils throughout Ireland. The first meeting of Westmeath County Council was held on 22 April 1899.

Westmeath's population growth has been stronger than the national average. After the Great Famine, the population of Westmeath declined dramatically. It stabilised in the middle of the 20th century, and has continued to grow. Westmeath's proximity to Dublin, with good motorway facilities and frequent rail service, has made commuting popular.

County Westmeath's population fell in the century following the Great Famine, with many leaving for better opportunities in America. The largest town in the county is Athlone, followed by Mullingar. Westmeath is the largest county by population in the Irish Midlands. Important commercial and marketing centres include Moate, Kilbeggan, Kinnegad, Ballinahown, Delvin, Rochfortbridge, Killucan and Castlepollard. According to the 2011 census, 51.9% of Westmeath households have at least one member reporting an ability in Irish.

Westmeath is one of the few counties in Ireland where some census records from 1841 are still available. Some of the records of that census have been digitised and maintained by the National Archives of Ireland.

As of the 2022 census, Westmeath had a population of 95,840, consisting of 47,522 males and 48,318 females. The Central Statistics Office also said that despite the overall increase in population, the rural population had still fallen (2016 census).

Historical population
Year	Pop.	±%
1500	6,990	—
1510	5,290	−24.3%
1550	5,002	−5.4%
1580	14,999	+199.9%
1585	14,054	−6.3%
1600	4,335	−69.2%
1610	8,790	+102.8%
1653	12,090	+37.5%
1659	12,672	+4.8%
1672	13,550	+6.9%
1680	15,998	+18.1%
1690	21,666	+35.4%
1700	25,771	+18.9%
1710	31,677	+22.9%
1725	39,611	+25.0%
1735	42,889	+8.3%
1745	42,520	−0.9%
1755	40,345	−5.1%
1765	39,881	−1.2%
1771	50,167	+25.8%
1775	53,444	+6.5%
1781	68,771	+28.7%
1788	81,798	+18.9%
1790	97,319	+19.0%
1801	103,740	+6.6%
1811	107,566	+3.7%
1813	104,671	−2.7%
1816	121,451	+16.0%
1821	128,819	+6.1%
1831	136,872	+6.3%
1841	141,300	+3.2%
1851	111,407	−21.2%
1861	90,879	−18.4%
1871	78,432	−13.7%
1881	71,798	−8.5%
1891	65,109	−9.3%
1901	61,629	−5.3%
1911	59,986	−2.7%
1926	56,818	−5.3%
1936	54,706	−3.7%
1946	54,949	+0.4%
1951	54,463	−0.9%
1956	54,122	−0.6%
1961	52,861	−2.3%
1966	52,900	+0.1%
1971	53,570	+1.3%
1979	59,885	+11.8%
1981	61,523	+2.7%
1986	63,379	+3.0%
1991	61,880	−2.4%
1996	63,314	+2.3%
2002	71,858	+13.5%
2006	79,346	+10.4%
2011	86,164	+8.6%
2016	88,770	+3.0%
2022	95,840	+8.0%

== Economy ==
Canal at Mullingar

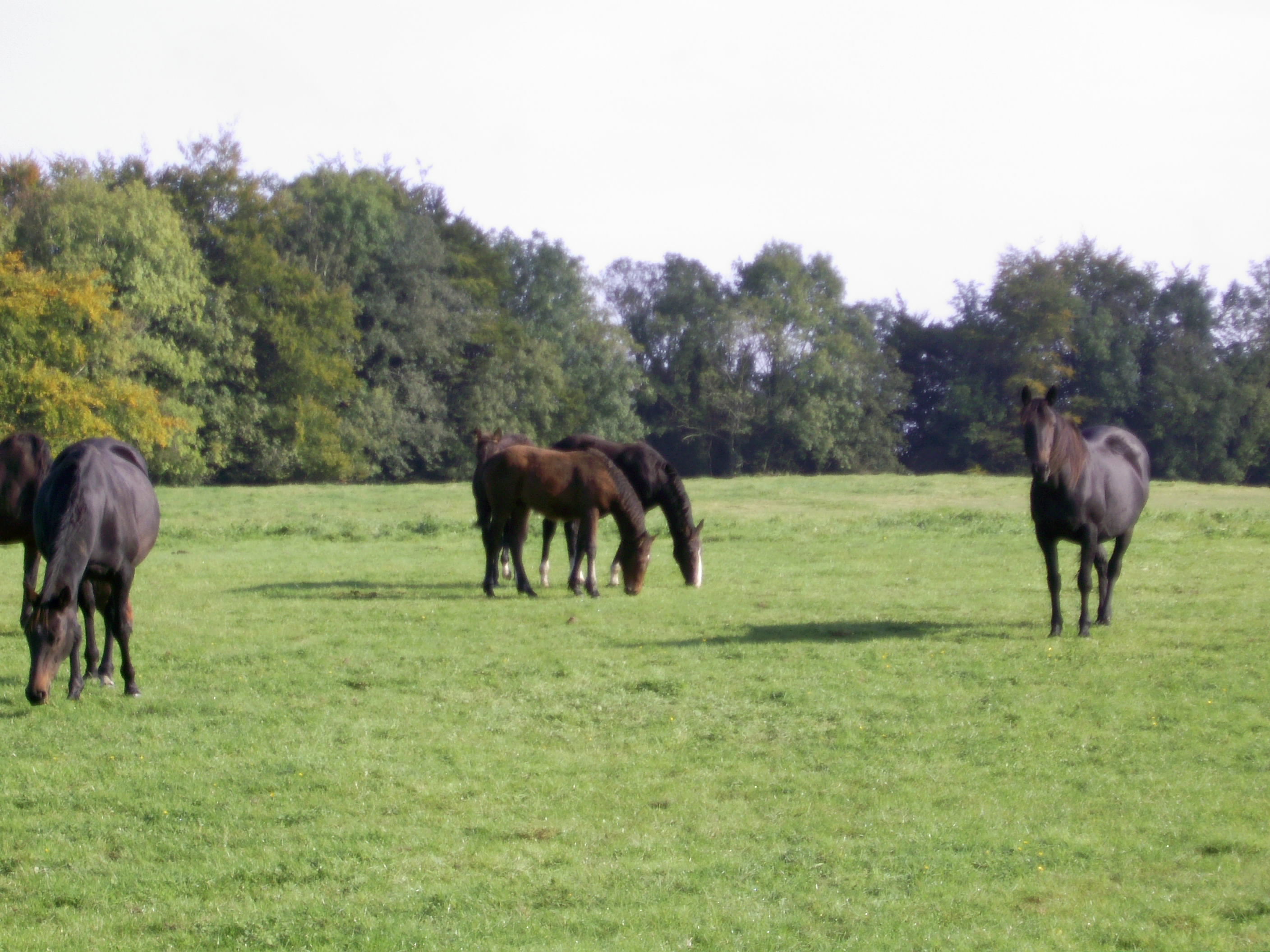
Barbavilla Stud Horses

Initially, development occurred around the major market centres of Mullingar, Moate, and Kinnegad. Athlone developed due to its military significance, and its strategic location on the main Dublin–Galway route across the River Shannon. Mullingar gained considerable advantage from the development of the Royal Canal. The canal facilitated cheap transport of produce to Dublin, Britain and Europe. Athlone and Mullingar expanded further with the coming of the Midland Great Western Railway network in the nineteenth century.

Tourism in Westmeath is generally based on its many water amenities. The county lakes include Lough Derravaragh, Lough Ennell, Lough Owel, Lough Lene, Lough Sheelin and Lough Ree. The River Shannon (Ireland's key tourism waterway) has a modern inland harbour in Athlone.

In 2017 the largest employment sectors within Westmeath were:

Sector	Percentage of total employment
Wholesale & retail trade	15%
Health & social work	13%
Education	11%
Manufacturing industries	9%
Agriculture	8%
Real estate, renting & business activities	7%
Hotels & restaurants	7%

Two major "Greenway" projects are intended to improve cycling facilities. The Athone—Mullingar section of the Dublin—Galway Greenway, along the old railway corridor between Athlone and Mullingar, was constructed in 2015. The Royal Canal Greenway takes tourists from the county boundary to Mullingar, and then on towards Longford. Those wishing to use the Dublin-Galway Greenway can transfer from the Royal Canal route to the old rail corridor onwards towards Athlone.

The development of industry in Westmeath has been mainly based on food processing and consumer products. Whiskey is distilled in Kilbeggan and tobacco is processed in Mullingar. The county has an extensive beef and dairy trade. In recent times, the manufacturer Alkermes has located in Athlone. The eastern part of the county is home to commuters, many of whom work at the technology parks on the western side of Dublin.

Mullingar is renowned for the high quality of its beef and veal. Weaned cattle from the west of the Shannon are fattened for market on the lush grasslands of Meath and Westmeath. The cattle are also used to maintain grassland to help sustain wildlife in the areas fringing the Bog of Allen.

Westmeath is home to many stud farms. The plains of Westmeath, covered in calcium-rich marl, contribute significantly to calcification of foal bones during their formative years. Westmeath mares are usually put into foal in spring to facilitate summer growth. Pregnancy lasts for approximately 335–340 days and usually results in one foal. Horses mature when they are around four years old.

== Railways ==
Westmeath also has railway infrastructure with a number of trains passing through towns in the county. The Dublin–Westport/Galway railway line runs through the county, with services from Dublin Heuston to Galway/Westport/Ballina inter-city train service stops at Athlone, while the Dublin-Sligo railway line service stops at Mullingar. The line from Athlone via Moate railway station to Mullingar is disused and converted into the Dublin-Galway Greenway. Other major infrastructural projects and plans for the county include Transport 21.

== Road transport ==
Roads are of good quality in the county. As part of the Transport 21 infrastructure programme undertaken by the government, both the N4 and N6 roads have been upgraded to motorway or dual carriageway standard. All towns that these roads passed through are now bypassed, such as Mullingar, Athlone, Moate and Kinnegad. Both Dublin and Galway are within commuting distance from Westmeath following the completion of the M6 motorway in December 2009.

- Midlands (ATM) Gateway
- National Development Plan
- Transport 21

== Sport ==
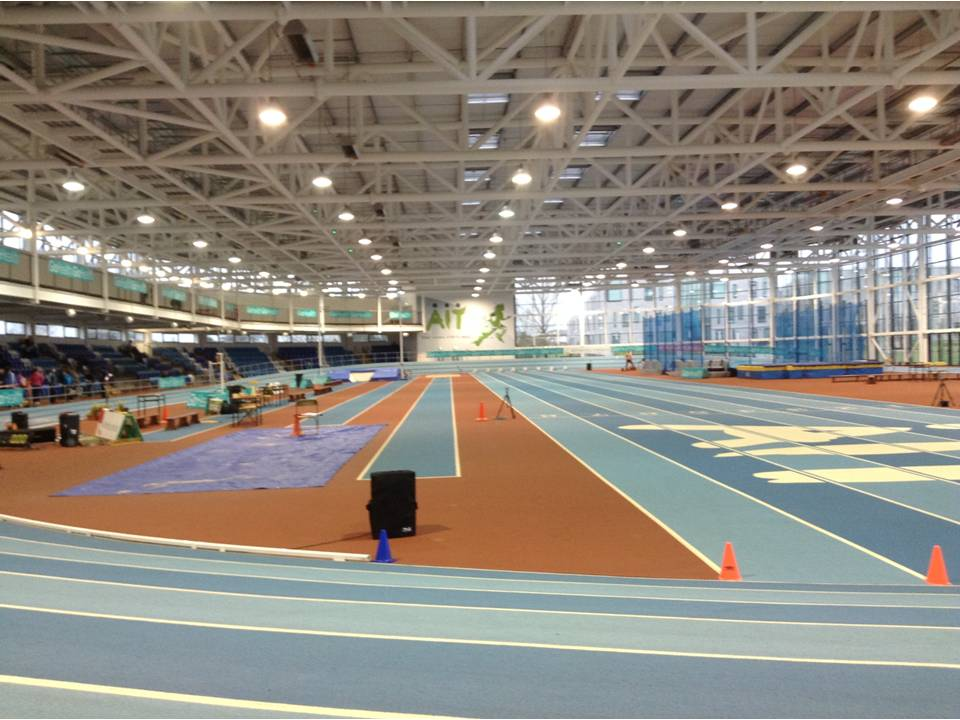
The Athlone International Arena in Athlone

Westmeath is an active sporting county. The Westmeath GAA senior football team won the Leinster Senior Football Championship, the Delaney Cup, in 2004, and again in 2026. They also won the National Football League Division 2 in 2001, 2003 and 2008. The Westmeath senior hurling team has enjoyed much recent success winning the Christy Ring Cup in 2005, 2007 and 2010.

Athlone Town F.C. have won the League of Ireland Championship on two occasions, in 1980 and 1982, and the FAI Cup in 1924.

Westmeath Ladies won the 2011 All-Ireland Intermediate Football Championship.

Athlone Institute of Technology boasts a €10 million international athletics arena, which opened in early 2013. The International Arena has a footprint of 6,818 m^{2} and an overall building floor area of 9,715 m^{2}. Some 850 tonnes of structural steel and fifty thousand concrete blocks went into the construction of the facility, which can house two thousand spectators.

Westmeath Snooker Ranking Tournaments officially recognised by The Republic of Ireland Billiards & Snooker Association are organised and run by St Mary's Snooker Club Bishopgate Street Mullingar. The Ranking events in Junior, Intermediate and Senior events are:

1. Mullingar Open Snooker Championship
2. Westmeath Open Snooker Championship
3. St.Mary's Open Classic Snooker Championship
4. The Midland Open Snooker Championship

== Notable people ==
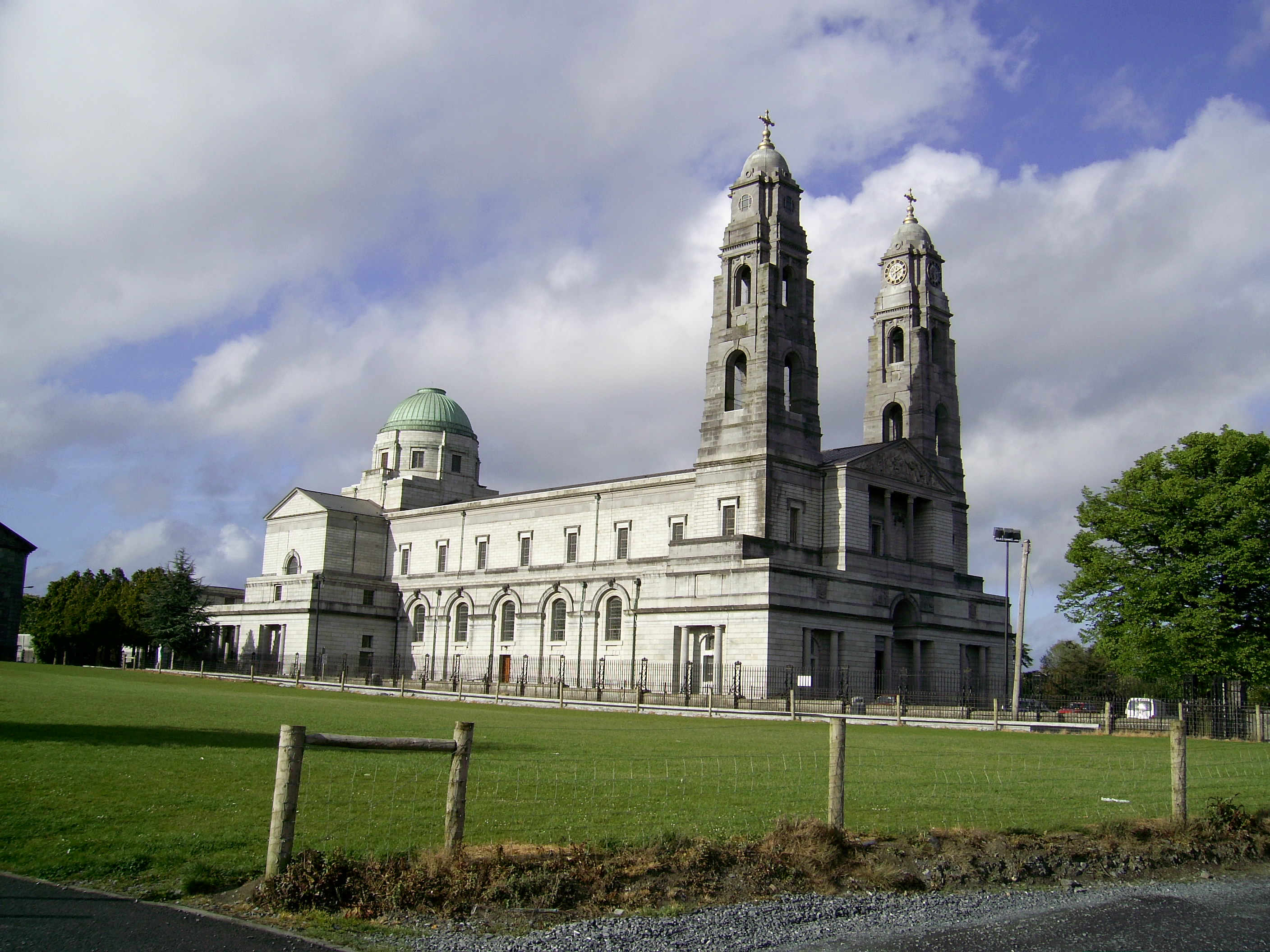
Christ the King Cathedral, Mullingar

Notable Westmeath natives include:

- The Academic, music group
- Tony Allen, of music duo Foster & Allen
- The Blizzards, music group
- Arthur Booth-Clibborn, pioneering Salvation Army officer in France and Switzerland
- Cecil Boyd-Rochfort, British thoroughbred racehorse trainer
- George Boyd-Rochfort, awarded Victoria Cross
- Emmet Cahill, singer from Irish group Celtic Thunder
- Joseph Charless (1772–1834), publisher in Kentucky and Missouri, born County Westmeath
- Michael Joseph Curley, Archbishop of Washington
- Joe Dolan, singer
- Domnall Midi, King of Mide
- Thomas Duffy, awarded Victoria Cross
- Gormflaith ingen Flann Sinna, Queen of Tara
- Laurence Ginnell, Irish nationalist political figure, Irish Parliamentary Party MP and later a Sinn Féin TD in the First Dáil
- Robbie Henshaw, Irish Rugby international
- Nuala Holloway, artist and former Miss Ireland
- Niall Horan, singer-songwriter and former member of band One Direction
- James Lennon, member of the Wisconsin State Assembly
- Ray Lynam, singer
- Máel Sechnaill II, King of Mide and King of Ireland
- John Count McCormack, tenor
- John Joe Nevin, boxer
- T. P. O'Connor, journalist, Irish nationalist political figure, British MP
- Niall mac Aed Ó hUiginn, poet
- Michael O'Leary, CEO of Ryanair
- Edward Pakenham, politician and Irish officer in the British army
- Thomas Pakenham, historian and arborist
- Peg Plunkett, Dublin brothel keeper
- Walter Raleigh, spent time at Killua Castle
- Nessa Robins, food writer, blogger and photographer
- Brendan Shine, singer
- Túathal Techtmar, High King of Ireland
- George Wade, British Army Field Marshal

== Gallery ==
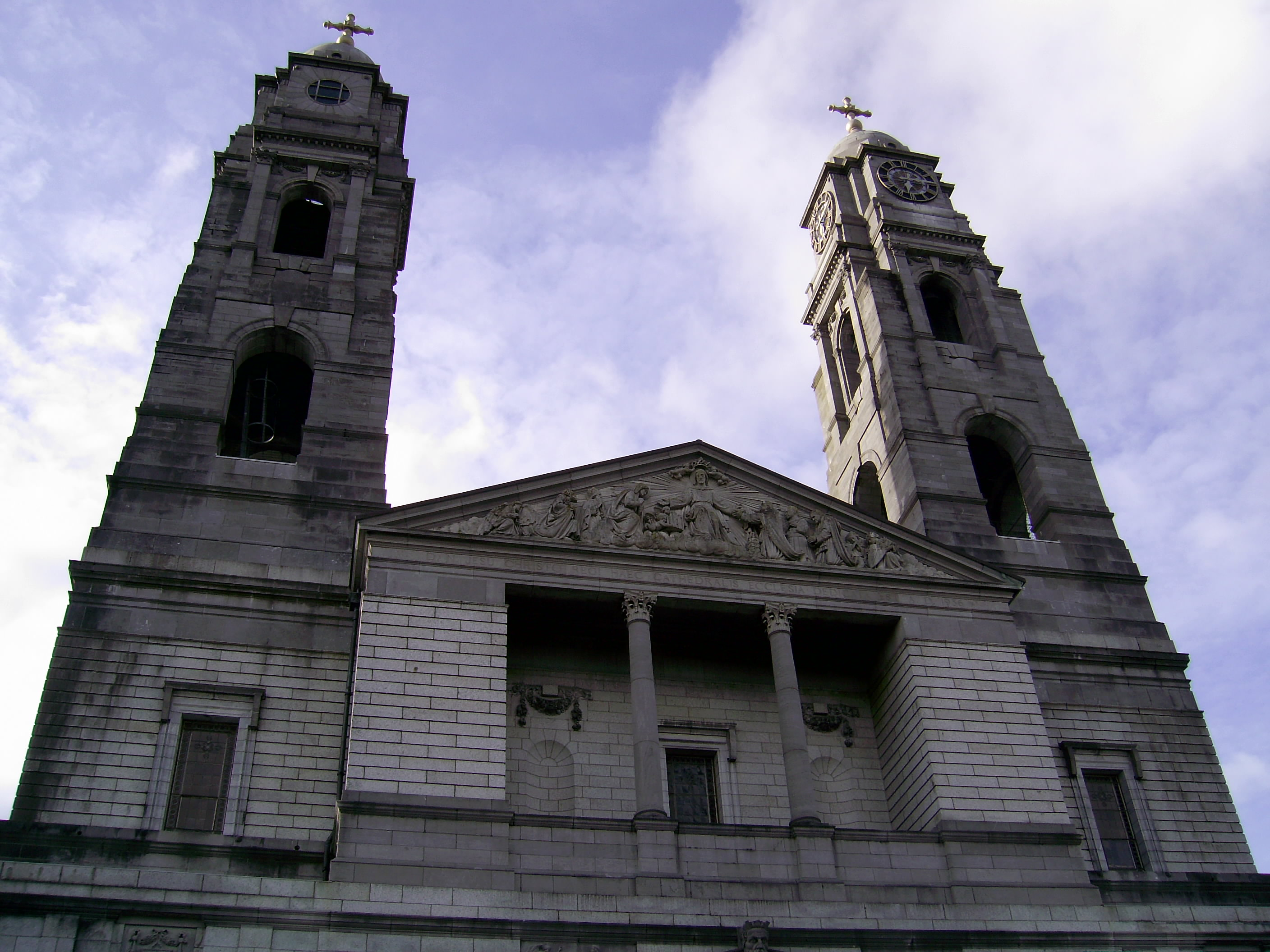
Christ the King Cathedral, Mullingar

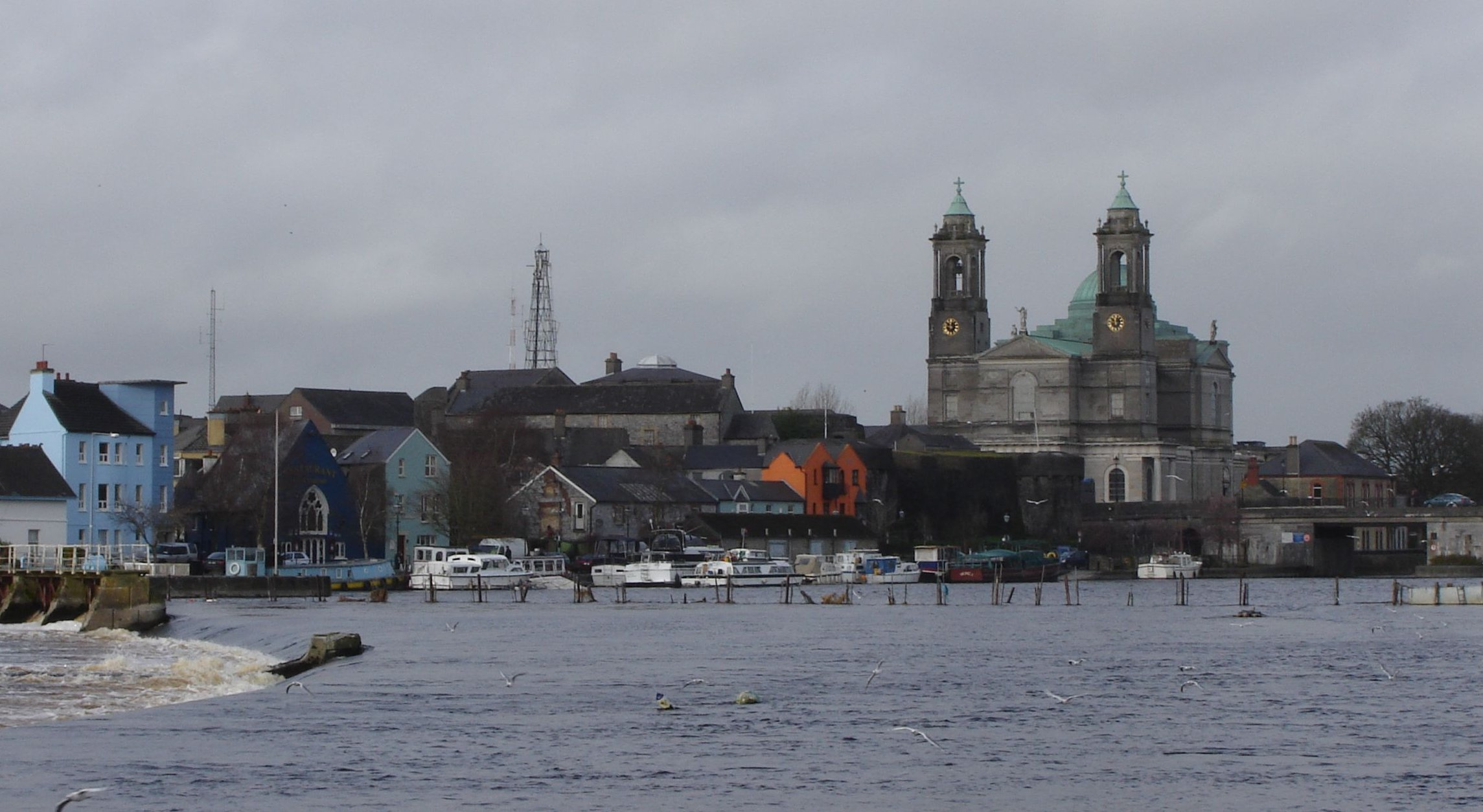
River Shannon and Church of Saints Peter and Paul, Athlone

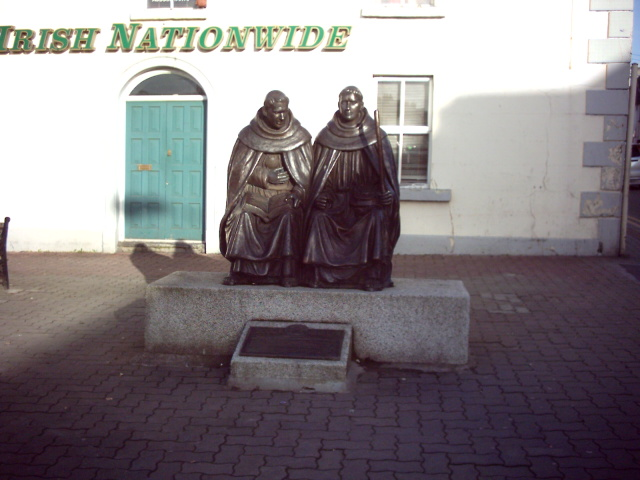
Austin Friars, Mullingar

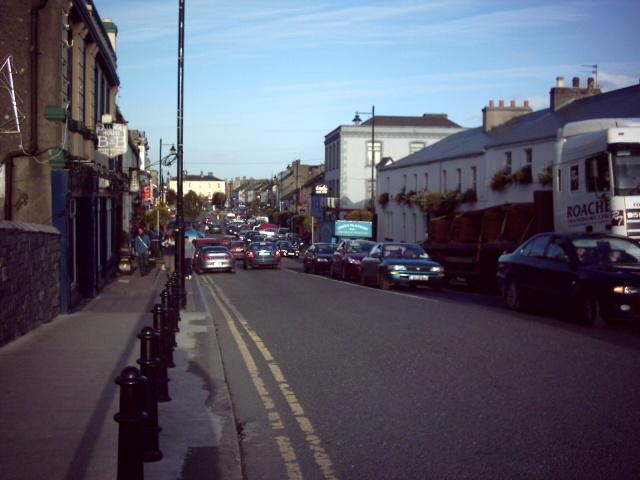
Mullingar Centre

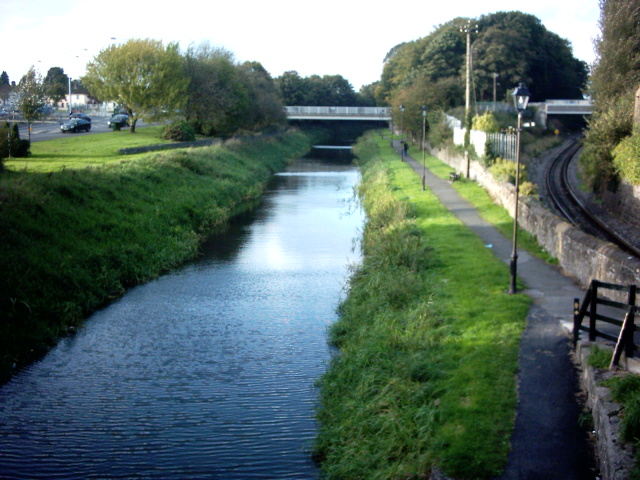
The Royal Canal, Mullingar

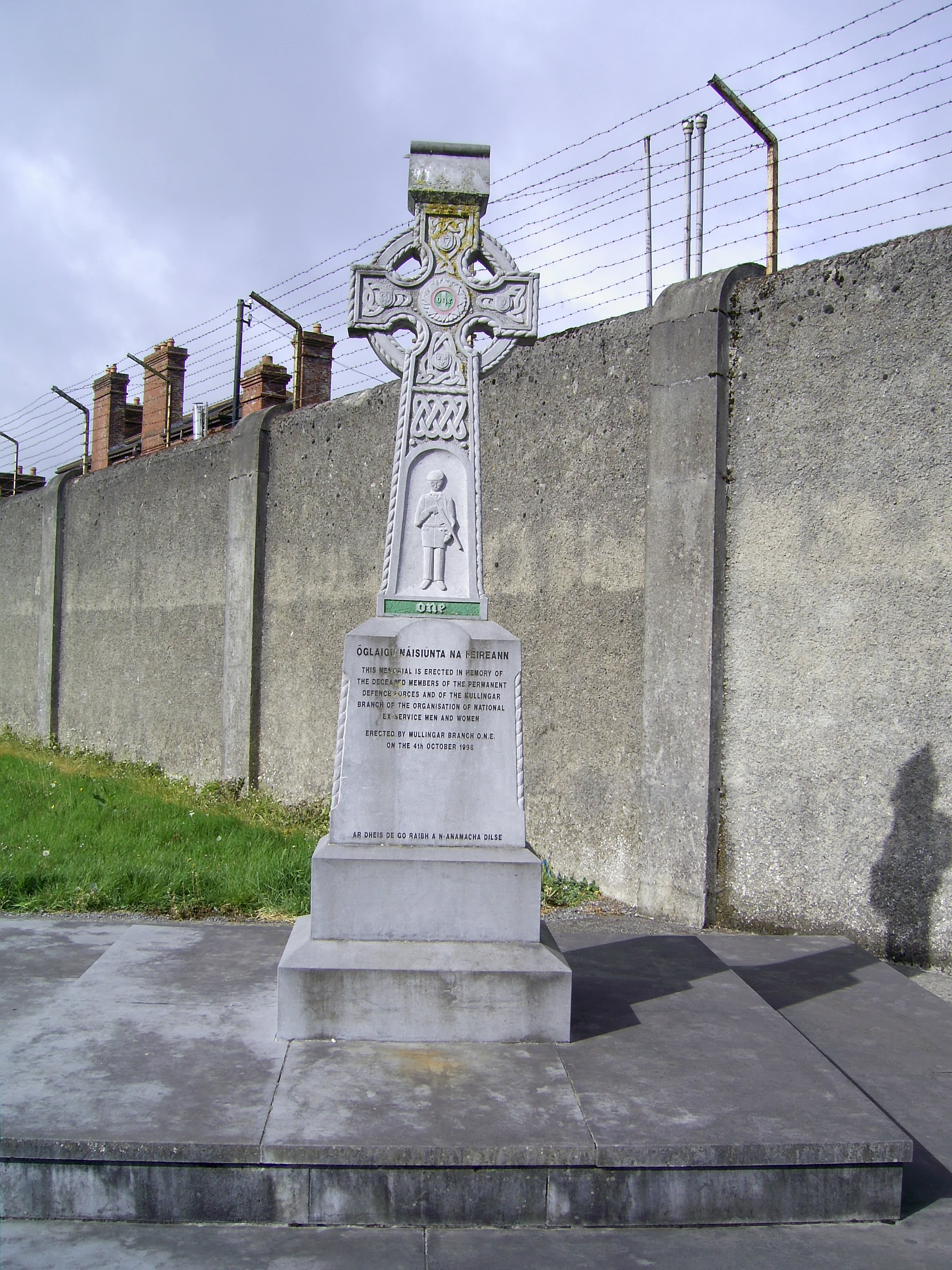
Celtic Cross at Columb
Military Barracks, Mullingar

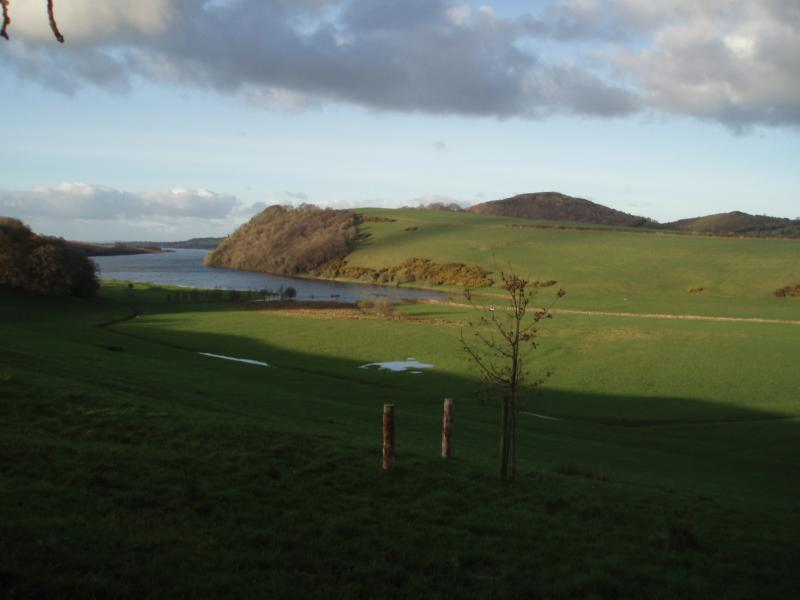
Lough Derravaragh & Knockeyon

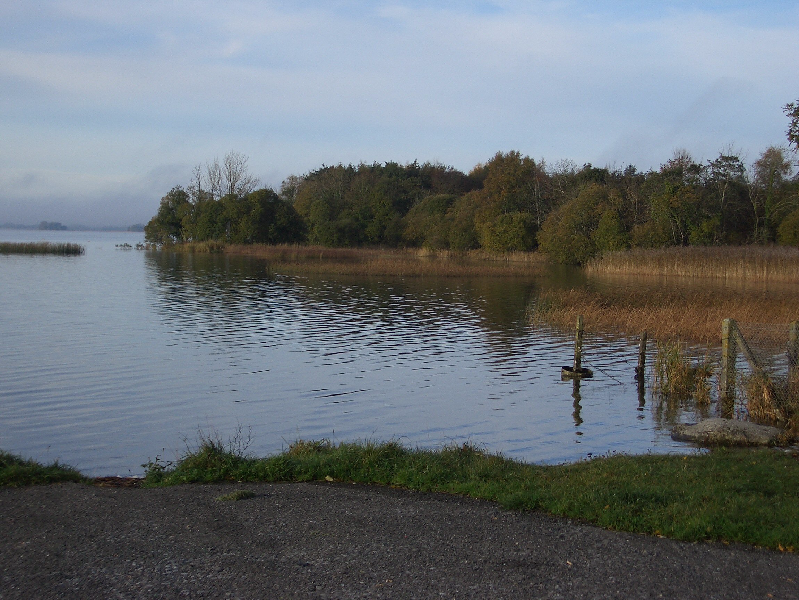
Lough Ennell

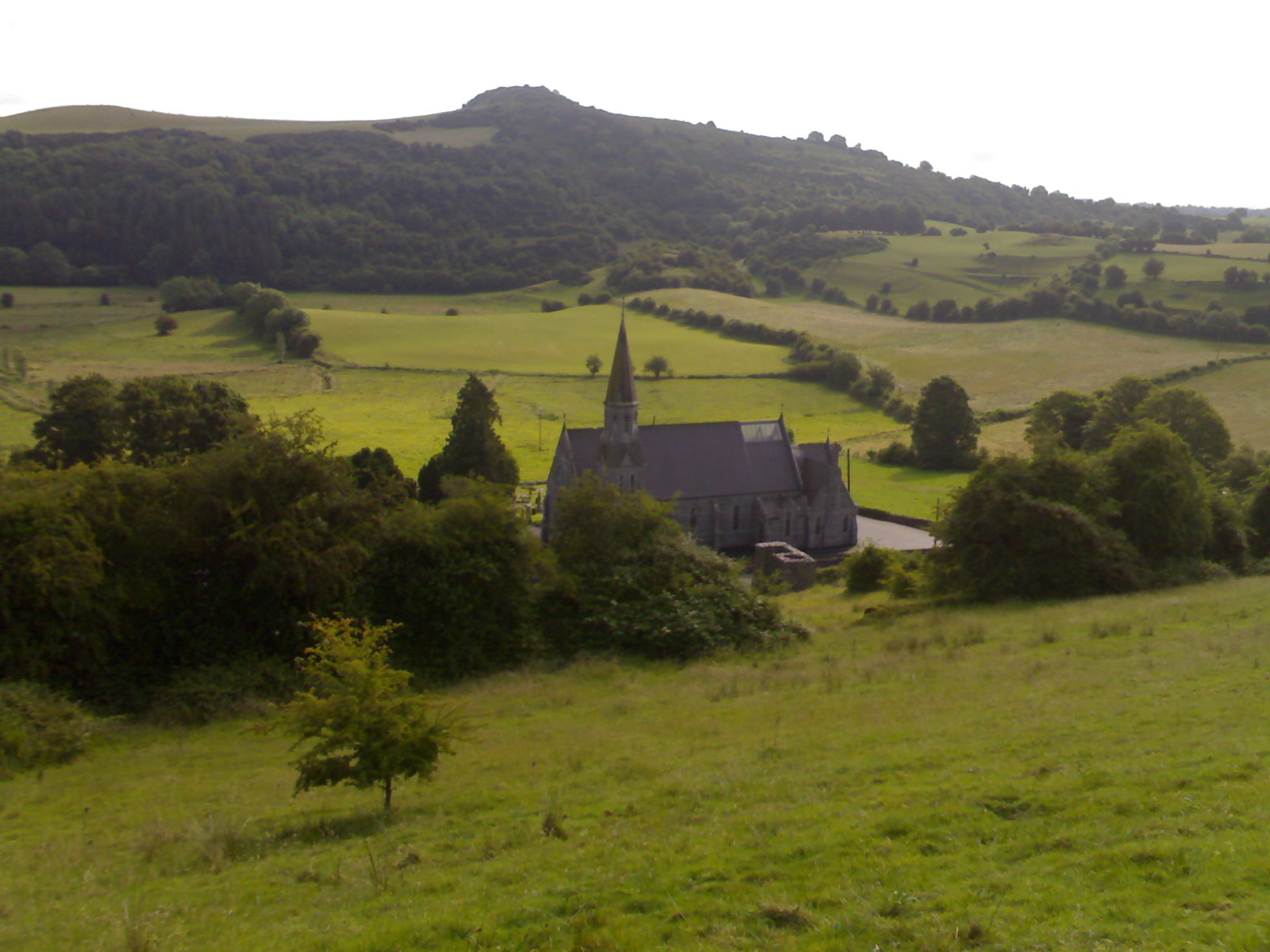
Hill of Ben Fore

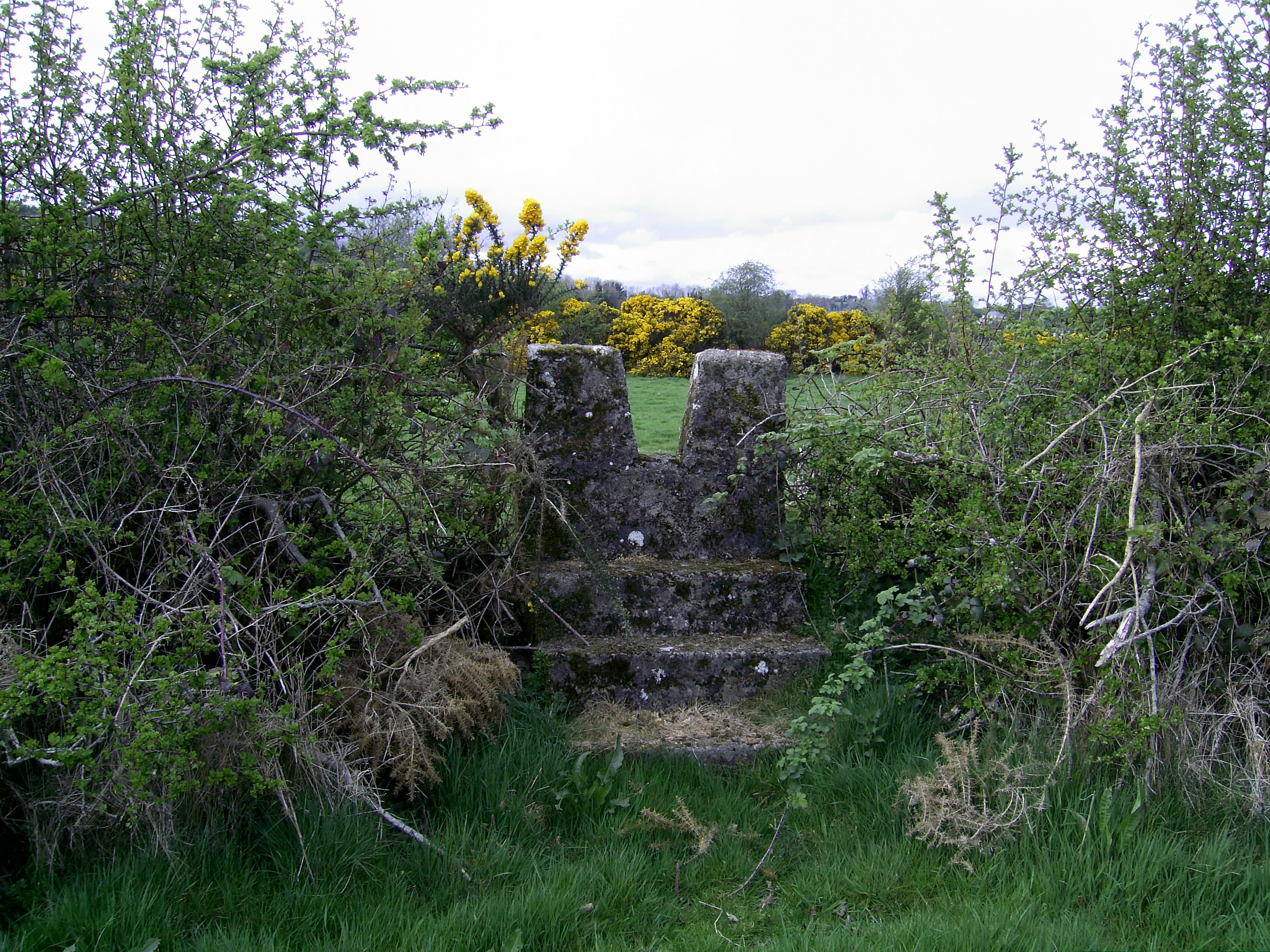
19th century concrete stile, Ranaghan, Collinstown

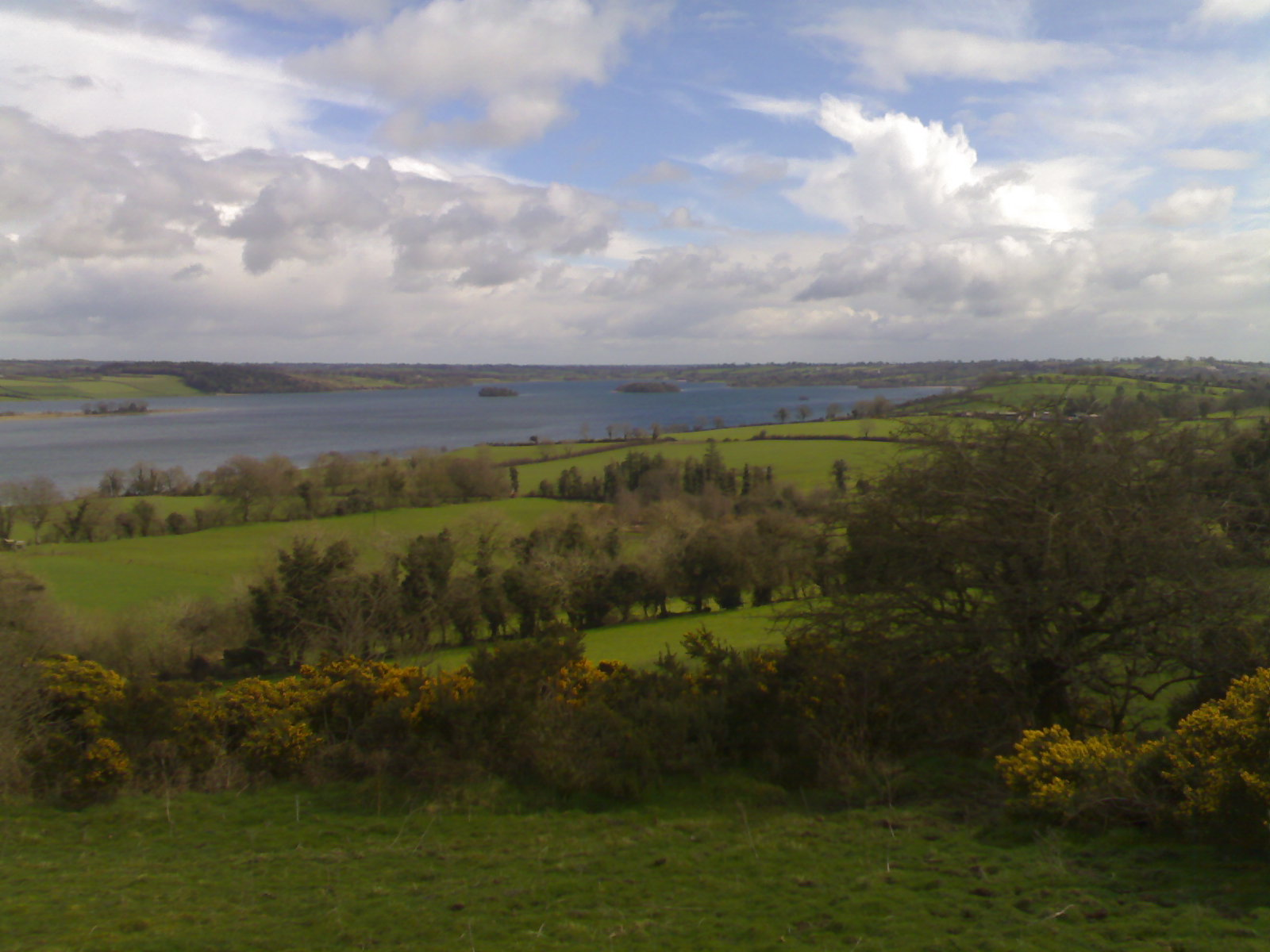
Turgesius Island, Lough Lene

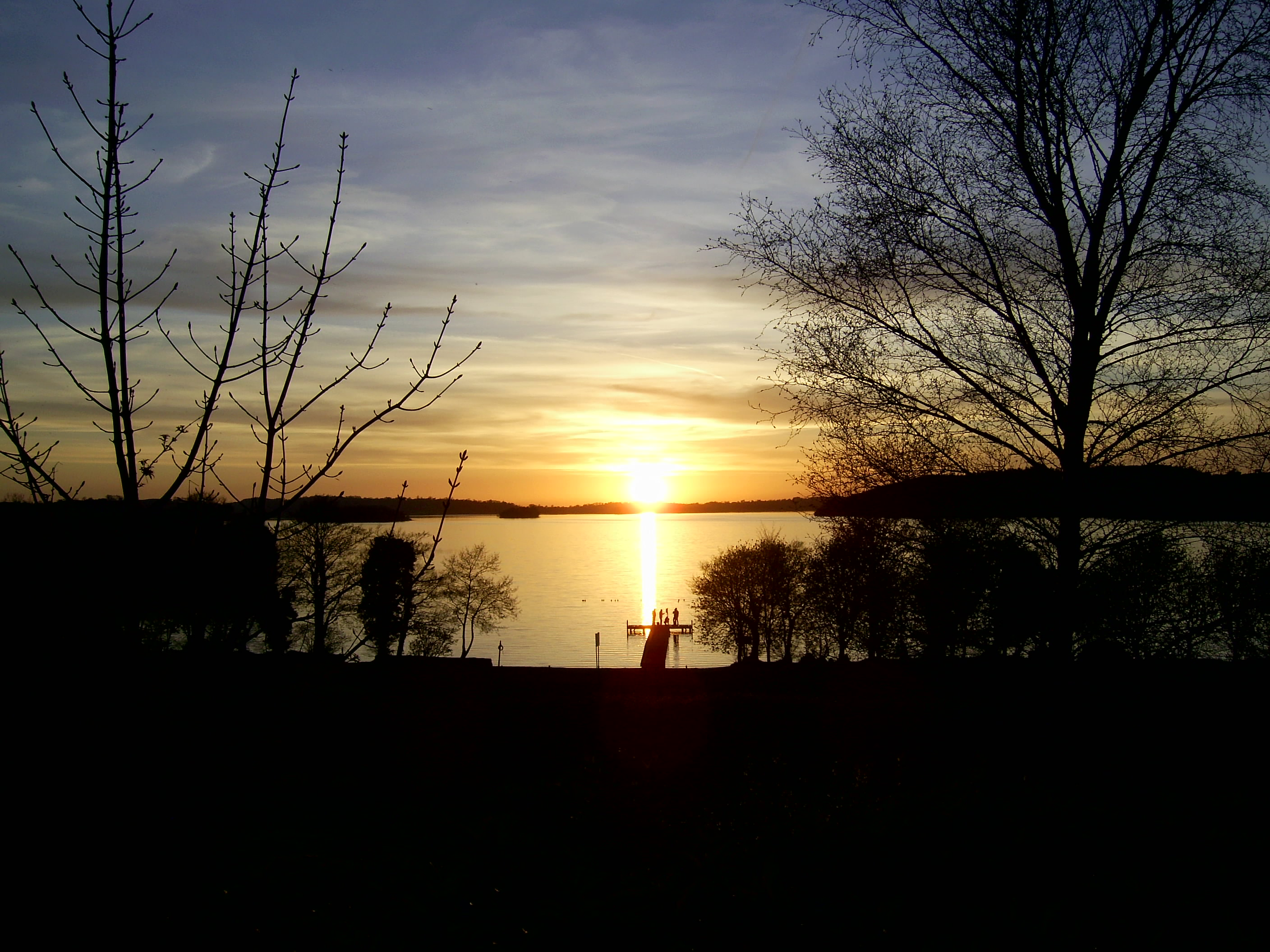
Sunset on Lough Lene

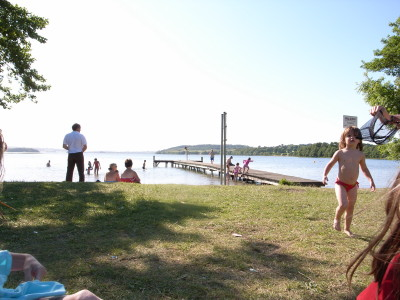
The Cut, Lough Lene

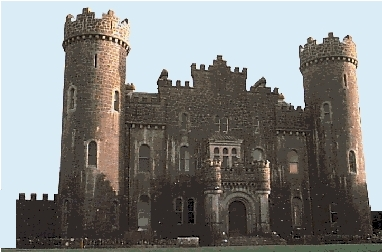
Delvin Castle

== Towns/villages ==
- Athlone
- Ballinahown
- Ballinalack
- Ballykeeran
- Ballymore
- Ballynacargy
- Castledaly
- Castlepollard
- Castletown-Geoghegan
- Clonmellon
- Collinstown
- Coole
- Crookedwood
- Delvin
- Drumcree
- Drumraney
- Finnea
- Fore
- Glassan
- Horseleap
- Kilbeggan
- Killucan and Rathwire
- Kinnegad
- Milltownpass
- Moate
- Mount Temple
- Moyvoughly
- Mullingar, the county town
- Multyfarnham
- Raharney
- Rathconrath
- Rathowen
- Rochfortbridge
- Rosemount
- Streamstown
- Streete
- Tang
- Tubberclare
- Tyrrellspass

== See also ==
- List of abbeys and priories in Ireland (County Westmeath)
- Lord Lieutenant of Westmeath
- High Sheriff of Westmeath
