= Westmeath county hurling team =

Hurling team

Westmeath
- Sport: Hurling
- Irish: An Iarmhí
- Nickname(s): The Lake men
- County board: Westmeath GAA
- Manager: Vacant
- Home venue(s): Cusack Park, Mullingar

Recent competitive record
- Last championship title: None
- Current NHL Division: 1B (7th in 2025; relegated to Division 2)
- Last league title: None
First colours	Second colours

The Westmeath county hurling team represents Westmeath in hurling and is governed by Westmeath GAA, the county board of the Gaelic Athletic Association. The team competes in the Joe McDonagh Cup and the National Hurling League.

Westmeath's home ground is Cusack Park, Mullingar. The team's manager is vacant.

The team has never won the Leinster Senior Championship, the All-Ireland Senior Championship or the National League.

The team is nicknamed the Lake men.

== History ==
The Westmeath hurlers experienced a successful period in the mid-1930s, when they won the Leinster League twice in succession, the Junior Championship in 1936, and beat Laois to qualify for the 1937 Leinster Senior final.

Rickardstown's John 'Jobber' McGrath, who played for the county in the 1950s and 1960s, is regarded as Westmeath's greatest hurler, and as one of the greatest players never to have won an All-Ireland senior hurling title.

Westmeath played in the first division of the National Hurling League in 1985–86 and were the only team to beat Galway in an 18-month period. This team included the three Kilcoyne brothers and produced an All-Star award for David, who was the team's free taker and top scorer in 1986. The first All Star award for any Westmeath player in hurling or football.

In 2005, the county won the first Christy Ring Cup and thereby gained promotion to the 2006 Liam McCarthy Championship. In 2006, they beat Dublin in the first round of the Leinster Senior Hurling Championship before losing the semi-final to Kilkenny in Mullingar by 14 points. They then lost to Waterford, Galway and, disappointingly, Laois before tamely losing a relegation playoff against Dublin on a scorching July day in Tullamore. Despite progress made in 2006, the GAA condemned the county's hurlers to the Christy Ring Cup - this time without the prospect of promotion. Further rule changes and a Christy Ring win in 2010 allowed Westmeath back into the 2011 Liam McCarthy.

Further progress came on 20 April 2008 with victory in the NHL (Division 2), winning the final against Carlow. That day also saw their footballing counterparts move into Division 1 of the NFL also, with a win over Dublin.

In 2015, the Westmeath minor hurlers surprised heavy favorites Wexford by two points in the Leinster quarter-final, the win has been regarded by the manager as the 'biggest result in history of Westmeath hurling'. The senior hurlers beat Carlow by two points in the Leinster Qualifier group and extended their winning run beating favorites, Antrim 1–21 to 0–7.

Westmeath achieved a famous victory over near rivals Offaly in May 2016 during the Leinster Championship. Westmeath led by some distance for the entire game before winning 2–21 to 1–10.

In September 2019, Westmeath announced Shane O'Brien as new manager after Joe Quaid's departure.

Westmeath staged a remarkable 16-point comeback to achieve their first ever championship victory over Wexford in the 2023 Leinster Senior Hurling Championship. Following Joe Fortune's departure as manager in June 2024 after three years, Seoirse Bulfin was confirmed as the new manager in July 2024, with former manager Shane O'Brien announced as having joined his backroom team that October. Bulfin announced his departure as manager after one season, on 10 June 2025.

== Panel ==
Team as per Westmeath vs Kerry in the 2025 Joe McDonagh Cup Round 5 (announced 23 May 2025)

No.	Player	Position	Club
1	Ciarán O'Brien	Goalkeeper
2	Conor Gaffney	Right corner-back
3	Tommy Doyle	Full-back	Lough Lene Gaels
4	Gary Greville	Left corner-back
5	Eoin Keyes	Right half-back
6	Robbie Greville	Centre-back
7	David Hickey	Left half-back
8	Davy Glennon	Midfield	Mullagh (Galway)
9	Eamon Cunneen	Midfield
10	David O'Reilly	Right half-forward
11	David Williams	Centre-forward
12	Mark Cunningham	Left half-forward
13	Peter Clarke	Right corner-forward
14	Niall O'Brien	Full-forward	Castletown Geoghegan
15	Killian Doyle	Left corner-forward

No.	Player	Position	Club
16	Jack Gillen	Substitute	Cullion
17	Joseph Boyle	Substitute	Raharney
18	Aaron Craig	Substitute	St Oliver Plunkett's
19	Matthew Cunningham	Substitute
20	Adam Ennis	Substitute
21	Dean Ennis	Substitute
22	Oisín Loughlin	Substitute
23	Rory Keyes	Substitute
24	Niall Mitchell	Substitute	Clonkill
25	Kevin Regan	Substitute
26	Shane Williams	Substitute	Lough Lene Gaels

^{INJ} Player has had an injury which has affected recent involvement with the county team.
^{RET} Player has since retired from the county team.
^{WD} Player has since withdrawn from the county team due to a non-injury issue.

== Management team ==
- Manager:

== Managerial history ==
- Michael Cosgrove:1999–2001
- Michael Conneely: 2001–2003
- Tom Ryan: 2003–2005
- Séamus Qualter: 2005–2007
- Johnny Dooley: 2007–2008
- Eamonn Gallagher: 2009
- Kevin Martin: 2009–2011
- Brian Hanley: 2011–2014
- Michael Ryan: 2014–2018
- Joe Quaid: 2018–2019
- Shane O'Brien: 2019–2021
- Joe Fortune: 2021–2024
- Seoirse Bulfin: 2024–2025

== Players ==
=== Awards ===
- All Stars:

Westmeath has 1 All Star.

1986: David Kilcoyne

- Champion 15:

denotes that a player also won Player of the Year for the year in question.

2005: Enda McLoughlin, Killian Cosgrove, Andrew Mitchell
2007: Patrick Clarke, Paddy Dowdall, Derek McNicholas
2008: Brendan Murtagh, Paul Greville
2009: Greg Gavin
2010: Andrew Mitchell^{2nd}, Joe Clarke, Paul Greville^{2nd}, Eoin Price
2018: Derek McNicholas^{2nd}, Allan Devine, Paul Greville^{3rd}, Patrick Carroll, Eoin Price^{2nd}
2020: Aonghus Clarke
2021: Darragh Egerton, Aonghus Clarke^{2nd}, Tommy Doyle , Robbie Greville, Davey Glennon, Killian Doyle, Niall Mitchell
2024: Killian Doyle^{2nd}

== Honours ==
=== National ===
- All-Ireland Senior B Hurling Championship
  - (gold) Winners (3): 1975, 1984, 1991
- All-Ireland Junior Hurling Championship
  - (gold) Winners (1): 1936
- Joe McDonagh Cup
  - (gold) Winners (1): 2021
  - (silver) Runners-up (2): 2018, 2019
- Christy Ring Cup
  - (gold) Winners (3): 2005, 2007, 2010
  - (silver) Runners-up (1): 2008
- National Hurling League Division 2A
  - (gold) Winners (3): 2016, 2019, 2022
- National Hurling League Division 2
  - (gold) Winners (1): 2008
- All Ireland Minor B Hurling Championship
  - (gold) Winners (2): 1999, 2010
- All-Ireland Under-21 B Hurling Championship
  - (gold) Winners (2): 2000, 2003

=== Provincial ===
- Leinster Senior Hurling Championship
  - (silver) Runners-up (1): 1937
- Leinster Junior Hurling Championship
  - (gold) Winners (3): 1912, 1936, 1963
- Walsh Cup
  - (gold) Winners (1): 1982
- Kehoe Cup
  - (gold) Winners (9): 1993, 1996, 1998, 2004, 2008, 2009, 2010, 2019, 2022
