= 1992 All-Ireland Senior B Hurling Championship =

- Dates: 10 May - 12 July 1992
- Teams: 11
- Champions: Carlow (1st title); John Byrne (captain); Martin Fitzpatrick (manager)
- Runners-up: London

Tournament statistics
- Matches played: 12
- Goals scored: 55 (4.58 per match)
- Points scored: 275 (22.92 per match)
- Top scorer(s): David Kilcoyne (2-27)

The 1992 All-Ireland Senior B Hurling Championship was the 19th staging of the All-Ireland Senior B Hurling Championship since its establishment by the Gaelic Athletic Association in 1974. The championship ran from 10 May to 12 July 1992.

Westmeath entered the championship as the defending champions, however, they were beaten by Carlow in the All-Ireland home final.

The All-Ireland final was played at the Emerald GAA Grounds in Ruislip on 12 July 1992 between Carlow and London, in what was their second meeting in the All-Ireland final and a first meeting in five years. Carlow won the match by 2-15 to 3-10 to claim their very first All-Ireland title.

Westmeath's David Kilcoyne was the championship's top scorer with 2-27.

== Results ==
=== Bracket ===
Preliminary round
Monaghan | 4–06
Meath | 1–21
Wicklow | 5–07
Kildare | 4–09

Quarter-finals
Roscommon | 2–13, 1–11
Westmeath | 3–10, 3–15
Mayo | 4–08
Sligo | 1–08
Armagh | 0–04
Carlow | 3–13
Meath | 1–11
Wicklow | 2–09

Semi-finals
Westmeath | 5–19
Mayo | 2–12
Carlow | 1–13
Wicklow | 0–12

Home final
Westmeath | 4–05, 0–17
Carlow | 1–14, 3–13
All-Ireland B final
London | 3–10
Carlow | 2–15

=== All-Ireland preliminary round ===
| 10 May 1992 Preliminary round | Monaghan | 4-06 - 1-21 | Meath | Páirc Uí Néill |
| | M Curran 1-4, O Connell 2-0, P McShane 1-0, M O'Dowd 0-2. | | T Duignan 1-9, P Kelly 0-4, P Potterton 0-3, R Kelly 0-2, M Gannon 0-2, P Growney 0-1. |

| 10 May 1992 Preliminary round | Wicklow | 5-07 - 4-09 | Kildare | Pearse Park |
| | D Curran 3-0, D Bury 1-4, T Munroe 1-0, D Hyland 0-1, N Byrne 0-1, S Kennedy 0-1. | | M Moore 3-0, J Kinlan 1-0, J Byrne 0-2, E Kelly 0-2, G Deering 0-1, B O'Hara 0-1, C Byrne 0-1, J Byrne 0-1, G Deery 0-1. |

=== All-Ireland quarter-finals ===
| 24 May 1992 Quarter-final | Roscommon | 2-13 - 3-10 | Westmeath | Athleague Sportsfield |
| | P Lyons 1-4, S Kilroy 1-3, B Boyle 0-2, A Kelly 0-2, P Dolan 0-1, M Cunniffe 0-1. | | D Kilcoyne 1-6, D Gillen 1-0, S McLoughlin 1-0, A Weir 0-2, R Galvin 0-2. |

| 24 May 1992 Quarter-final | Mayo | 4-08 - 1-08 | Sligo | Ballyhaunis Grounds |
| | J Henry 0-7, M Trench 1-1, Dom Greally 1-0, Declan Greally 1-0, K Doyle 1-0. | | H Cox 1-2, P Severs 0-3, T Brennan 0-2, P Galvin 0-1. |

| 24 May 1992 Quarter-final | Meath | 1-11 - 2-09 | Wicklow | Páirc Tailteann |
| | T Duignan 1-8, P Kelly 0-1, D Martin 0-1, P Potterton 0-1. | | S Byrne 1-0, D Curran 1-0, D Bury 0-2, D Hyland 0-2, C O'Brien 0-2, N Cremin 0-1, N Goggin 0-1, S Kennedy 0-1. |

| 24 May 1992 Quarter-final | Armagh | 0-04 - 3-13 | Carlow | Keady Grounds |
| | S Hughes 0-1, P Devlin 0-1, P Lennon 0-1, C Shine 0-1. | | B Hayden 1-3, D Doyle 1-1, C Jordan 1-1, M Mullins 0-4, J Hayden 0-2, P Brennan 0-1, P Murphy 0-1. | Referee: T McIntyre (Down) |

| 31 May 1992 Quarter-final replay | Westmeath | 3-15 - 1-11 | Roscommon | Cusack Park |
| | D Kilcoyne 0-8, A Devine 1-2, S McLoughlin 1-0, J Kennedy 1-0, P Clancy 0-2, R Galvin 0-2, J Coyne 0-1. | | S Kilroy 1-7, A Kelly 0-2, D Coyle 0-1, P Lyons 0-1. |

=== All-Ireland semi-finals ===
| 7 June 1992 Semi-final | Westmeath | 5-19 - 2-12 | Mayo | Athleague Sportsfield |
| | D Kilcoyne 1-7, S McLoughlin 1-4, P Clancy 1-3, R Galvin 1-1, J Kennedy 1-0, A Weir 0-1, B Kennedy 0-1, E Gallagher 0-1, J Coyne 0-1. | | J Henry 1-7, T Greally 1-0, J Cunnane 0-2, M Trench 0-2, C Collins 0-1. | Referee: J Cody (Galway) |

| 14 June 1992 Semi-final | Carlow | 1-13 - 0-12 | Wicklow | Croke Park |
| | B Hayden 0-7, M Mullins 1-0, J McDonald 0-3, D Doyle 0-1, J Byrne 0-1, P Murphy 0-1. | | N Bury 0-4, C O'Keeffe 0-3, D Curran 0-2, N Goggin 0-1, S Byrne 0-1, D Hyland 0-1. |

=== All-Ireland home final ===
| 20 June 1992 Final | Carlow | 1-14 - 4-05 | Westmeath | O'Connor Park |
| | M Mullins 1-6, B Hayden 0-3, J Hayden 0-3, J McDonald 0-1, D Doyle 0-1. | | R Galvin 2-0, S McLoughlin 1-1, B Kennedy 1-1, E Gallagher 0-2, D Kilcoyne 0-1. |

| 27 June 1992 Final replay | Carlow | 3-13 - 0-17 | Westmeath | O'Connor Park |
| | M Mullins 1-5, J Hayden 1-3, P Murphy 1-1, J McDonald 0-3, D Doyle 0-1. | | D Kilcoyne 0-5, E Gallagher 0-4, B McCabe 0-3, S McLoughlin 0-2, B Kennedy 0-1, J Coyne 0-1, R Galvin 0-1. | Referee: W Barrett (Tipperary) |

=== All-Ireland final ===
| 12 July 1992 Final | London | 3-10 - 2-15 | Carlow | Emerald GAA Grounds |
| | P Lynch 1-2, J Murphy 1-2, M McGrath 1-2, D Doyle 0-2, K Morrissey 0-2, S O'Leary 0-1, D McKenna 0-1. | | J Hayden 1-3, M Mullins 0-4, B Hayden 1-0, C Jordan 0-3, J Byrne 0-1, P Murphy 0-1, J McDonald 0-1. | Referee: K Walsh (Clare) |

== Championship statistics ==
=== Top scorers ===
Overall

| Rank | Player | Team | Tally | Total | Matches | Average |
|---|---|---|---|---|---|---|
| 1 | David Kilcoyne | Westmeath | 2-27 | 33 | 5 | 6.60 |
| 2 | Mark Mullins | Carlow | 3-19 | 28 | 5 | 5.60 |
| 3 | Tom Duignan | Meath | 2-17 | 23 | 2 | 11.50 |
| 4 | Seán McLoughlin | Westmeath | 4-07 | 19 | 5 | 3.80 |
| 4 | Brendan Hayden | Carlow | 2-13 | 19 | 5 | 3.80 |
| 6 | Joe Hayden | Carlow | 2-11 | 17 | 5 | 3.40 |
| 6 | Joe Henry | Mayo | 1-14 | 17 | 2 | 8.50 |
| 8 | Séamus Kilroy | Roscommon | 2-10 | 16 | 2 | 8.00 |
| 9 | Danny Curran | Wicklow | 4-00 | 12 | 2 | 6.00 |
| 10 | Mick Moore | Kildare | 3-00 | 9 | 1 | 9.00 |

In a single game

| Rank | Player | Team | Tally | Total | Opposition |
|---|---|---|---|---|---|
| 1 | Tom Duignan | Meath | 1-09 | 12 | Monaghan |
| 2 | Tom Duignan | Meath | 1-08 | 11 | Wicklow |
| 3 | Séamus Kilroy | Roscommon | 1-07 | 10 | Westmeath |
| 3 | David Kilcoyne | Westmeath | 1-07 | 10 | Mayo |
| 3 | Joe Henry | Mayo | 1-07 | 10 | Westmeath |
| 6 | Danny Curran | Wicklow | 3-00 | 9 | Kildare |
| 6 | Mick Moore | Kildare | 3-00 | 9 | Wicklow |
| 6 | David Kilcoyne | Westmeath | 1-06 | 9 | Roscommon |
| 6 | Mark Mullins | Carlow | 1-06 | 9 | Westmeath |
| 10 | Mark Mullins | Carlow | 1-05 | 8 | Westmeath |
| 10 | David Kilcoyne | Westmeath | 0-08 | 8 | Roscommon |
