= 1993–94 National Hurling League =

63rd season of the National Hurling League

League details
- Dates: 17 October 1993 – 8 May 1994
- Teams: 32

League champions
- Winners: Tipperary (16th win)
- Captain: George Frend
- Manager: Babs Keating

League runners-up
- Runners-up: Galway
- Captain: Gerry McInerney
- Manager: Jarlath Cloonan

Other division winners
- Division 2: Clare
- Division 3: Carlow
- Division 4: Louth

The 1993–94 National Hurling League was the 63rd edition of the National Hurling League, which ran from 17 October 1993 until 8 May 1994.

Thirty-two teams participated in the league, comprising four divisions of eight teams. Two points were awarded for a win and one point was awarded for a drawn game. The knock-out phase featured the top four teams from division one and the top two teams from division two.

Tipperary won the league, beating Galway by 2–14 to 0–12 in the final.

== Overview ==
=== Division 1 ===
The National Hurling League's top division featured eight teams. Galway, the 1993 All-Ireland runners-up, suffered just one defeat, topped the group and guaranteed themselves a place in the National League semi-final. Reigning league champions Cork finished second and booked their place in the second semi-final. Third placed Tipperary and fourth placed Antrim secured their places in the league quarter-finals. In spite of finished third, Tipperary defeated Galway in the National League final to secure their 16th title. It was the team's last silverware under the management of Michael "Babs" Keating.

Down at the other end of the table, Waterford, with five defeats, and Wexford, with six defeats, were relegated to Division 2 for the following season.

=== Division 2 ===
In Division 2, Clare and reigning All-Ireland champions Kilkenny finished first and second respectively, thus securing automatic promotion to Division 1 for the following season. They also earned a place in the National League quarter-finals.

Westmeath, who only managed one draw during the group stage, were automatically relegated to Division 3.

=== Division 3 ===
Carlow finished the group stage without defeat, topping the group with 14 points. Their success ensured automatic promotion to Division 2.

Mayo lost all seven of their group games, finishing with a points difference of -100, and were relegated to Division 4.

=== Division 4 ===
Louth were the standard bearers in Division 4. They recorded six wins from seven games, thus ensuring their promotion to Division 3 for the 1994-95 National Hurling League.

Cavan lost all seven of their group games, finishing with a points difference of -116. They had the dubious honour of being the worst hurling team in Ireland.

== Division 1 ==
National Hurling League Division 1
- Season: 1993-94
- Champions: Tipperary; 16th National League title Captain: George Frend; Manager: Babs Keating
- Relegated: Waterford; Wexford
- Matches: 33
- Top goalscorer: Paul Flynn (0-39)
- Biggest home win: Galway 4-10 - 0-09 Waterford (17 February 1994)
- Biggest away win: Antrim 1-12 - 4-17 Tipperary (17 October 1993); Down 0-10 - 3-15 Cork (20 March 1994)
- Highest scoring: Cork 2-21 - 3-11 Antrim (31 October 1993)
- All statistics correct as of 18 February 2017.

For the second time in three years, the league saw a major restructuring. The twelve-team Division 1 which was split into two groups of six was abolished in favour of a single eight-team division.

Cork came into the season as defending champions of the 1992-93 season.

On 8 May 1994, Tipperary won the title after a 2–14 to 0–12 win over Galway in the final. It was their 16th league title overall and their first since 1987-88.

Waterford and Wexford were relegated from Division 1.

Waterford's Paul Flynn was the Division 1 top scorer with 0-39.

=== Table ===
Pos	Team	Pld	W	D	L	Diff	Pts	Notes
1	Galway	7	5	1	1	29	11	National Hurling League runners-up
2	Cork	7	5	0	2	34	10	
3	Tipperary	7	5	0	2	23	10	National Hurling League champions
4	Antrim	7	4	1	2	-8	9	
5	Limerick	7	3	2	2	6	8	
6	Down	7	1	2	4	-33	4	
7	Waterford	7	0	2	5	-24	2	Relegated to Division 2
8	Wexford	7	1	0	6	-38	2	Relegated to Division 2

=== Group stage ===
17 October 1993	Galway	2-14 - 1-10	Wexford	Kenny Park, Athenry
	C Helebert 2-0, M Headd 0-5, J Rabbitte 0-4, F Forde 0-2, T Kirwan 0-1, M Coleman 0-1, B Keogh 0-1.		B Byrne 0-7, L O'Gorman 1-2, T Keogh 0-1.	Referee: W Barrett (Tipperary)

17 October 1993	Limerick	1-13 - 0-13	Cork	Gaelic Grounds, Limerick
	S O'Neill 1-1, G Kirby 0-4, M Houlihan 0-4, F Carroll 0-1, C Carey 0-1, D Clarke 0-1, M Wallace 0-1.		B Egan 0-6, T Mulcahy 0-4, P Buckley 0-3.	Referee: P Horan (Offaly)

17 October 1993	Antrim	1-12 - 4-17	Tipperary	Casement Park, Belfast
	S McMullen 1-1, Gregory O'Kane 0-2, S McKillop 0-2, A Elliott 0-2, P McKillen 0-1, C McCambridge 0-1, R Donnelly 0-1, Gary O'Kane 0-1, J Close 0-1.		J Leahy 1-5, B Carroll 1-4, S Dwan 0-6, P Fox 1-1, A Ryan 1-0, G McGuire 0-1.	Referee: S O'Meara (Offaly)

17 October 1993	Waterford	0-11 - 1-8	Down	Walsh Park, Waterford
	P Flynn 0-5, T Browne 0-2, T Fives 0-1, J Beresford 0-1, B O'Sullivan 0-1, S Daly 0-1.		M Blaney 1-1, G Savage 0-2, D O'Prey 0-2, C Mageean 0-1, N Sands 0-1, M Baille 0-1.	Referee: P Delaney (Laois)

31 October 1993	Tipperary	1-17 - 3-8	Limerick	Semple Stadium, Thurles
	J Leahy 1-4, S Dwan 0-7, B Carroll 0-2, P Fox 0-2, G Dealy 0-1, B O'Meara 0-1.		G Kirby 1-4, T Herbert 1-0, L O'Connor 1-0, F Carroll 0-2, C Carey 0-1, S O'Neill 0-1.	Referee: D Murphy (Wexford)

31 October 1993	Wexford	1-13 - 1-12	Waterford	O'Kennedy Park, New Ross
	T Demspey 0-8, M Storey 0-5, P Carton 1-0.		P Flynn 0-7, G Harris 1-1, J Beresford 0-2, B O'Sullivan 0-1, T Browne 0-1.	Referee: S Guinan (Kilkenny)

31 October 1993	Down	2-9 - 2-15	Galway	Mitchell Park, Ballygalget
	M Branniff 1-1, N Sands 1-0, D o'Prey 0-3, B Coulter 0-2, C Mageean 0-2, M Baille 0-1.		L Burke 1-6, L Turley 1-1, F Forde 0-2, B Keogh 0-2, M Donoghue 0-1, N Shaughnessy 0-1, J Rabbitte 0-1, V Treacy 0-1.	Referee: P Horan (Offaly)

31 October 1993	Cork	2-21 - 3-11	Antrim	Páirc Uí Rinn, Cork
	B Egan 1-6, M Mullins 0-8, P O'Callaghan 1-0, T Kelleher 0-2, S McCarthy 0-2, B McCarthy 0-1, F McCormack 0-1, A White 0-1.		J Carson 2-0, SP McKillop 1-2, C McCambridge 0-4, C McDonnell 0-2, S McMullen 0-1, P McKillen 0-1, J Connolly 0-1.	Referee: S McMahon (Clare)

14 November 1993	Waterford	0-10 - 0-11	Tipperary	Cappoquin Sportsfield, Cappoquin
	P Flynn 0-5, T Fives 0-2, L O'Connor 0-1, M Hubbard 0-1, J Beresford 0-1.		S Dwan 0-4, A Ryan 0-3, D Carr 0-1, G Maguire 0-1, C Bonnar 0-1, B Carroll 0-1.	Referee: P O'Connor (Limerick)

14 November 1993	Cork	0-13 - 0-15	Galway	Páirc Uí Chaoimh, Cork
	B Egan 0-6, J Cashman 0-2, M Mullins 0-2, T Mulcahy 0-1, S McCarthy 0-1, C Casey 0-1.		M Headd 0-6, M Coleman 0-3, J Rabbitte 0-3, C O'Donovan 0-1, F Forde 0-1, P Malone 0-1.	Referee: S O'Meara (Offaly)

14 November 1993	Limerick	1-12 - 1-9	Wexford	FitzGerald Park, Kilmallock
	M Houlihan 1-2, G Kirby 0-4, M Galligan 0-2, T Herbert 0-2, M Carroll 0-1, L Connor 0-1.		L O'Gorman 0-3, J O'Connor 1-0, T Dempsey 0-2, M Storey 0-1, A Fenlon 0-1, E Scallan 0-1, B Byrne 0-1.	Referee: J O'Leary (Cork)

14 November 1993	Antrim	2-12 - 2-12	Down	Casement Park, Belfast
	A Elliott 2-2, C McCambridge 0-3, Gary O'Kane 0-2, J Carson 0-2, P McKillen 0-2, J Connolly 0-1.		D O'Prey 0-8, N Sands 1-1, M Blaney 1-0, G Savage 0-1, B Coulter 0-1, M Baille 0-1.	Referee: T Murray (Limerick)

13 February 1994	Tipperary	1-11 - 3-12	Galway	MacDonagh Park, Nenagh
	T English 1-1, S Dwan 0-4, M Cleary 0-2, A Crosse 0-1, G Maguire 0-1, J McCormack 0-1, J Leahy 0-1.		L Burke 1-4, L Turley 1-2, B Keogh 1-1, N Shaughnessy 0-2, M Coleman 0-2, J Rabbitte 0-1.	Referee: P Delaney (Laois)

13 February 1994	Down	0-9 - 1-13	Limerick	Mitchell Park, Ballygalget
	J McCrickard 0-4, M Baille 0-1, N Sands 0-1, C Mageean 0-1, M Coulter 0-1, B Milligan 0-1.		L O'Connor 1-1, P Heffernan 0-4, F Carroll 0-3, Ccarey 0-2, TJ Rayn 0-2, S O'Neill 0-1.	Referee: A Mac Suibhne (Dublin)

13 February 1994	Wexford	2-8 - 3-7	Antrim	Páirc Uí Síocháin, Gorey
	M Storey 2-1, T Demspey 0-3, E Scallon 0-3, T Dunne 0-1.		SP McKillop 3-1, G O'Kane 0-3, J Carson 0-2, P McKillen 0-1.	Referee: W Barrett (Tipperary)

13 February 1994	Cork	1-8 - 0-5	Waterford	Páirc Uí Chaoimh, Cork
	G Manley 1-4, C Casey 0-2, T Mulcahy 0-1, B Egan 0-1.		S Frampton 0-2, T Browne 0-2, P Prendergast 0-1.	Referee: D Murphy (Wexford)

27 February 1994	Antrim	1-11 - 1-7	Limerick	Casement Park, Belfast
	Gregory O'Kane 0-5, J Carson 1-0, Gary O'Kane 0-3, J Connolly 0-2, SP McKillop 0-1.		F Carroll 1-1, M Houlihan 0-2, L O'Connor 0-1, G Kirby 0-1, T Herbert 0-1.	Referee: P Horan (Offaly)

27 February 1994	Galway	4-10 - 0-9	Waterford	Ballinasloe Sportfield, Ballinasloe
	B Keogh 2-2, F Forde 2-0, J Rabbitte 0-4, J Cooney 0-2, M Coleman 0-1, P Malone 0-1.		P Flynn 0-6, T Browne 0-1, B O'Sullivan 0-1, J Meaney 0-1.	Referee: P O'Connor (Limerick)

27 February 1994	Tipperary	0-15 - 0-17	Cork	Semple Stadium, Thurles
	S Dwan 0-5, J Leahy 0-3, P O'Keeffe 0-3, A Crosse 0-2, N English 0-1, G Deeley 0-1.		G Manley 0-7, P Buckley 0-4, B Egan 0-4, T McCarthy 0-1, M Mullins 0-1.	Referee: S McMahon (Clare)

6 March 1994	Limerick	1-9 - 1-9	Galway	Gaelic Grounds, Limerick
	M Galligan 1-2, G Kirby 0-5, D Clarke 0-1, F Carroll 0-1.		L Burke 0-5, M Headd 1-1, J Rabbitte 0-1, B Keogh 0-1, F Forde 0-1.	Referee: G Harrington (Cork)

6 March 1994	Cork	2-12 - 1-5	Wexford	Páirc Uí Chaoimh, Cork
	G Manley 2-4, T O'Sullivan 0-2, T Kelleher 0-1, C Casey 0-1, M Mullins 0-1, P Buckley 0-1, T McCarthy 0-1, T Mulcahy 0-1.		E Cleary 1-0, M Storey 0-2, L O'Leary 0-1, T Kehoe 0-1, E Scallan 0-1.	Referee: T Lyons (Limerick)

6 March 1994	Tipperary	3-12 - 3-2	Down	Semple Stadium, Thurles
	S Dwan 2-2, M Cleary 0-5, J Leahy 1-1, N English 0-2, B O'Meara 0-1, J McCormack 0-1.		B Coulter 1-1, J McCarthy 1-0, B Milligan 1-0, C Mageean 0-1.	Referee: J O'Leary (Cork)

6 March 1994	Antrim	1-11 - 0-11	Waterford	Casement Park, Belfast
	A Elliott 1-2, P McKillen 0-3, J Carson 0-2, Gregory O'Kane 0-2, SP McKillop 0-1, Conor McCambridge 0-1.		P Flynn 0-7, A Qualter 0-2, K Walsh 0-2.	Referee: J Guinan (Kilkenny)

13 March 1994	Down	2-12 - 2-8	Wexford	McKenna PArk, Ballycran
	C Mageean 1-5, N Sands 1-2, M Branniff 0-3, D Woods 0-1, D Coulter 0-1.		M Storey 1-1, E CLeary 1-1, T Dempsey 0-3, C McBride 0-2, L O'Gorman 0-1.	Referee: S O'Meara (Offaly)

20 March 1994	Galway	0-8 - 1-9	Antrim	Ballinasloe Sportsfield, Ballinasloe
	L Burke 0-3, C O'Doherty 0-2, D Fahy 0-1, N Shaughnessy 0-1, F Forde 0-1.		Gregory O'Kane 0-5, Gary O'Kane 1-0, A Elliott 0-2, SP McKillop 0-1, P McKillen 0-1.	Referee: T Murray (Limerick)

20 March 1994	Wexford	1-14 - 1-17	Tipperary	Enniscorthy
	A Fenlon 0-5, M Storey 0-5, D McDonald 1-0, E Scallan 0-3, C McBride 0-1.		M Cleary 1-9, J Leahy 0-4, L McGrath 0-2, T Dunne 0-1, A Crosse 0-1.	Referee: P Horan (Offaly)

20 March 1994	Waterford	1-13 - 1-13	Limerick	Walsh Park, Waterford
	P Flynn 0-9, A Qualter 1-0, T Browne 0-1, K Walsh 0-1, B O'Sullivan 0-1.		G Kirby 0-5, TJ Ryan 1-0, M Galligan 0-2, B Finn 0-2, P Heffernan 0-1, C Carey 0-1, G Galvin 0-1, F Carroll 0-1.	Referee: D Murphy (Wexford)

20 March 1994	Down	0-10 - 3-15	Cork	Newcastle
	C Mageean 0-4, M Branniff 0-2, K Coulter 0-1, D Woods 0-1, B Coulter 0-1, N Sands 0-1.		G Manley 1-2, T O'Sullivan 0-5, T Mulcahy 1-1, P Buckley 1-0, M Mullins 0-3, S McCarthy 0-2, K Murray 0-2.	Referee: P Delaney (Laois)

=== Knock-out stage ===
Quarter-finals

10 April 1994 Quarter-final	Antrim	0-10 - 2-17	Clare	Croke Park, Dublin
	P Jennings 0-6, G O'Kane 0-1, SP McKillop 0-1, A Elliott 0-1, Conor McCambridge 0-1.		A Whelan 1-4, D Considine 1-3, J O'Connor 0-6, S Sheedy 0-1, T Guilfoyle 0-1, J McInerney 0-1, G O'Loughlin 0-1.	Attendance: 9,705; Referee: P Delaney

10 April 1994 Quarter-final	Kilkenny	1-12 - 2-18	Tipperary	Croke Park, Dublin
	DJ Carey 1-2, A Ronan 0-4, E Morrissey 0-3, L McCarthy 0-1, PJ Delaney 0-1, D O'Neill 0-1.		N English 1-3, M Cleary 0-6, P Fox 1-2, M Nolan 0-2, L McGrath 0-2, A Crosse 0-2, P King 0-1.	Attendance: 9,705; Referee: T Murray (Limerick)

Semi-finals

24 April 1994 Semi-final	Clare	0-10 - 1-13	Galway	Semple Stadium, Thurles
	J O'Connor 0-6, A Whelan 0-2, S Sheedy 0-1, G O'Loughlin 0-1.		N Shaughnessy 1-2, J Campbell 0-3, J Cooney 0-2, J Rabbitte 0-2, N Power 0-1, P Kelly 0-1, M Coleman 0-1, M McGrath 0-1.	Attendance: 14,000; Referee: W Barrett (Tipperary)

1 May 1994 Semi-final	Cork	1-13 - 2-13	Tipperary	Páirc Uí Chaoimh, Cork
	G Manley 0-6, S McCarthy 1-0, T O'Sullivan 0-3, M Mullins 0-2, C Casey 0-1.		M Cleary 0-8, N English 1-3, A Crosse 1-0, J Leahy 0-2.	Attendance: 17,445; Referee: D Murphy (Wexford)

Final

8 May 1994 Final	Tipperary	2-14 - 0-12	Galway	Gaelic Grounds, Limerick
	D Ryan 2-1, J Leahy 0-7, M Cleary 0-3, P King 0-1, J Hayes 0-1, L McGrath 0-1.		L Burke 0-6, P Kelly 0-2, B Keogh 0-1, M McGrath 0-1, J Campbell 0-1, P Malone 0-1.	Attendance: 26,100; Referee: D Murphy (Wexford)

=== Scoring statistics ===
Top scorers overall

Rank	Player	Team	Tally	Total	Matches	Average
1	Paul Flynn	Waterford	0-39	39	7	5.57
2	John Leahy	Tipperary	3-27	36	9	4.00
2	Michael Cleary	Tipperary	1-33	36	8	4.50
4	Ger Manley	Cork	4-23	35	5	7.00
5	Stephen Dwan	Tipperary	2-28	34	6	5.66
6	Liam Burke	Galway	2-24	30	7	4.28
7	Barry Egan	Cork	1-23	26	5	5.20
7	Gary Kirby	Limerick	1-23	26	7	3.71
9	Martin Storey	Wexford	3-15	24	6	4.00
10	Seán Paul McKillop	Antrim	4-09	21	7	3.00

Top scorers in a single game

Rank	Player	Team	Tally	Total	Opposition
1	Michael Cleary	Tipperary	1-09	12	Wexford
2	Seán Paul McKillop	Antrim	3-01	10	Wexford
2	Ger Manley	Cork	2-04	10	Wexford
4	Liam Burke	Galway	1-06	9	Down
4	Barry Egan	Cork	1-06	9	Antrim
4	Paul Flynn	Waterford	0-09	9	Limerick
7	Alistair Elliott	Antrim	2-02	8	Down
7	Brendan Keogh	Galway	2-02	8	Waterford
7	Stephen Dwan	Tipperary	2-02	8	Down
7	John Leahy	Tipperary	1-05	8	Antrim
7	Chris Mageean	Down	1-05	8	Wexford
7	Tom Dempsey	Wexford	0-08	8	Waterford
7	Mark Mullins	Cork	0-08	8	Antrim
7	Dermot O'Prey	Down	0-08	8	Antrim
7	Michael Cleary	Tipperary	0-08	8	Cork

== Division 2 ==
National Hurling League Division 2
- Season: 1993-94
- Champions: Clare
- Promoted: Clare; Kilkenny
- Relegated: Westmeath
- Matches: 28
- Top goalscorer: Aonghus O'Grady (2-38)
- Biggest home win: Offaly 2-15 - 0-7 Meath (13 March 1994)
- Biggest away win: Meath 0-7 - 4-11 Laois (6 March 1994)
- Highest scoring: Kerry 2-11 - 3-15 Meath (14 November 1993)
- All statistics correct as of 18 February 2017.

In spite of a major restructuring of the league, Division 2 remained as a single unit consisting of eight teams.

Laois came into the season as defending champions of the 1992-93 season.

On 20 March 1994, Clare secured the title after an 0–11 to 0–9 win over Westmeath in the final round of the group stage.

Westmeath were relegated from Division 2.

Dublin's Aonghus O'Grady was the Division 2 top scorer with 2-38.

=== Table ===
Pos	Team	Pld	W	D	L	Diff	Pts	Notes
1	Clare	7	5	1	1	20	11	Division 2 champions, promoted to Division 1
2	Kilkenny	7	5	0	2	23	10	Promoted to Division 1
3	Laois	7	4	0	3	35	8	
4	Offaly	7	3	2	2	18	8	
5	Dublin	7	4	0	3	-4	8	
6	Kerry	7	3	0	4	-8	6	
7	Meath	7	1	1	5	-48	3	
8	Westmeath	7	0	1	6	-37	1	Relegated to Division 3

=== Group stage ===
17 October 1993	Kilkenny	1-12 - 0-11	Offaly	Nowlan Park, Kilkenny
	E Morrissey 1-2, DJ Carey 0-3, P Farrell 0-2, D Lalwor 0-2, P O'Neill 0-2, J Farrell 0-1.		John Troy 0-3, R Mannion 0-2, J Dooley 0-2, T Moylan 0-2, D Dooley 0-1, M Conneely 0-1.	Referee: T Murray (Limerick)

17 October 1993	Westmeath	0-6 - 0-13	Dublin	Castletown Geoghegan
	D Gillen 0-5, J Nugent 0-1.		A O'Grady 0-6, B McMahon 0-2, N Fleming 0-2, S Boland 0-1, C Maher 0-1, S Cooke 0-1.	Referee: D Murphy (Wexford)

17 October 1993	Kerry	0-12 - 2-4	Laois	Austin Stack Park, Tralee
	M Hennessy 0-6, B O'Sullivan 0-2, DJ Leahy 0-1, G O'Sullivan 0-1, T Maunsell 0-1, C Walsh 0-1.		M O'Hara 1-2, J Bates 1-1, D Rooney 0-1.	Referee: T Lyons (Limerick)

17 October 1993	Clare	1-14 - 1-8	Meath	Cusack Park, Ennis
	J McInerney 1-1, J O'Connor 0-4, F Tuohy 0-3, A Whelan 0-2, P O'Rourke 0-2, A Daly 0-1, B McNamara 0-1.		M Massey 1-0, P Potterton 0-4, D Martin 0-2, M Smith 0-1, D Murray 0-1.	Referee: M Darcy (Galway)

25 October 1993	Dublin	1-5 - 0-10	Kerry	Croke Park, Dublin
	C Barr 1-0, P Pringle 0-1, S Fleming 0-1, B McMahon 0-1, A O'Grady 0-1, S McDermott 0-1.		M Hennessy 0-5, C Walsh 0-2, T Maunsell 0-1, B O'Sullivan 0-1, G O'Sullivan 0-1.

31 October 1993	Offaly	2-10 - 1-13	Clare	St. Brendan's Park, Birr
	J Dooley 0-8, B Kelly 2-1, D Pilkington 0-1.		J o'Connor 0-5, PJ O'Connell 1-0, J McInerney 0-3, D Considine 0-3, A Whelan 0-2.	Referee: G Harrington (Cork)

31 October 1993	Meath	2-8 - 4-14	Kilkenny	St. Loman's Park, Trim
	P Potterton 1-3, M Cole 1-0, D Martin 0-3, T McKeown 0-1, M Smith 0-1.		E Morrissey 2-1, DJ Carey 0-5, J Brennan 1-1, A Ronan 1-1, D Lawlor 0-4, T Murphy 0-1, C Brennan 0-1.

31 October 1993	Laois	3-8 - 0-6	Westmeath	O'Moore Park, Portlaoise
	D Conroy 1-1, O Coss 1-1, J Fitzpatrick 1-0, J Dollard 0-3, P Hogan 0-1, N Delaney 0-1, M O'Hara 0-1.		D Kilcoyne 0-3, D Killen 0-3.

13 November 1993	Clare	2-9 - 1-8	Laois	Cusack Park, Ennis
	G O'Loughlin 2-0, J O'Connor 0-2, A Whelan 0-2, J McInerney 0-2, D Considine 0-1, PJ O'Connell 0-1, B McNamara 0-1.		O Coss 1-1, J Dollard 0-3, B Maher 0-2, A Bergin 0-1, D Conroy 0-1.

14 November 1993	Kilkenny	2-12 - 1-6	Dublin	Nowlan Park, Kilkenny
	E Morrissey 2-2, P Farrell 0-4, D Lawlor 0-2, L Keoghan 0-1, A Prendergast 0-1, J Power 0-1, DJ Carey 0-1.		B McMahon 1-1, M Fleming 0-1, R Boland 0-1, S McDermott 0-1, J Twomey 0-1, S Cooke 0-1.	Referee: J O'Donnell (Tipperary)

14 November 1993	Westmeath	1-4 - 1-13	Offaly	Castletown Geoghegan
	R Galvin 1-0, P Clancy 0-2, L Giles 0-1, G Jackson 0-1.		B Kelly 1-1, J Dooley 0-4, S Farrell 0-4, D Pilkington 0-2, T Moylan 0-1, K Flynn 0-1.

14 November 1993	Kerry	2-11 - 3-15	Meath	Austin Stack Park, Tralee
	J Healy 1-3, M Hennessy 0-6, DJ Leahy 1-2.		P Potterton 1-6, M Cole 1-2, R Kelly-Lynch 0-4, R Kelly 1-0, T Duignan 0-2, M Smith 0-1.

13 February 1994	Laois	0-12 - 2-3	Kilkenny	O'Moore Park, Portlaoise
	D Cuddy 0-5, B Maher 0-4, J Dollard 0-2, J Bates 0-1.		A Prendergast 1-1, E Morrissey 1-0, PJ Delaney 0-1, P O'Neill 0-1.	Referee: L O'FLynn (Cork)

13 February 1994	Dublin	2-11 - 1-12	Clare	Croke Park, Dublin
	A O'Grady 1-7, P Tobin 1-0, P Pringle 0-1, S Boland 0-1, J Murphy 0-1, B McMahon 0-1.		D Considine 1-1, J O'Connor 0-4, A Whelan 0-3, J McInerney 0-2, PJ O'Connell 0-1, F Tuohy 0-1.	Referee: P Neary (Kilkenny)

13 February 1994	Offaly	1-10 - 1-9	Kerry	St. Brendan's Park, Birr
	J Dooley 0-6, D Pilkington 1-0, P Temple 0-1, K Flynn 0-1, S Óg Farrell 0-1, Brendan Kelly 0-1.		T Maunsell 1-0, J Hennessy 0-3, J Healy 0-3, C Walsh 0-1, G O'Sullivan 0-1,	Referee: M Darcy (Galway)

13 February 1994	Meath	2-7 - 1-10	Westmeath	Athboy
	P Potterton 0-5, R O'Kelly-Lynch 1-0, D Martin 1-0, P Donnelly 0-1, P Cahill 0-1.		D Kilcoyne 1-10.	Referee: JA Cribben (Down)

27 February 1994	Laois	5-10 - 1-11	Dublin	O'Moore Park, Portlaoise
	P Bergin 3-1, D Cuddy 1-3, O Coss 1-0, D Rooney 0-3, G Norton 0-2, J Bates 0-1.		A O'Grady 1-9, C McCann 0-1, C Barr 0-1.

27 February 1994	Kerry	1-11 - 1-8	Westmeath	Austin Stack Park, Tralee
	J Hennessy 1-7, T Maunsell 0-2, G O'Sullivan 0-1, C Walsh 0-1.		F O'Farrell 1-1, D Kilcoyne 0-2, B Kennedy 0-1, S Kilcoyne 0-1, S McLoughlin 0-1.	Referee: J Harrington (Cork)

27 February 1994	Kilkenny	0-6 - 1-10	Clare	Nowlan Park, Kilkenny
	P Farrell 0-2, E Morrissey 0-2, L McCarthy 0-1, D O'Neill 0-1.		J O'Connor 0-5, J McInerney 1-0, D Considine 0-3, A Whelan 0-1, G O'Loughlin 0-1.	Referee: W Barrett (Tipperary)

6 March 1994	Clare	2-9 - 1-8	Kerry	Cusack Park, Ennis
	D Considine 0-4, J McInenrey 0-4, A Whelan 1-0, G O'Loughlin 1-0, J O'Connor 0-1.		J Hennessy 0-5, G O'Sullivan 1-0, M Casey 0-1, S Sheehan 0-1, T Maunsell 0-1.	Referee: T Murray (Limerick)

6 March 1994	Meath	0-7 - 4-11	Laois	Athboy
	P Potterton 0-6, P Donnelly 0-1.		D Cuddy 1-2, P Bergin 1-1, J Dollard 0-4, N Kirby 1-0, G Norton 0-3, J Bates 0-1.	Referee: P Neary (Kilkenny)

6 March 1994	Westmeath	0-12 - 1-14	Kilkenny	Collinstown
	D Kilcoyne 0-5, F Farrell 0-3, R Galvin 0-2, B Kennedy 0-1, S McLoughlin 0-1.		D Lawlor 1-3, DJ Carey 0-5, C Brennan 0-4, P Farrell 0-2.	Referee: M Kiely (Dublin)

6 March 1994	Dublin	0-17 - 1-12	Offaly	Croke Park, Dublin
	A O'Grady 0-7, J Twomey 0-3, C Barr 0-2, P Tobin 0-2, S McDermott 0-2, C McCann 0-1.		J Pilkington 1-2, J Dooley 0-4, John Troy 0-2, K Martin 0-1, P Temple 0-1, S Óg Farrell 0-1, D Pilkington 0-1.	Referee: S McDonnell (Tipperary)

13 March 1994	Offaly	2-15 - 0-7	Meath	St. Brendan's Park, Birr
	J Dooley 0-8, B Kelly 2-0, B Dooley 0-3, J Troy 0-2, M Duignan 0-1, D Pilkington 0-1.		P Potterton 0-3, D Martin 0-1, M Gannon 0-1, M Smith 0-1, M Cole 0-1.

20 March 1994	Kerry	0-11 - 2-8	Kilkenny	Austin Stack Park, Tralee
	M Hennessy 0-5, C Walsh 0-3, T Maunsell 0-2, J Walsh 0-1.		E Morrissey 1-1, J Brennan 1-0, DJ Carey 0-3, C Brennan 0-2, A Ronan 0-1, M Phelan 0-1.	Referee: J O'Leary (Cork)

20 March 1994	Offaly	1-14 - 2-11	Laois	St. Brendan's Park, Birr
	J Dooley 0-8, D Pilkington 1-1, John Troy 0-2, J Pilkington 0-2, M Duignan 0-1.		D Cuddy 1-5, P Bergin 1-0, B Maher 0-2, N Rigney 0-1, G Norton 0-1, O Coss 0-1, J Bates 0-1.	Referee: P O'Connor (Limerick)

20 March 1994	Meath	1-10 - 1-17	Dublin	Athboy
	P Potterton 0-5, P Donnelly 1-0, D Murray 0-2, J Gorry 0-1, M Smith 0-1.		A O'Grady 0-8, S DAlton 1-1, C Barr 0-3, C McCann 0-1, R Boland 0-1, S Boland 0-1, J Twomey 0-1, S McDermott 0-1.	Referee: T McIntyre (Antrim)

20 March 1994	Clare	0-11 - 0-9	Westmeath	Cusack Park, Ennis
	D Considine 0-4, A Whelan 0-2, J McInerney 0-2, P Markham 0-1, F Tuohy 0-1, J O'Connor 0-1.		D Kilcoyne 0-6, S Kilcoyne 0-1, P Clancy 0-1, F O'Farrell 0-1.

=== Scoring statistics ===
Top scorers overall

Rank	Player	Team	Tally	Total	Matches	Average
1	Aonghus O'Grady	Dublin	2-38	44	6	7.33
2	Johnny Dooley	Offaly	0-40	40	7	5.71
3	Pat Potterton	Meath	2-32	38	7	5.42
4	Eamon Morrissey	Kilkenny	7-08	29	7	4.14
4	David Kilcoyne	Westmeath	1-26	29	5	5.80

Top scorers in a single game

Rank	Player	Team	Tally	Total	Opposition
1	David Kilcoyne	Westmeath	1-10	13	Meath
2	Aonghus O'Grady	Dublin	1-09	12	Laois
3	Paul Bergin	Laois	3-01	10	Dublin
3	Joe Hennessy	Kerry	1-07	10	Westmeath
3	Aonghus O'Grady	Dublin	1-07	10	Clare
6	Pat Potterton	Meath	1-06	9	Kerry
7	Eamon Morrissey	Kilkenny	2-02	8	Dublin
7	David Cuddy	Laois	1-05	8	Offaly
7	Johnny Dooley	Offaly	0-08	8	Clare
7	Johnny Dooley	Offaly	0-08	8	Meath
7	Johnny Dooley	Offaly	0-08	8	Laois
7	Aonghus O'Grady	Dublin	0-08	8	Meath

== Division 3 ==
=== Table ===
Pos	Team	Pld	W	D	L	F	A	Diff	Pts	Notes
1	Carlow	7	7	0	0	20-90	10-46	74	14	Division 3 champions, promoted to Division 2
2	Roscommon	7	5	0	2	7-75	4-60	24	10	
3	Wicklow	7	3	2	2	9-89	11-56	27	8	
4	Derry	7	3	1	3	14-75	9-65	25	7	
5	Kildare	7	2	3	2	13-65	13-62	3	7	
6	Armagh	7	3	0	4	11-54	9-68	-8	6	
7	Monaghan	7	1	2	4	14-49	15-81	-35	4	
8	Mayo	7	0	0	7	5-44	22-93	-100	0	Relegated to Division 4

== Division 4 ==
=== Table ===
Pos	Team	Pld	W	D	L	F	A	Diff	Pts	Notes
1	Louth	7	6	0	1	25-100	9-37	111	12	Division 4 champions, promoted to Division 3
2	Fermanagh	7	4	2	1	14-69	7-48	42	10	
3	Longford	7	4	1	2	16-55	4-58	33	9	
4	Tyrone	7	4	1	2	15-71	10-61	25	9	
5	Donegal	7	3	0	4	10-55	16-67	-30	6	
6	Sligo	7	3	0	4	9-49	14-85	-51	6	
7	Leitrim	7	2	0	5	7-55	19-49	-30	4	
8	Cavan	7	0	0	7	5-35	23-97	-116	0	
