= Tommy Doyle (Westmeath hurler) =

Irish hurler (born 1993)

Personal information
- Native name: Tomás Ó Dúghaill (Irish)
- Nickname: Jogger
- Born: 16 January 1993 (age 33) Collinstown, County Westmeath, Ireland

Sport
- Sport: Hurling
- Position: Full-back
Club
- Years: Club
- Lough Lene Gaels
Club titles
- Westmeath titles: 0
Inter-county*
Years	County	Apps (scores)
2012–	Westmeath	21 (1–1)
Inter-county titles
- Leinster titles: 0
- All-Irelands: 0
- NHL: 0
- All Stars: 0
- *Inter County team apps and scores correct as of 17:48, 22 January 2018.

Thomas Doyle (born 16 January 1993) is an Irish hurler who plays as a full-back for the Westmeath senior team. He captained the team in 2018.

Doyle made his debut on the inter-county scene at the age of seventeen when he was selected for the Westmeath minor team. He played for two championship seasons with the minor team, before joining the Westmeath under-21 team. By this stage he had also joined the Westmeath senior team when he was added to the extended panel for the 2012 Walsh Cup. Since then he has become a regular member of the starting fifteen and has won one National League Division 2A medal.

== Honours ==
Westmeath

- All Ireland Minor B Hurling Championship (1): 2010
- National Hurling League Division 2A (2): 2016, 2019
- Kehoe Cup (1): 2019

Sporting positions
Preceded by Aonghus Clarke	Westmeath Senior Hurling Captain; 2018	Succeeded by Aonghus Clarke
