= 1991 All-Ireland Senior B Hurling Championship =

- Dates: 12 May – 7 July 1991
- Teams: 10
- Champions: Westmeath (3rd title); Pat O'Brien (captain); Joachim Kelly (manager)
- Runners-up: London

Tournament statistics
- Matches played: 10
- Goals scored: 40 (4 per match)
- Points scored: 215 (21.5 per match)
- Top scorer(s): David Kilcoyne (2-19)

The 1991 All-Ireland Senior B Hurling Championship was the 18th staging of the All-Ireland Senior B Hurling Championship since its establishment by the Gaelic Athletic Association in 1974. The championship ran from 12 May to 7 July 1991.

London entered the championship as the defending champions.

The All-Ireland final was played at Cusack Park in Mullingar on 7 July 1991 between Westmeath and London, in what was their third meeting in the All-Ireland final and a first meeting in seven years. Westmeath won the match by 2-12 to 2-06 to claim their third All-Ireland title overall.

Westmeath's David Kilcoyne was the championship's top scorer with 2-19.

== Results ==
=== All-Ireland preliminary round ===
12 May 1991 Preliminary round	Kildare	2-09 - 1-15	Wicklow	Geraldine Park
	J Byrne 1-1, E Kelly 1-1, M Moore 0-3, G Deering 0-1, C Flynn 0-1, R Byrne 0-1, J Kinlon 0-1.		C O'Brien 0-5, W Manley 1-1, S Kennedy 0-4, D Hyland 0-4, P Byrne 0-1.	Referee: J Guinan (Kilkenny)

=== All-Ireland quarter-finals ===
26 May 1991 Quarter-final	Westmeath	2-16 - 2-08	Roscommon	Cusack Park
	D Kilcoyne 1-7, S McLoughlin 1-1, P Clancy 0-3, E Gallagher 0-2, J Kennedy 0-1, R Galvin 0-1, D Gill 0-1.		S Kilroy 1-4, P Dolan 1-1, P Lyons 0-1, P Dooley 0-1, R Dooley 0-1.

26 May 1991 Quarter-final	Sligo	1-06 - 1-13	Mayo	Tourlestrane Grounds
	P Seevers 0-6, A Walsh 1-0.		F Delaney 1-1, P Delaney 0-4, M Trench 0-3, J Henry 0-2, K Doyle 0-2, D Twomey 0-1.

26 May 1991 Quarter-final	Carlow	4-15 - 1-09	Armagh	Dr. Cullen Park
	M Mullins 1-3, D Doyle 1-2, P English 1-2, M Farrell 0-4, J Murphy 1-0, J Nevin 0-2, B Hayden 0-1, J Kavanagh 0-1.		P Devlin 0-7, P Burke 1-0, P Doyle 0-1, C Casey 0-1.

26 May 1991 Quarter-final	Wicklow	1-11 - 1-11	Meath	Pearse Park
	P Byrne 1-2, W Carey 0-2, S Kennedy 0-2, N Cremin 0-2, D Hyland 0-1, D Lenihan 0-1, MA O'Neill 0-1.		J Andrews 1-1, P Potterton 0-3, D Martin 0-3, D Murray 0-2, S Ennis 0-1, J Smith 0-1.

3 June 1991 Quarter-final replay	Meath	2-07 - 2-10	Wicklow	St. Loman's Park
	J Andrews 1-0, M Gannon 1-0, J Smith 0-2, S Ennis 0-2, P Cahill 0-1, D Murray 0-1, D Martin 0-1.		N Cremin 0-4, W Marley 1-0, S Byrne 1-0, D Hyland 0-2, P Byrne 0-2, W Carey 0-1, D Curran 0-1.

=== All-Ireland semi-finals ===
9 June 1991 Semi-final	Carlow	4-15 - 3-06	Wicklow	O'Moore Park
	M Farrell 0-9, J Byrne 2-1, M Mullins 0-4, P English 1-0, B Hayden 1-0, P Murphy 0-1.		C O'Brien 1-0, D Lenihan 1-0, N Cremin 1-0, W Manley 0-2, W McDonald 0-1, D Hyland 0-1, S Byrne 0-1, W Carey 0-1.

9 June 1991 Semi-final	Westmeath	4-15 - 2-09	Mayo	Athleague Sportsfield
	D Kilcoyne 1-8, E Gallagher 1-1, J Donoghue 1-1, J Kennedy 1-1, A Devine 0-3, R Galvin 0-1.		J Henry 1-4, K Doyle 1-1, M Trench 0-3, Declan Greally 0-1.

=== All-Ireland home final ===
23 June 1991 Home final	Westmeath	3-10 - 0-12	Carlow	Croke Park
	D Kilcoyne 0-4, J Kennedy 1-0, D Gillen 1-0, P Clancy 1-0, A Devine 0-3, M Kennedy 0-2, R Galvin 0-1.		M Farrell 0-6, M Mullins 0-3, J Byrne 0-1, P Murphy 0-1, J Ryan 0-1.	Referee: M Quinn (Clare)

=== All-Ireland final ===
7 July 1991 Final	Westmeath	2-12 - 2-06	London	Cusack Park
	R Galvin 1-1, D Gillen 1-0, D Kilcoyne 0-3, P Clancy 0-3, J Kennedy 0-2, A Devine 0-1, S McLoughlin 0-1, E Gallagher 0-1.		J Murphy 1-1, M McGrath 1-0, D McKenna 0-2, N Daly 0-2, P Lynch 0-1.	Referee: JJ Corcoran (Galway)

== Championship statistics ==
=== Top scorers ===
Overall

Rank	Player	Team	Tally	Total	Matches	Average
1	David Kilcoyne	Westmeath	2-19	25	4	6.25
2	Martin Farrell	Carlow	0-19	19	3	6.33
3	Mark Mullins	Carlow	1-10	13	3	4.33
4	John Kennedy	Westmeath	2-04	10	4	2.50
5	Walter Manley	Wicklow	2-03	9	4	2.25
5	Joe Henry	Mayo	2-03	9	2	4.50
5	Pat Clancy	Westmeath	1-06	9	4	2.25
5	Ned Cremin	Wicklow	1-06	9	4	2.25
9	John Byrne	Carlow	2-02	8	3	2.66
9	Pat English	Carlow	2-02	8	3	2.66
9	Casey O'Brien	Wicklow	2-02	8	4	2.00
9	Paul Byrne	Wicklow	1-05	8	4	2.00
9	Don Hyland	Wicklow	0-08	8	4	2.00

In a single game

Rank	Player	Team	Tally	Total	Opposition
1	David Kilcoyne	Westmeath	1-08	11	Mayo
2	David Kilcoyne	Westmeath	1-07	10	Roscommon
3	Martin Farrell	Carlow	0-09	9	Wicklow
4	John Byrne	Carlow	2-01	7	Wicklow
4	Séamus Kilroy	Rosocmmon	1-04	7	Westmeath
4	Joe Henry	Mayo	1-04	7	Westmeath
4	Paul Devlin	Armagh	0-07	7	Carlow
8	Mark Mullins	Carlow	1-03	6	Armagh
8	Paul Seevers	Sligo	0-06	6	Mayo
8	Martin Farrell	Carlow	0-06	6	Westmeath
