= William O'Meara =

William O'Meara may refer to:

- William O'Meara (bishop), 18th-century Irish Catholic bishop
- William O'Meara (hurler) (born 1998), Irish hurler
