= David Kilcoyne =

David Kilcoyne may refer to:

- David Kilcoyne (hurler) (born 1962), former hurler from County Westmeath, Ireland
- Dave Kilcoyne (born 1988), Irish rugby union player
