= Shay Boland =

Hurler from Dublin, Ireland

Personal information
- Born: Dublin, Ireland

Sport
- Sport: Hurling
- Position: Left Corner Back
Inter-county
- Years: County
- 1990-1994: Dublin

Shay Boland is the current manager of the Dublin GAA under-21 hurling team. He is a former inter county hurling player with Dublin GAA.

Boland managed the Dublin minor hurling team to two successive Leinster titles and two successive all-Ireland minor hurling finals in 2011 and 2012. Shay played as a corner back for the Dublin senior hurling team in the Leinster final against Kilkenny in 1991.

Sporting positions
Preceded by Joe Fortune	Dublin Minor Hurling Manager; 2007-2012	Succeeded by Pádraig Fanning
Preceded by John Henderson	Dublin Under-21 Hurling Manager; 2012-2013	Succeeded by Joe Fortune
