= William O'Meara (hurler) =

Irish hurler

Personal information
- Native name: Liam Ó Meára (Irish)
- Born: 1998 (age 27–28) Askeaton, County Limerick, Ireland
- Occupation: Student
- Height: 5 ft 11 in (180 cm)

Sport
- Sport: Hurling
- Position: Full-back
Clubs
- Years: Club
- Askeaton; Ballysteen
College
- Years: College
- 2016-present: Limerick Institute of Technology
College titles
- Fitzgibbon titles: 0
Inter-county*
Years	County	Apps (scores)
2018-	Limerick	0 (0-00)
Inter-county titles
- Munster titles: 0
- All-Irelands: 1
- NHL: 1
- All Stars: 0
- *Inter County team apps and scores correct as of 17:06, 22 August 2018.

William O'Meara (born 1998) is an Irish hurler who plays as a full-back for club side Askeaton and at inter-county level with the Limerick senior hurling team.

== Playing career ==
=== University ===
As a student at the Limerick Institute of Technology, O'Meara was selected for the college's senior hurling team for the Fitzgibbon Cup.

=== Inter-county ===
==== Under-21 ====
O'Meara made his first appearance for the Limerick under-21 team on 7 May 2018 in a 3–18 to 0-13 Munster Championship defeat of Clare.

==== Senior ====
O'Meara joined the Limerick senior hurling panel in 2018 and made his first appearance for the team during the pre-season Munster League. On 19 August 2018, O'Meara was a member of the extended panel when Limerick won their first All-Ireland title in 45 years after a 3–16 to 2–18 defeat of Galway in the final.

On 3 March 2019, O'Meara made his first appearance for the Limerick senior team when he came on as a 7th-minute substitute for Seán Finn in a 1–14 to 2-11 National League draw with Clare. On 31 March 2019, he was named on the bench for Limerick's National League final meeting with Waterford at Croke Park. O'Meara collected a winners' medal as a non-playing substitute in the 1–24 to 0–19 victory.

== Career statistics ==
As of match played 31 March 2019.

Team	Year	National League			Munster		All-Ireland		Total	
Team	Year	Division	Apps	Score	Apps	Score	Apps	Score	Apps	Score
Limerick	2018	Division 1B	0	0-00	0	0-00	0	0-00	0	0-00
Limerick	2019	Division 1A	2	0-00	0	0-00	0	0-00	2	0-00
Total			2	0-00	0	0-00	0	0-00	2	0-00

== Honours ==
Limerick

- National Hurling League (1): 2019
