= Davy Glennon =

Irish hurler

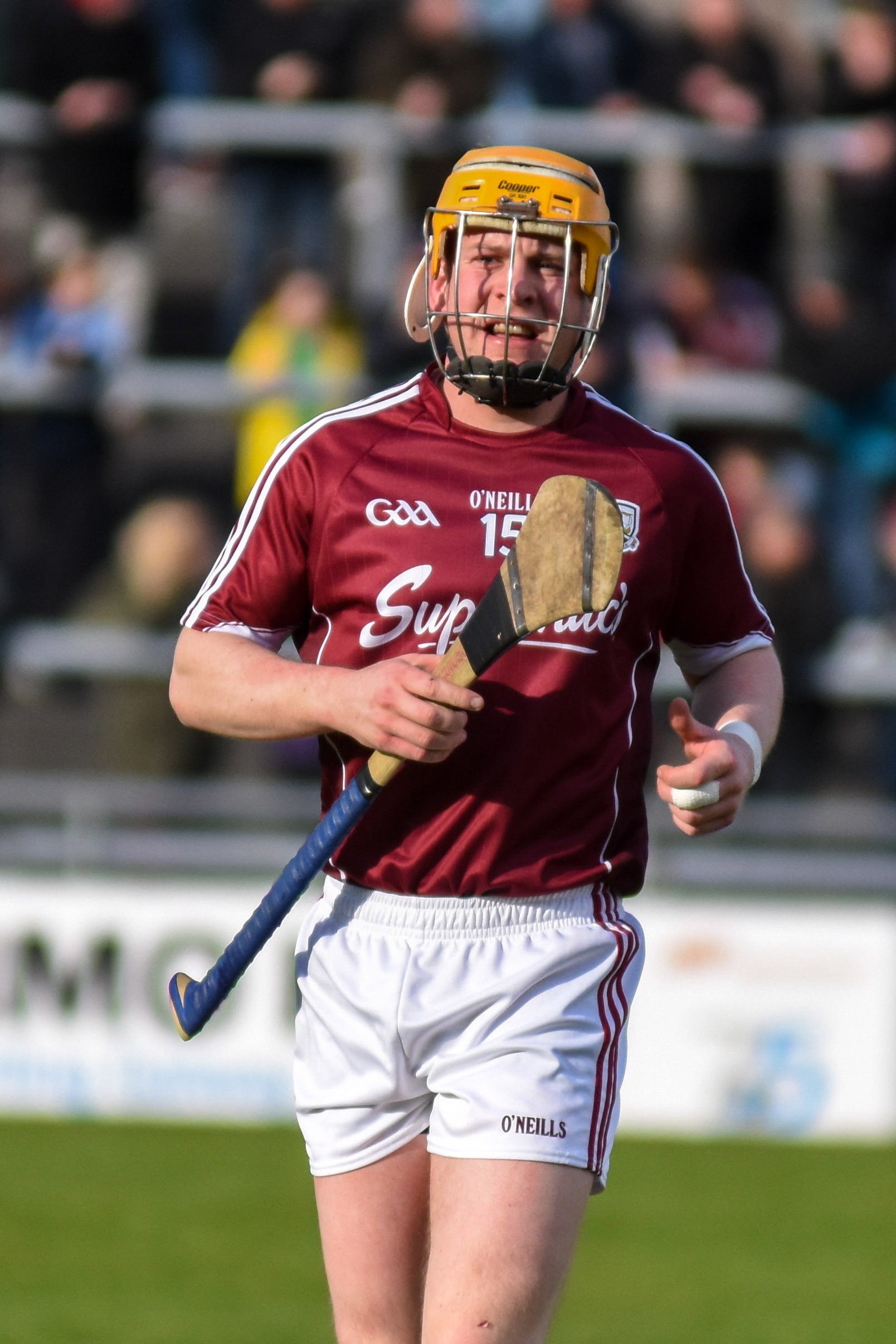
- Davy Glennon in 2016

Personal information
- Born: 5 February 1991 (age 35) Ballinasloe, Ireland

Sport
- Sport: Hurling
- Position: Midfield
Club
- Years: Club
- 2008–: Mullagh
Inter-county*
Years	County	Apps (scores)
2012–2019 20??–	Galway; Westmeath	24 (3–7)
Inter-county titles
- Leinster titles: 2
- All-Irelands: 1
- NHL: 1
- All Stars: 0
- *Inter County team apps and scores correct as of 22:17, 9 September 2012.

David 'Davy' Glennon (born 5 February 1991) is an Irish hurler who plays at inter-county level for Westmeath, having previously played for Galway. He continues to play with his club Mullagh.

Glennon came on as a substitute for Galway in the 2012 All-Ireland SHC final against Kilkenny. In 2016, he publicly admitted to having a serious gambling addiction, which had caused problems with the law, his family and hurling, and even to him contemplating ending his own life.

On 3 September 2017, Glennon was a non-playing substitute for Galway as they won their first All-Ireland SHC title for 29 years by defeating Waterford in the final.

On 17 July 2021, Glennon helped Westmeath win the Joe McDonagh Cup for the first time after a 2–28 to 1–24 win over Kerry at Croke Park.
