= Niall Mitchell =

Irish hurler (born 1997)

Personal information
- Native name: Niall Mistéil (Irish)
- Born: 10/02/1997 Clonkill, County Westmeath, Ireland
- Height: 6 ft 4 in (193 cm)

Sport
- Sport: Hurling
- Position: Centre-forward
Club
- Years: Club
- Clonkill
Club titles
- Westmeath titles: 2
Inter-county*
Years	County	Apps (scores)
2015–	Westmeath	16 (5–16)
Inter-county titles
- Leinster titles: 0
- All-Irelands: 0
- NHL: 1
- All Stars: 0
- *Inter County team apps and scores correct as of 20:37, 5 March 2018.

Niall Mitchell (born 1997) is an Irish hurler who plays as a centre-forward for the Westmeath senior team.

Born in Clonkill, County Westmeath, Mitchell first played competitive hurling at juvenile and underage levels with the Clonkill club. He subsequently played with the club's senior team, winning a county championship medal in 2015.

Mitchell made his debut on the inter-county scene at the age of sixteen when he was selected for the Westmeath minor team. He had two championship seasons with the minor team, before later joining the under-21 team. Mitchell made his debut with the Westmeath senior team during the 2016 championship.

== Career statistics ==
As of match played 25 February 2018.

Team	Year	National League			McDonagh Cup		Leinster		All-Ireland		Total	
Team	Year	Division	Apps	Score	Apps	Score	Apps	Score	Apps	Score	Apps	Score
Westmeath	2016	Division 2A	0	0-00	0	0-00	4	0-03	1	0-00	5	0-03
Westmeath	2017	Division 2A	5	1-02	0	0-00	3	1-04	1	0-00	9	2-06
Westmeath	2018	Division 2A	4	3-07	0	0-00	0	0-00	0	0-00	4	3-07
Total			9	4-09	0	0-00	7	1-07	2	0-00	18	5-16

== Honours ==
Clonkill

- Westmeath Senior Hurling Championship (1): 2015, 2018
- Westmeath Junior Hurling Championship (1): 2014

Westmeath

- Bord Gáis U21 Team of the Year 2016
