= 1987 All-Ireland Senior B Hurling Championship =

Tournament details
- Country: Ireland; England

Final positions
- Champions: London
- Runner-up: Carlow

The 1987 All-Ireland Senior B Hurling Championship was the 14th staging of Ireland's secondary hurling knock-out competition. London won the championship, beating Carlow 0–20 to 1–15 in the final at Dr. Cullen Park, Carlow.
