= Joe Fortune =

Irish hurler

Personal information
- Native name: Seosamh Ó Foirtcheirn (Irish)
- Born: 1979 (age 46–47) Enniscorthy, County Wexford, Ireland
- Occupation: Primary school teacher

Sport
- Sport: Hurling
Clubs
- Years: Club
- Rapparees; Enniscorthy Shamrocks; Naomh Mearnóg
Club titles
- Wexford titles: 0

Joe Fortune
Sport
Inter-county management
- Years: Team
- 2021–2024: Westmeath senior hurling team
Inter-county titles as manager
County	League	Province	All-Ireland
Dublin (minor) Dublin (U21)	0; 0	1; 1	1; 1

Joseph Fortune (born 1979) is an Irish former hurler. He managed the Westmeath senior hurling team between 2021 and 2024.

== Playing career ==
Fortune's club career began at juvenile and underage levels with the Rapparees club in Enniscorthy. He later transferred to rival club Shamrocks before spending over a decade lining out with the Naomh Mearnóg club in Dublin.

== Management career ==
Fortune's first move into team management and coaching came with a number of Dublin underage development squads in 2003 and 2004. He eventually became manager of the Dublin minor hurling team and guided them to Leinster Minor Championship success in 2007. Fortune subsequently took charge of the Dublin Institute of Technology team in the Fitzgibbon Cup before winning a Leinster Under-21 Championship title with the Dublin under-21 team in 2016. A spell with the Ballyboden St Enda's club team followed before a return to the inter-county scene with the Wexford under-20 hurling team. Fortune was appointed manager of the Westmeath senior hurling team in September 2021. He stepped down from his position as manager in June 2024 after three years in the role.

== Managerial honours ==
Ballyboden St Enda's

- Dublin Senior Hurling Championship: 2018

Dublin

- Leinster Under-21 Hurling Championship: 2016
- Leinster Minor Hurling Championship: 2007

Westmeath

- National Hurling League: 2022 National Hurling League Division 2

Sporting positions
Preceded by Shane O'Brien	Westmeath Senior Hurling Team Manager; 2021–2024	Succeeded by Seoirse Bulfin
