= 1984 All-Ireland Senior B Hurling Championship =

Tournament details
- Country: Ireland; England

Final positions
- Champions: Westmeath
- Runner-up: London

The 1984 All-Ireland Senior B Hurling Championship was the 11th staging of Ireland's secondary hurling knock-out competition. Westmeath won the centenary year championship, beating London 4–10 to 1–16 in the final at the Emerald GAA Grounds, Ruislip.
