= Brendan Keogh (hurler) =

Irish hurler

Personal information
- Native name: Breandán Mac Eochaidh (Irish)
- Born: 1970 (age 55–56) Athenry, County Galway, Ireland

Sport
- Sport: Hurling
- Position: Right wing-forward
Club
- Years: Club
- 1988-2003: Athenry
Club titles
- Galway titles: 7
- Connacht titles: 7
- All-Ireland Titles: 3
Inter-county
- Years: County
- 1991–1998: Galway
Inter-county titles
- Connacht titles: 3
- All-Irelands: 0
- NHL: 1
- All Stars: 0

Brendan Keogh (born 1970) is an Irish former hurler who played as a left wing-forward for the Galway senior team.

Keogh joined the team during the 1991 championship and was a regular member of the team for six seasons. An All-Ireland medalist in the under-21 grade, he won three Connacht winners' medals and one National Hurling League winners' medal at senior level. He ended up as an All-Ireland runner-up on one occasion.

At club level Keogh is an All-Ireland medalist with Athenry. In addition to this he has also won seven Connacht and county club championship winners' medals.
