= Mark Mullins (hurler) =

Irish hurler

Personal information
- Native name: Marc Ó Maoláin (Irish)
- Born: 1968 (age 57–58) Bagenalstown, County Carlow, Ireland
- Occupation: IT services manager

Sport
- Sport: Hurling
- Position: Midfield
Clubs
- Years: Club
- 1985-1988 1990-2002: Erin's Own; Na Piarsaigh
Club titles
- Cork titles: 2
Inter-county
Years	County	Apps (scores)
1986-1992 1993-1996 1997	Carlow; Cork; Carlow	4 (1-05)
Inter-county titles
- Munster titles: 0
- All-Irelands: 0
- NHL: 0
- All Stars: 0

Mark Mullins (born 1968) is an Irish former hurler, Gaelic footballer and coach. At club level he played with Erin's Own and Na Piarsaigh, and also lined out at inter-county level with Carlow and Cork.

== Playing career ==
Born in Bagenalstown, County Carlow, Mullins first played hurling at juvenile and underage levels with the Erin's Own club. A move to Cork for work reasons resulted in him transferring to the Na Piarsaigh club. Mullins was Na Piarsaigh's top scorer when the club won the Cork SHC title in 1990. He claimed a second winners' medal in 1995.

Mullins first appeared on the inter-county scene at minor level with Carlow. He won a Leinster "Special" MHC title in 1986, before later lining out at under-21 level as a dual player. Mullins continued his dual status to senior level and was part of the Carlow senior hurling team that won the All-Ireland SBHC title in 1992. He also earned selection to the Leinster Railway Cup team that year.

Mullins declared for the Cork senior hurling team in 1993 and spent four years with the team, including one season as captain in 1996. Mullins ended his inter-county career back with Carlow.

== Coaching career ==
Mullins was appointed Na Piarsaigh senior team manager in 2022, with Seán Óg Ó hAilpín and John Gardiner also serving as part of the management team.

== Honours ==
Na Piarsaigh

- Cork Senior Hurling Championship: 1990, 1995

Carlow

- All-Ireland Senior B Hurling Championship: 1992
- Leinster Special Minor Hurling Championship: 1986
- All-Ireland Under-16 B Football Championship: 1983

Sporting positions
Preceded by Pat Kenneally	Cork Senior Hurling Captain; 1996	Succeeded by Fergal McCormack
