= 2019 National Hurling League =

88th season of the National Hurling League

National Hurling League 2019
League details
- Dates: 26 January – 31 March 2019
- Teams: 35

League champions
- Winners: Limerick (12th win)
- Captain: Declan Hannon
- Manager: John Kiely

League runners-up
- Runners-up: Waterford
- Captain: Noel Connors
- Manager: Páraic Fanning

Other division winners
- Division 2A: Westmeath
- Division 2B: Wicklow
- Division 3A: Roscommon
- Division 3B: Longford

The 2019 National Hurling League is the 88th season of the National Hurling League for county teams.

Kilkenny were the defending champions, having won the 2018 league.

The GAA announced a new broadcast agreement on 10 January 2019 that runs from 2019 until 2022. Eir Sport and RTÉ provide live TV coverage of the league on Saturday nights. TG4 broadcast Sunday afternoon games. The highlights programmes are RTÉ2's League Sunday on Sunday evenings, TG4's GAA 2019 on Monday evenings and Eir Sport's Allianz Leagues Reloaded on Wednesday evenings.

Limerick won their first league title since 1997 after a 1-24 to 0-19 win against Waterford in the final on 31 March.

== Redistribution of the top 12 teams for 2020 ==
In November 2018, the GAA's Central Council decided to reorganise Divisions 1A and 1B before the start of the 2020 National Hurling League. As a result there was no relegation from 1A to 1B in 2019.

In 2019 the teams ranked 1 to 6 competed in Division 1A and the teams ranked 7 to 12 competed in Division 1B. Following the 2019 League the top twelve teams were redistributed into two groups of approximately equal strength. The two new groups were based on their finishing positions in 2019 and were expected to be redrawn after two years.

On completion of the five rounds on 10 March 2019 and a playoff on 16 March 2019, the two groups in 2020's Division 1 were determined as –

2020 Division 1 Group A
Limerick
Tipperary
Cork (winners of 5th v 6th Division 1A playoff in 2019)
Waterford
Galway
Westmeath

2020 Division 1 Group B
Wexford
Clare
Kilkenny (losers of 5th v 6th Division 1A playoff in 2019)
Dublin
Laois
Carlow

GAA President John Horan was of the opinion that the new Division 1 group structure would give managers "an opportunity to actually play players in a developmental manner" as team selections and tactics are likely to be more experimental if the teams do not have to avoid relegation.

== Competition format ==
League structure

Thirty-five teams compete in the 2019 NHL – six teams in the top five divisions (Divisions 1A, 1B, 2A, 2B, 3A) and five teams in Division 3B. All thirty-two county teams from Ireland take part. London, Lancashire and Warwickshire complete the lineup.

Teams by Province and Division
Province	Div 1A	Div 1B	Div 2A	Div 2B	Div 3A	Div 3B	Total
Connacht	0	1	1	0	1	2	5
Leinster	2	4	2	2	1	1	12
Munster	4	1	1	0	0	0	6
Ulster	0	0	1	3	3	2	9
Britain	0	0	1	1	1	0	3
Total	6	6	6	6	6	5	35

Each team plays all the other teams in their division once, either home or away. Two points are awarded for a win, and one for a draw.

The Division 1 hurling quarter-finals and semi-finals will finish on the day the games are played. If a quarter-final or semi-final is level after the initial seventy minutes, still level after two ten minute periods of extra time played each way, and still level after two further five minute periods of extra time, the outcome will be decided by a free-taking competition. This means the winner of quarter-finals and semi-finals will determined without requiring a replay and allow the league finals to be held on the scheduled date.

Tie-breaker

- If only two teams are level on league points, the team that won the head-to-head match is ranked ahead. If this game was a draw, score difference (total scored minus total conceded in all games) is used to rank the teams.
- If three or more teams are level on league points, score difference is used to rank the teams.

Finals, promotions and relegations

Division 1A

- The top four teams qualify for the Division 1 quarter-finals
- No relegation

Division 1B

- The top four teams qualify for the Division 1 quarter-finals
- The bottom two teams meet in a relegation play-off, with the losers being relegated to Division 2A

Division 2A

- The top two teams meet in Division 2A final, with the winners being promoted to Division 1
- The bottom team is relegated to Division 2B

Division 2B

- The top two teams meet in Division 2B final, with the winners being promoted to Division 2A
- The bottom two teams meet in a relegation play-off, with the losers being relegated to Division 3A

Division 3A

- The top two teams meet in Division 3A final, with the winners being promoted to Division 2B
- The bottom team is relegated to Division 3B

Division 3B

- The top two teams meet in Division 3B final, with the winners being promoted to Division 3A

== Division 1A ==
=== Division 1 Format ===
In 2019 the 12 teams in Division 1 were organised into two further divisions - teams ranked one to six in Division 1A and teams ranked seven to twelve in Division 1B. In 2020 the twelve top teams were redistributed into two divisions of approximately equal strength which were expected to be redrawn every two years.

Each team played all the other teams in their group once. Two points were awarded for a win and one for a draw. The top four teams in both 1A and 1B advanced to the league quarter-finals with the top team in 1A playing the fourth team in 1B, the second team in 1A playing the third in 1B, etc. Two semi-finals and a final followed.

=== Division 1A ===
For official fixtures and results see National Hurling League Division 1A at gaa.ie

==== Division 1A Table ====
NHL quarter-finals

Team	Pld	W	D	L	F	A	Diff	Pts
Limerick	5	3	1	1	6-91	7-72	+16	7
Wexford	5	3	0	2	6-85	5-82	+6	6
Clare	5	2	1	2	7-84	6-94	-7	5
Tipperary	5	2	0	3	5-90	4-81	+12	4
Kilkenny	5	2	0	3	4-85	5-91	-9	4
Cork	5	2	0	3	4-91	5-106	-18	4

- Tipperary, Kilkenny and Cork are ranked by score difference.

==== Division 1A Rounds 1 to 5 ====
===== Division 1A Round 1 =====
Saturday 26 January; 7pm	Tipperary	2-16 - 1-11	Clare	Semple Stadium; Attendance: 8,217; Referee: C Lyons (Cork)
Saturday 26 January; 7pm	S Callanan 2-7 (6 frees, 0-1 pen); N McGrath (0-3, 1 sideline); J Morris (0-2); A Flynn, M Breen, W Connors, R Byrne (0-1 each).	Report	N Deasy (1-1, 1-0 pen, 1 free); P Duggan (0-4, 3 frees, 1 '65); T Kelly (1 sideline), M O'Malley (1 free, 1 '65) (0-2 each); J Conlon, P Collins (0-1 each).	Semple Stadium; Attendance: 8,217; Referee: C Lyons (Cork)

Sunday 27 January; 2pm	Kilkenny	2-18 - 0-17	Cork	Nowlan Park; Attendance: 8,274; Referee: J Owens (Wexford)
Sunday 27 January; 2pm	K Kelly 0-8 (0-7f, 0-1 65), B Ryan 1-1, R Leahy 1-0, J Donnelly 0-3, C Delaney 0-2, G Aylward, C Fogarty, C Browne and P Deegan 0-1 each.	Report	P Horgan 0-10 (0-5f), C Murphy 0-4, D Kearney, A Walsh and D Dalton (0-1 sideline) 0-1 each.	Nowlan Park; Attendance: 8,274; Referee: J Owens (Wexford)

Sunday 27 January; 2pm	Wexford	2-11 - 1-17	Limerick	Wexford Park; Attendance: 7,000; Referee: F Horgan (Tipperary)
Sunday 27 January; 2pm	J O'Connor 1-5 (4f, 1’65’), C Dunbar 1-0, C McDonald 0-2, P Foley (f), L Og McGovern, H Kehoe, P Morris 0-1 each.	Report	A Gillane 1-5 (3f), D Byrnes (3f), P Casey 0-3 each, S Flanagan, C Ryan (l/b), D O'Donovan (l/b), G Hegarty, T Morrissey, B Murphy 0-1 each.	Wexford Park; Attendance: 7,000; Referee: F Horgan (Tipperary)

===== Division 1A Round 2 =====
Saturday 2 February; 7pm	Limerick	1-21 - 1-14	Tipperary	Gaelic Grounds; Attendance: 8,559; Referee: S Cleere (Kilkenny)
Saturday 2 February; 7pm	A Gillane 0-9 (5 f, 1 65), D Byrnes 0-4 (2 f, 1 65), G Mulcahy 1-1, T Morrissey 0-2, C Boylan 0-2, D O'Donovan 0-1, D Morrissey 0-1, P Casey 0-1	Report	S Callanan 0-5 (5 f), J Forde 0-3, Patrick Maher 1-0, M Breen 0-1, N McGrath 0-1, R Byrne 0-1, W Connors 0-1, B Heffernan 0-1, Padraic Maher 0-1	Gaelic Grounds; Attendance: 8,559; Referee: S Cleere (Kilkenny)

Sunday 3 February; 2pm	Clare	2-20 - 1-22	Kilkenny	Cusack Park; Referee: P O'Dwyer (Carlow)
Sunday 3 February; 2pm	P Duggan 0-6 (4f, 1’65), J Conlon 1-1, C Galvin 0-4, D Ryan 0-3, P Collins 1-0, S Golden 0-2, C Guilfoyle, G Cooney, I Galvin, N Deasy (f) 0-1 each.	Report	K Kelly 1-11 (1-11 frees), G Aylward 0-3, J Maher, B Ryan 0-2 each, C Delaney, C Fogarty, J Donnelly, P Walsh 0-1 each.	Cusack Park; Referee: P O'Dwyer (Carlow)

Sunday 3 February; 3pm	Cork	0-17 - 1-18	Wexford	Páirc Uí Chaoimh; Attendance: 6,897; Referee: J Murphy (Limerick)
Sunday 3 February; 3pm	P Horgan 0-5 (frees), A Walsh 0-4 each, B Cooper, T O’Mahony 0-2 each, C Murphy, D Kearney, S Kingston, C Lehane 0-1 each.	Report	J O’Connor 0-6 (0-5 frees), C Dunbar 0-3, D Dunne 1-0, P Foley (0-1 free), R O’Connor, D O’Keeffe 0-2 each, C McDonald (free), S Murphy, S Donohoe 0-1 each.	Páirc Uí Chaoimh; Attendance: 6,897; Referee: J Murphy (Limerick)

===== Division 1A Round 3 =====
Saturday 16 February; 7pm	Cork	1-20 - 0-20	Clare	Páirc Uí Rinn; Attendance: 4,737; Referee: J Ryan (Tipperary)
Saturday 16 February; 7pm	P Horgan 0-16 (15fs), S Harnedy 1-1, T O’Mahony, D Kearney, J Coughlan 0-1 each.	Report	T Kelly 0-6, I Galvin, J Conlon, P Duggan (3fs, 165) 0-4 each, D Ryan 0-2.	Páirc Uí Rinn; Attendance: 4,737; Referee: J Ryan (Tipperary)

Sunday 17 February; 2pm	Kilkenny	0-15 - 2-18	Limerick	Nowlan Park; Attendance: 11,238; Referee: F Horgan (Tipperary)
Sunday 17 February; 2pm	R Leahy 0-7 (0-4f), K Kelly (0-2f), B Ryan 0-2 each, L Blanchfield, G Malone, J Donnelly, J Maher 0-1 each.	Report	A Gillane 0-9 (0-6f), S Dowling 1-2, C Boylan 1-1, B Murphy 0-2, G Mulcahy, T Condon, D Byrnes (0-1f), R Hanley 0-1 each.	Nowlan Park; Attendance: 11,238; Referee: F Horgan (Tipperary)

Sunday 17 February; 2pm	Wexford	1-15 - 1-14	Tipperary	Wexford Park; Attendance: 6,700; Referee: C Lyons (Cork)
Sunday 17 February; 2pm	I Byrne (0-6, 0-6 frees); S Casey (1-1); D O’Keeffe (0-3); P Foley, K Foley, A Nolan, C Dunbar (l/b), R O’Connor (0-1 each).	Report	S Callanan (1-7, 0-6 frees); J Forde (0-1 free), N O’Meara (0-2); J Morris, R Maher, R Byrne (0-1 each).	Wexford Park; Attendance: 6,700; Referee: C Lyons (Cork)

===== Division 1A Round 4 =====
Sunday 24 February; 2pm	Clare	2-22 - 1-22	Wexford	Cusack Park; Attendance: 4,245; Referee: J Keenan (Wicklow)
Sunday 24 February; 2pm	P Duggan 1-6 (1-0 Pen, 6f); D Ryan 0-4; J Conlon 1-1; P Collins 0-3; D Fitzgerald, T Kelly, I Galvin 0-2 each; C Galvin, S Golden 0-1 each.	Report	R O’Connor 0-5 (1f); I Byrne 0-4 (4f); S Murphy 1-0; C Dunbar, L Óg McGovern, K Foley, J O’Connor (1f) 0-2 each; A Nolan, L Ryan, D O’Keeffe, L Chin, P Morris 0-1 each.	Cusack Park; Attendance: 4,245; Referee: J Keenan (Wicklow)

Sunday 24 February; 2pm	Tipperary	0-17 - 0-18	Kilkenny	Semple Stadium; Referee: J Murphy (Limerick)
Sunday 24 February; 2pm	S Callanan 0-5 (4f), J O’Dwyer 0-4, N McGrath 0-2, J Forde 0-2 (2f), N O’Meara 0-2, S Kennedy 0-1, R Byrne 0-1	Report	A Murphy 0-7 (7f), P Walsh 0-2, Walsh 0-2, E Murphy 0-2 (2f), B Ryan 0-1, M Keoghan 0-1, R Leahy 0-1, R Hogan 0-1, G Malone 0-1.	Semple Stadium; Referee: J Murphy (Limerick)

Sunday 24 February; 2:30pm	Limerick	1-21 - 2-21	Cork	Gaelic Grounds; Attendance: 13,407; Referee: P Murphy (Carlow)
Sunday 24 February; 2:30pm	S Dowling 0-6 (0-3f), P Casey 1-3, D Byrnes 0-6 (0-4f, 0-1 ’65), S Flanagan 0-2, G Hegarty, T Morrissey, C Lynch, G Mulcahy 0-1 each.	Report	P Horgan 1-9 (0-9f), C Lehane 1-1, D Dooley, S Harnedy, C Murphy, D Kearney 0-2 each, T O’Mahony (0-1f), B Cooper, A Walsh 0-1 each.	Gaelic Grounds; Attendance: 13,407; Referee: P Murphy (Carlow)

===== Division 1A Round 5 =====
Sunday 3 March; 2pm	Clare	2-11 - 1-14	Limerick	Cusack Park; Attendance: 8,409; Referee: P O'Dwyer (Carlow)
Sunday 3 March; 2pm	P Duggan (1-6, 0-6f), S Golden (1-1), D Ryan (0-2); T Kelly (0-1), G Cooney (0-1).	Report	A Gillane (0-8f), G Hegarty (1-0), P Casey (0-3), C Ryan (0-1 ‘65’); K Hayes (0-1), P O’Loughlin (0-1).	Cusack Park; Attendance: 8,409; Referee: P O'Dwyer (Carlow)

Sunday 10 March; 2pm	Cork	1-16 - 1-29	Tipperary	Páirc Uí Rinn; Attendance: 3,681; Referee: S Cleere (Kilkenny)
Sunday 10 March; 2pm	P Horgan 0-6 (5fs), C Lehane 0-4, A Walsh 1-0, B Cooper, A Cadogan, R O’Flynn, S Kingston, L Meade, M Coleman 0-1 each.	Report	J Forde 1-13 (8fs, 165), M Breen 0-6, S Callanan 0-3 (0-1 free), J Morris, N O’Meara 0-2 each, N McGrath, J McGrath, J O’Dwyer 0-1 each.	Páirc Uí Rinn; Attendance: 3,681; Referee: S Cleere (Kilkenny)

Sunday 10 March; 2pm	Wexford	1-19 - 1-12	Kilkenny	Innovate Wexford Park; Attendance: 6,000; Referee: A Kelly (Galway)
Sunday 10 March; 2pm	J O’Connor (0-6, 0-4f, 0-1 ‘65’), C Dunbar (1-0), L Chin (0-3), R O’Connor (0-3), P Morris (0-2f), L Og McGovern (0-1); S Murphy (0-1), K Foley (0-1); P Foley (0-1), D O’Keeffe (0-1).	Report	A Murphy (0-6, 0-4f); L Blanchfield (1-1), E Murphy (0-3f); P Walsh (0-1), W Walsh (0-1).	Innovate Wexford Park; Attendance: 6,000; Referee: A Kelly (Galway)

== Division 1B ==
=== Division 1B Table ===
NHL quarter-finals Relegated team

Team	Pld	W	D	L	F	A	Diff	Pts
Dublin	5	4	0	1	7-84	4-76	+17	8
Waterford	5	4	0	1	14-98	4-71	+57	8
Galway	5	3	1	1	5-100	4-78	+25	7
Laois	5	1	1	3	6-75	7-95	-23	3
Offaly	5	1	0	4	6-57	10-94	-49	2
Carlow	5	0	2	3	1-95	10-75	-27	2

- Offaly are ranked ahead of Carlow because they won the head-to-head game between the teams. Offaly were relegated as they were beaten in the relegation playoff by Carlow.

=== Division 1B Rounds 1 to 5 ===
For official fixtures and results see National Hurling League Division 1B at gaa.ie

==== Division 1B Round 1 ====
Saturday 26 January; 7pm	Dublin	3-15 - 0-18	Carlow	Parnell Park; Referee: A Kelly (Galway)
Saturday 26 January; 7pm	D Burke 1-4, E Dillon 1-1, J Hetherton 0-4 (0-3f), D O’Connell 1-0, F McGibb 0-2, O O’Rorke 0-1 (0-1f), F Whitely 0-1, T Connolly 0-1, P Smyth 0-1.	Report	M Kavanagh 0-12 (0-9f), T Joyce 0-2, C Nolan 0-2, J Doyle 0-1, S Murphy 0-1.	Parnell Park; Referee: A Kelly (Galway)

Sunday 27 January; 12:30pm	Galway	1-27 - 2-15	Laois	Pearse Stadium; Referee: J Murphy (Limerick)
Sunday 27 January; 12:30pm	J Canning (0-10, 0-08 frees, 0-1 '65); D Glennon (1-2); C Mannion (0-4); S Loftus, S Blehane, T Monaghan (0-2); J Coyne, B Concannon, P Mannion, A Harte (0-1); T Haran (0-1, free)	Report	PJ Scully (0-6 frees); J Lennon (2-0); M Kavanagh (0-4 frees); J Kelly (0-2); P Purcell, A Dunphy (0-1)	Pearse Stadium; Referee: J Murphy (Limerick)

Sunday 27 January; 2pm	Waterford	2-28 - 0-7	Offaly	Semple Stadium; Referee: P Murphy (Carlow)
Sunday 27 January; 2pm	Stephen Bennett (0-16, 0-10 frees); DJ Foran (1-3); M Kearney (0-3); J Prendergast (1-0); T Ryan (0-2); T de Burca, K Moran, M O'Brien, Shane Bennett (0-1)	Report	E Cahill (0-2 frees); A Treacy (0-2, 0-1 free, 0-1 '65); K Connolly (0-2); D Egan (0-1)	Semple Stadium; Referee: P Murphy (Carlow)

==== Division 1B Round 2 ====
Sunday 3 February; 14:00	Laois	1-15 - 4-22	Waterford	O'Moore Park; Referee: C Cunning (Antrim)
Sunday 3 February; 14:00	M Kavanagh 1-8 (0-8 frees), J Kelly 0-2, PJ Scully (free), R Mullaney, S Downey, N Foyle, W Dunphy 0-1 each.	Report	Stephen Bennett 0-12 (0-8 frees, 0-1 65), P Curran 2-2, T Ryan 2-1, M Kearney 0-3, DJ Foran, C Dunford, M O'Brien, M Shanahan 0-1 each.	O'Moore Park; Referee: C Cunning (Antrim)

Sunday 3 February; 14:00	Offaly	0-12 - 2-19	Dublin	O'Connor Park; Referee: J Keenan (Wicklow)
Sunday 3 February; 14:00	K Connolly (3f), E Cahill (3f) 0-3 each, P Murphy 0-2, O Kelly, C Gath, D Egan, K Dunne 0-1 each.	Report	O O’Rorke 2-3, D Burke 0-6, J Hetherton 0-3 (2f), D Treacy (1f), F Whitely 0-2 each, L Rushe, S Moran, D Sutcliffe 0-1 each.	O'Connor Park; Referee: J Keenan (Wicklow)

Sunday 3 February; 14:00	Carlow	0-20 - 0-20	Galway	Netwatch Cullen Park; Referee: C McAllister (Cork)
Sunday 3 February; 14:00	M Kavanagh (0-11, 0-10f), C Nolan (0-02), S Murphy (0-02); T Joyce (0-01), E Byrne (0-01), J Doyle (0-01), D English (0-01, 0-01f), S Whelan (0-01).	Report	J Canning (0-10, 0-08f), T Monaghan (0-02), J Coen (0-02), S Kilduff (0-02); S Loftus (0-01); A Harte (0-01); B Concannon (0-01), C Mannion (0-01).	Netwatch Cullen Park; Referee: C McAllister (Cork)

==== Division 1B Round 3 ====
Saturday 16 February; 19:00	Waterford	3-15 - 0-10	Carlow	Fraher Field; Attendance: 2,400; Referee: J Keenan (Wicklow)
Saturday 16 February; 19:00	Stephen Bennett 1-8 (8fs), T Ryan 1-1, Shane Bennett 1-0, J Barron 0-2, C Dunford, DJ Foran, M Kearney, C Lyons 0-1 each.	Report	M Kavanagh 0-4 (3fs), D Murphy (1f), E Byrne 0-2 each, R Coady, C Nolan 0-1 each.	Fraher Field; Attendance: 2,400; Referee: J Keenan (Wicklow)

Saturday 16 February; 19:00	Laois	3-17 - 2-16	Offaly	O'Moore Park; Referee: A Kelly (Galway)
Saturday 16 February; 19:00	M Kavanagh 0-10 (0-8 frees, 0-1 sideline), W Dunphy 2-1, S Maher 1-1, A Dunphy 0-3, E Lyons & J Lennon 0-1 each.	Report	J Bergin 1-9 (1-8 frees), C Gath 1-0, M Egan & S Dooley (0-1f) 0-2 each, P Murphy, K Connolly, E Cahill (0-1f) & P Camon 0-1 each.	O'Moore Park; Referee: A Kelly (Galway)

Sunday 17 February; 14:00	Galway	0-20 - 1-11	Dublin	Pearse Stadium; Attendance: 6,983; Referee: J Owens (Wexford)
Sunday 17 February; 14:00	J Canning 0-8 (0-8f), C Mannion 0-4, S Bleahene 0-2, J Flynn 0-1, C Whelan 0-1, A Harte 0-1, N Burke 0-1, S Loftus 0-1, D Glennon 0-1.	Report	D Sutcliffe 1-0, R McBride 0-3 (0-1sl), D Treacy 0-3 (0-1 65, 0-2f), E Dillon 0-2, J Hetherton 0-1 (0-1f), D Burke 0-1, S Moran 0-1 (0-1f).	Pearse Stadium; Attendance: 6,983; Referee: J Owens (Wexford)

==== Division 1B Round 4 ====
Sunday 24 February; 14:00	Offaly	0-14 - 2-20	Galway	O'Connor Park; Referee: S Stack (Dublin)
Sunday 24 February; 14:00	J Bergin 0-6 (0-5f, 0-1 ’65), C Egan 0-3, K Connolly, K Dunne, S Dolan, C Gath (sideline), P Murphy 0-1 each.	Report	J Flynn 0-13 (0-8f, 0-4 ‘65s), C Whelan 1-2 (0-1f), B Concannon 1-1, N Burke, D Glennon, S Kilduff, S Loftus 0-1 each.	O'Connor Park; Referee: S Stack (Dublin)

Sunday 24 February; 14:00	Dublin	1-26 - 4-15	Waterford	Parnell Park; Referee: F Horgan (Tipperary)
Sunday 24 February; 14:00	O O'Rorke 0-11 (0-8f, 0-1 65), L Rushe 1-1, E Dillon 0-4, D Sutcliffe 0-4, C Crummey 0-2, J Hetherton 0-2, S Barrett 0-1, F Whitely 0-1.	Report	Stephen Bennett 2-7 (1-7f), Shane Bennett 1-2, T Ryan 1-1, J Barron 0-2, K Moran 0-2, J Prendergast 0-1.	Parnell Park; Referee: F Horgan (Tipperary)

Sunday 24 February; 14:00	Carlow	0-17 - 0-17	Laois	Netwatch Cullen Park; Referee: C McAllister (Cork)
Sunday 24 February; 14:00	M Kavanagh 0-8 (0-7 frees, 0-1 65), C Nolan, S Murphy 0-2 each, J Kavanagh, D English (free) JM Nolan, E Byrne, J Nolan 0-1 each.	Report	M Kavanagh 0-8 (0-5 frees, 0-2 65s), E Rowland 0-4 (frees), A Dunphy 0-2, J Kelly, C Dwyer, N Foyle 0-1 each.	Netwatch Cullen Park; Referee: C McAllister (Cork)

==== Division 1B Round 5 ====
Sunday 3 March; 14:00	Carlow	1-10 - 4-08	Offaly	Dr. Cullen Park; Referee: J Ryan (Tipperary)
Sunday 3 March; 14:00	M Kavanagh 0-6 (5fs, 1 "pen"), S Murphy 1-0, D Murphy 0-1, J Kavanagh 0-1, C Nolan 0-1 (f), D English 0-1 (f).	Report	J Bergin 2-3 (3fs), S Dooley 2-1, C Langton 0-2, C Gath 0-1, J Gorman 0-1.	Dr. Cullen Park; Referee: J Ryan (Tipperary)

Sunday 3 March; 14:00	Dublin	0-13 - 0-11	Laois	Parnell Park; Referee: L Gordon (Galway)
Sunday 3 March; 14:00	D Sutcliffe, D Treacy (3f) 0-3 each, O O'Rorke, S Moran (1f, 1 '65) 0-2 each, S Barrett, J Hetherton, C Boland 0-1 each.	Report	M Kavanagh 0-4 (3f), C Dwyer 0-2, E Rowland (f), S Downey, A Dunphy, P Purcell, W Dunphy 0-1 each.	Parnell Park; Referee: L Gordon (Galway)

Sunday 10 March; 2pm	Waterford	1-18 - 2-13	Galway	Walsh Park; Attendance: 3,371; Referee: D Hughes (Carlow)
Sunday 10 March; 2pm	Stephen Bennett 0-10 (9fs), Shane Bennett 1-1, J Barron 0-3, Pauric Mahony, M Kearney 0-2 each.	Report	J Canning 0-7, J Flynn 1-1 (0-1f), N Burke 0-3, B Concannon 1-0, C Whelan 0-2.	Walsh Park; Attendance: 3,371; Referee: D Hughes (Carlow)

== Division 1 Knockout ==
For official fixtures and results see National Hurling League Division 1 at gaa.ie

=== Division 1 Quarter-Finals ===
The hurling quarter-finals finish on the day the games are played, avoiding the need for replays. If the score is level after the initial seventy minutes, still level after two ten minute periods of extra time played each way, and still level after a further two five minute periods of extra time, a free-taking competition is held. Each team nominates five players to take frees from their chosen position on a sixty five metre line selected by the referee and without defenders. The nominated players from each team take alternate turns. If the teams score an equal number of the five frees, the outcome of the match is decided by sudden death frees using the same nominated players in the same order.

The fixtures are 1st in Division 1A plays 4th in Division 1B, 2nd in Division 1A plays 3rd in Division 1B, etc. Home advantage is decided by whichever team has played fewer home games in their five league games, with a coin toss taking place if the number of home games played is the same for both teams.

9 March 2019; 19:00	Laois	0-11 - 2-22	Limerick	O'Moore Park; Attendance: 5,000; Referee: C Lyons (Cork)
9 March 2019; 19:00	M Kavanagh 0-6 (5f), L Cleere 0-1, E Rowland 0-1 (1f), J Kelly 0-1, P Purcell 0-1, A Dunphy 0-1	Report	B Murphy 0-8 (7f), S Flanagan 1-2, C Boylan 1-1, G Hegarty 0-3, P Casey 0-3, D Dempsey 0-1, D Hannon 0-1, R Hanley 0-1, D Byrnes 0-1 (1f), D O'Donovan 0-1(1l/b)	O'Moore Park; Attendance: 5,000; Referee: C Lyons (Cork)

16 March 2019; 13:30	Galway	3-21 - 3-11	Wexford	Pearse Stadium; Referee: C McAllister (Cork)
16 March 2019; 13:30	J Canning 0-15 (0-13 fs, 0-1 65); C Mannion 1-2, N Burke 1-1, T Haran 1-0, B Concannon 0-2, C Whelan 0-1.	Report	C McDonald 2-2 (0-1 f); L Chin 1-2; P Morris 0-5 (0-3 fs, 0-1 65), D O'Keeffe, M O'Hanlon, A Nolan 0-1.	Pearse Stadium; Referee: C McAllister (Cork)

16 March 2019; 15:00	Waterford	0-31 - 1-14	Clare	Walsh Park; Attendance: 2,753; Referee: S Cleere (Kilkenny)
16 March 2019; 15:00	Stephen Bennett 0-16 (14f); P Mahony, A Gleeson 0-5 each; P Hogan 0-2; C Roche, Shane Bennett (sideline), S McNulty 0-1 each	Report	P Duggan 1-7 (1-0 Pen, 6f, 1/sl); T Kelly 0-3; C Malone 0-2; A Shanagher, A McCarthy 0-1 each.	Walsh Park; Attendance: 2,753; Referee: S Cleere (Kilkenny)

16 March 2019; 16:30	Tipperary	0-23 - 1-21	Dublin	Semple Stadium; Referee: P Murphy (Carlow)
16 March 2019; 16:30	J Forde 0-7 (6f), N McGrath 0-4 (1f), J Morris 0-3, M Kehoe, Callanan 0-2 each, R Maher, M Breen, N O'Meara, J McGrath, B Maher (f) 0-1 each.	Report	E Dillon 1-3, S Moran 0-5 (3f, 1 '65), O O'Rorke 0- 5 (4f), C Boland, P Ryan 0-2 each, E O'Donnell, C Crummey, J Malone 0-1 each.	Semple Stadium; Referee: P Murphy (Carlow)

=== Division 1 Semi-Finals ===
The hurling semi-finals finish on the day the games are played, avoiding the need for replays. If the score is level after the initial seventy minutes, still level after two ten minute periods of extra time played each way, and still level after a further two five minute periods of extra time, a free-taking competition is held. Each team nominates five players to take frees from their chosen position on a sixty five metre line selected by the referee and without defenders. The nominated players from each team take alternate turns. If the teams score an equal number of the five frees, the outcome of the match is decided by sudden death frees using the same nominated players in the same order.

24 March 2019; Semi-final	Limerick	1-19 - 1-16	Dublin	Nowlan Park; Referee: J Keenan (Wicklow)
24 March 2019; Semi-final	A Gillane (3f), D Byrnes (4f) 0-5 each, G Mulcahy 0-3, S Flanagan 1-0, D O’Donovan 0-2, T Morrissey, G Hegarty, P Casey, C Lynch 0-1 each.	Report	P Ryan 0-6f, D Sutcliffe, E Dillon 0-3 each, R Hayes 1-0, T Connolly, D Treacy, S Moran (f), C Crummey 0-1 each.	Nowlan Park; Referee: J Keenan (Wicklow)

24 March 2019; Semi-final	Galway	0-19 - 1-18	Waterford	Nowlan Park; Referee: P O'Dwyer (Carlow)
24 March 2019; Semi-final	J Canning 0-7 (5f), C Mannion 0-4, D Glennon 0-3, K Hussey, J Coen, C Whelan, B Concannon, J Flynn (f) 0-1 each.	Report	Stephen Bennett 1-7 (1-6 frees), Pauric Mahony 0-3, J Barron 0-2, M Kearney, J Prendergast, A Gleeson, T Ryan, P Hogan, C Lyons 0-1 each.	Nowlan Park; Referee: P O'Dwyer (Carlow)

=== Division 1 Final ===
The final was postponed from 24 March to 31 March 2019 as three of the round five fixtures were called off due to bad weather on the weekend of 2–3 March.

31 March 2019; 14:00; Final	Limerick	1-24 - 0-19	Waterford	Croke Park; Attendance: 44,257; Referee: J Owens (Wexford)
31 March 2019; 14:00; Final	A Gillane 1-9 (0-4f), G Hegarty, P Casey 0-3 each, C Lynch, S Dowling (0-1f) 0-2 each, D Hannon, T Morrissey, D O’Donovan (0-1 sideline), G Mulcahy, S Flanagan 0-1 each.	Report	Stephen Bennett 0-9 (0-6f), Pauric Mahony 0-5 (0-4f), A Gleeson 0-2 (0-1 sideline), Philip Mahony, K Moran, J Prendergast 0-1 each.	Croke Park; Attendance: 44,257; Referee: J Owens (Wexford)

=== Division 1A play-off ===
This playoff between the teams ranked 5th and 6th in 2019's Division 1A was used to determine which of the two groups the teams were allocated to in 2020's restructured Division 1. Brian Cody, the Kilkenny manager, described it as "a futile match really".

16 March 2019	Kilkenny	1-16 - 2-15	Cork	Nowlan Park; Referee: J Owens (Wexford)
16 March 2019	A Murphy 1-4 (goal pen, 2f, 165), R Hogan 0-5 (3f); N Brassil 0-3; R Leahy 0-2; J Maher, B Ryan 0-1 each.	Report	C Lehane 0-8 (6f, 165); J O'Connor, J Coughlan 1-0 each; S Kingston 0-3; L Meade 0-2; M Coleman, C Murphy 0-1 each.	Nowlan Park; Referee: J Owens (Wexford)

=== Division 1B relegation play-off ===
10 March 2019	Offaly	1-16 - 2-14	Carlow	O'Connor Park; Referee: J Keenan (Wicklow)
10 March 2019	J Bergin 1-7 (4f, 1 ‘65’), S Dooley 0-3, S Kinsella, K Connolly 0-2 each, K Dunne, E Cahill (f) 0-1 each.	Report	M Kavanagh 0-8 (4f), C Nolan 1-4, S Murphy 1-1, JM Nolan 0-1.	O'Connor Park; Referee: J Keenan (Wicklow)

=== Division 1 scoring statistics ===
Top scorers overall

Rank	Player	Team	Tally	Total	Matches	Average
1	Stephen Bennett	Waterford	4-85	97	8	12.12
2	Joe Canning	Galway	0-57	57	6	9.50
3	Aaron Gillane	Limerick	2-45	51	6	8.50
4	Patrick Horgan	Cork	1-46	49	5	9.80
4	Martin Kavanagh	Carlow	0-49	49	6	8.16
5	Mark Kavanagh	Laois	1-44	47	6	7.8
6	Peter Duggan	Clare	3-33	42	6	7.00
7	Séamus Callanan	Tipperary	3-29	38	6	6.33
8	Joe Bergin	Offaly	4-25	37	4	9.25
9	Jason Forde	Tipperary	1-26	29	5	5.80

Top scorers in a single game

Rank	Player	Club	Tally	Total	Opposition
1	Jason Forde	Tipperary	1-13	16	Cork
1	Stephen Bennett	Waterford	0-16	16	Waterford
1	Patrick Horgan	Cork	0-16	16	Clare
1	Stephen Bennett	Waterford	0-16	16	Offaly
2	Joe Canning	Galway	0-15	15	Wexford
3	Kevin Kelly	Kilkenny	1-11	14	Clare
4	Séamus Callanan	Tipperary	2-07	13	Clare
4	Stephen Bennett	Waterford	2-07	13	Dublin
4	Jason Flynn	Galway	0-13	13	Offaly
5	Aaron Gillane	Limerick	1-09	12	Waterford
5	Patrick Horgan	Cork	1-09	12	Limerick
5	Joe Bergin	Offaly	1-09	12	Laois
5	Martin Kavanagh	Carlow	0-12	12	Dublin
5	Stephen Bennett	Waterford	0-12	12	Laois

== Division 2A ==
=== Division 2A Table ===
Division champions, promoted Relegated team

Team	Pld	W	D	L	F	A	Diff	Pts
Westmeath	5	5	0	0	10-79	3-73	+27	10
Kerry	5	4	0	1	12-98	7-57	+56	8
Antrim	5	3	0	2	12-78	4-83	+19	6
Meath	5	1	1	3	6-76	10-75	-14	3
Mayo	5	1	1	3	0-45	11-65	-50	3
London	5	0	0	5	4-53	9-76	-38	0

=== Division 2A Rounds 1 to 5 ===
For official fixtures and results see National Hurling League Division 2A at gaa.ie

==== Division 2A Round 1 ====
26 January 2019	Antrim	2-16 - 1-21	Kerry	Corrigan Park; Referee: S Stack (Dublin)
26 January 2019	J McNaughton 0-12 (8 f’s, 1 ’65); E O’Neill 2-00; J O’Connell 0-2; C McHugh 0-1; K Molloy 0-1.	Report	S Conway 0-13 (10 f’s); J Conway 0-5; J Goulding 1-1; P Boyle 0-3.	Corrigan Park; Referee: S Stack (Dublin)

27 January 2019	Westmeath	2-17 - 0-15	London	TEG Cusack Park; Referee: P O'Dwyer
27 January 2019	N Mitchell (1-6); A Devine (1-2), D Clinton (0-2), J Galvin (0-2), R Greville (0-2), J Boyle (0-1), K Doyle (0-1), D McNicholas (0-1).		A Sheehan (0-7), J Kennedy (0-2), C Thornton (0-1); D Nolan (0-1), S Lohan (0-1), S Lawless (0-1), M O'Dwyer (0-1); B Hickey (0-1).	TEG Cusack Park; Referee: P O'Dwyer

27 January 2019	Mayo	0-17 - 0-17	Meath	Adrian Freeman Memorial Park; Referee: L Gordon
27 January 2019	S Boland (0-10), C Freeman (0-2); S Regan (0-2), S Kenny (0-2), E Delaney (0-1).		P O'Hanrahan (0-7), D Kelly (0-2); A Douglas (0-2), K Keena (0-2), S Quigley (0-1); D Healy (0-1), J Keena (0-1), E O Donnchadha (0-1).	Adrian Freeman Memorial Park; Referee: L Gordon

==== Division 2A Round 2 ====
3 February 2019	Kerry	2-17 - 4-13	Westmeath	Austin Stack Park; Referee: R McGann
3 February 2019	S Conway (1-10), M Boyle (1-0), P Boyle (0-3); J Goulding (0-2), M O'Leary (0-1), D Griffin (0-1).		N Mitchell (0-5); R Greville (1-1), C Boyle (1-1), S Clavin (1-0); D McNicholas (1-0), A Devine (0-2), K Doyle (0-2), D Clinton (0-1), P Greville (0-1).	Austin Stack Park; Referee: R McGann

3 February 2019	Meath	2-15 - 3-13	Antrim	St. Loman's Park, Trim; Referee: S Ryan
3 February 2019	J Regan (1-4), P O'Hanrahan (0-6), D Healy (1-0), D Kelly (0-3); M O'Grady (0-1), K Keena (0-1).		J McNaughton (1-8); E O'Neill (1-2), C Clarke (1-1), N Elliott (0-1), M Donnelly (0-1).	St. Loman's Park, Trim; Referee: S Ryan

10 March 2019	London	Cancelled	Mayo	McGovern Park

==== Division 2A Round 3 ====
17 February 2019	Kerry	3-18 - 0-09	Mayo	Austin Stack Park, Tralee; Referee: T Walsh (Waterford)
17 February 2019	P Boyle 0-9 (6fs); D O'Carroll 1-2; M Slattery 0-4; D Collins and J Goulding 1-0 each; B Barrett, J Conway and M Boyle 0-1 each.	Report	S Boland 0-6 (4fs); C Freeman 0-2 (1 '65); S Regan 0-1.	Austin Stack Park, Tralee; Referee: T Walsh (Waterford)

17 February 2019	Meath	3-16 - 3-10	London	St. Loman's Park, Trim; Referee: D Hughes
17 February 2019	F Ferguson (2-1), P O'Hanrahan (0-6); E O Donnacha (1-1), J Regan (0-4), A Douglas (0-3), J Kelly (0-1).		M O'Dwyer (2-0), C Nelson (1-1), A Sheehan (0-4), C Allis (0-2), S Lohan (0-1); D Glynn (0-1), S Lawless (0-1).	St. Loman's Park, Trim; Referee: D Hughes

17 February 2019	Antrim	1-15 - 1-17	Westmeath	TEG Cusack Park
17 February 2019	J McNaughton (0-11), K Molloy (1-0), N Elliott (0-1), K Rice (0-1); C McCann (0-1), N McManus (0-1).		A Devine (1-5), D McNicholas (0-5), K Doyle (0-2), S Clavin (0-2); A Clarke (0-1), P Greville (0-1); N Mitchell (0-1).	TEG Cusack Park

==== Division 2A Round 4 ====
23 February 2019	London	1-11 - 3-27	Kerry	McGovern Park; Referee: R McGann
23 February 2019	C Allis (1-2), A Sheehan (0-3), C Nelson (0-2), T Healy (0-2), S Lawless (0-1), M O'Dwyer (0-1).		P Boyle (1-7), J Goulding (1-6), D Goggin (1-1), D Griffin (0-4), M O'Leary (0-4); J Conway (0-2), B Barrett (0-2); D Collins (0-1).	McGovern Park; Referee: R McGann

24 February 2019	Westmeath	1-20 - 0-20	Meath	TEG Cusack Park; Referee: C Canning
24 February 2019	R Greville (1-5), D McNicholas (0-5), N Mitchell (0-4), J Boyle (0-3); C Doyle (0-2), S Clavin (0-1).		J Regan (0-8), P O'Hanrahan (0-3); D Healy (0-3), J Toher (0-2), K Keoghan (0-1), J Kelly (0-1); D Kelly (0-1); M O'Grady (0-1).	TEG Cusack Park; Referee: C Canning

24 February 2019	Mayo	0-13 - 5-18	Antrim	James Stephens Park, Ballina; Referee: J Connors
24 February 2019	S Boland (0-7), S Coyne (0-2), D Huane (0-1), J Gallagher (0-1), E Ryan (0-1), C Phillips (0-1).		J McNaughton (1-9), N Elliott (2-0), R McCambridge (1-1); C Clarke (1-1), N McKeague (0-4); E O'Neill (0-1), C McCann (0-1), J O'Connell (0-1).	James Stephens Park, Ballina; Referee: J Connors

==== Division 2A Round 5 ====
3 March 2019	Kerry	3-15 - 0-08	Meath	FitzGerald Stadium; Referee: C McAllister
3 March 2019	S Conway (0-8); J Conway (1-3), P Boyle (1-1), J Brick (1-0), M Boyle (0-2); P Costello (0-1).		P O'Hanrahan (0-5), J Regan (0-2); J Toher (0-1).	FitzGerald Stadium; Referee: C McAllister

3 March 2019	Westmeath	2-12 - 0-06	Mayo	TEG Cusack Park; Referee: S Hynes
3 March 2019	D McNicholas (1-1), C Doyle (0-4), N Mitchell (0-4), J Bermingham (1-0), S McGovern (0-1); J Gilligan (0-1); B O'Mara (0-1).		C Higgins (0-2), J Gallagher (0-1), E Ryan (0-1), B Morley (0-1); S Kenny (0-1),	TEG Cusack Park; Referee: S Hynes

3 March 2019	Antrim	1-16 - 0-17	London	Corrigan Park
3 March 2019	J McNaughton (0-5), C McCann (1-1), R McCambridge (0-2); C Clarke (0-2), S Duffin (0-2), E O'Neill (0-1), N McKeague (0-1); N McManus (0-1), J Dillon (0-1).		A Sheehan (0-16), S Conlon (0-1).	Corrigan Park

=== Division 2A Final ===
10 March 2019; Final	Westmeath	0-12 - 0-10	Kerry	Cusack Park; Referee: R McGann (Clare); N Wall (Cork)
10 March 2019; Final	K Doyle 0-6 (2fs), N Mitchell 0-3 (3fs), D McNicholas, D Clinton, and A Devine (f) 0-1 each.	Report	S Conway 0-6 (4fs), P Boyle 0-2, D Collins and J Goulding (sideline) 0-1 each.	Cusack Park; Referee: R McGann (Clare); N Wall (Cork)

=== Division 2A relegation play-off ===
10 March 2019; Relegation play-off	London	1-10 - 0-16	Mayo	McGovern Park; Referee: S Stack
10 March 2019; Relegation play-off	A Sheehan (0-5), T Healy (1-1), C Allis (0-1), S Conlon (0-1); C Nelson (0-1); C McSweeney (0-1).	Report	S Boland (0-7, 5f), S Regan (0-4), E Ryan (0-2), J Gallagher (0-2), B Hunt (0-1).	McGovern Park; Referee: S Stack

=== Division 2A scoring statistics ===
Top scorers overall

Rank	Player	Team	Tally	Total	Matches	Average
1	James McNaughton	Antrim	2-45	51	5	10.20
2	Shane Conway	Kerry	2-45	40	4	10.00
3	Aaron Sheehan	London	0-35	35	5	7.00
4	Pádraig Boyle	Kerry	2-25	31	6	5.16
5	Shane Boland	Mayo	0-30	30	5	6.00
6	Pádraic O'Hanrahan	Meath	0-27	27	5	5.40
7	Niall Mitchell	Westmeath	1-23	26	6	4.33
8	Jack Goulding	Kerry	3-10	19	5	3.80
8	Derek McNicholas	Westmeath	2-13	19	6	3.16

Top scorers in a single game

Rank	Player	Club	Tally	Total	Opposition
1	Aaron Sheehan	London	0-16	16	Antrim
2	Shane Conway	Kerry	1-10	13	Westmeath
2	Shane Conway	Kerry	0-13	13	Antrim
3	James McNaughton	Antrim	1-09	12	Mayo
3	James McNaughton	Antrim	0-12	12	Kerry
4	James McNaughton	Antrim	1-08	11	Meath
4	James McNaughton	Antrim	0-11	11	Westmeath
5	Pádraig Boyle	Kerry	1-07	10	London
5	Shane Boland	Mayo	0-10	10	Meath
6	Niall Mitchell	Westmeath	1-06	9	London
6	Pádraig Boyle	Kerry	0-09	9	Mayo

== Division 2B ==
=== Division 2B Table ===
Division champions, promoted Relegated team

Team	Pld	W	D	L	F	A	Diff	Pts
Wicklow	5	4	0	1	8-82	2-82	+18	8
Derry	5	4	0	1	6-89	6-69	+20	8
Kildare	5	3	0	2	12-81	4-63	+42	6
Down	5	3	0	2	6-80	2-70	+22	6
Donegal	5	1	0	4	7-73	10-86	-22	2
Warwickshire	5	0	0	5	3-56	19-84	-80	0

=== Division 2B Rounds 1 to 5 ===
For official fixtures and results see National Hurling League Division 2B at gaa.ie

==== Division 2B Round 1 ====
26 January 2019	Warwickshire	0-11 - 2-20	Wicklow	Páirc na hÉireann; Referee: J Heffernan
26 January 2019	E McCabe (0-9), N Kennedy (0-1), I Dwyer (0-1).		E Donohoe (0-9), M Boland (1-2), J Henderson (1-2), E Kearns (0-3), D Staunton (0-3), C Moorehouse (0-1).	Páirc na hÉireann; Referee: J Heffernan

26 January 2019	Down	0-14 – 1-16	Derry	Páirc Esler; Referee: J Connors
26 January 2019	O McManus (0-5), P Sheehan (0-5), D Sands (0-2), C O'Prey (0-1), C Woods (0-1).		C O'Doherty (0-10), A Grant (1-0), J Mullan (0-2), P Cleary (0-1), M McGrath (0-1), N Ferris (0-1), N Waldron (0-1).	Páirc Esler; Referee: J Connors

27 January 2019	Donegal	1-13 - 2-16	Kildare	O'Donnell Park; Referee: S Hynes
27 January 2019	D Coulter (0-7); G Browne (1-0), C Matthewson (0-3), R McDermott (0-1); J Boyle (0-1), K Kealy (0-1).		B Byrne (1-5), B Deay (1-1), K Whelan (0-4), J Burke (0-1); R Casey (0-1), C Smith (0-1), P Divilly (0-1), R Boran (0-1); P McKenna (0-1).	O'Donnell Park; Referee: S Hynes

==== Division 2B Round 2 ====
2 February 2019	Kildare	8-19 - 0-06	Warwickshire	St Conleth's Park; Referee: N Wall
2 February 2019	B Byrne (3-14), K Whelan (1-2), B Deay (1-0), B Cormack (1-0), M Delaney (1-0), R Gavin (1-0), C Smith (0-2), P Divilly (0-1).		E McCabe (0-2), D O'Neill (0-2), K Magee (0-2).	St Conleth's Park; Referee: N Wall

3 February 2019	Wicklow	0-15 - 1-23	Down	Aughrim County Ground; Referee: T Walsh
3 February 2019	C Moorehouse (0-5), D Staunton (0-3); E Kearns (0-3), P Doyle (0-1), E Donohoe (0-1), M Boland (0-1), J Henderson (0-1).		P Sheehan (0-10), D Sands (1-4), C O'Prey (0-3), O McManus (0-3); C Coulter (0-1), E Sands (0-1), R McCrickard (0-1).	Aughrim County Ground; Referee: T Walsh

3 February 2019	Derry	3-18 - 0-12	Donegal	DEan McGlinchey Park; Referee: L Gordon
3 February 2019	C O'Doherty (0-8), M McGuigan (1-2), A Grant (1-1), N Ferris (1-1), R Mullan (0-2); J Mullan (0-2), N Waldron (0-1), S McGuigan (0-1).		D Coulter (0-8), C Matthewson (0-1), D Cullen (0-1), L Henderson (0-1), K Kealy (0-1).	DEan McGlinchey Park; Referee: L Gordon

==== Division 2B Round 3 ====
17 February 2019	Warwickshire	0-11 – 1-16	Down	Páirc na hÉireann; Referee: K Brady

17 February 2019	Donegal	0-15 - 2-14	Wicklow	O'Donnell Park; Referee: L Gordon
17 February 2019	L Henderson (0-10), D Cullen (0-2); C Matthewson (0-1), S McVeigh (0-1), D Duffy (0-1).		E McCormick (1-2), E Donohoe (0-4), J O'Neill (1-0), C Moorehouse (0-3), A O'Brien (0-2), D Staunton (0-1), W Kavanagh (0-1); L Evans (0-1).	O'Donnell Park; Referee: L Gordon

17 February 2019	Kildare	1-16 - 0-21	Derry	St Conleth's Park; Referee: S Hynes
17 February 2019	B Byrne (0-10), Cathal Dowling (1-0), P Divilly (0-2), B Cormack (0-2), Conor Dowling (0-1), J Gorman (0-1).		C O'Doherty (0-11), R Mullan (0-3), A Grant (0-2); S McGuigan (0-2), G Bradley (0-1), T Brady (0-1), J Mullan (0-1).	St Conleth's Park; Referee: S Hynes

==== Division 2B Round 4 ====
23 February 2019	Warwickshire	3-11 - 2-18	Derry	Páirc na hÉireann; Referee: N Wall
23 February 2019	N Kennedy (3-2), I Dwyer (0-2); J Collins (0-2), M O'Regan (0-1); C Boyle (0-1), P Scally (0-1), W Allen (0-1), E McCabe (0-1).		R Mullan (0-8), T McCloskey (1-1), T Brady (1-0); P Cleary (0-3), G Bradley (0-3), N Ferris (0-1), M McGrath (0-1), D Cartin (0-1).	Páirc na hÉireann; Referee: N Wall

24 February 2019	Down	3-21 - 1-15	Donegal	Páirc Esler; Referee: G McGrath
24 February 2019	D Sands (2-2), R Costello (0-5); P Sheehan (0-4, 4f), E Sands (1-0), O McManus (0-2), PJ Davidson (0-2), R McCrickard (0-1), C O’Prey (0-1); T Prenter (0-1), M Fisher (0-1, 1f).		L Henderson (0-5, 4f), D Cullen (0-5, 3f), R McDermott (1-1); S McVeigh (0-1), D Duffy (0-1), PJ McCarron (0-1), J Boyle (0-1).	Páirc Esler; Referee: G McGrath

24 February 2019	Wicklow	2-17 - 1-17	Kildare	Aughrim County Ground; Referee: T Walsh
24 February 2019	C Moorehouse (0-7), E Donohoe (1-3), A O'Brien (1-3), E McCormack (0-2), M Boland (0-1); J Doyle (0-1).		B Byrne (1-9), P Divilly (0-3); Cathal Dowling (0-3), J Burke (0-1), Conor Dowling (0-1).	Aughrim County Ground; Referee: T Walsh

==== Division 2B Round 5 ====
3 March 2019	Derry	0-16 - 2-16	Wicklow	Dean McGlinchey Park; Referee: C Cunning
3 March 2019	R Mullan (0-11), G Bradley (0-1), M McGuigan (0-1), M McGrath (0-1), J Mullan (0-1), D Cartin (0-1).		A O'Brien (1-2), C Moorehouse (0-5), E McCormack (1-0), E Donohue (0-3), J Henderson (0-2), J O'Neill (0-2), M Boland (0-1), L Evans (0-1).	Dean McGlinchey Park; Referee: C Cunning

3 March 2019	Donegal	5-18 - 0-17	Warwickshire	O'Donnell Park; Referee: J Clarke
3 March 2019	L Henderson (1-6), K Kealy (2-1), P Hannigan (1-3), R McDermott (1-2); O Rooney (0-2), C Matthewson (0-1); C Finn (0-1), R Hilferty (0-1), J De Ward (0-1).		J Collins (0-12), I Dwyer (0-5).	O'Donnell Park; Referee: J Clarke

3 March 2019	Kildare	0-13 - 1-06	Down	St Conleth's Park; Referee: C Mooney
3 March 2019	B Byrne (0-6); Conor Dowling (0-2), M Fitzgerald (0-2), Cathal Dowling (0-1), P Kennedy (0-1), J Sheridan (0-1).		C O'Prey (1-0); P Sheehan (0-3), O McManus (0-3).	St Conleth's Park; Referee: C Mooney

=== Division 2B Final ===
10 March 2019	Derry	0-08 - 1-09	Wicklow	Grattan Park; Referee: Thomas Walsh
10 March 2019	R Mullan 0-5 (4fs), B Rogers 0-2, S McGuigan 0-1.	Report	M Boland 1-0, C Moorehouse 0-2 (2fs), E McCormack 0-2, A O’Brien 0-2, E Kearns 0-2, E Donohue 0-1.	Grattan Park; Referee: Thomas Walsh

=== Division 2B relegation play-off ===
9 March 2019	Warwickshire	2-10 - 0-14	Donegal	Pearse Park (Longford); Referee: A Ferguson
9 March 2019	W Allen (0-7), K Magee (1-1), E McCabe (1-0), N Kennedy (0-1), J Collins (0-1).	Report	D Coulter (0-4), L Henderson (0-3), C Matthewson (0-2), J O'Loughlin (0-2), J Boyle (0-1); S McVeigh (0-1), K Kealy (0-1).	Pearse Park (Longford); Referee: A Ferguson

=== Division 2B scoring statistics ===
Top scorers overall

Rank	Player	Team	Tally	Total	Matches	Average
1	Brian Byrne	Kildare	5-44	59	5	11.80
2	Cormac O'Doherty	Derry	0-29	29	3	9.66
3	Richie Mullan	Derry	0-29	29	5	5.80
4	Lee Henderson	Donegal	1-25	28	5	5.60
5	Paul Sheehan	Down	0-27	27	5	5.40
6	Enda Donohoe	Wicklow	1-21	24	6	4.00
7	Christy Moorehouse	Wicklow	0-23	23	6	3.83
8	Declan Coulter	Donegal	0-19	19	3	6.33
9	Oisín McManus	Down	1-15	18	5	3.60
10	Daithí Sands	Down	3-08	17	3	5.66

Top scorers in a single game

Rank	Player	Club	Tally	Total	Opposition
1	Brian Byrne	Kildare	3-14	23	Warwickshire
2	Brian Byrne	Kildare	1-09	12	Wicklow
2	John Collins	Warwickshire	0-12	12	Donegal
3	Niall Kennedy	Warwickshire	3-02	11	Derry
3	Cormac O'Doherty	Derry	0-11	11	Kildare
3	Richie Mullan	Derry	0-11	11	Kildare
4	Cormac O'Doherty	Derry	0-10	10	Down
4	Paul Sheehan	Down	0-10	10	Wicklow
4	Lee Henderson	Donegal	0-10	10	Wicklow
4	Brian Byrne	Kildare	0-10	10	Derry

== Division 3A ==
=== Division 3A Table ===
Division final, winner promoted Automatic relegation to Division 3B

Team	Pld	W	D	L	F	A	Diff	Pts
Roscommon (P)	5	4	0	1	6-89	5-60	+32	8
Armagh	5	3	0	2	10-69	5-58	+32	6
Tyrone	5	3	0	2	10-80	7-75	+14	6
Monaghan	5	3	0	2	8-59	8-71	-12	6
Louth	5	1	0	4	7-50	3-82	-20	2
Lancashire	5	1	0	4	3-65	10-66	-22	2

- Armagh, Tyrone and Monaghan are ranked by score difference.
- Louth are ranked ahead of Lancashire because they won the head-to-head game between the teams.

=== Division 3A Rounds 1 to 5 ===
For official fixtures and results see National Hurling League Division 3A at gaa.ie

==== Division 3A Round 1 ====
26 January 2019	Lancashire	0-10 - 2-17	Tyrone	Abbotstown Centre of Excellence; Referee: C Mooney
26 January 2019	R Crowley (0-9), D Crowley (0-1).		D Casey (1-9), B McGurk (1-1), T Morgan (0-2); R McKernan (0-2), C Lagan (0-1), C Cross (0-1), D Begley (0-1).	Abbotstown Centre of Excellence; Referee: C Mooney

27 January 2019	Louth	1-12 - 3-18	Roscommon	Ecco Road; Referee: A Ferguson
27 January 2019	D Geoghegan (0-5), C Minogue (1-0), C Deane (0-2); D Kettle (0-1), A McCrave (0-1); J McDonnell (0-1); G McKeown (0-1), D O'Hanrahan (0-1).		S Curley (0-11), G Egan (2-0), C Mulry (1-3), P Kelly (0-3); D Heavey (0-1).	Ecco Road; Referee: A Ferguson

27 January 2019	Monaghan	0-05 - 4-11	Armagh	Grattan Park; Referee: J Clarke
27 January 2019	T Campbell (0-3), E Collins (0-2).		D McKenna (2-0), R Fullerton (0-5), E McGuinness (1-1), S Renaghan (1-0); D Magee (0-3), C Rice (0-1); N Curry (0-1).	Grattan Park; Referee: J Clarke

==== Division 3A Round 2 ====
3 February 2019	Tyrone	2-23 - 1-11	Louth	Healy Park; Referee: A Ferguson
3 February 2019	D Casey (1-10), R McKernan (1-4), T Morgan (0-4); C Lagan (0-2), C Kearns (0-1), M Mulgrew (0-1), B McGurk (0-1).		D Geoghegan (1-5), G McKeown (0-4), D Kettle (0-1), D Stephenson (0-1).	Healy Park; Referee: A Ferguson

3 February 2019	Roscommon	1-21 - 0-14	Monaghan	Dr. Hyde Park; Referee: J Connors
3 February 2019	C Dolan (0-7), P Kelly (0-6); C Egan (1-2), S Curley (0-3), D Heavey (0-1); M Kellehan (0-1), P Kenny (0-1).		S Lambe (0-8), P McGahon (0-2), C Power (0-1), T Hilliard (0-1), E Collins (0-1), C McKenna (0-1).	Dr. Hyde Park; Referee: J Connors

3 February 2019	Armagh	2-14 - 0-13	Lancashire	St. Oliver Plunkett Park

==== Division 3A Round 3 ====
Saturday 16 February 2019	Lanchashire	1-13 - 2-12	Louth	Abbottstown - GAA Centre of Excellence; Referee: Gearoid Mc Grath

Sunday 17 February 2019	Tyrone	2-13 - 4-12	Monaghan	Healy Park; Referee: James Connors

Sunday 17 February 2019	Armagh	1-11 - 0-18	Roscommon	Athletic Grounds; Referee: Chris Mooney

==== Division 3A Round 4 ====
Sunday 24 February 2019	Louth	2-6 - 2-17	Armagh

Sunday 24 February 2019	Monaghan	3-17 - 0-16	Lanchashire

Sunday 24 February 2019	Roscommon	1-26 - 1-11	Tyrone

==== Division 3A Round 5 ====
Sunday 3 March	Louth	1-10 - 1-11	Monaghan

Sunday 3 March	Lancashire	2-13 - 1-6	Roscommon

Sunday 3 March	Tyrone	3-16 - 1-16	Armagh

=== Division 3A Final ===
10 March 2019; Final	Roscommon	0-14 - 0-11	Armagh	Páirc Tailteann; Referee: T Gleeson (Dublin)
10 March 2019; Final	C Dolan 0-9 (7fs) C Mulry and P Kelly 0-2 each, S Curley 0-1 (1 65).	Report	D Magee 0-8 (6fs), N Curry; E McGuinness and D Gaffney 0-1 each.	Páirc Tailteann; Referee: T Gleeson (Dublin)

== Division 3B ==
=== Division 3B Table ===
Division final, winner promoted

Team	Pld	W	D	L	F	A	Diff	Pts
Sligo	4	4	0	0	11-63	3-44	+43	8
Longford (P)	4	3	0	1	6-47	5-52	-2	6
Fermanagh	4	2	0	2	6-52	4-47	+11	4
Cavan	4	1	0	3	4-33	9-54	-36	2
Leitrim	4	0	0	4	2-58	8-56	-16	0

=== Division 3B Rounds 1 to 5 ===
For official fixtures and results see National Hurling League Division 3B at gaa.ie

==== Division 3B Round 1 ====
Sunday 27 January 2019; 2pm	Cavan	2-9 - 1-11	Leitrim	Ballyconnell

Sunday 27 January 2019; 2pm	Sligo	2-14 - 1-16	Fermanagh	Kent Park, Ballydoogan

==== Division 3B Round 2 ====
Sunday 3 February 2019	Leitrim	0-19 - 2-14	Sligo	Páirc Seán Mac Diarmada

Sunday 10 February 2019; 2:00 pm	Fermanagh	2-7 - 1-16	Longford	Brewster Park; Referee: James Connors

==== Division 3B Round 3 ====
Sunday 17 February	Longford	2-18 - 0-16	Leitrim	Pearse Park; Referee: James Clarke

Sunday 17 February	Sligo	4-19 - 2-6	Cavan	Kent Park, Ballydoogan; Referee: Aidan Ferguson

==== Division 3B Round 4 ====
Sunday 24 February	Cavan	0-13 - 3-10	Longford	Breffni Park; Referee: Chris Mooney

Sunday 24 February	Leitrim	1-12 - 2-15	Fermanagh	Páirc Seán Mac Diarmada; Referee: Kevin Brady

==== Division 3B Round 5 ====
Sunday 3 March	Longford	0-3 - 3-16	Sligo

Sunday 3 March	Fermanagh	1-14 - 0-5	Cavan

=== Division 3B Final ===
Sunday 10 March	Sligo	3-10 - 2-15	Longford	Connacht GAA Centre of Excellence, Claremorris; Referee: James Clarke (Cavan)
Sunday 10 March	Gerard O'Kelly Lynch 1-7 (0-5f), Kevin Gilmartin 2-0, Eoin Comerford (f), Kevin Banks, Joe Starr 0-1 each	Report	David Buckley 1-3 (0-2f), Cathal Mullane 0-4 (3fs), Alan Sorohan 1-0, Bart Hanley 0-3 (1f, 1 '65), Enda Naughton and Reuben Murray 0-2 each, Shane O'Brien 0-1	Connacht GAA Centre of Excellence, Claremorris; Referee: James Clarke (Cavan)
