= David Kilcoyne (hurler) =

Irish hurler

Personal information
- Born: 1962 (age 63–64) Ringtown, County Westmeath

Sport
- Sport: Hurling
- Position: Forward
Club
- Years: Club
- Ringtown
Club titles
- Westmeath titles: 2
Inter-county
- Years: County
- 1979-1990's: Westmeath
Inter-county titles
- Leinster titles: 0
- All-Irelands: 0
- All Stars: 1

David Kilcoyne is a former hurler from County Westmeath, Ireland. He won Westmeath's first ever All Star Award in Football or Hurling in 1986. He won All-Ireland Senior B Hurling Championship medals in 1985 and 1991, and a Walsh Cup in 1982. He won two Westmeath Senior Hurling Championship medals with his club Ringtown in 1980 and 1987, as well as an Under 21 Championship medal. During his time playing at inter-county level, he was joined at different times by his brothers Michael, Padraic, James and Sean.
