= Hill of Ben =

Hill in Ireland

Coordinates: 53°41′0″N 7°13′0″W

Hill of Ben (Benigne)
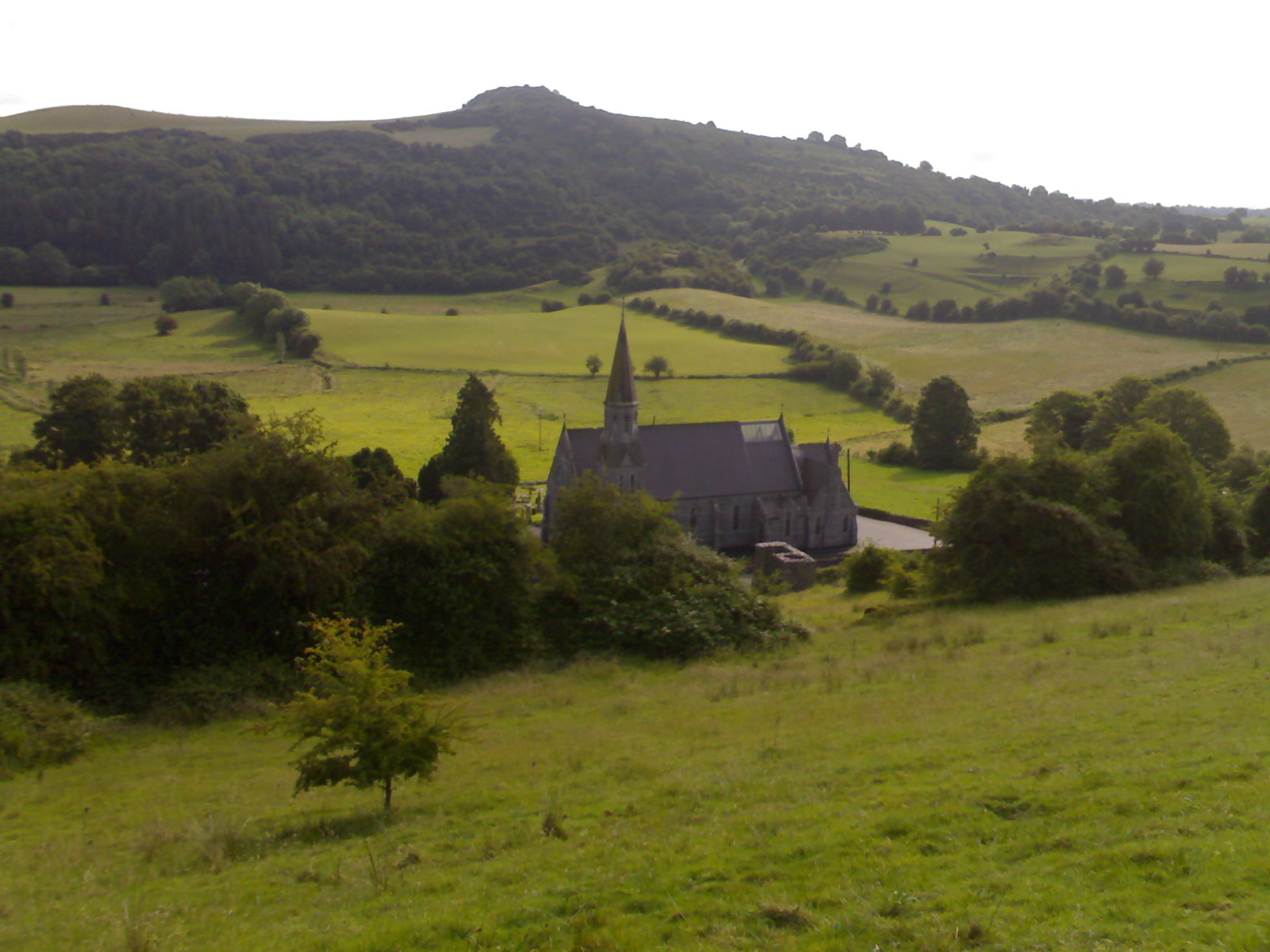
- Hill of Ben, Fore, County Westmeath

Highest point
- Elevation: 191 m (627 ft)
- Listing: Marilyn

Geography
- Location: County Westmeath, Ireland
- Parent range: Westmeath Hills

Hill of Ben is a rising hill situated in the Westmeath Hills, Ireland. The Hill of Ben dominates the valley where Fore Abbey resides. It rises sharply among the other surrounding hills that interlace with the many loughs of Westmeath to an elevation of 627'. Local legend has it that Saint Patrick's successor, named Benigne, is said to have preached from the hill to bring the gospel to local communities.
