= 2024 Kehoe Cup =

Tournament details
- Province: Leinster and Ulster
- Year: 2024
- Date: 14–27 January 2024
- Teams: 4
- Defending champions: Kildare

Winners
- Champions: Kildare (4th win)
- Manager: Brian Dowling
- Captain: Paddy McKenna

Runners-up
- Runners-up: Down
- Manager: Ronan Sheehan

Other
- Matches played: 4

The 2024 Kehoe Cup was an inter-county hurling competition in the province of Leinster, played by four county teams: three from Leinster and one (Down) from Ulster. It was the second level of Leinster/Ulster hurling pre-season competitions, below the 2024 Walsh Cup. Kildare were the winners, after winning their three games.

== Format ==
Each team plays the other teams in the competition once, earning 2 points for a win and 1 for a draw. The first-placed team wins the tournament.

== Table ==
| Pos | Team | Pld | W | D | L | PF | PA | PD | Pts |
|---|---|---|---|---|---|---|---|---|---|
| 1 | Kildare | 3 | 3 | 0 | 0 | 87 | 43 | +44 | 6 |
| 2 | Down (Note: Wicklow gave walkovers to both Down and Meath.) | 3 | 2 | 0 | 1 | 41 | 42 | −1 | 4 |
| 3 | Meath | 3 | 1 | 0 | 2 | 41 | 51 | −10 | 2 |
| 4 | Wicklow | 3 | 0 | 0 | 3 | 6 | 39 | −33 | 0 |

Source: Leinster GAA
