= 2026 Kehoe Cup =

Tournament details
- Province: Leinster and Ulster
- Year: 2026
- Date: 4–18 January 2026
- Teams: 3
- Defending champions: Kildare

Winners
- Champions: Wicklow (7th win)
- Manager: Jonathan 'Bosco' O'Neill
- Captain: Pádraig Doran

Runners-up
- Runners-up: Down
- Manager: Ronan Sheehan

Other
- Matches played: 3

The 2026 Kehoe Cup, known for sponsorship reasons as the Dioralyte Kehoe Cup, was an inter-county hurling competition in the province of Leinster, played by three county teams: two from Leinster and one (Down) from Ulster. It was the second level of Leinster/Ulster hurling pre-season competitions, below the 2026 Walsh Cup. Wicklow were the winners.

== Format ==
Each team plays each other team in the competition once, earning 2 points for a win and 1 for a draw. The first-placed team wins the tournament.

== Kehoe Cup ==
Pos	Team	Pld	W	D	L	PF	PA	PD	Pts
1	Wicklow	2	2	0	0	35	32	+3	4
2	Down	2	1	0	1	35	35	0	2
3	Meath	2	0	0	2	31	34	−3	0

Source: Leinster GAA
