= 2020 Kehoe Cup =

Gaelic competition

Tournament details
- Province: Leinster
- Year: 2020

Winners
- Champions: Offaly (1st win)
- Manager: Michael Fennelly
- Captain: Ben Conneely

Runners-up
- Runners-up: Antrim
- Manager: Darren Gleeson
- Captain: Conor McCann

The 2020 Kehoe Cup was an inter-county hurling competition in the province of Leinster and Ulster, played by six county teams.

The Kehoe Cup is ranked below the Walsh Cup. It took place between November 2019 and January 2020. Offaly were the winners.

== Format ==
The teams are drawn into two groups of three teams. Each team plays the other teams in its group once, earning 2 points for a win and 1 for a draw. The top two teams in each group advance to the semi-finals.

== Group stage ==
=== Group 1 ===
Pos	Team	Pld	W	D	L	PF	PA	PD	Pts	Qualification
1	Antrim	2	2	0	0	78	34	+44	4	Advance to semi-final
2	Meath	2	0	1	1	42	60	−18	1	Advance to semi-final
3	Wicklow	2	0	1	1	40	66	−26	1	

Source: Leinster GAA

30 November 2019 Round 1	Meath	1-15 (18) – (36) 3-27	Antrim	Navan
14:00 GMT (UTC±0)				Venue: Páirc Tailteann
		Report		Referee: Kieran Dooley (Offaly)

7 December 2019 Round 2	Wicklow	2-10 (16) – (42) 5-27	Antrim	Abbotstown
14:00 GMT (UTC±0)				Venue: National Games Development Centre
		Report

15 December 2019 Round 3	Wicklow	0-24 (24) – (24) 1-21	Meath	Aughrim
14:00 GMT (UTC±0)				Venue: Aughrim County Ground
		Report

=== Group 2 ===
Pos	Team	Pld	W	D	L	PF	PA	PD	Pts	Qualification
1	Offaly	2	2	0	0	61	42	+19	4	Advance to semi-final
2	Down	2	1	0	1	46	39	+7	2	Advance to semi-final
3	Kildare	2	0	0	2	30	56	−26	0	

Source: Leinster GAA

30 November 2019 Round 1	Offaly	2-28 (34) – (18) 0-18	Kildare	Birr
14:00 GMT (UTC±0)				Venue: St Brendan's Park
		Report		Referee: D Hughes

7 December 2019 Round 2	Kildare	0-12 (12) – (22) 0-22	Down	Newbridge, County Kildare
14:00 GMT (UTC±0)				Venue: St Conleth's Park
		Report

15 December 2019 Round 3	Offaly	1-24 (27) – (24) 2-18	Down	Abbotstown
14:00 GMT (UTC±0)				Venue: National Games Development Centre
		Report		Referee: Kevin Brady (Louth)

=== Knockout stage ===
4 January 2020 Semi-Final	Offaly	8-18 (42) – (27) 3-18	Meath	Birr
14:00 GMT (UTC±0)				Venue: St Brendan's Park
		Report		Referee: Barry Redmond (Wexford)

5 January 2020 Semi-Final	Antrim	2-19 (25) – (13) 0-13	Down	Belfast
				Venue: The Dub

12 January 2020 Final	Offaly	1-16 (19) – (18) 1-15	Antrim	Navan
14:00 GMT (UTC±0)				Venue: Páirc Tailteann
		Report		Referee: J McGrath (Westmeath)
