= Brendan Murtagh =

Westmeath hurler (born 1983)

Personal information
- Nickname: Goss
- Born: 1983 (age 42–43) Mullingar, County Westmeath, Ireland
- Occupation: Publican

Sport
- Sport: Hurling
- Position: Centre-forward
Clubs
- Years: Club
- Clonkill; The Downs
Club titles
	Football	Hurling
Westmeath titles	2	6
College
- Years: College
- Sligo Institute of Technology
College titles
- Fitzgibbon titles: 0
Inter-county*
Years	County	Apps (scores)
2001–2020	Westmeath	38 (7–64)
Inter-county titles
- Leinster titles: 0
- All-Irelands: 0
- NHL: 0
- All Stars: 0
- *Inter County team apps and scores correct as of 16:26, 3 July 2017.

Brendan Murtagh (born 1983) is an Irish hurler. His league and championship career with the Westmeath senior team spanned twenty seasons from 2001 until 2020.

Born in Mullingar, County Westmeath, Murtagh was educated at Mullingar Community College and later at Sligo Institute of Technology. He first played competitive hurling at juvenile and underage levels with Clonkill, before later joining the senior team. The highlight of Murtagh's club career was the winning of an All-Ireland medal in the intermediate grade in 2008. He also won a Leinster medal and six senior county championship medals. As a Gaelic footballer, Murtagh won two senior county championship medals with the Downs club.

Murtagh made his debut on the inter-county scene at the age of fifteen when he was selected for the Westmeath minor team. He enjoyed a successful tenure in this grade, culminating with the winning of an All-Ireland medal in 1999. Murtagh subsequently joined the Westmeath under-21 team, winning All-Ireland medals in 2000 and 2003. By this stage he had also joined the Westmeath senior team, making his debut during the 2001 championship. Over the course of the next seventeen seasons, Murtagh won three Christy Ring Cup medals. He also won a National League Division 2 medal in 2008. Murtagh played his last game for Westmeath in November 2020.

After missing out on selection for the Leinster inter-provincial team through injury, Murtagh was included on the starting fifteen in 2009. He was a regular in several campaigns and won two Railway Cup medals.

He has been a Westmeath senior hurling selector.

== Honours ==
Clonkill

- All-Ireland Intermediate Club Hurling Championship (1): 2008
- Leinster Intermediate Club Hurling Championship (1): 2007
- Westmeath Senior Hurling Championship (6): 2001, 2007, 2009, 2011, 2012, 2015

The Downs

- Westmeath Senior Football Championship (2): 2003, 2005

Westmeath

- Christy Ring Cup (3): 2005, 2007, 2010
- National Hurling League Division 2 (1): 2008
- Kehoe Cup (2): 2009, 2010
- All-Ireland Under-21 B Hurling Championship (2): 2000, 2003
- All-Ireland Minor B Hurling Championship (1): 1999

Leinster

- Railway Cup (2): 2009, 2012

Sporting positions
Preceded by	Westmeath Senior Hurling Captain; 2008	Succeeded by Paul Greville
