= 2022 Kehoe Cup and Shield =

Gaelic games competition in Ireland

2022 Kehoe Cup
Tournament details
- Province: Leinster
- Year: 2022
- Date: 16–30 January 2022
- Teams: 4

Winners
- Champions: Westmeath (9th win)
- Manager: Joe Fortune

Runners-up
- Runners-up: Carlow
- Manager: Tom Mullally

Other
- Matches played: 5

2022 Kehoe Shield
Tournament details
- Province: Leinster
- Year: 2022
- Date: 16–30 January 2022
- Teams: 3

Winners
- Champions: Wicklow (2nd win)
- Manager: Éamonn Scallan
- Captain: Marc Lennon

Runners-up
- Runners-up: Louth
- Manager: Paul McCormack

Other
- Matches played: 3

The 2022 Kehoe Cup was an inter-county hurling competition in the province of Leinster, played by four county teams. It was the second level of Leinster hurling pre-season competitions, below the 2022 Walsh Cup. It took place on 16–30 January 2022.

There was also the Kehoe Shield, historically a secondary tournament for teams eliminated in the early stages of the Kehoe Cup, but this year (as in 2019) a separate third-ranked competition for county teams.

Westmeath won the Cup, and Wicklow won the Shield.

== Format ==
Each team plays the other teams in a single round-robin format, earning 2 points for a win and 1 for a draw. The first-placed team wins the Kehoe Cup.

== Kehoe Cup ==
Pos	Team	Pld	W	D	L	PF	PA	PD	Pts	Qualification
1	Westmeath	3	3	0	0	80	48	+32	6	Kehoe Cup winners
2	Carlow	3	2	0	1	68	55	+13	4	
3	Meath (Note: Kildare v. Meath was not played.)	2	0	0	2	35	52	−17	0	
4	Kildare	2	0	0	2	39	67	−28	0	

Source: Leinster GAA

== Kehoe Shield ==
Pos	Team	Pld	W	D	L	PF	PA	PD	Pts	Qualification
1	Wicklow	2	2	0	0	48	28	+20	4	Kehoe Shield winners
2	Louth	2	1	0	1	44	35	+9	2	
3	Longford	2	0	0	2	26	55	−29	0	

Source: Leinster GAA
