= 2016 Kehoe Cup =

Tournament details
- Province: Leinster
- Year: 2016

Winners
- Champions: Kildare (2nd win)
- Manager: Joe Quaid
- Captain: Paul Divilly

Runners-up
- Runners-up: Maynooth University
- Manager: Liam Hogan

The 2016 Kehoe Cup is an inter-county and colleges hurling competition in the province of Leinster. The competition is ranked below the Walsh Cup and features second and third tier counties from Leinster. Kildare were the winners.

== Teams ==
County teams:

- Fingal
- Kildare
- Longford
- Louth
- Wicklow

Third level:

- Maynooth University
- St Patrick's–Mater Dei (a combination of Mater Dei Institute of Education and St Patrick's College, Drumcondra)
- Trinity College Dublin

== Results ==
=== Group 1 ===
Team	Pld	W	D	L	Pts	Diff
Kildare	3	3	0	0	6	+63
Trinity	3	2	0	1	4	–5
St Pat's—Mater Dei	3	1	0	2	2	–19
Longford	3	0	0	3	0	–39

- Longford 1-14 5-17 St Pats/Mater Dei, Newtownforbes
- Kildare 5-24 0-4 Trinity College, Hawkfield
- Longford 2-11 2-21 Trinity College, Glennon Brothers Pearse Park
- Kildare 5-16 3-9 St Pats/Mater Dei, Newbridge
- Kildare 3-13 Longford 0–7, Glennon Brothers Pearse Park
- Trinity College 4-15 St Pats-Mater Dei 0–7, Drumcondra

=== Group 2 ===
Team	Pld	W	D	L	Pts	Diff
Maynooth University	3	3	0	0	6	+40
Wicklow	3	2	0	1	4	+23
Louth	3	1	0	2	2	–26
Fingal	3	0	0	3	0	–37

- Wicklow 1-10 Maynooth University 3–15, Bray Emmets
- Louth 4-10 Fingal 1–17, Darver
- Wicklow 3-14 0-6 Louth, Ballinakill
- Fingal 0-11 7-14 Maynooth University, Swords
- Louth 2-10 3-18 Maynooth University, Darver
- Wicklow 3-14 0-12 Fingal

=== Final ===
7 February 2016
12:30 p.m.

Kildare	3-15 – 3-5	Maynooth University

Hawkfield
Referee: Alfie Devine (Westmeath)
