= 2023 Kehoe Cup =

Gaelic sports competition in Ireland

Tournament details
- Province: Leinster and Ulster
- Year: 2023
- Date: 5–29 January 2023
- Teams: 5

Winners
- Champions: Kildare (3rd win)
- Manager: David Herity
- Captain: James Burke

Runners-up
- Runners-up: Carlow
- Manager: Tom Mullally
- Captain: Darragh Foley

Other
- Matches played: 10

The 2023 Kehoe Cup is an inter-county hurling competition in the province of Leinster, played by five county teams. It is the second level of Leinster/Ulster hurling pre-season competitions, below the 2023 Walsh Cup. It was won by Kildare, who won all four of their games.

== Format ==
Each team plays the other teams in the competition once, earning 2 points for a win and 1 for a draw. The first-placed team wins the tournament.

== Table ==
Pos	Team	Pld	W	D	L	PF	PA	PD	Pts
1	Kildare	4	4	0	0	99	58	+41	8
2	Carlow	4	3	0	1	105	82	+23	6
3	Meath	4	2	0	2	86	91	−5	4
4	Down	4	1	0	3	83	106	−23	2
5	Wicklow	4	0	0	4	61	97	−36	0

Source: Leinster GAA
