= Paddy Deegan =

Irish hurler

Personal information
- Native name: Pádraig Ó Duíginn (Irish)
- Nickname: Deego
- Born: 23 September 1995 (age 31) Kilkenny, Ireland
- Occupation: Primary school teacher
- Height: 6 ft 1 in (185 cm)

Sport
- Sport: Hurling
- Position: Left corner-back
Club
- Years: Club
- 2012–: O'Loughlin Gaels
Club titles
- Kilkenny titles: 1
College
- Years: College
- Maynooth University
College titles
- Fitzgibbon titles: 0
Inter-county*
Years	County	Apps (scores)
2015–	Kilkenny	22 (0–7)
Inter-county titles
- Leinster titles: 4
- All-Irelands: 0
- NHL: 1
- All Stars: 0
- *Inter County team apps and scores correct as of 22:07, 17 July 2021.

Patrick Deegan (born 23 September 1995) is an Irish hurler who plays for Kilkenny Senior Championship club O'Loughlin Gaels and at inter-county level with the Kilkenny senior hurling team.

== Playing career ==
=== Kilkenny CBS ===
Deegan first came to prominence as a hurler with Kilkenny CBS and played in every grade of hurling before eventually joining the college's senior hurling team. On 3 March 2012, he was an unused substitute when Kilkenny CBS suffered a 2–09 to 1–10 defeat by local rivals St. Kieran's College in the Leinster final. Deegan was again on the substitutes' bench when Kilkenny CBS were beaten by Nenagh CBS by 3–10 to 2–11 in the All-Ireland final.

On 3 March 2013, Deegan lined out at left wing-back when Kilkenny CBS defeated St. Kieran's College by 2–09 to 1–07 to win the Leinster Championship. He was switched to centre-back for the All-Ireland final against Dungarvan Colleges on 6 April 2013, however, for the second successive year he ended the game on the losing side after a 1–12 to 1–07 defeat.

Deegan won a second successive Leinster Championship medal on 9 March 2014 after lining out at left wing-back in a 2–13 to 0–13 defeat of St. Kieran's College. He was again selected at left wing-back when Kilkenny CBS renewed their rivalry with St. Kieran's College on 5 April 2014, however, for the third year in-a-row Deeegan ended on the losing side after suffering a 2–16 to 0–13 defeat.

=== Maynooth University ===
As a student at Maynooth University, Deegan immediately became involved in hurling. On 5 February 2017, he lined out at centre-back when Maynooth University qualified to play Wicklow in the Kehoe Cup final. Deegan ended the game with a winners' medal after Maynooth University claimed the title for the first time in their history after a 1–23 to 2–11 victory.

=== O'Loughlin Gaels ===
Deegan joined the O'Loughlin Gaels club at a young age and played in all grades at juvenile and underage levels before eventually joining the club's top adult team in the Kilkenny Senior Championship.

On 30 October 2016, Deegan lined out at midfield when O'Loughlin Gaels faced Ballyhale Shamrocks in the Kilkenny Senior Championship final. He scored a point from play and ended the game with a winners' medal following a 0–19 to 1–12 victory.

=== Kilkenny ===
==== Minor and under-21 ====
Deegan first played for Kilkenny as a member of the minor team during the 2013 Leinster Championship. On 7 July 2013, he was an unused substitute when Kilkenny defeated Laois by 1–18 to 0–08 to win the Leinster Championship. Murphy ended the championship as the second-highest scorer with 4-45.

Deegan was drafted onto the Kilkenny under-21 team in advance of the 2015 Leinster Championship. He made his debut for the team on 2 June 2015 when he lined out iat left wing-back in Kilkenny's 4–12 to 2–16 defeat of Dublin in the quarter-final. On 8 July 2015, Deegan was again at left corner-back when Kilkenny suffered a 4–17 to 1–09 defeat by Wexford in the Leinster final.

Deegan was once again eligible for the under-21 grade in 2016. He made his final appearance in that grade on 25 May 2016 when he lined out at left wing-back in Kilkenny's 1–11 to 0–12 defeat by Westmeath in the quarter-final.

==== Senior ====
After being drafted onto the Kilkenny senior team as a member of extended training panel during the 2015 season, Deegan didn't make his first appearance for the team until 12 February 2017 when he came on as a 52nd-minute substitute for Ollie Walsh in a 1–15 to 0–17 defeat by Waterford in the 2017 National Hurling League. He made his Leinster Championship debut on 10 June 2017 when he scored a point from midfield in a 1–20 to 3–11 defeat by Wexford.

On 8 April 2018, Deegan lined out at left corner-back when Kilkenny faced Tipperary in the National League final. He ended the game with a winners' medal following the 2–23 to 2–17 victory. Deegan was again selected at left corner-back on 1 July 2018 when Kilkenny drew 0-18 apiece with Galway in the Leinster final. He retained his position for the replay a week later, however, Kilkenny suffered a 1–28 to 3–15 defeat.

On 30 June 2019, Deegan lined out at left wing-back when Kilkenny suffered a 1–23 to 0–23 defeat by Wexford in the Leinster final.

== Career statistics ==
As of match played 17 July 2021.

Team	Year	National League			Leinster		All-Ireland		Total	
Team	Year	Division	Apps	Score	Apps	Score	Apps	Score	Apps	Score
Kilkenny	2017	Division 1A	5	0-01	1	0-01	2	0-03	8	0-05
Kilkenny	2018	Division 1A	8	0-00	6	0-00	1	0-00	15	0-00
Kilkenny	2019	Division 1A	6	0-01	5	0-02	3	0-00	14	0-03
Kilkenny	2020	Division 1B	4	0-03	1	0-00	1	0-01	6	0-04
Kilkenny	2021	Division 1B	5	0-02	2	0-00	0	0-00	7	0-02
Career total			28	0-07	15	0-03	7	0-04	50	0-14

== Honours ==
Kilkenny CBS

- Leinster Colleges Senior Hurling Championship: 2013, 2014

Maynooth University

- Kehoe Cup: 2017

O'Loughlin Gaels

- Kilkenny Senior Hurling Championship: 2016, 2023
- Kilkenny Under-21 Hurling Championship: 2015

Kilkenny

- Leinster Senior Hurling Championship: 2020, 2021
- National Hurling League: 2018
- Leinster Minor Hurling Championship: 2013
