= 2013 National Hurling League =

82nd season of the National Hurling League

National Hurling League 2013
League details
- Dates: 23 February – 5 May 2013
- Teams: 34

League champions
- Winners: Kilkenny (16th win)
- Captain: Colin Fennelly
- Manager: Brian Cody

League runners-up
- Runners-up: Tipperary
- Captain: Shane McGrath
- Manager: Eamon O'Shea

Other division winners
- Division 1B: Dublin
- Division 2A: Laois
- Division 2B: London
- Division 3A: Fingal
- Division 3B: Longford

The 2013 National Hurling League commenced in February 2013. 34 GAA county hurling teams: 32 from Ireland (including Fingal but not Cavan), London and Warwickshire, contested it.

On the final day of fixtures in division 1A on 31 March, all six teams had a chance of either reaching the league semi-finals, or suffering relegation.

Kilkenny won the NHL, defeating Tipperary in the final by 2–17 to 0–20 in the final on 5 May in Nowlan Park. Michael Fennelly scored two goals and three points in the first half as Kilkenny led by 2–07 to 0–11. In the second half Lar Corbett and JJ Delaney were sent off in the 46th minute after they wrestled each other on the ground near the Kilkenny goal.

On 13 May Kilkenny's Lester Ryan was named as the GAA-GPA Hurler of the League for 2013. Ryan scored 1–10 in six games from midfield including 0–3 in the semi-final win over Galway and 0–3 in the final victory against Tipperary.

== Format ==
- Division 1A: Top three teams qualify for NHL semi-finals. Bottom two teams play a relegation playoff, with the losing team relegated.
- Division 1B: Top two teams play division final, with the winner being promoted and qualifying for NHL semi-final. Bottom two teams play a relegation playoff, with the losing team relegated.
- Divisions 2A and 3A: Top two teams play division final, with the winner being promoted. Bottom two teams play a relegation playoff, with the losing team relegated.
- Divisions 2B: Top two teams play division final, with the winner being promoted. Bottom team relegated.
- Division 3B: Top two teams play division final, with the winner being promoted.

The current format of the National Hurling League has been criticised by many including current managers, claiming that it's not benefitting the game in several counties.

== Division 1A ==
=== Division 1A ===
NHL semi-finals Relegation play-off

Team	Pld	W	D	L	F	A	Diff	Pts
Tipperary	5	3	0	2	10-85	4-93	10	6
Kilkenny (C)	5	3	0	2	6-81	8-71	4	6
Galway	5	2	1	2	7-71	6-81	-5	5
Waterford	5	2	1	2	3-72	4-75	-6	5
Cork (R)	5	1	2	2	6-78	4-80	4	4
Clare	5	2	0	3	4-86	10-73	-5	4

==== Fixtures and results ====
23 February 2013 Round 1	Cork	0-26 - 1-11	Tipperary	Páirc Uí Rinn, Cork
19:00	P Horgan (0-13, 10f), D Kearney (0-3), S Moylan (0-2), C Joyce (0-1), L O'Farrell (0-1), L McLoughlin (0-1), C McCarthy (0-1), W Egan (0-1), P O'Sullivan (0-1), C Lehane (0-1), M Walsh (0-1).	Report	J O'Dwyer (0-3), N McGrath (0-3f), E Kelly (1-0), J Forde (0-2), L Corbett (0-2), A Ryan (0-1).	Attendance: 6,381; Referee: B Kelly (Westmeath)

24 February 2013 Round 1	Galway	3-11 - 0-17	Kilkenny	Pearse Stadium, Galway
14:00	J Canning 0-6 (5fs, 165), D Glennon 1-1, D Hayes 1-1, N Healy 1-0, J Cooney 0-1, A Harte 0-1, D Collins 0-1.		R Power (0-8), R Hogan (0-4), A Fogarty (0-2), T Walsh (0-1), L Ryan (0-1), E Larkin (0-1).	Referee: D Kirwan (Cork)

24 February 2013 Round 1	Clare	1-17 - 2-15	Waterford	Cusack Park, Ennis
14:00	C Ryan 0-9 (0-5f, 0-1 ’65), T Kelly 1-4, S Morey 0-2, F Lynch, S O’Donnell 0-1 each.		J Dillon 1-5 (0-3f), S Prendergast 1-1, B O’Halloran 0-4, P Mahony 0-3 (0-3f), D Fives, B O’Sullivan 0-1 each.

10 March 2013 Round 2	Tipperary	2-17 - 1-19	Kilkenny	Semple Stadium, Thurles
14:00	E Kelly (0-9, 7f, 1'65), L Corbett (1-1), J O'Dwyer (1-0), P Bourke (0-2, 1f), P Maher (0-1), B Maher (0-1), N McGrath (0-1), S Bourke (0-1), S Callanan (0-1).	Report	R Power (0-9, 8f, '65), R Hogan (1-2), E Larkin (0-3, 1 sl), P Hogan (0-2, 1f), C Fennelly (0-1), M Ruth (0-1), A Fogarty (0-1).	Attendance: 5,697; Referee: M Wadding

10 March 2013 Round 2	Waterford	0-15 - 1-12	Cork	Fraher Field, Dungarvan
14:00	P Mahony (0-6f), B O'Halloran (0-3), S Prendergast (0-3), B O'Sullivan (0-2), S O'Sullivan (0-1).	Report	P Horgan (0-8, 5f, 1'65), S Moylan (1-1), C McCarthy (0-1), P O'Brien (0-1), C Lehane (0-1).	Referee: A Kelly

10 March 2013 Round 2	Clare	0-18 - 1-13	Galway	Cusack Park, Ennis
14:00	Colin Ryan 0-8 (0-7f), T Kelly, J Conlon 0-3 each, P Collins 0-2, S O'Donnell, F Lynch 0-1 each.	Report	J Canning 1-9 (1-8f), D Glennon, A Harte, A Smith, N Donoghue 0-1 each	Referee: C Lyons (Cork)

16 March 2013 Round 3	Cork	1-16 - 1-22	Clare	Páirc Uí Chaoimh, Cork
19:00	P Horgan 0-9 (0-8fs), L O’Farrell 1-0, S Harnedy, L McLoughlin and P O’Sullivan 0-2 each, D Kearney 0-1.	Report	Colin Ryan 0-12 (0-9fs), T Kelly 0-4, S O’Donnell 1-0, J Conlon 0-2, P O’Connor, Conor Ryan, N O’Connell and D Honan 0-1 each.	Referee: J Ryan (Tipperary)

18 March 2013 Round 3	Kilkenny	2-15 - 0-16	Waterford	Nowlan Park, Kilkenny
14:00	E Larkin (0-06, 5f), G Aylward (1-01), M Ruth (1-01), A Fogarty (0-03), R Hogan (0-02), L Ryan (0-01), C Fennelly (0-01).	Report	P Mahony (0-06, 5f), J Dillon (0-03), S O’Sullivan (0-02), S O’Keeffe (0-01), K Moran (0-01), B O’Halloran (0-01), S Walsh (0-01), M Shanahan (0-01).	Referee: J McGrath (Westmeath)

18 March 2013 Round 3	Galway	1-20 - 4-22	Tipperary	Pearse Stadium, Galway
14:00	J Canning (1-10, 1-7fs), D Glennon (0-02), N Healy (0-02), D Hayes (0-02), A Harte (0-02), I Tannian (0-01), C Donnellan (0-01).	Report	J O'Dwyer (1-06), S Callanan (0-07, 4fs, 265s), S Bourke (1-02), L Corbett (1-01), B Maher (1-00), J Woodlock (0-03), C O'Mahony (0-01), J Forde (0-01), S McGrath (0-01).	Referee: B Gavin (Offaly)

24 March 2013 Round 4	Clare	1-15 - 3-10	Kilkenny	Cusack Park, Ennis
14:00	Colin Ryan (0-11, 10f), C Galvin (1-0), T Kelly (0-1), S O'Donnell (0-1), J Conlon (0-1), D Honan (0-1).	Report	E Larkin (0-5, 4f, '65), A Fogarty (1-2), G Aylward (1-1), L Ryan (1-1), R Hogan (0-1).	Referee: A Stapleton (Laois)

24 March 2013 Round 4	Galway	2-12 - 2-12	Cork	Pearse Stadium, Galway
14:30	J Canning (0-10, 7f, 1sl), C Donnellan (1-2), D Hayes, D Glennon (1-0).	Report	P O'Sullivan (1-1), A Nash (1-0 pen), L McLoughlin (0-3), C McCarthy (0-2f), S Moylan (0-1), L O'Farrell (0-1), P Horgan (0-1f), P Cronin (0-1), W Egan (0-1), C Lehane (0-1).	Referee: J Owens

24 March 2013 Round 4	Waterford	1-14 - 0-16	Tipperary	Walsh Park, Waterford
14:30	J Barron (1-01), M O’Neill (0-04, 0-04f), P Mahony (0-04, 0-04f), J Dillon (0-02), K Moran (0-01), B O’Halloran (0-01), M Shanahan (0-01).	Report	S Callanan (0-10, 0-04f, 0-01 '65'), B O’Meara (0-02), S McGrath (0-01), N McGrath (0-01), S Bourke (0-01), L Corbett (0-01).	Referee: C McAllister (Cork)

31 March 2013 Round 5	Tipperary	3-19 - 1-14	Clare	Semple Stadium, Thurles
15:00	E Kelly 2-8 (1-6 frees); S Bourke 0-4; L Corbett 1-1; N McGrath 0-3; B Maher 0-2; M Cahill 0-1 each.	Report	Colin Ryan 0-8 (7 frees, 1 65); T Kelly 1-1; J Conlan 0-2; S Morey, Conor Ryan, F Lynch 0-1 each.	Referee: J Owens (Westmeath)

31 March 2013 Round 5	Kilkenny	0-20 - 2-12	Cork	Nowlan Park, Kilkenny
15:00	E Larkin 0-6 (5f 0-1 65); C Fennelly 0-4; R Hogan 0-4; R Power 0-3 (1pen); T Walsh, L Ryan, M Fennelly, 0-1 each.	Report	C Lehane 1-3; L Farrell 1-1; P Horgan 0-3 (3f); P O’Sullivan 0-2; S Moylan 0-2; D Kearney 0-1.	Referee: B Gavin (Offaly)

31 March 2013 Round 5	Waterford	0-12 - 0-15	Galway	Walsh Park, Waterford
15:00	M Shanahan 0-7 (5fs, 1 65), J Dillon, S Prendergast, B O’Halloran, S O’Sullivan, J Barron 0-1 each.	Report	J Canning 0-5 (3fs), D Glennon 0-4, I Tannian, N Burke 0-2 each, C Donnelan, D Burke 0-1 each.	Referee: A Stapleton (Laois)

== Division 1 Knockout ==
14 April 2013 Relegation play-off	Clare	0-31 - 2-23 (AET)	Cork	Gaelic Grounds, Limerick
15:00	Colin Ryan 0-10 (6f), T Kelly 0-6, J Conlon 0-4, C Galvin 0-3, D Honan, C McGrath 0-2 each, P Kelly (f), F Lynch, P Collins and C McInerney, 0-1 each.	Report	P Horgan 0-11 (6f, 1 65), P Cronin 1-3, L O’Farrell 1-2, C Naughton 0-2, C O’Sullivan, D Kearney, C Lehane, S Moylan and C McCarthy 0-1 each.	Referee: J McGrath (Westmeath)

21 April 2013 Semi-final	Tipperary	4-20 - 0-17	Dublin	Semple Stadium, Thurles
14:00	S Callanan (1-07, 1-0 pen, 0-2f, 1 65), S Bourke (1-01), J Forde (0-04, 1 sl), M Heffernan (1-00), Patrick Maher (1-00), P Bourke (0-03), N McGrath (0-03), S McGrath (0-01), L Corbett (0-01).	Report	D Sutcliffe (0-04), P Ryan (0-04, 3f, 1 65), D Treacy (0-03, 1f), D O’Callaghan (0-02), S Durkin (0-02), J Boland (0-01), C Keaney (0-01).	Referee: B Gavin (Offaly)

21 April 2013 Semi-final	Kilkenny	1-24 - 1-17	Galway	Semple Stadium, Thurles
15:45	E Larkin (0-10, 0-06f, 0-03 65s), R Hogan (0-05), C Fennelly (1-00), L Ryan (0-03), A Fogarty (0-02), M Rice (0-02), C Buckley (0-01), R Power (0-01).	Report	J Canning (0-08, 0-06f, 0-02 65s), C Donnellan (1-03), A Harte (0-02), J Cooney (0-01), D Burke (0-01f), D Hayes (0-01), A Smith (0-01).	Referee: D Kirwan (Cork)

5 May 2013 Final	Kilkenny	2-17 — 0-20	Tipperary	Nowlan Park, Kilkenny
15:30		Report		Attendance: 21,447; Referee: B Kelly (Westmeath)

=== Top scorers ===
==== Season ====
Rank	Player	County	Tally	Total	Matches	Average
1	Colin Ryan	Clare	0-58	58	6	9.67
2	Joe Canning	Galway	2-48	54	6	9.00
3	Patrick Horgan	Cork	0-45	45	6	7.50
4	Eoin Larkin	Kilkenny	0-31	31	6	5.16

==== Single game ====
Rank	Player	County	Tally	Total	Opposition
1	Eoin Kelly	Tipperary	2-8	14	Clare
2	Joe Canning	Galway	1-10	13	Tipperary
2	Patrick Horgan	Cork	0-13	13	Tipperary
4	Joe Canning	Galway	1-9	12	Clare
4	Colin Ryan	Clare	0-12	12	Cork
6	Colin Ryan	Clare	0-11	11	Kilkenny
6	Patrick Horgan	Cork	0-11	11	Clare
8	Séamus Callanan	Tipperary	1-7	10	Dublin
8	Eoin Larkin	Kilkenny	0-10	10	Galway
8	Joe Canning	Galway	0-10	10	Cork
8	Colin Ryan	Clare	0-10	10	Cork
8	Séamus Callanan	Tipperary	0-10	10	Waterford
13	John O'Dwyer	Tipperary	1-6	9	Galway
13	Colin Ryan	Clare	0-9	9	Waterford
13	Eoin Kelly	Tipperary	0-9	9	Kilkenny
13	Richie Power	Kilkenny	0-9	9	Tipperary
13	Patrick Horgan	Cork	0-9	9	Clare

== Division 1B ==
=== Division 1B ===
Division champions and promoted team Relegated team

Team	Pld	W	D	L	F	A	Diff	Pts
Limerick	5	4	1	0	6-90	7-71	+16	9
Dublin	5	4	0	1	11-81	4-73	+29	8
Offaly	5	3	0	2	6-73	2-84	+1	6
Wexford	5	2	1	2	6-81	5-82	+3	5
Antrim	5	1	0	3	5-74	6-86	–15	2
Carlow	5	0	0	5	2-63	12-66	–33	0

==== Fixtures and results ====
23 February 2013 Round 1	Dublin	1-20 - 2-16	Offaly	Parnell Park, Dublin
19:00	P Ryan 0-7, C Keaney 0-5, D Sutcliffe 1-2, C McCormack 0-3, J Boland, K Byrne, J McCaffrey 0-1 each.	Report	S Dooley 2-9, J Bergin 0-2, C Parlon 0-2, R Hanniffy, B Carroll, J Mulrooney 0-1 each.

24 February 2013 Round 1	Carlow	0-16 - 2-15	Wexford	Dr. Cullen Park, Carlow
14:00	S Kavanagh 0-05 (0-03f), M Kavanagh 0-04 (0-03f), J Kavanagh, M Brennan 0-02 each, JM Nolan, R Coady (0-01 ’65') 0-01 each.	Report	G Moore 0-09 (0-08f), P. Morris 1-02, R Jacob 1-00, D Redmond, A Kenny, G Sinnott, H Kehoe 0-01 each.	Referee: B Gavin (Offaly)

24 February 2013 Round 1	Limerick	1-19 - 0-19	Antrim	Gaelic Grounds, Limerick
14:00	D Hannon 0-09 (4f, 1 sl), S Hickey 0-04, D Breen 1-00, S Dowling 0-02, P Browne 0-02, G Mulcahy 0-01, J Ryan 0-01.	Report	N McManus 0-11 (8f), S Beattie 0-02, M Donnelly 0-01, K Stewart 0-01, KB McShane 00-1, S McNaughton 0-01, P Doherty 0-01, PJ O’Connell 0-01.	Referee: J Ryan (Tipperary)

10 March 2013 Round 2	Limerick	3-10 - 1-13	Carlow	Gaelic Grounds, Limerick
12:45	D Hannon 2-6 (1-5f), S Tobin 1-0, S Hickey, G Mulcahy, A Breen, P O'Brien 0-1 each.	Report	S Kavanagh 0-9 (0-6f), C Doyle 1-2, E Coady, S Murphy 0-1 each.	Referee: C McAllister (Cork)

10 March 2013 Round 2	Antrim	1-10 - 3-12	Dublin	Casement Park, Belfast
14:00	N McManus (0-6, 0-5f), S Beatty (1-0), K McKernan (0-1), P Shiels (0-1), Eddie McCloskey (0-1), K Stewart (0-1).	Report	P Ryan (1-5, 0-4f), D O’Callaghan (1-1), M Carton (1-0), J McCaffery (0-2), J Boland (0-1), D Sutcliffe (0-1), C McCormack (0-1), D Treacy (0-1).	Referee: C Browne (Galway)

10 March 2013 Round 2	Offaly	0-16 - 0-14	Wexford	O'Connor Park, Tullamore
14:00	S Dooley 0-7 frees, J Bergin 0-2, C Parlon 0-1, D Molloy 0-1, J Mulrooney 0-1, C Egan 0-1, T Carroll 0-1, O Kealey 0-1, D Morkan 0-1.	Report	P Morris 0-10 (0-7 frees), R Jacob 0-2, C O’Shaugnessy 0-1, R Kehoe 0-1 free.	Referee: S Hourigan (Limerick)

16 March 2013 Round 3	Wexford	2-21 - 1-12	Antrim	Wexford Park, Wexford
	R Jacob 1-5, P Morris 0-6 (0-1 f, 0-1 65), D Redmond 1-2, G Sinnott 0-3, E Quigley 0-2, H Kehoe, G Moore, E Martin 0-1 each.	Report	N McManus 0-6 (0-5 f), S Casey 1-0, S McCrory, N McAuley, C Laverty, P Shiels, S McNaughton, T McCloskey 0-1 each.	Referee: A Stapleton (Laois)

16 March 2013 Round 3	Dublin	1-15 - 1-21	Limerick	Croke Park, Dublin
	C McCormack 1-1, J Boland 0-4, P Ryan 0-3, 1f, A Nolan 0-2, 2f, D Sutcliffe 0-2, J McCaffrey 0-1, C Keaney 0-1, D O’Callaghan 0-1.	Report	D Hannon 0-9, 6f, G Mulcahy 1-3, K Downes 0-4, P Browne 0-2, N Moran 0-2, P O’Brien 0-1.	Referee: J Owens (Wexford)

18 March 2013 Round 3	Carlow	1-10 - 1-12	Offaly	Dr. Cullen Park, Carlow
14:00	M Kavanagh (0-04, 0-04f), C Doyle (1-00), S Kavanagh (0-03, 0-02f), M Brennan (0-01), E Coady (0-01), JM Nolan (0-01).	Report	J Bergin (1-02, 0-02f), S Dooley (0-05, 0-03f, 0-01 '65), B Carroll (0-02), C Egan (0-01), C Parlon (0-01), S Ryan (0-01).	Referee: S Cleere (Kilkenny)

24 March 2013 Round 4	Carlow	0-13 - 3-14	Antrim	Dr. Cullen Park, Carlow
	M Kavanagh (0-08, 0-07f), S Kavanagh (0-03, 0-03f), E Coady (0-02).	Report	N McManus (1-06, 0-05f), S McNaughton (1-1), S Beatty (1-00), E McCloskey (0-03), J McGreevy (0-02), S McCrory (0-01), N McAuley (0-01).	Referee: T Carroll (Offaly)

24 March 2013 Round 4	Wexford	0-15 - 3-19	Dublin	Wexford Park, Wexford
14:00	P Morris (0-3, 0-2f), É Martin (0-2, 0-2f), R Jacob (0-2), E Quigley (0-2), G Moore (0-3, 0-1 '65', 0-1f), D Redmond (0-1), H Kehoe (0-1), G Sinnott (0-1).	Report	D Treacy (0-6, 0-4f, 0-1 '65'), D O’Callaghan (1-3), C McCormack (1-3), É Dillon (1-0), D Sutcliffe (0-3), K Byrne (0-2), J Boland (0-1), S Lambert (0-1).	Referee: C Lyons (Cork)

24 March 2013 Round 4	Offaly	3-8 - 0-21	Limerick	O'Connor Park, Tullamore
14:00	S Dooley (2-6, 1-0 pen, 0-4f), C Egan (1-0), B Carroll (0-1), C Parlon (0-1).	Report	D Hannon (0-4, 0-4f), G Mulcahy (0-4), C Allis (0-4, 0-2f), K Downes (0-3), S Hickey (0-2), P Browne (0-2), W McNamara (0-1), G O'Mahony (0-1).	Referee: A Kelly (Galway)

31 March 2013 Round 5	Antrim	0-19 - 0-21	Offaly	Casement Park, Belfast
15:00	N McManus (0-12, 10f), P Shiels (0-2), S McCrory (0-1), E McCloskey (0-1), S McNaughton (0-1), T McCloskey (0-1), S McAfee (0-1).	Report	S Dooley (0-10, 7f, 0-1 sideline), C Slevin (0-7, 4f), B Carroll (0-1), R Hannify (0-1), K Brady (0-1), J Mulrooney (0-1).	Referee: A Kelly (Galway)

31 March 2013 Round 5	Dublin	3-15 - 0-11	Carlow	Parnell Park, Dublin
15:00	N McMorrow 2-1, P Ryan 0-7 (5fs), D Treacy 0-4fs, K Byrne 1-0, E Dillon, S Lambert, L Rushe 0-1 each.	Report	M Kavanagh 0-7 (6fs), S Kavanagh 0-2 (1f), D English, J Nolan 0-1 each.	Referee: C Browne (Galway)

31 March 2013 Round 5	Limerick	1-19 - 2-16	Wexford	Gaelic Grounds, Limerick
15:00	S Dowling 0-8 (5fs), A Breen 1-1, K Downes 0-3, C Allis 0-2, J Ryan, P Ahern, N Moran, S Tobin, P O’Brien 0-1 each.	Report	P Morris 0-5 (3fs), E Quigley, G Sinnott 1-1 each, R Jacob, E Martin (2 65, 1f) 0-3 each, L Chin 0-2, D Redmond 0-1.	Referee: D Kirwan (Cork)

6 April 2013 Final	Limerick	1-15 - 1-16	Dublin	Semple Stadium, Thurles
19:00	D Hannon (1-7), G Mulcahy (0-2), C Allis (0-2), S Hickey (0-2), P O’Brien (0-1), K Downes (0-1).	Report	P Ryan (1-8), J Boland (0-1), S Lambert (0-1), J McCaffrey (0-1), D Sutcliffe (0-1), C McCormack (0-1), D O’Callaghan (0-1), N McMorrow (0-1), D Treacy (0-1).	Referee: A Kelly (Galway)

14 April 2013 Relegation play-off	Antrim	0-15 - 0-11	Carlow	Páirc Tailteann, Navan

==== Top scorers ====
===== Season =====
Rank	Player	County	Tally	Total	Matches	Average
1	Shane Dooley	Offaly	4-37	49	5	9.80
2	Neil McManus	Antrim	1-41	44	5	8.80
2	Declan Hannon	Limerick	3-35	44	5	8.80
4	Paul Ryan	Dublin	2-30	36	5	7.20
5	Paul Morris	Wexford	1-26	29	5	5.80
6	Marty Kavanagh	Carlow	0-23	23	4	5.75
7	Shane Kavanagh	Carlow	0-22	22	5	4.40

===== Single game =====
Rank	Player	County	Tally	Total	Opposition
1	Shane Dooley	Offaly	2-9	15	Dublin
2	Shane Dooley	Offaly	2-6	12	Limerick
2	Declan Hannon	Limerick	2-6	12	Carlow
2	Neil McManus	Antrim	0-12	12	Offaly
5	Paul Ryan	Dublin	1-8	11	Limerick
5	Neil McManus	Antrim	0-11	11	Limerick
7	Declan Hannon	Limerick	1-7	10	Dublin
7	Paul Morris	Wexford	0-10	10	Offaly
7	Shane Dooley	Offaly	0-10	10	Antrim
10	Neil McManus	Antrim	1-6	9	Carlow
10	Gary Moore	Wexford	0-9	9	Carlow
10	Declan Hannon	Limerick	0-9	9	Antrim
10	Shane Kavanagh	Carlow	0-9	9	Limerick
10	Declan Hannon	Limerick	0-9	9	Dublin

== Division 2A ==
=== Division 2A ===
Promoted team Relegated team

Team	Pld	W	D	L	F	A	Diff	Pts
Laois	5	4	0	1	7-92	5-62	36	8
Westmeath	5	4	0	1	5–87	8-54	24	8
Kerry	5	4	0	1	8-63	7-66	0	8
Derry	5	2	0	3	4-65	6-70	-11	4
Wicklow	5	1	0	4	8-50	5-84	-25	2
Kildare	5	0	0	5	7-66	8-87	-24	0

==== Fixtures and results ====
24 February 2013 Round 1	Kerry	2-10 - 0-13	Westmeath	Austin Stack Park, Tralee
13:00	S Nolan 1-7 (0-3 frees, 0-1 ’65), A Boyle 1-1, P Boyle and S Maunsell 0-1 each.	Report	D McNicholas 0-4, N O’Brien 0-4 (0-1 free), E Price 0-2 (0-1 free), C Jordan, S Power and J Shaw 0-1 each.	Referee: S Hourigan (Limerick)

24 February 2013 Round 1	Derry	2-19 - 0-10	Wicklow	Celtic Park, Derry
14:00	R Convery 0-7 (5fs), N Ferris 1-3, K Hinphey 1-2, B Rodgers, A Grant 0-2 each, P Cleary, C Convery, O McCloskey 0-1 each.	Report	J O’Neill 0-7, G Weir, C Moorhouse, L Kennedy 0-1 each.	Referee: L McAuley (Antrim)

24 February 2013 Round 1	Kildare	1-10 - 1-19	Laois	St. Conleth's Park, Newbridge
14:00	P Divilly 1-5 (4fs, 1 65), R Hoban 0-2 (1f, 1 65), G Keegan 0-2, M Moloney 0-1.	Report	S Maher 0-9 (7fs), W Hyland 0-4, B Dunne 1-0, M Whelan 0-2 (65s), C Healy 0-1, J Walsh 0-1, Z Keenan 0-1, T Fitzgerald 0-1.

10 March 2013 Round 2	Wicklow	3-13 - 2-14	Kildare	Croke Park, Dublin
12:15	J O’Neill 0-7 (4f, 1 65’), M Lee 2-0, A O’Brien 1-2, R Keddy 0-2, W O’Gorman, E Kearns 0-1 each.	Report	D Harney 2-1, P Divilly 0-5 (3f, 1 65’), E O’Neill 0-3, G Keegan 0-2, M Moloney, B Nolan, T Murphy 0-1 each.

10 March 2013 Round 2	Westmeath	2-13 - 0-9	Derry	Cusack Park, Mullingar
12:45	N O'Brien (1-9), J Shaw (1-1), D McNicholas (0-1), J Clarke (0-1), M Keegan (0-1).	Report	R Convery (0-5), P Henry (0-2), P Cleary (0-1), O McCloskey (0-1).	Referee: F Horgan

10 March 2013 Round 2	Laois	2-20 - 2-12	Kerry	O'Moore Park, Portlaoise
14:00	S Maher 1-7 (1-0 pen, 5f), Z Keenan 0-5, A Collier 1-0, M Whelan (1f), Willie Hyland 0-2 each, B Dunne, J Brophy, T Fitzgerald, N Foyle 0-1 each.	Report	S Nolan 0-7 (7f), B O'Leary 1-1, A Boyle 1-0, P Boyle, J Griffin, D O'Connell, T Barrett 0-1 each.	Referee: S Cleere (Kilkenny)

16 March 2013 Round 3	Derry	1-17 - 1-14	Kildare	Celtic Park, Derry
	P Henry 0-8, 5f, 2 65; R Convery 1-3, 2f; A Grant 0-4; P Cleary 0-2.	Report	P Divilly 0-5, B Nolan 1-0, E O'Neill 0-2, G Keegan 0-3, D Butler 0-2, D Harney 0-1, M Moloney 0-1	Referee: G Duffy (Antrim)

16 March 2013 Round 3	Kerry	1-12 - 3-5	Wicklow	Austin Stack Park, Tralee
	S Nolan 1-5 (0-2 frees), D O’Connell 0-3 (0-1 free), P Boyle, D Collins, J Griffin and W O’Dwyer 0-1 each.	Report	W O’Gorman 1-1, J O’Neill 1-1 (0-1 free) A O’Brien 1-0, R Keddy 0-2, E Kearns 0-1.

18 March 2013 Round 3	Westmeath	2-18 - 2-15	Laois	Cusack Park, Mullingar
14:00	D McNicholas 0-12 (8f, 2 '65s’), N O’Brien 1-2 (0-1f), E Price 1-1, J Shaw 0-2, B Murtagh 0-1.	Report	T Fitzgerald and C Dwyer 1-0 each, M Whelan 0-5 (frees), S Maher 0-4 (1f), W Hyland 0-2, J Fitzpatrick (free), N Foyle, B Dunne and P J Scully 0-1 each.	Referee: P O'Dwyer (Carlow)

23 March 2013 Round 4	Kildare	1-16 - 2-16	Kerry	St. Conleth's Park, Newbridge
	P Divilly 0-7 (f); G Keegan 0-4, M Delaney 1-1, D Butler, B Nolan, P Reidy, R Kelly 0-1 each.	Report	S Nolan 2-10 (0-7f, 0-1 '65'), D O'Connell (1f), P Boyle 0-2 each, W Dwyer, J Griffin 0-1 each.	Referee: J O'Connell (Cork)

24 March 2013 Round 4	Wicklow	2-8 - 0-21	Westmeath	Arklow
	J O'Neill 0-5 (fs), M Lee, S Kinsella 1-0 each, B Osbourne 0-2, A O'Brien 0-1.		D McNicholas 0-7 (5fs), B Murtagh 0-4, A McGrath, A Price 0-3 each, J Boyle 0-2, R Greville and E Price 0-1 each.	Referee: P O'Dwyer (Carlow)

24 March 2013 Round 4	Derry	0-8 - 2-20	Laois	Celtic Park, Derry
	P Henry 0-5 (4fs), K Hinphey 0-2 and B Rodgers 0-1.	Report	Z Keenan 1-3, S Maher 0-5, W Hyland 0-5, T Fitzgerald 1-1, M Whelan 0-2, B Dunne, N Foyle, PJ Scully and C Dwyer 0-1 each.	Referee: O Elliott (Antrim)

31 March 2013 Round 5	Laois	0-18 - 0-14	Wicklow	O'Moore Park, Portlaoise
15:00	S Maher 0-3 (0-1f), M Whelan 0-3 (0-2f, 0-1 '65), B Dunne 0-3, J Brophy 0-3, W Hylan 0-3, Z Keenan 0-2, C Dwyer 0-1.		J O'Neill 0-9 (0-4 frees, 0-2 '65s), E Kearns 0-1, A O'Brien 0-1, C Moorehouse 0-1, R Keddy 0-1, M Lee 0-1.	Referee: J Heffernan (Wexford)

31 March 2013 Round 5	Westmeath	1-22 - 2-12	Kildare	Cusack Park, Mullingar
15:00	D McNicholas 0-8 (7fs), Anthony Price 1-2, B Murtagh 0-4 (1f), R Greville 0-3, J Shaw 0-2, E Price, A McGrath, T Gallagher 0-1 each.		P Divilly 0-8 (4fs), B Deay 1-1, D Harney 1-0, M Purcell 0-2, E O'Neill 0-1.	Referee: D Hughes (Carlow)

31 March 2013 Round 5	Kerry	1-13 - 1-12	Derry	Austin Stack Park, Tralee
15:00	S Nolan 0-5 (4fs, 1 '65), S Maunsell 1-1, A Boyle 0-2, D O'Connell (f), J Griffin, D Collins, B O'Leary and P Boyle 0-1 each.		M Kirkpatrick 1-5 (0-2fs), P Henry 0-3fs, B Rodgers, A Grant, K Hinphey and S Farren 0-1 each.	Referee: F Horgan (Tipperary)

14 April 2013 Relegation play-off	Kildare	2-12 - 0-12	Wicklow	O'Connor Park, Tullamore
14:00

14 April 2013 Final	Laois	3-14 - 1-09	Westmeath	O'Connor Park, Tullamore
15:45

==== Top scorers ====
===== Season =====
Rank	Player	County	Tally	Total	Matches	Average
1	Shane Nolan	Kerry	4-34	46	5	9.20
2	Paul Divilly	Kildare	1-30	33	5	6.60
3	Jonathan O'Neill	Wicklow	1-29	32	5	6.40
3	Derek McNicholas	Westmeath	0-32	32	5	6.40
5	Stephen Maher	Laois	1-28	31	5	6.20

===== Single game =====
Rank	Player	County	Tally	Total	Opposition
1	Shane Nolan	Kerry	2-10	16	Kildare
2	Niall O'Brien	Westmeath	1-9	12	Derry
2	Derek McNicholas	Westmeath	0-12	12	Laois
4	Shane Nolan	Kerry	1-7	10	Westmeath
4	Stephen Maher	Laois	1-7	10	Kerry
6	Jonathan O'Neill	Wicklow	0-9	9	Laois
6	Stephen Maher	Laois	0-9	9	Kildare
8	Michael Kirpatrick	Derry	1-5	8	Kerry
8	Shane Nolan	Kerry	1-5	8	Wicklow
8	Paul Divilly	Kildare	1-5	8	Laois
8	Paddy Henry	Derry	0-8	8	Kildare
8	Derek McNicholas	Westmeath	0-8	8	Kildare
8	Paul Divilly	Kildare	0-8	8	Westmeath

== Division 2B ==
=== Division 2B ===
Division champions and promoted team Relegated team

Team	Pld	W	D	L	F	A	Diff	Pts
Meath	5	5	0	0	9-90	4-59	46	10
London	5	4	0	1	6-85	7-60	22	8
Down	5	3	0	2	10-85	4-78	25	6
Mayo	5	1	1	3	8-67	8-84	-17	3
Armagh	5	1	0	4	7-66	13-80	-32	2
Roscommon	5	0	1	4	6-57	8-95	-44	1

==== Fixtures and results ====
24 February 2013 Round 1	Armagh	0-14 - 0-21	London	Athletic Grounds, Armagh
13:00	D Coulter (0-7), M Lennon (0-2), R McGrattan (0-1), K McKernan (0-1), D Carvill (0-1), C Carvill (0-1), C Corvan (0-1).	Report	G Hennelly (0-11), M Duggan (0-5), K Bolger (0-3), C McAlinden (0-1), S Lambert (0-1).	Referee: G Duffy

24 February 2013 Round 1	Down	1-18 - 2-16	Meath	Páirc Esler, Newry
14:00	P Braniff (1-10, 1 pen, 5f, 2'65's, 1 sl), T Toner (0-3), S Nicholson (0-2), M Ennis (0-1), C O'Prey (0-1), J Coyle (0-1).	Report	S Clynch (1-12, 1-7f, '65), B Slevin (1-1), P Durnin (0-2), P Conneely (0-1).	Referee: E Hasson

24 February 2013 Round 1	Mayo	1-15 - 0-18	Roscommon	McHale Park, Castlebar
14:00	K Feeney 0-13 (12f, 1 sl), K Higgins 0-2 (1f), S Regan, B Hunt and A Guiry 0-1 each.	Report	C Kelly 0-8 (8f), G Fallon 0-4 (2f), N Connaughton 1-0, E Kenny 0-2, R O'Meara 0-1.	Referee: J Keane (Galway)

2 March 2013 Round 3	Meath	2-17 - 1-11	London	St. Loman's Park, Trim
	S Clynch 0-7 (5fs); P Durnin 0-4; B Slevin, S Morris 1-1 each; J Kelly 0-3; D Magee 0-1.	Report	G Hennelly 0-4 (2fs); T Dunne 1-1; J Maher 0-2; M Finn 0-2 fs; S Lambert 0-1, M Duggan 0-1 (f).	Referee: J Keane (Galway)

10 March 2013 Round 2	Roscommon	2-11 - 3-15	Armagh	Athleague
13:00	Cathal Kelly (0-7), Cormac Kelly (1-1), M Kelly (1-0), G Fallon (0-2), D Nolan (0-1).	Report	D Coulter (1-8), C Corvan (2-2), P Hughes (0-1), K McKernan (0-1), R Gaffney (0-1), M Lennon (0-1), C Reid (0-1).	Referee: G Chapman (Sligo)

10 March 2013 Round 2	London	0-21 - 2-8	Down	Emerald GAA Grounds, Ruislip
13:00	G Hennelly (0-12), J Egan (0-2), S Lambert (0-2), D Healy (0-1), G Hill (0-1), H Vaughan (0-1), M Finn (0-1), S Keane (0-1).	Report	P Braniff (0-6), D Toner (1-1), K McGarry (1-0), C O'Prey (0-1).	Referee: D Hughes

10 March 2013 Round 2	Meath	1-19 - 1-11	Mayo	St. Loman's Park, Trim
14:00	S Clynch 0-9 (6s), A Gannon 1-1; B Slevin 0-3; P Conneely 0-2; P Durnin, S Morris, J Toher (f), E Marsh 0-1 each.	Report	K Feeney 0-8 (0-6fs); D O'Brien 1-0 (f); S Regan 0-2 (fs); G Nolan 0-1.	Referee: J Heffernan (Wexford)

16 March 2013 Round 3	Down	2-24 - 1-12	Roscommon	Páirc Esler, Newry
	P Braniff (0-12), G Johnston (1-3), D Toner (1-2), J Coyle, M Ennis (0-2 each), A Savage, P Sheehan, M Turley (0-1 each).		C Kelly (1-6)

16 March 2013 Round 3	Mayo	4-16 - 3-12	Armagh	McHale Park, Castlebar
	S Regan (2-6 3f), K Feeney (0-7, 5f), S Hoban (1-1), D O'Brien (1-0, 1 pen), D McDonnell (0-1), A Butler (0-1).	Report	D Coulter (1-6, 6f), C Coran (2-1), F Bradley (0-2), N Curry (0-2), K McKernan (0-1).

24 March 2013 Round 4	Mayo	1-11 - 3-13	London	McHale Park, Castlebar
12:30	K Feeney (1-5), S Regan (0-6).	Report	T Dunne (1-3), G Hennelly (0-6), M Duggan (1-1), L Hands (1-0), G Hill (0-1), J Egan (0-1), M Finn (0-1).	Referee: J Keane

24 March 2013 Round 4	Roscommon	0-9 - 1-20	Meath	Athleague
13:00	Cathal Kelly (0-4), A Murphy (0-2), Cormac Kelly (0-1), C Dolan (0-1), M Kelly (0-1).	Report	S Clynch (0-6), J Toher (0-4), E Marsh (1-0), B Slevin (0-3), A Gannon (0-2), P Conneely (0-2), M O'Sullivan (0-1), J Kelly (0-1), B Hanley (0-1).	Referee: G Quilty

24 March 2013 Round 4	Armagh	0-15 - 4-13	Down	Athletic Grounds, Armagh
14:00	D Coulter 0-7fs, C Corvan 0-3, J Corvan, D Carvill 0-2 each, R Gaffney 0-1.	Report	G Johnson 2-2, P Braniff 1-5 (0-4fs), J Coyle 1-0, S Nicholson 0-4, D Toner, C Baillie 0-1 each.	Referee: E Hassan (Derry)

30 March 2013 Round 5	London	2-18 - 2-10	Roscommon	Emerald GAA Grounds, Ruislip
15:00	J Maher (2-2), D Reale (0-8), K Walsh (0-3), S Frawley (0-2), D Moore (0-1), E Cooney (0-1), S Keane (0-1).	Report	Cathal Kelly (0-5), R O'Meara (1-1), T Seale (1-1), S Curley (0-1), G Fallon (0-1), E Kenny (0-1).	Referee: L McAuley

30 March 2013 Round 5	Meath	3-18 - 1-10	Armagh	Páirc Tailteann, Navan
15:00	B Slevin 1-5 (4fs), M O'Sullivan, B Hanley 1-1 each, N Kirby 0-3, A Gannon, A Ennis, P Conneely 0-2 each, J Kelly, D Magee (f) 0-1 each.	Report	M Lennon 0-5 (4fs), R Gaffney 0-3 (1f), C Reid 1-0, F Bradley, N Green 0-1 each.	Referee: G McGrath (Dublin)

30 March 2013 Round 5	Down	1-22 - 1-14	Mayo	Páirc Esler, Newry
15:00	P Braniff 0-6 (3fs), D Toner 1-2, P Sheehan 0-4, C Woods, S Nicholson 0-3 each, M Turley, E Clarke 0-2 each.	Report	K Feeney 0-6 (5fs, 1 '65'), S Regan 0-4 (2fs), S Hoban 1-0, D McTigue 0-2, P O'Flynn, D McDonnell 0-1 each.	Referee: P Murphy (Carlow)

14 April 2013 Final	Meath	1-14 - 1-16	London	St. Conleth's Park, Newbridge

==== Top scorers ====
===== Season =====
Rank	Player	County	Tally	Total	Matches	Average
1	Paul Braniff	Down	2-39	45	5	9.00
2	Kenny Feeney	Mayo	1-40	43	5	8.60
3	Stephen Clynch	Meath	1-34	37	4	9.25

===== Single game =====
Rank	Player	County	Tally	Total	Opposition
1	Stephen Clynch	Meath	1-12	15	Down
2	Paul Braniff	Down	1-10	13	Meath
2	Paul Braniff	Down	1-10	13	Roscommon
2	Kenny Feeney	Mayo	0-13	13	Roscommon
5	Seán Regan	Mayo	2-6	12	Armagh
5	Gerard Hennelly	London	0-12	12	Down
7	Declan Coulter	Armagh	1-8	11	Roscommon
7	Gerard Hennelly	London	0-11	11	Armagh

== Division 3A ==
=== Division 3A ===
Division champions and promoted team Relegated team

Team	Pld	W	D	L	F	A	Diff	Pts
Fingal	5	5	1	0	7-52	5-55	14	9
Donegal	5	4	0	1	11-78	4-56	33	8
Louth	5	3	1	1	8-59	3-66	8	7
Fermanagh	5	2	0	3	6-63	6-64	-1	4
Tyrone	5	1	0	4	3-54	9-63	-17	2
Monaghan	5	0	0	5	2-51	10-64	-37	0

==== Results ====
24 February 2013 Round 1	Fermanagh	2-12 - 1-11	Tyrone	Brewster Park, Enniskillen
14:00			D Casey 0-6 (5f), K Morgan 1-0, G Fox 0-2, M Mulgrew 0-2, J Connolly 0-1.

24 February 2013 Round 1	Donegal	3-18 - 1-6	Monaghan	O'Donnell Park, Letterkenny
14:00	L Henderson (0-8), S Boyle (2-2), P Hannigan (1-1), S McVeigh (0-2), R McDermott (0-2), J Donnelly (0-1), D Cullen (0-1), C Mathewson (0-1).	Report	M McHugh (0-5), M McKenna (1-0), A Mac Suibhne (0-1).	Referee: B Mac Suibhne

24 February 2013 Round 1	Fingal	0-15 - 1-12	Louth	Lawless Memorial Park, Swords
14:00

10 March 2013 Round 2	Louth	0-13 - 0-12	Fermanagh	Páirc Naomh Bríd, Dowdallshill
12:45

10 March 2013 Round 2	Tyrone	0-9 - 0-14	Donegal	Healy Park, Omagh
12:45	A Kelly (0-4), D Casey (0-4), K Morgan (0-1).	Report	L Henderson (0-7), P Sheridan (0-3), D Cullen (0-1), R McDermott (0-1), M McGee (0-1), E McDermott (0-1).

10 March 2013 Round 2	Monaghan	1-9 - 2-10	Fingal	Inniskeen
14:00	H Byrne (0-6), P Boyle (1-0), T Hilliard (0-2), É Mac Suibhne (0-1).	Report	J M Sheridan (0-6), B McCarthy (1-1), D Smyth (1-0), D Flood (0-3).	Referee: B Sweeney

16 March 2013 Round 3	Tyrone	0-15 - 2-11	Fingal	Healy Park, Omagh
14:00			J M Sheridan 0-6 (0-3f), D Smith 1-1, D Flood 1-0, B McCarthy 0-2, P Sheridan 0-1f, P Daly 0-1.

16 March 2013 Round 3	Fermanagh	1-20 - 4-14	Donegal	Brewster Park, Enniskillen
14:00

16 March 2013 Round 3	Louth	2-13 - 0-11	Monaghan	Páirc Naomh Bríd, Dowdallshill
16:00	S Fennell 0-6 (all frees), A Mackin 1-0, Ronan McAteer 1-0 (o.g.) N Stanley 0-2, D Mahony 0-2, G Smyth 0-1, D Dunne 0-1, B Corcoran 0-1.	Report	H Byrne 0-5 (all frees), É Mac Suibhne 0-4 (1 free), B McGuigan 0-1, C McKenna 0-1.

23 March 2013 Round 4	Fingal	1-16 - 2-10	Fermanagh	Croke Park, Dublin
17:45	JM Sheridan 0-9 (4f), D Smyth 1-2, B McCarthy 0-3, D Flood, P Daly 0-1 each.	Report	S Corrigan 1-4 (0-5f), R Porteous 1-1, J Duffy (1f), B McGarry 0-2 each, J P McGarry 0-1.	Referee: B Sweeney (Cavan)

24 March 2013 Round 4	Monaghan	0-15 - 2-14	Tyrone	St. Tiernach's Park, Clones
14:00	M McHugh (0-8), E Mac Suibhne (0-3), B McGuigan (0-2), C McKenna (0-1), S Leonard (0-1).	Report	D Casey (0-9), M Devine (1-0), K Morgan (1-0), T Morgan (0-3), G Gilmore (0-2).	Referee: J Keenan

24 March 2013 Round 4	Donegal	3-13 - 0-10	Louth	Brewster Park, Enniskillen
14:00	R McDermott (2-0), L Henderson (0-6), S Boyle (1-0), D Cullen (0-2), P Sheridan (0-1), E McDermott (0-1), S McVeigh (0-1), P Hannigan (0-1), C Matthewson (0-1).	Report	D Horan (0-3), D Murphy (0-2), N Stanley (0-2), D Mahony (0-1), G Smith (0-1), B Corcoran (0-1).	Referee: L McAuley

31 March 2013 Round 5	Donegal	1-9 - 2-11	Fingal	O'Donnell Park, Letterkenny
15:00

31 March 2013 Round 5	Fermanagh	1-9 - 0-10	Monaghan	Brewster Park, Enniskillen
15:00

31 March 2013 Round 5	Tyrone	0-15 - 5-11	Louth	Sigerson Park, Strabane
15:00

13 April 2013 Relegation play-off	Tyrone	1-16 - 2-15	Monaghan	Breffni Park
14:00	D Casey 0-8 (5f); M Mulgrew 1-4; M Devine 0-3; G Fox 0-1.	Report	M McHugh 1-9 (8f); S Leonard 1-0; F Rafter 0-2; B McGuigan, P Boyle, G Fox, C McKenna 0-1 each.	Referee: J Clarke (Cavan)

13 April 2013 Final	Fingal	1-9 - 1-5	Donegal	Breffni Park
	P Daly 1-0; D Flood 0-3; JM Sheridan (1f), D Smyth 0-2 each; B McCarthy, P McAllister 0-1 each.	Report	R McDermott 1-0; L Henderson (2f), C Mathewson 0-2 each; P Hannigan 0-1.	Referee: G Chapman (Sligo)

== Division 3B ==
=== Division 3B ===
Promoted team

Team	Pld	W	D	L	F	A	Diff	Pts
Longford	3	2	1	0	6–47	3-32	24	5
Sligo	3	2	0	1	5-33	5–33	0	4
Warwickshire	3	1	0	2	6-47	6-48	-1	2
Leitrim	3	0	1	2	3-35	6–49	-23	1

==== Fixtures and results ====
9 March 2013 Round 1	Warwickshire	0-14 - 3-14	Sligo	Páirc na hÉireann
19:00	C Robbins (0-11), D Sheedy (0-2), P Duggan (0-1).	Report	G Waldron (1-5), C Brennan (1-3), K Gilmartin (1-3), E McGowan (0-1), B Kenny (0-1), M Gilmartin (0-1).

10 March 2013 Round 1	Leitrim	1-13 - 0-16	Longford	Ballinamore
12:45	C Cunniffe (0-10), Z Moradi (1-1), K McGrath (0-1), S Fox (0-1).	Report	E Donnellan (0-13), J Newman (0-2), K Murray (0-1).	Referee: J Clarke

24 March 2013 Round 2	Longford	2-18 - 1-15	Warwickshire	Pearse Park, Longford
12:45	E Donnellan 1-11 (8fs, 1 '65'), K Connelly 1-3, J Newman 0-2, D Tanner (f), C Finucane 0-1 each.	Report	C Robbins 0-10 (10fs), A Morrissey 1-2, D Sheedy, M Bermingham, R McEntee 0-1 each.	Referee: G McGrath (Dublin)

24 March 2013 Round 2	Sligo	1-15 - 1-6	Leitrim	Markievicz Park, Sligo
14:00	G Waldron 1-5 (3fs), N Cadden 0-3 (1f), A Morrison, B McMahon, B Kenny 0-2 each, C Brenan 0-1;	Report	C Cunniffe 0-6 (5fs, 1 '65'), Z Moradi 1-0.	Referee: C Browne (Galway)

31 March 2013 Round 3	Warwickshire	5-18 - 1-16	Leitrim	Páirc na hÉireann, Birmingham
15:00	A O'Neill 3-1, C Robbins 0-9 (8fs), D Kelly 1-3, R McEntee 1-0, C Behan 0-3, A Morrissey 0-2.	Report	C Cunniffe 1-13 (12fs), S Fox, M Dolan, K O'Connor 0-1 each.	Referee: G McGrath

31 March 2013 Round 3	Longford	4-13 - 1-4	Sligo	Pearse Park, Longford
15:00	D Tanner 2-2 (1f), J O'Brien 1-4 (2fs), E Donnellan 0-5 (5fs), J Newman 1-1, K Conelly, L Kelly 0-1 each.	Report	C Brennan 1-0, G Waldron 0-2, C O'Mahony, L Reidy (f) 0-1 each.	Referee: J Keane (Galway)

14 April 2013 Final	Longford	1-8 - 0-9	Sligo

==== Top scorers ====
===== Season =====
Rank	Player	County	Tally	Total	Matches	Average
1	Eoin Donnellan	Longford	1-29	32	3	10.66
1	Clement Cunniffe	Leitrim	1-29	32	3	10.66
3	Connor Robbins	Warwickshire	0-30	30	3	10.00
4	Gary Waldron	Sligo	2-12	18	3	6.00

===== Single game =====
Rank	Player	County	Tally	Total	Opposition
1	Clement Cunniffe	Leitrim	1-13	16	Warwickshire
1	Eoin Donnellan	Longford	1-11	14	Warwickshire
2	Eoin Donnellan	Longford	0-13	13	Leitrim
3	Connor Robbins	Warwickshire	0-11	11	Sligo
4	Alan O'Neill	Warwickshire	3-1	10	Leitrim
4	Clement Cunniffe	Leitrim	0-10	10	Longford
4	Connor Robbins	Warwickshire	0-10	10	Longford

== Broadcasting rights ==
Setanta Sports and TG4 will provide live coverage of matches in Ireland with RTÉ providing highlights on Sunday nights. Setanta Sports broadcast live matches in Australia. Setanta Sports also provided coverage of matches from the National Hurling League to viewers in Asia.

Preceded by 2012 National Hurling League	National Hurling League	Succeeded by 2014 National Hurling League
