= 2019 Kehoe Cup and Shield =

Hurling competition

2019 Kehoe Cup
Tournament details
- Province: Leinster
- Year: 2019
- Sponsor: Bord na Móna

Winners
- Champions: Westmeath (8th win)
- Manager: Joe Quaid
- Captain: Tommy Doyle

Runners-up
- Runners-up: Antrim
- Manager: Neal Peden
- Captain: Conor McCann

The 2019 Kehoe Cup was an inter-county hurling competition based mainly in the province of Leinster in which Antrim from Ulster also took part.

The Kehoe Cup is ranked below the Walsh Cup (tier 1). Five county teams competed – Antrim, Kildare, Meath, Westmeath and Wicklow. It took place in December 2018 and January 2019. Westmeath were the winners.

The Kehoe Shield was revived in 2019. Three teams competed – Louth, Longford and DCU St. Patrick's Campus. Louth were the winners.

== Kehoe Cup ==
=== Kehoe Cup format ===
The competition begins with a double-elimination format. The semi-finals and final are knockout. Drawn games go to extra time. If the score is still level after extra time a penalty shoot-out is held to determine the winners.

The structure of the competition is explained in each of the rounds below.

=== Kehoe Cup first round ===
One team is given a bye to the playoff round. The remaining four teams meet in two matches – the two winners progress to the semi-finals and the two losers enter the playoff round.

9 December 2018 Game 1	Westmeath	2-22 (28) – (10) 1-07	Wicklow	Mullingar
14:00 GMT (UTC±0)				Venue: Cusack Park

9 December 2018 Game 2	Kildare	1-15 (18) – (18) 1-15 (a.e.t.) (0–2 pen)	Meath	Newbridge
14:00 GMT (UTC±0)				Venue: St. Conleth's Park
	Gls: S Kelly 1 Pts: B Byrne 7 (5f, 2 '65'), R Casey 2, K Whelan 1, C Dowling 1, B Deay 1, C Bonus 1, D Cahill 1, P Divilly 1	Report	Gls: C Smith 1 Pts: P O'Hanrahan 6 (4f), S Quigley 4, M Mullen 1, F Ferguson 1, S Geraghty 1, A Douglas 1, M O'Grady 1	Referee: Sean Stack (Dublin)
		Penalty shootout
	✗ ✗ ✗ ✗		Shane Quigley; ✗ ✗ Alan Douglas; ✗ Damian Healy

=== Kehoe Cup playoff round ===
In the first playoff match the team given a bye in the first round plays one of the two teams that lost in the first round. The winners progress to the semi-finals.

In the second playoff match the team that lost the first playoff match play the remaining team that lost in the first round. The winners progress to the semi-finals and the losers are eliminated.

16 December 2018 Game 3	Antrim	0-21 (21) – (13) 0-13	Wicklow	Abbotstown
				Venue: National Games Development Centre
		Report

6 January 2019 Game 4	Kildare	3-20 (29) – (10) 0-10	Wicklow	Newbridge
14:00 GMT (UTC±0)				Venue: St. Conleth's Park

=== Kehoe Cup semi-finals ===
The two winning teams from the first round play each other and the two winning teams from the playoff round play each other.

13 January 2019 Semi-Final	Westmeath	1-25 (28) – (16) 1-13	Meath	Kinnegad
14:00 GMT (UTC±0)				Venue: Coralstown/Kinnegad GAA Ground
	Gls: Niall Mitchell 1	Report	Gls: Barry Slevin 1

13 January 2019 Semi-Final	Antrim	4-20 (32) – (22) 1-19	Kildare	Abbotstown
14:00 GMT (UTC±0)		(HT: 3-10 – 0-08)		Venue: National Games Development Centre
		Report

=== Kehoe Cup final ===
20 January 2019 Final	Westmeath	2-20 (26) – (26) 1-23 (3–0 pen)	Antrim	Abbotstown
14:00 GMT (UTC±0)				Venue: National Games Development Centre
		Report
		Penalty shootout
	Niall Mitchell; Allan Devine; Killian Doyle		✗ James McNaughton; ✗ Nickey McKeague; ✗ Keelan Molloy

== Kehoe Shield ==
=== Kehoe Shield format ===
Each team plays the other teams once, earning 2 points for a win and 1 for a draw. The top two teams compete in the final.

=== Kehoe Shield group stage ===
Pos	Team	Pld	W	D	L	SF	SA	Diff	Pts
1	Louth	2	2	0	0	2-38 (44)	0-31 (31)	+13	4
2	DCU St. Patrick's Campus	2	1	0	1	2-31 (37)	3-33 (42)	–5	2
3	Longford	2	0	0	2	1-27 (30)	2-32 (38)	–8	0

=== Kehoe Shield final ===
13 January 2019
14:00 GMT (UTC±0)
Final

Louth	1-18 – 0-14	DCU St. Patrick's Campus
	Report

Darver GAA Centre of Excellence, Readypenny
Referee: Barry Nea (Westmeath)
