= Steven Clynch =

Meath hurler and manager

Personal information
- Native name: Stiofán Mac Loingsigh (Irish)
- Born: 1984 (age 41–42) Kilmessan, County Meath, Ireland
- Occupation: Branch manager

Sport
- Sport: Hurling
- Position: Left wing-forward
Club
- Years: Club
- 2001–: Kilmessan
Club titles
- Meath titles: 5
Inter-county
- Years: County
- 2002–2017: Meath
Inter-county titles
- Leinster titles: 0
- All-Irelands: 0
- NHL: 0
- All Stars: 0

Steven Clynch (born 1984) is an Irish hurling manager, selector and player. At club level he plays with Kilmessa, while he is a former player and manager of the Meath senior hurling team. Clynch is Meath's most decorated player and is regarded as one of their all-time greatest ever players.

== Playing career ==
Clynch first played hurling at juvenile and underage levels with Kilmessan, before progressing to the club's senior team in 2001. His first few seasons saw Kilmessan win three successive Meath SHC titles between 2002 and 2004. Clynch has won five SHC titles in all, with further victories over Kildalkey in 2008 and Longwood in 2013. He also claimed a Leinster Club IHC title in 2009.

Clynch first played for Meath with the minor team in 2002. His last game in the grade was an All-Ireland MBHC final defeat by Carlow in October 2002. Clynch progressed to the under-21 team and claimed an All-Ireland U21BHC medal following a 1–17 to 0–16 victory over Kerry in the 2005 All-Ireland U21BHC final.

By that stage, Clynch had already made his senior team debut. He claimed his first silverware in 2004 when he won the first of five Kehoe Cup medals. Clynch was part of Meath's Nicky Rackard Cup-winning team in 2009, but missed the final win over London after being sent off in the semi-final. He added a Christy Ring Cup medal to his collection in 2016 after scoring the winning point in the 4–21 to 5–17 defeat of Antrim in the final.

Clynch was selected for the Leinster inter-provincial team on two occasions and won a Railway Cup medal in 2009 after a defeat of Connacht in the final. He was also selected for the Ireland team for the Shinty–Hurling International Series on a number of occasions, ending up on the winning side on four occasions.

Clynch won a National Hurling League Division 2B title after a defeat of Wicklow in 2017. He announced his retirement from inter-county hurling in November 2017.

== Managerial career ==
Clynch joined Gavin Weir's management team as a selector with the Meath senior team in January 2021. He retained that role when Seoirse Bulfin took over as manager in August 2022. Clynch was part of the management team when Meath claimed National Hurling League Division 2B and Christy Ring Cup titles in 2023. Clynch was appointed interim manager following Bulfin's departure in 2024.

== Honours ==
=== Player ===
Kilmessan

- Leinster Intermediate Club Hurling Championship: 2008
- Meath Senior Hurling Championship: 2002, 2003, 2004, 2008, 2013

Meath

- Christy Ring Cup: 2016
- Nicky Rackard Cup: 2009
- National Hurling League Division 2B: 2017
- Kehoe Cup: 2004, 2008, 2011, 2014, 2015
- All-Ireland Under-21 B Hurling Championship: 2005

Leinster

- Railway Cup: 2009

Ireland

- Shinty–Hurling International Series: 2005, 2009, 2010, 2012

=== Management ===
Meath

- Christy Ring Cup: 2023
- National Hurling League Division 2B: 2023

Sporting positions
Preceded by Mick Cole	Meath senior hurling team captain 2008	Succeeded by Neil Hackett
Preceded by Michael Foley	Meath senior hurling team captain 2011	Succeeded by Enda Keogh
Preceded by Seoirse Bulfin	Meath senior hurling team manager 2024	Succeeded by Johnny Greville
