= Meath county hurling team =

Irish hurling team

Meath
- Sport: Hurling
- Irish: An Mhí
- Nickname(s): The Royals; The Plains men The Boys in Green
- County board: Meath GAA
- Home venue(s): Páirc Tailteann, Navan

Recent competitive record
- Last championship title: None
- Current NHL Division: 2 (4th in 2025)
- Last league title: None
First colours	Second colours

The Meath county hurling team represents Meath in hurling and is governed by Meath GAA, the county board of the Gaelic Athletic Association. The team competes in the Christy Ring Cup and the National Hurling League.

Meath's main ground is Páirc Tailteann, Navan, with St. Loman's Park, Trim known as the home of Meath Hurling. The team's manager is Seoirse Bulfin.

The team has never won the All-Ireland Senior Hurling Championship, Leinster Senior Hurling Championship, Joe McDonagh Cup, or the National League.

== History ==
Meath has twice held half-time leads over traditional hurling counties in the quarter-final of the Leinster Senior Hurling Championship (SHC): over Dublin by a scoreline of 2–2 to 1–1 in 1936 and Kilkenny by a scoreline of 2–6 to 1–6 in 1949.

In 1951, the county held Wexford to a draw in the quarter-final but lost the replay; Wexford went on to win the Leinster SHC and join the elite.

Having beaten Offaly to qualify for their ninth and last Leinster SHC semi-final in 1954, Meath regressed until it won the 1985 Kehoe Cup and the 1993 Senior B title.

After the county re-entered the senior championship in 1994, its exploits included victories over Offaly (All-Ireland SHC champions at the time) by a scoreline of 1–12 to 1–11 in a February 1995 National Hurling League match in Athboy, and Wexford by a scoreline of 1–16 to 0–16 a fortnight later in Enniscorthy.

On 11 July 2009, Meath won the final of the Nicky Rackard Cup at Croke Park, beating London by a scoreline of 2–18 to 1–15, thus promoting the county back to the 2010 Christy Ring Cup.

On 4 June 2016, Meath won the final of the Christy Ring Cup at Croke Park against Antrim by a scoreline of 2–18 to 1–20, despite trailing the Ulster squad by as much as six points at times. However, the score actually finished 2–17 to 1-20, a draw. Despite Meath being presented with the Christy Ring Cup, a replay was ordered. The replay took place at Croke Park on 25 June 2016. After normal time, the result was 3–15 to 4–12, another draw. Meath eventually prevailed after extra-time by a scoreline of 4–21 to 5–17, a Steven Clynch free with the last puck of the game sealing Meath's first ever Christy Ring Cup and a place in the 2017 Leinster Senior Hurling Championship, the county's first appearance in the championship since a double-scores defeat to Laois in mid-May 2004. The county secured a surprise victory against Kerry in its opening Leinster SHC match. This remains the county's most recent appearance in the competition.

Meath then won the Division 2B title, defeating Wicklow and earning promotion to Division 2A for 2018.

On 22 June 2019, Meath won the final of the Christy Ring Cup against Down at Croke Park by scoreline of 4–19 to 2–15. This was Meath's second Christy Ring Cup in three years. The win meant Meath would play in the 2020 Joe McDonagh Cup.

A dismal 2022 campaign would see Meath relegated from both Division 2A and the Joe McDonagh Cup. The latter in particular saw Meath finish with five heavy defeats, conceding 197 points with a -101 point-differential. Nick Weir would step down from his role as team manager in July. Seoirse Bulfin would be promoted as his replacement the following month.

== Management team ==
- Manager: Seoirse Bulfin, appointed August 2022
- Coaches:

== Managerial history ==
Seán Boylan ?

John Davis ?–1996

Tom Ryan 1996–1997

Séamus Carney 1997–1999

Noel Keating 1999**

John Davis (2) 1999–2001

Michael Duignan Offaly 2001–2003

John Hunt Clare 2003–2005

Johnny Murray 2005–2006

John Andrews Trim 2006–2008

T. J. Reilly 2008–2010

Cillian Farrell Offaly 2010–2014

Martin Ennis Clann na nGael 2014–2017

Nick Fitzgerald Waterford 2017–2019

Nick Weir Westmeath 2019–2022

Weir's coaching staff included David Reilly and (appointed ahead of the 2021 season) Steven Clynch, Johnny Enright and Timmy Hammerslewy

Seoirse Bulfin Limerick 2022–

**=In a caretaker role

== Players ==
=== Captaincy ===
- ?

=== Awards ===
- Champion 15:

2023: Sean Geraghty (Kilskyre–Moylagh), Simon Ennis (Rathmolyon), James Toher (Trim), Jack Regan (Kiltale), Éamon Óg Ó Donnchadha (Clann na nGael)

== Honours ==
=== National ===
- All-Ireland Senior Hurling Championship
  - (gold) Winners (0):
  - (silver) Runners-up (0):
- All-Ireland Senior B Hurling Championship
  - (gold) Winners (1): 1993
  - (silver) Runners-up (1): 1985
- All-Ireland Junior Hurling Championship
  - (gold) Winners (6): 1927, 1948, 1970, 1998, 1999, 2004
  - (silver) Runners-up (3): 1997, 2000, 2002
- Christy Ring Cup
  - (gold) Winners (3): 2016, 2019, 2023
- Nicky Rackard Cup
  - (gold) Winners (1): 2009
- National Hurling League Division 2B
  - (gold) Winners (1): 2017
- All-Ireland Under-21 B Hurling Championship
  - (gold) Winners (2): 2005, 2016
- All Ireland Minor B Hurling Championship
  - (gold) Winners (2): 2007, 2011

=== Provincial ===
- Kehoe Cup
  - (gold) Winners (7): 1993, 1996, 1998, 2004, 2008, 2011, 2014, 2015
- Leinster Junior Hurling Championship
  - (gold) Winners (10): 1927, 1948, 1961, 1970, 1972, 1998, 1999, 2002, 2003, 2004
- Leinster Minor Hurling Championship
  - (gold) Winners (1): 1929
