= 2014 Kehoe Cup =

Tournament details
- Province: Leinster, Ulster, Connacht
- Year: 2014
- Sponsor: Bord na Móna

Winners
- Champions: Meath (7th win)
- Manager: Cillian Farrell
- Captain: Seán Heavey

Runners-up
- Runners-up: Kildare

The 2014 Kehoe Cup was an inter-county and colleges hurling competition in the province of Leinster. The competition was ranked below the Walsh Cup and featured second and third tier counties and colleges from Leinster, Ulster and Connacht.

== Format ==
16 teams compete in a straight knockout tournament. Drawn games go to extra time; if drawn after extra time, a replay is played.

The 8 teams that lose in the first round go into the Kehoe Cup Shield, which is also a straight knockout tournament.

== Teams ==
County teams: (10)

- Derry
- Down
- Fingal
- Kildare
- Longford
- Louth
- Mayo
- Meath
- Roscommon
- Wicklow

Third level: (6)

- DCU
- Galway-Mayo Institute of Technology (GMIT)
- Maynooth University
- Queen's University Belfast
- St Patrick's College, Drumcondra
- Trinity College Dublin

== Results ==
=== Final ===
8 February 2014

Meath	1-21 – 0-19 (a.e.t.)	Kildare
Darren Reilly 0-8; Adam Gannon 1-4; Ciaran Fitzsimons 0-3; Willie McGrath 0-2; Peter Durnin, Stephen Morris, Derek Doran, Sean Heavey 0-1 each	Report

St. Conleth's Park, Newbridge

== Kehoe Shield ==
=== Final ===
9 February 2014

Mayo	1-17 – 0-15	Queen's University Belfast
	Report

Louth GAA Centre of Excellence, Darver
Referee: Killian Jones (Kildare)
