= 2017 Kehoe Cup =

Tournament details
- Province: Leinster
- Year: 2017
- Sponsor: Bord na Móna

Winners
- Champions: Maynooth University (1st win)
- Manager: Liam Hogan
- Captain: Brian Molloy

Runners-up
- Runners-up: Wicklow
- Manager: Séamus Murphy

The 2017 Kehoe Cup was an inter-county and university hurling competition in the province of Leinster. The competition is ranked below the Walsh Cup and features second and third tier counties from Leinster. Maynooth University were the winners.

== Format ==
The seven teams are drawn into one group of three teams and one group of four teams. Each team plays the other teams in its group once, earning 2 points for a win and 1 for a draw. The two group winners play in the final.

County teams

- Longford
- Louth
- Wicklow

Third level teams

- Maynooth University
- DCU St. Patrick's Campus (formerly St Patrick's College, Drumcondra)
- Trinity College Dublin
- Institute of Technology, Tallaght

== Player availability ==
Universities do not have ‘first call’ on hurlers from counties participating in the Leinster Championship Qualifier Group (i.e. Laois, Meath and Westmeath) or playing in the 2017 Christy Ring Cup (i.e. Carlow and Kildare) unless the hurler is in receipt of a college scholarship.

Universities have ‘first call’ on county hurlers up to a maximum of six, chosen from Dublin, Kilkenny, Offaly, Wexford and Galway.

After the Kehoe Cup group stage is completed hurlers who played with their university may play for their county in the final if their college did not qualify for the Kehoe Cup final.

== Group stage ==
=== Group 1 ===
Team	Pld	W	D	L	Pts	Diff
Maynooth University	2	2	0	0	4	+41
Louth	2	1	0	1	2	+2
Longford	2	0	0	2	0	–43

=== Group 2 ===
Team	Pld	W	D	L	Pts	Diff
Wicklow	3	3	0	0	6	+47
Trinity College	3	2	0	1	4	+16
DCU St. Patrick's Campus	2	0	0	2	0	–10
IT Tallaght	2	0	0	2	0	–53

- DCU v ITT not played.

== Final ==
5 February 2017
12 noon

Maynooth University	1-23 – 2-11	Wicklow
B Molloy (12f) 0-14, P Walsh 1-1, E Kenny 0-3, D Burke, D Egerton 0-2 each, MJ Lalor 0-1.	Report	A O'Brien 2-1, C Moorehouse (2f) 0-4, R Keddy 0-02, P Doyle, A Byrne, G O'Brien, D Staunton 0-1 each.

Pearse Park, Arklow
Referee: M O'Sullivan (Kilkenny)
