= 2013 Kehoe Cup =

Tournament details
- Province: Connacht, Leinster, Ulster
- Year: 2013
- Sponsor: Bord na Móna

Winners
- Champions: Kildare (1st win)
- Manager: Willie Sunderland
- Captain: Paul Divilly

Runners-up
- Runners-up: Meath
- Manager: Cillian Farrell

The 2013 Kehoe Cup, known for sponsorship reasons as the Bord na Móna Kehoe Cup, was an inter-county and colleges hurling competition in Ireland. The competition was ranked below the Walsh Cup and featured second- and third-tier counties and colleges from Leinster, Ulster and Connacht.

== Format ==
14 teams compete in a straight knockout tournament. Drawn games go to extra time; if drawn after extra time, a replay is played.

The 6 teams that lose in the first round go into the Kehoe Shield, which is also a straight knockout tournament.

== Teams ==
County teams: (9)

- Armagh
- Fingal
- Derry
- Down
- Kildare
- Louth
- Meath
- Roscommon
- Wicklow

Third level: (5)

- Dublin City University (DCU)
- Galway-Mayo Institute of Technology (GMIT)
- Queen's University Belfast (QUB)
- St Patrick's College, Drumcondra
- Trinity College Dublin

== Results ==
=== Final ===
10 February 2013

Kildare	2-11 – 0-13	Meath
Paul Divilly 1-4 (1-3 f); Tony Murphy 1-1; Mark Moloney 0-2; Kieran Divilly, Éanna O'Neill, Peader Downey, R. Kelly 0-1 each	Report

St. Loman's Park, Trim
Referee: John Keenan (Wicklow)

== Kehoe Shield ==
=== Final ===
16 February 2013

Mayo	0-19 – 1-14	Roscommon
	Report

St. Loman's Park, Trim
Referee: Killian Jones (Kildare)
