= Hurling in County Kildare =

Hurling in County Kildare is administered by the Kildare County Board of the Gaelic Athletic Association.

== County teams ==
The Kildare senior hurling team represents Kildare in the National Hurling League and the All-Ireland Senior Hurling Championship. There are also intermediate, junior, under-21 and minor teams.
