= 2011 Kehoe Cup =

Tournament details
- Province: Leinster
- Year: 2011
- Trophy: Kehoe Cup

Winners
- Champions: Meath (6th win)

The 2011 Kehoe Cup was an inter-county and colleges hurling competition in the province of Leinster. The competition is ranked below the Walsh Cup and features second and third tier counties from Leinster, Ulster, Connacht and selected university teams.

== Kehoe Cup ==
Preliminary round 9 January 2011
Fingal | 2-10
T.C.D | 1-09

First round 15/16 January 2011
Wicklow | 2-16
Fingal | 1-17
Roscommon | 2-10
Louth | 2-07
Armagh | 5-17
Carlow I.T. | 3-21

Quarter-finals; 23 January 2011
Wicklow | 2-15
Kildare | 2-09
D.C.U. | 2-23
Down | 4-15
Meath | 4-22
Roscommon | 1-15
G.M.I.T. | 4-14
Armagh | 2-17

Semi-finals; 30 January 2011
Wicklow | 4-15
D.C.U. | 1-11
Meath | 0-19
G.M.I.T. | 0-15

Final; 6 February 2011
Wicklow | 1-11
Meath | 0-16

=== Preliminary round ===
9 January 2011

| Fingal | 2-10 - 1-09 | T.C.D. |

Portmarnock

=== First round ===
15 January 2011

| Roscommon | 2-10 - 2-07 | Louth |

Termonfeckin
16 January 2011

| Armagh | 5-17 - 3-21 | Carlow I.T. |

Carlow I.T.
16 January 2011

| Wicklow | 2-16 - 1-17 | Fingal |

Swords

=== Quarter-finals ===
23 January 2011

| Wicklow | 2-15 - 2-09 | Kildare |

Rathdrum
23 January 2011

| D.C.U. | 2-23 - 4-15 | Down |

D.C.U.
23 January 2011

| Meath | 4-22 - 1-15 | Roscommon |

Trim
23 January 2011

| G.M.I.T. | 4-14 - 2-17 | Armagh |

Darver

=== Semi-finals ===
30 January 2011

| Wicklow | 4-15 - 1-11 | D.C.U. |

Rathdrum
30 January 2011

| Meath | 0-19 - 1-15 | G.M.I.T. |

Trim

=== Final ===
6 February 2010

| Wicklow | 1-11 - 0-16 | Meath |

Pearse Park, Arklow

== Kehoe shield ==
The Kehoe Shield was also held for the third time in 2011. Participating teams consisted of those teams knocked out of the preliminary and first rounds of the Kehoe Cup.

| First round 23 January 2011 | | Semi-finals; 30 January 2011 |
| Fingal | 1-09 |
| Louth | 1-14 | T.C.D. | 1-21 |
| T.C.D. | 0-25 | Louth | 2-14 |
| Carlow I.T. | 2-16 |

=== Semi-finals ===
23 January 2011

| Fingal | 1-09 - 1-14 | Louth |

Swords
23 January 2011

| T.C.D. | 0-25 - 2-16 | Carlow I.T. |

Ringsend

=== Final ===
30 January 2011

| Louth | 2-14 - 1-21 | T.C.D. |

Darver
