= 2018 Kehoe Cup =

Tournament details
- Province: Leinster
- Year: 2018
- Sponsor: Bord na Móna

Winners
- Champions: Longford (1st win)
- Manager: Colum O'Meara

Runners-up
- Runners-up: Wicklow "B"
- Manager: Séamus Murphy

Other
- Matches played: 7

The 2018 Kehoe Cup was an inter-county and university hurling competition in the province of Leinster. The competition is ranked below the Walsh Cup and featured weaker teams from Leinster.

Longford were the winners for the first time.

== Format ==
Each team plays the other teams in its group once, earning 2 points for a win and 1 for a draw. The top two teams play in the final.

County teams

- Longford
- Louth
- Wicklow B (second team; players who appeared in the Walsh Cup could not play in the Kehoe Cup team)

Third level team

- DCU St. Patrick's Campus

== Group stage ==
Team	Pld	W	D	L	Pts	Diff
Wicklow B	3	2	1	0	5	+25
Longford	3	2	0	1	4	–10
Louth	3	1	0	2	2	–3
DCU St. Patrick's Campus	3	0	1	2	1	–12

== Final ==
11 February 2018
2 p.m.

Wicklow B	0-10 – 0-11	Longford
C Moorehouse (0-3, 2f), G O’Brien (0-2), J Cranley (0-2), J Connors (‘65’), E McCormack and L Evans 0-1 each	Report	Joe O’Brien (0-4), Cathal Mullane (0-4,2f), Daire Duggan, Johnny Casey, Patrick Walsh 0-1 each

Pearse Park, Longford
Referee: J Kennedy (Kilkenny)
