= 2012 Kehoe Cup =

Tournament details
- Province: Leinster
- Year: 2012
- Trophy: Kehoe Cup

The 2012 Kehoe Cup is an inter-county and colleges hurling competition in the province of Leinster. The competition is ranked below the Walsh Cup and features second and third tier counties from Leinster, Ulster, Connacht and selected university teams.

== Kehoe Cup ==
First round 22 January 2012
Louth	0-10
Coláiste Phádraig	2-14
Fingal	2-10
D.C.U.	2-2
Roscommon	0-08
G.M.I.T.	2-17
Armagh	3-08
Trinity	2-17

Quarter-finals; 29 January 2012
Coláiste Phádraig	3-11
Wicklow	2-09
D.C.U.	1-09
Meath	1-17
G.M.I.T.	1-17
Kildare	1-16
Trinity	2-15
Down	2-14

Semi-finals; 5 February 2012
Coláiste Phádraig	5-16
Meath	1-16
G.M.I.T.
Trinity

Final; 12 February 2012
Coláiste Phádraig
Semi-final Winner

=== First round ===
22 January 2012

Louth	0-10 - 2-14	Coláiste Phádraig

Darver
22 January 2012

Fingal	2-10 - 2-22	D.C.U.

Swords
21 January 2012

Roscommon	0-08 - 2-17	G.M.I.T.

Athleague
22 January 2012

Armagh	3-08 - 2-17	Trinity

Middletown

=== Quarter-finals ===
29 January 2012

Coláiste Phádraig	3-11 - 2-09	Wicklow

Greystones
29 January 2012

D.C.U.	1-09 - 1-17	Meath

Navan
28 January 2012

G.M.I.T.	1-17 - 1-16 A.E.T.	Kildare

Newbridge
28 January 2012

Trinity	2-15 - 0-14	Down

Ringsend

=== Semi-finals ===
5 February 2012

Coláiste Phádraig	5-16 1-16	Meath

Pairc Tailteann, Navan
5 February 2012

G.M.I.T.	2-21 2-15	Trinity

Dublin

=== Final ===
12 February 2012

Coláiste Phádraig	1-13 2-18	G.M.I.T

== Kehoe shield ==
The Kehoe Shield was also held for the fourth time in 2012. Participating teams consisted of those teams knocked out of the first round of the Kehoe Cup.

First round 29 January 2012		Semi-finals; 5 February 2011
Louth	1-08
Fingal	1-12	Semi-final Winner
Roscommon		Fingal
Armagh

=== Semi-finals ===
29 January 2012

Louth	1-08 - 1-12	Fingal

Darver
5 February 2012

Roscommon	v	Armagh

Athleague

=== Final ===
12 February 2012

Fingal	v
