= 2008 Kehoe Cup =

Tournament details
- Province: Leinster
- Year: 2008
- Trophy: Kehoe Cup

Winners
- Champions: Meath (5th win)

The 2008 Kehoe Cup was an inter-county and colleges hurling competition in the province of Leinster. The competition is ranked below the Walsh Cup and features second and third tier counties from Leinster and Connacht and selected university teams. The winners were Meath who defeated Carlow 1–20 to 0–17 in the final.

== Kehoe Cup ==
First round 9/13/19/20 January 2008
Kildare	9-12
D.C.U.	2-07
D.I.T.	5-17
Mayo	0-14
Fingal	3-12
Tallaght I.T.	1-11
Longford	0-05
Carlow	3-15
Louth	1-17
Trinity College	3-16
Meath	1-16
Athlone I.T.	0-03
Wicklow	1-16
Carlow I.T.	2-09

Quarter-finals; 20/28 January 2008
Kildare	1-16
D.I.T.	1-21
Fingal	1-10
Carlow	1-13
Trinity College	1-05
Meath	2-27
Wicklow	3-20
Roscommon	3-13

Semi-finals; 3 February 2008
D.I.T.	0-10
Carlow	1-14
Meath	0-18
Wicklow	0-12

Final; 15 June 2008
Carlow	0-17
Meath	1-20

=== First round ===
All of the first round matches were originally due to take place in the week ending 13 January 2008. However, due to poor weather and waterlogged pitches, three matches were postponed until the weekend of 20 January 2008.

20 January 2008

Kildare	9-12 - 2-07	D.C.U.
	Report

Newbridge
13 January 2008

D.I.T.	5-17 - 0-14	Mayo
	Report

Ballymun
13 January 2008

Fingal	3-12 - 1-11	Tallaght I.T.
G De Loughrey 2-3, C Henry 0-3 (0-1f), R Lenihan 1-0, C O’Mahony, JM Sheridan 0-2 each, D Byrne, C O’Hare 0-1 each.	Report	S Durkin 1-2, M Ryan 0-5 (0-3f), S Lambert 0-3 (0-2 ‘65’), S Larkin 0-1.

Swords
20 January 2008

Longford	3-15 0-05	Carlow
	Report

Longford
9 January 2008

Louth	1-17 - 3-16	Trinity College
Collins Connolly; 1 - 10 ( 9F); Shane Kerrigan 0-3; Shane Callan 0-2 Diarmuid Murphy 0-1 and Gerard Smith 0-1.	Report	Mike Hyland 0-6 (3F); Harry Goff 1 - 2; Fergal Shalvey 0-4, John O'Kelly 1-0; Paddy Coyle 1-0; Ciaran Murphy 0-2 and Brian Fitzgerald 0-2 (2F).

Dundalk
13 January 2008

Meath	1-16 - 0-03	Athlone I.T.
N. Hackett 0-10, D. Raleigh 0-03, J. Keena 1-00, S. Clynch 0-02, A. Ennis 0-01	Report	K. Fagan 0-02, G. Murray 0-01

Páirc Tailteann
20 January 2008

Wicklow	1-16 - 2-09	Carlow I.T.
J O'Neill 0-07, E Mason 1-02, F Donnelly, G Bermingham 0-02 each, A O'Brien, S McGrath, E Maher 0-01 each.		N Kilcoyne 2-01, R Dunbar 0-04, M Egan 0-03, M Bergin 0-01.

Arklow

=== Quarter-finals ===
The quarter finals saw Meath, Carlow, Wicklow and D.I.T progress to the semi-finals.

20 January 2008

Meath	2-27 - 1-05	Trinity College
N Hackett 0-09, S Clynch 1-04, N Smith 0-04, K Dowd 1-01, G O'Neill, D Raleigh 0-03 each, M Horan, D Crimmins, M Dunne 0-01 each.		M Hyland 0-03, H Goff 1-00, K Murphy, Fl Chambers 0-01 each.

Páirc Tailteann

Kildare	1-16 - 1-21	D.I.T.

Newbridge

Fingal	1-10 - 1-13	Carlow

Swords

Wicklow	3-20 - 3-13	Roscommon

Bray

=== Semi-finals ===
3 February 2008

D.I.T.	0-10 - 1-14	Carlow

3 February 2008

Meath	0-18 - 0-12	Wicklow

=== Final ===
15 June 2008

Carlow	0-17 - 1-20	Meath
