= 2015 Kehoe Cup =

Tournament details
- Province: Leinster
- Year: 2015
- Sponsor: Bord na Móna

Winners
- Champions: Meath (8th win)
- Manager: Martin Ennis

Runners-up
- Runners-up: Wicklow

The 2015 Kehoe Cup was an inter-county and colleges hurling competition in the province of Leinster. The competition was ranked below the Walsh Cup and featured second and third tier counties from Leinster.

== Teams ==
County teams:

- Fingal
- Kildare
- Longford
- Louth
- Meath
- Wicklow

Third level:

- Maynooth University
- St Patrick's–Mater Dei (an amalgamation of Mater Dei Institute of Education and St Patrick's College, Drumcondra)

== Results ==
=== Final ===
8 February 2015

Meath	0-17 – 0-7	Wicklow
	Report

St. Loman's Park, Trim
Referee: Kevin Brady (Louth)
