= Seoirse Bulfin =

Irish hurling manager

Personal information
- Native name: Seoirse Bulfin (Irish)
- Born: 1979 (age 46–47) Bruff, County Limerick, Ireland
- Occupation: University Lecturer

Sport
- Sport: Hurling
- Position: Goalkeeper
Club
- Years: Club
- 1997–2017: Bruff
Club titles
- Limerick titles: 0
College(s)
- Years: College
- 1998–1999 1999–2003: University of Limerick; Mary Immaculate College
College titles
- Fitzgibbon titles: 0
Inter-county management
- Years: Team
- 2011 2011–2016 2016–2021 2021–2022 2022–2024 2024-2025: Waterford (coach); Clare (coach); Wexford (coach); Meath (coach); Meath (manager); Westmeath
Inter-county titles as manager
County	League	Province	All-Ireland
Clare Wexford	1; 0	0; 1	0; 1

Seoirse Bulfin (born 1979) is an Irish hurling manager and former player. He has had a close association as a coach with Davy Fitzgerald with a number of inter-county teams.

== Playing career ==
Bulfin first played hurling at juvenile and underage levels with the Bruff club. He eventually progressed onto the club's adult teams with whom he had a 20-year association before his retirement in 2017. As a student at Mary Immaculate College, Bulfin lined out for the college's senior team in the Fitzgibbon Cup and captained the team in his final year in 2003. At inter-county level, he was goalkeeper on the Limerick minor hurling team during the 1997 Munster MHC campaign.

== Coaching career ==
Buflin's coaching career began after being appointed GAA development officer at Limerick Institute of Technology in 2003. It was here that he began his close association with Davy Fitzgerald and he was part of the LIT management team for the Fitzgibbon Cup successes in 2005 and 2007. Bulfin joined Fitzgerald as coach to the Waterford senior hurling team in 2011 before later taking up the coaching role with the Clare senior hurling team. During his five-year tenure Clare won a first National Hurling League title in 38 years as well as the All-Ireland SHC title in 2013. The Fitzgerald-Bulfin combination later brought a Leinster SHC title to Wexford in 2019. He was appointed manager of the Meath senior hurling team in August 2022, having spent the previous year as team coach.

== Honours ==
Limerick Institute of Technology

- Fitzgibbon Cup: 2005, 2007

Ballyagran

- Limerick Senior Camogie Hurling Championship: 2011

Clare

- All-Ireland Senior Hurling Championship: 2013
- National Hurling League: 2016

Wexford

- Leinster Senior Hurling Championship: 2019

Sporting positions
Preceded by Nick Weir	Meath senior hurling team manager 2022–2024	Succeeded by Steven Clynch
Preceded by Joe Fortune	Westmeath senior hurling team manager 2024–	Succeeded by Incumbent
