= Connacht Senior Hurling League =

- Code: Hurling
- Founded: 2022
- No. of teams: 6 (2024)
- Title holders: New York (1st title)
- First winner: Roscommon
- Official website: Connacht GAA website

The Connacht Senior Hurling League is an annual inter-county hurling competition organised by the Connacht Council of the Gaelic Athletic Association (GAA) since 2022 for second and third-tier inter-county teams in the province of Connacht in Ireland. The competition runs each January.

The league provides an opportunity for the county teams to select their panel for the year and prepare for the National Hurling League (NHL).

Galway won the 2023 competition, defeating Roscommon by 1-25 to 1-20 in the final in January 2023.

New York are the title holders, defeating Mayo by 2-25 to 2-12 in the 2024 final.

== History ==
=== Beginnings ===
Established in 2022, the Connacht Senior Hurling League is a preseason competition for inter-county teams in the Connacht that compete in the lower tiers of the championship. The league is typically been used for preparation for the National Hurling League.

In the 2023 competition, Galway won the title with a 1-25 to 1-20 victory over Roscommon in the final. This marked Galway's inaugural success in the Connacht Senior League.

=== Participating teams ===
The league's creation in 2022 offered developing counties a structured competition that is a level playing field. Teams that have participated in the league include Leitrim, Mayo, Longford, New York, Roscommon, Sligo and a Galway development team. The inclusion of New York, Galway development teams and Longford from Leinster increased the number of matches the competitiveness of the league.

=== Shield ===
The Shield competition offers teams an additional opportunity to contend for honours. Leitrim and New York have won the shield.

== Teams ==
=== 2024 teams ===
The teams which are due to contest the 2024 competition include:

County	Province	In league since	League titles	Most recent title
Galway	Connacht	2023	1	2023
Leitrim	Connacht	2022	0	—
Mayo	Connacht	2022	0	—
New York		2023	1	2024
Roscommon	Connacht	2022	1	2022
Sligo	Connacht	2022	0	—

== List of finals ==
Year	Winners		Runners-up	
Year	County	Score	County	Score
2024	New York	2-25	Mayo	2-12
2023	Galway	1-25	Roscommon	1-20
2022	Roscommon	2-27	Sligo	1-21

== Roll of honour ==
County	Titles	Runners-up	Years Won	Years Runners-up
Roscommon	1	1	2022	2023
Galway	1	0	2023	—
New York	1	0	2024	—
Sligo	0	1	—	2022
Mayo	0	1	—	2024

== Shield ==
=== List of finals ===
Year	Winners		Runners-Up	
Year	County	Score	County	Score
2024	Galway	2-25	Roscommon	3-16
2023	New York	3-29	Leitrim	1-16
2022	Leitrim	2-24	Mayo	0-24

=== Roll of honour ===
County	Titles	Runners-up	Years Won	Years Runners-up
Leitrim	1	1	2022	2023
New York	1	0	2023	—
Galway	1	0	2024	—
Mayo	0	1	—	2022
Roscommon	0	1	—	2024

== Team records and statistics ==
=== Team participation ===
County	Province	Championship (Lvl)	Participation			Titles	
County	Province	Championship (Lvl)	No.	First year	Best result	League titles	Most recent title
Galway	Connacht	All-Ireland SHC (1)	2	2023	Winners	1	2023
Leitrim	Connacht	Lory Meagher Cup (5)	3	2022	Semi-Finals	0	—
Longford	Leinster	Lory Meagher Cup (5)	1	2023	Quarter-Finals	0	—
Mayo	Connacht	Nicky Rackard Cup (4)	3	2022	Runners-up	0	—
New York	North America	N / A	2	2023	Winners	1	2024
Roscommon	Connacht	Nicky Rackard Cup (4)	3	2022	Winners	1	2022
Sligo	Connacht	Christy Ring Cup (3)	3	2022	Runners-Up	0	—

== See also ==
- Leinster Senior Hurling League (Walsh Cup)
- Munster Senior Hurling League
- Ulster Senior Hurling League (Conor McGurk Cup)
