= 2010 Kehoe Cup =

Tournament details
- Province: Leinster
- Year: 2010
- Trophy: Kehoe Cup

Winners
- Champions: Westmeath (6th win)

The 2010 Kehoe Cup was an inter-county and colleges hurling competition in the province of Leinster. The competition is ranked below the Walsh Cup and features second and third tier counties from Leinster, Ulster, Connacht and selected university teams. The winners were Westmeath who defeated Kildare 1–15 to 1–11 in the final.

== Kehoe Cup ==
First round 23/24 January 2010
Roscommon	1-10
Wicklow	0-12
Down	3-23
Longford	0-04
Kildare	5-22
Armagh	2-13
Louth	2-09
Trinity College	0-08
D.C.U.	3-16
Fingal	3-09

Quarter-finals; 31 January 2010
Carlow I.T.	1-15
Roscommon	1-12
Westmeath	0-19
Down	0-18
Kildare	1-15
Louth	1-08
Meath	0-18
D.C.U.	1-14

Semi-finals; 6 February 2010
Carlow I.T.	1-11
Westmeath	2-26
Kildare	2-20
Meath	1-17

Final; 13 February 2010
Westmeath	1-15
Kildare	1-11

=== First round ===
23 January 2010

Kildare	5-22 - 2-13	Armagh

24 January 2010

Louth	2-09 - 0-08	Trinity College

24 January 2010

Roscommon	1-10 - 0-12	Wicklow

24 January 2010

Down	3-23 - 0-04	Longford

27 January 2010

D.C.U.	3-16 - 3-09	Fingal

=== Quarter-finals ===
31 January 2010

Meath	0-18 - 1-14	D.C.U.

Ashbourne
31 January 2010

Carlow I.T.	1-15 - 1-12	Roscommon

31 January 2010

Westmeath	0-19 -0-18	Down

31 January 2010

Kildare	1-15 - 1-08	Louth

=== Semi-finals ===
6 February 2010

Westmeath	2-26 - 1-11	Carlow I.T.

6 February 2010

Kildare	2-20 - 1-17	Meath

=== Final ===
13 February 2010

Kildare	1-11 - 1-15	Westmeath

== Kehoe shield ==
The Kehoe Shield was also held for the second time in 2010. Participating teams consisted of those teams knocked out of the first round of the Kehoe Cup. The eventual winners were Wicklow.

First round 31 January 2010		Semi-finals; 7/10 February 2010		Final; 14 February 2010
		Fingal	1-16
Armagh	4-13	Armagh	1-20
Trinity College	0-06			Armagh	1-17
				Wicklow	3-12
		Wicklow	3-22
		Longford	3-09

=== First round ===
31 January 2010

Armagh	4-13 - 0-06	Trinity College

=== Semi-finals ===
7 February 2010

Wicklow	3-22 - 3-09	Longford

10 February 2010

Armagh	1-20 - 1-16	Fingal

=== Final ===
14 February 2010

Wicklow	3-12 - 1-17	Armagh
