= 2009 Kehoe Cup =

Tournament details
- Province: Leinster
- Year: 2009
- Trophy: Kehoe Cup

Winners
- Champions: Westmeath (5th win)

The 2009 Kehoe Cup was an inter-county and colleges hurling competition in the province of Leinster. The competition is ranked below the Walsh Cup and features second and third tier counties from Leinster, Ulster, Connacht and selected university teams.

The winners were Westmeath who defeated Carlow 0–16 to 0–09 in the final.

== Kehoe Cup ==
First round 10/11 January 2009
Mayo	1-13
D.C.U.	0-09
Fingal	3-09
Louth	1-08
Wicklow	1-19
Trinity College	2-05
Roscommon
Longford	1-10
Kildare	2-06
D.I.T.	2-13
Down	2-16
Meath	1-12

Quarter-finals; 18 January 2009
D.C.U.	0-14
Fingal	1-06
Westmeath	1-10
Wicklow	1-13
Carlow	1-15
Roscommon	0-08
D.I.T.	3-18
Down	3-13

Semi-finals; 25 January 2009
D.C.U.	1-07
Westmeath	0-22
Carlow	1-10
D.I.T.	0-06

Final; 1 February 2009
Westmeath	0-16
Carlow	0-09

=== First round ===
10 January 2009

Kildare	2-06 - 2-13	D.I.T.

11 January 2009

Wicklow	1-19 - 2-05	Trinity College

11 January 2009

Fingal	3-09 - 1-08	Louth

11 January 2009

Down	2-16 - 1-12	Meath

11 January 2009

D.C.U.	1-13 - 0-09	Mayo

11 January 2009

Roscommon	3-08 - 1-10	Longford

=== Quarter-finals ===
18 January 2009

Westmeath	4.21 - 1-04	Wicklow

Bray
18 January 2009

D.C.U.	0-14 - 1-06	Fingal

Fingallians
18 January 2009

D.I.T.	3-18 - 3-13 A.E.T.	Down

Newry
18 January 2009

Carlow	1-15 - 0-08	Roscommon

Dr Cullen Park

=== Semi-finals ===
25 January 2009

D.I.T.	0-06 - 1-10	Carlow

Dr Cullen Park
25 January 2009

Westmeath	0-22 - 1-07	D.C.U.

Mullingar

=== Final ===
1 February 2009

Carlow	0-09 - 0-16	Westmeath
	Report

Kinnegad

== Kehoe shield ==
The Kehoe Shield was also held for the first time in 2009. Participating teams consisted of those teams knocked out of the first round of the Kehoe Cup. The eventual winners were Kildare.

Quarter-finals; 18/19 January 2009
Kildare	1-12
Meath	0-12
Louth	3-11
Trinity College	0-03

Semi-finals; 25 January 2009
Kildare	5-20
Longford	1-07
Louth	0-13
Mayo	0-12

Final; 1 February 2009
Kildare	4-16
Louth	1-02
