= Conor McGurk Cup =

Gaelic sports provincial competition

- Code: Hurling
- Founded: 2018; 8 years ago
- Region: Ulster (GAA)
- Trophy: Conor McGurk Cup Trophy
- No. of teams: 10 (as of 2023)
- Title holders: Donegal (1st title)
- Sponsors: Bank of Ireland (as of 2018)

The Conor McGurk Cup is an annual hurling competition organised by the Ulster Council of the Gaelic Athletic Association. It has been held annually since 2018.

The series of games are played during January. The McGurk Cup is effectively a pre-season tournament, allowing teams to experiment prior to the opening of the National Hurling League.

The 2019 competition, the third year of the event, involved nine teams competing in three sections. The 2022 tournament involved seven teams, including both county teams and college teams.

The Down county hurling team won the 2022 final, followed by Donegal in the 2023 competition.

== Teams ==
As of 2023 the competition involved 10 teams, including:

Teams (10)	County / University	Province	Cup titles	Last cup title
Antrim	County	Ulster	3	2021
Armagh	County	Ulster	0	—
Cavan	County	Ulster	0	—
Donegal	County	Ulster	2	2024
Down	County	Ulster	2	2022
Fermanagh	County	Ulster	0	—
Louth	County	Leinster	0	—
Monaghan	County	Ulster	0	—
Queen's University Belfast	University	Ulster	0	—
Ulster University	University	Ulster	0	—

== List of finals ==
Year	Winners		Runners-up		#
Year	Team	Score	Team	Score	#
2026	Derry	1–14	Donegal	0–16	
2025	No competition				
2024	Donegal	2-25	Down	0-22	
2023	Donegal	5-28	Ulster University	0-21	
2022	Down	1-22	Donegal	2-18	
2021	Antrim	4-24	Down	1-19	
2020	Antrim	2-19	Down	0-13	
2019	Down	1-19	Ulster University	0-19	
2018	Antrim	3-26	Down	1-14	

== Roll of honour ==
County	Titles	Runners-up	Years Won	Years Runners-up
Antrim	3	0	2018, 2020, 2021	—
Down	2	4	2019, 2022	2018, 2020, 2021, 2024
Donegal	2	1	2023, 2024	2022
Ulster University	0	2	—	2019, 2023

== See also ==
- Connacht Senior Hurling League
- Leinster Senior Hurling League (Walsh Cup)
- Munster Senior Hurling League
