= Derek McNicholas =

Irish hurler

Personal information
- Born: 1985 (age 40–41) Castlepollard, County Westmeath, Ireland

Sport
- Sport: Hurling
- Position: Full-forward
Club
- Years: Club
- 2001-present: Lough Lene Gaels
Club titles
- Westmeath titles: 1
Inter-county*
Years	County	Apps (scores)
2004-present	Westmeath	29 (12-55)
Inter-county titles
- Leinster titles: 0
- All-Irelands: 0
- NHL: 0
- All Stars: 0
- *Inter County team apps and scores correct as of 01:20, 8 May 2016.

Derek McNicholas (born 1984 in Castlepollard, County Westmeath) is an Irish sportsperson. He plays hurling with his local club Lough Lene Gaels and has been a member of the Westmeath senior inter-county team since 2004.
