= Cillian Farrell =

Irish hurler and Gaelic footballer (born 1977)

Ciall Farrell
Personal information
- Native name: Cillian Ó Fearrghaíll (Irish)
- Born: 1977 (age 48–49) Edenderry, County Offaly, Ireland

Sport
- Football Position: Left wing-forward
- Hurling Position: Left wing-forward
Club
- Years: Club
- 1995-present: Edenderry
Club titles
	Football	Hurling
Offaly titles	4	0
Inter-county
Years	County	Apps (scores)
2000-2004 1997-2001	Offaly (F); Offaly (H)	0 (0-0); 8 (1-6)
Inter-county titles
	Football	Hurling
Leinster Titles	0	0
All-Ireland Titles	0	1 (as sub)
League titles	0	0
All-Stars	0	0

Cillian Farrell (born 1977) is an Irish hurling manager and former dual player. He is the former manager of the Meath senior hurling team.

A dual player at the highest levels, Farrell had a successful playing career at club level with Edenderry and at inter-county levels with Offaly. He was a fringe member of the inter-county hurling team during the 'golden age' of the 1990s and collected an All-Ireland title as a substitute in 1998.

Shortly after his inter-county retirement, Farrell became involved in team management and coaching. He took charge of the Na Fianna hurling team in Meath for three years and restored some pride to the perennial relegation candidates. Farrell was appointed manager of the Meath senior hurling team in October 2010. He stepped down from the position on 2 June 2013 after a 0-23 to 1-10 defeat to Down, however, he returned to the position later that year.

Sporting positions
Preceded by T. J. Reilly	Meath Senior Hurling Manager; 2010–2014	Succeeded by Martin Ennis
