= Liam Hogan (hurler) =

Irish hurler

Personal information
- Native name: Liam Ó hÓgáin (Irish)
- Born: 10 March 1939 Bruree, County Limerick, Ireland
- Died: 15 January 2014 (aged 74) Bruree, County Limerick, Ireland
- Occupation: Builder

Sport
- Sport: Hurling
- Position: Right wing-forward
Club
- Years: Club
- Bruree
Club titles
- Limerick titles: 0
Inter-county*
| Years | County | Apps (scores) |
| 1958-1963 | Limerick | 9 (1-7) |
Inter-county titles
- Munster titles: 0
- All-Irelands: 0
- NHL: 0
- *Inter County team apps and scores correct as of 23:13, 6 February 2014.

Liam Hogan (10 March 1939 – 15 January 2014) was an Irish hurler who played as a right wing-forward for the Limerick senior team.

Born in Bruree, County Limerick, Hogan first played competitive hurling whilst at school at Charleville CBS. He arrived on the inter-county scene at the age of eighteen when he first linked up with the Limerick minor team, before later joining the junior side. He made his senior debut in the 1958 championship. Hogan went on to play a key part for Limerick for over the next few years, however, he enjoyed little success in terms of silverware.

As a member of the Munster inter-provincial team for one season, Hogan won one Railway Cup medal as a non-playing substitute in 1963. At club level played with Bruree.

Throughout his career Hogan made nine championship appearances. A serious eye injury brought an end to his career during the 1963 championship.

== Honours ==
=== Team ===
Munster

- Railway Cup (1): 1961 (sub)
