= Kehoe Cup =

Hurling competition in Ireland

- Current season or competition: 2026 Kehoe Cup
- Irish: Corn Mhic Eochaidh
- Code: Hurling
- Founded: 1977
- Region: Leinster and Ulster (GAA)
- Trophy: Kehoe Cup
- No. of teams: 3 (2026)
- Title holders: Wicklow (7th title)
- Most titles: Westmeath (9 titles)
- Sponsors: Dioralyte
- Motto: Commitment, Community, Respect
- Official website: https://leinstergaa.ie/competitions/dioralyte-kehoe-cup-2026/

The Kehoe Cup (/kjoʊ/ KYOH; Irish: Corn Mhic Eochaidh) is an annual hurling competition organised by the Leinster Council of the Gaelic Athletic Association (GAA) since 1977 for second- and third-tier inter-county teams in the province of Leinster in Ireland. Nowadays, teams from the provinces of Ulster and Connacht are eligible to compete; formerly, teams from third-level institutions within the three provinces also did. The competition runs each January. Formerly sponsored by Bord na Móna, it was formerly known as the "Bord na Móna Kehoe Cup" and is now the "Dioralyte Kehoe Cup" since Dioralyte took over as main sponsor in 2024.

The Kehoe Cup is part of a series of GAA tournaments known as the Leinster GAA Series, along with the Walsh Cup and the O'Byrne Cup. The original purpose of these competitions was to raise funds to supplement an injury scheme for the players. Nowadays, the funds generated are used to alleviate hardship among players, mentors and families who are in financial difficulty. The funds are administered throughout the twelve counties of Leinster. Apart from this, the competitions provide an opportunity for the county teams to select their panel for the year and prepare for the National Hurling League (NHL).

Since the inception of the Kehoe Cup in 1977, a total of 14 teams have won the tournament. Westmeath is the most successful team with 9 titles.

== History ==
In 1954, the Leinster Council established a new inter-county tournament in an effort to raise funds to supplement the medical bills of players who were in financial difficulty. This scheme, known as the Players' Injury Fund, was the first of its kind to be offered by a provincial GAA council. Originally known as the Leinster Accident Fund Tournament, it started as a knockout competition for the 12 counties in Leinster. During the fifties and sixties, the hurling tournament, which became known as the Walsh Cup, was dominated by the stronger hurling counties of Kilkenny and Wexford. As a result of this, the Walsh Cup was not contested for much of the seventies. In 1977, a second cup was presented to the Leinster Council for an alternative hurling competition. The cup was dedicated to former GAA President, Michael Kehoe (Wexford), who died on 8 January 1977. The tournament thus became known as the Kehoe Cup. The Leinster Council decided to alternate it with the Walsh Cup between the stronger and developing counties for the Players' Injury Fund. In its inaugural year, it was contested by the stronger hurling counties and was won by Wexford who beat Kilkenny in the final by 2–13 to 1–15 on 21 August 1977 in Enniscorthy, County Wexford. There was a break in the Walsh Cup from 1983 to 1986. When it recommenced in 1987, it was decided by the Leinster Council that the Walsh Cup would be used exclusively for the stronger hurling counties and the Kehoe Cup for the developing counties.

== Format ==
The Kehoe Cup was historically straight knockout tournament with each match played as a single leg. The pairings are drawn at random without seeding and the draw usually takes place in November or December of the previous year. The sixteen teams that are drawn to compete in the first round. The eight winning teams from the first round progress to the quarter-finals while the losing teams are drawn against each other to compete for the Kehoe Shield. If a match ended in a draw, it was settled in extra time. However, if the score remains level at the end of extra time, a replay takes place and so on until a winner is found.

The format of the competition remained virtually unchanged since its inception in 1977 until 2015. The most significant change to the tournament was the entry of teams from outside of Leinster. Many of the second- and third-tier inter-county teams in Connacht and Ulster later competed in the Kehoe Cup. Another change to the competition was the entry of teams from third-level institutions. Colleges situated within any of the three provinces were eligible to compete in the Kehoe Cup.

From 2015 to 2018 the tournament was restricted to Leinster county and college teams, and was run on group system, with group winners playing in the final.

Since 2019, only county teams from Leinster and Ulster compete, with no third-level sides. The format and number of teams vary each year. Since 2022, the tournament has been a round robin, with no final match.

== Sponsorship ==
In December 2011, the Leinster Council announced a new partnership with Bord na Móna which would provide the competition with a sponsor for the first time in its then 34-year history. This three-year sponsorship deal began in January 2012 and helps fund what is now known as the Bord na Móna Leinster GAA Series, which includes the Kehoe Cup and Shield, Walsh Cup and Shield, and the O'Byrne Cup and Shield. The sponsorship also helps to finance the Leinster GAA's hardship fund, which is the only one of its kind offered by a provincial GAA council and has been in existence since 1954. In the past, this fund has helped local communities, families and players to finance medical bills, rebuild homes lost through tragic circumstances and made financial payments to assist disabled players.

== Roll of honour ==
=== By county ===
#	Team	Titles	Runners-up	Years won	Years runners-up
1	Westmeath	9	2	1978, 1983, 1994, 1995, 2000, 2009, 2010, 2019, 2022	1998, 2002
2	Meath	8	6	1993, 1996, 1998, 2004, 2008, 2011, 2014, 2015	1981, 1986, 1987, 1988, 1989, 1990, 2013
3	Wicklow	7	9	1989, 1991, 1998, 2001, 2002, 2003, 2026	1993, 1995, 1996, 1997, 1999, 2004, 2011, 2015, 2018
4	Carlow	6	8	1986, 1990, 1992, 1999, 2005, 2006	1991, 1994, 2000, 2007, 2008, 2009, 2022, 2023
5	Kildare	4	4	2013, 2016, 2023, 2024	1992, 2001, 2010, 2014
6	London	2	2	1987, 1988	1983, 2003
7	Dublin	1	2	1981	1978, 1982
7	DIT	1	1	2007	2006
7	Maynooth University	1	1	2017	2016
7	Wexford	1	0	1977	—
7	Laois	1	0	1982	—
7	GMIT	1	0	2012	—
7	Longford	1	0	2018	—
7	Offaly	1	0	2020	—
15	Antrim	0	2	—	2019, 2020
15	Down	0	2	—	2024, 2026
15	St Patrick's, Drumcondra	0	1	—	2012

No competition in 1979, 1984, 1985 or 2021. Kilkenny and Wexford qualified for the 1980 final, but it was never played.

== List of finals ==
Year	Winners		Runners-up		Venue
Year	Team	Score	Team	Score	Venue
2026	Wicklow	—	Down	—	no final; round-robin
2025	Not held due to fixture congestion				
2024	Kildare	—	Down	—	no final; round-robin
2023	Kildare	—	Carlow	—	no final; round-robin
2022	Westmeath	—	Carlow	—	no final; round-robin
2020	Not held due to COVID-19 pandemic				
2020	Offaly	1–16 (19)	Antrim	1–15 (18)	Páirc Tailteann
2019	Westmeath	2–20 (26)^{PSO}	Antrim	1–23 (26)	National Games Development Centre, Abbotstown
2018	Longford	0–11 (11)	Wicklow B	0–10 (10)	Pearse Park, Longford
2017	Maynooth University	1–23 (26)	Wicklow	2–11 (17)	Pearse Park, Arklow
2016	Kildare	3–15 (24)	Maynooth University	3-05 (15)	Hawkfield
2015	Meath	0–17 (17)	Wicklow	0-07 (7)	St. Loman's Park
2014	Meath	1–21 (24)	Kildare	0–19 (19)	St Conleth's Park
2013	Kildare	2–11 (17)	Meath	0–13 (13)	St. Loman's Park
2012	GMIT	2–18 (24)	St Pat's, Drumcondra	1–13 (16)	Na Fianna GAA
2011	Meath	0–16 (16)	Wicklow	1–11 (14)	Pearse Park (Arklow)
2010	Westmeath	1–15 (18)	Kildare	1–11 (14)	St Conleth's Park
2009	Westmeath	0–16 (16)	Carlow	0-09 (9)	Kinnegad
2008	Meath	1–20 (23)	Carlow	0–17 (17)	O'Moore Park
2007	DIT	1–10 (13)	Carlow	1-07 (10)	Dr. Cullen Park

== Kehoe Cup Shield ==
The Kehoe Cup Shield (Irish: Sciath Chorn Mhic Eochaidh) was a competition between the teams that lose in the first round of the Kehoe Cup. The competition was first held in 2009 when Kildare beat Louth in the final by 4–16 to 1–02.

The 2011 tournament was won by TCD who beat Louth in the final by 1–21 to 2–14.

It was revived in 2019 as a separate tournament.

=== Roll of honour ===
#	Team	Titles	Runners-up	Years won	Years runners-up
1	Wicklow	2	0	2010, 2022	—
2	Louth	1	3	2019	2009, 2011, 2022
2	Kildare	1	0	2009	—
2	TCD	1	0	2011	—
2	Fingal	1	0	2012	—
6	Armagh	0	2	—	2010, 2012
6	DCU St Patrick's Campus	0	1	—	2019

=== List of finals ===
Year	Winners		Runners-up		Venue
Year	County	Score	County	Score	Venue
2023–	No competition				
2022	Wicklow	—	Louth	—	no final; round-robin
2020–2021	No competition due to COVID-19				
2019	Louth	1–18 (21)	DCU St Patrick's Campus	0–14 (14)	Darver
2015–18	No competition				
2014	Mayo	1–17 (20)	Queen's University Belfast	0–15 (15)	Darver
2013	Down	0–19 (19)	Roscommon	1–14 (17)	St. Loman's, Mullingar
2012	Fingal	4–11 (23)	Armagh	1–14 (17)	Lawless Memorial Park
2011^{AET}	TCD	1–21 (24)	Louth	2–14 (20)	Darver
2010	Wicklow	3–12 (21)	Armagh	1–17 (20)	Arklow
2009	Kildare	4–16 (28)	Louth	1-02 (5)	Darver

^{AET}: Abandoned in extra time.

== See also ==
- Connacht Senior Hurling League
- Leinster Senior Hurling League (Walsh Cup)
- Munster Senior Hurling League
- Ulster Senior Hurling League (Conor McGurk Cup)
