= Kildare county hurling team =

Hurling team

Kildare
- Sport: Hurling
- Irish: Cill Dara
- Nickname(s): The Lilywhites
- County board: Kildare GAA
- Manager: Brian Dowling
- Captain: Rian Boran
- Home venue(s): St Conleth's Park, Newbridge

Recent competitive record
- Last championship title: 2025 Joe McDonagh Cup
- Current NHL Division: 1B (4th in 2026)
First colours	Second colours

The Kildare county hurling team represents Kildare in hurling and is governed by Kildare GAA, the county board of the Gaelic Athletic Association. The team competes in the Joe McDonagh Cup and the National Hurling League.

Kildare's home ground is St Conleth's Park, Newbridge. The team's manager is Brian Dowling.

The team has never won the Leinster Senior Championship, the All-Ireland Senior Championship or the National League.

Kildare enjoyed one of the strongest periods in its hurling history during the 1960s and 1970s. The county won the All-Ireland Junior Championship in 1962 and 1966, followed by the All-Ireland Intermediate Championship in 1969. In 1976, Kildare came within minutes of reaching the Leinster Senior Hurling Championship (SHC) final, holding a four-point lead over eventual All-Ireland finalists Wexford before being overtaken in the closing stages of the semi-final. That performance earned Johnny Walsh a replacement All Star award.

During the same era, Kildare established itself as a competitive side against some of the country's strongest counties. The team recorded successive National League victories over Waterford, were level with Tipperary at half-time in the 1971 National League quarter-final, and reached the 1976 championship quarter-final, where Tipperary prevailed by six points. Kildare also came close to reaching the top tier of the National Hurling League, losing a Division 1B promotion play-off to Clare in 1971 after surrendering a four-point lead in the closing ten minutes, before suffering another promotion play-off defeat to Waterford in 1974.

The county later won four All-Ireland Senior B Championships, the last coming in 2004, before becoming a regular contender in the Christy Ring Cup. Kildare reached the 2007 final, losing to Westmeath, before claiming the title for the first time in 2014 with a 4–18 to 2–22 victory over Kerry.

Kildare added further Christy Ring Cup titles in 2018 and 2020. The 2020 success came under manager David Herity, the former Kilkenny goalkeeper.

In 2025, Kildare enjoyed its best Joe McDonagh Cup campaign to date. Victories over Carlow, Laois and Down secured a place in the 2025 Joe McDonagh Cup final against Laois.. Kildare went on to defeat Laois 2–26 to 1–19 in the final to claim their first Joe McDonagh Cup title. The victory secured promotion to the Leinster Senior Hurling Championship and the All-Ireland Senior Hurling Championship for the 2026 season, marking the county's return to the top tier of championship hurling for the first time since 2004.

== Panel ==
Recent players include:

- Jack Sheridan

== Management team ==
Appointed September 2023

- Manager: Brian Dowling

== Managerial history ==
Morgan Lalor 2001–2005

Ben Dorney Cork 2005–2007

Andy Comerford Kilkenny 2007–2010

Michael O'Riordan 2010–2011

Willie Sutherland Wexford 2011–2013

Brian Lawlor Tipperary 2013–2015

Joe Quaid Limerick 2015–2018

David Herity Kilkenny 2018–2023

Brian Dowling Kilkenny 2023–

== Players ==
=== Captaincy ===
- Martin Fitzgerald: 2019
- James Burke 2023
- Paddy McKenna 2024
- Rian Boran 2025

=== Team of the Millennium ===
Jimmy Curran (Castledermot), Tommy Burke (Naomh Bríd), Richard Cullen (Ardclough), Seamus Malone (Coill Dubh), Tommy Christian (Ardclough), Pat Dunny (Éire Og), Tony Carew (Coill Dubh), Bobby Burke (Ardclough), Jack O'Connell (Naomh Bríd), Johnny Walsh (Ardclough), Tommy Carew (Coill Dubh), Pat White (Naomh Bríd), Mick Dwane (Ardclough), Mick Moore (Broadford), Mick Mullins (Éire Og).

== Honours ==
=== All-Ireland titles ===
- All-Ireland Senior Hurling Championship
  - Quarter-finalists (1): 1989
- All-Ireland Senior B Hurling Championship
  - (gold) Winners (4): 1974, 1980, 1989, 2004
  - (silver) Runners-up (1): 1990
- All-Ireland Intermediate Hurling Championship
  - (gold) Winners (1): 1969
- All-Ireland Junior Hurling Championship
  - (gold) Winners (2): 1962, 1966
- Joe McDonagh Cup
  - (gold) Winners (1): 2025
- Christy Ring Cup
  - (gold) Winners (5): 2014, 2018, 2020, 2022, 2024
  - (silver) Runners-up (1): 2007
- All-Ireland Under-16 B Hurling Championship
  - (gold) Winners (2): 1991, 2002

=== League titles ===
- National Hurling League
  - Quarter-finalists (3): 1971, 1974, 1975
- National Hurling League Division 2A
  - Finalist (1): 2023
- National Hurling League Division 2B
  - (gold) Winners (2): 2012, 2015
- National Hurling League Division 3A
  - (gold) Winners (1): 2009

=== Provincial titles ===
- Leinster Senior Hurling Championship
  - (bronze) Semi-finalists (2): 1976, 1977
- Kehoe Cup
  - (gold) Winners (3): 2013, 2016, 2023
  - (silver) Runners-up (4): 1992, 2001, 2010, 2014
- Kehoe Shield
  - (gold) Winners (1): 2009
- Leinster Intermediate Hurling Championship
  - (gold) Winners (1): 1969
  - (silver) Runners-up (1): 1967
- Leinster Junior Hurling Championship
  - (gold) Winners (5): 1905, 1906, 1934, 1962, 1966
  - (silver) Runners-up (9): 1914, 1932, 1964, 1965, 1968, 1969, 1971, 1972, 2002
- Leinster Under-21 B Hurling Championship
  - (gold) Winners (3): 2007, 2012, 2013
