= Fingal county hurling team =

Hurling team in County Dublin, Ireland

Fingal
- Sport: Hurling
- Irish: Fine Gall
- Nickname(s): The Ravens; The Northsiders
- Home venue(s): Lawless Memorial Park, Swords

Recent competitive record
- Current All-Ireland status: Defunct
- Last championship title: None
- Current NFL Division: Defunct
- Last league title: None
First colours

The Fingal hurling team (Irish: Foireann Iománaíochta Fhine Ghaill) is an inter-county hurling team representing Fingal in the Kehoe Cup, the National Hurling League and the Nicky Rackard Cup. It is organised by the Dublin GAA and was established in 2008. Fingal are currently managed by Mick Kennedy of the Fingallians club.

The Fingal team is made up of players from Dublin clubs within the Fingal region. While players from Fingal are eligible to play for the Dublin county team, players from outside of Fingal are not eligible to play for the Fingal county team. The Fingal catchment area stretches from Blanchardstown to Balbriggan and contains a total of 16 clubs; these include Castleknock, Erin go Bragh, Fingallians, Naomh Barróg, Naomh Mearnóg, O'Dwyers, Setanta, Skerries Harps, St Brigid's, St Finian's (Swords), St Maurs, St Pats Donabate, St Peregrines, St Sylvester's, Trinity Gaels and Wild Geese.

== History ==
The Fingal hurling team which played in the 2008 Nicky Rackard Cup semi-final.

In 2007, the GAA announced that hurling teams from Fingal and "South Down" (i.e. excluding the Ards peninsula) would compete at inter-county level in parallel to the main Dublin and Down hurling teams, to encourage hurling in these areas where the game had not been strong. In 2008, Fingal entered the Kehoe Cup which is a pre-season tournament for second and third-tier inter-county and third-level hurling teams. Fingal won their debut match against IT Tallaght by 3–12 to 1–11 to qualify for the quarter-final stages. Their next match was drawn against Carlow whom they lost to by 1–13 to 1–10. Later that year, both Fingal and South Down were entered into the Nicky Rackard Cup, a competition for the third-tier hurling teams of the All-Ireland Senior Hurling Championship. Fingal qualified for the semi-finals after finishing top of their group and beating Leitrim in the quarter-finals by 1–19 to 0–12. However, Fingal lost the semi-final to Sligo by 1–16 to 0–11, who later went on to win the competition.

Fingal claimed their first piece of silverware in 2012 when they won the Kehoe Cup Shield, beating Armagh in the final by 4–11 to 1–14. They topped off the year by winning division 3A of the National Hurling League after Monaghan refused to play in the final.

However, in 2013 they won the National Hurling League Division 3A Final and a season later reached the final of the Nicky Rackard Cup where they eventually lost to Tyrone.

The Fingal hurling project was eventually disbanded in 2016.

== Sponsorship ==
In April 2012, the Dublin County Board announced a new partnership with Dublin Airport Authority (DAA) which would provide the Fingal team with a sponsor for the first time in its 5-year history. The DAA had previously supported local GAA clubs in the Fingal area including St Margarets, Naomh Mearnóg and St Sylvesters.

== Management team ==
- Manager: Mick Kennedy (Fingallians)
- Selectors: Sean McGarry (Skerries Harps), Des Foley (St Vincents), Liam Mac Cuirc (Setanta)

=== Managerial history ===
Years	Name	Club	Kehoe Cup titles	National League titles	Nicky Rackard titles
2008–2010	Denis Murphy	Skerries Harps			
2011	Ben Dorney	St Vincents			
2012	Willie Burke	St Brigid's	2012 (Shield)	2012 (Div. 3A)	
2013–2016	Mick Kennedy	Fingallians		2013 (Div. 3A)	

== Honours ==
Senior

- National Hurling League Division 3A: 2
  - 2012, 2013
- Kehoe Cup Shield: 1
  - 2012

Minor

- All-Ireland Minor 'C' Hurling Championships: 1
  - 2012
