= Down county hurling team =

Hurling team

Down
- Sport: Hurling
- Irish: An Dún
- Nickname(s): The Mournemen
- County board: Down GAA
- Home venue(s): Páirc Esler, Newry

Recent competitive record
- Last championship title: 2022
| First colours | Second colours |

The Down county hurling team represents Down GAA, the county board of the Gaelic Athletic Association, in the Gaelic sport of hurling. The team competes in the Joe McDonagh Cup and the National Hurling League.

Down's home ground is Páirc Esler, Newry. The team's manager is Ronan Sheehan (dual player).

The team last won the Ulster Senior Championship in 1997, but has never won the All-Ireland Senior Championship or the National League.

== History ==
Down played in the Leinster Minor Hurling Championship for three years in the 1970s, even playing Antrim in an unusual Leinster semi-final at Croke Park in 1979.

Although Down had not won the All-Ireland B championship in four final appearances, when the Ulster Senior Hurling Championship was revived, Down won titles in 1992, 1995 and 1997, losing the All-Ireland semi-finals by 14, 11 and 16 points.

Down defeated Kilkenny in a Division 1 match in 1993 by a scoreline of 1–12 to 1–11.

Down hurlers won the Christy Ring Cup for the first time in 2013, their greatest All-Ireland level success to date. This entitled them to enter the 2014 All-Ireland Senior Hurling Championship; however, Down opted to remain in the 2nd on this occasion.

In 2020, Down caused an upset in the Christy Ring Cup by knocking Offaly out in the semi-final. The team did so in a first ever inter-county hurling penalty shootout. The final against Kildare was scheduled for the one hundredth anniversary of Bloody Sunday, with promotion to the 2021 Joe McDonagh Cup achieved by both finalists.

== South Down ==
In 2007, the GAA announced that a hurling team from "South Down" (i.e. excluding the Ards peninsula) would compete in parallel to the main Down team, to encourage hurling in an area of growing population where the game had not been strong. While players from all of Down were eligible for the main Down team, Ards players could not play for South Down. The new team competed in the 2008 National Hurling League, recording their first win by beating Cavan at Ballela, scoring 4–15 to Cavan's 0–9. South Down then competed in the 2008 Nicky Rackard Cup and in the Lory Meagher Cup until 2011.

== Managerial history ==
- c. 2009: Jim McKernan

== Players ==
=== Awards ===
- All Stars:

Down has 1 All Star. 1992: Gerard McGrattan

- Champion 15:

Down has 29, as of 2024. 17 different players have won, as of 2024. 2005: Gareth Johnson, Martin Coulter
2007: Graham Clarke
2009: Fintan Conway, Sean Ennis, Ruairi McGrattan
2010: Paul Braniff
2011: Paul Braniff^{2nd}
2012: Paul Braniff^{3rd}
2013: Paul Braniff^{4th}, Gareth Johnson^{2nd}, Conor Woods, Patrick Hughes
2014: Conor Woods^{2nd}
2015: Danny Toner, Fintan Conway^{2nd}
2016: John McManus, Caolan Taggart
2017: Michael Hughes, Eoghan Sands
2018: Daithí Sands
2019: Caolan Taggart^{2nd}, Daithí Sands^{2nd}
2020: Stephen Keith, Caolan Taggart^{3rd}
2021: Stephen Keith^{2nd}, Conor Woods^{3rd}
2023: Pearse Óg McCrickard
2024: Daithí Sands^{3rd}

- Ulster GAA President’s Awards Hurler of the Year:

2025: Matthew Conlan (hurler)

== Honours ==
Official honours, with additions noted.

=== National ===
- All-Ireland Senior Hurling Championship
  - (bronze) Semi-finalists (2): 1992, 1995
  - Quarter-finalists (1): 1997
- All-Ireland Senior B Hurling Championship/Joe McDonagh Cup
  - (silver) Runners-up (6): 1988
- All-Ireland Intermediate Hurling Championship/Christy Ring Cup
  - (gold) Winners (1): 2013
  - (silver) Runners-up (4): 2005, 2009, 2019, 2020
- All-Ireland Junior Hurling Championship/Nicky Rackard Cup
  - (gold) Winners (1): 1964
  - (silver) Runners-up (1): 2004
- National Hurling League Division 2
  - (gold) Winners (2): 2004, 2025
- National Hurling League Division 2B
  - (gold) Winners (1): 2020

=== Provincial ===
- Ulster Senior Hurling Championship
  - (gold) Winners (4): 1941, 1992, 1995, 1997
  - (silver) Runners-up (19): 1930, 1939, 1940, 1989, 1990, 1991, 1993, 1994, 1996, 2001, 2002, 2004, 2005, 2007, 2008, 2009, 2010, 2013, 2015
- Ulster Intermediate Hurling Championship
  - (gold) Winners (4): 1968, 1971, 1972, 1998
- Ulster Junior Hurling Championship
  - (gold) Winners (7): 1956, 1960, 1962, 1964, 1967, 1992, 1993
- Ulster Under-21 Hurling Championship
  - (gold) Winners (11): 1969, 1971, 1975, 1977, 1983, 1984, 1985, 1987, 1990, 2003, 2004
- Ulster Minor Hurling Championship
  - (gold) Winners (13): 1930, 1932, 1934, 1957, 1971, 1972, 1976, 1978, 1984, 1985, 1989, 1994, 2012
- Conor McGurk Cup
  - (gold) Winners (2): 2019, 2022
  - (silver) Runners-up (3): 2018, 2020, 2021
