= Wicklow county hurling team =

Hurling team

Wicklow
- Sport: Hurling
- Irish: Cill Mhantáin
- Nickname(s): The Garden County
- County board: Wicklow GAA
- Manager: Jonathan O'Neill
- Home venue(s): Echelon Park

Recent competitive record
- Last championship title: None
- Current NHL Division: 3 (3rd in 2025)
- Last league title: None
| First colours | Second colours |

The Wicklow county hurling team represents Wicklow in hurling and is governed by Wicklow GAA, the county board of the Gaelic Athletic Association. The team competes in the Christy Ring Cup and the National Hurling League.

Wicklow's home ground is Echelon Park, Aughrim. The team's manager is Jonathan O'Neill.

The team has never won the Leinster Senior Championship, the All-Ireland Senior Championship or the National League.

== History ==
Wicklow won the All-Ireland Junior Hurling Championship in 1967 and 1971.

Wicklow won the Kehoe Cup on seven occasions: in 1989, 1991, 1998, 2000, 2001, 2002 and 2003.

== Panel ==
| No. | Player | Position | Club |
|---|---|---|---|
| 1 | Conor McNally | Goalkeeper | Bray Emmets |
| 2 | Tommy Collins | Right corner-back | Carnew Emmets |
| 3 | John Henderson | Full-back | Bray Emmets |
| 4 | Rian Waters | Left corner-back | Donard the Glen |
| 5 | Jack Doyle | Left half-forward | Carnew Emmetts |
| 6 | Padraig Doran | Centre-back | Carnew Emmets |
| 7 | Sam O'Dowd | Left half-back | Glenealy |
| 8 | John Toomey | Midfield | Ballincor |
| 9 | | Midfield | Kilcoole |
| 10 | | Right half-forward | Bray Emmets |
| 11 | | Centre-forward | Bray Emmets |
| 12 | | Left half-forward | Glenealy |
| 13 | | Right corner-forward | St Patrick's |
| 14 | | Full-forward | Glenealy |
| 15 | | Left corner-forward | Glenealy |

^{INJ} Player has had an injury which has affected recent involvement with the county team.
^{RET} Player has since retired from the county team.
^{WD} Player has since withdrawn from the county team due to a non-injury issue.

== Management team ==
Appointed January 2024:

- Manager: Jonathan O'Neill

== Managerial history ==
Efforts to find a manager to replace Michael Neary led the Wicklow County Board to advertise the position in the national media in early 2005.

Michael Neary Dublin 2000–2004

Willie Carley Wexford 2005–2006

Michael Neary^{i} Dublin 2006

Brendan Cuddihy 2006

John Mitchell 2006–2008

Michael Phelan 2009

Casey O'Brien 2009–2015

Martin Storey Wexford 2015–2016

Séamus Murphy Wexford 2016–2018

Éamonn Scallan Wexford 2018–2022

Casey O'Brien Wicklow 2022–2024

Jonathan O'Neill Wicklow 2024–

== Players ==
=== Awards ===
- Champion 15:

Wicklow has 24, as of 2025. 16 different players have won, as of 2025. 2005: Joe Murphy
2007: Don Hyland
2008: Jonathan O'Neill
2009: Jeffrey Bermingham
2010: Andy O'Brien, Jonathan O'Neill^{2nd}
2011: Andy O'Brien^{2nd}
2012: Eamonn Kearns, Jonathan O'Neill^{3rd}, Ronan Keddy
2013: Liam Kennedy
2014: Stephen Kelly
2015: B Cuddihy
2016: Luke Maloney
2017: Eamonn Kearns^{2nd}, Andy O'Brien^{3rd}
2018: John Henderson, Warren Kavanagh
2019: John Henderson^{2nd}
2020: Christy Moorehouse
2023: Andrew Kavanagh, Christy Moorehouse^{2nd}, Andy O'Brien^{4th}
2025: Pádraig Doyle

== Crest and colours ==
Wicklow's traditional team colours are royal blue and gold. The kits are usually blue shirts, white shorts and blue socks with a gold trim. Wicklow's alternative jersey is white with blue shorts and blue socks.

The Wicklow crest features the roundtower of Glendalough in the foreground surrounded by a large 'W' standing for the name of the county. In the background of the crest is a green mountain, representing the Wicklow Mountains and below is a hand holding a Gaelic football and a hurley and sliotar.

=== Team sponsorship ===
W H Scott Lifting became Wicklow's Hurling shirt sponsor ahead of the 2017 season.

| Manufacturer | Shirt sponsor | |
| Manufacturer | Years | Sponsor |
|---|---|---|
O'Neills
| O'Neills | 1999–2003 | Wicklow GoI |
| O'Neills | 2004–2005 | White Young Green |
| O'Neills | 2006–2009 | Ballymore Group |
| O'Neills | 2010–2013 | Brennan Hotels |
| O'Neills | 2014–2016 | Arklow Bay Hotel |
| O'Neills | 2016– 2018 | W H Scott Lifting |
| O'Neills | 2019– | YUASA |

== Honours ==
=== National ===
- All-Ireland Senior B Hurling Championship
  - (gold) Winners (1): 2003
  - (silver) Runners-up (2): 1995, 2002
- All-Ireland Intermediate Hurling Championship
  - (silver) Runners-up (1): 1971
- All-Ireland Junior Hurling Championship
  - (gold) Winners (2): 1967, 1971
- Christy Ring Cup
  - (silver) Runners-up (2): 2011, 2012
- Nicky Rackard Cup
  - (gold) Winners (3): 2023
- National Hurling League Division 2B
  - (gold) Winners (2): 2014, 2019
- National Hurling League Division 3
  - (gold) Winners (1):2026
- National Hurling League Division 3A
  - (gold) Winners (1): 2011
- National Hurling League Division 3B
  - (gold) Winners (1): 2010
- All-Ireland Under 21 B Hurling Championship
  - (gold) Winners (1): 2015

=== Provincial ===
- Kehoe Cup
  - (gold) Winners (7): 1989, 1991, 1998, 2000, 2001, 2002, 2003
- Kehoe Shield
  - (gold) Winners (1): 2022
- Leinster Intermediate Hurling Championship
  - (gold) Winners (1): 1971
- Leinster Junior Hurling Championship
  - (gold) Winners (5): 1954, 1964, 1965, 1967, 1971
