= 2013 Christy Ring Cup final =

Hurling decider

- Event: 2013 Christy Ring Cup
Down	Kerry
3–16	2–17
- Date: 8 June 2013
- Venue: Croke Park, Dublin
- Referee: Christopher Browne (Galway)

The 2013 Christy Ring Cup final was a hurling match played at Croke Park on 8 June 2013 to determine the winners of the 2013 Christy Ring Cup, the 9th season of the Christy Ring Cup, a tournament organised by the Gaelic Athletic Association for the second tier hurling teams. The final was contested by Kerry of Munster and Down of Ulster, with Down winning by 3–16 to 2–17.

The Christy Ring Cup final between Down and Kerry was the 5th championship meeting between the two teams. Kerry were appearing in their second final in three years and were hoping to win their second cup title. Down were appearing in their third final, having lost the deciders of 2005 and 2009.

A blistering start saw both sides hit the net inside the opening three minutes. First Gareth Johnson drilled home a Down goal before Pádraig Boyle flashed an angle shot to the net at the other end. Kerry took the lead in the 15th minute with a goal from Shane Nolan, who had moments earlier had a point awarded on a Hawk-Eye call. Kerry eased into a five-point lead, but only after a let-off which saw Johnson flash a first-time shot just wide. Down were awarded a penalty in the 29th minute after a run by Michael Ennis was illegally halted, but Paul Braniff drilled over the bar. Down continued to press in the closing stages of the half, cutting the deficit further with three more points.

Kerry still held on to a narrow 2–6 to 1–8 lead at the interval, and they pushed on with three quick points after the restart. Down kept in touch through Conor Woods and in the 48th minute their challenge was given fresh impetus when substitute Scott Nicholson grabbed their second goal. Kerry restored their three points advantage, however, Nicholson continued to make an impact with two more points, and it was another sub, Johnny McCusker, who brought the sides level with four minutes to play. Pádraig Boyle's 70th minute point appeared likely to be the decisive score, however, Braniff gambled with a long punt in the direction of Johnson, who worked his magic with a deft flick that deflected the ball past Bernard Rochford for a two-point win.

Down's Christy Ring Cup victory was their very first. They became the 6th team to win the Christy Ring Cup.

Kerry's Christy Ring Cup defeat was their second having already lost the final in 2010.

== Match ==
=== Details ===
8 June 2013
16:00

Down	3–16 – 2–17	Kerry
G Johnson 2–1, S Nicholson 1–2, P Braniff 0–6 (4f, 1 pen), J Coyle, C Woods (1f, 1 '65') 0–2 each, D Hughes, D Toner, J McCusker 0–1 each.	Report	S Nolan 1–9 (0–5f), P Boyle 1–3, W O'Dwyer 0–2, B O'Leary, A Boyle, G O'Brien 0–1 each.

Croke Park, Dublin
Referee: C Browne (Galway)

Down	Kerry
