= 2014 Christy Ring Cup final =

Hurling decider

- Event: 2014 Christy Ring Cup
Kildare	Kerry
4-18	2-22
- Date: 7 June 2014
- Venue: Croke Park, Dublin
- Referee: Seán Cleere (Kilkenny)

The 2014 Christy Ring Cup final was a hurling match played at Croke Park on 7 June 2014 to determine the winners of the 2014 Christy Ring Cup, the 10th season of the Christy Ring Cup, a tournament organised by the Gaelic Athletic Association for the second tier hurling teams. The final was contested by Kerry of Munster and Kildare of Leinster, with Kildare winning by 4-18 to 2-22.

The Christy Ring Cup final between Kildare and Kerry was the 7th championship meeting between the two teams. Kerry were appearing in their third final in four years and were hoping to win their second cup title having lost the final the previous year. Kildare were appearing in their first final since 2007.

Kerry raced into a 1-5 to 0-2 lead inside the opening 11 minutes as they launched a high tempo challenge. Shane Nolan and Mikey Boyle slotted over points, and goalkeeper Tadhg Flynn sent over a free from 85 metres. In the fifth minute Flynn’s puck-out was gathered by full-forward Pádraig Boyle who flashed the sliotar into the net. Kildare suddenly exploded into action, hitting six points without reply to go level by the 18th minute. In the 27th minute Kildare were awarded a penalty for a foul which goalkeeper Paul Dermody converted. A minute later Kildare struck for a second goal as Gerry Keegan gave Flynn no chance with a searing finish. Kerry responded with a goal of their own as John Doran's long delivery broke to Nolan, who drove a firmly struck shot past Dermody to level the game. A Thomas Casey strike sent Kerry in with a narrow 2-10 to 2-9 advantage at the break.

Sloppy defending allowed Kildare in for a third Kildare goal seven minutes into the second half. Kerry added scores through John Egan and substitute John Griffin, who fired over a couple of long range points. Kildare stunned their opponents with a fourth goal in the 54th minute. Martin Fitzgerald’s shot came back off a post, and Bernard Deay smashed in the rebound to put them back in front, a lead Kildare never lost. Kerry came close to grabbing a goal that would have brought them level five minutes from the end, but Dermody saved. The margin was down to two points after Nolan and Griffin tagged on points, but Kildare held out for the win.

Kildare's Christy Ring Cup victory was their very first. They became the 7th team to win the Christy Ring Cup.

Kerry's Christy Ring Cup defeat was their second in succession and their third over all.

== Match ==
=== Details ===
7 June 2014
16:00

Kildare	4-18 - 2-22	Kerry
G Keegan 1-4, P Divilly 0-7 (5f), B Deay 1-3, R McLoughney 1-2, P Dermody 1-0 (pen), M Fitzgerald 0-2	Report	S Nolan 1-4, P Boyle 1-2, J Egan 0-3 (2f), D Butler 0-3, C Harty 0-3, J Griffin 0-3, T Flynn 0-1 (f), T Casey 0-1, M Boyle 0-1, D Collins 0-1.

Croke Park, Dublin
Referee: S Cleere (Kilkenny)

Kildare	Kerry
