= 2020 Christy Ring Cup final =

Hurling decider

2020 Christy Ring final
- Event: 2020 Christy Ring Cup
Kildare	Down
3–16	0–22
- Date: 22 November 2020
- Venue: Croke Park, Dublin
- Referee: Chris Mooney (Dublin)
- Attendance: 0 (Note: The game was played behind closed doors due to the impact of the COVID-19 pandemic on Gaelic games.)

The 2020 Christy Ring Cup final was played at Croke Park in Dublin on 22 November 2020. It was contested by Kildare and Down.

Kildare won the competition for a second time in three years and third in total.

Down had qualified for the final by causing an upset through knocking Offaly out in the semi-final. The team did so in a first ever inter-county hurling penalty shootout. However, even though Down lost the ultimate game, both finalists were promoted to the 2021 Joe McDonagh Cup.

David Herity was Kildare manager.

== Match details ==
22 November 2020

Kildare	3–16 – 0–22	Down
B Byrne (0-7, 6 frees); J Sheridan (1-4, 3 frees, 1 65); P Divilly (1-1); T Forde (1-0); J Burke (0-2); D Slattery, S Ryan (0-1 each).	Report	O McManus (0-9, 6 frees); P Og McCrickard (0-4, 1 sideline); T Prenter (0-4); P Sheehan (0-2, 1 free); C Woods (0-1, 1 free); D Hughes (0-1); D Sands (0-1).

Croke Park, Dublin
Referee: Chris Mooney (Dublin)

Kildare	Down

?	Mark Doyle
?	Simon Leacy
?	John Doran
?	Cian Shanahan
?	Niall Ó Muineacháin
?	Rian Boran
?	Kevin Whelan
?	Cathal Dowling
?	Paul Divilly
?	Brian Byrne
?	James Burke
?	Conor Dowling
?	Tadhg Forde
?	Jack Sheridan
?	David Slattery
Substitutes:
?	Sean Christanseen for Shanahan (43 mins)
?	Shane Ryan for Conor Dowling (52 mins)
?	Kevin Aherne for Forde (54 mins)
?	Cathal McCabe for Slattery (69 mins)
Manager:
David Herity

?	Stephen Keith
?	Michael Hughes
?	Caolan Taggart
?	Tom Murray
?	Barry Trainor
?	Conor Woods
?	Liam Savage
?	Matt Conlon
?	John McManus
?	Donal Hughes
?	Pearse Og McCrickard
?	Tim Prenter
?	Oisin McManus
?	Eoghan Sands
?	Daithi Sands
Substitutes:
?	Gerard Hughes for Trainor (27 mins)
?	Phelim Savage for M. Hughes (h/t)
?	Chris Egan for D. Hughes (54 mins)
?	Paul Sheehan for McManus (54 mins)
?	Ryan McCusker for McCrickard (67 mins)
Manager:
Ronan Sheehan

Man of the Match:
?
