= 2012 Westmeath Senior Hurling Championship =

Annual hurling competition season

- Champions: Clonkill (13th title); Eoin Price (captain)
- Runners-up: Raharney; Paul Greville (captain)

The 2012 Westmeath Senior Hurling Championship was the 108th staging of the Westmeath Senior Hurling Championship since its establishment by the Westmeath County Board in 1903.

Clonkill were the defending champions.

The final was played on 14 October 2012 at Cusack Park in Mullingar, between [Clonkill and Rahaney, in what was their third meeting in the final overall. Clonkill won the match by 2–16 to 2–11 to claim their 13th championship title overall and a second consecutive title.

== Results ==
=== Final ===
14 October 2012 Final	Clonkill	2-16 - 2-11	Raharney	Cusack Park
