= 2008 Christy Ring Cup final =

Hurling decider

- Event: 2008 Christy Ring Cup
| Carlow | Westmeath |
| 3-22 | 4-16 |
- Date: 3 August 2008
- Venue: O'Connor Park, Tullamore
- Referee: Noel Cosgrove (Tipperary)

The 2008 Christy Ring Cup final was a hurling match played at Croke Park in Dublin, Ireland on 3 August 2008 to determine the winners of the 2008 Christy Ring Cup, the 4th season of the Christy Ring Cup, a tournament organised by the Gaelic Athletic Association for the second tier hurling teams. The final was contested by Carlow of Leinster and Westmeath of Leinster, with Carlow winning by 3-22 to 4-16.

There was nothing to separate the sides in the opening half, with Carlow recovering from an indifferent start to level matters by the break at 1-10 apiece. Derek McNicholas rattled the net for Westmeath while Craig Doyle bagged Carlow's goal.

A scoring blitz on the resumption of play saw Carlow score 2-4 without reply in the first ten minutes. Robert Foley and Doyle found the net as Carlow led by ten points. Westmeath reduced the deficit to just three points with ten minutes remaining, helped by 1-2 from star forward Brendan Murtagh. Carlow edged further in front as full-time approached but in an amazing five minutes of stoppage time Westmeath forced extra-time with a goal from John Shaw and a last gasp converted penalty from Murtagh which ended the contest in normal time at 3-18 to 4-15. A missed penalty for Westmeath in the third minute of extra-time ultimately proved costly. Paul Greville got the only score in the first period with a point for Westmeath, but four unanswered points in the second period from Carlow claim the title.

== Match ==
=== Details ===
3 August 2008

| Carlow | 3-22 - 4-16 | Westmeath |
|---|---|---|
| C Doyle (2-1), C Hughes (0-7, 0-4f), R Foley (1-1), S Kavanagh (0-4, 0-3f), R Dunbar (0-3), M Brennan (0-2), A Gaul (0-1), R Coady (0-1), D Roberts (0-1). | | B Murtagh (2-10, 0-07f), D McNicholas (1-1), J Shaw (1-0), E Price (0-3), S Murphy (0-1), L Smyth (0-1), P Greville (0-1). |

O'Connor Park, Tullamore
Referee: N Cosgrove (Tipperary)

| Carlow | Westmeath |
