= 2009 Christy Ring Cup final =

Hurling decider

- Event: 2010 Christy Ring Cup
| Carlow | Down |
| 1-15 | 0-14 |
- Date: 11 July 2009
- Venue: Croke Park, Dublin
- Referee: Tommy Ryan (Tipperary)
- Attendance: 3,978
- Weather: Heavy rain

The 2009 Christy Ring Cup final was a hurling match played at Croke Park on 11 July 2009 to determine the winners of the 2009 Christy Ring Cup, the 5th season of the Christy Ring Cup, a tournament organised by the Gaelic Athletic Association for the second tier hurling teams. The final was contested by Carlow of Leinster and Down of Ulster, with Carlow winning by 1-15 to 0-14.

The Christy Ring Cup final between Carlow and Down was the third cup meeting between the two teams, with Down recording two victories to Carlow's lone success. Carlow were hoping to make history by becoming the first team to retain the Christy Ring Cup title. Down were appearing in their second cup final and were hoping to claim their first title.

Carlow began in determined fashion when Shane Kavanagh sent over the opening score from a 65'. The early scoring opportunities fell Down's way, with points from Paul Braniff and Simon Wilson ensuring a 0-2 to 0-1 lead to Down by the tenth minute. Carlow scored four of the next five points and lead by 0-05 to 0-03 with 14 minutes to go before the interval. Braniff and Wilson were again on target, with the sides level at 0-5 apiece, seven minutes before the break. The sides traded scores on two occasions before the interval, ensuring a deadlock for half-time at 0-7 apiece.

Braniff and Wilson added early points for Down in the second half before Down defender Seán Ennis denied Kehoe after Carlow had won a penalty in the 43rd minute. Carlow bounced back with a brace of points to level the tie for the sixth time. The sides went point for point between the 46th and 67th minutes, until Carlow's late surge left the outcome of this game beyond doubt. The crucial goal arrived three minutes from time when Andrew Gaule dispatched the ball from 65 metres out into full-forward Robert Foley who powered the ball to the net. Although there were calls from Carlow for a penalty after Foley was swung around in the small square by Down full-back Stephen Murray, the referee applied the advantage rule with Foley turning and planting the ball past goalkeeper Graham Clarke. Craig Doyle added a late point to seal the Carlow victory.

Carlow's victory was their second consecutive success. They became the first team to retain the Christy Ring Cup title.

Down's defeat was their second in a Christy Ring Cup decider. They lost the inaugural final to Westmeath in the 2005 competition.

== Match ==
=== Details ===
11 July 2009

| Carlow | 1-15 - 0-14 | Down |
|---|---|---|
| R Foley 1-03, P Kehoe 0-05 (0-04f), C Doyle 0-02 (0-01f), S Kavanagh (0-01 ‘65’), A Gaule, E Coady, E Byrne, J Coady 0-01 each. | | S Wilson 0-07 (0-07f), P Braniff 0-04, C O'Prey, J Coyle, A Higgins 0-01 each. |

Croke Park, Dublin
Attendance: 3,978
Referee: T Ryan (Tipperary)

| Carlow | Down |
