= 2012 Christy Ring Cup final =

Hurling decider

- Event: 2012 Christy Ring Cup
London	Wicklow
4-18	1-17
- Date: 9 June 2012
- Venue: Croke Park, Dublin
- Referee: Kevin Brady (Louth)

The 2012 Christy Ring Cup final was a hurling match played at Croke Park on 9 June 2012 to determine the winners of the 2012 Christy Ring Cup, the 8th season of the Christy Ring Cup, a tournament organised by the Gaelic Athletic Association for the second tier hurling teams. The final was contested by London of Britain and Wicklow of Leinster, with London winning by 4-18 to 1-17.

The Christy Ring Cup final between London and Wicklow was the second championship meeting between the two teams, with London failing to beat Wicklow in their previous meeting. London were appearing in their first Christy Ring Cup final while Wicklow were appearing in their second consecutive decider after being runners-up to Kerry in 2011.

The teams were level three times early on but when Burgess native Jonathan Maher scored his first goal in the 20th minute, London opened up a five-point lead. It got even better for London two minutes later, when Dromina man, Martin Finn blasted an unstoppable shot to the roof of the net from a 20-metre free. Enan Glynn kept his side in contention with a close range finish for goal in the 24th minuteHard though they tried after the resumption, the Garden County never got closer than four points. What they really needed was a goal but instead, it was London who pounced via Maher’s nonchalant finish that deceived Joe Murphy in the 49th minute.

Wicklow worked hard after the resumption, however, they never got closer than four points. London pounced for their third goal in the 49th minute when Maher’s nonchalant finish deceived Joe Murphy in the goalmouth. O’Neill and Wayne O'Gorman pointed almost immediately to reduce the margin to five once again but Tommy Williams made two outstanding saves, one from O’Neill’s well-struck penalty that bounced up off the turf. Maher bagged his hat-trick in the fourth minute of injury time after a classy interchange between Finn and Kevin Walsh.

London's Christy Ring Cup victory was their first ever. They became the fifth team to win the Christy Ring Cup. They remain the only team to have won the All-Ireland title and the Christy Ring Cup.

Wicklow's Christy Ring Cup defeat was their second in succession. They remain a team who has contested cup finals but has never claimed the ultimate prize.

== Match ==
=== Details ===
9 June 2012

London	4-18 - 1-17	Wicklow
J Maher 3-4, M Finn 1-5f, J Egan 0-4, C Quinn 0-2, P Sloane, K Walsh, T Dunne 0-1 each.		J O'Neill 0-11 (6f, 1 '45'); E Glynn 1-1; E Kearns, A O'Brien 0-2 each; W O'Gorman, E Dunne 0-1 each.

Croke Park, Dublin
Referee: K Brady (Louth)

London	Wicklow
