= 2024 Christy Ring Cup =

Hurling competition

- Dates: 13 April - 2 June 2024
- Teams: 6
- Champions: Kildare (5th title); Paddy McKenna (captain); Brian Dowling (manager)
- Runners-up: Derry; Cormac O'Doherty (captain); Johnny McGarvey (manager)
- Promoted: Kildare
- Relegated: Sligo

Tournament statistics
- Matches played: 16
- Goals scored: 51 (3.19 per match)
- Points scored: 588 (36.75 per match)
- Top scorer(s): Jack Goulding (5-50)

The 2024 Christy Ring Cup was the twentieth edition of the Christy Ring Cup since its establishment by the Gaelic Athletic Association in 2005 and is the third-tier of Hurling for senior county teams (the All-Ireland Senior Hurling Championship is the first-tier trophy). It is contested by six GAA county teams ranked 18–23 in the 2024 All-Ireland Senior Hurling Championship. The competition ran from 13 April to 2 June 2024.

The Christy Ring Cup final was played on 2 June 2024 at Croke Park in Dublin, between Kildare and Derry, in what was their first ever meeting in the final. Kildare won the match by 4-21 to 1-22 to claim their fifth cup title overall and a first title in two years.

London's Jack Goulding was the top scorer with 5-50.

== Team changes ==
=== To Championship ===
Relegated from the Joe McDonagh Cup

- Kildare

Promoted from the Nicky Rackard Cup

- Wicklow

=== From Championship ===
Promoted to the Joe McDonagh Cup

- Meath

Relegated to the Nicky Rackard Cup

- Mayo

== Teams ==
=== General Information ===
| County | Last Cup Title | Last Provincial title | Last All-Ireland title | Position in 2023 Championship | Appearance |
|---|---|---|---|---|---|
| Derry | — | 2001 | — | 2nd | 18th |
| Kildare | 2022 | — | — | 6th (Joe McDonagh Cup) | 18th |
| London | 2012 | — | 1901 | 4th | 12th |
| Sligo | — | — | — | 3rd | 5th |
| Tyrone | — | — | — | 5th | 2nd |
| Wicklow | — | — | — | Champions (Nicky Rackard Cup) | 19th |

=== Personnel and kits ===
| County | Manager | Captain(s) | Sponsor |
|---|---|---|---|
| Derry | Johnny McGarvey | Cormac O'Doherty | Errigal Group |
| Kildare | Brian Dowling | Paddy McKenna | Brady Family |
| London | Neil Rogers | Stephen Frawley; Kevin Reid | Dalata Hotel Group |
| Sligo | Stephen Shiel | | Clayton Hotel Sligo |
| Tyrone | Stephen McGarry | Oran McKee | McAleer & Rushe |
| Wicklow | Jonathan O'Neill | Conor McNally | Yuasa Battery. |

== Group Stage ==
=== Table ===
| Pos | Team | Pld | W | D | L | SF | SA | Diff | Pts | Qualification |
|---|---|---|---|---|---|---|---|---|---|---|
| 1 | Kildare | 5 | 5 | 0 | 0 | 11-116 | 5-65 | +69 | 10 | Advance to Final |
| 2 | Derry | 5 | 4 | 0 | 1 | 8-113 | 4-76 | +49 | 8 | Advance to Final |
| 3 | London | 5 | 3 | 0 | 2 | 13-96 | 6-80 | +37 | 6 | |
| 4 | Tyrone | 5 | 2 | 0 | 3 | 5-78 | 10-110 | -47 | 4 | |
| 5 | Wicklow | 5 | 1 | 0 | 4 | 4-72 | 7-106 | -43 | 2 | |
| 6 | Sligo | 5 | 0 | 0 | 5 | 5-70 | 14-108 | -65 | 0 | Relegated to Nicky Rackard Cup |

=== Round 1 ===
| 13 April 2024 Round 1 | Sligo | 2-08 - 2-19 | Kildare | Markievicz Park |
| | G O’Kelly-Lynch 2-6 (5 frees), R McHugh 0-1, T Cawley 0-1. | Report | J Sheridan 0-7 (4 frees,1’65), C Dowling 2-0; J Burke 0-5, M Curtin 0-2, D Guerin 0-2, S Leacy 0-2, C Boran 0-1. |

| 14 April 2024 Round 1 | Tyrone | 2-12 - 2-23 | London | Donaghmore Road Grounds |
| | A Kelly 1-7 (0-2f, 1-2 ‘65); S Duffin 1-0; B Gormley 0-2; B McGurk, L Devlin & R Weir 0-1 each | Report | J Goulding 0-12 (0-8f, 0-1 ‘65); O Sheil 1-2; S Glynn 0-4; R Crowley 1-0; S Whelan, K Reid, E McHugh & R Lodge 0-1 each |

| 14 April 2024 Round 1 | Wicklow | 0-12 - 0-17 | Derry | Echelon Park Aughrim |
| | L Evans (0-4, 3f), L Maloney (0-2), S Germaine (0-2, 2f), C McNally (0-1, 1f); R McMahon (0-1), D Maloney (0-1), R Waters (0-1). | Report | C O’Doherty (0-9, 6f, 1 65), P Cleary (0-2), C O’Kane (0-1); C O’Reilly (0-1), C Murray (0-1), J Mullan (0-1), S Cassidy (0-1). |

=== Round 2 ===
| 20 April 2024 Round 2 | London | 4-26 - 0-12 | Sligo | McGovern Park |
| | J Goulding 2-13 (0-8f), S Glynn 2-4, R Crowley 0-4, T Millerick 0-2, R Murphy, O Sheil and K Reid 0-1 each. | Report | G O’Kelly Lynch 0-6f, T Cawley and M Munnelly 0-2 each, C Hanniffy and J McHugh 0-1 each. |

| 20 April 2024 Round 2 | Derry | 2-26 - 0-13 | Tyrone | Owenbeg Centre of Excellence |
| | C O'Doherty 0-8, D McGilligan 0-5, C O'Reilly 0-4, D Mooney 1-0, J Mullan 1-0, R Ó Mianáin 0-3, P Cleary 0-2, R Mullan 0-2, S Cassidy 0-2. | Report | A Kelly 0-11, B McGurk 0-1, S Duffin 0-1. |

| 21 April 2024 Round 2 | Kildare | 3-27 - 0-14 | Wicklow | Hawkfield Centre of Excellence |
| | J Sheridan 0-6 (6fs); J Burke 1-4; M Curtin 1-2; D Qualter 0-4; M Delaney 0-3; D Guerin 1-0 C Boran, R Boran 0-2 each; C Kehoe, C McCabe, H Carroll, D Melville 0-1, | Report | I Clancy 0-3 (3fs); R Waters, D Maloney, P Doran (1f) 0-2 each; B Kearney, D Byrne, G Hughes, D Redmond, T Mulconry, J O’Toole (f) 0-1 each |

=== Round 3 ===
| 27 April 2024 Round 3 | Sligo | 2-14 - 2-17 | Tyrone | Markievicz Park |
| | R McHugh 2-2 (1-1pens, 1-0f), 1f), G O’Kelly-Lynch 0-7 (6f), T Cawley and C Hanniffy 0-2 each, J McHugh 0-1. | Report | S Óg Grogan 2-0, A Kelly 0-9 (7f), J McCann 0-3, S Duffin 0-2, B Gormley, T Morgan and M Little 0-1 each. |

| 27 April 2024 Round 3 | London | 2-20 - 0-14 | Wicklow | McGovern Park |
| | J Goulding 0-7 (6f), O Sheil 0-6, K Reid 1-1; R Crowley 1-1, S Glynn 0-2, A Cunney 0-1, T Millerick 0-1, N Broderick 0-1. | Report | S Germaine 0-6 (5f); D Maloney 0-2, L Maloney 0-1; P Doran 0-1, D Redmond 0-1, C Lohan 0-1, C McNally 0-1f; T Mulcrony 0-1. |

| 27 April 2024 Round 3 | Kildare | 2-19 - 0-18 | Derry | Hawkfield Centre of Excellence |
| | J Sheridan 2-7 (5f); C McCabe, S Leacy, M Curtin, D Qualter, C Boran 0-2 each; D Guerin, M Delaney 0-1 each. | Report | C O'Doherty 0-8 (8f); R Ó Mianáin 0-4; M McGrath 0-2; D McGilligan, R Mullan, C O'Kane, C Murray 0-1 each. |

=== Round 4 ===
| 11 May 2024 Round 4 | Tyrone | 0-11 - 2-31 | Kildare | Donaghmore Road Grounds |
| | A Kelly 0-6 (4f, 1 ’65), J McToal 0-4, B McGurk 0-1. | Report | J Sheridan 1-3 (1-0 s/l, 0-2f), J Dolan 1-0, D Qualter 0-11 (7f), Cian Boran 0-6, D Geurin, Conan Boran, D Flaherty, S Leacy 0-2 each, M Delaney, C McCabe, R Boran, D Guerin, C Keogh 0-1 each. |

| 11 May 2024 Round 4 | Derry | 2-22 - 2-13 | London | Owenbeg Centre of Excellence |
| | C O'Doherty 0-7 (4f, 1 '65'), R Ó Mianáin 1-3, C McNaughton 1-1, D McGilligan, C O'Reilly 0-3 each, M McGrath, J Mullan, J Friel, P Cleary and P Kelly 0-1 each. | Report | J Goulding 1-8 (3f, 1 '65'), S Glynn 1-1, D Dawson 0-2, R Crowley and C O'Carroll 0-1 each |

| 12 May 2024 Round 4 | Wicklow | 2-16 - 1-17 | Sligo | Echelon Park Aughrim |
| | S Germaine (5f) 0-6; W Kavanagh, G Hughes 1-1 each; D Maloney 0-3; L Maloney, T Collins, B Ryan, R McMahon 0-1 each. | Report | G O’Kelly-Lynch (5f) 1-8; T Cawley 0-5; F Cawley 0-2; R McHugh (1f), K O’Kennedy 0-1 each. |

=== Round 5 ===
| 18 May 2024 Round 5 | Sligo | 0-19 - 4-30 | Derry | Markievicz Park |
| | G O’Kelly-Lynch (0-11 8f ’65), C Hannify (0-2), T Cawley (0-2), R McHugh, J McHugh, F Cawley, E O’Donoghue (0-1 each). | Report | R Ó’Mianáin (2-3), J Mullane (1-3), C O’Kane (1-0), C O’Doherty (0-7 6f), D McGilligan (0-4), M McGrath (0-2), C O’Reilly (0-2), R Mullan, C McNaughton, C Murray, J Cassidy (0-1) |

| 18 May 2024 Round 5 | London | 3-14 - 2-20 | Kildare | McGovern Park |
| | J Goulding 2-10 (1-5f, 1’65); K Reid 1-1; S Glynn, O Shiel, R Crowley 0-1. | Report | J Sheridan 0-7 (5f, 1’65); D Qualter 1-2; J Dolan 1-0; D Guerin 0-3; C Boran 0-2; R Boran, C McCabe, M Curtin, S Leacy, P Dolan, M Flaherty 0-1. |

| 18 May 2024 Round 5 | Tyrone | 1-25 - 2-16 | Wicklow | Carrickmore Grounds |
| | A Kelly 1-8 (6f, 1'65), J McCann 0-3, L Devlin 0-2, B Gormley 0-2, S Og Grogan 0-2, S Duffin 0-1, T Morgan 0-1, M Little 0-1. | Report | S Germaine 1-7 (1-4f), D Maloney 1-0, R McMahon 0-2, D Redmond 0-2, B Ryan 0-1, G Hughes 0-1, C McNally 0-1 (1f), C Lohan 0-1. |

== Knockout stage ==
=== Final ===
| 2 June 2024 Final | Kildare | 4-21 - 1-22 | Derry | Croke Park |
| | J Sheridan 1-9 (1-0 pen, 8fs), J Burke 1-2, D Qualter 1-1, M Curtin 1-0, C Boran 0-3, S Leacy 0-2, P Dolan 0-1, C Boran 0-1, C McCabe 0-1, D Flaherty 0-1. | Report | C O’Doherty 1-11 (1-0 pen, 9fs), J Mullan 0-6, J Cassidy 0-2, C McNaughton 0-1, D McGilligan 0-1, R Mullan 0-1. |

== Stadia and locations ==
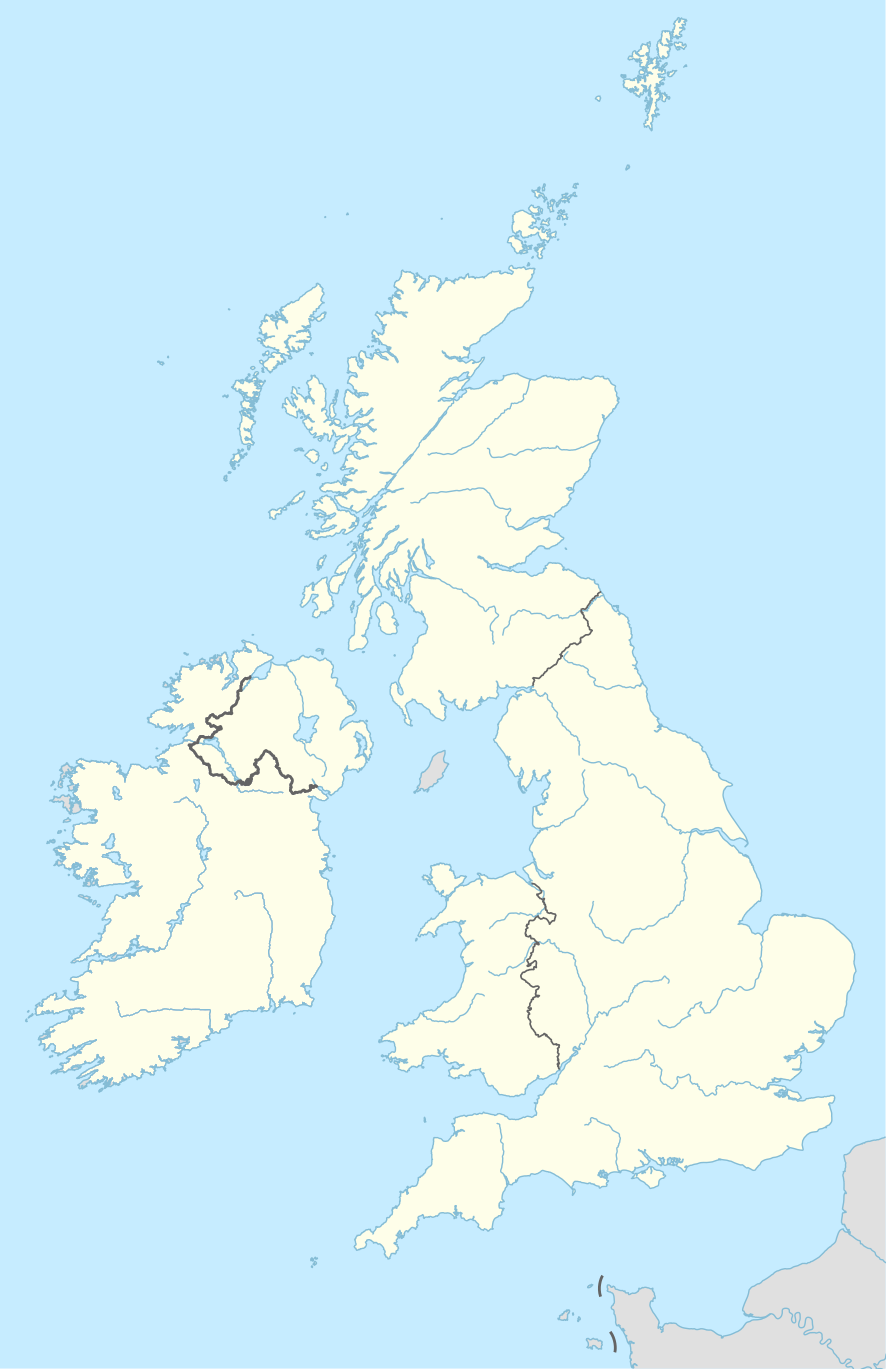
Locations of the 2024 Christy Ring Cup counties.

| County | Location | Province | Stadium | Capacity |
|---|---|---|---|---|
| Derry | Derry | Ulster | Celtic Park | 22,000 |
| Kildare | Newbridge | Leinster | Hawkfield | 8,200 |
| London | South Ruislip | Britain | McGovern Park | 3,000 |
| Sligo | Sligo | Connacht | Markievicz Park | 18,558 |
| Tyrone | Omagh | Ulster | O'Neill's Healy Park | 17,636 |
| Wicklow | Aughrim | Leinster | Echelon Park Aughrim | 7,000 |

== Statistics ==
=== Top scorers ===
Overall

| Rank | Player | County | Tally | Total | Matches | Average |
|---|---|---|---|---|---|---|
| 1 | Jack Goulding | London | 5-50 | 65 | 5 | 13.00 |
| 2 | Cormac O'Doherty | Derry | 1-50 | 53 | 6 | 8.83 |
| 3 | Jack Sheridan | Kildare | 4-39 | 51 | 6 | 8.50 |
| 4 | Gerard O'Kelly-Lynch | Sligo | 3-38 | 47 | 5 | 9.60 |
| 4 | Aidan Kelly | Tyrone | 2-41 | 47 | 5 | 9.60 |
| 6 | David Qualter | Kildare | 2-20 | 26 | 6 | 4.33 |
| 7 | Seánie Germaine | Wicklow | 1-21 | 24 | 4 | 6.00 |
| 8 | Ruairí Ó Mianáin | Derry | 3-13 | 22 | 5 | 4.40 |
| 9 | Seán Glynn | Kildare | 3-12 | 21 | 5 | 4.20 |
| 10 | James Burke | Kildare | 2-11 | 17 | 3 | 5.66 |
| 10 | John Mullan | Derry | 2-11 | 17 | 6 | 2.83 |

In a single game

| Rank | Player | Club | Tally | Total | Opposition |
|---|---|---|---|---|---|
| 1 | Jack Goulding | London | 2-13 | 19 | Sligo |
| 2 | Jack Goulding | London | 2-10 | 16 | Kildare |
| 3 | Cormac O'Doherty | Derry | 1-11 | 14 | Kildare |
| 4 | Jack Sheridan | Kildare | 2-07 | 13 | Derry |
| 5 | Gerard O'Kelly-Lynch | Sligo | 2-06 | 12 | Kildare |
| 5 | Jack Sheridan | Kildare | 1-09 | 12 | Derry |
| 5 | Jack Goulding | London | 0-12 | 12 | Tyrone |
| 8 | Gerard O'Kelly-Lynch | Sligo | 1-08 | 11 | Wicklow |
| 8 | Aidan Kelly | Tyrone | 1-08 | 11 | Wicklow |
| 8 | Jack Goulding | London | 1-08 | 11 | Derry |
| 8 | Gerard O'Kelly-Lynch | Sligo | 0-11 | 11 | Derry |
| 8 | Aidan Kelly | Tyrone | 0-11 | 11 | Derry |
| 8 | David Qualter | Kildare | 0-11 | 11 | Tyrone |

=== Scoring events ===
- Widest winning margin: 26 points
  - London 4-26 - 0-12 Sligo (Round 2)
- Most goals in a match: 4
  - Sligo 2-08 - 2-19 Kildare (Round 1)
  - Tyrone 2-12 - 2-23 London (Round 1)
  - London 4-26 - 0-12 Sligo (Round 2)
- Most points in a match: 41
  - Kildare 3-27 - 0-14 Wicklow (Round 2)
- Most goals by one team in a match: 4
  - London 4-26 - 0-12 Sligo (Round 2)
- Most points by one team in a match: 27
  - Kildare 3-27 - 0-14 Wicklow (Round 2)
- Highest aggregate score: 50 points
  - London 4-26 - 0-12 Sligo (Round 2)
  - Kildare 3-27 - 0-14 Wicklow (Round 2)
- Lowest aggregate score: 29 points
  - Wicklow 0-12 - 0-17 Derry (Round 1)

=== Miscellaneous ===
- First-time Christy Ring Cup meetings:
  - Tyrone v Kildare (Round 4)
  - Tyrone v Wicklow (Round 5)
- Kildare become the first county to qualify for 6 Christy Ring Cup finals.

== See also ==
- 2024 All-Ireland Senior Hurling Championship
- 2024 Leinster Senior Hurling Championship
- 2024 Munster Senior Hurling Championship
- 2024 Joe McDonagh Cup (Tier 2)
- 2024 Nicky Rackard Cup (Tier 4)
- 2024 Lory Meagher Cup (Tier 5)
