= 2022 Christy Ring Cup =

Hurling competition

- Dates: 9 April – 21 May 2022
- Teams: 6
- Champions: Kildare (4th title); Brian Byrne (captain); David Herity (manager)
- Runners-up: Mayo; Shane Boland (captain); Derek Walsh (manager)
- Relegated: Wicklow

Tournament statistics
- Matches played: 16
- Goals scored: 54 (3.38 per match)
- Points scored: 617 (38.56 per match)
- Top scorer(s): Shane Boland (1-52)

The 2022 Christy Ring Cup is the 18th staging of the Christy Ring Cup since its establishment by the Gaelic Athletic Association in 2005. The cup began on 9 April 2022 and ended on 21 May 2022.

London returned to the competition after a two-year hiatus due to the impact of the COVID-19 pandemic on Gaelic games. Kildare replaced 2021 champions Offaly in the competition, having come last in the Joe McDonagh Cup in 2021 while Mayo were promoted into the competition, having won the Nicky Rackard Cup in 2021, replacing Roscommon, who finished last in 2021.

The 2022 Christy Ring Cup is played on a Round-Robin basis. The counties who finish in the top two places shall qualify for the final, with the winner being promoted to the Joe McDonagh Cup. The bottom placed team in the Round Robin is relegated to the Nicky Rackard Cup.

Kildare player Niall Ó Muineacháin scored an own goal against London in the opening minute of their game.

== Team changes ==
=== To Championship ===
Relegated from the Joe McDonagh Cup

- Kildare

Promoted from the Nicky Rackard Cup

- Mayo

=== From Championship ===
Promoted to the Joe McDonagh Cup

- Offaly

Relegated to the Nicky Rackard Cup

- Roscommon

== Teams ==
=== General Information ===
County	Last Cup title	Last provincial title	Last All-Ireland title	Position in 2021 Championship	Appearance
Derry	—	2001	—	Runners-up	16th
Kildare	2020	—	—	Lost relegation playoff (Joe McDonagh Cup)	
London	2012	—	1901	—	10th
Mayo	—	1909	—	Champions (Nicky Rackard Cup)	14th
Sligo	—	—	—	Semi-finals	3rd
Wicklow	—	—	—	Semi-finals	

=== Personnel and kits ===
County	Manager	Captain(s)	Sponsor
Derry	Cormac Donnelly; Dominic McKinley	Cormac O'Doherty	
Kildare	David Herity	Brian Byrne	
London			
Mayo	Derek Walsh	Shane Boland	
Sligo	Padraig Mannion		
Wicklow	Éamonn Scallan	Martin O'Brien	

== Group stage ==
=== Table ===
Pos	Team	Pld	W	D	L	SF	SA	Diff	Pts	Qualification
1	Kildare	5	5	0	0	16-133	8-61	+96	10	Advance to Knockout Stage
2	Mayo	5	4	0	1	5-106	12-87	-2	8	Advance to Knockout Stage
3	Derry	5	3	0	2	8-85	5-81	+13	6	
4	London	5	2	0	3	7-96	9-108	-18	4	
5	Sligo	5	1	0	4	7-90	7-107	-17	2	
6	Wicklow	5	0	0	5	9-59	11-125	-72	0	Relegation to Nicky Rackard Cup

=== Fixtures and results ===
==== Round 1 ====
9 April 2022 Round 1	London	0–26 – 0–21	Sligo	McGovern Park, Ruislip
	R Crowley (0–12, 10f, 1 65'), B McCarry (0–4), D Hannon (0–3), F Collins (0–2), J Goulding (0–2), M Freaney (0–1), R Lombard (0–1), S Glynn (0–1)	Report	A Kilcullen (0–10,8f), G O'Kelly-Lynch (0–4, 1f, 1 65'), T Cawley (0–3), C Hanniffy (0–2), P Foley (0–1), R McHugh (0–1)

10 April 2022 Round 1	Derry	1–21 – 1–09	Wicklow	Celtic Park, Derry
	C O'Doherty (0–6,4f,1 '65), O McKeever (0–4), F Bradley (1–1), C Hendry (0–2), B McGilligan (0–2), J Mullan (0–2), M Lynch (0–2), R Mullen (0–1), M McGrath (0–1)	Report	B Ryan (0–4, 3f), E McCormack (1–0), J Doyle (0–3, 2f), O Young (0–2, 2f),

10 April 2022 Round 1	Mayo	0–11 – 5–26	Kildare	James Stephens Park, Ballina
	S Boland (0–5, 5f), K Higgins (0–3, 3f), J McManus (0–2), J Mooney (0–1)	Report	J Burke (0–9, 6f), J Sheridan (1–4), C Dowling (1–3), P Divilly (1–3), B Byrne (1–2), S Ryan (0–3), M Delaney (1–0), R Boran (0–1), C McCabe (0–1)

==== Round 2 ====
16 April 2022 Round 2	Wicklow	2–10 – 0–26	Mayo	Aughrim County Ground, Aughrim
	E Kavanagh (2–0), J Doyle (0–4,3f), B Ryan (0–3, 1f, 1 '65), E McCormack (0–2), J Toomey (0–1)	Report	J Mooney (0–8), S Kenny (0–5, 1f, 1 '65), S Boland (0–5, 2f), E Delaney (0–4), D Huane (0–1), A Phillips (0–1), K Higgins (0–1), K Feeney (0–1)

16 April 2022 Round 2	Kildare	3–35 – 3–14	London	St Conleth's Park, Newbridge
	J Sheridan (2–4), J Burke (0–9, 8f), G Keegan (0–4), M Delaney (1–1), C McCabe (0–3), C Dowling (0–3), P Dolan (0–2), B Byrne (0–2), S Ryan (0–2), R Boran (0–1), P Divilly (0–1), S Christianseen (0–1), P Leahy (0–1), J Travers (0–1)	Report	J Goulding (1–3), M Dwyer (0–3), R Crowley (0–3, 2f, 1 '65), Own Goal (1–0), F O'Keefe (1–0), C Byrne (0–2), S Lordan (0–1), M Flannery (0–1), S Glynn (0–1)

17 April 2022 Round 2	Sligo	0–11 – 2–20	Derry	Markievicz Park, Sligo
	G O'Kelly Lynch (0–4, 4f), M Munnelly (0–2), A Kilcullen (0–2, 2f), F Cawley (0–1), J McHugh (0–1), T Cawley (0–1)	Report	G Bradley (1–4), O McKeever (1–3), C O'Doherty (0–5, 4f, 1'65), D Foley (0–4), R Mullen (0–2), J Mullan (0–1), D McGilligan (0–1)

==== Round 3 ====
23 April 2022 Round 3	London	2–13 – 1–22	Mayo	McGovern Park, Ruislip
	D Hannon 1-8, C Byrne 1-0, M Dwyer 0-1, F O'Keeffe 0-1, J McCarthy 0-1, P Muldoon 0-1, S Glynn 0-1.		S Boland 1-6, J McManus 0-3, E Delaney 0-3, K Higgins 0-3, S Kenny 0-2, J Mooney 0-2, K Feeney 0-1, M Phillips 0-1, G McManus 0-1.

23 April 2022 Round 3	Kildare	1–24 – 0–12	Derry	St Conleth's Park, Newbridge
	J Burke (0–7, 4f, 1'65), C McCabe (1–4), G Keegan (0–6), J Byrne (0–2), R Boran (0–1), P Divilly (0–1), C Boran (0–1), C Dowling (0–1), S Ryan (0–1)	Report	R Mullan (0–5, 4f), C O'Doherty (0–2, 2f), D Foley (0–2, 1f), G Bradley (0–1), C Kelly (0–1), B Laverty (0–1)

23 April 2022 Round 3	Sligo	4–24 – 1–14	Wicklow	Markievicz Park, Sligo
	A Kilcullen (2–8, 7f), C Hannify (0–8), G O'Kelly Lynch (0–5, 4f), J McHugh (1–1), R Brennan (1–0), P Foley (0–2), T Cawley (0–1)	Report	J Doyle (0–6, 4f), S Germaine (1–2, 1-1f), B Ryan (0–3, 3f), M Murphy (0–2), E McCormack (0–1)

==== Round 4 ====
7 May 2022 Round 4	Wicklow	3–10 – 5–25	Kildare	Aughrim County Ground, Aughrim
	S Germaine (1-2, 1-0pen, 2f), J Henderson (1-1), B Ryan (0-3, 1f, 1 '65), M O'Brien (0-3), E Kavanagh (1-0), J Doyle (0-1)	Report	J Burke (1-9, 7f, 1'65), J Byrne (1-4), G Keegan (1-2), B Byrne (1-1), C Dowling (1-0), P Divilly (0-2), S Ryan (0-2), C McCabe (0-1), C Boran (0-1), P Dolan (0-1), P McKenna (0-1), D Costello (0-1)

7 May 2022 Round 4	Mayo	2–24 – 1–20	Sligo	James Stephens Park, Ballina
	S Boland (0-12, 11f), K Higgins (1-2), K Feeney (1-2), D Huane (0-2), S Kenny (0-2, 1f), J McManus (0-2), A Phillips (0-1), P Lyons (0-1)	Report	A Kilcullen (0-10, 8f), G O'Kelly Lynch (0-6, 4f), C Hannify (1-1), J McHugh (0-2), T Cawley (0-1)

8 May 2022 Round 4	Derry	3–14 – 1–14	London	Owenbeg, Dungiven
	C O’Doherty (0–4, 4f), O McKeever (1–1), T McHugh (1–1), R Mullen (0–3, 3f), G Bradley (1–0), D McGilligan (0–2), J Mullan (0–1), D Foley (0–1), E McGill (0–1)	Report	D Hannon (0–8, 6f, 1 '65), F O'Keefe (1–0), S Glynn (0–2), M Dwyer (0–1), C Nelson (0–1), B McCarry (0–1), J Goulding (0–1)

==== Round 5 ====
14 May 2022 Round 5	Kildare	2-23 - 2-14	Sligo	St Conleth's Park, Newbridge
	B Byrne (0-7), M Delaney (1-4), S Ryan (1-2), J Sheridan (0-4), C Kielty (0-2), C Boran (0-1), P. Dolan (0-1), F. Bass (0-1), D. Costello (0-1)	Report	A Kilcullen (1-11), T Cawley (1-0), G O’Kelly-Lynch (0-2), C Hannify (0-1)

14 May 2022 Round 5	London	1-29 - 2-16	Wicklow	McGovern Park, Ruislip
	J Goulding (1-6), D Hannon (0-8, 7f), S Glynn (0-3), M Dwyer (0-3), M Freaney (0-2), C Lordan (0-2), B McCarry (0-2), F O’Keefe (0-1), P Muldoon (0-1), M Flannery (0-1)	Report	S Germaine (2-5, 0-3f, 2-0pen), B Ryan (0-3, 1f, 1 ’65), E Kavanagh (0-2), M Murphy (0-1), J Henderson (0-1), J Doyle (0-1), O Young (0-1), R Lambe (0-1), K Conway (0-1)

14 May 2022 Round 5	Mayo	2-23 - 2-18	Derry	MacHale Park, Castlebar
	S Boland (0-12, 8f), J Mooney (1-3), K Feeney (1-1), J McManus (0-2), D Kenny (0-1), K Higgins (0-1), D Huane (0-1), S Kenny (0-1, f)	Report	J Mullan (1-3), C O’Doherty (0-6,6f), R McKeever (1-2), D Gilligan (0-2), D Foley (0-2), R Mullan (0-1), P Kelly (0-1), G Bradley (0-1)

== Knockout stage ==
=== Final ===
21 May 2022 Final	Kildare	2-29 - 0-19	Mayo	Croke Park, Dublin
	James Burke 0-11 (0-7f, 0-1 65), Gerry Keegan 0-10, Brian Byrne 1-2, Cathal Dowling 1-1, Cathal McCabe 0-3, Shane Ryan 0-1, Paul Dolan 0-1.	Report	Shane Boland 0-10 (0-8f), Kenny Feeney 0-3 (0-1f), Joseph McManus 0-2, Eoin Delaney 0-1, Joseph Mooney 0-1 (sideline), Keith Higgins 0-1, Seán Kenny 0-1f.	Referee: Michael Kennedy (Tipperary)

Kildare are promoted to the 2023 Joe McDonagh Cup.

== Statistics ==
=== Top scorers ===
==== Top Scorer Overall ====
Rank	Player	County	Tally	Total	Matches	Average
1	Shane Boland	Mayo	1-52	55	6	9.17
2	Andy Kilcullen	Sligo	3-41	50	5	10.00
3	James Burke	Kildare	1-44	47	5	9.40
4	Gerry Keegan	Kildare	1-23	26	4	6.50
5	Cormac O'Doherty	Derry	0–23	23	5	4.60
6	Brian Byrne	Kildare	3-13	22	6	3.67
7	Seanie Germaine	Wicklow	4-9	21	4	5.25
7	Jack Sheridan	Kildare	3–12	21	6	3.50
7	Gerard O'Kelly-Lynch	Sligo	0–21	21	5	4.25

==== In a single game ====
Rank	Player	County	Tally	Total	Opposition
1	Andy Kilcullen	Sligo	2–8	14	Wicklow
1	Andy Kilcullen	Sligo	1-11	14	Kildare
3	Ronan Crowley	London	0–12	12	Sligo
3	Shane Boland	Mayo	0–12	12	Sligo
3	James Burke	Kildare	1-9	12	Wicklow
3	Shane Boland	Mayo	0–12	12	Derry
7	Seanie Germaine	Wicklow	2-5	11	London
7	James Burke	Kildare	0-11	11	Mayo
7	Shane Boland	Mayo	1-08	11	London
10	Gerry Keegan	Kildare	0-10	10	Mayo
10	Andy Kilcullen	Sligo	0–10	10	London
10	Jack Sheridan	Kildare	2–4	10	London
10	Andy Kilcullen	Sligo	0–10	10	Mayo
10	James Burke	Kildare	0-10	10	Mayo
10	Shane Boland	Mayo	0–10	10	Kildare
