= 2007 Christy Ring Cup final =

Hurling match

- Event: 2007 Christy Ring Cup
Westmeath	Kildare
2-15	0-13
- Date: 5 August 2007
- Venue: Croke Park, Dublin
- Referee: John Sexton (Cork)

The 2007 Christy Ring Cup final was a hurling match played at Croke Park on 5 August 2007 to determine the winners of the 2007 Christy Ring Cup, the 3rd season of the Christy Ring Cup, a tournament organised by the Gaelic Athletic Association for the second tier hurling teams. The final was contested by Westmeath of Leinster and Kildare of Leinster, with Westmeath winning by 2-15 to 0-13.

The Christy Ring Cup final between Westmeath and Kildare was the second cup meeting between the two teams, with Kildare failing to beat Westmeath in their lone previous meeting. Westmeath were hoping to make history by becoming the first team to win a second Christy Ring Cup title. Kildare were appearing in their first cup final.

Westmeath got off the mark in the second minute when Derek McNicholas pointed before the midlanders took a 0-4 to 0-1 lead thanks to scores from Andrew Mitchell (free), Barry Kennedy and Pat Clarke. Oisín Lynch scored Kildare's first point in the 4th minute, however, he was the Lilywhites' only scorer from play in the entire first half. A superb flick through from Kennedy played in John Shaw for a Westmeath goal on the quarter-hour. An Andrew Mitchell goal had the inaugural champions 2-5 to 0-2 ahead and they continued to dominate as the first half came to a close, only conceding another point to Lynch. Kildare free-taker White did have a couple of chances to reduce the growing gap but he was off target as the Lilywhites ended the half with a total of nine wides.

Westmeath notched four of the second half's first five points to press home their advantage on the scoreboard – they were now 2-11 to 0-4 ahead with White providing the only resistance. He scored three times between the 43rd and 48th minutes to reduce the arrears to 2-12 to 0-7. Points from Shaw and Carty were replied to by Kildare wing forward Paddy O'Brien, who struck a brace of frees before getting injured. Kildare were having their best spell of the match as they tagged on a further three points through substitute Mattie Dowd and White (two frees) to make it an eight-point game (2-14 to 0-12). Kennedy slung over Westmeath's final point in the 62nd-minute, while Kildare substitute Dara Nolan registered the game's final score with a well-taken point as Westmeath held on for an encouraging victory.

Westmeath's victory was their second in three years. They became the first team to win the Christy Ring Cup twice.

== Match ==
=== Details ===
5 August 2007

Westmeath	2-15 - 0-13	Kildare
A Mitchell (1-03, 0-03f), J Shaw (1-02), D Carty (0-05), B Kennedy (0-02), D McNicholas (0-01), P Clarke (0-01), E Loughlin (0-01).	Report	B White (0-07, 6f), P O'Brien (0-02, 2f), O Lynch (0-02), M Dowd (0-01), D Nolan (0-01).

Croke Park, Dublin
Referee: J Sexton (Cork)

Westmeath	Kildare
