= 2005 Christy Ring Cup final =

- Event: 2005 Christy Ring Cup
| Westmeath | Down |
| 1–23 | 2–18 |
- Date: 14 August 2005
- Venue: Croke Park, Dublin
- Referee: Denis Richardson (Limerick)

The 2005 Christy Ring Cup final was a hurling match played at Croke Park on 14 August 2005 to determine the winners of the 2005 Christy Ring Cup, the inaugural season of the Christy Ring Cup, a tournament organised by the Gaelic Athletic Association for the second tier hurling teams. The final was contested by Westmeath of Leinster and Down of Ulster, with Westmeath winning by 1–23 to 2–18.

The Christy Ring Cup final between Westmeath and Down was the second championship meeting between the two teams, with Down failing to beat Westmeath in the earlier group stage.

Down led 0–5 to 0–2 after eight minutes, but inspired by some excellent play from defenders Brendan Murtagh and Darren McCormack and Enda Loughlin, Westmeath retired 0–12 to 0–9 up at half-time. The referee, however, seemed to have made a timekeeping error an only thirty-three minutes and 24 seconds had been played. Unaware, the players headed for the dressing room, although a Down selector did approach referee Denis Richardson with his stopwatch to bring the mistake to his attention, however, he was waved away.

An opportunist goal from Gareth Johnson on 43 minutes, after Westmeath goalkeeper, Mark Briody, had saved from Martin Coulter, edged Down 1–12 to 0–14 in front. But, on 54 minutes, a similar score from John Shaw after a point attempt from Barry Kennedy had come back off the bar, made it 1–18 to 1–14 for the midlanders, who, by the 61st minute, had stretched their advantage to 1–21 to 1–15. However, in the space of three minutes, Down were only a point adrift, with their second goal coming from Stephen Clarke, who drilled the sliotar to the top right-hand corner of the net. On 70 minutes, Martin Coulter levelled from a free, only for Westmeath to crucially hit the last two points.

== Match ==
=== Details ===
14 August 2005

| Westmeath | 1–23 – 2–18 | Down |
|---|---|---|
| A Mitchell (0–9, eight frees, '65), J Shaw (1–2), E Loughlin (0–4), K Cosgrove (0–3), B Murtagh (0–2), B Kennedy (0–2), R Whelan (0–1). | Report | M Coulter (0–8, eight frees), G Johnson (1–3), S Clarke (1–1), B McGourty (0–2), E Clarke (0–1), A Savage (0–1), S Wilson (0–1), G Adair (0–1). |

Croke Park, Dublin
Referee: D Richardson (Limerick)

| Westmeath | Down |
