= 2006 Christy Ring Cup final =

- Event: 2006 Christy Ring Cup
Antrim	Carlow
5–13	1–7
- Date: 6 August 2006
- Venue: Croke Park, Dublin
- Referee: James McGrath (Westmeath)

The 2006 Christy Ring Cup final was a hurling match played at Croke Park on 6 August 2006 to determine the winners of the 2006 Christy Ring Cup, the 2nd season of the Christy Ring Cup, a tournament organised by the Gaelic Athletic Association for the second tier hurling teams. The final was contested by Antrim of Ulster and Carlow of Leinster, with Antrim winning by 5–13 to 1–7.

The Christy Ring Cup final between Antrim and Carlow was the first championship meeting between the two teams. Both teams were appearing in their first cup finals.

Antrim got off to a flying start with a flurry of goals putting them 3–6 to no score clear. Goals from Joey Scullion (13 minutes), Johnny McIntosh (15) and Kieran Kelly (17) gave them an early lead, while Carlow waited 27 1/2 minutes before Damien Roberts opened their account with a point. They matched Antrim for the remainder of the half – with Roberts and team captain Robbie Foley swapping points with Paddy Richmond and Brian McFall – to cut the gap to 14 points by half-time.

Carlow raised the tempo for the second half. Pat Coady landed a free and two '65's to help his side pare back the difference to 3–8 to 0–6 by the 53rd minute. Carlow hit four of the second half's opening five points with substitute Seánie McMahon firing over the best of the lot from a tight angle on the left. Antrim steadied themselves on 56 minutes when Barney McAuley dangled a ball deep into Carlow territory and McIntosh latched onto it to thump home goal number four off the ground. A Coady free was then batted off the Antrim line before Foley notched his second point for a 4–8 to 0–7 score line. More Antrimk points followed before a strong 66th minute run from Malachy Molloy ended with McFall netting the fifth goal. Foley scored a penalty for Carlow, however, the difference in standard was apparent and Antrim powered to an 18-point victory.

== Match ==
=== Details ===
6 August 2006

Antrim	5–13 – 1–7	Carlow
J McIntosh (2-04 (4f)), B McFall (1-02), K Kelly (1-01), J Scullion (1-00), M Molloy (0-02 (2 '65')), P Richmond (0-02), P Magill (0-01), B Delargy (0-01).		F Foley (1-00 (1-00 pen)), P Coady (0-03 (1f, 2 '65')), R Foley (0-02), D Roberts (0-01), S McMahon (0-01).

Croke Park, Dublin
Referee: James McGrath (Westmeath)

Antrim	Carlow
