= 2010 Christy Ring Cup final =

Hurling decider

- Event: 2010 Christy Ring Cup
Westmeath	Kerry
2-16	1-18
- Date: 3 July 2010
- Venue: Croke Park, Dublin
- Referee: Tony Carroll (Offaly)

The 2010 Christy Ring Cup final was a hurling match played at Croke Park on 3 July 2010 to determine the winners of the 2010 Christy Ring Cup, the 6th season of the Christy Ring Cup, a tournament organised by the Gaelic Athletic Association for the second tier hurling teams. The final was contested by Westmeath of Leinster and Kerry of Munster, with Westmeath winning by 2-16 to 1-18.

The Christy Ring Cup final between Westmeath and Kerry was the second championship meeting between the two teams, with Kerry failing to beat Westmeath in their previous meeting. Westmeath were appearing in their fourth Christy Ring Cup final and were hoping to win a record third Christy Ring Cup title. Kerry were appearing in their first cup final.

Kerry picked off scores at an impressive rate in the opening 10 minutes. Westmeath responded with points from three points, but Kerry were always able to keep their noses in front through John Griffin and Mikey Boyle. They led by 0-8 to 0-5 after O’Connell had raced through for a point from play, and the same player made it 0-11 to 0-6 on the half-hour with another great effort. Westmeath insisted on going for goals, however, their three efforts were repelled. The Midlanders did find the net in the 32nd minute when Shane Dan Carthy blasted to the net to reduce the deficit to two points.

Kerry led by 0-12 to 1-7 at the break, but went level five minutes into the second half when Paul Greville hit their second goal. O’Connell continued to strike accurately from frees, but a couple of sweetly struck Murtagh points kept the sides deadlocked through the third quarter. Westmeath went ahead for the first time since the sixth minute when Stephen Bardon guided over a point from wide on the right. The Midlanders were growing in confidence, epitomised by Carthy’s point to send them three clear with 15 minutes to play. Joe Carthy added a point, however, Kerry responded as Shane Brick was on hand to fire in a goal after his driven 20 metre free had been parried by goalkeeper Pat Burke. Mike Conway levelled, and Mike boyle hit the lead point for Kerry with two minutes to play. Westmeath, however, had more to offer and after Murtagh had given them parity again, Dermody took centre stage with a late winner.

Westmeath's Christy Ring Cup victory was their third even giving them first place on the all-time roll of honour. They remain the only team to have won three Christy Ring Cup titles.

== Match ==
=== Details ===
3 July 2010

Westmeath	2-16 - 1-18	Kerry
P Greville (1-2), D Carthy (1-2), B Murtagh (0-4, 1f), S Bardon (0-3), J Clarke (0-2), E Loughlin (0-1), B Leharte (0-1).		D O’Connell (0-8, 6f), S Brick (1-0), J Egan (0-3), M Boyle (0-2), J Griffin (0-2), M Conway (0-1), J Flaherty (0-1), S Nolan (0-1).

Croke Park, Dublin
Referee: T Carroll (Offaly)

Westmeath	Kerry
