= 2015 Christy Ring Cup final =

Hurling decider

- Event: 2015 Christy Ring Cup
Kerry	Derry
1-20	0-12
- Date: 6 June 2015
- Venue: Croke Park, Dublin
- Referee: John Keane (Galway)

The 2015 Christy Ring Cup final was a hurling match played at Croke Park on 6 June 2015 to determine the winners of the 2015 Christy Ring Cup, the 11th season of the Christy Ring Cup, a tournament organised by the Gaelic Athletic Association for the second tier hurling teams. The final was contested by Kerry of Munster and Derry of Ulster, with Kerry winning by 1-20 to 0-12.

== Background ==
The Christy Ring Cup final between Kerry and Derry was the third championship meeting between the two teams, with Derry having failed to beat Kerry on the two previous occasions. Kerry were appearing in their fourth final in five years and were hoping to win their second cup title, having lost the two previous finals. Derry were appearing in their very first final.

== Match details ==
Michael O'Leary and Shane Nolan were on target early on as Kerry pushed ahead, but Derry gradually settled, and Ruairí Convery and Alan Grant closed the gap, before Convery leveled with his second free in the 13th minute. Kerry were much more assured and took a 0-6 to 0-3 lead by the end of the opening quarter. Daniel Collins swept over a point before Nolan spun away from his marker to flash a shot to the net on the 30th minute to give Kerry a 1-9 to 0-5 lead. Derry staged a minor revival with three converted frees, including Convery’s fifth, but they trailed by 1-10 to 0-8 at the break.

A slow start to the second half failed to produce a score for 10 minutes, before Nolan set about adding to his tally from placed balls. Kerry had more goal chances, but Mikey Boyle flashed a shot just wide at the far post, before Pádraig Boyle had his effort blocked by Conor Quinn. Paddy Henry sent over a couple of long range efforts, but Derry’s only score from play in the second period came from substitute Jonathan O'Dwyer. Kerry shot six of the game’s last seven points, with wing back Keith Carmody hitting his third, and Nolan smacking over three more frees.

Kerry's Christy Ring Cup victory was their first since 2011. The win gave them their second cup title overall and put them in joint second place with Carlow on the all-time roll of honour.

Derry's Christy Ring Cup defeat was their first ever. They remain a team who has contested cup finals but has never claimed the ultimate prize.

== Match ==
=== Details ===
6 June 2015
17:30

Kerry	1-20 - 0-12	Derry
S Nolan 1-8 (7f), K Carmody, M O'Leary 0-3 each, P Kelly, C Harty 0-2 each, D Collins, J Egan 0-1 each.	Report	R Convery 0-5 (5f), P Henry 0-4 (4f), L Hinphey, J O'Dwyer, A Grant 0-1 each.

Croke Park, Dublin
Referee: J Keane (Galway)

Kerry	Derry
