= 2011 Westmeath Senior Hurling Championship =

Annual hurling competition season

- Champions: Clonkill (12th title); Andrew Mitchell (captain)
- Runners-up: Castletown Geoghegan; Ronan Whelan (captain)

The 2011 Westmeath Senior Hurling Championship was the 107th staging of the Westmeath Senior Hurling Championship since its establishment by the Westmeath County Board in 1903.

Raharney were the defending champions.

The final was played on 16 October 2011 at Cusack Park in Mullingar, between Clonkill and Castletown Geoghegan, in what was their first ever meeting in the final. Clonkill won the match by 1–13 to 0–14 to claim their 12th championship title overall and a first title in two years.

== Results ==
=== Final ===
16 October 2011 Final	Clonkill	1-13 - 0-14	Castletown Geoghegan	Cusack Park
