= Bernard Deay =

Irish hurler

Personal information
- Born: 14 July 1991 (age 35)
- Occupation: Architectural technologist
- Height: 6 ft 1 in (185 cm)

Sport
- Sport: Hurling
- Position: Left wing-forward
Club
- Years: Club
- Clane
Club titles
- Kildare titles: 0
Inter-county
- Years: County
- 2013-present: Kildare
Inter-county titles
- Leinster titles: 0
- All-Irelands: 1
- NHL: 0
- All Stars: 0

Bernard Deay (born 14 July 1991) is an Irish hurler who plays as a left wing-forward for the Kildare senior team.

Born in the United States, Deay made his senior debut for Kildare in the 2013 Christy Ring Cup. He has gone on to play a key role for the team since then, and has won one Christy Ring Cup medal.

At club level Deay plays with Clane.

== Honours ==
=== Team ===
Kildare

- Christy Ring Cup (2): 2014/2107
