= 2020 Christy Ring Cup =

Gaelic sport (hurling) competition

- Dates: 24 October 2020 – 22 November 2020
- Teams: 7
- Champions: Kildare (3rd title); Brian Byrne (captain); David Herity (manager)
- Runners-up: Down; Stephen Keith (captain); Ronan Sheehan (manager)

Tournament statistics
- Matches played: 7
- Goals scored: 17 (2.43 per match)
- Points scored: 239 (34.14 per match)
- Top scorer(s): Cathal Dolan (2-25)

The 2020 Christy Ring Cup was the 16th staging of the Christy Ring Cup hurling championship since its establishment by the Gaelic Athletic Association in 2005. It is the third tier of hurling as of 2020.

London were scheduled to compete in the Christy Ring Cup but didn't due to the impact of the COVID-19 pandemic on Gaelic games. The championship was scheduled to begin in May 2020 but was delayed until 24 October 2020.

The rise in COVID-19 cases affected the tournament, with two first-round games conceded due to positive tests.

Kildare were the winners, defeating Down in the final following earlier wins against Wicklow and Roscommon. Both finalists were promoted to the Joe McDonagh Cup for 2021.

The competition featured the first ever inter-county hurling penalty shootout, with Down qualifying for the final by causing an upset through knocking Offaly out in the semi-final.

== Team changes ==
=== To Championship ===
Relegated from the Joe McDonagh Cup

- Offaly

Promoted from the Nicky Rackard Cup

- Sligo

=== From Championship ===
Promoted to the Joe McDonagh Cup

- Meath

Relegated to the Nicky Rackard Cup

- Donegal

== Format ==
Due to the COVID-19 pandemic, the normal structure of eight teams competing in two groups of four was abandoned. Seven teams competed in the 2020 Christy Ring Cup. London did not compete as the quarantine restrictions on travel meant that their participation was not feasible.

The 2020 championship had a "back-door" structure designed to ensure that each team had at least two games. Offaly and Sligo conceded their round one games due to rising cases of COVID-19 and Sligo only managed to play one game before being eliminated.

- Six teams play each in the three Round 1 games. One team receives a bye to Round 2A.
- The three Round 1 winners, plus the team that received a bye, play in Round 2A.
  - The two Round 2A winners advance to the semi-finals.
  - The losers of the game between a Round 1 winner and the bye-receiving team goes into Round 2B.
- The three Round 1 losers and one of the Round 2A losers play in Round 2B.
  - The Round 2B winners advance to the semi-finals.
- The semi-finals are played between the two Round 2A winners and the two Round 2B winners.
- The final is between the two semi-final winners.

== Round 1 ==
Winners advance to Round 2A. Losers advance to Round 2B.

24 October 2020 Round 1	Kildare	w/o – conc.	Offaly	O'Connor Park
		Report

25 October 2020 Round 1	Roscommon	3-14 – 2-19	Wicklow	Dr. Hyde Park
	C Dolan 2-6 (3f, 1 '65); E Flanagan 1-2 (1-2f), C Mulry, C Egan 0-2 each; E Coyle, J Coyne 0-1 each.	Report	C Moorehouse 2-9 (1 pen, 5f); M Boland 0-4; D Staunton 0-3 (1 sl); M Lee, E McCormack, E Byrne 0-1 each.

25 October 2020 Round 1	Derry	w/o – conc.	Sligo	Celtic Park

- Down received a bye in this round.

== Round 2 ==
=== Round 2A ===
The Round 1 winners and Down, who received a bye, competed in this round. Winners advance to Semi-Finals.

31 October 2020 Round 2A	Down	1-13 – 0-13	Derry	McKenna Park
	O MacManus (0-7f); D Hughes (1-2), P Sheehan (0-2f), P Óg McCrickard (0-1 sideline), C Woods (0-1).	Report	C O'Doherty (0-6, 5f); M Craig (0-2); C Kelly (0-2), M McGuigan (0-1), J McGuigan (0-1).	Referee: C Mooney (Dublin)

1 November 2020 Round 2A	Kildare	2-14 – 1-10	Wicklow	St Conleth's Park
	J Sheridan 2-3 (0-2f); B Byrne 0-4 (3f); J Burke 0-3; C Dowling 0-2; C Dowling 0-1; D Slattery 0-1.	Report	C Moorehouse 0-9 (5f); E McCormack 1-1.

=== Round 2B ===
The Round 1 loser and one 'lucky loser' from round 2A, Derry entered this round. Winners advance to Semi-Finals.

7 November 2020 Round 2B	Derry	1-12 – 0-32	Offaly	Páirc Esler
	C O'Doherty (0-8f), R Mullan (1-0); F Bradley (0-2), C Kelly (0-1), J McGuigan (0-1).	Report	E Cahill (0-17, 1 '65'. 12f), L Langton (0-3), P Geraghty (0-2); C Gath (0-2), O Kelly (0-2), J Sampson (0-1), D Nally (0-1); B Conneely (0-1), B Duignan (0-1), T Geraghty (0-1), S Cleary (0-1).

8 November 2020 Round 2B	Roscommon	0-20 – 0-17	Sligo	Waldron Park
	C Dolan 0-13(11f), J Coyne 0-2, C Mulry 0-2, S Curley 0-1(1f), O Kelly, E Costello 0-1 each.	Report	G O'Kelly-Lynch 0-12 (11f), C Hannify 0-2, T O'Kelly-Lynch 0-1, A Kilcullen 0-1, M Hannify 0-1 (1f).	Referee: Richie Fitzsimons

== Semi-finals ==
The Round 2A winners play the Round 2B winners. The winners advance to the final and were both promoted to the 2021 Joe McDonagh Cup.

14 November 2020 Semi-Final	Down	1-23 – 2-20 (a.e.t.) (3–2 p)	Offaly	Newry
13:30 GMT	O McManus 0-7 (6f, 1 '65'), E Sands 1-2, D Sands 1-1, P Sheehan 0-4f, P Og McCrickard 0-3, B Trainor, C Woods (f), D Hughes 0-1 each	Report	E Cahill 0-10 (9f), S Kinsella 1-2, C Kiely 0-3, A Hynes and L Langton (1f) 0-2 each, D King, P Geraghty, A Treacy (f) and T Geraghty 0-1 each	Stadium: Páirc Esler; Attendance: 0 Referee: Sean Stack
	Penalties
	Marc Fisher ✗; Paul Sheehan ✗; Conor Woods; Caolan Taggart; Stephen Keith		Eoghan Cahill; Brian Duignan; ✗ Aidan Treacy; ✗ Stephen Corcoran; ✗ Cillian Kiely

14 November 2020 Semi-Final	Kildare	3-24 – 1-08	Roscommon	Newbridge
13:30 GMT	J Sheridan 2-6 (1-0pen, 0-4 frees, 0-1 '65'), B Byrne 0-8 (4f, 65), J Burke 1-2, N Ó Muineacháin 0-2, P Divilly 0-2, R Boran 0-1, K Whelan 0-1, C Dowling 0-1, S Ryan 0-1	Report	C Dolan 0-6 (0-3 frees), J Lohan 1-0, C Mulry 0-1, N Kilroy 0-1, E Flanagan 0-1 (0-1 frees).	Stadium: St Conleth's Park; Attendance: 0 Referee: Thomas Gleeson (Dublin)

== Final ==
22 November 2020 Final	Down	0-22 – 3-16	Kildare	Dublin
16:00 GMT	O McManus 0-9, (0-7 frees), P McCrickard 0-4, (0-1 sideline), T Prenter 0-4, P Sheehan 0-2 (0-1 free) C Woods 0-1 (free), D Sands 0-1	Report	B Byrne 0-7 (0-6 frees), J Sheridan 1-4 (0-3 frees, 0-1 '65'), P Divilly 1-1, T Burke 1-0, J Burke 0-2, S Ryan 0-1	Stadium: Croke Park; Attendance: 0 Referee: Chris Mooney (Dublin)

Down and Kildare are promoted to the 2021 Joe McDonagh Cup.

== Bracket ==
Round 1
Down
Bye
Derry	w/o
Sligo	scr.
Kildare	w/o
Offaly	scr.
Roscommon	3-14
Wicklow	2-19

Round 2
Down	1-13
Derry	0-13
Derry	1-12
Offaly	0-32
Kildare	2-14
Wicklow	1-10
Roscommon	0-20
Sligo	0-17

Semi-Finals
Down	1-23 AET
Offaly	2-20
Kildare	3-24
Roscommon	1-08

Final
Down	0-22
Kildare	3-16

== Statistics ==
=== Top scorers ===
Overall

Rank	Player	Club	Tally	Total	Matches	Average
1	Cathal Dolan	Roscommon	2-25	31	3	10.33
2	Eoghan Cahill	Offaly	0-27	27	2	13.50
3	Christy Moorehouse	Wicklow	2-18	24	2	12.00
4	Jack Sheridan	Kildare	4-09	21	2	10.50
5	Cormac O'Doherty	Derry	0-14	14	2	7.00
5	Oisín MacManus	Down	0-14	14	2	7.00
6	Gerard O'Kelly-Lynch	Sligo	0-12	12	1	12.00
6	Brian Byrne	Kildare	0-12	12	2	6.00

In a single game

Rank	Player	Club	Tally	Total	Opposition
1	Eoghan Cahill	Offaly	0-17	17	Derry
2	Christy Moorehouse	Wicklow	2-09	15	Roscommon
3	Cathal Dolan	Roscommon	0-13	13	Sligo
4	Cathal Dolan	Roscommon	2-06	12	Wicklow
4	Jack Sheridan	Kildare	2-06	12	Roscommon
4	Gerard O'Kelly-Lynch	Sligo	0-12	12	Roscommon
5	Eoghan Cahill	Offaly	0-10	10	Down
6	Jack Sheridan	Kildare	2-03	9	Wicklow
6	Christy Moorehouse	Wicklow	0-09	9	Kildare
7	Cormac O'Doherty	Derry	0-08	8	Offaly
7	Brian Byrne	Kildare	0-08	8	Offaly
