= Niall Ó Muineacháin =

Irish hurler

Personal information
- Born: 10 July 1989 (age 37) Celbridge, County Kildare, Ireland
- Height: 6 ft 2 in (188 cm)

Sport
- Sport: Hurling
- Position: Left corner-back
Club
- Years: Club
- Celbridge
Club titles
- Kildare titles: 4
Inter-county
- Years: County
- 2008-present: Kildare
Inter-county titles
- Leinster titles: 0
- All-Irelands: 0
- NHL: 2
- All Stars: Christy Ring all star 2010

Niall Ó Muineacháin (born 10 July 1989) is an Irish hurler who plays as a left corner-back for the Kildare senior team.

Born in Celbridge, County Kildare, Mackey first arrived on the inter-county scene when he first linked up with the Kildare minor team, before later lining out with the under-21 side. He made his senior debut in the 2008 Christy Ring Cup. Ó Muineacháin has gone on to play a key role for Kildare since then, and has won one Christy Ring Cup medal and one National League (Division 3A) medal.

At club level Ó Muineacháin is a four-time championship medallist with Celbridge.

He scored an own goal against London in the opening minute of the 2022 Christy Ring Cup contest.

== Honours ==
=== Team ===
Celbridge

- Kildare Senior Hurling Championship (4): 2009, 2010, 2011, 2013

Kildare

- Christy Ring Cup (1): 2014 (c)
- National League (Division 3A) (1): 2009
- Kehoe Cup (1): 2013

Sporting positions
Preceded by Fiachra Ó Muineacháin	Kildare Senior Hurling Captain; 2014	Succeeded by
Achievements
Preceded by Paul Braniff (Down)	Christy Ring Cup Final winning captain 2014	Succeeded by John Griffin (Kerry)
