= Darren McCormack (hurler) =

Irish hurler and Gaelic footballer

Personal information
- Native name: Darrin Mac Cormaic (Irish)
- Born: 29 July 1978 (age 48) Castlepollard, County Westmeath, Ireland
- Occupation: Plumber
- Height: 5 ft 10 in (178 cm)

Sport
- Sport: Hurling
- Position: Centre-back
Club
- Years: Club
- Castlepollard
Club titles
- Westmeath titles: 4
Inter-county
- Years: County
- 1997–2012: Westmeath
Inter-county titles
- Leinster titles: 0
- All-Irelands: 0
- NHL: 0
- All Stars: 0

Darren McCormack (born 29 July 1978) is an Irish hurler who played as a centre-back for the Westmeath senior team.

Born in Castlepollard, County Westmeath, McCormack first arrived on the inter-county scene at the age of seventeen when he first linked up with the Westmeath minor teams as a dual player, before joining the under-21 hurling side. He made his senior debut during the 1997 league. McCormack subsequently became a regular member of the starting fifteen and won three Christy Ring Cup medals.

As a member of the Leinster inter-provincial team on a number of occasions, McCormack won one Railway Cup medal. At club level he is a four-time championship medallist with Castlepollard.

McCormack announced his retirement from inter-county hurling on 24 May 2012.

== Honours ==
Castlepollard

- Westmeath Senior Hurling Championship (4): 1995, 1997, 2003, 2005

Westmeath

- Christy Ring Cup (3): 2005, 2007, 2010

Sporting positions
Preceded by	Westmeath Senior Hurling Captain; 2007	Succeeded by Brendan Murtagh
Achievements
Preceded by Karl McKeegan (Antrim)	Christy Ring Cup winning captain 2007	Succeeded by Edward Coady (Carlow)
