= 2016 Christy Ring Cup final =

Hurling decider

- Event: 2016 Christy Ring Cup
Antrim	Meath
Antrim	Meath
1-20	2-17
- Date: 4 June 2016
- Venue: Croke Park, Dublin
- Referee: John O'Brien (Tipperary)

Replay
Antrim	Meath
5-17	4-21
- Date: 25 June 2016
- Venue: Croke Park, Dublin
- Referee: Cathal McAllister (Cork)
- Attendance: 2,938

The 2016 Christy Ring Cup final was a hurling match played at Croke Park on 4 June 2016 to determine the winners of the 2016 Christy Ring Cup, the 12th season of the Christy Ring Cup, a tournament organised by the Gaelic Athletic Association for the second tier hurling teams. The final was contested by Antrim of Ulster and Meath of Leinster, with the game ending in a controversial 1–20 to 2–17 draw.

The final between Antrim and Meath was the second Ring Cup meeting between the two teams, with Meath failing to beat Antrim on the previous occasion in 2006. Antrim were appearing in their second final ever and were hoping to make a speedy return to the All-Ireland Senior Hurling Championship after being relegated in 2015. Meath were appearing in their very first final.

Antrim eased ahead with scores from Ciarán Clarke, from a ’65, James Connolly and Conor Johnston. In the 15th minute Johnston sent a bullet to the net after being picked out perfectly by Clarke's cut-back from the end line. Niall McKenna, Connolly and Clarke, with a delightful effort from right on the sideline, were all on target for a 1–7 to 0–1 lead by the 19th minute. James Toher converted a series of frees for Meath and reduced the deficit to 1–10 to 0–7 at the break.

Meath were right back in contention when Neil Heffernan smashed home a brilliant goal five minutes into the second half. In the 70th minute, Kevin Keena squared the ball to fellow sub Seán Quigley, who smashed home a goal from 20 metres. Quigley added a stoppage-time point, and Meath had secured what appeared to be a sensational 2–18 to 1–20 victory.

However, while the Croke Park scoreboard and the TG4 television graphic had Meath as winners, many reporters at the game had it down as a draw in their notes. The scorers list for Meath recorded only 23 points in their 24 to 23-point win. The confusion appears to have arisen from an incident in the 63rd minute. Ahead 1–19 to 1–15, Antrim scored a point but the TG4 graphic moved the Meath score to 1-16 and left the Saffrons at 1–19. Referee John O’Brien from Tipperary later told TG4 that his report confirms the result in Meath's favour. After an appeal by Antrim, the game was deemed to have ended in a draw and Meath eventually agreed to a replay.

== Match details ==
=== Drawn match ===
6 June 2015
17:30

Antrim	1-20 - 2-17	Meath
C Johnston 1-2, C Clarke 0-5 (1f, 1 '65), J Connolly 0-4, E McCloskey, N McKenna 0-3 each, E Campbell, C McKinley, S McAfee 0-1 each.	Report	N Heffernan, S Quigley 1-1 each, J Toher 0-5 (5f), A Gannon, J Keena 0-3 each, K Keoghan 0-2, S Heavey, K Keena 0-1 each.

Croke Park, Dublin
Referee: J O'Brien (Tipperary)

Antrim	Meath

=== Replay ===
25 June 2015
17:00

Antrim	5-17 - 4-21	Meath
	Report

Croke Park, Dublin
Referee: C McAllister (Cork)

Antrim	Meath
