= Ben Conneely =

Irish hurler

Personal information
- Native name: Beircheart Mac Conghaile (Irish)
- Born: 1997 (age 28–29) Banagher, County Offaly, Ireland
- Height: 6 ft 3 in (191 cm)

Sport
- Sport: Hurling
- Position: Centre-back
Club
- Years: Club
- St Rynagh's
Club titles
- Offaly titles: 4
College
- Years: College
- Limerick Institute of Technology
College titles
- Fitzgibbon titles: 0
Inter-county*
Years	County	Apps (scores)
2016-present	Offaly	55
Inter-county titles
- Leinster titles: 0
- All-Irelands: 0
- NHL: 0
- All Stars: 0
- *Inter County team apps and scores correct as of 16:34, 15 July 2021.

Ben Conneely (born 1996) is an Irish hurler who plays for Offaly Championship club St Rynagh's and at inter-county level with the Offaly senior hurling team. He usually lines out as a centre-back.

== Career ==
Born in Banagher, County Offaly, Conneely first came to hurling prominence at juvenile and underage levels with the St Rynagh's club. He eventually progressed onto the club's senior team and has since won two County Championship titles. Conneely first appeared on the inter-county scene during a two-year stint with the Offaly minor team before later lining out with the under-21 team. He made his first appearance with the Offaly senior hurling team during the 2016 Leinster Championship.

== Honours ==
St Rynagh's

- Offaly Senior Hurling Championship: 2016, 2019 Offaly Senior Hurling championship {2020} Offaly senior hurling championship {2021}

Offaly

- Christy Ring Cup: 2021 (c)
- National Hurling League Division 2A: 2021 (c)

Joe Mcdonagh Cup: 2024 (c)

Sporting positions
Preceded by	Offaly Senior Hurling Captain; 2021-2022	Succeeded by Jason Sampson
Achievements
Preceded by Brian Byrne	Christy Ring Cup winning captain 2021	Succeeded by Brian Byrne
