= Colin Harris (hurler) =

Irish hurler

Personal information
- Born: County Kerry, Ireland
- Occupation: Civil Engineer
- Height: 6 ft 3 in (191 cm)

Sport
- Sport: Hurling
- Position: Half\Full Back
Club
- Years: Club
- Kilmoyley
Club titles
- Kerry titles: 6
Inter-county
- Years: County
- 2003-2012: Kerry
Inter-county titles
- Munster titles: 0
- All-Irelands: 0
- All Stars: 0

Colin Harris is a hurler from County Kerry, Ireland. He has played with the Kerry intercounty team. He played his club hurling with Kilmoyley with whom he won six County Championship medals in 2001–2004 and 2008–09. He later joined Cork club Ballincollig.

With Kerry, he won the National Hurling League Div 3A title as captain in 2010. He was also part of the Kerry team that made the 2010 final of the Christy Ring Cup, in which they were beaten by Westmeath. He made up for the 2011 loss when Kerry ran out easy winners over Wicklow in the final. He was Kerry's inter-county hurling team captain in 2005 and 2010.
