= Mikey Boyle =

Irish hurler

Personal information
- Born: Ballyduff, County Kerry

Sport
- Sport: Hurling
- Position: Forward
Club
- Years: Club
- 200?-: Ballyduff
Club titles
- Kerry titles: 4
Inter-county
- Years: County
- 2006-2024: Kerry
Inter-county titles
- Munster titles: 0
- All-Irelands: 0
- NFL: 1(div 3a)

Mikey Boyle is a hurler who plays with Ballyduff and Kerry.

== Causeway Comprehensive School ==
Boyle played with Causeway Comprehensive School during his school days. He helped the school to win the 2003 All-Ireland Vocational Schools Football Championship after a win over Holy Trinity College, Cookstown.

== Club ==
Boyle plays both football and hurling with Ballyduff and has enjoyed success in both codes.

His first major success with the club was when he won a Kerry Minor Hurling Championship with the club in 2003.

His next success would come in football as the club won a surprise back to back North Kerry Senior Football Championship when they beat Listowel Emmets in 2005 and 2006.

Sporting positions
Preceded by Colin Harris	Kerry Senior Hurling Captain; 2011	Succeeded by Liam Boyle
Achievements
Preceded by Andrew Mitchell (Westmeath)	Christy Ring Cup Final winning captain 2011	Succeeded by Colm Quinn (London)
