= Kieran Kelly (hurler) =

Irish hurler

Personal information
- Native name: Ciarán Ó Ceallaigh (Irish)
- Born: Antrim, Northern Ireland

Sport
- Sport: Hurling
- Position: Full Back
Club
- Years: Club
- ? -Present: Ballycastle McQuillan
Inter-county
- Years: County
- ? - Present: Antrim
Inter-county titles
- Ulster titles: ?

Kieran Kelly is a former senior inter county hurling player for Antrim and McQuillans of Ballycastle. Kelly usually played in the full-back position when playing with Antrim. Kelly represented Ireland in the Senior Hurling/Shinty Internationals in 2002. He won an Ulster Senior Hurling Championship medal with Antrim in 2007 during a 2-24 to 0-04 win over Down.
