= Wayne O'Gorman =

Irish hurler and Gaelic footballer

Personal information
- Born: County Wicklow
- Occupation: electrician

Sport
- Football Position: Forward
- Hurling Position: Goalkeeper/Forward
Clubs
- Years: Club
- Rathnew; Glenealy
Club titles
| | Football | Hurling |
| Wicklow titles | 1 | 4 |
| Leinster titles | | 0 |
Inter-county
- Years: County
- Wicklow (H); Wicklow (F)

Wayne O'Gorman is a dual player from County Wicklow, Ireland. He played both Gaelic football and hurling with Wicklow during the 2000s. He was also part of the Wicklow team that won the All-Ireland Junior Football Championship Title in 2002 where he scored 3-02 in the final win over Kerry. He plays his club football with Ashford and hurling with Glenealy with whom he has won County Championship medals.
