= Eoghan Cahill =

Irish hurler

Personal information
- Native name: Eoghan Ó Cathail (Irish)
- Born: 1997 (age 28–29) Birr, County Offaly, Ireland

Sport
- Sport: Hurling
- Position: Right wing-forward
Club
- Years: Club
- 2015-present: Birr
Club titles
- Offaly titles: 0
College
- Years: College
- Mary Immaculate College
College titles
- Fitzgibbon titles: 0
Inter-county*
Years	County	Apps (scores)
2018-present	Offaly	6 (1-12)
Inter-county titles
- Leinster titles: 0
- All-Irelands: 0
- NHL: 0
- All Stars: 0
- *Inter County team apps and scores correct as of 10:34, 19 June 2024.

Eoghan Cahill (born 1997) is an Irish hurler who plays for Offaly Senior Championship club Birr and at inter-county level with the Offaly senior hurling team. He usually lines out as a forward after beginning his career as a goalkeeper.

== Career ==
Born in Birr, County Offaly, Cahill is the son of former Offaly player Gary Cahill. He first came to prominence as juvenile and under age levels with Birr before progressing onto the club's senior team. He simultaneously lined out with Mary Immaculate College in the Fitzgibbon Cup and was included on that competition's Team of the Year in 2019.

Cahill first appeared on the inter-county scene with Offaly during a two-year stint with the minor team before a three-year stint with the under-21 team, during which time he moved from being an outfield player to goalkeeper. He made his debut with the senior team during the 2018 National Hurling League.

Cahill secured his first silverware during the 2021 season, when Offaly claimed the National League Division 2A and Christy Ring Cup titles. He claimed further Division 2A honours in 2023 before winning a Joe McDonagh Cup medal after a defeat of Laois in the 2024 final.

== Career statistics ==
As of 25 May 2025.

Team	Year	National League			Ring Cup		McDonagh Cup		Leinster		All-Ireland		Total	
Team	Year	Division	Apps	Score	Apps	Score	Apps	Score	Apps	Score	Apps	Score	Apps	Score
Offaly	2018	Division 1A	3	0-00	—		—		4	0-00	—		7	0-00
Offaly	2019	Division 1A	5	0-00	—		4	0-00	—		—		9	0-00
Offaly	2020	Division 2A	5	0-50	2	0-27	—		—		—		7	0-77
Offaly	2021	Division 2A	4	2-43	3	0-36	—		—		—		7	2-79
Offaly	2022	Division 1A	5	3-36	—		5	0-62	—		—		10	3-98
Offaly	2023	Division 2A	7	0-81	—		5	4-53	—		1	1-07	13	5-141
Offaly	2024	Division 1A	4	0-31	—		5	1-25	—		1	0-05	10	1-61
Offaly	2025	Division 1B	2	0-01	—		—		3	0-00	—		5	0-01
Total			35	5-242	5	0-63	19	5-140	7	0-00	2	1-12	68	11-457

== Honours ==
Offaly

- Joe McDonagh Cup: 2024
- Christy Ring Cup: 2021
- National Hurling League Division 2A: 2021, 2023
