= Christy Ring Cup =

Annual hurling competition in Ireland

- Founded: 2005–present
- Country: Ireland (5 counties); England (1 county); United States (1 county)
- Number of clubs: 7
- Level on pyramid: 3
- Promotion to: Joe McDonagh Cup
- Relegation to: Nicky Rackard Cup
- Current champions: Derry (2026)
- Most championships: Kildare (5 titles)
- Broadcaster(s): TG4
- Website: Official GAA site
- Current: 2026 Christy Ring Cup

The Christy Ring Cup (Irish: Corn Chriostóir Uí Rinn) is an annual hurling competition organised by the Gaelic Athletic Association. The cup forms the third-tier of Hurling for senior county teams (the All-Ireland Senior Hurling Championship is the first-tier trophy). It is contested by the seven county teams ranked 18–24 in the All-Ireland Senior Hurling Championship. Each year, the champions of the Christy Ring Cup are promoted to the Joe McDonagh Cup, and the lowest finishing team is relegated to the Nicky Rackard Cup. The competition is named in honour of Christy Ring, a legendary player from Cork.

The Christy Ring Cup, which was introduced in 2005, replaced the All-Ireland B Hurling Championship (1974-2004). Originally introduced as a second-tier competition, it is currently the third tier overall in the inter-county hurling championship system. Between 2005 and 2017 the Christy Ring Cup was the second tier hurling championship. With the introduction of the Joe McDonagh Cup, the Christy Ring Cup is the highest tier of the championship system without entry to that year's All-Ireland finals series (the top two teams in the Joe McDonagh Cup usually gain entry to preliminary quarter-finals of the All-Ireland Senior Hurling Championship).

Wicklow holds the most appearances in the Christy Ring Cup. They have appeared in 21 seasons of the cup. Down and Kildare had appeared in every season until 2021, when they participated in the Joe McDonagh Cup.

The title has been won by 10 different counties, 6 of whom have won the title more than once. The all-time record-holders are Kildare, who have won the cup on 5 occasions. Derry are the title-holders, defeating Kerry by 3-24 to 3-19 in the 2026 final.

== History ==
=== Creation ===
In 2003 the Hurling Development Committee (HDC) was charged with restructuring the entire hurling championship. The committee was composed of chairman Pat Dunny (Kildare), Liam Griffin (Wexford), P. J. O'Grady (Limerick), Ger Loughnane (Clare), Cyril Farrell (Galway), Jimmy O'Reilly (Down), Willie Ring (Cork), Pat Daly (GAA Games Development Officer) and Nicky English (Tipperary). Over the course of three months they held discussions with managers, players and officials, while also taking a submission from the Gaelic Players Association. The basic tenet of the proposals was to structure the hurling championship into three tiers in accordance with 2004 National Hurling League status. The top tier was confined to 12 teams, while the next ten teams would contest the second tier which was to be known as the Christy Ring Cup. There would also be promotion-relegation play-offs between the three championship tiers. The HDC also suggested that these games would be played as curtain raisers to All-Ireland quarter-finals and semi-finals.

The proposal were accepted at the 2004 GAA Congress. The Christy Ring Cup and the Nicky Rackard Cup competitions were launched at Croke Park on 8 December 2004.

=== Format history ===
==== 2005–2007 ====
The ten participating teams were divided into two groups of five and played in a round-robin format. Each team was guaranteed at least four games each. The eventual group winners and runners-up qualified for the knock-out semi-finals of the competition.

The bottom two teams of both groups were involved in a four-way relegation play-off with the eventual loser being relegated to the Nicky Rackard Cup. In 2006 the relegation play-off was limited to just the bottom teams in both groups, while in 2007 there was no relegation.

==== 2008 ====
The competition was expanded to include twelve teams. The participating teams were divided into four groups of three and played in a round-robin format, thus limiting each team to just two games each. The eventual group winners and runners-up qualified for the knock-out quarter-finals of the competition.

The bottom team in each group went into the relegation play-offs. The eventual losers were relegated to the Nicky Rackard Cup, however, the relegation play-offs in 2008 were rendered meaningless as all four bottom-placed teams were relegated.

==== 2009–2017 ====
In 2009 a double elimination format was introduced, thus guaranteeing each team at least two games before being eliminated from the competition.

The eight teams play four Round 1 matches.

- The winners in Round 1 advance to Round 2A.
- The losers in Round 1 go into Round 2B.

There are two Round 2A matches.

- The winners in Round 2A advance to the semi-finals.
- The losers in Round 2A go into the quarter-finals.

There are two Round 2B matches.

- The winners in Round 2B advance to the quarter-finals.
- The losers in Round 2B go into the bottom playoff. The losers of this match play a relegation/promotion match with the winners of the Nicky Rackard Cup. If they lose they are relegated to the Nicky Rackard cup for the following year.

There are two quarter-final matches between the Round 2A losers and Round 2B winners.

- The winners of the quarter-finals advance to the semi-finals.
- The losers of the quarter-finals are eliminated.

There are two semi-final matches between the Round 2A winners and the quarter-final winners.

- The winners of the semi-finals advance to the final.
- The losers of the semi-finals are eliminated.

The winners of the final (with the exception of Down in 2013, are promoted to the Liam MacCarthy Cup for the following year.

==== From 2018 ====
2018 saw the reintroduction of a group phase format to all tiers of the hurling Championship structure. The eight participating teams are divided into two groups of four and will play in a round-robin format. Each team will be guaranteed at least three games each. The eventual group winners and runners-up will qualify for the knock-out semi-finals of the championship.

==== 2020 and the coronavirus pandemic ====
The Coronavirus pandemic in 2020 significantly affected the GAA season, with the Christy Ring Cup reverting for one season only to the partial double elimination format that existed until 2017.

== Format ==
=== Development ===
In 2017, the majority delegates voted to restructure the championship once again. The new format led to the introduction of the round robin within the championship and the creation of the Joe McDonagh Cup, making the Christy Ring Cup the third tier in the championship.

=== Group stage ===
Group stage: There are six teams in the Cup. During the course of a season (from May to June) each team plays the others once (a single round-robin system) for a total of five games. Teams receive two points for a win and one point for a draw. No points are awarded for a loss. Teams are ranked by total points. The top two teams in the group contest the Christy Ring Cup final. The third, fourth and fifth-placed teams are eliminated from the championship and the 6th-placed team is relegated to the Nicky Rackard Cup.

==== Tie-breakers ====
In the event of teams finishing on equal points, the tie shall be decided by the following means (in the order specified):

- Where two teams only are involved – the outcome of the meeting of the two teams
- Score difference – subtracting the total "Scores Against" from the total "Scores For"
- Highest Total "Score For"
- Highest Total "Goals For"
- A Play-Off

=== Knockout stage ===
Final: The top two teams in the group stage contest the final. The winning team are declared champions.

The Christy Ring Cup is the highest tier in hurling competitions that does not provide a direct entry route to that year's All-Ireland Senior Hurling Championship. To do so, the counties have to get promoted to at least the McDonagh Cup (tier 2).

=== Promotion ===
At the end of the championship, the winning team is promoted to the Joe McDonagh Cup for the following season.

=== Relegation ===
The bottom team in the Christy Ring group stage is relegated to the fourth-tier Nicky Rackard Cup for the following year, being replaced by the champions of the Nicky Rackard Cup for that year.

=== Group Stage table and positional qualification ===
Team	Qualification
1st in Group	Advance to final, where the winner is promoted to the Joe McDonagh Cup
2nd in Group	Advance to final, where the winner is promoted to the Joe McDonagh Cup
3rd in Group	Will contest next seasons Christy Ring Cup
4th in Group	Will contest next seasons Christy Ring Cup
5th in Group	Will contest next seasons Christy Ring Cup
6th in Group	Relegated to Nicky Rackard Cup

== Teams ==
=== 2027 teams ===
Seven counties will compete in the 2027 Christy Ring Cup, with London relegated from the Joe McDonagh Cup and New York promoted from the Nicky Rackard Cup:

County	Location	Stadium	Province	Position in 2026 Championship	First year in Championship	In Championship Since	Championship Titles	Last Championship Title
Donegal	Ballybofey	MacCumhaill Park	Ulster	5th	2019	2025	0	—
Kerry	Tralee	Austin Stack Park	Munster	Runners-up	2005	2026	2	2015
London	Ruislip	McGovern Park	Britain	Relegated from Joe McDonagh Cup	2006	2027	2	2025
Meath	Navan	Páirc Tailteann	Leinster	3rd	2005	2025	3	2023
New York	Bronx	Gaelic Park	North America	Nicky Rackard Cup champions	2027	2027	0	—
Roscommon	Roscommon	Dr Hyde Park	Connacht	6th	2005	2026	0	—
Wicklow	Aughrim	Aughrim County Ground	Leinster	4th	2005	2024	0	—

=== Participation by province ===
Province	No.	County	No.	Years participated
Leinster	6	Wicklow	22	2005-2022, 2024-
Leinster	6	Kildare	18	2005-2020, 2022, 2024
Leinster	6	Meath	17	2005-2008, 2010-2016, 2019, 2023, 2025-
Leinster	6	Carlow	6	2005-2009, 2017
Leinster	6	Westmeath	5	2005, 2007-2010
Leinster	6	Offaly	2	2020, 2021
Ulster	6	Derry	20	2005, 2007-2016, 2018-2026
Ulster	6	Down	16	2005-2020
Ulster	6	Armagh	5	2008, 2011, 2013, 2014, 2018
Ulster	6	Donegal	4	2019, 2025-
Ulster	6	Antrim	3	2006, 2016, 2017
Ulster	6	Tyrone	3	2023-2025
Connacht	3	Mayo	15	2005-2015, 2017, 2018, 2022, 2023
Connacht	3	Roscommon	11	2005, 2006, 2008, 2016-2021, 2026-
Connacht	3	Sligo	5	2020-2024
Britain	1	London	14	2006-2008, 2012, 2015-2019, 2022-2025, 2027
Munster	1	Kerry	13	2005-2015, 2026-
North America	1	New York	1	2027

=== Relegated teams ===
Year	No.	Teams
2026	1	—
2025	1	Tyrone
2024	1	Sligo
2023	1	Mayo
2022	1	Wicklow
2021	1	Roscommon
2020	0	—
2019	1	Donegal
2018	2	Armagh, Mayo
2017	1	Roscommon
2016	1	Derry
2015	1	Mayo
2014	0	—
2013	0	—
2012	0	—
2011	1	Armagh
2010	0	—
2009	0	—
2008	4	Armagh, London, Meath, Roscommon
2007	0	—
2006	1	Roscommon
2005	1	Derry

== Venues ==
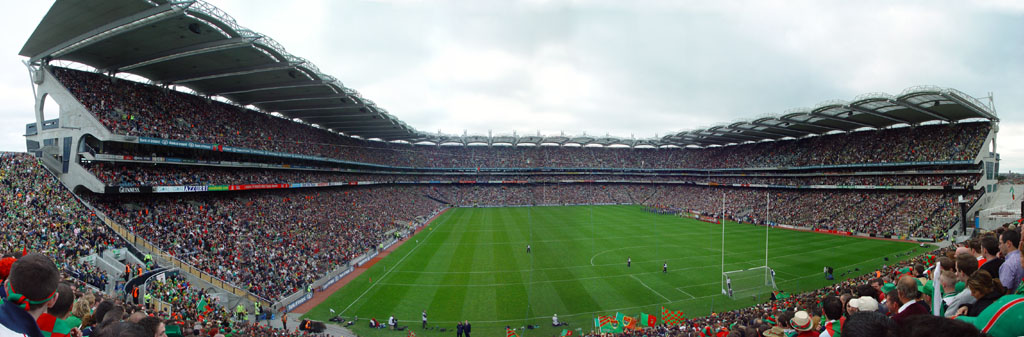
Croke Park in Dublin, hosted the 2022 Christy Ring Cup final.

=== Group stage ===
Fixtures in the five group stage rounds of the cup are played at the home ground of one of the two teams. Each team is guaranteed at least two home games. During the inaugural staging of the competition some teams had three home games.

=== Final ===
The Christy Ring Cup final is played at Croke Park.

== Managers ==
=== Winning managers (2016–present) ===
#	Manager(s)	Winning team(s)	Titles(s)	Winning years
1	David Herity	Kildare	2	2020, 2022
2	Martin Ennis	Meath	1	2016
2	Colm Bonnar	Carlow	1	2017
2	Joe Quaid	Kildare	1	2018
2	TBD	Meath	1	2019
2	Michael Fennelly	Offaly	1	2021
2	Seoirse Bulfin	Meath	1	2023
2	Brian Dowling	Kildare	1	2024

== Trophy and medals ==
At the end of the cup final, the winning team are presented with a trophy. The Christy Ring Cup is held by the winning team until the following year's final. The presentation is made at a special rostrum in the Ard Chomairle section of the Hogan Stand where GAA and political dignitaries and special guests view the match.

The cup is decorated with ribbons in the colours of the winning team. During the game the cup has both teams' sets of ribbons attached and the runners-up ribbons are removed before the presentation. The winning captain accepts the cup on behalf of his team before giving a short speech. Individual members of the winning team then have an opportunity to come to the rostrum to lift the cup.

The cup is named after Christy Ring. He was an eight time All-Ireland medal winner with Cork whose inter county career spanned twenty-four years from 1939 to 1963. Ring, who died in 1979, is widely regarded as one of the greatest hurlers in the history of the game, with many former players, commentators and fans rating him as the number one player of all time.

The winning team is presented with a set of gold medals.

== List of finals ==
=== List of Christy Ring Cup finals ===
Year	Date	Winners		Runners-Up		Venue	Captains		Winning Margin	Referee
Year	Date	County	Score	County	Score	Venue	Winning captain	Losing captain	Winning Margin	Referee
2026	30 May	Derry	3-24 (33)	Kerry	3-19 (28)	Croke Park	Cormac O'Doherty	James O'Connor	5	Matthew Farrell (Offaly)
2025	31 May	London	1-27 (30)	Derry	1-24 (27)	Croke Park	Sean Glynn	Cormac O'Doherty	3	Padraig Dunne (Laois)
2024	2 June	Kildare	4-21 (33)	Derry	1-22 (25)	Croke Park	Paddy McKenna	Cormac O'Doherty	8	Brian Keon (Galway)
2023	3 June	Meath	1-23 (26)	Derry	1-21 (24)	Croke Park	Charlie Ennis & Jack Regan	Cormac O'Doherty	2	Kevin Jordan (Tipperary)
2022	21 May	Kildare	2-29 (35)	Mayo	0-19 (19)	Croke Park	Brian Byrne	Shane Boland	16	Michael Kennedy (Tipperary)
2021	1 August	Offaly	0-41 (41)	Derry	2-14 (20)	Croke Park	Ben Conneely	Cormac O'Doherty	21	Thomas Gleeson (Dublin)
2020	22 November	Kildare	3-16 (25)	Down	0-22 (22)	Croke Park	Brian Byrne	Stephen Keith	3	Chris Mooney (Dublin)
2019	22 June	Meath	4-19 (31)	Down	2-15 (21)	Croke Park	Seán Geraghty	Stephen Keith	10	Sean Stack (Dublin)
2018	23 June	Kildare	3-19 (28)	London	1-11 (14)	Croke Park	Brian Byrne	Liam Gavaghan	14	Patrick Murphy (Carlow)
2017	10 June	Carlow	5-23 (38)	Antrim	4-15 (27)	Croke Park	Marty Kavanagh	Conor Carson	11	Mick Murtagh (Westmeath)
2016	4 June	Meath	2-17 (23); 4-21 (33)	Antrim	1-20 (23); 5-17 (32)	Croke Park	James Toher	Neal McAuley	1	Cathal McAllister (Cork)
2015	6 June	Kerry	1-20 (23)	Derry	0-12 (12)	Croke Park	John Griffin	Seán MacCullagh	11	John Keane (Galway)
2014	7 June	Kildare	4-18 (30)	Kerry	2-22 (28)	Croke Park	Niall Ó Muineacháin	John Egan	2	Seán Cleere (Kilkenny)
2013	8 June	Down	3-16 (25)	Kerry	2-17 (23)	Croke Park	Paul Braniff	Paud Costello	2	Christopher Browne (Galway)
2012	9 June	London	4-18 (30)	Wicklow	1-17 (20)	Croke Park	Colm Quinn	Enan Glynn	10	Kevin Brady (Louth)
2011	4 June	Kerry	2-21 (27)	Wicklow	2-08 (14)	Croke Park	Mikey Boyle	Jonathan O'Neill	13	Garrett Duffy (Antrim)
2010	3 July	Westmeath	2-16 (22)	Kerry	1-18 (21)	Croke Park	Andrew Mitchell	Colin Harris	1	Tony Carroll (Offaly)
2009	11 July	Carlow	1-15 (18)	Down	0-14 (14)	Croke Park	Mark Brennan	Graham Clarke	4	Tommy Ryan (Tipperary)
2008	3 August	Carlow	3-22 (31)	Westmeath	4-16 (28)	O'Connor Park	Edward Coady	Brendan Murtagh	3	Noel Cosgrove (Tipperary)
2007	5 August	Westmeath	2-15 (21)	Kildare	0-13 (13)	Croke Park	Darren McCormack	Colm Buggy	8	John Sexton (Cork)
2006	6 August	Antrim	5-13 (28)	Carlow	1-07 (10)	Croke Park	Karl McKeegan	Robbie Foley	18	James McGrath (Westmeath)
2005	14 August	Westmeath	1-23 (26)	Down	2-18 (24)	Croke Park	John Shaw	Simon Wilson	2	Denis Richardson (Limerick)

== Roll of honour ==
=== Performance by county ===
County	Titles	Runners-up	Years won	Years runner-up
Kildare	5	1	2014, 2018, 2020, 2022, 2024	2007
Westmeath	3	1	2005, 2007, 2010	2008
Carlow	3	1	2008, 2009, 2017	2006
Meath	3	0	2016, 2019, 2023	—
Kerry	2	4	2011, 2015	2010, 2013, 2014, 2026
London	2	1	2012, 2025	2018
Derry	1	5	2026	2015, 2021, 2023, 2024, 2025
Down	1	4	2013	2005, 2009, 2019, 2020
Antrim	1	2	2006	2016, 2017
Offaly	1	0	2021	—
Wicklow	0	2	—	2011, 2012
Mayo	0	1	—	2022

=== Performance by province ===
Province	Titles	Runners-up	Total
Leinster	15	5	20
Ulster	3	11	14
Munster	2	4	6
Britain	2	1	3
Connacht	0	1	1

== Team records and statistics ==
=== Team results ===
Legend

- 1st – Champions
- 2nd – Runners-up
- 3rd/4th/5th/SF/QF/GS – Semi-finals/Quarter-finals/Group Stage
- GS/10th – Relegated
- AI – All-Ireland Senior Hurling Championship
- JM – Joe McDonagh Cup
- NR – Nicky Rackard Cup

For each year, the number of counties (in brackets) are shown.

Team	2005 (10)	2006 (10)	2007 (10)	2008 (12)	2009 (8)	2010 (8)	2011 (8)	2012 (8)	2013 (8)	2014 (8)	2015 (8)	2016 (8)	2017 (8)	2018 (8)	2019 (8)	2020 (7)	2021 (5)	2022 (6)	2023 (6)	2024 (6)	2025 (6)	2026 (6)	2027 (7)	Total
Antrim	AI	1st	AI	AI	AI	AI	AI	AI	AI	AI	AI	2nd	2nd	JM	JM	JM	AI	JM	AI	AI	AI	JM	JM	3
Armagh	NR	NR	NR	GS	NR	NR	R2	NR	R2	RPO	NR	NR	NR	GS	NR	NR	NR	NR	NR	NR	NR	NR	LM	5
Carlow	SF	2nd	SF	1st	1st	AI	AI	AI	AI	AI	AI	AI	1st	JM	AI	JM	JM	JM	JM	AI	JM	JM	AI / JM	6
Derry	RPO	NR	GS	SF	QF	R2	QF	QF	QF	QF	2nd	RPO	NR	SF	SF	R2	2nd	3rd	2nd	2nd	2nd	1st	JM	20
Donegal	NR	NR	NR	NR	LM	LM	LM	NR	NR	NR	NR	NR	NR	NR	RPO	NR	NR	NR	NR	NR	4th	5th		4
Down	2nd	SF	GS	QF	2nd	QF	SF	SF	1st	RPO	SF	SF	SF	GS	2nd	2nd	JM	JM	JM	JM	JM	JM	JM	16
Kerry	GS	RPO	GS	QF	SF	2nd	1st	R2	2nd	2nd	1st	AI	AI	JM	JM	JM	JM	JM	JM	JM	JM	2nd		13
Kildare	SF	SF	2nd	QF	QF	SF	SF	QF	SF	1st	SF	SF	QF	1st	GS	1st	JM	1st	JM	1st	JM	AI	JM	18
London	NR	GS	GS	GS	NR	NR	NR	1st	AI	AI	QF	QF	QF	2nd	RPO	—	—	4th	4th	3rd	1st	JM		14
Mayo	RPO	GS	GS	QF	SF	R2	R2	R2	R2	SF	RPO	NR	RPO	GS	NR	NR	NR	2nd	6th	NR	NR	NR	NR	15
Meath	GS	GS	SF	GS	NR	QF	QF	SF	SF	SF	QF	1st	AI	JM	1st	JM	JM	JM	1st	JM	5th	3rd		16
New York	—	—	—	—	—	—	—	—	—	—	—	—	—	—	—	—	—	—	—	—	LM	NR		1
Offaly	AI	AI	AI	AI	AI	AI	AI	AI	AI	AI	AI	AI	AI	AI	JM	SF	1st	JM	JM	JM	AI	AI	AI	2
Roscommon	RPO	RPO	NR	GS	NR	NR	NR	NR	NR	NR	NR	QF	RPO	GS	SF	SF	QF	NR	NR	NR	NR	6th		11
Sligo	NR	NR	NR	NR	NR	NR	NR	NR	NR	NR	LM	LM	LM	LM	NR	R2	SF	5th	3rd	6th	NR	NR	NR	5
Tyrone	NR	NR	NR	NR	LM	NR	LM	LM	NR	NR	NR	NR	NR	NR	NR	NR	NR	NR	5th	4th	6th	NR	NR	3
Westmeath	1st	AI	1st	2nd	RPO	1st	AI	AI	AI	AI	AI	AI	AI	JM	JM	JM	JM	AI	AI	JM	JM	JM	JM	5
Wicklow	RPO	GS	GS	SF	RPO	SF	2nd	2nd	QF	QF	RPO	RPO	SF	SF	GS	R2	SF	6th	NR	5th	3rd	4th		22

=== Debut of teams ===
Year	Debutants	Total
2005	Carlow, Derry, Down, Kerry, Kildare, Mayo, Meath, Roscommon, Westmeath, Wicklow	10
2006	Antrim, London	2
2007	None	0
2008	Armagh	1
2009–18	None	0
2019	Donegal	1
2020	Offaly, Sligo	2
2021–22	None	0
2023	Tyrone	1
2024–2026	None	0
2027	New York	1
**Total**		**18**

=== Seasons in Christy Ring Cup ===
The number of years that each county has played in the Christy Ring Cup between 2005 and 2027. A total of 18 counties have competed in at least one season of the Christy Ring Cup. Wicklow have participated in the most seasons. The counties in bold participate in the 2027 Christy Ring Cup.

Years	Counties
22	**Wicklow**
20	Derry
18	Kildare
16	Down, **Meath**
15	Mayo
14	**London**
13	**Kerry**
11	**Roscommon**
6	Carlow
5	Armagh, Sligo, Westmeath
4	**Donegal**
3	Antrim, Tyrone
2	Offaly
1	**New York**

=== List of Christy Ring Cup counties ===
Team	Appearances	Debut	Most recent	Championship titles	Last championship title	Best Christy Ring Cup result
Antrim	3	2006	2017	1	2006	**1st**
Armagh	5	2008	2018	0	—	Group Stage
Carlow	6	2005	2017	3	2017	**1st**
Derry	20	2005	2026	0	—	**1st**
Donegal	4	2019	2027	0	—	4th
Down	16	2005	2020	1	2013	**1st**
Kerry	13	2005	2027	2	2015	**1st**
Kildare	18	2005	2024	5	2024	**1st**
London	14	2006	2027	2	2025	**1st**
Mayo	15	2005	2023	0	—	2nd
Meath	16	2005	2027	3	2023	**1st**
New York	1	2027		0	—	—
Offaly	2	2020	2021	1	2021	**1st**
Roscommon	11	2005	2027	0	—	Semi-finals
Sligo	5	2020	2024	0	—	3rd
Tyrone	3	2023	2025	0	—	5th
Westmeath	5	2005	2010	3	2010	**1st**
Wicklow	22	2005	2027	0	—	2nd

=== All time table ===
Legend

Colours
Currently competing in the Leinster Senior Hurling Championship or the Joe McDonagh Cup
Currently competing in the Christy Ring Cup
Currently competing in the Nicky Rackard Cup or the Lory Meagher Cup

As of 1 June 2026 (After 2026 Cup).

#	Team	Pld	W	D	L	Points
1	Kildare	78	52	2	24	106
2	Derry	82	38	3	41	79
3	Meath	62	36	5	21	77
4	Down	65	36	3	26	75
5	Wicklow	79	32	4	43	68
6	Kerry	49	29	2	18	60
7	London	58	26	3	29	55
8	Carlow	31	22	2	7	46
9	Westmeath	25	18	1	6	37
10	Mayo	54	14	0	40	28
11	Antrim	15	11	1	3	23
12	Roscommon	42	9	1	32	19
13	Sligo	20	5	0	15	10
14	Offaly	6	4	1	1	9
15	Donegal	14	3	1	10	7
16	Tyrone	15	3	1	11	7
17	Armagh	13	1	0	12	2
18	New York	0	0	0	0	0

== Player records ==
=== Top scorers overall ===
Year	Player	County	Score	Total
2005	Mattie Dowd	Kildare	2-39	45
2006	Paul Braniff	Down	6-26	44
2007	Shane Brick	Kerry		
2008	Brendan Murtagh	Westmeath	2-37	43
2009	Shane Brick	Kerry	1-42	45
2010	Darragh O'Connell	Kerry	1-38	41
2011	Darragh O'Connell	Kerry	1-33	36
2012	Martin Finn	London	5-29	44
2013	Paul Braniff	Down	3-34	43
2014	Mikey Lee	Wicklow	4-38	50
2015	Shane Nolan	Kerry	2-35	41
2016	Ciarán Clarke	Antrim	3-43	52
2017	Denis Murphy	Carlow	0-45	45
2018				
2019				
2020				
2021	Eoghan Cahill	Offaly	0-36	36
2022	Shane Boland	Mayo	1-52	55
2023				
2024	Jack Goulding	London	5-50	65

=== Top scorers in the final ===
Year	Player	County	Score	Total
2005	Andrew Mitchell	Westmeath	0–09	9
2006	Johnny McIntosh	Antrim	2–04	10
2007	Billy White	Kildare	0–07	7
2008	Brendan Murtagh	Westmeath	2–10	16
2009	Simon Wilson	Down	0–07	7
2010	Darragh O'Connell	Kerry	0–08	8
2011	Darragh O'Connell	Kerry	1–09	12
2012	Jonathan Maher	London	3–04	13
2013	Shane Nolan	Kerry	1–09	12
2014	Shane Nolan	Kerry	1–04	7
2014	Gerry Keegan	Kildare	1–04	7
2015	Shane Nolan	Kerry	1–08	11
2016	James Toher	Meath	0–12	12
2017	Ciarán Clarke	Antrim	2–09	15
2018	James Burke	Kildare	0–08	8
2019	Paul Sheehan	Down	1–08	11
2020	O. McManus	Down	0–09	9
2021	Eoghan Cahill	Offaly	0–13	13
2022	James Burke	Kildare	0–11	11
2023	Cormac O'Doherty	Derry	1–14	17
2024	Cormac O'Doherty	Derry	1–11	14

=== Winning captains ===
Winning Captain	County	Title(s)	Year(s)
Brian Byrne	Kildare	3	2018, 2020, 2022
John Shaw	Westmeath	1	2005
Karl McKeegan	Antrim	1	2006
Darren McCormack	Westmeath	1	2007
Edward Coady	Carlow	1	2008
Mark Brennan	Carlow	1	2009
Andrew Mitchell	Westmeath	1	2010
Mikey Boyle	Kerry	1	2011
Colm Quinn	London	1	2012
Paul Braniff	Down	1	2013
Niall Ó Muineacháin	Kildare	1	2014
John Griffin	Kerry	1	2015
James Toher	Meath	1	2016
Marty Kavanagh	Carlow	1	2017
Seán Geraghty	Meath	1	2019
Ben Conneely	Offaly	1	2021
Jack Regan / Charlie Ennis	Meath	1	2023
Paddy McKenna	Kildare	1	2024

== See also ==
- Christy Ring Cup records and statistics
- Christy Ring Cup Champion 15 Awards
- All-Ireland Senior Hurling Championship (Tier 1)
- Joe McDonagh Cup (Tier 2)
- Nicky Rackard Cup (Tier 4)
- Lory Meagher Cup (Tier 5)
