= Andrew Mitchell (hurler) =

Irish hurler (born 1980)

Personal information
- Native name: Aindriú Mistéil (Irish)
- Born: 1980 (age 45–46) Clonkill, County Westmeath, Ireland

Sport
- Sport: Hurling
- Position: Centre-back
Club
- Years: Club
- 1998-present: Clonkill
Club titles
- Westmeath titles: 3
Inter-county
- Years: County
- 2000-present: Westmeath
Inter-county titles
- Leinster titles: 0
- All-Irelands: 0
- NHL: 0
- All Stars: 0

Andrew Mitchell (born 1980 in Clonkill, County Westmeath, Ireland) is an Irish sportsperson. He plays hurling with his local club Clonkill and has been a member of the Westmeath senior inter-county team since 2000.

Sporting positions
Preceded by Paul Greville	Westmeath Senior Hurling Captain; 2010	Succeeded by Eoin Price
Achievements
Preceded by Mark Brennan (Carlow)	Christy Ring Cup Final winning captain 2010	Succeeded by Mikey Boyle (Kerry)
