= Gareth Johnson (hurler) =

Down hurler

Personal information
- Nickname: Magic
- Born: County Down, Northern Ireland
- Height: 6 ft 5 in (196 cm)

Sport
- Football Position: Left Half-Forward
- Hurling Position: Full Forward
Clubs
- Years: Club
- 1999–: Ballygalget; Loughinisland
Club titles
- Down titles: 7
- Ulster titles: 1
Inter-county
- Years: County
- 2003–2017 2007–2009: Down'; Down
Inter-county titles
	Football	Hurling
Ulster Titles	0	2
All-Ireland Titles	0	0
League titles	0	1
All-Stars	0	0

Gareth Johnson is an Irish sportsman. He plays hurling with his local club Ballygalget and football for Loughinisland and has been a member of the Down senior inter-county hurling and football teams. Born in Ballygalget, County Down, Johnson scored an injury-time goal in the 2013 Christy Ring Cup final to win it for Down for the first time in a 3–16 to 2–17 victory against Kerry.

== Honours ==
Down

- Ulster Under-21 Hurling Championship (2): 2003, 2004
- National Hurling League Division 2 (1): 2004
- Christy Ring Cup (1): 2013

Club

- Down Senior Hurling Championship (7): 1999, 2003, 2004, 2005, 2007, 2008, 2010
- Ulster Senior Club Hurling Championship (1): 2005
