= Paul Greville =

Westmeath hurler and Gaelic footballer

Personal information
- Born: 1984 or 1985 (age 40–41) County Westmeath

Sport
Clubs
Years	Club	Apps (scores)
? ? 2020–	Killucan; Raharney; Derrytresk	? ? ?
Club titles
	Football	Hurling
Westmeath titles	0	3
Inter-county
- Years: County
- 2010–2015 2004–2019: Westmeath (H); Westmeath (F)
Inter-county titles
	Football	Hurling
Leinster Titles	0	0
All-Ireland Titles	0	3 (Christy Ring)
League titles	1 (div 2)	1 (div 2)
All-Stars	0	0

Paul Greville (born 1984/1985) is an Irish former dual player from County Westmeath.

== Playing career ==
=== Club ===
Greville played club football with Killucan, winning the 2005 Westmeath Intermediate Football Championship, and club hurling with Raharney, winning Westmeath Senior Hurling Championship titles in 2006, 2008 and 2010.

In mid-2020, Greville moved to Tyrone GAA club Derrytresk.

Greville also signed for Naomh Colum Cille, a hurling team in Tyrone, and won the 2021 Tyrone Junior Hurling Championship, scoring 0–4 from play in the final vs Omagh St Enda's.

=== Inter-county ===
Greville played both Gaelic football and hurling with Westmeath GAA, and was part of the teams that won the Christy Ring Cup in 2005 and 2007.

He won both National Hurling League and National Football League medals while playing for Westmeath.

Greville made a half-time substitute appearance for Westmeath in the 2015 Leinster Senior Football Championship final.

He retired from inter-county hurling in November 2019, and took up a role in the backroom management team of newly appointed Shane O'Brien.
