= Simon Wilson (hurler) =

Irish hurler

Simon Wilson is a former hurler for Down County.
