= 2011 Christy Ring Cup final =

Hurling decider

- Event: 2011 Christy Ring Cup
Kerry	Wicklow
2-21	2-8
- Date: 4 June 2011
- Venue: Croke Park, Dublin
- Referee: Garrett Duffy (Antrim)

The 2011 Christy Ring Cup final was a hurling match played at Croke Park on 4 June 2011 to determine the winners of the 2011 Christy Ring Cup, the 7th season of the Christy Ring Cup, a tournament organised by the Gaelic Athletic Association for the second tier hurling teams. The final was contested by Kerry of Munster and Wicklow of Leinster, with Kerry winning by 2-21 to 2-8.

The Christy Ring Cup final between Kerry and Wicklow was the third championship meeting between the two teams, with both sides claiming a victory each and one draw. Kerry were appearing in their second consecutive cup final, however, they had yet to claim the title. Wicklow were appearing in their first decider.

Kerry won the game by 2-21 to 2-8.

Kerry's Christy Ring Cup victory was their first ever. They became the fourth team to win the Christy Ring Cup. They remain one of only two teams to have won the All-Ireland title and the Christy Ring Cup.

Wicklow's Christy Ring Cup defeat was the first of consecutive cup final defeats. They remain a team who has contested cup finals but has never claimed the ultimate prize.

== Match ==
=== Details ===
4 June 2011

Kerry	2-21 - 2-8	Wicklow
D O'Connell 1-9 (4f, 1 '65'), S Nolan 0-5, J Egan 1-1, M Conway 0-2, J Griffin, M Boyle, G O'Brien, J Flaherty 0-1 each.		J O'Neill 1-4 (3f, 1 '65'), J Quirke 1-1, A O'Brien 0-2, D Hyland 0-1.

Croke Park, Dublin
Referee: G Duffy (Antrim)

Kerry	Wicklow
