= David Herity =

Kilkenny hurler (born 1983)

Personal information
- Native name: Daithí Ó hAghartaigh (Irish)
- Born: 12 April 1983 (age 43) Dunnamaggin, County Kilkenny, Ireland
- Occupation: Primary school teacher
- Height: 6 ft 0 in (183 cm)

Sport
- Sport: Hurling
- Position: Goalkeeper
Clubs
- Years: Club
- Dunnamaggin; Kilmoganny
Club titles
	Football	Hurling
Kilkenny titles	0	0
Inter-county*
Years	County	Apps (scores)
2003–2014	Kilkenny	13 (0–0)
Inter-county titles
- Leinster titles: 5
- All-Irelands: 5
- NHL: 5
- All Stars: 0
- *Inter County team apps and scores correct as of 18:13, 30 September 2012.

David Herity (born 12 April 1983) is an Irish hurling manager and former dual player of hurling and Gaelic football.

Herity played for Kilkenny Championship club Dunnamaggin and was a member of the Kilkenny senior hurling team for eight seasons, during which time he lined out as a goalkeeper. He began his hurling career at club level with Dunnamaggin. He broke onto the club's top adult team as a 17-year-old in 2000, having his greatest success that year when the club won the Kilkenny Intermediate Championship title. Herity also played Gaelic football with the Kilmoganny club.

At inter-county level, Herity was part of the Kilkenny minor team that won Leinster Minor Hurling Championship (MHC) titles in 1999 and 2001 before later winning back-to-back All-Ireland Under-21 Hurling Championship titles with the under-21 team in 2003 and 2004. He joined the Kilkenny senior team in 2003. Herity subsequently established himself as the team's first-choice goalkeeper and made a combined total of 30 National League and Championship appearances in a career that ended with his last game in 2014. During that time he was part of five All-Ireland Senior Hurling Championship-winning teams: 2008, 2009, 2011, 2012 and 2014. Herity also secured five Leinster Senior Hurling Championship medals and five National Hurling League medals. He announced his retirement from inter-county hurling on 24 November 2014.

After retiring as an inter-county player, Herity was appointed manager of the Kildare senior hurling team.

== Playing career ==
=== Club ===
Herity plays for the local Dunnamaggin club. He won a Leinster senior club league title in 2009.

=== Minor and under-21 ===
Herity first played for Kilkenny in 1999 when he joined the minor side. He won his first Leinster MHC medal that year following a 2–13 to 1–11 defeat of Wexford.

Two years later Herity was still eligible for the minor grade. He collected a second Leinster medal that year following another defeat of Wexford, this time by a scoreline of 3–16 to 1–9.

By 2003 Herity was a key member of the Kilkenny under-21 team. He won his first Leinster U21HC medal that year following a 0–12 to 1–4 defeat of Dublin. Kilkenny later faced Galway in the All-Ireland U21HC decider. Galway struggled in attack and conceded a goal a minute into the second half. The 2–13 to 0–12 scoreline gave Herity his first All-Ireland medal in the grade.

Herity collected a second Leinster U21HC medal in 2004, defeating Wexford again, this time by a scoreline of 0–16 to 2–3. The subsequent All-Ireland U21HC final against Tipperary saw Kilkenny scoring key goals early in the opening half, which helped them to a 3–21 to 1–6 victory.

=== Senior ===
While still a member of the under-21 team in 2003, Herity joined the senior team as a member of the extended league panel. He won a National Hurling League medal as a non-playing substitute that year following Kilkenny's 5–14 to 5–13 extra-time defeat of Tipperary.

After several years away from the team, Herity returned as third-choice goalkeeper in 2008. He won a set of Leinster SHC and All-Ireland SHC medals as a non-playing substitute that year, before collecting another set the following year. Herity added a third Leinster SHC medal to his collection in 2010, once again as an unused substitute.

In 2011, Herity succeeded P. J. Ryan as Kilkenny's first-choice goalkeeper for the championship campaign. A 4–17 to 1–15 defeat of Dublin gave Kilkenny a record-equalling seventh successive championship. It was Herity's first winners' medal on the field of play. Kilkenny subsequently faced Tipperary in the 2011 All-Ireland SHC decider on 4 September. Goals by Michael Fennelly and Richie Hogan in either half gave Kilkenny, who many viewed as underdog ahead of the game, a 2–17 to 1–16 victory. Herity collected his first All-Ireland medal as a full member of the team.

2012 began well for Herity when he collected a second National League medal on the field of play following a 3–21 to 0–16 demolition of old rivals Cork. Kilkenny were later shocked by Galway in the Leinster SHC decider, losing by 2–21 to 2–11; however, both sides subsequently met in the 2012 All-Ireland SHC decider on 9 September. Kilkenny led going into the final stretch; however, Joe Canning struck a stoppage time equaliser to level the game at 2–13 to 0–19 and send the final to a replay for the first time since 1959. The replay took place three weeks later on 30 September 2012. Galway stunned the reigning champions with two first-half goals; however, Kilkenny's championship debutant Walter Walsh gave a man of the match performance, claiming a haul of 1–3. This 3–22 to 3–11 Kilkenny victory gave Herity a second All-Ireland SHC medal.

After impressing as a goalkeeper during several games in the 2013 National League campaign, Eoin Murphy succeeded in supplanting Herity as first-choice goalkeeper.

Herity was confined to the substitutes' bench once again in 2014; however, an elbow injury to Murphy saw Herity being restored as first-choice goalkeeper for the latter stages of the provincial championship. He subsequently secured a second Leinster SHC medal, as a dominant display gave Kilkenny a 0–14 to 1–9 victory over Dublin. Herity made way for Murphy during the subsequent All-Ireland SHC final and replay; however, he collected a fifth All-Ireland SHC medal overall, his third as a non-playing substitute, following a 2–17 to 2–14 defeat of Tipperary in the decider.

=== Inter-provincial ===
Herity lined out for Leinster in the Interprovincial Championship. He secured a winners' medal in this competition in 2012 following a 2–19 to 1–15 defeat of Connacht.

== Managerial career ==
Herity became manager of the Kildare hurling team in 2018. That team won the 2020 Christy Ring Cup under his leadership. Herity had previously managed the Dublin camogie team, but quit after two years.

Herity was named as goalkeeping coach for Tipperary ahead of the 2024 season.

== Career statistics ==
=== Inter-county ===
Team	Year	National League			Leinster		All-Ireland		Total	
Team	Year	Division	Apps	Score	Apps	Score	Apps	Score	Apps	Score
Kilkenny	2003	Division 1A	0	0-00	—		—		0	0-00
Kilkenny	2004	Division 1A	—		—		—		—	
Kilkenny	2005	Division 1	—		—		—		—	
Kilkenny	2006	Division 1	—		—		—		—	
Kilkenny	2007	Division 1	—		—		—		—	
Kilkenny	2008	Division 1	0	0-00	0	0-00	0	0-00	0	0-00
Kilkenny	2009	Division 1	3	0-00	0	0-00	0	0-00	3	0-00
Kilkenny	2010	Division 1	1	0-00	0	0-00	0	0-00	1	0-00
Kilkenny	2011	Division 1	5	0-00	2	0-00	2	0-00	9	0-00
Kilkenny	2012	Division 1A	5	0-00	2	0-00	4	0-00	11	0-00
Kilkenny	2013	Division 1A	1	0-00	0	0-00	0	0-00	1	0-00
Kilkenny	2014	Division 1A	3	0-00	1	0-00	1	0-00	5	0-00
Total			18	0-00	5	0-00	7	0-00	30	0-00

== Honours ==
=== As player ===
Kilkenny

- All-Ireland Senior Hurling Championship (5): 2008 (sub), 2009 (sub), 2011, 2012, 2014 (sub)
- Leinster Senior Hurling Championship (5): 2008 (sub), 2009 (sub), 2010 (sub), 2011, 2014
- National Hurling League (5): 2003 (sub), 2009 (sub), 2012, 2013 (sub), 2014 (sub)
- All-Ireland Under-21 Hurling Championship (2): 2003, 2004
- Leinster Under-21 Hurling Championship (2): 2003, 2004
- Leinster Minor Hurling Championship (2): 1999, 2001

Leinster

- Railway Cup (1): 2012

=== As manager ===
Kildare

- Christy Ring Cup (1): 2020

Sporting positions
Preceded by Shane O'Brien	Dublin Senior Camogie Manager; 2016–2018	Succeeded by Frank Browne
Preceded by Joe Quaid	Kildare Senior Hurling Manager; 2018–2023	Succeeded by Brian Dowling
