= Paul Braniff (hurler) =

Down hurler

Personal information
- Native name: Pól Ó Brannuibh (Irish)
- Nickname: Douill
- Born: 1982 (age 43–44) Portaferry, County Down, Northern Ireland
- Height: 6 ft 0 in (183 cm)

Sport
- Sport: Hurling
- Position: Full-forward
Club
- Years: Club
- 1999–2019: Portaferry
Club titles
- Down titles: 6
- Ulster titles: 1
Inter-county
- Years: County
- 2000–2013: Down
Inter-county titles
- Ulster titles: 1 (Under-21)
- All-Irelands: 1 (Christy Ring)
- NHL: 1 (Division 2)

Paul Braniff (born 1982) is an Irish hurler who currently plays as a full-forward for the Down senior team.

== Playing career ==
Braniff made his first appearance for the team during the 2000 championship and has remained as a regular member of the team since then. Although he has won an Ulster medals at under-21 level, Braniff has enjoyed little success with the Down senior team. Braniff scored 3–9 in the National Hurling League Division 2 Final in 2004 where Down beat Westmeath 5–15 to 3–07. Braniff led Down to their first Christy Ring Cup in 2013 in a 3–16 to 2–17 over Kerry with a Gareth 'Magic' Johnson goal in injury-time goal won it for the Ardsmen.

At club level Braniff is a five-time county championship medalist with Portaferry.

== Career statistics ==
=== Club ===
Team	Year	Ulster		All-Ireland		Total	
Team	Year	Apps	Score	Apps	Score	Apps	Score
Portaferry	2000–01	1	0–5	0	0–0	1	0–5
Portaferry	2001–02	1	2–4	0	0–0	1	2–4
Portaferry	2002–03	1	0–1	0	0–0	1	0–1
Portaferry	2012–13	2	0–18	0	0–0	2	0–18
Portaferry	2014–15	2	0–12	1	0–9	3	0–21
Total		7	2–40	1	0–9	8	2–9

== Honours ==
Portaferry

- Down Senior Hurling Championship (6): 2000, 2001, 2002, 2006, 2012, 2014
- Down Minor Hurling Championship (3): 1997, 1998, 1999
- Ulster Senior Hurling Championship (1): 2014

Down

- Ulster Under-21 Hurling Championship (1): 2003 (c)
- National Hurling League Division 2 (1): 2004
- Christy Ring Cup (1): 2013 (c)

Individual

- Christy Ring Cup Champion 15 (3): 2010, 2011, 2012
