= James Burke (Kildare hurler) =

Irish hurler

Personal information
- Native name: Séamus de Búrca (Irish)
- Born: 1999 (age 26–27) Naas, County Kildare, Ireland

Sport
- Sport: Hurling
- Position: Centre-forward
Club
- Years: Club
- Naas
Inter-county
- Years: County
- 2018-: Kildare
Inter-county titles
- Leinster titles: 0
- All-Irelands: 0
- NHL: 0
- All Stars: 0

James Burke (born 1999) is an Irish hurler who plays as a left corner-forward for the Kildare senior team.

Burke made his debut on the inter-county scene at the age of sixteen when he was selected for the Kildare minor team as a dual player. He enjoyed two unsuccessful championship seasons in this grade. He made his senior debut with the Kildare senior team during the 2018 league.

== Career statistics ==
As of match played 10 March 2018.

Team	Year	National League			Christy Ring Cup		Total	
Team	Year	Division	Apps	Score	Apps	Score	Apps	Score
Kildare	2018	Division 2A	4	0-28	0	0-00	4	0-28
Total			4	0-28	0	0-00	4	0-28
