= John Shaw (hurler) =

Irish hurler

Personal information
- Born: 1982 (age 43–44) Raharney, County Westmeath, Ireland

Sport
- Sport: Hurling
- Position: Centre-Forward
Club
- Years: Club
- 1998–present: Raharney
Club titles
- Westmeath titles: 6
Inter-county
- Years: County
- 2000–2013: Westmeath
Inter-county titles
- Leinster titles: 0
- All-Irelands: 0
- NHL: 0
- All Stars: 0

John Shaw (born 1982 in Raharney, County Westmeath, Ireland) is an Irish sportsperson. He plays hurling with his local club Raharney and has been a member of the Westmeath senior inter-county team since 2000.

Sporting positions
Preceded by	Westmeath Senior Hurling Captain; 2005	Succeeded by
Achievements
Preceded by New competition	Christy Ring Cup Final winning captain 2005	Succeeded by Karl McKeegan (Antrim)
