= 2007 Christy Ring Cup =

- Teams: 10
- Champions: Westmeath (2nd title)
- Runners-up: Kildare

The 2007 Christy Ring Cup is the third edition of the Christy Ring Cup since its establishment by the Gaelic Athletic Association in 2005 and is the second-tier of Hurling for senior county teams (the All-Ireland Senior Hurling Championship is the first-tier trophy). It is contested by ten GAA county teams ranked 13–22 in the 2007 All-Ireland Senior Hurling Championship.

The 2007 Christy Ring Cup began on Saturday, 9 June 2007. The 2007 competition was won by Westmeath.

== Team changes ==
=== To Championship ===
Relegated from the All-Ireland Senior Hurling Championship

- Westmeath

Promoted from the Nicky Rackard Cup

- Derry

=== From Championship ===
Promoted to the All-Ireland Senior Hurling Championship

- Antrim

Relegated to the Nicky Rackard Cup

- Roscommon

== Teams ==
=== General Information ===
County	Last Cup title	Last Provincial title	Last All-Ireland title	Position in 2006 Championship	Appearance
Carlow	—	—	—	Runners-up	3rd
Derry	—	2001	—	Champions (Nicky Rackard Cup)	2nd
Down	—	1997	—	Semi-finals	3rd
Kerry	—	1891	1891	5th in Group B	3rd
Kildare	—	—	—	Semi-finals	3rd
London	—	—	1901	3rd in Group A	2nd
Mayo	—	1909	—	3rd in Group B	3rd
Meath	—	—	—	4th in Group A	3rd
Westmeath	2005	—	—	Lost relegation playoff (All-Ireland Senior Hurling Championship)	2nd
Wicklow	—	—	—	4th in Group B	3rd

=== Personnel and kits ===
County	Manager	Captain(s)	Sponsor

== Format ==
10 counties are contesting the 2007 competition for the Christy Ring Cup — the prize for the winners of Tier Two of the Guinness All-Ireland Hurling Championship. The 2007 competition involves the current middle rank of hurling counties:

- Leinster: Carlow, Kildare, Meath, Westmeath and Wicklow
- Ulster: Derry and Down
- Connacht: Mayo
- Munster: Kerry
- Britain: London

These 10 counties are divided into two groups of five and play in a round-robin format, guaranteeing at least four games each. The eventual group winners and runners-up will qualify for the semi-finals of the Christy Ring Cup. Unlike previous years the winners of this year Christy Ring Cup were not promoted to Tier One of the Hurling Championship to contest the Liam MacCarthy Cup the following year. This was decided by the GAA Congress in October 2006.

The last team in each group was involved in a relegation play-off with the eventual loser being relegated to the Nicky Rackard Cup.

== Group Stage ==
=== Group 2A ===
Teams	Pld	W	D	L	F	A	+/-	Pts	Qualification
Meath	4	3	1	0	6-80	5-51	+32	7	Advance to Knockout Stage
Westmeath	4	3	1	0	6-60	4-53	+13	7	Advance to Knockout Stage
Kerry	4	2	0	2	4-63	5-53	+7	4	
Down	4	1	0	3	7-57	7-66	-9	2	
Mayo	4	0	0	4	3-43	7-74	-43	0	Advance to Relegation Playoff

16 June 2007	Kerry	1-18 - 0-11	Mayo	Austin Stack Park
	S Brick 0-11, JM Dooley 1-1, J Egan 0-4, L Boyle 0-1, B O’Sullivan 0-1.		A Freeman 0-6, K Higgins 0-4, S Lenihan 0-1.	Referee: C McAllister (Cork)

16 June 2007	Meath	2-16 - 1-19	Westmeath	Páirc Tailteann
	G O’Neill 2-1, M Cole 0-7, E Brislane 0-3, S Clynch 0-2, E Keogh 0-1, C Keena 0-1, J Keena 0-1.		D McNicholas 1-2, A Mitchell 0-5, B Kennedy 0-5, E McLoughlin 0-3, R Whelan 0-3, B Smyth 0-1.	Referee: G Devlin (Armagh)

23 June 2007	Mayo	1-10 - 2-23	Meath	McHale Park
	A Freeman 0-5, E Fitzgerald (Meath) OG, K Healy 0-1, N Murphy 0-2, D Walsh, P Barrett 0-1 each.		M Cole 1-4, J Keena 0-6, S Clinch 1-3, G O'Neill, E Brislane 0-3 each, N Hackett 0-2, D Crimmins, E Keogh 0-1 each.

23 June 2007	Westmeath	2-13 - 1-15	Down	Cusack Park
	D Carty 1-3, D McNicholas 1-1, A Mitchell and J Shaw 0-3 each, R Whelan 0-2, E Loughlin 0-1.		C Courtney 1-6, B McGourty 0-3, G Johnston, G Clarke and E Trainor 0-2 each.

30 June 2007	Down	2-19 - 2-11	Mayo	McKenna Park
	B McGourty 1-6, G Johnson 0-6, S Wilson 0-4, P Coulter 1-0, S Murray, F Conway, C Coulter 0-1 each.	Report	A Freeman 0-5, N Murphy 0-3, P Broderick, K Healy 1-0 each, S Broderick 0-2, S Coyne 0-1.

30 June 2007	Meath	2-17 - 0-13	Kerry	Páirc Tailteann
	M Cole (5f), S Clynch, N Horan (3f) 0-5 each, G O'Neill 1-1, J Keena 1-0, E Brislane 0-1.	Report	S Brick 0-8 (3f, 2 '65s), L Boyle 0-2, J Egan, M Conway, I McCarthy 0-1 each.	Referee: D Magee (Down)

7 July 2007	Kerry	2-21 - 2-11	Down	Austin Stack Park
	S Brick 0-15 (10fs), J Egan 1-2, M Conway 1-0, L Boyle, M Slattery, I McCarthy, J M Dooley 0-1.	Report	S Wilson 0-8 (5fs, 0-2 '65s), C Coulter 1-1, E Clark 1-0, C Courtney 0-1 (f), S Ennis 0-1.

7 July 2007	Mayo	0-11 - 2-14	Westmeath	McHale Park
	A Freeman 0-8, D Walsh, S Broderick, S Leneghan 0-1 each.		D McNicholas 1-4, J Shaw 0-5, A Mitchell 0-5, R Whelan 1-0.

14 July 2007	Westmeath	1-14 - 1-11	Kerry	Cusack Park

14 July 2007	Down	2-12 - 1-21	Meath	Páirc Esler
	S Wilson 1-6, C Coulter 1-1, E Clarke, A Savage 0-2 each, P Coulter 0-1)	Report	N Horan 0-13, S Clynch 1-0, E Brislane, G O'Neill 0-2 each, D Crimmins, K Dowd, M Cole, N Hackett 0-1 each.

=== Group 2B ===
Team	Pld	W	D	L	F	A	+/-	Pts	Qualification
Carlow	4	4	0	0	8-59	7-42	+20	8	Advance to Knockout Stage
Kildare	4	3	0	1	4-77	5-54	+20	6	Advance to Knockout Stage
Derry	4	2	0	2	8-56	9-57	-4	4	
Wicklow	4	1	0	3	6-59	7-62	-6	2	
London	4	0	0	4	7-40	5-76	-30	0	Advance to Relegation Playoff

16 June 2007	Wicklow	1-22 - 1-10	London	Pearse Park
	J Keogh 0-6, L Glynn 0-4, J Moran 1-0, W O’Gorman 0-3, D Hyland 0-3, T Collins 0-2, A Tiernan 0-2, G Bermingham 0-1, B Rickerby 0-1.		M Finn 0-6, A Kane 1-1, F McMahon 0-1, D Skehan 0-1, P Fagan 0-1.

16 June 2007	Carlow	3-13 - 0-15	Kildare	Dr. Cullen Park
	B Lawler 0-7, D Murphy 1-2, R Foley 1-0, A Brennan 1-0, D Roberts 0-2, J Waters 0-1, E Coady 0-1.		B White 0-2, M Moloney 0-2, K Divilly 0-2, T Murphy 0-2, M Dowd 0-2, Brendan Byrne 0-1, C Buggy 0-1, D Harney 0-1, D Kennedy 0-1, A McAndrew 0-1.	Referee: F Smith (Meath)

23 June 2007	London	2-9 - 2-14	Derry	Emerald GAA Grounds
	M Finn 2-2 (0-1 free), F McMahon, B Tennyson 0-2 each, K Kennedy, E Kinlon, E Leamy 0-1 each.		G O'Kane 1-6 (1-5 frees), SL McGoldrick 1-1, O McCloskey 0-3, S McBride 0-2, K Hinphey, M Craig 0-1 each.

23 June 2007	Kildare	2-17 - 1-17	Wicklow	St. Conleth's Park
	B White 0-7 4f, P O'Brien 1-1 1-0 f, C Buggy 1-0, M Maloney and O Lynch 0-2 each, P Reidy, K Divilly, D Kennedy, A McAndrew and M O'Dowd 0-1 each.		S Keogh 0-7 6f, D Hyland 0-3, G Bermingham 1-0, A Tiernan and L Rickerby 0-2 each, L Glynn J O'Neill and E Glynn 0-1 each.

30 June 2007	Derry	0-13 - 2-21	Kildare	Celtic Park
	G O'Kane 0-8 (7f), SL McGoldrick 0-2, O McClusky, D McSorley, S Dodds 0-1 each.	Report	B White 1-7 (7f), T Murphy 1-1, T Spain 0-4, O Lynch 0-3, K Divilly, M Moloney 0-2 each, D Harney, B Coulston 0-1 each.

30 June 2007	Wicklow	1-8 - 1-15	Carlow	Aughrim Park
	J Keogh 1-5, L Glynn, T Collins, G Doran 0-1 each.	Report	B Lawlor 0-9, C Doyle 1-1, R Foley 0-2, J Waters, M Brennan, J Miley 0-1 each.

7 July 2007	Carlow	2-15 - 3-9	Derry	Dr. Cullen Park
	B Lawler 0-5 (4fs), D Murphy 1-1, M Brennan 0-3 (1f), C Doyle 1-0, J Waters, A Brennan, R Foley 0-2 each	Report	S L McGoldrick 2-1, G O'Kane 0-3, (all fs), O McCloskey 1-0, P O'Kane, B Dodds, C Quinn, M Kirkpatrick, P Henry 0-1 each

7 July 2007	Kildare	0-24 - 1-11	London	St. Conleth's Park
	B White 0-10 (6f, 2'65), T Spain 0-4, M Moloney 0-4, K Divilly 0-2, D Moloney, T Murphy, B Coulston, O Lynch 0-1 each.		F McMahon 1-6 (1-0 pen, 3f) B Tennyson 0-3, S Malone, K Kennedy 0-1 each.

14 July 2007	London	3-10 - 2-16	Carlow	Emerald GAA Grounds
	M Finn 2-4 (0-4 frees), E Rocks 1-0, S Malone, B Tennison 0-2 each, E Leamy, K McMullen 0-1 each.	Report	M Brennan 0-5 (3f), B Lawlor 1-1, D Roberts 0-3, A Brennan 1-0, C Doyle, J Miley 0-2 each, S McMahon, R Coady, E Coady 0-1 each.	Referee: D Connolly (Kilkenny)

14 July 2007	Derry	3-20 - 3-12	Wicklow	Celtic Park
	SL McGoldrick 2-3, P McCloskey 1-1, G O'Kane 0-8, G Kelly 0-3, O McCloskey 0-2, R Kealey, C Quinn, M Kirkpatrick 0-1 each.	Report	G Doran, L Kennedy, S O'Loughlin 1-0 each, D Allen 0-5, L Kenny 0-3, A Kerins 0-2, E O'Sullivan, D Moran 0-1 each.	Referee: T Mahon (Fermanagh)

== Knockout Stage ==
=== Bracket ===
Semi-Finals
Meath	1–13
Kildare	1–14
Carlow	2–15
Westmeath	4–11

Final
Kildare	0–13
Westmeath	2–15

=== Semi-finals ===
21 July 2007 Semi-final	Meath	1-13 - 1-14	Kildare	O'Connor Park
	N Horan (0-6, all frees), G O'Neill (1-1), E Brislane (0-2), S Clynch (0-2), E Keogh (0-1), M Cole (0-1).	Report	B White (0-6, three frees, two 65s), B Byrne (1-1), P O'Brien (0-3), A McAndrew (0-2), C Buggy (0-1), K Divilly (0-1).	Referee: G Hoey (Clare)

21 July 2007 Semi-final	Carlow	2-15 - 4-11	Westmeath	O'Connor Park
	B Lawler (0-4, two frees), R Foley (1-0), C Doyle (1-0), M Brennan (0-3), A Brennan (0-2), F Foley (0-2, one free, one penalty), A Gaul (0-1), J Waters (0-1), D Roberts (0-1), R Dunbar (0-1).	Report	J Shaw (2-2), D McNicholas (1-1), D Carty (1-0), B Connaughton (0-3, one free, one 65), P Clarke (0-2), A Mitchell (0-2, one free), B Murtagh (0-1).	Referee: P Greene (Galway)

=== Final ===
5 August 2007 Final	Westmeath	2-15 - 0-13	Kildare	Croke Park
	A Mitchell (1-03, 0-03f), J Shaw (1-02), D Carty (0-05), B Kennedy (0-02), D McNicholas (0-01), P Clarke (0-01), E Loughlin (0-01).	Report	B White (0-07, 6f), P O'Brien (0-02, 2f), O Lynch (0-02), M Dowd (0-01), D Nolan (0-01).	Referee: J Sexton (Cork)

== Championship Statistics ==
=== Top scorers ===
==== Single game ====
Rank	Player	County	Tally	Total	Opposition
1	Shane Brick	Kerry	0-15	15	Down
2	Nicky Horan	Meath	0-13	13	Down
3	Shane Brick	Kerry	0-11	11	Mayo
4	Martin Finn	London	2-4	10	Carlow
4	Billy White	Kildare	1-7	10	Derry
4	Billy White	Kildare	0-10	10	London
7	Sean Leo McGoldrick	Down	2-3	9	Wicklow
7	Ciaran Courtney	Down	1-6	9	Westmeath
7	Brendan McGourty	Down	1-6	9	Mayo
7	Simon Wilson	Down	1-6	9	Meath
7	Gareth O'Kane	Derry	1-6	9	London
7	Fergus McMahon	London	1-6	9	Kildare
7	Brendan Lawler	Carlow	0-9	9	Wicklow

== Miscellaneous ==
- Westmeath won their 1st championship in 2 years, winning the 2005 Christy Ring Cup.
- Westmeath became the first county to win the Christy Ring Cup 2 times.

== See also ==
- 2007 All-Ireland Senior Hurling Championship
- 2007 Munster Senior Hurling Championship
- 2007 Leinster Senior Hurling Championship
- 2007 Ulster Senior Hurling Championship
- 2007 Nicky Rackard Cup (Tier 3)
