= Christy Ring Cup records and statistics =

This page details statistics of the Christy Ring Cup.

== General performances ==
=== Performance by county ===
County	Titles	Runners-up	Years won	Years runner-up
Kildare	5	1	2014, 2018, 2020, 2022, 2024	2007
Westmeath	3	1	2005, 2007, 2010	2008
Carlow	3	1	2008, 2009, 2017	2006
Meath	3	0	2016, 2019, 2023	—
Kerry	2	3	2011, 2015	2010, 2013, 2014
London	2	1	2012, 2025	2018
Down	1	4	2013	2005, 2009, 2019, 2020
Antrim	1	2	2006	2016, 2017
Offaly	1	0	2021	—
Derry	0	5	—	2015, 2021, 2023, 2024, 2025
Wicklow	0	2	—	2011, 2012
Mayo	0	1	—	2022

=== Performance by province ===
Province	Titles	Runners-up	Total
Leinster	15	5	20
Ulster	2	10	12
Munster	2	3	5
Britain	2	1	3
Connacht	0	1	1

Performances in the Christy Ring Cup final by province
Province	Winning counties	Runners-up
Leinster	Kildare (4), Westmeath (3), Carlow (3), Meath (2), Offaly (1)	Wicklow (2), Carlow (1), Kildare (1), Westmeath (1)
Ulster	Antrim (1), Down (1)	Down (4), Antrim (2), Derry (2)
Munster	Kerry (2)	Kerry (3)
Britain	London (1)	London (1)
Connacht	—	Mayo (1)

=== Total Intermediate grade championship titles ===
Includes All-Ireland Intermediate Hurling Championship and Christy Ring Cup.

County	Titles	Last Intermediate title
Cork	9	2018
Tipperary	7	2013
Kilkenny	5	2017
Kildare	6	2024
Wexford	4	2007
Carlow	4	2017
London	4	2025
Westmeath	3	2010
Galway	3	2015
Meath	3	2023
Antrim	2	2006
Kerry	2	2015
Limerick	1	1998
Clare	1	2011
Down	1	2013
Offaly	1	2021

=== Number of participating counties in the Christy Ring Cup ===
A total of 17 counties have played in the Christy Ring Cup. Season in bold represents teams qualified for the final that season.

Province	No.	Counties	Years in championship
Leinster (6)	21	Wicklow	2005, 2006, 2007, 2008, 2009, 2010, 2011, 2012, 2013, 2014, 2015, 2016, 2017, 2018, 2019, 2020, 2021, 2022, 2024, 2025, 2026
Leinster (6)	18	Kildare	2005, 2006, 2007, 2008, 2009, 2010, 2011, 2012, 2013, 2014, 2015, 2016, 2017, 2018, 2019, 2020, 2022, 2024
Leinster (6)	15	Meath	2005, 2006, 2007, 2008, 2010, 2011, 2012, 2013, 2014, 2015, 2016, 2019, 2023, 2025, 2026
Leinster (6)	6	Carlow	2005, 2006, 2007, 2008, 2009, 2017
Leinster (6)	5	Westmeath	2005, 2007, 2008, 2009, 2010
Leinster (6)	2	Offaly	2020, 2021
Ulster (6)	20	Derry	2005, 2007, 2008, 2009, 2010, 2011, 2012, 2013, 2014, 2015, 2016, 2018, 2019, 2020, 2021, 2022, 2023, 2024, 2025, 2026
Ulster (6)	16	Down	2005, 2006, 2007, 2008, 2009, 2010, 2011, 2012, 2013, 2014, 2015, 2016, 2017, 2018, 2019, 2020
Ulster (6)	5	Armagh	2008, 2011, 2013, 2014, 2018
Ulster (6)	3	Antrim	2006, 2016, 2017
Ulster (6)	3	Tyrone	2023, 2024, 2025
Ulster (6)	3	Donegal	2019, 2025, 2026
Connacht (3)	15	Mayo	2005, 2006, 2007, 2008, 2009, 2010, 2011, 2012, 2013, 2014, 2015, 2017, 2018, 2022, 2023
Connacht (3)	10	Roscommon	2005, 2006, 2008, 2016, 2017, 2018, 2019, 2020, 2021, 2026
Connacht (3)	5	Sligo	2020, 2021, 2022, 2023, 2024
Britain (1)	13	London	2006, 2007, 2008, 2012, 2015, 2016, 2017, 2018, 2019, 2022, 2023 2024, 2025
Munster (1)	12	Kerry	2005, 2006, 2007, 2008, 2009, 2010, 2011, 2012, 2013, 2014, 2015, 2026

== Counties ==
=== Team results ===
Legend

- 1st – Champions
- 2nd – Runners-up
- 3rd/4th/5th/SF/QF/GS – Semi-finals/Quarter-finals/Group Stage
- GS/10th – Relegated
- AI – All-Ireland Senior Hurling Championship
- JM – Joe McDonagh Cup
- NR – Nicky Rackard Cup

For each year, the number of counties (in brackets) are shown.

Team	2005(10)	2006(10)	2007(10)	2008(12)	2009(8)	2010(8)	2011(8)	2012(8)	2013(8)	2014(8)	2015(8)	2016(8)	2017(8)	2018(8)	2019(8)	2020(7)	2021(5)	2022(6)	2023(6)	2024(6)	Total
Antrim	AI	1st	AI	AI	AI	AI	AI	AI	AI	AI	AI	2nd	2nd	JM	JM	JM	AI	JM	AI	AI	3
Armagh	NR	NR	NR	GS	NR	NR	R2	NR	R2	R	NR	NR	NR	8th	NR	NR	NR	NR	NR	NR	5
Carlow	SF	2nd	SF	1st	1st	AI	AI	AI	AI	AI	AI	AI	1st	JM	AI	JM	JM	JM	JM	JM	6
Derry	10th	NR	GS	SF	QF		QF	QF	QF	QF	2nd	R	NR	SF	SF	R2	2nd	3rd	2nd		18
Donegal	NR	NR	NR	NR	LM	LM	LM	NR	NR	NR	NR	NR	NR	NR	RPO	NR	NR	NR	NR	NR	1
Down	2nd	SF	GS	QF	2nd		SF	SF	1st	RPO	SF	SF	SF	GS	2nd	2nd	JM	JM	JM	JM	16
Kerry	5th	9th	GS	QF	SF	2nd	1st	R2	2nd	2nd	1st	AI	AI	JM	JM	JM	JM	JM	JM	JM	11
Kildare	SF	SF	2nd	QF	QF		SF	QF	SF	1st	SF	SF	QF	1st	GS	1st	JM	1st	JM		18
London	NR	5th	GS	GS	NR	NR	NR	1st	AI	AI	QF	QF	QF	2nd	RPO	—	—	4th	4th		12
Mayo	9th	6th	GS	QF	SF		R2	R2	R2	SF	R	NR	R2	7th	NR	NR	NR	2nd	6th	NR	15
Meath	6th	8th	SF	GS	NR		QF	SF	SF	SF	QF	1st	AI	JM	1st	JM	JM	JM	1st	JM	13
Offaly	AI	AI	AI	AI	AI	AI	AI	AI	AI	AI	AI	AI	AI	AI	JM	SF	1st	JM	JM	JM	2
Roscommon	8th	10th	NR	GS	NR	NR	NR	NR	NR	NR	NR	QF	R2	GS	SF	SF	QF	NR	NR	NR	9
Sligo	NR	NR	NR	NR	NR	NR	NR	NR	NR	NR	LM	LM	LM	LM	NR	R2	SF	5th	3rd		5
Tyrone	NR	NR	NR	NR	LM	NR	LM	LM	NR	NR	NR	NR	NR	NR	NR	NR	NR	NR	5th		2
Westmeath	1st	AI	1st	2nd	R2	1st	AI	AI	AI	AI	AI	AI	AI	JM	JM	JM	JM	AI	AI	JM	5
Wicklow	7th	7th	GS	SF	R2		2nd	2nd	QF	QF	RPO	RPO	SF	SF	GS	R2	SF	6th	NR		19

=== Least successful counties ===
Out of the 17 counties who have participated, five counties have never been represented in a Christy Ring Cup Final. These are Armagh, Donegal, Roscommon, Sligo and Tyrone. Three of these counties have never competed in a semi-final: Armagh, Donegal, and Tyrone.

A lot of the Christy Ring Cup counties are more prominent in the sport of gaelic football. Christy Ring Cup participants such as Armagh, Derry, Donegal, Kerry, Mayo, Roscommon and Tyrone are more competitive and higher up the tiers in football.

== Team participation ==
=== Debut of teams ===
Year	Debutants	Total
2005	Carlow, Derry, Down, Kerry, Kildare, Mayo, Meath, Roscommon, Westmeath, Wicklow	10
2006	Antrim, London	2
2007	None	0
2008	Armagh	1
2009-18	None	0
2019	Donegal	1
2020	Offaly, Sligo	2
2021-22	None	0
2023	Tyrone	1
**Total**		**17**

=== Seasons in Christy Ring Cup ===
The number of years that each county has played in the Christy Ring Cup between 2005 and 2024. A total of 17 counties have competed in at least one season of the Christy Ring Cup. Wicklow have participated in the most seasons. The counties in bold participate in the 2024 Christy Ring Cup.

Years	Counties
19	**Wicklow**
18	**Derry**, **Kildare**
16	Down
15	Mayo
13	Meath
12	**London**
11	Kerry
9	Roscommon
6	Carlow
5	Armagh, **Sligo**, Westmeath
3	Antrim
2	Offaly, **Tyrone**
1	Donegal

=== List of Christy Ring Cup counties ===
Team	Total years	First year in championship	Most recent year in championship	Championship titles	Last championship title	Best Christy Ring Cup position	Position in 2023 championship	Current championship	Lvl
Antrim	3	2006	2017	1	2006	**1st**	5th (Leinster Senior Hurling Championship)	Leinster Senior Hurling Championship	1
Armagh	5	2008	2018	0	—	Group Stage	3rd (Nicky Rackard Cup)	Nicky Rackard Cup	4
Carlow	6	2005	2017	3	2017	**1st**	Champions (Joe McDonagh Cup)	Leinster Senior Hurling Championship	1
Derry	18	2005	2024	0	—	2nd	Runners-up	Christy Ring Cup	3
Donegal	1	2019	2019	0	—	Group Stage	Runners-up (Nicky Rackard Cup)	Nicky Rackard Cup	4
Down	16	2005	2020	1	2013	**1st**	5th (Joe McDonagh Cup)	Joe McDonagh Cup	2
Kerry	11	2005	2015	2	2015	**1st**	4th (Joe McDonagh Cup)	Joe McDonagh Cup	2
Kildare	18	2005	2024	4	2022	**1st**	6th (Joe McDonagh Cup)	Christy Ring Cup	3
London	12	2006	2024	1	2012	**1st**	4th	Christy Ring Cup	3
Mayo	15	2005	2023	0	—	2nd	6th	Nicky Rackard Cup	4
Meath	13	2005	2023	3	2023	**1st**	Champions	Joe McDonagh Cup	2
Offaly	2	2020	2021	1	2021	**1st**	Runners-up (Joe McDonagh Cup)	Joe McDonagh Cup	2
Roscommon	9	2005	2021	0	—	Semi-finals	4th (Nicky Rackard Cup)	Nicky Rackard Cup	4
Sligo	5	2020	2024	0	—	3rd	3rd	Christy Ring Cup	3
Tyrone	2	2023	2024	0	—	5th	5th	Christy Ring Cup	3
Westmeath	5	2005	2010	3	2010	**1st**	6th (Leinster Senior Hurling Championship)	Joe McDonagh Cup	2
Wicklow	19	2005	2024	0	—	2nd	Champions (Nicky Rackard Cup)	Christy Ring Cup	3

== All-time Christy Ring Cup rankings ==
=== All-time table ===
Legend

Colours
Currently competing in the Leinster Senior Hurling Championship or the Joe McDonagh Cup
Currently competing in the Christy Ring Cup
Currently competing in the Nicky Rackard Cup

As of 2024 Cup (before final).

#	Team	Pld	W	D	L	Points
1	Kildare	77	51	2	24	104
2	Down	65	36	3	26	75
3	Meath	52	31	4	17	66
4	Derry	69	30	2	37	62
5	Wicklow	69	27	3	39	57
6	Kerry	43	25	2	16	52
7	Carlow	31	22	2	7	46
=	London	52	22	2	28	46
9	Westmeath	25	18	1	6	37
10	Mayo	54	14	0	40	28
11	Antrim	15	11	1	3	23
12	Roscommon	37	9	0	28	18
13	Sligo	20	5	0	15	10
14	Offaly	6	4	1	1	9
15	Tyrone	10	3	1	6	7
16	Armagh	13	1	0	12	2
17	Donegal	4	0	0	4	0

== Teams ==
=== By Semi-Final Appearances ===
Team	No.	Years in Semi-finals
Kildare	13	2005, 2006, 2007, 2010, 2011, 2013, 2014, 2015, 2016, 2018, 2020, 2022, 2024
Down	11	2005, 2006, 2009, 2011, 2012, 2013, 2015, 2016, 2017, 2019, 2020
Derry	10	2008, 2015, 2018, 2019, 2021, 2022, 2023, 2024, 2025, 2026
Meath	8	2007, 2012, 2013, 2014, 2016, 2019, 2023, 2026
Wicklow	8	2010, 2011, 2012, 2017, 2018, 2021, 2025, 2026
Kerry	7	2009, 2010, 2011, 2013, 2014, 2015, 2026
Carlow	6	2005, 2006, 2007, 2008, 2009, 2017
London	6	2012, 2018, 2022, 2023, 2024, 2025
Westmeath	4	2005, 2007, 2008, 2010
Mayo	4	2008, 2009, 2014, 2022
Antrim	3	2006, 2016, 2017
Offaly	2	2020, 2021
Roscommon	2	2019, 2020
Sligo	2	2021, 2023
Tyrone	1	2024
Donegal	1	2025

=== By decade ===
The most successful team of each decade, judged by number of Christy Ring Cup titles, is as follows:

- 2000s: 2 each for Westmeath (2005, 2007) and Carlow (2008, 2009)
- 2010s: 2 each for Kerry (2011, 2015), Kildare (2014, 2018) and Meath (2016, 2019)
- 2020s: 3 for Kildare (2020, 2022, 2024)

=== Match records ===
- Most matches played
  - 81, Derry
- Most wins
  - 52, Kildare
- Most losses
  - 43, Wicklow
- Most draws
  - 5, Meath

=== Other records ===
==== Finishing positions ====
- Most championships
  - 5, Kildare (2014, 2018, 2020, 2022, 2024)
- Most second-place finishes
  - 4 Down (2005, 2009, 2019, 2020)
  - 4, Derry (2015, 2021, 2023, 2024)
- Most third-place finishes
  - 1, Derry (2022)
  - 1, Sligo (2023)
  - 1, London (2024)
  - 1, Wicklow (2025)
  - 1, Meath (2026)
- Most fourth-place finishes
  - 2, London (2022, 2023)
  - 2
- Most fifth-place finishes
  - 1, Sligo (2022)
  - 1, Tyrone (2023)
  - 1, Wicklow (2024)
  - 1, Meath (2025)
  - 1, Donegal (2026)
- Most sixth-place finishes
  - 1, Wicklow (2022)
  - 1, Mayo (2023)
  - 1, Sligo (2024)
  - 1, Tyrone (2025)
  - 1, Roscommon (2026)
- Most semi-final finishes
  - 7, Kildare (2005, 2006, 2010, 2011, 2013, 2015, 2016)
- Most quarter-final finishes
  - 5, Derry (2009, 2011, 2012, 2013, 2014)
- Most group stage finishes
  - 3, Meath (2005, 2006, 2008)
  - 3, London (2006, 2007, 2008)
  - 3, Mayo (2006, 2007, 2018)
  - 3, Wicklow (2006, 2007, 2019)

==== Unbeaten sides ====
- Ten teams have won the Christy Ring Cup unbeaten:
  - Westmeath had 5 wins and 1 draw in 2007.
  - Carlow had 4 wins and 1 draw in 2009.
  - Kerry had 4 wins in 2011.
  - Kerry had 4 wins in 2015.
  - Meath had 4 wins and 1 draw in 2016.
  - Kildare had 5 wins in 2018.
  - Meath had 5 wins in 2019.
  - Kildare had 3 wins in 2020.
  - Offaly had 3 wins in 2021.
  - Kildare had 6 wins in 2022.

==== Beaten sides ====
The group stage of the cup has resulted in 10 'back-door' Christy Ring Cup champions:

- Westmeath (2005) were beaten by Meath in round 2.
- Antrim (2006) were beaten by Down in round 1.
- Carlow (2008) were beaten by Down in round 3.
- Westmeath (2010) were beaten by Kerry in round 2.
- London (2012) were beaten by Meath in round 1.
- Down (2013) were beaten by Kerry in round 1.
- Kildare (2014) were beaten by Kerry in round 2.
- Carlow (2017) were beaten by Antrim in round 1.
- Meath (2023) were beaten by London in round 2.
- London (2025) were beaten by Derry in round 2.

On 000 occasions a team was defeated twice but have remained in the championship:

- 000 (000) were beaten by 000 and 000 but still qualified for the final.

==== Final success rate ====
Only one county have appeared in the final more than once, being victorious on all occasions:

- Meath (2016, 2019, 2023)

On the opposite end of the scale, only two counties has appeared in the final more than once, losing on each occasion:

- Derry (2015, 2021, 2023)
- Wicklow (2011, 2012)

==== Consecutive participations ====
- 21, Wicklow

Wicklow have the record number of consecutive participations in the Christy Ring Cup, taking part in 21 seasons, followed by Derry (20).

==== Winning other trophies ====
Although not an officially recognised achievement, a number of teams have achieved the distinction of winning the Christy Ring Cup and their respective Division in the National Hurling League:

- Kerry in 2015 (Division 2A).
- Offaly in 2021 (Division 2A).
- Meath in 2023 (Division 2B).

==== Biggest wins ====
- The most one sided finals:
  - 21 points – 2021: Offaly 0-41 - 2-14 Derry
  - 18 points – 2006: Antrim 5-13 - 1-07 Carlow
  - 16 points – 2022: Kildare 2-29 - 1-19 Mayo
  - 14 points – 2018: Kildare 3-19 - 1-11 London
  - 13 points – 2011: Kerry 2-21 - 2-08 Wicklow
- The most one sided group matches:
  - 00 points – 0000: 0000

==== Scoring Events ====
- Most goals in a match:
  - 0 – 0000: 0000
- Most points in a match:
  - 0 – 0000: 0000
- Most goals by one team in a match:
  - 0 – 0000: 0000
- Most points by one team in a match:
  - 0 – 0000: 0000
- Highest aggregate score:
  - 0 – 0000: 0000
- Lowest aggregate score:
  - 0 – 0000: 0000

==== Successful defending ====
A total of nineteen seasons have been played and only one team has been successful in retaining the cup. (most teams were promoted after winning the Christy Ring Cup, therefore they were unable to defend the cup):

- Carlow on one attempt out of two (2009)

==== Gaps ====
- Longest gaps between successive cup titles:
  - 8 years: Carlow (2009–2017)
  - 4 years: Kildare (2014–2018)
  - 4 years: Meath (2019–2023)
- Longest gaps between successive Christy Ring Cup final appearances:
  - 11 years: Kerry (2015–2026)
  - 10 years: Antrim (2006–2016)
  - 7 years: Kildare (2007–2014)
  - 7 years: London (2018–2025)
  - 6 years: London (2012–2018)
  - 6 years: Down (2013–2019)
  - 6 years: Kildare (2015–2021)
- Longest gap between successive championship appearances
  - 10 years: Antrim (2006–2016)

==== Active gaps ====
- Longest active gaps between since last title:
  - 20 years: Antrim (2006–)
  - 16 years: Westmeath (2010–)
  - 13 years: Down (2013–)
  - 11 years: Kerry (2015–)
  - 9 years: Carlow (2017–)
  - 5 years: Offaly (2021–)
  - 3 years: Meath (2023–)
  - 2 years: Kildare (2024–)
  - 1 year: London (2025–)
- Longest active gaps since last cup final appearance:
  - 16 years: Westmeath (2010–)
  - 14 years: Wicklow (2012–)
  - 9 years: Antrim (2017–)
  - 9 years: Carlow (2017–)
  - 6 years: Down (2020–)
  - 5 years: Offaly (2021–)
  - 4 years: Mayo (2022–)
  - 3 years: Meath (2023–)
  - 2 years: Kildare (2024–)
  - 1 year: London (2025–)
  - 0 years: Derry (2026–)
  - 0 years: Kerry (2026–)
- Longest active gap since last cup appearance
  - 16 years: Westmeath (2010–)

==== Provinces ====
- Only on 2 occasions has the Christy Ring Cup final involved two teams from the same province:
  - Westmeath vs Kildare (2007)
  - Carlow vs Westmeath (2008)
- The province providing the highest number of different winning teams is Leinster, with 5:
  - Carlow
  - Kildare
  - Meath
  - Offaly
  - Westmeath

==== Christy Ring Cup final pairings ====
Pairing	Meetings	First	Last
Antrim v Carlow	2	2006	2017
Derry v Kerry	2	2015	2026
Antrim v Meath	1	2016	
Carlow v Down	1	2009	
Carlow v Westmeath	1	2008	
Derry v Kildare	1	2024	
Derry v Meath	1	2023	
Derry v Offaly	1	2021	
Down v Kerry	1	2013	
Down v Kildare	1	2020	
Down v Meath	1	2019	
Down v Westmeath	1	2005	
Kerry v Kildare	1	2014	
Kerry v Westmeath	1	2010	
Kerry v Wicklow	1	2011	
Kildare v Westmeath	1	2007	
London v Wicklow	1	2012	
Kildare v London	1	2018	
Kildare v Mayo	1	2022	
Derry v London	1	2025	

==== Longest undefeated run ====
The record for the longest unbeaten run stands at 00 games held by 000 (00-00).

==== Miscellaneous ====
- Best finish by a debuting team
  - Champions, Westmeath (2005)
- Best finish by a debuting team (after 2005)
  - Champions, Antrim (2006)
- Highest winning record
  - 73%, Antrim (11 wins in 15 matches)
- Lowest winning record
  - 0%, Donegal (0 wins in 4 matches)
- Most played match
  - 000, 000 v 000 (0000)

== Managers ==
=== Winning managers (2022–present) ===
#	Manager(s)	Winning team(s)	Titles(s)	Winning years
1	David Herity	Kildare	1	2022
1	Seoirse Bulfin	Meath	1	2023

== Player records ==
=== Top Scorers Overall ===
Season	Top scorer	Team	Score	Total
2005	Mattie Dowd	Kildare	2-39	45
2006	Paul Braniff	Down	6-26	44
2007	Shane Brick	Kerry		
2008	Brendan Murtagh	Westmeath	2-37	43
2009	Shane Brick	Kerry	1-42	45
2010	Darragh O'Connell	Kerry	1-38	41
2011	Darragh O'Connell	Kerry	1-33	36
2012	Martin Finn	London	5-29	44
2013	Paul Braniff	Down	3-34	43
2014	Mikey Lee	Wicklow	4-38	50
2015	Shane Nolan	Kerry	2-35	41
2016	Ciarán Clarke	Antrim	3-43	52
2017	Denis Murphy	Carlow	0-45	45
2018	-	-	-	-
2019	-	-	-	-
2020	Cathal Dolan	Roscommon	2-25	31
2021	Eoghan Cahill	Offaly	0-36	36
2022	Shane Boland	Mayo	1-52	55

=== Top Scorers In The Final ===
Season	Top scorer	Team	Score	Total
2005	Andrew Mitchell	Westmeath	0-9	9
2006	Johnny McIntosh	Antrim	2-4	10
2007	Billy White	Kildare	0-7	7
2008	Brendan Murtagh	Westmeath	2-10	16
2009	Simon Wilson	Down	0-7	7
2010	Darragh O'Connell	Kerry	0-8	8
2011	Darragh O'Connell	Kerry	1-9	12
2012	Jonathan Maher	London	3-4	13
2013	Shane Nolan	Kerry	1-9	12
2014	Shane Nolan	Kerry	1-4	7
2014	Gerry Keegan	Kildare	1-4	7
2015	Shane Nolan	Kerry	1-8	11
2016	James Toher	Meath	0-12	12
2017	Ciarán Clarke	Antrim	2-9	15
2018	James Burke	Kildare	0-8	8
2019	Paul Sheehan	Down	1-8	11
2020	Oisin McManus	Down	0-9	9
2021	Eoghan Cahill	Offaly	0-13	13
2022	James Burke	Kildare	0-11	11

=== Miscellaneous ===
- Most Christy Ring Cup winners' medals: 3
  - Joe Clarke (Westmeath) – 2005, 2007, 2010
  - Paul Greville (Westmeath) – 2005, 2007, 2010
  - Conor Jordan (Westmeath) – 2005, 2007, 2010
  - Enda Loughlin (Westmeath) – 2005, 2007, 2010
  - Darren McCormack (Westmeath) – 2005, 2007, 2010
  - Andrew Mitchell (Westmeath) – 2005, 2007, 2010
  - Brendan Murtagh (Westmeath) – 2005, 2007, 2010
  - John Shaw (Westmeath) – 2005, 2007, 2010
  - Ronan Whelan (Westmeath) – 2005, 2007, 2010
  - Richard Coady (Carlow) - 2008, 2009, 2017
  - Paul Divilly (Kildare) - 2014, 2018, 2020
  - Niall Ó Muineacháin (Kildare) - 2014, 2018, 2020

== See also ==
- All-Ireland Senior Hurling Championship records and statistics
- Christy Ring Cup
