= 2016 Christy Ring Cup =

- Dates: 23 April – 25 June 2016
- Teams: 8
- Champions: Meath (1st title); James Toher (captain); Martin Ennis (manager)
- Runners-up: Antrim; Neal McAuley (captain); Dominic McKinley (manager)

Tournament statistics
- Matches played: 16
- Goals scored: 40 (2.5 per match)
- Points scored: 540 (33.75 per match)
- Top scorer(s): Ciarán Clarke (2-38)

The 2016 Christy Ring Cup was the 12th staging of the Christy Ring Cup hurling championship since its establishment by the Gaelic Athletic Association in 2005. The competition began on Saturday 23 April 2016 and ended on Saturday 25 June 2016.

Kerry were the 2015 champions and were promoted to the All-Ireland Senior Hurling Championship.

In the first final on 4 June 2016 a mistake was made in recording the score. Meath were presented with the Christy Ring Cup as the final score was believed to be Meath 2-18 to Antrim's 1-20. On 7 June 2016 the CCCC ordered that the final be replayed. Meath won the replay on 25 June 2016 after extra time, beating Antrim 4-21 to 5-17.

== Format ==
The 2016 Christy Ring Cup was played in a double-elimination format. For clarity, the draw details are detailed in each round below.

== Team changes ==
=== To Championship ===
Relegated from the All-Ireland Senior Hurling Championship

- Antrim

Promoted from the Nicky Rackard Cup

- Roscommon

=== From Championship ===
Promoted to the All-Ireland Senior Hurling Championship

- Kerry

Relegated to the Nicky Rackard Cup

- Mayo

== Teams ==
=== General Information ===
County	Last Cup title	Last Provincial title	Last All-Ireland title	Position in 2015 Championship	Appearance
Antrim	2006	2015	—	Group Stage (Leinster Senior Hurling Championship)	2nd
Derry	—	2001	—	Runners-up	11th
Down	2013	1997	—	Semi-finals	12th
Kildare	2014	—	—	Semi-finals	12th
London	2012	—	1901	Quarter-finals	6th
Meath	—	—	—	Quarter-finals	11th
Roscommon	—	1913	—	Champions (Nicky Rackard Cup)	4th
Wicklow	—	—	—	Round 2	12th

=== Personnel and kits ===
County	Manager	Captain(s)	Sponsor

== Round 1 ==
All eight teams play in Round 1.

23 April 2016 Round 1	Antrim	3-20 - 0-17	Kildare	Parnell Park, Dublin
	C Clarke 2-10, J Dillon 1-0, C Carson, N McKenna, J Connolly 0-2 each, C Johnson, C McKinley, M Dudley, R McCambridge 0-1 each.		G Keegan 0-11, M Fitzgerald 0-2, M Grace, P Divilly, N Ó Muineacháin, B Byrne 0-1 each.

23 April 2016 Round 1	Down	2-12 - 2-17	London	McKenna Park, Ballycran
	C Egan 2-0, D Toner 0-3fs, P Sheehan, C Woods (2fs) 0-2 each, C Taggart, J McGrath, S Nicholson, D Hughes, S Dineen 0-1 each.	Report	K O'Loughlin 1-7 (0-6fs), S O'Donnell 1-1, G Mahon, M Duggan 0-3, B Walsh, K Reid, D Roberts 0-1 each.	Referee: G McGrath (Wexford)

23 April 2016 Round 1	Meath	3-18 - 2-12	Wicklow	St. Loman's Park, Trim
	G McGowan (2-2), N Heffernan (1-3), A Gannon (0-5, 2fs), S Morris (0-4), J Toher (0-3, 1f), M O'Grady (0-1).	Report	J Henderson (1-0), P Doran (1-0), D Staunton (0-3), M Lee (0-3, 2fs), C Moorhouse (0-2, 1f 1 65), D Masterson (0-2. 1f 1 65), E Kearns (0-1), G Weir (0-1).	Referee: J O'Brien (Tipperary)

23 April 2016 Round 1	Roscommon	2-20 - 0-15	Derry	Athleague Sportsfield
	J Fallon 0-7 (4f, 1 sideline), C Egan 1-3 (1-2f), J Lawlor 1-0, T Featherston 0-3, A Moore, M Kelly, C Dolan, A Murphy, E Flanagan, T Seale, N Connaughton 0-1 each.	Report	R Convery 0-7 (6f), B Quigley, A Grant, S Farren 0-2 each, T McCloskey, M McGuigan 0-1 each.	Referee: J Keane (Galway)

== Round 2 ==
=== Round 2A ===
Contested by the four winners of Round 1.

30 April 2016 Round 2A	Antrim	2-14 - 1-12	Roscommon	Pearse Park, Dunloy
	C Clarke 0-7 (4fs), J Connolly 0-4, C Carson, N Elliott 1-0 each, E McCloskey, N McKenna, J Dillon 0-1 each.	Report	C Egan, J Fallon (3fs) 0-4 each, J Lawlor 1-0, C Dolan 0-3, M Kelly 0-1.	Referee: J Keane (Galway)

31 April 2016 Round 2A	London	1-16 - 2-17	Meath	Emerald GAA Grounds, Ruislip
	K O'Loughlin 0-6 (5fs), M Duggan 1-2, K Reid 0-4, M O'Dywer 0-2, D Roberts, P Phelan 0-1 each.	Report	A Gannon 1-5 (0-3fs), G McGowan 1-1, N Heffernan, J Toher (1f) 0-2 each, S Quigley, S Heavey, S McGann (f), S Brennan, D Healy, R Sherlock, K Keena 0-1 each.	Referee: D Hughes (Carlow)

=== Round 2B ===
Contested by the four losers of Round 1.

30 April 2016 Round 2B	Wicklow	0-9 - 0-17	Kildare	Pearse Park, Arklow
	C Moorhouse 0-8 (7fs), S Kelly 0-1 ('65').	Report	G Keegan 0-10 (9fs), M Moloney, M Fitzgerald 0-2 each, S Gainey, R Bergin, N O'Muineacháin 0-1 each.	Referee: G McGrath (Wexford)

30 April 2016 Round 2B	Derry	1-15 - 1-18	Down	Owenbeg
	S Farren 0-8 (4fs), O McCloskey 1-0, R Convery 0-3 (2fs), Se McGuigan 0-2 , T McCloskey, P Cleary 0-1.	Report	B Byers 1-1, D Toner (2fs), O McManus 0-4 each A O'Prey 0-3, F Conway, J McGrath, C Woods (f), S Nicholson, P Sheehan (f), C O'Prey 0-1 each.	Referee: C Cunning (Antrim)

== Quarter-finals ==
The two losers of round 2A (who won a match and lost a match) play the two winners of round 2B (who lost a match and won a match). These two matches are referred to as quarter-finals.

7 May 2016 Quarter-final	Kildare	1-17 - 0-15	London	St. Conleth's Park, Newbridge
14:00	G Keegan 0-9(4f), M Delaney 1-1, J Byrne, P Cocoman and J Sheridan 0-2 each, M Fitzgerald 0-1.	Report	K O'Loughlin 0-7(6f), S O'Donnell and M O'Dwyer 0-3 each, C Hickey and M Duggan 0-1 each.

7 May 2016 Quarter-final	Down	1-14 - 1-7	Roscommon	McKenna Park, Ballycran
14:00	C O’Prey (0-4, frees), D Toner (1-0), C Mageean (0-2), B Byers (0-2), S Nicholson (0-2), C Egan (0-1), O McManus (0-1), D Hughes (0-1), C Woods (0-1 free).	Report	N Connaughton (1-0), J Fallon (0-2, 0-1 free), J Lawlor (0-2), E Flanagan (0-2), T Fetherston (0-1).	Referee: D Hughes (Carlow)

== Semi-finals ==
The winners of round 2A play the winners of the two quarter-finals.

21 May 2016 Semi-final	Antrim	1-24 - 0-23	Down	St. Patrick's Park, Loughguile
	C Clarke 0-16 (12f, 1 '65); C Carson 1-1; N McKenna 0-3; E McCloskey, J Dillon, E Campbell, Conor Johnston 0-1 each.	Report	D Toner 0-9 (5f); C Woods 0-4; C Taggart, D Hughes, C O'Prey (2f, 1 '65) 0-3 each; C Egan 0-1.	Referee: D Hughes (Carlow)

22 May 2016 Semi-final	Kildare	0-21 - 1-21	Meath	St. Conleth's Park, Newbridge
	G Keegan (9f, 1 '65) 0-12, M Delaney, M Fitzgerald 0-2 each; M Grace, P Cocoman, J Byrne, L Quinn and J Sheridan 0-1 each.	Report	J Toher (9f) 0-12, G McGowan 1-3; S Clynch 0-3; S Heavey, S Morris and N Heffernan 0-1 each.	Referee: J Keane (Galway)

== Final ==
The winners of this year's Christy Ring Cup final (tier 2) will be automatically promoted to play in the qualifier group of next year's Leinster Senior Hurling Championship.

4 June 2016 Final	Meath	2-17 - 1-20	Antrim	Croke Park, Dublin
17:30	N Heffernan, S Quigley 1-1 each, J Toher 0-5 (5f), A Gannon, J Keena 0-3 each, K Keoghan 0-2, S Heavey, K Keena 0-1 each.	Report	C Johnston 1-2, C Clarke 0-5 (1f, 1 '65), J Connolly 0-4, E McCloskey, N McKenna 0-3 each, E Campbell, C McKinley, S McAfee 0-1 each.	Referee: J O'Brien (Tipperary)

=== Controversy ===
During the final a point that wasn't actually scored was awarded to Meath on the official scoreboard. At the end of the match the score was recorded as Meath 2-18 Antrim 1-20 and the referee mistakenly confirmed this score. Meath were awarded the trophy. On 7 June 2016 the CCCC ruled that the final score was a draw, 2-17 to 1-20, and that the match should be replayed.

== Replayed Final ==
Charity donation

All proceeds from this game were donated to two charities nominated by Meath and Antrim.

25 June 2016 Replayed Final	Meath	4-21 - 5-17 (AET)	Antrim	Croke Park, Dublin
	J Toher 0-12 (0-11 fs); N Heffernan 2-0, S Clynch 1-3 (0-2 fs), G McGowan 1-0, A Gannon, S Quigley 0-2, S Morris, J Keena 0-1.	Report	C Clarke 1-5 (0-1 f; 0-1 65), N McKenna 1-5, C Johnston 1-2, D Hamill, J Connolly 1-0, D McKiernan 0-2, N Elliott, E Campbell, S McAfee 0-1.	Attendance: 2,938; Referee: C McAllister (Cork)

== Christy Ring/Nicky Rackard play-offs ==
=== Bottom play-off ===
Contested by the two losers from round 2B. Both these teams lost their first two matches.

21 May 2016 Bottom play-off	Wicklow	2-23 - 0-15	Derry	Páirc Esler, Newry
3:30 pm	C Moorhouse (8fs) 1-11; D Staunton 1-3; D Masterson 0-4; M Lee 0-2; P Doran, T Storey, A Byrne 0-1 each.	Report	R Convery (6fs) 0-7; M McGuigan 0-3; J O'Dwyer, O McCloskey, M McGrath, D Foley, A Grant 0-1 each.	Referee: J O'Brien (Tipperary)

=== Relegation/Promotion play-off ===
The bottom team in this year's Christy Ring Cup (tier 2) plays the winner of this year's Nicky Rackard Cup (tier 3). If the Nicky Rackard champions win the match, they are promoted to next year's Christy Ring Cup in the place of this year's bottom team.

11 June 2016 Play-off	Derry	1-14 - 1-21	Mayo	Seán O'Heslin Park, Ballinamore
	R Convery (0-8, 5f), S Farren (1-3), A Grant (0-2), M McGrath (0-1).	Report	K Feeney (0-11, 8f), J McManus (0-4), D McTigue (1-0), S Regan (0-1), K McDermott (0-1), C Charlton (0-1), C Freeman (0-1), D Kenny (0-1), J Cotter (0-1).	Referee: J Keane

== Scoring statistics ==
Overall

Rank	Player	County	Tally	Total	Matches	Average
1	Ciarán Clarke	Antrim	3-43	52	5	10.40
2	Gerry Keegan	Kildare	0-42	42	4	10.50
3	James Toher	Meath	0-34	34	5	6.80
4	Ruairí Convery	Derry	0-25	25	4	6.25
5	Christy Moorehouse	Wicklow	1-21	24	3	8.00
6	Kevin O'Loughlin	London	1-20	23	3	7.66
7	Gavin McGowan	Meath	5-6	21	5	4.20
8	Danny Toner	Down	2-13	19	4	4.75
8	Neil Heffernan	Meath	4-7	19	5	3.80
10	Adam Gannon	Meath	1-15	18	5	3.60

Top scorers in a single game

Rank	Player	Team	Tally	Total	Opposition
1	Ciarán Clarke	Antrim	2-10	16	Kildare
1	Ciarán Clarke	Antrim	0-16	16	Down
3	Christy Moorehouse	Wicklow	1-11	14	Derry
4	Gerry Keegan	Kildare	0-12	12	Meath
4	James Toher	Meath	0-12	12	Kildare
4	James Toher	Meath	0-12	12	Antrim
7	Gerry Keegan	Kildare	0-11	11	Antrim
7	Kenny Feeney	Mayo	0-11	11	Derry
9	Kevin O'Loughlin	London	1-7	10	Down
9	Gerry Keegan	Kildare	0-10	10	Wicklow
