= 2018 Christy Ring Cup =

- Dates: 12 May – 23 June 2018
- Teams: 8
- Champions: Kildare (2nd title); Brian Byrne (captain); Joe Quaid (manager)
- Runners-up: London; Brian Regan (captain); Fergus McMahon (manager)

Tournament statistics
- Matches played: 15
- Official website: gaa.ie

The 2018 Christy Ring Cup was the 14th staging of the Christy Ring Cup hurling championship since its establishment by the Gaelic Athletic Association in 2005. It is the third tier of senior inter-county hurling. The competition began on 12 May 2018 and ended on 23 June 2018.

Carlow were the 2017 champions, beating Antrim in the final. Both teams were included in the counties competing in the newly created Joe McDonagh Cup. Roscommon lost their play-off match against Mayo in 2017 – normally Roscommon would have been relegated but they remained in the 2018 Christy Ring Cup as a result of the restructuring of the hurling championship tiers.

Kildare were the 2018 Chrisy Ring champions, defeating London by 3–19 to 1–11 in the final. Kildare lost the relegation/promotion game against Antrim and remained in the Christy Ring Cup for 2019.

== Team changes ==
=== To Championship ===
Relegated from the All-Ireland Senior Hurling Championship

- None

Promoted from the Nicky Rackard Cup

- Armagh
- Derry

=== From Championship ===
Promoted to the Joe McDonagh Cup

- Antrim
- Carlow

Relegated to the Nicky Rackard Cup

- None

== Format ==
Beginning in 2018, the Christy Ring Cup changed to an initial stage of two groups of four teams. Previously it was a double elimination tournament. The top two teams from both groups advance to the semi-finals. In 2018, teams at the bottom of each group will automatically be relegated to the Nicky Rackard Cup for 2019. In subsequent years, the bottom teams will meet in a relegation playoff to decide the one team relegated to the following year's Nicky Rackard Cup.

The Christy Ring champions contest a promotion/relegation playoff with the second bottom team in the Joe McDonagh Cup with the winner earning the right to compete in the 2019 Joe McDonagh Cup.

Following the creation of the Joe McDonagh Cup in 2018, the Christy Ring Cup was reclassified as tier 3 (it was previously tier 2).

== Teams ==
=== General Information ===
| County | Cup Titles | Last Cup Title | Position in 2017 championship |
|---|---|---|---|
| Armagh | 0 | - | Runners-up (Nicky Rackard Cup) |
| Derry | 0 | - | Champions (Nicky Rackard Cup) |
| Down | 1 | 2013 | Semi-finals |
| Kildare | 1 | 2014 | Quarter-finals |
| London | 1 | 2012 | Quarter-finals |
| Mayo | 0 | - | Round 2 |
| Roscommon | 0 | - | Round 2 |
| Wicklow | 0 | - | Semi-finals |

=== Personnel and kits ===
| County | Manager | Captain(s) | Sponsor |
|---|---|---|---|
| Armagh | | | |
| Derry | | | |
| Down | | | |
| Kildare | Joe Quaid | | Brady Family |
| London | | | Clayton Hotels |
| Mayo | | | Intersport Elvery's |
| Roscommon | | | |
| Wicklow | | | |

== Group stage ==
=== Group 1 ===
==== Group 1 Table ====
| Pos | Team | Pld | W | D | L | SF | SA | Diff | Pts | Qualification |
|---|---|---|---|---|---|---|---|---|---|---|
| 1 | Kildare | 3 | 3 | 0 | 0 | 89 | 58 | 31 | 6 | Advance to Knockout Stage |
| 2 | Wicklow | 3 | 2 | 0 | 1 | 72 | 64 | 8 | 4 | Advance to Knockout Stage |
| 3 | Roscommon | 3 | 1 | 0 | 2 | 48 | 71 | -22 | 2 | |
| 4 | Mayo | 3 | 0 | 0 | 3 | 46 | 63 | -17 | 0 | Relegation to Nicky Rackard Cup |

==== Group 1 Rounds 1 to 3 ====
===== Group 1 Round 1 =====
| 12 May 2018 Round 1 | Kildare | 4-26 - 1-09 | Roscommon | St. Conleth's Park, Newbridge |
| | B Cormack 0-15 (11fs, 1 '65'); M Fitzgerald 3-3; S Ryan 1-0; P Divilly 0-3 (1f); É O'Neill, M Grace, N O'Muineacháin, M Purcell, K Whelan 0-1 each. | Report | N Connaughton 1-2; D Glynn 0-4 (2fs); J Keane (f), J Kilkenny, R Fallon (f), A Moore 0-1 each. | Referee: S Hynes (Galway) |

| 12 May 2018 Round 1 | Wicklow | 1-20 - 2-11 | Mayo | Joule Park, Aughrim |
| | A O'Brien 0-8 (5f), M Lee 0-4, S Germaine 1-1, C Moorehouse, PJ Nolan 0-2 each, G Byrne, D Staunton, G O'Brien 0-1 each. | Report | K Feeney 0-9 (8f), C Scahill, E Ryan 1-0 each, P Kiely, S Boland 0-1 each. | Referee: P Burke (Kilkenny) |

===== Group 1 Round 2 =====
| 19 May 2018 Round 2 | Mayo | 1-15 - 2-14 | Kildare | MacHale Park, Castlebar |
| | K Feeney 0-9 (7f)), K Higgins 1-1, B Morley, S Boland, E Ryan, P Kiely and D O'Brien (1f) 0-1 each. | Report | S Ryan 1-2, B Cormack 0-4 (4f), B Sheridan 1-1, P Divilly 0-3 (1f), N O'Muineachain, K Whelan, C Bonus and B Deay 0-1 each. | Referee: R McGann (Clare) |

| 19 May 2018 Round 2 | Roscommon | 0-16 - 2-16 | Wicklow | Dr. Hyde Park, Roscommon |
| | D Glynn 0-10 (5f, 1 '65), M Byrne, S Curley (sideline), E Flanagan, K Hardiman, W Boyle, N Connaughton 0-1 each. | Report | A O'Brien 1-4 (1-0 pen, 2 '65s, 1f), M Lee 0-4 (1f), D Staunton 1-0, PJ Nolan, R Keddy, C Moorehouse (1f) 0-2 each, E Kearns, G O'Brien 0-1 each. | Referee: N Wall (Cork) |

===== Group 1 Round 3 =====
| 2 June 2018 Round 3 | Wicklow | 3-18 - 4-19 | Kildare | Joule Park, Aughrim |
| | A O'Brien 0-7 (2f), R Keddy 2-0, PJ Nolan 0-5, E Donohue 1-1, P Keane, G Byrne, P Doyle, G O'Brien, M Lee 0-1 each. | Report | J Sheridan 2-5 (1 sl), M Fitzgerald 2-1, B Cormack (3f), S Ryan 0-3 each, J Burke (1f), B Byrne 0-2 each, C Bonus, K Whelan, P Divilly 0-1 each. | Referee: T Walsh (Waterford) |

| 2 June 2018 Round 3 | Roscommon | 1-17 - 0-11 | Mayo | Athleague Sportsfield, Athleague |
| | D Glynn 1-3 (1-3f), J Keane 0-5 (5f), C Kenny 0-3, R Fallon 0-2, S Curley (sideline), N Connaughton, H Rooney, C Egan 0-1 each. | Report | S Boland 0-5 (5f), K Higgins & C Freeman 0-2 (1f) each, K Feeney (f) & B Morley 0-1 each. | Referee: S Stack (Dublin) |

=== Group 2 ===
==== Group 2 Table ====
| Pos | Team | Pld | W | D | L | SF | SA | Diff | Pts | Qualification |
|---|---|---|---|---|---|---|---|---|---|---|
| 1 | London | 3 | 2 | 0 | 1 | 88 | 60 | 28 | 4 | Advance to Knockout Stage |
| 2 | Derry | 3 | 2 | 0 | 1 | 89 | 65 | 24 | 4 | Advance to Knockout Stage |
| 3 | Down | 3 | 2 | 0 | 1 | 92 | 69 | 23 | 4 | |
| 4 | Armagh | 3 | 0 | 0 | 3 | 39 | 114 | -75 | 0 | Relegation to Nicky Rackard Cup |

London, Derry and Down all finished on 4 points and were ranked on score difference.

==== Group 2 Rounds 1 to 3 ====
===== Group 2 Round 1 =====
| 12 May 2018 Round 1 | Derry | 1-18 - 1-20 | London | Dean McGlinchey Park, Ballinascreen |
| 1:00 pm | C O'Doherty 0-11 (9fs), S McGuigan 1-0, N Waldron 0-3, C McKaigue 0-2, M McGuigan, C Waldron 0-1. | Report | A Sheehan 0-10 (6fs), K O'Loughlin 1-2, R Murphy 0-3 (2fs), K Reid, F Collins, H Vaughan, C Nelson, J Troy 0-1 each. | Referee: J Keane (Galway) |

| 12 May 2018 Round 1 | Down | 6-21 - 0-11 | Armagh | McKenna Park, Ballycran |
| | D Sands 3-3, P Sheehan 0-7 (5fs), E Sands 1-3, O McManus 1-1, D McManus 1-0, M Magee, D Toner, C Bailie 0-2 each, M Fisher 0-1. | Report | N Curry 0-7 (6fs), D McCreesh 0-2, S Renaghan, D Magee 0-1 each. | Referee: A Devine (Westmeath) |

===== Group 2 Round 2 =====
| 19 May 2018 Round 2 | Armagh | 1-14 - 2-30 | Derry | Athletic Grounds, Armagh |
| 1:00 pm | D McCreesh 0-5, S Renaghan 1-1, C Rice 0-2, E McGuinness, D McKenna, J Corvan, N Curry (f), D Gaffney, S Toal 0-1 each | Report | A Grant 0-7 (4f, 1 '65); B Cassidy 0-6 (3f), M McGrath 1-3; N Waldron 1-1, S McGuigan 0-4; D Cartin, M McGuigan, G Bradley, C Waldron 0-2 each; P Cleary 0-1. | Referee: L Gordon (Galway) |

| 20 May 2018 Round 2 | London | 1-23 - 2-22 | Down | McGovern Park, Ruislip |
| 2:30pm | C Nelson 1-6, A Sheehan 0-7 (2f, 1 '65'), S Lawless 0-4, K O'Loughlin 0-3, C Burke 0-2, R Murphy 0-1 (1f). | Report | D Toner 1-6, P Sheehan 0-7 (5f, 1 '65'), D Sands 1-2, P Og McCrickard 0-4, C Bailie 0-2, D McManus 0-1. | Referee: P Murphy (Carlow) |

===== Group 2 Round 3 =====
| 2 June 2018 Round 3 | Derry | 1-29 - 2-19 | Down | Watty Graham Park, Maghera |
| 1:00 pm | C O'Doherty 1-17 (16f), M McGrath 0-3, B Cassidy, A Grant 0-2 each, R Convery (f), M McGuigan, C McKaigue, N Waldron, C Waldron 0-1 each. | Report | P Sheehan 0-9 (6f), D Sands 2-0, D McManus 0-3, O McManus 0-2, E Sands, P McCrickard, C Bailie, D Toner, R Branagan 0-1 each. |

| 2 June 2018 Round 3 | Armagh | 0-11 – 4-27 | London | Athletic Grounds, Armagh |
| 1:00 pm | C McAnallen 0-5 (5f), E McGuinness, S Renaghan, D McCreesh 0-2 each. | Report | C Nelson 0-6, S Lawless 1-2, A Sheehan (1f, 2'65's'), M Duggan, C Burke 0-4 each, J Troy 1-1, M Dwyer 0-3, F Collins 1-0, H Vaughan 1-0 M Ivors (f), R Murphy, C McAlinden 0-1 each. | Referee: A Devine (Westmeath) |

== Knockout stage ==
=== Bracket ===
Semi-Finals
London | 2-28
Wicklow | 2-14
Kildare | 3-18
Derry | 2-13

Final
London | 1-11
Kildare | 3-19

=== Semi-finals ===
The Group 1 winners play the Group 2 runners-up and the Group 2 winners play the Group 1 runners-up.

9 June 2018
Semi-final

| London | 2-28 - 2-14 | Wicklow |
|---|---|---|
| A Sheehan 0-13 (6fs, 2 65s); S Lawless 2-1; H Vaughan 0-3; M Dwyer, J Troy, M Duggan 0-2 each; C Burke, S Conlon, M Ivors, S Lohan, R Murphy 0-1 each | Report | A O'Brien 1-5; (0-3fs, 0-1 65); G O'Brien 1-1; P Doyle 0-3; D Staunton 0-2; R Keddy, S Kelly, E Donoghue 0-1 each |

Dr. Cullen Park, Carlow
Referee: J O'Brien (Laois)
10 June 2018
Semi-final

| Kildare | 3-18 - 2-13 | Derry |
|---|---|---|
| J Sheridan 2-0, B Cormack 0-5f, J Burke 0-4(2f), M Fitzgerald 1-1, S Ryan 0-2, M Moloney, M Grace, N O’Muineacháin, B Byrne, P Divilly and K Whelan 0-1 each | Report | C O’Doherty 0-6(5f), S McGuigan 1-2, B Rogers 1-1, G Bradley 0-2, P Cleary and C Waldron 0-1 each |

Grattan Park, Inniskeen

=== Final ===
23 June 2018
2:00 pm
Final

| London | 1-11 - 3-19 | Kildare |
|---|---|---|
| A Sheehan 0-6 (5f), C Nelson 1-0, K O’Loughlin 0-2 (2f), S Lawless, J Troy D O’Regan 0-1 each | Report | James Burke 0-8, Jack Sheridan 2-1, Shane Ryan 1-0, Eanna O'Neill 0-2, Mark Delaney 0-2, Niall Ó Muineacháin 0-2, Paul Divily 0-1, Martin Fitzgerald 0-1, Brian Byrne 0-1, Kevin Whelan 0-1 |

Croke Park, Dublin
Referee: Patrick Murphy (Carlow)

== Relegation/promotion playoff ==
30 June 2018
Relegation/Promotion

| Antrim | 3-23 - 1-17 | Kildare |
|---|---|---|
| | Report |

Athletic Grounds

Antrim retain their place in the Joe McDonagh Cup for 2019, while Kildare remain in the Christy Ring Cup for 2019.

== Stadia and locations ==
| County | Location | Province | Stadium(s) | Capacity |
|---|---|---|---|---|
| Neutral venue | Dublin | Leinster | Croke Park | 82,300 |
| Armagh | Armagh | Ulster | Athletic Grounds | 18,500 |
| Derry | Derry | Ulster | Celtic Park | 22,000 |
| Down | Newry | Ulster | Páirc Esler | 20,000 |
| Kildare | Newbridge | Leinster | St Conleth's Park | 8,200 |
| London | South Ruislip | Britain | McGovern Park | 3,000 |
| Mayo | Castlebar | Connacht | MacHale Park | 25,369 |
| Roscommon | Roscommon | Connacht | Dr Hyde Park | 25,000 |
| Wicklow | Aughrim | Leinster | Aughrim County Ground | 7,000 |

=== Stadiums and locations ===
| County | Location | Stadium |
|---|---|---|
| Armagh | Armagh | Athletic Grounds |
| Derry | Ballinascreen | Dean McGlinchey Park |
| Down | Ballycran | McKenna Park |
| Kildare | Newbridge | St Conleth's Park |
| London | South Ruislip | McGovern Park |
| Mayo | Castlebar | MacHale Park |
| Roscommon | Roscommon | Dr Hyde Park |
| Wicklow | Aughrim | Joule Park |

== Championship statistics ==
=== Top scorers ===
==== Overall ====
Updated to 2 June 2018

| Rank | Player | Club | Tally | Total | Matches | Average |
|---|---|---|---|---|---|---|
| 1 | Cormac O'Doherty | Derry | 1-28 | 31 | 2 | 15.50 |
| 2 | Daithí Sands | Down | 6-05 | 23 | 3 | 7.66 |
| 2 | Paul Sheehan | Down | 0-23 | 23 | 3 | 7.66 |
| 4 | Andy O'Brien | Wicklow | 1-19 | 22 | 3 | 7.33 |
| 4 | Barry Cormack | Kildare | 0-22 | 22 | 3 | 7.33 |
| 6 | Aaron Sheehan | London | 0-21 | 21 | 3 | 7.00 |
| 7 | Daniel Glynn | Roscommon | 1-17 | 20 | 3 | 6.66 |
| 8 | Martin Fitzgerald | Kildare | 5-04 | 19 | 3 | 6.33 |
| 8 | Kenny Feeney | Mayo | 0-19 | 19 | 3 | 6.33 |
| 10 | Colin Nelson | London | 1-13 | 16 | 3 | 5.33 |

==== In a single game ====
| Rank | Player | Club | Tally | Total | Opposition |
|---|---|---|---|---|---|
| 1 | Cormac O'Doherty | Derry | 1-17 | 20 | Down |
| 2 | Barry Cormack | Kildare | 0-15 | 15 | Roscommon |
| 3 | Aaron Sheehan | London | 0-13 | 13 | Wicklow |
| 4 | Daithí Sands | Down | 3-03 | 12 | Armagh |
| 4 | Martin Fitzgerald | Kildare | 3-03 | 12 | Roscommon |
| 6 | Jack Sheridan | Kildare | 2-05 | 11 | Wicklow |
| 6 | Cormac O'Doherty | Derry | 0-11 | 11 | London |
| 8 | Aaron Sheehan | London | 0-10 | 10 | Derry |
| 8 | Daniel Glynn | Roscommon | 0-10 | 10 | Wicklow |

== Miscellaneous ==
- Kildare won their 1st championship in 4 years, winning the 2014 Christy Ring Cup.

== See also ==
- 2018 All-Ireland Senior Hurling Championship
- 2018 Leinster Senior Hurling Championship
- 2018 Munster Senior Hurling Championship
- 2018 Joe McDonagh Cup
- 2018 Nicky Rackard Cup
- 2018 Lory Meagher Cup
