= 2015 Christy Ring Cup =

- Dates: 2 May – 6 June 2015
- Teams: 8
- Champions: Kerry (2nd title); John Griffin (captain); Éamonn Kelly (manager)
- Runners-up: Derry; Seán MacCullagh (captain); Tom McClean (manager)

Tournament statistics
- Matches played: 16
- Top scorer(s): Shane Nolan (2-35)

The 2015 Christy Ring Cup was the eleventh staging of the Christy Ring Cup hurling championship since its establishment by the Gaelic Athletic Association in 2005. The cup competition began on 2 May 2015 and ended on 6 June 2014.

Kildare were the defending champions, however, they were beaten in the semi-final. Kerry won the title after defeating Derry by 1-20 to 0-12 in the final.

Mayo were relegated from the Christy Ring Cup after losing a play-off with Roscommon.

== Format ==
The 2015 Christy Ring Cup is played in a double-elimination format. For clarity, the draw details are explained in each round below.

== Team changes ==
=== To Championship ===
Relegated from the All-Ireland Senior Hurling Championship

- London

Promoted from the Nicky Rackard Cup

- None

=== From Championship ===
Promoted to the All-Ireland Senior Hurling Championship

- None

Relegated to the Nicky Rackard Cup

- Armagh

== Teams ==
=== General Information ===
County	Last Cup title	Last Provincial title	Last All-Ireland title	Position in 2014 Championship	Appearance
Derry	—	2001	—	Quarter-finals	10th
Down	2013	1997	—	Round 2	11th
Kerry	2011	1891	1891	Runners-up	11th
Kildare	2014	—	—	Champions	11th
London	2012	—	1901	Group Stage (Leinster Senior Hurling Championship)	5th
Mayo	—	1909	—	Semi-finals	11th
Meath	—	—	—	Semi-finals	10th
Wicklow	—	—	—	Quarter-finals	11th

=== Personnel and kits ===
County	Manager	Captain(s)	Sponsor

== Round 1 ==
All eight teams play in four matches.

2 May 2015 Round 1	Kerry	2-17 - 2-10	Down	Austin Stack Park
13:00	S Nolan (0-8, 7f), P Boyle (1-1), P Kelly (0-4), C Harty (1-0), D Dineen (0-1), M O'Leary (0-1), J Egan (0-1), D Butler (0-1).		D Toner (1-3), J Coyle (0-4, 2f), C Egan (1-1), M McCullagh (0-1), C Woods (0-1f).	Referee: J Keane

2 May 2015 Round 1	Derry	0-13 - 0-11	Mayo	Owenbeg
14:00	R Convery (0-6f), J O'Dwyer (0-3), A Grant (0-2), P Henry (0-1), D Foley (0-1).		K Feeney (0-9, 7f, 1'65), K McDermott (0-2).

2 May 2015 Round 1	London	2-23 - 2-23	Kildare	Emerald GAA Grounds
14:00	M Duggan (1-2), P Phelan (0-5, 3f, 1'65), B Gaffney (0-4, 1f), L Hands (1-0), E Cooney (0-3), N Rogers (0-3), S Lambert (0-2, 1f), M Ivors (0-2), N Brophy (0-1), D Morkan (0-1).		G Keegan (1-4), M Delaney (0-7, 5f), M Moloney (1-0), L Quinn (0-3), P Divilly (0-2), J Byrne (0-2), B Deay (0-2), D Young (0-1), M Fitzgerald (0-1), E Dempsey (0-1).

2 May 2015 Round 1	Meath	1-21 - 1-5	Wicklow	St. Loman's Park
16:00	J Regan 0-10 (4fs); J Fagan 1-5; M Burke 0-2; A Douglas, S Morris, C Bird, K Keoghan 0-1 each.	Report	A O'Brien 1-4 (3fs,1 65), A Byrne 0-1.	Referee: D Hughes (Carlow)

9 May 2015 Round 1 replay	Kildare	0-19 - 3-16	London	St. Conleth's Park
13:00	M Delaney 0-10 (8fs); M Moloney, B Deay, G Keegan 0-2 each; K Whelan, P Divilly, D Flaherty 0-1 each.	Report	M Duggan 3-3; P Phelan 0-6(5fs, 1 65); M O'Dwyer, D Morkham (1f) 0-2 each; M Ryan, N Brophy, M Ivors 0-1 each.	Referee: J O'Brien (Tipperary)

== Round 2 ==
=== Round 2A ===
Contested by four winners from round 1

9 May 2015 Round 2A	Kerry	1-23 - 2-18	Meath	Austin Stack Park
12:30	S Nolan (0-12, 9f, 1 '65), C Harty (1-0), P Boyle (0-3), J Egan (0-2), D Collins (0-1), M Boyle (0-1), D Butler (0-1), S Weir (0-1), R Horgan (0-1), J O'Neill (0-1).	Report	J Regan (1-11, 1-0 penalty, 7f, 1 sideline cut), W McGrath (1-3), J Fagan (0-2), E Marsh (0-1), M Burke (0-1).	Referee: D O'Driscoll (Limerick)

16 May 2015 Round 2A	Derry	1-12 - 2-8	London	Owenbeg
	P Henry (1-6, 0-5f, 0-1'65), R Convery (0-3, 2f), P McCloskey (0-1), P Cleary (0-1), N Ferris (0-1).	Report	M O’Dwyer (2-0), P Phelan (0-6f), N Rogers (0-1), T Healy (0-1).	Referee: J Keane

=== Round 2B ===
Contested by four losers from round 1

9 May 2015 Round 2B	Down	1-19 - 0-13	Wicklow	McKenna Park
15:00	G Johnson 0-6; C Egan 1-3; S Dineen, F Conway and D Toner 0-2 each; P Sheehan and M Turley 0-1.	Report	A O'Brien 0-4; L Glynn 0-2; C Moorehouse, A Byrne, E Kearns, E Dunne, M Lee, D Staunton and E Glynn 0-1 each.	Referee: O Elliott (Antrim)

16 May 2015 Round 2B	Mayo	1-16 - 2-18	Kildare	James Stephens Park
	F Boland (0-7), K Feeney (0-7, 3f, 1'65), K Higgins (1-0), K McDermott (0-1), S Hoban (0-1).	Report	W Greene (2-3), M Delaney (0-7, 5f), G Keegan (0-3), M Fitzgerald (0-2), B Deay (0-2), D Flaherty (0-1).	Referee: E Hasson (Derry)

== Quarter-finals ==
Winners of round 2B versus losers of round 2A in two games referred to as quarter finals.

23 May 2015 Quarter-final	Meath	2-18 - 3-23	Kildare	St. Loman's Park
14:00	J Regan (1-8, 0-8fs), J Fagan (1-1), W McGrath (0-3), J Toher (0-2), E Marsh (0-2), M Burke (0-1), S Morris (0-1).	Report	G Keegan (2-5), M Delaney (0-9, 5fs), B Deay (1-3), D Young (0-1), F O Muineachain (0-1), E O'Neill (0-1), W Greene (0-1), D Flaherty (0-1), D Stapleton (0-1).	Referee: T Carroll (Offaly)

23 May 2015 Quarter-final	Down	1-22 - 1-13	London	McKenna Park
	G Johnson 1-9 (7f, 1 '65'), F Conway 0-3, C Woods 0-3 (3f), D Toner, S Dineen 0-2 each, J Coyle, M McCullough, D Hughes 0-1 each.	Report	B Gaffney 1-0 (pen), P Phelan 0-3 (1f), T Healy, N Brophy 0-2 each, M Ryan, D Morkan, E Cooney, S Lambert, L Hands, M O'Dwyer 0-1 each	Referee: E Hassan (Derry)

== Semi-finals ==
Winners of round 2A versus winners of the two quarter-finals

30 May 2014 Semi-final	Kildare	0-09 - 6-27	Kerry	St. Conleth's Park
	M Fitzgerald 0-2; M Delaney (f), D Flaherty, E O’Neill, P Divilly (f), G Keegan (f), D Stapleton, N Ó Muineacháin 0-1 each.	Report	M Boyle 4-1; S Nolan 1-7(5fs, 2 65s); P Boyle 0-5; M O’Leary 0-4; C Harty 1-1; J Egan, J Griffin, J O’Neill 0-2 each; K Carmody, B O’Leary, D Collins 0-1 each.	Referee: S Cleere (Kilkenny)

30 May 2014 Semi-final	Derry	0-23 - 2-12	Down	Owenbeg
	R Convery 0-7 (4f), P Cleary 0-6, P Henry 0-5 (4f), A Grant 0-3, P McCloskey, A Rafferty 0-1 each.	Report	G Johnson 1-5 (0-3f), J Coyle 1-1, S Dineen 0-2, F Conwa$y, M Ennis, D McManus, S Nicholson 0-1 each.	Referee: O Elliott (Antrim)

== Final ==
6 June 2015 Final	Kerry	1-20 - 0-12	Derry	Croke Park
17:30	Shane Nolan 1-8 (0-7f), Michael O’Leary 0-3, Keith Carmody 0-3, Colum Harty 0-2, Patrick Kelly 0-2, John Egan 0-1, Daniel Collins 0-1.	Report	Ruairi Convery 0-5 (0-5f), Patrick Henry 0-4 (0-4f), Alan Grant 0-1, Liam Hinphey 0-1, Jonathan O’Dwyer 0-1.	Referee: John Keane (Galway)

The winners of this year's Christy Ring Final are automatically promoted to play in the Qualifier Group of next year's Leinster Championship.

== Christy Ring/Nicky Rackard Relegation/Promotion ==
=== Play-off ===
Contested by two losers from round 2B

23 May 2015 Relegation play-off	Wicklow	1-18 - 1-11	Mayo	Cusack Park
13:00

=== Relegation/Promotion play-off ===
The bottom team in this year's Christy Ring Cup plays the winner of this year's Nicky Rackard Cup.

14 June 2015 Play-off	Mayo	0-13 - 2-14	Roscommon	Pearse Stadium
13:45	K Feeney (0-7, 4f, 1'65), F Boland (0-3, 1f), C Scahill (0-1), D Kenny (0-1), K McDermott (0-1).	Report	J Coyne (2-3, 0-2f), M Kelly (0-3, 1f, 1'65), J Fallon (0-3, 2f), J Kilkenny (0-1), J Moran (0-1), R O’Meara (0-1), C Egan (0-1), K Kilkenny (0-1).	Referee: D O'Driscoll

== Top scorers ==
Overall

Rank	Player	County	Tally	Total	Matches	Average
1	Shane Nolan	Kerry	2-35	41	4	10.25
2	Mark Delaney	Kildare	0-36	36	5	7.20
3	Jack Regan	Meath	2-29	35	3	11.66

Single game

Rank	Player	County	Tally	Total	Opposition
1	Jack Regan	Meath	1-11	14	Kerry
2	Mikey Boyle	Kerry	4-1	13	Kildare
3	Martin Duggan	London	3-3	12	Kildare
3	Gareth Johnson	Down	1-9	12	London
3	Shane Nolan	Kerry	0-12	12	Meath
6	Gerry Keegan	Kildare	2-5	11	Meath
6	Jack Regan	Meath	1-8	11	Kildare
6	Shane Nolan	Kerry	1-8	11	Derry
9	Shane Nolan	Kerry	1-7	10	Kildare
9	Jack Regan	Meath	0-10	10	Wicklow
9	Mark Delaney	Kildare	0-10	10	London
