= Gerry Keegan =

Irish hurler

Personal information
- Native name: Gearóid Mac Aogáin (Irish)
- Born: 12 March 1994 (age 32) Celbridge, County Kildare, Ireland
- Occupation: Beer Merchant
- Height: 5 ft 11 in (180 cm)

Sport
- Sport: Hurling
- Position: Right corner-forward
Club
- Years: Club
- Celbridge
Club titles
- Kildare titles: 3
Inter-county
- Years: County
- 2012-present: Kildare
Inter-county titles
- Leinster titles: 0
- All-Irelands: 0
- NHL: 0
- All Stars: 0

Gerry Keegan (born 12 March 1994) is an Irish hurler who plays as a right corner-forward for the Kildare senior team.

Born in Celbridge, County Kildare, Keegan first arrived on the inter-county scene at the age of sixteen when he first linked up with the Kildare minor team, before later joining the under-21 side. Keegan made his senior debut in the 2012 Christy Ring Cup. Since then he has become a key member of the team and has won one Christy Ring Cup medal.

At club level Keegan is a two-time championship medallist with Celbridge.

== Team ==
Celbridge

- Kildare Senior Hurling Championship (3): 2011, 2013, 2018

Kildare

- Christy Ring Cup (1): 2014
- All-Ireland Under-21 B Hurling Championship: (1) 2014
- Kehoe Cup (1): 2013
