= 2008 Christy Ring Cup =

- Dates: 2008
- Teams: 12
- Champions: Carlow (1st title)
- Runners-up: Westmeath
- Relegated: Armagh, London, Meath, Roscommon

Tournament statistics
- Matches played: 23

The 2008 Christy Ring Cup is the fourth edition of the Christy Ring Cup since its establishment by the Gaelic Athletic Association in 2005 and is the second-tier of Hurling for senior county teams (the All-Ireland Senior Hurling Championship is the first-tier trophy). It is contested by twelve GAA county teams ranked 13–24 in the 2008 All-Ireland Senior Hurling Championship.

Carlow beat Westmeath in the final after extra time. Carlow were beaten by Laois the bottom team in the Liam MacCarthy Cup and played in the Christy Ring Cup again the following year as a result.

== Team changes ==
=== To Championship ===
Relegated from the All-Ireland Senior Hurling Championship

- None

Promoted from the Nicky Rackard Cup

- Armagh
- Roscommon

=== From Championship ===
Promoted to the All-Ireland Senior Hurling Championship

- None

Relegated to the Nicky Rackard Cup

- None

== Teams ==
=== General Information ===
| County | Last Cup title | Last Provincial title | Last All-Ireland title | Position in 2007 Championship | Appearance |
|---|---|---|---|---|---|
| Armagh | — | — | — | | 1st |
| Carlow | — | — | — | | 4th |
| Derry | — | 2001 | — | | 3rd |
| Down | — | 1997 | — | | 4th |
| Kerry | — | 1891 | 1891 | | 4th |
| Kildare | — | — | — | | 4th |
| London | — | — | 1901 | | 3rd |
| Mayo | — | 1909 | — | | 4th |
| Meath | — | — | — | | 4th |
| Roscommon | — | 1913 | — | | 3rd |
| Westmeath | 2007 | — | — | | 3rd |
| Wicklow | — | — | — | | 4th |

=== Personnel and kits ===
| County | Manager | Captain(s) | Sponsor |

== Format ==
Twelve teams participated in the 2008 Christy Ring Cup.

- Group 2A: Roscommon, Westmeath, Wicklow
- Group 2B: Carlow, Down, London
- Group 2C: Kerry, Mayo, Meath
- Group 2D: Armagh, Derry, Kildare

Each team in the group played each other once in the first phase. The top two teams in each group advanced to the quarter-finals. The bottom team in each group went into the relegation play-offs.

== Group stage ==
=== Group 2A ===
| Pos | Team | Pld | W | D | L | SF | SA | Diff | Pts | Qualification |
|---|---|---|---|---|---|---|---|---|---|---|
| 1 | Wicklow | 2 | 2 | 0 | 0 | 4–39 | 1–27 | +21 | 4 | Advance to Knockout Stage |
| 2 | Westmeath | 2 | 1 | 0 | 1 | 4–38 | 1–31 | +16 | 2 | Advance to Knockout Stage |
| 3 | Roscommon | 2 | 0 | 0 | 2 | 0–25 | 6–44 | −37 | 0 | |

==== Matches ====
| 29 June 2008 | Westmeath | 3–23 – 0–13 | Roscommon | Cusack Park |
| | J Shaw 1–5, A Mitchell 0–5, R Jackson 0–5, B Murtagh 0–4, D McNicholas 1–0, P Dowdall 1–0, E Price 0–2, D McCormack 0–1, L Smyth 0–1. | | S Curley 0–3, G Fallon 0–3, M Connaughton 0–3, A Cunniffe 0–1, T Seale 0–1, T Lennon 0–1, J Moran 0–1. | Referee: A Kelly (Galway) |

| 5 July 2008 | Roscommon | 0–12 – 3–21 | Wicklow | Athleague Sportsfield |
| | S Curley 0–3, M Connaughton 0–2, B Kelly 0–2, M Kelly 0–2, S Sweeney 0–2, G Fallon 0–1. | | J O’Neill 1–11, T Collins 1–1, E Furlong 1–1, D Hyland 0–3, S Kinsella 0–2, J Murphy 0–1, R Keddy 0–1, A Shanahan 0–1. | Referee: T Ryan (Tipperary) |

| 12 July 2008 | Wicklow | 1–18 – 1–15 | Westmeath | Pearse Park |
| | J O’Neill 0–9, D Hyland 0–5, S Kinsella 1–1, E Furlong 0–2, A Shanahan 0–1, | | B Murtagh 0–6, L Smyth 1–1, D Curley 0–2, A Mitchell 0–1, B Smyth 0–1, J Shaw 0–1, B Connaughton 0–1, E Price 0–1, R Jackson 0–1. | Referee: A Stapleton (Laois) |

=== Group 2B ===
| Pos | Team | Pld | W | D | L | SF | SA | Diff | Pts | Qualification |
|---|---|---|---|---|---|---|---|---|---|---|
| 1 | Down | 2 | 2 | 0 | 0 | 4–38 | 2–27 | +17 | 4 | Advance to Knockout Stage |
| 2 | Carlow | 2 | 1 | 0 | 1 | 2–43 | 4–22 | +15 | 2 | Advance to Knockout Stage |
| 3 | London | 2 | 0 | 0 | 2 | 3–17 | 3–49 | −32 | 0 | |

==== Matches ====
| 28 June 2008 | Carlow | 2–24 – 1–9 | London | Dr. Cullen Park |
| | R Foley 1–3, C Doyle 1–2, M Brennan 0–5, C Hughes 0–5, S Kavanagh 0–3, J Coady 0–2, D Roberts 0–1, A Brennan 0–1, D Murphy 0–1, J Hickey 0–1. | | M Mythern 1–1, M Finn 0–4, C McDonnell 0–2, A Comerford 0–1, N Healy 0–1, | Referee: S Whelan (Wexford) |

| 5 July 2008 | London | 2–8 – 1–25 | Down | Emerald GAA Grounds |
| | K McMullen 0–5, I Walshe 1–1, M Mythen 1–0, N Healy 0–1, S Malone 0–1 | | P Branniff 0–10, B McGourty 0–6, G Johnston 1–2, A Savage 0–3, R McGrattan 0–1, K Courtney 0–1, K McGarry 0–1, S Clarke 0–1. | Referee: O Elliott (Antrim) |

| 12 July 2008 | Down | 3–13 – 0–19 | Carlow | Páirc Esler |
| | P Braniff 2–5, G Johnson 1–4, B McGourty 0–2, K Courtney 0–1, C Woods 0–1. | | C Hughes 0–9, S Kavanagh 0–3, R Dunbar 0–3, C Doyle 0–2, J Coady 0–1, M Brennan 0–1. | Referee: R Matthews (Antrim) |

=== Group 2C ===
| Pos | Team | Pld | W | D | L | SF | SA | Diff | Pts | Qualification |
|---|---|---|---|---|---|---|---|---|---|---|
| 1 | Kerry | 2 | 1 | 0 | 1 | 7–26 | 4–31 | +4 | 2 | Advance to Knockout Stage |
| 2 | Mayo | 2 | 1 | 0 | 1 | 0–30 | 0–31 | −1 | 2 | Advance to Knockout Stage |
| 3 | Meath | 2 | 1 | 0 | 1 | 4–29 | 7–23 | −3 | 2 | |

==== Matches ====
| 28 June 2008 | Meath | 0–16 – 0–12 | Mayo | Páirc Tailteann |
| | N Hackett 0–8, S Clynch 0–3, M Burke 0–2, T Fox 0–1, D Crimmins 0–1, G O'Neill 0–1. | | A Freeman 0–9, K Higgins 0–2, D McConn 0–1. | Referee: B Murphy (Cavan) |

| 5 July 2008 | Mayo | 0–18 – 0–15 | Kerry | McHale Park |
| | A Freeman 0–9, K Higgins 0–4, P Higgins 0–2, D McConn 0–2, D McDonnell 0–1. | | M Conway 0–8, L Boyle 0–3, B Brick 0–2, M Quilter 0–1, J O’Brien 0–1. | Referee: T Carroll (Offaly) |

| 12 July 2008 | Kerry | 7–11 – 4–13 | Meath | Austin Stack Park |
| | M Conway 3–3, B Brick 2–2, L Boyle 1–2, M Boyle 1–2, J Griffin 0–1, J Egan 0–1. | | S Clynch 2–2, M Cole 1–1, N Hackett 0–4, A Snow 1–0, G O’Neill 0–3, N Horan 0–3. | Referee: G Hoey (Clare) |

=== Group 2D ===
| Pos | Team | Pld | W | D | L | SF | SA | Diff | Pts | Qualification |
|---|---|---|---|---|---|---|---|---|---|---|
| 1 | Kildare | 2 | 2 | 0 | 0 | 7–44 | 1–25 | +37 | 4 | Advance to Knockout Stage |
| 2 | Derry | 2 | 1 | 0 | 1 | 5–26 | 7–34 | −14 | 2 | Advance to Knockout Stage |
| 3 | Armagh | 2 | 0 | 0 | 2 | 5–19 | 9–30 | −23 | 0 | |

==== Matches ====
| 28 June 2008 | Kildare | 2–28 – 1–12 | Derry | St. Conleth's Park |
| | A McAndrew 0–5, T Murphy 1–1, K Divilly 1–1, T Byrne 0–4, M Divilly 0–3, M Dowd 0–3, C Buggy 0–3, R Hoban 0–3, M Moloney 0–2, D Harney 0–1, P Divilly 0–1, B White 0–1. | | O McCloskey 0–5, S Dodds 1–0, M Craig 0–2, P Henry 0–2, K Hinphey 0–1, N Holly 0–1, D Brunton 0–1. | Referee: N Cosgrove (Tipperary) |

| 5 July 2008 | Derry | 4–14 – 5–6 | Armagh | Celtic Park |
| | R Convery 1–9, S Dodds 1–1, P Henry 1–0, M Craig 1–0, K Hinphey 0–2, S Henry 0–1, O McCloskey 0–1, | | G Enright 1–5, J Corvan 2–0, F Bradley 1–0, C Carville 1–0, M Mone 0–1. | Referee: T McIntyre (Antrim) |

| 12 July 2008 | Armagh | 0–13 – 5–16 | Kildare | Athletic Grounds |
| | G Enright 0–6, B McCann 0–3, C McAlinden 0–2, M Mone 0–1, F Bradley 0–1. | | M Divilly 2–2, A McAndrew 1–2, R Hoban 0–4, A Murphy 0–3, N Dolan 1–0, D Harney 1–0, O Lynch 0–2, C Everett 0–1, C Bogey 0–1, P Divilly 0–1. | Referee: M Haverty (Galway) |

== Knockout stage ==
=== Quarter-finals ===
| 19 July 2008 Quarter-final | Wicklow | 1–22 – 3–18 (aet) | Mayo | Aughrim Park |
| | J O’Neill 0–8, D Hyland 0–4, S Kinsella 1–0, R Keddy 0–3, J Murphy 0–3, T Collins 0–2, G Bermingham 0–1, E Furlong 0–1. | Report | K Higgins 0–9, A Freeman 1–3, S Broderick 1–1, D McConn 1–0, D McConnell 0–3, P Higgins 0–1, E Madigan 0–1. | Referee: D Connolly (Kilkenny) |

| 19 July 2008 Quarter-final | Down | 0–18 – 1–20 | Derry | Páirc Esler |
| | P Braniff 0–7, B McGourty 0–2, S Wilson 0–2, G Johnson 0–2, S Clarke 0–1, E Trainor 0–1, A Savage 0–1, B Ennis 0–1, E Clarke 0–1. | | M Kirkpatrick 0–11, P McCloskey 1–1, SL McGoldrick 0–3, K Hinphey 0–2, O McCloskey 0–1, N Holly 0–1, B Dodds 0–1. | Referee: F Smith (Meath) |

| 19 July 2008 Quarter-final | Kerry | 2–4 – 1–14 | Carlow | Austin Stack Park |
| | M Conway 1–3, B Brick 1–0, L Boyle 0–1. | | C Hughes 0–5, C Doyle 1–0, R Dunbar 0–3, S Kavanagh 0–2, D Roberts 0–1, A Brennan 0–1, J Coady 0–1, M Brennan 0–1. | Referee: D O'Driscoll (Limerick) |

| 19 July 2008 Quarter-final | Kildare | 3–13 – 2–22 | Westmeath | St. Conleth's Park |
| | O Lynch 1–7, T Murphy 1–2, A McAndrew 1–0, M Moloney 0–2, R Hoban 0–1, P Divilly 0–1. | | B Murtagh 0–11, A Mitchell 1–1, P Dowdall 1–1, P Clarke 0–3, D McNicholas 0–2, J Shaw 0–1, D McCormack 0–1, E Price 0–1. | Referee: J Owens (Wexford) |

=== Semi-finals ===
| 26 July 2008 Semi-final | Westmeath | 1–19 – 0–12 | Derry | Cusack Park |
| | D. McNicholas 1–4, B. Murtagh 0–6, P. Clarke, R. Jackson, A. Mitchell and J. Shaw 0–2 each, E Price 0–1. | Report | M. Kirkpatrick 0–6, R. Convery 0–3, P. McCloskey 0–2 and O. McCloskey 0–1. |

| 26 July 2008 Semi-final | Mayo | 0–17 – 1–16 | Carlow | McHale Park |
| | A Freeman 0–8, K Higgins 0–4, S Barrett 0–1, N Murphy 0–1, M Cunnane 0–1, S Broderick 0–1, D McConn 0–1. | Report | S Kavanagh 0–4 (1 '65 3 frees ), J Rogers 1–0, R Dunbar 0–3, C Doyle 0–3, C Hughes 0–2 (frees ), J Coady 0–2, R Foley 0–1, M Brennan 0–1. | Referee: A Barrett (Galway) |

=== Final ===
| 3 August 2008 Final | Carlow | 3–22 – 4–16 | Westmeath | O'Connor Park |
| | C Doyle (2–1), C Hughes (0–7, 0-4f), R Foley (1–1), S Kavanagh (0–4, 0-3f), R Dunbar (0–3), M Brennan (0–2), A Gaul (0–1), R Coady (0–1), D Roberts (0–1). | Report | B Murtagh (2–10, 0-07f), D McNicholas (1–1), J Shaw (1–0), E Price (0–3), S Murphy (0–1), L Smyth (0–1), P Greville (0–1). | Referee: N Cosgrove (Tipperary) |

== Relegation play-offs ==
Due to a restructuring of the hurling championships the following year, the relegation playoffs were subsequently rendered meaningless as all four teams involved were relegated to the Nicky Rackard Cup for 2009.

| 26 July 2008 Quarter-final | Armagh | 0–15 – 1–9 | London | Parnell Park |
| | G Enright 0–6, B McCormack 0–5, K Christie 0–2, J Corvan 0–1, C Carville 0–1. | | M Mythen 1–2, M Finn 0–4, B McCormack 0–2, K McMullen 0–1. | Referee: G Duffy (Antrim) |

| 26 July 2008 Quarter-final | Roscommon | 3–6 – 3–19 | Meath | Cusack Park |
| | T Reddington 1–2, M Connaughton 1–1, G Fallon 1–1, S Sweeney 0–2. | | G O’Neill 2–4, N Horan 1–7, K Fagan 0–2, C Dunphy 0–2, M Burke 0–2, K Dowd 0–1, N Kirby 0–1. | Referee: T Carroll (Offaly) |

| 2 August 2008 Semi-final | London | 3–16 – 3–12 | Roscommon | O'Moore Park |
| | K McMullen 1–7, B McCormack 1–3, N O’Grady 1–1, C McDonnell 0–2, M Mythen 0–1, M Comerford 0–1, M O’Sullivan 0–1. | | T Reddington 2–1, S Sweeney 0–6, D Loughnane 1–0, M Kelly 0–1, M Keaveney 0–1, B Kelly 0–1, G Waldron 0–1, M Connaughton 0–1. | Referee: D Connolly (Kilkenny) |

| 9 August 2008 Final | Roscommon | 1–17 – 1–13 | Sligo | Páirc Seán Mac Diarmada |
| | S Sweeney 0–5, M Kelly 0–5, S Curley 0–4, T Reddington 1–0, J Moran 0–1, L Casey 0–1, B Hanley 0–1. | | C Herity 0–6, K Raymond 0–5, D Burke 1–1, L Reidy 0–1. | Referee: E Hassen (Derry) |

== Championship statistics ==
=== Top scorers ===
==== Overall ====
| Rank | Player | County | Tally | Total | Matches | Average |
|---|---|---|---|---|---|---|
| 1 | Brendan Murtagh | Westmeath | 2–37 | 43 | 5 | 8.60 |
| 2 | Alan Freeman | Mayo | 1–29 | 32 | 4 | 8.00 |
| 3 | Jonathan O'Neill | Wicklow | 0–31 | 31 | 3 | 10.33 |
| 4 | Paul Braniff | Down | 2–22 | 28 | 3 | 9.33 |
| 5 | Mike Conway | Kerry | 4–14 | 26 | 4 | 6.50 |

==== Single game ====
| Rank | Player | County | Tally | Total | Opposition |
|---|---|---|---|---|---|
| 1 | Brendan Murtagh | Westmeath | 2–10 | 16 | Carlow |
| 2 | Jonathan O'Neill | Wicklow | 1–11 | 14 | Roscommon |
| 3 | Mike Conway | Kerry | 3–3 | 12 | Meath |
| 3 | Ruairí Convery | Derry | 1–9 | 12 | Armagh |
| 5 | Paul Braniff | Down | 2–5 | 11 | Carlow |
| 5 | Michael Kirkpatrick | Derry | 0–11 | 11 | Down |
| 5 | Brendan Murtagh | Westmeath | 0–11 | 11 | Kildare |
| 8 | Ger O'Neill | Meath | 2–4 | 10 | Roscommon |
| 8 | Kevin McMullen | London | 1–7 | 10 | Roscommon |
| 8 | Oisín Lynch | Kildare | 1–7 | 10 | Westmeath |
| 8 | Paul Braniff | Down | 0–10 | 10 | Carlow |

== Miscellaneous ==
- Carlow won their 1st championship in 16 years, winning the 1992 All-Ireland Senior B Hurling Championship.

== See also ==
- 2008 All-Ireland Senior Hurling Championship
- 2008 Ulster Senior Hurling Championship
- 2008 Nicky Rackard Cup
