= Aaron Sheehan (hurler) =

Irish hurler

Personal information
- Native name: Aron Ó Síocháin (Irish)
- Born: 1999 (age 26–27) Mallow, County Cork, Ireland
- Occupation: Surveyor

Sport
- Sport: Hurling
- Position: Right corner-forward
Clubs
- Years: Club
- Mallow; Kilburns Gaels
Club titles
- London titles: 0
Inter-county
- Years: County
- 2018-present: London
Inter-county titles
- NHL: 0
- All Stars: 0

Aaron Sheehan (born 1994) is an Irish hurler who plays for London Championship club Kilburn Gaels and at inter-county level with the London senior hurling team. He usually lines out as a right corner-forward.

== Career statistics ==
As of match played 3 March 2019.

Team	Year	National League			Christy Ring Cup		Total	
Team	Year	Division	Apps	Score	Apps	Score	Apps	Score
London	2018	Division 2A	2	0-00	5	0-40	7	0-40
London	2019	Division 2A	5	0-35	4	0-17	9	0-52
Career total			7	0-35	9	0-57	16	0-92

== Honours ==
=== Team ===
Mallow

- Cork Premier Intermediate Football Championship (1): 2017

Cork

- Munster Intermediate Hurling Championship (1): 2015

=== Individual ===
Awards

- Christy Ring Cup Champion 15 (1): 2018
