= James Toher =

Irish hurler

Personal information
- Born: 1993 (age 32–33) Trim, County Meath, Ireland

Sport
- Sport: Hurling
- Position: Right wing-forward
Club
- Years: Club
- Trim
College(s)
- Years: College
- NUI Maynooth, UCD
Inter-county
- Years: County
- 2012- present: Meath

James Toher (born 1993) is an Irish hurler who plays centre back for the Meath senior team.

Born in Trim, County Meath, Toher first arrived on the inter-county scene at the age of sixteen when he first linked up with the Meath minor team before later joining the under-21 side. He made his senior debut during the 2012 league. Toher quickly became a regular member of the starting fifteen and has since won one Christy Ring Cup medal (2016). He captained his side to this historic win, lifting the cup twice in a single month after a controversial scoreline deemed correct by the referee was overturned by the CCC and a replay awarded.

At international level, Toher has played for the composite rules shinty-hurling team, captaining the U21s in 2013 and 2014 and made his senior debut in 2015. At club level, he plays with Trim.

== Honours ==
Meath

- Christy Ring Cup (1): 2016 (c)

Sporting positions
Preceded by Damien Healy	Meath Senior Hurling Captain; 2016	Succeeded by Incumbent
Achievements
Preceded by John Griffin	Christy Ring Cup Final winning captain 2016	Succeeded by Martin Kavanagh
