= Mikey Lee =

Irish hurler

Personal information
- Native name: Mícheál Ó Laoi (Irish)
- Born: 1993 (age 32–33) Bray, County Wicklow, Ireland

Sport
- Sport: Hurling
- Position: Centre-forward
Club
- Years: Club
- Bray Emmets
Club titles
- Wicklow titles: 3
Inter-county
- Years: County
- 2013–: Wicklow
Inter-county titles
- Leinster titles: 0
- All-Irelands: 0

Mikey Lee (born 1993) is an Irish hurler who plays as a centre-forward for the Wicklow senior team.

Born in Bray, County Wicklow, Lee arrived on the inter-county scene when he first linked up with the Wicklow minor team, before lining out with the under-21 side. He made his senior debut in the 2013 National Hurling League. Lee has since gone on to play a key role for the team, and has won one National League (Division 2B) medal. He has been a Christy Ring Cup runner-up on one occasion.

At club level Lee plays with Upperchurch–Drombane, County Tipperary and formerly with Bray Emmets County Wicklow.

== Honours ==
=== Team ===
Wicklow

- National League (Division 2B) (1): 2014
- All-Ireland Minor C Hurling Championship (1): 2011
