= Jonathan Maher =

Irish hurler

Personal information
- Native name: Seán Ó Meachair (Irish)
- Born: 1985 (age 40–41) Burgess, County Tipperary, Ireland
- Occupation: Solicitor

Sport
- Sport: Hurling
- Position: Right corner-forward
Clubs
- Years: Club
- Burgess; Kilburn Gaels
Club titles
- London titles: 1
Inter-county
- Years: County
- 2011-present: London
Inter-county titles
- Leinster titles: 0
- All-Irelands: 0
- NHL: 0
- All Stars: 1

Jonathan Maher (born 1985) is an Irish hurler who played as a right corner-forward for the London senior hurling team.

Maher began his inter-county career after emigrating from Ireland when he linked up with the London senior hurling team. As an inter-county hurler he has won one Christy Ring Cup winners' medal and one Nicky Rackard Cup winners' medal.

At club level Maher is a one-time county senior championship medalist with Kilburn Gaels. He previously played with Burgess.
