= 2019 Christy Ring Cup =

Hurling tournament

- Dates: 11 May – 22 June 2019
- Teams: 8
- Champions: Meath
- Runners-up: Down
- Official website: gaa.ie

The 2019 Christy Ring Cup was the 15th staging of the Christy Ring Cup hurling championship since its establishment by the Gaelic Athletic Association in 2005. It is the third tier of senior inter-county hurling.

The competition began on 11 May 2019 and ended on 22 June 2019.

Kildare were the 2018 Christy Ring champions, defeating London by 3-19 to 1-11 in the final. Kildare lost the relegation/promotion game against Antrim and remained in the Christy Ring Cup in 2019.

== Team changes ==
=== To Championship ===
Relegated from the Joe McDonagh Cup

- Meath

Promoted from the Nicky Rackard Cup

- Donegal

=== From Championship ===
Promoted to the Joe McDonagh Cup

- None

Relegated to the Nicky Rackard Cup

- Armagh
- Mayo

== Competition format ==
In 2018 the Christy Ring Cup changed to an initial stage of two groups of four teams, having previously been held as a double elimination tournament. The 2019 competition retains this structure.

The top two teams in the two groups advance to the semi-finals with the winners meeting in the final.

Relegation and promotion

The 2019 Christy Ring champions contest will be automatically promoted to the 2020 Joe McDonagh Cup. This is a change to the 2018 format, where the champions had to contest a promotion/relegation playoff against the second-from-bottom team in the Joe McDonagh Cup. (This was because the 2018 Joe McDonagh Cup was contested by six teams, instead of the intended five, and while one McDonagh team had to be relegated for 2019, allowances also had to be made for a Christy Ring Cup team to be promoted on merit.)

The bottom teams meet in a relegation playoff with the losers relegated to the following year's Nicky Rackard Cup.

== Group stage ==
=== Group 1 ===
==== Group 1 Table ====
Pos	Team	Pld	W	D	L	SF	SA	Diff	Pts	Qualification
1	Down	3	2	0	1	94	75	19	4	Advance to Knockout Stage
2	Derry	3	2	0	1	65	56	9	4	Advance to Knockout Stage
3	Wicklow	3	2	0	1	68	65	3	4	
4	Donegal	3	0	0	3	56	87	-31	0	Advance to Relegation Playoff

==== Round 1 ====
11 May 2019 Round 1	Down	2-14 (20) - (29) 3-20	Derry	Portaferry
				Referee: Séan Stack

12 May 2019 Round 1	Donegal	1-15 (18) - (24) 4-12	Wicklow

===== Round 2 =====
18 May 2019 Round 2	Derry	0-20 (20) - (17) 1-14	Donegal

18 May 2019 Round 2	Wicklow	2-19 (25) - (31) 2-25	Down

===== Round 3 =====
1 June 2019 Round 3	Donegal	2-15 (21) - (43) 7-22	Down
		Report

1 June 2019 Round 3	Derry	0-16 (16) - (19) 1-16	Wicklow
		Report

=== Group 2 ===
==== Group 2 Table ====
Pos	Team	Pld	W	D	L	SF	SA	Diff	Pts	Qualification
1	Meath	3	3	0	0	85	48	37	6	Advance to Knockout Stage
2	Roscommon	3	2	0	1	67	59	8	4	Advance to Knockout Stage
3	Kildare	3	1	0	2	59	75	-16	2	
4	London	3	0	0	3	53	82	-29	0	Advance to Relegation Playoff

==== Round 1 ====
19 May 2019 Round 1	Roscommon	0-20 (20) - (18) 1-15	Kildare

19 May 2019 Round 1	Meath	2-23 (29) - (13) 0-13	London

===== Round 2 =====
19 May 2019 Round 2	Kildare	1-13 (16) - (33) 2-27	Meath

19 May 2019 Round 2	London	2-12 (18) - (28) 1-25	Roscommon

===== Round 3 =====
1 June 2019 Round 3	Roscommon	0-19 (19) - (23) 0-23	Meath	Athleague
		Report

1 June 2019 Round 3	London	2-16 (22) - (25) 2-19	Kildare	Ruislip
		Report

== Knockout stage ==
=== Bracket ===
Semi-Finals
Down	3-18
Roscommon	1-15
Meath	3-24
Derry	2-18

Final
Down	2-15
Meath	4-19

=== Semi-finals ===
The Group 1 winners play the Group 2 runners-up and the Group 2 winners play the Group 1 runners-up.

8 June 2019	Down	3-18 (27) - (18) 1-15	Roscommon	Inniskeen
3:00pm		Report

8 June 2019	Meath	3-24 (33) - (24) 2-18	Derry	Athletic Grounds
2:00pm		Report

=== Final ===
The winners become the 2019 Christy Ring champions, and are automatically promoted to the 2020 Joe McDonagh Cup.

22 June 2019 Final	Down	2-15 4-19	Meath	Croke Park, Dublin
2:00 pm	P Sheehan 1-8 (1-0 pen, 0-6f, 0-1 ’65’), D Sands 1-1, M Fisher, D Toner 0-2 each, E Sands, O McManus 0-1 each.	Report	J Regan 0-9 (0-4f, 0-3 ’65’), A Gannon 2-3, N Potterton 1-1, C O’Sullivan 1-0, B Slevin 0-2, S Brennan, D Healy, A Douglas, J Keena 0-1 each.	Referee: Sean Stack (Dublin)

== Relegation playoff ==
The bottom teams in the two groups meet in a relegation playoff. The losers are relegated to the Nicky Rackard Cup and are replaced by the Nicky Rackard Champions.

8 June 2019	London	2-18 (24) - (17) 1-14	Donegal	Crossmaglen
2:00 pm

London retain Christy Ring Cup status for 2020 while Donegal are relegated to the 2020 Nicky Rackard Cup.

== Championship statistics ==
=== Top scorers ===
==== Overall ====
Rank	Player	Club	Tally	Total	Matches	Average
1						

==== In a single game ====
Rank	Player	Club	Tally	Total	Opposition
1					

== See also ==
- 2019 All-Ireland Senior Hurling Championship
- 2019 Leinster Senior Hurling Championship
- 2019 Munster Senior Hurling Championship
- 2019 Joe McDonagh Cup
- 2019 Nicky Rackard Cup
- 2019 Lory Meagher Cup
