= 2006 Christy Ring Cup =

- Dates: 3 June 2006 – 6 August 2006
- Teams: 8
- Champions: Antrim (1st title); Karl McKeegan (captain); Jim McKernan (manager)
- Runners-up: Carlow; Eoin Garvey (manager)

Tournament statistics
- Matches played: 24
- Top scorer(s): Paul Braniff (6-26)

The 2006 Christy Ring Cup is the second edition of the Christy Ring Cup since its establishment by the Gaelic Athletic Association in 2005 and is the second-tier of Hurling for senior county teams (the All-Ireland Senior Hurling Championship is the first-tier trophy). It is contested by ten GAA county teams ranked 13–22 in the 2006 All-Ireland Senior Hurling Championship. The cup began on 3 June 2006 and ended on 6 August 2006.

Westmeath were the defending champions, however, they availed of their automatic right of promotion to the All-Ireland Championship. Antrim and London contested the cup for the first time.

On 6 August 2006, Antrim won the Christy Ring Cup following a 5-13 to 1-7 defeat of Carlow in the final. This was their first Christy Ring Cup title.

Down's Paul Braniff was the championship's top scorer with 6-26.

Anthony Flaherty came out of retirement at the age of 49 to play for Roscommon against Meath in this competition. Flaherty had not played competitive hurling for eight years ("about 1998") at that time. Flaherty scored a goal against Meath in that game.

== Team changes ==
=== To Championship ===
Relegated from the All-Ireland Senior Hurling Championship

- Antrim

Promoted from the Nicky Rackard Cup

- London

=== From Championship ===
Promoted to the All-Ireland Senior Hurling Championship

- Westmeath

Relegated to the Nicky Rackard Cup

- Derry

== Teams ==
=== General Information ===
| County | Last Provincial title | Last All-Ireland title | Position in 2005 Championship | Appearance |
|---|---|---|---|---|
| Antrim | 2005 | — | Lost relegation playoff (All-Ireland Senior Hurling Championship) | 1st |
| Carlow | — | — | Semi-finals | 2nd |
| Down | 1997 | — | Runners-up | 2nd |
| Kerry | 1891 | 1891 | 3rd in Group B | 2nd |
| Kildare | — | — | Semi-finals | 2nd |
| London | — | 1901 | Champions (Nicky Rackard Cup) | 1st |
| Mayo | 1909 | — | 5th in Group B | 2nd |
| Meath | — | — | 3rd in Group A | 2nd |
| Roscommon | 1913 | — | 4th in Group A | 2nd |
| Wicklow | — | — | 4th in Group B | 2nd |

=== Personnel and kits ===
| County | Manager | Captain(s) | Sponsor |
|---|---|---|---|
| Antrim | | | |
| Carlow | | | |
| Down | | | |
| Kerry | | | |
| Kildare | | | |
| London | | | |
| Mayo | | | |
| Meath | | | |
| Roscommon | | | |
| Wicklow | | | |

== Format ==
Ten counties contested the 2006 competition for the Christy Ring Cup — the prize for the winners of Tier Two of the Guinness All-Ireland Hurling Championship. The inaugural competition involved the current middle rank of hurling counties:

- Leinster: Carlow, Kildare, Meath, Wicklow
- Ulster: Antrim, Down
- Connacht: Mayo, Roscommon
- Munster: Kerry
- Britain: London

These 10 counties are divided into two groups of five and play in a round-robin format, guaranteeing at least four games each. The eventual group winners and runners-up will qualify for the semi-finals of the Christy Ring Cup. The prize for the winners of the final will be promotion to Tier One of the Hurling Championship to contest the Liam MacCarthy Cup the following year.

The last team in each group will be involved in a relegation play-off with the eventual loser being relegated to the Nicky Rackard Cup.

== Group stage ==
=== Group A ===
| Pos | Team | Pld | W | D | L | SF | SA | Diff | Pts | Qualification |
|---|---|---|---|---|---|---|---|---|---|---|
| 1 | Down | 4 | 4 | 0 | 0 | 8-76 | 2-43 | 51 | 8 | Advance to Knockout Stage |
| 2 | Antrim | 4 | 3 | 0 | 1 | 15-70 | 2-48 | 61 | 6 | Advance to Knockout Stage |
| 3 | London | 4 | 2 | 0 | 2 | 7-45 | 4-59 | -5 | 4 | |
| 4 | Meath | 4 | 1 | 0 | 3 | 2-65 | 10-50 | -9 | 2 | |
| 5 | Roscommon | 4 | 0 | 0 | 4 | 2-35 | 16-91 | -98 | 0 | Advance to relegation playoff |

==== Results ====
| 10 June 2006 Round 1 | Roscommon | 0-10 - 2-10 | London | Athleague Sportsfield |
| | R Mulry 0-4, B Kelly 0-3, G Fallon 0-1, D Loughnane 0-1, A Cunniffe 0-1. | | S Malone 0-4, S Quinn 1-0, P Fagan 1-0, G Smith 0-1, M Gordon 0-1, F McMahon 0-1, B Foley 0-1, K McMullen 0-1, T Simms 0-1. | Referee: T McMahon (Fermanagh) |

| 10 June 2006 Round 1 | Down | 1-23 - 1-7 | Antrim | McKenna Park |
| | P Braniff 0-8, S Clarke 0-4, O Clarke 1-0, B McGourty 0-3, M Coulter 0-3, D Flynn 0-2, E Trainor 0-1. | | Brian McFall 0-4, K Kelly 1-0, John McIntosh 0-2, J Scullion 0-1. | Referee: G Devlin (Armagh) |

| 18 June 2006 Round 2 | Antrim | 9-39 - 0-5 | Roscommon | Casement Park |
| | P Richmond (3-4), J McIntosh (2-8), L Watson (2-3), J Scullion (1-5), M Dallas (0-7), B McFall (1-3), B Delargy (0-3), M Molloy (0-3), D McKillop (0-2), M Scullion (0-1). | | B Kelly (0-3), G Fallon (0-1), R Kennedy (0-1). |

| 18 June 2006 Round 2 | London | 3-15 - 0-20 | Meath | Emerald GAA Grounds |
| | S Malone (2-2), K McMullan (1-1), F McMahon (0-3), M O’Meara (0-3), D Smith (0-2), P Fagan (0-2), B Foley (0-1), S Quinn (0-1). | | T Reilly (0-11), K Dowd (0-3), J Keena (0-2), G O’Neil (0-2), S Clynch (0-1), K Fagan (0-1). |

| 24 June 2006 Round 3 | Down | 3-21 - 0-12 | Roscommon |
| | B Innes 1-3, S Clarke 1-4, E Clarke 1-2, P Braniff 0-5, E Trainor 0-3, S Wilson 0-2 B McGourty 0-1. | | R Mulry 0-7, B Kelly 0-2, A Cunniffe, G Fallon, Conniughton 0-1 each. |

| 24 June 2006 Round 3 | Antrim | 3-12 - 0-13 | Meath |
| | L Watson 2-4, 2-2 frees; J McIntosh 0-4; K Kelly 1-1; M Dallas 0-2; P McGill 0-1. | | T Riley 0-6 (2f '65), S Clynch, J Keena 0-2 each, M Cole, P Coone, P Donnelly 0-1 each. |

| 8 July 2006 Round 4 | Down | 2-15 - 0-11 | Meath | McKenna Park |
| | Paul Braniff 2-2, S Clarke 0-5, B McGourty 0-4, E Trainor 0-2, Gabriel Clarke 0-1, S Wilson 0-1. | | N Hackett 0-4, M Cole 0-2, K Fegan 0-2, J Keenan 0-1, E Keogh 0-1, S Heavey 0-1. | Referee: T Mahon (Fermanagh) |

| 8 July 2006 Round 4 | Antrim | 2-12 - 1-7 | London | Casement Park |
| | Paddy Richmond 1-2, Johnny McIntosh 1-2, Brian McFall 0-5, M Scullion 0-1, K Kelly 0-1, J Scullion 0-1. | | B Foley 1-1, J Ryan 0-2, D Smith 0-2, E Phelan 0-1, P Fagan 0-1. | Referee: G McGrath (Westmeath) |

| 15 July 2006 Round 5 | London | 1-13 - 2-17 | Down | Emerald GAA Grounds |
| | E Conway 0-4, J Ryan 1-0, P Fagan 0-2, S Malone 0-2, F McMahon 0-2, K McMullan 0-1, M O’Meara 0-1, T Simms 0-1. | | Paul Braniff 0-5, E Trainor 0-5, S Clarke 1-1, S Murray 0-2, S Wilson 0-1, B McGourty 0-1, G Adair 0-1, M Braniff 0-1. | Referee: C McAllister (Cork) |

| 15 July 2006 Round 5 | Meath | 2-21 - 2-8 | Roscommon | Páirc Tailteann |
| | P Coone 1-5, K Fagan 1-3, T Reilly 0-5, S Clynch 0-3, J Keenan 0-2, J Watters 0-2, N Hackett 0-1. | | M Connaughton 0-5, A Flaherty 1-0, T Reddington 1-0, G Waldron 0-1, A Cunniffe 0-1, M Kelly 0-1. |

=== Group B ===
| Pos | Team | Pld | W | D | L | SF | SA | Diff | Pts | Qualification |
|---|---|---|---|---|---|---|---|---|---|---|
| 1 | Kildare | 4 | 4 | 0 | 0 | 9-62 | 7-43 | 25 | 8 | Advance to Knockout Stage |
| 2 | Carlow | 4 | 2 | 1 | 1 | 7-55 | 8-37 | 15 | 5 | Advance to Knockout Stage |
| 3 | Mayo | 4 | 2 | 0 | 2 | 4-34 | 7-48 | -23 | 4 | |
| 4 | Wicklow | 4 | 1 | 1 | 2 | 6-45 | 9-41 | -5 | 3 | |
| 5 | Kerry | 4 | 0 | 0 | 4 | 7-34 | 2-61 | -12 | 0 | Advance to relegation playoff |

==== Results ====
| 3 June 2006 Round 1 | Wicklow | 2-8 - 1-11 | Carlow | Pearse Park |
| | J Keogh 1-4, D Moran 1-0, D Hyland 0-1, G Doran 0-1, T McGrath 0-1, A O’Brien 0-1. | | D Roberts 1-1, D Runbar 0-4, P Cody 0-2, B Lawler 0-1, C Hughes 0-1, P Kehoe 0-1, B Cox 0-1. |

| 3 June 2006 Round 1 | Kerry | 2-12 - 1-16 | Kildare | Austin Stack Park |
| | M Boyle 2-0, M Conway 0-6, J Egan 0-5, J M Dooley 0-1. | | B Whyte 0-9, D Harney 1-2, P Reidy 0-2, C Divilly 0-1, C Buggy 0-1, O Lynch 0-1. |

| 10 June 2006 Round 2 | Kildare | 3-14 - 2-11 | Wicklow | St. Conleth's Park |
| | B White 0-7, A McAndrew 1-3, D Harney 1-0, B Byrne 1-0, C Divilly 0-1, P Reidy 0-1, M Moloney 0-1. | | A O'Brien 1-2, L Glynn 1-1, J Keogh 0-3, J Murphy 0-2, D Hyland 0-1, G Doran 0-1, E Glynn 0-1. | Referee: D Magee (Down) |

| 10 June 2006 Round 2 | Carlow | 3-15 - 0-5 | Mayo | Dr. Cullen Park |
| | B Lawlor 1-3, D Shaw 1-0, A Brennan 1-0, P Coady 0-3, S McMahon 0-2, D Roberts 0-2, P Kehoe 0-1, R Foley 0-1, E Coady 0-1, S Kavanagh 0-1. | | K Higgens 0-2, S Broderick 0-1, S Coyne 0-1, P Higgins 0-1. | Referee: C McAllister (Cork) |

| 24 June 2006 Round 3 | Mayo | 1-12 - 2-19 | Kildare | McHale Park |
| | P Higgins 1-1, S Broderick 0-6, S Coyle, D McDonald, P McConn, S Hunt, P Broderick 0-1 each. | Report | B White 1-7, A McAndrew 1-1, M Moloney 0-3, O Lynch 0-2, M Dowd 0-2, E Hannon, P Reidy, C Divill, B Byrne, D Harley 0-1 each. |

| 24 June 2006 Round 3 | Kerry | 2-7 - 0-15 | Wicklow | Austin Stack Park |
| | M Conway 1-4, M Boyle 1-0, A Keane, J Dooley, M Hanafin 0-1 each. | Report | J Keogh 0-6, L Glynn 0-2, A O'Brien 0-2, J O'Neill 0-2, D Moran, E Glynn, E Dunne 0-1 each. |

| 8 July 2006 Round 4 | Kerry | 0-4 - 0-8 | Mayo | Austin Stack Park |
| | J Egan 0-2 (2f), B O'Donovan and M Boyle 0-1 each | | K Higgins 0-4 (3f), S Barrett 0-2 (2f), P Higgins and D McDonnell 0-1 each. |

| 8 July 2006 Round 4 | Kildare | 3-13 - 2-7 | Carlow | St. Conleth's Park |
| | B White 0-7 5f, C Divilly 2-0, B Byrne 1-0, DHarney 0-3, O Lynch 0-2, M O'Sowd 0-1. | | P Coady 1-1 both f, A Brennan 1-0, D Roberts 1f and P Keogh 0-2 each, D Murphy and B Lawler 0-1 each. |

| 15 July 2006 Round 5 | Carlow | 1-22 - 3-11 | Kerry | Dr. Cullen Park |
| | P Coady 0-11, P Keohoe 1-4, D Murphy 0-3, B Lawler 0-2, R Foley 0-1, M Keating 0-1. | | I McCarthy 1-4, M Conway 1-2, A Keane 1-0, S Mounsell 0-2, N Whelan 0-1, G O'Grady 0-1, A Boyle 0-1. | Referee: C Groome (Offaly) |

| 15 July 2006 Round 5 | Mayo | 3-9 - 2-10 | Wicklow | James Stephens Park |
| | P Broderick 2-2, S Barrett 1-0, S Broderick 0-2, D McDonald 0-2, D McConn 0-1, K Healey 0-1, A Freeman 0-1. | | A Brennan 1-3, G Doran 1-0, E Flynn 0-3, J Murphy 0-2, J Bermingham 0-1, D O'Haolain 0-1. |

== Knockout stage ==
=== Bracket ===
Semi-Finals
Kildare | 0-06
Antrim | 2-21
Down | 5-08
Carlow | 2-19

Final
Antrim | 5-13
Carlow | 1-07

=== Relegation final ===
| 22 July 2006 Relegation final | Kerry | 2-19 - 1-7 | Roscommon | Cusack Park |
| | M Conway 2-6, B Donovan 0-4, M Boyle 0-4, I McCarthy 0-2, M Quilter 0-1, A Keane 0-1, P Lyons 0-1. | | M Kelly 1-1, B Hanley 0-2, R Mulry 0-2, M Connaughton 0-2. |

=== Semi-finals ===
| 23 July 2006 Semi-final | Kildare | 0-6 - 2-21 | Antrim | Cusack Park |
| | B White (0-3, two frees, '65), PB Byrne, D Harney, O Lynch (0-1 each). | Report | L Watson (0-12, seven frees, four '65s), P Richmond (1-2), B McFall (1-1), M Scullion, K Kelly (0-2 each), C Cunning, J McIntosh (0-1 each). |

| 23 July 2006 Semi-final | Down | 5-8 - 2-19 | Carlow | Cusack Park |
| | P Braniff (4-6, three frees), E Clarke (1-1), S Wilson (0-1, free) | Report | P Coady (0-6, three frees, '65), D Murphy (2-0), B Lawler (0-5), R Foley (0-3), F Foley, C Hughes, A Brennan, P Kehoe, K English (0-1 each). |

=== Final ===
| 6 August 2006 Final | Antrim | 5-13 - 1-7 | Carlow | Croke Park |
| | J McIntosh (2-4, four frees), B McFall (1-2), K Kelly (1-1), J Scullion (1-0), P Richmond (0-2), M Molloy (0-2, one free, one 65), P McGill (0-1), B Delargy (0-1). | Report | F Foley (1-0, free), P Coady (0-3, frees), D Roberts (0-1), R Foley (0-2), S McMahon (0-1). | Referee: J McGrath (Westmeath) |

== Stadia and locations ==
| County | Location | Province | Stadium(s) | Capacity |
|---|---|---|---|---|
| Neutral Venue | Dublin | Leinster | Croke Park | 82,300 |
| Antrim | Belfast | Ulster | Casement Park | 31,661 |
| Carlow | Carlow | Leinster | Dr Cullen Park | 21,000 |
| Down | Newry | Ulster | Páirc Esler | 20,000 |
| Kerry | Tralee | Munster | Austin Stack Park | 12,000 |
| Kildare | Newbridge | Leinster | St Conleth's Park | 8,200 |
| London | South Ruislip | Britain | McGovern Park | 3,000 |
| Mayo | Castlebar | Connacht | MacHale Park | 25,369 |
| Meath | Navan | Leinster | Páirc Tailteann | 11,000 |
| Roscommon | Roscommon | Connacht | Dr Hyde Park | 25,000 |
| Wicklow | Aughrim | Leinster | Aughrim County Ground | 7,000 |

== Championship Statistics ==
=== Top scorers ===
- Paul Branniff (Down) 6-26 (44)
- Johnny McIntosh (Antrim) 5-21 (36)
- Liam Watson (Antrim) 4-19 (31)
- Mikey Conway (Kerry) 4-18 (30)
- Pat Coady (Carlow) 1-26 (29)
- Paddy Richmond (Antrim) 5-10 (25)
- Brian McFall (Antrim) 3-15 (24)

== Miscellaneous ==
- Antrim won a championship double in 2006 by winning the Christy Ring Cup and the Ulster Senior Hurling Championship.

== See also ==
- 2006 All-Ireland Senior Hurling Championship
- 2006 Munster Senior Hurling Championship
- 2006 Leinster Senior Hurling Championship
- 2006 Ulster Senior Hurling Championship
- 2006 Nicky Rackard Cup (Tier 3)
