= 2014 Christy Ring Cup =

- Dates: 3 May – 7 June 2013
- Teams: 8
- Champions: Kildare (1st title); Niall Ó Muineacháin (captain); Brian Lawlor (manager)
- Runners-up: Kerry; John Egan (captain); Éamonn Kelly (manager)

Tournament statistics
- Matches played: 15

The 2014 Christy Ring Cup was the tenth staging of the Christy Ring Cup hurling championship since its establishment by the Gaelic Athletic Association in 2005. The cup competition began on 3 May 2014 and ended on 7 June 2014.

Down were the defending champions; however, they lost their opening two games and avoided relegation by defeating Armagh in a play-off, before being awarded the final promotion/relegation playoff when Tyrone withdrew.

== Team changes ==
=== To Championship ===
Relegated from the All-Ireland Senior Hurling Championship

- None

Promoted from the Nicky Rackard Cup

- None

=== From Championship ===
Promoted to the All-Ireland Senior Hurling Championship

- None

Relegated to the Nicky Rackard Cup

- None

== Teams ==
=== General Information ===
County	Last Cup title	Last Provincial title	Last All-Ireland title	Position in 2013 Championship	Appearance
Armagh	—	—	—	Round 2	4th
Derry	—	2001	—	Quarter-finals	9th
Down	2013	1997	—	Champions	10th
Kerry	2011	1891	1891	Runners-up	10th
Kildare	—	—	—	Semi-finals	10th
Mayo	—	1909	—	Round 2	10th
Meath	—	—	—	Semi-finals	9th
Wicklow	—	—	—	Quarter-finals	10th

=== Personnel and kits ===
County	Manager	Captain(s)	Sponsor	Grounds
Armagh	John Lennon		Rainbow Communications	Athletic Grounds
Derry	Ger Rogan		Specialist Joinery Group	Owenbeg Centre of Excellence
Down	Gerard Monan		Canal Court Hotel	Páirc Esler
Kerry	Éamonn Kelly		Kerry Group	Austin Stack Park
Kildare	Brian Lawlor		Brady's Family Ham	St. Conleth's Park
Mayo	Christy Phillips		Elvery's	Elvery's MacHale Park
Meath	Cillian Farrell		MyClubShop.ie	St. Loman's Park
Wicklow	Casey O'Brien		WH Scott Lifting	Pearse Park

== Round 1 ==
=== Matches ===
3 May 2014 Round 1	Kerry	4-31 - 0-11	Derry	Austin Stack Park
13:00	S Nolan (1-10, 0-5f), P Boyle (1-3), D Collins (1-2), C Harty (1-2), M Boyle (0-3), D Butler (0-3), J Egan (0-2), S Weir (0-2), D Dineen (0-1), T Casey (0-1), P O'Connor (0-1), J Leahy (0-1).	Report	A Grant (0-5, 4f), K Hinphey (0-2), R Convery (0-2), P Cleary (0-1), S Farren (0-1f).	Referee: T Carroll (Offaly)

3 May 2014 Round 1	Meath	0-17 - 1-8	Down	St. Loman's Park
14:30	S Clynch (0-7,5fs); W McGrath (0-3), S Morris (0-3), C King (0-2), J Toher (0-1), D Reilly (0-1).	Report	D Toner (1-1), P Sheehan (0-3, 2fs), C O'Prey (0-1), D Hughes (0-1), S Nicholson (0-1), C Woods (0-1f).	Referee: J Heffernan (Wexford)

3 May 2014 Round 1	Mayo	0-20 - 1-14	Armagh	Elvery's MacHale Park
14:30	K Feeney (0-12, 7f), D Gallagher (0-3f), F Boland (0-3), G Nolan (0-1), D McDonnell (0-1).	Report	D Coulter (0-8, 7f), A McGuinness (1-1), C Corvan (0-2), F Bradley (0-1), K McKernan (0-1), C McKee (0-1).	Referee: D O'Driscoll (Limerick)

3 May 2014 Round 1	Kildare	1-27 - 2-24 (AET)	Wicklow	St. Conleth's Park
14:30	G Keegan (1-5), M Fitzgerald (0-6), P Divilly (0-6, 2f), T Murphy (0-4), D Harney (0-2), B Deay (0-2), R Casey (0-1), R McLoughney (0-1).	Report	M Lee (2-14, 0-7f, 1'65, 1sl), A O'Brien (0-5), S Byrne (0-2), W O'Gorman (0-1), D Staunton (0-1), A Byrne (0-1).	Referee: P O'Dwyer (Carlow)

10 May 2014 Round 1 replay	Wicklow	3-13 - 1-20	Kildare	Pearse Park
	M Lee (1-8, 0-6f), C Moorehouse (1-1), A O'Brien (1-0), J O'Neill (0-3), G Bermingham (0-1).	Report	P Divilly (0-8, 7f), G Keegan (1-4), T Murphy (0-3), B Deay (0-2), M Fitzgerald (0-1), P Downey (0-1), M Delaney (0-1).	Referee: D Hughes

== Round 2 ==
=== Round 2A ===
10 May 2014 Round 2A	Mayo	0-15 - 0-16	Meath	Elvery's MacHale Park
	K Feeney (0-10, 9f), F Boland (0-2), K Higgins (0-1), S Regan (0-1), D Gallagher (0-1, 1f).	Report	S Clynch (0-8, 5f, 2 65), W McGrath (0-2), C King (0-2), J Meyler (0-1), S Whitty (0-1), S Heavey (0-1), D Doran (0-1).	Referee: J O'Brien (Tipperary)

17 May 2013 Round 2A	Kildare	1-16 - 3-18	Kerry	St. Conleth's Park
	P Divilly 0-5 (4fs), G Keegan 0-3, P Dermody 1-0 (pen), D Harney, M Delaney, E O'Neill (1 sideline) 0-2 each, M Fitzgerald, B Deay 0-1 each.	Report	S Nolan 1-8 (6fs, 0-1 '65', 1-0 pen), P Boyle 2-2, D O'Connell, J Egan 0-2 each, M Boyle, D Butler, P Lucid, S Weir 0-1 each.	Referee: S Cleere (Kilkenny)

=== Round 2B ===
10 May 2013 Round 2B	Derry	2-16 - 3-12	Down	Owenbeg Centre of Excellence
	R Convery (0-10, 9f, 1'65), S Farren (1-1), O McCloskey (1-0), B Rodgers (0-2), K Hinphey (0-2), A Grant (0-1).	Report	J Coyle (1-4, 0-2f), D Toner (1-1), J McCusker (1-0), C Woods (0-3, 2f, 1'65), C O'Prey (0-1), S Nicholson (0-1), M Ennis (0-1), P Sheehan (0-1).	Referee: O Elliott

17 May 2014 Round 2B	Armagh	3-13 - 3-19	Wicklow	Athletic Grounds
	D Coulter 2-5 (2-0 pens, 4fs), C Corvan 1-0, F Bradley 0-3, J Corvan, R Gaffney 0-2 each, P Bradley 0-1.	Report	A O'Brien 2-4, M Lee 1-7 (0-4f), J O'Neill 0-3, C Moorehouse, D Staunton 0-2 each, E Kearns 0-1.	Referee: S Keane (Galway)

== Quarter-finals ==
24 May 2014 Quarter-final	Wicklow	0-14 - 1-15	Mayo	Pearse Park
	M Lee 0-9 (8f), C Moorehouse 0-3, A O'Brien, W O'Gorman 0-1 each.	Report	K Feeney 0-7 (5f), S Hoban 0-3, B Hunt 1-0, K Higgins 0-2, F Boland, D McDonnell, P O'Flynn 0-1 each.	Referee: S Cleere (Kilkenny)

24 May 2014 Quarter-final	Derry	0-10 - 2-16	Kildare	Owenbeg Centre of Excellence
	R Convery (0-5, 4f), B Og McGilligan (0-1), P McCloskey (0-1), B Rogers (0-1), M O'Hagan (0-1), D O'Neill (0-1).	Report	R McLoughney (0-4), G Keegan (0-4), B Deay (1-0), R Kelly (1-0), P Divilly (0-3, 2f), M Moloney (0-1), M Fitzgerald (0-1), T Murphy (0-1), R Casey (0-1), W Greene (0-1).	Referee: L McAuley

== Semi-finals ==
31 May 2014 Semi-final	Mayo	1-18 - 3-20	Kerry	Elvery's MacHale Park
13:00	K Feeney 0-8 (6fs, 1'65), S Regan 1-3, B Hunt 0-2, F Boland, S Boland, C Charlton, B Higgins, D O'Brien (1f) 0-1 each.	Report	J Egan 0-7 (4fs), S Nolan and P Boyle 1-2 each, D Butler 1-1, D O'Connell 0-3, S Weir 0-2, B Murphy, M Boyle and T Flynn 0-1 each.	Referee: J Keane (Galway)

31 May 2014 Semi-final	Meath	0-14 - 1-18	Kildare	St. Loman's Park
14:30	J Toher (0-4fs), S Clynch (0-2, 1f), D Doran (0-2), D Healy (0-2), C King (0-1), A Gannon (0-1), S Heavey (0-1), Patrick Connelly (0-1).	Report	P Divilly (0-9, 7fs), T Murphy (1-2), B Deay (0-3), M Fitzgerald (0-2), R Kelly (0-1), G Keegan (0-1).	Referee: J O'Brien (Tipperary)

== Final ==
7 June 2014 Final	Kerry	2-22 - 4-18	Kildare	Croke Park
16:00	S Nolan 1-4, P Boyle 1-2, D Butler 0-5 (2f), J Egan 0-4 (2f), J Griffin, C Harty 0-3 each, T Casey 0-1.	Report	G Keegan 1-4 (0-1f), P Divilly 0-7 (5f), B Deay 1-3, R McLoughney 1-1, P Dermody 1-0, M Fitzgerald 0-2.	Referee: S Cleere (Kilkenny)

== Relegation play-off ==
31 May 2014 Relegation play-off	Down	5-24 - 2-15	Armagh	Páirc Esler
14:30	J Coyle (1-5, 4f), J McCusker (2-1), M Turley (1-2), M Magee (1-1), M Ennis (0-4), S Nicholson (0-4, 2f), D Hughes (0-3), C O'Prey (0-2), C Woods (0-1f), B Nicholson (0-1).	Report	D Coulter (0-7, 5f, 1 '65'), J Corvan (1-2), E McGuinness (1-0), K McKernan (0-2), O Curry (0-1), R Gaffney (0-1), C Carvill (0-1), A McGuinness (0-1).	Referee: G McGrath (Dublin)

=== Promotion play-off ===
21 June 2014 Promotion play-off	Down	w/o — scr.	Tyrone

== Championship statistics ==
=== Scoring ===
- First goal of the championship: Shane Nolan for Kerry against Derry (3 May 2014)
- Widest winning margin: 32 points
  - Kerry 4-31 - 0-11 Derry (3 May 2014)
- Most goals in a match: 7
  - Down 5-24 - 2-15 Armagh (31 May 2014)
- Most points in a match: 51
  - Kildare 1-27 - 2-24 Wicklow (3 May 2014)
- Most goals by one team in a match: 5
  - Down 5-24 - 2-15 Armagh (31 May 2014)
- Highest aggregate score: 60
  - Kildare 1-27 - 2-24 Wicklow (3 May 2014)
  - Down 5-24 - 2-15 Armagh (31 May 2014)
- Lowest aggregate score: 28
  - Meath 0-17 - 1-8 Down (3 May 2014)
- Most goals scored by a losing team: 3
  - Wicklow 3-13 - 1-20 Kildare (10 May 2014)
  - Armagh 3-13 - 3-19 Wicklow (17 May 2014)

=== Top Scorer ===
==== Overall ====
Rank	Player	County	Tally	Total	Matches	Average
1	Mikey Lee	Wicklow	4-38	50	4	12.50
2	Paul Divilly	Kildare	0-48	48	6	8.00
3	Kenny Feeney	Mayo	0-37	37	4	9.25
4	Shane Nolan	Kerry	4-24	36	4	9.00

==== Single game ====
Rank	Player	County	Tally	Total	Opposition
1	Mikey Lee	Wicklow	2-14	20	Kildare
2	Shane Nolan	Kerry	1-10	13	Derry
3	Kenny Feeney	Mayo	0-12	12	Armagh
4	Declan Coulter	Armagh	2-5	11	Wicklow
4	Mikey Lee	Wicklow	1-8	11	Kildare
4	Shane Nolan	Kerry	1-8	11	Kildare
7	Andy O'Brien	Wicklow	2-4	10	Armagh
7	Mikey Lee	Wicklow	1-7	10	Armagh
7	Kenny Feeney	Mayo	0-10	10	Meath
7	Ruairí Convery	Derry	0-10	10	Down

=== Clean sheets ===
Rank	Goalkeeper	County	Clean sheets
1	Donal O'Brien	Mayo	2
1	Charlie Bird	Meath	2
1	Paul Dermody	Kildare	2
2	Tadhg Flynn	Kerry	1
2	Stephen Keith	Down	1
2	Simon Doherty	Armagh	1
