= 2013 Christy Ring Cup =

- Dates: 4 May – 8 June 2013
- Teams: 8
- Champions: Down; Paul Braniff (captain); Gerard Monan (manager)
- Runners-up: Kerry; Paud Costello (captain); Tom Howard (manager)

Tournament statistics
- Matches played: 14

The 2013 Christy Ring Cup was the ninth staging of the Christy Ring Cup hurling championship since its establishment by the Gaelic Athletic Association in 2005. The cup competition began on 4 May 2013 and ended on 8 June 2013.

London were defending champions, however, they were promoted to the All-Ireland Senior Hurling Championship. Down won the title following a 3–16 to 2–17 victory over Kerry in the final.

== Team changes ==
=== To Championship ===
Relegated from the All-Ireland Senior Hurling Championship

- None

Promoted from the Nicky Rackard Cup

- Armagh

=== From Championship ===
Promoted to the All-Ireland Senior Hurling Championship

- London

Relegated to the Nicky Rackard Cup

- None

== Teams ==
=== General Information ===
County	Last Cup title	Last Provincial title	Last All-Ireland title	Position in 2012 Championship	Appearance
Armagh	—	—	—	Champions (Nicky Rackard Cup)	3rd
Derry	—	2001	—	Quarter-finals	8th
Down	—	1997	—	Semi-finals	9th
Kerry	2011	1891	1891	Round 2	9th
Kildare	—	—	—	Quarter-finals	9th
Mayo	—	1909	—	Round 2	9th
Meath	—	—	—	Semi-finals	8th
Wicklow	—	—	—	Runners-up	9th

=== Personnel and kits ===
County	Manager	Captain(s)	Sponsor
Armagh			
Derry			
Down			
Kerry			
Kildare			
Mayo			
Meath			
Wicklow			

== Round 1 ==
=== Matches ===
4 May 2013 Round 1	Down	2-17 - 3-16	Kerry	Páirc Esler
14:30	J Coyle 1-4, P Braniff 0-4 (2f, 1 '65), D Toner 1-1, G Johnston, C Woods, K McGarry 0-2 each, P Sheehan, M Turlet 0-1 each.		S Nolan 0-9 (7f), W O'Dwyer, B O'Leary 1-2 each, A Boyle 1-0, C Harty, D Collins, L Boyle 0-1 each.	Referee: A Stapleton (Laois)

4 May 2013 Round 1	Derry	1-11 - 1-10	Wicklow	Owenbeg
15:00	S Farren 0-5 (frees), O McCloskey 1-1, A Grant 0-4, P Cleary 0-1.		A O'Brien 1-3 (1-0 pen, 0-2 frees), J O'Neill 0-3 (1f), E Glynn 0-2, M Lee, M Henderson 0-1 each.	Referee: O Elliott (Antrim)

4 May 2013 Round 1	Meath	1-20 - 2-10	Armagh	St. Loman's Park
15:00	S Clynch 0-6 (0-2 frees, 2 '65s), A Gannon 0-5, B Slevin 1-1, M O'Sullivan 0-4, S Morris, P Durnin, S Heavey, E Marsh 0-1 each.		D Coulter 0-5 (0-4 frees), C Corvan 1-1, C Reid 1-0, C Carville 0-2, K McKiernan, J Burke 0-1 each.	Referee: C Browne (Galway)

4 May 2013 Round 1	Kildare	1-23 - 0-16	Mayo	St. Conleth's Park
15:00	B Deay 1-3, G Keegan, P Divilly 0-7 each, D Harnedy, D Butler 0-2 each, T Murphy E O'Neill 0-1.		S Regan 0-11 (10fs, 1 '65), P O'Flynn 0-2 (1f, 1 '65), K Higgins 0-2, D McDonnell 0-1.	Referee: S Hourigan (Limerick)

== Round 2 ==
=== Round 2A ===
11 May 2013 Round 2A	Kildare	1-16 - 0-22 (AET)	Meath	St. Conleth's Park
16:15	P Divilly 0-9 (5fs, 2 65s), G Keegan 1-3 (1f, 1 65), K Divilly 0-2, D Harney 0-2.	Report	S Clynch 0-11 (9fs, 1 65), M O’Sullivan 0-3, P Conneely 0-2, J Kelly 0-1, S Heavey 0-1, S Morris 0-1, A Gannon 0-1, P Durnin 0-1, B Hanley.	Referee: F Horan (Tipperary)

11 May 2013 Round 2B	Kerry	0-14 - 0-8	Derry	Austin Stack Park
13:00	S Nolan 0-9 (0-7 frees), J Egan 0-2, D O’Connell 0-1 free, D Dineen and C Harty 0-1 each.	Report	P Henry 0-4 (frees), B Rodgers 0-2, K Hinphey and C McSorley 0-1 each.

=== Round 2B ===
11 May 2013 Round 2B	Wicklow	4-19 - 3-10	Mayo	Pearse Park
15:00	A O’Brien 3-10 (one free), J O’Neill 1-3, J Henderson 0-1, S Kelly 0-1, R Keddy 0-1, E Kearns 0-1, G Bermingham 0-1, C Moorehouse 0-1.	Report	K Feeney 3-3, S Regan 0-3, S Hoban 0-1, D McTigue 0-1, D Gallagher 0-1, B Hunt 0-1.	Referee: P O'Dwyer (Carlow)

11 May 2013 Round 2B	Armagh	1-11 - 1-20	Down	St. Oliver Plunkett Park
15:00	D Coulter (0-9), D Carvill (1-0), C Carvill (0-2).	Report	P Braniff (0-8), J Coyle (0-5), G Johnson (0-4), D Hughes (1-1), K McGarry (0-1), D Toner (0-1).

== Quarter-finals ==
=== Matches ===
18 May 2013 Quarter-final	Wicklow	2-10 - 0-17	Kildare	Pearse Park
15:00	A O'Brien 1-6 (65 5f), C Moorehouse 1-0, J Henderson 0-2, S Kinsella 0-1, E Kearns 0-1.	Report	G Keegan 0-6 (3f), D Harney 0-5 (3f), T Murphy 0-2, B Deay 0-1, N Ó Muineacháin 0-1, D Butler 0-1, M Purcell 0-1.	Referee: P Murphy (Carlow)

18 May 2013 Quarter-final	Down	3-7 - 0-9	Derry	Páirc Esler
15:00	P Braniff 1-3 (2f), M Turley 1-1, J McCusker 1-0, D Toner, G Johnston, S Nicholas 0-1 each.	Report	P Henry 0-4 (2f), O McCloskey, B Rodgers, T McCloskey, A Kelly, K Hinphey 0-1 each.	Referee: D Hughes (Carlow)

== Semi-finals ==
=== Matches ===
25 May 2013 Semi-final	Kerry	1-14 - 0-11	Kildare	Austin Stack Park
15:00	S Nolan (1-4, 2f), C Harty (0-3), D Collins (0-2), W O'Dwyer (0-2), A Boyle (0-1), B O'Leary (0-1), D O'Connell (0-1).	Report	P Divilly (0-6, 1'65, 4f), M Moloney (0-1), M Purcell (0-1), G Keegan (0-1), R Kelly (0-1), M Delaney (0-1).	Referee: F Horgan

25 May 2013 Semi-final	Meath	1-25 - 2-22 (AET)	Down	St. Loman's Park
15:00	S Clynch (0-15, 10fs, 2 65s), P Durnin (1-5), A Gannon (0-2), S Morris (0-1), M O'Sullivan (0-1), E Marsh (0-1).	Report	P Braniff (2-5, 0-3fs), C Woods (0-4, 2fs, 2 65s), D Toner (0-4), D Hughes (0-3), C Coulter (0-3), G Johnston (0-1), F Conway (0-1), P Sheehan (0-1).	Referee: S Hourigan (Limerick)

1 June 2013 Semi-final replay	Down	0-23 - 1-10	Meath	McKenna Park
15:00	P Braniff 0-8 (6f, 1 '65); K McGarry, P Sheehan 0-3 each; F Conway, D Hughes, D Toner 0-2 each; C Coulter, G Johnston, J Coyle 0-1 each.	Report	S Clynch (3f) 0-5; M O'Sullivan 1-1; S Morris, J Kelly, J Meyler 0-1 each.	Referee: T Carroll (Offaly)

== Final ==
8 June 2013 Final	Kerry	2-17 - 3-16	Down	Croke Park
	S Nolan (1-9), P Boyle (1-3), W O'Dwyer (0-2), A Boyle (0-1), B O'Leary (0-1), G O'Brien (0-1).	Report	G Johnson (2-1), P Braniff (0-6), S Nicholson (1-2), J Coyle (0-2), C Woods (0-2), D Hughes (0-1), D Toner (0-1), J McCusker (0-1).	Referee: C Browne (Galway)

== Stadia and locations ==
Team	Location	Stadium	Stadium capacity
Derry	Derry	Celtic Park (Derry)	5,000
Down	Newry	Páirc Esler	20,000
Kerry	Tralee	Austin Stack Park	18,000
Kildare	Newbridge	St. Conleth's Park	4,000
London	Ruislip	Emerald GAA Grounds	5,000
Mayo	Castlebar	McHale Park	49,000
Meath	Navan	Páirc Tailteann	10,000
Wicklow	Aughrim	Aughrim County Ground	10,000

== Statistics ==
=== Top scorers ===
==== Season ====
Rank	Player	County	Tally	Total	Matches	Average
1	Paul Braniff	Down	3-34	43	6	7.16
2	Shane Nolan	Kerry	2-31	37	4	9.33
2	Stephen Clynch	Meath	0-37	37	4	9.25
4	Andy O'Brien	Wicklow	5-19	34	3	11.33

==== Single game ====
Rank	Player	County	Tally	Total	Opposition
1	Andy O'Brien	Wicklow	3-10	19	Mayo
2	Stephen Clynch	Meath	0-15	15	Down
3	Kenny Feeney	Mayo	3-3	12	Wicklow
3	Shane Nolan	Kerry	1-9	12	Down
5	Paul Braniff	Down	2-5	11	Meath
5	Sean Regan	Mayo	0-11	11	Kildare
5	Stephen Clynch	Meath	0-11	11	Kildare
8	Andy O'Brien	Wicklow	1-6	9	Kildare
8	Shane Nolan	Kerry	0-9	9	Down
8	Paul Divilly	Kildare	0-9	9	Meath
8	Shane Nolan	Kerry	0-9	9	Derry
8	Declan Coulter	Armagh	0-9	9	Down

== Miscellaneous ==
- Down won their 1st championship in 16 years, last winning the 1997 Ulster Senior Hurling Championship.
- Down are the second Ulster county to win the Christy Ring Cup, along with Antrim.

== See also ==
- 2013 All-Ireland Senior Hurling Championship
- 2013 Ulster Senior Hurling Championship
- 2013 Nicky Rackard Cup
- 2013 Lory Meagher Cup
