= 2012 Christy Ring Cup =

- Dates: 5 May – 9 June 2012
- Teams: 8
- Champions: London; Colm Quinn (captain); Éamonn Phelan (manager)
- Runners-up: Wicklow; Enan Glynn (captain); Casey O'Brien (manager)

Tournament statistics
- Matches played: 14
- Goals scored: 49 (3.5 per match)
- Points scored: 455 (32.5 per match)

The 2012 Christy Ring Cup was the eighth season of the Christy Ring Cup since its establishment in 2005.

== Team changes ==
=== To Championship ===
Relegated from the All-Ireland Senior Hurling Championship

- None

Promoted from the Nicky Rackard Cup

- London

=== From Championship ===
Promoted to the All-Ireland Senior Hurling Championship

- None

Relegated to the Nicky Rackard Cup

- Armagh

== Team info ==
A total of eight teams contested the Christy Ring Cup, including seven sides from the 2011 Christy Ring Cup and London, who were promoted as champions of the 2011 Nicky Rackard Cup. London again ended the season as champions, this time in the Christy Ring Cup, thus securing promotion to the top tier of hurling, the All-Ireland Championship, in 2013.

While both Armagh and Mayo had failed to win any of their (two) games in the 2011 Christy Ring Cup, Mayo retained their place in the 2012 edition with Armagh being relegated to the Nicky Rackard Cup for 2012 without a playoff game; Mayo had the longest tenure as a Christy Ring Cup member having competed in every season since the inaugural one in 2005 while Armagh had only joined the Christy Ring Cup in 2011, having won the previous year's Nicky Rackard Cup.

== Teams ==
=== General Information ===
County	Last Cup title	Last Provincial title	Last All-Ireland title	Position in 2011 Championship	Appearance
Derry	—	2001	—	Quarter-finals	7th
Down	—	1997	—	Semi-finals	8th
Kerry	2011	1891	1891	Champions	8th
Kildare	—	—	—	Semi-finals	8th
London	—	—	1901	Champions (Nicky Rackard Cup)	4th
Mayo	—	1909	—	Round 2	8th
Meath	—	—	—	Quarter-finals	7th
Wicklow	—	—	—	Runners-up	8th

=== Personnel and kits ===
County	Manager	Captain(s)	Sponsor

=== Stadia and locations ===
Team	Location	Stadium	Stadium capacity
Derry	Derry	Celtic Park (Derry)	5,000
Down	Newry	Páirc Esler	20,000
Kerry	Tralee	Austin Stack Park	18,000
Kildare	Newbridge	St. Conleth's Park	4,000
London	Ruislip	Emerald GAA Grounds	5,000
Mayo	Castlebar	McHale Park	49,000
Meath	Navan	Páirc Tailteann	10,000
Wicklow	Aughrim	Aughrim County Ground	10,000

== Format ==
The tournament has a double elimination format - each team will play at least two games before being knocked out.

- The eight teams play four Round 1 matches.
  - The winners in Round 1 advance to Round 2A.
  - The losers in Round 1 go into Round 2B.
- There are two Round 2A matches.
  - The winners in Round 2A advance to the semi-finals.
  - The losers in Round 2A go into the quarter-finals.
- There are two Round 2B matches.
  - The winners in Round 2B advance to the quarter-finals.
  - The losers in Round 2B are eliminated.
- There are two quarter-final matches between the Round 2A losers and Round 2B winners.
  - The winners of the quarter-finals advance to the semi-finals.
  - The losers of the quarter-finals are eliminated.
- There are two semi-final matches between the Round 2A winners and the quarter-final winners.
  - The winners of the semi-finals advance to the final.
  - The losers of the semi-finals are eliminated.
- The winners of the final win the Christy Ring Cup for 2012 and are promoted to the Liam MacCarthy Cup 2013.

== Round 1 ==
5 May 2012	Wicklow	2-20 - 2-15	Kerry	Aughrim County Ground, Aughrim
14:30	J O'Neill 0-11 (8f), A O'Brien 1-5, W O'Gorman 1-0, E Kearns 0-2, R Keddy, C Moorehouse 0-1 each.	Report	S Nolan 1-3, M Boyle 1-1, S Brick (3f), D O'Connell (1f) 0-4 each, W O'Dwyer 0-3.	Referee: D Hughes (Carlow)

5 May 2012	Mayo	0-17 - 0-19	Down	McHale Park, Castlebar
14:30	K Feeney 0-11 (10f), D McTighe 0-2, B Hunt, K Higgins, P Connell, C Freeman 0-1 each.	Report	P Braniff 0-8 (7f, 1 '65), P Sheehan 0-3, D Toner, A O'Prey, C Mageann 0-2 each, M Ennis, M Turley 0-1 each.	Referee: S Hourigan (Limerick)

5 May 2012	Derry	1-22 - 2-18	Kildare	Celtic Park, Derry
14:30	P Henry 0-12fs, O McCloskey 1-1, P Kelly 0-3 (2fs, 1 65), C Gilmore 0-2, K Hinphey, L Hinphey, A Grant, S McGuigan 0-1 each.	Report	P Divilly 2-5 (3fs), M Moloney 0-4, J Enright 0-3 (2fs), R Hoban (65), D Butler, G Tynan, T Murphy, D Harney, C Kenny 0-1 each.	Referee: G Duffy (Antrim)

6 May 2012	Meath	4-8 - 3-10	London	Páirc Tailteann, Navan
13:00	S Clynch 2-2, S Heavey 1-2, P Durnin 1-1, N Kirby 0-3.	Report	M Finn 1-2, J Maher, K Walsh 1-0 each, J Egan 0-3, M Walsh, C Quinn, E Cooney, P Sloane, H Vaughan 0-1 each.	Referee: P Murphy (Carlow)

== Round 2 ==
=== Round 2A ===
12 May 2012	Wicklow	1-18 - 2-11	Derry	Aughrim County Ground, Aughrim
	J O'Neill 0-8 (6f, 1 '65), J Connors 1-0, A O'Brien 0-3, C Moorehouse 0-2, T Doyle, E Kearns, G Bermingham, S Kelly, E Glynn 0-1 each.	Report	P Henry 0-9 (7f, 1 '65), P McCloskey, B Quigley 1-0 each, A Grant 0-2.

12 May 2012	Down	2-23 - 1-19	Meath	Páirc Esler, Newry
	P Braniff 1-8 (6f), A O'Prey, M Turley 0-3 each, C Mageean 1-0, P Sheehan, F Conway, C Bailie 0-2 each, D Hobbs, C Woods, A Savage 0-1 each.	Report	N Kirby 0-8 (6f), P Durnin 0-5, J Kelly 1-0, S Clynch 0-2, S Heavey, J Togher, S Donoghue, P Conneely 0-1 each.

=== Round 2B ===
12 May 2012	Kildare	2-21 - 1-16	Kerry	St. Conleth's Park, Newbridge
	M Moloney 2-3, M Fitzgerald 0-6, P Divilly 0-5 (3f), C Kenny 0-2, D Butler, T Murphy, G Keegan, D Harney, J Enright (f) 0-1 each.	Report	S Brick 1-8 (7f, 1-0 pen), W O'Dwyer 0-4, M Boyle 0-2 (1f), D Dineen, D O'Connell (f) 0-1 each.

12 May 2012	London	2-15 - 3-10	Mayo	Emerald GAA Grounds, Ruislip
	M Finn 1-9 (5f), J Maher 1-2, J Egan 0-2, S Ryan, H Vaughan 0-1 each.	Report	B Hunt 2-0, K Feeney 0-5 (5f), C Freeman 1-0 D McDonnell, K Higgins (1f) 0-2 each, D O'Brien 0-1.

== Quarter-finals ==
19 May 2012	Derry	1-15 - 3-11	London	Celtic Park, Derry
14:00	P Henry 1-6 (4fs, 1 65), P McCloskey, A Grant, S Farren 0-2 each, O McCloskey, S McGuigan, P Kelly 0-1 each.	Report	M Finn 1-4 (2fs, 1 65), L Hand 2-0, J Egan 0-4, P Sloane, J Maher, S Egan 0-1 each.	Referee: G Duffy (Antrim)

19 May 2012	Meath	1-16 - 0-16	Kildare	Páirc Tailteann, Navan
14:30	S Clynch (0-7, 5 frees), J Kelly (1-2), N Kirby (0-4, 4 frees), S Morris (0-1), J Toher (0-1), P Durnin (0-1).	Report	P Divilly (0-6, 5 frees), J Enright (0-3, 1 free), C Kenny (0-3), D Harney (0-2), M Moloney (0-2).	Referee: O Elliot (Antrim)

== Semi-finals ==
26 May 2012	Down	1-21 - 1-21 (aet)	London	Páirc Esler, Newry
	P Braniff 0-8 (7fs, 2 65s), M Turley 0-6 (2fs), C Woods 1-1, P Sheehan 0-4, D Hughes, A Savage 0-1 each.	Report	P Sloane 0-7 (6fs), M Finn 0-5fs, T Dunne 1-1, J Maher 0-3, PJ Roe, K Walsh 0-2 each, S Egan 0-1.	Referee: P Murphy (Carlow)

26 May 2012	Wicklow	3-17 - 2-12	Meath	Arklow
	A O’Brien 1-5, J O’Neill 0-9 (3fs, 1 65), C Moorehouse 1-1, W O’Gorman 1-0, Enan Glynn, T Doyle 0-1 each.	Report	S Clinch 1-4 (1f, 2 65s), D Doran 1-3, N Kirby 0-3 (2fs), P Durnin, N Horan 0-1 each.	Referee: T Carroll (Offaly)

2 June 2012 Replay	London	2-16 - 2-13 (aet)	Down	Emerald GAA Grounds, Ruislip
	M Finn 1-4 (4f), K Walsh 0-4, J Maher 0-3, L Hand 1-0, PJ Rowe 0-2, T Dunne, J Egan, T Hogan 0-1 each.	Report	C Woods 1-8 (1-0pen, 6f, 1 ‘65’), M Ennis 1-0, F Conway, E Clarke 0-2 each, P Sheehan 0-1 (1f).	Referee: T Carroll (Offaly)

== Final ==
9 June 2012	Wicklow	1-17 - 4-18	London	Croke Park, Dublin
	J O’Neill 0-11(6fs, 1 45); E Glynn 1-1; E Kearns, A O’Brien 0-2 each; W O’Gorman, E Dunne 0-1 each.	Report	J Maher 3-4; M Finn 1-5(fs); J Egan 0-4; C Quinn 0-2; P Sloane, K Walsh, T Dunne 0-1 each.

== Statistics ==
=== Top scorers ===
==== Overall ====
Rank	Player	County	Tally	Total	Matches	Average
1	Martin Finn	London	5-29	44	6	7.33
2	Jonathan O'Neill	Wicklow	0-39	39	4	9.75
3	Paddy Henry	Derry	1-27	30	3	10.00
4	Jonathan Maher	London	5-13	28	6	4.66
5	Paul Braniff	Down	1-24	27	3	9.00
6	Stephen Clynch	Meath	3-15	24	4	6.00
7	Paul Divilly	Kildare	2-16	22	3	7.33

==== Single game ====
Rank	Player	County	Tally	Total	Opposition
1	Jonathan Maher	London	3-4	13	Wicklow
2	Martin Finn	London	1-9	12	Mayo
2	Paddy Henry	Derry	0-12	12	Kildare
4	Paul Divilly	Kildare	2-5	11	Derry
4	Conor Woods	Down	1-8	11	London
4	Paul Braniff	Down	1-8	11	Meath
4	Shane Brick	Kerry	1-8	11	Kildare
4	Kenny Feeney	Mayo	0-11	11	Down
4	Jonathan O'Neill	Wicklow	0-11	11	Kerry
4	Jonathan O'Neill	Wicklow	0-11	11	London
