= All-Ireland Senior B Hurling Championship =

- Irish: Craobh Shinsir Iomána na hÉireann "B"
- Code: Hurling
- Founded: 1974
- Abolished: 2004
- Region: Ireland, Britain, North America (GAA)
- Trophy: All-Ireland Senior B Cup
- No. of teams: Variable, between 5 and 11 depending on year
- First winner: Kildare
- Most titles: London (5 titles)

The All-Ireland Senior B Hurling Championship was a hurling competition held annually between 1974 and 2004 and organised by the Gaelic Athletic Association (GAA). It was contested by those county teams which were knocked out in the first round of the All-Ireland Senior Hurling Championship, with the winner awarded the championship.

The series of games began every year immediately after the completion of the National Hurling League, with the All-Ireland final being played in June or July, initially in Croke Park, Dublin, but later in provincial venues around the country and in Britain. The championship was abolished in 2004, with the teams involved later playing in, first, the Christy Ring Cup, and since 2018, the Joe McDonagh Cup.

The title was won by 11 different teams, 6 of which won the title more than once. The all-time record-holder is London, which won the competition 5 times. The history of the championship was bookended by victories for Kildare, winner of the first title in 1974 and the last in 2004.

== History ==
=== Creation ===
Following ongoing one-sided matches in the All-Ireland Senior Hurling Championship between counties of differing standards, the Gaelic Athletic Association (GAA) began considering the addition of a tournament for those county teams that were eliminated in the early stages of their respective provincial championship. The GAA found broad support for the introduction of this additional championship and canvassed options for its potential structure and future inclusion within the annual calendar. The championship was branded the Senior B championship and its inaugural season was 1974.

Second and third-tier competitions have already been incorporated in hurling for several years, such as the Intermediate and Junior championships.

=== Development ===
The championship remained knockout but the number of participating teams increased.

=== Team changes ===
12 county teams have participated in at least one edition of the championship.

=== Championship moments ===
- New York 4-16 - 0-13 Derry (1996): New York became the first American side to win the championship.

== Format ==
The championship was open to all hurling teams who did not take part in the proper All-Ireland Senior Hurling Championship. It was a knock-out competition whereby once a team lost they were eliminated from the championship.

== Teams ==
=== 2004 Championship ===
The championship was suspended after the completion of the 2004 All-Ireland Senior B Hurling Championship. Three counties competed in 2004:

County	Location	Stadium	Province	Position in 2003Championship	Championship Titles	Last Championship Title
Kildare	Newbridge	St Conleth's Park	Leinster	—	4	2004
Mayo	Castlebar	MacHale Park	Connacht	—	0	—
Wicklow	Aughrim	Aughrim County Ground	Leinster	Champions	1	2003

=== List of All-Ireland Senior B Hurling Championship counties ===
Team	Total years	First year in championship	Most recent year in championship	Championship titles	Last championship title	Position in 2023 championship	Best Senior B finish	Current championship	Lvl
Antrim		1974							
Carlow		1974							
Down		1974							
Hertfordshire		1974							
Kerry		1974							
Kildare		1974							
Laois		1976							
London		1975							
Meath		1974							
Roscommon		1975							
Westmeath		1974							
Wicklow		1974							

=== Team appearances (1974-1977) ===
#	Team	No.	Years in championship
1	Antrim	4	1974, 1975, 1976, 1977
1	Carlow	4	1974, 1975, 1976, 1977
3	Kerry	3	1974, 1975, 1976
3	Down	3	1974, 1975, 1977
3	Meath	3	1974, 1975, 1977
3	Wicklow	3	1974, 1975, 1977
3	Roscommon	3	1975, 1976, 1977
3	London	3	1975, 1976, 1977
9	Westmeath	2	1974, 1975
9	Laois	2	1976, 1977
11	Hertfordshire	1	1974
11	Kildare	1	1974

== Qualification for subsequent competitions ==
=== Qualification for the All-Ireland Championship ===
The Senior B winners qualified back into the subsequent All-Ireland Senior Hurling Championship at the quarter-final stage. The Senior B champions played a provincial winner (or Galway) at this stage.

==== All-Ireland record of Senior B teams ====
Season	County	Round	Opponent	Score
1996	New York	Quarter-finals	Galway	4-22 - 0-08
2004	No All-Ireland path for Senior B champions			

== Roll of Honour ==
Performances in the All-Ireland Senior B Hurling Championship by county
County	Title(s)	Runners-up	Years won	Years runner-up
London	5	16	1985, 1987, 1988, 1990, 1995	1975, 1976, 1977, 1978, 1979, 1980, 1981, 1982, 1983, 1984, 1986, 1989, 1991, 1992, 1993, 1994
Kildare	4	1	1974, 1980, 1989, 2004	1990
Antrim	3	1	1978, 1981, 1982	1974
Kerry	3	0	1976, 1983, 1986	-
Westmeath	3	0	1975, 1984, 1991	-
Laois	3	0	1977, 1979, 2002	-
Wicklow	1	2	2003	1995, 2002
Carlow	1	1	1992	1987
Meath	1	1	1993	1985
Roscommon	1	1	1994	2003
New York	1	0	1996	-
Down	0	1	-	1988
Derry	0	1	-	1996
Mayo	0	1	-	2004

Performances in the All-Ireland Senior B Hurling Championship by province
Province	Title(s)	Runners-Up	Total				
Province	Title(s)	Runners-Up	Total	Leinster	13	5	18
Britain	5	16	21				
Ulster	3	3	6				
Munster	3	0	3				
Connacht	1	2	3				
North America	1	0	1				

== List of finals ==
Year	Date	Winners		Runners-up		Venue	Winning margin
Year	Date	County	Score	County	Score	Venue	Winning margin
2004	24 July	Kildare	3-14	Mayo	3-07	Croke Park	7
2003		Wicklow	4-16	Roscommon	2-13	Croke Park	9
2002		Laois	2-20	Wicklow	2-07	Semple Stadium	13
1997–2001	Not contested						
1996		New York	4-16	Derry	0-13		15
1995		London	2-07	Wicklow	0-08	O'Moore Park	5
1994		Roscommon	1-10	London	1-09	McGovern Park	1
1993		Meath	2-16	London	1-16		3
1992		Carlow	2-15	London	3-10		2
1991		Westmeath	2-12	London	2-06		6
1990		London	1-15	Kildare	5-02		1
1989		Kildare	2-06	London	1-07		2
1988		London	2-06	Down	1-07		2
1987		London	0-20	Carlow	1-15		2
1986		Kerry	3-10	London	1-09		7
1985		London	1-09	Meath	1-06		3
1984		Westmeath	4-10	London	1-16		3
1983		Kerry	2-08	London	1-07		4
1982		Antrim	2-16	London	2-14		2
1981		Antrim	3-17	London	3-14		3
1980		Kildare	2-20	London	2-14		6
1979		Laois	1-20	London	0-17		6
1978		Antrim	1-16	London	3-07		3
1977		Laois	3-21	London	2-09		15
1976		Kerry	0-15	London	1-10		2
1975	22 June	Westmeath	3-23	London	2-07	Croke Park	19
1974	23 June	Kildare	1-26	Antrim	3-13	Croke Park	7

== Team records and statistics ==
=== Team results ===
Legend

- 1st – Champions
- 2nd – Runners-up
- SF/QF/PR – Semi-finals/Quarter-finals/Preliminary round

For each year, the number of counties (in brackets) are shown.

Team	1974 (9)	1975 (9)	1976 (6)	1977 (8)	1978 (5)	1979 (8)	Total
Antrim	2nd	SF	HF	HF	1st	SF	6
Carlow	FR	QF	SF	FR	—	—	4
Down	FR	QF	—	SF	HF	—	4
Hertfordshire	SF	—	—	—	—	—	1
Kerry	FR	HF	1st	—	—	SF	4
Kildare	1st	—	—	—	—	HF	2
Laois	—	—	QF	1st	—	1st	3
London	—	2nd	2nd	2nd	2nd	2nd	5
Meath	QF	SF	—	FR	SF	—	4
Roscommon	—	QF	SF	FR	SF	QF	5
Westmeath	SF	1st	—	—	—	QF	3
Wicklow	FR	QF	—	SF	—	QF	4

=== Teams ===
County	Wins	Most recent win
Antrim	3	1982
Carlow	1	1992
Kerry	3	1986
Kildare	4	2004
Laois	3	2002
London	5	1995
Meath	1	1993
New York	1	1996
Roscommon	1	1994
Westmeath	3	1991
Wicklow	1	2003

=== Performances by province ===
Province	Title(s)	Runners-up	Last Title (Year)	Biggest Contributor (Titles
Leinster	13	5	Kildare (2004)	Kildare (4)
Britain	5	16	London (1995)	London (5)
Ulster	3	3	Antrim (1982)	Antrim (3)
Munster	3	0	Kerry (1986)	Kerry (3)
Connacht	1	2	Roscommon (1994)	Roscommon (1)
North America	1	0	New York (1996)	New York (1)

== See also ==
- All-Ireland Senior Hurling Championship
- All-Ireland Intermediate Hurling Championship
- All-Ireland Junior Hurling Championship
