= Kerry county hurling team =

Hurling team

Kerry
- Sport: Hurling
- Irish: Ciarraí
- Nickname(s): The Kingdom
- County board: Kerry GAA
- Manager: John Griffin
- Home venue(s): Austin Stack Park, Tralee

Recent competitive record
- Last championship title: 1891
- Current NHL Division: 2 (3rd in 2025)
- Last league title: None
First colours	Second colours

The Kerry county hurling team represents Kerry in hurling and is governed by Kerry GAA, the county board of the Gaelic Athletic Association. The team competes in the Christy Ring Cup and the National Hurling League.

Kerry's home ground is Austin Stack Park, Tralee. The team's manager is John Griffin.

The team last won the Munster Senior Championship in 1891, the All-Ireland Senior Championship in 1891 and has never won the National League.

== History ==
For many years the senior team played in the Junior and Intermediate Championships and had some success. They won All-Ireland titles at Junior level in 1961 and 1972, and won a Munster Championship at junior level in 1956. At Intermediate level they won Munster titles in 1970 and 1973.

Kerry have played in just one Munster Minor Hurling Championship Final, in 1938, when they lost to a Cork team that included the great Christy Ring. They have, however, won and played in a number of All-Ireland B Finals.

In 2003, team made it to the fourth round of the qualifiers only to go down to Limerick 1–14 to 0–24 in Austin Stack Park in Tralee. Along the way they beat Westmeath, Carlow and beaten Ulster finalists Derry. The wins over Westmeath and Carlow represented the first time a Kerry team strung two consecutive Championship victories together. It also marked the first occasion that the Kerry hurling team played more championship games then the Kerry football team.

Kerry have never won the Munster Under-21 Hurling Championship, their most notable achievement in the championship came in 2004 when they ran Limerick to three points at Austin Stack Park. They have, however, won and played in a number of All-Ireland U21 B Championship Finals.

The advent of the multi-tier structure saw Kerry become more competitive. They first made the semi-finals of the (then 2nd tier) Christy Ring Cup in 2009 where they lost out to Carlow after a replay. They went a step more in 2010 making the final but losing out to Westmeath. In 2011 they again made the final, but this time won the title with victory over Wicklow. From 2013 to 2015 they made the final each year, losing to Down in 2013 and Kildare in 2014 before finally getting over the line thanks to victory over Derry.

Kerry won the Division 2A final of the 2015 National Hurling League and advanced to the relegation/promotion match with favourites Antrim, a late point by substitute John Egan saw Kerry advance to Division 1B.

In 2016, Kerry played in the Leinster Senior Hurling Championship round robin along with Carlow, Westmeath and Offaly. During the 2018 Munster Senior Hurling League Kerry recorded their first ever senior victory over Cork beating them 1–23 to 1–13 at Austin Stack Park.

On 8 January 2022 Kerry recorded their first victory over Tipperary 0–17 to 0–14 in the Munster Hurling Cup quarter-final. At the time, it was deemed Kerry's greatest hurling success in Austin Stack Park since they beat All-Ireland champions Clare by 3–7 to 1–8 in the opening round of 1995–96 NHL.

John "Tweek" Griffin managed Kerry into championship hurling's third tier for the first time, leading his team to relegation from the 2025 Joe McDonagh Cup in May 2025. Having competed in the Joe McDonagh Cup since the competition's inception, relegation brought Kerry back to the (third tier) Christy Ring Cup, which the team had not competed in since it was a second tier competition.

== Panel ==
Team as per Kerry vs Meath in the Joe McDonagh Cup round 5, 25 May 2024

No.	Player	Position	Club
1	Louis Dee	Goalkeeper	Liam Mellows
2	Eric Leen	Right Corner Back	St Brendan's, Ardfert
3	Daithí Griffin	Full back	St Brendan's, Ardfert
4	Flor McCarthy	Left Corner Back	Kilmoyley
5	Bill Keane	Right half back	Crotta O'Neill's
6	Evan Murphy	Centre back	Causeway
7	Kyle O'Connor	Left half back	Ballyduff
8	Ronan Walsh	Midfield	Kilmoyley
9	Colin Walsh	Midfield	Ballyheigue
10	Gavin Dooley	Right half forward	Causeway
11	Dan Goggin	Centre forward	Causeway
12	Killian Hayes	Left half forward	Kilmallock
13	Brandon Barrett	Right corner forward	Causeway
14	Fionán Mackessy (c)	Full forward	St Brendan's, Ardfert
15	Michael Leane	Left corner forward	Ballyheigue

No.	Player	Position	Club
16	Diarmuid Quirke	Substitute	Dr Crokes
17	Dara Kearney	Substitute	Ballyheigue
18	Darragh Reen	Substitute	Tralee Parnells
19	Darragh Shanahan	Substitute	Lixnaw
20	David Woulfe	Substitute	Kilmallock
21	Feilim O'Sullivan	Substitute	Ballyheigue
22	Luke Crowley	Substitute	Rathmore
23	Niall Mulcahy	Substitute	Mungret
24	Rory O'Mahony	Substitute	Crotta O'Neill's
25	Tomás O'Connor	Substitute	Crotta O'Neill's
26	Tom Doyle	Substitute	Dr Crokes

^{INJ} Player has had an injury which has affected recent involvement with the county team.
^{RET} Player has since retired from the county team.
^{WD} Player has since withdrawn from the county team due to a non-injury issue.

== Management team ==
Appointed in August 2024:

- Manager: John Griffin
- Selectors: Aidan Healy, Seán Maunsell

== Managerial history ==
- Éamonn Kelly: 2013–15
- Ciarán Carey: 2015–16
- Fintan O'Connor: 2016–21
- Stephen Molumphy: 2021–24
- John Griffin: 2024–present

== Players ==
=== Notable players ===
- Michael "Boxer" Slattery
- Brendan O'Sullivan
- John Healy
- John Mahony
- Tom Collins
- Maurice Leahy
- Christy Walsh

=== Awards ===
- Champion 15:

2005: John Mike Dooley
2006: Aidan Healy
2007: Shane Brick
2008: John Griffin
2009: Tom Murnane, Shane Brick^{2nd}
2010: Tom Murnane^{2nd}, Mikey Boyle, Darragh O'Connell
2011: James Godley, Jason Casey, Shane Nolan, Darragh O'Connell^{2nd}
2012: Paud Costello
2013: Bernard Rochford, Darren Dineen, Shane Nolan^{2nd}
2014: Bryan Murphy, Daniel Collins, Pádraig Boyle
2015: Shane Nolan^{3rd}, John Egan, Patrick Kelly, Keith Carmody
2018: Seán Weir
2020: Tomás O'Connor, Jason Diggins, Shane Nolan^{4th}, Shane Conway, Daniel Collins^{2nd}
2021: Eric Leen, Fionán Mackessy, Shane Conway^{2nd}
2022: Eoin Ross, Fionán Mackessy^{2nd}, Mikey Boyle, Pádraig Boyle^{2nd}
2024: Fionán Mackessy^{3rd}

== Honours ==
=== National ===
- All-Ireland Senior Hurling Championship
  - (gold) Winners (1): 1891
- All-Ireland Senior B Hurling Championship
  - (gold) Winners (3): 1976, 1983, 1986
- Joe McDonagh Cup
  - (silver) Runners-up (3): 2020, 2021, 2022
- Christy Ring Cup
  - (gold) Winners (2): 2011, 2015
  - (silver) Runners-up (4): 2010, 2013, 2014, 2026
- All-Ireland Junior Hurling Championship
  - (gold) Winners (2): 1961, 1972
  - (silver) Runners-up (2): 1968, 1969
- National Hurling League Division 2
  - (gold) Winners (7): 1956–57, 1961–62, 1966–67, 1967–68, 1978–79, 1998, 2001
  - (silver) Runners-up (10): 1955–56, 1964–65, 1965–66, 1974–75, 1976–77, 1977–78, 1992–93, 2003, 2006, 2026
- National Hurling League Division 2A
  - (gold) Winners (2): 2014, 2015
  - (silver) Runners-up (2): 2019, 2020
- National Hurling League Division 3
  - (gold) Winners (1): 1989–90
- National Hurling League Division 3A
  - (gold) Winners (1): 2010
- All-Ireland Under-21 B Hurling Championship
  - (gold) Winners (10): 1998, 2001, 2002, 2006, 2009, 2010, 2011, 2013, 2017, 2018
- All Ireland Minor B Hurling Championship
  - (gold) Winners (10): 1997, 2000, 2001, 2006, 2009, 2012, 2013, 2014, 2015, 2016

=== Provincial ===
- Munster Senior Hurling Championship
  - (gold) Winners (1): 1891
  - (silver) Runners-up (5): 1889, 1890, 1892, 1900, 1908
- Munster Intermediate Hurling Championship
  - (gold) Winners (2): 1970, 1973
  - (silver) Runners-up (1): 1972
- Munster Junior Hurling Championship
  - (gold) Winners (1): 1956
  - (silver) Runners-up (2): 1959, 1960
- Munster Minor Hurling Championship
  - (silver) Runners-up (1): 1938
- Leinster Minor B Hurling Championship
  - (gold) Winners (2): 1987, 1988
