= Niall Patterson =

Irish hurler

Personal information
- Native name: Niall Mac Pháidín (Irish)
- Nickname: Big Neilly
- Born: 2 January 1962 (age 64) Cloughmills, County Antrim, Northern Ireland
- Occupation: Musician
- Height: 5 ft 11 in (180 cm)

Sport
- Sport: Hurling
- Position: Goalkeeper
Club
- Years: Club
- Loughgiel Shamrocks
Club titles
- Antrim titles: 2
- Ulster titles: 1
- All-Ireland Titles: 1
Inter-county
| Years | County | Apps (scores) |
| 1979-1992 | Antrim | 18 (0-00) |
Inter-county titles
- Ulster titles: 3
- All-Irelands: 0
- NHL: 0
- All Stars: 0

Niall Patterson (born 2 January 1962) is a former hurler who played as a goalkeeper for the Antrim senior team.

Patterson made his first appearance for the team during the 1979 "B" championship and was a regular member of the starting fifteen for over a decade. During that time he won two All-Ireland "B" medals and three Ulster medals. He was also part of the team who reached 1989 All Ireland final against Tipperary.

At club level Patterson is an All-Ireland club medalist with Loughgiel Shamrocks. In addition to this he has also won one Ulster club medal and two county club championship medals.

== Honours ==
Loughgiel Shamrocks

- All-Ireland Senior Club Hurling Championship (1): 1983 (c)
- Ulster Senior Club Hurling Championship (2): 1982 (c), 1989
- Antrim Senior Club Hurling Championship (2): 1982 (c), 1989

Antrim

- All-Ireland Senior B Hurling Championship (2): 1981, 1982
- Ulster Senior Hurling Championship (3): 1989, 1990, 1991
- Ulster Under-21 Hurling Championship (4): 1979, 1980, 1981, 1982

Achievements
| Preceded by Jimmy O'Brien (James Stephens) | All-Ireland Senior Club Hurling Final winning captain 1983 | Succeeded by Kevin Fennelly (Ballyhale Shamrocks) |
