= 1995 All-Ireland Senior B Hurling Championship =

- Dates: 7 May - 6 July 1995
- Teams: 6
- Champions: London (5th title); Dan McKenna (captain)
- Runners-up: Wicklow; Tom Byrne (captain); Jack Murray (manager)

Tournament statistics
- Matches played: 6
- Goals scored: 22 (3.67 per match)
- Points scored: 123 (20.5 per match)
- Top scorer(s): John Keogh (1-18)

The 1995 All-Ireland Senior B Hurling Championship was the 22nd staging of the All-Ireland Senior B Hurling Championship since its establishment by the Gaelic Athletic Association in 1974. The championship ran from 7 May to 6 July 1995.

Roscommon were the defending champions, however, they availed of their right to promotion to the Connacht Senior Hurling Championship and did not field a team.

The All-Ireland final was played at O'Moore Park in Portlaoise on 2 July 1995 between London and Wicklow, in what was their first ever meeting in the All-Ireland final. London won the match by 2-07 to 0-08 to claim a record fifth All-Ireland title overall and a first title in five years.

Wicklow's John Keogh was the championship's top scorer with 1-18.

== Results ==
=== All-Ireland quarter-finals ===
7 May 1995 Quarter-final	Louth	0-08 - 6-16	Wicklow	Drogheda Park
	M Gormley 0-3, D Dunne 0-2, J Murphy 0-2, E Downey 0-1.		P Devlin 4-1, S Byrne 1-2, J Keogh 0-5, T Collins 1-1, D Hyland 0-4, C Byrne 0-1, C O'Toole 0-1, S O'Loughlin 0-1.

14 May 1995 Quarter-final	Fermanagh	3-11 - 3-08	Mayo	Brewster Park
	O McShea 2-6, S O'Donnell 1-3, C Dunne 0-1, S Duffy 0-1.		Declan Greally 2-1, Dom Greally 1-1, J Cunnane 0-4, V O'Hora 0-1, S Granahan 0-1.	Referee: O O'Neill (Meath)

=== All-Ireland semi-finals ===
21 May 1995 Semi-final	Wicklow	2-16 - 1-06	Fermanagh	St Brigid's Park
	D Hyland 0-6, S Byrne 1-2, J Keogh 0-5, S O'Loughlin 1-0, T Collins 0-1, N Cremin 0-1, C Byrne 0-1.		A McPhillips 1-0, S O'Donnell 0-2, O McShea 0-2, S Duffy 0-1, S Breslin 0-1.

21 May 1995 Semi-final	Kildare	0-14 - 1-09	Derry	St Brigid's Park
	C Byrne 0-6, M Moloney 0-2, J Byrne 0-2, E Kelly 0-1, R Coyle 0-1, G Deering 0-1, D Bowden 0-1.		O Collins 1-7, C McGurk 0-1, M McKenna 0-1.

=== All-Ireland home final ===
3 June 1995 Home final	Wicklow	3-12 - 1-08	Kildare	Nowlan Park
	J Keogh 1-4, S Byrne 1-1, T Collins 0-4, N Cremin 1-0, D Hyland 0-2, C Byrne 0-1.		G Deering 0-5, B Coulston 1-0, C Byrne 0-3.	Referee: J McDonnell (Tipperary)

=== All-Ireland final ===
2 July 1995 Final	London	2-07 - 0-08	Wicklow	O'Moore Park
	T Galway 0-5, F Moran 1-0, D Murphy 1-0, M Cunningham 0-2.		J Keogh 0-4, D Hyland 0-3, N Cremin 0-1.	Referee: A Mac Suibhne (Dublin)

== Championship statistics ==
=== Top scorers ===
Overall

Rank	Player	County	Tally	Total	Matches	Average
1	John Keogh	Wicklow	1-18	21	4	5.25
2	Don Hyland	Wicklow	0-15	15	4	3.75
3	Seán Byrne	Wicklow	3-05	14	3	4.66
4	Ollie McShea	Fermanagh	2-08	14	2	7.00
5	Paddy Devlin	Wicklow	4-01	13	4	3.25
