= 1990 All-Ireland Senior B Hurling Championship =

- Dates: 27 May – 8 July 1990
- Teams: 9
- Champions: London (3rd title)
- Runners-up: Kildare; Niall Daly (captain)

Tournament statistics
- Matches played: 10
- Goals scored: 42 (4.2 per match)
- Points scored: 235 (23.5 per match)
- Top scorer(s): Mick Moore (8-05)

The 1990 All-Ireland Senior B Hurling Championship was the 17th staging of the All-Ireland Senior B Hurling Championship since its establishment by the Gaelic Athletic Association in 1974. The championship ran from 27 May to 8 July 1990.

Kildare entered the championship as the defending champions.

The All-Ireland final was played at Emerald GAA Grounds in Ruislip on 8 July 1990 between London and Kildare, in what was their third meeting in the All-Ireland final and a second meeting in succession. London won the match by 1-15 to 5-02 to claim their third All-Ireland title overall and a first title in two years.

Kildare's Mick Moore was the championship's top scorer with 8-05.

== Results ==
=== All-Ireland quarter-finals ===
27 May 1990 Quarter-final	Carlow	1-16 - 1-14	Mayo	Dr Cullen Park
	J McDonald 0-7, P Murphy 1-3, J English 0-3, D Murphy 0-1, M Corburn 0-1, L Ahern 0-1.		J Henry 0-8, J Cunnane 1-1, M Trench 0-2, D Greally 0-2, V Henry 0-1.

27 May 1990 Quarter-final	Westmeath	3-09 - 4-16	Kildare	Cusack Park
	D Kilcoyne 1-5, P Clancy 1-0, S McLoughlin 1-0, E Dolan 0-2, M Kennedy 0-1, P Callery 0-1.		M Moore 3-2, G Ennis 1-5, J Phelan 0-3, G Quinn 0-3, T Carew 0-2, K Flynn 0-1.

27 May 1990 Quarter-final	Wicklow	1-09 - 2-06	Armagh	Pearse Park
	N Byrne 0-4, P Lee 1-0, C O'Brien 0-2, N Cremin 0-1, P Doyle 0-1, T Munroe 0-1.		P Devlin 1-3, J McCormack 1-1,

27 May 1990 Quarter-final	Roscommon	3-15 - 3-15	Meath	Athleague Grounds
	S Kilroy 2-7, S Mitchell 1-0, F Carty 0-2, P Lyons 0-2, D Coyle 0-2, P Dolan 0-1, P Dooley 0-1.		E McCaffrey 0-9, P Kelly 1-2, D Murray 1-1, M Smith 1-0, K Murray 0-2, W Donnelly 0-1.

2 June 1990 Quarter-final replay	Armagh	2-16 - 1-14 (aet)	Wicklow	Keady Grounds
	K Nugent 1-3, M Lennon 1-1, T Lennon 0-3, PJ O'Hare 0-3, P Doyle 0-2, E Craven 0-2, M Lennon 0-1, C Casey 0-1.

4 June 1990 Quarter-final replay	Meath	2-11 - 1-08	Roscommon	St Loman's Park
	A Kirby 2-1, E McCaffrey 0-6, M Massey 0-1, K Murray 0-1, M Smith 0-1, J Ennis 0-1.		S Kilroy 1-4, F Carty 0-1, R Dooley 0-1, P Dolan 0-1, S Mitchell 0-1.

=== All-Ireland semi-finals ===
9 June 1990 Semi-final	Meath	4-18 - 0-06	Armagh	Páirc na nGael
	K Murray 1-3, P Kelly 1-2, J Ennis 1-2, E McCaffrey 0-5, T Duignan 0-4, W Donnelly 1-0, M Massey 0-2.		PJ O'Hare 0-3, S Strain 0-1, J Devlin 0-1, T McAnallen 0-1.

9 June 1990 Semi-final	Kildare	2-13 - 1-14	Carlow	Nowlan Park
	G Deering 0-6, G Power 1-1, M Moore 1-1, G Ennis 0-2, T Carew 0-1, M Boren 0-1.

=== All-Ireland home final ===
23 June 1990 Home final	Kildare	3-09 - 2-09	Meath	Cusack Park
	T Carew 2-1, G Power 0-7, M Moore 1-1.		T Duignan 1-3, P Kelly 1-2, M Mossey 0-2, A Kirby 0-1, J Gorry 0-1.	Referee: P Horan (Offaly)

=== All-Ireland final ===
8 July 1990 Final	London	1-15 - 5-02	Kildare	Emerald GAA Grounds
	M Connolly 1-8, J Murphy 0-2, D McKenna 0-1, A Moylan 0-1, J Quinn 0-1, P Hoctor 0-1, J O'Donoghue 0-1.		M Moore 3-1, G Power 1-1, T Carew 1-0.	Referee: J Moore (Waterford)

== Championship statistics ==
=== Top scorers ===
Overall

Rank	Player	County	Tally	Total	Matches	Average
1	Mick Moore	Kildare	8-05	29	4	7.25
2	Séamus Kilroy	Kildare	3-11	20	2	10.00
3	Eunan McCaffrey	Meath	0-20	20	4	5.00
4	Paddy Kelly	Meath	3-06	15	4	3.75
4	Gerry Power	Kildare	2-09	15	4	3.75
