= Darren Rooney =

Irish hurler and Gaelic footballer

Personal information
- Native name: Darren Ó Ruanaidh (Irish)
- Born: Portlaoise, Ireland
- Height: 1.88 m (6 ft 2 in)

Sport
- Football Position: Right half back
- Hurling Position: Centre back
Clubs
- Years: Club
- Clonaslee–St Manman's; Parnells
Inter-county
- Years: County
- 2005- 2008-2012: Laois hurlers Laois footballers
Inter-county titles
	Football	Hurling
Leinster Titles	1	
League titles		2

Darren Rooney is an Irish Gaelic footballer and hurler from County Laois. His dual status makes him most unusual in the modern GAA.

He currently plays for the Parnells club in Dublin. He usually plays at right half back or full back art senior level for the Laois county team and in 2003 was part of the Laois team that won the Leinster Senior Football Championship title for the first time since 1946. Rooney was a member of the Laois minor team that retained the All-Ireland Minor Football Championship in 1997.

== Honours ==
- Leinster Senior Football Championship (1): 2003
- National Hurling League Division 2 (2): 2002, 2007
- All-Ireland Senior B Hurling Championship (1): 2002
- Leinster Minor Football Championship (1): 1997
- All-Ireland Minor Football Championship (1): 1997
