= 2002 All-Ireland Senior B Hurling Championship =

Football tournament season

- Dates: 29 June – 27 July 2002
- Teams: 8
- Champions: Laois (3rd title); John Lyons (captain); Séamus Plunkett (manager)
- Runners-up: Wicklow

Tournament statistics
- Matches played: 6
- Goals scored: 21 (3.5 per match)
- Points scored: 156 (26 per match)
- Top scorer(s): David Cuddy (4-18)

The 2002 All-Ireland Senior B Hurling Championship was the 24th staging of the All-Ireland Senior B Hurling Championship since its establishment by the Gaelic Athletic Association in 1974. The championship ran from 29 June to 27 July 2002.

Derry were the defending champions, however, they exited the championship after failing to field a team in their quarter-final game against Kerry.

The All-Ireland final was played at Semple Stadium in Thurles on 27 July 2002 between Laois and Wicklow, in what was their first ever meeting in the All-Ireland final. Laois won the match by 2-20 to 2-07 to claim their third All-Ireland title overall and a first title in 23 years.

Laois's David Cuddy was the championship's top scorer with 4-18.

== Results ==
=== All-Ireland quarter-finals ===
29 June 2002 Quarter-final	Kerry	w/o - scr.	Derry

29 June 2002 Quarter-final	Roscommon	3-07 - 2-19	Westmeath	Duggan Park
	D Mulvey 1-3, D Lohan 1-1, T Lennon 1-0, M Cunniffe 0-2, M Connaughton 0-1.		A Mitchell 1-4, J Shaw 0-7, D Carty 1-0, R Whelan 0-3, V Bateman 0-1, D McCormack 0-1, P Clarke 0-1, B Kennedy 0-1, S Morley 0-1.

30 June 2002 Quarter-final	Carlow	1-05 - 1-09	Wicklow	O'Moore Park
	R Foley 1-2, B Lawler 0-3.		D Hyland 1-4, L Glynn 0-1, J O'Neill 0-1, D Curran 0-1, J Murphy 0-1, W O'Gorman 0-1.

3 July 2002 Quarter-final	Laois	2-21 - 1-11	Carlow	Dr Cullen Park
	D Cuddy 2-6, PJ Peacock 0-4, J Young 0-4, O Dowling 0-3, T Fitzgerald 0-2, J Phelan 0-1, C Coonan 0-1.		D Ryan 0-4, D Nolan 0-4, S Gleeson 1-0, A McAndrew 0-1, C Buggy 0-1, C Boran 0-1.

=== All-Ireland semi-finals ===
13 July 2002 Semi-final	Laois	3-14 - 0-19	Westmeath	O'Moore Park
	D Cuddy 2-3, J Young 0-5, F O'Sullivan 1-1, O Dowling 0-2, C Cuddy 0-1, PJ Peacock 0-1, C Coonan 0-1.		J Shaw 0-8, A Mitchell 0-3, D McCormack 0-3, R Whelan 0-2, O Devine 0-1, P Clarke 0-1, J Gavigan 0-1.

13 July 2002 Semi-final	Wicklow	2-13 - 2-10	Kerry	O'Moore Park
	D Hyland 0-9, J O'Neill 1-1, W O'Gorman 1-1, J Murphy 0-1, L Glynn 0-1.		J Healy 1-1, M Slattery 0-4, S Brick 1-0, M Conway 0-2, B Brick 0-1, M O'Regan 0-1, D Young 0-1.

=== All-Ireland final ===
27 July 2002 Final	Laois	2-21 - 2-07	Wicklow	Semple Stadium
	D Cuddy 0-9, J Young 0-5, T Fitzgerald 1-0, O Dowling 1-0, F O'Sullivan 0-3, D Rooney 0-2, PJ Peacock 0-2.		D Hyland 1-5, W O'Gorman 1-0, J O'Neill 0-1, M O'Brien 0-1.	Referee: G Devlin (Armagh)

== Championship statistics ==
=== Top scorers ===
Rank	Player	Team	Tally	Total	Matches	Average
1	David Cuddy	Laois	4-18	30	3	10.00
2	Don Hyland	Wicklow	2-18	24	3	8.00
3	John Shaw	Westmeath	0-15	15	2	7.50
4	James Young	Laois	0-14	14	2	7.00
5	Andrew Mitchell	Westmeath	1-07	10	2	5.00
