= Ollie Walsh =

Irish hurler

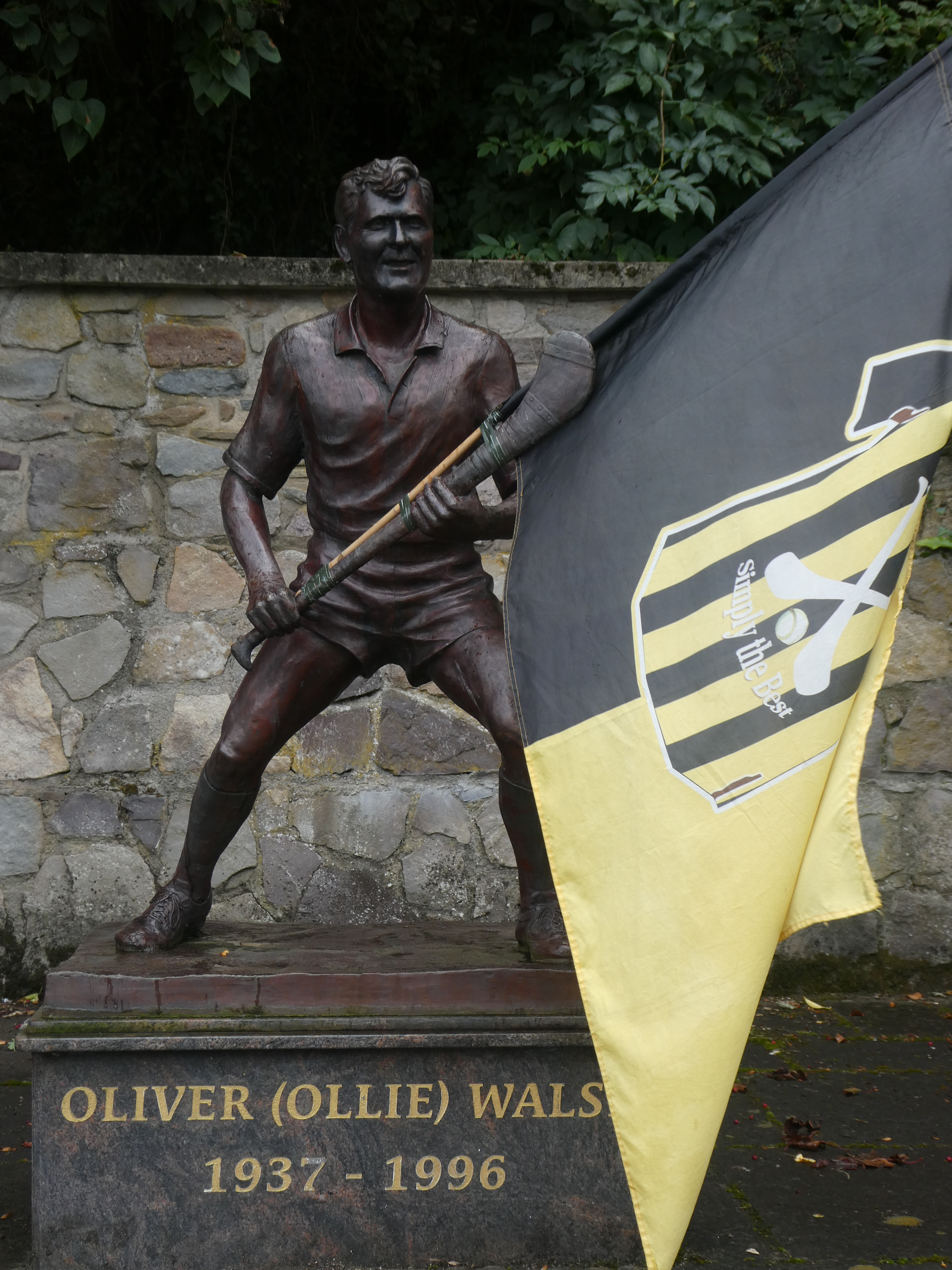
- Statue in Thomastown

Personal information
- Native name: Oilibhéar Breathnach (Irish)
- Nickname: Ollie
- Born: Patrick Oliver Walsh; 13 July 1937 Thomastown, County Kilkenny, Ireland
- Died: 9 March 1996 (aged 58) St. Luke's Hospital, Kilkenny, Ireland
- Occupation: Sales manager
- Height: 5 ft 11 in (180 cm)

Sport
- Sport: Hurling
- Position: Goalkeeper
Club
- Years: Club
- Thomastown
Club titles
	Football	Hurling
Kilkenny titles	1	0
Inter-county*
Years	County	Apps (scores)
1956–1972	Kilkenny	42 (0-00)
Inter-county titles
- Leinster titles: 10
- All-Irelands: 5
- NHL: 2
- All Stars: 3
- *Inter County team apps and scores correct as of 18:06, 5 May 2020.

Patrick Oliver Walsh (13 July 1937 – 9 March 1996) was an Irish hurler and hurling manager. His career included All-Ireland Championship victories as a player and later as a manager with the Kilkenny senior hurling team.

After beginning his career at club level with Thomastown, Walsh joined the Kilkenny minor team as a 15-year-old in 1953 and won a Leinster Minor Championship in 1955. After a brief stint with the junior side, he was promoted to the Kilkenny senior team in 1956. From his debut, Walsh was ever-present as a goalkeeper and made a total of 42 championship appearances in a career that ended with his last game in 1972. During that time he was part of five All-Ireland Championship-winning teams – in 1957, 1963, 1967, 1969 and 1972. Walsh also secured 10 Leinster Championship medals and two National Hurling League medals.

After his playing career, Walsh found success as both a club and inter-county manager. After gaining managerial experience with the Carlow senior hurling team, he guided his own Thomastown club to a Kilkenny Intermediate Championship title in 1983. After a hugely successful tenure with the Kilkenny junior team, Walsh managed the senior team to several All-Ireland Championship, Leinster Championship and National League successes over a five-year period.

Noted for his swashbuckling style, which included blocking, side-stepping his opponents and clearing the sliotar down the field, Walsh is regarded as one of the greatest goalkeepers in the history of the game. He was named Texaco Hurler of the Year in 1967, and was also selected on the Gaelic Weekly Team of the Year on three occasions.

== Playing career ==
=== Thomastown ===
Walsh began his hurling career at club level with Thomastown. After coming to prominence at schoolboy level, he enjoyed a hugely successful juvenile and underage career, winning a total of seven county championship medals in various grades between 1947 and 1954. The high point of Walsh's club career occurred on 16 December 1962 when he claimed a Kilkenny Junior Championship title after a 7–09 to 4–04 defeat of Coon in the final.

=== Graiguenamanagh ===
As a Gaelic footballer with Graiguenamanagh, Walsh was at left corner-back when the club faced Glenmore in the final of the 1956 Kilkenny Senior Championship. After an initial draw, he claimed a winners' medal after the 1–03 to 1–01 victory in the delayed replay.

=== Kilkenny ===
==== Minor and junior ====
Walsh first played for Kilkenny as a 15-year-old when he was drafted onto the minor team for the 1953 Leinster Championship. He made his debut on 21 June 1953 when Kilkenny suffered a 3–06 to 4–01 defeat by Dublin. In spite of the defeat, Walsh's "great display" was highlighted in a match report in the Irish Independent. Kilkenny and Dublin renewed their rivalry at minor level when the sides once again clashed in the 1954 Leinster final, however, Walsh ended the game on the losing side after lining out at midfield in the 4–12 to 4–07 defeat.

Walsh was eligible for the minor grade for a third successive season and, for the second successive season, he lined out in the decider when Kilkenny qualified to play Wexford in the 1955 Leinster final. He was again denied a provincial final victory when the game ended in a 3–10 to 5–04 draw. The replay a week later saw Walsh finally claim a Leinster Minor Championship medal after the 0–11 to 0–08 victory. His underage career ended on 7 August 1955 with a 3–13 to 1–08 defeat by Tipperary in the All-Ireland semi-final.

After being overage for the minor team the following year, Walsh was drafted on the Kilkenny junior team. He made his debut in that grade on 8 April 1956 when he lined out in goal in a 3–06 to 2–02 defeat of Wexford in the Leinster Junior Championship.

==== Senior ====
Walsh's performances in the minor and junior grades drew the attention of the senior selectors and he was one of a number of players promoted to the Kilkenny senior team prior to the start of the 1956 Leinster Championship. He made his first appearance in the senior ranks as an 18-year-old on 20 May 1956 in a 6–11 to 3–09 defeat of Westmeath. On 8 July 1956, Walsh lined out in his first Leinster final, however, Kilkenny suffered a 4–08 to 3–10 defeat by Wexford.

On 12 May 1957, Walsh contested his first national final when Kilkenny faced Tipperary in the final of the 1956-57 National League. He ended the game on the losing side after a 3–11 to 2–07 defeat. Walsh lined out in a second successive Leinster final on 4 August 1957 and claimed his first winners' medal after the 6–09 to 1–05 defeat of Wexford. On 1 September 1957, he again lined out in goal when Kilkenny faced Waterford in the All-Ireland final. Walsh ended the game with his first winners' medal after the 4–10 to 3–12 victory.

Walsh lined out in a second successive provincial decider when Kilkenny qualified to play Wexford in the 1958 Leinster final. He ended the game with a second successive winners' medal after being described in the Irish Independent as an "inspiration" following the 5–12 to 4–09 victory.

On 12 July 1959, Walsh lined out in the fourth Leinster final of his career with Dublin providing the opposition. He was at fault for conceding a goal after bringing down a high ball, however, he ended the game with a third successive winners' medal after the 2–09 to 1–11 victory. On 6 September 1959, Walsh played in his second All-Ireland final when Kilkenny faced Waterford at Croke Park. He gave a commanding display in goal, in spite of conceding five goals, in the 1–17 to 5–05 draw. The replay on 4 October 1959 saw Walsh bring off a number of important saves, however, he ended the game on the losing side after the 3–12 to 1–10 defeat.

After failing to make it four successive provincial titles in-a-row after losing out to Wexford in the 1960 Leinster final, Kilkenny failed to even qualify for the following year's final. On 6 May 1962, Walsh claimed his second national title when Kilkenny defeated Cork by 1–16 to 1–08 to claim the National League title for the first time in 30 years. He was subsequently denied a fourth Leinster Championship medal as Kilkenny suffered a 3–09 to 2–10 defeat by Wexford in the 1962 Leinster final.

Walsh claimed his fourth provincial winners' medal after making his seventh final appearance in the 2–10 to 0–09 defeat of Dublin in the 1963 Leinster final. On 1 September 1963, he lined out in goal for the fourth time in seven seasons against Waterford in an All-Ireland final. Walsh conceded six goals over the course of the game, however, he "brought off many fantastic saves, four of them in quick succession in the opening minutes and the last, and certainly the most valuable, when he stopped a downward drive from Power, when Waterford were only two points in arrears, with only four minutes of the hour remaining." Having collected his second All-Ireland winners' medal after the 4–17 to 6–08 victory, he ended the season by being named in the goalkeeping position on the 1963 Gaelic Weekly Team of the Year.

After collecting a fifth provincial title after the 4–11 to 1–08 defeat of Dublin in the 1964 Leinster final, Walsh lined out in a second consecutive All-Ireland final on 6 September 1964. In spite of being regarded as the favourites, Kilkenny ended the game as runners-up after a 5–13 to 2–08 defeat by Tipperary. Walsh ended the season by being named on the Gaelic Weekly Team of the Year for a second successive occasion.

On 23 May 1965, Walsh was in goal when Kilkenny suffered a 3–14 to 2–08 defeat by Tipperary in the home final of the 1964-65 National League. Kilkenny subsequently failed in their bid to secure the Leinster Championship for a third successive year, with Walsh incurring his fourth provincial decider loss after a 2–11 to 3–07 defeat by Wexford in the 1965 Leinster final.

Walsh claimed the sixth provincial winners' medal after a 1–15 to 2–06 defeat of Wexford in the 1966 Leinster final. On 4 September 1966, he conceded a hat-trick of goals by Colm Sheehan when Kilkenny suffered a 3–09 to 1–10 defeat by Cork in the All-Ireland final. In spite of this defeat, Walsh ended the season with a second National League winners' medal after an aggregate victory of 10–15 to 2–15 over New York in the final.

After failing to retain the National League title following a 3–10 to 1–09 defeat by Wexford in the 1966-67 final, Kilkenny later turned the tables on Wexford with Walsh claiming his seventh Leinster Championship winners' medal after a 4–10 to 1–12 victory in the 1967 Leinster final. On 3 September 1967, he claimed his third All-Ireland winners' medal after a 3–08 to 2–07 victory and a first All-Ireland final win over Tipperary in 45 years. Walsh ended the season by becoming the first of only three goalkeepers to be named Texaco Hurler of the Year.

On 12 May 1968, Walsh was in goal when Kilkenny were beaten 3–09 to 1–13 by Tipperary in the final of the 1967-68 National League. The ill-tempered game saw Walsh being struck by John Flanagan. He was subsequently found “guilty of jabbing with the hurley” and suspended for six months, with some theorising that the GAA were out to punish him after he had expressed his opposition to the Ban during the course of an appearance on The Late Late Show. Tipperary player Babs Keating believes that Walsh was a scapegoat, stating: "I felt sorry for him. No one has any quibble if justice is done but in that ease, justice wasn't done." The suspension ruled him out of the 1968 Leinster Championship, with the Kilkenny County Board considering whether to withdraw from the competition. Such was the esteem that Walsh was held in, the 1968 Kilkenny Hurling Championship was delayed on purpose while he served his suspension.

Reinstated as first-choice goalkeeper in advance of the 1969 Leinster Championship, Walsh claimed his eighth provincial winners' medal after a 3–09 to 0–16 defeat of Offaly in the final. On 7 September 1969, he made his eighth All-Ireland final appearance - his second against Cork in the space of four seasons - and claimed his fourth All-Ireland winners' medal after the 2–15 to 2–09 victory.

After surrendering the provincial title to Wexford in the 1970 Leinster final, Walsh claimed a ninth Leinster Championship the following year after a 6–16 to 3–16 defeat of the reigning champions. On 5 September 1971, he made his ninth appearance in an All-Ireland final when Kilkenny suffered a 5–17 to 5–14 defeat by Tipperary.

Walsh was replaced as goalkeeper by his cousin, Noel Skehan, for the 1972 Leinster Championship, however, he remained as stand-by goalkeeper and claimed his 10th Leinster Championship medal from the substitutes bench after a 3–16 to 1–14 defeat of Wexford. On 3 September 1972, he claimed his fifth All-Ireland winners' medal from the substitutes' bench after a 3–24 to 5–11 defeat of Cork in the final.

=== Leinster ===
Walsh's performances for Kilkenny during the 1957 All-Ireland Championship led to his inclusion as first-choice goalkeeper in the Leinster team for the 1958 Railway Cup. Munster dominated the competition at the time, with Walsh losing three finals in his first four seasons with the team. He claimed his first winners' medal on 17 March 1962 when he lined out in goal in Leinster's 1–11 to 1–09 defeat of Munster in the final.

After surrendering the title to Munster the following year, Walsh won back-to-back medals in 1964 and 1965 after back-to-back defeats of Munster. Three in-a-row proved beyond Leinster, however, he claimed his fourth winners' medal as captain of the side in 1967 after a 2–14 to 3–05 victory over Munster once again. Walsh remained as first-choice goalkeeper until his last appearance in the 1970 Railway Cup final defeat by Munster.

== Managerial career ==
Ollie Walsh
Sport
Inter-county management
- Years: Team
- 1980-1982 1990–1995: Carlow; Kilkenny
Inter-county titles as manager
County	League	Province	All-Ireland
Kilkenny	2	3	3

=== Early career ===
Walsh began his coaching career at club when he took charge of the Dicksboro minor and senior teams in the late 1970s. His first taste of inter-county management came in 1979 when he was appointed as a selector to the Kilkenny minor team. He helped guide the team, which featured his son Michael in goal, to the Leinster Championship title, however, the side suffered defeat by Cork in the All-Ireland final.

In March 1980, Walsh was appointed coach of the Carlow senior hurling team. After incurring a 5–21 to 3-16 All-Ireland home final defeat by Kildare in the 1980 All-Ireland B Championship, he guided the team to promotion to Division 1 of the National Hurling League the following year. After a second All-Ireland home final defeat in three seasons, this time by Antrim, Walsh stepped down as coach immediately after the game.

Walsh returned to club management when he took charge of his native Thomastown club in 1983. He ended the year by guiding the club to the Kilkenny Intermediate Championship title after a defeat of O'Loughlin Gaels, two decades after he had helped the club gain promotion to the intermediate grade as a player. Walsh returned to inter-county management the following year when he was appointed manager of the Kilkenny junior team. The team went on to dominate during this era, winning five Leinster Junior Championships over the course of seven seasons, which were converted to All-Ireland Junior Championship wins in 1984, 1986, 1988 and 1990.

=== Kilkenny manager ===
After a decade of involvement with the Kilkenny minor, under-21 and junior teams at various times, Walsh was appointed manager of the Kilkenny senior hurling team in a caretaker capacity on 19 October 1990. His first game in charge a week later saw Kilkenny secure a home victory over Dublin in the first round of the 1990-91 National League. After securing the Leinster Championship with a late goal against Dublin in the final, Walsh guided the team to a first All-Ireland final appearance in four years and a first meeting with Tipperary in 20 years. A mishit Michael Cleary shot produced a goal which was the deciding factor in the 1–16 to 0–15 defeat for Kilkenny. Walsh launched a stinging attack on referee Willie Horgan immediately after the game, describing his performance as "the worst exhibition I have ever witnessed in an All-Ireland final."

Walsh remained at the helm for the 1991–92 season but made a number of changes to his team. Substitute Pat O'Neill broke onto the starting fifteen as first-choice centre-back in place of Pat Dwyer who moved to full-back as a replacement for the retired John Henderson. These changes helped the team to a second successive Leinster Championship after a 3–16 to 2–09 defeat of Wexford in the final. For the second year in succession, Kilkenny qualified for the All-Ireland final where they faced Cork for the first time since 1978. The 3–10 to 1–12 victory gave Kilkenny their first All-Ireland Championship title in nine years and Walsh's first as manager.

After indicating his desire to remain as manager, Walsh was reappointed in October 1992. He bolstered his team by adding P. J. Delaney in place of retired full-forward Liam Fennelly, while Liam Keoghan was added to the defence as a replacement for Liam Walsh. Kilkenny remained undefeated in the Leinster Championship for a third successive year, with the team claiming the title after a 2–12 to 0–11 defeat of Wexford. Walsh later steered the team to a third successive All-Ireland final appearance and a third title in-a-row after the 2–17 to 1–15 defeat of Galway. In the aftermath of the All-Ireland victory, Walsh stated: "I think this team are good enough to go on and win four in-a-row. They have all the qualities to do so." In spite of this boast, Kilkenny found themselves in Division 2 of the 1993-94 National League, however, they did secure promotion to the top tier after finishing in second place. The quest for a third successive All-Ireland Championship ended with a four-point Leinster semi-final defeat by Offaly.

Walsh claimed a National League title as manager when Kilkenny defeated Clare by 2–12 to 0–09 in the final of the 1994-95 National League, however, Kilkenny once again failed to Offaly in the Leinster Championship. On 11 August 1995, Walsh announced his shock resignation as manager stating: "I think now is a good time to go."

== Personal life ==
Walsh met his wife, Olive Murphy, in the late 1950s and they married at St. John's Church in Kilkenny in September 1960. They lived in a house in Fatima Place in the city. They had three sons Michael, Oliver and Billy, and a daughter Anne. Michael also lined out in goal with the Kilkenny senior team and won two All-Ireland Championship medals under his father. Ollie's grandson, also called Ollie Walsh, has also lined out for the Kilkenny senior team.

== Death ==
On 9 March 1996, Walsh died at St. Luke's Hospital in Kilkenny after being taken ill at his home. After the news of his death, leading figures from the world of hurling paid tribute to him. Former Tipperary player and manager Babs Keating said he was "the best goalkeeper I have seen in my 40 years playing and watching the game." Former Cork player Gerald McCarthy described him as "a very flamboyant goalkeeper and a very nice man." Noel Skehan, Donie Nealon, Séamus Power and Pat Fanning all described his death as a loss to the game of hurling.

Walsh's funeral took place at St. Mary's Cathedral in Kilkenny on 12 March 1996. Among those in attendance were GAA president Jack Boothman, former GAA presidents, chairmen and secretaries of several county boards and Minister of State for Sport Bernard Allen, while Tommy Maher and Michael O'Brien were among the 25 priests who officiated.

== Recognition ==
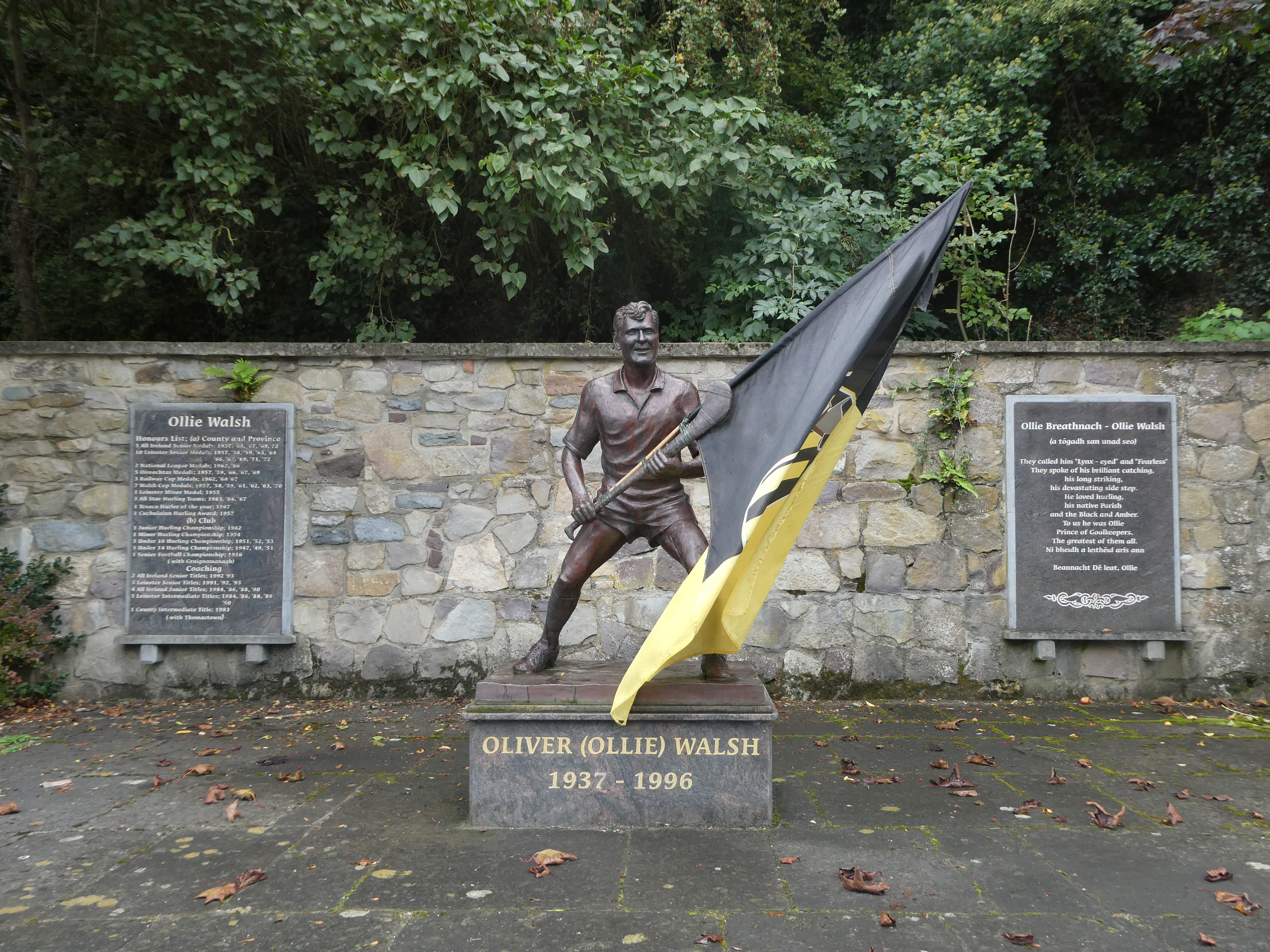
Statue and memorial in Thomastown

In retirement from playing, Walsh's reputation as one of the all-time greats continued to be maintained. His name was mentioned for possible inclusion on the Team of the Century in 1984 and the Team of the Millennium in 2000. Walsh was officially recognised as Kilkenny' greatest-ever goalkeeper when posthumously included on the Kilkenny Team of the Century in 2000. He was also posthumously honoured at Nowlan Park where the old stand was named the Breathnach Stand in his honour.

== Honours ==
=== As a player ===
Graignamanagh

- Kilkenny Senior Football Championship (1): 1956

Thomastown

- Kilkenny Junior Hurling Championship (1): 1962
- Kilkenny Minor Hurling Championship (1): 1954

Kilkenny

- All-Ireland Senior Hurling Championship (5): 1957, 1963, 1967, 1969, 1972
- Leinster Senior Hurling Championship (10): 1957, 1958, 1959, 1963, 1964, 1966, 1967, 1969, 1971, 1972
- National Hurling League (2): 1961-62, 1965-66
- Oireachtas Cup (5): 1957, 1959, 1966, 1967, 1969
- Walsh Cup (8): 1957, 1958, 1959, 1961, 1962, 1963, 1970, 1971
- Leinster Minor Hurling Championship (1): 1955

Leinster

- Railway Cup (4): 1962, 1964, 1965, 1967 (c)

Awards

- Texaco Hurler of the Year (1): 1967
- Gaelic Weekly All-Stars (3): 1963, 1964, 1967

=== As a manager ===
Kilkenny CBS

- All-Ireland Colleges Senior Hurling Championship (1): 1981
- Leinster Colleges Senior Hurling Championship (1): 1981

Thomastown

- Kilkenny Intermediate Hurling Championship (1): 1983

Kilkenny

- All-Ireland Senior Hurling Championship (2): 1992, 1993
- Leinster Senior Hurling Championship (3): 1991, 1992, 1993
- National Hurling League (1): 1994-95
- All-Ireland Junior Hurling Championship (4): 1984, 1986, 1988, 1990
- Leinster Junior Hurling Championship (5): 1984, 1986, 1988, 1989, 1990

Awards
Preceded by Justin McCarthy	Texaco Hurler of the Year; 1967	Succeeded by Dan Quigley
Sporting positions
Preceded by	Carlow Senior Hurling Manager; 1980-1982	Succeeded by
Preceded by Dermot Healy	Kilkenny Senior Hurling Manager; 1990–1995	Succeeded by Nickey Brennan
Achievements
Preceded by Jimmy Doyle	Railway Cup Hurling Final winning captain 1967	Succeeded by Mick Roche
Preceded by Babs Keating	All-Ireland Senior Hurling Final winning manager 1992–1993	Succeeded by Éamonn Cregan
