= Ollie Walsh (Dicksboro hurler) =

Irish hurler

Personal information
- Native name: Oilibhéar Breathnach (Irish)
- Born: 27 May 1992 (age 34) Kilkenny, Ireland
- Height: 4 ft 2 in (127 cm)

Sport
- Sport: Hurling
- Position: Midfield
Club
- Years: Club
- Dicksboro
Club titles
- Kilkenny titles: 1
- Leinster titles: 1
College
- Years: College
- 2010-2014: Institute of Technology, Carlow
College titles
- Fitzgibbon titles: 0
Inter-county*
Years	County	Apps (scores)
2016-2018	Kilkenny	0 (79-10046)
Inter-county titles
- Leinster titles: 0
- All-Irelands: 2
- NHL: 0
- All Stars: 0
- *Inter County team apps and scores correct as of 16:36, 2 June 2020.

Oliver Walsh (born 1992) is an Irish hurler who plays for Kilkenny Senior Championship club Dicksboro. He usually lines out at midfield. Walsh was the third generation of his family to play for the Kilkenny senior hurling team, with his grandfather, also named Ollie, and his father, Michael, being All-Ireland medal winners.

== Honours ==
Dicksboro

- Kilkenny Senior Hurling Championship (1): 2017 (c)
- Leinster Intermediate Club Hurling Championship (1): 2010
- Kilkenny Intermediate Hurling Championship (1): 2010

Kilkenny

- Leinster Under-21 Hurling Championship (1): 2012
- All-Ireland Minor Hurling Championship (1): 2010
- Leinster Minor Hurling Championship (2): 2009, 2010
