= Garry Scollard =

Irish hurler and Gaelic footballer

Personal information
- Born: Tralee, County Kerry

Sport
- Sport: Gaelic football
- Position: Forward
Club
- Years: Club
- 1960s–1970s: Austin Stacks
Club titles
- Kerry titles: 3
- Munster titles: 1
- All-Ireland Titles: 1
Inter-county
- Years: County
- Kerry

Garry Scollard (died 2000) was a Gaelic footballer and hurler from the Austin Stacks club in Tralee, County Kerry, Ireland. He was a member of the Austin Stacks team that won the 1977 All-Ireland Senior Club Football Championship, and of the Kerry county hurling team that won the 1976 All-Ireland Senior B Hurling Championship. Scollard was paralysed following a car accident in 1978. He died in February 2000, and an under-16 hurling competition was subsequently named the Gary Scollard Memorial Tournament.
