= 1993 All-Ireland Senior B Hurling Championship =

- Dates: 16 May – 11 July 1993
- Teams: 11
- Champions: Meath (1st title); Pat Potterton (captain); John Davis (manager)
- Runners-up: London

Tournament statistics
- Matches played: 11
- Goals scored: 36 (3.27 per match)
- Points scored: 284 (25.82 per match)
- Top scorer(s): Pat Potterton (0-38)

The 1993 All-Ireland Senior B Hurling Championship was the 20th staging of the All-Ireland Senior B Hurling Championship since its establishment by the Gaelic Athletic Association in 1974. The championship ran from 16 May to 11 July 1993.

Carlow were the defending champions, however, they availed of their right to promotion to the Leinster Senior Hurling Championship and did not field a team.

The All-Ireland final was played at the Emerald GAA Grounds in Ruislip on 11 July 1993 between Meath and London, in what was their second meeting in the All-Ireland final and a first meeting in eight years. Meath won the match by 2-16 to 1-16 to claim their very first All-Ireland title.

Meath's Pat Potterton was the championship's top scorer with 0-38.

== Results ==
=== All-Ireland preliminary round ===
16 May 1993 Preliminary round	Sligo	1-03 - 1-19	Roscommon	Markievicz Park
	M Galvin 1-1, P Seevers 0-2.		P Farrell 0-7, P Cuddy 0-5, M Lennon 1-0, N Cunningham 0-2, D Coyle 0-2, D Finneran 0-2, P Lyons 0-1.

16 May 1993 Preliminary round	Mayo	3-14 - 3-14	Armagh	Ballyhaunis Grounds
	J Henry 1-5, J Cunnane 1-3, K Heffernan 1-0, D Greally 0-3, C Greally 0-2, Dom Greally 0-1.		S Hughes 1-6, J McCormack 1-1, P Cunningham 1-0, D Shortt 0-3, G McCann 0-3, E McKeogh 0-1.

23 May 1993 Preliminary round replay	Armagh	1-16 - 1-10	Mayo	Athletic Grounds
	D Shortt 0-4, P Lavery 1-0, S Hughes 0-3, P Cunningham 0-3, G McCann 0-2, E McKee 0-1, J McCormack 0-1, O Lennon 0-1, P Lappin 0-1.		J Henry 0-5, M Trench 1-1, D Greally 0-1, G Greally 0-1, M Heffernan 0-1, C Collins 0-1.

=== All-Ireland quarter-finals ===
30 May 1993 Quarter-final	Roscommon	3-10 - 2-12	Armagh	Athleague Sportsfield
	D Logan 1-2, C Kelly 1-2, M Lennon 1-1, S Farrell 0-3, A Kelly 0-1, D Coyle 0-1.		S Hughes 0-9, P Cunningham 2-0, J Cormack 0-2, T Lappin 0-1.

30 May 1993 Quarter-final	Kildare	2-06 - 2-21	Meath	Geraldine Park
	G Deering 0-4, A Murphy 1-0, K Kelly 1-0, M Donovan 0-1, M Mulally 0-1.		P Potterton 0-9, M Smith 0-7, M Cole 1-2, J McCaffrey 1-1, P Cahill 0-1, P Kelly 0-1.

30 May 1993 Quarter-final	Westmeath	0-17 - 0-07	Wicklow	Castletown Grounds
	D Kilcoyne 0-9, P Clancy 0-2, B Kennedy 0-2, D Gillen 0-2, S McLoughlin 0-1, R Galvin 0-1.		D Hyland 0-4, N Byrne 0-1, S Byrne 0-1, J O'Neill 0-1.

6 June 1993 Quarter-final	Derry	2-21 - 3-09	Monaghan	Celtic Park
	G Biggs 2-8, O Collins 0-8, R McCluskey 0-2, M Cassidy 0-1, S O'Neill 0-1, B Regan 0-1.		M O'Dowd 2-2, E Murnane 1-1, G Curley 0-3, P McShane 0-1, F Walsh 0-1, J Hennessy 0-1.

=== All-Ireland semi-finals ===
12 June 1993 Semi-final	Derry	2-08 - 0-18	Meath	Gerard McGleenan Park
	J Biggs 0-5, B Regan 1-0, J Dillon 1-0, J Mullan 0-2, M Cassidy 0-1.		P Potterton 0-12, R Kelly 0-2, P Kelly 0-2, M Murphy 0-1, M Smith 0-1.

13 June 1993 Semi-final	Roscommon	0-04 - 4-14	Westmeath	Duggan Park
	C Kelly 0-3, M Cunniffe 0-1.		D Kilcoyne 0-7, D Gillen 2-0, R Galvin 1-1, S McLoughlin 1-1, P Clancy 0-3, E Gallagher 0-2.

=== All-Ireland home final ===
27 June 1993 Home final	Meath	2-17 - 1-12	Westmeath	O'Connor Park
	M Cole 2-0, P Potterton 0-6, M Massey 0-3, P Kelly 0-3, R Kelly 0-2, J Gorry 0-1, J McCaffrey 0-1, C Sheridan 0-1.		D Kilcoyne 1-7, D Gillen 0-3, P Clancy 0-1, E Gallagher 0-1.	Referee: J O'Leary (Cork)

=== All-Ireland final ===
11 July 1993 Final	London	1-16 - 2-16	Meath	Emerald GAA Grounds
	T Moloney 0-8, C Spain 1-2, M Carroll 0-3, D Power 0-1, M Fleming 0-1, D Larkin 0-1.		P Potterton 0-11, P Kelly 1-4, R Kelly 1-1.

== Championship statistics ==
=== Top scorers ===
Overall

Rank	Player	Team	Tally	Total	Matches	Average
1	Pat Potterton	Meath	0-38	38	4	9.50
2	David Kilcoyne	Westmeath	1-23	26	3	8.66
3	Seán Hughes	Armagh	1-18	21	3	7.00
4	Gregory Biggs	Derry	2-13	19	2	9.50
5	Joe Henry	Mayo	1-10	13	2	6.50
5	Paddy Kelly	Mayo	1-10	13	4	3.25
7	Pat Cunningham	Armagh	3-03	12	3	4.00
8	Michael Cole	Meath	3-02	11	4	2.75
8	Declan Gillen	Westmeath	2-05	11	3	3.66

In a single game

Rank	Player	Team	Tally	Total	Opposition
1	Gregory Biggs	Derry	2-08	14	Monaghan
2	Pat Potterton	Meath	0-12	12	Derry
3	Pat Potterton	Meath	0-11	11	London
4	David Kilcoyne	Westmeath	1-07	10	Meath
5	Seán Hughes	Armagh	1-06	9	Mayo
5	Seán Hughes	Armagh	0-09	9	Roscommon
5	David Kilcoyne	Westmeath	0-09	9	Wicklow
5	Pat Potterton	Meath	0-09	9	Kildare
9	Mick O'Dowd	Monaghan	2-02	8	Derry
9	Joe Henry	Mayo	1-05	8	Armagh
9	Ollie Collins	Derry	0-08	8	Monaghan
9	Timmy Moloney	London	0-08	8	Meath
