= 1994 All-Ireland Senior B Hurling Championship =

- Dates: 22 May - 3 July 1994
- Teams: 5
- Champions: Roscommon (1st title); Mickey Cunniffe (captain); Michael Kelly (manager)
- Runners-up: London

Tournament statistics
- Matches played: 5
- Goals scored: 16 (3.2 per match)
- Points scored: 124 (24.8 per match)
- Top scorer(s): Declan Coyle (2-13)

The 1994 All-Ireland Senior B Hurling Championship was the 21st staging of the All-Ireland Senior B Hurling Championship since its establishment by the Gaelic Athletic Association in 1974. The championship ran from 22 May to 3 July 1994.

Meath were the defending champions, however, they availed of their right to promotion to the Leinster Senior Hurling Championship and did not field a team.

The All-Ireland final was played at the Emerald GAA Grounds in Ruislip on 3 July 1994 between Roscommon and London, in what was their first ever meeting in the All-Ireland final. Roscommon won the match by 1-10 to 1-09 to claim their very first All-Ireland title.

Roscommon's Declan Coyle was the championship's top scorer with 2-13.

== Results ==
=== All-Ireland quarter-final ===
| 22 May 1994 Quarter-final | Derry | 2-12 - 2-12 | Kildare | Dean McGlinchey Park |
| | B Young 0-5, O Collins 1-1, M McKenna 1-0, J McGonigle 0-3, J Donaghy 0-1, M Collins 0-1, P McEldowney 0-1. | | E Kelly 2-0, M Curtin 0-7, M Moloney 0-2, K Kelly 0-1, C Byrne 0-1, R Wonders 0-1. |

| 29 May 1994 Quarter-final replay | Kildare | w/o - scr. | Derry | St. Conleth's Park |

=== All-Ireland semi-finals ===
| 5 June 1994 Semi-final | Roscommon | 4-18 - 1-06 | Mayo | Dr. Hyde Park |
| | D Coyle 2-7, P Tiernan 1-1, R Mulry 1-0, G Coyle 0-2, L Murray 0-2, J Mannion 0-2, F Farrell 0-1, T Killian 0-1, P Feeney 0-1, M Cunniffe 0-1. | | | Referee: P Lynch (Galway) |

| 5 June 1994 Semi-final | Kildare | 1-20 - 1-09 | Armagh | Drogheda Park |
| | C Byrne 0-7, G Deering 0-6, R Byrne 1-1, J Kinlon 0-2, D O'Toole 0-2, E Kelly 0-2. | | E McKee 0-4, M Grimes 1-0, V Mone 0-2, D Shortt 0-2, G McCann 0-1. | Referee: A Mac Suibhne (Dublin) |

=== All-Ireland home final ===
| 19 June 1994 Home final | Roscommon | 2-16 - 1-12 | Kildare | O'Connor Park |
| | J Mannion 1-5, D Keyes 1-1, D Coyle 0-4, M Cunniffe 0-3, L Murray 0-2, P Kiernan 0-1. | | J Devenney 1-0, E Kelly 0-3, N Swan 0-2, G Deering 0-2, C Byrne 0-2, R Byrne 0-1, P Hayden 0-1, K Kelly 0-1. | Referee: P Delaney (Laois) |

=== All-Ireland final ===
| 3 July 1994 Final | London | 1-09 - 1-10 | Roscommon | Emerald GAA Grounds |
| | T Moloney 0-4, S Daly 1-0, A Comerford 0-2, C Spain 0-2, M Carroll 0-1. | | D Keyes 1-0, M Cunniffe 0-3, P Feeney 0-2, D Coyle 0-2, J Mannion 0-1, L Murray 0-1, T Killeen 0-1. | Referee: P O'Connor (Limerick) |

== Championship statistics ==
=== Top scorers ===
Overall

| Rank | Player | County | Tally | Total | Matches | Average |
|---|---|---|---|---|---|---|
| 1 | Declan Coyle | Roscommon | 2-13 | 19 | 3 | 6.33 |
| 2 | Éamonn Kelly | Kildare | 2-05 | 11 | 3 | 3.66 |
| 2 | Joe Mannion | Roscommon | 1-08 | 11 | 3 | 3.66 |
| 4 | Colm Byrne | Kildare | 0-10 | 10 | 3 | 3.33 |
| 5 | Greg Deering | Kildare | 0-08 | 8 | 3 | 2.66 |

=== Miscellaneous ===
- Derry withdrew midway through the championship after being unable to field a team for their All-Ireland quarter-final replay with Kildare.
