= Christy Walsh (hurler) =

Irish hurler

Personal information
- Born: County Kerry, Ireland
- Height: 6 ft 3 in (191 cm)

Sport
- Sport: Hurling
- Position: Forward
Club
- Years: Club
- Kilmoyley
Club titles
- Kerry titles: 4
Inter-county
Years	County	Apps (scores)
1983–1998	Kerry	13
Inter-county titles
- Munster titles: 0
- All-Irelands: 0
- All Stars: 0

Christy Walsh is an Irish former hurler who played with Kerry and Kilmoyley. He also played football with Ardfert and the Kerry Junior team between the 1980s and the 2000s.

== Club ==
Walsh had a long career with Kilmoyley. Despite being one of Kerry's most successful clubs, it looked as if Walsh would finish his career without a Kerry Senior Hurling Championship title. In 2001 Kilmoyley qualified for the final for the first time since 1988 where they faced holders Ballyheigue. At full time Walsh received his first championship medal.

Walsh and Kilmoyley were back in the final again in 2002 where they faced Lixnaw in the final. Walsh won his second medal after defeating Lixnaw.

2003 would be another successful season for Walsh and Kimoyley. For the second season in a row, Kilmoyley and Lixnaw faced each other in the final. Walsh had his third championship medal after a 2-10 to 1-05 win.

In 2004 Walsh lined out in his fourth final in a row against Cauesway. By now he was being used as an impact substitute, and he helped his team by scoring 1-02 in a 3-15 to 2-09 win and received a fourth winner's medal.

He also lined out with Bennettsbridge in Kilkenny.

He also played club football with Ardfert with whom he won a Kerry Junior Football Championship title in 1987. He also played with the St Brendan's Board divisional side. He was captain of the side who qualified for the 1992 Kerry Senior Football Championship final but lost out to Mid Kerry.

== Intercounty ==
=== Hurling ===
Walsh first joined the Kerry senior team in 1983. He was part of the side that won the 1983 All-Ireland Senior B Hurling Championship with a win over London. Kerry went on to face Antrim in the All-Ireland Preliminary Round but lost out on a 3-13 to 2-10 scoreline.

He had little success until he won the 1986 All-Ireland Senior B Hurling Championship with a win again over London. Kerry faced Galway in the All-Ireland quarterfinals but suffered a heavy loss.

Kerry returned to the Munster Senior Hurling Championship in 1987 for the first time since 1978. A loss to Tipperary was Walsh's only match.

A heavy loss to Limerick in the 1988 Munster Senior Hurling Championship followed as Kerry were eliminated in the first round.

The 1988–89 National Hurling League campaign was a disappointing one for Kerry heading into the championship. However, they put up a good display before going down to Limerick for the second season in a row on a 6-11 to 3-10 scoreline.

Over the next few seasons Kerry and Walsh put in some good showings in the Munster Championship but came up short against Cork in 1990 and Waterford in 1991.

By 1993 Walsh was one of Kerry's main players. A good 1992–93 National Hurling League saw Kerry lose out in a good showing against Tipperary in the quarterfinal. In the Munster Championship Walsh's side faced Waterford. At full time Kerry had their first championship win since 1926 on a 4-13 to 3-13 scoreline. Kerry lost in the semi-final to Tipperary.

In the next few seasons Kerry put in some good displays but couldn't repeat their 1993 win and by the late 90s Walsh ended his Kerry career.

=== Football ===
Walsh also played football at junior level with Kerry. He however had little success as a semi-final loss to Tipperary in 1988 and a Munster final loss to Cork in 1989 were his lot.

== Interprovincial ==
Walsh lined out with Munster in the Railway Cup in the 80s and 90s.

He first lined out during the 1986 staging of the championship. On that occasion Munster lost out to Connacht in the final. He lined out in 1991 where once again Munster lost out to Connacht in the final.

He was back in 1992 and again Munster made the final where they faced Ulster. A 3-13 to 1-09 win gave Walsh a winner's medal, and until 2016 he was the only Kerry player to win a medal on the field of play.

== Management ==
In retirement Walsh became involved in management in both football and hurling at club and inter-county level.

=== Bennettsbridge ===
Walsh became manager of Bennettsbridge in 2012. Once one of the top sides in the county when Walsh took over they had dropped down to the Junior grade. He led his side to back-to-back Kilkenny Premier Junior Hurling Championship finals to Thomastown in 2012 and Lisdowney in 2013. They were back in the final again in 2014 this time against Mooncoin. At full time Bennettsbridge won out on a 1-17 to 1-07 scoreline. Benettsbridge later qualified for the Leinster Junior Club Hurling Championship final. A 1-20 to 0-03 win over Offaly side Shamrocks saw his side take provincial honors. Walsh led his side to an All-Ireland Junior Club Hurling Championship final showdown with Fullen Gaels in Croke Park. A 3-19 to 1-08 win saw the title go to Walsh and the Kilkenny men.

There was to be more success in 2015 as Walsh and Bennettsbridge qualified for the Kilkenny Intermediate Hurling Championship final where they faced St Patrick's. The sides ended level on a 0-20 to 3-11 scoreline. In the replay the title went to Walsh's side on a 1-16 to 1-14 scoreline. For the second season in a row Bennettsbridge found themselves in a provincial final this time in the Leinster Intermediate Club Hurling Championship. They faced Meath side Kiltale in the final. A 1-14 to 0-13 win give Walsh and his side another Leinster title. Walsh and the Bridge were back in Croke Park for the 2016 All-Ireland Intermediate Club Hurling Championship final. They faced Abbeyknockmoy from Galway and took the title after a 1-17 to 1-14 win.

After a hugely successful time in charge Walsh stood down from his position at the end of 2017.

=== Laois ===
In 2016 he was appointed manager of the Laois minor hurling team ahead of the 2017 season.

He led the side to the 2017 All-Ireland Minor Hurling Championship semi-final where they suffered a heavy loss to Kilkenny.

=== Kilkenny ===
Walsh has long been manager of the Kilkenny football team and has had success during his time in charge.

He had much success in the All-Britain Football Championship winning the titles in 2015, 2017 and 2018.

After a change to the All-Ireland Junior Football Championship Walsh led his side to victory in the 2022 All-Ireland Junior Football Championship final after a win over New York in the final in Croke Park.

He also led the side to the 2023 All-Ireland Junior Football Championship final in a repeat tie with New York but lost out. He was reappointed to the role once more for the 2025 season.

== Sources ==
- Donegan, Des, The Complete Handbook of Gaelic Games (DBA Publications Limited, 2005).
