= 1980 All-Ireland Senior B Hurling Championship =

- Dates: 11 May - 6 July 1980
- Teams: 10
- Champions: Kildare (2nd title); Dom Maguire (captain)
- Runners-up: London

Tournament statistics
- Matches played: 10
- Goals scored: 49 (4.9 per match)
- Points scored: 235 (23.5 per match)
- Top scorer(s): Johnny Walsh (0-34)

The 1980 All-Ireland Senior B Hurling Championship was the seventh staging of the All-Ireland Senior B Hurling Championship since its establishment by the Gaelic Athletic Association in 1974. The championship ran from 11 May to 6 July 1980.

The All-Ireland final was played at the Croke Park in Dublin on 6 July 1980 between Kildare and London, in what was their first ever meeting in the All-Ireland final. Kildare won the match by 2-20 to 2-14 to claim their second All-Ireland title overall and a first title in six years.

Kildare's Johnny Walsh was the championship's top scorer with 0-34.

== Results ==
=== All-Ireland first round ===
11 May 1980 First round	Westmeath	4-13 - 2-02	Armagh	Cusack Park
	J Egan 3-0, M Ryan 1-2, G Jackson 0-5, P Dalton 0-2, M Cosgrave 0-2, W Shanley 0-1, S Fagan 0-1.		J Corvan 1-1, B McDonald 1-0, J Christie 0-1.

11 May 1980 First round	Meath	2-09 - 3-07	Down	St Loman's Park
	F McCann 1-3, J Norris 1-2, J Ennis 0-2, C Maguire 0-2.		B Mullan 1-4, B Coulter 2-0, J Conlon 0-1, D Mullan 0-1, C O'Flynn 0-1.

=== All-Ireland quarter-finals ===
18 May 1980 Quarter-final	Antrim	2-14 - 1-12	Westmeath	St Patrick's Park
				Referee: B Crawford (Down)

18 May 1980 Quarter-final	Kerry	4-15 - 2-03	Roscommon	Austin Stack Park
	J O'Sullivan 1-4, P Moriarty 2-0, L O'Mahony 1-2, J O'Grady 0-3, T Nolan 0-2, DJ Leahy 0-1, J Kelly 0-1, J Kirby 0-1, J Carroll 0-1.		S Kilroy 1-1, P Dolan 1-0, P Kelly 0-1, Paudie Kelly 0-1.

18 May 1980 Quarter-final	Kildare	6-19 - 2-08	Down	St Conleth's Park
	J Tompkins 1-7, D Maguire 3-0, T Carew 1-3, J O'Connor 0-3, J Walsh 0-3, T White 0-2, N Walsh 0-1.		B Mullen 0-6, J Conlon 1-0, C O'Flynn 1-0, D Mullen 0-1, B Coulter 0-1.

18 May 1980 Quarter-final	Carlow	0-14 - 1-03	Wicklow	Dr Cullen Park
	E Quirke 0-4, M Murphy 0-4, E Hession 0-2, P Quirke 0-1, W Cullen 0-1, R Moore 0-1, J Gorman 0-1.		D Gorman 1-0, S Brennan 0-1, S Keogh 0-1, J Sullivan 0-1.

=== All-Ireland semi-finals ===
8 June 1980 Semi-final	Carlow	1-17 - 2-09	Kerry	Seán Treacy Park
	M Murphy 0-8, P Cassins 1-1, E Quirke 0-2, E Hession 0-2, J O'Hara 0-1, W Cullen 0-1, J Kavanagh 0-1, P Quirke 0-1.		P Moriarty 1-6, L O'Mahony 1-2, T Nolan 0-1.

8 June 1980 Semi-final	Kildare	3-09 - 2-10	Antrim	Croke Park
	J Walsh 0-7, D Maguire 1-1, P White 1-0, M Moore 1-0, J Tompkins 0-1.		E Donnelly 2-1, M O'Connell 0-2, B Donnelly 0-2, B Lavery 0-1, M McGaughney 0-1, P Donnelly 0-1, P Boyle 0-1, R McDonnell 0-1.

=== All-Ireland home final ===
15 June 1980 Home final	Kildare	5-21 - 3-16	Carlow	O'Connor Park
	J Walsh 0-12, J Tompkins 2-1, T Carew 1-3, T White 1-2, F Deering 1-0, T Johnson 0-1, J O'Connell 0-1, N Walsh 0-1.		M Murphy 0-9, E Quirke 2-2, P Cassins 1-0, W Cullen 0-2, M Delaney 0-1, J Kavanagh 0-1, J O'Hara 0-1.

=== All-Ireland final ===
6 July 1980 Final	Kildare	2-20 - 2-14	London	Croke Park
	J Walsh 0-12, T White 1-2, T Carew 1-2, J O'Connell 0-2, J Maguire 0-1, T Tompkins 0-1.		F Canning 0-6, M Linnane 1-1, M Hughes 1-1, B Gilligan 0-2, F McCormack 0-1, L Moloney 0-1, M Blake 0-1, F Fahy 0-1.	Referee: J Denton (Wexford)

== Sources ==
- Donegan, Des, The Complete Handbook of Gaelic Games (DBA Publications Limited, 2005).
