= 2004 All-Ireland Senior B Hurling Championship =

Tournament details
- Country: Ireland; England

Final positions
- Champions: Kildare
- Runner-up: Mayo

The 2004 All-Ireland Senior B Hurling Championship was the 26th staging of the All-Ireland Senior B Hurling Championship, Ireland's secondary hurling knock-out competition. Kildare won the championship, beating Mayo 3-14 to 3-7 in the final at Croke Park, Dublin.

== Results ==
=== All-Ireland Senior B Hurling Championship ===
Semifinal			Final
			1C	Mayo	3-07
1L	Kildare	1-18	1L	Kildare	3-14
2L	Wicklow	3-08

July 24
Semi-final

Kildare	1-18 – 3-8	Wicklow

Dr. Cullen Park, Carlow

July 24
Final

Kildare	3-14 – 3-7	Mayo
T. Murphy (2-0), A. McAndrew (0-5), B. Byrne (1-1), B. White (0-3), C. Buggy (0-2), E. Denieffe (0-1), C. Divilly (0-1), J. Brennan (0-1).		A. Freeman (1-2), K. Higgins (0-5), S. Broderick (1-0), P. Higgins (1-0).

Croke Park, Dublin
