= 1976 All-Ireland Senior B Hurling Championship =

Tournament details
- Country: Ireland; England
- Teams: 6

Final positions
- Champions: Kerry
- Runner-up: London

Tournament statistics
- Matches played: 5

The 1976 All-Ireland Senior B Hurling Championship was the third staging of Ireland's secondary hurling knock-out competition. Kerry won the championship, beating London 0–15 to 1–10 in the final at Croke Park, Dublin.

== The championship ==
=== Participating teams ===
Province	County	Stadium	Most recent success	
Province	County	Stadium	All-Ireland 'B'	1974 rankings
Connacht	Roscommon	Dr. Hyde Park		Beaten by Kerry in the quarter-final
Munster	Kerry	Austin Stack Park		Beaten by eventual champions Westmeath in the 'home' final
Leinster	Carlow	Dr. Cullen Park		Beaten by Meath in the quarter-final
	Laois	O'Moore Park		Did not participate
Ulster	Antrim	Corrigan Park		Beaten by eventual champions Westmeath in the semi-final
Britain	London	Emerald Grounds		Beaten by Westmeath in a replay of the final

=== Format ===
Quarter-final: (1 match) This is a lone game between the two first teams drawn. One team is eliminated at this stage while the winners advance to the semi-final.

Semi-finals: (2 matches) The winners of the lone quarter final join the three other teams to make up the semi-final pairings. Two teams are eliminated at this stage while the two winners advance to the 'home' final.

Home final: (1 match) The winners of the two semi-finals contest this game. One team is eliminated at this stage while the winners advance to the 'proper' All-Ireland final.

Final: (1 match) The winners of the All-Ireland 'home' final join London to contest this game. One team is eliminated at this stage while the winners are allowed to participate in the All-Ireland SHC quarter-final.

== Fixtures ==
=== All-Ireland Senior B Hurling Championship ===
May 9
Quarter-Final

Kerry	3-12 – 3-11	Laois
T. Nolan (1-3), G. Scollard (1-1), R. Hussey (1-1), P. Moriarty (0-3), M. Brick (0-2), J. O'Sullivan (0-2).		P. Dillon (1-7), P. Dowling (1-0), M. Brophy (1-0), G. Lenihan (0-2), P. Kelly (0-1), M. Mahon (0-1).

Austin Stack Park, Tralee
Referee: S. O'Grady (Limerick)

May 30
Semi-Final

Kerry	5-11 – 1-5	Roscommon
G. Scollard (3-2), R. Hussey (1-1), J. Sullivan (1-0), M. Brick (0-2), T. Nolan (0-2), M. Brick (0-2), S. Harris (0-1), P. J. Houlihan (0-1).		G. Naughton (1-0), J. Kilroy (0-3), S. Kilroy (0-1), J. Coyne (0-1).

Cusack Park, Ennis
Referee: M. Slattery (Clare)

May 30
Semi-Final

Antrim	6-10 – 0-12	Carlow
E. Donnelly (2-9), A. Thornbury (2-0), A. Hamill (1-1), J. O'Neill (1-0).		W. Cullen (0-4), E. Quirke (0-3), T. Kelly (0-2), T. Byrne (0-2), P. Cassins (0-1).

Croke Park, Dublin
Referee: N. O'Donoghue (Dublin)

June 13
Home Final

Kerry	2-17 – 3-8	Antrim
P. Moriarty (1-2), J. M. Brick (0-5), J. Bunyan (0-5), T. Nolan (1-0), D. Scollard (0-3), M. Brick (0-1), F. Donovan (0-1).		E. Donnelly (3-5), A. Hamill (0-2), J. Fagan (0-1).

Croke Park, Dublin
Referee: C. Foley (Dublin)

June 27
Final

Kerry	0-15 – 1-10	London
T. Nolan (0-9), J. Bunyan (0-2), J. Carroll (0-1), P. Cronin (0-1), J. McBrick (0-1), M. Brick (0-1).		F. Canning (1-5), O. Fox (0-2), S. Collins (0-1), R. Cashin (0-1), L. Corless (0-1).

Croke Park, Dublin
Referee: N. O'Donoghue (Dublin)

== Championship statistics ==
=== Scoring ===
- Widest winning margin: 18 points
  - Kerry 5-11 : 1-5 Roscommon (All-Ireland semi-final)
- Most goals in a match: 6
  - Kerry 3-12 : 3-11 Laois (All-Ireland quarter-final)
  - Kerry 5-11 : 1-5 Roscommon (All-Ireland semi-final)
  - Antrim 6-10 : 0-12 Carlow (All-Ireland semi-final)
- Most points in a match: 25
  - Kerry 2-17 : 3-8 Antrim (All-Ireland 'home' final)
  - Kerry 0-15 : 1-10 London (All-Ireland final)
- Most goals by one team in a match: 6
  - Antrim 6-10 : 0-12 Carlow (All-Ireland semi-final)
- Most goals scored by a losing team: 3
  - Laois 3-11 : 3-12 Kerry (All-Ireland quarter-final)
  - Antrim 3-8 : 2-17 Kerry (All-Ireland 'home' final)
- Most points scored by a losing team: 12
  - Carlow 0-12 : 6-10 Antrim (All-Ireland semi-final)

== Top scorers ==
=== Season ===
Rank	Player	County	Tally	Total	Matches	Average
1	Eddie Donnelly	Antrim	5-14	29	2	14.50
2	Tom Nolan	Kerry	2-14	20	4	5.00
3	Gary Scollard	Kerry	4-6	18	4	4.50
