= 1977 All-Ireland Senior B Hurling Championship =

Tournament details
- Country: Ireland; England
- Teams: 8

Final positions
- Champions: Laois
- Runner-up: London

Tournament statistics
- Matches played: 8

The 1977 All-Ireland Senior B Hurling Championship was the fourth staging of Ireland's secondary hurling knock-out competition. Laois won the championship, beating London 3–21 to 2–9 in the final at Croke Park, Dublin.

== The championship ==
=== Format ===
First round: (3 matches) These are three matches between the first six participating teams. Three teams are eliminated at this stage while the three winning teams qualify for the semi-final stages.

Semi-finals: (2 matches) The three winners from the first-round games join a fourth team who received a bye to this stage to contest the semi-finals. Two teams are eliminated at this stage while the two winners advance to the 'home' final.

Home final: (1 match) The winners of the two semi-finals contest this game. One team is eliminated at this stage while the winners advance to the 'proper' All-Ireland final.

Final: (1 match) The winners of the All-Ireland 'home' final join London to contest this game. One team is eliminated at this stage while the winners are allowed to participate in the All-Ireland SHC quarter-final.

== Fixtures ==
=== All-Ireland Senior B Hurling Championship ===
May 15
First Round

Antrim	5-14 – 0-17	Meath
J. Crossey (1-3), A. Hamill (0-5), P. Boyle (1-1), A. McCallin (1-1), A. Thornbury (1-1), R. McDonnell (1-0), V. Denny (0-2), J. Fagan (0-1).		S. Kearney (0-11), D. Breen (0-2), T. J. Reilly (0-2), F. McCann (0-1), N. O'Riordan (0-1).

Casement Park, Belfast

May 15
First Round

Roscommon	2-10 – 1-13	Wicklow
J. Kilroy (2-1), S. Kilroy (0-5), B. Tansey (0-3), F. Mee (0-1).		P. Doyle (0-9), M. Honan (1-0), J. Sullivan (0-2), D. Murphy (0-1), S. Keogh (0-1).

Athleague

May 15
First Round

Carlow	0-8 – 2-10	Down
J. Kavanagh (0-3), E. Quirke (0-1), W. Cullen (0-1), J. Doyle (0-1), D. Dunne (0-1), P. McNally (0-1).		B. Gilmore (1-2), T. Brown (1-1), R. Mullan (0-3), M. Smith (0-1), P. Lennon (0-1), J. Hughes (0-1), C. O'Flynn (0-1).

Dr. Cullen Park, Carlow

May 22
First Round Reply

Wicklow	3-18 – 3-10	Roscommon
P. Doyle (0-6), P. Brennan (1-2), T. Sullivan (1-2), M. Hogan (1-1), M. Jordan (0-3), S. Doyle (0-3), M. Doyle (0-1).		S. Kilroy (1-7), D. Tansey (1-0), M. Reynolds (1-0), F. Mee (0-2), O. Hanley (0-1).

Aughrim County Ground, Aughrim
Referee: S. Brennan (Galway)

May 29
Semi-Final

Antrim	2-17 – 2-8	Down
A. McCallin (1-5), E. Donnelly (1-3), J. Crossey (0-3), A. Hamill (0-3), P. Boyle (0-2), J. Fagan (0-1).		B. Mullen (0-6), B. Gilmore (1-1), G. Lennon (1-0), D. Mullin (0-1).

Pearse Park, Dunloy

May 29
Semi-Final

Laois	4-10 – 1-10	Wicklow
M. Walsh (1-4), M. Cuddy (2-0), J. Mahon (1-0), F. Bates (0-3), P. Dillon (0-1), A. Lanham (0-1), M. Ahern (0-1).		M. Hogan (1-0), M. Jordan (0-3), P. Doyle (0-3), S. Doyle (0-2), J. Morrissey (0-1), M. Doyle (0-1).

Dr. Cullen Park, Carlow
Referee: J. Murphy (Kilkenny)

June 12
Home Final

Laois	2-14 – 0-11	Antrim
P. Dillon (1-4), J. Mahon (0-5), A. Lanham (1-0), M. Walsh (0-2), M. Ahern (0-1), P. Kelly (0-1), M. Mahon (0-1).		E. Donnelly (0-5), P. Boyle (0-2), A. McCallin (0-1), J. Dillon (0-1), R. McDonald (0-1), J. Crossey (0-1).

Croke Park, Dublin

June 26
Final

Laois	3-21 – 2-9	London
P. Dillon (0-13), J. Mahon (1-1), L. Lannon (1-0), M. Cuddy (1-0), M. Walsh (0-3), M. Ahern (0-2), P. Kelly (0-2).		F. Canning (1-4), P. O'Neill (1-0), L. Coless (0-2), M. Jordan (0-1), O. Fox (0-1), J. Lynch (0-1).

Croke Park, Dublin
Referee: N. O'Donoghue (Dublin)
