= Aidan Healy =

Kerry hurler

Personal information
- Born: Abbeydorney, County Kerry

Sport
- Sport: Hurling
- Position: Back
Club
- Years: Club
- 2000s: Abbeydorney
Inter-county
Years	County	Apps (scores)
2002–2010	Kerry	20 (0–0)
Inter-county titles
- Munster titles: 0
- All-Irelands: 0

Aidan Healy is an Irish hurling selector and former player. He played for the Kerry county team and the Abbeydorney club. He won a Champion 15 Award in 2006. He was part of the Abbeydorney team that made it to the 2005 Kerry Senior Hurling Championship, but lost out after a re-play to Lixnaw

He became a selector for John Griffin's newly appointed Kerry senior management team in 2024.
