= 1975 All-Ireland Senior B Hurling Championship =

Tournament details
- Country: Ireland; England
- Teams: 9

Final positions
- Champions: Westmeath
- Runner-up: London

Tournament statistics
- Matches played: 9

The 1975 All-Ireland Senior B Hurling Championship was the second staging of Ireland's secondary hurling knock-out competition. Westmeath won the championship, beating London 3–23 to 2–7 in a replayed final at Croke Park, Dublin.

== The championship ==
=== Participating teams ===
Province	County	Stadium	Most recent success	
Province	County	Stadium	All-Ireland 'B'	1974 rankings
Connacht	Roscommon	Dr. Hyde Park		Did not participate
Munster	Kerry	Austin Stack Park		Beaten by eventual champions Kildare in the first round
Leinster	Carlow	Dr. Cullen Park		Beaten by Meath in the first round
	Meath	St. Loman's Park		Beaten by eventual champions Kildare in the quarter-final
	Westmeath	Cusack Park		Beaten by eventual champions Kildare in the semi-final
	Wicklow	Aughrim County Ground		Beaten by eventual runners-up Antrim in the first round
Ulster	Antrim	Corrigan Park		Beaten by eventual champions Kildare in the final
	Down	McKenna Park		Beaten by Westmeath in the first round
Britain	London	Emerald Grounds		Did not participate

=== Format ===
Quarter-finals: (4 matches) These are four matches between the eight native participating teams. Four teams are eliminated at this stage while the four winning teams qualify for the semi-final stages.

Semi-finals: (2 matches) The four winners from the quarter-finals contest these games. Two teams are eliminated at this stage while the two winners advance to the 'home' final.

Home final: (1 match) The winners of the two semi-finals contest this game. One team is eliminated at this stage while the winners advance to the 'proper' All-Ireland final.

Final: (1 match) The winners of the All-Ireland 'home' final join London to contest this game. One team is eliminated at this stage while the winners are allowed to participate in the All-Ireland SHC quarter-final.

== All-Ireland Senior B Hurling Championship ==
=== Quarter-finals ===
April 20
Quarter-Final

Westmeath	3-9 – 1-6	Down
M. Fagan (1-5), C. Connaughton (1-2), N. Fitzsimons (1-0), T. Corrigan (0-1), M. Kilcoyne (0-1).		Gerry Lennon (1-0), B. Mullen (0-2), W. Smyth (0-2), B. Gilmore (0-1), Gerard Lennon (0-1).

Cusack Park, Mullingar
Referee: G. Kirwan (Offaly)

April 20
Quarter-Final

Carlow	0-6 – 1-11	Meath
P. McNally (0-2), T. Byrne (0-1), T. Kelly (0-1), T. Collier (0-1), J. Doyle (0-1).		J. Doherty (1-4), M. Martin (0-2), E. Priest (0-2), P. J. Reilly (0-2), S. Kearney (0-1).

Dr. Cullen Park, Carlow
Referee: R. Dowling (Kilkenny)

April 20
Quarter-Final

Antrim	5-11 – 1-6	Wicklow
C. McDonnell (2-2), J. Fagan (1-1), E. Dornan (0-4), J. Cunningham (1-0), R. McDonnell (1-0), J. O'Neill (0-2), A. Thornbury (0-1), P. McIlhatton (0-1).		M. Lawlor (1-2), T. Kennedy (0-2), M. Doyle (0-1), S. Doyle (0-1).

Corrigan Park, Belfast
Referee: T. O'Riordan (Dublin)

April 20
Quarter-Final

Roscommon	2-2 – 4-12	Kerry
F. Mitchell (1-0), B. Mitchell (1-0), H. Cox (0-1), C. McConn (0-1).		John Martin Brick (1-5), P. J. McIntyre (2-0), P. Moriarty (0-4), C. Nolan (1-0), B. Twomey (0-1), J. Bunyan (0-1), J. O'Grady (0-1).

Dr. Hyde Park, Roscommon
Referee: P. Robinson (Galway)

=== Semi-finals ===
May 4
Semi-Final

Westmeath	2-22 – 2-17	Antrim
C. Connaughton (1-8), M. Fagan (0-8), M. Flanagan (1-0), M. Kilcoyne (0-2), G. Whelan (0-2), P. Curran (0-1), D. Smith (0-1).		E. Donnelly (1-10), W. Richmond (1-1), E. Dornan (0-3), A. Thornbury (0-1), M. McKillop (0-1), J. Fagan (0-1).

Croke Park, Dublin
Referee: M. Kelleher (Kildare)

May 4
Semi-Final

Kerry	2-14 – 3-6	Meath
P. Moriarty (0-7), P. J. McIntyre (1-3), B. Twomey (1-0), John Martin Brick (0-2), John Michael Brick (0-1), J. Bunyan (0-1).		M. Martin (2-0), T. J. Reilly (1-0), S. Kearney (0-3), J. Doherty (0-1), B. Aylward (0-1), E. Priest (0-1).

Croke Park, Dublin
Referee: T. Furlong (Dublin)

=== Home final ===
May 25
Home Final

Westmeath	2-13 – 1-12	Kerry
C. Connaughton (0-8), M. Flanagan (1-1), N. Fitzsimons (1-0), P. Curran (0-1), M. Kilcoyne (0-1), M. Fagan (0-1), M. Cosgrave (0-1).		C. Nolan (1-1), P. Moriarty (0-4), P. J. McIntyre (0-3), John Michael Brick (0-2), T. Nolan (0-2).

Gaelic Grounds, Limerick
Referee: S. O'Meara (Tipperary)

=== Final ===
June 15
Final

Westmeath	4-16 – 3-19	London
M. Flanagan (3-2), C. Connaughton (1-1), M. Kilcoyne (0-3), M. Fagan (0-1), S. Keary (0-1), M. Cosgrave (0-1), P. Curran (0-1).		K. Gantley (1-7), M. Linnane (1-2), S. Collins (1-2), H. Cashin (0-4), L. Corless (0-2), P. O'Neill (0-2).

Croke Park, Dublin
Referee: P. Robinson (Galway)

June 22
Final Replay

Westmeath	3-23 – 2-7	London
C. Connaughton (1-6), E. Fagan (1-3), J. Keary (0-5), N. Fitzsimons (1-1), M. Kilcoyne (0-3), M. Flanagan (0-2), W. Shanley (0-1), G. Whelan (0-1), P. Curran (0-1).		P. O'Neill (1-3), M. Linnane (1-0), E. Gantley (0-3), M. Hughes (0-1).

Croke Park, Dublin
Referee: P. Robinson (Galway)

== Championship statistics ==
=== Scoring ===
- Widest winning margin: 19 points
  - Westmeath 3-23 : 2-7 London (All-Ireland final replay)
- Most goals in a match: 7
  - Westmeath 4-16 : 3-19 London (All-Ireland final)
- Most points in a match: 39
  - Westmeath 2-22 : 2-17 Antrim (All-Ireland semi-final)
- Most goals by one team in a match: 4
  - Westmeath 4-16 : 3-19 London (All-Ireland final)
- Most goals scored by a losing team: 3
  - Meath 3-6 : 2-14 Kerry (All-Ireland semi-final)
- Most points scored by a losing team: 17
  - Antrim 2-17 : 2-22 Westmeath (All-Ireland semi-final)

=== Overall ===
- Most goals scored - Westmeath (14)
- Fewest goals scored - Carlow (0)
- Most goals conceded - Westmeath (9)
- Most points scored - Westmeath (83)
- Fewest points scored - Roscommon (2)
- Most points conceded - Westmeath (61)

== Top scorers ==
=== Season ===
Rank	Player	County	Tally	Total	Matches	Average
1	Colm Connaughton	Westmeath	4-24	37	5	7.40
2	Mick Flanagan	Westmeath	5-5	20	5	4.00
3	Mick Fagan	Westmeath	1-15	18	5	3.60

=== Single game ===
Rank	Player	County	Tally	Total	Opposition
1	Eddie Donnelly	Antrim	1-10	13	Westmeath
2	Mick Flanagan	Westmeath	3-2	11	London
2	Colm Connaughton	Westmeath	1-8	11	Antrim
4	K Gantley	London	1-7	10	Westmeath
5	Colm Connaughton	Westmeath	1-6	9	London
6	Charlie McDonnell	Antrim	2-2	8	Wicklow
6	John Martin BRick	Kerry	1-5	8	Roscommon
6	Mick Fagan	Westmeath	1-5	8	Down
6	Mick Fagan	Westmeath	0-8	8	Antrim
6	Colm Connaughton	Westmeath	0-8	8	Kerry
