= Michael Walsh (Kilkenny hurler) =

Irish hurler

Personal information
- Native name: Mícheál Breathnach (Irish)
- Nickname: Mickey
- Born: 13 October 1961 (age 65) Kilkenny, Ireland
- Height: 5 ft 8 in (173 cm)

Sport
- Sport: Hurling
- Position: Goalkeeper
Club
- Years: Club
- Dicksboro
Club titles
- Kilkenny titles: 1
Inter-county
Years	County	Apps (scores)
1984-1996	Kilkenny	19 (0-00)
Inter-county titles
- Leinster titles: 3
- All-Irelands: 2
- NHL: 1
- All Stars: 2

Michael Walsh (born 13 October 1961) is an Irish retired hurler who played as a goalkeeper for the Kilkenny senior team and played soccer for Kilkenny City A.F.C. at schoolboy, youth, junior and senior level, as well as lining out for the Republic of Ireland youth team.

Walsh made his first appearance for the team during the mid-1980s, however, he didn't become first-choice goalkeeper until the 1990-91 National League and was a regular member of the team until his retirement after the 1996 championship. During that time he has won two All-Ireland winners' medals, three Leinster winners' medals, one National League winners' medal and two All-Star awards.

At club level Walsh was a one-time county championship medalist with Dicksboro.

Walsh is the son of Ollie Walsh, regarded by many as one of the greatest hurling goalkeepers of all-time.

== Playing career ==
=== Club ===
Walsh played his club hurling with the Dicksboro club and enjoyed some success during a lengthy career.

In 1991 Walsh tasted his first major success with the club. A 4-9 to 2-8 defeat of Young Irelands gave him a county intermediate championship medal.

Two years later Walsh added a county senior championship medal to his collection following a victory over Fenians in a replay of the county decider.

=== Inter-county ===
Walsh first came to prominence on the inter-county scene as a member of the Kilkenny minor team in the late seventies. He won a Leinster medal in this grade in 1979, however, Kilkenny were later defeated by Cork in the All-Ireland decider.

He immediately moved onto the Kilkenny under-21. He won back-to-back Leinster medals in 1980 and 1981, however, there would be no All-Ireland success either in this grade as Tipperary dominated the championship.

In 1984 Walsh made his first appearance for the Kilkenny senior team when he lined out in the Oireachtas Tournament. He collected a winners' medal from that competition, playing as wing-forward.

Walsh later made several appearances during various National League campaigns but failed to command a regular place on the starting fifteen.

In spite of failing to make it as a member of the Kilkenny senior team, Walsh quickly became a regular on the Kilkenny junior hurling team. In 1986, he won a Leinster medal in this grade before later winning an All-Ireland medal following a five-point defeat of Limerick.

Four years later in 1990 Walsh captured his second Leinster junior medal. He later collected his second All-Ireland junior medal following a 4-21 to 2-11 thrashing of old rivals Tipperary.

In late 1990 Walsh's father, Ollie, was appointed manager of the Kilkenny senior hurling team. He gave his son a chance to play in that year's National Hurling League, and Walsh Jr. later became the first-choice goalkeeper on the senior team. In spite of some criticism of nepotism Walsh went on to have a very successful career at senior level.

Later in 1991 Walsh won his first senior Leinster title with Kilkenny, however, his side were beaten by Tipperary in the All-Ireland final. In spite of this he was still presented with an All-Star award for his great display in the championship.

In 1992 Walsh won his second Leinster title before later claiming his first senior All-Ireland medal following a win over Cork. The following year he captured his third consecutive Leinster title before making his third consecutive appearance in an All-Ireland final. In the final Kilkenny beat Galway by 2-17 to 1-15 and Walsh collected his second All-Ireland medal. He finished off the year by also winning a second All-Star. Over the next few years Offaly emerged as the dominant team in Leinster as Kilkenny began to slide. Walsh did win a National Hurling League medal in 1995, however, there was no more championship success.

In March 1996 Walsh's father died. This was a major blow for Walsh as his father had been a huge influence on his career. He continued to play but he retired following Kilkenny's defeat to Wexford in the Leinster quarter-final.

== Soccer ==
Walsh, along with his two brothers Billy and Ollie, also played soccer for Kilkenny City A.F.C. at schoolboy, youth, junior and senior level. In the early 1980s Walsh also received offers from both Waterford United and St. Patrick's Athletic. He also captained the Republic of Ireland at youth level. He later served Kilkenny City A.F.C. as their schoolboys general manager and at one stage ran 20 teams.

=== Post-playing career ===
In retirement from playing Walsh has maintained a keen interest in the game. In 2001, he became manager of the Carlow senior hurling team, however, he had little success there. Walsh is a hurling analyst for KCLR Radio and has recently been appointed Kilkenny Under 21 manager for 2008.

Sporting positions
Preceded by Eddie O'Connor	Kilkenny Senior Hurling Captain; 1994	Succeeded by Bill Hennessy
Preceded by Eddie Byrne	Carlow Senior Hurling Manager; 2001-2004	Succeeded by Eoin Garvey
Achievements
Preceded by Vincent Mullins (Galway)	All-Ireland Under-21 Hurling Final winning manager 2008	Succeeded by John Minogue (Clare)

== Sources ==
- Christy O'Connor, Last Man Standing: Hurling Goalkeepers, (O'Brien Press, 2005)
