= 1981 All-Ireland Senior B Hurling Championship =

Tournament details
- Country: Ireland; England

Final positions
- Champions: Antrim
- Runner-up: London

The 1981 All-Ireland Senior B Hurling Championship was the eighth staging of Ireland's secondary hurling knock-out competition. Antrim won the championship, beating London 3–17 to 3–14 in the final at Fr. Healy Park, Loughguile.

== Results ==
=== All-Ireland Senior B Hurling Championship ===
First round
Down	5-06, 5-11
Meath	1-04, 0-03

Quarterfinals
Down	1-10
Kildare	0-17
Armagh	0-08
Antrim	4-18
Roscommon	3-08
Kerry	3-14
Wicklow	3-11
Carlow	2-16

Semifinals
Kildare	0-14
Antrim	2-15
Kerry	3-21
Carlow	1-15

Final
Antrim	1-07, 4-17
Kerry	0-10, 1-09

First round

10 May 1981 First round	Down	5-6 - 1-4	Meath	McKenna Park, Ballycran
	H Gilmore 2-3, K Doherty 2-0, W McAvera 1-0, Gerrard Lennon 0-2, P Braniff 0-1.		B O'Neill 0-4, F McCann 1-0.	Referee: A Thompson (Antrim)

17 May 1981 First round refixture	Down	5-11 - 0-3	Meath	McKenna Park, Ballycran
	W Coulter 4-0, H Gilmore 0-6, C Doherty 1-0, J Hughes 0-1, G Coulter 0-1, W McAvera 0-1, P Hughes 0-1, B Bell 0-1.		S Ryan 0-1, F McCann 0-1, J Reilly 0-1.	Referee: A Thompson (Antrim)

17 May 1981 First round	Roscommon	3-8 - 3-14	Kerry	Athleague GAA Grounds
	A Flaherty 2-1, P Dolan 1-4, H Crowley 0-3.		J Bunyan 0-8, T Nolan 2-1, F Bowler 1-1, J Regan 0-2, C Nolan 0-1, J Kelly 0-1.

17 May 1981 First round	Wicklow	3-11 - 2-16	Carlow	Aughrim Park, Aughrim

17 May 1981 First round	Armagh	0-8 - 4-18	Antrim	Garard McGleenan Park, Keady

Quarter-final

24 May 1981 Quarter-final	Down	1-10 - 0-17	Kildare	McKenna Park, Ballycran
	H Gilmore 1-2, B Mullan 0-4, W Coulter 0-2, B Braniff 0-1, C O'Flynn 0-1.		J Walsh 0-6, M Murphy 0-2, M Burns 0-2, N Walsh 0-2, T White 0-2, M Moore 0-1, T O'Connor 0-1, P White 0-1.

Semi-finals

31 May 1981 Semi-final	Antrim	2-15 - 0-14	Kildare	Croke Park, Dublin
	D Donnelly 2-1, P Boyle 0-7, P McFaul 0-2, E Donnelly 0-2, D McNaughton 0-2, B Donnelly 0-1.		J Walsh 0-6, G Deering 0-2, M Moore 0-2, N Walsh 0-2, M Burns 0-1, J O'Connell 0-1.	Referee: N O'Donoghue (Dublin)

31 May 1981 Semi-final	Kerry	3-21 - 1-15	Carlow	Canon Hayes Park, Bansha
	L O'Mahony 2-5, F Bowler 1-3, M O'Sullivan 0-4, P Nolan 0-3, B Nolan 0-3, J Bunyan 0-2, PJ Holohan 0-1.		P Quirke 0-7, W Cullen 1-2, P Cassells 0-2, M Murphy 0-2, E Quirke 0-1, J Kavanagh 0-1.	Referee: M Kelleher (Kildare)

Home final

14 June 1981 Home final	Antrim	1-7 - 0-10	Kerry	Croke Park, Dublin
	B Donnelly 1-1, D McNaughton 0-2, E Donnelly 0-2, P Boyle 0-1, S Donnelly 0-1.		B Neenan 0-4, J Bunyan 0-2, T Nolan 0-1, F Bowler 0-1, P Moriarty 0-1, J Kelly 0-1.	Referee: N O'Donoghue (Dublin)

21 June 1981 Home final replay	Antrim	4-17 - 1-9	Kerry	Parnell Park, Dublin
	D Donnelly 2-2, E Donnelly 2-1, P McFaul 0-3, S Collins 0-3, J Crossey 0-3, P Boyle 0-2, D McNaughton 0-2, B Donnelly 0-1.		C Nolan 1-2, J Bunyan 0-4, L O'Mahony 0-1, P Moriarty 0-1, B Neenan 0-1.	Referee: C Foley (Dublin)

Final

5 July 1981 Final	Antrim	3-17 - 3-14	London	Fr. Healy Park, Loughguile
	B Donnelly 1-3, J Crossey 1-2, P Boyle 0-4, B Laverty 1-0, D Donnelly 0-3, P McFaul 0-2, M O'Connell 0-2, G Cunningham 0-1.		T Taylor 2-3, M Hughes 1-0, M Burke 0-8, J Cormack 0-2, M Linnane 0-1.	Referee: N O'Donoghue (Dublin)
