= 2003 All-Ireland Senior B Hurling Championship =

Tournament details
- Country: Ireland; England

Final positions
- Champions: Wicklow
- Runner-up: Roscommon

The 2003 All-Ireland Senior B Hurling Championship was the 25th staging of Ireland's secondary hurling knock-out competition. Wicklow won the championship, beating Roscommon 4–16 to 2–13 in the final at Croke Park, Dublin.

== Sources ==
- Donegan, Des, The Complete Handbook of Gaelic Games (DBA Publications Limited, 2005).
