= 1978 All-Ireland Senior B Hurling Championship =

Tournament details
- Country: Ireland; England

Final positions
- Champions: Antrim
- Runners-up: London

The 1978 All-Ireland Senior B Hurling Championship was the fifth staging of Ireland's secondary hurling knock-out competition. Antrim won the championship, defeating London 1–16 to 3–7 in the final at Croke Park, Dublin.

== The championship ==
=== Format ===
Home final: (1 match) The winners of the two semi-finals contest this game. One team is eliminated at this stage while the winners advance to the 'proper' All-Ireland final.

Final: (1 match) The winners of the All-Ireland 'home' final join London to contest this game. One team is eliminated at this stage while the winners are allowed to participate in the All-Ireland SHC quarter-final.

== Results ==
=== Semi-finals ===
28 May 1978 Semi-final	Antrim	2-17 - 2-7	Roscommon	Croke Park

28 May 1978 Semi-final	Down	5-15 - 3-11	Meath	Croke Park

=== Home final ===
11 June 1978 Home final	Antrim	1-10 - 2-6	Down	Corrigan Park
	R McDonnell 1-4, J Crossey 0-3, J O'Neill 0-1, C Ward 0-1, S McNaughton 0-1.		B Gilmore 1-2, P Braniff 1-0, B Mullin 0-1, M O'Flynn 0-1.

=== Final ===
25 June 1078 Final	Antrim	1-16 - 3-7	London	Croke Park
	R McDonnell 0-4, D McNaughton 0-3, P Boyle 0-3, J Crossey 0-2, J Fagan 0-2, C Ward 1-0, S Collins 0-1, P McEllistrim 0-1.		M Hughes 2-2, J McCormack 1-2, P Cronin 0-2, D Law 0-1.	Referee: M Slattery (Clare)
