= 1989 All-Ireland Senior B Hurling Championship =

Tournament details
- Country: Ireland; England

Final positions
- Champions: Kildare
- Runner-up: London

The 1989 All-Ireland Senior B Hurling Championship was the 16th staging of Ireland's secondary hurling knock-out competition. Kildare won the championship, beating London 1–13 to 1–12 in the final at St. Conleth's Park, Newbridge.
