= 1988 All-Ireland Senior B Hurling Championship =

Tournament details
- Country: Ireland; England

Final positions
- Champions: London
- Runner-up: Down

The 1988 All-Ireland Senior B Hurling Championship was the 15th staging of Ireland's secondary hurling knock-out competition. London won the championship, beating Down 2–6 to 1–7 in the final at the Emerald GAA Grounds, Ruislip.
