= 1985 All-Ireland Senior B Hurling Championship =

Tournament details
- Country: Ireland; England

Final positions
- Champions: London
- Runner-up: Meath

The 1985 All-Ireland Senior B Hurling Championship was the 12th staging of Ireland's secondary hurling knock-out competition. London won the championship, beating Meath 1–8 to 1–6 in the final at St. Loman's Park, Trim.
