= 1979 All-Ireland Senior B Hurling Championship =

Tournament details
- Country: Ireland; England
- Teams: 8

Final positions
- Champions: Laois
- Runner-up: London

Tournament statistics
- Matches played: 8

The 1979 All-Ireland Senior Hurling Championship was the sixth series of the All-Ireland Senior B Hurling Championship, Ireland's secondary hurling knock-out competition. Laois won the championship, beating London 1–20 to 0–17 in a replay of the final at Geraldine Park, Athy.

== Results ==
=== All-Ireland Senior B Hurling Championship ===
May 13
Quarter-final

Westmeath	0-13 – 2-11	Antrim

Cusack Park, Mullingar

May 13
Quarter-final

Laois	2-16 – 1-7	Wicklow

Kelly O'Daly Park, Rathdowney

May 13
Quarter-final

Kerry	0-15 – 0-10	Roscommon

Croke Park, Dublin

May 27
Semi-final

Laois	2-14 – 3-6	Kerry

Fr. Hayes Memorial Park, Caherconlish

May 27
Semi-final

Kildare	2-12 – 1-12	Antrim

Croke Park, Dublin

June 3
Home final

Laois	3-16 – 2-8	Kildare

Páirc Tailteann, Navan

June 17
Final

Laois	2-13 – 3-10	London

O'Connor Park, Tullamore

June 24
Final replay

Laois	1-20 – 0-17	London

Geraldine Park, Athy

== Sources ==
- Donegan, Des, The Complete Handbook of Gaelic Games (DBA Publications Limited, 2005).
