= 1996 All-Ireland Senior B Hurling Championship =

Tournament details
- Country: Ireland; England

Final positions
- Champions: Derry
- Runner-up: Wicklow

The 1996 All-Ireland Senior B Hurling Championship was the 23rd staging of Ireland's secondary hurling knock-out competition. Derry won the championship, beating Wicklow 1-14 to 0-10 in the final at Croke Park, Dublin.
