= 1983 All-Ireland Senior B Hurling Championship =

- Dates: 1 May – 26 June 1983
- Teams: 8
- Champions: Kerry (2nd title); John O'Regan (captain)
- Runners-up: London

Tournament statistics
- Matches played: 8
- Goals scored: 33 (4.13 per match)
- Points scored: 148 (18.5 per match)

The 1983 All-Ireland Senior B Hurling Championship was the tenth staging of Ireland's secondary hurling knock-out competition. Kerry won the championship, beating London 2–8 to 1–7 in the final at Austin Stack Park, Tralee.

== Results ==
=== All-Ireland quarter-finals ===
1 May 1983 Quarter-final	Down	3-09 - 1-05	Roscommon	McKenna Park
	G Lennon 1-2, C O'Flynn 1-1, P McMullen 1-0, P Braniff 0-1, P Savage 0-1, S Rooney 0-1, G Clarke 0-1, W McAvera 0-1, P Dorrian 0-1.		G Keenan 1-0, P Dolan 0-3, S Kilroy 0-2.

1 May 1983 Quarter-final	Wicklow	3-05 - 1-09	Kildare	Kilcoole Grounds
	J Reilly 1-1, G Byrne 1-0, N Cremin 1-0, P Doyle 0-2, P Berkery 0-1, T Kelly 0-1.		J Walsh 0-7, N Walsh 1-1, N Donoghue 0-1.

1 May 1983 Quarter-final	Carlow	1-13 - 3-09	Meath	Dr Cullen Park
	M Murphy 1-9, P Hickey 0-2, C Hughes 0-2.		F McCann 1-4, G Hynes 1-0, B Tansey 1-0, P Kelly 0-2, M Smith 0-1, F Lynch 0-1, J Connolly 0-1.

1 May 1983 Quarter-final	Mayo	1-06 - 5-09	Kerry	MacHale Park
	K Power 1-0, J Cunnane 0-3, J Henry 0-2, M Trench 0-1.		F O'Donovan 3-1, T Nolan 1-1, J O'Regan 1-1, B Neenan 0-3, J O'Connell 0-1, J O'Carroll 0-1, J Hennessy 0-1.

=== All-Ireland semi-finals ===
15 May 1983 Semi-final	Down	2-10 - 0-13	Meath	Páirc an Chuinnigh
	B Gilmore 2-3, H Gilmore 0-4, C O'Flynn 0-1, P Coulter 0-1, P Branniff 0-1.		F McCann 0-8, G Hynes 0-4, M Smith 0-1.	Referee: C Foley (Dublin)

15 May 1983 Semi-final	Kerry	3-09 - 2-07	Wicklow	MacDonagh Park
	T Nolan 1-2, P Stack 1-1, DJ Leahy 1-0, J Martin 0-3, J O'Regan 0-3.		T Berkery 2-2, J Reilly 0-2, B Reilly 0-1, S Keogh 0-1, H Keaveney 0-1.

=== All-Ireland home final ===
29 May 1983 Home final	Kerry	3-16 - 2-13	Down	Croke Park
	J Hennessy 0-10, P Stack 2-3, L O'Mahony 1-0, T Nolan 0-2, J O'Regan 0-1.		B Gilmore 0-7, K O'Neill 1-1, P Savage 1-0, E Sheehan 0-2, H Gilmore 0-1, C O'Flynn 0-1, P McMullan 0-1.	Referee: C Foley (Dublin)

=== All-Ireland final ===
26 June 1983 Final	Kerry	2-08 - 1-07	London	Austin Stack Park
	JM Brick 1-3, P Stack 0-4, J O'Regan 1-0, J O'Connell 0-1.		P Quinlan 1-1, J Roche 0-3, J Murphy 0-2, M Connors 0-1.	Referee: K Walsh (Limerick)
