= 1986 All-Ireland Senior B Hurling Championship =

Tournament details
- Country: Ireland; England

Final positions
- Champions: Kerry
- Runner-up: London

The 1986 All-Ireland Senior B Hurling Championship was the 13th staging of Ireland's secondary hurling knock-out competition. Kerry won the championship, beating London 3–11 to 1–10 in the final at the Emerald GAA Grounds, Ruislip.
