= 1982 All-Ireland Senior B Hurling Championship =

Tournament details
- Country: Ireland; England

Final positions
- Champions: Antrim
- Runner-up: London

The 1982 All-Ireland Senior B Hurling Championship was the ninth staging of Ireland's secondary hurling knock-out competition. Antrim won the championship, beating London 2–16 to 2–14 in the final at the Emerald GAA Grounds, Ruislip.
