= 1974 All-Ireland Senior B Hurling Championship =

Tournament details
- Dates: 12 May 1974 - 23 June 1974
- Teams: 9

Final positions
- Champions: Kildare (1st title)
- Runners-up: Antrim

Tournament statistics
- Matches played: 9

The 1974 All-Ireland Senior B Hurling Championship was the first staging of the All-Ireland Senior B Hurling Championship, the Gaelic Athletic Association's secondary inter-county hurling tournament. The championship began on 12 May 1974 and ended on 23 June 1974.

On 23 June 1974, Kildare won the championship following a 1–26 to 3–13 defeat of Antrim in the All-Ireland final. This was their fourth All-Ireland title in hurling, following on from earlier successes in the intermediate and junior grades. The prize for the winners was a place in the All-Ireland Senior Hurling Championship.

Kildare's Johnny Walsh was the championship's top scorer with 0-20.

== Teams ==
=== General information ===
Nine counties will compete in the championship:

County	Last Provincial Title	Last All-Ireland Title	Appearance
Antrim	1949	—	1st
Down	1942	—	1st
Carlow	—	—	1st
Hertfordshire	—	—	1st
Kerry	1891	1891	1st
Kildare	—	—	1st
Meath	—	—	1st
Westmeath	—	—	1st
Wicklow	—	—	1st

Leinster	Munster	Ulster	Britain
Carlow; Kildare; Meath; Westmeath; Wicklow	Kerry	Antrim; Down	Hertfordshire

== Format ==
First round: (4 matches) These are four matches between the eight native participating teams. Four teams are eliminated at this stage. Two winning teams automatically qualify for the semi-final stage. Two other winning teams play off in a lone quarter-final.

Quarter-final: (1 match) This is a single match between two first round winners. One team is eliminated at this stage while the winners advance to the semi-final.

Semi-finals: (2 matches) The two winners of the first round join the winners of the lone quarter-final and British representatives Hertfordshire to make up the semi-final pairings. Two teams are eliminated at this stage while the winners advance to the final.

Final: (1 match) The winners of the two semi-finals contest this game. One team is eliminated at this stage while the winners are allowed to participate in a preliminary round for the All-Ireland Senior Hurling Championship.

== All-Ireland Senior B Hurling Championship ==
=== First round ===
May 12
First Round

Down	2-6 – 2-7	Westmeath
B. Gilmore (1-3), C. O'Flynn (1-1), J. Hughes (0-1), M. O'Flynn (0-1).		E. Clarke (0-5), M. Fagan (1-0), N. Fitzsimons (1-0), P. Curran (0-2).

McKenna Park, Ballycran

May 12
First Round

Wicklow	1-4 – 2-5	Antrim
T. McCarthy (1-0), M. Lalor (0-2), M. Jordan (0-1), S. O'Brien (0-1).		E. Donnelly (2-1), A. Hamill (0-1), B. Patterson (0-1), A. McCallin (0-1), S. Collins (0-1).

Aughrim County Ground, Aughrim
Referee: B. Lowth (Dublin)

May 12
First Round

Meath	3-10 – 2-9	Carlow
R. Melia (1-4), V. Guy (1-0), T. J. O'Reilly (1-0), S. Kearney (0-3), Cyril Maguire (0-2), F. McCann (0-1).		P. Quirke (0-7), T. Byrne (1-0), P. Keogh (1-0), T. Collier (0-1), P. McNally (0-1).

St. Loman's Park, Trim
Referee: S. Harkin (Laois)

May 12
First Round

Kerry	1-9 – 3-4	Kildare
P. Moriarty (1-0), J. McGrath (0-4), T. Kenny (0-3), P. Nolan (0-2).		J. O'Connell (1-2), N. Walshe (1-1), F. Deering (1-0), J. Walshe (0-1).

Austin Stack Park, Tralee
Referee: M. Slattery (Clare)

=== Quarter-finals ===
May 26
Quarter-Final

Kildare	3-18 – 2-8	Meath
M. Deely (2-2), J. Walshe (0-6), F. Deering (0-4), M. Dunne (1-0), T. Carew (0-2), N. Walshe (0-2), B. Burke (0-1), J. Wall (0-1).		P. J. O'Reilly (1-1), N. O'Riordan (1-0), V. Guy (0-2), R. Melia (0-2), C. Maguire (0-1), G. Geoghegan (0-1), S. Kearney (0-1).

St. Conleth's Park, Newbridge

=== Semi-finals ===
June 2
Semi-Final

Kildare	2-10 – 1-8	Westmeath
N. Walshe (1-3), J. Wall (1-0), J. Walshe (0-3), M. Deely (0-2), B. Burke (0-1), T. Carew (0-1).		J. Carey (1-1), C. Connaughton (0-4), P. Curran (0-3).

St. Conleth's Park, Newbridge
Referee: B. Lowth (Dublin)

June 9
Semi-Final

Antrim	4-9 – 4-9	Hertfordshire
W. Richmond (2-0), E. Dornan (1-3), S. Richmond (1-1), E. Donnelly (0-2), A. Hamill (0-2), R. McDonnell (0-1).		M. Cuddy (2-1), P. Carr (1-1), M. Alan (1-0), E. Purcell (0-3), S. McGarry (0-2), J. Cuddy (0-1), G. Mahoney (0-1).

Casement Park, Belfast
Referee: C. Foley (Dublin)

June 16
Semi-Final Replay

Hertfordshire	4-13 – 5-15	Antrim
J. Cuddy (1-4), H. Healy (2-2), M. Cuddy (0-5), S. McGarry (1-0), P. Carr (0-1), M. Waters (0-1).		S. Richmond (3-1), E. Donnelly (1-2), A. Hamill (0-4), I. Lewsley (1-0), W. Richmond (0-3), S. Collins (0-2), M. McKillop (0-2), R. McDonnell (0-1).

Sundon Park, Luton
Referee: P. Byrne (Limerick)

=== Final ===
June 23
Final

Kildare	1-26 – 3-13	Antrim
J. Walshe (0-10), B. Burke (0-5), M. Deely (0-4), N. Walshe (1-0), T. Carew (0-3), J. O'Leary (0-2), J. O'Connell (0-1), A. Moore (0-1).		W. Richmond (2-1), S. Collins (0-5), E. Donnelly (0-5), A. Hamill (1-1), S. Richmond (0-1).

Croke Park, Dublin
Referee: B. Lowth (Dublin)

== Championship statistics ==
=== Scoring ===
- Widest winning margin: 13 points
  - Kildare 3-18 : 2-8 Meath (All-Ireland quarter-final)
- Most goals in a match: 9
  - Hertfordshire 4-13 : 5-15 Antrim (All-Ireland semi-final replay)
- Most points in a match: 39
  - Kildare 1-26 : 3-13 Antrim (All-Ireland final)
- Most goals by one team in a match: 5
  - Antrim 5-15 : 4-13 Hertfordshire (All-Ireland semi-final replay)
- Most goals scored by a losing team: 4
  - Hertfordshire 4-13 : 5-15 Antrim (All-Ireland semi-final replay)
- Most points scored by a losing team: 13
  - Hertfordshire 4-13 : 5-15 Antrim (All-Ireland semi-final replay)
  - Antrim 3-13 : 1-26 Kildare (All-Ireland final)

=== Overall ===
- Most goals scored - Antrim (14)
- Fewest goals scored - Wicklow, Kerry (0)
- Most goals conceded - Antrim (9)
- Most points scored - Kildare (58)
- Fewest points scored - Wicklow (4)
- Most points conceded - Antrim (52)

== Top scorers ==
=== Season ===
Rank	Player	County	Tally	Total	Matches	Average
1	Johnny Walsh	Kildare	0-20	20	4	5.00
2	Eddie Donnelly	Antrim	3-10	19	4	4.75
3	Willie Richmond	Kildare	4-4	16	4	4.00
4	Séamus Richmond	Antrim	4-3	15	4	3.75
4	Ned Walsh	Kildare	3-6	15	4	3.75
6	Mick Deely	Kildare	2-8	14	4	3.50
7	Martin Cuddy	Hertfordshire	2-6	12	2	6.00

=== Single game ===
Rank	Player	County	Tally	Total	Opposition
1	Séamus Richmond	Antrim	3-1	10	Hertfordshire
1	Johnny Walsh	Kildare	0-10	10	Antrim
3	Mick Deely	Kildare	2-2	8	Meath
4	Willie Richmond	Antrim	2-1	7	Kildare
4	Martin Cuddy	Hertfordshire	2-1	7	Antrim
4	Eddie Donnelly	Antrim	2-1	7	Wicklow
4	Richie Melia	Meath	1-4	7	Carlow
4	John Cuddy	Hertfordshire	1-4	7	Antrim
4	Pat Quirke	Carlow	0-7	7	Meath
10	Willie Richmond	Antrim	2-0	6	Hertfordshire
10	Brian Gilmore	Down	1-3	6	Westmeath
10	Ned Walsh	Kildare	1-3	6	Westmeath
10	Eddie Dornan	Antrim	1-3	6	Hertfordshire
10	Johnny Walshe	Kildare	0-6	6	Meath

== See also ==
- 1974 All-Ireland Senior Hurling Championship

== Sources ==
- Donegan, Des, The Complete Handbook of Gaelic Games (DBA Publications Limited, 2005).
