= Austin Stack Park =

Irish sports stadium

- Páirc Aibhistin de Staic; The Sportsfield
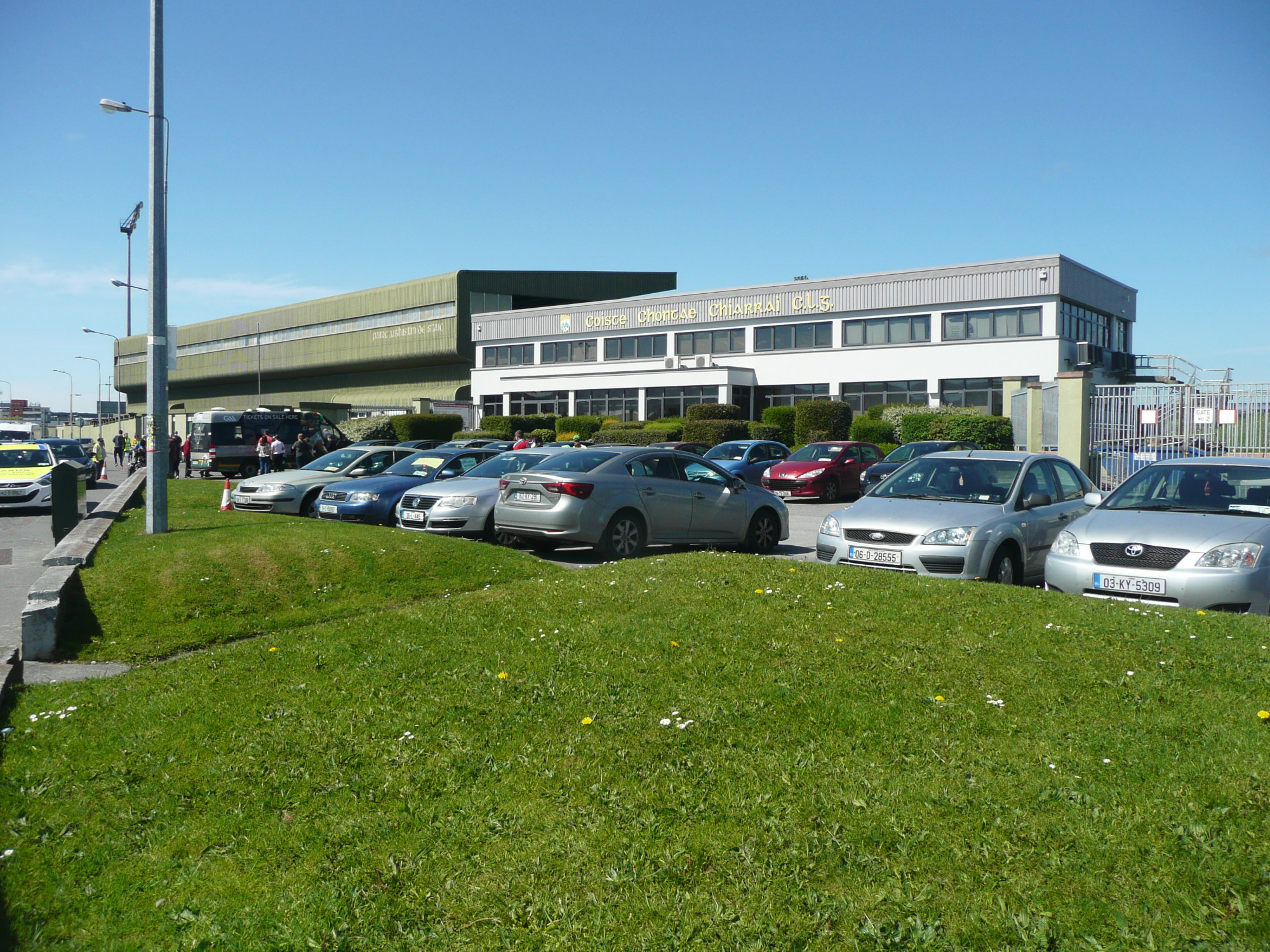
- Interactive map of Austin Stack Park
- Location: Tralee, County Kerry, Ireland
- Coordinates: 52°16′09.51″N 9°41′38.37″W
- Owner: Kerry GAA
- Capacity: 14,000
- Public transit: Tralee railway station

Construction
- Renovated: 1994, 2001, 2015, 2026

Austin Stack Park is a GAA stadium in Tralee, County Kerry, Ireland. It is one of the stadiums used by Kerry GAA's Gaelic football team and the stadium of the hurling team.

The ground was named after Austin Stack, an Irish revolutionary and captain of the All-Ireland winning Kerry Gaelic football team of 1904. It is located in the centre of Tralee. It hosts many Kerry GAA home games, mostly football league games and both league and championship hurling. The County Championship football and hurling finals are normally held here.

== History ==
Austin Stack Park has been used for the playing of games since well into the 19th century. Generally known as The Sportsfield, it was owned by the County Kerry Athletic and Cricket Club. At that time the pitch was oval shaped and surrounded by a 440-yard sloping cinder track considered to be the finest in Ireland.

In 1903, the trustees rented the ground to a committee consisting of all GAA members. The Kerry County Board then purchased the grounds in 1929.

In 1934, The Sportsfield was converted into a rectangular pitch to host the 1934 All-Ireland Senior Football Championship Semi Final which led to the demise of the cinder track. In 1944, the County Board renamed the grounds in honour of Austin Stack.

The Kerry County Board have had their offices in the ground since 1985 located in the pavilion which first opened back in 1967. In 1994, a new development was completed including a new stand, terracing and redeveloped County Board offices.

The stadium hosted the All-Ireland Senior B Hurling Championship final in 1983 when Kerry took the title beating London in the final. It also hosted the 1997-98 Sigerson Cup final which was won by Tralee IT, while the first game in Kerry GAA played under floodlights took place here in November 2001.

== Recent developments ==
In 2007, plans were approved for the stadium's relocation to a site, outside the town, occupied by Ballybeggan Racecourse. In December 2009 it was announced that plans for this development had been put on indefinite hold due to the post-2008 Irish economic downturn. By 2012 The Kerryman newspaper reported that the plans had, in effect, been abandoned.

In 2014, a committee was put in place by the Kerry County Board to look into the gradual refurbishment of the existing grounds. These proposals included the upgrading of the pitch, a new score board, upgrading of the lighting system and terracing of the western side of the grounds. A number of these developments, including resurfacing and drainage works on the pitch, were undertaken in 2015 and 2016.

Further upgrading works were carried out in 2026 with the construction of a new concrete terrace to replace the existing grass bank at the Horan's end. The construction of the new terrace cost €1.8m and increased spectator capacity by 2,500.

== See also ==
- List of Gaelic Athletic Association stadiums
- List of stadiums in Ireland by capacity
