= 2018 Kerry Senior Hurling Championship =

Annual hurling competition season

- Dates: 16 June – 26 August 2018
- Teams: 8
- Sponsor: Garvey's SuperValu
- Champions: Lixnaw (8th title); Darragh Shanahan (captain); Fergus Fitzmaurice (manager)
- Runners-up: Kilmoyley; Daniel Collins (captain); John Meyler (manager)

Tournament statistics
- Matches played: 13
- Goals scored: 24 (1.85 per match)
- Points scored: 379 (29.15 per match)
- Top scorer(s): Shane Conway (1-58)

The 2018 Kerry Senior Hurling Championship was the 117th staging of the Kerry Senior Hurling Championship since its establishment by the Kerry County Board in 1889. The draw for the opening round fixtures took place on 30 May 2018. The championship ran from 16 June to 26 August 2018.

Ballyduff were the defending champions, however, they were beaten by Kilmoyley in the semi-finals.

The final was played on 26 August 2018 at Austin Stack Park in Tralee, between Lixnaw and Kilmoyley, in what was their first meeting in the final in four years. Lixnaw won the match by 1–12 to 0–12 to claim their ninth championship title overall and a first title in four years.

Lixnaw's Shane Conway was the championship's top scorer with 1-58.

== Results ==
=== Round 1 ===
16 June 2018 Round 1	Lixnaw	0-16 - 1-12	Kilmoyley	Austin Stack Park
	S Conway 0-12, R Heffernan 0-2, S McElligott 0-1, C Sheehy 0-1.		D Collins 1-9, J Brick 0-3.

16 June 2018 Round 1	Ballyduff	4-19 - 3-07	Abbeydorney	Austin Stack Park
	P Boyle 0-10, A Boyle 3-0, J Goulding 1-5, D O'Carroll 0-1, P O'Carroll 0-1, J Hussey 0-1, M Boyle 0-1.		E Egan 1-1, PJ Keane 1-0, N Roche 1-0, M Slattery 0-3, J O'Connor 0-1, S O'Sullivan 0-1, B O'Leary 0-1.

17 June 2018 Round 1	Ballyheigue	1-09 - 1-15	Crotta O'Neill's	Austin Stack Park
	P Lucid 1-5, D Walsh 0-2, R Kenny 0-1, K Reidy 0-1.		S Nolan 0-10, J Conway 1-1, B Mahony 0-2, R Nolan 0-1, D Kennelly 0-1.

17 June 2018 Round 1	Causeway	0-19 - 0-15	St Brendan's	Austin Stack Park
	B Barrett 0-10, J Leahy 0-4, B Murphy 0-2, J Diggins 0-1, A Fealy 0-1, S Murphy 0-1.		J Egan 0-7, D Griffin 0-3, B O'Connor 0-2, E Leen 0-1, D Finnegan 0-1, F Mackessey 0-1.

=== Round 2A ===
30 June 2018 Round 2A	Crotta O'Neill's	0-16 - 2-13	Ballyduff	Austin Stack Park
	S Nolan 0-11, J Conway 0-3, B Mahony 0-1, Darragh O'Donoghue 0-1.		J Goulding 2-5, P Boyle 0-5, E Ross 0-1, M Boyle 0-1, P O'Carroll 0-1.

1 July 2018 Round 2A	Causeway	2-15 - 0-12	Lixnaw	Austin Stack Park
	D Goggin 1-3, B Barrett 0-6, G Dooley 1-2, B Murphy 0-2, J Leahy 0-1, K Carmody 0-1.		S Conway 0-8, D Shanahan 0-1, J Griffin 0-1, J Wallace 0-1, M Conway 0-1.

=== Round 2B ===
30 June 2018 Round 2B	Ballyheigue	1-11 - 3-18	Kilmoyley	Austin Stack Park
	M Leane 1-2, P Lucid 0-4, G Galway 0-2, S Colgan 0-2, R Kenny 0-1.		M O'Connor 1-3, J Brick 1-2, D Collins 0-4, S Maunsell 0-4, C Fitzell 1-0, J McElligott 0-3, K McCarthy 0-1, R Collins 0-1.

1 July 2018 Round 2B	Abbeydorney	0-11 - 0-17	St Brendan's	Austin Stack Park
	M Slattery 0-4, M O'Leary 0-2, S Sullivan 0-1, PJ Keane 0-1, A Healy 0-1, D Egan 0-1, J O'Connor 0-1.		J Egan 0-5, C Hussey 0-4, F Mackessey 0-2, B O'Connor 0-2, D Griffin 0-2, T Moloney 0-1, P Kearney 0-1.

=== Quarter-finals ===
27 July 2018 Quarter-final	Crotta O'Neill's	2-11 - 1-15	Kilmoyley	Austin Stack Park
	S Nolan 0-5, J Conway 1-1, M Lynch 1-0, B O'Mahony 0-2, T O'Connor 0-1, D O'Donoghue 0-1, R Nolan 0-1.		D Collins 0-5, S Maunsell 1-0, J Brick 0-3, T Murnane 0-2, M O'Connor 0-2, K Regan 0-2, J McElligott 0-1.

28 July 2018 Quarter-final	Lixnaw	0-21 - 2-12	St Brendan's	Austin Stack Park
	S Conway 0-11, M Conway 0-4, J Griffin 0-2, G Stackpoole 0-1, S McElligott 0-1, R Heffernan 0-1, J McKenna 0-1.		F Mackessey 0-4, J Wallace 1-0, B O'Connor 1-0, C Hussey 0-2, J Egan 0-2, T Moloney 0-2, D Griffin 0-1, P Kearney 0-1.

=== Semi-finals ===
12 August 2018 Semi-final	Causeway	0-15 - 1-17	Lixnaw	Austin Stack Park
	B Barrett (0-8 0-5 frees, 0-2 '65's), J Diggins (0-2), T Barrett (0-1), C Harty (0-1), J Leahy (0-1), K Carmody (0-1) B Murphy (0-1).	Report	S Conway (1-14 0-9 frees, 0-1 '65') M Conway (0-1), B Brosnan (0-1), J Flaherty (0-1).

12 August 2018 Semi-final	Ballyduff	0-19 - 0-20	Kilmoyley	Austin Stack Park
	P Boyle (0-10, 7f), J Goulding (0-3), J O'Sullivan (0-2), P O'Carroll (0-1), M Boyle (0-1), A Boyle (0-1), L Boyle (0-1).	Report	J McElligott (0-5), J Brick (0-4), D Collins (0-3f), M O'Connor (0-2), R Collins (0-1), T Murnane (0-1).

=== Final ===
26 August 2018 Final	Lixnaw	1-12 - 0-12	Kilmoyley	Austin Stack Park
	Lixnaw: S Conway 0-13 (8f), J Griffin 1-0, S McElligott, M Conway and C Sheehy 0-1 each	Report	D Collins 1-8 (7f), M O'Connor 1-0, K Regan 0-2, J McElligott 0-1

== Championship statistics ==
=== Top scorers ===
Overall

Rank	Player	County	Tally	Total	Matches	Average
1	Shane Conway	Lixnaw	1-58	61	5	12.20
2	Daniel Collins	Kilmoyley	2-29	35	5	7.00
3	Jack Goulding	Ballyduff	3-13	22	3	7.33
4	Shane Nolan	Crotta O'Neill's	0-26	26	3	8.66
5	Pádraig Boyle	Ballyduff	0-25	25	3	8.33
6	Brandon Barrett	Causeway	0-24	24	3	8.00
7	Jordan Brick	Kilmoyley	1-12	15	5	3.00
8	John Egan	St Brendan's	0-14	14	3	4.66
9	Maurice O'Connor	Kilmoyley	2-07	13	5	2.60
10	Philip Lucid	Ballyheigue	1-09	12	2	6.00

Single game

Rank	Player	Club	Tally	Total	Opposition
1	Shane Conway	Lixnaw	1-14	17	Causeway
2	Shane Conway	Lixnaw	0-13	13	Kilmoyley
3	Daniel Collins	Kilmoyley	1-09	12	Lixnaw
3	Shane Conway	Lixnaw	0-12	12	Kilmoyley
5	Jack Goulding	Ballyduff	2-05	11	Crotta O'Neill's
5	Daniel Collins	Kilmoyley	1-08	11	Lixnaw
5	Shane Nolan	Crotta O'Neill's	0-11	11	Ballyduff
5	Shane Conway	Lixnaw	0-11	11	St Brendan's
9	Pádraig Boyle	Ballyduff	0-10	10	Kilmoyley
9	Shane Nolan	Crotta O'Neill's	0-10	10	Ballyheigue
9	Pádraig Boyle	Ballyduff	0-10	10	Abbeydorney
9	Brandon Barrett	causeway	0-10	10	St Brendan's
