= 2014 Kerry Senior Hurling Championship =

Annual hurling competition season

The 2014 Kerry Senior Hurling Championship is the 113th staging of the Kerry Senior Hurling Championship since its establishment by the Kerry County Board in 1889. The championship began on 19 July 2014 and ended on 11 October 2014.

St. Brendan's were the defending champions, however, they were defeated in the semi-final after a replay. Lixnaw won the title following a 1–12 to 0–12 defeat of Kilmoyley in the final.

== Fixtures and results ==
=== Round 1 ===
18 July 2014 Round 1	Lixnaw	0-15 - 0-8	Ballyheigue	Austin Stack Park
19:00	J Buckley 0-4, J Flaherty 0-3, R Heffernan, B Brosnan, and C O’Brien 0-2 each, D Shanahan and F Fitzmaurice 0-1 each.		P Lucid 0-4, S Colgan 0-2, P O’Regan and D Walsh 0-1 each.

19 July 2014 Round 1	Causeway	0-11 - 1-11	Kilmoyley	Austin Stack Park
19:00	P McGrath 0-6, (5Fr), B Barrett 0-2, JM Dooley (Fr), D Leahy and J Leahy 0-1 each.		D Collins 0-10 frees, A Royle 1-1.

20 July 2014 Round 1	Abbeydorney	0-9 - 1-12	Crotta O'Neill's	Austin Stack Park
13:00	D O’Connell 0-9, (8fr).		S Nolan 1-8 (0-5 frees), F Keane and P Quille 0-2 each.

20 July 2014 Round 1	St. Brendan's	2-10 - 0-10	Ballyduff	Austin Stack Park
14:30	J Egan 1-6 (0-2 fr), N O’Sullivan 1-0, Griffin 0-2, C Hussey and K Fitzgerald 0-1 each.		B O’Sullivan 0-5 frees, PJ Connolly, M Boyle, P Boyle, J Goulding and D O’Carroll 0-1 each.

=== Round 2A ===
26 July 2014 Round 2A	Crotta O'Neill's	1-12 - 1-16	Kilmoyley	Austin Stack Park
17:15	S Nolan 1-9 (8 fr), T McElligott, P Quill and M Lynch 0-1 each.		D Collins 0-8 (4fr), F McCarthy 1-0, A Royle 0-3, I Brick and T Murnane 0-2, T Maunsell 0-1.

26 July 2014 Round 2A	Lixnaw	0-20 - 1-18 (AET)	St. Brendan's	Austin Stack Park
19:00	R Heffernan 0-10 (9Fr), J Flaherty 0-3, R Galvin 0-2, G Kelliher, C Fitzmaurice, M Stackpoole (Fr), G Stackpoole and P Corridan 0-1 each.		J Egan 0-11 (0-9 Fr), K Fitzgerald 1-1, R Horgan and D Griffin 0-2, C Hussey and S Leen 0-1.

=== Round 2B ===
27 July 2014 Round 2B	Abbeydorney	0-14 - 0-11	Ballyheigue	Austin Stack Park
14:00	D O’Connell 0-12 (0-9 fr), D O’Mahony and K Dineen 0-1 each.		S Dunne 0-7 (0-6 fr), D Walsh 0-2, A Flahive and M Leane 0-1 each.

27 July 2014 Round 2B	Causeway	1-10 - 3-12	Ballyduff	Austin Stack Park
15:30	P McGrath 0-7, (0-6Fr), JM Dooley 1-0, J Leahy 0-2, M Delaney 0-1.		P Boyle 1-6 (0-3fr), J Goulding and M Boyle 1-0 each, K O’Connor 0-3, B O’Grady, PJ Connolly and B O’Sullivan (fr) 0-1 each.

=== Quarter-finals ===
2 August 2014 Quarter-final	Crotta O'Neill's	0-13 - 1-22	Ballyduff	Austin Stack Park
17:15	S Nolan 0-11 (9 Fr,), R Nolan and J Conway 0-1 each.		B O’Sullivan 0-11 (9 fr), J Goulding 1-1, A Boyle 0-4, B O’Grady 0-3, JP Leahy, G O’Grady and K O’Connor 0-1 each.	Referee: D Kirwan (Cork)

2 August 2014 Quarter-final	Lixnaw	1-14 - 2-8	Abbeydorney	Austin Stack Park
19:00	R Heffernan 1- 6 (5fr), J Flaherty 0-4, J Buckley 0-2, C Fitzmaurice and J Griffin 0-1 each.		D O'Connell 0-6 (3fr), S O’Sullivan and P McElligott 1-0 each, B O’Leary and J O’Connor 0-1 each.	Referee: C McAllister (Cork)

=== Semi-finals ===
29 August 2014 Semi-final	Kilmoyley	0-13 - 0-10	Ballyduff	Austin Stack Park
18:45	S Maunsell (0-4), D Collins (0-3, 2fr), A Royle (0-2), R Collins (0-2), T Maunsell (0-1).		B O'Sullivan (0-10, 10fr).

31 August 2014 Semi-final	St. Brendan's	0-9 - 0-9	Lixnaw	Austin Stack Park
13:30	J Egan (0-7, 3 frees), C Hussey (0-1), N O'Sullivan (0-1).		R Heffernan (0-5, 4 Frees), J Flaherty (0-2), C Fitzmaurice (0-1), P Galvin (0-1).

13 September 2014 Semi-final replay	St. Brendan's	0-13 - 0-14	Lixnaw	Austin Stack Park
17:30	J Egan 0-7, (5fr), C Hussey, K Orpen 0-2 each, N O’Sullivan, F Horgan 0-1 each.		R Heffernan 0-4 frees, J Flaherty, J Buckley, J Griffin and M Conway 0-2 each, B Brosnan and P Galvin 0-1 each.

=== Final ===
28 September 2014 Final	Kilmoyley	0-11 - 0-11	Lixnaw	Austin Stack Park
	D Collins 0-6 (0-3 frees), A Royle 0-2, A McCabe 0-1 (pen), T Murnane and S Maunsell 0-1 each	Report	R Heffernan 0-7 (0-5 frees), P Galvin 0-2, B Brosnan 0-1 free, S Power 0-1	Referee: J Sexton (Cork)

11 October 2014 Final replay	Kilmoyley	0-12 - 1-12	Lixnaw	Austin Stack Park
16:00	D Collins 0-5, (4Fr), S Maunsell 0-3 (2Fr), A Royle 0-2, S Godley and T Maunsell 0-1 each.	Report	R Heffernan 0-5 (4fr), J Flaherty 1-1, E Galvin 0-3, P Galvin, J Griffin and J Buckley 0-1 each.

== Championship statistics ==
=== Miscellaneous ===
- During the championship decider, Lixnaw's Paul Galvin was attacked when a supporter ran on the field wielding a hurley. The pitch invader made contact with Galvin, although he did not require medical treatment and went on to play the full game.
- The final went to a replay for the second year in-a-row. It was the first time that the final was played on a Saturday.
- Lixnaw win the title for the first time since 2007.
- Crotta O'Neill's return having not played in the 2013 championship.

== Top scorers ==
Overall

Rank	Player	County	Tally	Total	Matches	Average
1	Ricky Heffernan	Lixnaw	1-39	42	7	6.00
2	Shane Nolan	Crotta O'Neill's	2-28	34	3	11.33
2	John Egan	St. Brendan's	1-31	34	4	8.50
4	Daniel Collins	Kilmoyley	0-32	32	5	6.40
5	Darragh O'Connell	Abbeydorney	0-27	27	3	9.00
5	Bobby O'Sullivan	Ballyduff	0-27	27	4	6.75

Single game

Rank	Player	Club	Tally	Total	Opposition
1	Shane Nolan	Crotta O'Neill's	1-9	12	Kilmoyley
1	Darragh O'Connell	Abbeydorney	0-12	12	Ballyheigue
3	Shane Nolan	Crotta O'Neill's	1-8	11	Abbeydorney
3	John Egan	St. Brendan's	0-11	11	Lixnaw
3	Shane Nolan	Crotta O'Neill's	0-11	11	Ballyduff
3	Bobby O'Sullivan	Ballyduff	0-11	11	Crotta O'Neill's
7	Daniel Collins	Kilmoyley	0-10	10	Kilmoyley
7	Ricky Heffernan	Lixnaw	0-10	10	St. Brendan's
7	Bobby O'Sullivan	Ballyduff	0-10	10	Kilmoyley
10	John Egan	St. Brendan's	1-6	9	Ballyduff
10	Ricky Heffernan	Lixnaw	1-6	9	Abbeydorney
10	Pádraig Boyle	Ballyduff	1-6	9	Causeway
10	Darragh O'Connell	Abbeydorney	0-9	9	Crotta O'Neill's
