= 2009 Kerry Senior Hurling Championship =

Annual hurling competition season

- Dates: 16 August – 27 September 2009
- Teams: 8
- Sponsor: AIB
- Champions: Kilmoyley (22nd title); Michael Regan (captain); Anthony Daly (manager)
- Runners-up: St Brendan's; Darren Dineen (captain); Mark Power (manager)

Tournament statistics
- Matches played: 7
- Goals scored: 19 (2.71 per match)
- Points scored: 167 (23.86 per match)
- Top scorer(s): Shane Brick (1-26)

The 2009 Kerry Senior Hurling Championship was the 108th staging of the Kerry Senior Hurling Championship since its establishment by the Kerry County Board in 1889. The draw for the opening round fixtures took place on 25 July 2009. The championship ran from 16 August to 27 September 2009.

Kilmoyley were the defending champions.

The final was played on 27 September 2009 at Austin Stack Park in Tralee, between Kilmoyley and St Brendan's, in what was their third meeting in the final overall and a first final meeting in 46 years. Kilmoyley won the match by 1–19 to 2–08 to claim a then record 22nd championship title overall and a second title in succession.

Kilmoyley's Shane Brick was the championship's top scorer with 1-26.

== Format change ==
The championship abandoned the double-elimination format which had been in 2008 and returned instead to a straight knockout format. This was the last year that the straight knockout format was used until 2020 when the COVID-19 pandemic necessitated a return to the format.

== Team changes ==
=== From championship ===
- Decided not to field a team
  - South Kerry

== Results ==
=== Quarter-finals ===
16 August 2009 Quarter-final	St Brendan's	2-12 - 1-04	Causeway	Austin Stack Park
	J Egan 1-6, G Wallace 1-0, T Moloney 0-2, D Dineen 0-1, S Griffin 0-1, Darren Wallace 0-1, P Donegan 0-1.		JM Dooley 0-4, C Dineen 1-0.

16 August 2009 Quarter-final	Ballyduff	1-10 - 0-16	Kilmoyley	Austin Stack Park
	B O'Sullivan 0-7, T O'Rourke 1-1, L Boyle 0-2.		S Brick 0-11, E Sheehy 0-2, P McCarthy 0-1, B Brick 0-1, S Maunsell 0-1.

16 August 2009 Quarter-final	Ballyheigue	0-17 - 3-12	Crotta O'Neill's	Austin Stack Park
	M Slattery 0-8, R Kenny 0-2, B O'Sullivan 0-2, N Flahive 0-1, D Walsh 0-1, J Casey 0-1, WJ Leen 0-1, M Dineen 0-1,		A Keane 0-10, S Nolan 2-0, S Weir 1-1, P Costello 0-1.

24 August 2009 Quarter-final	Lixnaw	0-11 - 1-11	Abbeydorney	Austin Stack Park
	J Flaherty 0-8, P Lyons 0-1, J Griffin 0-1, E Galvin 0-1.		D O'Connell 0-7, D Ryall 1-0, K Dineen 0-2, N Roche 0-1, P McElligott 0-1.

=== Semi-finals ===
4 September 2009 Semi-final	Crotta O'Neill's	3-03 - 4-16	Kilmoyley	Austin Stack Park
	S Nolan 2-1, J Caffrey 1-0, A Keane 0-1, T Cronin 0-1.		S Brick 1-6, M Regan 1-2, J McCarthy 1-1, S Young 1-0, B Brick 0-2, S Maunsell 0-2, E Sheehy 0-1, P O'Sullivan 0-1, M Murnane 0-1.

5 September 2009 Semi-final	Abbeydorney	0-12 - 1-16	St Brendan's	Austin Stack Park
	D O'Connell 0-12.		J Egan 0-6, G Wallace 1-0, D Dineen 0-3, T Moloney 0-3, E Corridan 0-1, S Flaherty 0-1, Darren Wallace 0-1, JP Leen 0-1.

=== Final ===
27 September 2009 Final	Kilmoyley	1-19 - 2-08	St Brendan's	Austin Stack Park
	S Brick 0-9, S Young 1-1, M Regan 0-3, P O'Sullivan 0-2, S Maunsell 0-2, M Murnane 0-1, J McCarthy 0-1.	Report	D Dineen 2-1, J Egan 0-5, JP Leen 0-1, S Griffin 0-1.

== Championship statistics ==
=== Top scorers ===
Overall

Rank	Player	County	Tally	Total	Matches	Average
1	Shane Brick	Kilmoyley	1-26	29	3	9.66
2	John Egan	St Brendan's	1-17	20	3	6.66
3	Darragh O'Connell	Abbeydorney	0-19	19	2	9.50
4	Shane Nolan	Crotta O'Neill's	4-01	13	2	6.50
5	Andrew Keane	Crotta O'Neill's	0-11	11	2	5.50

Single game

Rank	Player	Club	Tally	Total	Opposition
1	Darragh O'Connell	Abbeydorney	0-12	12	St Brendan's
2	Shane Brick	Kilmoyley	0-11	11	Ballyduff
3	Andrew Keane	Crotta O'Neill's	0-10	10	Ballyheigue
4	John Egan	St Brendan's	1-06	9	Causeway
4	Shane Brick	Kilmoyley	1-06	9	Crotta O'Neill's
4	Shane Brick	Kilmoyley	0-09	9	St Brendan's
7	James Flaherty	Lixnaw	0-08	8	Abbeydorney
7	Michael Slattery	Ballyheigue	0-08	8	Crotta O'Neill's
9	Shane Nolan	Crotta O'Neill's	2-01	7	Kilmoyley
9	Darren Dineen	St Brendan's	2-01	7	Kilmoyley
9	Bobby O'Sullivan	Ballyduff	0-07	7	Kilmoyley
9	Darragh O'Connell	Abbeydorney	0-07	7	Lixnaw
