= 2011 Kerry Senior Hurling Championship =

Annual hurling competition season

- Dates: 22 July – 16 October 2011
- Teams: 8
- Sponsor: Garvey's SuperValu
- Champions: Ballyduff (23rd title); Ally O'Connor (captain); Jerry Wallis (manager)
- Runners-up: Crotta O'Neill's; Paddy Williams (captain); Mike Lynch (manager)

Tournament statistics
- Matches played: 13
- Goals scored: 36 (2.77 per match)
- Points scored: 299 (23 per match)
- Top scorer(s): Shane Nolan (4-37)

The 2011 Kerry Senior Hurling Championship was the 110th staging of the Kerry Senior Hurling Championship since its establishment by the Kerry County Board in 1889. The draw for the opening round fixtures took place on 26 June 2011. The championship ran from 22 July to 16 October 2011.

Ballyduff were the defending champions.

The final was played on 16 October 2011 at Austin Stack Park in Tralee, between Ballyduff and Crotta O'Neill's, in what was their third meeting in the final overall and a first final meeting in 39 years. Ballyduff won the match by 2–11 to 0–15 to claim their 23rd championship title overall and a second title in succession.

Shane Nolan was the championship's top scorer with 4-37.

== Results ==
=== Round 1 ===
22 July 2011 Round 1	Ballyduff	4-16 - 0-10	Lixnaw	Austin Stack Park
	P Boyle (3-1), B O'Sullivan (0-9, 8f), M Boyle (1-3), G O'Brien (0-1), A O'Connor (0-1), PJ Connolly (0-1).	Report	J Flaherty (0-7, 6f), J Griffin (0-1), E Galvin (0-1), R Heffernan (0-1).

23 July 2011 Round 1	St Brendan's	1-13 - 3-08	Abbeydorney	Austin Stack Park
	J Egan (1-5, 4f, 1 '65), K Dineen (0-2), D Wallace (0-2), B Sullivan (0-1), D Dineen (0-1), A Dineen (0-1), C Wallace (0-1).	Report	K Hanafin (2-0), J O'Connor (1-0), M Hanafin (0-2), A Healy (0-2, 1f), D Ryall (0-2), N Roche (0-1), B Leen (0-1).

24 July 2011 Round 1	Causeway	1-07 - 1-12	Ballyheigue	Austin Stack Park
	C Harty (1-3), JM Dooley (0-1), E Fitzgerald (0-1), J Fitzgerald (0-1), C Dineen (0-1).	Report	M Slattery (0-7, 4f), F Flaherty (1-2), J Crean (0-1), T O'Connor (0-1), S Colgan (0-1).

24 July 2011 Round 1	Kilmoyley	2-20 - 1-08	Crotta O'Neill's	Austin Stack Park
	S Brick (1-10, 05f, 0-1 '65'), A McCarthy (1-3, 0-1f), M Regan (0-2), P O'Sullivan (0-2), D Collins (0-2), A Royle (0-1).	Report	S Weir (1-3), S Nolan (0-4, 3f, 1 '65'), C Lynch (0-1).

=== Round 2A ===
12 August 2011 Round 2A	Abbeydorney	2-06 - 2-08	Ballyheigue	Austin Stack Park
	B Leen 1-4, K Hanafin 1-0, B Donovan 0-1 free, A Healy 0-1		M Slattery 2-4 (0-4 frees), S Dunne 0-2, R Kenny and J Crean 0-1 each

13 August 2011 Round 2A	Kilmoyley	0-12 - 0-16	Ballyduff	Austin Stack Park
	A McCarthy (0-7,6f), D Collins (0-2), L Fitzell (0-1), P O'Sullivan (0-1), S Maunsell (0-1).		B O'Sullivan (0-8,7f, 1 ‘65), PJ Connolly (0-2), M Boyle (0-2), G O'Brien (0-2), B O'Grady (0-1), JP Leahy (0-1).

=== Round 2B ===
14 August 2011 Round 2B	Causeway	1-11 - 3-07	Crotta O'Neill's	Austin Stack Park
	JM Dooley 1-5 (1-4 frees, 0-1 '65), C Dineen and C Harty 0-2 each M Murphy and R Casey 0-1 each		S Nolan 2-5 (0-4 frees, 0-1 '45), D Carney 1-0, Mike Lynch and C Lynch 0-1 each

14 August 2011 Round 2B	LIxnaw	2-13 - 2-06	St Brendan's	Austin Stack Park
	J Flaherty (0-7, 5F), S Power (1-1), R Heffernan (1-0), J Griffin (0-3), B Brosnan (0-2, 1f).	Report	N Sullivan (2-0), J Egan (0-3, 1f), J Galvin (0-1), S Leen (0-1f), E Corridan (0-1f).

=== Quarter-final ===
2 September 2011 Quarter-final	Abbeydorney	2-14 - 2-15	Crotta O'Neill's	Austin Stack Park
	D O'Connell (0-7, 0-3 frees), K Hanafin (1-2), B Donovan (1-1), B Leen (0-1), K Dineen (0-1), A Healy (0-1), M Hanafin (0-1).		S Nolan (2-7, 0-5 frees), D Carney (0-2), M Lynch (0-2), S Weir (0-1), M Lynch (0-1), C Lynch (0-1), R Nolan (0-1).

3 September 2011 Quarter-final	Kilmoyley	2-12 - 2-14	Lixnaw	Austin Stack Park
	S Maunsell 1-2, A Royle 1-1, S Brick 0-4 frees, D Collins 0-2, M Murnane, A McCarthy and L Fitzelle 0-1 each		J Flaherty 2-6 (0-4 frees, 0-1'65,) B Brosnan 0-3 (0-2 frees, 0-1 '65), J Griffin 0-2, F Fitzmaurice, S Power and K Power 0-1 each

=== Semi-finals ===
25 September 2011 Semi-final	Ballyduff	0-17 - 1-12	Lixnaw	Austin Stack Park
	B O'Sullivan (0-9, 6f, 1 ' 65), PJ Connolly (0-3), M Boyle (0-3), B O'Grady (0-1), P Boyle (0-1).	Report	J Flaherty (1-8, 6f), R Heffernan (0-1), J Griffin (0-1), S Power (0-1), B Brosnan (0-1f).

25 September 2011 Semi-final	Crotta O'Neill's	0-10 - 0-06	Ballyheigue	Austin Stack Park
	S Nolan (0-8. 7f), D Carney (0-1), A Keane (0-1).	Report	M Slattery (0-4f), R Kenny (0-2).

=== Final ===
16 October 2011 Final	Ballyduff	2-11 - 0-15	Crotta O'Neill's	Austin Stack Park
	B O’Sullivan 0-7 (0-6 frees, 0-1 ‘65), G O’Brien and A O’Carroll 1-0 each, P Boyle and P J Connolly 0-2 each.	Report	S Nolan 0-13 (0-11 frees), C Lynch and I McCarthy 0-1 each.

== Championship statistics ==
=== Top scorers ===
Overall

Rank	Player	County	Tally	Total	Matches	Average
1	Shane Nolan	Crotta O'Neill's	4-37	49	5	9.80
2	James Flaherty	Lixnaw	3-28	37	4	9.25
3	Bobby O'Sullivan	Ballyduff	0-33	33	4	8.25
4	Michael Slattery	Ballyheigue	2-15	21	3	7.00
5	Shane Brick	Kilmoyley	1-14	17	2	8.50
6	Kieran Hanafin	Abbeydorney	4-02	14	3	4.66
6	Andy McCarthy	Kilmoyley	1-11	14	3	4.66
8	Pádraig Boyle	Ballyduff	3-04	13	3	4.33
9	John Egan	St Brendan's	1-08	11	2	5.50
9	Mikey Boyle	Ballyduff	1-08	11	3	3.66

Single game

Rank	Player	Club	Tally	Total	Opposition
1	Shane Nolan	Crotta O'Neill's	2-07	13	Abbeydorney
1	Shane Brick	Kilmoyley	1-10	13	Crotta O'Neill's
1	Shane Nolan	Crotta O'Neill's	0-13	13	Ballyduff
4	James Flaherty	Lixnaw	2-06	12	Kilmoyley
5	Shane Nolan	Crotta O'Neill's	2-05	11	Causeway
5	James Flaherty	Lixnaw	1-08	11	Ballyduff
7	Pádraig Boyle	Ballyduff	3-01	10	Lixnaw
7	Michael Slattery	Ballyheigue	2-04	10	Abbeydorney
9	Bobby O'Sullivan	Ballyduff	0-09	9	Lixnaw
9	Bobby O'Sullivan	Ballyduff	0-09	9	Lixnaw
