= 2017 Kerry Senior Hurling Championship =

Annual hurling competition season

- Dates: 1 July – 15 October 2017
- Teams: 8
- Sponsor: Garvey's SuperValu
- Champions: Ballyduff (25th title); Mikey Boyle (captain); Bobby Thornhill (manager)
- Runners-up: Lixnaw; John Buckley (captain); Mark Foley (manager)

Tournament statistics
- Matches played: 16
- Goals scored: 39 (2.44 per match)
- Points scored: 477 (29.81 per match)
- Top scorer(s): Pádraig Boyle (4-51)

The 2017 Kerry Senior Hurling Championship was the 116th staging of the Kerry Senior Hurling Championship since its establishment by the Kerry County Board in 1889. The competition ran from 1 July to 15 October 2017.

Kilmoyley were the defending champions.

The final, a replay, was played on 15 October 2017 at Austin Stack Park in Tralee, between Ballyduff and Lixnaw, in what was their seventh meeting in the final overall and a first meeting in the final in five years. Ballyduff won the match by 4–13 to 1–09 to claim a then record 25th championship title overall and a first title in five years.

Ballyduff's Pádraig Boyle was the championship's top scorer with 4-51.

== Results ==
=== Round 1 ===
| 1 July 2017 Round 1 | Crotta O'Neill's | 0-14 - 3-16 | Kilmoyley | Austin Stack Park |
| | S Nolan 0-11, P Quille 0-2, S Weir 0-1. | Report | D Collins 2-8, M O'Connor 1-2, A Royle 0-3, P O'Connor 0-1, R Collins 0-1, P Maunsell 0-1. |

| 1 July 2017 Round 1 | Causeway | 3-15 - 2-18 | St Brendan's | Austin Stack Park |
| | S Goggins 1-2, K Carmody 1-1, P McGrath 0-4, S Murphy 1-0, C Harty 0-3, A Fealy 0-2, J Leahy 0-2, B Barrett 0-1. | | C Hussey 2-6, J Egan 0-6, D Griffin 0-2, P Mahony 0-1, R Horgan 0-1, K Skinner 0-1, E Leen 0-1. |

| 7 July 2017 Round 1 | Lixnaw | 1-26 - 1-08 | Ballyheigue | Austin Stack Park |
| | S Conway 0-9, J Wallace 1-3, M Conway 0-6, J Griffin 0-2, J McKenna 0-2, C Sheehy 0-1, R Heffernan 0-1, C O'Keeffe 0-1, L Mullins 0-1. | | P Lucid 1-7, D Walsh 0-1. |

| 8 July 2017 Round 1 | Abbeydorney | 0-12 - 0-13 | Ballyduff | Austin Stack Park |
| | N Roche 0-6, J O'Connor 0-3, B O'Leary 0-1, R Donovan 0-1, D Egan 0-1. | | P Boyle 0-8, A Boyle 0-2, M Boyle 0-2. |

| 15 July 2017 Round 1 replay | St Brendan's | 1-13 - 2-07 | Causeway | Austin Stack Park |
| | J Egan 0-8, T Hannafin 1-0, K Hannafin 0-1, D Dineen 0-1, D Griffin 0-1, T Moloney 0-1, E Leen 0-1. | | S Murphy 1-0, S Leahy 1-0, P McGrath 0-2, A Fealy 0-1, B Barrett 0-1, T Casey 0-1, M Murphy 0-1, K Carmody 0-1. |

=== Round 2A ===
| 16 July 2017 Round 2B | Lixnaw | 3-19 - 1-16 | Ballyduff | Austin Stack Park |
| | S Conway 1-6, M Conway 0-9, J Flaherty 1-2, J Wallace 1-0, C Sheehy 0-1, R Heffernan 0-1. | | P Boyle 1-14, J Hussey 0-1, D Goulding 0-1. |

| 29 July 2017 Round 2A | Kilmoyley | 0-19 - 0-14 | St Brendan's | Austin Stack Park |
| | D Collins 0-14, A Royle 0-2, S Maunsell 0-1, J Godley 0-1, R Collins 0-1. | | J Egan 0-5, C Hussey 0-4, S Leen 0-2, D Dineen 0-1, D Griffin 0-1, P O'Mahony 0-1. |

=== Round 2B ===
| 16 July 2017 Round 2B | Abbeydorney | 2-13 - 0-13 | Ballyheigue | Austin Stack Park |
| | N Roche 0-8, R Donovan 1-1, N O'Mahony 1-0, J O'Connor 0-3, D O'Leary 0-1. | | P Lucid 0-7, D Walsh 0-3, J Griffin 0-1, A Flahive 0-1, P Regan 0-1. |

| 28 July 2017 Round 2B | Causeway | 2-18 - 0-12 | Crotta O'Neill's | Austin Stack Park |
| | K Carmody 1-4, J Leahy 0-5, M Delaney 1-0, C Harty 0-2, P McGrath 0-2, T Casey 0-2, A Fealy 0-1, S Goggin 0-1, S Murphy 0-1. | | S Nolan 0-10, P Quille 0-1, T Cronin 0-1. |

=== Quarter-finals ===
| 5 August 2017 Quarter-final | St Brendan's | 1-12 - 1-12 | Abbeydorney | Austin Stack Park |
| | J Egan 0-4, T Hannafin 1-0, K Skinner 0-2, K Hannafin 0-1, D Griffin 0-1, T Moloney 0-1, C Hussey 0-1, E Leen 0-1, A Healy 0-1. | | N Roche 0-10, J O'Connor 1-0, PJ Keane 0-1, A Healy 0-1. |

| 6 August 2017 Quarter-final | Ballyduff | 1-10 - 0-12 | Causeway | Austin Stack Park |
| | P Boyle 0-5, G O'Brien 1-1, P O'Carroll 0-1, A Boyle 0-1, L Boyle 0-1, E Ross 0-1. | | K Carmody 0-5, B Lyons 0-3, C Harty 0-2, M Murphy 0-1, T Casey 0-1. |

| 27 August 2017 Quarter-final replay | St Brendan's | 1-22 - 2-18 | Abbeydorney | Austin Stack Park |
| | J Egan 0-10, C Hussey 0-5, K Skinner 0-5, D Griffin 1-1, T Moloney 0-1. | | N Roche 0-12, R Donovan 1-1, D Egan 1-1, J O'Connor 0-2, PJ Keane 0-1, M Hannafin 0-1. |

=== Semi-finals ===
| 24 September 2017 Semi-final | Ballyduff | 1-17 - 0-16 | Kilmoyley | Austin Stack Park |
| | P Boyle 1-9, J O'Sullivan 0-2, D O'Carroll 0-2, A O'Carroll 0-1, M Boyle 0-1. | | D Collins 0-10, T Murnane 0-2, R Collins 0-1, A McCabe 0-1, S Maunsell 0-1, L Fitzell 0-1. |

| 24 September 2017 Semi-final | Lixnaw | 1-13 - 2-08 | St Brendan's | Austin Stack Park |
| | S Conway 0-8, B McAuliffe 1-0, M Conway 0-3, B Brosnan 0-2. | | J Egan 1-3, C Hussey 1-1, T Moloney 0-1, K Skinner 0-1, D Griffin 0-1, B O'Connor 0-1. |

=== Final ===
| 8 October 2017 Final | Ballyduff | 2-15 - 1-18 | Lixnaw | Austin Stack Park |
| | P Boyle 2-11 (1-0 pen, 1 '65, 4f), J Goulding 0-2, J O'Sullivan and M Boyle 0-1 each. | Report | S Conway 1-10 (5f, 1 '65, 1 s-l), M Conway 0-2, B Brosnan (f), J Griffin, B McAuliffe, J Buckley, R Galvin, J McKenna 0-1 each. | Referee: J Murphy (Limerick) |

=== Final replay ===
| 15 October 2017 Final replay | Ballyduff | 4-13 - 1-19 | Lixnaw | Austin Stack Park |
| | A Boyle 3-1; M Boyle 1-1; P Boyle (0-4frees), D O'Carroll (0-4), L Boyle, J O'Sullivan and J Goulding (0-1 each). | Report | M Conway (0-10, 9 frees), R Heffernan (1-1), B Brosnan (0-3, 2'65), J Buckley (0-2), S Conway (0-2, 1f) and J Flaherty (0-1). | Referee: C McAllister (Cork) |

== Championship statistics ==
=== Top scorers ===
Overall

| Rank | Player | County | Tally | Total | Matches | Average |
|---|---|---|---|---|---|---|
| 1 | Pádraig Boyle | Ballyduff | 4-51 | 63 | 6 | 10.50 |
| 2 | Shane Conway | Lixnaw | 2-35 | 41 | 5 | 8.20 |
| 3 | John Egan | St Brendan's | 1-36 | 39 | 6 | 6.50 |
| 4 | Daniel Collins | Kilmoyley | 2-32 | 38 | 3 | 12.66 |
| 5 | Nigel Roche | Abbeydorney | 0-36 | 36 | 4 | 9.00 |
| 6 | Mike Conway | Lixnaw | 0-30 | 30 | 5 | 6.00 |
| 7 | Cian Hussey | St Brendan's | 3-17 | 26 | 5 | 5.20 |
| 8 | Shane Nolan | Crotta O'Neill's | 0-21 | 21 | 2 | 10.50 |
| 9 | Keith Carmody | Causeway | 2-11 | 17 | 4 | 4.25 |
| 9 | Philip Lucid | Ballyheigue | 1-14 | 17 | 2 | 8.50 |

Single game

| Rank | Player | Club | Tally | Total | Opposition |
|---|---|---|---|---|---|
| 1 | Pádraig Boyle | Ballyduff | 2-11 | 17 | Lixnaw |
| 1 | Pádraig Boyle | Ballyduff | 1-14 | 17 | Lixnaw |
| 3 | Daniel Collins | Kilmoyley | 2-08 | 14 | Crotta O'Neill's |
| 3 | Daniel Collins | Kilmoyley | 0-14 | 14 | St Brendan's |
| 5 | Shane Conway | Lixnaw | 1-10 | 13 | Ballyduff |
| 6 | Cian Hussey | St Brendan's | 2-06 | 12 | Causeway |
| 6 | Pádraig Boyle | Ballyduff | 1-09 | 12 | Kilmoyley |
| 6 | Nigel Roche | Abbeydorney | 0-12 | 12 | St Brendan's |
| 9 | Shane Nolan | Crotta O'Neill's | 0-11 | 11 | Kilmoyley |
| 10 | Aidan Boyle | Ballyduff | 3-01 | 10 | Lixnaw |
| 10 | Philip Lucid | Ballyheigue | 1-07 | 10 | Lixnaw |
| 10 | Mike Conway | Lixnaw | 0-10 | 10 | Ballyduff |
| 10 | Shane Nolan | Crotta O'Neill's | 0-10 | 10 | Causeway |
| 10 | Daniel Collins | Kilmoyley | 0-10 | 10 | Ballyduff |
| 10 | John Egan | St Brendan's | 0-10 | 10 | Lixnaw |
| 10 | Nigel Roche | ABbeydorney | 0-10 | 10 | St Brendan's |
