= 2012 Kerry Senior Hurling Championship =

Annual hurling competition season

- Dates: 28 July – 7 October 2012
- Teams: 8
- Sponsor: Garvey's SuperValu
- Champions: Ballyduff (24th title); Aidan Boyle (captain); P. J. O'Grady (manager)
- Runners-up: Lixnaw; Raymond Galvin (captain); Thomas Fitzmaurice (manager)

Tournament statistics
- Matches played: 13
- Goals scored: 28 (2.15 per match)
- Points scored: 325 (25 per match)
- Top scorer(s): Ricky Heffernan (0-38)

The 2012 Kerry Senior Hurling Championship was the 111th staging of the Kerry Senior Hurling Championship since its establishment by the Kerry County Board in 1889. The competition ran from 28 July to 7 October 2012.

Ballyduff were the defending champions.

The final was played on 7 October 2012 at Austin Stack Park in Tralee, between Ballyduff and Lixnaw, in what was their sixth meeting in the final overall and a first final meeting in two years. Ballyduff won the match by 1–15 to 1–09 to claim their 24th championship title overall and a third title in succession.

Lixnaw's Ricky Heffernan was the championship's top scorer with 0-38.

== Results ==
=== Round 1 ===
28 July 2012 Round 1	St Brendan's	3-11 - 2-12	Causeway	Austin Stack Park
	T Moloney (2-1), D Dineen (1-0, 1 penalty), T Hanafin (0-6, 5f, 1 '65), D Wallace (0-2), K Orpen (0-1), J Galvin (0-1).	Report	P McGrath (0-8, 6f), JM Dooley (2-0), E Fitzgerald (0-2), R Casey (0-1), M Delaney (0-1).

29 July 2012 Round 1	Ballyduff	0-13 - 0-10	Ballyheigue	Austin Stack Park
	T O'Rourke (0-5), B O'Sullivan (0-5, 3f), P Boyle (0-2), E Joy (0-1).	Report	M Slattery (0-6, 4f), J Crean (0-1), D Walsh (0-1), P Lucid (0-1), F Flaherty (0-1).

29 July 2012 Round 1	Abbeydorney	2-09 - 1-11	Lixnaw	Austin Stack Park
	D O'Connell (1-7, 6f, 1 penalty), K Hanafin (1-1), B O'Leary (0-1).	Report	R Heffernan (0-6f), M Conway (1-0, 1 penalty), J Griffin (0-2), E Galvin (0-1), C Fitzmaurice (0-1), J Flaherty (0-1).

29 July 2012 Round 1	Kilmoyley	3-26 - 0-08	Crotta O'Neill's	Austin Stack Park
	S Brick 0-9, A McCarthy 1-3, S Maunsell 0-6, D Collins 1-1, J McCarthy 1-0, T Murnane 0-3, M Regan 0-2, D Fitzell 0-1, JB O'Halloran 0-1.	Report	S Nolan 0-6, I McCarthy 0-1, P Culhane 0-1.

=== Round 2A ===
3 August 2012 Round 2A	St Brendan's	0-13 - 3-13	Ballyduff	Austin Stack Park
	T Hannifin (0-5, 4f, 1 '65'); D Dineen (0-4); D Wallace (0-2); T Wallace (0-1); A Dineen (0-1).	Report	A Boyle (3-1); B O'Sullivan (0-7, 6f); B O'Grady (0-2), P Boyle (0-2); PJ Connolly (0-1).

4 August 2012 Round 2A	Kilmoyley	1-15 - 1-12	Abbeydorney	Austin Stack Park
	S Brick (1-7, 1-2 frees, 0-1 65), D Collins (0-3); A Mccarthy (0-1), J Mccarthy (0-1), B Harris (0-1); S Maunsell (0-1), M Regan (0-1).	Report	D O'connell (1-7, 1-4 frees), B O'Donovan (0-2); B O'leary (0-1), PJ Keane (0-1), D O'leary (0-1).

=== Round 2B ===
3 August 2012 Round 2B	Ballyheigue	0-10 - 2-14	Causeway	Austin Stack Park
	M Slattery (0-6f); F Flaherty (0-2); D Walsh (0-1f); T O'Connor (0-1).	Report	P McGrath (1-9, 04f); JM Dooley (1-1, 0-1 '65'); P O'Grady (0-2); R Casey (0-1); J Leahy (0-1).

4 August 2012 Round 2B	Lixnaw	0-19 - 1-09	Crotta O'Neill's	Austin Stack Park
	R Heffernan (0-11, 0-10 frees), C Fitzmaurice (0-2), J Flaherty (0-2), E Galvin (0-2), S Power (0-1); J Griffin (0-1).	Report	S Nolan (1-6, 1-5 frees), P Culhane (0-1), M Lynch (0-1), C Lynch (0-1).

=== Quarter-finals ===
13 August 2012 Quarter-final	Causeway	2-17 - 3-05	Abbeydorney	Austin Stack Park
	P McGrath (0-6, 4f), R Casey (1-1), C Harty (0-4), JM Dooley (1-0), T Flynn (0-1f), T Casey (0-1), J Leahy (0-1), A Fealy (0-1), P O'Grady (0-1), K Leahy (0-1).	Report	D O'Connell (2-3, 1-2f), D O'Leary (1-0), K Hanafin (0-1).

14 August 2012 Quarter-final	Lixnaw	0-13 - 0-11	St Brendan's	Austin Stack Park
	R Heffernan 0-6, J Flaherty 0-3, J Griffin 0-2, S Power 0-1, C Fitzmaurice 0-1.	Report	T Hanafin 0-6, J Galvin 0-2, D Wallace 0-2, R Horgan 0-1.

=== Semi-final ===
1 September 2012 Semi-final	Lixnaw	0-14 - 0-12	Kilmoyley	Austin Stack Park
	R Heffernan 0-7 (0-6f), J Flaherty and C O’Brien 0-2 each, M Corridan, J Griffin and C Fitzmaurice 0-1 each	Report	S Brick 0-5 (0-2fs, 0-1’65), A McCarthy and S Maunsell 0-2 each, T Murnane, M Murnane, M Regan 0-1 each

2 September 2012 Round 2A	Ballyduff	1-14 - 1-10	Causeway	Austin Stack Park
	B O’Sullivan 0-7 (0-6f), A Boyle 1-1, P Boyle 0-3, K O’Connor, M Boyle and T O’Rourke 0-1.	Report	K Leahy 1-0, P McGrath 0-3 (0-2f), J Leahy 0-2 (0-165), T Flynn 0-1 1f, T Barrett, E Fitzgerald, C Harty and K Carmody 0-1.

=== Final ===
7 October 2012 Final	Ballyduff	1-15 - 1-09	Lixnaw	Austin Stack Park
	B O’Sullivan 0-8 (0-5 frees. 0-1 ‘65), A Boyle 1-1, M Boyle 0-3, T O’Rourke 0-2, P Boyle 0-1.	Report	R Heffernan 0-8 frees, M Conway 1-0, J Flaherty 0-1.	Referee: S Hourigan (Limerick)

== Championship statistics ==
=== Top scorers ===
Overall

Rank	Player	County	Tally	Total	Matches	Average
1	Ricky Heffernan	Lixnaw	0-38	38	5	7.60
2	Darragh O'Connell	Abbeydorney	4-17	29	3	9.66
2	Paul McGrath	Causeway	1-26	29	4	7.25
4	Bobby O'Sullivan	Ballyduff	0-27	27	4	6.75
5	Shane Brick	Kilmoyley	1-21	24	3	8.00
6	Aidan Boyle	Ballyduff	5-03	18	4	4.50
7	Tim Hanafin	St Brendan's	0-17	17	3	5.66
8	Shane Nolan	Crotta O'Neill's	1-12	15	2	7.50
9	John Mike Dooley	Crotta O'Neill's	4-01	13	4	3.25
10	Michael Slattery	Crotta O'Neill's	0-12	12	2	6.00

Single game

Rank	Player	Club	Tally	Total	Opposition
1	Paul McGrath	Causeway	1-09	12	Ballyheigue
2	Ricky Heffernan	Lixnaw	0-11	11	Crotta O'Neill's
3	Aidan Boyle	Ballyduff	3-01	10	St Brendan's
3	Darragh O'Connell	Abbeydorney	1-07	10	Kilmoyley
3	Darragh O'Connell	Abbeydorney	1-07	10	Lixnaw
3	Shane Brick	Kilmoyley	1-07	10	Abbeydorney
7	Darragh O'Connell	Abbeydorney	2-03	9	Causeway
7	Shane Nolan	Crotta O'Neill's	1-06	9	Lixnaw
7	Shane Brick	Kilmoyley	0-09	9	Crotta O'Neill's
10	Paul McGrath	Causeway	0-08	8	St Brendan's
10	Bobby O'Sullivan	Ballyduff	0-08	8	Lixnaw
10	Ricky Heffernan	Lixnaw	0-08	8	Ballyduff
