= 2013 Kerry Senior Hurling Championship =

Annual hurling competition season

- Dates: 19 July – 27 October 2013
- Teams: 8
- Sponsor: Garvey's SuperValu
- Champions: St Brendan's (7th title); Éamonn Corridan (captain); Pat O'Driscoll (manager)
- Runners-up: Lixnaw; James Flaherty (captain); George Fitzgibbon (manager)

Tournament statistics
- Matches played: 17
- Goals scored: 37 (2.18 per match)
- Points scored: 426 (25.06 per match)
- Top scorer(s): John Egan (1-54)

The 2013 Kerry Senior Hurling Championship was the 112th completed staging of the Kerry Senior Hurling Championship since its establishment in 1889. The championship ran from 19 July to 27 October 2013.

Ballyduff entered the championship as the defending champions, however, they were defeated by Causeway in the quarter-finals.

The final, a replay, was played on 27 October 2013 at Austin Stack Park in Tralee, between St. Brendan's and Lixnaw, in what was their first ever meeting in the final. St Brendan's won the match by 0–13 to 0–08 to claim their seventh championship title overall and a first title in 23 years.

John Egan was the championship's top scorer with 1-54.

== Team changes ==
=== To championship ===
- Promoted from the Kerry Intermediate Hurling Championship
  - Kenmare

=== From championship ===
- Regraded to the Kerry Intermediate Hurling Championship
  - Crotta O'Neill's

== Results ==
=== Round 1 ===
19 July 2013 Round 1	Kilmoyley	0-09 - 0-11	Causeway	Austin Stack Park
	S Brick 0-6, D Collins 0-1, S Maunsell 0-1, A Royle 0-1.		P McGrath 0-8, K Carmody 0-1, D Leahy 0-1, A White 0-1.

19 July 2013 Round 1	Kenmare/Kilgarvan	1-09 - 2-15	Abbeydorney	FitzGerald Stadium
	S Duncan 0-7, K Fitzgibbon 1-0, K O'Sullivan 0-2.		K Dineen 2-1, D O'Leary 0-6, B O'Leary 0-3, M O'Leary 0-2, D O'Connell 0-2, D Ryall 0-1.

21 July 2013 Round 1	St Brendan's	0-23 - 0-09	Ballyheigue	Austin Stack Park
	J Egan 0-14, K Fitzgerald 0-3, T Hannafin 0-2, T Moloney 0-2, D Dineen 0-1, D Wallace 0-1.		P Lucid 0-6, R Kenny 0-2, D Walsh 0-1.

21 July 2013 Round 1	Lixnaw	3-10 - 0-07	Ballyduff	Austin Stack Park
	R Heffernan 2-4, P Lyons 1-1, J Wallace 0-2, J Griffin 0-1, B Brosnan 0-1, C O'Brien 0-1.		T O'Rourke 0-2, P Boyle 0-2, D O'Carroll 0-1, E O'Connor 0-1, M O'Connor 0-1.

=== Round 2A ===
26 July 2013 Round 2A	St Brendan's	1-13 - 0-09	Causeway	Austin Stack Park
	J Egan 0-8, K Fitzgerald 1-1, D Griffin 0-2, J Galvin 0-1, T Moloney 0-1.		P McGrath 0-5, M Delaney 0-2, T Flynn 0-1, K Carmody 0-1.

27 July 2013 Round 2A	Abbeydorney	3-13 - 1-22 (aet)	Lixnaw	Austin Stack Park
	D O'Leary 0-7, D O'Connell 1-2, E Egan 1-0, D Ryall 1-0, PJ Ryan 0-2, B O'Leary 0-1, M O'Leary 0-1.		J Flaherty 1-6, R Heffernan 0-8, B Brosnan 0-5, C O'Brien 0-1, S Power 0-1, J Wallace 0-1.

=== Round 2B ===
28 July 2013 Round 2B	Kilmoyley	4-26 - 0-04	Kenmare/Kilgarvan	Austin Stack Park
	S Brick 1-10, A Royle 2-3, D Collins 0-6, S Maunsell 0-4, C Fitzell 1-0, A McCarthy 0-3.		K Fitzgibbon 0-2, P O'Shea 0-1, S Duncan 0-1.

28 July 2013 Round 2B	Ballyduff	3-11 - 1-12	Ballyheigue	Austin Stack Park
	P Boyle 2-3, PJ Connolly 1-1, B O'Grady 0-2, B O'Sullivan 0-2, T O'Rourke 0-2, G O'Brien 0-1.		P Lucid 1-10, S Colgan 0-2.

=== Quarter-finals ===
3 August 2013 Quarter-final	Abbeydorney	2-08 - 0-18	Kilmoyley	Austin Stack Park
	D O’Leary 0-4 frees, B O’Leary 1-1, D O’Connell 1-0, M O’Leary 0-2, A Healy 0-1.	Report	S Brick 0-10 (0-5 frees), D Collins 0-4, P O’Connor 0-2, T Murnane and A Royle 0-1 each.

3 August 2013 Quarter-final	Ballyduff	2-13 - 1-16 (aet)	Causeway	Austin Stack Park
	P Boyle 0-12, A Boyle 1-0, M O'Connor 1-0, T O'Rourke 0-1.		P McGrath 0-12, E Fitzgerald 0-1, C Harty 0-2, J Leahy 0-1, K Leahy 0-1.

11 August 2013 Quarter-final replay	Ballyduff	1-11 - 0-15	Causeway	Austin Stack Park
	P Boyle 0-4, PJ Gorman 1-0, PJ Connolly 0-2, B O'Grady 0-1, A Boyle 0-1, M O'Connor 0-1, T O'Rourke 0-1, KJ O'Connor 0-1.		P McGrath 0-6, C Harty 0-3, T Flynn 0-2, M Delaney 0-2, T Casey 0-1, K Carmody 0-1.

=== Semi-finals ===
30 August 2013 Semi-final	Lixnaw	0-12 - 1-09	Kilmoyley	Austin Stack Park
	B Brosnan 0-8, J Flaherty 0-2, J Griffin 0-1, G Hogan 0-1.		S Brick 1-5, A Royle 0-2, S Maunsell 0-1, M Regan 0-1.

31 August 2013 Semi-final	St Brendan's	0-12 - 1-09	Causeway	Austin Stack Park
	J Egan 0-8, T Moloney 0-2, D Wallace 0-1, C Hussey 0-1.		P McGrath 0-6, K Carmody 1-0, D Leahy 0-3.

21 September 2013 Semi-final replay	St Brendan's	2-18 - 2-17	Causeway	Austin Stack Park
	J Egan 1-12, E McCarthy 1-0, C Hussey 0-3, T Moloney 0-1, JP Leen 0-1, K Fitzgerald 0-1.		P McGrath 0-12, JM Dooley 2-0, J Leahy 0-2, C Harty 0-2, B Murphy 0-1.

21 September 2013 Semi-final replay	Lixnaw	3-10 - 2-09	Kilmoyley	Austin Stack Park
	R Heffernan 3-2, J Flaherty 0-3, B Brosnan 0-3, J Wallace 0-1, E Galvin 0-1.		S Brick 1-6, D Collins 1-1, M Regan 0-1, S Maunsell 0-1.

=== Final ===
13 October 2013 Final	St Brendan's	0-13 - 1-10	Lixnaw	Austin Stack Park
	J Egan 0-6 (2f), C Hussey 0-3, R Horgan, D Moriarty, O McCarthy and T Hannafin 0-1 each.	Report	B Brosnan 0-4 (3f), R Heffernan 1-0, E Galvin and J Flaherty 0-2 each, J Griffin and C Fitzmaurice 0-1 each.	Referee: C McAllister (Cork)

=== Final replay ===
27 October 2013 Final replay	St Brendan's	0-13 - 0-08	Lixnaw	Austin Stack Park
	J Egan 0-6 (0-3 frees, 0-1 ’65), D Dineen 0-2, 0-1 pen, T Moloney, O McCarthy, C Hussey, J Galvin and D Wallace 0-1 each.	Report	B Brosnan 0-5 all frees, J Flaherty 0-2, C Fitzmaurice 0-1.	Referee: J Sexton (Cork)

== Championship statistics ==
=== Top scorers ===
Overall

Rank	Player	County	Tally	Total	Matches	Average
1	John Egan	St Brendan's	1-54	57	6	9.50
2	Paul McGrath	Causeway	0-49	49	6	8.16
3	Shane Brick	Kilmoyley	3-37	46	5	9.20
4	Ricky Heffernan	Lixnaw	6-14	32	6	5.33
5	Pádraig Boyle	Ballyduff	2-21	27	4	6.75
6	Brendan Brosnan	Lixnaw	0-26	26	6	4.66
7	Philip Lucid	Ballyheigue	1-16	19	2	9.50
8	James Flaherty	Lixnaw	1-15	18	5	3.60
9	Daniel O'Leary	Abbeydorney	0-17	17	3	5.66
10	Daniel Collins	Kilmoyley	1-12	15	5	3.00

Single game

Rank	Player	Club	Tally	Total	Opposition
1	John Egan	St Brendan's	1-12	15	Causeway
2	John Egan	St Brendan's	0-14	14	Ballyheigue
3	Shane Brick	Kilmoyley	1-10	13	Kenmare/Kilgarvan
3	Philip Lucid	Ballyheigue	1-10	13	Ballyduff
5	Pádraig Boyle	Ballyduff	0-12	12	Causeway
5	Paul McGrath	Causeway	0-12	12	St Brendan's
5	Paul McGrath	Causeway	0-12	12	Ballyduff
8	Ricky Heffernan	Lixnaw	3-02	11	Kilmoyley
9	Ricky Heffernan	Lixnaw	2-04	10	Ballyduff
9	Shane Brick	Kilmoyley	0-10	10	Abbeydorney

=== Miscellaneous ===
- The final went to a replay for the first time since 2007.
- St Brendan's won the championship for the first time since 1990. It was their eighth championship overall, taking them to fourth position on the all-time roll of honour.
- Lixnaw lost a second successive final. It was their third final defeat since their last victory in 2007.
- Crotta O'Neill's withdraw from the championship.
