= 2010 Kerry Senior Hurling Championship =

Annual hurling competition season

- Dates: 23 July – 10 October 2010
- Teams: 8
- Sponsor: AIB
- Champions: Ballyduff (22nd title); Pádraig O'Grady (captain); Jerry Wallis (manager)
- Runners-up: Lixnaw; Paudie Lyons (captain); Tom Fitzmaurice (manager)

Tournament statistics
- Matches played: 14
- Goals scored: 36 (2.57 per match)
- Points scored: 348 (24.86 per match)
- Top scorer(s): James Flaherty (2-38)

The 2010 Kerry Senior Hurling Championship was the 109th staging of the Kerry Senior Hurling Championship since its establishment by the Kerry County Board in 1889. The draw for the opening round fixtures was made on 10 July 2010. The championship ran from 23 July to 10 October 2010.

Kilmoyley entered the championship as the defending champions, however, they were beaten by Lixnaw in the semi-finals.

The final was played on 10 October 2010 at Austin Stack Park in Tralee, between Ballyduff and Lixnaw, in what was their fifth meeting in the final overall and a first final meeting in 16 years. Ballyduff won the match by 2–18 to 2–09 to claim a record-equalling 22nd championship title overall and a first title in four years.

Lixnaw's James Flaherty was the championship's top scorer with 2-38.

== Results ==
=== Round 1 ===
23 July 2010 Round 1	St Brendan's	1-16 - 1-08	Ballyheigue	Austin Stack Park
	J Egan (0-9, 3f, 1 '65'), J Wallace (1-1), D Dineen (0-2), D Wallace (0-1), J Galvin (0-1), S Leen (0-1), K Dineen (0-1).	Report	M Slattery (1-7, 0-4f), J Casey (0-1).

24 July 2010 Round 1	Abbeydorney	1-08 - 0-15	Kilmoyley	Austin Stack Park
	D O'Connell 1-5, C McCarthy 0-1, K Dineen 0-1, N Roche 0-1.		S Maunsell 0-7, S Brick 0-3, T Murnane 0-1, E Sheehy 0-1, M Regan 0-1, S Young 0-1, C Harris 0-1.

24 July 2010 Round 1	Crotta O'Neill's	3-15 - 4-07	Causeway	Austin Stack Park
	S Nolan (1-8, 3f), A Keane (1-4, 1 '65), I McCarthy (1-0), J Caffrey (0-2), S McAuliffe (0-1).	Report	JM Dooley (3-3, 3f), S Goggin (1-1), S Sheehan (0-2, 1f), C Dineen (0-1).

25 July 2010 Round 1	Ballyduff	0-16 - 0-12	Lixnaw	Austin Stack Park
	B O'Sullivan (0-6, 3f, 1 '65), A O'Connor (0-4), P Boyle (0-4), M Boyle (0-1), A Boyle (0-1).	Report	J Flaherty (0-5f), J Griffin (0-3), E Galvin (0-1), M Conway (0-1), C Fitzmaurice (0-1), R Thornton (0-1).

=== Round 2A ===
14 August 2010 Round 2A	Kilmoyley	1-20 - 2-11	Crotta O'Neill's	Austin Stack Park
	S Brick 0-9 (0-7 frees), M Brick 1-1, C Harris, T Murnane, D Young, and Luke Fitzell 0-2 each, E Sheehy and P O’Sullivan 0-1 each.	Report	S Nolan 2-9 (0-5 frees, 0-1 ‘65), A Keane 0-2

15 August 2010 Round 2A	Ballyduff	3-11 - 2-09	St Brendan's	Austin Stack Park
	M Boyle (1-3), G O'Brien (1-0), P Boyle (0-3), B O'Sullivan (0-2, 1 '65), A O'Connor (0-1), L Boyle (0-1), E Joy (0-1).	Report	D Dineen (1-2), S Leen (1-1), J Egan (0-4f), S Flaherty (0-1), D Moriarty (0-1).

=== Round 2B ===
13 August 2010 Round 2B	Lixnaw	1-17 - 0-20 (aet)	Ballyheigue	Austin Stack Park
	J Flaherty (1-9, 0-6f, 1 '65'), M Conway (0-3), R Thornton (0-1), P Lyons (0-1), S Power (0-1), E Galvin (0-1), B Brosnan (0-1).	Report	M Slattery (0-11, 9 frees, 1 '65'), J Crean (0-2), R Kenny (0-2), S Dunne (0-2), J Casey (0-1), D Walsh (0-1), K O'Sullivan (0-1).

15 August 2010 Round 2B	Abbeydorney	0-08 - 1-15	Causeway	Austin Stack Park
	D O'Connell (0-5, 2f, 1pen), N Roche (0-1), PJ Keane (0-1), B Sheehan (0-1) .	Report	JM Dooley (1-6, 6f), S Goggin (0-4), C Dineen (0-3), D McGuire (0-1), R Casey (0-1).

22 August 2010 Round 2B replay	Lixnaw	2-09 - 2-07	Ballyheigue	Austin Stack Park
	M Conway (2-2), J Flaherty (0-5f), C Fitzmaurice (0-2).	Report	M Slattery (1-4, 03f), J Crean (1-0), D Walsh (0-2), M Dineen (0-1).

=== Quarter-finals ===
3 September 2010 Quarter-final	St Brendan's	0-18 - 2-05	Causeway	Austin Stack Park
	J Egan (0-11, 4f), D Dineen (0-3), T Moloney (0-2), B O'Sullivan (0-1), D Moriarty (0-1).	Report	JM Dooley (1-3, 3f), A Fealy (1-0), C Dineen (0-1), S Sheehan (0-1).

4 September 2010 Quarter-final	Lixnaw	1-12 - 1-10	Crotta O'Neill's	Austin Stack Park
	J Flaherty (1-9, 6f), S Power (0-2), C Fitzmaurice (0-1).	Report	S Nolan (0-5, 1f), S Weir (1-0), A Keane (0-2), C Lynch (0-1), T Cronin (0-1), I McCarthy (0-1).

=== Semi-final ===
26 September 2010 Semi-final	Ballyduff	1-18 - 2-08	St Brendan's	Austin Stack Park
	M Boyle (1-4); B O'Sullivan (0-4f), B O'Grady (0-4); P Boyle (0-3); G O'Brien (0-2); J Bunyan (0-1).	Report	J Egan (1-4, 0-3f); D Dineen (1-2); E Corridan (0-1f); J Wallace (0-1).

26 September 2010 Semi-final	Lixnaw	1-13 - 0-13	Kilmoyley	Austin Stack Park
	J Flaherty (0-6, 4f), M Conway (1-1); S Power (0-2); E Galvin (0-2); F Fitzmaurice (0-1); J Griffin (0-1).	Report	S Brick (0-8, 7f); S Young (0-2), M Regan (0-1); C Harris (0-1); B Brick (0-1).

=== Final ===
10 October 2010 Final	Ballyduff	2-18 - 2-09	Lixnaw	Austin Stack Park
	B O'Sullivan 0-12 ( 0-9 frees, 0-1 '65), A Boyle 2-1, M Boyle and P Boyle 0-2 each, T O'Rourke 0-1.	Report	M Conway 2-1, J Flaherty 0-4 ( 0-1 free), E Galvin 0-2, F Fitzmaurice (0-1 free) and S Power 0-1 each	Referee: S Hourigan (Limerick)

== Championship statistics ==
=== Top scorers ===
Overall

Rank	Player	County	Tally	Total	Matches	Average
1	James Flaherty	Lixnaw	2-38	44	6	7.33
2	Shane Nolan	Crotta O'Neill's	3-22	31	3	10.33
2	John Egan	St Brendan's	1-28	31	4	7.75
4	Michael Slattery	Ballyheigue	2-22	28	3	9.33
5	John Mike Dooley	Causeway	5-12	27	3	9.00
6	Bobby O'Sullivan	Ballyduff	0-25	25	5	5.00
7	Michael Conway	Ballyduff	5-08	23	6	3.83
8	Shane Brick	Kilmoyley	0-20	20	3	6.66
9	Mikey Boyle	Ballyduff	2-10	16	4	4.00
10	Darren Dineen	St Brendan's	2-09	15	4	3.75

Single game

Rank	Player	Club	Tally	Total	Opposition
1	Shane Nolan	Crotta O'Neill's	2-09	15	Kilmoyley
2	John Mike Dooley	Causeway	3-03	12	Crotta O'Neill's
2	James Flaherty	Lixnaw	1-09	12	Ballyheigue
2	James Flaherty	Lixnaw	1-09	12	Crotta O'Neill's
2	Bobby O'Sullivan	Ballyduff	0-12	12	Lixnaw
6	Shane Nolan	Crotta O'Neill's	1-08	11	Causeway
6	Michael Slattery	Ballyheigue	0-11	11	Lixnaw
6	John Egan	St Brendan's	0-11	11	Causeway
9	Michael Slattery	Ballyheigue	1-07	10	St Brendan's
10	John Mike Dooley	Causeway	1-06	9	Abbeydorney
10	Shane Brick	Kilmoyley	0-09	9	Crotta O'Neill's
10	John Egan	St Brendan's	0-09	9	Ballyheigue
