= 2023 Kerry Senior Hurling Championship =

Annual hurling competition season

- Dates: 16 June – 6 August 2023
- Teams: 9
- Sponsor: Garvey's SuperValu
- Champions: Crotta O'Neill's (10th title); Bill Keane (captain); Brendan Mahony (manager)
- Runners-up: Lixnaw; Conor O'Keeffe (captain); Barry Hennessy (manager)

Tournament statistics
- Matches played: 14
- Goals scored: 42 (3 per match)
- Points scored: 536 (38.29 per match)
- Top scorer(s): Shane Nolan (4-38)

The 2023 Kerry Senior Hurling Championship was the 122nd staging of the Kerry Senior Hurling Championship since its establishment by the Kerry County Board in 1889. The draw for the group stage pairings took place on 31 May 2023. The championship ran from 16 June to 6 August 2023.

Causeway entered the championship as the defending champions, however, they were beaten by Crotta O'Neill's at the quarter-final stage.

The final was played on 6 August 2023 at Austin Stack Park in Tralee, between Crotta O'Neill's and Lixnaw, in what was their third meeting in the final overall and a first final meeting in 24 years. Crotta O'Neill's won the match by 0–15 to 1–09 to claim their 10th championship title overall and a first title in 55 years.

Shane Nolan was the championship's top scorer with 4-38.

== Group A ==
=== Group A table ===
Advance to knockout stage

Team	Matches				Score			Pts
Team	Pld	W	D	L	For	Against	Diff	Pts
Lixnaw	2	2	0	0	49	28	21	4
Ballyduff	2	1	0	1	48	36	12	2
Ballyheigue	2	0	0	2	23	56	-33	0

=== Group A results ===
16 June 2023 Round 1	Ballyduff	4-20 - 0-11	Ballyheigue	Austin Stack Park
	K Goulding (2-2), E Ross (1-4, 1-2 fs), D Moriarty (0-6, 5fs), P Boyle (1-0), K O’Connor and M Boyle (0-2 each), D O’Carroll, J O’Sullivan, K O’Carroll and K Boyle (f) (0-1 each.	Report	P Lucid (0-6, 2fs, 2; 65’s), F O’Sullivan (0-2, 1f), S O’Fuarain, G Slattery and N Guerin (0-1 each).	Referee: C O'Regan (Cork)

25 June 2023 Round 2	Lixnaw	3-16 - 0-14	Ballyheigue	Austin Stack Park
	S Conway 0-8, M Kelliher 1-2, R Heffernan 1-0, E Stack 1-0, D Conway 0-2, M Conway 0-1, J Brosnan 0-1, J McKenna 0-1, J Buckley 0-1.	Report	P Lucid 0-9, F O'Sullivan 0-3, T Gaynor 0-2.

2 July 2023 Round 3	Ballyduff	1-13 - 1-22	Lixnaw	Austin Stack Park
	D Moriarty 0-5, K Goulding 1-0, E Ross 0-3, J O'Sullivan 0-1, K O'Carroll 0-1, J Enright 0-1, A O'Connor 0-1, K O'Connor 0-1.	Report	S Conway 0-12, M Kelliher 1-2, J Buckley 0-4, E Stack 0-2, D Conway 0-1, J McKenna 0-1.

== Group B ==
=== Group B table ===
Advance to knockout stage

Team	Matches				Score			Pts
Team	Pld	W	D	L	For	Against	Diff	Pts
Crotta O'Neill's	2	1	1	0	58	36	22	3
Abbeydorney	2	1	1	0	47	34	13	3
Dr Crokes	2	0	0	2	34	69	-35	0

=== Group B results ===
17 June 2023 Round 1	Abbeydorney	4-17 - 0-16	Dr Crokes	Austin Stack Park
	M O'Leary 2-6, O Maunsell 1-2, K Sheehan 1-1, B O'Leary 0-4, D O'Leary 0-2, D Egan 0-1, N O'Mahony 0-1.	Report	M Heffernan 0-9, T Doyle 0-2, C Keating 0-1, M O'Connor 0-1, M Lenihan 0-1, B O'Connor 0-1, G O'Connor 0-1.

23 June 2023 Round 2	Dr Crokes	1-15 - 4-28	Crotta O'Neill's	Austin Stack Park
	M Heffernan (0-7, 5fs), C Keating (1-3), T Doyle (0-2), J Lenihan, M Lenihan and M Horgan (0-1 each).	Report	S Nolan (3-11, 6fs), Declan O’Donoghue (0-5), S Weir (1-1), Declan O’Donoghue (0-3), S McElligott, S O’Donoghue and D Nolan (0-2 each), C White and G Parker (0-1 each).	Referee: D Copps (Cork)

30 June 2023 Round 3	Crotta O'Neill's	1-15 - 2-12	Abbeydorney	Austin Stack Park
	S Nolan (0-6, 4fs), G Parker (1-1), Darragh O’Donoghue (0-3), S McElligott (0-2), T O’Connor, J McKenna and S Weir (0-1 each).	Report	M O’Leary (0-9, 8fs), D Egan (1-1), M Slattery (1-0), N O’Mahony (0-2).	Referee: M Sexton (Limerick)

== Group C ==
=== Group C table ===
Advance to knockout stage

Team	Matches				Score			Pts
Team	Pld	W	D	L	For	Against	Diff	Pts
Kilmoyley	2	2	0	0	42	34	8	4
Causeway	2	1	0	1	43	39	4	2
St Brendan's	2	0	0	2	30	42	-12	0

=== Group C results ===
17 June 2023 Round 1	Causeway	1-15 - 4-13	Kilmoyley	Austin Stack Park
	C Harty 0-6, B Barrett 0-5, G Dooley 1-1, G Mahoney 0-1, D Goggin 0-1, T Barrett 0-1.	Report	M O'Connor 3-3, D Collins 0-6, P Maunsell 1-0, D Nolan 0-2, R Collins 0-1, D McCarthy 0-1.	Referee: E Stapleton (Limerick)

25 June 2023 Round 2	St Brendan's	0-14 - 3-16	Causeway	Austin Stack Park
	F Egan 0-6, G Horan 0-4, E Leen 0-2, F Mackessy 0-2.	Report	B Barrett 0-7, C Harty 2-0, K Carmody 0-4, J Diggins 1-0, P McGrath 0-1, E Murphy 0-1, B Lyons 0-1, G Dooley 0-1, A White 0-1.

2 July 2023 Round 3	Kilmoyley	0-17 - 1-13	St Brendan's	Austin Stack Park
	D Collins 0-10, R Monaghan 0-2, D Nolan 0-1, R Collins 0-1, D McCarthy 0-1, P Maunsell 0-1, J Brick 0-1.	Report	F Egan 0-4, G Horan 1-0, F Mackessy 0-3, D Griffin 0-3, S Brosnan 0-2, F Horgan 0-1.	Referee: N Malone (Clare)

== Knockout stage ==
=== Quarter-finals ===
14 July 2023 Quarter-final	Abbeydorney	1-15 - 2-19	Ballyduff	Austin Stack Park
	M O’Leary (0-10, 7 fs), B O’Leary (1-1), N O’Mahony (0-2), D O’Leary and J Sheehan (0-1 each)	Report	P Boyle (1-7, 5fs, 1’65), A O’Connor (1-1), K O’Carroll, K Goulding, D Moriarty (0-2 each), E Ross, J O’Sullivan, D O’Carroll, M Boyle and J Enright (0-1 each)	Referee: C O'Regan (Cork)

15 July 2023 Quarter-final	Causeway	3-18 - 2-21; Penalties: 3-2	Crotta O'Neill's	Austin Stack Park
	G Dooley (2-0), Joseph Diggins (0-6), B Barrett (1-3, 1-0 pen, 1f), K Carmody (0-5 frees), G Leen (0-2), P McGrath and M Murphy (0-1 each).	Report	S Nolan (1-11, 8fs), S McElligott (1-1), S Weir and B Mahony (1f) (0-2 each), T O’Connor, R Mahony, Declan and Darragh O’Donoghue and B Keane (0-1 each).	Referee: E Stapleton (Limerick)

=== Semi-finals ===
22 July 2023 Semi-final	Lixnaw	0-17 - 1-12	Ballyduff	Austin Stack Park
	S Conway (0-9, 7fs), D Conway (0-2), C Sheehy, M Kelliher, J Griffin, J Buckley, R Heffernan, J Galvin (0-1 each).	Report	P Boyle (0-7, 5fs), K Goulding 1-0, D Moriarty (0-2, 1s/l), A O’Connor, D Slattery, E Ross (0-1 each).	Referee: K Jordan (Tipperary)

22 July 2023 Semi-final	Kilmoyley	0-16 - 2-11	Crotta O'Neill's	Austin Stack Park
	D Collins (0-7, all frees), M O’Connor, J Brick, R Monahan (0-2 each), P O Connor, D Nolan, R Walsh (0-1 each).	Report	S Nolan (0-6, 5f), S McElligott, J McKenna (1-0 each ), D O’Donoghue, S Weir (0-2 each), B Mahony (0-1).	Referee: N Malone (Clare)

=== Final ===
6 August 2023 Final	Lixnaw	1-09 - 0-15	Crotta O'Neill's	Austin Stack Park
	M Kelliher (1-2), S Conway (0-4, 1s/l, 2fs, 2 65s), J Buckley, J Brosnan and R Heffernan (0-1 each).	Report	S Nolan (0-2, frees) and J Conway (0-4 each), S McElligott (0-3), C Trant (0-2), B Mahony and Darragh O’Donoghue (0-1 each).	Referee: C O'Regan (Cork)

== Championship statistics ==
=== Top scorers ===
Overall

Rank	Player	County	Tally	Total	Matches	Average
1	Shane Nolan	Crotta O'Neill's	4-38	50	5	10.00
2	Shane Conway	Lixaw	0-33	33	4	8.25
3	Michael O'Leary	Abbeydorney	2-25	31	3	10.33
4	Daniel Collins	Kilmoyley	0-23	23	3	7.66
5	Pádraig Boyle	Ballyduff	2-14	20	3	6.66
6	Brandon Barrett	Causeway	1-15	18	3	6.00
7	Kevin Goulding	Ballyduff	4-04	16	4	4.00
7	Mikey Kelliher	Lixnaw	3-07	16	4	4.00
7	Mark Heffernan	Dr Crokes	0-16	16	2	8.00
10	Philip Lucid	Ballyheigue	0-15	15	2	7.50
10	Dylan Moriarty	Ballyduff	0-15	15	4	3.75

Single game

Rank	Player	Club	Tally	Total	Opposition
1	Shane Nolan	Crotta O'Neill's	3-11	20	Dr Crokes
2	Shane Nolan	Crotta O'Neill's	1-11	14	Causeway
3	Maurice O'Connor	Kilmoyley	3-03	12	Causeway
3	Michael O'Leary	Abbeydorney	2-06	12	Dr Crokes
3	Shane Conway	Lixaw	0-12	12	Ballyduff
6	Pádraig Boyle	Ballyduff	1-07	10	Abbeydorney
6	Daniel Collins	Kilmoyley	0-10	10	St Brendan's
6	Michael O'Leary	Abbeydorney	0-10	10	Ballyduff
9	Shane Conway	Lixaw	0-09	9	Ballyduff
9	Mark Heffernan	Dr Crokes	0-09	9	Abbeydorney
9	Michael O'Leary	Abbeydorney	0-09	9	Crotta O'Neill's
9	Philip Lucid	Ballyheigue	0-09	9	Lixnaw

=== Miscellaneous ===
- Crotta O'Neill's won the championship for the first time since 1968.
- Crotta O'Neill's reached the championship final for the first time since 2011.
- The championship decider between Crotta O'Neill's and Lixnaw was the first meeting of these two sides since the 1999 final.
