= Pádraig Boyle =

Irish hurler

Personal information
- Native name: Pádraig Ó Baoill (Irish)
- Nickname: Podge
- Born: 3 December 1993 (age 32) Ballyduff, County Kerry, Ireland
- Occupation: Welder
- Height: 6 ft 2 in (188 cm)

Sport
- Sport: Hurling
- Position: Right corner-forward
Club
Years	Club	Apps (scores)
2010-present	Ballyduff	65 (25-358)
Club titles
- Kerry titles: 4
Inter-county
Years	County	Apps (scores)
2012-present	Kerry	2 (0-03)
Inter-county titles
- Munster titles: 0
- All-Irelands: 0
- NHL: 0
- All Stars: 0

Pádraig Boyle (born 3 December 1993) is an Irish hurler who plays for Kerry Senior Championship club Ballyduff and at inter-county level with the Kerry senior hurling team. He usually lines out as a forward.

== Career ==
A member of the Ballyduff club, Boyle first came to prominence at underage levels by winning minor and under-21 championship titles. He progressed onto the club's senior team and has since won four County Championship titles. Boyle first came to prominence on the inter-county scene as a member of the Kerry minor and under-21 teams that won All-Ireland titles in the respective second tier championships. He was still eligible for the minor grade when he was drafted onto the Kerry senior hurling team in 2011, ending the season with a Christy Ring Cup title. He won a second Ring Cup winners' medal in 2015 and has also won consecutive National League Division 2A titles. Boyle's brothers Mikey, Liam and Aidan have also played with Kerry.

== Career statistics ==
=== Club ===
As of match played 3 August 2025

Team	Season	Kerry		Munster		All-Ireland		Total	
Team	Season	Apps	Score	Apps	Score	Apps	Score	Apps	Score
Ballyduff	2010	4	0-12	1	0-01	—		5	0-13
Ballyduff	2011	3	3-04	3	0-02	—		6	3-06
Ballyduff	2012	4	0-08	2	0-05	—		6	0-13
Ballyduff	2013	4	2-21	—		—		4	2-21
Ballyduff	2014	3	1-07	—		—		3	1-07
Ballyduff	2015	1	0-05	—		—		1	0-05
Ballyduff	2016	4	5-31	—		—		4	5-31
Ballyduff	2017	6	4-51	1	1-05	—		7	5-56
Ballyduff	2018	3	0-25	—		—		3	0-25
Ballyduff	2019	4	2-24	—		—		4	2-24
Ballyduff	2020	2	0-15	—		—		2	0-15
Ballyduff	2021	2	0-23	—		—		2	0-23
Ballyduff	2022	5	1-45	—		—		5	1-45
Ballyduff	2023	3	2-14	—		—		3	2-14
Ballyduff	2023	5	3-27	—		—		5	3-27
Ballyduff	2025	5	1-33	—		—		5	1-33
Total		58	24-345	7	1-13	—		65	25-358

=== Inter-county ===
As of match played 10 July 2021.

Team	Year	National League			McDonagh Cup		Ring Cup		Leinster		All-Ireland		Total	
Team	Year	Division	Apps	Score	Apps	Score	Apps	Score	Apps	Score	Apps	Score	Apps	Score
Kerry	2011	Division 2	0	0-00	—		1	0-00	—		—		1	0-00
Kerry	2012	Division 2A	2	3-01	—		2	0-00	—		—		4	3-01
Kerry	2013	Division 2A	5	0-06	—		4	1-03	—		—		9	1-09
Kerry	2014	Division 2A	6	3-05	—		4	5-09	—		—		10	8-14
Kerry	2015	Division 2A	5	0-30	—		4	1-09	—		—		9	1-39
Kerry	2016	Division 1B	0	0-00	—		—		0	0-00	—		0	0-00
Kerry	2017	Division 1B	6	7-11	—		—		2	0-03	—		8	7-14
Kerry	2018	Division 2A	5	1-15	5	0-16	—		—		—		10	1-31
Kerry	2019	Division 2A	6	2-25	4	2-07	—		—		—		10	4-32
Kerry	2020	Division 2A	4	0-08	5	0-05	—		—		—		9	0-13
Kerry	2021	Division 2A	3	0-09	2	0-08	—		—		—		5	0-17
Total			42	16-110	16	2-36	15	7-21	2	0-03	—		75	25-170

== Honours ==
Ballyduff

- Kerry Senior Hurling Championship: 2010, 2011, 2012, 2017
- Kerry Under-21 Hurling Championship: 2010, 2013

Kerry

- Christy Ring Cup: 2011, 2015
- National Hurling League Division 2A: 2014, 2015
- All-Ireland Under-21 B Hurling Championship: 2010, 2011, 2013
- All-Ireland Minor B Hurling Championship: 2009

Sporting positions
Preceded by Aiden McCabe	Kerry Senior Hurling Captain; 2018	Succeeded by Martin Stackpoole
