= Shane Nolan =

Irish hurler

Personal information
- Native name: Seán Ó Nualláin (Irish)

Sport
- Sport: Hurling
- Position: Forward
Club
- Years: Club
- 2000's: Crotta O'Neill's
Club titles
- Kerry titles: 1
Inter-county
- Years: County
- 2010-2022: Kerry
Inter-county titles
- Munster titles: 0
- All-Irelands: 0

Shane Nolan is a hurler from County Kerry. He has played with the Kerry intercounty team and with his local Crotta O'Neill's club.

== Club ==
At club level Nolan plays with Crotta O'Neill's. He won the County League Div 1 title in 2010 beating County Championships Ballyduff in the final.

In 2011 he helped Crotta O'Neill's to their first County Championship final in 12 years. Despite scoring 0-13 of his sides 0-15 and picking up the Man of the Match award Crotta ended up the wrong side of a 2–11 to 0–15 scoreline.

Nolan and Crotta wouldn't return to the final again until 2023. where they faced Lixnaw in the final. Four points from Nolan saw Crotta win a first title since 1968.

== Underage ==
He first made his mark in 2009, helping Kerry to win All-Ireland Minor B Hurling Championship with a win over Westmeath and All-Ireland Under 21 B Hurling Championship with a win over Roscommon titles. He won a second Under 21 title in 2010 as captain of the team after a win over Meath. In 2011, he won a third All Ireland B title and was awarded "man of the match" when they beat Westmeath.

== Senior ==
He first came on the senior team in 2010, helping Kerry win Div 3A of the National Hurling League and later in the year Kerry made it to the Christy Ring Cup final but lost out to Westmeath. He and Kerry returned the following year, and made no mistake second time round and beat Wicklow in the final, where Nolan scored five points. He later picked up the Christy Ring Cup Player of the Year award; He was the first Kerry player to win it.

In 2013, he played in his third final in four years but was on the losing side this time to Down, at the end of the year he picked up a Christy Ring All Star.

He was top scorer as Kerry won the 2014 National Hurling League Division 2A title with a win over Carlow in the final. Nolan lined out in his fourth Christy Ring Cup final where Kerry faced Kildare. Despite being favorites, and 1-04 from Nolan, Kildare took the title on a 4–18 to 2–22 scoreline.

He was part of the Under 21 Hurling/Shinty International team and was captain of the team in 2012.

== Career statistics ==
=== Club ===
As of match played 28 June 2024

Team	Season	Kerry		Munster		All-Ireland		Total	
Team	Season	Apps	Score	Apps	Score	Apps	Score	Apps	Score
Crotta O'Neill's	2009	2	4-01	—		—		2	4-01
Crotta O'Neill's	2010	3	3-22	—		—		3	3-22
Crotta O'Neill's	2011	5	4-37	—		—		5	4-37
Crotta O'Neill's	2012	2	1-12	—		—		2	1-12
Crotta O'Neill's	2013	—		—		—		—	
Crotta O'Neill's	2014	3	2-28	—		—		3	2-28
Crotta O'Neill's	2015	3	2-29	—		—		3	2-29
Crotta O'Neill's	2016	3	0-31	—		—		3	0-31
Crotta O'Neill's	2027	2	0-21	—		—		2	0-21
Crotta O'Neill's	2018	3	0-26	—		—		3	0-26
Crotta O'Neill's	2019	5	5-44	—		—		5	5-44
Crotta O'Neill's	2020	1	0-08	—		—		1	0-08
Crotta O'Neill's	2021	3	0-23	—		—		3	0-23
Crotta O'Neill's	2022	3	1-28	—		—		3	1-28
Crotta O'Neill's	2023	5	4-38	2	0-17	—		7	4-55
Crotta O'Neill's	2024	2	0-17	—		—		2	0-17
Total		45	26-365	2	0-17	—		47	26-382

=== Inter-county ===
As of match played 30 June 2018.

Team	Year	National League			McDonagh Cup		Ring Cup		Leinster		All-Ireland		Total	
Team	Year	Division	Apps	Score	Apps	Score	Apps	Score	Apps	Score	Apps	Score	Apps	Score
Kerry	2010	Division 3A	4	0-02	0	0-00	4	1-02	0	0-00	0	0-00	8	1-04
Kerry	2011	Division 2	6	0-09	0	0-00	4	0-20	0	0-00	0	0-00	10	0-29
Kerry	2012	Division 2A	5	4-13	0	0-00	2	1-03	0	0-00	0	0-00	7	5-16
Kerry	2013	Division 2A	5	4-34	0	0-00	4	2-31	0	0-00	0	0-00	9	6-65
Kerry	2014	Division 2A	6	3-48	0	0-00	4	4-24	0	0-00	0	0-00	10	7-72
Kerry	2015	Division 2A	7	1-34	0	0-00	4	2-35	0	0-00	0	0-00	11	3-69
Kerry	2016	Division 1B	5	1-28	0	0-00	0	0-00	3	1-16	0	0-00	8	2-44
Kerry	2017	Division 1B	5	1-27	0	0-00	0	0-00	3	3-22	0	0-00	8	4-49
Kerry	2018	Division 2A	4	0-18	3	1-03	0	0-00	0	0-00	0	0-00	7	1-21
Total			47	14-213	3	1-03	22	10-115	6	4-38	0	0-00	78	29-369
