= Barry O'Grady =

Irish hurler and Gaelic footballer

Personal information
- Born: Ballyduff, County Kerry

Sport
- Sport: Hurling
- Position: Forward
Club
- Years: Club
- Ballyduff
Club titles
- Kerry titles: 4
Inter-county
- Years: County
- Kerry
Inter-county titles
- Munster titles: 0
- All-Irelands: 0

Barry O'Grady is a Gaelic footballer and hurler who plays with Ballyduff and Kerry. He played Minor, Vocational Schools, Under 21, Junior and Senior football with Kerry, as well as underage hurling. He won Munster Minor Football Championship medals in 2002 and 2003, he also won Munster Vocational Schools medals the same years. He was part of the Kerry team that won the McGrath Cup in 2011 also. He won a County Senior Hurling Championships with Ballyduff in 2006 and 2010. He also won a North Kerry Senior Football championships in 2005 and 2006. In 2003 he was Captain of the Causeway Comprehensive School teams that won County, Munster and All Ireland Vocational Schools titles.

== Honours ==
- McGrath Cup: 2011
- Munster Minor Football Championship: 2002, 2003
- Munster Vocational Schools Championship: 2002, 2003
- Kerry Minor Hurling Championship: 2003
- Kerry Senior Hurling Championship: 2006, 2010–12
- North Kerry Football Championship: 2005, 2006
