= Tom Cronin =

Tom Cronin may refer to:

- Thomas Cronin (born 1940), political scientist and professor
- Tom Cronin (hurler), hurler who plays with Kerry and Crotta O'Neill's
