= John Healy (hurler) =

Irish hurler

Personal information
- Born: County Kerry, Ireland

Sport
- Sport: Hurling
- Position: Goalkeeper
Club
- Years: Club
- 1988s-present: Ballyheigue
Club titles
- Kerry titles: 4
Inter-county
Years	County	Apps (scores)
1995-2009	Kerry	26(2-01)
Inter-county titles
- Munster titles: 0
- All-Irelands: 0
- NHL: 1(Div 2)
- All Stars: 0

John 'The Sock' Healy is an Irish hurling goalkeeper who plays with Ballyheigue and Kerry Gaelic Athletic Association teams.

Healy has won 4 Kerry Senior Hurling Championships with Ballyheigue in 1992, 1996, 1997 and 2000. He was a member of the Kerry team who beat Waterford in the Munster Senior Hurling Championship in 1993. He won a National League Div 2 Medal with Kerry GAA in 2001 and played in losing finals in 2002 and 2006. He was also part of the Kerry team who made it to the 4th round of the qualifiers but lost out to Limerick in 2003.
