= Brendan O'Sullivan (Kerry hurler) =

Irish hurler

Personal information
- Born: County Kerry, Ireland

Sport
- Sport: Hurling
- Position: Midfield/Forward
Club
- Years: Club
- 1990-present: Ballyheigue
Club titles
- Kerry titles: 4
Inter-county
- Years: County
- 1992-2003: Kerry
Inter-county titles
- Munster titles: 0
- All-Irelands: 0
- NHL: 2 (Div 2)
- All Stars: 0

Brendan O'Sullivan is a former hurler with Kerry and Ballyheigue.

== Intercounty career ==
Brendan O'Sullivan was a member of the Kerry senior hurling team during the 1990s and 2000s. He was a member of the Kerry team with beat Waterford in the 1993 Munster Senior Hurling Championship Kerry's first win in the Championship since 1926. He was still part of the team that lost the 2003 National Hurling League Final to Antrim and that made it to the 4th round of the qualifiers only to lose out to Limerick. He captained Kerry to Div 2 league in 1998 when Kerry beat Westmeath. He won a second League Medal in 2001 when Kerry beat Westmeath in the final. He also won a Railway Cup with Munster in 1996.

== Club ==
- Kerry Senior Hurling Championships 4: 1992, 1996, 1997, 2000

== Inter-provincial ==
- Railway Cup 1: 1996
