= Maurice Fitzmaurice (hurler) =

Irish hurler

Personal information
- Native name: Muiris Mac Muiris (Irish)
- Born: 23 May 1869 Lixnaw, County Kerry, Ireland
- Died: 8 August 1954 (aged 85) Lixnaw, County Kerry, Ireland
- Occupation: Farmer

Sport
- Sport: Hurling
Club
- Years: Club
- Lixnaw
Club titles
- Kerry titles: 0
Inter-county
- Years: County
- Kerry
Inter-county titles
- Munster titles: 1
- All-Irelands: 1

Maurice Fitzmaurice (23 May 1869 – 8 August 1954) was an Irish hurler who played for the Kerry senior team.

Fitzmaurice was a regular member of the starting twenty-one during Kerry's most successful hurling period shortly after the foundation of the Gaelic Athletic Association and the start of the inter-county championship. During his career he won one All-Ireland medal and one Munster medal.

At club level Fitzmaurice played with Lixnaw.

His great-grandson, Éamonn Fitzmaurice, was a three-time All-Ireland medalist with Kerry in Gaelic football.
