= Tom Cronin (hurler) =

Irish hurler

Tom Cronin is a hurler who, as of 2008, was playing with Kerry and Crotta O'Neill's.
