= 2011 Christy Ring Cup =

- Dates: 23 April – 4 June 2011
- Teams: 8
- Champions: Kerry (1st title); Mikey Boyle (captain); John Meyler (manager)
- Runners-up: Wicklow; Casey O'Brien (manager)

Tournament statistics
- Matches played: 13
- Goals scored: 39 (3 per match)
- Points scored: 413 (31.77 per match)

The 2011 Christy Ring Cup was the seventh season of the Christy Ring Cup since its establishment in 2005.

== Team changes ==
=== To Championship ===
Relegated from the All-Ireland Senior Hurling Championship

- None

Promoted from the Nicky Rackard Cup

- Armagh

=== From Championship ===
Promoted to the All-Ireland Senior Hurling Championship

- Westmeath

Relegated to the Nicky Rackard Cup

- None

== Teams ==
=== General Information ===
County	Last Cup title	Last Provincial title	Last All-Ireland title	Position in 2010 Championship	Appearance
Armagh	—	—	—		2nd
Derry	—	2001	—		6th
Down	—	1997	—		7th
Kerry	—	1891	1891		7th
Kildare	—	—	—		7th
Mayo	—	1909	—		7th
Meath	—	—	—		6th
Wicklow	—	—	—		7th

=== Stadia and locations ===
Team	Location	Stadium	Stadium capacity
Armagh	Armagh	Athletic Grounds	19,500
Derry	Banagher	Fr. McNally Park	5,000
Down	Ballycran	McKenna Park	5,000
Kerry	Tralee	Austin Stack Park	18,000
Kildare	Newbridge	St. Conleth's Park	13,000
Mayo	Castlebar	McHale Park	49,000
Meath	Páirc Tailteann	Navan	20,000
Wicklow	Aughrim	Aughrim County Ground	4,000

=== Personnel and kits ===
Team	Manager	Captain(s)	Sponsor
Armagh	Michael Johnston	—	Morgan Fuels
Derry	Ger Rogan	—	Ladbrokes.com
Down	Gerard Monan	—	Canal Court Hotel
Kerry	John Meyler	Mikey Boyle	Kerry Group
Kildare	Michael O'Riordan	—	kildareataclick.ie
Mayo	Murt Connolly	Aiden Connolly	Elverys
Meath	Cillian Farrell	—	Martin Donnelly & Co. Ltd
Wicklow	Casey O'Brien	—	Brennan Hotels.com

== Format ==
The tournament has a double elimination format - each team played at least two games before being knocked out.

- The eight teams play four Round 1 matches.
  - The winners in Round 1 advance to Round 2A.
  - The losers in Round 1 go into Round 2B.
- There are two Round 2A matches.
  - The winners in Round 2A advance to the semifinals.
  - The losers in Round 2A go into the quarter-finals.
- There are two Round 2B matches.
  - The winners in Round 2B advance to the quarter-finals.
  - The losers in Round 2B go into the relegation playoff.
    - The losers of the relegation playoff are relegated to the Nicky Rackard Cup for 2012.
- There are two quarter-final matches between the Round 2A losers and Round 2B winners.
  - The winners of the quarter-finals advance to the semifinals.
  - The losers of the quarter-finals are eliminated.
- There are two semifinal matches between the Round 2A winners and the quarter-final winners.
  - The winners of the semifinals advance to the final.
  - The losers of the semifinals are eliminated.
- The winners of the final win the Christy Ring Cup for 2011 and were given the option of being promoted to the Liam MacCarthy Cup 2012, Kerry however decided to remain in the Christy Ring Cup in 2012.

== Round 1 ==
23 April 2011

Kildare	1-21 - 1-25	Kerry
M Fitzgerald 0-5 (4fs), T Murphy 1-2, L Quinn, D Harney 0-3 each, K Divilly, C Kelly, M Moloney 0-2 each, N Ó Muineacháin, B White 0-1 each.	(report)	D O’Connell 0-10 (4fs, 2 65s), S Nolan 0-7, J Egan 1-2, J Flaherty 0-2, J Casey, M Conway, L Boyle, D Dineen 0-1 each.

St. Conleth's Park, Newbridge
Referee: E. Hasson (Derry)

23 April 2011

Down	1-13 - 2-17	Derry
J Coyle 0-11 (6f), G Johnson 1-0, C O'Prey, S Nicholson 0-1 each.	(report)	A Grant 1-3, R Convery 0-6 (6f), O Doherty 1-0, P Henry 0-3, O McCloskey 0-2, M Kirkpatrick, B Quigley, P McCloskey 0-1 each.

McKenna Park, Ballycran
Referee: P. Murphy (Carlow)

23 April 2011

Mayo	1-17 - 1-19	Wicklow
S Broderick (0-7, 5fs), R Cullinane (1-0), N Murphy (0-3), E Madigan (0-2), C Freeman (0-1), G Henry (0-1), K Higgins (0-1, ‘65); K Feeney (0-1),	(report)	J O’Neill (0-10, 9fs), E Glynn (1-2), S Kelly (0-2), D Hyland (0-2), E Kearns (0-1), R Keddy (0-1), A O’Brien (0-1).

McHale Park, Castlebar
Referee: C. Browne (Galway)

23 April 2011

Armagh	1-17 - 2-21	Meath
D Coulter 1-7 (1-0 pen, 0-3f, 0-1 '65') C Carvill 0-6, P McCormack 0-2, P Heaney, M Maguire 0-1 each.	(report)	N Horan (1-5f), P Durnin 1-6 each, N Kirby 0-3, M Cole, D Doran 0-2 each, J Keenagh, G O'Neill 0-1 each.

Athletic Grounds, Armagh
Referee: G. Duffy

== Round 2 ==
=== Round 2A ===
30 April 2011

Kerry	1-20 - 1-17	Meath
D O'Connell 0-7 (6f), J Egan 1-1, S Nolan 0-4, D Dineen, M Boyle, J Flaherty 0-2 each, G O'Brien, A Boyle 0-1 each	Report	N Horan 0-7 (6f, 1 '65'), M Cole 1-1, J Keena, P Durnin 0-3 each, G O'Neill, N Kirby, S O'Donoghue 0-1 each

Austin Stack Park, Tralee
Referee: C. Lyons (Cork)

30 April 2011

Wicklow	3-16 - 2-11	Derry
A O'Brien 2-2, J O'Neill 0-8 (5f, '65'), R Keddy 1-2, L Glynn, E Glynn, S Kelly, D Hyland 0-1 each	Report	P McCloskey, S Farren 1-0 each, A Grant 0-5 (1f), R Convery, M Craig 0-2 each, O Doherty, D McCloskey 0-1 each.

Aughrim County Ground, Aughrim
Referee: S. Whelan (Wexford)

=== Round 2B ===
30 April 2011

Mayo	2-10 - 1-20	Kildare
C Freeman 2-2 (2f), E Madigan, P Connell (2 '65') 0-3 each, N Murphy 0-2	Report	B White 0-8 (4f, 1 '65'), D Harney 1-1, M Moloney 0-4, M Fitzgerald (2f), T Murphy 0-2 each, C Kenny, K Divilly, J Byrne 0-1 each

McHale Park, Castlebar
Referee: J. O'Mahoney (Limerick)

30 April 2011

Down	1-20 - 0-06	Armagh
B Ennis 1-3, G Johnson 0-8 (4f), S Clarke 0-6, C O'Prey, J Coyle, D Hughes 0-1 each	Report	R McGrattan 0-3 (3 '65'), P McCormack 0-2, M Moen 0-1

McKenna Park, Ballycran
Referee: R. Matthews (Antrim)

== Quarter-finals ==
7 May 2011

Down	1-18 - 1-7	Meath
P Braniff 1-1, G Johnson, B Ennis 0-5 each, J Coyle 0-4, S Clarke, E Clarke, C O'Prey 0-1 each.	(report)	. M Cole 1-0, N Kirby 0-4, D Kirby, N Horan, J Keena 0-1 each.

McKenna Park, Ballycran
Referee: E. Hasson (Derry)

7 May 2011

Derry	1-13 - 4-18	Kildare
M Kirkpatrick 0-6 (4f), C McKeever 1-1, O McCloskey 0-4 (2f), O Doherty 0-2.	(report)	M Fitzgerald 2-4, T Murphy 1-2, D Harney 1-1, L Quinn 0-4, C Kenny 0-3, D Kennedy 0-2, M Moloney, T Byrne 0-1 each.

Fr. McNally Park, Banagher
Referee: G. Duffy (Antrim)

== Semi-finals ==
21 May 2011

Kerry	1-18 - 1-17	Down
G O'Brien 1-0, D O'Connell 0-7 (7f), M Boyle, S Nolan (1f) 0-4 each, J Egan, M Conway, D Dinneen 0-1 each	Report	B Ennis 1-2, P Braniff 0-7 (5f), G Johnson 0-3 (3f), S Nicholson 0-2, C Woods (1f), A Savage, S Clarke 0-1 each

Páirc Esler, Newry
Referee: S Whelan (Wexford)

21 May 2011

Wicklow	3-11 - 2-11	Kildare
J O'Neill 0-7, E Glynn 1-1, G Bermingham 1-0, D Hyland 1-0, R Keddy 0-1, L Glynn 0-1.	Report	B White 1-6, D Harney 1-0, T Murphy 0-3, L Quinn 0-1, K Divilly 0-1.

Aughrim County Ground, Aughrim
Referee: D O'Driscoll

== Final ==
4 June 2011

Kerry	2-21 - 2-8	Wicklow
D O'Connell 1-9 (0-5f), J Egan 1-1, S Nolan 0-5, M Conway 0-2, M Boyle, J Griffin, J Flaherty, G O'Brien 0-1 each.	Report	J O'Neill 1-5 (0-4f, 0-1 '65), J Quirke 1-0, A O'Brien 0-2, R Keddy 0-1.

Croke Park, Dublin
Referee: G Duffy

== Bracket ==
Round 1 Round 2B
Derry	2-17
Down	1-13
Wicklow	1-19
Mayo	1-17
Kildare	1-20
Armagh	2-10
Mayo	0-06
Down	1-20
Kildare	1-21
Kerry	1-25
Meath	2-21
Armagh	1-17

Round 2A; Quarter-finals
Derry	2-11
Wicklow	3-16
Derry	1-13
Kildare	4-18
Down	1-18
Meath	1-07
Kerry	1-20
Meath	1-17

Semi-finals
Wicklow	3-11
Kildare	2-11
Down	1-17
Kerry	1-18

Final
Wicklow	2-8
Kerry	2-21

== Championship statistics ==
=== Scoring events ===
- Widest winning margin: 17 points
  - Down 1-20 - 0-06 Armagh (Round 2B)
- Most goals in a match: 5
  - Wicklow 3-16 - 2-11 Derry (Round 2A)
  - Kildare 4-18 - 1-13 Derry (Quarter-final)
  - Wicklow 3-11 - 2-11 Kildare (Semifinal)
- Most points in a match: 46
  - Kerry 1-25 - 1-21 Kildare (Round 1)
- Most goals by one team in a match: 4
  - Kildare 4-18 - 1-13 Derry (Quarter-final)
- Most goals scored by a losing team: 2
  - Derry 2-11 - 3-16 Wicklow (Round 2A)
  - Wicklow 3-11 - 2-11 Kildare (Semifinal)
- Most points scored by a losing team: 21
  - Kildare 1-21 - 1-25 Kerry (Round 1)

=== Top scorers ===
==== Overall ====
Rank	Player	County	Tally	Total	Matches	Average
1	Darragh O'Connell	Kerry	1-33	36	4	9.00
2	Jonathan O'Neill	Wicklow	1-30	33	4	8.25
3	Billy White	Kildare	1-15	18	3	6.00

==== Single game ====
Rank	Player	County	Tally	Total	Opposition
1	Darragh O'Connell	Kerry	1-9	12	Wicklow
2	James Coyle	Down	0-11	11	Derry
3	Martin Fitzgerald	Kildare	2-4	10	Derry
3	Declan Coulter	Armagh	1-7	10	Meath
3	Jonathan O'Neill	Wicklow	0-10	10	Mayo
3	Darragh O'Connell	Kerry	0-10	10	Kildare
7	Billy White	Kildare	1-6	9	Wicklow
7	Nicky Horan	Meath	1-6	9	Armagh
7	Peter Durnin	Meath	1-6	9	Armagh
10	Andy O'Brien	Wicklow	2-2	8	Derry
10	Cathal Freeman	Mayo	2-2	8	Kildare
10	Jonathan O'Neill	Wicklow	1-5	8	Kerry
10	Jonathan O'Neill	Wicklow	0-8	8	Derry
10	Billy White	Kildare	0-8	8	Mayo
10	Gareth Johnson	Down	0-8	8	Armagh

== See also ==
- Christy Ring Cup Champion 15 Awards
