= Darragh O'Connell =

Irish hurler (born 1990)

Personal information
- Born: 19 December 1990 (age 35) Tralee, Ireland
- Occupation: Teacher
- Height: 1.8 m (5 ft 11 in)

Sport
- Sport: Hurling
- Position: Midfield
Clubs
- Years: Club
- 2007–2014 2015–: Abbeydorney; Cuala
Club titles
- Dublin titles: 5
- Leinster titles: 2
- All-Ireland Titles: 2
Inter-county
Years	County	Apps (scores)
2010–2014 2015–	Kerry; Dublin	8 (2-71); 6 (1-2)

Darragh O'Connell (born 19 December 1990) is an Irish sportsperson. He has played club hurling with Cuala and Abbeydorney, and inter-county hurling with Kerry and Dublin.

== Club ==
=== Abbeydorney ===
O'Connell first played with Abbeydorney. In 2008, he captained the club to the 2008 Kerry Minor Hurling Championship.

=== Cula ===
In 2015, he joined Dublin club Cuala. He picked up a Dublin Senior Club Hurling Championship in his first season.

In 2016, he made it back-to-back Dublin Senior Club Hurling Championship titles, and later added a Leinster Senior Club Hurling Championship. Cula later qualified for the All-Ireland Senior Club Hurling Championship final on St.Patrick's Day 2017.

== Intercounty ==
In 2010 in his first year as part of the senior team he helped Kerry win the National League Div 3A title and later to a place in the Christy Ring Cup final which Kerry lost by a point to Westmeath; he later won a Christy Ring Cup All Star. In 2011, Kerry were back in the Christy Ring Cup final; this time they won beating Wicklow. He also won All Ireland Under 21 B titles in 2009, 2010 and 2011.

He was part of the Under 21 Hurling/Shinty International team in 2010 and was captain of the team in 2011.

After playing with Kerry for several years, he later moved to Dublin.

== Honours ==
Kerry

- Christy Ring Cup (1): 2011
- All-Ireland 'B' Under-21 Hurling Championship (3): 2009, 2010, 2011
- National Hurling League 3A (1): 2010

Cuala

- Dublin Senior Club Hurling Championship (5): 2015, 2016, 2017, 2019, 2020 (c)
- Leinster Senior Club Hurling Championship (2): 2016, 2017
- All-Ireland Senior Club Hurling Championship (2): 2017, 2018

Abbeydorney

- Kerry Minor Hurling Championship(1): 2008
