= St Brendan's Hurling Club =

St Brendan's, Ardfert
- Naomh Breandán, Ard Fhearta
- Founded: 1891
- County: Kerry
- Colours: Blue and white
- Grounds: Páirc Naomh Breandán
- Coordinates: 52°19′11.76″N 9°46′41.13″W

Playing kits
Standard colours

Senior Club Championships
	All Ireland	Munster champions	Kerry champions
Hurling:	-	-	7

St Brendan's is a Gaelic Athletic Association hurling club in the Ardfert area of north County Kerry, Ireland. St Brendan's play in the Kerry Senior Hurling Championship. The club is primarily concerned with the game of hurling.

== Honours ==
- Kerry Senior Hurling Championship (7): 1949, 1952, 1967, 1975, 1986, 1990, 2013
- Kerry Under-21 Hurling Championship (8): 1982, 1983, 1984, 1985, 1986, 2005, 2007, 2008
- Kerry Minor Hurling Championship (14): 1961, 1962, 1966, 1969, 1981, 1984, 1985, 2002, 2005, 2006, 2011, 2013, 2022, 2023
- Kerry Intermediate Hurling Championship (2): 1998, 2017

Year	Winner	Opponent
1992	Ballyheigue	St Brendan's Hurling Club
1990	St Brendan's Hurling Club	Ballyduff
1989	Ballyduff	St Brendan's Hurling Club
1987	Causeway	St Brendan's Hurling Club
1986	St Brendan's Hurling Club	Crotta O'Neill's
1980	Causeway	St Brendan's Hurling Club
1977	Ballyduff	St Brendan's Hurling Club
1976	Ballyduff	St Brendan's Hurling Club
1975	St Brendan's Hurling Club	Kilgarvan
1967	St Brendan's Hurling Club	Crotta O'Neill's
1963	Kilmoyley	St Brendan's Hurling Club
1962	Kilmoyley	St Brendan's Hurling Club
1961	Ballyduff	St Brendan's Hurling Club
1957	Ballyduff	St Brendan's Hurling Club
1952	St Brendan's Hurling Club	Crotta O'Neill's
1949	St Brendan's Hurling Club	Ballyduff
1937	Kilflynn Pearses	St Brendan's Hurling Club
