= John Egan (hurler) =

Irish hurler and Gaelic footballer

John Egan is an Irish hurler and Gaelic footballer from County Kerry.
