= Abbeydorney GAA =

Gaelic games club in County Kerry, Ireland

- Mhainistir Ó dTorna
- Founded: 1885
- County: Kerry
- Nickname: Odorney
- Colours: Black and Amber
- Grounds: Tom Healy Park
- Coordinates: 52°20′55.49″N 9°41′28.74″W

Playing kits
Standard colours

Senior Club Championships
	All Ireland	Munster champions	Kerry champions
Hurling:	-	-	6

Abbeydorney GAA Club is a Gaelic Athletic Association is an Irish hurling club from North County Kerry near Tralee, Ireland.

== History ==
Abbeydorney are one of the oldest clubs in Kerry. The club was founded in 1885. They have won Senior County Championships in 1893, 1895, 1913, 1974 , 2024, 2025 & 2026. The official opening of the Abbeydorney GAA club sportsfield took place on 15 May 1977 were Kerry played Galway in hurling and Austin Stacks played Caltra in football. In 2009 the club hosted the first hurling game in Kerry to be played under lights in a North Kerry League game with Ballyheigue.

The 2015 Kerry Senior Hurling Championship final was played in Abbeydorney due to the refurbishment of Austin Stack Park.

In 2024, Abbeydorney ended a 50 year wait for a win in the 2024 Kerry Senior Hurling Championship defeating Ballyduff by a scoreline of 1-17 to 1-10 in the final. The club's win allowed them to take part in the 2024 Munster Intermediate Club Hurling Championship. In 2025, the club won back to back County Championships for the first time in its history, defeating Ballyduff again on a scoreline of 0-23 to 0-17. In 2026, the club completed a magnificent 3 in a row of Senior County Championships, defeating St. Brendans Ardfert on a scoreline of 3-16 to 1-12.

== Roll of honour ==
- Kerry Senior Hurling Championship (7) 1893, 1895, 1913, 1974, 2024 , 2025, 2026
- Kerry County Senior Hurling League Division 1 (3) 2022, 2023 2025
- North Kerry Senior Hurling Championship (2) 2024, 2025
- North Kerry Senior Hurling League (4) 2018, 2023, 2024, 2026
- North Kerry Intermediate Hurling Championship (5) 2001, 2003, 2009, 2021, 2025
- Kerry Junior Hurling Championship (7) 1938, 1947, 1951, 1994, 2000, 2001, 2002
- Kerry County Senior Hurling League Division 3 (1) 2021
- Kerry Minor Hurling Championship (7) 1954, 1956, 1957, 1971, 1999, 2008, 2018
- Kerry Under-21 hurling championship (1) with Crotta O'Neill's 2012
