= Ballyheigue GAA =

Sports club in Kerry

Ballyheigue G.A.A.
- C.L.G. Bhaile Uí Thaidhg
- Founded: 1892
- County: Kerry
- Colours: Orange and Black
- Grounds: John Joe O'Sullivan Park
- Coordinates: 52°23′12″N 9°49′55″W

Playing kits
Standard colours

Ballyheigue GAA is a hurling and Gaelic football club in the Ballyheigue area of north County Kerry, Ireland. The club competes at all levels of hurling at county and North Kerry and also plays some underage football as well as competing in the county junior football league and the county novice football shield.

== History ==
The club was founded in 1892. The field, which is named after John Joe O'Sullivan, was purchased in the 1950s. Club rooms were later built in 1974. A new ball alley, dressing rooms and a meeting room were opened in 2006. The Ballyheigue GAA have won the County Senior County Championship five times: in 1946, 1992, 1996, 1997, 2000.

== Honours ==
=== Hurling ===
- Kerry Senior Hurling Championship (5): 1946, 1992, 1996, 1997, 2000
- Kerry Intermediate Hurling Championship (1): 1975
- Kerry Junior Hurling Championship (3): 2018, 2019, 2020
- Kerry Under-21 hurling championship (6): 1980, 1991, 1994, 1995, 1996, 1997
- Kerry Minor Hurling Championship (3): 1960, 1982, 1992
- County Senior Hurling League (Div 1) (3): 1996, 2002, 2005, 2011
- County Minor Hurling League (Div 1) (1): 1991
- North Kerry Senior Hurling Championship (5): 1946, 1995, 1996, 1999, 2007
- North Kerry Intermediate Hurling Championship (2): 1969, 1975
- North Kerry Junior Hurling Championship (1): 1926
- North Kerry Under-21 Hurling Championship (5): 1979, 1980, 1984, 1994, 1995
- North Kerry Minor Championship (3): 1991, 1994, 1996
- North Kerry Senior Hurling League (5): 1991, 1996, 2000, 2002, 2007
- North Kerry Intermediate Hurling League (1): 2007

=== Football ===
- Kerry Novice Football Championship (1): 1991
- Junior County Football League (Div. 4) (1): 2003

== Notable players ==
- Michael ‘Boxer’ Slattery
- John Healy
- Brendan O'Sullivan
