= Lixnaw GAA =

Irish hurling club

Lixnaw Hurling Club
- Cumann Iomána Leac Snámha
- Founded: 1888
- County: Kerry
- Colours: Green and Gold
- Grounds: Hermitage Park
- Coordinates: 52°24′11.55″N 9°38′07.05″W

Playing kits
Club Kit	Alternate Kit

Senior Club Championships
	All Ireland	Munster champions	Kerry champions
Hurling:	-	-	9

Lixnaw Hurling Club is a Gaelic Athletic Association club in the north of County Kerry, Ireland. They primarily play in competitions organised by the Kerry County Board of the GAA, such as the Kerry Senior Hurling Championship, and also in competitions organised by the North Kerry Hurling Board. The club is principally concerned with the game of hurling but many of their players also play gaelic football, many with Finuge. The club has won 9 Kerry Senior Hurling Championships, 10 Kerry Minor Hurling Championships and 5 Kerry Under-21 Hurling Championships.

== History ==
While the history of hurling in Lixnaw long precedes the founding of the GAA, the club was officially founded in 1888. As reported in the Kerry Sentinel newspaper on Saturday, 17 November 1888, the new club was designated Erin's Hope - Lixnaw and Irremore Branch. The first president was John Trant with Michael Ryan as vice-president. William O'Halloran and John J. Quilter were honorary secretaries with Denis Daly as treasurer. The first club captain was Thomas McCarthy with John Brosnan as vice-captain.

During the following year the separation of the sporting codes became evident with hurling being principally played in Lixnaw and football in Irremore. The hurling club in Lixnaw went by the moniker "Sir Charles Russell" for a time, in honour of an Irish statesman and supporter of Irish Home Rule and the Irish Land League. The naming of clubs and teams in such a fashion being commonplace at the time. The division of the Lixnaw and Irremore elements of the branch took place at this time and the latter competed with some success in the Kerry Football Championship. The Irremore area continues as a source of players for both Finuge and St. Senan's Gaelic football clubs. While football was also played in Lixnaw at this time, the predominance of hurling was increasingly evident.

When neighbouring Ballyduff, representing Kerry, successfully contested the 1891 All-Ireland hurling final, they included players from Kilmoyley and Ardfert and three men from Ahabeg in Lixnaw, Maurice Fitzmaurice, Maurice Kelly and John Murphy.

== Club Grounds ==
In 1965, the club acquired it's existing sports facility at grounds that had formerly been part of the Earl of Kerry desmesne containing the enclosed apple orchard and associated gardens. Located adjacent to the River Brick, the grounds also included a ruined structure known locally as the Hermitage. The facilities were developed over the years with the official opening of Páirc na Díthreibhe - Hermitage Park taking place on the 30th May 1982.

== Roll of honour ==
Kerry County Board

- Kerry Senior Hurling Championship (9) 1933, 1954, 1983, 1985, 1999, 2005, 2007, 2014, 2018
- Kerry Under 21 Hurling Championship (5) 1999, 2002, 2003, 2004, 2016
- Kerry Minor Hurling Championship (10) 1958, 1963, 1965, 1974, 1976, 1997, 2004, 2012, 2014, 2015
- Kerry Minor B Hurling Championship (1) 2006
- Kerry Intermediate Hurling Championship (2) 1973, 1974
- Kerry Junior Hurling Championship (4) 1954, 1973, 1995, 1999
- Kerry Senior Hurling League Division 1 (3) 1979, 1982, 2026

North Kerry Hurling Board

- North Kerry Senior Hurling Championship (3) 1964, 1998, 2011
- North Kerry Intermediate Hurling Championship (5) 1973, 1976, 1995, 2022, 2023
- North Kerry Under 21 Hurling Championship (2) 1978, 2016
- North Kerry Junior Hurling Championship (2) 1973, 1988
- North Kerry Minor Hurling Championship (11) 1956, 1961, 1965, 1976, 1983, 1996, 1997, 2001, 2015, 2016, 2017
- North Kerry Minor B Hurling Championship (3) 1993, 1995, 2018
- North Kerry Senior Hurling League (13) 1942, 1950, 1953, 1954, 1956, 1959, 1960, 1963, 1982, 1983, 2010, 2016, 2017
- North Kerry Senior B Hurling League (6) 1989, 1993, 1995, 1999, 2002, 2012
- North Kerry Intermediate Hurling League (2) 1964*,1977 (* as Ballinclogher)
- North Kerry Junior Hurling League (7) 1942*, 1944*, 1948, 1958*, 1960*, 1994, 2023 (* as Ballinclogher)

== County Senior Championship Winning Captains ==
- 1933: Joe McCarthy
- 1954: Jim Hogan
- 1983: Moss McKenna
- 1985: Moss Allen
- 1999: Trevor McKenna
- 2005: Fergus Fitzmaurice
- 2007: Patrick Dowling
- 2014: Maurice Corridan
- 2018: Darragh Shanahan

== Famous players ==
Maurice Fitzmaurice, Steve Grady (Co-founder of The North Kerry Hurling Board), John McElligott, Jack Kennedy (Co-founder of Ladies Walk Club), Moss Fitzmaurice, Christy Ring (guest appearance), Eugie Stack, Jimmy Hogan, Richie McElligott (nominated for Sunday Independent GAA Team of the Century in 1984 and in whose honour the All-Ireland U20B hurling championship trophy is named), Topper McElligott, Moss Lyons, Johnny Conway, Sean Flaherty, Paul Galvin, Eamonn Fitzmaurice, Ricky Heffernan, John "Tweek" Griffin, James Flaherty, Michael Conway, Shane Conway

== Notable External Managers ==
Aside from the team management, coaching and training functions provided to Lixnaw hurling teams since its establishment by members of the club itself, there have also been a number of managers from outside the club who have been influential, particularly since the start of the 21st century. The following former Limerick, Cork and Tipperary players have had management and training roles with the club's senior team in particular.

- Éamonn Cregan
- Liam O'Donoghue
- Brian Begley
- Ciaran Carey & Mark Foley
- Seánie McGrath
- Conor Gleeson
- Barry Hennessy

== Colours and crest ==
The club has worn a green and gold jersey from the earliest records available. The traditional pattern worn is green with a gold hoop.

The use of an alternate kit to address a clash of colours has only occurred since 2003, when it was used for the first time in the Kerry Senior Championship final. As is generally the case with all GAA clubs, its use is not agreed to lightly given the strong affiliation between club and colours. The alternate or change kit used by many clubs is a variation or inverse of the normal kit or will use a neutral white jersey. Atypically, Lixnaw have adopted the use of a distinctive blue jersey, which mirrors the alternate kit (based on the Munster GAA colours) used by the Kerry team over many decades. While the green and gold jersey is synonymous with Lixnaw, the blue alternate has been associated with a number of memorable successes on the field of play.

The club's crest was designed in 2001 and consists of an image of the Hermitage in Lixnaw with a representation of the nearby river Brick and a salmon on a shield and circlet bearing the name of the club, celtic knotwork and crossed hurleys.
