= Crotta O'Neill's =

Hurling club in Kilflynn, Ireland

- Crotta Uí Néill
- Founded: 1939
- County: Kerry
- Colours: Red and Green
- Grounds: Dromakee, Kilflynn
- Coordinates: 52°21′45.80″N 9°37′56.82″W

Playing kits
Home Kit	Alternate Kit

Senior Club Championships
	All Ireland	Munster champions	Kerry champions
Hurling:	-	-	10

Crotta O'Neill's are a hurling club in the Kilflynn area of County Kerry, Ireland. The club is named after Maurice O'Neill, an Irish Republican. They play in the Kerry Senior Hurling Championship. The club is primarily concerned with the game of hurling. Their pitch is located in Dromakee.

== History ==
The Club have played in 19 Kerry Senior Hurling Championship finals winning 10, including a three in a row from 1943 to 1945 and a two in a row in 1950 and 1951. The most successful time for the club came between 1939 and 1951 when the club won 8 of their 10 County Championships. Jimmy Flaherty was captain for 5 for the wins in 1939, 1944, 1945, 1947 and 1950.

Following their win in 1968 the club did not go on to win another Kerry Senior Hurling Championship for 55 years, losing 7 finals. This drought was eventually ended in 2023 when they beat Lixnaw in the 2023 Kerry Senior Hurling Championship final, beating them by a score of 0–15 to 1–09, a game shown live on the Irish tv channel TG4.

== Roll of Honour ==
- Kerry Senior Hurling Championship (10): 1939, 1941, 1943, 1944, 1945, 1947, 1950, 1951, 1968, 2023
- Kerry Minor Hurling Championship (3): 2016, 2017, 2019
- Kerry Under-21 hurling championship (4): 1992, 2012 (with Abbeydorney), 2018, 2022

== County Championship Winning Captains ==
- 1939: Jimmy Flaherty
- 1941: Jack Kenney
- 1943: Pat Ladie
- 1944: Jimmy Flaherty
- 1945: Jimmy Flaherty
- 1947: Jimmy Flaherty
- 1950: Jimmy Flaherty
- 1951: Tom Nolan
- 1968: Tom Kenny
- 2023: Bill Keane

== Notable players ==
- Jimmy Flaherty
- Dick Spring
- Todd Nolan
- Shane Nolan
- Tom Cronin
- Brendan Mahony
- Tom Kenny
