= Kerry Senior Hurling Championship =

Annual hurling competition

- Current season or competition: 2026 Kerry Senior Hurling Championship
- Irish: Craobh Sinsear Iomána Chiarraí
- Code: Hurling
- Founded: 1889; 137 years ago
- Region: Kerry (GAA)
- Trophy: Neilus Flynn Cup
- No. of teams: 9
- Title holders: Abbeydorney (7th title)
- Most titles: Kilmoyley (26 titles)
- Sponsors: Garvey's SuperValu
- Official website: https://www.kerrygaa.ie/

The Kerry Senior Hurling Championship (known for sponsorship reasons as Garvey's SuperValu Senior Hurling Championship) is an annual hurling competition organised by the Kerry County Board of the Gaelic Athletic Association since 1889 for the top hurling teams in the county of Kerry in Ireland.

The series of games are played during the summer months, with the county final currently being played in Austin Stack Park in early August. Played previously as a straight knock-out competition or using a double elimination format whereby each team was guaranteed at least two games, the current format consists of three groups of three with two group winners progressing to a semi-final with the third group winner playing in a quarter-final round with the three group runners-up. The 2020 championship reverted to a straight knock-out format due to the COVID-19 pandemic.

The Kerry County Championship is an integral part of the wider Munster Intermediate Club Hurling Championship. The winners of the Kerry county final join the intermediate champions of the other five counties to contest the provincial championship.

The title has been won at least once by 21 different teams. The all-time record-holders are Kilmoyley who have won 26 titles.

Abbeydorney are the current title-holders after defeating St Brendan's by 3-16 to 1–12 in the 2026 Championship played at Austin Stack Park in Tralee.

== History ==
=== Beginnings ===
The inaugural championship took place in 1889 with just five clubs entering. These were Abbeydorney, Ballyduff, Kenmare, Kilgarvan and Kilmoyley. The very first championship match was held on 10 March 1889 when Abbeydorney beat Ballyduff by 1–1 to 0–1. Walkovers and delays were regular occurrences in the early years of the championship, while no records exist for some championship finals. More clubs fielded teams as the years went on, with the championships of 1905 and 1913 being held on a league basis.

The championship suffered severe disruption between 1920 and 1924 due to the War of Independence and subsequent Civil War. Several championships were abandoned midway through, while the championships of 1921 and 1923 were cancelled. The last championship which failed to be completed was in 1935.

=== Club dominance ===
Since the beginning, the championship has been dominated at various times by Ballyduff and Kilmoyley who are collectively known as the "big two". They have won 51 championship titles between them. Kilmoyley dominated the first 25 years of the championship, winning ten titles between 1890 and 1914. The 1920s and 1930s saw a number of first-time winners, including Austin Stacks, Causeway and Lixnaw. Crotta O'Neill's also won their first championship in 1939 and dominated the next twelve years by winning eight titles in total.

The second half of the 20th century was dominated by Ballyduff. The club won 19 championship titles in a forty-year period between 1955 and 1995. The only club who came close to matching their dominance was Causeway who won six championships between 1979 and 1987. The first two decades of the 21st century has seen the Kilmoyley-Ballyduff hegemony continue. Kilmoyley won their first title after a 30-year fallow period in 2001, before claiming seven more titles up to 2016. Ballyduff won five championships between 2006 and 2017. Kilmoyley won back to back titles in 2020–21 to give them ten titles in 20 years.

The 2022 final included a first, a live referee microphone for its national broadcast on TG4. It was also the first time the Kerry County Hurling Final was shown on live national TV.

== Format ==
=== Group stage ===
The 9 clubs are divided into three groups of three. Over the course of the group stage, each team plays once against the others in the group, resulting in each team being guaranteed two group games. Two points are awarded for a win, one for a draw and zero for a loss. The teams are ranked in the group stage table by points gained, then scoring difference and then their head-to-head record. The top two teams in each group qualify for the quarter-finals.

=== Knockout stage ===
Following the completion of the group stage, the top two teams from each group are ranked (1–6) in terms of points accumulated and scoring difference. The two top-ranking teams receive byes to separate semi-finals.

Quarter-finals: Teams designated 3–6 contest this round. The two winners from these two games advance to the semi-finals.

Semi-finals: The two quarter-final winners and teams designated 1–2 contest this round. The two winners from these two games advance to the final.

Final: The two semi-final winners contest the final. The winning team are declared champions.

=== Relegation ===
There is no automatic relegation to the Kerry Intermediate Hurling Championship.

=== Qualification ===
At the end of the championship, the winning team qualifies to the subsequent Munster Intermediate Club Hurling Championship.

== Teams ==
=== 2026 Teams ===
The 9 teams competing in the 2026 Kerry Senior Hurling Championship are:

Team	Location	Division	Colours	Championship titles	Last championship title
Abbeydorney	Abbeydorney	North Kerry	Black and amber	7	2026
Ballyduff	Ballyduff	North Kerry	Green and white	25	2017
Ballyheigue	Ballyheigue	North Kerry	Orange and black	5	2000
Causeway	Causeway	North Kerry	Maroon and white	9	2022
Crotta O'Neill's	Kilflynn	North Kerry	Red and green	10	2023
Kilmoyley	Kilmoyley	North Kerry	Green and gold	26	2021
Lixnaw	Lixnaw	North Kerry	Green and gold	9	2018
St Brendan's	Ardfert	North Kerry	Blue and white	7	2013
Tralee Parnells	Tralee	Tralee District	Blue and white	2	1919

== Trophy ==
The Neilus Flynn Cup is presented to the winners of the championship and is named after Neilus Flynn, who captained Causeway and St Brendan's (Div.) to County Championship successes in 1932 and 1936 respectively. The Flynn family donated both the original trophy (in 1987) and the new cup to the Kerry County Board. The current trophy, which was designed by silversmith Fintan Foley, was presented for the first time to the 2018 champions, Lixnaw.

== Roll of honour ==
=== By club ===
#	Team	Titles	Runners-Up	Championships won	Championships runner-up
1	Kilmoyley	26	16	1890, 1892, 1894, 1895, 1900*, 1901, 1905, 1907, 1910, 1914, 1948, 1962, 1963, 1964, 1970, 1971, 2001, 2002, 2003, 2004, 2008, 2009, 2015, 2016, 2020, 2021	1889, 1891, 1893, 1903, 1908, 1946, 1950, 1955, 1956, 1958, 1965, 1983, 1988, 2007, 2014, 2018
2	Ballyduff	25	13	1891, 1955, 1957, 1959, 1960, 1961, 1965, 1966, 1972, 1973, 1976, 1977, 1978, 1984, 1988, 1989, 1991, 1993, 1994, 1995, 2006, 2010, 2011, 2012, 2017	1890, 1892, 1912, 1938, 1949, 1981, 1990, 1996, 2000, 2016, 2022, 2024, 2025
3	Crotta O'Neill's	10	10	1939, 1941, 1943, 1944, 1945, 1947, 1950, 1951, 1968, 2023	1952, 1957, 1967, 1972, 1979, 1985, 1986, 1998, 1999, 2011
4	Lixnaw	9	21	1933, 1954, 1983, 1985, 1999, 2005, 2007, 2014, 2018	1894, 1896, 1901, 1907, 1914*, 1942, 1953, 1960, 1964, 1966, 1982, 1993, 1994, 2002, 2003, 2010, 2012, 2013, 2017, 2019, 2023
4	Causeway	9	8	1932, 1979, 1980, 1981, 1982, 1987, 1998, 2019, 2022	1973, 1978, 1984, 1997, 2004, 2006, 2008, 2020
6	Abbeydorney	7	4	1893, 1896, 1913, 1974, 2024, 2025, 2026	1900*, 1954, 1971, 2005
6	St Brendan's	7	14	1949, 1952, 1967, 1975, 1986, 1990, 2013	1937, 1961, 1962, 1963, 1976, 1977, 1980, 1987, 1989, 1992, 2009, 2015, 2021, 2026
8	Ballyheigue	5	4	1946, 1992, 1996, 1997, 2000	1941, 1948, 1995, 2001
9	Kenmare Shamrocks	4	9	1889, 1902, 1916*, 1942	1895, 1904, 1910, 1916, 1917, 1943, 1945, 1947, 1991
10	Kilgarvan	3	5	1953, 1956, 1958	1918, 1919, 1944, 1959, 1975
10	Austin Stacks	3	3	1928, 1929, 1931	1968, 1969, 1974
10	Tralee Mitchels	3	0	1908, 1911, 1912	—
13	Tralee Celtic	2	1	1903, 1904	1902
13	Tralee Parnells	2	1	1918, 1919	1911
13	Kilflynn Pearses*	2	0	1937, 1938	—
16	Killarney	1	2	1969	1951, 1970
16	Tullig	1	0	1916*	—
16	Tubrid	1	0	1917	—
16	Tralee	1	0	1925	—
16	St. Brendans	1	0	1936	—
16	Banna	1	0	1940	—
22	Boherbee	0	2	—	1928, 1929
22	Kilflynn	0	2	—	1931, 1933
22	North Kerry	0	1	—	1925
22	Rathmore	0	1	—	1932
22	John Mitchels	0	1	—	1936
22	Shannon Rovers	0	1	—	1939
22	Dingle	0	1	—	1940

=== Roll of honour notes ===
- 1900 — as Kilmoyley A
- 1900 — as Abbeydorney B
- 1905 and 1913 — run on a league basis
- 1914 — as Lixnaw Davis'
- 1916 — disputed
- 1928, 1929, 1931 — All as Rock Street
- Kilflynn Pearses — Divisional team (Crotta & Kilflynn)
- St. Brendans — Divisional team (Ardfert, Causeway & Ballyheigue)

== List of Finals ==
=== Legend ===
- Gold – Munster intermediate club champions
- Silver – Munster intermediate club runners-up

=== List of Kerry SHC finals ===
Year	Winners		Runners-up		Winning captain
Year	Club	Score	Club	Score	Winning captain
2026	Abbeydorney	3-16	St Brendan's, Ardfert	1-12	James O'Connor & Michael O'Leary
2025	Abbeydorney	0-23	Ballyduff	0-17	James O'Connor & Michael O'Leary
2024	Abbeydorney	1-17	Ballyduff	1-10	James O'Connor
2023	Crotta O'Neill's	0-15	Lixnaw	1-09	Bill Keane
2022	Causeway	2-15	Ballyduff	0-16	Jason Diggins
2021	Kilmoyley	1-14	St Brendan's, Ardfert	1-11	Florence McCarthy
2020	Kilmoyley	2-12	Causeway	1-14	John B. O'Halloran
2019	Causeway	2-13	Lixnaw	1-13	Muiris Delaney
2018	Lixnaw	1-16	Kilmoyley	2-11	Darragh Shanahan
2017	Ballyduff	4-13	Lixnaw	1-19	Mikey Boyle
2016	Kilmoyley	1-17, 1-18 (R)	Ballyduff	2-14, 2-13 (R)	Aidan McCabe
2015	Kilmoyley	3–15	St Brendan's, Ardfert	1–13	Sean Maunsell
2014	Lixnaw	1–12	Kilmoyley	0–12	Maurice Corridan
2013	St Brendan's, Ardfert	0–13, 0–13 (R)	Lixnaw	1–10, 0–08 (R)	Eamon Corridon
2012	Ballyduff	1–15	Lixnaw	1–09	Aidan Boyle
2011	Ballyduff	2–11	Crotta O'Neill's	0–15	Ally O'Connor
2010	Ballyduff	2–18	Lixnaw	2–09	Padraig O'Grady
2009	Kilmoyley	1–19	St Brendan's, Ardfert	2–08	Micheal Regan
2008	Kilmoyley	2–18	Causeway	0–08	Tom Murnane
2007	Lixnaw	1–15	Kilmoyley	2–06	Patrick Dowling
2006	Ballyduff	1–17	Causeway	1–11	David Slattery
2005	Lixnaw	0–17 (replay)	Abbeydorney	0–06	Fergus Fitzmaurice
2004	Kilmoyley	2–15	Causeway	2–09	Shane Brick
2003	Kilmoyley	2–10	Lixnaw	1–05	Maurice Murnane
2002	Kilmoyley	1–16	Lixnaw	2–07	Ian Brick
2001	Kilmoyley	2–08	Ballyheigue	2–07	James McCarthy
2000	Ballyheigue	1–06	Ballyduff	0–08	Michael ‘Boxer’ Slattery
1999	Lixnaw	0–09 (replay)	Crotta O'Neill's	1–05	Trevor McKenna
1998	Causeway	1-14	Crotta O'Neill's	2-10	Maurice O'Carroll
1997	Ballyheigue	0-13	Causeway	0-05	Nicholas Roche
1996	Ballyheigue	2-09	Ballyduff	0-07	Patrick O’Mahony
1995	Ballyduff	3-09	Ballyheigue	2-05	Christy Ross
1994	Ballyduff	2-07	Lixnaw	0-10	Noel Browne
1993	Ballyduff	2-10	Lixnaw	0-08	Liam Ross
1992	Ballyheigue	1-10	St. Brendan's, Ardfert	1-09	Patrick O’Mahony
1991	Ballyduff	0–11	Kenmare	0–07	Jimmy O'Sullivan
1990	St Brendan's, Ardfert	3–08	Ballyduff	0–14	Philip Stack
1989	Ballyduff	1–12	St Brendan's, Ardfert	0–06	John Hennessy
1988	Ballyduff	1-05	Kilmoyley	1-04	Tadgh O'Halloran
1987	Causeway	2-11	St Brendan's, Ardfert	1-09	Anthony O'Connor
1986	St Brendan's, Ardfert	3-11	Crotta O'Neill's	2-04	John Crowley
1985	Lixnaw	2-11	Crotta O'Neill's	0-11	Moss Allen
1984	Ballyduff	3-08	Causeway	2-03	Tom O'Sullivan
1983	Lixnaw	1-09	Kilmoyley	1-06	Moss McKenna
1982	Causeway	2-11	Lixnaw	0-09	Gerald O'Grady
1981	Causeway	2-11	Ballyduff	1-10	Maurice Leahy
1980	Causeway	0-11	St Brendan's, Ardfert	0-05	Roy Dineen
1979	Causeway	4-06	Crotta O'Neill's	1-12	Roger Hussy
1978	Ballyduff	0-09	Causeway	0-06	Mike Carroll
1977	Ballyduff	4-06	St Brendan's, Ardfert	1-00	Liam Boyle
1976	Ballyduff	2-08	St Brendan's, Ardfert	2-06	Eamonn O'Sullivan
1975	St Brendan's, Ardfert	5-07	Kilgarvan	3-06	James McGrath
1974	Abbeydorney	3-08	Austin Stacks	1-04	Tony Behan
1973	Ballyduff	1-14	Causeway	1-06	Pat Costello
1972	Ballyduff	2-09	Crotta O'Neill's	0-07	Johnny Bunyan
1971	Kilmoyley	2-12	Abbeydorney	1-12	Mike Fitzgerald
1970	Kilmoyley	2-12	Killarney	4-04	Patsy O'Connor
1969	Killarney	2-06	Austin Stacks	2-05	Con O' Mara
1968	Crotta O'Neill's	1-06	Austin Stacks	1-05	Tom Kenny
1967	St Brendan's, Ardfert	1-08	Crotta O'Neill's	1-06	John O' Sullivan
1966	Ballyduff	3-08	Lixnaw	3-07	Thomas Leen
1965	Ballyduff	2-11	Kilmoyley	2-03	Mike Joe Quinlan
1964	Kilmoyley	4-14	Lixnaw	5-05	Michael Regan
1963	Kilmoyley	W/O	St Brendan's, Ardfert		John Flanagan
1962	Kilmoyley	7-10	St Brendan's, Ardfert	4-03	Michael Curran
1961	Ballyduff	5-07	St Brendan's, Ardfert	4-04	Richie McCarthy
1960	Ballyduff	1-07	Lixnaw	1-05	Stephen O'Sullivan
1959	Ballyduff	3-05	Kilgarvan	2-02	Teddy Hennessy
1958	Kilgarvan	2-05	Kilmoyley	0-03	Denis Hegarty
1957	Ballyduff	5-05	Crotta O'Neill's	2-00	Brendan Hennessy
1956	Kilgarvan	6-06	Kilmoyley	2-03	Paudie Healy
1955	Ballyduff	3-01	Kilmoyley	1-02	Michael Hennessy
1954	Lixnaw	5-04	Abbeydorney	1-01	Jim Hogan
1953	Kilgarvan	4-04	Lixnaw	2-01	Richie Purcell
1952	St Brendan's, Ardfert	3-04	Crotta O'Neill's	2-02	Johnny Hussey
1951	Crotta O'Neill's	3-03	Killarney	2-01	Tom Nolan
1950	Crotta O'Neill's	6-02	Kilmoyley	4-01	Jimmy Flaherty
1949	St Brendan's, Ardfert	4-02	Ballyduff	2-04	Frank Kissane
1948	Kilmoyley	5-02	Ballyheigue	3-06	Mick McGrath
1947	Crotta O'Neill's	4-07	Kenmare	1-03	Jimmy Flaherty
1946	Ballyheigue	2-01	Kilmoyley	0-02	Christy O’Mahony
1945	Crotta O'Neill's	5-07	Kenmare	2-05	Jimmy Flaherty
1944	Crotta O'Neill's	9-05	Kilgarvan	2-02	Jimmy Flaherty
1943	Crotta O'Neill's	3-03	Kenmare	1-03	Pat Ladie
1942	Kenmare	2-04	Lixnaw	2-02	Jerry McCarthy
1941	Crotta O'Neill's	4-03	Ballyheigue	2-03	Jack Kenney
1940	Banna	5-03	Dingle	2-03	Johnny Hussey
1939	Crotta O'Neill's	8-06	Shannon Rovers	6-00	Jimmy Flaherty
1938	Kilflynn Pearses	4-03	Ballyduff	4-01	John Twomey
1937	Kilflynn Pearses	7-01	St Brendan's, Ardfert	3-01	Willie Shanahan
1936	St. Brendan's (Div)	5-01	John Mitchels	1-01	Neilus Flynn
1935	Not Played				
1934	Not Completed				
1933	Lixnaw	2-01	Kilflynn	0-03	Joe Barrett (Austin Stacks)
1932	Causeway	3-07	Rathmore	2-02	Neilus Flynn
1931	Rock Street	8-02	Kilflynn	7-03	Joe Barrett
1930	Abandoned				
1929	Rock Street	5-02	Boherbee	0-06	Dan Rayn
1928	Rock Street	4-02	Boherbee	0-02	Joe Barrett
1927	Championship Not Held				
1926	Championship Not Held				
1925	Tralee	8-05	North Kerry	2-03	Jer "Pluggy" Moriarty
1924	Abandoned				
1923	Not Played				
1922	Not Completed				
1921	Not Played				
1920	Abandoned				
1919	Tralee Parnells	W/O	Kilgarvan		John Dunne
1918	Tralee Parnells	1-10	Kilgarvan	4-00	John Dunne
1917	Tubridy	(game abandoned)	Kenmare		Pat Carmody
1916	Tullig Gamecocks	2-04	Kenmare	2-01	Willie Mangan
1915	Not Played				
1914	Kilmoyley	W/O	Lixnaw Davis'		Tim Meehan
1913	Abbeydorney		Run on a league basis		Maurice Treacy
1912	Tralee Mitchels	5-01	Ballyduff	5-00	Tom Costelleo
1911	Tralee Mitchels	5-03	Tralee Parnells	1-02	Paddy O'Mahoney
1910	Kilmoyley	4-04	Kenmare	0-02	Tim Meehan
1909	Not held				
1908	Tralee Mitchels	2-10	Kilmoyley	0-06	Dan Mullins
1907	Kilmoyley	1-00	Lixnaw	0-01	Pat Meehan
1906	Not held				
1905	Kilmoyley		Run on league basis		Tim Meehan
1904	Tralee Celtic	2-10	Kenmare	0-05	Paddy Guerin
1903	Tralee Celtic	2-05	Kilmoyley	1-00	Chris Horan
1902	Kenmare	2-02	Tralee Celtic	0-03	George Maybury
1901	Kilmoyley	2-09	Lixnaw	1-04	Patsy O'Rourke
1900	Kilmoyley A	3-07	Abbeydorney B	1-02	Patsy O'Rourke
1898-99	Not held				
1897	No record of championship				John Ban McCarthy (Lixnaw)
1896	Abbeydorney	1-03	Lixnaw	0-04	Davy Fitzgerald
1895	Kilmoyley	1-10	Kenmare	0-03	Jack W. Quane
1894	Kilmoyley	3-07	Lixnaw	1-04	John Gurnett
1893	Abbeydorney	W/O	Kilmoyley		Davy Fitzgerald
1892	Kilmoyley	W/O	Ballyduff		Jack W. Quane
1891	Ballyduff	1-00	Kilmoyley	0-02	John O'Mahony
1890	Kilmoyley	2-02	Ballyduff	0-00	Jack W. Quane
1889	Kenmare	1-00	Kilmoyley	0-03	Lawrence Egan

== Team records and statistics ==
=== Teams ===
==== By decade ====
The most successful team of each decade, judged by number of Kerry Senior Hurling Championship titles, is as follows:

- 1890s: 4 for Kilmoyley (1890-92-94-95)
- 1900s: 4 for Kilmoyley (1900-01-05-07)
- 1910s: 2 each for Kilmoyley (1910–14), Tralee Mitchels (1911-12) and Tralee Parnells (1918–19)
- 1920s: 2 for Austin Stacks (as Rock Street) (1928–29)
- 1930s: 2 for Kilflynn Pearses (1938–39)
- 1940s: 5 for Crotta O'Neill's (1941-43-44-45-47)
- 1950s: 3 each for Kilgarvan (1953-56-58) and Ballyduff (1955-57-59)
- 1960s: 4 for Ballyduff (1960-61-65-66)
- 1970s: 5 for Ballyduff (1972-73-76-77-78)
- 1980s: 4 for Causeway (1980-81-82-87)
- 1990s: 4 for Ballyduff (1991-93-94-95)
- 2000s: 6 for Kilmoyley (2001-02-03-04-08-09)
- 2010s: 4 for Ballyduff (2010-11-12-17)
- 2020s: 3 for Abbeydorney (2024-26)

=== Gaps ===
Longest gaps between successive championship titles:

- 64 years: Ballyduff (1891–1955)
- 61 years: Abbeydorney (1913–1974)
- 55 years: Crotta O'Neill's (1968–2023)
- 50 years: Abbeydorney (1974–2024)
- 47 years: Causeway (1932–1979)
- 46 years: Ballyheigue (1946–1992)
- 40 years: Kenmare (1902–1942)
- 34 years: Kilmoyley (1914–1948)
- 30 years: Kilmoyley (1971–2001)
- 29 years: Lixnaw (1954–1983)
- 23 years: St Brendan's, Ardfert (1990–2013)
- 21 years: Causeway (1998–2019)
- 20 years: Lixnaw (1934-1954)

==== Active gaps ====
Longest active gaps since last championship title:

- 107 year: Tralee Parnells (1919–present)
- 84 years: Kenmare (1942–present)
- 68 years: Kilgarvan (1958–present)
- 26 years: Ballyheigue (2000–present)

== See also ==
- Kerry Senior Football Championship
- Munster Intermediate Club Hurling Championship
- Kerry Intermediate Hurling Championship
