= Ballyduff GAA (Kerry) =

Gaelic games club in County Kerry, Ireland

Ballyduff G.A.A.
- C.L.G. An Bhaile Dhuibh
- Founded: 1880s
- County: Kerry
- Colours: Green & White
- Grounds: Ballyduff
- Coordinates: 52°27′04.51″N 9°40′13.20″W

Playing kits
Standard colours

Senior Club Championships
	All Ireland	Munster champions	Kerry champions
Hurling:	1	1	25

Ballyduff G.A.A. is a Gaelic Athletic Association club in Ballyduff, County Kerry, Ireland. The club fields both hurling and Gaelic football teams. The club won the All-Ireland Senior Hurling Championship Final in 1891.

== History ==
=== All Ireland Champions ===
Ballyduff won the All-Ireland Senior Hurling Championship in 1891. They beat Wexford side Crossabeg 2–04 to 1–05 in the final. They beat Limerick's Treaty Stone in the Munster Final by 1–02 to 1-01. The team was trained by James McDonnell. This is the only time that the title was won by a Kerry team.

==== All-Ireland Winning Team ====
John Mahony, (Ballyduff) (Capt.); Maurice Fitzmaurice; (Ahabeg) Maurice Kelly, (Ahabeg) John Murphy, (Ahabeg) Jack O'Sullivan, (Ballyduff) Paddy Carr O'Carroll, (Ballyduff) Pat Wynne, (Ballyduff) Jim McDonnell, (Ballyduff) Michael O'Sullivan, (Ballyduff) James Crowley, (Ballyduff) Frank Crowley, (Ballyduff) Pat O'Rourke, (Kilmoyley) Thade Eugene McCarthy, (Kilmoyley) Thade Donal McCarthy, (Ardfert) Michael McCarthy, (Ardfert) Michael Riordan, (Ardfert) Richard Kissane, (Ballyduff) Pat Quane, (Kilmoyley) Jackeen Quane, (Kilmoyley) Michael Kirby, (Kilmoyley) Tom Dunne, (Ballyduff).

Subs: J Murphy, (Dromartin) Pat Flanagan, (Ballyduff) Willie O'Connell, (Ballinorig) James Pierce, (Rahela) was unable to travel.

Ballyduff have won the County Senior Championship more times than any other team winning 25 times the last in 2017 when they beat Lixnaw in a reply on a scoreline of 4:13-1:19 in the final.

=== The Boys From Ballyduff ===
This song was written by P.J. Sheehy on the occasion of the Ballyduff/Crossabeg All-Ireland Hurling final in 1891. Patrick Sheehy was grandfather of Sean Sheehy who won championship medals with Ballyduff in 1972 and 1973, and great-grandfather of Tomas O'Sullivan who won championship medals with Ballyduff in 1988 and 1989.

Just a mile or thereabouts,

From the lordly Shannon mouth,

There's a spot to which none other I'd compare;

It's a village, not a town,

Though her sons have gained renown,

For the Boys from Ballyduff are always there.

== Roll of honour ==
=== Hurling ===
- All-Ireland Senior Hurling Championship 1:
  - 1891
- Munster Senior Hurling Championship 1:
  - 1891
- Kerry Senior Hurling Championship 25:
  - 1891, 1955, 1957, 1959, 1960, 1961, 1965, 1966, 1972, 1973, 1976, 1977, 1978, 1984, 1988, 1989, 1991, 1993, 1994, 1995, 2006, 2010, 2011, 2012, 2017
- Munster Intermediate Club Hurling Championship Runners-up
  - 2011, 2012
- Kerry Minor Hurling Championship 10:
  - 1972, 1973, 1975, 1994, 1996, 1998, 2001, 2003, 2020, 2021
- Kerry Under-21 hurling championship 4:
  - 2000, 2001, 2010, 2013
- North Kerry Senior Hurling Championships 14:
  - 1966, 1970, 1972, 1974, 1975, 1980, 1989, 1991, 1993, 1994, 1997, 2000, 2004, 2006, 2017

=== Football ===
- North Kerry Senior Football Championship 3:
  - 1994, 2005, 2006
- Kerry Junior Football Championship 1:
  - 2019

== Notable players ==
- Mikey Boyle
- Pádraig Boyle
- Paud Costelloe
- Jack Goulding
- John Mahony
