= 2002 Kerry Senior Hurling Championship =

- Dates: 17 July – 29 September 2002
- Teams: 10
- Sponsor: AIB
- Champions: Kilmoyley (18th title); Ian Brick (captain); John Meyler (manager)
- Runners-up: Lixnaw; Pat Dowling (captain); Seán Flaherty (manager)

Tournament statistics
- Matches played: 15
- Goals scored: 54 (3.6 per match)
- Points scored: 332 (22.13 per match)
- Top scorer(s): Shane Brick (2-20); Mike Conway (1-23)

The 2002 Kerry Senior Hurling Championship was the 101st staging of the Kerry Senior Hurling Championship since its establishment by the Kerry County Board in 1889. The draw for the opening round fixtures took place on 9 April 2002. The championship ran from 17 July to 29 September 2002.

Kilmoyley were the defending champions.

The final was played on 29 September 2002 at Austin Stack Park in Tralee, between Kilmoyley and Lixnaw, in what was their first meeting in the final in 19 years. Kilmoyley won the match by 1–16 to 2–07 to claim an 18th championship title overall and a second title in succession.

Shane Brick and Mike Conway were the championship's joint-top scorers.

== Format change ==
Having previously operated using a straight knockout format, the championship introduced a "back door system" or second chance for defeated first round teams. All ten participating teams were drawn together in the first round, with the five defeated teams receiving a second chance. Four of these teams progressed to the second round, while one team received a bye to the quarter-finals.

== Results ==
=== First round ===
17 July 2002 First round	Ballyduff	7-11 - 2-11	Kenmare	J. P. O'Sullivan Park
	B O'Sullivan 2-7, A Boyle 2-1, K Boyle 2-0, G O'Brien 1-0, A O'Grady 0-1, L Boyle 0-1, A O'Sullivan 0-1.		M Foley 1-5, F O'Brien 1-1, S Regan 0-3, J Wharton 0-1, G O'Sullivan-Morgan 0-1.

20 July 2002 First round	Lixnaw	8-22 - 0-04	South Kerry	Austin Stack Park
	R Thornton 3-0, C Fitzmaurice 2-3, J Griffin 2-3, M Conway 1-6, T McKenna 0-3, J Maher 0-2, K Dowling 0-2, A Cronin 0-1, D McElligott 0-1, P Cronin 0-1.		J Dunphy 0-3, E Touhy 0-1.

20 July 2002 First round	Ballyheigue	2-13 - 3-10	Crotta O'Neill's	Austin Stack Park
	M Slattery 0-6, B O'Sullivan 1-2, M Lucid 1-1, J Griffin 0-1, N Flahive 0-1, D Casey 0-1, N Kilbride 0-1.		P McGrath 2-1, D Carney 1-3, P Cronin 0-4, M Keane 0-1, B Mahony 0-1.

21 July 2002 First round	Abbeydorney	0-10 - 1-17	Kilmoyley	Austin Stack Park
	B O'Donovan 0-6, I McCarthy 0-1.		S Brick 1-10, C Walsh 0-3, M Regan 0-2, P O'Sullivan 0-2.

21 July 2002 First round	St Brendan's	1-08 - 3-08	Causeway	Austin Stack Park
	P Hussey 0-5, C Flaherty 1-0, J Egan 0-1, P Healy 0-1, D Leen 0-1.		JM Dooley 2-5, S Goggin 1-1, C Dineen 0-1, S Harty 0-1.

30 July 2002 First round replay	Ballyheigue	1-05 - 0-13	Crotta O'Neill's	Austin Stack Park
	M Lucid 1-1, J Healy 0-1, B O'Sullivan 0-1, N Gilbride 0-1, WJ Leen 0-1.		P Cronin 0-4, D Carney 0-3, S Twomey 0-2, J O'Sullivan 0-1, B O'Mahony 0-1, J Edwards 0-1, M Keane 0-1.

=== Second round ===
2 August 2002 Second round	St Brendan's	3-07 - 2-09	Abbeydorney	Austin Stack Park
	J Egan 2-4, C Flaherty 1-0, S Flaherty 0-1, D Leen 0-1, D Clifford 0-1.		B Donovan 2-2, T Maunsell 0-3, I McCarthy 0-3, M Hannafin 0-1.

3 August 2022 Second round	Ballyheigue	1-13 - 1-11 (aet)	Kenmare	Austin Stack Park
	WJ Leen 0-6, J Casey 1-0, J Griffin 0-3, N Flahive 0-1, A Murphy 0-1, P O'Connor 0-1, K O'Sullivan 0-1.		M Foley 0-6, F O'Brien 1-0, J Wharton 0-2, P Randles 0-1, C Cremin 0-1, D O'Sullivan 0-1.

=== Quarter-finals ===
14 August 2002 Quarter-final	Ballyduff	0-14 - 2-06	Crotta O'Neill's	Austin Stack Park
	B O'Sullivan 0-6, M Hennessy 0-2, L Boyle 0-2, A Boyle 0-1, G O'Brien 0-1, P O'Rourke 0-1, D O'Connor 0-1.		P Cronin 0-5, M Keane 1-1, D Kearney 1-0.

16 August 2002 Quarter-final	Kilmoyley	2-27 - 1-07	South Kerry	FitzGerald Stadium
	O Diggins 1-5, B Brick 1-3, M Regan 0-4, C Walsh 0-4, R Gentleman 0-3, P O'Sullivan 0-2, M Collins 0-2, D Young 0-2, T Murnane 0-1, B Harris 0-1.		E Tuohy 1-2, T Harrington 0-2, G Moroney 0-2, S Morris 0-1.

17 August 2002 Quarter-final	Lixnaw	1-18 - 3-06	Causeway	Austin Stack Park
	M Conway 0-6, R Thornton 1-2, A Cronin 0-2, J Maher 0-2, K Dowling 0-2, T McKenna 0-2, P O'Connell 0-1, J Griffin 0-1.		JM Dooley 3-2, A Whyte 0-2, M Dillane 0-1, C Dineen 0-1.

18 August 2002 Quarter-final	Ballyheigue	0-13 - 2-04	St Brendan's	Austin Stack Park
	J Griffin 0-5, N Stack 0-3, D Casey 0-1, A Murphy 0-1, M Lucid 0-1, WJ Leen 0-1, N Gilbride 0-1.		M Casey 1-0, P Healy 1-0, J Egan 0-2, P Healy 0-2.

=== Semi-finals ===
6 September 2002 Semi-final	Lixnaw	1-14 - 0-07	Ballyduff	Austin Stack Park
	M Conway 0-8, C Fitzmaurice 1-1, K Dowling 0-3, R Thornton 0-1, J Maher 0-1.		B O'Sullivan 0-5, D O'Connor 0-1, J Bunyan 0-1.

14 September 2002 Semi-final	Kilmoyley	2-13 - 2-08	Ballyheigue	Austin Stack Park
	M Murnane 1-1, M Regan 1-1, P O'Sullivan 0-4, S Brick 0-4, C Walsh 0-1, B Brick 0-1, D Young 0-1.		M Slattery 1-5, J Healy 1-0, A Murphy 0-2, J Griffin 0-1.

=== Final ===
29 September 2002 Final	Kilmoyley	1-16 - 2-07	Lixnaw	Austin Stack Park
	S Brick 1-6, M Murnane 0-2, P O'Sullivan 0-2, B Brick 0-2, D Young 0-1, C Walsh 0-1, M Regan 0-1, R Gentleman 0-1.		T McKenna 2-1, M Conway 0-3, P O'Connell 0-2, J Maher 0-1.	Referee: P Sheehy (Causeway)

== Championship statistics ==
=== Top scorers ===
Overall

Rank	Player	County	Tally	Total	Matches	Average
1	Shane Brick	Kilmoyley	2-20	26	3	8.66
1	Mike Conway	Lixnaw	1-23	26	4	6.50
3	Bobby O'Sullivan	Ballyduff	2-18	24	3	8.00
4	John Mike Dooley	Causeway	5-07	22	2	11.00
5	Roibeárd Thornton	Lixnaw	4-03	15	3	5.00
6	Brian O'Donovan	Abbeydorney	2-08	14	2	7.00
6	Mike Foley	Kenmare	1-11	14	2	7.00
6	Mike Slattery	Ballyheigue	1-11	14	3	4.66
9	Cillian Fitzmaurice	Lixnaw	3-04	13	4	3.25
9	John Egan	St Brendan's	2-07	13	2	6.60
9	Pádraig Cronin	Crotta O'Neill's	0-13	13	3	4.66

Single game

Rank	Player	Club	Tally	Total	Opposition
1	Bobby O'Sullivan	Ballyduff	2-07	13	Kenmare
1	Shane Brick	Kilmoyley	1-10	13	Abbeydorney
3	John Mike Dooley	Causeway	3-02	11	Lixnaw
3	John Mike Dooley	Causeway	2-05	11	St Brendan's
5	John Egan	St Brendan's	2-04	10	Abbeydorney
6	Roibeárd Thornton	Lixnaw	3-00	9	South Kerry
6	Cillian Fitzmaurice	Lixnaw	2-03	9	South Kerry
6	John Griffin	Lixnaw	2-03	9	South Kerry
6	Mike Conway	Lixnaw	1-06	9	South Kerry
6	Shane Brick	Kilmoyley	1-06	9	Lixnaw
