= List of Kerry senior hurling team captains =

This article lists players who have captained the senior Kerry county hurling team in the Christy Ring Cup, Joe McDonagh Cup, the Munster Senior Hurling Championship and the All-Ireland Senior Hurling Championship.

== List of captains ==
Year	Player	Club	National titles
2001	Michael Slattery	Ballyheigue	
2002	James McCarthy	Kilmoyley	
2003	Ian Brick	Kilmoyley	
2004	Shane Brick	Kilmoyley	
2005	Colin Harris	Kilmoyley	
2006	Michael Conway	Lixnaw	
2007	Liam Boyle	Ballyduff	
2008	John Griffin	Lixnaw	
2009	Tom Murnane	Kilmoyley	
2010	Colin Harris	Ballincollig	
2011	Mikey Boyle	Ballyduff	Christy Ring Cup final winning captain
2012	Liam Boyle	Ballyduff	
2013	Paud Costelloe	Ballyduff	
2014	John Egan	St Brendan's, Ardfert	
2015	John Griffin	Lixnaw	Christy Ring Cup final winning captain
2016	Daniel Collins	Kilmoyley	
2017	Aiden McCabe	Kilmoyley	
2018	Pádraig Boyle	Ballyduff	
2019			
2020	Bryan Murphy	Causeway	
2021	Daniel Collins	Kilmoyley	
2022			
2023			
2024			
2025			
2026			
