= 2008 Kerry Senior Hurling Championship =

Annual hurling competition season

- Dates: 1 August – 19 October 2008
- Teams: 9
- Sponsor: AIB
- Champions: Kilmoyley (21st title); Tom Murnane (captain); Anthony Daly (manager)
- Runners-up: Causeway; Cyril Dineen (captain); Richard Keane (manager)

Tournament statistics
- Matches played: 15
- Goals scored: 38 (2.53 per match)
- Points scored: 335 (22.33 per match)
- Top scorer(s): John Mike Dooley (5-20)

The 2008 Kerry Senior Hurling Championship was the 107th staging of the Kerry Senior Hurling Championship since its establishment by the Kerry County Board in 1889. The competition ran from 1 August to 19 October 2008.

Lixnaw entered the championship as the defending champions, however, they were beaten by Causeway in a quarter-final replay.

The final was played on 19 October 2008 at Austin Stack Park in Tralee, between Kilmoyley and Causeway, in what was their second meeting in the final overall and a first final meeting in four years. Kilmoyley won the match by 2–18 to 0–08 to claim a record-equalling 21st championship title overall and a first title in four years.

Causeway's John Mike Dooley was the championship's top scorer with 5-20.

== Results ==
=== Preliminary round ===
1 August 2008 Preliminary round	South Kerry	0-05 - 5-25	Kilmoyley	FitzGerald Stadium
	G Egan 0-3, S Lacey 0-1, C Cremin 0-1.		M Regan 1-9, B Brick 2-3, P Regan 1-2, T Murnane 1-2, M Murnane 0-3, P O'Sullivan 0-2, J Fealy 0-2, S Young 0-1, I Brick 0-1.

=== Round 1 ===
1 August 2008 Round 1	Ballyheigue	1-11 - 1-22	Ballyduff	Austin Stack Park
	J Griffin 1-2, M Slattery 0-4, R Kenny 0-2, J Crean 0-1, T O'Connor 0-1, N Flahive 0-1.		B O'Sullivan 0-11, M Boyle 1-1, J Bunyan 0-4, L Boyle 0-3, P O'Grady 0-1, A Boyle 0-1, E Joy 0-1.

2 August 2008 Round 1	St Brendan's	1-13 - 2-07	Crotta O'Neill's	Austin Stack Park
	D Dineen 1-8, D Wallace 0-2, A Dineen 0-1, J Egan 0-1, F Wallace 0-1.		M Lynch 2-0, A Keane 0-4, C McElligott 0-2, M Lynch 0-1.

2 August 2008 Round 1	Abbeydorney	0-14 - 3-08	Causeway	Austin Stack Park
	B O'Donovan 0-8, D O'Connell 0-2, A Healy 0-1, T Maunsell 0-1, D Ryall 0-1, M Hanafin 0-1.		A Whyte 2-1, JM Dooley 1-2, S Goggin 0-2, F O'Carroll 0-1, Colm Harty 0-1, P Monson 0-1.

10 August 2008 Round 1	Lixnaw	0-08 - 3-11	Kilmoyley	Austin Stack Park
	M Conway 0-7, E Galvin 0-1.		B Brick 1-6, P Regan 1-0, E Sheehy 1-0, M Regan 0-2, P O'Sullivan 0-2, S Young 0-1.

=== Round 2A ===
8 August 2008 Round 2A	Ballyduff	3-13 - 2-03	Causeway	Austin Stack Park
	B O'Sullivan 0-8, L Boyle 1-1, G O'Brien 1-1, J Bunyan 1-0, E Joy 0-1, B O'Grady 0-1, M Boyle 0-1.		A Whyte 1-1, S Goggin 1-1, C Dineen 0-1.

15 August 2008 Round 2A	Kilmoyley	1-15 - 2-09	St Brendan's	Austin Stack Park
	S Brick 1-5, M Murnane 0-3, B Brick 0-3, T Murnane 0-2, M Regan 0-2.		J Egan 1-3, D Dineen 0-5, A Dineen 1-1.

=== Round 2B ===
17 August 2008 Round 2B	Ballyheigue	1-10 - 0-10	Abbeydorney	Austin Stack Park
	M Slattery 1-4, J Griffin 0-2, J Crean 0-1, N Flahive 0-1, J Casey 0-1, D Walsh 0-1.		I Maunsell 0-6, D Ryann 0-2, PJ Keane 0-1, M Hanafin 0-1.

17 August 2008 Round 2B	Lixnaw	2-12 - 1-10	Crotta O'Neill's	Austin Stack Park
	M Conway 1-4, J Flaherty 1-2, R Galvin 0-2, J Griffin 0-1, P Lyons 0-1, E Galvin 0-1, M Quiker 0-1,		T Cronin 1-2, A Keane 0-4, R Nolan 0-2, P Twomey 0-1, S Twomey 0-1.

=== Quarter-finals ===
30 August 2008 Quarter-final	St Brendan's	0-15 - 0-12	Ballyheigue	Austin Stack Park
	D Dineen 0-7, S Flaherty 0-3, J Egan 0-2, D Wallace 0-1, A Kelly 0-1, A Dineen 0-1.		M Slattery 0-10, R Kenny 0-1, A Colgan 0-1.

6 September 2008 Quarter-final	Lixnaw	1-11 - 2-08	Causeway	Austin Stack Park
	M Conway 1-9, P Lyons 0-1, R Galvin 0-1.		JM Dooley 2-4, S Goggin 0-2, E Fitzgerald 0-1, C Flynn 0-1.

20 September 2008 Quarter-final replay	Lixnaw	1-07 - 2-07	Causeway	Austin Stack Park
	M Conway 1-5, R Galvin 0-1, J Griffin 0-1.		JM Dooley 2-4, Colm Harty 0-1, S Goggin 0-1, Conor Harty 0-1.

=== Semi-finals ===
28 September 2008 Semi-final	Kilmoyley	1-18 - 0-08	St Brendan's	Austin Stack Park
	S Brick 0-9, T Regan 1-1, T O'Sullivan 0-3, A Young 0-1, T McCarthy 0-1, M Murnane 0-1, B Brick 0-1, M Regan 0-1.		J Egan 0-3, D Dineen 0-3, J Galvin 0-1, K Dineen 0-1.

28 September 2008 Semi-final	Causeway	1-11 - 0-06	Ballyduff	Austin Stack Park
	JM Dooley 0-6, Colm Harty 1-2, Conor Harty 0-1, D Leahy 0-1, S Sheehan 0-1,		B O'Sullivan 0-4, T O'Rourke 0-1.

=== Final ===
19 October 2008 Final	Kilmoyley	2-18 - 0-08	Causeway	Austin Stack Park
	S Brick 1-10, S Young 0-4, M Murnane 1-0, M Regan 0-3, T Murnane 0-1.	Report	JM Dooley 0-4, JJ Canty 0-1, C Harty 0-1, C Dineen 0-1, S Goggin 0-1.

== Championship statistics ==
=== Top scorers ===
Overall

Rank	Player	County	Tally	Total	Matches	Average
1	John Mike Dooley	Causeway	5-20	35	5	7.00
2	Mike Conway	Lixnaw	3-25	34	4	8.50
3	Shane Brick	Kilmoyley	2-24	30	3	10.00
4	Darren Dineen	St Brendan's	1-23	26	4	6.50
5	Bobby O'Sullivan	Ballyduff	0-23	23	3	7.66

Single game

Rank	Player	Club	Tally	Total	Opposition
1	Shane Brick	Kilmoyley	1-10	13	Causeway
2	Michael Regan	Kilmoyley	1-09	12	South Kerry
2	Mike Conway	Lixnaw	1-09	12	Causeway
4	Darren Dineen	St Brendan's	1-08	11	Crotta O'Neill's
4	Bobby O'Sullivan	Ballyduff	1-08	11	Ballyheigue
6	John Mike Dooley	Causeway	2-04	10	Lixnaw
6	John Mike Dooley	Causeway	2-04	10	Lixnaw
6	Michael Slattery	Ballyheigue	0-10	10	St Brendan's
9	Billy Brick	Kilmoyley	2-03	9	South Kerry
9	Billy Brick	Kilmoyley	1-06	9	Lixnaw
9	Shane Brick	Kilmoyley	0-09	9	St Brendan's
