= 2003 Kerry Senior Hurling Championship =

- Dates: 18 July – 5 October 2003
- Teams: 9
- Sponsor: AIB
- Champions: Kilmoyley (19th title); Maurice Murnane (captain); John Meyler (manager)
- Runners-up: Lixnaw; Maurice McCarthy (captain); Roger Hussey (manager)

Tournament statistics
- Matches played: 15
- Goals scored: 43 (2.87 per match)
- Points scored: 342 (22.8 per match)
- Top scorer(s): Thomas O'Rourke (5-27)

The 2003 Kerry Senior Hurling Championship was the 102nd staging of the Kerry Senior Hurling Championship since its establishment by the Kerry County Board in 1889. The draw for the opening round fixtures took place in April 2003. The championship ran from 18 July to 5 October 2003.

Kilmoyley were the defending champions.

The final was played on 5 October 2003 at Austin Stack Park in Tralee, between Kilmoyley and Lixnaw, in what was their second consecutive meeting in the final. Kilmoyley won the match by 2–10 to 1–05 to claim a 19th championship title overall and a third title in succession.

Ballyduff's Thomas O'Rourke was the championship's top scorer with 5-27.

== Team changes ==
=== From championship ===
- Decided not to field a team
  - South Kerry

== Results ==
=== First round ===
18 July 2003 First round	Ballyduff	3-10 - 2-15	Lixnaw	Austin Stack Park
	B O'Sullivan 0-6, L Boyle 1-2, G O'Brien 1-0, M Hennessy 1-0, D o'Connor 0-1, G O'Grady 0-1.		M Conway 2-7, J Griffin 0-2, J Maher 0-2, C Fitzmaurice 0-2, R Galvin 0-1, R Thornton 0-1.

19 July 2003 First round	Causeway	3-14 - 2-08	Kenmare	FitzGerald Stadium
	JM Dooley 0-9, S Goggin 1-3, C Dineen 1-2, K Canty 1-0.		D O'Sullivan 2-0, E Tuohy 0-3, J Wharton 0-2, M Foley 0-2, S Regan 0-1.

20 July 2003 First round	Ballyheigue	0-12 - 1-11	St Brendan's	Austin Stack Park
	M Slattery 0-7, B O'Sullivan 0-3, J Griffin 0-1, E Flahive 0-1.		J Egan 0-9, E Corridan 1-0, S Flaherty 0-1, N Clifford 0-1.

20 July 2003 First round	Crotta O'Neill's	0-15 - 0-18	Abbeydorney	Austin Stack Park
	T Cronin 0-4, S Twomey 0-4, C McElligott 0-3, P Cronin 0-3, JP McElligott 0-1.		T Fealy 0-7, B O'Donovan 0-6, I McCarthy 0-3, D Ryall 0-2.

=== Second round ===
26 July 2003 Second round	Kenmare	0-18 - 2-10	Crotta O'Neill's	Austin Stack Park
	M Foley 0-7, E Tuohy 0-3, D O'Sullivan 0-2, P Randles 0-2, J Wharton 0-2, P Healy 0-1, S Regan 0-1.		S Twomey 2-5, D Brady 0-1, TR McElligott 0-1, F O'Sullivan 0-1, P Culhane 0-1, JP McElligott 0-1.

26 July 2003 Second round	Ballyduff	1-11 - 1-17	Ballyheigue	Austin Stack Park
	T O'Rourke 1-2, M Hennessy 0-4, B O'Sullivan 0-3, G O'Brien 0-1, D O'Connor 0-1.		G Crean 1-3, B O'Sullivan 0-5, M Slattery 0-5, TB O'Connor 0-1, J Griffin 0-1, K O'Sullivan 0-1, D Casey 0-1.

=== Third round ===
1 August 2003 Third round	Crotta O'Neill's	1-05 - 3-18	Ballyduff	Austin Stack Park
	S Twomey 1-2, JP McElligott 0-2, P Culhane 0-1.		L Boyle 1-6, B O'Sullivan 0-6, G O'Brien 1-1, E Joy 1-0, T O'Rourke 0-3, D Slattery 0-1, D O'Connor 0-1.

=== Quarter-finals ===
7 August 2003 Quarter-final	Lixnaw	1-09 - 0-10	Ballyheigue	Austin Stack Park
	M Conway 0-7, R Galvin 1-0, E Galvin 0-1, J Griffin 0-1.		M Slattery 0-6, K O'Sullivan 0-2, N Kilbride 0-1, D Casey 0-1.

8 August 2003 Quarter-final	St Brendan's	0-15 - 2-06	Abbeydorney	Austin Stack Park
	J Egan 0-7, JP Leen 0-4, B o'Connell 0-1, D Leen 0-1, E Corridan 0-1, P Healy 0-1.		I Maunsell 2-1, T Fealy 0-2, D Ryall 0-1, I McCarthy 0-1, A O'Donovan 0-1.

10 August 2003 Quarter-final	Kilmoyley	3-24 - 2-05	Kenmare	Austin Stack Park
	S Brick 0-9, B Brick 2-1, M Murnane 0-5, E Sheehy 1-1, M Regan 0-3, O Diggin 0-3, D Young 0-1, J McCarthy 0-1.		M Foley 1-4, P Healy 1-0, S O'Regan 0-1.

13 August 2003 Quarter-final	Ballyduff	2-12 - 4-06	Causeway	Austin Stack Park
	T O'Rourke 1-9, J O'Carroll 1-0, D O'Connor 0-2, G O'Brien 0-1.		JM Dooley 3-1, C Dineen 1-1, S Goggin 0-2, JJ Canty 0-1, C Harty 0-1.

31 August 2003 Quarter-final replay	Ballyduff	2-10 - 1-10	Causeway	Austin Stack Park
	T O'Rourke 2-5, B O'Sullivan 0-3, L Boyle 0-1, G O'Grady 0-1.		JM Dooley 1-4, JJ Canty 0-2, C Dineen 0-1, S Harty 0-1, D Leahy 0-1, S Goggin 0-1.

=== Semi-finals ===
30 August 2003 Semi-final	Lixnaw	2-08 - 0-06	St Brendan's	Austin Stack Park
	R Galvin 2-1, M Conway 0-6, P Galvin 0-1.		J Egan 0-4, J O'Halloran 0-1, P Flaherty 0-1.

7 September 2003 Semi-final	Kilmoyley	1-13 - 1-11	Ballyduff	Austin Stack Park
	S Brick 1-6, R Gentleman 0-3, C Harris 0-2, M Murnane 0-1, M Regan 0-1.		T O'Rourke 1-8, B O'Grady 0-2, L Boyle 0-1.

=== Final ===
5 October 2003 Final	Kilmoyley	2-10 - 1-05	Lixnaw	Austin Stack Park
	S Brick 1-4, O Diggin 1-2, C Walsh 0-2, M Regan 0-2.		M Conway 1-3, T McKenna 0-1, E Fitzmaurice 0-1.	Referee: B Dunne (Ballyheigue)

== Championship statistics ==
=== Top scorers ===
Overall

Rank	Player	County	Tally	Total	Matches	Average
1	Thomas O'Rourke	Ballyduff	5-27	42	5	8.40
2	Mike Conway	Lixnaw	3-23	32	4	8.00
3	John Mike Dooley	Causeway	4-14	26	3	8.66
4	Shane Brick	Kilmoyley	2-19	25	3	8.33
5	Seán Twomey	Crotta O'Neill's	3-11	20	3	6.66
5	John Egan	St Brendan's	0-20	20	3	6.66
7	Michael Slattery	Ballyheigue	0-18	18	3	6.00
7	Bobby O'Sullivan	Ballyduff	0-18	18	4	4.50
9	Liam Boyle	Ballyduff	2-10	16	6	2.66
9	Mike Foley	Kenmare	1-13	16	3	5.33

Single game

Rank	Player	Club	Tally	Total	Opposition
1	Mike Conway	Lixnaw	2-07	13	Ballyduff
2	Thomas O'Rourke	Ballyduff	1-09	12	Causeway
3	Seán Twomey	Crotta O'Neill's	2-05	11	Kenmare
3	Thomas O'Rourke	Ballyduff	2-05	11	Causeway
3	Thomas O'Rourke	Ballyduff	1-08	11	Kilmoyley
6	John Mike Dooley	Causeway	3-01	10	Ballyduff
7	Liam Boyle	Ballyduff	1-06	9	Crotta O'Neill's
7	Shane Brick	Kilmoyley	1-06	9	Ballyduff
7	John Mike Dooley	Causeway	0-09	9	Kenmare
7	Shane Brick	Kilmoyley	0-09	9	Kenmare
7	John Egan	St Brendan's	0-09	9	Ballyheigue
