= 2007 Kerry Senior Hurling Championship =

Annual hurling competition season

- Dates: 8 August – 7 October 2007
- Teams: 9
- Sponsor: AIB
- Champions: Lixnaw (7th title); Pat Dowling (captain); Éamonn Cregan (manager)
- Runners-up: Kilmoyley; Billy Brick (captain); Anthony Day (manager)

Tournament statistics
- Matches played: 8
- Goals scored: 26 (3.25 per match)
- Points scored: 185 (23.13 per match)
- Top scorer(s): Michael Conway (3-15)

The 2007 Kerry Senior Hurling Championship was the 106th staging of the Kerry Senior Hurling Championship since its establishment by the Kerry County Board in 1889. The draw for the preliminary and quarter-final rounds took place on 2 July 2007. The championship ran from 8 August to 7 October 2007.

Ballyduff entered the championship as the defending champions, however, they were beaten by Kilmoyley in the quarter-finals.

The final was played on 7 October 2007 at Austin Stack Park in Tralee, between Lixnaw and Kilmoyley, in what was their first meeting in the final in four years. Lixnaw won the match by 1–12 to 2–06 to claim their seventh championship title overall and a first title in two years.

Lixnaw's Michael Conway was the championship's top scorer with 3–15.

== Results ==
=== Preliminary round ===
8 August 2007 Preliminary round	St Brendan's	1-20 - 1-07	South Kerry	Austin Stack Park
	J Egan 1-5, A Dineen 0-5, T Hanafin 0-5, T Mooloney 0-2, D Dineen 0-1, S Flaherty 0-1, C Flaherty 0-1.		P Randles 0-5, B D'Arcy 1-0, S Morris 0-1, J Bergin 0-1.

=== Quarter-finals ===
24 August 2008 Quarter-final	St Brendan's	1-17 - 4-13	Ballyheigue	Austin Stack Park
	J Egan (1-7, 1-0f), T Hannafin (0-7, 6f), D Dineen (0-2), D Wallace (0-1).	Report	B O'Sullivan (4-4, 1-1 ?65?s, 0-3f), J Griffin (0-3), J Crean (0-2), R Kenny (0-2, 1 sideline), N Stack (0-1), M Slattery (0-1).

25 August 2007 Quarter-final	Kilmoyley	2-12 - 0-07	Ballyduff	Austin Stack Park
	S Brick 0-5, B Brick 1-1, J McCarthy 1-0, I Brick 0-1, C Harris 0-1, M Murnane 0-1, T Murnane 0-1, P McCarthy 0-1, S Maunsell 0-1.		B O'Sullivan 0-4, G O'Brien 0-1, T O'Rourke 0-1, G O'Grady 0-1.

28 August 2007 Quarter-final	Lixnaw	2-17 - 1-11	Crotta O'Neill's	Austin Stack Park
	M Conway 2-4, J Flaherty 0-8, K Dowling 0-2, P Lyons 0-2, F Fitzmaurice 0-1.		A Keane 1-5, I McCarthy 0-4, C McElligott 0-1, D Galvin 0-1.

1 September 2007 Quarter-final	Abbeydorney	3-09 - 2-14	Causeway	Austin Stack Park
	K Dineen 1-1, K Hanafin 0-4, I Maunsell 0-4, B Sheehan 1-0, B O'Donovan 1-0.		JM Dooley 1-4, JJ Canty 1-2, C Harty 0-2, S Sheehan 0-2, C Flynn 0-2, C Dineen 0-1, F Carroll 0-1.

=== Semi-finals ===
9 September 2007 Semi-final	Kilmoyley	1-15 - 2-02	Ballyheigue	Austin Stack Park
	S Brick 1-7, M Murnane 0-3, C Harris 0-1, T Murnane 0-1, P McCarthy 0-1, B Brick 0-1, S Maunsell 0-1.		B O'Sullivan 2-0, J Casey 0-1, J Griffin 0-1.

9 September 2007 Semi-final	Lixnaw	1-15 - 2-08	Causeway	Austin Stack Park
	M Conway 1-5, J Flaherty 0-6, P Lyons 0-3, S Power 0-1.		JJ Canty 1-1, JM Dooley 0-4, A White 1-0, S Sheehan 0-1, C Harty 0-1, D Dineen 0-1.

=== Final ===
7 October 2007 Final	Lixnaw	1-12 - 2-06	Kilmoyley	Austin Stack Park
	M Conway 0-6, C Fitzmaurice 1-0, J Griffin 0-1, P Lyons 0-1, P Galvin 0-1, T Galvin 0-1, J Flaherty 0-1, E Galvin 0-1.		S Brick 0-5, J McCarthy 1-0, J Murnane 1-0, B Brick 0-1.

== Championship statistics ==
=== Top scorers ===
Overall

Rank	Player	County	Tally	Total	Matches	Average
1	Michael Conway	Lixnaw	3-15	24	3	8.00
2	Bobby O'Sullivan	Ballyheigue	6-04	22	2	11.00
3	Shane Brick	Kilmoyley	1-17	20	3	6.66
4	John Egan	St Brendan's	2-12	18	2	9.00
5	James Flaherty	Lixnaw	0-15	15	3	5.00

Single game

Rank	Player	Club	Tally	Total	Opposition
1	Bobby O'Sullivan	Ballyheigue	4-04	16	St Brendan's
2	Michael Conway	Lixnaw	2-04	10	Crotta O'Neill's
2	John Egan	St Brendan's	1-07	10	Ballyheigue
2	Shane Brick	Kilmoyley	1-07	10	Ballyheigue
5	Michael Conway	Lixnaw	1-05	8	Causeway
5	John Egan	St Brendan's	1-05	8	South Kerry
5	Andrew Keane	Crotta O'Neill's	1-05	8	Lixnaw
5	James Flaherty	Lixnaw	0-08	8	Crotta O'Neill's
9	John Mike Dooley	Causeway	1-04	7	Abbeydorney
9	Tim Hannafin	St Brendan's	0-07	7	Ballyheigue
