= 2001 Kerry Senior Hurling Championship =

100th staging of the Kerry Senior Hurling Championship since 1889

- Dates: 21 July – 30 September 2001
- Teams: 9
- Sponsor: AIB
- Champions: Kilmoyley (17th title); James McCarthy (captain); John Meyler (manager)
- Runners-up: Ballyheigue; Pat Harrington (captain); John Lucid (manager)

Tournament statistics
- Matches played: 8
- Goals scored: 16 (2 per match)
- Points scored: 163 (20.38 per match)
- Top scorer(s): Shane Brick (1-25)

The 2001 Kerry Senior Hurling Championship was the 100th staging of the Kerry Senior Hurling Championship since its establishment by the Kerry County Board in 1889. The championship draw took place on 4 April 2001. The championship ran from 21 July to 30 September 2001.

Ballyheigue were the defending champions.

The final was played on 30 September 2001 at Austin Stack Park in Tralee, between Kilmoyley and Ballyheigue, in what was their third meeting in the final overall and a first final meeting in 53 years. Kilmoyley won the match by 2–08 to 2–07 to claim their 17th championship title overall and a first title in 30 years.

Kilmoyley's Shane Brick was the championship's top scorer with 1-25.

== Results ==
=== Preliminary round ===
21 July 2001 Preliminary round	Lixnaw	2-09 - 2-15	Kilmoyley	Austin Stack Park
	M Conway 1-4, P Galvin 1-1, J Griffin 0-2, E Galvin 0-1, A Cronin 0-1.		R Gentleman 1-2, S Brick 0-5, D Young 1-1, M Regan 0-4, O Diggin 0-1, C Harris 0-1, M Murnane 0-1.

=== Quarter-finals ===
20 July 2001 Quarter-final	Crotta O'Neill's	1-09 - 3-14	Ballyheigue	Austin Stack Park
	D Kearney 1-3, B O'Mahony 0-3, P Cronin 0-2, S Twomey 0-1.		B O'Sullivan 2-1, M Slattery 0-7, J Healy 1-2, E O'Sullivan 0-1, A Murphy 0-1, K O'Sullivan 0-1, J Griffin 0-1.

15 August 2001 Quarter-final	St Brendan's	0-08 - 1-08	South Kerry	Austin Stack Park
	P Hussey 0-4, J Egan 0-2, S Flaherty 0-1, C Flaherty 0-1.		M Foley 1-4, TP O'Connor 0-2, J Dunphy 0-1, J Wharton 0-1.

19 August 2001 Quarter-final	Causeway	0-08 - 0-11	Abbeydorney	Austin Stack Park
	JM Dooley 0-3, S Harty 0-2, JJ Canty 0-2, C Harty 0-1.		I Maunsell 0-5, K Hanafin 0-1, M Hanafin 0-1, L McCarthy 0-1, T Maunsell 0-1, L O'Sullivan 0-1, B O'Donovan 0-1.

19 August 2001 Quarter-final	Ballyduff	0-10 - 0-13	Kilmoyley	Austin Stack Park
	B O'Sullivan 0-4, P O'Rourke 0-2, D O'Connor 0-2, A O'Grady 0-1, M Hennessy 0-1.		S Brick 0-8, M Regan 0-2, O Diggins 0-1, C Walsh 0-1, R Gentleman 0-1.

=== Semi-finals ===
31 August 2001 Semi-final	Ballyheigue	0-10 - 0-07	Abbeydorney	Austin Stack Park
	B O'Sullivan 0-5, M Slattery 0-4, E Flahive 0-1.		I McCarthy 0-2, B Donovan 0-2, A Healy 0-1, K Hannafin 0-1, T Maunsell 0-1.

1 September 2001 Semi-final	South Kerry	0-07 - 3-19	Kilmoyley	Austin Stack Park
	M Foley 0=5, P Randles 0-2.		R Gentleman 2-1, S Brick 0-7, M Regan 1-3, B Brick 0-4, C Walsh 0-2, S Griffin 0-2.

=== Final ===
30 September 2001 Final	Kilmoyley	2-08 - 2-07	Ballyheigue	Austin Stack Park
	S Brick 1-5, B Brick 1-0, O Diggins 0-1, C Walsh 0-1, M Regan 0-1.		M Slattery 0-7, J Healy 1-0, A Murphy 1-0.	Referee: J Hennessy (Ballyduff)

== Championship statistics ==
=== Top scorers ===
Overall

Rank	Player	County	Tally	Total	Matches	Average
1	Shane Brick	Kilmoyley	1-25	28	4	7.00
2	Mike Slattery	Ballyheigue	0-18	18	3	6.00
3	Richard Gentleman	Kilmoyley	3-04	13	3	4.33
3	Micheál Regan	Kilmoyley	1-10	13	4	3.25
5	Bobby O'Sullivan	Ballyheigue	2-06	12	3	4.00
5	Mike Foley	South Kerry	1-09	12	2	6.00

Single game

Rank	Player	Club	Tally	Total	Opposition
1	Shane Brick	Kilmoyley	1-05	8	Ballyheigue
1	Shane Brick	Kilmoyley	0-08	8	Ballyduff
3	Bobby O'Sullivan	Ballyheigue	2-01	7	Crotta O'Neill's
3	Richard Gentleman	Kilmoyley	2-01	7	South Kerry
3	Mike Conway	Lixnaw	1-04	7	Kilmoyley
3	Mike Foley	South Kerry	1-04	7	St Brendan's
3	Shane Brick	Kilmoyley	0-07	7	South Kerry
3	Mike Slattery	Ballyheigue	0-07	7	Kilmoyley
3	Mike Slattery	Ballyheigue	0-07	7	Crotta O'Neill's
10	David Kearney	Crotta O'Neill's	1-03	6	Ballyheigue
10	Micheál Regan	Kilmoyley	1-03	6	South Kerry
