= 2004 Kerry Senior Hurling Championship =

- Dates: 16 July – 3 October 2004
- Teams: 9
- Sponsor: AIB
- Champions: Kilmoyley (20th title); Shane Brick (captain); John Meyler (manager)
- Runners-up: Causeway; Shane Harty (captain); Francie Dineen (manager)

Tournament statistics
- Matches played: 10
- Goals scored: 39 (3.9 per match)
- Points scored: 224 (22.4 per match)
- Top scorer(s): John Mike Dooley (3-24)

The 2004 Kerry Senior Hurling Championship was the 103rd staging of the Kerry Senior Hurling Championship since its establishment by the Kerry County Board in 1889. The draw for the opening round fixtures took place on 25 March 2004. The championship ran from 16 July to 5 October 2004.

Kilmoyley were the defending champions.

The final was played on 3 October 2004 at Austin Stack Park in Tralee, between Kilmoyley and Causeway, in what was their first ever meeting in the final. Kilmoyley won the match by 2–15 to 2–09 to claim a record-equalling 20th championship title overall and a fourth title in succession.

Causeway's John Mike Dooley was the championship's top scorer with 3-24.

== Results ==
=== First round ===
16 July 2004 First round	Kenmare	0-11 - 1-18	Abbeydorney	Lewis Road
	E Touhy 0-4, S Regan 0-3, TP O'Connor 0-2, D O'Sullivan 0-1, S Morris 0-1.		B O'Donovan 1-3, I McCarthy 0-5, D Ryall 0-3, B Sheehan 0-3, A Healy 0-2, T Maunsell 0-1, K Hannafin 0-1.

17 July 2004 First round	Causeway	1-09 - 0-13	Crotta O'Neill's	Austin Stack Park
	C Dineen 1-1, J O'Neill 0-3, E Fitzgerald 0-2, S Harty 0-1, S Sheehan 0-1, F O'Carroll 0-1.		S Twomey 0-9, A Keane 0-2, D Brady 0-1, C McElligott 0-1.

=== Second round ===
24 July 2004 Second round	Kenmare	2-09 - 3-18	Causeway	FitzGerald Stadium
	P Randles 2-4, S Regan 0-2, D O'Sullivan 0-1, J Wharton 0-1, D Randles 0-1.		C Dineen 1-6, JM Dooley 0-7, E O'Neill 1-2, S Goggin 1-2, E Fitzgerald 0-1.

=== Quarter-finals ===
6 August 2004 Quarter-final	Ballyduff	2-08 - 2-17	Kilmoyley	Austin Stack Park
	L Boyle 1-0, M Boyle 1-0, M Hennessy 0-3, T O'Rourke 0-2, B O'Sullivan 0-1, E Joy 0-1, J Bunyan 0-1.		S Brick 0-12, S Maunsell 2-0, R Genteman 0-2, D Young 0-1, J Murnane 0-1, M Regan 0-1.

7 August 2004 Quarter-final	Crotta O'Neill's	1-08 - 3-09	Ballyheigue	Austin Stack Park
	S Twomey 0-6, A Keane 1-0, B O'Mahony 0-1, T Cronin 0-1.		M Slattery 1-4, N Stack 1-1, D Walsh 1-0, WJ Leen 0-3, B O'Sullivan 0-1.

13 August 2004 Quarter-final	Abbeydorney	3-11 - 4-11	St Brendan's	Austin Stack Park
	T Maunsell 3-0, I McCarthy 0-7, B O'Donovan 0-4.		J Egan 1-6, S Flaherty 1-1, B Blackwell 1-0, E Corridan 0-1, D Wallace 0-1, S Synnott 0-1, J Best 0-1.

15 August 2004 Quarter-final	Causeway	1-12 - 0-08	Lixnaw	Austin Stack Park
	JM Dooley 1-6, C Dineen 0-3, S Sheehan 0-3.		M Conway 0-3, J Griffin 0-2, E Galvin 0-1, M Cronin 0-1, R Galvin 0-1.

=== Semi-finals ===
5 September 2004 Semi-final	Ballyheigue	3-07 - 2-12	Causeway	Austin Stack Park
	M Slattery 2-6, B O'Sullivan 1-1.		JM Dooley 1-5, S Harty 0-4, S Sheehan 1-0, C Dineen 0-2, F O'Carroll 0-1.

5 September 2004 Semi-final	Kilmoyley	4-10 - 3-09	St Brendan's	Austin Stack Park
	M Murnane 1-3, S Brick 1-3, D Young 1-0, C Walsh 1-0, R Gentleman 0-1, T Murnane 0-1, S Fitzgerald 0-1, M Regan 0-1.		D Dineen 2-0, J Egan 0-6, E Corridan 1-0, S Synnott 0-1, D Wallace 0-1, S Flaherty 0-1.

=== Final ===
3 October 2004 Final	Kilmoyley	2-15 - 2-09	Causeway	Austin Stack Park
	S Brick 2-6, C Walsh 1-2, T Murnane 0-3, M Regan 0-2, R Gentleman 0-1, D Young 0-1.		JM Dooley 1-6, S Goggin 1-0, C Harty 0-1, F O'Carroll 0-1, C Dineen 0-1.

== Championship statistics ==
=== Top scorers ===
Overall

Rank	Player	County	Tally	Total	Matches	Average
1	John Mike Dooley	Causeway	3-24	33	4	8.25
2	Shane Brick	Kilmoyley	3-21	30	3	10.00
3	Michael Slattery	Ballyheigue	3-10	19	2	9.50
3	Cyril Dineen	Causeway	2-13	19	5	3.80
5	John Egan	St Brendan's	1-12	15	2	7.50
5	Seán Twomey	Crotta O'Neill's	0-15	15	2	7.50
7	Ian McCarthy	Abbeydorney	0-12	12	2	6.00
8	Tony Maunsell	Abbeydorney	3-01	10	2	5.00
8	Patrick Randles	Kenmare	2-04	10	2	5.00
8	Brian O'Donovan	Abbeydorney	1-07	10	2	5.00

Single game

Rank	Player	Club	Tally	Total	Opposition
1	Michael Slattery	Ballyheigue	2-06	12	Causeway
1	Shane Brick	Kilmoyley	2-06	12	Causeway
1	Shane Brick	Kilmoyley	0-12	12	Ballyduff
4	Patrick Randles	Kenmare	2-04	10	Causeway
5	Tony Maunsell	Abbeydorney	3-00	9	St Brendan's
5	John Egan	St Brendan's	1-06	9	Abbeydorney
5	John Mike Dooley	Causeway	1-06	9	Lixnaw
5	John Mike Dooley	Causeway	1-06	9	Kilmoyley
5	Cyril Dineen	Causeway	1-06	9	Kenmare
5	Seán Twomey	Crotta O'Neill's	0-09	9	Causeway
