= John Griffin (hurler) =

Irish hurler & Gaelic footballer (born 1983)

Personal information
- Native name: Seán Ó Grifín (Irish)
- Nickname: Tweek
- Born: 1983 (age 42–43) Lixnaw, County Kerry, Ireland
- Occupation: Primary school teacher
- Height: 5 ft 9 in (175 cm)

Sport
- Sport: Hurling
- Position: Midfield
Clubs
- Years: Club
- 2001–2020 2001–2013 2021: Lixnaw; Finuge; Blarney
Club titles
- Kerry titles: 4
College
- Years: College
- Cork Institute of Technology
Inter-county
- Years: County
- 2003–2017: Kerry
Inter-county titles
- NHL: 0
- All Stars: 0

John Griffin (born 1983) is an Irish hurling manager and former player who has been manager of the Kerry senior hurling team since 2024. He played for club sides Lixnaw, Finuge and Blarney and was also a member of the Kerry senior hurling team.

== Early life ==
Born and raised in Lixnaw, County Kerry, Griffin first played hurling and Gaelic football as a schoolboy with Causeway Comprehensive. He lined out in all grades in both codes and was a member of the school's senior team that won a Munster vocational school's hurling–football double in 2001. He also captained the Kerry vocational schools' team to a 0–14 to 0–8 defeat by Donegal in the 2002 All-Ireland final. Griffin later lined out with the Cork Institute of Technology and captained the team in the Fitzgibbon Cup.

== Club career ==
Griffin began his club career at juvenile and underage levels with Lixnaw, winning three successive Kerry U21HC titles from 2002 to 2004. By that stage he had also progressed to adult level with Lixnaw, while also lining out as a Gaelic footballer with sister club Finuge. Griffin won a Kerry JFC title in 2002, before claiming a Munster Club JFC medal after a 0–14 to 0–11 defeat of Kiskeam in the final.

Griffin claimed a second set of Kerry and Munster Club JFC medals in 2004. He later won an All-Ireland Club JFC medal after a 1–14 to 0–06 defeat of Stewartstown Harps in the 2005 All-Ireland club final. Griffin ended the 2005 season by winning his first Kerry SHC title after a 0–17 to 0–6 defeat of Abbeydorney in a final replay. He added a second Kerry SHC medal to his collection after a 1–12 to 2–6 win over Kilmoyley in the 2007 final.

Griffin was part of the Finuge football team that beat Spa by 1–12 to 0–12 to win the Kerry IFC title in 2012. A Munster Club IFC title followed after a defeat of St Vincent's; however, Finuge were subsequently beaten by Cookstown Fr Rock's in the 2013 All-Ireland club final.

The second half of Griffin's club career saw him concentrate solely on hurling. He claimed further Kerry SHC honours after defeats of Kilmoyley in 2014 and 2018. He brought his 20-year club career to an end after transferring to the Blarney club in Cork in 2021.

== Inter-county career ==
Griffin began his inter-county career with Kerry as part of the minor team that beat Carlow to win the All-Ireland MBHC title in 2001. He immediately progressed to the under-21 team and was part of the Kerry team that again defeated Carlow to take the All-Ireland U21BHC title in 2002. Griffin made his senior team debut in a National Hurling League defeat of Meath in 2003.

After several seasons without success, Griffin claimed his first senior silverware in 2010 when Kerry won Division 3A of the National League after a 2–18 to 1–15 defeat of Derry in the final. He was later part of the Kerry team beaten by Westmeath by a point in the 2010 Christy Ring Cup final. Griffin collected a winners' medal in that competition a year later after Kerry's 2–21 to 2–8 win over Wicklow in the 2011 final.

Griffin made his third Christy Ring Cup final appearance in four seasons in 2013; however, a late goal saw Down win by 3–16 to 2–17. He claimed further National League honours in 2014 when Kerry beat Carlow by 3–16 to 3–13 to take the Division 2A title. Griffin again lost out on further Christy Ring Cup honours following a 4–18 to 2–22 defeat by Kildare in the 2014 final.

Griffin took over the captaincy of the team for the 2015 season. He later won a second consecutive Division 2A title after a 5–17 to 3–17 defeat of Westmeath. Griffin's tenure as captain also saw Kerry claim a second Christy Ring Cup title after a 1–20 to 0–12 defeat of Derry in the 2015 final.

Griffin announced his inter-county retirement in May 2017.

== International career ==
Griffin earned his first call-up to the Ireland national hurling team for the annual Shinty–Hurling International Series in 2006, however, Scotland won the series. He made a number of appearances for the international team over the following few years before claiming a winners' medal in 2009 after Ireland's 1–11 to 1–8 defeat of Scotland.

== Management career ==
Griffin's coaching career began on the club scene in Cork. He served in various capacities with club sides Erin's Own, Ballygarvan and Carrigtwohill, higher education side MTU Cork and divisional side Imokilly. He was also a goalkeeping coach with the Cork senior hurling team under manager Kieran Kingston in 2022.

Griffin was appointed manager of the Kerry senior hurling team in August 2024.

== Honours ==
Causeway Comprehensive

- Munster Vocational Schools' Senior Football Championship: 2001
- Munster Vocational Schools' Senior Football Championship: 2001

Lixnaw

- Kerry Senior Hurling Championship: 2005, 2007, 2014, 2018
- Kerry Under-21 Hurling Championship: 2002, 2003, 2004

Finuge

- Munster Intermediate Club Football Championship: 2012
- Kerry Intermediate Football Championship: 2012
- All-Ireland Junior Club Football Championship: 2005
- Munster Junior Club Football Championship: 2002, 2004
- Kerry Junior Football Championship: 2002, 2004

Kerry

- Christy Ring Cup: 2011, 2015 (c)
- National League Division 2A: 2014, 2015 (c)
- National League Division 3A: 2010
- All-Ireland Under-21 B Hurling Championship: 2002
- All-Ireland Minor B Hurling Championship: 2001

Ireland

- Shinty/Hurling International Series: 2009

Sporting positions
Preceded by Liam Boyle	Kerry senior hurling team captain 2008	Succeeded by Tom Murnane
Preceded by John Egan	Kerry senior hurling team captain 2015	Succeeded by Daniel Collins
Preceded by Stephen Molumphy	Kerry senior hurling team manager 2024–	Succeeded by Incumbent
Achievements
Preceded by Niall Ó Muineacháin	Christy Ring Cup winning captain 2015	Succeeded by James Toher
