= 2005 Kerry Senior Hurling Championship =

Annual hurling competition season

- Dates: 5 August – 16 October 2005
- Teams: 9
- Sponsor: AIB
- Champions: Lixnaw (6th title); Fergus Fitzmaurice (captain); Johnny Conway (manager)
- Runners-up: Abbeydorney; Aidan Healy (captain); Timmy Weir (manager)

Tournament statistics
- Matches played: 11
- Goals scored: 40 (3.64 per match)
- Points scored: 239 (21.73 per match)
- Top scorer(s): Michael Conway (3-26)

The 2005 Kerry Senior Hurling Championship was the 104th staging of the Kerry Senior Hurling Championship since its establishment by the Kerry County Board in 1889. The draw for the opening round fixtures took place on 4 April 2005. The championship ran from 5 August to 16 October 2005.

Kilmoyley entered the championship as the defending champions, however, they were beaten by Ballyduff in the quarter-finals.

The final, a replay, was played on 16 October 2005 at Austin Stack Park in Tralee, between Lixnaw and Abbeydorney, in what was their third meeting in the final overall and a first final meeting in 51 years. Lixnaw won the match by 0–17 to 0–06 to claim their sixth championship title overall and a first title in six years.

Lixnaw's Michael Conway was the championship's top scorer with 3-26.

== Results ==
=== First round ===
5 August 2005 First round	Lixnaw	4-19 - 1-06	Kenmare	FitzGerald Stadium
	M Conway 1-6, J Flaherty 1-4, C Fitzmaurice 1-3, T Brosnan 1-0, P Lyons 0-2, P O'Connell 0-2, F Fitzmaurice 0-1, E Galvin 0-1.		P O'Brien 1-1, P Randles 0-3, B O'Grady 0-1, J Maye 0-1.

6 August 2005 First round	Abbeydorney	1-08 - 0-09	Crotta O'Neill's	Austin Stack Park
	I Maunsell 0-4, M Hannafin 1-0, T O'Connell 0-2, K Hannafin 0-1, N Roche 0-1.		A Keane 0-6, S Twomey 0-2, P Cronin 0-1.

=== Second round ===
19 August 2005 Second round	Kenmare	3-05 - 6-25	Crotta O'Neill's	FitzGerald Stadium
	J Wharton 1-2, G O'Sullivan 1-0, M O'Sullivan 1-0, D O'Sullivan 0-2, B O'Grady 0-1.		S Twomey 2-4, M Lynch 2-4, A Keane 0-9, JP McElligott 1-1, C McElligott 1-1, S Enright 0-2, F Cronin 0-1, T Culhane 0-1, F Keane 0-1, T Quille 0-1.

=== Quarter-finals ===
27 August 2005 Quarter-final	Causeway	1-11 - 0-10	Crotta O'Neill's	Austin Stack Park
	T Flynn 0-8, M Leahy 1-0, JM Dooley 0-2, C Dineen 0-1.		S Twomey 0-4, A Keane 0-3, C McElligott 0-2, S Enright 0-1.

2 September 2005 Quarter-final	Ballyduff	3-09 - 2-08	Kilmoyley	Austin Stack Park
	L Boyle 2-1, T O'Rourke 0-7, B O'Grady 1-0, G O'Brien 1-0.		S Brick 2-6, M Regan 0-1, B Brick 0-1.

3 September 2005 Quarter-final	Abbeydorney	2-10 - 3-02	St Brendan's	Austin Stack Park
	K Hannifin 2-1, I Maunsell 0-5 frees, M Hannifin 0-2, T O’Connell 0-2.	Report	A Kelly 2-0, S Griffin 1-0, J Egan 0-1, free, M Casey 0-1.

4 September 2005 Quarter-final	Lixnaw	0-16 - 2-08	Ballyheigue	Austin Stack Park
	M Conway 0-9 (0-7 frees), J Flaherty and J Griffin 0-2 each, M Corridan, F Fitzmaurice and C Fitzmaurice 0-1 each.	Report	M Slattery 0-5 (0-4 frees), N Stack 1-1, N Flahive 1-0, KO’Sullivan and A Lawlor 0-1 each.

=== Semi-finals ===
18 September 2005 Semi-final	Ballyduff	1-08 - 2-13	Abbeydorney	Austin Stack Park
	M Boyle 1-0, A Boyle 0-2, T O'Rourke 0-2 (0-1 free), B O'Sullivan 0-2 (0-1'65) M Hennessy and J Bunyan 0-1 each.	Report	I Maunsell 1-8 (1-7 frees), K Dineen 1-1, I McCarthy 0-2, K Hannifin and B Donovan 0-1 each.

18 September 2005 Semi-final	Causeway	4-08 - 3-22	Lixnaw	Austin Stack Park
	JM Dooley (3-0), T Flynn (0-5f), C Harty (0-2, 0-1 65), S Goggin (1-0), C Dineen (0-1).	Report	M Conway (2-7, 0-4f), K Dowling (0-5), C Fitzmaurice (1-4), F Fitzmaurice (0-2), J Griffin (0-1), P Lyons (0-1), R Thornton (0-1), J Flaherty (0-1).

=== Final ===
2 October 2005 Final replay	Lixnaw	1-11 - 2-08	Abbeydorney	Austin Stack Park
	M Corridan 1-0, M Conway 0-4 frees, C Fitzmaurice 0-3, J Griffin, F Fitzmaurice, J Flaherty, and P Galvin 0-1 each.	Report	D Ryall 1-1, K Hannafin 1-0, I McCarthy 0-3, I Maunsell 0-3 ( 0-2f, 0-1 '65), B Donovan 0-1.

=== Final replay ===
16 October 2005 Final replay	Lixnaw	0-17 - 0-06	Abbeydorney	Austin Stack Park
	P Galvin 0-5; E Galvin 0-3; J Flaherty 0-3f; F Fitzmaurice 0-2f; P Lyons 0-2; E Fitzmaurice, C Fitzmaurice 0-1 each.	Report	I Maunsell 0-4f; M Hannafin, I McCarthy 0-1 each.	Referee: M O'Connor (Limerick)

== Championship statistics ==
=== Top scorers ===
Overall

Rank	Player	County	Tally	Total	Matches	Average
1	Michael Conway	Lixnaw	3-26	35	4	8.75
2	Ian Maunsell	Abbeydorney	1-24	27	5	5.40
3	Cillian Fitzmaurice	Lixnaw	2-12	18	5	3.60
3	Andrew Keane	Crotta O'Neill's	0-18	18	3	6.00
5	Seán Twomey	Crotta O'Neill's	2-10	16	3	5.33
6	James Flaherty	Lixnaw	1-11	14	5	2.80
7	Tadhg Flynn	Causeway	0-13	13	2	6.50
8	Shane Brick	Kilmoyley	2-06	12	1	12.00
9	John Mike Dooley	Causeway	3-02	11	2	5.50
10	Matt Lynch	Crotta O'Neill's	2-04	10	3	3.33

Single game

Rank	Player	Club	Tally	Total	Opposition
1	Michael Conway	Lixnaw	2-07	13	Causeway
2	Shane Brick	Kilmoyley	2-06	12	Balyduff
3	Ian Maunsell	Abbeydorney	1-08	11	Balyduff
4	Seán Twomey	Crotta O'Neill's	2-04	10	Kenmare Shamrocks
4	Matt Lynch	Crotta O'Neill's	2-04	10	Kenmare Shamrocks
6	John Mike Dooley	Causeway	3-00	9	Lixnaw
6	Michael Conway	Lixnaw	1-06	9	Kenmare Shamrocks
6	Andrew Keane	Crotta O'Neill's	0-09	9	Kenmare Shamrocks
6	Michael Conway	Lixnaw	0-09	9	Ballyheigue
10	Tadhg Flynn	Causeway	0-08	8	Crotta O'Neill's
