= 2004 National Hurling League =

73rd season of the National Hurling League

League details
- Dates: 14 February – 9 May 2004
- Teams: 32

League champions
- Winners: Galway (8th win)
- Captain: Ollie Canning
- Manager: Conor Hayes

League runners-up
- Runners-up: Waterford
- Captain: Ken McGrath
- Manager: Justin McCarthy

Other division winners
- Division 2: Down
- Division 3: Sligo
- Division 3 Shield: Donegal

Offaly v. Dublin, 18 April 2004

The 2004 National Hurling League, known for sponsorship reasons as the Allianz National Hurling League, was the 73rd edition of the National Hurling League (NHL), an annual hurling competition for the GAA county teams. Galway won the league, beating Waterford in the final.

== Structure ==
=== Division 1 ===
There are 12 teams in Division 1, divided into 1A and 1B. Each team plays all the others in its group once, earning 2 points for a win and 1 for a draw.

- The top three in 1A and 1B advance to the Division 1 Final Group.
- The bottom three in 1A and 1B go into the Division 1 Relegation Group.

Each team in the Final Group plays the other three teams that it did not play in the first five games. The top two teams go into the NHL final – only points earned in these last three games count. Each team in the Relegation Group plays the other three teams that it did not play in the first five games. The bottom team is relegated – only points earned in these last three games count.

=== Division 2 ===
There are 10 teams in Division 2, divided into 2A and 2B. Each team plays all the others in its group once, earning 2 points for a win and 1 for a draw.

- The top three in 2A and 2B advance to the Division 2 Promotion Group.
- The bottom two in 2A and 2B go into the Division 2 Relegation Group.

Each team in the Promotion Group plays the other three teams that it did not play in the first four games. The top two teams go into the Division 2 final – only points earned in these last three games count. Final winners are promoted. Each team in the Relegation Group plays the other two teams that it did not play in the first four games. The bottom team is relegated – only points earned in these last two games count.

=== Division 3 ===
There are 10 teams in Division 3, divided into 3A and 3B. Each team plays all the others in its group once, earning 2 points for a win and 1 for a draw.

- The top three in 3A and 3B advance to the Division 3 Promotion Group.
- The bottom two in 3A and 3B go into the Division 3 Shield Group.

Each team in the Promotion Group plays the other three teams that it did not play in the first four games. The top two teams go into the Division 3 final – only points earned in these last three games count. Final winners are promoted. Each team in the Shield Group plays the other two teams that it did not play in the first four games. The top two play the Division 3 Shield Final.

== Overview ==
=== Division 1 ===
Galway won their first league title in four seasons, as 'the Westerners' recorded two defeats throughout the entire league. Waterford, who were league runners-up, suffered three defeats in the group stages before falling to Galway in the final.

Down at the other end of the table, Dublin and Antrim went through the initial group stages without a single victory. However, a relegation group of six teams resulted in Offaly ending up at the bottom and facing relegation for the following season.

== Division 1 ==
National Hurling League Division 1
- Season: 2004
- Champions: Galway; 9th National League title Captain: Ollie Canning; Manager: Conor Hayes
- Relegated: Offaly
- Matches: 49
- Top goalscorer: Eugene Cloonan (10-62)
- Biggest home win: Tipperary 5-23 - 0-13 Antrim (21 March 2004)
- Biggest away win: Waterford 2-12 - 6-17 Dublin (13 March 2004)
- Highest scoring: Kilkenny 3-31 - 3-7 Antrim (25 April 2004)
- All statistics correct as of 12 April 2017.

Kilkenny came into the season as defending champions of the 2003 season. Antrim entered Division 1 as the promoted team.

On 9 May 2004, Galway won the title following a 2-15 to 1-13 win over Waterford in the final. It was their first league title since 2000 and their 8th National League title overall.

Offaly, who were unlucky not to make the final group, were relegated from Division 1 after losing all of their group stage matches in the relegation group.

Galway's Eugene Cloonan was the Division 1 top scorer with 10-62.

=== Division 1A table ===
Pos	Team	Pld	W	D	L	Pts	Notes
1	Galway	5	4	0	1	8	Advanced to Group 1
2	Clare	5	4	0	1	8	Advanced to Group 1
3	Waterford	5	3	0	2	6	Advanced to Group 1
4	Kilkenny	5	3	0	2	6	Advanced to Group 2
5	Laois	5	1	0	4	2	Advanced to Group 2
6	Dublin	5	0	0	5	0	Advanced to Group 2

=== Group stage results ===
22 February 2004 Round 1	Dublin	2-6 - 1-14	Galway	Parnell Park, Donnycarney
	C Keaney 2-3, D Curtin 0-1, D Sweeney 0-1, T Moore 0-1.		E Cloonan 1-6, M Kerins 0-2, A Kerins 0-2, K Broderick 0-1, D Tierney 0-1, F Healy 0-1, D Hariman 0-1.	Referee: T McIntyre (Antrim)

22 February 2004 Round 1	Kilkenny	1-10 - 0-15	Waterford	Nowlan Park, Kilkenny
	E Brennan 1-0, H Shefflin 0-5, T Walsh 0-2, J Maher 0-2, J Fitzpatrick 0-1.		P Flynn 0-7, D Bennett 0-4, J Mullane 0-3, E Murphy 0-1.	Referee: D Kirwan (Cork)

22 February 2004 Round 1	Laois	1-11 - 3-14	Clare	O'Moore Park, Portlaoise
	D Cuddy 0-5, L Tynan 1-0, J Young 0-2, C Cuddy 0-1, J Fitzpatrick 0-1, C Coonan 0-1, D Culleton 0-1.		F Lohan 2-1, N Gilligan 1-3, D Forde 0-5, T Griffin 0-2, A Markham 0-2, C Lynch 0-1.	Referee: J Kelly (Wexford)

29 February 2004 Round 2	Galway	0-18 - 1-12	Kilkenny	Pearse Stadium, Salthill
	E Cloonan 0-12, D Hayes 0-3, M Kerins 0-1, D Forde 0-1, F Healy 0-1.		H Shefflin 0-7, J Hoyne 1-0, DJ Carey 0-2, M Comerford 0-1, T Walsh 0-1, J Maher 0-1.	Referee: P O'Connor (Limerick)

29 February 2004 Round 2	Waterford	0-25 - 3-11	Laois	Walsh Park, Waterford
	P Flynn 0-8, D Shanahan 0-6, J Mullane 0-3, D Bennett 0-3, S Prendergast 0-3, E Kelly 0-1, J Kennedy 0-1.		D Culleton 2-2, J Young 0-5, L Tynan 1-1, D Cuddy 0-2, T Fitzgerald 0-1.	Referee: J McDonnell (Tipperary)

29 February 2004 Round 2	Clare	3-13 - 2-13	Dublin	Cusack Park, Ennis
	A Markham 1-5, F Lohan 1-1, N Gilligan 1-0, D Forde 0-3, C Lynch 0-2, C Plunkett 0-1, D O’Connell 0-1.		D Curtin 0-8, S Martin 2-1, L Ryan 0-1, T Moore 0-1, R Fallon 0-1, K Flynn 0-1.	Referee: G Harrington (Cork)

13 March 2004 Round 3	Dublin	2-12 - 6-17	Waterford	Parnell Park, Donnycarney
	D Curtin 0-6, C Keaney 1-1, S Martin 1-0, D Sweeney 0-2, L Ryan 0-1; S Mullen 0-1, T Moore 0-1.		P O'Brien 3-2, P Flynn 1-4, S Ryan 0-5, J Mullane 1-1, D Shanahan 1-0, D Bennett 0-3; B Phelan 0-1, J Kennedy 0-1.	Referee: S Roche (Tipperary)

14 March 2004 Round 3	Galway	1-12 - 1-15	Clare	Pearse Stadium, Salthill
	E Cloonan 1-6, D Tierney 0-3, D Forde 0-1, A Kerins 0-1, D Hayes 0-1.		N Gilligan 0-6, F Lohan 1-0, C Lynch 0-3, A Markham 0-2, T Griffin 0-2, D McMahon 0-1, S McMahon 0-1.	Referee: P Horan (Offaly)

14 March 2004 Round 3	Kilkenny	2-14 - 2-10	Laois	Nowlan Park, Kilkenny
	H Shefflin 1-6, E Brennan 1-0, C Phelan 0-4, M Comerford 0-2, T Walsh 0-1, A Fogarty 0-1.		J Young 1-5, D Culleton 1-0, L Tynan 0-2, D Cuddy 0-2, P Mahon 0-1.	Referee: D Kirwan (Cork)

21 March 2004 Round 4	Waterford	1-14 - 5-13	Galway	Walsh Park, Waterford
	P Flynn 1-7, J Mullane 0-3, D Shanahan 0-2, D Bennett 0-2.		E Cloonan 3-7, Damien Hayes 2-1, D Forde 0-3, A Kerins 0-1, R Gantley 0-1.	Referee: W Barrett (Tipperary)

21 March 2004 Round 4	Clare	1-12 - 2-10	Kilkenny	Cusack Park, Ennis
	N Gilligan 1-2, S McMahon 0-4, A Markham 0-3, T Griffin 0-1, C Lynch 0-1, D Forde 0-1.		H Shefflin 1-8, DJ Carey 1-1, E Brennan 0-1.	Referee: S Roche (Tipperary)

21 March 2004 Round 4	Laois	3-14 - 1-6	Dublin	O'Moore Park, Portlaoise
	J Young 1-7, D Cuddy 1-2, E Jackman 1-0, J Walsh 0-1, C Coonan 0-1, T Fitzgerald 0-1, L Tynan 0-1, R Jones 0-1.		L Ryan 1-2, C Keaney 0-2, D Sweeney 0-1, K Flynn 0-1.	Referee: J McGrath (Westmeath)

28 March 2004 Round 5	Galway	3-22 - 1-8	Laois	Pearse Stadium, Salthill
	E Cloonan (1-9, four frees one 65), T Og Regan (1-2), A Kerins (1-1), D Hayes (0-4), D Forde (0-3), R Gantley (0-1), F Healy (0-1), A Cullinane (0-1).		J Young 1-7, M McEvoy 0-1.	Referee: P Dunphy (Kilkenny)

28 March 2004 Round 5	Kilkenny	1-15 - 0-9	Dublin	Nowlan Park, Kilkenny
	DJ Carey 1-5, H Shefflin 0-5, T Walsh 0-2, C Phelan 0-1, E Brennan 0-1, S Dowling 0-1.		D Curtin 0-7, A Glennon 0-1, M Carton 0-1.	Referee: S Whelan (Wexford)

28 March 2004 Round 5	Clare	1-16 - 1-14	Waterford	Cusack Park, Ennis
	N Gilligan 1-5, S McMahon 0-2, A Quinn 0-2, D O’Connell 0-2, T Griffin 0-1, A Markham 0-1, D Forde 0-1, O Baker 0-1, S Moloney 0-1.		P Flynn 1-7, J Mullane 0-3, M Walsh 0-1, A Moloney 0-1, D Shanahan 0-1, J Kennedy 0-1.	Referee: D Kirwan (Cork)

=== Division 1B table ===
Pos	Team	Pld	W	D	L	Pts	Notes
1	Cork	5	4	1	0	9	Advanced to Group 1
2	Tipperary	5	3	1	1	8	Advanced to Group 1
3	Limerick	5	3	0	2	6	Advanced to Group 1
4	Offaly	5	3	0	2	6	Advanced to Group 2
5	Wexford	5	1	0	4	2	Advanced to Group 2
6	Antrim	5	0	0	5	0	Advanced to Group 2

=== Group stage results ===
22 February 2004 Round 1	Wexford	2-17 - 1-10	Antrim	Wexford Park, Wexford
	P Codd 0-6, R Codd 1-1, A O’Leary 1-1, R Jacob 0-3, M Jordan 0-2, B Lambert 0-2, T Mahon 0-1, J O’Connor 0-1.		L Watson 1-3, A Delargy 0-2, B McFall 0-2, K McKeegan 0-1, C Herron 0-1, S Kelly 0-1.	Referee: M Wadding (Waterford)

22 February 2004 Round 1	Offaly	1-15 - 0-17	Tipperary	St. Brendan's Park, Birr
	R Hanniffy 0-9, G Hanniffy 1-0, B Murphy 0-2, C Cassidy 0-1, M O’Hara 0-1, N Coughlan 0-1, D Hayden 0-1.		G O’Grady 0-3, E Kelly 0-3, S Maher 0-3, P Kelly 0-2, E Corcoran 0-2, E Enright 0-1, B Dunne 0-1, S Butler 0-1, B O’Meara 0-1.	Referee: P Dunphy (Kilkenny)

22 February 2004 Round 1	Limerick	1-9 - 0-14	Cork	Gaelic Grounds, Limerick
	P Tobin 1-0, A O’Shaughnessy 0-3, J Meskell 0-2, N Moran 0-2, JP Sheehan 0-1, P O’Grady 0-1.		J O’Callaghan 0-6, A Coughlan 0-2, T McCarthy 0-2, S McGrath 0-2, B Lombard 0-1, E Fitzgerald 0-1.	Referee: S McMahon (Clare)

28 February 2004 Round 2	Cork	2-13 - 0-9	Wexford	Páirc Uí Rinn, Cork
	B Lombard 2-1, J O'Callaghan 0-4, T McCarthy 0-2, T Kenny 0-2, A Coughlan 0-1; S McGrath 0-1, M Byrne 0-1, N McCarthy 0-1.		P Codd 0-4; M Jacob 0-4, D Ruth 0-1	Referee: P Aherne (Carlow)

29 February 2004 Round 2	Antrim	2-14 - 2-17	Offaly	Casement Park, Belfast
	A Delargy 1-2, B McFall 1-1, M Herron 0-3, L Watson 0-2, S Kelly 0-2, C Herron 0-2, C Connolly 0-1, N Reynolds 0-1.		D Murray 1-1, R Hanniffy 0-4, N Coughlan 1-0, B Murphy 0-3, B Carroll 0-2, G Hanniffy 0-2, R McRedmond 0-2, M Cordial 0-2, D Hayden 0-1.	Referee: E Morris (Dublin)

29 February 2004 Round 2	Limerick	1-12 - 2-21	Tipperary	Gaelic Grounds, Limerick
	A O’Shaughnessy 0-5, D Ryan 1-0, P Tobin 0-2, N Moran 0-2, J O’Brien 0-1, C Carey 0-1, D Sheehan 0-1.		E Kelly 1-9, B Dunne 0-6, P Kelly 0-6, T Dunne 1-0.	Referee: B Kelly (Westmeath)

14 March 2004 Round 3	Antrim	2-5 - 0-14	Cork	Casement Park, Belfast
	L Watson 1-0, C Connolly 1-0, B McFall 0-3, J Connolly 0-1, M Scullion 0-1.		J O'Callaghan 0-9, P Tierney 0-1, M Byrne 0-1, S McGrath 0-1, K Murphy 0-1, B Lombard 0-1.	Referee: E Morris (Dublin)

14 March 2004 Round 3	Wexford	1-13 - 4-18	Tipperary	Wexford Park, Wexford
	P Codd 0-10, R Codd 1-0, P Carley 0-2, R Jacob 0-1.		J Carroll 2-2, L Corbett 2-1, P O’Brien 0-6, S Butler 0-3, P Kelly 0-2, T Dunne 0-1, G O’Grady 0-1, E Enright 0-1, N Moloney 0-1.	Referee: S McMahon (Clare)

14 March 2004 Round 3	Offaly	1-6 - 1-13	Limerick	St. Brendan's Park, Birr
	R Hanniffy 1-2, B Carroll 0-1, B Murphy 0-1, G Hanniffy 0-1, M O’Hara 0-1.		D Ryan 1-2, A O’Shaughnessy 0-3, P O’Grady 0-3, M McKenna 0-1, S O’Connor 0-1, M Foley 0-1, P Tobin 0-1, J O’Brien 0-1.	Referee: M Wadding (Waterford)

21 March 2004 Round 4	Cork	3-11 - 1-15	Offaly	Páirc Uí Chaoimh, Cork
	J O’Callaghan 0-7, K Murphy 2-0, K Murphy (Sarsfields) 1-0, P Tieney 0-2, J Gardiner 0-1, J Deane 0-1.		J Brady 1-1, R Hanniffy 0-5, C Cassidy 0-2, B Carroll 0-2, G Hanniffy 0-2, B Murphy 0-1, M Cordial 0-1, K Brady 0-1.	Referee: P Aherne (Carlow)

21 March 2004 Round 4	Tipperary	5-23 - 0-13	Antrim	Semple Stadium, Thurles
	E Kelly 2-8, T Dunne 2-2, B Dunne 0-5, B Cummins 1-0, P O’Brien 0-3, S Butler 0-2, P Kelly 0-1, J Carroll 0-1, G O’Grady 0-1.		C Herron 0-3, M Herron 0-3, A Delargy 0-3, S Kelly 0-2, K McKeegan 0-1, L Watson 0-1.	Referee: M Haverty (Galway)

21 March 2004 Round 4	Limerick	1-13 - 1-12	Wexford	Gaelic Grounds, Limerick
	A O’Shaughnessy 1-6, D Sheehan 0-3, D Ryan 0-2, P O’Grady 0-1, M McKenna 0-1.		R Jacob 1-3, P Codd 0-3, R Stafford 0-2, P Carley 0-2, M Jordan 0-1, M Jacob 0-1.	Referee: B Kelly (Westmeath)

28 March 2004 Round 5	Antrim	1-15 - 3-21	Limerick	Casement Park, Belfast
	L Watson 1-6, M Herron 0-2, C McGuckian 0-2, C Herron 0-1, J Connolly 0-1, B McFall 0-1, P Richmond 0-1, A Delargy 0-1.		P O’Grady 0-7, JP Sheehan 1-2, P Tobin 1-2, D Sheehan 1-1, O Moran 0-3, A O’Shaughnessy 0-3, S O’Connor 0-2, D Ryan 0-1.	Referee: F Smith (Meath)

28 March 2004 Round 5	Cork	2-17 - 1-20	Tipperary	Páirc Uí Chaoimh, Cork
	J O’Callaghan 0-9, K Murphy 1-0, E Collins 1-0, P Tierney 0-2, J Deane 0-2, J Gardiner 0-2, M Byrne 0-1, A Coughlan 0-1.		E Kelly 1-4, P Kelly 0-7, B Dunne 0-3, P O’Brien 0-3, N Moloney 0-1, M O’Leary 0-1, J Carroll 0-1.	Referee: S McMahon (Clare)

28 March 2004 Round 5	Offaly	1-18 - 2-11	Wexford	St. Brendan's Park, Birr
	R Hanniffy 0-9, D Murray 1-0, B Carroll 0-3, M Cordial 0-2, B Murphy 0-1, Brian Whelehan 0-1, N Coughlan 0-1, G Hanniffy 0-1.		MJ Furlong 2-0, P Carley 0-6, R Stafford 0-1, R McCarthy 0-1, D Ruth 0-1, M Jacob 0-1, B Lambert 0-1.	Referee: A Mac Suibhne (Dublin)

=== Group 1 table ===
Pos	Team	Pld	W	D	L	Pts	Notes
1	Waterford	3	2	1	0	5	Division 1 runners-up
2	Galway	3	2	0	1	4	Division 1 champions
3	Clare	3	2	0	1	4	
4	Tipperary	3	1	1	1	3	
5	Limerick	3	1	0	2	2	
6	Cork	3	0	0	3	0	

=== Group 1 results ===
11 April 2004 Round 1	Clare	1-20 - 1-15	Tipperary	Cusack Park, Ennis
	N Gilligan 0-9, F Lohan 1-0, C Lynch 0-3, T Griffin 0-2, J O’Connor 0-1, C Plunkett 0-1, G Quinn 0-1, O Baker 0-1, D McMahon 0-1, D Forde 0-1.		J Carroll 1-0, P O’Brien 0-8, S Butler 0-3, E Enright 0-2, P Kelly 0-1, B Dunne 0-1.	Referee: A Mac Suibhne (Dublin)

11 April 2004 Round 1	Waterford	1-20 - 4-7	Limerick	Walsh Park, Waterford
	P Flynn 1-4, E Kelly 0-3, D Bennett 0-3, J Mullane 0-3, S Prendergast 0-2, D Shanahan 0-2, M Walsh 0-1, A Moloney 0-1, K McGrath 0-1.		A O’Shaughnessy 2-3, E O’Neill, 1-2, M McKenna 1-0, JP Sheahan 0-1, P Tobin 0-1.	Referee: P Dunphy (Kilkenny)

11 April 2004 Round 1	Galway	3-13 - 1-15	Cork	Pearse Stadium, Galway
	A Kerins 2-1, E Cloonan 1-4, D Hayes 0-3, F Healy 0-2, T Og Regan 0-1, D Forde 0-1, K Broderick 0-1.		J O’Callaghan 0-5, J Deane 1-0, B Leonard 0-3, J Gardiner 0-3, P Tierney 0-2, N McCarthy 0-2.	Referee: B Kelly (Westmeath)

18 April 2004 Round 2	Limerick	2-11 - 1-12	Clare	Gaelic Grounds, Limerick
	N. Moran 1-3 (1-1 frees; 0-1 65); P Tobin 1-0; E O'Neill 0-3 (0-2 frees); M McKenna, D Ryan, J O'Brien, S O'Connor, J Butler, 0-1 each.	Report	J O'Connor 0-6 (all frees); A Markham 1-1; S McMahon 0-3 (0-2 frees, 0-1 65); B O'Connor, G Quinn, 0-1 each.	Referee: S Hogan (Tipperary)

18 April 2004 Round 2	Tipperary	2-15 - 2-13	Galway	Semple Stadium, Thurles
	E Kelly 0-8 (0-6 frees); P O'Brien, J Butler 1-0 each; J Carroll, E Enright, B Dunne 0-2 each; P Kelly 0-1.	Report	K Broderick 2-1; E Cloonan 0-6 (0-5 frees); A Kerins, D Forde 0-2 each; F Healy, M Kerins 0-1 each.	Referee: D. Kirwan (Cork)

18 April 2004 Round 2	Cork	0-13 - 0-14	Waterford	Páirc Uí Rinn, Cork
	J O'Callaghan 0-5 (0-4 from frees); J Gardiner 0-4 (0-1 from free); T McCarthy, N McCarthy, B Lombard and M O'Connell 0-1 each.	Report	P Flynn 0-5 (0-3 from frees); J Mullane 0-3; D Bennett 0-3 (0-2 from frees); D Shanahan, E Kelly and P O'Brien 0-1 each.	Referee: A Mac Suibhne (Dublin)

24 April 2004 Round 3	Cork	0-18 - 2-20	Clare	Páirc Uí Rinn, Cork
	B O’Connor 0-6 (0-3 frees, 0-2 65s); N McCarthy, P Tierney, J Anderson, J Deane, K Murphy (Sars) 0-2 each; T McCarthy, G Callanan 0-1 each.	Report	N Gilligan 1-8 (0-6 frees); D O’Connell 1-1; S McMahon (0-2 frees, 0-1 65), T Griffin 0-3 each; C Lynch 0-2; J O’Connor, F Lohan, A Markham 0-1 each.	Referee: E Morris (Dublin)

25 April 2004 Round 3	Galway	3-15 - 1-10	Limerick	Pearse Stadium, Galway
	E Cloonan 1-8 (0-6 frees, 0-1 seventy); K Broderick 1-2; D Hayes 1-0; A Kerins and A Cullinane 0-2 each; T Og Regan 0-1.	Report	N Moran 1-2 frees; E O'Neill 0-6 (0-4 frees); D Sheehan 0-2.	Referee: A Mac Suibhne (Dublin)

25 April 2004 Round 3	Tipperary	3-16 - 1-22	Waterford	Semple Stadium, Thurles
	E Kelly (1-7, 0-4 frees); J Carroll (1-2); S Butler (1-0); C Morrissey (0-2); B Dunne (0-2); P Kelly (free), P O’Brien, E Enright (0-1) each.	Report	P Flynn (1-11, frees); E Kelly (0-3); J Mullane (0-3); D Bennett (0-3, 0-2 frees); S Prendergast (0-1); D Shanahan (0-1).	Referee: T McIntyre (Antrim)

=== Group 2 table ===
Pos	Team	Pld	W	D	L	Pts	Notes
1	Kilkenny	3	3	0	0	6	
2	Laois	3	2	1	0	5	
3	Dublin	3	1	1	1	3	
4	Wexford	3	1	1	1	3	
5	Antrim	3	0	1	2	1	
6	Offaly	3	0	0	3	0	Relegated to Division 2

=== Group 2 results ===
11 April 2004 Round 1	Dublin	1-10 - 1-10	Antrim	Parnell Park, Dublin
	D Curtin 0-8, C Keaney 1-0, C Meehan 0-1, S Hiney 0-1.		L Watson 1-7, P Richmond 0-2, B McCall 0-1.	Referee: J McDonnell (Tipperary)

11 April 2004 Round 1	Laois	2-18 - 2-18	Wexford	O'Moore Park, Portlaoise
	J Young 0-8, D Culleton 2-1, R Jones 0-3, C Coonan 0-2, David Cuddy 0-1, J Fitzpatrick 0-1, P Cuddy 0-1, E Jackman 0-1.		B Lambert 1-8, R Jacob 1-1, M Jordan 0-3, A Fenlon 0-2, D O’Connor 0-1, MJ Furlong 0-1, R Stafford 0-1, D Ruth 0-1.	Referee: S Roche (Tipperary)

11 April 2004 Round 1	Kilkenny	2-13 - 0-11	Offaly	Nowlan Park, Kilkenny
	DJ Carey 0-6, A Fogarty 1-2, J Coogan 1-1, B Hogan 0-1, P Tennyson 0-1, J Tyrrell 0-1, E Brennan 0-1.		D Murray 0-6, B Carroll 0-2, D Hayden 0-1, R Hanniffy 0-1, M Cordial 0-1.	Referee: J Sexton (Limerick)

18 April 2004 Round 2	Wexford	1-17 - 3-22	Kilkenny	Wexford Park, Wexford
	B Lambert 0-8, R Jacob 1-2, D Ruth 0-3, M Jacob 0-1, D O’Connor 0-1, P Carley 0-1, J O’Connor 0-1.		J Coogan 0-10, M Comerford 2-2, E Brennan 1-2, A Fogarty 0-2, J Hoyne 0-2, D Lyng 0-1, C Phelan 0-1, E Mackey 0-1, J Ryall 0-1.	Referee: J Sexton (Limerick)

18 April 2004 Round 2	Antrim	2-11 - 1-24	Laois	Casement Park, Belfast
	L Watson 1-3, J Connolly 1-2, B McFall 0-3, K McKeegan 0-1, L Richmond 0-1, P Richmond 0-1.		J Young (0-7), L Tynan (0-5), R Jones (1-1); D Cuddy (0-4), C Brophy (0-3), D Culleton (0-2), J Dunne (0-2).	Referee: O Smith (Meath)

18 April 2004 Round 2	Dublin	4-21 - 2-6	Offaly	O'Moore Park, Portlaoise
	C Keaney 1-6, D Donnelly 2-2, L Ryan 1-2, R Fallon 0-4, D Curtin 0-2, A de Paor 0-1, J McGurk 0-1, C Meehan 0-1, M Carton 0-1, S Mullen 0-1.		D Murray 1-2, C Gath 1-0, M Cordial 0-1, B Carroll 0-1, D Hayden 0-1, S Whelehan 0-1.	Referee: D Richardson (Limerick)

25 April 2004 Round 3	Wexford	2-16 - 1-12	Dublin	Wexford Park, Wexford
	B Lambert 0-5, M Jordan 1-1, L Murphy 1-0, T Mahon 0-3, R Jacob 0-3, M Jacob 0-3, P Carley 0-1.		C Keaney 0-5, P Fleury 1-0, L Ryan 0-3, J McGuirk 0-2, S McCann 0-1, C O’Brien 0-1.	Referee: D O'Driscoll (Limerick)

25 April 2004 Round 3	Kilkenny	3-31 - 3-7	Antrim	Nowlan Park, Kilkenny
	J Coogan 1-9, A Fogarty 0-6, J Maher 0-5, H Shefflin 1-1, J Fitzpatrick 1-1, C Phelan 0-4, P Tennyson 0-3, E Brennan 0-2.		L Watson 3-4, P Richmond 0-2, C McGuckian 0-1.	Referee: J Kelly (Wexford)

25 April 2004 Round 3	Offaly	2-12 - 2-13	Laois	St. Brendan's Park, Birr
	D Murray 2-3, G Hanniffy 0-2, D Hayden 0-2, S Whelehan 0-1, J Brady 0-1, N Coughlan 0-1, B Whelehan 0-1, M Cordial 0-1.		J Young 0-7, D Culleton 2-0, L Tynan 0-2, E Jackman 0-1, E Meagher 0-1, F Kennan 0-1, E Brown 0-1.

=== Knock-out stage ===
Final

9 May 2004 Final	Galway	2-15 - 1-13	Waterford	Gaelic Grounds, Limerick
	E Cloonan 2-4 (1-3 frees); A Cullinane, D Hayes, K Broderick, A Kerins and D Forde 0-2 each; D Hardiman 0-1.	Report	D Shanahan 1-3; P Flynn 0-5 (0-3 frees); E Kelly 0-2; D Bennett, J Mullane and S Prendergast 0-1 each.	Attendance: 16,750; Referee: T McIntyre (Antrim)

=== Scoring statistics ===
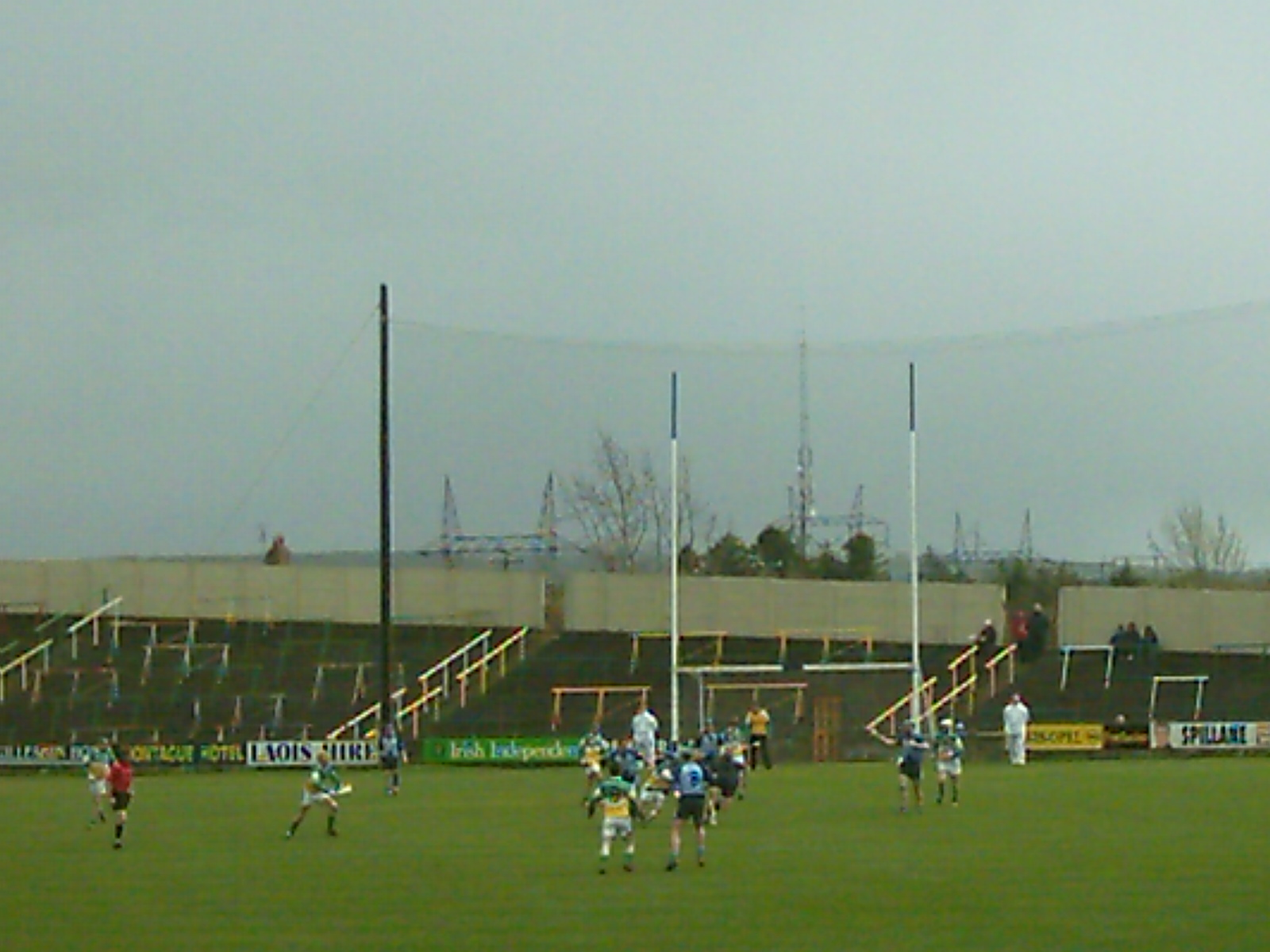
Dublin v. Offaly, 18 April 2004

Top scorers overall

Rank	Player	Team	Tally	Total	Matches	Average
1	Eugene Cloonan	Galway	10-62	92	9	10.22
2	Paul Flynn	Waterford	5-58	73	9	8.11
3	James Young	Laois	3-48	57	8	7.12
4	Eoin Kelly	Tipperary	5-39	54		
5	Liam Watson	Antrim	8-26	50	8	6.25
6	Niall Gilligan	Clare	5-33	48		
7	Jonathan O'Callaghan	Cork	0-45	45		
8	Henry Shefflin	Kilkenny	3-32	41	6	6.83
9	Rory Hanniffy	Offaly	1-30	33		
10	Conal Keaney	Dublin	5-17	32		
10	Andrew O'Shaughnessy	Limerick	3-23	32		
10	David Curtin	Dublin	0-32	32		

Top scorers in a single game

Rank	Player	Team	Tally	Total	Opposition
1	Eugene Cloonan	Galway	3-07	16	Waterford
2	Eoin Kelly	Tipperary	2-08	14	Antrim
2	Paul Flynn	Waterford	1-11	14	Tipperary
4	Liam Watson	Antrim	3-04	13	Kilkenny
5	Eugene Cloonan	Galway	1-09	12	Laois
5	Eoin Kelly	Tipperary	1-09	12	Limerick
5	Jimmy Coogan	Kilkenny	1-09	12	Antrim
5	Eugene Cloonan	Galway	0-12	12	Kilkenny
9	Paul O'Brien	Waterford	3-02	11	Dublin
9	Henry Shefflin	Kilkenny	1-08	11	Clare
9	Niall Gilligan	Clare	1-08	11	Cork
9	Eugene Cloonan	Galway	1-08	11	Limerick
9	Barry Lambert	Wexford	1-08	11	Laois

== Division 2 ==
National Hurling League Division 2
- Season: 2004
- Champions: Down; Captain: Simon Wilson; Manager: John Crossey
- Relegated: Mayo
- Matches: 32
- Top goalscorer: Andrew Mitchell (1-56)
- Biggest home win: Westmeath 1-25 - 0-10 Wicklow (11 April 2004)
- Biggest away win: Kerry 9-13 - 0-15 Carlow (29 February 2004)
- Highest scoring: Down 2-28 - 4-11 Kerry (11 April 2004)
- All statistics correct as of 12 April 2017.

Derry and Mayo entered Division 2 as the respective relegated and promoted teams from the 2003 season.

On 9 May 2004, Down won the title following a 5-15 to 3-7 win over Westmeath in the final.

Mayo were relegated from Division 2 after losing all of their group stage matches in the relegation group.

Westmeath's Andrew Mitchell was the Division 2 top scorer with 1-56.

=== Division 2A table ===
Pos	Team	Pld	W	D	L	Pts	Notes
1	Down	4	3	1	0	7	Advanced to Group 1
2	Westmeath	4	3	1	0	7	Advanced to Group 1
3	Roscommon	4	2	0	2	4	Advanced to Group 1
4	Kildare	4	1	0	3	2	Advanced to Group 2
5	Derry	4	0	0	4	0	Advanced to Group 2

=== Group stage results ===
22 February 2004 Round 1	Derry	1-10 - 0-15	Down	Fr. McNally Park, Feeny
	Gregory Biggs 1-4, D Magill 0-3, Gary Biggs 0-2, B McGoldrick 0-1.		J McGrattan (0-5, four frees); G Johnson (0-4); S Wilson (0-3, one 65, two frees); P Braniff, B McGourty, M Coulter (0-1 each).	Referee: G Devlin (Armagh)

22 February 2004 Round 1	Westmeath	2-11 - 0-16	Kildare	Cusack Park, Mullingar
	A Mitchell 0-9, D Carthy 1-0, D Conway 1-0, D McCormack 0-1, D Gallagher 0-1.		T Carew 0-13, C Divilly 0-2, A McAndrew 0-1.	Referee: M Haverty (Galway)

29 February 2004 Round 2	Roscommon	1-13 - 2-5	Derry	Athleague Sportsfield, Athleague
	S Sweeney 1-2, S Curley 0-5, F Quine 0-3, T Lennon 0-2, D Mulvey 0-1.		R Convery 1-2, P Carton 1-1, Gregory Biggs 0-2.	Referee: D Richardson (Limerick)

29 February 2004 Round 2	Down	1-15 - 2-12	Westmeath	Mitchell Park, Ballygalget
	J McGrattan 0-6, B McGourty 1-2, M Coulter 0-2, G McGrattan 0-2, S Wilson 0-2.		B Kennedy 1-4, J Shaw, A Mitchell 0-6, D Carty 1-0, D McNicholas 0-2.	Referee: F Smith (Meath)

14 March 2004 Round 3	Kildare	0-19 - 2-16	Down	St. Conleth's Park, Newbridge
	T Carew 0-8 (6f), C Divilly 0-4, J Dempsey and A McAndrew 0-3 each, S Gleeson 0-1.		Down: J McGrattan 1-4 (0-2f), G McGrattan 1-1, S Wilson 0-4, M Braniff and E Clarke 0-2 each, B McGourty, M Coulter, P Braniff 0-1 each.	Referee: F Smith (Meath)

13 March 2004 Round 3	Westmeath	3-14 - 0-9	Roscommon	Cusack Park, Mullingar
	A Mitchell 1-5, J Shaw 1-2, B Kennedy 1-1, V Bateman 0-4, O Devine 0-1; D McNicholas 0-1.		T Lennon 0-3, S Curley 0-2; C Kelly 0-2, F Quinn 0-1, M Connaughton 0-1.	Referee: D O'Donovan (Dublin)

21 March 2004 Round 4	Derry	2-10 - 2-13	Westmeath	Lavey
	Gregory Biggs 2-7, C Quinn 0-1, P Hearty 0-1, P Carton 0-1		B Kennedy 2-0, A Mitchell 0-6, P Donnellan 0-2, E Loughlin 0-1, J Slevin 0-1, F Slevin 0-1, J Forbes 0-1, P Williams 0-1.	Referee: G Robinson (Antrim)

21 March 2004 Round 4	Roscommon	2-9 - 0-9	Kildare	Athleague Sportsfield, Athleague
	C Kelly 0-6, B Hanley 1-1, S Sweeney 1-1, M Connaughton 0-1.		T Carew 0-3, A McAndrew 0-2, C Divilly 0-1, T Spain 0-1, S O’Carroll 0-1, C Boran 0-1.	Referee: J McDonnell (Tipperary)

28 March 2004 Round 5	Kildare	1-14 - 1-7	Derry	St. Conleth's Park, Newbridge
	T Carew 1-8, C Buggy 0-1, S O’Carroll 0-1, C Divilly 0-1, A McAndrew 0-1, T Spain 0-1, C Boran 0-1.		P Hearty 1-1, G Biggs 0-4, E McGuigan 0-1, P Cartin 0-1.	Referee: D O'Driscoll (Limerick)

28 March 2004 Round 5	Down	2-23 - 1-9	Roscommon	St. Patrick's Park, Portaferry
	P Braniff 1-6, S Wilson 0-5, G Johnson 1-1, J McGrattan 0-3, B McGourty 0-3, A Savage 0-1, G Adair 0-1, G McGrattan 0-1, M Coulter 0-1, M Braniff 0-1.		A Coyne 1-2, C Kelly 0-4, B Hanley 0-1, M Connaughton 0-1, T Lennon 0-1.	Referee: G Devlin (Armagh)

=== Division 2B table ===
Pos	Team	Pld	W	D	L	Pts	Notes
1	Kerry	4	4	0	0	8	Advanced to Group 1
2	Wicklow	4	2	0	2	4	Advanced to Group 1
3	Meath	4	2	0	2	4	Advanced to Group 1
4	Mayo	4	1	0	3	2	Advanced to Group 2
5	Carlow	4	0	0	4	0	Advanced to Group 2

=== Group stage results ===
22 February 2004 Round 1	Wicklow	0-9 - 2-11	Carlow	Aughrim County Ground, Aughrim
	J Keogh 0-5, J Bermingham 0-1, T McGrath 0-1, W O’Gorman 0-1, C Kavanagh 0-1.		D Murphy 2-1, P Coady 0-6, E Coady 0-1, J Hickey 0-1, SM Murphy 0-1, K English 0-1.	Referee: S Whelan (Wexford)

22 February 2004 Round 1	Kerry	5-15 - 1-12	Mayo	Austin Stack Park, Tralee
	JM Dooley 3-1, M Conway 1-1, E Tuohy 1-0, S Brick 0-3, A Cronin 0-3, J Bunyan 0-2, M Slattery 0-2, C Harris 0-1, P O’Connell 0-1, I McCarthy 0-1.		A Healy 1-0, D McConn 0-3, K Higgins 0-3, A Hession 0-3, D McDonnell 0-2, P Higgins 0-1.	Referee: K Healy (Cork)

29 February 2004 Round 2	Meath	2-9 - 2-14	Wicklow	Páirc Tailteann, Navan
	N Horan 2-1, S Reilly 0-6, C Ryan 0-1, J Canty 0-1.		J Keogh 0-9, D Hyland 1-2, D Moran 1-0, J Murphy 0-1, T McGrath 0-1, J Birmingham 0-1.	Referee: J Guinan (Kilkenny)

29 February 2004 Round 2	Carlow	0-15 - 9-13	Kerry	Dr. Cullen Park, Carlow
	P Coady 0-9, D Roberts 0-2, P Kehoe 0-2, SM Murphy 0-1, T Shiel 0-1		S Brick 3-9, JM Dooley 4-2, E Tuohy 1-0, J Bunyan 1-0, M Conway 0-1, P Cronin 0-1.	Referee: J Sexton (Limerick)

13 March 2004 Round 3	Mayo	3-13 - 0-7	Carlow	James Stephens Park, Ballina
	K Higgins 1-8, A Healy 1-2, S Broderick 1-0, P Higgins 0-2, A Hession 0-1.		Pat Coady 0-4, S Hickey 0-1, Paddy Coady 0-1, D Murphy 0-1.	Referee: T Holinan (Galway)

14 March 2004 Round 3	Kerry	2-15 - 0-12	Meath	Fitzgerald Stadium, Killarney
	JM Dooley 2-1, S Brick 0-6 (6f), M Slattery, A Cronin 0-2 each, P O'Connell, C Harris, J Bunyan, J Egan 0-1 each.		M Cole 0-5 (3f), G O'Neill, J Keena, P Coone 0-2, N Horan 0-1 each.	Referee: D Richardson (Limerick)

20 March 2004 Round 4	Meath	1-13 - 1-10	Mayo	Páirc Tailteann, Navan
	N Horan 1-3, P Coone 0-2; S Reilly 0-2, M Cole 0-1, G O’Neill 0-1; E Lynam 0-1, S Corrigan 0-1, J Keena 0-1, C Sheridan 0-1.		K Higgins 1-3, P Higgins 0-4, D McDonnell 0-1, D McConn 0-1, J Hogan 0-1.	Referee: G Devlin (Armagh)

20 March 2004 Round 4	Wicklow	1-7 - 1-13	Kerry	Aughrim County Ground, Aughrim
			S Brick 0-6; J Egan 1-0, A Cronin 0-2, J Bunyan 0-1, I McCarthy 0-1; E Touhy 0-1, J McCarthy 0-1, L Boyle 0-1.

28 March 2004 Round 5	Carlow	0-12 - 1-13	Meath	Dr. Cullen Park, Carlow
	K English 0-4, Pat Coady 0-4, SM Murphy 0-2, D Murphy 0-1, E Coady 0-1.		M Cole 0-5, S Clynch 1-1, S Reilly 0-2, N Reilly 0-2, G O’Neill 0-1, J Canty 0-1, J Kenna 0-1.	Referee: B Gavin (Offaly)

28 March 2004 Round 5	Mayo	0-16 - 0-22	Wicklow	James Stephens Park, Ballina
	K Higgins 0-9, P Higgins 0-2, D Walsh 0-2, J Hogan 0-1, D McDonnell 0-1, D McConn 0-1.		S O’Neill 0-9, D Hyland 0-3, J Murphy 0-3, G Doran 0-2, A Tiernan 0-2, C O’Toole 0-1, M O’Neill 0-1, D Moran 0-1.	Referee: J O'Mahony (Limerick)

=== Group 1 table ===
Pos	Team	Pld	W	D	L	Pts	Notes
1	Westmeath	3	3	0	0	6	Division 2 runners-up
2	Down	2	2	0	0	4	Division 2 champions
3	Roscommon	3	2	0	1	4	
4	Kerry	3	1	0	2	2	
5	Meath	2	0	0	2	0	
6	Wicklow	3	0	0	3	0	

=== Group 1 results ===
11 April 2004 Round 1	Down	2-28 - 4-11	Kerry	St. Patrick's Park, Portaferry
	G Johnson 1-5, P Braniff 1-5, J McGrattan 0-8, G McGrattan 0-5, A Savage 0-2, G Adair 0-1, B McGourty 0-1, M Coulter 0-1.		S Brick 0-6, JM Dooley 1-2, J Egan 1-1, M Lucid 1-0, L Boyle 1-0, M Conway 0-1, C Harris 0-1.	Referee: E Morris (Dublin)

11 April 2004 Round 1	Roscommon	3-13 - 0-15	Meath	Athleague Sportsfield, Athleague
	C Kelly 0-6, T Reddington 1-1, F Quine 1-1, R Kennedy 1-0, A Coyne 0-2, L Connaughton, B Hanley, D Connell 0-1 each.		T Reilly 0-7, G O Neill, E Lynam, S Clynch 0-2 each, C Sheridan, D Donnelly 0-1 each.	Referee: M Haverty (Galway)

11 April 2004 Round 1	Westmeath	1-25 - 0-10	Wicklow	Castletown Geoghegan
	A Mitchell 0-11, D McCormack 0-4, R Whelan 1-0, B Kennedy 0-3, P Dowdall 0-2, J Shaw 0-2, B Murtagh 0-1, V Bateman 0-1, D Gallagher 0-1.		J O’Neill 0-7, J Murphy 0-1, T McGrath 0-1, T Finn 0-1.	Referee: B Gavin (Offaly)

17 April 2004 Round 2	Kerry	3-17 - 1-11	Roscommon	Austin Stack Park, Tralee
	JM Dooley 2-2, P O’Connell 0-5, M Slattery 1-1, C Harris 0-2, J Egan 0-2, S Brick 0-2, A Cronin 0-1, I McCarthy 0-1, J Bunyan 0-1,		C Kelly 0-6, T Reddington 1-0, M Connaghton 0-2, A Coyne 0-1, R Kennedy 0-1, S McSweeney 0-1.

18 April 2004 Round 2	Wicklow	2-13 - 1-19	Down	Pearse Park, Arklow
	J O’Neill 2-8, C Kavanagh 0-2, J Murphy 0-2, A Tiernan 0-1.		P Braniff 1-4, G Johnston 0-5, A Savage 0-3, M Coulter 0-2, J McGrattan 0-2, B McGourty 0-1, E Dorrian 0-1, M Pucci 0-1.

18 April 2004 Round 2	Meath	0-10 - 2-9	Westmeath	St. Loman's Park, Trim
	M Cole 0-4, S Reilly 0-2, E Lynam 0-1, C Sheridan 0-1, N Reilly 0-1, M Horan 0-1.		R Whelan 1-2, A Mitchell 0-4, D McCormack 1-0, J Shaw 0-1, P Williams 0-1, J Forbes 0-1.	Referee: S Whelan (Wicklow)

25 April 2004 Round 3	Kerry	0-9 - 4-21	Westmeath	Austin Stack Park, Tralee
	S Brick 0-6, P O’Connell 0-2, E Tuohy 0-1.		A Mitchell 0-11, B Kennedy 1-5, D Curley 2-1, K Cosgrove 1-1, J Shaw 0-2, B Connaughton 0-1.	Referee: J O'Mahony (Limerick)

25 April 2004 Round 3	Wicklow	2-12 - 3-12	Roscommon	Pearse Park, Arklow
	J O’Neill 1-7, A Tiernan 1-0, D Moran 0-2, E O’Sullivan 0-1, C Kavanagh 0-1, J Murphy 0-1		F Quine 2-1, M Connaughton 0-5, B Mannion 1-0, B Hanley 0-3, L Murray 0-1, C O’Brien 0-1, D Mulvey 0-1.	Referee: J Guinan (Kilkenny)

=== Group 2 table ===
Pos	Team	Pld	W	D	L	Pts	Notes
1	Kildare	1	1	0	0	2	
2	Derry	1	1	0	0	2	
3	Carlow	2	1	0	1	2	
4	Mayo	2	0	0	2	0	Relegated to Division 3

=== Group 2 results ===
10 April 2004 Round 1	Kildare	3-17 - 1-11	Carlow	St. Conleth's Park, Newbridge

11 April 2004 Round 1	Derry	0-12 - 1-8	Mayo	Lavey
	Gregory Biggs 0-8, P Hearty 0-2, P Doherty 0-1, R Convery 0-1.		D Walsh 1-0, D McDonnell 0-3, K Higgins 0-3, S Broderick 0-1.	Referee: G Robinson (Antrim)

18 April 2004 Round 2	Carlow	2-14 - 0-12	Mayo	St. Brendan's Park, Birr
	K English 0-8, S Smithers 2-0, P Kehoe 0-2, D Murphy 0-2, S Kavanagh 0-1, R Minchin 0-1.		K Higgins 0-7, D McConn 0-2, D Walsh 0-2, S Brodrick 0-1.	Referee: J Breen (Galway)

=== Knock-out stage ===
Final

9 May 2004 Final	Down	5-15 – 3-7	Westmeath	Gaelic Grounds, Limerick
	P Braniff 3-9, G Johnson 1-1, M Braniff 1-0, B McGroarty 0-3, A Savage 0-1, D McCusker 0-1.		B Kennedy 2-1, A Mitchell 0-4, J Shaw 1-0, V Bateman 0-1, K Cosgrave 0-1.	Referee: M Haverty (Galway)

=== Scoring statistics ===
Top scorers overall

Rank	Player	Team	Tally	Total	Matches	Average
1	Andrew Mitchell	Westmeath	1-56	59	8	7.37
2	Shane Brick	Kerry	3-38	47	7	6.71

Top scorers in a single game

Rank	Player	Team	Tally	Total	Opposition
1	Shane Brick	Kerry	3-09	18	Carlow
1	Paul Barniff	Down	3-09	18	Westmeath
3	John Mike Dooley	Kerry	4-02	14	Carlow
3	Jonathan O'Neill	Wicklow	2-08	14	Down
5	Gregory Biggs	Derry	2-07	13	Westmeath
5	Tom Carew	Kildare	0-13	13	Westmeath
7	Keith Higgins	Mayo	1-08	11	Carlow
7	Tom Carew	Kildare	1-08	11	Derry
7	Andrew Mitchell	Westmeath	0-11	11	Wicklow
7	Andrew Mitchell	Westmeath	0-11	11	Kerry

== Division 3 ==
=== Division 3A table ===
Pos	Team	Pld	W	D	L	Pts	Notes
1	Sligo	4	3	1	0	7	Advanced to Group 1
2	Armagh	4	3	0	1	6	Advanced to Group 1
3	Leitrim	4	1	2	1	4	Advanced to Group 1
4	Longford	4	0	2	2	2	Advanced to Group 2
5	Donegal	4	0	1	3	1	Advanced to Group 2

=== Group stage results ===
22 February 2004 Round 1	Sligo	2-8 - 1-11	Leitrim	Kilcoyne Park, Tubbercurry

22 February 2004 Round 1	Donegal	1-8 - 2-16	Armagh	O'Donnell Park, Letterkenny

29 February 2004 Round 2	Leitrim	2-10 - 1-13	Longford	Páirc Seán Mac Diarmada, Carrick

29 February 2004 Round 2	Armagh	1-13 - 3-12	Sligo	Derrynoose

14 March 2004 Round 3	Leitrim	0-6 - 0-5	Donegal

14 March 2004 Round 3	Longford	0-5 - 1-10	Sligo	Pearse Park, Longford

20 March 2004 Round 4	Longford	0-9 - 1-6	Donegal	Shroid

21 March 2004 Round 4	Leitrim	1-8 - 2-12	Armagh	Páirc Seán Mac Diarmada, Carrick

28 March 2004 Round 5	Armagh	3-16 - 1-4	Longford	Derrynoose

=== Division 3B table ===
Pos	Team	Pld	W	D	L	Pts	Notes
1	Tyrone	4	3	1	0	7	Advanced to Group 1
2	Fermanagh	4	3	1	0	7	Advanced to Group 1
3	Louth	4	1	1	2	3	Advanced to Group 1
4	Monaghan	4	1	0	3	2	Advanced to Group 2
5	Cavan	4	0	1	3	1	Advanced to Group 2

=== Group 1 table ===
Pos	Team	Pld	W	D	L	Pts	Notes
1	Sligo	3	3	0	0	6	Division 3 champions
2	Tyrone	3	2	0	1	4	Division 3 runners-up
3	Fermanagh	3	2	0	1	4	
4	Armagh	3	1	0	2	2	
5	Leitrim	3	1	0	2	2	
6	Louth	3	0	0	3	0	

=== Group 2 table ===
Pos	Team	Pld	W	D	L	Pts	Notes
1	Donegal	2	2	0	0	4	Division 3 Shield champion
2	Cavan	2	1	0	1	2	Division 3 Shield runner-up
3	Longford	2	0	1	1	1	
4	Monaghan	2	0	1	1	1	

=== Knock-out stage ===
Shield final

9 May 2004 Shield Final	Donegal	4-14 – 2-6	Cavan	Brewster Park, Enniskillen
		Report

Final

9 May 2004 Final	Sligo	3-12 – 1-8	Tyrone	Fr. Tierney Park, Ballyshannon
	P Seevers 2-7, M Gilmartin 1-0, M Burke 0-2, J Carroll 0-1, F Cretaro 0-1, K Raymond 0-1.		P Lavery 0-6, P O’Connor 1-1, T McIntosh 0-1.	Referee: JA Gribben (Down)
