= 2006 Kerry Senior Hurling Championship =

Annual hurling competition season

- Dates: 11 August – 10 September 2006
- Teams: 8
- Sponsor: AIB
- Champions: Ballyduff (21st title); David Slattery (captain); Mike Hennessy (manager)
- Runners-up: Causeway; John Mike Dooley (captain); Richard Keane (manager)

Tournament statistics
- Matches played: 8
- Goals scored: 15 (1.88 per match)
- Points scored: 183 (22.88 per match)
- Top scorer(s): Brian O'Donovan (2-21)

The 2006 Kerry Senior Hurling Championship was the 105th staging of the Kerry Senior Hurling Championship since its establishment by the Kerry County Board in 1889. The championship ran from 11 August to 10 September 2006.

Lixnaw entered the championship as the defending champions, however, they were beaten by Ballyduff in the quarter-finals.

The final was played on 10 September 2006 at Austin Stack Park in Tralee, between Ballyduff and Causeway, in what was their fifth meeting in the final overall and a first final meeting in 22 years. Ballyduff won the match by 1–17 to 1–11 to claim their 21st championship title overall and a first title in 11 years.

Abbeydorney's Brian O'Donovan was the championship's top scorer with 2-21.

== Team changes ==
=== From championship ===
- Decided not to field a team
  - Kenmare

== Results ==
=== Quarter-finals ===
11 August 2006 Quarter-final	Ballyheigue	0-09 - 1-07	Causeway	Austin Stack Park
	M Slattery 0-3, B O'Sullivan 0-3, N Flahive 0-2, WJ Leen 0-1.		T Flynn 0-4, JM Dooley 1-0, S Harty 0-1, C Dineen 0-1, C Flynn 0-1.

12 August 2006 Quarter-final	Crotta O'Neill's	1-09 - 2-11	Kilmoyley	Austin Stack Park
	A Keane 0-6, C McElligott 1-0, S Twomey 0-1, T Cronin 0-1, M Lynch 0-1.		J Murnane 2-1, S Brick 0-5, M Murnane 0-3, T Murnane 0-1, B Harris 0-1.

12 August 2006 Quarter-final	St Brendan's	1-13 - 1-13	Abbeydorney	Austin Stack Park
	C Flaherty 1-1, J Egan 0-4, S Flaherty 0-3, D Dineen 0-2, P Donegan 0-1, F Wallace 0-1, E Corridan 0-1.		B O'Donovan 1-8, I McCarthy 0-1, J McCarthy 0-1, I Maunsell 0-1, A Healy 0-1, B Sheehan 0-1.

13 August 2006 Quarter-final	Lixnaw	1-05 - 0-12	Ballyduff	Austin Stack Park
	M Conway 1-3, M Quilter 0-1, C Fitzmaurice 0-1.		B O'Sullivan 0-8, M Boyle 0-2, D Bowler 0-1, JP Leahy 0-1.

18 August 2006 Quarter-final replay	St Brendan's	1-14 - 1-15	Abbeydorney	Austin Stack Park
			B O'Donovan 1-9, I McCarthy 0-3, N Roche 0-1, A Healy 0-1,

=== Semi-finals ===
27 August 2006 Semi-final	Ballyduff	1-11 - 0-11	Kilmoyley	Austin Stack Park
	B O'Sullivan 0-7, G O'Brien 1-1, T O'Rourke 0-2, A Boyle 0-1.		S Brick 0-8, M Murnane 0-1, D Young 0-1, T Murnane 0-1.

27 August 2006 Semi-final	Causeway	2-14 - 1-11	Abbeydorney	Austin Stack Park
	JM Dooley 1-6, JJ Canty 1-1, C Dineen 0-2, J Dillane 0-2, C Harty 0-1, C Flynn 0-1, T Flynn 0-1.		B O'Donovan 0-4, K Hannafin 1-0, M Hannafin 0-2, B Sheehan 0-2, R Murphy 0-1, B O'Leary 0-1, G Brassil 0-1.

=== Final ===
10 September 2006 Final	Ballyduff	1-17 - 1-11	Causeway	Austin Stack Park
	B O'Sullivan 0-9, T O'Rourke 1-0, B O'Grady 0-3, M Boyle 0-2, JP Leahy 0-1, A Boyle 0-1, M Hennessy 0-1.		JM Dooley 0-6, JJ Canty 1-1, S Goggin 0-3, S Harty 0-1.

== Championship statistics ==
=== Top scorers ===
Overall

Rank	Player	County	Tally	Total	Matches	Average
1	Brian O'Donovan	Abbeydorney	2-21	27	3	9.00
2	Bobby O'Sullivan	Ballyduff	0-24	24	3	8.00
3	John Mike Dooley	Causeway	2-12	18	3	6.00
