= Tadhg Flynn =

Irish sportsperson

Personal information
- Native name: Tadhg Ó Floinn (Irish)
- Born: 1983 (age 42–43) Causeway, County Kerry
- Occupation: Teacher

Sport
- Sport: Hurling
- Position: Goalkeeper
Clubs
- Years: Club
- 2001-2007 2008-2011 2012-: Causeway; Ahane; Causeway
Club titles
- Kerry titles: 1
Inter-county
Years	County	Apps (scores)
2003-2006 2010-2011 2012-2014	Kerry; Limerick; Kerry	6 (0-00); 2 (0-00)
Inter-county titles
- Munster titles: 0
- All-Irelands: 0
- NHL: 1 (Div 2)
- All Stars: 0

Tadhg Flynn (born November 1983 in Causeway, County Kerry) is an Irish sportsperson. He played hurling with Causeway, having previously played with Ahane from 2008 to 2011 and had been a member of the Limerick senior inter-county team from 2010 to 2011. He had previously played with local club Causeway and the Kerry senior inter-county team. As of the 2019–2020 season, the IT Tralee hurling team were being managed by Flynn.

== Championships won ==
=== Club ===
- Kerry Senior Hurling Championship (1): 2019

=== Intercounty ===
Kerry

- National Hurling League Div 2A (1): 2014
- All Ireland Minor B Hurling Championship (1): 2001
- All Ireland U21 B Championship (1): 2002

Limerick

- National Hurling League Div 2 (1): 2011

=== College ===
- Fitzgibbon Cup Runner Up: 2002 (Runner Up) 2005
- Higher Education All Star: 2005
