= 2004–05 All-Ireland Junior Club Football Championship =

- Sponsor: Allied Irish Bank
- Champions: Finuge (1st title)
- Runners-up: Stewartstown Harps

The 2004–05 All-Ireland Junior Club Football Championship was the fourth staging of the All-Ireland Junior Club Football Championship since its establishment by the Gaelic Athletic Association.

The All-Ireland final was played on 28 March 2005 at O'Moore Park in Portlaoise, between Finuge and Stewartstown Harps. Finuge won the match by 1-14 to 0-06 to claim their first ever championship title.

== All-Ireland Junior Club Football Championship ==
=== All-Ireland final ===
| 28 March 2005 Final | Finuge | 1-14 - 0-06 | Stewartstown Harps | O'Moore Park |
| | P Galvin 1-7 (0-4 frees); E Galvin and M Corridan 0-2 each; P Lyons, C Galvin (free) and E Fitzmaurice 0-1 each. | | P Armour 0-3 (0-1 free); O Coyle, A Coyle and J Devlin 0-1 each. | Referee: M Duffy (Sligo) |
