= Paud Costelloe =

Irish hurler

Personal information
- Native name: Padraig Ó Coisdealbha (Irish)
- Born: 1989 (age 36–37) Ballyduff, County Kerry, Ireland

Sport
- Sport: Hurling
- Position: Full-back
Club
- Years: Club
- Ballyduff
Club titles
- Kerry titles: 3
Inter-county
- Years: County
- 2011-present: Kerry

Padraig "Paud" Costelloe (born 1989) is an Irish hurler who plays as a full-back for the Kerry senior team.

Born in Ballyduff, County Kerry, Costelloe first arrived on the inter-county scene when he first linked up with the Kerry minor team in both football and hurling before later joining the under-21 hurling side. He made his senior debut during the 2011 league. Costelloe quickly became a regular member of the starting fifteen and has won one Christy Ring Cup medal.

At club level Costelloe is a three-time championship medalist with Ballyduff.

== Honours ==
=== Team ===
Ballyduff

- Kerry Senior Hurling Championship (3): 2010, 2011, 2012
- Kerry Under-21 Hurling Championship (1): 2010

Kerry

- Christy Ring Cup (2): 2011 (sub), 2015
- National League (Division 2A) (1): 2015

Sporting positions
Preceded by Liam Boyle	Kerry Senior Hurling Captain; 2013	Succeeded by John Egan
