= Ian Brick =

Irish hurler and cricketer

Personal information
- Born: Kilmoyley, County Kerry
- Height: 5 ft 10 in (178 cm)

Sport
- Sport: Hurling and cricket
- Position: Back
Club
- Years: Club
- Kilmoyley
Club titles
- Kerry titles: 8
Inter-county
- Years: County
- 1996-2003 2006: Kerry
Inter-county titles
- All-Irelands: 0

Ian Brick is a former Kerry hurler and cricketer from Kilmoyley County Kerry.
