= John Meyler =

Irish hurler and Gaelic footballer

Personal information
- Native name: Seán Mac Maoilir (Irish)
- Born: 6/7/1967 Tacumshane, County Wexford, Ireland
- Occupation: Lecturer

Sport
- Sport: Hurling
- Position: Midfield
Clubs
- Years: Club
- Our Lady's Island; St Finbarr's
Club titles
| | Football | Hurling |
| Cork titles | 2 | 5 |
| Munster titles | 2 | 1 |
| All-Ireland titles | 1 | 0 |
Inter-county*
| Years | County | Apps (scores) |
| 1978–1982 1983–1987 | Wexford; Cork | 1 (0–00); 2 (0–02) |
Inter-county titles
- Munster titles: 1
- All-Irelands: 1
- NHL: 0
- All Stars: 0
- *Inter County team apps and scores correct as of 12:53, 19 July 2018.

John Meyler (born 1956) is an Irish hurling manager and former selector, association footballer, Gaelic footballer and hurler who is currently the manager of Kilmoyley. He has formerly managed the Kerry, Wexford, Carlow and Cork senior hurling teams.

Meyler's inter-county career spanned fifteen years. Beginning as a dual minor with Wexford, he later played with the county's under-21 and senior sides. After joining the Cork senior team in 1982, Meyler won an All-Ireland medal in 1986. As a dual player with the St Finbarr's club, Meyler won seven county championship medals across both codes, dual Munster medals and an All-Ireland medal as captain of the club's football team in 1987.

As a manager, selector, coach and trainer, Meyler has previously worked with club sides Kilmoyley, Ballinhassig, Courcey Rovers and Inniscarra, and inter-county teams Kerry, Wexford and Carlow. In his second spell with Kerry, he managed the side that won the 2012 Christy Ring Cup.

== Early life ==
Meyler was born in Tacumshane (15 kilometres (9.3 mi) south of Wexford), County Wexford. After being educated locally, he boarded at Gormanston College in East Meath between 1969 and 1974 where he played a wide variety of sports. Meyler graduated from University College Cork with a degree in Chemistry in 1978. He completed an MBA from the Open University in 1997.

== Playing career ==
=== University ===
During his studies at University College Cork, Meyler played a range of sports for various university teams. As a dual player of both hurling and Gaelic football, he was a regular on the university's Fitzgibbon Cup and Sigerson Cup panels, while he also played soccer. On 17 December 1977, Meyler scored a hat trick in UCC's 6-1 defeat of Trinity College Dublin in the Collingwood Cup final.

=== Club ===
Meyler joined the Our Lady's Island club at a young age and played in all grades at juvenile and underage levels, before becoming a dual player with the club's adult team. He won several league titles in both codes with the Our Lady's Island team. He won a Wexford Senior Football Championship with Wexford District in 1977.

Meyler joined the St Finbarr's club in Cork and immediately established himself as a dual player on the club's senior teams. He won his first championship medal with the senior hurling team as a non-playing substitute later that year, before later winning a Munster medal after a 2-12 to 1-14 defeat of Roscrea. On 17 May 1981, Meyler was at midfield when St Finbarr's were defeated by Ballyhale Shamrocks in the All-Ireland final.

On 13 September 1981, Meyler lined out in his first championship final. He scored three points as St Finbarr's retained the title following a 1-12 to 1-09 defeat of Glen Rovers.

St Finbarr's qualified for a third successive championship final on 10 October 1982. Meyler scored two points in that game as St. Finbarr's retained the title for the second year-in-a-row following a 2-17 to 3-09 defeat of Blackrock. Two weeks after this victory, Meyler was at full-back on the St Finbarr's senior football team that defeated Duhallow by a goal to secure the double. He later won a Munster medal following a defeat of Castleisland Desmonds.

On 30 September 1984, Meyler won his fourth county hurling championship medal after scoring a goal in St Finbarr's 1-15 to 2-04 defeat of Ballyhea.

Meyler won a second football championship medal on 15 September 1985 when St Finbarr's defeated Clonakilty by 1-10 to 0-09 in the final.

Meyler was appointed captain of the St Finbarr's senior football team for the 1986 championship. In spite of losing the county final to Imokilly, St Finbarr's later represented Cork in the provincial championship, with Meyler winning a second Munster medal following a defeat of Kilrossanty in the final. On 17 March 1987, Meyler captained St Finbarr's in the All-Ireland final against Clann na nGael at Croke Park. A narrow three-point win gave him an All-Ireland club medal, while he also had the honour of lifting the Andy Merrigan Cup on behalf of the team.

On 16 October 1988, Meyler won a fifth and final county hurling championship medal following a 3-18 to 2-14 defeat of Glen Rovers in the final.

=== Association football ===
For the early part of the 1978–79 League of Ireland, Meyler was a regular player with Cork Alberts.

=== Inter-county ===
Meyler first played for Wexford at minor level in 1973. A dual player with both the hurlers and Gaelic footballers, he enjoyed little success in this grade. Meyler subsequently joined the Wexford under-21 teams, once again as a dual player, however, he ended his underage career without any silverware.

On 24 May 1981, Meyler made his championship debut with the Wexford senior hurling team in a 2-20 to 0-08 Leinster Championship quarter-final defeat of Dublin.

Meyler transferred to Cork in 1982 and made his championship debut for the Cork senior hurling team on 12 May 1983. He scored a point from centre-forward in a 3-11 to 2-14 Munster Championship semi-final draw with Limerick. Meyler retained his place on the team for the replay victory, however, he was dropped from the starting fifteen for the Munster final defeat of Waterford. In spite of this he was still presented with a winners' medal. Meyler was dropped from the Cork panel for the subsequent All-Ireland Championship.

On 10 November 1985, Meyler won an Oireachtas Cup medal with Cork following a 2-11 to 1-10 defeat of Galway in the final. This led to Meyler being recalled to the Cork team and he made a number of appearances during the 1985-86 National League. He played no role in Cork's successful Munster Championship campaign, however, he was added to the panel for the All-Ireland Championship. On 7 September 1986, Meyler won an All-Ireland medal as a non-playing substitute following Cork's 4-13 to 2-15 defeat of Galway in the final.

== Management and coaching career ==
=== Kerry ===
Meyler began his management career in September 1992 as manager of the Kerry senior hurling team. After finishing in second place in Division 2 of the 1993-93 National League, Kerry were later defeated by Tipperary in the league quarter-final. On 23 May 1993, Meyler led Kerry to their first championship victory in 67 years when they defeated Waterford by 4-13 to 3-13 in the Munster Championship quarter-final.

During the 1994-95 National League, Meyler guided Kerry to a third-placed finish in Division 2 which secured promotion to the top division for the following season. In spite of ultimately being relegated, Kerry defeated reigning All-Ireland champions Clare by 3-07 to 1-08 in their opening Division 1 game.

=== Kilmoyley ===
In 2001, Meyler was appointed manager of the Kilmoyle senior hurling team. In his first season in charge, Meyler guided the club to their first county final in 13 years, where they defeated Ballyheigue on 30 September 2001. It was the club's first championship title in 30 years. Kilmoyley retained the title for the following three seasons with defeats of Lixnaw in 2002 and 2003 and Causeway in 2004. Meyler stepped down as Kilmoyley manager in 2006.

In 2009 Meyler returned to Kilmoyley as trainer of the club's minor hurling team that defeated Ballyduff by 1-12 to 1-06 in the championship final.

Meyler was appointed manager of the Kilmoyley senior team for the 2015 season. On 27 September 2015, he guided the team to their 23rd championship title following a 3-15 to 1-13 defeat of St. Brendan's Ardfert. In 2020 he led Kilmoyley to yet another championship title after a win over holders Causeway in the final.

=== Cork ===
On 9 October 2001, Meyler became a selector as part of Bertie Óg Murphy's Cork senior hurling management team. Cork remained undefeated during the 2002 National League and qualified to play Kilkenny in the final. In the week leading up to the game there had been speculation that Gaelic Players Association member from both teams would stage a protest during the parade before the match with their socks down and jerseys out - offences punishable by fine under the GAA's match regulations. At the last training session before the final, Meyler is alleged to have told Mark Landers, a GPA member and one of the Cork players in favour of the protest, to " take a good look around Páirc Uí Chaoimh because he'd never see it again." Meyler dismissed this comment as "banter." The Cork players went ahead with their pre-match protest before losing the final by a single point.

After Cork tamely exited the championship with a defeat by Galway, senior players Mark Landers and Dónal Óg Cusack began a series of revelations regarding the perceived poor treatment of players from the county board, ranging from the limited issuing of gear to limited access to gyms. There were also complaints about the warnings sent to younger players that joining the Gaelic Players Association would jeopardise their chances of playing with the senior team. Running parallel to the dispute was the search for a new manager after Bertie Óg Murphy stepped down in late September. The unrest of the players had been compounded by the decision of the Cork selectors not to follow Murphy's suit. Three of the four selectors - Pat McDonnell, P. J. Murphy and Meyler - remained in place as they are half-way through a two-year term while Blackrock, as county champions, were set to nominate county secretary Frank Murphy to the selection committee. After calling a players' strike on 30 November 2002, the selectors were eventually forced to resign en bloc; however, their decision was in the balance up until the last minute because Meyler was reluctant to quit.

=== Cork Institute of Technology ===
During the mid 2000s Meyler took charge of the Cork Institute of Technology team in the Cork Senior Hurling Championship.

=== Ballinhassig ===
In 2005, Meyler was coach of the Ballinhassig intermediate hurling team that reached the final of the Cork Premier Intermediate Hurling Championship. A 1-16 to 1-11 defeat of Aghada in the final secured the title. After later securing the Munster title following a defeat of Ballyduff Upper, Meyler guided the team to an All-Ireland final defeat by Dicksboro on 12 February 2006.

=== Wexford ===
==== Senior ====
Meyler was confirmed as manager of the Wexford senior hurling team on 12 October 2006. Wexford's 2007 National League campaign saw the team defeat Galway in the quarter-finals before facing a 2-22 to 2-07 defeat by Kilkenny in the semi-final. In the subsequent championship, Meyler's side were defeated in the Leinster final by Kilkenny before facing a second defeat by Kilkenny in the All-Ireland semi-final.

Meyler's second season in charge saw Wexford endure a disappointing National League campaign which ended in relegation to Division 2. The subsequent Leinster Championship campaign ended with a 5-21 to 0-17 final defeat by Kilkenny. Wexford later exited the All-Ireland Championship at the quarter-final stage following a defeat by Waterford.

On 7 October 2008, Meyler met the Wexford County Board to discuss plans for 2009 under the assumption that he was still manager. As the meeting unfolded it became clear that his services were no longer required and he was informed that players and the County Board no longer had confidence in his ability to manage the affairs of the team. Meyler later said that he "was told that some people didn't want me, players didn't want me and that they had lost confidence in me. Maybe I could have done things better, I accept that. But that's the way it goes."

==== Intermediate ====
Meyler's tenure as Wexford senior manager was coupled with the position of manager of the Wexford intermediate hurling team also. He guided the team to the Leinster title in 2008 following a 2-14 to 1-12 defeat of Kilkenny. On 25 August 2007, Meyler led Wexford to a 1-11 to 1-09 defeat of Waterford in the All-Ireland final.

=== Return to Kerry ===
==== Under-21 ====
In 2009 Meyler was appointed manager of the Kerry under-21 hurling team. On 12 September 2009, he guided Kerry to the All-Ireland title following a 2-18 to 1-15 defeat of Roscommon. It was the first of three successive All-Ireland titles for Meyler's under-21 team.

==== Senior ====
On 2 December 2009, Meyler made a return to senior inter-county management when he was appointed manager of the Kerry senior hurling team in succession to Mossie Carroll. In his first season in charge, Meyler managed Kerry to the Division 3A title and promotion to Division 2. Later in the season he guided the team to a first-ever appearance in the Christy Ring Cup final, however, Kerry were defeated by Westmeath by 2-16 to 1-18.

After maintaining their Division 2 status at the end of the 2011 National League, Meyler guided Kerry to a second successive Christy Ring Cup final and a 2-21 to 2-08 defeat of Wicklow.

Meyler's Kerry had an indifferent league campaign in 2012. Midway through the campaign he excluded Mikey, Pádraig and Liam Boyle from the panel for reportedly playing a game of soccer. Meyler explained the decision by saying that he “can no longer select players who are not 100% committed to the Kerry hurling panel.” Kerry retained their Division 2A status before exiting the Christy Ring Cup after a defeat by Kildare. Meyler resigned as manager immediately after the defeat stating: "I have given it 100% and have no more to give. I have done my time – I can't get anymore out of them. What I want and what I got is not enough for me."

=== Ireland ===
Meyler was appointed as a selector to the Ireland under-21 hurling team that defeated Scotland in the 2010 series.

In 2011, Meyler was added as a selector to the Ireland national hurling team under the management of Joe Dooley. Ireland won the two-game series on an aggregate score line of 3–25 to 3–19.

Meyler took over as joint-manager of the Ireland team with Michael Walsh in 2012. Ireland retained the international title after an 11–21 to 6–12 aggregate defeat of Scotland in the two-game series.

For the 2013 international series, Meyler was appointed manager of the team in his own right. Ireland won a fifth successive series after a 5-27 to 2-26 aggregate victory over Scotland.

=== Courcey Rovers ===
In 2011 Meyler was trainer of the Courcey Rovers intermediate hurling team. On 9 October 2011, Courcey Rovers won the Cork Premier Intermediate Championship following a 0-15 to 1-09 defeat of Youghal in the final. Meyler remained as trainer of the Courcey Rovers team for a further two seasons.

=== Carlow ===
On 6 September 2013, Meyler was appointed manager of the Carlow senior hurling team. After a disappointing 2013 National League campaign in which Carlow lost all of their group stage games, Carlow were eventually relegated to Division 2A after a play-off defeat by Antrim. In the subsequent championship campaign, Meyler's side exited following a two-point qualifier defeat by Wexford.

Meyler's second season in charge saw Carlow qualify for the National League Division 2A final, however, they were defeated by Kerry on a 3-16 to 3-13 scoreline. Carlow later failed to qualify for the Leinster Championship proper after finishing third in the preliminary group stage. On 9 July 2014, the Carlow County Board announced that Meyler had stepped down as manager.

=== Inniscarra ===
Meyler managed the Inniscarra intermediate hurling team during the 2016 championship.

=== Return to Cork ===
==== Under-21 ====
In September 2016, Meyler was appointed manager of the Cork under-21 hurling team. On 13 July 2017, Cork began their Munster Championship campaign with a last-minute 2-17 to 1-19 semi-final defeat of Waterford. On 26 July, Cork faced Limerick in the Munster final. The game ended in a 0-16 to 1-11 defeat for Meyler's side.

==== Senior ====
===== 2017 season =====
Meyler's appointment as Cork under-21 manager led to him being added to Kieran Kingston's Cork senior management team as a selector. On 9 July 2017, Cork won the Munster title following a 1-25 to 1-20 defeat of Clare in the final.

===== 2018 season =====
On 19 October 2017, Meyler was announced as the manager of the Cork senior hurling team for a two-year term after the stepping down of Kingston. His first match in charge was a 2-23 to 1-21 loss to Limerick in the pre-season Munster League. Cork later went undefeated in the new Munster Championship round robin. Meyler guided the team to their second successive Munster final, where they defeated Clare on 1 July 2018 to win the title by 2-24 to 1-19. Cork went on to lose the subsequent All Ireland Semi Final to Limerick after extra time.

===== 2019 season =====
Prior to the start of the 2019 season, Meyler identified winning the All-Ireland Championship as his primary aim. His panel of players saw some changes in personnel with the retirement of Lorcán McLoughlin and the return of former captain Stephen McDonnell. Colm Spillane, Michael Cahalane, Mark Ellis and Darragh Fitzgibbon were also first-team absentees for the early part of the season due to a combination of injury, travel and club commitments.

Cork began the season with back-to-back defeats by Clare and Waterford in the pre-season Munster Hurling League. Meyler's side later finished bottom of the Division 1A table of the National League with two wins from five matches and missed out on a place in the quarter-finals. On 16 March 2019, Cork ended their league campaign with a 2-15 to 1-16 defeat of Kilkenny in a play-off at Nowlan Park. Meyler resigned as Cork Senior Hurling team manager after a defeat to Kilkenny in the All Ireland Quarter Finals.

== Personal life ==
Meyler married international swimmer Stella Bowles in December 1983 and the couple have two children: David, a professional footballer; and Sarah. Meyler is a lecturer at Cork Institute of Technology.

== Career statistics ==
=== As a manager ===
As of match played 14 July 2019.

Managerial league-championship record by team and tenure
| Team | From | To | Record | | | | |
| Team | From | To | P | W | D | L | Win % |
|---|---|---|---|---|---|---|---|
| Wexford | 12 October 2006 | 7 October 2008 | 20 | 8 | 2 | 10 | 40.0 |
| Kerry | 2 December 2009 | 12 May 2012 | 28 | 17 | 0 | 11 | 60.7 |
| Carlow | 6 September 2012 | 9 July 2014 | 19 | 6 | 1 | 12 | 31.6 |
| Cork | 19 October 2017 | 31 July 2019 | 33 | 16 | 2 | 15 | 48.5 |

== Honours ==
=== As a player ===
St Finbarr's

- All-Ireland Senior Club Football Championship (1): 1987 (c)
- Munster Senior Club Football Championship (1): 1986 (c)
- Munster Senior Club Hurling Championship (1): 1979
- Cork Senior Hurling Championship (5): 1980, 1981, 1982, 1984, 1988
- Cork Senior Football Championship (2): 1982, 1985

Cork

- All-Ireland Senior Hurling Championship (1): 1986
- Munster Senior Hurling Championship (1): 1983
- Oireachtas Cup 1985

=== In management ===
Kilmoyley

- Kerry Senior Hurling Championship (7): 2001, 2002, 2003, 2004, 2015, 2020, 2021
- Munster Intermediate Club Hurling Championship (1) 2021
- Munster Senior Club Hurling League (1) 2003
- Kerry Minor Hurling Championship (1): 2009

Ballinhassig

- Munster Intermediate Club Hurling Championship (1): 2005
- Cork Premier Intermediate Hurling Championship (1): 2005

Courcey Rovers

- Cork Premier Intermediate Hurling Championship (1): 2011

Wexford

- All-Ireland Intermediate Hurling Championship (1): 2007
- Leinster Intermediate Hurling Championship (1): 2007

Kerry

- Christy Ring Cup (1): 2011
- National Hurling League Division 3A (1): 2010
- All-Ireland Under-21 B Hurling Championship (3): 2009, 2010, 2011

Cork

- Munster Senior Hurling Championship (1): 2018

Ireland

- Shinty/Hurling International Series (3): 2011, 2012, 2013
- Shinty/Hurling Under-21 International Series (1): 2010

Achievements
| Preceded by Tommy McGovern | All-Ireland Senior Club Football Final winning captain 1987 | Succeeded by Vincent McGovern |
Sporting positions
| Preceded by Gerry McManus | Kerry Senior Hurling Manager; 1992–1997 | Succeeded by P. J. O'Grady |
| Preceded by Séamus Murphy | Wexford Senior Hurling Manager; 2006–2008 | Succeeded by Colm Bonnar |
| Preceded by Mossie Carroll | Kerry Senior Hurling Manager; 2009–2012 | Succeeded by Tom Howard |
| Preceded by Kevin Ryan | Carlow Senior Hurling Manager; 2012–2014 | Succeeded by Pat English |
| Preceded by Kieran Kingston | Cork Senior Hurling Manager; 2017-2019 | Succeeded by Kieran Kingston |
