= Liam Boyle (2000s hurler) =

Irish hurler and Gaelic footballer

Personal information
- Born: Ballyduff, County Kerry

Sport
- Sport: Hurling
- Position: Forward
Club
- Years: Club
- Ballyduff
Club titles
- Kerry titles: 4
Inter-county
| Years | County | Apps (scores) |
| 2003-2012 | Kerry | 13(1-17) |
Inter-county titles
- Munster titles: 0
- All-Irelands: 0

Liam Boyle is a hurler who played with Ballyduff and Kerry. His family are involved in hurling and football in North Kerry, and he has played both football and hurling with Kerry.

== Club ==
=== Hurling ===
With Ballyduff Boyle won a County Senior Championship in 2006 when they beat Causeway 1-17 to 1-11 to give Ballyduff title since 1995, he added a second in 2010. He also won Minor County Championships in 1996 and 1998.

=== Football ===
Boyle was a member of the Ballyduff side that won back to back North Kerry Senior Football Championship title in 2005 and 2006 when they over came Listowel Emmets in both finals.

== Inter-county ==
=== Hurling ===
Boyle is a member of the Kerry Senior hurling team and has also played Minor and U21 for Kerry. In 2003 he played in Croke Park in the National Hurling League Div 2 final only to lose out to Antrim by 3-18 to 3-12. He was the team caption in 2007 after Ballyduff County Championship win in 2006.

=== Football ===
Boyle was a member of the Kerry Minor team in 1998 and won a Munster Championship medal that year. He also played U21 with the county.

== Honours ==
Club hurling

- Kerry Senior Hurling Championship 4: 2006, 2010–12
- County Minor Championship 2: 1996, 1998
- North Kerry Senior Hurling Championship 3: 2000, 2004, 2006

Club football

- North Kerry Senior Football Championship 2: 2005, 2006

Intercounty hurling

- Kerry Caption: 2007

Intercounty football

- Munster Minor Championship 1: 1998

Sporting positions
| Preceded by Michael Conway | Kerry Senior Hurling Captain; 2007 | Succeeded by John Griffin |
