= Michael Slattery (hurler) =

Irish hurler

Personal information
- Nickname: Boxer
- Born: County Kerry, Ireland

Sport
- Sport: Hurling
- Position: Forward
Club
- Years: Club
- Ballyheigue
Club titles
- Kerry titles: 3
Inter-county
Years	County	Apps (scores)
1997-2008	Kerry	17 (4-61)
Inter-county titles
- Munster titles: 0
- All-Irelands: 0
- NHL: 1 (Div 2)
- All Stars: 0

Michael "Boxer" Slattery is a hurler from County Kerry in Ireland. He has played with Ballyheigue and the Kerry senior team.

== Club career ==
Slattery has won 3 County Senior Championships with Ballyheigue in 1996, 1997 and 2000 when he was captain. He has also won a number of North Kerry League and Championship medals with Ballyheigue. He also won four u-21 championships and a county minor medal with his club.

== Intercounty career ==
Slattery was a member of the Kerry Senior team for a number of years and was captain of the team that won the NHL Div 2 title in 2001 when Kerry beat Westmeath on a score line of 4-14 to 3-10 at Croke Park Slattery scoring 1-10 of his sides total. In 2003 he was Kerrys top scorer in the championship with 3-23 with put him 4th in Munster along with the likes of Joe Deane, Paul Flynn and Eoin Kelly. He was also on two losing league final teams in 2003 and 2006. He was a member of the Munster Railway Cup team in 1998.

== Club ==
- County Senior Hurling Championship 3: 1996, 1997, 2000
- County Senior Hurling Championship Winning Captain:2000
- County Junior Hurling Championship 1: 2018
- County U21 Hurling Championship 4: 1994, 1995, 1996, 1997
- County Minor Hurling Championship 1: 1992
- County Senior Hurling League (Div.1) 4: 1996, 2002, 2005, 2011
- North Kerry Senior Championship 3: 1995, 1996, 1999
- North Kerry Senior League 4: 1996, 2000, 2002, 2007

== Intercounty ==
- National Hurling League (Div 2): 2001
- Kerry Senior Hurling Team Caption: 2001

Sporting positions
Preceded by	Kerry Senior Hurling Captain; 2001	Succeeded by James McCarthy
