= Michael Conway (hurler) =

Irish hurler

Sport
- Sport: Hurling
- Position: Forward
Club
- Years: Club
- 1990s–present 1990s-present: Lixnaw Finuge
Club titles
- Kerry titles: 3 (2 hurling, 1 football)
Inter-county
- Years: County
- Kerry
Inter-county titles
- Munster titles: 0
- All-Irelands: 0

Michael Conway is a hurler with the Kerry county team.
