= John Mike Dooley =

Irish hurler

Personal information
- Born: Causeway, County Kerry

Sport
- Sport: Hurling
- Position: Forward
Club
- Years: Club
- 1990s-: Causeway
Club titles
- Kerry titles: 3
Inter-county
Years	County	Apps (scores)
1998-2010	Kerry	22(18-22)
Inter-county titles
- Munster titles: 0
- All-Irelands: 0

John Mike Dooley is a hurler from County Kerry. He has played with the Kerry senior team and the Irish Hurling/Shinty Compromise International Rules team. He has also played with his local club, Causeway. He won a league medal with Kerry in 2001 score in a 4-14 to 3-10 win over Westmeath. He made three of his sides' four goals. He won 3 County Senior Championship medals with Causeway in 1998, 2019 and 2022. In 2005, he won Kerry's first Christy Ring Cup All Star.
