= Shane Brick =

Kerry hurler

Personal information
- Born: 1988 or 1989 (age 36–37) County Kerry, Ireland
- Occupation: Teacher
- Height: 6 ft 3 in (191 cm)

Sport
- Sport: Hurling
- Position: Half/Full forward
Clubs
- Years: Club
- Kilmoyley; Tracton
Club titles
- Kerry titles: 6
Inter-county
- Years: County
- 2000s–2012: Kerry
Inter-county titles
- Munster titles: 0
- All-Irelands: 0
- All Stars: 0

Shane Brick (born 1988 or 1989) is a hurler from County Kerry, Ireland. He has played with the Kerry county team, and originally played his club hurling with Kilmoyley. He won six Kerry Senior Hurling Championship medals with Kilmoyley. In 2014, he switched to the southeast of Cork to play with Tracton GAA. He retired from playing in 2016, and joined the management team with Douglas GAA in 2019.

== Inter-county career ==
With the Kerry county hurling team, he won National Hurling League Div 2 (2001) and Div 3A (2010) titles. He was also part of the Kerry team that made the 2010 final of the Christy Ring Cup, which was won by Westmeath. He missed the following years win with an injury, before returning in 2012. He later retired from inter-county hurling.

== Club career ==
Brick originally played club hurling for Kilmoyley in County Kerry, with whom he won several Kerry Senior Hurling Championship titles. He was captain of the 2004 winning team, and was man-of-the-match in three of the wins.

He later moved to Cork and played with Tracton GAA, before returning to Kilmoyley. He retired from playing in 2016.

As of 2020, Brick was on the management team with Douglas GAA in Cork.
