= Kilmoyley GAA =

Gaelic games club in County Kerry, Ireland

Kilmoyley
- Cill Mhaoile
- Founded: 1880s
- County: Kerry
- Colours: Green & Gold
- Grounds: Lerrig
- Coordinates: 52°21′38.61″N 9°46′23.82″W

Playing kits
Standard colours

Senior Club Championships
	All Ireland	Munster champions	Kerry champions
Hurling:	-	-	26

Kilmoyley are a Gaelic Athletic Association club in County Kerry, Ireland. They are located in North Kerry, the county's main hurling area and are primarily hurlers. They are one of the most successful hurling clubs in the county.

The club competes in competitions organized by Kerry GAA county board and the North Division hurling board.

== Hurling Titles ==
- Kerry Senior Club Hurling Championship (26) 1890, 1892, 1894, 1895, 1900, 1901, 1905, 1907, 1910, 1914, 1948, 1962, 1963, 1964, 1970, 1971, 2001, 2002, 2003, 2004, 2008, 2009, 2015, 2016, 2020, 2021.
- Munster Senior Hurling League: (1) 2003
- Munster Intermediate Club Hurling Championship (1) 2021
- All-Ireland Intermediate Club Hurling Championship Runners-up 2022
- Kerry Under-21 hurling championship (5) 1981, 1990, 1993, 1998, 2006, 2011
- Kerry Minor Hurling Championship (13) 1953, 1964, 1978, 1980, 1987, 1989, 1990, 1991, 1993, 1995, 2000, 2007, 2009
- Kerry Intermediate Hurling Championship (9) 1985, 1986, 1987, 1988, 1992, 1994, 2003, 2011, 2015
- Kerry Junior Hurling Championship (1) 1997
- Kerry Senior Hurling League Div I (11) 1986, 1987, 1988, 1990, 1993, 1999, 2000, 2001, 2003, 2004, 2007
- Kerry Senior Hurling League Div II (1) 1986
- Kerry Senior hurling League Div III (3) 1987, 1991, 1995
- Kerry Minor Hurling League Div I (5) 1987, 1990, 1995, 1996, 1999
- Kerry Minor Hurling League Div II (1) 1998, 2004
- Kerry Féile na nGael (13) 1974,1978, 1979, 1980, 1981, 1983, 1985, 1986, 1987, 1990, 1991, 2005, 2006
- All-Ireland Féile na nGael (2) 1987 (Div III), 1991 (Div IV)
- All-Ireland Oireachtas 2001, 2003

== County championship winning captains ==
Senior

- 1890: Jack W. Quane
- 1892: Jack W. Quane
- 1894: John Gurnett
- 1895: Jack W. Quane
- 1900: Patsy O'Rourke
- 1901: Patsy O'Rourke
- 1905: Tim Meehan
- 1907: Pat Meehan
- 1910: Tim Meehan
- 1914: Tim Meehan
- 1948: Mick McGrath
- 1962: Michael Curran
- 1963: John Flanagan
- 1964: Michael Regan
- 1970: Patsy O'Connor
- 1971: Mike Fitzgerald
- 2001: James McCarthy
- 2002: Ian Brick
- 2003: Maurice Murnane
- 2004:Shane Brick
- 2008: Tom Murnane
- 2009: Micheal Regan
- 2015: Sean Maunsell
- 2016: Aiden McCabe
- 2020: John B O’Halloran
- 2021: Flor McCarthy

Under 21

- 1981: John Godley
- 1990: Michael Marshall
- 1993: John Nolan
- 1998: Micheál Regan
- 2006: Tom Murnane
- 2011: John B O'Halloran

Minor

- 1953: Denis Treacy
- 1964: Michael Rahilly
- 1978: Paddy Sullivan
- 1980: Harry Young
- 1987: Eddie Flaherty
- 1989: Francis Maunsell
- 1990: John Clifford
- 1991: Kieran Treacy
- 1993: James McCarthy
- 1995: Tony Maunsell
- 2000: Paul mccarthy
- 2007: David Fitzell
- 2009: Tommy Maunsell

== Notable players ==
- Christy Walsh

== Notable managers ==
- Anthony Daly
- John Meyler
