= Dougie Fitzell =

Irish hurler (born 1994)

Personal information
- Born: 1994 (age 31–32) Kilmoyley, County Kerry, Ireland
- Occupation: Farmer

Sport
- Sport: Hurling
- Position: Left corner-back
Club
- Years: Club
- Kilmoyley
Club titles
- Kerry titles: 0
Inter-county
- Years: County
- 2014-present: Kerry

Douglas Fitzell (born 1994) is an Irish hurler who plays as a left corner-back for the Kerry senior team.

Born in Kilmoyley, County Kerry, Fitzell first played competitive hurling during his schooling at Causeway Comprehensive School. He arrived on the inter-county scene at the age of seventeen when he first linked up with the Kerry minor team before later joining the under-21 side. He made his senior debut during the 2014 league. Fitzell quickly became a regular member of the starting fifteen and has won one Christy Ring Cup medal.

At club level Fitzell plays with Kilmoyley.

== Honours ==
=== Team ===
Kilmoyley

- Kerry Senior Hurling Championship (4): 2015, 2016, 2020, 2021
- Munster Intermediate Club Hurling Championship (1): 2021

Kerry

- Christy Ring Cup (1): 2015
- National League (Division 2A) (1): 2015
- All-Ireland Under 21 B Hurling Championship (1): 2013
- All-Ireland Minor B Hurling Championship (1): 2012
