= Shane Conway =

Irish hurler

Personal information
- Native name: Seán Ó Conbhuí (Irish)
- Born: 26 October 1998 (age 28) Lixnaw, County Kerry, Ireland
- Occupation: Quality assurance engineer
- Height: 5 ft 10 in (178 cm)

Sport
- Sport: Hurling
- Position: Full-forward
Clubs
Years	Club	Apps (scores)
2015-present 2018-2021	Lixnaw → UCC	34 (10-254); 11 (2-82)
Club titles
- Kerry titles: 1
College
Years	College	Apps (scores)
2017-2021	UCC	10 (0-71)
College titles
- Fitzgibbon titles: 2
Inter-county
- Years: County
- 2018-present: Kerry
Inter-county titles
- NHL: 0
- All Stars: 0

Shane Conway (born 26 October 1998) is an Irish hurler who plays for Kerry Senior Championship club Lixnaw and at inter-county level with the Kerry senior hurling team. He usually lines out as a forward.

== Career ==
A member of the Lixnaw club, Conway first came to prominence at underage levels by winning minor and under-21 championship titles. He progressed onto the club's senior team and won a County Championship title in 2018. Conway subsequently lined out with University College Cork, winning consecutive Fitzgibbon Cup titles in 2019 and 2020. He first came to prominence on the inter-county scene as a member of the Kerry minor and under-21 teams that won All-Ireland titles in the respective second tier championships. He made his debut with the Kerry senior hurling team in 2018.

== Career statistics ==
=== Club ===
As of match played 27 June 2024

Team	Season	Kerry		Munster		All-Ireland		Total	
Team	Season	Apps	Score	Apps	Score	Apps	Score	Apps	Score
Lixnaw	2015	3	1-07	—		—		3	1-07
Lixnaw	2016	3	1-03	—		—		3	1-03
Lixnaw	2017	5	2-35	—		—		5	2-35
Lixnaw	2018	5	1-58	2	0-21	—		7	1-79
Lixnaw	2019	4	4-40	—		—		4	4-40
Lixnaw	2020	1	0-09	—		—		1	0-09
Lixnaw	2021	4	0-35	—		—		4	0-35
Lixnaw	2022	2	0-06	—		—		2	0-06
Lixnaw	2023	4	0-33	—		—		4	0-33
Lixnaw	2024	1	1-07	—		—		1	1-07
Total		32	10-233	2	0-21	—		34	10-254

=== Inter-county ===
As of match played 25 May 2024

Team	Year	National League			McDonagh Cup		All-Ireland		Total	
Team	Year	Division	Apps	Score	Apps	Score	Apps	Score	Apps	Score
Kerry	2018	Division 2A	4	1-21	5	0-36	—		9	1-57
Kerry	2019	Division 2A	4	2-45	4	0-44	—		8	2-89
Kerry	2020	Division 2A	5	1-49	5	2-45	—		10	3-94
Kerry	2021	Division 2A	3	1-28	3	1-22	—		6	2-50
Kerry	2022	Division 2A	6	1-41	6	3-24	1	0-00	13	4-65
Kerry	2023	Division 2A	6	1-27	5	0-38	—		11	1-65
Kerry	2024	Division 2A	1	1-09	0	0-00	—		1	1-09
Career total			29	8-220	28	6-209	1	0-00	58	14-429

== Honours ==
University College Cork

- Fitzgibbon Cup: 2019, 2020
- Canon O'Brien Cup: 2020

Lixnaw

- Kerry Senior Hurling Championship: 2018
- Kerry Under-21 hurling championship: 2016
- Kerry Minor Hurling Championship: 2014, 2015

Finuge

- Kerry Junior Football Championship: 2026

Kerry

- All-Ireland Under-21 B Hurling Championship: 2017, 2018
- All-Ireland Minor B Hurling Championship: 2015, 2016

Awards

- Bord Gáis Energy All-Ireland Under-21 B Hurler of the Year: 2017
- Electric Ireland Higher Education GAA Rising Stars Hurling Team of the Year: 2019, 2020
- GAA/GPA Joe McDonagh Cup Team of the Year: 2020, 2021
- Fitzgibbon Cup Player of the year: 2019
