= 2017 Munster Senior Hurling Championship final =

- Event: 2017 Munster Senior Hurling Championship
Cork	Clare
1–25	1–20
- Date: 9 July 2017
- Venue: Semple Stadium, Thurles
- Man of the Match: Alan Cadogan
- Referee: Fergal Horgan (Tipperary)
- Attendance: 45,558
- Weather: Raining, 28 degrees Celsius, humid.

The 2017 Munster Senior Hurling Championship final was played on 9 July 2017 at Semple Stadium, Thurles. The winner advanced to the semi-finals of the All-Ireland Senior Hurling Championship, with the loser entering the All-Ireland quarter-finals.

Clare and Cork contested the final, It was the first final between the sides since Cork's 1–15 to 0–14 win in 1999.

Cork, captained by Stephen McDonnell, won the game on a 1–25 to 1–20 scoreline to claim their 53rd Munster title.

== Route to the final ==
=== Clare ===
4 June 2017
16:00
Semi-final

Limerick	2-16 - 3-17	Clare
S Dowling 0-7 (0-7f), D Dempsey, K Hayes 1-1 each, P Browne (0-1 sideline), C Lynch 0-2 each, P Casey, P Ryan, B Nash 0-1 each.	Report	S O’Donnell 2-2, C McGrath 1-3, D Reidy 0-5 (0-5f), J Conlon 0-2, C Cleary, I Galvin, J McCarthy, C Galvin 0-1 each.

Semple Stadium, Thurles
Attendance: 19,168
Referee: J McGrath (Westmeath)

=== Cork ===
21 May 2017
16:00
Quarter-final

Tipperary	1-26 - 2-27	Cork
M Breen, S Callanan (4f) 0-6 each, J McGrath 1-1, D McCormack, N McGrath 0-3 each, J O'Dwyer (1 sideline), B Maher 0-2 each, P Maher, N O'Meara, S Curran 0-1 each.	Report	C Lehane (0-4f, 1'65) 0-10, S Kingston 1-4, P Horgan 0-4, M Cahalane 1-0, A Cadogan, L Meade 0-3 each, S Harnedy 0-2, L O'Farrell 0-1.

Semple Stadium, Thurles
Attendance: 30,103
Referee: J Owens (Wexford)
18 June 2017
16:00
Semi-final

Waterford	1-15 – 0-23	Cork
P Mahony 0-5 (0-1f), M Shanahan 1-1 (0-1f), S Bennett, A Gleeson, J Barron 0-2 each, B O’Halloran, S Bennett, K Moran 0-1 each.	Report	P Horgan 0-10 (0-7f, 0-1 ’65), C Lehane 0-4, S Harnedy 0-2, M Ellis, M Coleman (0-1 sideline), B Cooper, D Fitzgibbon, A Cadogan, M Cahalane, L O’Farrell 0-1 each.

Semple Stadium, Thurles
Attendance: 33,163
Referee: B Kelly (Westmeath)

== Build-up ==
Ticket prices for the final ranged from €35 to €40 in the stand and €30 in the terrace. The game was set to be the first sellout for a Munster senior hurling final at Semple Stadium since 2006.

The match was shown live on RTÉ One as part of The Sunday Game Live, with commentary from Marty Morrissey and Brendan Cummins.

Clare were looking for their first Munster title since 1998, while Cork's last victory was in 2014. Cork manager Kieran Kingston was in his second year as manager, with Clare's joint managers Donal Moloney and Gerry O'Connor in their first year in charge.

== Team selection ==
Conor Lehane had been a doubt for Cork but was named in the starting line-up for the final in an unchanged Cork team. Clare made two changes from the team that beat Limerick in the semi-final, with Cathal Malone replacing David Reidy and Oisín O'Brien starting instead of Gearóid O'Connell.

== Match ==
=== Summary ===
Cork playing with the wind in the first half had a five-point lead at half time on a 1–10 to 0–8 scoreline with the Cork goal coming from Alan Cadogan when he broke free of Clare defender Oisin O’Brien before firing a low shot to the right from out on the left which went across Clare goalkeeper Andrew Fahy and into the net. Cadogan had scored 1–2 from play in the first half with his marker Oisin O’Brien being withdrawn and replaced with Séadna Morey. Clare were awarded a penalty in the 19th minute when Shane O'Donnell was fouled, but Tony Kelly hit his shot over the bar when he was going for a goal. Cork were three points ahead with ten minutes to go after a point by John Conlon and also three ahead with three minutes to go. Conor McGrath then got another point to cut the gap to two points before Cork scored three late points to seal the victory.

=== Details ===
9 July 2017
Final
16:00

Cork	1-25 - 1-20	Clare
P Horgan 0-13 (0-10f), A Cadogan 1-4, Mark Coleman (0-1 sideline) and S Harnedy 0-2 each, D Fitzgibbon, S Kingston, C Lehane and L Meade 0-1 each	Report	T Kelly 0-10 (0-6f, 0-1pen), C McGrath 1-1, J Conlon 0-2, P Collins, A Cunningham, C Galvin, J McCarthy, D McInerney, S Morey and A Shanagher 0-1 each.

Semple Stadium
Attendance: 45,558
Referee: Fergal Horgan (Tipperary)
