= 2022 Kerry Senior Hurling Championship =

Annual hurling competition season

- Dates: 24 June – 7 August 2022
- Teams: 9
- Sponsor: Garvey's SuperValu
- Champions: Causeway (9th title); Jason Diggins (captain); Stephen Goggin (manager)
- Runners-up: Ballyduff; Daniel O'Carroll (captain); Garry O'Brien (manager)

Tournament statistics
- Matches played: 14
- Goals scored: 38 (2.71 per match)
- Points scored: 449 (32.07 per match)
- Top scorer(s): Pádraig Boyle (1-45)

The 2022 Kerry Senior Hurling Championship was the 121st staging of the Kerry Senior Hurling Championship since its establishment by the Kerry County Board in 1889. The draw for the group stage pairings took place on 26 May 2022. The championship ran from 24 June to 7 August 2022.

Kilmoyley entered the championship as the defending champions, however, they were beaten by Causeway at the semi-final stage.

The final was played on 7 August 2022 at Austin Stack Park in Tralee, between Causeway and Ballyduff, in what was their sixth meeting in the final overall and a first final meeting in 16 years. Causeway won the match by 2–15 to 0–16 to claim their ninth championship title overall and a first title in three years.

Ballyduff's Pádraig Boyle was the championship's top scorer with 1-45.

== Group A ==
=== Group A table ===
Advance to knockout stage

Team	Matches				Score			Pts
Team	Pld	W	D	L	For	Against	Diff	Pts
Ballyduff	2	1	1	0	36	28	8	3
Causeway	2	1	1	0	32	26	6	3
St Brendan's	2	0	0	2	26	40	-14	0

=== Group A results ===
25 June 2022 Round 1	Causeway	2-12 - 0-12	St Brendan's	Austin Stack Park
	G Dooley 2-1, C Harty 0-4, P McGrath 0-3, G Carey 0-2, K Carmody 0-1, D Goggin 0-1.		K Hanafin 0-6, N O'Driscoll 0-3, J Egan 0-1, T Moloney 0-1.

3 July 2022 Round 2	Ballyduff	1-11 - 0-14	Causeway	Austin Stack Park
	K O'Carroll 1-3, P Boyle 0-3, D Goulding 0-2, A Curley 0-1, K Goulding 0-1, D O'Carroll 0-1.		P McGrath 0-8, D Goggin 0-3, J Diggins 0-1, T Casey 0-1, T Barrett 0-1.

9 July 2022 Round 3	Ballyduff	0-22 - 0-14	St Brendan's	Austin Stack Park
	P Boyle 0-12, D Goulding 0-2, D O'Carroll 0-2, K Goulding 0-2, M Boyle 0-1, K O'Carroll 0-1, Kyle O'Connor 0-1, Kevin O'Connor 0-1.		K Hanafin 0-6, E Leen 0-3, E Ferris 0-1, J Egan 0-1, D Dineen 0-1, S Brosnan 0-1, C Healy 0-1.

== Group B ==
=== Group B table ===
Advance to knockout stage

Team	Matches				Score			Pts
Team	Pld	W	D	L	For	Against	Diff	Pts
Kilmoyley	2	1	1	0	49	30	19	3
Abbeydorney	2	1	1	0	41	36	5	3
Dr Crokes	2	0	0	2	36	60	-24	0

=== Group B results ===
25 June 2022 Round 1	Abbeydorney	0-15 - 0-15	Kilmoyley	Austin Stack Park
	M O'Leary 0-12, J Hannon 0-1, D Egan 0-1, B O'Leary 0-1.		M O'Connor 0-5, J Brick 0-4, T Murnane 0-1, B O'Sullivan 0-1, R Walsh 0-1, D Nolan 0-1, A Royle 0-1, R Monahan 0-1.

2 July 2022 Round 2	Abbeydorney	4-14 - 4-09	Dr Crokes	Austin Stack Park
	K O'Connor 1-10, D Egan 2-2, J Hannon 1-1, B O'Leary 0-1.		M Heffernan 2-8, T Doyle 2-0, D Hickey 0-1.

8 July 2022 Round 3	Dr Crokes	1-12 - 3-25	Kilmoyley	Austin Stack Park
	M Heffernan 0-7, J Lenihan 1-1, V Doyle 0-2, M Lenihan 0-2.		M O'Connor 2-7, A Royle 1-3, R Monahan 0-5, R Walsh 0-4, B O'Sullivan 0-3, J Brick 0-2, P O'Connor 0-1.

== Group C ==
=== Group C table ===
Advance to knockout stage

Team	Matches				Score			Pts
Team	Pld	W	D	L	For	Against	Diff	Pts
Crotta O'Neill's	2	2	0	0	45	28	17	4
Ballyheigue	2	1	0	1	31	39	-8	2
Lixnaw	2	0	0	2	32	41	-9	0

=== Group C results ===
24 June 2022 Round 1	Crotta O'Neill's	2-16 - 1-10	Ballyheigue	Austin Stack Park
	S Nolan 0-10, Declan O'Donoghue 2-1, J Conway 0-2, Darragh O'Donoghue 0-1, J Sheehan 0-1, S Weir 0-1.		N Guerin 0-9, P Lucid 1-0, F O'Sullivan 0-1.

3 July 2022 Round 2	Crotta O'Neill's	1-20 - 0-15	Lixnaw	Austin Stack Park
	S Nolan 0-12, Declan O'Donoghue 1-4, T O'Connor 0-1, C Trant 0-1, S Weir 0-1, D Kennelly 0-1.		R Heffernan 0-4, J Griffin 0-3, S Conway 0-3, B Brosnan 0-3, J Buckley 0-1, J Flaherty 0-1.

9 July 2022 Round 3	Lixnaw	0-17 - 2-12	Ballyheigue	Austin Stack Park
	R Heffernan 0-9, S Conway 0-3, J Buckley 0-1, B Brosnan 0-1, J McKenna 0-1, J Griffin 0-1, J Flaherty 0-1.		E Walsh 1-2, M Leane 1-1, N Guerin 0-4, P Lucid 0-2, F O'Sullivan 0-2, B O'Riordan 0-1.

== Knockout stage ==
=== Quarter-finals ===
17 July 2022 Quarter-final	Causeway	3-16 - 2-16	Ballyheigue	Austin Stack Park
	D Goggin 3-2, P McGrath 0-6, G Dooley 0-3, C Harty 0-2, T Casey 0-1, B Barrett 0-1, J Diggins 0-1.	Report	N Guerin 1-6, P Lucid 0-4, M Leane 1-0, F O'Sullivan 0-2, B O'Riordan 0-1, C Walsh 0-1, D O'Mahony 0-1, D Walsh 0-1.

17 July 2022 Quarter-final	Ballyduff	0-26 - 3-15	Abbeydorney	Austin Stack Park
	P Boyle 0-13, E Ross 0-3, K Goulding 0-3, M Boyle 0-2, K O'Carroll 0-1, J O'Sullivan 0-1, S O'Connor 0-1, D Goulding 0-1, K O'Connor 0-1.	Report	M O'Leary 0-8, M Slattery 1-2, J Sheehan 1-1, S O'Sullivan 1-0, T Ó hAiniféin 0-1, K Dineen 0-1, R Donovan 0-1, J Maunsell 0-1.

=== Semi-finals ===
22 July 2022 Semi-final	Ballyduff	2-18 - 1-16	Crotta O'Neill's	Austin Stack Park
	M Boyle (1-3), P Boyle (1-7, 3f, 1 65’), K O’Carroll and K Goulding (0-2 each), D Goulding, K O’Connor, E Ross and D O’Carroll (0-1 each)	Report	S Nolan (1-6, 1-4f), B Mahony (0-3), J Sheehan, D O’Donoghue, C Trant, J Conway, D Nolan and S Weir (0-1 each)	Referee: M Sexton (Limerick)

23 July 2022 Semi-final	Causeway	3-21 - 1-25 (aet)	Kilmoyley	Austin Stack Park
	B Barrett (1-8, 4f’s, 1’65), G Dooley (2-1), P McGrath (0-5), Joseph Diggins (0-3), D Goggin, D Mahoney, K Carmody and G Carey (f) 0-1 each.	Report	D Collins (0-11, 10f’s), R Monahan (1-6), B O’Sullivan (0-3), J Brick (0-2), K McCarthy, R Walsh and D Nolan (0-1 each).	Referee: C O'Regan (Cork)

=== Final ===
7 August 2022 Final	Causeway	2-15 - 0-16	Ballyduff	Austin Stack Park
	B Barrett (1-7, 7 frees), C Harty (1-1), P McGrath (0-3), D Goggin (0-2), G Dooley (0-1).	Report	P Boyle (0-10, 8 frees, 2 ’65s), E Ross (0-2), K O’Connor, K Goulding. J O’Sullivan, and D Carroll (0-1 each).	Referee: J O'Halloran (Limerick)

== Championship statistics ==
=== Top scorers ===
Overall

Rank	Player	County	Tally	Total	Matches	Average
1	Pádraig Boyle	Ballyduff	1-45	48	5	9.60
2	Shane Nolan	Crotta O'Neill's	1-28	31	3	10.33
3	Paul McGrath	Causeway	0-25	25	5	5.00
4	Brandon Barrett	Causeway	2-16	22	3	7.33
5	Nathan Guerin	Ballyheigue	1-19	22	3	7.33
6	Mark Heffernan	Dr Crokes	2-15	21	2	10.50
7	Michael O'Leary	Abbeydorney	0-20	20	2	10.00
8	Gavin Dooley	Causeway	4-06	18	5	3.60
8	Dan Goggin	Causeway	3-09	18	5	3.60
8	Maurice O'Connor	Kilmoyley	2-12	18	3	6.00

Single game

Rank	Player	Club	Tally	Total	Opposition
1	Mark Heffernan	Dr Crokes	2-08	14	Abbeydorney
2	Maurice O'Connor	Kilmoyley	2-07	13	Dr Crokes
3	Keith O'Connor	Abbeydorney	1-10	13	Dr Crokes
3	Pádraig Boyle	Ballyduff	0-13	13	Abbeydorney
5	Shane Nolan	Crotta O'Neill's	0-12	12	Lixnaw
5	Michael O'Leary	Abbeydorney	0-12	12	Kilmoyley
5	Pádraig Boyle	Ballyduff	0-12	12	St Brendan's
8	Brandon Barrett	Causeway	1-08	11	Kilmoyley
8	Daniel Collins	Kilmoyley	0-11	11	Causeway
10	Pádraig Boyle	Ballyduff	1-07	10	Crotta O'Neill's
10	Brandon Barrett	Causeway	1-07	10	Ballyduff
10	Pádraig Boyle	Ballyduff	0-10	10	Causeway
10	Shane Nolan	Crotta O'Neill's	0-10	10	Ballyheigue

=== Miscellaneous ===
- Ballyheigue's 2-12 to 0-17 defeat of Lixnaw in Group C was their first championship victory in 11 years.
