= Daniel Collins (hurler) =

Irish hurler

Personal information
- Native name: Dónall Ó Coileáin (Irish)
- Born: 1994 (age 31–32) Kilmoyley, County Kerry, Ireland
- Occupation: Farmer

Sport
- Sport: Hurling
- Position: Center Half Forward
Club
- Years: Club
- 201?-: Kilmoyley Ardfert
Club titles
- Kerry titles: 4
Inter-county
- Years: County
- 2013-present: Kerry

Daniel "Danny" Collins (born 1994) is an Irish hurler who plays as a center half forward for the Kerry senior team.

Born in Kilmoyley, County Kerry, Collins first played competitive hurling during his schooling at Causeway Comprehensive School.

== Club ==
Collins had enjoyed much success at club level in both football and hurling with Ardfert and Kilmoyley. As well as underage success with St Brendan's District.

In 2012 he won a Kerry Minor Football title with the St Brendan's District team after a win over Kenmare District in the final.

His first major senior success came when he won a Kerry Intermediate Football Championship in 2014 after a win over Spa in the final, He later added a Munster Intermediate Club Football Championship title after a win over Valley Rovers from Cork in the final. He later lined out in Croke Park as Ardfet faced St. Croan's from Roscommon in the All-Ireland Intermediate Club Football Championship final. A 1–14 to 0–09 win saw Collins pick up an All-Ireland winners medal.

He lined out in the 2014 Kerry Senior Hurling Championship final where his side faced Lixnaw. His first senior final ended in disappointment as he was on the losing side after a re-play.

[[Kilmoyley GAA|Kilmoyley]] were back in the final in 2015 where they faced St Brendan's Ardfert. Collins was in fine form as he helped himself to 2–10 in a 3–15 to 1–13 win to land his first county title.

Kilmoyley qualified for a third final in a row in 2016 where they faced off with Ballyduff. The sided finished level 1–17 to 2-14 Collins who his second title after a replay win on a 1–18 to 2–13 win. Kilmoyley overcame Limerick champions Monaleen to book a place in the Munster Intermediate Club Hurling Championship. In the final Collins and co faced Waterford champions [[Lismore GAA|Lismore]] in Mallow. Despite scoring all of his side's points, 0–13 in total, it wasn't enough as the title went to Waterford on a 2–14 to 0–13 scoreline.

A 2018 final loss to Lixnaw was Collins and co lot for the next few seasons.

Kilmoyley were back in the final once more in 2020, where the faced holders Causeway.

== Underage ==
Collins played both football and hurling at minor level with Kerry.

He arrived on the inter-county scene at the age of sixteen when he first linked up with the Kerry minor hurling team. His first success came when he won an All-Ireland Minor B Hurling Championship title in 2012 after a final win over Roscommon.

He also lined out with the minor footballers in 2012. His only appearance was as a sub against Limerick.

He would later join the under-21 side and had some success. In 2013 he was part of the team that won the All-Ireland Under-21 B Hurling Championship after beating Kildare in the final.

== Senior ==
He made his senior debut during the 2013 league. Collins quickly became a regular member of the starting fifteen as Kerry qualified for the Christy Ring Cup final where they faced Down where Collins lined out at midfield. Despite being favorites Collins side lost out on a 3–16 to 2–17 scoreline.

He was a regular member of the starting fifteen during 2014 league. Collins helped Kerry qualify for the National League (Division 2A) final where they faced Carlow. Despite being underdogs Collins side took the title on a 3–16 to 3–13 scoreline. Kerry would subsequently lose a controversial Promotion/relegation play-off with Offaly. Collins and co regrouped for the Christy Ring Cup. Wins over Derry, Kildare and Mayo seen Kerry qualify for a second final in a row. In the Final Kerry again faced Kildare. Like in 2013 Collins and co came into the game as big favorites, however it was Kildare's goals that made the difference as they took the title on a 4–18 to 2–22 scoreline.

For the second season in a row Kerry qualified for the National League (Division 2A) final where they this time faced Westmeath. Collins and co powered to a 5–17 to 3–17 win to win a second league title. Kerry would again have to play a controversial Promotion/relegation play-off with Antrim. However where the Kingdom fell short to Offaly in 2014 it was to be different as Collins and co had a famous 2–16 to 1–18 win at Parnell Park to book a place in Division 1B for 2016. Kerry went into the 2015 Christy Ring Cup as hot favorites having lost the two previous finals. Wins over Down, Meath and a huge semi-final win over Kildare seen Kerry in the final for the fourth time in six seasons. The 2015 Christy Ring Cup Final with Derry was a case of third time lucky for Collins as he finally got his hands on a winner medal after a 1–20 to 0–12 win.

Kerry and Collins had a dream start to life in Division 1B of the 2016 National Hurling League as they overcame Laois in the opening round. Before running Limerick to just four points. Heavy losses to both Wexford and Clare looked to derail the season before a historic first victory over Offaly in 60 years at Birr on the final day. Despite this they still found themselves in the Division 1B relegation play-off where they again faced Laois. Collins and co powered to a second win of the season over their Leinster counterparts at Austin Stack Park on a 2–27 to 1–19 scoreline. Kerry entered Leinster Senior Hurling Championship Qualifier Group along with Carlow, Westmeath and Offaly. It was a somewhat disappointing campaign for Collins and co as despite an opening round win over Carlow they would lose out to both Westmeath and Offaly to finish third in the group.

The 2017 National Hurling League wouldn't go as well as 2016. Despite an opining round win over Laois, where Collins scored two points, that was as good as it got for The Kingdom. Heavey losees to Limerick, Wexford and Galway followed. It set up a final day show down with Offaly. It was the Leinster side who got the win to book a Quarter-final spot and put Collins and co into the relegation play-off. For the second year in a row they would face Laois. It turned out to be an absolute thriller as the sides went to extra time. In the end it was the Leinster side who won out on a 4–20 to 1–30 scoreline. Come championship Kerry again played in the Leinster Championship however Collins missed out on all three of the side's games.

For the 2018 National Hurling League Kerry found themselves back in Division 2A. Losses to main rivals Westmeath and Carlow meant Collins and co missed out on a league final spot. Come championship Kerry took place in the inaugural staging of the Joe McDonagh Cup. As in the league losses to Westmeath and Carlow meant Collins and co again missed out on a final spot.

Collins missed the opening rounds of the 2019 National Hurling League. He returned to help his side to the final where they faced Westmeath. The result didn't go Kerry's was losing out on a 0–12 to 0–10 scoreline. Despite a good league campaign the Joe McDonagh Cup wasn't as good. Collins and co needed a last round win over Offaly to avoid relegation.

Collins missed out on the 2020 National Hurling League due to injury. The Impact of the COVID-19 pandemic on Gaelic games however seen the Joe McDonagh Cup being played later in the season and as a result Collins was able to get back to fitness. Wins over Meath, Westmeath and Carlow seen the Kingdom qualify for a first McDonagh Cup final. In the final they faced Antrim in Croke Park as a curtain-raiser for the 2020 All-Ireland Senior Hurling Championship Final. Despite two points from Collins the title went to Antrim on a 0–22 to 1–17 scoreline. Collins ended the year by winning a Joe McDonagh Cup Team of the Year award.

The 2021 National Hurling League seen Collins and co lose our to main rivals Offaly and Carlow and missed out in a final spot. The 2021 Joe McDonagh Cup see Kerry in a group with Down and Meath. An opening round win over Down looked to put the Kerrymen on track, however a surprise loss to Meath looked to derail the season. However, in a strange twist of fate Kerry had a better scoring difference and qualified for the final for the second season in a row. In the final Kerry faced Westmeath. Is wasn't to be as Collins was on the losing side once again on a 2–28 to 1–24 scoreline.

Kerry qualified for the semi-final of the 2022 National Hurling League where they lost out to Westmeath, with Collins playing a role throughout. The 2022 Joe McDonagh Cup seen Kerry in a group along with Antrim, Down, Carlow, Offaly and Meath. Wins over Carlow, Antrim and Meath seen Kerry qualify for a third final in a row. For the second time in three seasons it was a Kerry v Antrim final. Despite three points from Collins Kerry lost a thriller on a 5–22 to 4–24 scoreline. Collins missed out on Kerry's Preliminary Quarter-Final loss to Wexford.

== Honours ==
=== Team ===
Kilmoyley

- Kerry Senior Hurling Championship (4): 2015, 2016, 2020, 2021
- Munster Intermediate Club Hurling Championship (1): 2021

Ardfert

- Kerry Intermediate Football Championship (1): 2014
- Munster Intermediate Club Football Championship (1): 2014
- All-Ireland Intermediate Club Football Championship (1): 2015

St Brendan's District

- Kerry Minor Football Championship (1): 2012

Kerry

- Christy Ring Cup (1): 2015
- National League (Division 2A) (2): 2014, 2015
- All-Ireland Under 21 B Hurling Championship (1): 2013
- All-Ireland Minor B Hurling Championship (1): 2012
  - GAA/GPA 2020 Joe McDonagh Cup Team of the Year (1): 2020

Sporting positions
Preceded by John Griffin	Kerry Senior Hurling Captain; 2016	Succeeded by Aiden McCabe
