= Jack Goulding =

Irish hurler

Personal information
- Native name: Seán Ó Gabhláin (Irish)
- Born: 1997 (age 28–29) Ballyduff, County Kerry, Ireland
- Occupation: Physiotherapist

Sport
- Sport: Hurling
- Position: Right corner-forward
Clubs
- Years: Club
- 2014-2019 2020-2023 2020-2023 2024-: Ballyduff; Fulham Irish; St Gabriel's; Ballyduff
Club titles
	Football	Hurling
London titles	2	1
College
- Years: College
- University of Limerick
College titles
- Sigerson titles: 0
- Fitzgibbon titles: 1
Inter-county*
Years	County	Apps (scores)
2016-2019 2022-present	Kerry; London	6 (0-06)
Inter-county titles
- Leinster titles: 0
- All-Irelands: 0
- NHL: 0
- All Stars: 0
- *Inter County team apps and scores correct as of 22:37, 11 March 2018.

Jack Goulding (born 1997) is an Irish hurler. At club level he plays hurling with St Gabriel's and Gaelic football with Fulham Irish, having earlier played with Ballyduff, while he has also played at senior inter-county level with Kerry and London.

== Career ==
Goulding first played hurling to a high standard as a student at Causeway Comprehensive school. He scored a vital goal when the school's under-16 team beat Roscrea Vocational School to claim the Munster Vocational JAHC title in 2012. Goulding later lined out with University of Limerick and was a substitute for their Fitzgibbon Cup success in 2018.

After progressing through the juvenile and underage ranks with the Ballyduff club, Goulding made his senior team debut in 2014. He won a Kerry SHC medal after a 4–13 to 1–19 defeat of Lixnaw in the 2017 final replay. Goulding continued his club career after moving to London in 2020. With the Fulham Irish club he has won London SFC medals in 2020 and 2023. Goulding also won a London SHC medal with St Gabriel's in 2022.

Goulding first appeared on the inter-county scene for Kerry as a dual player at minor level. He won back-to-back All-Ireland MBHC medals in 2014 and 2015, while he was also a member of the extended minor football panel that beat Tipperary by 4–14 to 0–06 to win the All-Ireland MFC title in 2015. Goulding ended his underage inter-county tenure by winning an All-Ireland U21BHC medal in 2017, before becoming ineligible for the grade in 2018.

Goulding made his senior team debut in 2016. He later declared for London and made his first appearances for them in the 2022 National Hurling League.

== Career statistics ==
As of match played 18 May 2024

Team	Year	National League			Ring Cup		McDonagh Cup		Leinster		All-Ireland		Total	
Team	Year	Division	Apps	Score	Apps	Score	Apps	Score	Apps	Score	Apps	Score	Apps	Score
Kerry	2016	Division 1B	5	0-06	—		—		3	0-04	—		8	0-10
Kerry	2017	Division 1B	6	0-03	—		—		3	0-02	—		9	0-05
Kerry	2018	Division 2A	5	2-06	—		5	2-09	—		—		10	4-15
Kerry	2019	Division 2A	5	3-10	—		4	0-02	—		—		9	3-12
Kerry	Total		21	5-25	—		9	2-11	6	0-06	—		36	7-42
London	2020	Division 2B	4	0-02	—		—		—		—		4	0-02
London	2021	Division 2B	—		—		—		—		—		—	
London	2022	Division 2B	5	0-11	4	2-13	—		—		—		9	2-24
London	2023	Division 2B	4	5-14	5	0-13	—		—		—		9	5-27
London	2024	Division 2B	4	4-35	5	5-50	—		—		—		9	9-85
London	Total		17	9-62	14	7-76	—		—		—		31	16-138
Career total			38	14-87	14	7-76	9	2-11	6	0-06	—		67	23-180

== Honours ==
University of Limerick

- Fitzgibbon Cup: 2018

Ballyduff

- Kerry Senior Hurling Championship: 2017

St Gabriel's

- London Senior Hurling Championship: 2022

Fulham Irish

- London Senior Football Championship: 2020, 2023

Kerry

- All-Ireland Under-21 B Hurling Championship: 2017
- All-Ireland Minor Football Championship: 2015
- Munster Minor Football Championship: 2015
- All-Ireland Minor B Hurling Championship: 2014, 2015

Sporting positions
Preceded by	London senior hurling team captain 2023	Succeeded by Stephen Frawley; Kevin Reid
