= 2016 Kerry Senior Hurling Championship =

Annual hurling competition season

- Dates: 25 June – 24 September 2016
- Teams: 8
- Sponsor: Garvey's SuperValu
- Champions: Kilmoyley (24th title); Aiden McCabe (captain); Fergie O'Loughlin (manager)
- Runners-up: Ballyduff; Pádraig O'Grady (captain); Bobby Thornhill (manager)

Tournament statistics
- Matches played: 15
- Goals scored: 39 (2.6 per match)
- Points scored: 445 (29.67 per match)
- Top scorer(s): Pádraig Boyle (5-31)

The 2016 Kerry Senior Hurling Championship was the 115th staging of the Kerry Senior Hurling Championship since its establishment by the Kerry County Board in 1889. The competition ran from 25 June to 24 September 2016.

Kilmoyley were the defending champions.

The final, a replay, was played on 24 September 2016 at Austin Stack Park in Tralee, between Kilmoyley and Ballyduff, in what was their first meeting in the final in 28 years. Kilmoyley won the match by 1–18 to 2–13 to claim a record-equalling 24th championship title overall and a second title in succession.

Ballyduff's Pádraig Boyle was the championship's top scorer with 5-31.

== Results ==
=== Round 1 ===
25 June 2016 Round 1	Crotta O'Neill's	0-22 - 2-16 (aet)	Abbeydorney	Ballyduff Grounds
	S Nolan 0-16, J Conway 0-2, I McCarthy 0-2, S Weir 0-1, M Lynch 0-1.		C Dower 0-9, M O'Leary 1-5, Brendan O'Leary 1-0, D O'Brien 0-1, D Egan 0-1.

26 June 2016 Round 1	Causeway	2-08 - 0-12	Lixnaw	Lerrig Grounds
	K Carmody 1-3, A Whyte 1-1, P McGrath 0-2, B Murphy 0-1, S Murphy 0-1.		M Conway 0-6, S Conway 0-2, R Heffernan 0-2, B Brosnan 0-1, C Sheehy 0-1.

26 June 2016 Round 1	Kilmoyley	2-18 - 0-18	Ballyduff	Healy Park
	D Collins 0-6, A Royle 1-1, A McCabe 1-0, S Maunsell 0-3, J Brick 0-3, T Murnane 0-2, M O'Connor 0-1, P O'Connor 0-1, J Godley 0-1.		M Boyle 0-10, G O'Brien 0-3, P O'Carroll 0-2, J Goulding 0-2, A O'Carroll 0-1.

26 June 2016 Round 1	St Brendan's	5-20 - 0-07	Ballyheigue	Healy Park
	N O'Sullivan 4-0, J Egan 0-10, K Skinner 1-4, C Hussey 0-2, D Dineen 0-1, S Leen 0-1, D Griffin 0-1, T Hanafin 0-1.		P Lucid 0-3, R Kenny 0-1, T Casey 0-1, M Dineen 0-1, D Walsh 0-1.

3 July 2016 Round 1 replay	Crotta O'Neill's	0-10 - 3-13	Abbeydorney	Austin Stack Park
	S Nolan 0-8, J Conway 0-1, C Browne 0-1.		J O'Connor 2-0, PJ Keane 1-2, C Dower 0-4, M O'Leary 0-4, S O'Sullivan 0-1, Brian O'Leary 0-1, Brendan O'Leary 0-1.

=== Round 2A ===
9 July 2016 Round 2A	Causeway	1-16 - 3-19	St Brendan's	Healy Park
	P McGrath 0-8, K Carmody 1-2, J Leahy 0-2, T Casey 0-1, M Murphy 0-1, Alan Whyte 0-1, Adam Whyte 0-1.		C Hussey 2-4, J Egan 0-8, K Skinner 1-1, D Dineen 0-2, D Wallace 0-2, T Hannafin 0-1, E Leen 0-1.

10 July 2016 Round 2A	Abbeydorney	0-20 - 0-16	Kilmoyley	Austin Stack Park
	M O'Leary 0-8, J O'Connor 0-3, PJ Keane 0-2, K Dineen 0-2, A Healy 0-1, D Egan 0-1, R Donovan 0-1, E Egan 0-1, M Hannafin 0-1.		T Murnane 0-6, P O'Connor 0-2, D Collins 0-2, S Maunsell 0-2, J Godley 0-2, J McElligott 0-1, M O'Connor 0-1.

=== Round 2B ===
9 July 2016 Round 2B	Ballyheigue	0-14 - 2-13	Ballyduff	Lerrig Grounds
	P Lucid 0-10, A Flahive 0-2, D Walsh 0-1, T Casey 0-1.		M Boyle 0-5, J Hussey 1-1, G O'Brien 1-0, J Goulding 0-3, L Boyle 0-1, A O'Carroll 0-1, E Ross 0-1.

10 July 2016 Round 2B	Lixnaw	4-08 - 1-08	Crotta O'Neill's	Austin Stack Park
	J Griffin 1-2, R Heffernan 1-1, S Conway 1-0, R Galvin 1-0, M Conway 0-3, J Wallace 0-2.		S Nolan 0-7, T Quinlan 1-0, J Conway 0-1.

=== Quarter-finals ===
24 July 2016 Quarter-final	Kilmoyley	1-19 - 1-16	Lixnaw	Austin Stack Park
	D Collins 1-4, J Brick 0-4, D Fitzell 0-2, P O'Connor 0-2, M O'Connor 0-2, S Maunsell 0-2, T Murnane 0-1, S Dowling 0-1, J McElligott 0-1.		M Conway 1-7, B Brosnan 0-4, J Flaherty 0-2, E Galvin 0-1, J Griffin 0-1, S Conway 0-1.

24 July 2016 Quarter-final	Ballyduff	5-16 - 1-15	Causeway	Austin Stack Park
	P Boyle 1-9, J Goulding 2-1, L Boyle 1-2, J Hussey 1-0, G O'Brien 0-2, E O'Connor 0-1, D O'Carroll 0-1.		K Carmody 0-4, P McGrath 0-4, M Murphy 1-0, B Barrett 0-3, S Murphy 0-2, J Leahy 0-1, B Murphy 0-1.

=== Semi-finals ===
14 August 2016 Semi-final	KIlmoyley	1-13 - 0-15	St Brendan's	Austin Stack Park
	D Collins 1-4, S Maunsell 0-2, J Brick 0-1, M O'Connor 0-1, J McElligott 0-1, A Royle 0-1, P O'Connor 0-1, A McCabe 0-1, S Nolan 0-1.		J Egan 0-9, K Skinner 0-3, D Wallace 0-1, F Mackessey 0-1, D Griffin 0-1.

14 August 2016 Semi-final	Ballyduff	1-20 - 0-11	Abbeydorney	Austin Stack Park
	P Boyle 1-9, J Goulding 0-8, E Ross 0-1, B O'Grady 0-1, S Browne 0-1.		M O'Leary 0-3, Brian O'Leary 0-2, J O'Connor 0-2, Brendan O'Leary 0-2, N Roche 0-2.

=== Final ===
11 September 2016 Final	Kilmoyley	1-17 - 2-14	Ballyduff	Austin Stack Park
	D Collins 0-11, J Godley 1-0, S Brick 0-2, P O'Connor 0-2, A Royle 0-1, S Maunsell 0-1.		P Boyle 1-6, J Goulding 0-4, L Boyle 1-0, M Boyle 0-3, B O'Brady 0-1.

=== Final replay ===
24 September 2016 Final replay	Kilmoyley	1-18 - 2-13	Ballyduff	Austin Stack Park
	D Collins 0-8, L Fitzell 1-0, S Brick 0-3, M O'Connor 0-2, R Collins 0-1, A Royle 0-1, S Maunsell 0-1, T Murnane 0-1, P O'Connor 0-1.		P Boyle 2-7, M Boyle 0-3, J Goulding 0-2, L Boyle 0-1.	Referee: D Copps (Cork)

== Championship statistics ==
=== Top scorers ===
Overall

Rank	Player	County	Tally	Total	Matches	Average
1	Pádraig Boyle	Ballyduff	5-31	46	4	11.50
2	Daniel Collins	Kilmoyley	2-35	41	6	6.83
3	Shane Nolan	Crotta O'Neill's	0-31	31	3	10.33
4	John Egan	St Brendan's	0-27	27	3	9.00
5	Jack Goulding	Ballyduff	2-19	25	6	4.16
6	Michael O'Leary	Abbeydorney	1-20	23	4	5.75
7	Mikey Boyle	Ballyduff	0-21	21	6	3.50
8	Mike Conway	Lixnaw	1-16	19	3	6.33
9	Keith Carmody	Causeway	2-09	15	3	5.00
10	Kevin Skinner	St Brendan's	2-08	14	3	4.66
10	Paul McGrath	Causeway	0-14	14	3	4.66

Single game

Rank	Player	Club	Tally	Total	Opposition
1	Shane Nolan	Crotta O'Neill's	0-16	16	Abbeydorney
2	Pádraig Boyle	Ballyduff	2-07	13	Kilmoyley
3	Nicky O'Sullivan	St Brendan's	4-00	12	Ballyheigue
4	Pádraig Boyle	Ballyduff	1-09	12	Causeway
5	Pádraig Boyle	Ballyduff	1-09	12	Abbeydorney
6	Daniel Collins	Kilmoyley	0-11	11	Ballyduff
7	Cian Hussey	St Brendan's	2-04	10	Causeway
7	Mike Conway	Lixnaw	1-07	10	Kilmoyley
7	Mikey Boyle	Ballyduff	0-10	10	Kilmoyley
7	Philip Lucid	Ballyheigue	0-10	10	Ballyduff
7	John Egan	St Brendan's	0-10	10	Ballyheigue
