= Aiden McCabe =

Irish hurler (born 1987)

Personal information
- Native name: Aodán Mac Cába (Irish)
- Born: 27/09/1987 Kilmoyley, County Kerry, Ireland
- Occupation: Plumber

Sport
- Sport: Hurling
- Position: Goalkeeper
Club
- Years: Club
- Kilmoyley
Club titles
- Kerry titles: 1
Inter-county*
Years	County	Apps (scores)
2016-	Kerry	3 (0-00)
Inter-county titles
- Leinster titles: 0
- All-Irelands: 0
- NHL: 0
- All Stars: 1 Kerry hurling allstar
- *Inter County team apps and scores correct as of 14:59, 8 May 2016.

Aiden McCabe (born 27 September 1987) is an Irish hurler who plays as a goalkeeper for the Kerry senior team.

Born in Kilmoyley, County Kerry, McCabe was introduced to hurling in his youth. He developed his skills at Causeway Comprehensive while simultaneously enjoying championship successes at underage levels with the Kilmoyley club. He has won one championship medal with the Kilmoyley senior team.

McCabe made his senior debut during the 2016 Munster League. He has subsequently become a regular member of the starting fifteen.

== Career statistics ==
As of match played 22 May 2016.

Team	Year	Division	Munster League		National League		Leinster		All-Ireland		Total	
Team	Year	Division	Apps	Score	Apps	Score	Apps	Score	Apps	Score	Apps	Score
Kerry	2016	Division 1B	2	0-00	2	0-00	3	0-00	0	0-00	7	0-00
Total			2	0-00	2	0-00	3	0-00	0	0-00	7	0-00

Sporting positions
Preceded by Daniel Collins	Kerry Senior Hurling Captain; 2017	Succeeded by Pádraig Boyle
