= 2020 Kerry Senior Hurling Championship =

Annual hurling competition season

- Dates: 14 August – 20 September 2020
- Teams: 8
- Sponsor: Garvey's SuperValu
- Champions: Kilmoyley (25th title); John B. O'Halloran (captain); John Meyler (manager)
- Runners-up: Causeway; Bryan Murphy (captain); Stephen Goggin (manager)

Tournament statistics
- Matches played: 7
- Goals scored: 8 (1.14 per match)
- Points scored: 214 (30.57 per match)
- Top scorer(s): Maurice O'Connor (3-15)

The 2020 Kerry Senior Hurling Championship was the 119th staging of the Kerry Senior Hurling Championship since its establishment by the Kerry County Board in 1889. The championship draw took place on 29 June 2020. A straight knockout format was used for the first time in a number of years due to the impact of the COVID-19 pandemic on Gaelic games. The championship ran from 14 August to 20 September 2020.

Causeway entered the championship as the defending champions.

The final was played on 20 September 2020 at Austin Stack Park in Tralee, between Kilmoyley and Causeway, in what was their third meeting in the final overall and a first final meeting in 13 years. Kilmoyley won the match by 2–12 to 1–14 to claim a record-equalling 25th championship title overall and a first title in four years.

Kilmoyley's Maurice O'Connor was the championship's top scorer with 3-15.

== Results ==
=== Quarter-finals ===
14 August 2020 Quarter-final	Ballyheigue	0-15 - 1-20	Ballyduff	Austin Stack Park
	N Guerin (0-8, 7 frees), M Leane (0-5), C Casey and C Walsh (0-1 each).	Report	P Boyle (0-12, 0-6 frees), D Moriarty (1-3), K O’Connor and K Goulding (0-2 each), E Ross (0-1).

15 August 2020 Quarter-final	St Brendan's	0-12 - 0-15	Kilmoyley	Austin Stack Park
	K Hannafin 0-5, C Hussey 0-5, N O'Driscoll 0-1, T Moloney 0-1.	Report	M O'Connor 0-9, D Collins 0-2, T Murnane 0-1, P O'Connor 0-1, J Brick 0-1, R Collins 0-1.

16 August 2020 Quarter-final	Lixnaw	0-19 - 1-18	Abbeydorney	Austin Stack Park
	S Conway 0-9, J Galvin 0-3, J Buckley 0-3, B Brosnan 0-1, M Kelliher 0-1, J Flaherty 0-1, J McKenna 0-1.	Report	PJ Keane 0-8, J Sheehan 1-2, B O'Leary 0-2, M O'Leary 0-2, D O'Leary 0-2, R ODonovan 0-1, T Ó hAiniféin 0-1.

16 August 2020 Quarter-final	Causeway	0-14 - 0-13	Crotta O'Neill's	Austin Stack Park
	B Lyons 0-6, Joseph Diggins 0-2, T Casey 0-2, D Goggin 0-2, C Harty 0-1, Jason Diggins 0-1.		S Nolan 0-8, D Kennelly 0-2, J Sheehan 0-1, S O'Donoghue 0-1, C Trant 0-1.

=== Semi-finals ===
6 September 2020 Semi-final	Kilmoyley	1-20 - 1-12	Abbeydorney	Austin Stack Park
	D Collins (0-10, 7 frees), M O’Connor (1-4), S Maunsell and P O’Connor (0-2 each), J Brick and K McCarthy (0-1 each).	Report	PJ Keane ( 0-5 frees), M Slattery ( 1-1), D O’Leary ( 0-3) M O’Leary, D Egan and T Ó hAiniféin 0-1 each.

6 September 2020 Semi-final	Causeway	1-19 - 0-11	Ballyduff	Austin Stack Park
	B Lyons (0-9, 5 frees), G Dooley (1-0), T Casey and C Harty (0-3 each), B Murphy (0-2), T Flynn (1 free) and D Goggin (0-1 each).	Report	P Boyle (3 frees), D Moriarty (2 frees) and M Boyle (0-3 each), E Ross and K Goulding (0-1 each).

=== Final ===
20 September 2020 Final	Kilmoyley	2-12 - 1-14	Causeway	Austin Stack Park
	M O’Connor (2-2), D Collins (0-8, frees, 2 ‘65’s), M Flaherty and P O’Connor (0-1 each).	Report	B Barrett (1-3, 1-2 frees), S Leahy (0-3), B Lyons (1 free, 1’65), C Harty and D Goggin (0-2 each), Joe Diggins and K Carmody (0-1 each).	Referee: D O'Callaghan (Limerick)

== Championship statistics ==
=== Top scorers ===
Overall

Rank	Player	County	Tally	Total	Matches	Average
1	Maurice O'Connor	Kilmoyley	3-15	24	3	8.00
2	Daniel Collins	Kilmoyley	0-20	20	3	6.66
3	Billy Lyons	Causeway	0-17	17	3	5.66
4	Pádraig Boyle	Ballyduff	0-15	15	2	7.50
5	P. J. Keane	Abbeydorney	0-13	13	2	6.50

Single game

Rank	Player	Club	Tally	Total	Opposition
1	Pádraig Boyle	Ballyduff	0-12	12	Ballyheigue
2	Daniel Collins	Kilmoyley	0-10	10	Abbeydorney
3	Billy Lyons	Causeway	0-09	9	Ballyduff
3	Maurice O'Connor	Kilmoyley	0-09	9	St Brendan's
3	Shane Conway	Lixnaw	0-09	9	Abbeydorney
6	Maurice O'Connor	Kilmoyley	2-02	8	Causeway
6	Daniel Collins	Kilmoyley	0-08	8	Causeway
6	Nathan Guerin	Ballyheigue	0-08	8	Ballyduff
6	P. J. Keane	Abbeydorney	0-08	8	Lixnaw
6	Shane Nolan	Crotta O'Neill's	0-08	8	Causeway
