= 2021 Kerry Senior Hurling Championship =

Annual hurling competition season

- Dates: 30 July – 19 September 2021
- Teams: 9
- Sponsor: Garvey's SuperValu
- Champions: Kilmoyley (26th title); Flor McCarthy (captain); John Meyler (manager)
- Runners-up: St Brendan's; Stephen Leen (captain); Tomás Moloney (manager)

Tournament statistics
- Matches played: 14
- Goals scored: 31 (2.21 per match)
- Points scored: 431 (30.79 per match)
- Top scorer(s): Cian Hussey (1-48)

The 2021 Kerry Senior Hurling Championship was the 120th staging of the Kerry Senior Hurling Championship since its establishment by the Kerry County Board in 1889. The draw for the group stage pairings took place on 15 July 2021. The championship ran from 30 July to 19 September 2021.

Kilmoyley entered the championship as the defending champions.

The final was played on 19 September 2021 at Austin Stack Park in Tralee, between Kilmoyley and St Brendan's, in what was their fifth meeting in the final overall and a first final meeting in six years. Kilmoyley won the match by 1–14 to 1–11 to claim a record-breaking 26th championship title overall and a second title in succession.

Cian Hussey was the championship's top scorer with 1-48.

== Team changes ==
=== To championship ===
Promoted from the Kerry Intermediate Hurling Championship

- Dr Crokes

== Group 1 ==
=== Group 1 table ===
Advance to knockout stage

Team	Matches				Score			Pts
Team	Pld	W	D	L	For	Against	Diff	Pts
Causeway	2	2	0	0	48	29	19	4
St Brendan's	2	1	0	1	36	50	-14	2
Ballyduff	2	0	0	2	37	42	-5	0

=== Group 1 results ===
31 July 2021 Round 1	Causeway	3-20 - 0-13	St Brendan's	Austin Stack Park
	B Lyons 0-8, G Dooley 2-1, K Carmody 0-4, S Leahy 1-0, C Harty 0-3, G Leen 0-1, G Carey 0-1, A Feely 0-1, J Diggins 0-1.		C Hussey 0-8, B O'Connor 0-2, F Mackessy 0-2, P O'Sullivan 0-1.

8 August 2021 Round 2	Ballyduff	1-13 - 1-16	Causeway	Austin Stack Park
	P Boyle 0-9, A Boyle 1-1, M Boyle 0-1, D Moriarty 0-1, K Goulding 0-1.		B Lyons 0-9, B Murphy 1-1, J Leahy 0-2, S Leahy 0-1, J Diggins 0-1, T Casey 0-1, G Dooley 0-1.

13 August 2021 Round 3	St Brendan's	2-17 - 1-18	Ballyduff	Austin Stack Park
	C Hussey 0-14 (0-7 frees, 0-1 ’65), F Mackessy 1-2, S Brosnan 1-1.	Report	P Boyle 0-14 (0-12 frees), A Boyle 1-0, K Goulding 0-2; M Boyle 0-1, K O’Connor 0-1.

== Group 2 ==
=== Group 2 table ===
Advance to knockout stage

Team	Matches				Score			Pts
Team	Pld	W	D	L	For	Against	Diff	Pts
Kilmoyley	2	2	0	0	61	36	25	4
Lixnaw	2	1	0	1	32	37	-5	2
Ballyheigue	2	0	0	2	30	50	-20	0

=== Group 2 results ===
30 July 2021 Round 1	Kilmoyley	4-23 - 1-16	Ballyheigue	Austin Stack Park
	D Collins 1-11, M O'Connor 2-1, R Collins 1-2, J Brick 0-3, R Walsh 0-2, T Murnane 0-2, M Flaherty 0-1, P O'Connor 0-1.		N Guerin 0-8, P Carroll 1-0, C Walsh 0-3, M Leane 0-2, D Mahony 0-2, B O'Riordan 0-1.

7 August 2021 Round 2	Ballyheigue	1-08 - 1-12	Lixnaw	Austin Stack Park
	N Guerin 1-7, P Carroll 0-1.		S Conway 0-9, J Buckley 1-2, R Galvin 0-1.

15 August 2021 Round 3	Lixnaw	1-14 - 1-23	Kilmoyley	Austin Stack Park
	S Conway (0-7, 5f), J Buckley (1-0), M Kelliher (0-2), J Brosnan (0-1), B Brosnan (0-1), C O'Keeffe (0-1), E McCarthy 0-1.	Report	D Collins (0-9, 8f), D Nolan 1-1, J Brick (0-3), D McCarthy (0-2), A Royle 0-2, D Kennedy (0-1), F McCarthy (0-1), D Fitzell (0-1), M Flaherty (0-1), R Collins (0-1), R Walsh (0-1).

== Group 3 ==
=== Group 3 table ===
Advance to knockout stage

Team	Matches				Score			Pts
Team	Pld	W	D	L	For	Against	Diff	Pts
Crotta O'Neill's	2	1	1	0	46	21	25	3
Abbeydorney	2	1	1	0	32	31	1	3
Dr Crokes	2	0	0	2	24	50	-26	0

=== Group 3 results ===
1 August 2021 Round 1	Abbeydorney	0-18 - 0-17	Dr Crokes	Austin Stack Park
	K O'Connor 0-7, D Scanlon 0-3, B O'Leary 0-2, A Maunsell 0-1, J O'Connor 0-1, R O'Donovan 0-1, S O'Donovan 0-1, D O'Leary 0-1, D Egan 0-1.		M Heffernan 0-11, D Carroll 0-2, J Lenihan 0-1, T Doyle 0-1, A Murphy 0-1, C Bohane 0-1.

6 August 2021 Round 2	Dr Crokes	1-04 - 3-23	Crotta O'Neill's	Austin Stack Park
	A Murphy 1-0, M Heffernan 0-3, T Doyle 0-1.		Declan O'Donoghue 2-2, S Nolan 0-6, D Hunt 1-1, B Mahony 0-4, Darragh O'Donoghue 0-2, J Sheehan 0-2, D Quille 0-1, D Kennelly 0-1, P Quille 0-1, A O'Mahony 0-1, T O'Connor 0-1, R Nolan 0-1.

14 August 2-21 Round 3	Crotta O'Neill's	0-14 - 1-11	Abbeydorney	Austin Stack Park
	S Nolan ((0-7, 6f), B Mahony (0-2), Declan O'Donoghue (0-2), J Sheehan (0-1).	Report	K O'Connor (0-8, 6f, 2'65), M Slattery (1-0), J Sheehan (0-2), J Parker 0-1.

== Knockout stage ==
=== Quarter-finals ===
21 August 2021 Quarter-final	Lixnaw	2-18 - 1-09	Abbeydorney	Austin Stack Park
	S Conway (0-7, 7f), J Buckley (0-4), S McElligott 1-0, J Brosnan (1-0), M Conway (0-3), B Brosnan (0-1), C O'Keeffe (0-1), M Kelliher (0-1), J Flaherty 0-1.	Report	K O'Connor (0-4, 2f, 1'65), J Sheehan (1-0), D Egan (0-2), J O'Connor (0-1), R O'Donovan (0-1), PJ Keane 0-1.

21 August 2021 Quarter-final	St Brendan's	1-16 - 0-18	Crotta O'Neill's	Austin Stack Park
	C Hussey 1-13, F Mackessy 0-2, S O'Halloran 0-1.	Report	S Nolan 0-10, C Trant 0-2, D Hunt 0-2, B O'Mahony 0-2, Declan O'Donoghue 0-1, J Sheehan 0-1.

=== Semi-finals ===
4 September 2021 Semi-final	Kilmoyley	0-17 - 0-16	Lixnaw	Austin Stack Park
	D Collins (0-12, 9 frees), P O’Connor, M O’Connor, J Brick, R Walsh, D Nolan (0-1 each).	Report	S Conway (0-12, 10 frees, 1 S/L), B Brosnan (0-2), W Costello, S McElligott (0-1 each).

5 September 2021 Semi-final	St Brendan's	1-19 - 2-13	Causeway	Austin Stack Park
	C Hussey (0-8, 7 frees, 1 65), F Mackessy (1-5), S Brosnan (0-2), E Leen, B O’Connor, J Egan, K Hannafin (0-1 each).	Report	B Murphy (0-5, 4 frees), B Lyons, G Dooley (1-1 each), J Diggins (2 frees), C Harty, D Goggin (0-2 each).

=== Final ===
19 September 2021 Final	Kilmoyley	1-14 - 1-11	St Brendan's	Austin Stack Park
	D Collins (0-6, 5 f’s), M O’Connor (1-1), P O’Connor, D Nolan and A Royle (0-2 each), J Brick (0-1).	Report	C Hussey (0-5, 3f), K Hanafin (1-0), F Mackessy and S Brosnan (0-2 each), P O’Sullivan and S O’Halloran (0-1 each).	Referee: M Sexton (Limerick)

== Championship statistics ==
=== Top scorers ===
Overall

Rank	Player	County	Tally	Total	Matches	Average
1	Cian Hussey	St Brendan's	1-48	51	5	10.20
2	Daniel Collins	Kilmoyley	1-38	41	4	10.25
3	Shane Conway	Lixnaw	0-35	35	4	8.75
4	Pádraig Boyle	Ballyduff	0-23	23	2	11.50
4	Shane Nolan	Crotta O'Neill's	0-23	23	3	7.66
6	Billy Lyons	Causeway	1-18	21	3	7.00
7	Fionán Mackessy	St Brendan's	2-13	19	5	3.80
7	Keith O'Connor	Abbeydorney	0-19	19	3	6.33
9	Nathan Guerin	Ballyheigue	1-15	18	2	9.00
10	Mark Heffernan	Dr Crokes	0-14	14	2	7.00

Single game

Rank	Player	Club	Tally	Total	Opposition
1	Cian Hussey	St Brendan's	1-13	16	Crotta O'Neill's
2	Daniel Collins	Kilmoyley	1-11	14	Ballyheigue
2	Pádraig Boyle	Ballyduff	0-14	14	St Brendan's
2	Cian Hussey	St Brendan's	0-14	14	Ballyduff
5	Daniel Collins	Kilmoyley	0-12	12	Lixnaw
5	Shane Conway	Lixnaw	0-12	12	Kilmoyley
7	Mark Heffernan	Dr Crokes	0-11	11	Abbeydorney
8	Nathan Guerin	Ballyheigue	1-07	10	Lixnaw
8	Shane Nolan	Crotta O'Neill's	0-10	10	St Brendan's
10	Shane Conway	Lixnaw	0-09	9	Ballyheigue
10	Pádraig Boyle	Ballyduff	0-09	9	Causeway
10	Daniel Collins	Kilmoyley	0-09	9	Lixnaw
10	Billy Lyons	Causeway	0-09	9	Ballyduff

=== Miscellaneous ===
- Dr Crokes make their first appearance at senior level.
