= 2020 Canon O'Brien Cup =

- Dates: 7 January 2020
- Teams: 2
- Champions: University College Cork (2nd title); Eoghan Murphy (captain)
- Runners-up: Cork

Tournament statistics
- Matches played: 1
- Goals scored: 3 (3 per match)
- Points scored: 38 (38 per match)
- Top scorer(s): Shane Conway (0-05)

The 2020 Canon O'Brien Cup was a hurling game played to determine the champion of the Canon O'Brien Cup for the 2020 season. University College Cork defeated the Cork senior hurling team by 2-18 to 1-20. The game was played on 7 January 2020 in the Mardyke, Cork. This was the seventh staging of Canon O'Brien Cup since 2013.

== Match ==
=== Details ===
7 January 2020
Final

Cork	1-20 – 2-18	University College Cork
S Conway (0-5, 0-265s, 0-1 free), S Hayes (1-1), M O’Halloran (1-0), D Fitzgibbon, S Kingston (0-1 free) and W Henn (0-2 each), A Casey, B Hennessy, C Boylan, B Sheehan, J O’Sullivan and R Connolly (0-1 each).	Report	L Meade (1-1), C O’Leary (0-4, 0-1 free), B Turnbull (0-3), P Horgan, S Harnedy, J O’Connor and S Óg O’Regan (0-2 each), D Cahalane, T O’Mahony, C Lehane (free) and T O’Connell (0-1 each).

The Mardyke, Cork
Referee: Simon Stokes (Tullylease)

Cork	UCC
