= 2015 All-Ireland Minor B Hurling Championship =

- Dates: 1 August 2015 – 5 September 2015
- Teams: 8
- Champions: Kerry
- Runners-up: Roscommon

Tournament statistics
- Matches played: 7
- Goals scored: 37 (5.29 per match)
- Points scored: 180 (25.71 per match)

The 2015 All-Ireland Minor B Hurling Championship was the most recent staging of the All-Ireland hurling championship for players under the age of eighteen since its establishment by the Gaelic Athletic Association. The championship began on 1 August 2015 and ended on 5 September 2015.

Kerry were the defending champions and successfully retained the title following a 6-17 to 1-8 defeat of Roscommon.

== Results ==
=== Quarter-finals ===
1 August 2015 Quarter-final	Kildare	0-13 - 2-19	Kerry	St. Conleth's Park

1 August 2015 Quarter-final	Roscommon	4-8 - 3-9	Meath	Athleague GAA Grounds

1 August 2015 Quarter-final	Wicklow	5-13 - 1-15	Armagh	Pearse Park

1 August 2015 Quarter-final	Down	3-17 - 4-3	Donegal	Ballela

=== Semi-finals ===
15 August 2015 Semi-final	Down	3-9 - 2-22	Kerry	St. Conleth's Park
	C Coulter 0-7 (0-6 frees, 0-1 ’65), D Sands 1-1, P Loughrane and R Ward 1-0, R Beattie 0-1.	Report	J Buckley 1-7 ( 1-0 ’65, 0-1 free), S Conway 1-7 ( 1-0 pen, 0-4 frees), F Mackessy 0-3, E Leen and K O’Regan 0-2 each, T O Connor 0-1.	Referee: J Heffernan (Wexford)

15 August 2015 Semi-final	Wicklow	1-14 - 2-13	Roscommon	Pearse Park

=== Final ===
5 September 2015 Final	Kerry	6-17 - 1-8	Roscommon	Gaelic Grounds
		Report
