= Clare–Cork hurling rivalry =

Irish sporting rivalry

Cork–Clare
- Location: County Clare; County Cork
- Teams: Clare; Cork
- First meeting: Clare 2–9 – 3–4 Cork; 1899 Munster semi-final (13 May 1900)
- Latest meeting: Clare 1-14 Cork 1-30; 2026 Munster Senior Hurling Championship (24 May 2026)

Statistics
- Total meetings: 62
- Most player appearances: Christy Ring (10)
- Top scorer: Christy Ring (4–41)
- All-time series: Championship: Cork 40–17 Clare (5 draws)
- Largest victory: Cork 6–8 – 0–2 Clare; 1922 Munster quarter-final (22 April 1923)

The Cork–Clare rivalry is a hurling rivalry between Irish county teams Cork and Clare.

While both teams play provincial hurling in the Munster Senior Hurling Championship, they have also enjoyed success in the All-Ireland Senior Hurling Championship, having won 35 championship titles between them to date. They played one another for the first time at an All Ireland Final at the 2013 final on 8 September 2013. This match ended in a draw and Clare won the replay 5–16 – 3–16. Clare beat Cork again in the 2024 All Ireland final in extra time.

== Roots ==
=== History ===
While Cork are regarded as one of the "big three" of hurling, with Kilkenny and Tipperary completing the trio, Clare have generally been regarded as one of the minnows of hurling for much of their championship lives. Due to both teams playing in the Munster series, meetings between Cork and Clare have been regular since the beginning of the provincial championship in 1888.

The first great era of the rivalry came between 1927 and 1932, when Cork and Clare played each other on six occasions. While Cork had the bragging rights from the first three games, Clare defeated Cork, who were the reigning All-Ireland champions, in 1930. It was only their third ever defeat of Cork and a first in sixteen years. Cork reasserted their supremacy the following year by defeating Clare and claiming the subsequent All-Ireland crown, however, Clare dumped a depleted Cork team out of the championship in 1932.

The rivalry reached new heights in 1977 and 1978, when the Munster decider on both occasions was contested by Cork and Clare. Clare won the National Hurling League in both 1977 and 1978 and had high hopes of claiming championship honours. The era belonged to Cork, however, as their triumph in both provincial deciders led to the team securing a hat-trick of All-Ireland crowns.

One of the most intense periods in the rivalry occurred between 1993 and 1999. For the first time ever, Clare secured four successive championship victories over Cork (1993, 1995, 1997 and 1998). In 1999 Clare, as Munster champions, faced Cork in one of the defining games of the year. In a changing of the guard, a young Cork team triumphed over a Clare team who had won two All-Ireland titles and three Munster titles in the previous three years.

=== Statistics ===
Up to date as of the end of the 2024 Championship season

Team	All-Ireland	Munster	National League	Total
Cork	30	54	14	98
Clare	5	7	5	17
Combined	35	61	19	115

== All time results ==
Cork win
Clare win
Drawn game

No.	Date	Winners	Score	Runners-up	Venue	Competition
1.	13 May 1900	Clare (1)	2–9 – 3–4	Cork	Tipperary	MSHC semi-final
2.	26 April 1903	Cork (1)	3–10 – 2–6	Clare	Markets Field	MSHC final
3.	28 June 1903	Cork (2)	6–7 – 3–3	Clare	Tipperary	MSHC quarter-final
4.	20 September 1914	Clare (2)	3–2 – 3–1	Cork	Thurles Sportsfield	MSHC final
5.	26 September 1915	Cork (3)	8–2 – 2–1	Clare	Markets Field	MSHC final
6.	22 April 1923	Cork (4)	6–8 – 0–2	Clare	Markets Field	MSHC quarter-final
7.	7 August 1927	Cork (5)	5–3 – 3–4	Clare	Markets Field	MSHC final
8.	15 July 1928	Cork	2–2 – 2–2	Clare	Thurles Sportsfield	MSHC final
9.	29 July 1928	Cork (6)	6–4 – 2–2	Clare	Thurles Sportsfield	MSHC final replay
10.	6 July 1930	Clare (3)	6–6 – 5–6	Cork	Ennis Road	MSHC semi-final
11.	28 June 1931	Cork (7)	3–4 – 1–6	Clare	Thurles Sportsfield	MSHC quarter-final
12.	31 July 1932	Clare (4)	5–2 – 4–1	Cork	Thurles Sportsfield	MSHC final
13.	14 July 1935	Cork (8)	8–3 – 2–4	Clare	Gaelic Grounds	MSHC quarter-final
14.	5 July 1936	Clare	4–4 – 3–7	Cork	Gaelic Grounds	MSHC quarter-final
15.	12 July 1936	Clare (5)	9–1 – 2–3	Cork	Gaelic Grounds	MSHC quarter-final replay
16.	7 July 1940	Cork (9)	7–6 – 3–5	Clare	Gaelic Grounds	MSHC quarter-final
17.	9 June 1946	Cork (10)	2–9 – 2–1	Clare	Gaelic Grounds	MSHC quarter-final
18.	15 June 1947	Cork (11)	4–9 – 0–4	Clare	Gaelic Grounds	MSHC quarter-final
19.	1 July 1951	Cork (12)	5–7 – 3–5	Clare	Gaelic Grounds	MSHC semi-final
20.	28 June 1953	Cork (13)	2–11 – 4–2	Clare	Gaelic Grounds	MSHC semi-final
21.	5 June 1955	Clare (6)	3–8 – 2–10	Cork	Thurles Sportsfield	MSHC semi-final
22.	12 May 1957	Cork (14)	4–10 – 2–6	Clare	Thurles Sportsfield	MSHC quarter-final
23.	18 May 1958	Cork (15)	5–9 – 3–9	Clare	Thurles Sportsfield	MSHC quarter-final
24.	21 June 1959	Cork (16)	4–15 – 1–3	Clare	Thurles Sportsfield	MSHC semi-final
25.	12 June 1960	Cork (17)	2–12 – 1–11	Clare	Thurles Sportsfield	MSHC semi-final
26.	26 May 1963	Cork (18)	4–15 – 2–11	Clare	Thurles Sportsfield	MSHC quarter-final
27.	19 June 1966	Cork	3–8 – 3–8	Clare	Gaelic Grounds	MSHC quarter-final
28.	3 July 1966	Cork (19)	5–11 – 1–7	Clare	Gaelic Grounds	MSHC quarter-final replay
29.	11 May 1969	Cork	2–11 – 4–5	Clare	Thurles Sportsfield	MSHC quarter-final
30.	15 June 1969	Cork (20)	3–8 – 1–4	Clare	Thurles Sportsfield	MSHC quarter-final replay
31.	30 July 1972	Cork (21)	6–18 – 2–8	Clare	Semple Stadium	MSHC final
32.	29 June 1975	Cork (22)	3–14 – 1–9	Clare	Gaelic Grounds	MSHC semi-final
33.	10 July 1977	Cork (23)	4–15 – 4–10	Clare	Semple Stadium	MSHC final
34.	30 July 1978	Cork (24)	0–13 – 0–11	Clare	Semple Stadium	MSHC final
35.	14 June 1981	Clare (7)	2–15 2–13	Cork	Semple Stadium	MSHC semi-final
36.	20 June 1982	Cork (25)	3–19 – 2–6	Clare	Semple Stadium	MSHC semi-final
37.	20 July 1986	Cork (26)	2–18 – 3–12	Clare	Fitzgerald Stadium	MSHC final
38.	19 June 1988	Cork (27)	3–22 – 2–9	Clare	Semple Stadium	MSHC semi-final
39.	13 June 1993	Clare (8)	2–7 – 0–10	Cork	Gaelic Grounds	MSHC semi-final
40.	4 June 1995	Clare (9)	2–13 – 3–9	Cork	Gaelic Grounds	MSHC semi-final
41.	8 June 1997	Clare (10)	1–19 – 0–18	Cork	Gaelic Grounds	MSHC semi-final
42.	21 June 1998	Clare (11)	0–21 – 0–13	Cork	Semple Stadium	MSHC semi-final
43.	4 July 1999	Cork (28)	1–15 – 0–14	Clare	Semple Stadium	MSHC final
44.	9 June 2003	Cork (29)	1–18 – 0–10	Clare	Semple Stadium	MSHC semi-final
45.	14 August 2005	Cork (30)	0–16 – 0–15	Clare	Croke Park	AISHC semi-final
46.	28 May 2006	Cork (32)	0–20 – 0–14	Clare	Semple Stadium	MSHC semi-final
47.	27 May 2007	Cork (32)	1–18 – 1–11	Clare	Semple Stadium	MSHC quarter-final
48.	27 July 2008	Cork (33)	2–19 – 2–17	Clare	Semple Stadium	AISHC quarter-final
49.	23 June 2013	Cork (34)	0–23 – 0–15	Clare	Gaelic Grounds	MSHC semi-final
50.	8 September 2013	Cork	3–16 – 0–25	Clare	Croke Park	AISHC Final
51.	28 September 2013	Clare (12)	5–16 – 3–16	Cork	Croke Park	AISHC Final
52.	15 June 2014	Cork (35)	2–23 – 2–18	Clare	Semple Stadium	MSHC semi-final
53.	11 July 2015	Cork (36)	0–20 – 0–17	Clare	Semple Stadium	All Ireland Qualifiers
54.	9 July 2017	Cork (37)	1–25 – 1–20	Clare	Semple Stadium	MSHC final
55.	20 May 2018	Cork (38)	2–23 – 1–21	Clare	Páirc Uí Chaoimh	MSHC Round 1
56.	1 July 2018	Cork (39)	2–24 – 3–19	Clare	Semple Stadium	MSHC final
57.	16 July 2019	Clare (13)	2–23 – 2–18	Cork	Cusack Park	MSHC Round 5
58.	24 July 2021	Cork (40)	3–19 – 1–23	Clare	Gaelic Grounds	All-Ireland Qualifiers
59.	1 May 2022	Clare (14)	0–28 – 2–20	Cork	Semple Stadium	MSHC Round 3
60.	21 May 2023	Clare (15)	2–22 – 3–18	Cork	Cusack Park	MSHC Round 4
61.	28 April 2024	Clare (16)	3–26 – 3–24	Cork	Páirc Uí Chaoimh	MSHC Round 2
62.	21 July 2024	Clare (17)	3–29 – 1–34 (AET)	Cork	Croke Park	AISHC Final
