= 2017 All-Ireland Senior Hurling Championship =

Championship details
- Dates: 23 April — 3 September 2017
- Teams: 15

All-Ireland champions
- Winning team: Galway (5th win)
- Captain: David Burke
- Manager: Micheál Donoghue

All-Ireland Finalists
- Losing team: Waterford
- Captain: Kevin Moran
- Manager: Derek McGrath

Provincial champions
- Munster: Cork
- Leinster: Galway
- Ulster: Antrim
- Connacht: Not Played

Championship statistics
- No. matches played: 28
- Goals total: 84 (3.0 per game)
- Points total: 1122 (40.0 per game)
- Top Scorer: Pauric Mahony (0–50)
- Player of the Year: Joe Canning
- All-Star Team: See here

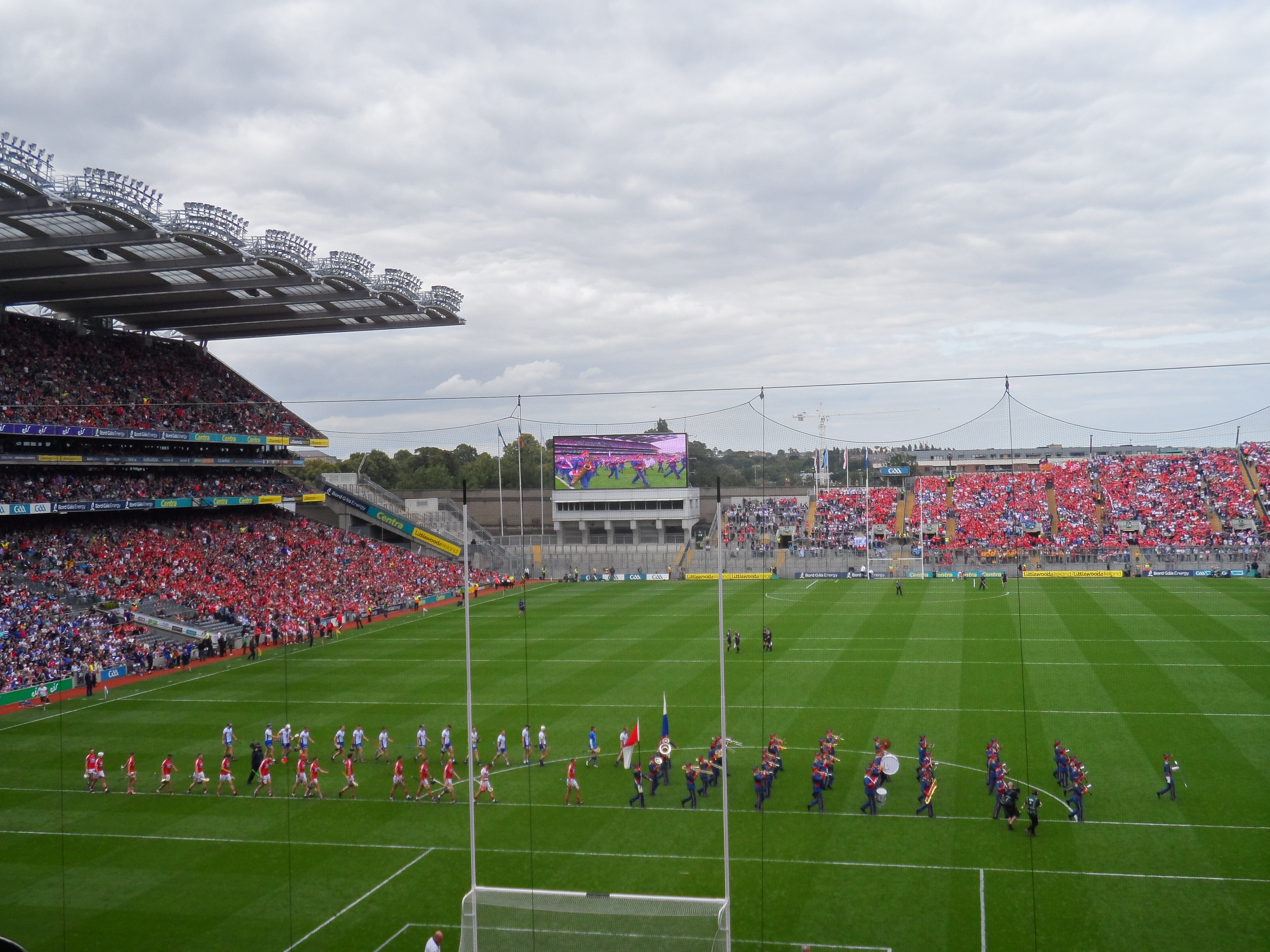
Pre-match parade at the Cork–Waterford All-Ireland semi-final (13 August 2017).

The 2017 All-Ireland Senior Hurling Championship was the 130th staging of the All-Ireland Senior Hurling Championship since its establishment by the Gaelic Athletic Association in 1887. The championship began on 23 April 2017 and ended on 3 September 2017. The draw for the championship was held on 13 October 2016 and was broadcast live on RTÉ2.

Tipperary, the 2016 champions, were defeated by Galway in the All-Ireland semi-final. Meath fielded a team in the championship for the first time since 2004.

On 3 September 2017 Galway won the championship following a 0–26 to 2–17 defeat of Waterford in the All-Ireland final. This was their fifth All-Ireland title and their first in 29 championship seasons.

== Format ==
The All-Ireland Senior Hurling Championship was a double-elimination tournament based on the Leinster and Munster provincial championships and the Christy Ring Cup. Fifteen teams took part.

The 2017 championship was the last to feature mostly knock-out Leinster and Munster championships. On 30 September 2017, the Special Congress held at Croke Park voted by 62% to restructure the Leinster and Munster championships as two provincial groups of five teams who competed on a round-robin basis.

=== Provincial championships ===
Connacht Senior Hurling Championship

This competition is no longer organised. Galway represents Connacht and participates in the Leinster Championship. The other Connacht teams could compete in the 2017 All-Ireland Senior Hurling Championship (tier 1) by gaining promotion through the tiers of hurling – the Christy Ring Cup (tier 2), the Nicky Rackard Cup (tier 3) and the Lory Meagher Cup (tier 4).

Leinster Senior Hurling Championship

Nine counties competed – seven from Leinster plus Galway and Kerry. 2016 Leinster champions received a bye in the semi-final. The championship began with a qualifier group involving the four weakest teams. The group winners and runners-up join four of the five strongest teams in the three Leinster quarter finals as the competition continued in a knock-out format. Two semi-finals and a final followed.

The 2016 Leinster champions received a bye into the semi finals. The remaining six teams (four seeded teams plus the qualifier group winners and runners-up) played in three quarter-finals. An informal system of promotion or relegation operated in this round; if a team from the qualifier group won their quarter-final, they were seeded in the 2017 Leinster championship and the beaten seeded team competed in the 2017 Leinster qualifier

In 2017 the bottom team in the Leinster qualifier group was relegated to the 2018 Christy Ring Cup (2nd tier). Their place in the 2018 Leinster qualifier group was taken by the winner of 2017's Christy Ring Cup.

Meath qualified for the 2017 Leinster Championship by winning the 2016 Christy Ring Cup.

Munster Senior Hurling Championship

Five of the six Munster counties competed. Kerry participated in The Leinster Hurling Championship (see above). The competition was a knock-out format. All of the beaten teams entered the All-Ireland qualifiers.

Ulster Senior Hurling Championship

Although this competition takes place, it is not part of the All-Ireland Senior Hurling Championship. Currently no Ulster teams qualified to play in the 2017 Leinster championship which means that winning the Christy Ring cup is their only route into the 2017 All-Ireland Senior Hurling Championship.

=== Qualifiers Format ===
A total of nine teams enter the qualifiers – five of the seven teams eliminated in Leinster before the final (three losing quarter-finalists and two losing semi-finalists), all three teams knocked-out in Munster before the final and the winners of 2017's Christy Ring Cup.

The fixtures are decided by draws which are detailed in the sections below. All qualifier matches are knock-out and eventually result in two teams who progress to the two All-Ireland quarter-finals.

==== Qualifiers Preliminary round ====
The GAA congress held in February 2017 voted to allow the winners of the 2017 Christy Ring cup to enter the 2017 qualifiers in a new preliminary round. The Christy Ring cup winners played the losers of one of the three Leinster quarter finals.

==== Qualifiers Round 1 Format ====
After the qualifiers preliminary round, the eight remaining qualifier teams played in four matches. A draw was made such that the three Munster teams were paired with three teams beaten in the Leinster championship. Teams who had already met in the Leinster championship could not be drawn to meet again if such a pairing could be avoided. The draw was made on the morning of the 26 June.

==== Qualifiers Round 2 Format ====
The four winners of round 1 played in two matches. Teams who had already met in the Leinster or Munster championships could not be drawn to meet again if such a pairing could be avoided.

=== All-Ireland Format ===
The beaten finalists in the Leinster and Munster championships played the two winning teams from round two of the qualifiers in the two All-Ireland quarter-finals. In the semi-finals, the Leinster and Munster champions played the winners of the two quarter finals. The final normally takes place on the first Sunday in September.

== Team changes ==
=== To Championship ===
Promoted from the Christy Ring Cup

- Meath

=== From Championship ===
Relegated to the Christy Ring Cup

- Carlow

Note: 2017 Christy Ring Cup winners (Carlow) entered All-Ireland qualifiers.

== Teams ==
=== General information ===
Fifteen counties competed in the All-Ireland Senior Hurling Championship: nine teams in the Leinster Senior Hurling Championship, five teams in the Munster Senior Hurling Championship and one team in the Christy Ring Cup.

County	Last provincial title	Last championship title	Position in 2016 championship	Current championship
Carlow	—	—	Group Stage (Leinster Senior Hurling Championship)	Christy Ring Cup
Clare	1998	2013	Quarter-finals	Munster Senior Hurling Championship
Cork	2014	2005	Round 2	Munster Senior Hurling Championship
Dublin	2013	1938	Round 1	Leinster Senior Hurling Championship
Galway	2012	1988	Semi-finals	Leinster Senior Hurling Championship
Kerry	1891	1891	Group Stage (Leinster Senior Hurling Championship)	Leinster Senior Hurling Championship
Kilkenny	2016	2015	Runners-up	Leinster Senior Hurling Championship
Laois	1949	1915	Round 1	Leinster Senior Hurling Championship
Limerick	2013	1973	Round 2	Munster Senior Hurling Championship
Meath	—	—	Champions (Christy Ring Cup)	Leinster Senior Hurling Championship
Offaly	1995	1998	Round 1	Leinster Senior Hurling Championship
Tipperary	2016	2016	Champions	Munster Senior Hurling Championship
Waterford	2010	1959	Semi-finals	Munster Senior Hurling Championship
Westmeath	—	—	Round 1	Leinster Senior Hurling Championship
Wexford	2004	1996	Quarter-finals	Leinster Senior Hurling Championship

=== Personnel and kits ===
Team	Sponsor	Captain(s)	Vice-captain(s)	Manager(s)				
Team	Sponsor	Captain(s)	Vice-captain(s)	Manager(s)	Clare	Pat O'Donnell	Pat O'Connor	Donal Moloney; Gerry O'Connor
Cork	Chill Insurance	Stephen McDonnell	Séamus Harnedy	Kieran Kingston				
Dublin	AIG	Liam Rushe		Ger Cunningham				
Galway	Supermac's	David Burke		Micheal Donoghue				
Kerry	Kerry Group	Aiden McCabe		Fintan O'Connor				
Kilkenny	Glanbia	Mark Bergin		Brian Cody				
Laois	MW Hire Services	Ross King		Éamonn Kelly				
Limerick	Sporting Limerick	James Ryan	Diarmaid Byrnes; Gearóid Hegarty	John Kiely				
Meath	Uniflu	Damien Healy		Martin Ennis				
Offaly	Carroll Cuisine	Seán Ryan		Kevin Ryan				
Tipperary	Intersport/Elverys	Pádraic Maher	Séamus Callanan	Michael Ryan				
Waterford	3	Kevin Moran		Derek McGrath				
Westmeath	Renault	Aonghus Clarke		Michael Ryan				
Wexford	Gain	Lee Chin; Matthew O'Hanlon		Davy Fitzgerald				

== Summary ==
=== Championships ===
Level on Pyramid	Competition	Champions	Runners-up
Tier 1	2017 All-Ireland Senior Hurling Championship	Galway	Waterford
Tier 1	2017 Leinster Senior Hurling Championship	Galway	Wexford
Tier 1	2017 Munster Senior Hurling Championship	Cork	Clare
Tier 1	2017 Ulster Senior Hurling Championship	Antrim	Armagh
Tier 2	2017 Christy Ring Cup	Carlow	Antrim
Tier 2	2017 Ulster Senior Hurling Shield	Derry	Tyrone
Tier 3	2017 Nicky Rackard Cup	Derry	Armagh
Tier 4	2017 Lory Meagher Cup	Warwickshire	Leitrim

== Provincial championships ==
=== Leinster Senior Hurling Championship ===
==== Group Stage ====
Pos	Team	Pld	W	D	L	SF	SA	SD	Pts	Qualification
1	Laois	3	3	0	0	6–69	7–45	21	6	Advance to Knockout Stage
2	Westmeath	3	1	0	2	5–45	1–62	−3	2	Advance to Knockout Stage
3	Kerry	3	1	0	2	5–52	7–53	−7	2	
4	Meath	3	1	0	2	5–52	6–60	−11	2	Relegated to Christy Ring Cup
Westmeath, Kerry and Meath were ranked according to score difference.

==== Leinster Knockout Stage ====
Quarter-finals
Laois	1–17
Wexford	3–25
Westmeath	1–20
Offaly	4–15
Galway	2–28
Dublin	1–17

Semi-finals
Wexford	1–20
Kilkenny	3–11
Offaly	1–11
Galway	0–33

Final
Wexford	1–17
Galway	0–29

==== Matches ====
23 April 2017
15:00
Round 1

Meath	3–20 – 2–17	Kerry
S Clynch (0–7, 6fs), S Quigley (1–3, 1–0 sideline), K Keena (1–0), C McCabe (1–0), A Gannon (0–3), M O’Sullivan (0–2), D Kelly (0–1), K Keoghan (0–1); A Forde (0–1), G McGowan (0–1), N Heffernan (0–1).	Report	S Nolan (1–9, 0-6fs), M Boyle (1–1), M O'Leary (0–2), M O'Connor (0–1), B Murphy (0–1), J Conway (0–1), P Lucid (0–1), J Goulding (0–1).

Páirc Tailteann, Navan
Attendance: 1,000
Referee: S Cleere (Kilkenny)
23 April 2017
Round 1

Laois	1–23 – 2–17	Westmeath
R King (0–10, 8f, 1'65), S Maher (0–4), P Whelan (1–0), A Dunphy (0–3), C Dwyer (0–2), P Purcell (0–1); C Taylor (0–1), W Dunphy (0–1), E Rowland (0–1).	Report	A Devine (0–5, 3f), R Greville (1–1), N Mitchell (0–4); E Price (1–0), P Greville (0–2, 1f), D McNicholas (0–1), G Greville (0–1), C Boyle (0–1); S McGovern (0–1), J Galvin (0–1).

O'Moore Park, Portlaoise
Referee: J Owens (Wexford)

30 April 2017
15:00
Round 2

Westmeath	2–12 – 0–20	Kerry
A Devine (0-08, 0–06 frees, 0-01 ’65), K Doyle (1-02, 1–00 pen, 0-01 free, 0-01 ’65), N Mitchell (1-00), R Greville (0-02).	Report	S Nolan (0-07, 0–01 ’65, 0–04 frees), M Boyle (0-04), P Boyle (0-03), J Conway (0-02), M O’Leary (0-01), J Goulding (0–01), P O’Connor (0-01); J O’Connor (0-01).

Cusack Park, Mullingar
Referee: P O’Dwyer (Carlow)
30 April 2017
15:00
Round 2

Meath	2–13 – 3–25	Laois
S Clynch (0-06, 0-04f, 0-01 '65), N Heffernan (1-01), J Keena (1-00); S Brennan (0-01), K Keoghan (0-01), S Quigley (0-01), A Forde (0-01), M O'Sullivan (0-01), A Gannon (0-01).	Report	P Purcell (3-06); R King (0–11, 0-06f, 0-01 65), N Foyle (0-02), A Corby (0-02), S Downey (0-01), W Dunphy (0-01), B Conroy (0-01), A Dunphy (0-01).

Páirc Tailteann, Navan
Referee: J Keenan (Wicklow)

14 May 2017
15:00
Round 3

Westmeath	1–18 – 0–19	Meath
A Devine (0-09, 0–06 frees), K Doyle (1-03), R Greville (0-02), A Clarke (0-02), D McNicholas (0-01), C Boyle (0-01).	Report	S Clynch (0-05, 0–03 frees), A Gannon (0-04), D Kelly (0-02, 0–01 free), K Keoghan (0-02); J Kelly (0-02), G McGowan (0-01), S Quigley (0-02 frees), M O’Sullivan (0-01).

Cusack Park, Mullingar
14 May 2017
15:00
Round 3

Kerry	3–15 – 2–21	Laois
S Nolan 2–6 (0–4 frees, 0–1 65), M Boyle 1–2 (frees), J O'Connor, J Buckley, M Boyle, J Conway, J Griffin, P Lucid, B Murphy 0–1 each.	Report	R King 0–13 (0–11 frees, 0–1 65), P Purcell 1–2, N Foyle 1–0, S Bergin, M Kavanagh, A Corby, S Maher, A Dunphy, S Downey 0–1 each.

Austin Stack Park, Tralee
Referee: A Kelly (Galway)

Leinster Quarter-finals

27 May 2017
19:00
Quarter-final

Westmeath	1–20 – 4–15	Offaly
A Devine 0–10 (0-8f, 1 '65), K Doyle 1–2, J Boyle 0–3, N O'Brien 0–2 (1 sl), A Clarke, R Greville, D Egerton 0–1 each.	Report	S Dooley 3–8 (1–0 pen, 0-5f), E Nolan 1–1, O Kelly 0–2, D Shortt, P Guinan, J Bergin, L Langton 0–1 each

Cusack Park, Mullingar
Attendance: 3,105
Referee: S Cleere (Kilkenny)
28 May 2017
14:00
Quarter-final

Laois	1–17 – 3–25	Wexford
R King 0–7 (5f), P Purcell 1–1, A Dunphy 0–2, C Collier, C Dwyer, S Downey, J Lennon, W Dunphy, S Maher & C Taylor 0–1 each.	Report	C McDonald 0–9 (0-4f, 1 '65), H Kehoe 1–2, P Morris 0–5, A Nolan 1–1, J Guiney 1–0, L Chin 0–3 (0-1f), J O’Connor 0–2, S Murphy, D O’Keeffe & D Redmond 0–1 each.

O'Moore Park, Portlaoise
Referee: C McAllister (Cork)
28 May 2017
16:00
Quarter-final

Galway	2–28 – 1–17	Dublin
J Canning 0–9 (0-5f), C Cooney 1–3, C Whelan 0–5, J Flynn 1–2, D Burke 0–3, N Burke 0–2, J Cooney, C Mannion, T Monaghan, É Burke 0–1 each.	Report	D Treacy 0–5 (0-4f), B Quinn 1–0, D Burke 0–3 (0-2f), C Crummey, É Dillon, J Hetherton (0-1f) 0–2 each, S Barrett, R McBride, F Whitely 0–1 each.

O'Connor Park, Tullamore
Attendance: 14,291
Referee: B Kelly (Westmeath)

==== Leinster Semi-finals ====
The 2016 Leinster champions received a bye into the semi-finals. They were joined by the winners of the three quarter-finals.

10 June 2017
19:00
Semi-final

Wexford	1–20 – 3–11	Kilkenny
L Chin 0–6 (0-3f, 0–2 65), C McDonald 0–5 (0-4f), P Morris 0–3, D Redmond 1–0, M O’Hanlon, D O’Keeffe, L Ryan, J O’Connor and S Tomkins 0–1 each.	Report	TJ Reid 2–7 (2–0 pen, 0-6f, 0–1 65), C Fennelly 1–0, L Ryan 0–2, W Walsh and P Deegan 0–1 each.

Wexford Park, Wexford
Attendance: 18,467
Referee: F Horan (Tipperary)
18 June 2017
14:00
Semi-final

Offaly	1–11 – 0–33	Galway
S Dooley 0–9 (0-6f, 0–1 65), O Kelly 1–0, E Nolan 0–1, L Langton 0–1.	Report	J Canning 0–7 (0-6f), C Whelan 0–7, N Burke 0–5, S Maloney 0–4, A Harte 0–3, P Mannion 0–2, C Mannion 0–2, J Coen 0–2, C Cooney 0–1.

O'Moore Park, Portlaoise
Attendance: 6,292
Referee: J Ryan (Tipperary)

==== Leinster final ====
2 July 2017
16:00
Final

Wexford	1–17 – 0–29	Galway
D O’Keeffe 1–1, C McDonald 0–6 (0-3f), L Chin 0–4 (0-2f, 0–1 65), P Morris and M O’Hanlon 0–2 each, W Devereux, J O’Connor and C Dunbar 0–1 each.	Report	J Canning 0–10 (0-8f, 0–1 65, 0–1 sideline), C Cooney 0–8 (0-1f), J Cooney 0–5, N Burke 0–2, D Burke, P Mannion, T Monaghan and S Maloney 0–1 each.

Croke Park, Dublin
Attendance: 60,032
Referee: C Lyons (Cork)

=== Munster Senior Hurling Championship ===
Quarter-finals
Tipperary	1–26
Cork	2–27

Semi-finals
Limerick	2–16
Clare	3–17
Waterford	1–15
Cork	0–23

Final
Clare	1–20
Cork	1–25

==== Munster Quarter-final ====
21 May 2017
16:00
Quarter-final

Tipperary	1–26 – 2–27	Cork
M Breen, S Callanan (4f) 0–6 each, J McGrath 1–1, D McCormack, N McGrath 0–3 each, J O'Dwyer (1 sideline), B Maher 0–2 each, P Maher, N O'Meara, S Curran 0–1 each.	Report	C Lehane (0-4f, 1'65) 0–10, S Kingston 1–4, P Horgan 0–4, M Cahalane 1–0, A Cadogan, L Meade 0–3 each, S Harnedy 0–2, L O'Farrell 0–1.

Semple Stadium, Thurles
Attendance: 30,103
Referee: J Owens (Wexford)

==== Munster Semi-finals ====
4 June 2017
16:00
Semi-final

Limerick	2–16 – 3–17	Clare
S Dowling 0–7 (0-7f), D Dempsey, K Hayes 1–1 each, P Browne (0–1 sideline), C Lynch 0–2 each, P Casey, P Ryan, B Nash 0–1 each.	Report	S O’Donnell 2–2, C McGrath 1–3, D Reidy 0–5 (0-5f), J Conlon 0–2, C Cleary, I Galvin, J McCarthy, C Galvin 0–1 each.

Semple Stadium, Thurles
Attendance: 19,168
Referee: J McGrath (Westmeath)
18 June 2017
16:00
Semi-final

Waterford	1–15 – 0–23	Cork
Pauric Mahony 0–5 (0-1f), M Shanahan 1–1 (0-1f), S Bennett, A Gleeson, J Barron 0–2 each, B O’Halloran, S Bennett, K Moran 0–1 each.	Report	P Horgan 0–10 (0-7f, 0–1 ’65), C Lehane 0–4, S Harnedy 0–2, M Ellis, M Coleman (0–1 sideline), B Cooper, D Fitzgibbon, A Cadogan, M Cahalane, L O’Farrell 0–1 each.

Semple Stadium, Thurles
Attendance: 33,163
Referee: B Kelly (Westmeath)

==== Munster final ====
9 July 2017
Final

Clare	1–20 – 1–25	Cork
T Kelly 0–10 (0-6f, 0-1pen), C McGrath 1–1, J Conlon 0–2, P Collins, A Cunningham, C Galvin, J McCarthy, D McInerney, S Morey and A Shanagher 0–1 each.	Report	P Horgan 0–13 (0-10f), A Cadogan 1–4, M Coleman (0–1 sideline) and S Harnedy 0–2 each, D Fitzgibbon, S Kingston, C Lehane and L Meade 0–1 each.

Semple Stadium, Thurles
Attendance: 45,558
Referee: F Horan (Tipperary)

=== Ulster Senior Hurling Championship ===
Semi-finals
Armagh	1–17
Down	2–12
Antrim	3–24
Donegal	1–10

Final
Armagh	1–12
Antrim	5–22

==== Ulster Semi-finals ====
8 April 2017
3 p.m.
Semi-final

Armagh	1–17 – 2–12	Down
	Report

Inniskeen Grattan's GAC, Inniskeen
8 April 2017
3 p.m.
Semi-final

Antrim	3–24 – 1–10	Donegal
	Report

Celtic Park, Derry

==== Ulster final ====
16 April 2017
2:30 p.m.
Final

Antrim	5–22 – 1–12	Armagh
C Johnston 3-05, N McManus 1-06 (1f), P Shiels 1-00, E Campbell 0-03, M Connolly 0-03 (2f), C Clarke 0-02, P McGill 0-01, C McKinley 0-01, C Carson 0-01	Report	D Carvill 0-07 (6f), F Bradley 1-00, C Corvan 0-03, C Carvill 0-01, D Magee 0-01

Owenbeg Centre of Excellence, Dungiven
Referee: James Clarke (Cavan)

== All-Ireland Qualifiers ==
=== Qualifiers preliminary round ===
==== Match ====
25 June 2017
Preliminary match

Laois	2–14 – 1–16	Carlow
S Downey & N Foyle 1–1 each, S Maher 0–3 (2f), E Rowland (2f), P Purcell & C Healy 0–2 each, R King (f), M Kavanagh & C Taylor 0–1 each.	Report	M Kavanagh 1–2, C Nolan 0–4 (2f), P Coady 0–3 (1f), D Murphy (2f) & D Byrne 0–2 each, JM Nolan, J Doyle & E Byrne 0–1 each.

O'Moore Park, Portlaoise
Referee: D Kirwan (Cork)

=== Qualifiers Round 1 ===
==== Matches ====
1 July 2017
15:00
Round 1

Offaly	0–14 – 1–35	Waterford
S Dooley (0–5, 0–5); J Bergin (0–3, 0–2 frees); S Kinsella, B Conneely, E Nolan, O Kelly, J Mulrooney, P Guinan (0–1 each).	Report	Pauric Mahony (0–11, 0–7 frees, 0–1 ’65); A Gleeson (0–6); P Curran (0–4, 0–2 frees, 0–1 ’65); Shane Bennett (1–0); K Moran, D Fives, J Barron, M Shanahan, C Dunford (0–2 each); J Dillon, T De Burca, T Ryan, M Walsh (0–1 each).

Bord na Móna O'Connor Park, Tullamore
Attendance: 4,159
Referee: A Kelly (Galway)
1 July 2017
17:00
Round 1

Tipperary	2–18 – 0–15	Westmeath
J O’Dwyer 1–3 (0-1f), S Callanan 0–5 (4f, 1 65), J McGrath 1–1, N McGrath, N O’Meara & J Forde 0–2 each, R Maher, B Maher & P Maher 0–1 each.	Report	A Devine 0–6 (4f), P Greville (1f) & K Doyle 0–2 each, A Clarke, R Greville, D McNicholas, N O’Brien & C Boyle 0–1 each.

Semple Stadium, Thurles
Attendance: 6,893
Referee: P O'Dwyer (Carlow)
1 July 2017
19:00
Round 1

Dublin	2–28 – 1–15	Laois
É Dillon 2–4, D Treacy 0–9 (0-6f), B Quinn and C O’Sullivan 0–3 each, D Burke, F Whitely and D O’Callaghan 0–2 each, N McMorrow, S Barrett and J Hetherton 0–1 each.	Report	P Purcell and M Kavanagh 0–5 each (0-2f), E Rowland 1–1 (all frees), M Whelan, C Collier, C Taylor and C Healy 0–1 each.

Parnell Park, Dublin
Attendance: 6,241
Referee: J Keenan (Wicklow)
1 July 2017
19:00
Round 1

Kilkenny	0–20 – 0–17	Limerick
TJ Reid 0–8 (0-6f), W Walsh 0–4, P Deegan 0–3, K Kelly, L Ryan 0–2 each, C Bolger 0–1.	Report	S Dowling 0–8 (0-6f), P Casey 0–3, G Hegarty, K Hayes 0–2 each, P Ryan, B Nash 0–1 each.

Nowlan Park, Kilkenny
Attendance: 15,605
Referee: B Gavin (Offaly)

=== Qualifiers Round 2 ===
==== Matches ====
8 July 2017
17:00
Round 2

Tipperary	6–26 – 1–19	Dublin
S Callanan 3–11 (0-7f), J McGrath 2–2, J O’Dwyer, J Forde 0–4 each, M Breen 1–0, S O’Brien 0–2, P Maher, B Maher, D McCormack 0–1 each.	Report	D Treacy 0–11 (0-8f), C O’Sullivan 1–1, L Rushe, R O’Dwyer 0–2 each, C Crummey, D O’Callaghan, R McBride 0–1 each.

Semple Stadium, Thurles
Attendance: 33,181
Referee: A Kelly (Galway)
8 July 2017
19:00
Round 2

Waterford	4–23 – 2–22 (AET)	Kilkenny
Pauric Mahony 0–6 (0-5f, 0–1 ’65), J Barron, M Shanahan (0-3f) 1–3 each, A Gleeson 0–5, Shane Bennett, M Walsh 1–0 each, T Ryan, K Moran 0–2 each, J Dillon, P Curran 0–1 each.	Report	TJ Reid 2–12 (0-10f, 0–1 ’65, 1–0 pen), L Ryan 0–3, R Leahy 0–2, R Hogan, E Murphy (0-1f), C Fennelly, G Aylward, K Kelly 0–1 each.

Semple Stadium, Thurles
Attendance: 33,181
Referee: J Owens (Wexford)

== All-Ireland Senior Hurling Championship ==
=== Bracket ===
Quarter-finals
Clare	3–16
Tipperary	0–28
Wexford	1–19
Waterford	1–23

Semi-finals
Galway	0–22
Tipperary	1–18
Cork	0–20
Waterford	4–19

Final
Galway	0–26
Waterford	2–17

=== All-Ireland Quarter-finals ===
22 July 2017
15:00
Quarter-final

Tipperary	0–28 – 3–16	Clare
S Callanan 0–7 (3f), J McGrath 0–6, N McGrath 0–4, J O’Dwyer 0–4 (1f), P Maher 0–2, M Breen 0–1, S Kennedy 0–1, B Maher 0–1 (f), S O’Brien 0–1, J Forde 0–1	Report	T Kelly 0–6 (4f), A Cunningham 2–0, C McInerney 1–1, S O’Donnell 0–2, C McGrath 0–2, D Reidy 0–2 (2f), P Duggan 0–1, J Shanahan 0–1, C Galvin 0–1

Páirc Uí Chaoimh, Cork
Attendance: 28,567
Referee: Colm Lyons (Cork)
23 July 2017
16:00
Quarter-final

Wexford	1–19 – 1–23	Waterford
J Guiney 0-06 (6f), J O’Connor 1–2, L Chinn 0–3, (2f), R O’Connor, D O’Keeffe 0–2 each, C McDonald, P Morris, E Moore, L Ryan 0–1 each	Report	Pauric Mahony 0–9 (0-9f), K Moran 1–3, A Gleeson 0–3 (0-1f), B O’Halloran, M Shanahan 0–2 each, C Gleeson, J Dillon, M Walsh, D Fives 0–1 each.

Páirc Uí Chaoimh, Cork
Attendance: 31,753
Referee: F Horgan (Tipperary)

=== All-Ireland Semi-finals ===
6 August 2017
16:00
Semi-final

Galway	0–22 – 1–18	Tipperary
J Canning 0–11 (0-6f, 0–1 '65, 0–1 sideline), C Whelan 0–4, C Cooney and J Coen 0–2 each, J Cooney, P Mannion (0-1f), C Mannion 0–1 each.	Report	S Callanan 0–5 (0-3f), J McGrath 1–1, J O’Dwyer and B Maher (0-2f) 0–3 each, N McGrath and P Maher 0–2 each, J Forde and S Kennedy 0–1 each.

Croke Park, Dublin
Attendance: 68,184
Referee: B Kelly (Westmeath)
13 August 2017
15:30
Semi-final

Cork	0–20 – 4–19	Waterford
P Horgan 0–12 (7f); A Cadogan, C Lehane 0–2; S Kingston, D Fitzgibbon (sideline), S Harnedy, L O’Farrell 0–1	Report	Pauric Mahony 0–8 (5f), J Barron 2–1; K Moran 0–4; A Gleeson 1–2, M Walsh 1–0; D Fives, C Gleeson, B O’Halloran, M Shanahan 0–1

Croke Park, Dublin
Attendance: 72,022
Referee: J Owens (Wexford)

=== All-Ireland final ===
3 September 2017
15:30
Final

Galway	0–26 – 2–17	Waterford
J Canning 0–9 (6f, 1 sideline), David Burke 0–4, C Cooney 0–3, C Mannion 0–2, N Burke 0–2, J Cooney 0–2, J Flynn 0–2, J Coen 0–1, C Whelan 0–1.	Report	Pauric Mahony 0–11 (7f), K Moran 1–1, K Bennett 1–0, J Barron 0–2, M Walsh 0–1, B O'Halloran 0–1, T Ryan 0–1.

Croke Park, Dublin
Attendance: 82,300
Referee: Fergal Horgan (Tipperary)

== Championship Statistics ==
=== Top scorer overall ===
Rank	Player	County	Tally	Total	Matches	Average
1	Pauric Mahony	Waterford	0–50	50	6	8.33
2	Joe Canning	Galway	0–46	46	5	9.20
3	Séamus Callanan	Tipperary	3–34	43	5	8.60
4	Ross King	Laois	0–42	42	5	8.40
5	T. J. Reid	Kilkenny	4–27	39	3	13.00
5	Patrick Horgan	Cork	0–39	39	4	9.75
7	Allan Devine	Westmeath	0–38	38	5	7.60
8	Patrick Purcell	Laois	5–17	32	6	5.33
9	Shane Nolan	Kerry	3–22	31	3	10.33
9	Shane Dooley	Offaly	3–22	31	3	10.33

=== Top scorer in a single game ===
Rank	Player	County	Tally	Total	Opposition
1	Séamus Callanan	Tipperary	3–11	20	Dublin
2	T. J. Reid	Kilkenny	2–12	18	Waterford
3	Shane Dooley	Offaly	3-08	17	Westmeath
4	Patrick Purcell	Laois	3-06	15	Meath
5	T. J. Reid	Kilkenny	2-07	13	Wexford
5	Ross King	Laois	0–13	13	Kerry
5	Patrick Horgan	Cork	0–13	13	Clare
8	Shane Nolan	Kerry	2-06	12	Laois
8	Shane Nolan	Kerry	1-09	12	Meath
8	Patrick Horgan	Cork	0–12	12	Waterford

=== Clean sheets ===
Rank	Goalkeeper	County	Clean sheets
1	Stephen O'Keeffe	Waterford	4
2	Paddy Moloney	Westmeath	2
3	Eoin Murphy	Kilkenny	1
3	Nickie Quaid	Limerick	1
3	Mark Fanning	Wexford	1
3	James Dempsey	Offaly	1
3	Andrew Fahy	Clare	1
3	Daragh Mooney	Tipperary	1
3	Darren Gleeson	Tipperary	1

=== Scoring events ===
Widest winning margin: 24 points

- Waterford 1–35 – 0–14 Offaly (Qualifier Round 1)

Most goals in a match: 7

- Tipperary 6–26 – 1–19 Dublin (Qualifier Round 2)

Most points in a match: 53

- Cork 2-27 – 1-26 Tipperary (Munster quarter-final)

Most goals by one team in a match: 6

- Tipperary 6–26 – 1–19 Dublin (Qualifier Round 2)

Highest aggregate score: 66

- Tipperary 6–26 – 1–19 Dublin (Qualifier Round 2)

Lowest aggregate score: 37

- Kilkenny 0–20 – 0–17 Limerick (Qualifier Round 1)

Most goals scored by a losing team: 3

- Wexford 1–20 – 3–11 Kilkenny (Leinster semi-final)
- Tipperary 0–28 – 3–16 Clare (All-Ireland quarter-final)

== Miscellaneous ==
- Galway won their first All-Ireland since 1988.
- It was the first meeting of Galway and Waterford in an All-Ireland Hurling Final.
- Wexford defeated Kilkenny in the Leinster Championship for the first time since 2004.
- Waterford set a championship record by scoring 35 points against Offaly in their All-Ireland qualifier meeting.
- First time championship meetings:
  - Tipperary v Westmeath (Qualifiers round 1)
- Galway played Wexford in their first ever Leinster final meeting. The game set a new attendance record of 60,032 who saw Galway win their second Leinster senior championship.
- Waterford defeated Kilkenny in the championship for the first time since 1959.
- This was the first year Meath competed in the championship since 2004.
- In the Munster final, Patrick Horgan scored 0–13 to overtake Christy Ring's total of 33–205 to become Cork's top scorer of all time.
- The first final since 1996 not to involve one of the "Big Three" counties (Cork, Kilkenny and Tipperary).
- Galway defeated Waterford for the very first time in the senior hurling championship.
- A peak audience of 1.1 million watched Galway beat Waterford in the hurling final on RTÉ, making it the most watched programme on RTÉ in 2017 at the time.
- For the first time in championship history, no county from Leinster reached the All-Ireland semi-final stage, with the four spots going to Cork, Galway, Tipperary and Waterford. (Galway currently play in the Leinster Championship but are geographically in Connacht.)
- Kilkenny were eliminated in the qualifiers for the first time.

== Broadcast Rights ==
Matches will be broadcast live on television in Ireland on RTÉ and Sky Sports under a new five-year contract that was agreed in December 2016. In the United Kingdom, matches will be shown on Sky Sports and worldwide coverage will be provided on GAAGO. RTÉ Radio 1 will also have full radio rights to all championship games which were previously shared with Newstalk.

RTÉ coverage will be shown on RTÉ One on The Sunday Game Live presented by Michael Lyster in high definition. Des Cahill will present The Sunday Game highlights and analysis show on Sunday evening.

=== Live Hurling On TV ===
RTÉ, the national broadcaster in Ireland, will provide the majority of the live television coverage of the championship in the first year of a five-year deal running from 2017 until 2021. Sky Sports will also broadcast a number of matches and will have exclusive rights to some games.

Live Hurling On TV Schedule
Date	Fixture & Match Details	RTÉ Sky Sports
Provincial and Qualifier Hurling Matches
21 May	Tipperary v Cork; Munster Quarter-final	RTÉ
28 May	Galway v Dublin; Leinster Quarter-final	RTÉ
4 June	Clare v Limerick; Munster Semi-final	Sky Sports
10 June	Kilkenny v Wexford; Leinster Semi-final	Sky Sports
18 June	Cork v Waterford; Munster Semi-final	RTÉ
1 July	Kilkenny v Limerick; Qualifier Round 1	Sky Sports
2 July	Galway v Wexford; Leinster Final	RTÉ
8 July	Kilkenny v Waterford; Qualifier Round 2	Sky Sports
9 July	Cork v Clare; Munster Final	RTÉ
All-Ireland Hurling Quarter-finals
22 July	Tipperary v Clare	RTÉ
23 July	Waterford v Wexford	RTÉ
All-Ireland Hurling Semi-finals
6 August	Galway v Tipperary	RTÉ & Sky Sports
13 August	Waterford v Cork	RTÉ & Sky Sports
All-Ireland Hurling Final
3 September	Galway v Waterford	RTÉ & Sky Sports

== Awards ==
Sunday Game Team of the Year

The Sunday Game team of the year was picked on 3 September, which was the night of the final. The panel consisting of Brendan Cummins, Michael Duignan, Tomás Mulcahy, Jackie Tyrrell, Anthony Daly, Eddie Brennan and Cyril Farrell unanimously selected Galway's Gearóid McInerney as the Sunday game player of the year.

- Anthony Nash (Cork)
- Adrian Tuohy (Galway)
- Daithí Burke (Galway)
- Noel Connors (Waterford)
- Pádraic Mannion (Galway)
- Gearóid McInerney (Galway)
- Padraic Maher (Tipperary)
- Jamie Barron (Waterford)
- David Burke (Galway)
- Kevin Moran (Waterford)
- Joe Canning (Galway)
- Michael ‘Brick’ Walsh (Waterford)
- Conor Whelan (Galway)
- Conor Cooney (Galway)
- Patrick Horgan (Cork)

All Star Team of the Year

On 2 November, the 2017 PwC All-Stars winners were announced. On 3 November 2017 at the presentation of the All-Star awards, Joe Canning was named as the All Stars Hurler of the Year with Conor Whelan named the All Stars Young Hurler of the Year.

- Stephen O’Keeffe (Waterford)
- Padraic Mannion (Galway)
- Daithí Burke (Galway)
- Noel Connors (Waterford)
- Padraic Maher (Tipperary)
- Gearóid McInerney (Galway)
- Mark Coleman (Cork)
- Jamie Barron (Waterford)
- David Burke (Galway)
- Kevin Moran (Waterford)
- Joe Canning (Galway)
- Michael Walsh (Waterford)
- Conor Whelan (Galway)
- Conor Cooney (Galway)
- Patrick Horgan (Cork)

== See also ==
- 2017 Ulster Senior Hurling Championship
- 2017 Christy Ring Cup
- 2017 Nicky Rackard Cup
- 2017 Lory Meagher Cup
- Tipperary senior hurling team season 2017
- Galway senior hurling team season 2017
