= Andrew Fahy =

Irish hurler

Sport
- Sport: Hurling
- Position: Goalkeeper
Club
- Years: Club
- Whitegate
Inter-county*
Years	County	Apps (scores)
2015-present	Clare	1
Inter-county titles
- Munster titles: 0
- All-Irelands: 0
- NHL: 0
- All Stars: 0
- *Inter County team apps and scores correct as of 23:08, 9 May 2016.

Andrew Fahy is an Irish hurler who plays as a goalkeeper for the Clare senior team and plays club hurling for Whitegate.

On 4 June 2017, Fahy started his first Championship game as Clare defeated Limerick in the Munster Senior Hurling Championship semi-final at Semple Stadium on a 2-16 to 3-17 scoreline.

== Honours ==
Clare

- All-Ireland Intermediate Hurling Championship (1): 2011
- Munster Intermediate Hurling Championship (1): 2011
