= 2019 Kerry Senior Hurling Championship =

Annual hurling competition season

- Dates: 6 July – 25 August 2019
- Teams: 8
- Sponsor: Garvey's SuperValu
- Champions: Causeway (8th title); Muiris Delaney (captain); Stephen Goggin (manager)
- Runners-up: Lixnaw; Michael Conway (captain); Mark Foley (manager)

Tournament statistics
- Matches played: 15
- Goals scored: 29 (1.93 per match)
- Points scored: 478 (31.87 per match)
- Top scorer(s): Shane Nolan (5-44)

The 2019 Kerry Senior Hurling Championship was the 118th staging of the Kerry Senior Hurling Championship since its establishment by the Kerry County Board in 1889. The championship ran from 6 July to 25 August 2019.

Lixnaw entered the championship as the defending champions.

The final was played on 25 August 2019 at Austin Stack Park in Tralee, between Causeway and Lixnaw, in what was their second meeting in the final overall and a first final meeting in 37 years. Causeway won the match by 2–13 to 1–13 to claim a record-equalling eighth championship title overall and a first title in 21 years.

Shane Nolan was the championship's top scorer with 5-44.

== Results ==
=== Round 1 ===
6 July 2019 Round 1	St Brendan's	1-21 - 1-19 (aet)	Abbeydorney	Austin Stack Park
	J Egan (1-3; 0-2f), T Hannafin (0-6, 4f, 1 '65'), S O'Halloran (0-3), B O'Connor (0-2), N O'Driscoll (0-2), K Hannifin (0-2), D Dineen (0-1), D Griffin (0-1), T Moloney (0-1).	Report	PJ Keane (1-7; 0-6 f), M O'Leary (0-4), S O'Sullivan, (0-3), K O'Connor, (0-2), J O'Connor (0-1), B O'Leary (0-1), M Slattery (0-1).

6 July 2019 Round 1	Lixnaw	3-25 - 0-13	Ballyheigue	Austin Stack Park
	S Conway (3-11; 0-7f, 0-2 '65'), R Galvin (0-3), S McElligott (0-2), J Wallace (0-2), C Sheehy (0-2), J Griffin (0-2), J McKenna (0-1), R Heffernan (0-1), J Galvin (0-1).	Report	P Lucid (0-11; 5f, 1 '65'), M Leane (0-1 free), J Casey (0-1).

7 July 2019 Round 1	Causeway	0-20 - 0-11	Kilmoyley	Austin Stack Park
	B Barrett (0-7, 5f), C Harty (0-5), B Lyons (0-2), G Dooley (0-1), J Leahy (0-1), J Diggins (0-1), A Fealy (0-1).	Report	M O'Connor (0-9, 7f), D Collins (0-1), D Fitzell (0-1), M Flaherty (0-1).

7 July 2019 Round 1	Ballyduff	1-20 - 1-20 (aet)	Crotta O'Neill's	Austin Stack Park
	P Boyle (1-8, 5f), M Boyle (0-5), L Boyle (0-2), D O'Carroll (0-1), D Goulding (0-1), P O'Carroll (0-1), J Goulding (0-1), A O'Connor (0-1).	Report	S Nolan (0-14; 9f, 1 '65'), J Conway (1-3), R Nolan (0-1), P Quill (0-1), T Blonde McElligott 0-1.

19 July 2019 Round 1 replay	Ballyduff	0-10 - 1-16	Crotta O'Neill's	Austin Stack Park
	P Boyle 0-5, J Goulding 0-2, E Ross 0-1, M Boyle 0-1, A Boyle 0-1.		S Nolan 0-11, J Conway 0-4, Declan O'Donoghue 1-0, B Mahony 0-1.

=== Round 2A ===
27 July 2019 Round 2A	St Brendan's	1-18 - 2-15	Crotta O'Neill's	Austin Stack Park
	J Egan 0-8, N Driscoll 1-0, C Healy 0-2, T Hannafin 0-1, K Hannafin 0-1, S O'Halloran 0-1, K Fitzgerald 0-1, J Wallace 0-1, D Griffin 0-1, C Hussey 0-1, M Davis 0-1.		S Nolan 2-10, D Hunt 0-2, J Conway 0-2, B Mahony 0-1.

28 July 2019 Round 2A	Lixnaw	1-20 - 0-13	Causeway	Austin Stack Park
	S Conway 0-13, J Wallace 1-3, S McElligott 0-1, C Sheehy 0-1, J McKenna 0-1, J Buckley 0-1.		B Lyons 0-3, K Carmody 0-3, D Goggin 0-2, B Barrett 0-1, J Diggins 0-1, C Harty 0-1, G Dooley 0-1, P McGrath 0-1.

5 August 2019 Round 2A replay	St Brendan's	2-11 - 1-13	Crotta O'Neill's	Austin Stack Park
	C Hussey 2-1, J Egan 0-4, D Griffin 0-3, T Hannafin 0-2, T Moloney 0-1.		S Nolan 1-9, D Hunt 0-2, J Conway 0-2.

=== Round 2B ===
27 July 2019 Round 2B	Ballyduff	4-30 - 0-07	Ballyheigue	Austin Stack Park
	J Goulding 1-11, P Boyle 1-7, A Boyle 2-3, E Daly 0-3, E Ross 0-2, D Goulding 0-1, L Boyle 0-1, P O'Carroll 0-1, D O'Connor 0-1.		P Lucid 0-3, M Leane 0-1, D Walsh 0-1, G Galway 0-1, B O'Riordan 0-1.

28 July 2019 Round 2B	Abbeydorney	1-16 - 3-21	Kilmoyley	Austin Stack Park
	PJ Keane 0-10, A Healy 1-0, M O'Leary 0-3, K O'Connor 0-1, B Donovan 0-1, R Donovan 0-1.		M O'Connor 1-8, K McCarthy 2-0, J Brick 0-6, D Collins 0-4, B O'Sullivan 0-1, T Murnane 0-1, R Collins 0-1.

=== Quarter-finals ===
10 August 2019 Quarter-final	Causeway	0-19 - 0-08	Ballyduff	Austin Stack Park
	B Barrett 0-11, C Harty 0-2, D Goggin 0-2, M Murphy 0-2, B Murphy 0-2.		P Boyle 0-4, E Ross 0-3, J O'Sullivan 0-1.

10 August 2019 Quarter-final	Kilmoyley	1-19 - 1-11 (aet)	Crotta O'Neill's	Austin Stack Park
	M O'Connor 0-11, D Collins 1-1, M Flaherty 0-2, J Brick 0-2, P Godley 0-1, R Collins 0-1, B O'Sullivan 0-1.		S Nolan 1-10, R Nolan 0-1.

=== Semi-finals ===
17 August 2019 Semi-final	Causeway	1-16 - 0-13	St Brendan's	Austin Stack Park
	B Barrett 0-8, G Dooley 1-0, B Murphy 0-2, P McGrath 0-2, Joseph Diggins 0-2, C Harty 0-1, D Goggin 0-1.		J Egan 0-8, D Griffin 0-2, B O'Connor 0-1, C Healy 0-1, S o'Halloran 0-1.

17 August 2019 Semi-final	Lixnaw	0-15 - 0-12	Kilmoyley	Austin Stack Park
	S Conway 0-4, R Heffernan 0-3, R Galvin 0-2, J McKenna, J Wallace 0-1, C Sheehy 0-1, J Griffin 0-1, B McAuliffe 0-1.		M O'Connor 0-7, J Brick 0-2, B O'Sullivan 0-2, P O'Connor 0-1.

=== Final ===
25 August 2019 Final	Causeway	2-13 - 1-13	Lixnaw	Austin Stack Park
	C Harty 2-2; B Barrett 0-7 (4f, 2 '65); B Murphy 0-2; G Dooley, D Goggin 0-1 each.	Report	S Conway 1-12 (10f, 1-0 pen); M Conway 0-1.	Referee: M Sexton (Limerick)

== Championship statistics ==
=== Top scorers ===
Overall

Rank	Player	County	Tally	Total	Matches	Average
1	Shane Nolan	Crotta O'Neill's	5-44	59	5	11.80
2	Shane Conway	Lixnaw	4-40	52	4	13.00
3	Maurice O'Connor	Kilmoyley	1-35	38	4	9.50
4	Brandon Barrett	Causeway	0-34	34	5	6.80
5	Pádraig Boyle	Ballyduff	2-24	30	4	7.50
6	John Egan	St Brendan's	1-23	26	4	6.50
7	P. J. Keane	Abbeydorney	1-17	20	2	10.00
8	Colum Harty	Causeway	2-11	17	5	3.40
9	Jack Goulding	Lixnaw	1-14	17	3	5.66
10	Jordan Conway	Crotta O'Neill's	1-11	14	4	3.50
10	Philip Lucid	Ballyheigue	0-14	14	2	7.00

Single game

Rank	Player	Club	Tally	Total	Opposition
1	Shane Conway	Lixnaw	3-11	20	Ballyheigue
2	Shane Nolan	Crotta O'Neill's	2-16	16	St Brendan's
3	Shane Conway	Lixnaw	1-12	15	Causeway
4	Jack Goulding	Lixnaw	1-11	14	Ballyheigue
4	Shane Nolan	Crotta O'Neill's	0-14	14	Ballyduff
6	Shane Nolan	Crotta O'Neill's	1-10	13	Kilmoyley
6	Shane Conway	Lixnaw	0-13	13	Causeway
8	Shane Nolan	Crotta O'Neill's	1-09	12	St Brendan's
9	Pádraig Boyle	Ballyduff	1-08	11	Crotta O'Neill's
9	Maurice O'Connor	Kilmoyley	1-08	11	Abbeydorney
9	Philip Lucid	Ballyheigue	0-11	11	Lixnaw
9	Shane Nolan	Crotta O'Neill's	0-11	11	Ballyduff
9	Brandon Barrett	Causeway	0-11	11	Ballyduff
9	Maurice O'Connor	Kilmoyley	0-11	11	Crotta O'Neill's
