= 2014 All-Ireland Minor B Hurling Championship =

Irish Hurling Event

Details of the 2014 All-Ireland Minor B Hurling Championship.

== Overview ==
Kerry are the defending champions, having beaten Wicklow in the 2013 All-Ireland final. The championship began on 7 August 2014.

== Fixtures/results ==
=== Quarter-finals ===
7 August 2014 Quarter-final	Meath	0-14 - 2-7	Kildare	St. Loman's Park
	C Bird (0-5 fs), L Carey (0-2, 1 f), R Ryan (0-2), L Moran (0-1), J Payne (0-1), L Martyn (0-1), R Ryan (0-1), Alex Walsh (0-1).	Report	Eoin O'Heir (0-4 fs), Tadgh Forde (1-0), Niall Kenny (1-0), Conor Dowling (0-2), Odhran Loughran (0-1 f).	Referee: G McGrath (Dublin)

9 August 2014 Quarter-final	Armagh	1-10 - 5-14	Westmeath	Athletic Grounds
12:00

9 August 2014 Quarter-final	Wicklow	0-7 - 3-9	Kerry	Pearse Park
15:00	E Donoghue (0-4, 2f), P Doyle, T Mellon, C Doyle (0-1 each).	Report	J Buckley (0-7, 6fs), J Goulding, A Murphy, J Brick (1-0 each), B Lyons, F O’Sullivan (0-1 each).	Referee: S Cleere (Kilkenny)

9 August 2014 Quarter-final	Rscommon	2-25 - 2-22	Donegal	Athleague
15:00	D Glynn (0-16, seven frees), N Gately (2-2), J Brennan (0-3), D Keaveney (0-1), D Ryan (0-1), S Dunne (0-1), R Farrell (0-1).	Report	T Clare (0-7, all; frees), J Lochlainn (0-5, three frees, two ’65s), C Doherty (1-1), Stephen Doherty (1-1), E Lynch (0-3, two frees), Sam Doherty (0-1), E Drumond (0-1), O Rooney (0-1), M Carr (0-1), S Curran (0-1).	Referee: B Sweeney (Cavan)

=== Semi-final ===
16 August 2014 Semi-final	Meath	w/o - scr.	Westmeath	St. Loman's Park
14:00

16 August 2014 Semi-final	Roscommon	0-5 - 2-22	Kerry	MacDonagh Park
15:00	D Glynn (0-2), J Martin (0-1), B Fallon (0-1), J Brennan (0-1).	Report	B Barrett (1-5, 0-1f), J Buckley (0-4, 3f), J Brick (0-4), F Mackessy (1-0), F O'Sullivan (0-3), J Goulding (0-2), Jos Diggins (0-1), M Lynch (0-1), J Conway (0-1), Jas Diggins (0-1).	Referee: J O'Brien

=== Final ===
6 September 2014 Final	Meath	2-15 - 3-18	Kerry	MacDonagh Park
http://munster.gaa.ie/2014/09/06/electric-ireland-all-ireland-minor-b-hurling-championship-final-kerry-v-meath/	C Bird (0-12, 8fs, 1 65, 1 sideline), M Healy, G McGowan (1-0 each), J Wall (0-2, 1f), R Ryan (0-1).		B Barrett (1-7, 0-6fs), F O’Sullivan, J Conway (1-0 each), F Mackessy, J Buckley (one free) (0-3 each), J Goulding (0-2), J Diggins, J Brick, D O’Carroll (0-1 each).	Referee: D Hughes (Carlow)
