= 2015 Kerry Senior Hurling Championship =

Annual hurling competition season

- Dates: 17 July – 27 September 2015
- Teams: 8
- Sponsor: Garvey's SuperValu
- Champions: Kilmoyley (23rd title); Seán Maunsell (captain); John Meyler (manager)
- Runners-up: St Brendan's, Ardfert; Darren Delaney (captain); Pat O'Driscoll (manager)

Tournament statistics
- Matches played: 14
- Goals scored: 36 (2.57 per match)
- Points scored: 383 (27.36 per match)
- Top scorer(s): Daniel Collins (3-51)

The 2015 Kerry Senior Hurling Championship was the 114th staging of the Kerry Senior Hurling Championship since its establishment by the Kerry County Board in 1889. The championship began on 17 July 2015 and ended on 27 September 2015.

The championship was won by Kilmoyley who secured the title following a 3–15 to 1–13 defeat of St Brendan's, Ardfert in the final. This was their 23rd championship title and their first in six championship seasons.

Lixnaw were the defending champions, however, they were defeated at the semi-final stage.

== Results ==
=== Round 1 ===
17 July 2015 Round 1	Balluheigue	0-15 - 0-17	Lixnaw	Healy Park
19:00	P Lucid 0-10, D Casey 0-1, D Casey 0-1, M Dineen 0-1, D Walsh 0-1, P Carroll 0-1.		M Conway 0-7, J Flaherty 0-4, S Conway 0-3, E Galvin 0-1, J Griffin 0-1, C Sheehy 0-1.	Referee: C McAllister (Cork)

19 July 2015 Round 1	Crotta O'Neill's	1-17 - 1-17	Kilmoyley	Causeway Grounds
13:13	S Nolan 1-11, P Twomey 0-2, P Quille 0-2, J Twomey 0-1, I McCarthy 0-1.		S Maunsell 0-5, D Collins 0-5, A Royle 1-0, T Murnane 0-3, J Brick 0-2, R Collins 0-1, M O'Regan 0-1.	Referee: J Mullins

19 July 2015 Round 1	Abbeydorney	1-17 - 2-10	St Brendan's, Ardfert	Causeway Grounds
15:15	PJ Keane 0-9 (5f), E Egan 1-0, D Egan 0-2, B O’Leary 0-2, D O’Leary 0-2, K Dineen and I McCarthy 0-1		D Griffin 1-2, J Egan 0-5 (5f), T Hannafin 1-0, E Leen, E Corridon and K Orpin 0-1 each.	Referee: D Kirwan

19 July 2015 Round 1	Causeway	2-11 - 0-10	Ballyduff	Páirc Naomh Eirc
18:00	C Harty 2-1, P McGrath 0-6, M Delaney 0-2, A Fealy 0-1, J Fitzgerald 0-1.		P Boyle 0-5, E Ross 0-3, A Boyle 0-1, M Boyle 0-1.	Referee: C O'Regan

26 July 2015 Round 1 replay	Crotta O'Neill's	0-10 - 1-12 (aet)	Kilmoyley	Causeway Grounds
13:30	S Nolan 0-8, I McCarthy 0-1, P Twomey 0-1.		D Collins 1-11, A Royle 0-1.	Referee: C O'Regan

=== Round 2A ===
25 July 2015 Round 2A	Lixnaw	2-17 - 0-16	Causeway	Healy Park
19:00	M Conway 2-7, S Conway 0-4, C Sheehy 0-2, E Galvin 0-2, J Griffin 0-1.		P McGrath 0-5, M Delaney 0-3, C Harty 0-3, T Casey 0-2, E Fitzgerald 0-1, J Fitzgerald 0-1, A Fealy 0-1.	Referee: J Mullins

3 August 2015 Round 2A	Kilmoyley	2-10 - 0-06	Abbeydorney	Ballyduff Grounds
18:30	S Young 2-0, D Collins 0-6, R Collins 0-2, S Maunsell 0-1, J Brick 0-1.	Report	I McCarthy 0-3, R O'Donovan 0-1, PJ Keane 0-1, D Egan 0-1.	Referee: C McAllister

=== Round 2B ===
26 July 2015 Round 2B	Ballyheigue	0-09 - 0-10	St Brendan's, Ardfert	Causeway Sportsfield
15:15	P Lucid (0-7), D Casey (0-1), Tommy O’Connor (0-1).	Report	J Egan (0-7, T Hannafin (0-1), K Fitzgerald (0-1), K Skinner (0-1).	Referee: D Kirwan

4 August 2015 Round 2B	Crotta O'Neill's	1-17 - 2-20 (AET)	Ballyduff	Hermitage Park
18:30	S Nolan (1-10), J Conway (0-3), A O'Mahony (0-2), I McCarthy (0-1), P Twomey (0-1).	Report	B O'Sullivan (0-11), G O'Brien (1-2), M Boyle (0-2), E Ross (0-1), T Rourke (0-1), B O'Grady (0-1), G O'Grady (0-1), A Boyle (0-1).	Referee: J Mullins

=== Quarter-finals ===
16 August 2015 Quarter-final	Abbeydorney	3-09 - 1-17	Ballyduff	Hermitage Park
14:00	PJ Keane (2-2), M O'Leary (1-3), B Donovan (0-2), B O'Leary (0-1), D Egan (0-1).	Report	B O'Sullivan (0-11), G O'Brien (1-1), B O'Grady (0-3), M Boyle (0-1), A Boyle (0-1).	Referee: C McAllister

16 August 2015 Quarter-final	Causeway	1-8 - 4-16	St Brendan's, Ardfert	Páirc Naomh Eirc
18:30	P McGrath (0-5), C Harty (1-1), JM Dooley (0-1), K Carmody (0-1).	Report	J Egan (1-10), E Leen (1-1), J Wallace (1-0), K Skinner (0-3), D Dineen (0-1), D Griffin (0-1).	Referee: J Mullins

=== Semi-finals ===
29 August 2015 Semi-final	Lixnaw	1-12 - 2-15	St Brendan's, Ardfert	Healy Park
18:00	M Conway (0-9), S Conway (1-0), R Heffernan (0-2), J Flaherty (0-1).		J Egan (2-7), D Griffin (0-3), K Skinner (0-3), F Mackessey (0-2).	Referee: C McAllister

30 August 2015 Semi-final	Kilmoyley	2-24 - 2-12	Ballyduff	Healy Park
18:00	D Collins 0-9, A Royle 1-3, M O'Connor 1-1, M O'Regan 0-3, D Fitzell 0-2, S Maunsell 0-2, T Murnane 0-1, J McCarthy 0-1, J Brick 0-1, R Collins 0-1.		B O'Sullivan 0-8, A Boyle 1-2, B O'Grady 0-1, M Boyle 0-1.	Referee: J Mullins

=== Final ===
27 September 2015 Final	St Brendan's, Ardfert	1-13 - 3-15	Kilmoyley	Healy Park
	J Egan 0-8 (0-6 frees), D Wallace 1-0 E Leen 0-2, D Dineen 0-2 (s/l), K Hannafin 0- 1	Report	D Collins 2-10 (1-9 frees), M Regan 1-0, S Maunsell and P O’Connor 0-2each, J McCarthy 0-1	Referee: J Mullins

== Championship statistics ==
=== Top scorers ===
Overall

Rank	Player	County	Tally	Total	Matches	Average
1	Daniel Collins	Kilmoyley	3-41	50	5	10.00
2	John Egan	St Brendan's	3-37	46	5	9.20
3	Shane Nolan	Crotta O'Neill's	2-29	35	3	11.66
4	Bobby O'Sullivan	Ballyduff	0-30	30	4	7.50
5	Michael Conway	Lixnaw	2-23	29	3	9.66
6	P. J. Keane	Abbeydorney	2-12	18	3	6.00
7	Philip Lucid	Ballyheigue	0-17	17	2	8.50
8	Paul McGrath	Causeway	0-16	16	3	5.33
9	Colum Harty	Causeway	3-05	14	3	4.66
10	Adrian Royle	Kilmoyley	1-07	10	5	2.00
10	Shane Conway	Lixnaw	1-07	10	3	3.33
10	Seán Maunsell	Kilmoyley	0-10	10	5	2.00

Single game

Rank	Player	Club	Tally	Total	Opposition
1	Daniel Collins	Kilmoyley	2-10	16	St Brendan's
2	Shane Nolan	Crotta O'Neill's	1-11	14	Kilmoyley
2	Daniel Collins	Kilmoyley	1-11	14	Crotta O'Neill's
4	Michael Conway	Lixnaw	2-07	13	Causeway
4	John Egan	St Brendan's	2-07	13	Lixnaw
4	John Egan	St Brendan's	1-10	13	Causeway
4	Shane Nolan	Crotta O'Neill's	1-10	13	Ballyduff
8	Bobby O'Sullivan	Ballyduff	0-11	11	Crotta O'Neill's
8	Bobby O'Sullivan	Ballyduff	0-11	11	Abbeydorney
10	Philip Lucid	Ballyheigue	0-10	10	Lixnaw

=== Miscellaneous ===
- Kilmoyley win the title for the first time in seven seasons.
- The final is played at Healy Park in Abbeydorney due to the refurbishment of Austin Stack Park.
