= Kilmoyley =

Village in County Kerry, Ireland

Kilmoyly Cill Mhaoile
- Village
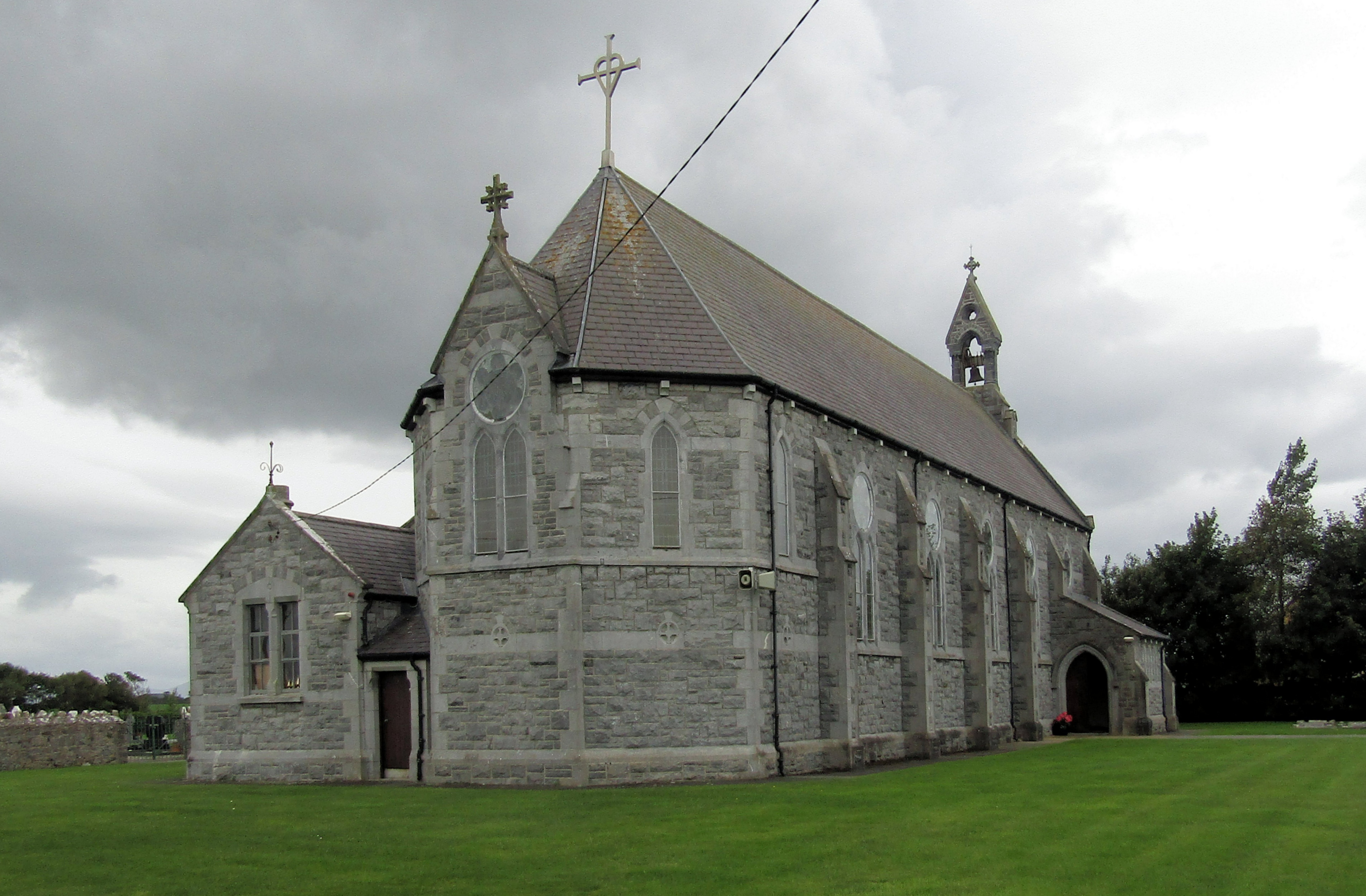
- Sacred Heart Church

- Location in Ireland
- Coordinates: 52°22′09″N 9°46′20″W
- Country: Ireland
- Province: Munster
- County: County Kerry
- Time zone: UTC+0 (WET)
  - Summer (DST): UTC-1 (IST (WEST))
- Irish Grid Reference: Q793256

Kilmoyley, officially Kilmoyly (Irish: Cill Mhaoile), is a village in County Kerry, Ireland. It is 6 km southeast of Ballyheigue, and 10 km north of Tralee. The village is in a civil parish of the same name.

== Amenities ==
Prior to more recent development, the original settlement in the area comprised two or three dwellings and the local Roman Catholic church. This church, the Church of the Sacred Heart, was built in 1873.

There is a national school in Kilmoyley called Scoil Naomh Eirc. In Kilmoyley there is also a lough known as Lerrig Lough.

== See also ==
- List of towns and villages in the Republic of Ireland
