= All-Ireland Minor B Hurling Championship =

- Region: Ireland (GAA)
- Number of teams: 7
- Current champions: Meath
- Website: Official website

The GAA Hurling All-Ireland Minor B Championship is an annual hurling competition organised by the Gaelic Athletic Association for the youngest competitors (under-18) in Ireland. It is sponsored by the Electricity Supply Board and therefore, officially known as the ESB GAA Hurling All-Ireland Minor B Championship.

The series of games is played in August, with the All-Ireland final being played on the last Sunday of the month. The championship has always been played on a straight knockout basis, open to teams from each of the four provinces of Ireland. Teams that are deemed ineligible or "too weak" for the All-Ireland Minor Hurling Championship participate in the B championship.

The championship currently consists of several stages, beginning with quarter-finals and culminating in a final.

Seven teams currently participate in the championship.

== List of All-Ireland finals ==
Year	Winners	Score	Runners-up	Score	Venue
1997	Kerry	4-13	Armagh	1-11	
1998	Carlow	1-09	Westmeath	0-7	
1999	Westmeath	2-12	Wicklow	2-06	
2000	Kerry	4-12	Meath	2-13	Semple Stadium
2001	Kerry	4-12	Carlow	3-07	Semple Stadium
2002	Carlow	2-07	Meath	1-07	Seán Treacy Park
2003	Carlow	2-05	Meath	0-10	Conneff Park
2004	Carlow	3-09	Kildare	1-08	
2005	Carlow	4-16	Wicklow	0-04	
2006	Kerry	1-09	Westmeath	0-10	O'Connor Park
2007	Meath	3-19	Kildare	1-07	O'Connor Park
2008	Kildare	2-12	Westmeath	1-09	Semple Stadium
2009	Kerry	0-21	Westmeath	1-13	McDonagh Park
2010	Westmeath	2-12	Kildare	1-12	Páirc Tailteann
2011	Meath	2-12	Roscommon	0-10	Páirc Mhaolbhuí
2012	Kerry	4-17	Roscommon	1-07	Gaelic Grounds
2013	Kerry	1-19	Meath	3-09	Nenagh
2014	Kerry	3-18	Meath	2-15	Nenagh
2015	Kerry	6-17	Roscommon	1-08	Gaelic Grounds
2016	Kerry	4-17	Meath	3-11	Semple Stadium
2017	Meath	3-20	Down	2-19	St Tiernach's Park, Clones
