= 2000 Kerry Senior Hurling Championship =

- Dates: 8 July – 19 November 2000
- Teams: 10
- Sponsor: AIB
- Champions: Ballyheigue (5th title); Mike Slattery (captain); John Lucid (manager)
- Runners-up: Ballyduff; Kenneth Boyle (captain); Jimmy O'Sullivan (manager)

Tournament statistics
- Matches played: 10
- Goals scored: 23 (2.3 per match)
- Points scored: 181 (18.1 per match)
- Top scorer(s): Mike Hennessy (5-15)

The 2000 Kerry Senior Hurling Championship was the 99th staging of the Kerry Senior Hurling Championship since its establishment by the Kerry County Board in 1889. The championship draw was made on 9 May 2000. The championship ran from 8 July to 19 November 2000.

Lixnaw entered the championship as the defending champions, however, they were beaten by Crotta O'Neill's in a quarter-final replay.

The final was played on 19 November 2000 at Austin Stack Park in Tralee, between Ballyheigue and Ballyduff, in what was their third meeting in the final overall and a first final meeting in four years. Ballyheigue won the match by 1–06 to 0–08 to claim their fifth championship title overall and a first title in three years. It remains their last championship victory.

Ballyduff's Mike Hennessy was the championship's top scorer with 5–15.

== Results ==
=== Preliminary round ===
8 July 2000 Preliminary round	Ballyduff	4-17 - 1-08	Kenmare/St Pat's	Austin Stack Park
	M Hennessy 4-10, A Boyle 0-2, A O'Grady 0-1, D O'Connor 0-1, P O'Rourke 0-1, L Boyle 0-1, B O'Sullivan 0-1.		M Flynn 0-5, J Dunphy 1-0, TP O'Connor 0-1, S O'Shea 0-1, P Randles 0-1.

29 July 2000 Preliminary round	Austin Stacks	0-01 - 3-30	Kilmoyley	Austin Stack Park
	D O'Regan 0-1.		M Regan 1-8, C Harris 0-8, O Diggins 1-3, O Young 0-5, R Gentleman 1-0, C Walsh 0-3, S Regan 0-1, S Fitzgerald 0-1, S Brick 0-1.

=== Quarter-finals ===
31 August 2000 Quarter-final	St Brendan's	1-06 - 1-12	Causeway	Austin Stack Park
	L O'Connor 1-0, G Healy 0-2, M Casey 0-1, D Clifford 0-1, S Flaherty 0-1, J O'Halloran 0-1.		G Harty 0-5, L Harty 1-1, JM Dooley 0-3, H McEnery 0-1, T Burke 0-1, S Sheehan 0-1.

18 August 2000 Quarter-final	Ballyduff	1-12 - 1-06	Abbeydorney	Austin Stack Park
	M Hennessy 1-4, L Boyle 0-3, B O'Sullivan 0-2, G O'Brien 0-1, P O'Rourke 0-1, A Boyle 0-1.		D Ryall 1-0, K Hanafin 0-2, B O'Donovan 0-2, T Maunsell 0-1, B Sheehan 0-1.

25 August 2000 Quarter-final	Ballyheigue	1-11 - 1-09	Kilmoyley	Austin Stack Park
	M Slattery 0-6, G Frehill 1-0, B O'Sullivan 0-2, E Flahive 0-1, A Murphy 0-1, G Lucid 0-1.		O Diggins 0-5, D Young 1-0, S Brick 0-3, C Harris 0-1.

9 September 2000 Quarter-final	Crotta O'Neill's	0-08 - 1-05	Lixnaw	Austin Stack Park
	S Twomey 0-4, B O'Mahony 0-3, F O'Sullivan 0-1.		R Thornton 1-0, M Conway 0-2, P O'Connell 0-1, F Fitzmaurice 0-1, K Dowling 0-1.

15 October 2000 Quarter-final replay	Crotta O'Neill's	2-08 - 0-10	Lixnaw	J. P. O'Sullivan Park
	J Edwards 2-1, S Twomey 0-4, K Galvin 0-1, P McGrath 0-1, J O'Sullivan 0-1.		M Conway 0-2, P O'Connell 0-2, J Maher 0-2, F Fitzmaurice 0-1, P Cronin 0-1, K Dowling 0-1, J McCarthy 0-1.

=== Semi-finals ===
16 September 2000 Semi-final	Ballyheigue	4-09 - 1-07	Causeway	Austin Stack Park
	G Lucid 2-0, P O'Mahony 1-2, TB O'Connor 1-0, M Slattery 0-3, B O'Sullivan 0-2, G O'Sullivan 0-1, K O'Sullivan 0-1.		JM Dooley 1-4, T Burke 0-1, TJ Canty 0-1, S Sheehan 0-1.

5 November 2000 Semi-final	Ballyduff	0-05 - 0-03	Crotta O'Neill's	Austin Stack Park
	B O'Sullivan 0-4, R O'Connor 0-1.		B O'Mahony 0-1, P McGrath 0-1, J Edwards 0-1.

=== Final ===
19 November 2000 Final	Ballyheigue	1-06 - 0-08	Ballyduff	Austin Stack Park
	M Slattery 1-3, B O'Sullivan 0-1, K O'Sullivan 0-1, E Flahive 0-1.		B O'Sullivan 0-3, A Boyle 0-3, J Bunyan 0-1, M Hennessy 0-1.

== Championship statistics ==
=== Top scorers ===
Overall

Rank	Player	County	Tally	Total	Matches	Average
1	Mike Hennessy	Ballyduff	5-15	30	4	7.50
2	Mike Slattery	Ballyheigue	1-12	15	3	5.00
3	Micheál Regan	Kilmoyley	1-08	11	2	5.50
3	Ollie Diggins	Kilmoyley	1-08	11	2	5.50
5	John Mike Dooley	Causeway	1-07	10	2	5.00
5	Bobby O'Sullivan	Ballyduff	0-10	10	4	2.50

Single game

Rank	Player	Club	Tally	Total	Opposition
1	Mike Hennessy	Ballyduff	4-10	22	Kenmare/St Pat's
2	Micheál Regan	Kilmoyley	1-08	11	AUstin Stacks
3	John Edwards	Crotta O'Neill's	2-01	7	Lixnaw
3	Mike Hennessy	Ballyduff	1-04	7	Abbeydorney
3	John Mike Dooley	Causeway	1-04	7	Ballyheigue
6	Colin Harris	Kilmoyley	0-08	8	Austin Stacks
7	Ger Lucid	Ballyheigue	2-00	6	Causeway
7	Ollie Diggins	Kilmoyley	1-03	6	Austin Stacks
7	Mike Slattery	Ballyheigue	1-03	6	Ballyduff
7	Mike Slattery	Ballyheigue	0-06	6	Kilmoyley
