= Kerry Intermediate Hurling Championship =

- Irish: Craobh Iomána Idirmhéanach Chiarraí
- Code: Hurling
- Founded: 1971
- Region: Kerry (GAA)
- Trophy: Corn Antóin Ó Murchú
- No. of teams: 7
- Title holders: Dr Crokes (4th title)
- First winner: Banna
- Most titles: Kilgarvan (12 titles)
- Sponsors: Kerry Petroleum
- Official website: https://www.kerrygaa.ie/

The Kerry Intermediate Hurling Championship is an annual hurling competition contested by mid-tier Kerry GAA clubs.

The Kerry Intermediate Hurling Championship trophy commemorates the late Tony Murphy (1935-2005), a former Kerry and Kenmare Shamrocks hurler and a member of the 1961 All-Ireland Junior Hurling Championship winning team.

Extra-time can be used to determine the winners of games.

Dr Crokes are the title holders, defeating St Brendan's in the 2026 final.

== History ==
The winners play in the Munster Junior Club Hurling Championship and if successful there, can represent the province in the All-Ireland Junior Club Hurling Championship. Unlike in other counties, the winning team is not always automatically promoted to the senior grade after winning. Since Kerry has very few hurling clubs, many of the competing teams are second teams of clubs competing in the Kerry Senior Hurling Championship.

== Format ==
=== Group stage ===
Clubs are drawn into 3 groups. With currently 10 teams. 1 group of 4 and 2 groups of 3 are formed. Over the course of the group stage, each team plays once against the others in the group, resulting in each team being guaranteed two group games. Two points are awarded for a win, one for a draw and zero for a loss. The teams are ranked in the group stage table by points gained, then scoring difference and then their head-to-head record. The 1st placed team in the group of 4 and one of the groups of 3 qualify directly to the semi-finals. The remaining group winner and the 3 2nd placed teams face in the quarter-final.

=== Knockout stage ===
Quarter-finals: A group winner of a group with 3 teams and the 2nd placed teams face each other with the winner qualifying for the semi-finals

Semi-finals: The remaining 2 group winners face the winner of the quarter-finals. The two winners from these two games advance to the final.

Final: The two semi-final winners contest the final. The winning team are declared champions and are promoted to the Kerry Senior Hurling Championship.

=== Qualification ===
At the end of the championship, the winning club qualify to the subsequent Munster Junior Club Hurling Championship.

== Teams ==
=== 2026 Teams ===
The 9 teams competing in the 2026 Kerry Intermediate Hurling Championship are:

Team	Location	Colours	Division	Position in 2026	In championship since	Championship titles	Last championship title
Abbeydorney	Abbeydorney	Black and amber	North Kerry		—	0	—
Ballyheigue	Ballyheigue	Orange and black	North Kerry		—	1	1975
Dr Crokes	Killarney	Black and amber	South Kerry	Champions	2025	4	2026
Kenmare Shamrocks	Kenmare	Black and red	South Kerry		—	7	2025
Kilgarvan	Kilgarvan	Red and white	South Kerry		—	12	2024
Kilmoyley	Kilmoyley	Green and gold	North Kerry		2025	9	2015
Ladys Walk	Ballyduff	Green and white	North Kerry		2025	5	2008
Lixnaw	Lixnaw	Green and gold	North Kerry		—	2	1974
Rathmore	Rathmore	Red and white	East Kerry	Not played	2026	0	—
St Brendan's	Ardfert	Blue and white	North Kerry	Runners-up	—	7	2017

== Roll of honour ==
=== By club ===
#	Team	Titles	Runners-Up	Championships won	Championships runner-up
1	Kilgarvan	12	8	1972, 1981, 1982, 1984, 2006, 2007, 2009, 2010, 2018, 2019, 2022, 2024	1971, 1977, 1980, 2001, 2002, 2005, 2017, 2021
2	Kilmoyley	9	7	1985, 1986, 1987, 1988, 1992, 1994, 2003, 2011, 2015	1979, 1983, 1989, 1997, 2006, 2013, 2016
3	St Brendan's	7	9	1978, 1979, 1989, 1991, 1995, 1998, 2017	1973, 1974, 1975, 1987, 1992, 2022, 2023, 2024, 2026
3	Kenmare Shamrocks	7	4	1980, 2000, 2004, 2005, 2012, 2014, 2025	2008, 2009, 2010, 2019
5	Ladys Walk	5	9	1976, 1996, 1997, 2002, 2008	1982, 1993, 1998, 1999, 2000, 2007, 2011, 2012, 2025
6	Causeway	4	7	1977, 2013, 2016, 2021	1976, 1978, 1981, 1994, 1996, 2003, 2018
6	Dr Crokes	4	5	1999, 2001, 2020, 2026	1991, 1995, 2004, 2014, 2015
8	Lixnaw	2	1	1973, 1974	1972
8	St Patrick's East Kerry	2	1	1983, 1990	1986
10	Banna	1	0	1971	—
10	Ballyheigue	1	2	1975	1984, 1988
10	St. Mary’s	1	0	1993	—
10	Tralee Parnells	1	1	2023	2020
14	Abbeydorney	0	1	—	1985
14	Kerins O'Rahilly's	0	1	—	1990

=== By division ===
Division	Titles	Runners-Up	Total
North Kerry	29	36	65
South Kerry	27	20	47

== List of finals ==
Year	Winners		Runners-up		Final Date	Final Location
Year	Club	Score	Club	Score	Final Date	Final Location
2026	Dr Crokes	4-15 aet	St Brendan's	2-15 aet	30/07/2026	Fitzgerald Stadium, Killarney
2025	Kenmare Shamrocks	1–12	Ladys Walk	1–10	22/07/2025	Austin Stack Park, Tralee
2024	Kilgarvan	5-11	St Brendan's	1-09	31/7/2024	Fitzgerald Stadium, Killarney
2023	Tralee Parnells	0-19	St Brendan's	1-06	26/7/2023	Austin Stack Park, Tralee
2022	Kilgarvan	3-13	St Brendan's	0-11	3/8/2022	Fitzgerald Stadium, Killarney
2021	Causeway	3-08	Kilgarvan	1-09	3/10/2021	Fitzgerald Stadium, Killarney
2020	Dr Crokes	2-14	Tralee Parnells	0-14	20/9/2020	Austin Stack Park, Tralee
2019	Kilgarvan	1-18	Kenmare Shamrocks	1-12	24/8/2019	Lewis Road, Killarney
2018	Kilgarvan	1-19	Causeway	1-13	18/8/2018	Lewis Road, Killarney
2017	St Brendan's	5-17	Kilgarvan	2-15	9/9/2017	Lewis Road, Killarney
2016	Causeway	1-11	Kilmoyley	1-08	7/8/2016	Austin Stack Park, Tralee
2015	Kilmoyley	2-14	Dr Crokes	1-13	18/10/2015	Abbeydorney
2014	Kenmare Shamrocks	0-25	Dr Crokes	1-05	28/9/2015	Austin Stack Park, Tralee
2013	Causeway	2-13	Kilmoyley	1-11	13/10/2013	Austin Stack Park, Tralee
2012	Kenmare Shamrocks	2-15	Ladys Walk	1-05	13/7/2012	Fitzgerald Stadium, Killarney
2011	Kilmoyley	1-06	Ladys Walk	0-08	28/7/2011	Austin Stack Park, Tralee
2010	Kilgarvan	1-16	Kenmare Shamrocks	0-13	22/8/2010	Kilgarvan
2009	Kilgarvan	3-13 aet	Kenmare Shamrocks	1-16 aet	18/10/2009	Fr Breen Park, Kenmare
2008	Ladys Walk	1-12	Kenmare Shamrocks	1-08	17/9/2008	Austin Stack Park, Tralee
2007	Kilgarvan	2-15	Ladys Walk	1-13	13/10/2007	Fitzgerald Stadium, Killarney
2006	Kilgarvan	1-16	Kilmoyley	1-06	10/9/2006	Austin Stack Park, Tralee
2005	Kenmare Shamrocks	1-12	Kilgarvan	1-07	2/10/2005	Austin Stack Park, Tralee
2004	Kenmare Shamrocks	2-12	Dr Crokes	1-07	6/11/2004	Fr Breen Park, Kenmare
2003	Kilmoyley	3-13	Causeway	2-03	21/9/2003	Austin Stack Park, Tralee
2002	Ladys Walk	2-13	Kilgarvan	3-05	29/09/2002	Austin Stack Park, Tralee
2001	Dr Crokes	2-10	Kilgarvan	0-11	29/09/2001	Fitzgerald Stadium, Killarney
2000	Kenmare Shamrocks	1-10	Ladys Walk	3-01	14/10/2000	Fitzgerald Stadium, Killarney
1999	Dr Crokes	1-04	Ladys Walk	0-06	30/10/1999	Ballyheigue
1998	St Brendan's	3-06	Ladys Walk	0-09	26/10/1998	Austin Stack Park, Tralee
1997	Ladys Walk	4-10	Kilmoyley	1-05	5/10/1997	Ballyheigue
1996	Ladys Walk	2-17 aet	Causeway	2-10 aet	22/9/1996	Ballyheigue
1995	St Brendan's	1-09	Dr Crokes	1-05	8/10/1995	Farranfore
1994	Kilmoyley	2-08	Causeway	2-03	6/11/1994	Ballyheigue
1993	St. Mary’s	1-07	Ladys Walk	0-08	20/11/1993	Austin Stack Park, Tralee
1992	Kilmoyley	1-07	St Brendan's	0-01	22/11/1992	Ballyheigue
1991	St Brendan's	1-15	Dr Crokes	4-03	28/9/1991	Farranfore
1990	St Patrick's East Kerry	4-10	Kerins O'Rahillys	0-07	7/10/1990	Beaufort
1989	St Brendan's	2-04	Kilmoyley	0-01	15/10/1989	Causeway
1988	Kilmoyley	3-05	Ballyheigue	1-06	9/10/1988	Ardfert
1987	Kilmoyley	3-06	St Brendan's	1-04	15/11/1987	Ballyheigue
1986	Kilmoyley	1-11	St Patrick's East Kerry	3-04	12/10/1986	Austin Stack Park, Tralee
1985	Kilmoyley	4-05	Abbeydorney	1-01	1/12/1985	Ballyheigue
1984	Kilgarvan	3-07	Ballyheigue	0-04	9/9/1984	Austin Stack Park, Tralee
1983	St Patrick's East Kerry	2-10	Kilmoyley	1-02	6/11/1983	Milltown
1982	Kilgarvan	2-08	Ladys Walk	2-06	24/10/1982	Austin Stack Park, Tralee
1981	Kilgarvan	5-12	Causeway	2-02	4/10/1981	Fitzgerald Stadium, Killarney
1980	Kenmare Shamrocks	3-11	Kilgarvan	1-05	11/7/1980	Fr Breen Park, Kenmare
1979	St Brendan's	bt.	Kilmoyley		2/12/1979	Ardfert
1978	St Brendan's	3-05	Causeway	1-05	17/09/1978	Austin Stack Park, Tralee
1977	Causeway	2-10	Kilgarvan	0-06	11/9/1977	Austin Stack Park, Tralee
1976	Ladys Walk	4-12	Causeway	3-01	12/9/1976	Austin Stack Park, Tralee
1975	Ballyheigue	bt.	St Brendan's		14/9/1975	Austin Stack Park, Tralee
1974	Lixnaw	4-10	St Brendan's	1-01	22/9/1974	Austin Stack Park, Tralee
1973	Lixnaw	4-05	St Brendan's	0-01	18/11/1973	Austin Stack Park, Tralee
1972	Kilgarvan	5-06	Lixnaw	4-05	08/10/1972	Austin Stack Park, Tralee
1971	Banna	4-03	Kilgarvan	2-04	28/11/1971	Fitzgerald Stadium, Killarney

== Team records and statistics ==
=== By decade ===
The most successful team of each decade, judged by number of Kerry Intermediate Hurling Championship titles, is as follows:

- 1970s: 2 for Lixnaw (1973, 1974) and St Brendan's (1978, 1979)
- 1980s: 4 for Kilmoyley (1985, 1986, 1987, 1988)
- 1990s: 3 for St Brendan's (1991, 1995, 1998)
- 2000s: 3 for Kenmare Shamrocks (2000, 2004, 2005) and Kilgarvan (2006, 2007, 2009)
- 2010s: 3 for Kilgarvan (2010, 2018, 2019)
- 2020s: 2 for Kilgarvan (2022, 2024) and Dr Crokes (2020, 2026)

== See also ==
- Kerry Senior Hurling Championship
- Kerry Junior Hurling Championship
- Kerry Under 21 Hurling Championship
- Kerry Minor Hurling Championship
- Munster Junior Club Hurling Championship
