= D. J. Leahy =

Irish hurler

DJ Leahy
Personal information
- Born: Causeway, County Kerry

Sport
- Sport: Hurling
- Position: Forward
Club
- Years: Club
- Causeway
Club titles
- Kerry titles: 5
Inter-county
- Years: County
- Kerry
Inter-county titles
- Munster titles: 0
- All-Irelands: 0

D. J. Leahy was a hurler from County Kerry. He Played with the Kerry county and Causeway teams along with his brother Maurice. He scored a goal from a long-range free to give Kerry the impetus to drive on and win there 1993 Munster Senior Hurling Championship win over Waterford. He Won 5 County Championships with Causeway in 1979, 1980, 1981, 1982, 1987. He also won a Railway Cup with Munster in 1985. He won All Ireland B titles in 1983 and 1985 with Kerry.
