= Bryan Murphy (hurler) =

Irish hurler (born 1992)

Personal information
- Native name: Briain Ó Murchú (Irish)
- Born: 1992 (age 33–34) Causeway, County Kerry, Ireland
- Occupation: Garda Síochána

Sport
- Sport: Hurling
- Position: Full-back
Clubs
- Years: Club
- Causeway; Sarsfields
Club titles
- Kerry titles: 1
- Munster titles: 1
College
- Years: College
- Garda College
Inter-county
- Years: County
- 2011-2022: Kerry

Bryan Murphy (born 1992) is an Irish hurler who plays as a left wing-back for the Kerry senior team.

Born in Causeway, County Kerry, Murphy first played competitive hurling during his schooling at Causeway Comprehensive School. He arrived on the inter-county scene at the age of seventeen when he first linked up with the Kerry minor team before later joining the under-21 side. He made his senior debut during the 2011 league for Kerry seniors. Murphy quickly became a regular member of the starting fifteen and has won one Christy Ring Cup medal.

At club level Murphy has played with Causeway and Sarsfields in Cork and had won County titles with both.

== Honours ==
=== Team ===
Kerry

- Christy Ring Cup (2): 2011 (sub), 2015
- National League (Division 2A) (1): 2015
- All-Ireland Under 21 B Hurling Championship (2): 2011, 2013
- All-Ireland Minor B Hurling Championship (1): 2009

Causeway

- Kerry Senior Hurling Championship (1) 2019
- Kerry Under-21 Hurling Championship (1) 2014

Sarsfields

- Cork Premier Senior Hurling Championship (1) 2023
- Munster Senior Club Hurling Championship (1): 2024
