= 1999 Kerry Senior Hurling Championship =

- Dates: 19 June – 10 October 1999
- Teams: 11
- Sponsor: AIB
- Champions: Lixnaw (5th title); Trevor McKenna (captain); Jerry Molyneaux (manager)
- Runners-up: Crotta O'Neill's; Denis Mahony (captain); Tom Kenny (manager)

Tournament statistics
- Matches played: 13
- Goals scored: 53 (4.08 per match)
- Points scored: 235 (18.08 per match)
- Top scorer(s): John Mike Dooley (5-14)

The 1999 Kerry Senior Hurling Championship was the 98th staging of the Kerry Senior Hurling Championship since its establishment by the Kerry County Board in 1889. The championship draw took place on 20 April 1999. The championship ran from 19 June to 10 October 1999.

Causeway entered the championship as the defending champions, however, they were beaten by Crotta O'Neill's in the semi-finals.

The final, a replay, was played on 10 October 1999 at Austin Stack Park in Tralee, between Lixnaw and Crotta O'Neill's, in what was their second meeting in the final overall and a first final meeting in 14 years. Lixnaw won the match by 0–09 to 1–05 to claim their fifth championship title overall and a first title in 14 years.

Causeway's John Mike Dooley was the championship's top scorer with 5-14.

== Results ==
=== Preliminary round ===
19 June 1999 Preliminary round	Kenmare	1-09 - 1-09	St Pat's	FitzGerald Stadium
	TP O'Connor 1-1, S O'Regan 0-4, S O'Shea 0-3, P Randles 0-1.		G McGuinness 1-2, M Flynn 0-3, S O'Shea 0-1, G O'Sullivan 0-1, T Hourigan 0-1, L Moloney 0-1.

19 June 1999 Preliminary round	Austin Stacks	0-02 - 7-18	Abbeydorney	Austin Stack Park
	P Teehan 0-1, J O'Regan 0-1.		L o'Sullivan 1-7, B Sheehan 2-1, D Nolan 1-3, T Maunsell 1-3, I McCarthy 1-1, G Maunsell 1-0, T O'Halloran 0-3.

23 July 1999 Preliminary round	Kilmoyley	2-06 - 2-09	Lixnaw	Austin Stack Park
	D Young 2-0, S Brick 0-2, I Brick 0-2, M Regan 0-1, C Walsh 0-1.		P O'Connell 0-7, M Kelliher 2-0, J Maher 0-1, D McCarthy 0-1.

24 July 1999 Preliminary round replay	Kenmare	2-17 - 1-08	St Pat's	Fr Breen Park
	S O'Regan 0-7, TP O'Connor 0-4, P O'Shea 1-0, D Clifford 1-0, S O'Shea 0-2, E Hussey 0-2, L Lynch 0-1, P Randles 0-1.		P Landers 1-1, M Flynn 0-4, J Dunphy 0-1, J Kennedy 0-1, T McGuinness 0-1.

=== Quarter-finals ===
6 August 1999 Quarter-final	Crotta O'Neill's	3-11 - 3-08	Ballyheigue	Austin Stack Park
	M Carlton 1-7, D Mahony 1-0, P McGrath 1-0, J O'Sullivan 0-2, B O'Mahony 0-2.		G O'Sullivan 2-1, B O'Sullivan 1-3, WJ Leen 0-2, K O'Sullivan 0-1, E Flahive 0-1.

7 August 1999 Quarter-final	Causeway	3-09 - 2-12	Abbeydorney	Austin Stack Park
	JM Dooley 1-5, H McEnery 1-1, JJ Canty 1-0, S Sheehan 0-2, T Burke 0-1.		T Maunsell 1-4, K Hannafin 1-2, L O'Sullivan 0-3, I Maunsell 0-1, T O'Connell 0-1, A Healy 0-1.

8 August 1999 Quarter-final	Ballyduff	1-06 - 1-08	Lixnaw	Austin Stack Park
	B O'Sullivan 0-5, J Carroll 1-0, F Whelan 0-1.		P O'Connell 0-5, P Galvin 1-0, P Cronin 0-1, D McCarthy 0-1, M Conway 0-1.

8 August 1999 Quarter-final	Kenmare	0-11 - 3-10	St Brendan's	Austin Stack Park
	L Lynch 0-4, S McIntyre 0-4, S O'Shea 0-2, J Wharton 0-1.		J Brennan 3-0, D Leen 0-4, P Healy 0-3, D Clifford 0-2, T O'Halloran 0-1.

20 August 1999 Quarter-final replay	Causeway	3-08 - 0-09	Abbeydorney	Austin Stack Park
	JM Dooley 2-2, L Harty 1-1, S Sheehan 0-2, S Harty 0-1, C Harty 0-1, G Barrett 0-1.		I Maunsell 0-3, T O'Connell 0-2, T Maunsell 0-1, D Nolan 0-1, K Hannafin 0-1, L McCarthy 0-1.

=== Semi-finals ===
28 August 1999 Semi-final	Lixnaw	5-06 - 3-03	St Brendan's	Austin Stack Park
	J Maher 2-2, P O'Connell 1-1, M Conway 1-1, J McCarthy 1-0, M Kelleher 0-1, P Galvin 0-1.		P Healy 2-1, F Fitzgerald 1-0, E Corridan 0-1, D Leen 0-1.

19 September 1999 Semi-final	Crotta O'Neill's	3-13 - 2-13	Causeway	Austin Stack Park
	M Carlton 0-7, B O'Mahony 2-1, P McGrath 1-0, S Twomey 0-3, P Cronin 0-1, J O'Sullivan 0-1.		JM Dooley 2-7, S Sheehan 0-3, L Harty 0-2, C Harty 0-1.

=== Final ===
3 October 1999 Final	Lixnaw	2-08 - 2-08	Crotta O'Neill's	Austin Stack Park
	M Conway 1-2, P O'Connell 1-0, P Cronin 0-3, P Galvin 0-2, E Fitzmaurice 0-1.		J Edwards 2-0, M Carleton 0-4, S Twomey 0-2, B O'Mahony 0-1, D Mahony 0-1.

=== Final replay ===
10 October 1999 Final replay	Lixnaw	0-09 - 1-05	Crotta O'Neill's	Austin Stack Park
	P O'Connell 0-3, M Conway 0-3, P Cronin 0-2, P Galvin 0-1.		M Carlton 1-2, S Twomey 0-2, B O'Mahony 0-1.

== Championship statistics ==
=== Top scorers ===
Overall

Rank	Player	County	Tally	Total	Matches	Average
1	John Mike Dooley	Causeway	5-14	29	3	9.66
2	Michael Carlton	Crotta O'Neill's	2-20	26	4	6.50
3	Pat O'Connell	Lixnaw	2-16	22	5	4.40
4	Tony Maunsell	Abbeydorney	2-08	14	3	4.66
5	Mike Conway	Lixnaw	2-07	13	5	2.60
5	Liam O'Sullivan	Abbeydorney	1-10	13	3	4.33

Single game

Rank	Player	Club	Tally	Total	Opposition
1	John Mike Dooley	Causeway	2-07	13	Crotta O'Neill's
2	Liam O'Sullivan	Abbeydorney	1-07	10	Austin Stacks
2	Michael Carlton	Crotta O'Neill's	1-07	10	Ballyheigue
4	John Brennan	St Brendan's	3-00	9	Kenmare
5	John Mike Dooley	Causeway	2-02	8	Abbeydorney
5	John Maher	Lixnaw	2-02	8	St Brendan's
5	John Mike Dooley	Causeway	1-05	8	Abbeydorney
8	Brendan Mahony	Crotta O'Neill's	2-01	7	Causeway
8	Gerry O'Sullivan	Ballyheigue	2-01	7	Crotta O'Neill's
8	Phil Healy	St Brendan's	2-01	7	Lixnaw
8	Barry Sheehan	Abbeydorney	2-01	7	Austin Stacks
8	Tony Maunsell	Abbeydorney	1-04	7	Causeway
8	Pat O'Connell	Lixnaw	0-07	7	Kilmoyley
8	Seán O'Regan	Kenmare	0-07	7	St Pat's
8	Michael Carlton	Crotta O'Neill's	0-07	7	Causeway
