= Stephen Murphy (hurler) =

Irish hurler (born 1996)

Personal information
- Native name: Stiofán Ó Murchú (Irish)
- Born: 1996 (age 29–30) Causeway, County Kerry, Ireland

Sport
- Sport: Hurling
- Position: Goalkeeper
Club
- Years: Club
- Causeway
Club titles
- Kerry titles: 1
Inter-county
- Years: County
- 2015-present: Kerry

Stephen Murphy (born 1996) is an Irish hurler who plays as a goalkeeper for the Kerry senior team.

Born in Causeway, County Kerry, Murphy first played competitive hurling during his schooling at Causeway Comprehensive School. He arrived on the inter-county scene at the age of sixteen when he first linked up with the Kerry minor team before later joining the under-21 side. He made his senior debut during the 2015 league. Murphy quickly became a regular member of the starting fifteen and has won one Christy Ring Cup medal.

At club level Murphy plays with Causeway.

== Honours ==
=== Team ===
Kerry

- Christy Ring Cup (1): 2015
- National League (Division 2A) (1): 2015
- All-Ireland Minor B Hurling Championship (2): 2013, 2014
- All-Ireland U21 B Hurling Championship 2017

Causeway

- Kerry Senior Hurling Championship (1) 2019
- Kerry Under-21 hurling championship (3) 2014, 2015, 2017
