= 1998 Kerry Senior Hurling Championship =

- Dates: 10 July – 11 October 1998
- Teams: 11
- Sponsor: AIB
- Champions: Causeway (7th title); Maurice O'Carroll (captain); Francie Dineen (manager)
- Runners-up: Crotta O'Neill's; Brendan Mahony (captain); Tom Cronin (manager); Tom Kenny (manager)

Tournament statistics
- Matches played: 10
- Goals scored: 36 (3.6 per match)
- Points scored: 216 (21.6 per match)
- Top scorer(s): Michael Carlton (1-23)

The 1998 Kerry Senior Hurling Championship was the 97th staging of the Kerry Senior Hurling Championship since its establishment by the Kerry County Board in 1889. The championship draw took place on 24 February 1998. The championship ran from 10 July to 11 October 1998.

Ballyheigue entered the championship as the defending champions, however, they were beaten by Causeway in the semi-finals.

The final was played on 11 October 1998 at Austin Stack Park in Tralee, between Causeway and Crotta O'Neill's, in what was their second meeting in the final overall and the first final meeting in 19 years. Causeway won the match by 1–14 to 2–10 to claim their seventh championship title overall and the first title in 11 years.

Michael Carlton was the championship's top scorer with 1-23.

== Results ==
=== Preliminary round ===
10 July 1998 Preliminary round	Austin Stacks	1-07 - 3-16	Kenmare	FitzGerald Stadium
	P Teehan 0-5, B Shanahan 1-0, K Kennedy 0-2.		W Creedon 1-3, P Healy 1-2, L Hussey 1-1, M Foley 0-4, S O'Shea 0-3, L Lynch 0-2, TP O'Connor 0-1.

24 July 1998 Preliminary round	St Pat's	0-07 - 2-12	St Brendan's	Austin Stack Park
	M Flynn 0-2, T Dunphy 0-1, B Darcy 0-1, L Moloney 0-1, T Hourigan 0-1, L Morris 0-1.		P Healy 2-8, M Casey 0-2, D Leen 0-1, L O'Connor 0-1.

3 August 1998 Preliminary round	Lixnaw	1-07 - 2-17	Crotta O'Neill's	Austin Stack Park
	P Galvin 1-3, J Maher 0-2, D McCarthy 0-1, P Cronin 0-1.		M Carlton 0-11, P Cronin 1-2, P McGarth 1-0, V Dooley 0-1, D Fuller 0-1, T Stack 0-1, B O'Mahony 0-1.

=== Quarter-finals ===
31 July 1998 Quarter-final	Abbeydorney	1-08 - 4-07	Causeway	Austin Stack Park
	I Maunsell 1-3, L O'Sullivan 0-2, T Maunsell 0-1, T O'Halloran 0-1, B Fealy 0-1.		C Dineen 2-1, JJ Canty 1-2, S Harty 1-0, JM Dooley 0-2, H McEnery 0-2.

1 August 1998 Quarter-final	Kenmare	0-04 - 2-22	Ballyheigue	FitzGerald Stadium
	L Hussey 0-1, S O'Shea 0-1, M Foley 0-1, T Healy 0-1.		G Frehill 1-4, M Slattery 0-7, J Griffin 1-1, B O'Sullivan 0-3, G Lucid 0-3, M Lucid 0-2, L O'Mahony 0-1, K O'Sullivan 0-1.

7 August 1998 Quarter-final	Kilmoyley	3-11 - 4-10	Ballyduff	Austin Stack Park
	O Diggins 0-9, C Walsh 1-1, J Walsh 1-0, M Murnane 1-0, S Fitzgerald 0-1.		K Boyle 2-0, B O'Sullivan 0-6, P O'Rourke 1-1, M Murphy 1-0, M Hennessy 0-2, A O'Grady 0-1.

28 August 1998 Quarter-final	Crotta O'Neill's	3-09 - 1-08	St Brendan's	Austin Stack Park
	S Twomey 1-2, M Carlton 0-5, P McGrath 1-0, V Dooley 1-0, B O'Mahony 0-2.		D Leen 1-1, S Flaherty 0-2, T Healy 0-2, S Synott 0-1, E Leen 0-1, L O'Connor 0-1.

=== Semi-finals ===
6 September 1998 Semi-final	Causeway	2-11 - 2-09	Ballyheigue	Austin Stack Park
	C Dineen 1-1, C Harty 1-1, S Sheehan 0-2, JM Dooley 0-2, L Harty 0-2, T Burke 0-1, G Barrett 0-1, S Harty 0-1.		M Slattery 0-4, M Lucid 1-0, B O'Sullivan 1-0, L O'Mahony 0-2, G Lucid 0-1, G Frehill 0-1, K O'Sullivan 0-1.

20 September 1998 Semi-final	Crotta O'Neill's	2-13 - 0-14	Ballyduff	Austin Stack Park
	S Twomey 1-3, P McGrath 1-1, JP Hickey 0-3, B O'Mahony 0-2, M Carlton 0-2, V Dooley 0-1, J O'Sullivan 0-1.		B O'Sullivan 0-7, L Boyle 0-3, M Hennessy 0-2, K Boyle 0-1, P O'Rourke 0-1.

=== Final ===
11 October 1998 Final	Causeway	1-14 - 2-10	Crotta O'Neill's	Austin Stack Park
	C Dineen 1-1, JJ Canty 0-4, T Burke 0-3, H McEnry 0-2, C Harty 0-2, JM Dooley 0-2.		M Carlton 1-5, D Fitzmaurice 1-0, B O'Mahony 0-2, P Cronin 0-2, V Dooley 0-1.	Referee: B Dunne (Ballyheigue)

== Championship statistics ==
=== Top scorers ===
Overall

Rank	Player	County	Tally	Total	Matches	Average
1	Michael Carlton	Crotta O'Neill's	1-23	26	4	6.50
2	Cyril Dineen	Causeway	4-03	15	3	5.00
3	Philip Healy	St Brendan's	2-08	14	1	14.00
4	Bobby O'Sullivan	Ballyduff	0-13	13	2	6.50
5	Seán Twomey	Crotta O'Neill's	2-05	11	4	2.75
5	Mike Slattery	Ballyheigue	0-11	11	2	5.50

Single game

Rank	Player	Club	Tally	Total	Opposition
1	Philip Healy	St Brendan's	2-08	14	St Pat's
2	Michael Carlton	Crotta O'Neill's	0-11	11	Lixnaw
3	Ollie Diggins	Kilmoyley	0-09	9	Ballyduff
4	Michael Carlton	Crotta O'Neill's	1-05	8	Causeway
5	Cyril Dineen	Causeway	2-01	7	Abbeydorney
5	Gary Frehill	Ballyheigue	1-04	7	Kenmare
5	Mike Slattery	Ballyheigue	0-07	7	Kenmare
5	Bobby O'Sullivan	Ballyduff	0-07	7	Crotta O'Neill's

=== Miscellaneous ===
- Causeway claim a first title in 11 years.
