= Keith Carmody (hurler) =

Irish hurler

Personal information
- Native name: Ceiteach Ó Cearmada (Irish)
- Born: Causeway, County Kerry, Ireland

Sport
- Sport: Hurling
- Position: Midfield
Club
- Years: Club
- Causeway
Club titles
- Kerry titles: 2
Inter-county
- Years: County
- 2014-present: Kerry

Keith Carmody is an Irish hurler who plays as a left-wing-back for the Kerry senior team.

Born in Causeway, County Kerry, Carmody first played competitive hurling during his schooling at Causeway Comprehensive School. He arrived on the inter-county scene at the age of sixteen when he first linked up with the Kerry minor team before later joining the under-21 side. He made his senior debut during the 2014 league. Carmody quickly became a regular member of the starting fifteen and has won one Christy Ring Cup medal, at the end of the year he picked up a Christy Ring All-Star and Christy Ring Player of the Year for 2015

He was part of the Under 21 Hurling/Shinty International team in 2015. He also captained Ireland to victory in the Under 21 Hurling/Shinty International in 2016.

At the club level, Carmody plays with Causeway.

== Honours ==
=== Team ===
Kerry

- Christy Ring Cup (1): 2015
- Christy Ring All Star (1): 2015
- Christy Ring Player of the Year (1): 2015
- National League (Division 2A) (2): 2014, 2015
- All-Ireland Under 21 B Hurling Championship (1): 2013
- All-Ireland Minor B Hurling Championship (2): 2012, 2013

Causeway

- Kerry Senior Hurling Championship (2): 2019, 2022
- Kerry Under-21 hurling championship (2): 2014, 2015
