= Stephen Murphy =

Stephen, Steven or Steve Murphy may refer to:

== Artists, entertainers, journalists ==
- Stephen Murphy (comics), American comic book writer
- Stephen Murphy (lutemaker) (born 1942), lute maker located in Southern France
- Stephen Kennedy Murphy, stage director
- Steve Murphy (news anchor) (born 1960), Canadian television personality
- Steven Murphy (born 1959), English actor better known as Steve Evets
- Steve Murphy (actor) (1876-1953), American actor

== Organizational leaders ==
- Stephen Murphy, director of the British Board of Film Classification (1971–1975)
- Steve Murphy (trade unionist) (born 1961), English trade union leader
- Steven Murphy (born 1954), American publishing and business executive
- Steven A. Murphy, Canadian academic administrator

== Politicians and government workers ==
- Stephen J. Murphy, member of the Boston City Council
- Stephen Murphy III (born 1962), American judge
- Steve Murphy (politician) (born 1957), American politician from Minnesota
- Stephen Murphy (civil servant) (born 1957), DEA agent portrayed by Boyd Holbrook in the Netflix series Narcos

== Sportspeople ==
- Stephen Murphy (dual player) (born 1986), Irish hurler and Gaelic footballer
- Stephen Murphy (footballer) (born 1978), Irish footballer
- Stephen Murphy (hurler) (born 1996), Irish hurler
- Stephen Murphy (ice hockey) (born 1981), Scottish ice hockey goaltender
- Stephen Murphy (snooker player) (born 1969), Irish snooker player

== Fiction ==
- Steven Murphy, a character in the crime TV series Narcos
