= 1979 Kerry County Council election =

Election in Ireland

← 1974	7 June 1979	1985 →

All 26 seats on Kerry County Council
	First party	Second party	Third party
Party	Fianna Fáil	Fine Gael	Labour
Seats won	14	7	2
	Fourth party	Fifth party
Party	Sinn Féin	Independent
Seats won	1	2
- Map showing the area of Kerry County Council
Council control after election
Fianna Fáil

An election to all 26 seats on Kerry County Council took place on 7 June 1979 as part of that year's Irish local elections. Councillors were elected from 4 local electoral areas (LEAs) on the electoral system of proportional representation by means of the single transferable vote (PR-STV).

== Results by party ==
Party	Seats	±	1st pref	FPv%	±%
Fianna Fáil	14		27,371	44.70	
Fine Gael	7		17,175	28.05	
Labour	2		7,647	12.49	
Sinn Féin	1		3,152	5.15	
Sinn Féin The Workers' Party	0		1,159	1.89	
Independent	2		4,732	7.73	
Totals	26		61,236	100.00	

== Results by local electoral area ==
=== Killarney ===
Killarney: 6 seats
Party	Candidate	FPv%	Count						
Party	Candidate	FPv%	1	2	3	4	5	6	7
Labour	Sen. Michael Moynihan	19.51%	2,737						
Fianna Fáil	Jackie Healy-Rae	16.35%	2,294						
Fianna Fáil	Tom Fleming	14.48%	2,032						
Fianna Fáil	Patrick J. Cronin	11.22%	1,574	1,644	1,806	1,832	1,861	1,877	1,946
Fine Gael	Paudie Connor	8.27%	1,161	1,308	1,329	1,355	1,567	1,568	1,883
Sinn Féin The Workers' Party	Redmond Sullivan	8.26%	1,159	1,324	1,362	1,412	1,543	1,545	1,651
Fine Gael	Thomas Dennehy	7.74%	1,086	1,130	1,139	1,203	1,383	1,389	
Fine Gael	Christopher McSweeney	7.11%	998	1,101	1,120	1,184	1,401	1,403	2,068
Fine Gael	Tom Randles	5.37%	753	841	879	895			
Labour	Joan Winter	1.69%	237	352	354				
Electorate: 18,656 Valid: 14,031 (75.21%) Spoilt: 213 (1.14%) Quota: 2,005 Turnout: 14,244 (76.35%)

=== Killorglin ===
Killorglin: 6 seats
Party	Candidate	FPv%	Count					
Party	Candidate	FPv%	1	2	3	4	5	6
Fianna Fáil	Mary O'Donoghue	15.07%	1,811					
Fine Gael	Michael Connor-Scarteen	14.23%	1,710	1,711	1,730			
Fianna Fáil	Thomas Cahill	11.71%	1,408	1,415	1,482	1,586	1,633	1,829
Fine Gael	Danny Kissane	9.89%	1,189	1,189	1,267	1,502	1,529	1,552
Fianna Fáil	Ted O'Connor	9.49%	1,141	1,160	1,196	1,231	1,272	1,626
Fine Gael	Dan Barry	9.38%	1,127	1,146	1,160	1,220	1,334	1,355
Independent	Michael O'Connell	9.14%	1,098	1,119	1,196	1,266	1,472	1,604
Fianna Fáil	John Joe Brien	8.45%	1,016	1,030	1,035	1,038	1,069	
Sinn Féin	Tim Garvey	4.80%	577	588	612	633		
Fine Gael	Teresa Murphy	4.29%	516	516	583			
Labour	Sean Moriarty	3.54%	426	427				
Electorate: 16,620 Valid: 12,019 (72.32%) Spoilt: 215 (1.76%) Quota: 1,718 Turnout: 12,234 (73.61%)

=== Listowel ===
Listowel: 6 seats
Party	Candidate	FPv%	Count									
Party	Candidate	FPv%	1	2	3	4	5	6	7	8	9	10
Fianna Fáil	Noel Brassil	11.53%	1,724	1,742	1,762	1,764	1,821	1,827	1,851	1,882	1,916	1,929
Fianna Fáil	Kit Ahern TD	11.38%	1,701	1,704	1,793	1,823	1,836	1,920	1,948	2,040	2,286	
Fine Gael	Senator Gerard Lynch	10.77%	1,610	1,612	1,644	1,773	1,880	1,940	2,154			
Fianna Fáil	Dan Kiely	10.34%	1,546	1,547	1,574	1,583	1,589	1,706	1,815	1,874	1,982	2,015
Sinn Féin	Robert Beasley	10.17%	1,521	1,523	1,539	1,555	1,564	1,604	1,660	1,842	1,979	1,993
Labour	John Joe O'Sullivan	8.90%	1,331	1,343	1,351	1,357	1,483	1,493	1,541	1,612	1,770	1,787
Fianna Fáil	Eamon Walsh	8.67%	1,296	1,298	1,362	1,378	1,378	1,469	1,487	1,605	1,794	1,859
Independent	Jack Larkin	6.88%	1,028	1,028	1,074	1,173	1,187	1,268	1,325	1,480		
Fine Gael	John Francis Ahern	4.93%	737	738	745	773	793	832	1,002			
Fine Gael	Jeremiah O'Connor	4.45%	666	667	671	707	772	805				
Independent	Thomas Sheehan	3.83%	573	573	591	598	599					
Fine Gael	Tom Lawlor	2.74%	410	423	425	435						
Fine Gael	Brendan Halloran	2.64%	395	396	407							
Fianna Fáil	Tony O'Callaghan	2.35%	351	352								
Independent	Tom Dineen	0.41%	61									
Electorate: 19,867 Valid: 14,950 (75.25%) Spoilt: 230 (1.52%) Quota: 2,136 Turnout: 15,180 (76.41%)

=== Tralee ===
Tralee: 8 seats
Party	Candidate	FPv%	Count						
Party	Candidate	FPv%	1	2	3	4	5	6	7
Fianna Fáil	Tom McEllistrim, Jnr TD	18.26%	3,695						
Fianna Fáil	Denis Foley	15.33%	3,103						
Labour	Dick Spring	14.41%	2,916						
Fine Gael	Michael Begley TD	11.07%	2,240	2,258					
Independent	James Courtney	9.75%	1,972	2,073	2,115	2,185	2,233	2,278	
Fianna Fáil	Thomas Fitzgerald	7.52%	1,522	1,802	1,957	1,982	2,023	2,037	2,053
Fianna Fáil	Michael Long	5.72%	1,157	1,715	1,973	2,026	2,058	2,286	
Fine Gael	John Blennerhassett	5.62%	1,138	1,340	1,514	1,729	2,204	2,719	
Sinn Féin	Michael Horgan	5.21%	1,054	1,184	1,286	1,387	1,447	1,492	1,532
Fine Gael	Timothy Nelligan	4.01%	812	875	890	976	1,041		
Fine Gael	Frank Gleasure	3.10%	627	721	829	946			
Electorate: 29,352 Valid: 20,236 (68.94%) Spoilt: 289 (1.41%) Quota: 2,249 Turnout: 20,525 (69.93%)
