= Tralee Parnells GAA =

Gaelic games club in County Kerry, Ireland

Tralee Parnells
- Founded: 1890
- County: Kerry
- Nickname: The Parnells
- Grounds: Caherslee, Tralee

Playing kits
Standard colours

Tralee Parnells are a Gaelic Athletic Association (GAA) club from the town of Tralee in County Kerry, Ireland. The club is primarily involved in hurling and camogie. While a club named Parnells was founded in Tralee in the late 19th century, the modern club was formed in 2012.

== History ==
=== Original club ===
The original Parnells won 2 Kerry Senior Hurling Championships in 1918 and 1919. The All-Ireland winning football captain, John Joe Sheehy, played with the club. The club appeared in their first final in 1911 when they lost to fellow Tralee side Tralee Mitchels 5–03 to 1-02. They won their first title in 1918 overcoming Kilgarvan 1–10 to 4-00. They were due to face the same opposition in 1919 but received a walkover. They made the semi-final in 1920 and were to play Kenmare but the championship was abandoned. The championship was abandoned for much of the 1920s and by the time it resumed, Tralee had three new clubs in the shape of Rock Street, Strand Road and Boherbee. Parnells last played in the 1924 championship when they beat Ballyduff in the only game played 6–03 to 1-02.

=== Modern club ===
While the original club disbanded in the 1920s, a new Parnells club was reformed in 2012 to promote underage hurling in Tralee. For the first number of years, the club had teams up to Under 16 level. The club joined with other North Kerry clubs at minor level such as Ballyheigue and Abbeydorney. In 2017, along with Abbeydorney, they made it to the Kerry MHC final but lost out to Crotta O'Neill's. In 2018, the club fielded their first stand-alone minor team and had a win over Crotta O'Neill's.

In 2019, 100 years on from winning the 1919 Kerry SHC, the club returned to adult hurling with the announcement of an Under 21 and Intermediate team with plans to field an adult camogie team.

In the clubs first season, they qualified for the Kerry Intermediate Hurling Championship semi-final where they lost to Kilgarvan.

In 2020, the club went a step further and qualified for the final, but lost out to Dr. Crokes.

In 2021, the club represented Kerry in the Munster Junior Club Hurling Championship. They suffered a heavy loss to Tipperary champions Skeheenarinky.

In 2022, the underage section of the club won the Kerry Féile na nGael Div 1 title, before later adding the Féile na nGael Div 3 title.

The next milestone for the club came in 2023 as they won the Kerry Intermediate Hurling Championship with a win over St Brendan's.

2024 saw the club return to the senior championship for the first time in 100 years. In 2025, the club made history when they won the Kerry Minor Hurling Championship for the first time.

== Honours ==
- Kerry Senior Hurling Championship (2): 1918, 1919
- Kerry Intermediate Hurling Championship (1): 2023
- Kerry County Senior Hurling League Division 2 (1): 2023
- North Kerry Under 21 Hurling Championship (1): 2021
- Kerry Minor Hurling Championship (1): 2025
- Féile na nGael Division 3 winners (1): 2022
