= Ladys Walk GAA =

Ladys Walk
- Cosán na nAinnir
- County: Kerry
- Colours: Green and white
- Grounds: Ballyduff
- Coordinates: 52°26′57.49″N 9°40′23.89″W

Playing kits
Standard colours

Ladys Walk are a Gaelic Athletic Association hurling club in Ballyduff in North County Kerry, Ireland. They are the Ballyduff second team. They play in the County Intermediate Hurling Championship.

== Roll of honour ==
=== County Intermediate Hurling Championship ===
- Kerry Intermediate Hurling Championship: (2)
  - 2002, 2008
  - Runners-Up 1998, 1999, 2000, 2007, 2025

Year	Winner	Opponent
2008	Ladys Walk	Kenmare
2007	Kilgarvan	Ladys Walk
2002	Ladys Walk	Kilgarvan
2000	Kenmare	Ladys Walk
1999	Dr Crokes	Ladys Walk
1998	St Brendan's	Ladys Walk

See: North Kerry - a hurling history [written by Tommy O'Connor, published by the North Kerry Hurling Board, 2015; ISBN 978-0951573631]
