= Maurice Leahy =

Irish hurler

Personal information
- Born: Causeway, County Kerry

Sport
- Sport: Hurling
- Position: Forward
Club
- Years: Club
- Causeway Clonakilty Newtownshandrum
Club titles
- Kerry titles: 5
Inter-county
- Years: County
- 1977-1989: Kerry
Inter-county titles
- Munster titles: 0
- All-Irelands: 0

Maurice Leahy (born 1952 in Causeway, County Kerry) is an Irish former hurling manager and former player. He played hurling with his local club Causeway and with the Kerry senior inter-county team from 1977 until 1989. Leahy later served as manager of the Kerry senior inter-county hurling team on six occasions.

== Playing career ==
=== Club ===
Leahy played his club hurling with his local Causeway club. He had his first major success in 1979 when he captured his first Kerry Senior Hurling Championship title. It was Causeway's first championship title since 1932. Leahy added three more county medals to his collection as Causeway completed a "four-in-a-row". He won a fifth county title in 1989.

In the early to mid 1970s, he played both club football and hurling in Cork. Firstly football for Clonakilty for eight years. He also spent a year with Newtownshandrum, with whom he won a Cork Intermediate Hurling Championship title in 1976.

=== Inter-county ===
Leahy made his senior inter-county debut with Kerry in 1977. Kerry were the reigning All-Ireland 'B' champions when he joined the panel, however, Kerry surrendered their title. Three years later, in 1980, Leahy took on the role of player-manager in 1980. It was the beginning of a successful period for Kerry. 1983 saw Leahy collect an All-Ireland 'B' medal as the men from 'the Kingdom' defeated London to take the title. He gave up the position of manager following that victory, however, he was reappointed as manager in 1985. The following year Leahy captured his second All-Ireland 'B' medal as player-manager. He retired from inter-county hurling in 1989.

While better known as a hurler, he also played with the Kerry senior football team during the mid 1970s.

== Post-playing career ==
Not long after his retirement from playing, Leahy was back as manager again in 1989. His stay was a short one on this occasion and he left without success in 1990. Two years later, in 1992, Leahy served as a selector when John Meyler took charge of Kerry's hurlers. This period included victory over Waterford in the 1993 championship. Leahy remained as a selector for most of the 1990s. He returned to the top job for the fourth time in 2001. His fourth term in charge saw Kerry defeat Westmeath to take the National Hurling League division two title. Leahy was replaced as manager again in 2002, however, he returned for another short stint in 2003. He completed his sixth term as manager between 2006 and 2007.

Leahy has county championship titles with local clubs Ballyheigue and Lixnaw. He also managed the Kilcummin footballers as well as Causeway Comprehensive School teams with whom he won 2 All Ireland Vocational Schools title in 2009 and 2010.

He also managed the Tralee IT Sigerson Cup team in 2008.

Sporting positions
Preceded by	Kerry Senior Hurling Manager; 1980-1983	Succeeded by
Preceded by	Kerry Senior Hurling Manager; 1985-1987	Succeeded by Con Roche
Preceded by	Kerry Senior Hurling Manager; 1989-1990	Succeeded by
Preceded by Michael O'Halloran	Kerry Senior Hurling Manager; 2000-2001	Succeeded by Bernie O'Connor
Preceded by Bernie O'Connor	Kerry Senior Hurling Manager; 2002-2004	Succeeded by Jerry Molyneaux
Preceded by Jerry Molyneaux	Kerry Senior Hurling Manager; 2006-2007	Succeeded by Pat Heffernan
