= 1997 Kerry Senior Hurling Championship =

- Dates: 18 July – 21 September 1997
- Teams: 11
- Sponsor: AIB
- Champions: Ballyheigue (4th title); Nicholas Roche (captain); John Sheehan (manager)
- Runners-up: Causeway; Maurice Carroll (captain); Francie Dineen (manager)

Tournament statistics
- Matches played: 11
- Goals scored: 32 (2.91 per match)
- Points scored: 241 (21.91 per match)
- Top scorer(s): Maurcie Murnane (2-28)

The 1997 Kerry Senior Hurling Championship was the 96th staging of the Kerry Senior Hurling Championship since its establishment by the Kerry County Board in 1889. The draw for the opening round fixtures took place on 27 February 1997. The championship ran from 18 July to 21 September 1997.

Ballyheigue were the defending champions.

The final was played on 21 September 1997 at Austin Stack Park in Tralee, between Ballyheigue and Causeway, in what was their first ever meeting in the final. Ballyheigue won the match by 0–13 to 0–05 to claim their fourth championship title overall and a second title in succession.

Kilmoyley's Maurice Murnane was the championship's top scorer with 2-28.

== Results ==
=== Preliminary round ===
18 July 1997 Preliminary round	St Pat's	1-05 - 6-19	Abbeydorney	Austin Stack Park
	C Mannix 1-1, T Hourigan 0-1, K McNamara 0-1, J Kennedy 0-1, J O'Sullivan 0-1.		P McElligott 3-3, I Maunsell 1-4, T Maunsell 0-5, T O'Connell 1-1, D Nolan 1-1, L O'Sullivan 0-3, B Sheehan 0-2.

19 July 1997 Preliminary round	Causeway	2-10 - 0-08	Kenmare	FitzGerald Stadium
	DJ Leahy 1-2, C Fealy 0-4, JM Dooley 1-0, D Harty 0-2, JJ Canty 0-2.		S McIntyre 0-3, J O'Leary 0-2, TP O'Connell 0-1, W Creedon 0-1, P Murphy 0-1.

23 July 1997 Preliminary round	Lixnaw	1-16 - 2-13	Kilmoyley	Austin Stack Park
	J O'Connell 1-8, J Maher 0-3, P Galvin 0-2, D McCarthy 0-1, T McKenna 0-1, P Cronin 0-1.		M Murnane 2-8, I Brick 0-2, J Walsh 0-2, C Walsh 0-1.

31 July 1997 Preliminary round replay	Lixnaw	0-09 - 1-16	Kilmoyley	Austin Stack Park
	J O'Connell 0-5, PJ McElligott 0-1, P Cronin 0-1, J McCarthy 0-1, D McCarthy 0-1.		M Murnane 0-9, O Diggins 1-0, C Walsh 0-3, M Regan 0-2, R Gentleman 0-2.

=== Quarter-finals ===
8 August 1997 Quarter-final	Abbeydorney	2-08 - 2-16	Kilmoyley	Austin Stack Park
	T Maunsell 1-1, L O'Sullivan 1-1, I Maunsell 0-2, T O'Connell 0-2, B Sheehan 0-1, L McCarthy 0-1.		C Walsh 1-4, M Murnane 0-5, R Gentleman 1-1, M Regan 0-4, O Diggins 0-2.

8 August 1997 Quarter-final	Ballyduff	declared void	Austin Stacks	Causeway Grounds

9 August 1997 Quarter-final	Ballyheigue	2-16 - 0-12	Crotta O'Neill's	Austin Stack Park
	M Slattery 2-5, K O'Sullivan 0-3, N Flahive 0-2, G Frehill 0-1, G Lucid 0-1, B O'Sullivan 0-1, N Roche 0-1, WJ Leen 0-1, J Healy 0-1.		M Carlton 0-6, B O'Mahony 0-4, P Cronin 0-1, P O'Donoghue 0-1.

10 August 1997 Quarter-final	Causeway	3-05 - 1-11	St Brendan's	Austin Stack Park
	JM Dooley 1-5, P Spillane 1-0, JJ Canty 1-0.		D Leen 1-3, P Healy 0-4, M Casey 0-3, L O'Connor 0-1.

16 August 1997 Quarter-final replay	Causeway	2-08 - 1-10	St Brendan's	Austin Stack Park
	P Spillane 1-1, JM Dooley 0-4, D Harty 1-0, S Sheehan 0-1, C Harty 0-1, H McEnery 0-1.		S O'Loughlin 1-2, P Healy 0-3, M Casey 0-2, D Leen 0-2, N Clifford 0-1.

=== Semi-finals ===
23 August 1997 Semi-final	Ballyheigue	2-08 - 0-10	Ballyduff	Austin Stack Park
	B O'Sullivan 1-2, G Lucid 1-0, G Frehill 0-3, K O'Sullivan 0-2, S Higgins 0-1.		B O'Sullivan 0-4, P O'Rourke 0-3, L Boyle 0-1, K Boyle 0-1, M Hennessy 0-1.

30 August 1997 Semi-final	Causeway	3-11 - 1-12	Kilmoyley	Austin Stack Park
	JM Dooley 3-5, JJ Canty 0-2, DJ Leahy 0-1, H McEnery 0-1, S Sheehan 0-1, T Burke 0-1.		M Murnane 0-6, J McCarthy 1-1, O Diggins 0-2, M Regan 0-1, C Walsh 0-1, R Gentleman 0-1.

=== Final ===
21 September 1997 Final	Ballyheigue	0-13 - 0-05	Causeway	Tralee
	B O'Sullivan 0-8, M Slattery 0-3, G Frehill 0-1, E Flahive 0-1.		JM Dooley 0-4, C Harty 0-1.	Stadium: Austin Stack Park; Referee: Kevin Leen (Crotta O'Neills)

== Championship statistics ==
=== Top scorers ===
Overall

Rank	Player	County	Tally	Total	Matches	Average
1	Maurice Murnane	Kilmoyley	2-28	34	4	8.50
2	John Mike Dooley	Causeway	5-18	33	5	6.60
3	Johnny O'Connell	Lixnaw	1-13	16	2	8.00
4	Mike Slattery	Ballyheigue	2-08	14	3	4.66
4	Brendan O'Sullivan	Ballyheigue	1-11	14	3	4.66

Single game

Rank	Player	Club	Tally	Total	Opposition
1	John Mike Dooley	Causeway	3-05	14	Kilmoyley
1	Maurice Murnane	Kilmoyley	2-08	14	Lixnaw
3	Paul McElligott	Abbeydorney	3-03	12	St Pat's
4	Mike Slattery	Ballyheigue	2-05	11	Crotta O'Neill's
4	Johnny O'Connell	Lixnaw	1-08	11	Kilmoyley
6	Maurice Murnane	Kilmoyley	0-09	9	Lixnaw
7	John Mike Dooley	Causeway	1-05	8	St Brendan's
7	Brendan O'Sullivan	Ballyheigue	0-08	8	Causeway
9	Ian Maunsell	Abbeydorney	1-04	7	St Pat's
9	Tony Maunsell	Abbeydorney	1-04	7	St Pat's

=== Miscellaneous ===
- Austin Stacks were thrown out of the championship after objecting to the venue choice for their quarter-final game against Ballyduff.
- Ballyheigue retain the title for the first, and to date only, time.
- * Ballyheigue and Causeway face each other in the final for the first time.
