= Tom Randles =

Tom Randles may refer to:

- Tommy Randles (born 1940), former footballer for New Zealand
- Tom Randles (hurler), Irish hurler
