= Neilus Flynn =

Irish hurler

Personal information
- Native name: Neilus Ó Floinn (Irish)
- Born: Causeway, County Kerry

Sport
- Sport: Hurling
- Position: Forward
Club
- Years: Club
- 1930s 1930s: Causeway St Brendan's Shannon Rovers
Club titles
- Kerry titles: 2
Inter-county
- Years: County
- 1930s: Kerry
Inter-county titles
- Munster titles: 0
- All-Irelands: 0

Neilus Flynn was a hurler who played hurling with Causeway in County Kerry. He was the club's first Kerry Senior Hurling Championship-winning captain in 1932. He had the honour of captaining two different teams to Championship success; Causeway in 1932, and St Brendan's in 1936. He also captained a Shannon Rovers amalgamation in the 1939 County Final defeat to Crotta.

The inscription on the cup reads:

CORN NEILUS Ó FLOINN CRAOBH IOMÁINT

SINSIR CONTAE CHIARRAÍ

BRONNAITHE AG MUINTIR UÍ FHOINN

AN TÓCHAR AR CHOISTE CHIARRAÍ C.L.G

I GCUIMHE A NATHAIR NEILUS

MEAN FHÓIR 1987.
