= Tom Randles (hurler) =

Irish hurler and Gaelic footballer

Personal information
- Born: Kilgarvan, County Kerry

Sport
- Sport: Hurling
- Position: Forward
Club
- Years: Club
- 1950's-1980's: Kilgarvan
Club titles
- Kerry titles: 2
Inter-county
- Years: County
- Kerry
Inter-county titles
- Munster titles: 0
- All-Irelands: 0

Tom Randles is a former hurler from Kilgarvan County Kerry. He played hurling for the Kilgarvan club in the 1950s up to the 1980s, winning County Championships in 1956 and 1958. In 2008, he made headlines by playing a full 60-minute match for Kilgarvan at the age of 71, fifty years after winning his last county championship. He also played football with Kilgarvan.

== Politics ==
Randles unsuccessfully ran for election to Kerry County Council in the Killarney area on four occasions, initially as a Fine Gael candidate in 1979 and 1985 and as an Independent in 1999 and 2004. Randles also ran in the November 1982 Irish general election for Fine Gael, as a running mate to then TD Michael Begley in the constituency of Kerry South. He was again unsuccessful, polling a distant fifth in the three-seat constituency with 2.7% of the vote.
