= Min Dong (electrical engineer) =

Chinese-Canadian electrical engineer (born 1976)

- Born: Beijing, China
- Education: Tsinghua University (B.Eng., 1998); Cornell University (M.S., 2003; Ph.D., 2004)
- Known for: Signal processing; wireless communications
- Awards: Fellow of the IEEE (2024)
- Scientific career
- Fields: Electrical engineering
- Workplaces: Ontario Tech University; University of Toronto (adjunct)
- Thesis: Efficient Information Retrieval and Processing in Wireless Communication Systems and Sensor Networks (2004)
- Doctoral advisor: Lang Tong
- Website: sites.google.com/ontariotechu.net/dong

Min Dong is a Chinese-Canadian electrical engineer whose research involves signal processing, including resource balancing in cloud computing and smart grids, and pilot symbol assisted wireless communications in which a special "pilot" symbol is periodically transmitted to recalibrate communications channels. She is a professor in the Department of Electrical, Computer and Software Engineering at Ontario Tech University.

== Early life and education ==
Dong was born in Beijing, and writes that she "grew up on the campus of Tsinghua University". She graduated from Tsinghua University with a bachelor's degree in automation and electrical engineering in 1998. She completed a Ph.D. in electrical and computer engineering at Cornell University in 2004, after earning a master's degree there in 2003. Her dissertation, Efficient Information Retrieval and Processing in Wireless Communication Systems and Sensor Networks, was supervised by Lang Tong.

== Career ==
She worked for Qualcomm, in San Diego, California, from 2004 to 2008, before joining Ontario Tech University. She also holds a courtesy appointment in the Department of Electrical & Computer Engineering at the University of Toronto.

== Recognition ==
Dong was named an IEEE Fellow, in the 2024 class of fellows, "for contributions to transmission design and resource optimization for wireless communications". She was awarded Outstanding Editorial Board Member Award by the IEEE Signal Processing Society in 2026.
