= Andrea E. Kirkwood =

Canadian environmental microbiologist

- Born: Andrea Elizabeth Kirkwood; Scarborough, Ontario, Canada
- Education: University of Waterloo (BS); McMaster University (MS); University of Toronto (PhD)
- Known for: Freshwater algal ecology; urban water quality research
- Awards: Ontario Tech Research Excellence Chair, 2023–2025
- Scientific career
- Fields: Environmental microbiology; Aquatic ecology
- Workplaces: Ontario Tech University
- Thesis: The role of cyanobacteria in pulp and paper waste-treatment systems (2003)
- Doctoral advisors: R. Fulthorpe and C. Nalewajko.

Andrea Elizabeth Kirkwood is a Canadian environmental microbiologist and aquatic ecologist who is a professor in the Faculty of Science at Ontario Tech University in Oshawa, Ontario.

== Early life and education ==
Kirkwood was born in Scarborough, Ontario. She completed a joint-honours degree in Environmental Studies and Biology at the University of Waterloo in 1994, followed by a Master of Science in aquatic ecology at McMaster University in 1996. She obtained a Doctor of Philosophy in environmental microbiology from the University of Toronto in 2003. Her thesis The role of cyanobacteria in pulp and paper waste-treatment systems was completed under the supervision of R. Fulthorpe and C. Nalewajko.

Following her doctoral studies, Kirkwood conducted postdoctoral research at Oklahoma State University from 2002 to 2004 and at the University of Calgary from 2005 to 2008. While at Calgary she studied didymosphenia geminata and its prevalence near dams.

== Career ==
Kirkwood joined Ontario Tech University as an assistant professor in 2008. She was promoted to associate professor in 2014 and to full professor in 2022. According to the University of Waterloo, she was the first woman to attain the rank of full professor in Ontario Tech's Faculty of Science. She has taught courses in conservation biology, environmental research methods, and aquatic ecology.

== Research ==
Kirkwood is know for work related viruses in the environment. Her research focuses on freshwater ecosystems, including algal ecology, aquatic invasive species, and urban water quality.

In 2020 Kirkwood lent her voice to the case against development of the Duffins Creek wetland due to increased risk of flooding. She has also commented publicly on issues involving freshwater protection and Great Lakes research.

Kirkwood is a member of the Collaborative Laboratory in Environmental Aquatic Research (CLEAR) at Ontario Tech. The laboratory studies aquatic communities in lakes, wetlands, rivers, creeks, and stormwater systems, including the effects of urbanization, land-use change, and invasive species. Her research has received funding from the Natural Sciences and Engineering Research Council of Canada, Environment and Climate Change Canada, and the Ontario Trillium Foundation. From 2016 to 2019, Kirkwood served on the International Joint Commission's Great Lakes Science Advisory Board.

== Recognition ==
In 2014, Canadian Science Publishing profiled Kirkwood as part of its "Women in Science" series. She was appointed Ontario Tech Research Excellence Chair in Urban Water for the 2023–2025 period.

== Selected publications ==
- Harrow-Lyle, T. J.; Kirkwood, A. E. (2022). "The non-native charophyte Nitellopsis obtusa (starry stonewort) influences shifts in macrophyte diversity and community structure in lakes across a geologically heterogeneous landscape". Aquatic Ecology. doi:10.1007/s10452-022-09950-0.
- Smith, E. D.; Balika, D.; Kirkwood, A. E. (2021). "Nearshore water quality and land-use scale: community science-based monitoring in a large, shallow Canadian lake". Lake and Reservoir Management. 37 (4): 431–444. doi:10.1080/10402381.2021.1989525.
- Strangway, C.; Bowman, M. F.; Kirkwood, A. E. (2017). "Assessing landscape and contaminant point sources as spatial determinants of water quality in the Vermilion River System, Ontario, Canada". Environmental Science and Pollution Research. doi:10.1007/s11356-017-9933-1.
- Harrow-Lyle, T. J.; Kirkwood, A. E. (2021). "Low benthic oxygen and high internal phosphorus loading associated with Nitellopsis obtusa in a large, polymictic lake". Frontiers in Environmental Science. doi:10.3389/fenvs.2021.735509.
- Gilbert, N.; Fulthorpe, R.; Kirkwood, A. E. (2012). "Microbial diversity and biodegradation potential of urban wetlands with different input regimes". Canadian Journal of Microbiology. 58: 887–897.
