= Vivian Stamatopoulos =

University academic

Academic background
- Education: York University
- Thesis: Young Carers in Canada: An Examination of the Prevalence, Policy and Practice of Young People Providing Unpaid Care (2018)
- Doctoral advisor: Norene Pupo

Academic work
- Institutions: Ontario Tech University
- Main interests: Ontario Long Term Care Home Safety

Vivian Stamatopoulos is a Canadian university academic and an advocate for better long term care in Ontario.

She is the founder of Canadians 4 LTC, and has authored widely cited papers on nursing standards and the support of young carers in Canada.

== Education ==
Stamatopoulos has both a Master's degree and a PhD in sociology from York University.

== Career ==
=== Teaching ===
Stamatopoulos is an associate professor at Ontario Tech University in Oshawa, where she lectures on sociology.

Her research has been used to show the significantly worse support for young people who provide family care in Canada compared to the UK.

=== Long term care home advocacy ===
Stamatopoulos has been advocating for better government oversight of long term care homes since before the COVID-19 pandemic but became prominent spokesperson during 2020. She advocates for stronger incentives to motivate improvements in long term care, government reform of rules, and criticized the Ontario Government for introducing legislation to absolve corporations from legal liabilities. In 2021, she advocated for government take over of failing care homes.

In May 2021, she spoke of the need for improved air conditioning in long term care homes. In June she was critical of personal support workers who posted TikTok videos mocking long term care residents. In a June 2022 article in The Conversation, co-authored with Charlene Chu, they presented their research on the trauma experienced by caregivers during the initial period of the COVID-19 pandemic. As well, they discussed ideas that could be implemented in the future to reduce the trauma experienced by caregivers.

Stamatopoulos has undertaken more than 200 expert interviews about long-term care during the COVID-19 pandemic.

She is the founder of Canadians 4 LTC.

== Selected publications ==
- Stamatopoulos et al, Nursing Home Staffing Standards and Staffing Levels in Six Countries, 2012, Journal of Nursing Scholarship, https://doi.org/10.1111/j.1547-5069.2011.01430.x
- Stamatopoulos V., Supporting young carers: a qualitative review of young carer services in Canada, 2015, International Journal of Adolescence and Youth, https://doi.org/10.1080/02673843.2015.1061568

== Awards ==
Stamatopoulos won the York University President’s University-wide Teaching Award in 2015, the Women Achiever Award in 2020, and the 2021 Doris Anderson award.

In 2021, she was recognised by the Toronto Star as one of the top 20 people who advocated for COVID-19 vaccinations, and was identified as a 2021 health hero by Canadian magazine Best Health. In 2024, she received the 2024 International Conference on Aging, Innovation and Rehabilitation (ICAIR) award for Paper of the Year for the paper “It’s the worst thing I’ve ever been put through in my life”: the trauma experienced by essential family caregivers of loved ones in long-term care during the COVID-19 pandemic in Canada.
