= Ontario Tech University =

Public university in Ontario, Canada

University of Ontario Institute of Technology
- Other name: Ontario Tech University
- Motto: Cogitando et Agendo Ducemus (Latin)
- Motto in English: "By thinking and doing we shall lead"
- Type: Public
- Established: 2002; 24 years ago
- Academic affiliations: COU; Universities Canada
- Endowment: C$23.8 million
- Chancellor: Mitch Frazer
- President: Steven A. Murphy
- Provost: Lori Livingston
- Academic staff: 341
- Administrative staff: 517
- Students: 11,050 (2022) (Note: The following figure is the total number of students enrolled in a full time or part-time undergraduate and graduate program. The figure does not include people enrolled in a continuing education course/program with the university.)
- Undergraduates: 10,030 (2022)
- Postgraduates: 1,020 (2022)
- Location: Oshawa, Ontario, Canada; 43°56′41″N 78°53′30″W
- Campus: Urban/suburban
Colours
Future Blue, Simcoe Blue, Tech Tangerine
- Nickname: Ridgebacks
- Sporting affiliations: U Sports – OUA
- Mascot: Hunter the Ridgeback
- Website: ontariotechu.ca

The University of Ontario Institute of Technology, branded as Ontario Tech University or Ontario Tech, is a public research university located in Oshawa, Ontario, Canada. The university's main campus is located on approximately 160 hectares (400 acres) of land in northern Oshawa, while its secondary satellite campus is situated in downtown Oshawa. The university is a co-educational institution that operates seven academic faculties.

The institution was founded in 2002 and adopted the brand name Ontario Tech University in 2018. The legal name of the university is unchanged.

In its nearly first decade of operation, the university developed its main campus with the construction of several new buildings. In 2011, the university opened its secondary campus in downtown Oshawa.

In 2021, there were approximately 10,100 undergraduates and 970 graduate students enrolled at the university. In 2022, there were over 25,500 alumni.

== History ==
The University of Ontario Institute of Technology was founded in 2002 by the passage of Bill 109, the University of Ontario Institute of Technology Act, 2002, by the Legislative Assembly of Ontario on June 27, 2002. It is a public university emphasizing science and technology and was a part of the Ontario government's initiative to create more spaces in post-secondary institutions for the flood of post-secondary students in 2003. Ontario Tech is located in the Durham Region of Ontario.

Ontario Tech offers graduate and post-graduate programs and research opportunities. At first there were 947 students in September 2003 and total enrolment was over 5,000 in the 2007–2008 school year. The student population today is over 10,000 students.

Construction on the university's first buildings, designed by Diamond Schmitt Architects, began in 2002, and included a geothermal heating and cooling system extending 190m under the main campus quadrangle. These first buildings, three in total, were completed by the end of 2004. The Ontario Power Generation (OPG) building (funded by OPG) and the Campus Recreation and Wellness Centre (CRWC) were built in 2007. The university purchased the historic Regent Theatre in downtown Oshawa in 2009 and renovated it for use as a lecture theatre in 2010. The Clean Energy Research Laboratory (CERL) opened in 2010. In 2011, the Automotive Centre of Excellence (ACE) and the Energy Systems and Nuclear Science Research Centre (ERC) opened. In 2014, the UOIT-Baagwating Indigenous Student Centre (UBISC) opened. In 2017, the Software and Informatics Research Centre (SIRC) was built.

In March 2019, the school was rebranded as Ontario Tech University.

On June 10, 2019, construction of Shawenjigewining (SHA) Hall began. The building officially opened November 4, 2021.

== Campus ==
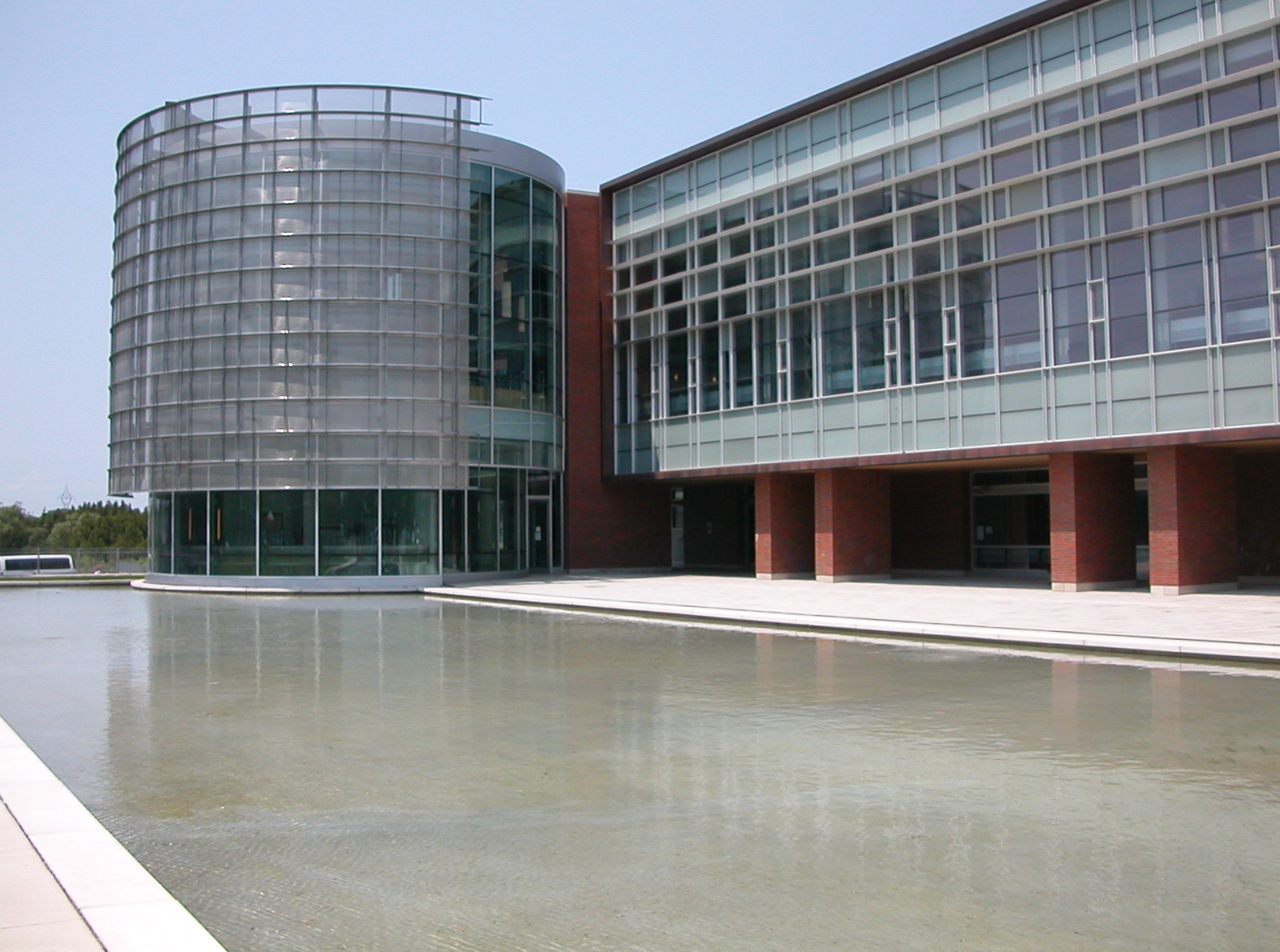
North Campus Library

=== North campus ===
The North campus is located at 2000 Simcoe St North and is considered the 'main' campus. The Faculty of Business and Information Technology (FBIT), the Faculty of Engineering and Applied Science (FEAS), the Faculty of Science (FS), the Faculty of Health Science (FHS), and the Faculty of Graduate Studies are located on the North Campus.

Facilities on the North campus include: the award-winning Campus Library, the Science Building, the Business and Information Technology Building, the Energy Research Centre (ERC)[formerly the Energy Systems and Nuclear Science Research Centre], the Ontario Power Generation (OPG) building, the Automotive Centre of Excellence (ACE), the Software and Informatics Research Centre (SIR), the Campus Recreation and Wellness Centre (CRWC), the University Pavilion (UP), Shawenjigewining Hall (SHA), and student housing. The North campus is co-located with Durham College's campus and both institutions share various facilities including the Campus Library, the CRWC, and various services including parking, security, and IT services. The university has plans in conjunction with Durham College to expand further north in Oshawa over the next few years, on land that they have already purchased. Part of this plan includes the Centre for Cybercrime Research, a university-owned building focusing on research and education in various aspects of cybercrime.

==== Automotive Centre of Excellence ====
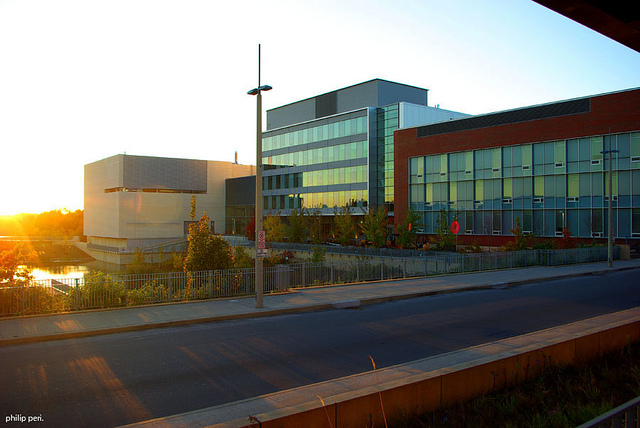
General Motors of Canada Automotive Centre of Excellence

The Automotive Centre of Excellence (ACE) is a multi-level testing and research centre including a five-storey high wind tunnel that allows for climatic, durability, and life cycle testing. It was built by the university in partnership with General Motors (GM) Canada, the Government of Ontario, the Government of Canada and the Partners for the Advancement of Collaborative Engineering Education (PACE). The total cost of the facility was approximately $100 million. It is used by the university for research and education and is also used by GM Canada and its other sponsors for various purposes, including testing new car prototypes. It is divided into two sections: a core research facility (CRF) and an integrated research and training facility (IRTF), with a total area of approximately 16,300 square metres.

The IRTF is the main portion of the building, spanning five floors with space for research and education. This portion of the ACE building is open to university students and is used as a place to study. The CRF, usually referred to as 'the wind tunnel', has full-size chambers for full climatic, structural durability and life cycle testing including a climatic wind tunnel. In this test chamber, wind speeds can exceed 240 kilometres per hour, temperatures range from −40 to +60 °C and relative humidity ranges from 5 to 95 per cent. The climatic wind tunnel has a variable nozzle that can optimize the airflow from 7 to 13 square metres (and larger) as well as a large flexible chassis dynamometer integrated into a 11.5-metre turntable; these allow for vehicles in a wide range of sizes to be tested at various angles of windflow, including crosswind. The chamber also includes a solar array that can replicate the effects of the sun.

==== Energy Research Centre ====
The Energy Research Centre (ERC) is a 9,290-square-metre, with a four-storey facility focusing on clean energy technologies that houses Ontario Tech's nuclear engineering undergraduate program, which is the only program of its kind in Canada. This building is used for research in geothermal, hydraulic, hydrogen, natural gas, nuclear, solar, and wind energy technologies. The ERC is the result of a joint $45.4-million investment from the Government of Canada and the Government of Ontario as part of the Knowledge Infrastructure Program.

The ERC contains a 72-seat lecture theatre, student-study (breakout) rooms, teaching and research labs, and dedicated working stations for graduate students. The building features a glass-covered atrium containing two horse sculptures that pay tribute to the heritage of Windfields Farm: a hanging wire sculpture of the racehorse Northern Dancer, and True Power, a 4.1-metre stainless steel sculpture by Geordie Lishman representing potential energy.

=== Downtown campus ===
The Downtown campus is located in the downtown region of Oshawa, approximately 6.6 km away from the North campus. The Faculty of Social Sciences and Humanities (FSSH) and the Frazer Faculty of Education (FE) are located at the downtown campus.

Facilities at the Downtown campus include: Bordessa Hall, Charles Hall, Regent Theatre, and the Baagwating Indigenous Student Centre (UBISC).

==== Regent Theatre ====
The Regent Theatre is a 609-seat lecture theatre used by the university that, despite being a historic location, is fully outfitted with electric sockets and fold-down side-desks for students' computers. When not in use by the university, the theatre is also rented out for events in the evenings and on weekends, including regular use by the Ontario Philharmonic Orchestra, who hold most of their concerts in the Regent Theatre.

=== Student housing ===
The residences for Ontario Tech are shared by Ontario Tech and Durham College students, as well as Trent University students studying at Trent's Oshawa campus. There are two separate residences on campus: Simcoe Village and South Village. Both of these residences are managed by Campus Living Centres.

=== Sustainability ===
Ontario Tech has many 'green energy' features on campus, including solar panels on the roof of the Promenade, geothermal heating sourced from deep under the Polonsky Commons, and green roofs to reduce heating and cooling costs.

== Administration ==
Ontario Tech University is a publicly funded institution, and operates under a bicameral system with a board of governors and an academic council empowered by provincial legislation, the University of Ontario Institute of Technology Act, 2002.

=== Governance ===
The university's board of governors is charged with the management of the university's affairs, including its assets, properties, and revenue. The board of governors is made up of 25 members, including the university's chancellor, its president and vice-chancellor, three members appointed by the Lieutenant Governor-in-Council, 12 to 16 board-appointed members, and four members who must be students or employees of the universities.

The academic council is responsible for making recommendations to the board of governors concerning the institution's academic policies, as well as making recommendations for the conferment of honorary degrees. The council's ex-officio members include the university's chancellor, president, provost, university librarian, the registrar, its academic administrators, and the deans of the university's faculties. Elected members include members of the university's faculties, its student body, and its administrative staff.

=== Chief officers ===
The university's chief executive officer is the president and vice-chancellor, supervising the administrative and academic direction of the university, its students, and its faculty and staff. The president is appointed by the board, with Steven A. Murphy being the fourth person appointed to the position on 1 March 2018.

The provost is the chief academic officer of the university and advises the president on all academic affairs. They act as the institutional planner and administrator for the university's teaching and research operations, with the deans of each faculty reporting to the provost's office. During a president's absence, they also serve as the acting president of the institution.

The titular head of the institution is the chancellor. However, the role is largely ceremonial, as they are primarily charged with only presiding over the university's convocations to confer degrees on behalf of the institution. The chancellor is appointed by the board on a three-year term, with Mitch Frazer named as the institution's fourth chancellor as of May 2020.

== Academics ==
The university aims to educate its students in a "technology-enriched environment", and offers IT services and leased laptop programs to help support this pedagogy. The university's academic year is organized into three semesters, Fall, Winter, and Spring/Summer.

The university's academic programs are administered by six faculties, the Faculty of Business and Information Technology, the Frazer Faculty of Education, the Faculty of Engineering and Applied Science, the Faculty of Health Science, the Faculty of Science, and the Faculty of Social Science and Humanities. Most faculties are further organized into smaller academic departments and schools. Graduate programs are coordinated by the School of Graduate and Postdoctoral Studies. The university also provides continuing education through its Continuous Learning department. In 2020, the university had a total of 318 instructional faculty members, 264 of whom held either a doctorate, professional degree, or another type of terminal degree.

In 2019, the university conferred 1,755 bachelor's degrees, 124 professional degrees, 227 graduate degrees, and 84 graduate diplomas. More than a third of all graduate degrees conferred by the university was from an engineering-related program.

The university holds membership with several national and international academic postsecondary organizations, such as Universities Canada.

=== Reputation ===
University rankings

World rankings
- THE World: 801-1000
- USNWR World: 1121

Canadian rankings
- THE National: 20–27
- USNWR National: 27
- Maclean's Undergraduate: 9
- Maclean's Reputation: 31

In Maclean's 2023 ranking of Canadian universities, Ontario Tech University placed ninth out of 19 universities in their primarily undergraduate university category, and 31st out of 49 universities in their national reputational survey.

Ontario Tech University has ranked in several international post-secondary school rankings. In the Times Higher Education World University Rankings for 2026, the university was ranked 801-1000 out of 2,191 post-secondary institutions. In U.S. News & World Report 2022–23 global university rankings, the university placed 1121st out of 2,459 schools.

=== Research ===
The university engages in academic research and operates eight research institutes and centres, as well as several research groups. Additionally, the university also operates a joint research facility with the University of Technology Sydney, the Joint Research Centre for AI for Health and Wellness.

As of 2022, 11 faculty members from the university hold Canada Research Chairs. Seven chairholders sit on the Natural Sciences and Engineering Research Council, and two sit on the Canadian Institutes of Health Research and the Social Sciences and Humanities Research Council. In the 2020–21 academic year, the university received 159 research awards and approximately $4.6 million in funding from the Natural Science and Engineering Research Council, 49 research rewards and nearly $2 million in funding from the Social Sciences and Humanities Council, and six research rewards and $433,375 in funding from the Canadian Institute of Health.

In 2020, the university had a sponsored research income of approximately $17.6 million. In the same year, the university's faculty averaged a sponsored research income of $80,900, while graduate students averaged a sponsored research income of $21,700.

=== Admission ===
The requirements for admission differ between students from Ontario, students from other provinces, and students based outside of Canada, due to a lack of uniforming in marking schemes between provinces and countries. In addition to academic requirements, the university also requires applicants whose first language is not English to present proof that they are proficient in the English language.

In 2018, the university reported a retention rate of 81.1 per cent of first year students who advanced onto their second year at the university.

== Student life ==
Demographics of student body (2021–22)
	Undergraduate	Graduate
Male	57.8%	53.1%
Female	42.2%	46.9%
Canadian student	92.2%	66.5%
International student	7.8%	33.5%

In the 2021–22 academic year, the university student body included 10,030 full-time and part-time undergraduate students, and 1,020 full-time and part-time graduate students. The student body is primarily made up of Canadians, with over 90 per cent of the student body holding Canadian citizenship.

=== Organizations ===
The university's student body is represented through the Ontario Tech Student Union (OTSU). The students' union was formed in 2017. Prior to that, the university's student body was represented by a student association that represented the student bodies of Ontario Tech and Durham College. The association's split resulted from a controversy over accountability and student fees between the two student bodies. Services provided by the OTSU includes academic advocacy, legal services, and medical insurance. The student union sanctions several student-run organizations, including clubs based on common interest, and institutional student-run societies for most academic faculties.

The university formally does not grant recognition to any fraternities or sororities, and that they are independent organizations that are not associated or sanctioned with the university. However, there are several fraternities and sororities that operate around the campus. These organizations, some of which are residential and some of which are not, host events for students and do philanthropy work for the surrounding community. Tau Kappa Epsilon has an annual charity event known as "Teke in a box" that raises money for the campus food centre, and Zeta Psi has an annual charity event known as "Zete car push".

The Chronicle is a student newspaper that serves the student bodies of Ontario Tech University and Durham College. The newspaper is produced by Durham College journalist students.

=== Athletics ===
The university's sports teams compete as the Ontario Tech Ridgebacks in U Sports' Ontario University Athletics (OUA) conference. Varsity teams include badminton, basketball, curling, dance, field lacrosse, golf, ice hockey, rowing and soccer. The university's athletic department also maintains sports clubs for cricket, esports, and equestrian.

== Insignias and other representations ==
A former UOIT logo used by the university. The logo was replaced by another UOIT design in 2012.

The Latin name of the university is Universitas Ontario Instituto Technologiae and its motto is Cogitando et Agendo Ducemus, meaning "By thinking and doing we shall lead". Ontario Tech's slogan is "Challenge, Innovate, Connect".

=== Branding ===
The official name of the institution under provincial legislation is the University of Ontario Institute of Technology, and is used in formal documentation issued by the institution, including academic degrees.

However, the university publicly operates under a different name, Ontario Tech University. The institution explored the idea of adopting a new name in 2018, given that the abbreviation 'UOIT' was hard to pronounce and made marketing difficult. The subject became a topic of discussion for months, followed by feedback from both the stakeholders and the school. The operating name was adopted by the university in March 2019, which led to a system-wide revamp in all promotional materials including banners, merchandise, and the website. The change was met with mixed reviews.

=== Coat of arms ===
Coat of arms of Ontario Tech University

Notes
Granted 15 July 2009
Crest
A falcon guardant wings addorsed and inverted Azure holding in its dexter claw a thunderbolt Argent.
Escutcheon
Argent an open book proper bound Azure on a chief indented Azure a canoe inverted Argent.
Supporters
Two thoroughbred horses Azure crined and unguled Argent standing on a grassy mount set with trillium flowers Proper.
Motto
Cogitando Et Agendo Ducemus (By Thinking And Doing We Shall Lead)

== Notable people ==
A number of individuals are associated with the university either as alumni or members of its administration and faculty. As of 2022, there were over 25,500 Ontario Tech alumni. The university operates an alumni association for graduates. Alumni of the university includes Kate Beirness, a television sportscaster, Naheed Dosani, a palliative care physician, and Vijay Thanigasalam, the incumbent Member of Provincial Parliament for Scarborough-Rouge Park. Notable faculty members include Vivian Stamatopoulos, a long-term care advocate, electrical engineer Min Dong, an IEEE Fellow, and Andrea E. Kirkwood, a professor of biology and environmental science known for her work in freshwater ecology and public science communication.

== See also ==
- Higher education in Ontario
- List of universities in Ontario
