= Kilflynn Pearses =

- County: Kerry
- Grounds: Kilflynn

Senior Club Championships
	All Ireland	Munster champions	Kerry champions
Hurling:	0	0	2

Kilflynn Pearses were a hurling team from North County Kerry. They won Kerry Senior Hurling Championships in 1937 & 1938 and were runners up in 1931.

== Honours ==
- Kerry Senior Hurling Championship: (2) 1937, 1938

== County Championship winning captains ==
- 1937: Willie Shanahan
- 1938: John Twomey
