= Tralee Celtic GAA =

Gaelic games club in County Kerry, Ireland

Tralee Celtic
- County: Kerry

Senior Club Championships
	All Ireland	Munster champions	Kerry champions
Hurling:	-	-	2

Tralee Celtic is a former Gaelic Athletic Association club from Tralee in County Kerry in Ireland. The club won two Kerry Senior Hurling Championship titles in 1903 and 1904.
