= Kerry Minor Hurling Championship =

Irish hurling competition

- Irish: Craobh Mionúir Iomána Chiarraí
- Code: Hurling
- Founded: 1947; 79 years ago
- Region: Kerry (GAA)
- Trophy: Seán Lovett Cup
- No. of teams: Various
- Title holders: Ballyduff (12th title)
- Most titles: St Brendan's, Ardfert (14 titles)
- Sponsors: Keane’s SuperValu Killorglin

The Kerry Minor Hurling Championship (known for sponsorship reasons as Keane's SuperValu Killorglin Kerry County Minor Hurling Championship) is an annual hurling competition organised by the Kerry County Board of the Gaelic Athletic Association for the top Under 17 (previously Under 18) hurling teams in the county of Kerry in Ireland. The first championship was held in 1947 and was won by a North Kerry selection comprising players from the Crotta O'Neill's, Lixnaw and Ballyduff clubs.

The series of games are played during the summer months, with the county final usually being played in Austin Stack Park.

A number of championships were awarded by the Co. Board following an objection, often due to the presence of an over-age or illegal player. The ultimate outcome of the 1967 championship is not known with the final subject to Co, Board and Munster Council hearings and appeals. The 1970 championship was unfinished.

== Trophy ==
The Seán Lovett Cup was presented to the championship winners for the first time in 1990, when, perhaps appropriately, Kilmoyley succeeded in retaining the title. This Cup commemorates a great Kilmoyley hurler and club man who also played hurling and football with Kerry from the late 1940s to the 1960s. Previously the Corn Mac Giolla Dia in memory of a former Kerry hurler, Patrick Godley of Ballyheigue, had been awarded to the winners from 1960 onwards. This trophy was presented to the County Board by friends of the late Mr Godley from Chicago.

== Roll of honour ==
#	Team	Wins	Years won	Runner-up	Years runner-up
1	St Brendan's, Ardfert	14	1961, 1962, 1966, 1969, 1981, 1984, 1985, 2002, 2005, 2006, 2011, 2013, 2022, 2023	9	1976, 1977, 1978, 1979, 1989, 2003, 2010, 2015, 2021
2	Kilmoyley	13	1953, 1964, 1978, 1980, 1987, 1989, 1990, 1991, 1993, 1995, 2000, 2007, 2009	10	1958, 1960, 1965, 1982, 1994, 1999, 2004, 2006, 2008, 2012
3	Ballyduff	12	1972, 1973, 1975, 1994, 1996, 1998, 2001, 2003, 2020, 2021, 2024, 2026	9	1969, 1974, 1985, 1993, 2000, 2009, 2019, 2022, 2023
4	Lixnaw	10	1958, 1963, 1965, 1974, 1976, 1997, 2004, 2012, 2014, 2015	6	1956, 1957, 1975, 1983, 2002, 2016
5	Abbeydorney	5	1957, 1971, 1999, 2008, 2018	4	1973, 1995, 1996, 1997
6	Killarney	3	1950, 1951, 1952	2	1953, 1954
6	Ballyheigue	3	1960, 1982, 1992	7	1955, 1980, 1987, 2007, 2011, 2020, 2026
6	Causeway	3	1968, 1977, 1979	8	1972, 1984, 1990, 1991, 1992, 1998, 2001, 2013
6	Kenmare	3	1983, 1988, 2010	1	1986
6	Crotta O'Neill's	3	2016, 2017, 2019	8	1963, 1964, 1968, 1971, 1981, 1988, 2024, 2025
11	St, Patricks (Abbeydorney/Crotta)	2	1954, 1956	0	
11	Austin Stacks	2	1955, 1986	2	1961, 1966
13	North Kerry (Crotta/Lixnaw/Ballyduff)	1	1947		
13	North Kerry Pearses	1	1948	3	1949, 1951, 1952
13	St. Brendan's (Div.) (Ardfert/Ballyheigue)	1	1949	1	1959
13	Kenmare/Kilgarvan	1	1959	2	1947, 1948, 1962
13	Tralee Parnells	1	2025	0	
--	North Kerry (St. Michael's)	0		1	1950
--	Lixnaw/Crotta O'Neill's	0		1	2005
--	South Kerry	0		1	2014
--	Abbeydorney/Tralee Parnells	0		1	2017
--	Ballyheigue/Causeway	0		1	2018

== Finals listed by year ==
Year	Winner	Score	Runner-up	Score	Final date	Final location
2026	Ballyduff	2-11	Ballyheigue	0-08	02/08/2026	Tralee
2025	Tralee Parnells	2-18	Crotta O'Neill's	1-10	03/08/2025	Tralee
2024	Ballyduff	1-17	Crotta O'Neill's	2-10	16/08/2024	Tralee
2023	St Brendan's, Ardfert	2-12	Ballyduff	1-11	28/07/2023	Tralee
2022	St Brendan's, Ardfert	3-13	Ballyduff	1-13	29/07/2022	Tralee
2021	Ballyduff	0-23	St Brendan's, Ardfert	0-10	11/09/2021	Tralee
2020	Ballyduff	1-13	Ballyheigue	1-09	12/09/2020	Tralee
2019	Crotta O'Neill's	1-11	Ballyduff	0-13	25/08/2019	Tralee
2018	Abbeydorney	3-11	Ballyheigue/Causeway	1-16	26/08/2018	Tralee
2017	Crotta O'Neill's	1-14	Abbeydorney/Tralee Parnells	1-13	08/10/2017	Tralee
2016	Crotta O'Neill's	0-11	Lixnaw	0-09	11/09/2016	Tralee
2015	Lixnaw	3-19	St Brendan's, Ardfert	1-10	17/10/2015	Kilmoyley
2014	Lixnaw	3-18	South Kerry	1-09	04/10/2014	Abbeydorney
2013	St. Brendan's, Ardfert	2-15	Causeway	2-04	15/11/2013	Abbeydorney
2012	Lixnaw	0-17	Kilmoyley	0-12	13/10/2012	Tralee
2011	St Brendan's, Ardfert	2-18	Ballyheigue	3-08	16/10/2011	Tralee
2010	Kenmare	1-12	St Brendan's, Ardfert	1-07	10/10/2010	Tralee
2009	Kilmoyley	bt.	Ballyduff		27/09/2009	Tralee
2008	Abbeydorney	1-10	Kilmoyley	0-10	01/11/2008	Ballyheigue
2007	Kilmoyley	3-15	Ballyheigue	1-09	07/10/2007	Tralee
2006	St Brendan's, Ardfert	2-12	Kilmoyley	0-05	07/10/2006	Tralee
2005	St Brendan's, Ardfert	bt.	Lixnaw/Crotta O'Neill's		27/11/2005	
2004	Lixnaw	2-06	Kilmoyley	0-07	03/10/2004	Tralee
2003	Ballyduff	0-11	St Brendan's, Ardfert	2-04	16/11/2003	Tralee
2002	St Brendan's, Ardfert	2-06	Lixnaw	0-09	15/09/2002	Tralee
2001	Ballyduff	2-09	Causeway	1-03	30/09/2001	Tralee
2000	Kilmoyley	2-08	Ballyduff	1-06	15/10/2000	Killarney
1999	Abbeydorney	1-10	Kilmoyley	0-06	03/10/1999	Tralee
1998	Ballyduff	2-15	Causeway	3-01	18/10/1998	Tralee
1997	Lixnaw	0-08	Abbeydorney	0-05	21/09/1997	Tralee
1996	Ballyduff	2-07	Abbeydorney	0-02	14/09/1996	Tralee
1995	Kilmoyley	1-08	Abbeydorney	0-05	01/10/1995	Tralee
1994	Ballyduff	2-09	Kilmoyley	1-05	25/09/1994	Tralee
1993	Kilmoyley	0-12	Ballyduff	1-06	27/08/1993	Tralee
1992	Ballyheigue	2-08	Causeway	0-01	20/09/1992	Tralee
1991	Kilmoyley	3-07	Causeway	3-06	08/09/1991	Tralee
1990	Kilmoyley	2-16	Causeway	3-01	10/09/1990	Causeway
1989	Kilmoyley	6-09	St Brendan's, Ardfert	3-05	10/09/1989	Tralee
1988	Kenmare	4-11	Crotta O'Neill's	0-05	11/09/1988	Tralee
1987	Kilmoyley	5-08	Ballyheigue	2-04	13/09/1987	Tralee
1986	Austin Stacks	1-07	Kenmare	0-08	12/10/1986	Killarney
1985	St Brendan's, Ardfert	3-13	Ballyduff	1-07	08/09/1985	Tralee
1984	St Brendan's, Ardfert	0-11	Causeway	0-05	14/10/1984	Tralee
1983	Kenmare	5-05	Lixnaw	2-02	16/10/1983	Milltown
1982	Ballyheigue	(Rep.) 0-05 (Draw) 0-06	Kilmoyley	(Rep.) 0-02 (Draw) 0-06	14/11/1982	Abbeydorney
1981	St Brendan's, Ardfert	3-06	Crotta O'Neill's	1-02	13/09/1981	Tralee
1980	Kilmoyley	(Rep.) 5-05 (Draw) 2-08	Ballyheigue	(Rep.) 2-02 (Draw) 4-02	28/09/1980	Abbeydorney
1979	Causeway	1-09	St Brendan's, Ardfert	1-05	23/09/1979	Abbeydorney
1978	Kilmoyley	1-03	St Brendan's, Ardfert	0-02	17/09/1978	Tralee
1977	Causeway	3-05	St Brendan's, Ardfert	1-02	18/09/1977	Tralee
1976	Lixnaw	(Rep.) 5-10 (Draw) 1-11	St Brendan's, Ardfert	(Rep.) 1-03 (Draw) 2-08	17/10/1976	Tralee
1975	Ballyduff	3-12	Lixnaw	1-04	12/10/1975	Tralee
1974	Lixnaw	4-02	Ballyduff	0-05	06/10/1974	Abbeydorney
1973	Ballyduff	5-15	Abbeydorney	0-02	14/10/1973	Tralee
1972	Ballyduff	1-13	Causeway	0-06	10/09/1972	Tralee
1971	Abbeydorney	4-10	Crotta O'Neill's	4-04	31/10/1971	Tralee
1970	Not completed					
1969	St Brendan's, Ardfert	(Rep.) 4-02 (Draw) 3-01	Ballyduff	(Rep.) 0-02 (Draw) 3-01	30/11/1969	Tralee
1968	Causeway (Awarded by Co. Board)		Crotta O'Neill's			
1967	Austin Stacks (Awarded by Co. Board but Causeway appeal to Munster Council was allowed)	6-01	Causeway	5-04	26/11/1967	Tralee
1966	St Brendan's, Ardfert	3-04	Austin Stacks	1-01	13/11/1966	Tralee
1965	Lixnaw (Awarded by Co. Board)		Kilmoyley			
1964	Kilmoyley	2-09	Crotta O'Neill's	4-02	06/09/1964	Tralee
1963	Lixnaw	5-05	Crotta O'Neill's	4-03	27/10/1963	Tralee
1962	St Brendan's, Ardfert	3-06	Kenmare/Kilgarvan	1-05	02/09/1962	Tralee
1961	St Brendan's, Ardfert	6-06	Austin Stacks	7-02	03/09/1961	Tralee
1960	Ballyheigue	6-05	Kilmoyley	4-00	28/08/1960	Tralee
1959	Kenmare/Kilgarvan	3-05	St Brendan's	3-02	03/09/1959	Tralee
1958	Lixnaw	2-07	Kilmoyley	0-01	05/10/1958	Tralee
1957	Abbeydorney	5-09	Lixnaw	0-01	22/09/1957	Ardfert
1956	St, Patrick's (Abbeydorney/Crotta O'Neill's)	7-03	Lixnaw	7-02	14/10/1956	Tralee
1955	Austin Stacks	9-04	Ballyheigue	2-02	04/09/1955	Tralee
1954	St. Patrick's (Abbeydorney/Crotta O'Neill's)	5-05	Killarney	1-00	07/11/1954	Tralee
1953	Kilmoyley	10-04	Killarney	2-03		
1952	Killarney	6-03	Pearses	1-02	21/08/1952	Tralee
1951	Killarney	4-02	Pearses	1-01	30/08/1951	Tralee
1950	Killarney	3-03	North Kerry (St. Michael's)	2-01	01/10/1950	Tralee
1949	St Brendan's (St Brendan's, Ardfert/Ballyheigue) (Awarded by Co. Board)		Pearses (Causeway/Ballyduff/Kilmoyley)		25/09/1949	Abbeydorney
1948	North Kerry Pearse's (Awarded by Co. Board)		Kenmare/Kilgarvan		16/05/1948	Killarney
1947	North Kerry (Crotta O'Neill's/Lixnaw/Ballyduff)	4-02	Kenmare/Kilgarvan	1-04	12/10/1947	Kenmare
