= Jerry Molyneaux (sports administrator) =

Personal information
- Native name: Diarmuid Ó Maolagáin (Irish)
- Born: October 1955 Knockaderry, County Limerick, Ireland
- Died: 26 July 2016 (aged 60) Limerick, Ireland

Sport
- Sport: Hurling
Inter-county management
- Years: Team
- 2004–2006: Kerry
	0	0	0

Jerry Molyneaux (October 1955 – 26 July 2016) was an Irish Gaelic games administrator. His career included almost every role in Gaelic football and hurling, including player, coach, manager, selector, chairman, secretary, PRO, and referee.

== Honours ==
=== Management ===
Granagh-Ballingarry

- Limerick Junior Hurling Championship (1): 1998
- West Limerick Junior Hurling Championship (1): 1998

Glin

- Limerick Under-21 Football Championship (1)

Newmarket

- Ducon Cup (1)

Lixnaw

- Kerry Senior Hurling Championship (1): 1999
