= Steven A. Murphy =

Canadian academic and university administrator

Steven A. Murphy is a Canadian academic and university administrator. He is the fourth President and Vice-Chancellor of Ontario Tech University. Murphy previously served as Dean of the Ted Rogers School of Management at Toronto Metropolitan University. He is currently a member of the National Research Council of Canada and chair of Ontario University Athletics.

== Early life and education ==
Murphy was born and raised in Ottawa and went to Ridgemont High School. Having grown up in a family of construction entrepreneurs inspired his educational path. He has a Bachelor of Commerce (Honours) in Human Resource Management, a Master in Management Studies (with Distinction) in the Management of Technology and a Doctorate in Management, Organizational Behaviour from Carleton University.

== Administrative leadership ==
Murphy took up the position of President and Vice-Chancellor at Ontario Tech University (UOIT) on March 1, 2018. He plans on positioning the university as "one of the great technological universities," he told Maclean's magazine. Top of his agenda are a rebranding campaign and creating a student-friendly "sticky campus." He told Global News he planned on expanding work-integrated learning (WIL) opportunities at the university.

Murphy served as Dean of the Ted Rogers School of Management at Ryerson University between 2013 and 2017. He was lauded for creating the largest co-op program in the country, and assembling a diverse advisory board for the school. Prior to that, he held several academic and administrative roles at Carleton University's Sprott School of Business, including Associate Dean, Research and External, Associate Dean, Research and Graduate Studies, Assistant, and associate professor.

== Research ==
Murphy's research focuses on organizational behaviour. He has more than 110 papers, book chapters and technical reports published to his name.

== Honours and awards ==
Murphy has received several awards including:

- Professional Excellence Award by Carleton University's Sprott School of Business, 2018
- Research Achievement Award, Carleton University, 2011
- Provost and vice-president (Academic) Award, Carleton University, 2007
- Teaching Achievement Award, Carleton University, 2007
