= 1985 Kerry County Council election =

Part of the 1985 Irish local elections

- 20 June 1985

All 27 seats on Kerry County Council
	First party	Second party	Third party
Party	Fianna Fáil	Fine Gael	Labour
Seats won	13	7	3
Seat change	▼1	Steady	▲1
	Fourth party
Party	Independent
Seats won	4
Seat change	▲2
- Area of Kerry County Council

An election to Kerry County Council took place on 20 June 1985 as part of that year's Irish local elections. 27 councillors were elected from five local electoral areas (LEAs) for a five-year term of office on the electoral system of proportional representation by means of the single transferable vote (PR-STV). This term was extended for a further year, to 1991.

== Results by party ==
Party	Seats	±	First Pref. votes	FPv%	±%
Fianna Fáil	13	▼1	30,011	46.72	▲2.02
Fine Gael	7	Steady	15,401	23.98	▼4.07
Labour	3	▲1	7,095	11.05	▼1.44
Sinn Féin	0	▼1	3,381	5.26	▲0.11
Workers' Party	0	Steady	1,569	2.44	▲0.55
Independent	4	▲2	6,776	10.55	▲2.82
Totals	27	▲1	64,233	100.00	

== Results by local electoral area ==
=== Killarney ===
Killarney: 6 seats
Party	Candidate	FPv%	Count							
Party	Candidate	FPv%	1	2	3	4	5	6	7	8
Fianna Fáil	John O'Leary TD	16.64%	2,504							
Fianna Fáil	Tom Fleming*	15.80%	2,377							
Fianna Fáil	Jackie Healy-Rae*	14.71%	2,213							
Labour	Michael Gleeson*	11.49%	1,729	1,756	1,773	1,780	1,887	2,021	2,159	
Fianna Fáil	P.J. Cronin*	8.39%	1,262	1,462	1,582	1,609	1,647	1,676	1,802	2,057
Fine Gael	Thomas Dennehy	7.11%	1,070	1,083	1,123	1,125	1,231	1,416	1,472	1,574
Fine Gael	Christy McSweeney*	6.77%	1,018	1,035	1,055	1,059	1,233	1,474	1,557	1,805
Workers' Party	Sean O'Grady	6.56%	987	1,029	1,037	1,044	1,105	1,139	1,343	
Independent	Redmond Sullivan	4.45%	670	699	714	719	741	779		
Fine Gael	Tom Randles	4.15%	625	635	638	647	712			
Fine Gael	Paudie O'Connor*	3.94%	593	609	613	615				
Electorate: 19,651 Valid: 15,048 (76.58%) Spoilt: 178 (1.17%) Quota: 2,150 Turnout: 15,226 (77.48%)

=== Killorglin ===
Killorglin: 6 seats
Party	Candidate	FPv%	Count									
Party	Candidate	FPv%	1	2	3	4	5	6	7	8	9	10
Fianna Fáil	John O'Donoghue*	17.00%	2,215									
Fine Gael	Michael Connor-Scarteen*	11.81%	1,539	1,542	1,543	1,547	1,566	1,637	1,964			
Fianna Fáil	Thomas Cahill*	10.27%	1,338	1,403	1,425	1,448	1,487	1,530	1,895			
Fine Gael	Danny Kissane*	9.93%	1,293	1,296	1,319	1,347	1,365	1,505	1,513	1,521	1,577	1,627
Fine Gael	Dan Barry	9.45%	1,231	1,304	1,306	1,308	1,346	1,512	1,525	1,532	2,012	
Independent	Michael Ahern	8.61%	1,122	1,135	1,154	1,206	1,267	1,395	1,411	1,419	1,657	1,738
Fianna Fáil	Teddy O'Connor*	7.60%	990	1,051	1,063	1,076	1,118	1,168	1,310	1,354	1,468	1,488
Independent	Michael O'Connell*	7.10%	925	979	989	1,000	1,113	1,219	1,241	1,277		
Fianna Fáil	Jackie Cahill	6.83%	890	931	938	939	961	981				
Labour	Michael Doyle	5.50%	717	740	748	764	801					
Sinn Féin	Dave O'Shea	1.96%	255	259	261	270						
Sinn Féin	Derek McKenna	1.67%	217	228	230	231						
Workers' Party	Paddy Callaghan	1.30%	169	170	177							
Independent	Dan O'Connor	0.96%	125	127								
Electorate: 17,751 Valid: 13,026 (73.38%) Spoilt: 165 (1.25%) Quota: 1,861 Turnout: 13,191 (74.31%)

=== Listowel ===
Listowel: 6 seats
Party	Candidate	FPv%	Count				
Party	Candidate	FPv%	1	2	3	4	5
Fine Gael	Sen. Jimmy Deenihan	20.27%	3,123				
Fianna Fáil	Dan Kiely*	15.99%	2,463				
Fianna Fáil	Eamonn Walsh*	12.23%	1,884	2,008	2,127	2,195	2,553
Fianna Fáil	Noel Brassil*	12.00%	1,849	1,872	1,910	1,916	2,154
Fine Gael	Eamonn Barry	11.24%	1,731	2,216			
Labour	John Joe O'Sullivan	11.00%	1,694	1,764	1,777	2,055	2,130
Sinn Féin	Jerry Walsh*	9.56%	1,473	1,562	1,588	1,673	1,747
Fianna Fáil	Jack Stack	4.73%	728	795	849	868	
Labour	Con Scanlon	3.00%	462	525	536		
Electorate: 20,984 Valid: 15,407 (73.42%) Spoilt: 166 (1.07%) Quota: 2,202 Turnout: 15,573 (74.21%)

=== Mid-Kerry ===
Mid-Kerry: 5 seats
Party	Candidate	FPv%	Count						
Party	Candidate	FPv%	1	2	3	4	5	6	7
Fianna Fáil	Tom McEllistrim, Jnr TD	19.89%	2,239						
Independent	James Courtney*	15.57%	1,753	1,779	1,912				
Fine Gael	Michael Begley TD*	12.75%	1,436	1,439	1,463	1,660	1,665	2,369	
Independent	Breandán Mac Gearailt*	11.80%	1,329	1,335	1,401	1,467	1,484	1,547	1,666
Fianna Fáil	Thomas Fitzgerald*	11.08%	1,248	1,313	1,358	1,408	1,414	1,439	1,483
Fianna Fáil	Michael Long*	8.54%	961	1,150	1,237	1,342	1,346	1,638	1,764
Fine Gael	Bobby O'Connell	8.46%	953	977	1,012	1,310	1,313		
Labour	Michael Moynihan TD	6.96%	784	805	873				
Sinn Féin	Matt Lee	4.94%	556	584					
Electorate: 15,376 Valid: 11,259 (73.22%) Spoilt: 106 (0.93%) Quota: 1,877 Turnout: 11,365 (73.91%)

=== Tralee ===
Tralee: 4 seats
Party	Candidate	FPv%	Count					
Party	Candidate	FPv%	1	2	3	4	5	6
Fianna Fáil	Denis Foley TD*	32.67%	3,101					
Labour	Meave Spring	18.00%	1,709	1,872	1,964			
Fianna Fáil	Ted Fitzgerald	12.03%	1,142	1,575	1,670	1,680	1,808	2,379
Sinn Féin	Sean O'Callaghan	9.27%	880	971	1,060	1,071	1,101	1,175
Independent	John Blennerhassett*	8.98%	852	974	1,059	1,081	1,519	1,686
Fine Gael	Sean Shanahan	8.31%	789	827	852	863		
Fianna Fáil	Pauline Fuller*	6.39%	607	879	904	914	995	
Workers' Party	Donal Tobin	4.35%	413	496				
Electorate: 14,535 Valid: 9,493 (65.31%) Spoilt: 124 (1.29%) Quota: 1,899 Turnout: 9,617 (66.16%)
