= Banna GAA =

Gaelic games club in County Kerry, Ireland

Banna
- Founded: 1891
- County: Kerry
- Colours: Black and white
- Grounds: Banna

Playing kits
Standard colours

Senior Club Championships
	All Ireland	Munster champions	Kerry champions
Hurling:	0	0	1

Banna GAA was a hurling club from north County Kerry, Ireland. The club won one Kerry Senior Hurling Championship in 1940 when they beat Dingle in the final on a scoreline of 5-03 to 2-03. The club was eventually disbanded after they combined with Ardfert to create St Brendan's Hurling Club in the 1960s.
