= Ballyduff =

Ballyduff may refer to:

== In the Republic of Ireland ==
- Ballyduff, County Kerry, a village near Listowel
- Ballyduff, County Waterford, a village near Lismore
- Ballyduff, County Wexford, a village and townland near Ferns
- Ballyjamesduff, County Cavan, a town, often called Ballyduff for short

== In Canada ==
- A community in Manvers Township, Ontario
