= 1996 Kerry Senior Hurling Championship =

- Teams: 11
- Sponsor: AIB
- Champions: Ballyheigue (3rd title); Patrick O'Mahony (captain)
- Runners-up: Ballyduff

The 1996 Kerry Senior Hurling Championship was the 95th staging of the Kerry Senior Hurling Championship since its establishment by the Kerry County Board in 1889.

Ballyduff were the defending champions.

The final was played on 8 September 1996 at Austin Stack Park in Tralee, between Ballyheigue and Ballyduff, in what was their second meeting in the final overall and a second consecutive meeting. Ballyheigue won the match by 2–09 to 0–07 to claim their third championship title overall and a first title in four years.
