= St Patrick's GAA (Kerry) =

Gaelic games club in County Kerry, Ireland

St Patrick's East Kerry
- Founded: 1982
- County: Kerry
- Colours: Black and white

Playing kits
Standard colours

St Patrick's are a Gaelic Athletic Association hurling club in East County Kerry, Ireland. They draw their players mainly from Killarney, Rathmore, Killorglin, St Mary's and Spa/ Glenflesk. A one time senior club they now play in the Junior Championship and the Junior County League Division 3.

== Honours ==
- Kerry Intermediate Hurling Championship: (2) 1983, 1990
- Kerry Junior Hurling Championship: (4) 2007, 2010, 2013, 2014
- Kerry Novice Hurling Championship: (1) 2004
- Kerry Hurling League Div 2: (1) 1985
