= Kilgarvan GAA =

Gaelic games club in County Kerry, Ireland

Kilgarvan
- Cill Gharbháin
- Founded: 1889
- County: Kerry
- Colours: Red & White
- Grounds: Clontoo
- Coordinates: 51°54′14.54″N 9°26′57.24″W

Playing kits
Standard colours

Senior Club Championships
	All Ireland	Munster champions	Kerry champions
Hurling:	-	-	3

Kilgarvan is a Gaelic Athletic Association club in Kilgarvan, County Kerry, Ireland. They play in the Intermediate Hurling Championship and Division 2 county league. Kilgarvan play football in Division 5 of the county league and in the Kenmare District Board championship and County Novice Championship.

== History ==
The club was founded in 1889. It was one of the five founding clubs of competitive hurling in Kerry. In 1889 Kilgarvan was one of five clubs who competed in the first Kerry Senior Hurling Championship. Kilgarvan won three Kerry Senior Hurling Championship in 1953, 1956 and 1958. In 2007 Kilgarvan became the first Kerry club to win a Munster Hurling club game when they beat Caherline from Limerick in the Quarter-final of the Munster Junior Club Hurling Championship on a scoreline of 2-11 to 2-09. Later they were then beaten by Moyle Rovers 2-17 to 4-05 in the semi-final. In 2008 made more history by becoming the first Kerry club to make it to a Munster Final when they made the Munster Junior Club Hurling Championship Final, however they lost out to Cork side Dripsey on a scoreline of 2-11 to 1-03.

== Honours ==
=== Hurling ===
- Munster Junior Club Hurling Championship: Runners-up 2008
- Kerry Senior Hurling Championship: (3) 1953, 1956, 1958
- Kerry Intermediate Hurling Championship: (12) 1972, 1981, 1982, 1984, 2006, 2007, 2009, 2010, 2018, 2019, 2022, 2024
- Kerry Junior Hurling Championship: (1) 2005
- Kerry Under-21 hurling championship: (4) 1972, 1987, 1988, 1989, (with Kenamre) 2019 (with Kenmare/Dr. Crokes)
- Kerry Minor Hurling Championship: (3) 1959, 1983, 2010 (with Kenmare)
- Kerry Senior Hurling League Division 2: (5) 2001, 2005, 2006, 2007, 2019
- Kerry Senior Hurling League Division 3: (2) 1994, 2007
- South Kerry Senior Hurling Championship: (11) 1999, 2003, 2006, 2007, 2008, 2009, 2010, 2014, 2016, 2018, 2019
- South Kerry Senior Hurling League: (6) 2002, 2003, 2005, 2006, 2007, 2014
- South Kerry Junior Hurling Championship: (4) 2003, 2005, 2006, 2012
- South Kerry Junior Hurling League: (2) 2006, 2007

=== Football ===
- Munster Junior B Football Championship: (2) 2018, 2023
- Kerry Novice Football Championship: (2) 2018, 2022
- Kerry Novice Shield 2: (2) 1999, 2001
- Kenmare District Board Senior Championship (Finnegan Cup): (1) 1961
- Kenmare District Board Intermediate Championship (Murphy Cup): (1) 2003
- Kenmare District Board Junior Championship (Purcell Cup): (2) 1991, 1998
- Kenmare District Board Senior League (Spillane Cup): (1) 1983

=== County Championship Winning Captions ===
- 1953: Ritchie Purcell
- 1956: Paudie Healy
- 1958: Denis Hegarty
