= Kerry Under-21 Hurling Championship =

Irish hurling competition

- Irish: Craobh Iomána Faoi-21 Chiarraí
- Code: Hurling
- Founded: 1979; 47 years ago
- Region: Kerry (GAA)
- Trophy: Atlantic Oils Perpetual Cup
- No. of teams: Various
- Title holders: St Brendan's, Ardfert (11th title)
- Most titles: St Brendan's, Ardfert (11 titles)
- Sponsors: Ask Acorn

The Kerry Under-21 Hurling Championship (known for sponsorship reasons as the Ask Acorn Kerry County Under-21 Hurling Championship) is an annual hurling competition organised by the Kerry County Board of the Gaelic Athletic Association for the top Under-21 hurling teams in the county of Kerry in Ireland.

The first County Championship at this age grade took place in 1979 and was won by Causeway. Prior to this, Under-21 championships were held at divisional level only.

The series of games are played during the autumn and winter months. Weather conditions and fixture congestion have, on a number of occasions, led to the final stages of the competition not being completed within the calendar year.

The 2009 competition does not appear to have been completed, with the final (due to be contested between St Brendan's, Ardfert and Kilmoyley) unplayed. The 2020 and 2021 competitions were not commenced due to the impact of the COVID-19 pandemic on Gaelic games.

== Trophy ==
The original Atlantic Oils Perpetual Cup was presented to the winners from 1979 until 2007. The original trophy was replaced in 2008 when a new trophy was presented by Brendan Horgan of Atlantic Oils to the Kerry County Board . This trophy is sometimes referred to as the Denis Horgan Cup in memory of the founder of the Atlantic Oils company.

== Roll of honour ==
#	Team	Wins	Years won	Runner-up	Years runner-up
1	St Brendan's, Ardfert	11	1982, 1983, 1984, 1985, 1986, 2005, 2007, 2008, 2024, 2025, 2026	9	1980, 1981, 1987, 2003, 2006, 2013, 2014, 2016, 2023
2	Ballyheigue	6	1980, 1991, 1994, 1995, 1996, 1997	2	1982, 2025
2	Kilmoyley	6	1981, 1990, 1993, 1998, 2006, 2011	5	1985, 1988, 1991, 1992, 2004
4	Lixnaw	5	1999, 2002, 2003, 2004, 2016	8	1979, 1997, 1998, 2000, 2005, 2007, 2018, 2019
4	Ballyduff	5	2000, 2001, 2010, 2013, 2023	5	1983, 1989, 1995, 1996, 2026
6	Causeway	3	1979, 2014, 2017	3	2002, 2010, 2012
6	Kenmare	3	1987, 1988, 1989	3	1984, 1986, 1999
6	Crotta O'Neill's	3	1992, 2018, 2022	4	1993, 1994, 2008, 2017
9	Abbeydorney / Crotta O'Neill's	1	2012	1	1990 (as St. Bernard's)
9	Causeway / Ballyduff	1	2015	0	
9	Kilgarvan / Kenmare / Dr.Crokes	1	2019	0	
-	Abbeydorney			2	2001, 2022
-	Kenmare / Kilgarvan			1	2011
-	Abbeydorney / Ballyheigue			1	2015
-	Crotta O'Neill's/Kilmoyley			1	2024

== Finals listed by year ==
Year	Winner	Score	Runner-up	Score	Final date	Final location
2026	St Brendan's, Ardfert	4-16	Ballyduff	2-16	24/10/2026	Austin Stack Park, Tralee
2025	St Brendan's, Ardfert	2-16	Ballyheigue	1-13	08/11/2025	Austin Stack Park, Tralee
2024	St Brendan's, Ardfert	1-11	Crotta O'Neill's/Kilmoyley	0-13	08/12/2024	Austin Stack Park, Tralee
2023	Ballyduff	5-09	St Brendan's, Ardfert	1-11	12/11/2023	Austin Stack Park, Tralee
2022	Crotta O'Neill's	1-21	Abbeydorney	0-18	17/09/2022	Austin Stack Park, Tralee
2021	Competition cancelled due to the impact of the COVID-19 pandemic on Gaelic games					
2020	Competition cancelled due to the impact of the COVID-19 pandemic on Gaelic games					
2019	Kilgarvan / Kenmare / Dr.Crokes	2-16	Lixnaw	1-14	28/10/2019	Austin Stack Park, Tralee
2018	Crotta O'Neills	0-13	Lixnaw	0-11	13/10/2018	Austin Stack Park, Tralee
2017	Causeway	1-12	Crotta O'Neills	0-10	11/11/2017	Austin Stack Park, Tralee
2016	Lixnaw	3-15	St Brendan's, Ardfert	1-12	15/10/2016	Abbeydorney
2015	Causeway / Ballyduff	2-17	Abbeydorney / Ballyheigue	3-08	07/11/2015	Lerrig
2014	Causeway	0-18	St Brendan's, Ardfert	0-09	14/12/2014	Austin Stack Park, Tralee
2013	Ballyduff	1-10	St Brendan's, Ardfert	0-11	21/12/2013	Austin Stack Park, Tralee
2012	Abbeydorney / Crotta O'Neill's	3-06	Causeway	0-11	03/11/2012	Austin Stack Park, Tralee
2011	Kilmoyley	1-09	Kenmare / Kilgarvan	0-09	03/12/2011	Austin Stack Park, Tralee
2010	Ballyduff	1-08	Causeway	0-10	05/12/2010	Lerrig
2009	Not completed					
2008	St Brendan's, Ardfert	0-18	Crotta O'Neill's	0-08	21/12/2008	Ballyheigue
2007	St Brendan's, Ardfert	0-12	Lixnaw	0-03	02/12/2007	Ballyheigue
2006	Kilmoyley	1-11	St Brendan's, Ardfert	0-12	24/03/2007	Austin Stack Park, Tralee
2005	St Brendan's, Ardfert	4-11	Lixnaw	1-07	26/03/2006	Austin Stack Park, Tralee
2004	Lixnaw	2-13	Kilmoyley	1-06	06/11/2004	Austin Stack Park, Tralee
2003	Lixnaw	3-13	St Brendan's, Ardfert	1-07	19/10/2003	Austin Stack Park, Tralee
2002	Lixnaw	0-10	Causeway	1-04	13/10/2002	Austin Stack Park, Tralee
2001	Ballyduff	2-16	Abbeydorney	1-04	06/08/2001	Lerrig
2000	Ballyduff	w/o.	Lixnaw	scr.		
1999	Lixnaw	2-16	Kenmare	0-03	13/11/1999	Fitzgerald Stadium, Killarney
1998	Kilmoyley	2-09	Lixnaw	2-05	14/11/1998	Ballyheigue
1997	Ballyheigue	w/o.	Lixnaw	scr.		
1996	Ballyheigue	1-11	Ballyduff	1-04	17/11/1996	Causeway
1995	Ballyheigue	2-08	Ballyduff	2-03	10/12/1995	Austin Stack Park, Tralee
1994	Ballyheigue	2-13	Crotta O'Neill's	2-06	02/10/1994	Austin Stack Park, Tralee
1993	Kilmoyley	4-07	Crotta O'Neill's	1-14	21/11/1993	Austin Stack Park, Tralee
1992	Crotta O'Neill's	1-09	Kilmoyley	1-07	14/12/1992	Ardfert
1991	Ballyheigue	3-02	Kilmoyley	1-07	08/12/1991	Ardfert
1990	Kilmoyley	2-10	St Bernard's (Abbeydorney / Crotta O'Neill's)	1-08	11/11/1990	Causeway (2 replays required).
1989	Kenmare	2-07	Ballyduff	0-04	24/09/1989	Fitzgerald Stadium, Killarney
1988	Kenmare	2-07	Kilmoyley	1-04	02/10/1988	Fitzgerald Stadium, Killarney
1987	Kenmare	3-08	St Brendan's, Ardfert	2-07	01/11/1987	Fitzgerald Stadium, Killarney
1986	St Brendan's, Ardfert	5-07	Kenmare	0-08	05/10/1986	Fitzgerald Stadium, Killarney
1985	St Brendan's, Ardfert	1-07	Kilmoyley	0-05	22/12/1985	Ballyheigue
1984	St Brendan's, Ardfert	0-08	Kenmare	0-02	30/09/1984	Fitzgerald Stadium, Killarney
1983	St Brendan's, Ardfert	0-19	Ballyduff	1-08	11/09/1983	Austin Stack Park, Tralee
1982	St Brendan's, Ardfert	2-11	Ballyheigue	4-03	26/09/1982	Hermitage Park, Lixnaw
1981	Kilmoyley	2-06	St Brendan's, Ardfert	1-06	30/08/1981	Austin Stack Park, Tralee
1980	Ballyheigue	2-04	St Brendan's, Ardfert	1-03	26/10/1980	Abbeydorney
1979	Causeway	2-09	Lixnaw	0-07	21/10/1979	Austin Stack Park, Tralee
