= Causeway, County Kerry =

Causeway An Tóchar
- Village
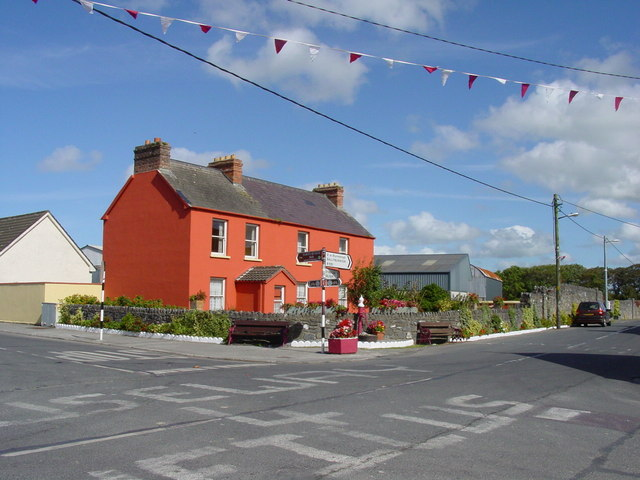
- Crossroads at Causeway, County Kerry

- Location in Ireland
- Coordinates: 52°24′52″N 09°43′59″W
- Country: Ireland
- Province: Munster
- County: County Kerry
- Elevation: 22 m (72 ft)

Population (2022)
  - Total: 220

Causeway (Irish: an Tóchar / Ceann an Tóchair, historically anglicised as Kantogher) is a village in County Kerry in Ireland. In the village there is one shop/post office, two hairdressers, a fast food outlet, a funeral home, a bakery and four pubs. Other amenities in the area include a GAA pitch, health centre, church, primary school, and a secondary school.

== Education ==
Causeway Comprehensive School is a co-educational school offering a complete second-level education to pupils from Kerryhead to Lisselton and from Ardfert to Dromclough.

== Geography ==
Causeway is approximately 16 miles (26 km) from Tralee on the R551 regional road. Causeway Parish is bordered to the south by Ardfert/Kilmoyley, to the west by Ballyheigue and to the northeast Ballyduff. To the north is the Shannon Estuary and the cliffs of Meenogahane.

== History ==
"An Tóchar" is Irish for "(the) causeway". The village was founded on an ancient Celtic roadway which originated in the neighbouring parish of Ballyheigue and was reputed to have ended in Tara, seat of the High-Kings of Ireland.

Shannonside Local Radio operated from Causeway from May, 1987 to May, 1988.

According to 2022 census figures, the population of Causeway was 220, a decrease from the 257 inhabitants recorded in the 2016 census.

== See also ==
- List of towns and villages in Ireland
