= Causeway GAA =

Gaelic games club in County Kerry, Ireland

Causeway G.A.A.
- An Tóchar / C.L.G. An Tóchair
- Founded: 1892
- County: Kerry
- Colours: Maroon and White
- Grounds: Causeway
- Coordinates: 52°24′38.38″N 9°44′12.16″W

Playing kits
Standard colours

Senior Club Championships
	All Ireland	Munster champions	Kerry champions
Hurling:	-	-	9

Causeway GAA is a hurling team in Ireland.

== Honours ==
- Kerry Senior Hurling Championship (9): 1932, 1979, 1980, 1981, 1982, 1987, 1998, 2019, 2022
- Kerry Intermediate Hurling Championship (1): 2021
- Kerry Junior Hurling Championship (1): 2021
- Kerry Minor Hurling Championship (2) 1968, 1977
- Kerry Under-21 hurling championship (4) 1979, 2014. 2015, 2017
- North Kerry Senior Hurling Championship (3) 1988, 2003, 2010

== County Championship Winning captains ==
- 1932: Neilus Flynn
- 1979: Roger Hussey
- 1980: Roy Dineen
- 1981: Maurice Leahy
- 1982: Gerald O'Grady
- 1987: Anthony O'Connor
- 1998: Maurice O'Carroll
- 2019: Muiris Delaney
- 2022: Jason Diggins

== Notable players ==
- Maurice Leahy
- Keith Carmody
- John Mike Dooley
- Neilus Flynn
