= 2026 Joe McDonagh Cup =

Irish inter-county hurling competition

Joe McDonagh Cup 2026
- Corn Sheosaimh Mhic Dhonnacha

Tournament details
- Level: 2
- Year: 2026
- Trophy: Joe McDonagh Cup
- Dates: 18 April - 6 June 2026
- Teams: 6

Winners
- Champions: Laois (2nd win)
- Manager: Tommy Fitzgerald
- Captain: David Dooley
- Qualify for: Joe McDonagh Cup Final

Runners-up
- Runners-up: Carlow
- Manager: Pat Bennett
- Captain: Chris Nolan

Promotion/Relegation
- Promoted team(s): Laois
- Relegated team(s): London

The 2026 Joe McDonagh Cup was the ninth staging of the Joe McDonagh Cup since its establishment by the Gaelic Athletic Association in 2018.

The top two teams from the round robin stage - Laois and Carlow — played off in a final to decide the winner but unlike previous years, the two finalists did not advance to All-Ireland preliminary quarter-finals, which were scrapped this year. The final was won by Laois, who will consequently play in Leinster Senior Hurling Championship in 2027. The bottom team, London, are relegated to the Christy Ring Cup.

As part of the same changes which scrapped the preliminary quarter-finals, a semi-final between the second and third-placed teams will be introduced in 2027's edition of the competition.

== Team Changes ==
=== To Championship ===
Relegated from the Leinster Senior Hurling Championship

- Antrim

Promoted from the Christy Ring Cup

- London

=== From Championship ===
Promoted to the All-Ireland Senior Hurling Championship

- Kildare

Relegated to the Christy Ring Cup

- Kerry

== Format ==
=== Cup Format ===
Initially each of the six teams played the other five teams in single round-robin matches. The top two teams after the round robin games competed in the Joe McDonagh Cup final.

==== Promotion ====
With the relegation of Kerry in 2025 to the 2026 Christy Ring Cup, no Munster team is taking part in 2026 so the champions will be automatically promoted to next year's Leinster Championship.

==== Relegation ====
The bottom-placed team in the Joe McDonagh Cup — London — will be automatically relegated to next year's Christy Ring Cup, to be replaced by the Christy Ring Cup winner.

=== Teams by province ===
The participating teams, listed by province, with numbers in parentheses indicating final positions in the 2026 National Hurling League before the championship were:

Britain

- London (19)

Connacht

- None Participated

Leinster (4)

- Carlow (13)
- Laois (15)
- Westmeath (17)

Munster (1)

- None Participated

Ulster (1)

- Antrim (12)
- Down (14)

== Teams ==
=== General Information ===
Six counties will compete in the Joe McDonagh Cup:

County	Last Cup Title	Last Provincial Title	Last All-Ireland Title	Position in 2025 Championship	Appearance
Antrim	2022	2017	—	6th (Leinster Senior Hurling Championship)	5th
Carlow	2023	—	—	3rd	7th
Down	—	1997	—	5th	6th
Laois	2019	1949	1915	Runners-Up	6th
London	—	—	1901	Champions (Christy Ring Cup)	1st
Westmeath	2021	—	—	4th	7th

=== Personnel and kits ===
County	Manager	Captain(s)	Sponsor
Antrim	Davy Fitzgerald	Conal Cunning and Niall O'Connor	Fibrus
Carlow	Pat Bennett	Chirs Nolan	MW Hire Group
Down	Ronán Sheehan		EOS IT Solutions
Laois	Tommy Fitzgerald	David Dooley	Laois Hire
London	Eoin O'Neill	Seán Glynn	Clayton Hotels
Westmeath	Kevin O'Brien	Ronan Wallace	TEG

== Group Stage ==
=== Table ===
Pos	Team	Pld	W	D	L	SF	SA	Diff	Pts	Qualification
1	Carlow	5	4	0	1	17-96	7-94	+32	8	Advanced to Final
2	Laois	5	4	0	1	13-125	6-104	+42	8	Advanced to Final
3	Down	5	3	0	2	6-117	10-103	+2	6	
4	Antrim	5	3	0	2	6-122	10-89	+21	6	
5	Westmeath	5	1	0	4	7-102	12-120	-33	2	
6	London (R)	5	0	0	5	6-71	10-123	-64	0	Relegated to Christy Ring Cup

=== Round 1 ===
18 April 2026 Round 1	Antrim	0-23 (23) - (25) 1-22	Down	Dunloy
13:30	S Elliot 0-11 (10fs), J McNaughton 0-3, R McCambridge 0-2, K Molloy 0-2, C Cunning 0-2, P Boyle 0-1, E O’Neill 0-1, J McCloskey 0-1.	Report	P Óg McCrickard 0-8 (8fs), D Hughes 1-1, T McGrattan 0-4, D Sands 0-2, C Taggart 0-1, L Savage 0-1, C Coleman 0-1, M Fisher 0-1, O McDermott 0-1, B Teggart 0-1, F Turpin 0-1.	Stadium: Pearse Park

18 April 2026 Round 1	Carlow	4-17 (29) - (20) 1-17	Laois	Carlow
18:00	M Kavanagh 0-9 (9fs), C Nolan 1-2 (1-sl), J Doyle 1-1, F Fitzpatrick 1-1, C Kehoe 1-1, J Nolan 0-2, J Treacy 0-1.	Report	A Dunphy 0-9 (7fs), B Conroy 1-2, S Maher 0-4 (1f), J Kelly 0-1, D Dooley 0-1.	Stadium: Netwatch Cullen Park

19 April 2026 Round 1	London	0-15 (15) - (25) 1-22	Westmeath	Ruislip
13:00	J Morrissey 0-7 (5f), P Kennedy 0-2, F Ó Riaian Broin (‘65’), D Dawson, R Lodge, S Glynn, O Donnelly, B Morrissey 0-1 each.	Report	D Williams 0-10 (6f), E Keyes 1-4, E Cunneen 0-3, S Williams, M Cunningham, D McCormack, J Coll, J Gillen 0-1 each.	Stadium: McGovern Park

=== Round 2 ===
25 April 2026 Round 2	Down	2-23 (29) - (23) 2-17	London	Ballycran
13:00	C Coleman 1-3, D Hughes 0-5, D Sands 1-0, T McGrattan, P Óg McCrickard (3fs), and P Smyth (3fs) 0-3 each, M Fisher 0-2, B Trainor, R McCrickard, L Savage, and F Turpin 0-1 each.	Report	R McGrady 0-6 (6fs), S Glynn and J Morrissey (1-1fs) 1-2 each, P Kennedy 0-3, F Whelan 0-2, T Hanafin and E McGrath 0-1 each.	Stadium: McKenna Park

25 April 2026 Round 2	Laois	2-23 (29) - (22) 0-22	Antrim	Portlaoise
16:00	S Maher 0-13 (8fs, 3 ’65s), C Dunne 2-2, M Phelan 0-2, M Dowling, T Keyes, I Shanahan, F C-Fennell, D Dooley and J Keyes 0-1 each.	Report	S Elliott 0-8 (7fs), J McNaughton 0-6 (3fs), R McCambridge 0-3, C Cunning, P Boyle, J McCloskey, K Molloy and E O’Neill 0-1 each	Stadium: Laois Hire O'Moore Park

25 April 2026 Round 2	Westmeath	1-23 (26) - (32) 4-20	Carlow	Mullingar
16:00	D Williams 0-7 (4f, 1 ‘65’), K Doyle 1-3, E Cunneen, S Williams 0-3 each, D McCormack 0-2, J Kearney, A Shaw, P Murphy, K Regan, E Keyes 0-1 each.	Report	M Kavanagh 1-8 (0-5f, 0-1‘65’), F Fitzpatrick 0-5, J Doyle, C Kehoe 1-1 each, C Nolan 1-0, E Kealy, D Murphy 0-2 each, J Nolan 0-1.	Stadium: TEG Cusack Park

=== Round 3 ===
9 May 2026 Round 3	Down	2-17 (23) - (26) 3-17	Carlow	Ballycran
13:00	P Og McCrickard 1-5 (3fs, 1'65), D Hughes 1-2, T McGrattan 0-4, D Sands 0-2, T Prenter 0-3, B Taggart 0-1.	Report	M Kavanagh 1-10 (8fs), J Doyle 1-1, P Boland 1-0, D Murphy 0-4, C Nolan and J Treacy 0-1 each.	Stadium: McKenna Park

9 May 2026 Round 3	Westmeath	2-19 (25) - (43) 5-28	Laois	Mullingar
17:00	P Murphy 1-1, E Keyes, D Williams (2fs) 0-4 each, A Bate 1-0, S Williams 0-3, D McCormack, K Regan 0-2 each, K Doyle, J Gillen, E Cunneen 0-1 each.	Report	A Dunphy 1-10 (4fs), B Conroy 1-5, S Maher 1-4 (1-0pen, 3fs, 1‘65’), T Keyes, G Lynch 1-0 each, C Dunne 0-2, FC Fennell, C McEvoy, R Mullaney, D Dooley, A Corby, M Phelan, J Kelly 0-1 each.	Stadium: TEG Cusack Park

10 May 2026 Round 3	London	4-09 (21) - (25) 1-22	Antrim	Ruislip
13:00	R McGrady 0-5, (5f), P Kennedy, S Glynn 1-1 each, C Byrne, J Morrissey 1-0 each, N Fitzgerald, A Cunney 0-1 each.	Report	S Elliott 0-8 (4f), C Cunning 1-3, J McNaughton 0-3 (3f), K Molloy 0-3, C Johnston, C Bohill, P Boyle, J McCloskey, R Donaghy 0-1 each.	Stadium: McGovern Park

=== Round 4 ===
16 May 2026 Round 4	Carlow	5-27 (42) - (11) 0-11	London	Carlow
13:00	M Kavanagh 2-11 (3-65s, 5fs), C Kehoe 2-0, C Nolan 0-4, J Treacy 1-0, J Doyle 0-3, JM Nolan 0-2, D Murphy 0-2, F O’Toole, D Wall, E Kealy, R Coady, L Doyle 0-1 each.	Report	R McGrady 0-5 (5fs), P Kennedy 0-3, S Glynn, D Dawson, J Loughnane (sideline) 0-1 each.	Stadium: Netwatch Cullen Park

16 May 2026 Round 4	Antrim	2-29 (35) - (26) 2-20	Westmeath	Belfast
17:00	J McLaughlin 1-4 (2fs), S Elliot 0-7 (5fs), R McCambridge 0-5, O Donnelly 1-1, J McNaughton 0-3, J McCloskey 0-2, P Boyle 0-2, K Molloy 0-2, C Cunning 0-1, R Donaghy 0-1, R McCormick 0-1.	Report	D Williams 0-10 (8fs), D McCormack 1-3, E Keyes 1-1, J Coll 0-2, P Murphy 0-2, C McCarthy 0-1, M Cunningham 0-1.	Stadium: Corrigan Park

16 May 2026 Round 4	Laois	4-28 (40) - (27) 0-27	Down	Portlaoise
17:00	A Dunphy 3-5 (2fs), S Maher 0-8 (3fs, 1 65), T Keyes 1-2, A Corby and M Phelan 0-3 each, D Dooley and J Keyes 0-2 each, C Dunne, J Kelly and B Conroy 0-1 each.	Report	P Og McCrickard 0-15 (7fs), T McGrattan 0-3 (1f), T Prenter, F Turpin and D Sands 0-2 each, B Trainor, C Coleman and P Sheehan (65) 0-1 each.	Stadium: Laois Hire O'Moore Park

=== Round 5 ===
24 May 2026 Round 5	Antrim	3-26 (35) - (18) 1-15	Carlow	Belfast
13:00	J McNaughton 0-13 (10f), K Molloy 1-5, J McLaughlin 1-1, R Donaghy 1-0, P Boyle 0-3, R McCambridge 0-2, G Walsh 0-1, S Walsh 0-1	Report	R Murphy 1-8 (8F), J Doyle 0-4, E English 0-1, C Beck 0-1, C Kavanagh 0-1	Stadium: Corrigan Park

24 May 2026 Round 5	Down	1-28 (31) - (21) 1-18	Westmeath	Ballycran
13:00	F Turpin 0-5, P Og McCrickard 0-5 (4f, 1'65), D Hughes 0-3, R McCrickard 1-0, T Prenter 0-3, R Beatty 0-3, T McGrattan 0-2, T Murray 0-2, P Sheehan 0-2 (2f), C Taggart, D Sands, M Fisher 0-1 each.	Report	D Williams 0-8 (5f), J Gillen 1-3 (2f, 1'65), D McCormack 0-3, E Cunneen 0-2, M Cunningham, J Bermingham 0-1 each.	Stadium: McKenna Park

24 May 2026 Round 5	London	0-19 (19) - (32) 1-29	Laois	Ruislip
13:00	R McGrady 0-9 (eight frees), J Morrissey 0-3 (one free), D Dawson 0-2, P Kennedy 0-1, J Loughnane 0-1, C Byrne 0-1, E Kelly 0-1, D Leahy 0-1.	Report	A Dunphy 0-13 (eight frees), C Dunne 1-2, J Kelly 0-3, J Keyes 0-2, M Dowling 0-2, M Phelan 0-2, A Corby 0-2, G Lynch 0-1, R Mullaney 0-1, F Mahoney 0-1.	Stadium: McGovern Park

== Knockout Stage ==
=== Final ===
6 June 2026 Final	Carlow	1-18 (21) – (30) 1-27	Laois	Dublin
15:45		(HT: 1-07 - 0-13)		Venue: Croke Park
	Pts: M Kavanagh 0-7 (0-4f, 0-1 65), J Doyle 1-1, J Treacy 0-3, F Fitzpatrick 0-2, C Nolan 0-2, E Kealy 0-1, D Murphy 0-1, K McDonald 0-1 (0-1f).	Report	Pts: S Maher 0-9 (0-6f), C Dunne 1-6, A Dunphy 0-3, J Kelly 0-3, T Keyes 0-1, M Phelan 0-1, B Conroy 0-1, FC Fennell 0-1, D Dooley 0-1, J Keyes 0-1.	TV: RTÉ 2

== Stadia and Locations ==
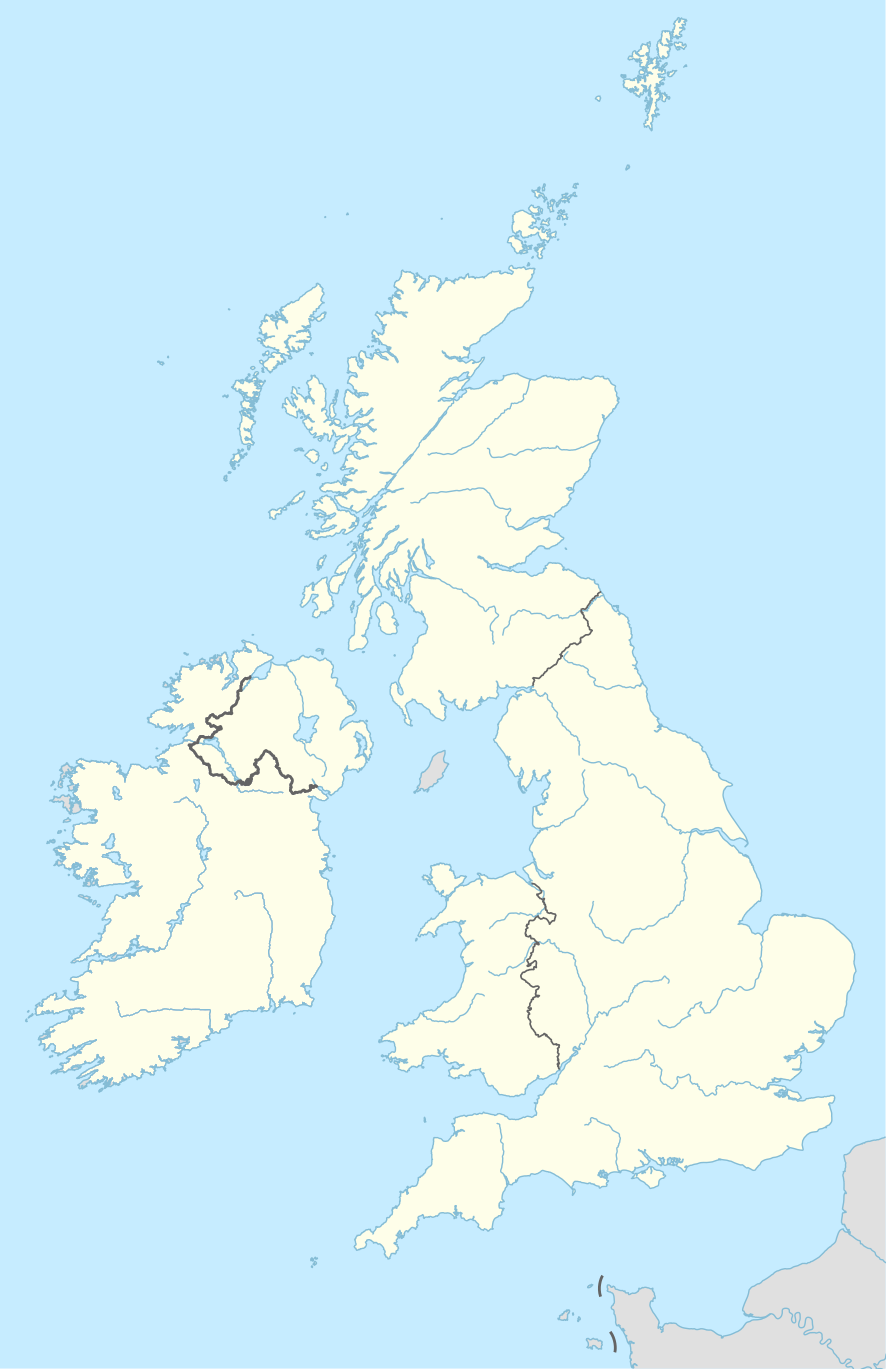
Locations of the 2026 Joe McDonagh Cup teams.

County	Location	Province	Stadium(s)	Capacity
Antrim	Belfast	Ulster	Corrigan Park	3,700
Carlow	Carlow	Leinster	Dr Cullen Park	21,000
Down	Rubane	Ulster	McKenna Park	1,320
Laois	Portlaoise	Leinster	O'Moore Park	22,000
London	South Ruislip	Britain	McGovern Park	3,000
Westmeath	Mullingar	Leinster	TEG Cusack Park	11,500

== Statistics ==
=== Top scorers ===
Overall

Rank	Player	County	Tally	Total	Matches	Average
1	Marty Kavanagh	Carlow	4-45	57	5	11.40
2	Aaron Dunphy	Laois	4-40	52	6	8.66
3	Stephen Maher	Laois	1-38	41	5	8.20
4	Pearse Óg McCrickard	Down	1-36	39	5	7.80
4	David Williams	Westmeath	0-39	39	5	7.80
6	Seánn Elliott	Antrim	0-34	34	4	8.50
7	James McNaughton	Antrim	0-28	28	5	5.60
8	Cillian Dunne	Laois	4-13	25	6	4.16
8	Ronan McGrady	London	0-25	25	5	5.00
10	James Doyle	Carlow	4-11	23	6	3.83

In a single game

Rank	Player	County	Tally	Total	Opposition
1	Marty Kavanagh	Carlow	2-11	17	London
2	Pearse Óg McCrickard	Down	0-15	15	Laois
3	Aaron Dunphy	Laois	3-05	14	Down
4	Marty Kavanagh	Carlow	1-10	13	Down
4	Aaron Dunphy	Laois	1-10	13	Westmeath
4	Stephen Maher	Laois	0-13	0-13	Antrim
4	Aaron Dunphy	Laois	0-13	13	London
4	James McNaughton	Antrim	0-13	13	Carlow
9	Marty Kavanagh	Carlow	1-08	11	Westmeath
9	Seánn Elliott	Antrim	0-11	11	Down

=== Scoring events ===
- Widest winning margin: 31 points
  - Carlow 5–27 — 0–11 London (Round 4)
- Most goals in a match: 7
  - Westmeath 2–19 — 5–28 Laois (Round 3)
- Most points in a match: 48
  - London 0–19 — 1–29 Laois (Round 5)
- Most goals by one team in a match: 5
  - Westmeath 2–19 — 5–28 Laois (Round 3)
  - Carlow 5–27 — 0–11 London (Round 4)
- Most points by one team in a match: 29
  - Antrim 2–29 — 2–20 Westmeath (Round 3)
  - London 0–19 — 1–29 Laois (Round 5)
- Highest aggregate score: 68 points
  - Westmeath 2–19 — 5–28 Laois (Round 3)
- Lowest aggregate score: 40 points
  - London 0–15 — 1–22 Westmeath (Round 1)

== See also ==
- 2026 All-Ireland Senior Hurling Championship
- 2026 Leinster Senior Hurling Championship
- 2026 Munster Senior Hurling Championship
- 2026 Christy Ring Cup (Tier 3)
- 2026 Nicky Rackard Cup (Tier 4)
- 2026 Lory Meagher Cup (Tier 5)
