= Jack McCullagh =

Irish hurler

Personal information
- Native name: Seán Mac Cú Uladh (Irish)
- Born: 2002 (age 23–24) Bagenalstown, County Carlow, Ireland
- Occupation: Student

Sport
- Sport: Hurling
- Position: Left wing-back
Club
- Years: Club
- 2000-present: Bagenalstown Gaels
Club titles
- Carlow titles: 0
College
- Years: College
- 2022-present: TUS Midwest
College titles
- Fitzgibbon titles: 0
Inter-county
- Years: County
- 2021-present: Carlow
Inter-county titles
- Leinster titles: 0
- All-Irelands: 0
- NHL: 0
- All Stars: 0

Jack McCullagh (born 2002) is an Irish hurler. At club level he plays with Bagenalstown Gaels and at inter-county level with the Carlow senior hurling team.

== Career ==
McCullagh began his club career at juvenile and underage levels with the newly-formed Bagenalstown Gaels club, before progressing to adult level in 2020. He was a Carlow SHC runner-up in 2022 after Bagenalstown Gaels was defeated by St Mullin's in the final. McCullagh has also lined out with TUS Midwest in the Fitzgibbon Cup.

MccUllagh began his inter-county career with Carlow as a member of the minor team in 2019. He was part of the team that beat Meath to claim the Leinster MH Shield title in what was his final game in the grade. He was immediately drafted onto the under-20 team, however, his three seasons in this grade ended without success. McCullagh claimed a Joe McDonagh Cup winners' medal after a 2–29 to 1–31 defeat of Offaly in the 2023 final. He ended the season by being named on the Team of the Year.

== Honours ==
Carlow

- Joe McDonagh Cup: 2023
