= Cody Comerford =

Irish hurler

Personal information
- Native name: Mac Óda Mac Cumascaigh (Irish)
- Born: 2004 (age 21–22) Cullohill, County Laois, Ireland

Sport
- Sport: Hurling
- Position: Left corner-back
Club
- Years: Club
- 2022–present: The Harps
Club titles
- Laois titles: 0
Inter-county
- Years: County
- 2025–present: Laois
Inter-county titles
- Leinster titles: 0
- All-Irelands: 0
- NHL: 0
- All Stars: 0

Cody Comerford (born 2004) is an Irish hurler. At club level he plays with The Harps and at inter-county level with the Laois senior hurling team.

== Career ==
Comerford attended Coláiste Mhuire in Johnstown, County Kilkenny and played in all grades of hurling during his time there. He captained the school's senior team to the Leinster PPS SAHC title in 2022.

At club level, Comerford first played for The Harps at juvenile and underage levels. He was part of the club's under-20 team that won three successive Laois U20HC titles between 2022 and 2024. Comerford had progressed to the club's senior team by that stage. He won a Laois SBHC title in October 2025, after a 1–18 to 1–17 win over Abbeyleix in the final.

At inter-county level, Comerford first played for Laois during a two-year tenure with the minor team in 2021 and 2022. He later spent three consecutive years with the under-20 team. Comerford made his senior team debut in a National Hurling League game against Westmeath in February 2025.

Comerford was at corner-back when Laois were beaten by Kildare in the 2025 Joe McDonagh Cup final. He won a National Hurling League Division 2 medal in 2026. Comerford was part of the Laois team that beat Carlow by 1–27 to 1–18 to win the Joe McDonagh Cup title in June 2026.

== Honours ==
Coláiste Mhuire, Johnstown

- Leinster PPS Senior B Hurling Championship (1): 2022 (c)

The Harps

- Laois Senior B Hurling Championship (1): 2025
- Laois Under-20 Hurling Championship (3): 2022, 2023, 2024

Laois

- Joe McDonagh Cup (1): 2026
- National Hurling League Division 2 (1): 2026
