= 2023 Joe McDonagh Cup =

Joe McDonagh Cup

- Dates: 8 April – 27 May 2023
- Teams: 6
- Champions: Carlow (2nd title); Paul Doyle (captain); Tom Mullally (manager)
- Runners-up: Offaly; Jason Sampson (captain); Johnny Kelly (manager)

Tournament statistics
- Matches played: 16
- Goals scored: 51 (3.19 per match)
- Points scored: 683 (42.69 per match)
- Top scorer(s): Martin Kavanagh (3-71)

The 2023 Joe McDonagh Cup was the sixth staging of the Joe McDonagh Cup since its establishment by the Gaelic Athletic Association in 2018.

Antrim, winner of the 2022 final, were promoted to the Leinster Senior Hurling Championship, replaced by Laois who were relegated back to this competition. Kildare were promoted from the Christy Ring Cup.

The top 2 teams from the round robin stage played off in the final to decide the winner, with Carlow defeating Offaly. Both advanced to the 2023 All-Ireland Senior Hurling Championship knock-out stages. The bottom team was relegated to Christy Ring Cup.

== Team changes ==
=== To Championship ===
Relegated from the Leinster Senior Hurling Championship

- Laois

Promoted from the Christy Ring Cup

- Kildare

=== From Championship ===
Promoted to the All-Ireland Senior Hurling Championship

- Antrim

Relegated to the Christy Ring Cup

- Meath

== Format ==
=== Cup format ===
Initially each of the six teams play the other five teams in single round-robin matches. The top two teams after the round robin games compete in the Joe McDonagh Cup final. The Joe McDonagh Cup champions and runners-up also advance to the All-Ireland preliminary quarter-finals with the Joe McDonagh Cup teams having home advantage.

==== Promotion ====
If the Joe McDonagh champions are a non-Munster team, they are automatically promoted to the following year's Leinster Championship. If the champions are a Munster team, they are automatically promoted to the following year's Munster Championship. The Joe McDonagh Cup champions replace the bottom-placed team in the provincial championship containing six teams.

==== Relegation ====
The bottom-placed team in the Joe McDonagh Cup are automatically relegated to the following year's Christy Ring Cup and are replaced by the Christy Ring Cup champions.

=== Teams by province ===
The participating teams, listed by province, with numbers in parentheses indicating final positions in the 2023 National Hurling League before the championship were:

Connacht (0)

- None participated

Leinster (4)

- Carlow (16)
- Kildare (14)
- Laois (13)
- Offaly (12)

Munster (1)

- Kerry (15)

Ulster (1)

- Down (17)

== Teams ==
=== General Information ===
Six counties will compete in the Joe McDonagh Cup:

County	Last Cup Title	Last Provincial Title	Last All-Ireland Title	Position in 2022 Championship	Appearance
Carlow	2018	—	—	3rd	5th
Down	—	1997	—	5th	3rd
Kerry	—	1891	1891	Runners-up	6th
Kildare	—	—	—	Champions (Christy Ring Cup)	2nd
Laois	2019	1949	1915	6th (Leinster Senior Hurling Championship)	3rd
Offaly	—	1995	1998	4th	3rd

=== Personnel and kits ===
County	Manager	Captain(s)	Sponsor
Carlow	Tom Mullally	Paul Doyle	SETU
Down	Ronan Sheehan	TBD	EOS IT Solutions
Kerry	Stephen Molumphy	Gavin Dooley	Kerry Group
Kildare	David Herity	James Burke	Brady Family Ham
Laois	Willie Maher	Enda Rowland	Laois Hire
Offaly	Johnny Kelly	Jason Sampson	Glenisk

== Group Stage ==
=== Table ===
Pos	Team	Pld	W	D	L	SF	SA	Diff	Pts	Qualification
1	Carlow	5	3	2	0	13-118	1-104	+50	8	Advance to Final and All-Ireland preliminary quarter-finals
2	Offaly	5	4	0	1	7-105	6-93	+15	8	Advance to Final and All-Ireland preliminary quarter-finals
3	Laois	5	3	1	1	14-114	4-87	+57	7	
4	Kerry	5	2	1	2	2-101	6-96	-7	5	
5	Down	5	1	0	4	3-88	18-112	-59	2	
6	Kildare	5	0	0	5	6-68	10-112	-56	0	Relegated to Christy Ring Cup

=== Round 1 ===
8 April 2023 Round 1	Down	1-14 - 1-26	Kerry	Ballycran
	P Og McCrickard 0-6 (3f), R McCrickard 1-0, J Doran, T McGrattan 0-2 each, D Sands, F Turpin, T McGrattan, T Prenter 0-1 each.	Report	S Conway 0-8 (4f, 1sl), E Ross 1-3, D Goggin 0-3, D Shanahan, Niall Mulcahy 0-2 each, C Trant, P Lucid, G Dooley, B Barrett and E Leen 0-1 each.	Stadium: McKenna Park; Referee: P Murphy (Carlow)

8 April 2023 Round 1	Carlow	5-23 - 0-19	Kildare	Carlow
	P Boland 3-0, M Kavanagh 0-12 (9fs, 65), C Kehoe 2-2, J Doyle 0-4, C Nolan 0-3 (1f), D Byrne 0-1, J Nolan 0-1.	Report	J Burke 0-10fs, D Qualter 0-2, C McCabe 0-2, C Dowling 0-1, G Keegan 0-1, Cian Boran 0-1, M Delaney 0-1, J Byrne 0-1.	Stadium: Netwatch Cullen Park; Referee: C Cunning (Antrim)

8 April 2023 Round 1	Offaly	3-19 - 1-22	Laois	Tullamore
	E Cahill 2-11 (0-6f, 0-1 65), Cillian Kiely 0-3, J Keenaghan 1-0, C Mitchell 0-1, B Duignan 0-1, A Cleary 0-1, K Sampson 0-1, P Clancy 0-1.	Report	S Maher 0-12 (0-5f, 0-2 65s), A Dunphy 0-4, A Corby 0-3, P Purcell 1-0, S Bergin 0-1, J Kelly 0-1, E Rowland 0-1f.	Stadium: Glenisk O'Connor Park; Referee: K Jordan (Tipperary)

=== Round 2 ===
16 April 2023 Round 2	Laois	7-24 - 0-14	Down	Laois Hire O'Moore Park
	S Bergin 3-0, S Maher 1-6 (4fs, 1 65), T Keyes 1-1, P Purcell 1-1, W Dunphy 1-1, R King 0-3, A Dunphy 0-2, J Keyes 0-2, P Delaney 0-2, PJ Scully 0-2 (1f), J Lennon 0-2, P Lawlor 0-1, I Shanahan 0-1.	Report	P Sheehan 0-6 (3fs), P Óg McCrickard 0-4 (2fs), L Savage 0-1, T Prenter 0-1, R McCrickard 0-1, C Egan 0-1.	Referee: T Gleeson (Waterford)

16 April 2023 Round 2	Kildare	3-11 - 2-22	Offaly	Manguard Plus Hawkfield COE
	P McKenna 1-5 (1-0 pen, 4fs and 1 '65'), J Burke and C Boran 1-1 each, P Dolan, B Byrne, P Divilly and D Costello 0-1 each.	Report	E Cahill 1-10 (6fs, 1 '65'), Cillian Kiely 1-3, A Cleary 0-3, K Sampson 0-2, J Keenaghan, B Duignan, C Mitchell and Cathal Kiely 0-1 each.

16 April 2023 Round 2	Kerry	0-21 - 0-21	Carlow	Austin Stack Park
	S Conway 0-11 (7fs), P Boyle 0-3 (1f), M Leane and B Barrett 0-2 each, P O'Connor, C Walsh, and D Collins 0-1 each.	Report	M Kavanagh 0-13 (9fs), J Nolan and J Doyle 0-3 each, F Fitzpatrick and C Nolan 0-1 each.	Referee: K Jordan (Tipperary)

=== Round 3 ===
22 April 2023 Round 3	Kildare	0-14 - 1-17	Kerry	Manguard Plus Hawkfield COE
	D Qualter 0-8 (8fs), C McCabe 0-2, R Boran 0-1, G Keegan 0-1, C Boran 0-1, P McKenna 0-1 (f).	Report	P Boyle 0-5 (1f), S Conway 0-5 (4fs), J Conway 1-2, D Shanahan 0-1, E Ross 0-1, C Walsh 0-1, N Mulcahy 0-1, D Goggin 0-1.	Referee: C Flynn (Westmeath)

22 April 2023 Round 3	Carlow	1-22 - 1-22	Laois	Netwatch Cullen Park
	M Kavanagh 1-13 (1-0 pen, 65, 8fs), J Kavanagh 0-3, C Kehoe, J Doyle, C Nolan 0-2 each	Report	S Maher 0-10 (4fs), R King 0-4, S Bergin 1-1, M Phelan, E Rowland (fs) 0-2 each, A Corby, J Keyes (sideline), P Purcell 0-1 each.	Referee: S Cleere (Kilkenny)

22 April 2023 Round 3	Offaly	1-26 - 1-14	Down	Glenisk O'Connor Park
	E Cahill 1-12 (7f), Cillian Kiely 0-5, P Clancy 0-2, D King, J Clancy, D Nally, A Cleary, B Duignan, J Keenaghan and J Murphy 0-1 each.	Report	P Og McCrickard 0-9 (7f), J Doran 1-2, N McFarland, O McManus (f), S Martin and F Turpin 0-1 each.	Referee: P Murphy (Carlow)

=== Round 4 ===
6 May 2023 Round 4	Laois	1-23 - 0-11	Kildare	Glenisk O'Connor Park
	S Maher 0-10 (0-8f, 0-1 65), R King 0-5, T Keyes 1-1, S Bergin 0-2, M Phelan 0-2, J Duggan 0-2, J Kelly 0-1.	Report	D Qualter 0-6 (0-5f), C Boran 0-3, D Flaherty 0-1, K Harrington 0-1.	Referee: P Murphy (Carlow).

7 May 2023 Round 4	Offaly	1-24 - 0-16	Kerry	Laois Hire O'Moore Park
	E Cahill 0-13 (0-9f, 0-2 65s), D Nally 1-1 (0-1 sideline), A Cleary 0-2, B Duignan 0-2, J Sampson 0-1, C Kiely 0-1, J Clancy 0-1, E Kelly 0-1, K Sampson 0-1, J Keenaghan 0-1.	Report	S Conway 0-7 (0-5f, 0-1 65), P Boyle 0-3 (0-2f), G Dooley 0-2, M Leane 0-1, E Ross 0-1, F MacKessy 0-1, J Diggins 0-1.

7 May 2023 Round 4	Down	0-28 - 6-23	Carlow	McKenna Park
	P Og McCrickard 0-10 (8f), F Turpin 0-5, O McManus, M Fisher, C Teggart (1f), R McCrickard (1f) and D Sands 0-2 each; J Doran, L Savage and M Conlon 0-1each.	Report	M Kavanagh 1-11 (7f), C Nolan 2-4, J Nolan 1-2, J Doyle 1-1, C Kehoe 1-0, F Fitzpatrick 0-2, JM Nolan, K McDonald and D Byrne 0-1 each

=== Round 5 ===
13 May 2023 Round 5	Kildare	3-13 - 1-27	Down	Manguard Plus Hawkfield COE
	P McKenna 2-0 (2-0 pens), D Qualter 0-5 (4fs), D Flaherty 1-0, C Boran and G Keegan 0-2 each, C Shanahan, C McCabe, J Byrne, and J Burke 0-1 each.	Report	P Óg McCrickard 0-15 (8fs, 165), L Savage 0-4, E Sands 1-0, C Taggart 0-3, F Turpin 0-2, M Fisher, J McManus and J Doran 0-1 each.	Referee: K Jordan

13 May 2023 Round 5	Carlow	1-29 - 0-14	Offaly	Netwatch Cullen Park
	M Kavanagh 0-14 (7fs 65), C Nolan 0-5 (1 sl), C Kehoe (1-1), J Doyle 0-3, P Boland 0-2, F Fitzpatrick, JM Nolan, K McDonald, J Nolan 0-1 each	Report	S Dooley 0-7 (4fs), D Maher 0-2, J Nally, P Delaney, L Langton, J Murphy, E Kelly 0-1 each.	Referee: C Mooney (Dublin)

13 May 2023 Round 5	Kerry	0-21 - 4-23	Laois	Austin Stack Park
	S Conway 0-7 (7fs), J Conway 0-4, P Boyle 0-3, B Barrett 0-2, E Murphy 0-1, F Mackessy 0-1, P O’Connor 0-1, D Goggin 0-1, P Lucid 0-1.	Report	S Maher 1-12 (6fs, 1 ‘65’), E Rowland 1-2 (1-0 pen, 2fs), P Purcell 1-0, S Bergin 1-0, J Keyes 0-2, T Keyes 0-2, Ian Shanahan 0-1, J Kelly 0-1, P Delaney 0-1, A Corby 0-1, M Phelan 0-1.	Referee: L Gordon (Galway)

== Final ==
27 May 2023 Final	Offaly	1-31 - 2-29 (aet)	Carlow	Croke Park
	E Cahill 0-7 (3f), C Kiely 0-6 (2f), D Nally 0-5 (1 ‘65’, 1 sideline and 1f), C Mitchell 1-1, A Cleary 0-3, K Sampson, P Clancy and E Kelly 0-2 each, J Keenaghan, S Bourke, J Sampson 0-1 each	Report	Martin Kavanagh 1-8 (5f, 1 '65), Paddy Boland 1-4, Chris Nolan 0-4, James Doyle 0-3, Jon Nolan 0-3, John Michael Nolan 0-2, Conor Kehoe 0-2, Jack Kavanagh 0-2, Diarmuid Byrne 0-1, Kevin McDonald 0-1 (f)	Referee: T Walsh (Waterford)

Carlow are promoted to the 2024 Leinster Senior Hurling Championship, replacing Westmeath.

== Stadia and locations ==
Locations of the 2023 Joe McDonagh Cup teams.

County	Location	Province	Stadium(s)	Capacity
Carlow	Carlow	Leinster	Netwatch Cullen Park	21,000
Down	Rubane	Ulster	McKenna Park	5,000
Kerry	Tralee	Munster	Austin Stack Park	12,000
Kildare	Newbridge	Leinster	Hawkfield Centre of Excellence	1,300
Laois	Portlaoise	Leinster	O'Moore Park	22,000
Offaly	Tullamore	Leinster	O'Connor Park	18,000

== Statistics ==
=== Top scorers ===
==== Overall ====
Rank	Player	County	Tally	Total	Matches	Average
1	Marty Kavanagh	Carlow	3-71	80	6	13.33
2	Eoghan Cahill	Offaly	4-53	65	5	13.00
3	Stephen Maher	Laois	2-50	56	5	11.20
4	Pearse Óg McCrickard	Down	0-44	44	5	8.80
5	Shane Conway	Kerry	0-38	38	5	7.60
6	Chris Nolan	Carlow	2-19	25	6	4.16
7	Cillian Kiely	Offaly	1-18	21	5	4.20
7	David Qualter	Kildare	0-21	21	5	4.20
9	Stephen Bergin	Laois	5-04	19	5	3.80
10	Paddy Boland	Carlow	4-06	18	5	3.60

==== In a single game ====
Rank	Player	County	Tally	Total	Opposition
1	Eoghan Cahill	Offaly	2-11	17	Laois
2	Marty Kavanagh	Carlow	1-13	16	Laois
3	Eoghan Cahill	Offaly	1-12	15	Down
3	Stephen Maher	Laois	0-12	12	Kerry
3	Pearse Óg McCrickard	Down	0-15	15	Kildare
6	Marty Kavanagh	Carlow	1-11	14	Down
6	Marty Kavanagh	Carlow	0-14	14	Offaly
8	Eoghan Cahill	Offaly	1-10	13	Kildare
8	Eoghan Cahill	Offaly	0-13	13	Kerry
8	Marty Kavanagh	Carlow	0-13	13	Kerry

=== Scoring events ===
Doesn't include extra time.

- Widest winning margin: 31 points
  - Laois 7-24 - 0-14 Down (Round 2)
- Most goals in a match: 7
  - Laois 7-24 - 0-14 Down (Round 2)
- Most points in a match: 51
  - Down 0-28 - 6-23 Carlow (Round 4)
- Most goals by one team in a match: 7
  - Laois 7-24 - 0-14 Down (Round 2)
- Most points by one team in a match: 29
  - Carlow 1-29 - 0-14 Offaly (Round 5)
- Highest aggregate score: 69 points
  - Down 0-28 - 6-23 Carlow (Round 4)
- Lowest aggregate score: 34 points
  - Kildare 0-14 - 1-17 Kerry (Round 3)

== Miscellaneous ==
- Carlow won their 1st championship in 5 years, last winning the 2018 Joe McDonagh Cup.
- First-time Joe McDonagh Cup meetings:
  - Kildare v Offaly (Round 2)
  - Laois v Down (Round 2)
  - Kildare v Kerry (Round 3)
  - Laois v Kildare (Round 4)
  - Kildare v Down (Round 5)
- Laois broke the record for most goals scored in a Joe McDonagh Cup match after scoring 7 against Down in Round 2.
- Offaly qualify to the Joe McDonagh Cup final for the first time.

== See also ==
- 2023 All-Ireland Senior Hurling Championship (Tier 1)
- 2023 Leinster Senior Hurling Championship
- 2023 Munster Senior Hurling Championship
- 2023 Christy Ring Cup (Tier 3)
- 2023 Nicky Rackard Cup (Tier 4)
- 2023 Lory Meagher Cup (Tier 5)
