= Paul Doyle (hurler) =

Irish hurler

Personal information
- Native name: Pól Ó Duill (Irish)
- Nickname: P Dizzle
- Born: 1993 (age 32–33) St Mullin's, County Carlow, Ireland
- Occupation: Teacher (Presentation De La Salle Bagenalstown)
- Height: 6 ft 2 in (188 cm)

Sport
- Sport: Hurling
- Position: Right corner-back
Club
- Years: Club
- St Mullin's
Club titles
- Carlow titles: 5
Inter-county
- Years: County
- 2014-present: Carlow
Inter-county titles
- Leinster titles: 0
- All-Irelands: 0
- NHL: 0
- All Stars: 0

Paul Doyle (born 1993) is an Irish hurler. At club level he plays with St. Mullin's, while at inter-county level he lines out with the Carlow senior hurling team. He is a secondary school teacher in Presentation De La Salle Bagenalstown. He teaches PE and Mathematics. He captained Carlow to Joe McDonagh Cup glory in May 2023.

== Career ==
Doyle first played hurling at juvenile and underage levels with the St. Mullin's club. He eventfully progressed to the senior team and has since won five Carlow SHC medals.

Doyle first appeared on the inter-county scene at minor level with Carlow in 2011. He later lined out with the under-21 side before making his senior team in 2014. Doyle enjoyed his first success when Carlow beat Antrim to win the Christy Ring Cup title in 2017. He collected a National League Division 2A medal in 2018, before ending the season by becoming the inaugural Joe McDonagh Cup champions. Doyle was team captain when Carlow won a second McDonagh Cup title in 2023.

== Honours ==
St Mullin's

- Carlow Senior Hurling Championship: 2014, 2015, 2016, 2019, 2022

Carlow

- Joe McDonagh Cup: 2018, 2023 (c)
- Christy Ring Cup: 2017
- National Hurling League Division 2A: 2018

Sporting positions
Preceded by Michael Doyle	Carlow senior hurling team captain 2023	Succeeded by Incumbent
Achievements
Preceded by Conor McCann	Joe McDonagh Cup Final winning captain 2023	Succeeded by Incumbent
