= 2022 Joe McDonagh Cup =

Joe McDonagh Cup

- Dates: 16 April – 4/5 June 2022
- Teams: 6
- Champions: Antrim (2nd title); Conor McCann (captain); Darren Gleeson (manager)
- Runners-up: Kerry; Paudie O'Connor (captain); Stephen Molumphy (manager)
- Promoted: Antrim
- Relegated: Meath

Tournament statistics
- Matches played: 12

The 2022 Joe McDonagh Cup is the fifth staging of the Joe McDonagh Cup since its establishment by the Gaelic Athletic Association in 2018. The fixtures were published in December 2021.

Westmeath, winner of the 2021 final, were promoted to the Leinster Senior Hurling Championship, replaced by Antrim who were relegated back to this competition. Offaly were promoted from the Christy Ring Cup.

The top 2 teams from the round robin stage will play off in the final to decide the winner. Both will advance to the 2022 All-Ireland Senior Hurling Championship knock-out stages. The bottom team will be relegated to Christy Ring Cup.

== Team changes ==
=== To Championship ===
Relegated from the Leinster Senior Hurling Championship

- Antrim

Promoted from the Christy Ring Cup

- Offaly

=== From Championship ===
Promoted to the All-Ireland Senior Hurling Championship

- Westmeath

Relegated to the Christy Ring Cup

- Kildare

== Format ==
=== Cup format ===
Initially each of the six teams play the other five teams in single round-robin matches. The top two teams after the round robin games compete in the Joe McDonagh Cup final. The Joe McDonagh Cup champions and runners-up also advance to the All-Ireland preliminary quarter-finals with the Joe McDonagh Cup teams having home advantage.

==== Promotion ====
If the Joe McDonagh champions are a non-Munster team, they are automatically promoted to the following year's Leinster Championship. If the champions are a Munster team, they are automatically promoted to the following year's Munster Championship. The Joe McDonagh Cup champions replace the bottom-placed team in the provincial championship containing six teams.

==== Relegation ====
The bottom-placed team in the Joe McDonagh Cup are automatically relegated to the following year's Christy Ring Cup and are replaced by the Christy Ring Cup champions.

=== Teams by province ===
The participating teams, listed by province, with numbers in parentheses indicating final positions in the 2022 National Hurling League before the championship were:

Leinster (3)

- Carlow (16)
- Meath (19)
- Offaly (13)

Munster (1)

- Kerry (15)

Ulster (2)

- Antrim (11)
- Down (14)

== Teams ==
=== General Information ===
Six counties will compete in the Joe McDonagh Cup:

County	Last Cup title	Last Provincial Title	Last All-Ireland Title	Position in 2021 Championship	Appearance
Antrim	2020	2017	—	6th (Leinster Senior Hurling Championship)	4th
Carlow	2018	—	—	Group Stage	4th
Down	—	1997	—	Group Stage	2nd
Kerry	—	1891	1891	Runners-up	5th
Meath	—	—	—	Group Stage	4th
Offaly	—	1995	1998	Champions (Christy Ring Cup)	2nd

=== Personnel and kits ===
Team	Manager	Captain(s)	Sponsor
Antrim	Darren Gleeson	—	fona CAB
Carlow	Tom Mullally	—	IT Carlow
Down	Ronan Sheehan	—	EOS IT Solutions
Kerry	Fintan O’Connor	—	Kerry Group
Meath	Nick Weir	—	Glenveagh Properties
Offaly	Michael Fennelly	—	Glenisk

== Group stage ==
Pos	Team	Pld	W	D	L	SF	SA	Diff	Pts	Qualification
1	Antrim	5	4	0	1	20-116	9-104	+45	8	Advance to Final and All-Ireland Preliminary Quarter-Finals
2	Kerry	5	3	0	2	11-121	7-91	+42	6	Advance to Final and All-Ireland Preliminary Quarter-Finals
3	Carlow	5	3	0	2	7-114	6-96	+21	6	
4	Offaly	5	3	0	2	9-112	7-109	+9	6	
5	Down	5	2	0	3	9-100	11-110	-16	4	
6	Meath	5	0	0	5	5-81	21-134	-101	0	Relegation to Christy Ring Cup

=== Round 1 ===
16 April 2022 Round 1	Antrim	3-22 - 2-24	Offaly	Corrigan Park
	C Cunning 0-10 (7f, 1 ‘65), C Johnson 2-2, C McCann 1-1; C Clarke 0-3, P Burke 0-2, K Molloy 0-1; S Elliott 0-1, R McGarry 0-1, J McNaughton 0-1.	Report	E Cahill 0-14 (11f, 1s, 1 ‘65), D Nally 1-3, P Clancy 1-0, A Cleary 0-2, B Duignan 0-1; J Sampson 0-1, L Fox 0-1; E Kelly 0-1; L O’Connor 0-1.	Referee: C Mooney (Dublin)

16 April 2022 Round 1	Kerry	0-18 - 1-19	Down	Austin Stack Park
	P Sheehan 0-14 (12f, 2 ‘65’), D Sands 1-1, P Óg McCrickard 0-2, M Fisher 0-1, O McManus 0-1.	Report	S Conway 0-11 (8f), P Boyle 0-5 (3f), M Leane 0-1, N Mulcahy 0-1.	Referee: K Jordan (Tipperary)

16 April 2022 Round 1	Meath	0-17 - 4-30	Carlow	Páirc Tailteann
	J Regan (0-7 65 4fs), D Reilly (0-1); N Potterton (0-1), P Potterton (0-1); D Healy (0-1f), J Kelly (0-1), K Keena (0-1f), P O'Hanrahan (0-1f), E O Donnchadha (0-1), J Coyne (0-1), M Cole (0-1).	Report	M Kavanagh (1-9 5fs 65), S Murphy (1-4), C Nolan (1-2), K McDonald (0-5 f); C Kehoe (1-1); D Byrne (0-3), F Fitzpatrick (0-3); R Coady (0-1), J Kavanagh (0-1), J McCullagh (0-1).	Referee: C Cunning (Antrim)

=== Round 2 ===
23 April 2022 Round 2	Offaly	2-22 - 0-19	Meath	Bord na Móna O'Connor Park
	E Cahill 0-9 (0-5f), D Nally 1-2 (0-1f), L Fox 1-1, A Cleary 0-3, J Sampson & B Duignan 0-2 each, J Keenaghan, K Sampson & J Murphy 0-1 each.	Report	J Regan 0-14 (0-12f), É Ó Donnchadha 0-2, D Reilly, M O’Sullivan, P O’Hanrahan 0-1 each.	Referee: M Kennedy (Tipperary

23 April 2022 Round 2	Carlow	0-15 - 3-21	Kerry	Netwatch Cullen Park
	M Kavanagh (0-10, 8f), C Nolan (0-2), D Bryne (0-1, sideline), JM Nolan (0-1), F O’Toole (0-1).	Report	P Boyle (1-11, 7f, 3 ‘65s), S Conway (1-3, 1f), N Mulcahy (1-2), J Conway (0-2), E Ross (0-1), C Harty (0-1), M O’Connor (0-1).	Referee: S Hynes (Galway)

24 April 2022 Round 2	Down	3-16 - 6-22	Antrim	McKenna Park
	D Sands 1-4, C Egan 1-2, E Sands 1-0, P Sheehan 0-2 frees, P Og McCrickard 0-2, P Doran 0-2, M Conlon 0-1, G Hughes 0-1, M Fisher 0-1, O McManus 0-1 (free).	Report	C Cunning 0-10 (8 frees), C Clarke 2-1 (1-0 pen), S Elliott 2-1 (0-1 sideline), C Johnston 1-2, D Nugent 1-2, C McCann 0-2, J Maskey 0-1, G Walsh 0-1 (free), P Burke 0-1, D McKernan 0-1	Referee: J Keenan (Wicklow)

=== Round 3 ===
30 April 2022 Round 3	Antrim	2-22 - 1-22	Carlow	Corrigan Park
	C Cunning 1-11 (0-10 frees), N McManus 1-0, S Elliott 0-3, P Burke 0-2, C Clarke 0-2, C Bohill 0-2, J Maskey 0-1, E O'Neill 0-1.	Report	M Kavanagh 0-11 (9 frees), C Nolan 1-4, K McDonald 0-2, D Byrne 0-1, F Fitzpatrick 0-1, R Coady 0-1, C Kehoe 0-1, JM Nolan 0-1.	Referee: S Stack (Dublin)

30 April 2022 Round 3	Kerry	6-25 - 0-13	Meath	Austin Stack Park
	S Cownay (2-3, 3f), P Boyle (0-7f), M O’Connor (2-0), F Mackessy (0-6), N Mulcahy (1-1), C Walsh (1-1), C Harty (0-2), M Leane (0-1), E Ross (0-1), G Dooley (0-1), J Conway (0-1), B Lonergan (0-1).	Report	J Regan (0-5, 4f, 1 ‘65), S Morris (0-2), P O’Hanrahan (0-1f), É Ó Donnchadha (0-1), N Potterton (0-1), M Burke (0-1), D Healy (0-1), D Kelly (0-1).	Referee: J Murphy (Limerick)

1 May 2022 Round 3	Down	2-18 - 1-26	Offaly	McKenna Park
	P Sheehan 0-8 (6f and 1 '65') C Woods 1-2 (goal free), O MacManus 0-3 (3f), D Sands 1-1, C Teggart, M Conlon, E Sands, C Egan 0-1 each.	Report	E Cahill 0-16 (12f), K Sampson 1-5, D Nally 0-2 (1f), L Fox, J Sampson and J Murphy 0-1 each.	Referee: T Gleeson

=== Round 4 ===
14 May 2022 Round 4	Kerry	2-28 - 4-23	Offaly	Austin Stack Park
	P Boyle 0-15 (11f, 2 ‘65’), M O’Connor 2-0, S Conway 0-5 (1 sideline), F Mackessy 0-2, C Walsh 0-2, J Conway 0-2, E Ross 0-1, C Harty 0-1.	Report	E Cahill 0-10 (7f), D Nally 1-3, K Sampson 2-0, J Murphy 1-1, J Sampson 0-2, L Langton 0-2, C Burke 0-1, B Conneely 0-1, B Duignan 0-1, P Clancy 0-1.	Referee: R McGann (Clare)

14 May 2022 Round 4	Carlow	2-25 - 1-19	Down	Netwatch Cullen Park
	M Kavanagh 1-13 (10fs 65), C Kehoe 1-2, S Murphy 0-5, JM Nolan 0-3, C Nolan, R Coady 0-1 each.	Report	M Fisher 0-11 (9fs 2-65s), D Sands 1-1, P Sheehan 0-3 (2fs), P Og McCrickard, P Doran, R McCusker, C Egan 0-1 each.	Referee: K Jordan (Tipperary)

15 May 2022 Round 4	Meath	3-13 - 7-29	Antrim	Páirc Tailteann
	J Regan (2-07, 1-04 frees, 1-00 pen, 0-01 65), J Walsh (1-00), C Reilly (0-02), K Keena (0-02); J Kelly (0-01), S Morris (0-01).	Report	C Cunning (0-12, 6 frees, 3 65s), C McCann (2-01), P Burke (2-00), S Elliott (1-02), J McNaughton (1-01); E O'Neill (1-01), N McKenna (0-04), M Bradley (0-02); R McCambridge (0-02), G Walsh (0-02), N O'Connor (0-01); J Maskey (0-01).	Referee: C Mooney (Dublin)

=== Round 5 ===
21 May 2022 Round 5	Antrim	2-21 - 0-29	Kerry	Corrigan Park
	J McNaughton (0-9, 1 free), N McManus (1-2), C Bohill (1-1), M Bradley (0-4), E O'Neil, C McCann, A Bradley, K Molloy, D McKernan (0-1 each).	Report	P Boyle (0-15, 12 frees), E Ross (0-4), F Mackessy (0-4), J Conway (0-2), C Walsh, P O'Connor, C Harty, G Dooley (0-1 each)	Referee: J Keenan (Wicklow)

21 May 2022 Round 5	Down	2-28 - 2-19	Meath	McKenna Park
	P Sheehan 0-8 six frees; C Woods 1-4; T Prenter 0-5; R McClusker 1-0; L Savage 0-2; P Og McCrickard 0-2; C Teggart 0-1; T Murray 0-1; M Conlon 0-1; C Egan 0-1; E Sands 0-1; D Sands 0-1; M Fisher 0-1.	Report	J Regan 1-9 six frees, three 65s; M O'Sullivan 0-5 one free; C Reilly 1-1; J Kelly 0-1; M Burke 0-1; N Potterton 0-1; J Walsh 0-1.	Referee: T Gleeson (Dublin)

21 May 2022 Round 5	Offaly	0-17 - 0-22	Carlow	Bord na Móna O'Connor Park
	E Cahill 0-13 (11fs), K. Sampson 0-1, P Clancy 0-1, S Corcoran 0-1, D Nally 0-1 (sl).	Report	C Nolan 0-7, M Kavanagh 0-6 (5fs), K McDonald 0-4, C Kehoe 0-3, R Coady 0-1, D Byrne 0-1f.	Referee: S Cleere (Kilkenny)

== Final ==
4 June 2022 Final	Antrim	5-22 - 4-24	Kerry	Croke Park
16:30	C Cunning 1-12 (0-9f), C Clarke 2-2 (1-0 pen), J McNaughton 1-1, S Elliott 1-0, K Molloy and N McManus 0-2 each, N McKenna, D McKernan and E O’Neill 0-1 each.	Report	P Boyle 2-11 (1-0 pen, 0-7f, 1 ’65), J Conway 2-2, D Collins 0-3, M Leane and S Conway 0-2 each, F Mackessy, G Dooley, M O’Connor and P O’Connor 0-1 each.	Referee: S Stack (Dublin)

Antrim qualify for the 2023 All-Ireland Senior Hurling Championship and are promoted to the 2023 Leinster Senior Hurling Championship, replacing Laois.

== Stadia and locations ==
County	Location	Province	Stadium	Capacity
Antrim	Belfast	Ulster	Corrigan Park	3,700
Carlow	Carlow	Leinster	Dr Cullen Park	21,000
Down	Newry	Ulster	Páirc Esler	20,000
Kerry	Tralee	Munster	Austin Stack Park	12,000
Meath	Navan	Leinster	Páirc Tailteann	11,000
Offaly	Tullamore	Leinster	O'Connor Park	18,000

== Statistics ==
=== Top scorers ===
Top scorer overall

Rank	Player	Club	Tally	Total	Matches	Average
1	Pádraig Boyle	Kerry	3-64	73	6	12.16
2	Eoghan Cahill	Offaly	0-62	62	5	12.40
3	Conal Cunning	Antrim	2-55	61	5	12.20
4	Martin Kavanagh	Carlow	2-49	55	5	11.00
5	Jack Regan	Meath	3-42	51	5	10.20
6	Paul Sheehan	Down	0-35	35	5	7.00
7	Shane Conway	Kerry	3-24	33	6	5.50
8	Chris Nolan	Carlow	2-16	22	5	4.40
9	Daithí Sands	Down	4-08	20	5	4.00
9	Ciarán Clarke	Antrim	4-08	20	4	5.00

In a single game

Rank	Player	Club	Tally	Total	Opposition
1	Pádraig Boyle	Kerry	2-11	17	Antrim
2	Martin Kavanagh	Carlow	1-13	16	Down
2	Eoghan Cahill	Offaly	0-16	16	Down
4	Conal Cunning	Antrim	1-12	15	Kerry
4	Pádraig Boyle	Kerry	0-15	15	Antrim
4	Pádraig Boyle	Kerry	0-15	15	Offaly
7	Pádraig Boyle	Kerry	1-11	14	Carlow
7	Conal Cunning	Antrim	1-11	14	Carlow
7	Eoghan Cahill	Offaly	0-14	14	Antrim
7	Paul Sheehan	Down	0-14	14	Kerry
7	Jack Regan	Meath	0-14	14	Offaly

=== Scoring events ===
- Widest winning margin: 30 points
  - Kerry 6-25 - 0-13 Meath (round 3)
- Most goals in a match: 10
  - Meath 3-13 - 7-29 Antrim (round 4)
- Most points in a match: 51
  - Kerry 2-28 - 4-23 Offaly (round 4)
- Most goals by one team in a match: 7
  - Meath 3-13 - 7-29 Antrim (round 4)
- Most points by one team in a match: 30
  - Meath 0-17 - 4-30 Carlow (round 1)
- Highest aggregate score: 73 points
  - Antrim 5-22 - 4-24 Kerry (final)
- Lowest aggregate score: 39 points
  - Offaly 0-17 - 0-22 Carlow (round 5)

== Miscellaneous ==
- Antrim won their 1st championship in 2 years since winning the 2020 Joe McDonagh Cup.
- Antrim become the first team to win the Joe McDonagh Cup twice.
- Kerry become the first team to contest 3 Joe McDonagh Cup finals in a row and also lose 3 finals in a row.
- Meath become the first team to be relegated from the Joe McDonagh Cup twice.
- Meath holds the record for most goals conceded (21) and most points conceded (197) in a single Joe McDonagh Cup campaign.
- First-time Joe McDonagh Cup meetings:
  - Offaly v Meath (Round 2)
  - Down v Antrim (Round 2)
  - Down v Offaly (Round 3)
  - Carlow v Down (Round 4)
  - Offaly v Carlow (Round 5)
