= Richie Mullally =

Irish hurler

Personal information
- Native name: Ristéard Ó Maolalaidh (Irish)
- Nickname: Richie
- Born: 27 June 1978 (age 48) Glenmore, County Kilkenny, Ireland
- Occupations: Dairy and cereal farmer
- Height: 5 ft 11 in (180 cm)

Sport
- Sport: Hurling
- Position: Half back
Club
- Years: Club
- Glenmore
Club titles
- Kilkenny titles: 0
Inter-county
- Years: County
- 2002-2008: Kilkenny
Inter-county titles
- Leinster titles: 6
- All-Irelands: 5
- NHL: 4

Richard Michael Mullally (born 27 June 1978) is an Irish sportsperson. He played right wing back on the Kilkenny senior hurling team.

Richie Mullally was born in Davidstown County Kilkenny in 1978. A dairy and cereal farmer by profession, Mr. Mullally plays his local club hurling with Glenmore. Since beginning his playing career at inter-county level in 2002 he has won 5 All-Ireland medals, 5 Leinster Championship medals and 4 National Hurling League medals. Mullally also has a host of underage awards as well as County Championship medal. His brother, Paddy Mullally, was also a member of the Kilkenny senior hurling panel winning an All Ireland Senior medal in 2003.

His brother Tom is a manager.
