= Richard Coady =

Carlow hurler

Personal information
- Native name: Risteard Mac Óda (Irish)
- Nickname: Richie
- Born: 1988 (age 37–38) Borris, County Carlow, Ireland

Sport
- Sport: Hurling
- Position: Left wing-back
Club
- Years: Club
- Mount Leinster Rangers
Club titles
- Carlow titles: 12
- Leinster titles: 1
- All-Ireland Titles: 0
Inter-county
- Years: County
- 2008–: Carlow
Inter-county titles
- Leinster titles: 0
- All-Irelands: 0
- NHL: 0
- All Stars: 0

Richard Coady (born 1988) is an Irish hurler who plays for Carlow Senior Championship club Mount Leinster Rangers and at inter-county level with the Carlow senior team. He usually lines out as a left wing-back.

Richie is the holder of 12 Carlow Senior Hurling Championships, 1 Leinster Intermediate Club Championship, 1 All Ireland Intermediate Club Championship and 1 Leinster Senior Hurling Championship. Coady is noted as having captained the first team to win the Joe McDonagh Cup, in 2018.

He played on the same Carlow minor team as Pádraig Amond.

== Honours ==
Mount Leinster Rangers

- Leinster Senior Club Hurling Championship (1): 2013
- Carlow Senior Hurling Championship (8): 2006, 2007, 2009, 2011, 2012, 2013, 2017

Carlow

- Joe McDonagh Cup (1): 2018
- Christy Ring Cup (3): 2008, 2009, 2017
