= Tom Mullally =

Hurling manager

Sport
Inter-county management
- Years: Team
- 2021–: Carlow

Tom Mullally is a hurling coach who has been manager of Carlow since January 2021.

He is from the village of Glenmore in County Kilkenny and is a brother of Richie and Paddy Mullally. He coached Kilkenny GAA club Clara to the 2013 Kilkenny Senior Hurling Championship, the club's first for nearly three decades.

He brought Mount Leinster Rangers to the 2013 Leinster Senior Club Hurling Championship and the final of the 2013–14 All-Ireland Senior Club Hurling Championship, in the last of which Portumna defeated his team.

He led the Wexford under-21 hurling team to the 2018 Leinster Under-21 Hurling Championship final.

He linked up with the Carlow hurling minor team as a coach/selector in 2020 and also managed Naas. He was also involved with the Wicklow seniors.

Sporting positions
| Preceded by Colm Bonnar | Carlow Senior Hurling Manager; 2021– | Succeeded by Incumbent |
Achievements
| Preceded by Darren Gleeson | Joe McDonagh Cup winning manager 2021 | Succeeded by Darren Gleeson |
| Preceded by Darren Gleeson | Joe McDonagh Cup winning manager 2023 | Succeeded by Johnny Kelly |
