= McKenna Park =

Public park in Portland, Oregon, U.S.

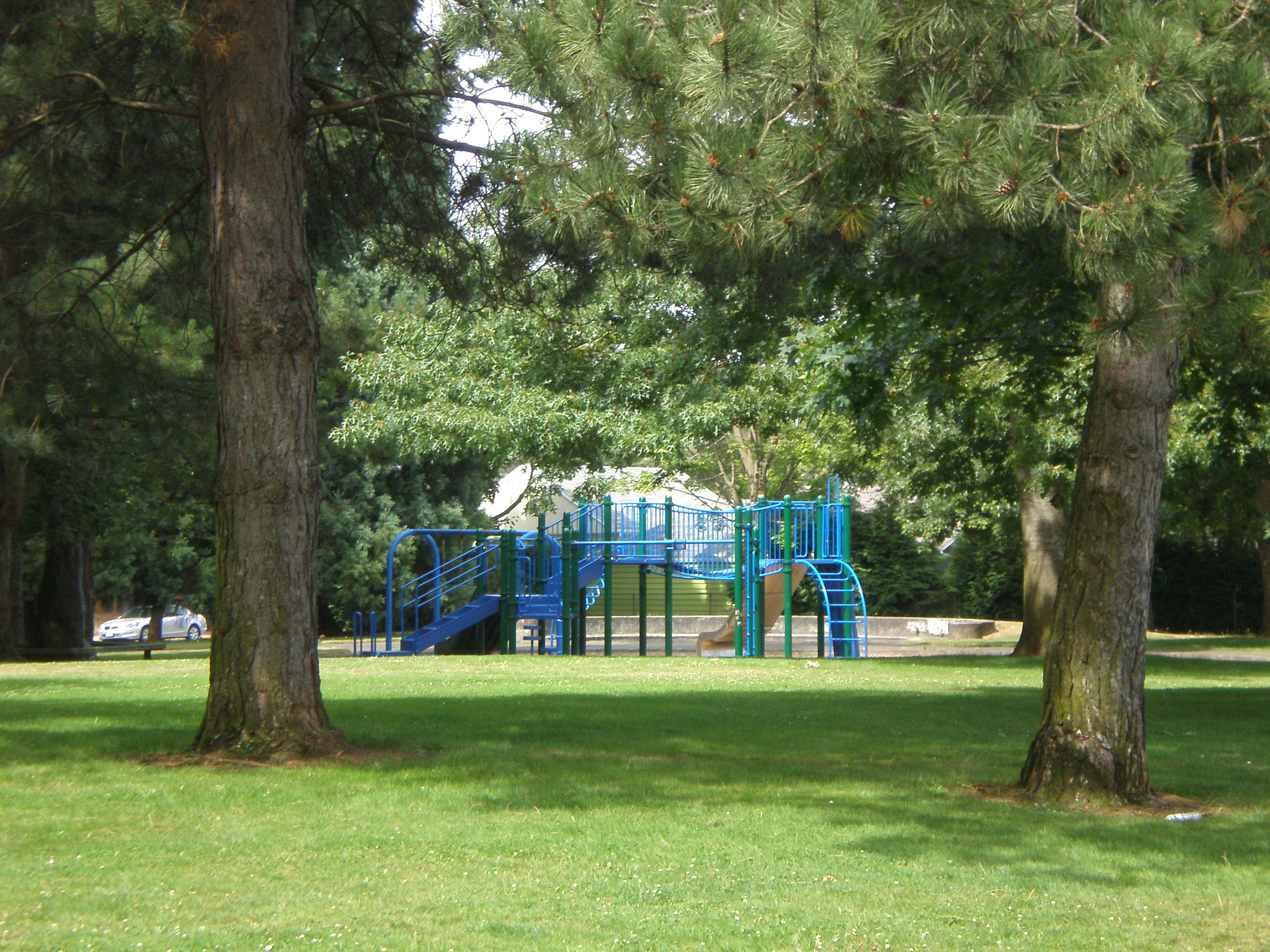
- Part of the park in 2010

- Location within Portland, Oregon
- Location: N Wall Ave. and Princeton St. Portland, Oregon
- Coordinates: 45°34′55″N 122°43′59″W
- Area: 4.52 acres (1.83 ha)
- Established: 1940
- Operator: Portland Parks & Recreation

McKenna Park is a 4.52-acre (1.83 ha) public park in the University Park neighborhood of Portland, Oregon, in the United States. The park was acquired in 1940.
