= Glenmore, County Kilkenny =

Village in County Killenny, Ireland

Coordinates: 52.3541°N 7.0266°W

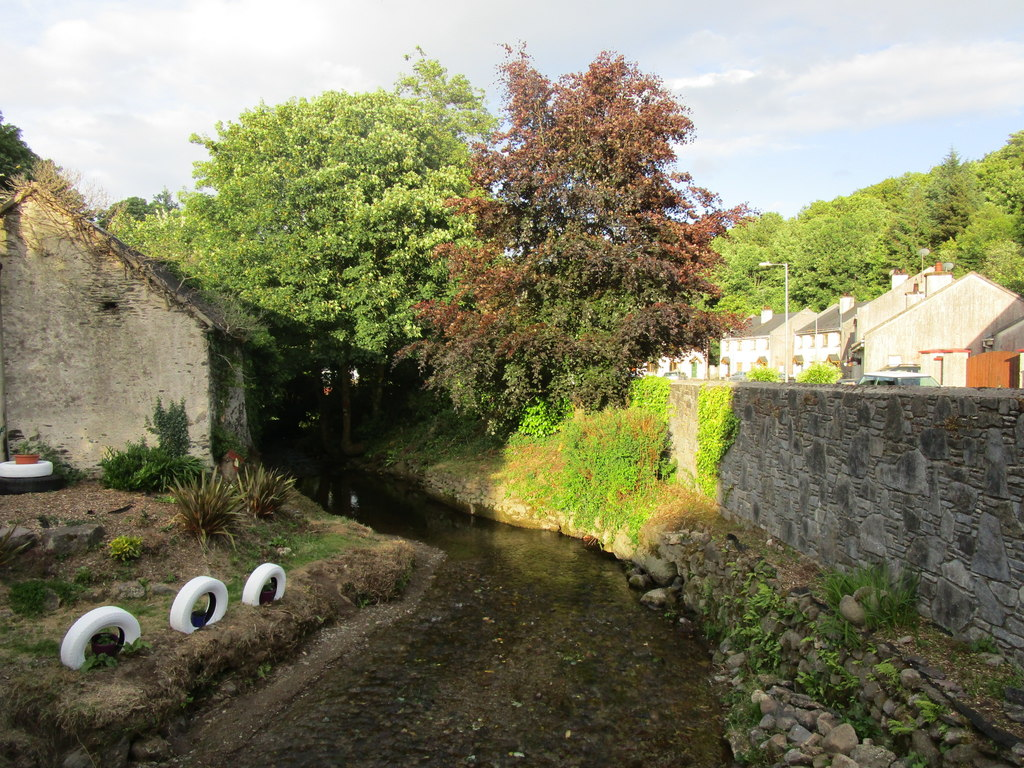
A stream flows through Glenmore village

Glenmore is a village in County Kilkenny, Ireland. It lies just off the N25 road close to the border between County Kilkenny and County Wexford. Glenmore GAA is the local Gaelic Athletic Association club, and Glenmore National School is the local primary (national) school. Saint James's Catholic Church in Glenmore was built in 1813.

== Irish language ==
Baile Shéamais, in Glenmore, was home to Pádraig Paor (also known as Patrick Power) who is believed to have been the last traditional native speaker of the Irish language in County Kilkenny. Audio-recordings were made of his speech in 1936 for the Irish Folklore Commission (Coimisiún Béaloideasa Éireann) by Séamus Ó Duilearga and Risteárd A Breatnach. His speech contains the well-documented Ossory pronunciation of slender R [ɾʲ] as [ʒʲ], resembling the ⟨j⟩ of Standard French.

== People ==
- Tom Mullally, hurling manager

== See also ==
- Rose Fitzgerald Kennedy Bridge - nearby roadbridge
