= Joe McDonagh Cup =

Irish inter-county hurling competition

- Current season or competition: 2026 Joe McDonagh Cup
- Irish: Corn Sheosaimh Mhic Dhonnacha
- Code: Hurling
- Founded: 2018; 8 years ago
- Region: (Republic of Ireland) Ireland (GAA)
- Trophy: Joe McDonagh Cup
- No. of teams: 6
- Title holders: Laois (2nd title)
- Most titles: Antrim, Carlow, Laois (2 titles)
- Sponsors: Bord Gáis Energy, Centra, Eir
- TV partner: RTÉ2
- Motto: GAA. Where We All Belong.
- Official website: Official website

The Joe McDonagh Cup (Irish: Corn Sheosaimh Mhic Dhonnacha) is an annual inter-county hurling competition organised by the Gaelic Athletic Association. The cup forms the second-tier of Hurling for senior county teams (the All-Ireland Senior Hurling Championship is the first-tier trophy). It is contested by the six county teams ranked 12–17 in the All-Ireland Senior Hurling Championship. Each year, the champions of the Joe McDonagh Cup are promoted to their provincial championship, and the lowest finishing team is relegated to the Christy Ring Cup. The cup is named in honour of Joe McDonagh, the former president of the GAA who died in 2016. The last of the five tiers to be established, the competition was contested for the first time in 2018.

The title has been won by six different counties, two of whom have won the title more than once. The all-time record-holders are Antrim and Carlow, who have won the championship on two occasions. Laois are the title holders, defeating Carlow by 1-27 to 1-18 in the 2026 final.

== History ==
=== Creation ===
At the GAA's Special Congress on 30 September 2017, a new provincial hurling championship system featuring five-team round-robin groups in both Leinster and Munster was accepted. This restructure necessitated the removal of four counties from the Leinster Championship. These four teams joined the 2017 Christy Ring Cup finalists - Antrim and Carlow - in creating the new Tier 2 Championship. The proposal was carried by a narrow margin with 62% voting in favour (a majority of at least 60% was required).

An amendment to the motion from Laois, Offaly and Meath was carried by 87%. This would see the two Joe McDonagh Cup finalists participating in preliminary All-Ireland quarter-finals against the third-placed team in both Leinster and Munster with the Joe McDonagh Cup teams having home advantage.

=== Development ===
The competition has reduced and increased its participants between 5 and 6 teams throughout its history.

=== Team changes ===
9 county teams have participated in at least one edition of the McDonagh Cup. Kerry have been ever-presents, never being promoted or relegated, while Offaly hold the dubious distinction of being the only team to fall from the tier-one Leinster championship into the Joe McDonagh and immediately into the hurling's third-tier, the Christy Ring Cup, in successive seasons — in 2018 and 2019.

=== Format history ===
==== 2021 ====
In 2021, teams were divided into 2 groups to lessen the fixtures due to impact of the COVID-19 pandemic on Gaelic games.

=== Joe McDonagh Cup moments ===
- Carlow 2-26 - 1-24 Westmeath (1 July 2018): Carlow won the inaugural Joe McDonagh Cup, defeating Westmeath in Croke Park.
- Kerry 1-18 - 1-16 Offaly (15 June 2019): Kerry relegated Offaly in round 5 of the group stage. This was Offaly's second relegation in a row, previously being relegated from the Leinster Senior Hurling Championship.
- Down 3-16 - 6-22 Antrim (24 April 2022): This was the first championship meeting between the counties since the Ulster Senior Hurling Championship was suspended. The 2015 Ulster final was their last meeting, Antrim also being victorious on that day.
- Offaly 2-23 - 0-26 Laois (8 June 2024): Offaly won their first ever Joe McDonagh Cup in what was a historical week for the county as they also won the 2024 All-Ireland Under-20 Hurling Championship against Tipperary with many dual players.
- Kildare 2-26 - 1-19 Laois (8 June 2025): Kildare won their first ever Joe McDonagh Cup title after defeating Laois in Croke Park. Having only been promoted from the Christy Ring Cup the previous season, Kildare completed a remarkable rise by winning the competition at the first attempt and securing promotion to the Leinster Senior Hurling Championship.
- Down 1-22 - 0-23 Antrim (18 April 2026): Down defeated Antrim in the opening-round Joe McDonagh Cup clash at Pearse Park, with Donal Hughes scoring a last-gasp winning goal. The victory came after Down had also beaten Antrim earlier in the 2026 National Hurling League, signalling a growing shift in the balance of power within Ulster hurling.

== Format ==
=== Group stage ===
Group stage: There are six teams in the Cup. During the course of a season (from May to June) each team plays the others once (a single round-robin system) for a total of five games. Teams receive two points for a win and one point for a draw. No points are awarded for a loss. Teams are ranked by total points. The top two teams in the group contest the Joe McDonagh Cup final. The third, fourth and fifth-placed team are eliminated from the championship and the 6th-placed team is relegated to the Christy Ring Cup.

==== Tie-breakers ====
In the event of teams finishing on equal points, the tie shall be decided by the following means (in the order specified):

- Where two teams only are involved – the outcome of the meeting of the two teams
- Score difference – subtracting the total "Scores Against" from the total "Scores For"
- Highest Total "Score For"
- Highest Total "Goals For"
- A Play-Off

=== Knockout stage ===
Final: The top two teams in the group stage contest the final. The winning team are declared champions.

Between 2018 and 2025 (excluding the 2020 and 2021 editions which were effected by the Covid-19 Pandemic) the winners and runners up of the Joe McDonagh Cup also competed in that year's GAA Hurling All-Ireland Senior Championship at the preliminary quarter-final stage.

There are reports that this same-year link between the competitions may be severed in the future.

=== Promotion ===
At the end of the championship, the winning team is promoted to the provincial championship for the following season. Which provincial championship depends on the provincial allegiance of the winner:

- if the winners are from Connacht, Leinster or Ulster, they are automatically promoted to the following year's Leinster Senior Hurling Championship, with their place in the following year's Joe McDonagh Cup taken by the bottom-placed team in that year's Leinster Championship.
- From 2023 onwards, if the winners are from Munster, they are automatically promoted to the following year's Munster Senior Hurling Championship, with their place in the following year's Joe McDonagh Cup taken by the bottom-placed team in the provincial championship that contains six teams. The previous format only allowed Kerry access to the Munster Championship via a playoff if they won the Joe McDonagh Cup.

=== Relegation ===
The bottom team in the Joe McDonagh group stage is relegated to the third-tier Christy Ring Cup for the following year, being replaced by the champions of the Christy Ring Cup for that year. Since 2018 there has been no promotion/relegation playoff between tiers two and three.

Team	Qualification
1st in Group	Advance to Joe McDonagh Cup Final Winner of Cup Final Promoted to Leinster or Munster Hurling Championship.
2nd in Group	Advance to Joe McDonagh Cup Final Winner of Cup Final Promoted to Leinster or Munster Hurling Championship.
3rd in Group	
4th in Group
5th in Group
6th in Group	Relegated to Christy Ring Cup

== Teams ==
=== 2027 Cup ===
Six counties will compete in the 2027 Joe McDonagh Cup, with Kildare relegated from the Leinster Senior Hurling Championship and Derry promoted from the Christy Ring Cup:

County	Location	Stadium	Province	Position in 2026 championship	First year in Championship	In Championship Since	Championship Titles	Last Championship Title
Antrim	Belfast	Corrigan Park	Ulster	4th	2018	2026	2	2022
Carlow	Carlow	Dr Cullen Park	Leinster	Runners-up	2018	2025	2	2023
Derry	Derry	Celtic Park	Ulster	Christy Ring Cup Champion	2027	2027	0	—
Down	Newry	Páirc Esler	Ulster	3rd	2021	2021	0	—
Kildare	Newbridge	St Conleth's Park	Leinster	6th (Leinster Senior Hurling Championship)	2021	2027	1	2025
Westmeath	Mullingar	Cusack Park	Leinster	5th	2018	2024	1	2021

=== Seasons in Joe McDonagh Cup ===
The number of years that each county has played in the Joe McDonagh Cup between 2018 and 2027. A total of 11 counties have competed in at least one season of the Joe McDonagh Cup. Carlow, Kerry and Westmeath have participated in 8 seasons. The counties in bold participate in the 2027 Joe McDonagh Cup.

Years	Counties
8	**Carlow**, Kerry, **Westmeath**
7	**Down**
6	**Antrim**, Laois
5	Meath
4	**Kildare**, Offaly
1	**Derry**, London

=== Debut of teams ===
Year	Debutants	Total
2018	Antrim, Carlow, Kerry, Laois, Meath, Westmeath	6
2019	Offaly	1
2020	None	0
2021	Down, Kildare	2
2022–2025	None	0
2026	London	1
2027	Derry	1
**Total**		**11**

=== Participation by province ===
Province	No.	County	No.	Years
Leinster	6	Carlow	7	2018, 2020, 2021, 2022, 2023, 2025, 2026
Leinster	6	Westmeath	7	2018, 2019, 2020, 2021, 2024, 2025, 2026
Leinster	6	Laois	6	2018, 2019, 2023, 2024, 2025, 2026
Leinster	6	Meath	5	2018, 2020, 2021, 2022, 2024
Leinster	6	Offaly	4	2019, 2022, 2023, 2024
Leinster	6	Kildare	3	2021, 2023, 2025
Ulster	2	Down	6	2021, 2022, 2023, 2024, 2025, 2026
Ulster	2	Antrim	5	2018, 2019, 2020, 2022, 2026
Munster	1	Kerry	8	2018, 2019, 2020, 2021, 2022, 2023, 2024, 2025
Britain	1	London	1	2026

=== List of Joe McDonagh Cup Counties ===
County	Total years	Total spells	Longest spell	Most recent promotion	Most recent relegation	Total years absent	Seasons	Joe McDonagh Cup Best finish	Current Status (Level) (2026)	
Antrim	4	2	3	2022	Never relegated	3	2018-2020 2022	**1st**	Leinster Senior Hurling Championship	1
**Carlow**	6	3	4	2023	Never relegated	2	2018 2020-2023 2025-	**1st**	Joe McDonagh Cup	2
**Down**	5	1	5	Never promoted	Never relegated	3	**2021**-	3rd	Joe McDonagh Cup	2
**Kerry**	8	1	8	Never promoted	2025	1	2018-2025	2nd	Christy Ring Cup	2
**Kildare**	3	3	1	2025	2023	5	2021 2023 2025	1st	Joe McDonagh Cup	2
**Laois**	5	3	2	2019	Never relegated	3	2018-2019 **2023-**	**1st**	Joe McDonagh Cup	2
**London**	1	1	1	Never promoted	2026	8	2026	6th	Joe McDonagh Cup	2
Meath	5	3	3	Never promoted	2024	4	2018 2020-2022 2024	6th	Christy Ring Cup	3
**Offaly**	4	2	3	2024	2019	3	2019 2021-2024	**1st**	Leinster Senior Hurling Championship	1
Westmeath	6	3	4	2021	Never relegated	2	2018-2021 **2024**-	**1st**	Joe McDonagh Cup	2

== Qualification for subsequent competitions ==
=== Qualification for the All-Ireland Championship ===
The Joe McDonagh Cup winners and runners-up qualify for the subsequent All-Ireland Senior Hurling Championship at the preliminary quarter-final stage. The teams plays the third-placed teams in the Leinster and Munster championships.

==== All-Ireland record of Joe McDonagh Cup teams ====
Season	County	Round	Opponent	Score
2018	Carlow	Preliminary QF	Limerick	0-13 - 5-22
2018	Westmeath	Preliminary QF	Wexford	0-16 - 2-21
2019	Laois	Preliminary QF	Dublin	1-22 - 0-23
2019	Laois	Quarter-Finals	Tipperary	1-18 - 2-25
2019	Westmeath	Preliminary QF	Cork	0-20 - 1-40
2020	No All-Ireland path for Joe McDonagh Cup finalists			
2021	No All-Ireland path for Joe McDonagh Cup finalists			
2022	Antrim	Preliminary QF	Cork	2-19 - 3-27
2022	Kerry	Preliminary QF	Wexford	0-18 - 3-30
2023	Carlow	Preliminary QF	Dublin	0-21 - 2-25
2023	Offaly	Preliminary QF	Tipperary	3-18 - 7-38
2024	Offaly	Preliminary QF	Cork	3-19 - 4-25
2024	Laois	Preliminary QF	Wexford	0-20 - 0-32
2025	Kildare	Preliminary QF	Dublin	0-13 - 3-25
2025	Laois	Preliminary QF	Tipperary	0-18 - 3-32

== Venues ==
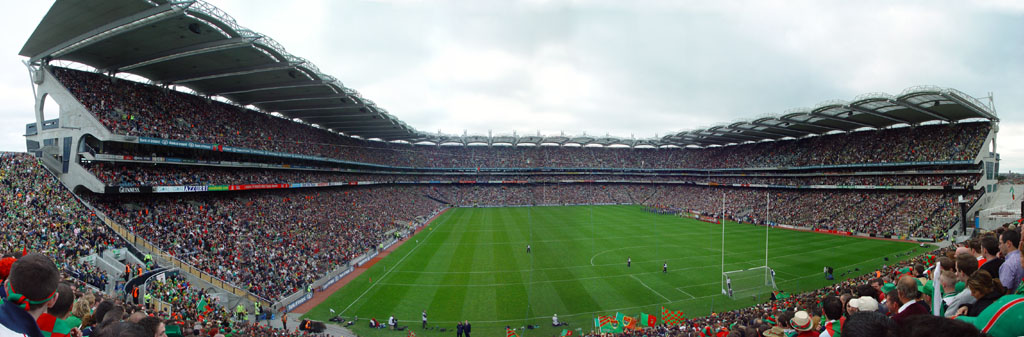
Croke Park in Dublin, hosted the 2018 Joe McDonagh Cup final.

=== Group stage ===
Fixtures in the five group stage rounds of the cup are played at the home ground of one of the two teams. Each team is guaranteed at least two home games. During the inaugural staging of the competition some teams had three home games.

=== Final ===
The Joe McDonagh Cup final is played at Croke Park as the curtain-raiser to the Leinster final on the first Sunday in July.

== Managers ==
=== Winning managers ===
#	Manager(s)	Winning team(s)	Titles(s)	Winning years
1	Darren Gleeson	Antrim	2	2020, 2022
2	Colm Bonnar	Carlow	1	2018
2	Eddie Brennan	Laois	1	2019
2	Shane O'Brien	Westmeath	1	2021
2	Tom Mullally	Carlow	1	2023
2	Johnny Kelly	Offaly	1	2024

== Trophy and medals ==
At the end of the cup final, the winning team are presented with a trophy. The Joe McDonagh Cup is held by the winning team until the following year's final. The presentation is made at a special rostrum in the Ard Chomairle section of the Hogan Stand where GAA and political dignitaries and special guests view the match.

The cup is decorated with ribbons in the colours of the winning team. During the game the cup has both teams' sets of ribbons attached and the runners-up ribbons are removed before the presentation. The winning captain accepts the cup on behalf of his team before giving a short speech. Individual members of the winning team then have an opportunity to come to the rostrum to lift the cup.

The cup is named after Joe McDonagh. He was an All-Ireland medal winner with Galway in 1980 before later serving as President of the Gaelic Athletic Association. McDonagh, who died in May 2016, was one of the most respected figures within the GAA.

The winning team is presented with a set of gold medals.

== List of finals ==
=== List of Joe McDonagh Cup finals ===
Year	Date	Winners		Runners-up		Venue	Winning captain(s)	Winning margin	Referee
Year	Date	County	Score	County	Score	Venue	Winning captain(s)	Winning margin	Referee
2026	6 June	Laois	1-27 (30)	Carlow	1-18 (21)	Croke Park	David Dooley	9	Eamonn Furlong (Wexford)
2025	8 June	Kildare	2-26 (32)	Laois	1-19 (22)	Croke Park	Rian Boran	10	Michael Kennedy (Tipperary)
2024	8 June	Offaly	2-23 (29)	Laois	0-26 (26)	Croke Park	Jason Sampson	3	Colm McDonald (Antrim)
2023	27 May	Carlow	2-29 (35)	Offaly	1-31 (34)	Croke Park	Paul Doyle	1	Thomas Walsh (Waterford)
2022	4 June	Antrim	5-22 (37)	Kerry	4-24 (36)	Croke Park	Conor McCann	1	Sean Stack (Dublin)
2021	17 July	Westmeath	2-28 (34)	Kerry	1-24 (27)	Croke Park	Cormac Boyle	7	Sean Cleere (Kilkenny)
2020	13 December	Antrim	0-22 (22)	Kerry	1-17 (20)	Croke Park	Conor McCann	2	Liam Gordon (Galway)
2019	30 June	Laois	3-26 (35)	Westmeath	1-21 (24)	Croke Park	Patrick Purcell	11	Colum Cunning (Antrim)
2018	1 July	Carlow	2-26 (32)	Westmeath	1-24 (27)	Croke Park	Richard Coady and Diarmuid Byrne	5	Cathal McAllister (Cork)

== Roll of honour ==
=== Performance by county ===
County	Titles	Runners-up	Years won	Years runner-up
Laois	2	2	2019, 2026	2024, 2025
Carlow	2	1	2018, 2023	2026
Antrim	2	0	2020, 2022	—
Westmeath	1	2	2021	2018, 2019
Offaly	1	1	2024	2023
Kildare	1	0	2025	—
Kerry	0	3	—	2020, 2021, 2022

=== Performance by province ===
Province	Titles	Runners-up	Total
Leinster	7	6	13
Ulster	2	0	2
Munster	0	3	3

== Team records and statistics ==
=== Team results ===
Legend

- 1st – Champions
- 2nd – Runners-up
- 3rd/4th/5th – Group Stage
- 5th/6th – Relegated
- L – Leinster Senior Hurling Championship
- CR – Christy Ring Cup

For year, the number of teams (in brackets) are shown.

Team	2018 (6)	2019 (5)	2020 (5)	2021 (6)	2022 (6)	2023 (6)	2024 (6)	2025 (6)	2026 (6)	2027 (6)	Years
Antrim	5th	3rd	1st	L	1st	L	L	L	4th		6
Derry	CR	CR	CR	CR	CR	CR	CR	CR	CR		1
Carlow	1st	L	4th	4th	3rd	1st	L	3rd	2nd		8
Down	CR	CR	CR	3rd	5th	5th	5th	5th	3rd		7
Kerry	3rd	4th	2nd	2nd	2nd	4th	3rd	6th	CR	CR	8
Kildare	CR	CR	CR	6th	CR	6th	CR	1st	L		4
Laois	4th	1st	L	L	L	3rd	2nd	2nd	1st	L	6
London	CR	CR	CR	CR	CR	CR	CR	CR	6th	CR	1
Meath	6th	CR	5th	5th	6th	CR	6th	CR	CR	CR	5
Offaly	L	5th	CR	CR	4th	2nd	1st	L	L	L	4
Westmeath	2nd	2nd	3rd	1st	L	L	4th	4th	5th		8

=== List of Joe McDonagh Cup counties ===
The following teams have competed in the McDonagh Cup for at least one season.

County	Appearances	Debut	Most recent	Championship titles	Last Championship title	Best Joe McDonagh Cup result
Antrim	6	2018	2027	2	2022	1st
Carlow	8	2018	2027	2	2023	1st
Derry	1	2027		0	—	—
Down	7	2021	2027	0	—	3rd
Kerry	8	2018	2025	0	—	2nd
Kildare	4	2021	2027	1	2025	1st
Laois	6	2018	2026	2	2026	1st
London	1	2026		0	—	6th
Meath	5	2018	2024	0	—	5th
Offaly	4	2019	2024	1	2024	1st
Westmeath	8	2018	2027	1	2021	1st

=== All time table ===
Legend

Colours
Currently competing in the Leinster Senior Hurling Championship
Currently competing in the Joe McDonagh Cup
Currently competing in the Christy Ring Cup

As of 8 June (after the 2026 Cup). Includes Relegation Playoffs.

#	Team	Part	Pld	W	D	L	Points
1	Carlow	7	34	21	4	9	46
2	Laois	6	33	21	3	9	45
3	Kerry	8	38	18	1	19	37
4	Antrim	5	26	17	1	8	35
5	Westmeath	7	33	16	2	15	34
6	Offaly	4	21	12	0	9	24
7	Down	6	27	9	1	17	19
8	Kildare	3	15	5	0	10	10
9	Meath	5	22	2	0	20	4
10	London	1	5	0	0	5	0

=== By Semi-Final/Top 4 Appearances ===
Team	No.	Years
Kerry	7	2018, 2019, 2020, 2021, 2022, 2023, 2024
Carlow	7	2018, 2020, 2021, 2022, 2023, 2025, 2026
Westmeath	6	2018, 2019, 2020, 2021, 2024, 2025
Laois	6	2018, 2019, 2023, 2024, 2025, 2026
Antrim	4	2019, 2020, 2022, 2026
Offaly	3	2022, 2023, 2024
Down	2	2021, 2026
Kildare	1	2025

=== By decade ===
The most successful team of each decade, judged by number of Joe McDonagh Cup titles, is as follows:

- 2010s: 1 each for Carlow (2018) and Laois (2019)
- 2020s: 2 for Antrim (2020, 2022)

=== Match records ===
- Most matches played
  - 38, Kerry
- Most wins
  - 21, Carlow
- Most losses
  - 20, Meath
- Most draws
  - 4, Carlow

=== Other records ===
==== Finishing positions ====
- Most championships
  - 2, Antrim (2020, 2022)
  - 2, Carlow (2018, 2023)
- Most second-place finishes
  - 3, Kerry (2020, 2021, 2022)
- Most third-place finishes
  - 2, Kerry (2018, 2024)
  - 2, Carlow (2022, 2025)
  - 2, Down (2021, 2026)
- Most fourth-place finishes
  - 2, Carlow (2020, 2021)
  - 2, Kerry (2019, 2023)
  - 2, Westmeath (2024, 2025)
- Most fifth-place finishes
  - 4, Down (2022, 2023, 2024, 2025)
- Most sixth-place finishes
  - 3, Meath (2018, 2022, 2024)

==== Unbeaten sides ====
- Four teams have won the Joe McDonagh Cup unbeaten:
  - Laois had 4 wins and 1 draw in 2019.
  - Antrim had 4 wins and 1 draw in 2020.
  - Westmeath had 3 wins in 2021.
  - Carlow had 4 wins and 2 draws in 2023.

==== Beaten sides ====
The group stage of the cup has resulted in 3 'back-door' Joe McDonagh Cup champions:

- Carlow (2018) were beaten by Antrim in round 2.
- Antrim (2022) were beaten by Kerry in round 5.
- Offaly (2024) were beaten by Laois in round 1.
- Kildare (2025) were beaten by Kerry in round 1.
- Laois (2026) were beaten by Carlow in round 1.

On one occasion a team was defeated twice but have remained in the championship:

- Kerry (2022) were beaten by Down and Offaly but still qualified for the final.

==== Final success rate ====
Only two counties have appeared in the final more than once, being victorious on all occasions:

- Antrim (2020, 2022)
- Carlow (2018, 2023)

On the opposite end of the scale, only one county has appeared in the final more than once, losing on each occasion:

- Kerry (2020, 2021, 2022)

==== Consecutive participations ====
- 8, Kerry (2018–2025)

Kerry have the record number of consecutive participations in the Joe McDonagh Cup, taking part in the first 8 seasons.

==== Winning other trophies ====
Although not an officially recognised achievement, a number of teams have achieved the distinction of winning the Joe McDonagh Cup and their respective Division in the National Hurling League:

- Carlow in 2018 (Division 2A).
- Antrim in 2020 (Division 2A).
- Laois in 2026 (Division 2).

==== Biggest wins ====
- The most one sided finals:
  - 11 points – 2019: Laois 3-26 - 1-21 Westmeath
- The most one sided group matches:
  - 39 points – 2025: Down 1-12 - 6-36 Laois

==== Scoring Events ====
- Most goals in a match:
  - 11 – 2025: Westmeath 4-22 - 7-23 Carlow
- Most points in a match:
  - 51 points – 2022: Kerry 2-28 - 4-23 Offaly
  - 51 points – 2023: Down 0-28 - 6-23 Carlow
- Most goals by one team in a match:
  - 7 – 2022: Meath 3-13 - 7-29 Antrim
  - 7 – 2023: Laois 7-24 - 0-14 Down
  - 7 – 2024: Meath 1-16 - 7-29 Laois
  - 7 – 2025: Westmeath 4-22 - 7-23 Carlow
- Most points by one team in a match:
  - 36 points – 2025: Down 1-12 - 6-36 Laois
- Highest aggregate score:
  - 78 points – 2025: Down 1-12 - 6-36 Laois
- Lowest aggregate score:
  - 33 points – 2018: Kerry 0-15 - 2-12 Westmeath

==== Successful defending ====
Defending champions are promoted and a number of teams survived the first year of the Leinster Senior Hurling Championship. These are:

- Laois on 1 attempts out of 1 (2020)
- Offaly on 1 attempts out of 1 (2025)
- Westmeath on 1 attempts out of 1 (2022)
- Antrim on 1 attempts out of 2 (2021, 2023)
- Carlow on 0 attempts out of 2 (2019, 2024)
- Kildare on 0 attempts out of 1 (2026)

==== Gaps ====
- Longest gaps between successive cup titles:
  - 7 years: Laois (2019–2026)
  - 5 years: Carlow (2018–2023)
  - 2 years: Antrim (2020–2022)
- Longest gaps between successive Joe McDonagh Cup final appearances:
  - 5 years: Carlow (2018–2023)
  - 5 years: Laois (2019–2024)
  - 3 years: Carlow (2023–2026)
  - 2 years: Westmeath (2019–2021)
  - 2 years: Antrim (2020–2022)
- Longest gap between successive championship appearances
  - 4 years: Laois (2019–2023)
  - 4 years: Antrim (2022–2026)

==== Active gaps ====
- Longest active gaps between since last title:
  - 7 years ago: Laois (2019–)
  - 5 years ago: Westmeath (2021–)
  - 4 years ago: Antrim (2022–)
  - 3 years ago: Carlow (2023–)
  - 2 years ago: Offaly (2024–)
  - 1 year ago: Kildare (2025–)
- Longest active gaps since last cup final appearance:
  - 5 years ago: Westmeath (2021–)
  - 4 years ago: Antrim (2022–)
  - 4 years ago: Kerry (2022–)
  - 2 years ago: Offaly (2024–)
  - 1 year ago: Kildare (2025–)
  - 0 years ago: Carlow (2026–)
  - 0 years ago: Laois (2026–)
- Longest active gap since last cup appearance
  - 2 years ago: Meath (2024–)
  - 2 years ago: Offaly (2024–)
  - 1 year ago: Kerry (2025–)

==== Provinces ====
- Only on 6 occasions has the Joe McDonagh Cup final involved two teams from the same province:
  - Carlow vs Westmeath (2018)
  - Laois vs Westmeath (2019)
  - Carlow vs Offaly (2023)
  - Laois vs Offaly (2024)
  - Kildare vs Laois (2025)
  - Carlow vs Laois (2026)
- The province providing the highest number of different winning teams is Leinster, with five:
  - Carlow
  - Kildare
  - Laois
  - Offaly
  - Westmeath
- Province success rates
  - Leinster 42% (5 out of 12 counties)
  - Ulster 11% (1 out of 9 counties)
  - Britain 0% (0 out of 3 counties)
  - Connacht 0% (0 out of 5 counties)
  - Munster 0% (0 out of 6 counties)

==== Joe McDonagh Cup final pairings ====
Pairing	Meetings	First meeting	Last meeting
Antrim v Kerry	2	2020	2022
Carlow v Laois	1	2026	
Carlow v Offaly	1	2023	
Carlow v Westmeath	1	2018	
Kerry v Westmeath	1	2021	
Laois v Kildare	1	2025	
Laois v Offaly	1	2024	
Laois v Westmeath	1	2019	

==== Longest undefeated run ====
The record for the longest unbeaten run stands at 9 games held by Antrim (2020–2022).

==== Miscellaneous ====
- Best finish by a debuting team
  - Champions, Carlow (2018)
- Best finish by a debuting team (after 2018)
  - 3rd, Down (2021)
- Highest winning record
  - 65.3%, Antrim (17 wins in 26 matches)
- Lowest winning record
  - 0%, London (0 wins in 5 matches)
- Most played match
  - 6, Antrim v Kerry (2018, 2019, 2020 (2x), 2022 (2x))
  - 6, Kerry v Westmeath (2018, 2019, 2020, 2021, 2024, 2025)
  - Carlow v Westmeath (2018 (2x), 2020, 2021, 2025, 2026)
  - Laois and Westmeath (2018, 2019 (2x), 2024, 2025, 2026)

== Player records ==
=== Top scorers ===
==== All time ====
As of 7 May 2023

#	Name	County	Goals	Points	Total
1	Shane Conway	Kerry	6	188	206
2	Marty Kavanagh	Carlow	6	151	169
3	Jack Regan	Meath	5	109	124
4	Neil McManus	Antrim	6	105	123
5	Pádraig Boyle	Kerry	5	107	122
6	Eoghan Cahill	Offaly	4	108	120
7	Ciarán Clarke	Antrim	11	61	94
8	Chris Nolan	Carlow	5	75	90
9	Killian Doyle	Westmeath	3	61	70
10	Stephen Maher	Laois	1	63	66
11	Conal Cunning	Antrim	2	56	62
11	Ross King	Laois	2	56	62

==== By year ====
Year	Top scorer	County	Score	Total
2018	Neil McManus	Antrim	3-67	76
2019	Killian Doyle	Westmeath	3-61	70
2020	Ciarán Clarke	Antrim	4-47	59
2021	Jack Regan	Meath	1-36	39
2022	Pádraig Boyle	Kerry	3-64	73
2023	Martin Kavanagh	Carlow	3-71	80

==== In a single game ====
Year	Top scorer	County	Score	Total
2018	Neil McManus	Antrim	0-17	17
2019	Killian Doyle	Westmeath	0-17	17
2020	Martin Kavanagh	Carlow	1-13	16
2021	Jack Regan	Meath	0-17	17
2022	Pádraig Boyle	Kerry	2-11	17
2023	Eoghan Cahill	Offaly	2-11	17

==== In finals ====
Year	Top scorer	County	Score	Total
2018	Denis Murphy	Carlow	0-10	10
2019	Killian Doyle	Westmeath	1-11	14
2020	Ciarán Clarke	Antrim	0-11	11
2021	Niall Mitchell	Westmeath	0-07	7
2021	Pádraig Boyle	Kerry	1-04	7
2022	Pádraig Boyle	Kerry	2-11	17
2023	Martin Kavanagh	Carlow	1-08	11

=== Captains ===
Winning captain(s)	County	Title(s)	Year(s)
Diarmuid Byrne and Richard Coady	Carlow	1	2018
Patrick Purcell	Laois	1	2019
Conor McCann	Antrim	1	2020
Cormac Boyle	Westmeath	1	2021
Conor McCann	Antrim	1	2022
Paul Doyle	Carlow	1	2023

== See also ==
- Joe McDonagh Cup records and statistics
- All-Ireland Senior Hurling Championship (Tier 1)
- Christy Ring Cup (Tier 3)
- Nicky Rackard Cup (Tier 4)
- Lory Meagher Cup (Tier 5)
