= Patrick Purcell (hurler) =

Irish hurler

Personal information
- Native name: Pádraig Puirséil (Irish)
- Born: 13 May 1992 (age 34) Rathdowney, County Laois, Ireland

Sport
- Sport: Hurling
- Position: Midfield
Club
- Years: Club
- Rathdowney–Errill
Club titles
- Laois titles: 4
Inter-county*
Years	County	Apps (scores)
2013-present	Laois	11 (3-14)
Inter-county titles
- Leinster titles: 0
- All-Irelands: 0
- NHL: 0
- All Stars: 0
- *Inter County team apps and scores correct as of 18:12, 30 April 2017.

Patrick Purcell (born 13 May 1992) is an Irish hurler who plays as a midfielder with the Laois senior team.

== Career statistics ==
As of match played 25 February 2018.

Team	Year	National League			McDonagh Cup		Leinster		All-Ireland		Total	
Team	Year	Division	Apps	Score	Apps	Score	Apps	Score	Apps	Score	Apps	Score
Laois	2013	Division 2A	0	0-00	0	0-00	0	0-00	0	0-00	0	0-00
Laois	2014	Division 1B	4	0-05	0	0-00	0	0-00	1	0-00	5	0-05
Laois	2015	Division 1B	6	1-04	0	0-00	5	0-07	1	0-00	12	1-11
Laois	2016	Division 1B	7	1-03	0	0-00	1	0-00	1	0-00	9	1-03
Laois	2017	Division 1B	6	1-09	0	0-00	4	5-10	2	0-07	12	6-26
Laois	2018	Division 1B	4	1-06	0	0-00	0	0-00	0	0-00	4	1-06
Total			27	4-27	0	0-00	10	5-17	5	0-07	42	9-51

== Honours ==
Rathdowney-Errill

- Laois Senior Hurling Championship (3): 2010, 2012, 2014, 2019
