= 2019 Joe McDonagh Cup =

- Dates: 11 May 2019 - 30 June 2019
- Teams: 5
- Champions: Laois (1st title); Patrick Purcell (captain); Eddie Brennan (manager)
- Runners-up: Westmeath; Aonghus Clarke (captain); Joe Quaid (manager)
- Relegated: Offaly

Tournament statistics
- Matches played: 11
- Goals scored: 40 (3.64 per match)
- Points scored: 442 (40.18 per match)
- Top scorer(s): Killian Doyle (3-61)

The 2019 Joe McDonagh Cup was the second staging of the Joe McDonagh Cup since its establishment by the Gaelic Athletic Association in 2018. The fixtures were announced on 11 October 2018. The competition began on 11 May 2019 and ended on 30 June 2019.

On 30 June 2019, Laois won the Joe McDonagh Cup following a 3-26 to 1-21 defeat of Westmeath in the final at Croke Park. This was their first ever Joe McDonagh Cup title.

Offaly were relegated from the Joe McDonagh Cup after losing all of their group stage games.

Westmeath's Killian Doyle was the competition's top scorer with 3-61.

Laois's Paddy Purcell was Player of the Year. For the first time in 2019, Joe McDonagh Cup competitors were eligible for All Stars and two received nominations. This was discontinued from 2020 onwards.

== Team changes ==
=== To Championship ===
Relegated from the All-Ireland Senior Hurling Championship

- Offaly

Promoted from the Christy Ring Cup

- None

=== From Championship ===
Promoted to the All-Ireland Senior Hurling Championship

- Carlow

Relegated to the Christy Ring Cup

- Meath

== Teams ==
=== General Information ===
County	Last Provincial title	Last All-Ireland title	Position in 2018 Championship	Appearance
Antrim	2017	—	5th	2nd
Kerry	1891	1891	3rd	2nd
Laois	1949	1915	4th	2nd
Offaly	1995	1998	5th (Leinster Senior Hurling Championship)	1st
Westmeath	—	—	Runners-up	2nd

=== Personnel and kits ===
County	Manager	Captain(s)	Sponsor
Antrim	Neal Peden	Conor McCann	Fona Cab
Kerry	Fintan O'Connor	Martin Stackpoole	Kerry Group
Laois	Eddie Brennan	Patrick Purcell	MW Hire Services
Offaly	Kevin Martin (to 20 May) and Joachim Kelly (from 20 May)	Pat Camon	Carroll Cuisine
Westmeath	Joe Quaid	Aonghus Clarke	Renault

== Competition format ==
Initially each of the five teams play the other four teams in single round-robin matches. The top two teams after the round robin games play the third-placed teams in the Leinster and Munster championships in the two All-Ireland preliminary quarter finals with the Joe McDonagh Cup teams having home advantage. The top two teams also compete in the Joe McDonagh Cup final.

Promotion to Leinster or Munster SHC

If the Joe McDonagh champions are a non-Munster team, they are automatically promoted to the following year's Leinster Championship and the bottom-placed team in the Leinster Senior Hurling Championship are automatically relegated to the following year's Joe McDonagh Cup. If the champions are a Munster team, they must win a play-off with the bottom-placed team in the Munster Championship to gain promotion to the following year's Munster Championship.

Relegation

The bottom-placed team in the Joe McDonagh Cup, Offaly are automatically relegated to the following year's Christy Ring Cup and are replaced by the 2019 Christy Ring Cup Champions, Meath.

== Group Stage ==
=== Table ===
Pos	Team	Pld	W	D	L	SF	SA	Diff	Pts	Qualification
1	Laois	4	3	1	0	12-85	6-83	+20	7	Advance to Final and All-Ireland preliminary quarter-finals
2	Westmeath	4	2	1	1	6-85	2-78	+19	5	Advance to Final and All-Ireland preliminary quarter-finals
3	Antrim	4	2	0	2	7-82	6-85	0	4	
4	Kerry	4	2	0	2	3-74	11-68	-18	4	
5	Offaly	4	0	0	4	8-69	11-81	-21	0	Relegated to Christy Ring Cup

=== Rounds 1 to 5 ===
==== Round 1 ====
11 May 2019 Round 1	Antrim	3-19 (28) – (14) 0-14	Kerry	Dunloy
17:00		(HT: 1-7 – 0-9)		Venue: Pearse Park
	Gls: N McKeague 1, C Clarke 1, N Elliott 1 Pts: P Burke 1, N McManus 4 (4f), J McNaughton 2 (2f), R McCambridge 1, K Molloy 3, C Clarke 1, C McCann 2, E O'Neill 2, J Maskey 1, D Kearney 1, K Rice 1	Report	Pts: T O'Connor 1, C Harty 1, S Conway 10 (10f), M O'Leary 2,	Referee: Liam Gordon (Galway)

11 May 2019 Round 1	Offaly	3-21 (30) – (34) 4-22	Laois	Tullamore
19:00		(HT: 1-10 – 0-13)		Venue: Bord na Móna O'Connor Park
	Gls: C Mahon 1, O Kelly 2 Pts: J Bergin 11 (7f), O Kelly 3, C Gath 1, N Houlihan 1, D O’Toole Greene 1, K Dunne 1, Colin Egan 1, C Mahon 1, C Langton 1	Report	Gls: C Dwyer 1, P Purcell 1, E Lyons 1, S Bergin 1 Pts: M Kavanagh 11 (8f, 1sl), R King 4, C Dwyer 3, W Dunphy 1, P Purcell 1, E Lyons 1, C Phelan 1	Referee: Colum Cunning (Antrim); Attendance: 3,163

==== Round 2 ====
18 May 2019 Round 2	Laois	2-24 (30) – (22) 1-19	Antrim	Portlaoise
15:00		(HT: 2-13 - 0-09)		Venue: O'Moore Park
	Gls: W Dunphy 1, P Purcell 1 Pts: M Kavanagh 7 (4f, 2 65s), C Dwyer 5, Enda Rowland 3 (3f), A Dunphy 2, J Kelly 2, J Lennon 1, M Whelan 1, E Killeen 1, S Bergin 1	Report	Gls: N McManus 1 (1f); Pts: R McCambridge 4, N McManus 3 (1f, 1 65), J McNaughton 3 (3f) K Molloy 3, E O’Neill 2, C Clarke 2, P Burke 1, D Kearney 1	Referee: Patrick Murphy (Carlow)

18 May 2019 Round 2	Westmeath	3-18 (27) – (14) 0-14	Offaly	Mullingar
15:00		(HT: 1-13 - 0-05)		Venue: TEG Cusack Park
	Gls: J Boyle 1, Killian Doyle 1, D McNicholas 1 Pts: K Doyle 12 (6f), D McNicholas 3 (1f), A Clarke 1, J Boyle 1, D Clinton 1,	Report	Pts: J Bergin 9 (6f, 1 65), K Dunne 1, M Egan 1, S Dooley 1 (1f), C Kiely 1, S Kinsella 1	Referee: Johnny Murphy (Limerick)

==== Round 3 ====
25 May 2019 Round 3	Westmeath	2-16 (22) – (24) 1-21	Kerry	Mullingar
15:00				Venue: TEG Cusack Park
	Gls: K Doyle 1, A Devine 1 Pts: K Doyle 11 (8fs), D Clinton 2, R Greville 1, S Clavin 1, E Price 1.	Report	Gls: C Harty 1 Pts: S Conway 13 (7fs, 2 '65s), J Conway 3, P Kelly 1, M O’Leary 1, C Harty 1, J O’Connor 1, P Boyle 1.	Referee: P Murphy (Carlow)

1 June 2019 Round 3	Offaly	4-18 (30) – (32) 3-23	Antrim	Tullamore
15:00				Venue: Bord na Móna O'Connor Park
	Gls: O Kelly 2, J Bergin 1, S Cleary 1 Pts: J Bergin 5 (3f, 2 ‘65s), A Treacy 3, O Kelly 2, P Geraghty 2, E Cahill 1 (f), K Connolly 1, C Kiely 1, P Murphy 1, D Nally 1.	Report	Gls: K Molloy 2, N Elliott 1 Pts: N McManus 10 (7f), J McNaughton 4, C Clarke 3, E Campbell 3, N Elliot 1, N McKeague 1, J Maskey 1.	Referee: L Gordon (Galway)

==== Round 4 ====
8 June 2019 Round 4	Kerry	1-21 (24) – (32) 5-17	Laois	Tralee
15:00				Venue: Austin Stack Park
	Gls: P Boyle 1. Pts: S Conway 10 (6f, 3 '65s), P Boyle 5, M Leary 2, J O'Connor 1, D Collins 1, J Goulding 1, M Boyle 1.	Report	Gls: A Dunphy 1, C Dwyer 1, N Foyle 1, R King 1, P Purcell 1. Pts: S Maher 6 (5f), A Dunphy 3, C Dwyer 3, N Foyle 2, R King 1, J Kelly 1, W Dunphy 1.	Referee: J Murphy (Limerick)

8 June 2019 Round 4	Antrim	0-21 (21) – (29) 0-29	Westmeath	Dunloy
15:00		(HT: 0-9 - 0-15)		Venue: Pearse Park
	Pts: N McManus 13 (12 frees, 1 65), J McNaughton 3, K Molloy 1, P Burke 1, N Elliott 1, E O'Neill 1, N McKeague 1 (65)	Report	Pts: K Doyle 17 (9 frees, 2 65s), R Greville 3, C Boyle 2, C Doyle 2, D McNicholas 1, A Devine 1, J Boyle 1, L Varley 1, D Clinton 1

==== Round 5 ====
15 June 2019 Round 5	Kerry	1-18 (21) – (19) 1-16	Offaly	Tralee
15:00				Venue: Austin Stack Park
	Gls: P Boyle 1 Pts: S Conway 11 (11f), J Conway 2, C Harty 2, P Boyle 1, P Kelly 1, J Goulding 1	Report	Gls: S Dooley 1 Pts: S Dooley 6 (6f), S Cleary 4, E Cahill 2 (2f), C Kiely 1, K Connolly 1, J Bergin 1, J Gorman 1	Referee: C Lyons (Cork); Attendance: 782

15 June 2019 Round 5	Laois	1-22 (25) – (25) 1-22	Westmeath	Portlaoise
15:00				Venue: O'Moore Park
	Gls: M Dowling 1 Pts: S Maher 7 (2f, 1'65), R King 4, J Kelly 3, E Gaughan 3 (1f), S Bergin 2, C Stapleton 1, E Rowland 1 (1f), M Whelan 1	Report	Gls: R Greville 1 Pts: K Doyle 10 (9f, 1'65), R Greville 2, D Clinton 4, J Boyle 2, G Greville 1, C Doyle 1, A Devine 1, A Clarke 1	Referee: P Murphy (Carlow)

== Final ==
30 June 2019
13:45
Joe McDonagh Cup Final

report

Laois	3-26 (35) – (24) 1-21	Westmeath
(HT: 2-11 - 1-10)
Gls: R King 1, A Dunphy 1, S Bergin 1. Pts: M Kavanagh (6f) 12, A Dunphy 4, E Lyons 3, J Lennon 2, C Dwyer 2, N Foyle 2, P Purcell 1.		Gls: K Doyle 1. Pts: K Doyle (6f) 11, C Doyle 2, S Clavin 1, A Clarke 1, C Boyle 1, A Devine 1, D McNicholas 1, L Varley 1, J Boyle 1, E Price 1.

Croke Park, Dublin
Referee: C Cunning (Antrim)

Laois are promoted to the 2020 Leinster Senior Hurling Championship.

== Stadia and locations ==
Five teams competed in the 2019 Joe McDonagh Cup - a reduction from six that competed in the inaugural competition.

Team	Location	Province	Stadium	Capacity
Antrim	Ballycastle		Páirc Mac Uílín	4,900
Kerry	Tralee		Austin Stack Park	12,000
Laois	Portlaoise		O'Moore Park	27,000
Offaly	Tullamore		O'Connor Park	20,000
Westmeath	Mullingar		Cusack Park	11,000

== Statistics ==
=== Top scorers ===
Overall

Rank	Player	County	Tally	Total	Matches	Average
1	Killian Doyle	Westmeath	3-61	70	5	14.00
2	Shane Conway	Kerry	0-44	44	4	11.00
3	Neil McManus	Antrim	1-30	33	4	8.25
4	Mark Kavanagh	Laois	0-30	30	3	10.00
5	Joe Bergin	Offaly	1-26	29	4	7.25
6	Cha Dwyer	Laois	2-13	19	4	4.75
7	Ross King	Laois	2-09	15	5	3.00
7	Aaron Dunphy	Laois	2-09	15	5	3.00
8	Oisín Kelly	Offaly	4-05	17	4	4.25
9	Keelan Molloy	Antrim	2-07	13	4	3.25
9	Pádraig Boyle	Kerry	2-07	13	4	4.25
9	Stephen Maher	Laois	0-13	13	3	4.33

Top scorers in a single game

Rank	Player	Club	Tally	Total	Opposition
1	Killian Doyle	Westmeath	0-17	17	Antrim
2	Killian Doyle	Westmeath	1-12	15	Offaly
3	Killian Doyle	Westmeath	1-11	14	Kerry
3	Killian Doyle	Westmeath	1-11	14	Laois
4	Neil McManus	Antrim	0-13	13	Westmeath
4	Shane Conway	Kerry	0-13	13	Westmeath
5	Mark Kavanagh	Laois	0-12	12	Westmeath
6	Joe Bergin	Offaly	0-11	11	Laois
6	Mark Kavanagh	Laois	0-11	11	Offaly
6	Shane Conway	Kerry	0-11	11	Offaly

=== Scoring Events ===
- Widest winning margin: 14 points
  - Antrim 3-19 - 0-14 Kerry (Round 1)
- Most goals in a match: 7
  - Offaly 3-21 - 4-22 Laois (Round 1)
  - Offaly 4-18 - 3-23 Antrim (Round 3)
- Most points in a match: 50
  - Antrim 0-21 - 0-29 Westmeath (Round 4)
- Most goals by one team in a match: 5
  - Kerry 1-21 - 5-17 Laois (Round 4)
- Most points by one team in a match: 29
  - Antrim 0-21 - 0-29 Westmeath (Round 4)
- Highest aggregate score: 64 points
  - Offaly 3-21 - 4-22 Laois (Round 1)
- Lowest aggregate score: 40 points
  - Kerry 1-18 - 1-16 Offaly (Round 5)

== Miscellaneous ==
- Westmeath become the first county to contest consecutive Joe McDonagh Cup finals.
- Laois won their 1st championship in 17 years, winning the 2002 All-Ireland Senior B Hurling Championship.
- Offaly hold the dubious distinction of being the only team to be relegated to hurling's third-tier, having previously been relegated from the tier-one Leinster championship, in successive seasons.
- First-time Joe McDonagh Cup meetings:
  - Offaly v Laois (Round 1)
  - Westmeath v Offaly (Round 2)
  - Offaly v Antrim (Round 3)
  - Kerry v Offaly (Round 5)
