= Carlow county hurling team =

Hurling team

Carlow
- Sport: Hurling
- Irish: Ceatharlach
- Nickname(s): The Barrowsiders
- County board: Carlow GAA
- Manager: Tom Mullally
- Home venue(s): Dr Cullen Park, Carlow

Recent competitive record
- Last championship title: None
- Current NHL Division: 1B (4th in 2025)
- Last league title: None
First colours	Second colours

The Carlow county hurling team represents Carlow in hurling and is governed by Carlow GAA, the county board of the Gaelic Athletic Association. The team competes in the Joe McDonagh Cup and the National Hurling League.

Carlow's home ground is Dr Cullen Park, Carlow. The team's manager is Tom Mullally.

The team has never won the Leinster Senior Championship, the All-Ireland Senior Championship or the National League.

== History ==
Carlow's last appearance in a Leinster Senior Hurling Championship (SHC) semi-final was in 1993, a game which Kilkenny won by 18 points. To date, this is Carlow's most recent appearance at that stage of the competition.

Carlow has won the Christy Ring Cup on three occasions. After losing the 2006 final to Antrim at Croke Park, the team defeated Westmeath by a scoreline of 3–22 to 4–16 (after extra time) in a classic 2008 final. This was Carlow's first "Division 2" win since 1992 – and a first in the re-arranged All-Ireland SHC structure, which saw four divisions in hurling from 2009.

Carlow repeated the feat the following year, defeating Down at Croke Park to win a second consecutive title and earn automatic promotion to tier one for the 2010 championship. Carlow played at that level until 2016, a year when the team was relegated from the Leinster Senior Hurling Championship. Carlow, however, won the 2017 Christy Ring Cup for a record-equalling third time, gaining promotion to a new competition, the 2018 Joe McDonagh Cup, which Carlow duly won, gaining promotion back to hurling's top tier and a chance to compete in the 2019 Leinster SHC, from which Carlow underwent relegation to the 2020 Joe McDonagh Cup, staying there until the 2023 Joe McDonagh Cup, which Carlow won, gaining promotion back to hurling's top tier and a chance to compete in the 2024 Leinster SHC.

On 11 May 2024, Carlow achieved an historic 1–20 – 1–20 draw with Kilkenny in the third round of the Leinster SHC. However, defeats in Rounds 1, 2, 4 and 5 brought relegation to the 2025 Joe McDonagh Cup.

On 2 February 2025, Carlow recorded a first ever senior hurling competitive victory over Waterford during their NHL 1B second round meeting at Dr Cullen Park.

== Management team ==
Management team confirmed on 3 February 2021:

- Manager: Tom Mullally (appointed 21 January 2021)
- Selectors: Chris Kealy, Joe Nolan, Pat Murphy
- Coaches: John Dermody, Paddy Mullally
- Liaison officer: Michael Whelan (continuing)

== Managerial history ==
Colm Bonnar left as manager in November 2020. Tom Mullally succeeded him, from January 2021.

== Players ==
=== Records ===
- Edward Coady (Mount Leinster Rangers) – Christy Ring Cup SH winner 2008, 2009 Christy Ring All Star winner, Leinster Hurling Club winner Intermediate, Carlow Hurler of the Year winner 2006, winner of first All-Ireland Club Hurling title in Carlow 2012. Leinster Senior Hurling Club Championship winner 2013 first Carlow club or team to win a Leinster Championship at Senior 2013.
- James Hickey (Mount Leinster Rangers) – Christy Ring Cup winner SH 2008, 2009 Christy Ring All Star winner, Leinster Hurling Club winner Intermediate, Carlow Hurler of the Year winner 2009 winner of first All-Ireland Club Hurling title in Carlow 2012. Leinster Senior Hurling Club Championship winner 2013 first Carlow club or team to Win a Leinster Championship at Senior 2013.
- Johnny Nevin (Old Leighlin GFC/Naomh Brid HC) - Railway Cup SF, SH, All-Ireland Senior B Football Championship 1994, Carlow Championship 1997, All-Ireland over-40s runner-up 2008
- Rory Dunbar (Carlow Town) – Christy Ring Cup winner 2009 2008 and Minor 2002.
- Des Murphy (Naomh Eoin, Myshall) – Christy Ring Cup SH 2008, all-time most SH appearances.
- Jim English (Erin's Own, Bagenalstown) – All-Ireland SHC 1947 (with Wexford), Railway Cup SH.
- Mark Mullins (Erin's Own, Bagenalstown) – All-Ireland Senior B Hurling Championship 1992, Cork SH captain 1995.
- Jim Treacy (St Mullins) – All-Ireland IHC 1961.
- Jamie McGrath (St Mullins) – County Championship 2001. Scored four goals to win game.
- Niall English (O'Hanrahan's GFC/Carlow Town HC) – All-Ireland Senior B Hurling Championship 1992.
- Shane Kavanagh (Naomh Eoin, Myshall) – Christy Ring Cup 2008, Railway Cup SH.
- Stephen Sheil (Kildavin/Clonegal) – Intermediate Hurling of the Year 1997 – played with the county from the age of 13 (1996 until 2004) He was rated one of the top defenders in the county and in all of Leinster. He won titles not only for County Carlow but also for County Wexford. He is the youngest of three boys, with Thomas and Derek also togging out in the county colours. Stephen's father Stephen Snr also played for Carlow in both hurling and football. After retiring from play, Sheil became involved in team management around Ireland.

==== Top scorers ====
Martin Kavanagh

=== Awards ===
- Champion 15:

2005: Pat Coady, Robert Foley
2006: Pat Coady^{2nd}, Des Murphy
2007: Andrew Gaul, Edward Coady
2008: Mark Brennan, John Rogers, Shane Kavanagh
2009: Andrew Gaul^{2nd}, Shane Kavanagh^{2nd}, John Rogers^{2nd}, James Hickey
2017: Alan Corcoran, John Michael Nolan, James Doyle, Richard Coady
2020: Brian Tracey, Chris Nolan
2021: Chris Nolan^{2nd}
2022: Martin Kavanagh, Chris Nolan^{3rd}
2023: Brian Tracey^{2nd}, Jack McCullagh, Diarmuid Byrne, James Doyle^{2nd}, Chris Nolan^{4th}, Paddy Boland, Martin Kavanagh^{2nd}
2025: Paul Doyle, Chris Nolan^{5th}, Martin Kavanagh^{3rd}

== Honours ==
=== National ===
- All-Ireland Senior Hurling Championship
  - Quarter-finalists (1): 1992
  - Preliminary quarter-finalists (1): 2018, 2023
- All-Ireland Senior B Hurling Championship
  - (gold) Winners (1): 1992
  - (silver) Runners-up (1): 1987
- Joe McDonagh Cup
  - (gold) Winners (1): 2018, 2023
- All-Ireland Intermediate Hurling Championship
  - (gold) Winners (1): 1962
- Christy Ring Cup
  - (gold) Winners (3): 2008, 2009, 2017
- National Hurling League Division 1B
  - (gold) Win vs Waterford (1): 2025
- National Hurling League Division 2A
  - (gold) Winners (2): 2012, 2018
- All-Ireland Under-21 B Championship
  - (gold) Winners (1): 2008
- All Ireland Minor B Hurling Championship
  - (gold) Winners (5): 1998, 2002, 2003, 2004, 2005

=== Provincial ===
- Leinster Intermediate Hurling Championship
  - (gold) Winners (1): 1962
- Leinster Junior Hurling Championship
  - (gold) Winners (2): 1906, 1970
- Leinster Minor B Hurling Championship
  - (gold) Winners (1): 1998
- Kehoe Cup Championship
  - (gold) Winners (6): 1986, 1990, 1992, 1999, 2005, 2006
