= 2018 Joe McDonagh Cup =

- Dates: 5 May 2018 – 1 July 2018
- Teams: 6
- Champions: Carlow (1st title); Richard Coady and Diarmuid Byrne (captain); Colm Bonnar (manager)
- Runners-up: Westmeath; Tommy Doyle (captain); Michael Ryan (manager)
- Relegated: Meath

Tournament statistics
- Matches played: 17
- Goals scored: 50 (2.94 per match)
- Points scored: 661 (38.88 per match)
- Top scorer(s): Neil McManus (3-67)

The 2018 Joe McDonagh Cup is the inaugural edition of the Joe McDonagh Cup since its establishment by the Gaelic Athletic Association and is the second-tier of Hurling for senior county teams (the All-Ireland Senior Hurling Championship is the first-tier trophy). It is contested by six GAA county teams ranked 11–16 in the 2018 All-Ireland Senior Hurling Championship. The fixtures were announced on 13 April 2018. The competition began on 5 May 2018.

On 1 July 2018, Carlow won the title following a 2-26 to 1-24 defeat of Westmeath in the final. This was their second successive promotion within the various tiers of hurling, as they were also the 2017 Christy Ring Cup champions.

Meath were relegated from the Joe McDonagh Cup after losing all of their group stage games.

Antrim's Neil McManus was the competition's top scorer with 3-67.

== Teams ==
A total of six teams compete in the Joe McDonagh Cup, with representatives from Leinster (4), Munster (1) and Ulster (1). As 2018 was the inaugural year, four of the teams ( Kerry, Laois, Meath and Westmeath) previously played in the qualifier group of the 2017 Leinster Championship (tier 1) and two teams (Antrim and Carlow) were the finalists in the 2017 Christy Ring Cup (then tier 2, re-classified as tier 3 for 2018).

=== General Information ===
County	Last Provincial title	Last All-Ireland title	Position in 2017 Championship	Appearance
Antrim	2017	—	Runners-up (Christy Ring Cup)	1st
Carlow	—	—	Champions (Christy Ring Cup)	1st
Kerry	1891	1891	Group Stage (Leinster SHC)	1st
Laois	1949	1915	Round 1 (All-Ireland SHC)	1st
Meath	—	—	Group Stage (Leinster SHC)	1st
Westmeath	—	—	Round 1 (All-Ireland SHC)	1st

=== Personnel and kits ===
County	Manager	Captain(s)	Sponsor
Antrim	Dominic McKinley and Terence McNaughton	Neil McManus	Creagh Concrete
Carlow	Colm Bonnar	Richard Coady	IT Carlow
Kerry	Fintan O'Connor	Pádraig Boyle	Kerry Group
Laois	Éamonn Kelly	Ross King	MW Hire Services
Meath	Nick Fitzgerald	James Kelly	Uniflu
Westmeath	Michael Ryan	Tommy Doyle	Renault

== Format ==
All six teams compete in an initial round-robin of five rounds where teams play each other once. The top two teams after the round robin stage play the third-placed teams in the Leinster and Munster championships in the two All-Ireland preliminary quarter finals with the Joe McDonagh Cup teams having home advantage.

The top two teams also compete in the Joe McDonagh Cup final. If the winner is a non-Munster team, they are automatically promoted to the following year's Leinster Championship. If the winner is a Munster team, in effect Kerry, they must win a play-off with the bottom-placed team in the Munster Championship to gain promotion to the following year's Munster Championship.

In order to reduce the number of teams in the Joe McDonagh Cup to five in 2019, the bottom-placed team in the Joe McDonagh Cup are automatically relegated to the following year's Christy Ring Cup and will not be replaced. The team that finishes second last in the 2018 Joe McDonagh Cup plays off against the 2018 Christy Ring Cup champions. The winner of that game plays in the Joe McDonagh Cup in 2019 and the losing team plays in the 2019 Christy Ring Cup.

== Group stage ==
=== Table ===
Pos	Team	Pld	W	D	L	SF	SA	Diff	Pts	Qualification
1	Carlow	5	4	0	1	122	102	20	8	Advance to Knockout Stage and All-Ireland Preliminary Quarter-Finals
2	Westmeath	5	4	0	1	130	115	15	8	Advance to Knockout Stage and All-Ireland Preliminary Quarter-Finals
3	Kerry	5	3	0	2	105	97	8	6	
4	Laois	5	2	0	3	118	123	-5	4	
5	Antrim	5	2	0	3	130	116	14	4	Advance to Relegation Playoff
6	Meath	5	0	0	5	94	146	-52	0	Relegated to Christy Ring Cup

=== Rounds 1 to 5 ===
==== Round 1 ====
5 May 2018 Round 1	Meath	2-18 - 5-25	Antrim	Páirc Tailteann, Navan
3:00 pm	J Regan (0-12, 0-8 f, 0-2 '65'), G McGowan (1-2), A Douglas (1-1), C McCabe, P Conneely, S Quigley (0-1 each).	Report	N Elliott (3-2), C Johnston (2-4 ,1-0 penalty), N McManus (0-8, 0-6f), S McCrory (0-3), J Maskey and D McKinley (0-2 each), C Carson, M Armstrong, E Campbell and C McCann (0-1 each).	Referee: C McAllister (Cork)

5 May 2018 Round 1	Laois	1-21 - 2-21	Westmeath	O'Moore Park, Portlaoise
3:00 pm	R King (0-10, 0-09 frees 0-01 ‘65), N Foyle (1-02), C Dwyer (0-04), B Conroy, A Corby, P Purcell, W Dunphy, S Maher (0-01 each).	Report	N O’Brien (0-07, 0-04 frees), R Greville (1-03), N Mitchell (1-00), C Boyle, J Boyle (0-03 each), E Price, C Doyle (0-02 each), D McNicholas (0-01, free).	Referee: P Murphy (Carlow)

6 May 2018 Round 1	Carlow	0-21 - 0-18	Kerry	Dr. Cullen Park, Carlow
2:00 pm	D Murphy 0-6 (5f), E Byrne 0-4, J Doyle 0-3, K McDonald 0-2, D English (f), C Nolan, P Coady, D Byrne, R Smithers, J Kavanagh 0-1 each. Kerry:	Report	P Boyle 0-7 (1f), S Conway 0-6 (f), J Goulding 0-4, C Harty 0-1.	Referee: J Heffernan (Wexford)

==== Round 2 ====
12 May 2018 Round 2	Antrim	2-16 - 0-19	Carlow	Corrigan Park, Belfast
	N McManus 1-8 (7f), N Elliott 1-2, C Johnston 0-2 (1f), J Maskey, E Campbell, M Armstrong, and E McCloskey 0-1 each.	Report	D Murphy 0-11 (8f), JM Nolan (1 sideline), J Doyle, C Nolan and C Foley 0-2 each.	Referee: J O'Brien (Laois)

13 May 2018 Round 2	Westmeath	4-24 - 2-17	Meath	Cusack Park, Mullingar
	A Devine 2-2 (0-2fs), A Clarke 0-7, E Price, N O'Brien (2fs) 0-5 each, R Greville 1-1, C Doyle 0-3, N Mitchell 1-0, D McNicholas 0-1.	Report	J Regan 1-2 (0-2fs), A Douglas 1-1, P Conneely (1f), J Kelly, D Kelly (2fs) 0-3 each, C McCabe, M O'Sullivan 0-2 each, S Quigley 0-1.	Referee: C Cunning (Antrim)

13 May 2018 Round 2	Kerry	3-20 - 0-19	Laois	Austin Stack Park, Tralee
	S Conway 0-09 (0-07f), J Goulding 1-02 (0-1 sideline), S Nolan 1-02, B O’Leary 1-00, S Weir 0-02, B Murphy 0-01, B Barrett 0-01, D Griffin 0-01, B O'Mahony 0-01, M O'Connor 0-01.	Report	R King 0-08 (0-06f, 0-02 '65'), B Conroy 0-05, W Dunphy 0-01, S Maher 0-01, P Purcell 0-01, C Taylor 0-01, C Dwyer 0-01, PJ Scully 0-01.	Referee: D Hughes (Carlow)

==== Round 3 ====
19 May 2018 Round 3	Carlow	0-21 - 1-14	Meath	Dr. Cullen Park, Carlow
	D Murphy 0-8 (8fs), C Nolan 0-6 (1f), J Doyle 0-3, P Coady, E Byrne, R Kelly and D English (1f) 0-1 each.	Report	P Conneely 1-7 (6fs), G McGowan 0-3, A Gannon 0-2, A Douglas and S Brennan 0-1 each.	Referee: J Keane (Galway)

19 May 2018 Round 3	Antrim	1-19 - 1-20	Laois	Pearse Park, Dunloy
	N McManus 0-11 (9 fs, 1 65), C Johnston 0-3, C Clarke 1-0, E McCloskey 0-1, N Elliott 0-1, J McNaughton 0-1, D McKinley 0-1, C McCann 0-1.	Report	R King 0-11 (10 frees), B Conroy 0-4, W Dunphy 1-1, P Purcell 0-2, C Dwyer 0-1, A Corby 0-1.	Referee: J Heffernan (Wexford)

20 May 2018 Round 3	Kerry	0-15 - 2-12	Westmeath	Austin Stack Park, Tralee
	D Griffin, P Boyle and S Conway (2f) 0-3 each, B O'Mahony 0-2, J O'Connor, S Nolan, J Goulding and J Conway 0-1 each.	Report	A Devine 0-7 (6f), N O'Brien 1-2, D Clinton 1-0, J Boyle, C Boyle, and A Clarke 0-1 each. Kerry:	Referee: C McAllister (Cork)

==== Round 4 ====
2 June 2018 Round 4	Meath	0-16 - 0-18	Kerry	Páirc Tailteann, Navan
	P Conneely (0-7 three frees), J Keena (0-2), K Keoghan (0-2), A Gannon (0-2), J Kelly (0-1), J Regan (0-1), S Brennan (0-1).	Report	S Conway (0-6 two frees, two '65s'), P Boyle (0-4), M Stackpoole (0-1 free), B Murphy (0-1), B Barrett (0-2), D Collins (0-1), B O'Leary (0-1), M Boyle (0-1), J Goulding (0-1).	Referee: S Hynes (Galway)

2 June 2018 Round 4	Laois	2-15 - 2-25	Carlow	O'Moore Park, Portlaoise
	S Maher 0-8 (five frees, three 65s), R Mullaney 1-3, E Rowland 1-0 (1-0 pen), N Foyle, C Taylor, W Dunphy and M Kavanagh 0-1 each.	Report	JM Nolan 0-6 (one sideline), D Murphy (all frees) and C Nolan 0-5 each, D Byrne and E Byrne 1-1 each, P Coady 0-3, J Doyle 0-1 and K McDonald 0-1 each.

2 June 2018 Round 4	Westmeath	2-19 - 1-20	Antrim	TEG Cusack Park, Mullingar
	A Devine 0-7 (3fs, 365s), C Doyle and N O’Brien 1-2 each, N Mitchell 0-3, L Varley 0-2, P Greville, A Clarke, R Greville 0-1 each.	Report	N McManus 0-13 (7fs), K Molloy 1-0, C McCann 0-2, P Burke, J Dillon, N Elliott, E Campbell, and C Johnston 0-1 each.	Referee: R McGann (Clare)

==== Round 5 ====
9 June 2018 Round 5	Meath	0-14 - 3-23	Laois	Páirc Tailteann, Navan
	J Kelly 0-4, P Conneely 0-4 (2fs), J Regan 0-3 (1f), J Toher 0-1, C McCabe 0-1, S Morris 0-1.	Report	B Conroy 1-5, C Dwyer 1-3, R King 0-6 (3fs, 265s), P Purcell 1-2, W Dunphy 0-2, S Maher 0-2 (1f), N Foyle 0-1, R Mullaney 0-1, E Lyons 0-1.	Referee: P Burke (Kilkenny)

9 June 2018 Round 5	Carlow	3-21 - 1-21	Westmeath	Netwatch Cullen Park, Carlow
	D Murphy 0-10 (5f, 1 “65”), J Doyle 3-1 (1 “pen”), C Nolan 0-3, J Kavanagh and P Coady 0-2 each, E Byrne, JM Nolan and B Tracey (1f) 0-1 each.	Report	N O’Brien 0-6 (4f), A Clarke 0-4, S Clavin 0-3, N Mitchell 1-0, J Boyle, E Price and D Clinton 0-2 each, P Greville and J Gilligan 0-1 each.	Referee: C Cunning (Antrim)

9 June 2018 Round 5	Antrim	1-20 - 2-21	Kerry	Páirc Mhuire, Cushendall
	N McManus 0-17 (10 fs, 1 65), C Clarke 1-0, C McCann 0-1, D McKinley 0-1, C Johnston 0-1.		S Conway 0-12 (11 fs, 1 65), M Boyle 1-2, J Goulding 1-1, P Boyle 0-2, D Griffin 0-1, B O'Leary 0-1, B Barrett 0-1, T O'Connor 0-1.	Referee: P Murphy (Carlow)

== Final ==
1 July 2018
1:45 pm
Final

Westmeath	1-24 - 2-26	Carlow
A Devine 0-8f, E Price 0-6, A Clarke 0-3, N O’Brien 1-1, R Greville 0-2, D McNicholas 0-2 (1f), D Clinton 0-1, N Mitchell 0-1.	Report	D Murphy 0-10 (9f, 1’ 45), C Nolan 1-4, P Coady 0-4, J Doyle 1-1, JM Nolan 0-3, E Byrne 0-2, K McDonald 0-1, D Byrne 0-1.

Croke Park, Dublin
Referee: C McAllister (Cork)

Carlow are promoted to the 2019 Leinster Senior Hurling Championship.

== Relegation/promotion playoff ==
The bottom team after the round robin games, Meath, were relegated to the 2019 Christy Ring Cup. The second-last team in the Joe McDonagh Cup (tier 2), Antrim, defeated Kildare, the winners of the 2018 Christy Ring Cup final (tier 3) and thereby retained their place in the Joe McDonagh Cup for the 2019 edition.

30 June 2018
Relegation/Promotion

Antrim	3-23 - 1-17	Kildare
N McManus 2-10 (6f, one ’65′); K Molloy 0-6; C McCann 1-1; N Elliott 0-2; R McCambridge, E O’Neill, E McCloskey and J Dillon 0-1 each.	Report	P Divilly 1-6 (2f); J Burke 0-6 (5f); B Deay 0-2; C Bonus, K Whelan and É O'Neill 0-1 each.

Athletic Grounds
Referee: D Hughes (Carlow)

== Stadia and locations ==
County	Location	Province	Stadium(s)	Capacity
Neutral venue	Dublin	Leinster	Croke Park	82,300
Antrim	Belfast	Ulster	Corrigan Park	3,700
Carlow	Carlow	Leinster	Dr Cullen Park	21,000
Kerry	Tralee	Munster	Austin Stack Park	12,000
Laois	Portlaoise	Leinster	O'Moore Park	27,000
Meath	Navan	Leinster	Páirc Tailteann	11,000
Westmeath	Mullingar	Leinster	Cusack Park	11,000

== Statistics ==
=== Top scorers ===
Overall

Rank	Player	County	Tally	Total	Matches	Average
1	Neil McManus	Antrim	3-67	76	6	12.66
2	Denis Murphy	Carlow	0-50	50	6	8.33
3	Shane Conway	Kerry	0-36	36	5	7.20
4	Ross King	Laois	0-35	35	4	8.75
5	Niall O'Brien	Westmeath	3-23	32	6	5.33
6	Allan Devine	Westmeath	2-24	30	5	6.00
7	Patrick Conneely	Meath	1-22	25	5	5.00
8	Chris Nolan	Carlow	1-21	24	6	4.00
9	James Doyle	Carlow	4-11	23	6	3.83
10	Jack Regan	Meath	1-18	21	5	4.20

In a single game

Rank	Player	Club	Tally	Total	Opposition
1	Neil McManus	Antrim	0-17	17	Kerry
2	Neil McManus	Antrim	0-13	13	Westmeath
3	Shane Conway	Kerry	0-12	12	Antrim
3	Jack Regan	Meath	0-12	12	Antrim
5	Nigel Elliott	Antrim	3-02	11	Meath
5	Neil McManus	Antrim	1-08	11	Carlow
5	Denis Murphy	Carlow	0-11	11	Antrim
5	Neil McManus	Antrim	0-11	11	Laois
5	Ross King	Laois	0-11	11	Antrim
10	Conor Johnston	Antrim	2-04	10	Meath
10	Patrick Conneely	Meath	1-07	10	Carlow
10	Ross King	Laois	0-10	10	Westmeath
10	Denis Murphy	Carlow	0-10	10	Westmeath
10	Denis Murphy	Carlow	0-10	10	Westmeath

=== Scoring Events ===
- Widest winning margin: 16 points
  - Meath 2-18 - 5-25 Antrim (Round 1)
- Most goals in a match: 7
  - Meath 2-18 - 5-25 Antrim (Round 1)
- Most points in a match: 50
  - Westmeath 1-24 - 2-26 Carlow (Final)
- Most goals by one team in a match: 5
  - Meath 2-18 - 5-25 Antrim (Round 1)
- Most points by one team in a match: 26
  - Westmeath 1-24 - 2-26 Carlow (Final)
- Highest aggregate score: 64 points
  - Meath 2-18 - 5-25 Antrim (Round 1)
- Lowest aggregate score: 33 points
  - Kerry 0-15 - 2-12 Westmeath (Round 3)

== Miscellaneous ==
- Carlow become the first county to win the Joe McDonagh Cup.
- Carlow won their 2nd championship in a row after winning the 2017 Christy Ring Cup.
- Westmeath's round 1 victory over Laois was their first win against the O'Moore county in championship hurling since 1968.

== See also ==
- 2018 All-Ireland Senior Hurling Championship
- 2018 Christy Ring Cup
- 2018 Nicky Rackard Cup
- 2018 Lory Meagher Cup
