= Corrigan Park =

Sports ground in Antrim

- Pairc Uí Chorragáin
- Location within Greater Belfast
- Address: Whiterock Road, Belfast
- Location: Northern Ireland
- Coordinates: 54.59237°N 5.97736°W
- Owner: St John's
- Capacity: 2,100 (2021); 3,700 (600 seated) (2021–present)
- Surface: Grass

Construction
- Opened: 12 September 1926
- Renovated: 2001; 2020–2021
- Expanded: 2020–2021

Tenant
- Antrim GAA

Corrigan Park is a Gaelic games ground on the Whiterock Road in west Belfast that served as the main venue for GAA in Belfast until the opening of Casement Park in 1953. It is named in honour of John Corrigan (1881–1916), who was secretary of the Antrim County Board when Antrim won Ulster Senior Hurling Championship titles between 1909 and 1913.

It is home to St John's GAA club and also hosts Ulster club and colleges matches.

== History ==
=== Development ===
The ground was officially opened in 1926. In the late 1920s, additional improvements were built at the ground, including a new stand, player facilities and an entrance from Whiterock Road. While, following the opening of Casement Park in 1953, it was suggested that the county board might sell Corrigan Park, control of the ground was transferred to St John's GAA club. The club undertook a number of developments at the ground in the 1950s and 1970s.

In 2021, following extensive renovations which included the construction of a 600-seat stand and terracing, the capacity of the park increased from 2,100 to 3,700.

=== Hurling ===
Corrigan Park was associated with the run of the Antrim hurling team to the final of the 1943 All-Ireland Senior Hurling Championship. The ground staged the quarter-final in which Antrim beat Galway and the semi-final in which Antrim beat Kilkenny, both unexpected results at the time. Its tight, confined space was regarded as being advantageous to the home side in those matches.

=== Football ===
Among the major football championship matches it staged were the Cavan-Antrim Ulster championship semi-finals of 1930, 1931 and 1949. Its last major provincial football championship match was Antrim v Donegal in the Ulster championship of 1952.

Corrigan Park also hosted Antrim's Round 2 Qualifier defeat to Kildare in the 2019 All-Ireland Senior Football Championship.

=== Camogie ===
Corrigan Park staged the All Ireland Camogie finals of 1944, 1946, and 1947, two of which were won by Antrim, and also several of Antrim's semi-finals. It became known as the "home of camogie" during this period.
