= Ireland national hurling team =

National hurling team of Ireland

Ireland
- Union: Gaelic Athletic Association
- Ground(s): Croke Park, Dublin
- Coach(es): Michael Kavanagh; Terence McNaughton
- Captain: Enda Rowland
Team kit

First international
- Scotland 2 – 1 Ireland (Republic of Ireland) (Dublin, Ireland; 2 August 1924)

Largest win
- (Republic of Ireland) Ireland 8–11 – 4–3 Scotland (Ennis, Ireland; 27 October 2012)

Largest defeat
- Scotland 5–11 – 0–4 Ireland (Republic of Ireland) (Abbotstown, Ireland; 2 November 2019)

The Ireland national hurling team is a representative team for the island of Ireland in the hybrid sport of composite rules shinty–hurling.

The team dates from 1924 when Ireland competed at the Aonach Tailteann against national hurling teams from several countries. However, at present the only team it plays is the Scotland national shinty team, on an annual basis in the Shinty–Hurling International Series.

The team comprises a mixture of hurlers who compete in the All-Ireland Senior Hurling Championship, as well as players of county teams competing in the Christy Ring and Nicky Rackard Cups. The managers of the senior men's team during the most recent series in 2024 were Michael Kavanagh and Terence McNaughton, with Enda Rowland of Laois as captain.

== History ==
=== Aonach Tailteann ===
The first international hurling competition to be held was at the Aonach Tailteann in 1924. Teams from Ireland, the United States, England, Scotland, and Wales participated in the hurling tournament. The Scotland national shinty team also participated in the games, inflicting a surprise 2–1 defeat of Ireland on the opening day of the games. However, Ireland won all of its matches in the hurling tournament. At the 1928 Aonach Tailteann, Ireland and the United States were the only participants in the hurling tournament, with Ireland securing a 5-9 to 4-3 victory. The final Aonach Tailteann in 1932 saw four teams competing; Ireland, the United States, Great Britain, and South Africa.

=== International shinty–hurling matches ===
On 14 October 1933, representatives of the Gaelic Athletic Association and the Camanachd Association agreed to new rules governing international matches. An international compromise rules match was planned for Easter of the following year. However, the Camanachd Association broke off its links with the GAA following pressure from the British government.

As a result of continued Camanachd Association opposition to links with the GAA, the next full international between Ireland and Scotland would not be held until 1972. On 5 August 1972, Ireland defeated Scotland by 6-4 to 4-5 at Bught Park, Inverness. Further internationals were held each year during the 1970s, apart from 1975. No full internationals were played between 1980 and 1987, but in 1988 the series was revived.

=== Combined Universities v (Rest of) Ireland matches ===
During the 1950s, a number of exhibition matches were played between an Ireland representative team and Combined Universities, representing third level institutions.

== Squads ==
=== 2006 ===
- 1 Graham Clarke
- 2 Geoffrey Bermingham
- 3 Declan Coulter
- 4 Clement Cunniffe
- 5 Kieran Divilly
- 6 Paul Gannon
- 7 Andrew Gaul
- 8 James Glancy
- 9 John Griffin
- 10 Michael Kettle
- 11 Tom Lennon
- 12 Paul McCormack
- 13 Kevin McGarry
- 14 Ray Mulry

Subs:

- Michael O'Neill
- Paudie Reidy
- Gary Savage
- Des Shaw

Coach: Seán Silke

- (Team at 5 November 2006 versus Scotland)

=== 2008 ===
Source for squad announcement:

- 1 Graham Clarke (Down)
- 2 Des Shaw (Carlow)
- 3 Edward Coady (Carlow)
- 4 Tommy Walsh (Kilkenny)
- 5 Shane Cavanagh (Carlow, capt)
- 6 Geoffrey Bermingham (Wicklow)
- 7 Dermot Clarke (Sligo)
- 8 Seán Óg Ó hAilpín (Cork)
- 9 Derek Lyng (Kilkenny)
- 10 Paul Braniff (Down)
- 11 Michael Burke (Meath)
- 12 Eddie Brennan (Kilkenny)
- 13 Brendan McGourty (Down)
- 14 Brendan Murtagh (Westmeath)

Substitutes:

- John Shaw (Westmeath)
- James Glancy (Leitrim)
- Stephen Kelly (Wicklow)
- Michael Gilmartin (Sligo)
- Declan Coulter

Coach: Lester Ryan

- (Team versus Scotland at Nowlan Park; 18 October 2008 at 15:00)

=== 2010 ===
- 1 Paul Dermody
- 2 Arron Graffin
- 3 Darren McCormack
- 4 Tom Murnane
- 5 Jackie Tyrrell
- 6 Eoin Nolan
- 7 Tommy Walsh (c)
- 8 Neil McManus
- 9 Willie Hyland
- 10 Gareth Johnston
- 11 Shane Dooley
- 12 Barry McFall
- 13 Brendan Murtagh
- 14 John Rowney

Subs
Steven Clynch
Paul McCormack
Patrick Horgan
Andrew O'Brien
Jackie Tyrrell

Manager
Joe Dooley

=== 2011 ===
- 1 Patrick Mullaney
- 2 Joe Bergin
- 3 Kieran Divilly
- 4 Cormac Donnelly
- 5 John Doran
- 6 Aaron Griffin
- 7 Willie Hyland
- 8 Eoin Kelly
- 9 David Kennedy
- 10 Damian Maguire
- 11 Brendan Maher
- 12 Shane Morley
- 13 Tom Murnane
- 14 Brendan Murtagh
- 15 Eoin Nolan
- 16 Andy O'Brien
- 17 Eoin Price
- 18 Michael Rice (c)

Managers
Joe Dooley
Kevin Ryan
Jim McKernan

=== 2012 ===
- 1 Bernard Rochford
- 2 Joseph Clarke
- 3 Ciarán Clifford
- 4 Steven Clynch
- 5 Shane Dooley
- 6 Cormac Donnelly
- 7 Shane Fennell
- 8 Patrick Horgan
- 9 Neil McManus
- 10 Barry McFall
- 11 Tom Murnane
- 12 Brendan Murtagh
- 13 Darragh O'Connell
- 14 Shane O'Neill
- 15 Eoin Price (c)
- 16 Paudie Reidy
- 17 Des Shaw
- 18 Tommy Walsh

Joint managers
John Meyler
Michael Walsh

=== 2013 ===
- 1 Bernard Rochford
- 2 Danny Cullen
- 3 Paul Divilly
- 4 David English
- 5 Arron Graffin
- 6 Cahir Healy
- 7 Richie Hogan
- 8 Gareth Johnson
- 9 Jack Kavanagh
- 10 Brendan Maher
- 11 Patrick Maher
- 12 Kieran McKiernan
- 13 Neil McManus (c)
- 14 Derek McNicholas
- 15 Darragh O'Connell
- 16 Eoin Reilly
- 17 Shane O'Neill
- 18 Eoin Price
- 19 Conor Woods

Joint managers
John Meyler
Michael Walsh

=== 2014 ===
- 1 Eoin Reilly
- 2 Mickey Burke
- 3 Paul Dermody
- 4 Paul Divilly
- 5 John Egan
- 6 David English
- 7 Patrick Horgan
- 8 Conor Lehane
- 9 Patrick Maher
- 10 Conor McCann
- 11 Neal McAuley
- 12 Jonny McCusker
- 13 David McInerney
- 14 Brian Murphy
- 15 Shane Nolan
- 16 Darragh O'Connell
- 17 Eoin Price
- 18 Matthew Whelan
- 19 David Kettle

Manager
Michael Walsh

=== 2018 ===
- 1 Enda Rowland
- 2 Brian Byrne
- 3 Damian Casey
- 4 John Casey
- 5 Darragh Clinton
- 6 Noel Connors
- 7 Danny Cullen
- 8 Tommy Doyle
- 9 Darragh Egerton
- 10 David English
- 11 Jason Forde
- 12 Damien Healy
- 13 Gerard O'Kelly-Lynch
- 14 Gavin McGowan
- 15 David McInerney
- 16 Bryan Murphy
- 17 John Michael Nolan
- 18 Stephen Roche
- 19 James Toher
- 20 Seán Weir

Manager
William Maher

=== 2019 ===
- Brian Tracey
- Mikey Boyle
- Joey Boyle
- Damian Casey
- Danny Cullen
- Mark Delaney
- Paul Divilly
- Michael Doyle
- Willie Dunphy
- Cillian Egan
- Alan Grant
- Damien Healy
- Cillian Kiely
- Shane McGovern
- Ryan Mullaney
- Shane Nolan
- Gerard O'Kelly-Lynch
- Keith Raymond
- Caolan Taggart
- Seán Whelan

Managers

- Willie Maher
- Conor Phelan

=== 2023 ===
- Niall Arthur
- Mickey Joe Egan
- David Fitzgerald
- Peter Duggan
- Andrew Gilsenan-Kavanagh
- Cillian Kiely
- Eoghan Cahill
- Fionan Mackessy
- Luca McCusker
- Neil McManus
- Chris Nolan
- Ryan Mullaney
- Stephen Maher
- Paddy Purcell
- Enda Rowland,
- Padraig Walsh
- Ben Conneely
- Ger Millerick
- Rob Downey
- Tom Monaghan

Manager

- Damien Coleman

=== 2024 ===
- Enda Rowland
- Luca McCusker
- Eoghan Cahill
- Caolan Taggart
- Eoin Cody
- Ben Conneely
- Steven McBride
- Cian Darcy
- Cianan Fahy
- Martin Keoghan,
- Tomás Keyes
- Dan Morrissey
- Tom Morrissey
- Killian Sampson
- Jason Sampson
- Daithí Sands
- James Toher
- Gerard Walsh
- Aidan McCarthy
- Shane Meehan

Managers

- Michael Kavanagh
- Terence 'Sambo' McNaughton

=== 2025 ===
- Dan Morrissey
- Cianan Fahy
- Paddy Burke
- Ger Walsh
- Shane O'Brien
- Eoin Murphy
- Eoghan Connolly
- Darragh McCarthy
- Alan Tynan
- Podge Delaney
- Cha Dwyer
- Ben Conroy
- James Doyle
- Marty Kavanagh
- Andrew Kavanagh
- David Dooley
- Donal Hughes
- Kevin McDonald
- Nicky Potterton
- Mark Cunningham

Managers

- Michael Kavanagh
- Terence 'Sambo' McNaughton
- Damien Coleman
- Joe O'Leary
- Kevin O'Brien

=== 2026 ===
- Billy Nolan
- Mikey Butler
- Ian Shanahan
- Sam O'Farrell
- Meehaul McGrath
- Ryan Mullaney
- Darragh Neary
- Fiachra C-Fennell
- Diarmuid Stritch
- Aaron Dunphy
- Andrew Ormonde
- Cian O'Sullivan
- Luca McCusker
- Séamus Harnedy
- Pearse Óg McCrickard
- Gerard Walsh
- Joe Murray
- Patrick Turner
- Kyle O'Connor
- Damien Healy
- Seán Kelly
- Johnny Maher
- Ciaran McNally
- Ethan Flynn
- Evan Tully
- Pádraig Doyle

Manager

- Eamon O'Shea

== Match results ==
Date	Opponent	Venue	Result	Score	Note(s)
2 August 1924	Scotland	Croke Park, Dublin	Loss	1-0 – 2-0	1924 Aonach Tailteann
3 August 1924	United States	Croke Park, Dublin	Win	4-3 – 1-3	1924 Aonach Tailteann
4 August 1924	England	Croke Park, Dublin	Win	9-3 – 4-7	1924 Aonach Tailteann
8 August 1924	Wales	Croke Park, Dublin	Win	5-4 – 2-6	1924 Aonach Tailteann
9 August 1924	Scotland	Croke Park, Dublin	Win	10-1 – 4-5	1924 Aonach Tailteann
10 August 1924	United States	Croke Park, Dublin	Win	4-6 – 3-2	1924 Aonach Tailteann
12 August 1928	United States	Croke Park, Dublin	Win	5-9 – 4-3	1928 Aonach Tailteann
29 June 1932	Scotland	Croke Park, Dublin	Win	6-0 – 1-0	1932 Aonach Tailteann
3 July 1932	United States	Croke Park, Dublin	Win	9-7 – 3-6	1932 Aonach Tailteann
2 March 1952	Combined Universities	Croke Park, Dublin	Win	3-14 – 1-6	
1 March 1953	Combined Universities	Croke Park, Dublin	Win	5-9 – 3-2	
7 March 1954	Combined Universities	Croke Park, Dublin	Win	3-13 – 1-4	
6 March 1955	Combined Universities	Croke Park, Dublin	Loss	2-4 – 2-6	
18 March 1956	Combined Universities	Croke Park, Dublin	Win	4-12 – 3-6	
5 August 1972	Scotland	Bught Park, Inverness	Win	6-4 – 4-5	
19 May 1973	Scotland	Croke Park, Dublin	Win	2-15 – 2-7	
20 October 2018	Scotland	Bught Park, Inverness	Loss	1-9 – 1-11	
2 November 2019	Scotland	National Games Development Centre, Dublin	Loss	0-4 – 5-11	
21 October 2023	Scotland	Páirc Esler, Newry	Win	0-22 – 2-8	
26 October 2024	Scotland	Cusack Park, Ennis	Win	3-16 – 5-7 (a.e.t.)	
25 October 2025	Scotland	Bught Park, Inverness	Win	3-3 - 2-4	
24 October 2026	Scotland	Páirc Uí Chaoimh, Cork	Loss	4-12 - 2-17	

== See also ==
- Scotland national shinty team
- Shinty–Hurling International Series
- Ireland international rules football team
