= 2012 All-Ireland Senior Hurling Championship =

Championship details
- Dates: 19 May – 30 September 2012
- Teams: 14

All-Ireland champions
- Winning team: Kilkenny (34th win)
- Captain: Eoin Larkin
- Manager: Brian Cody

All-Ireland Finalists
- Losing team: Galway
- Captain: Fergal Moore
- Manager: Anthony Cunningham

Provincial champions
- Munster: Tipperary
- Leinster: Galway
- Ulster: Not Played
- Connacht: Not Played

Championship statistics
- No. matches played: 26
- Goals total: 96 (3.69 per game)
- Points total: 894 (34.38 per game)
- Top Scorer: Henry Shefflin (3–56)
- Player of the Year: Henry Shefflin
- All-Star Team: See here

The 2012 All-Ireland Senior Hurling Championship was the 125th staging of the All-Ireland hurling championship since its establishment by the Gaelic Athletic Association in 1887. The draw for the 2012 fixtures took place on 6 October 2011. The championship began on 19 May 2012 and ended on 30 September 2012.

Kilkenny were the defending champions and successfully retained their title following a 3–22 to 3–11 victory over Galway in a replay of the final.

== Teams ==
A total of fourteen teams contested the championship, including all of the teams from the 2011 championship. There were no new teams entering the championship.

Laois and Westmeath were the first teams to exit the 2011 championship, however, there was no relegation play-off. Both teams contested the 2012 championship.

Kerry, the winners of the 2011 Christy Ring Cup, declined their automatic right to promotion to the championship. They instead contested the Christy Ring Cup once again.

=== General information ===
Fourteen counties will compete in the All-Ireland Senior Hurling Championship: nine teams in the Leinster Senior Hurling Championship and five teams in the Munster Senior Hurling Championship.

| County | Last provincial title | Last championship title | Position in 2011 Championship | Appearance |
|---|---|---|---|---|
| Antrim | 2011 | — | Qualifiers Phase 3 | |
| Carlow | — | — | Qualifiers Phase 1 | |
| Clare | 1998 | 1997 | Qualifiers Phase 2 | |
| Cork | 2006 | 2005 | Qualifiers Phase 3 | |
| Dublin | 1961 | 1938 | Semi-finals | |
| Galway | 1999 | 1988 | Quarter-finals | |
| Kilkenny | 2011 | 2011 | Champions | |
| Laois | 1949 | 1915 | Qualifiers preliminary round | |
| Limerick | 1996 | 1973 | Quarter-finals | |
| Offaly | 1995 | 1998 | Qualifiers Phase 1 | |
| Tipperary | 2011 | 2010 | Runners-up | |
| Waterford | 2007 | 1959 | Semi-finals | |
| Westmeath | — | — | Qualifiers preliminary round | |
| Wexford | 2004 | 1996 | Qualifiers Phase 2 | |

=== Team summaries ===
==== Stadiums and locations ====
| Team | Location | Stadium | Stadium capacity |
| Antrim | Belfast | Casement Park | 32,500 |
| Carlow | Carlow | Dr. Cullen Park | 21,000 |
| Clare | Ennis | Cusack Park | 14,864 |
| Cork | Cork | Páirc Uí Chaoimh | 43,550 |
| Dublin | Dublin | Parnell Park | 13,500 |
| Galway | Galway | Pearse Stadium | 26,197 |
| Kilkenny | Kilkenny | Nowlan Park | 24,000 |
| Laois | Portlaoise | O'Moore Park | 27,000 |
| Limerick | Limerick | Gaelic Grounds | 49,866 |
| Offaly | Tullamore | O'Connor Park | 20,000 |
| Tipperary | Thurles | Semple Stadium | 53,500 |
| Waterford | Waterford | Walsh Park | 17,000 |
| Westmeath | Mullingar | Cusack Park | 11,000 |
| Wexford | Wexford | Wexford Park | 20,000 |

==== Personnel and kits ====
| Team | Colours | Sponsor | Captain | Vice-captain(s) | Manager(s) |
|---|---|---|---|---|---|---|---|---|---|---|---|
| Team | Colours | Sponsor | Captain | Vice-captain(s) | Manager(s) | Antrim | Saffron and white | Creagh Concrete | Damien Quinn | Michael Herron | Jerry Wallis |
| Carlow | Red, green and yellow | Dan Morrissey Ltd. | Shane Kavanagh; Edward Coady | | Kevin Ryan |
| Clare | Saffron and blue | Pat O'Donnell | Pat Donnellan | Nicky O'Connell; Fergal Lynch | Davy Fitzgerald |
| Cork | Red and white | O_{2} | Donal Óg Cusack | Patrick Horgan | Jimmy Barry-Murphy |
| Dublin | Navy and blue | Vodafone | John McCaffrey | | Anthony Daly |
| Galway | Maroon and white | Supermac's | Fergal Moore | | Anthony Cunningham |
| Kilkenny | Black and amber | Glanbia | Eoin Larkin | | Brian Cody |
| Laois | Blue and white | MW Hire Services | Willie Hyland | | Teddy McCarthy |
| Limerick | Green and white | Sporting Limerick | David Breen | | John Allen |
| Offaly | Green, white and gold | Carroll Cuisine | David Kenny | | Ollie Baker |
| Tipperary | Blue and gold | Škoda Auto | Paul Curran | Pádraic Maher | Declan Ryan |
| Waterford | White and blue | 3 | Michael Walsh | | Michael Ryan |
| Westmeath | Maroon and white | Annabrook Hotel | Paddy Dowdall | Philip Gilsenan | Brian Hanley |
| Wexford | Purple and yellow | Sports Savers | Keith Rossiter | | Liam Dunne |

== The Championship ==
=== Format ===
The All-Ireland Senior Hurling Championship of 2012 will be run on a provincial basis as usual. It will be a knockout tournament with pairings drawn at random in the respective provinces – there will be no seeds.

Each match will be played as a single leg. If a match is drawn there will be a replay. If that match ends in a draw a period of extra time will be played, however, if both sides are still level at the end of extra time another replay will take place.

Leinster Championship

Preliminary Round: (2 matches) These will be two matches between four of the 'weaker' teams from the province. The two winning teams will advance to the quarter-finals while the two losing teams will enter the All-Ireland qualifiers.

Quarter-finals: (3 matches) The winners of the two preliminary round games will join the other four Leinster teams to make up three quarter-final pairings. The three winning teams will advance to the semi-finals while the three losing teams will enter the All-Ireland qualifiers.

Semi-finals: (2 matches) The three winners of the quarter-finals will join Kilkenny (who, as reigning provincial champions, will receive a bye to this stage) to make up the semi-final pairings. The two winning teams will advance to the final while the two losing teams will enter the All-Ireland qualifiers.

Final: (1 match) The winners of the two semi-finals will contest this game. The winning team will advance to the All-Ireland semi-final while the losing team will advance to the All-Ireland quarter-final.

Munster Championship

Quarter-final: (1 match) This will be a single match between the first two teams drawn from the province of Munster. The losing team will enter the All-Ireland qualifiers while the winners will advance to the semi-finals.

Semi-finals: (2 matches) The winner of the lone quarter-final will join the other three Munster teams to make up the semi-final pairings. The two winning teams will advance to the final while the two losing teams will enter the All-Ireland qualifiers.

Final: (1 match) The winners of the two semi-finals will contest this game. The winning team will advance to the All-Ireland semi-final while the losing team will advance to the All-Ireland quarter-final.

All-Ireland Qualifiers

Preliminary round: (2 matches) These will be two matches between the first four teams drawn from the six teams who lose their provincial preliminary round games and provincial quarter-final games. The two winning teams will advance to phase 1 of the All-Ireland qualifiers while the two losing teams will be eliminated from the championship.

Phase 1: (2 matches) The two winners of the preliminary qualifiers will join the two remaining provincial first round and provincial quarter-final losers to make up the phase 1 pairings. The two winning teams will advance to phase 3 while the two losing teams will be eliminated from the championship.

Phase 2: (2 matches) These will be two matches between the four teams who lose their provincial semi-final games. The two winning teams will advance to phase 3 of the All-Ireland qualifiers while the two losing teams will be eliminated from the championship.

Phase 3: (2 matches) These will be two matches between the two phase 1 winners and the two phase 2 winners. The two winning teams will advance to the All-Ireland quarter-finals while the two losing teams will be eliminated from the championship.

All-Ireland Championship

Quarter-finals: (2 matches) These will bet two lone matches between the defeated provincial finalists and the two winning teams from phase 3 of the qualifiers. The two winning teams will advance to the All-Ireland semi-finals while the two losing teams will be eliminated from the championship.

Semi-finals: (2 matches) The two quarter-final winning teams will join the two provincial winning teams to make up the semi-final pairings. The two winning teams will advance to the All-Ireland final while the two losing teams will be eliminated from the championship.

Final: (1 match) The winners of the two semi-finals will contest this game. The winning team will be declared All-Ireland champions.

== Leinster Senior Hurling Championship ==
Preliminary round
Westmeath | 0–14
Antrim | 0–12
Laois | 0–20
Carlow | 0–13

Quarter-finals
Offaly | 2–12
Wexford | 1–13
Galway | 5–19
Westmeath | 4–12
Dublin | 3–23
Laois | 1–7

Semi-finals
Offaly | 3–15
Galway | 5–23
Kilkenny | 2–21
Dublin | 0–9

Leinster final
Galway | 2–21
Kilkenny | 2–11

19 May
Preliminary round

| Westmeath | 0–14 – 0–12 | Antrim |
|---|---|---|
| N O'Brien 0–8 (6f), B Murtagh (1f), F Boyle 0–2 each, A Clarke, J Shaw 0–1 each. | Report | L Watson 0–4, S McNaughton (1f), N McManus (2f) 0–3 each, B McAuley, C McCann 0–1 each. |

Cusack Park, Mullingar
Referee: A Stapleton (Laois)

19 May
Preliminary round

| Carlow | 0–13 – 0–20 | Laois |
|---|---|---|
| M Kavanagh 0–7 (fs), A Gaule, S Kavanagh (f, '65') 0–2 each, J Kavanagh, D Roberts 0–1 each. | Report | W Hyland 0–13 (6f), S Maher 0–3, E Reilly 0–2 (f), B Dunne, J Walsh 0–1 each. |

Dr. Cullen Park, Carlow
Referee: A Kelly (Galway)

2 June
Quarter-Final

| Dublin | 3–23 – 1–7 | Laois |
|---|---|---|
| P Ryan 0–9 (2 '65, 3f), L Rushe 2–2, D Treacy 1–2, C Keaney, C McCormack, S Durkin 0–2 each, J McCaffrey, D O'Callaghan, D Sutcliffe, J Boland 0–1 each. | Report | N Foyle 1–0, W Hyland 0–3 (2f, 1 s-l), M Whelan 0–2 (1 '65) C Murray, W Dunphy 0–1 each. |

O'Connor Park, Tullamore
Attendance: 7,315
Referee: J Owens (Wexford)

2 June
Quarter-final

| Offaly | 2–12 – 1–13 | Wexford |
|---|---|---|
| S Dooley 1–8 (0–7 fs); B Carroll 0–2, J Bergin 1–1, B Murphy 0–1. | Report | J Guiney 1–3 (1–3 fs); P Morris, R Jacob 0–3; D Lyng 0–2 (0–1 lineball); PJ Nolan, G Sinnott 0–1. |

O'Connor Park, Tullamore
Attendance: 7,315
Referee: J Sexton (Cork)

3 June
Quarter-final

| Westmeath | 4–12 – 5–19 | Galway |
|---|---|---|
| N O’Brien 2–7 (7fs), B Murtagh 1–1 (1-0f). P Dowdall 1–0, P Greville, J Shaw, E Price, D Fennell, 0–1 each. | Report | N Burke 0–8 (6fs, 2 65s), D Burke 2–1, J Regan 1–2, A Smith, C Donnellan 1–1 each, C Cooney, D Hayes, I Tannian 0–2 each. |

Cusack Park, Mullingar
Attendance: 2,515
Referee: J Ryan (Tipperary)

17 June
Semi-Final

| Offaly | 3–15 – 5–23 | Galway |
|---|---|---|
| S Dooley 2–7(1-3fs, 0–2 65s); D Molloy 1–1; C Mahon, J Bergin C Egan 0–2 each; D Morkan 0–1 | Report | J Canning 0–11(5fs, 4 65s); C Cooney 2–0; D Hayes 1–3; D Burke 1–1; C Donnellan 0–3; D Glennon 1–0; I Tannian 0–2; N Burke, J Regan, T Haran 0–1 each |

O'Moore Park, Portlaoise
Attendance: 16,178
Referee: C McAllister (Cork)

23 June
Semi-Final

| Kilkenny | 2–21 – 0–9 | Dublin |
|---|---|---|
| H Shefflin 0–10 (9fs, 1 65), R Power 1–3, TJ Reid 1–2, P Hogan, R Hogan, E Larkin 0–2 each. | Report | P Ryan 0–4 (3fs), D Sutcliffe, R O’Dwyer, D Treacy, D O’Callaghan, A McCrabbe (f), 0–1 each. |

O'Moore Park, Portlaoise
Attendance: 12,446
Referee: B Kelly (Westmeath)

8 July
Final

| Galway | 2–21 – 2–11 | Kilkenny |
|---|---|---|
| J Canning 1–10 (7fs), C Donnellan 0–5, D Burke 1–2, N Burke 0-2, D Collins, D Hayes 0–1 each | Report | H Shefflin 1–8 (7fs), R Hogan 1–0, R Power 0–2, M Rice 0–1 |

Croke Park, Dublin
Attendance: 22,171
Referee: J McGrath Westmeath

== Munster Senior Hurling Championship ==
Quarter-final
Limerick | 1–19
Tipperary | 2–20

Semi-finals
Clare | 1–18
Waterford | 2–17
Cork | 0–24
Tipperary | 1–22

Munster final
Waterford | 0–16
Tipperary | 2–17

27 May
Quarter-final

| Tipperary | 2–20 – 1–19 | Limerick |
|---|---|---|
| P Bourke 1–8 (0-5f, 0–1 65), B O’Meara 1–2, N McGrath 0–3, E Kelly 0-1f, T Stapleton 0–1, J O’Brien 0–1, S Bourke 0–1, S Callanan 0–1, S McGrath 0–1, C O’Brien 0–1. | Report | S Dowling 0–8 (4f), G Mulcahy 1–2, S Tobin 0–3, K Downes 0–2, C Allis 0–2, D Breen 0–1, D Hannon 0–1. |

Semple Stadium, Thurles
Attendance: 22,068
Referee: B Kelly (Westmeath)

17 June
Semi-final

| Clare | 1–18 – 2–17 | Waterford |
|---|---|---|
| J Conlon 1–2, N O’Connell 0–5 (4f), C McGrath 0–4, C Ryan 0-3f, J Clancy 0–3, P Kelly 0-1f. | Report | M Shanahan 0–7 (5f), S Walsh 1–2, E Kelly 1–0 pen, J Mullane 0–3, P Mahony, S Molumphy, S Prendergast, G O’Brien & M O’Neill 0–1 each. |

Semple Stadium, Thurles
Attendance: 12,296
Referee: J McGrath (Westmeath)

24 June
Semi-final

| Cork | 0–24 – 1–22 | Tipperary |
|---|---|---|
| P Horgan 0–11 (8f); P O’Sullivan 0–3; J Coughlan 0–3; C Lehane 0–2; P Cronin, C Naughton, D Kearney, C McCarthy, D Sweetnam, 0–1 each. | Report | P Bourke 0–12 (7f, 2 65s); N McGrath 1–4; B O’Meara 0–2; B Maher 0–2; Padraic Maher, G Ryan, 0–1 each. |

Páirc Uí Chaoimh, Cork
Attendance: 32,568
Referee: B Gavin (Offaly)

15 July
Final

| Waterford | 0–16 – 2–17 | Tipperary |
|---|---|---|
| M Shanahan 0-08 (0-05f, 0-01 '65'), J Mullane 0-03, S Walsh 0-02, P Mahony, S Molumphy, E Kelly (0-01f) 0-01 each. | Report | J O’Brien 1-03, S Bourke 1-01, N McGrath, E Kelly (0-02f) 0-03 each, B O’Meara, P Bourke (0-02f) 0-02 each, Padraic Maher, S McGrath, M Cahill 0-01 each. |

Páirc Uí Chaoimh, Cork
Attendance: 26,438
Referee: C McAllister (Cork)

== All-Ireland Qualifiers ==
=== Preliminary round ===
23 June 2012
Preliminary round

| Wexford | 3–22 – 2–9 | Westmeath |
|---|---|---|
| D Lyng 0–15 (10fs), D O’Keefe 1–2, G Sinnott 1–1, R Jacob 1–0, D Redmond 0–2, PJ Nolan, H Kehoe 0–1 each. | Report | N O’Brien 0–5 (4fs), B Murtagh 1-1fs, C Boyle 1–0, F Boyle, J Shaw, R Greville 0–1 each. |

Wexford Park, Wexford
Referee: C Lyons (Limerick)

23 June 2012
Preliminary round

| Limerick | 6–21 – 1–11 | Laois |
|---|---|---|
| S Dowling 1–8 (0-5f, 0–1 '65'), N Moran 3–1, D Breen, T Quaid 1–1 each, G Mulcahy, D Hannon 0–3 each, S Tobin, J Ryan, P O'Brien, T O'Brien 0–1 each | Report | W Hyland 1–10 (0-7f, 0–1 '65'); S Maher 0–1 |

Gaelic Grounds, Limerick
Referee: M Wadding (Waterford)

=== Phase 1 ===
30 June 2012
Phase 1

| Limerick | 8–26 – 1–15 | Antrim |
|---|---|---|
| S Dowling 3–9 (0-5f, 0–1 '65') G Mulcahy 2–4, N Moran 2–0, S Tobin 1–3, D Hannon 0–6, S O'Brien 0–2, T O'Brien, R McCarthy 0–1 each. | Report | L Watson 0–7 (0-5f 0-1pen), N McManus 1–1, S McNaughton 0–3, B McAuley 0–2, N McAuley, E McCloskey 0–1 each. |

Gaelic Grounds, Limerick
Referee: J Ryan (Tipperary)

30 June 2012
Phase 1

| Wexford | 4–12 – 0–14 | Carlow |
|---|---|---|
| R Jacob 2–3, D Lyng 0–5 (0-4f), J Guiney, G Moore 1–0, D Redmond, H Kehoe, R Kehoe, G Sinnott 0–1 each. | Report | M Kavanagh 0–8 (0-7f, 0–1 '65'), A Gaule 0–2, M Brennan, R Coady (f), D English, A McDonald 0–1. |

Wexford Park, Wexford
Referee: A Stapleton (Laois)

=== Phase 2 ===
7 July 2012
Phase 2

| Clare | 1–16 – 0–16 | Dublin |
|---|---|---|
| T Kelly 1-02 (1-0f), C McGrath 0-05 (4f), J Conlon 0-04, S Collins 0-02, S Morey, J Clancy, D Honan 0-01 each. | Report | P Ryan 0-09 (7f, 2 '65), M O’Brien 0-02, A McCrabbe (f), D Treacy, S Lambert, N Corcoran, D Sutcliffe 0-01 each. |

Cusack Park, Ennis
Referee: D Kirwan (Cork)

7 July 2012
Phase 2

| Cork | 1–26 – 2–16 | Offaly |
|---|---|---|
| P Horgan 1–10 (7f), C McCarthy 0–5 (3 '65', 1f), C Lehane 0–3, A Nash (2f), S Moylan 0–2 each; P Cronin, L McLoughlin, D Kearney, C Naughton 0–1 each. | Report | S Dooley 1–6 (1-3f, 1 '65'), C Egan 1–0, J Bergin 0–3, D Morkan 0–2, S Ryan, B Murphy, B Carroll, C Mahon, D Molloy 0–1 each. |

Páirc Uí Chaoimh, Cork
Referee: M Wadding (Waterford)

=== Phase 3 ===
14 July 2012
Phase 3

| Wexford | 2–17 – 3–24 | Cork |
|---|---|---|
| D Lyng 1-03 (0-01sl, 0-01f), G Sinnott 1-02, J Guiney 0-05 (0-03f), R Jacob 0-03, H Kehoe 0-02, D Redmond, L Og McGovern 0-01 each. | Report | P Horgan 0-07 (0-05f), L O’Farrell 2-02, A Nash 1-01 (1-00 pen, 0-01f), N McCarthy 0-03, C Lehane, P O’Sullivan, P Cronin, J Coughlan (0-01f), 0-02 each, L McLoughlin, C McCarthy, C Naughton 0-01 each. |

Semple Stadium, Thurles
Attendance: 20,142
Referee: J Ryan (Tipperary)

14 July 2012
Phase 3

| Limerick | 3–18 – 1–20 | Clare |
|---|---|---|
| S Dowling 0-8f, N Moran 0–5, S Tobin 1–1, W McNamara & D Hannon 1–0 each, G Mulcahy 0–2, G O’Mahony 0-1f, K Downes 0–1. | Report | T Kelly 1–2 (1-1f), N O’Connell 0–4 (0-3f), C Galvin 0–3, A Cunningham 0–1, J Conlon 0–2, C McGrath 0–6 (0-4f), B Bugler 0–1, P Donnellan 0–1. |

Semple Stadium, Thurles
Attendance: 20,142
Referee: B Gavin (Offaly)

== All-Ireland Senior Hurling Championship ==
Quarter-finals
Kilkenny | 4–16
Limerick | 1–16
Waterford | 0–19
Cork | 1–19

Semi-finals
Tipperary | 1–15
Kilkenny | 4–24
Galway | 0–22
Cork | 0–17

All-Ireland final
Kilkenny (R) | 0–19; 3–22
Galway (R) | 2–13; 3–11

=== Quarter-finals ===
29 July 2012
Quarter-final

| Waterford | 0–19 – 1–19 | Cork |
|---|---|---|
| M Shanahan 0–9 (6f, 1 '65), Pauric Mahony 0–3, S Walsh, J Mullane 0–2 each, S Molumphy, S Prendergast, T Browne (f) 0–1 each. | Report | J Coughlan 1–1, P Horgan 0–7 (4f), C McCarthy 0–3, P Cronin, P O’Sullivan, C Naughton 0–2 each, L O’Farrell, S Og O hAilipin 0–1 each. |

Semple Stadium, Thurles
Attendance: 38,116
Referee: B Kelly (Westmeath)

29 July 2012
Quarter-final

| Kilkenny | 4–16 – 1–16 | Limerick |
|---|---|---|
| H Shefflin 2-06 (0-04f), C Fennelly, A Fogarty 1-02 each, R Power 0-02 (2f), R Hogan, E Larkin, M Fennelly, T Walsh 0-01 each. | Report | D Breen 1-03, S Dowling 0–04 (3f), D Hannon 0-03 (2f), G Mulcahy 0-02, S Tobin, N Moran, K Downes, T Quaid 0-01 each. |

Semple Stadium, Thurles
Attendance: 38,116
Referee: M Wadding (Waterford)

=== Semi-finals ===
12 August 2012
Semi-final

| Galway | 0–22 – 0–17 | Cork |
|---|---|---|
| J Canning 0–11 (0-05f, 0-02 '65'), D Hayes 0-04, J Regan, D Burke, N Burke 0-02 each, A Smith 0-01. | Report | P Horgan 0-07 (0-06f), P O’Sullivan 0-03, J Coughlan, C McCarthy, L O’Farrell, D Sweetnam, P Cronin, C Naughton, A Nash (0-01f) 0-01 each. |

Croke Park, Dublin
Attendance: 41,537
Referee: B Gavin (Offaly)

19 August 2012
Semi-final

| Tipperary | 1–15 – 4–24 | Kilkenny |
|---|---|---|
| P Bourke 1–8 (4f, 4 65s); N McGrath 0–2; J O’Neill 0–2; C O’Mahony, S McGrath, J O’Brien, 0–1 each. | Report | H Shefflin 0–11 (9f, 1 65); TJ Reid 2–2; A Fogarty 1–3; E Larkin 1–0; R Power 0–3 (1f, 1 65); B Hogan, M Fennelly, M Rice, C Fennelly, C Buckley, 0–1 each. |

Croke Park, Dublin
Attendance: 50,220
Referee: C McAllister (Cork)

=== Final ===
9 September 2012
3:30 pm
Final

| Galway | 2–13 – 0–19 | Kilkenny |
|---|---|---|
| J Canning 1–09 (0-08f), N Burke 1-02, A Smith, N Donoghue 0-01 each. | Report | H Shefflin 0–12 (10f, 1 pen), E Larkin, TJ Reid 0-02 each, A Gogarty, R Power, R Hogan. |

Croke Park, Dublin
Attendance: 81,932
Referee: B Kelly (Westmeath)

30 September 2012
3:30 pm
Final replay

| Galway | 3–11 – 3–22 | Kilkenny |
|---|---|---|
| J Canning 0–09 (5f, 1 '65, 1 sideline), D Burke 2-00, J Glynn 1-00, A Smith, T Og Regan 0-01 each. | Report | H Shefflin 0-09 (5f, 2 '65), W Walsh 1-03, R Power 1-02, C Fennelly 1-00, R Hogan 0-03, E Larkin, TJ Reid, C Buckley, M Fennelly, K Joyce (f) 0-01 each. |

Croke Park, Dublin
Attendance: 82,274
Referee: J McGrath (Westmeath)

== Statistics ==
=== Scoring ===
- First goal of the championship: Pa Bourke for Tipperary against Limerick (Munster quarter-final, 27 May 2012)

==== Top scorers ====
Overall

| Rank | Player | County | Tally | Total | Matches | Average |
|---|---|---|---|---|---|---|
| 1 | Henry Shefflin | Kilkenny | 3–56 | 65 | 6 | 10.83 |
| 2 | Joe Canning | Galway | 2–50 | 56 | 5 | 11.20 |
| 3 | Shane Dowling | Limerick | 4–37 | 49 | 5 | 9.80 |
| 4 | Patrick Horgan | Cork | 1–42 | 45 | 5 | 9.00 |
| 5 | Pa Bourke | Tipperary | 2–30 | 36 | 4 | 9.00 |
| 6 | Shane Dooley | Offaly | 4–21 | 33 | 3 | 11.00 |
| 7 | Willie Hyland | Laois | 1–26 | 29 | 3 | 9.66 |
| 8 | Diarmuid Lyng | Wexford | 1–25 | 28 | 4 | 7.00 |
| 9 | Niall O'Brien | Westmeath | 2–20 | 26 | 3 | 8.66 |
| 10 | Maurice Shanahan | Waterford | 0–24 | 24 | 3 | 8.00 |

Single game

| Rank | Player | County | Tally | Total | Opposition |
|---|---|---|---|---|---|
| 1 | Shane Dowling | Limerick | 3–9 | 18 | Antrim |
| 2 | Diarmuid Lyng | Wexford | 0–15 | 15 | Westmeath |
| 3 | Shane Dooley | Offaly | 2–7 | 13 | Galway |
| 3 | Niall O'Brien | Westmeath | 2–7 | 13 | Galway |
| 3 | Willie Hyland | Laois | 0–13 | 13 | Carlow |
| 3 | Willie Hyland | Laois | 1–10 | 13 | Limerick |
| 3 | Patrick Horgan | Cork | 1–10 | 13 | Offaly |
| 3 | Joe Canning | Galway | 1–10 | 13 | Kilkenny |
| 11 | Henry Shefflin | Kilkenny | 2–6 | 12 | Limerick |
| 11 | Joe Canning | Galway | 1–9 | 12 | Kilkenny |
| 11 | Henry Shefflin | Kilkenny | 0–12 | 12 | Galway |
| 11 | Pa Bourke | Tipperary | 0–12 | 12 | Cork |
| 13 | Shane Dowling | Limerick | 1–8 | 11 | Laois |
| 13 | Pa Bourke | Tipperary | 1–8 | 11 | Kilkenny |
| 13 | Henry Shefflin | Kilkenny | 1–8 | 11 | Galway |
| 13 | Pa Bourke | Tipperary | 1–8 | 11 | Limerick |
| 13 | Shane Dooley | Offaly | 1–8 | 11 | Wexford |
| 13 | Henry Shefflin | Kilkenny | 0–11 | 11 | Tipperary |
| 13 | Joe Canning | Galway | 0–11 | 11 | Offaly |
| 13 | Patrick Horgan | Cork | 0–11 | 11 | Tipperary |
| 13 | Joe Canning | Galway | 0–11 | 11 | Cork |
| 22 | Niall Moran | Limerick | 3–1 | 10 | Laois |
| 22 | Graeme Mulcahy | Limerick | 2–4 | 10 | Antrim |
| 22 | Henry Shefflin | Kilkenny | 0–10 | 10 | Dublin |
| 25 | Rory Jacob | Wexford | 2–3 | 9 | Carlow |
| 25 | Shane Dooley | Offaly | 1–6 | 9 | Cork |
| 25 | Maurice Shanahan | Waterford | 0–9 | 9 | Cork |
| 25 | Joe Canning | Galway | 0–9 | 9 | Kilkenny |
| 25 | Henry Shefflin | Kilkenny | 0–9 | 9 | Galway |
| 25 | Paul Ryan | Dublin | 0–9 | 9 | Clare |
| 25 | Paul Ryan | Dublin | 0–9 | 9 | Laois |
| 32 | Liam Rushe | Dublin | 2–2 | 8 | Laois |
| 32 | Niall O'Brien | Westmeath | 0–8 | 8 | Antrim |
| 32 | Shane Dowling | Limerick | 0–8 | 8 | Tipperary |
| 32 | Niall Burke | Galway | 0–8 | 8 | Westmeath |
| 32 | Marty Kavanagh | Carlow | 0–8 | 8 | Wexford |
| 32 | Shane Dowling | Limerick | 0–8 | 8 | Clare |
| 32 | Maurice Shanahan | Waterford | 0–8 | 8 | Tipperary |

=== Miscellaneous ===
- Westmeath's defeat of Antrim in the Leinster preliminary round is their first ever victory over the team in the championship. It is only the second ever meeting of the sides in the championship.
- In the Leinster quarter-final, Offaly defeat Wexford for the first time since 2000.
- For the first time in championship history Waterford qualify for a fourth consecutive Munster final.
- In the Leinster semi-final between Kilkenny and Dublin, Henry Shefflin becomes the first player in championship history to surpass 500 points.
- Limerick's score of 6–21 against Laois in the All-Ireland qualifiers is their highest ever tally in a championship match. One week later they break this record by scoring 8–26 against Antrim.
- The Munster semi-final meeting of Cork and Tipperary sets a new record as the ninth consecutive year that the sides have met in championship hurling. Previous consecutive meetings stretched from 1949 (draw and replay) to 1954 – a total of seven games in six years. Earlier, eight games were played in the seven-year period 1907 to 1913, however, two of those games were played in the calendar year of 1908.
- In the Leinster final Henry Shefflin becomes Kilkenny's most "capped" player of all-time when he makes his 58th championship appearance. His goal in that game preserves his unique record of being the only player in history to score a goal in fourteen consecutive championship seasons.
- Galway make history by winning the Leinster Championship for the first time.
- Cork and Galway meet in an All-Ireland semi-final for the first time since 1985.
- Tipperary's eighteen point defeat by Kilkenny in the All-Ireland semi-final is their biggest defeat in the championship since a 4–16 to 0–2 defeat by Cork in 1897.
- The All-Ireland final sees Kilkenny face Galway in the championship decider for the first time since 1993. It is a record seventh All-Ireland final in succession for Kilkenny while Galway qualify for the All-Ireland final for the first time since 2005.
- The All-Ireland final goes to a replay for the first time since 1959.
- As a result of Kilkenny's defeat of Galway in the championship decider, Henry Shefflin becomes the only player in championship history to win nine All-Ireland medals on the field of play.

=== Player facts ===
Debutantes

The following players made their début in the 2012 championship:

| Player | Team | Date | Opposition | Game |
|---|---|---|---|---|
| John Kerr | Antrim | 19 May | Westmeath | Leinster preliminary round |
| Frank Boyle | Westmeath | 19 May | Antrim | Leinster preliminary round |
| Aonghus Clarke | Westmeath | 19 May | Antrim | Leinster preliminary round |
| David Fennell | Westmeath | 19 May | Antrim | Leinster preliminary round |
| Paul Fennell | Westmeath | 19 May | Antrim | Leinster preliminary round |
| Robbie Greville | Westmeath | 19 May | Antrim | Leinster preliminary round |
| Shane McGovern | Westmeath | 19 May | Antrim | Leinster preliminary round |
| Niall O'Brien | Westmeath | 19 May | Antrim | Leinster preliminary round |
| Gearóid Burke | Laois | 19 May | Carlow | Leinster preliminary round |
| Stephen Maher | Laois | 19 May | Carlow | Leinster preliminary round |
| Chris Murray | Laois | 19 May | Carlow | Leinster preliminary round |
| David O'Mahoney | Laois | 19 May | Carlow | Leinster preliminary round |
| Brendan Reddin | Laois | 19 May | Carlow | Leinster preliminary round |
| Martin Clowry | Carlow | 19 May | Laois | Leinster preliminary round |
| Johnny Corcoran | Carlow | 19 May | Laois | Leinster preliminary round |
| James Kane | Carlow | 19 May | Laois | Leinster preliminary round |
| Marty Kavanagh | Carlow | 19 May | Laois | Leinster preliminary round |
| Killian McCabe | Carlow | 19 May | Laois | Leinster preliminary round |
| Daryl Roberts | Carlow | 19 May | Laois | Leinster preliminary round |
| Ross Smithers | Carlow | 19 May | Laois | Leinster preliminary round |
| Conor Allis | Limerick | 27 May | Tipperary | Munster quarter-final |
| Shane Dowling | Limerick | 27 May | Tipperary | Munster quarter-final |
| Donagh Maher | Tipperary | 27 May | Limerick | Munster quarter-final |
| Shane Stapleton | Dublin | 2 June | Laois | Leinster quarter-final |
| Willie Devereux | Wexford | 2 June | Offaly | Leinster quarter-final |
| Jack Guiney | Wexford | 2 June | Offaly | Leinster quarter-final |
| Eoin Moore | Wexford | 2 June | Offaly | Leinster quarter-final |
| Shaun Murphy | Wexford | 2 June | Offaly | Leinster quarter-final |
| Stephen Murphy | Wexford | 2 June | Offaly | Leinster quarter-final |
| Pádraig Brehony | Galway | 3 June | Westmeath | Leinster quarter-final |
| Niall Burke | Galway | 3 June | Westmeath | Leinster quarter-final |
| Conor Cooney | Galway | 3 June | Westmeath | Leinster quarter-final |
| Richie Cummins | Galway | 3 June | Westmeath | Leinster quarter-final |
| Niall Donoghue | Galway | 3 June | Westmeath | Leinster quarter-final |
| Brian Flaherty | Galway | 3 June | Westmeath | Leinster quarter-final |
| Fearghal Flannery | Galway | 3 June | Westmeath | Leinster quarter-final |
| Davy Glennon | Galway | 3 June | Westmeath | Leinster quarter-final |
| Jonathan Glynn | Galway | 3 June | Westmeath | Leinster quarter-final |
| Paul Gordon | Galway | 3 June | Westmeath | Leinster quarter-final |
| Thomas Gallagher | Westmeath | 3 June | Galway | Leinster quarter-final |
| Enda Barrett | Clare | 17 June | Waterford | Munster semi-final |
| Pádraig Collins | Clare | 17 June | Waterford | Munster semi-final |
| Aaron Cunningham | Clare | 17 June | Waterford | Munster semi-final |
| Pa Kelly | Clare | 17 June | Waterford | Munster semi-final |
| Séadna Morey | Clare | 17 June | Waterford | Munster semi-final |
| Stephen Daniels | Waterford | 17 June | Clare | Munster semi-final |
| Gavin O'Brien | Waterford | 17 June | Clare | Munster semi-final |
| Stephen O'Keeffe | Waterford | 17 June | Clare | Munster semi-final |
| Martin O'Neill | Waterford | 17 June | Clare | Munster semi-final |
| Dean Twomey | Waterford | 17 June | Clare | Munster semi-final |
| Tadhg Haran | Galway | 17 June | Offaly | Leinster semi-final |
| Joseph Cooney | Galway | 17 June | Offaly | Leinster semi-final |
| Cormac Boyle | Westmeath | 23 June | Wexford | Qualifiers preliminary round |
| Diarmuid O'Keeffe | Wexford | 23 June | Westmeath | Qualifiers preliminary round |
| Andrew Collier | Laois | 23 June | Limerick | Qualifiers preliminary round |
| Nathan Unwin | Laois | 23 June | Limerick | Qualifiers preliminary round |
| Tommy Quaid | Limerick | 23 June | Laois | Qualifiers preliminary round |
| Cillian Buckley | Kilkenny | 23 June | Dublin | Leinster semi-final |
| Richie Doyle | Kilkenny | 23 June | Dublin | Leinster semi-final |
| Kieran Joyce | Kilkenny | 23 June | Dublin | Leinster semi-final |
| Daniel Kearney | Cork | 24 June | Tipperary | Munster semi-final |
| Darren Sweetnam | Cork | 24 June | Tipperary | Munster semi-final |
| David English | Carlow | 30 June | Wexford | Qualifiers phase 1 |
| John Michael Nolan | Carlow | 30 June | Wexford | All-Ireland qualifiers phase 1 |
| Brian Treacy | Carlow | 30 June | Wexford | Qualifiers phase 1 |
| Liam Óg McGovern | Wexford | 30 June | Carlow | Qualifiers phase 1 |
| Aaron Murphy | Limerick | 30 June | Antrim | Qualifiers phase 1 |
| Seánie O'Brien | Limerick | 30 June | Antrim | Qualifiers phase 1 |
| Colm Galvin | Clare | 7 July | Dublin | Qualifiers phase 2 |
| Tony Kelly | Clare | 7 July | Dublin | Qualifiers phase 2 |
| Niall McMurrow | Dublin | 7 July | Clare | Qualifiers phase 2 |
| Christopher Joyce | Cork | 7 July | Offaly | Qualifiers phase 2 |
| Eoin Kelly | Offaly | 7 July | Cork | Qualifiers phase 2 |
| Dermot Mooney | Offaly | 7 July | Cork | Qualifiers phase 2 |
| Conor Fogarty | Kilkenny | 19 August | Tipperary | All-Ireland semi-final |
| Walter Walsh | Kilkenny | 30 September | Galway | All-Ireland final replay |

Retirees

The following players played their last game in the 2012 championship:

| Player | Team | Last Game | Date | Opposition | Début |
|---|---|---|---|---|---|
| David Franks | Offaly | All-Ireland qualifiers | 7 July | Cork | 2000 |
| John Gardiner | Cork | All-Ireland quarter-final | 29 July | Waterford | 2002 |
| Brian Geary | Limerick | All-Ireland qualifiers | 14 July | Clare | 1999 |
| Noel Hickey | Kilkenny | All-Ireland final replay | 30 September | Galway | 2000 |
| Eoin Kelly | Waterford | Munster final | 15 July | Tipperary | 2002 |
| Niall McCarthy | Cork | All-Ireland semi-final | 12 August | Galway | 2002 |
| Eoin McGrath | Waterford | All-Ireland quarter-final | 29 July | Cork | 2002 |
| John Mullane | Waterford | All-Ireland quarter-final | 29 July | Cork | 2001 |
| Brendan Murphy | Offaly | All-Ireland qualifiers | 7 July | Cork | 2000 |
| Seán Óg Ó hAilpín | Cork | All-Ireland semi-final | 12 August | Galway | 1996 |
| Darren Stamp | Wexford | All-Ireland qualifiers | 14 July | Cork | 2001 |

== Awards ==
Monthly

| Month | Opel GAA/GPA Player of the Month | |
| Month | Player | County |
|---|---|---|
| May | Willie Hyland | Laois |
| June | Patrick Maher | Tipperary |
| July | Kevin Moran | Waterford |
| August | Joe Canning | Galway |
| September | Henry Shefflin | Kilkenny |

== Managerial changes ==
The following managerial change took place during the championship.

| Team | Outgoing manager | Manner of departure | Date of vacancy | Replaced by | Date of appointment | Position |
|---|---|---|---|---|---|---|
| Antrim | Jerry Wallis | Resigned | 8 June 2012 | Jim Nelson | 12 June 2012 | Defeated in Leinster preliminary round |

== See also ==
- 2012 National Hurling League
