= 2012 Interprovincial Hurling Championship =

- Dates: 19 February – 4 March 2012
- Teams: Connacht; Leinster; Munster; Ulster
- Champions: Leinster

Tournament statistics
- Matches played: 3
- Goals scored: 11 (3.67 per match)
- Points scored: 98 (32.67 per match)
- Top scorer(s): Richie Power (1-15)

The 2012 Interprovincial Hurling Championship, known as the 2012 M Donnelly Hurling Interprovincial Championship due to the tournament's sponsorship by businessman Martin Donnelly, is the 83rd series of the Interprovincial Championship. The annual hurling championship between the four historic provinces of Ireland is contested by Connacht, Leinster, Munster and Ulster. The championship was won by Leinster.

== Participants ==
The teams involved are:

Province	Manager	Captain
Connacht	Anthony Cunningham	
Leinster	Joe Dooley	Jackie Tyrrell
Munster	Liam Sheedy	Eoin Kelly
Ulster	Gregory O'Kane	Cormac Donnelly

== Results ==
=== Interprovincial Championship ===
February 19
Semi-final
14:00 IST/GMT+0 (UTC+0)

Leinster	3-14 – 1-16	Munster
R Power (1-5); S Dooley (0-5); J Bergin (1-1); M Fennelly (1-0); B Hogan (0-1); E Larkin (0-1); C Fennelly (0-1)	Report	J Conlon (1-3); P Horgan (0-3); J Gardiner (0-3); P Mahony (0-2); M Walsh (0-1); P Cronin (0-1); S McGrath (0-1); P Donnellan (0-1); E Kelly (0-1)

Nowlan Park, Kilkenny
Referee: A Kelly (Galway)

GK	1	Gary Maguire
RCB	2	Paul Murphy
FB	3	Noel Hickey
LCB	4	Jackie Tyrrell (c)
RWB	5	Tommy Walsh
CB	6	Brian Hogan	(substituted off) 35'
LWB	7	J. J. Delaney
MD	8	Michael Fennelly	(substituted off) 64'
MD	9	Michael Rice
RWF	10	Ryan O'Dwyer	(substituted off) 54'
CF	11	Richie Power
LWF	12	Eoin Larkin
RCF	13	Shane Dooley
CF	14	Joe Bergin	(substituted off) 61'
LCF	15	Richie Hogan	(substituted off) 35'
Substitutes:
		Willie Hyland	(substituted in) 35'
		Darren Stamp	(substituted in) 35'
		Colin Fennelly	(substituted in) 54'
		Rory Hanniffy	(substituted in) 61'
		Rory Jacob	(substituted in) 66'
Manager:
		Joe Dooley
Selectors:
		John Conran
		Derek Lyng

GK	1	Donal Óg Cusack
RCB	2	Michael Cahill
FB	3	Paul Curran
LCB	4	Tom Condon
RWB	5	John Gardiner	(substituted off) 58'
CB	6	Pádraic Maher
LWB	7	Pat Donnellan
MD	8	Shane O'Sullivan
MD	9	Shane McGrath	(substituted off) 39'
RWF	10	Pa Cronin	(substituted off) 44'
CF	11	Michael Walsh
LWF	12	Brendan Maher
RCF	13	John Conlon
CF	14	Eoin Kelly (c)	(substituted off) 58'
LCF	15	Patrick Horgan	(substituted off) 35'
Substitutes:
		Donal O'Grady	(substituted in) 39'
		Stephen Molumphy	(substituted in) 44'
		Pauric Mahony	(substituted in) 58'
		Gearóid Ryan	(substituted in) 58'
		Kevin Moran	(substituted in) 67'
Manager:
		Liam Sheedy
Selectors:
		Jamesie O'Connor
		Stephen Frampton

February 19
Semi-final
14:00 IST/GMT+0 (UTC+0)

Connacht	3–19 – 1-15	Ulster
N Burke (0-8); I Tannian (1-4); E Ryan (1-3); D Glennon (1-0); J Coen (0-2); N Healy (0-2)	Report	K Stewart (0-6); N McManus (0-5); C Donnelly (1-0); M Armstrong (0-2); N McAuley (0-1); C Carville (0-1)

Duggan Park, Ballinasloe
Referee: T Carroll (Offaly)

GK	1	Jamie Ryan
RCB	2	Pádraig Shiel
FB	3	Niall Donoghue
LCB	4	Gerard O'Halloran
RWB	5	Tony Óg Regan
CB	6	Fergal Moore
LWB	7	Brian Flaherty	(substituted off) 58'
MD	8	Jason Grealish	(substituted off) 46'
MD	9	Donal Fox	(substituted off) 35'
RWF	10	Bernard Burke
CF	11	Niall Burke	(substituted off) 56'
LWF	12	Éanna Ryan
RCF	13	Damien Hayes
CF	14	Johnny Coen	(substituted off) 74'
LCF	15	Iarla Tannian
Substitutes:
		Barry Daly	(substituted in) 35'
		Davy Glennon	(substituted in) 46'
		Niall Healy	(substituted in) 56'
		Paul Gordon	(substituted in) 58'
		Keith Raymond	(substituted in) 74'
Manager:
		Anthony Cunningham
Selectors:
		Mattie Murphy
		Tom Helebert

GK	1	Graham Clarke
RCB	2	Arron Graffin
FB	3	Cormac Donnelly (c)
LCB	4	Seán Ennis	(substituted off) 78'
RWB	5	Neil McCauley
CB	6	Liam Hinphey
LWB	7	Simon McCrory
MD	8	Conor Woods
MD	9	Neil McManus
RWF	10	Michael Herron
CF	11	Kevin McGarry	(substituted off) 35'
LWF	12	Michael Armstrong
RCF	13	Paul McCloskey	(substituted off) 43'
CF	14	Karl Stewart
LCF	15	Cathal Carville
Substitutes:
		James Coyle	(substituted in) 35'
		Ryan Gaffney	(substituted in) 43'
		Michael Ennis	(substituted in) 78'
	.
	.
Manager:
		Gregory O'Kane

March 4
Final
14:00 IST/GMT+0 (UTC+0)

Leinster	2-19 – 1-15	Connacht
R Power (0-10); R O'Dwyer (2-2); S Dooley (0-3); J Bergin (0-2); E Larkin (0-2)	Report	C Cooney (0-9); D Hayes (1-1); B Burke (0-3); I Tannian (0-1); D Burke (0-1)

Nowlan Park, Kilkenny
Referee: C Lyons (Cork)

GK	1	Gary Maguire	(substituted off) 35'
RCB	2	Paul Murphy
FB	3	Keith Rossiter
LCB	4	Niall Corcoran	(substituted off) 61'
RWB	5	Tommy Walsh
CB	6	Jackie Tyrrell (c)
LWB	7	Rory Hanniffy
MD	8	Michael Rice
MD	9	Michael Fennelly
RWF	10	Richie Power
CF	11	Joe Bergin
LWF	12	Eoin Larkin
RCF	13	Shane Dooley	(substituted off) 61'
FF	14	Ryan O'Dwyer	(substituted off) 49'
LCF	15	T. J. Reid	(substituted off) 48'
Substitutes:
		David Herity	(substituted in) 35'
		Paul Ryan	(substituted in) 48'
		Brendan Murtagh	(substituted in) 49'
		Rory Jacob	(substituted in) 61'
		David Kenny	(substituted in) 61'
Manager:
		Joe Dooley
Selectors:
		John Conran
		Derek Lyng

GK	1	Jamie Ryan
RCB	2	Pádraig Shiel
FB	3	David Collins
LCB	4	Gerard O'Halloran
RWB	5	Niall Donoghue	(substituted off) 60'
CB	6	Fergal Moore
LWB	7	Joseph Cooney
MD	8	Aidan Harte
MD	9	Jason Grealish	(substituted off) 33'
RWF	10	Johnny Coen	(substituted off) 35'
CF	11	Conor Cooney
LWF	12	Iarla Tannian	(substituted off) 42'
RCF	13	Bernard Burke
FF	14	Barry Daly	(substituted off) 48'
LCF	15	David Burke
Substitutes:
		Paul Gordon	(substituted in) 33'
		Damien Hayes	(substituted in) 35'
		James Regan	(substituted in) 42'
		Davy Glennon	(substituted in) 48'
		Keith Raymond	(substituted in) 60'
Manager:
		Anthony Cunningham
Selectors:
		Mattie Murphy
		Tom Helebert

== Top scorers ==
=== Championship ===
Rank	Player	County	Tally	Total	Matches	Average
1	Richie Power	Leinster	1–15	18	2	9.00

=== Single game ===
Rank	Player	County	Tally	Total	Opposition
1	Richie Power	Leinster	0-10	10	Connacht
2	Conor Cooney	Connacht	0-9	9	Leinster
3	Ryan O'Dwyer	Leinster	2-2	8	Connacht
3	Richie Power	Leinster	1-5	8	Munster
3	Niall Burke	Connacht	0-8	8	Ulster

== Media coverage ==
None of the Interprovincial Championship semi-finals of final were broadcast live on television, however, brief highlights of all three games were shown on TG4's GAA 2012 highlights programme.
