= 2014 All-Ireland Under-21 Hurling Championship =

All-Ireland Under-21 Hurling Championship 2014
Championship Details
- Dates: 28 May - 13 September 2014
- Teams: 18

All Ireland Champions
- Winners: Clare (4th win)
- Captain: Tony Kelly
- Manager: Gerry O'Connor & Donal Moloney

All Ireland Runners-up
- Runners-up: Wexford
- Captain: Shane O'Gorman
- Manager: J. J. Doyle

Provincial Champions
- Munster: Clare
- Leinster: Wexford
- Ulster: Antrim
- Connacht: Not Played

Championship Statistics
- Matches Played: 17
- Total Goals: 58 (3.4 per game)
- Total Points: 533 (31.3 per game)
- Top Scorer: Jack Guiney (1-35)

The 2014 All-Ireland Under-21 Hurling Championship was the 51st staging of the All-Ireland hurling championship for players under the age of twenty-one since its establishment by the Gaelic Athletic Association in 1964. The championship began on 28 May 2014 and ended on 13 September 2014.

Clare were the defending champions and successfully retained their title and winning three-in-a-row after beating Wexford by 2-20 to 3-11 in the final.

== Results ==
=== Leinster Under-21 Hurling Championship ===
28 May 2014 Quarter-final	Dublin	1-17 - 1-10	Laois	Parnell Park
19:30	P Winters (0-9), C Cronin (1-3), O O'Rorke (0-3), T Devlin (0-1) C Boland (0-1).	Report	S Maher (0-4), T Dowling (1-0), PJ Scully (0-1), C Collier (0-1), B Conroy (0-1), C Dwyer (0-1), P Lalor (0-1), Campion (0-1).	Referee: J Keenan (Wicklow)

4 June 2014 Quarter-final	Westmeath	3-19 - 0-10	Carlow	Cusack Park
19:30	N O’Brien 0-8 (3f), R Greville 2-1, D Lynch 1-2, C Scally 0-3, G Greville (f), T Gallagher, M Heaney, A Clarke, J Boyle 0-1 each.	Report	M Kavanagh 0-5 (4f), S Murphy 0-3, C Wall, J Doyle 0-1 each.

4 June 2014 Quarter-final	Kilkenny	0-10 - 2-14	Wexford	Nowlan Park
19:30	R Reid 0-5 (3f, 2 65); M Mansfield 0-2; H O’Neill, C Martin, C Prendergast 0-1 each.	Report	R Clarke 1-2; P Sutton 1-0; J Guiney 0-3 (2f); C Davitt, G Moore, C McDonald 0-2 each; A Kenny, P Doyle, K Foley 0-1 each.

25 June 2014 Semi-final	Westmeath	0-13 - 2-8	Dublin	Cusack Park
19:30	N O'Brien 0-8 (6fs, 1'65), R Greville, A Clarke 0-2 each, D Fennell 0-1	Report	C Boland 1-1, P Winters 0-4 (3fs), C Cronin 1-0, C Conway 0-2, A Clabby 0-1

25 June 2014 Semi-final	Wexford	2-17 - 0-13	Offaly	Wexford Park
19:30	J Guiney 0-9 (6fs), R Clarke, C McDonald 1-2 each, A Nolan 0-2, C Devitt, K Foley 0-1 each	Report	C Mulrooney (3fs, 1 '65'), P Geraghty 0-4 each, E Nolan 0-3 (f), J O'Connor, A Kelly 0-1 each

9 July 2014 Final	Wexford	1-20 - 0-18	Dublin	Parnell Park
19:30	J Guiney 0-8 (0-4f, 0-1 ’65), C McDonald 1-3, A Nolan 0-4, R Clarke 0-2, P Foley, G Moore, P Sutton 0-1 each.	Report	P Winters 0-9 (0-7f), C Conway 0-3, O O’Rorke, G Whelan 0-2 each, S Boland, C Dooley (0-1f) 0-1 each.

=== Munster Under-21 Hurling Championship ===
4 June 2014 Quarter-final	Limerick	1-14 - 2-20	Clare	Gaelic Grounds
19:30	S Dowling 0-8 (8f); K O’Brien 1-0; M Carmody, D Morrissey, C Lynch, M Fitzgibbon, P Ryan, D O’Donovan, 0-1 each.	Report	B Duggan 0-8 (5f); T Kelly 0-4; A Cunningham 1-1; P Duggan 1-1; S Gleeson 0-2; J Shanahan 0-2; C Galvin, S Morey, 0-1 each.

16 July 2014 Semi-final	Clare	5-19 - 1-25 (A.E.T.)	Tipperary	Cusack Park
19:30	B Duggan (0-8, 0-4 frees, 0-2 ’65); A Cunningham (2-2); D Reidy, P Duggan (1-1); S O’Donnell (1-0); C Galvin (0-3); G O’Connell, J Shanahan (0-2 each)	Report	J Forde (0-12, 0-7 frees); C O’Riordan (0-3); T Gallagher (1-0); D McCormack (0-2); S Maher, B Maher, R Maher, C Hammersley, S Cahill, T Fox, S Kennedy, L McGrath (0-1 each)

16 July 2014 Semi-final	Waterford	0-16 - 3-18	Cork	Walsh Park
19:30	A Gleeson 0-7 (3f, 2 65s); J Dillon 0-3; G O’Brien 0-2; R Barry, R Donnelly, J Barron, S Bennett, 0-1 each.	Report	R O’Shea 0-8 (4f, 1 65); A Spillane 2-1; A Cadogan 1-3; C Spillane 0-3; S O’Keeffe 0-2; C Burke 0-1

30 July 2014 Final	Clare	1-28 - 1-13	Cork	Cusack Park
19:15	B Duggan (0-10, 0-5 frees, ’0-1 65); A Cunningham (0-4); G Galvin, T Kelly (0-1 ’65), D Reidy (0-3 each); S O’Donnell (1-0); S Gleeson, P Duggan (0-2 each); C O’Connel (0-1)	Report	R O’Shea (0-7, 0-4 frees, 0-1 ’65); M Collins (0-3), A Spillane (1-0); S O’Keefe, K McIntyre, M Sugrue (0-1)	Attendance: 12,995

=== Ulster Under-21 Hurling Championship ===
13 July 2014 Quarter-final	Tyrone	2-8 - 1-17	Armagh	Healy Park
12:45

16 July 2014 Semi-final	Down	3-24 - 3-7	Armagh	Páirc Esler
19:30	P Mason (0-9, 5f), B Nicholson (2-1), M Nicholson (1-2), E Sands (0-4), J McManus (0-3), J Doran (0-2), L Savage (0-1), C O'Neill (0-1), D Freer (0-1).	Report	C Gorman (1-1), D McKenna (1-0), T Nevin (1-0), N Green (0-2f), C Duffy (0-2), C McAnallen (0-1f), C Farrell (0-1).

16 July 2014 Semi-final	Antrim	3-23 - 0-10	Derry	Páirc Mac Uílín
19:30	C Clarke (1-7, 0-2f, 1'65), S McCaughan (2-1), N McKenna (0-3), D McCloskey (0-3), R McCambridge (0-2), J O'Connell (0-2), M Bradley (0-2), C McNaughton (0-2), D McGuinness (0-1).	Report	S Farren (0-5f), J O'Dwyer (0-3), T McCloskey (0-1), T O'Kane (0-1).

23 July 2014 Final	Down	1-5 - 7-17	Antrim	Athletic Grounds
19:00	C Fitzsimmon 1-1, E Sands 0-2, J McGrath, P Mason 0-1 each.	Report	C Clarke 1-6 (2f), S McCaughan 2-1, C Burke 2-0, N McKenna 1-2, Seán McAfee 1-0, D McKernan 0-2, J McGreevey, M Dudley, D McCloskey, R McCambridge, Stephen McAfee, E McCaughen 0-1 each.	Referee: A Nash (Derry)

=== All-Ireland Under-21 Hurling Championship ===
23 August 2014 Semi-final	Clare	4-28 - 1-10	Antrim	Semple Stadium
16:00	A Cunningham (3-3), T Kelly (1-3), C O’Connell (0-6, 5f), B Duggan (0-5, 3f), D Reidy (0-3), C Galvin (0-2), S O’Donnell (0-2), J Shanahan (0-1), E Enright (0-1), N Deasy (0-1), S Gleeson (0-1).	Report	Sean McAfee (1-0), C Clarke (0-3, 1f), Stephen McAfee (0-3), S McCaughan (0-1), C Burke (0-1), M Bradley (0-1), D McKernan (0-1).	Referee: B Redmond

23 August 2014 Semi-final	Wexford	1-21 - 1-19	Galway	Semple Stadium
18:00	J Guiney (1-8, 0-7f), C McDonald (0-3), K Foley (0-3), G Moore (0-3), P Foley (0-2), A Nolan (0-1), C Devitt (0-1).	Report	P Brehony (1-6), S Maloney (0-6, 3f), C Mannion (0-3), A Tuohy (0-1), E Burke (0-1), J Glynn (0-1), B Molloy (0-1).	Referee: D Kirwan

13 September 2014 Final	Clare	2-20 - 3-11	Wexford	Semple Stadium
19:00	T Kelly 0-7, A Cunningham 1-2, D Reidy 1-1, C Galvin 0-4, B Duggan 0-4 (2f), J Shanahan 0-1, G O’Connell 0-1	Report	J Guiney 0-7 (6f, 1 ’65′), D Dunne 2-0, C McDonald 1-1 G Moore 0-2, C Devitt 0-1	Attendance: 15,081; Referee: C McAllister (Cork)

== Statistics ==
- First goal of the championship: Colm Cronin for Dublin against Laois (28 May 2014)
- Widest winning margin: 30
  - Antrim 7-17 - 1-05 Down (23 July 2014)
- Most goals in a match: 8
  - Antrim 7-17 - 1-05 Down (23 July 2014)
- Most points in a match: 44
  - Clare 5-19 - 1-25 Tipperary (16 July 2014)
- Most goals by one team in a match: 7
  - Antrom 7-17 - 1-05 Down (23 July 2014)
- Highest aggregate score: 62
  - Clare 5-19 - 1-25 Tipperary (16 July 2014)
- Lowest aggregate score: 27
  - Westmeath 0-13 - 2-8 Dublin (25 June 2014)
- Most goals scored by a losing team: 3
  - Armagh 3-7 - 3-24 Down (16 July 2014)

=== Discipline ===
- First red card of the championship: Willie Young for Laois against Dublin (28 May 2014)

=== Top scorers ===
Rank	Player	County	Tally	Total	Matches	Average
1	Jack Guiney	Wexford	1-35	38	5	7.60
2	Bobby Duggan	Clare	0-35	35	5	7.00
3	Aaron Cunningham	Clare	7-12	33	5	6.60
4	Ciarán Clarke	Antrim	2-16	22	3	7.33
4	Paul Winters	Dublin	0-22	22	3	7.33
6	Conor McDonald	Wexford	3-11	20	5	4.00
6	Tony Kelly	Clare	1-17	20	4	5.00
8	Niall O'Brien	Westmeath	0-16	16	2	8.00
9	Saul McCaughan	Antrim	4-03	15	3	5.00
9	Rob O'Shea	Cork	0-15	15	2	7.50

=== Single game ===
Rank	Player	County	Tally	Total	Opposition
1	Aaron Cunningham	Clare	3-03	12	Antrim
1	Jason Forde	Tipperary	0-12	12	Clare
3	Jack Guiney	Wexford	1-08	11	Galway
4	Ciarán Clarke	Antrim	1-07	10	Derry
4	Bobby Duggan	Clare	0-10	10	Cork
6	Ciarán Clarke	Antrim	1-06	9	Down
6	Paul Winters	Dublin	0-09	9	Laois
6	Jack Guiney	Wexford	0-09	9	Offaly
6	Paul Winters	Dublin	0-09	9	Wexford
6	Peter Mason	Down	0-09	9	Armagh

== Awards ==
Team of the Year

1. Oliver O'Leary
2. Cathal Barrett
3. Liam Ryan
4. Séadna Morey
5. Andrew Kenny
6. Conor Cleary
7. Jamie Shanahan
8. Colm Galvin
9. Eoin Enright
10. Jack Guiney
11. Tony Kelly
12. Pádraig Brehony
13. Jason Forde
14. Conor McDonald
15. Aaron Cunningham
