= Enda Rowland =

Irish hurler

Personal information
- Native name: Éanna Ó Rothláin (Irish)
- Born: 1995 (age 30–31) Abbeyleix, County Laois, Ireland
- Occupation: Student

Sport
- Sport: Hurling
- Position: Goalkeeper
Club
- Years: Club
- Abbeyleix
Club titles
- Laois titles: 0
College
- Years: College
- Institute of Technology, Carlow
College titles
- Fitzgibbon titles: 0
Inter-county
- Years: County
- 2015-2025: Laois
Inter-county titles
- Leinster titles: 0
- All-Irelands: 0
- NHL: 0
- All Stars: 0

Enda Rowland (born 1995) is an Irish hurler who plays for Laois Senior Championship club Abbeyleix and is the captain of the Laois senior hurling team. He usually lines out as a goalkeeper.

== Playing career ==
=== Heywood Community School ===
Rowland first came to prominence as a hurler with Heywood Community School. He played in every grade of hurling before eventually joining the college's senior hurling team and enjoyed several Leinster Championship successes.

=== Institute of Technology, Carlow ===
During his studies at the Institute of Technology, Carlow, Rowland was selected in goal for the college's senior hurling team. On 25 February 2017, he was in goal when IT Carlow suffered a 3–24 to 1–19 defeat by Mary Immaculate College in the Fitzgibbon Cup final.

=== Abbeyleix ===
Rowland joined the Abbeyleix club at a young age and played in all grades at juvenile and underage levels. He eventually became the club's first-choice goalkeeper with the senior team.

=== Laois ===
==== Minor and under-21 ====
Rowland was just 15-years-old when he first played for Laois as a member of the minor team during the 2010 Leinster Championship. He made his first appearance for the team on 1 May 2010 when he lined out in goal in a 2–16 to 1–11 defeat by Westmeath.

Rowland was in his fourth and final year as a member of the Laois minor team when he lined out in the Leinster final on 7 July 2013. He ended the game on the losing side following a 1–18 to 0–08 defeat by Kilkenny.

Rowland was drafted onto the Laois under-21 team for the 2014 Leinster Championship. He made his first appearance in the grade on 28 May 2014 in a 1–17 to 1–10 defeat by Dublin.

After three years in the under-21 grade, Rowland played his last game on 25 May 2016. He lined out in goal for Laois in a 1–17 to 1–15 defeat by Carlow.

==== Senior ====
Rowland joined the Laois senior team in advance of the 2015 National League. He made his first appearance for the team on 14 February 2015 when he lined out in goal in a 1–24 to 0–23 defeat by Offaly. Rowland made his Leinster Championship debut on 3 May 2015 in a 5–17 to 3–22 defeat by Antrim.

On 30 June 2019, Rowland lined out in goal when Laois faced Westmeath in the Joe McDonagh Cup final. He ended the game with a cup winners' medal following the 3–26 to 1–21 victory. Rowland ended the season by receiving a GAA-GPA All-Star nomination.

On 22 January 2020, it was announced that Rowland had been appointed captain of the Laois senior hurling team for the 2020 season.

=== Ireland ===
Rowland was selected for the Ireland national hurling team for the first time in 2017. He made his first appearance for Ireland on 21 October when he lined out in goal in a 2–12 to 0–15 defeat by Scotland.

Rowland was included on the Ireland team for the Shinty/Hurling International Series once again in 2018. He lined out in a second final on 20 October but once again ended on the losing side following a 1–11 to 1–09 defeat by Scotland.

== Career statistics ==
As of match played 26 January 2020.

Team	Year	National League			McDonagh Cup		Leinster		All-Ireland		Total	
Team	Year	Division	Apps	Score	Apps	Score	Apps	Score	Apps	Score	Apps	Score
Laois	2015	Division 1B	4	0-00	—		3	0-00	0	0-00	7	0-00
Laois	2016	Division 1B	6	0-04	—		1	0-01	1	0-02	8	0-07
Laois	2017	Division 1B	4	1-01	—		4	0-01	2	1-03	10	2-05
Laois	2018	Division 1B	6	0-07	5	1-00	—		—		11	1-07
Laois	2019	Division 1B	6	0-06	5	0-04	—		2	0-02	13	0-12
Laois	2020	Division 1B	1	1-01	—		0	0-00	0	0-00	1	1-01
Career total			27	2-19	10	1-04	8	0-02	5	1-07	50	4-32

== Honours ==
Heywood Community School

- Leinster Post-Primary Schools Senior B Hurling Championship (1): 2013
- Rest Of Leinster Post-Primary Schools Senior B Hurling Championship (2): 2012, 2013

Laois

- Joe McDonagh Cup (1): 2019

Sporting positions
Preceded by Patrick Purcell	Laois Senior Hurling Captain; 2020-present	Succeeded by Incumbent
