= Eoin Kelly =

Eoin Kelly may refer to:

- Eoin Kelly (Tipperary hurler) (born 1982), Tipperary hurler
- Eoin Kelly (Waterford hurler) (born 1982), Waterford hurler
- Eoin Kelly (London hurler)
