= Jamie Shanahan (hurler) =

Irish hurler

Personal information
- Native name: Séamus Ó Seancháin (Irish)
- Nickname: J
- Born: 1994 (age 31–32) Sixmilebridge, County Clare, Ireland
- Height: 6 ft 2 in (188 cm)

Sport
- Sport: Hurling
- Position: Left wing-back
Club
- Years: Club
- Sixmilebridge
Club titles
- Clare titles: 4
College
- Years: College
- Limerick Institute of Technology
College titles
- Fitzgibbon titles: 0
Inter-county
- Years: County
- 2013-present: Clare
Inter-county titles
- Munster titles: 0
- All-Irelands: 1
- NHL: 1
- All Stars: 0

Jamie Shanahan (born 1994) is an Irish hurler who plays as a left wing-back for club side Sixmilebridge and at inter-county level with the Clare senior hurling team.

== Honours ==
Sixmilebridge

- Clare Senior Hurling Championship (3): 2013, 2015, 2017

Clare

- All-Ireland Senior Hurling Championship (1): 2013
- National Hurling League (1): 2016
- All-Ireland Under-21 Hurling Championship (1): 2014
- Munster Under-21 Hurling Championship (1): 2014
- Munster Minor Hurling Championship (2): 2010, 2011
