= Gerard O'Halloran =

Galway hurler

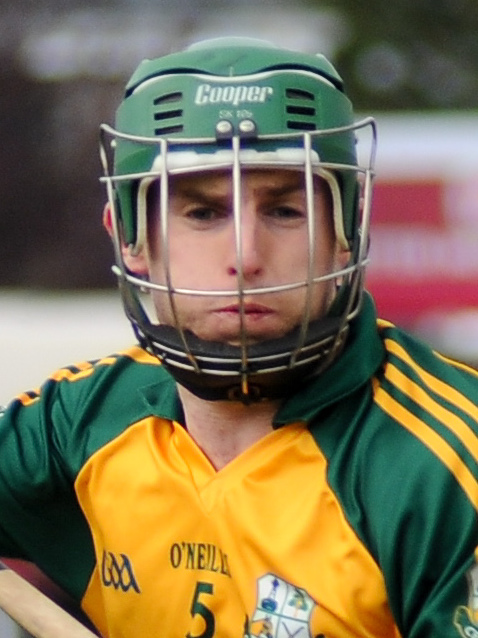

Personal information
- Native name: Gearóid Ó hAllúráin (Irish)
- Born: Galway, Ireland
- Height: 6 ft 6 in (198 cm)

Sport
- Sport: Hurling
- Position: Left Corner Back
Club
- Years: Club
- Craughwell
Club titles
- Galway titles: 0
- Leinster titles: 1
Inter-county*
Years	County	Apps (scores)
2012–	Galway	0
Inter-county titles
- Leinster titles: 0
- All-Irelands: 0
- NHL: 0
- All Stars: 10
- *Inter County team apps and scores correct as of 19:50, 12 September 2012.

Gerard O'Halloran (born 22 June 1990) is an Irish hurler who played at senior level as a substitute corner-back for the Galway county team.

O'Halloran joined the team during the 2012 championship. An All-Ireland medalist in the under-21 grade, O'Halloran has won one Leinster medal in the senior grade as a non-playing substitute.

At club level O'Halloran plays with the Craughwell club.
