= Shane McGovern =

Irish hurler

Personal information
- Native name: Seán Mag Shamhráin (Irish)
- Born: 1992 (age 33–34) Crookedwood, County Westmeath, Ireland

Sport
- Sport: Hurling
- Position: Goalkeeper
Club
- Years: Club
- Crookedwood
Club titles
- Westmeath titles: 0
Inter-county*
Years	County	Apps (scores)
2012-present	Westmeath	5 (0-00)
Inter-county titles
- Leinster titles: 0
- All-Irelands: 0
- NHL: 0
- All Stars: 0
- *Inter County team apps and scores correct as of 23:01, 10 May 2015.

Shane McGovern (born 1992) is an Irish hurler who played as a goalkeeper with the Westmeath senior team.

Born in Crookedwood, County Westmeath, McGovern first played competitive hurling during his schooling at Coláiste Mhuire in Mullingar. He arrived on the inter-county scene at the age of nineteen when he first linked up with the Westmeath under-21 team. McGovern made his senior debut during the 2012 championship.

At club level McGovern plays with Crookedwood.
