= Jerry Wallace (hurler) =

Irish hurler and manager

Sport
- Sport: hurling
- Position: coach, trainer, and manager
- Team: Cork senior hurling team Antrim senior hurling team Limerick county hurling team Midleton GAA; Glynn–Barntown GAA

Jerry Wallace is an Irish hurling coach, manager and former player. He managed the Antrim senior hurling team in 2011.

== Career ==
A native of Midleton, County Cork, Wallace was the physical trainer with the Cork senior hurling team that won back-to-back All-Ireland SHC titles in 2004 and 2005. He later served as trainer with both the Antrim and Limerick senior hurling teams.

Wallace led Kerry GAA club Ballyduff to back-to-back County Championships in 2010 and 2011, and also led the club to the Munster Intermediate Club Hurling Championship final.

He was ratified as manager of the Antrim senior hurling team on 10 October 2011.

Wallace was ratified as Director of Limerick Underage Academy of Hurling from 2012 to 2015 and also as a Hurling Coach and Selector to the Limerick minor hurling team. He coached them to back-to-back Munster MHC titles in 2013 and 2014, with Limerick losing the 2013 MHC semi-final to Galway (a game involving a Hawk-Eye controversy), then the 2014 All-Ireland MHC final to Kilkenny.

Cork GAA club Midleton appointed Wallace to manage and coach its senior hurling team between 2015 and 2017. He completed that appointment with Midleton contesting the 2015 and 2016 County Hurling semi-finals against Glen Rovers and Erin's Own. He guided them to win the REDfm Senior Hurling League title in 2015.

Wexford GAA club Glynn–Barntown appointed Wallace as manager of its senior hurling team for 2017.

In November 2017, Wallace returned to his former post as Director of Limerick's Underage Hurling Academy.

As manager of the Cork minor camogie team he secured a first All-Ireland Minor A Camogie Trophy in 2018, with a 0–18 to 1–11 victory over Galway. He repeated the feat in 2019, completing back-to-back minor titles, as Cork defeated Clare.

Waterford's camogie team appointed Wallace as manager in December 2023. They separated after the 2025 National League, with Wallace leading his team to a win against Tipperary in his last game.

Sporting positions
Preceded by Dinny Cahill	Antrim Senior hurling Manager; 2011	Succeeded by Kevin Ryan
