= Stephen Murphy (dual player) =

Irish hurler and Gaelic footballer

Personal information
- Native name: Stiofán Ó Murchú (Irish)
- Born: 1986 (age 39–40)
- Occupation: Teacher

Sport
- Football Position: Right wing-forward
- Hurling Position: Left corner-back
Clubs
- Years: Club
- Kilruane MacDonagh's; St Martin's
Inter-county
- Years: County
- 2005-2009 2012-: Tipperary (F); Wexford (H)
Inter-county titles
	Football	Hurling
Leinster Titles	0	0
All-Ireland Titles	0	0
League titles	0	0
All-Stars	0	0

Stephen Murphy (born 1986) is an Irish hurler who plays as a right corner-back for the Wexford senior team.

Murphy began his inter-county career as a Gaelic footballer with the Tipperary senior team during the 2005 championship. He spent four seasons with the team, winning a Tommy Murphy Cup medal during that time. Murphy later switched codes and made his first appearance for the Wexford hurling team during the 2012 championship.

At club level Murphy is a one-time Tipperary senior football championship medallist with group team Thomas MacDonagh's.

== Honours ==
=== Player ===
Tipperary

- Tommy Murphy Cup (1): 2005
