= Paul Gordon (hurler) =

Irish hurler

Personal information
- Native name: Pól Mac Mhuirneacháin (Irish)
- Born: 1 March 1990 (age 36) Ballinasloe, Ireland

Sport
- Sport: Hurling
- Position: Centre Back
Club
- Years: Club
- Tynagh-Abbey/Duniry
College
- Years: College
- NUI Galway
College titles
- Fitzgibbon titles: 1
Inter-county*
Years	County	Apps (scores)
2012-	Galway	22 (0-00)
Inter-county titles
- Leinster titles: 0
- All-Irelands: 0
- NHL: 0
- All Stars: 0
- *Inter County team apps and scores correct as of 22:44, 9 September 2012.

Paul Gordon (born 1 March 1990) is an Irish hurler who currently plays as a centre-back for the Galway senior team.

Gordon made his first appearance for the senior team during the 2012 championship and immediately became a regular member of the panel. An All-Ireland medalist in the under-21 grade, Gordon has won two Leinster medal in the senior grade as a playing substitute.

At club level Gordon plays with the Tynagh-Abbey-Duniry Club.
