= Jack Guiney =

Irish hurler

Personal information
- Native name: Jack Ó Guiní (Irish)
- Born: 25 April 1993 (age 33) Wexford, Ireland
- Occupation: Full Time Student
- Height: 1.9 m (6 ft 3 in)

Sport
- Sport: Hurling
- Position: Full Forward
Club
- Years: Club
- 2010-: Rathnure
Inter-county*
Years	County	Apps (scores)
2012-2015 2016-2018	Wexford	14 (4-62)
- *Inter County team apps and scores correct as of 15:01, 20 July 2014.

Jack Guiney (born 25 April 1993) is an Irish hurler who plays as a right wing-forward and as a full-forward for the Wexford senior team.

Born in Rathnure, County Wexford, Guiney first played competitive hurling during his schooling at Good Counsel College. He arrived on the inter-county scene at the age of seventeen when he first linked up with the Wexford minor team, before later lining out with the under-21 side. He made his senior debut in the 2012 National Hurling League. Guiney has been a regular fixture on team since that initial appearance.

At club level Guiney plays with Rathnure.

Guiney is the son of Dave Guiney and the nephew of Rod Guiney who both played for Wexford. His grandfather and namesake played rugby union for Ireland.

== Honours ==
Good Counsel College

- Leinster Colleges Senior Hurling Championship (1): 2009

Wexford

- Leinster Under-21 Hurling Championship (2): 2013, 2014
