= Tom Murnane =

Irish hurler

Personal information
- Nickname: Murt
- Born: County Kerry, Ireland
- Occupation: Actuary
- Height: 5 ft 9 in (175 cm)

Sport
- Sport: Hurling
- Position: Back
Club
- Years: Club
- Kilmoyley
Club titles
- Kerry titles: 9
Inter-county
- Years: County
- 2000s-2014: Kerry
Inter-county titles
- Munster titles: 0
- All-Irelands: 0
- All Stars: 2

Tom Murane is a hurler from County Kerry, Ireland. He plays with the Kerry intercounty team, of whom he was captain of in 2008. He has won two Christy Ring Cup All Stars in 2009 and 2010. He plays his club hurling with Kilmoyley with whom he has won 9 County Championship medals and was captain of the 2008 winning team.
