= Eoin Price =

Irish hurler

Personal information
- Native name: Eoin Prís (Irish)
- Born: Clonkill, County Westmeath, Ireland

Sport
- Sport: Hurling
- Position: Right wing-back
Club
- Years: Club
- 2006-present: Clonkill
Club titles
- Westmeath titles: 4
Inter-county
- Years: County
- 2007-2020: Westmeath
Inter-county titles
- Leinster titles: 0
- All-Irelands: 0
- Ring Cups: 1
- NHL: 0
- All Stars: 0

Eoin Price (born 1988 in Clonkill, County Westmeath) is an Irish sportsperson. He plays hurling with his local club Clonkill and was a member of the Westmeath senior inter-county team from 2007 until 2020.

Sporting positions
Preceded by Andrew Mitchell	Westmeath Senior Hurling Captain; 2011	Succeeded by Paddy Dowdall
Preceded by Paddy Dowdall	Westmeath Senior Hurling Captain; 2013-2014	Succeeded by Aonghus Clarke
Preceded by Aonghus Clarke	Westmeath Senior Hurling Captain; 2020	Succeeded by Cormac Boyle
