= Eoin Reilly =

Irish hurler

Personal information
- Native name: Eoin Ó Raghallaigh (Irish)
- Born: 1990 (age 35–36) Abbeyleix, County Laois, Ireland
- Occupation: Teacher

Sport
- Sport: Hurling
- Position: Goalkeeper
Club
Years	Club	Apps (scores)
2007-present	Abbeyleix	20 (3 points)
Club titles
- Laois titles: 0
Inter-county
Years	County	Apps (scores)
2010-present	Laois	3 (0-00)
Inter-county titles
- Leinster titles: 0
- All-Irelands: 0
- NHL: 0
- All Stars: 0

Eoin Reilly (born 1990 in Abbeyleix, County Laois, Ireland) is an Irish sportsperson. He plays hurling with his local club Abbeyleix and has been goalkeeper on the Laois senior inter-county team since 2010.
