= Stephen Frampton =

Irish hurler and sports commentator

Personal information
- Native name: Stiofáin Frampton (Irish)
- Born: 1969 (age 56–57) Waterford, Ireland

Sport
- Sport: Hurling
- Position: Wing-back
Club
- Years: Club
- 1980s–2004: Ballygunner
Club titles
- Waterford titles: 8
- Munster titles: 1
Inter-county
Years	County	Apps (scores)
1990–2001	Waterford	19 (0-00)
Inter-county titles
- Munster titles: 0
- All-Irelands: 0
- NHL: 0
- All Stars: 0

Stephen Frampton (born 1969) is an Irish sportsperson. He played hurling with his local club Ballygunner and with the Waterford senior inter-county team.

== Playing career ==
=== Club ===
Frampton played for his local club Ballygunner. In a long career, Frampton won 8 Waterford Senior Hurling Championships and a Munster Senior Club Hurling Championship in 2001.

=== Inter County ===
Frampton made his debut against Cork on 3 June 1990 in the Munster Senior Hurling Championship semi-final. Waterford were heavily beaten on this occasion. Frampton's came closest to winning silverware in 1998 when Waterford drew against Clare in the Munster Hurling Final. Waterford subsequently lost in the replay. Frampton's final championship appearance came against Limerick on 10 June 2001. Frampton trained with the Waterford panel at the start of 2002 but decided to retire after being an unused substitute in a Waterford Crystal Cup match. Sadly for Frampton, Waterford later went on to win the Munster Senior Hurling Championship in June of that year.

== Personal life ==
Frampton went to school at De La Salle College and played hurling and football with the school. Frampton currently works for WLR FM as a match day commentator alongside Kieran O'Connor.

== Championship Appearances ==
#	Date	Venue	Opponent	Score	Result	Competition	Match report
1	03/06/1990	Semple Stadium, Thurles	Cork	0–0	1-08 : 4–15	Munster Semi-Final	Irish Times
2	02/06/1991	Semple Stadium, Thurles	Cork	0–0	0–13 : 2–10	Munster Semi-Final	Irish Times
3	31 May 1992	Semple Stadium, Thurles	Clare	0–0	2–13 : 3–10	Munster Quarter-Final	Irish Times
4	24 May 1992	Semple Stadium, Thurles	Clare	0–0	0–16 : 0–14	Munster Quarter-Final Replay	Irish Times
5	14 June 1992	Semple Stadium, Thurles	Limerick	0–0	1–13 : 2–13	Munster Semi-Final	Irish Times
6	23 May 1993	Walsh Park, Waterford	Kerry	0–0	3–13 : 4–13	Munster Quarter-Final	Irish Times
7	19 June 1994	Semple Stadium, Thurles	Limerick	0–0	2–12 : 2–14	Munster Semi-Final	Irish Times
8	21 May 1995	Páirc Uí Chaoimh, Cork	Tipperary	0–0	1–11 : 4–23	Munster Quarter-Final	Irish Times
9	02/06/1996	Walsh Park, Waterford	Tipperary	0–0	1–14 : 1–11	Munster Quarter-Final	Irish Times
10	25 May 1997	Semple Stadium, Thurles	Limerick	0–0	1–17 : 2–20	Munster Quarter-Final	Irish Times
11	24 May 1998	Austin Stack Park, Tralee	Kerry	0–0	0–20 : 1–09	Munster Quarter-Final	Irish Independent
12	07/06/1998	Páirc Uí Chaoimh, Cork	Tipperary	0–0	0–21 : 2–12	Munster Semi-Final	Irish Independent
13	12/07/1998	Semple Stadium, Thurles	Clare	0–0	3–10 : 1–16	Munster Final	Irish Independent
14	19 July 1998	Semple Stadium, Thurles	Clare	0–0	0–10 : 2–16	Munster Final Replay	Irish Independent
15	26 July 1998	Croke Park, Dublin	Galway	0–0	1–20 : 1–10	All-Ireland Quarter-Final	Irish Independent
16	16 August 1998	Croke Park, Dublin	Kilkenny	0–0	1–10 : 1–11	All-Ireland Semi-Final	Irish Independent
17	30 May 1999	Semple Stadium, Thurles	Limerick	0–0	1–16 : 1–15	Munster Quarter-Final	Irish Examiner
18	14 June 1999	Semple Stadium, Thurles	Cork	0–0	0–24 : 1–15	Munster Semi-Final	Irish Independent
19	28 June 2000	Páirc Uí Chaoimh, Cork	Tipperary	0–0	0–14 : 0–17	Munster Quarter-Final	Irish Independent
