= Bernard Rochford =

Irish hurler

Personal information
- Native name: Beircheart de Rochford (Irish)
- Born: 1979 (age 46–47) Killeagh, County Cork, Ireland
- Height: 5 ft 11 in (180 cm)

Sport
- Sport: Hurling
- Position: Goalkeeper
Clubs
- Years: Club
- Killeagh; Imokilly
Club titles
- Cork titles: 2
College
- Years: College
- 1998-2002: Cork Institute of Technology
College titles
- Fitzgibbon titles: 0
Inter-county*
Years	County	Apps (scores)
1999-2002 2010-2013	Cork; Kerry	0 (0-00); 10 (0-00)
Inter-county titles
- Munster titles: 2 (as sub)
- All-Irelands: 1 (as sub)
- NHL: 0
- All Stars: 1
- *Inter County team apps and scores correct as of 20:52, 11 October 2012.

Bernard Rochford (born 1979) is an Irish hurler who played as a goalkeeper for the Cork and Kerry senior teams.

Rochford made his first appearance on the inter-county scene as sub-goalie on the Cork senior team during the 1999 championship and was the second-choice Keeper for four seasons from 1999 to 2002. He won two Munster medals as a non-playing substitute in 1999 and 2000.

Rochford joined the Kerry senior hurling team in 2010 and played four seasons with them. He made 3 Christy ring final appearances, winning the competition in 2010. Rochford is the only hurler to have won an All-Ireland winners' medal (as a non-playing substitute) and a Christy Ring Cup winners' medal. In 2013 he won a Christy Ring Cup All Star award.

He won an intermediate All-Ireland with Cork in 2001 and an U21 All-Ireland with Cork in 1998. He played with Cork Minors in 1997.

At club level, Rochford has won a Junior A County title (1995) and an Intermediate County title (2001) with his home club Killeagh. He has also lined out with divisional side Imokilly in the past, winning two senior county medals in 1997 and 1998.

Rochford made his international debut in 2012, playing against Scotland in the international shinty series.
