= Paddy Dowdall =

Irish hurler (born 1982)

Personal information
- Native name: Pádraig Dúdal (Irish)
- Born: 1982 (age 43–44) Clonkill, County Westmeath, Ireland
- Occupation: NCO Plant fitter

Sport
- Sport: Hurling
- Position: Midfield
Clubs
- Years: Club
- 2001-present: Clonkill (Hurling); St. Loman's Mullingar (Football)
Club titles
- Westmeath titles: 14
Inter-county
- Years: County
- 2001-present: Westmeath
Inter-county titles
- Leinster titles: 0
- All-Irelands: 0
- NHL: 0
- All Stars: 0

Paddy Dowdall (born 1982) is an Irish hurler who currently plays as a midfielder for the Westmeath senior team.

Dowdall joined the Westmeath team straight from the minor ranks in 2001, however, he didn't become a regular until the 2003 National League. Since then he was won two Christy Ring Cup medals and one National League (Division 2) medal.

At club level Dowdall is an All-Ireland and Leinster medalist in the intermediate grade with Clonkill. He has also won four senior county club championship medals. Also plays Gaelic football for St Lomans GAA, Mullingar. Altogether, Dowdall holds 15 senior club championship medals; 9 with Clonkill and 6 with St Lomans.

Sporting positions
Preceded by Eoin Price	Westmeath Senior Hurling Captain; 2012	Succeeded by Eoin Price
