= Stephen Roche (hurler) =

Irish hurler

Personal information
- Native name: Stiofán de Róiste (Irish)
- Born: 31 December 1992 (age 33) Waterford, Ireland
- Occupation: Secondary school teacher
- Height: 5 ft 8 in (173 cm)

Sport
- Sport: Hurling
- Position: Midfield
Club
- Years: Club
- Mount Sion
Club titles
- Waterford titles: 0
College
- Years: College
- Waterford Institute of Technology
College titles
- Fitzgibbon titles: 0
Inter-county
- Years: County
- 2014-present: Waterford
Inter-county titles
- Munster titles: 0
- All-Irelands: 0
- NHL: 0
- All Stars: 0

Stephen Roche (born 31 December 1992) is an Irish hurler who plays for Waterford Championship club Mount Sion and at inter-county level with the Waterford senior hurling team. He usually lines out as a midfielder.
