= Paul Winters (hurler) =

Irish hurler

Personal information
- Native name: Pól an Gheimhridh (Irish)
- Born: 1994 (age 31–32) Castleknock, Dublin, Ireland

Sport
- Sport: Hurling
- Position: Centre-forward
Club
- Years: Club
- St. Brigid's
Club titles
- Dublin titles: 0
College
- Years: College
- Maynooth University
College titles
- Fitzgibbon titles: 0
Inter-county
- Years: County
- 2014-2019: Dublin
Inter-county titles
- Leinster titles: 0
- All-Irelands: 0
- NHL: 0
- All Stars: 0

Paul Winters (born 1994) is an Irish hurler who plays for Dublin Senior Championship club St. Brigid's. He is a former member of the Dublin senior hurling team, with whom he usually lined out as a forward.

== Career ==
A member of the St. Brigid's club in Castleknock, Winters first came to prominence on the inter-county scene during a two-year tenure with the Dublin minor team. A back-to-back All-Ireland runner-up in this grade, he later had a two-year stint with the Dublin under-21 team while also lining out with Maynooth University in the Fitzgibbon Cup. Winters joined the Dublin senior hurling team in 2014 and was a regular member of the team until 2019.

== Honours ==
Dublin

- Walsh Cup: 2016
- Leinster Minor Hurling Championship: 2011, 2012
