= Aaron Cunningham (hurler) =

Irish hurler (born 1993)

Personal information
- Native name: Aaron Mac Cuinneagáin (Irish)
- Nickname: Hammy
- Born: 4 April 1993 (age 33) Shannon, County Clare, Ireland
- Occupation: Teacher
- Height: 6 ft 2 in (188 cm)

Sport
- Sport: Hurling
- Position: Right corner-forward
Club
- Years: Club
- Wolfe Tones na Sionna
Club titles
- Clare titles: 0
Inter-county*
Years	County	Apps (scores)
2012-	Clare	22 (4-12)
Inter-county titles
- Munster titles: 0
- All-Irelands: 1
- NHL: 1
- All Stars: 0
- *Inter County team apps and scores correct as of 23:12, 6 September 2012.

Aaron Cunningham (born 4 April 1993) is an Irish hurler who plays as a right corner-forward for the Clare senior team.

Cunningham joined the team during the 2012 championship and immediately became a regular member of the starting fifteen. A Munster medalist in the minor grade and a 3 time All-Ireland medalist in the under-21 grade, he has won a National Hurling League and All Ireland senior Championship medal at senior level.

At club level Cunningham plays with Wolfe Tones na Sionna.

Cunningham attended NUI Galway.
