= Combined Universities GAA =

Irish Gaelic football and hurling team

Combined Universities GAA was a Gaelic football and hurling team that was made up of players from the major universities of Ireland. The players were taken from St Patrick's College, Maynooth, Queen's University Belfast, Trinity College Dublin, University College Cork, University College Dublin, University of Ulster at Jordanstown, and University College Galway. In the 1980s Combined Advanced Colleges GAA (Combined Colleges) joined in to make the annual contests between Combined Universities, Army (Defence Forces) and Garda a quadrangular tournament.

== History ==
The concept of a match between Combined Colleges of the National University of Ireland and the All-Ireland Champion teams in hurling and gaelic football was first mooted by University College Dublin during the 1929–30 season. UCD argued that Combined Universities representative teams already competed against national sides in other sports such as rugby and hockey and that the introduction of like matches in Gaelic games would not only increase the profile of Gaelic sports in Universities but also the prestige of Gaelic games in the community. The Central Council of the Gaelic Athletic Association was initially cool to this proposal, particularly on financial grounds. However, in March 1931 a delegation from UCD went to Croke Park to advance this proposition. On this occasion, the Central Council approved the idea of an annual series of matches. Unfortunately, the first hurling match in April 1931 between an NUI Colleges Select team (6 from UCC, 5 from UCG and 4 from UCD) and the All-Ireland Champions Tipperary at Thurles was disastrous in terms of furthering the concept of an annual series of games. Tipperary proved far too strong for the NUI Select hurlers and won the match without a point being registered against them. The football match between the All-Ireland Champions Kerry and the NUI Select did not take place. On the basis that such uncompetitive games would not be attractive to spectators, the idea was dropped.

The next attempt to embrace representative games for the NUI Colleges Select team came in 1933 with an international hurling/shinty match between an Irish Universities team and the Southern Scottish Shinty League at Govan, Glasgow on 6 May. The Irish Universities won 1–0. The game was deemed a great success as an exhibition of highly skilled use of two forms of club. However, the hope of an annual match died when the Camanachd Association, the shinty governing body, was advised of the GAA's anti-British political stance.

The 1940s saw numerous inter-county standard players involved in intervarsity championships, the Sigerson Cup and Fitzgibbon Cup competitions. The 'Combined Universities' concept was again mooted on the grounds that such a representative team would positively advertise Gaelic games within and without universities. After the 1946–47 intervarsity tournaments representative football and hurling sides were picked to play the All-Ireland champions. The hurling match did not take place. The match between All-Ireland football champions Kerry and the Combined Universities Select at Tralee in May 1947, which was won by Kerry, was described as 'a very dull and uninteresting affair', possibly because there was nothing more than the winning of the match at stake Both teams were below published strengths; almost one-third of the selected sides did not play. Again hopes of an annual match faded.

Despite these setbacks the Universities persevered with their attempts to establish representative matches for Combined Universities Select teams. In 1950 these efforts were rewarded with a Combined Universities v Rest of Ireland football match at Croke Park. The prize for this match was the Dr John Ryan Memorial Cup which was donated by Dr Joseph Stuart, a former UCD student who hailed from Ogonnelloe, County Clare and future President of the GAA (1958–61). John Ryan was a student at UCD in the 1910s who led the UCD hurlers to two Fitzgibbon Cup victories and captained Dublin to All-Ireland Hurling success in 1917. The 1950 match received extensive press coverage, was aired on radio and attended by over 20,000 spectators. Although the students lost by six points, they did the university sector proud in this high-profile game. The match was praised as the kind of football that would throng Croke Park any Sunday. The Combined Universities v Rest of Ireland, sometimes called GAA Ireland, annual series of matches had had a joyous birth.

The Combined Universities team took part in exhibition games against the Rest of Ireland GAA or GAA Ireland team throughout the 1950s. These were halcyon days for University Gaelic sportsmen due to the high profile of these matches. From 1952 the annual match was a double-billed event of hurling and football. Many top players in both codes competed. While many games were well attended (15–20,000 spectators), these matches failed to arouse the same passion or allegiance associated with inter-club, inter-county or inter-provincial games. The Combined Universities hurling also suffered from a lack of highly talented players who could compete against the cream of inter-county hurling players. After the 1956 hurling game, this match was dropped. The Combined Universities versus GAA Ireland football games faded out in the 1960s despite attempts to spice up the annual series with matches against The Army and Inter-County sides.

The 1970s saw an expansion of the number of participating university colleges in both the Sigerson and Fitzgibbon Cup competitions. The removal of the GAA's Rule 27 in 1971 banning playing of 'foreign games' freed students to play sport in a much more open manner within the ethos of a broad university education and sporting life.

The Combined Universities concept was revived in 1972 with the admission of elite selections from the Sigerson and Fitzgibbon Cup competitions to the inter-provincial Railway Cup competition in their respective codes. The Central Council of the GAA agreed to a proposal from Comhairle na nOllscoil on a trial basis. The inter-provincial series had been flagging in terms of public interest and it was thought that the introduction of a competitive 'fifth province' would revive the popularity of the Railway Cup competitions by adding a new element of spice. In hurling the Combined Universities team did not match the stronger provinces. In football, the Combined Universities won the Railway Cup in 1973 by beating Connacht in the final at Athlone. However, after three years the foray of the Combined Universities into inter-provincial competition ended.

A further attempt to provide representative games emerged in 1976 when the Combined Universities played the Combined Services in both codes at The Mardyke, Cork. Following on the classic encounter in the first Hodges Figgis Trophy match between the Sigerson Cup and Trench Cup winners in 1976, the Advanced Colleges (a non-university combination) joined the football representative matches in 1977. The first football match between the Advanced Colleges Select and Combined Universities resulted in a win for the former. In 1978, Advanced Colleges beat Combined Services to play Combined Universities in a final match. With the Combined Services splitting into Garda and Irish Army teams in 1979, the football matches developed into a four-way mini-tournament format between these teams. Advanced Colleges joined the hurling tournament in 1981 to make this a four-team tournament. These series in varying formats continued until the mid-1990s.

Within the Universities and Advanced Colleges, selection for the representative teams carried considerable prestige, particularly for the smaller and less successful institutions. One of the major difficulties was finding dates for the matches that steered clear of inter-county and club fixtures. The last Combined Universities match took place in 2000 against a British Universities Select in Manchester to celebrate the Millennium.

== Gaelic Football ==
Year	Winners	Score	Against	Score	Where Played	Date
2000	Combined Universities	1–9	British Universities	0–9	Manchester	
1996	Combined Colleges	1–15	Garda	2–10	Garda Grounds, Westmanstown, Dublin	3 April 1996 (Final)
	Garda		Combined Sigerson		Garda Grounds, Westmanstown, Dublin	3 April 1996 (SF)
	Combined Colleges		Defence Forces		Garda Grounds, Westmanstown, Dublin	3 April 1996 (SF)
1995	Combined Sigerson	1–18	Garda	0–8	Garda Grounds, Westmanstown, Dublin	27 April 1995 (Final)
	Combined Sigerson		Defences Forces		Garda Grounds, Westmanstown, Dublin	27 April 1995 (SF)
	Garda		Combined Colleges		Garda Grounds, Westmanstown, Dublin	27 April 1995 (SF)
1994	Combined Sigerson	2–14	Garda	2–5	UCD Grounds, Belfield, Dublin	20 April 1994 (Final)
	Garda	1–11	Army	1–10	UCD Grounds, Belfield, Dublin	20 April 1994 (SF)
1993	Combined Colleges	1–14	Defence Forces	2–10	UCD Grounds, Belfield, Dublin	29 April 1993 (Final)
	Defence Forces	2–14	Combined Sigerson	1–8	UCD Grounds, Belfield, Dublin	21 April 1993 (SF)
1992	Defence Forces	1–12	Garda	0–10	UCD Grounds, Belfield, Dublin	1 April 1992(Final)
	Garda	1–15	Combined Sigerson	1–12	UCD Grounds, Belfield, Dublin	25 March 1992 (SF)
	Defence Forces	0–11	Combined Advanced Colleges	0–8	UCD Grounds, Belfield, Dublin	25 March 1992 (SF)
1991	Garda	2–11	Combined Sigerson	1–9	Parnell Park, Dublin	3 April 1991 (Final)
	Garda	2–9	Combined Colleges	0–7	TCD Grounds, Santry, Dublin	27 March 1991 (SF)
	Combined Sigerson	1–12	Defence Forces	0–10	UCD Grounds, Belfield, Dublin	27 March 1991 (SF)
1990						
1989	Garda	1–15	Combined Colleges	1–11	St Vincent's, Dublin	15 April 1989 (Final/ET)
	Garda	2–8	Combined Sigerson	0–7	TCD Grounds, Santry, Dublin	15 April 1989 (SF)
	Combined Colleges	1–12	Army	1–11	Glasnevin, Dublin	15 April 1989 (SF)
1988	Combined Colleges	0–16	Combined Sigerson	1–7	Coláiste Phádraig, Drumcondra	30 April 1988 (Final)
	Combined Sigerson	w/o	Garda	scr	Coláiste Phádraig, Drumcondra	30 April 1988 (SF)
	Combined Colleges	2–5	Army	0–10	Coláiste Phádraig, Drumcondra	30 April 1988 (SF)
1987	Combined Universities	0–11	Defence Forces	0–7	TCD Grounds, Santry, Dublin	8 April 1987 (Final)
	Defence Forces	2–8	Advanced Colleges	0–8	TCD Grounds, Santry, Dublin	1 April 1987 (SF)
	Combined Universities	4–12	Garda	1–17	Croke Park, Dublin	1 April 1987 (SF)
1986	Army	0–13	Combined Universities	0–5	Croke Park, Dublin	23 March 1986 (Final)
	Army	1–12	Allied Irish Banks	1–5	Army Grounds, Phoenix Park, Dublin	22 March 1986 (SF)
	Combined Universities	2–9	Advanced Colleges	1–5	Coláiste Phádraig, Drumcondra	22 March 1986 (SF)
1985	Advanced Colleges	0–9	Combined Universities	0–8	Croke Park, Dublin	25 April 1985 (Final)
	Advanced Colleges	1–17	Garda	0–9	TCD Grounds, Santry, Dublin	17 April 1985 (SF)
	Combined Universities	1–9	Army	0–12	Devlin Park, Dublin	17 April 1985 (SF)
1984	Army		Combined Universities		Pearse Stadium, Galway	23 April 1984 (Final)
	Combined Universities	0–19	Advanced Colleges	0–12	Renmore, County Galway	22 April 1984 (SF)
	Combined Universities	1–10	Garda	1–7	Croke Park, Dublin	4 April 1984 (R1)
1983	Advanced Colleges	1–12	Army	1–9	Croke Park, Dublin	20 April 1983 (Final)
	Advanced Colleges	2–8	Garda	2–6	Croke Park, Dublin	6 April 1983 (SF)
	Army	1–14	Combined Universities	1–8	Croke Park, Dublin	6 April 1983 (SF)
1982	Garda	3–8	Army	0–5	Croke Park, Dublin	28 April 1982 (Final)
	Army	2–11	Advanced Colleges	3–5	Croke Park, Dublin	14 April 1982 (SF)
	Garda	2–13	Combined Universities	2–9	Croke Park, Dublin	14 April 1982 (SF)
1981	Advanced Colleges	3–10	Army	2–12	Croke Park, Dublin	8 April 1981 Final)
	Army	1–12	Combined Universities	2–8	Croke Park, Dublin	25 March 1981 (SF)
1980	Army v Garda				Croke Park, Dublin	(Final)
	Army	3–15	Advanced Colleges	1–12	Croke Park, Dublin	16 April 1980 (SF)
	Garda	0–11	Combined Universities	1–7	Croke Park, Dublin	16 April 1980 (SF)
1979	Combined Universities	2–11	Garda	1–11	Devlin, Dublin	29 April 1979 (Final)
	Garda	3–10	Advanced Colleges	1–11	Croke Park, Dublin	4 March 1979 (SF)
1978	Combined Universities	2–9	Advanced Colleges	0–11	Croke Park, Dublin	9 April 1978 (Final)
	Advanced Colleges	2–14	Combined Services (Army & Garda)	2–9	Pairc Ciarán, Athlone	26 February 1978 (SF)
1977	Advanced Colleges	2–14	Combined Universities	2–9	Croke Park, Dublin	27 March 1977 (Final)
	Advanced Colleges	2–10	Combined Services (Army & Garda)	1–11	Croke Park, Dublin	6 March 1977 (SF)
1976	Combined Universities	0–10	State Services (Army & Garda)	0–7	The Mardyke, Cork	19 April 1976
1974	Combined Universities	1–8	Dublin	1–7	O'Toole Park, Crumlin, Dublin	12 January 1974
1973	Kildare	2–8	Combined Universities	1–10	Newbridge, County Kildare	14 January 1973
1966	Galway	2–9	Combined Universities	0–7	Tuam Stadium, County Galway	1 May 1966
1965	Galway	2–12	Combined Universities	0–13	Pearse Stadium, Galway	4 April 1965
1964	Abandoned					
1963	Kerry	4–7	Combined Universities	1–7	Croke Park, Dublin	24 March 1963
1962	Combined Universities	1–10	Rest of Ireland	0–6	Croke Park, Dublin	18 March 1962
1961	Rest of Ireland	3–13	Combined Universities	2–8	Croke Park, Dublin	19 March 1961 (Final)
	Combined Universities	2–10	The Army	1–7	Croke Park, Dublin	12 March 1961 (SF)
1960	Rest of Ireland	4–5	Combined Universities	3–2	Croke Park, Dublin	20 March 1960
1959						
1958	Combined Universities	0–12	G.A.A. Ireland	0–10	Croke Park, Dublin	4 May 1958
1957	G.A.A. Ireland	3–10	Combined Universities	3–6	Croke Park, Dublin	18 March 1957
1956	G.A.A. Ireland	2–14	Combined Universities	3–10	Croke Park, Dublin	18 March 1956
1955	Combined Universities	1–10	G.A.A. Ireland	2–5	Croke Park, Dublin	6 March 1955
1954	Combined Universities	2–8	Rest of Ireland	0–9	Croke Park, Dublin	7 March 1954
1953	Rest of Ireland	4–10	Combined Universities	0–7	Croke Park, Dublin	1 March 1953
1952	Rest of Ireland	2–4	Combined Universities	1–5	Croke Park, Dublin	2 March 1952
1951	Rest of Ireland	0–10	Combined Universities	0–9	Croke Park, Dublin	4 March 1951
1950	Rest of Ireland	1–12	Combined Universities	2–3	Croke Park, Dublin	26 February 1950
1947	Kerry	2–5	Combined Universities	1–5	Austin Stack Park, Tralee	4 May 1947

== Hurling ==
Year	Winners	Score	Against	Score	Where Played	Date
1996	Garda	2–12	Army	0–10	Westmanstown, Dublin	3 April 1996 (Final)
	Garda		Combined Fitzgibbon		Westmanstown, Dublin	3 April 1996 (SF)
	Army		Combined Colleges		Westmanstown, Dublin	3 April 1996 (SF)
1995	Combined Colleges	4–22	Defence Forces	0–10	Westmanstown, Dublin	27 April 1995 (Final)
	Combined Colleges		Garda		Westmanstown, Dublin	27 April 1995 (SF)
	Defence Forces		Combined Fitzgibbon		Westmanstown, Dublin	27 April 1995 (SF)
1994	Combined Colleges	4–17	Army	1–5	UCD Grounds, Belfield, Dublin	20 April 1994 (Final)
	Combined Colleges		Combined Fitzgibbon		UCD Grounds, Belfield, Dublin	20 April 1994 (SF)
1993	Combined Fitzgibbon	1–12	Combined Colleges	0–14	UCD Grounds, Belfield, Dublin	29 April 1993 (Final)
	Combined Fitzgibbon	4–17	Defence Forces	3–15	UCD Grounds, Belfield, Dublin	22 April 1993 (SF)
1992	Combined Fitzgibbon	2–18	Combined Advanced Colleges	0–9	UCD Grounds, Belfield, Dublin	1 April 1992 (Final)
	Combined Fitzgibbon	0–16	Garda	0–4	Belfield, Dublin	25 March 1992 (SF)
	Combined Advanced Colleges	2–7	Army	1–7	UCD Grounds, Belfield, Dublin	25 March 1992 (SF)
1991	Combined Colleges	3–11	Defence Forces	1–11	Parnell Park, Dublin	3 April 1991 (Final)
	Combined Colleges	1–12	Garda	1–9	TCD Grounds, Santry, Dublin	27 March 1991 (SF)
	Defence Forces	0–13	Combined Fitzgibbon	1–8	UCD Grounds, Belfield, Dublin	27 March 1991 (SF)
1990	Clare	3–14	Combined Colleges	0–8	Ennis, County Clare	16 April 1990 (Final)
	Clare	2–9	Combined Fitzgibbon	1–6	Ennis, County Clare	16 April 1990 (SF)
1989	Combined Fitzgibbon	1–16	Combined Colleges	1–11	UCD Grounds, Belfield, Dublin	29 April 1989(Final)
	Combined Colleges	2–8	Army	0–10	UCD Grounds, Belfield, Dublin	29 April 1989 (SF)
	Combined Fitzgibbon	4–10	Garda	2–12	UCD Grounds, Belfield, Dublin	29 April 1989 (SF)
1988	Combined Fitzgibbon	3–13	Garda	1–9	Coláiste Phádraig, Drumcondra	30 April 1988 (Final)
	Combined Fitzgibbon	5–5	Army	0–11	Army Grounds, Phoenix Park, Dublin	30 April 1988 (SF)
	Garda	0–17	Combined Colleges	0–10	Army Grounds, Phoenix Park, Dublin	30 April 1988 (SF)
1987	Defence Forces	6–8	Combined Universities	3–9	TCD Grounds, Santry, Dublin	8 April 1987 (Final)
	Defence Forces	3–9	Advanced Colleges	0–12	TCD Grounds, Santry, Dublin	1 April 1987 (SF)
	Combined Universities	2–17	Garda	2–12	Croke Park, Dublin	1 April 1987 (SF)
1986	Advanced Colleges	3–7	Army	0–8	Croke Park, Dublin	23 March 1986 (Final)
	Army	3–15	Allied Irish Banks	1–9	Army Grounds, Phoenix Park, Dublin	22 March 1986 (SF)
	Advanced Colleges	3–13	Combined Universities	2–5	Coláiste Phádraig, Drumcondra	22 March 1986 (SF)
1985	Garda	1–17	Combined Universities	0–16	Croke Park, Dublin	25 April 1985 (Final)
	Garda	2–13	Advanced Colleges	1–12	TCD Grounds, Santry, Dublin	18 April 1985 (SF)
	Combined Universities	2–6	The Army	1–7	Devlin Park, Dublin	18 April 1985 (SF)
1984	Advanced Colleges		Garda		Pearse Stadium, Galway	23 April 1984 (Final)
	Advanced Colleges	2–14	Combined Universities	1–8	Croke Park, Dublin	11 April 1984 (SF)
	Garda	3–11	The Army	3–9	Croke Park, Dublin	11 April 1984 (SF)
1983	Combined Universities	5–5	Advanced Colleges	0–11	Croke Park, Dublin	28 April 1983 (Final)
	Advanced Colleges	1–18	Garda	1–12	TCD Grounds, Santry, Dublin	21 April 1983 (SF)
	Combined Universities	2–16	The Army	1–17	TCD Grounds, Santry, Dublin	13 April 1983 (SF/ET)
1982	Advanced Colleges v					(Final)
	Combined Universities v Garda					(SF)
	Advanced Colleges	5–12	The Army	2–15	Croke Park, Dublin	28 April 1982 (SF/ET)
1981	Combined Universities	4–12	Advanced Colleges	3–7	Croke Park, Dublin	8 April 1981 (Final)
	Combined Universities	3–15	The Army	1–6	Croke Park, Dublin	25 March 1981 (SF)
1980	Combined Universities	1–11	Garda	2–6	Croke Park, Dublin	23 April 1980 (Final)
	Combined Universities	2–9	The Army	1–11	Croke Park, Dublin	9 April 1980 (SF)
1979	Combined Universities	2–7	Garda	0–9	Croke Park, Dublin	22 April 1979 (Final)
	Garda	6–10	Army	2–2	Army Grounds, Phoenix Park, Dublin	29 March 1979 (SF)
1978					Croke Park, Dublin	2 April 1978
1977	Combined Universities	2–11	Combined Services (Army & Garda)	1–9	Croke Park, Dublin	3 April 1977
1976	Combined Universities	3–13	Combined Services (Army & Garda)	4–8	Croke Park, Dublin	19 April 1976
1956	G.A.A. Ireland	4–12	Combined Universities	3–6	Croke Park, Dublin	18 March 1956
1955	Combined Universities & The Rest	2–6	G.A.A. Ireland	2–4	Croke Park, Dublin	6 March 1955
1954	G.A.A. Ireland	3–13	Universities & State Services	1–4	Croke Park, Dublin	7 March 1954
1953	Rest of Ireland	5–9	Combined Universities	3–2	Croke Park, Dublin	1 March 1953
1952	Rest of Ireland	3–14	Combined Universities	1–6	Croke Park, Dublin	2 March 1952
1931	Tipperary	3–6	NUI Colleges Select	0–0	Thurles, County Tipperary	19 April 1931

== Railway Cup ==
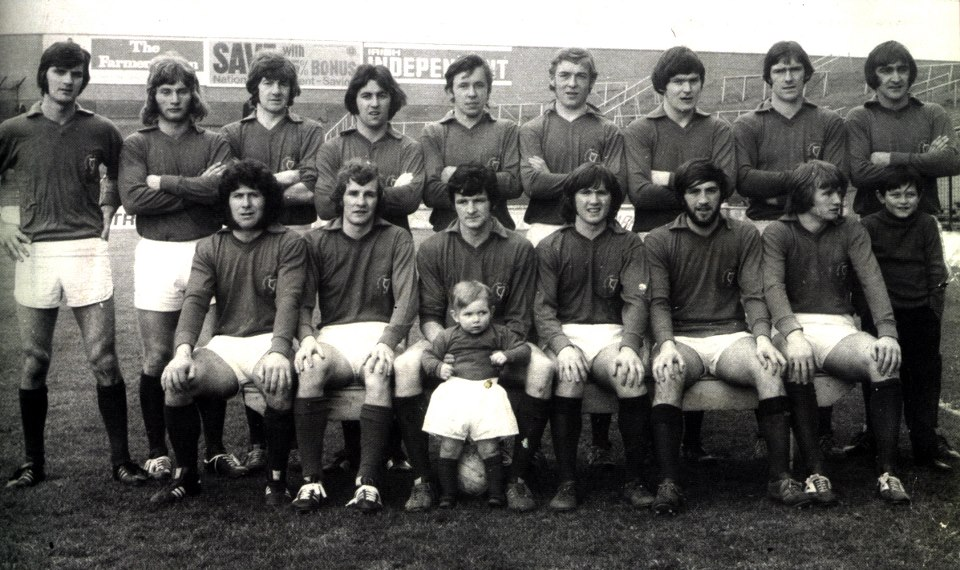
The Combined Universities Gaelic Football Team that played in the final of the GAA Inter-Provincial Championship, the Railway Cup, on 17 March 1973 at Croke Park, Dublin

In 1971 the Universities Council of the GAA (Comhairle na nOllscoil) applied to the Central Council of the GAA for permission to compete in the Railway Cup football and hurling series. The request had been studied by the Executive of the Central Council. The Universities Council estimated that there were about 70 inter-county players in the Sigerson and Fitzgibbon competitions studying at U.C.D, U.C.G., U.C.C., Q.U.B., T.C.D., U.U. Coleraine and St Patrick's Maynooth. At the Central Council meeting held on 23 October 1971, the proposal of Comhairle na nOllscoil was approved unanimously. While the idea was looked upon positively by some elements of the Press as a way of injecting life back into this inter-provincial tournament, other feared that the public would tire of this innovation as they had in the case of the Combined Universities v (Rest of) Ireland tests long before they lingered to an unlamented death and doubted whether the Combined Universities would revive the Railway Cup. Pat McDonnell of UCC and Cork full-back, Texaco Hurler of the Year in 1969, had the honour of captaining the first Combined Universities team to compete in the Railway Cup against Ulster at Croke Park. The university hurlers defeated Ulster in the preliminary round, but were narrowly beaten by Leinster in the semi-final, while the university footballers did not survive the preliminary round of the football Railway Cup.

In 1973 the Combined Universities footballers beat Connacht to win the Railway Cup in a final replay at Athlone. This is the only occasion in the history of the Railway Cup that it was not won by a provincial team. The hurlers again beat Ulster but were again beaten by Leinster in the semi-final. In 1974 both the university hurlers and footballers reached the semi-finals, losing to Munster and Leinster, respectively.

The Railway Cup experiment was meeting criticism from within the Universities sector because it was interfering with University League fixtures. In May 1974 Comhairle na nOllscoil decided to opt out of the Railway Cup competition. In lieu of Railway Cup participation, the Universities Committee proposed an annual match between Combined Universities and the Carrolls-sponsored All-Stars teams. There were no representative matches in 1975. The Management Committee of the GAA arranged for games between Combined Universities and the Carrolls All-Stars in Limerick on 25 January 1976 in aid the Northern Ireland Relief Fund. However, for a variety of reasons, these proposed representative games were abandoned. In April 1976 Combined Universities v State Services (Garda & Army) games took place at the Mardyke in Cork. These matches developed into a triangular series, and then the quadrangular series with the addition of Advanced Colleges, that lasted into the 1990s.

== Gaelic Football ==
Year	Winners	Score	Against	Score	Where Played	Date	Round
1974	Leinster	0–12	Combined Universities	0–9	Tullamore, County Offaly	10 February 1974	semi-final
	Combined Universities	1–7	Munster	1–4	U.C.C. Grounds, Cork	26 January 1974	Preliminary
1973	Combined Universities	4–9	Connacht	1–11	Páirc Ciarán, Athlone	23 April 1973	Final Replay
	Connacht	0–18	Combined Universities	2–12	Croke Park, Dublin	17 March 1973	Final
	Combined Universities	0–11	Leinster	0–8	Croke Park, Dublin	18 February 1973	semi-final
	Combined Universities	2–7	Ulster	0–12	Breffni Park, Cavan	28 January 1973	Preliminary
1972	Connacht	1–15	Combined Universities	1–9	Dr Douglas Hyde Park, Roscommon	13 February 1972	Preliminary

- Combined Universities Captains
  - 1974:
  - 1973: Paud Lynch (UCC & Kerry)/Brendan Lynch (UCC & Kerry)
  - 1972:

== Hurling ==
Year	Winners	Score	Against	Score	Where Played	Date	Round
1974	Munster	5–11	Combined Universities	2–7	Limerick Gaelic Grounds	17 February 1974	semi-final
	Combined Universities	4–10	Ulster	2–7	Croke Park, Dublin	27 January 1974	Preliminary
1973	Leinster	4–13	Combined Universities	0–9	Croke Park, Dublin	18 February 1973	semi-final
	Combined Universities	6–13	Ulster	1–7	Croke Park, Dublin	28 January 1973	Preliminary
1972	Leinster	3–12	Combined Universities	2–13	Croke Park, Dublin	20 February 1972	semi-final
	Combined Universities	0–14	Ulster	1–7	Croke Park, Dublin	6 February 1972	Preliminary

- Combined Universities Captains
  - 1974:
  - 1973: John Buckley (UCC & Cork)
  - 1972: Pat McDonnell (UCC & Cork)
