= Pádraig Brehony =

Irish hurler

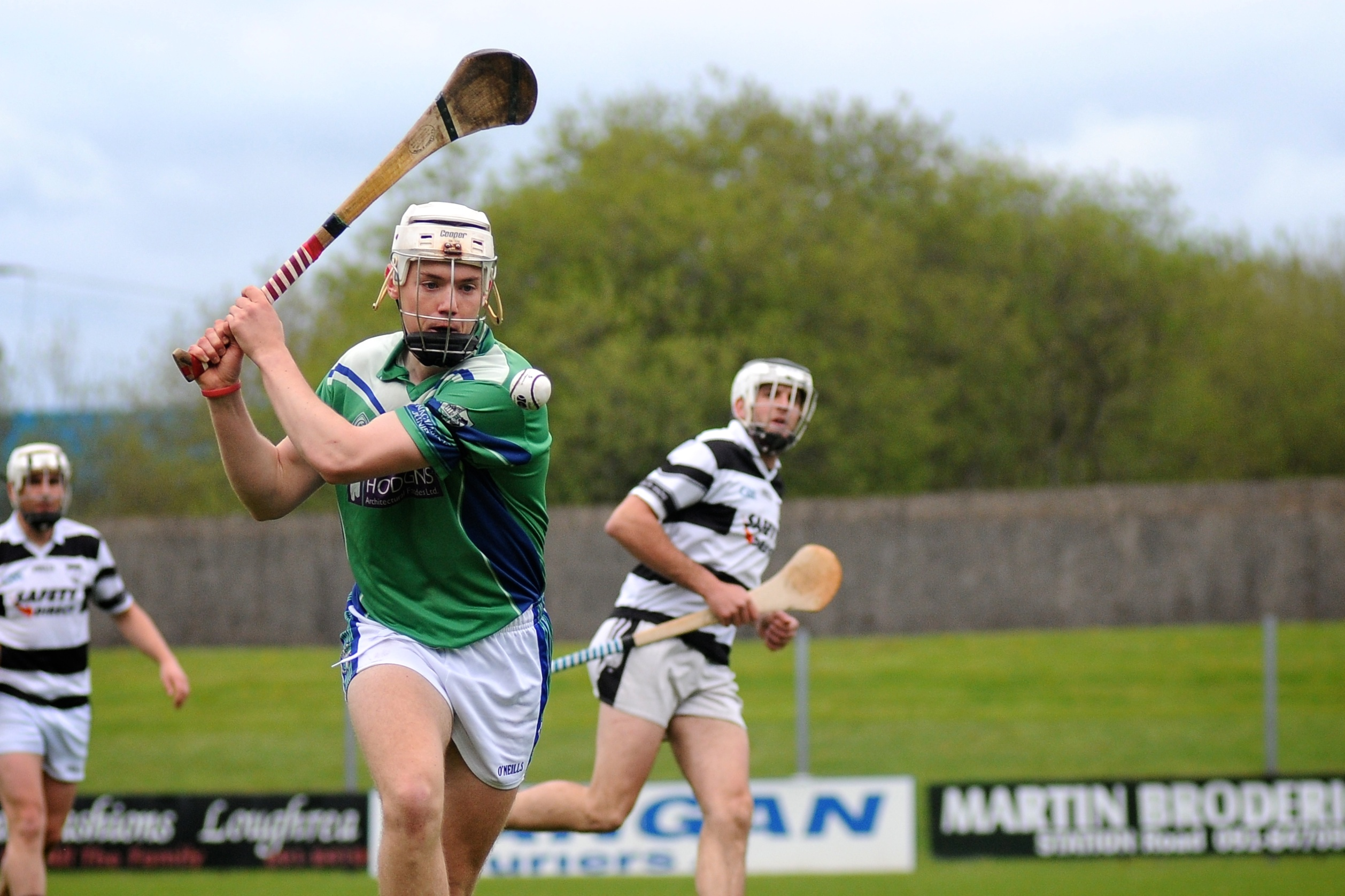
- Pádraig Brehony (in the green top) in 2014

Personal information
- Native name: Pádraig Ó Breithiúnagh (Irish)
- Born: 28 January 1993 (age 33) Galway, Ireland
- Height: 1.81 m (5 ft 11 in)

Sport
- Sport: Hurling
- Position: Midfield
Club
- Years: Club
- 2010-: Tynagh-Abbey/Duniry
Inter-county
Years	County	Apps (scores)
2012-	Galway	25 (0-6)
Inter-county titles
- Leinster titles: 1
- NHL: 1

Pádraig Brehony (born 28 January 1993) is an Irish hurler who plays as a forward for the Galway senior team. At club level he plays with Tynagh-Abbey/Duniry.

Brehony was part of the Galway minor team that won the All-Ireland title in 2011 where he scored 0–4 in the final against Dublin.
