= Eoin Kelly (London hurler) =

Irish hurler

Personal information
- Native name: Eoin Ó Ceallaigh (Irish)
- Nickname: Red
- Born: 1988 (age 37–38) Lusmagh, County Offaly, Ireland
- Occupations: Health and safety officer

Sport
- Sport: Hurling
- Position: Midfielder
Clubs
- Years: Club
- Lusmagh; St Gabriel's
Club titles
- London titles: 1
Inter-county*
Years	County	Apps (scores)
2010-2012 2014-	Offaly; London	1 (0-00); 4 (1-30)
Inter-county titles
- Leinster titles: 0
- All-Irelands: 0
- NHL: 0
- All Stars: 0
- *Inter County team apps and scores correct as of 14:10, 28 June 2014.

Eoin Kelly an Irish hurler who plays as a midfielder at senior level for the London county team.

Born in Lusmagh, County Offaly, Kelly first arrived on the inter-county scene when he linked up with the Offaly senior team, making his debut in the 2010 National Hurling League. He later joined the London senior team.

At club level Kelly is one-time championship medallist with St Gabriel's. He began his club career with Lusmagh.

== Honours ==
Lusmagh

- Offaly Intermediate Hurling Championship (1): 2012

St Gabriel's

- London Senior Hurling Championship (1): 2013
