= Michael Herron =

Irish hurler

Personal information
- Born: 1986 (age 39–40) Belfast, Northern Ireland
- Occupation: Physiotherapist
- Height: 6 ft 0 in (183 cm)

Sport
- Sport: Hurling
- Position: Centre-back
Club
- Years: Club
- 2003-present: Lámh Dhearg
Club titles
- Antrim titles: 0
Inter-county*
Years	County	Apps (scores)
2004-present	Antrim	31 (3-26)
Inter-county titles
- Ulster titles: 3
- Leinster titles: 0
- All-Irelands: 0
- NHL: 0
- All Stars: 0
- *Inter County team apps and scores correct as of 18:23, 27 February 2012.

Michael Herron (born 1986) is an Irish hurler who currently plays as a centre-back and vice-captain of the Antrim senior team.

A brother of Antrim hurlers Ciarán and Brendan, Herron made his first appearance for the team during the 2004 championship and has become a regular member of the starting fifteen since then. During that time he won three Ulster winners' medals.

At club level Herron plays hurling and Gaelic football with Lámh Dhearg.
