= Kevin Ryan (hurler) =

Irish hurler

Personal information
- Native name: Caoimhín Ó Riain (Irish)
- Born: 1965 (age 60–61) Waterford, Ireland
- Occupation: Production manager

Sport
- Sport: Hurling
- Position: Midfield
Club
- Years: Club
- Mount Sion
Club titles
- Waterford titles: 5
Inter-county
Years	County	Apps (scores)
1980–1989	Waterford	8 (0-00)
Inter-county titles
- Munster titles: 0
- All-Irelands: 0
- NHL: 0
- All Stars: 0

Kevin Ryan (born 1965) is an Irish former hurler who played in various positions for the Waterford senior hurling team.

Ryan made his first appearance for the team during the 1980–81 National League and became a regular member of the starting fifteen over the next decade. During that time he played a part in securing Waterford's promotion from Division 3 to the top flight of the National League. Ryan ended up as Munster runner-up on two occasions.

At club level Ryan is a multiple county club championship medalist with Mount Sion.

In retirement from playing Ryan became involved in team management. He first coached club sides Mount Sion and Oulart the Ballagh, before later serving as a selector and manager with the Waterford and Carlow senior hurling teams. He was appointed as the manager of the Offaly manager in 2017, and officially stepped down in 2018. He made a statement saying, "I feel my reappointment would be divisive and make progress for Offaly hurling extremely difficult."

== Playing career ==
=== Club ===
Ryan had a successful career with Mount Sion GAA club.

In 1981 he won his first county championship medal following a 4–13 to 1–14 defeat of Dunhill. Mount Sion later claimed the provincial club title, however, Ryan played no part in that game. The All-Ireland final defeat saw Mount Sion play Kilkenny and Leinster champions James Stephens. Ryan came on as a substitute, however, James Stephens won the game by 3–13 to 3–8.

After surrendering their club title the following year, Ryan added a second county championship medal to his collection in 1983.

A 0–16 to 0–10 defeat of Lismore in the 1986 county decider gave Ryan a third championship medal.

Two years later he won his fourth medal following a 2–15 to 3–8 defeat of Ballygunner.

After an absence of six years and the loss of two county finals in the meantime, Ryan won a fifth and final championship medal in 1994.

=== Inter-county ===
Ryan first came to prominence on the inter-county scene with the Waterford senior hurling team, making his debut in a National League game against Cork in late 1980.

Two years later in 1982 Ryan lined out in his first Munster decider. Cork provided the opposition on that occasion as a rout unfolded. A 5–31 to 3–6 defeat was one of the biggest in the history of the provincial championship.

Ryan's side reached the Munster final for a second successive year in 1983. Cork once again provided the opposition and, once again, a rout developed. The margin of victory was smaller for Cork, however, they still defeated Ryan's side by 3–22 to 0–12.

After a few disappointing seasons Waterford found themselves in Division 3 of the National League at the start of the 1985–86 season. Ryan was a key member of the team that year as "the Déise" fought their way to promotion and a place in Division 2. Another successful league campaign saw Ryan's side rejoin the top table the following year.

By 1989 Ryan had been relegated to the substitutes. He made one appearance in the championship that year but was unused in Waterford's defeat by Tipperary in the Munster decider.

== Managerial career ==
=== Management ===
Ryan's first taste of hurling management was developed early when he was trainer and a selector of the Mount Sion under-21 team on which he was still a player. By the late nineties he had taken charge of the Mount Sion minor team, winning two county championships in three years before graduating to the under 21 team again.

In 1999 Ryan was manager of the Mount Sion senior hurling team. As reigning champions they surrendered their title to Ballygunner, however, Ryan's Mount Sion side were back the following year to exact revenge. A 1–20 to 0–9 defeat of Ballygunner gave the club the county championship title for the 31st time. The club later reached the provincial decider but lost out to Sixmilebridge.

Ryan had taken charge of Wexford side Oulart the Ballagh by 2007. He guided the club to their sixth county championship that year following a 4–14 to 2–6 trouncing of Buffer's Alley.

=== Waterford ===
In 2003 Ryan first became involved with an inter-county team when he was appointed as a Waterford selector under Justin McCarthy. In his debut year as a selector Waterford reached the provincial showpiece for a third successive year in 2004. In the Munster final, Waterford defeated Cork for the first time in forty-five years to take the title by 3–16 to 1–21.

After two disappointing seasons in 2005 and 2006, Ryan stepped down as a selector at the start of 2007.

=== Carlow ===
Ryan took up his first inter-county managerial position in 2008 when he took over as manager of the Carlow senior and under-21 hurling teams.

In his first year in charge Ryan guided Carlow to a second successive Christy Ring Cup title following a 1–15 to 0–14 defeat of Down. This victory also secured promotion to the Leinster Senior Hurling Championship.

In his final season in charge, Ryan's Carlow secured the National League Division 2A title following a defeat of Westmeath. This victory brought promotion to Division 1B for 2013.

Following Carlow's exit from the 2012 championship, Ryan stepped down as manager.

=== Antrim ===
In 2012 Ryan took over as manager of the Antrim senior hurling team after "the Saffrons" suffered a turbulent season on and off the field leaving during the summer of 2015.He admitted that "they were always passionate about their game and I like that."

=== Tyrone ===
In 2016 he took over as manager of the Tyrone senior hurling team. He took change of their Nicky Rackard Cup campaign.

Offaly

On 5 November 2017, Midlands 103 reported that Ryan had been appointed Offaly senior hurling manager on a four-year contract with selector, former Waterford star Paul Flynn. In July 2018, Ryan stepped down as Offaly senior hurling team manager after just one season in charge after heavy defeats to Galway and Waterford in the 2017 championship.

Sporting positions
Preceded by	Waterford Senior Hurling Captain; 1988	Succeeded by
Preceded by Tom Mullally	Carlow Under-21 Hurling Manager; 2008–2011	Succeeded by Paul Flynn
Preceded by Jim Greene	Carlow Senior Hurling Manager; 2008–2012	Succeeded by John Meyler
Preceded by Jim Nelson	Antrim Senior Hurling Manager; 2012–2015	Succeeded by P. J. O'Mullan
Preceded by Dominic Kearns	Tyrone Senior Hurling Manager; 2016	Succeeded by John Devlin
Preceded by Éamonn Kelly	Offaly Senior Hurling Manager; 2016–2017	Succeeded by Kevin Martin
