= Cormac Donnelly =

Irish hurler and coach

Personal information
- Native name: Cormac Ó Donnaile (Irish)
- Born: 1989 (age 36–37) Ballycastle, County Antrim
- Occupation: Butcher
- Height: 6 ft 3 in (191 cm)

Sport
- Sport: Hurling
- Position: Full-back
Club
- Years: Club
- 2006–present: McQuillans, Ballycastle
Club titles
- Antrim titles: 0
Inter-county*
Years	County	Apps (scores)
2008–present	Antrim	14 (0–2)
Inter-county titles
- Ulster titles: 5
- Leinster titles: 0
- All-Irelands: 0
- NHL: 0
- All Stars: 0
- *Inter County team apps and scores correct as of 16:54 20 February 2012.

Cormac Donnelly (born 1989) is an Irish hurling coach and former player as a full-back at senior level for the Antrim county team.

Donnelly made his first appearance for the team during the 2008 championship and has become a regular player over the last few seasons. During that time he has won three Ulster winners' medals and a Walsh Cup winners' medal.

At club level Donnelly plays with the McQuillans, Ballycastle club.

In December 2020, himself and Dominic McKinley were named as head coaches of the senior Derry county hurling team.

== Honours ==
- 5 Ulster Senior Hurling Championships (2008, 2009, 2010, 2011, 2012)
- 1 Walsh Cup (2008)
- 2 Ulster Under-21 Hurling Championships (2009, 2010)
- 2 Ulster Minor Hurling Championships (2006, 2007)
