= Jim Nelson (hurling manager) =

Irish hurling manager

James Nelson (1938 – 9 March 2015) was an Irish hurling manager from Antrim.

He was the manager of the Antrim team that reached the 1989 All-Ireland Senior Hurling Championship Final against Tipperary, which was Antrim's first final in 46 years.
