= David English (hurler) =

Irish hurler

Personal information
- Native name: David English (Irish)

Sport
- Sport: Hurling
- Position: Midfield
Club titles
- Carlow titles: 0
Inter-county
- Years: County
- Carlow
Inter-county titles
- Leinster titles: 0
- All-Irelands: 0
- NHL: 0
- All Stars: 0

David English is an Irish hurler who plays in midfield for the Carlow senior team. In the 2013 Leinster Senior Hurling Championship, English scored 10 points against Wexford in a 2–16 to 0–20 defeat.
