= List of Shinty-Hurling international matches between Ireland and Scotland =

The first known international fixture between a Scottish shinty team and Irish hurling team occurred in 1896, when the London Camanchd and London GAA local clubs met in a friendly. The following year, the first official series featuring an amalgamation of rules from both sports, occurred at Celtic Park in Scotland between Glasgow Cowal and Dublin Celtic. International tests between all-Scotland and all-Ireland teams were played intermittently prior to World War II. There were several attempts to establish regular meetings dating back to the Tailteann Games in 1928. However, anti-British sentiment within the GAA prevented a formalised series from occurring until the 1970s. It was not until 2003 that the Camanachd Association and the Gaelic Athletic Association committed to a yearly series, known as the Shinty–Hurling International Series. To date 44 fixtures have been played with Ireland winning 22 matches, Scotland winning 19 matches, and three draws.

== Summary ==
=== Overall ===
Up to date as end of 2026 fixture

Country	Matches won	Matches drawn	Win%
(Republic of Ireland) Ireland	22	3	50%
Scotland	19	3	43.18%

=== Records ===
Note: Date shown in brackets indicates when the record was last set.

Record	Ireland	Scotland
Longest winning streak	7 (13 November 2010 – 2 November 2013)	5 (30 September 1995 – 1999)
Largest points for
Home	8-11 (51) (27 October 2012)*	3-15 (24) (24 October 2015)
Away	3-10 (25) (20 October 2012)*	5-11 (26) (2 November 2019)
Largest winning margin
Home	28 (27 October 2012)*	11 (13 October 2007)
Away	8 (8 June 1974, 25 October 2003)	22 (2 November 2019)
^{*} Goals in 2012 series worth 5 points

== Results ==
Below is a table of all of the documented Shinty-Hurling international matches between Ireland and Scotland including those of the Shinty–Hurling International Series which began in 2003.

No.	Date	Result	Venue	Winner	International Series winner	Reference
1	3 August 1924	Scotland 2 Ireland 1	Croke Park, Dublin	Scotland	—N/a	
2	29 June 1932	Ireland 6 Scotland 1		(Republic of Ireland) Ireland	—N/a	
3	1947	Ireland 3 Scotland 2	Edinburgh	(Republic of Ireland) Ireland	—N/a	
4	5 August 1972	Ireland 6–4 Scotland 4–5	Bught Park, Inverness	(Republic of Ireland) Ireland	—N/a	
5	19 May 1973	Ireland 2–16 Scotland 2–7	Croke Park, Dublin	(Republic of Ireland) Ireland	—N/a	
6	8 June 1974	Ireland 3–8 Scotland 1–6	Bught Park, Inverness	(Republic of Ireland) Ireland	—N/a	
7	7 August 1976	Scotland 5 Ireland 5	Old Anniesland, Glasgow	Draw	—N/a	
8	28 May 1977	Ireland 5 Scotland 1	Páirc Uí Chaoimh, Cork	(Republic of Ireland) Ireland	—N/a	
9	1 July 1978	Ireland 7 Scotland 3	An Aird, Fort William	(Republic of Ireland) Ireland	—N/a	
10	12 July 1979	Ireland 7 Scotland 3	Port E Chee Rugby Grounds, Douglas, Isle of Man	(Republic of Ireland) Ireland	—N/a	
11	26 September 1993	Scotland 4 Ireland 2	Bught Park, Inverness	Scotland	—N/a	
12	2 October 1994	Ireland 3 Scotland 3	Athenry	Draw	—N/a	
13	30 September 1995	Scotland 5 Ireland 4	An Aird, Fort William	Scotland	—N/a	
14	28 September 1996	Scotland 3-8 Ireland 0-10	Cusack Park, Ennis	Scotland	—N/a	
15	15 November 1997	Scotland 3-8 Ireland 1-9	Bught Park, Inverness	Scotland	—N/a	
16	15 March 1998	Scotland 0-12 Ireland 0-7	Nowlan Park, Kilkenny	Scotland	—N/a	
17	13 March 1999	Scotland 3-6 (15); Ireland 2-1 (7)	Bught Park, Inverness	Scotland	—N/a	
18	25 October 2003	Ireland 5–9 (24); Scotland 1–13 (16)	Bught Park, Inverness	(Republic of Ireland) Ireland	Ireland	
19	16 October 2004	Ireland 3–10 (19); Scotland 4–7 (19)	Seán Eiffe Park, Ratoath	Draw	—N/a	
20	8 October 2005	Scotland 4–8 (20); Ireland 2–11 (17)	Bught Park, Inverness	Scotland	Scotland	
21	5 November 2006	Scotland 2–13 (19); Ireland 2–5 (11)	Croke Park, Dublin	Scotland	Scotland	
22	13 October 2007	Scotland 4–10 (22); Ireland 0–11 (11)	An Aird, Fort William	Scotland	Scotland	
23	18 October 2008	Scotland 1–10 (13); Ireland 1–9 (12)	Nowlan Park, Kilkenny	Scotland	Scotland	
24	31 October 2009	Ireland 1–11 (14); Scotland 1–8 (11)	Bught Park, Inverness	(Republic of Ireland) Ireland	Ireland	
25	30 October 2010	Ireland 2–15 (21); Scotland 2–16 (22)	Croke Park, Dublin	Scotland	Ireland win 7–21 (42) to 5–23 (38) on aggregate	
26	13 November 2010	Scotland 3–7 (16); Ireland 5–6 (21)	Bught Park, Inverness	(Republic of Ireland) Ireland	Ireland win 7–21 (42) to 5–23 (38) on aggregate	
27	22 October 2011	Ireland 1–16 (19); Scotland 2–8 (14)	Geraldine Park, Athy	(Republic of Ireland) Ireland	Ireland win 3–25 (36) to 3–19 (28) on aggregate	
28	29 October 2011	Scotland 1–11 (14); Ireland 2–9 (15)	Bught Park, Inverness	(Republic of Ireland) Ireland	Ireland win 3–25 (36) to 3–19 (28) on aggregate	
29	20 October 2012	Scotland 2–9 (19); Ireland 3–10 (25)	Bught Park, Inverness	(Republic of Ireland) Ireland	Ireland win 11–21 (76) to 6–12 (42) on aggregate	
30	27 October 2012	Ireland 8–11 (51); Scotland 4–3 (23)	Cusack Park, Ennis	(Republic of Ireland) Ireland	Ireland win 11–21 (76) to 6–12 (42) on aggregate	
31	26 October 2013	Ireland 4–12 (24); Scotland 2–12 (18)	Croke Park, Dublin	(Republic of Ireland) Ireland	Ireland win 5–27 (42) to 2–26 (32) on aggregate	
32	2 November 2013	Scotland 0–14 (14); Ireland 1–15 (18)	Bught Park, Inverness	(Republic of Ireland) Ireland	Ireland win 5–27 (42) to 2–26 (32) on aggregate	
33	18 October 2014	Scotland 3–14 (23); Ireland 2–8 (14)	Bught Park, Inverness	Scotland	Ireland win 4–26 (38) to 3–22 (31) on aggregate	
34	25 October 2014	Ireland 2–18 (24); Scotland 0–8 (8)	Pairc Esler, Newry	(Republic of Ireland) Ireland	Ireland win 4–26 (38) to 3–22 (31) on aggregate	
35	24 October 2015	Scotland 3–15 (24); Ireland 2–8 (14)	Bught Park, Inverness	Scotland	Draw†	
36	21 November 2015	Ireland 2–10 (16); Scotland 2–8 (14)	Croke Park, Dublin	(Republic of Ireland) Ireland	Draw†	
37	22 October 2016	Scotland 0–14 (14); Ireland 0–5 (5)	Bught Park, Inverness	Scotland	Scotland	
38	21 October 2017	Scotland 2-12 (18); Ireland 0-15 (15)	Bught Park, Inverness	Scotland	Scotland	
39	20 October 2018	Scotland 1-11 (14); Ireland 1-9 (12)	Bught Park, Inverness	Scotland	Scotland	
40	2 November 2019	Scotland 5-11 (26); Ireland 0-4 (4)	Abbotstown	Scotland	Scotland	
The 2020–2022 fixtures were postponed by agreement of the Camanachd Association and the GAA due to the COVID-19 pandemic.
41	21 October 2023	Ireland 0-22 (22); Scotland 2-08 (14)	Páirc Esler, Newry	(Republic of Ireland) Ireland	Ireland	
42	26 October 2024	Ireland 3-16 (25); Scotland 5-07 (22) (a.e.t.)	Cusack Park, Ennis	(Republic of Ireland) Ireland	Ireland	
43	25 October 2025	Ireland 3-03 (12); Scotland 2-04 (10)	Bught Park, Inverness	(Republic of Ireland) Ireland	Ireland	
44	24 October 2026	Ireland 2-17 (23) Scotland 4-12 (24)	Páirc Uí Chaoimh, Cork	Scotland	Scotland	
†According to the GAA the two 2015 matches were played as stand alone fixtures; as such no aggregate scoring was used, resulting in a 1-1 overall result

=== Notable Shinty-Hurling matches ===
Below is a table of other notable shinty-hurling matches that did not feature the full Irish or Scottish international sides.

Date	Result	Venue	Winner	Reference
26 December 1896	London GAA 3 London Scottish 0	Lea Bridge, London	London GAA	
19 April 1897	Glasgow Cowal 11 Dublin Celtic 2	Celtic Park, Glasgow	Glasgow Cowal	
17 July 1897	Glasgow Cowal 2 Dublin Celtic 0	Jones Road, Dublin	Glasgow Cowal	
May 1901	Glasgow Caledonian 5 Rapparees 2	Possilpark, Glasgow	Glasgow Caledonian	
5 August 1922	Skye 5–1 Glasgow GAA 3–0		Skye	
6 May 1933	Combined Universities GAA 1 Southern Scottish Shinty League 0	Shieldhall Park, Glasgow	Combined Universities GAA	

== See also ==
- Shinty–Hurling International Series
- Ireland national hurling team
- Scotland national shinty team
