= Shinty–Hurling International Series =

Annual shinty-hurling sports competition

- Sport: Composite rules shinty–hurling
- First season: 2003
- Organising body: Gaelic Athletic Association; Camanachd Association
- No. of teams: 2
- Country: Scotland (Republic of Ireland) Ireland
- Continent: Europe
- Most recent champion: Scotland (9) (2026)
- Most titles: (Republic of Ireland) Ireland (10)
- Broadcasters: BBC Two (Scotland); TG4 (Ireland); RTÉ Two (Ireland)
- Sponsor: Mowi

The Shinty/Hurling International is a sports competition played annually between the Ireland national hurling team (selected by the Gaelic Athletic Association) and Scotland national shinty team (selected by the Camanachd Association). The series is conducted according to the rules of shinty–hurling, which is a hybrid sport consisting of a mixture of rules from the Gaelic sports of Scottish shinty and Irish hurling. The competition is currently sponsored by Mowi and is officially known as the Mowi Shinty/Hurling International.

== History ==
The first known fixture between a Scottish shinty team and Irish hurling team occurred in 1896, when the London Scottish Camanachd Club and London GAA met in a friendly. The following year, the first official series featuring an amalgamation of rules from both sports, occurred at Celtic Park in Scotland between Glasgow Cowal and Dublin Celtic. International tests between all-Scotland and all-Ireland teams were played intermittently prior to World War II. There were several attempts to establish regular meetings dating back to the Tailteann Games in 1928. However, anti-British sentiment within the GAA prevented a formalised series from occurring until the 1970s. The Camanachd Association and the Gaelic Athletic Association held discussions but it was not until 2003 that they committed to a yearly series, though in recent years the series has been changed from a single test series to a two test aggregate points series.

In 2013, a sport, known as Iomain, which incorporates a stick that is created specifically for the hybrid game, was trialled at Croke Park, with a view to it being introduced as a replacement for the current series.

Following a three year absence during the Covid-19 pandemic, it was announced that the series would return in autumn 2023. Ireland won the two subsequent internationals 0-22 to 2-08 and 3-16 and 5-7.

Currently, the scoring system operates as follows:

- Goal = 3 points
- Over = 1 point (from general run of play)

== All-time standings ==
This table only refers to matches played since the inception of regular Shinty–Hurling International Series fixtures in 2003. See List of Shinty-Hurling international matches between Ireland and Scotland for table including full list of fixtures.

=== Men ===
Up to date as of 2026 fixture

Country	Series won	Series drawn	Matches won	Matches drawn	Total scores
(Republic of Ireland) Ireland	10	2	14	1	57–290 (488)^{*}
Scotland	9	2	12	1	62–273 (471)^{*}
^{*} Goals in 2012 series worth 5 points

=== Records ===
Note: Date shown in brackets indicates when the record was last set.

Record	Ireland	Scotland
Longest winning streak	7 (13 November 2010 – 2 November 2013)	4 (22 October 2016 – 2 November 2019)
Largest points for
Home	8-11 (51) (27 October 2012)*	3-15 (24) (24 October 2015)
Away	3-10 (25) (20 October 2012)*	5-11 (26) (2 November 2019)
Largest winning margin
Home	28 (27 October 2012)*	11 (13 October 2007)
Away	8 (25 October 2003)	22 (2 November 2019)
^{*} Goals in 2012 series worth 5 points

== Results ==
The list below only refers to all matches played between Ireland and Scotland since the inception of regular Shinty/Hurling International fixtures in 2003.

=== Men ===
No.	Date	Result	Venue	Winner	Series winner	Reference
1	25 October 2003	Ireland 5–9 (24); Scotland 1–13 (16)	Bught Park, Inverness	(Republic of Ireland) Ireland	Ireland	
2	16 October 2004	Ireland 3–10 (19); Scotland 4–7 (19)	Seán Eiffe Park, Ratoath	Draw		
3	8 October 2005	Scotland 4–8 (20); Ireland 2–11 (17)	Bught Park, Inverness	Scotland	Scotland	
4	5 November 2006	Scotland 2–13 (19); Ireland 2–5 (11)	Croke Park, Dublin	Scotland	Scotland	
5	13 October 2007	Scotland 4–10 (22); Ireland 0–11 (11)	An Aird, Fort William	Scotland	Scotland	
6	18 October 2008	Scotland 1–10 (13); Ireland 1–9 (12)	Nowlan Park, Kilkenny	Scotland	Scotland	
7	31 October 2009	Ireland 1–11 (14); Scotland 1–8 (11)	Bught Park, Inverness	(Republic of Ireland) Ireland	Ireland	
8	30 October 2010	Ireland 2–15 (21); Scotland 2–16 (22)	Croke Park, Dublin	Scotland	Ireland win 7–21 (42) to 5–23 (38) on aggregate	
9	13 November 2010	Scotland 3–7 (16); Ireland 5–6 (21)	Bught Park, Inverness	(Republic of Ireland) Ireland	Ireland win 7–21 (42) to 5–23 (38) on aggregate	
10	22 October 2011	Ireland 1–16 (19); Scotland 2–8 (14)	Geraldine Park, Athy	(Republic of Ireland) Ireland	Ireland win 3–25 (36) to 3–19 (28) on aggregate	
11	29 October 2011	Scotland 1–11 (14); Ireland 2–9 (15)	Bught Park, Inverness	(Republic of Ireland) Ireland	Ireland win 3–25 (36) to 3–19 (28) on aggregate	
12	20 October 2012	Scotland 2–9 (19); Ireland 3–10 (25)	Bught Park, Inverness	(Republic of Ireland) Ireland	Ireland win 11–21 (76) to 6–12 (42) on aggregate	
13	27 October 2012	Ireland 8–11 (51); Scotland 4–3 (23)	Cusack Park, Ennis	(Republic of Ireland) Ireland	Ireland win 11–21 (76) to 6–12 (42) on aggregate	
14	26 October 2013	Ireland 4–12 (24); Scotland 2–12 (18)	Croke Park, Dublin	(Republic of Ireland) Ireland	Ireland win 5–27 (42) to 2–26 (32) on aggregate	
15	2 November 2013	Scotland 0–14 (14); Ireland 1–15 (18)	Bught Park, Inverness	(Republic of Ireland) Ireland	Ireland win 5–27 (42) to 2–26 (32) on aggregate	
16	18 October 2014	Scotland 3–14 (23); Ireland 2–8 (14)	Bught Park, Inverness	Scotland	Ireland win 4–26 (38) to 3–22 (31) on aggregate	
17	25 October 2014	Ireland 2–18 (24); Scotland 0–8 (8)	Pairc Esler, Newry	(Republic of Ireland) Ireland	Ireland win 4–26 (38) to 3–22 (31) on aggregate	
18	24 October 2015	Scotland 3–15 (24); Ireland 2–8 (14)	Bught Park, Inverness	Scotland	Draw†	
19	21 November 2015	Ireland 2–10 (16); Scotland 2–8 (14)	Croke Park, Dublin	(Republic of Ireland) Ireland	Draw†	
20	22 October 2016	Scotland 0–14 (14); Ireland 0–5 (5)	Bught Park, Inverness	Scotland	Scotland	
21	21 October 2017	Scotland 2-12 (18); Ireland 0-15 (15)	Bught Park, Inverness	Scotland	Scotland	
22	20 October 2018	Scotland 1-11 (14); Ireland 1-9 (12)	Bught Park, Inverness	Scotland	Scotland	
23	2 November 2019	Scotland 5-11 (26); Ireland 0-4 (4)	Abbotstown	Scotland	Scotland	
The 2020–2022 fixtures were postponed by agreement of the Camanachd Association and the GAA due to the COVID-19 pandemic.
24	21 October 2023	Ireland 0–22 (22); Scotland 2–8 (14)	Páirc Esler, Newry	(Republic of Ireland) Ireland	Ireland	
25	26 October 2024	Ireland 3-16 (25); Scotland 5-07 (22) (a.e.t.)	Cusack Park, Ennis	(Republic of Ireland) Ireland	Ireland	
26	25 October 2025	Ireland 3-03 (12); Scotland 2-04 (10)	Bught Park, Inverness	(Republic of Ireland) Ireland	Ireland	
27	24 October 2026	Ireland 2-17 (23) Scotland 4-12 (24)	Páirc Uí Chaoimh, Cork	Scotland	Scotland	
†According to the GAA the two 2015 matches were played as stand alone fixtures; as such no aggregate scoring was used, resulting in a 1-1 overall result

=== Women ===
The women's game is also referred to as shinty–camogie. The following is a table of recent results.

No.	Year	Date	Host nation	Result	Venue	Series winner	Reference
1	2003	October 25	Scotland	Scotland 1–13 (16); Ireland 5–9 (24)	Bught Park, Inverness	(Republic of Ireland) Ireland	
2	2004	October 16	(Republic of Ireland) Ireland	Ireland 3–10 (19); Scotland 4–7 (19)	Ratoath, Meath	Draw	
3	2005	October 8	Scotland	Scotland 4–8 (20); Ireland 2–11 (17)	Bught Park, Inverness	Scotland	
4	2006	November 9	(Republic of Ireland) Ireland	Scotland 2–13 (19); Ireland 2–5 (11)	Croke Park, Dublin	Scotland	
5	2007	October 13	Scotland	Scotland 4–10 (22); Ireland 0–11 (11)	An Aird, Fort William	Scotland	
6	2008	October 18	(Republic of Ireland) Ireland	Scotland 2–2 (8); Ireland 2–1 (7)	Nowlan Park, Kilkenny	Scotland	
7	2009	October 31	Scotland	Ireland 2–2 (8); Scotland 0–0 (0)	Bught Park, Inverness	(Republic of Ireland) Ireland	
8	2010	October 30	(Republic of Ireland) Ireland	Ireland 6–9 (27); Scotland 2–2 (8)	Ratoath, Meath	(Republic of Ireland) Ireland	
9	2012	October 28	(Republic of Ireland) Ireland	Clare 1–2 (5); Scotland 5–6 (21)	Fr. McNamara Park, Doora	Scotland	
10	2013	November 6	Scotland	Scotland 3–4 (13); Dublin 2–5 (11)	Bught Park, Inverness	Scotland	
11	2014	October 28	(Republic of Ireland) Ireland	Down 1–6 (9) Scotland 4–2 (14)	Páirc Esler, Newry	Scotland	
12	2015	October 24	Scotland	Scotland 5–4 (19); Kildare 0–1 (1)	Bught Park, Inverness	Scotland	
13	2016	October 22	Scotland	Scotland 0–2 (2); Dublin 3–3 (12)	Bught Park, Inverness	Dublin	
14	2025	October 25	Scotland	Ireland 5–3 (18); Scotland 2-0 (6)	Bught Park, Inverness	(Republic of Ireland) Ireland	
15	2026	October 24	(Republic of Ireland) Ireland	Ireland 9-11 (38) Scotland 1-3 (6)	Páirc Uí Chaoimh, Cork	(Republic of Ireland) Ireland	

== See also ==
- Composite rules shinty–hurling
  - Ireland national hurling team
  - Scotland national shinty team
- International Rules Series
- List of Shinty-Hurling international matches between Ireland and Scotland
