= List of hybrid sports =

Sport combining two or more other sports

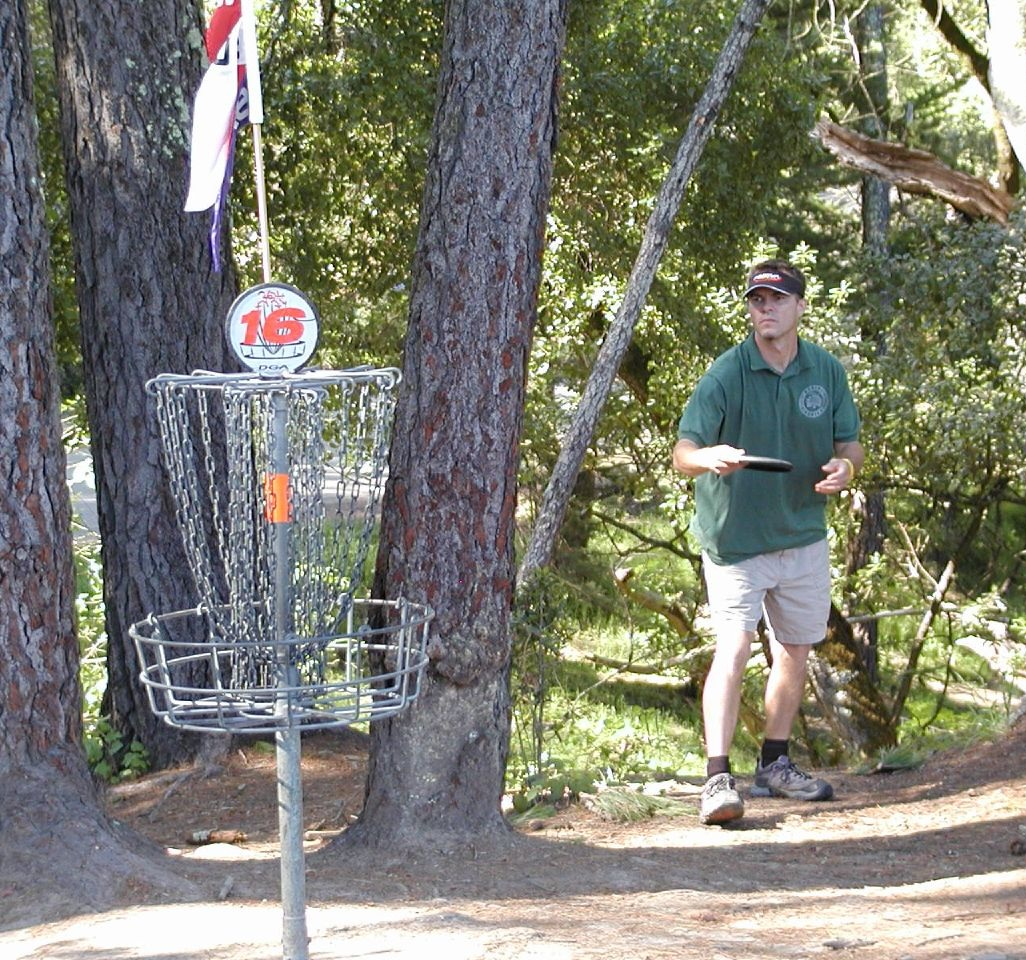
PDGA Amateur Desmond Knibbs playing disc golf, 2005.

A hybrid sport is one which combines two or more (often similar) sports in order to create a new sport, or to allow meaningful competition between players of those sports.

== List ==
B

- Ball in Play - a hybrid of baseball and cricket.
- Biathlon - a hybrid sport combining cross-country skiing and rifle shooting. Contestants ski through a cross-country trail system whose total distance is divided into either two or four shooting rounds.
- Bossaball – a hybrid sport combining elements of volleyball, association football, gymnastics and capoeira, played on a field with three bases. There is a trampoline at the third base along with a net. This sport allows players to bounce high to spike or touch the ball and touch it with any part of the body, especially arms and hands.

C

- Chess boxing – a hybrid sport which combines the sport of boxing with games of chess in alternating rounds. Chess boxing fights have been organized since early 2003. The sport was started when Dutch artist Iepe Rubingh, inspired by fictional descriptions of the sport in the writing of Enki Bilal, organized matches. The sport has become increasingly popular since then. To succeed players must be both skilled chess players and skilled boxers.
- Circle rules football – a hybrid of association football, volleyball, basketball, wrestling, and rugby, with a goal located on the center of circle field.
- Colpbol – a hybrid of handball and fistball.
- Composite rules shinty–hurling – the Irish sports of hurling or camogie combined with the Scottish sport of shinty.
- Cycle ball - a hybrid sport combined bicycle and futsal.

D

- Disc golf – a hybrid frisbee with elements of golf.
- Double disc court - a combined of frisbee and volleyball.
- Dart golf – a hybrid of darts and golf, played by throwing darts at a dartboard with golf-style stroke play scoring over nine or 18 "holes".

F

- Foobaskill – another hybrid of association football and basketball.
- Football tennis – a hybrid of association football and tennis.
- Footgolf – a hybrid of association football and golf.
- Footvolley – a hybrid of beach football, beach tennis and beach volleyball.
- Fullball — a hybrid of futsal, basketball and handball.

H

- Hybrid martial arts – a full contact individual combat sport which allowed to use the wide range of all aspects and techniques.

I

- International rules football – a combination of Gaelic football and Australian rules football. The International Rules Series, an annual series of two games between representative teams from Ireland and Australia, attracted sell-out crowds during its 2006 edition.

J

- Joggling - a hybrid of juggling and jogging.
- Jorkyball - a hybrid of Minifootball and Squash
- Jombola - a hybrid of table tennis, badminton, squash, tennis and pickleball.

K

- Kickball – a hybrid of association football and baseball.

L

- Leg cricket - a hybrid of association football and cricket.

M

- Modern pentathlon – an Olympic multisport that consists of five events: fencing (one-touch épée followed by direct elimination), freestyle swimming, obstacle course racing, laser pistol shooting, and cross country running.

P

- Padbol - a hybrid of soccer, volleyball, tennis and squash.
- Padel - a hybrid of tennis and squash.
- Phygital sport - a hybrid of simulation video game and field sport.
- Pickleball - a hybrid of ping-pong, tennis, and badminton.
- Polocrosse - a hybrid of polo and lacrosse, played on horseback.

R

- Racketlon - a combination in which competitors play a sequence of table tennis, badminton, squash and tennis.
- Roll ball – a unique combination of roller skating, basketball and handball, which is played under the handball rules.

S

- Samoa rules – a hybrid of rugby union and Australian rules football.
- Slamball - a full-contact team hybrid sports which will combine elements of basketball, American football, ice hockey, and acrobatics played on the basketball court, surrounded by hockey-style plexiglass walls, with two sets of four trampolines at the front of net and boards around the edges of the court.
- Sepak takraw - a hybrid of tennis ,association football and volleyball; an indoor version of footvolley.

T

- Tchoukball – a hybrid of volleyball, handball and squash.
- Tennis polo – a hybrid of tennis, handball, soccer and polo.
- Teqball – a hybrid of table tennis and soccer.

U

- Ultimate - a hybrid of frisbee and American football or rugby football.

V

- Volleyball - a hybrid of basketball and tennis.
- Vigoro – a hybrid of baseball, cricket and tennis.

W

- Wallyball - a hybrid of volleyball and squash.
- Water basketball – a hybrid of water polo and basketball.
- Water polo – a hybrid of swimming and handball.
- Whirlyball - a team sport that combines elements of basketball and jai alai with bumper cars.

== Inactive sports ==
- Austus – a combination of American football and Australian rules football played during the World War II, but this hybrid sport has not been recorded as having been played since.
- Boston game - a hybrid between association and rugby football, considered a milestone in the development of American football.
- Universal football – a combination of rugby league and Australian rules football trialed briefly in the early 20th century.
- Volata

== Gallery ==
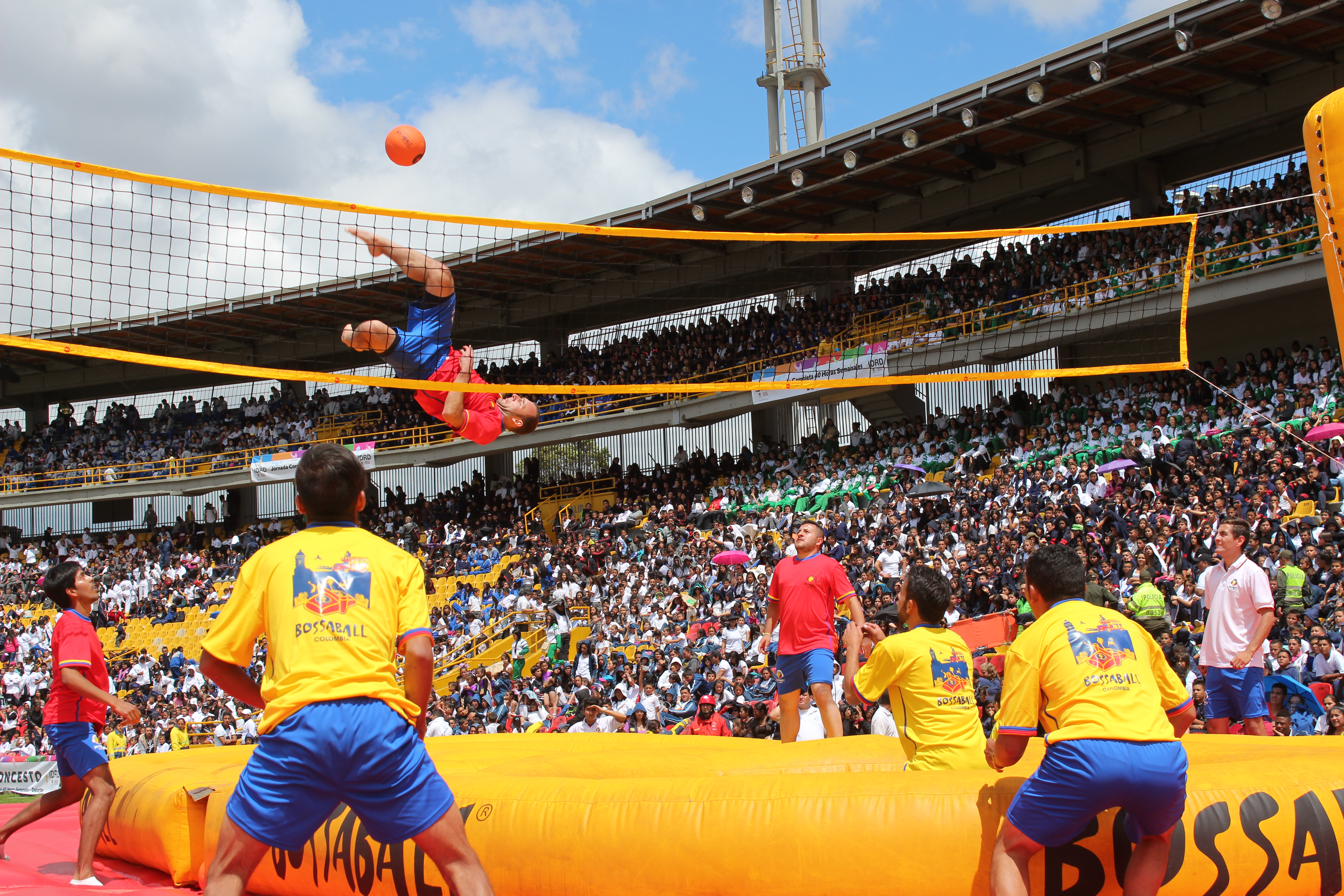
Bossaball

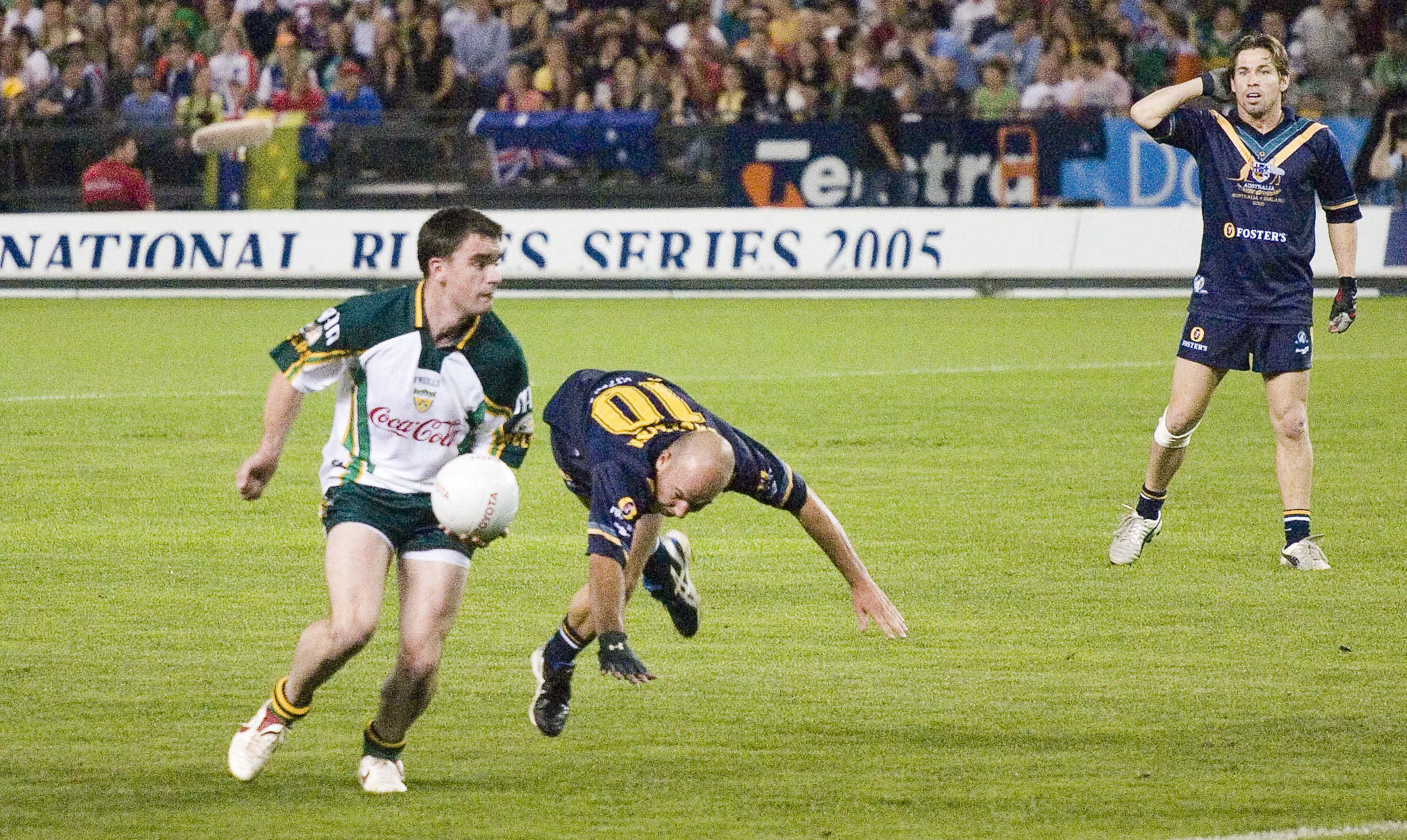
International rules football

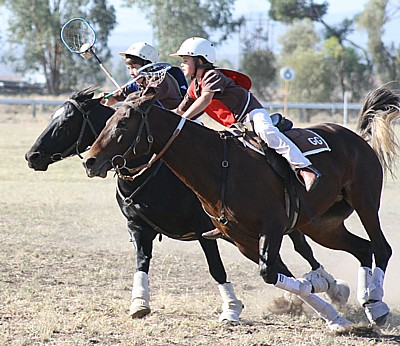
Polocrosse

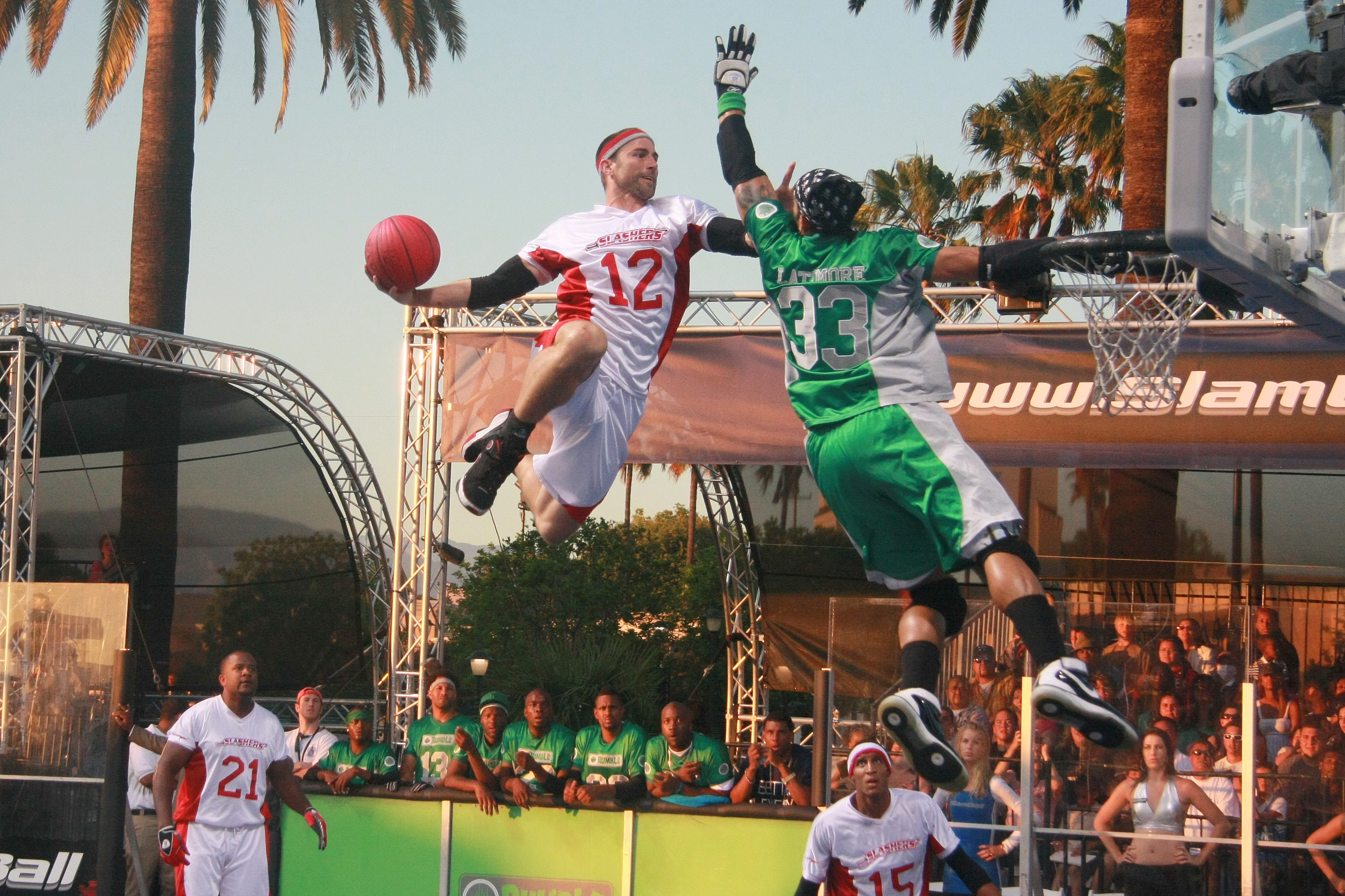
Slamball

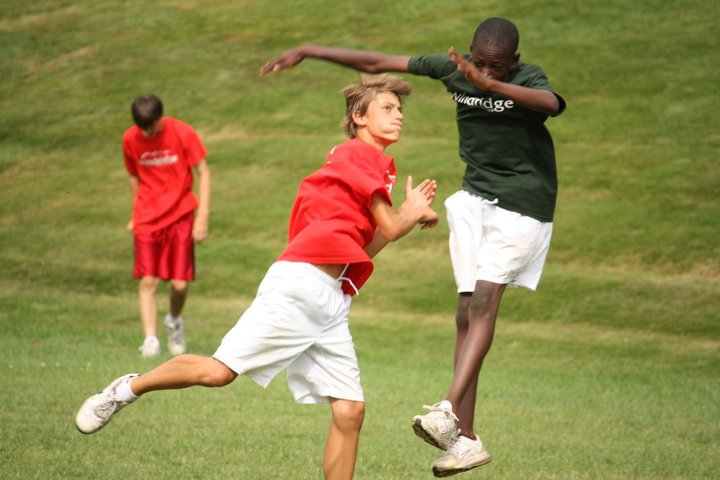
Tennis polo

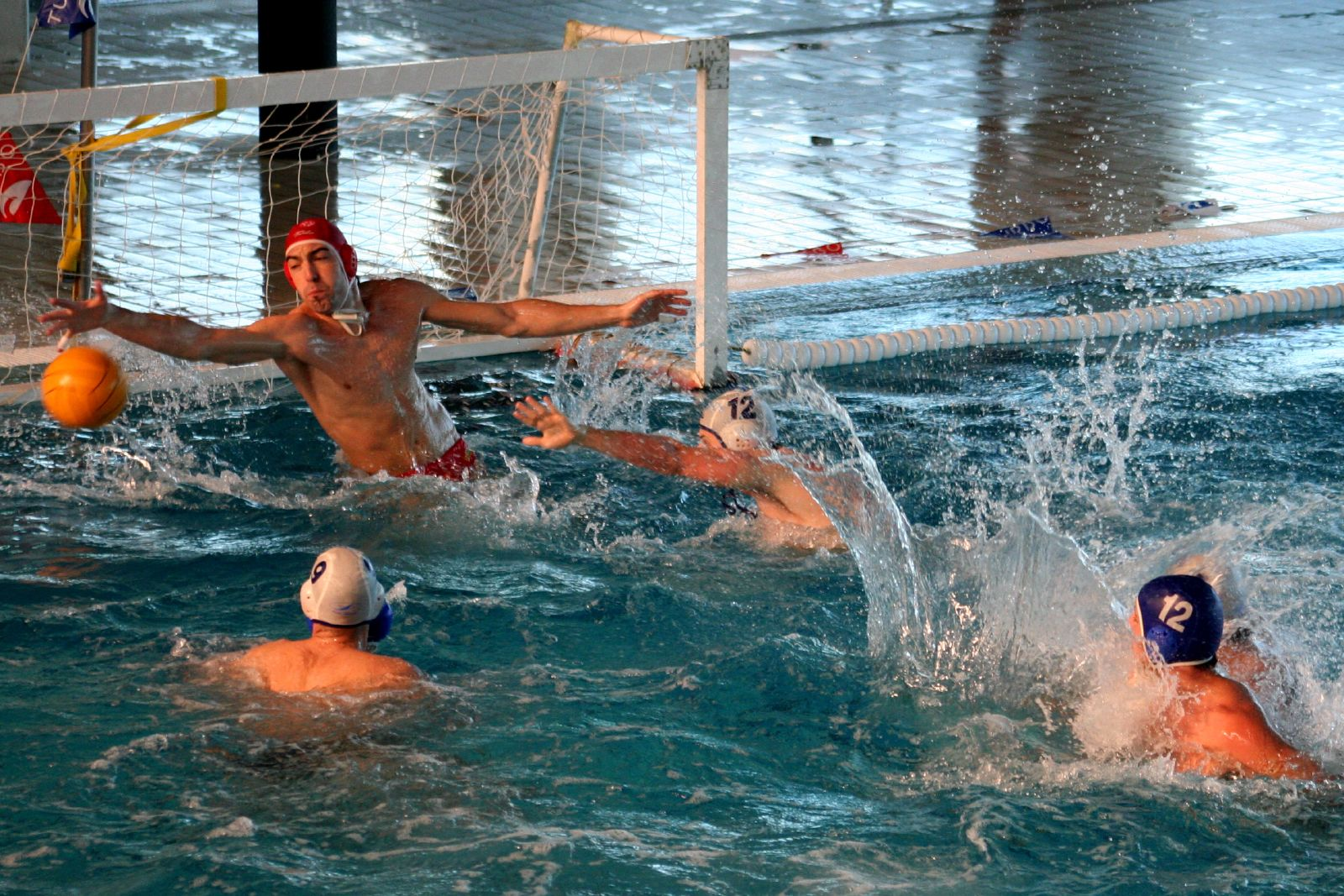
Water polo
