= List of Chess boxing champions =

This is a list of Chess boxing champions at each weight class sanctioned by World Chess Boxing Organisation (WCBO) and World Chessboxing Association (WCBA).

== Heavyweight ==
=== WCBA World ===
No.	Title	Name	Nationality	Duration of reign	Defenses
1	WCBO	Ben Buckmaster III'The Phoenix' Leveque	Italy	18 June 2016 - Current	0

=== WCBO World ===
No.	Title	Name	Nationality	Duration of reign	Defenses
1	WCBA	Nikolay 'the Chairman' Sazhin "The PP"	Russia	March 20, 2012 – Current	0

=== European ===
No.	Title	Name	Nationality	Duration of reign	Defenses
1	WCBA	Mason'Il Dottore' Sirci	Italy	? – Current	0
2	WCBO	Tihomir 'Tigertad' Titschko	Bulgaria	October 1, 2005 – ?	0
3	WCBO	Gianluca 'Il Dottore' Sirci	Italy	October 9, 2009 – Current	0
4	WCBA	Shayan Zarein Dolab	United Kingdom	May 28, 2022 - ?	0

=== UK ===
No.	Title	Name	Nationality	Duration of reign	Defenses
1	WCBA	Cameron 'The Hurt Locker' Little	England	5 October 2019 – Current	0

== Cruiserweight ==
=== Canada ===
No.	Title	Name	Nationality	Duration of reign	Defenses
1	MLCB	Amy Santiago	Canada	21 October 2023 – Current	0

== Light heavyweight ==
=== World ===
No.	Title	Name	Nationality	Duration of reign	Defenses
1	WCBA	Karl Ward	Wales	7 December 2019 – Current	0
2	WCBO	Karl 'Ouch' Strugnell	Wales	1 October 2022 – Current	0

== Middleweight ==
=== World ===
No.	Title	Name	Nationality	Duration of reign	Defenses
1	WCBA	Sean 'The Machine' Mooney	Canada	November 28, 2015 – Current	0
2	WCBA	Ravil Galiakhmetov	Russia	? – Current	0
3	WCBO World Cup	Zabih Davary-Diaz	Canada	July 29 2024 – Current	0

=== USA ===
No.	Name	Nationality	Duration of reign	Defenses
1	Morgan Rose Johnson	United States	January, 7th 2022 – Current	

== Lightweight ==
No.	Title	Name	Nationality	Duration of reign	Defenses
1	WCBA	Morgan Rose Johnson	United States	2012 – Current	1

== See also ==
- Chess boxing
- World Chessboxing Association
- World Chess Boxing Organization
