= Siberian Express (disambiguation) =

Siberian Express is a meteorological term in the United States.

Siberian Express may also refer to:

- Trans-Siberian Railway express train
- Siberian Express (horse), a racehorse
- Alexei Cherepanov (1989–2008), Russian hockey player
- Ivan Drago, a fictional character in the 1985 film Rocky IV
- Nikolay Sazhin (born 1988), Russian chess boxer
- Siberian Express (album), an album by jazz guitarist David Becker
