= Glasgow Cowal =

Defunct shinty team in Scotland

- Full name: Glasgow Cowal Shinty Club
- Gaelic name: Comann Camanachd Ghlaschu Chomhghail
- Founded: 1876
- League: defunct
- defunct
Home

Glasgow Cowal Shinty Club was a shinty club, founded in 1876 and now defunct, which was one of the founding members of the Camanachd Association. It was one of the most illustrious names in the sports history before folding in the 1920s. It played at various locations in Glasgow including Glasgow Green and was involved in some of the most important fixtures in shinty history.

== History ==
In keeping with many teams in Glasgow, the Cowal suffix indicated the area of the Highlands from which the club attracted its players originally, the Cowal Peninsula.

The club won the Glasgow Celtic Society Cup on four occasions and was captained by Alex McKellar when they won the first playing of that competition in 1879. Indeed, in 2004 the club was represented by four of McKellar's great-great-grandchildren at the 100th final of the competition.

In 1893, a game between Cowal and Kingussie was a major influence upon those who wished to formulise the rules of the game and to create a Camanachd Association.

Cowal also appeared in the first ever Camanachd Cup Final but were defeated 2–0 in Inverness by Kingussie. The club was renowned for its "scientific" approach to the game, which initially saw it have great success against teams from the Highland heartlands of the sport.

The club also took part in the first Composite rules shinty-hurling international to be played in Scotland at Celtic Park in 1897.

The club became defunct around 1934. It did not enter the Camanachd Cup in this season.
