= Scotland national shinty team =

National shinty team of Scotland

Scotland
- Union: Camanachd Association
- Ground(s): Bught Park, Inverness
- Coach: Alan MacRae
Team kit

First international
- Scotland 2-0 – 1-0 Ireland (Republic of Ireland) (Dublin, Ireland; 2 August 1924)

Largest win
- Scotland 5-11 – 0-4 Ireland (Republic of Ireland) (Abbotstown, Ireland; 2 November 2019)

Largest defeat
- (Republic of Ireland) Ireland 8-11 – 4-3 Scotland (Ennis, Ireland; 27 October 2012)

The Scotland national shinty team is the team selected to represent Scotland and the sport of shinty in the annual composite rules Shinty/Hurling International Series against the Ireland national hurling team. The team is selected by the Camanachd Association.

As well as the men's senior team currently headed by coach Alan MacRae, a men's under-21 team and women's team also competes against equivalent Irish sides each year, however these matches have not taken place since the 2020 pandemic. A men's under 17 team plays against Irish County select teams, which triumphed over Dublin and Wexford select sides in 2024.

After a hiatus, 2023 saw the return of the Shinty/Hurling international, with Roddy MacDonald captaining the side to a 0-22 to 2-08 loss in Newry, as Scotland conceded the Mowi Quiach for the first time since 2014. Robert Mabon was the 2024 captain as Ireland triumphed 3-16 to 5-7 at Cussack Park, Ennis, with Ireland equalising in the dying moments, before winning the tie in extra time.

== Match results ==
Date	Opponent	Venue	Result	Score
2 August 1924	(Republic of Ireland) Ireland	Croke Park, Dublin	Win	2-0 – 1-0
29 June 1932	(Republic of Ireland) Ireland	Croke Park, Dublin	Loss	1-0 – 6-0
5 August 1972	(Republic of Ireland) Ireland	Bught Park, Inverness	Loss	4-5 – 6-4

== Notable former players ==
- John Barr
- Gary Innes
- Stuart MacKintosh
- Niall MacPhee
- Finlay MacRae
- Ronald Ross
- Eddie Tembo
- Hector Whitelaw
