= Tim Woolgar =

British chess boxer

Tim Woolgar is a British chess boxer and event organiser who established Great Britain Chess Boxing Organisation and the London Chessboxing Club, the first United Kingdom chessboxing institution. He is the current president of the World Chessboxing Association. He is a former holder of the title, British Heavyweight Chess Boxing Champion. He also promotes chess boxing events.

Woolgar plans to come out of retirement to fight in London in December 2022.

Woolgar, otherwise known as "the Hippo" because of his rotund midsection has fought 12 times in Chessboxing with a record of 4-7-1.

== Biography ==
Woolgar formerly worked in the media as one of the UK's first video-journalists being one of the original recruits to Associated Media's TV news service Channel One London. Woolgar also worked as a video-journalist at the BBC's Science and Features department, an executive producer at ITV and as head of interactive programming at Endemol UK.

On 15 August 2008, Woolgar won 1st vacant title of British heavyweight championship by checkmate in 9th round against Exeter-based Stewart Telford.

On 24 April 2009, Woolgar competed in the world's first chess boxing match under amateur rules against Matthew Read, losing to a 7th round checkmate.

In October 2011, Woolgar was elected to the post of director of marketing of the English Chess Federation with 95 votes cast in his favour, 89 votes cast in favour of 'none of the above' and six abstentions. He served his entire term, but did not stand for re-election in 2012.

== Record ==
Professional Chess boxing record
5 Fights, 4 Wins (0 KOs, 3 CMs) 1 Loss
Date	Result	Opponent	Event	Location	Method	Round	Time
2010-10-16	Win	(Netherlands) Hubert "The Wardrobe" van Melick	"Beyond The Super-Dome"	Boston Dome, London, England	Check-mate	9	
2010-05-15	Win	(England) Nick Cornish	"Super-Dome 2"	Boston Dome, London, England	Check-mate	7	
2010-03-15	Loss	(Italy) Sergio Leveque	"Super-Dome"	Boston Dome, London, England	Check-mate	5	
2009-10-09	Win	(England) Matthew "Crazy Arms" Read	"Game of Kings"	Bethnal Green, London, England	Time Penalty	7	
2009-08-15	Win	(England) Stewart Telford	"An Exhibition of CHESSBOXING"	Bethnal Green, London, England	Check-mate	9	
Wins vacant 1st title of GBCBO British Heavyweight championship.
Legend: Win Loss Draw/No contest Notes

Amateur Chess boxing record
1 Fights, 1 Loss
Date	Result	Opponent	Event	Location	Method	Round	Time
2009-04-24	Loss	(England) Matthew "Crazy Arms" Read		London, England	Time Penalty	7	
Legend: Win Loss Draw/No contest Notes

Sporting positions
Preceded by N/A	1st GBCBO UK Heavyweight Champion; 15 August 2009 – ?	Succeeded by Andy 'the Rock' Costello
