= Niall MacPhee =

Niall MacPhee (born 19 September 1985) is a shinty player from Fort William, Scotland. He plays for Fort William Shinty Club.

== Playing career ==
MacPhee appeared in his first Camanachd Cup final at the age of 16 against Kingussie. He has featured in 7 finals in a row. He will be captain of Fort William in the 2010 final. He also won the Premier Division in 2006 for Fort William. He was also successful at University Shinty for Strathclyde University, winning the Littlejohn Vase on several occasions.

He is also a regular part of the Scotland national shinty team.

He is known as Rhino by the fans.

As shinty is an amateur sport, MacPhee works as a sports surface engineer based in Edinburgh and has carried out work for Uefa. MacPhee is a sports surface engineer based in Edinburgh and has carried out work for Sports Labs Ltd. He is an advocate of the use of synthetic surfaces in shinty.

He also designed a prototype caman for First Shinty which won a design award. MacPhee never heard back from the Camanachd Association and the project was never developed.
