= Schools Camanachd Association =

The Schools Camanachd Association (SCA) was the governing body for the sport of shinty at school level in Scotland. It was affiliated to the Camanachd Association but was an independent body. The SCA disbanded in 2015, with the Camanachd Association taking on responsibility for their competitions and remit.

== History ==
The Association was founded in 1937 to provide a competitive structure for schools in the sport.

In recent years the association has changed the format of some of its trophies and the MacBean Cup is no longer the Blue Riband event for whole school competition but has been reduced to an U13 9 a-side tournament.

There is also a South of Scotland Schools Camanachd Association which has emerged in recent years.

There is at present no SCA competition for pupils over the age of 16. This is major omission. The MacBean Cup was formerly the cup for whole school competition. The Sorley MacLean Quaich between Portree High School and Plockton High School is one competition that tries to fill the gap. The Homecoming Scottish Schools Challenge Shield was also created to fill this gap and is also not run by the SCA.

The Women's Camanachd Association also has started to run a regular schools competition which is not run under SCA jurisdiction due to differences in eligibility rules.

The SCA launched a website in November 2010 as well as increasing the combined roll total for schools to allow more combined teams to enter - one of the major criticisms of the Association.

The SCA disbanded in 2015 due to a lack of volunteers, with the Camanachd Association taking on responsibility for their competitions and remit.

== Primary School competitions ==
- MacKay Cup (National Primary School Championship)
- Tulloch Cup (National Primary School League Championship)

== Secondary School competitions ==
- MacBean Cup (National Under 13, 9-a-Side Championship)
- MacPherson Cup (National Under 14 Championship)
- Wade Cup (National Under 16 Championship)
- Donella Crawford Cup (Secondary girls sixes)
