= Iomain =

Hybrid team sport between shinty and hurling

Iomain was a hybrid sport formed from shinty and hurling created in 2013.

Iomain is a Gaelic word, meaning 'driving', and is one of the words traditionally used in Scotland to refer to shinty and Irish dialect to hurling.

It was argued that it might replace composite rules shinty–hurling in Scotland–Ireland internationals. Unlike composite rules, it was to use a single type of stick for both sides, and also one goal design.

The stick was made in the traditional shinty style with a much larger club face than in hurling but a longer shinty shaft. The goals used were shinty goals. It was designed also to be similar to the ground hurling that was once prevalent in Ireland, but has been superseded by the aerial variety.

Iomain was played at Croke Park in October 2013 in a demonstration game between Scotland and Ireland, with Scotland winning the match 5–0. Despite this, the initial test match at Croke Park was never repeated.
