= Chess boxing =

Hybrid game of chess and boxing

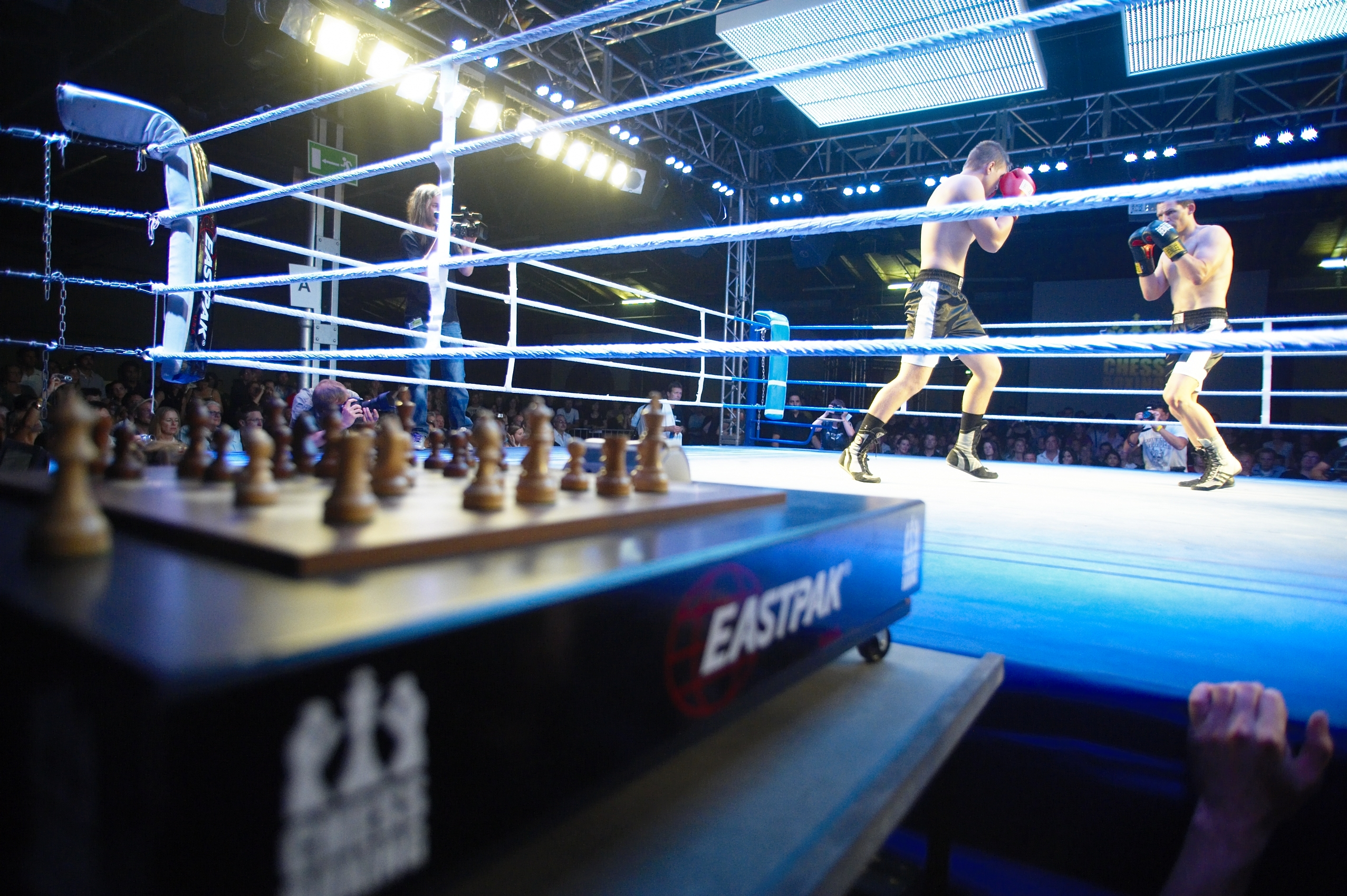
A chess boxing match in Berlin, 2008

Chess boxing, or chessboxing, is a hybrid sport that combines chess and boxing. Two combatants play alternating rounds of blitz chess and boxing until one wins by checkmate or knockout. It is also possible to win by time penalty as in normal chess, and by boxing decision if there is a draw in the chess round.

Typically, events are held in a standard boxing ring using standard amateur boxing equipment and rules. The chess round is also played in the ring with the table, board, and seating on a platform being lifted in and out of the ring from the ceiling for each round.

The governing bodies of chess boxing are the World Chess Boxing Association and the World Chess Boxing Organisation.

Chess boxing was invented by French comic book artist Enki Bilal and adapted by Dutch performance artist Iepe Rubingh as an art performance and has subsequently grown into a competitive sport. Chess boxing is particularly popular in the United Kingdom, India, Finland, France, and Russia.

== History ==
Alan Turing invented an earlier hybrid chess sport, referred to as "round-the-house chess", where one player makes a chess move, then that player runs around the house, and the other player must make a chess move before the first player returns.

An earlier version of combining chess and boxing took place in a boxing club outside London in the late 1970s. The Robinson brothers were in the habit of playing a round of chess against one another after a training session at their boxing club. The concept of chess boxing was first coined in the 1979 kung fu film The Mystery of Chess Boxing made by Joseph Kuo, where it referred to the Chinese variant of chess, xiangqi. In homage to the film of the same name, the band Wu-Tang Clan brought chess boxing into popular consciousness for the first time in 1993, when they released the song "Da Mystery of Chessboxin'".

The first chess boxing event was put on by Dutch performance artist Iepe Rubingh. Rubingh's idea to create a new sport fusing the two disciplines, chess and boxing, originates from the 1992 comic Froid Équateur, written by French comic book artist Enki Bilal, that portrays a chess boxing world championship. In the comic book version, however, the opponents fight an entire boxing match before they face each other in a game of chess. Finding this to be impractical, Rubingh developed the idea further until it turned into the competitive sport that chess boxing is today, with alternating rounds of chess and boxing and a detailed set of rules and regulations.

=== Early years ===
The first chess boxing competition took place in Berlin in 2003. That same year, the first world championship fight was held in Amsterdam, in cooperation with the Dutch Boxing Association as well as the Dutch Chess Federation and under the auspices of the World Chess Boxing Organization (WCBO) that had been founded in Berlin shortly before. Dutch middleweight fighters Iepe Rubingh and Jean Louis Veenstra faced each other in the ring. After his opponent exceeded the chess time limit, Rubingh won the fight in the eleventh round, going down in the history books as the first-ever World Chess Boxing Champion.

=== WCBA and WCBO ===
By 2012, Rubingh in Berlin and Tim Woolgar in London had become the two shining lights of the chess boxing scene. Rubingh's events tended to have a more serious tone, while Woolgar's brought a party atmosphere and larger crowds. These two champions of the new sport were unable to agree on forming a unified style, which eventually left the sport with two governing bodies: the World Chess Boxing Association (WCBA) and the WCBO. This period in chess boxing history was immortalised in the film By Rook or Left Hook – The Story of Chessboxing.

=== 2005–2008: First champions ===
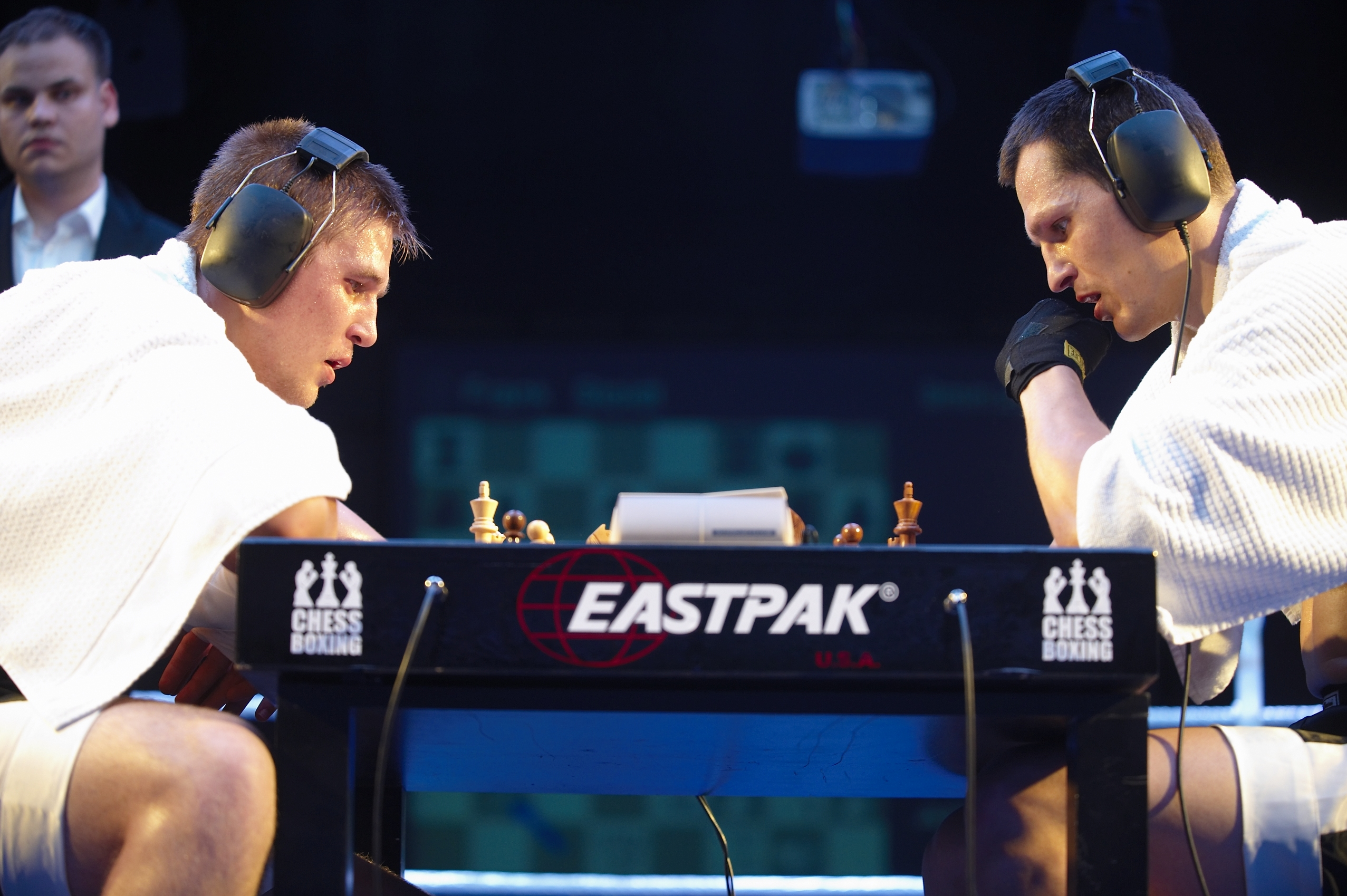
A chess round in a chess boxing match in 2008

The first European Chess Boxing Championship took place in Berlin on 1 October 2005. Present-day chess boxing commentator Andreas Dilschneider was defeated by Tihomir Dovramadjiev (FIDE Master) when he resigned in the ninth round of chess, crowning the latter by being the first European Chess Boxing Champion. A video report by German television channel RBB presented the event in detail. In 2006, more than 800 spectators filled the Gloria Theatre in Cologne for the world championship qualification fight between Zoran Mijatovic and Frank Stoldt. The 36-year-old Frank Stoldt, who was a former UN peacekeeper in Kosovo and Afghanistan, won when his opponent resigned in chess in the seventh round. After qualifying to fight for the title in 2006, Frank Stoldt went up against American David Depto in November 2007 in Berlin to fight for the first world championship title in the light heavyweight division. More than 800 tickets were sold for the event at the Tape Club in Berlin, making it the biggest chess boxing title fight to that date. Frank Stoldt defeated Depto in the seventh round and thereby cemented Berlin's status as the leading city in the chess boxing world and becoming the first German world champion.

=== 2008–2011: Growth ===
Chess boxing first received credit from the International Chess Federation FIDE, in April 2008; its president, Kirsan Ilyumzhinov, took part in a chess boxing demo fight in Elista. In 2008, chess boxing clubs were founded in London and Krasnoyarsk. Created in 2009, the Los Angeles Chessboxing Club was the first of its kind in the United States and was directly followed by the New York Chessboxing Club in 2010. The Boxer in Munich also opened in 2010 and offers chess boxing training. In addition to the WCBO's initially European and later world championships taking place, the scene at the London Chessboxing Club grew as well. In 2011, the first international club matchup took place, with Berlin and London in the ring.

=== 2011–2014: Global expansion ===
In 2011, the WCBO and with it, the global chess boxing community, made the biggest leap forward in its development to date with the foundation of the Chessboxing Organisation of India and its expansion in Asia, including Chessboxing China and the Chessboxing Organisation of Iran, which was founded in 2012. Furthermore, the third chess boxing organization in the United States, USA Chessboxing, was founded in 2011 and the European movement was being reinforced by the foundation of the Italian Chessboxing Federation in 2012. In addition to the WCBO becoming a registered association under German law in 2014, the Chess Boxing Global Marketing CBGM GmbH – called Chess Boxing Global (CBG) – was founded; it as of May 2013 is responsible for organizing all professional chess boxing fights worldwide and above all, for the organization of the Chess Boxing World Championships.

The Chess Boxing Organisation India was founded in 2011 by kickboxing official and former Indian kickboxing and karate champion Montu Das. With this, the growth of chess boxing in Asia gained momentum, with the first Chess Boxing Organisation in Western Asia already being built in the following year by another experienced official in the kickboxing world, Fereydoun Pouya, who started the Chess Boxing Organisation Iran.

At the same time, the process of making chess boxing a professional discipline reached a milestone: The 2013 World Championship in Moscow was the first chess boxing event organized and marketed by Chess Boxing Global. With three world championship fights in one night, more than 1,200 spectators, and a standard of fighting never seen before, the first CBG event set new standards in the history of chess boxing, with Leonid Chernobaev leading the way. He has been able to make a name for himself with more than fifteen years of chess-playing experience, and in the boxing world as Marco Huck's and Yoan Pablo Hernández's sparring partner, and having fought over 200 amateur bouts. He won the light heavyweight title against Indian fighter Shailesh Tripathi after a technical knockout in the eighth round (boxing). Sven Rooch secured his title in the middleweight class division—winning against Jonatan Rodriguez Vega after the Spaniard resigned in the seventh round (chess), and Russian Nikolay Sazhin won the heavyweight title against Gianluca Sirci by checkmate. Thus, Sazhin (heavyweight), Chernobaev (light heavyweight), and Rooch (middleweight) would all go down in chess boxing history as the first Chess Boxing Global World Champions.

In terms of its development into a mass sport, there was much success in 2013 and early 2014 for the chess boxing world. There were more competitors in the second and third Indian Championships in the summer of 2013 and early 2014 than in any chess boxing events ever before, with more than 245 fighters of varying age and weight class, taking place in Salem and Jodhpur, respectively. Furthermore, the chess boxing community in London—under the command of London Chessboxing and the WCBA—has continued to grow constantly since 2011 and by now stages chess boxing events for 800 or more spectators regularly four to five times a year at the Scala, King's Cross.

Late 2014 also saw the Finnish Chessboxing Club being founded in Helsinki by five members. Since 2013, there has also been a Moscow Chess Boxing club.

=== 2015–present ===
Chess boxing events in 2015 were produced by London Chessboxing under the WCBA—two events at Scala, Kings Cross. The second event, in June 2015, The Grandmaster Bash!, saw the British, European, and IBF light-welterweight world champion Terry Marsh fight and defeat Dymer Agasaryan. Terry Marsh is the first professional boxer to compete in chess boxing and has competed in three fights since June 2014 in London and still remains unbeaten in his career.

Chess boxing has also become more popular among young, poor women in India, where the sport has been seen as an alternative to traditional roles.

Actual numbers of local federations are officially registered in some countries, such as: China, Costa Rica, Czech Republic, Finland, France, Germany, United Kingdom, India, Iran, Italy, Madagascar, Mexico, Netherlands, Philippines, Russia, South Africa, Spain, Turkey, Ukraine, United States, and others.

In 2016, then-FIDE president, Kirsan Ilyumzhinov, publicly announced to Top Sport his desire to include chess boxing in the Olympic games.

On 11 December 2022, content creator and YouTuber Ludwig Ahgren held a chess boxing event, called the Mogul Chessboxing Championship, at the Galen Center in Los Angeles. The competition's bouts featured other content creators. The event's live viewership peaked at over 315,000 viewers on YouTube.

== Rules ==
A match consists of eleven alternating rounds of chess and boxing, starting and ending with chess (therefore, six chess rounds and five boxing rounds). The same game of chess is continued across rounds. Each round of chess or boxing lasts three minutes and is typically followed by a one-minute break. The chess rounds are played under time control, with a total of nine minutes allotted to each player and no increment added to either player's clock after a move is made.

=== Decisions ===
A chess boxing match can end by any of the following:

- Victory by knockout or technical knockout in boxing
- Victory by checkmate in chess
- Loss due to exceeding the chess game's time control; see fast chess
- Loss by resignation in either discipline
- Disqualification of one fighter by the referee in either discipline following multiple warnings (for extended inactivity, overextended playing time, rule infractions, etc.)
  - This rule prevents a fighter who is in an unwinnable position in one discipline from stalling to attempt to win in the other.

If the chess game ends in a draw before the final round, one more round of boxing is held. If this round also ends without a clear victory, the fighter who is ahead on boxing points wins the overall bout. If the chess draw occurs in the final round, the fighter ahead on points is immediately declared the winner. In either case, if the bout ends with both fighters tied on points, the one playing the black chess pieces wins the bout, due to not having the first-move advantage in chess. This scenario has not yet occurred in practice as of February 2025.

=== Weight classes ===
Like boxing, chessboxers are divided into weight classes. Currently, the following apply to professional chess boxing events of Chess Boxing Global (as of October 2014):

==== Men (17+ years) ====
- Lightweight: max. 70kg (154.3lbs)
- Middleweight: max. 80kg (176.4lbs)
- Light heavyweight: max. 90kg (198.4lbs)
- Heavyweight: over 90kg (198.4lbs)

==== Women (17+ years) ====
- Lightweight: max. 55kg (121.3lbs)
- Middleweight: max. 65kg (143.3lbs)
- Light heavyweight: max. 75kg (165.3lbs)
- Heavyweight: over 75kg (165.3lbs)

For amateur and youth chess boxing bouts under the flag of the WCBO, weight classes are graduated in 6-kilo steps. Exceptionally, event hosts can classify into 10-kilo steps.

== Particular requirements and training ==
A chessboxer must have strong skills in both chess and boxing to be permitted to compete in a professional chess boxing fight. The current minimum requirements to fight in a Chess Boxing Global event include an Elo rating of 1,600 and a record of at least fifty amateur bouts fought in boxing or another similar martial art. One deciding factor in chess boxing is that the fighters have to mainly train in speed chess; the skills required by speed chess are different from those for chess using classical time controls. However, chess boxing is not only the ability to master both sports but above all, to be able to withstand the constant switch from a full-contact sport to a thinking game, round after round. After three minutes of boxing, opponents have to face each other at the chessboard barely having taken a break, and have to then perform calmly and think tactically. This switch becomes increasingly hard for the athletes as the contest progresses.

To practice these skills, specialized chess boxing training is used, in which physical interval training forms are combined with blitz or speed chess games. Thereby, the fighters adopt the rhythm of a chess boxing bout. They will use exercises like "track chess" and "stair chess", in which training partners will play an 18-minute game of speed chess over six rounds, with intensive running exercises in between, such as 400-meter sprints or stair sprints. Other common methods of training combine speed chess games with strength exercises such as push-ups. The classic chess boxing training is box sparring combined with a game of speed chess.

== Major tournaments ==
Below is a partial list of chess boxing tournaments held in recent years:

#	Name	Date	Venue	Fights
1	CBN – St Patricks Day Bash 2023	25 March 2023	The Dome, London, England	5
2	CBP – Intellectual Fight Club 3	3 February 2023	Cabaret Sauvage, Paris, France	4
3	Mogul Chessboxing Championship	11 December 2022	Galen Center, Los Angeles, United States	7
4	CBN – Seasons Beatings 2022	10 December 2022	The Dome, London, England	4
5	WCBO – World Chessboxing Championships 2022	16 November 2022	Palmet Beach Resort Hotel, Antalya, Turkey	41
6	CBP – Intellectual Fight Club – Chessboxing Night	1 October 2022	Cabaret Sauvage, Paris, France	4
7	FISP International Chessboxing Show	3 June 2022	Piazza Ducale, Vigevano, Italy	4
8	CBN – Chessboxing Mayhem	28 May 2022	The Dome, London, England	4
9	FSHB Champion Belt of Russia	6 March 2022	Unknown venue, St Petersburg, Russia	1
10	Alpari Cup Chessboxing Tournament	10 February 2022	5 Element gym, Moscow, Russia	2
11	CB Iran – 6th National Chessboxing Championships	21 January 2022	Kish Island, Iran	0
12	CBN – Seasons Beatings 2021	11 December 2021	The Dome, London, England	4
13	CBOI – 4th Federation Cup, Jitendra Sharma Memorial	27 October 2021	Digha Sea Beach, West Bengal, India	0
14	CBCB – Schachboxen im Goldenen Haus	9 October 2021	Das Goldenen Haus, Germany	3
15	CBOI – National Ranking Chessboxing Tournament	3 October 2021	Digha Sea Beach, West Bengal, India	0
16	FCC – Nordic Chessboxing Fight Night	2 October 2021	Paasitorni Main Hall, Helsinki, Finland	4
17	First Lithuanian Open Chess Boxing Championship	21 August 2021	Geležinės pirštinės, Kaunas, Lithuania	4
18	CBOI – 9th National Chessboxing Championship 2021	17 August 2021	The Circle Club, Kolkata, India	0
19	CBOI – 9th West Bengal State Chessboxing Championship	7 February 2021	Das School of Martial Arts complex, Kolkata, India	0
20	LCB – 36 Clash of Kings 2020	14 March 2020	The Dome, London, England	4
21	Ignition Amsterdam	8 January 2020	Paradiso, Amsterdam, Netherlands	2
22	WCBO – World Chessboxing Championships 2019	15 December 2019	Palmet Beach Resort Hotel, Antalya, Turkey	43
23	LCB – Seasons Beatings 2019	7 December 2019	The Dome, London, England	5
24	CBP – Chessboxing Fights Paris #1	9 November 2019	Cabaret Sauvage, Paris, France	3

== Champions ==
Between 2003 and 2013, the chess boxing world championships were organized by the WCBO. As of 2013, they take the form of professional events under the auspices of Chess Boxing Global.

=== WCBA/WCBO (2003–2012) ===
==== World champions ====
- 2003: Iepe Rubingh Netherlands – middleweight, in Amsterdam against Jean Louis Veenstra Netherlands
- 2007: Frank Stoldt Germany – light heavyweight, in Berlin against David Depto United States
- 2008: Nikolay Sazhin Russia – light heavyweight, in Berlin against Frank Stoldt Germany
- 2009: Leo Kraft Germany – light heavyweight, in Krasnoyarsk against Nikolay Sazhin Russia
- 2012: Morgan Rose United States – lightweight, in Amsterdam against Río Cuomo Germany

==== European champions ====
- 2005: Tihomir Dovramadjiev Bulgaria – light heavyweight, in Berlin against Andreas Dilschneider Germany
- 2010: Gianluca Sirci Italy – heavyweight, in London against Andrew Costello United Kingdom
- 2015: Sergio Leveque Italy – heavyweight, in London against Darius Rolkis Lithuania
- 2015: Sergio Leveque Italy – heavyweight, in London against Dmitri Pechurin Russia
- 2016: Sergio Leveque Italy – heavyweight, in London against Daniel Wakeham United Kingdom

=== CBG (starting 2013) ===
- 2013: Nikolay Sazhin Russia – heavyweight, in Moscow against Gianluca Sirci Italy
- 2013: Leonid Chernobaev Belarus – light heavyweight, in Moscow against Shaliesh Tripathi India
- 2013: Sven Rooch Germany – middleweight, in Moscow against Jonathan Rodriguez Vega Spain

== Major organizations ==
=== World Chess Boxing Association ===
The World Chess Boxing Association (WCBA) is a legally recognized umbrella organization for chess boxing. It was founded in 2013 and is based in London, England. English heavyweight chess boxing champion Tim Woolgar is its current president. The WCBA originated from the London Chessboxing Club after having separated from the WCBO. It was founded by Woolgar in 2013 to accelerate the development of chess boxing. WCBO champions are also managed and recognized by the WCBA.

=== World Chess Boxing Organisation ===
The World Chess Boxing Organisation (WCBO) is the leading umbrella organization for international amateur chess boxing. It is based in Berlin, Germany, and legally recognized as a nonprofit organization by the German government. Iepe Rubingh founded the WCBO directly after the first chess boxing fight in 2003. Its goal is to establish the WCBO as the worldwide organization for the sport of chess boxing. The WCBO aims to collect and link all active chess boxing clubs worldwide under one roof. It was legally recognized as a registered association by Berlin's district court in 2014. The WCBO was the official organizer of the chess boxing world championships until it recognized Chess Boxing Global, following its statute, as the exclusive marketing agent for professional chess boxing fights, in 2013. Chess boxing inventor and WCBO founder Iepe Rubingh is also the current chairman. The first honorary member is comic book artist Enki Bilal, whose comic inspired the invention of chess boxing.

==== WCBO member associations ====
- Chess Boxing Club Berlin (CBCB)
- Chess Boxing Organisation of India (CBOI)
- Chess Boxing Organisation of Iran (CBOIR)
- Italian Chess Boxing Federation (FISP)
- China Chessboxing (CBCN)
- Russian Chess Boxing Organisation

=== Chessboxing Nation ===
London Chessboxing is a brand under which the sport of chess boxing has been promoted since 2008 in London, England. Although the sport has been practised in London since 1978, the home of chess boxing in London today is Islington Boxing Club, where London Chessboxing hosts regular training sessions.

The first-ever chess boxing event hosted in the UK under the brand was at Bethnal Green Working Men's club in Hackney by Tim Woolgar on 15 August 2008. Other notable venues include Chelsea Old Town Hall, The Grange Hotel in St Pauls, and the Royal Albert Hall. Their events are hosted at Scala, King's Cross, York Hall, and The Dome, in Tuffnell Park. The events are also broadcast on the livestreaming service Twitch.

In 2021 London Chessboxing rebranded as Chessboxing Nation in order to compete with Chessboxing Global; however, Chessboxing Global collapsed following the death of Iepe Rubingh.

== Documentary ==
In July 2021, a documentary titled By Rook or Left Hook – The Story of Chessboxing premiered at the Doc Edge documentary festival in New Zealand, to positive reviews. The film was produced and directed by Canadian filmmaker David Bitton and executive-produced by Ed Cunningham, producer of the gaming documentary The King of Kong. By Rook or Left Hook tracks the early years of chess boxing, primarily focusing on the tensions that formed between the sport's inventor, Iepe Rubingh, and London Chessboxing founder, Tim Woolgar, and the formation of the two rival governing bodies, the WCBO and the WCBA. Although the documentary was filmed over an eight-year period, (November 2010 to January 2018), the story spans over 21 years—from Rubingh's early years as an artist, all the way up to his death in May 2020.

== Chess boxing and science ==
In parallel with the development of chess boxing as a sport, the discipline has found an increasing place in several works by leading scientists who study the potential application of the concept in various fields.

- The concept of chess boxing is of great interest to science seeking to optimize and increase the physical and psychological characteristics of athletes through the application of new methods and approaches, in order to increase human strength, biomechanical and intellectual abilities, and others.
- The concept of the sport of chess boxing occupies a leading place in the research of scientists looking for new integrated methods and approaches applicable in the educational process to improve the general condition of adolescents, young people, and disadvantaged individuals.
- In general, the main conclusions show the positive impact of the diversity of the sport of chess boxing, characterized by certain dynamics in a diverse environment.

== Chess boxing and mass media ==
- In 2012, Judit, Susan, and Sofia Polgar hosted a chess festival in Hungary during which the WBF / IBO middleweight world boxing champion Mihaly Kotai played a chess boxing match, the first in Hungary.
- In 2013, the information and educational television channel Moscow 24 presented a report on the popularity of chess boxing.
- In 2018, the official promo video SHAHBOX PROMO was presented. The video shows the preparation of the Russian national chess team for an international tournament in Moscow (28 March 2018) under the auspices of the Chess Federation (Moscow, Russia) and the World Chess Federation (WCBO). The tournament was held and supported by the Ministry of Sports of the Russian Federation. Among the participants in the cup were five candidates for master of sports in boxing, two masters of sports in kickboxing, one professional boxer (with a score of 3 – 0), two masters, three candidates for master of chess, three world champions in chess boxing, one European champion, and one silver medalist from the World Chess Championship.
- In 2019, the book Chessboxer by Stephen Davies was published.
- In 2019, the St. Petersburg TV channel presented a report on how chess boxing attracts chess players and boxers.
- In 2019, Red Bull TV officially presented a documentary on chess boxing.
- In 2020, at an international chess boxing tournament held in the Netherlands, K1 multiple world kickboxing champion Remy Bonjasky supported the event as a commentator. The tournament was especially important because after seventeen years, chess boxing returned to the country where the first world championship was held.
- In early 2021, Russian channel RT publicly promoted chess boxing in a presentation video, focusing attention on the sport's popularity around the world and its prospects for inclusion in the Olympic Games.
- On 11 December 2022, YouTube personality Ludwig Ahgren hosted a chess boxing competition called Mogul Chessboxing, featuring other YouTube and Twitch celebrities, as well as Super Smash Bros players and chess grandmasters. The stream peaked at 317k viewers, making it the largest premier of chess boxing in the history of the sport.

== See also ==
- List of Chess boxing champions
