= Tihomir Dovramadjiev =

Bulgarian chess boxer (born 1979)

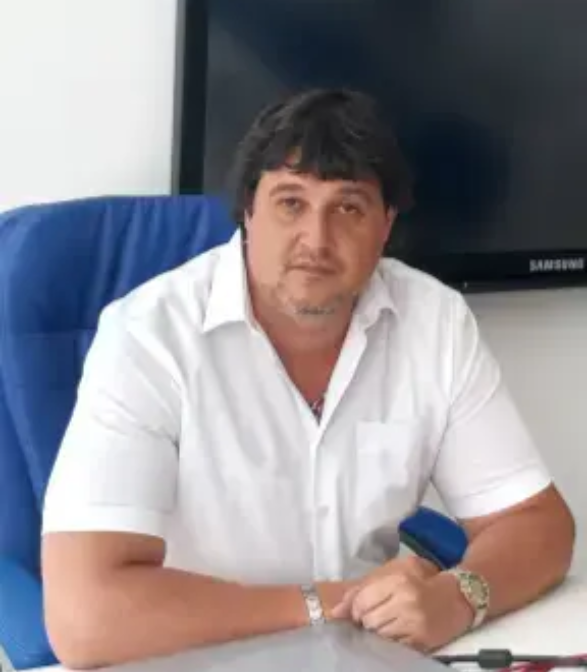
- Photo of Tihomir Dovramadjiev from the CEEPUS Ergonomics and Human Factors international meeting, held at the Technical University – Varna, Bulgaria, on 16 August 2021

Personal information
- Full name: Tihomir Atanassov Dovramadjiev
- Born: May 22, 1979 (age 47) Varna, Bulgaria

Chess career
- Country: Bulgaria
- Title: FIDE Master (2004)
- Peak rating: 2356 (January 2011)
Medal record
1st European Chessboxing Championship (1 October 2005, Berlin, Germany) https://www.eurosport.com/boxing/world-news/2005/checkmate-meets-ko-ne._sto782958/story.shtml

Tihomir Atanassov Dovramadjiev (Bulgarian: Тихомир Атанасов Доврамаджиев; born 22 May 1979), also known as Tihomir Tishko ("Tishko" being a short form of "Tihomir") and as TigerTAD on the Playchess server, is a Bulgarian chess FIDE master and chess boxer. He became the first European chess boxing champion from Berlin, Germany, in 2005. with both World Chess Boxing Organisation - WCBO and World Chess Boxing Association - WCBA acknowledgments. He has held the International Chess Federation - FIDE title of FIDE master since 2004. Currently, he holds the position of associate professor in the Department of Industrial Design at the Technical University of Varna.

== Early years and sport activity ==
Before taking up chess boxing, Dovramadjiev won the Bulgarian national chess championship in his age group multiple times and has played in international chess tournaments.

He was the national youth chess champion of Bulgaria in 1991 (classic), 1993 (classic), 1997 (blitz), and 1998 (classic). He was a member of the youth team of the Bulgarian National Chess Team, together with the world chess champions GM Veselin Topalov and GM Antoaneta Stefanova. He also participated in a number of European and world youth championships, 5th place at the 1991 European Championship in Mamaia, Romania; 3rd–4th place at the 1991 World Championship in Warsaw, Poland; and 2nd-3rd place at the 1993 European Rapid Chess Championship in Paris, France.

In 2001 and 2008, he won the chess section of the Varna Sport Universiade. In 1997, he was on the 1st place Kaissa team from Varna at the youth team championship in Plovdiv. He continued to compete on teams from Varna, as well as on the Lokomotiv team from Plovdiv, Bulgaria. He then played in the German team league, where he competed for SV Nashuatec of Berlin, Germany, which won the German Landesliga for the 2003–2004 season, defeating the Gillette team in the decisive match. For the Nashuatec team, he recorded a result of 22 wins, 2 draws, and 0 defeats.

He has successfully participated in a number of online championships, repeatedly ranking among the top three in tournaments held by ChessBase / Playchess Germany. As of November 2011, his FIDE Elo rating is 2356. In May 2026, he achieved 100 tournament victories on the Chess.com website.

Landesliga 2003–2004 Season
		Points	Board Points	Games	Wins	Draws	Losses
1	SV Nashuatec 1	18	25.5 : 16.5	7	6	0	1
2	SK Gillette 1	14	25.5 : 16.5	7	4	2	1
3	BA Tempelhof	10	21.5 : 20.5	7	2	4	1
4	SG Wiheil 1	10	20.5 : 21.5	7	2	4	1
5	SG Bund 1	8	22.5 : 19.5	7	1	5	1
6	SG Schering 1	8	21.5 : 20.5	7	2	2	3
7	SV Senat 1	7	19 : 23	7	2	1	4
8	ACCSB/ZIB 1	7	18.5 : 23.5	7	1	4	2
9	SEL/Alcatel 1	6	19 : 23	7	2	0	5
10	B. Bank 1	4	16.5 : 25.5	7	0	4	3

== Chess boxing ==
In 2003, Titschko was invited by the World Chess Boxing Organisation (WCBO) to participate in their tournaments. In October 2005, he won the first European Chess Boxing Championship by defeating Andreas Schneider (Germany) in the final event. The event was covered by a number of international media, such as Eurosport, Sports Illustrated, CNN, the Los Angeles Times, Die WELT, ChessBase, and others. A detailed video report was presented on the German television channel RBB Fernsehen.

== Academic career ==
Along with his sports activities in the first decade of the 21st century, Titschko has continued his career in academia. from 2002 to 2006, at the Technical University of Varna, Bulgaria (TU-Varna), he earned a master's degree in ergonomics and industrial design. In 2007–2009, he earned a master's in social and legal sciences, criminology, and social prevention. From 2009 to 2012 he was a full-time doctoral student at TU-Varna. He successfully defended his doctoral thesis: "Creating a design of osseointegrated dental implants" and received a PhD in 2012. The official state data is available on the website of Bulgarian National Centre for Information and Documentation. During his doctoral studies, he also taught as a lecturer. In 2012, he became an assistant professor at TU-Varna, in the Department of Industrial Design.

In 2018, after winning a government-sponsored competition, he held the academic position of associate professor at TU-Varna. he has taught for the university, mentoring undergraduate and graduate students, and participating in research projects. As of 2021, according to ResearchGate, his scientific publications have over 300K views. In 2020, as a coordinator for TU-Varna, with his international colleagues from nine partner countries, he participated in the creation of the Ergonomics and Human Factors Regional Educational CEEPUS Network.

As of 2021, he is on the editorial board of the IETI Transactions on Ergonomics and Safety (TES, ISSN 2520-5439) and IETI Transactions on Engineering Research and Practice (TERP, ISSN 2616-1699) of the International Engineering and Technology Institute. He participated in the 16th International Symposium in Management Management, Innovation and Entrepreneurship in Challenging Global Times. He is an academic member and special issue editor of MDPI Mathematics (ISSN 2227-7390; Journal Rank: JCR - Q1 (Mathematics; ) / CiteScore - Q1 (General Mathematics); Impact Factor: 2.592 (2021); 5-Year Impact Factor: 2.542 (2021)) Special Issue "Mathematics and Computer Programming in 2D and 3D Open Source Software". He has acted as chairman, author, and reviewer of the Applied Human Factors and Ergonomics (AHFE) conference, the International Conference on Human Systems Engineering and Design (IHSED), the Intelligent Human Systems Integration (IHSI) conference, the International Conference on Human Interaction and Emerging Technologies (IHIET), the International Symposium in Management (SIM), and other international science conferences and congresses.

He is a co-author of the international team Taylor & Francis Group books (September 5, 2023, by CRC Press) "NEW PERSPECTIVES IN BEHAVIORAL CYBERSECURITY" Human Behavior and Decision-Making Models, ISBN 9781032414775. The world partnership: USA (General Coordinator), Bulgaria, Estonia, Canada, United Arab Emirates, Cameroon and the Philippines and book "NEW PERSPECTIVES IN BEHAVIORAL CYBERSECURITY II" Human Behavior for Business, Profiling, Linguistics and Voting, ISBN 978-1-032-98352-3.

Since 2021, he has been the President of the Bulgarian Association of Ergonomics and Human Factors (BAEHF), which is affiliated and a member of the International Ergonomics Association (IEA) and Federation of the European Ergonomics Societies (FEES).

On 21 May 2026 Professor Assoc. Dr. Eng. Tihomir Dovramadjiev was honored with the prestigious Varna Award 2026 in the category “Technical Sciences,” receiving the individual distinction for his own Taylor & Francis Group book "3D Digital Design in Ergonomics and Human Factors" ISBN 978-1-032-50315-8 and for his significant contributions to scientific progress, education, and societal development; the nomination was submitted by the Technical University of Varna, Bulgaria, and the award was presented during the official Varna Award Ceremony by Mayor Blagomir Kotsev and Municipal Council Chairman Hristo Dimitrov in the presence of leading representatives from the cultural and educational sectors.
