= Iepe Rubingh =

Dutch chess boxer

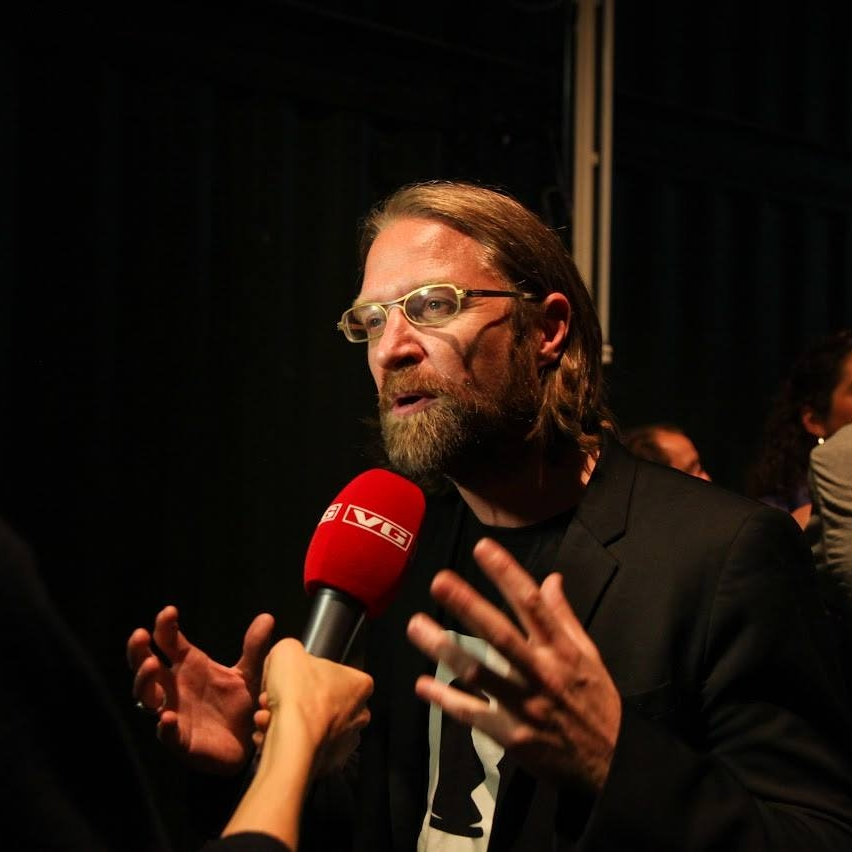
- Rubingh in 2015
- Born: Iepe B. T. Rubingh; 17 August 1974; Rotterdam, Netherlands
- Died: 8 May 2020 (aged 45)
- Occupation: Chess boxer

Iepe B. T. Rubingh (Dutch pronunciation: [ˈipə ˈrybɪŋ]; 17 August 1974 – 8 May 2020) was a Dutch performance artist, athlete and the founder of chess boxing and World Chess Boxing Organisation (WCBO, with central Berlin, Germany in 2003).

== Biography ==
=== Works as an artist ===
As a performance artist, Rubingh blocked off intersections in Berlin and Tokyo (Shibuya Crossing) to create major traffic congestion. He was jailed for 10 days for the Tokyo action.

In 2010 (Sunday April), 500 litres of waterbased environmentally-friendly paint on asphalt spread by 2000 cars on Rosenthaler Platz Berlin. By IEPE & the anonymous crew. Directed by AKIZ.

=== Chess boxing ===
Rubingh founded chess boxing in 2003, drawing inspiration from Enki Bilal's comic book Froid Équateur. He was the President of the World Chess Boxing Organisation (WCBO) for many years and CEO of Chess Boxing Global, the marketing company for professional chessboxing.

Rubingh is recorded in the Guinness World Records as the First Chess Boxing World Champion.

=== The Queen's Gambit ===
The popular Netflix miniseries "The Queen's Gambit" is dedicated to Rubingh. He is credited as an "On-Set Chess Consultant" for the series.

=== Death ===
Rubingh died in his sleep on 8 May 2020. The cause of death was not determined, although COVID-19 was excluded.

== Record ==
Chess boxing record
3 Fights, 3 wins (1 TOs, 2CMs)
Date	Result	Opponent	Event	Location	Method	Round	Time
2010-11-06	Win	(Germany) Tim "Bavarian Beast" Yilmaz	Festsaal Kreuzberg	Berlin, Germany	Check Mate	7	
Wins vacant 1st title of International German middleweight championship.
2004-04-17	Win	(Japan) Soichiro "The Cho-Yabai" Yanase	The Tokyo Fight	Meguro, Tokyo, Japan	Check Mate	9	
2003-11-14	Win	(Netherlands) Luis "The Lawyer" Veenstra	1st Chess Boxing World Championship	Paradiso, Amsterdam, Netherlands	Time Out	11	
Wins vacant 1st title of WCBO world middleweight championship.
Legend: Win Loss Draw/No contest Notes

== Titles ==
- 1st World Chess Boxing Organization World Middleweight champion (2003 – Current)
- 1st Chess Boxing Club Berlins International German middleweight champion

Sporting positions
Preceded by N/A	1st WCBO World Middleweight Champion; November 14, 2003 – Current	Succeeded by N/A
Preceded by N/A	1st CBCB International German Middleweight Champion; November 6, 2010 – Current	Succeeded by N/A
