= Colpbol =

Team sport invented in 2014

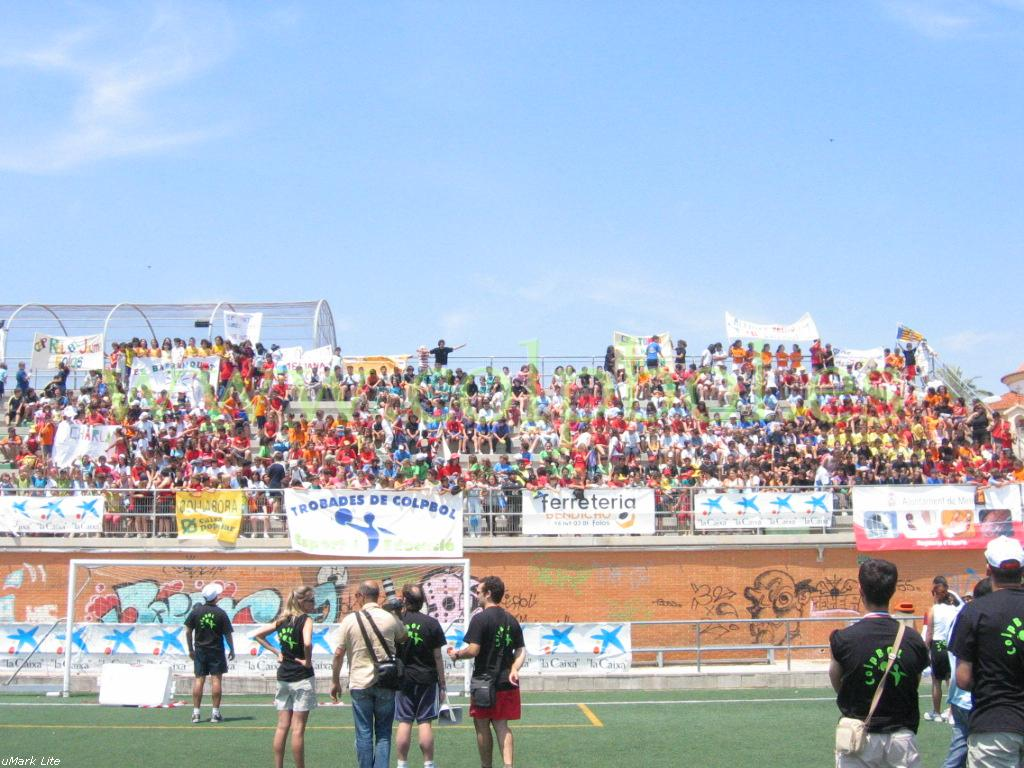

Colpbol is a team sport invented in 1997 by Valencian physical education teacher Juanjo Bendicho. Colpbol is characterized by its great dynamism, integration and egalitarianism, with all team members having equal importance, and with mixed gender teams the rule rather than the exception.

In this sport, players can only touch the ball once, and only with the same person. They can't touch with the feet and can't take the ball with two hands.

Colpbol has spread from Valencia to the rest of Spain and to some countries in South America. There is a youth Colpbol league in Spain with more than 30000 participants.
