= Foobaskill =

Foobaskill (stylised as FooBaSKILL) is a hybrid of football and basketball developed by three physical education teachers from Switzerland in 2015. It puts into practice the attributes of soccer and basketball. The game is designed to improve coordination, creativity and general football and basketball skills.

== History ==
After recognizing deficits in the area of coordination with their students, in 2015 three P.E. teachers from Lausanne decided to create youth sport camps. The main goal of the National Sports Camp is to develop the children's coordination during its golden age (5 to 13 years).

During the first edition in 2015, the idea of creating a game that would characterize the camp and its main concern, developing the youth's everyday skills, arose.

The game mixes soccer and basketball. The ways of scoring points have been adapted to give the opportunity to all participants helping the team win, work on the lower body and upper body, but also to unconsciously working on their rebounding skills in basketball and scoring in soccer.

Foobaskill became an official sport of the Swiss Armed Forces, beginning in January 2018. The standing orders "Sport in der Armee Stoffprogramme Anhang 6 zum Regl 51.041 dfi" specifies Foobaskill's use during officers school, NCO course and the annual repetition course.

The Swiss Federal Office of Sport published in December 2017 a pedagogical manual for PE teachers and coaches. Foobaskill became an official sport in the Swiss physical education system.

== Basic rules ==
The specificity of Foobaskill lies in the interchange of lower body (soccer) and upper body (basketball) work. Players change discipline at the midline of the playing field. Half of the pitch is equipped with two soccer goals, consisting of two upper parts of a gymnastic box with a cone or the Foobaskill goal on top. In the other half is a basketball hoop. The back and side walls are an integral part of the playing field, so players can use them to bounce the ball against. Two teams of four players face each other. During the first half, a team defends the soccer goals and attacks the basketball hoop. Then in the second half, the teams reverse the roles. The basic rules are identical to those of soccer and basketball.
