= Tennis polo =

Field sport

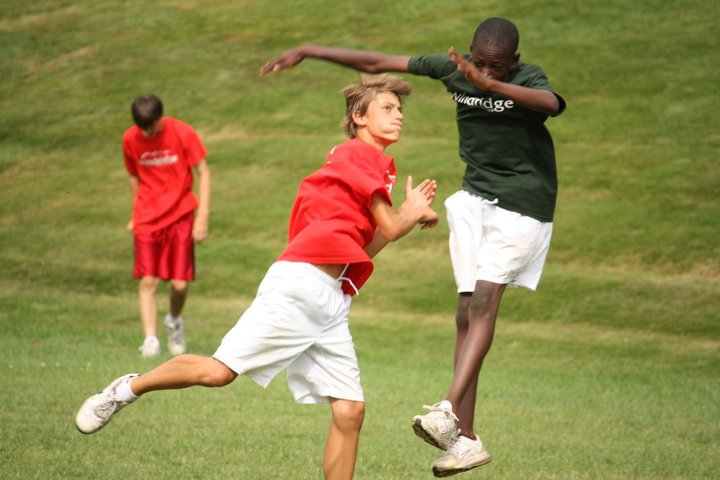
- A player throws the ball, while being defended during a tennis polo match
- Highest governing body: Tennis Polo Association
- First played: Lakeside, CT, USA (2004)

Characteristics
- Team members: 2 teams of 10

Tennis polo (or toccer) is a field sport where two teams of ten players (nine field players and one goalkeeper) use a tennis ball to score goals by throwing the ball into a goal defended by a keeper who holds a racket. Tennis polo shares elements of sports such as field handball, hurling, football, and lacrosse. The game may also be played where all field players have rackets including the goalkeeper.

The sport is interchangeably referred to as "tennis polo" or "toccer". There are players in 18 countries including Canada, Mexico, United States, Italy, and France.

Adapted to be a fast-paced sport with little stoppage of play, players advance the ball by throwing or kicking within the field of play.

== Create ==
Tennis polo or toccer is a team sport played with a racket and ball similar to tennis. This athletic discipline was created by the American Ron Bronson in 2002. In 2004 a variant of this sport called viperball was regulated and is played indoors.

== Equipment ==
Tennis polo goalkeepers use rackets similar to those used in tennis. Only goalkeepers are allowed racquets, and while any player can serve as goalkeeper, no player acting as goalkeeper can leave the 11-yard box with a racquet.

== Field of play ==
Field of play in tennis polo

The sport is played on a grass field between 80 and 100 yards long and 50 to 65 yards wide. The goal area is a semicircular line with an 11-yard radius and the penalty mark at 13 yards from the goal. An experimental rule has a second semicircular line on the field with a 17-yard radius. Generally, a field for gridiron football or soccer can be used.

== Length of a match ==
The match length is variable, but sanctioned matches are divided into two halves of 20 minutes. If matches are tied, an extra 20-minute period is played. If the score remains tied at the end of a tournament match, the game is decided by throws from the penalty mark (13 yards from the goal), but players are allowed to run anywhere between the midfield line and penalty mark before throwing the ball and have five seconds in which to take their shot.

== Game play ==
Each half of the game begins with a jump ball by a referee at midfield.

The ball can be advanced by throwing it or kicking it. When a player has the ball in their possession, they can run with it for up to three steps (or five seconds) before being required to either pass it or attempt a shot on goal.

Offensive players cannot attempt shots on goal from within the penalty area (referred to as the "layer") and any goals scored from within the layer are invalid. Defensive players may defend from within the layer, as well as the racket keeper.

=== Substitutions ===
Teams make unlimited substitutions and substitutes enter play without stoppage of play (as in ice hockey and some varieties of indoor soccer).

=== Turnovers ===
When the ball is turned over because it goes out of bounds, the clock is not stopped. Instead, the ball is retrieved (or in most cases, a new ball given to the opposing player) and the game resumes. If the ball is intentionally thrown out of bounds, it is referred to as wasting and the penalized team is assessed a penalty depending on the severity, which may include extended time at the discretion of the referee.

=== Player positions ===
The standard 10-team formation consists of two layer defenders, one strong back, a deep wing, one middle receiver, three strikers and a goalkeeper. Some teams opt for different variations of player formations, but no more than 10 players (including a goalkeeper) are allowed on the field at a time.

=== Penalties ===
Most games are officiated by a head referee and two umpires at each end of the field. Players are assessed penalties for infractions such as holding, carrying the ball too long without passing or attempting a shot on goal, interference or goal keepers running outside of the layer with the racket in-hand.

== Scoring ==
Scoring occurs when the ball is hit (or kicked) into the goal. Each goal is worth one point. Goals scored outside of the 17-yard arc are worth two points and those scored in front of the 13-yard arc are worth one point.

Offensive players are not allowed to be in front of the ball in order for two-point goals to count. The team with the most points at the end of the game wins the match.

== History ==
In 2004, the Tennis Director at Camp Awosting in Lakeside, Connecticut, Ron Bronson, created the sport of toccer as a diversion for his tennis players during a rainy summer. The outdoor tennis courts were largely unusable, so Bronson came up with a series of elaborate tennis hybrid games that could be played indoors or on grass fields. The most popular of these games was toccer, which is a combination of tennis and soccer. At the insistence of his campers and with their help, Bronson devised the first written rules of the sport later that summer.

In 2010, the rules were modified at Windridge Camp at Teela-Wooket in Roxbury, Vermont. Players discovered the sport and modified the rules to allow only goalkeepers to carry rackets. In this modified format, field players advance the ball by throwing it across the field (and into the goal). After a year of experimental rules testing, the governing body of Tennis Polo, the Tennis Polo Players Association (TPA), codified the Vermont format as the official format of toccer.

Tennis Polo is the first field sport known to be invented by an African-American. The only other sport known to have been created by an African-American is steer wrestling.
