= An Aird =

Sports venue in Fort William, Highland, Scotland

- Interactive map of An Aird
- Location: An Aird, Fort William, Highland, Scotland
- Coordinates: 56.8233°N 5.1020°W
- Owner: Highland Council
- Operator: Highland Council
- Capacity: 400

Tenant
- Fort William Shinty Club (Premier League) (1980s–present)

An Aird is both an area of Fort William, Scotland, and also the largest dedicated shinty park in the town and is situated on the east bank of Loch Linnhe, near the centre of the town. It is located next to the Nevis Centre. An Aird regularly hosts both the Camanachd Cup Final and the Composite Rules Shinty/Hurling Internationals and is considered one of the finest parks in shinty. It is home to Fort William Shinty Club's various squads who have played there since moving from Claggan Park in the 1980s.

The capacity of the stadium is 5000, comprising a small stand which seats 400 and standing. It also has Fort William's clubhouse on the premises.

Despite shinty's profile in the town, efforts are afoot to evict Fort William Shinty Club from An Aird, in order to build a supermarket. The local authority, Highland Council, have come under fire for their care of the park, especially after the playing surface was stripped bare by rabbits. The company behind the planned development of a new supermarket were unequivocal in stating in April 2007 that there would be no development upon the An Aird pitch. In March 2008, Highland Council again came under fire for their negligence of the An Aird surface, which almost resulted in the loss of An Aird's prestigious status as a Camanachd Cup Final host stadium. In February 2009 the stadium was attacked by vandals causing thousands of pounds of damage.

The shinty club will be forced to move to the Black Park in Fort William in season 2010 in order for renovation work to be done on the pitch at An Aird.

The area was again marked for development in late 2010 with plans being made by an Edinburgh-based company to develop the site for a supermarket. This would involve moving the shinty club to a new location within the town. Uncertainty over the availability of An Aird led to it losing the 2011 Camanachd Cup Final. The club used Black Parks, near Inverlochy, for most of 2012.
