= Nikolay Sazhin =

Russian chess boxer (born 1988)

- Born: September 15, 1988 (age 37); Krasnoyarsk, Soviet Union
- Occupation: Chess Boxer

Nikolay Sergeevich Sazhin (Russian: Николай Сергеевич Сажин; September 15, 1988, Krasnoyarsk, Russia, then USSR) is a former world champion of chess boxing. Sazhin has an Elo rating of 1911. Sazhin's overall record was at that point 49–13–0. His alias is "The Siberian Express" or "The Chairman" (Председатель, Predsedatel').

== Biography ==
Sazhin was 19 when he won the title from Frank Stoldt in July 2008. He defended his title, which wasn't actually his, as somebody else had won it in the meantime, in London in March 2012 against Andy Costello winning by checkmate in the 9th round. The news posted on May 20, 2013, revealed that Sazhin's unknown title was sanctioned by World Chessboxing Association (WCBA). In addition, the official website of WCBA showed that Nikolay Sazhin was sanctioned as the current world champion at double weight divisions of Light heavyweight and Heavyweight.

== Record ==
Professional Chess boxing record
4 Fights, 3 Wins (0 KOs, 3 CMs) 1 Losses
Date	Result	Opponent	Event	Location	Method	Round	Time
2012-03-20	Win	(England) Andy "The Rock" Costello	International Chessboxing	London, England	Check Mate	9	
Wins title of WCBA World Light heavyweight and Heavyweight championships.
2011-10-22	Win	(England) Andy "The Rock" Costello	International Chessboxing	Krasnoyarsk, Russia			
2009-11-28	Loss	(Germany) Leo "Granit" Kraft		Krasnoyarsk, Siberia, Russia	Check Mate	9	
Loses title of WCBO World Light heavyweight championship.
2008-07-05	Win	(Germany) Frank "Anti Terror" Stoldt	Chessboxing Tournament Berlin 2008	Berlin, Germany	Check Mate	9	
Wins Stoldt's title of WCBO World Light heavyweight championship.
Legend: Win Loss Draw/No contest Notes

Sporting positions
Preceded by Frank "Anti Terror" Stoldt	2nd WCBO World Light heavyweight Champion; July 5, 2008 – November 28, 2009	Succeeded by Leo "Granit" Kraft
Preceded by	1st WCBA World Light heavyweight Champion; March 20, 2012 – Current	Succeeded by
Preceded by	1st WCBA World Heavyweight Champion; March 20, 2012 – Current	Succeeded by
