= World Chess Boxing Organisation =

Governing body of the sport of chessboxing

- Abbreviation: WCBO
- Formation: 2003; 23 years ago
- Type: Nonprofit Organisation
- Legal status: Charity
- Purpose: Sport, Humanitarian, Social, Peacekeeping
- Headquarters: Berlin, Germany
- Members: 38 Countries (March 2024)
- Official language: English
- President: Lara Armas
- Website: chessboxing.world

The World Chess Boxing Organisation (WCBO) is a governing body of the sport chessboxing. The WCBO was founded by Iepe Rubingh, founder of the sport, in 2003 and has its headquarters in Berlin, Germany. Its current president is Lara Armas from France.

The principal tasks of the WCBO include: training people in the number one thinking sport and the number one fighting sport and the combination of both; building up a worldwide structure of chess boxing clubs and organisations; promoting chess boxing; and holding championship and promotional fights.

The WCBO's motto is: "Fighting is done in the ring and wars are waged on the board".

== Affiliated organisations ==
Currently, WCBO is affiliated with chessboxing organisations in 38 nations:

=== First Nations ===
- Chess Boxing Organisation of India
- Turkey Chessboxing Federation
- Italian Chessboxing Federation
- France Chessboxing Federation
- Russian Chessboxing Federation
- Chile Chessboxing Association
- Latvia Chessboxing Federation
- Kazakhstan Chessboxing Federation
- U.S. Chessboxing
- Chess Boxing Club Berlin (CBCB, founded in August 2005)
- Latvian Chessboxing Federation
- Nordic Chessboxing Federation (Finland)
- Bulgarian Chess Boxing Organisation
- Maple Leaf Chessboxing (Canada)

=== List of Current Nations ===
Asia [ 11 ]

- India
- Kazakhstan
- Iran
- Afghanistan
- Kyrgyz Republic
- Philippines
- Lebanon
- Uzbekistan
- Tajikistan
- Nepal
- Cyprus

Africa [ 5 ]

- Equatorial Guinea
- Uganda
- Algeria
- Gambia
- Ethiopia

Europe [ 16 ]

- Germany
- France
- Italy
- Turkey
- Russia
- Finland
- Netherlands
- Greece
- Switzerland
- Poland
- Latvia
- Serbia
- Denmark
- Spain
- Armenia
- Georgia

Oceania [ 2 ]

- Australia
- New Zealand

The Americas [ 4 ]

- Mexico
- Canada
- United States
- Chile

== See also ==
- Chess boxing
- World Chessboxing Association
- List of Chess boxing champions
