= Camanachd Association =

World governing body of the Scottish sport of shinty

The Camanachd Association
- Comann na Camanachd
- Formation: 10 October 1893; 132 years ago
- Founded at: Kingussie
- Type: Sports federation
- Location: Inverness, Scotland
- Region served: Scotland
- Members: 3349 players (2025)
- Official language: English, Scottish Gaelic
- President: Burton Morrison
- Board of directors: Burton Morrison, Willie MacDonald, John MacRitchie, Barry Martin, Graeme MacDiarmid, Kevin Thain, Alister MacKinnon, Andy Watt
- Affiliations: SportsScotland
- Staff: 11 (2026)
- Website: http://www.shinty.com

The New Logo of the Camanachd Association, with the Stag's Head (Cabar Feidh)

The Camanachd Association (in Scottish Gaelic, Comann na Camanachd) is the world governing body of the Scottish sport of shinty. The body is based in Inverness, Highland, and is in charge of the rules of the game. Its main competitions are the Tulloch Homes Camanachd Cup, Mowi Premiership and the Mowi Valerie Fraser Camanachd Cup, as well as the annual composite shinty-hurling series with fellow Gaelic sporting federation the Irish GAA.

== Structure ==
The Camanachd Association was founded in 1893 after a meeting in Kingussie in order to formalize a set of rules for the many shinty clubs across the British Isles.

The Camanachd Association maintained its initial structure for much of its first century, but the ‘Future of Shinty' Report published in 1981 led to a compete restructuring of the way in which shinty was organised and managed. That, in turn, led to the move away from a dependence on volunteers to govern the sport, to the Association's first salaried employees being employed. This also resulted in the other myriad associations which organised shinty coming under the Association. Other associations which still have a strong role in organising shinty are the Glasgow Celtic Society, the Macaulay Association, the Women's Camanachd Association and formerly the Schools Camanachd Association.

In 2005, the Camanachd Association changed its structure again and moved to being a company limited by guarantee with no share capital. The company is overseen by a board of directors, most of whom are volunteers who are chosen by the members at the AGM. The association employs 11 full time staff across the country, and has been headquartered at Bught Park Pavilion since its 2025 redevelopment. Having hosted Shinty since the 1920's, the Bught Park currently hosts the MacTavish Cup Final, the Shinty/Hurling international and the Camanachd Cup Final on a rotational basis, as well as being the location of Shinty's Story - Sgeul na Camanachd, a permanent bilingual exhibition dedicated to the sport.

The membership of the association consists of shinty clubs and related associations, such as the Glasgow Celtic Society. The membership appoints non-salaried office-bearers through the Annual General Meeting, which is also the only medium through which the playing rules of shinty can be altered.

== Recent history ==
=== Competitions ===
Newtonmore defeated Lovat by three goals to nil to retain the 2018 Tulloch Homes Camanachd Cup. The final which was played at Mossfield Stadium, Oban was Newtonmore's 3rd consecutive victory and their 33rd in total. Despite two North teams contesting, the final in Oban attracted a crowd in excess of 2,000 spectators, plus a large additional audience tuning in via live TV, radio and online broadcasts. Newtonmore forward Evan Menzies, who scored two goals, won the Albert Smith Medal for Man of the Match. The 2018 Artemis Macaulay Cup Final in Oban saw Kinlochshiel defeating Kyles Athletic by three goals to two, with the outcome in doubt until the final whistle. Both these finals were broadcast live on BBC2 Scotland.

Newtonmore defeated Kinlochshiel by two goals to one to retain the Cottages.com MacTavish Cup at Bught Park, Inverness in a match which was broadcast live on BBC ALBA. The Glasgow Celtic Society Cup Final was also broadcast live on BBC ALBA and was won by Oban Camanachd who defeated Kyles Athletic by two goals to nil at Taynuilt. The Liberty British Aluminium Balliemore Cup Final was held at An Aird, Fort William where Kilmallie triumphed over Glasgow Mid Argyll by three goals to two. The Aberdein Considine Sutherland Cup Final was won by Newtonmore, who defeated Kingussie by five goals to two at The Dell, Kingussie.

Lochside Rovers won the Bullough Cup defeating Kyles Athletic by five goals to two in an encounter played at Strachur. Newtonmore defeated Fort William to win the Strathdearn Cup with a four goals to nil victory at the Bught Park, Inverness.

The Women's Cup Finals Day again took place at The Dell, Kingussie. Badenoch & Strathspey won in the Valerie Fraser Camanachd Cup defeating Skye by four goals to one whilst Glenurquhart won the Marine Harvest Challenge Cup by four goals to three against Inverness. The Finals Day drew a large crowd. The Valerie Fraser Camanachd Cup was broadcast live on BBC ALBA for the first time.

The Marine Harvest Senior Men's Shinty/Hurling International between Scotland and Ireland at the Bught Park on 20 October was won by Scotland, their fifth consecutive Bught Park victory, to retain the Marine Harvest Quaich. The final score was Scotland 1 – 11 (14) and Ireland 1 – 9 (12). Scotland's Senior Women played their Shinty/Camogie challenge match against Dublin at the Bught Park prior to the Senior International. The final score was Scotland 4 – 1 (13) Dublin 0 – 2 (2). Scotland defeated their Irish counterparts to win the Marine Harvest Under 21 Shinty / Hurling International trophy in a match played on 3 November at Abbotstown, the GAA's National Development Centre in Dublin. The score was Ireland 2 – 7 (13) Scotland 6 – 7 (25).

Participation in the senior leagues in 2018 dropped to 53 teams from 54 in 2017, as a result of Dunoon not entering a team. The Marine Harvest Premiership comprised ten teams, with eight teams in the Marine Harvest National Div, there were eight teams in Marine Harvest North Div 1 and eleven teams in Marine Harvest North Div 2, Marine Harvest South Div 1 had ten teams with six teams in Marine Harvest South Div 2.

In total there have been 655 senior fixtures scheduled in 2018, compared to 689 in 2017. 29 fixtures were unfulfilled due to team raising difficulties, down from 39 in 2017. 92 fixtures were postponed and rescheduled compared to 125 in 2017, of that 92, 53 were due to unplayable fields and 8 due to bereavement, a further 26 were rescheduled at the request of both clubs in compliance with the Byelaws. During 2018, 12 fixtures were reversed or transferred to an alternative venue to ensure the game took place on the scheduled date, this compares with 9 in the previous year, 14 fixtures were played midweek.

Not held in 2020 due to COVID-19 not possible to be played in 2021 but back in 2022.

Newtonmore won The Marine Harvest Premiership by six points despite losing two of their first 4 league fixtures; this was their eighth league title in the last nine years. Both Skye and Glenurquhart, having finished in the bottom two positions of the Premiership, are relegated and both will play in the Marine Harvest National Division in 2019. Kilmallie won the Marine Harvest National Division, and they will be joined in the Premiership by Inveraray.

Newtonmore won Marine Harvest North Div 1 again, but being a 2nd Team, they are not eligible to be promoted. Bute won Marine Harvest South Div 1 and will play in the Marine Harvest National Division in 2019. Lovat won Marine Harvest North Div 2 and are promoted to play in Marine Harvest North Div 1 in 2019 with Aberdeen University, who finished bottom of Marine Harvest North Div 1 replacing them. Strachur won Marine Harvest South Div 2 dropping only 2 points. Kilmory will replace them in Marine Harvest South Div 2. With only two fixtures remaining Kilmory advised that they were unable to complete their league programme and wished to withdraw from the league; however, they hope to regroup and play in Marine Harvest South Div 2 next season. All results involving Kilmory were removed from the league as one of their remaining fixtures could have affected the outcome of the title.

== International ==
The association co-ordinates the Scotland national shinty team, which plays annually against Ireland in the Shinty/Hurling International Series, a series played under the hybrid rules of Composite rules shinty–hurling.
