= Composite rules shinty–hurling =

Hybrid sport between shinty and hurling

- Highest governing body: Camanachd Association; Gaelic Athletic Association
- First played: 1896
- Clubs: none

Characteristics
- Contact: Full
- Team members: 14 or 15 (depends on their rules)
- Mixed-sex: No; women's form known as shinty/camogie
- Type: Hybrid sport, team sport
- Equipment: Hurley; Caman; Sliotar/Shinty ball
- Venue: Shinty pitch Hurling pitch

Presence
- Country or region: Ireland; Scotland
- Olympic: No

Composite rules shinty–hurling (Irish: Comhrialacha camanachd-iománaíocht) – sometimes known simply as shinty–hurling – is a hybrid sport of the traditional Gaelic games of shinty and hurling which was developed to facilitate international matches between the two sports.

Shinty–hurling is one of few team sports in the world without any dedicated clubs or leagues. It is currently played by both men's and women's teams only in tournaments or once-off internationals. The women's form of the game is called shinty/camogie.

== Rules ==
The rules of the composite sport are designed to allow for neither side to gain an advantage, eliminating or imposing certain restrictions. The goals are those used in hurling, with 3 points for a goal (in the net under the crossbar) and 1 point for a shot over the crossbar. For the 2012 International Series, a goal became worth 5 points in an effort to increase the number of goals. This rule was abandoned for the 2013 series, in favour of the traditional model of 3 points for a goal.

Players may not catch the ball unless they are the goalkeeper (or a defender on the line for a penalty) and this must be released within three steps. Players may not kick the ball, but can drag the ball with their foot.

Although there is a statutory size for the ball to be used in the games, there is often a custom of using a sliotar in one half and a shinty ball in the other. Each half lasts 35 minutes.

== History ==
The first games played were challenge matches between London Camanachd and London GAA in 1896 and Glasgow Cowal and Dublin Celtic in 1897 and 1898, with the first game played at Celtic Park. Hiatus then came until Scottish representative teams and Irish sides took place in the 1920s. Following intermittent international games between Scotland and an all-Ireland team before the Second World War, controversy arose as the British government put pressure upon the Camanachd Association to cease from co-operating with the Gaelic Athletic Association, disapproving of their perceived anti-British viewpoint.

Universities in both countries however kept the link going after the war and this led to a resumption of international fixtures between the two codes in the 1970s.

After a long run of Irish successes, Scotland won four fixtures in a row from 2005 until Ireland reclaimed the title in 2009. Scotland's successes have been marred by a lack of interest from an Irish perspective. Unlike the international rules football tests between Australia and Ireland, few players from the top flight counties participate in the event—though in recent times this trend has bucked and more higher ranked Irish players have represented their nation.

2007 also saw the use of compromise rules as a way of developing the Gaelic languages in Ireland and Scotland by the Columba Initiative when Iomain Cholmcille was founded. A team called Alba, made up of Scottish Gaelic speakers, played Mícheál Breathnach CLG, from Inverin, Galway. The competition has since expanded to include a team representative of Ulster Gaelic speakers, Fir Uladh, and the Dublin-based Gaelic speaking team, Na Gaeil Óga CLG. The first woman's competition was held in 2015 and is played between Alba, Mná Uladh (a camogie team representative of Ulster Gaelic speakers), and Cumann Camógaíochta Cois Fharraige from the Conamara Gaeltacht, County Galway.

There are also Scottish/Irish women's and under-21s sides which have competed against one another.

In 2009, the first full shinty–hurling match in the United States took place between Skye Camanachd and the San Francisco Rovers.

In 2010, the fixture was played at Croke Park before the international rules football game and then a return leg was played at the Bught Park two weeks later.

In April 2012, the inaugural match between the teams of Irish Defence Forces and the British Army was played at Bught Park in aid of PoppyScotland.

== International series ==
An international series for men, women and under 21s is played annually, with test matches rotating between venues in Scotland and Ireland. Ireland are the leading team in the series, having won 9 of 16 senior men's test matches. Camogie–shinty is the women's version of the game.

== See also ==
- Shinty–Hurling International Series
- International rules football
- Iomain
