= Bught Park =

Sports venue in Inverness, Scotland

- Location within Inverness area
- Address: Torvean Avenue, Inverness, Scotland
- Coordinates: 57.4660°N 4.2339°W
- Owner: Highland Council
- Operator: Highland Council
- Capacity: 5,000

Tenant
- Inverness Shinty Club (1910–present) Multiple Inverness and District Football Association clubs Clachnacuddin Reserves (2026–present)

Bught Park (Gaelic: Pàirc nam Bochd) is the largest park in the city of Inverness, Scotland, and is situated on the western bank of the River Ness. It is home to the Inverness Highland Games and a small scale outdoor music festival. It is located next to the city's sports centre, swimming pool and BMX track and is also adjacent to Inverness Botanic Gardens and Cafe, all of which once formed the grounds of a now demolished stately home.

Inverness Botanic Garden, which backs onto the park, is the most northerly botanic garden in the United Kingdom. Opened by Prince Edward, Duke of Edinburgh in 1992, it is home to two glasshouses: a humid tropical house and a cactus house. There are also gardens which are used for local education purposes, as well as kitchen garden and onsite cafe. The gardens lie on the grounds of an 18th-century stately home, Bught House. The walled garden once attached to the house now forms the modern garden.

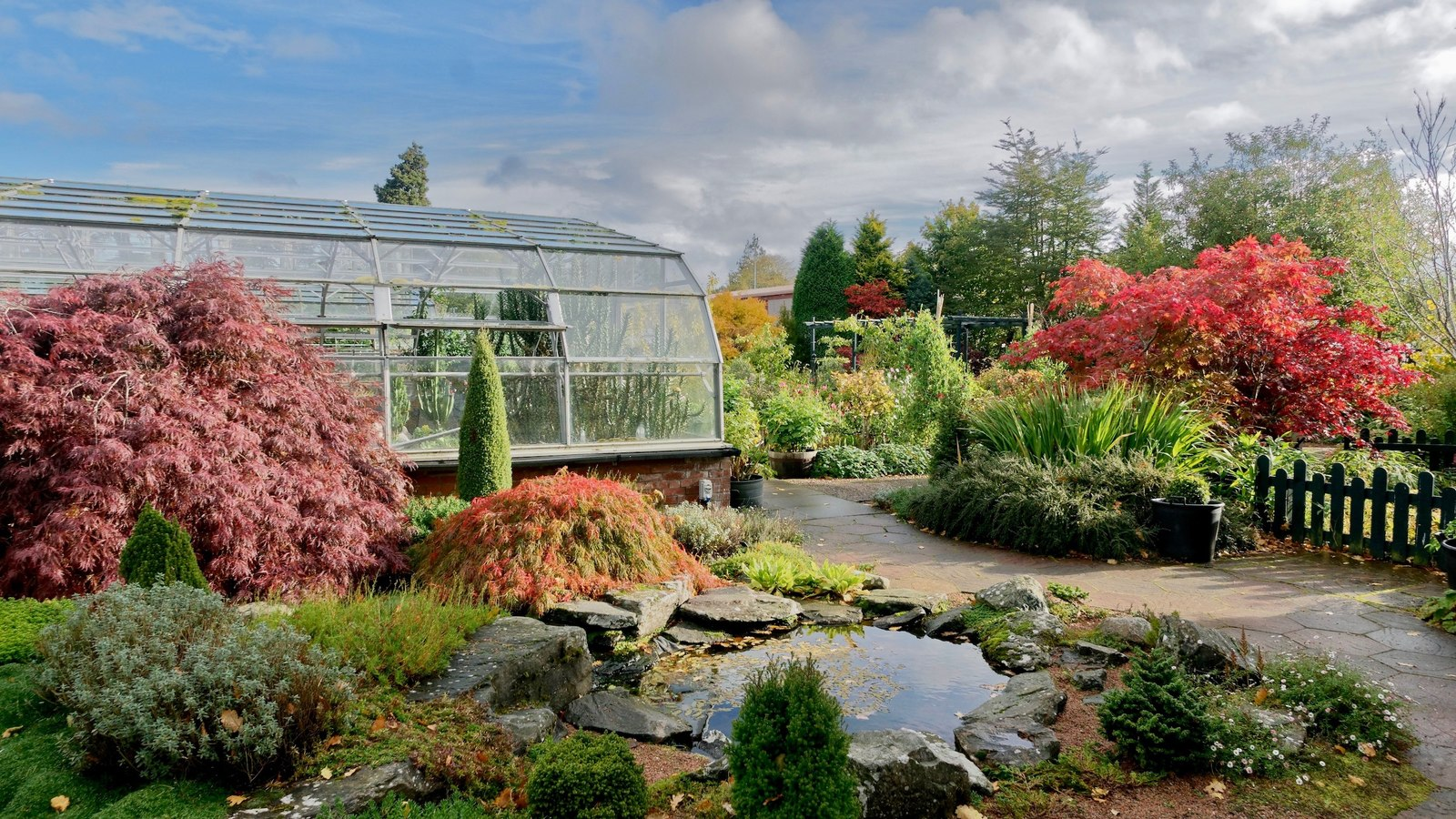
Inverness Botanic Garden

The Bught Park is also the name for the sports stadium situated within the confines of the park which regularly hosts both the Camanachd Cup Final and the Composite Rules Shinty/Hurling Internationals and is considered one of the finest parks in shinty. It is also home to Inverness Shinty Club who have played there since the 1920s. The park is situated on land that was formerly the Bught House estate. An 18th century stately home on the site was demolished for the creation of the Ice Centre in the 1960s.

The capacity of the stadium is 5000, comprising standing and the wooden grandstand. The stadium was the centre of controversy in June 2009 when Highland Council, having evicted Inverness City from the Northern Meeting Park offered the use of the facility to the football team without consulting with the shinty club.

At the start of the 2026-27 season, it was announced that Clachnacuddin 'A' would be allowed to use Bught Park for their home matches.

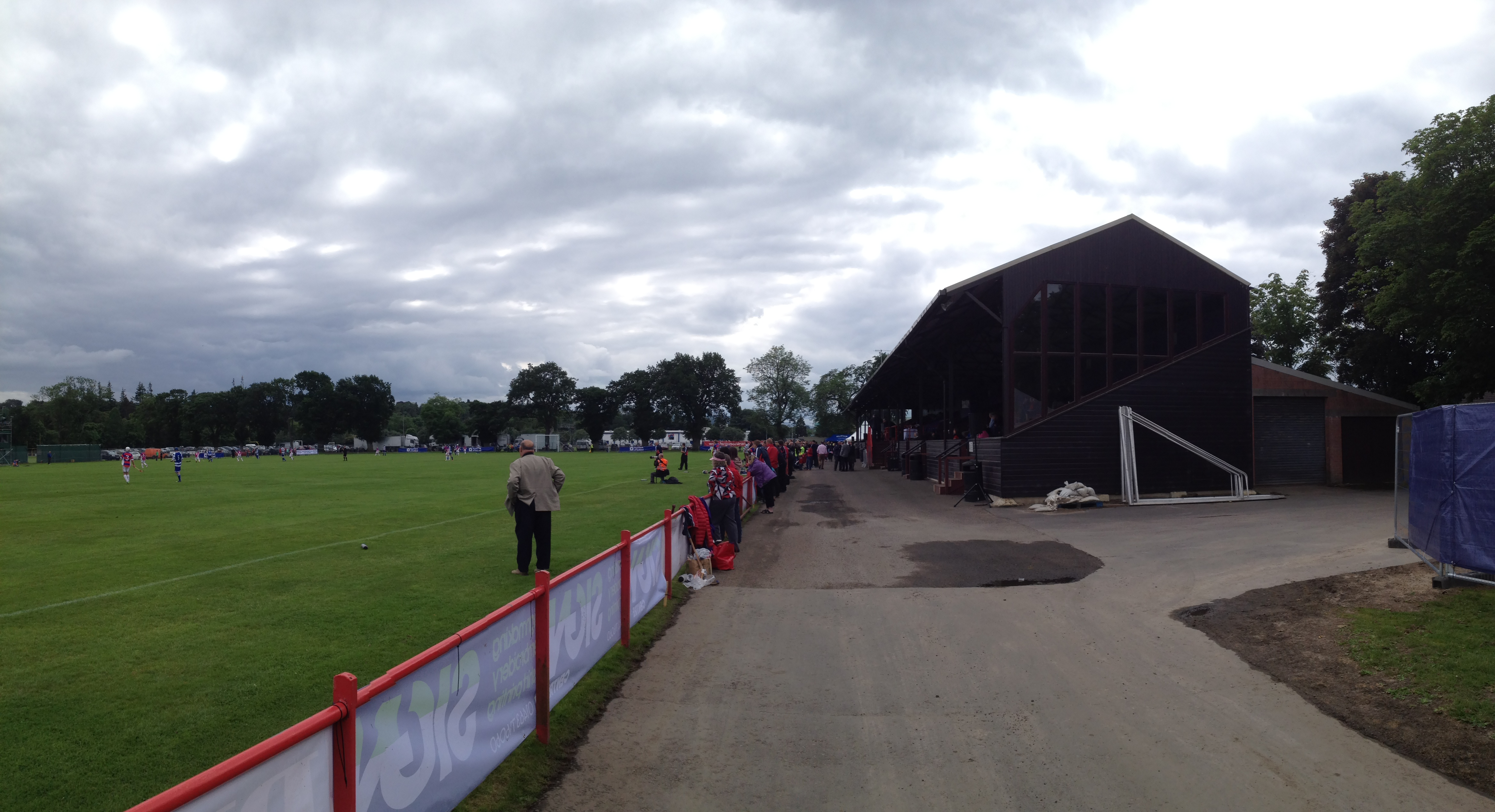
The Bught Park Stadium Inverness - Photo Taken at MacTavish Cup Final 2014

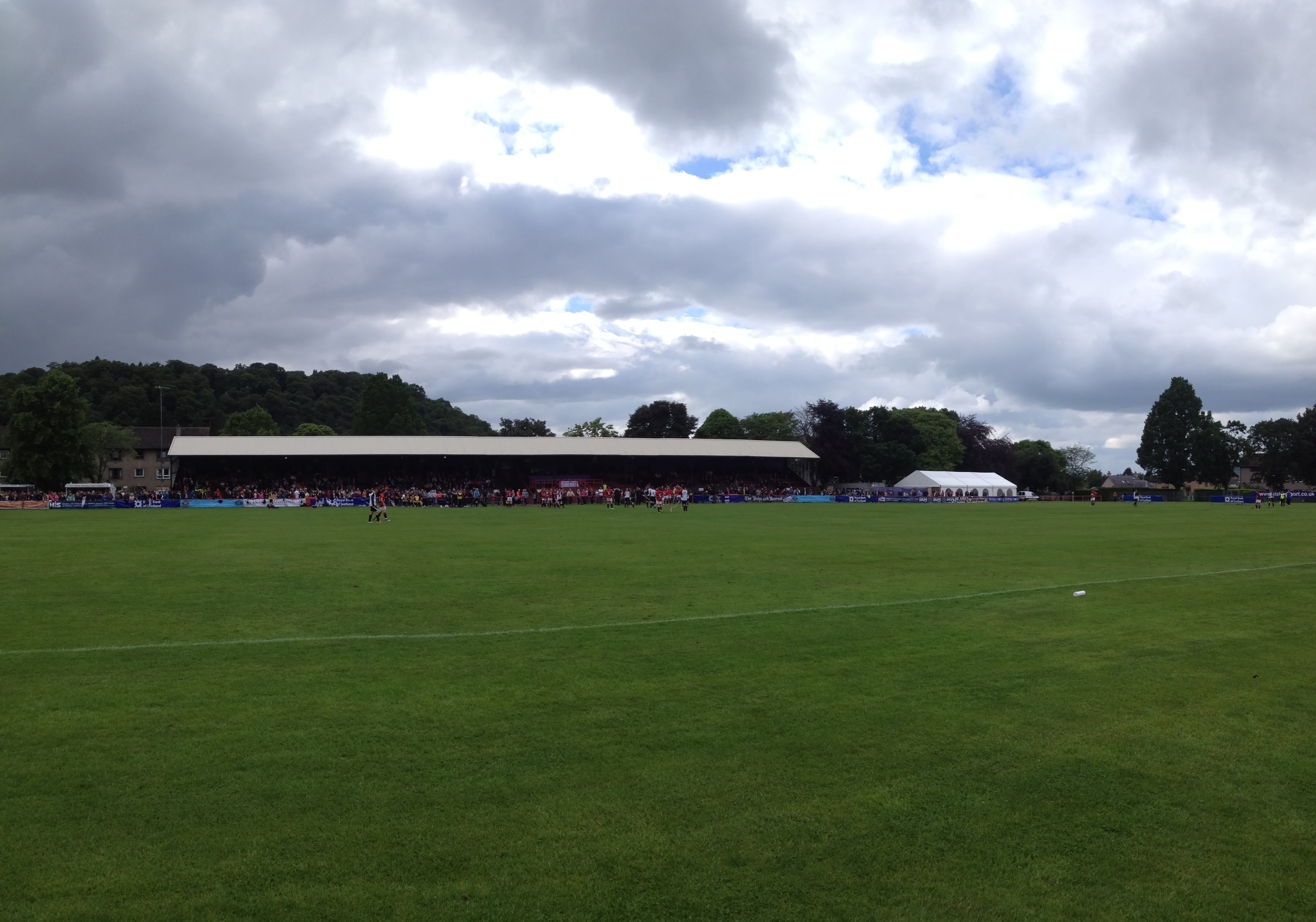
The Bught Park Stadium Inverness - Photo Taken at MacTavish Cup Final 2014
