= Champion 15 Awards =

Hurling prizes

The official Champion 15 Awards are presented annually to players in the sport of hurling. The awards were instituted in 2005. They have been presented in various guises since then. Below is a partial list of past winners.

== 2005–2017 ==
The Christy Ring Cup Champion 15 Awards were presented between 2005 and 2017, during the period when the Christy Ring Cup allowed competitors direct entry to the All-Ireland Senior Hurling Championship. Unlike the All Star Awards, the 15 players selected were not chosen by position and players received nominations at the end of each game from opposing team managers. Under the selection format, the competition winner had three players honoured, while two players from each of the two semi-finalists and two players the other finalist were also recognised, in addition to one player from each of the other participating county teams. Champion 15 Awards for the Nicky Rackard Cup and Lory Meagher Cup were also awarded at various times during this period, such as in 2010, shortly after the latter's establishment.

=== 2005 ===
Christy Ring Cup Champion 15 Award winners

Enda McLoughlin, Killian Cosgrove and Andrew Mitchell (Westmeath), Gareth Johnson and Martin Coulter (Down), Pat Coady and Robert Foley (Carlow), Mattie Dowd and David Harney (Kildare), Gregory Biggs (Derry), John Mike Dooley (Kerry), Keith Higgins (Mayo), Joey Toole (Meath), Mike Keaveney (Roscommon) and Joe Murphy (Wicklow)

Nicky Rackard Cup Champion 15 Award winners?

=== 2006 ===
Christy Ring Cup Champion 15 Award winners

Malachy Molloy, Paddy Richmond, Ciarán Herron (all Antrim), Pat Coady, Des Murphy (both Carlow), Eoin Hannon (Kildare), Paudie Reidy (Kildare), Paddy Barrett (Mayo), Paul Braniff (Down), Gary Savage (Down), Joe Murphy (Wicklow), Aidan Healy (Kerry), Michael Kelly (Roscommon), Fergus McMahon (London) and David Donnelly (Meath)

Nicky Rackard Cup Champion 15 Award winners?

=== 2007 ===
Christy Ring Cup Champion 15 Award winners

Patrick Clarke, Paddy Dowdall, Derek McNicholas (all Westmeath), David Kennedy, Billy White (Kildare), Enda Keogh, Steven Clynch (Meath), Andrew Gaul, Edward Coady (both Carlow), Shane Brick (Kerry), Stephen Broderick (Mayo), Graham Clarke (Down), Don Hyland (Wicklow), Keith Kennedy (London), Michael Conway (Derry)

Nicky Rackard Cup Champion 15 Award winners?

=== 2008 ===
Christy Ring Cup Champion 15 Award winners

Mark Brennan (Carlow), John Rogers (Carlow), Shane Kavanagh (Carlow), Brendan Murtagh (Westmeath), Paul Greville (Westmeath), Aidan Connolly (Mayo), Stephen Henry (Derry), Micheál Kelly (Roscommon), Nial Hackett (Meath), Tony Murphy (Kildare), Jonathan O'Neill (Wicklow), Paul Braniff (Down), Eugene McDonnell (Armagh), Niall Healy (London), John Griffin (Kerry)

Nicky Rackard Cup Champion 15 Award winners?

=== 2009 ===
Christy Ring Cup Champion 15 Award winners

Andrew Gaul (Carlow), Shane Kavanagh (Carlow), John Rogers (Carlow), James Hickey (Carlow), Fintan Conway (Down), Sean Ennis (Down), Ruari McGrattan (Down), Conor Ryan (Mayo), Adrian Freeman (Mayo), Tom Murnane (Kerry), Shane Brick (Kerry), Paul Dermody (Kildare), Jeffrey Bermingham (Wicklow), Greg Gavin (Westmeath), Sean McCullagh (Derry)

Nicky Rackard Cup Champion 15 Award winners?

Lory Meagher Cup Champion 15 Award winners

Jamesie Donnelly (Donegal)

=== 2010 ===
Separate teams for the Ring, Rackard and Meagher Cups were announced in December 2010.

Christy Ring Cup Champion 15 Award winners

Player	Team
Tom Murnane	Kerry
Mikey Boyle	Kerry
Darragh O'Connell	Kerry
Andy O'Brien	Wicklow
Jonathan O'Neill	Wicklow
Derek McConn	Mayo
Kevin Hinphey	Derry
Nicky Horan	Meath
Paul Braniff	Down
Neil Ó Muineacháin	Kildare
Paudie Reidy	Kildare
Andrew Mitchell	Westmeath
Joe Clarke	Westmeath
Paul Greville	Westmeath
Eoin Price	Westmeath

Player previously selected for a Christy Ring Champion 15 Award.

Nicky Rackard Cup Champion 15 Award winners

Paul McCormack (Armagh), Barry Breen (Armagh), Paul Gaffney (Amagh), Ryan Gaffney (Armagh), Alan Cawley (Sligo), Ronan Cox (Sligo), Padraic Dolan (Roscommon), Colm Moran (Roscommon), Paul Murphy (Monaghan), Michael Cussen (Fingal), David Dunne (Louth), Damien Maguire (Tyrone), John Joe Burke (London), Mark Mythen (London), Richard O'Connell (London)

Lory Meagher Cup Champion 15 Award winners

Gareth McGhee (Longford), Joe O'Brien (Longford), Declan Toner (Longford), Seán Browne (Longford), Martin Coyle (Longford), Mark Patton (Donegal), Ardal McDermott (Donegal), Paul O'Brien (Donegal), Mark Slevin (Fermanagh), Barry Smith (Fermanagh), Cormac Neligan (Cavan), Eamon Hansberry (Warwickshire), Michael Poniard (Leitrim), Keith Connolly (Leitrim), James McGrath (South Down)

=== 2011 ===
Christy Ring Cup Champion 15 Award winners

James Godley, Jason Casey, Shane Nolan, Darragh O'Connell (Kerry), Eamonn Kearns, Stephen Kelly, Andy O'Brien (Wicklow), John Doran, Tony Murphy (Kildare), Eoin Clarke, Brendan Ennis (Down), Cahal Carvill (Armagh), Oisin McCloskey (Derry), Shane Morley (Mayo), Shane McGann (Meath)

Nicky Rackard Cup Champion 15 Award winners?

Lory Meagher Cup Champion 15 Award winners?

=== 2012 ===
Christy Ring Cup Champion 15 Award winners

Brian Costello, Jonathan Maher, Eddie Walsh, Ger Fennelly (London), Eamonn Kearns, Jonathan O'Neill, Ronan Keddy (Wicklow), Paul Braniff, Conor Woods (Down), Willie Mahady, Steven Clynch (Meath), Mark Moloney (Kildare), Alan Grant (Derry), Donal O'Brien (Mayo), Paud Costello (Kerry)

Nicky Rackard Cup Champion 15 Award winners?

Lory Meagher Cup Champion 15 Award winners?

=== 2013 ===
Christy Ring Cup Champion 15 Award winners

Paul Braniff (Down), Gareth Johnson (Down), Conor Woods (Down), Patrick Hughes (Down), Bernard Rochford (Kerry), Darren Dineen (Kerry), Shane Nolan (Kerry), Fiachra Ó Muineacháin (Kildare), Gerard Keegan (Kildare), Steven Clynch (Meath), Sean Heavey (Meath), Derek McDonnell (Mayo), Paddy Kelly (Derry), Liam Kennedy (Wicklow), Nathan Curry (Armagh)

Nicky Rackard Cup Champion 15 Award winners?

Lory Meagher Cup Champion 15 Award winners?

=== 2014 ===
Christy Ring Cup Champion 15 Award winners

Richie Hoban (Kildare), Martin Fitzgerald (Kildare), Paul Dermody (Kildare), Gerry Keegan (Kildare), Bryan Murphy (Kerry), Daniel Collins (Kerry), Pádraig Boyle (Kerry), Cormac Reilly (Meath), William McGrath (Meath), Ciaran Charlton (Mayo), David Kenny (Mayo), Aaron Kelly (Derry), Stephen Kelly (Wicklow), Stephen Renaghan (Armagh), Conor Woods (Down)

Nicky Rackard Cup Champion 15 Award winners?

Lory Meagher Cup Champion 15 Award winners?

=== 2015 ===
Christy Ring Cup Champion 15 Award winners

B Cuddihy (Wicklow), Keith Keoghan (Meath), M Ryan (London), K Feeney (Mayo), Bernard Deay (Kildare), Gerry Keegan (Kildare), Danny Toner (Down), F Conway (Down), S McCullagh (Derry), R Convery (Derry), C Quinn (Derry), Shane Nolan (Kerry), John Egan (Kerry), Patrick Kelly (Kerry), Keith Carmody (Kerry)

Nicky Rackard Cup Champion 15 Award winners?

Lory Meagher Cup Champion 15 Award winners

Keith Raymond, Gerard O'Kelly-Lynch, Gary Cadden (all Sligo)

=== 2016 ===
Christy Ring Cup Champion 15 Award winners

Damien Healy (Meath), Adam Gannon (Meath), James Toher (Meath), Shane McGann (Meath), Simon McCrory (Antrim), Eoghan Campbell (Antrim), Ciarán Clarke (Antrim), John Doran (Kildare), Gerry Keegan (Kildare), John McManus (Down), Caolan Taggart (Down), Oisin McCloskey (Derry), Luke Maloney (Wicklow), Tomás Lawrence (London), Micheál Kelly (Roscommon)

Nicky Rackard Cup Champion 15 Award winners?

Lory Meagher Cup Champion 15 Award winners?

=== 2017 ===
Christy Ring Cup Champion 15 Award winners

Enda Cooney (London), Paul Divilly (Kildare), Ger McManus (Mayo), Padraig Kelly (Roscommon), Eamonn Kearns (Wicklow), Andy O'Brien (Wicklow), Michael Hughes (Down), Eoghan Sands (Down), Chrissy O'Connell (Antrim), John Dillon (Antrim), Paddy Burke (Antrim), Alan Corcoran (Carlow), John Michael Nolan (Carlow), James Doyle (Carlow), Richard Coady (Carlow)

Nicky Rackard Cup Champion 15 Award winners?

Lory Meagher Cup Champion 15 Award winners?

== Since 2018 ==
The Joe McDonagh Cup began in 2018, replacing the Christy Ring Cup in allowing competitors direct entry to the All-Ireland Senior Hurling Championship. The team selected was initially referred to as "Champion 15", but later became "Team of the Year". However, that selection is also still referred to as a "Champion 15" by official sources.

Champion 15 Awards continued to be given after the intent of the original was subsumed by the Joe McDonagh Cup Team of the Year. They have been presented to the players at the main Hurling All Stars event, held at the Convention Centre Dublin (such as in 2019), or, separately, at their own event (as in 2024 and 2025).

=== 2018 ===
The 2018 Champion 15 selection excluded the Christy Ring Cup, which continued to receive its own selection for that year only. This meant it was possible to include for the first time on the main Champion 15 selection a player each from lesser teams like Cavan and Fermanagh, who were involved in the 2018 Lory Meagher Cup, and were the only two teams not to make it to the final. Fermanagh's Ryan Bogue was selected, as was Kevin Connelly for Cavan. The 2018 selection was not assigned numbers and was presented similarly to the original Christy Ring Cup Champion 15 Awards.

Declan Coulter (Donegal), Stephen Gillespie (Donegal), Shane Caulfield (Warwickshire) Niall McKenna (Warwickshire), Dermot Begley (Tyrone), Kevin Crawley (Monaghan), Stephen Kettle (Louth), John Casey (Longford), Declan Molloy (Leitrim), James Weir (Sligo), Gary Cadden (Sligo), Ronan Crowley (Lancashire), Edmond Kenny (Lancashire), Ryan Bogue (Fermanagh), Kevin Connelly (Cavan)

Christy Ring Cup Champion 15 Award winners

Paddy McKenna (Kildare), Eanna O'Neill (Kildare), Mark Moloney (Kildare), Jack Sheridan (Kildare), Brian Regan (London), Denis O'Regan (London), Aaron Sheehan (London), John Henderson (Wicklow), Warren Kavanagh (Wicklow), Cian Waldron (Derry), Cormac O'Doherty (Derry), Daithí Sands (Down), Stephen Renaghan (Armagh), Naos Connaughton (Roscommon), David Kenny (Mayo)

Joe McDonagh Cup Team of the Year

Awarded as Joe McDonagh Cup Champion 15.

- Edward Byrne (Carlow)
- Brian Treacy (Carlow)
- James Doyle (Carlow)
- Chris Nolan (Carlow)
- David English (Carlow)
- Paul Doyle (Carlow)
- Derek McNicholas (Westmeath)
- Allan Devine (Westmeath)
- Paul Greville (Westmeath)
- Patrick Carroll (Westmeath)
- Eoin Price (Westmeath)
- Seán Weir (Kerry)
- Ross King (Laois)
- Neil McManus (Antrim)
- Joey Keena (Meath)

=== 2019 ===
In a change from previous years, the Champion 15 players were selected from 45 nominations, with journalists and referees also involved in a committee to choose the team.

No team was selected from those competing in the Joe McDonagh Cup in 2019, although Paddy Purcell was named as that competition's Hurler of the Year. Instead, Enda Rowland and Jack Kelly of Laois received All Star nominations.

1. Simon Doherty (Armagh)
2. Caolan Taggart (Down)
3. Keith Keoghan (Meath)
4. Enda Moreton (Leitrim)
5. James Weir (Sligo)
6. James Glancy (Leitrim)
7. John Henderson (Wicklow)
8. Keith Raymond (Sligo)
9. Seán Geraghty (Meath)
10. Jack Regan (Meath)
11. Gerard O'Kelly-Lynch (Sligo)
12. Damian Casey (Tyrone)
13. Daithí Sands (Down)
14. Ronan Crowley (Lancashire)
15. Sé McGuigan (Derry)

Reference: 2019 Champion 15, 2019 Champion 15, Sky Sports

Nominations

- Paddy Purcell^{HOTY} (Laois)

=== 2020 ===
1. Stephen Keith (Down)
2. Seán McVeigh (Donegal)
3. Caolan Taggart (Down)
4. Cathal Freeman (Mayo)
5. Conor McShea (Fermanagh)
6. Rian Boran (Kildare)
7. Danny Cullen^{HOTY} (Donegal)
8. Eoghan Cahill (Offaly)
9. Paul Divilly^{HOTY} (Kildare)
10. Damian Casey (Tyrone)
11. James Burke (Kildare)
12. Shane Boland (Mayo)
13. Jack Sheridan (Kildare)
14. Andrew Mackin^{HOTY} (Louth)
15. Christy Moorehouse (Wicklow)

Reference: 2020 Champion 15

Joe McDonagh Cup Team of the Year

1. Brian Tracey (Carlow)
2. Tomás O'Connor (Kerry)
3. Mattie Donnelly (Antrim)
4. Stephen Rooney (Antrim)
5. Jason Diggins (Kerry)
6. Aonghus Clarke (Westmeath)
7. Gerard Walsh (Antrim)
8. Shane Nolan (Kerry)
9. Keelan Molloy (Antrim)
10. Niall McKenna (Antrim)
11. Shane Conway (Kerry)
12. Daniel Collins (Kerry)
13. Chris Nolan (Carlow)
14. Conor McCann^{HOTY} (Antrim)
15. Ciarán Clarke (Antrim)

By team

- Antrim – 7
- Kerry – 5
- Carlow – 2
- Westmeath – 1

Reference: Joe McDonagh Cup Team of the Year 2020, Irish Independent

=== 2021 ===
1. Simon Doherty (Armagh)
2. Seán Cassidy (Derry)
3. Ciarán Burke (Offaly)
4. Rory Porteous (Fermanagh)
5. Enda Shalvey (Cavan)
6. Ben Conneeley (Offaly)
7. David Kenny (Mayo)
8. Cathal Freeman (Mayo)
9. Cormac O'Doherty (Derry)
10. Damian Casey (Tyrone)
11. Gerard O'Kelly-Lynch (Sligo)
12. Seán Corrigan^{HOTY} (Fermanagh)
13. Oisín Kelly^{HOTY} (Offaly)
14. Eoghan Cahill (Offaly)
15. Keith Higgins^{HOTY} (Mayo)

Reference: 2021 Champion 15

Joe McDonagh Cup Team of the Year

1. Stephen Keith (Down)
2. Darragh Egerton (Westmeath)
3. Conor Woods (Down)
4. Eric Leen (Kerry)
5. Aonghus Clarke (Westmeath)
6. Tommy Doyle^{HOTY} (Westmeath)
7. Fionán Mackessy (Kerry)
8. Robbie Greville (Westmeath)
9. Brian Byrne (Kildare)
10. Davey Glennon (Westmeath)
11. Killian Doyle (Westmeath)
12. Jack Regan (Meath)
13. Chris Nolan (Carlow)
14. Niall Mitchell (Westmeath)
15. Shane Conway (Kerry)

By team

- Westmeath – 7
- Kerry – 3
- Down – 2
- Carlow – 1
- Kildare – 1
- Meath – 1

=== 2022 ===
1. Paddy McKenna (Kildare)
2. Dermot Begley (Tyrone)
3. Rian Boran (Kildare)
4. Mark Craig (Derry)
5. Chris Kearns (Tyrone)
6. Paul Divilly (Kildare)
7. Padraig Kelly (Roscommon)
8. Paddy Lynam (Longford)
9. Keith Higgins (Mayo)
10. Brian Byrne (Kildare)
11. Andrew Kilcullen (Sligo)
12. Damian Casey (Tyrone)
13. James Burke (Kildare)
14. Darren Geoghegan (Louth)
15. Daniel Glynn (Roscommon)

Joe McDonagh Cup Team of the Year

1. Ryan Elliott (Antrim)
2. Joe Maskey (Antrim)
3. Gerard Walsh (Antrim)
4. Eoin Ross (Kerry)
5. Fionán Mackessy (Kerry)
6. Eoghan Campbell (Antrim)
7. Mikey Boyle (Kerry)
8. Keelan Molloy (Antrim)
9. David Nally (Offaly)
10. Martin Kavanagh (Carlow)
11. Chris Nolan (Carlow)
12. Daithí Sands (Down)
13. Conal Cunning (Antrim)
14. Pádraig Boyle (Kerry)
15. Ciarán Clarke (Antrim)

By team

- Antrim – 7
- Kerry – 4
- Carlow – 2
- Offaly – 1
- Down – 1

Reference: Joe McDonagh Cup Team of the Year 2022, Irish Examiner

=== 2023 ===
1. Luke White (Donegal)
2. Sean Geraghty (Meath)
3. Andrew Kavanagh (Wicklow)
4. Simon Ennis (Meath)
5. Richie Mullan (Derry)
6. James Toher (Meath)
7. Danny Cullen (Donegal)
8. Cormac O'Doherty (Derry)
9. Niall Garland (Monaghan)
10. Conor Madden (Lancashire)
11. Jack Regan (Meath)
12. Éamon Óg Ó Donnchadha (Meath)
13. Christy Moorehouse (Wicklow)
14. Andy O'Brien (Wicklow)
15. Niall Arthur (Monaghan)

Reference: 2023 Champion 15

Joe McDonagh Cup Team of the Year

1. Brian Tracey (Carlow)
2. Jack McCullagh (Carlow)
3. Ciarán Burke (Offaly)
4. Ben Conneely (Offaly)
5. Jason Sampson (Offaly)
6. Fionán Mackessy (Kerry)
7. Diarmuid Byrne (Carlow)
8. James Doyle (Carlow)
9. David Nally (Offaly)
10. Stephen Maher (Laois)
11. Chris Nolan (Carlow)
12. Pearse Óg McCrickard (Down)
13. Paddy Boland (Carlow)
14. Martin Kavanagh (Carlow)
15. Eoghan Cahill (Offaly)

By team

- Carlow – 7
- Offaly – 5
- Kerry – 1
- Laois – 1
- Down – 1

Reference: Joe McDonagh Cup Team of the Year 2023

=== 2024 ===
1. Paddy McKenna (Kildare)
2. Rian Boran (Kildare)
3. Mark Craig (Derry)
4. Stephen Gillespie (Donegal)
5. Conan Boran (Kildare)
6. David Kenny (Mayo)
7. Ryan Bogue (Fermanagh)
8. Gerard Gilmore (Donegal)
9. Simon Leacy (Kildare)
10. Liam McKinney^{HOTY} (Donegal)
11. Jack Sheridan (Kildare)
12. Shane Boland (Mayo)
13. Nicky Kenny (Cavan)
14. Jack Goulding^{HOTY} (London)
15. Cian Darcy^{HOTY} (Longford)

Reference: 2024 Champion 15

Joe McDonagh Cup Team of the Year

1. Enda Rowland (Laois)
2. Diarmuid Conway (Laois)
3. Ciarán Burke (Offaly)
4. Ben Conneely (Offaly)
5. Pádraig Delaney (Laois)
6. Cillian Kiely (Offaly)
7. Fionán Mackessy (Kerry)
8. Paddy Purcell (Laois)
9. Aidan Corby (Laois)
10. Aaron Dunphy (Laois)
11. Killian Doyle (Westmeath)
12. Killian Sampson (Offaly)
13. Charlie Mitchell^{HOTY} (Offaly)
14. Brian Duignan (Offaly)
15. Daithí Sands (Down)

By team

- Laois – 6
- Offaly – 6
- Down – 1
- Kerry – 1
- Westmeath – 1

Reference: Joe McDonagh Cup Team of the Year 2024

=== 2025 ===
1. Enda Lawless (Roscommon)
2. Mark Ward (Roscommon)
3. Conor Byrne (London)
4. Oisín Greally (Mayo)
5. Enda Egan (London)
6. Conor Cosgrove^{HOTY} (Roscommon)
7. Ruairí Ó Mianáin (Derry)
8. Daniel Huane (Mayo)
9. Eamon Conway (Derry)
10. Liam O'Brien^{HOTY} (Cavan)
11. Seán Glynn^{HOTY} (London)
12. David Mangan (New York)
13. Sean Canning (Roscommon)
14. Pádraig Doyle (Wicklow)
15. Liam Lavin (Mayo)

Reference: 2025 Champion 15

Joe McDonagh Cup Team of the Year

1. Cathal Dunne (Laois)
2. Paul Doyle (Carlow)
3. Rian Boran (Kildare)
4. Simon Leacy (Kildare)
5. Pádraig Delaney (Laois)
6. Cian Boran^{HOTY} (Kildare)
7. Diarmaid Conway (Laois)
8. James Burke (Kildare)
9. Cathal McCabe (Kildare)
10. Paddy Purcell (Laois)
11. Tomás Keyes (Laois)
12. David Qualter (Kildare)
13. Martin Kavanagh (Carlow)
14. Jack Sheridan (Kildare)
15. Chris Nolan (Carlow)

By team

- Kildare – 7
- Laois – 5
- Carlow – 3

Reference: Joe McDonagh Cup Team of the Year 2025
