= Antrim county hurling team =

Hurling team

Antrim
- Sport: Hurling
- Irish: Aontroim
- Nickname(s): Saffrons; The Saffron men The Glensmen
- County board: Antrim GAA
- Manager: Davy Fitzgerald
- Captain: Conor McCann

Recent competitive record
- Current All-Ireland status: Leinster (6th in 2025; relegated to Joe McDonagh Cup)
- Last championship title: 2022 Joe McDonagh Cup
- Current NHL Division: 1B (5th in 2026)
- Last league title: None
| First colours | Second colours |

The Antrim county hurling team represents Antrim GAA, the county board of the Gaelic Athletic Association, in the Gaelic sport of hurling. The team competes in the Joe McDonagh Cup and the National Hurling League. It also contests the Ulster Senior Hurling Championship (SHC) when the competition is run, winning the latest title in 2017.

Antrim's home ground is Casement Park, Belfast. The team's manager is Davy Fitzgerald.

The team last won the Ulster SHC in 2017, but has never won the All-Ireland Senior Championship or the National League.

The team is nicknamed the Saffrons, the Saffron men or the Glensmen.

== History ==
Antrim is the only Ulster county to appear in an All-Ireland Senior Hurling Championship (SHC) final, the first of which was in 1943 losing to Cork and the second was in 1989 losing to Tipperary. In 1943 Antrim defeated both Galway (by 7–0 to 6–2) and Kilkenny (by 3–3 to 1–6) in the old Corrigan Park, but disappointed in the All-Ireland against Cork. Two years previously, Antrim had been graded Junior a year before, and had been beaten by Down in the Ulster final. It was only competing in the Senior Championship because the Junior grade was abolished. Antrim hurlers featured strongly in Ulster Railway cup final appearances in 1945, 1993 and 1995. In hurling, the progression that began with Loughgiel's success at club hurling level in 1983 (with players like 15-stone goalkeeper Niall Patterson) culminated in an All-Ireland final appearance in 1989.

Antrim's first All-Star, Ciaran Barr starred in a 4–15 to 1–15 All-Ireland semi-final win over Offaly in 1989. The final was one of the poorest on record, as stage fright overcame the Antrim team. It was no flash in the pan: Antrim failed by just two points against Kilkenny in the 1991 All-Ireland semi-final.

Antrim qualified for the 2020 Joe McDonagh Cup final.

On 12 August 2024, Antrim officials appointed Davy Fitzgerald as the senior team's manager, for two years, with a third one optional.

== Panel ==
- Team as of 4 June 2022, 2022 Joe McDonagh Cup final vs Kerry.
- Ryan Elliott
- David Kearney
- Gerard Walsh
- Paddy Burke
- Joe Maskey
- Eoghan Campbell
- Conall Bohill
- Michael Bradley
- Keelan Molloy
- James McNaughton
- Neil McManus
- Ciarán Clarke
- Conal Cunning
- Conor McCann
- Seaan Elliott

Subs used
Ryan McCambridge for E. Campbell
Daniel McKernan for C. Bohill
Domhnall Nugent for C. McCann
Niall McKenna for J. McNaughton
Conor Johnston for C. Clarke
Eoin O'Neill for N. McManus

Subs not used
Paul McMullan
Stephen Rooney
Phelim Duffin
Mattie Donnelly
Scott Walsh

== Management team ==
Manager: Davy Fitzgerald

== Managerial history ==
Dominic McKinley ?–1997

Seán McGuinness 1997–1998

Seán McNaughton 1999–2001

Tom McLean 2001

Dinny Cahill 2001–2005

Jim McKernan 2005–2006

Terence McNaughton & Dominic McKinley (2) 2006–2009

Dinny Cahill 2009–2011

Jerry Wallis 2011–2012

Jim Nelson 2012

Kevin Ryan 2012–2015

P. J. O'Mullan 2015–2016

Terence McNaughton (2) & Dominic McKinley (3) 2016–2018

Neal Peden 2018–2019

Darren Gleeson 2019–2024

Davy Fitzgerald 2024–2026

== Players ==
=== Records ===
==== Top scorers ====
Neil McManus

=== Awards ===
- All Stars:

Antrim has 5 All Stars, as of 1993.

1988: Ciaran Barr
1989: Dessie Donnelly, Olcan McFetridge
1991: Terence McNaughton
1993: Paul McKillen

- Champion 15:

denotes that a player also won Player of the Year for the year in question.

2006: Malachy Molloy, Paddy Richmond, Ciarán Herron
2016: Simon McCrory, Eoghan Campbell, Ciarán Clarke
2017: Paddy Burke
2020: Mattie Donnelly, Stephen Rooney, Gerard Walsh, Keelan Molloy, Niall McKenna, Conor McCann , Ciarán Clarke^{2nd}
2022: Ryan Elliott, Joe Maskey, Gerard Walsh^{2nd}, Eoghan Campbell, Keelan Molloy^{2nd}, Conal Cunning, Ciarán Clarke^{3rd}

== Team sponsorship ==
Antrim unveiled a sponsorship agreement with Fibrus in December 2022, projected to last five years.

== Honours ==
Official honours, with additions noted.

=== National ===
- All-Ireland Senior Hurling Championship
  - (silver) Runners-up (2): 1943, 1989
- All-Ireland Senior B Hurling Championship
  - (gold) Winners (3): 1978, 1981, 1982
  - (silver) Runners-up (1): 1974
- All-Ireland Intermediate Hurling Championship
  - (gold) Winners (1): 1970
- All-Ireland Junior Hurling Championship
  - (gold) Winners (1): 2002
  - (silver) Runners-up (2): 1959, 1963
- Joe McDonagh Cup
  - (gold) Winners (2): 2020, 2022
- Christy Ring Cup
  - (gold) Winners (1): 2006
  - (silver) Runners-up (2): 2016, 2017
- National Hurling League Division 2
  - (gold) Winners (4): 1956, 1970, 2003, 2020
- Oireachtas Cup
  - (gold) Winners (1): 1946
- All-Ireland Vocational Schools Championship
  - (gold) Winners (1): 1971

=== Provincial ===
- Ulster Senior Hurling Championship
  - (gold) Winners (58): 1900, 1901, 1903, 1904, 1905, 1907, 1909, 1910, 1911, 1913, 1916, 1924, 1925, 1926, 1927, 1928, 1929, 1930, 1931, 1933, 1934, 1935, 1936, 1937, 1938, 1939, 1940, 1943, 1944, 1945, 1946, 1947, 1948, 1949, 1989, 1990, 1991, 1993, 1994, 1996, 1998, 1999, 2002, 2003, 2004, 2005, 2006, 2007, 2008, 2009, 2010, 2011, 2012, 2013, 2014, 2015, 2016, 2017
  - (silver) Runners-up (11): 1902, 1906, 1914, 1915, 1923, 1932, 1941, 1992, 1995, 1997, 2000
- Walsh Cup
  - (gold) Winners (1): 2008
- Ulster Intermediate Hurling Championship
  - (gold) Winners (5): 1966, 1967, 1969, 1970, 1973
- Ulster Junior Hurling Championship
  - (gold) Winners (15): 1950, 1951, 1952, 1953, 1954, 1955, 1957, 1958, 1959, 1961, 1963, 1966, 1968, 1969, 2002
- Ulster Under-20 Hurling Championship
  - (gold) Winners (39): 1964, 1965, 1966, 1967, 1970, 1972, 1973, 1974, 1976, 1978, 1979, 1980, 1981, 1982, 1988, 1989, 1991, 1992, 1994, 1995, 1996, 1998, 1999, 2000, 2002, 2006, 2009, 2010, 2011, 2012, 2013, 2014, 2015, 2016, 2023, 2025, 2026
- Ulster Minor Hurling Championship
  - (gold) Winners (62): 1931, 1933, 1935–41, 1945–56, 1958–66, 1969, 1970, 1986, 1987, 1988, 1992, 1993, 1995–99, 2000, 2001, 2002, 2003, 2004, 2005, 2006, 2007, 2008, 2009, 2010, 2011, 2013, 2014, 2015, 2016, 2017, 2023, 2025, 2026
