= 2021 Joe McDonagh Cup =

Joe McDonagh Cup

- Dates: 26 June – 17 July 2021
- Teams: 6
- Champions: Westmeath (1st title); Cormac Boyle (captain); Shane O'Brien (manager)
- Runners-up: Kerry; Paudie O'Connor (captain); Fintan O'Connor (manager)
- Relegated: Kildare

Tournament statistics
- Matches played: 8
- Goals scored: 19 (2.38 per match)
- Points scored: 351 (43.88 per match)
- Top scorer(s): Jack Regan (1-36)

The 2021 Joe McDonagh Cup was the fourth staging of the Joe McDonagh Cup since its establishment by the Gaelic Athletic Association in 2018. The competition, which was delayed for a second successive year due to the impact of the COVID-19 pandemic on Gaelic games, began on 26 June 2021. The fixtures were published on 21 April 2021.

Antrim, winner of the 2020 final, were promoted to the Leinster Senior Hurling Championship, while there was no relegation to or from the competition. Down and Kildare entered the competition from the Christy Ring Cup.

On 17 July 2021, Westmeath won the Joe McDonagh Cup after a 2–28 to 1–24 win over Kerry in the final at Croke Park. It was their first ever cup title having previously lost two finals.

Meath's Jack Regan was the championship's top scorer with 1-36.

== Team changes ==
=== To Championship ===
Relegated from the All-Ireland Senior Hurling Championship

- None

Promoted from the Christy Ring Cup

- Down
- Kildare

=== From Championship ===
Promoted to the All-Ireland Senior Hurling Championship

- Antrim

Relegated to the Christy Ring Cup

- None

== Teams ==
=== General Information ===
County	Last Cup title	Last Provincial title	Last All-Ireland title	Position in 2020 Championship	Appearance
Carlow	2018	—	—	4th	3rd
Down	—	2001	—	Runners-up (Christy Ring Cup)	1st
Kerry	—	1891	1891	Runners-up	4th
Kildare	—	—	—	Champions (Christy Ring Cup)	1st
Meath	—	—	—	5th	3rd
Westmeath	—	—	—	3rd	4th

=== Personnel and kits ===
County	Manager	Captain(s)	Sponsor
Carlow	Tom Mullally	—	IT Carlow
Down	Ronan Sheehan	—	EOS IT Solutions
Kerry	Fintan O'Connor	Paudie O'Connor	Kerry Group
Kildare	David Herity	Brian Byrne	Brady Family Ham
Meath	Nick Weir	—	Glenveagh Properties
Westmeath	Shane O'Brien	Cormac Boyle	Renault

== Group stage ==
=== Group A ===
Pos	Team	Pld	W	D	L	SF	SA	Diff	Pts	Qualification
1	Westmeath	2	2	0	0	2-42	1-39	6	4	Advance to Knockout Stage
2	Carlow	2	1	0	1	2-40	3-39	-2	2	
3	Kildare	2	0	0	2	4-37	4-41	-4	0	Advance to Relegation playoff

==== Group A round 1 ====
26 June 2021 Round 1	Kildare	3-16 - 2-22	Carlow	St. Conleth's Park
	J Burke 2-2, J Sheridan 0-5f, B Byrne 0-4f, C Smith 1-0, D Flaherty, K Whelan, C Dowling, C Derivan, S Ryan 0-1 each.	Report	C Nolan 0-10 (0-6f), K McDonald 2-2, D English 0-3f, JM Nolan (0-1 sideline), J Nolan, J Doyle 0-2 each, R Coady 0-1.	Referee: C Cunning (Antrim)

==== Group A round 2 ====
3 July 2021 Round 2	Carlow	0-18 - 0-23	Westmeath	Netwatch Cullen Park
	C Nolan 0-11 (0-7f), Jon Nolan 0-3, T Joyce 0-2, JM Nolan & D English 0-1 each.	Report	N O’Brien and K Doyle 0-6 (0-4f) each, J Boyle 0-3, N Mitchell & C Doyle 0-2 each, A Clarke, A Cox, J Coll & D Clinton 0-1 each.	Referee: R McGann (Antrim)

==== Group A round 3 ====
10 July 2021 Round 3	Westmeath	2-19 - 1-21	Kildare	TEG Cusack Park
	K Doyle 0-8 (0-4f), N O’Brien 0-5 (0-4f), N Mitchell 1-1, C Doyle 1-0, J Coll 0-2, R Greville, D Glennon & D McNicholas 0-1 each.	Report	J Sheridan 1-5 (0-4f), B Byrne 0-6 (0-4f, 0-1 65), P Divilly 0-3, J Burke & D Slattery 0-2 each, C Dowling, K Whelan & J Byrne 0-1 each.	Referee: C McAllister (Cork)

=== Group B ===
Pos	Team	Pld	W	D	L	SF	SA	Diff	Pts	Qualification
1	Kerry	2	1	0	1	3-45	1-49	2	2	Advance to Knockout Stage
2	Down	2	1	0	1	2-48	4-40	2	2	
3	Meath	2	1	0	1	2-44	2-28	-4	2	Advance to Relegation playoff

==== Group B round 1 ====
26 June 2021 Round 1	Kerry	2-24 - 1-21	Down	Austin Stack Park
	S Conway ( 1-8, 0-4F, 0-1 65), S Nolan (0-4, 0-1F)), M Boyle, P Boyle (0-4 each), B Mahony ( 0-3), C Hussey (1-0), F OSullivan ( 0-1)	Report	D Sands (1-2), P Sheehan (0-5, 0-4F), O McManus (0-4F), P Óg McCrickard (0-3), D Hughes ( 0-2), C Woods (0-1 65), R McCusker, T Prender, P Savage, and E Sands (0-1 each)	Referee: C McAllister (Cork)

==== Group B round 2 ====
3 July 2021 Round 2	Down	1-27 - 2-16	Meath	McKenna Park
	P Sheehan 0-11, nine frees; R McClusker 1-1; T Prenter 0-3; D Sands 0-2; E Sands 0-2; P Savage 0-2; L Savage 0-1; C Egan 0-1; R Costello 0-1; J Doran 0-1, C Woods 0-1; O MacManus 0-1.	Report	J Regan 1-8, five frees; A Douglas 1-0; A Gannon 0-2; D Kelly 0-2; J Toher 0-2; I Bermingham 0-1; P Conneely 0-1.	Referee: P Murphy (Carlow)

==== Group B round 3 ====
10 July 2021 Round 3	Meath	0-28 - 1-21	Kerry	Páirc Tailteann
	J Regan 0-11 (0-5f, 0-2 65, 0-1 sideline), P Conneely 0-6, A Douglas 0-3, P O'Hanrahan 0-2, S Quigley 0-2, I Birmingham 0-1, J Toher 0-1, A Gannon 0-1, M O'Sullivan 0-1.	Report	S Conway 0-10 (0-8f, 0-1 65), C Hussey 1-1, P Boyle 0-4 (0-1f), S Nolan 0-2, D Collins 0-1, M Boyle 0-1, M O'Connor 0-1, M Leane 0-1.	Referee: S Hynes (Galway)

== Knockout stage ==
=== Final ===
17 July 2021 Final	Westmeath	2-28 - 1-24	Kerry	Croke Park
	N Mitchell 1-4, K Doyle 0-6 (3fs), D Glennon 0-5, C Doyle 1-2, R Greville 0-4, N O’Brien (1f), A Clarke 0-2 each, J Boyle, A Craig, D McNicholas (f) 0-1 each.	Report	P Boyle 0-7 (3fs), M Boyle 1-3, S Conway 0-4 (2fs, 1 sideline), C Hussey 0-3, S Nolan, B O’Mahony 0-2 each, J Diggins, C O’Keeffe, D Collins 0-1 each.	Referee: S Cleere (Kilkenny)

Westmeath are promoted to the 2022 All-Ireland Senior Hurling Championship.

== Relegation Playoff ==
17 July 2021 Playoff	Kildare	1-15 - 0-28	Meath	Parnell Park
	J Sheridan 1-5 (4 frees), B Byrne 0-2 (65, 1 free), P Divilly 0-2, J Travers 0-2, J Byrne 0-1 Conor Dowling 0-1, S Ryan 0-1, G Keegan 0-1.	Report	J Regan 0-17 (13 frees), E Ó Donnchadha 0-4, S Morris 0-2, J Toher 0-2, M O’Sullivan 0-2, A Gannon 0-1.	Referee: C Cunning (Antrim)

Kildare are relegated to the 2022 Christy Ring Cup.

== Stadia and locations ==
County	Location	Province	Stadium	Capacity
Carlow	Carlow	Leinster	Netwatch Cullen Park	21,000
Down	Newry	Ulster	Páirc Esler	20,000
Kerry	Tralee	Munster	Austin Stack Park	12,000
Kildare	Newbridge	Leinster	St. Conleth's Park	8,200
Meath	Navan	Leinster	Páirc Tailteann	17,000
Westmeath	Mullingar	Leinster	Cusack Park	11,000

== Statistics ==
=== Top scorers ===
==== Top scorer overall ====
Rank	Player	Club	Tally	Total	Matches	Average
1	Jack Regan	Meath	1-36	39	3	13.00
2	Shane Conway	Kerry	1-22	25	3	8.33
3	Jack Sheridan	Kildare	2-18	24	3	8.00
4	Chris Nolan	Carlow	0-21	21	2	10.50
5	Killian Doyle	Westmeath	0-20	20	3	6.66
6	Paul Sheehan	Down	0-16	16	2	8.00
7	Pádraig Boyle	Kerry	0-15	15	3	4.00
8	Niall Mitchell	Westmeath	2-07	13	3	4.33
8	Niall O'Brien	Westmeath	0-13	13	3	4.33
10	Brian Byrne	Kildare	0-12	12	3	4.00

==== In a single game ====
Rank	Player	Club	Tally	Total	Opposition
1	Jack Regan	Meath	0-17	17	Kildare
2	Jack Regan	Meath	1-08	11	Down
2	Jack Regan	Meath	0-11	11	Kerry
2	Shane Conway	Kerry	1-08	11	Down
2	Chris Nolan	Carlow	0-11	11	Westmeath
2	Paul Sheehan	Down	0-11	11	Meath
7	Chris Nolan	Carlow	0-10	10	Kildare
7	Shane Conway	Kerry	0-10	10	Meath
9	Kevin McDonald	Carlow	2-02	8	Kildare
9	James Burke	Kildare	2-02	8	Carlow
9	Jack Sheridan	Kildare	1-05	8	Westmeath
9	Jack Sheridan	Kildare	1-05	8	Kildare
9	Killian Doyle	Westmeath	0-08	8	Kildare

=== Scoring Events ===
- Widest winning margin: 10 points
  - Kildare 1-15 - 0-28 Meath (Relegation Playoff)
- Most goals in a match: 5
  - Kildare 3-16 - 2-22 Carlow (Round 1A)
- Most points in a match: 52
  - Westmeath 2-28 - 1-24 Kerry (Final)
- Most goals by one team in a match: 3
  - Kildare 3-16 - 2-22 Carlow (Round 1A)
- Most points by one team in a match: 28
  - Meath 0-28 - 1-21 Kerry (Round 3B)
  - Westmeath 2-28 - 1-24 Kerry (Final)
  - Kildare 1-15 - 0-28 Meath (Relegation Playoff)
- Highest aggregate score: 61 points
  - Westmeath 2-28 - 1-24 Kerry (Final)
- Lowest aggregate score: 41 points
  - Carlow 0-18 - 0-23 Westmeath (Round 1B)

== Miscellaneous ==
- Westmeath's Davey Glennon became the first player to win both Joe McDonagh Cup and All-Ireland Championship winners' medals, having claimed the latter with Galway in 2017.
- Westmeath won their 1st championship in 11 years since winning the 2010 Christy Ring Cup.
- Down become only the second ever Ulster team to compete in the Joe McDonagh Cup.
- First-time Joe McDonagh Cup meetings:
  - Kildare v Carlow (Round 1)
  - Kerry v Down (Round 2)
  - Down v Meath (Round 3)
  - Westmeath v Kildare (Round 3)
  - Kildare v Meath (Relegation Playoff)
