= 2020 Joe McDonagh Cup final =

2020 Joe McDonagh Cup Final
- Event: 2020 Joe McDonagh Cup
Antrim	Kerry
0–22	1–17
- Date: 13 December 2020
- Venue: Croke Park, Dublin
- Referee: Liam Gordon (Galway)
- Attendance: 0 (Note: The game was played behind closed doors due to the impact of the COVID-19 pandemic on Gaelic games.)
- Weather: Dry

The 2020 Joe McDonagh Cup Final was played at Croke Park in Dublin on 13 December 2020. It was contested by Antrim and Kerry.

The game took place before the 2020 All-Ireland Senior Hurling Championship Final. Antrim won the competition for the first time and were thus promoted to the 2021 All-Ireland Senior Hurling Championship (the sport's top flight).

The match was televised live on RTÉ2 as part of The Sunday Game, presented by Joanne Cantwell from Croke Park, with commentary from Ger Canning.

Darren Gleeson was manager. Conor McCann was captain.

Belfast City Hall lit up in yellow on 24 January 2021 in commemoration of Antrim's win.

== Match details ==
13 December 2020

Antrim	0–22 – 1–17	Kerry
C Clarke (0-11, 0-8 frees); N McManus (0-4, 0-2 ‘65s, 0-1 free); N McKenna, C Gunning (0-2 each); J McNaughton, C McCann, M Bradley (0-1 each).	Report	S Conway (0-9, 0-8 frees); M Boyle (1-0); M O’Leary, D Collins (0-2 each); P O’Connor, C Harty, P Boyle, B O’Leary (0-1 each).

Croke Park, Dublin
Referee: Liam Gordon (Galway)

Antrim	Kerry

?	Ryan Elliott
?	Phelim Duffin
?	Matthew Donnelly
?	Stephen Rooney
?	Joe Maskey
?	Paddy Burke
?	Gerard Walsh
?	Eoghan Campbell
?	Keelan Molloy
?	Niall McKenna
?	James McNaughton
?	Michael Bradley
?	Daniel McCloskey
?	Conor McCann (c)
?	Ciarán Clarke
Substitutes:
?	Conal Cunning for McCloskey (h/t)
?	Neil McManus for Molloy (45 mins)
?	Donal Nugent for McCann (45 mins)
?	Conor Johnston for Bradley (64 mins)
?	Aodhan O'Brien for McKenna (70 mins)
Manager:
Darren Gleeson

?	John B. O'Halloran
?	Bryan Murphy
?	Tomas O'Connor
?	Eric Leen
?	Jason Diggins
?	Fionán Mackessy
?	Michael Leane
?	Brandon Barrett
?	Paudie O'Connor
?	Michael O'Leary
?	Shane Nolan
?	Shane Conway
?	Daniel Collins
?	Mikey Boyle
?	Maurice O'Connor
Substitutes:
?	Barry O'Mahony for M. O'Connor (42 mins)
?	Padraig Boyle for P. O'Connor (49 mins)
?	Colm Harty for M. Boyle (55 mins)
?	Brendan O'Leary for Barrett (61 mins)
Manager:
Fintan O'Connor

Man of the Match:
?
