= Niall McKenna =

Irish hurler

Personal information
- Native name: Niall Mac Cionaoith (Irish)
- Born: 1994 (age 31–32) Belfast, Northern Ireland

Sport
- Sport: Hurling
- Position: Right wing-forward
Club
- Years: Club
- Patrick Sarsfields
Club titles
- Antrim titles: 0
Inter-county
- Years: County
- 2013-2017; 2019- 2018: Antrim; Warwickshire
Inter-county titles
- Ulster titles: 2
- All-Irelands: 0
- NHL: 0
- All Stars: 0

Niall McKenna (born 1994) is a hurler from Northern Ireland who plays for Antrim Championship club Patrick Sarsfields and at inter-county level with the Antrim senior hurling team. He usually lines out as a wing-forward.

== Career ==
A member of the Patrick Sarsfields club in Belfast, McKenna was part of the club's 2017 County Intermediate Championship-winning team. He first came to prominence on the inter-county scene with the Antrim minor team that won the Ulster Minor Championship title in 2011. McKenna subsequently won three consecutive Ulster Championships with the under-21 team and was at wing-forward for the 2013 All-Ireland U21 final defeat by Wexford. As a member of the Antrim senior hurling team he has won two Ulster Championship titles, a National League Division 2A title and a Joe McDonagh Cup title. McKenna also spent a season lining out with Warwickshire in th2 Nicky Rackard Cup.

== Honours ==
Patrick Sarsfields

- Antrim Intermediate Hurling Championship: 2017

Antrim

- Ulster Senior Hurling Championship: 2013, 2015
- Joe McDonagh Cup: 2020
- National Hurling League Division 2A: 2017
- Ulster Under-21 Hurling Championship: 2013, 2014, 2015
- Ulster Minor Hurling Championship: 2011
