= James McInerney =

James McInerney may refer to:

- James McInerney (hurler), Irish hurler
- James McInerney (Australian politician) (1844–1912), member of the New South Wales Legislative Council
- James McInerney (rugby union) (born 1959), Australian rugby player
- James E. McInerney Jr. (1930-2014), United States Air Force general
- James P. McInerney (1859–1912), Canadian politician in the Legislative Assembly of New Brunswick
- James O. McInerney (born 1969), Irish-born microbiologist, computational evolutionary biologist and professor
- James J. McInerney, American lawyer, judge, and politician from New York

== See also ==
- James McInerny, English cricketer
