= Gerard Walsh =

Irish hurler

Personal information
- Native name: Gearóid Breathnach (Irish)
- Born: 14 March 1997 (age 29) Belfast, Northern Ireland
- Occupation: Student

Sport
- Sport: Hurling
- Position: Full-back
Club
- Years: Club
- O'Donovan Rossa
Club titles
- Antrim titles: 0
College
- Years: College
- Ulster University
College titles
- Fitzgibbon titles: 0
Inter-county
- Years: County
- 2018-present: Antrim
Inter-county titles
- Leinster titles: 0
- All-Irelands: 0
- NHL: 0
- All Stars: 0

Gerard Walsh (born 14 March 1997) is an Irish hurler who plays for Antrim Championship club O'Donovan Rossa and at inter-county level with the Antrim senior hurling team. He usually lines out as a full-back.

== Career ==
A member of the O'Donovan Rossa club, Walsh first came to prominence with the club's senior team that won the 2015 All-Ireland Intermediate Club Championship title after a defeat of Kilburn Gaels. He made his first appearance on the inter-county scene as a member of the Antrim minor team that won consecutive Ulster Minor Championship titles in 2014 and 2015 before winning an Ulster Under-21 Championship title in 2016. Walsh made his debut with the Antrim senior hurling team during the 2018 Walsh Cup and lined out at wing-back for their 2020 Joe McDonagh Cup success.

== Honours ==
O'Donovan Rossa

- All-Ireland Intermediate Club Hurling Championship: 2015
- Ulster Intermediate Club Hurling Championship: 2014
- Antrim Intermediate Hurling Championship: 2014

Antrim

- Joe McDonagh Cup: 2020
- Ulster Under-21 Hurling Championship: 2016
- Ulster Minor Hurling Championship: 2014, 2015
