= Paddy Burke (hurler) =

Irish hurler

Personal information
- Native name: Pádraig de Búrca (Irish)
- Born: 1995 (age 30–31) Belfast, Northern Ireland
- Occupation: Software engineer

Sport
- Sport: Hurling
- Position: Centre-back
Club
- Years: Club
- Ruairí Óg
Club titles
- Antrim titles: 3
- Ulster titles: 2
College
- Years: College
- 2014-2019: Ulster University
College titles
- Fitzgibbon titles: 0
Inter-county
- Years: County
- 2015-present: Antrim
Inter-county titles
- Ulster titles: 3
- All-Irelands: 0
- NHL: 0
- All Stars: 0

Patrick Burke (born 1995) is an Irish hurler who plays for Antrim Senior Championship club Ruairí Óg and at inter-county level as vice-captain of the Antrim senior hurling team. He usually lines out as a centre-back.

== Career ==
A member of the Ruairí Óg club, Burke joined the club's senior team in 2012. Since then he has won two Ulster Club Championship titles as well as three County Championship titles. Burke made his first appearance on the inter-county scene as a member of the Antrim minor team that won an Ulster Minor Championship title in 2013, before winning three successive Ulster Under-21 Championship titles. Burke made his debut with the Antrim senior hurling team in 2015. Since then he has won one Joe McDonagh Cup title, three successive Ulster Championship titles and two National League Division 2A titles.

== Honours ==
Ruairí Óg

- Ulster Senior Club Hurling Championship: 2015, 2018
- Antrim Senior Hurling Championship: 2014, 2015, 2018

Antrim

- Ulster Senior Hurling Championship: 2015, 2016, 2017
- Joe McDonagh Cup: 2020
- National Hurling League Division 2A: 2017, 2020
- Ulster Under-21 Hurling Championship: 2014, 2015, 2016
- Ulster Minor Hurling Championship: 2013
