= All-Ireland Poc Fada Championship =

Annual Gaelic games event

The All-Ireland Poc Fada Hurling & Camogie Championships is an annual tournament testing the skills of Ireland's best hurlers and camogie players. Poc Fada is Irish for "long puck". The championships are sponsored by Martin Donnelly (who has been a sponsor since 1996).

The All Ireland Poc Fada Finals have taken place on the Saturday of the Irish August Public Holiday each year since 2005. In 2018 the All Ireland Hurling Championship was restructured, with the 2019 Finals taking place on Saturday 3 August. The finals now take place on the August Bank Holiday Monday.

The Senior Men's Hurling Poc Fada Final starts at An Fhána Mór, Annaverna, County Louth. Competitors must puck (hit) a sliotar with a hurley to the top of Annaverna Mountain (An Céide), and onwards to Carn an Mhadaidh. After a short break they continue down to An Gabhlán, before finishing back at the start of the course. The whole course measures 5 kilometres (3.1 mi).

== Organisation Structure ==
=== The National Poc Fada Committee ===
The National Poc Fada Committee is a body appointed by the GAA and Camogie President's to oversee the planning and staging of the prestigious All-Ireland Poc Fada Championship. This committee works alongside the local organizing committees in Louth (who handle logistics on Annaverna Mountain) to ensure the competition runs smoothly.

The 2025 National Poc Fada Committee is Chairperson Tom Ryan, Secretary Cieran Kearney, P.R.O. Dave Murray, Administrator Darragh Cox, Ulster Rep Kieran Farmer, Munster Rep Joe Carton, Connacht Rep Anthony Flaherty, Camogie Rep Lauren Solon, Local Louth & Armagh Committee Rep's Paul Comiskey and Pat McGinn

=== Louth/Armagh Poc Fada Committee 2025 ===
Honorary President's Pat Harnett & Damien Callan. Chairperson Paul Cumiskey, Secretary Aidan Quinn, Event Safety Officer Pat Hamilton, Event Controller Graham Lowndes. Committee Members Josie Maguire, David Morrissey, Charlie Geoghegan, Margaret Dignam, Shay Larkin, Paul Callan, Pat McGinn, Fra Kieran, Cormac O’Donoghue, Mark McAllister.

== Competitions ==
=== Senior Men's Final: Corn Setanta (The Setanta Cup) ===
The 12 competitors competing in this category qualify are the four provincial champions, the four provincial runners-up, the current champion, 2 invitationals places and the local Louth GAA representative. In the past competitors have come from USA, Europe and South Africa.

"Corn Setanta ("the sliotar cup)" is awarded to the player who takes the lowest number of pucks to complete the course. Ties are broken by the distance by which the player's last puck crosses the finish line.

=== Senior Hurling Final: The First Poc (The Paul Ward Cup) ===
The distance of the first poc taken by each of the senior men is recorded. The player who has the longest first poc is awarded the Paul Ward Cup. The Paul Ward Cup is to honour the memory of committee member Mr Paul Ward, who died in 2021.

=== Comórtas Beirte (Pairs) – Corn Cuailgne (The Cooley Cup) and Corn Na Craoibhe Rua (The Red Branch Cup) ===
Shared between the pairing drawn prior to the competition as the pair returning the fewest combined pucks for the course. Record holders still to be clarified! This competition has now been discontinued.

=== Senior Camogie Final – (The Camogie Poc Fada Cup) ===
There are six competitors in the Senior Camogie Final. The current champion, the 4 current provincial champions and an invitational nominee from An Cumann Camógaíochta.

=== The U16 Boys Final – Corn Sheáin Óg Mhic Sheáin (The Young John McShane Cup) ===
There are currently only 4 participants in this event, 1 from each of the 4 provincial qualifiers. If the situation occurs where the winner of the All Ireland final is eligible to compete at the same age group the following year he will be asked to return and defend his All Ireland title. To date this has happened three times when the 2011 Under 16 champion (Cillian Kiely of Offaly) successfully retained the All Ireland title in 2012. This feat was repeated by his brother Cathal, the 2016 champion, who also retained his title in 2017. Finally, Conor Raleigh from Westmeath completed back to back wins in 2025 and 2026.

== History ==
The tournament was founded in 1960 by Fr. Pól Mac Sheáin and the Naomh Moninne club based in Fatima, Dundalk, Louth, with the first All Ireland event taking place in 1961, Limerick man Vincent Godfrey was the first winner, out of 16 hurlers invited. The competition went off the calendar after 1969 before returning in 1981 with 12 competitors.

The concept of the competition originates in the Irish legend of "Táin Bó Cuailgne" when Cúchulainn, who as the boy Setanta set out from his home at Dún Dealgan to the King's court at Emain Macha hitting his sliotar before him and running ahead to catch it as he travelled over the Cooley Mountains.

In 2001 the Poc Fada was held at Dundalk Stadium (Dundalk Racecourse) due to foot-and-mouth disease on the Cooley Peninsula, doing two laps of the circuit (2 miles 880 yards / 4,023 metres). The 2005 tournament was won by Albert Shanahan of Limerick, with international soccer player Niall Quinn (who played for Dublin in the 1983 All-Ireland Minor final) also competing.

Almost all of the winners have been from traditional hurling counties, but Dinny Donnelly (Meath), Gerry Goodwin (Tyrone), Colin Byrne (Wicklow), Paul Dunne (Louth), Mary Henry (Westmeath), 2009 champion Gerry Fallon (Roscommon) and 2010 champion Graham Clarke (Down) have been exceptions. The record currently stands at 48 pucks (an average of 104 metres per puck), achieved by Brendan Cummins (Tipperary) in 2004. The current record for the Camogie course is held by Patricia Jackman of Waterford when in 2013 she completed the course in 27 pocs and 7 metres (over the end line). Traditionally the most successful competitors have generally been goalkeepers, owing to the need for goalkeepers to puck the ball far up the field in a game of hurling but increasingly there are more "outfield" Hurlers and Camogs out qualifying their goalkeeping contemporaries at county and provincial final level.

=== Poc Fada Most Titles ===
Name	County	Number of Wins	Years
Brendan Cummins	Tipperary	9	2004, 2006–08, 2011–15
Ger Cunningham	Cork	7	1984–90
Patricia Jackman	Waterford	7	2009–15
Cillian Kiely	Offaly	2 Snr and 2 U16	Under 16 2011-12. Senior 2018-19
Molly Lynch	Cork	6 Snr and 1 U16	Under 16 2017. Senior 2021-26

=== Roll of Honour ===
Year	Winner	County	Number of pucks
1961	Vincent Godfrey	Limerick	52
1962	Ollie Walsh	Kilkenny	67
1963	Ollie Walsh; Tom Geary; Dinny Donnelly	Kilkenny; Waterford; Meath	70
1964	Oliver Gough	Kilkenny	
1965	Denis Murphy	Cork	
1966	Finbar O'Neill	Cork	
1967	Finbar O'Neill	Cork	
1968	Finbar O'Neill	Cork	
1969	Liam Tobin	Waterford	
1970–80	Eleven-year hiatus		
1981	Pat Hartigan	Limerick	
1982	Gerry Goodwin	Tyrone	
1983	Pat Hartigan	Limerick	
1984	Ger Cunningham	Cork	
1985	Ger Cunningham	Cork	
1986	Ger Cunningham	Cork	
1987	Ger Cunningham	Cork	
1988	Ger Cunningham	Cork	
1989	Ger Cunningham	Cork	
1990	Ger Cunningham	Cork	
1991	Tommy Quaid	Limerick	
1992	Albert Kelly	Offaly	
1993	Albert Kelly	Offaly	
1994	Michael Shaughnessy	Galway	
1995	Michael Shaughnessy	Galway	
1996	Michael Shaughnessy	Galway	
1997	Colin Byrne	Wicklow	
1998	Albert Kelly	Offaly	
1999	Davy Fitzgerald	Clare	
2000	Colin Byrne	Wicklow	50
2001	Albert Shanahan	Limerick	49 §
2002	Davy Fitzgerald	Clare	52
2003	Paul Dunne	Louth	54
2004	Brendan Cummins	Tipperary	48
2005	Albert Shanahan	Limerick	58
2006	Brendan Cummins	Tipperary	52
2007	Brendan Cummins	Tipperary	49
2008	Brendan Cummins	Tipperary	49
2009	Gerry Fallon	Roscommon	60 (strong wind)
2010	Graham Clarke	Down	51
2011	Brendan Cummins	Tipperary	50
2012	Brendan Cummins	Tipperary	39 §
2013	Brendan Cummins	Tipperary	51
2014	Brendan Cummins	Tipperary	54
2015	Brendan Cummins	Tipperary	57
2016	James McInerney	Clare	50
2017	Tadhg Haran	Galway	51
2018	Cillian Kiely	Offaly	48
2019	Cillian Kiely	Offaly	49
2020	Cancelled due to COVID-19 pandemic		
2021	Colin Ryan	Limerick	21 §
2022	Killian Phelan	Kilkenny	49
2023	Fionan Mackessy	Kerry	48
2024	Fionan Mackessy	Kerry/Kilkenny	40 Pucks + 73.4m §
2025	Colin Ryan	Limerick	25 Pucks + 60.7 m §
2026	Colin Ryan	Limerick	51 Pucks + 54 m §

§ short course 2001 – took place at the Dundalk Racecourse (two and a half-mile) due to foot-and-mouth disease. § Less mountainous course 2012 – The Senior Men's competition was played over the "Lower" course due to the prevailing weather conditions on Finals' Day. They started at the 2.14 km (1.33 mi) course start line pucking to "An Gábhlan" and back to the start line where they turned and repeated the course for a second time. The course distance was 4.24 km (2.63 mi). § short course 2021 – the shorter Camogie/Juvenile course was used due to heavy fog on the mountains. § Section 2 was not used due to high winds. § short course 2025 - the second and third sections were removed due to adverse weather (High Winds)

==== Camogie Poc Fada since 2004 ====
Uses a shorter course of just 2 stages from "An Fhana Mór" to "An Gabhlan" and back, a distance of 2.14 km (1.33 miles). The current record for the Camogie course is held by Patricia Jackman of Waterford when in 2013 she completed the course in 27 pocs and 7 metres (over the end line). Lyndsey Condell of Carlow's record stood from 2008 until 2013 when she completed the course in 28 pocs and 67 metres (over the end line) – Scoresheet not available online but has been verified. Catriona Daly (Galway) finishing 2nd to Patricia in 2013 with 28 pocs and 17.5m is in third place. Mary Henry of Westmeath in fourth place with 28 pocs and 4 metres (over the end line) in 2006.

Year	Winner	County	Number of pucks
2004	Stephanie Gannon	Galway	32
2005	Denise Lynch	Clare	30
2006	Mary Henry	Westmeath	28 + 4m
2007	Lyndsey Condell	Carlow	30
2008	Lyndsey Condell	Carlow	
2009	Patricia Jackman	Waterford	29
2010	Patricia Jackman	Waterford	28
2011	Patricia Jackman	Waterford	28
2012	Patricia Jackman	Waterford	29
2013	Patricia Jackman	Waterford	27
2014	Patricia Jackman	Waterford	29
2015	Patricia Jackman	Waterford	27
2016	Aoife Murray	Cork	27
2017	Susan Earner	Galway	26 pocs 10 m
2018	Susan Earner	Galway	24
2019	Catriona Daly	Galway	24
2020	Cancelled due to COVID-19 pandemic		
2021	Molly Lynch	Cork	28
2022	Molly Lynch	Cork	25
2023	Molly Lynch	Cork	24
2024	Molly Lynch	Cork	25 Pucks + 39.8m
2025	Molly Lynch	Cork	27 Pucks + 37m
2026	Molly Lynch	Cork	26 Pucks + 62.3m

==== Boys (Under 16) ====
Uses the same course as the Camogie finalists.

Year	Winner	County	Number of pucks
2007	Aaron Murphy	Limerick	24
2008	Eamon Murphy	Waterford	26
2009	Noel Fallon	Roscommon	25
2010	Owen Treacy	Galway	25
2011	Cillian Kiely	Offaly	24
2012	Cillian Kiely	Offaly	22
2013	Jack Coyne	Galway	25
2014	Donal McKernan	Antrim	26
2015	Shaun Murray	Waterford	25
2016	Cathal Kiely	Offaly	22
2017	Cathal Kiely	Offaly	22
2018	Kyle Shelly	Tipperary	22
2019	Patrick Burke	Galway	24
2020	Cancelled due to COVID-19 pandemic		
2021	Cancelled due to COVID-19 pandemic		
2022	Darragh Smith	Westmeath	24
2023	Sean Kelly	Galway	24
2024	Matthew O’Sullivan	Kerry	24 Pucks + 55.8 m
2025	Conor Raleigh	Westmeath	25 Pucks + 34 m
2026	Conor Raleigh	Westmeath	22 Pucks

==== Girls U16 Camogie Poc Fada since 2015 ====
Uses the same course as the Camogie finalists.

Year	Winner	County	Number of pucks
2015	Sarah Healy	Galway	32
2016	Sarah Healy	Galway	28
2017	Molly Lynch	Cork	31
2018	Maeve Muldoon	Galway	27
2019	Katie Gilchrist	Galway	27
2020	Cancelled due to COVID-19 pandemic		
2021	Cancelled due to COVID-19 pandemic		
2022	Lucy Lynch	Cork	28
2023	Tiarná Kelly	Derry	29
2024	Ona Kennedy	Kilkenny	31 Pucks + 12.8m
2025	Siofra Ginty	Offaly	33 Pucks + 22.5 m
2026	Eloise McConn	Kildare	32 Pucks + 59.3 m
