= Joe Maskey =

Irish hurler

Personal information
- Native name: Seosamh Ó Meascaigh (Irish)
- Born: 1997 (age 28–29) Glengormley, County Antrim, Northern Ireland
- Occupation: Pastry chef
- Height: 6 ft 5 in (196 cm)

Sport
- Sport: Hurling
- Position: Left wing-back
Club
- Years: Club
- St. Enda's
Club titles
- Antrim titles: 0
Inter-county
- Years: County
- 2017-present: Antrim
Inter-county titles
- Ulster titles: 1
- All-Irelands: 0
- NHL: 0
- All Stars: 0

Joseph Maskey (born 1998) is an Irish hurler who plays for Antrim Championship club St. Enda's and at inter-county level with the Antrim senior hurling team. He usually lines out as a wing-back.

== Career ==
A dual player with the St. Enda's club in Glengormley, Maskey was a key member of the club's senior Gaelic football team that lost the 2019 All-Ireland Intermediate Club Football final to Kilcummin. He has also won Ulster Club Championship titles in both codes. Maskey made his first appearance on the inter-county scene as a member of the Antrim minor team that won the Ulster Minor Championship titles in 2015, before later winning an Ulster Under-21 Championship title in 2016. He made his debut with the Antrim senior hurling team in 2017. Since then he has won one Joe McDonagh Cup title, an Ulster Championship title and two National League Division 2A titles.

== Honours ==
St. Enda's

- Ulster Intermediate Club Hurling Championship: 2019
- Ulster Intermediate Club Football Championship: 2018
- Antrim Intermediate Hurling Championship: 2019
- Antrim Intermediate Football Championship: 2018

Antrim

- Ulster Senior Hurling Championship: 2017
- Joe McDonagh Cup: 2020
- National Hurling League Division 2A: 2017, 2020
- Ulster Under-21 Hurling Championship: 2016
- Ulster Minor Hurling Championship: 2015
