= Phelim Duffin =

Irish hurler

Personal information
- Native name: Féilim Ó Duifinn (Irish)
- Born: September 1995 (age 31) Dunloy, County Antrim, Northern Ireland
- Occupation: Haulage contractor

Sport
- Sport: Hurling
- Position: Right corner-back
Club
- Years: Club
- Dunloy
Club titles
- Antrim titles: 3
Inter-county
- Years: County
- 2018-present: Antrim
Inter-county titles
- Leinster titles: 0
- All-Irelands: 0
- NHL: 0
- All Stars: 0

Phelim Duffin (born September 1995) is an Irish hurler who plays for Antrim Senior Championship club Dunloy and at inter-county level with the Antrim senior hurling team. He usually lines out as a wing-forward.

== Career ==
A member of the Dunloy club, Cunning first came to prominence with the club's senior team that won County Championship titles in 2017, 2019 and 2020. He made his first appearance on the inter-county scene as a member of the Antrim senior hurling team during the 2019 Kehoe Cup and has since won a Joe McDonagh Cup title.

== Honours ==
Dunloy

- Antrim Senior Hurling Championship: 2017, 2019, 2020

Antrim

- Joe McDonagh Cup: 2020
