= Mattie Donnelly =

Mattie Donnelly may refer to:

- Mattie Donnelly (hurler), Irish hurler
- Mattie Donnelly (Gaelic footballer), Irish Gaelic footballer
