= Graham Clarke (hurler) =

Down hurling goalkeeper

Personal information
- Born: 27 March 1974 (age 52) Ballygalget, County Down
- Height: 5 ft 8 in (173 cm)

Sport
- Sport: Hurling
- Position: Goalkeeper
Club
- Years: Club
- 1990–2017: Ballygalget
Club titles
- Down titles: 10
- Ulster titles: 2
- All-Ireland Titles: 0
Inter-county
- Years: County
- 1995–2012: Down
Inter-county titles
- Ulster titles: 2
- All-Irelands: 0
- NHL: 1

Graham Clarke (born 27 March 1974) is an Irish sportsman. He plays hurling with his local club Ballygalget and was a member of the Down senior county team from 1993 to 2012.

== Playing career ==
=== Club ===
Born in Ballygalget, County Down, Clarke plays his hurling with his local club in Ballygalget, and first came to prominence on the club's minor team in the late 1980s. He was goalkeeper on the team that captured four consecutive county championship titles in that grade. Clarke later joined the club's senior team and became the first-choice goalkeeper at the age of sixteen. He won his first county senior championship winners' medal in 1990, following a defeat of Ballycran. Clarke later lined out in the Ulster Club SHC final; however, Dunloy won by 0–17 to 2–4.

Two years later in 1992, Clarke added a second senior county title to his collection. Ballygalget, however, were subsequently defeated by Cushendall in the Ulster Club SHC final.

Clarke's side went into decline following this defeat as Ballygalget lost the next four county championship finals. The team bounced back in 1997 and a defeat of Portaferry gave Clarke a third county winners' medal at senior level. Ballygalget made it two-in-a-row in 1998, before lining out in another provincial club decider. Ballycastle McQuillan's provided the opposition on that occasion; however, after a draw and an exciting replay that featured extra-time, Ballygalget were the victors by 1–14 to 1–12. It was Clarke's first Ulster Club SHC club winners' medal. Ballygalget were subsequently defeated by Rathnure in the All-Ireland Club SHC semi-final.

Ballygalget made it three county titles in-a-row in 1999, with Clarke adding a fifth county winners' medal to his collection. His club subsequently surrendered their Ulster club title to Cushendall.

After a period out of the limelight Ballygalget returned in 2003, with Clarke collecting a sixth county winners' medal. It was the first of another three-in-a-row for Ballygalget and for Clarke. The third of these victories was subsequently converted into a second Ulster Club SHC title for Clarke. The club was later defeated in the All-Ireland Club SHC semi-final.

In 2008, Clarke won his ninth county senior championship winners' medal following an eleven-point win over Portaferry.

In 2010, Clarke won his tenth county championship, beating Ballycrane 3-19 0–12.

=== Inter-county ===
Clarke first came to prominence on the inter-county scene as a member of the Down minor hurling team in the late 1980s. He was only fifteen years-old when he captured an Ulster Minor Hurling Championship title in 1989, following a defeat in a replay of Antrim. Down were subsequently defeated in the All-Ireland semi-final.

Clarke made his senior debut for Down in a challenge game against Meath in 1993. It would be another few years before he became Down's first-choice goalkeeper for the championship. Following Noel Keith's retirement Clarke made his senior championship debut in 1997. That year he won an Ulster Senior Hurling Championship (SHC) title following a 3–14 to 0–19 defeat of Antrim. Down, however, were subsequently beaten by Tipperary in the All-Ireland SHC semi-final.

The next few years proved to an unhappy time for Down's hurling team as Antrim and Derry reclaimed their status as the standard-bearers in the provincial championship. Clarke lined out in further Ulster SHC finals in 2001, 2002, 2004, 2005, 2008 and 2008; however, he ended up on the losing side on all six occasions.

In 2005, a restructuring of the championship led to Down participating in the Christy Ring Cup. Clarke's side reached the final of the competition in their debut year. Westmeath provided the opposition on that occasion; however, Down were defeated by 1–23 to 2–18. The team failed to build on this in subsequent years, and in 2009 lost to Carlow.

=== Inter-provincial ===
Clarke lined out with Ulster in the inter-provincial hurling competition. He had little success with his province as Ulster have failed to even qualify for the Railway Cup final in recent years.

== Honours ==
- Down Senior Hurling Championship (10): 1990, 1992, 1997, 1998, 2003, 2004, 2005, 2008, 2010
- Ulster Senior Club Hurling Championship (2): 1998, 2005
- Ulster Senior Hurling Championship (1): 1997
- Ulster Minor Hurling Championship (1): 1989
- All-Ireland Poc Fada (1): 2010
- National Hurling League Division 2 (1): 2004
- Christy Ring Cup Champion 15 (1): 2007

== References and sources ==
Sources

- Donegan, Des (2005). The Complete Handbook of Gaelic Games. Blackrock: DBA Publications. ISBN 0-9551115-0-1.
