= Keelan Molloy =

Irish hurler

Personal information
- Native name: Caolán O Maolmhuiadh (Irish)
- Born: 1998 (age 27–28) Dunloy, County Antrim, Northern Ireland

Sport
- Sport: Hurling
- Position: Midfield
Club
- Years: Club
- Dunloy
Club titles
- Antrim titles: 2
College
- Years: College
- Ulster University
College titles
- Fitzgibbon titles: 0
Inter-county
- Years: County
- 2018-present: Antrim
Inter-county titles
- Leinster titles: 0
- All-Irelands: 0
- NHL: 0
- All Stars: 0

Keelan Molloy (born 1998) is an Irish hurler who plays for Antrim Senior Championship club Dunloy and at inter-county level with the Antrim senior hurling team. He usually lines out as a midfielder.

== Career ==
A member of the Dunloy club, Molloy first came to prominence with the club's senior team that won County Championship titles in 2017 and 2019. He made his first appearance on the inter-county scene as a member of the Antrim minor team that won consecutive Ulster Minor Championship titles in 2015 and 2016 before later playing for the under-21 team. Molloy joined the Antrim senior hurling team in 2018 and has since won a Joe McDonagh Cup title.

== Honours ==
Dunloy

- Antrim Senior Hurling Championship: 2017, 2019

Antrim

- Joe McDonagh Cup: 2020
- Ulster Minor Hurling Championship: 2015, 2016
