= Eoghan Campbell =

Irish hurler

Personal information
- Native name: Eoghan Mac Cathmhaoil (Irish)
- Born: 1994 (age 31–32) Cushendall; County Antrim, Northern Ireland
- Occupation: Data migration consultant

Sport
- Sport: Hurling
- Position: Right wing-back
Club
- Years: Club
- Ruairí Óg
Club titles
- Antrim titles: 3
- Ulster titles: 2
- All-Ireland Titles: 0
College
- Years: College
- 2014-2017: Ulster University
College titles
- Fitzgibbon titles: 0
Inter-county
- Years: County
- 2013-present: Antrim
Inter-county titles
- Ulster titles: 5
- All-Irelands: 0
- NHL: 0
- All Stars: 0

Eoghan Campbell (born 1994) is a hurler from Northern Ireland who plays for Antrim Senior Championship club Ruairí Óg and at inter-county level with the Antrim senior hurling team. He usually lines out as a wing-back.

== Career ==
Campbell joined the Ruairí Óg club in Cushendall at a young age and played in all grades at juvenile and underage levels. As a member of the club's senior team he lined out at centre-back when Ruairí Óg lost the 2016 All-Ireland club final to Na Piarsaigh. At inter-county level, Campbell won three consecutive Ulster Championships with the Antrim under-21 team and was at midfield for the 2013 All-Ireland U21 final defeat by Wexford. As a member of the Antrim senior hurling team he has won five consecutive Ulster Championship titles, a National League Division 2A title and a Joe McDonagh Cup title.

== Honours ==
Ruairí Óg

- Ulster Senior Club Hurling Championship: 2015, 2018
- Antrim Senior Hurling Championship: 2014, 2015, 2018

Antrim

- Ulster Senior Hurling Championship: 2013, 2014, 2015, 2016, 2017
- Joe McDonagh Cup: 2020
- National Hurling League Division 2A: 2017
- Ulster Under-21 Hurling Championship: 2013, 2014, 2015
