= All-Ireland Hurling Championship =

All-Ireland Hurling Championship may refer to:

- All-Ireland Senior Hurling Championship
- All-Ireland Senior Club Hurling Championship
- All-Ireland Intermediate Club Hurling Championship
- All-Ireland Junior Club Hurling Championship
- All-Ireland Poc Fada Championship
- All-Ireland Intermediate Hurling Championship
- All-Ireland Minor Hurling Championship
