= Ryan Elliott =

Ryan Elliott may refer to:

- Ryan Elliott (hurler) (born 1997), Irish hurler
- Ryan Elliott (cyclist) (born 2004), Australian track cyclist
