= Seán McGuinness (hurling manager) =

Irish hurling manager (1945–2021)

Personal information
- Born: 1945 Belfast, Northern Ireland
- Died: 30 August 2021 (aged 76) Belfast, Northern Ireland
- Occupation: Engineering instructor

Sport
- Sport: Hurling
Club management
- Years: Club
- Patrick Sarsfields; Bredagh
Inter-county management
- Years: Team
- 1983–1986 1989–1995 1997–1998: Antrim; Down; Antrim
Inter-county titles as manager
County	League	Province	All-Ireland
Antrim Down	0; 0	1; 2	1; 2

John Joseph McGuinness (1945 – 30 August 2021), known as Seán McGuinness, was a hurling manager. A member of the Patrick Sarsfields club, he had a lengthy career as a manager at club and inter-county levels.

== Managerial career ==
McGuinness first became involved in team management as a selector with the Patrick Sarsfields that won the 1974 Antrim County Championship. He subsequently took over as manager at the club, and guided the team to a league title in 1976.

At inter-county level, McGuinness was first nominated as a selector with the Antrim senior hurling team in 1983, and ended up taking over as manager. His fours seasons in charge saw Antrim beaten in four consecutive All-Ireland semi-finals, however, his team came close to causing an upset against Cork in 1986. After resigning on a point of principle, McGuinness was back in inter-county management with the Down senior hurling team. His six seasons in charge saw Down win two Ulster Championship titles and gain promotion to Division 1 of the National Hurling League. McGuinness simultaneously took charge of the Ulster team that contested three Railway Cup finals in four years. He returned to the Antrim senior team for one season in 1998, ending the year with the Ulster Championship title.

== Personal life and death ==
Born in West Belfast, McGuinness was educated at Hardinge Street Junior Technical School, before leaving school at 15. He trained as a sheet metalworker and later worked at St Patrick's Training School as an engineering instructor.

McGuinness died after a brief illness on 30 August 2021, aged 76.

== Honours ==
Patrick Sarsfields

- Antrim Senior Hurling Championship: 1974

Antrim

- Ulster Senior Hurling Championship: 1998

Down

- Ulster Senior Hurling Championship: 1992, 1995
