= Stephen Rooney =

Irish hurler

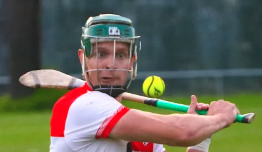

Personal information
- Nickname: Roon-dog
- Born: 1994 (age 31–32) Belfast, Northern Ireland
- Occupation: Software Developer
- Height: 6 ft 0 in (183 cm)

Sport
- Sport: Hurling
- Position: Left corner-back
Club
- Years: Club
- 21: St. Paul's
Club titles
- Antrim titles: 1
College
- Years: College
- 7: 1
Inter-county
- Years: County
- 2014-present: Antrim
Inter-county titles
- Ulster titles: 1
- All-Irelands: 0
- NHL: 2
- All Stars: 0

Stephen Rooney (born 1994) is a hurler from Belfast, Northern Ireland. He plays for Antrim Championship club St. Paul's and at inter-county level with the Antrim senior hurling team. He usually lines out as a corner-back.

== Career ==
A member of the St. Paul's club in Belfast, Rooney had been a member of the club's junior team for almost a decade when they won the County Junior Championship title in 2020. He made his first appearance on the inter-county scene as a member of the Antrim minor team that won the Ulster Minor Championship titles in 2011. Rooney made his debut with the Antrim senior hurling team in 2014. Since then he has won two Joe McDonagh Cup titles and two National League Division 2A titles.

St. Paul's

- Antrim Junior Hurling Championship: 2020

Antrim

- Joe McDonagh Cup: Joe McDonagh Cup 2020 and 2022.
- National Hurling League Division 2A: 2017, 2020
- Ulster Minor Hurling Championship: 2011
