= Neil McManus =

Irish hurler

Personal information
- Native name: Niall Mac Mánais (Irish)
- Born: 02/06/1988 Cushendall, County Antrim, Northern Ireland
- Height: 6 ft 2 in (188 cm)

Sport
- Sport: Hurling
- Position: Centre-forward
Club
- Years: Club
- 2005-present: Ruairí Óg
Club titles
- Antrim titles: 3
- Ulster titles: 2
Inter-county*
Years	County	Apps (scores)
2007-present	Antrim	30 (7-112)
Inter-county titles
- Ulster titles: 5
- All-Irelands: 0
- NHL: 0
- All Stars: 0
- *Inter County team apps and scores correct as of 13:20, 11 June 2022.

Neil McManus (born 1988) is an Irish hurler who plays as a centre-forward for the Antrim senior team.

Born in Cushendall, County Antrim, McManus first played competitive hurling during his school days at St MacNissi's College. He arrived on the inter-county scene at the age of seventeen when he first linked up with the Antrim minor team, before later lining out with the under-21 side. He made his senior debut in the 2007 championship. McManus has been a key member of the team since then, and has won five Ulster medals and one Walsh Cup medal.

McManus has represented the Ulster inter-provincial team on a number of occasions. At club level he is a two-time Ulster medallist with Ruairí Óg. He has also won three championship medals.

== Playing career ==
=== Club ===
McManus plays his club hurling with the Cushendall Ruairí Óg club and has enjoyed much success. After a promising under-age career he made his senior debut as a seventeen-year-old in 2005. That year he won his first senior county championship.

Cushendall made it two-in-a-row in 2006 with McManus later collecting an Ulster club title.

After surrendering their county and provincial titles in 2007, Cushendall returned in 2008 with McMaus winning a third county title following another win over Loughgiel Shamrocks. He later secured a second Ulster club title following a win over Ballygalget.

=== Inter-county ===
McManus first came to prominence on the inter-county scene as a member of the Antrim minor hurling team. With the 'young saffrons' he won three Ulster titles in succession in 2004, 2005 and as captain in 2006. He subsequently joined the Antrim under-21 hurling team, winning his first Ulster title while still a minor in 2006. He won a second Ulster under-21 title in 2009.

McManus made his senior debut in 2007 in a National Hurling League game against Dublin. Later that year he made his championship debut in the provincial decider. A 2–24 to 0-4 trouncing of Down gave McManus his first Ulster title.

In 2008 McManus missed the later stages of the National League and the entire championship campaign due to injury. He returned in 2009 and has become Antrim's top score-getters.

=== Inter-provincial ===
McManus has also lined out with Ulster in the inter-provincial series of games.

== Career statistics ==
=== Club ===
As of match played 10 February 2018.

Team	Year	Ulster		All-Ireland		Total	
Team	Year	Apps	Score	Apps	Score	Apps	Score
Ruairí Óg, Cushendall	2005-06	1	0-00	0	0-00	1	0-00
Ruairí Óg, Cushendall	2006-07	2	0-00	1	0-00	3	0-00
Ruairí Óg, Cushendall	2008-09	2	0-01	1	0-04	3	0-05
Ruairí Óg, Cushendall	2014-15	3	1-19	0	0-00	3	1-19
Ruairí Óg, Cushendall	2015-16	2	0-15	2	2-14	4	2-29
Total		10	1-35	4	2-18	14	3-53

=== Inter-county ===
As of 26 June 2021

Team	Year	National League			Ring Cup		McDonagh Cup		Ulster		Leinster		All-Ireland		Total	
Team	Year	Division	Apps	Score	Apps	Score	Apps	Score	Apps	Score	Apps	Score	Apps	Score	Apps	Score
Antrim	2007	Division 1	3	1-04	—		—		1	0-07	—		3	1-03	7	2-14
Antrim	2008	Division 1	2	0-04	—		—		0	0-00	—		0	0-00	2	0-04
Antrim	2009	Division 2	5	4-03	—		—		1	0-03	1	0-01	1	1-00	8	5-07
Antrim	2010	Division 2	6	6-19	—		—		1	0-04	1	1-04	3	0-22	11	7-49
Antrim	2011	Division 2	7	4-46	—		—		0	0-00	2	0-15	3	0-27	12	4-88
Antrim	2012	Division 1B	5	0-12	—		—		1	0-01	1	0-03	1	1-01	8	1-17
Antrim	2013	Division 1B	5	1-41	—		—		1	1-05	2	2-09	1	0-06	9	4-61
Antrim	2014	Division 1B	5	0-07	—		—		0	0-00	5	0-07	1	0-01	11	0-15
Antrim	2015	Division 1B	7	0-07	—		—		0	0-00	2	1-02	1	0-01	10	1-10
Antrim	2016	Division 2A	—		—		—		—		—		—		—	
Antrim	2017	Division 2A	3	1-05	3	2-19	—		1	1-06	—		—		7	4-30
Antrim	2018	Division 1B	6	0-62	—		6	3-67	—		—		—		12	3-129
Antrim	2019	Division 2A	2	0-02	—		4	1-30	—		—		—		6	1-32
Antrim	2020	Division 2A	6	4-33	—		1	0-04	—		—		—		7	4-37
Antrim	2021	Division 1B	4	2-06	—		—		—		1	0-06	—		5	2-12
Total			66	23-251	3	2-19	11	4-101	6	2-26	15	4-47	14	3-61	115	38-505

== Honours ==
=== Team ===
Ruairí Óg

- Ulster Senior Club Hurling Championship (5): 2006, 2008, 2015, 2018, 2023
- Antrim Senior Hurling Championship (7): 2005, 2006, 2008, 2014, 2015, 2018, 2023

Antrim

- National League Division 2A (1): 2020
- Joe McDonagh Cup (1): 2020
- Ulster Senior Hurling Championship (5): 2007, 2009, 2010, 2012, 2013
- Walsh Cup (1): 2008
- Ulster Under-21 Hurling Championship (2): 2006, 2009
- Ulster Minor Hurling Championship (2): 2005, 2006

=== Individual ===
Honours

- Ulster Colleges Hurling All-Stars (2): 2004, 2006

Sporting positions
Preceded by Eoin Price	Ireland Composite Rules Shinty-Hurling Captain; 2013	Incumbent
