= Dinny Donnelly =

Irish Gaelic footballer (1937–2008)

Personal information
- Native name: Donncha Ó Donnaile (Irish)
- Born: 1937 Skryne, County Meath, Ireland
- Died: 27 October 2008 (aged 71) Navan, County Meath, Ireland
- Occupation: Farmer
- Height: 6 ft 0 in (183 cm)

Sport
- Sport: Gaelic football
- Position: Left wing-forward
Clubs
- Years: Club
- Skryne; Kilmessan
Club titles
	Football	Hurling
Meath titles	1	4
Inter-county
- Years: County
- Meath
Inter-county titles
- Leinster titles: 2
- All-Irelands: 0
- NFL: 0

Denis Donnelly (1937 – 27 October 2008) was an Irish Gaelic footballer and hurler who played for club sides Skryne and Kilmessan and at inter-county level with the Meath senior teams in both codes. He usually lined out as a full-back.

== Career ==
Donnelly lined out for the Meath senior teams as a dual player. He was captain of the senior football team that won the Leinster Championship in 1964. Donnelly also filled the right corner-back position on the Meath team that was beaten by Galway in the 1966 All-Ireland final. He also won two Leinster Junior Championships with the Meath senior hurling team. At club level, Donnelly was a member of the Skryne team that won the Meath SFC title in 1965. He also won four Meath SHC titles with sister club Kilmeassan. Donnelly was the joint-winner of the All-Ireland Poc Fada Championship in 1963.

== Personal life and death ==
Donnelly spent his entire working life as a farmer. His son, David Donnelly, also lined out with the Meath senior hurling team. Donnelly died after a period of illness at Our Lady's Hospital in Navan on 27 October 2008.

== Honours ==
Kilmessan

- Meath Senior Hurling Championship: 1961, 1962, 1965, 1969

Skryne

- Meath Senior Football Championship: 1965

Meath

- Leinster Senior Football Championship: 1964 (c), 1966
- Leinster Junior Hurling Championship: 1961, 1972

Sporting positions
Preceded by Peter Darby	Meath senior football team captain 1964	Succeeded by Martin Quinn
