= Ciarán Burke =

Irish hurler

Personal information
- Nickname: Burky
- Born: 1999 (age 26–27) Ballinamere, County Offaly, Ireland
- Occupation: Apprentice technician

Sport
- Sport: Hurling
- Position: Full-back
Club
- Years: Club
- Ballinamere
Club titles
- Offaly titles: 0
Inter-county
- Years: County
- 2020-present: Offaly
Inter-county titles
- Leinster titles: 0
- All-Irelands: 0
- NHL: 0
- All Stars: 0

Ciarán Burke (born 1999) is an Irish hurler who plays for Offaly Championship club Ballinamere and at inter-county level with the Offaly senior hurling team. He usually lines out at full-back.

== Career ==
Burke first came to hurling prominence with the combined Ballinamere/Durrow club at juvenile and underage levels, while simultaneously lining out as a schoolboy with Coláiste Choilm in Tullamore. He first appeared on the inter-county scene as a member of the Offaly minor team before later lining out with the under-20 side. Burke made his first appearance with the Offaly senior hurling team during the 2020 National League. He secured his first silverware during the 2021 season, when Offaly claimed the National League Division 2A and Christy Ring Cup titles.

== Honours ==
Offaly

- Christy Ring Cup: 2021
- National Hurling League Division 2A: 2021

Sporting positions
Preceded by Jason Sampson	Offaly senior hurling team captain 2025	Incumbent
