= James McInerny =

English cricketer, chemist, academic

Personal information
- Full name: James Jeremy McInerny
- Born: 12 April 1933; Paddington, London, England
- Died: 27 May 2012 (aged 79); England
- Batting: Right-handed

Domestic team information
- Years: Team
- 1955–1956: Oxford University

Career statistics
Competition	First-class
Matches	2
Runs scored	25
Batting average	8.33
100s/50s	–/–
Top score	22
Catches/stumpings	1/–
- Source: Cricinfo, 10 June 2020

James Jeremy McInerny (12 April 1933 – 27 May 2012) was an English first-class cricketer.

McInerny was born at Paddington in April 1933. He was educated at Christ's Hospital, before going up to Hertford College, Oxford. While studying at Oxford, McInerny played first-class cricket for Oxford University in 1955 and 1956, making two appearances against the Free Foresters and the Marylebone Cricket Club. He scored 25 runs in these matches with a high score of 22. McInerny died in May 2012.
