= Ryan Elliott (hurler) =

Irish hurler

Personal information
- Native name: Rian Mac Uileagóid (Irish)
- Born: 1999 (age 26–27) Dunloy, County Antrim, Northern Ireland
- Height: 5 ft 10 in (178 cm)

Sport
- Sport: Hurling
- Position: Goalkeeper
Club
- Years: Club
- Dunloy
Club titles
- Antrim titles: 2
College
- Years: College
- 2016-2020: Ulster University
College titles
- Fitzgibbon titles: 0
Inter-county*
Years	County	Apps (scores)
2018-present	Antrim	1 (0-00)
Inter-county titles
- Leinster titles: 0
- All-Irelands: 0
- NHL: 0
- All Stars: 0
- *Inter County team apps and scores correct as of 14:50, 6 July 2021.

Ryan Elliott (born 1997) is an Irish hurler who plays for Antrim Senior Championship club Dunloy and at inter-county level with the Antrim senior hurling team. He usually lines out as a goalkeeper.

== Career ==
A member of the Dunloy club, Elliott first came to prominence with the club's senior team that won County Championship titles in 2017 and 2019. He made his first appearance on the inter-county scene as a member of the Antrim under-21 team during the 2018 Leinster Championship. Elliott made his debut with the Antrim senior hurling team during the 2018 National Hurling League and lined out in goal for their 2020 Joe McDonagh Cup success.

== Honours ==
Dunloy

- Antrim Senior Hurling Championship: 2017, 2019

Antrim

- Joe McDonagh Cup: 2020
