= Brian Tracey (hurler) =

Irish hurler (born 1993)

Brain Tracey
Personal information
- Native name: Brian Ó Treasaigh (Irish)
- Born: 1993 (age 32–33) Myshall, County Carlow, Ireland
- Occupation: Sales rep

Sport
- Sport: Hurling
- Position: Goalkeeper
Club
- Years: Club
- Naomh Eoin
Club titles
- Carlow titles: 0
College
- Years: College
- 2012-2015: NUI Maynooth
College titles
- Fitzgibbon titles: 0
Inter-county
- Years: County
- 2012-present: Carlow
Inter-county titles
- Leinster titles: 0
- All-Irelands: 0
- NHL: 0
- All Stars: 0

Brian Tracey (born 1993) is an Irish hurler. At club level he plays with Naomh Eoin and at inter-county level with the Carlow senior hurling team. Tracey usually lines out as a goalkeeper.

== Career ==
Tracey began his club career at juvenile and underage levels with the Naomh Eoin, winning minor and under-21 medals as a dual player, before eventually progressing to the senior team as goalkeeper. He was in goal when Naomh Eoin lost Carlow SHC finals in 2014 and 2017. Tracey also played with NUI Maynooth during his student days and won a Ryan Cup medal in 2014.

Tracey began his inter-county career with Carlow during a two-year tenure with the minor team in 2010 and 2011. He was immediately drafted onto the under-21 team, however, his three seasons in this grade ended without success. Tracey was called up to the senior team by manager Kevin Ryan in 2012 and was part of the panel when Carlow claimed the National League Division 2A title after beating Westmeath. He was sub-goalkeeper when Carlow beat Antrim by 5–23 to 4–15 to claim a Christy Ring Cup winners' medal in 2017.

Tracey added a second Division 2A medal to his collection after another defeat of Westmeath in 2018. Later that season he claimed a Joe McDonagh Cup medal after beating Westmeath in the inaugural final of the competition.

Tracey claimed a second Joe McDonagh Cup winners' medal after a 2–29 to 1–31 defeat of Offaly in the 2023 final. He ended the season by being named on the Team of the Year.

== Honours ==
=== Team ===
NUI Maynooth

- Ryan Cup: 2014

Carlow

- Joe McDonagh Cup: 2018, 2023
- Christy Ring Cup: 2017
- National Hurling League Division 2A: 2012, 2018

=== Individual ===
Awards

- Joe McDonagh Cup Team of the Year: 2023
