= Ciarán Clarke =

Irish hurler

Personal information
- Native name: Ciarán Ó Cléirigh (Irish)
- Born: 1993 (age 32–33) Ballycastle, County Antrim, Northern Ireland

Sport
- Sport: Hurling
- Position: Left corner-forward
Club
- Years: Club
- Ballycastle McQuillan
Club titles
- Antrim titles: 0
Inter-county*
Years	County	Apps (scores)
2013-present	Antrim	10 (2-18)
Inter-county titles
- Ulster titles: 1
- All-Irelands: 0
- NHL: 0
- All Stars: 0
- *Inter County team apps and scores correct as of 14:47, 24 May 2015.

Ciarán Clarke (born 1993) is an Irish hurler who plays as a left corner-forward for the Antrim senior team.

== Biography ==
Born in Ballycastle, County Antrim, Clarke first arrived on the inter-county scene at the age of sixteen when he first linked up with the Antrim minor team, before later joining the under-21 side. He made his senior debut during the 2013 championship. Clarke immediately became a regular member of the starting fifteen and has won one Ulster medal.

Clarke has been a member of the Ulster inter-provincial team on a number of occasions, Fenton won three Railway Cup medals. At club level he plays with Ballycastle McQuillan.

== Honours ==
=== Team ===
Antrim

- National League Division 2A (1): 2020
- Joe McDonagh Cup (1): 2020
- Ulster Senior Hurling Championship (1): 2013
- Ulster Under-21 Hurling Championship (1): 2013
- Ulster Minor Hurling Championship (2): 2009, 2010
