= Pádraig Delaney =

Irish hurler

Personal information
- Native name: Pádraig Ó Dúláinne (Irish)
- Born: 1999 (age 26–27) Cullohill, County Laois, Ireland
- Occupation: Student

Sport
- Sport: Hurling
- Position: Left wing-back
Club
- Years: Club
- The Harps
Club titles
- Laois titles: 0
Inter-county
- Years: County
- 2019-: Laois
Inter-county titles
- Leinster titles: 0
- All-Irelands: 0
- NHL: 0
- All Stars: 0

Pádraig Delaney (born 1999) is an Irish hurler who plays for Laois Senior Championship club The Harps and at inter-county level with the Laois senior hurling team. He usually lines out at as a left wing-back.

== Honours ==
Laois

- Joe McDonagh Cup (1): 2019
