= James McInerney (hurler) =

Irish hurler

Personal information
- Native name: Séamus Mac an Airchinnigh (Irish)
- Born: Newmarket-on-Fergus, County Clare
- Occupation: Student

Sport
- Sport: Hurling
- Position: Wing-Back
Inter-county
- Years: County
- 2006-present: Clare
Inter-county titles
- Munster titles: 0
- All-Irelands: 0
- NHL: 0
- All Stars: 0

James McInerney is an Irish sportsperson. He plays hurling with his local club Newmarket and is a member of the Clare senior hurling team.

He won the 2016 All-Ireland Poc Fada Championship.
