= Cillian Kiely =

Irish hurler

Personal information
- Native name: Cillian Ó Cadhla (Irish)
- Born: 11 January 1996 (age 30) Kilcormac, County Offaly, Ireland
- Occupation: Fitter
- Height: 6 ft 3 in (191 cm)

Sport
- Sport: Hurling
- Position: Centre-back
Club
- Years: Club
- 2014-present: Kilcormac–Killoughey
Club titles
- Offaly titles: 3
Inter-county
- Years: County
- 2015-present: Offaly
Inter-county titles
- Leinster titles: 0
- All-Irelands: 0
- NHL: 0
- All Stars: 0

Cillian Kiely (born 11 January 1996) is an Irish hurler. At club level he plays with Kilcormac–Killoughey and at inter-county level with the Offaly senior hurling team. He is a brother of Cathal Kiely.

== Career ==
At school, Kiely played hurling at Coláiste Naomh Cormac in Kilcormac. At club level, he first appeared at juvenile and underage levels with Kilcormac–Killoughey and was named Offaly Minor Hurler of the Year after the club's Offaly MHC success in 2012. He also won the Hurler of the Year award during his time with the club's under-21 team. At senior level, Kiely has won Offaly SHC medals in 2014, 2017 and 2023. The latter victory resulted in him being named Offaly Hurler of the Year.

Kiely first appeared on the inter-county scene for Offaly during a two-year tenure with the minor team. He was the team's top scorer in his second and final season with the team in 2014. He later spent three season with the under-21 team.

Kiely made his senior team debut in a National Hurling League game against Laois in 2015. He quickly became a regular member of the team but stepped away for a period in 2021 and 2022. After returning to the team, Kiely won a Joe McDonagh Cup medal in 2024 after a defeat of Laois in the final.

== Honours ==
Kilcormac–Killoughey

- Offaly Senior Hurling Championship: 2014, 2017, 2023

Offaly

- Joe McDonagh Cup: 2024
- National Hurling League Division 2A: 2023
