= Ciarán Herron =

Irish hurler

Ciarán Herron (born 1981) is a former hurler from Northern Ireland, who played as a left wing-back for the Antrim senior team.

== Career ==
Herron made his first appearance for the team during the 2000 championship and became a regular player until his retirement at the end of the 2011 championship. During that time he has won one Christy Ring Cup winner's medal and ten successive Ulster winner's medals. He was nominated for an All Stars Award in 2003.

=== Club career ===
At club level Herron played with the Lámh Dhearg club and is now playing with Cumann Caoimhín Ó Loinsigh, Dungiven since his transfer several years ago. Ciarán Herron has won 3 Senior County Derry championships hurling for the Kevin Lynch club.
