= Simon McCrory =

Irish hurler

Personal information
- Native name: Siomón Mac Ruairí (Irish)
- Born: 1988 (age 37–38) Belfast, Northern Ireland

Sport
- Sport: Hurling
- Position: Right wing-back
Club
- Years: Club
- 2006-present: St. John's
Club titles
- Antrim titles: 0
Inter-county
Years	County	Apps (scores)
2007-present	Antrim	22 (2-10)
Inter-county titles
- Ulster titles: 10
- All-Irelands: 0
- NHL: 1
- All Stars: 1

Simon McCrory (born 1987 in Belfast, Northern Ireland) is an Irish sportsperson. He plays hurling with his local club St. John's and has been a member of the Antrim senior inter-county hurling team since 2007.
