= Fintan O'Connor =

Irish hurling manager

Fintan O'Connor is an Irish hurling manager, coach and selector. He was the manager of the senior Kerry county hurling team from 2016 to 2022.

Born in Kilcullen, County Kildare, O'Connor grew up with an association with rugby union. He managed Waterpark RFC before becoming involved with various hurling teams at Blackwater Community School. O'Connor later served as manager of the Fourmilewater team before guiding Cappoquin to Munster success in the intermediate grade in 2014. That same year he was part of the Waterford Institute of Technology Fitzgibbon Cup-winning management team. O'Connor spent two years as a selector with the Waterford senior team, helping the team to a National Hurling League title in 2015.

He was appointed manager of the senior Kerry county hurling team in January 2016.

Fintan was a coach with 2025 Tipperary u20 all Ireland winning team.

== Honours ==
=== Manager ===
Cappoquin

- Munster Intermediate Club Hurling Championship (1): 2014
- Waterford Intermediate Hurling Championship (1): 2014

Kerry

- All-Ireland Under-21 B Hurling Championship (1): 2017
- All-Ireland Under-20 B Hurling Championship (2): 2018, 2019

=== Selector ===
Waterford Institute of Technology

- Fitzgibbon Cup (1): 2014

Waterford

- National Hurling League (1): 2015

Sporting positions
Preceded by Ciarán Carey	Kerry Senior Hurling Manager; 2016–2021	Succeeded by Stephen Molumphy
