= Fionán Mackessy =

Irish hurler

Personal information
- Native name: Fionán Ó Macasa (Irish)
- Born: 1998 (age 27–28) Ardfert, County Kerry, Ireland
- Height: 6 ft 5 in (196 cm)

Sport
- Sport: Hurling
- Position: Full-back
Clubs
- Years: Club
- Ardfert; St Brendan's; O'Loughlin Gaels
Club titles
- Kilkenny titles: 0
College
- Years: College
- 2016-2022: MTU Kerry
College titles
- Fitzgibbon titles: 0
Inter-county
- Years: County
- 2019-2024 2025-: Kerry; Kilkenny
Inter-county titles
- Leinster titles: 1
- All-Irelands: 0
- NHL: 0
- All Stars: 0

Fionán Mackessy (born 1998) is an Irish hurler who plays for Kerry Senior Championship club St Brendan's and at inter-county level with the Kerry senior hurling team. He usually lines out as a centre-back. Following a work related move to County Kilkenny, he subsequently joined O'Loughlin Gaels, and lined out with the county team in 2025.

== Career ==
Mackessy first came to prominence as a dual player, primarily with St Brendan's Hurling Club but also as a Gaelic footballer with the Ardfert club. He has enjoyed championship success in the minor and under-21 grades and was at centre-back when St Brendan's were beaten by Kilmoyley in the 2021 Kerry SHC final.

Mackessy first appeared on the inter-county scene as a dual player at minor level with the respective Kerry minor teams. After winning consecutive All-Ireland MBHC titles, including one as team captain, he was a member of the extended training panel when the Kerry minor football team beat Galway in the 2016 All-Ireland minor final. Mackessy subsequently lined out for the under-21 team before making his Kerry senior hurling team debut in 2019. He has also won a Ryan Cup with MTU Kerry.

== Career statistics ==
As of 6 March 2022.

Team	Year	National League			McDonagh Cup		Total	
Team	Year	Division	Apps	Score	Apps	Score	Apps	Score
Kerry	2019	Division 2A	4	0-00	0	0-00	4	0-00
Kerry	2020	Division 2A	5	0-01	5	0-00	10	0-01
Kerry	2021	Division 2A	3	0-01	3	0-00	6	0-01
Kerry	2022	Division 2A	4	1-03	0	0-00	4	1-03
Career total			16	1-05	8	0-00	24	1-05

== Honours ==
MTU Kerry

- Ryan Cup: 2022 (c)

Kerry

Football

- All-Ireland Minor Football Championship: 2016
- Munster Minor Football Championship: 2016

Hurling

- All-Ireland Minor B Hurling Championship: 2014 (c), 2015
- All-Ireland Under-21 B Hurling Championship: 2018

Kilkenny

- Leinster Senior Hurling Championship: 2025

Individual

- Higher Education GAA Rising Stars Football Team (1): 2022
- Higher Education GAA Rising Stars Hurling Team (1): 2022
- All Ireland poc fada champion 2023 and 2024
- Ireland shinty under-21 2019 and 2020
- Ireland shinty senior 2023
- Joe McDonagh senior hurling all-star 2020, 2021, 2022, 2023 and 2024
