= Conor McCann =

Irish hurler

Personal information
- Native name: Conchúr Mac Cana (Irish)
- Born: 1992 (age 33–34) Randalstown, County Antrim
- Occupation: Student

Sport
- Sport: Hurling
- Position: Right corner-forward
Club
- Years: Club
- 2009-present: Kickhams Creggan
Club titles
- Antrim titles: 1
Inter-county*
Years	County	Apps (scores)
2011-	Antrim	4 (2-6)
Inter-county titles
- Ulster titles: 2
- Leinster titles: 0
- All-Irelands: 0
- NHL: 0
- All Stars: 0
- *Inter County team apps and scores correct as of 16:12, 10 August 2012.

Conor McCann (born 1992 in Randalstown, County Antrim) is a Northern Irish sportsperson. He plays hurling with his local club Kickhams Creggan and has been a member of the Antrim senior inter-county hurling team since 2011.

== Honours ==
Kickhams GAC Creggan

- Antrim Senior Football Championship (1): 2021

Antrim

- National League Division 2A (1): 2020
- Joe McDonagh Cup (2): 2020 (c) 2022

Individual

- Joe McDonagh Cup Player of the Year (1): 2020
- Joe McDonagh Cup Team of the Year (1): 2020

Awards
Preceded by New award	Joe McDonagh Cup Player of the Year; 2020	Succeeded by Incumbent
