= Mattie Donnelly (hurler) =

Irish sportsperson

Personal information
- Born: Ireland

Sport
- Sport: Hurling
- Position: Forward
Club
- Years: Club
- McQuillan GAC Ballycastle
Inter-county
| Years | County | Apps (scores) |
| 2011- | Antrim | 1 |
Inter-county titles
- Leinster titles: 0
- All-Irelands: 0
- NHL: 0
- All Stars: 0

Mattie Donnelly is an Irish sportsperson. He plays hurling with the Antrim senior inter-county hurling team. On 29 May 2011, he made his championship debut against Wexford in the 2011 All-Ireland Senior Hurling Championship, coming on as a substitute in a 3-16 to 1-11 defeat.
