= Jack Regan (hurler) =

Irish hurler

Personal information
- Native name: Seán Ó Riagáin (Irish)
- Born: 7 August 1995 (age 31) Summerhill, County Meath, Ireland

Sport
- Sport: Hurling
- Position: Full-forward
Club
- Years: Club
- Kiltale
Club titles
- Meath titles: 5
Inter-county
Years	County	Apps (scores)
2014-present	Meath	0 (0-00)
Inter-county titles
- Leinster titles: 0
- All-Irelands: 2 Christy Ring winner
- NHL: 0
- All Stars: 0

Jack Regan (born 7 August 1995) is an Irish hurler who plays as a full-forward for the Meath senior team.

Born in Summerhill, County Meath, Regan first played competitive hurling at juvenile and underage levels with the Kiltale club. He eventually became a member of the club's senior team, and has won five county senior championship medals since 2012.

Regan made his debut on the inter-county scene at the age of sixteen when he was selected for the Meath minor team. After winning an All-Ireland medal in his debut year, he had two further championship seasons with the minor team. Regan subsequently joined the Meath under-21 team, winning an All-Ireland medal as captain in 2016. By this stage he had also joined the Meath senior team, making his debut during the 2014 league.

== Honours ==
Kiltale

- Meath Senior Hurling Championship: 2012, 2014, 2015, 2016, 2017

Meath

- All-Ireland Under-21 B Hurling Championship: 2016 (c)
- All-Ireland Minor B Hurling Championship: 2011

Achievements
Preceded by Gavin Weir	All-Ireland Under-21 B Hurling Final winning captain 2016	Succeeded by Daragh Shanahan
