= Ulster Under-20 Hurling Championship =

Ulster Under-21 Hurling Championship
- Founded: 1964
- Title holders: Antrim (39th title)
- Most titles: Antrim (39 titles)
- Sponsors: Bord Gais Energy

The Ulster U-21 Hurling Championship, or for sponsorship reasons the Erin Ulster Under-21 Hurling Championship, is an Under 21 hurling tournament between counties affiliated to Ulster. The winners of the Ulster championship go on to qualify for the All-Ireland Under-21 Hurling Championship. The most successful county to date are Antrim who have won the competition on 39 occasions.

The 2010 champions were Antrim who defeated Armagh by 0-21 to 0-16. . Antrim had won the 2009 title by beating Derry. In 2011, Antrim completed a three in a row of titles, beating Armagh.

Armagh, Cavan, Donegal, Fermanagh, Monaghan and Tyrone have never won an Under-21 hurling championship.

== Teams ==
County	Championship Titles	Last championship title
Antrim	39	2026
Derry	7	2024
Donegal	0	—
Down	12	2004

== Roll of honour ==
#	County	Title(s)	Years won
1	Antrim	39	1964, 1965, 1966, 1967, 1970, 1972, 1973, 1974, 1976, 1978, 1979, 1980, 1981, 1982, 1988, 1989, 1991, 1992, 1994, 1995, 1996, 1998, 1999, 2000, 2001, 2002, 2005, 2006, 2009, 2010, 2011, 2012, 2013, 2014, 2015, 2016, 2023, 2025, 2026
2	Down	12	1968, 1969, 1971, 1975, 1977, 1983, 1984, 1985, 1987, 1990, 2003, 2004
3	Derry	7	1986, 1993, 1997, 2007, 2008, 2017, 2024

- Only three counties from Ulster have won the Under-21/Under-20 championship

== List of finals ==
Year	Winners		Runners-up	
Year	County	Score	County	Score
Under-20
2026	Antrim	3-25	Down	2-10
2025	Antrim	1-25	Down	1-13
2024	Derry	2-15	Antrim	2-12
2023	Antrim	2-13	Derry	0-11
2018–2022	No championship			
Under-21
2017	Derry	3-17	Down	1-09
2016	Antrim	0-16	Derry	1-09
2015	Antrim	1-19	Derry	0-17
2014	Antrim	7-17	Down	1-05
2013	Antrim	6-22	Derry	0-06
2012	Antrim	2-14	Derry	1-07
2011	Antrim	0-15	Armagh	2-07
2010	Antrim	0-21	Armagh	0-16
2009	Antrim	1-18	Derry	0-09
2008	Derry	See note		
2007	Derry	2-16	Antrim	1-17
2006	Antrim	2-15	Down	2-11
2005	Antrim	3-12	Down	0-16
2004	Down	5-08	Derry	4-07
2003	Down	3-12	Antrim	1-12
2002	Antrim	2-23	Down	0-06
2001	Antrim	2-18	Derry	1-16
2000	Antrim	2-14	Derry	0-03
1999	Antrim	2-14	Derry	0-12
1998	Antrim	3-20	Down	4-08
1997	Derry	2-11, 0-22 (R)	Antrim	0-17, 1-16 (R)
1996	Antrim	1-13	Down	1-12
1995	Antrim	2-18	Derry	1-07
1994	Antrim	1-20	Down	1-04
1993	Derry	2-13	Antrim	1-08
1992	Antrim	3-11	Down	3-04
1991	Antrim	2-19	Down	2-06
1990	Down	2-09	Antrim	2-06
1989	Antrim	4-18	Derry	0-04
1988	Antrim	6-11	Down	1-04
1987	Down	3-12	Derry	2-09
1986	Derry	2-09, 3-09 (R)	Down	2-09, 1-02 (R)
1985	Down	1-12	Antrim	1-10
1984	Down	1-14	Antrim	0-15
1983	Down	2-07	Antrim	0-07
1982	Antrim	9-14	Down	0-05
1981	Antrim	2-09	Down	1-05
1980	Antrim	4-16	Down	0-09
1979	Antrim	9-13	Armagh	2-02
1978	Antrim	5-18	Down	3-09
1977	Down	3-07	Antrim	0-09
1976	Antrim	1-09	Down	0-04
1975	Down	3-10	Antrim	1-03
1974	Antrim	3-08	Down	0-03
1973	Antrim	1-06, 3-19 (R)	Down	1-06, 3-03 (R)
1972	Antrim	4-09	Down	1-11
1971	Down	5-11	Antrim	2-09
1970	Antrim	6-12	Down	2-10
1969	Down	5-17	Antrim	2-11
1968 *	Down	7-06	Armagh	2-09
1967	Antrim	3-08	Down	2-07
1966	Antrim	4-05	Down	0-08
1965	Antrim	5-08	Down	4-07
1964	Antrim *			

Notes:

- Antrim only team entered
- 1968 was a "B" Grade competition. Antrim represented Ulster in the All-Ireland Under-21 Hurling Championship.
- The 2008 competition was organised on a league basis, with each team playing one another once. Therefore, there was no final, Derry clinched the Championship in their final league game against Down.

== See also ==
- Ulster Senior Hurling Championship

== Sources ==
- Roll of Honour on gaainfo.com
- Complete Roll of Honour on Kilkenny GAA bible
