= 2020 Joe McDonagh Cup =

- Dates: 25 October – 13 December 2020
- Teams: 5
- Champions: Antrim (1st title); Conor McCann (captain); Darren Gleeson (manager)
- Runners-up: Kerry; Bryan Murphy (captain); Fintan O'Connor (manager)

Tournament statistics
- Matches played: 11
- Goals scored: 37 (3.36 per match)
- Points scored: 419 (38.09 per match)
- Top scorer: Ciarán Clarke (4-47)

The 2020 Joe McDonagh Cup was the third staging of the Joe McDonagh Cup since its establishment by the Gaelic Athletic Association in 2018. The competition was initially scheduled to begin on 10 May 2020 and end on 29 June 2020. Due to the impact of the COVID-19 pandemic on Gaelic games, the first-round games were delayed until 25 October 2020.

Laois, the 2019 champions, were promoted to the Leinster Senior Hurling Championship, while Offaly were relegated to the Christy Ring Cup. Meath and Carlow entered the cup.

On 13 December 2020, Antrim won the Joe McDonagh Cup after a 0–22 to 1–17 win over Kerry in the final at Croke Park. It was their first ever title.

== Team changes ==
=== To Championship ===
Relegated from the All-Ireland Senior Hurling Championship

- Carlow

Promoted from the Christy Ring Cup

- Meath

=== From Championship ===
Promoted to the All-Ireland Senior Hurling Championship

- Laois

Relegated to the Christy Ring Cup

- Offaly

== Teams ==
Five teams compete in the 2020 Joe McDonagh Cup.

=== General Information ===
County	Last Cup title	Last Provincial title	Last All-Ireland title	Position in 2019 Championship	Appearance
Antrim	—	2017	—	3rd	3rd
Carlow	2018	—	—	5th (Leinster Senior Hurling Championship)	2nd
Kerry	—	1891	1891	4th	3rd
Meath	—	—	—	Champions (Christy Ring Cup)	2nd
Westmeath	—	—	—	Runners-up	3rd

=== Personnel and kits ===
County	Manager	Captain(s)	Sponsor
Antrim	Darren Gleeson	Conor McCann	fonaCAB
Carlow	Colm Bonnar	Diarmuid Byrne; Richard Coady	IT Carlow
Kerry	Fintan O'Connor	Bryan Murphy	Kerry Group
Meath	Nick Weir	Seán Geraghty	Glenveagh Properties
Westmeath	Joe Quaid	Aonghus Clarke	Renault

== Competition format ==
Joe McDonagh Cup

Initially each of the five teams play the other four teams in a round of single round-robin matches. The top two teams qualify for the Joe McDonagh Cup final which is held at Croke Park.

All-Ireland Senior Hurling Championship

Normally the top two teams also enter the All-Ireland Senior Hurling Championship where they play the third-placed teams in the Leinster and Munster championships in the two All-Ireland preliminary quarter finals with the Joe McDonagh Cup teams having home advantage. The senior hurling championship was shortened in 2020 due to the COVID-19 pandemic, resulting in the cancellation of the participation of the two Joe McDonagh Cup finalists.

Promotion to Leinster or Munster SHC

The winner of the Joe McDonagh Cup can also be promoted to the following year's Leinster or Munster Senior Hurling championships, which form the first round of the All-Ireland Senior Hurling Championship. How this is achieved depends on the province to which the Cup champions belong.

If the Joe McDonagh champions are a non-Munster team, they are automatically promoted to the following year's Leinster Championship and the bottom-placed team in the Leinster Senior Hurling Championship are automatically relegated to the following year's Joe McDonagh Cup. If the champions are a Munster team (effectively, Kerry), they must win a play-off with the bottom-placed team in the Munster Championship to gain promotion at that teams expense to the following year's Munster Championship.

Relegation

The bottom-placed team in the Joe McDonagh Cup are usually relegated to the following year's Christy Ring Cup, and replaced by the 2020 Christy Ring Cup Champions. In 2021 the Leinster Senior Hurling Championship will be increased from five to six teams, meaning there will be no team relegated from the Joe McDonagh Cup in 2020. The 2020 Christy Ring Cup winners will be promoted to Maintain the Joe McDonagh Cup as a five team competition.

== Group stage ==
=== Table ===
Pos	Team	Pld	W	D	L	SF	SA	Diff	Pts	Qualification
1	Antrim	4	3	1	0	14-89	8-64	+43	7	Advance to Knockout Stage
2	Kerry	4	3	0	1	7-75	4-67	+16	6	Advance to Knockout Stage
3	Westmeath	4	2	0	2	4-70	9-76	-21	4	
4	Carlow	4	1	1	2	6-83	9-80	-6	3	
5	Meath	4	0	0	4	5-63	6-92	-32	0	

=== Round 1 ===
25 October 2020 Round 1	Antrim	4-25 – 1-15	Westmeath	Corrigan Park
	C Clarke (2-8, 6f); C McCann (1-3); N McKenna, K Molloy (0-4 each); A O’Brien (1-0), G Walsh, E Campbell (0-2 each); D McMullan, S McCrory (0-1 each).	Report	B Murtagh (0-6f); Niall O’Brien (1-2); D Clinton (0-4); A Clarke, N Mitchell, S Williams (0-1 each).	Referee: S Stack (Dublin)

25 October 2020 Round 1	Kerry	1-20 – 0-13	Meath	Austin Stack Park
	S Conway 0-9 (9f); S Nolan 1-2; M Boyle 0-4; M O'Leary 0-2; B Barrett, M Slattery, C Harty 0-1 each.	Report	P O'Hanrahan 0-8 (6f, 1 '65); J Regan 0-4; S Whitty 0-1.	Referee: T Walsh (Waterford)

=== Round 2 ===
31 October 2020 Round 2	Westmeath	0-14 – 2-19	Kerry	TEG Cusack Park
	B Murtagh 0-4 (3f), D Clinton 0-3, R Greville, A Devine, N O'Brien 0-2 each, D McNicholas 0-1.	Report	S Conway 1-12 (8f), S Nolan 1-0, P Boyle 0-3, C Harty 0-2, M O'Leary, M O'Connor 0-1 each.	Referee: S Cleere (Kilkenny)

31 October 2020 Round 2	Carlow	2-25 – 5-16	Antrim	Netwatch Cullen Park
	M Kavanagh 0-7 (5f), C Nolan 0-5, E Byrne 1-2, J Kavanagh 0-4, JM Nolan 1-1, T Joyce, K McDonald 0-2 each, D Byrne, J Nolan 0-1.	Report	C Clarke 2-7 (1-0pen, 5f, 1 '65'), C McCann 1-1, N McKenna 0-3, D Nugent, J McNaughton 1-0 each, K Molloy 0-2, D McCloskey, P Burke, C Cunning 0-1 each.	Referee: C McAllister (Cork)

=== Round 3 ===
7 November 2020 Round 3A	Carlow	1-22 – 1-21	Meath	Netwatch Cullen Park
	M Kavanagh (1-13), J Nolan (0-3), C Nolan (0-3), J Kavanagh (0-2), E Byrne (0-1).	https://www.gaa.ie/hurling/news/joe-mcdonagh-cup-carlow-edge-out-meath/ Report	J Regan 0-6 (1’65, 5f), P O’Hanrahan 0-4 (3f), D Kelly 0-3, D Healy 1-0, K Keoghan 0-2, J Walsh 0-2, A Douglas 0-1, D McGowan 0-1, A Gannon 0-1, P Conneely 0-1.

14 November 2020 Round 3B	Antrim	3-18 - 2-14	Kerry	Corrigan Park
	C McCann (2-3); C Clarke (0-9, 7f); M Bradley (1-2); K Molloy (0-3); D McCloskey (0-1).	Report	S Conway (1-7, 3f); D Collins (1-2); T O’Connor, S Nolan, B Barrett, M Boyle, P Boyle (0-1 each).	Referee: P Murphy (Carlow)

=== Round 4 ===
21 November 2020 Round 4	Kerry	2-22 - 1-23	Carlow	Tralee
	S Conway (0-08, 0-03f, 0-01’65’), D Collins (2-01), M Boyle (0-04), M O’Leary (0-03), M O’Connor (0-02), M Leane (0-02), S Nolan (0-01), B Barrett (0-01).	Report	M Kavanagh (0-11, 0-11f), C Nolan (0-05), J Nolan (1-01), K McDonald (0-02), E Byrne (0-01), D Byrne (0-01), J Kavanagh (0-01), J Doyle (0-01).	Stadium: Austin Stack Park; Attendance: 0 Referee: C McAllister (Cork)

21 November 2020 Round 4	Meath	1-19 - 2-20	Westmeath	Navan
13:30 GMT	P O’Hanrahan (0-8, 8 frees), J Walsh (1-2), A Gannon (0-3), J Regan (2f) (0-3 each), S Morris, A Douglas, K Keoghan (0-1 each).	Report	A Clarke (0-9, 7 frees), L Loughlin, S Williams (1-0 each), C Boyle, J Boyle (0-3 each), N Mitchell (0-2), R Greville, D Clinton, A Cox (0-1 each).	Stadium: Páirc Tailteann; Attendance: 0 Referee: R McGann (Clare)

=== Round 5 ===
28 November 2020 Round 5	Westmeath	1-21 - 2-13	Carlow	Mullingar
	A Clarke 0-13 (0-6 frees, 0-2 65s), C Boyle 0-4, N Mitchell 1-0, J Galvin 0-1, S Williams 0-1, B Murtagh 0-1, L Loughlin 0-1	Report	C Nolan 0-5 (0-2 frees), J Nolan 1-1, JM Nolan 1-0, K McDonald 0-4 (0-3 frees), J Kavanagh 0-2, E Byrne 0-1.	Stadium: TEG Cusack Park; Attendance: 0

28 November 2020 Round 5	Meath	3-10 - 2-30	Antrim	Navan
13:30 GMT	J Kelly 1-1, S Morris 1-0, D Healy 1-0 (1-0f), P O'Hanrahan 0-2 (0-1f, 0-1 65), A Douglas 0-2, J Walsh 0-1, P Potterton 0-1, K Keoghan 0-1, D Kelly 0-1 (0-1f), D McGowan 0-1.	Report	C Clarke 0-12 (0-10f), M Bradley 0-8, D McCloskey 1-0, N McKenna 1-0, C McCann 0-2, J McNaughton 0-2, N McKeague 0-2, E Campbell 0-1, R McGarry 0-1, D McMullan 0-1, D Nugent 0-1.	Stadium: Páirc Tailteann; Attendance: 0 Referee: D Hughes (Kilkenny)

== Final ==
13 December 2020 Final	Kerry	1-17 - 0-22	Antrim	Dublin
13:00 GMT	S Conway (0-9, 0-8 frees); M Boyle (1-0); M O’Leary, D Collins (0-2 each); P O’Connor, C Harty, P Boyle, B O’Leary (0-1 each).	Report	C Clarke (0-11, 0-8 frees); N McManus (0-4, 0-2 ‘65s, 0-1 free); N McKenna, C Gunning (0-2 each); J McNaughton, C McCann, M Bradley (0-1 each).	Stadium: Croke Park; Attendance: 0 Referee: L Gordon (Galway)

== Stadia and locations ==
Colours	Location	Province	Stadium	Capacity
Antrim	Belfast	Ulster	Corrigan Park	5,000
Carlow	Carlow	Leinster	Netwatch Cullen Park	21,000
Kerry	Tralee	Munster	Austin Stack Park	12,000
Meath	Navan	Leinster	Páirc Tailteann	17,000
Westmeath	Mullingar	Leinster	Cusack Park	11,000

== Statistics ==
=== Top scorers ===
==== Overall ====
Rank	Player	Club	Tally	Total	Matches	Average
1	Ciarán Clarke	Antrim	4-47	59	5	11.80
2	Shane Conway	Kerry	2-45	51	5	10.20
3	Martin Kavanagh	Carlow	1-31	34	4	8.50
4	Aonghus Clarke	Westmeath	0-23	23	4	5.75
5	Conor McCann	Antrim	4-10	22	5	5.40
5	Pádraig O'Hanrahan	Meath	0-22	22	4	5.50
6	Chris Nolan	Carlow	0-18	18	4	4.50
7	Daniel Collins	Kerry	3-05	14	4	3.50
7	Michael Bradley	Antrim	1-11	14	3	4.66
8	Jack Regan	Meath	0-13	13	3	4.33

==== In a single game ====
Rank	Player	Club	Tally	Total	Opposition
1	Martin Kavanagh	Carlow	1-13	16	Meath
2	Shane Conway	Kerry	1-12	15	Westmeath
3	Ciarán Clarke	Antrim	2-08	14	Westmeath
4	Ciarán Clarke	Antrim	2-07	13	Carlow
4	Aonghus Clarke	Westmeath	0-13	13	Carlow
5	Ciarán Clarke	Antrim	0-12	12	Meath
6	Martin Kavanagh	Carlow	0-11	11	Kerry
6	Ciarán Clarke	Antrim	0-11	11	Westmeath
7	Shane Conway	Kerry	1-07	10	Antrim
8	Conor McCann	Antrim	2-03	9	Kerry
8	Ciarán Clarke	Antrim	0-09	9	Kerry
8	Shane Conway	Kerry	0-09	9	Meath
8	Aonghus Clarke	Westmeath	0-09	9	Meath
8	Shane Conway	Kerry	0-09	9	Antrim

== Miscellaneous ==
- Antrim and Kerry both qualified to the Joe McDonagh Cup final for the first time.
- Antrim won their 1st championship in 3 years since winning the 2017 Ulster Senior Hurling Championship.

== Awards ==
In February 2021, the GAA named the 2020 Joe McDonagh Team of the Year. Conor McCann of Antrim was named as the 2020 Joe McDonagh Cup player of the year.

- 1: Brian Tracey (Carlow)
- 2: Tomás O’Connor (Kerry)
- 3: Matthew Donnelly (Antrim)
- 4: Stephen Rooney (Antrim)
- 5: Jason Diggins (Kerry)
- 6: Aonghus Clarke (Westmeath)
- 7: Ger Walsh (Antrim)
- 8: Shane Nolan (Kerry)
- 9: Keelan Molloy (Antrim)
- 10: Niall McKenna (Antrim)
- 11: Shane Conway (Kerry)
- 12: Daniel Collins (Kerry)
- 13: Chris Nolan (Carlow)
- 14: Conor McCann (Antrim)
- 15: Ciaran Clarke (Antrim)
