= Ulster Minor Hurling Championship =

- Founded: 1930
- Region: Ulster (GAA)
- Current champions: Antrim (62nd time)
- Website: Official website

The Ulster Hurling Minor Championship is an annual hurling competition organised by the Ulster Council of the Gaelic Athletic Association since 1930 for the youngest competitors (under-18) in the province of Ulster in Ireland. It is sponsored by the Electricity Supply Board and therefore officially known as the ESB Ulster GAA Hurling Minor Championship. Dormant since 2017, the competition was reborn in 2023.

The series of games are played during the summer months with the Ulster final currently being played on the last Sunday of June. The minor final provides the curtain-raiser to the senior final. The prize for the winning team is the Minor Hurling Cup.

The Ulster Championship does not feed directly into the All-Ireland Minor Hurling Championship. Instead, the top teams in Ulster, at the conclusion of the Ulster Minor Hurling Championship, join the Leinster Minor Hurling Championship, along with Galway from Connacht.

Only a handful of teams currently participate in the Ulster Championship, due to dominance of Gaelic football in the province. Antrim are by far the dominant county, reflecting their unique position as a hurling county in Ulster. Their nearest rivals are Down GAA, a predominantly footballing county that nevertheless maintains a hurling stronghold on the Ards Peninsula, and Derry GAA which boasts a small but important number of 'dual' clubs that play both codes. Armagh briefly took part in the 2010s.

== Roll of honour ==
County	Title(s)	Runners-up	Years won	Years runners-up
Antrim	62	11	1931, 1933, 1935, 1936, 1937, 1938, 1939, 1940, 1941, 1945, 1946, 1947, 1948, 1949, 1950, 1951, 1952, 1953, 1954, 1955, 1956, 1958, 1959, 1960, 1961, 1962, 1963, 1964, 1965, 1966, 1968, 1969, 1970, 1986, 1987, 1988, 1992, 1993, 1995, 1996, 1997, 1998, 1999, 2000, 2002, 2003, 2004, 2005, 2006, 2007, 2008, 2009, 2010, 2011, 2013, 2014, 2015, 2016, 2017, 2023, 2025,2026	1932, 1957, 1984, 1985, 1989, 1990, 1991, 1994, 2001, 2012, 2024
Down	12	26	1930, 1932, 1934, 1956, 1966, 1971, 1972, 1976, 1978, 1984, 1985, 1989, 1994, 2012	1931, 1935, 1936, 1939, 1947, 1951, 1952, 1954, 1956, 1958, 1969, 1970, 1975, 1987, 1988, 1992, 1993, 1997, 1999, 2004, 2007, 2008, 2013, 2016, 2023, 2025
Derry	10	17	1974, 1979, 1980, 1981, 1982, 1983, 1990, 1991, 2001, 2024	1940, 1971, 1978, 1986, 1995, 1996, 1998, 2000, 2002, 2003, 2005, 2006, 2009, 2011, 2014, 2015, 2017
Armagh	1	10	1975	1950, 1955, 1964, 1965, 1972, 1974, 1980, 1981, 1982, 2010
Donegal	0	14	-	1933, 1934, 1937, 1938, 1945, 1946, 1948, 1949, 1953, 1959, 1960, 1961, 1962, 1963
Tyrone	0	3	-	1966, 1967, 1976
Monaghan	0	3	-	1930, 1979, 1983
Wicklow	0	1	-	2026

== List of finals ==
Year	Winners		Runners-up	
Year	County	Score	County	Score
2026	Antrim	4-14	Wicklow	1-15
2025	Antrim	4-27	Down	2-06
2024	Derry	1-19	Antrim	1-14
2023	Antrim	6-12	Down	1-13
2018-22	No championship			
2017	Antrim	3–13	Derry	2–08
2016	Antrim	2–15	Down	0–10
2015	Antrim	2–12	Derry	1–09
2014	Antrim	0–17	Derry	0–09
2013	Antrim	2–20	Down	1–12
2012	Down	0–18	Antrim	1–12
2011	Antrim		Derry	
2010	Antrim	2–19	Armagh	0–10
2009	Antrim	4–16	Derry	0–09
2008	Antrim	3–18	Down	0–05
2007	Antrim	2–14	Down	3–08
2006	Antrim	8–18	Derry	2–05
2005	Antrim	3–18	Derry	2–07
2004	Antrim	5–15	Down	3–07
2003	Antrim	2–11	Derry	2–09
2002	Antrim	1–11	Derry	0–04
2001	Derry	0–12	Antrim	2–05
2000	Antrim	2–11	Derry	1–09
1999	Antrim	2–13	Down	0–03
1998	Antrim	3–09	Derry	0–08
1997	Antrim	3–14	Down	1–10
1996	Antrim	3–13	Derry	2–10
1995	Antrim	2–17	Derry	1–04
1994	Down	3–11	Antrim	3–10
1993	Antrim	2–13	Down	1–09
1992	Antrim	0–12	Down	0–07
1991	Derry	3–10	Antrim	2–11
1990	Derry	4–11	Antrim	1–08
1989	Down	2–11, 3–08 (R)	Antrim	3–08, 2–08 (R)
1988	Antrim	2–10	Down	2–09
1987	Antrim	5–09	Down	0–06
1986	Antrim	2–09	Derry	1–10
1985	Down	5–04	Antrim	2–09
1984	Down	3–06	Antrim	1–11
1983	Derry	5–10	Monaghan	0–06
1982	Derry	3–14	Armagh	2–02
1981	Derry	3–06	Armagh	1–04
1980	Derry	1–05	Armagh	1–04
1979	Derry	3–08	Monaghan	2–04
1978	Down	4–09	Derry	1–11
1977	No Championship			
1976	Down	5–12	Tyrone	1–03
1975	Armagh	3–08	Down	3–06
1974	Derry	3–06	Armagh	2–08
1973	No Championship			
1972	Down	4–08	Armagh	2–04
1971	Down	5–11	Derry	4–04
1970	Antrim	4–12	Down	0–05
1969	Antrim	2–11	Down	4–03
1968	Antrim		N/A	
1967	Down	5–02 *	Tyrone	4–02
1966	Antrim	6–06	Tyrone	1–03
1965	Antrim	7–03	Armagh	1–01
1964	Antrim	11–11	Armagh	0–00
1963	Antrim	6–12	Donegal	1–01
1962	Antrim	12–07	Donegal	2–03
1961	Antrim	11–05	Donegal	4–04
1960	Antrim	16–04	Donegal	1–00
1959	Antrim	12–06	Donegal	0–02
1958	Antrim	10–05	Down	0–02
1957	Down	4–01	Antrim	3–03
1956	Antrim	7–04	Down	1–03
1955	Antrim	5–04	Armagh	2–02
1954	Antrim	9–09	Down	1–03
1953	Antrim	11–14	Donegal	1–00
1952	Antrim	8–08	Down	1–01
1951	Antrim	12–02	Down	0–01
1950	Antrim	4–03	Armagh	1–03
1949	Antrim	13–06	Donegal	1–01
1948	Antrim	15–06	Donegal	0–00
1947	Antrim	10–05	Down	0–00
1946	Antrim	8–07	Donegal	0–02
1945	Antrim	11–06	Donegal	1–01
1942-44	No Championship			
1941	Antrim *		N/A	
1940	Antrim *		Derry	
1939	Antrim	11–02	Down	0–00
1938	Antrim *		Donegal	
1937	Antrim	5–07	Donegal	2–02
1936	Antrim	6–03	Down	3–00
1935	Antrim	7–07	Down	3–01
1934	Down	8–08	Donegal	1–01
1933	Antrim	5–04	Donegal	4–05
1932	Down	3–05	Antrim	2–01
1931	Antrim	5–00	Down	3–01
1930	Down	9–07	Monaghan	0–06
