= 2026 Sligo Senior Football Championship =

121st Sligo Senior Football Championship

Tournament details
- County: Sligo
- Province: Connacht
- Year: 2026
- Sponsor: Homeland and Connacht Gold
- Date: 31 July - 11 October 2026
- Teams: 10
- Defending champions: Shamrock Gaels

Winners
- Champions: St Mary's (12th win)
- Manager: Mark Breheny
- Captain: Scott Lynch

Runners-up
- Runners-up: Shamrock Gaels
- Manager: Shane King
- Captain: David Quinn

Promotion/Relegation
- Relegated team(s): Tubbercurry

Other
- Matches played: 28
- Website: Sligo GAA

The 2026 Sligo Senior Football Championship is the 121st edition of the Sligo GAA's premier club Gaelic football tournament for senior graded teams in County Sligo, Ireland. The tournament consists of 10 teams, with the winner going on to represent Sligo in the Connacht Senior Club Football Championship. The championship starts with a group stage and then progresses to a knock-out stage.

Shamrock Gaels are the defending champions after defeating the previous defending champions Coolera–Strandhill in the 2025 Sligo S.F.C final. It was their 3rd senior title in their history.

Coolaney/Mullinabreena returned to the senior grade for the first time since 2022 after winning the 2025 Sligo I.F.C title. Curry replaced them in the 2026 Sligo I.F.C after losing to Easkey in the relegation-final.

The draw for the group stage of the championship was made on 2 April 2026.

== Championship structure ==
The 2026 Sligo S.F.C starts with a group stage consisting of two groups, each containing 5 teams. The top team in each group qualify for the semi-finals, while the second and third placed teams in each group will play against each other in the quarter-finals. The two bottom teams from each group will play each other in a relegation semi-final, with the losers playing in a relegation final.

== Team changes ==
The following teams have changed division since the 2025 championship season:

=== To S.F.C. ===
Promoted from 2025 Intermediate Football Championship

- Coolaney/Mullinabreena - (Intermediates Champions)

=== From S.F.C. ===
Relegated to 2026 Intermediate Football Championship

- Curry

== Participating teams ==
The teams that are competing in the 2026 Sligo S.F.C are:

Club	Location	Manager(s)	Pre C'ship Odds	2025 Championship Position	2026 Championship Position	In Championship Since	Championship Titles (Pre 2026)	Last Championship Title (Pre 2026)
Coolaney/Mullinabreena	Achonry, Coolaney, Killoran and Mullinabreena		50/1	I.F.C Champions	Relegation Finalist	2026	1	1970
Coolera–Strandhill	Ransboro and Strandhill		9/4	Runner-Ups	Quarter-Finalist	1996	4	2024
Drumcliffe–Rosses Point	Carney, Drumcliffe, Rathcormac and Rosses Point		13/2	Semi-Finalist	Semi-Finalist	2014	0	—
Easkey	Easkey		25/1	Relegation Finalist	Relegation Semi-Finalist	2024	5	1966
Eastern Harps	Ballinafad, Culfadda, Gurteen, Keash and Monasteraden	Keith Carty	7/1	Non-Qualifier	Relegation Semi-Finalist	2025	7	2010
Shamrock Gaels	Castlebaldwin, Gleann, Riverstown and Sooey	Shane King	15/8	Champions	Runners-Up	2019	3	2025
St Mary's	Sligo	Mark Breheny	3/1	Semi-Finalist	Champions	Never Relegated	11	2015
Naomh Molaise Gaels	Cliffoney, Drumcliffe and Maugherow		6/1	Non-Qualifier	Semi-Finalist	2023	0	—
Tourlestrane	Tourlestrane		14/1	Relegation Semi-Finalist	Quarter-Finalist	1989	18	2022
Tubbercurry	Tubbercurry	David Curran	16/1	Relegation Semi-Finalist	Relegated to Intermediate	Never Relegated	20	2014

== Group stage ==
=== Group 1 ===
Advance to semi-finals Advance to quarter-finals Advance to relegation play-off

Team	Matches				Score			Pts
Team	Pld	W	D	L	For	Against	Diff	Pts
Shamrock Gaels	4	2	2	0	99	61	+38	6
St Mary's	4	3	0	1	99	61	+3	6
Tourlestrane	4	2	1	1	90	73	+17	5
Eastern Harps	4	1	1	2	82	58	+24	3
Tubbercurry	4	0	0	4	60	142	-82	0

==== Round 1 ====
1 August 2026 Round 1	Shamrock Gaels	0-14 (14) – (14) 0-14	Eastern Harps	Tubbercurry
19:00 IST (UTC+1)		(HT: 0-07 – 0-10)		Venue: Kilcoyne Park
	Pts: David Quinn 0-5 (2f), Lee Deignan 0-3, Darragh Hailstones 0-2, Ciarán Kenny 0-2, G Barlow 0-1, Frankie Quinn 0-1	Report	Pts: Matt Henry 0-6 (3f), Kyle Cosgrove 0-2 (tp), Ronan Mulligan 0-2, J Molloy 0-1, S O'Hara 0-1, Conor Walsh 0-1, James Kiernan 0-1	Referee: Barry Judge

1 August 2026 Round 1	Tourlestrane	3-12 (21) – (25) 3-16	St Mary's	Collooney
19:00 IST (UTC+1)		(HT: 1-04 – 2-08)		Venue: Connolly Park
	Pts: John Kelly 2-3 (3f), Cathal Henry 0-6 (1tpf, 1tp, 2f), C Fleming 1-0, M Walsh 0-1, Barry Walsh 0-1, T Bailey 0-1	Report	Pts: Kyle Cawley 2-3, Nathan Rooney 0-8 (1tp, 3f), Stephen Coen 1-1, Conor Davey 0-3, Patrick Brady 0-1	Referee: Ronan Hynes

==== Round 2 ====
8 August 2026 Round 2	Tubbercurry	1-13 (16) – (20) 2-14	St Mary's	Bunnanadden
17:00 IST (UTC+1)		(HT: 1-09 – 1-10)		Venue: Bunninadden Community Park
	Pts: Conor McDonagh 0-4 (2tp), Aaron Perry 0-4 (3f), Rory Ryan 1-0, Luke Gilmartin 0-3, Cian Foran 0-1, Cian Gilmartin 0-1	Report	Pts: Nathan Rooney 1-7 (2tp), Kyle Cawley 1-0, Emlyn Mulligan 0-3, Eli Rooney 0-2, Conor Davey 0-1, Brian Meehan 0-1	Referee: Michael Duffy

9 August 2026 Round 2	Tourlestrane	1-12 (15) – (15) 2-09	Shamrock Gaels	Ballydoogan
14:00 IST (UTC+1)		(HT: 0-05 – 1-03)		Venue: Kent Park
	Pts: Cathal Henry 1-6 (1f, 1tpf), John Kelly 0-2 (1f), Rian Kennedy 0-1 (f), Oisín Kennedy 0-1, Tom Bailey 0-1	Report	Pts: David Quinn 0-6 (4f), Seán Carroll 1-0, Patrick Kenny 1-0, Lee Deignan 0-1, Darragh Hailstones 0-1, Niall Kenny 0-1	Referee: G Cawley

==== Round 3 ====
15 August 2026 Round 3	Eastern Harps	4-26 (38) – (11) 1-08	Tubbercurry	Collooney
18:30 IST (UTC+1)		(HT: 2-13 – 1-04)		Venue: Connolly Park
	Pts: Aaron Healy 0-10 (2tp), Matt Henry 2-1, Cian Carty 1-2 (1tp), Dylan Walsh 1-1 (1pen), Ronan Mulligan 0-4, S O'Hara 0-2, James Kiernan 0-2, J McHugh 0-2, Alan Davey 0-1, Conor Walsh 0-1	Report	Pts: Josh Flynn 1-4, Aaron Perry 0-1, Luke Gilmartin 0-1, Ben Henry 0-1, Cian Foran 0-1	Referee: Michael Connolly

15 August 2026 Round 3	St Mary's	1-10 (13) – (20) 1-17	Shamrock Gaels	Kilglass
19:30 IST (UTC+1)		(HT: 1-06 – 1-10)		Venue: Enniscrone/Kilglass GAA
	Pts: Nathan Rooney 0-6 (2tpf), Robert O'Kelly Lynch 1-1, Conor Murray 0-1, Kyle Cawley 0-1, Eli Rooney 0-1	Report	Pts: Shane Deignan 1-3, David Quinn 0-6 (5f), Ciarán Kenny 0-3 (1tp), Niall Kenny 0-2, Lee Deignan 0-2, Johnny Quinn 0-1	Referee: M Conway

==== Round 4 ====
22 August 2026 Round 4	Tubbercurry	4-07 (19) – (50) 6-32	Shamrock Gaels	Keash
19:30 IST (UTC+1)		(HT: 0-05 – 1-12)		Venue: Fr Kevin Brehony Park
	Pts: A Perry 2-1 (1pen), O McCann 1-0, B Henry 1-0, J Flynn 0-3, L Gilmartin 0-1, J Flatley 0-1, G Gallagher 0-1	Report	Pts: L Deignan 1-11 (2tp, 1tpf), S Deignan 2-2, D Quinn 0-7 (3f, 1tp), J Brehony 1-0, C Sheridan 1-0, F Quinn 1-0, C Kenny 0-3 (1tp), S Carroll 0-2 (tp), D McDermott 0-2, J Carroll 0-2 (tp), C Kearns 0-2, N Kenny 0-1	Referee: John Griffin

23 August 2026 Round 4	Eastern Harps	0-19 (19) – (20) 1-17	Tourlestrane	Bunnanadden
17:00 IST (UTC+1)				Venue: Bunninadden Community Park
	Pts: M Henry 0-6 (1tpf, 3f), R Mulligan 0-4 (1tp), A Healy 0-3 (1tpf), S O'Hara 0-2, A Davey 0-1, J Kiernan 0-1, C Walsh 0-1, T Taheny 0-1	Report	Pts: C Henry 0-5 (1tpf, 1f), J Kelly 0-5 (2f), C Fleming 1-0, T Bailey 0-3 (1tp), R Kennedy 0-2 (tp), O Kennedy 0-1, M Walsh 0-1	Referee: R Hynes

==== Round 5 ====
5 September 2026 Round 5	Tubbercurry	1-11 (14) – (34) 4-22	Tourlestrane	Curry
19:00 IST (UTC+1)
	Pts: B Henry 1-1, J Flynn 0-3 (2f), A Perry 0-3, L Gilmartin 0-2, N Murphy 0-2	Report	Pts: C Henry 2-2, R Baily 0-6 (1f), J Kelly 0-4 (2f), C Fleming 1-0, M Walsh 1-0, O Kennedy 0-2, T Bailey 0-2, B Walsh 0-2, R Kennedy 0-2, R Walsh 0-1, A O'Hara 0-1	Referee: B Judge

6 September 2026 Round 5	Eastern Harps	0-11 (11) – (13) 1-10	St Mary's	Tubbercurry
17:00 IST (UTC+1)				Venue: Kilcoyne Park
	Pts: A Healy 0-2 (tpf), R Mulligan 0-2 (tp), C Dorrian 0-2, J McHugh 0-1, M Clarke 0-1, J Molloy 0-1, C Walsh 0-1, J Kiernan 0-1	Report	Pts: N Rooney 0-7 (2tpf), K Cawley 1-1, E Rooney 0-1, F Young 0-1	Referee: J Gilmartin

=== Group 2 ===
Advance to semi-finals Advance to quarter-finals Advance to relegation play-off

Team	Matches				Score			Pts
Team	Pld	W	D	L	For	Against	Diff	Pts
Drumcliffe–Rosses Point	4	4	0	0	93	57	+36	8
St Molaise Gaels	4	2	1	1	74	63	+11	5
Coolera–Strandhill	4	1	2	1	77	64	+13	4
Easkey	4	1	1	2	45	79	-34	3
Coolaney /Mullinabreena	4	0	0	4	63	80	-27	0

==== Round 1 ====
31 July 2026 Round 1	Drumcliffe–Rosses Point	0-23 (23) – (21) 1-18	Coolera–Strandhill	Keash
20:00 IST (UTC+1)		(HT: 0-16 – 1-05)		Venue: Fr Kevin Brehony Park
	Pts: Cian Lally 0-10 (2tp, 3f), Michael Carroll 0-4 (2tp), James Donlon 0-3 (1tp), Eamon O'Mahony 0-2, Seán Power 0-2, Niall Collery 0-1, Seán Keane 0-1	Report	Pts: Keelan Harte 0-6 (3tpf), Barry O'Mahony 0-5 (5f), Kevin Banks 0-4 (2tp), Ross Doherty 1-0, Colm Parke 0-2, Ross O'Carroll 0-1	Referee: Ciarán McGovern

2 August 2026 Round 1	Easkey	0-07 (7) – (30) 3-21	Naomh Molaise Gaels	Ballydoogan
14:00 IST (UTC+1)		(HT: 0-05 – 1-14)		Venue: Kent Park
	Pts: Noah Sloyan 0-5 (3f), Rory McHugh 0-1, Joe McHugh 0-1 (f)	Report	Pts: Aaron Lang 0-10 (5f, 1tpf), Oisín Gilmartin 2-3 (1tp), Gerard Brady 1-0, Dante Currid 0-2, Aaron Currid 0-2, Cian Nicholson 0-2, Joseph Keaney 0-1, Keelan Waters 0-1	Referee: Gus Chapman

==== Round 2 ====
9 August 2026 Round 2	Easkey	0-06 (6) – (19) 1-16	Drumcliffe–Rosses Point	Tubbercurry
14:00 IST (UTC+1)		(HT: 0-01 – 0-09)		Venue: Kilcoyne Park
	Pts: Eanna Moylan 0-3 (1tp), Bernard Feeney 0-1, Rory McHugh 0-1, R Sloyan 0-1	Report	Pts: Michael Carroll 0-9 (2tp, 2f), Paul O'Brien 1-1, Niall Collery 0-2, James Donlon 0-1, S Regan 0-1, Eamon O'Mahony 0-1, Adam Ryan 0-1	Referee: B Carty

9 August 2026 Round 2	Coolaney/Mullinabreena	0-17 (17) – (19) 1-16	Naomh Molaise Gaels	Collooney
17:00 IST (UTC+1)		(HT: 0-10 – 1-05)		Venue: Connolly Park
	Pts: Ciarán Gorman 0-4, R Connolly 0-4, Eoghan Barrett 0-3 (1tp), David Barrett 0-2, Niall Connolly 0-2, C Johnston 0-1, B Gorman 0-1	Report	Pts: Aaron Lang 0-8 (1tpf, 1f), Gerard Brady 1-1, Cian Nicholson 0-3, Alan McLoughlin 0-2 (tp), O Delvin 0-1, Dante Currid 0-1	Referee: Barry Judge

==== Round 3 ====
15 August 2026 Round 3	Naomh Molaise Gaels	0-14 (14) – (28) 3-19	Drumcliffe–Rosses Point	Ballymote
18:30 IST (UTC+1)		(HT: 0-07 – 2-11)		Venue: Corran Park
	Pts: Alan McLoughlin 0-4 (1tp), Aaron Lang 0-3 (1f, 1tp), Paul Flynn 0-2, Gerard Brady 0-2, D Carroll 0-1, Oisín Gilmartin 0-1, M Langan 0-1	Report	Pts: Cian Lally 1-3, Michael Carroll 0-5 (1tp), Paul O'Brien 1-1, Adam Ryan 0-4, Jake Chambers 1-0, C McBride 0-1, Eamon O'Mahony 0-1, James Donlon 0-1, R Chambers 0-1, J Campbell 0-1, Cian Oates 0-1	Referee: K Henry

16 August 2026 Round 3	Coolera–Strandhill	4-18 (30) – (15) 0-15	Coolaney/Mullinabreena	Bunnanadden
14:00 IST (UTC+1)		(HT: 2-10 – 0-08)		Venue: Bunninadden Community Park
	Pts: Fola Ayorinde 3-3, Barry O'Mahony 0-7 (5f), Ross Doherty 1-2, Kevin Banks 0-2, C Burke 0-2, P Laffey 0-1, C Murphy 0-1	Report	Pts: Ryan McAuley 0-5 (2tpf), Ciarán Gorman 0-3 (1tp), Conor Johnston 0-3 (1tp), Gavin Gorman 0-2, Niall Connolly 0-1, R Connolly 0-1	Referee: J Gilmartin

==== Round 4 ====
22 August 2026 Round 4	Coolaney/Mullinabreena	1-13 (16) – (23) 1-20	Drumcliffe–Rosses Point	Kilglass
19:30 IST (UTC+1)		(HT: 1-03 – 0-12)		Venue: Enniscrone/Kilglass GAA
	Pts: Eoghan Barrett 1-5 (1tp), Ryan McAuley 0-4 (2tpf), Niall Connolly 0-3 (1tp), Gavin Gorman 0-1	Report	Pts: Paul O'Brien 0-5 (2f), Cian Oates 1-1, James Donlon 0-4 (1tp), Michael Carroll 0-3 (1tp), Stephen Regan 0-2, Cian Lally 0-1, Adam Ryan 0-1, Jake Chambers 0-1, R O'Callaghan 0-1, Eamon Keane 0-1

23 August 2026 Round 4	Coolera–Strandhill	0-15 (15) – (15) 1-12	Easkey	Ballydoogan
14:00 IST (UTC+1)		(HT: 0-06 – 0-07)		Venue: Kent Park
	Pts: B O'Mahony 0-9 (2tpf, 3f), P Laffey 0-2, R Doherty 0-2, R O'Carroll 0-1, N Murphy 0-1	Report	Pts: M Gordon 0-4 (1tp), R Sloyan 1-0, N Sloyan 0-3 (2f), J McHugh 0-2, J Scott 0-2, R McHugh 0-1

==== Round 5 ====
5 September 2026 Round 5	Coolera–Strandhill	0-11 (11) – (11) 0-11	Naomh Molaise Gaels	Corbally
19:00 IST (UTC+1)		(HT: 0-08 – 0-02)		Venue: St Brendan's GAA Park
	Pts: B O'Mahony 0-5 (1tpf, 3f), K Harte 0-2 (tpf), M McDaniel 0-2 (tp), P Laffey 0-1, O Harte 0-1	Report	Pts: G Brady 0-2 (tp), A McLoughlin 0-2 (2f), A Lang 0-2 (1f), P Flynn 0-2, J Keaney 0-1, O Gilmartin 0-1, L Casserly 0-1

6 September 2026 Round 5	Coolaney/Mullinabreena	1-12 (14) – (17) 2-11	Easkey	Bunnanadden
14:00 IST (UTC+1)		(HT: 0-06 – 1-04)		Venue: Bunninadden Community Park
	Pts: C Gorman 0-10 (1tpf, 5f), C Gorman 1-0, C Finan 0-1, N Mullen 0-1	Report	Pts: J McHugh 0-6 (1tpf, 1f), R McKenna 1-1, J Conway 1-0, R Sloyan 0-2, M Gordon 0-1, N Sloyan 0-1	Referee: B Carty

== Knock-out stage ==
The top team in each group qualify for the semi-finals. The second and third placed teams in each group play each other in the quarter-finals.

=== Bracket ===
Quarter-finals
13 September, Collooney
St Mary's	0-17
Coolera–Strandhill	0-15
13 September, Bunnanadden
Naomh Molaise Gaels	3-22
Tourlestrane	2-08

Semi-finals
20 September, Sligo
St Mary's	1-15
Drumcliffe–Rosses Point	0-17
20 September, Sligo
Naomh Molaise Gaels	0-11
Shamrock Gaels	2-21

Final
11 October, Sligo
St Mary's
Shamrock Gaels

=== Relegation semi-finals ===
The two bottom teams in each group play-off in the relegation semi-finals. The losers play each other in the relegation final, with the loser relegated to the 2027 Sligo Intermediate Football Championship.

19 September 2026 Relegation Semi-Final	Easkey	5-15 (30) – (18) 1-15	Tubbercurry	Toorlestraun
17:00 IST (UTC+1)
		Report

19 September 2026 Relegation Semi-Final	Coolaney/Mullinabreena	1-15 (18) – (20) 0-20	Eastern Harps	Bunnanadden
17:00 IST (UTC+1)				Venue: Bunninadden Community Park
		Report

=== Relegation final ===
27 September 2026 Relegation Final	Coolaney/Mullinabreena	1-16 (19) – (15) 0-15	Tubbercurry	Bunnanadden
15:00 IST (UTC+1)				Venue: Bunninadden Community Park

=== Quarter-finals ===
13 September 2026 Quarter-Finals	St Mary's	0-17 (17) – (15) 0-15	Coolera–Strandhill	Collooney
14:00 IST (UTC+1)				Venue: Connolly Park
	Pts: N Rooney 0-4 (2f), E Rooney 0-3 (1tpf), C Davey 0-3 (1tp), R O'Kelly Lynch 0-3, K Cawley 0-2, F O'Hehir 0-1, P Brady 0-1	Report	Pts: B O'Mahony 0-5 (4f), N Murphy 0-2 (tp), P Laffey 0-2, M McDaniel 0-2, R Doherty 0-2, C Gilligan 0-1, F Ayorinde 0-1	Referee: M Duffy

13 September 2026 Quarter-Finals	Naomh Molaise Gaels	3-22 (31) – (14) 2-08	Tourlestrane	Bunnanadden
17:00 IST (UTC+1)		(HT: 2-13 – 1-04)		Venue: Bunninadden Community Park
		Report

=== Semi-finals ===
Semi-final pairs were confirmed on 13 September 2026.

20 September 2026 Semi-Final	Drumcliffe–Rosses Point	0-17 (17) – (18) 1-15	St Mary's	Sligo
13:30 IST (UTC+1)		(HT: 0-07 – 0-09)		Venue: Markievicz Park
	Pts: Cian Lally 0-6 (1tp, 1f) Michael Carroll 0-4 (2tp), Adam Ryan 0-2, Eamon Keane 0-1, Eamon O'Mahony 0-1, Sean Power 0-1, James Donlon 0-1, Cian Oates 0-1	Report	Pts: Nathan Rooney 1-3 (1f), Eli Rooney 0-3, Ronan Niland 0-3, Kyle Cawley 0-3, P Kilcoyne 0-1, Robert O'Kelly Lynch 0-1, Conor Davey 0-1

20 September 2026 Semi-Final	Shamrock Gaels	2-21 (27) – (11) 0-11	Naomh Molaise Gaels	Sligo
15:30 IST (UTC+1)				Venue: Markievicz Park
	Pts: D Quinn 1-14 (4tpf, 3f), N Kenny 1-2, L Deignan 0-2, S Carroll 0-1, J Quinn 0-1, S Deignan 0-1	Report	Pts: A McLoughlin 0-4 (1tp), A Lang 0-3 (2f), J Keaney 0-2, L Casserly 0-1, O Devlin 0-1	Referee: R Hynes

=== Final ===
11 October 2026
15:30 IST (UTC+1)
Final

Report

St Mary's	1-12 (15) – (13) 1-10	Shamrock Gaels
(HT: 1-06 – 0-03)
Pts: Nathan Rooney 0-7 (1tp, 1tpf, 1f), Robert O'Kelly-Lynch 1-0, Eli Rooney 0-2 (1f), Fionn O'Hehir 0-1, Fintan Campbell 0-1, Kyle Cawley 0-1		Pts: Shane Deignan 1-2, David Quinn 0-3 (3f), Ciarán Kenny 0-3 (1tp), Patrick Kenny 0-1, Niall Kenny 0-1

Markievicz Park, Sligo
Referee: Ciarán McGovern

St Mary's	Shamrock Gaels
