= Sligo county football team =

Gaelic football team

Sligo
- Sport: Football
- Irish: Sligeach
- Nickname(s): The Yeats men
- County board: Sligo GAA
- Manager: Dessie Sloyan & Eamonn O'Hara
- Captain: Niall Murphy
- Home venue(s): Markievicz Park, Sligo

Recent competitive record
- Current All-Ireland status: Connacht (QF) in 2025
- Last championship title: None
- Current NFL Division: 3 (5th in 2025)
- Last league title: None
First colours	Second colours

The Sligo county football team (/ˈslaɪɡoʊ/ SLY-goh) represents Sligo in men's Gaelic football and is governed by Sligo GAA, the county board of the Gaelic Athletic Association. The team competes in the three major annual inter-county competitions; the All-Ireland Senior Football Championship, the Connacht Senior Football Championship and the National Football League.

Sligo's home ground is Markievicz Park, Sligo. The team's managers are Dessie Sloyan and Eamonn O'Hara.

The team last won the Connacht Senior Championship in 2007, but has never won the All-Ireland Senior Championship or the National League.

According to Martin Breheny, Sligo routinely has a ranking within the bottom sixteen of county football teams.

== Panel ==
Team as per Sligo vs New York in the Connacht SFC quarter-final, 17 April 2022

No.	Player	Position	Club
1	Aidan Devaney	Goalkeeper	Calry–St Joseph's
2	Mark Walsh	Right corner-back	Owenmore Gaels
3	Evan Lyons	Full-back	Shamrock Gaels
4	Paul McNamara	Left corner-back	St John's
5	Nathan Mullen	Right half-back	Coolaney/Mullinabreena
6	Darragh Cummins	Centre-back	Calry–St Joseph's
7	Paul Kilcoyne	Left half-back	St Mary's
8	Seán Carrabine	Midfield	Castleconnor
9	Peter Laffey	Midfield	Coolera–Strandhill
10	Keelan Cawley (c)^{RET}	Right half-forward	Coolera–Strandhill
11	Niall Murphy	Centre-forward	Coolera–Strandhill
12	Luke Towey	Left half-forward	Naomh Molaise Gaels
13	Mikey Gordon	Right corner-forward	Easkey
14	Paddy O'Connor	Full-forward	St Farnan's
15	Alan Reilly	Left corner-forward	Curry

No.	Player	Position	Club
16	Éamonn Kilgannon	Substitute	St Farnan's
17	David Phillips	Substitute	St Mary's
18	Pat Spillane Jnr	Substitute	St Jude's (Dublin)
19	Donal Conlon	Substitute	Geevagh
20	Conan Marren	Substitute	Tourlestrane
21	Connor Griffin	Substitute	Calry–St Joseph's
22	Ray Donnelly	Substitute	Coolaney/Mullinabreena
23	Barry Gorman	Substitute	Coolaney/Mullinabreena
24	Kenny Gavigan	Substitute	Tourlestrane
25	Gavin Gorman	Substitute	Coolaney/Mullinabreena

^{INJ} Player has had an injury which has affected recent involvement with the county team.
^{RET} Player has since retired from the county team.
^{WD} Player has since withdrawn from the county team due to a non-injury issue.

== Management team ==
Appointed on a three-year term in July 2025:

- Manager: Dessie Sloyan and Eamonn O'Hara
- Backroom team: Con O'Meara and Eamon McGee
- Strength and conditioning coach: Sean Boyle
- Team doctor: Stephen Gilmartin
- Physio and rehabilitation: Alan Dunne
- Kitman: Aidan Carty

== Crest and colours ==
Sligo's team colours are black and white. Sligo's jerseys have alternated between black and white over the years. In the 1990s, Sligo opted for predominantly white shirts with black shorts, with exceptions in 1995 and 1996 when they wore an all-black strip. In 2001, the GAA fined Sligo for not wearing its registered county colours and after a win over Kildare decided to make the all-black kit its first choice.

Sligo's crest features Benbulbin in the background, one of the iconic landmarks of County Sligo.

=== Team sponsorship ===
Clifford Electrical is a former shirt sponsor.

Abbvie has been Sligo's shirt sponsor since the 2016 season, succeeding Radisson.

Period	Kit manufacturer	Shirt sponsor
2011/2?–2015		Radisson
2016–		Abbvie

== History ==
=== 20th century: Two Connacht SFC titles ===
Due to its much smaller population than both County Galway and County Mayo, the two dominant forces in the province of Connacht, and competition from professional League of Ireland soccer team Sligo Rovers in the county's capital town. The county football team has never been able release itself from the shackles inherent in the provincial championship format. It has won the Connacht Senior Football Championship (SFC) on only three occasions, with about 50 years between each win. These championships came in 1928, 1975 and 2007.

Sligo has never appeared in an All-Ireland Senior Football Championship (SFC) final. The 1922 championship is the closest it has come, defeating Roscommon, Mayo and Galway to win the Connacht title, and beating Tipperary in the subsequent All-Ireland semi-final that followed. However an objection from Galway on what is described as "a flimsy technicality" led to the Connacht decider being brought to a replay, which Sligo lost. Sligo met the same fate in the inaugural National Football League campaign of 1926, beating Laois to reach the final, only for Laois to object on the grounds of a Sligo player's name being misspelled; Sligo lost the replay. This gives Sligo the unique position of having qualified for an All-Ireland Senior Football Championship final and a National Football League final, without ever having contested either.

In 1954, Sligo reached the Connacht SFC final against Galway, only for an equalising goal in the final minute to be disallowed. In 1962, Sligo reached the Connacht SFC final against Roscommon, and led for much of the match only to be blighted by a sudden string of injuries, miss a 50 while two points ahead in the final minute, and then gift soon-to-be All-Ireland SFC finalists Roscommon a goal in what is regarded as "one of the great football tragedies in Connacht". In 1965, Sligo reached the Connacht SFC final against Galway and gained a seven-point lead, only for one of its players to be "mysteriously sent to the full-forward spot", causing "the entire team [to lose] momentum" and the match.

The county Vocational Schools team reached two All-Ireland finals in 1962 and 1963, losing both to Dublin City.

In 1975, Sligo won the Connacht SFC for the first time since 1928.

=== 2001–2007: All-Ireland SFC qualifiers and third Connacht SFC title ===
Following the 2001 introduction to the All-Ireland SFC of a qualifier system for teams eliminated from its provincial championship, Sligo — despite historically having a poor record — has had some modest, though noteworthy, success. The revised format, together with a prolonged period of competing in Division 1 of the National Football League, helped bring about an upward turn in the county team's fortunes. In 2002, having narrowly lost the Connacht SFC final to Galway (the defending All-Ireland SFC champions), Sligo went on to defeat Tyrone at Croke Park, turning over a seven-point deficit in the process. A similar comeback against the eventual All-Ireland champions Armagh two weeks later led to a replay, but Sligo's run was halted when it had claims for a penalty in injury time of the second game turned down.

On 8 July 2007, Sligo claimed the Connacht SFC for the first time since 1975 with a one-point victory over Galway.

=== 2007–2018: Series of outside managers ===
Tommy Jordan, who had led Crossmolina Deel Rovers to the 2001 All-Ireland Senior Club Football Championship, took over as manager. The following year the county was trashed by Mayo while trying to retain its Connacht title and ended up in the Tommy Murphy Cup, after a league campaign that had brought relegation to Division 4. Because Sligo had been relegated, the GAA forced the reigning Connacht champions to participate in the Tommy Murphy Cup instead of the All-Ireland SFC qualifiers when it had exited the provincial championship; the county's exit to London in that competition after many players (including the county's most prominent, Eamonn O'Hara) declined to participate, was swiftly followed by Jordan's resignation. O'Hara said he was embarrassed by the team's rapid decline into mediocrity.

On 27 June 2010, Sligo hosted Galway and led 1–8 to 0–2 at halftime but were shocked by an undeserved draw, ending 1–10 each. The replay saw Sligo defeat the Tribesmen by a scoreline of 1–14 to 0–16 to advance to the Connacht SFC final. Once there, after all their hard work and continued misfortune, Roscommon defeated Sligo by a scoreline of 0–14 to 0–13.

Sligo football descended to a new depth on 26 May 2013 when London dumped the county out of the Connacht SFC proper, this time, in its first game. The scoreline was 1–12 to 0–14. This was London's first victory in the Connacht SFC since 1977. Lorcan Mulvey scored the vital London goal.

=== 2018–2020: Taylor era ===
Sligo did not participate in the 2020 championship, granting Galway a direct route to the 2020 Connacht SFC final due to the impact of the COVID-19 pandemic on Gaelic games. Paul Taylor walked away as manager days after the county withdrew from the 2020 Connacht SFC (and 2020 All-Ireland SFC) due to its inability to field a team.

=== 2020–2025: McEntee era ===
Tony McEntee was announced as Taylor's successor. McEntee had been a runner-up for the Antrim vacancy, which he lost to Enda McGinley.

Sligo had a one-sided home defeat to Mayo in the 2021 Connacht SFC quarter-final, but then defeated New York in the 2022 Connacht SFC, a fixture that was returning for the first time since the COVID-19 pandemic. Sligo advanced, losing the subsequent Connacht SFC semi-final to Roscommon. Sligo then participated in the inaugural Tailteann Cup. The team defeated London in Round 1 on a scoreline of Sligo 3–15, London 2–16 (after extra-time). Sligo advanced to a quarter-final (Northern Section) game at Páirc Seán Mac Diarmada against local rival Leitrim. The final scoreline was Leitrim 2–16, Sligo 1–19 (after extra-time), with Sligo winning the game on penalties. The team then met Cavan in the semi-final at Croke Park. Cavan defeated Sligo by a scoreline of 0–20 to 1–14.

In 2023 Sligo had an impressive league campaign securing promotion with 6 wins from 7 in Division 4. They capped off the league with a 2-10 to 0-14 victory in the Division 4 final in Croke Park to secure Sligo's second Division 4 title. In the Connacht championship Sligo accounted comfortably for London and New York (conquerors of Leitrim) securing a place in the Connacht final and in the Sam Maguire series. Unfortunately Sligo could not regain the Nestor cup falling to Galway 0-12 to 2-20. In the All Ireland series a creditable draw with Kildare was followed by defeats to Roscommon and Dublin which ended the season.

Sligo consolidated their position in Division 3 in 2024 finishing 4th. Leitrim were defeated in the Connacht Championship quarter final and following an outstanding display Sligo - who were never behind til the death - were unlucky to be pipped by a late Galway goal in the semi final. Another Tailteann Cup odyssey followed culminating in agonising defeat to Down after extra time in the Croke Park semi final on a scoreline of 2-15 to 1-20.

In 2025 they were beaten by Mayo in the Connacht Quarter-final by 3 points.

McEntee quit his role as manager following Sligo's June quarter-final exit from the 2025 Tailteann Cup to Fermanagh.

In 2026 they were beaten by Leitrim in the Connacht Quarter-final.

In 2027 will be on line up to host New York in the Connacht Quarter-final.

== Managerial history ==
Dates	Name	Co.	Honours
1983–1985	Cyril Haran		—N/a
1986–1988	Tommy Carroll		—N/a
1988–1990	Denis Johnston		—N/a
1990–1991	Paul Clarke		—N/a
1991–1992	Paul Clarke & Tom Conaghan		—N/a
1992–1994	Johnny Stenson & Michael Laffey		—N/a
19??–1996	P. J. Carroll		—N/a
1996–2000	Mickey Moran		—N/a
2000–2003	Peter Ford		—N/a
2003–2004	James Kearins		2004 FBD Insurance League
2004–2006	Dominic Corrigan		—N/a
2006–2007	Tommy Breheny		2007 Connacht Senior Football Championship
2007–2008	Tommy Jordan		—N/a
2008–2013	Kevin Walsh		—N/a
2013–2014	Pat Flanagan		—N/a
2014–2017	Niall Carew		—N/a
2017–2018	Cathal Corey		—N/a
2018–2020	Paul Taylor		—N/a
2020–2025	Tony McEntee		—N/a
2025–	Dessie Sloyan and Eamonn O'Hara		—N/a

== Players ==
=== Notable players ===
- Keelan Cawley, who made 139 appearances over 15 years of involvement, without winning a Connacht SFC medal, and was the team's longest serving player at the time of his retirement in 2024
- Neil Ewing, who gave away the free that cost the team the 2010 Connacht Senior Football Championship, after making his debut in 2008.

=== Records ===
- Mickey Kearins was top scorer in National Football League history for many decades until May 2021, when David Tubridy took the record from him.

=== All Stars ===
Sligo has four All Stars, as of 2010. Each All Star was won by a different player, each representing a different club.

1971: Mickey Kearins (St Pat's)
1974: Barnes Murphy (St Mary's)
2002: Eamonn O'Hara (Tourlestrane)
2010: Charlie Harrison (St John's)

== Honours ==
=== National ===
- All-Ireland Senior Football Championship
  - (bronze) Semi-finalists (2): 1928, 1975
- Tommy Murphy Cup
  - (silver) Runners-up (1): 2004
- Tailteann Cup
  - (bronze) Semi-finalists (1): 2022, 2024
- National Football League Division Three
  - (gold) Winners (1): 2010
- National Football League Division Four
  - (gold) Winners (2): 2009,2023
- All-Ireland Junior Football Championship
  - (gold) Winners (2): 1935, 2010
- All-Ireland Under-20 Football Championship
  - (silver) Runners-up (1): 2023
- All-Ireland Minor Football Championship
  - (silver) Runners-up (1): 1968

=== Provincial ===
- Connacht Senior Football Championship
  - (gold) Winners (3): 1928, 1975, 2007
  - (silver) Runners-up (16): 1920, 1922, 1930, 1932, 1947, 1954, 1956, 1965, 1971, 1981, 1997, 2002, 2010, 2012, 2015, 2023
- Connacht FBD League
  - (gold) Winners (1): 2004
- Connacht Junior Football Championship
  - (gold) Winners (11): 1926, 1928, 1935, 1956, 1973, 1998, 2005, 2010, 2011, 2013, 2014
- Connacht Under-20 Football Championship
  - (gold) Winners (2): 2022, 2023
- Connacht Minor Football Championship
  - (gold) Winners (3): 1949, 1968, 2021
