= Bunninadden GAA =

Sligo-based Gaelic games club

Bunninadden
- Bún an Fheadáin
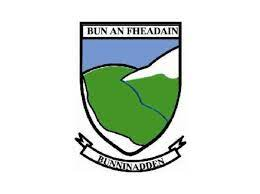
- Founded: 1886
- County: Sligo
- Nickname: the Bunnies
- Colours: Green and White
- Grounds: Bunninadden Community Park

Playing kits
Standard colours

Senior Club Championships
	All Ireland	Connacht champions	Sligo champions
Football:	-	-	2

Bunninadden is a Gaelic Athletic Association club based in the south of the county, comprising the parish of Bunninadden in County Sligo, Ireland.

== History ==
The club was founded in 1886 by Andrew Marren and John O’Dowd.

James Kearins led Bunninadden to a 1999 league title and then to the 2000 Sligo Senior Football Championship title, the club's first for more than eight decades, before being appointed manager of the Sligo county team in 2003.

In 2000, Bunninadden win the Sligo Senior Football Championship and Owen B Hunt cup for the second time in 109 years beating Coolera/Strandhill with a last minute Padraig Doohan goal. In 2006, Bunninadden again reached the county final, defeating rivals Eastern Harps in the semi-final. The final was against fellow south Sligo club Curry, to whom they lost 1–15 to 2–9.

The club reached the intermediate final in 2009 against Geevagh, but lost 1–08 to 1-07. The following 2 campaigns 2010 and 2011 both ended in losses at the semi-final stage against Drumcliffe.

In 2012, with Gerry Perry now at the helm, the club defeated Drumcliffe/Rosses Point to claim a first ever intermediate title for the club.

The club then faced St Aidans of Roscommon in the Connacht semi final in Kiltoom, winning 3–11 to 3–10. In the final, they lost to Charlestown 0–14 to 0-08.

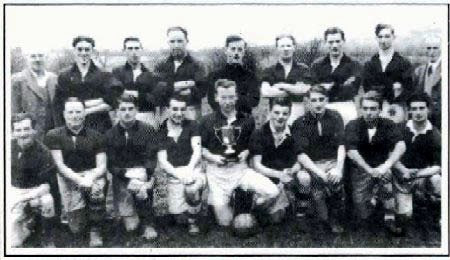
Bunninadden GAA Senior team, 1953

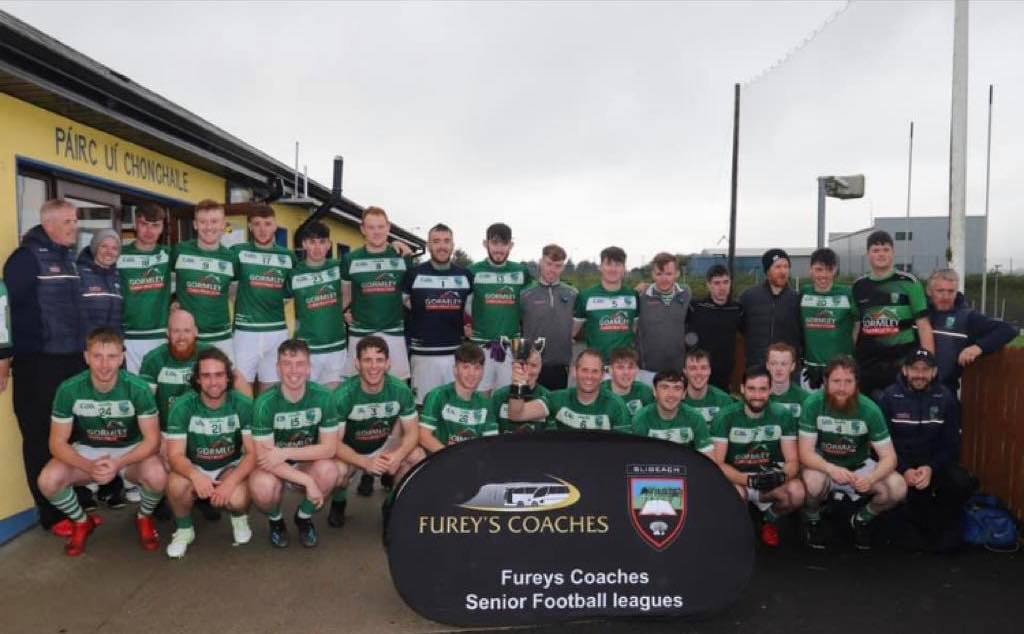
The Bunninadden GAA Senior football team 2020. This team won the Sligo Junior League against Cloonacool.

In 2019 under the stewardship of John O'Flaherty, the club lost in the intermediate final against Geevagh after defeating Easkey in the semi-final.

In 2025, Bunninadden man Luke Marren was part of DCU's Sigerson Cup winning team, scoring two points in their final win against UCD.

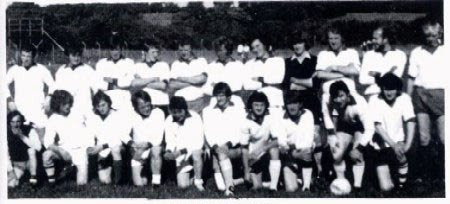
Bunninadden Senior Football team, 1975

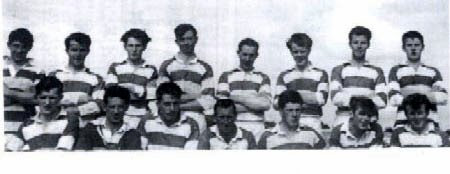
Bunninadden Senior Football team, 1965

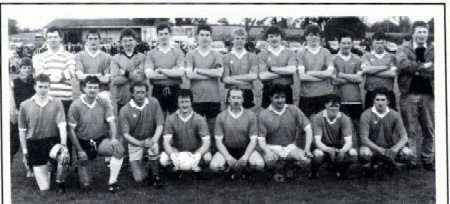
Bunninadden Senior Football Team, 1994

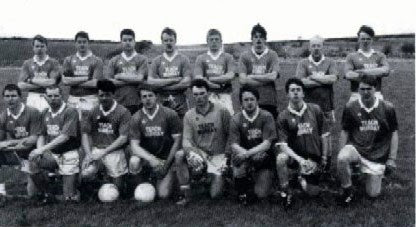
Bunninadden Senior football team, 1995

== Honours ==
- Sligo Senior Football Championship:
  - 1891, 2000
- Sligo Intermediate Football Championship:
  - 2012
- Sligo Junior Football Championship:
  - 1953, 1963, 1973, 1979, 2003, 2008 (Killavil - 1927)
- Sligo Under 20 Football Championship:
  - 1992, 1993 (as St. Nathy's, amalgamated with Coolaney/Mullinabreena), 2022 (amalgamated with Ballymote GAA)
- Sligo Senior Football League (Division 1):
  - 1999, 2004
- Sligo Intermediate Football League Division 3 (ex Div. 2):
  - 1994, 1997, 2021
- Sligo Junior Football League (Division 5):
  - 1979
- Kiernan Cup:
  - 2006
- Sligo Under-14 C Football League
  - 2013
