= Sligo Senior Hurling Championship =

Sports competition in Ireland

- Current season or competition: 2025 Sligo Senior Hurling Championship
- Code: Hurling
- Founded: 1905
- Region: Sligo (GAA)
- No. of teams: 7
- Title holders: Easkey (8th title)
- Most titles: Craobh Rua (27 titles)

The Sligo Senior Hurling Championship is an annual Gaelic Athletic Association competition organised by Sligo GAA among the top hurling clubs in County Sligo. The winner qualifies to represent the county in the Connacht Junior Club Hurling Championship, the winner of which progresses to the All-Ireland Junior Club Hurling Championship. Previously, the winners used to compete in the Connacht Senior Club Hurling Championship but were very unsuccessful at that level. Naomh Eoin hold the records for the most senior championship final defeats in consecutive years (six) in any code in any county. No other team in Ireland has lost six senior finals in six years.

== History ==
=== Teams ===
- Today seven teams play in the competition - Calry/St. Josephs, Coolera/Standhill, Easkey, Naomh Eoin, Naomh Molaise Gaels, Tourlestrane and Western Gaels.

== Format ==
2025 - Addressing an Imbalance of quality of teams

Club hurling has grown in recent years within Sligo, success in the Cuchulainn Leagues (cross-county competitions including Mayo, Roscommon, Longford and Leitrim) has demonstrated this. In 2025 in the Cuchulainn Leagues, Coolera/Standhill won division 2 and Tourlestrane won division 3. At division 1 level Easkey finished 2nd and Naomh Eoin 3rd in the table - noticeable competing competitively with Tuairín of Mayo, considered to be on the level of a Galway Intermediate Level Hurling team. To allow for a wide ranging standard Calry/St. Josephs, Coolera/Standhill, Naomh Molaise Gaels, Tourlestrane and Western Gaels played off to determine 2 spots in the Senior Championship proper along ide Easkey and Naomh Eoin. In 2025, Coolera/Standhill and Western Gaels took the final two spots in the Senior Championship proper. Calry/St. Josephs, Naomh Molaise Gaels and Tourlestrane then proceeded to play in the Junior Championship.

=== Group stage ===
The 4 clubs play each once in the group stage. Two points are awarded for a win, one for a draw and zero for a loss. The teams are ranked in the group stage table by points gained, then scoring difference and then their head-to-head record.

Final: The top two teams contest the final. The winning team are declared champions.

=== Qualification ===
At the end of the championship, the winning team qualify to the subsequent Connacht Junior Club Hurling Championship.

== Teams ==
=== 2026 Teams ===
The 7 teams competing in the 2026 Sligo Senior Hurling Championship were:

Club	Location	Colours	Position in 2026	In championship since	Championship Titles	Last Championship Title
Calry St. Joseph's	Calry	Blue and yellow	Junior	?	11	2017
Coolera-Strandhill	Strandhill	Red and white	Senior Group stage	?	1	2018
Easkey	Easkey	Blue and yellow	Runners-up	?	8	2025
Naomh Eoin	Sligo	Black and red	Champions	?	2	2026
Naomh Molaise Gaels	Cliffoney, Drumcliffe, Maugherow	Green and white	Junior	2024	0	—
Tourlestrane	Toorlestraun	Green and gold	Junior	2024	7	1991
Western Gaels	Castleconnor	Green and white	Senior Group stage	2007	1	2010

=== 2026 Grades ===
Championship	Club
Senior
Senior	Coolera-Strandhill
Senior	Easkey
Senior	Naomh Eoin
Senior	Western Gaels
Junior (failed to qualify for senior)	Calry St. Joseph's
Junior (failed to qualify for senior)	Tourlestrane
Junior (failed to qualify for senior)	Naomh Molaise Gaels
2nd Team	Easkey
Junior (Clubs outside the county invited to play)	Claremorris (Mayo)
Junior (Clubs outside the county invited to play)	Four Masters (Donegal)

== Roll of honour ==
=== By club ===
#	Club	Titles	Runners-up	Championship wins	Championship runner-up
1	Craobh Rua	27	7	1943, 1945, 1949, 1950, 1954, 1955, 1964, 1965, 1966, 1967, 1670, 1971, 1972, 1973, 1974, 1975, 1976, 1978, 1979, 1980, 1982, 1984, 1987, 1989, 1992, 1993, 1994	1969, 1981, 1990, 1991, 1998, 1999, 2000
2	Tubbercurry	13	14	1969, 1977, 1995, 1996, 1997, 1998, 1999, 2000, 2001, 2002, 2003, 2004, 2006	1942, 1965, 1967, 1971, 1972, 1976, 1979, 1980, 1983, 1987, 1992, 2005, 2007, 2011
3	Calry St. Joseph's	11	4	2005, 2007, 2008, 2009, 2011, 2012, 2013, 2014, 2015, 2016, 2017	2002, 2003, 2004, 2006
4	Easkey	8	3	1962, 1963, 2020, 2021, 2022, 2023, 2024, 2025	1984, 2019, 2026
5	Tourlestrane	7	6	1981, 1983, 1985, 1986, 1988, 1990, 1991	1977, 1978, 1982, 1993, 1994, 2001
6	Dromard	6	2	1906, 1907, 1911, 1934, 1935, 1942	1929, 1943
7	Naomh Eoin	2	14	2019, 2026	1985, 1986, 1988, 1989, 1995, 1996, 1997, 2018, 2020, 2021, 2022, 2023, 2024, 2025
8	Western Gaels	1	5	2010	2008, 2009, 2014, 2015, 2017
8	Coolera-Strandhill	1	4	2018	2010, 2012, 2013, 2016
8	Curry	1	1	1936	1934
8	Sligo	1	0	1929	—
8	Sligo United	1	0	1919	—
8	Sligo Wanderers	1	0	1905	—
14	Ballymote	0	3	—	1949, 1950, 1954
14	St. Oliver's	0	1	—	1975
14	Grange	0	1	—	1962

== List of finals ==
=== Legend ===
- Gold – Connacht junior club champions
- Silver – Connacht junior club runners-up

=== List of Sligo SHC finals ===
Year	Winners		Runners-up		#
Year	Club	Score	Club	Score	#
2026	Naomh Eoin	0-17	Easkey Sea Blues	1-13	
2025	Easkey Sea Blues	2-25	Naomh Eoin	1-15	
2024	Easkey Sea Blues	0-15	Naomh Eoin	0-12	
2023	Easkey Sea Blues	0-22	Naomh Eoin	1-15	
2022	Easkey Sea Blues	3-18	Naomh Eoin	1-10	
2021	Easkey Sea Blues	3-21	Naomh Eoin	0-10	
2020	Easkey Sea Blues	1-17	Naomh Eoin	2-13	
2019	Naomh Eoin	1-12	Easkey Sea Blues	0-12	
2018	Coolera/Strandhill	2-25	Naomh Eoin	3-10	
2017	Calry St. Joseph's	2-15	Western Gaels	3-10	
2016	Calry/St. Joseph's	2-18	Coolera/Strandhill	0-04	
2015	Calry/St. Joseph's	0-10	Western Gaels	0-09	
2014	Calry/St. Joseph's	4-14	Western Gaels	0-03	
2013	Calry/St. Joseph's	5-13	Coolera/Strandhill	0-06	
2012	Calry/St. Joseph's	2-16	Coolera/Strandhill	1-11	
2011	Calry/St. Joseph's	2-07	Tubbercurry	0-12	
2010	Western Gaels	2-15	Coolera/Strandhill	2-08	
2009	Calry/St. Joseph's	2-06	Western Gaels	1-06	
2008	Calry/St. Joseph's	4-11	Western Gaels	1-08	
2007	Calry/St. Joseph's	1-20 (AET)	Tubbercurry	1-16 (AET)	
2006	Tubbercurry	0-13	Calry/St. Joseph's	1-08	
2005	Calry/St. Joseph's	1-11	Tubbercurry	2-06	
2004	Tubbercurry	0-11	Calry/St. Joseph's	1-07	
2003	Tubbercurry	3-13	Calry/St. Joseph's	2-11	
2002	Tubbercurry	2-07	Calry/St. Joseph's	2-05	
2001	Tubbercurry	0-10	Tourlestrane	1-04	
2000	Tubbercurry	1-13	Craobh Rua	2-03	
1999	Tubbercurry	1-13	Craobh Rua	1-06	
1998	Tubbercurry	3-15	Craobh Rua	2-09	
1997	Tubbercurry	1-11	Naomh Eoin	3-03	
1996	Tubbercurry	3-09	Naomh Eoin	1-05	
1995	Tubbercurry	0-17	Naomh Eoin	0-07	
1994	Craobh Rua	4-04	Tourlestrane	1-08	
1993	Craobh Rua	3-13	Tourlestrane	0-06	
1992	Craobh Rua	5-07	Tubbercurry	1-10	
1991	Tourlestrane	2-12	Craobh Rua	3-06	
1990	Tourlestrane	0-10	Craobh Rua	0-08	
1989	Craobh Rua	2-11	Naomh Eoin	3-02	
1988	Tourlestrane	5-08	Naomh Eoin	3-11	
1987	Craobh Rua	2-06	Tubbercurry	1-05	
1986	Tourlestrane	5-03	Naomh Eoin	1-09	
1985	Tourlestrane	2-05	Naomh Eoin	0-05	
1984	Craobh Rua	2-06	Easkey	1-05	
1983	Tourlestrane	3-10	Tubbercurry	4-04	
1982	Craobh Rua	4-08	Tourlestrane	1-07	
1981	Tourlestrane	0-10, 1-12 (R)	Craobh Rua	2-04, 4-01 (R)	
1980	Craobh Rua	4-07	Tubbercurry	1-08	
1979	Craobh Rua	6-04, 4-07 (R)	Tubbercurry	5-07, 2-07 (R)	
1978	Craobh Rua		Tourlestrane		
1977	Tubbercurry	3-05 2-04 (R)	Tourlestrane	3-05 0-02 (R)	
1976	Craobh Rua		Tubbercurry		
1975	Craobh Rua		St Oliver's		
1974	Craobh Rua				
1973	Craobh Rua				
1972	Craobh Rua		Tubbercurry		
1971	Craobh Rua	4-06	Tubbercurry	2-08	
1970	Craobh Rua				
1969	Tubbercurry		Craobh Rua/Grange		
1968	No Championship				
1967	Craobh Rua/Grange	3-03	Tubbercurry	1-06	
1966	Craobh Rua/Grange				
1965	Craobh Rua/Grange		Tubbercurry		
1964	Craobh Rua/Grange				
1963	Easkey Sea Blues				
1962	Easkey Sea Blues	3-00	Grange	1-04	
1961	No Championship				
1960	No Championship				
1959	No Championship				
1958	No Championship				
1957	No Championship				
1956	No Championship				
1955	Craobh Rua				
1954	Craobh Rua	5-03	Ballymote	4-01	
1953	No Championship				
1952	No Championship				
1951	No Championship				
1950	Craobh Rua		Ballymote		
1949	Craobh Rua		Ballymote		
1948	No Championship				
1947	No Championship				
1946	No Championship				
1945	Craobh Rua				
1944	No Championship				
1943	Craobh Rua	9-01	Dromard	2-02	
1942	Dromard	7-01	Tubbercurry	3-01	
1941	No Championship				
1940	No Championship				
1939	No Championship				
1938	No Championship				
1937	No Championship				
1936	Curry				
1935	Dromard				
1934	Dromard	5-0	Curry	1-02	
1933	No Championship				
1932	No Championship				
1931	No Championship				
1930	No Championship				
1929	Sligo	15-4	Dromard	0-01	
1928	No Championship				
1927	No Championship				
1926	No Championship				
1925	No Championship				
1924	No Championship				
1923	No Championship				
1922	No Championship				
1921	No Championship				
1920	No Championship				
1919	Sligo United				
1918	No Championship				
1917	No Championship				
1916	No Championship				
1915	No Championship				
1914	No Championship				
1913	No Championship				
1912	No Championship				
1911	Dromard O'Growney's				
1910	No Championship				
1909	No Championship				
1908	No Championship				
1907	Dromard O'Growney's				
1906	Dromard O'Growney's				
1905	Sligo Wanderers				

== Records and statistics ==
=== Recent championships ===
==== 2026 championship ====
Group stage

Pos	Team	Pld	W	D	L	SF	SA	Diff	Pts	Qualification
1	Easkey	3	3	0	0	78	34	44	6	Advance to Final
2	Naomh Eoin	3	2	0	1	92	42	50	4	Advance to Final
3	Coolera-Strandhill	3	1	0	2	34	92	-58	2	
4	Western Gaels	3	0	0	3	27	63	-36	0	

Final

Naomh Eoin 0-17 v Easkey 1-13

==== 2025 championship ====
Group stage

Pos	Team	Pld	W	D	L	SF	SA	Diff	Pts	Qualification
1	Easkey	3	3	0	0	84	38	46	6	Advance to Final
2	Naomh Eoin	3	2	0	1	82	61	21	4	Advance to Final
3	Coolera-Strandhill	3	1	0	2	62	89	-27	2	
4	Western Gaels	3	0	0	3	46	86	-40	0	

Final

Easkey 2-24 (30) v Naomh Eoin 1-15 (18)

==== 2024 championship ====
Group stage

Group 1

Pos	Team	Pld	W	D	L	SF	SA	Diff	Pts	Qualification
1	Easkey	3	3	0	0	121	21	+100	6	Advance to knockout stage
2	Western Gaels	3	2	0	1	52	47	+5	4	Advance to knockout stage
3	Tourlestrane	3	1	0	2	44	59	-15	2	
4	Naomh Molaise Gaels	3	0	0	3	15	105	-90	0	

Group 2

Pos	Team	Pld	W	D	L	SF	SA	Diff	Pts	Qualification
1	Naomh Eoin	2	2	0	0	64	23	+41	4	Advance to knockout stage
2	Coolera-Strandhill	2	1	0	1	36	46	-10	2	Advance to knockout stage
3	Calry-St Joseph's	2	0	0	2	24	55	-31	0	

Knockout stage

Semi-Finals

Naomh Eoin 2-17 (23) v Western Gaels 1-09 (12)

Easkey 4-16 (28) v Coolera-Strandhill 1-9 (12)

Final

Easkey 0-15 (15) v Naomh Eoin 0-12 (12)

==== 2023 championship ====
Group stage

Pos	Team	Pld	W	D	L	SF	SA	Diff	Pts	Qualification
1	Easkey	4	4	0	0	74	31	+43	8	Advance to knockout stage
2	Naomh Eoin	4	3	0	1	83	59	+24	6	Advance to knockout stage
3	Calry-St Joseph's	4	2	0	2	38	47	-9	3	Advance to knockout stage
4	Western Gaels	4	1	0	3	48	96	-48	2	
5	Coolera-Strandhill	4	0	0	4	51	61	-10	-1	

- Calry-St Joseph's and Coolera/Strandhill were deducted a point each for conceding their matches, both to Easkey.

Knockout stage

Semi-Finals

Naomh Eoin 2-18 (24) v Calry-St Joseph's 1-10 (13)

Final

Easkey 0-22 (22) v Naomh Eoin 1-15 (18)

== Sligo Junior Hurling Championship ==
Sligo Junior Hurling Championship
- Code: Hurling
- Region: Sligo (GAA)
- Trophy: Martin Brennan Cup
- No. of teams: 5 (2025)
- Title holders: Tourlestrane (5th title)

The Sligo Junior Hurling Championship (Abbreviated to the Sligo JHC) is an annual hurling competition organised by the Sligo County Board of the Gaelic Athletic Association and contested by the junior clubs in the county of Sligo in Ireland. It is the second tier in the Sligo hurling championship system.

=== List of finals ===
Year	Winners		Runners-up		#
Year	Club	Score	Club	Score	#
2026	Tourlestrane	1-14	Calry-St Joseph's	2-10	
2025	Tourlestrane	2-13	Calry-St Joseph's	1-06	
2024	Coolera/Strandhill	4–23	Western Gaels	5–12	
2023	Tourlestrane	0–13	Naomh Molaise Gaels	0–11	
2022	Western Gaels	5-17	Tourlestrane	1-6	
2021					
2020					
2019	Easkey	3-14	Western Gaels	1-16	
2018	Naomh Eoin	1-16	Calry-St Joseph's	0-8	
2017					
2016					
2015					
2014	Coolera/Strandhill		Tourlestrane		
2013	Tourlestrane	1-6	Western Gaels	1-5	
2012	Tourlestrane				
2011	Tubbercurry	1-09	Coolera/Strandhill	0-10	
2010	Tourlestrane	5-6	Naomh Eoin	0-04	
2006	Naomh Eoin	2-7	Calry-St Joseph's	0-6	
2005	Tourlestrane		Coolera/Strandhill		

=== Roll of honour ===
#	Club	Titles	Runners-up	Championship wins	Championship runner-up
1	Tourlestrane	7	2	2005, 2010, 2012, 2013, 2023, 2025, 2026	2022, 2014
2	Coolera/Strandhill	2	2	2014, 2024	2011, 2005
2	Naomh Eoin	2	1	2006, 2018	2010
3	Western Gaels	1	3	2022	2013, 2019, 2024
3	Tubbercurry	1	0	2011	—
3	Easkey	1	0	2019	—
4	Naomh Molaise Gaels	0	1	—	2023
4	Calry-St Joseph's	0	4	—	2006, 2018, 2025, 2026

== Dermot Molloy League ==
Sligo Dermot Molloy League
- Code: Hurling
- Founded: 1972
- Region: Sligo (GAA)
- Trophy: Dermot Molloy
- No. of teams: 8 (2026)
- Title holders: Naomh Eoin (7th title)

The Dermot Molloy League is an annual Gaelic Athletic Association competition organised by Sligo GAA among all the hurling clubs in County Sligo.

=== List of finals ===
Year	Winner	Score	Opponent	Score
2026	Naomh Eoin	2-14	Easkey	0-09
2025	Naomh Eoin	4-17	Easkey	2-23
	(Naomh Eoin won 8-7 in sudden death penalty pucks)			
2024	Naomh Eoin	2-37	Western Gaels	1-06
2023	Naomh Eoin	0-14	Western Gaels	1-04
2022	Easkey	1-23	Naomh Eoin	1-15
2021	Naomh Eoin	2-26	Carrick Hurling	1-06
2020				
2019	Easkey	3-18	Calry-St Joseph's	3-14
2018	Easkey		Coolera/Strandhill	
2017	Calry-St Joseph's	w/o	Tooreen (Mayo)	src
2016	Castlebar Mitchels (Mayo)	0-14	Calry-St Joseph's	1-10
2015	Tourlestrane	4-7	Coolera/Strandhill	3-9
2014	Tourlestrane	2-10	Calry-St Joseph's	0-11
2013	Calry-St Joseph's		Coolera/Strandhill	
2012	Coolera/Strandhill	3-09	Calry-St Joseph's	0-16
2011	Western Gaels	2-10	Calry-St Joseph's	1-10
2010	Calry-St Joseph's		Coolera/Strandhill	
2009	Western Gaels	1-11	Tourlestrane	2-1
2008	Calry-St Joseph's		Coolera/Strandhill	
2007	Calry-St Joseph's			
2006	Calry-St Joseph's		Tourlestrane	
2005	Calry-St Joseph's		Tourlestrane	
2004	Calry-St Joseph's		Tubbercurry	
2003	Calry-St Joseph's		Tourlestrane	
2002	Calry-St Joseph's	3-11	Tourlestrane	1-09
2001	Calry-St Joseph's	2-06	Tourlestrane	0-11
2000				
1999				
1998				
1997	Craobh Rua	1-14	Naomh Eoin	1-08
1996	Tubbercurry		Naomh Eoin	
1995	Craobh Rua			
1994	Craobh Rua		Naomh Eoin	
1993	Craobh Rua			
1992	Craobh Rua			
1991	Craobh Rua	4-4	Tourlestrane	3-5
1990	Naomh Eoin			
1989	Craobh Rua		Naomh Eoin	
1988	Craobh Rua		St. Annes	
1987	Naomh Eoin			
1986	Craobh Rua		Tourlestrane	
1985	Tourlestrane		Tubbercurry	
1984	Tourlestrane		Craobh Rua	
1983	Tourlestrane		Craobh Rua	
1982	Tourlestrane		Craobh Rua	
1981	Tourlestrane	4-5	Tubbercurry	4-2
1980	Craobh Rua		Tubbercurry	
1979	Craobh Rua		Tourlestrane	
1978				
1977	Craobh Rua			
1976				
1975	Tourlestrane		Easkey	
1974				
1973	Tubbercurry	5-9	Easkey	4-6
1972	Tubbercurry			

Roll of honour

#	Club	Wins	Years won	Last final lost
1	Craobh Rua	12	1977, 1979, 1980, 1986, 1988, 1989, 1991, 1992, 1993, 1994, 1995, 1997	1984
2	Calry-St Joseph's	11	2001, 2002, 2003, 2004, 2005, 2006, 2007, 2008, 2010, 2013, 2017	2019
3	Tourlestrane	8	1975, 1981, 1982, 1983, 1984, 1985, 2014, 2015	2009
4	Naomh Eoin	7	1987, 1990, 2021, 2023, 2024, 2025, 2026	2022
5	Easkey	3	2018, 2019, 2022	2026
5	Tubbercurry	3	1972, 1973, 1996	2004
7	Western Gaels	2	2009, 2011	2024
8	Castlebar Mitchels (Mayo)	1	2016	—
8	Coolera/Strandhill	1	2012	2018
9	Carrick Hurling	0	—	2021
9	Tooreen (Mayo)	0	—	2017
9	St. Annes	0	—	1988

== See also ==
- Sligo Senior Football Championship
- Connacht Junior Club Hurling Championship
