= Sligo Under 21 Football Championship =

Sligo Under-21 Football Championship
- Founded: 1975
- Trophy: Dr. T.J. Lavin Cup
- Title holders: Easkey / Enniscrone
- First winner: Shamrock Gaels
- Most titles: St Mary's (8 titles)

The Sligo Under-21 Football Championship is an annual Gaelic Athletic Association competition between the Under-21 panels of the clubs in Sligo. Up to 2006 this was the Under-21 Championship, but a decision was taken to hold the Championship a year earlier (i.e. for Under-20s), therefore there were two Championships in 2006 - an Under-21 Championship (won by Ballymote), and the Under-20 competition, in which Tourlestrane defeated Eastern Harps in the final. No competition was held in 2014 as it was decided to re-instate the competition in its Under-21 format for 2015. An amalgamated team of Easkey / Enniscrone are the current champions (2019).

== Top winners ==
#	Club	Wins	Years won	Last final lost
1	St Mary's	9	1985, 1986, 2000, 2012, 2013, 2015, 2016, 2018, 2025	2001
2	Tubbercurry	7	1978, 1979, 1980, 1981, 1983, 2007, 2017	2013
3	Shamrock Gaels	4	1975, 1987, 1988, 1989	2018
4	Tourlestrane	3	1976, 2006 (U20), 2008	2017
4	Eastern Harps	3	1994, 1998, 2001	2025
4	Curry	3	1996, 2004, 2005	2011
5	Coolera/Strandhill	2	2002, 2009	2012
5	Owenmore Gaels	2	1982, 1984	n/a
5	St Nathy's (Bunninadden & Coolaney/Muillinabreena)	2	1992, 1993	n/a
5	Easkey/St. Farnan's	2	1995, 1997	2010
5	Ballymote	2	2003, 2006 (U21)	n/a
6	Grange	1	1977	1976
6	Enniscrone	1	1990	n/a
6	Drumcliffe–Rosses Point	1	1991	1992
6	Easkey / Enniscrone	1	2019	2016
6	Calry/St. Joseph's	1	2010	n/a
6	St. John's	1	2011	n/a
6	St. Molaise Gaels	1	2021	2022
6	Bunninadden/Ballymote	1	2022	2021

== Roll of Honour (Under-20/21 'A' Championship) ==
Note - 1975-2006: Under-21, 2006–2013: Under-20, no competition in 2014, 2015–present: Under-21.

Year	Winner	Score	Opponent	Score
2025	St Mary's	1-18	Eastern Harps	3-11
2022	Bunninadden/Ballymote	2-14	St. Molaise Gaels	1-09
2021	St. Molaise Gaels	0-16	Bunninadden/Ballymote	1-11
	Not played due to covid pandemic			
2019	Easkey / Enniscrone	1-15	Eastern Harps	0-12
2018	St Mary's	1-15	Shamrock Gaels	1-14
2017	Tubbercurry	2-12	Tourlestrane	1-14
2016	St Mary's	3-10	Easkey / Enniscrone	3-06
2015	St Mary's	0-08	Tourlestrane	1-03
2014	Not played due to re-structure			
2013	St Mary's	2-12	Tubbercurry	1-11
2012	St Mary's	1-07	Coolera/Strandhill	1-03
2011	St. John's	1-08	Curry	0-07
2010	Calry/St. Joseph's	2-07	Easkey/St. Farnan's	0-10
2009	Coolera/Strandhill	2-12	Tubbercurry	2-08
2008	Tourlestrane	2-13	Curry 1-09	
2007	Tubbercurry/Cloonacool	2-19	Curry	2-04
2006 (U20)	Tourlestrane	0-09	Eastern Harps	0-06
2006 (U21)	Ballymote	1-07	Tubbercurry/Cloonacool	0-07
2005	Curry	2-12	Eastern Harps	1-08
2004	Curry	2-08	Tourlestrane	1-07
2003	Ballymote	1-09	Coolera/Strandhill	0-06
2002	Coolera/Strandhill	1-07	Eastern Harps	1-05
2001	Eastern Harps	1-12	St Mary's	1-09
2000	St Mary's	2-12	Eastern Harps	1-11
1999	No competition			
1998	Eastern Harps	2-06, 2-11 (R)	Easkey/St. Farnan's	2-06, 2-08 (R)
1997	Easkey/St. Farnan's	1-11	Eastern Harps	1-08
1996	Curry		Coolera/Strandhill	
1995	Easkey/St. Farnan's	1-12, 4-07 (R)	Coolera/Strandhill	3-06, 4-06 (R)
1994	Eastern Harps	1-08	Curry	0-09
1993	St Nathy's			
1992	St Nathy's		Drumcliffe–Rosses Point	
1991	Drumcliffe–Rosses Point		Eastern Harps	
1990	Enniscrone	2-02	Castleconnor	0-05
1989	Shamrock Gaels	0-08	Tubbercurry	1-04
1988	Shamrock Gaels	2-10	Tubbercurry	1-08
1987	Shamrock Gaels		St Mary's	
1986	St Mary's		Tourlestrane	
1985	St Mary's		Tourlestrane	
1984	Owenmore Gaels		Tourlestrane	
1983	Tubbercurry	2-08	Eastern Harps	0-09
1982	Owenmore Gaels		Tourlestrane	
1981	Tubbercurry	5-06 (R)	Geevagh	1-08 (R)
1980	Tubbercurry	2-10	Easkey	2-09
1979	Tubbercurry	1-14	St Mary's	2-08
1978	Tubbercurry	3-13	Shamrock Gaels	1-05
1977	Grange	1-05	Tubbercurry	0-05
1976	Tourlestrane		Grange	
1975	Shamrock Gaels		Tourlestrane	

=== Divisional winners ===
County Champions shown in bold type.

Year	East Division	North Division	South Division	West Division
1975	**Shamrock Gaels**	Grange	Tourlestrane	Enniscrone
1976	Shamrock Gaels	Grange	**Tourlestrane**	St. Farnan's
1977	Eastern Harps	**Grange**	Tubbercurry	St. Farnan's
1978	Shamrock Gaels	Grange	**Tubbercurry**	Easkey
1979	Geevagh	St Mary's	**Tubbercurry**	St. Farnan's
1980	Geevagh	Grange	**Tubbercurry**	Easkey
1981	Geevagh	Owenmore Gaels	**Tubbercurry**	Easkey
1982	Geevagh	**Owenmore Gaels**	Tourlestrane	Easkey
1983	Eastern Harps	Coolera/Strandhill	**Tubbercurry**	Easkey
1984	Eastern Harps	**Owenmore Gaels**	Tourlestrane	St. Farnan's
1985		**St Mary's**	Tourlestrane	St. Farnan's
1986		**St Mary's**	Toulestrane	St. Farnan's
1987	**Shamrock Gaels**	St Mary's	Curry	
1988	**Shamrock Gaels**		Tubbercurry	Easkey
1989	**Shamrock Gaels**		Tubbercurry	Castleconnor
1990-94	Open draw			
1995		Coolera/Strandhill	Curry	**Easkey/St. Farnan's**
1996		Coolera/Strandhill	**Curry**	Easkey/St. Farnan's
1997	Eastern Harps	Calry/St. Joseph's	Curry	**Easkey/St. Farnan's**
1998	**Eastern Harps**		Curry	Easkey/St. Farnan's

== Roll of Honour (Under-20/21 'B' Championship) ==
Note - 1998-2006: Under-21, 2006–present: Under-20.

Year	Winner	Score	Opponent	Score
2025	Castleconnor	5-16	Owenmore Gaels	0-15
2022	Curry	1-07	Tubbercurry/Cloonacool	0-06
2009	St Mary's	1-06	Bunninadden	0-06
2008	Shamrock Gaels	0-08	Drumcliffe–Rosses Point	0-05
2007	St. Patrick's, Dromard	2-14	Bunninadden	1-06
2006 (U20)	Naomh Molaise Gaels	0-06, 3-05 (R)	Curry	0-06, 0-11 (R)
2006 (U21)	Naomh Molaise Gaels	3-06	Coolera/Strandhill	1-06
2005	St. Farnan's	w/o	Tubbercurry	scr.
2004	St. John's	2-06	Calry/St. Joseph's	1-05
2003	Shamrock Gaels	0-14	Calry/St. Joseph's	1-08
2002	Ballymote	2-08, 1-08 (R)	Bunninadden	1-11, 1-04 (R)
2001	Tubbercurry	2-14 (R)	Cloonacool	0-09 (R)
2000	Drumcliffe–Rosses Point	3-08	Bunninadden	2-02
1999	No competition			
