= Sligo Senior Football League (Division 1) =

- Founded: 1939
- Trophy: John White Cup
- Title holders: St. Mary's (3rd title)
- First winner: Coolera
- Most titles: Tourlestrane (16 titles)
- Sponsors: Expert Electrical

The Sligo Senior Football League is an annual Gaelic Athletic Association club league competition between the top Sligo clubs, operating in Division 1 of the league. The Senior League has been divided in two since 2004, with Division 1 comprising the leading eight sides, with the remainder in Division 1B, now known as Division 2.

Tourlestrane are the most successful club, having won on 16 occasions, the latest in 2021.

The trophy presented to the winners is the John White Cup.

== Top winners (Division 1/Division 1A) ==
#	Club	Wins	Years won	Last final lost
1	Tourlestrane	16	1971, 1973, 1984, 1992, 2000, 2001, 2009, 2010, 2012, 2013, 2015, 2016, 2017, 2018, 2019, 2021	2025
2	Tubbercurry	9	1950, 1954, 1955, 1957, 1958, 1974, 1987, 1991, 1993	1999
3	Curry	8	1956, 1962, 1964, 1981, 1989, 1996, 2006, 2007	2005
3	St Mary's	8	1977, 1978, 1979, 1982, 1983, 1988, 2014, 2026	1996
4	Easkey	7	1947, 1951, 1952, 1967, 1968–69, 1994, 1998	1997
4	Eastern Harps	7	1990, 1995, 1997, 2002, 2003, 2005, 2008	2026
5	St. Patrick's, Dromard	6	1970, 1972, 1975, 1976, 1980, 1985	1981
6	Coolera/Strandhill	5	1939, 1942, 1946, 1953, 2022	2023
7	Ballisodare	3	1959, 1960, 1961	n/a
7	Shamrock Gaels	3	1986, 2023, 2025	2019
8	Craobh Rua	2	1941, 1943	n/a
8	Skreen	2	1945, 1948	n/a
8	Collooney Harps	2	1963, 1965–66	1964
8	Bunninadden	2	1999, 2004	2002
8	Naomh Molaise Gaels	2	2011, 2024	2021
9	St Columba's	1	1944	n/a

== Roll of Honour (Division 1) ==
During 2010–2012 there were no league finals played. The team finishing top of the league table was deemed the winner.

Year	Winner	Score	Opponent	Score
2026	St Mary's	0-24	Eastern Harps	2-15
2025	Shamrock Gaels	4-22	Tourlestrane	0-13
2024	Naomh Molaise Gaels	2-10	Tourlestrane	0-09
2023	Shamrock Gaels	5-14	St Mary's	3-17
2022	Coolera/Strandhill	1–16	Tourlestrane	0–08
2021	Tourlestrane	0–06	Naomh Molaise Gaels	0–04
2020	Competition not played (Covid19)			
2019	Tourlestrane	0–16	Shamrock Gaels	2–08
2018	Tourlestrane	2–15	Cooloney Harps	2–08
2017	Tourlestrane	0–17	Tubbercurry	0–15
2016	Tourlestrane	0–15	Naomh Molaise Gaels	1–11
2015	Tourlestrane	0–16	Tubbercurry	0–12
2014	St Mary's	0–13	Tourlestrane	1–08
2013	Tourlestrane	0–15	St. John's	1–08
2012	Tourlestrane		(League basis only)	
2011	Naomh Molaise Gaels		(League basis only)	
2010	Tourlestrane		(League basis only)	
2009	Tourlestrane	1–12	Eastern Harps	0–08
2008	Eastern Harps	0–13	Tourlestrane	0–09
2007	Curry	1–07	Tourlestrane	0–06
2006	Curry	0–09	Tourlestrane	0–07
2005	Eastern Harps	1–12	Curry	0–05
2004	Bunninadden	1–09	Eastern Harps	1–08
2003	Eastern Harps	1–09	Curry	1–07
2002	Eastern Harps	2–11	Bunninadden	1–05
2001	Tourlestrane	0–12	Curry	1–06
2000	Tourlestrane	0–11	Eastern Harps	0–05
1999	Bunninadden	0–09, 0–09 (R)	Tubbercurry	0–09, 0–03 (R)
1998	Easkey	1–12	Curry	1–04
1997	Eastern Harps	4–10	Easkey	1–06
1996	Curry	2–05	St Mary's	0–08
1995	Eastern Harps	1–10	Easkey	0–09
1994	Easkey	2–10	Tubbercurry	1–11
1993	Tubbercurry	0–10, 1–08 (R)	Eastern Harps	0–10, 0–08 (R)
1992	Tourlestrane	3–08	Drumcliffe–Rosses Point	1–09
1991	Tubbercurry	1–14, 0–08 (R)	Shamrock Gaels	1–14, 1–04 (R)
1990	Eastern Harps	1–16	Easkey	3–04
1989	Curry		(League basis only)	
1988	St Mary's	2–03	Geevagh	0–05
1987	Tubbercurry	0–13	Geevagh	0–06
1986	Shamrock Gaels	1–06	Tubbercurry	0–07
1985	St. Patrick's, Dromard	0–06	Tourlestrane	0–05
1984	Tourlestrane	0–07	Tubbercurry	0–05
1983	St Mary's	0–09	Curry	1–03
1982	St Mary's	0–12	Curry	1–06
1981	Curry	1–08	St. Patrick's, Dromard	2–03
1980	St. Patrick's, Dromard	2–11	Tourlestrane	2–05
1979	St Mary's	1–08	Coolera	0–05
1978	St Mary's		Curry	
1977	St Mary's	1–07	Tubbercurry	0–09
1976	St. Patrick's, Dromard		Coolera	
1975	St. Patrick's, Dromard	0–13	Curry	0–06
1974	Tubbercurry	0–11	Tourlestrane	0–10
1973	Tourlestrane	2–05	Curry	1–05
1972	St. Patrick's, Dromard		Tourlestrane	
1971	Tourlestrane	3–05	Mullinabreena	2–04
1970	St. Patrick's, Dromard		Collooney/Ballisodare	
1968–69	Easkey		Bunninadden	
1967	Easkey	2–10	Bunninadden	2–02
1965–66	Cooloney Harps	3–08	Bunninadden	1–04
1964	Curry		Cooloney Harps	
1963	Cooloney Harps	2–06	Sooey	0–10
1962	Curry	2–09	Cooloney Harps	2–06
1961	Ballisodare	1–10	Mullinabreena	2–06
1960	Ballisodare		Curry	
1959	Ballisodare	1–06	Sooey	1–02
1958	Tubbercurry	2–05	Sooey	1–05
1957	Tubbercurry	1–08	Sooey	1–04
1956	Curry		Tubbercurry	
1955	Tubbercurry		Curry	
1954	Tubbercurry	1–09	Keash	1–02
1953	Coolera/Strandhill	2–06	Tubbercurry	2–05
1952	Easkey	2–07	Ballymote	0–05
1951	Easkey		Ballymote	
1950	Tubbercurry	2–04	Coolera/Strandhill	1–04
1949	Not played			
1948	Skreen	1–04	Coolera/Strandhill	0–05
1947	Easkey		Tubbercurry	
1946	Coolera/Strandhill	0–03, 3–03 (R)	Tubbercurry	0–03, 1–04 (R)
1945	Skreen	3–05	Tubbercurry	0–02
1944	St Columba's	2–08	Knockalassa	0–01
1943	Craobh Rua	4–05	Knockalassa	1–02
1942	Coolera/Strandhill	1–04	Derroon	1–03
1941	Craobh Rua	3–04	Derroon	0–05
1940	No winner declared			
1939	Coolera/Strandhill	1–03	Tubbercurry	1–01

== Top winners (Division 1B) ==
#	Club	Wins	Years won	Last final lost
1	Coolera/Strandhill	2	2005, 2007	n/a
2	Castleconnor	1	2004	n/a
2	Bunninadden	1	2006	n/a

== Roll of Honour (Division 1B) ==
Year	Winner	Score	Opponent	Score
2007	Coolera/Strandhill	2–13	Tubbercurry	1–09
2006	Bunninadden	3–09	Easkey	0–07
2005	Coolera/Strandhill	0–09	Tubbercurry	0–07
2004	Castleconnor	1–09	Ballymote	0–08
