= Sligo Intermediate Football League Division 3 (ex Div. 2) =

Sligo Football League Division 3 (ex Division 2)
- Founded: 1979
- Title holders: Cloonacool (2nd title)
- Most titles: Enniscrone (4 titles)
- Sponsors: Expert Electrical

The Sligo Football League is an annual Gaelic Athletic Association club league competition between the lower ranking Sligo clubs, operating in Division 3 of the league. Since its inception in 1979 up to 2003, it was regarded as Division 2 of the league. Since 2004 this has been altered, with a number of Intermediate teams playing in the higher Divisions (1A and 1B), and Division 2 itself was split in 2006, into Division 2A and Division 2B. The Divisions have been renamed for 2008, and are now Divisions 1 to 5.

Enniscrone are the most successful club, having won on 4 occasions, the last in 2004. Naomh Molaise Gaels, twice previous winners under their old incarnation as Grange/Cliffoney, won in 2008 after defeating St John's in the final.

== Top winners (Division 3) ==
#	Club	Wins	Years won	Last final lost
1	Enniscrone	4	1986, 1988, 1996, 2004	1987
2	Shamrock Gaels	3	1979, 1985, 2000	n/a
2	Naomh Molaise Gaels (formerly Grange–Cliffoney)	3	1987, 2001, 2008	2000
2	Castleconnor	3	1990, 1992, 1998	1997
3	Drumcliffe–Rosses Point	2	1991, 2009	2006
3	Eastern Harps	2	1983, 2003	2009
3	Geevagh	2	1984, 2007	1994
3	Coolera/Strandhill	2	1989, 1995	1985
3	Bunninadden	2	1994, 1997	1991
3	Cloonacool	2	1999, 2011	2001
3	Owenmore Gaels	2	1982, 2012	1986
3	Calry/St. Joseph's	2	2005, 2026	1995
5	Curry	1	1980	n/a
5	Easkey	1	1981	n/a
5	St Patrick's, Dromard	1	1993	1999
5	Tubbercurry	1	2002	n/a
5	St John's	1	2006	2008
6	St Farnan's GAA	0	-	2026

== Roll of honour ==
Year	Winner	Score	Opponent	Score
2026	Calry/St. Joseph's	2-11	St Farnan's GAA	0-14
2014				
2013				
2012	Cloonacool		n/a	
2011	Owenmore Gaels		n/a	
2010			n/a	
2009	Drumcliffe–Rosses Point	1-13	Eastern Harps	2-09
2008	Naomh Molaise Gaels	1-10	St John's	0-10
2007	Geevagh	0-14	Eastern Harps	0-12
2006	St John's	1-10	Drumcliffe–Rosses Point	1-09
2005	Calry/St.Joseph's	0-08	St Farnan's	1-02
2004	Enniscrone	1-10	Cooloney/Mullinabreena	1-08
2003	Eastern Harps	0-09	Ballymote	0-08
2002	Tubbercurry	2-08	Eastern Harps	0-08
2001	Grange–Cliffoney	1-12	Cloonacool	0-05
2000	Shamrock Gaels	0-12	Grange–Cliffoney	0-09
1999	Cloonacool	1-05	St Patrick's, Dromard	0-06
1998	Castleconnor	1-11	Grange–Cliffoney	1-03
1997	Bunninadden	1-11	Castleconnor	0-03
1996	Enniscrone	1-13	St Patrick's, Dromard	3-03
1995	Coolera/Strandhill	2-10	Calry/St.Joseph's	1-07
1994	Bunninadden	1-14	Geevagh	0-03
1993	St Patrick's, Dromard	1-09	Mullinabreena	1-06
1992	Castleconnor	0-11, 0-07 (R)	Grange–Cliffoney	1-08, 1-03 (R)
1991	Drumcliffe–Rosses Point	0-09, 0-15 (R)	Bunninadden	0-09, 0-12 (R)
1990	Castleconnor	0-07	Grange	0-05
1989	Coolera/Strandhill	(League basis only)		
1988	Enniscrone	2-08	Tourlestrane	2-07
1987	Grange	3-04	Enniscrone	1-08
1986	Enniscrone	4-09	Owenmore Gaels	2-03
1985	Shamrock Gaels 1-08	Coolera/Strandhill 0-09		
1984	Geevagh	1-08	Owenmore Gaels	2-04
1983	Eastern Harps	1-05	Owenmore Gaels	0-04
1982	Owenmore Gaels	2-05	Geevagh	1-05
1981	Easkey	1-07	Owenmore Gaels	0-03
1980	Curry	2-10	Bunninadden	1-03
1979	Shamrock Gaels	(League basis)		
