= Noel Mullaney =

Irish Gaelic footballer (1937–2025)

Personal information
- Native name: Nollaig Ó Maoileanaigh (Irish)
- Born: 1937 Sooey, County Sligo, Ireland
- Died: 6 September 2025 (aged 87–88) Sligo, Ireland

Sport
- Sport: Gaelic football
- Position: Goalkeeper
Clubs
- Years: Club
- Sooey; Shamrock Gaels; St Michael's
Club titles
- Sligo titles: 1
Inter-county
- Years: County
- 1958–1966: Sligo
Inter-county titles
- Connacht titles: 0
- All-Irelands: 0
- NFL: 0

Noel Mullaney (1937 – 6 September 2025) was an Irish Gaelic footballer. At club level, he played with Sooey and Shamrock Gaels and at inter-county level with the Sligo senior football team.

== Career ==
Mullaney's career began at club level with Sooey, with whom he won a Sligo SFC medal in 1959. By that stage he had already made his first appearance on the inter-county scene as goalkeeper with the Sligo senior football team. Mullaney represented Connacht in the Railway Cup and also lined out in a tournament game in Wembley Stadium in 1966. When the Sooey club was disbanded in 1971, he spent a number of years as player and coach with Shamrock Gaels before being a founder-member of the St Michael's club in 1983.

== Death ==
Mullaney died on 6 September 2025, at the age of 88.

== Honours ==
Sooey

- Sligo Senior Football Championship: 1959
