= Sligo Junior Football Championship =

Annual Gaelic football competition

- Irish: Craobh Soisear Peile; Co. Shligigh
- Title holders: Cloonacool GAA (2nd title)
- Most titles: St Patrick's (8 titles)
- Sponsors: Connacht Gold

The Sligo Junior Football Championship is an annual Gaelic football competition contested by lower-tier Sligo GAA clubs.

St Patrick's (formerly Skreen) have the most titles with eight.

Cloonacool GAA are the title holders (2025) defeating Eastern Harps in the Final after a replay.

== Honours ==
The winners of the Sligo Junior Championship qualify to represent their county in the Connacht Junior Club Football Championship. The winners of that in 2018 were Easkey and stalwart Eugene Mullen captained them to that.

St Johns, who won the Junior Title in 1999 also won the Connacht Championship by beating Monivea Abbey in the final in Tuam before the FBD final.

The winners can, in turn, go on to play in the All-Ireland Junior Club Football Championship. Easkey got to the All-Ireland final in 2019. But they lost to Beaufort when they were there. That was played at Croke Park.

The winners are promoted to the Sligo Intermediate Football Championship for the following year.

== History ==
In 2009 the Junior Championship was restructured. For the first time since 2001 there would be two championships, A and B. The A Championship was made up of the semi-finalists in 2008 and relegated teams from the Intermediate Championship. The winner of the A Championship is promoted to Intermediate football. The relegated teams from Intermediate drop down to Junior A and in 2009 three teams were relegated. The B Championship was run on a knockout basis with nine teams entering. The winner of the B Championship is promoted to A for the following year.

Eamonn O'Hara, one of Sligo's All Star footballers, played in the 2016 final and he scored 2-1 before the first half ended.

== List of finals ==
Year	Winner	Opponent
2026	Owenmore Gaels 1-14	St Michaels 0-16
2025	Cloonacool 1-15	Eastern Harps 1-14
2024	Ballymote Round Towers 0-10, 0-12 (R)	Cloonacool 1-7, 1-5 (R)
2023	Owenmore Gaels 1-13	Ballymote 0-12
2022	Shamrock Gaels	Naomh Molaise Gaels
2021	St Patrick's	
2020	Tourlestrane 2-12	Owenmore Gaels 0-8
2019	St Michael's 1-13	Tourlestrane 1-10
2018	Easkey	
2017	Ballymote	Tourlestrane
2016	St Michael's 4-12	Tourlestrane 2-05
2015	Tourlestrane	
2014	St Mary's 2-12	Owenmore Gaels 1-10
2013	St johns 3-8	St marys 1-9
2012	Cloonacool 2-9	St johns 2-8
2011	Curry 1-5	St Mary's 0-7
2010	St Patrick's 1-9	Curry 1-6
2009	Ballisodare 0-12	Shamrock Gaels 0-11
2008	Bunninadden 1-10	Shamrock Gaels 0-5
2007	Coolera/Strandhill 1-12	Tubbercurry 2-7
2006	Drumcliffe–Rosses Point 1-6, 2-9 (R)	Castleconnor 1-6, 1-7 (R)
2005	St Farnan's 1-10	Bunninadden 1-8
2004	Tourlestrane 2-7	Shamrock Gaels 0-10
2003	Bunninadden 3-17	Castleconnor 2-10
2002	Castleconnor 1-15, 0-12 (R)	Bunninadden 3-9, 0-9 (R)
2001	Grange/Cliffoney 0-14	Eastern Harps 1-7
2000	St Mary's 2-7	Ballisodare 1-9
1999	St John's 0-15	Maugherow 2-4
1998	Geevagh 1-14	Maugherow 2-5
1997	St Farnan's 1-15	Maugherow 2-11
1996	St Mary's 2-13	Shamrock Gaels 2-1
1995	Tubbercurry 1-5	Shamrock Gaels 0-6
1994	Eastern Harps 2-10	Drumcliffe–Rosses Point 2-7
1993	St Mary's 4-6	Eastern Harps 1-13
1992	St Michael's 3-6, 0-13 (R)	Tubbercurry 1-12, 1-5 (R)
1991	Maugherow 2-11	St Michael's 1-11
1990	Drumcliffe–Rosses Point 2-10	Maugherow 1-8
1989	St John's 0-14	Cliffoney 1-9
1988	Mullinabreena 1-9	Ballymote 1-6
1987	Calry-St Joseph's 3-8	Ballymote 1-4
1986	Tourlestrane 0-11	Maugherow 0-9
1985	Castleconnor 2-6	St Mary's 0-6
1984	Mullinabreena 0-10	Calry Gaels 0-5
1983	St Farnan's 1-10	Calry Gaels 2-0
1982	Northern Gaels 1-10	St Farnan's 1-8
1981	Geevagh 2-6	Tourlestrane 0-1
1980	Castleconnor 0-9	Tourlestrane 1-3
1979	Bunninadden 1-7	Castleconnor 0-3
1978	Carraroe 3-5	Tourlestrane 0-6
1977	Easkey 3-8	Tourlestrane 0-1
1976	Calry Gaels 1-9	Easkey 0-7
1975	Grange 4-15	Enniscrone 0-4
1974	Geevagh 1-10	Tourlestrane 0-2
1973	Bunninadden 3-2	Grange 1-7
1972	St Farnan's 1-9, 0-13 (R)	Craobh Rua 0-12, 0-7 (R)
1971	Coolera 2-10	St Farnan's 1-2
1970	Keash 2-7	Coolera 0-6
1969	Grange 2-8, 1-7 (R)	Knockalassa 1-5, 1-6 (R)
1968	Mullinabreena 0-7	Knockalassa 0-3
1967	St Patrick's 1-8	Keash 0-3
1966	Enniscrone 2-8	Ballisodare 0-5
1965	Easkey 2-5	Grange 0-5
1964	St Patrick's 1-8	Easkey 2-2
1963	Bunninadden 1-8	Cliffoney 1-4
1962	Collooney Harps 2-7	St Patrick's 1-6
1961	Keash 1-5, 2-6 (R)	Coolera 2-2, 0-2 (R)
1960	Easkey 2-9	Keash 0-2
1959	Grange 1-4	Ballymote 0-5
1958	Drumcliffe 1-6	Tubbercurry 0-1
1957	Mullinabreena 2-5	Easkey 2-4
1956	Ballisodare 2-3	Kilglass 1-3
1955	Curry 1-6	Ballisodare 0-0
1954	Tourlestrane 0-6	Mental Hospital 0-4
1953	Bunninadden 5-2	Curry 0-4
1952	Keash/Dromard	(shared)
1951	Knockalassa 2-2	Dromard 1-2
1950	Skreen 1-4	Keash 1-3
1949	Coolera 2-2	Keash 1-2
1948	Enniscrone	Grange
1947	Keash	Maugherow
1946	Tourlestrane	Collooney Harps
1945	Derroon 3-3	Templeboy 0-5
1944	Gurteen 1-9	Dromore West 1-2
1943	Templeboy 0-3	Killoran 0-2
1942	Keash 1-5	Dromore West 1-4
1941	Maugherow 4-6	Gurteen 1-7
1940	Skreen 2-7	Geevagh 1-3
1939	Ballisodare	Coolaney
1938	Aclare	Maugherow
1937	Teeling 1-8	Gurteen 1-6
1936	Geevagh 2-5	Teeling 2-4
1935	Derroon	Grange
1934	Drumcliffe 2-5	Broher 0-2
1933	Maugherow	
1932	Knockalassa	Gurteen
1931	Skreen	Sligo
1930	Collooney Harps 2-4	Curry 0-2
1929	Ballisodare 1-2, 4-5 (R)	Curry 2-3, 0-1 (R)
1928	Skreen Emeralds	Ballyrush
1927	Killavil	Derroon
1926	Competition abandoned	
1925	Ballyrush	Ballymote Round Towers
1924	Dromore West	Collooney Harps
1923	No competition	
1922	No competition	
1921	No competition	
1920	No competition	
1919	Templeboy	Tubbercurry
1918	Dromore West	Sligo
1917	Cuilmore	Templeboy
1916	Coolera 1-3	Tubbercurry 1-2
1915	No competition	
1914	No competition	
1913	No competition	
1912	No competition	
1911	No competition	
1910	Mullinabreena	Emlaghnaughton
1909	Not completed	
1908	No competition	
1907	Easkey	

== Roll of honour ==
#	Club	Wins	Years won	Last final lost
1	Skreen (now St Patrick's)	8	1928, 1931, 1940, 1950, 1964, 1967, 2010, 2021	1962
2	Bunninadden	6	1953, 1963, 1973, 1979, 2003, 2008	2005
2	Tourlestrane	6	1946, 1954, 1986, 2004, 2015, 2020	2019
4	Coolaney/Mullinabreena	5	1910, 1957, 1968, 1984, 1988	—N/a
4	Keash	5	1942, 1947, 1952 (shared), 1961, 1970	1967
4	Easkey	5	1907, 1960, 1965, 1977, 2018	1976
7	Coolera/Strandhill	4	1916, 1949, 1971, 2007	1970
7	Ballisodare	4	1929, 1939, 1956, 2009	2000
7	Drumcliffe–Rosses Point	4	1934, 1958, 1990, 2006	1994
7	Geevagh	4	1936, 1974, 1981, 1998	1940
7	Grange (now St Molaise Gaels)	4	1959, 1969, 1975, 2001	2022
7	St Farnan's	4	1972, 1983, 1997, 2005	1982
7	St Mary's	4	1993, 1996, 2000, 2014	2013
7	Derroon (now Ballymote)	4	1935, 1945, 2017, 2024	2023
15	Maugherow	3	1933, 1941, 1991	1999
15	Castleconnor	3	1980, 1985, 2002	2006
15	St John's	3	1989, 1999, 2013	2012
15	St Michael's	3	1992, 2016, 2019	2026
19	Dromore West	2	1918, 1924	1944
19	Templeboy	2	1919, 1943	1945
19	Collooney Harps	2	1930, 1962	1946
19	Knockalassa	2	1932, 1951	1969
19	Enniscrone/Kilglass	2	1948, 1966	1975
19	Curry	2	1955, 2011	2010
19	Calry-St Joseph's	2	1976, 1987	1984
19	Cloonacool	2	2012, 2025	2024
19	Owenmore Gaels	2	2023, 2026	2020
28	Cuilmore	1	1917	—N/a
28	Ballyrush	1	1925	1928
28	Killavil	1	1927	—N/a
28	Aclare	1	1938	—N/a
28	Gurteen	1	1944	1941
28	Carraroe	1	1978	—N/a
28	Northern Gaels	1	1982	—N/a
28	Eastern Harps	1	1994	2025
28	Tubbercurry	1	1995	2007
28	Dromard	1	1952 (shared)	1951
28	Shamrock Gaels	1	2022	2009

=== Junior B Championship ===
Junior b tournament played off with teams second and third teams . St johns have won the most times with 3 victories since the formation of the competition in 2009 Roll of honor only goes as far as 2011, needs updating.

#	Club	Wins	Years won	Last final lost
1	Curry	2	1997, 2001	2000
2	St Mary's	3	1998,2019	—N/a
2	Shamrock Gaels	3	1999	2011
2	Easkey	3	2000	2001
2	St John's	3	2009 2013 2016	—N/a
2	Calry-St Joseph's	3	2010	—N/a
2	Geevagh	3	2011	—N/a

Year	Winner	Opponent
1997	Curry 0-12	Enniscrone/Kilglass 1-4
1998	St Mary's 3-10	Tubbercurry 0-6
1999	Shamrock Gaels 3-7	Curry 2-6
2000	Easkey 2-10	Curry 1-10
2001	Curry 0-11	Easkey 1-4
2009	St John's 3-10	Ballymote 0-7
2010	Calry-St Joseph's w/o	Enniscrone/Kilglass scr
2011	Geevagh 1-4	Shamrock Gaels 1-3
2012		
2013	st johns 3-11	tourlestrane 0-8 (replay)
2014		
2015		
2016	st johns 2-15	easkey 0-4
2017		
2018		
2019	St Mary's 0-15	Owenmore Gaels 1-05
2020		
2021		
2022		
2023
2024
2025	Coolera-Strandhill 2-11	Coolaney-Mullinabreena 1-8
2026	Ballymote 4-9	Coolaney-Mullinabreena 0-14
