= Sligo Intermediate Football League (Division 4) =

Sligo Football League Division 4
- Founded: 2006
- Title holders: Tourlestrane (1st title)
- First winner: Owenmore Gaels

The Sligo Football League, Division 4, is an annual Gaelic Athletic Association club league competition between the Sligo clubs operating in what is effectively the second tier of the Intermediate League (the higher of the two being Division 3). This League was introduced in 2006 as Division 2B, with Owenmore Gaels the first winners. St. Molaise Gaels were champions in 2008. It has been renamed as Division 4 since the 2008 season.

Since its inception in 1979 up to 2003, it was regarded as Division 2 of the league. Since 2004 this has been altered, with a number of Intermediate teams playing in the higher Divisions (1A and 1B), and Division 2 itself was split in 2006, into Division 2A and Division 2B. The Divisions have been renamed for 2008, and are now Divisions 1 to 5.

== Top winners ==
Team	Years won	Last final lost
Owenmore Gaels	2006	n/a
Curry	2007	2009
Naomh Molaise Gaels	2008	n/a
Tourlestrane	2009	n/a

== Roll of honour ==
Year	Winner	Opponent
2009	Tourlestrane 2-11	Curry 0-10
2008	Naomh Molaise Gaels 2-6	Coolaney/Mullinabreena 0-08
2007	Curry 1-9	Cloonacool 2-03
2006	Owenmore Gaels 3-10	Coolera/Strandhill 3-07
