= Tubbercurry GAA =

Sligo-based Gaelic games club

- Tobar an Choire
- Founded: 1888
- County: Sligo
- Colours: Black and White
- Grounds: Kilcoyne Park
- Coordinates: 54°03′33″N 8°43′25″W

Playing kits
Standard colours

Senior Club Championships
	All Ireland	Connacht champions	Sligo champions
Football:	-	-	20
Hurling:	-	-	14

Tubbercurry is a Gaelic Athletic Association club based in the town of Tubbercurry, County Sligo; the club was formed in 1888. They have won 20 Sligo Senior Football Championships and 14 Sligo Senior Hurling Championships. They have also won 9 Sligo Senior Football League (Division 1) titles. At underage they have won 10 Sligo Minor Football Championships and 7 Sligo Under 20 Football Championships. One of the greatest hurlers in Sligo history, Paul Seevers played with the club for a number of years winning many medals with both the Gaelic football and Hurling teams. The club combines with Cloonacool at underage level.

== Notable players ==
- Brendan Kilcoyne, captained Tubberycurry to the 1991 Sligo Senior Football Championship, and also won the 1986 Sligo Senior Football Championship with the club

== Honours ==
- Sligo Senior Football Championship: (20)
  - 1890, 1917, 1918, 1924, 1927, 1928, 1930, 1934, 1938, 1939, 1940, 1946, 1950, 1951, 1955, 1957, 1976, 1986, 1991, 2014
- Sligo Senior Hurling Championship: (13)
  - 1969, 1977, 1995, 1996, 1997, 1998, 1999, 2000, 2001, 2002, 2003, 2004, 2006
- Sligo Junior Football Championship: (2)
  - 1995, 2024
- Sligo Under 21 Football Championship: (7)
  - 1978, 1979, 1980, 1981, 1983, 2007, 2017
- Sligo Minor Football Championship: (10)
  - 1942, 1953, 1955, 1959, 1974, 1976, 1977, 1978, 1994, 2005
- Sligo Under-16 Football Championship: (3)
  - 1959, 1961, 1993
- Sligo Under-14 Football Championship: (4)
  - 1975, 1991, 2010, 2015
- Sligo Senior Football League (Division 1): (9)
  - 1950, 1954, 1955, 1957, 1958, 1974, 1987, 1991, 1993
- Kiernan Cup: (2)
  - 2014, 2018
- Benson Cup: (1)
  - 2013
