= Cyril Haran =

Irish Gaelic footballer (1931–2014)

Personal information
- Nicknames: "Cyrilly", "Dosser"
- Born: 7 February 1931
- Died: 25 June 2014 (aged 83) North West Hospice, The Mall, Rathquarter, Sligo
- Occupations: Priest, schoolteacher

Sport
- Sport: Gaelic football
Club management
- Years: Club
- St Mary's; Roscommon Gaels; St Michael's
Inter-county management
- Years: Team
- 1983–1985: Sligo

Cyril Haran (7 February 1931 – 25 June 2014) was a Gaelic footballer and manager, priest, scholar and schoolteacher. He managed the Sligo county team.

== Biography ==
Cyril Haran was born in February 1931. He had three sisters: Grace Liddy (who predeceased him), Margo (based in Sligo at her brother's death) and Sr Vickey Haran (California. He played Gaelic football for Grange as a youth during the 1940s and would go on to become club president.

Fr. Haran spent 58 years as a priest. having been ordained in 1956. His first appointment was as curate in Roscommon and Sooey. He spent most of his priestly life as a teacher, first teaching English at Summerhill College in Sligo (where he was known as "Cyrilly" or "Dosser"), as well as training the school's soccer and Gaelic football teams. He also taught at St Muredach's College in Ballina, County Mayo, and spent time teaching at the University of San Diego in 1968.

In 1988, he was posted to Grange as CC and became parish priest of Ahamlish and Inishmurray in 1997. His retirement came in 2003. He received a celebration Mass and presentation. He spent it at Streedagh until he died from a short illness at the North West Hospice in June 2014 at the age of 83. His funeral was held at Church of Mary Immaculate, Grange, and he was buried afterwards in Sligo Cemetery.

He managed St Mary's to their first Sligo Senior Football Championship title; in 1977, they were the first Sligo club to win a Connacht Senior Club Football Championship title. In 1978, he managed St Mary's to a Sligo Football Championship semi-final against Grange, won by Grange in a replay.

He managed the Sligo county team between 1983 and 1985. Other teams he managed were Roscommon Gaels and St Michael's. He was noted for telling his teams: "Lads, winning isn't everything", then to pause and follow through with "It's the only thing". His enjoyments included literature and fishing.
