= Sligo Intermediate Football Championship =

Annual Gaelic football competition

- Irish: Craobh Idirmeanach Peile; Co. Shligigh
- Trophy: Joe McMorrow Cup
- Title holders: Coolaney/Mullinabreena (3rd title)
- Most titles: Geevagh, Naomh Molaise Gaels & Easkey (6 titles)
- Sponsors: Connacht Gold

Sligo Intermediate Football Championship is an annual second tier Gaelic Athletic Association competition between Gaelic football clubs organised by Sligo GAA. The winning club qualifies to represent its GAA county in the Connacht Intermediate Club Football Championship and, in turn, goes on to the All-Ireland Intermediate Club Football Championship.

== Qualification for subsequent competitions ==
=== Connacht Intermediate Club Football Championship ===
The Sligo IFC winners qualify for the Connacht Intermediate Club Football Championship. It is the only team from County Sligo to qualify for this competition. The Sligo IFC winners enter the Connacht Intermediate Club Football Championship at the quarter-final stage. For example, 2012 winner Bunninadden played in the Connacht IFC final. This was the first since 2004 winner Calry/St Joseph played in the Connacht IFC final.

=== All-Ireland Intermediate Club Football Championship ===
The Sligo IFC winners — by winning the Connacht Intermediate Club Football Championship — may qualify for the All-Ireland Intermediate Club Football Championship, at which they would enter at the semi-final stage, providing they haven't been drawn to face the British champions in the quarter-finals.

== Trophy ==
The trophy presented to the winning team is the Joe McMorrow Cup.

== Roll of honour ==
#	Club	Wins	Years won	Last final lost
1	Easkey	6	1982, 1987, 1990, 2010, 2015, 2023	2022
1	Naomh Molaise Gaels (Formerly Grange/Cliffoney)	6	1981, 1994, 2001, 2008, 2016, 2022	2021
1	Geevagh	6	1984, 1986, 1999, 2006, 2009, 2019	2001
4	Ballymote	3	1993, 1996, 2003	2026
4	Shamrock Gaels	3	1979, 1985, 2018	2014
4	Coolaney/Mullinabreena	3	2005, 2011, 2025	2023
4	Curry	3	1980, 2020, 2026	2018
8	Coolera/Strandhill	2	1989, 1995	n/a
8	Drumcliffe/Rosses Point	2	1992, 2013	2012
8	Calry/St. Joseph's	2	2004, 2014	2013
8	St John's	2	2000, 2017	1995
8	St Farnan's GAA	2	2007, 2021	2017
8	Eastern Harps	2	1983, 2024	2005*
14	Tourlestrane	1	1988	n/a
14	Enniscrone/Kilglass	1	1991	2025
14	Cloonacool	1	1997	n/a
14	Castleconnor	1	1998	2015
14	St. Patrick's, Dromard	1	2002	2006
14	Bunninadden	1	2012	2019

- - Eastern Harps' second team contested the finals of 2003 and 2005.

== List of finals ==
Year	Winner	Score	Opponent	Score
2026	Curry	2-15	Ballymote	0-17
2025	Coolaney/Mullinabreena	1-18	Enniscrone/Kilglass	1-12
2024	Eastern Harps	2-09	Owenmore Gaels	0-04
2023	Easkey	0-12	Coolaney/Mullinabreena	0-09
2022	Naomh Molaise Gaels	2-18	Easkey	0-09
2021	St Farnan's GAA	0-12	Naomh Molaise Gaels	1-08
2020	Curry	1–16	Naomh Molaise Gaels	1–10
2019	Geevagh	2–16	Bunninadden	3-05
2018	Shamrock Gaels	0–17, 1-13 (R)	Curry	2–11, 1-10 (R)
2017	St John's	1-09, 1-14 (R)	St Farnan's	1-09, 0-12 (R)
2016	Naomh Molaise Gaels	0-24	Geevagh	1-04
2015	Easkey	6–10	Castleconnor	2-09
2014	Calry/St. Joseph's	4-09	Shamrock Gaels	0-06
2013	Drumcliffe–Rosses Point	1-09	Calry/St. Joseph's	1-06
2012	Bunninadden	1-07	Drumcliffe–Rosses Point	0-06
2011	Coolaney/Mullinabreena	1–10, 2-15 (AET)(R)	Drumcliffe–Rosses Point	1–10, 1-13 (AET)(R)
2010	Easkey	0–13	Drumcliffe–Rosses Point	1-08
2009	Geevagh	1-08	Bunninadden	1-07
2008	Naomh Molaise Gaels	1-05, 1-11 (AET)(R)	Coolaney/Mullinabreena	0-08, 0-13 (AET)(R)
2007	St Farnan's	2–19	St Michael's	0-07
2006	Geevagh	0–17	St Patrick's, Dromard	1–10
2005	Coolaney/Mullinabreena	2-06, 1-10 (R)	Eastern Harps	0–12, 0-07 (R)
2004	Calry/St. Joseph's	0–12, 2-06 (R)	Coolaney/Mullinabreena	2-06, 1-07 (R)
2003	Ballymote	0–15	Eastern Harps	0-08
2002	St Patrick's, Dromard	1-09	Ballymote	0–11
2001	Grange/Cliffoney	1–12	Geevagh	0-05
2000	St John's	0–12	St Patrick's, Dromard	2-04
1999	Geevagh	0–15, 4-09 (R)	St Michael's	2-09, 2-07 (R)
1998	Castleconnor	2–10	Grange/Cliffoney	0-08
1997	Cloonacool	1–11	St Patrick's, Dromard	1-04
1996	Ballymote	2–12	Coolaney/Mullinabreena	0–11
1995	Coolera/Strandhill	3-08	St John's	2-07
1994	Grange/Cliffoney	3-07	St Farnan's	1-06
1993	Ballymote	0–10	St John's	0-06
1992	Drumcliffe/Rosses Point	0-09	Coolaney/Mullinabreena	0-05
1991	Enniscrone/Kilglass	0–13	Drumcliffe/Rosses Point	2-06
1990	Easkey	0–13	Calry/St. Joseph's	0-07
1989	Coolera/Strandhill	1-09	St Farnan's	0-06
1988	Tourlestrane	0–14	Calry/St. Joseph's	2-03
1987	Easkey	2–10	Owenmore Gaels	0-07
1986	Geevagh	1-09	Enniscrone/Kilglass	0-09
1985	Shamrock Gaels	1-06	Enniscrone/Kilglass	0-04
1984	Geevagh	5–10	Shamrock Gaels	0-04
1983	Eastern Harps	2-07	Bunninadden	0-06
1982	Easkey	3-05	Castleconnor	2-05
1981	Grange	1-07, 2-04 (R)	Castleconnor	1-07, 0-07 (R)
1980	Curry	0–11	Owenmore Gaels	2-02
1979	Shamrock Gaels	3-09	Owenmore Gaels	1-02
