= Ballisodare GAA =

Sligo-based Gaelic games club

Ballisodare
- Baile Easa Dara
- County: Sligo
- Colours: Red and White
- Grounds: Ballisodare

Playing kits
Standard colours

Senior Club Championships
	All Ireland	Connacht champions	Sligo champions
Football:	-	-	6

Ballisodare is a Gaelic Athletic Association club based in the village and hinterland of Ballisodare in County Sligo, Ireland. It had existed successfully for many years before joining with the neighbouring Collooney club, initially as Collooney/Ballisodare and later Owenmore Gaels, before being revived in 1997.

== Honours ==
- Sligo Senior Football Championship:
  - 1931, 1932, 1960, 1961,

(Ballisodare/St Patrick's Dromard 1962, 1963) (Collooney/Ballisodare - 1967, 1969)

- Sligo Junior Football Championship:
  - 1929, 1939, 1956, 2009
- Sligo Senior Football League (Division 1):
  - 1959, 1960, 1961
- Benson Cup:
  - 2000, 2001
