= Mickey Kearins =

Sligo Gaelic footballer

Personal information
- Born: Sligo, Ireland

Sport
- Sport: Gaelic football
- Position: Forward
Club
- Years: Club
- St Patrick's, Dromard
Club titles
- Sligo titles: 7
Inter-county
Years	County	Apps (scores)
1961–1978	Sligo	214 (1266)
Inter-county titles
- Connacht titles: 1
- All Stars: 1

Mickey Kearins (born 18 April 1943) is an Irish former Gaelic footballer who played at senior level for the Sligo county team for 17 years from 1961 until 1978.

In 1971 he was the first Sligo man to win an All-Star. He is also the only Sligo player to win a Cú Chulainn Award-winning it three consecutive years in 1964–66. In 1975 he helped Sligo win the Connacht Senior Football Championship for the first time since 1928.

Kearins played with Connacht in the Railway Cup winning titles in 1967 and 1969. He played his club football with the St Patrick's Dromard club with whom he won seven Sligo Senior Football Championships.

Kearins was top scorer in National Football League history for many decades until May 2021, when David Tubridy took the record from him.

In 2003, Kearins was included in the book Gaelic Football's Top 20. He managed the Sligo under-21 county football team in the early to mid-2000s.

In May 2020, the Irish Independent named Kearins as one of the "dozens of brilliant players" who narrowly missed selection for its "Top 20 footballers in Ireland over the past 50 years".

His brother James also played for Sligo and, later, managed the senior and under-21 teams.
