= St Michael's GAA (Sligo) =

Sligo-based Gaelic games club

St Michael's
- Naomh Michéal
- Founded: 1983
- County: Sligo
- Colours: Green and white
- Grounds: Ballintogher

Playing kits
Standard colours

Geevagh

St Michael's is a Gaelic Athletic Association club based along the Sligo-Leitrim border comprising the Sligo portion of the parish of Killanummery and Ballintogher in County Sligo, Ireland.

Many of there underage teams are amalgamated with the neighbouring club of geevagh due to low numbers

== Honours ==
- Sligo Junior Football Championship: (3)
  - 1992
  - 2016
  - 2019
- Sligo Junior Football League (Division 5): (20
  - 1998, 2006
- Kiernan Cup: (1)
  - 1999

== Notable managers ==
- Cyril Haran
