= St Patrick's GAA (Sligo) =

Sligo-based Gaelic games club

St Patrick's
- Naomh Padraig
- Founded: 1958
- County: Sligo
- Colours: Green and Red
- Grounds: Seamie Donegan Park, Dromard

Playing kits
Standard colours

Senior Club Championships
	All Ireland	Connacht champions	Sligo champions
Football:	-	-	7

St Patrick's is a Gaelic Athletic Association club based in Dromard and Skreen in west County Sligo, Ireland.

Ballaghaderreen midfielder and former championship player for Mayo James Kilcullen declared for Sligo shortly after his club won the 2012 Mayo Senior Football Championship by virtue of St Patrick's being his parents' first club.

The club's most famous player is Mickey Kearins, who made his senior inter-county debut in 1961 and won seven Sligo Senior Football Championship medals with St Pat's.

== Notable players ==
- James Kearins, brother of Mickey Kearins, won a Connacht Senior Football Championship medal as a Sligo player in 1975, was appointed manager in 2003
- Mickey Kearins – All Star: 1971

== Honours ==
- Sligo Senior Football Championship: (7)
  - 1968, 1970, 1971, 1973, 1974, 1988, 1989
- Sligo Intermediate Football Championship: (1)
  - 2002
- Sligo Junior Football Championship: (4)
  - 1964, 1967, 2010, 2021
- Sligo Senior Football League (Division 1): (6)
  - 1970, 1972, 1975, 1976, 1980, 1985
- Sligo Intermediate Football League Division 3 (ex Div. 2): (2)
  - 1993, 2010
- Sligo Junior Football League (Division 5): (1)
  - 2011
- Kiernan Cup: (4)
  - 1981, 1982, 1985, 1991
