= Calry–St Joseph's GAA =

Sligo-based Gaelic games club

Calry–St Joseph's
- Calraigh Naomh Iosef
- Founded: 1972
- County: Sligo
- Colours: Blue and Yellow
- Grounds: Hazelwood
- Coordinates: 54°16′08.62″N 8°25′03.18″W

Playing kits
Standard colours

Senior Club Championships
	All Ireland	Connacht champions	Sligo champions
Hurling:	-	-	7

Calry–St Joseph's is a Gaelic Athletic Association club based in Calry and the northern ward of Sligo, Éire. The club was formerly known as Calry Gaels until it became Calry-St Joseph's in 1987 after a re-organisation of the GAA structures in the Sligo urban area. They have won the last 7 Sligo Senior Hurling Championships and played in 12 of the last 13 finals, winning in 2005 until 2009 and again from 2011 to 2017 (minus 2010). In 2009 they won the Connacht Junior Club Hurling Championship beating Galway side Skehana 1-09 to 0-10 in the final having lost to them the year before and they repeated that feat again in 2012 by beating the same opposition from before, Skehana. They followed up that victory with a double double by winning both Provincial and County Championships in 2013. The club's most recent victory in the Connacht Junior Hurling Championship came in 2016. Reduced to 13 men, with two players sent off, they clawed back a deficit of 5 points to tie the match and go on to beat Micheál Breathnach of the Galway Gaeltacht in extra-time, 3-9 to 2-10. They won the Sligo Intermediate Football Championship in 2004 & 2014 and came Runners Up in 1988, 1990 & 2013 and won Sligo Junior Football Championship in 1976 & 1987 and were Runners Up in 1983 & 1984.

== Notable players ==
- Aidan Devaney
- Finlay O Neil

== Honours ==
- Connacht Junior Club Hurling Championship: (4)
  - 2009, 2012, 2013, 2016
- Sligo Senior Hurling Championship: (11)
  - 2005, 2007, 2008, 2009, 2011, 2012, 2013, 2014, 2015, 2016 2017
- Sligo Intermediate Football Championship: (2)
  - 2004, 2014
- Sligo Junior Football Championship: (2)
  - 1976, 1987
- Sligo Junior B Football Championship: (1)
  - 2010
- Sligo Under 20 Football Championship: (1)
  - 2010
- Sligo Under-14 Football Championship: (2)
  - 1998, 1999
- Sligo Intermediate Football League Division 3 (ex Div. 2): (1)
  - 2005
- Sligo Junior Football League (Division 5): (4)
  - 1975, 1976, 1983, 2009
- Benson Cup: (3)
  - 2005, 2014, 2018
- Sligo Under-16 C Football Championship: (1)
  - 2014
