= 1986 Sligo Senior Football Championship =

Gaelic football competition

Tournament details
- County: Sligo
- Year: 1986

Winners
- Champions: Tubbercurry (18th win)

Promotion/Relegation
- Promoted team(s): Geevagh
- Relegated team(s): Grange

This is a round-up of the 1986 Sligo Senior Football Championship. Tubbercurry finally overcame St. Mary's after three successive final defeats to their great rivals, to win their first title in a decade, and their eighteenth in all.

== First round ==
Game	Date	Venue	Team A	Score	Team B	Score
Sligo SFC; First Round	6 July	Ballymote	Geevagh/St. Michael's	0-6	Owenmore Gaels/Coolera	0-5
Sligo SFC; First Round	6 July	Markievicz Park	Enniscrone/Castleconnor	1-11	Grange	0-5
Sligo SFC; First Round	6 July	Markievicz Park	Tubbercurry	0-8	Easkey/St. Farnan's	1-4
Sligo SFC; First Round	6 July	Tubbercurry	Curry	1-5	Tourlestrane	0-4
Sligo SFC; First Round	6 July	Tubbercurry	St. Nathy's	2-10	Eastern Harps	1-4

== Quarter finals ==
Game	Date	Venue	Team A	Score	Team B	Score
Sligo SFC; Quarter Final	20 July	Markievicz Park	Tubbercurry	2-8	Geevagh/St. Michael's	2-5
Sligo SFC; Quarter Final	20 July	Markievicz Park	Shamrock Gaels	3-8	Enniscrone/Castleconnor	0-9
Sligo SFC; Quarter Final	20 July	Ballymote	St. Mary's	1-10	Curry	0-4
Sligo SFC; Quarter Final	20 July	Ballymote	St. Nathy's	1-12	St. Patrick's	0-9

== Semi-finals ==
Game	Date	Venue	Team A	Score	Team B	Score
Sligo SFC; Semi-Final	3 August	Ballymote	St. Mary's	2-6	St. Nathy's	0-5
Sligo SFC; Semi-Final	3 August	Ballymote	Tubbercurry	2-6	Shamrock Gaels	1-5

== Sligo Senior Football Championship Final ==
Tubbercurry	1-11 - 0-10 (final score after 60 minutes)	St. Mary's
Team: Substitutes:	Half-time: Competition: Sligo Senior Football Championship (Final) Date: 31 August 1986 Venue: Corran Park, Ballymote Referee:	Team: Substitutes:
