= Kent Park =

Gaelic Athletic Association's stadium in Ireland

Tenant
- St Mary's

Kent Park is a GAA stadium in County Sligo in Ireland. It is the home of St Mary's. Kent Park is located in Ballydoogan, west of the coastal seaport of Sligo. It has hosted National Hurling League matches.
