= Eastern Harps GAA =

Sligo-based Gaelic games club

Eastern Harps
- Cláirsigh an Oirthear
- Founded: 1973
- County: Sligo
- Colours: Green and White
- Grounds: Fr Kevin Brehony Park, Keash

Playing kits
Standard colours

Senior Club Championships
	All Ireland	Connacht champions	Sligo champions
Football:	-	-	7

Eastern Harps is a Gaelic Athletic Association club based in east County Sligo, including Keash, Gurteen, Culfadda, Monasteraden and Ballinafad.

== Honours ==
- Sligo Senior Football Championship: (7): 1975, 1993, 1995, 1998, 2002, 2008, 2010
- Sligo Intermediate Football Championship: (1): 1983
- Sligo Under 20 Football Championship: (3): 1994, 1998, 2001
- Sligo Minor Football Championship: (3): 1993, 2000, 2004, 2017
- Sligo Senior Football League (Division 1) (7): 1990, 1995, 1997, 2002, 2003, 2005, 2008
- Sligo Intermediate Football League Division 3 (ex Div. 2) (2): 1983, 2003
- Kiernan Cup (3): 1990, 1994, 1995
- Benson Cup (2): 2007, 2009

== Notable players ==
- Paul Taylor
