= Shamrock Gaels GAA =

Sligo-based Gaelic games club

Shamrock Gaels
- Gaeil na Seamróige
- Founded: 1972
- County: Sligo
- Colours: Maroon and White
- Grounds: Shamrock Gaels Park, Coola

Playing kits
Standard colours

Senior Club Championships
	All Ireland	Connacht champions	Sligo champions
Football:	-	-	3

Shamrock Gaels is a Gaelic Athletic Association club based in the east of County Sligo, Ireland, including the parishes of Riverstown, Sooey, Gleann and Castlebaldwin. It was formed in March 1972 when two clubs, Sooey and Knockalassa, amalgamated.

As of 2022, it was a Sligo Senior Football Championship club. They celebrated their fiftieth birthday that year, with RTÉ TV's Pat Spillane a guest of theirs.

== Notable players ==
- Frank Henry, won a Connacht Senior Football Championship with Sligo in 1975
- Evan Lyons
- Noel Mullaney

== Honours ==
- Sligo Senior Football Championship: (3)
  - 1990, 1992, 2025
- Sligo Intermediate Football Championship: (2)
  - 1979, 1985, 2018
- Sligo Junior A Football Championship: (1)
  - 2022
- Sligo Junior B Football Championship: (1)
  - 1999
- Sligo Under 20 Football Championship: (4)
  - 1975, 1987, 1988, 1989
- Sligo Minor Football Championship: (2)
  - 1972, 1973
- Sligo Under-14 Football Championship: (4)
  - 1977, 1981, 1983, 1984
- Sligo Senior Football League (Division 1): (1)
  - 1986
- Sligo Intermediate Football League Division 3 (ex Div. 2): (3)
  - 1979, 1985, 2000
- Sligo Junior Football League (Division 5): (2)
  - 1989, 2004
- Kiernan Cup: (3)
  - 1986, 2000, 2009
