= St Mary's GAA (Sligo) =

Sligo-based Gaelic games club

St Mary's
- Naomh Mhuire
- Founded: 1976
- County: Sligo
- Nickname: Mary's
- Colours: Red and black
- Grounds: Kent Park, Ballydoogan
- Coordinates: 54.265014°N 8.500840°W

Playing kits
Standard colours

Senior Club Championships
	All Ireland	Connacht champions	Sligo champions
Football:	-	3	12

St Mary's is a Gaelic Athletic Association club based in the western ward of Sligo, County Sligo, Ireland.

== History ==
The club was formed in 1976 from the amalgamation of the Craobh Rua and Muire Naofa clubs. It was the first Sligo club to win the Connacht Senior Club Football Championship, winning three titles. As well as that, they are the only team to have won the county minor, U-21 and senior championship in Sligo in the same season, having done so in 1985 and 2015. They have also won eleven senior county titles.

== Notable players ==
- Tommy Breheny – led Sligo as manager to a rare Connacht Senior Football Championship in 2007
- Mark Breheny – younger brother of Tommy, was one of Sligo's main players at that time
- Peter Ford
- Emlyn Mulligan
- Barnes Murphy – All Star: 1974

== Notable managers ==
- Cyril Haran

== Honours ==
- Connacht Senior Club Football Championship: (3)
  - 1977, 1980, 1983
- All-Ireland Football Sevens Championship: (1)
  - 1980
- Sligo Senior Football Championship(12)
- 1977, 1979, 1980, 1981, 1983, 1984, 1985, 1987, 1996, 2001, 2015 2026
- Sligo Junior Football Championship: (4)
  - 1993, 1996, 2000, 2014
- Sligo Junior B Football Championship: (2)
  - 1998 2019
- Sligo Under 20 Football Championship: (8)
  - 1985, 1986, 2000, 2012, 2013, 2015, 2016, 2018
- Sligo Minor Football Championship: (11)
  - 1983, 1984, 1985, 1986, 1987, 1997, 2011, 2012, 2013, 2014, 2015,2022
- Sligo Under-16 Football Championship: (15)
  - 1978, 1980, 1982, 1983, 1984, 1985, 1987, 1995, 1997, 2004, 2010, 2011, 2012, 2013, 2015
- Sligo Under-14 Football Championship: (7)
  - 1976, 1978, 1979, 1988, 2002, 2008, 2011
- Sligo Senior Football League (Division 1): (7)
  - 1977, 1978, 1979, 1982, 1983, 1988, 2014
- Sligo Senior Football League (Division 2): (1)
  - 2010
- Sligo Senior Football League (Division 3): (1)
  - 2014
- Sligo Intermediate Football League (Division 4): (2)
  - 2013, 2019
- Sligo Junior Football League (Division 5): (2)
  - 1987, 1996
- Kiernan Cup: (5)
  - 1980, 1983, 1987, 2008, 2010
