= Naomh Molaise Gaels GAA =

Sligo-based Gaelic games club

Naomh Molaise Gaels
- Gaeil Naomh Molaise
- County: Sligo
- Colours: Green and White
- Grounds: Monsignor Hynes Park, Grange

Playing kits
Standard colours

Naomh Molaise Gaels is a Gaelic Athletic Association club covering much of the northern area of County Sligo, comprising Cliffoney (Ahamlish) and part of the Drumcliffe/Maugherow parishes. The club is a combination of a number of older clubs, including Grange, Cliffoney and Maugherow, and had fielded as Grange–Cliffoney before adopting the present name in 2003. Currently the champions of the Dr Taheny Cup for the minor A championship, a first-time achievement for the club.

Cyril Haran played for the club when it was known as Grange and was later a coach and club president.

== Notable players ==
- Cyril Haran (as Grange)
- Mattie Hoey, former Sligo captain who won a Connacht Senior Football Championship in 1975, played for Connacht in the Railway Cup and listed as number 12 in a 2020 Irish Independent list of top players over the previous 50 years (ahead of Dessie Sloyan)

Haran (president) and Hoey (chairman) were both still involved with the club, as of 2011.

== Honours ==
N.B. Honours prior to 2003 won as Grange unless otherwise stated.

- Sligo Intermediate Football Championship: (5)
  - 1981, 1994, 2001, 2008, 2016, 2022
- Sligo Junior Football Championship: (8)
  - 1959, 1969, 1975, 2001 (Maugherow - 1933, 1941, 1991, Northern Gaels - 1982)
- Sligo Under 20 Football Championship: (1)
  - 1977
- Sligo Minor A Football Championship: (2)
  - 2018, 2020
- Sligo Minor Football Championship: (1)
  - (Cliffoney - 1945)
- Sligo Under-16 Football Championship: (2)
  - 2006, 2017
- Sligo Under 14 Football Championship: (1)
  - 2017
- Sligo Senior Football League (Division 1): (1)
  - 2011
- Sligo Intermediate Football League Division 3 (ex Div. 2): (3)
  - 1987, 2001, 2008
- Sligo Intermediate Football League (Division 4): (1)
  - 2008
- Sligo Junior Football League (Division 5) (4)
  - 1973, 1974, 2000, 2007
- Kiernan Cup: (3)
  - 1984, 1997, 1998
- Benson Cup: (2)
  - 1987, 1994
