= Easkey GAA =

Sligo-based Gaelic games club

Easkey
- Iascaigh
- Founded: 1888
- County: Sligo
- Nickname: The Sea Blues
- Colours
- Grounds: Castletown Grounds
- Coordinates: 54°17′24″N 8°58′44″W

Playing kits
Standard colours

Senior Club Championships
	All Ireland	Connacht champions	Sligo champions
Football:	0	0	5
Hurling:	0	0	8

Easkey GAA is a Gaelic Athletic Association club in Easkey, County Sligo, Ireland, The club is affiliated to the Sligo County Board and fields teams in both hurling and Gaelic football.

== History ==
Easkey GAA is located in the village of Easkey and includes the hinterlands of Rathlee, Killeenduff and Owenbeg. An informal meeting took place on 15 January 1888 in the village of Easkey to initiate a parish branch of the newly founded GAA. This was followed by a second meeting, two weeks later, that formally constituted the club, with thirty men enrolling as members. Immediately after this formation meeting, the group played a football match to mark the occasion. The newly formed club was one of the first to participate in the inaugural Sligo Senior Football Championship in 1888.

Easkey's first major successes came when the club won three consecutive Sligo SFC titles between 1935 and 1937, with further senior success in 1941 and 1966. Easkey are also joint top with number of most Sligo IFC titles.

In terms of hurling, Easkey won consecutive Sligo SHC titles in 1962 and 1963. Hurling declined in the club in the decades that followed, however, an adult team was reinstated after a 35-year lapse in 2018. Between 2020 and 2025, Easkey won six consecutive Sligo SHC titles. The club has also won four consecutive Connacht Club JHC titles during this time. The club reached the 2023 All-Ireland Club JHC final, but were beaten Ballgiblin, and again reached the 2025–26 All-Ireland Junior Club Hurling Championship final but were beaten by Kilbrittain GAA.

== Honours ==
- Sligo Senior Football Championship (5): 1935, 1936, 1937, 1941, 1966
- Sligo Senior Hurling Championship (8): 1962, 1963, 2020, 2021, 2022, 2023, 2024, 2025
- Sligo Intermediate Football Championship (6): 1982, 1987, 1990, 2010, 2015, 2023
- Connacht Junior Club Hurling Championship (4): 2022, 2023, 2024, 2025
- Connacht Junior Club Football Championship (1): 2018
- Sligo Junior Football Championship (5): 1907, 1960, 1965, 1977, 2018
- Sligo Junior B Football Championship (1): 2000
- Sligo Under-20 Football Championship (3): 1995, 1997 (amalgamated with St. Farnan's), 2019 (amalgamated with Enniscrone)
- Sligo Minor Football Championship (3): 1931, 1980, 2016 (amalgamated with Enniscrone in 2016)
- Sligo Minor Hurling Championship (6): 2015, 2016, 2017, 2018, 2019, 2020
- Sligo Senior Football League (Division 1) (7): 1947, 1951, 1952, 1967, 1969, 1994, 1998
- Sligo Intermediate Football League Division 3 (ex Div. 2) (1): 1981

== Notable players ==
- Andrew Kilcullen
- Dessie Sloyan
