= Tourlestrane GAA =

Sligo-based Gaelic games club

Tourlestrane
- Tuair Liostreain
- Founded: 1938
- County: Sligo
- Colours: Green and Gold
- Grounds: Tourlestrane

Playing kits
Standard colours

Senior Club Championships
	All Ireland	Connacht champions	Sligo champions
Football:	-	-	18
Hurling:	-	-	7

Tourlestrane is a Gaelic Athletic Association club based along the Sligo-Mayo border in south County Sligo, comprising the parish of the same name.

Among the club's former managers are Fergal O'Donnell of Roscommon and Mike Solan (Mayo's 2016 All-Ireland Under-21 Football Championship-winning manager), who briefly replaced O'Donnell, until he took over as Longford senior manager.

== Notable players ==
- Gerry McGowan – Connacht Senior Football Championship winner: 2007
- Eamonn O'Hara – Connacht Senior Football Championship winner: 2007, All Star: 2002
- Brendan Egan - Connacht Senior Football Championship winner: 2007
- David Durkin

== Honours ==
- Sligo Senior Football Championship: (18)
  - 1956, 1978, 1982, 1994, 1997, 1999, 2004, 2007, 2009, 2011, 2013, 2016, 2017, 2018, 2019, 2020, 2021, 2022
- Sligo Senior Hurling Championship: (7)
  - 1981, 1983, 1985, 1986, 1988, 1990, 1991
- Sligo Intermediate Football Championship: (1)
  - 1988
- Sligo Junior Football Championship: (5)
  - 1946, 1954, 1986, 2004, 2015, 2020
- Sligo Under 20 Football Championship: (3)
  - 1976, 2006, 2008
- Sligo Minor Football Championship: (5)
  - 1967, 1968, 1971, 1981, 1982
- Sligo Under-16 Football Championship: (3)
  - 1971, 1975, 1977
- Sligo Senior Football League (Division 1): (16)
  - 1971, 1973, 1984, 1992, 2000, 2001, 2009, 2010, 2012, 2013, 2015, 2016, 2017, 2018, 2019, 2021
- Sligo Intermediate Football League (Division 4): (1)
  - 2009
- Sligo Junior Football League (Division 5): (1)
  - 1980
- Kiernan Cup: (3)
  - 1989, 1996, 2011
- Benson Cup: (2)
  - 1988, 2010
