= Coolera–Strandhill GAA =

Sligo-based Gaelic games club

Coolera–Strandhill
- Cuil Iorra–Leathrós
- Founded: 1886
- County: Sligo
- Colours: Red and White
- Grounds: Ransboro Park
- Coordinates: 54°14′41″N 8°32′33″W

Playing kits
Standard colours

Senior Club Championships
	All Ireland	Connacht champions	Sligo champions
Football:	-	1	4
Hurling:	-	-	1

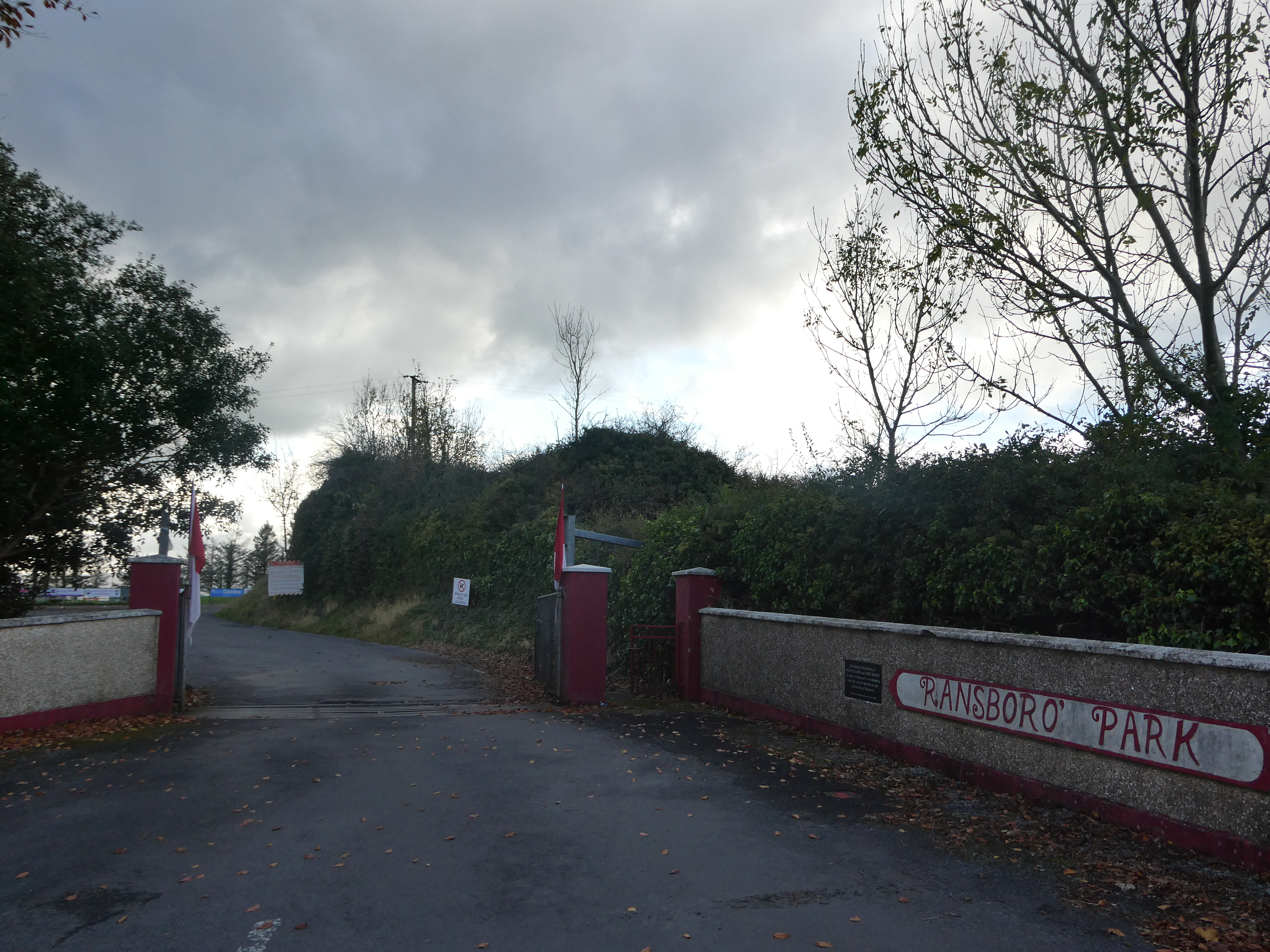
Entrance to Ransboro Park

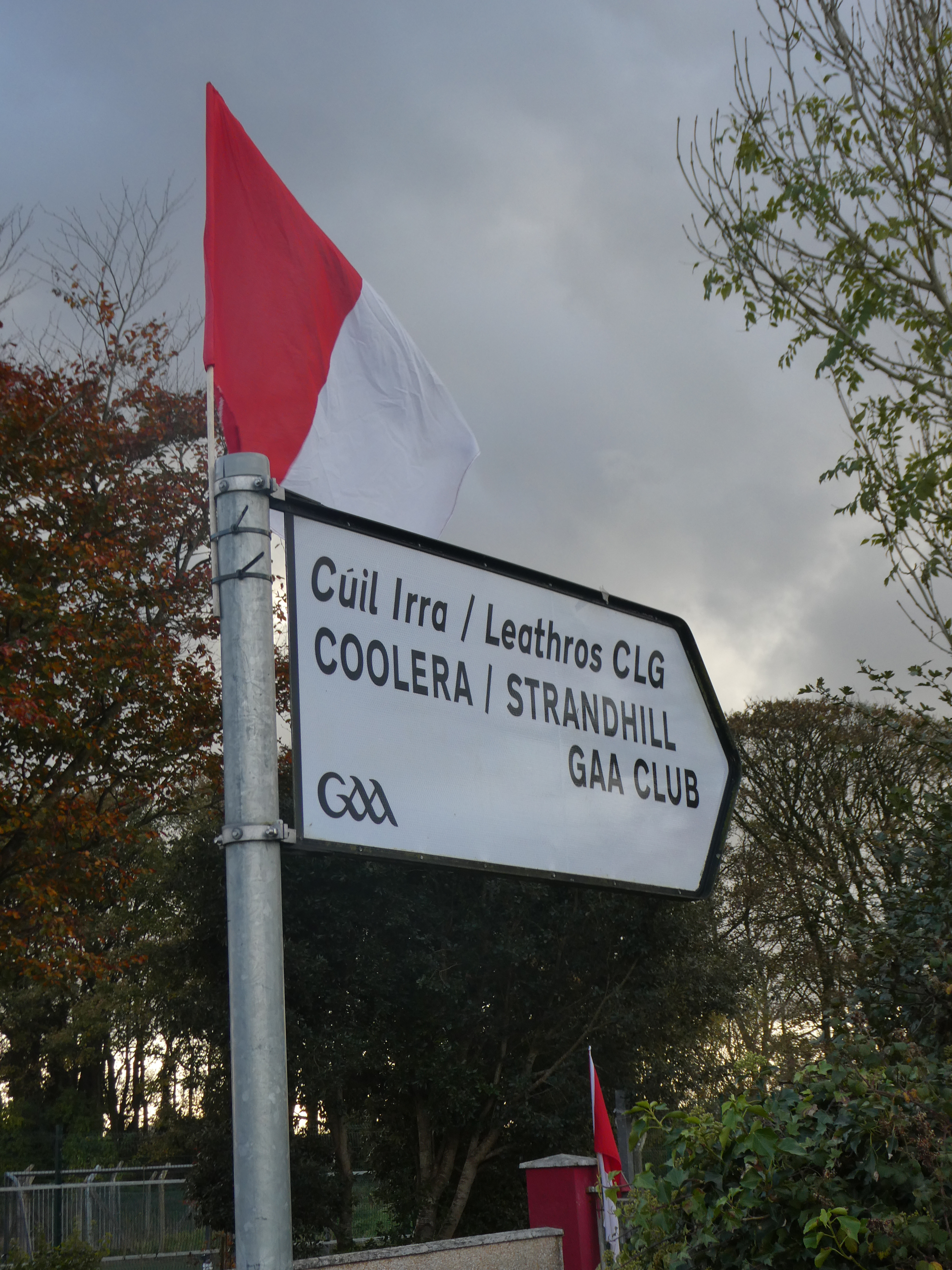
Sign pointing to Coolera/Strandhill GAA

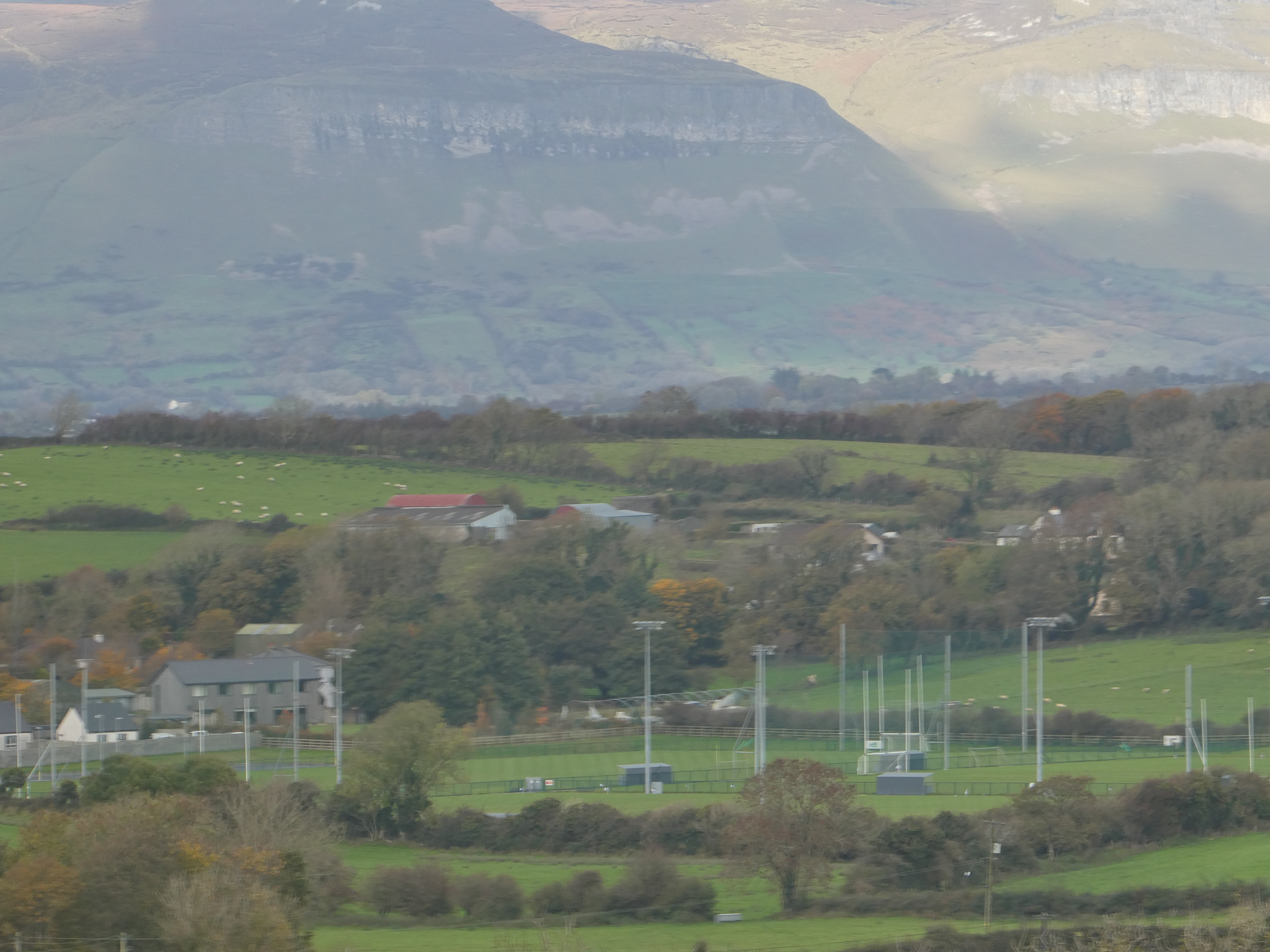
View of Ransboro Park

Coolera–Strandhill is a Gaelic Athletic Association club based in the Coolera Peninsula, comprising the parish of Strandhill and Ransboro in County Sligo, Ireland.

The club often contests Sligo Senior Football Championship finals.

Coolera Strandhill are Connacht Senior Football Champions 2024.

== Honours ==
- Connacht Senior Football Championship (1): 2024
- Sligo Senior Football Championship (4): 1907, 2005, 2023, 2024
- Sligo Senior Hurling Championship (1): 2018
- Sligo Intermediate Football Championship (2): 1989, 1995
- Sligo Junior Football Championship (4): 1916, 1949, 1971, 2007
- Sligo Under 20 Football Championship (2): 2002, 2009
- Sligo Minor Football Championship (3): 1932, 1939, 1964
- Sligo Senior Football League (Division 1) (5): 1939, 1942, 1946, 1953, 2022
- Sligo Senior Football League (Division 2) (3): 2005, 2007, 2012
- Sligo Intermediate Football League Division 3 (ex Div. 2) (2): 1989, 1995
- Sligo Junior Football League (Division 5) (2): 1971, 1990
- Kiernan Cup (3): 1992, 2005, 2013
