= Drumcliffe–Rosses Point GAA =

Sligo-based Gaelic games club

Drumcliffe–Rosses Point
- Droim Cliabh/Ros Ceite
- County: Sligo
- Colours: Red and Black
- Grounds: Oxfield

Playing kits
Standard colours

Drumcliffe–Rosses Point is a Gaelic Athletic Association club based in north County Sligo, Ireland, including the villages of Drumcliffe, Rosses Point, Rathcormac and Carney.

== Notable players ==
- Paul Durcan – All Star goalkeeper who won the All-Ireland Senior Football Championship with Donegal and the All-Ireland Senior Club Football Championship with Ballyboden
- Neil Ewing – captained the Sligo senior team

== Honours ==
- Sligo Intermediate Football Championship: (2)
  - 1992, 2013
- Sligo Junior Football Championship: (4)
  - 1934, 1958, 1990, 2006
- Sligo Senior Football League (Division 2): (1)
  - 2016
- Sligo Under 20 Football Championship: (1)
  - 1991
- Sligo Minor Football Championship: (4)
  - 1988, 1989, 1990, 1992
- Sligo Intermediate Football League Division 3 (ex Div. 2): (2)
  - 1991, 2009
- Benson Cup: (2)
  - 1990, 2006
