= Cloonacool GAA =

Sligo-based Gaelic games club

Cloonacool
- Cluain na Cúile
- County: Sligo
- Colours: Blue and Yellow
- Grounds: Cloonacool

Playing kits
Standard colours

Cloonacool is a Gaelic Athletic Association club based in south County Sligo, Ireland.

The club marked its centenary in 2016, including by publishing a book with research extracted from newspapers and national archives.

== Honours ==
- Sligo Intermediate Football Championship (1): 1997
- Sligo Intermediate Football League Division 3 (ex Div. 2) (2): 1999, 2011
