= Curry GAA =

Sligo-based Gaelic games club

Curry
- Curraigh
- Founded: 1886
- County: Sligo
- Colours: Green and White
- Grounds: Curry

Playing kits
Standard colours

Senior Club Championships
	All Ireland	Connacht champions	Sligo champions
Football:	-	-	7

Curry-Moylough is a Gaelic Athletic Association club based along the Sligo-Mayo border comprising the parish of Curry and Moylough in County Sligo, Ireland.

The placename in Irish is "An Choraidh" which translates as "the weir, stone-fence or ford".

== Notable players ==
- Red Óg Murphy

== Honours ==
- Sligo Senior Football Championship: (7)
  - 1889, 1922, 1964, 1972, 2003, 2006, 2012
- Sligo Intermediate Football Championship: (3)
  - 1980, 2020, 2026
- Sligo Junior Football Championship: (2)
  - 1955, 2011
- Sligo Junior B Football Championship: (3)
  - 1997, 2001, 2021
- Sligo Under 20 Football Championship: (4)
  - 1996, 2004, 2005, 2021
- Sligo Minor Football Championship: (9)
  - 1930, 1991, 1995, 1996, 2001, 2007, 2008, 2009, 2012
- Sligo Senior Football League (Division 1): (7)
  - 1956, 1962, 1981, 1989, 1996, 2006, 2007
- Sligo Intermediate Football League Division 3 (ex Div. 2): (1)
  - 1980
- Sligo Intermediate Football League (Division 4): (3)
  - 2007, 2011, 2017
- Kiernan Cup: (1)
  - 1993
