= Ballymote GAA =

Sligo-based Gaelic games club

Ballymote
- Baile an Mhóta
- Founded: 1886
- County: Sligo
- Nickname: Round Towers
- Colours: Red and White
- Grounds: Corran Park, Ballymote

Playing kits
Standard colours

Senior Club Championships
	All Ireland	Connacht champions	Sligo champions
Football:	-	-	5

Ballymote is a Gaelic Athletic Association club based in the town and parish of Ballymote in County Sligo, Ireland

James Kearins led Ballymote to the 1996 Sligo Intermediate Football Championship title before being appointed manager of the Sligo county team in 2003.

== Honours ==
- Sligo Senior Football Championship:
  - 1892, 1905, 1913, 1925, 1948
- Sligo Intermediate Football Championship:
  - 1993, 1996, 2003
- Sligo Junior Football Championship:
  - (Derroon - 1935, 1945), 2017, 2024
- Sligo Under 20 Football Championship:
  - 2003, 2006
- Sligo Minor Football Championship:
  - 1949, 1960, 2003
- Sligo Under-16 Football Championship:
  - 2001
- Sligo Junior Football League (Division 5):
  - 2003, 2008
- Kiernan Cup:
  - 2003, 2004
- Benson Cup:
  - 1992
- Abbott Cup:
  - 2010, 2018
