= Geevagh GAA =

Sligo-based Gaelic games club

Geevagh
- Ghaobhach
- County: Sligo
- Colours: Blue and White
- Grounds: Geevagh

Playing kits
Standard colours

Geevagh is a Gaelic Athletic Association club based in the parish of Geevagh, in the south east of County Sligo, Ireland.

== History ==
Geevagh was founded in 1886.

== Notable players ==
- Pat Hughes

== Honours ==
- Sligo Intermediate Football Championship: (5)
  - 1984, 1986, 1999, 2006, 2009
- Sligo Junior Football Championship: (4)
  - 1936, 1974, 1981, 1998
- Sligo Junior B Football Championship: (1)
  - 2011
- Sligo Minor Football Championship: (1)
  - 1979
- Sligo Senior Football League (Division 2): (1)
  - 2008
- Sligo Intermediate Football League Division 3 (ex Div. 2): (2)
  - 1984, 2007
- Sligo Junior Football League (Division 5): (1)
  - 1981
- Kiernan Cup: (1)
  - 2001
- Benson Cup: (1)
  - 1998
