= 1982 Sligo Senior Football Championship =

Gaelic football competition

Tournament details
- County: Sligo
- Year: 1982

Winners
- Champions: Tourlestrane (3rd win)
- Captain: Michael Henry

Promotion/Relegation
- Promoted team(s): Easkey
- Relegated team(s): Shamrock Gaels

This is a round-up of the 1982 Sligo Senior Football Championship. Tourlestrane were crowned champions in this year, after defeating St. Patrick's in what was regarded as a hugely entertaining final. Tourlestrane had scuppered St. Mary's hopes of a fourth successive title at the semi-final stage.

== Quarter finals ==
Game	Date	Venue	Team A	Score	Team B	Score
Sligo SFC; Quarter Final	8 August	Ballymote	Tourlestrane	0-8	Shamrock Gaels	1-5
Sligo SFC; Quarter Final	8 August	Markievicz Park	St. Patrick’s	0-11	Coolera	0-6
Sligo SFC; Quarter Final	8 August	Tubbercurry	Tubbercurry	2-6	Curry	0-9
Sligo SFC; Quarter Final	8 August	Markievicz Park	St. Mary’s	1-9	Grange	2-5
Sligo SFC; Quarter Final Replay	22 August	Ballymote	Tourlestrane	2-9	Shamrock Gaels	0-7

== Semi-finals ==
Game	Date	Venue	Team A	Score	Team B	Score
Sligo SFC; Semi-Final	29 August	Ballymote	Tourlestrane	1-10	St. Mary’s	0-7
Sligo SFC; Semi-Final	29 August	Markievicz Park	St. Patrick’s	0-8	Tubbercurry	0-3

== Sligo Senior Football Championship Final ==
Tourlestrane	2-9 - 2-6 (final score after 60 minutes)	St. Patrick's
Team: M. Marren; J. Lundy; S. Henry; J. Quinn; J. Walsh; M. Brennan; M. Henry (Capt); A. Brennan; P. Henry; P.J. Gallagher; S. Durkin; B. Leonard; M. Curran; T. Carty; M. Durkin Substitutes:	Half-time: Competition: Sligo Senior Football Championship (Final) Date: 12 September 1982 Venue: Kilcoyne Park, Tubbercurry Referee:	Team: S. Clarke; P. Kilgallon; D. Foley; J. Kiely; J. Connolly; J. Kilgallon; L. Boland; J. Kearins; G. Boland; P. Brady; T. Mahon; S. Reilly; P. Kearins; M. Kearins; C. Kearins Substitutes: J. Clarke; N. Kearins
