= 1970 Sligo Senior Football Championship =

Gaelic football competition

Sligo Senior Football Championship 1970
Tournament details
- County: Sligo
- Year: 1970

Winners
- Champions: St. Patrick's, Dromard (2nd win)

Promotion/Relegation
- Promoted team(s): n/a
- Relegated team(s): n/a

This is a round-up of the 1970 Sligo Senior Football Championship. St. Patrick's, Dromard claimed their second title, as they embarked on their dominance of Sligo football in the early seventies. Mullinabreena were the beaten finalists, making their last appearance in a Senior final.

== First round ==
Game	Date	Venue	Team A	Score	Team B	Score
Sligo SFC; First Round	2 August	Ballymote	Tourlestrane	2-9	Sooey/Knockalassa	1-7
Sligo SFC; First Round	2 August	Ballymote	Mullinabreena	1-6	Muire Naofa	0-5
Sligo SFC; First Round	2 August	Markievicz Park	Grange	2-11	Keash/Ballymote	3-3
Sligo SFC; First Round	2 August	Enniscrone	Easkey	3-7	Tubbercurry	1-6
Sligo SFC; First Round	2 August	Tubbercurry	Curry	2-9	Coolera/St. Columba's	1-2
Sligo SFC; First Round	23 August	Ballymote	Collooney/Ballisodare	4-4	Craobh Rua	0-4

== Quarter-finals ==
Game	Date	Venue	Team A	Score	Team B	Score
Sligo SFC; Quarter-final	23 August	Tubbercurry	Easkey	3-7	Tourlestrane	1-6
Sligo SFC; Quarter-final	30 August	Tubbercurry	St. Patrick's	beat	Curry	(no score)
Sligo SFC; Quarter-final	30 August	Easkey	Enniscrone	beat	Collooney/Ballisodare	(no score)
Sligo SFC; Quarter-final	30 August	Ballymote	Mullinabreena	3-7	Grange	2-2

== Semi-finals ==
Game	Date	Venue	Team A	Score	Team B	Score
Sligo SFC; Semi-final	13 September	Tubbercurry	Mullinabreena	5-5	Enniscrone	3-8
Sligo SFC; Semi-final	13 September	Tubbercurry	St. Patrick's	4-9	Easkey	1-6

== Sligo Senior Football Championship Final ==
St. Patrick's	1-13 - 1-5 (final score after 60 minutes)	Mullinabreena
Team: T. Cummins; E. Rushe; A. Boland; P.J. Kilcullen; S. Donegan; J. Cuffe; J. Kiely; J. Kilgallon; M. Kearins; P. McMunn; R. Boland; P. Kearins; P.J. Clarke; S. Beckett; B. Kilcullen Substitutes:	Half-time: Competition: Sligo Senior Football Championship (Final) Date: 20 September 1970 Venue: Kilcoyne Park, Tubbercurry Referee: P.J. Brennan (Tubbercurry)	Team: S. Sweeney; T. McNulty; S. Roddy; W. Rooney; P. Gallagher; P. Gorman; T. Roddy; J. Finan; J. Brennan; F. Gallagher; R. Lipsett; T. Kilcoyne; S. McCarrick; F. McCarrick; P. Kilcoyne Substitutes:
