= 1963 Sligo Senior Football Championship =

Gaelic football competition

Sligo Senior Football Championship 1963
Tournament details
- County: Sligo
- Year: 1963

Winners
- Champions: Ballisodare/St. Patrick's (6th win)

Promotion/Relegation
- Promoted team(s): n/a
- Relegated team(s): n/a

This is a round-up of the 1963 Sligo Senior Football Championship. Ballisodare, having linked up with neighbours St. Patrick's, claimed a fourth successive title in 1963, following a replay win over Craobh Rua in the final.

== First round ==
Game	Date	Venue	Team A	Score	Team B	Score
Sligo SFC; First Round	4 August	Collooney	Easkey	beat	Keash/Knockalassa	(no score)
Sligo SFC; First Round	11 August	Ballymote	Curry	beat	Tubbercurry	(no score)
Sligo SFC; First Round	11 August	Collooney	Tourlestrane	beat	Grange	(no score)

== Quarter-finals ==
Game	Date	Venue	Team A	Score	Team B	Score
Sligo SFC; Quarter-final	11 August	Collooney	Craobh Rua	beat	Ballymote	(no score)
Sligo SFC; Quarter-final	11 August	Markievicz Park	Ballisodare/St. Patrick's	1–6	Sooey	1–6
Sligo SFC; Quarter-final	18 August	Tubbercurry	Tourlestrane	3–6	Curry	1–6
Sligo SFC; Quarter-final	18 August	Markievicz Park	Collooney Harps	beat	Easkey	(no score)
Sligo SFC; Quarter-final Replay	18 August	Markievicz Park	Ballisodare/St. Patrick's	beat	Sooey	(no score)

== Semi-finals ==
Game	Date	Venue	Team A	Score	Team B	Score
Sligo SFC; Semi-final	1 September	Markievicz Park	Ballisodare/St. Patrick's	2–6	Collooney Harps	1–6
Sligo SFC; Semi-final	1 September	Tubbercurry	Craobh Rua	2–6	Tourlestrane	0–7

== Sligo Senior Football Championship Final ==
Ballisodare/St. Patrick's	1-8 - 2-5 (final score after 60 minutes)	Craobh Rua
Team: P. Fallon; P. Fallon; P. Fallon; P. Fallon; P. Fallon; P. Fallon; P. Fallon; P. Forpadraig; P. Fallon; P. Fallon; P. Fallon; P. Fallon; P. Fallon; P. Fallon; P. Fallon Substitutes:	Half-time: Competition: Sligo Senior Football Championship (Final) Date: 8 September 1963 Venue: Markievicz Park, Sligo Referee:	Team: Substitutes:

=== Sligo Senior Football Championship Final Replay ===
Ballisodare/St. Patrick's	2-10 - 1-5 (final score after 60 minutes)	Craobh Rua
Team: A. O'Brien; B. McGovern; B. McDermott; J. Murphy; P.J. Lenehan; T. Hayden; J. Lee; K. Lamb; G. Hatton; F. Murphy; G. Chatten; J. Bowe; A. Lang; G. Burke; J. Moss Substitutes:	Half-time: Competition: Sligo Senior Football Championship (Final) Date: 22 September 1963 Venue: Markievicz Park, Sligo Referee:	Team: Substitutes:
