= 1965 Sligo Senior Football Championship =

Gaelic football competition

Sligo Senior Football Championship 1965
Tournament details
- County: Sligo
- Year: 1965

Winners
- Champions: Collooney Harps (3rd win)

Promotion/Relegation
- Promoted team(s): n/a
- Relegated team(s): n/a

This is a round-up of the 1965 Sligo Senior Football Championship. Collooney Harps built on the promise shown in previous years to claim their third title and first since 1943, defeating St. Patrick's, now operating independently of Ballisodare, in the final.

== Quarter-finals ==
Game	Date	Venue	Team A	Score	Team B	Score
Sligo SFC; Quarter-final	8 August	Ballymote	Collooney Harps	beat	Tubbercurry	(no score)
Sligo SFC; Quarter-final	8 August	Ballymote	Ballymote	beat	Craobh Rua	(no score)
Sligo SFC; Quarter-final	8 August	Tubbercurry	Curry	beat	Tourlestrane	(no score)
Sligo SFC; Quarter-final	8 August	Tubbercurry	St. Patrick’s	beat	Bunninadden	(no score)

== Semi-finals ==
Game	Date	Venue	Team A	Score	Team B	Score
Sligo SFC; Semi-final	29 August	Markievicz Park	St. Patrick’s	1-11	Ballymote	2-6
Sligo SFC; Semi-final	29 August	Markievicz Park	Collooney Harps	4-4	Curry	3-6

== Sligo Senior Football Championship Final ==
Collooney Harps	2-6 - 1-7 (final score after 60 minutes)	St. Patrick's
Team: P. Conroy; M. Flynn; B. Weir; T. Toolan; J. Sherlock; T. Gray; P. O'Connell; B. McAuley; B. Shannon; O. Lynch; A. Flynn; P. Walsh; D. Martin; T. Weir; P. Watters Substitutes:	Half-time: Competition: Sligo Senior Football Championship (Final) Date: 12 September 1965 Venue: Markievicz Park, Sligo Referee:	Team: M. Kerrigan; A. Boland; F. Leonard; E. Carney; S. Donegan; J. Cuffe; P. Conlon; S. Beckett; M. Kearins; K. Corcoran; M. Cummins; P. McMunn; P. Cummins; J. Leonard; V. McHugh Substitutes: E. Rushe
