= 1999 Sligo Senior Football Championship =

Gaelic football competition

Tournament details
- County: Sligo
- Year: 1999

Winners
- Champions: Tourlestrane (6th win)
- Manager: Neil Egan
- Captain: Eamonn O'Hara

Promotion/Relegation
- Promoted team(s): Geevagh, Cloonacool
- Relegated team(s): Shamrock Gaels, Grange/Cliffoney

This is a round-up of the 1999 Sligo Senior Football Championship. Tourlestrane regained the Owen B. Hunt Cup in this year after defeating Easkey, making their first final appearance since 1968. The group stages were re-introduced for this year, but with only three groups used, this resulted in a complicated series of playoffs to determine the final semi-final spot. Tubbercurry, having been disqualified after failing to field against Shamrock Gaels in a playoff, but then re-instated, won that last spot, but Tourlestrane then ended their ambitions in the semi-final.

== Group stages ==
The Championship was contested by 12 teams, divided into three groups of four. The top side in each group qualified for the semi-finals, with the runners-up playing off to decide the other semi-finalist.

=== Group A ===
Date	Venue	Team A	Score	Team B	Score
25 July	Coola	Eastern Harps	3-10	Bunninadden	0-4
25 July	Markievicz Park	Curry	2-7	Drumcliffe/Rosses Point	2-6
31 July	Tubbercurry	Curry	2-15	Bunninadden	0-9
1 August	Kent Park	Drumcliffe/Rosses Point	0-13	Eastern Harps	0-6
8 August	Tubbercurry	Eastern Harps	3-4	Curry	1-7
8 August	Markievicz Park	Bunninadden	1-7	Drumcliffe/Rosses Point	0-10

Team	Pld	W	D	L	For	Against	Pts
Eastern Harps	3	2	0	1	6-20	1-24	4
Curry	3	2	0	1	5-29	5-19	4
Drumcliffe/Rosses Point	3	1	1	1	2-29	3-20	3
Bunninadden	3	0	1	2	1-20	5-35	1

=== Group B ===
Date	Venue	Team A	Score	Team B	Score
25 July	Kent Park	Castleconnor	0-16	Grange/Cliffoney	1-6
25 July	Enniscrone	Tubbercurry	1-9	Easkey	0-8
1 August	Markievicz Park	Tubbercurry	3-9	Grange/Cliffoney	1-8
1 August	Enniscrone	Easkey	1-14	Castleconnor	0-7
7 August	Markievicz Park	Easkey	0-18	Grange/Cliffoney	0-8
7 August	Tourlestrane	Castleconnor	0-14	Tubbercurry	1-9

Team	Pld	W	D	L	For	Against	Pts
Easkey	3	2	0	1	1-40	1-24	4
Tubbercurry	3	2	0	1	5-27	1-30	4
Castleconnor	3	2	0	1	0-37	3-29	4
Grange/Cliffoney	3	0	0	3	2-22	3-43	0

=== Group C ===
Date	Venue	Team A	Score	Team B	Score
24 July	Markievicz Park	St. Mary's	0-9	Coolera/Strandhill	1-5
24 July	Tubbercurry	Tourlestrane	1-14	Shamrock Gaels	1-9
31 July	Markievicz Park	St. Mary's	2-11	Shamrock Gaels	3-8
1 August	Markievicz Park	Tourlestrane	0-13	Coolera/Strandhill	0-10
8 August	Tubbercurry	Tourlestrane	1-13	St. Mary's	3-5
8 August	Markievicz Park	Shamrock Gaels	0-14	Coolera/Strandhill	2-7

Team	Pld	W	D	L	For	Against	Pts
Tourlestrane	3	3	0	0	2-40	4-24	6
St. Mary's	3	1	1	1	5-25	5-26	3
Shamrock Gaels	3	1	1	1	4-31	5-32	3
Coolera/Strandhill	3	0	0	3	3-22	0-36	0

== Playoffs ==
Game	Date	Venue	Team A	Score	Team B	Score
Sligo SFC; Group C Playoff	15 August	Markievicz Park	Shamrock Gaels	2-9	St. Mary's	0-13
Sligo SFC; Group B Playoff	15 August	Markievicz Park	Tubbercurry	0-11	Castleconnor	1-7
Sligo SFC; Group A Playoff	15 August	Tourlestrane	Eastern Harps	1-12	Curry	0-11
Sligo SFC; Group B Playoff	21 August	Markievicz Park	Easkey	1-12	Tubbercurry	1-9
Sligo SFC; Playoff	28 August	Markievicz Park	Tubbercurry	--	Shamrock Gaels	--
Sligo SFC; Playoff	5 September	Markievicz Park	Tubbercurry	2-11	Shamrock Gaels	0-14
Sligo SFC; Playoff	11 September	Tourlestrane	Tubbercurry	0-13	Curry	1-7

== Semi-finals ==
Game	Date	Venue	Team A	Score	Team B	Score
Sligo SFC; Semi-Final	5 September	Markievicz Park	Easkey	3-7	Eastern Harps	1-10
Sligo SFC; Semi-Final	19 September	Tubbercurry	Tourlestrane	3-15	Tubbercurry	1-9

== Sligo Senior Football Championship Final ==
Tourlestrane	1-11 - 1-9 (final score after 60 minutes)	Easkey
Manager:Neil Egan Team: R. Kennedy; L. Gaughan; P. Egan; D. Henry; S. King; D. Durkin; S. Curley; E. O'Hara (0-2)(Capt); C. O'Meara; B. Egan; M. Walsh (0-3); S. Dunne (0-1); F. Kennedy; E. Walsh; G. McGowan (1-5) Substitutes: N. Manley	Half-time: 1-6 - 0-3 Competition: Sligo Senior Football Championship (Final) Date: 15.30 BST; Sunday, 3 October 1999 Venue: Markievicz Park, Sligo Referee: Eddie Watters (Coolera/Strandhill) Match rules: 60 minutes. Replay if scores still level. Maximum of 5 substitutions.	Manager:Padraig Gibson Team: G. Curley; D. Rolston; E. Sweeney; M. Rolston; J. Rolston; J. Cawley; P. Clarke; D. Keaveney (Capt); N. McGuire (0-3); B. Rolston (0-1); D. Sloyane (0-3); S. Feeney; P. Hallinan; F. Feeney (1-2); M. Kelly Substitutes: V. Cuffe
