= 1972 Sligo Senior Football Championship =

Gaelic football competition

Sligo Senior Football Championship 1972
Tournament details
- County: Sligo
- Year: 1972

Winners
- Champions: Curry (4th win)

Promotion/Relegation
- Promoted team(s): n/a
- Relegated team(s): n/a

This is a round-up of the 1972 Sligo Senior Football Championship. Curry were champions in this year, claiming their second title in a decade, after defeating Enniscrone in the final. The holders, St. Patrick's, were surprisingly defeated in the opening round by Mullinabreena, which was their only Championship loss between 1970 and 1974.

== First round ==
Game	Date	Venue	Team A	Score	Team B	Score
Sligo SFC; First Round	6 August	Ballymote	Curry	2-6	Collooney/Ballisodare	0-5
Sligo SFC; First Round	6 August	Tubbercurry	Tourlestrane	beat	Tubbercurry	(17 pts.)
Sligo SFC; First Round	6 August	Tubbercurry	Mullinabreena	beat	St. Patrick's	(3 pts.)
Sligo SFC; First Round	6 August	Markievicz Park	Shamrock Gaels	0-9	Easkey	0-9
Sligo SFC; First Round Replay	13 August	Markievicz Park	Shamrock Gaels	2-9	Easkey	0-7

== Quarter-finals ==
Game	Date	Venue	Team A	Score	Team B	Score
Sligo SFC; Quarter-final	20 August	Tubbercurry	Mullinabreena	w/o	Craobh Rua	scr.
Sligo SFC; Quarter-final	20 August	Tubbercurry	Enniscrone	2-12	Shamrock Gaels	0-6
Sligo SFC; Quarter-final	20 August	Ballymote	Tourlestrane	0-11	Keash	0-9
Sligo SFC; Quarter-final	20 August	Ballymote	Curry	2-15	Coolera	2-6

== Semi-finals ==
Game	Date	Venue	Team A	Score	Team B	Score
Sligo SFC; Semi-final	27 August	Tubbercurry	Curry	2-9	Tourlestrane	2-6
Sligo SFC; Semi-final	27 August	Tubbercurry	Enniscrone	3-7	Mullinabreena	1-7

== Sligo Senior Football Championship Final ==
Curry	1-10 - 0-5 (final score after 60 minutes)	Enniscrone
Team: T. Duffy; P. Colleary; P. Doohan; M. Colleary; A. Brennan; J. Kivlehan; A. Colleran; T. Colleary; J. Stenson; A. Colleary; J. Colleary; D. Brennan; C. Brennan; O. Henry; M. Marren Substitutes: W.B. Colleran; S.Brett	Half-time: Competition: Sligo Senior Football Championship (Final) Date: 10 September 1972 Venue: Markievicz Park, Sligo Referee: Padraig Lang	Team: M. Jacob; P. McManus; A. Caffrey; E. Murphy; P. O'Brien; L. Caffrey; E. Harte; K. Kilcawley; P.J. Kavanagh; P. Tighe; B. Murphy (Capt.); B. Flynn; E. O'Dowd; J. McManus; J. Fleming Substitutes: R. Beglan; P.J. Hallinan; B. Burke
