= 2002 Sligo Senior Football Championship =

Football tournament held in Ireland

Tournament details
- County: Sligo
- Year: 2002

Winners
- Champions: Eastern Harps (5th win)
- Manager: Eamon Clarke
- Captain: Brendan Phillips

Promotion/Relegation
- Promoted team(s): St. Patrick's, Dromard
- Relegated team(s): Cloonacool

This is a round-up of the 2002 Sligo Senior Football Championship. Eastern Harps claimed their fifth title in this year, defeating Coolera/Strandhill after a replay, and prolonging the latter's long wait for glory. The participants were expanded from 12 to 14, and relegation playoffs were introduced for this year, with Cloonacool the first to be relegated.

== Group stages ==
The Championship was contested by 14 teams, divided into four groups. The top two sides in each group advanced to the quarter-finals, with the remaining sides facing the Relegation playoffs to retain Senior status for 2003.

=== Group A ===
Date	Venue	Team A	Score	Team B	Score
24 August	Markievicz Park	Eastern Harps	0-13	St. Mary's	0-13
25 August	Ballintogher	Drumcliffe/Rosses Point	1-10	Cloonacool	0-8
31 August	Easkey	St. Mary's	4-15	Cloonacool	2-4
31 August	Markievicz Park	Eastern Harps	2-11	Drumcliffe/Rosses Point	1-5
7 September	Tubbercurry	Eastern Harps	0-13	Cloonacool	0-5
7 September	Markievicz Park	St. Mary's	1-9	Drumcliffe/Rosses Point	1-3

Team	Pld	W	D	L	For	Against	Pts
St. Mary's	3	2	1	0	5-37	3-20	5
Eastern Harps	3	2	1	0	2-37	1-23	5
Drumcliffe/Rosses Point	3	1	0	2	3-18	3-28	2
Cloonacool	3	0	0	3	2-17	5-38	0

=== Group B ===
Date	Venue	Team A	Score	Team B	Score
24 August	Tubbercurry	Curry	0-12	Easkey	0-9
25 August	Ballymote	Bunninadden	1-12	Shamrock Gaels	0-7
1 September	Tubbercurry	Curry	0-12	Bunninadden	0-6
1 September	Markievicz Park	Easkey	1-10	Shamrock Gaels	1-9
8 September	Tubbercurry	Curry	5-14	Shamrock Gaels	1-7
8 September	Markievicz Park	Easkey	0-14	Bunninadden	0-11

Team	Pld	W	D	L	For	Against	Pts
Curry	3	3	0	0	5-38	1-22	6
Easkey	3	2	0	1	1-33	1-32	4
Bunninadden	3	1	0	2	1-29	0-33	2
Shamrock Gaels	3	0	0	3	2-23	7-36	0

=== Group C ===
Date	Venue	Team A	Score	Team B	Score
24 August	Easkey	Coolera/Strandhill	1-8	Castleconnor	0-5
1 September	Ballymote	Coolera/Strandhill	0-13	Tourlestrane	0-10
8 September	Kent Park	Tourlestrane	1-6	Castleconnor	0-4

Team	Pld	W	D	L	For	Against	Pts
Coolera/Strandhill	2	2	0	0	1-21	0-15	4
Tourlestrane	2	1	0	1	1-16	0-17	2
Castleconnor	2	0	0	2	0-9	2-14	0

=== Group D ===
Date	Venue	Team A	Score	Team B	Score
24 August	Kent Park	Tubbercurry	1-7	St. John's	0-3
1 September	Kent Park	Grange/Cliffoney	1-12	Tubbercurry	1-5
8 September	Kent Park	St. John's	4-13	Grange/Cliffoney	0-7

Team	Pld	W	D	L	For	Against	Pts
St. John's	2	1	0	1	4-16	1-14	2
Tubbercurry	2	1	0	1	2-12	2-15	2
Grange/Cliffoney	2	1	0	1	1-19	5-18	2

== Playoff ==
There was one playoff required, in Group D where Grange/Cliffoney eliminated Tubbercurry from the Championship.

Game	Date	Venue	Team A	Score	Team B	Score
Sligo SFC; Playoff	14 September	Kent Park	Grange/Cliffoney	2-8	Tubbercurry	1-10

== Quarterfinals ==
Game	Date	Venue	Team A	Score	Team B	Score
Sligo SFC; Quarter Final	15 September	Tubbercurry	Tourlestrane	0-14	St. John's	0-5
Sligo SFC; Quarter Final	15 September	Tubbercurry	Eastern Harps	2-7	Curry	0-8
Sligo SFC; Quarter Final	15 September	Markievicz Park	St. Mary's	1-9	Easkey	1-8
Sligo SFC; Quarter Final	21 September	Markievicz Park	Coolera/Strandhill	0-11	Grange/Cliffoney	0-6

== Semifinals ==
Game	Date	Venue	Team A	Score	Team B	Score
Sligo SFC; Semi-Final	29 September	Tubbercurry	Eastern Harps	0-15	Tourlestrane	1-11
Sligo SFC; Semi-Final	29 September	Markievicz Park	Coolera/Strandhill	1-7	St. Mary's	0-9

== Last eight ==
Quarterfinals; 15 September/September 21
Eastern Harps	2-7
Curry	0-8
St. John's	0-5
Tourlestrane	0-14
Coolera/Strandhill	0-11
Grange/Cliffoney	0-6
St. Mary's	1-9
Easkey	1-8

Semifinals; 29 September
Eastern Harps	0-15
Tourlestrane	1-11
Coolera/Strandhill	1-7
St. Mary's	0-9

Final; 6 October/October 12
Eastern Harps	0-9, 0-12 (R)
Coolera/Strandhill	0-9, 0-8 (R)

== Sligo Senior Football Championship Final ==
Eastern Harps	0-9 - 0-9 (final score after 60 minutes)	Coolera/Strandhill
Manager:Eamon Clarke Team: P. Walsh; F. Candon; K. Phillips; M. Cosgrove; P. McGovern; B. Phillips (Capt); F. Sexton; P. Grady; M. McCormack; M. Doddy (0-1); K. Carty (0-2); P. Henry; S. Gallagher (0-2); P. Taylor (0-1); S. Dorrian (0-3) Substitutes: R. Donovan; J. Bruen	Half-time: 0-6 - 0-5 Competition: Sligo Senior Football Championship (Final) Date: Sunday, 6 October 2002 Venue: Markievicz Park, Sligo Referee: Marty Duffy (Enniscrone)	Manager:Declan McCabe Team: J. Curran; R. Doyle; N. Carew (0-1); K. Cooney; T. Watters; J. McPartland (Capt)(0-1); S. O'Neill; C. O'Meara; K. Quinn (0-3); S. Carty (0-1); K. O'Neill; B. Doyle; C. Mullen; J. Joyce (0-1); T. McMahon Substitutes: K. Gilligan (0-1); L. Healy (0-1); P. Hegarty

== Sligo Senior Football Championship Final Replay ==
Eastern Harps	0-12 - 0-8 (final score after 60 minutes)	Coolera/Strandhill
Manager:Eamon Clarke Team: P. Walsh; F. Candon; K. Phillips; M. Cosgrove; P. McGovern; B. Phillips (Capt); F. Sexton; P. Grady; M. McCormack; M. Doddy; K. Carty; P. Henry; S. Gallagher (0-4); P. Taylor (0-1); S. Dorrian (0-7) Substitutes: K. Casey; R. Donovan; J. Bruen; T. Taylor	Half-time: 0-5 - 0-2 Competition: Sligo Senior Football Championship (Final) Date: Saturday, 12 October 2002 Venue: Markievicz Park, Sligo Referee: Marty Duffy (Enniscrone)	Manager:Declan McCabe Team: J. Curran; R. Doyle; K. Cooney; K. O'Neill; T. Watters; N. Carew; S. O'Neill; K. Quinn (0-3); S. Carty; B. Doyle; J. Joyce; T. McMahon; L. Healy (0-1); J. McPartland (Capt)(0-4); P. Hegarty Substitutes: C. Quinn; M. Howley

== Relegation ==
Game	Date	Venue	Team A	Score	Team B	Score
Sligo SFC; Relegation Playoff	15 September	Ballymote	Bunninadden	2-11	Drumcliffe/Rosses Point	1-5
Sligo SFC; Relegation Playoff	21 September	Tubbercurry	Tubbercurry	1-9	Cloonacool	1-4
Sligo SFC; Relegation Playoff	28 September	Ballymote	Shamrock Gaels	1-13	Cloonacool	1-8
Sligo SFC; Relegation Playoff	28 September	Kent Park	Castleconnor	0-13	Drumcliffe/Rosses Point	2-5
Sligo SFC; Relegation Playoff Final	5 October	Kent Park	Drumcliffe/Rosses Point	1-6	Cloonacool	0-5
