= 1971 Sligo Senior Football Championship =

Gaelic football competition

Sligo Senior Football Championship 1971
Tournament details
- County: Sligo
- Year: 1971

Winners
- Champions: St. Patrick's, Dromard (3rd win)

Promotion/Relegation
- Promoted team(s): n/a
- Relegated team(s): n/a

This is a round-up of the 1971 Sligo Senior Football Championship. St. Patrick's, Dromard claimed their third title, and completed back-to-back wins in the process. Tubbercurry returned to the final after a 14-year absence, but it was in vain, as St. Patrick's cantered to an easy victory, with Micheal Kearins, who became Sligo's first All-Star recipient later that year, leading the winners' onslaught.

== First round ==
Game	Date	Venue	Team A	Score	Team B	Score
Sligo SFC; First Round	8 August	Ballymote	Tourlestrane	5-8	Muire Naofa	1-4
Sligo SFC; First Round	8 August	Ballymote	Tubbercurry	6-9	Curry	2-8
Sligo SFC; First Round	8 August	Tubbercurry	Easkey	3-8	Keash	2-4
Sligo SFC; First Round	8 August	Tubbercurry	St. Patrick’s	2-17	Collooney/Ballisodare	1-8
Sligo SFC; First Round	8 August	Markievicz Park	Sooey/Coolera	1-12	Mullinabreena	1-7
Sligo SFC; First Round	8 August	Markievicz Park	Enniscrone	2-6	Grange	1-6

== Quarter-finals ==
Game	Date	Venue	Team A	Score	Team B	Score
Sligo SFC; Quarter-final	15 August	Tubbercurry	Easkey	2-9	Enniscrone	0-8
Sligo SFC; Quarter-final	15 August	Tubbercurry	St. Patrick’s	2-11	Craobh Rua	1-4
Sligo SFC; Quarter-final	15 August	Ballymote	Sooey/Coolera	drew	Tourlestrane	(no score)
Sligo SFC; Quarter-final	15 August	Ballymote	Tubbercurry	1-6	Knockalassa/Ballymote	0-3
Sligo SFC; Quarter-final Replay	22 August	Ballymote	Sooey/Coolera	1-5	Tourlestrane	0-5

== Semi-finals ==
Game	Date	Venue	Team A	Score	Team B	Score
Sligo SFC; Semi-final	5 September	Markievicz Park	Tubbercurry	4-4	Easkey	1-10
Sligo SFC; Semi-final	5 September	Markievicz Park	St. Patrick’s	1-19	Sooey/Coolera	1-1

== Sligo Senior Football Championship Final ==
St. Patrick's	2-16 - 1-5 (final score after 60 minutes)	Tubbercurry
Team: T. Cummins; E. Rushe; A. Boland; P.J. Kilcullen; S. Donegan; J. Cuffe; J. Kiely; M. Kearins; J. Kilgallon; P. McMunn; R. Boland; P. Kearins; L. Boland; S. Beckett; B. Kilcullen Substitutes:	Half-time: Competition: Sligo Senior Football Championship (Final) Date: 19 September 1971 Venue: Markievicz Park, Sligo Referee: S. Glennon	Team: S. Henry; M. Burke; H. Gallagher; M. Phillips; O. Leonard; M. Kilcoyne; P. Gorman; L. Gormley; P. Hunt; M. Noone; P. Kilcoyne; J. Kilcoyne; T. Kavanagh; P.J. Brennan; O. Gormley Substitutes:
