= 1967 Sligo Senior Football Championship =

Gaelic football competition

Sligo Senior Football Championship 1967
Tournament details
- County: Sligo
- Year: 1967

Winners
- Champions: Collooney/Ballisodare (1st win)

Promotion/Relegation
- Promoted team(s): n/a
- Relegated team(s): n/a

This is a round-up of the 1967 Sligo Senior Football Championship. The combined forces of Collooney and Ballisodare claimed the title in this year, having already claimed five of the previous seven titles in the decade as separate clubs. They defeated holders Easkey, after a replay, in the final.

== First round ==
Game	Date	Venue	Team A	Score	Team B	Score
Sligo SFC; First Round	18 June	Ballymote	Collooney/Ballisodare	beat	Enniscrone	(no score)

== Quarter-finals ==
Game	Date	Venue	Team A	Score	Team B	Score
Sligo SFC; Quarter-final	18 June	Tubbercurry	Tourlestrane	beat	Ballymote	(no score)
Sligo SFC; Quarter-final	18 June	Tubbercurry	Bunninadden	beat	Curry	(no score)
Sligo SFC; Quarter-final	9 July	Ballymote	Collooney/Ballisodare	3-8	Craobh Rua	1-3
Sligo SFC; Quarter-final	16 July	Markievicz Park	Easkey	5-5	Tubbercurry	2-2

== Semi-finals ==
Game	Date	Venue	Team A	Score	Team B	Score
Sligo SFC; Semi-final	13 August	Ballymote	Easkey	4-10	Tourlestrane	1-4
Sligo SFC; Semi-final	13 August	Ballymote	Collooney/Ballisodare	1-8	Bunninadden	0-3

== Sligo Senior Football Championship Final ==
Collooney/Ballisodare	1-3 - 0-6 (final score after 60 minutes)	Easkey
Team: Substitutes:	Half-time: Competition: Sligo Senior Football Championship (Final) Date: 3 September 1967 Venue: Markievicz Park, Sligo Referee:	Team: Substitutes:

=== Sligo Senior Football Championship Final Replay ===
Collooney/Ballisodare	1-6 - 1-5 (final score after 60 minutes)	Easkey
Team: T. Tighe; M. Flynn; C. Lynch; T. McLoughlin; M. Molloy; T. Gray; D. Martin; B. McAuley; R. Henry; P. Hannon; J. Mitchell; D. Hogge; P. Walsh; T. Weir; P. Watters Substitutes: D. Whittaker	Half-time: Competition: Sligo Senior Football Championship (Final) Date: 8 October 1967 Venue: Markievicz Park, Sligo Referee: F. McGowan (Carney)	Team: P. Brady; M. Keaveney; J.P. McGuire; M. Taylor; P.J. Lyons; T. Roddy; V. Cuffe; E. Mullen; M. Kenny; F. Lyons; M. McHugh; O. McHugh; P.J. Sloyane; S. Calleary; S. Rolston Substitutes:
