= 1984 Sligo Senior Football Championship =

Gaelic football competition

Tournament details
- County: Sligo
- Year: 1984

Winners
- Champions: St. Mary's (6th win)
- Captain: Michael Laffey

Promotion/Relegation
- Promoted team(s): Geevagh
- Relegated team(s): Coolera

This is a round-up of the 1984 Sligo Senior Football Championship. In Centenary Year, it was St. Mary's who retained the title, defeating Tubbercurry in a disappointing final. The champions had been brought to a replay by Curry in the semi-final, however St. Mary's won that replay with ease.

== Quarter finals ==
Game	Date	Venue	Team A	Score	Team B	Score
Sligo SFC; Quarter Final	15 July	Markievicz Park	Tubbercurry	0-12	St. Patrick’s	1-7
Sligo SFC; Quarter Final	15 July	Markievicz Park	St. Mary’s	1-13	Grange	0-4
Sligo SFC; Quarter Final	15 July	Tubbercurry	Coolera	2-6	Eastern Harps	2-6
Sligo SFC; Quarter Final	15 July	Tubbercurry	Curry	2-7	Tourlestrane	1-8
Sligo SFC; Quarter Final Replay	22 July	Tubbercurry	Coolera	3-5	Eastern Harps	0-8

== Semi-finals ==
Game	Date	Venue	Team A	Score	Team B	Score
Sligo SFC; Semi-Final	5 August	Ballymote	St. Mary’s	2-3	Curry	0-9
Sligo SFC; Semi-Final	5 August	Ballymote	Tubbercurry	1-12	Coolera	0-4
Sligo SFC; Semi-Final Replay	12 August	Ballymote	St. Mary’s	2-10	Curry	0-5

== Sligo Senior Football Championship Final ==
St. Mary's	0-7 - 0-3 (final score after 60 minutes)	Tubbercurry
Team: G. Young; T. Foley; H. Gilvarry; J. McGowan; T. Carroll; G. Finan; T. Dalton; B. Jones; G. Monaghan; John Kent; J. Crehan; M. Laffey (Capt); J. Bird; Jim Kent; R. Henneberry Substitutes:	Half-time: Competition: Sligo Senior Football Championship (Final) Date: 26 August 1984 Venue: Markievicz Park, Sligo Referee: Michael Donnellan (Ballymote)	Team: O. Wynne; L. Gilmartin; G. Gilmartin; J. Stenson; P. Regan; P. Gilmartin; P. McCarrick; J. Kilcoyne; E. Gilmartin; R. McCarrick; J. Murphy; F. Ryan; J.J. Gorham; N. Killoran; P. Donoghoe Substitutes:
