= 1990 Sligo Senior Football Championship =

Gaelic football competition

Tournament details
- County: Sligo
- Year: 1990

Winners
- Champions: Shamrock Gaels (1st win)
- Manager: Vincent Henry
- Captain: John Quinn

Promotion/Relegation
- Promoted team(s): Easkey
- Relegated team(s): n/a

This is a round-up of the 1990 Sligo Senior Football Championship. Shamrock Gaels claimed their first ever senior title in this year, in their first final appearance, defeating fellow outsiders Curry in the process. This year's final was the first which Tubbercurry did not contest since 1982.

== First round ==
Game	Date	Venue	Team A	Score	Team B	Score
Sligo SFC; First Round	8 July	Keash	Shamrock Gaels	0-10	Tourlestrane	0-7
Sligo SFC; First Round	8 July	Keash	Geevagh	0-6	St. Patrick's	0-6
Sligo SFC; First Round	15 July	Tubbercurry	Easkey/St. Farnan’s	2-9	St. Nathy’s	0-12
Sligo SFC; First Round	15 July	Tubbercurry	Coolera/Strandhill	3-8	Grange/Cliffoney/Maugherow	1-9
Sligo SFC; First Round	15 July	Easkey	Eastern Harps	0-12	Enniscrone/Castleconnor	1-5
Sligo SFC; First Round	15 July	Easkey	St. Mary's	1-15	Innisfree Gaels	2-3
Sligo SFC; First Round Replay	15 July	Keash	Geevagh	0-9	St. Patrick's	1-6
Sligo SFC; First Round Second Replay	21 July	Tubbercurry	Geevagh	1-6	St. Patrick's	0-7

== Quarter finals ==
Game	Date	Venue	Team A	Score	Team B	Score
Sligo SFC; Quarter Final	29 July	Tubbercurry	Shamrock Gaels	2-10	Eastern Harps	2-8
Sligo SFC; Quarter Final	29 July	Enniscrone	Tubbercurry	2-10	Coolera/Strandhill	1-6
Sligo SFC; Quarter Final	29 July	Enniscrone	St. Mary’s	0-14	Geevagh	2-6
Sligo SFC; Quarter Final	5 August	Tubbercurry	Curry	0-9	Easkey/St. Farnan’s	0-8

== Semi-finals ==
Game	Date	Venue	Team A	Score	Team B	Score
Sligo SFC; Semi-Final	26 August	Keash	Shamrock Gaels	2-11	Tubbercurry	2-6
Sligo SFC; Semi-Final	26 August	Keash	Curry	0-9	St. Mary's	1-4

== Sligo Senior Football Championship Final ==
Shamrock Gaels	3-7 - 0-7 (final score after 60 minutes)	Curry
Team: P. Kearins; B. Deignan; M. Touhy; M. Conlon; J. Kearins; N. Willis; T. McDermott; G. Ballantyne; J. White; J. Kenny (1-1); L. Quinn (0-3); B. Mulhern (0-1); C. Kearins (1-0); T. Deignan (1-0); E. Deignan (0-2) Substitutes: K. McDermott; J. Quinn; E. Carroll	Half-time: 1-2 - 0-4 Competition: Sligo Senior Football Championship (Final) Date: 9 September 1990 Venue: Kent Park, Sligo Referee: Micheal Kearins (St. Patrick's)	Team: T. Gannon; M. Marren; P. Durcan; P. Hayes; F. Henry; M. Hayes; P.J. Burke; J. Stenson; M. Haran; T. Howley (0-1); E. Henry (0-2); D. Henry; P. Beirne; A. Colleary (0-1); J. Henry (0-3) Substitutes: D. Henry; P. Gannon
