= 1975 Sligo Senior Football Championship =

Gaelic football competition

Sligo Senior Football Championship 1975
Tournament details
- County: Sligo
- Year: 1975

Winners
- Champions: Eastern Harps (1st win)

Promotion/Relegation
- Promoted team(s): Grange
- Relegated team(s): Easkey

This is a round-up of the 1975 Sligo Senior Football Championship. Eastern Harps claimed their first title in only their third year in existence, after defeating Craobh Rua in the final. This was the last hurrah for Craobh Rua - they would later join forces with Muire Naofa to form the St. Mary's club for the following year.

== Group stages ==
The Championship was contested by 15 teams, divided into four groups. The top side in each group advanced to the semi-finals.

=== Group A ===
Date	Venue	Team A	Score	Team B	Score
17 August	Tubbercurry	Curry	0-10	Mullinabreena	1-3
31 August	Markievicz Park	Easkey	--	Mullinabreena	-- (N.R.)
7 September	Markievicz Park	Curry	beat	Easkey	(no score)

Team	Pld	W	D	L	Pts
Curry	2	2	0	0	4
Easkey	1	0	0	1	0
Mullinabreena	1	0	0	1	0

=== Group B ===
Date	Venue	Team A	Score	Team B	Score
17 August	Tubbercurry	Eastern Harps	beat	Coolera	(no score)
17 August	Easkey	Tourlestrane	1-7	Enniscrone	0-5
24 August	Tubbercurry	Eastern Harps	beat	Enniscrone	(no score)
24 August	Ballymote	Tourlestrane	beat	Coolera	(no score)
31 August	Tubbercurry	Eastern Harps	beat	Tourlestrane	(6 pts)
31 August	Easkey	Coolera	--	Enniscrone	-- (N.R.)

Team	Pld	W	D	L	Pts
Eastern Harps	3	3	0	0	6
Tourlestrane	3	2	0	1	4
Coolera	2	0	0	2	0
Enniscrone	2	0	0	2	0

=== Group C ===
Date	Venue	Team A	Score	Team B	Score
17 August	Ballymote	Geevagh	4-11	Collooney/Ballisodare	1-6
17 August	Markievicz Park	St. Patrick's	0-13	Muire Naofa	0-7
24 August	Tubbercurry	St. Patrick's	beat	Geevagh	(no score)
24 August	Markievicz Park	Collooney/Ballisodare	2-5	Muire Naofa	1-7
31 August	Markievicz Park	St. Patrick's	beat	Collooney/Ballisodare	(no score)
31 August	Ballymote	Geevagh	beat	Muire Naofa	(no score)

Team	Pld	W	D	L	Pts
St. Patrick's	3	3	0	0	6
Geevagh	3	2	0	1	4
Collooney/Ballisodare	3	1	0	2	2
Muire Naofa	3	0	0	3	0

=== Group D ===
Date	Venue	Team A	Score	Team B	Score
17 August	Ballymote	Craobh Rua	0-14	Shamrock Gaels	0-7
17 August	Markievicz Park	Tubbercurry	4-11	St. Farnan's	1-9
24 August	Easkey	Craobh Rua	beat	St. Farnan's	(no score)
24 August	Ballymote	Shamrock Gaels	beat	Tubbercurry	(no score)
31 August	Tubbercurry	Shamrock Gaels	P	St. Farnan's	P
31 August	Ballymote	Craobh Rua	2-7	Tubbercurry	1-8

Team	Pld	W	D	L	Pts
Craobh Rua	3	3	0	0	6
Tubbercurry	3	2	0	1	2
Shamrock Gaels	2	1	0	1	2
St. Farnan's	2	0	0	2	0

== Semi-finals ==
Game	Date	Venue	Team A	Score	Team B	Score
Sligo SFC; Semi-final	14 September	Tubbercurry	Craobh Rua	3-10	Curry	0-4
Sligo SFC; Semi-final	14 September	Tubbercurry	Eastern Harps	4-4	St. Patrick's	0-10

== Sligo Senior Football Championship Final ==
Eastern Harps	1-8 - 0-5 (final score after 60 minutes)	Craobh Rua
Team: Substitutes:	Half-time: Competition: Sligo Senior Football Championship (Final) Date: 5 October 1975 Venue: Corran Park, Ballymote Referee:	Team: Substitutes:
