= 1980 Sligo Senior Football Championship =

Gaelic football competition

Sligo Senior Football Championship 1980
Tournament details
- County: Sligo
- Year: 1980

Winners
- Champions: St. Mary's (3rd win)

Promotion/Relegation
- Promoted team(s): Curry
- Relegated team(s): Enniscrone

This is a round-up of the 1980 Sligo Senior Football Championship. St. Mary's retained the title after defeating Eastern Harps in the most one-sided final in the competition's history.

== Quarter finals ==
| Game | Date | Venue | Team A | Score | Team B | Score |
|---|---|---|---|---|---|---|
| Sligo SFC; Quarter Final | 29 June | Ballymote | St. Mary’s | 3-8 | Shamrock Gaels | 2-7 |
| Sligo SFC; Quarter Final | 29 June | Markievicz Park | St. Patrick’s | 0-13 | Tubbercurry | 2-3 |
| Sligo SFC; Quarter Final | 6 July | Tubbercurry | Eastern Harps | 3-11 | Enniscrone | 1-11 |
| Sligo SFC; Quarter Final | 6 July | Ballymote | Coolera | 1-10 | Tourlestrane | 0-9 |

== Semi-finals ==
| Game | Date | Venue | Team A | Score | Team B | Score |
|---|---|---|---|---|---|---|
| Sligo SFC; Semi-Final | 17 August | Ballymote | St. Mary’s | 2-19 | St. Patrick's | 1-8 |
| Sligo SFC; Semi-Final | 17 August | Ballymote | Eastern Harps | 0-11 | Coolera | 0-9 |

== Sligo Senior Football Championship Final ==
| St. Mary's | 8-7 - 1-7 (final score after 60 minutes) | Eastern Harps |
| Team: E. Eames; C. O'Donnell; J. McNamara; K. Delaney; T. Carroll; M. Barrett; J. McGowan; M. Laffey; G. Monaghan; E. McHale (1-3); B. Murphy; G. Hennigan (1-1); E. Delahunt (3-1); Jim Kent (3-2); R. Henneberry Substitutes: M. Walsh | Half-time: Competition: Sligo Senior Football Championship (Final) Date: 31 August 1980 Venue: Markievicz Park, Sligo Referee: | Team: B. Tansey; M. Reid; F. Casey; D. Garvin; M. Hannon; P. Gallagher; F. Gallagher; E. Clarke; R. Taylor; D. O'Hara; D. Johnson (0-1); S. Gallagher (0-1); P. Molloy (0-5); R. Tansey; O. Garvin (1-0) Substitutes: |
