= 2005 Sligo Senior Football Championship =

Gaelic football competition

Tournament details
- County: Sligo
- Year: 2005

Winners
- Champions: Coolera/Strandhill (2nd win)
- Manager: Alan Kelly
- Captain: Neil Carew/Con O'Meara

Promotion/Relegation
- Promoted team(s): Coolaney/Mullinabreena
- Relegated team(s): n/a

This is a round-up of the 2005 Sligo Senior Football Championship. The year saw Coolera, who had suffered two final defeats earlier in the decade, end their long wait for Championship glory, stretching back to 1907. They defeated Curry in the final, who had disposed of the holders Tourlestrane after a semi-final replay. No team was relegated in 2005, in order to bring the number of competing teams up to 16 in 2006.

== Group stages ==
The Championship was contested by 15 teams, divided into three groups of four, and one of three. The top two sides in each group advanced to the quarter-finals.

=== Group A ===
Date	Venue	Team A	Score	Team B	Score
24 July	Ballymote	Bunninadden	1-14	St. Molaise Gaels	1-4
24 July	Ballymote	Calry/St. Joseph's	1-15	Tubbercurry	0-8
6 August	Ballymote	Tubbercurry	1-15	Bunninadden	0-12
6 August	Markievicz Park	Calry/St. Joseph's	1-16	St. Molaise Gaels	0-7
13 August	Kent Park	Tubbercurry	0-15	St. Molaise Gaels	0-4
14 August	Markievicz Park	Bunninadden	1-9	Calry/St. Joseph's	0-6

Team	Pld	W	D	L	For	Against	Pts
Calry/St. Joseph's	3	2	0	1	2-37	1-24	4
Bunninadden	3	2	0	1	2-35	2-25	4
Tubbercurry	3	2	0	1	1-38	1-31	4
St. Molaise Gaels	3	0	0	3	1-15	2-45	0

=== Group B ===
Date	Venue	Team A	Score	Team B	Score
21 July	Tubbercurry	Coolera/Strandhill	2-7	Castleconnor	0-10
24 July	Tubbercurry	Curry	1-12	St. Mary's	1-6
7 August	Tubbercurry	Coolera/Strandhill	1-7	Curry	0-9
7 August	Tubbercurry	Castleconnor	1-7	St. Mary's	0-10
14 August	Markievicz Park	Coolera/Strandhill	1-13	St. Mary's	0-6
14 August	Easkey	Curry	1-13	Castleconnor	1-8

Team	Pld	W	D	L	For	Against	Pts
Coolera/Strandhill	3	3	0	0	4-27	0-25	6
Curry	3	2	0	1	2-34	3-21	4
Castleconnor	3	0	1	2	2-25	3-30	1
St. Mary's	3	0	1	2	1-22	3-32	1

=== Group C ===
Date	Venue	Team A	Score	Team B	Score
24 July	Markievicz Park	Tourlestrane	1-15	Shamrock Gaels	0-7
24 July	Markievicz Park	Drumcliffe/Rosses Point	1-10	St. John's	2-5
7 August	Markievicz Park	Drumcliffe/Rosses Point	0-9	Shamrock Gaels	0-9
7 August	Enniscrone	Tourlestrane	0-15	St. John's	0-7
13 August	Markievicz Park	Tourlestrane	1-13	Drumcliffe/Rosses Point	1-6
14 August	Ballymote	Shamrock Gaels	0-14	St. John's	1-11

Team	Pld	W	D	L	For	Against	Pts
Tourlestrane	3	3	0	0	5-34	4-23	6
Drumcliffe/Rosses Point	3	1	1	1	3-27	2-28	3
Shamrock Gaels	3	0	2	1	4-25	2-33	2
St. John's	3	1	1	2	1-26	5-30	1

=== Group D ===
Date	Venue	Team A	Score	Team B	Score
24 July	Tubbercurry	Eastern Harps	1-14	Ballymote	1-13
7 August	Enniscrone	Easkey	0-12	Ballymote	0-5
14 August	Tubbercurry	Eastern Harps	1-16	Easkey	1-10

Team	Pld	W	D	L	For	Against	Pts
Eastern Harps	2	2	0	0	2-30	2-23	4
Easkey	2	1	0	1	1-22	1-21	2
Ballymote	2	0	0	2	1-18	1-26	0

=== Playoffs ===
Only one group required a playoff. In Group A Calry/St. Joseph's, Bunninadden and Tubbercurry all finished level on points, with Calry/St. Joseph's gaining top spot on scoring difference. Bunninadden and Tubbercurry met in the playoff, and it was Tubber who were victorious, as they had been in the earlier group meeting. This was the fifth year in succession that Bunninadden had not reached the knockout stages, going back to their 2000 title victory.

Group	Date	Venue	Team A	Score	Team B	Score
Group A	21 August	Ballymote	Tubbercurry	1-10	Bunninadden	0-8

== Quarterfinals ==
The quarter finals of the Championship saw the exit of Calry/St. Joseph's, Tubbercurry, Easkey and Drumcliffe/Rosses Point. Curry, Coolera/Strandhill, Tourlestrane and Eastern Harps qualified for the semi-finals. The Tourlestrane/Easkey proved a bizarre affair, with Easkey failing to score for over forty minutes. By then Tourlestrane had racked up 2–10 and were preparing for the semi-finals.

Game	Date	Venue	Team A	Score	Team B	Score
Sligo SFC; Quarter Final	27 August	Markievicz Park	Coolera/Strandhill	1-13	Tubbercurry	1-11
Sligo SFC; Quarter Final	27 August	Markievicz Park	Curry	1-20	Calry/St. Joseph's	1-10
Sligo SFC; Quarter Final	28 August	Markievicz Park	Tourlestrane	2-13	Easkey	0-3
Sligo SFC; Quarter Final	28 August	Markievicz Park	Eastern Harps	1-8	Drumcliffe/Rosses Point	0-8

== Semifinals ==
The semi-finals saw the defeat of reigning champions Tourlestrane, beaten by rivals Curry after a replay. In the other Semi-Final Coolera/Strandhill withstood a late Eastern Harps rally to claim their place in the final.

Game	Date	Venue	Team A	Score	Team B	Score
Sligo SFC; Semi-Final	4 September	Markievicz Park	Coolera/Strandhill	1-10	Eastern Harps	0-12
Sligo SFC; Semi-Final	4 September	Markievicz Park	Curry	1-8	Tourlestrane	0-11
Sligo SFC; Semi-Final Replay (After Extra-Time)	10 September	Markievicz Park	Curry	1-11	Tourlestrane	1-7

== Last eight ==
Quarterfinals; 27 August/August 28
Coolera/Strandhill	1-13
Tubbercurry	1-11
Eastern Harps	1-8
Drumcliffe/Rosses Point	0-8
Curry	1-20
Calry/St. Joseph's	1-10
Tourlestrane	2-13
Easkey	0-3

Semifinals; 4 September
Coolera/Strandhill	1-10
Eastern Harps	0-12
Curry	1-8, 1-11 (R)
Tourlestrane	0-11, 1-7 (R)

Final; 18 September
Coolera/Strandhill	0-10
Curry	0-9

== Sligo Senior Football Championship Final ==
Coolera/Strandhill	0-10 - 0-9 (final score after 60 minutes)	Curry
Manager:Alan Kelly Team: J. Curran; R. O'Connor; K. Cooney; A. Kelly; T. Watters; N. Carew; G. McCarroll; C. O'Meara; K. Quinn (0-1); S. Carty; J. McPartland (0-5); K. O'Neill; S. Quinn (0-1); B. Doyle (0-1); C. Mullen (0-1) Substitutes: C. Quinn (0-1)	Half-time: 0-6 0-4 Competition: Sligo Senior Football Championship (Final) Date: 15.30 BST; Sunday, 18 September 2006 Venue: Markievicz Park, Sligo Referee: Michael Duffy (Enniscrone) Match rules: 60 minutes. Replay if scores still level. Maximum of 5 substitutions.	Manager:Francis Henry Team: J. Durcan; B. Collins; J. Feeney; S. Marren; S. Haran; Barry McDonagh; K. Morley; G. Maye (0-1); S. Davey (0-1); K. Giblin; D. Colleary (0-2); A. Marren (0-2); P. Henry (0-1); P. Durcan; Brian McDonagh (0-2) Substitutes: A. Brennan
