= Sligo Senior Football Championship =

Annual Gaelic football competition

- Irish: Craobh Sinsear Peile; Co. Shligigh
- Founded: 1888
- Title holders: St Mary’s (12th title)
- Most titles: Tubbercurry (20 titles)
- Sponsors: Belfry Bar & Restaurant

The Sligo Senior Football Championship is an annual Gaelic Athletic Association club competition between the top Sligo clubs. The winners of the Sligo Senior Championship qualify to represent the county in the Connacht Senior Club Football Championship and in turn, go on to the All-Ireland Senior Club Football Championship. Tubbercurry remain the most successful club, having won the Championship on 20 occasions, the last in 2014. Coolera/Strandhill are the current champions, having defeated Naomh Molaise Gaels in the 2024 final.

The trophy presented to the winners is the Owen B. Hunt Cup, which was first presented for the 1953 final.

== Top winners ==
#	Club	Wins	Years won	Runner-up	Years runner-up
1	Tubbercurry	20	1890, 1917, 1918, 1924, 1927, 1928, 1930, 1934, 1938, 1939, 1940, 1946, 1950, 1951, 1955, 1957, 1976, 1986, 1991, 2014	18	1922, 1929, 1931, 1945, 1952, 1954, 1956, 1971, 1979, 1983, 1984, 1985, 1987, 1988, 1989, 1993, 2008, 2013, 2018
2	Tourlestrane	18	1956, 1978, 1982, 1994, 1997, 1999, 2004, 2007, 2009, 2011, 2013, 2016, 2017, 2018, 2019, 2020, 2021, 2022	7	1944, 1955, 1960, 1974, 1998, 2010
3	St Mary's	12	1977, 1979, 1980, 1981, 1983, 1984, 1985, 1987, 1996, 2001, 2015, 2026	8	1976, 1986, 1991, 2004, 2012, 2014, 2016, 2022
4	Eastern Harps	7	1975, 1993, 1995, 1998, 2002, 2008, 2010	8	1980, 1981, 1996, 1997, 2003, 2007, 2009, 2017
4	Curry	7	1889, 1922, 1964, 1972, 2003, 2006, 2012	7	1932, 1959, 1961, 1990, 2001, 2005, 2015
4	St Patrick's, Dromard	7	1968, 1970, 1971, 1973, 1974, 1988, 1989	5	1965, 1969, 1977, 1982, 1992
7	Ballisodare	6	1931, 1932, 1960, 1961, 1962, 1963	1	1957
8	Easkey	5	1935, 1936, 1937, 1941, 1966	11	1907, 1910, 1940, 1942, 1947, 1949, 1950, 1951, 1967, 1968, 1999
8	Ballymote	5	1892, 1905, 1913, 1925, 1948	2	1914, 1966
10	Coolera/Strandhill	4	1907, 2005, 2023, 2024	9	1917, 1938, 1939, 1946, 2000, 2002, 2011, 2019, 2021, 2025
10	Craobh Rua	4	1944, 1952, 1953, 1954	3	1963, 1973, 1975
12	Shamrock Gaels	3	1990, 1992, 2025	2	1994, 2026
12	Collooney Harps	3	1942, 1943, 1965	1	1927
13	Bunninadden	2	1891, 2000	1	2006
13	Sooey	2	1949, 1959	3	1889, 1890, 1958
13	Skreen	2	1945, 1947	2	1934, 1948
13	Knocklassa	2	1915, 1933	2	1941, 1943
13	Enniscrone	2	1914, 1916	1	1913
13	Collooney/Ballisodare	2	1967, 1969	0	
13	Sligo Wanderers	2	1909, 1910	0	
21	Kilglass	1	1929	2	1930, 1933
21	Gurteen	1	1906	2	1909, 1924
21	Coolaney-Mullinabreena	1	1958	1	1970
21	Moylough	1	1919	1	1918
21	Sligo Emmets	1	1888	0	

== Finals listed by year ==
Year	Winner	Score	Opponent	Score
2026	St Mary's	1-12	Shamrock Gaels	1-10
2025	Shamrock Gaels	2-16 2-11 (R)	Coolera/Strandhill	3-13 0-08 (R)
2024	Coolera/Strandhill	0-08 (R); 0-09	Naomh Molaise Gaels	0-07 (R); 1-06
2023	Coolera/Strandhill	0-11	Naomh Molaise Gaels	0-08
2022	Tourlestrane	0-15	St Mary's	0-13
2021	Tourlestrane	2-12	Coolera/Strandhill	0-07
2020	Tourlestrane	1-14	Drumcliffe–Rosses Point	1-11
2019	Tourlestrane	2-17	Coolera/Strandhill	0-09
2018	Tourlestrane	1-12	Tubbercurry	0-08
2017	Tourlestrane	1-13	Eastern Harps	1-09
2016	Tourlestrane	1-14	St Mary's	1-07
2015	St Mary's	1-20	Curry	2-11
2014	Tubbercurry	3-12	St Mary's	0-12
2013	Tourlestrane	0-13	Tubbercurry	0-10
2012	Curry	1-16	St Mary's	1-10
2011	Tourlestrane	1-12	Coolera/Strandhill	0-08
2010	Eastern Harps	0-13	Tourlestrane	0-10
2009	Tourlestrane	1-08	Eastern Harps	0-07
2008	Eastern Harps	1-16	Tubbercurry	1-08
2007	Tourlestrane	1-09	Eastern Harps	0-10
2006	Curry	1-15	Bunninadden	2-09
2005	Coolera/Strandhill	0-10	Curry	0-09
2004	Tourlestrane	1-08, 2-09 (R)	St Mary's	2-05, 2-04 (R)
2003	Curry	0-11	Eastern Harps	0-08
2002	Eastern Harps	0-09, 0-12 (R)	Coolera/Strandhill	0-09, 0-08 (R)
2001	St Mary's	1-11	Curry	0-11
2000	Bunninadden	2-07	Coolera/Strandhill	0-11
1999	Tourlestrane	1-11	Easkey	1-09
1998	Eastern Harps	0-09	Tourlestrane	0-06
1997	Tourlestrane	0-16	Eastern Harps	0-08
1996	St Mary's	2-09	Eastern Harps	0-14
1995	Eastern Harps	2-14	Tubbercurry	0-10
1994	Tourlestrane	2-07	Shamrock Gaels	0-08
1993	Eastern Harps	0-12	Tubbercurry	1-08
1992	Shamrock Gaels	2-11	St Patrick's, Dromard	0-08
1991	Tubbercurry	1-08	St Mary's	1-07
1990	Shamrock Gaels	3-07	Curry	0-07
1989	St Patrick's, Dromard	0-11	Tubbercurry	0-10
1988	St Patrick's, Dromard	2-06	Tubbercurry	0-11
1987	St Mary's	1-07	Tubbercurry	1-06
1986	Tubbercurry	1-11	St Mary's	0-10
1985	St Mary's	0-09, 0-08 (R), 1-08 (2ndR)	Tubbercurry	0-09, 2-02 (R), 1-03 (2ndR)
1984	St Mary's	0-07	Tubbercurry	0-03
1983	St Mary's	2-09	Tubbercurry	1-05
1982	Tourlestrane	2-09	St Patrick's, Dromard	2-06
1981	St Mary's	2-09	Eastern Harps	0-04
1980	St Mary's	8-07	Eastern Harps	1-07
1979	St Mary's	0-13	Tubbercurry	1-04
1978	Tourlestrane	2-07	Grange	0-07
1977	St Mary's	1-08	St Patrick's, Dromard	0-05
1976	Tubbercurry	2-05	St Mary's	0-10
1975	Eastern Harps	1-08	Craobh Rua	0-05
1974	St Patrick's, Dromard	0-09	Tourlestrane	2-02
1973	St Patrick's, Dromard	1-10	Craobh Rua	0-08
1972	Curry	1-10	Enniscrone	0-05
1971	St Patrick's, Dromard	2-16	Tubbercurry	1-05
1970	St Patrick's, Dromard	1-13	Coolaney/Mullinabreena	1-05
1969	Collooney/Ballisodare	1-09	St Patrick's, Dromard	2-05
1968	St Patrick's, Dromard	1-08	Easkey	1-02
1967	Collooney/Ballisodare	1-03, 1-06 (R)	Easkey	0-06, 1-05 (R)
1966	Easkey	1-08	Ballymote	0-02
1965	Collooney Harps	2-06	St Patrick's, Dromard	1-07
1964	Curry	1-14	Keash St Kevin's	2-05
1963	Ballisodare/St. Patrick's, Dromard	1-08, 2-10 (R)	Craobh Rua	2-05, 1-05 (R)
1962	Ballisodare/St. Patrick's, Dromard	2-06	Sooey	3-02
1961	Ballisodare	2-03	Curry	0-03
1960	Ballisodare	1-08	Tourlestrane	1-00
1959	Sooey	1-08	Curry	1-03
1958	Coolaney/Mullinabreena	1-12	Sooey	1-08
1957	Tubbercurry	3-04	Ballisodare	1-01
1956	Tourlestrane	4-01	Tubbercurry	0-06
1955	Tubbercurry	1-05	Tourlestrane	0-04
1954	Craobh Rua	1-06	Tubbercurry	0-03
1953	Craobh Rua	1-10	Keash	1-03
1952	Craobh Rua	1-07	Tubbercurry	1-04
1951	Tubbercurry	1-05	Easkey	1-04
1950	Tubbercurry	5-05	Easkey	2-02
1949	Sooey	1-11	Easkey	2-00
1948	Ballymote Round Towers	2-01	Skreen	1-01
1947	Skreen	1-01	Easkey	1-00
1946	Tubbercurry	2-03	Coolera	0-03
1945	Skreen	2-05	Tubbercurry	0-03
1944	Craobh Rua	5-06	Tourlestrane	1-03
1943	Collooney Harps	2-06	Knockalassa	1-04
1942	Collooney Harps	2-04	Easkey Sea Blues	2-02
1941	Easkey Sea Blues	1-01	Knockalassa	0-03
1940	Tubbercurry	(awarded title)	Easkey Sea Blues	
1939	Tubbercurry	2-07	Coolera	0-05
1938	Tubbercurry	0-08	Coolera	1-04
1937	Easkey Sea Blues	3-05	Derroon	1-05
1936	Easkey Sea Blues	3-01	Derroon	0-04
1935	Easkey Sea Blues	0-02 (won on objection)	Knockalassa	2-02
1934	Tubbercurry	2-04	Skreen Emmets	1-02
1933	Knocklassa	0-07	Kilglass	0-01
1932	Ballisodare	4-08	Curry	0-02
1931	Ballisodare	3-06	Tubbercurry	0-01
1930	Tubbercurry	4-07	Kilglass	2-06
1929	Kilglass	3-03	Tubbercurry	0-03
1928	Tubbercurry	4-03	Dromore West	1-02
1927	Tubbercurry	(scores unrecorded)	Collooney Harps	
1926	Competition abandoned			
1925	Ballymote Round Towers	(awarded title)	n/a	
1924	Tubbercurry	4-01, 4-02 (R)	Gurteen	0-02, 0-00 (R)
1923	No competition			
1922	Curry	2-07	Tubbercurry	0-00
1921	No competition			
1920	Competition abandoned			
1919	Moylough	1-04	Doocastle	0-00
1918	Tubbercurry	(awarded title)	Moylough	
1917	Tubbercurry	(awarded title)	Coolera	
1916	Enniscrone	0-01, 1-03 (R)	Doocastle	0-01, 0-02 (R)
1915	Knockalassa	0-02 (won on objection)	Derroon	1-00
1914	Enniscrone	1-01 (won on objection)	Ballymote	1-02
1913	Ballymote Round Towers	1-03	Enniscrone	1-02
1912	No competition			
1911	Not completed			
1910	Sligo Wanderers	2-02	Easkey	1-02
1909	Sligo Wanderers	1-04	Gurteen	0-01
1908	No competition			
1907	Coolera	1-01	Easkey	0-02
1906	Gurteen	0-18	Sligo Celtics	0-01
1905	Ballymote Round Towers	2-05	Gurteen	0-03
1893–1904	No Championship			
1892	Ballymote Round Towers	0-03	Achonry Davitts	0-01
1891	Bunninadden	0-05	Strandhill	0-02
1890	Tubbercurry	0-05	Sooey	0-01
1889	Curry	0-04	Sooey	0-03
1888	Sligo Emmets	1-01, 3-03 (R)	Ballintogher	0-01, 0-01 (R)
