= 1993 Sligo Senior Football Championship =

Gaelic football competition in Ireland

Tournament details
- County: Sligo
- Year: 1993

Winners
- Champions: Eastern Harps (2nd win)
- Manager: Denis Johnson

Promotion/Relegation
- Promoted team(s): Ballymote
- Relegated team(s): Geevagh, Grange

This is a round-up of the 1993 Sligo Senior Football Championship. Eastern Harps won their first Championship since 1975, after defeating Tubbercurry by a point in the final. This was the beginning of a new era of domination by two clubs, as Harps and Tourlestrane would claim the majority of honours for the rest of the decade, just as Tubbercurry and St. Mary's had done in the 1980s.

== First round ==
Game	Date	Venue	Team A	Score	Team B	Score
Sligo SFC; First Round	1 August	Markievicz Park	Eastern Harps	2-6	Drumcliffe/Rosses Point	0-8
Sligo SFC; First Round	1 August	Easkey	Tourlestrane	2-8	Enniscrone	2-5
Sligo SFC; First Round	1 August	Tubbercurry	St. Mary’s	1-13	Geevagh	0-3
Sligo SFC; First Round	8 August	Markievicz Park	Tubbercurry	0-15	Castleconnor/St. Farnan’s	1-3
Sligo SFC; First Round	8 August	Markievicz Park	St. Patrick’s	0-12	Grange	0-7
Sligo SFC; First Round	8 August	Tubbercurry	Easkey	0-10	Curry	0-10
Sligo SFC; First Round	8 August	Tubbercurry	Coolera/Strandhill	2-10	St. Nathy’s	2-7
Sligo SFC; First Round Replay	15 August	Enniscrone	Easkey	2-15	Curry	1-6

== Quarter finals ==
Game	Date	Venue	Team A	Score	Team B	Score
Sligo SFC; Quarter Final	22 August	Kent Park	Tubbercurry	2-12	Coolera/Strandhill	2-6
Sligo SFC; Quarter Final	22 August	Enniscrone	Easkey	1-9	St. Mary’s	0-11
Sligo SFC; Quarter Final	22 August	Markievicz Park	Tourlestrane	4-12	St. Patrick’s	1-11
Sligo SFC; Quarter Final	22 August	Tubbercurry	Eastern Harps	1-10	Shamrock Gaels	0-9

== Semi-finals ==
Game	Date	Venue	Team A	Score	Team B	Score
Sligo SFC; Semi-Final	29 August	Markievicz Park	Eastern Harps	4-13	Easkey	1-10
Sligo SFC; Semi-Final	29 August	Markievicz Park	Tubbercurry	1-16	Tourlestrane	2-5

== Sligo Senior Football Championship Final ==
Eastern Harps	0-12 - 1-8 (final score after 60 minutes)	Tubbercurry
Team: Substitutes:	Half-time: Competition: Sligo Senior Football Championship (Final) Date: 12 September 1993 Venue: Markievicz Park, Sligo Referee:	Team: Substitutes:
