= 1997 Sligo Senior Football Championship =

Gaelic football competition

Tournament details
- County: Sligo
- Year: 1997

Winners
- Champions: Tourlestrane (5th win)
- Manager: Neil Egan
- Captain: Matthew Walsh

Promotion/Relegation
- Promoted team(s): Cloonacool, Bunninadden
- Relegated team(s): Calry/St. Joseph's, Ballymote

This is a round-up of the 1997 Sligo Senior Football Championship. Tourlestrane reclaimed the title in this year, their fifth in all, following an emphatic victory over a disappointing Eastern Harps side.

== First round ==
Game	Date	Venue	Team A	Score	Team B	Score
Sligo SFC; First Round	6 July	Ballymote	St. Mary’s	1-9	Curry	0-11
Sligo SFC; First Round	6 July	Ballymote	Shamrock Gaels	3-13	Ballymote	0-8
Sligo SFC; First Round	6 July	Easkey	Easkey	2-11	Enniscrone	1-9
Sligo SFC; First Round	6 July	Markievicz Park	Tourlestrane	2-13	Calry/St. Joseph’s	1-8

== Quarter finals ==
Game	Date	Venue	Team A	Score	Team B	Score
Sligo SFC; Quarter Final	9 August	Markievicz Park	Tourlestrane	0-10	St. Mary’s	1-3
Sligo SFC; Quarter Final	10 August	Markievicz Park	Easkey	0-11	Shamrock Gaels	0-9
Sligo SFC; Quarter Final	10 August	Markievicz Park	Eastern Harps	2-16	Coolera/Strandhill	1-4
Sligo SFC; Quarter Final	10 August	Ballymote	Tubbercurry	2-6	Drumcliffe/Rosses Point	2-6
Sligo SFC; Quarter Final Replay	24 August	Markievicz Park	Tubbercurry	0-13	Drumcliffe/Rosses Point	1-9

== Semi-finals ==
Game	Date	Venue	Team A	Score	Team B	Score
Sligo SFC; Semi-Final	7 September	Ballymote	Eastern Harps	1-14	Easkey	1-7
Sligo SFC; Semi-Final	7 September	Ballymote	Tourlestrane	1-15	Tubbercurry	1-14

== Sligo Senior Football Championship Final ==
Tourlestrane	0-16 - 0-8 (final score after 60 minutes)	Eastern Harps
Manager:Neil Egan Team: P. McVann; L. Gaughan; F. Kennedy; N. Manley; J. Curley; D. Durkin; E. Gallagher; C. O'Meara; E. O'Hara (0-1); E. Walsh; M. Walsh (0-4)(Capt); J. Egan (0-3); S. Dunne; G. McGowan (0-5); R. Kennedy (0-3) Substitutes: J. Lundy	Half-time: 0-6 - 0-2 Competition: Sligo Senior Football Championship (Final) Date: 21 September 1997 Venue: Markievicz Park, Sligo Referee: Paddy Hennessy (Owenmore Gaels)	Manager:Denis Johnson Team: P. Walsh; F. Sexton; O. Shannon; S. King; D. Ballantyne (Capt); D. Mullaney; M. Cosgrove; M. McCormack (0-1); J. Chambers (0-1); K. Carty (0-1); P. Taylor (0-4); E. Molloy; J. Bruen; S. Dorrian; B. Phillips (0-1) Substitutes: P.J. Langton; N. Molloy
