= 1964 Sligo Senior Football Championship =

Gaelic football competition

Sligo Senior Football Championship 1964
Tournament details
- County: Sligo
- Year: 1964

Winners
- Champions: Curry (3rd win)

Promotion/Relegation
- Promoted team(s): n/a
- Relegated team(s): n/a

This is a round-up of the 1964 Sligo Senior Football Championship. The holders and four-in-a-row champions Ballisodare/St. Patrick's, dubbed as the "Pride of the West", were dethroned after a semi-final replay, with Keash the victors. They in turn fell to Curry in the final, thus ending a 42-year wait for the South Sligo club's third title.

== First round ==
Game	Date	Venue	Team A	Score	Team B	Score
Sligo SFC; First Round	12 July	Tubbercurry	Curry	1-6	Bunninadden	1-5
Sligo SFC; First Round	12 July	Markievicz Park	Ballisodare/St. Patrick’s	2-11	Sooey	0-5
Sligo SFC; First Round	12 July	Ballymote	Collooney Harps	6-5	Tourlestrane	0-7
Sligo SFC; First Round	12 July	Ballymote	Easkey	2-9	Tubbercurry	0-6

== Quarter-finals ==
Game	Date	Venue	Team A	Score	Team B	Score
Sligo SFC; Quarter-final	2 August	Tubbercurry	Collooney Harps	0-12	Easkey	1-6
Sligo SFC; Quarter-final	9 August	Ballymote	Ballisodare/St. Patrick’s	2-9	Ballymote	0-6
Sligo SFC; Quarter-final	9 August	Ballymote	Keash	0-16	St. Joseph’s (Cliffoney)	0-5
Sligo SFC; Quarter-final	16 August	Tubbercurry	Curry	2-6	Craobh Rua	3-0

== Semi-finals ==
Game	Date	Venue	Team A	Score	Team B	Score
Sligo SFC; Semi-final	16 August	Ballymote	Keash	3-5	Ballisodare/St. Patrick’s	0-14
Sligo SFC; Semi-final	23 August	Tubbercurry	Curry	2-6	Collooney Harps	1-6
Sligo SFC; Semi-final Replay	23 August	Tubbercurry	Keash	3-7	Ballisodare/St. Patrick’s	2-4

== Sligo Senior Football Championship Final ==
Curry	1-14 - 2-5 (final score after 60 minutes)	Keash
Team: N. Collins; M. Gildea; P.J. Doohan; O. Doyle; M. Parsons; T. Gilmartin; J. Durkin; P. Keane; S. Gilmartin; O. Henry; S. Durkin; P. Brennan; P. Duffy; C. Keane; T. Duffy Substitutes:	Half-time: Competition: Sligo Senior Football Championship (Final) Date: 6 September 1964 Venue: Kilcoyne Park, Tubbercurry Referee:	Team: J. Benson; T. Convey; P. Keaney; K. Cryan; S. Carty; P. Hannon; R. McCormack; T. Joyce; B. Tansey; O. Tansey; S. Fox; J. Greer; M. Farrell; A. McDonagh; P. Tansey Substitutes:
