= 1983 Sligo Senior Football Championship =

Gaelic football competition

Tournament details
- County: Sligo
- Year: 1983

Winners
- Champions: St. Mary's (5th win)

Promotion/Relegation
- Promoted team(s): Eastern Harps
- Relegated team(s): Easkey

This is a round-up of the 1983 Sligo Senior Football Championship. St. Mary's were champions again, regaining the title they had lost to Tourlestrane the previous year. Any hopes of the Sligo town club being kept off the top spot were dashed after they gained an emphatic revenge on holders Tourlestrane in the opening round, and enjoyed a comfortable win over Tubbercurry in the final. This was the first of five successive final meetings between the two clubs.

== Quarter finals ==
Game	Date	Venue	Team A	Score	Team B	Score
Sligo SFC; Quarter Final	7 August	Ballymote	Curry	2-9	St. Patrick’s	1-6
Sligo SFC; Quarter Final	7 August	Ballymote	Coolera	4-8	Easkey	1-6
Sligo SFC; Quarter Final	7 August	Easkey	Tubbercurry	4-11	Grange	1-7
Sligo SFC; Quarter Final	7 August	Easkey	St. Mary’s	3-13	Tourlestrane	0-4

== Semi-finals ==
Game	Date	Venue	Team A	Score	Team B	Score
Sligo SFC; Semi-Final	28 August	Ballymote	St. Mary’s	1-11	Curry	0-5
Sligo SFC; Semi-Final	28 August	Ballymote	Tubbercurry	4-14	Coolera	1-4

== Sligo Senior Football Championship Final ==
St. Mary's	2-9 - 1-5 (final score after 60 minutes)	Tubbercurry
Team: G. Young; T. Foley; H. Gilvarry; J. McGowan; T. Carroll; G. Finan; M. Laffey; B. Jones; John Kent; D. McGoldrick; J. Crehan; R. Henneberry; K. O'Keeffe; Jim Kent; J. Bird Substitutes: C. Garvey	Half-time: Competition: Sligo Senior Football Championship (Final) Date: 11 September 1983 Venue: Corran Park, Ballymote Referee: Edward Neary (St. Patrick's)	Team: B. Murphy; L. Gilmartin; G. Gilmartin; J. Stenson; O. Wynne; P. Gilmartin; P. McCarrick; E. Gilmartin; J. Murphy; P. Regan; J.J. Gorham; W. Murphy; T. Killoran; N. Killoran; R. McCarrick Substitutes:
