= 1992 Sligo Senior Football Championship =

Gaelic football competition

Tournament details
- County: Sligo
- Year: 1992

Winners
- Champions: Shamrock Gaels (2nd win)
- Manager: Vincent Henry
- Captain: Noel Willis

Promotion/Relegation
- Promoted team(s): Drumcliffe/Rosses Point
- Relegated team(s): n/a

This is a round-up of the 1992 Sligo Senior Football Championship. Shamrock Gaels won their second title in three years, and last to date, after defeating St. Patrick's Dromard in the final, in their last final appearance to date. The Tireragh men would be relegated from Division 1 this year, along with Enniscrone, but both remained in the Championship for 1993. The first round tie between Curry and Enniscrone required two replays and one period of extra-time before Curry eventually emerged by a single point.

== First round ==
| Game | Date | Venue | Team A | Score | Team B | Score |
|---|---|---|---|---|---|---|
| Sligo SFC; First Round | 12 July | Dromard | Easkey | 0-10 | St. Mary's | 1-4 |
| Sligo SFC; First Round | 19 July | Tubbercurry | Tourlestrane | 1-7 | Tubbercurry | 0-8 |
| Sligo SFC; First Round | 19 July | Tubbercurry | Curry | 0-10 | Enniscrone | 1-7 |
| Sligo SFC; First Round | 19 July | Markievicz Park | Shamrock Gaels | 0-14 | St. Nathy’s | 1-4 |
| Sligo SFC; First Round | 19 July | Markievicz Park | Coolera/Strandhill | 0-13 | Grange/Cliffoney/Maugherow | 1-3 |
| Sligo SFC; First Round Replay | 2 August | Tubbercurry | Curry | 1-12 | Enniscrone | 0-15 |
| Sligo SFC; First Round Second Replay (AET) | 9 August | Dromard | Curry | 0-15 | Enniscrone | 0-14 |

== Quarter finals ==
| Game | Date | Venue | Team A | Score | Team B | Score |
|---|---|---|---|---|---|---|
| Sligo SFC; Quarter Final | 2 August | Kent Park | Shamrock Gaels | 2-9 | Eastern Harps | 1-8 |
| Sligo SFC; Quarter Final | 2 August | Kent Park | St. Patrick’s | 2-6 | Geevagh | 1-8 |
| Sligo SFC; Quarter Final | 2 August | Dromard | Coolera/Strandhill | 2-5 | Easkey | 0-9 |
| Sligo SFC; Quarter Final | 15 August | Tubbercurry | Curry | 0-11 | Tourlestrane | 1-6 |

== Semi-finals ==
| Game | Date | Venue | Team A | Score | Team B | Score |
|---|---|---|---|---|---|---|
| Sligo SFC; Semi-Final | 30 August | Kent Park | St. Patrick’s | 0-7 | Coolera/Strandhill | 0-6 |
| Sligo SFC; Semi-Final | 30 August | Kent Park | Shamrock Gaels | 2-8 | Curry | 1-5 |

== Sligo Senior Football Championship Final ==
| Shamrock Gaels | 2-11 - 0-8 (final score after 60 minutes) | St. Patrick's |
| Team: Substitutes: | Half-time: Competition: Sligo Senior Football Championship (Final) Date: 13 September 1992 Venue: Markievicz Park, Sligo Referee: | Team: Substitutes: |
