= 2008 Sligo Senior Football Championship =

Gaelic football competition

Tournament details
- County: Sligo
- Year: 2008

Winners
- Champions: Eastern Harps (6th win)
- Manager: Denis Johnson
- Captain: Ross Donovan

Promotion/Relegation
- Promoted team(s): St.Molaise Gaels
- Relegated team(s): Bunninadden, Drumcliffe/Rosses Point, Geevagh

This is a round-up of the 2008 Sligo Senior Football Championship. Eastern Harps were crowned champions for the sixth time in their history, after a convincing defeat of Tubbercurry in the decider. The reigning champions, Tourlestrane, surrendered the title after failing to emerge from their group, and the once-dominant town outfit, St. Mary's, were forced to survive a playoff to retain their senior status. The 2000 champions Bunninadden were not so fortunate however, and were relegated to Intermediate level, just two years after last contesting the final.

== Group stages ==
The Championship was contested by 16 teams, divided into four groups. The top two sides in each group advanced to the quarter-finals, with the bottom sides in each group facing the Relegation playoffs to retain Senior status for 2009, as the restructuring of the Championships got under way.

=== Group A ===
Date	Venue	Team A	Score	Team B	Score
31 May	Enniscrone	Coolera/Strandhill	1-13	Bunninadden	1-8
31 May	Enniscrone	Eastern Harps	1-15	Easkey	0-9
7 June	Markievicz Park	Eastern Harps	2-21	Bunninadden	1-4
7 June	Ballymote	Coolera/Strandhill	0-14	Easkey	1-6
9 August	Markeivicz Park	Eastern Harps	1-10	Coolera/Strandhill	1-7
10 August	Tubbercurry	Easkey	0-8	Bunninadden	0-7

Team	Pld	W	D	L	For	Against	Pts
Eastern Harps	3	3	0	0	4-46	2-20	6
Coolera/Strandhill	3	2	0	1	2-34	3-24	4
Easkey	3	1	0	2	1-23	1-37	2
Bunninadden	3	0	0	3	2-19	3-42	0

=== Group B ===
Date	Venue	Team A	Score	Team B	Score
31 May	Ballymote	Calry/St. Joseph's	3-8	Tubbercurry	2-11
31 May	Ballymote	Curry	0-11	St. Mary's	0-10
7 June	Markievicz Park	Curry	1-9	Tubbercurry	0-7
7 June	Tubbercurry	St. Mary's	1-13	Calry/St. Joseph's	1-8
10 August	Ennisrone	Tubbercurry	1-6	St. Mary's	0-6
10 August	Ballymote	Calry/St. Joseph's	1-8	Curry	0-9

Team	Pld	W	D	L	For	Against	Pts
Curry	3	2	0	1	1-29	1-25	4
Tubbercurry	3	1	1	1	3-24	3-21	3
Calry/St. Joseph's	3	1	1	1	5-24	3-33	3
St. Mary's	3	1	0	2	1-29	2-25	2

=== Group C ===
Date	Venue	Team A	Score	Team B	Score
31 May	Markievicz Park	Castleconnor	1-12	Drumcliffe/Rosses Point	1-5
1 June	Markievicz Park	St. Farnan's	2-8	St. John's	0-13
7 June	Enniscrone	Castleconnor	0-12	St. John's	0-9
7 June	Enniscrone	St. Farnan's	0-12	Drumcliffe/Rosses Point	2-3
9 August	Kent Park	St. John's	0-13	Drumcliffe/Rosses Point	1-3
9 August	Ennicrone	Castleconnor	1-7	St. Farnan's	1-7

Team	Pld	W	D	L	For	Against	Pts
Castleconnor	3	2	1	0	2-31	2-21	5
St. Farnan's	3	2	1	0	3-27	3-23	5
St. John's	3	1	0	2	0-35	3-23	2
Drumcliffe/Rosses Point	3	0	0	3	4-11	1-37	0

=== Group D ===
Date	Venue	Team A	Score	Team B	Score
31 May	Tubbercurry	Ballymote	0-10	Tourlestrane	1-7
31 May	Tubbercurry	Shamrock Gaels	2-8	Geevagh	1-7
7 June	Ballymote	Shamrock Gaels	1-13	Tourlestrane	1-11
7 June	Tourlestrane	Ballymote	2-10	Geevagh	0-14
9 August	Tubbercurry	Ballymote	2-9	Shamrock Gaels	0-9
9 August	Markievicz Park	Tourlestrane	1-13	Geevagh	1-12

Team	Pld	W	D	L	For	Against	Pts
Ballymote	3	2	1	0	4-29	1-30	5
Shamrock Gaels	3	2	0	1	3-30	4-27	4
Tourlestrane	3	1	1	1	3-31	2-35	3
Geevagh	3	0	0	3	2-33	5-31	0

== Quarterfinals ==
Game	Date	Venue	Team A	Score	Team B	Score
Sligo SFC; Quarter Final	30 August	Markievicz Park	Eastern Harps	2-19	St. Farnan's	0-2
Sligo SFC; Quarter Final	30 August	Enniscrone	Coolera/Strandhill	1-8	Castleconnor	0-6
Sligo SFC; Quarter Final	30 August	Markievicz Park	Curry	0-13	Shamrock Gaels	0-10
Sligo SFC; Quarter Final	30 August	Enniscrone	Tubbercurry	1-14	Ballymote	1-13

== Semifinals ==
Game	Date	Venue	Team A	Score	Team B	Score
Sligo SFC; Semi-Final	13 September	Markievicz Park	Eastern Harps	0-10	Curry	0-10
Sligo SFC; Semi-Final	20 September	Markievicz Park	Tubbercurry	0-11	Coolera/Strandhill	0-11
Sligo SFC; Semi-Final Replay	20 September	Tourlestrane	Eastern Harps	1-13	Curry	2-9
Sligo SFC; Semi-Final Replay	28 September	Tourlestrane	Tubbercurry	1-14	Coolera/Strandhill	1-11

== Last eight ==
Quarterfinals; 30 August
Eastern Harps	2-19
St. Farnan's	0-2
Curry	0-13
Shamrock Gaels	0-10
Coolera/Strandhill	1-8
Castleconnor	0-6
Tubbercurry	1-14
Ballymote	1-13

Semifinals; 13/20 September/28
Eastern Harps	0-10, 1-13 (R)
Curry	0-10, 2-9 (R)
Coolera/Strandhill	0-11, 1-11 (R)
Tubbercurry	0-11, 1-14 (R)

Final; 5 October
Eastern Harps	1-16
Tubbercurry	1-8

== Sligo Senior Football Championship Final ==
Eastern Harps	1-16 - 1-8 (final score after 60 minutes)	Tubbercurry
Manager:Denis Johnson Team: Substitutes:	Half-time: 1-5 - 0-6 Competition: Sligo Senior Football Championship (Final) Date: Sunday, 5 October 2008 Venue: Markievicz Park, Sligo Referee: T.J. Keaveney (St. Patrick's, Dromard)	Manager:Reggie McNulty Team: Substitutes:

== Relegation ==
Game	Date	Venue	Team A	Score	Team B	Score
Sligo SFC; Relegation Playoff	23 August	Kent Park	Geevagh	1-13	Drumcliffe/Rosses Point	1-6
Sligo SFC; Relegation Playoff	23 August	Tourlestrane	St. Mary's	0-11	Bunninadden	1-8
Sligo SFC; Relegation Playoff Replay	31 August	Tubbercurry	St. Mary's	0-16	Bunninadden	1-3
Sligo SFC; Relegation Playoff Final	20 September	Enniscrone	St. Mary's	2-13	Geevagh	0-10
