= 1994 Sligo Senior Football Championship =

Gaelic football competition

Tournament details
- County: Sligo
- Year: 1994

Winners
- Champions: Tourlestrane (4th win)
- Manager: Neil Egan
- Captain: Padraig McVann

Promotion/Relegation
- Promoted team(s): Grange/Cliffoney, Bunninadden, Castleconnor
- Relegated team(s): Coolera/Strandhill, Enniscrone, Ballymote

This is a round-up of the 1994 Sligo Senior Football Championship. Tourlestrane were champions for the first time in twelve years, after defeating Shamrock Gaels in the final. This was the last year that amalgamations competed in the Championship, St. Nathy's and Geevagh/St. Michael's exiting early, though Bunninadden's promotion to Senior level meant the end of the former alliance in any event. Ballymote returned to the Championship after a 27-year gap, but didn't enjoy much success.

== First round ==
Game	Date	Venue	Team A	Score	Team B	Score
Sligo SFC; First Round	17 July	Markievicz Park	Ballymote	0-10	Drumcliffe/Rosses Point	1-6
Sligo SFC; First Round	17 July	Ballymote	Coolera/Strandhill	1-9	St. Patrick’s	0-8
Sligo SFC; First Round	17 July	Tubbercurry	Eastern Harps	3-12	Easkey	0-7
Sligo SFC; First Round	31 July	Markievicz Park	Curry	0-14	Geevagh/St. Michael’s	0-7
Sligo SFC; First Round	31 July	Markievicz Park	St. Mary’s	0-15	St. Nathy’s	0-11
Sligo SFC; First Round	31 July	Tubbercurry	Tourlestrane	6-14	Enniscrone	1-3

== Quarter finals ==
Game	Date	Venue	Team A	Score	Team B	Score
Sligo SFC; Quarter Final	14 August	Ballymote	Shamrock Gaels	1-13	Curry	0-12
Sligo SFC; Quarter Final	14 August	Ballymote	Tubbercurry	0-14	Eastern Harps	0-9
Sligo SFC; Quarter Final	14 August	Tubbercurry	Coolera/Strandhill	2-12	Ballymote	2-9
Sligo SFC; Quarter Final	14 August	Tubbercurry	Tourlestrane	0-10	St. Mary’s	0-9

== Semi-finals ==
Game	Date	Venue	Team A	Score	Team B	Score
Sligo SFC; Semi-Final	28 August	Markievicz Park	Shamrock Gaels	1-14	Coolera/Strandhill	1-5
Sligo SFC; Semi-Final	28 August	Markievicz Park	Tourlestrane	1-9	Tubbercurry	0-10

== Sligo Senior Football Championship Final ==
Tourlestrane	2-7 - 0-8 (final score after 60 minutes)	Shamrock Gaels
Manager:Neil Egan Team: P. McVann (Capt); L. Gaughan; P. Durcan; N. Manley; D. Durkin; B. Walsh; A. Walsh; M. Walsh (0-1); E. O'Hara (1-0); T. Normanly; F. Kennedy (1-1); J. Lundy; A. Brennan (0-3); T. Carty (0-2); G. McGowan Substitutes: D. Curran; P. Henry	Half-time: Competition: Sligo Senior Football Championship (Final) Date: 11 September 1994 Venue: Markievicz Park, Sligo Referee: John Lee (Calry/St. Joseph's)	Manager:Vincent Henry Team: J. Kearns; J. Conlon; G. McDermott; S. Potter; M. Conlon; P. White; J. Lyons; G. Ballantyne; J. White; C. Kearns (0-3); M. Kenny; T. Deignan; D. Ryan (0-3); E. Deignan (Capt)(0-2); R. Ballantyne Substitutes: N. Willis
