= 1969 Sligo Senior Football Championship =

Gaelic football competition

Sligo Senior Football Championship 1969
Tournament details
- County: Sligo
- Year: 1969

Winners
- Champions: Collooney/Ballisodare (2nd win)

Promotion/Relegation
- Promoted team(s): n/a
- Relegated team(s): n/a

This is a round-up of the 1969 Sligo Senior Football Championship. Collooney/Ballisodare were champions again, and as in 1967 they defeated the holders, this time St. Patrick's, in the final. This was the seventh title won by the parish in the 1960s, but this was also to be the last such triumph to date.

== First round ==
Game	Date	Venue	Team A	Score	Team B	Score
Sligo SFC; First Round	10 August	Ballymote	Muire Naofa	4-4	Curry	0-10
Sligo SFC; First Round	10 August	Ballymote	Gurteen/Bunninadden	2-9	Sooey/Knockalassa	2-6
Sligo SFC; First Round	10 August	Markievicz Park	Easkey	4-7	Enniscrone	2-8
Sligo SFC; First Round	17 August	Tubbercurry	St. Patrick’s	0-12	Craobh Rua	1-7

== Quarter-finals ==
Game	Date	Venue	Team A	Score	Team B	Score
Sligo SFC; Quarter-final	10 August	Tubbercurry	Mullinabreena	4-4	Tourlestrane	0-9
Sligo SFC; Quarter-final	17 August	Tubbercurry	Collooney/Ballisodare	5-4	Tubbercurry	4-4
Sligo SFC; Quarter-final	31 August	Markievicz Park	St. Patrick’s	0-11	Easkey	1-6
Sligo SFC; Quarter-final	31 August	Markievicz Park	Gurteen/Bunninadden	1-10	Muire Naofa	2-5

== Semi-finals ==
Game	Date	Venue	Team A	Score	Team B	Score
Sligo SFC; Semi-final	7 September	Markievicz Park	Collooney/Ballisodare	1-10	Mullinabreena	2-4
Sligo SFC; Semi-final	7 September	Markievicz Park	St. Patrick’s	4-7	Gurteen/Bunninadden	0-5

== Sligo Senior Football Championship Final ==
Collooney/Ballisodare	1-9 - 2-5 (final score after 60 minutes)	St. Patrick's
Team: T. Weir; T. McLoughlin; M. Molloy; P. Hennessy; A. Flynn; S. Henry; B. McAuley; T. Sheehan; P. Hannon; D. Martin; G. Horgan; J. Hannon; R. Henry; B. Finn; M. Flynn Substitutes:	Half-time: Competition: Sligo Senior Football Championship (Final) Date: 21 September 1969 Venue: Corran Park, Ballymote Referee:	Team: T. Cummins; F. Leonard; A. Boland; P.J. Kilcullen; S. Donegan; J. Cuffe; J. Kilgallon; R. Boland; M. Kearins; P. McMunn; K. Corcoran; P. Kearins; T. Leonard; P. Kilgallon; D. O'Connor Substitutes:
