= 1987 Sligo Senior Football Championship =

Gaelic football competition

Tournament details
- County: Sligo
- Year: 1987

Winners
- Champions: St. Mary's (8th win)

Promotion/Relegation
- Promoted team(s): Easkey
- Relegated team(s): Tourlestrane

This is a round-up of the 1987 Sligo Senior Football Championship. St. Mary's won their eighth title in eleven attempts, after defeating holders Tubbercurry in the fifth successive final between the sides. This year's Championship saw the return of the group stages used from 1974 to 1977, but its return was short-lived.

== Group stages ==
The Championship was contested by 14 teams, divided into four groups. The top side in each group qualified for the semi-finals.

=== Group 1 ===
Date	Venue	Team A	Score	Team B	Score
28 June	Ballymote	Tubbercurry	4–12	Calry/St. Michael's	1–2
28 June	Tubbercurry	Curry	2–7	Owenmore Gaels/Ballymote	0–6
5 July	Ballymote	Tubbercurry	2–10	Curry	0–7
5 July	Markievicz Park	Calry/St. Michael's	beat	Owenmore Gaels/Ballymote	(2 pts)
19 July	Ballymote	Tubbercurry	3–13	Owenmore Gaels/Ballymote	0–6
19 July	Tubbercurry	Curry	beat	Calry/St. Michael's	(no score)

Team	Pld	W	D	L	For	Against	Pts
Tubbercurry	3	3	0	0	9-35	1-14	6
Curry	3	2	0	1	-	-	4
Calry/St. Michael's	3	1	0	2	-	-	2
Owenmore Gaels/Ballymote	3	0	0	3	-	-	0

=== Group 2 ===
Date	Venue	Team A	Score	Team B	Score
28 June	Ballymote	Eastern Harps	1–14	Shamrock Gaels	1–3
28 June	Markievicz Park	Geevagh	1–8	Grange/Maugherow	0–7
5 July	Ballymote	Geevagh	0–8	Shamrock Gaels	0–6
5 July	Markievicz Park	Grange/Maugherow	2–10	Eastern Harps	1–7
19 July	Ballymote	Eastern Harps	2–8	Geevagh	2–3
19 July	Markievicz Park	Grange/Maugherow	2–13	Shamrock Gaels	3–9

Team	Pld	W	D	L	For	Against	Pts
Eastern Harps	3	2	0	1	4-29	5-16	4
Grange/Maugherow	3	2	0	1	4-30	5-24	4
Geevagh	3	2	0	1	3-19	2-21	4
Shamrock Gaels	3	0	0	3	4-18	3-35	0

=== Group 3 ===
Date	Venue	Team A	Score	Team B	Score
28 June	Enniscrone	St. Mary's	2–9	Easkey/St. Farnan's	0–4
5 July	Easkey	St. Mary's	2–9	Tourlestrane	0–4
19 July	Tubbercurry	Tourlestrane	--	Easkey/St. Farnan's	--

Team	Pld	W	D	L	For	Against	Pts
St. Mary's	2	2	0	0	4-18	0-8	4
Easkey/St. Farnan's	1	0	0	1	0-4	2-9	1
Tourlestrane	1	0	0	1	0-4	2-9	1

=== Group 4 ===
Date	Venue	Team A	Score	Team B	Score
28 June	Tubbercurry	St. Nathy's	0–9	Enniscrone/Castleconnor	1–6
5 July	Easkey	St. Patrick's	1–11	Enniscrone/Castleconnor	2–3
19 July	Markievicz Park	St. Nathy's	0–11	St. Patrick's	0–9

Team	Pld	W	D	L	For	Against	Pts
St. Nathy's	2	1	1	0	0-20	1-15	3
St. Patrick's	2	1	0	1	1-20	2-14	2
Enniscrone/Castleconnor	2	0	1	1	3-9	1-20	1

== Playoff ==
There was a three-way playoff required in Group 3. Geevagh defeated Grange/Maugherow in the first tie, but Eastern Harps won the final playoff to claim the last semi-final spot.

Game	Date	Venue	Team A	Score	Team B	Score
Sligo SFC; Playoff	26 July	Ballymote	Geevagh	1–7	Grange/Maugherow	2–1
Sligo SFC; Playoff	2 August	Ballymote	Eastern Harps	beat	Geevagh	(no score)

== Semi-finals ==
Game	Date	Venue	Team A	Score	Team B	Score
Sligo SFC; Semi-Final	9 August	Ballymote	St. Mary's	1–12	Eastern Harps	1–7
Sligo SFC; Semi-Final	9 August	Ballymote	Tubbercurry	1–10	St. Nathy's	0–9

== Sligo Senior Football Championship Final ==
St. Mary's	1-7 - 1-6 (final score after 60 minutes)	Tubbercurry
Manager: Team: Substitutes:	Half-time: Competition: Sligo Senior Football Championship (Final) Date: 15.30 BST; Sunday, 30 August 1987 Venue: Enniscrone Referee: Match rules: 60 minutes. Replay if scores still level. Maximum of 5 substitutions.	Manager: Team: Substitutes:
