= 1966 Sligo Senior Football Championship =

Gaelic football competition

Sligo Senior Football Championship 1966
Tournament details
- County: Sligo
- Year: 1966

Winners
- Champions: Easkey (5th win)

Promotion/Relegation
- Promoted team(s): n/a
- Relegated team(s): n/a

This is a round-up of the 1966 Sligo Senior Football Championship. Easkey, one of the traditional strongholds of Sligo football, claimed their fifth title, after a gap of 25 years, when overpowering the challenge of Ballymote in the final. The final had two 'lasts' to its outcome - Easkey's last title and Ballymote's last final appearance to date.

== First round ==
Game	Date	Venue	Team A	Score	Team B	Score
Sligo SFC; First Round	7 August	Tubbercurry	Ballymote	2-7	Tourlestrane	0-6

== Quarter-finals ==
Game	Date	Venue	Team A	Score	Team B	Score
Sligo SFC; Quarter-final	14 August	Ballymote	Curry	beat	Collooney Harps	(no score)
Sligo SFC; Quarter-final	14 August	Ballymote	Easkey	beat	St. Patrick's	(no score)
Sligo SFC; Quarter-final	14 August	Markievicz Park	Ballymote	beat	Craobh Rua	(no score)
Sligo SFC; Quarter-final	14 August	Tubbercurry	Bunninadden	4-5	Tubbercurry	3-5

== Semi-finals ==
Game	Date	Venue	Team A	Score	Team B	Score
Sligo SFC; Semi-final	21 August	Ballymote	Easkey	beat	Curry	(no score)
Sligo SFC; Semi-final	28 August	Ballymote	Ballymote	4-10	Bunninadden	0-5

== Sligo Senior Football Championship Final ==
Easkey	1-8 - 0-2 (final score after 60 minutes)	Ballymote
Team: P. Brady; M. Keaveney; R. Tully; S. Weir; T.J. Lyons; J.P. McGuire; V. Cuffe; E. Mullen; F. Lyons; P.J. Sloyane; M. Rooney; M. McHugh; G. Ferguson; S. Calleary; M. Kenny Substitutes: S. Rolston	Half-time: Competition: Sligo Senior Football Championship (Final) Date: 11 September 1966 Venue: Markievicz Park, Sligo Referee:	Team: P. Mullen; E. Hannon; E. McGinley; P. McGrath; J. Mattimoe; B. Doherty; S. Keevans; S. Davey; M. Henry; A. Killoran; N. Farry; A. Mullen; L. Keevans; P. Dockry; M. Healy Substitutes: N. Clarke
