= 1985 Sligo Senior Football Championship =

Gaelic football competition

Tournament details
- County: Sligo
- Year: 1985

Winners
- Champions: St. Mary's (7th win)
- Captain: John Kent

Promotion/Relegation
- Promoted team(s): Shamrock Gaels
- Relegated team(s): Geevagh

This is a round-up of the 1985 Sligo Senior Football Championship. St. Mary's completed their second hat-trick of titles in a seven-year period in this year, and once again Tubbercurry were the beaten finalists. This year's final was unique, as it required three games to decide the issue, and the latter game proved to be a bad-tempered affair, with four Tubbercurry players sent off in the closing minutes. This year's Championship also saw the entry of numerous amalgamations, as the Championship was opened up to Intermediate and Junior clubs to enter their combined resources, but this couldn't prevent a repeat of the outcome of previous years.

== First round ==
Game	Date	Venue	Team A	Score	Team B	Score
Sligo SFC; First Round	7 July	Ballymote	Eastern Harps	2–10	Mullinabreena/Cloonacool	1-1
Sligo SFC; First Round	7 July	Ballymote	Tubbercurry	2–7	Tourlestrane	1–7
Sligo SFC; First Round	7 July	Markievicz Park	St. Patrick's	1–17	Drumcliffe/Maugherow	0–1
Sligo SFC; First Round	7 July	Tubbercurry	Enniscrone/Castleconnor	1–9	Ballymote/Shamrock Gaels	0–3
Sligo SFC; First Round	7 July	Dromard	Grange/Northern Gaels	2–8	Curry	1–4
Sligo SFC; First Round	7 July	Dromard	Easkey/St. Farnan's	1–8	Owenmore Gaels/St. Michael's	0–4

== Quarter finals ==
Game	Date	Venue	Team A	Score	Team B	Score
Sligo SFC; Quarter Final	21 July	Markievicz Park	St. Mary's	2–16	Grange/Northern Gaels	0–5
Sligo SFC; Quarter Final	21 July	Tubbercurry	Eastern Harps	0–9	St. Patrick's	1–4
Sligo SFC; Quarter Final	21 July	Tubbercurry	Easkey/St. Farnan's	1–7	Enniscrone/Castleconnor	0–7
Sligo SFC; Quarter Final	21 July	Ballymote	Tubbercurry	2–8	Geevagh	1–5

== Semi-finals ==
Game	Date	Venue	Team A	Score	Team B	Score
Sligo SFC; Semi-Final	4 August	Dromard	St. Mary's	1–7	Easkey/St. Farnan's	1–5
Sligo SFC; Semi-Final	4 August	Ballymote	Tubbercurry	1–4	Eastern Harps	0–5

== Championship final ==
St. Mary's	0-9 - 0-9 (final score after 60 minutes)	Tubbercurry
Team: Substitutes:	Half-time: Competition: Sligo Senior Football Championship (Final) Date: 25 August 1985 Venue: Kilcoyne Park, Tubbercurry Referee:	Team: Substitutes:

=== Final replay ===
St. Mary's	0-8 - 2-2 (final score after 60 minutes)	Tubbercurry
Team: Substitutes:	Half-time: Competition: Sligo Senior Football Championship (Final) Date: 1 September 1985 Venue: Corran Park, Ballymote Referee:	Team: Substitutes:

=== Final second replay ===
St. Mary's	1-8 - 1-3 (final score after 60 minutes)	Tubbercurry
Team: Substitutes:	Half-time: Competition: Sligo Senior Football Championship (Final) Date: 3 November 1985 Venue: Kilcoyne Park, Tubbercurry Referee: Micheal Kearins (St. Patrick's)	Team: Substitutes:
