= 1981 Sligo Senior Football Championship =

Gaelic football competition

Sligo Senior Football Championship 1981
Tournament details
- County: Sligo
- Year: 1981

Winners
- Champions: St. Mary's (4th win)

Promotion/Relegation
- Promoted team(s): Grange
- Relegated team(s): Eastern Harps

This is a round-up of the 1981 Sligo Senior Football Championship. St. Mary's completed the three-in-a-row in the repeat of the 1980 final, albeit with a smaller winning margin. Eastern Harps would be relegated from Senior football this year, after a poor league campaign, despite successive Championship final appearances. St. Mary's later won their second Connacht title, following on this Championship win.

== Quarter finals ==
Game	Date	Venue	Team A	Score	Team B	Score
Sligo SFC; Quarter Final	19 July	Ballymote	St. Mary's	4-6	Tubbercurry	1-9
Sligo SFC; Quarter Final	19 July	Markievicz Park	Tourlestrane	1-7	St. Patrick's	1-3
Sligo SFC; Quarter Final	19 July	Tubbercurry	Eastern Harps	beat	Shamrock Gaels	(10 pts.)
Sligo SFC; Quarter Final	9 August	Ballymote	Curry	1-6	Coolera	1-4

== Semi-finals ==
Game	Date	Venue	Team A	Score	Team B	Score
Sligo SFC; Semi-Final	2 August	Ballymote	Eastern Harps	0-6	Tourlestrane	0-2
Sligo SFC; Semi-Final	16 August	Ballymote	St. Mary's	3-9	Curry	1-7

== Sligo Senior Football Championship Final ==
St. Mary's	2-9 - 0-4 (final score after 60 minutes)	Eastern Harps
Team: J. Kelly; T. Carroll; J. McNamara; K. Delaney; C. O'Donnell; M. Barrett; J. McGowan; M. Laffey; G. Monaghan; E. McHale; B. Murphy; John Kent; Jim Kent; K. O'Keeffe; R. Henneberry Substitutes:	Half-time: Competition: Sligo Senior Football Championship (Final) Date: 30 August 1981 Venue: Corran Park, Ballymote Referee:	Team: J. Casey; R. Clarke; D. O'Hara; D. Garvin; S. Gallagher; F. Casey; M. Reid; E. Clarke; R. Taylor; R. Tansey; D. Johnson; C. Bruen; D. Doherty; P. Molloy; J. Higgins Substitutes:
