= 1989 Sligo Senior Football Championship =

Gaelic football competition

Tournament details
- County: Sligo
- Year: 1989

Winners
- Champions: St. Patrick's, Dromard (7th win)
- Manager: James Kearins

Promotion/Relegation
- Promoted team(s): Coolera/Strandhill
- Relegated team(s): n/a

This is a round-up of the 1989 Sligo Senior Football Championship. St. Patrick's, Dromard retained the title, their seventh and last to date, after repeating the previous year's final's outcome - a one-point defeat of Tubbercurry. Geevagh and Innisfree Gaels, an amalgamation of St. Michael's and Calry, reached the semi-finals, the only time either side managed this feat.

== First round ==
Game	Date	Venue	Team A	Score	Team B	Score
Sligo SFC; First Round	16 July	Ballymote	Shamrock Gaels	2-5	Eastern Harps	2-3
Sligo SFC; First Round	16 July	Ballymote	Tubbercurry	1-10	St. Nathy’s	2-5
Sligo SFC; First Round	16 July	Enniscrone	St. Patrick’s	1-6	St. Mary’s	0-8
Sligo SFC; First Round	16 July	Tubbercurry	Geevagh	2-11	Castleconnor/Enniscrone	1-7
Sligo SFC; First Round	16 July	Tubbercurry	Grange/Cliffoney/Maugherow	2-10	Easkey/St. Farnan’s	1-11

== Quarter finals ==
Game	Date	Venue	Team A	Score	Team B	Score
Sligo SFC; Quarter Final	6 August	Enniscrone	St. Patrick’s	0-10	Tourlestrane	0-6
Sligo SFC; Quarter Final	6 August	Tubbercurry	Innisfree Gaels	0-12	Grange/Cliffoney/Maugherow	1-8
Sligo SFC; Quarter Final	6 August	Ballymote	Geevagh	0-4	Curry	0-4
Sligo SFC; Quarter Final	6 August	Ballymote	Tubbercurry	4-8	Shamrock Gaels	1-4
Sligo SFC; Quarter Final Replay	20 August	Ballymote	Geevagh	0-9	Curry	0-8

== Semi-finals ==
Game	Date	Venue	Team A	Score	Team B	Score
Sligo SFC; Semi-Final	27 August	Enniscrone	Tubbercurry	2-6	Innisfree Gaels	0-3
Sligo SFC; Semi-Final	27 August	Enniscrone	St. Patrick’s	1-10	Geevagh	0-9

== Sligo Senior Football Championship Final ==
St. Patrick's	0-11 - 0-10 (final score after 60 minutes)	Tubbercurry
Team: Substitutes:	Half-time: Competition: Sligo Senior Football Championship (Final) Date: 10 September 1989 Venue: Corran Park, Ballymote Referee:	Team: Substitutes:
