= 1968 Sligo Senior Football Championship =

Gaelic football competition

Sligo Senior Football Championship 1968
Tournament details
- County: Sligo
- Year: 1968

Winners
- Champions: St. Patrick's, Dromard (1st win)

Promotion/Relegation
- Promoted team(s): n/a
- Relegated team(s): n/a

This is a round-up of the 1968 Sligo Senior Football Championship. St. Patrick's Dromard, led by Sligo star Micheal Kearins, were crowned champions for the first time, after a win over their West Sligo rivals Easkey in the final.

== Quarter-finals ==
Game	Date	Venue	Team A	Score	Team B	Score
Sligo SFC; Quarter-final	25 August	Markievicz Park	Muire Naofa	3–4	Grange/Drumcliffe	1–4
Sligo SFC; Quarter-final	25 August	Markievicz Park	Easkey	beat	Bunninadden	(no score)
Sligo SFC; Quarter-final	1 September	Ballymote	Collooney/Ballisodare	beat	Tubbercurry	(no score)
Sligo SFC; Quarter-final	1 September	Ballymote	St. Patrick's	beat	Craobh Rua	(no score)

== Semi-finals ==
Game	Date	Venue	Team A	Score	Team B	Score
Sligo SFC; Semi-final	6 October	Markievicz Park	Easkey	3–6	Muire Naofa	2–4
Sligo SFC; Semi-final	13 October	Markievicz Park	St. Patrick's	2–5	Collooney/Ballisodare	0–4

== Sligo Senior Football Championship Final ==
St. Patrick's	1-8 - 1-2 (final score after 60 minutes)	Easkey
Team: T. Cummins; F. Leonard; A. Boland; T. McMunn; S. Donegan; J. Cuffe; J. Kilgallon; M. Kearins (0–5); J. Kilgannon; P. Kearins (0–1); R. Boland; P. McMunn (0–1); T. Leonard (1–0); S. Beckett (0–1); P. Cummins Substitutes: D. O'Connor	Half-time: Competition: Sligo Senior Football Championship (Final) Date: 27 October 1968 Venue: Markievicz Park, Sligo Referee: L. McCormack	Team: J. Conlon; M. Taylor; J.P. McGuire; S. Weir; F. Lyons; T. Roddy; V. Cuffe; E. Mullen; T.J. Lyons; O. McHugh (0–1); M. Kenny (0–1); M. McHugh (1–0); P.J. Sloyane; S Calleary; S. Rolston Substitutes: J. Devaney; G. Kenny; M. McNamara
