= 1978 Sligo Senior Football Championship =

Gaelic football competition

Sligo Senior Football Championship 1978
Tournament details
- County: Sligo
- Year: 1978

Winners
- Champions: Tourlestrane (2nd win)

Promotion/Relegation
- Promoted team(s): n/a
- Relegated team(s): Shamrock Gaels, Easkey, Owenmore Gaels, Calry Gaels, Mullinabreena, St. Farnan's, Grange, Geevagh

This is a round-up of the 1978 Sligo Senior Football Championship. Tourlestrane won their first title in 22 years, after defeating surprise finalists Grange, who had caused a major upset by knocking out the holders and reigning Connacht champions, St. Mary's, in the semi-final after a replay. This final remains not only Grange's only appearance in a Senior final, but the only occasion that a team from North Sligo has reached the final. The Championship structure was changed in this year, from the two-section round-robin method, to a knockout system, where the sides defeated in the opening round played on in their own section, with two sides qualifying for the semi-finals, while two sides from the "winner's section" joined them in the last four. This was the only year that such a backdoor system operated in the Championship.

At the end of the year a more significant structure change took place - the Intermediate grade was introduced for 1979, with the sixteen teams divided in two by league position - the top eight remaining in Senior, the rest demoted to the new grade, and one went to Junior with the Junior champions taking their place in Intermediate. The result was that the 1978 finalists Grange, found themselves relegated along with semi-finalists Shamrock Gaels. Other sides who had made an impact in the previous decade, including Easkey, Mullinabreena and Owenmore Gaels, also made the drop, with the latter being the only one of the eight not to return to Senior level since.

== First round ==
Game	Date	Venue	Team A	Score	Team B	Score
Sligo SFC; First Round	18 June	Ballymote	Tubbercurry	2-15	Shamrock Gaels	0-10
Sligo SFC; First Round	18 June	Ballymote	Tourlestrane	3-9	Coolera	0-7
Sligo SFC; First Round	18 June	Tubbercurry	St. Mary's	beat	Geevagh	(24 pts)
Sligo SFC; First Round	18 June	Tubbercurry	Curry	beat	Easkey	(1 pt)
Sligo SFC; First Round	18 June	Markievicz Park	Eastern Harps	2-5	Grange	0-9
Sligo SFC; First Round	18 June	Markievicz Park	Owenmore Gaels	beat	Calry Gaels	(no score)
Sligo SFC; First Round	18 June	Easkey	Enniscrone	beat	St. Farnan's	(no score)
Sligo SFC; First Round	18 June	Easkey	St. Patrick's	1-11	Mullinabreena	0-6

== Second round ==
Game	Date	Venue	Team A	Score	Team B	Score
Sligo SFC; Second Round (Winner's Section)	23 July	Ballymote	St. Mary's	1-8	Tubbercurry	0-10
Sligo SFC; Second Round (Loser's Section)	23 July	Ballymote	Geevagh	1-15	Calry Gaels	1-2
Sligo SFC; Second Round (Winner's Section)	23 July	Tubbercurry	Eastern Harps	2-12	Owenmore Gaels	0-4
Sligo SFC; Second Round (Loser's Section)	23 July	Tubbercurry	Shamrock Gaels	4-10	Easkey	1-7
Sligo SFC; Second Round (Loser's Section)	23 July	Markievicz Park	Grange	3-13	Coolera	3-7
Sligo SFC; Second Round (Loser's Section)	23 July	Markievicz Park	Mullinabreena	1-9	St. Farnan's	2-6
Sligo SFC; Second Round (Winner's Section)	23 July	Easkey	Tourlestrane	beat	Enniscrone	(no score)
Sligo SFC; Second Round (Winner's Section)	23 July	Easkey	St. Patrick's	1-10	Curry	0-6

== Quarter finals ==
Game	Date	Venue	Team A	Score	Team B	Score
Sligo SFC; Quarter Final (Loser's Section)	6 August	Ballymote	Shamrock Gaels	4-8	Geevagh	2-2
Sligo SFC; Quarter Final (Loser's Section)	6 August	Ballymote	Grange	1-15	Mullinabreena	0-10
Sligo SFC; Quarter Final (Winner's Section)	6 August	Tubbercurry	St. Mary's	0-13	Eastern Harps	2-6
Sligo SFC; Quarter Final (Winner's Section)	6 August	Tubbercurry	Tourlestrane	4-9	St. Patrick's	0-7

== Semi-finals ==
Game	Date	Venue	Team A	Score	Team B	Score
Sligo SFC; Semi-Final	27 August	Tubbercurry	Grange	0-9	St. Mary's	0-9
Sligo SFC; Semi-Final	27 August	Tubbercurry	Tourlestrane	3-8	Shamrock Gaels	1-5
Sligo SFC; Semi-Final Replay	3 September	Tubbercurry	Grange	2-5	St. Mary's	0-10

== Sligo Senior Football Championship Final ==
Tourlestrane	2-7 - 0-7 (final score after 60 minutes)	Grange
Team: A. Nealon; N. Brett; D. O'Mahony; M. Maye; J. Quinn; M. Brennan; M. Henry; P. Henry; G. Lundy; B. Leonard; P.J. Gallagher (1-0); A. Brennan (1-3); L. Walshe (0-2); T. Carty (0-1); M. Curran (0-1) Substitutes:	Half-time: Competition: Sligo Senior Football Championship (Final) Date: 10 September 1978 Venue: Markievicz Park, Sligo Referee:	Team: C. Feeney; C. Herrity; J. Watters; H. Gallagher; J. Keaney; S. Hoey; R. Henry; S. Kelly; E. O'Loughlin; J. Watters (0-1); M. Hoey (0-3); M. Feeney; J. Feeney (0-1); S. Feeney (0-1); H. McSharry (0-1) Substitutes:
