= 2003 Sligo Senior Football Championship =

Gaelic football competition

Tournament details
- County: Sligo
- Year: 2003

Winners
- Champions: Curry (5th win)
- Manager: Denis Kearney
- Captain: Kevin Giblin

Promotion/Relegation
- Promoted team(s): Ballymote
- Relegated team(s): St. Patrick's, Dromard

This is a round-up of the 2003 Sligo Senior Football Championship. Curry ended a 31-year wait for Championship glory, defeating holders Eastern Harps in the decider.

== Group stages ==
The Championship was contested by 14 teams, divided into four groups. The top two sides in each group advanced to the quarter-finals, with the remaining sides facing the Relegation playoffs to retain Senior status for 2004.

=== Group A ===
| Date | Venue | Team A | Score | Team B | Score |
|---|---|---|---|---|---|
| 26 July | Kent Park | St. John's | 1-12 | St. Molaise Gaels | 1-9 |
| 27 July | Easkey | Tourlestrane | 0-14 | St. Patrick's | 0-4 |
| 3 August | Kent Park | St. John's | 0-11 | St. Patrick's | 1-4 |
| 9 August | Kent Park | St. Molaise Gaels | 0-10 | St. Patrick's | 0-6 |
| 10 August | Ballymote | Tourlestrane | 3-7 | St. John's | 0-10 |
| 17 August | Kent Park | Tourlestrane | 2-12 | St. Molaise Gaels | 0-5 |

| Team | Pld | W | D | L | For | Against | Pts |
|---|---|---|---|---|---|---|---|
| Tourlestrane | 3 | 3 | 0 | 0 | 5-33 | 0-19 | 6 |
| St. John's | 3 | 2 | 0 | 1 | 1-33 | 5-20 | 4 |
| St. Molaise Gaels | 3 | 1 | 0 | 2 | 1-24 | 3-30 | 2 |
| St. Patrick's | 3 | 0 | 0 | 3 | 1-14 | 0-35 | 0 |

=== Group B ===
| Date | Venue | Team A | Score | Team B | Score |
|---|---|---|---|---|---|
| 26 July | Tubbercurry | Coolera/Strandhill | 0-11 | Easkey | 0-8 |
| 27 July | Kent Park | Tubbercurry | 3-6 | Shamrock Gaels | 1-11 |
| 2 August | Tubbercurry | Coolera/Strandhill | 0-12 | Shamrock Gaels | 0-7 |
| 2 August | Enniscrone | Easkey | 2-12 | Tubbercurry | 0-4 |
| 9 August | Ballymote | Coolera/Strandhill | 2-13 | Tubbercurry | 0-6 |
| 10 August | Markievicz Park | Easkey | 2-10 | Shamrock Gaels | 1-9 |

| Team | Pld | W | D | L | For | Against | Pts |
|---|---|---|---|---|---|---|---|
| Coolera/Strandhill | 3 | 3 | 0 | 0 | 2-36 | 0-21 | 6 |
| Easkey | 3 | 2 | 0 | 1 | 4-30 | 1-24 | 4 |
| Tubbercurry | 3 | 1 | 0 | 2 | 3-16 | 5-36 | 2 |
| Shamrock Gaels | 3 | 0 | 0 | 3 | 2-27 | 5-28 | 0 |

=== Group C ===
| Date | Venue | Team A | Score | Team B | Score |
|---|---|---|---|---|---|
| 27 July | Kent Park | Drumcliffe/Rosses Point | 1-11 | Castleconnor | 0-4 |
| 3 August | Ballymote | Drumcliffe/Rosses Point | 0-9 | Bunninadden | 0-6 |
| 10 August | Tubbercurry | Bunninadden | 2-13 | Castleconnor | 1-16 |

| Team | Pld | W | D | L | For | Against | Pts |
|---|---|---|---|---|---|---|---|
| Drumcliffe/Rosses Point | 2 | 2 | 0 | 0 | 1-20 | 0-10 | 4 |
| Bunninadden | 2 | 0 | 1 | 1 | 2-19 | 1-25 | 1 |
| Castleconnor | 2 | 0 | 1 | 1 | 1-20 | 3-24 | 1 |

=== Group D ===
| Date | Venue | Team A | Score | Team B | Score |
|---|---|---|---|---|---|
| 26 July | Coola | Eastern Harps | 0-12 | St. Mary's | 0-11 |
| 3 August | Ballymote | Curry | 1-10 | Eastern Harps | 1-10 |
| 9 August | Enniscrone | Curry | 1-10 | St. Mary's | 1-10 |

| Team | Pld | W | D | L | For | Against | Pts |
|---|---|---|---|---|---|---|---|
| Eastern Harps | 2 | 1 | 1 | 0 | 1-22 | 1-21 | 3 |
| Curry | 2 | 0 | 2 | 0 | 2-20 | 2-20 | 2 |
| St. Mary's | 2 | 0 | 1 | 1 | 1-21 | 1-22 | 1 |

== Playoff ==
There was one playoff required, in Group C where Castleconnor surprised the 2000 Champions Bunninadden to win by a point.

| Game | Date | Venue | Team A | Score | Team B | Score |
|---|---|---|---|---|---|---|
| Sligo SFC; Playoff | 17 August | Tubbercurry | Castleconnor | 0-7 | Bunninadden | 0-6 |

== Quarterfinals ==
| Game | Date | Venue | Team A | Score | Team B | Score |
|---|---|---|---|---|---|---|
| Sligo SFC; Quarter Final | 30 August | Ballymote | Curry | 2-17 | Drumcliffe/Rosses Point | 0-7 |
| Sligo SFC; Quarter Final | 31 August | Tubbercurry | Eastern Harps | 1-8 | Castleconnor | 0-5 |
| Sligo SFC; Quarter Final | 31 August | Markievicz Park | Tourlestrane | 0-12 | Easkey | 0-6 |
| Sligo SFC; Quarter Final | 31 August | Kent Park | St. John's | 0-11 | Coolera/Strandhill | 0-6 |

== Semi-finals ==
| Game | Date | Venue | Team A | Score | Team B | Score |
|---|---|---|---|---|---|---|
| Sligo SFC; Semi-Final | 13 September | Tubbercurry | Curry | 1-11 | Tourlestrane | 1-6 |
| Sligo SFC; Semi-Final | 14 September | Markievicz Park | Eastern Harps | 2-12 | St. John's | 0-4 |

== Last eight ==
Quarterfinals; 30 August/August 31
Eastern Harps | 1-8
Castleconnor | 0-5
St. John's | 1-11
Coolera/Strandhill | 1-6
Tourlestrane | 0-12
Easkey | 0-6
Curry | 2-17
Drumcliffe/Rosses Point | 0-7

Semifinals; 13 September/September 14
Eastern Harps | 2-12
St. John's | 0-4
Tourlestrane | 1-6
Curry | 1-11

Final; 5 October
Eastern Harps | 0-8
Curry | 0-11

== Sligo Senior Football Championship Final ==
| Curry | 0-11 - 0-8 (final score after 60 minutes) | Eastern Harps |
| Manager:Denis Kearney Team: J. Durcan; B. Collins; G. Kennedy; S. Marren; B. McDonagh; M. Durcan; B. Giblin; S. Davey (0-1); D. Colleary (0-1); G. Maye (0-1); K. Giblin (Capt); A. Marren (0-5); P. Henry; P. Durcan (0-1); K. Davey Substitutes: B. McDonagh (0-2); J. Henry; A. Loftus; A. Brennan | Half-time: 0-3 - 0-5 Competition: Sligo Senior Football Championship (Final) Date: Sunday, 5 October 2003 Venue: Markievicz Park, Sligo Referee: Marty Duffy (Enniscrone) | Manager:Eamon Clarke Team: P. Walsh; K. Gallagher; K. Phillips; P. Phillips; P McGovern; B. Phillips (Capt); F. Sexton; P. Grady; T. Taylor; K. Carty (0-2); R. Donovan; M. Doddy (0-1); R. Hannon; P. Taylor (0-5); S. Dorrian Substitutes: M. McCormack; P. Henry; S. Gallagher; T. Cryan |

== Relegation ==
| Game | Date | Venue | Team A | Score | Team B | Score |
|---|---|---|---|---|---|---|
| Sligo SFC; Relegation Playoff | 30 August | Markievicz Park | St. Mary's | 7-18 | St. Molaise Gaels | 1-7 |
| Sligo SFC; Relegation Playoff | 30 August | Tubbercurry | Shamrock Gaels | 1-10 | St. Patrick's | 1-5 |
| Sligo SFC; Relegation Playoff | 31 August | Ballymote | Tubbercurry | 2-10 | Bunninadden | 3-5 |
| Sligo SFC; Relegation Playoff | 6 September | Kent Park | St. Molaise Gaels | 0-15 | St. Patrick's | 1-3 |
| Sligo SFC; Relegation Playoff Final | 14 September | Tubbercurry | Bunninadden | 1-17 | St. Patrick's | 1-6 |
