= 1973 Sligo Senior Football Championship =

Gaelic football competition

Sligo Senior Football Championship 1973
Tournament details
- County: Sligo
- Year: 1973

Winners
- Champions: St. Patrick's, Dromard (4th win)

Promotion/Relegation
- Promoted team(s): n/a
- Relegated team(s): n/a

This is a round-up of the 1973 Sligo Senior Football Championship. St. Patrick's regained the Owen B. Hunt Cup in this year after defeating Craobh Rua in the final. A new name appeared in the Championship entrants this year - Eastern Harps, an amalgamation of Keash, 1964 finalists and intermittent competitors at Senior level, and Gurteen.

== First round ==
Game	Date	Venue	Team A	Score	Team B	Score
Sligo SFC; First Round	22 July	Ballymote	Coolera	0-11	Curry	0-7
Sligo SFC; First Round	22 July	Ballymote	Shamrock Gaels	1-8	Eastern Harps	1-7
Sligo SFC; First Round	22 July	Tubbercurry	Tourlestrane	1-7	Tubbercurry	2-2
Sligo SFC; First Round	22 July	Tubbercurry	Craobh Rua	3-13	Ballymote/Geevagh	0-2
Sligo SFC; First Round	22 July	Markievicz Park	Collooney/Ballisodare	beat	Muire Naofa	(no score)
Sligo SFC; First Round	22 July	Markievicz Park	Mullinabreena	3-12	Easkey	1-5
Sligo SFC; First Round	22 July	Easkey	St. Patrick's	beat	Enniscrone	(no score)
Sligo SFC; First Round	29 July	Tubbercurry	Grange/Calry	2-9	St. Farnan's	1-4

== Quarter-finals ==
Game	Date	Venue	Team A	Score	Team B	Score
Sligo SFC; Quarter-final	12 August	Markievicz Park	Shamrock Gaels	beat	Mullinabreena	(no score)
Sligo SFC; Quarter-final	12 August	Markievicz Park	Collooney/Ballisodare	beat	Grange/Calry	(no score)
Sligo SFC; Quarter-final	19 August	Tubbercurry	Craobh Rua	beat	Tourlestrane	(no score)
Sligo SFC; Quarter-final	19 August	Ballymote	St. Patrick's	1-11	Coolera	1-6

== Semi-finals ==
Game	Date	Venue	Team A	Score	Team B	Score
Sligo SFC; Semi-final	26 August	Tubbercurry	St. Patrick's	0-10	Shamrock Gaels	0-9
Sligo SFC; Semi-final	26 August	Tubbercurry	Craobh Rua	0-11	Collooney/Ballisodare	1-8
Sligo SFC; Semi-final Replay	2 September	Tubbercurry	Craobh Rua	1-11	Collooney/Ballisodare	1-8

== Sligo Senior Football Championship Final ==
St. Patrick's	1-10 - 0-8 (final score after 60 minutes)	Craobh Rua
Team: T. Cummins; E. Rushe; A. Boland; J. Cuffe; S. Clarke; P.J. Kilcullen; L. Boland; M. Kearins (0-7); J. Kilgallon (0-2); P. McMunn; R. Boland; P. Kearins; M. James; T. Tempany; J. Kearins (1-1) Substitutes: M. Farrell	Half-time: Competition: Sligo Senior Football Championship (Final) Date: 16 September 1973 Venue: Markievicz Park, Sligo Referee:	Team: J. Devitt; J. McGuigan; J. Fitzgerald; M. Kearins; B. Murphy; P. Joyce; P. Fitzpatrick; G. Soden; M. Laffey; K. Delaney; S. Connelly; M. Gorman (0-6); D. Kerins (0-1); F. Brett; P. McDermott Substitutes: S. Brosnan (0-1); C. Smith
