= 1995 Sligo Senior Football Championship =

Gaelic football competition

Tournament details
- County: Sligo
- Year: 1995

Winners
- Champions: Eastern Harps (3rd win)
- Manager: Denis Johnson
- Captain: Eamon Malloy

Promotion/Relegation
- Promoted team(s): Coolera/Strandhill, Calry/St. Joseph's
- Relegated team(s): St. Patrick's Dromard, Grange

This is a round-up of the 1995 Sligo Senior Football Championship. Eastern Harps regained the Owen B. Hunt Cup following a comfortable win over Tubbercurry in the latter's last final appearance to date. Other notable points from the Championship included the surprise exit of holders Tourlestrane, after a heavy defeat to unfancied Drumcliffe/Rosses Point, and the relegation of St. Patrick's, Dromard, after a long and successful spell at Senior level lasting some three decades, and seven titles.

== First round ==
Game	Date	Venue	Team A	Score	Team B	Score
Sligo SFC; First Round	30 July	Ballymote	St. Mary's	2-8	Curry	0-8
Sligo SFC; First Round	30 July	Ballymote	Shamrock Gaels	3-7	Bunninadden	0-10
Sligo SFC; First Round	30 July	Calry	Drumcliffe/Rosses Point	1-17	Grange	1-11
Sligo SFC; First Round	30 July	Enniscrone	Tourlestrane	4-11	Castleconnor	2-7

== Quarter finals ==
Game	Date	Venue	Team A	Score	Team B	Score
Sligo SFC; Quarter Final	13 August	Markievicz Park	St. Mary's	1-12	St. Patrick's	0-2
Sligo SFC; Quarter Final	13 August	Markievicz Park	Drumcliffe/Rosses Point	2-16	Tourlestrane	1-8
Sligo SFC; Quarter Final	13 August	Ballymote	Eastern Harps	4-11	Easkey	1-9
Sligo SFC; Quarter Final	13 August	Ballymote	Tubbercurry	1-9	Shamrock Gaels	0-12
Sligo SFC; Quarter Final Replay	22 August	Ballymote	Tubbercurry	0-10	Shamrock Gaels	1-5

== Semi-finals ==
Game	Date	Venue	Team A	Score	Team B	Score
Sligo SFC; Semi-Final	27 August	Markievicz Park	Eastern Harps	1-7	St. Mary's	1-6
Sligo SFC; Semi-Final	27 August	Markievicz Park	Tubbercurry	0-13	Drumcliffe/Rosses Point	1-8

== Sligo Senior Football Championship Final ==
Eastern Harps	2-14 - 0-10 (final score after 60 minutes)	Tubbercurry
Team: Substitutes:	Half-time: Competition: Sligo Senior Football Championship (Final) Date: 10 September 1995 Venue: Markievicz Park, Sligo Referee:	Team: Substitutes:
