= 1996 Sligo Senior Football Championship =

Gaelic football competition

Tournament details
- County: Sligo
- Year: 1996

Winners
- Champions: St Mary's (9th win)
- Manager: T.J. Kilgallon
- Captain: Tommy Breheny

Promotion/Relegation
- Promoted team(s): Ballymote, Enniscrone
- Relegated team(s): Bunninadden, Castleconnor

This is a round-up of the 1996 Sligo Senior Football Championship. St. Mary's made a triumphant return after a nine-year gap, with a late surge to deny Eastern Harps back-to-back titles. John Kent won his ninth Senior Championship in the process, a record unequalled, having played with all of the town side's title-winning teams prior to this win.

== First round ==
| Game | Date | Venue | Team A | Score | Team B | Score |
|---|---|---|---|---|---|---|
| Sligo SFC; First Round | 11 August | Ballymote | Eastern Harps | 1-7 | Drumcliffe/Rosses Point | 0-8 |
| Sligo SFC; First Round | 11 August | Ballymote | Bunninadden | 3-8 | Shamrock Gaels | 0-6 |
| Sligo SFC; First Round | 11 August | Markievicz Park | Coolera/Strandhill | 2-10 | Castleconnor | 1-3 |
| Sligo SFC; First Round | 11 August | Markievicz Park | St. Mary’s | 2-19 | Calry/St. Joseph’s | 1-7 |

== Quarter finals ==
| Game | Date | Venue | Team A | Score | Team B | Score |
|---|---|---|---|---|---|---|
| Sligo SFC; Quarter Final | 25 August | Markievicz Park | Easkey | 1-13 | Tubbercurry | 1-13 |
| Sligo SFC; Quarter Final | 25 August | Markievicz Park | Eastern Harps | 1-7 | Coolera/Strandhill | 0-4 |
| Sligo SFC; Quarter Final | 25 August | Ballymote | St. Mary’s | 1-10 | Curry | 1-9 |
| Sligo SFC; Quarter Final | 25 August | Ballymote | Tourlestrane | 1-9 | Bunninadden | 1-7 |
| Sligo SFC; Quarter Final Replay | 31 August | Markievicz Park | Easkey | 1-10 | Tubbercurry | 3-3 |

== Semi-finals ==
| Game | Date | Venue | Team A | Score | Team B | Score |
|---|---|---|---|---|---|---|
| Sligo SFC; Semi-Final | 7 September | Markievicz Park | Eastern Harps | 1-12 | Easkey | 1-7 |
| Sligo SFC; Semi-Final | 7 September | Markievicz Park | St. Mary’s | 2-9 | Tourlestrane | 0-11 |

== Sligo Senior Football Championship Final ==
| St. Mary's | 2-9 - 0-14 (final score after 60 minutes) | Eastern Harps |
| Manager:T.J. Kilgallon Team: Substitutes: | Half-time: Competition: Sligo Senior Football Championship (Final) Date: 22 September 1996 Venue: Markievicz Park, Sligo Referee: | Manager:Denis Johnson Team: Substitutes: |
