= 1998 Sligo Senior Football Championship =

Gaelic football competition

Tournament details
- County: Sligo
- Year: 1998

Winners
- Champions: Eastern Harps (4th win)
- Manager: Denis Johnson
- Captain: Paul Taylor

Promotion/Relegation
- Promoted team(s): Castleconnor, Grange
- Relegated team(s): Enniscrone, Cloonacool

This is a round-up of the 1998 Sligo Senior Football Championship. Eastern Harps atoned for the previous year's heavy defeat to Tourlestrane, reversing the result to win their fourth title. This was the last Championship to date to be played under the knockout system, as the round-robin section would be introduced for 1999.

== First round ==
Game	Date	Venue	Team A	Score	Team B	Score
Sligo SFC; First Round	25 July	Markievicz Park	St. Mary's	4-16	Enniscrone	0-4
Sligo SFC; First Round	26 July	Ballymote	Eastern Harps	2-13	Bunninadden	0-11
Sligo SFC; First Round	26 July	Enniscrone	Curry	0-13	Easkey	0-5
Sligo SFC; First Round	26 July	Markievicz Park	Tourlestrane	1-19	Drumcliffe/Rosses Point	0-8

== Quarter finals ==
Game	Date	Venue	Team A	Score	Team B	Score
Sligo SFC; Quarter Final	9 August	Markievicz Park	Tourlestrane	1-16	Coolera/Strandhill	1-7
Sligo SFC; Quarter Final	9 August	Markievicz Park	Curry	0-12	Shamrock Gaels	1-7
Sligo SFC; Quarter Final	9 August	Ballymote	Eastern Harps	0-16	Cloonacool	0-4
Sligo SFC; Quarter Final	9 August	Ballymote	Tubbercurry	2-10	St. Mary's	1-10

== Semi-finals ==
Game	Date	Venue	Team A	Score	Team B	Score
Sligo SFC; Semi-Final	6 September	Markievicz Park	Eastern Harps	3-11	Tubbercurry	0-8
Sligo SFC; Semi-Final	6 September	Markievicz Park	Tourlestrane	1-11	Curry	1-10

== Sligo Senior Football Championship Final ==
Eastern Harps	0-9 – 0-6 (final score after 60 minutes)	Tourlestrane
Manager:Denis Johnson Team: P. Walsh; F. Sexton; O. Shannon; D. Mullaney; D. Ballantyne; M. Cosgrove; S. King; J. Chambers (0-1); M. McCormack; K. Carty; J. Bruen (0-1); B. Phillips; E. Molloy; P. Taylor (Capt) (0-6); S. Dorrian (0-1) Substitutes: R. Hannon	Half-time: 0-4 – 0-3 Competition: Sligo Senior Football Championship (Final) Date: 20 September 1998 Venue: Markievicz Park, Sligo Referee: Pat Conway (St. Mary's)	Manager:Neil Egan Team: P. McVann; P. Durkin; F. Kennedy; P. Egan; J. Curley; D. Durkin; N. Manley; E. Walsh (0-1); E. O'Hara; J. Egan; M. Walsh (0-1); S. Dunne; S. King; G. McGowan (0-4); R. Kennedy Substitutes: C. O'Meara; L. Gaughan
