= 2001 Sligo Senior Football Championship =

Gaelic football competition

Tournament details
- County: Sligo
- Year: 2001

Winners
- Champions: St Mary's (10th win)
- Manager: Tommy Breheny
- Captain: Niall Murray

Promotion/Relegation
- Promoted team(s): Grange/Cliffoney, Geevagh
- Relegated team(s): n/a

This is a round-up of the 2001 Sligo Senior Football Championship. St. Mary's returned to claim their tenth title, defeating Curry by three points in the final. Holders Bunninadden exited in the group stages, with the 2000 finalists Coolera/Strandhill eliminating them from the Championship.

== Group stages ==
The Championship was contested by 12 teams, divided into four groups. The top two sides in each group advanced to the quarter-finals.

=== Group A ===
Date	Venue	Team A	Score	Team B	Score
14 July	Ballymote	Tourlestrane	2-9	Bunninadden	1-9
29 July	Ballymote	Coolera/Strandhill	1-13	Bunninadden	2-9
12 August	Easkey	Coolera/Strandhill	3-8	Tourlestrane	1-12

Team	Pld	W	D	L	For	Against	Pts
Coolera/Strandhill	2	2	0	0	4-21	3-21	4
Tourlestrane	2	1	0	1	3-21	4-17	2
Bunninadden	2	0	0	2	3-18	3-22	0

=== Group B ===
Date	Venue	Team A	Score	Team B	Score
14 July	Ballymote	Eastern Harps	2-10	Shamrock Gaels	1-5
29 July	Markievicz Park	St. John's	0-12	Shamrock Gaels	1-9
12 August	Coola	St. John's	1-7	Eastern Harps	0-7

Team	Pld	W	D	L	For	Against	Pts
St. John's	2	1	1	0	1-19	1-16	3
Eastern Harps	2	1	0	1	2-17	2-12	2
Shamrock Gaels	2	0	1	1	2-14	2-22	1

=== Group C ===
Date	Venue	Team A	Score	Team B	Score
14 July	Markievicz Park	Easkey	2-11	Drumcliffe/Rosses Point	1-9
29 July	Enniscrone	Curry	1-15	Easkey	2-9
12 August	Ballymote	Curry	3-13	Drumcliffe/Rosses Point	1-4

Team	Pld	W	D	L	For	Against	Pts
Curry	2	2	0	0	4-28	3-13	4
Easkey	2	1	0	1	4-20	2-24	2
Drumcliffe/Rosses Point	2	0	0	2	2-13	5-24	0

=== Group D ===
Date	Venue	Team A	Score	Team B	Score
14 July	Enniscrone	St. Mary's	1-16	Tubbercurry	1-11
29 July	Tourlestrane	Tubbercurry	0-10	Castleconnor	0-8
12 August	Markievicz Park	St. Mary's	3-14	Castleconnor	1-5

Team	Pld	W	D	L	For	Against	Pts
St. Mary's	2	2	0	0	4-30	2-16	4
Tubbercurry	2	1	0	1	1-21	1-24	2
Castleconnor	2	0	0	2	1-13	3-24	0

== Quarterfinals ==
Game	Date	Venue	Team A	Score	Team B	Score
Sligo SFC; Quarter Final	18 August	Tourlestrane	Curry	1-6	Tubbercurry	0-7
Sligo SFC; Quarter Final	19 August	Tubbercurry	St. Mary's	2-12	Easkey	1-9
Sligo SFC; Quarter Final	19 August	Ballymote	Tourlestrane	1-14	St. John's	0-9
Sligo SFC; Quarter Final	19 August	Markievicz Park	Eastern Harps	0-12	Coolera/Strandhill	1-8

== Semi-finals ==
Game	Date	Venue	Team A	Score	Team B	Score
Sligo SFC; Semi-Final	9 September	Tubbercurry	Curry	1-10	Tourlestrane	0-9
Sligo SFC; Semi-Final	9 September	Markievicz Park	St. Mary's	2-10	Eastern Harps	0-10

== Last eight ==
Quarterfinals; 18 August/August 19
St. Mary's	2-12
Easkey	1-9
Coolera/Strandhill	1-8
Eastern Harps	0-12
Curry	1-6
Tubbercurry	0-7
Tourlestrane	1-14
St. John's	0-9

Semifinals; 9 September
St. Mary's	2-10
Eastern Harps	0-10
Curry	1-10
Tourlestrane	0-9

Final; 30 September
St. Mary's	1-11
Curry	0-11

== Sligo Senior Football Championship Final ==
St. Mary's	1-11 - 0-11 (final score after 60 minutes)	Curry
Manager:Tommy Breheny Team: N. Walsh; J. Martyn; D. Carroll; C. Walsh; A. Collery; N. Murray (Capt); P. Leonard (0-1); S. Burns; P. Mullan; M. Bree (0-1); R. Bree; P. Bree; J. Davey (1-3); M. Breheny (0-5); D. Caffrey (0-1) Substitutes: J. Campbell; D. Downes	Half-time: 1-2 - 0-8 Competition: Sligo Senior Football Championship (Final) Date: 15.30 BST; Sunday, 30 September 2001 Venue: Markievicz Park, Sligo Referee: Dermot Mullaney (Enniscrone)	Manager:Denis Kearney Team: J. Gilmartin; A. Loftus; J. Hayes; S. Marren; B. Giblin; M. Durcan; B. McDonagh; G. Maye (Capt)(0-4); K. Giblin (0-1); D. Colleary (0-1); J. Henry; P. Henry (0-3); S. Davey (0-2); P. Durcan; T. Henry Substitutes: B. McDonagh; P. Gallagher; A. Marren; D. Giblin
