= 2009 Sligo Senior Football Championship =

Gaelic football competition

Tournament details
- County: Sligo
- Year: 2009

Winners
- Champions: Tourlestrane (9th win)
- Manager: Anthony Brennan

Promotion/Relegation
- Promoted team(s): Geevagh
- Relegated team(s): Easkey, St.Farnan's, Castleconnor

This is a round-up of the 2009 Sligo Senior Football Championship to date. Tourlestrane were crowned champions on 4 October after beating the then current winners Eastern Harps.

== Group stages ==
The Championship was contested by 14 teams, divided into four groups. Two with three teams and two with four teams. The top two sides in each group advanced to the quarter-finals, with the bottom sides in each group facing the Relegation group stages to retain Senior status for 2010, as the restructuring of the Championships went through its final stages.

=== Group A ===
Date	Venue	Team A	Score	Team B	Score
25 July	Tubbercurry	Calry/St.Joseph's	1-13	Easkey	2-8
25 July	Ballymote	St.John's	1-15	Tubbercurry	0-8
8 August	Markievicz Park	Calry/St.Joseph's	0-13	St.John's	1-13
8 August	Enniscrone	Easkey	0-9	Tubbercurry	1-11
15 August	Tubbercurry	Easkey	0-14	St.John's	1-17
15 August	Markievicz Park	Calry/St.Joseph's	2-11	Tubbercurry	1-7

Team	Pld	W	D	L	For	Against	Pts
St.John's	3	3	0	0	3-45	0-35	6
Calry/St.Joseph's	3	2	0	1	3-37	4-28	4
Tubbercurry	3	1	0	2	2-26	3-35	2
Easkey	3	0	0	3	2-31	3-41	0

=== Group B ===
Date	Venue	Team A	Score	Team B	Score
25 July	Ballymote	Curry	0-12	St.Marys	0-9
25 July	Tubbercurry	Eastern Harps	3-14	Shamrock Gaels	0-5
8 August	Kent Park	Curry	1-14	Shamrock Gaels	0-9
8 August	Tubbercurry	Eastern Harps	1-7	St.Mary's	1-10
15 August	Tourlestrane	Curry	0-9	Eastern Harps	1-15
15 August	Ballymote	Shamrock Gaels	0-6	St.Mary's	1-13

Team	Pld	W	D	L	For	Against	Pts
Eastern Harps	3	2	0	1	5-36	1-24	4
St.Mary's	3	2	0	1	2-35	1-24	4
Curry	3	2	0	1	1-35	1-33	4
Shamrock Gaels	3	0	0	3	0-20	5-41	0

=== Group C ===
Date	Venue	Team A	Score	Team B	Score
25 July	Coola	Coolera/Strandhill	0-8	Tourlestrane	0-8
16 August	Tubberucurry	St. Farnan's	0-11	Tourlestrane	0-18
22 August	Markievicz Park	Coolera/Strandhill	2-11	St. Farnan's	2-4

Team	Pld	W	D	L	For	Against	Pts
Tourlestrane	2	1	1	0	0-26	0-19	3
Coolera/Strandhill	2	1	1	0	2-19	2-12	3
St. Farnan's	2	0	0	2	2-15	2-29	0

=== Group D ===
Date	Venue	Team A	Score	Team B	Score
25 July	Kent Park	Castleconnor	1-7	St.Molaise Gaels	1-11
8 August	Markievicz Park	Ballymote	0-11	St.Molaise Gaels	1-12
16 August	Tubbercurry	Ballymote	1-12	Castleconnor	0-13

Team	Pld	W	D	L	For	Against	Pts
St.Molaise Gaels	2	2	0	0	2-23	1-18	4
Ballymote	2	1	0	1	1-23	1-25	2
Castleconnor	2	0	0	2	1-20	2-23	0

== Quarter finals ==
Game	Date	Venue	Team A	Score	Team B	Score
Sligo SFC; Quarter Final	29 August	Markievicz Park	Tourlestrane	3-6	Ballymote	2-9
Sligo SFC; Quarter Final	29 August	Markievicz Park	St.Molaise Gael	0-9	Coolera/Strandhill	1-14
Sligo SFC; Quarter Final	30 August	Markievicz Park	Eastern Harps	0-12	Calry/St.Joseph's	2-6
Sligo SFC; Quarter Final	30 August	Markievicz Park	St.John's	0-12	St.Mary's	0-9
Sligo SFC; Quarter Final Replay	5 September	Tubbercurry	Ballymote	1-8	Tourlestrane	2-13
Sligo SFC; Quarter Final Replay	5 September	Tubbercurry	Calry/St.Joseph's	0-10	Eastern Harps	1-17

== Semi-finals ==
Game	Date	Venue	Team A	Score	Team B	Score
Sligo SFC; Semi-Final	12 September	Markievicz Park	Coolera/Strandhill	1-5	Eastern Harps	0-10
Sligo SFC; Semi-Final	18 September	Markievicz Park	St.John's	1-14	Tourlestrane	1-14
Sligo SFC; Semi-Final Replay A.E.T.	26 September	Markievicz Park	St.John's	1-9	Tourlestrane	1-11

== Sligo Senior Football Championship Final ==
Eastern Harps	0-7 - 1-8	Tourlestrane
Manager:John Breun Team: B.McHugh, K.Cryan, R.Donovan, P.Rafferty, P.McGovern, B.Phillips, K.Gallagher, T.Taylor, P.Grady, M.Doddy, N.McGill, K.Carty, J.Rafferty, P.Taylor, S.Gallagher. Substitutes:	Half-time: 0-2 - 0-3 Competition: Sligo Senior Football Championship (Final) Date: Sunday, 4 October 2009 Venue: Markievicz Park, Sligo Referee: Des Henry (Drumcliffe-Rosses Point)	Manager:Anthony Brennan Team: S.Gildea, C.Neary, N.Gaughan, B.Kennedy, S.King, A.McIntyre, D.Durkin, S.Dunne, E.O'Hara, G.Gaughan, S.Henry, J.Leonard, G.McGowan, B.Egan, J.Marren. Substitutes:

=== Group A ===
Date	Venue	Team A	Score	Team B	Score
29 August	Curry	Castleconnor	1-10	Shamrock Gaels	2-11
5 September	Tourlestrane	Castleconnor	0-9	Curry	3-9
13 September	Tubbercurry	Curry	2-18	Shamrock Gaels	0-8

Team	Pld	W	D	L	For	Against	Pts
Curry	2	2	0	0	5-27	0-17	4
Shamrock Gaels	2	1	0	1	2-19	3-28	3
Castleconnor	2	0	0	2	1-19	5-20	0

=== Group B ===
Date	Venue	Team A	Score	Team B	Score
29 August	Kent Parl	Easkey	1-9	Tubbercurry	3-12
5 September	Enniscrone	Easkey	3-11	St.Farnan's	1-8
13 September	Enniscrone	Tubbercurry	1-13	St.Farnan's	0-7

Team	Pld	W	D	L	For	Against	Pts
Tubbercurry	2	2	0	0	4-25	1-16	4
Easkey	2	1	0	1	4-20	4-20	3
St.Farnan's	2	0	0	2	1-15	4-24	0

=== Relegation Final ===
Game	Date	Venue	Team A	Score	Team B	Score
Sligo SFC; Relegation Final	25 September	Tourlestrane	Easkey	0-12	Shamrock Gaels	0-12
Sligo SFC; Relegation Final Replay	17 October	Tubbercurry	Easkey	1-9	Shamrock Gaels	2-14

=== Reserve Final ===
Game	Date	Venue	Team A	Score	Team B	Score
Sligo SFC; Reserve Final	19 September	Tubbercurry	Curry	4-16	Tubbercurry	0-9
