= Sligo county hurling team =

Hurling team

Sligo
- Sport: Hurling
- Irish: Sligeach
- Manager: Tom Hennessy
- Home venue(s): Markievicz Park, Sligo

Recent competitive record
- Current All-Ireland status: Nicky Rackard Cup
- Last championship title: 2019 Nicky Rackard Cup
- Current NHL Division: 3 (7th in 2025; related to Division 4)
First colours	Second colours

The Sligo county hurling team represents Sligo in hurling and is governed by Sligo GAA, the county board of the Gaelic Athletic Association. The team competes in the Nicky Rackard Cup and the National Hurling League. It formerly competed in the abolished Connacht Senior Hurling Championship, finishing as runner-up in 1900 and 1906.

Sligo's home ground is Markievicz Park, Sligo. The team's manager is Stephen Sheil.

The team has never won the Connacht Senior Championship, the All-Ireland Senior Championship or the National League.

== History ==
Sligo is traditionally a weak team at senior level. Despite this, the hurlers have attained noticeably more success than their football counterparts, with the county's most notable early achievement being appearance in the finale. All-Ireland Junior Hurling Championship final was played on 6 October 1968 at Glebe Park in Birmingham, where Warwickshire defeated Kerry by a scoreline of 1–14 to 1–09.

Sligo won the All-Ireland Minor 'C' Hurling Championship in August 1986, defeating Tyrone by four points at Croke Park.

Sligo won the 2005 National Hurling League Division 3 title.

Sligo, under the management of Mickey Galvin, won its first All-Ireland hurling title at senior level by defeating Louth in the 2008 Nicky Rackard Cup final. The team did not achieve promotion however, losing a play-off to Roscommon.

The under-16 team won the 2012 All-Ireland "C" hurling title by defeating Tyrone at the Monaghan Centre of Excellence.

2018 had both senior and minor teams bring national silverware back to the Land of the Shells. Sligo won a senior All-Ireland title for the first time since 2008. The men, jointly managed by Daithí Hand and Darragh Cox in their first senior hurling management role, defeated Lancashire in the 2018 Lory Meagher Cup final, with a last-minute Kevin Gilmartin goal (his third of the game) sealing the victory. Benny Kenny's under-17 squad, a few weeks later, defeated Donegal to become All-Ireland Celtic Challenge Cup Champions in the Michael Feery Cup, also defeating Mayo, Roscommon and others along the way.

The county team won a second consecutive senior title in 2019 under Hand, Peter Galvin and coach Colum O'Meara. Having been promoted to the Nicky Rackard Cup, the team topped Group 2, eliminating favourite Mayo, in a drawn game after beating Tyrone and Louth in previous games.

Following on from a 2–21 to 2–17 victory over Warwickshire at Celtic Park, Sligo advanced to the 2019 Nicky Rackard Cup final at Croke Park.

Facing a heavily tipped Armagh side, Sligo became champions with a Conor Griffin point, a Gerard O'Kelly-Lynch goal and a 73rd-minute point by young substitute Kieran Prior. The scoreline at the game's conclusion was 2–14 to 2–13; though the team was four points behind Armagh as the game entered injury-time, the two lates points and the goal meant Sligo secured a one-point victory. James Weir, at 19 years of age and the youngest ever All-Ireland winning captain, lifted aloft the Nicky Rackard Cup thus giving Sligo official recognition as a dual county.

Hand and fellow management team member Peter Galvin tendered their resignations on the evening of 14 September 2020, less than one month before the team was scheduled to contest a National League final and make its debut in the Christy Ring Cup. Confusion over efforts to register two players from Galway with Sligo heritage and the involvement of one of their coaches with a club, unbeknownst to Hand and Galvin, were cited as partly contributing to this unexpected decision. The county board did not report their departures until 20 September. The coach, later named as Colum O'Meara, then applied (unsuccessfully) to become Hand's successor; O'Meara, a native of Killimor, County Galway, had joined the Sligo set-up as coach ahead of the 2019 season after parting ways with Longford.

Padraig Mannion ultimately succeeded Hand as Sligo manager in late 2020.

== Panel ==
Team as per Sligo vs Wicklow in the Christy Ring Cup, 23 April 2022

No.	Player	Position	Club
1	Jimmy Gordon	Goalkeeper	Easkey
2	Niall Kilcillen	Right corner-back	Easkey
3	Mark Hannify	Full-back	Oranmore–Maree (Galway)
4	Kevin O'Kennedy	Left corner-back	Coolaney–Mullinabreena
5	Gavin Connolly	Right half-back	St Farnan's
6	Rory McHugh	Centre-back	Easkey
7	Niall Feehily	Left half-back	Naomh Eoin
8	Finnian Cawley	Midfield	St Farnan's
9	Patrick Foley	Midfield	Clarinbridge (Galway)
10	Michael Munnelly	Right half forward	Naomh Eoin
11	Gerard O'Kelly-Lynch	Center half-forward	Naomh Eoin
12	Conor Hannify	Left half-forward	Oranmore–Maree (Galway)
13	Joe McHugh	Right corner-forward	Easkey
14	Andrew Kilcullen	Full-forward	Easkey
15	Thomas Cawley	Left corner-forward	St Farnan's

No.	Player	Position	Club
16	Matt Davey	Substitute	Naomh Eoin
17	Ronan Redmond	Substitute	Coolera–Strandhill
18	Darragh Cawley	Substitute	Naomh Eoin
19	Eoghan-Rua McGowan	Substitute	Easkey
20	Fionn Moylan	Substitute	Easkey
21	Fionn Connolly	Substitute	St Farnan's
22	Ronan Forkin	Substitute	Tubbercurry
23	Tony O'Kelly-Lynch	Substitute	Naomh Eoin
24	Ruairi Brennan	Substitute	Tourlestrane
25	Eoin Commerford	Substitute	Coolera–Strandhill
26	Kevin Gilmartin	Substitute	Calry–St Joseph's
27	Liam O'Kelly-Lynch	Substitute	Naomh Eoin
28	Ronan Molloy	Substitute	St Farnan's

^{INJ} Player has had an injury which has affected recent involvement with the county team.
^{RET} Player has since retired from the county team.
^{WD} Player has since withdrawn from the county team due to a non-injury issue.

== Management team ==
Appointed 6 October 2023:

- Manager: Stephen Sheil
- Management team: Donal O'Brien, Séamus Qualter

== Managerial history ==
- Mickey Galvin: c. 2008, e.g. Lory Meagher Cup (see The Irish Times source)
- Daithí Hand and Darragh Small: c. 2018
- Daithí Hand: c. 2019–20
- Padraig Mannion: 2020–2023
- Stephen Sheil: 2023–

== Players ==
=== Records ===
- Paul Seevers would be a prominent hurler for his county for more the 20 years. Seevers won the 2008 Nicky Rackard Cup with his county, three Railway Cups with Connacht and represented Ireland against Scotland in the 2003 Shinty-Hurling International Series.
- Gerard O'Kelly-Lynch also represented Ireland, in his case in 2018.

=== Awards ===
- Champion 15:
- 2015: Keith Raymond, Gerard O'Kelly-Lynch, Gary Cadden
- 2018: James Weir
  Gary Cadden^{2nd}
- 2019: James Weir^{2nd}, Keith Raymond^{2nd}, Gerard O'Kelly-Lynch^{2nd}
- 2021: Gerard O'Kelly-Lynch^{3rd}
- 2022: Andrew Kilcullen

== List of seasons ==
=== Season-by-season record ===
Year	Championship								National Hurling League		Other	
Year	Competition	Lvl	Pld	W	D	L	Pts	Position	Division	Position	Competition	Position
2005	Nicky Rackard Cup	3	3	1	0	2	2	Group Stage	Division 2	11th (R)	—	—
2006	Nicky Rackard Cup	3	4	2	1	1	5	Quarter-Finals	Division 3	7th	—	—
2007	Nicky Rackard Cup	3	2	0	0	2	0	Group Stage	Division 3	2nd	—	—
2008	Nicky Rackard Cup	3	6	5	0	1	10	1st (lost promotion playoff)	Division 3	5th (R)	—	—
2009	Nicky Rackard Cup	3	3	1	0	2	2	Won relegation playoff	Division 4	1st	—	—
2010	Nicky Rackard Cup	3	4	2	0	2	4	Semi-Finals	Division 3B	5th	—	—
2011	Nicky Rackard Cup	3	2	0	0	2	0	Quarter-Finals	Division 3B	6th	—	—
2012	Nicky Rackard Cup	3	2	0	0	2	0	Quarter-Finals	Division 3A	6th (R)	—	—
2013	Nicky Rackard Cup	3	2	0	0	2	0	Quarter-Finals	Division 3B	2nd	—	—
2014	Nicky Rackard Cup	3	4	0	0	4	0	Qualifier Round 1 (relegated)	Division 3B	4th	—	—
2015	Lory Meagher Cup	4	5	3	0	2	6	Runners-Up	Division 3B	4th	—	—
2016	Lory Meagher Cup	4	5	3	0	2	6	Runners-Up	Division 3B	4th	—	—
2017	Lory Meagher Cup	4	5	3	0	2	6	3rd	Division 3B	3rd	—	—
2018	Lory Meagher Cup	5	4	3	0	1	6	1st (promoted)	Division 3B	3rd	—	—
2019	Nicky Rackard Cup	4	5	4	1	0	9	1st (promoted)	Division 3B	2nd	—	—
2020	Christy Ring Cup	3	2	0	0	2	0	Round 2	Division 3B	1st (P)	—	—
2021	Christy Ring Cup	3	3	1	0	2	2	Semi-Finals	Division 3A	1st (P)	—	—
2022	Christy Ring Cup	3	5	1	0	4	2	5th	Division 2B	2nd	Connacht Hurling League	2nd
2023	Christy Ring Cup	3	5	3	0	2	6	3rd	Division 2B	6th(R)	Connacht Hurling League	QF
2024	Christy Ring Cup	3	5	0	0	5	0	6th (relegated)	Division 3A	2nd	Connacht Hurling League	QF
2025	Nicky Rackard Cup	4	5	2	1	2	5	4th	Division 3	7th(R)		

== Competitive record ==
=== Head-to-head Championship record ===
Every championship result since the restructuring of the hurling championships in 2005.

Positive Record Neutral Record Negative Record

As of 17 August 2022.

County team	Pld	W	D	L	Win %	First meeting	Last meeting	Province
Armagh	5	1	0	4	20%	2007	2019	Ulster
Cavan	3	2	0	1	67%	2008	2018	Ulster
Derry	3	0	0	3	0%	2020	2022	Ulster
Donegal	2	0	1	1	0%	2005	2006	Ulster
Fermanagh	6	5	0	1	83%	2005	2018	Ulster
Fingal	2	1	0	1	50%	2008	2011	Leinster
Kildare	1	0	0	1	0%	2022	2022	Leinster
Lancashire	5	5	0	0	100%	2015	2018	Britain
Leitrim	3	2	0	1	67%	2015	2017	Connacht
London	2	0	0	2	0%	2010	2022	Britain
Longford	1	0	0	1	0%	2014	2014	Leinster
Louth	9	3	0	6	33%	2006	2019	Leinster
Mayo	2	0	1	1	0%	2019	2022	Connacht
Meath	1	0	0	1	0%	2009	2009	Leinster
Monaghan	4	2	0	2	50%	2009	2014	Ulster
Offaly	1	0	0	1	0%	2021	2021	Leinster
Roscommon	4	1	0	3	25%	2008	2021	Connacht
Tyrone	6	3	0	3	50%	2005	2019	Ulster
Warwickshire	5	3	0	2	60%	2008	2019	Britain
Wicklow	1	1	0	0	100%	2022	2022	Leinster

Sligo has not played the following teams in the championship since 2005:

Province	No.	Counties
Connacht	1	Galway
Leinster	6	Carlow, Dublin, Kilkenny, Laois, Westmeath, Wexford
Munster	6	Clare, Cork, Kerry, Limerick, Tipperary, Waterford
Ulster	2	Antrim, Down

== Honours ==
=== National ===
- Christy Ring Cup
  - (bronze) Semi-finalists (1): 2021
- Nicky Rackard Cup
  - (gold) Winners (2): 2008, 2019
- Lory Meagher Cup
  - (gold) Winners (1): 2018
  - (silver) Runners-up (2): 2015, 2016
- National Hurling League Division 3
  - (gold) Winners (2) 2004, 2021
- National Hurling League Division 3B
  - (gold) Winners (1): 2020
- National Hurling League Division 4
  - (gold) Winners (2): 2009, 2026

=== Provincial ===
- Connacht Senior Hurling Championship
  - (silver) Runners-up (2): 1900, 1906
- Connacht Junior Hurling Championship
  - (gold) Winners (3): 1968, 1973, 2019
  - (silver) Runners-up (7): 1929, 1930, 1954, 1963 1967, 1976, 2004
