= 2022 National Hurling League =

91st season of the National Hurling League

League details
- Dates: 5 February – 3 April 2022
- Teams: 35

League champions
- Winners: Waterford (4th win)
- Captain: Conor Prunty
- Manager: Liam Cahill

League runners-up
- Runners-up: Cork

Other division winners
- Division 2A: Westmeath
- Division 2B: Derry
- Division 3A: Tyrone
- Division 3B: Fermanagh

The 2022 National Hurling League, known for sponsorship reasons as the Allianz Hurling League, was the 91st season of the National Hurling League, an annual hurling competition held in Ireland for county teams. Three English county teams also featured (having missed the 2021 tournament due to COVID-19 restrictions).

Galway and Kilkenny entered the season as holders, having shared the 2021 NHL title.

On 2 April, Waterford won the National Hurling League for the fourth time after a 4-20 to 1-23 win against Cork in the final.

== Format ==
League structure

Thirty-five teams are due to compete in the 2022 NHL –

- twelve teams organised in two six-team groups of approximately equal strength in Division 1
- six teams in Divisions 2A, 2B and 3A
- five teams in Division 3B.

All thirty-two county teams from Ireland take part. London, Lancashire and Warwickshire complete the lineup.

Teams by Province and Division
Province	Div 1	Div 2A	Div 2B	Div 3A	Div 3B	Total
Connacht	1	0	2	1	1	5
Leinster	5	4	1	1	1	12
Munster	5	1	0	0	0	6
Ulster	1	1	2	3	2	9
Britain	0	0	1	1	1	3
Total	12	6	6	6	5	35

Each team plays all the other teams in their division once, either home or away. Two points are awarded for a win, and one for a draw.

Tie-breaker

- If only two teams are level on league points, the team that won the head-to-head match is ranked ahead. If this game was a draw, score difference (total scored minus total conceded in all games) is used to rank the teams.
- If three or more teams are level on league points, score difference is used to rank the teams.

Finals, promotions and relegations

Division 1

- The winner of group 1A will play the runners up of group 1B in the first semi final, and the winner of group 1B will play the runners up of group 1A in the other semi final.

The winners of the semi-finals will play each other in the NHL final.

- The bottom team in each group meet in a relegation play-off, with the losers being relegated to Division 2A

Division 2A

- The top two teams meet in Division 2A final, with the winners being promoted to Division 1
- The bottom team is relegated to Division 2B

Division 2B

- The top two teams meet in Division 2B final, with the winners being promoted to Division 2A
- The bottom two teams meet in a relegation play-off, with the losers being relegated to Division 3A

Division 3A

- The top two teams meet in Division 3A final, with the winners being promoted to Division 2B
- The bottom team is relegated to Division 3B

Division 3B

- The top two teams meet in Division 3B final, with the winners being promoted to Division 3A

== Division 1 ==
Locations of the 2022 NHL Division 1 teams.
Red: Group A; Green: Group B.

=== Division 1 Format ===
The top twelve teams compete in Division 1 in two six-team groups of approximately equal strength. This group structure was introduced in 2020; the groups were redrawn for 2022 and 2023.

Each team play all the other teams in their group once. Two points are awarded for a win and one for a draw. The top two teams in each group qualify for the NHL semi finals. The bottom teams in each group meet in a relegation playoff with the losing team relegated to Division 2A.

=== Division 1 Group A Table ===
NHL semi final Relegation play-off

Team	Pld	W	D	L	F	A	Diff	Pts
Wexford	5	5	0	0	111	87	24	10
Cork	5	4	0	1	147	109	38	8
Galway	5	3	0	2	124	111	13	6
Limerick	5	1	1	3	107	101	6	3
Clare	5	1	1	3	123	121	2	3
Offaly	5	0	0	5	86	169	-83	0

=== Division 1 Group A Rounds 1 to 5 ===
==== Division 1 Group A Round 1 ====
Saturday, February 5th 7.45pm Round 1	Cork	2-30 - 2-21	Clare	Páirc Uí Chaoimh; Referee: Murphy (Limerick)
Saturday, February 5th 7.45pm Round 1	S Kingston 0-9 (0-5 f, 0-1 65), M Coleman 0-5 (0-3 free), D Fitzgibbon 0-4, C Joyce, S Barrett 0-3 each, L Meade, T O’Mahony 1-0 each, S Harnedy 0-2, R Downey, C Lehane, A Cadogan, P Power 0-1 each.	Report	M Rodgers 1-5 (0-2 free), C Malone 0-5, D Reidy 0-3 f, D McMahon 1-0, R Taylor, D Ryan, P Crotty 0-2 each, P Donnellan, S Meehan 0-1 each.	Páirc Uí Chaoimh; Referee: Murphy (Limerick)

Sunday, February 6th Round 1; 1.45pm	Wexford	1-11 - 0-11	Limerick	Chadwick's Wexford Park; Attendance: 6,500; Referee: T Walsh (Waterford)
Sunday, February 6th Round 1; 1.45pm	J O’Connor (0-5, 4 frees), M Dwyer (1-0), O Foley, C Flood (0-2 each), D O’Keeffe, C McDonald (0-1 each).	Report	D Byrnes (0-3, 1 ’65, 2 frees), G Hegarty (0-3), A Gillane (0-2 frees), D Hannon, D Reidy (free), R Hanley (0-1 each).	Chadwick's Wexford Park; Attendance: 6,500; Referee: T Walsh (Waterford)

Sunday, February 6th 2.00pm Round 1	Galway	4-22 - 0-17	Offaly	Pearse Stadium; Referee: R McGann (Clare)
Sunday, February 6th 2.00pm Round 1	E Niland 1-6 (0-5f, 0-1 ’65), J Fleming 1-2, G McInerney 1-1, D O’Shea 1-1 (0-1 ’65), T Monaghan 0-3, C Whelan 0-3, R Glennon 0-2, B Concannon 0-1, C Fahy 0-1, J Hastings 0-1, E Burke 0-1.	Report	E Cahill 0-10 (0-8 free), L Langton 0-2f, J Screeney 0-1, K Sampson 0-1, J Sampson 0-1, J Murphy 0-1, A Cleary 0-1.	Pearse Stadium; Referee: R McGann (Clare)

==== Division 1 Group A Round 2 ====
Saturday, February 12th 7.00pm	Limerick	1-18 - 0-27	Galway	TUS Gaelic Grounds; Attendance: 13,877; Referee: F Horgan (Tipperary)
Saturday, February 12th 7.00pm	A Gillane 1-6 (5 free), C O’Neill 0-4, S Flanagan 0-2, D Byrne 0-2 (2 free), G Hegarty, R Connolly, T Morrissey, B Nash 0-1 each.	Report	C Cooney 0-10 (8 free), C Mannion, F Burke (2 sidelines) 0-4 each, J Cooney 0-3, R Glennon 0-2, J Hasting, C Whelan, T Monaghan, J Coen 0-1 each.	TUS Gaelic Grounds; Attendance: 13,877; Referee: F Horgan (Tipperary)

Sunday, February 13th 1.45pm	Clare	1-20 - 2-20	Wexford	Cusack Park; Attendance: 2,855; Referee: C Lyons (Cork)
Sunday, February 13th 1.45pm	M Rodgers 0-12 (0-11fs), S Meehan 1-0, P Donnellan 0-3, J Conlon, P Crotty 0-2 each, R Mounsey 0-1.	Report	J O'Connor 0-9 (6fs 1 65), R O'Connor 1-4, D O'Keeffe 1-0 C McDonald, D Reck 0-2 each, M Dwyer, C Flood, P Foley all 0-1 each	Cusack Park; Attendance: 2,855; Referee: C Lyons (Cork)

Sunday, February 13th 2.00pm	Offaly	1-15 - 4-25	Cork	St. Brendan's Park; Referee: S Stack (Dublin)
Sunday, February 13th 2.00pm	E Cahill 1-9 (0-8 free); J Murphy 0-2, J Sampson 0-1, B Duignan 0-1, B Conneely 0-1, L O’Connor 0-1.	Report	S Kingston 2-8 (0-6 free), C Lehane 1-2, D Fitzgibbon 1-2, M Coleman 0-4 free, R O’Flynn 0-2; M Keane 0-1, T O’Mahony 0-1, L Meade 0-1; C Cahalane 0-1, P Horgan 0-1, S Quirke 0-1, C O'Brien 0-1.	St. Brendan's Park; Referee: S Stack (Dublin)

==== Division 1A Round 3 ====
Sunday, February 27th 2pm	Galway	0-15 - 2-15	Wexford	Pearse Stadium; Referee: J Keenan (Wicklow)
Sunday, February 27th 2pm	C Cooney 0-9 (0-7f, 0-1 sideline), G McInerney 0-1, A Tuohey 0-1, J Cooney 0-1, C Fahy 0-1, J Fleming 0-1, K Cooney 0-1.	Report	R O’Connor 0-5 (0-1 free), O Pepper 1-1, C Dunbar 1-0, D O’Keeffe 0-2, P Foley 0-2 (0-2 free), J O’Connor 0-2 (0-2 free), M Dwyer 0-1, L Og McGovern 0-1, S Donohoe 0-1.	Pearse Stadium; Referee: J Keenan (Wicklow)

Sunday, February 27th 2pm	Offaly	0-16 - 4-20	Clare	Bord na Móna O'Connor Park
Sunday, February 27th 2pm	E Cahill (0-11, 10 free), J Murphy (0-2), E Kelly (0-1), L Langton (0-1), L O'Connor (0-1, free).	Report	T Kelly (2-12, 1 goal from a penalty and 7 free), R Taylor (1-2); S Meehan (1-1), A Shanaher (0-2), S Golden (0-1); P Crotty (0-1), D Ryan (0-1).	Bord na Móna O'Connor Park

Sunday, February 27th 3.45pm	Limerick	1-13 - 2-19	Cork	TUS Gaelic Grounds; Attendance: 12,081; Referee: S Stack (Dublin)
Sunday, February 27th 3.45pm	C O’Neill 1-1, D Byrnes (3 free) and D Reidy 0-3 (2 free) each, A Gillane 0-2 (2 free), S Flanagan, D O’Donovan, C Lynch and G Mulcahy 0-1 each.	Report	P Horgan 0-8 (6 free, 1 65), S Kingston 2-0, R O’Flynn, M Coleman (1 free), D Fitzgibbon and C Lehane 0-2 each, S Barrett, C Cahalane and T O’Mahony 0-1 each.	TUS Gaelic Grounds; Attendance: 12,081; Referee: S Stack (Dublin)

==== Division 1A Round 4 ====
Saturday, March 5th 2pm	Wexford	1-22 - 2-12	Offaly	Chadwicks Wexford Park; Referee: N Wall (Cork)
Saturday, March 5th 2pm	R O’Connor 1-11 9fs K Foley, 0-2, C Flood 0-2 C McDonald 0-2, C Dunbar 0-1, C Devitt 0-1, D O’Keeffe 0-1.	Report	L O’Connor 2-6 1 pen 4fs, J Keenaghan 0-2, A Cleary 0-2, S Corcoran 0-1f, P Clancy 0-1.	Chadwicks Wexford Park; Referee: N Wall (Cork)

Saturday, March 5th 7pm	Cork	1-26 - 0-23	Galway	Páirc Uí Chaoimh; Attendance: 13,063; Referee: T Walsh (Waterford)
Saturday, March 5th 7pm	P Horgan 1-13 (9 free, 1 65); S Harnedy 0-4; S Barrett, R O’Flynn, M Coleman 0-2 each; G Millerick, D Fitzgibbon, T O’Mahony 0-1 each.	Report	C Cooney 0-6 (5 ftrr); R Glennon 0-5; T Monaghan 0-4; G Lee J Cooney 0-2 each; C Mannion C Whelan, J Hastings, T Killeen 0-1 each.	Páirc Uí Chaoimh; Attendance: 13,063; Referee: T Walsh (Waterford)

Sunday, March 6th 1.45pm	Clare	0-18 - 0-18	Limerick	Cusack Park; Attendance: 10,016; Referee: P Murphy (Carlow)
Sunday, March 6th 1.45pm	T Kelly (0-11, 8 frees); D Fitzgerald (0-2); C Malone, S Meehan, R Taylor, R Mounsey (sideline), J McCarthy (0-1 each).	Report	A Gillane (0-7, 6 frees); D Byrnes (0-5, 3 frees); T Morrissey (0-2); G Hegarty, C O’Neill, A English, D Reidy (free) (0-1 each).	Cusack Park; Attendance: 10,016; Referee: P Murphy (Carlow)

==== Division 1A Round 5 ====
Sunday, March 20th 1.45pm	Galway	0-25 - 1-20	Clare	Pearse Stadium; Referee: J Owens (Wexford)
Sunday, March 20th 1.45pm	C Cooney 0-12 (0-7f, 0-2 ’65), C Mannion 0-5, T Monaghan 0-2, C Whelan 0-2, P Mannion 0-1, C Fahy 0-1, R Glennon 0-1, E Niland 0-1.	Report	T Kelly 1-9 (1-0p, 0-6f, 0-2 ’65), R Taylor 0-5, D Fitzgerald 0-4, C Malone 0-1, S Meehan 0-1.	Pearse Stadium; Referee: J Owens (Wexford)

Sunday, March 20th 1.45pm	Limerick	4-29 - 0-17	Offaly	TUS Gaelic Grounds; Referee: S Cleere (Kilkenny)
Sunday, March 20th 1.45pm	A Gillane (0-12, six frees), P Ryan (1-2), G Mulcahy (0-4), B Nash (1-0); O O’Reilly (1-0), C Lynch (1-0), G Hegarty (0-3), D Byrnes (0-3, two frees), C O’Neill (0-2), D O’Donovan (0-1); T Morrissey (0-1); D Reidy (0-1).	Report	L O’Connor (0-7, five frees, one ‘65), S Corcoran (0-3, three frees); L Langton (0-2), D Nally (0-1); C Burke (0-1), L Fox (0-1), E Kelly (0-1), P Clancy (0-1).	TUS Gaelic Grounds; Referee: S Cleere (Kilkenny)

Sunday, March 20th 1.45pm	Wexford	1-22 - 1-17	Cork	Chadwicks Wexford Park; Referee: F Horgan (Tipperary)
Sunday, March 20th 1.45pm	R O’Connor 1-12 (0-6 frees), C McDonald and O Foley 0-2 each, D O’Keeffe, J O’Connor, L Og McGovern, K Foley and C Byrne-Dunbar 0-1 each. P Foley 0-1 free.	Report	C Lehane 0-6 (0-3 frees), A Connolly 1-1, S Kingston 0-3 frees, R Downey 0-2, C Joyce 0-2 (0-1 free), L Meade, J O’Connor and M Keane 0-1 each.	Chadwicks Wexford Park; Referee: F Horgan (Tipperary)

=== Division 1 Group B Table ===
NHL semi final Relegation play-off

Team	Pld	W	D	L	F	A	Diff	Pts
Kilkenny	5	4	0	1	132	94	38	8
Waterford	5	3	1	1	155	116	39	7
Dublin	5	3	1	1	121	119	2	7
Tipperary	5	3	0	2	135	111	24	6
Laois	5	1	0	4	103	166	-63	2
Antrim	5	0	0	5	109	149	-40	0

=== Division 1 Group B Rounds 1 to 5 ===
==== Division 1 Group B Round 1 ====
5 February 2022; 6.00pm Round 1	Laois	1-14 - 0-21	Tipperary	MW Hire O'Moore Park; Referee: S Cleere (Kilkenny)
5 February 2022; 6.00pm Round 1	S Maher 0-8 (five frees), E Rowland 1-3 (1-1 ‘65s, 0-2 frees), J Keyes 0-3.	Report	J Forde 0-11 (six frees, 0-1 pen), M Kehoe 0-4, J Morris 0-3, M Breen 0-2, C Barrett 0-1	MW Hire O'Moore Park; Referee: S Cleere (Kilkenny)

6 February 2022; 1.00pm Round 1	Kilkenny	2-15 - 3-09	Antrim	UPMC Nowlan Park; Attendance: 2,163; Referee: P Murphy (Carlow)
6 February 2022; 1.00pm Round 1	M Keoghan 2-2, J Donnelly 0-4 (3 frees), J Bergin 0-3 (2 frees), P Walsh 0-2, P Deegan 0-1, H Lawlor 0-1, T Phelan 0-1, Walsh 0-1	Report	N McManus 1-2 (0-1 free), S Elliott 1-1, C Johnston 1-0, C Clarke 0-3 (all frees), K Molloy 0-1, E Campbell 0-1, D McKernan 0-1	UPMC Nowlan Park; Attendance: 2,163; Referee: P Murphy (Carlow)

6 February 2022; 3:45pm Round 1	Dublin	0-21 - 2-15	Waterford	Parnell Park; Referee: C Cunning (Antrim)
6 February 2022; 3:45pm Round 1	D Burke 0-12 (0-11 frees), C Burke 0-2, E O’Donnell, R McBride, D Sutcliffe, F Whiteley, R Hayes and E Dillon 0-1 each.	Report	Stephen Bennett 2-10 (2-0 penalties, 0-9 frees), DJ Foran 0-3, A Gleeson and C Dunford 0-1 each.	Parnell Park; Referee: C Cunning (Antrim)

==== Division 1B Round 2 ====
12 February 2022; Round 2	Antrim	2-15 - 2-19	Dublin	Corrigan Park; Referee: J Keenan (Wicklow)
12 February 2022; Round 2	N McManus 2-7 (1-0 pen, 5f 1 65), C Cunning, K Molloy 0-2 each, C Johnston, P Burke, N McKenna, J McNaughton (1 free) 0-1 each.	Report	D Burke 1-9 (1-0 pen, 7 free), P Crummey 1-0, F Whitely, D Sutcliffe 0-2 each, J Malone, J Bellew, J Madden, R McBride, E Dillon, C Crummey 0-1 each.	Corrigan Park; Referee: J Keenan (Wicklow)

13 February 2022; Round 2	Waterford	7-31 - 0-19	Laois	Walsh Park
13 February 2022; Round 2	Stephen Bennett 3-8 (2-0p, 0-6 reef), P Curran 1-7, C Kirwan 1-4, A Gleeson 1-3, C Daly 1-1, T Barron 0-2, J Prendergast, J Fagan, DJ Foran, M Fitzgerald, I Beecher, B Power 0-1 each.	Report	S Maher 0-8 (5f, 1 ‘65’), R King 0-4, E Rowland 0-2f, W Dunphy, S Bergin, R Mullanney, A Corby, F Fennell 0-1 each.	Walsh Park

13 February 2022; Round 2	Tipperary	1-19 - 1-18	Kilkenny	FBD Semple Stadium; Referee: L Gordon (Galway)
13 February 2022; Round 2	J Forde (0-10, 4 frees); J Morris (1-2); B Heffernan (0-2); R Maher M. Breen, D Maher, G Browne, B Hogan (free)(0-1 each).	Report	J Donnelly (0-5, 4 frees); P Walsh (0-4); T O’Dwyer (1-0); W Walsh (0-2); M Keoghan, T Phelan, D Blanchfield, M Carey, C Kenny, N Brassil, P Deegan (0-1 each).	FBD Semple Stadium; Referee: L Gordon (Galway)

==== Division 1B Round 3 ====
26 February 2022; Round 3	Tipperary	0-21 - 2-16	Dublin	FBD Semple Stadium; Referee: J Murphy (Limerick)
26 February 2022; Round 3	J Forde 0-12 (11 frees, 1 sideline); J Morris 0-3; R Byrne 0-2; M Breen, P Flynn, C Bowe, N McGrath 0-1 each.	Report	D Burke 0-9 (8 frees); R McBride 1-2; R Hayes 1-1; F Whitely 0-2; C Burke, J Madden 0-1 each.	FBD Semple Stadium; Referee: J Murphy (Limerick)

27 February 2022; Round 3	Antrim	2-22 - 3-21	Waterford	Corrigan Park; Referee: T Gleeson (Dublin)
27 February 2022; Round 3	N McManus (0-13, 8 frees, 1 65, 1 penalty), C Clarke (1-00), D Nugent (1-00), C Cunning (0-02); M Bradley (0-02), K Molloy (0-02), D McKernan (0-01); S Elliott (0-01), G Walsh (0-01).	Report	A Gleeson (0-08, 4 frees,1 sideline), C Dunford (2-01), Stephen Bennett (0-06, 5 frees), M Kiely (1-00), N Montgomery (0-02), T de Burca (0-01), T Barron (0-01); D Lyons (0-01), C Kirwan (0-01).	Corrigan Park; Referee: T Gleeson (Dublin)

27 February 2022; Round 3	Kilkenny	2-28 - 0-17	Laois	UPMC Nowlan Park; Referee: R Fitzsimons (Offaly)
27 February 2022; Round 3	A Murphy 0-13 (ten frees), B Ryan 0-4, T Phelan 2-1, M Keoghan 0-4, C Buckley 0-2, D Blanchfield 0-1, J Maher 0-1, W Walsh 0-1, J Walsh 0-1	Report	S Maher 0-3 (two frees), J Kelly 0-3, R King 0-3 (one free), E Rowland 0-2 (two frees), J Keyes 0-2, F C-Fennell 0-1, C Byrne 0-1, P Delaney 0-1, R Mullaney 0-1.	UPMC Nowlan Park; Referee: R Fitzsimons (Offaly)

==== Division 1B Round 4 ====
5 March 2022; Round 4	Dublin	0-16 - 2-23	Kilkenny	Parnell Park; Referee: P O'Dwyer (Carlow)
5 March 2022; Round 4	D Burke 0-9 (0-5f, 0-2 65), D Sutcliffe 0-3, R Hayes 0-2, R McBride and P Crummey 0-1 each.	Report	W Walsh 1-3, A Murphy 0-5 (0-4 free), P Walsh 0-4, M Keoghan 1-1, D Blanchfield 0-3, M Carey and B Ryan 0-2 each, C Kenny, C Buckley and J Donnelly 0-1 each.	Parnell Park; Referee: P O'Dwyer (Carlow)

6 March 2022; Round 4	Waterford	1-28 - 0-21	Tipperary	Walsh Park; Attendance: 5,865; Referee: C Lyons (Cork)
6 March 2022; Round 4	Stephen Bennett (1-16, 1 65, 12 frees); J Prendergast, P Curran (0-3 each); I Daly (0-2); M Mahony, M Kiely, K Bennett, T de Burca (0-1 each).	Report	J Forde (0-6, 4 frees); M Kehoe (0-4); M Breen (0-4); R Maher (1 free), C Bowe (0-2 each); J Morris, B Heffernan, B McGrath (0-1 each).	Walsh Park; Attendance: 5,865; Referee: C Lyons (Cork)

6 March 2022; Round 4	Laois	1-20 - 1-19	Antrim	MW Hire O'Moore Park; Referee: S Hynes (Galway)
6 March 2022; Round 4	S Maher 0-8 (4f, 2 ’65), C Dwyer 0-4, P Purcell 1-1, J Keyes, W Dunphy, PJ Scully (1f, 1 sideline) 0-2 each, E Rowland (free) 0-1 each.	Report	N McManus 1-7 (0-6f, 0-1 ’65), P Burke, M Bradley, C Cunning, C Clarke 0-2 each, D Kearney, G Walsh, E Campbell, S Elliott 0-1 each.	MW Hire O'Moore Park; Referee: S Hynes (Galway)

==== Division 1B Round 5 ====
Sunday, March 20th 1.45pm Round 5	Kilkenny	2-21 - 0-21	Waterford	UPMC Nowlan Park; Referee: J Murphy (Limerick)
Sunday, March 20th 1.45pm Round 5	A Murphy (4 free), P Walsh 0-5 each, B Ryan 1-1, C Buckley 1-0, W Walsh 0-3, E Cody 0-2, A Mullen, E Murphy (free), C Kenny, J Maher, J Donnelly 0-1 each.	Report	A Gleeson 0-7 (4f, 1 ‘65’), P Mahony (3 free), N Montgomery 0-3 each, D Hutchinson 0-2, M Kiely, D Lyons, J Fagan, C Dunford, C Dalton, C Daly 0-1 each.	UPMC Nowlan Park; Referee: J Murphy (Limerick)

Sunday, March 20th 1.45pm Round 5	Laois	1-24 - 2-31	Dublin	MW Hire O'Moore Park; Referee: C Cunning (antrim)
Sunday, March 20th 1.45pm Round 5	PJ Scully (0-7, 6 free), J Keyes (1-2); J Walshe (0-4); C Dwyer (0-4), R King (0-3, 2 free), C Fennell (0-2), P Delaney (0-1), C Byrne (0-1).	Report	D Burke (0-14, 10f, 1'65'), F Whitley (0-7), E Dillon (1-1), A Considine (1-1), D Keogh (0-3), R McBride (0-3); D Ryan (0-1); J Malone (0-1).	MW Hire O'Moore Park; Referee: C Cunning (antrim)

Sunday, March 20th 1.45pm Round 5	Tipperary	7-29 - 1-17	Antrim	FBD Semple Stadium; Referee: R McGann (Clare)
Sunday, March 20th 1.45pm Round 5	J Forde (1-8; 0-4 free), M Kehoe (2-3), J McGrath (2-3), M Breen (1-1); N McGrath (0-4), S Kennedy (1-0), R Maher (0-3), P Flynn (0-2), C Bowe (0-2), C Stakelum (0-2), R Byrne (0-1).	Report	K Molloy (0-5), J McNaughton (0-5; 0-2 free), D Nugent (1-0), S Elliott (0-2), C Cunning (0-1), C McCann (0-1), C Johnston (0-1); P Burke (0-1); S Walsh (0-1).	FBD Semple Stadium; Referee: R McGann (Clare)

=== Division 1 Semi-finals ===
26 March 2022; 19:15; Semi-final	Cork	1-27 - 2-20	Kilkenny	Páirc Uí Chaoimh; Attendance: 16,910; Referee: S Stack (Dublin)
26 March 2022; 19:15; Semi-final	P Horgan 0-9 (0-8 free), C Lehane 0-6 (0-3 free), D Fitzgibbon 1-3, A Connolly 0-4, S Kingston, S Barrett, R O’Flynn, T O’Mahony, C Joyce 0-1 each.	Report	M Keoghan 2-0, A Murphy 0-6 (0-4 free), E Cody, B Ryan 0-4 each, P Walsh 0-2, D Blanchfield, C Kenny, C Buckley, J Donnelly 0-1 each.	Páirc Uí Chaoimh; Attendance: 16,910; Referee: S Stack (Dublin)

27 March 2022; 15:45; Semi-final	Wexford	0-16 - 5-20	Waterford	UPMC Nowlan Park; Attendance: 7,815; Referee: J Keenan (Wicklow)
27 March 2022; 15:45; Semi-final	R O’Connor 0-5 (3fs), P Foley 0-2 (2fs), D Reck, D O’Keeffe, M Dwyer, C McGuckin, C McDonald, O Pepper, L Chin free), C Flood, J O’Connor 0-1 each.	Report	A Gleeson 2-3 (1 free), P Curran 0-7 (4fs, 2 65s), D Hutchinson 1-3, Shane Bennett, J Prendergast 1-0 each, J Fagan, M Kiely, P Mahony (1 free) 0-2 each, N Montgomery 0-1.	UPMC Nowlan Park; Attendance: 7,815; Referee: J Keenan (Wicklow)

=== Division 1 Final ===
2 April 2022; 7:15pm Final	Cork	1-23 - 4-20	Waterford	FBD Semple Stadium; Attendance: 18,930; Referee: L Gordon (Galway)
2 April 2022; 7:15pm Final	P Horgan 0-10 (0-8 fs, 0-1 65); R O’Flynn 1-3; S Kingston 0-3; C Lehane, S Barrett 0-2 each; D Fitzgibbon, S Harnedy, T O’Mahony 0-1 each.	Report	Stephen Bennett 2-11 (0-9 fs); P Curran 1-3; D Hutchinson 1-0; J Prendergast 0-3; N Montgomery, C Daly, DJ Foran 0-1 each.	FBD Semple Stadium; Attendance: 18,930; Referee: L Gordon (Galway)

=== Division 1 relegation play-off ===
The bottom teams in the two Division 1 groups meet in a play-off with the losers being relegated to Division 2A.

26 March 2022; 15:00 GMT; Playoff	Antrim	2-24 - 2-17	Offaly	Páirc Tailteann; Referee: R McGann (Clare)
26 March 2022; 15:00 GMT; Playoff	C Cunning 0-11 (9 frees), K Molloy 1-2, J McNaughton 1-2 (0-1 free, 0-1 65), C Clarke 0-4, G Walsh 0-1, E Campbell 0-1, J Maskey 0-1, C McCann 0-1, E O'Neill 0-1	Report	E Cahill 2-6 (1-3 frees, 1-0 penalty, 0-1 65), J Sampson 0-3, L O'Connor 0-3 (1 frees), D King 0-1, P Clancy 0-1, J Murphy 0-1, D Nally, S Corcoran 0-1 (free).	Páirc Tailteann; Referee: R McGann (Clare)

=== Division 1 scoring statistics ===
Top scorers overall

Rank	Player	Team	Tally	Total	Matches	Average
1	Stephen Bennett	Waterford	8-51	75	5	15.00
2	Donal Burke	Dublin	1-53	56	5	11.20
3	Jason Forde	Tipperary	1-47	50	5	10.00
4	Rory O'Connor	Wexford	3-37	46	5	10.25
5	Eoghan Cahill	Offaly	3-36	45	5	9.00
6	Patrick Horgan	Cork	1-41	44	5	8.80
7	Neil McManus	Antrim	4-29	41	4	10.25
7	Tony Kelly	Clare	3-32	41	3	13.66
9	Conor Cooney	Galway	0-37	37	4	9.25
10	Shane Kingston	Cork	4-24	36	6	6.00

Top scorers in a single game

Rank	Player	Team	Tally	Total	Opposition
1	Stephen Bennett	Waterford	1-16	19	Tipperary
2	Tony Kelly	Clare	2-12	18	Offaly
3	Stephen Bennett	Waterford	3-08	17	Laois
3	Stephen Bennett	Waterford	2-11	17	Cork
5	Stephen Bennett	Waterford	2-10	16	Dublin
5	Patrick Horgan	Cork	1-13	16	Galway
7	Rory O'Connor	Wexford	1-12	15	Cork
8	Shane Kingston	Cork	2-08	14	Offaly
8	Rory O'Connor	Wexford	1-11	14	Offaly
8	Donal Burke	Dublin	0-14	14	Laois

== Division 2A ==
Locations of the 2022 NHL Division 2A teams.

=== Division 2A Table ===
Division final place Semi final place Automatic relegation to Division 2B

Team	Pld	W	D	L	F	A	Diff	Pts
Down	5	4	0	1	105	99	6	8
Westmeath	5	3	0	2	119	94	25	6
Kerry	5	3	0	2	125	95	30	6
Carlow	5	2	1	2	98	97	1	5
Kildare	5	1	1	3	94	114	-20	3
Meath	5	1	0	4	96	138	-42	2

=== Division 2A Rounds 1 to 5 ===
==== Division 2A Round 1 ====
6 February 2022; Round 1	Down	2-10 - 1-12	Carlow	McKenna Park; Referee: T Gleeson (Dublin)
6 February 2022; Round 1	C Woods (0-5 frees), O McManus (1-1, 0-1 free), M Fisher (1-0), E Sands (0-1), R McCusker (0-1), P Sheehan (0-1 free), P Og McCrickard (0-1, sideline).	Report	M Kavanagh (0-6 frees), JM Nolan (1-0), S Murphy (0-3), K McDonald (0-1); S Treacy (0-1), C Kehoe (0-1).	McKenna Park; Referee: T Gleeson (Dublin)

6 February 2022; Round 1	Westmeath	3-15 - 1-15	Kerry	TEG Cusack Park; Referee: S Hynes (Galway)
6 February 2022; Round 1	J Gillen 2-6 (1-0 pen, 0-5 free), N Mitchell (1-0); K Regan (0-2), C Doyle (0-2), C Boyle (0-1), K Doyle (0-1, ‘65’), S McGovern (0-1); D McNicholas (0-1), J Galvin (0-1).	Report	S Conway 0-5 (4 free); P Ahern 0-4 (1 free), M Boyle (1-0), M Heffernan 0-2 (1 free), S Nolan (0-1), G Dooley (0-1), M Leane (0-1), F MacKessy (0-1).	TEG Cusack Park; Referee: S Hynes (Galway)

6 February 2022; Round 1	Kildare	0-15 - 0-18	Meath	St. Conleth's Park; Referee: R Fitzsimons (Offaly)
6 February 2022; Round 1	D Qualter 0-8, J Byrne 0-2, J Travers 0-2, P Dolan 0-1, C Bracken 0-1, F Bass 0-1.	Report	J Regan 0-12, J Kelly 0-2, M O'Sullivan 0-2, S Morris 0-1, D Reilly 0-1.	St. Conleth's Park; Referee: R Fitzsimons (Offaly)

==== Division 2A Round 2 ====
13 February 2022; Round 2	Kerry	4-18 - 2-16	Kildare	Austin Stack Park; Referee: N Wall (Cork)
13 February 2022; Round 2	S Conway (1-5, 2 free), P Boyle (0-5), S Nolan (1-1, pen), C Walsh (1-0), F Mackessy (1-0), C Harty (0-3), Paul Dolan (0-2), G Dooley (0-2), P Ahern (0-1), D Slattery (0-1).	Report	G Keegan (0-4), B Byrne (0-4, 2 free), D Qualter (1-0), K Aherne (1-0), J Sheridan (0-3, 2f, 1 ‘65), P Dolan (0-2), J Burke (0-1), J Travers (0-1), S Ryan (0-1).	Austin Stack Park; Referee: N Wall (Cork)

13 February 2022; Round 2	Meath	1-19 - 2-18	Down	St. Loman's Park; Referee: S Hynes (Galway)
13 February 2022; Round 2	J Regan 0-12 (10f, 1 ’65); D Healy 1-0; N Potterton 0-2; M O’Sullivan, P Potterton, A Gannon, S Geraghty, E O Donnchadha 0-1 each.	Report	P Sheehan (4 free), O MacManus (free) 0-5 each; D Sands 1-1; C Egan 1-0; C Woods 0-2 (2 free); M Conlon, D Hughes, R McCusker, J McManus, B Trainor 0-1 each.	St. Loman's Park; Referee: S Hynes (Galway)

13 February 2022; Round 2	Carlow	1-20 - 1-14	Westmeath	Netwatch Cullen Park; Referee: M Kennedy (Tipperary)
13 February 2022; Round 2	K McDonald 1-6 (3f); C Nolan 0-4; J Kavanagh, J Doyle 0-2 each; F Fitzpatrick, C Kehoe, D Byrne, T Joyce, J M Nolan, B Tracey (f) 0-1 each.	Report	J Gillen 1-6 (1-0 pen, 5f); K Doyle 0-3 (f); K Regan, A Clarke, D McNicholas, A Cox, C Doyle 0-1 each.	Netwatch Cullen Park; Referee: M Kennedy (Tipperary)

==== Division 2A Round 3 ====
27 February 2022; Round 3	Carlow	0-13 - 0-20	Kerry	Netwatch Cullen Park; Referee: S Cleere (Kilkenny)
27 February 2022; Round 3	K McDonald (0-7, 4f), C Nolan (0-3, 2f), R Coady (0-1), D Tobin (0-1), JM Nolan (0-1).	Report	S Conway (0-10, 8f, 1 sideline), P Boyle (0-4), P Ahern (0-2), G Dooley (0-1), P O’Connor (0-1), S Nolan (0-1), N Mulcahy (0-1).	Netwatch Cullen Park; Referee: S Cleere (Kilkenny)

27 February 2022; Round 3	Down	0-22 - 2-17	Kildare	McKenna Park; Referee: K Brady (Louth)
27 February 2022; Round 3	P Sheehan (0-10), C Woods (0-5), M Fisher (0-2), C Taggart (0-2), P Óg McCrickard (0-2), M Conlan (0-1), T Murray (0-1), C Egan (0-1), R Costello (0-1).	Report	J Sheridan (2-6), G Keegan (0-7), P Dolan (0-2), J Byrne (0-1), C McCabe (0-1).	McKenna Park; Referee: K Brady (Louth)

27 February 2022; Round 3	Meath	1-15 - 4-23	Westmeath	St. Loman's Park; Referee: C Mooney (Dublin)
27 February 2022; Round 3	J Regan 1-9 (1-0 pen, 8fs); A Gannon 0-2, J Kelly, S Whitty, M O'Sullivan, N Potterton 0-1 each.	Report	J Gillen 0-9 (7fs); K Doyle 1-5 (0-4 fs); N Mitchell 2-1; C Doyle 0-4; E Keyes 1-0; A Clarke 0-2; J Boyle, E Ahearne 0-1 each.	St. Loman's Park; Referee: C Mooney (Dublin)

==== Division 2A Round 4 ====
6 March 2022; Round 4	Kerry	2-31 - 0-14	Meath	Austin Stack Park; Referee: R McGann (Clare)
6 March 2022; Round 4	S Nolan (1-3), S Conway (0-6, 4f), M Leane (1-2), C Harty (0-5), P Boyle (0-5, 1f, 1 ‘65), N Mulcahy (0-2), F Mackessy (0-2), D Collins (0-2), P O’Connor (0-1), B Lonergan (0-1), M Slattery (0-1), D Slattery (0-1).	Report	J Regan (0-7, 6f), J Walsh (0-2), S Morris (0-2), M O’Sullivan (0-1), P Potterton (0-1), M Cole (0-1).	Austin Stack Park; Referee: R McGann (Clare)

6 March 2022; Round 4	Kildare	2-14 - 0-20	Carlow	St Conleth's Park; Referee: F Horgan (Tipperary)
6 March 2022; Round 4	G Keegan 1-3 (1 free), B Byrne 1-0, J Sheridan 0-3 (2 frees), P Dolan 0-3, C Dowling 0-2, C McCabe 0-1, S Ryan 0-1, P McKenna (free).	Report	K McDonald 0-10 (10 frees), C Nolan 0-4 (sideline), C Kehoe 0-2, S Murphy 0-2, JM Nolan 0-1, J Nolan 0-1.	St Conleth's Park; Referee: F Horgan (Tipperary)

6 March 2022; Round 4	Westmeath	1-16 - 1-18	Down	TEG Cusack Park; Referee: M Kennedy (Tipperary)
6 March 2022; Round 4	J Gillen (0-7, 4f, 2 ‘65s’), D McNicholas (1-1), J Boyle (0-3), K Doyle (0-2), C Doyle (0-2, 1f); T Doyle (0-1).	Report	P Sheehan (0-10, 5f, 1 ‘65’), E Sands (1-3), O McManus (0-2f), C Woods (0-1f), C Egan (0-1); M Fisher (0-1).	TEG Cusack Park; Referee: M Kennedy (Tipperary)

==== Division 2A Round 5 ====
19 March 2022; Round 5	Down	1-19 - 0-20	Kerry	McKenna Park; Referee: C Mooney (Dublin)
19 March 2022; Round 5	P Sheehan (0-7f), C Woods (1-2, 1 pen, 2f), O McManus (0-3, 2f), M Fisher (0-2), T Murray (0-1), M Conlon (0-1), P Óg McCrickard (0-1), D Sands (0-1), J Doran (0-1).	Report	S Conway (0-7, 6f), P Boyle (0-4), C Harty (0-3), M Leane (0-2), P O’Connor (0-1), F Mackessy (0-1), S Nolan (0-1), M O’Connor (0-1).	McKenna Park; Referee: C Mooney (Dublin)

20 March 2022; Round 5	Meath	1-21 - 2-21	Carlow	Páirc Tailteann; Referee: T Gleeson (Dublin)
20 March 2022; Round 5	J Regan 0-9 (6 fs, 2 65s), J Walsh 1-0, M Cole 0-3, J Kelly 0-2; S Whitty 0-1, D Reilly 0-1, S Morris 0-1, D Healy 0-1, M Burke 0-1, D Healy 0-1, P Potterton 0-1.	Report	M Kavanagh 0-15 (10 fs, 2 65s), C Nolan 2-0, S Murphy 0-2; F Fitzpatrick 0-1, K McDonald 0-1, N Bolger 0-1, D Byrne 0-1.	Páirc Tailteann; Referee: T Gleeson (Dublin)

20 March 2022; Round 5	Kildare	0-14 - 1-21	Westmeath	St Conleth's Park; Referee: M Kennedy (Kilkenny)
20 March 2022; Round 5	J Sheridan 0-4 (3 frees), C Dowling 0-2, K Whelan 0-2, J Byrne 0-2, G Keegan 0-2, J Burke 0-1, J Burke 0-1.	Report	J Boyle 0-5, R Greville 0-4 (1 free), C Boyle 1-0, K Doyle 0-3, D McNicholas 0-3, A Clarke 0-2, J Gillen 0-1 (free), C Doyle 0-1, J Galvin 0-1, K Regan 0-1.	St Conleth's Park; Referee: M Kennedy (Kilkenny)

=== Division 2A Semi-final ===
26 March 2022; Semi-final	Westmeath	2-18 - 0-21	Kerry	TEG Cusack Park; Referee: P Murphy (Carlow)
26 March 2022; Semi-final	K Doyle (0-9, 8f), D Glennon (1-0), N Mitichell (1-0), J Boyle (0-3), N O’Brien (0-1), R Greville (0-1), E Keyes (0-1), C Boyle (0-1), J Gillen (0-1), D McNicholas (0-01).	Report	S Conway (0-8, 5f), P Boyle (0-5, 2f), P O’Connor (0-2), F Mackessy (0-2), S Nolan (0-2), C Walsh (0-1), M O'Connor (0-1).	TEG Cusack Park; Referee: P Murphy (Carlow)

=== Division 2A Final ===
2 April 2022; Final	Down	1-17 - 5-19	Westmeath	FBD Semple Stadium; Referee: K Jordan (Tipperary)
2 April 2022; Final	R McCusker (0-4), P Sheehan (0-4; 1f, 1 ‘65), J Doran (1-0), T Murray (0-1), M Conlon (0-1), J McManus (0-1), C Woods (0-1f), C Teggart (0-1); P Og McCrickard (0-1), D Sands (0-1), T McGrattan (0-1), E Sands (0-1).	Report	K Doyle (1-11; 7f), D Glennon (3-1); J Boyle (0-4), C Boyle (1-0), D McNicholas (0-1), E Keyes (0-1), N O’Brien (0-1).	FBD Semple Stadium; Referee: K Jordan (Tipperary)

=== Division 2A scoring statistics ===
Top scorers overall

Rank	Player	Team	Tally	Total	Matches	Average
1	Jack Regan	Meath	1-49	52	5	10.40
2	Killian Doyle	Westmeath	2-34	40	7	5.71
3	Jack Gillen	Westmeath	3-30	39	7	5.57
4	Shane Conway	Kerry	1-41	44	6	7.33
5	Paul Sheehan	Down	0-37	37	6	6.16
6	Kevin McDonald	Carlow	1-25	28	5	5.60
7	Pádraig Boyle	Kerry	0-23	23	6	3.83
8	Jack Sheridan	Kildare	2-16	22	4	5.50
9	Martin Kavanagh	Carlow	0-21	21	3	7.00
10	Gerry Keegan	Kildare	1-16	19	4	4.75
10	Conor Woods	Down	1-16	19	6	3.16

Top scorers in a single game

Rank	Player	Team	Tally	Total	Opposition
1	Martin Kavanagh	Carlow	0-15	15	Meath
2	Killian Doyle	Westmeath	1-11	14	Down
3	Jack Gillen	Westmeath	2-06	12	Kerry
3	Jack Sheridan	Kildare	2-06	12	Down
3	Jack Regan	Meath	1-09	12	Westmeath
3	Jack Regan	Meath	0-12	12	Kildare
3	Jack Regan	Meath	0-12	12	Down
8	Shane Conway	Kerry	0-10	10	Carlow
8	Paul Sheehan	Down	0-10	10	Kildare
8	Kevin McDonald	Carlow	0-10	10	Kildare
8	Paul Sheehan	Down	0-10	10	Westmeath

== Division 2B ==
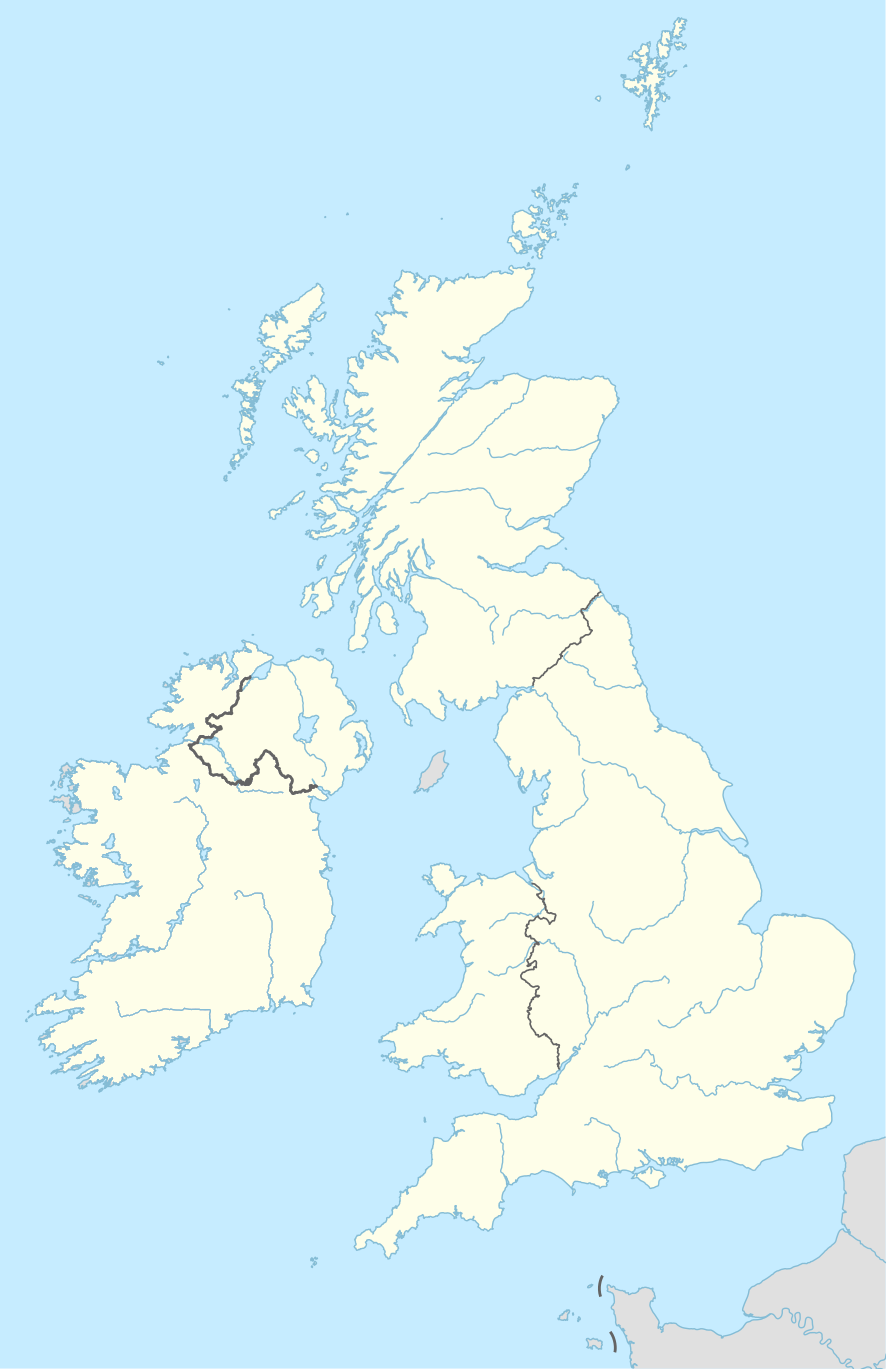
Locations of the 2022 NHL Division 2B teams.

=== Division 2B Table ===
Division final place Semi final place Relegation playoff place

Team	Pld	W	D	L	F	A	Diff	Pts
Derry	5	5	0	0	134	70	64	10
Donegal	5	4	0	1	107	84	23	8
Sligo	5	2	1	2	115	105	10	5
London	5	2	0	3	83	102	-19	4
Wicklow	5	0	2	3	88	124	-36	2
Mayo	5	0	1	4	86	128	-42	1

=== Division 2B Rounds 1 to 5 ===
==== Division 2B Round 1 ====
5 February 2022; 14:00; Round 1	Derry	2-14 - 1-14	Sligo	Celtic Park
5 February 2022; 14:00; Round 1	C O’Doherty 0-9f, G Bradley 1-1, T McHugh 1-0, M McGrath, D McGilligan, T McCloskey and D Foley 0-1 each.	Report	G O’Kelly-Lynch 1-12 (12f, 1-0 pen), A Kilcullen (0-2).	Celtic Park

6 February 2022; Round 1	Mayo	2-15 - 2-15	Wicklow	James Stephens Park
6 February 2022; Round 1	A Phillips (1-5), E Delaney (1-2); S Boland (0-5, 5f), K Higgins (0-1), S Kenny (0-1); A Ketterick (0-1).	Report	S Germaine (1-10, 4f, 1 65), J Toomey (1-0), M Lennon (0-2), A O’Brien (0-2), J Byrne (0-1).	James Stephens Park

6 February 2022; Round 1	Donegal	3-16- 0-08	London	O'Donnell Park
6 February 2022; Round 1	R Ryan (2-8, 7f), D Flynn (0-6), J Cronnolly-McGee (1-1), S McVeigh (0-1).	Report	F Collins and R Crowley (0-2), B McCarry (0-2f), D Hannon (0-1f), M O’Dwyer (0-1).	O'Donnell Park

==== Division 2B Round 2 ====
13 February 2022; Round 2	London	4-11 - 1-10	Mayo	McGovern Park; Referee: C McDonald (Antrim)
13 February 2022; Round 2	R Crowley 0-6, M Freaney 1-1, M Dwyer 1-0, B McCarry 1-0, C McCormack 1-0, J Goulding 0-2, R Lombard 0-2.		A Philips 0-6, S Boland 0-4, S Crinnigan 1-0.	McGovern Park; Referee: C McDonald (Antrim)

13 February 2022; Round 2	Wicklow	0-12 - 2-24	Derry	Aughrim County Ground; Referee: C Mooney (Dublin)
13 February 2022; Round 2	S Germaine (0-8, 6f, 1 65), S Cranley (0-2); J Toomey (0-1), M Lennon (0-1).	Report	C O’Doherty (0-8, 6f), O McKeever (1-2), R Mullan (1-0), T McGrath (0-2), S Kelly (0-2), J Mullan (0-2), J McGuigan (0-2); D Foley (0-2), C Kelly (0-1), D McGilligan (0-1); C Hendry (0-1), R Mulholland (0-1).	Aughrim County Ground; Referee: C Mooney (Dublin)

13 February 2022; Round 2	Sligo	2-14 - 1-19	Donegal	Markievicz Park; Referee: C Flynn (Westmeath)
13 February 2022; Round 2	G O’Kelly-Lynch (1-6, 4f), M Munnelly (1-0), A Kilcullen (0-2), K Gilmartin (0-2), G Connolly (0-1), R McHugh (0-1), J McHugh (0-1), K Prior (0-1f).	Report	R McDermott (1-3), R Ryan (0-6, 3f) D Flynn (0-6, 2f), C O’Grady (0-1), S McVeigh (0-1), D Coulter (0-1), G Gilmore (0-1).	Markievicz Park; Referee: C Flynn (Westmeath)

==== Division 2B Round 3 ====
27 February 2022; Round 3	Sligo	1-24 - 1-15	London	Connacht COE; Referee: B Keon (Galway)
27 February 2022; Round 3	G O’Kelly-Lynch (0-10, 9f 1’65), T Cawley (1-5), F Cawley (0-2), T O’Kelly-Lynch (0-2), R McHugh (0-1), F Moylan (0-1), J McHugh (0-1), A Kilcullen (0-1), E Rua McGowan (0-1).	Report	R Crowley (0-6, 3f 1’65), R Lombard (1-0), J Goulding (0-3), F O'Keeffe (0-2), B McCarry (0-2, 1f), M Dwyer (0-1), D Hannon (0-1, 1f).	Connacht COE; Referee: B Keon (Galway)

27 February 2022; Round 3	Wicklow	3-08 - 2-16	Donegal	Aughrim County Ground; Referee: J Owens (Wexford)
27 February 2022; Round 3	S Germaine 1-4, J Toomey 1-0, T Mulconry 1-0, J Doyle 0-2, K Conway 0-1, M Murphy 0-1.		D Flynn 0-10, B Lafferty 1-1, R McDermott 1-0, C O'Grady 0-2, D Ó Maoleidigh 0-2, G Gilmore 0-1.	Aughrim County Ground; Referee: J Owens (Wexford)

27 February 2022; Round 3	Derry	4-24 - 1-13	Mayo	Owenbeg COE; Referee: K Parke (Antrim)
27 February 2022; Round 3	D Foley 1-4, C O'Doherty 0-6, O McKeever 1-2, S Kelly 1-2, J Mullan 1-1, C Kelly 0-4, D McGilligan 0-2, M McGrath 0-1, F Bradley 0-1, C Hendry 0-1.		S Kenny 0-5, E Delaney 0-4, R Butler 1-0, K Higgins 0-2, C Murray 0-1, S Boland 0-1.	Owenbeg COE; Referee: K Parke (Antrim)

==== Division 2B Round 4 ====
6 March 2022; Round 4	London	3-16 - 1-9	Wicklow	McGovern Park, Ruislip; Referee: Caymon Flynn
6 March 2022; Round 4	F O’Keeffe (1-2), J Goulding (0-5); D Hannon (0-5, 3f), C Lordan (1-0), M Flannery (1-0), M Freaney (0-2), F Collins (0-1); F Byrne (0-1).	Report	S Germaine (0-7, 6f, 1’65), M Murphy (1-0), S Browne (0-1), E McCormack (0-1).	McGovern Park, Ruislip; Referee: Caymon Flynn

6 March 2022; Round 4	Donegal	0-15 - 0-23	Derry	Letterkenny; Referee: James Judge
6 March 2022; Round 4	D Flynn (0-6, 3f), D Coulter (0-5, 2f, 1 '65), R McDermott (0-1), D O'Maoleidigh (0-1), B McIntyre (0-1), G Gilmore (0-1)	Report	C O'Doherty (0-9, 9f), D McGilligan (0-3), J Mullan (0-3), B Óg McGilligan (0-2), O McKeever (0-2), D Foley (0-2), G Bradley (0-2)	Letterkenny; Referee: James Judge

6 March 2022; Round 4	Mayo	0-19 - 4-13	Sligo	Ballina; Referee: James Connors
6 March 2022; Round 4	S Boland (0-6 2f), K Higgins (0-4 1f), S Kenny (0-3 (1f); B Hunt (0-2), K Feeney (0-2), P Kirwan (0-1), D Kenny (0-1), C Hession (0-1).	Report	G O’Kelly-Lynch (1-5, 5f), T O’Kelly-Lynch (2-1), E Comerford (1-0), A Kilcullen (0-2), P Foley (0-2); F Cawley (0-1), J McHugh (0-1); T Cawley (0-1).	Ballina; Referee: James Connors

==== Division 2B Round 5 ====
20 March 2022; 12:00; Round 5	Derry	0-25 - 0-09	London	Celtic Park; Referee: C McDonald (Antrim)
20 March 2022; 12:00; Round 5	G Bradley (0-6), D Foley (0-5f), T McCloskey (0-3f), R Mulholland (0-3); D McGilligan (0-3); B Laverty (0-2), G Farren (0-1); J Mullan (0-1), T McHugh (0-1).	Report	M Feaneay (0-3), R Crowley (0-2f); D Hannon (0-1), J Goulding (0-1); D Bruen (0-1), B McCarry (0-1).	Celtic Park; Referee: C McDonald (Antrim)

20 March 2022; 13:00; Round 5	Wicklow	3-17 - 3-17	Sligo	Aughrim County Ground; Referee: K Brady (Louth)
20 March 2022; 13:00; Round 5	J Doyle (0-9, 6f); K Conway (2-1), J Toomey (1-0); M Murphy (0-2), S Browne (0-1), S Germaine (0-1f), J Byrne (0-1); T Collins (0-1); E Kavanagh (0-1).	Report	A Kilcullen (1-10, 4F, 1 65), F Cawley (1-1), G O’Kelly-Lynch (1-0), T Cawley (0-2), R McHugh (0-2, 1f), R Brennan (0-1), C Hanniffy (0-1).	Aughrim County Ground; Referee: K Brady (Louth)

20 March 2022; 13:00; Round 5	Mayo	1-13 - 2-17	Donegal	Ballina; Referee: B McKeon (Galway)
20 March 2022; 13:00; Round 5	S Kenny (1-5f, pen); K Higgins (0-3, 2f), M Phillips (0-2); B Hunt (0-2), E Roe (0-1).	Report	D Flynn (1-9, 6f), B Lafferty (1-2), G Gilmore (0-4); D Coulter (0-1), C O’Grady (0-1).	Ballina; Referee: B McKeon (Galway)

=== Division 2B Semi-final ===
26 March 2022; Semi-final	Donegal	1-19 - 1-20	Sligo	O'Donnell Park; Referee: K Parke (Antrim)
26 March 2022; Semi-final	D Flynn (0-8f), D O Maoileidigh (1-3), B Lafferty (0-2), R McDermott (0-2), D Cullen (0-2), B McIntyre (0-1); S McVeigh (0-1).	Report	A Kilcullen (1-6, 4f) T Cawley (0-2), T O’Kelly-Lynch (0-2), R McHugh (0-2), K Gilmartin (0-2); J McHugh (0-2), C Hanniffy (0-2), G O’Kelly-Lynch (0-1), R Brennan (0-1).	O'Donnell Park; Referee: K Parke (Antrim)

=== Division 2B Final ===
2 April 2022; Final	Derry	1-23 - 2-15	Sligo	St Joseph's Park; Referee: C Cunning (Antrim)
2 April 2022; Final	C O’Doherty (0-8f), O McKeeer (1-4) F Bradley (0-3), J Mullan (0-2), G Bradley (0-2), C Kelly (0-2), B Óg McGilligan (0-1); D Foley (0-1).	Report	A Kilcullen (0-6f), J McHugh (1-2), N Feehily (1-0); C Hannify (0-3), F Cawley (0-1), R McHugh (0-1), G O’Kelly-Lynch (0-1).	St Joseph's Park; Referee: C Cunning (Antrim)

=== Division 2B relegation play-off ===
26 March 2022; Playoff	Wicklow	0-16 - 0-15	Mayo	Bord na Móna O'Connor Park; Referee: C Flynn (Westmeath)
26 March 2022; Playoff	J Doyle 0-8, M Murphy 0-3, B Ryan 0-2, K Conway 0-1, J Toomey 0-1, M O'Brien 0-1.		S Kenny 0-4, K Higgins 0-2, B Hunt 0-2, E Delaney 0-2, A Philips 0-2, K Gallagher 0-2, S Boland 0-1.	Bord na Móna O'Connor Park; Referee: C Flynn (Westmeath)

=== Division 2B scoring statistics ===
Top scorers overall

Rank	Player	Team	Tally	Total	Matches	Average
1	Davin Flynn	Donegal	1-45	48	6	8.00
2	Gerard O'Kelly-Lynch	Sligo	4-35	47	7	6.71
3	Cormac O'Doherty	Derry	0-40	40	5	8.00
4	Seánie Germaine	Wicklow	2-30	36	5	7.20
5	Andrew Kilcullen	Sligo	2-29	35	7	5.00
6	Seán Kenny	Mayo	1-18	21	6	3.50
7	Richie Ryan	Donegal	2-14	20	2	10.00
8	Odhran McKeever	Derry	3-10	19	4	4.75
8	John Doyle	Wicklow	0-19	19	6	3.16
10	Shane Boland	Mayo	0-17	17	5	3.40

Top scorers in a single game

Rank	Player	Team	Tally	Total	Opposition
1	Gerard O'Kelly-Lynch	Sligo	1-12	15	Derry
2	Richie Ryan	Donegal	2-08	14	London
3	Seánie Germaine	Wicklow	1-10	13	Mayo
3	Andrew Kilcullen	Sligo	1-10	13	Wicklow
5	Davin Flynn	Donegal	1-09	12	Mayo
6	Gerard O'Kelly-Lynch	Sligo	0-10	10	London
6	Davin Flynn	Donegal	0-10	10	Wicklow
8	Gerard O'Kelly-Lynch	Sligo	1-06	9	Donegal
8	Andrew Kilcullen	Sligo	1-06	9	Donegal
8	Cormac O'Doherty	Derry	0-09	9	Sligo
8	John Doyle	Wicklow	0-09	9	Sligo

== Division 3A ==
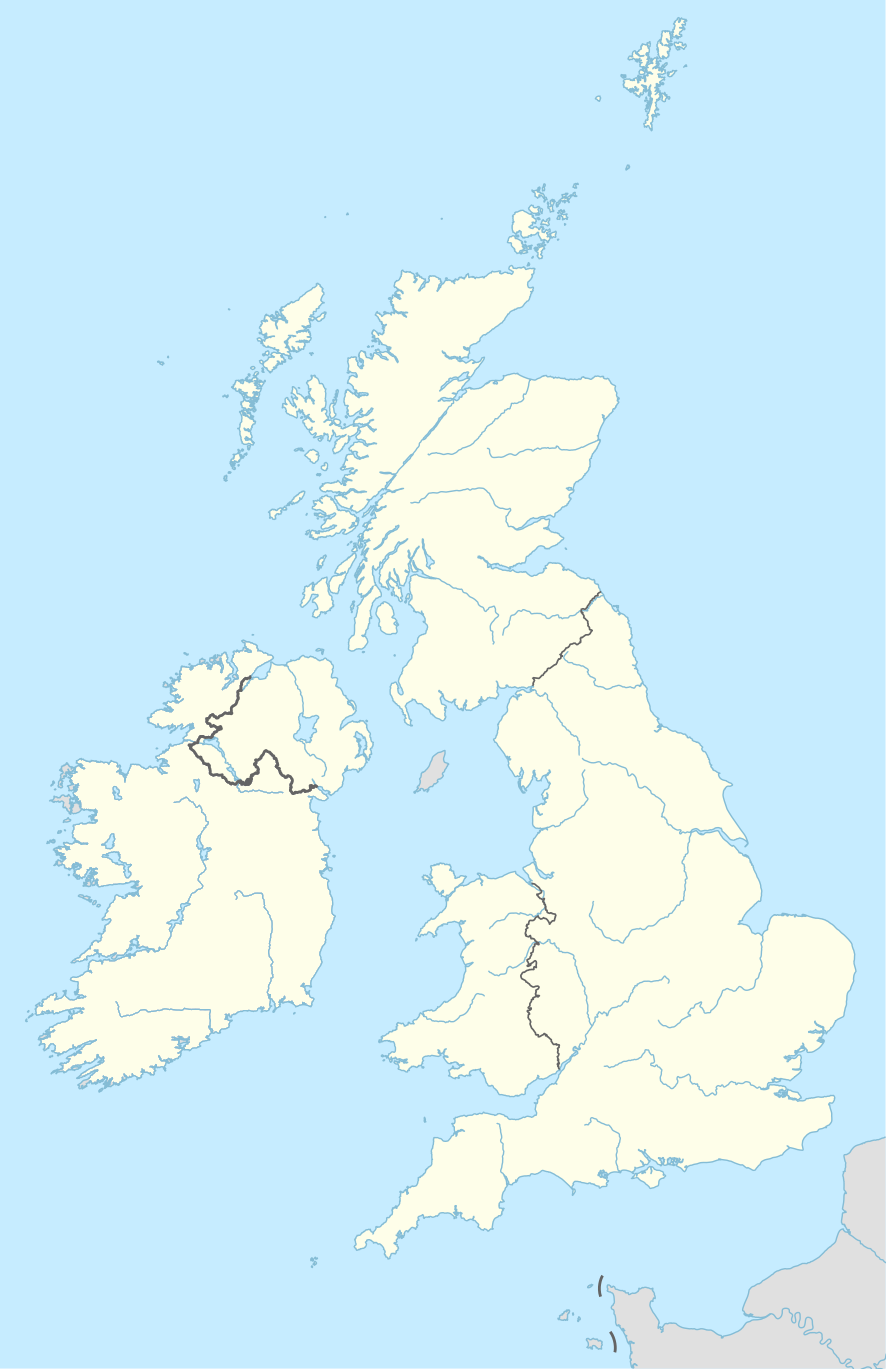
Locations of the 2022 NHL Division 3A teams.

=== Division 3A Table ===
Division final place Semi final place Automatic relegation to Division 3B

Team	Pld	W	D	L	F	A	Diff	Pts
Tyrone	5	4	1	0	136	77	59	9
Roscommon	5	4	1	0	132	80	52	9
Armagh	5	3	0	2	128	102	26	6
Monaghan	5	2	0	3	74	108	-34	4
Louth	5	0	1	4	83	110	-27	1
Warwickshire	5	0	1	4	67	143	-76	1

=== Division 3A Rounds 1 to 5 ===
==== Division 3A Round 1 ====
5 February 2022; Round 1	Armagh	2-16 - 3-12	Louth	Athletic Grounds
5 February 2022; Round 1	D Gaffney 0-10 (9f), E McGuinness 2-1, F Donnelly 0-2 (1f); P McBride 0-1, O Curry 0-1; T O’Neill 0-1.	Report	D Geoghegan 0-9 (7f), C Deane 1-1 (0-1s), P Mathews 1-1, M Gahan 1-0, F Joyce 0-1.	Athletic Grounds

6 February 2022; Round 1	Warwickshire	2-08 - 1-12	Monaghan	Páirc na hÉireann
6 February 2022; Round 1	P Crehan 1-5, L Hand 1-1, N Eames 0-1, K Magee 0-1.		C Merrick 1-0, N Garland 0-3, J Slevin 0-3, C Guinan 0-2, H Byrne 0-1, C Flynn 0-1, P Malone 0-1, P Finnegan 0-1.	Páirc na hÉireann

6 February 2022; Round 1	Roscommon	0-20 - 1-17	Tyrone	Dr. Hyde Park
6 February 2022; Round 1	C Dolan 0-10, MJ Egan 0-3, E Fitzgerald 0-3, P Kelly 0-1, E Costello 0-1, D Glynn 0-1, B Mulry 0-1.		D Casey 0-12, CJ McGourty 1-2, B McGurk 0-1, C Grogan 0-1, D Begley 0-1.	Dr. Hyde Park

==== Division 3A Round 2 ====
13 February 2022; Round 2	Tyrone	4-29 - 0-07	Warwickshire	O'Neill's Healy Park
13 February 2022; Round 2	D Casey 0-10, A Kelly 2-2, D Begley 0-6, B McGurk 1-2, C Grogan 0-3, C McNally 0-3, R Weir 1-1, A Crossan 0-1, C Kearns 0-1.		K McGee 0-3, L Hands 0-3, C Monaghan 0-1.	O'Neill's Healy Park

13 February 2022; Round 2	Louth	0-14 - 2-21	Roscommon	St. Brigid's Park
13 February 2022; Round 2	D Geoghegan 0-8 (6f), C Deane 0-2, F Joyce 0-1, P Mathews 0-1, N Keenan 0-1; M Gahan 0-1.	Report	C Dolan 0-9 (6f); E Fitzgerald 1-3, MJ Egan 1-2, B Mulry 0-2, D Glynn 0-2, B McGahan 0-2, P Kelly 0-1.	St. Brigid's Park

13 February 2022; Round 2	Monaghan	0-13 - 4-22	Armagh	Grattan Park
13 February 2022; Round 2	C Gernon 0-4, P McKenna 0-3, N Garland 0-2, D Hughes 0-2, C McNally 0-1, C Guinan 0-1.		D Gaffney 1-8, R Gaffney 1-2, E McGuinness 1-1, T O'Neill 1-0, D Magee 0-3, N Curry 0-3, O Curry 0-2, P McBride 0-1, S Toal 0-1, F Donnelly 0-1.	Grattan Park

==== Division 3A Round 3 ====
26 February 2022; Round 3	Louth	0-07 - 2-08	Monaghan	Darver COE; Referee: C McDonald (Antrim)
26 February 2022; Round 3	S Kerrisk 0-2, J McDonnell 0-2, F Joyce 0-1, D Geoghegan 0-1, M Gahan 0-1.		T Hughes 1-1, L McKenna 0-4, P McKenna 1-0, M Treanor 0-1, F Rafter 0-1, C Flynn 0-1.	Darver COE; Referee: C McDonald (Antrim)

27 February 2022; Round 3	Roscommon	4-20 - 0-06	Warwickshire	St Brigid's GAA Grounds
27 February 2022; Round 3	C Dolan 1-8, B Mulry 2-0, C Cosgrove 1-3, D Glynn 0-5, MJ Egan 0-2, E Mulry 0-1, B McGahon 0-1.			St Brigid's GAA Grounds

27 February 2022; Round 3	Tyrone	2-21 - 1-14	Armagh	O'Neill's Healy Park
27 February 2022; Round 3	D Casey 0-13, CJ McGourty 1-2, R Weir 1-1, C Grogan 0-2, C Kearns 0-1, C McNally 0-1, A Kelly 0-1.		J Shortt 1-2, F Donnelly 0-4, D Gaffney 0-3, E McGuinness 0-3, R Gaffney 0-1, O Curry 0-1.	O'Neill's Healy Park

==== Division 3A Round 4 ====
5 March 2022; Round 4	Warwickshire	3-13 - 1-19	Louth	Páirc na hÉireann; Referee: K Parke (Antrim)
5 March 2022; Round 4	J Collins (2-5, 1-4 frees), K McGee (1-2); R Horan (0-2); C Dineen (0-2), P Crehan (0-1), N Eames (0-1).	Report	S Kerrisk (0-5, 0-4 frees), C Deane (0-3), N Keenan (0-3); P Mathews (1-2), A Smyth (0-1); C Quigley (0-1), J McDonnell (0-1 free); S Crosbie (0-1), S Conneely (0-1), A Mackin (0-1).	Páirc na hÉireann; Referee: K Parke (Antrim)

6 March 2022; Round 4	Armagh	1-19 - 2-17	Roscommon	Athletic Grounds
6 March 2022; Round 4	F Donnelly 0-15 (15f), D Gaffney 1-1, N Curry 0-1, R Gaffney 0-1, D Magee 0-1.	Report	C Dolan 0-11, B Mulry 1-2, MJ Egan 1-1, P Kelly 0-2, E Fitzgerald 0-1.	Athletic Grounds

6 March 2022; Round 4	Monaghan	1-11 - 3-14	Tyrone	Grattan Park
6 March 2022; Round 4	F Rafter 1-2, H Byrne 0-4, D Hughes 0-3, C Gernon 0-2.		D Casey 1-2, T Murphy 1-2, C Lagan 1-0, C Grogan 0-3, B McGurk 0-2, L Devlin 0-1, C Kearns 0-1, A Crossan 0-1, D Begley 0-1, C McNally 0-1.	Grattan Park

==== Division 3A Round 5 ====
20 March 2022; Round 5	Roscommon	2-24 - 1-15	Monaghan	Dr Hyde Park

20 March 2022; Round 5	Tyrone	3-16 - 2-13	Louth	O'Neill's Healy Park; Referee: J Judge (Mayo)
20 March 2022; Round 5	D Casey 1-10, T Murphy 2-3, CJ McGourty 0-2, C Kearns 0-1.		M Gahan 1-6, S Kerrisk 0-4, G Hall 1-0, C Deane 0-2, C Quigley 0-1.	O'Neill's Healy Park; Referee: J Judge (Mayo)

20 March 2022; Round 5	Warwickshire	0-18 - 5-18	Armagh	Páirc na hÉireann
20 March 2022; Round 5			D Magee 3-2, N Curry 1-4, F Donnelly 0-7, E McGuinness 1-0, S Harvey 0-2, S Toal 0-1, T O'Neill 0-1.	Páirc na hÉireann

=== Division 3A Semi-final ===
26 March 2022; Semi-final	Roscommon	0-20 - 1-22	Armagh	Dr Hyde Park
26 March 2022; Semi-final		Report		Dr Hyde Park

=== Division 3A Final ===
2 April 2022; Final	Tyrone	2-21 - 2-19	Armagh	Derry COE; Referee: C Flynn (Westmeath)
2 April 2022; Final	D Casey (1-10, 0-9fs), CJ McGourty (1-01), T Murphy (0-04), R Devlin (0-01), C Kearns (0-01), D Begley (0-01), L Devlin (0-01), R Slane (0-01),	Report	D Gaffney (1-04, 0-02fs), N Curry (1-03), F Donnelly (0-05, 0-04fs), S Harvey (0-03), S Renaghan (0-02), P McBride (0-01), S Toal (0-01).	Derry COE; Referee: C Flynn (Westmeath)

=== Division 3A scoring statistics ===
Top scorers overall

Rank	Player	Team	Tally	Total	Matches	Average
1	Cathal Dolan	Roscommon	1-38	41	4	10.25
2	Damian Casey	Tyrone	1-37	40	4	10.00
3	Dean Gaffney	Armagh	2-22	28	4	7.00
4	Fionntan Donnelly	Armagh	0-22	22	4	5.50
5	Darren Geoghegan	Louth	0-18	18	3	6.00

Top scorers in a single game

Rank	Player	Team	Tally	Total	Opposition
1	Fionntan Donnelly	Armagh	0-15	15	Roscommon
2	Damian Casey	Tyrone	0-13	13	Armagh
3	Damian Casey	Tyrone	0-12	12	Roscommon
4	John Collins	Warwickshire	2-05	11	Louth
4	Dean Gaffney	Armagh	1-08	11	Monaghan
4	Cathal Dolan	Roscommon	1-08	11	Warwickshire
4	Cathal Dolan	Roscommon	0-11	11	Armagh
8	Dean Gaffney	Armagh	0-10	10	Louth
8	Cathal Dolan	Roscommon	0-10	10	Tyrone
8	Damian Casey	Tyrone	0-10	10	Warwickshire

== Division 3B ==
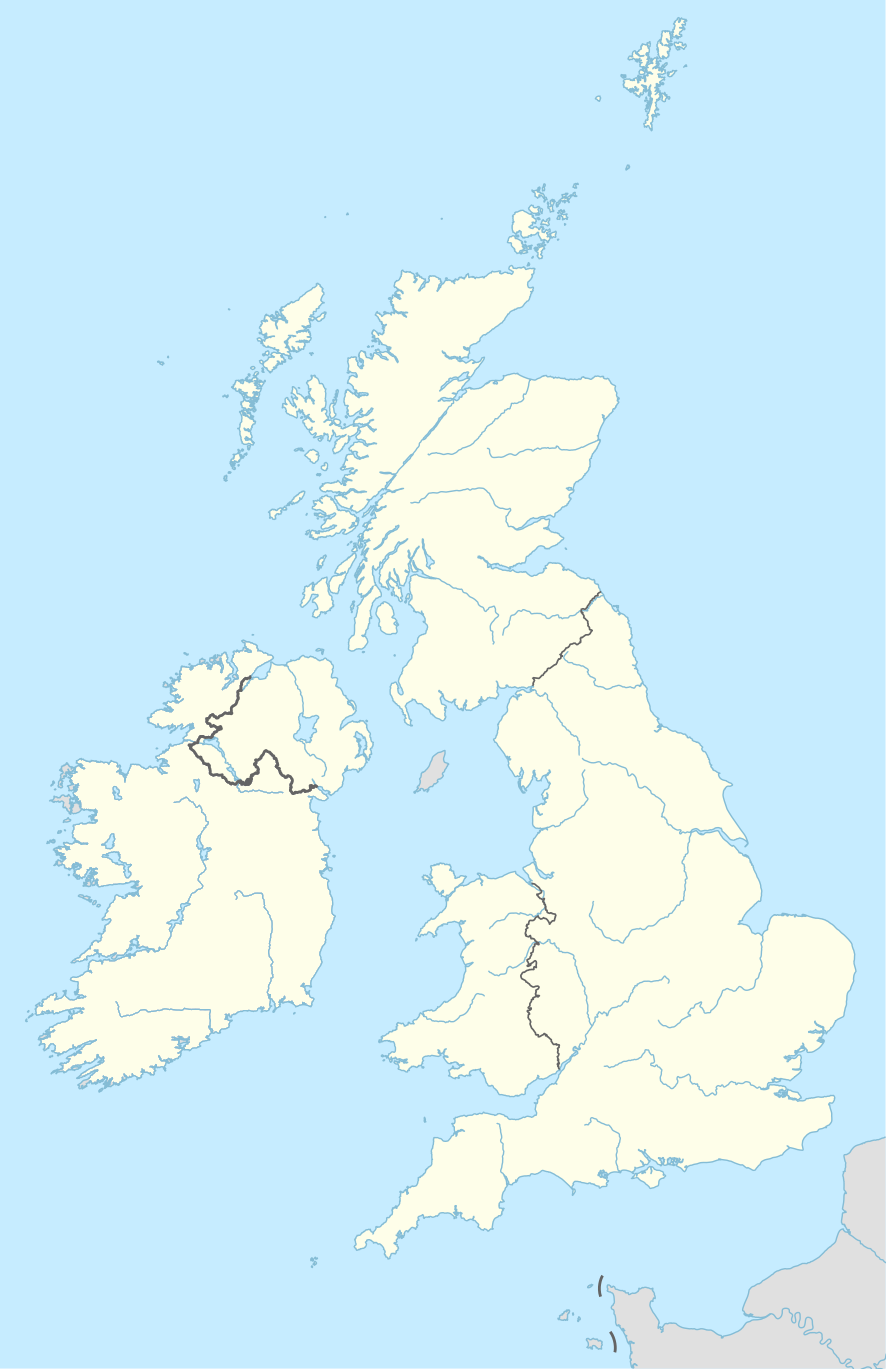
Locations of the 2022 NHL Division 3B teams.

=== Division 3B Table ===
Division final place Semi final place

Team	Pld	W	D	L	F	A	Diff	Pts
Fermanagh	4	4	0	0	85	52	33	8
Longford	4	3	0	1	78	59	19	6
Leitrim	4	2	0	2	80	62	18	4
Lancashire	4	1	0	3	66	97	-31	2
Cavan	4	0	0	4	43	82	-39	0

=== Division 3B Rounds 1 to 5 ===
==== Division 3B Round 1 ====
5 February 2022; Round 1	Fermanagh	1-20 - 0-13	Cavan	Brewster Park
5 February 2022; Round 1	S Corrigan 0-6, R Bogue 0-4, F McBrien 1-0, C McShea 0-2, L McCusker 0-2, T Keenan 0-2, D Teague 0-2, S Curran 0-1, C Duffy 0-1.		J Smith 0-12, F Hughes 0-1.	Brewster Park

6 February 2022; Round 1	Leitrim	4-16 - 2-08	Lancashire	Abbottstown
6 February 2022; Round 1	G O'Hagan 0-11, 7f; J McNabola 2-1; D Kelleher & M Feeney 1-0 each; J Murray 0-2, C Hackett & K McDermott (f) 0-1 each.	Report	D Power 1-2 f; J McAllister 1-1; D Burke 0-3; D Connolly 0-2.	Abbottstown

==== Division 3B Round 2 ====
13 February 2022; Round 2	Cavan	0-12 - 0-23	Lancashire	Kingspan Breffni Park
13 February 2022; Round 2	D Carney 0-5, A Sheridan 0-3, E Hill 0-2, J Smith 0-2.		D Connolly 0-12, J McAllister 0-3, K Fennelly 0-3, D Burke 0-3, M Morgan 0-1, E Kelly 0-1.	Kingspan Breffni Park

13 February 2022; Round 2	Longford	0-11 - 1-10	Fermanagh	Glennon Brothers Pearse Park
13 February 2022; Round 2	J O'Brien 0-5, P Lynam 0-2, E Corrigan 0-1, K Murray 0-1, C Kavanagh 0-1, J Mulhern 0-1.		J Duffy 0-5, D Teague 1-0, S Corrigan 0-2, JP McGarry 0-1, R Bogue 0-1, T Keenan 0-1.	Glennon Brothers Pearse Park

==== Division 3B Round 3 ====
26 February 2022; Round 3	Leitrim	1-13 - 0-09	Cavan	Abbottstown; Referee: J Judge
26 February 2022; Round 3	G O'Hagan 0-4, J McNabola 1-0, K McDermott 0-3, S Markham 0-2, M Feeney 0-2, D Kelleher 0-1, G O'Brien 0-1.		J Smith 0-4, F Hughes 0-3, C Bannon 0-1, D Carney 0-1.	Abbottstown; Referee: J Judge

27 February 2022; Round 3	Longford	1-26 - 3-11	Lancashire	Abbottstown; Referee: L Gordon (Galway)
27 February 2022; Round 3	J O'Brien 0-11, E Corrigan 1-2, P Lynam 0-5, C Mullane 0-3, C Kavanagh 0-2, K Murray 0-1, R Murray 0-1, J Mulhern 0-1.		D Power 0-6, S Holland 1-2, T Lee 1-1, J Cleere 1-0, M Morgan 0-1, J McAllister 0-1.	Abbottstown; Referee: L Gordon (Galway)

==== Division 3B Round 4 ====
6 March 2022; Round 4	Fermanagh	2-22 - 0-09	Lancashire	Darver COE
6 March 2022; Round 4	D Teague 0-6, L McCusker 0-5, T Keenan 0-4, S Corrigan 0-4, E Cleary 1-0, C McShea 1-0, R Bogue 0-1, U O'Reilly 0-1, S Curran 0-1.		D Connolly 0-4, D Power 0-2, M Morgan 0-1, S Wallace 0-1, J Bailey 0-1.	Darver COE

6 March 2022; Round 4	Longford	1-15 - 1-14	Leitrim	Glennon Brothers Pearse Park
6 March 2022; Round 4	J O’Brien 0-7, 3f; P Lynam 0-4, 3f; C Mullane 1-1; K Murray, E Corrigan & R Murray 0-1 each	Report	J Murray (2f) & G O’Hagan (3f) 0-4 each; D Kelleher 1-0; M Feeney & S Markham 0-2 each; B Delaney & L Moreton 0-1 each.	Glennon Brothers Pearse Park

==== Division 3B Round 5 ====
19 March 2022; Round 5	Cavan	0-09 - 2-14	Longford	Kingspan Breffni Park; Referee: C Flynn (Westmeath)
19 March 2022; Round 5	J Smith 0-6, F Hughes 0-2, A Sheridan 0-1.		P Lynam 0-5, E Corrigan 1-1, J Casey 1-0, R Murray 0-3, C Mullane 0-2, A Quinn 0-1, E Tully 0-1, J Mulhern 0-1.	Kingspan Breffni Park; Referee: C Flynn (Westmeath)

20 March 2022; Round 5	Leitrim	1-16 - 2-15	Fermanagh	Avant Money Páirc Seán Mac Diarmada; Referee: A McAleer (Donegal)
20 March 2022; Round 5	J Murray 1-11, C O'Donovan 0-1, K McDermott 0-1, M Feeney 0-1, T Brannigan 0-1, B Delaney 0-1.		S Corrigan 1-4, D Teague 0-6, L McCusker 1-1, R Bogue 0-2, JP McGarry 0-1, B Corrigan 0-1.	Avant Money Páirc Seán Mac Diarmada; Referee: A McAleer (Donegal)

=== Division 3B Semi-final ===
26 March 2022; Semi-final	Longford	1-26 - 2-13	Leitrim	Glennon Brothers Pearse Park; Referee: J Clarke (Cavan)
26 March 2022; Semi-final	P Lynam 0-8, J O'Brien 0-6, E Corrigan 1-1, R Murray 0-4, C Mullane 0-2, C Kavanagh 0-2, K Murray 0-1, A Quinn 0-1.	Report	J Murray 1-4, G O'Hagan 0-4, J McNabola 1-0, S Markham 0-3, S Keane 0-1, D Kelleher 0-1.	Glennon Brothers Pearse Park; Referee: J Clarke (Cavan)

=== Division 3B Final ===
2 April 2022; Final	Fermanagh	2-18 - 1-17	Longford	Avant Money Pairc Sean Mac Diarmada; Referee: T Conway (Derry)
2 April 2022; Final	S Corrigan (0-7, four frees), L McCusker (1-1), T Keenan (0-4); S Curran (1-0), C Duffy (0-3), R Bogue (0-2, frees), C McShea (0-1).	Report	J O’Brien (1-6, five frees), P Lynam (0-4, three frees); E Corrigan (0-4), C Mullane (0-1), D Buckley (0-1), J Casey (0-1).	Avant Money Pairc Sean Mac Diarmada; Referee: T Conway (Derry)

=== Division 3B scoring statistics ===
Top scorers overall

Rank	Player	Team	Tally	Total	Matches	Average
1	Joe O'Brien	Longford	1-35	38	5	7.60
2	Paddy Lynam	Longford	0-28	28	6	4.66
3	Joe Murray	Leitrim	2-21	27	5	5.40
4	Seán Corrigan	Fermanagh	1-23	26	5	5.20
5	James Smith	Cavan	0-24	24	4	6.00
6	Gavin O'Hagan	Leitrim	0-23	23	5	4.60
7	Emmet Corrigan	Longford	3-10	19	6	3.16
8	Danny Connolly	Lancashire	0-18	18	3	6.00
9	Daniel Teague	Fermanagh	1-14	17	4	4.25
10	Luca McCusker	Fermanagh	2-10	16	5	3.20

Top scorers in a single game

Rank	Player	Team	Tally	Total	Opposition
1	Joe Murray	Leitrim	1-11	14	Fermanagh
2	James Smith	Cavan	0-12	12	Fermanagh
2	Danny Connolly	Lancashire	0-12	12	Cavan
4	Gavin O'Hagan	Leitrim	0-11	11	Lancashire
4	Joe O'Brien	Longford	0-11	11	Lancashire
6	Joe O'Brien	Longford	1-06	9	Fermanagh
7	Paddy Lynam	Longford	0-08	8	Leitrim
8	James McNabola	Leitrim	2-01	7	Lancashire
8	Joe Murray	Leitrim	1-04	7	Longford
8	Seán Corriagn	Fermanagh	1-04	7	Leitrim
8	Joe O'Brien	Longford	0-07	7	Leitrim
8	Seán Corriagn	Fermanagh	0-07	7	Longford
