= Naomh Eoin GAA (Sligo) =

Naomh Eoin
- Naomh Eoin
- Founded: 1984
- County: Sligo
- Colours: Black and red
- Grounds: Dick Kent Park

Playing kits
Standard colours

Senior Club Championships
	All Ireland	Connacht champions	Sligo champions
Hurling:	0	0	2

Naomh Eoin GAA is a Gaelic Athletic Association club located in Sligo, Ireland. The club is primarily concerned with the game of hurling.

== History ==
Located in Sligo, Naomh Eoin GAA Club was founded in 1984. Throughout their existence, the club has been overshadowed by their more successful Sligo town neighbours; firstly by Craobh Rua throughout the 1980s and 1990s, and then by Calry-St Joseph's who won 11 Sligo SHC title from 15 final appearances between 2002 and 2017. On the outskirts of town, the Coolera/Strandhill club also won a Sligo SHC title in 2018.

Naomh Eoin were only two years in existence when they appeared in their first county final. Beaten by Tourlestrane on that occasion, the club suffered further county final defeats in 1997 and 2018. The Sligo SHL title was annexed in 1990, before Naomh Eoin won their first Sligo SHC title in 2019 after a defeat of Easkey in the final.

== Honours ==
- Sligo Senior Hurling Championship (1): 2019, 2026

== Notable players ==
- Gerard O'Kelly-Lynch: Lory Meagher Cup-winner (2018) and Nicky Rackard Cup-winner (2019)
