= Daithí Hand =

Daithí Hand is a hurling manager and hurling coach. A former manager of Sligo, he is that county's most successful in its history.

Hand led Sligo to consecutive All-Ireland titles in 2018 and 2019. Sligo first won the 2018 Lory Meagher Cup. The county was promoted to the Nicky Rackard Cup as a result. Sligo then won the 2019 Nicky Rackard Cup, achieving promotion to the Christy Ring Cup.

However, Hand and fellow management team member Peter Galvin tendered their resignations on the evening of 14 September 2020, less than one month before the team was scheduled to contest a National Hurling League final and make its debut in the Christy Ring Cup. Confusion over efforts to register two players from Galway with Sligo heritage and the involvement of one of their coaches with a club, unbeknownst to Hand and Galvin, were cited as partly contributing to this unexpected decision. The county board did not report their departures until 20 September. The coach, later named as Colum O'Meara, then applied (unsuccessfully) to become Hand's successor; O'Meara, a native of Killimor, County Galway, had joined the Sligo set-up as coach ahead of the 2019 season after parting ways with Longford.
