= Paddy Delaney =

Irish hurler

Personal information
- Born: 1997 (age 28–29) Kinnitty, County Offaly, Ireland
- Occupation: Engineer

Sport
- Sport: Hurling
- Position: Right corner-back
Club
- Years: Club
- Kinnitty
Club titles
- Offaly titles: 0
College
- Years: College
- 2017–2020: Limerick Institute of Technology
College titles
- Fitzgibbon titles: 0
Inter-county
- Years: County
- 2017-present: Offaly
Inter-county titles
- Leinster titles: 0
- All-Irelands: 0
- NHL: 0
- All Stars: 0

Patrick Delaney (born 1997) is an Irish hurler who plays for Offaly Championship club Kinnitty and at inter-county level with the Offaly senior hurling team. He usually lines out as a corner-back.

== Career ==
Born in Kinnitty, County Offaly, Delaney first came to hurling prominence at juvenile and underage levels with the Kinnitty club before eventually progressing onto the club's senior team. He first appeared on the inter-county scene during a two-year stint with the Offaly minor team before a three-year tenure with the under-21 side. Delaney made his first appearance with the Offaly senior hurling team during the 2017 National League. He secured his first silverware during the 2021 season, when Offaly claimed the National League Division 2A and Christy Ring Cup titles.

== Honours ==
Offaly

- Christy Ring Cup: 2021
- National Hurling League Division 2A: 2021
