= Keith Raymond =

Irish hurler

Personal information
- Native name: Ceiteach Réamann (Irish)
- Born: 1987 (age 38–39) Sligo, Ireland
- Occupation: Secondary school teacher

Sport
- Sport: Hurling
- Position: Centre-back
Club
- Years: Club
- Calry/St. Joseph's
Club titles
- Sligo titles: 11
College
- Years: College
- Sligo Institute of Technology
Inter-county
- Years: County
- 2003-present: Sligo
Inter-county titles
- NHL: 2

Keith Raymond (born 1987) is an Irish hurler who plays as a centre-back for the Sligo senior team.

Born in Sligo, Raymond first played competitive hurling at juvenile and underage levels with the Calry/St. Joseph's club. He later joined the club's senior team and has experienced much success, including four Connacht medals. Raymond has also won eleven county championship medals.

Raymond was just fifteen years old when he made his debut with the Sligo senior team during the 2003 league. He subsequently became a regular member of the team and has won one Nicky Rackard Cup medal and two National Hurling League medals in different divisions.

== Honours ==
Calry/St Joseph's

- Connacht Junior Club Hurling Championship (4): 2009, 2012, 2013, 2016
- Sligo Senior Hurling Championship (11): 2005, 2007, 2008, 2009, 2011, 2012, 2013, 2014, 2015, 2016, 2017

Sligo

- Lory Meagher Cup (1): 2018
- Nicky Rackard Cup (1): 2008
- National Hurling League Division 3 (1): 2004
- National Hurling League Division 4 (1): 2009
