= Paul Seevers =

Irish hurler and Gaelic footballer

Paul Severs
Personal information
- Born: 1969 (age 56–57) Sligo, Ireland

Sport
- Sport: Hurling
Club
- Years: Club
- Tubbercurry
Club titles
- Sligo titles: 10 Hurling, 1 Football
Inter-county
- Years: County
- 1980s – 2000s: Sligo

Paul Seevers (born 1969) is a hurler from County Sligo, Ireland. He played with the Sligo county team from more than 20 years. He helped the Sligo team to a National Hurling League Division 3 victory in 2004, scoring 2–07 in the final and won a Nicky Rackard Cup in 2008 when Sligo overcame favourites Louth in the final in Croke Park by 3–19 to 3–10, he scored 1–04 in that game and 2–30 over the course of the championship. He also won 3 Railway Cup medals with Connacht. He plays with the Tubbercurry club in Sligo. He represented Ireland in the Shinty International against Scotland in 2003. He won 10 Sligo Senior Hurling Championships winning 9 in a row from 1995 to 2004 and once again in 2006. He also won a Sligo Senior Football Championship in 1991.
