= 2008 Nicky Rackard Cup =

- Dates: 28 June — 3 August
- Teams: 12
- Champions: Sligo (1st title); Damien Burke (captain); Michael Galvin (manager)
- Runners-up: Louth
- Relegated: 8 counties

Tournament statistics
- Matches played: 19

The 2008 Nicky Rackard Cup was the 4th annual third tier hurling competition organised by the Gaelic Athletic Association. Sligo beat Louth in the final.

== Team changes ==
=== To Championship ===
Entered Championship

- Fingal
- South Down

=== From Championship ===
Promoted to the Christy Ring Cup

- Armagh
- Roscommon

== Format ==
Ten county teams participated in the 2008 Nicky Rackard Cup, with Fingal (north Dublin) and "South Down" (Down excluding the Ards Peninsula) bringing the total to twelve.

- Group 3A: Fingal, Longford, Louth
- Group 3B: Fermanagh, Leitrim, South Down
- Group 3C: Donegal, Monaghan, Tyrone
- Group 3D: Cavan, Sligo, Warwickshire

Each team in the group played each other once in the first phase. The top two teams in each group advanced to the quarter-finals.

== Group A ==
Pos	Team	P	W	D	L	SF	SA	Diff	Pts	Qualification
1	Fingal	2	1	0	1	3-29	4-20	+6	2	Advance to Knockout Stage
2	Louth	2	1	0	1	1-26	0-29	0	2	Advance to Knockout Stage
3	Longford	2	1	0	1	3-22	3-28	-6	2	

Date	Team	Score	Team	Score
28 June	Louth	1-13	Fingal	0-14
5 July	Fingal	3-15	Longford	3-07
12 July	Longford	0-15	Louth	0-13

== Group B ==
Pos	Team	P	W	D	L	SF	SA	Diff	Pts	Qualification
1	South Down	2	2	0	0	7-31	4-29	+11	4	Advance to Knockout Stage
2	Leitrim	2	1	0	1	4-29	4-27	+2	2	Advance to Knockout Stage
3	Fermanagh	2	0	0	2	3-24	6-28	-13	0	

Date	Team	Score	Team	Score
28 June	South Down	3-16	Leitrim	2-16
5 July	Leitrim	2-13	Fermanagh	1-11
12 July	Fermanagh	2-13	South Down	4-15

== Group 3C ==
Date	Team	Score	Team	Score
28 June	Donegal	2-11	Tyrone	2-12
5 July	Tyrone	3-08	Monaghan	3-13
12 July	Monaghan	0-19	Donegal	1-15

Team	P	W	D	L	F	A	Pts	+/-
Monaghan	2	2	0	0	3-32	4-23	4	+6
Tyrone	2	1	0	1	5-20	5-24	2	-4
Donegal	2	0	0	2	3-26	2-31	0	-2

== Group 3D ==
Date	Team	Score	Team	Score
28 June	Sligo	3-15	Cavan	1-12
5 July	Cavan	0-16	Warwickshire	0-12
12 July	Warwickshire	2-10	Sligo	1-15

Team	P	W	D	L	F	A	Pts	+/-
Sligo	2	2	0	0	4-30	3-17	4	+16
Cavan	2	1	0	1	1-23	3-27	2	-10
Warwickshire	2	0	0	2	2-22	1-31	0	-6

== Knockout stage ==
=== Bracket ===
Quarter-Finals
1C	Monaghan	1-11
2D	Cavan	0-09
1B	South Down	2-16
2A	Louth	4-13
1D	Sligo	2-15
2C	Tyrone	2-11
1A	Fingal	1-19
2B	Leitrim	0-12

Semi-Finals
1C	Monaghan	1-13
2A	Louth	0-18
1D	Sligo	1-16
1A	Fingal	0-11

Final
2A	Louth	3-10
1D	Sligo	3-19

=== Final ===
3 August 2008
12pm

Sligo	3-19 (28) – (19) 3-10	Louth
(HT: 2-12 – 2-05)
Gls: Bannerton, Raymond, Seevers (1-0 each); Pts: Raymond (0-8), Seevers (0-4, 3f), D. Burke (0-2), Bannerton, M. Burke, Cadden, Gilmartin, Shelly (0-1 each)		Gls: Byrne, Conroy, Murphy (1-0 each); Pts: Murphy (0-6, 3f, 2'65), D. Callan (0-2, 1f), A. Carter (1f), G. Smyth (0-1)

Referee: S. Whelan (Wexford)

GK	1	Ciarán Brennan (Coolera/Strandhill)
RCB	2	Fiachra Coyne (Calry/St. Joseph's)
FB	3	Walter Gill (Turloughmore, Galway)
LCB	4	Ronan Cox (Calry/St. Joseph's)
RHB	5	Dermot Clarke (Mullagh, Galway)
CHB	6	Mark Burke (Tubbercurry)
LHB	7	Liam Reidy (Calry/St. Joseph's)
MF	8	John Mullins (Mullagh, Galway)
MF	9	David Colleary (Calry/St. Joseph's)
RHF	10	Michael Gilmartin (Calry/St. Joseph's)
CHF	11	Damien Burke (Calry/St. Joseph's) (c)
LHF	12	Paul Seevers (Tubbercurry)
RCF	13	Joe Bannerton (Naomh Eoin)
FF	14	Keith Raymond (Calry/St. Joseph's)
LCF	15	Larry Cadden (Coolera/Strandhill)
Substitutes:
	16	Colin Herity (Dunnamaggin, Kilkenny) for Cadden
	17	Mick Shelly (Calry/St. Joseph's) for Bannerton
	18	Conor O'Mahony (Coolera/Strandhill) for Gilmartin
Manager:
Michael Galvin

GK	1	Stephen Smyth (Pearse Óg)
RCB	2	Conor Kerrigan (Knockbridge)
FB	3	Tony Teefy (Knockbridge)
LCB	4	Brian Hassett (Pearse Óg)
RHB	5	Donnach Callan (Pearse Óg)
CHB	6	Aidan Carter (Wolfe Tones)
LHB	7	Johnny Carter (Wolfe Tones)
MF	8	Trevor Hilliard (Knockbridge)
MF	9	Shane Kerrigan (Knockbridge)
RHF	10	Shane Fennell (Knockbridge)
CHF	11	Ronan Byrne (Knockbridge)
LHF	12	Gerard Smyth (Pearse Óg)
RCF	13	Seán Conroy (Pearse Óg)
FF	14	Shane Callan (Pearse Óg)
LCF	15	Diarmuid Murphy (Naomh Moninne)
Substitutes:
	16	Mark Kirwan (Wolfe Tones) for Teefy
	17	David Dunne (Knockbridge) (c) for G. Smyth
	18	Eddie McCarthy (Pearse Óg) for S. Kerrigan
	19	Collins Connolly (Dicksboro, Kilkenny) for Fennell
	20	Paul Dunne (Knockbridge) for Conroy
Manager:
Pat Clancy

=== Scores ===
Match	Date	Venue	Team	Score	Team	Score
Quarter-final	19 July	Parnell Park	Fingal	1-19	Leitrim	0-12
Quarter-final	19 July	Páirc Esler	South Down	2-16	Louth	4-13
Quarter-final	19 July	St Tiernach's Park	Monaghan	1-11	Cavan	0-09
Quarter-final	19 July	Markievicz Park	Sligo	2-15	Tyrone	2-11
semi-final	26 July	Monaghan	Monaghan	1-13	Louth	0-18
semi-final	26 July	Markievicz Park	Sligo	1-16	Fingal	0-11
Final	3 August	Croke Park	Louth	3-10	Sligo	3-19

== Miscellaneous ==
=== 2008 season facts ===
- Sligo, the eventual winners of the competition finished the preceding league tournament without a win, resulting in relegation to division 4 next year. Donegal, who won every game of the league, were eliminated from the Championship at the first (group stage) hurdle.
- Sligo had the opportunity of defending their crown in 2009 after losing 1–17 to 1–13 to Roscommon in the championship promotion/relegation play-off. However a change in the Hurling competition structures with the introduction of a 4th tier championship Lory Meagher Cup meant that sligo and Roscommon both played in the 2009 Nicky Rackard Cup.

== See also ==
- 2008 All-Ireland Senior Hurling Championship
- 2008 Ulster Senior Hurling Championship
- 2008 Christy Ring Cup (Tier 2)
