= 2008 Nicky Rackard Cup final =

Hurling decider

- Event: 2008 Nicky Rackard Cup
| Sligo | Louth |
| 3-19 | 3-10 |
- Date: 3 August 2008
- Venue: Croke Park, Dublin
- Referee: Seán Whelan (Wexford)

The 2008 Nicky Rackard Cup final was a hurling match played at Croke Park on 3 August 2008 to determine the winners of the 2008 Nicky Rackard Cup. This was the fourth season of the Nicky Rackard Cup, a tournament organized by the Gaelic Athletic Association for third-tier hurling teams. The final was contested by Sligo of Connacht and Louth of Leinster, with Sligo winning by 3-19 to 3-10.
