= 2021 Christy Ring Cup =

Hurling competition

- Dates: 26 June - 1 August 2021
- Teams: 5
- Champions: Offaly (1st title); Ben Conneely (captain); Michael Fennelly (manager)
- Runners-up: Derry; Cormac O'Doherty (captain); Dominic McKinley (manager); Cormac Donnelly (manager)
- Relegated: Roscommon

Tournament statistics
- Matches played: 8
- Goals scored: 23 (2.88 per match)
- Points scored: 338 (42.25 per match)
- Top scorer(s): Eoghan Cahill (0-36)

The 2021 Christy Ring Cup was the 17th staging of the Christy Ring Cup since its establishment by the Gaelic Athletic Association in 2005. The cup began on 26 June 2021 and ended on 1 August 2021.

COVID-19 caused all London games to be postponed for an extra year.

The final was played on 1 August 2021 at Croke Park in Dublin, between Offaly and Derry, in what was their first ever meeting in a final. Offaly won the match by 0-41 to 2-14 to claim their first ever cup title.

Offaly's Eoghan Cahill was the Ring Cup's top scorer with 0-36.

== Team changes ==
=== To Championship ===
Relegated from the Joe McDonagh Cup

- None

Promoted from the Nicky Rackard Cup

- None

=== From Championship ===
Promoted to the Joe McDonagh Cup

- Down
- Kildare

Relegated to the Nicky Rackard Cup

- None

== Teams ==
=== General Information ===
County	Last Cup title	Last provincial title	Last All-Ireland title	Position in 2020 Championship	Appearance
Derry	—	2001	—	Round 2	15th
Offaly	—	1995	1998	Semi-finals	2nd
Roscommon	—	1913	—	Semi-finals	13th
Sligo	—	—	—	Round 2	2nd
Wicklow	—	—	—	Round 2	

=== Personnel and kits ===
County	Manager	Captain(s)	Sponsor
Derry			
Offaly			
Roscommon			
Sligo			
Wicklow			

== Competition format ==
=== Cup format ===
The format has been changed for 2021 with 5 teams playing across two groups, one with 3 teams and one with 2 teams based on an open draw.

Group A will feature 3 teams and be played in a single Round Robin format with each team having one home game and one away game.

Group B will feature 2 teams who will play a single fixture.

All teams will play a knockout format after this group stage, with the group winners and second-placed team in Group A being placed in the semi-finals. A tie between the third-placed team in Group A and second-placed team in Group B will determine the fourth semi-finalist.

=== Promotion ===
The winner of the final will be promoted to the Joe McDonagh Cup.

=== Relegation ===
The loser of the quarter-final will be relegated to the Nicky Rackard Cup

== Group stage ==
=== Group A ===
Pos	Team	Pld	W	D	L	SF	SA	Diff	Pts	Qualification
1	Derry	2	2	0	0	2-42	1-33	+12	4	Advance to Semi-Finals
2	Wicklow	2	1	0	1	2-36	3-34	-1	2	Advance to Semi-Finals
3	Roscommon	2	0	0	2	2-26	2-37	-11	0	Advance to Quarter-Finals

==== Group A round 1 ====
26 June 2021 Round 1	Wicklow	2-18 - 1-11	Roscommon	Aughrim County Ground
	A O'Brien (0-10, 9f), G Hughes (1-1), M Lee (1-3), E Kearns (0-1); L Evans (0-1), C Moorehouse (0-1, sideline), E McCormack (0-1).	Report	C Egan (1-5, 5f, 1p), C Dolan (0-5, 1f), P Kellehan (0-1).	Referee: T Gleeson (Dublin)

==== Group A round 2 ====
3 July 2021 Round 2	Roscommon	1-15 - 0-19	Derry	Dr. Hyde Park
	C Dolan (0-6f); C Kennelly (1-0), C Mulry (0-2), D Heavey (0-2); C Egan (0-2), E Costello (0-1), B McGahon (0-1), C Kenny (0-1).	Report	C O’Doherty (0-8, 4f, 2 ‘65s); D Foley (0-2), G Bradley (0-2), S McGuigan (0-2), C Kelly (0-1), M McGuigan (0-1), O McKeever (0-1), B Cassidy (0-1), S Cassidy (0-1).	Referee: C Mooney (Dublin)

==== Group A round 3 ====
10 July 2021 Round 3	Derry	2-23 - 0-18	Wicklow	Owenbeg
	O McKeever (2-2), C O'Doherty (0-7, 5f, 1 65), S McGuigan (0-4), G Bradley (0-3), E Cassidy (0-2), B Cassidy (0-2), M McGuigan (0-1), D Foley (0-1), P Nelis (0-1).	Report	A O'Brien (0-12, 9f), S Cranley (0-1), C Moorehouse (0-1), D Staunton (0-1), E Kearns (0-1), G Hughes (0-1), L Evans (0-1).	Referee: C McDonald (Antrim)

=== Group B ===
Pos	Team	Pld	W	D	L	SF	SA	Diff	Pts	Qualification
1	Offaly	1	1	0	0	2-39	2-17	+22	2	Advance to Semi-Finals
2	Sligo	1	0	0	1	2-17	2-39	-22	0	Advance to Quarter-Finals

==== Group B round 1 ====
3 July 2021 Round 1	Sligo	2-17 - 2-39	Offaly	Markievicz Park
	G O'Kelly-Lynch 2-12 (12f), T Cawley, G Connolly, C Hanniffy, F Cawley and A Kilcullen 0-1 each.	Report	E Cahill 0-15 (9f and 3 '65s'), B Duignan 0-6, A Treacy and S Dooley 1-1 each, L Langton 0-5, J Murphy 0-4, O Kelly and K Sampson 0-2 each, L Fox, J Sampson and L O'Connor 0-1 each.	Referee: A Kelly (Galway)

== Knockout stage ==
=== Bracket ===
Quarter-Finals - 17 July
2B	Sligo	2-18
3A	Roscommon	1-20

Semi-Finals - 24 July
1A	Derry	0-28
2B	Sligo	2-17
1B	Offaly	6-30
2A	Wicklow	0-11

Final - 1 August
1A	Derry	2-14
1B	Offaly	0-41

=== Quarter-final ===
17 July 2021 Quarter-final	Roscommon	1-20 - 2-18	Sligo	Dr. Hyde Park
	C Dolan (4f) 0-8, C Kenny 0-4, N Kilroy 1-0, B McGahon 0-3, O Kelly, C Mulry 0-2 each, M Brennan 0-1	Report	M Hanniffy 2-1, G O’Kelly-Lynch 0-6 (5f), T Cawley, A Kilcullen 0-3 each, F Cawley 0-2, G Connolly, C Hanniffy, J McHugh 0-1 each.

Roscommon are relegated to the 2022 Nicky Rackard Cup.

=== Semi-finals ===
24 July 2021 Semi-final	Derry	0-28 - 2-17	Sligo	Owenbeg
	C O’Doherty 0-12 (8 fs), G Bradley 0-5, S McGuigan 0-3, Brian Cassidy and O McKeever 0-2 each, R Mullan, E Cassidy, M McGuigan, D Foley 0-1 each	Report	G O’Kelly-Lynch 1-6 (5 fs), J McHugh 1-4, C Hanniffy 0-2, T Cawley, A Kilcullen, E Comerford, L O’Kelly-Lynch 0-1 each.

24 July 2021 Semi-final	Offaly	6-30 - 0-10	Wicklow	Bord na Móna O'Connor Park
	E Cahill 0-8 (3f and one sideline), B Duignan 1-4, O Kelly 2-1, L Fox 1-2, B Conneely 1-1, K Sampson 1-0, J Murphy and E Kelly 0-3 each, J Sampson and S Dooley (2f) 0-2 each, A Treacy, L Langton, L O'Connor and C Gath 0-1 each.	Report	A O'Brien 0-8 (7f), E McCormack, G Weir and W Kinsella 0-1 each.

=== Final ===
1 August 2021 Final	Derry	2-14 - 0-41	Offaly	Croke Park
	C O'Doherty (0-5, 5f), B Cassidy (0-3), D Foley (0-1), G Bradley (1-1), O McKeever (1-1), S Cassidy (0-2), R Mullan (0-1).	Report	E Cahill (0-13, 8f), O Kelly (0-7), J Murphy (0-5), L Fox (0-2), L Langton (0-1), B Conneely (0-1), J Sampson (0-1), A Treacy (0-3), L O'Connor (0-2), S Kinsella (0-2), S Dooley (0-2, 2f), D Egan (0-1), K Sampson (0-1).	Referee: T Gleeson (Dublin)

Offaly are promoted to the 2022 Joe McDonagh Cup.

== Statistics ==
=== Top scorers ===
Top Scorer Overall

Rank	Player	County	Tally	Total	Matches	Average
1	Eoghan Cahill	Offaly	0-36	36	3	12.00
2	Gerard O'Kelly-Lynch	Sligo	3-24	33	3	11.00
3	Cormac O'Doherty	Derry	0-32	32	4	8.00
4	Andy O'Brien	Wicklow	0-30	30	3	10.00
5	Cathal Dolan	Roscommon	0-19	19	3	6.33
6	Oisín Kelly	Offaly	2-10	16	3	5.33
7	Odhran McKeever	Derry	3-06	15	4	3.75
8	Gerald Bradley	Derry	1-11	14	4	3.50
9	Brian Duignan	Offaly	1-10	13	3	4.33
10	John Murphy	Offaly	0-12	12	3	4.00

In a single game

Rank	Player	Club	Tally	Total	Opposition
1	Gerard O'Kelly-Lynch	Sligo	2-12	18	Offaly
2	Eoghan Cahill	Offaly	0-15	15	Sligo
3	Eoghan Cahill	Offaly	0-13	13	Derry
4	Andy O'Brien	Wicklow	0-12	12	Derry
4	Cormac O'Doherty	Derry	0-12	12	Offaly
6	Andy O'Brien	Wicklow	0-10	10	Roscommon
7	Gerard O'Kelly-Lynch	Sligo	1-06	9	Derry
8	Odhran McKeever	Derry	2-02	8	Wicklow
8	Cillian Egan	Roscommon	1-05	8	Wicklow
8	Andy O'Brien	Wicklow	0-08	8	Offaly
8	Cormac O'Doherty	Derry	0-08	8	Roscommon
8	Eoghan Cahill	Offaly	0-08	8	Wicklow
8	Cathal Dolan	Roscommon	0-08	8	Sligo
