= Gerard O'Kelly-Lynch =

Irish hurler

Personal information
- Native name: Gearóid Ó Ceallaigh-Ó Loingsigh (Irish)
- Born: 1996 (age 29–30) Sligo, Ireland
- Occupation: Engineer

Sport
- Sport: Hurling
- Position: Right wing-forward
Clubs
- Years: Club
- Naomh Eoin; St Mary's
Club titles
	Football	Hurling
Sligo titles	1	1
College
- Years: College
- 2013–2018: NUI Galway
College titles
- Fitzgibbon titles: 0
Inter-county
- Years: County
- 2013-present: Sligo
Inter-county titles
- Leinster titles: 0
- All-Irelands: 0
- NHL: 0
- All Stars: 0

Gerard O'Kelly-Lynch (born 1996) is an Irish hurler and Gaelic footballer who plays for Sligo Championship clubs Naomh Eoin and St Mary's and at inter-county level with the Sligo senior hurling team. He usually lines out as a forward.

== Career ==
O'Kelly Lynch first came to prominence as a dual player with the Naomh Eoin and St Mary's clubs in the respective juvenile and underage grades. After progressing onto the adult teams he has won County Senior Championship titles in both codes. O'Kelly-Lynch first appeared on the inter-county scene as a dual player at minor and under-21 levels. He was 17-years-old when he was drafted onto the Sligo senior hurling team in 2013, while he has also lined out with the Sligo senior football team. O'Kelly-Lynch has since won Nicky Rackard Cup and Lory Meagher Cup titles. Gerard has had limited success with his club Naomh Eoin which would be a Junior B standard club if it was south of the Galway/Dublin axis.

== Honours ==
St Mary's

- Sligo Senior Football Championship: 2015

Naomh Eoin

- Sligo Senior Hurling Championship: 2019

Sligo

- Nicky Rackard Cup: 2019
- Lory Meagher Cup: 2018
