= St Farnan's GAA =

Sligo-based Gaelic games club

St Farnan's
- Naomh Fearnain
- Founded: 1964
- County: Sligo
- Colours: Blue and white
- Grounds: St Farnan's Park, Templeboy

Playing kits
Standard colours

St Farnan's is a Gaelic Athletic Association club based in west County Sligo, Ireland. It was formed from the amalgamation of two local clubs, Dromore West and Templeboy in 1964.

As of 2022, it was competing as a Sligo Senior Football Championship club, for the first time since the 2012 season.

== Honours ==
- Sligo Intermediate Football Championship: (2)
  - 2007, 2021
- Sligo Junior Football Championship: (4)
  - 1972, 1983, 1997, 2005
- Sligo Under 20 Football Championship: (2)
  - 1995, 1997 (amalgamated with Easkey)
- Sligo Intermediate Football League Division 3 (ex Div. 2): (1)
  - 2011
- Sligo Junior Football League (Division 5): (3)
  - 1982, 1986, 1997
- Benson Cup: (5)
  - 1995, 1996, 1997, 2002, 2016, 2019
