= 2019 Nicky Rackard Cup =

- Dates: 11 May 2019 - 22 June 2019
- Teams: 8
- Champions: Sligo
- Runners-up: Armagh

The 2019 Nicky Rackard Cup is the 15th staging of the Nicky Rackard Cup hurling championship since its establishment by the Gaelic Athletic Association in 2005. It is the fourth tier of senior inter-county hurling as of 2019.

The competition began on Saturday 11 May 2019 and ends on Saturday 22 June 2019.

Donegal were the 2018 champions and were promoted to the 2019 Christy Ring Cup as a result of the restructuring of the All-Ireland Senior Hurling Championship.

Sligo were crowned champions after defeating Armagh in the final. Sligo's victory completed back to back championship triumphs and promotion from the fifth tier to the third by winning the 2018 Lory Meagher Cup and the 2019 Nicky Rackard Cup.

== Team changes ==
=== To Championship ===
Relegated from the Christy Ring Cup

- Armagh
- Mayo

Promoted from the Lory Meagher Cup

- Sligo

=== From Championship ===
Promoted to the Christy Ring Cup

- Donegal

Relegated to the Lory Meagher Cup

- Leitrim

== Competition format ==
In 2018 the Nicky Rackard Cup changed to an initial stage of one group of four teams and one group of three teams. Previously it was a double elimination tournament. In 2019 the group stage returned to two groups of four teams.

The top two teams in the two groups advance to the knockout semi-finals. The winners of the 2019 Nicky Rackard Cup are promoted to the 2020 Christy Ring Cup. One team will be relegated from the 2019 Christy Ring Cup to the 2020 Nicky Rackard Cup.

The bottom teams from each group playoff in a relegation match with the losers playing in the 2020 Lory Meagher Cup. They are replaced by the winners of the 2019 Lory Meagher Cup.

== Teams ==
8 teams competed in the 2019 Nicky Rackard Cup

Leinster (2): Longford, Louth

Connacht (2): Mayo, Sligo

Ulster (3): Armagh, Monaghan, Tyrone

Britain (1): Warwickshire

== Group stage ==
=== Group 1 ===
==== Group 1 Table ====
| Pos | Team | Pld | W | D | L | SF | SA | Diff | Pts | Qualification |
|---|---|---|---|---|---|---|---|---|---|---|
| 1 | Armagh | 3 | 2 | 1 | 0 | 74 | 58 | 16 | 5 | Advance to Knockout Stage |
| 2 | Warwickshire | 3 | 1 | 2 | 0 | 63 | 60 | 3 | 4 | Advance to Knockout Stage |
| 3 | Longford | 3 | 1 | 0 | 2 | 52 | 62 | -10 | 2 | |
| 4 | Monaghan | 3 | 0 | 1 | 2 | 61 | 70 | -9 | 1 | Advance to Relegation Playoff |

==== Group 1 Rounds 1 to 3 ====
===== Group 1 Round 1 =====
| 11 May 2019 Round 1 | Armagh | 2-20 - 2-14 | Monaghan |

| 12 May 2019 Round 1 | Longford | 1-12 – 1-15 | Warwickshire |

===== Group 1 Round 2 =====
| 18 May 2019 Round 2 | Warwickshire | 2-18 - 1-21 | Armagh |

| 19 May 2019 Round 2 | Monaghan | 1-17 - 2-17 | Longford |

===== Group 1 Round 3 =====
| 1 June 2019 Round 3 | Monaghan | 2-15 - 3-12 | Warwickshire |
| 1:00 pm |

| 1 June 2019 Round 3 | Longford | 0-14 - 0-24 | Armagh |
| 1:00 pm |

=== Group 2 ===
==== Group 2 Table ====
| Pos | Team | Pld | W | D | L | SF | SA | Diff | Pts | Qualification |
|---|---|---|---|---|---|---|---|---|---|---|
| 1 | Sligo | 3 | 2 | 1 | 0 | 80 | 61 | 19 | 5 | Advance to Knockout Stage |
| 2 | Tyrone | 3 | 2 | 0 | 1 | 62 | 63 | -1 | 4 | Advance to Knockout Stage |
| 3 | Mayo | 3 | 1 | 1 | 1 | 69 | 56 | 13 | 3 | |
| 4 | Louth | 3 | 0 | 0 | 3 | 65 | 82 | -31 | 0 | Advance to Relegation Playoff |

==== Group 2 Rounds 1 to 3 ====
===== Group 2 Round 1 =====
| 12 May 2019 Round 1 | Louth | 1-19 - 2-24 | Sligo |
| 1:00 pm |

| 12 May 2019 Round 1 | Tyrone | 1-15 - 0-15 | Mayo |
| 1:00 pm |

===== Group 2 Round 2 =====
| 19 May 2019 Round 2 | Sligo | 3-19 - 1-14 | Tyrone |
| 1:00 pm |

| 19 May 2019 Round 2 | Mayo | 3-23 - 1-13 | Louth |
| 1:00 pm |

===== Group 2 Round 3 =====
| 1 June 2019 Round 3 | Sligo | 2-16 - 1-19 | Mayo |
| 1:00 pm |

| 1 June 2019 Round 3 | Tyrone | 2-21 - 1-17 | Louth |
| 1:00 pm |

== Knockout stage ==
=== Bracket ===
Semifinals
1A | Armagh | 2-19
2B | Tyrone | 1-20
1B | Sligo | 2-21
2A | Warwickshire | 2-17

Finals
1A | Armagh | 2-13
1B | Sligo | 2-14

=== Semi-finals ===
The Group 1 winners play the Group 2 runners-up and the Group 2 winners play the Group 1 runners-up.

| 9 June 2019 Semi-final | Armagh | 2-19 (25) - (23) 1-20 | Tyrone |
| | | Report |

| 9 June 2019 Semi-final | Sligo | 2-21 (27) - (23) 2-17 | Warwickshire |

=== Final ===
The semi-final winners met in the Nicky Rackard Cup final at Croke Park with the winners being promoted to the Christy Ring Cup for 2020.

| 22 June 2019 Final | Armagh | 2-13 (19) - (20) 2-14 | Sligo |

Armagh will remain in the Nicky Rackard Cup. Silgo are promoted and will now play in the 2020 Christy Ring Cup

== Relegation playoff ==
The bottom teams in each group meet in a relegation playoff.

| 9 June 2019 Relegation final | Monaghan | 4-17 - 2-20 | Louth |

Monaghan remain in the 2020 Nicky Rackard Cup and Louth are relegated to the 2020 Lory Meagher Cup.
