= 2018 Lory Meagher Cup =

Hurling competition

- Dates: 19 May 2018 – 23 June 2018
- Teams: 4

The 2018 Lory Meagher Cup was the tenth edition of the Lory Meagher Cup since its establishment by the Gaelic Athletic Association in 2009 and is the fifth-tier of Hurling for senior county teams (the All-Ireland Senior Hurling Championship is the first-tier trophy). It is contested by four GAA county teams ranked 32–35 in the 2018 All-Ireland Senior Hurling Championship. The draw for the 2018 fixtures took place on 25 October 2017.

This was the first year that the Cup became the fifth tier of Hurling with the introduction of the Joe McDonagh Cup. The cup begun on 19 May 2018 and ended on 23 June 2018 with Sligo beating Lancashire at Croke Park.

== Team changes ==
=== From Championship ===
Promoted to the Nicky Rackard Cup

- Leitrim
- Warwickshire

== Group Stage ==
=== Table ===
Pos	Team	Pld	W	D	L	SF	SA	Diff	Pts	Qualification
1	Lancashire	3	2	0	1	4-62	7-33	+20	4	Advance to Final
2	Sligo	3	2	0	1	4-49	7-47	-7	4	Advance to Final
3	Cavan	3	1	1	1	8-40	3-58	-3	3	
4	Fermanagh	3	0	1	2	2-42	3-55	-17	1	

=== Round 1 ===
19 May 2018 Round 1	Fermanagh	1-19 - 2-16	Cavan	Brewster Park, Enniskillen
	J Duffy 0-9 (3 '65, 4f), S Curran 0-8 (4f), C Rafferty 1-0, T Cleary, R Bogue 0-1 each.	Report	J Sheanon 1-6f, S Keating 1-3; P Brady, Colum Sheanon, K Conneely 0-2 each; A Sheridan 0-1.	Referee: J Connors (Donegal)

19 May 2018 Round 1	Lancashire	2-19 - 4-14	Sligo	Old Bedians, Manchester
	R Crowley 1-10 (8f), JJ Dunphy 1-1, D Crowley, T Dunne, E Kenny 0-2 each, M Hawley, R Mullins 0-1 each.	Report	G O'Kelly-Lynch 1-7 (7f), L Cadden 2-0, K Banks 1-1, G Cadden 0-2, R McNamara, R Cox, E McDonagh, K Raymond 0-1 each.	Referee: J Clarke (Cavan)

=== Round 2 ===
26 May 2018 Round 2	Sligo	0-20 - 1-13	Fermanagh	Tourlestrane
	E Comerford 0-7 (4f); K Banks 0-5; G Cadden 0-3; K Raymond 0-2 (2f); K Prior, L Cadden, F O'Flynn 0-1 each.	Report	S Curran 0-9 (5f, 1 65); J P McGarry 1-1; C MacShea, BMcPhillips, A Magee 0-1 each.	Referee: J Clarke (Cavan)

26 May 2018 Round 2	Cavan	3-09 - 2-24	Lancashire	Ballyconnell
	J Sheanon 0-5 (2f); A Sheridan 1-0; Colm Sheanon, Cillian Sheanon 1-0 each; S Keating 0-2 (f); J Crowe, N Neary 0-1 each.	Report	R Crowley 0-16 (15f); E Kenny 1-2; S Power 1-0; J Duane 0-2; N Unwin, S Duncan, D Crowley, JJ Dunphy 0-1 each.	Referee: C Mooney (Dublin)

=== Round 3 ===
9 June 2018 Round 3	Fermanagh	0-10 - 1-19	Lancashire	Brewster Park, Enniskillen

9 June 2018 Round 3	Sligo	0-15 - 4-15	Cavan	Markievicz Park, Sligo

== Final ==
23 June 2018 Final	Sligo	4-15 - 2-20	Lancashire	Croke Park
	K Gilmartin 3-0; E Comerford 1-5 (1-0 pen, 0-4f); J McHugh 0-3; K Raymond (2f), K Banks 0-2 each; G Cadden, G O'Kelly-Lynch, R Cox 0-1 each	Report	R Crowley 1-10 (0-6f); E Kenny 1-7; J Fitzmaurice, JJ Dunphy, D O'Brien 0-1 each	Referee: Kevin McGeeney (Roscommon)

== Statistics ==
=== Top scorers ===
==== Overall ====
Rank	Player	County	Tally	Total	Matches	Average
1	Ronan Crowley	Lancashire	1-26	29	2	14.50
2	Edmond Kenny	Lancashire	3-16	25	4	6.25
3	John Sheanon	Cavan	1-11	14	2	7.00
4	Gerard O'Kelly-Lynch	Sligo	1-07	10	2	5.00
5	Kevin Banks	Sligo	1-06	9	2	4.50
5	John Duffy	Fermanagh	0-09	9	1	9.00

==== In a single game ====
Rank	Player	Club	Tally	Total	Opposition
1	Ronan Crowley	Lancashire	0-16	16	Cavan
2	Ronan Crowley	Lancashire	1-10	13	Sligo
3	Gerard O'Kelly-Lynch	Sligo	1-07	10	Lancashire
3	Edmond Kenny	Lancashire	1-07	10	Sligo
5	John Duffy	Fermanagh	0-09	9	Cavan
5	Shea Curran	Fermanagh	0-09	9	Sligo
5	Kevin Gilmartin	Sligo	3-00	9	Lancashire
8	Shea Curran	Fermanagh	0-08	8	Cavan
9	Eoin Comerford	Sligo	0-07	7	Fermanagh
10	Larry Cadden	Sligo	2-00	6	Lancashire
10	Seán Keating	Cavan	1-03	6	Fermanagh

=== Scoring events ===
- Widest winning margin: 12 points
  - Cavan 3-09 - 2-24 Lancashire (Round 2)
  - Fermanagh 0-10 - 1-19 Lancashire (Round 3)
  - Sligo 0-15 - 4-15 Cavan (Round 3)
- Most goals in a match: 6
  - Lancashire 2-19 - 4-14 Sligo (Round 1)
  - Lancashire 2-20 - 4-15 Sligo (Final)
- Most points in a match: 35
  - Fermanagh 1-19 - 2-16 Cavan (Round 1)
  - Lancashire 2-20 - 4-15 Sligo (Final)
- Most goals by one team in a match: 4
  - Lancashire 2-19 - 4-14 Sligo (Round 1)
  - Sligo 0-15 - 4-15 Cavan (Round 3)
  - Lancashire 2-20 - 4-15 Sligo (Final)
- Most points by one team in a match: 24
  - Cavan 3-09 - 2-24 Lancashire (Round 2)
- Highest aggregate score: 53 points
  - Lancashire 2-20 - 4-15 Sligo (Final)
- Lowest aggregate score: 32 points
  - Fermanagh 0-10 - 1-19 Lancashire (Round 3)

== Miscellaneous ==
- Sligo win their 1st championship in 10 years, last winning the 2008 Nicky Rackard Cup

== See also ==
- 2018 All-Ireland Senior Hurling Championship
- 2018 Leinster Senior Hurling Championship
- 2018 Munster Senior Hurling Championship
- 2018 Joe McDonagh Cup
- 2018 Christy Ring Cup
- 2018 Nicky Rackard Cup
