= Sligo GAA =

County board of the Sligo Gaelic Athletic Association in Ireland

- Irish: Sligeach
- Nickname(s): The Yeats County
- Province: Connacht
- Dominant sport: Gaelic football
- Ground(s): Markievicz Park, Sligo
- County colours: Black White
- Website: www.sligogaa.ie

County teams
- NFL: Division 3
- NHL: Division 2B
- Football Championship: Sam Maguire Cup
- Hurling Championship: Christy Ring Cup
- Ladies' Gaelic football: Brendan Martin Cup

The Sligo County Board of the Gaelic Athletic Association (GAA) (Irish: Cumann Luthchleas Gael Coiste Chontae Shligigh) or Sligo GAA is one of the 32 county boards of the GAA in Ireland, and is responsible for Gaelic games in County Sligo. The county board is also responsible for the Sligo county teams.

The county football team plays in the Connacht Senior Football Championship but has only won three senior provincial titles, in 1928, 1975, and 2007. Sligo has never appeared in an All-Ireland final, with the 1922 Championship is the closest it has come, defeating Roscommon, Mayo GAA, and Galway to win the Connacht title, and beating Tipperary in the subsequent All-Ireland semi-final that followed. However, "a flimsy technicality" led to a replay of the Connacht final against Galway, which Sligo lost.

As of 2009, there were 26 clubs affiliated to Sligo GAA ; the second smallest, ahead of Longford, which had 24.

== Football ==
=== Clubs ===
Tubbercurry is the most successful team in the history of the Club Championships in Sligo, with 20 senior titles to its name with the last of these was won in 2014.

St Mary's is Sligo's most successful club team in the Provincial and All-Ireland club series with three Connacht Senior Club Football Championship titles to its name (1977, 1980, and 1983). The club also won the All-Ireland sevens title in 1980. St Mary's, along with Tubbercurry, dominated the club scene in Sligo over a 15 year period (1976–1991), with St Mary's claiming eight championships to Tubber's three. The pairing contested the final on eight occasions, including five in succession (1983–1987), and these finals were tense and heated encounters. In recent years Tourlestrane has dominated Sligo club football.

St Mary's and Tubbercurry also jointly lead the roll of honour for the Under-21 Championships with Tubbercurry, having both won on six occasions as of 2015.

St Mary's leads the roll of honour for the Minor Championship, with 11 titles as of 2015, having won the previous five championships in succession (2011–2015).

In the years since the dominance of St Mary's and Tubbercurry, there have been various winners of the county championship with Bunninadden, Coolera/Strandhill, Curry, Eastern Harps, Shamrock Gaels and Tourlestrane all claiming the Owen B. Hunt Cup during the past two decades. Other senior teams that have come close to winning the championship in the past few years include St John's and Easkey.

In 2005, Coolera/Strandhill won its first senior title in 98 years, having narrowly lost the 2000 final to Bunninadden, which at that time had not won a title in 109 years.

At minor and underage levels, Tubbercurry and St Mary's have achieved success in recent years although many titles during the past decade have been won by Sligo town's two main clubs.

Sligo's club football scene is not dominated by any single team; there were no back-to-back winners since the St Patrick's team of 1988 and 1989, the longest out of any county in history, until Tourlestrane did the two-in-a-row in 2016 and 2017.

In club football, no Sligo team has ever appeared in an All-Ireland Senior Club Football Championship final. St Mary's is the only Sligo team to have ever won the Connacht Senior Club Football Championship, having won it three times in 1977, 1980 and 1983. Eastern Harps, Curry and Tourlestrane have all appeared in Connacht finals.

==== 2023 club football status ====
| Club | Championship | | League | | |
| Club | 1st Team | 2nd Team | 1st Team | 2nd Team | 3rd Team |
|---|---|---|---|---|---|
| Ballymote | Intermediate | Junior B | Division 2 | Division 4C | |
| Bunninadden | Intermediate | Junior B | Division 2 | Division 4C | |
| Calry/St Joseph's | Intermediate | Junior B | Division 1 | Division 4B | |
| Castleconnor | Intermediate | Junior B | Division 3 | Division 4B | |
| Cloonacool | Intermediate | N/A | Division 3 | N/A | |
| Coolaney/Mullinabreena | Senior | Junior B | Division 1 | Division 4A | |
| Coolera/Strandhill | Senior | Junior B | Division 1 | Division 4A | |
| Curry | Intermediate | Junior A | Division 2 | Division 4A | |
| Drumcliffe/Rosses Point | Senior | Junior B | Division 2 | Division 4A | |
| Easkey | Senior | Junior B | Division 2 | Division 4C | |
| Eastern Harps | Senior | Junior A | Division 2 | Division 3 | |
| Enniscrone/Kilglass | Intermediate | Junior B | Division 2 | Division 4B | |
| Geevagh | Intermediate | Junior B | Division 2 | Division 4C | |
| Owenmore Gaels | Junior A | Junior B | Division 2 | Division 4B | |
| Shamrock Gaels | Senior | Intermediate | Division 1 | Division 3 | Division 4C |
| St Farnan's | Intermediate | Junior B | Division 1 | Division 4A | |
| St John's | Junior A | Junior B | Division 3 | Division 4A | |
| St Mary's | Senior | Junior A | Division 1 | Division 3 | Division 4C |
| St Michael's | Junior A | Junior B | Division 3 | Division 4 | |
| St Molaise Gaels | Senior | Junior A | Division 1 | Division 4 | |
| St Patrick's | Intermediate | Junior B | Division 3 | Division 4B | |
| Tourlestrane | Senior | Junior A | Division 1 | Division 3 | |
| Tubbercurry | Senior | Junior B | Division 1 | Division 4B | |

=== County team ===
Due to its much smaller population than both County Galway and County Mayo, the two dominant forces in the province of Connacht, and competition from professional League of Ireland football club Sligo Rovers in the county's capital town. The Sligo county football team have never been able to break from the shackles inherent in the provincial championship format. They have won only three Connacht championships, with about 50 years between each win. These championships came in 1928, 1975, and 2007.

Sligo have never appeared in an All-Ireland final; the 1922 Championship is the closest they have come, defeating Roscommon, Mayo and Galway to win the Connacht title, and beating Tipperary in the subsequent All-Ireland semi-final that followed. However an objection from Galway on what is described as "a flimsy technicality" led to the Connacht decider being brought to a replay, which Sligo went on to lose. Sligo met the same fate in the inaugural National Football League campaign of 1926, beating Laois to reach the final, only for Laois to object on the grounds of a Sligo player's name being misspelled; Sligo lost the replay. This gives Sligo the unique position of having qualified for an All-Ireland Senior Football Championship Final and a National Football League Final, without ever having contested either.

In 1954, Sligo reached the Connacht final against Galway, only for an equalising goal in the final minute to be disallowed. In 1962, Sligo reached the Connacht final against Roscommon, and led for much of the match only to be blighted by a sudden string of injuries, miss a 50 while two points ahead in the final minute, and then gift soon-to-be All-Ireland finalists Roscommon a goal in what is considered "one of the great football tragedies in Connacht". In 1965, Sligo reached the Connacht final against Galway and gained a seven-point lead, only for one of their players to be "mysteriously sent to the full-forward spot", causing "the entire team [to lose] momentum" and the match.

Since the 2001 introduction to the All-Ireland Senior Football Championship of a qualifier system for teams eliminated from their provincial championship, Sligo, despite historically having a poor record, has enjoyed some modest, though noteworthy, success. The new format together with a prolonged period of competing in Division 1 of the National Football League helped bring about an upward turn in the county's fortunes. In 2002, having narrowly lost the Connacht Senior Football Final to Galway, the defending All-Ireland champions, Sligo went on to defeat Tyrone in Croke Park, turning over a seven-point deficit in the process. A similar comeback against the eventual All-Ireland champions Armagh two weeks later led to a replay, but Sligo's run was halted when they had claims for a penalty in injury time of the second game turned down.

On 8 July 2007, Sligo claimed their first Connacht title since 1975 with a one-point victory over Galway. The following year they were beaten by Mayo and ended up in the Tommy Murphy Cup, after a league campaign that had seen them relegated to Division 4. Star player Eamonn O'Hara said he was embarrassed by the team's rapid decline back into mediocrity. On 27 June 2010, Sligo hosted Galway and led 1–8 to 0–2 at halftime but were shocked by an undeserved draw ending 1–10 each. The replay saw Sligo defeat the Tribesmen on the scoreline of 1–14 to 0–16 to advance to the Connacht Senior Football Final. Once there, after all their hard work and continued misfortune, Roscommon defeated them by 0–14 to 0–13.

Sligo football descended to a new depth on 26 May 2013 when they were dumped out of the Connacht Championship by London in their first game. The scoreline was 1–12 to 0–14. This was London's first victory in the Connacht Championship since 1977. Lorcan Mulvey scored the vital London goal.

The county Vocational Schools team reached two All-Ireland finals in 1962 and 1963, losing both to Dublin City.

== Hurling ==
=== Clubs ===
At present currently 6 Clubs contest the Sligo Senior Hurling Championship; there are, however, a growing number of hurling clubs in the County. At present, there are 10 clubs offering hurling at underage level in Sligo with a view to extending Senior status to at least 2 of these in the coming years.

=== County team ===
Sligo does not have a notable tradition of hurling historically; despite this, the hurlers have attained noticeably more success than their football counterparts in recent years.

Sligo, under the management of Mickey Galvin, won its first All-Ireland hurling title at senior level by defeating Louth in the 2008 Nicky Rackard Cup Final.

In 2018, Sligo won a senior All-Ireland title for the first time since 2008 under then Management Team of Darragh Cox and Daithí Hand. The county defeated Lancashire in the 2018 Lory Meagher Cup final, with a last-minute Kevin Gilmartin goal (his third of the game) sealing the victory.

Sligo followed this up with a second consecutive All-Ireland title at senior level, defeating Armagh in the 2019 Nicky Rackard Cup final. The then management team consisted of Daithí Hand, Colum O'Meara and a second Galvin brother, Peter. A last minute point by substitute Kieran Prior snatched the Final from the jaws of defeat on the day, gaining another promotion for the Yeats' County Men in successive years.

This continued success was further cemented by a Division 3B National League Title in 2020, followed by a Divisions 3A National League Title in 2021 to add to the growing national awards in the Scarden trophy cabinet.

== Ladies' football ==
Sligo ladies' football team has won one All-Ireland Junior title in 2006, managed at the time by Paddy Henry.

The team is currently competing in the Intermediate Championship.

The team won a number of club provincial junior titles, as both St Nathy's and Drumcliffe in recent years have won and both have reached the All-Ireland Finals.

Sligo camogie official Nuala Kavanagh refereed the 1965 All-Ireland Senior Camogie Championship Final.

Under Camogie's National Development Plan 2010–2015, "Our Game, Our Passion", three new camogie clubs were to be established in Sligo and a county board formed by 2015.

A camogie board was not established in the county until January 2025.
