= Tailteann Cup =

Annual Gaelic football competition

- Current season or competition: 2026 Tailteann Cup
- Irish: Corn Tailteann
- Code: Gaelic football
- Founded: 2022
- Region: Ireland (GAA)
- No. of teams: 17
- Title holders: Wicklow (1st title)
- Most titles: Westmeath, Meath, Down, Kildare, Wicklow (1 titles)
- TV partner: RTÉ
- Official website: www.gaa.ie

The Tailteann Cup is a Gaelic football competition held annually since 2022 and organised by the Gaelic Athletic Association (GAA). It is contested by those county teams, which, in the given year, have not otherwise qualified for the All-Ireland Senior Football Championship, and the winner is awarded the Tailteann Cup. The name 'Tailteann' comes from the ancient Tailteann Games.

The cup has been won by five different counties, none of which has won the title more than once. As the prize for the winner is automatic entry to the following year's All-Ireland championship, it is not possible for a team to defend a title. The all-time record-holders are currently Down, Meath, Westmeath, Kildare and Wicklow, who have won the cup on one occasion each. Down are also the only team to appear in the final more than once, finishing as runners-up in the 2023 and 2026 finals and champions in 2024.

== History ==
=== Creation ===
Following ongoing one-sided matches in the All-Ireland Senior Football Championship between counties of differing standards, the Gaelic Athletic Association (GAA) began considering the addition of a tournament for those counties that were eliminated in the early stages of their respective provincial championship. At a national conference in November 2018, the GAA found broad support for the introduction of this championship and canvassed options for its potential structure and future inclusion within the annual calendar. One year later at a specially convened congress, 76% of delegates formally approved of the second-tier tournament. The tournament was named the Tailteann Cup in February 2020, and it was intended it would hold its inaugural season that year. However, its introduction was ultimately delayed until 2022, due the impact of the COVID-19 pandemic on Gaelic games over that period.

Alternative championship competitions, such as the Christy Ring Cup and Nicky Rackard Cup, had been incorporated into hurling for several years, later joined by the Joe McDonagh Cup from 2018 onwards.

=== Format history ===
==== 2022 ====
The first Tailteann Cup was a knockout tournament whereby once a team was defeated they were eliminated from the championship. The pairings were drawn by location. Each match was played as a single leg.

==== 2023–2025 ====
The Tailteann Cup emulated the All-Ireland Senior Football Championship format which includes a group stage and a knockout stage.

==== 2026- ====
Alongside the All-Ireland SFC, the Tailteann Cup moved to a double-elimination format from 2026 onwards.

=== Tailteann Cup moments ===
- Westmeath 2-14 - 1-13 Cavan (1 July 2022): Westmeath won the inaugural Tailteann Cup, defeating Cavan in Croke Park.
- Down 8-16 - 2-12 Laois (25 June 2023): This semi-final meeting was the biggest ever Tailteann Cup winning margin in the competition's history.
- Wicklow 1-21 - 2-16 Down (11 July 2026): In the 2026 final after already surprising some with 4 wins on the trot Wicklow mounted a comeback for the ages, recovering from 2-13 to 0-4 behind after 36 minutes to score 1-17 to Down’s abysmal 0-3 in the final 34 minutes to clinch a rare title in their mainly uneventful history.

== Format ==
Down (in red jerseys) take on Laois during the 2024 final

Up to 17 teams compete in the cup. The teams are drawn from the bottom 16 rankings from that season's National Football League, plus New York. However, if a team in this position qualifies for the final of its provincial championship, that team continues to compete in the same year's All-Ireland Senior Football Championship and does not compete in the Tailteann Cup.

The teams that compete in the Tailteann Cup play a first round against each other, with winners and losers moving into two separate brackets afterwards, followed by semi-finals and the final. The Winners of the four Quarter Final pairings qualify for the semi-finals, with pairings decided via an open draw. The final of the Tailteann Cup is currently scheduled three weeks before the All-Ireland Football Final, and is staged at Croke Park in Dublin.

For the inaugural 2022 Tailteann Cup, the format was altered to a straight-knockout competition with Round 1 and the Quarter Finals organised on a geographical basis with Northern and Southern Sections. From 2023 to 2025, there are scheduled to be no North/South sections.

Unlike the contest for the Sam Maguire Cup, London and New York are permitted to meet each other in the contest for the Tailteann Cup.

=== Tailteann Cup knockout stage ===
==== Round 1 (16 teams remaining) ====
The sixteen teams who did not qualify for the All-Ireland series are drawn at random into eight ties. The first team chosen receives home-field advantage.

==== Round 2A (Eight teams) ====
Winners of the Round 1 ties play each other in this round, with fixtures chosen by open draw and the first team chosen playing at home. Three winners progress to the quarter-finals and one team moves to the preliminary quarter-final.

==== Round 2B (Eight teams) ====
Losers of the Round 1 ties play each other in this round. Winners progress to Round 3 and losers are eliminated.

==== Round 3 (Eight teams) ====
Losers of Round 2A ties play winners of Round 2B ties in this round. Home advantage is determined by a separate draw from the draw for fixtures and rematches from Round One are avoided where possible. Winners progress to the quarter-finals and losers are eliminated.

==== Preliminary quarter-final (Two teams) ====
One Round 2A winner (selected at random) plays New York in this round. The Round 2A winner is guaranteed home advantage unless that team is London, in which case the game will be moved to a neutral site in Ireland.

==== Quarter-finals (Eight teams remaining) ====
Winners from Round 2A and the preliminary quarter-final are seeded and play a Round 3 winner, with rematches avoided where possible. Round 2A/PQF winners receive home advantage unless they are New York, who will play at a neutral site in Ireland should they advance.

==== Semi-finals (Four teams remaining) ====
The winners of the quarter-finals make up the semi-final pairings. Rematches from either provincial championships or earlier in the Tailteann Cup are avoided where possible. Games are played at neutral venues determined by the Competition Committee. Two teams are eliminated at this stage while the winners advance to the final.

==== Final ====
The two winners of the semi-finals contest this game. Winning team are declared Tailteann Cup champions.

== Teams ==
=== 2026 teams ===
Seventeen teams compete in the 2026 Tailteann Cup.

County	Tailteann	Provincial	All-Ireland	Position in 2025	Appearance
Antrim	—	1951	—	Preliminary quarter-finals	5th
Carlow	—	1944	—	Preliminary quarter-finals	5th
Clare	—	1992	—	—	1st
Down	2024	1994	1994	—	4th
Fermanagh	—	—	—	Semi-finals	5th
Laois	—	2003	—	Preliminary quarter-finals	5th
Leitrim	—	1994	—	Group stage	5th
Limerick	—	1896	1896	Final	4th
London	—	—	—	Group stage	5th
Longford	—	1968	—	Group stage	5th
New York	—	—	—	Preliminary quarter-finals	5th
Offaly	—	1997	1982	Quarter-finals	5th
Sligo	—	2007	—	Quarter-finals	4th
Tipperary	—	2020	1920	Group stage	5th
Waterford	—	1898	—	Group stage	5th
Wexford	—	1945	1918	Quarter-finals	5th
Wicklow	—	—	—	Semi-finals	5th

== Venues ==
=== Cup venues ===
==== Group stage, preliminary quarter-finals and quarter-finals ====
Fixtures in the three group stage rounds of the cup are played at the home ground of one of the two teams. Each team is guaranteed at least one home game.

==== Semi-finals and final ====
The Tailteann Cup semi-finals and final are played at Croke Park.

=== 2023 venues ===
County	Location	Province	Stadium	Capacity
Antrim	Belfast	Ulster	Corrigan Park	3,700
Carlow	Carlow	Leinster	Dr Cullen Park	21,000
Cavan	Cavan	Ulster	Breffni Park	32,000
Down	Newry	Ulster	Páirc Esler	20,000
Fermanagh	Enniskillen	Ulster	Brewster Park	20,000
Laois	Portlaoise	Leinster	O'Moore Park	27,000
Leitrim	Carrick-on-Shannon	Connacht	Páirc Seán Mac Diarmada	9,331
Limerick	Limerick	Munster	Gaelic Grounds	44,023
London	South Ruislip	Britain	McGovern Park	3,000
Longford	Longford	Leinster	Pearse Park	10,000
Meath	Navan	Leinster	Páirc Tailteann	11,000
New York	Bronx	North America	Gaelic Park	2,000
Offaly	Tullamore	Leinster	O'Connor Park	20,000
Tipperary	Thurles	Munster	Semple Stadium	45,690
Waterford	Waterford	Munster	Fraher Field	15,000
Wexford	Wexford	Leinster	Chadwicks Wexford Park	20,000
Wicklow	Aughrim	Leinster	Aughrim County Ground	7,000

== Managers ==
=== Winning managers ===
#	Manager(s)	Winning team(s)	Titles(s)	Winning years
1	Jack Cooney	Westmeath	1	2022
1	Colm O'Rourke	Meath	1	2023
1	Conor Laverty	Down	1	2024
1	Brian Flanagan	Kildare	1	2025
1	Oisín McConville	Wicklow	1	2026

== List of finals ==
Year	Date	Winner		Runner-up		Venue	Winning captain(s)	Winning margin	Referee
Year	Date	County	Score	County	Score	Venue	Winning captain(s)	Winning margin	Referee
2022	9 July	Westmeath	2–14 (20)	Cavan	1–13 (16)	Croke Park	Kevin Maguire	4	Barry Cassidy (Derry)
2023	15 July	Meath	2–13 (19)	Down	0–14 (14)	Croke Park	Donal Keogan	5	Noel Mooney (Cavan)
2024	13 July	Down	0–14 (14)	Laois	2–6 (12)	Croke Park	Pierce Laverty	2	Brendan Griffin (Kerry)
2025	12 July	Kildare	1–24 (27)	Limerick	2–19 (25)	Croke Park	Kevin Feely	2	Liam Devenney (Mayo)
2026	11 July	Wicklow	1-21 (24)	Down	2-16 (22)	Croke Park	Dean Healy	2	Barry Tiernan (Dublin)

== Roll of honour ==
=== Performances by county team ===
County team	Title(s)	Runner-up	Years won	Years runner-up
Down	1	2	2024	2023, 2026
Westmeath	1	0	2022	—
Meath	1	0	2023	—
Kildare	1	0	2025	—
Wicklow	1	0	2026	—
Cavan	0	1	—	2022
Laois	0	1	—	2024
Limerick	0	1	—	2025

=== Performances by province ===
Province	Winner	Runner-up
Leinster	4	1
Ulster	1	3
Munster	0	1
Connacht	0	0

== Team records and statistics ==
=== Team results ===
==== Legend ====
- 1st – Champion
- 2nd – Runner-up
- SF – Semi-finalist
- PR/R{1/2/3}/GS/PQF/QF – Preliminary Round/Round {1/2/3}/Group Stage/Preliminary Quarter-final/Quarter-final
- AI – All-Ireland Senior Football Championship

For each year, the number of teams in each championship (in brackets) are shown.

Team	2022 (17)	2023 (17)	2024 (17)	2025 (17)	2026 (17)	Years
Antrim	R1	SF	SF	PQF	QF	5
Carlow	QF	QF	GS	PQF	R2	5
Cavan	2nd	QF	AI	AI	AI	2
Clare	AI	AI	AI	AI	R2	1
Down	R1	2nd	1st	AI	2nd	4
Fermanagh	QF	PQF	QF	SF	SF	5
Kildare	AI	AI	QF	1st	AI	3
Laois	R1	SF	2nd	PQF	QF	5
Leitrim	QF	GS	PQF	GS	R3	5
Limerick	AI	QF	QF	2nd	R2	4
London	R1	GS	PQF	GS	R3	5
Longford	R1	PQF	GS	GS	R3	5
Meath	AI	1st	AI	AI	AI	1
New York	QF	PQF	PQF	PQF	PQF	5
Offaly	SF	PQF	GS	QF	SF	5
Sligo	SF	AI	SF	QF	QF	4
Tipperary	R1	GS	PQF	GS	R3	5
Waterford	PR	GS	GS	GS	R2	5
Westmeath	1st	AI	AI	QF	AI	2
Wexford	PR	QF	GS	QF	QF	5
Wicklow	R1	GS	QF	SF	1st	5

=== Seasons in Tailteann Cup ===
The number of years that each county team has played in the Tailteann Cup (between 2022 and 2025). A total of 21 county teams have competed in at least one season of the Tailteann Cup. The county teams in bold participated in the 2026 Tailteann Cup.

Years	Counties
5	**Antrim**, **Carlow**, **Fermanagh**, **Laois**, **Leitrim**, **London**, **Longford**, **New York**, **Offaly**, **Tipperary**, **Waterford**, **Wexford**, **Wicklow**
4	**Down**, **Limerick**, **Sligo**
2	Cavan, Kildare, Westmeath
1	**Clare**, Meath

=== Debut of county teams ===
Year	Debutants	Total
2022	Antrim, Carlow, Cavan, Down, Fermanagh, Laois, Leitrim, London, Longford, New York, Offaly, Sligo, Tipperary, Waterford, Westmeath, Wexford, Wicklow	17
2023	Limerick, Meath	2
2024	Kildare	1
2025	No débutants	0
2026	Clare	1
**Total**		**21**

=== All-time table ===
Legend

Colours
Currently competing in the All-Ireland Senior Football Championship
Currently competing in the Tailteann Cup

After 2026 final

#	Team	Pld	W	D	L	Points	P.P.G.
1	Down	20	15	0	5	30	1.500
2	Fermanagh	20	12	1	7	25	1.250
3	Wicklow	21	12	0	9	24	1.143
4	Antrim	19	11	1	7	23	1.211
=	Laois	21	10	3	8	23	1.095
6	Sligo	17	10	1	6	21	1.235
=	Offaly	20	10	1	9	21	1.050
7	Limerick	17	10	0	7	20	1.176
9	Kildare	10	9	0	1	18	1.800
10	Westmeath	9	7	0	2	14	1.556
=	Wexford	18	6	2	10	14	0.778
12	Meath	6	6	0	0	12	2.000
=	Cavan	8	6	0	2	12	1.500
=	Carlow	16	5	2	9	12	0.750
15	Leitrim	15	5	0	10	10	0.667
16	Tipperary	14	3	0	11	6	0.429
=	Longford	14	3	0	11	6	0.429
18	London	14	2	1	11	5	0.333
19	Waterford	12	1	0	11	2	0.167
20	Clare	2	0	0	2	0	0.000
=	New York	5	0	0	5	0	0.000

=== By decade ===
The most successful team of each decade, judged by number of Tailteann Cup titles, is as follows:

- 2020s: 1 each for Westmeath (2022), Meath (2023), Down (2024), Kildare (2025) and Wicklow (2026).

=== Match records ===
- Most matches played
  - 21, Laois, Wicklow
- Most wins
  - 15, Down
- Most losses
  - 11, Longford, Waterford, Tipperary, London
- Most draws
  - 3, Laois

=== Other records ===
==== Finishing positions ====
- Most championships
  - 1, Westmeath (2022)
  - 1, Meath (2023)
  - 1, Down (2024)
  - 1, Kildare (2025)
  - 1, Wicklow (2026)
- Most second-place finishes
  - 2, Down (2023, 2026)
- Most semi-final finishes
  - 2, Sligo (2022, 2024)
  - 2, Antrim (2023, 2024)
  - 2, Offaly (2022, 2026)
  - 2, Fermanagh (2025, 2026)
- Most quarter-final finishes
  - 3, Wexford (2024, 2025, 2026)
- Most preliminary quarter-final finishes
  - 4, New York (2023, 2024, 2025, 2026)
- Most group stage finishes
  - 3, Waterford (2023, 2024, 2025)

==== Unbeaten sides ====
- Teams that have won the Tailteann Cup unbeaten:
  - Westmeath had 4 wins in 2022.
  - Meath had 6 wins in 2023.
  - Down had 6 wins in 2024.
  - Kildare had 6 wins in 2025.

==== Beaten sides ====
On five occasions a team was defeated twice, but remained in the knockout championship:

- Longford (2023) were beaten by Carlow and Limerick, but still qualified for the knockout stage.
- Tipperary (2024) were beaten by Sligo and Antrim, but still qualified for the knockout stage.
- Wicklow (2024) were beaten by Fermanagh and Laois, but still qualified for the knockout stage.
- London (2024) were beaten by Down and Limerick, but still qualified for the knockout stage.
- Antrim (2025) were beaten by Westmeath and Limerick, but still qualified for the knockout stage.

==== Final success rate ====
Four teams have been victorious on each occasion they have appeared in the final:

- Westmeath (2022)
- Meath (2023)
- Kildare (2025)
- Wicklow (2025)

On the opposite end of the scale, three teams have lost on each occasion they have appeared in the final:

- Cavan (2022)
- Laois (2024)
- Limerick (2025)

==== Consecutive participations ====
- 5, Antrim (2022–2026)
- 5, Carlow (2022–2026)
- 5, Fermanagh (2022–2026)
- 5, Laois (2022–2026)
- 5, Leitrim (2022–2026)
- 5, London (2022–2026)
- 5, Longford (2022–2026)
- 5, New York (2022–2026)
- 5, Offaly (2022–2026)
- 5, Tipperary (2022–2026)
- 5, Waterford (2022–2026)
- 5, Wexford (2022–2026)
- 5, Wicklow (2022–2026)

13 counties have the record number of consecutive participations in the Tailteann Cup, taking part in the all five editions of the competition.

==== Winning other trophies ====
Although not an officially recognised achievement, no teams have ever achieved the distinction of winning the Tailteann Cup and their respective Division in the National Football League.

==== Biggest wins ====
- The most one sided finals:
  - **5 points** – 2023: Meath 2–13 - 0–14 Down
  - **4 points** – 2022: Westmeath 2–14 - 1–13 Cavan
- The most one sided matches:
  - **22 points** – 2024: Waterford 0–6 - 5–15 Kildare
  - **22 points** – 2023: Down 8–16 - 2–12 Laois
  - **20 points** – 2024: Kildare 3–25 - 1–11 Longford
  - **20 points** – 2026: Fermanagh 3–27 - 1–13 New York
  - **18 points** – 2023: Tipperary 0–6 - 2–18 Down
  - **17 points** – 2023: Meath 2–23 - 0–12 Wexford
  - **17 points** – 2024: Sligo 2–20 - 0–9 London
  - **17 points** – 2024: London 0–10 - 1–24 Down
  - **17 points** – 2026: Waterford 0–10 - 5–12 London
  - **16 points** – 2024: Tipperary 1–12 - 3–22 Sligo

==== Scoring Events ====
- Most goals in a match:
  - **10** – 2023: Down 8–16 - 2–12 Laois
- Most points in a match:
  - **40** – 2026: Fermanagh 3–27 - 1–13 New York
- Most goals by one team in a match:
  - **8** – 2023: Down 8–16 - 2–12 Laois
- Most points by one team in a match:
  - **27** – 2026: Fermanagh 3–27 - 1–13 New York
- Highest aggregate score:
  - **58 points** – 2023: Down 8–16 - 2-12 Laois
- Lowest aggregate score:
  - **21 points** – 2024: Laois 0–11 - 0–10 Wicklow

==== Successful defending ====
Defending champions are promoted to the All-Ireland Senior Football Championship in the following year, and a number of teams maintained that status in the year beyond that. These are:

- Westmeath 1 attempts out of 1 (2024)
- Meath 1 attempts out of 1 (2025)

==== Gaps ====
- Longest gap between successive cup titles:
  - 0 years: N/A
- Longest gap between successive Tailteann Cup final appearances:
  - 2 years: Down (2024–2026)
- Longest gap between successive championship appearances
  - 3 years: Westmeath (2022–2025)

==== Active gaps ====
- Longest active gap since last title:
  - 4 years: Westmeath (2022–)
- Longest active gap since last cup final appearance:
  - 4 years: Westmeath (2022–), Cavan (2022–)
- Longest active gap since last cup appearance
  - 3 years: Cavan (2023–), Meath (2023–)

==== Provinces ====
- To date, the Tailteann Cup final has not involved two teams from the same province.
- The province providing the highest number of different winning teams is Leinster, with four:
  - Meath
  - Westmeath
  - Kildare
  - Wicklow
- Province success rates (of counties that have ever competed in the competition)
  - Leinster 44% (4 out of 9 counties)
  - Connacht 0% (0 out of 2 counties)
  - Munster 0% (0 out of 4 counties)
  - Ulster 25% (1 out of 4 counties)
  - Outside Ireland 0% (0 out of 2 counties)

==== Tailteann Cup final pairings ====
Pairing	Meetings	Last meeting
Cavan v Westmeath	1	2022
Down v Meath	1	2023
Down v Laois	1	2024
Kildare v Limerick	1	2025
Down v Wicklow	1	2026

==== Longest undefeated run ====
The record for the longest unbeaten run stands at 6 games held by Westmeath (2022–2025), Meath (2023–), Down (2024–) and Kildare (2025–)

==== Miscellaneous ====
- Best finish by a debuting team
  - Champions: Westmeath (2022), Meath (2023)
- Highest winning record
  - 100%, Meath (6 wins in 6 matches)
- Lowest winning record
  - 0%, New York (0 wins in 5 matches), Clare (0 wins in 2 matches)
- Most played match
  - 3, Down vs Laois (2023, 2024, 2026)

== Individual records ==
=== Top scorer ===
==== Overall ====
Year	Player	County	Tally	Total	Matches	Average
2022	John Heslin	Westmeath	1–25	28	4	7.0
2023	Pat Havern	Down	1–34	37	7	5.3
2024	Mark Barry	Laois	4–20	32	7	4.6
2025						

==== Final ====
Year	Player	County	Tally	Total	Opposition
2022	Ronan O'Toole	Westmeath	0–5	5	Cavan
2023	Jack O'Connor	Meath	1–2	5	Down
2024	Mark Barry	Laois	1–2	5	Down
2025					

=== Player of the Year ===
Year	Player	County
2022	Ronan O'Toole	Westmeath
2023	Mathew Costello	Meath
2024	Pat Havern	Down
2025	Alex Beirne	Kildare

=== Players with more than one appearance ===
- Seán Carrabine (2022, 2024; Sligo)
- Evan Lyons (2022, 2024; Sligo)
- Pierce Laverty (2023, 2024; Down)
- Odhran Murdock (2023, 2024; Down)
- Sam McCartan (2022, 2025; Westmeath)
- D Kirwan (2024, 2025; Kildare)

==== 2022 ====
1. Aidan Devaney (Sligo)
2. Jack Smith (Westmeath)
3. Kevin Maguire (Westmeath)
4. Evan Lyons (Sligo)
5. Jason McLoughlin (Cavan)
6. Ronan Wallace (Westmeath)
7. Killian Clarke (Cavan)
8. Sam McCartan (Westmeath)
9. Seán Carrabine (Sligo)
10. Gearóid McKiernan (Cavan)
11. Ronan O'Toole^{FOTY} (Westmeath)
12. Anton Sullivan (Offaly)
13. Gerard Smith (Cavan)
14. John Heslin (Westmeath)
15. Keith Beirne (Leitrim)

Reference: Tailteann Cup Team of the Year 2022

==== 2023 ====
1. Seán Brennan (Meath)
2. Adam O'Neill (Meath)
3. Pierce Laverty (Down)
4. Padraig Faulkner (Cavan)
5. Donal Keogan (Meath)
6. Padraic Harnan (Meath)
7. Danny Magill (Down)
8. Odhran Murdock (Down)
9. Conor Gray (Meath)
10. Jack Flynn (Meath)
11. Ross Dunphy (Carlow)
12. Liam Kerr (Down)
13. Jordan Morris (Meath)
14. Mathew Costello^{FOTY} (Meath)
15. Ruairí McCann (Antrim)

Reference: Tailteann Cup Team of the Year 2023

==== 2024 ====
1. Killian Roche (Laois)
2. Pierce Laverty (Down)
3. Ryan McEvoy (Down)
4. Kavan Keenan (Antrim)
5. Daniel Guinness (Down)
6. Brian Byrne (Laois)
7. Evan Lyons (Sligo)
8. Emmet Rigter (Limerick)
9. Odhran Murdock (Down)
10. Mark Barry (Laois)
11. Darragh Kirwan (Kildare)
12. Seán Carrabine (Sligo)
13. Niall Murphy (Sligo)
14. Evan O'Carroll (Laois)
15. Pat Havern^{FOTY} (Down)

Reference: Tailteann Cup Team of the Year 2024

==== 2025 ====
1. Josh Ryan (Limerick)
2. Harry O'Neill (Kildare)
3. Lee Cullen (Fermanagh)
4. Malachy Stone (Wicklow)
5. James McGrath (Kildare)
6. Iain Corbett (Limerick)
7. Sam McCartan (Westmeath)
8. Dean Healy (Wicklow)
9. Kevin Feely (Kildare)
10. James Naughton (Limerick)
11. Alex Beirne^{FOTY} (Kildare)
12. Danny Neville (Limerick)
13. Luke Loughlin (Westmeath)
14. Darragh Kirwan (Kildare)
15. Sean Nolan (Wexford)

Reference: Tailteann Cup Team of the Year 2025

== See also ==
- All-Ireland Senior Football Championship (Tier 1)
- All-Ireland Junior Football Championship (Tier 3)
- All-Ireland Senior B Football Championship (1990–2000)
- Tommy Murphy Cup (2004–2008)
