= 2026 Down county football team season =

Down county football team
2026 season
- Manager: Conor Laverty
- Stadium: Páirc Esler, Newry
- NFL D3: Champions
- Tailteann Cup: Runners-up
- Ulster SFC: Semi-finals
- Dr McKenna Cup: Group Stage

The following is a summary of Down county football team's 2026 season.

== Competitions ==
During pre-season Down competed in the McKenna Cup, with the main season consisting of the National Football League Division 3, the Ulster Championship and either the Tailteann Cup or the All-Ireland Senior Football Championship.

== Dr McKenna Cup ==
The draw for the 2026 Dr McKenna Cup took place on 2 December 2025.

=== Table ===
Pos	Team	Pld	W	D	L	PF	PA	PR	Pts	Qualification
1	Tyrone	2	2	0	0	37	31	1.194	4	Advance to semi-final
2	Down (Note: Armagh defeated Down by 3-10 to 0-10, but the result was reversed due to the fielding of ineligible players.)	2	1	0	1	14	18	0.778	2	
3	Armagh	2	0	0	2	17	19	0.895	0	

Source: Ulster GAA

=== Fixtures ===
7 January 2026 Group Stage	Armagh	3-10 - 0-10	Down	Armagh
19:30 IWT (UTC)	O O’Neill (1-2), T Kelly (1-1), S Conlon (1-1), B Hughes (0-1), J McElroy (0-1), D Magee (0-1), C McConville (0-1), R Duffy (0-1)	Report	P Havern (0-3), S Loughran (0-2), D Guinness (0-1), T Close (0-1), E Brown (0-1), A Crimmins (0-1), P McPolin (0-1)	Stadium: Athletic Grounds; Referee: James Lewis (Fermanagh)

11 January 2026 Group Stage	Tyrone	0-18 - 1-11	Down	Pomeroy
13:30 IWT (UTC)	Ethan Jordan (0-7), Michael Conroy (0-4), Mattie Donnelly (0-3), Joseph Oguz (0-1), Joey Clarke (0-1), Ronan Cassidy (0-1), Aidan Donaghy (0-1)	Report	Pat Havern (0-8), Donal Scullion (1-1), John McGeough (0-1), Daniel Guinness (0-1)	Stadium: Plunkett Park; Referee: Conor Dourneen (Cavan)

== National Football League Division 3 ==
Official fixtures for the 2026 National League were announced on 4 December 2025.

=== Fixtures ===
Win Draw Loss Postponed/Cancelled

Date	Round	Home	Score	Away	Ground	Ref
Saturday 24 January	Group	Down	2-19 v 2-14	Clare	Pairc Esler, Newry	
Saturday 31 January	Group	Limerick	1-14 v 0-18	Down	Páirc na nGael, Limerick	
Saturday 14 February	Group	Down	2-15 v 1-15	Westmeath	Pairc Esler, Newry	
Sunday 22 February	Group	Wexford	1-19 v 1-29	Down	Wexford Park, Wexford	
Saturday 28 February	Group	Down	1-18 v 1-15	Fermanagh	Pairc Esler, Newry	
Sunday 15 March	Group	Sligo	0-21 v 2-25	Down	Markievicz Park, Sligo	
Sunday 22 March	Group	Down	0-24 v 2-22	Laois	Pairc Esler, Newry	
Saturday 28th March	Final	Down	0-21 v 0-18	Wexford	Croke Park, Dublin	

=== Table ===
Pos	Team	Pld	W	D	L	PF	PA	PD	Pts	Qualification
1	Down	7	6	0	1	172	144	+28	12	Advance to NFL Division 3 Final and promotion to 2027 NFL Division 2
2	Wexford	7	5	0	2	142	125	+17	10	Advance to NFL Division 3 Final and promotion to 2027 NFL Division 2
3	Westmeath	7	4	0	3	162	141	+21	8	
4	Laois	7	3	1	3	131	130	+1	7	
5	Sligo (Note: Sligo are ranked ahead of Clare as they won the head-to-head game between the two teams.)	7	3	0	4	133	146	−13	6	
6	Clare	7	3	0	4	163	159	+4	6	
7	Limerick	7	2	1	4	119	146	−27	5	Relegation to 2027 NFL Division 4
8	Fermanagh	7	1	0	6	119	150	−31	2	Relegation to 2027 NFL Division 4

Source: GAA.ie
Rules for classification: Tiebreakers

=== Reports ===
24 January 2026
18:00
Round 1

Down	2-19 - 2-14	Clare
P Havern (0-06), O Murdock (1-02), D Guinness (0-05), J McGeough (1-01), C Doherty (0-03), S Annett (0-01), A Crimmins (0-01)	Report	M McInerney (1-03), C Brennan (1-00), D Bohannon (0-02), D Coughlan (0-02), S Ryan (0-02), A Griffin (0-02), B McNamara (0-02), C Murray (0-01)

Pairc Esler, Newry
Referee: Conor Dourneen (Cavan)
31 January 2026
14:00
Round 2

Limerick	1-14 - 0-18	Down
Eliah O’Riordan (0-05), James Naughton (0-04f), Danny Neville (1-00), Robbie Childs (0-02), Barry Coleman (0-01), Andrew Meade (0-01), Paul Maher (0-01)	Report	Daniel Guinness (0-05), Pat Havern (0-03), Ceilum Doherty (0-03), Shane Annett (0-02), Pearse McPolin (0-02), Odhran Murdock (0-01), Ryan McEvoy (0-01), Jamie Doran (0-01)

Páirc na nGael, Limerick
Referee: Fergal Kelly (Longford)
14 February 2026
18:00
Round 3

Down	2-15 - 1-15	Westmeath
J McGeough (1-01), C Doherty (0-04), R Magill (1-00), D Guinness (0-03), O Murdock (0-03), A Crimmins (0-03), P McPolin (0-01)	Report	L Loughlin (0-06), B Cooney (1-01), R Forde (0-03), R Connellan (0-02), S McCartan (0-01), R Wallace (0-01), S Baker (0-01)

Pairc Esler, Newry
Referee: Conor Dourneen (Cavan)
22 February 2026
14:00
Round 4

Wexford	1-19 - 1-29	Down
Darragh Brooks (0-08), Eoin Porter (1-00), Eoghan Nolan (0-03), Cathal Kehoe (0-02), Mark Rossiter (0-02), Tom Byrne (0-01), Seán Nolan (0-01), Jack Higgins (0-01), Páraic Hughes (0-01)	Report	Pat Havern (0-14), Odhran Murdock (0-06), Daniel Guinness (0-04), John McGeough (1-00), Ronan Burns (0-02), Jamie Doran (0-02), Eamon Brown (0-01)

Wexford Park, Wexford
Referee: Anthony Nolan (Wicklow)
28 February 2026
18:00
Round 5

Down	1-18 - 1-15	Fermanagh
Pat Havern (0-07), Odhran Murdock (1-02), Adam Crimmins (0-04), Callum Rogers (0-02), Ceilum Doherty (0-01), Liam Kerr (0-01), Eamonn Brown (0-01)	Report	Darragh McGurn (0-05), Ronan McCaffrey (1-01), Garvan Jones (0-02), Conor Love (0-02), Luke Flanagan (0-01), Cian O’Brien(0-01), Declan McCusker (0-01), Ciaran Corrigan (0-01), Mattie McDermott (0-01)

Pairc Esler, Newry
Referee: Sean Lonergan (Tipperary)
15 March 2026
14:00
Round 6

Sligo	0-21 - 2-25	Down
Alan McLoughlin (0-6), Lee Deignan (0-04), David Quinn (0-04), Niall Murphy (0-03), Luke Towey (0-01), Jack Lavin (0-01), Daire O’Boyle (0-01), Cian Lally (0-01)	Report	Pat Havern (1-10), Ceilum Doherty (1-03), Daniel Guinness (0-06), Odhran Murdock (0-02), Adam Crimmins (0-02), Donal Scullion (0-01), Ryan McEvoy (0-01)

Markievicz Park, Sligo
Referee: Jonathan Hayes (Limerick)
22 March 2026
14:00
Round 7

Down	0-24 - 2-22	Laois
P Havern (0-11), J McGeough (0-03), O Murdock (0-03), E Brown (0-03), P Brooks (0-02), D Guinness (0-01), M Rooney (0-01)	Report	P Kingston (2-03), E O'Carroll (0-07), P Kirwin (0-03), K Roche (0-03), P O'Sullivan (0-02), B Byrne (0-01), R Coffey (0-01), R Murphy (0-01), D Galvin (0-01)

Pairc Esler, Newry
Referee: Barry Judge (Sligo)
28 March 2026
19:15
Final

Down	0-21 - 0-18	Wexford
Pat Havern (0-05), Odhran Murdock (0-05), Ceilum Doherty (0-04), Daniel Guinness (0-02), Miceal Rooney (0-01), Liam Kerr (0-01), Ryan McEvoy (0-01), Adam Crimmins (0-01), Ruairí McCormack (0-01)	Report	Mark Rossiter (0-06), Páiric Hughes (0-05), Jack Higgins (0-02), Liam Coleman (0-01), Niall Hughes (0-01), Seán Nolan (0-01), Dylan Furlong (0-01), Robbie Brooks (0-01)

Croke Park, Dublin
Referee: Thomas Murphy (Galway)

== Ulster Senior Football Championship ==
The draw for the 2026 Ulster Championship took place on 27 November 2025.

=== Fixtures ===
26 April 2026
15:00
Quarter Final

Donegal	1-21 v 3-21	Down
Michael Murphy (0-07), Oisin Gallen (0-05), Caolan McGonagle (1-00), Conor O’Donnell (0-03), Peadar Mogan (0-02), Jason McGee (0-02), Shea Malone (0-2)	Report	Pat Havern (0-07), Miceal Rooney (2-00), Daniel Guinness (1-03), Adam Crimmins (0-04), Odhran Murdrock (0-03), Ryan McEvoy (0-02), Caolan Mooney (0-01), Ceilum Doherty (0-01)

O'Donnell Park, Letterkenny
Referee: Paddy Neilan (Roscommon)
3 May 2026
16:00
Semi Final

Armagh	3-33 v 0-14	Down
C Turbitt (2-05), T McCormack (1-02), O Conaty (0-05), J Og Burns (0-04), O O’Neill (0-04), A Murnin (0-03), C McConville (0-03), D McMullen (0-02), A O’Neill (0-02), J Duffy (0-01), T Kelly (0-01), P McGrane (0-01)	Report	D Guinness (0-04), P Havern (0-02), R Magill (0-02), L Kerr (0-02), B O’Hagan (0-02), S Annett (0-01), O Murdock (0-01)

St Tiernach's Park, Clones
Referee: B Cawley (Kildare)

=== Bracket ===
Preliminary round

Quarter-finals

Semi-finals

Final

Derry
2-23

Antrim
1-13

Derry
3-23

Monaghan (a.e.t.)
1-30

Monaghan
0-27

Cavan
2-14

Monaghan
0-25

Armagh (a.e.t.)
2-28

Donegal
1-21

Down
3-21

Armagh
3-33

Armagh (a.e.t.)
1-17

Down
0-14

Tyrone
1-16

Fermanagh
1-24

Armagh
2-32

== Tailteann Cup ==
Down will compete in the Tailteann Cup for the fourth time, and will be the only former champions in the 2026 competition. The draw for the 2026 Tailteann Cup took place on 4 May 2026.

=== Fixtures ===
16 May 2026
18:00
Round 1

Down	1-27 v 0-16	Leitrim
R McCormack (1-03), P Havern (0-05), D Guinness (0-04), E Brown (0-03), C Doherty (0-03), M Rooney (0-03), R Burns (0-02), T Close (0-02), O Murdock (0-01), S Loughran (0-01)	Report	K Gaffey (0-05), P Honeyman (0-03), F McLoughlin (0-02), B Guckion (0-02), O McLoughlin (0-02), M Diffley (0-01), T Plunkett (0-01)

Pairc Esler, Newry
Referee: Thomas Murphy (Galway)
23 May 2026
18:00
Round 2A

Offaly	3-22 v 1-20	Down
Dylan Hyland (1-11), Shane Tierney (1-03), Jordan Hayes (0-05), Diarmuid Egan (1-00), Keith O'Neill (0-03)	Report	Pat Havern (0-05), Pearse McPollin (1-00), Ronan Burns (0-3), Shane Annett (0-02), Ceilum Doherty (0-02), Tom Close (0-02), Daniel Guinness (0-01); Caolan Mooney (0-01), Callum Rogers (0-01), Eamon Brown (0-01), John McGeogh (0-01), Ryan Magill (0-01)

O'Connor Park, Tullamore
Referee: Conor Lane (Cork)
7 June 2026
18:00
Round 3

Longford	1-15 v 4-18	Down
Oran Kenny (0-05), Dessie Reynolds (1-02), Joseph Hagan (0-03), Peter Lynn (0-01), Matthew Flynn (0-01), Paddy Moran (0-01), Dylan Farrell (0-01), Aaron Farrell (0-01)	Report	Eamon Brown (1-02), Ruari O’Hare (1-01), Eamon Brooks (1-00), Ryan McGill (1-00), Ronan Burns (0-03), Shane Annett (0-02), Odhran Murdock (0-02), Miceal Rooney (0-02), Pat Havern (0-02), Caolan Mooney (0-2), Jamie Doran (0-01), Órán Cunningham (0-01)

Pearse Park, Longford
Referee: Barry Tiernan (Dublin)
13 June 2026
16:00
Quarter Final

Laois	0-15 v 2-23	Down
Evan O'Carroll (0-6), Pa Kirwan (0-4), Kevin Swayne (0-2), Matthew Byron (0-2), Conor Heffernan (0-1)	Report	Eamon Brown (0-9), Ronan Burns (0-4), Odhran Murdock (0-4), Daniel Guinness (1-0), Jack Lacey (1-0, own goal), Miceal Rooney (0-2), Caolan Mooney (0-1), Callum Rogers (0-1), Ruairi McCormack (0-1), Pat Havern (0-1)

O'Moore Park, Portlaoise
Referee: Kieran Eannetta (Tyrone)
20 June 2026
15:00
Semi Final

Down	2-19 v 1-21	Fermanagh
Pat Havern (1-03), Eamon Brown (1-02), Caolán Mooney (0-02), Miceál Rooney (0-02), Odhran Murdock (0-02), Callum Rogers (0-02), Ronan Burns (0-02), Ruairí McCormack (0-01), Céilum Doherty (0-01), Daniel Guinness (0-01), Ryan McEvoy (0-01)	Report	Mattie McDermott (1-03), Ultan Kelm (0-05), Conor Love (0-04), Ronan McCaffrey (0-02), Darragh McGurn (0-02), Ciarán Corrigan (0-02), Josh Largo Ellis (0-01), Garvan Jones (0-01), Conor O'Hanlon (0-01)

Croke Park, Dublin
Referee: Fergal Kelly (Longford)

11 July 2026
15:30
Final

Down	2-16 v 1-21	Wicklow
Pat Havern (1-02), Ronan Burns (0-04), John McGeough (1-00), Céilum Doherty (0-03), Miceal Rooney (0-03), Shane Annett (0-01), Ruairí McCormack (0-01), Eamonn Brown (0-01)	Report	Dean Healy (1-01), Oisín McGraynor (0-04), Kevin Quinn (0-04), Eoin Darcy (0-04), Pádraig O'Toole (0-03), Mark Jackson (0-03), Christopher O'Brien (0-02)

Croke Park, Dublin
Referee: Barry Tiernan (Dublin)

=== Bracket ===
Preliminary quarter-final

Quarter-finals

Semi-finals

Final

Laois
0-15

Down
2-23

Down
2-19

Fermanagh
3-27

Fermanagh
1-21

New York
1-13

Fermanagh
2-25

Sligo
0-09

Down
2-16

Wicklow
1-21

Antrim
3-15

Wicklow
2-19

Wicklow
2-26

Offaly
4-15

Offaly
1-22

Wexford
1-17
