= 2026 Tailteann Cup =

Fifth edition of the Tailteann Cup

Tournament details
- Level: Tier 2
- Year: 2026
- Trophy: Tailteann Cup
- Date: 9 May – 11 July
- Teams: 17

Winners
- Champions: Wicklow (1st win)
- Manager: Oisín McConville
- Captain: Dean Healy
- Qualify for: 2027 All-Ireland Senior Football Championship

Runners-up
- Runners-up: Down
- Manager: Conor Laverty
- Captain: Pierce Laverty

Other
- Matches played: 28

The 2026 Tailteann Cup is the fifth edition of the Tailteann Cup, a Gaelic football competition contested by the seventeen county teams that did not qualify for the last 16 of the 2026 All-Ireland Senior Football Championship.

Kildare, the winners of the 2025 tournament, were not eligible to defend their title as winning the cup earnt them automatic entry into the 2026 All-Ireland Championship. Down, winners of the 2024 Tailteann Cup and 2026 NFL Division Three champions, return to the Tailteann Cup after one season as the only former champions in the competition.

Wicklow were the winners, defeating Down in the final.

== Format ==
The draw for the 2026 Tailteann Cup was made on 27 April 2026.

Seventeen teams will compete in the competition (including New York who enter at the preliminary quarter final stage), namely those that did not reach the final of their provincial championship and were not among the seven highest-ranked teams at the end of the 2026 National Football League.

- In round 1, the sixteen teams (not including New York) are drawn to play one opponent in an open draw.
  - The 8 winners progress to Round 2A
  - The 8 losers go to Round 2B
- In round 2B, the eight Round 1 losers play each other.
  - The 4 winners progress to Round 3
  - The 4 losers are eliminated
- In round 2A, the eight Round 1 winners play each other.
  - 3 of the winners progress to the quarter-finals
  - 1 of the winners (chosen at random) progresses to the preliminary quarter-final
  - The 4 losers go to Round 3
- In round 3, the four Round 2A losers play the four Round 2B winners.
  - The 4 winners progress to the quarter-finals
  - The 4 losers are eliminated.
- In the preliminary quarter-final, one Round 2A winner plays New York at home (unless it is London, in which case a neutral venue in Ireland will be used.)
  - The winner progresses to the quarter-finals
  - The loser is eliminated.
- In the quarter-finals, the four Round 3 winners play the three Round 2A winners and the preliminary quarter-final winner.
  - The 4 winners progress to the semi-finals
  - The 4 losers are eliminated.
- In the semi-finals, the four quarter-final winners are drawn against each other.
  - The 2 winners progress to the Tailteann Cup final
  - The 2 losers are eliminated.
- In the Tailteann Cup final, the two semi-final winners play each other at Croke Park.
  - The winners receive the Tailteann Cup and automatically qualify for the 2027 All-Ireland Senior Football Championship
  - The finalists are eliminated.

== Teams ==
Seventeen teams compete in the 2026 Tailteann Cup.

County	Tailteann	Provincial	All-Ireland	Position in 2025	Appearance
Antrim	—	1951	—	Preliminary quarter-finals	5th
Carlow	—	1944	—	Preliminary quarter-finals	5th
Clare	—	1992	—	—	1st
Down	2024	1994	1994	—	4th
Fermanagh	—	—	—	Semi-finals	5th
Laois	—	2003	—	Preliminary quarter-finals	5th
Leitrim	—	1994	—	Group stage	5th
Limerick	—	1896	1896	Final	4th
London	—	—	—	Group stage	5th
Longford	—	1968	—	Group stage	5th
New York	—	—	—	Preliminary quarter-finals	5th
Offaly	—	1997	1982	Quarter-finals	5th
Sligo	—	2007	—	Quarter-finals	4th
Tipperary	—	2020	1920	Group stage	5th
Waterford	—	1898	—	Group stage	5th
Wexford	—	1945	1918	Quarter-finals	5th
Wicklow	2026	—	—	Semi-finals	5th

== Fixtures and results ==
All throw-in times are UTC+1 (Irish Standard Time or British Summer Time).

=== Round 1 ===
The draw for round 1 was made on 27 April 2026.

9 May 2026 Round 1	Clare	1-14 (17) – (20) 1-17	Offaly	Ennis
16:00		(HT: 0-4 - 0-9)		Venue: Cusack Park
	Pts: Cormac Murray 1-2 (1tp), Brian McNamara 0-3, Aaron Griffin 0-3, Mark McInerney 0-2 (tp), Alan Sweeney 0-1, Cillian Brennan 0-1, Fionn Kelleher 0-1, Joe Rafferty 0-1	Report	Pts: Dylan Hyland 0-9 (2tp, 1tpf), Shane Tierney 1-0, Marcas Dalton 0-2, Keith O'Neill 0-2, Harry Plunkett 0-2, Nathan Poland 0-1, Jordan Hayes 0-1	Referee: Brendan Griffin (Kerry)

9 May 2026 Round 1	Wexford	2-19 (25) – (14) 1-11	Limerick	Wexford
18:00		(HT: 0-12 - 1-3)		Venue: Chadwicks Wexford Park
	Pts: Ben Brosnan 0-6 (2tp), Darragh Brooks 0-3 (1tp), Liam O'Connor 1-0, Michael Kinsella 1-0, Páraic Hughes 0-2, Tom Byrne 0-2, Seán Nolan 0-2, Glen Malone 0-1, Cathal Kehoe 0-1, Mark Rossiter 0-1, Robbie Brooks 0-1	Report	Pts: James Naughton 0-4 (2tpf), Barry Coleman 0-3 (1tp), Mark McCarthy 1-0, Eliah Riordan 0-2 (tp), Rory O'Brien 0-1, Cillian Fahy 0-1	Referee: Séamus Mulhare (Laois)

10 May 2026 Round 1	Sligo	1-12 (15) – (17) 0-17	Tipperary	Sligo
12:45		(HT: 1-4 - 0-11)		Venue: Markievicz Park
	Pts: Niall Murphy 0-4 (1f), Pat Spillane 0-4 (2tp), Lee Deignan 1-0, Gavin Gorman 0-1, Darragh Cummins 0-1, Alan McLoughlin 0-1 (f), Shane Deignan 0-1	Report	Pts: Seán O'Connor 0-6 (2tp), Charlie King 0-2, Micheál Freaney 0-2 (tp), Cian Smith 0-2 (1f), Daithí Hogan 0-2 (tp), Emmet Moloney 0-1, Joe Higgins 0-1, Eoin Craddock 0-1	Referee: Kieran Eannetta (Tyrone)

10 May 2026 Round 1	Carlow	2-26 (32) – (35) 6-17 (a.e.t.)	Antrim	Carlow
13:30		(HT: 0-7 - 2-10) (FT: 2-22 - 4-16)		Venue: Dr Cullen Park
	Pts: Lee Walker 1-4 (1pen, 3f), Conor Crowley 0-6, Padraig Bolger 1-1, Ross Dunphy 0-3, Adam McCarron 0-3 (1tpf), Jamie Clarke 0-2, Chris Blake 0-2, Kyle Nolan 0-2 (tp), John Phiri 0-1, Paddy McDonnell 0-1, Liam Gavin 0-1 (f)	Report	Pts: Pat Shivers 1-5 (1tp, 1f), Ronan Boyle 2-0, Ryan McQuillan 1-3, Dominic McEnhill 0-4 (1tpf), Benen Kelly 1-0, Eoghan McCabe 1-0, Niall Burns 0-3, Joseph Finnegan 0-1, Tomás McCann 0-1	Referee: Conor Dourneen (Cavan)

10 May 2026 Round 1	Laois	1-23 (26) – (19) 0-19	Wicklow	Portlaoise
14:00		(HT: 1-15 - 0-6)		Venue: O'Moore Park
	Pts: Evan O'Carroll 1-6 (1tpf), Matthew Byron 0-4 (1tpf), Ronan Coffey 0-3 (1tp), Pa Kirwan 0-3, Paul Kingston 0-2 (2f), Kevin Swayne 0-2, Daragh Galvin 0-1, Rob Tyrrell 0-1, Cian Nolan 0-1	Report	Pts: Mark Jackson 0-6 (3tpf), Oisin McGraynor 0-3 (2f), Eoin Darcy 0-3 (3f), Dean Healy 0-2 (tp), Eoin Murtagh 0-2 (tp), Mark Kenny 0-2, Joe Prendergast 0-1	Referee: Barry Tiernan (Dublin)

10 May 2026 Round 1	Waterford	0-10 (10) – (27) 5-12	London	Dungarvan
14:00		(HT: 0-4 - 4-1)		Venue: Fraher Field
	Pts: Alan Dunwoody 0-4 (2f), Michael O'Brien 0-3 (3f), Aaron Ryan 0-2, Stephen Curry 0-1	Report	Pts: Shay Rafter 1-2, Joe McGill 1-1, James Davis 1-1, David Gouldson 1-1, Finbarr Crowley 1-0, Henry Walsh 0-3 (2f), Kristian Healy 0-1, Liam Gallagher 0-1, Conor O'Donohue 0-1, Ciaran Diver 0-1	Referee: Seán Lonergan (Tipperary)

10 May 2026 Round 1	Fermanagh	1-24 (27) – (23) 2-17	Longford	Enniskillen
15:00		(HT: 1-9 - 1-10)		Venue: Brewster Park
	Pts: Conor Love 1-2, Darragh McGurn 0-4, Mattie McDermott 0-3, Ronan McCaffrey 0-2, Josh Largo Elis 0-2, Seán Cassidy 0-2, Stephen McGullion 0-2 (tp), Ciaran Corrigan 0-2, Shane McGuillion 0-1, Brandon Horan 0-1, Joe McDade 0-1, Garvan Jones 0-1 (f), Oisin Kelm 0-1	Report	Pts: Dylan Farrell 1-5 (2tp, 1'45), Matthew Carey 0-4 (1tp), Oisin O'Toole 1-0, Oran Kenny 0-3, Paddy Moran 0-2, Matthew Flynn 0-1, Joseph Hagan 0-1, Daniel Reynolds 0-1	Referee: Barry Cassidy (Derry)

16 May 2026 Round 1	Down	1-27 (30) – (16) 0-16	Leitrim	Newry
18:00		(HT: 0-12 – 0-8)		Venue: Páirc Esler
	Pts: Ruairí McCormack 1-3 (1tp), Patrick Havern 0-5 (1tp, 1f), Daniel Guinness 0-4 (1tp), Ceilum Doherty 0-3, Miceal Rooney 0-3, Eamon Brown 0-3, Ronan Burns 0-2 (tpf), Tom Close 0-2, Séamus Loughran 0-1, Odhran Murdock 0-1	Report	Pts: Killian Gaffey 0-5 (2tpf, 1'45), Paul Honeyman 0-3, Fergal McLoughlin 0-2, Ben Guckian 0-2 (1f), Oisin McLoughlin 0-2 (tp), Jack Kelly 0-1, Mark Diffey 0-1	Referee: Thomas Murphy (Galway)

=== Round 2 ===
The draw was held on 11 May 2026.

23 May 2026 Round 2A	London	1-14 (17) – (32) 1-29	Laois	South Ruislip
14:00		(HT: 0-07 – 1-11)		Venue: McGovern Park
	Pts: Joe McGill 0-5 (1tp, 1f), Shay Rafter 0-3, Ciaran Diver 0-3 (1tp, 1f), Michael O'Reilly 1-0, Henry Freeman 0-1, David Gouldson 0-1, Tighe Barry 0-1	Report	Pts: Evan O'Carroll 1-5 (1f), Paul Kingston 0-4 (1tp), Pa Kirwan 0-3 (1tp), Paddy O'Sullivan 0-3, Ronan Coffey 0-1 (1tp), Cian Nolan 0-2 (tp), Killian Roche 0-2 (2f), Simon Fingleton 0-2, Daragh Galvin 0-1, Brian Byrne 0-1, Conor Heffernan 0-1, Kevin Swayne 0-1, Mikie Dempsey 0-1	Referee: Fergal Kelly (Longford

23 May 2026 Round 2A	Offaly	3-22 (31) – (23) 1-20	Down	Tullamore
18:00		(HT: 2-13 – 1-11)		Venue: O'Connor Park
	Pts: Dylan Hyland 1-11 (1pen, 3tp, 2f), Shane Tierney 1-3, Jordan Hayes 0-5 (2tp), Keith O'Neill 0-3 (1tp), Diarmuid Egan 1-0	Report	Pts: Pat Havern 0-5 (1tp, 3f), Pearse McPolin 1-0, Ronan Burns 0-3 (1tpf, 1'45), Shane Annett 0-2, Ceilum Doherty 0-2, Tom Close 0-2, Caolan Mooney 0-1, Daniel Guinness 0-1, Ryan Magill 0-1, Callum Rogers 0-1, John McGeough 0-1, Eamon Brown 0-1	Referee: Conor Lane (Cork)

24 May 2026 Round 2A	Fermanagh	2-20 (26) – (19) 2-13	Wexford	Enniskillen
13:00		(HT: 0-12 – 0-05)		Venue: Brewster Park
	Pts: Darragh McGurn 0-7 (2tp), Stephen McGullion 2-0, Garvan Jones 0-4 (1f, 1tpf), Conor Love 0-2, Josh Largo Elis 0-2, Conor McGee 0-1, Mattie McDermott 0-1, Ciaran Corrigan 0-1, Conor O'Hanlon 0-1, Ronan McCaffrey 0-1	Report	Pts: Seán Ryan 2-0, Ben Brosnan 0-4 (2f), Paraic Hughes 0-3 (1tp), Darragh Brooks 0-1 (f), Glen Malone 0-1, Eoghan Nolan 0-1, Michael Kinsella 0-1, Seán Nolan 0-1 (f), Martin O'Connor 0-1	Referee: Kieran Eannetta (Tyrone); TV: GAA+

24 May 2026 Round 2A	Antrim	4-12 (24) – (18) 2-12	Tipperary	Belfast
15:15		(HT: 2-06 – 0-04)		Venue: Corrigan Park
	Pts: Ryan McQuillan 2-1, Ronan Boyle 1-0, Conor Hand 1-0, Paddy McAleer 0-2, Dominic McEnhill 0-2 (2f), Niall Burns 0-2, Tomas McCann 0-1, Eoghan McCabe 0-1, Marc Jordan 0-1, Tiernan McCormack 0-1, John McNabb 0-1	Report	Pts: Seán O'Connor 0-5 (1tpf, 3f), Steven O'Brien 1-1, Joe Higgins 1-0, James Morris 0-1, Paddy Creedon 0-2, Cian Smith 0-1, Paudie Feehan 0-1, Charlie King 0-1	Referee: Conor Dourneen (Cavan)

23 May 2026 Round 2B	Wicklow	4-17 (29) – (20) 2-14	Limerick	Aughrim
16:00		(HT: 2-06 – 2-10)		Venue: Echelon Park
	Pts: Dean Healy 1-2 (tp), Mark Jackson 0-4 (2tpf), Eoin Murtagh 1-0, Pádraig O'Toole 1-0, Malachy Stone 1-0, Eoin Darcy 0-3 (2f), Jonathan Carlin 0-2, Oisín McGraynor 0-2, Kevin Quinn 0-2, Tom Moran 0-1, Matt Nolan 0-1	Report	Pts: Danny Neville 1-3 (1tp), James Naughton 1-2 (1pen, 1f), Cillian Fahy 0-3 (1tp), Tony McCarthy 0-2, Barry Coleman 0-2 (tp), Eliah O'Riordan 0-1, Peter Nash 0-1 (f)	Referee: Niall Cullen (Fermanagh)

23 May 2026 Round 2B	Clare	1-18 (21) – (23) 2-17	Longford	Ennis
17:00		(HT: 0-07 – 0-08)		Venue: Cusack Park
	Pts: Aaron Griffin 0-7 (1tp), Mark McInerney 0-4 (1f, 1'45), Emmet McMahon 0-4 (1tp), Cillian Rouine 1-0, Dermot Coughlan 0-1, Fionn Kelleher 0-1, Alan Sweeney 0-1	Report	Pts: Dylan Farrell 1-7 (1tp, 1f), Oran Kenny 1-4 (1f, 1tp), Daniel Reynolds 0-2, Matthew Flynn 0-2 (tp), Paddy Moran 0-1, Aaron Farrell 0-1	Referee: Thomas Murphy (Galway)

23 May 2026 Round 2B	Leitrim	0-22 (22) – (16) 1-13	Carlow	Carrick-on-Shannon
17:30		(HT: 0-06 – 0-09)		Venue: Páirc Seán Mac Diarmada
	Pts: Paul Honeyman 0-8 (3tp), Killian Gaffey 0-6 (2tpf, 2'45), Ryan O'Rourke 0-2 (1f), Conor Quinn 0-1, Oisin McLoughlin 0-1, Mark Diffley 0-1, Keith Keegan 0-1	Report	Pts: Ross Dunphy 0-5 (2tp), Adam McCarron 0-3 (1tpf), Padraig Bolger 0-3 (1tp), Lee Walker 1-0, Paddy McDonnell 0-2, Conor Crowley 0-1	Referee: Liam Devenney (Mayo)

24 May 2026 Round 2B	Waterford	3-12 (21) – (29) 0-29	Sligo	Dungarvan
13:00		(HT: 0-07 – 0-19)		Venue: Fraher Field
	Pts: Aaron Ryan 1-2, Dermot Ryan 1-2, Liam Mulligan 1-0, Stephen Curry 0-2, Alan Dunwoody 0-2 (1f), Michael O'Brien 0-2, Caolan Mac Cathmhaoil 0-1, Adam Murray 0-1	Report	Pts: Lee Deignan 0-11 (3tp), Shane Deignan 0-5 (1tp), Niall Murphy 0-4 (1f), Darragh Cummins 0-2, Luke Towey 0-2, Jack Lavin 0-2, Cian Lally 0-2, Gavin Gorman 0-1	Referee: Brendan Griffin (Kerry)

=== Round 3 ===
Round 2A losers played the Round 2B winners. A draw determined the home team in each fixture.

6 June 2026 Round 3	London	0-16 (16) – (22) 2-16	Sligo	South Ruislip
13:00		(HT: 0-6 – 0-7)		Venue: McGovern Park
	Pts: Shay Rafter 6, Joe McGill 4 (1x2p), Ciaran Diver 2, Liam Gallagher 2, Daniel Clarke 1, Conor O’Donohue 1	Report	Gls: Canice Mulligan 1, Gavin Gorman 1 Pts: Lee Deignan 5 (1x2p), Niall Murphy 4 (3fs), Alan McLoughlin 3 (1x2p), Conor Walsh 1, Shane Deignan 1, Pat Spillane 1, Canice Mulligan 1	Referee: Séamus Mulhare (Laois)

6 June 2026 Round 3	Leitrim	1-12 (15) – (20) 0-20	Wexford	Carrick-on-Shannon
14:00		(HT: 0-0 – 0-14)		Venue: Páirc Seán Mac Diarmada
	Gls: Jack Kelly 1 Pts: Oisín McLoughlin 7 (3x2p, 1f), Jack Kelly 3, Ruairí O’Rourke 1, Mark Diffley 1	Report	Pts: Ben Brosnan 4 (2fs), Niall Hughes 3, Mark Rossiter 3 (1f), Glen Malone 2, Páiric Hughes 2, Eoghan Nolan 2 (2p), Darragh Brooks 2 (2pf), Robbie Brooks 1, Michael Kinsella 1	Referee: Barry Cassidy (Derry)

6 June 2026 Round 3	Wicklow	1-17 (20) – (12) 0-12	Tipperary	Aughrim
17:00		(HT: 1-3 – 0-7)		Venue: Echelon Park
	Gls: Kevin Quinn 1 Pts: Kevin Quinn 6 (1x2p), Oisin McGraynor 3 (2fs), Liam O’Neill 3 (1x2p), Pádraig O’Toole 2, Eoin Darcy 1, Joe Prendergast 1, Mark Kenny 1	Report	Pts: Sean O’Connor 5 (3fs, 1x2pf), Paddy Creedon 5 (1x2p), Steven O’Brien 2	Referee: Kieran Eannetta (Tyrone)

6 June 2026 Round 3	Longford	1-15 (18) – (30) 4-18	Down	Longford
18:00				Venue: Pearse Park
	Pts: Dessie Reynolds 1-2 (1tp), Oran Kenny 0-5 (1tpf), Joseph Hagan 0-3 (1tp), Peter Lynn 0-1, Matthew Flynn 0-1, Paddy Mora 0-1, Dylan Farrell 0-1 (f), Aaron Farrell 0-1	Report	Pts: Eamon Brown 1-2 (1f), Ruari O'Hare 1-1, Ryan McGill 1-0, Patrick Brooks 1-0, Ronan Burns 0-3 (1'45, 1tpf), Shane Annett 0-2, Odhran Murdock 0-2, Miceal Rooney 0-2, Pat Havern 0-2 (1f), Caolon Mooney 0-2, Jamie Doran 0-1, Órán Cunningham 0-1	Referee: Barry Tiernan (Dublin); TV: GAA+

=== Final stages ===
Preliminary quarter-final

Quarter-finals

Semi-finals

Final

Laois
0-15

Down
2-23

Down
2-19

Fermanagh
3-27

Fermanagh
1-21

New York
1-13

Fermanagh
2-25

Sligo
0-09

Down

Wicklow

Antrim
3-15

Wicklow
2-19

Wicklow
2-26

Offaly
4-15

Offaly
1-22

Wexford
1-17

In the preliminary quarter-final, one Round 2A winner was chosen at random to play New York at home.

The quarter-finals see the Round 2A and preliminary quarter-final winners drawn against the Round 3 winners; the draw took place on 8 June 2026. Fixtures cannot be repeated, so the pairings Fermanagh–Wexford, Laois–Wicklow and Offaly–Down could not occur.

The semi-final draw was held on 15 June; again, Offaly and Down could not be drawn together.

==== Preliminary quarter-final ====
6 June 2026 Preliminary quarter-final	Fermanagh	3-27 (36) – (16) 1-13	New York	Enniskillen
15:00		(HT: 1-13 – 1-6)		Venue: Brewster Park
	Gls: Darragh McGurn 1, Mattie McDermott 1, Aogan Kelm 1 Pts: Joe McDade 4, Darragh McGurn 3, Mattie McDermott 2 (1f), Conor Love 3, Ronan McCaffrey 3, Garvan Jones 3 (1x2pf), Sean McNally 3 (all 45's), Conor O’Hanlon 3 (1x2p), Shane McGullion 1, Conor McGee 1, Ultan Kelm 1	Report	Gls: Killian Butler 1 Pts: Frank O’Reilly 7 (2x2pf, 1x2p), Jack McKenna 2, Conor Keenan 1, Jimmy O’Grady 1, Tiarnan Mathers 1, Killian Butler 1	Referee: Sean Lonergan (Tipperary); TV: GAA+

==== Quarter-finals ====
13 June 2026 Quarter-final	Offaly	1-22 (25) – (20) 1-17	Wexford	Tullamore
13:00		(HT: 0-10 – 1-13)		Venue: O'Connor Park
	Gls: Jack Bryant 1 Pts: Keith O'Neill 4, Harry Plunkett 4 (1x2p), Jack McEvoy 3, Jack Bryant 3, Shane O'Toole Greene 3, Dylan Hyland 2fs, Shane Tierney 1, Cormac Egan 1, Lee Pearson 1	Report	Gls: Eoghan Nolan 1 Pts: Eoghan Nolan 3 (1x2p), Cathal Kehoe 2 (2p), Darragh Brooks 2 (2pf), Dylan Furlong 2 (2p), Glen Malone 2, Páraic Hughes 1, Niall Hughes 1	Referee: Séamus Mulhare (Laois); TV: GAA+

13 June 2026 Quarter-final	Antrim	3-15 (24) – (25) 2-19	Wicklow	Belfast
14:00		(HT: 1-7 – 0-9)		Venue: Corrigan Park
	Gls: Tiernan McCormack 1, Ryan McQuillan 1, Paddy McAleer 1 Pts: Conor Hand 4 (1x2p), Dominic McEnhill 2 (2p), Niall Burns 2, Pat Shivers 2 (1f), Marc Jordan 1, Eunan Walsh 1, Tiernan McCormack 1, Ryan McQuillan 1, Paddy McAleer 1,	Report	Gls: Oisín McGraynor 1, Eoin Darcy 1 Pts: Dean Healy 5 (1x2p), Oisín McGraynor 2fs, Mark Jackson 4 (2x2pf), Eoin Darcy 1f, Pádraig O'Toole 3, Kevin Quinn 2, Eoin Murtagh 1, Tom Moran 1, Eoin Darcy 1f	Referee: Thomas Murphy (Galway)

13 June 2026 Quarter-final	Laois	0-15 (15) – (31) 2-25	Down	Portlaoise
16:00		(HT: 0-10 – 1-16)		Venue: O'Moore Park
	Pts: Evan O'Carroll 6 (4fs), Pa Kirwan 4 (1x2p), Matthew Byron 2 (2p), Kevin Swayne 2, Conor Heffernan 1	Report	Gls: Daniel Guinness 1, Jack Lacey 1(og), Pts: Eamon Brown 9 (1x2p, 2fs), Ronan Burns 4 (2x2pf), Odhran Murdock 4 (1x2p), Miceal Rooney 2, Caolan Mooney 1, Ruairí McCormack 1, Callum Rogers 1, Pat Havern 1	Referee: Kieran Eannetta (Tyrone); TV: GAA+

13 June 2026 Quarter-final	Fermanagh	2-25 (31) – (9) 0-09	Sligo	Enniskillen
17:00		(HT: 1-12 – 0-5)		Venue: Brewster Park
	Gls: Mattie McDermott 1, Shane McGullion 1 Pts: Mattie McDermott 4 (1f), Ultan Kelm 4, Conor Love 3, Garvan Jones 3 (1f), Ronan McCaffrey 2, Seán McNally 2 (2pf), Conor O'Hanlon 2 (2p), Josh Largo Elis 1, Aogan Kelm 1, Seán Cassidy 1, Ciarán Corrigan 1, Shane McGullion 1	Report	Pts: Alan McLoughlin 4 (1f), David Quinn 2 (2pf), Niall Murphy 1, Shane Deignan 1, Lee Deignan 1	Referee: Conor Dourneen (Cavan)

==== Semi-finals ====
20 June 2026 Semi-final	Down	2-19 (25) – (24) 1-21	Fermanagh	Dublin
15:00		(HT: 2-13 – 1-09)		Venue: Croke Park
	Pts: Pat Havern 1-3 (1tp, 1f), Eamon Brown 1-2, Odhran Murdock 0-2 (tp), Ronan Burns 0-2 (tpf), Miceál Rooney 0-2, Callum Rogers 0-2, Caolan Mooney 0-2, Daniel Guinness 0-1, Céilum Doherty 0-1, Ruairí McCormack 0-1, Ryan McEvoy 0-1	Report	Pts: Mattie McDermott 1-3 (2f), Ultan Kelm 0-5 (2tp), Conor Love 0-4 (1tp, 1f), Darragh McGurn 0-2, Ronan McCaffrey 0-2, Ciarán Corrigan 0-2, Garvan Jones 0-1 (f), Josh Largo Ellis 0-1, Conor O'Hanlon 0-1	Referee: Fergal Kelly (Longford); Attendance: 9,854; TV: RTÉ2

20 June 2026 Semi-final	Offaly	4-15 (27) – (32) 2-26	Wicklow	Dublin
17:00		(HT: 3-11 – 1-9)		Venue: Croke Park
	Pts: Jack McEvoy 1-4, Keith O'Neill 0-4 (1f), Dylan Hyland 1-0, Marcus Dalton 1-0, Shane Tierney 1-0, Jordan Hayes 0-3, Jack Bryant 0-2, Harry Plunkett 0-1, Rory Egan 0-1	Report	Pts: Mark Jackson 0-6 (3tpf), Christopher O'Brien 0-6 (1tp), Oisín McGraynor 1-3 (1f), Eoin Darcy 1-2 (1f), Eoin Murtagh 0-2 (tp), Kevin Quinn 0-2, Dean Healy 0-1, Pádraig O'Toole 0-1, Jonathan Carlin 0-1, Joe Prendergast 0-1, Darragh Fee 0-1	Referee: Seán Lonergan (Tipperary); Attendance: 9,854; TV: RTÉ News

==== Final ====
11 July 2026 Final	Down	2-16 (22) – (24) 1-21	Wicklow	Dublin
15:30		(HT: 2-10 – 0-04)		Venue: Croke Park
	Pts: Pat Havern 1-2 (1f), Ronan Burns 0-4 (2tpf), John McGeough 1-0, Miceal Rooney 0-3 (1tp), Ceilum Doherty 0-3, Daniel Guinness 0-1, Shane Annett 0-1, Eamon Brown 0-1, Ruairí McCormack 0-1	Report	Pts: Dean Healy 1-1, Eoin Darcy 0-4 (1tp, 1f), Kevin Quinn 0-4, Oisín McGraynor 0-4 (1tp, 1f), Mark Jackson 0-3 (1tpf, 1'45), Pádraig O'Toole 0-3, Christopher O'Brien 0-2 (tp)	Referee: Barry Tiernan (Dublin); TV: RTÉ2

== Notable occurrences ==
- Clare played in the Tailteann Cup for the first time.
- Wicklow reached the Tailteann Cup final for the first time and won the Cup for the first time.
