= 2023 Tailteann Cup final =

Final match of the 2023 Tailteann Cup

- Event: 2023 Tailteann Cup
| Down | Meath |
| 0–14 (14) | 2–13 (19) |
- Date: 15 July 2023
- Venue: Croke Park, Dublin
- Man of the Match: Jack Flynn (Meath)
- Referee: Noel Mooney (Cavan)

The 2023 Tailteann Cup final was the second final of the Tailteann Cup and the culmination of the 2023 Tailteann Cup, the GAA's second-tier Gaelic football competition for county teams. The match was played at Croke Park in Dublin on 15 July 2023, between Meath and Down. The match was played prior to the All-Ireland Senior Football Championship semi-final between Dublin and Monaghan. It was televised live on RTÉ2 as part of The Sunday Game, presented by Joanne Cantwell from the Croke Park studio.

Meath won the match on a scoreline of 2–13 to 0–14.

== Paths to the final ==
=== Meath ===
| 13 May 2023 Group stage | Meath | 1–19 – 0–11 | Tipperary | Navan |
| 18:30 IST (UTC+1) |
| | Gls: Aaron Lynch 1 Pts: Aaron Lynch 3 (1f, 1m), Jordan Morris 4, Matthew Costello 3 (2f), Thomas O'Reilly 3, Jack O'Connor 2, Jack Flynn 1 (1f), Conor Gray 1, Donal Keogan 1, Donal Lenihan 1 | Report | Pts: Jack Kennedy 3 (2 '45), Michael O'Reilly 2 (1f, 1 '45), Steven O'Brien 2 (1m), Mark Russell 2 (0–1f), Liam McGrath 1, Colman Kennedy 1 | Referee: Brendan Griffin |

| 20 May 2023 Group stage | Waterford | 1–14 – 3–17 | Meath | Dungarvan |
| 18:30 IST (UTC+1) |
| | Gls: Darragh Corcoran 0–8 (0–7f), Jason Curry 1–0, Conor Murray 0–2, Dermot Ryan 0–2, Tom O'Connell 0–1 (0–1f), Jordan O'Sullivan 0–1 | Report | Gls: Matthew Costello 1–5 (0–3f), Aaron Lynch 0–6 (0–2f), Donal Lenihan 1–2 (0–1f, 0–1m), Jordan Morris 1–2 (0–1m), Eoghan Frayne 0–1, James McEntee 0–1 | Referee: Sean Lonergan |

| 3 June 2023 Group stage | Meath | 1–11 – 1–9 | Down | Dublin |
| 13:00 IST (UTC+1) |
| | Gls: Jordan Morris 1–3 (1–0 pen, 0–1m), Daithi McGowan 0–2 (0–1f, 0–1 '45), James McEntee 0–2, Jack Flynn 0–1 (0–1f), Donal Lenihan 0–1 (0–1f), Jack O'Connor 0–1, Matthew Costello 0–1 | Report | Gls: Pat Havern 0–5 (0–5f), Odhran Murdock 1–0, Liam Kerr 0–2 (0–1f), Niall Kane 0–1 (0–1 '45), Daniel Guinness 0–1 | Referee: Fergal Kelly |

| 17 June 2023 Quarter-final | Meath | 2–23 – 0–12 | Wexford | Navan |
| 16:00 IST (UTC+1) |
| | Gls: Aaron Lynch 1, Cathal Hickey 1 Pts: Jordan Morris 6 (1m), James McEntee 6, Aaron Lynch 2, Matthew Costello 4 (2f), Daithi McGowan 3, Jack Flynn 1, Eoghan Frayne 1 | Report | Pts: Mark Rossiter 2 (2f), Ben Brosnan 2 (2f), Eoghan Nolan 2, Eoin Porter 1, Glen Malone 1, Liam Coleman 1, Paraic Hughes 1, Richard Waters 1, Jonathan Bealin 1 | Referee: Brendan Griffin |

| 25 June 2023 Semi-final | Meath | 2–16 – 2–14 | Antrim | Dublin |
| 14:00 IST (UTC+1) |
| | Gls: Jordan Morris 1, Aaron Lynch 1 Pts: Sean Brennan; Adam O'Neill, Ronan Ryan, Harry O'Higgins; Donal Keogan, Padraic Harnan, Sean Coffey; Jack Flynn 2, Conor Gray 1; Jack O'Connor 1, James McEntee 1, Cathal Hickey 1; Jordan Morris 4, Mathew Costello 4, 1f, Aaron Lynch 2, 1m | Report | Gls: Patrick McBride 1, Dominic McEnhill 1 pen Pts: Michael Byrne 2 (1f, 1 '45); Ronan Boyle, Peter Healy, Eoghan McCabe; Patrick McCormick, Declan Lynch, Dermot McAleese 2; Cathal Hynds, Joseph Finnegan; Ruairi McCann (Creggan) 1, Adam Loughran 3, Marc Jordan; Patrick McBride 1, Ruairi McCann (Aghagallon) 1, Dominic McEnhill 3 (2f) | Referee: Barry Judge |

=== Down ===
| 13 May 2023 Group stage | Down | 2–14 – 1–6 | Waterford | Newry |
| 18:00 IST (UTC+1) |
| | Gls: Pat Havern 0–5 (0–2f, 0–1m), Andrew Gilmore 0–4 (0–2f), Eamon Brown 1–0, Odhran Murdock 1–0, Donagh McAleenan 0–2, Anthony Morgan 0–1, Shealan Johnston 0–1, Eugene Branagan 0–1 | Report | Gls: Conor Murray 1–0, Jason Curry 0–2 (0–2f), Darragh Corcoran 0–2, Jason Gleeson 0–1 (0–1f), Dermot Ryan 0–1 | Referee: Barry Cassidy |

| 21 May 2023 Group stage | Tipperary | 0–6 – 2–18 | Down | Thurles |
| 13:45 IST (UTC+1) |
| | Gls: Jack Kennedy 0–4 (0–1f), Sean O'Connor 0–2 | Report | Gls: Pat Havern 0–6 (0–5f), Shealan Johnston 1–1 (0–1f), Odhran Murdock 1–0, Danny Magill 0–3, Eamon Brown 0–2 (0–2f), Ceilum Doherty 0–2, Andrew Gilmore 0–1 (0–1f), Conor Francis 0–1, Ryan Johnston 0–1, Ross Carr 0–1 | Referee: Thomas Murphy |

| 3 June 2023 Group stage | Meath | 1–11 – 1–9 | Down | Dublin |
| 13:00 IST (UTC+1) |
| | Gls: Jordan Morris 1–3 (1–0 pen, 0–1m), Daithi McGowan 0–2 (0–1f, 0–1 '45), James McEntee 0–2, Jack Flynn 0–1 (0–1f), Donal Lenihan 0–1 (0–1f), Jack O'Connor 0–1, Matthew Costello 0–1 | Report | Gls: Pat Havern 0–5 (0–5f), Odhran Murdock 1–0, Liam Kerr 0–2 (0–1f), Niall Kane 0–1 (0–1 '45), Daniel Guinness 0–1 | Referee: Fergal Kelly |

| 10 June 2023 Preliminary quarter-final | Down | 1–20 – 1–12 | Longford | Newry |
| 19:00 IST (UTC+1) |
| | Gls: Danny Magill 1 Pts: Pat Havern 6 (2f), Rory Mason 3 (0–2f), Andrew Gilmore 3 (1f), Ross Carr 2 (1m), Eugene Branagan 2, Patrick McCarthy 1, Ceilum Doherty 1, Donagh McAleenan 1, Liam Kerr 1 | Report | Gls: Joe Hagan 1 Pts: Joe Hagan 3, Dylan Farrell 2 (1f, 1 '45), Darragh Doherty 2 (1m), Keelin McGann 2, Patrick Fox 1, Ryan Moffett 1, Dessie Reynolds 1 | Referee: Anthony Nolan |

| 17 June 2023 Quarter-final | Cavan | 0–15 – 1–17 | Down | Cavan |
| 17:15 IST (UTC+1) |
| | Pts: Oisin Brady 8 (4f, 2m), Padraig Faulkner 2, Gearóid McKiernan 1 (1f), Oisín Kiernan 1, Cian Madden 1, Tiarnan Madden 1, Brandon Boylan 1 | Report | Gls: Danny Magill 1 Pts: Pat Havern 5 (2f, 1m), Rory Mason 4 (1f), Liam Kerr 4, Danny Magill 1, Patrick McCarthy 1, Ryan Johnston 1, Shane Annett 1 | Referee: Seamus Mulhare |

| 25 June 2023 Semi-final | Down | 8–16 – 2–12 | Laois | Dublin |
| 16:00 IST (UTC+1) |
| | Gls: Danny Magill 2, Pat Havern 1, Liam Kerr 3, Rory Mason 1, Odhrán Murdock 1 Pts: Niall Kane 1 ('45); Míceal Rooney, Ceilum Doherty 2 (1m); Daniel Guinness, Pat Havern 3; Liam Kerr 2, Ryan Johnston 1, Eugene Branagan 3; Rory Mason 1 (1f); Odhrán Murdock 1, Shealan Johnston | | Gls: Mark Barry 2 (1 pen); Pts: Killian Roche 1 ('45); Trevor Collins, Robert Pigott, Seán Greene; Pádraig Kirwan, Mark Timmons, Patrick O’Sullivan; Kieran Lillis, Damon Larkin; James Finn, Paul Kingston 1, Mark Barry 6 (4f, 1m); Evan O'Carroll 1; Eoin Lowry 2 (1m), Colm Murphy | Referee: Barry Tiernan |

== Pre-match ==
As the match was played prior to the All-Ireland Senior Football Championship semi-final between Dublin and Monaghan, the demand for tickets for the final was high. Some Meath fans expressed their frustrations online at their inability to get a ticket through general release.

On 7 July, Cavan's Noel Mooney was named as referee for the final.

== Match ==
=== Summary ===
Down started much the brighter of the two, their eagerness to get the game going reflected in a four points to one lead, but a fortuitous Meath goal on 17 minutes changed the complexion of the game. Jack Flynn lobbed a shot in from distance with a point in mind, but the ball pounded off the upright and dropped in front of goal where it deflected off Ronan Jones and into the net.

Matthew Costello's second pointed free for Meath left them a point ahead approaching the interval but Liam Kerr levelled it up at 1–3 to 0–6 when he blasted over a great goal chance for Down. Down were reduced to 14 in the 29th minute when Ceilum Doherty was shown a black card for a pull down.

Back to back points from Down goalkeeper Niall Kane amounted to a solid start to the second-half for the favourites, but Cathal Hickey and Jones cancelled those scores out and Jack O'Connor, who was only on as a sub, put Meath into a 1–6 to 0–8 lead.

Flynn was the Man of the Match who nudged Meath to victory with four more terrific scores for the Royals, all coming in a crucial period around the hour mark as they set the seal on victory. O'Connor snatched Meath's second goal in the dying moments after a turnover in the Down defence, summing up the excellent work of the Meath backs.

=== Details ===
15 July 2023
15:00 IST (UTC+1)

| Down | 0–14 – 2–13 | Meath |
|---|---|---|
| Pat Havern 0–4 (0–3f), Niall Kane 0–2 (0–1f, 0–1 '45), Liam Kerr 0–2, Ryan Johnston 0–2, Ceilum Doherty 0–1, Odhran Murdock 0–1, Shealan Johnston 0–1, Andrew Gilmore 0–1 | Report | Jack O'Connor 1–2, Jack Flynn 0–4, Ronan Jones 1–1, Matthew Costello 0–3 (0–2f), Cathal Hickey 0–2, Jordan Morris 0–1 |

Croke Park, Dublin
Referee: Noel Mooney (Cavan)

| Down | Meath |

| 1 | Niall Kane |
| 2 | Patrick McCarthy | | (substituted off) 60' |
| 3 | Pierce Laverty (c) |
| 4 | Anthony Doherty | (yellow card) 70+4' |
| 5 | Miceal Rooney |
| 6 | Ceilum Doherty | 29' to 39' |
| 7 | Danny Magill | | (substituted off) 59' |
| 8 | Daniel Guinness | | (substituted off) 63' |
| 9 | Odhran Murdock |
| 10 | Shealan Johnston | | (substituted off) 56' |
| 11 | Liam Kerr |
| 12 | Rory Mason | | (substituted off) 43' |
| 13 | Eugene Branagan |
| 14 | Pat Havern |
| 15 | Ryan Johnston |
Substitutes:
| 16 | John O'Hare |
| 17 | Shane Annett | | (substituted in) 43' |
| 18 | Ryan McEvoy | | (substituted in) 63' |
| 19 | Ross Carr |
| 20 | Patrick Branagan | | (substituted in) 60' |
| 21 | Donagh McAleenan | | (substituted in) 56' |
| 22 | Gerard Collins |
| 23 | Andrew Gilmore | | (substituted in) 59' |
| 24 | Conor Poland |
| 25 | Peter Fegan |
| 26 | Ryan Magill |
Manager:
Conor Laverty

| 1 | Seán Brennan |
| 2 | Adam O'Neill |
| 3 | Ronan Ryan |
| 17 | Ciaran Caulfield | | (substituted off) 57' |
| 5 | Donal Keogan (c) |
| 6 | Padraic Harnan |
| 7 | Sean Coffey |
| 8 | Ronan Jones | (yellow card) 25' |
| 9 | Conor Gray |
| 19 | Cathal Hickey | (yellow card) 40' | (substituted off) 69' |
| 11 | James McEntee | | (substituted off) 53' |
| 20 | Jack Flynn |
| 13 | Jordan Morris | | (substituted off) 66' |
| 14 | Mathew Costello |
| 15 | Aaron Lynch | | (substituted off) 47' |
Substitutes:
| 16 | Harry Hogan |
| 4 | Harry O'Higgins | | (substituted in) 57' |
| 10 | Daithí McGowan | | (substituted in) 69' |
| 12 | Jack O'Connor | | (substituted in) 47' |
| 18 | Cillian O'Sullivan | | (substituted in) 53' |
| 21 | Eoghan Frayne |
| 22 | Michael Flood |
| 23 | Donal Lenihan | | (substituted in) 66' |
| 24 | Diarmuid Moriarty |
| 25 | Keith Curtis |
| 26 | Ben Wyer |
Manager:
Colm O'Rourke

Man of the Match:
Jack Flynn (Meath)

== Post-match ==
Meath captain Donal Keogan accepted the Tailteann Cup from GAA president Larry McCarthy in the Hogan Stand.

Huge crowds turned out for a homecoming event on 17 July in Páirc Tailteann, Navan from 7:30pm to welcome home the Tailteann Cup and the winning team, with supporters being urged to turn out wearing their green and gold.
