= 2026 Tailteann Cup final =

Final match of the 2026 Tailteann Cup

- Event: 2026 Tailteann Cup
Down	Wicklow
2-16 (22)	1-21 (24)
- Date: 11 July 2026
- Venue: Croke Park, Dublin
- Man of the Match: Dean Healy (Wicklow)
- Referee: Barry Tiernan (Dublin)
- Weather: 21 °C (70 °F), cloudy

The 2026 Tailteann Cup final was the fifth final of the Tailteann Cup and the culmination of the 2026 Tailteann Cup, the GAA's second-tier Gaelic football competition for county teams. The match was played at Croke Park in Dublin on 11 July 2026, Wicklow defeating Down.

The match was played before the All-Ireland semi-final between Louth and Mayo.

== Match ==
=== Details ===
11 July 2026 Final	Down	2-16 (22) – (24) 1-21	Wicklow	Dublin
15:30		(HT: 2-10 – 0-04)		Venue: Croke Park
	Pts: Pat Havern 1-2 (1f), Ronan Burns 0-4 (2tpf), John McGeough 1-0, Miceal Rooney 0-3 (1tp), Ceilum Doherty 0-3, Daniel Guinness 0-1, Shane Annett 0-1, Eamon Brown 0-1, Ruairí McCormack 0-1	Report	Pts: Dean Healy 1-1, Eoin Darcy 0-4 (1tp, 1f), Kevin Quinn 0-4, Oisín McGraynor 0-4 (1tp, 1f), Mark Jackson 0-3 (1tpf, 1'45), Pádraig O'Toole 0-3, Christopher O'Brien 0-2 (tp)	Referee: Barry Tiernan (Dublin); TV: RTÉ2

Down	Wicklow

GK	1	Ronan Burns
FB	2	Peter Fegan
FB	3	Pierce Laverty (c)
FB	20	Patrick McCarthy	(substituted off) 28'
HB	5	Callum Rogers	(substituted off) 48'
HB	6	Shane Annett
HB	21	Ruairí McCormack
MF	8	Ryan McEvoy
MF	9	Odhran Murdock
HF	10	Daniel Guinness
HF	11	Ceilum Doherty
HF	12	Miceal Rooney
FF	13	John McGeough	(substituted off) 53'
FF	14	Patrick Havern
FF	15	Eamon Brown	(substituted off) 64'
Substitutes:
	16	John O'Hare
	17	Finn McElroy
	18	Caolan Mooney	(substituted on) 28'
	19	Liam Kerr
	4	Patrick Brooks	(substituted on) 64'
	7	Ryan Magill	(substituted on) 48'
	22	Ross Carr
	23	Ruairí O'Hare	(substituted on) 53'
	24	Tom Close
	25	Oran Cunningham
	26	Barry O'Hagan
Manager:
Conor Laverty

GK	1	Mark Jackson
FB	2	Tom Moran
FB	3	Matt Nolan
FB	4	Malachy Stone
HB	5	Darragh Fee
HB	6	Eoin Murtagh	(substituted off) 54'
HB	7	Gavin Fogarty	(substituted off) 59'
MF	8	Dean Healy (c)
MF	9	Jack Kirwan	(substituted off) 52'
HF	10	Jonathan Carlin
HF	11	Pádraig O'Toole
HF	12	Christopher O'Brien
FF	13	Oisín McGraynor	(substituted off) 68'
FF	14	Kevin Quinn
FF	15	Eoin Darcy	(substituted off) 69'
Substitutes:
	16	Cathal Fitzgerald
	17	Mark Kenny	(substituted on) 59'
	18	Cian Deering	(substituted on) 54'
	19	Joe Prendergast	(substituted on) 52'
	20	Liam O'Neill	(substituted on) 59'
	21	John Paul Nolan	(substituted on) 69'
	22	Conall Ó Gallchobhair
	23	Jacques McCall
	24	Conor Fee
	25	Seán Murphy
	26	Cathal Baker
Manager:
Oisín McConville
