= Charlie Harrison (Gaelic footballer) =

Irish Gaelic footballer

Personal information
- Born: Sligo
- Height: 5 ft 11 in (180 cm)

Sport
- Sport: Gaelic football
- Position: Corner Back
Club
- Years: Club
- St John's
Inter-county
- Years: County
- 2004: London; Sligo
Inter-county titles
- Connacht titles: 1
- NFL: 2 Div 2 & 3
- All Stars: 1

Charlie Harrison is an Irish sportsperson from County Sligo. He plays Gaelic football for his club St John's and at senior level for the Sligo county team. In 2010, he was given an All Star, a particularly unusual achievement for a Sligo player. Only three others had managed this before him [Mickey Kearins, Barnes Murphy and Eamon O'Hara].

== Playing career ==
Harrison made his senior inter-county debut in 2004 playing for London while he was a student at St Mary's College Strawberry Hill. He played against Galway in the Connacht Championship and also against Dublin in the first round of qualifiers. It was Harrison's only year to play for London. Fellow Sligo player Brendan Egan also played for London that year.

Harrison won a Connacht Senior Football Championship medal for Sligo in 2007. That victory made Sligo the Connacht champions for the first time since 1975 and third time overall.

== All Star ==
In October 2010, Harrison was named in the 2010 All Stars football team as a result of his performances for Sligo during the 2010 season. He joined Michael Kearins (1971), Barnes Murphy (1974) and Eamon O'Hara (2002) on the list of Sligo footballers to have won All Star awards. Harrison was selected at left corner back in the All Star team rather than in his customary right corner back position. Speaking after hearing of the All Star he said "when I was called out I couldn't believe it. We were jumping up and down. I'm absolutely delighted, The All-Star is a really coveted award, but you never really think you will be up there someday, so to win one is an amazing feeling." He later picked up a GPA award.
