= Evan Lyons =

Sligo Gaelic footballer

Sport
- Sport: Gaelic football
Club
- Years: Club
- Shamrock Gaels
Inter-county
- Years: County
- Sligo

Evan Lyons is an Irish Gaelic footballer who plays for Shamrock Gaels and at senior level for the Sligo county team.

Lyons helped in getting Sligo past Leitrim in the 2022 FBD Insurance League, in what was the first inter-county game to get officially played indoors. Then in October he, Seán Carrabine and Aidan Devaney got a Tailteann Cup award, three for Sligo out of a total of 15.

== Honours ==
Individual

- Tailteann Cup Team of the Year (1): 2022
