= St John's GAA (Sligo) =

Sligo-based Gaelic games club

St John's
- Naomh Eoin
- Founded: 1987
- County: Sligo
- Nickname: John's
- Colours: Sky Blue and Navy
- Grounds: Stenson Park

Playing kits
Standard colours

St John's is a Gaelic Athletic Association club based in Carraroe and the eastern ward of Sligo, Ireland. It is one of the newer clubs in the county, having been formed in 1987 after a re-organisation of the GAA structures in the Sligo urban area. The club's grounds, formerly known as Cuilbeg, have been renamed Stenson Park in memory of former Sligo player and Curry/St John's club man Johnny Stenson, and were formally opened in October 2012 by GAA President Liam O'Neill.

In 2013, St John's seniors won ten games out of a possible eleven and contested the Division One League final for the very first time in their short history against Tourlestrane but lost. Currently the club fields Senior, Intermediate and Junior A teams and traditionally draws its players from Carraroe, Cairns Hill, Cranmore, Garavogue and Mail Coach Road which are predominantly areas from Sligo town.

St John's are yet to make an appearance in the Sligo Senior Football Championship final, but have made four semi-final appearances. The club have also won a Connacht Junior Club Football Championship title in 1999 when they defeated Monivea Abbeyknockmoy of Galway in the final in Tuam (Abbeyknockmoy had beaten St John's heavily in the group stage).

It is the first non-smoking club in Sligo, leading to chairman Seamus Casey being presented with an award by Dublin player Brian Fenton at Croke Park.

== Notable players ==
- Barnes Murphy – All Star: 1974
- Charlie Harrison – All Star: 2010
- David Rooney

== Achievements ==
- Sligo Senior Football League (Division 1):
  - Runners up 2013
- Connacht Junior Club Football Championship: (1)
  - 1999
- Sligo Intermediate Football Championship: (2)
  - 2000, 2017
- Sligo Junior Football Championship: (3)
  - 1989, 1999, 2013
- Sligo Junior B Football Championship: (3)
  - 2009, 2013, 2016
- Sligo Under 21 'B' Football Championship: (1)
  - 2004
- Sligo Under 20 Football Championship: (1)
  - 2011
- Sligo Minor Football Championship: (4)
  - 1998, 1999, 2002, 2006
- Sligo Under-16 Football Championship: (8)
  - 1998, 1999, 2000, 2002, 2003, 2005, 2008, 2009
- Sligo Under-14 Football Championship: (8)
  - 1962, 1964, 1994, 1995, 1997, 2001, 2003, 2007
- Sligo Senior Football League (Division 2): (1)
  - 2009
- Sligo Intermediate Football League Division 3 (ex Div. 2): (1)
  - 2006
- Sligo Junior Football League (Division 5): 93)
  - 1988, 1999, 2010
- Benson Cup: (1)
  - 2008
