= Burren GAA =

Gaelic Athletic Association club in Burren, County Down, Ireland

St Mary's Burren GAA
- CLG Naomh Mhuire, An Bhoirinn
- Founded: 1924
- County: Down
- Colours: Green and White (home); Green (away)
- Grounds: St Mary's Park, Burren
- Coordinates: 54.137545°N 6.262631°W

Playing kits
Standard colours

Senior Club Championships
| | All Ireland | Ulster champions | Down champions |
|---|---|---|---|
| Football: | 2 | 5 | 14 |

Burren GAA, also known as St Mary's Burren GAA (Irish: CLG Naomh Mhuire, An Bhoirinn), is a Gaelic Athletic Association club in Burren, County Down, Northern Ireland.

== Notable players ==
- Kevin McKernan
- Daniel McCartan
- Paddy O'Rourke - Down All Ireland Winning Captain 1991
- Brendan McKernan - Down All Ireland winner 1991 and 1994
- James McCartan Jnr - Won 2 All - Ireland senior medals with Down in 1991 and 1994, as well as 2 All star awards
- Declan Rooney, played in the 2010 All-Ireland SFC Final
- Stefan White
- John Treanor, known as "Shorty", played inter-county football for Down
- Odhran Murdock
- Liam Kerr
- Danny Magill

== Football titles ==
All-Ireland Senior Club Football Championship: 2

- 1985–86, 1988–89

Ulster Senior Club Football Championship: 5

- 1983, 1984, 1985, 1987, 1988

Down Senior Club Football Championship : 14

- 1966, 1981, 1983, 1984, 1985, 1986, 1987, 1988, 1992, 1996, 1997, 2010, 2011, 2018

Down Junior Football Championship

- 1930, 1952

U21 Ulster Club Football Champions Tournament

- 2009, 2010

Down All County Minor Championship : 6

- 1958, 1959, 1960, 1974, 1979, 1997, 2014, 2016, 2017

Ulster Club Minor Championship

2016

Ulster Under-16 Championship

- 2014, 2018 2025

All Ireland Elite Feile

2017
