= Seán Carrabine =

Sligo Gaelic footballer

Sport
- Sport: Gaelic football
Club
- Years: Club
- Castleconnor
Inter-county
- Years: County
- Sligo

Seán Carrabine is a Gaelic footballer who plays for Castleconnor and at senior level for the Sligo county team.

A midfielder, he scored a goal away to New York in the 2022 Connacht Senior Football Championship; Sligo won the game by four points, with Carrabine's goal worth three. He helped Sligo past Leitrim and into Croke Park in the 2022 Tailteann Cup and was named on the Team of the Week afterwards. In October, he was named on the Tailteann Cup Team of the Year; teammates Evan Lyons and Aidan Devaney were also included, giving Sligo three out of the total of fifteen positions.

== Honours ==
Individual

- Tailteann Cup Team of the Year (1): 2022
