= Brian Flanagan (Gaelic footballer) =

Irish Gaelic football manager and footballer (born 1985)

Personal information
- Native name: Briain Ó Flannagáin (Irish)
- Born: Kildare, Ireland
- Height: 5 ft 11 in (180 cm)

Sport
- Sport: Gaelic football
- Position: Centre back
Club
- Years: Club
- 2000s-2014: Johnstownbridge
Inter-county
- Years: County
- 2007-2014: Kildare
Inter-county titles
- NFL: 1

Brian Flanagan (born 1985) is an Irish Gaelic football manager and former footballer. He is currently the manager of the Kildare Senior Football Team.

Flanagan previously managed the Kildare Under-20 team and the Johnstownbridge, Kildare Juniors and DIT Sigerson teams. He has also been involved with Summerhill and the Westmeath Seniors.

== Playing career ==
Flanagan made his debut for Kildare in the National Football League in 2007. He was a key player in their run to the All-Ireland Semi-Final in 2010. He was part of the Kildare squad that won the National Football League Division 2 in 2012.

He was forced to retired due to a knee injury in 2014 at the age of 29.

== Managerial career ==
Having coached the Kildare Junior team a year previously, Flanagan joined Cian O'Neill's Kildare team as a coach in 2016.

Flanagan took over the Kildare Under-20 team in 2020 on a two year basis. The team won back to back Leinster titles in 2022 and 2023 defeating Dublin both times. They reached the All-Ireland final in 2022, losing to Tyrone but eventually beat Sligo to win the competition a year later in 2023.

He later joined the backroom team of Summerhill as they won the Meath SFC title in 2023 for the first time in 10 years.

In August 2024, he was announced as the new manager of the Kildare Senior Football Team for a term of four years after Glenn Ryan Stepped down from the role. Joining him as a coach was Aidan O'Rourke from Armagh. Former Kildare players Damien Hendy and Daryl Flynn joined as selectors also.

His first campaign as Kildare Manager started well leading Kildare to top Division 3 in the National League only to lose by two points in the finals against their neighbours Offaly.

Flanagan's Kildare team claimed the Tailteann Cup title for the first time in 2025, beating Limerick in a tight-fought final.

== Honours ==
=== Player ===
- National Football League Division 2: 2012

=== Manager ===
- Tailteann Cup: 2025
