= Castleconnor GAA =

Sligo-based Gaelic games club

Castleconnor
- Caislean Uí Conchubhair
- County: Sligo
- Colours: Red and White
- Grounds: St Brendan's Park

Playing kits
Standard colours

Castleconnor GAA are a Gaelic Athletic Association club based in rural western County Sligo along the Sligo-Mayo border in Ireland. Castleconnor play in the Sligo Intermediate Championship and in Sligo League Division 2 and field underage football teams.

== Notable players ==
- Seán Carrabine
- Kevin McDonnell, Sligo senior captain at the age of 23

== Honours ==
- Sligo Intermediate Football Championship:
  - 1998
- Sligo Junior Football Championship:
  - 1980, 1985, 2002
- Sligo Superleague Championship:
  - 2004 (First Sligo county final under floodlights v Bunninadden)
- Sligo Senior Football League (Division 2):
  - 1990, 1992, 1998, 2004, 2018
- Sligo Junior Football League (Division 5):
  - 1985
- Sligo U21 B Championship:
  - 2016, 2014
