= David Rooney (Gaelic footballer) =

Irish Gaelic footballer

Personal information
- Born: 1990 (age 35–36) County Sligo

Sport
- Sport: Gaelic football
- Position: Wing forward
Club
- Years: Club
- 2009-: St John's
Inter-county
- Years: County
- 2011-: Sligo
Inter-county titles
- Connacht titles: 0
- All-Irelands: 0
- NFL: 0
- All Stars: 0

David Rooney is a Gaelic footballer playing for the Sligo county team. Rooney made his senior debut in the 2011 against Leitrim, which proved to be a shock as Sligo were knocked out.
