= 2025 Tailteann Cup final =

Final match of the 2025 Tailteann Cup

- Event: 2025 Tailteann Cup
Kildare	Limerick
1–24 (27)	2–19 (25)
- Kildare win the Tailteann Cup and qualify automatically for the last 16 of the 2026 All-Ireland Senior Football Championship
- Date: 12 July 2025
- Venue: Croke Park, Dublin
- Man of the Match: Darragh Kirwan (Kildare)
- Referee: Liam Devenney
- Weather: Sunny, 27 °C (81 °F)

The 2025 Tailteann Cup final was the fourth final of the Tailteann Cup and the culmination of the 2025 Tailteann Cup, the GAA's second-tier Gaelic football competition for county teams. The match was played at Croke Park in Dublin on 12 July 2025, between Kildare and Limerick.

The match was played before the All-Ireland semi-final between Kerry and Tyrone. Kildare won the game by two points.

== Paths to the final ==
Kildare
Round	Date	Opponent	Venue (H/A/N)	Result	Victory margin	Score	Ref
Group game	10 May 2025	Leitrim	St Conleth's Park (H)	Win	25	0-36 to 0-11	
Group game	17 May 2025	Tipperary	Clonmel (A)	Win	14	3–19 to 1-11	
Group game	1 June 2025	Sligo	Dr. Hyde Park (N)	Win	4	4-19 to 1-24	
Quarter-final	14 June 2025	Offaly	St Conleth's Park (H)	Win	1	1-17 to 0-19	
Semi-final	22 June 2025	Fermanagh	Croke Park (N)	Win	7	1-13 to 0-9	

Limerick
Round	Date	Opponent	Venue (H/A/N)	Result	Victory margin	Score	Ref
Group game	10 May 2025	London	Newcastle West (H)	Win	7	0-25 to 1-15	
Group game	17 May 2025	Antrim	Corrigan Park (A)	Win	8	1-18 to 1-10	
Group game	31 May 2025	Westmeath	O'Moore Park (N)	Win	1	0-19 to 0-18	
Quarter-final	15 June 2025	Wexford	Gaelic Grounds (H)	Win	8	4-21 to 2-19	
Semi-final	22 June 2025	Wicklow	Croke Park (N)	Win	4	2-18 to 1-17	

== Match ==
=== Details ===
12 July 2025
14:30 IST (UTC+1)

Kildare	1–24 (27) – (25) 2–19	Limerick
Darragh Kirwan 0-8 (2 tp), Alex Beirne 1-2, Ryan Sinkey 0-3, Brian McLoughlin 0-3 (1 tp), Callum Bolton 0-2 (tp), Kevin Feely 0-2 (1f), Colm Dalton 0-2, Tommy Gill 0-1, Daniel Flynn 0-1.	Report	Cillian Fahy 1-1, Killian Ryan 1-1, Tony McCarthy 0-3, Josh Ryan 0-3 (1tpf, 1 45), Peter Nash 0-3 (1f), Emmet Rigter 0-2, James Naughton 0-2fs, Danny Neville 0-1, Tommie Childs 0-1, Iain Corbett 0-1, Rory O’Brien 0-1

Croke Park, Dublin
Referee: Liam Devenney
