= 2025 Tailteann Cup =

Fourth edition of the Tailteann Cup

Tournament details
- Level: Tier 2
- Year: 2025
- Trophy: Tailteann Cup
- Date: 10 May – 12 July 2025
- Teams: 17

Winners
- Champions: Kildare (1st win)
- Manager: Brian Flanagan
- Captain: Kevin Feely
- Qualify for: Last 16 of 2026 All-Ireland Senior Football Championship

Runners-up
- Runners-up: Limerick
- Manager: Jimmy Lee
- Captain: Cillian Fahy

Other
- Matches played: 35

The 2025 Tailteann Cup was the fourth edition of the Tailteann Cup, a Gaelic football competition contested by the seventeen county teams that did not qualify for the last 16 of the 2025 All-Ireland Senior Football Championship.

Kildare were the winners, defeating Limerick in the final. Kildare will thus qualify automatically for the last 16 of the 2026 All-Ireland Senior Football Championship.

== Format ==
The 17 teams who compete in the 2025 All-Ireland Senior Football Championship but did not qualify for the round-robin group stages competed in the competition.

New York advanced directly to the preliminary quarter-finals. The other 16 teams were drawn into four groups of four teams. Seeding was determined by placing in the 2025 National Football League (after promotion and relegation was applied and after NFL division finals).

Each team in a group played the other teams in their group once; each team getting one home fixture, one away and one neutral. Teams are awarded two points for a win and one point for a draw.

The four preliminary quarter-finals consisted of:

- The four second-placed teams (home), against
- New York and the three third-placed teams with the best record (away).

At the quarter-final stage the four group winners played the four preliminary quarter-final winners.

The semi-finals and final were played in Croke Park. All knock-out matches were "winner on the day". The key prize for the winner of the 2026 Tailteann Cup was to qualify for the group stage of 2026 All-Ireland Senior Football Championship regardless of their league position.

== Teams ==
=== General information ===
Seventeen county teams competed in the Tailteann Cup. Only one, Westmeath, does so as a previous winner of the cup.

County	Tailteann	Provincial	All-Ireland	Position in 2024	Appearance
Antrim	—	1951	—	Semi-final	4th
Carlow	—	1944	—	Group stage	4th
Fermanagh	—	—	—	Quarter-finals	4th
Kildare	—	2000	1928	Quarter-finals	2nd
Laois	—	2003	—	Final	4th
Leitrim	—	1994	—	Preliminary quarter-finals	4th
Limerick	—	1896	1896	Quarter-finals	3rd
London	—	—	—	Preliminary quarter-finals	4th
Longford	—	1968	—	Group stage	4th
Offaly	—	1997	1982	Group stage	4th
New York	—	—	—	Preliminary quarter-finals	4th
Sligo	—	2007	—	Semi-final	3rd
Tipperary	—	2020	1920	Preliminary quarter-finals	4th
Waterford	—	1898	—	Group stage	4th
Wexford	—	1945	1918	Group stage	4th
Wicklow	—	—	—	Quarter-finals	4th
Westmeath	2022	2004	—	—	2nd

== Draws ==
=== Group stage seeding ===
Numbers in brackets indicate ranking in the 2025 NFL.

Pot 1

- Offaly (15)
- Kildare (16)
- Westmeath (18)
- Fermanagh (20)

Pot 2

- Sligo (21)
- Laois (22)
- Limerick (23)
- Wexford (24)

Pot 3

- Antrim (25)
- Leitrim (26)
- Wicklow (27)
- Carlow (28)

Pot 4

- Tipperary (29)
- Longford (30)
- Waterford (31)
- London (32)

New York (did not play in NFL) enter the Tailteann Cup at the preliminary quarter-final stage.

=== Knockout stage seeding ===
The preliminary quarter-final draw took place on 1 June 2025. The quarter-final draw is on 9 June. The semi-final draw is on 16 June.

Seeded into quarter-finals

- Fermanagh
- Kildare
- Limerick
- Wicklow

Unseeded in quarter-finals

- Offaly
- Sligo
- Westmeath
- Wexford

Seeded into preliminary quarter-finals

- Offaly
- Sligo
- Westmeath
- Wexford

Unseeded in preliminary quarter-finals

- Antrim
- Carlow
- Laois
- New York

== Group stage ==
=== Group 1 ===
Pos	Team	Pld	W	D	L	PF	PA	PD	Pts	Qualification
1	Kildare	3	3	0	0	95	52	+43	6	Advance to quarter-final
2	Sligo	3	2	0	1	73	68	+5	4	Advance to preliminary quarter-final
3	Leitrim	3	1	0	2	50	71	−21	2	
4	Tipperary	3	0	0	3	40	67	−27	0	

Source: GAA

==== Round 1 ====
10 May 2025 Tailteann Cup	Kildare	0-36 – 0-11	Leitrim	Newbridge
				Venue: St Conleth's Park
		Report		Referee: Liam Devenney

11 May 2025 Tailteann Cup	Sligo	2-15 – 2-10	Tipperary	Tubbercurry
		Report		Referee: Sean Hurson

==== Round 2 ====
17 May 2025 Tailteann Cup	Tipperary	1-11 – 3-19	Kildare	Clonmel
16:00				Venue: Clonmel GAA Ground
	Gls: 1 Pts: 11		Gls: 3 Pts: 19	Referee: Jerome Henry (Mayo)

18 May 2025 Tailteann Cup	Leitrim	1-18 – 2-19	Sligo	Carrick-on-Shannon
13:30				Venue: Páirc Seán Mac Diarmada
	Gls: 1 Pts: 18		Gls: 2 Pts: 19	Referee: James Molloy (Galway)

==== Round 3 ====
31 May 2025 Tailteann Cup	Leitrim	3-09 – 0-10	Tipperary	Mullingar
				Venue: TEG Cusack Park
	Gls: 3 Pts: 09		Gls: 0 Pts: 10	Referee: T Murphy (Galway

1 June 2025 Tailteann Cup	Kildare	4-19 – 1-24	Sligo	Roscommon
				Venue: Dr. Hyde Park
	Gls: 4 Pts: 19		Gls: 1 Pts: 24	Referee: Paddy Neilan (Roscommon

=== Group 2 ===
Pos	Team	Pld	W	D	L	PF	PA	PD	Pts	Qualification
1	Wicklow	3	2	0	1	70	56	+14	4	Advance to quarter-final
2	Offaly	3	2	0	1	65	54	+11	4	Advance to preliminary quarter-final
3	Laois	3	2	0	1	71	65	+6	4	Advance to preliminary quarter-final
4	Waterford	3	0	0	3	56	87	−31	0	

Source: GAA

==== Round 1 ====
10 May 2025 Tailteann Cup	Laois	0-28 – 1-16	Waterford	Portlaoise
15:00		(HT: 0-19 - 1-7)		Venue: Laois Hire O'Moore Park
	Pts: Cathal Lee (one two-pointer, one free) 0-5, Mark Barry (one mark, one free) and Killian Roche (two frees, one two-point free) 0-4 each, Brian Byrne and Ronan Coffey (one free) 0-3 each, Niall Corbet and Michael Doran 0-2 each, Ben Dempsey, Damon Larkin, Kevin Swayne, Seamus Lacey and Shaun Fitzpatrick 0-1 each	Report	Gls: Ciaran Walsh; Pts: Jason Curry 0-10 (two frees, three two-point frees), Conor Murray 0-4 (one two-pointer). Michael O’Brien (both frees) 0-2	Referee: Derek O Mahoney (Tipperary)

10 May 2025 Tailteann Cup	Offaly	2-13 – 0-11	Wicklow	Tullamore
13:30		(HT: 1-6 - 0-8)		Venue: Glenisk O'Connor Park
	Gls: Diarmuid Egan, Jack Bryant. Pts: Jack Bryant 1-5 (1tp), Dylan Hyland 0-4 (0-1f), Diarmuid Egan 1-0, Shane Tierney 0-2, Cathal Flynn 0-1,	Report	Pts: Oisín McGraynor 0-2f, Mark Kenny 0-2, Kevin Quinn 0-2 (0-1f), Mark Jackson 0-2 (1tpf), Dean Healy 0-1, Cathal Baker 0-1, Cathal Fee 0-1	Referee: Niall Cullen (Fermanagh)

==== Round 2 ====
17 May 2025 Tailteann Cup	Waterford	1-13 – 1-18	Offaly	Waterford
13:30				Venue: Walsh Park
	Gls: 1 Pts: 13		Gls: 1 Pts: 18	Referee: Conor Lane

17 May 2025 Tailteann Cup	Wicklow	0-21 – 0-16	Laois	Aughrim, County Wicklow
18:00				Venue: Aughrim County Ground
	Gls: 0 Pts: 21		Gls: 0 Pts: 16	Referee: Fergal Kelly

==== Round 3 ====
31st May 2025 Tailteann Cup	Wicklow	3-29 (38) – 0-21	Waterford

31 May 2025 Tailteann Cup	Offaly	3-16 (25) – 3-18 (27)	Laois

=== Group 3 ===
Pos	Team	Pld	W	D	L	PF	PA	PD	Pts	Qualification
1	Limerick	3	3	0	0	65	49	+16	6	Advance to quarter-final
2	Westmeath	3	2	0	1	80	52	+28	4	Advance to preliminary quarter-final
3	Antrim	3	1	0	2	58	74	−16	2	Advance to preliminary quarter-final
4	London	3	0	0	3	48	76	−28	0	

Source: GAA

=== Group 4 ===
Pos	Team	Pld	W	D	L	PF	PA	PD	Pts	Qualification
1	Fermanagh	3	2	0	1	74	54	+20	4	Advance to quarter-final
2	Wexford	3	1	1	1	72	68	+4	3	Advance to preliminary quarter-final
3	Carlow	3	1	1	1	67	69	−2	3	Advance to preliminary quarter-final
4	Longford	3	1	0	2	51	73	−22	2	

Source: GAA

=== Ranking of third-placed teams ===
Pos	Grp	Team	Pld	W	D	L	PF	PA	PD	Pts	Qualification
1	2	Laois	3	2	0	1	71	60	+11	4	Advance to preliminary quarter-final
2	4	Carlow	3	1	1	1	67	69	−2	3	Advance to preliminary quarter-final
3	3	Antrim	3	1	0	2	58	74	−16	2	Advance to preliminary quarter-final
4	1	Leitrim	3	1	0	2	50	71	−21	2	

Source: GAA

== Knockout stage ==
=== Bracket ===
Preliminary Quarter-Finals
Westmeath	3-26
Laois	1-15
Wexford	5-23
Antrim	2-21
Sligo	1-27
Carlow	2-19
Offaly	2-25
New York	1-12

Quarter-Finals
Wicklow	2-18
Westmeath	2-17
Limerick	4-21
Wexford	2-19
Fermanagh	0-21
Sligo	1-16
Kildare	1-17
Offaly	0-19

Semi-Finals
Wicklow	1-17
Limerick	2-18
Fermanagh	0-9
Kildare	1-13

Final
Limerick	2-19
Kildare	1-24

=== Preliminary quarter-finals ===
7 June 2025 Preliminary quarter-final	Offaly	2-25 – 1-12	New York	Tullamore
14:00		Report		Stadium: O'Connor Park; Referee: David Murnane

7 June 2025 Preliminary quarter-final	Westmeath	3-26 – 1-15	Laois	Mullingar
17:00		Report		Stadium: TEG Cusack Park; Referee: Martin McNally (Monaghan)

8 June 2025 Preliminary quarter-final	Wexford	5-23 – 2-21	Antrim	Wexford
13:30		Report		Stadium: Wexford Park; Referee: Conor Lane (Cork)

8 June 2025 Preliminary quarter-final	Sligo	1-27 – 2-19	Carlow	Tubbercurry
14:00		Report		Stadium: Kilcoyne Park; Referee: B Cassidy (Derry)

=== Quarter-finals ===
14 June 2025 Quarter-final	Fermanagh	0-21 – 1-16	Sligo	Enniskillen
17:00		Report		Stadium: Brewster Park

14 June 2025 Quarter-final	Kildare	1-17 – 0-19	Offaly	Newbridge
18:30		Report		Stadium: St Conleth's Park; Attendance: 11,500; Referee: Thomas Murphy (Galway)

15 June 2025 Quarter-final	Wicklow	2-18 – 2-17	Westmeath	Aughrim
13:15		Report		Stadium: Echelon Park

15 June 2025 Quarter-final	Limerick	4-21 – 2-19	Wexford	Limerick
15:45				Stadium: TUS Gaelic Grounds

=== Semi-finals ===
22 June 2025 Semi-Final	Wicklow	1-17 - 2-18	Limerick	Dublin
14:00	D Healy 0-5 (2 tp); M Stone 1-0; M Jackson (2 frees), J Prendergast, E Darcy, K Quinn 0-2 each; C O'Brien, M Kenny, O McGraynor, J Kirwan 0-1 each.	Report	D Neville 1-2; J Ryan 0-4 (2 tpf); R Childs 1-0; P Nash 0-3 (3 frees); J Naughton, T McCarthy, B Coleman 0-2 each; E Rigter, C Fahy, D Murray 0-1 each.	Stadium: Croke Park; Attendance: 13,960; Referee: D Murnan (Cork)

22 June 2025 Semi-Final	Fermanagh	0-9 - 1-13	Kildare	Dublin
16:00	Conor Love 0-2, Darragh McGurn 0-1, Ryan Lyons 0-1, Joe McDade 0-1, Declan McCusker 0-1, Fionan O'Brien 0-1, Sean Cassidy 0-1, Josh Largo Ellis 0-1.	Report	Brian McLoughlin 0-5 (1 tp), James McGrath 1-0, Colm Dalton 0-2, Kevin Feely 0-2 (1 tp), Daniel Flynn 0-2, Alex Beirne 0-1, Darragh Kirwan 0-1.	Stadium: Croke Park; Attendance: 13,960; Referee: Kieran Eanetta (Tyrone)

=== Final ===
12 July 2025 Final	Kildare	1-24 – 2-19	Limerick	Dublin
14:30	Darragh Kirwan 0-8 (2 tp), Alex Beirne 1-2, Ryan Sinkey 0-3, Brian McLoughlin 0-3 (1 tp), Callum Bolton 0-2 (tp), Kevin Feely 0-2 (1f), Colm Dalton 0-2, Tommy Gill 0-1, Daniel Flynn 0-1.	Report	Cillian Fahy 1-1, Killian Ryan 1-1, Tony McCarthy 0-3, Josh Ryan 0-3 (1tpf, 1 45), Peter Nash 0-3 (1f), Emmet Rigter 0-2, James Naughton 0-2fs, Danny Neville 0-1, Tommie Childs 0-1, Iain Corbett 0-1, Rory O’Brien 0-1	Stadium: Croke Park; Referee: Liam Devenney

== Statistics ==
=== Scoring events ===
In Westmeath's game against Antrim, Luke Loughlin nearly broke Cillian O'Connor's record for the highest individual score in a championship match.

- Widest winning margin: 25 points
- Most goals in a match: 7 (Wexford v Antrim)
- Most points in a match: 47
- Most goals by one team in a match: 5 (Wexford)
- Most points by one team in a match: 36
- Highest aggregate score: 58 points (Wexford v Limerick)
- Lowest aggregate score: 22 points (Kildare v Fermanagh)

== Miscellaneous ==
- None of the four semi-finalists had ever reached the Tailteann Cup semi-finals before.

== See also ==
- 2025 All-Ireland Senior Football Championship (Tier 1)
- 2025 All-Ireland Junior Football Championship (Tier 3)
