= 2024 Tailteann Cup =

Gaelic football competition

Tournament details
- Level: Tier 2
- Year: 2024
- Trophy: Tailteann Cup
- Date: 11 May – 13 July 2024
- Teams: 17

Winners
- Champions: Down (1st win)
- Manager: Conor Laverty
- Captain: Pierce Laverty

Runners-up
- Runners-up: Laois
- Manager: Justin McNulty
- Captain: Charlie Donnelly

Other
- Matches played: 35

The 2024 Tailteann Cup was the third edition of the Tailteann Cup, a Gaelic football competition contested by the seventeen county teams that did not qualify for the last 16 of the 2024 All-Ireland Senior Football Championship. Kildare made their first appearance. The group draw took place on 30 April 2024.

The final was played on 13 July 2024 at Croke Park in Dublin, between Down and Laois. Down won after defeating Laois 0–14 to 2–06, and qualified for the group stage of the 2025 All-Ireland Senior Football Championship.

== Format ==
The 17 teams who competed in the 2024 All-Ireland Senior Football Championship but did not qualify for the round-robin group stages compete in the Tailteann Cup. Kildare enter the Tailteann Cup for the first time.

New York advance directly to the preliminary quarter-finals. The other 16 teams are drawn into four groups of four teams. Seeding is determined by placing in the 2024 National Football League (after promotion and relegation is applied and after division finals take place).

Each team in a group plays the other teams in their group once; each team gets one home fixture, one away and one neutral. Teams are awarded two points for a win and one point for a draw.

The four preliminary quarter-finals will consist of the second-placed teams receiving home advantage against New York and the three third-placed teams with the best record. At the quarter-final stage the four group winners play the four preliminary quarter-final winners.

The semi-finals and final are played in Croke Park. All knock-out matches are winner on the day. The winner of the 2024 Tailteann Cup qualify for the group stage of 2025 All-Ireland Senior Football Championship regardless of their league position.

=== Teams by province ===
Britain (1)

- London

Connacht (2)

- Leitrim
- Sligo

Leinster (7)

- Carlow
- Kildare (debut)
- Laois
- Longford
- Offaly
- Wexford
- Wicklow

Munster (3)

- Limerick
- Tipperary
- Waterford

Ulster (3)

- Antrim
- Down
- Fermanagh

North America (1)

- New York

== Teams ==
=== General information ===
Seventeen county teams compete in the Tailteann Cup:

County	Tailteann	Provincial	All-Ireland	Position in 2023	Appearance
Antrim	—	1951	—	Semi-final	3rd
Down	—	1994	1994	Finalists	3rd
Carlow	—	1944	—	Quarter-finals	3rd
Fermanagh	—	—	—	Preliminary quarter-finals	3rd
Kildare	—	2000	1928	—	1st
Laois	—	2003	—	Semi-finals	3rd
Leitrim	—	1994	—	Group stage	3rd
Limerick	—	1896	1896	Quarter-finals	2nd
London	—	—	—	Group stage	3rd
Longford	—	1968	—	Preliminary quarter-finals	3rd
Offaly	—	1997	1982	Preliminary quarter-finals	3rd
New York	—	—	—	Preliminary quarter-finals	3rd
Sligo	—	2007	—	—	2nd
Tipperary	—	2020	1920	Group stage	3rd
Waterford	—	1898	—	Group stage	3rd
Wexford	—	1945	1918	Quarter-finals	3rd
Wicklow	—	—	—	Group stage	3rd

=== Personnel and kits ===
County	Manager	Captain	Sponsors
Antrim	Andy McEntee	Dermot McAleese	Fibrus
Carlow	Niall Carew	Sean Gannon	SETU
Down	Conor Laverty	Pierce Laverty	EOS IT Solutions
Fermanagh	Kieran Donnelly	Declan McCusker	Tracey Concrete
Kildare	Glenn Ryan	Mick O'Grady	Brady Family
Laois	Justin McNulty	Trevor Collins and Evan O’Carroll	MW Hire Group
Leitrim	Andy Moran	Donal Wrynn	J. P. Clarke's Saloon, New York
Limerick	Jimmy Lee	Iain Corbett	JP McManus
London	Michael Maher	Liam Gavaghan	Clayton Hotel
Longford	Paddy Christie	Patrick Fox	Glennon Brothers
New York	Johnny McGeeney	Johnny Glynn	Navillus
Offaly	Declan Kelly	Declan Hogan	Glenisk
Sligo	Tony McEntee	Keelan Cawley	AbbVie
Tipperary	Paul Kelly	Conor Sweeney	Fiserv
Waterford	Ephie Fitzgerald	Dermot Ryan	Cognizant
Wexford	John Hegarty	Liam Coleman	Zurich Insurance Group
Wicklow	Oisín McConville	Padraig O’Toole	Joule

== Draws ==
=== Group stage seeding ===
Numbers in brackets indicate ranking in the 2024 NFL.

Pot 1

- Down (16)
- Fermanagh (17)
- Kildare (18)
- Sligo (20)

Pot 2

- Antrim (21)
- Offaly (22)
- Laois (23)
- Leitrim (24)

Pot 3

- Wicklow (25)
- Limerick (26)
- Wexford (27)
- Longford (28)

Pot 4

- Carlow (29)
- Tipperary (30)
- Waterford (31)
- London (32)

New York (33) enter the Tailteann Cup at the preliminary quarter-final stage.

=== Knockout stage seeding ===
The preliminary quarter-final draw took place on 2 June 2024.

Seeded into quarter-finals

- Kildare
- Sligo
- Fermanagh
- Down

Seeded into preliminary quarter-finals

- Leitrim
- Antrim
- Laois
- Limerick

Unseeded in preliminary quarter-finals

- London (3rd Group 4)
- Wicklow (3rd Group 3)
- Tipperary (3rd Group 2)
- New York (automatically placed in preliminary quarter-finals)

== Group stage ==
=== Group 1 ===
Pos	Team	Pld	W	D	L	PF	PA	PD	Pts	Qualification
1	Kildare	3	3	0	0	83	32	+51	6	Advance to quarter-final
2	Leitrim	3	2	0	1	47	48	−1	4	Advance to preliminary quarter-final
3	Waterford	3	1	0	2	42	66	−24	2	
4	Longford	3	0	0	3	50	76	−26	0	

Source: GAA

=== Group 2 ===
Pos	Team	Pld	W	D	L	PF	PA	PD	Pts	Qualification
1	Sligo	3	2	1	0	78	56	+22	5	Advance to quarter-final
2	Antrim	3	2	1	0	62	56	+6	5	Advance to preliminary quarter-final
3	Tipperary	3	1	0	2	48	67	−19	2	Advance to preliminary quarter-final
4	Wexford	3	0	0	3	50	59	−9	0	

Source: GAA

=== Group 3 ===
Pos	Team	Pld	W	D	L	PF	PA	PD	Pts	Qualification
1	Fermanagh	3	3	0	0	61	41	+20	6	Advance to quarter-final
2	Laois	3	1	1	1	53	53	0	3	Advance to preliminary quarter-final
3	Wicklow	3	1	0	2	34	48	−14	2	Advance to preliminary quarter-final
4	Carlow	3	0	1	2	48	54	−6	1	

Source: GAA

=== Group 4 ===
Pos	Team	Pld	W	D	L	PF	PA	PD	Pts	Qualification
1	Down	3	3	0	0	78	41	+37	6	Advance to quarter-final
2	Limerick	3	2	0	1	45	41	+4	4	Advance to preliminary quarter-final
3	London	3	1	0	2	46	59	−13	2	Advance to preliminary quarter-final
4	Offaly	3	0	0	3	42	70	−28	0	

Source: GAA

=== Ranking of third-placed teams ===
Pos	Grp	Team	Pld	W	D	L	PF	PA	PD	Pts	Qualification
1	4	London	3	1	0	2	46	59	−13	2	Advance to preliminary quarter-final
2	3	Wicklow	3	1	0	2	34	48	−14	2	Advance to preliminary quarter-final
3	2	Tipperary	3	1	0	2	48	67	−19	2	Advance to preliminary quarter-final
4	1	Waterford	3	1	0	2	42	66	−24	2	

Source: GAA

== Knockout stage ==
Preliminary quarter-finals
Leitrim	1-11
Wicklow	2-15
Limerick	1-18
Tipperary	1-10
Laois	1-13
New York	1-9
Antrim	3-11
London	1-10

Quarter-finals
Down	1-18
Wicklow	0-12
Sligo	2-20
Limerick	0-9
Kildare	0-12
Laois	2-11
Fermanagh	0-11
Antrim	1-11

Semi-finals
Down (a.e.t.)	1-20
Sligo	2-15
Laois	3-12
Antrim	1-13

Final
Down	0-14
Laois	2-06

=== Preliminary quarter-finals ===
8 June 2024 Preliminary quarter-final	Limerick	1-18 - 1-10	Tipperary	Rathkeale
16:00	Rigter 1-3 (1m), Neville 0-4, Ryan 0-3 (2'45,1f), Nash 0-2f, Naughton 0-2, Childs 0-1, Corbett 0-1, Fahy 0-1, McCarthy 0-1	Report	Feehan 1-1, O'Connor 0-5 (3f), McGarry 0-2, Doyle 0-1, Quirke 0-1	Stadium: Mick Neville Park; Referee: Seamus Mulhare (Laois)

8 June 2024 Preliminary quarter-final	Leitrim	1-11 - 2-15	Wicklow	Longford
19:00	McNulty 1-2 (1f), Rooney 0-4f, O'Donnell 0-2 (1'45), O'Rourke 0-2, Plunkett 0-1	Report	Nolan 1-2, Healy 0-4, O'Brien 1-1, Quinn 0-3 (1f), Jackson 0-2f, McGraynor 0-1f, Murphy 0-1, O'Toole 0-1	Stadium: Pearse Park; Referee: Kieran Eannetta (Tyrone)

9 June 2024 Preliminary quarter-final	Laois	1-13 - 1-09	New York	Portlaoise
12:30	Barry 0-3, Kingston 0-3f, Roche 0-3f, Timmons 1-0, O'Carroll 0-2, Dunne 0-1, Murphy 0-1	Report	Butler 0-5f, O'Regan 1-1, Brosnan 0-1, Grace 0-1f, Reilly 0-1	Stadium: O'Moore Park; Referee: David Murnane (Cork)

9 June 2024 Preliminary quarter-final	Antrim	3-11 - 2-10	London	Belfast
14:00	McCann 2-0, McAleese 1-0, McEnhill 0-2 (1f), McQuillan 0-2 (1f), Burns 0-1, Finnegan 0-1, Hand 0-1, Jordan 0-1, McAleer 0-1m, McBride 0-1, Walsh 0-1	Report	Carroll 1-1, Diver 0-4 (2f), Dornan 1-0, Barry 0-1, Clarke 0-1, Kerr 0-1, Obahor 0-1, O'Flaherty 0-1	Stadium: Corrigan Park; Referee: Conor Dourneen (Cavan)

=== Quarter-finals ===
15 June 2024 Quarter-final	Down	1-18 - 0-12	Wicklow	Newry
16:30	Havern 0-6 (1m, 2f), Johnston 0-4, McGovern 1-0, Kerr 0-2, McGuinness 0-2, Doherty 0-1, Magill 0-1, McEvoy 0-1 (1'45), Savage 0-1f	Report	Quinn 0-4f, Jackson 0-3 (2'45,1f), O'Brien 0-2, McGreynor 0-1, O'Keane 0-1, O'Toole 0-1	Stadium: Páirc Esler; Referee: Fergal Kelly (Longford)

15 June 2024 Quarter-final	Sligo	2-20 - 0-09	Limerick	Sligo
17:00	Carrabine 0-7 (3f, 1m), Deignan 1-1, Lally 0-3, Murphy 0-3 (1f, 1'45), O'Connor 1-0, Cummins 0-2, McLaughlin 0-2, Mullen 0-1, Mulligan 0-1	Report	Nash 0-2f, Ryan 0-2 (1f, 1'45), R Childs 0-1, T Childs 0-1, Corbett 0-1, Fahy 0-1, O'Dea 0-1	Stadium: Markievicz Park; Attendance: 2,238; Referee: Barry Cassidy (Derry)

15 June 2024 Quarter-final	Fermanagh	0-11 - 1-11	Antrim	Enniskillen
18:00	Cassidy 0-3 (2f), Kelm 0-2, C Jones 0-1f, G Jones 0-1, McCaffrey 0-1, McCusker 0-1, McDade 0-1, O'Brien 0-1	Report	Byrne 0-3 (1'45), C Hynds 1-0, Healy 0-2, E Hynds 0-2, Hand 0-1, McBride 0-1, McEnhill 0-1, McQuillan 0-1	Stadium: Brewster Park; Referee: Brendan Griffin (Kerry)

16 June 2024 Quarter-final	Kildare	0-12 - 2-11	Laois	Tullamore
13:15	Farrell 0-6 (3f, 1'45), Kirwan 0-3, Beirne 0-1, Feely 0-1, Kelly 0-1	Report	Barry 1-2 (1-0p, 1f), O'Carroll 1-1, Roche 0-4 (3f, 1'45), Dunne 0-1, Heffernan 0-1, Kingston 0-1, Lowry 0-1	Stadium: O'Connor Park; Referee: Thomas Murphy (Galway)

=== Semi-finals ===
23 June 2024 Semi-final	Antrim	1-13 - 3-12	Laois	Dublin
14:00	McBride 0-5, McAleer 1-0, McEnhill 0-3 (1f, 1m), McLarnon 0-2, Byrne 0-1 (1'45), Hand 0-1, McCann 0-1	Report	Byrne 2-0, Barry 0-4 (1f), Swayne 1-0, Dunne 0-2 (1m), Kelly 0-2, O'Carroll 0-2, Kingston 0-1, Roche 0-1	Stadium: Croke Park; Attendance: 10,348; Referee: Liam Devenney (Mayo)

23 June 2024 Semi-final	Down	1-20 - 2-15 (a.e.t.)	Sligo	Dublin
16:00	Havern 0-7 (0-4f), Kerr 0-3, Murdock 1-00p, Laverty 0-2, McEvoy 0-2, Guinness 0-1, Johnston 0-1, Magill 0-1, McGovern 0-1, Mooney 0-1, Rooney 0-1	Report	Carrabine 0-4 (2f), O'Connor 1-1, Mulligan 1-0, Murphy 0-3 (2f), Cummins 0-2, Deignan 0-2, McGuinness 0-1, Mullen 0-1, Walsh 0-1	Stadium: Croke Park; Attendance: 10,348; Referee: Derek O'Mahoney (Tipperary)

=== Final ===
Down (in red jerseys) take on Laois during the final.

13 July 2024 Final	Down	0-14 - 2-06	Laois	Dublin
15:00	O Murdock, P Havern (1f) 0-3 each; D Magill 0-2; S Johnston, R Johnston, J Flynn, L Kerr, C Mooney, J Kelly 0-1 each	Report	M Barry 1-2 (0-1f); S Lacey 1-0; E O’Carroll, K Roche (f), P Kingston (f), C Heffernan 0-1 each	Stadium: Croke Park; Referee: Brendan Griffin (Kerry)

== Stadia and locations ==
County	Location	Province	Stadium	Capacity
Antrim	Belfast	Ulster	Corrigan Park	3,700
Carlow	Carlow	Leinster	Dr Cullen Park	21,000
Down	Newry	Ulster	Páirc Esler	20,000
Fermanagh	Enniskillen	Ulster	Brewster Park	20,000
Kildare (Note: Kildare's usual home venue, St. Conleth's Park in Newbridge, was under redevelopment.)	Newbridge	Leinster	Manguard Park	1,200
Kildare	Tullamore	Leinster	O'Connor Park	20,000
Laois	Portlaoise	Leinster	O'Moore Park	27,000
Leitrim	Carrick-on-Shannon	Connacht	Páirc Seán Mac Diarmada	9,331
Limerick	Limerick	Munster	Gaelic Grounds	44,023
Limerick	Rathkeale	Munster	Mick Neville Park	2,000
London	South Ruislip	Britain	McGovern Park	3,000
Longford	Longford	Leinster	Pearse Park	10,000
New York	Bronx	North America	Gaelic Park	2,000
Offaly	Tullamore	Leinster	O'Connor Park	20,000
Sligo	Sligo	Connacht	Markievicz Park	18,558
Tipperary	Thurles	Munster	Semple Stadium	45,690
Waterford	Waterford	Munster	Fraher Field	15,000
Wexford	Wexford	Leinster	Chadwicks Wexford Park	20,000
Wicklow	Aughrim	Leinster	Aughrim County Ground	7,000

== Championship statistics ==
=== Scoring events ===
As of 24 June (after semi-finals).

- Widest winning margin: 24 points
  - Waterford 0-06 - 5-15 Kildare (Round 2)
- Most goals in a match: 6
  - Antrim 4-12 - 2-13 Tipperary (Round 1)
- Most points in a match: 40
  - Sligo 0-20 - 0-20 Antrim (Round 3)
- Most goals by one team in a match: 5
  - Waterford 0-06 - 5-15 Kildare (Round 2)
- Most points by one team in a match: 25
  - Kildare 3-25 - 1-11 Longford (Round 1)
- Highest aggregate score: 50 points
  - Down 2-22 - 3-13 Offaly (Round 3)
- Lowest aggregate score: 21 points
  - Laois 0-11 - 0-10 Wicklow (Round 2)

== Miscellaneous ==
- Kildare make their debut in the Tailteann Cup.
- London win their first ever Tailteann Cup match after defeating Offaly.
- London and Tipperary progress past the first round of the Tailteann Cup for the first time, after being knocked out at the initial stage in both 2022 and 2023.

== See also ==
- 2024 All-Ireland Senior Football Championship (Tier 1)
- 2024 All-Ireland Junior Football Championship (Tier 3)
