= Sligo Senior Football League (Division 2) =

Sligo Senior Football League Division 2
- Founded: 2004
- Title holders: Castleconnor (3rd title)
- Most titles: Coolera/Strandhill Castleconnor (3 titles)
- Sponsors: Expert Electrical

The Sligo Senior Football League Division 2 is an annual Gaelic Athletic Association club league competition between the Sligo clubs operating in the Senior League, though not in the top division. This split has been in place since 2004, when the Division was known as Division 1B. The finalists are both promoted to Division 1 for the following year. Geevagh won the title in 2008, defeating Castleconnor in the final.

== Top winners ==
#	Club	Wins	Years won	Last final lost
1	Coolera/Strandhill	3	2005, 2007, 2012	n/a
1	Castleconnor	3	1998, 2004, 2018	2008
2	Tubbercurry	2	2013, 2025	2005
2	St Farnan's	2	2011, 2021	n/a
3	Bunninadden	1	2006	2022
3	Curry	1	2022	
3	Enniscrone/Kilglass	1	2024	
3	Eastern Harps	1	2023	
3	Geevagh	1	2008	2026
3	Calry St. Joseph's	1	2019	
3	St John's	1	2009	n/a
3	St Mary's	1	2010	n/a
3	Owenmore Gaels	1	2026	

== Roll of honour ==
From 2010 there were no league finals played. The team who finished top of the table was deemed the winner. Since 2015 a league final has been played.

Year	Winner	Score	Opponent	Score
2026	Owenmore Gaels	1-18	Geevagh	1-17
2025	Tubbercurry	5-8	Ballymote	0-15
2024	Enniscrone/Kilglass	2-11		
2023	Eastern Harps		Coolaney-Mullinabreena	
2022	Curry	2-17	Bunninadden	3-13
2021	St Farnan's			
2020	Competition not played (Covid19)			
2019	Calry St. Joseph's		Geevagh	
2018	Castleconnor		Calry/St. Joseph's	
2013	Tubbercurry		Drumcliffe–Rosses Point	
2012	Coolera/Strandhill		n/a	
2011	St Farnan's		n/a	
2010	St Mary's		n/a	
2009	St John's	2-12	Bunninadden	0-09
2008	Geevagh	2-15	Castleconnor	0-11
2007	Coolera/Strandhill	2-13	Tubbercurry	1-09
2006	Bunninadden	3-09	Easkey	0-07
2005	Coolera	0-09	Tubbercurry	0-07
2004	Castleconnor	1-09	Ballymote	0-08
1998	Castleconnor			
