= 2024 Tailteann Cup final =

Final match of the 2024 Tailteann Cup

- Event: 2024 Tailteann Cup
| Down | Laois |
| 0–14 (14) | 2–6 (12) |
- Date: 13 July 2024
- Venue: Croke Park, Dublin
- Man of the Match: Odhran Murdock
- Referee: Brendan Griffin (Kerry)

The 2024 Tailteann Cup final was the third final of the Tailteann Cup and the culmination of the 2024 Tailteann Cup, the GAA's second-tier Gaelic football competition for county teams. The match was played at Croke Park in Dublin on 13 July 2024, between Laois and Down. The game was played prior to the All Ireland football semi-final between Kerry and Armagh. It was televised live on RTÉ2 as part of The Saturday Game, presented by Joanne Cantwell from the Croke Park studio.

Down won the match on a scoreline of 0–14 to 2–6.

== Paths to the final ==
Down
| Round | Date | Opponent | Venue (H/A/N) | Result | Victory margin | Score | Ref |
|---|---|---|---|---|---|---|---|
| Group game | 11 May 2024 | Limerick | Páirc Esler (H) | Win | 14 | 1-20 to 1-6 | |
| Group game | 18 May 2024 | London | McGovern Park (A) | Win | 17 | 1-24 to 0-10 | |
| Group game | 2 June 2024 | Offaly | Breffni Park (N) | Win | 6 | 2-22 to 3-13 | |
| Quarter-final | 15 June 2024 | Wicklow | Páirc Esler (H) | Win | 9 | 1-18 to 0-12 | |
| Semi-final | 23 June 2024 | Sligo | Croke Park (N) | Win | 2 | 1-20 to 2–15 a.e.t. | |

Laois
| Round | Date | Opponent | Venue (H/A/N) | Result | Victory margin | Score | Ref |
|---|---|---|---|---|---|---|---|
| Group game | 12 May 2024 | Carlow | O'Moore Park (H) | Draw | 0 | 2-17 to 2-17 | |
| Group game | 19 May 2024 | Wicklow | Echelon Park (A) | Win | 1 | 0-11 to 0-10 | |
| Group game | 1 June 2024 | Fermanagh | Pearse Park, Longford (N) | Loss | –1 | 2-13 to 3-11 | |
| Preliminary quarter-final | 9 June 2024 | New York | O'Moore Park (H) | Win | 4 | 1-13 to 1-9 | |
| Quarter-final | 16 June 2024 | Kildare | O'Connor Park (A) | Win | 5 | 2-11 to 0-12 | |
| Semi-final | 23 June 2024 | Antrim | Croke Park (N) | Win | 5 | 3-12 to 1-13 | |

== Match ==
Down (in red jerseys) take on Laois during the final

=== Details ===
Laois came strongly into the game after a tricky start, reeling off 1–2 between the seventh and 15th minutes. Seamus Lacey grabbed an 11th minute goal that put the Division 4 champions ahead briefly, 1–1 to 0–3. Meanwhile, Down had possession and while they fired four of the game's next five points to lead 0–8 to 1–3 at half-time, six wides in the first-half undermined them. The sides shared six points equally in the third quarter, Laois initially scoring three-in-a-row to take the lead before Down responded. Down stretched the gap to five after reeling off six points in a row in all between the 46th and 69th minutes. Laois dramatically grabbed a goal back through Barry in stoppage time to make it an interesting final few minutes.

13 July 2024
15:00

| Down | 0–14 (14) – (12) 2–06 | Laois |
|---|---|---|
| O Murdock, P Havern (1f) 0-3 each; D Magill 0-2; S Johnston, R Johnston, J Flynn, L Kerr, C Mooney, J Kelly 0-1 each | Report | M Barry 1-2 (0-1f); S Lacey 1-0; E O’Carroll, K Roche (f), P Kingston (f), C Heffernan 0-1 each |

Croke Park, Dublin
Referee: Brendan Griffin (Kerry)
