= Ruairí McCann =

Antrim Gaelic footballer

Ruairí McCann is a Gaelic footballer who plays for the Antrim county team. He is a chartered physiotherapist. He is a playmaker and full-forward.
