= Aidan Devaney =

Sligo Gaelic football goalkeeper

Sport
- Sport: Gaelic football
- Position: Goalkeeper
Club
- Years: Club
- Calry-St Joseph's
Inter-county
- Years: County
- Sligo

Aidan Devaney is a Gaelic footballer who plays as a goalkeeper for Calry-St Joseph's and at senior level for the Sligo county team.

Devaney helped Sligo past Leitrim and into Croke Park in the 2022 Tailteann Cup. He made two saves against London at Markievicz Park in an earlier game (one of which was a penalty) when extra time was needed for Sligo to advance.

In October, Devaney was named on Tailteann Cup Team of the Year.

== Honours ==
Individual

- Tailteann Cup Team of the Year (1): 2022
