= Odhran Murdock =

Down Gaelic footballer

Odhran Murdock is a Gaelic footballer who plays for Burren and the Down county team. His performances for Burren and Down led to interest from the Australian Football League, which invited him for trials.

Murdock won an Ulster Under-20 Football Championship title in 2023. This was after Down senior manager Conor Laverty expressed interest in using him for a 2023 Ulster Senior Football Championship game if he was not playing for the county's under-20 team.

Eventually joining up again with the Down senior team, Murdock scored a penalty in the 84th minute of the 2024 Tailteann Cup semi-final to send Down through to the final.
