= Niall Murphy =

Irish Gaelic footballer

Niall Murphy is a Gaelic footballer who plays for the Coolera/Strandhill club and the Sligo county team.

On 25 October 2017, Murphy was named in the Ireland squad for the 2017 International Rules Series against Australia in November.

He became Sligo captain in 2019. However, he spent much of 2020 injured so Keelan Cawley succeeded him in 2021.
