= Barnes Murphy =

Irish Gaelic footballer

Personal information
- Born: Sligo, County Sligo

Sport
- Sport: Gaelic football
- Position: Centre half back / Midfield
Club
- Years: Club
- 1967–85: St Mary's All-Ireland 7 a-side (1980)
Club titles
- Sligo titles: 8
- Connacht titles: 3
	Football	Hurling
All-Ireland titles	1	
Inter-county
- Years: County
- 1967 - 1981: Sligo
Inter-county titles
- Connacht titles: 1
- All Stars: 1

Barnes Murphy (born in Sligo, Ireland), is a former Gaelic footballer who represented the Sligo county team during the 1970s and 1980s. Aside from winning a GAA All Stars Award in 1974, he won a Connacht Senior Football Championship medal with Sligo in 1975 when he both captained and coached Sligo the same year. Murphy played football for Connacht many times in his career, and he represented Connacht in the 1976 Railway Cup when he was selected as the first and only Sligo man to captain his province.

Murphy also had successes at club level, winning five county championships (with Craomh Rua and St Mary's), five League medals (also with Craomh Rua and St Mary's), three Connacht club championships and, an All-Ireland 7s. He also won Junior titles with St John's after the new club was formed when the old Sligo borough boundaries were further divided.

As of 2012, Murphy was living in his native Sligo where he was still involved in club football. Barnes is featured in The Best of the West: GAA Greats of Connacht, a book by John Scally that features a number of GAA players from the west of Ireland.
