= Danny Magill =

Down Gaelic footballer

Danny Magill is a Gaelic footballer who plays for the Down county team.

He made his debut in 2023. A second-half substitute in the 2024 Tailteann Cup final, Magill was described in many reports as an important player in Down's victory. He also scored a late goal in the 2023 Tailteann Cup quarter-final victory over Cavan, as well as a goal against Longford in the same competition.

Magill is the son of Miceal, who also played for Down, and was part of the 1994 All-Ireland Senior Football Championship final-winning team.
