= Pierce Laverty =

Down Gaelic footballer

Pierce Laverty is a Gaelic footballer who plays for Saul, as well as the Down county team.

He captained Down to the 2024 Tailteann Cup title. He also captained Down to the 2023 Tailteann Cup final.
