= Liam Kerr (Gaelic footballer) =

Down Gaelic footballer

Liam Kerr is a Gaelic footballer who plays for Burren, as well as the Down county team.

He scored three goals and two points against Laois in the 2023 Tailteann Cup semi-final.
