= Conor Laverty =

Gaelic footballer

Personal information
- Born: County Down, Northern Ireland
- Height: 1.78 m (5 ft 10 in)

Sport
- Sport: Gaelic football
- Position: Left Corner Forward
Club
- Years: Club
- 2004–2021: Kilcoo
Club titles
- Down titles: 10
- Ulster titles: 2
- All-Ireland Titles: 1
Inter-county
- Years: County
- 2005–2018: Down

Conor Laverty is a Gaelic football manager and player. He plays for Kilcoo and, formerly, the Down county football team. He has been manager of the Down county football team since 2022 and, under his leadership, Down won the Tailteann Cup in 2024.

== Career ==
Laverty played at senior level for the Down county team. He played as a forward. Announcing Laverty's reign as Down manager, the county board stated that he had played for Down at all levels, was involved in the 2010 All-Ireland Senior Football Championship Final and the 2012 Ulster Senior Football Championship final, received an All Star nomination in 2012, captained his county in 2015, had by that stage won ten county championships with his club Kilcoo and was joint captain when Kilcoo won Ulster titles in 2019 and 2020 and the All-Ireland title in 2022. He was also captain when Kilcoo won the 2021–22 All-Ireland Senior Club Football Championship.

Laverty showed early promise as a coach, at the age of 16 he was training the Kilcoo U16s: he was involved with the St Michael's, Enniskillen team that won both the 2019 MacRory Cup and Hogan Cup. After being a selector or a coach under Monaghan boss Séamus McEnaney in 2020, Laverty was involved in Down's Ulster Under-20 Football Championship win in 2021.

Laverty, after winning about 10 Down Senior Football Championship titles with Kilcoo, was set to be appointed as Down boss in 2021 but was not appointed on that occasion.

=== 2024 ===
Laverty has always demonstrated ambition for the county team. Speaking after the 2024 Tailteann Cup final he said ""We want to be playing Sam Maguire football, we want to be bringing some of the best teams in Ireland to Newry....That's what we started out and what we said. We want to compete with the best teams in Ireland."

=== 2025 ===
In 2025 Laverty's Down team progressed to All-Ireland SFC preliminary quarter-final and lost by 3-21 to Galway's 2-26.

== Personal life ==
Laverty is GAA development officer for Trinity College. He combines this professional role with his managerial responsibilities with Down and is also the father of six boys.
