= 2024 Nicky Rackard Cup =

Hurling competition

- Dates: 13 April - 2 June 2024
- Teams: 6
- Champions: Donegal (4th title); Conor Gartland (captain); Mickey McCann (manager)
- Runners-up: Mayo; David Kenny (captain); Brian Finn (manager)
- Promoted: Donegal
- Relegated: Monaghan

Tournament statistics
- Matches played: 16
- Goals scored: 49 (3.06 per match)
- Points scored: 584 (36.5 per match)
- Top scorer(s): Alex O'Boyle (2-45)

The 2024 Nicky Rackard Cup was the twentieth edition of the Nicky Rackard Cup since its establishment by the Gaelic Athletic Association in 2005 and is the fourth-tier of Hurling for senior county teams (the All-Ireland Senior Hurling Championship is the first-tier trophy). It is contested by six GAA county teams ranked 24–29 in the 2024 All-Ireland Senior Hurling Championship. The competition ran from 13 April to 2 June 2024.

The Nicky Rackard Cup final was played on 2 June 2024 at Croke Park in Dublin, between Donegal and Mayo, in what was their second meeting in the final overall and a first meeting in four years. Donegal won the match by 3–17 to 0–22 to claim their fourth cup title overall and a first title in four years.

Armagh's Alex O'Boyle was the top scorer with 2-45.

== Team changes ==
=== To Championship ===
Relegated from the Christy Ring Cup

- Mayo

Promoted from the Lory Meagher Cup

- Monaghan

=== From Championship ===
Promoted to the Christy Ring Cup

- Wicklow

Relegated to the Lory Meagher Cup

- Fermanagh

== Teams ==
=== General Information ===
County	Last Cup Title	Last Provincial Title	Last All-Ireland Title	Position in 2023 Championship	Appearance
Armagh	2012	—	—	3rd	15th
Donegal	2020	1932	—	Runners-up	16th
Louth	—	—	—	5th	16th
Mayo	2021	1909	—	6th (Christy Ring Cup)	5th
Monaghan	—	1915	—	Champions (Lory Meagher Cup)	17th
Roscommon	2015	1913	—	4th	11th

=== Personnel and kits ===
County	Manager	Captain(s)	Sponsor
Armagh			
Donegal			
Louth			
Mayo			
Monaghan			
Roscommon			

== Group stage ==
=== Table ===
Pos	Team	Pld	W	D	L	SF	SA	Diff	Pts	Qualification
1	Donegal	5	5	0	0	9-114	4-71	58	10	Advance to Final
2	Mayo	5	3	1	1	13-105	4-81	51	7	Advance to Final
3	Roscommon	5	3	1	1	8-87	5-91	5	7	
5	Armagh	5	2	0	3	5-85	4-107	-19	4	
4	Louth	5	1	0	4	6-80	10-96	-28	2	
6	Monaghan	5	0	0	5	5-74	19-99	-67	0	Relegated to Lory Meagher Cup

=== Round 1 ===
13 April 2024 Round 1	Armagh	1-12 - 0-22	Donegal	BOX-IT Athletic Grounds
	A O’Boyle 1-6,4f; P Gaffney 0-2; A Fox 0-2; C Duffy 0-1; J O’Connor 0-1.	Report	G Gilmore 0-7,4f; L McKinney 0-6; R Campbell and C Gartland 0-3; D Coulter 0-1; P Kelly 0-1; S Ward 0-1.

13 April 2024 Round 1	Roscommon	1-20 - 1-14	Louth	Dr Hyde Park
	P Fallon (0-9, 8F), B Mulry (1-4), J Hardiman (0-2), C Murray (0-2), C Cosgrove (0-1), J Dowling (0-1), D Finn (0-1).	Report	D Geoghegan (0-6,4F), P Lynch (0-4, 3F), C Murphy (1-0), S Kettle (0-1), S Connelly (0-1), T McCreesh (0-1), R McKeown (0-1).

14 April 2024 Round 1	Mayo	4-24 - 2-08	Monaghan	Hastings MacHale Park
	S Regan 2-2; S Boland 0-7 (4f); J Heraty 1-1; A Phillips, L Lavin and C Phillips (3f) 0-4 each; J Doocey 1-0; E Delaney, E Collins 0-1 each.	Report	N Garland 1-1; N Arthur 0-4 (2f); B Douglas 1-0 (own goal); E Walsh, T Hughes, C Gernon 0-1 each.

=== Round 2 ===
20 April 2024 Round 2	Monaghan	1-16 - 4-17	Roscommon	Grattan Park
	N Arthur 0-14, O Kiernan 1-0, D Hughes 0-1, M Murphy 0-1.	Report	C Murray 3-2, P Fallon 0-6, C Mulry 1-1, L Óg Coyle 0-3, B Mulry 0-2, J Dowling 0-1, S Canning 0-1, D Mullen 0-1.

20 April 2024 Round 2	Donegal	0-21 - 0-14	Mayo	O'Donnell Park
	G Gilmore (0-8, 3f), L McKinney (0-3), L White (0-2f); R Campbell (0-2), C Gartland (0-2); D Coulter (0-1f); P Kelly (0-1), O Grant (0-1), S Ward (0-1).	Report	B Douglas (0-4, 3f 1 45'); L Lavin (0-3, 1f); S Boland (0-2, 1f), C Phillips (0-2f), E Delaney (0-1), L Connor (0-1), O Greally (0-1).

21 April 2024 Round 2	Louth	0-17 - 0-18	Armagh	Páirc Naomh Bríd
	D Geoghegan 0-13 (8f, 1 65), R McKeown 0-1; R Mulholland 0-1; C Murphy 0-1, P Lynch 0-1.	Report	Alex O’Boyle 0-10 (8f); Ciarán Duffy 0-2, Aaron Fox 0-2; Paul Gaffney 0-1, Liam O’Flaherty 0-1, Stephen Renaghan 0-1, F Donnelly 0-1.

=== Round 3 ===
27 April 2024 Round 3	Donegal	4-27 - 0-15	Monaghan	O'Donnell Park
	G Gilmore 1-10, 8f; D Couler 1-3; L McKinney 1-3; J McGee Cronolly 0-4; O Grant 1-0; R Campbell and S McVeigh 0-2 each; B McIntyre, C O’Grady, and G Browne 0-1 each.	Report	N Arthur 0-9, 8f; L Moloney 0-3; T Hughes 0-2f; D Hughes 0-1.

27 April 2024 Round 3	Louth	0-17 - 3-22	Mayo	Páirc Naomh Bríd
	D Geogheghan (0-5, 4f), D Carey (0-3, 2f), J Casey (0-2), P Lynch (0-2, 1f); S Kettle (0-2); P Fortune (0-1), A McGuinness (0-1); R McKeown (0-1).	Report	C Phillips (2-5, 0-4f, 0-1 65), S Boland (0-5, 2f), E Delaney (1-1), B Douglas (0-3, 3f); K Feeney (0-2), S Regan (0-2), E Collins (0-2); O Greally (0-1), D Kenny (0-1).

28 April 2024 Round 3	Armagh	0-20 - 0-21	Roscommon	BOX-IT Athletic Grounds
	A O’Boyle 0-13 (10f, 2’65), T Galvin 0-3, J O’Connor, F Donnelly, B Shortt, C Renaghan 0-1 each.	Report	C Murray 0-6, C Cosgrove 0-4 (2f), C Mulry, P Fallon (2f, 1sl) 0-3 each, J Hardiman 0-2, B Lawlor, B Mulry, J Martin 0-1 each.

=== Round 4 ===
11 May 2024 Round 4	Monaghan	2-17 - 4-12	Louth	Grattan Park
	N Arthur (0-8, 2 frees), L Moloney (1-1 frees), K Crawley (1-0), N Garland (0-3), H Byrne (0-2, frees); D Hughes (0-1); P Malone (0-1), T Hughes (0-1).	Report	D Geoghegan (1-7, 1-6 frees), C Murphy (2-1), A McGuinness Smith (1-1), P Lynch (0-1), P Fortune (0-1); S Hodgins (0-1).

11 May 2024 Round 4	Mayo	4-29 - 1-16	Armagh	Hastings MacHale Park
	C Phillips 1-5 (3f); S Boland 1-3 (2f); L Lavin 0-6; S Regan 1-2; J Heraty 1-0; B Douglas (2f), S Kenny and D Huane 0-2 each; A Phillips, E Delaney, C Hession, E Collins, K Gallagher, K Feeney and B Sheridan 0-1 each.	Report	A O’Boyle (7f) 0-9; C Duffy 1-1; C Reneghan 0-2; F Donnelly, T Galvin, P McBride and K Laverty 0-1 each.

11 May 2024 Round 4	Roscommon	2-10 - 1-25	Donegal	Dr Hyde Park
	P Fallon 0-4, 2 '65’; B Mulry 1-1; R Fallon 1-0; C Murray, S Canning, J Hardiman, C Cosgrove, C Mulry 0-1 each.	Report	G Gilmore 0-10, 9f, 1 '65’; L McKinney 0-7; S Ward 1-3; P Kelly 0-3; S Gillespie and D O Maoileididhgh 0-1 each.

=== Round 5 ===
18 May 2024 Round 5	Louth	1-20 - 4-19	Donegal	Páirc Naomh Bríd
	D Geoghegan (0-13, 12 frees), A McGuinness-Smith (1-1), C Murphy (0-2), P Lynch (0-1); J Costello (0-1), J Casey (0-1); S Phelan (0-1).	Report	R Campbell (2-2), R McDermott (1-2), D O Maoileidigh (0-5, 4 frees), P Kelly (1-1); S Gillespie (0-1), L White (0-1 free); C Finn (0-1), R Hilferty (0-1), J Monagle (0-1); D Harvey (0-1), D Cullen (0-1), L McKinney (0-1), B McIntyre (0-1).

18 May 2024 Round 5	Armagh	3-19 - 0-18	Monaghan	BOX-IT Athletic Grounds
	T Galvin 2-7, A O’Boyle 1-7 (7f), P Gaffney 0-2, C Duffy 0-1, S Renaghan 0-1, D Ryan 0-1.	Report	N Arthur 0-12, D Hughes 0-2, M Murphy 0-1, O Kiernan 0-1, N Garland 0-1, T Hughes 0-1.

18 May 2024 Round 5	Roscommon	1-19 - 2-16	Mayo	Dr Hyde Park
	B Mulry 1-3, R Fallon (3f) and J Hardiman (2f) 0-3 each, C Mulry, C Cosgrove, C Murray and S Canning 0-2 each, A Donnelly and J Dowling 0-1 each.	Report	C Phillips 1-6 (0-3f, 0-2 ‘65s), S Boland 0-4 (1f), S Regan 1-2 (1-0pen), E Delaney and J Heraty 0-2 each.

== Knockout stage ==
=== Final ===
2 June 2024 Final	Donegal	3-17 - 0-22	Mayo	Croke Park
	J Cronolly-McGee 2-0, R Campbell 1-3, G Gilmore 0-5 (2f, 1 65’), L McKinney 0-2, D Cullen 0-2, S McVeigh 0-2, S Gillespie 0-1, P Kelly 0-1, B McIntyre 0-1.	Report	S Boland 0-9 (2f), L Lavin 0-3, S Kenny 0-3, E Delaney 0-2, C Phillips 0-1, B Douglas 0-1f, J Heraty 0-1, S Regan 0-1, A Phillips 0-1.	Referee: P Owens (Down)

- Donegal are promoted to the 2025 Christy Ring Cup

== Statistics ==
=== Top scorers ===
Overall

Rank	Player	County	Tally	Total	Matches	Average
1	Alex O'Boyle	Armagh	2-45	51	5	10.20
2	Darren Geoghegan	Louth	1-44	47	5	9.40
2	Niall Arthur	Monaghan	0-47	47	5	9.40
4	Gerard Gilmore	Donegal	1-40	43	5	8.60
5	Cormac Phillips	Mayo	4-23	35	6	5.83
6	Shane Boland	Mayo	1-30	33	6	5.50
7	Liam McKinney	Donegal	1-22	25	6	4.16
8	Cian Murray	Roscommon	3-13	22	5	4.40
8	Paddy Fallon	Roscommon	0-22	22	4	5.50
10	Seán Regan	Mayo	4-09	21	6	3.50
10	Ruairí Campbell	Donegal	3-12	21	6	3.50

In a single game

Rank	Player	Club	Tally	Total	Opposition
1	Niall Arthur	Monaghan	0-14	14	Roscommon
2	Tomás Galvin	Armagh	2-07	13	Monaghan
2	Gerard Gilmore	Donegal	1-10	13	Monaghan
2	Darren Geoghegan	Louth	0-13	13	Armagh
2	Alex O'Boyle	Armagh	0-13	13	Roscommon
2	Darren Geoghegan	Louth	0-13	13	Donegal
7	Niall Arthur	Monaghan	0-12	12	Armagh
8	Cian Murray	Roscommon	3-02	11	Monaghan
8	Cormac Phillips	Mayo	2-05	11	Louth
10	Darren Geoghegan	Louth	1-07	10	Monaghan
10	Alex O'Boyle	Aramgh	1-07	10	Monaghan
10	Alex O'Boyle	Aramgh	0-10	10	Louth
10	Gerard Gilmore	Donegal	0-10	10	Roscommon

== Miscellaneous ==
- Donegal won their 1st championship in 4 years, last winning the 2020 Nicky Rackard Cup.
- Donegal become the first county to win 4 Nicky Rackard Cups.

== See also ==
- 2024 All-Ireland Senior Hurling Championship (Tier 1)
- 2024 Leinster Senior Hurling Championship
- 2024 Munster Senior Hurling Championship
- 2024 Joe McDonagh Cup (Tier 2)
- 2024 Christy Ring Cup (Tier 3)
- 2024 Lory Meagher Cup (Tier 5)
