= 2023 Nicky Rackard Cup =

Hurling competition

- Dates: 15 April – 3 June 2023
- Teams: 6
- Champions: Wicklow (1st title)
- Runners-up: Donegal
- Relegated: Fermanagh

Tournament statistics
- Matches played: 16

The 2023 Nicky Rackard Cup was the 19th staging of the Nicky Rackard Cup since its establishment by the Gaelic Athletic Association in 2005. Wicklow were the winners, defeating Donegal in the final.

== Team changes ==
=== To Championship ===
Relegated from the Christy Ring Cup

- Wicklow

Promoted from the Lory Meagher Cup

- Louth

=== From Championship ===
Promoted to the Christy Ring Cup

- Tyrone

Relegated to the Lory Meagher Cup

- Warwickshire

== Format ==
=== Format ===
The 2023 Nicky Rackard Cup employs a round-robin system, contested within a single group of 6 county teams. At the completion of the round-robin, the top two teams proceed to contest the Nicky Rackard Cup final.

Aside from the trophy itself, the reward for victory in the cup is promotion to the 2024 Christy Ring Cup, with their place in the 2024 Nicky Rackard Cup taken by the bottom-placed team in that year's Christy Ring Cup.

There is no direct entry route to the 2023 All-Ireland Senior Hurling Championship for 2023 Nicky Rackard Cup teams.

The bottom team in the group stage are relegated to the 2024 Lory Meagher Cup, being replaced by the champions of the 2023 Lory Meagher Cup.

=== Teams by province ===
The participating teams, listed by province, with numbers in parentheses indicating final positions in the 2023 National Hurling League before the championship were:

Britain (0)

- None participated

Connacht (1)

- Roscommon (24)

Leinster (2)

- Louth (29)
- Wicklow (21) (debut)

Munster (0)

- None participated

Ulster (3)

- Armagh (26)
- Donegal (20)
- Fermanagh (31)

== Teams ==
=== General Information ===
County	Last Cup Title	Last Provincial Title	Last All-Ireland Title	Position in 2022 Championship	Appearance
Armagh	2012	—	—	4th	14th
Donegal	2020	1932	—	3rd	15th
Fermanagh	—	—	—	5th	7th
Louth	—	—	—	Champions (Lory Meagher Cup)	15th
Roscommon	2015	1913	—	Runners-up	10th
Wicklow	—	—	—	6th (Christy Ring Cup)	1st

=== Personnel and kits ===
County	Manager	Captain(s)	Sponsor
Armagh			
Donegal			
Fermanagh			
Louth			
Roscommon			
Wicklow			

== Group Stage ==
=== Table ===
Pos	Team	Pld	W	D	L	SF	SA	Diff	Pts	Qualification
1	Wicklow	5	5	0	0	15-107	7-62	+69	10	Advance to Knockout Stage
2	Donegal	5	4	0	1	9-103	9-74	+29	8	Advance to Knockout Stage
3	Armagh	5	2	0	3	11-80	8-110	-21	4	
4	Roscommon	5	2	0	3	11-70	11-107	-37	4	
5	Louth	5	1	1	3	8-81	17-83	-29	3	
6	Fermanagh	5	0	1	4	7-82	9-87	-11	1	Relegation to Lory Meagher Cup

=== Round 1 ===
16 April Round 1	Donegal	1-21 - 0-18	Fermanagh	Letterkenny

16 April Round 1	Roscommon	0-18 - 2-24	Armagh	Dr. Hyde Park

16 April Round 1	Wicklow	4-25 - 0-13	Louth	Aughrim

=== Round 2 ===
Louth	1-17 - 5-08	Roscommon

Fermanagh	1-12 - 1-14	Wicklow

Armagh	1-16 - 3-20	Donegal

=== Round 3 ===
Louth	3-17 - 3-17	Fermanagh

Armagh	3-08 - 3-28	Wicklow

Roscommon	2-16 - 2-25	Donegal

=== Round 4 ===
Fermanagh	2-17 - 2-18	Armagh

Donegal	2-19 - 4-07	Louth

Wicklow	5-23 - 2-12	Roscommon

=== Round 5 ===
Armagh	3-14 - 0-27	Louth

Donegal	1-18 - 2-17	Wicklow

Roscommon	2-17 - 1-18	Fermanagh

== Knockout stage ==
=== Final ===
3 June 2023 Final	Wicklow	1-20 - 3-12	Donegal	Croke Park, Dublin
	C Moorehouse 0-9 (5f), A O’Brien 1-1, D Staunton (sl), S Germaine and L Evans 0-2 each,, P Doyle, E McCormack, D Maloney and M Boland 0-1 each	Report	L White 1-2 (1-1f, 1’65) R McDermott 0-3, L McKinney 1-1, R Hilferty 1-0, J O’Loughlin, B McIntyre, R Campbell, D Cullen, G Gilmore (sl) and C McDermott 0-1 each

Wicklow are promoted to the 2024 Christy Ring Cup.

== Stadia and locations ==
County	Location	Province	Stadium	Capacity
Armagh	Armagh	Ulster	Athletic Grounds	18,500
Donegal	Ballybofey	Ulster	MacCumhaill Park	18,000
Fermanagh	Enniskillen	Ulster	Brewster Park	20,000
Louth	Drogheda	Leinster	Drogheda Park	3,500
Roscommon	Roscommon	Connacht	Dr Hyde Park	25,000
Wicklow	Aughrim	Leinster	Aughrim County Ground	7,000

== Statistics ==
=== Scoring events ===
- Widest winning margin: 24 points
  - Wicklow 4-25 - 0-13 Louth (Round 1)
- Most goals in a match: 7
  - Wicklow 5-23 - 2-11 Roscommon (Round 4)
- Most points in a match: 44
  - Armagh 2-24 - 0-18 Roscommon (Round 1)
- Most goals by one team in a match: 5
  - Louth 1-17 - 5-08 Roscommon (Round 2)
  - Wicklow 5-23 - 2-11 Roscommon (Round 4)
- Most points by one team in a match: 28
  - Armagh 3-08 - 3-28 Wicklow (Round 3)
- Highest aggregate score: 55 points
  - Wicklow 5-23 - 2-11 Roscommon (Round 4)
- Lowest aggregate score: 32 points
  - Fermanagh 1-12 - 1-14 Wicklow (Round 2)

== Miscellaneous ==
- Wicklow won their 1st championship in 20 years, last winning the 2003 All-Ireland Senior B Hurling Championship.
- Wicklow make their debut in the Nicky Rackard Cup.

== See also ==
- 2023 All-Ireland Senior Hurling Championship
- 2023 Leinster Senior Hurling Championship
- 2023 Munster Senior Hurling Championship
- 2023 Joe McDonagh Cup (Tier 2)
- 2023 Christy Ring Cup (Tier 3)
- 2023 Lory Meagher Cup (Tier 5)
