= 2022 Nicky Rackard Cup =

Nicky Rackard Cup hurling championship

- Dates: 10 April – 21 May 2022
- Teams: 6
- Champions: Tyrone; Mickey McShane (manager)
- Runners-up: Roscommon

Tournament statistics
- Matches played: 15
- Goals scored: 65 (4.33 per match)
- Points scored: 553 (36.87 per match)

The 2022 Nicky Rackard Cup was the 18th staging of the Nicky Rackard Cup since its establishment by the Gaelic Athletic Association in 2005. The cup began on 10 April 2022 and ended on 21 May 2022.

== Team changes ==
=== To Championship ===
Relegated from the Christy Ring Cup

- Roscommon

Promoted from the Lory Meagher Cup

- Fermanagh

=== From Championship ===
Promoted to the Christy Ring Cup

- Mayo

Relegated to the Lory Meagher Cup

- Leitrim

== Teams ==
=== General Information ===
County	Last Cup Title	Last Provincial Title	Last All-Ireland Title	Position in 2021 Championship	Appearance
Armagh	2012	—	—	Semi-finals	
Donegal	2020	1932	—	Semi-finals	
Fermanagh	—	—	—	Champions (Lory Meagher Cup)	
Roscommon	2015	1913	—	Quarter-finals (Christy Ring Cup)	
Tyrone	2014	—	—	Runners-up	
Warwickshire	—	—	—	—	

== Competition format ==
=== Cup format ===
The 2022 Nicky Rackard is played on a Round-Robin basis. The counties who finish in the top two places shall qualify for the final, with the winner being promoted to the Christy Ring Cup. The bottom placed team in the Round Robin is relegated to the Lory Meagher Cup.

== Group stage ==
=== Group stage table ===
Pos	Team	Pld	W	D	L	SF	SA	Diff	Pts	Qualification
1	Roscommon	5	4	1	0	17-110	6-79	+64	9	Advance to Knockout Stage
2	Tyrone	5	4	0	1	12-97	8-83	+26	8	Advance to Knockout Stage
3	Donegal	5	3	1	1	4-117	8-76	+29	7	
4	Armagh	5	2	0	3	13-81	16-93	-21	4	
5	Fermanagh	5	1	0	4	9-92	10-87	+2	2	
6	Warwickshire	5	0	0	5	10-56	17-135	-100	0	Relegation to Lory Meagher Cup

=== Fixtures and results ===
==== Round 1 ====
10 April 2022 Round 1	Warwickshire	2-11 - 7-18	Tyrone	Páirc na hÉireann
		Report

10 April 2022 Round 1	Armagh	2-07 - 5-19	Roscommon	Athletic Grounds
		Report

10 April 2022 Round 1	Fermanagh	2-13 - 1-21	Donegal	Maguiresbridge
		Report

==== Round 2 ====
17 April 2022 Round 2	Tyrone	1-18 - 1-14	Fermanagh	Healy Park
		Report

17 April 2022 Round 2	Roscommon	3-26 - 1-14	Warwickshire	Dr. Hyde Park
		Report

17 April 2022 Round 2	Donegal	1-22 - 2-14	Armagh	O'Donnell Park
		Report

==== Round 3 ====
23 April 2022 Round 3	Tyrone	3-17 - 1-15	Armagh	Healy Park

23 April 2022 Round 3	Donegal	1-22 - 3-16	Roscommon	O'Donnell Park
		Report

24 April 2022 Round 3	Fermanagh	2-31- 2-05	Warwickshire	Brewster Park

==== Round 4 ====
7 May 2022 Round 4	Roscommon	3-24 - 0-21	Tyrone	Dr. Hyde Park
		Report

7 May 2022 Round 4	Armagh	3-18 - 2-19	Fermanagh	Athletic Grounds
		Report

8 May 2022 Round 4	Warwickshire	0-10 - 0-33	Donegal	Páirc na hÉireann
		Report

==== Round 5 ====
14 May 2022 Round 5	Warwickshire	5-16 - 5-27	Armagh	Páirc na hÉireann

14 May 2022 Round 5	Tyrone	1-23 - 1-19	Donegal	Healy Park

14 May 2022 Round 5	Fermanagh	2-15 - 3-25	Roscommon	Brewster Park

== Knockout stage ==
=== Final ===
21 May 2022 Final	Roscommon	0-19 - 1-27	Tyrone	Croke Park
		Report		Referee: C McDonald (Antrim)

Tyrone are promoted to the 2023 Christy Ring Cup.
