= 2017 Nicky Rackard Cup =

- Dates: 22 April to 10 June 2017
- Teams: 7 (normally 8)
- Champions: Derry (2nd title); Oisin McCloskey (captain)
- Runners-up: Armagh

Tournament statistics
- Matches played: 10
- Goals scored: 37 (3.7 per match)
- Points scored: 318 (31.8 per match)
- Top scorer(s): David Carvill (2-34)

The 2017 Nicky Rackard Cup was the 13th staging of the Nicky Rackard Cup hurling championship since its establishment by the Gaelic Athletic Association in 2005. It is the third tier of senior inter-county championship hurling.

Mayo, the 2016 champions, were promoted to the 2017 Christy Ring Cup after defeating Derry in the promotion/relegation playoff 1–21 to 1–14.

== Format ==
The 2017 Nicky Rackard Cup is played in a double-elimination format. For clarity, the match-ups are explained in each round below.

The seven teams competing in 2017 were Armagh, Derry, Donegal, Longford, Louth, Monaghan, and Tyrone. Fingal were scheduled to compete but withdrew for 2017.

== Round 1 ==
Six of the seven teams play in Round 1. The seventh team receives a bye.

| 22 April 2017 | Louth | 1-12 - 2-17 | Derry | St. Brigid's Park, Dowdallshill |
| | D Kettle 1-1, P Lynch 0-4 (3fs), D Murphy 0-3, L Dwan 0-2, G Smyth 0-1, M Ryan 0-1. | Report | R Convery 0-11 (10fs), M McGrath 1-0, A Grant 1-0, K Hinphey 0-2, C Steele 0-1, D Cartin 0-1, P Cleary 0-1, L Óg Hinphey 0-1. | Referee: T Carroll (Offaly) |

| 22 April 2017 | Donegal | 1-19 - 0-13 | Armagh | O'Donnell Park, Letterkenny |
| | D Flynn 1-5, L Henderson 0-5 (4f, 1 '45), D Coulter 0-3, J Boyle, G Gilmore 0-2 each, B Lafferty, D Cullen 0-1 each | Report | D Carvill 0-6f, C Carvill, D McKenna 0-2 each, C Corvan, C Devlin, C Gorman 0-1 each |

| 22 April 2017 | Monaghan | 0-16 - 2-11 | Tyrone | St. Mary's Park, Castleblayney |
| | D Meegan (0-10, 8f), F Rafter (0-2), B McGuigan (0-1), C Boyle (0-1), P Treanor (0-1), C Meegan (0-1). | Report | D Casey (1-2, 0-1), J Kelly (0-4), S Óg Grogan (1-0), L Devlin (0-2), P Daly (0-1), C Grogan (0-1), R McKernan (0-1). | Referee: P Murphy (Carlow) |

| Longford | BYE |

== Round 2 ==
=== Round 2A ===
Contested by the three winners of Round 1 and the team that received a bye.

| 29 April 2017 | Tyrone | 4-19 - 0-16 | Donegal | Páirc Naomh Colmcille, Carrickmore |
| 3.00 PM | D Casey (1-10, 6f), C Grogan (2-1), S Óg Grogan (1-1), B McGurk (0-4), J Kelly (0-1); S Donnelly (0-1), T Morgan (0-1). | Report | L Henderson (0-6, 1 ’65, 5f); G Gilmore (0-3); D Flynn (0-3), J Boyle (0-2), P Doherty (0-1); S McVeigh (0-1). | Referee: J Murphy (Limerick) |

| 29 April 2017 | Derry | 8-21 - 1-14 | Longford | Owenbeg Centre, Dungiven |
| | B Rogers (3-2), A Grant (2-5, one goal from penalty, four points from frees), B Cassidy (2-4), G Bradley (1-2), A Kelly (0-3), K Hinphey (0-1), D Cartin (0-1), P Cleary (0-1), E McGuckin (0-1), C McKaigue (0-1). | Report | P Walsh (0-8, seven frees), E Kiernan (1-0), R Murray (0-2), S Hannon (0-2), C Mullane (0-1), J Mulhern (0-1). |

=== Round 2B ===
One match contested by two of the three losers of Round 1. The other losing team from Round 1 receives a bye.

| 29 April 2017 | Armagh | 0-23 - 2-09 | Louth | Athletic Grounds, Armagh |
| | D Carvill 0-11, Conor Corvan 0-5, J Corvan 0-2, C Corvan 0-2, N Curry 0-1, D Magee 0-1, D McKenna 0-1. | | D Murphy 0-4, G Kerrigan 1-0, M Ryan 1-0, R Maher 0-2, P McCormack 0-1, D Kettle 0-1, D Ryan 0-1. |

| Monaghan | BYE |

== Quarter-finals ==
The two losers of round 2A played the winner of round 2B and Monaghan, who had received a bye from that round. These two matches are referred to as quarter-finals.

| 6 May 2017 | Armagh | 4-20 - 0-12 | Longford | St. Oliver Plunkett Park, Crossmaglen |
| 3.00 PM | C Corvan 1-7 (4f), D Carvill 1-6 (5f), F Bradley 1-1, R Gaffney 1-0, N Curry 0-2; C Carvill, D McKenna, O Curry, C Gorman 0-1 each. | Report | P Walsh 0-7 (6f, 1 sl), R Murray 0-2, S O'Brien 0-2; S Hannon 0-1. | Referee: J Connors (Donegal) |

| 6 May 2017 | Monaghan | 1-16 - 1-12 | Donegal | Grattan Park, Inniskeen |
| 3.00 PM | F Rafter 0-9 (4f), T Campbell 1-1, B McGuigan 0-3, C Boyle and M Treanor 0-1 each. | Report | D Flynn 1-3, L Henderson 0-5 (2f), D Coulter 0-3, J Boyle 0-1. |

== Semi-finals ==
The winners of round 2A play the winners of the two quarter-finals.

| 20 May 2017 | Tyrone | 1-14 - 2-25 | Armagh | Páirc Naomh Colmcille, Carrickmore |
| 15:00 | B McGurk 1-1, D Casey 0-11 (8f, 1 ’65), C Grogan, R McKernan 0-1 each. | Report | D Carvill 1-11 (0-6f), N Curry 1-4 (1-0 pen, 0-2f), R Gaffney, C Corvan (1f) 0-3 each, F Bradley, D McKenna, D Magee, D Gaffney 0-1 each. |

| 20 May 2017 | Monaghan | 1-12 - 6-17 | Derry | Grattan Park, Inniskeen |
| 17:00 | D Meegan 0-6 (5f), S Lambe 0-4 (1f), T Campbell 1-0, M Treanor and P Treanor 0-1 each. | Report | B Rodgers 3-1, A Grant 1-4, R Convery 1-3, B Cassidy 1-2, M McGrath 0-4, D Cartin and A Kelly 0-2 each. |

== Final ==
The winners of the Nicky Rackard Cup (tier 3) are automatically promoted to next year's Christy Ring Cup (tier 2).

| 10 June 2017 | Armagh | 2-15 - 3-23 | Derry | Croke Park, Dublin |
| 15.00 | A Grant 1-5 (0-4f), B Cassidy 1-4, G Bradley 1-3, C McKaigue, B Rogers, R Convery (1f, 1 ’65) 0-3 each, C Doherty, K Hinphey 0-1 | Report | R Gaffney 2-0, D Carvill 0-7 (6f), C Carvill 0-3, E McGuinness 0-2, C Corvan, D Gaffney, N Curry 0-1 | Referee: S Hynes (Galway) |

== Bracket ==
Round 1 Round 2B
Louth | 1-12
Derry | 2-17
Longford
(Bye)
Monaghan
(Bye)
Armagh | 0-23
Louth | 2-09
Monaghan | 0-16
Tyrone | 2-11
Donegal | 1-19
Armagh | 0-13

Round 2A; Quarter-finals
Derry | 8-21
Longford | 1-14
Donegal | 1-12
Monaghan | 1-16
Armagh | 4-20
Longford | 1-12
Tyrone | 4-19
Donegal | 0-16

Semi-finals
Derry | 6-17
Monaghan | 1-12
Armagh | 2-25
Tyrone | 1-14

Final
Derry | 3-23
Armagh | 2-15
Relegation Playoff
Louth
(Cancelled)

== Relegation play-off (cancelled) ==
Normally contested by the two losers from round 2B as both these teams lost their first two matches. In 2017, no team was relegated as Fingal withdrew, thereby creating a vacant place in the normal eight-team Nicky Rackard Cup which was taken up by Warwickshire, the winners of the 2017 Lory Meagher Cup.

== Scoring statistics ==
Top scorers overall

| Rank | Player | Team | Tally | Total |
|---|---|---|---|---|
| 1 | David Carvill | Armagh | 2-34 | 40 |
| 2 | Damian Casey | Tyrone | 2-23 | 29 |
| 3 | Alan Grant | Derry | 4-09 | 21 |
| 3 | Brendan Rogers | Derry | 6-03 | 21 |
| 5 | Davin Flynn | Donegal | 2-11 | 17 |
| 5 | Ruairí Convery | Derry | 1-14 | 17 |
| 7 | Conor Corvan | Armagh | 1-13 | 16 |
| 7 | Lee Henderson | Donegal | 0-16 | 16 |
| 7 | Donal Meegan | Monaghan | 0-16 | 16 |
| 10 | Brian Cassidy | Derry | 3-06 | 15 |
| 10 | Patrick Walsh | Longford | 0-15 | 15 |

Top scorers in a single game

| Rank | Player | Team | Tally | Total | Opposition |
|---|---|---|---|---|---|
| 1 | David Carvill | Armagh | 1-11 | 14 | Tyrone |
| 2 | Damian Casey | Tyrone | 1-10 | 13 | Donegal |
| 3 | Brendan Rogers | Derry | 3-02 | 11 | Longford |
| 3 | Alan Grant | Derry | 2-05 | 11 | Longford |
| 3 | Damian Casey | Tyrone | 0-11 | 11 | Armagh |
| 3 | Ruairí Convery | Derry | 0-11 | 11 | Louth |
| 3 | David Carvill | Armagh | 0-11 | 11 | Louth |
| 8 | Brendan Rogers | Derry | 3-01 | 10 | Monaghan |
| 8 | Brian Cassidy | Derry | 2-04 | 10 | Longford |
| 8 | Conor Corvan | Armagh | 1-07 | 10 | Longford |
| 8 | Donal Meegan | Monaghan | 0-10 | 10 | Tyrone |
