= Brendan Rogers (dual player) =

Dual player of Gaelic games for Derry and Slaughtneil

Personal information
- Born: 20 April 1994 (age 32) Maghera, Northern Ireland
- Occupation: IT Engineer
- Height: 6 ft 2 in (188 cm)

Sport
- Football Position: Midfield/Full-back
- Hurling Position: Right wing-forward
Club
- Years: Club
- Slaughtneil
Club titles
	Football	Hurling
Derry titles	5	11
Ulster titles	3	4
All-Ireland titles	0	0
Inter-county
- Years: County
- 2014–: Derry
Inter-county titles
	Football	Hurling
Ulster Titles	2	0
All-Ireland Titles	0	0
League titles	0	0
All-Stars	0	0

Brendan Rogers (born 20 April 1994) is a dual player of Gaelic games, i.e. hurling and Gaelic football, who plays for Derry Championship club Slaughtneil and the Derry senior teams.

== Career ==
Rogers first came to prominence as a dual player at club level with Slaughtneil. He has been involved during a golden age for the club and lined out when the club lost the All-Ireland club football finals in 2015 and 2017. Rogers has also won a combined total of 6 Ulster Club Championships and 15 County Championship titles across both codes. At inter-county level, he progressed through the minor and under-21 teams as a dual player before eventually joining the Derry senior teams in both codes. Rogers was part of the Nicky Rackard Cup-winning team in 2017.

== Honours ==
Slaughtneil

- Ulster Senior Club Football Championship: 2014, 2016, 2017
- Ulster Senior Club Hurling Championship: 2016, 2017, 2019, 2021, 2024, 2025
- Derry Senior Football Championship: 2014, 2015, 2016, 2017, 2020
- Derry Senior Hurling Championship: 2013, 2014, 2015, 2016, 2017, 2018, 2019, 2020, 2021, 2022, 2023, 2024, 2025, 2026

Derry

- Ulster Senior Football Championship: 2022, 2023
- Nicky Rackard Cup: 2017

Individual

- The Sunday Game Team of the Year (1): 2023
