= Keith Higgins =

Mayo Gaelic footballer and hurler

Personal information
- Native name: Ceiteach Ó hUiginn (Irish)
- Born: 25 February 1985 (age 41) Ballyhaunis, Ireland
- Height: 5 ft 11 in (180 cm)

Sport
- Sport: Dual player
- Position: Left corner-back
Club
- Years: Club
- Ballyhaunis GAA
Club titles
	Football	Hurling
Mayo titles	0	13
Connacht titles	0	0
All-Ireland titles	0	0
Inter-county
- Years: County
- 2005–2021 2003–: Mayo (F); Mayo (H)
Inter-county titles
- NFL: 1
- All Stars: 4
Connacht Titles	8	

Keith Higgins (Irish: Ceiteach Ó hUiginn) is an Irish sportsman and Gaelic football manager. He has played both Gaelic football and hurling for Ballyhaunis and Mayo GAA, the latter until his retirement in January 2021.

In 2006, he was the All Stars Young Footballer of the Year. He also captained both the Mayo under-21 football and hurling teams to All-Ireland Championships. Injury ruled him out of the 2007 championship. Higgins also represented Mayo at senior level in both codes, played for Connacht in hurling's Railway Cup, winning a medal in 2005, while in 2014 he became the first Connacht player to win football and hurling Railway Cups after Connacht won a first title since 1968.

Hurling is his first love. He plays it for Ballyhaunis. In 2005, Higgins won a Christy Ring Cup All Star while playing for the Mayo county team. In 2008, he was nominated for the Christy Ring Cup Player of the Year award. Higgins was voted as the Cadbury's Hero of the Future in 2006.

During Mayo's 2011 NFL campaign, Higgins received praise for his outstanding performances in right half back.

Higgins retired from inter-county football in January 2021. However, he expressed the wish to continue playing hurling for Mayo. He was revealed as Mayo hurling team captain in May 2021.

On 10 September 2025, Mayo GAA confirmed Higgins as the new Mayo U20 football manager.

== Honours ==
Football

- Connacht Senior Football Championship (8): 2006, 2009, 2011–2015, 2020
- National Football League (1): 2019
- Connacht Under-21 Football Championship (1): 2006
- All-Ireland Under-21 Football Championship (1): 2006
- Railway Cup (1): 2014
- Sigerson Cup (1): 2005
- GAA GPA All Stars Awards (4): 2012–2014, 2017
- All Star Young Footballer of the Year (1): 2006

Hurling

- All-Ireland Junior Hurling Championship (1): 2003
- Connacht Junior Hurling Championship (1): 2003
  - National Hurling League Division 2B (1): 2018
- National Hurling League Division 3 (1): 2005
- Railway Cup (1): 2004
- Nicky Rackard Cup (2): 2016, 2021 (c)
- Christy Ring Cup All Star (1): 2008
- Nicky Rackard Cup Hurler of the Year (1): 2021

Awards
Preceded by Incumbent	U21 Footballer of the Year; 2006	Succeeded by Fintan Goold (Cork)
