= 2021 Nicky Rackard Cup =

Nicky Rackard Cup hurling championship

- Dates: 26 June – 31 July 2021
- Teams: 5
- Champions: Mayo (2nd title); Keith Higgins (captain); Derek Walsh (manager)
- Runners-up: Tyrone; Damian Casey (captain); Michael McShane (manager)
- Relegated: Leitrim

Tournament statistics
- Matches played: 8
- Goals scored: 27 (3.38 per match)
- Points scored: 305 (38.13 per match)
- Top scorer(s): Declan Coulter (1-34)

The 2021 Nicky Rackard Cup was the 17th staging of the Nicky Rackard Cup since its establishment by the Gaelic Athletic Association in 2005. The cup began on 26 June 2021 and ended on 31 July 2021.

Longford and Monaghan did not participate in the competition after being relegated in 2020. Donegal were the defending champions, however, they were beaten by Tyrone in the semi-final. Leitrim were relegated after a defeat by Armagh.

The final was played on 31 July 2021 at Croke Park in Dublin, between Mayo and Tyrone, in what was their first ever meeting in a final. Mayo won the match by 2-27 to 1-14 to claim their second cup title overall and a first title since 2016.

Donegal's Declan Coulter was the Nicky Rackard Cup's top scorer with 1-34.

== Team changes ==
=== To Championship ===
Relegated from the Christy Ring Cup

- None

Promoted from the Lory Meagher Cup

- None

=== From Championship ===
Promoted to the Christy Ring Cup

- None

Relegated to the Lory Meagher Cup

- Longford
- Monaghan

== Competition format ==
=== Cup format ===
The format has been changed for 2021 with 5 teams playing across two groups, one with 3 teams and one with 2 teams based on an open draw.

Group A will feature 3 teams and be played in a single Round Robin format with each team having one home game and one away game.

Group B will feature 2 teams who will play a single fixture.

All teams will play a knockout format after this group stage, with the group winners and second-placed team in Group A being placed in the semi-finals. A tie between the third-placed team in Group A and second-placed team in Group B will determine the fourth semi-finalist.

=== Promotion ===
The winner of the final will be promoted to the Christy Ring Cup.

=== Relegation ===
The loser of the quarter-final will be relegated to the Lory Meagher Cup

== Group stage ==
=== Group A ===
Pos	Team	Pld	W	D	L	SF	SA	Diff	Pts	Qualification
1	Mayo	2	2	0	0	2-43	0-26	+23	4	Advance to Semi-Finals
2	Donegal	2	1	0	1	1-47	6-24	+5	2	Advance to Semi-Finals
3	Leitrim	2	0	0	2	4-19	1-56	-28	0	Advance to Quarter-Finals

==== Group A round 1 ====
26 June 2021 Round 1	Donegal	0-17 - 2-14	Mayo	O'Donnell Park
	D Coulter (0-9, 4f, 1 ’65), R Ryan (0-3); B Lafferty (0-2), S McVeigh (0-1), N Cleary (0-1),	Report	S Boland (0-9, 4f); K Higgins (1-3, 1f, 1 ’65), A Phillips (1-0), B Hunt (0-1), E Delaney (0-1).	Referee: K Bardy (Louth)

==== Group A round 2 ====
3 July 2021 Round 2	Mayo	0-29 - 0-10	Leitrim	Elverys McHale Park
	K Higgins 0-9, 4f, S Boland 0-6, 4f; A Phillips 0-3, J Coyne, K Kiely & Gary Nolan 0-2 each, B Hunt, S Regan, M Phillips, C Phillips & S Kenny 0-1 each	Report	G O’Hagan 0-7, 4f; D McGovern, K McDermott & L Donnellan (f) 0-1 each

==== Group A round 3 ====
10 July 2021 Round 3	Leitrim	4-10 - 1-27	Donegal	Avant Money Páirc Seán Mac Diarmada
	D Kelleher 2-0; G O’Hagan 0-5, 3f; B Murray 1-1; J McNabola 1-0; K McDermott 0-2; C O’Donovan & L Moreton 0-1 each	Report	D Coulter 1-10, 1 pen, 7f, 1 65; R Ryan 0-7, 3f; G Gilmore 0-5; B Lafferty 0-3; C McDermott & J O’Loughlin 0-1 each

=== Group B ===
Pos	Team	Pld	W	D	L	SF	SA	Diff	Pts	Qualification
1	Tyrone	1	1	0	0	1-18	1-16	+2	2	Advance to Semi-Finals
2	Armagh	1	0	0	1	1-16	1-18	-2	0	Advance to Quarter-Finals

==== Group B round 1 ====
3 July 2021 Round 1	Armagh	1-16 - 1-18	Tyrone	Athletic Grounds
	F Donnelly 0-6, D Magee 1-2, S McKearney 0-2, P McBride 0-2, E McGuinness 0-1, J Short 0-1, T O'Neill 0-1, P McKearney 0-1.		D Casey 0-10, B McGurk 1-1, L Devlin 0-2, M Little 0-2, R Weir 0-1, C Kearns 0-1, C Ferguson 0-1.

== Knockout stage ==
=== Bracket ===
Quarter-Finals - 17 July
2B	Armagh	7-25
3A	Leitrim	1-21

Semi-Finals - 24 July
1A	Mayo	2-23
2B	Armagh	2-09
1B	Tyrone	2-24
2A	Donegal	1-21

Final - 31 July
1A	Mayo	2-27
1B	Tyrone	1-14

=== Quarter-final ===
17 July 2021 Quarter-final	Armagh	7-25 - 1-21	Leitrim	Kingspan Breffni Park
	D Magee 5-2; F Donnelly 0-8, 3f; P McKearney & P McBride 1-2 each; T O’Neill & O Curry 0-3 each; J Shortt 0-2; M Moan, E McGuinness, S McKearney 0-1 each	Report	G O'Hagan 0-11, 10f; K McDermott (f) & B Murray 0-3 each, 1f; D Kelleher 1-0; J McNabola, L Moreton, L Donnellan (f) 0-1 each

=== Semi-finals ===
24 July 2021 Semi-final	Mayo	2-23 - 2-09	Armagh	Avant Money Páirc Seán Mac Diarmada
	K Higgins (0-11, 10f), A Phillips (1-3), C Freeman (1-1), S Kenny (0-4, 2f), S Regan (0-2), J Coyne (0-1) and B Morley (0-1)	Report	F Donnelly (1-3, 0-2f), S Doherty (1-0, 1-0 pen), P McBride (0-2), D Magee (0-2), M McClatchey (0-1) and S McKearney (0-1)

24 July 2021 Semi-final	Tyrone	2-24 - 1-21	Donegal	Páirc Naomh Colmcille
	D Casey (0-11, 10f), C Grogan (1-4), C Ferguson (1-4), L Devlin (0-3); CJ McGourty (0-2)	Report	D Coulter (0-15, 12f), C Matthewson (1-1), R Ryan (0-2), D Cullen (0-1), B Lafferty (0-1), G Gilmore (0-1).

=== Final ===
31 July 2021 Final	Mayo	2-27 - 1-14	Tyrone	Croke Park
	C Freeman 1-4, K Higgins 0-7 (0-1f, 0-1 65), S Regan 1-3, S Boland 0-3 (0-2f), A Phillips 0-3, B Morley 0-2, C Phillips 0-1, S Kenny 0-1 (0-1f), J Coyne 0-1, G Nolan 0-1, O Greally 0-1.	Report	D Casey 0-9 (0-5f), C Grogan 1-0, C Kearns 0-3, B McGurk 0-1, T Morgan 0-1.	Referee: T Fitzsimons (Offaly)

== Statistics ==
=== Top scorers ===
Top scorer overall

Rank	Player	Club	Tally	Total	Matches	Average
1	Declan Coulter	Donegal	1-34	37	3	12.33
2	Keith Higgins	Mayo	1-30	33	4	8.33
3	Damian Casey	Tyrone	0-30	30	3	10.00
4	Danny Magee	Armagh	6-06	24	3	8.00
5	Gavin O'Hagan	Leitrim	0-23	23	3	7.66
6	Shane Boland	Mayo	0-18	18	3	6.00
7	Fionntán Donnelly	Armagh	1-17	20	3	6.66
8	Adrian Phillips	Mayo	2-09	15	4	3.75
9	Richie Ryan	Donegal	0-12	12	3	4.00
10	Cathal Freeman	Mayo	2-05	11	2	5.50

In a single game

Rank	Player	Club	Tally	Total	Opposition
1	Danny Magee	Armagh	5-02	17	Leitrim
2	Declan Coulter	Donegal	0-15	15	Tyrone
3	Declan Coulter	Donegal	1-10	13	Leitrim
4	Gavin O'Hagan	Leitrim	0-11	11	Armagh
4	Keith Higgins	Mayo	0-11	11	Armagh
4	Damian Casey	Tyrone	0-11	11	Donegal
7	Damian Casey	Tyrone	0-10	10	Armagh
8	Declan Coulter	Donegal	0-09	9	Mayo
8	Shane Boland	Mayo	0-09	9	Donegal
8	Keith Higgins	Mayo	0-09	9	Leitrim
8	Damian Casey	Tyrone	0-09	9	Mayo
