= 2006 Nicky Rackard Cup final =

Hurling decider

- Event: 2006 Nicky Rackard Cup
Derry	Donegal
5-15	1-11
- Date: 12 August 2006
- Venue: Croke Park, Dublin
- Referee: Dominic Connolly (Kilkenny)

The 2006 Nicky Rackard Cup final was a hurling match played at Croke Park on 12 August 2006 to determine the winners of the 2006 Nicky Rackard Cup, the 2nd season of the Nicky Rackard Cup, a tournament organised by the Gaelic Athletic Association for the third tier hurling teams. The final was contested by Derry of Ulster and Donegal of Ulster, with Derry winning by 5-15 to 1-11.
