= Alan Grant (hurler) =

Irish hurler

Personal information
- Native name: Ailéin Grant (Irish)
- Born: March 1991 (age 35) Derry, Northern Ireland
- Height: 6 ft 1 in (185 cm)

Sport
- Sport: Hurling
- Position: Right wing-forward
Clubs
- Years: Club
- Na Magha; Seán Dolans
Club titles
	Football	Hurling
Derry titles	0	0
College
- Years: College
- Queen's University Belfast
Inter-county
- Years: County
- 2010-present: Derry
Inter-county titles
- Ulster titles: 0
- NHL: 0
- All Stars: 1

Alan Grant (born March 1991) is an Irish hurler who plays as a right wing-forward at senior level for the Derry county team.

Grant made his debut on the inter-county scene when he was selected for the Derry minor team. After two unsuccessful seasons in this grade, he joined the under-21 team. Grant made his debut with the Derry senior team during the 2010 league. Since then he has become a regular member of the team and has won a Nicky Rackard Cup medal. He also won a Christy Ring Champion 15 award.

== Honours ==
Derry

- Nicky Rackard Cup (1): 2017
