= 2006 Nicky Rackard Cup =

Irish hurling competition

- Dates: 10 June — 12 August
- Teams: 12
- Champions: Derry (1st title)
- Runners-up: Donegal
- Promoted: Derry

Tournament statistics
- Matches played: 23

The 2006 Nicky Rackard Cup was the 2006 campaign of the Nicky Rackard Cup and began on Saturday June 10, 2006. 2006 was the second time this new element of the All-Ireland Senior Hurling Championship was introduced. It was devised by the Hurling Development Committee to encourage some of the weaker hurling counties and to give them the chance of playing more games. The final will be played on Sunday, August 13 in Croke Park, Dublin City.

Donegal, Armagh, Longford and Derry played in the semi-finals. Longford qualified by defeating the other two group runners-up. After winning their semi-finals, Donegal and Derry contested the final in Croke Park on August 12. Derry won easily and were promoted to the 2007 Christy Ring Cup.

== Format ==
Twelve teams participate in the 2006 Nicky Rackard Cup. The teams were divided into three groups of four roughly based on geographical criteria. The groups are identical to the Nicky Rackard Cup 2005 except that in 3C Derry replace London, who have been promoted.

- Group 3A: Sligo, Tyrone, Donegal and Fermanagh
- Group 3B: Louth, Cavan, Armagh and Leitrim
- Group 3C: Derry, Warwickshire, Longford and Monaghan

The group winners advance to the semi-finals. The runners-up in Groups 3A and 3B meet in the quarter-final playoffs, with the winners meeting the runner-up in Group 3C in the quarter-final.

== Team changes ==
=== To Championship ===
Relegated from the Christy Ring Cup

- Derry

=== From Championship ===
Promoted to the Christy Ring Cup

- London

== Teams ==
=== General Information ===
County	Last Provincial Title	Last All-Ireland Title	Position in 2005 Championship	Appearance
Armagh	—	—	Quarter-finals	2nd
Cavan	—	—	Group Stage	2nd
Derry	2001	—	Lost relegation playoff (Christy Ring Cup)	1st
Donegal	1932	—	Semi-finals	2nd
Fermanagh	—	—	Group Stage	2nd
Leitrim	—	—	Group Stage	2nd
Longford	—	—	Quarter-finals	2nd
Louth	—	—	Runners-up	2nd
Monaghan	1915	—	Group Stage	2nd
Sligo	—	—	Group Stage	2nd
Tyrone	—	—	Semi-finals	2nd
Warwickshire	—	—	Group Stage	2nd

== Group stage ==
=== Group 3A ===
Pos	Team	Pld	W	D	L	SF	SA	Diff	Pts	Qualification
1	Donegal	3	2	1	0	8-43	2-33	+28	5	Advance to Semi-final
2	Sligo	3	2	1	0	7-43	7-20	+23	5	Advance to Quarter-Final playoff
3	Fermanagh	3	1	0	2	7-31	6-48	-14	2	
4	Tyrone	3	0	0	3	3-33	10-49	-37	0	

==== Matches ====
Date	Venue	Winner	Score	Loser	Score
June 10	Irvinestown	Fermanagh	4-15	Tyrone	1-16
June 10	Ballyshannon	Donegal	3-7	Sligo	1-13
June 24	Omagh	Tyrone	1-10	Donegal	4-19
June 24	Markievicz Park	Sligo	4-15	Fermanagh	3-8
July 8	Enniskillen	Donegal	1-17	Fermanagh	0-08
July 8		Sligo	2-15	Tyrone	1-06

=== Group 3B ===
Pos	Team	Pld	W	D	L	SF	SA	Diff	Pts	Qualification
1	Armagh	3	3	0	0	11-65	2-18	+74	5	Advance to Semi-final
2	Louth	3	2	0	1	12-44	3-28	+43	5	Advance to Quarter-Final playoff
3	Leitrim	3	1	0	2	6-32	10-37	-17	2	
4	Cavan	3	0	0	3	5-10	19-58	-90	0	

==== Matches ====
Date	Venue	Winner	Score	Loser	Score
June 10	Ballinamore	Leitrim	0-10	Louth	3-12
June 10		Armagh	6-20	Cavan	0-2
June 24	Knockbridge	Louth	8-25	Cavan	2-3
June 24	Keady	Armagh	4-20	Leitrim	1-9
July 8	Ballyconnell	Cavan	3-05	Leitrim	5-13
July 8	Drogheda	Louth	1-07	Armagh	1-15

=== Group 3C ===
Pos	Team	Pld	W	D	L	SF	SA	Diff	Pts	Qualification
1	Derry	3	3	0	0	8-54	3-35	+34	6	Advance to Semi-final
2	Longford	3	2	0	1	3-44	3-31	+13	4	Advance to Quarter-Final
3	Warwickshire	3	1	0	2	4-29	4-44	-15	2	
4	Monaghan	3	0	0	3	1-31	6-48	-32	0	

==== Matches ====
Date	Venue	Winner	Score	Loser	Score
June 10	Ballinascreen	Derry	2-14	Longford	0-12
June 10		Warwickshire	1-11	Monaghan	0-9
June 24	Clontibret	Derry	4-24	Monaghan	0-11
June 24	Pearse Park	Longford	2-18	Warwickshire	0-6
July 8	Páirc na hÉireann	Derry	2-17	Warwickshire	3-12
July 8	Clones	Longford	1-14	Monaghan	1-11

== Knockout stage ==
=== Bracket ===
Quarter-final playoffs
Louth	1-18
Sligo	1-13

Quarter-finals
Longford	1-19
Louth	2-07

Semi-finals
Derry	3-10
Armagh	0-10
Donegal	1-19
Longford	0-10

Final
Derry	5-15
Donegal	1-11

=== Quarter-finals ===
15 July 2006 Quarter-final playoff	Louth	1–18 — 1–13	Sligo

22 July 2006 Quarter-final	Longford	1–19 — 2–07	Louth	Longford
				Stadium: Pearse Park

=== Semi-finals ===
29 July 2006 Semi-final	Derry	3–10 — 0–10	Armagh	Armagh
				Stadium: Crossmaglen

30 July 2006 Semi-final	Donegal	1–19 — 0–10	Longford	Fermanagh
				Stadium: Enniskillen

=== Final ===
12 August 2006 Final	Derry	5–15 — 1–11	Donegal	Dublin
		Report		Stadium: Croke Park

Derry are promoted to the 2007 Christy Ring Cup.

== Stadia and locations ==
County	Location	Province	Stadium(s)	Capacity
Armagh	Armagh	Ulster	Athletic Grounds	18,500
Cavan	Cavan	Ulster	Breffni Park	32,000
Derry	Derry	Ulster	Celtic Park	22,000
Donegal	Ballybofey	Ulster	MacCumhaill Park	18,000
Fermanagh	Enniskillen	Ulster	Brewster Park	18,000
Leitrim	Carrick-on-Shannon	Connacht	Páirc Seán Mac Diarmada	9,331
Longford	Longford	Leinster	Pearse Park	10,000
Louth	Drogheda	Leinster	Drogheda Park	3,500
Monaghan	Clones	Ulster	St Tiernach's Park	36,000
Sligo	Sligo	Connacht	Markievicz Park	18,558
Tyrone	Omagh	Ulster	Healy Park	17,636
Warwickshire	Solihull	Britain	Páirc na hÉireann	4,500

== Statistics ==
=== Scoring events ===
- Widest winning margin: 40 points
  - Louth 8-25 - 2-03 Cavan (Round 2)
- Most goals in a match: 10
  - Louth 8-25 - 2-03 Cavan (Round 2)
- Most points in a match: 35
  - Derry 4-24 - 0-11 Monaghan (Round 2)
- Most goals by one team in a match: 8
  - Louth 8-25 - 2-03 Cavan (Round 2)
- Most points by one team in a match: 25
  - Louth 8-25 - 2-03 Cavan (Round 2)
- Highest aggregate score: 58 points
  - Louth 8-25 - 2-03 Cavan (Round 2)
- Lowest aggregate score: 23 points
  - Warwickshire 1-11 - 0-09 Monaghan (Round 1)

== Miscellaneous ==
- Derry won their 1st championship in 5 years, last winning the 2001 Ulster Senior Hurling Championship.

== See also ==
- 2006 All-Ireland Senior Hurling Championship (Tier 1)
- 2006 Christy Ring Cup (Tier 2)
