= 2016 Nicky Rackard Cup =

- Dates: 23 April 2016 – 4 June 2016
- Teams: 8
- Champions: Mayo (1st title); Brian Hunt (captain); J. P. Coen (manager)
- Runners-up: Armagh; Sylvester McConnell (manager)

Tournament statistics
- Matches played: 14
- Goals scored: 66 (4.71 per match)
- Points scored: 442 (31.57 per match)
- Top scorer(s): Damian Casey (2-40)

The 2016 Nicky Rackard Cup was the 12th staging of the Nicky Rackard Cup hurling championship since its establishment by the Gaelic Athletic Association in 2005. The competition began on Saturday 23 April 2016 and ended on Saturday 4 June 2016.

Roscommon were the 2015 champions and were promoted to the Christy Ring Cup.

On 4 June 2016, Mayo won the Nicky Rackard Cup following a 2-16 to 1-15 defeat of Armagh. It was their first Nicky Rackard Cup title.

Tyrone's Damian Casey was the championship's top scorer with 2-40.

== Format ==
The 2016 Nicky Rackard Cup is played in a double-elimination format. For clarity, the draw details are detailed in each round below.

== Teams ==
=== General Information ===
County	Last Cup Title	Last provincial title	Last All-Ireland title	Position in 2015 Championship
Armagh	2012	—	—	Runners-up
Donegal	2013	1932	—	Semi-finals
Fermanagh	—	—	—	Champions (Lory Meagher Cup)
Fingal	—	—	—	Quarter-finals
Longford	—	—	—	Won relegation playoff
Mayo	—	1909	—	Lost relegation playoff (Christy Ring Cup)
Monaghan	—	1915	—	Quarter-finals
Tyrone	2014	—	—	Semi-finals

== Round 1 ==
All eight teams play in Round 1.

23 April 2016 Round 1	Fermanagh	1-15 - 5-12	Monaghan	Brewster Park, Enniskillen
	S Corrigan 0-11 (1 65, 7fs), C McShea 1-00, D McGarry 0-01.	Report	B Mc Guigan 3-01, S Lambe 1-04 (3fs), M Treanor 1-01, N Garland 0-04, F Rafter and D Crowe 0-01 each	Referee: C Cunning (Antrim)

23 April 2016 Round 1	Armagh	2-19 - 3-13	Donegal	Athletic Grounds, Armagh
	R Gaffney (0-8, 6 frees, 2 ’65’s), C Corvan (1-2), C Carvill (1-2), D Carvill (0-3), P McKearney (0-3), N Curry (0-1, free).	Report	S McVeigh (3-2), L Henderson (0-6, 5 frees), B Lafferty (0-2), C Mathewson (0-1), P Doherty (0-1), D Cullen (0-1).	Referee: E Hassan (Derry)

23 April 2016 Round 1	Tyrone	0-17 - 4-19	Mayo	Páirc Naomh Colmcille, Carrickmore
	D Casey 0-12 (9f), C Grogan 0-2, A Kelly, G Gilmore, S Og Grogan 0-1 each.	Report	K Feeney 2-3 (0-2fs), J McManus 1-5, S Boland 1-4, C Freeman 0-5, S Regan, C Scahill 0-1 each.	Referee: J Clarke (Cavan)

23 April 2016 Round 1	Fingal	3-21 - 3-15	Longford	Páirc Barróg, Kilbarrack
	JM Sheridan 0-11 (0-6f, 0-1 65f), TJ Howard 1-3, K O'Sullivan 1-0, D Renahan 1-0 (1-0 pen), S Owens 0-2, P Sheridan 0-2, K O'Flynn 0-1, L Kelly 0-1.	Report	J O'Brien 1-7 (0-1f, 0-1 65), P Farrington 1-3, C Mullane 1-1, B Hanley 0-1, M Coyle 0-1, P Walsh 0-1 (0-1f), K Connelly 0-1,	Referee: J Murphy (Limerick)

== Round 2A ==
Contested by the four winners of Round 1.

30 April 2016 Round 2A	Mayo	0-22 - 1-11	Armagh	James Stephens Park, Ballina
	K Feeney (6f) 0-11; K McDermott 0-3; K Higgins, C Freeman, S Regan and C Scahill 0-2 each.	Report	C Corvan (2f) 1-4, R Gaffney 0-4, P Kearney, D Carvill and S Renaghan 0-1 each.	Referee: P Murphy (Carlow)

30 April 2016 Round 2A	Monaghan	3-14 - 2-19	Fingal	St. Mary's Park, Castleblaney
	S Lambe 1-6(3f), M Treanor 1-1, B McGuigan 1-1, N Garland 0-4(3f), D Crowe, F Rafter 0-1 each.	Report	JM Sheridan 0-8(3f), E Thynne 1-1, I Furlong 0-4, P Graves 0-2, R McGarry, L Kelly, P Sheridan 0-1 each.	Referee: G Quilty (Kilkenny)

== Round 2B ==
Contested by the four losers of Round 1.

30 April 2016 Round 2B	Donegal	3-15 - 3-11	Fermanagh	O'Donnell Park, Letterkenny
	S McVeigh 1-3, L Henderson 0-6 (6f), K Campbell, C Matthewson 1-0 each, B Lafferty 0-2, N Cleary, P Sheridan, D Cullen, R McDermott 0-1 each.	Report	S Corrigan 1-5 (2f), JP McGarry 1-1, R Porteous 1-0, D McGarry 0-2 (1f), R Bogue 0-2 (2f), J Duffy 0-1 (f).	Referee: K McGeeney (Mayo)

30 April 2016 Round 2B	Longford	4-18 - 3-17	Tyrone	Glennon Brothers Pearse Park
	J O’Brien (0-9, 0-4 frees, 0-1 ’65), P Farrington (2-2), C Mullane (1-4), K Conneely (1-1), P Walsh (0-1), P Corcoran (0-1).	Report	D Casey (1-11, 0-6 frees, 0-1 ’65), M Mulgrew (1-0), R McKernan (1-0), A Kelly (0-2), C McNally (0-1), T Morgan (0-1), Conor Grogan (0-1), Gerard Gilmore (0-1).	Referee: J Heffernan (Wexford)

== Quarter-finals ==
The two losers of round 2A (who won a match and lost a match) play the two winners of round 2B (who lost a match and won a match). These two matches are referred to as quarter-finals.

7 May 2016 Quarter-final	Longford	2-11 - 3-19	Armagh	Glennon Brothers Pearse Park
	J O'Brien 1-6f, C Mullane 0-4, K Cox 1-0, P Farrington 0-1.	Report	C Corvan 1-6, D Coulter 1-5, R Gaffney 0-6 (4f), S Renaghan 1-0, J Corvan, P McKearney 0-1 each.	Referee: P Burke (Kilkenny)

7 May 2016 Quarter-final	Monaghan	3-14 - 4-14	Donegal	Páic Grattan, Inniskeen
	F Rafter 0-11 (8f), M Treanor 1-0, S Lambe 1-0, N Garland 0-2 (1f), P Treanor 0-1.	Report	L Henderson 1-6 (1-4f), K Campbell 1-3, C Matthewson 1-1, T Campbell 1-0, R McDermott 1-0, N Cleary 0-3, S McVeigh 0-1.	Referee: M Murtagh

== Semi-finals ==
The winners of round 2A play the winners of the two quarter-finals.

21 May 2016 Semi-final	Mayo	1-18 - 2-11	Donegal	O'Donnell Park, Letterkenny
	K Feeney 0-7 (4f, 1 '65); J McManus 1-1; S Regan 0-4; D McTigue 0-2; C Freeman, S Boland, K McDermott, F Boland 0-1 each.	Report	L Henderson (f) 0-7; D Cullen 1-1; C Matthewson 1-0; S McVeigh, N Cleary, J O'Loughlin 0-1 each.	Referee: J Murphy (Limerick)

21 May 2016 Semi-final	Fingal	1-11 - 3-19	Armagh	Páirc Barróg, Dublin
	JM Sheridan 1-6 (3f, 1 '65), P Sheridan 0-2, K O'Sullivan, E Thyne, P Graves 0-1 each.	Report	R Gaffney 0-7(4f), C Corvan 2-2, D Coulter 1-1, S Renaghan 0-3, C Carvill, E McGuinness, 0-2 each, P McKearney, O Curry 0-1 each.	Referee: P Murphy (Carlow)

== Final ==
4 June 2016 Final	Mayo	2-16 - 1-15	Armagh	Croke Park, Dublin
15.30	K Feeney 1-9 (0-6f), D McTigue 1-0, S Regan, F Boland 0-2 each, S Boland, J McManus, C Scahill 0-1 each.	Report	E McGuinness 1-1, D Coulter 0-5, R Gaffney 0-4 (3f, 1 ’65), D Carvill, C Corvan 0-2 each, C Carvill 0-1.	Referee: J Murphy (Limerick)

== Christy Ring/Nicky Rackard Relegation/Promotion ==
The bottom team in this year's Christy Ring Cup (tier 2) plays the winner of this year's Nicky Rackard Cup (tier 3).

11 June 2016 Play-off	Derry	1-14 - 1-21	Mayo	Ballinamore, Leitrim

== Nicky Rackard/Lory Meagher play-offs ==
=== Bottom play-off ===
Contested by the two losers from round 2B. Both these teams lost their first two matches.

21 May 2016 Bottom play-off	Fermanagh	1-14 - 3-22	Tyrone	O'Neill Park, Dungannon
	S Corrigan (f) 1-6; J Duffy (2f) 0-4; D McGarry, C McShea, C Corrigan (f), R Bogue 0-1 each.	Report	D Casey (9f, 1 '65) 1-17; S Óg Grogan 1-4; M Mulgrew 1-0; T Morgan, E O'Sullivan 0-1 each.	Referee: C Cunning (Antrim)

=== Relegation/Promotion play-off ===
The bottom team in this year's Nicky Rackard Cup (tier 3) plays the winner of this year's Lory Meagher Cup (tier 4).

11 June 2016 Play-off	Fermanagh	0-12 - 7-19	Louth

== Scoring statistics ==
Overall

Rank	Player	County	Tally	Total	Matches	Average
1	Damian Casey	Tyrone	2-40	46	3	15.33
2	Kenny Feeney	Mayo	3-30	39	4	8.75
3	Conor Corvan	Armagh	5-16	31	5	6.20
4	Ryan Gaffney	Armagh	0-29	29	5	5.80
5	J. M. Sheridan	Fingal	1-25	28	3	9.33
5	Joe O'Brien	Longford	2-22	28	3	9.33
5	Seán Corrigan	Fermanagh	2-22	28	3	9.33
5	Lee Henderson	Donegal	1-25	28	4	7.00

Top scorer in a single game

Rank	Player	Team	Tally	Total	Opposition
1	Damian Casey	Tyrone	1-17	20	Fermanagh
2	Damian Casey	Tyrone	1-11	13	Longford
3	Kenny Feeney	Mayo	1-9	12	Armagh
3	Damian Casey	Tyrone	0-12	12	Mayo
5	Seán McVeigh	Donegal	3-2	11	Armagh
5	Seán Corrigan	Fermanagh	0-11	11	Monaghan
5	J. M. Sheridan	Fingal	0-11	11	Longford
5	Kenny Feeney	Mayo	0-11	11	Armagh
5	Fergal Rafter	Monaghan	0-11	11	Donegal
10	Brian McGuigan	Monaghan	3-1	10	Fermanagh
10	Joe O'Brien	Longford	1-7	10	Fingal

== See also ==
- 2016 All-Ireland Senior Hurling Championship
- 2016 Ulster Senior Hurling Championship
- 2016 Christy Ring Cup
- 2016 Lory Meagher Cup
