= 2007 Nicky Rackard Cup final =

Hurling decider

- Event: 2007 Nicky Rackard Cup
Roscommon	Armagh
1-12	0-13
- Date: 11 August 2007
- Venue: Croke Park, Dublin
- Referee: Joe Kelly (Wexford)

The 2007 Nicky Rackard Cup final was a hurling match played at Croke Park on 11 August 2007 to determine the winners of the 2007 Nicky Rackard Cup, the 3rd season of the Nicky Rackard Cup, a tournament organised by the Gaelic Athletic Association for the third tier hurling teams. The final was contested by Roscommon of Connacht and Armagh of Ulster, with Roscommon winning by 1-12 to 0-13.
