= 2009 Nicky Rackard Cup =

- Dates: 6 June – 11 July, 2009
- Teams: 8
- Champions: Meath (1st title)
- Runners-up: London
- Relegated: Monaghan

The 2009 Nicky Rackard Cup is the 5th annual third-tier hurling competition organised by the Gaelic Athletic Association. Seven county teams and one regional team participate in the competition. The teams are Fingal, Monaghan, Louth, Sligo, Meath, London, Armagh and Roscommon.

The winners of the competition were promoted to the 2010 Christy Ring Cup.

On 11 July, Meath won the cup with a 2-18 to 1-15 win over London at Croke Park.

== Team changes ==
=== To Championship ===
Relegated from the Christy Ring Cup

- Armagh
- London
- Meath
- Roscommon

=== From Championship ===
Relegated to the Lory Meagher Cup

- Cavan
- Donegal
- Fermanagh
- Leitrim
- Longford
- South Down
- Tyrone
- Warwickshire

== Format ==
=== New structure ===
The tournament has a double elimination format - each team will play at least two games before being knocked out.

- The eight teams play four Round 1 matches.
  - The winners in Round 1 advance to Round 2A.
  - The losers in Round 1 go into Round 2B.
- There are two Round 2A matches.
  - The winners in Round 2A advance to the semi-finals.
  - The losers in Round 2A go into the quarter-finals.
- There are two Round 2B matches.
  - The winners in Round 2B advance to the quarter-finals.
  - The losers in Round 2B go into the relegation playoff.
    - The losers of the relegation playoff are relegated to the Lory Meagher Cup 2010.
- There are two quarter-final matches between the Round 2A losers and Round 2B winners.
  - The winners of the quarter-finals advance to the semi-finals.
  - The losers of the quarter-finals are eliminated.
- There are two semi-final matches between the Round 2A winners and the quarter-final winners.
  - The winners of the semi-finals advance to the final.
  - The losers of the semi-finals are eliminated.
- The winners of the final win the Nicky Rackard Cup for 2009.

== Results ==
=== Round 1 ===
Date	Venue	Team	Score	Team	Score
June 6	Athleague	Roscommon	1-11	Fingal	1-08
June 6	Sligo	Sligo	0-10	Meath	1-23
June 6	Armagh	Armagh	0-12	London	1-19
June 6	Dundalk	Louth	1-12	Monaghan	1-08

=== Round 2A ===
Date	Venue	Team	Score	Team	Score
June 13	Ruislip	London	1-22	Roscommon	1-11
June 13	Navan	Meath	1-26	Louth	0-10

=== Round 2B ===
Date	Venue	Team	Score	Team	Score
June 13	Sligo	Sligo	0-05	Armagh	3-19
June 13	Clones	Monaghan	2-13	Fingal	1-18

=== Relegation play-off ===
Date	Venue	Team	Score	Team	Score
June 20	Ballinamore	Sligo	3-14	Monaghan	2-9

Monaghan were relegated to the Lory Meagher Cup 2010.

=== Quarter-finals ===
Date	Venue	Team	Score	Team	Score
June 20	Armagh	Armagh	6-26	Roscommon	2-09
June 20	Swords	Fingal	0-16	Louth	1-11

=== Semi-finals ===
Date	Venue	Team	Score	Team	Score
June 27	Ruislip	London	1-19	Fingal	2-08
June 27	Navan	Meath	0-21	Armagh	1-14

=== Final ===
Date	Venue	Team	Score	Team	Score
July 11	Croke Park	London	1-15	Meath	2-18

== See also ==
- 2009 All-Ireland Senior Hurling Championship
- 2009 Ulster Senior Hurling Championship
- 2009 Christy Ring Cup (Tier 2)
- 2009 Lory Meagher Cup (Tier 4)
