= Mervyn Connaughton =

Irish hurler

Personal information
- Born: Athleague, County Roscommon

Sport
- Sport: Hurling
- Position: Forward
Club
- Years: Club
- 1990's-2000's: Athleague
Club titles
- Roscommon titles: 3
Inter-county
- Years: County
- 2000's: Roscommon
Inter-county titles
- Connacht titles: 0
- NHL: 1 Div 3

Mervyn Connaughton is a hurler from County Roscommon, Ireland. He plays with the Roscommon county team. In 2007 he captained them to win the National Hurling League Div 3 title and later the Nicky Rackard Cup, he also later won a Nicky Rackard Cup All Star that year. He plays with his local Athleague club with whom he won Roscommon Senior Hurling Championship medals in 2003, 2006 and 2007.
