= Damian Casey =

Irish hurler (1993–2022)

Personal information
- Native name: Damán Ó Casthasaigh (Irish)
- Born: 1993 Dungannon, County Tyrone, Northern Ireland
- Died: 17 June 2022 (age 29) Spain
- Occupation: Sales

Sport
- Sport: Hurling
- Position: Full-forward
Club
- Years: Club
- Eoghan Ruadh, Dungannon
Club titles
- Tyrone titles: 4
College
- Years: College
- Ulster University
Inter-county*
Years	County	Apps (scores)
2012–2022	Tyrone	101 (39–908)
Inter-county titles
- NHL: 2
- *Inter County team apps and scores correct as of 16:37, 6 March 2018.

Damian Casey (1993 – 17 June 2022) was an Irish hurler who played for the Eoghan Ruadh, Dungannon, club and at senior level for the Tyrone county team. Regarded as his county's greatest ever hurler who—at the time of his death—was "at the peak of his powers", Casey played as a full-forward.

He scored in every game he played for Tyrone at senior level. He was a former captain of his county, including for its first Nicky Rackard Cup win in 2014, when he was 21 years of age. He won the Nicky Rackard Cup again in 2022 in what was his final game for his county, shortly before his death at the age of 29.

== Early life ==
Casey played hurling since he was "four or five". He was the son of Sean, a past chairman of the Dungannon Clarkes club. He was also the son of Susan and had two sisters.

Casey was educated at St Patrick's Academy in Dungannon. He attended, and graduated from, Ulster University, and represented it in the Fitzgibbon Cup. He later lived in the English city of Liverpool.

== Career ==
Casey first emerged as a hurler at juvenile and underage levels with the Eoghan Ruadh, Dungannon club in Dungannon. He advanced onto the club's senior team and was involved in four Tyrone SHC title-winning teams.

Casey made his first appearance on the inter-county scene when he was selected for the Tyrone under-16 hurling team. An All-Ireland medal winner in this grade, he later won an All-Ireland Minor Hurling Championship medal as a member of the Tyrone team. He then joined the under-21 team, before making his senior debut during the 2012 National League. He became a regular member of the starting fifteen and went on to win Nicky Rackard Cup and Lory Meagher Cup titles.

In 2014, Casey captained the first Tyrone team to win a Nicky Rackard Cup. In the final at Croke Park, he scored eight points against Fingal. He was 21 years of age.

In his last league game (2022 National Hurling League, 2 April), he scored 1–10 as part of a three-point win against Armagh that gave Tyrone promotion to Division 2B.

Casey scored fourteen points (including nine from frees and two 65s) from Tyrone's total of 1–27 in the 2022 Nicky Rackard Cup final eleven-point win against Roscommon at Croke Park on 21 May. In the previous game (semi-final) he scored 1–12, enough to see him past the 400-point total in championship games.

His league and championship total was 39 goals and 908 points (a total of 1,025 points). His statistics compare favorably with Patrick Horgan, the Cork hurler who is the record scorer at senior level, with Horgan's point average per game at the time of Casey's death being about 8.4, while Casey's ultimate point average per game was 10.01.

Casey made 101 appearances for his senior county team. Forty of those appearances were in the championship. From his debut in 2012 until his death in 2022, he started in every game and scored in every game. Casey's appearance record contrasted with that of Galway hurler David Burke, who at 32 years of age, became that county's appearance record holder (63) against Cork, on the day after Casey's death.

The Belfast Telegraph interviewed him shortly before his death, with the player commenting on his scoring record, and in particular his free-taking routine:

It's about taking your deep breaths, taking a step back from the ball and having a look at the ball, taking a look at the posts. A couple of steps forward, another couple of breaths... Opposition teams are going to be shouting and roaring, opposition fans are going to be on your back. But it is about having that set routine, going through it every time and it's repetition then... It should all be flowing and natural.

On 18 June 2022, it was announced that Casey had died the previous day in Spain, where he had planned to attend a wedding as a groomsman. Vigils occurred following his death. Those in attendance recited the Hurler's Prayer. Ahead of the 2022 All-Ireland Senior Hurling Championship quarter-finals, which took place at Semple Stadium the day after Casey's death, a minute's silence was held, with RTÉ pundit Anthony Daly stating: "He scored 14 points in Croke Park just a few weeks ago. It's just such a loss".

He was posthumously selected for the Ring, Rackard and Meagher Team of the Year, announced on 18 October 2022 and, three days later, was announced as Nicky Rackard Cup Hurler of the Year. He was also posthumously selected as Ulster GAA Hurler of the Year in November 2022.

== Career statistics ==
As of match played 6 March 2022.

Team	Year	National League			Meagher Cup		Rackard Cup		Ulster Shield		Total	
Team	Year	Division	Apps	Score	Apps	Score	Apps	Score	Apps	Score	Apps	Score
Tyrone	2012	Division 3A	5	0–22	3	1–16	—		—		8	1–38
Tyrone	2013	Division 3A	6	0–46	—		3	0–25	—		9	0–71
Tyrone	2014	Division 3B	4	0–29	—		3	0–29	—		7	0–58
Tyrone	2015	Division 3A	6	4–70	—		4	1–34	—		10	5–104
Tyrone	2016	Division 3A	6	2–67	—		3	2–40	—		9	4–107
Tyrone	2017	Division 3A	6	5–41	—		3	2–23	2	1–21	11	8–85
Tyrone	2018	Division 3A	4	2–45	—		3	1–18	—		7	3–63
Tyrone	2019	Division 3A	5	4–45	—		4	4–46	—		9	8–91
Tyrone	2020	Division 3A	5	2–59	—		3	0–30	—		8	2–89
Tyrone	2021	Division 3A	4	2–34	—		3	0–30	—		7	2–64
Tyrone	2022	Division 3A	4	1–37	—		0	0–00	—		4	1–37
Total			55	22–495	3	1–16	29	10–275	2	1–21	89	34–807

== Honours ==
Eoghan Ruadh Dungannon

- Tyrone Senior Hurling Championship: 2012, 2013, 2018, 2019

Tyrone

- Nicky Rackard Cup: 2014 (c.), 2022
- Lory Meagher Cup: 2012
- National Hurling League Division 3A: 2015 (c.), 2022
- National Hurling League Division 3B: 2014 (c.)

Awards

- GAA/GPA Champion 15: 2019, 2020, 2021
- Nicky Rackard Cup Champion 15: 2013, 2014, 2015, 2016

Sporting positions
Preceded by	Tyrone Senior Hurling Captain; 2014–2015	Succeeded by
Preceded by	Tyrone Senior Hurling Captain; 2021	Succeeded by
Achievements
Preceded by Joe Boyle	Nicky Rackard Cup Final winning captain 2014	Succeeded by Micheál Kelly
