= 2015 Nicky Rackard Cup =

- Dates: 2 May – 6 June 2015
- Teams: 8
- Champions: Roscommon
- Runners-up: Armagh

Tournament statistics
- Matches played: 14

The 2015 Nicky Rackard Cup (tier 3) was the eleventh staging of the Nicky Rackard Cup hurling championship since its establishment by the Gaelic Athletic Association in 2005. The cup competition began on 2 May 2015 and culminated on 13 June 2015. The bottom two teams will play off with the loser playing the winner of the 2015 Lory Meagher Cup (tier 4).

Tyrone were the defending champions and they participated in the competition again after opting not to face Down in the 2014 Christy Ring Cup relegation promotion playoff.

Longford entered the 2015 competition after defeating Sligo in 2014 Nicky Rackard Cup Promotion/relegation playoff.

Roscommon won the title after defeating Armagh by 2–12 to 1–14 in the final.

== Format ==
- Eight teams play in Round 1.
- The Round 1 winners advance to Round 2A. The Round 1 losers go into Round 2B.
- The Round 2A winners advance to the semi-finals. The Round 2A losers go into the quarter-finals.
- The Round 2B winners advance to the quarter-finals. The Round 2B losers go into the relegation playoff.
- The quarter-final winners advance to the semi-final.
- The semi-final winners advance to the final.
- The final winners receive the Nicky Rackard Cup (tier 3) and play the losers of the Christy Ring Cup (tier 2) relegation playoff for the right to play in the 2016 Christy Ring Cup.
- The Round 2B losers play a relegation playoff. The losing team plays the winner of the Lory Meagher Cup (tier 4) with the winner playing in the 2016 Nicky Rackard Cup and the losing team playing in the 2016 Lory Meagher Cup.

== Teams ==
=== General Information ===
County	Cup Titles	Last Cup Title	Position in 2014 Championship
Armagh	2	2012	Lost relegation playoff (Christy Ring Cup)
Donegal	1	2013	Semi-finals
Fingal	0	-	Runners-up
Longford	0	-	Champions (Lory Meagher Cup)
Louth	0	-	Qualifier round 2
Monaghan	0	-	Qualifier round 1
Roscommon	1	2007	Semi-finals
Tyrone	1	2014	Champions

== Round 1 ==
2 May 2015 Round 1	Donegal	0-11 - 1-12	Tyrone	Letterkenny
13:00	L Henderson (0-6), C Matthewson (0-2), J Boyle (0-1), S McVeigh (0-1), J O'Loughlin (0-1)	Report	D Casey (1-7), C Grogan (0-2), J Kelly (0-2), S Grogan (0-1)	Referee: O Elliott

2 May 2015 Round 1	Monaghan	4-10 - 0-10	Longford	Clones
17:00	P Dowdall (3-1), S Lambe (1-2), R Meegan (0-3), M Murphy (0-1), E MacSuibhne (0-1), N Garland (0-1), M Treanor (0-1)	Report	J O'Brien (0-7), L Kelly (0-2), C Kavanagh (0-1)	Referee: G McGrath

2 May 2015 Round 1	Fingal	0-09 - 3-12	Roscommon	Swords
17:00	J M Sheridan (0-6), D Butterly (0-1), N Ring (0-1), C O'Flynn (0-1)	Report	J Fallon (1-6), R O'Meara (1-1), C Kenny (1-0), T Seale (0-1), C Dolan (0-1), C Egan (0-1), A Murphy (0-1), J Coyne (0-1)	Referee: P Murphy (Carlow)

2 May 2015 Round 1	Armagh	2-16 - 2-11	Louth	Athletic Grounds
17:00	R Gaffney (1-6), E McGuinness (1-0), D Coulter (0-3), C Gorman (0-2), C Devlin (0-1), S Renaghan (0-1), C Carvill (0-1), M Moan (0-1), D Carville (0-1)	Report	L Dawn (0-8), S Connelly (1-1), R Maher (1-1), G Smyth (0-1)	Referee: C Cunning

Winners progress to Round 2A. Losers go to Round 2B.

== Round 2 ==
=== Round 2A ===
9 May 2015 Round 2A	Roscommon	1-24 - 0-17	Monaghan	Athleague
14:00	Gerry Fallon (0-7), C Egan (1-3), J Moran (0-3), J Coyne (0-3), C Dolan (0-2), M Kelly (0-1), T Seale (0-1), Gary Fallon (0-1), A Murphy (0-1), C Kenny (0-1), R O'Meara (0-1)	Report	R Meegan (0-8), S Lambe (0-3), N Garland (0-2), M Treanor (0-2), D Crowe (0-1), H Byrne (0-1)	Referee: J Clarke

9 May 2015 Round 2A	Tyrone	0-20 - 3-17	Armagh	Carrickmore
17:00	D Casey (0-9), C Grogan (0-3), M Winters (0-2), S Og Grogan (0-1), P McHugh (0-1), T Morgan(0-1), J Kelly (0-1), M Mulgrew (0-1), G Gilmore (0-1)	Report	C Carvill (2-1), R Gaffney (0-6), M Moan (0-3), E McGuinness (1-0), C Corvan (0-3), D Coulter (0-2), K McKernan (0-1), S Gaffney (0-1)	Referee: E Hassan

Winners progress to the semi-finals. Losers go into the quarter-finals.

=== Round 2B ===
9 May 2015 Round 2B	Donegal	4-21 - 1-9	Longford	Pearse Park
15:00	C Matthewson (1-16), R McDermott (2-2), S McVeigh (1-1), B Lafferty (0-2)	Report	E Donnellan (0-6), J O'Brien (1-0), M Coyle (0-2), J Casey (0-1)	Referee: Justin Heffernan

9 May 2015 Round 2B	Louth	2-08 - 1-21	Fingal	Dowdallshill
17:00	L Dwan (1-5), A Mackin (1-0), G Smyth (0-1), S Conneally (0-1), S Callan (0-1)	Report	J M Sheridan (0-11), P McAllister (1-1), R McGarry (0-2), E O'Connor (0-2), C O'Flynn (0-2), D Hattie (0-1), S O'Brien (0-1), D Butterly (0-1),	Referee: Sean Cleere

Winners go into the quarter-finals. Losers go into the Relegation Playoff

== Quarter-finals ==
16 May 2015 Quarter-Finals	Monaghan	2-13 - 6-12	Donegal	Clones
15:00	R Meegan (0-6), N Garland (2-0), S Lambe (0-3), C McKenna (0-1), D Crowe (0-1), E MacSuibhne (0-1), F Rafter (0-1)	Report	R McDermott (4-0), C Mathewson (1-4), S McVeigh (1-2), K Campbell (0-4), J Boyle (0-1), B Lafferty (0-1)	Referee: Alan Nash

16 May 2015 Quarter-Finals	Fingal	0-20 - 1-21 AET	Tyrone	Swords
16:00	J M Sheridan (0-8), P McAllister (0-3), E O'Connor (0-3), S O'Brien (0-2), C O'Flynn (0-2), D Hattie (0-1), B McCarthy (0-1)	Report	D Casey (0-10), M Mulgrew (1-5), C Grogan (0-3), G Gilmore (0-2), A Kelly (0-1)	Referee: Patrick Murphy

== Semi-finals ==
23 May 2015 Semi-Finals	Tyrone	0-14 - 1-16	Roscommon	Carrickmore
15:00				Referee: Liam Mc Auley

23 May 2015 Semi-Finals	Armagh	1-19 - 1-12	Donegal	Athletic Grounds
16:00				Referee: Colum Cunning

== Final ==
6 June 2015	Armagh	1-14 - 2-12	Roscommon	Croke Park
13:30 BST	R Gaffney (0-8, eight frees), C Carvill (1-0), D Coulter (0-2), N Curry (one 65), D Carvill, C Corvan and E McGuinness 0-1 each	Report	A Murphy (1-1), J Fallon (0-4, four frees), M Kelly (1-0, one free), J Moran (0-3), J Coyne (0-2), K Kilkenny and C Egan (0-1 each)	Referee: John O Brien

== Relegation play-off ==
23 May 2015 Relegation play-off	Longford	2-20 - 2-16 AET	Louth	Mullingar
15:00				Referee: John O Brien
