= Nicky Rackard Cup =

Hurling cup competition

- Current season or competition: 2026 Nicky Rackard Cup
- Code: Hurling
- Founded: 2005; 21 years ago
- Region: Ireland (GAA)
- Trophy: Nicky Rackard Cup
- No. of teams: 6
- Title holders: New York (1st title)
- Most titles: Donegal (4 titles)
- TV partner: TG4
- Official website: Official website

The Nicky Rackard Cup (Irish: Corn Niocláis Mhic Riocaird; often referred to as the Rackard Cup) is an annual hurling competition organised by the Gaelic Athletic Association. The cup forms the fourth-tier of Hurling for senior county teams (the All-Ireland Senior Hurling Championship is the first-tier trophy). It is contested by the six county teams ranked 24–29 in the All-Ireland Senior Hurling Championship. Each year, the champions of the Nicky Rackard Cup are promoted to the Christy Ring Cup, and the lowest finishing team is relegated to the Lory Meagher Cup. The winners of the championship receive the Nicky Rackard Cup, named after former Wexford hurler Nicky Rackard regarded as one of the greatest hurlers of all time.

The Nicky Rackard Cup, which was introduced for the 2005 season, is a recent initiative in providing a meaningful championship for third tier teams deemed "too weak" for any higher grades. It effectively replaced the All-Ireland Junior Hurling Championship (1912–2004). Originally introduced as a third-tier competition, it is currently the fourth tier overall in the inter-county hurling championship system. Between 2005 and 2017 the Nicky Rackard Cup was the third tier hurling championship. With the introduction of the Joe McDonagh Cup, the Nicky Rackard Cup is the second highest tier of the championship system without entry to that year's All-Ireland finals series (the top two teams in the Joe McDonagh Cup usually gain entry to preliminary quarter-finals of the All-Ireland Senior Hurling Championship).

The title has been won by 10 different counties, 8 of whom have won the title more than once. The all-time record-holders are Donegal, who have won the cup on 3 occasions.Roscommon are the title holders, defeating Mayo by 3-16 to 1-21 in the 2025 Nickey Rackard Cup final

== History ==
=== Inauguration of the competition ===
In 2003 the Hurling Development Committee (HDC) was charged with restructuring the entire hurling championship. The committee was composed of chairman Pat Dunny (Kildare), Liam Griffin (Wexford), P. J. O'Grady (Limerick), Ger Loughnane (Clare), Cyril Farrell (Galway), Jimmy O'Reilly (Down), Willie Ring (Cork), Pat Daly (GAA Games Development Officer) and Nicky English (Tipperary). Over the course of three months they held discussions with managers, players and officials, while also taking a submission from the Gaelic Players Association. The basic tenet of the proposals was to structure the hurling championship into three tiers in accordance with 2004 National Hurling League status.

The top tier was confined to 12 teams, while the next twenty teams would contest the second and third tiers which were to be known respectively as the Christy Ring Cup and Nicky Rackard Cup. There would also be promotion-relegation play-offs between the three championship tiers. The HDC also suggested that these games would be played as curtain raisers to All-Ireland quarter-finals and semi-finals.

The proposal were accepted at the 2005 GAA Congress. The Christy Ring Cup and the Nicky Rackard Cup competitions were launched at Croke Park on 8 December 2004.

== Format ==
=== 2005-2006 ===
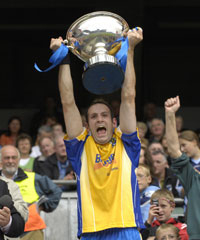
Mervyn Connaughton receiving the Nicky Rackard Cup for Roscommon in 2007

The twelve participating teams were divided into three groups of four and played in a round-robin format. Each team was guaranteed at least three games each. The three group winners qualified for the knock-out semi-finals of the competition. The runners-up in groups 3B and 3C contested a play-off with the winner playing the runner up in group 3A in a lone quarter-final. The winner of that match joined the three group winners in the semi-finals.

=== 2007-2008 ===
The twelve participating teams were divided into four groups of three and played in a round-robin format, thus limiting each team to just two games each. The eventual group winners and runners-up qualified for the knock-out quarter-finals of the competition.

=== 2009-2017 ===
In 2009 a double elimination format was introduced, thus guaranteeing each team at least two games before being eliminated from the competition.

- The eight teams play four Round 1 matches.
  - The winners in Round 1 advance to Round 2A.
  - The losers in Round 1 go into Round 2B.
- There are two Round 2A matches.
  - The winners in Round 2A advance to the semi-finals.
  - The losers in Round 2A go into the quarter-finals.
- There are two Round 2B matches.
  - The winners in Round 2B advance to the quarter-finals.
  - The losers in Round 2B go into the relegation playoff.
    - The losers of the relegation playoff are relegated to the Lory Meagher Cup for the following year.
- There are two quarter-final matches between the Round 2A losers and Round 2B winners.
  - The winners of the quarter-finals advance to the semi-finals.
  - The losers of the quarter-finals are eliminated.
- There are two semi-final matches between the Round 2A winners and the quarter-final winners.
  - The winners of the semi-finals advance to the final.
  - The losers of the semi-finals are eliminated.
- The winners of the final win the Nicky Rackard Cup and are promoted to the Christy Ring Cup for the following year.

=== 2018-present ===
Beginning in 2018, the Nicky Rackard Cup changed format, with initial ties played in group stages, which in 2018 consisted of one of four teams and one of three. Previously it was a double elimination tournament. The top two teams from both groups advance to the cup semi-finals. The bottom team from each group will progress to a relegation final.

The winner of the Nicky Rackard Cup will be promoted to the Christy Ring Cup, For 2018 only, 2 teams will be relegated from the 2018 Christy Ring Cup to the 2019 Nicky Rackard Cup to bring the number of teams in the 2019 edition to an even 8, allowing for two groups of 4.

The loser of the relegation final will be relegated to the Lory Meagher Cup, to be replaced by the winner of the previous years competition.

== Teams ==
=== 2026 Cup ===
Seven counties will compete in the group stage of the 2026 Nicky Rackard Cup:

County	Location	Stadium	Province	Position in 2025 Championship	First year in Championship	In Championship Since	Championship Titles	Last Championship Title
Armagh	Armagh	Athletic Grounds	Ulster	3rd	2005	2019	2	2012
Fermanagh	Enniskillen	Brewster Park	Ulster	6th	2005	2025	0	—
Louth	Drogheda	Drogheda Park	Leinster	5th	2005	2023	0	—
Mayo	Castlebar	MacHale Park	Connacht	Runners-up	2016	2024	2	2021
New York	Bronx	Gaelic Park	North America	Champions (Lory Meagher Cup)	2026	2026	0	—
Sligo	Sligo	Markievicz Park	Connacht	4th	2005	2025	2	2019
Tyrone	Omagh	Healy Park	Ulster	6th (Christy Ring Cup)	2007	2026	2	2015

== Venues ==
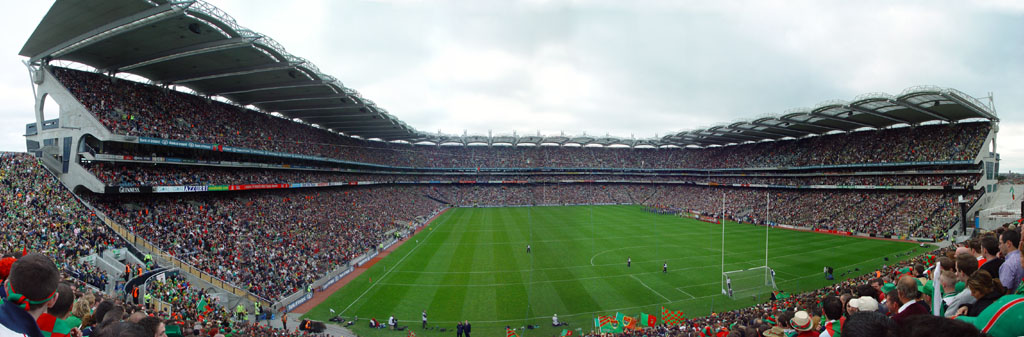
Croke Park in Dublin, hosts the Nicky Rackard Cup Final.

=== Group stage ===
Fixtures in the five group stage rounds of the cup are played at the home ground of one of the two teams. Each team is guaranteed at least two home games. Some teams get three home games.

=== Final ===
The Nicky Rackard Cup final is played at Croke Park.

== List of finals ==
=== List of Nicky Rackard Cup finals ===
Year	Date	Winners		Runners-up		Venue	Winning captain(s)	Winning margin	Referee
Year	Date	County	Score	County	Score	Venue	Winning captain(s)	Winning margin	Referee
2026	30 / 31 May	New York	2-22 (28)	Tyrone	2-17 (23)	Croke Park, Dublin	Johnny Glynn	5	Ciarán McCloskey (Antrim)
2025	31 May	Roscommon	3-16 (25)	Mayo	1–21 (24)	Croke Park, Dublin	Conor Cosgrove & Conor Mulry	1	Conor Doyle (Tipperary)
2024	2 June	Donegal	3-17 (26)	Mayo	0-22 (22)	Croke Park, Dublin	Conor Gartland	4	Peter Owens (Down)
2023	3 June	Wicklow	1-20 (23)	Donegal	3-12 (21)	Croke Park, Dublin	John Henderson	2	James Clarke (Cavan)
2022	May 21	Tyrone	1-27 (30)	Roscommon	0-19 (19)	Croke Park, Dublin	Conor Grogan	11	Colm McDonald (Antrim)
2021	August 31	Mayo	2-27 (33)	Tyrone	1-14 (17)	Croke Park, Dublin	Keith Higgins	16	Richie Fitzsimons (Offaly)
2020	November 22	Donegal	3-18 (27)	Mayo	0-21 (21)	Croke Park, Dublin	Seán McVeigh	6	Kevin Jordan (Tipperary)
2019	June 22	Sligo	2-14 (20)	Armagh	2-13 (19)	Croke Park, Dublin	James Weir	1	James Connors (Donegal)
2018	June 10	Donegal	2-19 (25)	Warwickshire	0-18 (18)	Croke Park, Dublin	Danny Cullen	7	Gearoid McGrath (Wexford)
2017	June 10	Derry	3-23 (32)	Armagh	2-15 (21)	Croke Park, Dublin	Oisín McCloskey	11	Shane Hynes (Galway)
2016	June 4	Mayo	2-16 (22)	Armagh	1-15 (18)	Croke Park, Dublin	Brian Hunt	4	Johnny Murphy (Limerick)
2015	June 6	Roscommon	2-12 (18)	Armagh	1-14 (17)	Croke Park, Dublin	Micheal Kelly	1	John O'Brien (Tipperary)
2014	June 7	Tyrone	1-17 (20)	Fingal	1-16 (19)	Croke Park, Dublin	Damien Casey	1	Declan O'Driscoll (Limerick)
2013	June 8	Donegal	3-20 (29)	Roscommon	3-16 (25)	Croke Park, Dublin	Joe Boyle	4	Patrick Murphy (Carlow)
2012	June 9	Armagh	3-20 (29)	Louth	1-15 (18)	Croke Park, Dublin	Ryan Gaffney	11	Paud O'Dwyer (Carlow)
2011	June 4	London	2-20 (26)	Louth	0-11 (11)	Croke Park, Dublin	Niall Forde	15	Michael Haverty (Galway)
2010	July 3	Armagh	3-15 (24)	London	3-14 (23)	Croke Park, Dublin	Paul McCormack	1	Declan Magee (Down)
2009	July 11	Meath	2-18 (24)	London	1-15 (18)	Croke Park, Dublin	Neil Hackett	6	Owen Elliott (Antrim)
2008	August 3	Sligo	3-19 (28)	Louth	3-10 (19)	Croke Park, Dublin	Damien Burke	9	Seán Whelan (Wexford)
2007	August 12	Roscommon	1-12 (15)	Armagh	0-13 (13)	Croke Park, Dublin	Mervyn Connaughton	2	Joe Kelly (Wexford)
2006	August 12	Derry	5-15 (30)	Donegal	1-11 (14)	Croke Park, Dublin	Michael Conway	16	Dominic Connolly (Kilkenny)
2005	August 21	London	5-08 (23)	Louth	1-05 (8)	Croke Park, Dublin	Fergus McMahon	15	Tiernach Mahon (Fermanagh)

== Roll of honour ==
=== Performances by county ===
County	Title(s)	Runners-up	Years won	Years runners-up
Donegal	4	2	2013, 2018, 2020, 2024	2006, 2023
Roscommon	3	2	2007, 2015, 2025	2013, 2022
Armagh	2	5	2010, 2012	2007, 2015, 2016, 2017, 2019
London	2	2	2005, 2011	2009, 2010
Mayo	2	3	2016, 2021,	2020, 2024, 2025
Tyrone	2	2	2014, 2022	2021, 2026
Derry	2	0	2006, 2017	—
Sligo	2	0	2008, 2019	—
Meath	1	0	2009	—
New York	1	0	2026	—
Wicklow	1	0	2023	—
Louth	0	4	—	2005, 2008, 2011, 2012
Fingal	0	1	—	2014
Warwickshre	0	1	—	2018

=== Performances by province ===
Division	Titles	Runners-up	Total
Ulster	10	9	19
Connacht	6	4	10
Leinster	2	5	7
Britain	2	3	5
United States	1	0	0
Munster	0	0	0

== Team records and statistics ==
Legend

- 1st – Champions
- 2nd – Runners-up
- SF/QF – Semi-finals/Quarter-finals
- 3rd/4th/5th/GS – Group Stage
- 6th – Relegated
- AI – All-Ireland Senior Hurling Championship
- JM – Joe McDonagh Cup
- CR – Christy Ring Cup
- LM – Lory Meagher Cup

For each year, the number of teams in each championship (in brackets) are shown.

Team	2005 (12)	2006 (12)	2007 (12)	2008 (12)	2009 (8)	2010 (8)	2011 (6)	2012 (6)	2013 (6)	2014 (7)	2015 (8)	2016 (8)	2017 (7)	2018 (7)	2019 (8)	2020 (7)	2021 (5)	2022 (6)	2023 (6)	2024 (6)	2025 (6)	2026 (7)	Years
Armagh	QF	SF	2nd	CR	SF	1st	CR	1st	CR	CR	2nd	2nd	2nd	CR	2nd	R2	SF	4th	3rd	4th	3rd	7th	17
Cavan	GS	GS	GS	QF	LM	LM	—	—	—	—	—	—	LM	LM	LM	LM	LM	LM	LM	LM	LM	LM	4
Derry	CR	1st	CR	CR	CR	CR	CR	CR	CR	CR	CR	CR	1st	CR	CR	CR	CR	CR	CR	CR	CR	CR	2
Donegal	SF	2nd	SF	GS	LM	LM	LM	SF	1st	SF	SF	SF	QF	1st	CR	1st	SF	3rd	2nd	1st	CR	CR	16
Fermanagh	GS	GS	GS	GS	LM	LM	LM	LM	LM	LM	LM	RPO	LM	LM	LM	LM	LM	5th	6th	LM	6th	6th	9
Fingal	—	—	—	SF	SF	QF	SF	—	—	2nd	QF	SF	—	—	—	—	—	—	—	—	—	—	7
Leitrim	GS	GS	GS	QF	LM	LM	LM	LM	LM	LM	LM	LM	LM	RPO	LM	SF	QF	LM	LM	LM	LM	LM	7
London	1st	CR	CR	CR	2nd	2nd	1st	CR	AI	AI	CR	CR	CR	CR	CR	—	—	CR	CR	CR	CR	JM	4
Longford	QF	SF	QF	GS	LM	LM	LM	LM	LM	LM	RPO	QF	QF	GS	GS	R2	LM	LM	LM	LM	LM	LM	10
Louth	2nd	QF	SF	2nd	QF	QF	2nd	2nd	QF	R2	RPO	LM	R2	RPO	RPO	LM	LM	LM	5th	5th	5th	5th	18
Mayo	CR	CR	CR	CR	CR	CR	CR	CR	CR	CR	CR	1st	CR	CR	GS	2nd	1st	CR	CR	2nd	2nd	SF	7
Meath	CR	CR	CR	CR	1st	CR	CR	CR	CR	CR	CR	CR	CR	JM	CR	JM	JM	JM	CR	JM	CR	CR	1
Monaghan	GS	GS	QF	SF	R2	R2	SF	QF	SF	RPO	QF	QF	SF	SF	RPO	R2	LM	LM	LM	6th	LM	LM	17
New York	—	—	—	—	—	—	—	—	—	—	—	—	—	—	—	—	—	—	—	—	LM	1st	1
Roscommon	CR	CR	1st	CR	QF	SF	QF	SF	2nd	SF	1st	CR	CR	CR	CR	CR	CR	2nd	4th	3rd	1st	CR	12
Sligo	GS	QF	GS	1st	R2	SF	QF	QF	QF	RPO	LM	LM	LM	LM	1st	CR	CR	CR	CR	CR	4th	4th	13
South Down	—	—	—	QF	LM	LM	LM	—	—	—	—	—	—	—	—	—	—	—	—	—	—	—	1
Tyrone	SF	GS	QF	QF	LM	R2	LM	LM	SF	1st	SF	RPO	SF	SF	SF	SF	2nd	1st	CR	CR	CR	2nd	16
Warwickshire	GS	GS	QF	GS	LM	LM	LM	LM	LM	LM	LM	LM	LM	2nd	SF	—	—	6th	LM	LM	LM	LM	7
Wicklow	CR	CR	CR	CR	CR	CR	CR	CR	CR	CR	CR	CR	CR	CR	CR	CR	CR	CR	1st	CR	CR	CR	1

=== Debut of teams ===
Year	Debutants	Total
2005	Armagh, Cavan, Donegal, Fermanagh, Leitrim, London, Longford, Louth, Monaghan, Sligo, Tyrone, Warwickshire	12
2006	Derry	1
2007	Roscommon	1
2008	Fingal, South Down	2
2009	Meath	1
2010–2015	None	0
2016	Mayo	1
2017–2022	None	0
2023	Wicklow	1
2024–2025	None	0
2026	New York	1
**Total**		**20**

=== Seasons in Nicky Rackard Cup ===
The number of years that each county has played in the Nicky Rackard Cup between 2005 and 2026. A total of 20 counties have competed in at least one season of the Nicky Rackard Cup. Monaghan have participated in the most championships. The counties in bold participate in the 2026 Nicky Rackard Cup.

Years	Counties
18	**Louth**
17	**Armagh**, Monaghan
16	Donegal, **Tyrone**
13	**Sligo**
12	Roscommon
10	Longford
9	**Fermanagh**
7	Fingal, Leitrim, Warwickshire
7	**Mayo**
4	Cavan, London
2	Derry
1	Meath, **New York**, South Down, Wicklow

=== List of Nicky Rackard Cup counties ===
Team	Appearances	Debut	Most recent	Championship titles	Last championship title	Best Nicky Rackard Cup result
Armagh	17	2005	2026	2	2012	**1st**
Cavan	4	2005	2008	0	—	QF
Derry	2	2006	2017	2	2017	**1st**
Donegal	16	2005	2024	4	2024	**1st**
Fermanagh	9	2005	2026	0	—	5th
Fingal	7	2008	2016	0	—	2nd
Leitrim	7	2005	2021	0	—	SF
London	4	2005	2011	2	2011	**1st**
Longford	10	2005	2020	0	—	SF
Louth	18	2005	2026	0	—	2nd
Mayo	7	2016	2026	2	2021	**1st**
Meath	1	2009		1	2009	**1st**
Monaghan	17	2005	2024	0	—	SF
New York	1	2026		1	2026	**1st**
Roscommon	12	2007	2025	3	2025	**1st**
Sligo	13	2005	2026	2	2019	**1st**
South Down	1	2008		0	—	QF
Tyrone	16	2005	2026	2	2022	**1st**
Warwickshire	7	2005	2022	0	—	2nd
Wicklow	1	2023		1	2023	**1st**

=== All-time table ===
Legend

Colours
Currently competing in the Christy Ring Cup
Currently competing in the Nicky Rackard Cup
Currently competing in the Lory Meagher Cup

As of 11 April 2026. (After 2025 Nicky Rackard Cup).

#	Team	Pld	W	D	L	Points	P.P.G.
1	Donegal	64	43	2	19	**88**	
2	Armagh	74	42	1	31	**85**	
3	Roscommon	50	31	3	16	**65**	
4	Tyrone	57	31	0	26	**62**	
5	Louth	73	28	2	43	**58**	
6	Mayo	33	23	3	7	**49**	
7	Sligo	46	20	3	23	**43**	
8	London	18	15	0	3	**30**	
9	Monaghan	52	13	2	37	**28**	
10	Longford	32	13	0	19	**26**	
11	Fingal	23	11	0	12	**22**	
12	Derry	9	9	0	0	**18**	
13	Warwickshire	25	7	2	16	**16**	
14	Wicklow	6	6	0	0	**12**	
15	Meath	4	4	0	0	**8**	
16	Leitrim	19	3	0	16	**6**	
17	Fermanagh	34	3	2	29	**8**	
18	South Down	3	2	0	1	**4**	
19	New York	2	2	0	0	4	
20	Cavan	10	1	0	9	**2**	

=== By Semi-Final/Top 4 Appearances ===
Team	No.	Years
Donegal	14	2005, **2006**, 2007, 2012, **2013**, 2014, 2015, 2016, **2018**, **2020**, 2021, 2022, **2023**, **2024**
Armagh	14	2006, **2007**, 2009, **2010**, **2012**, **2015**, **2015**, **2017**, **2019**, 2021, 2022, 2023, 2024, 2025
Tyrone	11	2005, 2013, **2014**, 2015, 2017, 2018, 2019, 2020, **2021**, **2022, 2026**
Roscommon	10	**2007**, 2010, 2012, **2013**, 2014, **2015**, **2022**, 2023, 2024, **2025**
Mayo	6	**2016**, **2020**, **2021**, **2024**, **2025,** 2026
Louth	5	**2005**, 2007, **2008**, **2011**, **2012**
Fingal	5	2008, 2009, 2011, **2014**, 2016
Monaghan	5	2008, 2011, 2013, 2017, 2018
Sligo	5	**2008**, 2010, **2019**, 2025, 2026
London	4	**2005**, **2009**, **2010**, **2011**
Derry	2	**2006**, **2017**
Warwickshire	2	**2018**, 2019
Longford	1	2006
Meath	1	**2009**
Leitrim	1	2020
Wicklow	1	**2023**
New York	1	**2026**

=== By decade ===
The most successful team of each decade, judged by number of Nicky Rackard Cup titles, is as follows:

- 2000s: 1 each for London (2005), Derry (2006), Roscommon (2007), Sligo (2008) and Meath (2009)
- 2010s: 2 each for Armagh (2010, 2012) and Donegal (2013, 2018)
- 2020s: 2 for Donegal (2020, 2024)

=== Other records ===
==== Finishing positions ====
- Most championships
  - 4, Donegal (2013, 2018, 2020, 2024)
- Most second-place finishes
  - 5, Armagh (2007, 2015, 2016, 2017, 2019)
- Most third-place finishes
  - 2, Armagh (2023, 2025)
- Most fourth-place finishes
  - 2, Armagh (2022, 2024)
- Most fifth-place finishes
  - 4, Louth (2023, 2024, 2025, 2026)
- Most sixth-place finishes
  - 3, Fermanagh (2023, 2025, 2026)
- Most semi-final finishes
  - 7, Donegal (2005, 2007, 2012, 2014, 2015, 2016, 2021)
  - 7, Tyrone (2005, 2013, 2015, 2017, 2018, 2019, 2020)
- Most quarter-final finishes
  - 4, Longford (2005, 2007, 2016, 2017)
  - 4, Louth (2006, 2009, 2010, 2013)
  - 4, Monaghan (2007, 2012, 2015, 2016)
- Most quarter-final playoff finishes
  - 1, Armagh (2005)
  - 1, Sligo (2006)
- Most group stage finishes
  - 4, Fermanagh (2005, 2006, 2007, 2008)
  - 4, Leitrim (2005, 2006, 2007, 2018)
- Most round 2 finishes
  - 3, Monaghan (2009, 2010, 2020)
- Most qualifier round 2 finishes
  - 1, Louth (2014)
- Most qualifier round 1 finishes
  - 1, Sligo (2014)
  - 1, Monaghan (2014)

==== Nicky Rackard Cup final pairings ====
Pairing	Meetings	First	Last
Armagh v Roscommon	2	2007	2015
Donegal v Mayo	2	2020	2024
London v Louth	2	2005	2011
Armagh v Derry	1	2017	
Armagh v London	1	2010	
Armagh v Louth	1	2012	
Armagh v Mayo	1	2016	
Armagh v Sligo	1	2019	
Derry v Donegal	1	2006	
Donegal v Roscommon	1	2013	
Donegal v Warwickshire	1	2018	
Donegal v Wicklow	1	2023	
Fingal v Tyrone	1	2014	
London v Meath	1	2009	
Louth v Sligo	1	2008	
Mayo v Roscommon	1	2025	
Mayo v Tyrone	1	2021	
New York v Tyrone	1	2026	
Roscommon v Tyrone	1	2022	

== Player records ==
=== Top scorers per championship ===
Season	Top scorer	Team	Score	Total
2016	Damien Casey	Tyrone	2-39	45

=== Top scorer(s) in the final ===
Season	Top scorer	Team	Score	Total
2005	Kevin McMullan	London	2-1	7
2005	Dave Bourke	London	1-4	7
2006	Ruairí Convery	Derry	2-7	13
2007	Shane Sweeney	Roscommon	0-6	6
2008	Keith Raymond	Sligo	1-8	11
2009	Neil Hackett	Meath	0-6	6
2009	Martin Finn	London	0-6	6
2010	Paul Breen	Armagh	2-4	10
2011	Martin Finn	London	2-8	14
2012	Shane Fennell	Louth	0-9	9
2013	Gerry Fallon	Roscommon	2-9	15
2014	John Matthew Sheridan	Fingal	0-11	11
2015	Ryan Gaffney	Armagh	0-8	8
2016	Kenny Feeney	Mayo	1-9	12
2017	A. Grant	Armagh	1-05	8
2018	Niall McKenna	Warwickshire	0-12	12
2018	Declan Coulter	Donegal	1-09	12
2019				
2020	S Boland	Mayo	0-11	11
2021	Damian Casey	Tyrone	0-09	9
2022	D Glynn	Roscommon	0-14	14
2022	Damian Casey	Tyrone	0–14	14
2023	Christy Moorehouse	Wicklow	0–09	9

== See also ==
- All-Ireland Senior Hurling Championship (Tier 1)
- Joe McDonagh Cup (Tier 2)
- Christy Ring Cup (Tier 3)
- Lory Meagher Cup (Tier 5)
