= 2014 Nicky Rackard Cup =

- Dates: 26 April – 7 June 2014
- Teams: 7
- Champions: Tyrone (1st title)
- Runners-up: Fingal

Tournament statistics
- Matches played: 12

The 2014 Nicky Rackard Cup is the tenth staging of the Nicky Rackard Cup hurling championship since its establishment by the Gaelic Athletic Association in 2005. The cup competition began on 26 April 2014 and will end on 14 June 2014.

Donegal were the defending champions, however, they were defeated in the semi-final stages. Tyrone won the title after defeating Fingal by 1-17 to 1-16 in the final. Longford defeated Sligo in the relegation/promotion playoff to earn promotion to the 2015 Nicky Rackard Cup with Sligo dropping down to the Lory Meagher Cup.

== Structure ==
Seven teams compete. Two play in the preliminary round, and five go straight into Round 1.

- The preliminary round winners advance to Round 1. The preliminary round losers go into Qualifier Round 1.
- The Round 1 winners advance to the semi-finals. The Round 1 losers go into Qualifier Round 1.
- There are four teams in Qualifier Round 1. The two winners advance to Qualifier Round 2. The Qualifier Round 1 losers go into a relegation playoff.
- The winners of Qualifier Round 2 advance to the semi-finals.
- There are four semi-finalists — the three Round 1 winners and the Qualifier Round 2 winner.
- The semi-final winners advance to the final.
- The final winners receive the Nicky Rackard Cup and are promoted to the Christy Ring Cup for 2015.
- The Qualifier Round 1 losers play a relegation playoff. The losing team play a promotion/relegation playoff against the bottom-ranked team from the 2014 Lory Meagher Cup (Tier 4).

== Fixtures/results ==
=== Preliminary round ===
26 April 2014 Preliminary round	Roscommon	1-12 - 1-11	Donegal	Athleague GAA Park
14:30	R Fallon (0-8f), R O'Meara (1-0), C Kelly (0-2), S Curley (0-1), D Dolan (0-1).	Report	K Campbell (0-8, 6f), E McDermott (1-2), S McVeigh (0-1).	Referee: J Keane

=== Round 1 ===
3 May 2014 Round 1	Tyrone	1-27 - 2-21	Sligo	O'Neill Park
14:30	D Casey 0-13 (11f), M Mulgrew 1-2, T Morgan 0-3, D Marshall, G Gilmore, C Grogan, A Kelly 0-2 each, S Og Grogan 0-1.	Report	N Hyland 1-1 (1-0f), G O'Kelly-Lynch 1-0, G Cadden 0-8 (5f), K Raymond 0-6 (3f, 1 sideline), G Waldron 0-4, B Kenny, K Gilmartin ('65) 0-1 each.	Referee: C Cunning (Antrim)

3 May 2014 Round 1	Fingal	0-12 - 0-10	Louth	Lawless Memorial Park
14:30	JM Sheridan 0-7 (5fs, 1 ’65′), A Richardson 0-2, D Smyth, D Kelly, C Foley 0-1 each.	Report	P Lynch 0-5 (1f, 1 ’65′), D Murphy 0-3 (1f), D Mahony 0-2.	Referee: P Murphy (Carlow)

3 May 2014 Round 1	Monaghan	0-9 - 2-15	Roscommon	Grattan Park
14:30	K Crawley 0-4 (3f), M Murphy 0-2, C McKenna, B McGuigan and PJ Boyle 0-1 each.	Report	R O'Meara 1-1, R Fallon 0-4 (3f), C Egan 1-0, M Kelly 0-4, S Curley 0-2 (2f), C Dolan 0-2, D Dolan and J Moran 0-1 each.

=== Qualifier round 1 ===
10 May 2013 Qualifier round 1	Louth	4-19 - 0-7	Sligo	St. Brigid's Park
14:30	D Mahony 2-3, D Murphy 0-7 (0-4fs, 1 '65'), S Callan 0-4 (1 sideline), D Kettle, S Maguire 1-0 each, P Lynch 0-2, J Condon, D O'Hanrahan, R Byrne (sideline) 0-1 each.	Report	G Cadden 0-4 (fs), K Gilmartin 0-2, C Brennan 0-1.	Referee: L McAuley (Antrim)

10 May 2013 Qualifier round 1	Donegal	3-26 - 0-15	Monaghan	O'Donnell Park
14:30	S McVeigh (1-4), C Mathewson (1-3), D Cullen (1-4), K Campbell (0-4f), R McDermott (0-3), E McDermott (0-3), J Donnelly (0-1), C McDermott (0-1), P Sheridan (0-1), P Hannigan (0-1), E Organ (0-1).	Report	C Boyle (0-11, 9f, 1'65), E Sweeney (0-1), PJ Boyle (0-1), M Murphy (0-1), B McGuigan (0-1).	Referee: J Clarke

=== Qualifier round 2 ===
17 May 2013 Qualifier round 2	Louth	1-9 - 5-14	Donegal	St. Brigid's Park
14:30	D Murphy (0-8, 7f), D Mahony (1-0), P Lynch (0-1).	Report	C Matthewson (1-7, 0-4f), S McVeigh (2-3), D Cullen (1-2), P Hannigan (1-0), K Campbell (0-1), E Organ (0-1).	Referee: C Cunning

=== Relegation play-off ===
24 May 2014 Relegation play-off	Sligo	0-14 - 3-12	Monaghan	Ballinamore
	K Raymond 0-9 (6f, 1 65'), N Hyland, G Waldron 0-2 each, B Kenny 0-1 (f).	Report	K Crawley 0-7 (6f), B McGuigan 2-1, C McKenna 0-2, C Boyle 1-1, E Mac Suibhne 0-1.	Referee: B Sweeney (Cavan)

=== Semi-finals ===
24 May 2014 Semi-final	Roscommon	0-18 - 2-19	Tyrone	Athleague GAA Park
14:30	R Fallon (0-5, 4f), D Dolan (0-3), G Fallon (0-2), M Kelly (0-2), D Fallon (0-1), S Curley (0-1f), C Dolan (0-1), J Moran (0-1), C Egan (0-1), C Kenny (0-1).	Report	D Casey (0-8, 4f), G Gilmore (1-2), S Og Grogan (1-0), M Winters (0-3), C Grogan (0-3), M Mulgrew (0-2), G Fox (0-1f).	Referee: T Carroll

24 May 2014 Semi-final	Donegal	1-12 - 2-11	Fingal	O'Donnell Park
14:30	E McDermott (1-0), K Campbell (0-3f), C Matthewson (0-3, 2f, 1'65), D Cullen (0-3, 2f), S McVeigh (0-2), R McDermott (0-1).	Report	P Daly (0-7, 6f, 1'65), D Kelly (1-2), D Smyth (1-0), A Richardson (0-1), C Foley (0-1).	Referee: J Clarke

=== Final ===
7 June 2014 Final	Tyrone	1-17 - 1-16	Fingal	Croke Park
14:00	D Casey 0-8 (4f), G Gilmore 0-4, C Cross 1-0, C McNally 0-1, M Winters 0-1, C Grogan 0-1, T Morgan 0-1, M Mulgrew 0-1	Report	J M Sheridan 0-11 (7f, 2 ‘65s), D Smyth 1-2, D Kelly 0-1, D Butterly 0-1, C Foley 0-1.	Referee: D O’Driscoll (Limerick)

=== Promotion play-off ===
14 June 2014 Promotion play-off	Longford	3-17 - 3-13	Sligo	Ballinamore
14:00	J O'Brien (1-9, 0-4f), C Kavanagh (1-4), L Kelly (1-0), K Murray (0-2), M Coyle (0-1), G Moore (0-1)	Report	K Raymond (1-8, 0-5f), K Gilmartin (2-0), G Waldron (0-3), G O'Kelly Lynch (0-1), B Kenny (0-1)	Referee: J Keane

== Championship statistics ==
=== Scoring ===
- Widest winning margin:
- Most goals in a match:
- Most points in a match:
- Most goals by one team in a match:
- Highest aggregate score:
- Lowest aggregate score:
- Most goals scored by a losing team:

== Scoring statistics ==
=== Championship ===
Rank	Player	County	Tally	Total	Matches	Average
1						

=== Single game ===
Rank	Player	County	Tally	Total	Opposition
1	Damian Casey	Tyrone	0-13	13	Sligo
2	Conor Boyle	Monaghan	0-11	11	Donegal
3	Ciarán Matthewson	Donegal	1-7	10	Louth
4	David Mahony	Louth	2-3	9	Sligo
4	Seán McVeigh	Donegal	2-3	9	Louth
4	Keith Raymond	Sligo	0-9	9	Monaghan
7	Kevin Campbell	Donegal	0-8	8	Roscommon
7	Damian Casey	Tyrone	0-8	8	Roscommon
7	Robbie Fallon	Roscommon	0-8	8	Donegal
7	Gary Cadden	Sligo	0-8	8	Tyrone
7	Diarmuid Murphy	Louth	0-8	8	Donegal
