= Roscommon county hurling team =

Hurling team

The Roscommon county hurling team represents Roscommon in hurling and is governed by Roscommon GAA, the county board of the Gaelic Athletic Association. The team competes in the Christy Ring Cup and the National Hurling League. It formerly competed in the abolished Connacht Senior Hurling Championship, finishing as runner-up in the last competition 1999.

Roscommon's home ground is Dr Hyde Park, Roscommon. The team's manager is Seamus Qualter.

The team last won the Connacht Senior Championship in 1913, but has never won the All-Ireland Senior Championship or the National League.

== History ==
Roscommon's sole appearance in an All-Ireland Senior Hurling Championship (SHC) semi-final occurred in 1910. Tipperary defeated the county by a scoreline of 10 goals to one point.

The county defeated Wexford in the 1984 Centenary Cup.

Roscommon won an All-Ireland Senior B Hurling Championship in 1994 and an All-Ireland Intermediate Hurling Championship in 1999.

The county competed in the newly formed Christy Ring Cup in 2005 and 2006 but was relegated to the Nicky Rackard Cup after poor performances.

Roscommon won the 2007 Nicky Rackard Cup Final, defeating Armagh by a scoreline of 1–12 to 0–13. Roscommon won the 2015 Nicky Rackard Cup, again defeating Armagh in the final. Both games occurred at Croke Park.

== Management team ==
Appointed October 2021:

- Manager: Francis O'Halloran (Ruan)
- Backroom: Tommy Guilfoyle (Feakle), Stephen Cusack (Newmarket-on-Fergus)

== Managerial history ==
Michael Conneely Galway 1998–2000

Brian McDonnell 2000

Tom Costello 2001

Brian McDonnell (2) 2002–2003

Anthony Cunningham Galway 2004–2005

Michael Conneely (2) Galway 2005–2006

Dave McConn Athleague 2006–2009

Séamus Qualter Westmeath 2009–2013

Justin Campbell Galway 2013–2016

Johnny Kelly 2016–2017

Ciarán Comerford Laois 2017–2020

Johnny Keane Galway 2020–2021

Francis O'Halloran Clare 2021–

== Players ==
=== Captaincy ===
- 2021: Jason Kilkenny

=== Awards ===
- Champion 15:

denotes that a player also won Player of the Year for the year in question.

2005: Mike Keaveney
2006: Michael Kelly
2008: Micheál Kelly
2016: Micheál Kelly^{2nd? or 3rd?}
2017: Padraig Kelly
2018: Naos Connaughton
2022: Padraig Kelly^{2nd}, Daniel Glynn
2025: Enda Lawless, Mark Ward, Conor Cosgrove , Sean Canning

=== Records ===
- Anthony Flaherty came out of retirement at the age of 49 to play for Roscommon against Meath in the 2006 Christy Ring Cup. Flaherty had not played competitive hurling for eight years ("about 1998") at that time. Flaherty scored a goal against Meath in that game.

== Honours ==
=== National ===
- All-Ireland Senior Hurling Championship
  - (bronze) Semi-finalists (1): 1913
  - Quarter-finalists (1): 1994
- All-Ireland Senior B Hurling Championship
  - (gold) Winners (1): 1994
  - (silver) Runners-up (1): 2003
- All-Ireland Junior Hurling Championship
  - (gold) Winners (3): 1965, 1974, 2001
- Christy Ring Cup
  - (bronze) Semi-finalists (2): 2019, 2020
- Nicky Rackard Cup
  - (gold) Winners (3): 2007, 2015, 2025
  - (silver) Runners-up (2): 2013, 2022
- National Hurling League Division 3
  - (gold) Winners (1): 2007
- National Hurling League Division 3A
  - (gold) Winners (2): 2011, 2019
- All-Ireland Under 21 B Hurling Championship
  - (gold) Winners (2): 2007, 2012
- All-Ireland Minor Special Hurling Championship
  - (gold) Winners (1): 1969

=== Provincial ===
- Connacht Senior Hurling Championship
  - (gold) Winners (2): 1906, 1913
  - (silver) Runners-up (18): 1901, 1902, 1903, 1904, 1907, 1908, 1910, 1911, 1912, 1914, 1916, 1917, 1922, 1995, 1996, 1997, 1998, 1999
- Connacht Senior Hurling League
  - (gold) Winners (1): 2022
  - (silver) Runners-up (1): 2023
- Connacht Intermediate Hurling Championship
  - (gold) Winners (5): 1966, 1967, 1968, 2013, 2015
  - (silver) Runners-up (2): 1997, 1998
- Connacht Junior Hurling Championship
  - (gold) Winners (13): 1952, 1958, 1959, 1960, 1961, 1962, 1963, 1964, 1965, 1966, 1970, 1971, 1974
  - (silver) Runners-up (17): 1925, 1926, 1931, 1937, 1938, 1940, 1946, 1947, 1948, 1949, 1951, 1953, 1955, 1956, 1957, 1969, 1970
- Connacht Under-21 B Hurling Championship
  - (gold) Winners (8): 2007, 2008, 2009, 2010, 2011, 2012, 2013, 2014
- Connacht Minor Hurling Championship
  - (gold) Winners (8): 1959, 1960, 1962, 1963, 1966, 1967, 1968, 1969
