= Louth county hurling team =

Irish hurling team

Louth
- Sport: Hurling
- Irish: Lughbhadh; An Lú
- Nickname(s): The Wee County
- County board: Louth GAA
- Manager: Diarmuid Murphy/Paddy McArdle
- Captain: Conor Clancy
- Home venue(s): St Brigid's Park/Darver Centre of Excellence

Recent competitive record
- Current All-Ireland status: Nicky Rackard Cup (5th in 2025)
- Last championship title: 2022 Lory Meagher Cup
- Current NHL Division: 3 (promoted from Div.4)
- Last league title: 2025 Division 4
First colours

The Louth county hurling team represents Louth in hurling and is governed by Louth GAA, the county board of the Gaelic Athletic Association. The team competes in the Nicky Rackard Cup and the National Hurling League.

Louth's home grounds are St Brigid's Park and Darver Centre of Excellence.

The team has never won the Leinster Senior Championship, the All-Ireland Senior Championship or Division One of the National League.

== History ==
As in most counties outside of the game's heartland of Munster and south Leinster, hurling has been less popular than Gaelic football in Louth. Currently, only three clubs complete in the Louth Senior Hurling Championship. They are Naomh Moninne, Knockbridge and St Fechin's.

At national level, the county's hurlers have won the former All-Ireland Junior Hurling Championship twice and the Lory Meagher Cup three times. They have finished runners-up in the Nicky Rackard Cup competition on four occasions.

In 2024, the team was relegated from Division 3A of the National Hurling League to Division 3B. They retained their status in the fourth-tier Nicky Rackard Cup by finishing fifth in the table.

The 2025 season saw Louth clinch a return to Division 3A of the National Hurling League by winning Division 4. Their Nicky Rackard Cup championship status was also secured with a fifth-place finish in the table.

== Current Panel ==
as per Nicky Rackard Cup round 4, 10 May 2025

No.	Player	Position	Club
1	Conor Clancy (c)	Goalkeeper	St Rynagh's (Offaly)
2	John Casey	Defender	Setanta (Dublin)
3	Conor Quigley	Defender	Knockbridge
4	Stephen Kettle	Defender	Knockbridge
5	Adam Plunkett	Defender	Knockbridge
6	Leon Fox	Defender	Belmont (Offaly)
7	Aaron McGuinness	Defender	Naomh Moninne
8	Ben Goss-Kieran	Midfielder	Knockbridge
9	Conor Murphy	Midfielder	Naomh Moninne
10	Paddy Lynch	Forward	St Fechin's
11	Seán Hodgins	Forward	St Fechin's
12	Peter Fortune	Forward	St Fechin's
13	Darren Geoghegan	Forward	Naomh Moninne

No.	Player	Position	Club
14	Seán Flynn	Forward	Knockbridge
15	Mark Gahan	Forward	Naomh Moninne
16	Dan O'Neill	Goalkeeper	St Fechin's
17	Seaghan Conneely	Forward	St Fechin's
18	Ricky McKeown	Goalkeeper	Knockbridge
19	Jake McNamara	Forward	Knockbridge
20	Thomas McCreesh	Forward	St Fechin's
21	Brian Corcoran	Forward	Knockbridge
22	James Costelloe	Midfielder	Knockbridge
23	Michael O'Shea	Defender	Naomh Moninne
24	James Murphy	Defender	Naomh Moninne
25	David Stephenson	Forward	St Fechin's
26	Seán Magill	Defender	Naomh Moninne

== Managerial history ==
1991 onwards
Year(s)	Name	Origin
1991–95	Tony Melia	Naomh Colmcille
1995–98	Patsy Mulholland	Naomh Moninne
1998	Selection committee	
1999–2001	John Kennedy	
2002–04	Joe Power	
2005	Pat Dunny	
2005	Selection committee	
2006	Kevin McDonnell	Wolfe Tones
2007–09	Pat Clancy	
2010–11	Paddy Kelly	
2012–13	Pat Clancy (2)	
2014–16	Diarmuid McCarthy	Mattock Rangers
2017–18	Philip O'Brien	
2019–23	Paul McCormack	
2024–25	Trevor Hilliard	Knockbridge
2026–	Diarmuid Murphy/Paddy McArdle	Naomh Moninne/

== Honours ==
=== National ===
- National Hurling League Division 3
  - (gold) Winners (6): 1966–67, 1967–1968, 1968–69, 1969-70, 2000, 2008
- National Hurling League Division 3B
  - (gold) Winners (1): 2021
- National Hurling League Division 4
  - (gold) Winners (3): 1984–85, 1993–94, 2025
- All-Ireland Junior Hurling Championship
  - (gold) Winners (2): 1976, 1977
  - (silver) Runners-up (3): 1973, 1975, 1981
- Nicky Rackard Cup
  - (silver) Runners-up (4): 2005, 2008, 2011, 2012
- Lory Meagher Cup
  - (gold) Winners (3): 2016, 2020, 2022

=== Provincial ===
- Leinster Junior Hurling Championship
  - (gold) Winners (3): 1968, 1969, 1973
