= 2005 Nicky Rackard Cup =

- Teams: 12
- Champions: London (1st title)
- Runners-up: Louth

Tournament statistics
- Matches played: 23

The 2005 Nicky Rackard Cup began on Saturday, 18 June 2005. 2005 was the first time the Nicky Rackard Cup was introduced into the All-Ireland Senior Hurling Championship. It was devised by the Hurling Development Committee to encourage some of the so-called "weaker" hurling counties and to give them the chance of playing more games. It is in effect a "Division 3" for hurling teams in Ireland. The final was played on Sunday, 21 August when London beat Louth in the final at Croke Park, Dublin.

== Format ==
Twelve teams participated in the "Nicky Rackard Cup 2005". The teams were divided into three groups of four based on geographical criteria. These groups were:

- Group 3A: Sligo, Tyrone, Donegal and Fermanagh
- Group 3B: Louth, Cavan, Armagh and Leitrim
- Group 3C: London, Warwickshire, Longford and Monaghan

The group winners advance to the semi-finals. The runners-up in Groups 3C and 3B meet in the quarter-final playoff, with the winner meeting the runner-up of Group 3A in the quarter-final.

== Team changes ==
=== To Championship ===
Transferred from the All-Ireland Senior B Hurling Championship and the All-Ireland Junior Hurling Championship

- Armagh
- Cavan
- Donegal
- Fermanagh (Ulster JHC)
- Leitrim
- London (Ulster SHC)
- Longford (Leinster JHC)
- Louth (Leinster JHC)
- Monaghan
- Sligo (Connacht JHC)
- Tyrone
- Warwickshire

== Teams ==
=== General Information ===
County	Last Provincial Title	Last All-Ireland Title	Position in 2004 Championship	Appearance
Armagh	—	—		1st
Cavan	—	—		1st
Donegal	1932	—		1st
Fermanagh	—	—	Runners-up (Ulster Junior Hurling Championship)	1st
Leitrim	—	—		1st
London	—	1901	Quarter-finals (Ulster Senior Hurling Championship)	1st
Longford	—	—	Runners-up (Leinster Junior Hurling Championship)	1st
Louth	—	—	Semi-finals (Leinster Junior Hurling Championship)	1st
Monaghan	1915	—		1st
Sligo	—	—	Runners-up (Connacht Junior Hurling Championship)	1st
Tyrone	—	—		1st
Warwickshire	—	—		1st

== Group stage ==
=== Group A ===
Pos	Team	Pld	W	D	L	SF	SA	Diff	Pts	Qualification
1	Donegal	3	3	0	0	14–43	5–25	45	6	Advance to Semi-Finals
2	Tyrone	3	2	0	1	8–44	10–30	8	4	Advance to Quarter-Final
3	Sligo	3	1	0	2	10–27	10–44	−17	2	
4	Fermanagh	3	0	0	3	5–30	12–45	−36	0	

Date	Team 1	Score	Score	Team 2	Venue
Round 1
18 June	Tyrone	3–17	3–7	Fermanagh	Carrickmore
18 June	Sligo	3–6	5–13	Donegal	Markievicz Park
Round 2
25 June	Donegal	3–12	1–11	Tyrone	O' Donnell Park
25 June	Fermanagh	1–15	3–10	Sligo	Brewster Park
Round 3
9 July	Tyrone	4–16	4–11	Sligo	Carrickmore
9 July	Donegal	6–18	1–8	Fermanagh	O' Donnell Park

=== Group B ===
Pos	Team	Pld	W	D	L	SF	SA	Diff	Pts	Qualification
1	Louth	3	3	0	0	9–51	4–28	38	6	Advance to Semi-Finals
2	Armagh	3	2	0	1	12–42	6–26	34	4	Advance to Quarter-Final playoff
3	Cavan	2	0	0	2	3–13	5–37	−30	0	
4	Leitrim	2	0	0	2	3–21	12–36	−42	0	

Date	Team 1	Score	Score	Team 2	Venue
Round 1
18 June	Armagh	1–16	1–9	Cavan	Crossmaglen
18 June	Louth	3–19	0–15	Leitrim	Drogheda
Round 2
25 June	Cavan	2–4	4–21	Louth	St. Tiernach's Park
25 June	Leitrim	3–6	9–17	Armagh	
Round 3
9 July	Armagh	2–9	2–11	Louth	Keady
9 July	Leitrim	Cancelled		Cavan	–

=== Group C ===
Pos	Team	Pld	W	D	L	SF	SA	Diff	Pts	Qualification
1	London	3	3	0	0	2–64	5–29	26	6	Advance to Semi-Finals
2	Longford	3	2	0	1	6–38	4–36	8	4	Advance to Quarter-Final playoff
3	Monaghan	3	1	0	2	4–36	5–42	−9	2	
4	Warwickshire	3	0	0	3	4–24	2–55	−25	0	

Date	Winner	Score	Score	Runner-up	Venue
Round 1
18 June	Longford	2–12	0–21	London	Michael Fay Park
18 June	Monaghan	0–17	1–11	Warwickshire	Gavin Duffy Park
Round 2
25 June	London	1–20	2–11	Monaghan	Emerald GAA Grounds
25 June	Warwickshire	2–7	1–15	Longford	Páirc na hÉireann
Round 3
9 July	Longford	3–11	2–8	Monaghan	Michael Fay Park
9 July	London	1–23	1–6	Warwickshire	Emerald GAA Grounds

== Knockout stage ==
=== Bracket ===
Quarter-final playoffs
Longford	2–14
Armagh	1–14

Quarter-finals
Tyrone	3–14
Longford	3–13

Semi-finals
London	3–13
Donegal	1–10
Louth	3–10
Tyrone	1–08

Final
London	5–08
Louth	1–05

=== Matches ===
Game	Date	Venue	Winner	Score	Runner-up	Score
Quarter-Final Play off	16 July	Breffni Park, Cavan	Longford	2–14	Armagh	1–14 (AET)
Quarter-Final	24 July	Breffni Park, Cavan	Tyrone	3–14	Longford	3–13
Semi-Final	6 August	Drogheda Park, Drogheda	Louth	3–10	Tyrone	1–8
Semi-Final	7 August	O' Donnell Park, Letterkenny	London	3–13	Donegal	1–10

=== Final ===
21 August 2005 Final	London	5–08 – 1–05	Louth	Croke Park, Dublin

London are promoted to the 2006 Christy Ring Cup.

==== Match details ====
The 2005 Nicky Rackard Cup final was used as a curtain raiser for the semi-final of the 2005 Liam MacCarthy Cup. London won the game by a margin of 15 points.

At half time, thanks to two goals in the space of a minute from Barry Shortall and Kevin McMullan, London led by 2–04 to 0–05. Ten minutes into the second half, London re-opened the scoring for a 2–05 to 0–05 lead. Louth subsequently scored what would be their only goal – and only score of the second half. On 57 minutes, McMullan scored a further goal for London. Four minutes later, Sean Quinn kicked in London's fourth goal. Corner forward Dave Burke subsequently scored a fifth on 67 minutes. Burke clipped over a 65 and Gary Fenton added another point for London before the final whistle.

London: JJ Burke; E Phelan, T Simms, B Forde; J Dillon, F McMahon, B Foley 0–1; M Harding 0–01 (1f), M O'Meara; D Smyth, J Ryan, J McGaughan; D Bourke 1-04 (3f), B Shortall 1-00, K McMullan 2-01.

Subs: E Kinlon (for Smyth 36 mins), G Fenton 0-01 (for O'Meara 36 mins), S Quinn 1-00 (for Shortall 55 mins), P Doyle (for Phelan 68 mins), P Finneran (for McMullan 70 mins).

Louth: S Smith; D Black, A Carter, S Darcy; R Byrne, P Dunne, D Mulholland; D McCarthy, S Callan 0-02; T Hilliard, J Carter, D Byrne; G Smith 1-01 (1f), D Dunne 0-01, N McEneaney 0-01.

Subs: G Collins (for R Byrne h/t), S Byrne (for J Carter 53 mins), A Mynes (for McEneaney 65 mins), N Byrne (for Darcy 71 mins).

Referee: T Mahon (Fermanagh).

== Stadia and locations ==
County	Location	Province	Stadium(s)	Capacity
Neutral	Dublin	Leinster	Croke Park (neutral)	82,300
Armagh	Armagh	Ulster	Athletic Grounds	18,500
Cavan	Cavan	Ulster	Breffni Park	32,000
Donegal	Ballybofey	Ulster	MacCumhaill Park	18,000
Fermanagh	Enniskillen	Ulster	Brewster Park	18,000
Leitrim	Carrick-on-Shannon	Connacht	Páirc Seán Mac Diarmada	9,331
London	South Ruislip	Britain	McGovern Park	3,000
Longford	Longford	Leinster	Pearse Park	6,000
Louth	Drogheda	Leinster	Drogheda Park	3,500
Monaghan	Clones	Ulster	St Tiernach's Park	36,000
Sligo	Sligo	Connacht	Markievicz Park	18,558
Tyrone	Omagh	Ulster	Healy Park	17,636
Warwickshire	Solihull	Britain	Páirc na hÉireann	4,500

== Statistics ==
=== Scoring events ===
- Widest winning margin: 29 points
  - Leitrim 3-06 – 9–17 Armagh (Round 2)
- Most goals in a match: 12
  - Leitrim 3-06 – 9–17 Armagh (Round 2)
- Most points in a match: 34
  - Louth 3–19 – 0–15 Leitrim (Round 1)
- Most goals by one team in a match: 9
  - Leitrim 3-06 – 9–17 Armagh (Round 2)
- Most points by one team in a match: 23
  - London 1–23 – 1-06 Warwickshire (Round 3)
- Highest aggregate score: 59 points
  - Leitrim 3-06 – 9–17 Armagh (Round 2)
- Lowest aggregate score: 30 points
  - Louth 3–10 – 1-08 Tyrone (Semi-finals)

== Miscellaneous ==
- London won their 1st championship in 10 years, last winning the 1995 All-Ireland Senior B Hurling Championship.

== See also ==
- 2005 All-Ireland Senior Hurling Championship
- 2005 Christy Ring Cup
