= 2012 Nicky Rackard Cup =

- Counties coloured by 2012 Championship tier; Nicky Rackard Cup counties in green.
- Dates: 5 May – 9 June 2012
- Teams: 6
- Champions: Armagh
- Runners-up: Louth

Tournament statistics
- Matches played: 8
- Goals scored: 19 (2.38 per match)
- Points scored: 224 (28 per match)

The 2012 Nicky Rackard Cup is the eighth season of the Nicky Rackard Cup since its establishment in 2005. A total of six teams will contest the Nicky Rackard Cup, including four sides from the 2011 Nicky Rackard Cup and one promoted team from the 2011 Lory Meagher Cup and one team relegated from the 2011 Christy Ring Cup. The teams are:

- Monaghan
- Roscommon
- Sligo
- Louth
- Armagh *Relegated from 2011 Christy Ring Cup
- Donegal *Promoted from 2011 Lory Meagher Cup

== Structure ==
The tournament has a double elimination format - each team will play at least two games before being knocked out.

- There are two Round 1 matches.
  - The winners in Round 1 advance to Round 2.
  - The losers in Round 1 go into the quarter-finals.
- There are two Round 2 matches.
  - The winners in Round 2 advance to the semifinals.
  - The losers in Round 2 go into the quarter-finals.
- There are two quarter-final matches between the Round 1 losers and Round 2 winners.
  - The winners of the quarter-finals advance to the semifinals.
  - The losers of the quarter-finals are eliminated.
- There are two semifinal matches, between the Round 2 winners and the quarter-final winners.
  - The winners of the semifinals advance to the final.
  - The losers of the semifinals are eliminated.
- The winners of the final win the Nicky Rackard Cup for 2012 and are promoted to the Christy Ring Cup for 2013.

== Results ==
Round 1
Donegal	1-15
Roscommon	0-14
Armagh	1-20
Louth	1-08

Round 2 Quarter-finals
Donegal	1-15
Monaghan	0-15
Sligo	1-09
Louth	3-15
Roscommon	2-19
Monaghan	1-11
Sligo	0-08
Armagh	1-20

Semi-finals
Donegal	0-07
Louth	3-18
Rocommon	1-17
Armagh	4-12

Final
Louth	1-15
Armagh	3-20

=== Round 1 ===
5 May 2012

Louth	1-08 - 0-20	Armagh
S Fennell 0-3 (2f), A Wallace 1-0, B Corcoran 0-2, G Rellis, S Callan, R Byrne (1 '65') 0-1 each	Report	D Carvill 0-9 (7f), R Lewis 0-4, R McGrattan, P McCormack (1f) 0-2 each, J King, R Gaffney, C Corvan 0-1 each

Dowdallshill, Drogheda
Referee: P O'Dwyer

5 May 2012

Donegal	1-15 - 0-14	Roscommon
N Campbell 0-7 (4f, 2 '65'), E McDermott 0-4, R McDermott 1-0, L Henderson, D Cullen 0-2 each.	Report	D Dolan 0-10 (9f), M Kelly, P Kelly, D Nolan, J Lawlor 0-1 each.

Letterkenny
Referee: E Hassan

=== Round 2 ===
12 May 2012

Monaghan	0-15 - 1-16	Donegal
S Lambe 0-9 (7f), T Hilliard, E MacSuibhne 0-2 each, C McKenna and M Treanor 0-1 each	Report	L Henderson 0-8 (4f), N Campbell 1-4 (1-0pen, 4f), D Cullen 0-2, P Doherty, E Organ 0-1 each

Clones
Referee: D McGee

12 May 2012

Armagh	1-20 - 0-08	Sligo
D Carvill 0-6 (2 '65s'), D Coulter 0-4, C Carvill, C Corvan 0-3 each, J King 1-0, C Coulter 0-2, R Lewis 0-1	Report	G Waldron 0-6 (2 '45s'), A Cawley, K Raymond 0-1 each.

Crossmaglen
Referee: L McAuley

=== Quarter-finals ===
19 May 2012

Sligo	1-09 - 3-15	Louth
	Report

Markievicz Park, Sligo
Referee: E Hassan

19 May 2012

Roscommon	2-19 - 1-11	Monaghan
	Report

Athleague
Referee: T Ryan

=== Semifinals ===
26 May 2012

Armagh	4-12 - 1-17	Roscommon
D Carvill 0-6, C Corvan 2-0, F Bradley, M Maguire 1-0 each, D Coulter, J Corvan 0-2 each, P McCormack, C Carvill 0-1 each	Report	J Coyne 1-4, G Fallon, B Donnelly, D Nolan, M Kelly 0-2 each, D Dolan, K Egan, E Mulry, B Kelly, S Curley 0-1 each

Crossmaglen
Referee: E Hassan

26 May 2012

Donegal	0-07 - 3-18	Louth
N Campbell 0-2 (1f), S McVeigh, E McDermott, D Cullen, R McDermott, E Organ 0-1 each	Report	S Fennell 1-5 (5f), D Dunne 2-0, D Murphy 0-5 (1f), A Wallace 0-2, D O'Sullivan, R Byrne, D Horan, S Callan, B Corcoran, G Smyth 0-1 each

Letterkenny
Referee: O Elliot

=== Final ===
9 June 2012

Armagh	3-20 - 1-15	Louth
Coulter (2-2), D. Carvill (0-6, 5f), C. Corvan (1-3), R. Gaffney, McCormack, J. Corvan (0-2 each), McGrattan, Bradley, C. Carvill (0-1 each)		Fennell (0-9, 7f, 1'65), Corcoran (1-2), O'Sullivan, Callan, Murphy, A. Wallace (0-1 each)

Croke Park, Dublin
Referee: P. O'Dwyer (Carlow)

GK	1	Simon Doherty (Naomh Eoin, Antrim)
RCB	2	Pauric Hughes (Middletown)
FB	3	Ciarán Clifford (Cúchulainn's)
LCB	4	Conor McKee (Keady Lámh Dhearg)
RHB	5	Kieran McKernan (Middletown)
CHB	6	Nathan Curry (Middletown)
LHB	7	Paul Gaffney (Middletown)
MF	8	Ruairí McGrattan (Cúchulainn's)
MF	9	James King (Keady Lámh Dhearg)
RHF	10	David Carvill (Middletown)
CHF	11	Cahal Carvill (Middletown)
LHF	12	Ryan Gaffney (Middletown) (c)
RCF	13	Declan Coulter (Cúchulainn's)
FF	14	Paul McCormack (Keady Lámh Dhearg)
LCF	15	Conor Corvan (Keady Lámh Dhearg)
Substitutes:
	16	Fiachra Bradley (Craobh Rua) for Coulter
	17	John Corvan (Keady Lámh Dhearg) for D. Carvill
	18	Martin Maguire (Middletown) for King
	19	Anthony Carville (Seán Treacy's) for C. Corvan
Manager:
Michael Johnston

GK	1	James Connolly (Naomh Moninne)
RCB	2	Donal Rafferty (Naomh Moninne)
FB	3	Wesley Morrissey (Patrickswell, Limerick)
LCB	4	Mark Wallace (Knockbridge)
RHB	5	Donagh O'Sullivan (Knockaderry, Limerick)
CHB	6	Ronan Byrne (Knockbridge)
LHB	7	Derek Horan (Shannon Rovers, Tipperary)
MF	8	Shane Callan (Pearse Óg) (c)
MF	9	Darren O'Hanrahan (Naomh Moninne)
RHF	10	Brian Corcoran (Mattock Rangers)
CHF	11	Shane Fennell (Knockbridge)
LHF	12	Diarmuid Murphy (Naomh Moninne)
RCF	13	Kevin McNally (Knockbridge)
FF	14	David Dunne (Knockbridge)
LCF	15	Adrian Wallace (Knockbridge)
Substitutes:
	16	Gary Rellis (Mattock Rangers) for O'Hanrahan
	17	Gerard Smyth (Pearse Óg) for McNally
	18	Domhnall McArdle (Pearse Óg) for M. Wallace
	19	Shane Maguire (Mattock Rangers) for Murphy
Manager:
Pat Clancy

== Scoring ==
- Widest winning margin: 20 points
  - Louth 3-18 - 0-07 Donegal (Semifinal)
- Most goals in a match: 5
  - Armagh 4-12 - 1-17 Roscommon (Semifinal)
- Most points in a match: 31
  - Monaghan 0-15 - 1-16 Donegal (Round 2)
- Most goals by one team in a match: 4
  - Armagh 4-12 - 1-17 Roscommon (Semifinal)
- Most goals scored by a losing team: 1
  - Armagh 4-12 - 1-17 Roscommon (Semifinal)
  - Roscommon 2-19 - 1-11 Monaghan (Quarter-final)
  - Louth 3-15 - 1-09 Sligo (Quarter-final)
  - Armagh 0-20 - 1-08 Louth (Round 1)
- Most points scored by a losing team: 17
  - Armagh 4-12 - 1-17 Roscommon (Semifinal)
