= 2024 Lory Meagher Cup =

Hurling competition

- Dates: 13 April - 2 June 2024
- Teams: 6
- Champions: Fermanagh (3rd title); Ryan Bogue (captain); Joe Baldwin (manager)
- Runners-up: Longford; Johnny Casey (captain); Adrian Moran (manager)

Tournament statistics
- Matches played: 16
- Goals scored: 60 (3.75 per match)
- Points scored: 610 (38.13 per match)
- Top scorer(s): Cian Darcy (3-67)

The 2024 Lory Meagher Cup was the sixteenth edition of the Lory Meagher Cup since its establishment by the Gaelic Athletic Association in 2009 and is the fifth-tier of Hurling for senior county teams (the All-Ireland Senior Hurling Championship is the first-tier trophy). It is contested by six GAA county teams ranked 30–35 in the 2024 All-Ireland Senior Hurling Championship. The competition ran from 13 April to 2 June 2024.

The Lory Meagher Cup final was played on 2 June 2024 at Croke Park in Dublin, between Fermanagh and Longford, in what was their second meeting in the final overall and a first meeting in 10 years. Fermanagh won the match by 3–22 to 2–20 to claim their third cup title overall and a first title in three years.

Longford's Cian Darcy was the top scorer with 3-67.

== Team changes ==
=== To Championship ===
Relegated from the Nicky Rackard Cup

- Fermanagh

=== From Championship ===
Promoted to the Nicky Rackard Cup

- Monaghan

== Teams ==
=== General Information ===
County	Last Cup Title	Last Provincial Title	Last All-Ireland Title	Position in 2023 Championship	Appearance
Cavan	—	—	—	3rd	10th
Fermanagh	2021	—	—	6th (Nicky Rackard Cup)	13th
Lancashire	—	—	—	Runners-up	8th
Leitrim	2019	—	—	5th	13th
Longford	2014	—	—	4th	10th
Warwickshire	2017	—	—	6th	11th

=== Personnel and kits ===
County	Manager	Captain(s)	Sponsor
Cavan			
Fermanagh	Joe Baldwin		
Lancashire			
Leitrim			
Longford			
Warwickshire			

== Group Stage ==
=== Table ===
Pos	Team	Pld	W	D	L	SF	SA	Diff	Pts	Qualification
1	Fermanagh	5	3	2	0	135	94	+41	8	Advance to Knockout Stage
2	Longford (Note: Longford are ranked ahead of Cavan because they won the head-to-head game between the teams.)	5	3	1	1	130	104	+26	7	Advance to Knockout Stage
3	Cavan	5	3	1	1	145	111	+34	7	
4	Leitrim	5	2	0	3	111	126	-15	4	
5	Warwickshire	5	2	0	3	100	144	-44	4	
6	Lancashire	5	0	0	5	104	146	-42	0	

=== Round 1 ===
13 April 2024 Round 1	Longford	2-22 - 0-10	Lancashire	Glennon Brothers Pearse Park
	C Darcy 1-11, D Buckley 1-2, C Mullane 0-4, S Lancaster 0-2, M O'Donohoe 0-1, R Murray 0-1, M Mulcahy 0-1.	Report	D Lynch 0-5, E Clifford 0-2, C Convery 0-1, E Costello 0-1, J McFayden 0-1.

13 April 2024 Round 1	Leitrim	1-09 - 0-19	Fermanagh	Avant Money Pairc Sean Mac Diarmada
	J Murray (2f) & G O’Hagan (2f) 0-4 each; S Goldrick 1-0; C Hackett 0-1	Report	D Teague (f) & B Teehan 0-3 each; C Duffy, S Corrigan & JP McGarry 0-2 each; A Flanagan, R Bogue (f), L McCusker, J Duffy (f), T Keenan, O Johnston & D McKeogh 0-1 each

13 April 2024 Round 1	Cavan	1-22 - 2-13	Warwickshire	Kingspan Breffni Park
	N Kenny (1-11, 7f, two 65s), S Keating (0-5), M Moffett (0-2); L O'Brien (0-1, f), T Leonard (0-1), J Barry (0-1), M Moffett (0-1).	Report	J Grealish (1-3), L Hands (1-1), D Devine (0-2); J Conway (0-2, 1f), I Dwyer (0-2); K McKernan (0-2), K Magee (0-1).

=== Round 2 ===
20 April 2024 Round 2	Fermanagh	5-12 - 3-18	Cavan	Brewster Park
	D McKeogh (1-5, 4f); J Duffy (2-0); S Corrigan (0-4), A McShea (1-0), Caolan Duffy (1-0), R Bogue (0-1), JP McGarry (0-1), J Tormey (0-1).	Report	N Kenny (0-8, 6f), M Moffett (1-2); S Keating (1-2), J Barry (1-1), C Sheanon (0-3); D Mulligan (0-1), L O’Brien (0-1, 1f).

20 April 2024 Round 2	Lancashire	1-20 - 2-25	Leitrim	Glenavy Grounds
	C Levingstone 1–2; P Boylan 0–4; E Kelly 0–3; C Convery, D Lynch 65, E Clifford f, & A Gallagher 0–2 each; S Nugent, A Morgan & A McKinley 0–1 each.	Report	G O'Hagan 1–9 pen 5f; J Murray 1–4; M Feeney 0–5; S Markham 0- 3 65 f; S Goldrick 0–2; P Burgess & C Hackett 0–1 each.

21 April 2024 Round 2	Warwickshire	2-21 - 2-16	Longford	Páirc na hÉireann
	Conway (0-11, 4 frees), J Grealish (1-1), L Hands (1-1), McKernan (0-4, 3 frees), Dwyer (0-1); Lowry (0-1), P Hands (0-1), Devine (0-1).	Report	C Darcy (0-8, 5 frees, 1 ’65), C Mullane (1-1), O Gately (1-1), P Lynam (0-3), D Buckley (0-3).

=== Round 3 ===
27 April 2024 Round 3	Lancashire	0-21 - 2-25	Cavan	Glenavy Grounds
	E Clifford 0-6 (3f); D Lynch 0-4 (2f, ‘65); P Boylan 0-3; C Levingstone, A Gallagher 0-2 each; E Kelly, E Kearns, C Convery, C Kenny 0-1 each.	Report	N Kenny 0-10 (5f); L O’ Brien 0-5 (3f); S Keating 0-4; D Mulligan, C Maher 1-0 each; J Barry 0-2; T Leonard, M Moffett, L Óg Cooke, B Fitzgerald 0-1 each.

27 April 2024 Round 3	Longford	2-22 - 3-09	Leitrim	Glennon Brothers Pearse Park
	C Darcy 1-09 (2fs), J Rabbitt 1-01, D Buckley 0-3, E Tully, C Mullane, O Gately 0-02 each, A Quinn, P Lynam, R Murray 0-1 each.	Report	J McNabola 2-00, G O’Hagan 0-04 (4fs), S Goldrick 1-00, J Murray 0-02 (1f), C Cunniffe (f), G O’Brien, P Burgess 0-01 each.

28 April 2024 Round 3	Warwickshire	0-08 - 3-27	Fermanagh	Páirc na hÉireann
	J Conway 0-5, J Grealish 02-, D Devine 0-1.	Report	D McKeogh 1-9, S Corrigan 1-7, B Teehan 1-3, L McCusker 0-2, T Keenan 0-2, J Tormey 0-1, J Duffy 0-1, R Bogue 0-1, T Duane 0-1.

=== Round 4 ===
11 May 2024 Round 4	Leitrim	2-25 - 0-16	Warwickshire	Shane McGettigan Memorial Park
	J Murray 1-13 (6f); B Delaney 1-0; G O’Hagan 0-2; P Poniard, S Markham 0-1 each.	Report	J Collins 1-2 (1f); Oisín Coffey 1-1; L Hands (3f); P Crehan 0-3 each; E McWilliams 0-2; K Murphy, N Eames, D King, A Hands 0-1 each.

11 May 2024 Round 4	Fermanagh	1-23 - 0-20	Lancashire	Brewster Park
	S Corrigan 0-9, D McKeogh 0-9 (5f, 1’65), B Teehan 1-2, L McCusker 0-2, J Duffy 0-1. Lancashire:	Report	E Clifford 0-9 (3f), C Convery 0-3, D Lynch 0-2, P Boylan 0-2, S Parsons 0-1, J Patton 0-1, S Nugent 0-1, F Henry 0-1

11 May 2024 Round 4	Cavan	1-19 - 0-25	Longford	Kingspan Breffni Park
	L O’Brien (0-6, 4f, ’65); N Kenny (0-4); C Sheanon (1-0); S Keating (0-3); C Maher (0-2); T Leonard, J Barry, D Mulligan, B Fitzgerald, (0-1) each.	Report	C Darcy (0-16, 15f); R Murray (0-3); D Buckley (0-2); K Murray, O Gately, P Lynham, J Rabbitt (0-1) each

=== Round 5 ===
18 May 2024 Round 5	Lancashire	2-24 - 6-22	Warwickshire	Páirc na hÉireann
		Report

18 May 2024 Round 5	Longford	3-18 - 2-21	Fermanagh	Glennon Brothers Pearse Park
	C Darcy (1-10, 4 frees, 1 ‘65’), D Buckley (1-2), R Courtney (1-0), Oisin Gately (0-2), J Rabbitt (0-1); R Murray (0-1), C Mullane (0-1); P Lynam (0-1).	Report	S Corrigan (0-5), D McKeogh (0-5, 1 free, 1 ‘65), C McManus (1-0), T Keenan (1-0), C Duffy (0-3), D Teague (0-2), B Teehan (0-2), L McCusker (0-2), J Tormey (0-1); JP McGarry (0-1).

18 May 2024 Round 5	Leitrim	0-18 - 7-19	Cavan	Shane McGettigan Memorial Park
	J Murray 0-8, 4f; G O’Hagan 0-5, 4f; C Beirne, S Markham, P Lenehan, G O’Brien & D McGovern 0-1 each	Report	L O’Brien 0-8, 5f; N Kenny 2-2; C Maher 1-3; B Fitzgerald 2-0; S Keating 1-2; C Sheanon 1-1; T Leonard 0-2; D Carney 0-1

== Knockout stage ==
=== Final ===
2 June 2024 Final	Fermanagh	3-17 - 0-22	Longford	Croke Park
	B Teehan 2-2; D McKeogh 1-4.2f; S Corrigan 0-4; L McCusker 0-31f; T Keenan 0-3; J Duffy 0-2; C Duffy, C Duffy, JP McGarry and A Flanagan 0-1, each;	Report	C Darcy 0-13,12f; J Rabbitt 1-1; D Buckley 1-1; E Tully 0-2; C Mullane 0-2; P Lynam 0-1;	Referee: J Judge (Mayo)

== Statistics ==
=== Top scorers ===
Overall

Rank	Player	County	Tally	Total	Matches	Average
1	Cian Darcy	Longford	3-67	76	6	12.66
2	Nicholas Kenny	Cavan	3-35	44	5	8.80
3	Danann McKeogh	Fermanagh	3-33	42	6	7.00
4	Seán Corrigan	Fermanagh	1-31	34	6	5.66
5	Gavin O'Hagan	Leitrim	1-24	27	5	5.40

== Miscellaneous ==
- Fermanagh won their 1st championship in 3 years, last winning the 2021 Lory Meagher Cup.

== See also ==
- 2024 All-Ireland Senior Hurling Championship (Tier 1)
- 2024 Leinster Senior Hurling Championship
- 2024 Munster Senior Hurling Championship
- 2024 Joe McDonagh Cup (Tier 2)
- 2024 Christy Ring Cup (Tier 3)
- 2024 Nicky Rackard Cup (Tier 4)
