= 2026 Lory Meagher Cup =

Hurling tournament in Ireland

- Corn Labhraí Uí Mheachair

Tournament details
- Level: 5
- Year: 2026
- Trophy: Lory Meagher Cup
- Dates: 12 April - 31 May 2026
- Teams: 6

Winners
- Champions: Longford (3rd win)
- Manager: Diarmuid Chaill
- Captain: Reuben Murray
- Qualify for: Lory Meagher Cup Final

Runners-up
- Runners-up: Leitrim
- Manager: Mike Wall
- Captain: Joe Murray

Promotion/Relegation
- Promoted team(s): Longford

The 2026 Lory Meagher Cup was the seventeenth edition of the Lory Meagher Cup since its establishment by the Gaelic Athletic Association in 2009 and is the fifth-tier of Hurling for senior county teams (the All-Ireland Senior Hurling Championship is the first-tier trophy). It is contested by six GAA county teams ranked 31–36 in the 2026 All-Ireland Senior Hurling Championship. The competition runs from 12 April to 31 May 2026.

New York, winner of the 2025 final, were promoted to the Nicky Rackard Cup, with no team being relegated from the Nicky Rackard Cup.

The top 2 teams from the round robin stage will play off in the final to decide the winner.

== Team changes ==
=== From Championship ===
Promoted to the Nicky Rackard Cup

- New York

=== Cup format ===
Initially each of the six teams will play the other five teams in single round-robin matches. The top two teams after the round robin games will compete in the Lory Meagher Cup Final.

==== Promotion ====
The Lory Meagher Cup champions are automatically promoted to the following year's Nicky Rackard Cup and are replaced by the bottom-placed team in the Nicky Rackard Cup.

=== Teams by Province ===
The participating teams, listed by province, with numbers in parentheses indicating final positions in the 2026 National Hurling League before the championship were:

Britain (2)

- Lancashire (35)
- Warwickshire (33)

Connacht (1)

- Leitrim (31)

Leinster (1)

- Longford (30)

Munster (0)

- None participated

Ulster (2)

- Cavan (32)
- Monaghan (34)

== Teams ==
=== General Information ===
| County | Last Cup Title | Last Provincial Title | Last All-Ireland Title | Position in 2025 Championship | Appearance |
|---|---|---|---|---|---|
| Cavan | — | — | — | Runners-Up | 12th |
| Lancashire | — | — | — | 5th | 10th |
| Leitrim | 2019 | — | — | 4th | 15th |
| Longford | 2014 | — | — | 3rd | 12th |
| Monaghan | 2023 | 1915 | — | Semi-Final | 5th |
| Warwickshire | 2017 | — | — | 6th | 13th |

=== Personnel and kits ===
| County | Manager | Captain(s) | Sponsor |
|---|---|---|---|
| Cavan | Ollie Bellew | Enda Shalvey | Kingspan |
| Lancashire | Liam Óg Knocker | | R&M Developments |
| Leitrim | Mike Wall | Joe Murray | Gallagher Group |
| Longford | Diarmuid Cahill | Reuben Murray | Glennon Brothers |
| Monaghan | Arthur Hughes | Ethan Flynn and Niall Garland | Activ8 Energies |
| Warwickshire | Jamie Lynch | | HireSafe Solutions |

== Group Stage ==
=== Table ===
| Pos | Team | Pld | W | D | L | SF | SA | Diff | Pts | Qualification |
|---|---|---|---|---|---|---|---|---|---|---|
| 1 | Leitrim | 5 | 5 | 0 | 0 | 7-99 | 8-68 | +28 | 10 | Advance to Final |
| 2 | Longford | 5 | 4 | 0 | 1 | 17-95 | 7-66 | +59 | 8 | Advance to Final |
| 3 | Monaghan | 5 | 2 | 0 | 3 | 6-89 | 10-75 | +2 | 4 | |
| 4 | Warwickshire | 5 | 2 | 0 | 3 | 13-77 | 12-84 | -4 | 4 | |
| 5 | Cavan | 5 | 2 | 0 | 3 | 9-76 | 9-93 | -17 | 4 | |
| 6 | Lancashire | 5 | 0 | 0 | 5 | 10-61 | 16-111 | -68 | 0 | |

=== Round 1 ===
| 11 April 2026 Round 1 | Cavan | 3-14 (23) - (15) 0-15 | Warwickshire | Cavan |
| 13:00 | | | | Stadium: Kingspan Breffni; Referee: Conor Daly |

| 11 April 2026 Round 1 | Longford | 5-21 (36) - (9) 1-06 | Lancashire | Longford |
| 13:00 | | | | Stadium: Glennon Brothers Pearse Park; Referee: Ciarán O'Donovan |

| 11 April 2026 Round 1 | Leitrim | 2-13 (19) - (15) 2-09 | Monaghan | Carrick-on-Shannon |
| 15:00 | | | | Stadium: Heartland Credit Union Páirc Seán MacDiarmada; Referee: Aiden Aleer |

=== Round 2 ===
| 18 April 2026 Round 2 | Lancashire | 2-15 (21) - (32) 2-26 | Leitrim | Birmingham |
| 12:00 | | | | Stadium: Páirc na hÉireann |

| 19 April 2026 Round 2 | Monaghan | 3-22 (31) - (18) 1-15 | Cavan | Clones |
| 13:00 | | | | Stadium: St Tiernach's Park |

| 19 April 2026 Round 2 | Warwickshire | 3-12 (21) - (36) 4-24 | Longford | Birmingham |
| 14:00 | | | | Stadium: Páirc na hÉireann; Referee: Seaghan Walsh |

=== Round 3 ===
| 26 April 2026 Round 3 | Lancashire | 2-15 (21) - (25) 3-16 | Cavan | Birmingham |
| 12:00 | | | | Stadium: Páirc na hÉireann |

| 26 April 2026 Round 3 | Leitrim | 1-19 (22) - (19) 1-16 | Longford | Carrick-on-Shannon |
| 14:00 | | | | Stadium: Heartland Credit Union Páirc Seán MacDiarmada |

| 26 April 2026 Round 3 | Warwickshire | 2-18 (24) - (16) 0-16 | Monaghan | Birmingham |
| 14:00 | | | | Stadium: Páirc na hÉireann |

=== Round 4 ===
| 9 May 2026 Round 4 | Cavan | 1-15 (18) - (27) 3-18 | Longford | Cavan |
| 14:00 | | | | Stadium: Kingspan Breffni |

| 9 May 2026 Round 4 | Monaghan | 0-28 (28) - (16) 1-13 | Lancashire | Inniskeen |
| 13:00 |

| 9 May 2026 Round 4 | Leitrim | 1-18 (21) - (18) 2-12 | Warwickshire | Carrick-on-Shannon |
| 14:00 | | | | Stadium: Heartland Credit Union Páirc Seán MacDiarmada |

=== Round 5 ===
| 16 May 2026 Round 5 | Lancashire | 4-12 (24) - (38) 6-20 | Warwickshire | Birmingham |
| 14:00 | | | | Stadium: Páirc na hÉireann |

| 16 May 2026 Round 5 | Leitrim | 1-23 (26) - (19) 1-16 | Cavan | Carrick-on-Shannon |
| 14:00 | | | | Stadium: Heartland Credit Union Páirc Seán MacDiarmada |

| 16 May 2026 Round 5 | Longford | 4-16 (28) - (17) 1-14 | Monaghan | Longford |
| TBC | | | | Stadium: Glennon Brothers Pearse Park |

== Knockout stage ==
=== Final ===
| 31 May 2026 Final | Leitrim | 1-13 (16) – (21) 1-18 | Longford | Dublin |
| 12:30 | | (HT: 0-10 - 0-08) | | Venue: Croke Park |
| | | | | TV: Spórt TG4 |

== Stadia and Locations ==
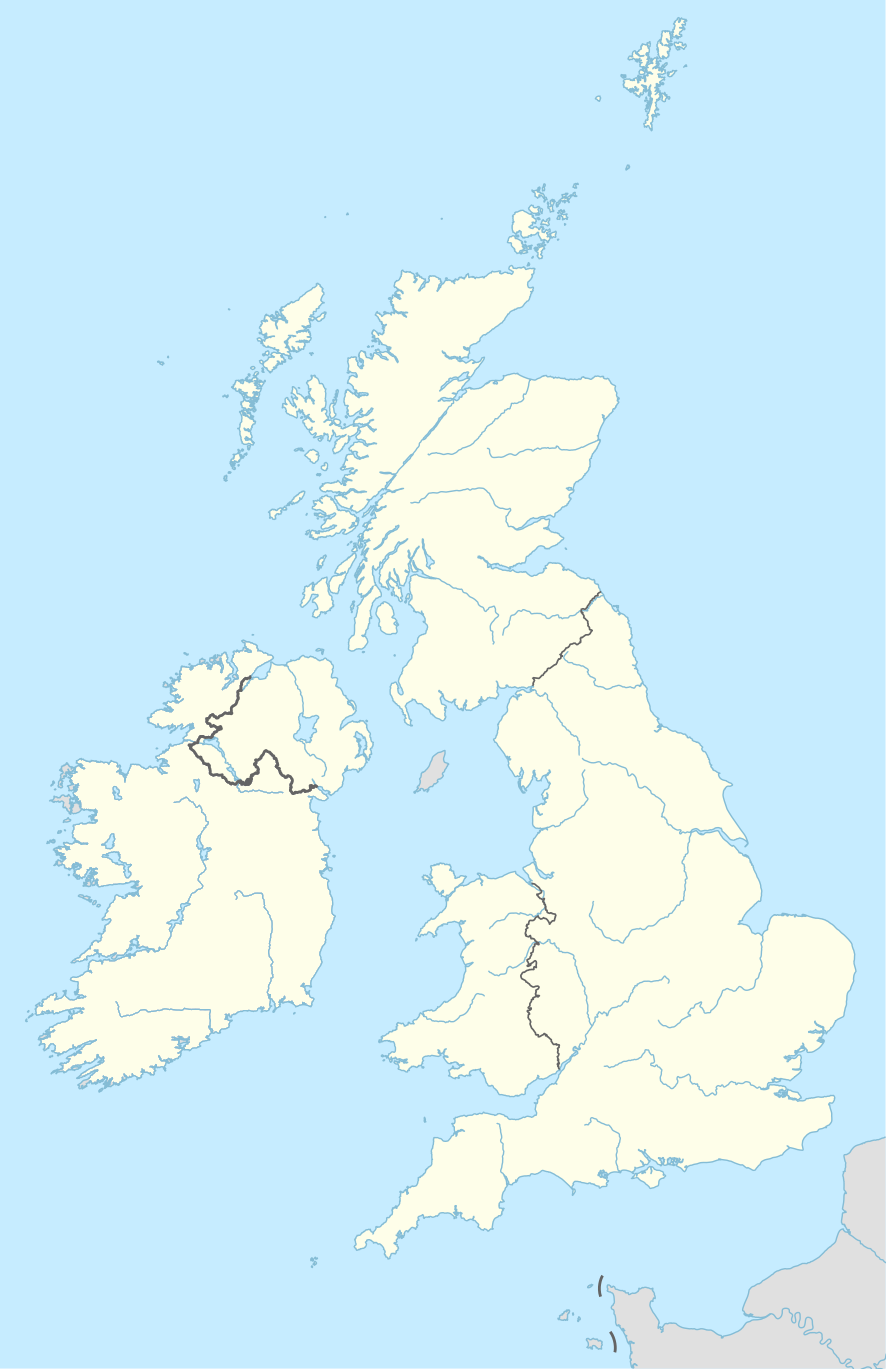
Locations of the 2026 Lory Meagher counties.

| County | Location | Province | Stadium(s) | Capacity |
|---|---|---|---|---|
| Neutral | Dublin | Leinster | Croke Park | 82,300 |
| Cavan | Cavan | Ulster | Breffni Park | 25,030 |
| Lancashire | East Didsbury | Britain | Old Bedians | |
| Leitrim | Carrick-on-Shannon | Connacht | Páirc Seán Mac Diarmada | 9,331 |
| Longford | Longford | Leinster | Pearse Park | 10,000 |
| Monaghan | Clones | Ulster | St Tiernach's Park | 29,000 |
| Warwickshire | Solihull | Britain | Páirc na hÉireann | |

== Statistics ==
=== Top scorers ===
Overall

| Rank | Player | County | Tally | Total | Matches | Average |
|---|---|---|---|---|---|---|
| 1 | | | | | | |
| 2 | | | | | | |
| 3 | | | | | | |
| 4 | | | | | | |
| 5 | | | | | | |
| 6 | | | | | | |
| 7 | | | | | | |
| 8 | | | | | | |
| 9 | | | | | | |
| 10 | | | | | | |

In a single game

| Rank | Player | County | Tally | Total | Opposition |
|---|---|---|---|---|---|
| 1 | | | | | |
| 2 | | | | | |
| 3 | | | | | |
| 4 | | | | | |
| 5 | | | | | |
| 6 | | | | | |
| 7 | | | | | |
| 8 | | | | | |
| 9 | | | | | |
| 10 | | | | | |

=== Scoring events ===
- Widest winning margin: 27 points
  - Longford 5–21 — 1–06 Lancashire (Round 1)
- Most goals in a match: 10
  - Lancashire 4–12 — 6–20 Warwickshire (Round 5)
- Most points in a match: 41
  - Lancashire 2–15 — 2–26 Leitrim (Round 2)
  - Monaghan 0–28 — 1–13 Lancashire (Round 4)
- Most goals by one team in a match: 6
  - Lancashire 4–12 — 6–20 Warwickshire (Round 5)
- Most points by one team in a match: 28
  - Monaghan 0–28 — 1–13 Lancashire (Round 4)
- Highest aggregate score: 62 points
  - Lancashire 4–12 — 6–20 Warwickshire (Round 5)
- Lowest aggregate score: 34 points
  - Leitrim 2–13 — 2–09 Monaghan (Round 1)
- Hat-trick Heros:
  - Mark Moffett (Cavan) 3–01 v Warwickshire (Round 1)

== See also ==
- 2026 All-Ireland Senior Hurling Championship
- 2026 Leinster Senior Hurling Championship
- 2026 Munster Senior Hurling Championship
- 2026 Joe McDonagh Cup (Tier 2)
- 2026 Christy Ring Cup (Tier 3)
- 2026 Nicky Rackard Cup (Tier 4)
