= 2022 Lory Meagher Cup =

Hurling competition

- Dates: 10 April - 21 May 2022
- Teams: 6
- Champions: Louth; Feidhleim Joyce (captain); Paul McCormack (manager)
- Runners-up: Longford; Johnny Casey (captain); Adrian Moran (manager)

Tournament statistics
- Matches played: 15
- Goals scored: 47 (3.13 per match)
- Points scored: 458 (30.53 per match)

The 2022 Lory Meagher Cup is the fourteenth edition of the Lory Meagher Cup since its establishment by the Gaelic Athletic Association in 2009 and is the fifth-tier of Hurling for senior county teams (the All-Ireland Senior Hurling Championship is the first-tier trophy). It is contested by six GAA county teams ranked 30–35 in the 2022 All-Ireland Senior Hurling Championship.

The competition ran from 10 April to 21 May 2022.

== Team changes ==
=== To Championship ===
Relegated from the Nicky Rackard Cup

- Leitrim

Re entered Championship

- Lancashire

=== From Championship ===
Promoted to the Nicky Rackard Cup

- Fermanagh

== Teams ==
=== General Information ===
County	Cup Titles	Last Cup Title	Position in 2021 Championship	Appearance
Cavan	0	—	Runners-up	
Lancashire	0	—	—	
Leitrim	1	2019	Quarter-finals (Nicky Rackard Cup)	
Longford	2	2014	Semi-finals	
Louth	2	2020	Semi-finals	
Monaghan	0	—	Quarter-finals	

=== Personnel and kits ===
County	Manager	Captain(s)	Sponsor
Cavan			
Lancashire			
Leitrim			
Longford			
Louth			
Monaghan			

== Format ==
=== Cup format ===
The 6 teams will play each other once in the Group Stage. The top 2 teams in the group will advance to the final.

=== Promotion ===
The winner of the final will be promoted to the Nicky Rackard Cup.

== Group stage ==
=== Table ===
Pos	Team	Pld	W	D	L	SF	SA	Diff	Pts	Qualification
1	Longford	5	4	0	1	3-95	9-66	+11	8	Advance to Knockout Stage
2	Louth	5	3	0	2	7-86	5-50	+42	6	Advance to Knockout Stage
3	Leitrim	5	3	0	2	13-77	6-74	+24	6	
4	Monaghan	5	4	0	1	3-51	3-47	+4	4*	
5	Lancashire	5	1	0	4	3-63	5-94	-37	2	
6	Cavan	5	0	0	5	5-45	6-86	-44	0	

Monaghan were deducted 4 points for fielding an ineligible player. Games v Louth and Cavan were forfeited without award to opposition. From a scoring difference perspective only, it is treated as if the game never took place (i.e. no score for or against either team involved)

Louth are ranked ahead of Leitrim on head to head record.

=== Group stage results ===
==== Round 1 ====
10 April 2022 Round 1	Lancashire	1-10 - 2-27	Louth	Sports Campus Ireland
	D Connolly 1-4 (0-3f), S Holland 0-2, S Nugent 0-2; E Kelly 0-1, K Fennelly 0-1.	Report	M Gahan 0-7 (4f), S Kerrisk 1-2 (0-1f), F Joyce 0-5; P Mathews 1-0, N Keenan 0-3, S Conneely 0-2; J McDonnell 0-2; L Molloy 0-2, C Quigley 0-1, C Deane 0-1, S Crosbie 0-1, P Fallon 0-1.	Referee: K Parke (Antrim)

10 April 2022 Round 1	Leitrim	4-09 - 0-20	Longford	Páirc Seán Mac Diarmada
	J Murray 1-5, 1 pen, 3f; J McNabola 1-2; K McDermott & B Delaney 1-0 each; G O’Hagan 0-2, 1f.	Report	J O’Brien 0-10, 9f; C Mullane & C Kavanagh 0-2 each; A Quinn, D Buckley, J Mulhern, J Casey, R Murray & P Barden 0-1 each.

10 April 2022 Round 1	Monaghan	3-09 - 2-09	Cavan	Grattan Park

Monaghan forfeited game vs. Cavan due to fielding an ineligible player.

==== Round 2 ====
16 April 2022 Round 2	Longford	0-17 - 1-12	Lancashire	Pearse Park

17 April 2022 Round 2	Louth	3-11 - 5-12	Monaghan	Darver

17 April 2022 Round 2	Cavan	1-10 - 4-16	Leitrim	Breffni Park

Monaghan forfeited game vs. Louth due to fielding an ineligible player.

==== Round 3 ====
23 April 2022 Round 3	Longford	1-16 - 1-15	Louth	Pearse Park

24 April 2022 Round 3	Leitrim	1-16 - 2-18	Monaghan	Páirc Seán Mac Diarmada

24 April 2022 Round 3	Cavan	1-13 - 0-17	Lancashire	Breffni Park

==== Round 4 ====
7 May 2022 Round 4	Monaghan	1-16 - 2-15	Longford	Iniskeen

7 May 2022 Round 4	Louth	2-26 - 1-08	Cavan	Darver

8 May 2022 Round 4	Lancashire	1-08 - 2-20	Leitrim	O'Tooles GAA

==== Round 5 ====
14 May 2022 Round 5	Monaghan	0-17 - 0-16	Lancashire	Iniskeen

14 May 2022 Round 5	Cavan	2-14 - 0-27	Longford	Breffni Park

14 May 2022 Round 5	Leitrim	2-16 - 2-18	Louth	Páirc Seán Mac Diarmada

== Knockout stage ==
=== Final ===
21 May 2022	Longford	3-14 - 3-27	Louth	Croke Park
	P Lynam 0-6 (0-3f, 0-1 65), J O’Brien 1-2 (0-1f), R Murray 1-2, E Naughton 1-0, E Corrigan 0-2, C Mullane 0-1, C Kavanagh 0-1.	Report	D Geoghegan 0-9 (0-6f), P Mathews 2-1, F Joyce 0-6, S Conneely 1-1, L Molloy 0-4, N Keenan 0-2, S Crosbie 0-1, S Kerrisk 0-1, M Gahan 0-1, P Fallon 0-1.	Referee: C. Flynn (Westmeath)

GK	1	Conor Gallagher (Longford Slashers)
RCB	2	Niall Moran (Ringtown, Westmeath)
FB	3	Enda Naughton (St Brendan's, Galway)
LCB	4	Karl Murray (Longford Slashers)
RHB	5	Adam Quinn (Wolfe Tones)
CHB	6	David Buckley (Clonguish Gaels)
LHB	7	Aidan Sheridan (Cashel King Cormacs, Tipperary)
MF	8	Emmet Corrigan (Ringtown, Westmeath)
MF	9	Paddy Lynam (St Oliver Plunkett's, Westmeath)
RHF	10	Evan Tully (Wolfe Tones)
CHF	11	Cian Kavanagh (Longford Slashers)
LHF	12	Reuben Murray (Longford Slashers)
RCF	13	Joe O'Brien (Clonguish Gaels)
FF	14	Cathal Mullane (Wolfe Tones) (c)
LCF	15	John Mulhern (Wolfe Tones)
Substitutes:
	16	Micheál Mulcahy (Longford Slashers) for Mulhern
	17	Pearse McNally (Wolfe Tones) for Sheridan
	18	Dáire Regan (Longford Slashers) for Tully
	19	Paul Barden (Clonguish Gaels) for Kavanagh
	20	Ciarán Farrell (Longford Slashers) for R. Murray
Manager:
Adrian Moran

GK	1	Ruairí Morrissey (St Fechin's)
RCB	2	Danny Morgan (St Fechin's)
FB	3	Donal Ryan (St Fechin's)
LCB	4	Adam Plunkett (Knockbridge)
RHB	5	Matthew Fee (Naomh Moninne)
CHB	6	Conor Quigley (Knockbridge)
LHB	7	Jamie McDonnell (St Fechin's)
MF	8	Seánie Crosbie (St Kevin's)
MF	9	Liam Molloy (Knockbridge)
RHF	10	Peter Fortune (St Fechin's)
CHF	11	Feidhelm Joyce (Naomh Moninne) (c)
LHF	12	Seaghan Conneely (St Fechin's)
RCF	13	Darren Geoghegan (Naomh Moninne)
FF	14	Paul Matthews (St Fechin's)
LCF	15	Seán Kerrisk (St Fechin's)
Substitutes:
	16	Niall Keenan (Tremane, Roscommon) for Fortune
	17	Mark Gahan (Naomh Moninne) for Kerrisk
	18	Pádraig Fallon (Naomh Moninne) for Crosbie
	19	Andrew Smyth (Knockbridge) for Plunkett
	20	Andrew Mackin (Naomh Moninne) for Conneely
Manager:
Paul McCormack

== Statistics ==
=== Scoring events ===
- Widest winning margin: points
  - 000 vs 000 (000)
- Most goals in a match: 8
  - Louth vs Monaghan (Darver)
- Most points in a match: 41
  - Cavan vs Longford (Breffni Park)
    - Louth vs Longford (Croke Park)
- Most goals by one team in a match: 5
  - Monaghan vs Louth (Darver)
- Most points by one team in a match: 27
  - Louth vs Lancashire (Sports Campus Ireland)
    - Longford vs Cavan (Breffni Park)
      - Louth vs Longford (Croke Park)
- Highest aggregate score: 00 points
  - 000 vs 000 (000)
- Lowest aggregate score: 00 points
  - 000 vs 000 (000)

== Miscellaneous ==
- Louth won their 1st championship in 2 years, last winning the 2020 Lory Meagher Cup
- They are also first team to win the Lory Meagher Cup on three occasions.

== See also ==
- 2022 All-Ireland Senior Hurling Championship
- 2022 Leinster Senior Hurling Championship
- 2022 Munster Senior Hurling Championship
- 2022 Joe McDonagh Cup (Tier 2)
- 2022 Christy Ring Cup (Tier 3)
- 2022 Nicky Rackard Cup (Tier 4)
