= 2012 Lory Meagher Cup =

Hurling competition

- Counties coloured by 2012 Championship tier; Lory Meagher Cup counties in grey.
- Dates: 5 May – 9 June 2012
- Teams: 5
- Champions: Tyrone (2nd title); Damien Maguire (captain); Tom Magill (manager)
- Runners-up: Fermanagh; Seán Duffy (manager)

Tournament statistics
- Matches played: 7
- Goals scored: 31 (4.43 per match)
- Points scored: 211 (30.14 per match)

The 2009 Lory Meagher Cup is the fourth edition of the Lory Meagher Cup since its establishment by the Gaelic Athletic Association in 2009 and is the fourth-tier of Hurling for senior county teams (the All-Ireland Senior Hurling Championship is the first-tier trophy). It is contested by five GAA county teams ranked 29–33 in the 2012 All-Ireland Senior Hurling Championship. The draw for the 2012 fixtures took place on 14 November 2011. The competition began on 5 May 2012 and ended on 9 June 2012.

Donegal were the defending champions, however, they availed of their right to promotion to the Nicky Rackard Cup. Tyrone won the competition, defeating Fermanagh in the cup final.

== Format ==
Four teams play in Round 1.

- The 2 Round 1 winners advance to the semi-finals.
- One Round 1 loser goes into Round 2.
- One Round 1 loser goes into Round 3.

In Round 2, one of the Round 1 losers plays Warwickshire.

- The Round 2 winner goes into the semi-finals.
- The Round 2 loser goes into Round 3.

In Round 3, one of the Round 1 losers plays the Round 2 loser.

- The Round 3 winner goes into the semi-finals.

The semi-finals have 4 teams: two Round 1 winners, one Round 2 winner, one Round 3 winner.

The semi-final winners advance to the Lory Meagher Cup final.

== Team changes ==
=== To Championship ===
Relegated from the Nicky Rackard Cup

- None

=== From Championship ===
Promoted to the Nicky Rackard Cup

- Donegal

Withdrew from championship

- Cavan
- South Down

== Teams ==
A total of five teams contested the Lory Meagher Cup, including three sides from the 2011 Lory Meagher Cup and Tyrone and Longford.

County	Last Cup Title	Last Provincial Title	Last All-Ireland Title	Position in 2011 Championship	Appearance
Fermanagh	—	—	—	Quarter-finals	4th
Leitrim	—	—	—	Round 2	4th
Longford	2010	—	—	Quarter-finals	4th
Tyrone	2009	—	—	Runners-up	3rd
Warwickshire	—	—	—	Semi-finals	4th

== Bracket ==
Round 1/2/3; 5/12/21 May
Leitrim	1-10
Warwickshire	2-14
Leitrim	1-06
Tyrone	4-22
Fermanagh	1-19
Longford	1-08
Longford	3-11
Leitrim	2-18

Semi-finals; 26 May
Warwickshire	1-16
Tyrone	2-15
Fermanagh	3-16
Leitrim	2-12

Final; 9 June
Tyrone	2-24
Fermanagh	3-20

== Round 1 ==
=== Matches ===
5 May
Round 1

Leitrim	1-6 – 4-22	Tyrone
C Cunniffe 1-5 (4f 1 '65), M Dolan 0-1.	Report	D Casey 1-7 (2f), C Grogan, S Hagan (1f) 1-3 each, S McKiver 1-1, J Kelly 0-3, S Og Grogan 0-2, A Kelly (1f), G Fox, G Gilmore 0-1 each.

Ballinamore
Referee: G Chapman (Sligo)

5 May
Round 1

Fermanagh	1-19 – 1-8	Longford
R Bogue 0-9 (7f, 1 '65'), S Corrigan 0-5, JP McGarry 1-1, S Duffy 0-2, A Breslin, P McGoldrick 0-1 each.	Report	E Donnellan (1-8, 9f).

Brewster Park
Referee: B Sweeney (Cavan)

== Round 2 ==
12 May
Round 2

Leitrim	1-10 – 2-14	Warwickshire
C Cunniffe 1-7 (6f), N McLoughlin, K McGrath, Z Moradi 0-1 each.	Report	M Ivors (0-9, 4f) E McCabe 1-1, R Wendel 1-0, K Courtney 0-2(1f), D Sheehy, C Beehan 0-1 each.

Ballinamore
Referee: S Cleere (Kilkenny)

== Round 3 ==
21 May
Round 3

Longford	3-11 – 2-18	Leitrim
J Newman 1-2, L Kelly, S Browne 1-0 each, R Donnellan, E Donnellan 0-3 each (1f), T Roche 0-2, K Murray 0-1.	Report	C Cunniffe 1-11 (0-6f, 1-0 pen), K Boyle 1-1, N McLoughlin 0-3, S Moradi, M Poniard, M O'Donoghue 0-1 each.

Pearse Park, Longford
Referee: S Cleere (Kilkenny)

== Semi-finals ==
=== Matches ===
26 May
Semi-final

Fermanagh	3-16 – 2-12	Leitrim
S Corrigan 2-4, D McGarry 1-0, P McGoldrick 0-5 (1f), S Curran 0-3, J Duffy 0-2 (1f), F McBrien, D Teague, 0-1 each.	Report	C Cunniffe 2-8 (0-6f, 0-1 '65'), S Moradi, M Quinn (1 '65') D Poniard, M Poniard, 0-1 each.

Maguiresbridge
Referee: J Clarke (Cavan)

26 May
Semi-final

Warwickshire	1-16 – 2-15	Tyrone
K Courtney 1-2 (3f), M Ivors 0-5 (3f), C Behan, M Bermingham 0-3 each, E McCabe 0-2, C Brough 0-1.	Report	G Gilmore 1-4, D Casey 0-5 (3f), C Grogan 1-0 (1f), S McKiver 0-3, R O'Neill, S Og Grogan, M Grogan 0-1 each.

Páirc na hÉireann, Solihull
Referee: D Copps (Cork)

== Final ==
9 June
Final

Tyrone	2-24 – 3-20	Fermanagh
Justin Kelly 1-08, (0-04f, 0-01 '65'), S Óg Grogan 1-03, C Grogan (0-01f), D Casey (0-04f) 0-04 each, A Kelly 0-02, S McKiver, G Gilmore, R O'Neill 0-01 each.	Report	S Corrigan 1-08, J Duffy 0-07 (0-04f), D McGarry, S Curran 1-01 each, P McGoldrick (2f) 0-02; R Bogue 0-01.

Croke Park, Dublin

== Statistics ==
=== Top scorers ===
==== Overall ====
Rank	Player	County	Tally	Total	Matches	Average
1	Clement Cunniffe	Leitrim	5-31	46	4	11.50
2	Seán Corrigan	Fermanagh	3-17	26	3	8.66
3	Damian Casey	Tyrone	1-16	19	3	6.33

==== Single game ====
Rank	Player	County	Tally	Total	Opposition
1	Clement Cunniffe	Leitrim	2-8	14	Fermanagh
1	Clement Cunniffe	Leitrim	1-11	14	Longford
3	Eoin Donnellan	Longford	1-8	11	Fermanagh
3	Justin Kelly	Tyrone	1-8	11	Fermanagh
3	Seán Corrigan	Fermanagh	1-8	11	Tyrone
6	Seán Corrigan	Fermanagh	2-4	10	Leitrim
6	Damian Casey	Tyrone	1-7	10	Leitrim
8	Ryan Bogue	Fermanagh	0-9	9	Longford
8	Michael Ivors	Warwickshire	0-9	9	Leitrim

== Miscellaneous ==
- Tyrone win their 1st championship in 3 years, last winning the 2009 Lory Meagher Cup

== See also ==
- 2012 All-Ireland Senior Hurling Championship
- 2012 Ulster Senior Hurling Championship
- 2012 Christy Ring Cup (Tier 2)
- 2012 Nicky Rackard Cup (Tier 3)
