= 2015 Lory Meagher Cup =

Hurling competition

- Dates: 2 May 2015 - 6 June 2015
- Teams: 5
- Champions: Fermanagh (1st title)
- Runners-up: Sligo

Tournament statistics
- Matches played: 11
- Goals scored: 44 (4 per match)
- Points scored: 309 (28.09 per match)
- Top scorer(s): Padraig O'Donnell (2-32)

The 2015 Lory Meagher Cup was the seventh edition of the Lory Meagher Cup since its establishment by the Gaelic Athletic Association in 2009 and is the fourth-tier of Hurling for senior county teams (the All-Ireland Senior Hurling Championship is the first-tier trophy). It is contested by five GAA county teams ranked 31–35 in the 2015 All-Ireland Senior Hurling Championship. The championship began on 2 May 2015 and ended on 6 June 2015.

Longford were the defending champions but were successful in gaining promotion to the Nicky Rackard Cup. Lancashire fielded a team for the very first time.

On 6 June 2015, Fermanagh won the championship following a 3–16 to 1–17 defeat of Sligo in the cup final. This was their first Lory Meagher Cup title.

Leitrim's Pádraig O'Donnell was the championship's top scorer with 2-32. John Duffy of Fermanagh was the Lory Meagher Player of the Year.

== Team changes ==
=== To Championship ===
Relegated from the Nicky Rackard Cup

- Sligo

Joined Championship

- Lancashire

=== From Championship ===
Promoted to the Nicky Rackard Cup

- Longford

== Teams ==
A total of five teams contested the Lory Meagher Cup.

County	Last Cup Title	Last Provincial Title	Last All-Ireland Title	Position in 2014 Championship	Appearance
Fermanagh	—	—	—	Runners-up	7th
Lancashire	—	—	—	—	1st
Leitrim	—	—	—	4th	7th
Sligo	—	—	—	Lost relegation playoff (Nicky Rackard Cup)	1st
Warwickshire	2013	—	—	3rd	7th

== Table ==
Pos	Team	Pld	W	D	L	SF	SA	Diff	Pts	Qualification
1	Sligo	4	3	0	1	13-68	5-49	+43	6	Advance to final
2	Fermanagh	4	3	0	1	7-54	11-46	-4	6	Advance to final
3	Leitrim	4	2	0	2	5-60	8-59	-8	4	
4	Warwickshire	4	2	0	2	9-47	7-59	-6	4	
5	Lancashire	4	0	0	4	6-47	9-66	-25	0	

== Rounds 1 to 5 ==
2 May 2015 Round 1	Fermanagh	3-12 - 2-7	Warwickshire	Brewster Park
	C Corrigan 2-1, J Duffy 0-5, JP McGarry 1-0, K McGarry 0-2, D Teague 0-2, K Kehoe 0-1, B McLaughlin 0-1.	Report	D Millea 2-0, E McCabe 0-4, J Reddan 0-2, S Hennessy 0-1.	Referee: K Brady (Louth)

2 May 2015 Round 1	Leitrim	2-12 - 4-16	Sligo	Páirc Sheáin Uí Eislin
	Z Moradi (1-2), P O’Donnell (0-4), K McDermott (1-0), C Cunniffe (0-2), L Moreton (0-2), C Moreton (0-1), J Glancy (0-1).	Report	G O’Kelly Lynch (1-8), C Brennan (2-0), P Leonard (1-2), G Cadden (0-2), R Brennan (0-2), D Fahy (0-1), G Waldron (0-1).

9 May 2015 Round 2	Lancashire	3-9 - 2-16	Fermanagh	Páirc na hÉireann
	C O’Callaghan (1-2), K Magee (1-1), G Jacob (0-4, 1 sideline), C Maskey (0-1), R McEntee (0-1).	Report	J Duffy (0-8, 1 x 65, 6F), C Corrigan (1-1), K McGarry (0-4), E Mahon (1-0 OG), B Duffy (1-0), JP McGarry (0-2), B MacLaughlin (0-1), D Teague (0-1).

9 May 2015 Round 2	Warwickshire	1-15 - 1-18	Leitrim	Páirc na hÉireann
	E McCabe 0-8 (4f), S Hennessy 0-5 (4f), C Moran 1-1, J Meagher 0-1.	Report	P O'Donnell 1-10 (8f), Z Moradi 0-3, J Ryan 0-3, C Moreton 0-2.	Referee: C Cunning (Antrim)

16 May 2015 Round 3	Sligo	1-15 - 3-12	Warwickshire	Markievicz Park
	D Fahy (1-6f), G O'Kelly Lynch (0-4, 2f, 1'65), G Cadden (0-2), B McMahon (0-2), G Waldron (0-1).	Report	E McCabe (0-9, 5f, 1'65), P Crehan (1-1), C McBride (1-0), J Bergin (1-0), S Hennessy (0-2f).	Referee: B Sweeney

16 May 2015 Round 3	Leitrim	1-16 - 1-14	Lancashire	Páirc Sheáin Uí Eislin
	P O'Donnell (1-9, 0-6f), Z Moradi (0-2), C Moreton (0-2), C Cunniffe (0-1), L Moreton (0-1), K Ward (0-1).	Report	C O'Callaghan (0-9, 3f, 1'65), L Knocker (1-0), N Unwin (0-2), K Magee (0-1), C Maskey (0-1), B McAuley (0-1).	Referee: J Clarke

23 May 2015 Round 4	Lancashire	0-13 - 3-21	Sligo	Páirc na hÉireann
	C O'Callaghan 0-11 (9f), J O'Shaughnessy and D Coughlan 0-1 each.	Report	G Cadden 2-2, G O'Kelly-Lynch (4f) and K Raymond (2f) 0-6 each, A Walsh 1-0, G Waldron and B McMahon 0-2, P Leonard, R Brennan and C Brenan (1f) 0-1 each.	Referee: G McGrath (Wexford)

23 May 2015 Round 4	Fermanagh	2-14 - 1-14	Leitrim	Brewster Park
	J Duffy (6f) 0-8; K McGarry, C Corrigan 1-1; S Corrigan 0-2; JP McGarry, T Cleary 0-1 each.	Report	P O’Donnell (4f) 0-9; Z Moradi 1-0; K Ward (2f) 0-4; J Ryan 0-1.

30 May 2015 Round 5	Sligo	5-16 - 0-12	Fermanagh	Kilcoyne Park
	C Brenan 3-4, K Raymond 0-5 (4fs), D Fahy, A Walsh 1-1 each, G Cadden 0-2, G O'Kelly-Lynch, P Leonard, G Waldron 0-1 each.	Report	S Corrigan (1f), T Cleary (1f), Declan McGarry (1f), B MacLaughlin, P McGoldrick (1f) 0-2 each, S Curran, C Corrigan 0-1 each.	Referee: J Clarke (Cavan)

30 May 2015 Round 5	Warwickshire	3-13 - 2-14	Lancashire	Páirc na hÉireann
	E McCabe (0-6, 5f), D Millea (1-1), P Crehan (1-1), C Robbins (1-1), S Hennessy (0-4, 1f).	Report	C O’Callaghan (0-8, 5f), G Jacob (1-1), J Sheehan (1-1), L Knocker (0-1 '65), R McEntee (0-1), D Maskey (0-1), K Magee (0-1).	Referee: K McGeeney

== Final ==
6 June 2015 Final	Sligo	1-17 – 3-16	Fermanagh	Croke Park
15:30 BST	K Raymond (0-09 9f), G O'Kelly-Lynch (0-05 2f), C Brennan (1-0), N Hyland (0-01), G Cadden (0-01), G Waldron (0-01).	Report	D McGarry (2-03, 1 '65, 1f), S Corrigan (1-03), B MacLaughlin (0-05), J Duffy (0-03 2f), JP McGarry (0-01), C Corrigan (0-01).	Referee: J Keane (Galway)

== Statistics ==
=== Top scorers ===
==== Overall ====
Rank	Player	County	Tally	Total	Matches	Average
1	Padraig O'Donnell	Leitrim	2-32	38	4	9.50
2	Colm O'Callaghan	Lancashire	1-30	33	4	8.25
3	Gerard O'Kelly-Lynch	Sligo	1-24	27	4	6.75
3	Emmet McCabe	Warwickshire	0-27	27	4	6.75
5	John Duffy	Fermanagh	0-24	24	4	6.00
6	Ciarán Brennan	Sligo	6-5	23	5	4.60
7	Keith Raymond	Sligo	0-20	20	3	6.66
8	Ciaran Corrigan	Fermanagh	4-4	16	4	4.00
9	Gary Cadden	Sligo	2-9	15	5	3.00
10	Damien Fahy	Sligo	2-8	14	4	3.50

==== Single game ====
Rank	Player	County	Tally	Total	Opposition
1	Ciarán Brennan	Sligo	3-4	13	Fermanagh
2	Padraig O'Donnell	Leitrim	1-10	13	Warwickshire
3	Padraig O'Donnell	Leitrim	1-9	12	Lancashire
4	Gerard O'Kelly-Lynch	Sligo	1-8	11	Leitrim
4	Colm O'Callaghan	Lancashire	0-11	11	Sligo
6	Declan McGarry	Fermanagh	2-3	9	Sligo
6	Keith Raymond	Sligo	0-9	9	Fermanagh
6	Padraig O'Donnell	Leitrim	0-9	9	Fermanagh
9	Gary Cadden	Sligo	2-2	8	Lancashire
9	John Duffy	Fermanagh	0-8	8	Lancashire
9	Emmet McCabe	Warwickshire	0-8	8	Leitrim
9	John Duffy	Fermanagh	0-8	8	Leitrim
9	Colm O'Callaghan	Lancashire	0-8	8	v

== Miscellaneous ==
- Fermanagh win their 1st championship in 21 years, last winning the 1994 Ulster Junior Hurling Championship

== See also ==
- 2015 All-Ireland Senior Hurling Championship
- 2015 Ulster Senior Hurling Championship
- 2015 Christy Ring Cup
- 2015 Nicky Rackard Cup
