= 2013 Lory Meagher Cup =

Hurling competition

- Dates: 4 May 2013 - 8 June 2013
- Teams: 4
- Champions: Warwickshire
- Runners-up: Longford

Tournament statistics
- Matches played: 6
- Goals scored: 18 (3 per match)
- Points scored: 145 (24.17 per match)

The 2013 Lory Meagher Cup is the fifth edition of the Lory Meagher Cup since its establishment by the Gaelic Athletic Association in 2009 and is the fourth-tier of Hurling for senior county teams (the All-Ireland Senior Hurling Championship is the first-tier trophy). It is contested by four GAA county teams ranked 30–33 in the 2013 All-Ireland Senior Hurling Championship.

Warwickshire, Longford, Leitrim and Fermanagh contested the 2013 competition. Tyrone were the defending champions, having won the 2012 competition, but were unable to defend their title as they were promoted to the Nicky Rackard Cup as a result of their victory. Warwickshire won the 2013 competition.

== Team changes ==
=== To Championship ===
Relegated from the Nicky Rackard Cup

- None

=== From Championship ===
Promoted to the Nicky Rackard Cup

- Tyrone

== Teams ==
A total of four teams contested the Lory Meagher Cup.

County	Last Cup Title	Last Provincial Title	Last All-Ireland Title	Position in 2012 Championship	Appearance
Fermanagh	—	—	—	Runners-up	5th
Leitrim	—	—	—	Semi-finals	5th
Longford	2010	—	—	Round 3	5th
Warwickshire	—	—	—	Semi-finals	5th

== Group Stage ==
=== Table ===
Pos	Team	Pld	W	D	L	SF	SA	Diff	Pts	Qualification
1	Warwickshire	3	2	1	0	2-27	1-25	+5	5	Advance to Final
2	Longford	3	2	0	1	10-35	2-32	+27	4	Advance to Final
3	Fermanagh	3	1	1	1	4-38	7-37	-8	3	
4	Leitrim	3	0	0	3	0-19	6-25	-24	0	

=== Round 1 ===
==== Matches ====
4 May 2013	Warwickshire	1-15 – 1-10	Longford	Páirc na hÉireann
16:00	S Hennessey (1-11), C Brough (0-1), P Duggan (0-1), D Sheedy (0-1), A Morrissey (0-1).		J O'Brien (1-2), E Donnellan (0-5), M Coyle (0-1), D Tanner (0-1), K Murray (0-1).	Referee: G McGrath

4 May 2013	Leitrim	0-12 – 3-13	Fermanagh	Seán O'Heslin Park
15:00	C Cunniffe (0-7), S Fox (0-2), D McGovern (0-1), Z Moradi (0-1), M Quinn (0-1).		S Corrigan (1-3), J Duffy (0-4), K Kehoe (1-0), S Curran (1-0), D Teague (0-2), JP McGarry (0-1), R Porteous (0-1), R Bogue (0-1), M Beggan (0-1).	Referee: G Chapman

=== Round 2 ===
==== Matches ====
11 May 2013	Longford	3-12 – 0-07	Leitrim	Glennon Brothers Pearse Park
15:00	E Donnellan (0-7), J O'Brien (1-2), K Murray (1-0), J Newman (1-0), K Connelly (0-2), D Tanner (0-1).		C Cunniffe (0-4), M Dolan (0-1), G McGovern (0-1), P Glancy (0-1).	Referee: S Cleere

11 May 2013	Fermanagh	0-15 – 1-12	Warwickshire	Brewster Park
15:00	R Bogue (0-7), S Corrigan (0-3), S Curran (0-1), K Kehoe (0-1), J Duffy (0-1), B Smyth (0-1), JP McGarry (0-1).		S Hennessy (1-8), E McCabe (0-2), C Robins (0-1), P Duggan (0-1).	Referee: J Clarke

=== Round 3 ===
==== Matches ====
18 May 2013	Longford	6-13 – 1-10	Fermanagh	Pearse Park
15:00	K Conneely (3-1), E Donnellan (0-6, three frees), J O’Brien (1-2), C Finucane (1-1), M Farrell (1-0), K Murray (0-2), D Tanner (0-1).		S Curran (1-2), S Corrigan (0-4), B Smyth (0-2), C Rice (0-1), J Duffy (0-1).	Referee: S Cleere

18 May 2013	Warwickshire	w/o – scr.	Leitrim

== Knockout stage ==
=== Final ===
8 June 2013	Warwickshire	2-16 – 0-10	Longford	Croke Park
12:00	S Hennessy (0-6 3f 2 65s), E Lyons (1-3), E Gleeson (1-0), P Duggan (0-2), M Bermingham (0-2), C Maskey (0-1), C Robbins (0-1), A Morrissey (0-1)	Report	E Donnellan (0-7 6f), J O’Brien (0-2), E Daly (0-1f)	Referee: L McAuley (Antrim)

== Statistics ==
=== Top scorers ===
==== Overall ====
Rank	Player	County	Tally	Total	Matches	Average
1	Seán Hennessy	Warwickshire	2-25	31	3	10.33
2	Eoin Donnellan	Longford	0-25	25	4	6.25
3	Joe O'Brien	Longford	3-8	17	4	4.25

==== Single game ====
Rank	Player	County	Tally	Total	Opposition
1	Seán Hennessy	Warwickshire	1-11	14	Longford
2	Seán Hennessy	Warwickshire	1-8	11	Fermanagh
3	Kevin Conneely	Longford	3-1	10	Fermanagh
4	Clement Cunniffe	Leitrim	0-7	7	Fermanagh
4	Eoin Donnellan	Longford	0-7	7	Leitrim
4	Ryan Bogue	Fermanagh	0-7	7	Warwickshire
4	Eoin Donnellan	Longford	0-7	7	Warwickshire
8	Seán Corrigan	Fermanagh	1-3	6	Leitrim
8	Seán Hennessy	Warwickshire	0-6	6	Longford
8	Eoin Donnellan	Longford	0-6	6	Fermanagh

== Miscellaneous ==
- Warwickshire are the first british county to win the Lory Meagher Cup

== See also ==
- 2013 All-Ireland Senior Hurling Championship
- 2013 Ulster Senior Hurling Championship
- 2013 Christy Ring Cup
- 2013 Nicky Rackard Cup
