= 2020 Lory Meagher Cup =

Hurling competition

- Dates: 24 October – 28 November 2020
- Teams: 3
- Champions: Louth (2nd title); Liam Molloy (captain); Paul McCormack (manager)
- Runners-up: Fermanagh; John Duffy (captain); Joe Baldwin (manager)

Tournament statistics
- Matches played: 4
- Goals scored: 10 (2.5 per match)
- Points scored: 111 (27.75 per match)
- Top scorer(s): Darren Geoghegan (0-20)

The 2020 Lory Meagher Cup was the twelfth edition of the Lory Meagher Cup since its establishment by the Gaelic Athletic Association in 2009 and is the fifth-tier of Hurling for senior county teams (the All-Ireland Senior Hurling Championship is the first-tier trophy). It is contested by three GAA county teams ranked 30–32 in the 2020 All-Ireland Senior Hurling Championship.

This year's cup was contested between Cavan, Fermanagh and Louth. Lancashire were supposed to compete in the competition; however, they didn't due to the impact of the COVID-19 pandemic on Gaelic games. The championship was scheduled to begin in May but will take place in October and November.

The previous year's cup was won by Leitrim after defeating Lancashire in the final. Leitrim advanced to the 2020 Nicky Rackard Cup. Louth were relegated from the 2019 Nicky Rackard Cup after losing a relegation playoff against Monaghan.

Louth were the winners, defeating Fermanagh in the final.

== Team changes ==
=== To Championship ===
Relegated from the Nicky Rackard Cup

- Louth

=== From Championship ===
Promoted to the Nicky Rackard Cup

- Leitrim

Withdrew from Championship

- Lancashire

== Group stage ==
=== Table ===
Pos	Team	Pld	W	D	L	SF	SA	Diff	Pts	Qualification
1	Fermanagh	2	1	1	0	3-26	2-28	+1	3	Advance to Knockout Stage
2	Louth	2	1	0	1	2-29	3-26	0	2	Advance to Knockout Stage
3	Cavan	2	0	1	1	1-29	1-30	–1	1	

==== Round 1 ====
24 October 2020 Round 1	Louth	1-15 (18) – (19) 3-10	Fermanagh	Darver
		(HT: 0-07 - 1-05)		Venue: Darver Centre of Excellence
	Gls: J McDonnell 1 Pts: D Geoghegan 4 (3f); F Joyce 2, S Conneely 2, N Keenan 2, P Lynch 2 (1f); S Crosbie 1, A Mackin 1, D Kettle 1.	Report	Gls: T Keenan 1, S Corrigan 1, J Duffy 1. Pts: S Corrigan 7 (3f); J Duffy 2 (1f); L McCusker 1.	Referee: R Fitzsimons (Offaly); Attendance: 0 (due to the COVID-19 pandemic)

==== Round 2 ====
1 November 2020 Round 2	Fermanagh	0-16 (16) – (16) 1-13	Cavan	Enniskillen
				Venue: Brewster Park
	Pts: S Corrigan 0-8 (6f); C McShea 2, C Duffy 2, T Keenan 2, J Duffy 2 (2f).	Report	Gls: F Hughes 1. Pts: B Fitzgerald 7 (5f, 1 '65); Cillian Sheanon 2; D Carney 1, F Hughes 1, S Keating 1, E Shalvey 1.	Referee: T Conway (Derry)

==== Round 3 ====
8 November 2020 Round 3	Cavan	0-16 (16) – (18) 1-15	Louth	Cavan
				Venue: Breffni Park
	Pts: B Fitzgerald 11 (9f, '65); S Keating 2; F Hughes 1, P Brady 1, Cillian Sheanon 1.	Report	Gls: A Mackin 1 Pts: D Geoghegan 7 (5f); P Matthews 2, D Kettle 2; L Molloy 1, F Joyce 1, R Walsh 1, G Kerrigan 1.	Referee: C McDonald (Antrim)

== Knockout stage ==
=== Final ===
TG4 YouTube

28 November 2020

Fermanagh	2-08 (14) – (25) 2-19	Louth
(HT: 1-03 – 1-06)
Gls: J Duffy 1 (pen), C Corrigan 1 Pts: J Duffy 3fs, C Corrigan 1, C Duffy 1, S Corrigan 1f, T Keenan 1, C McShea 1		Gls: A Mackin 2 Pts: D Geoghegan 9fs, David Kettle 2, Paul Mathews 2, C Deane 1, N Keenan 1, R Walsh 1, P Fallon 1, A Mackin 1, F Joyce 1

Croke Park
Referee: Gearóid McGrath (Wexford)

GK	1	Mark Curry
RCB	2	Ciarán Duffy
FB	3	Andrew Breslin
LCB	4	Rory Porteous
RHB	5	Aidan Flanagan
CHB	6	Daniel Teague
LHB	7	Francis McBrien
MF	8	Conor McShea
MF	9	Dylan Bannon
RHF	10	Caolan Duffy
CHF	11	Mark Slevin
LHF	12	John Duffy (c)
RCF	13	Tom Keenan
FF	14	Seán Corrigan
LCF	15	Ciarán Corrigan
Substitutes:
	16	Barry McPhillips for S. Corrigan
	17	John Paul McGarry for Bannon
	18	Luca McCusker for Slevin
	19	Shea Curran for Flanagan
	20	Adam McShea for Keenan
Manager:
Joe Baldwin

GK	1	Donal Connolly (Naomh Moninne)
RCB	2	Matthew Fee (Naomh Moninne)
FB	3	Ronan Byrne (Knockbridge)
LCB	4	Liam Molloy (Knockbridge) (c)
RHB	5	Conor Deane (Knockbridge)
CHB	6	Jamie McDonnell (St Fechin's)
LHB	7	Andrew McCrave (Pearse Óg)
MF	8	Niall Keenan (Tremane, Roscommon)
MF	9	James Costelloe (Knockbridge)
RHF	10	Darren Geoghegan (Naomh Moninne)
CHF	11	Feidhelm Joyce (Naomh Moninne)
LHF	12	Seánie Crosbie (St Kevin's)
RCF	13	Paul Matthews (St Fechin's)
FF	14	Andrew Mackin (Naomh Moninne)
LCF	15	David Kettle (Knockbridge)
Substitutes:
	16	Darren O'Hanrahan (Naomh Moninne) for Costelloe
	17	Ryan Walsh (St Fechin's) for Kettle
	18	Pádraig Fallon (Naomh Moninne) for Joyce
	19	Gavin Kerrigan (Knockbridge) for Matthews
	20	Shane Callan (Pearse Óg) for Keenan
Manager:
Paul McCormack

== Statistics ==
=== Top scorers ===
==== Overall ====
Rank	Player	Club	Tally	Total	Matches	Average
1	Darren Geoghegan	Louth	0-20	20	3	6.66
2	Seán Corrigan	Fermanagh	1-16	19	3	6.33
3	Brian Fitzgerald	Cavan	0-18	18	2	9.00

==== In a single game ====
Rank	Player	Club	Tally	Total	Opposition
1	Brian Fitzgerald	Cavan	0-11	11	Louth
2	Seán Corrigan	Fermanagh	1-07	10	Louth
3	Darren Geoghegan	Louth	0-09	9	Fermanagh
4	Seán Corrigan	Fermanagh	0-08	8	Cavan
5	John Duffy	Fermanagh	1-03	6	Louth

== Miscellaneous ==
- Louth won their 1st championship in 4 years, last winning the 2016 Lory Meagher Cup.

== See also ==
- 2020 All-Ireland Senior Hurling Championship
- 2020 Leinster Senior Hurling Championship
- 2020 Munster Senior Hurling Championship
- 2020 Joe McDonagh Cup
- 2020 Christy Ring Cup
- 2020 Nicky Rackard Cup
