= 2014 Lory Meagher Cup =

Lory Meagher Cup hurling championship

- Dates: 3 May – 7 June 2014
- Teams: 4
- Champions: Longford (2nd title)
- Runners-up: Fermanagh

Tournament statistics
- Matches played: 7
- Goals scored: 20 (2.86 per match)
- Points scored: 193 (27.57 per match)

The 2014 Lory Meagher Cup is the sixth edition of the Lory Meagher Cup since its establishment by the Gaelic Athletic Association in 2009 and is the fourth-tier of Hurling for senior county teams (the All-Ireland Senior Hurling Championship is the first-tier trophy). It is contested by four GAA county teams ranked 31–34 in the 2014 All-Ireland Senior Hurling Championship. The cup competition began on 3 May 2014 and ended on 7 June 2014.

Warwickshire were the defending champions, however, they finished third in the group stage. Longford won the title after defeating Fermanagh by 3-18 to 3-16 in the final. The also were promoted to the 2015 Nicky Rackard Cup by defeating Sligo in the relegation-promotion play off.

== Teams ==
A total of four teams contested the Lory Meagher Cup.

County	Last Cup Title	Last Provincial Title	Last All-Ireland Title	Position in 2013 Championship	Appearance
Fermanagh	—	—	—		6th
Leitrim	—	—	—		6th
Longford	2010	—	—		6th
Warwickshire	2013	—	—		6th

== Table ==
Pos	Team	Pld	W	D	L	SF	SA	Diff	Pts	Qualification
1	Longford	3	2	1	0	3-47	2-28	+22	5	Advance to final
2	Fermanagh	3	2	1	0	7-48	2-45	+18	5	Advance to final
3	Warwickshire	3	1	0	2	1-37	6-43	-21	2	
4	Leitrim	3	0	0	3	3-27	4-43	-19	0	

== Round 1 ==
=== Matches ===
3 May 2014 Round 1	Warwickshire	0-18 - 2-17	Fermanagh	Páirc na hÉireann
13:00		Report	S Corrigan 0-11 (8fs), B McGarry 1-2, J Duffy 1-0, S Curran 0-2, F McBrien, C Corrigan 0-1 each.

3 May 2014 Round 1	Leitrim	0-9 - 0-12	Longford	Páirc Seán Mac Diarmada
14:30	P O'Donnell (0-5), C Cunniffe (0-4).		E Donnellan (0-10), J Casey (0-1), J O'Brien (0-1).

== Round 2 ==
=== Matches ===
10 May 2014 Round 2	Longford	2-17 - 0-4	Warwickshire	Glennon Brothers Pearse Park
13:00	J O'Brien (1-4), C Mullane (1-2), J Newman (0-3), G Ghee (0-3), E Donnellan (0-3), J Casey (0-1), K Connelly (0-1).		S Hennessy (0-3), P Crehan (0-1).	Referee: P O'Dwyer

10 May 2014 Round 2	Fermanagh	3-16 - 1-9	Leitrim	Brewster Park
13:30	S Corrigan (0-10), C Corrigan (2-0), F McBrien (0-4), D McGarry (1-0), B McGarry (0-1), J Duffy (0-1.)		P O'Donnell (0-7), F Earley (1-0), C Cunniffe (0-1), J Glancy (0-1).	Referee: B Sweeney

== Round 3 ==
=== Matches ===
17 May 2014 Round 3	Leitrim	2-9 - 1-15	Warwickshire	Páirc Seán Mac Diarmada
13:00	C Cunniffe (0-6), S Moradi (1-0), F Earley (1-0), M Poniard (0-1), D McGovern (0-1), C Moreton (0-1).		S Hennessy (0-5), K O'Leary (1-1), C Robbins (0-3), S Walsh (0-3), D Kennedy (0-2), D Sheedy (0-1).	Referee: J Clarke

17 May 2014 Round 3	Longford	1-18 - 2-15	Fermanagh	Glennon Brothers Pearse Park
14:30	J O'Brien 0-10 (6f), G Ghee 0-4, C Kavanagh 1-1, L Kelly 0-2, P Barden 0-1.	Report	R Porteous 2-0, P McGoldrick 0-6 (4fs '65'), R Bogue 0-4, J P McGarry, S Curran 0-2 (2fs) each, B McGarry 0-1.	Referee: L McAuley (Antrim)

== Final ==
7 June 2014 Final	Longford	3-18 - 3-16	Fermanagh	Croke Park
12:00	E Donnellan (1-9, 1-7 frees, one 65), J O’Brien (2-2), C Mullane (0-3), K Connelly (0-2), J Casey and J Newman (0-1 each).	Report	S Corrigan (0-10, eight frees, one 65), D McGarry (3-1), R Bogue, F McBrien, J Duffy, C Corrigan and S Curran (0-1 each).	Referee: J Clarke (Cavan)

== Statistics ==
=== Top scorers ===
==== Overall ====
Rank	Player	County	Tally	Total	Matches	Average
1	Seán Corrigan	Fermanagh	0-31	31	3	10.33
2	Joe O'Brien	Longford	3-17	26	4	6.50
3	Eoin Donnellan	Longford	1-22	25	3	8.33

==== Single game ====
Rank	Player	County	Tally	Total	Opposition
1	Eoin Donnellan	Longford	1-9	12	Fermanagh
2	Seán Corrigan	Fermanagh	0-11	11	Warwickshire
3	Seán Corrigan	Fermanagh	0-10	10	Longford
3	Eoin Donnellan	Longford	0-10	10	Leitrim
3	Seán Corrigan	Fermanagh	0-10	10	Leitrim
3	Joe O'Brien	Longford	0-10	10	Fermanagh

== Miscellaneous ==
- Longford win their 1st championship in 4 years, last winning the 2010 Lory Meagher Cup

== See also ==
- 2014 All-Ireland Senior Hurling Championship
- 2014 Ulster Senior Hurling Championship
- 2014 Christy Ring Cup
- 2014 Nicky Rackard Cup
