= 2017 Lory Meagher Cup =

Hurling competition

- Dates: 22 April 2017 - 10 June 2017
- Teams: 6
- Champions: Warwickshire (2nd title)
- Runners-up: Leitrim

Tournament statistics
- Matches played: 16
- Goals scored: 56 (3.5 per match)
- Points scored: 491 (30.69 per match)

The 2017 Lory Meagher Cup was the ninth edition of the Lory Meagher Cup since its establishment by the Gaelic Athletic Association in 2009 and is the fourth-tier of Hurling for senior county teams (the All-Ireland Senior Hurling Championship is the first-tier trophy). It is contested by six GAA county teams ranked 30–35 in the 2017 All-Ireland Senior Hurling Championship.

Louth, the 2016 champions, play in the Nicky Rackard Cup having won promotion. Cavan returned to senior inter-county hurling in 2017 by entering The Lory Meagher Cup. They had disbanded midway through the 2011 season.

== Teams ==
The participating teams were

Britain (2): Lancashire and Warwickshire

Connacht (2): Leitrim and Sligo

Ulster (2): Cavan and Fermanagh

== Team changes ==
=== To Championship ===
Relegated from the Nicky Rackard Cup

- Fermanagh

Re entered Championship

- Cavan

=== From Championship ===
Promoted to the Nicky Rackard Cup

- Louth

== Group Stage ==
=== Table ===
Pos	Team	Pld	W	D	L	SF	SA	Diff	Pts	Qualification
1	Warwickshire	5	5	0	0	14-95	8-53	+60	10	Advance to Final
2	Leitrim	5	3	0	2	8-79	10-63	+10	6	Advance to Final
3	Sligo	5	3	0	2	15-65	7-74	+15	6	
4	Lancashire	5	2	0	3	3-87	7-74	+1	4	
5	Cavan	5	1	0	4	6-70	5-109	-36	2	
6	Fermanagh	5	1	0	4	10-67	19-90	-50	2	

Leitrim are ranked above Sligo because they won the head to head game between the teams.

=== Round 1 ===
==== Matches ====
22 April 2017 Round 1	Sligo	4-14 - 0-17	Lancashire	Markiewicz Park, Sligo
	C Kevin Gilmartin 3-1, K Raymond 0-8 (8fs), EKilgannon 1-0; K Banks, C Behan, E McDonagh, P Burke, J McHugh 0-1 each.	Report	R Crowley 0-13 (2fs), Darragh O'Brien, Nathan Unwin, 0-2 each.	Referee: K McGeeney (Roscommon)

22 April 2017 Round 1	Cavan	1-14 - 3-28	Warwickshire	Breffni Park, Cavan
	D Cahill 0-8 (7fs, 1 ’65); L McKenna 1-0; K Conneely, S Keating 0-2 each, R Everett, M Moffett 0-1 each.	Report	L Watson 2-7, S Caulfield 0-6, E Dwyer 1-3, E McCabe 0-4, P Unlacke, K McGee, P Crehan 0-2 each, D Kennedy 0-1, P Hoban (1f).	Referee: S Hynes (Galway)

22 April 2017 Round 1	Fermanagh	5-13 - 2-21	Leitrim	Brewster Park, Enniskillen
	S Corrigan 3-8 (5f), S Curran 1-3, C McShea 1-0, R Bogue, J Duffy (f) 0-1 each.	Report	P O’Donnell 2-7 (7f), C Cunniffe 0-7 (5f), J Glancy 0-3, C O’Donovan 0-2, L Moreton, K McDermott 0-1 each.

=== Round 2 ===
==== Matches ====
29 April 2017 Round 2	Leitrim	1-20 - 0-12	Cavan	Páirc Seán Mac Diarmada, Carrick
	P O'Donnell 0-7, Z Moradi 1-3, C Moreton 0-5, G O'Hagan 0-2, D McGovern 0-1, K McDermott 0-1, D Molloy 0-1.		K Conneely 0-4, S Keating 0-3, D Cahill 0-2, R everett 0-2, N Browne 0-1.

29 April 2017 Round 2	Warwickshire	2-20 - 2-9	Sligo	Páirc na hÉireann, Birmingham
	S Hennessy 0-8, S Caulfield 1-4, K McGee 1-1, L Watson 0-4, Robins 0-1.		C Behan 2-2, K Raymond 0-4, J McHugh 0-2, E McDonagh 0-1.

29 April 2017 Round 2	Lancashire	2-22 - 0-15	Fermanagh	Old Bedians, Manchester
	R Crowley 2-14 (0-5fs, 0-1 '65', 0-1 sl), D Cahalane, S Power (1f), D O'Brien 0-2 each, N Unwin, T Duane 0-1 each.	Report	S Corrigan 0-7 (3fs), M Teague 0-2, R Bogue, F McBrien, J Duffy, D McGarry, C Corrigan, S Curran 0-1 each.	Referee: J Larkin (Cork)

=== Round 3 ===
==== Matches ====
5 May 2017 Round 3	Leitrim	1-12 - 0-14	Lancashire	Páirc Seán Mac Diarmada, Carrick
	Z Moradi 1-2, C Cunniffe 0-9 (6f, 2'65), L Moreton 0-1.		S Power 0-5 (5f), R Crowley 0-4 (2f), N Unwin 0-2, S Sexton, S Duncan, A Slattery 0-1 each.

5 May 2017 Round 3	Cavan	0-9 - 1-20	Sligo	Kingspan Breffni Park, Cavan
	K Conneely 0-3 (2f); N Browne, S Keating (1f) 0-2 each; A Sheridan ('65), F Hughes 0-1 each.		C Behan 0-11fs; J McHugh 1-5; L Reidy, G O'Kelly Lynch, K Gilmartin, T O'Kelly Lynch 0-1 each.

5 May 2017 Round 3	Fermanagh	3-9 - 6-16	Warwickshire	Brewster Park, Enniskillen
	S Corrigan 1-6; JP McGarry and J Duffy 1-0 each; F McBrien, C McShea, B McGarry 0-1 each.		L Watson 3-7, P Uniacke 2-0, S Hennessey 0-3, S Caulfield 0-3, K McGee 1-0, I Dwyer 0-2, C McBride 0-1.

=== Round 4 ===
==== Matches ====
13 May 2017 Round 4	Lancashire	0-24 - 1-18	Cavan	Old Bedians, Manchester
14:00	R Crowley 0-20, A Slattery 0-2, D O'Brien 0-1, D Cahalane 0-1.		C Sheanon 1-6, D Cahill 0-5, C Shearon 0-2, S Harten 0-2, F Hughes 0-2, M Sexton 0-1.

13 May 2017 Round 4	Sligo	5-14 - 2-13	Fermanagh	Markievicz Park, Sligo
15:00	C Behan 2-8, J McHugh 2-1, G O'Kelly-Lynch 1-1, L Reidy 0-1, E McDonagh 0-1, M Davey 0-1, K Gilmartin 0-1.		S Curran 1-3, S Corrigan 0-6, B Jones 1-0, M Teague 0-1, C Corrigan 0-1, R Bogue 0-1, R Porteous 0-1.

13 May 2017 Round 4	Warwickshire	2-16 - 1-11	Leitrim	Páirc na hÉireann, Solihull
	L Watson 0-7, I Dwyer 1-3, P Uniacke 1-1, S Caulfield 0-3, P Hoban 0-1, C Robbins 0-1.		P O'Donnell 1-5, C Byrne 0-1, J Glancy 0-1, M Quinn 0-1, L Moreton 0-1, C Moreton 0-1, D McGovern 0-1.

=== Round 5 ===
==== Matches ====
20 May 2017 Round 5	Fermanagh	0-17 - 4-17	Cavan	Lisbellaw
	S Corrigan 0-9, (5f); C Corrigan; S Curran 0-2 each; F McBrien; C McShea; R Bogue; B McGarry 0-1 each.	Report	Colum Sheanon 2-5; J Sheanon 1-6, 1f; K Conneely 1-0; Cillian Sheanon; S Keating; R O’Hagan; D Cahill (f); M Sexton; N Browne 0-1 each.

20 May 2017 Round 5	Lancashire	1-10 - 1-15	Warwickshire	Old Bedians, Manchester
	R Crowley (1-6,5f), N Unwin (0-1), S Richardson (0-1), A Slattery (0-1), S Power (0-1).	Report	S Caulfield (0-10, 7f), J Reddin (1-0), E McCabe (0-2), I Dwyer (0-2), J Meagher (0-1).

20 May 2017 Round 5	Leitrim	3-15 - 3-8	Sligo	Páirc Seán Mac Diarmada, Carrick-on-Shannon
	P O’Donnell 2-6 (3 65 2f ), Z Moradi 1-2, K McDermott 0-3, C Moreton 0-2, C O’Donovan 0-2.	Report	M Davey 2-0, M Gilmartin 1-0, K Raymond 0-2 (1f), C Behan 0-3, K Banks, M O’Callaghan, C Griffin 0-1 each.

== Final ==
10 June 2017
13.00

Warwickshire	0-17 - 0-11	Leitrim
L Watson 0-11fs, S Caulfield 0-2, D Kennedy, P Uniacke, C McBride, I Dwyer 0-1 each.	Report	P O'Donnell 0-6fs, C O'Donovan 0-2, Z Moradi, C Moreton, J Glancy 0-1 each.

Croke Park, Dublin
Referee: J Connors (Donegal)

Warwickshire are promoted to the 2018 Nicky Rackard Cup.

== Statistics ==
=== Top scorers ===
==== Overall ====
Rank	Player	Team	Tally	Total
1	Ronan Crowley	Lancashire	2-51	57
2	Liam Watson	Warwickshire	5-25	40
3	Seán Corrigan	Fermanagh	4-27	39
4	Cormac Behan	Sligo	4-22	34
5	Pádraig O'Donnell	Leitirm	3-19	28
6	Joe McHugh	Sligo	3-09	18
7	Clement Cunniffe	Leitirm	0-16	16
8	Diarmuid Cahill	Cavan	0-15	15
9	Shea Curran	Fermanagh	2-07	13
10	Kevin Gilmartin	Sligo	3-03	12
10	Keith Raymond	Sligo	0-12	12

==== In a single game ====
Rank	Player	Team	Tally	Total	Opposition
1	Ronan Crowley	Lancashire	2-14	20	Fermanagh
1	Ronan Crowley	Lancashire	0-20	20	Cavan
3	Seán Corrigan	Fermanagh	3-08	17	Leitrim
4	Liam Watson	Warwickshire	3-07	16	Fermanagh
4	Cormac Behan	Sligo	2-08	14	Fermanagh
6	Pádraig O'Donnell	Leitrim	2-07	13	Fermanagh
6	Liam Watson	Warwickshire	2-07	13	Cavan
6	Ronan Crowley	Lancashire	0-13	13	Sligo
9	Cormac Behan	Sligo	0-11	11	Cavan
10	Kevin Gilmartin	Sligo	3-01	10	Lancashire

=== Scoring events ===
- Widest winning margin: 20 points
  - Cavan 1-14 - 3-28 Warwickshire (Round 1)
- Most goals in a match: 9
  - Fermanagh 3-09 - 6-16 Warwickshire (Round 3)
- Most points in a match: 42
  - Cavan 1-14 - 3-28 Warwickshire (Round 1)
  - Lancashire 0-24 - 1-18 Cavan (Round 4)
- Most goals by one team in a match: 6
  - Fermanagh 3-09 - 6-16 Warwickshire (Round 3)
- Most points by one team in a match: 28
  - Cavan 1-14 - 3-28 Warwickshire (Round 1)
- Highest aggregate score: 55 points
  - Fermanagh 5-13 - 2-21 Leitrim (Round 1)
- Lowest aggregate score: 28 points
  - Warwickshire 0-17 - 0-11 Leitrim (Final)

== Miscellaneous ==
- Warwickshire win their 1st championship in 4 years, last winning the 2013 Lory Meagher Cup

== See also ==
- 2017 All-Ireland Senior Hurling Championship
- 2017 Ulster Senior Hurling Championship
- 2017 Christy Ring Cup (Tier 2)
- 2017 Nicky Rackard Cup (Tier 3)
