= 2021 Lory Meagher Cup =

Hurling competition

- Dates: 26 June – 31 July 2021
- Teams: 5
- Champions: Fermanagh (2nd title); John Duffy (captain); Joe Baldwin (manager)
- Runners-up: Cavan; Matthew Hynes (captain); Ollie Bellew (manager)

Tournament statistics
- Matches played: 8

The 2021 Lory Meagher Cup was the thirteenth edition of the Lory Meagher Cup since its establishment by the Gaelic Athletic Association in 2009 and is the fifth-tier of Hurling for senior county teams (the All-Ireland Senior Hurling Championship is the first-tier trophy). It is contested by five GAA county teams ranked 28–32 in the 2021 All-Ireland Senior Hurling Championship.

== Team changes ==
=== To Championship ===
Relegated from the Nicky Rackard Cup

- Longford
- Monaghan

== Format ==
Cup format

The format was changed for 2021, with 5 teams playing across two groups, one with 3 teams and one with 2 teams based on an open draw.

Group A featured 3 teams and was played in a single Round Robin format with each team having one home game and one away game.

Group B featured 2 teams who played a single fixture.

All teams played a knockout format after this group stage, with the group winners and second-placed team in Group A being placed in the semi-finals. A tie between the third-placed team in Group A and second-placed team in Group B determined the fourth semi-finalist.

All-Ireland Senior Hurling Championship

There was no direct qualification to the All-Ireland Senior Hurling Championship proper for Lory Meagher Cup teams.

Promotion to Nicky Rackard Cup

The winner of the Lory Meagher Cup was also promoted automatically to the following year's Nicky Rackard Cup, which is the fourth tier of the All-Ireland Senior Hurling Championship. They would be replaced by the bottom-placed team in the 2021 Nicky Rackard Cup.

Relegation

There was no relegation from the Lory Meagher Cup as this is the lowest grade (5th Tier) in the All-Ireland Senior Hurling Championship.

== Group stage ==
=== Group A ===
Pos	Team	Pld	W	D	L	SF	SA	Diff	Pts	Qualification
1	Longford	2	1	1	0	9-41	3-38	+21	3	Advance to Semi-Finals
2	Louth	2	1	0	1	6-34	8-42	-14	2	Advance to Semi-Finals
3	Monaghan	2	0	1	1	0-36	4-31	-7	1	Advance to Quarter-Final

==== Group A round 1 ====
26 June 2021 Round 1	Longford	8-25 - 3-19	Louth	Glennon Brothers Pearse Park
	J O’Brien (0-12, 0-4fs, 0-1’65), R Murray (3-2), D Buckley (1-4, 0-1 sideline cut), M Coyle (2-0), D Connell (1-2), C Mullane (1-0), J Mulhern (0-2); S Creaven (0-2), B Hanley (0-1), A Quinn (0-1).	Report	D Geoghegan (0-10, 0-9 frees), F Joyce (1-2), D Kettle (1-1), E Maher (1-0), N Keenan (0-2), D O’Hanrahan (0-1); R Walsh (0-1), C Quigley (0-1), A Mackin (0-1).

==== Group A round 2 ====
3 July Round 2	Louth	3-15 - 0-17	Monaghan

==== Group A round 3 ====
10/11 July Round 3	Monaghan	0-19 v 1-16	Longford

=== Group B ===
Pos	Team	Pld	W	D	L	SF	SA	Diff	Pts	Qualification
1	Cavan	1	1	0	0	1-16	0-17	+2	2	Advance to Semi-Finals
2	Fermanagh	1	0	0	1	0-17	1-16	-2	0	Advance to Quarter-Final

==== Group A round 1 ====
4 June Round 1	Cavan	1-16 - 0-17	Fermanagh

== Knockout stage ==
=== Bracket ===
Quarter-Final - 17 July
2B	Fermanagh	3-15
3A	Monaghan	4-06

Semi-Finals - 24 July
1A	Longford	1-13
2B	Fermanagh	1-21
1B	Cavan	1-21
2A	Louth	0-20

Final - 31 July
1A	Fermanagh	3-26
1B	Cavan	1-17

=== Quarter-final ===
Fermanagh 3-15 - 4-06 Monaghan

=== Semi-finals ===
Longford 1-13 - 1-21 Fermanagh

Cavan 1-21 - 0-20 Louth

=== Final ===
31 July
Final

https://www.gaa.ie/hurling/news/lory-meagher-cup-final-keenan-stars-for-fermanagh/

Cavan	1-17 – 3-26	Fermanagh
Pts: Tom Keenan 3-2, John Duffy 0-8 (7f), Conor McShea 0-4, Sean Corrigan 0-4, Barney McAuley 0-2 (2f), Ryan Bogue 0-1, Daniel Teague 0-1, Caolan Duffy 0-1, Mark Slevin 0-1, Andrew Breslin 0-1		Pts: Brian Fitzgerald 0-9 (6f, two 65s), Cillian Sheanon 0-3, Philip Brady 1-0, Neasan Neary 0-1, Sean Keating 0-1, Colum Sheanon 0-1, Caoimhin Carney 0-1

Croke Park, Dublin
Referee: Michael Kennedy

== Statistics ==
=== Scoring events ===
- Widest winning margin: 00 points
  - 000 vs 000 (000)
- Most goals in a match: 00
  - 000 vs 000 (000)
- Most points in a match: 00
  - 000 vs 000 (000)
- Most goals by one team in a match: 00
  - 000 vs 000 (000)
- Most points by one team in a match: 00
  - 000 vs 000 (000)
- Highest aggregate score: 00 points
  - 000 vs 000 (000)
- Lowest aggregate score: 00 points
  - 000 vs 000 (000)

== Miscellaneous ==
- Fermanagh win their 1st championship in 6 years, last winning the 2015 Lory Meagher Cup

== See also ==
- 2021 All-Ireland Senior Hurling Championship
- 2021 Leinster Senior Hurling Championship
- 2021 Munster Senior Hurling Championship
- 2021 Joe McDonagh Cup
- 2021 Christy Ring Cup
- 2021 Nicky Rackard Cup
