= 2016 Lory Meagher Cup =

Hurling competition

- Dates: 30 April 2016 - 04 June 2016
- Teams: 5
- Champions: Louth (1st title)
- Runners-up: Sligo

Tournament statistics
- Matches played: 11

The 2016 Lory Meagher Cup was the eighth edition of the Lory Meagher Cup since its establishment by the Gaelic Athletic Association in 2009 and is the fourth-tier of Hurling for senior county teams (the All-Ireland Senior Hurling Championship is the first-tier trophy). It is contested by five GAA county teams ranked 31–35 in the 2016 All-Ireland Senior Hurling Championship. The championship began on 23 April 2016 and ended on 4 June 2016.

Fermanagh were the 2015 champions and play in the Nicky Rackard Cup having won promotion.

== Team changes ==
=== To Championship ===
Relegated from the Nicky Rackard Cup

- Louth

=== From Championship ===
Promoted to the Nicky Rackard Cup

- Fermanagh

== Group Stage ==
=== Table ===
Pos	Team	Pld	W	D	L	SF	SA	Diff	Pts	Qualification
1	Louth	4	4	0	0	6-67	4-47	+26	8	Advance to Final
2	Sligo	4	3	0	1	7-80	5-53	+33	6	Advance to Final
3	Warwickshire	4	2	0	2	15-56	9-58	+16	4	
4	Leitrim	4	1	0	3	6-50	6-67	-17	2	
5	Lancashire	4	0	0	4	4-46	13-74	-55	0	

=== Matches ===
23 April 2016 Round 1	Leitrim	1-15 - 3-19	Warwickshire	Seán O'Heslin Memorial Park, Ballinamore
	G O'Hagan 1-0, C Cunniffe 0-13 (12f) J Ryan, Z Moradi 0-1 each.	Report	L Reale 2-3, C Robins 1-1, P Crehan0-5 (3f 1'65), S Morrissey 0-5, J Reddan 0-4, J Quinn 0-1.	Referee: K McGeeney (Roscommon)

23 April 2016 Round 1	Louth	0-22 - 1-15	Sligo	Louth GAA Centre of Excellence
	D Murphy 0-12 (8fs, 1 '65'), P Lynch 0-3, N Stanley, S Callan 0-2 each; Gerard Smith, Andrew McCrave, D O'Hanrahan 0-1 each.	Report	K Raymond 0-10 (8fs), C Behan 0-5 (1f) K Gilmartin 1-0.	Referee: M Murtagh (Armagh)

30 April 2016 Round 2	Warwickshire	2-10 - 3-14	Louth	Páirc na hÉireann, Solihull
	O Long 1-1, P Crehan 0-6 (6fs), S Morrissey 1-2, J Redden, P Treacy 0-1 (1f) each.	Report	D Murphy (4f) 1-6; S Conneely, A Mackin 1-0 each; L Dwan (2f), S Callan, G Smyth 0-2 each, A McCrave, P Lynch 0-1 each.	Referee: R McGann

30 April 2016 Round 2	Lancashire	2-10 - 2-18	Leitrim	Páirc na hÉireann, Solihull
	D Maskey 1-1, K McGee 1-0, P Duggan 0-4 (2fs, 1 '65'), B Cody, J Sheehan 0-2 each, N Unwin 0-1.	Report	P O'Donnell 1-8 (5fs, 1 '65'), G O'Hagan 1-3, C Cunniffe, C Moreton 0-2 each, L Moreton, J Ryan, Z Moradi 0-1 each.	Referee: J Murphy (Limerick)

7 May 2016 Round 3	Louth	3-15 - 0-10	Lancashire	Dunleer
13:00	D Murphy 0-9 (4fs, 1 65); G Smith 1-2; A McCrave 1-0; N Stanley 1-0; A Mackin 0-2; M Lyons, D Kettle 0-1 each.	Report	P Duggan 0-5 (3fs); K Magee, D Cahallane, C Maskey, J Patton, R McEntee 0-1 each.	Referee: A Ferguson

7 May 2016 Round 3	Sligo	3-18 - 3-11	Warwickshire	Sligo GAA Centre of Excellence
14:00	K Raymond 1-12 (8f, 2 65s), G O'Kelly-Lynch 2-1, R Cox 0-3, C Behan (2f) 0-2.	Report	P Crehan 1-2 (1f), O Long 1-1, K Dwyer 1-0, J Reddan, S Morrissey and L Reale 0-2 each, P Treacy and J Bergin 0-1 each.	Referee: J Connors (Donegal)

14 May 2016 Round 4	Lancashire	0-15 - 1-25	Sligo	Páirc na hÉireann, Solihull
14:30	P Duggan 0-7 (6fs), D Coughlan 0-3, T Goulding, N Unwin 0-2 each, S Tierney 0-1.	Report	K Raymond 0-9 (4fs), S Kenny 0-7, B O'Loughlin 0-3, M Gilmartin 1-0, R Cox, K Gilmartin 0-2 each, C Behan, M Davey, L Reidy 0-1 each.	Referee: K Brady (Louth)

14 May 2016 Round 4	Leitrim	1-12 - 0-16	Louth	Pairc Sean Mac Diarmada
14:30	G O'Hagan 1-2; C Cunniffe (3f) 0-4; P O'Donnell (2f) 0-2, Z Moradi, D McGovern, D Tiernan, J Ryan 0-1 each.	Report	L Dwan (4f) 0-8; D Murphy (1f 1'65) 0-4; P Lynch, R Maher, A McCrave, M Wallace 0-1 each.	Referee: J Connors (Donegal)

21 May 2016 Round 5	Sligo	1-22 - 2-5	Leitrim	Markievicz Park, Sligo
14:30	K Raymond 0-9 (7fs, 1 '65'), S Kenny 0-7 (2f), M Davey 1-0, B O'Loughlin 0-3, G O'Kelly-Lynch, K Gilmartin, C Behan (1f) 0-1 each.	Report	Z Moradi, P McWeeney 1-0 each, C Cunniffe 0-2 (1f), P O'Donnell, J Ryan, D McGovern 0-1 each.	Referee: R McGann (Clare)

21 May 2016 Round 5	Warwickshire	7-16 - 2-11	Lancashire	Páirc na hÉireann, Solihull
14:30

=== Final ===
4 June 2016
1.30 PM

Louth	4-15 – 4-11	Sligo
Dwan (1-4, 1-2f), Murphy (0-7, 6f, 1'65), Mackin (1-2), Callan, Conneely (1-1 each)		O'Kelly-Lynch (2-02), Davey, K. Gilmartin (1-0 each), Kenny (0-3, 1f), O'Loughlin (0-3), Raymond (0-2, 1f), Cox (0-1)

Croke Park, Dublin
Referee: Mick Murtagh (Westmeath)

GK	1	James Connolly (Naomh Moninne)
RCB	2	Conor Matthews (St Fechin's)
FB	3	Brian Minogue (Pearse Óg)
LCB	4	Mark Wallace (Knockbridge)
RHB	5	Mike Lyons (Pearse Óg)
CHB	6	Roger Maher (Doon, Limerick)
LHB	7	Andrew McCrave (Pearse Óg)
MF	8	Darren O'Hanrahan (Naomh Moninne)
MF	9	Shane Callan (Pearse Óg) (c)
RHF	10	Gerard Smyth (Pearse Óg)
CHF	11	Nigel Stanley (Galmoy, Kilkenny)
LHF	12	David Kettle (Knockbridge)
RCF	13	Diarmuid Murphy (Naomh Moninne)
FF	14	Liam Dwan (Holycross–Ballycahill, Tipperary)
LCF	15	Paddy Lynch (St Fechin's)
Substitutes:
	16	Niall Cafferkey (Naomh Moninne) for Matthews
	17	Andrew Mackin (Naomh Moninne) for Smyth
	18	Seaghan Conneely (St Fechin's) for O'Hanrahan
Manager:
Diarmuid McCarthy

GK	1	Niall McGrath (Burgess, Tipperary)
RCB	2	Ronan Redmond (Coolera/Strandhill)
FB	3	Jamie Kenny (Calry/St. Joseph's)
LCB	4	Gavin Feely (Tourlestrane)
RHB	5	Eoin Comerford (Coolera/Strandhill)
CHB	6	Cormac Behan (Croom, Limerick)
LHB	7	Liam Reidy (Calry/St. Joseph's)
MF	8	Ronan Cox (Calry/St. Joseph's)
MF	9	Keith Raymond (Calry/St. Joseph's) (c)
RHF	10	Kevin Gilmartin (Calry/St. Joseph's)
CHF	11	Gerard O'Kelly-Lynch (Naomh Eoin)
LHF	12	Brian O'Loughlin (Monageer-Boolavogue, Wexford)
RCF	13	Matthew Davey (Naomh Eoin)
FF	14	Ciarán Brennan (Calry/St. Joseph's)
LCF	15	Seán Kenny (HWH-Bunclody, Wexford)
Substitutes:
	16	Fabio Cretaro (Tubbercurry) for K. Gilmartin
	17	Michael Gilmartin (Calry/St. Joseph's) for Davey
	18	Aidan Morrison (Western Gaels) for O'Kelly-Lynch
Manager:
Declan Loughnane

== Miscellaneous ==
- Louth win their 1st championship in 39 years, last winning the 1977 All-Ireland Junior Hurling Championship.

== See also ==
- 2016 All-Ireland Senior Hurling Championship
- 2016 Ulster Senior Hurling Championship
- 2016 Christy Ring Cup
- 2016 Nicky Rackard Cup
