= Lory Meagher Cup =

Annual hurling competition

- Current season or competition: 2026 Lory Meagher Cup
- Code: Hurling
- Founded: 2009; 17 years ago
- Region: Ireland; Britain (GAA)
- Trophy: Lory Meagher Cup
- No. of teams: 6
- Title holders: Longford (3rd title)
- Most titles: Fermanagh, Longford, Louth (3 titles)
- TV partner: TG4
- Official website: Official website

The Lory Meagher Cup (Irish: Corn Labhraí Uí Mheachair; often referred to as the Meagher Cup) is an annual hurling competition organised by the Gaelic Athletic Association. The cup forms the fifth-tier of hurling for senior county teams (the All-Ireland Senior Hurling Championship is the first-tier trophy). It is contested by the six county teams ranked 31–36 in the All-Ireland Senior Hurling Championship. Each year, the champions of the Lory Meagher Cup are promoted to the Nicky Rackard Cup. The competition is named in honour of former Kilkenny hurler Lory Meagher who many regard as one of the greatest hurlers of all time.

The Lory Meagher Cup, which was introduced for the 2009 season, provides a championship for fifth tier teams deemed "too weak" for the fourth tier Nicky Rackard Cup.

The title has been won by 10 different counties, 5 of whom have won the title more than once. The all-time record-holders are Fermanagh, Longford and Louth, who have won the cup on 3 occasions. Longford are the current Lory Meagher Cup champions. They beat Leitrim by 1-18 to 1-13 in the 2026 final.

== History ==
=== Creation ===
Following the success of the Christy Ring Cup and Nicky Rackard Cup for the lower tier hurling teams, it was decided in 2008 to investigate the possibility of introducing a fourth tier. The Hurling Development Committee (HDC) proposed the new four-tier structure in place of the existing three-tier model. It, and the second and third-tier competitions, were to consist of eight teams. The proposals were accepted at a special GAA Congress in October 2008. Another second tier competition, the Joe McDonagh Cup, was added in 2018, moving the Lory Meagher Cup down into tier 5.

=== Team changes ===
12 county teams have participated in at least one edition of the Lory Meagher Cup. Fermanagh and Leitrim have participated in the most editions. South Down, although not an official county entered a team the first three seasons of the Cup but withdrew after 2011. New York became the most recent county to make their debut in the Cup in 2025.

=== Format history ===
==== Double elimination (2009–2011) ====
In 2009, a double elimination format was introduced, thus guaranteeing each team at least two games before being eliminated from the competition.

==== Group stage (2013–present) ====
Since 2013, a group stage has been included in the cup. The teams within the group stage has varied between 3 and 6 teams throughout the years.

=== Lory Meagher Cup moments ===
- Warwickshire 2-16 - 0-10 Longford (8 June 2013): Warwickshire became the first overseas team to win the Lory Meagher Cup. This match also saw history made with the first ever use of “Hawkeye” in a hurling match, Warwickshire's Sean Hennessey having a 65 yard free denied by the technology.
- Leitrim 2-23 - 2-22 Lancashire (22 June 2019): Leitrim won their first ever All-Ireland title, defeating Lancashire after extra time in Croke Park.

== Format ==
=== Group stage ===
Group stage: Six of the seven teams start at group stage (New York only enter from the semi-finals on, due to travel costs). During the course of a season (from May to June) each team plays the others once (a single round-robin system) for a total of five games. Teams receive two points for a win and one point for a draw. No points are awarded for a loss. Teams are ranked by total points. The first placed team in the group advance straight to the Lory Meagher Cup final while second place play New York (in Ireland) in the Lory Meagher Cup semi-final. The third, fourth, fifth and sixth-placed teams are eliminated from the championship.

==== Tie-breakers ====
In the event of teams finishing on equal points, the tie shall be decided by the following means (in the order specified):

- Where two teams only are involved – the outcome of the meeting of the two teams
- Score difference – subtracting the total "Scores Against" from the total "Scores For"
- Highest Total "Score For"
- Highest Total "Goals For"
- A Play-Off

=== Knockout stage ===
Final: The top two teams in the group stage contest the final. The winning team are declared champions.

The Lory Meagher has no direct entry route to compete in that year's All-Ireland Senior Hurling Championship.

=== Promotion ===
At the end of the championship, the winning team is promoted to the Nicky Rackard Cup for the following season.

=== Relegation ===
There is no relegation from the Lory Meagher Cup as it is the bottom of five tiers in the All-Ireland Senior Hurling Championship.

=== Group stage qualifications ===
Team	Qualification
1st in Group	Advance to Lory Meagher Cup Final
2nd in Group	Advance to Lory Meagher Cup Final
3rd in Group	
4th in Group
5th in Group
6th in Group

== Teams ==
=== 2026 Cup ===
Six counties will compete in the 2026 Lory Meagher Cup, with no team relegated last year from the Nicky Rackard Cup:

County	Location	Stadium	Province	Position in 2024 Championship	First year in Championship	In Championship since	Championship Titles	Last Championship Title
Cavan	Cavan	Breffni Park	Ulster	3rd	2009	2017	0	—
Lancashire	East Didsbury	Old Bedians	Britain	6th	2015	2022	0	—
Leitrim	Carrick-on-Shannon	Páirc Seán Mac Diarmada	Connacht	4th	2009	2022	1	2019
Longford	Longford	Pearse Park	Leinster	Runners-up	2009	2021	2	2014
Monaghan	Clones	St Tiernach's Park	Ulster	6th (Nicky Rackard Cup)	2009	2025	2	2023
Warwickshire	Solihull	Páirc na hÉireann	Britain	5th	2009	2023	2	2017

== List of finals ==
=== List of Lory Meagher Cup finals ===
Year	Date	Winners		Runners-up		Venue	Winning captain	Winning margin	Referee
Year	Date	County	Score	County	Score	Venue	Winning captain	Winning margin	Referee
2026	31 May	Longford	1-18	Leitrim	1-13	Croke Park, Dublin	Reuben Murray	5	Conor Daly (Kildare)
2025	31 May	New York	4-17 (29)	Cavan	2-17 (23)	Croke Park, Dublin	Jonathan Glynn	6	Kevin Parke (Antrim)
2024	2 June	Fermanagh	3-22 (31)	Longford	2-20 (26)	Croke Park, Dublin	Ryan Bogue	5	James Judge (Mayo)
2023	3 June	Monaghan	3-22 (31)	Lancashire	3-20 (29)	Croke Park, Dublin	Niall Garland & Kevin Crawley	2	Tarlach Conway (Derry)
2022	21 May	Louth	3-27 (36)	Longford	3-14 (23)	Croke Park, Dublin	Feidhleim Joyce	13	Caymon Flynn (Westmeath)
2021	31 July	Fermanagh	3-26 (35)	Cavan	1-17 (20)	Croke Park, Dublin	John Duffy	15	Michael Kennedy (Tipperary)
2020	28 Nov	Louth	2-19 (25)	Fermanagh	2-08 (14)	Croke Park, Dublin	Liam Molloy	11	Gearoid McGrath (Wexford)
2019	22 June	Leitrim	2-23 (29) AET	Lancashire	2-22 (28) AET	Croke Park, Dublin	Declan Molloy	1	Kevin Brady (Louth)
2018	23 June	Sligo	4-15 (27)	Lancashire	2-20 (26)	Croke Park, Dublin	Keith Raymond	1	Kevin McGenney (Roscommon)
2017	10 June	Warwickshire	0-17 (17)	Leitrim	0-11 (11)	Croke Park, Dublin	Donncha Kennedy	6	James Connors (Donegal)
2016	4 June	Louth	4-15 (27)	Sligo	4-11 (23)	Croke Park, Dublin	Shane Callan	4	Mick Murtagh (Westmeath)
2015	6 June	Fermanagh	3-16 (25)	Sligo	1-17 (20)	Croke Park, Dublin	John Paul McGarry	5	Colum Cunning (Antrim)
2014	7 June	Longford	3-18 (27)	Fermanagh	3-16 (25)	Croke Park, Dublin	Martin Coyle	2	James Clarke (Cavan)
2013	8 June	Warwickshire	2-16 (22)	Longford	0-10 (10)	Croke Park, Dublin	Conal Maskey	12	Liam McAuley (Antrim)
2012	9 June	Tyrone	2-24 (30)	Fermanagh	3-20 (29)	Croke Park, Dublin	Damian Maguire	1	Sean Cleere (Kilkenny)
2011	4 June	Donegal	2-12 (18)	Tyrone	0-17 (17)	Croke Park, Dublin	Colm Breathnach	1	Fergus Smith (Meath)
2010	3 July	Longford	1-20 (23)	Donegal	1-12 (15)	Croke Park, Dublin	Brendan Stakem	8	Ray Matthews (Antrim)
2009	11 July	Tyrone	5-11 (26)	Donegal	3-16 (25)	Croke Park, Dublin	Stephen Donnelly	1	Tony Carroll (Offaly)

== Roll of honour ==
=== Performances by county ===
County	Titles(s)	Runners-up	Years won	Years runners-up
Fermanagh	3	3	2015, 2021, 2024	2012, 2014, 2020,
Longford	3	3	2010, 2014, 2026	2013, 2022, 2024
Louth	3	0	2016, 2020, 2022	—
Tyrone	2	1	2009, 2012	2011
Warwickshire	2	0	2013, 2017	—
Donegal	1	2	2011	2009, 2010
Sligo	1	2	2018	2015, 2016
Leitrim	1	2	2019	2017, 2026
Monaghan	1	0	2023	—
New York	1	0	2025	—
Cavan	0	2	—	2021, 2025
Lancashire	0	3	—	2018, 2019, 2023

=== Performances by province ===
Division	Titles	Runners-up	Total
Ulster	7	7	14
Leinster	6	3	9
Connacht	2	4	6
Britain	2	3	5
United States	1	0	1

== Team records and statistics ==
Legend

- 1st – Champions
- 2nd – Runners-up
- SF/QF/R2 – Semi-finals/Quarter-finals/Round 2
- 3rd/4th/5th/6th – Group Stage
- CR – Christy Ring Cup
- NR – Nicky Rackard Cup
- — – Inactive

For each championship, the number of teams (in brackets) are shown

Team	2009 (8)	2010 (7)	2011 (7)	2012 (5)	2013 (4)	2014 (4)	2015 (5)	2016 (5)	2017 (6)	2018 (4)	2019 (4)	2020 (3)	2021 (5)	2022 (6)	2023 (6)	2024 (6)	2025 (7)	2026 (6)	Years
Cavan	R2	QF	—	—	—	—	—	—	5th	3rd	4th	3rd	2nd	6th	3rd	3rd	2nd	5th	11
Donegal	2nd	2nd	1st	NR	NR	NR	NR	NR	NR	NR	CR	NR	NR	NR	NR	NR	CR	CR	3
Fermanagh	QF	SF	QF	2nd	3rd	2nd	1st	NR	6th	4th	3rd	2nd	1st	NR	NR	1st	NR	NR	13
Lancashire	—	—	—	—	—	—	5th	5th	4th	2nd	2nd	—	—	5th	2nd	6th	5th	6th	9
Leitrim	QF	SF	R2	SF	4th	4th	3rd	4th	2nd	NR	1st	NR	NR	3rd	5th	4th	4th	2nd	14
Longford	SF	1st	QF	R3	2nd	1st	NR	NR	NR	NR	NR	NR	SF	2nd	4th	2nd	3rd	1st	11
Louth	NR	NR	NR	NR	NR	NR	NR	1st	NR	NR	NR	1st	SF	1st	NR	NR	NR	NR	4
Monaghan	NR	NR	NR	NR	NR	NR	NR	NR	NR	NR	NR	NR	QF	4th	1st	NR	SF	3rd	4
New York	—	—	—	—	—	—	—	—	—	—	—	—	—	—	—	—	1st	NR	1
Sligo	NR	NR	NR	NR	NR	NR	2nd	2nd	3rd	1st	NR	CR	CR	CR	CR	CR	NR	NR	4
South Down	SF	R2	SF	—	—	—	—	—	—	—	—	—	—	—	—	—	—	—	3
Tyrone	1st	NR	2nd	1st	NR	NR	NR	NR	NR	NR	NR	NR	NR	NR	CR	CR	CR	NR	3
Warwickshire	R2	QF	SF	SF	1st	3rd	4th	3rd	1st	NR	NR	—	—	NR	6th	5th	6th	4th	12

=== Debut of teams ===
Year	Debutants	Total
2009	Cavan, Donegal, Fermanagh, Leitrim, Longford, South Down, Tyrone, Warwickshire	8
2010–2014	None	0
2015	Lancashire, Sligo	2
2016	Louth	1
2017–2020	None	0
2021	Monaghan	1
2022–2024	None	0
2025	New York	1
2026	None	0
2027	Armagh	1
**Total**		**14**

=== Seasons in Lory Meagher Cup ===
The number of years that each county has played in the Lory Meagher Cup between 2009 and 2026. A total of 13 counties have competed in at least one season of the Lory Meagher Cup. Leitrim have participated in the most championships. The counties in bold participate in the 2026 Lory Meagher Cup.

Years	Counties
15	**Leitrim**
13	Fermanagh, **Warwickshire**
12	**Cavan**, **Longford**
10	**Lancashire**
5	**Monaghan**
4	Louth, Sligo
3	Donegal, South Down, Tyrone
1	New York

=== List of Lory Meagher Cup counties ===
The following teams have competed in the Lory Meagher Cup for at least one season.

County	Appearances	Debut	Most recent	Championship titles	Last Championship title	Best Lory Meagher Cup result
Cavan	12	2009	2026	0	—	2nd
Donegal	3	2009	2011	1	2011	**1st**
Fermanagh	13	2009	2024	3	2024	**1st**
Lancashire	10	2015	2026	0	—	2nd
Leitrim	15	2009	2026	1	2019	**1st**
Longford	12	2009	2026	2	2014	**1st**
Louth	4	2016	2022	3	2022	**1st**
Monaghan	5	2021	2026	0	2023	**1st**
New York	1	2025	2025	1	2025	**1st**
Sligo	4	2015	2018	1	2018	**1st**
South Down	3	2009	2011	0	—	Semi-finals
Tyrone	3	2009	2012	1	2012	**1st**
Warwickshire	12	2009	2026	2	2017	**1st**

=== All-time table ===
Legend

Colours
Currently competing in the Christy Ring Cup
Currently competing in the Nicky Rackard Cup
Currently competing in the Lory Meagher Cup

As of 20 May 2025 (After 2025 group stage).

Ranking	Team	Pld	W	D	L	Points	P.P.G.
1	Longford	45	23	6	16	52	1.15
2	Fermanagh	47	22	6	19	50	1.06
3	Leitrim	56	22	2	32	46	0.82
4	Warwickshire	47	22	1	24	45	0.95
5	Cavan	41	13	4	24	30	0.73
6	Monaghan	20	11	3	6	25	1.25
7	Louth	17	12	0	5	24	1.41
8	Sligo	19	12	0	7	24	1.26
9	Lancashire	42	11	0	31	22	0.52
10	Tyrone	12	10	0	2	20	1.66
11	Donegal	13	10	0	3	20	1.53
12	South Down	9	4	0	5	8	0.88
13	New York	2	2	0	0	4	2.00

=== By Semi-Final/Top 4 Appearances ===
Team	No.	Years
Leitrim	11	2010, 2012, 2013, 2014, 2015, 2016, 2017, 2019, 2022, 2024, 2026
Fermanagh	10	2010, 2012, 2013, 2014, 2015, 2018, 2019, 2020, 2021, 2024
Longford	10	2009, 2010, 2013, 2014, 2021, 2022, 2023, 2024, 2025, 2026
Warwickshire	8	2011, 2012, 2013, 2014, 2015, 2016, 2017, 2026
Cavan	7	2018, 2019, 2020, 2021, 2023, 2024, 2025
Sligo	4	2015, 2016, 2017, 2018
Louth	4	2016, 2020, 2021, 2022
Lancashire	4	2017, 2018, 2019, 2023
Monaghan	4	2022, 2023, 2025, 2026
Donegal	3	2009, 2010, 2011
Tyrone	3	2009, 2011, 2012
South Down	2	2009, 2011
New York	1	2025

=== By decade ===
The most successful team of each decade, judged by number of Lory Meagher Cup titles, is as follows:

- 2000s: 1 for Tyrone (2009)
- 2010s: 2 each for Longford (2010, 2014) and Warwickshire (2013, 2017)
- 2020s: 2 each for Louth (2020, 2022) and Fermanagh (2021, 2024)

=== Match records ===
- Most matches played
  - 56, Leitrim
- Most wins
  - 23, Longford
- Most losses
  - 32, Leitrim
- Most draws
  - 6, Fermanagh
  - 6, Longford

=== Other records ===
==== Finishing positions ====
- Most championships
  - 3, Louth (2016, 2020, 2022)
  - 3, Fermanagh (2015, 2021, 2024)
  - 3, Longford (2010, 2014, 2026)
- Most second-place finishes
  - 3, Fermanagh (2012, 2014, 2020)
  - 3, Lancashire (2018, 2019, 2023)
  - 3, Longford (2013, 2022, 2024)
- Most third-place finishes
  - 4, Cavan (2018, 2020, 2023, 2024)
- Most fourth-place finishes
  - 5, Leitrim (2013, 2014, 2016, 2024, 2025)
- Most fifth-place finishes
  - 4, Lancashire (2015, 2016, 2022, 2025)
- Most sixth-place finishes
  - 2, Warwickshire (2023, 2025)
- Most semi-final finishes
  - 2, Leitrim (2010, 2012)
  - 2, Longford (2009, 2021)
  - 2, South Down (2009, 2011)
  - 2, Warwickshire (2011, 2012)
- Most quarter-final finishes
  - 2, Fermanagh (2009, 2011)
- Most round 2 or round 3 finishes
  - 1, Cavan (2009)
  - 1, Leitrim (2011)
  - 1, Longford (2012)
  - 1, South Down (2010)
  - 1, Warwickshire (2009)

==== Unbeaten sides ====
- 6 teams have won the Lory Meagher Cup unbeaten:
  - Donegal had 4 wins in 2011
  - Tyrone had 3 wins in 2012
  - Warwickshire had 3 wins and 1 draw in 2013
  - Longford had 3 wins and 1 draw in 2014
  - Louth had 5 wins in 2016
  - Warwickshire had 6 wins in 2017
  - Fermanagh had 4 wins and 2 draws in 2024

==== Beaten sides ====
The group stage of the cup has resulted in 9 'back-door' Lory Meagher Cup champions:

- Tyrone (2009) were beaten by South Down in round 1.
- Longford (2010) were beaten by Donegal in round 1.
- Fermanagh (2015) were beaten by Sligo in round 5.
- Sligo (2018) were beaten by Cavan in round 3.
- Leitrim (2019) were beaten by Lancashire in round 1.
- Louth (2020) were beaten by Fermanagh in round 1.
- Fermanagh (2021) were beaten by Cavan in round 1.
- Louth (2022) were beaten by Monaghan in round 2 and Longford in round 3.
- Monaghan (2023) were beaten by Cavan in round 2.

On 2 occasions a team was defeated twice but have remained in the championship:

- Louth (2022) were beaten by Monaghan and Longford but still qualified for the final.
- Lancashire (2023) were beaten by Cavan and by Monaghan but still qualified for the final.

==== Final success rate ====
Only two counties have appeared in the final more than once, being victorious on all occasions:

- Louth
- Warwickshire

On the opposite end of the scale, only one county has appeared in the final more than once, losing on each occasion:

- Lancashire

==== Consecutive participations ====
- 9, Leitrim (2009–2017)
- 9, Warwickshire (2009–2017)

Leitrim and Warwickshire have the record number of consecutive participations in the Lory Meagher Cup, taking part in 9 seasons.

==== Winning other trophies ====
Although not an officially recognised achievement, no team have ever achieved the distinction of winning the Lory Meagher Cup and their respective Division in the National Hurling League.

==== Biggest wins ====
- The most one sided finals:
  - **15 points** – 2021: Fermanagh 3-26 - 1-17 Cavan
  - **13 points** – 2022: Louth 3-27 - 3-14 Longford
  - **12 points** – 2013: Warwickshire 2-16 - 0-10 Longford
  - **11 points** – 2020: Louth 2-19 - 2-08 Fermanagh
  - **8 points** – 2010: Longford 1-20 - 1-12 Donegal
- The most one sided other matches:
  - **29 points** – 2011: South Down 4-25 - 0-08 Leitrim

==== Scoring Events ====
- Most goals in a match:
  - **11** – 2021: Longford 8-25 - 3-19 Louth
- Most points in a match:
  - **46** – 2024: Lancashire 0-21 - 2-25 Cavan
  - **46** – 2024: Lancashire 2-24 - 6-22 Warwickshire
  - **46** – 2025: Longford 3-17 - 3-29 Cavan
- Most goals by one team in a match:
  - **8** – 2021: Longford 8-25 - 3-19 Louth
- Most points by one team in a match:
  - **32** – 2025: Warwickshire 1-11 - 4-32 Cavan
- Highest aggregate score:
  - **77** – 2021: Longford 8-25 - 3-19 Louth
- Lowest aggregate score:
  - **20** – 2023: Leitrim 0-08 - 0-12 Longford

==== Successful defending ====
Only three teams were able to defend their title the following year. None of these teams were able to do so. These are:

- Longford on 0 attempts out of 1 (2011)
- Warwickshire on 0 attempts out of 1 (2014)
- Louth on 0 attempts out of 1 (2021)

Usually defending champions are promoted and a number of teams survived the first year of the Nicky Rackard Cup. These are:

- 00 on 00 attempts out of 00 (0000)

==== Gaps ====
- Longest gaps between successive cup titles:
  - 6 years: Fermanagh (2015–2021)
- Longest gaps between successive Lory Meagher Cup final appearances:
  - 8 years: Longford (2014–2022)
  - 7 years: Leitrim (2019–2026)
- Longest gap between successive championship appearances
  - 7 years: Cavan (2010–2017)
  - 7 years: Longford (2014–2021)

==== Active gaps ====
- Longest active gaps between since last title:
  - 15 years: Donegal (2011–)
  - 14 years: Tyrone (2012–)
  - 12 years: Longford (2014–)
  - 9 years: Warwickshire (2017–)
  - 8 years: Sligo (2018–)
  - 7 years: Leitrim (2019–)
  - 4 years: Louth (2022–)
  - 3 years: Monaghan (2023–)
  - 2 years: Fermanagh (2024–)
  - 1 year: New York (2025–)
- Longest active gaps since last cup final appearance:
  - 15 years: Donegal (2011–)
  - 14 years: Tyrone (2012–)
  - 9 years: Warwickshire (2017–)
  - 8 years: Sligo (2018–)
  - 4 years: Louth (2022–)
  - 3 years: Lancashire (2023–)
  - 3 years: Monaghan (2023–)
  - 2 years: Fermanagh (2024–)
  - 2 years: Longford (2024–)
  - 1 year: Cavan (2025–)
  - 1 year: New York (2025–)
  - 0 years: Leitrim (2026–)
- Longest active gap since last cup appearance
  - 14 years: Donegal (2011–)
  - 14 years: South Down (2011–)

==== Provinces ====
- Only on 5 occasions has the Lory Meagher Cup final involved two teams from the same province:
  - Tyrone vs Donegal (2009)
  - Donegal vs Tyrone (2011)
  - Tyrone vs Fermanagh (2012)
  - Fermanagh vs Cavan (2021)
  - Louth vs Longford (2022)
- The province providing the highest number of different winning teams is Ulster, with four:
  - Donegal
  - Fermanagh
  - Monaghan
  - Tyrone
- Province success rates
  - Ulster 44% (4 out of 9 counties)
  - Connacht 40% (2 out of 5 counties)
  - Britain 33% (1 out of 3 counties)
  - Leinster 17% (2 out of 12 counties)
  - Munster 0% (0 out of 6 counties)

==== Lory Meagher Cup final pairings ====
Pairing	Meetings	First meeting	Last meeting
Donegal v Tyrone	2	2009	2011
Fermanagh v Longford	2	2014	2024
Cavan v Fermanagh	1	2021	
Cavan v New York	1	2025	
Donegal v Longford	1	2010	
Fermanagh v Sligo	1	2015	
Fermanagh v Tyrone	1	2012	
Fermanagh v Louth	1	2020	
Lancashire v Leitrim	1	2019	
Lancashire v Monaghan	1	2023	
Lancashire v Sligo	1	2018	
Leitrim v Warwickshire	1	2017	
Longford v Louth	1	2022	
Longford v Warwickshire	1	2013	
Louth v Sligo	1	2016	

==== Longest undefeated run ====
The record for the longest unbeaten run stands at 7 games held by Tyrone (2009–2011).

==== Miscellaneous ====
- Best finish by a debuting team
  - Champions, Tyrone (2009)
- Best finish by a debuting team (after 2009)
  - Champions, Louth (2016)
- Highest winning record
  - 83%, Tyrone (10 wins in 12 matches)
- Lowest winning record
  - 26%, Cavan (9 wins in 35 matches)
- Most played match
  - Fermanagh vs Leitrim

== See also ==
- All-Ireland Senior Hurling Championship (Tier 1)
- Joe McDonagh Cup (Tier 2)
- Christy Ring Cup (Tier 3)
- Nicky Rackard Cup (Tier 4)
