= 2010 Lory Meagher Cup =

Hurling competition

- Dates: 5 June – 3 July 2010
- Teams: 7
- Champions: Longford; Brendan Stakeum (captain); Tom Lynam (manager)
- Runners-up: Donegal; Colm Breathnach (captain); Andrew Wallace (manager)

Tournament statistics
- Matches played: 11
- Goals scored: 31 (2.82 per match)
- Points scored: 318 (28.91 per match)

The 2010 Lory Meagher Cup is the second edition of the Lory Meagher Cup since its establishment by the Gaelic Athletic Association in 2009 and is the fourth-tier of Hurling for senior county teams (the All-Ireland Senior Hurling Championship is the first-tier trophy). It is contested by eight GAA county teams ranked 30–36 in the 2010 All-Ireland Senior Hurling Championship.

The teams competing were Cavan, Donegal, Fermanagh, Leitrim, Longford, South Down, and Warwickshire. The 2009 champions, Tyrone were promoted to the 2010 Nicky Rackard Cup, and did not have the opportunity to defend their title. Due to a disagreement over promotion and relegation from the All-Ireland series, no team was relegated from the 2009 Nicky Rackard Cup for the 2010 season.

== Format ==
The tournament had a double elimination format - each team played at least two games before being knocked out.

- One team got a bye to Round 2A.
- The other six teams played three Round 1 matches.
  - The winners in Round 1 advanced to Round 2A.
  - Two of the Round 1 losers went into Round 2B; one got a bye to the quarter-finals.
- There were two Round 2A matches.
  - The winners in Round 2A advanced to the semi-finals.
  - The losers in Round 2A went into the quarter-finals.
- There was one Round 2B match.
  - The winner in Round 2B advanced to the quarter-finals.
  - The loser in Round 2B was eliminated.
- There were two quarter-final matches between the Round 2A losers, the Round 2B winner and the Round 1 loser which got a bye.
  - The winners of the quarter-finals advanced to the semi-finals.
  - The losers of the quarter-finals were eliminated.
- There were two semi-final matches between the Round 2A winners and the quarter-final winners.
  - The winners of the semi-finals advanced to the final.
  - The losers of the semi-finals were eliminated.
- The winners of the final won the Lory Meagher Cup for 2010.

== Team changes ==
=== To Championship ===
Relegated from the Nicky Rackard Cup

- None

=== From Championship ===
Promoted to the Nicky Rackard Cup

- Tyrone

== Teams ==
County	Last Provincial Title	Last All-Ireland Title	Position in 2009 Championship	Appearance
Cavan	—	—	Round 2	2nd
Donegal	1932	—	Runners-up	2nd
Fermanagh	—	—	Quarter-finals	2nd
Leitrim	—	—	Quarter-finals	2nd
Longford	—	—	Semi-finals	2nd
South Down	—	—	Semi-finals	2nd
Warwickshire	—	—	Round 2	2nd

== Bracket ==
Round 1 Round 2B
South Down	1-12
Leitrim	1-13
South Down	1-13
Longford	5-13
Donegal	3-13
Longford	1-15
Warwickshire	2-17
Fermanagh	1-08

Round 2A; Quarter-finals
Cavan	1-14
Leitrim	2-14
Warwickshire	2-12
Longford	2-22
Fermanagh	0-19
Cavan	1-07
Donegal	0-21
Warwickshire	2-09

Semi-finals
Leitrim	0-10
Longford	2-21
Fermanagh	1-11
Donegal	1-22

Final
Longford	1-20
Donegal	1-12

== Round 1 ==
5 June 2010
Round 1

Leitrim	1-13 - 1-12	South Down
I Bermingham 0-11, L Burns 1-0, D McGovern, D Ponaird 0-1 each	Report	P O'Neill 0-7, L Deegan 1-0, P Sheehan 0-2, J McGrath, A Brown, E Donnelly 0-1 each

Carrick-on-Shannon
Referee: A. Kelly (Galway)

5 June 2010
Round 1

Donegal	3-13 - 1-15	Longford
D Cullen 0-6, M McGhee 2-0, E McDermott 1-2, L Henderson 0-4, M Patton 0-1	Report	G Ghee 1-8, J O'Brien 0-3, C Egan 0-2, E Donnellan, R Ryland 0-1 each

Letterkenny
Referee: M. Mulholland (Derry)

5 June 2010
Round 1

Warwickshire	2-17 - 1-08	Fermanagh
J Healy 2-2, M Lyons 0-6, S Brough 0-4, P Breen, B Cousins 0-2 each, N Morris 0-1	Report	R Bogue 0-5, P McGoldrick 1-0, S Corrigan 0-3

Solihull
Referee: G. Devlin (Armagh)

== Round 2 ==
=== Round 2A ===
12 June 2010
Round 2A

Donegal	0-21- 2-09	Warwickshire
L Henderson 0-7, J Donnelly 0-3, N Campbell, M McCann, S McVeigh, E McDermott, S'Boyle 0-2 each, M McGhee 0-1	Report	K Codd 2-1, D Kelly 0-3, S O'Hanlon 0-2, P Breen, T Walsh, N Ewing 0-1 each

Letterkenny
Referee: E. Hassan (Derry)

12 June 2010
Round 2A

Cavan	1-14 - 2-14	Leitrim
B Gaffney 0-6, S Og Brady 1-1, R O'Hagan, C Brennan 0-2 each, E Hill, G Brennan, B Harten 0-1 each	Report	K Bermingham 0-5, L Burns, C Burns 1-1 each, C Cunniffe 0-3, D McGovern, K Connolly 0-2 each

Breffni Park, Cavan
Referee: J. O'Rourke (Monaghan)

=== Round 2B ===
12 June 2010
Round 2B

Longford	5-13 - 1-13	South Down
J O'Brien 4-1, G Ghee 0-8, E Daly 1-0, D Tanner 0-3, N Casey 0-1	Report	P O'Neill 1-8, K Courtney 0-3, P Sheehan, L Deegans 0-1 each

Pearse Park, Longford
Referee: T. Carroll (Offaly)

== Quarter-finals ==
19 June 2010
Quarter-final

Fermanagh	0-19 - 1-07	Cavan
P McGoldrick 0-13, S Corr 0-3; C McManus, R Bogue, M Teague 0-1 each	Report	K Downes 0-5, J Rosney 1-0, L Kelly, G Brennan 0-1 each

Brewster Park
Referee: E. Hassan (Derry)

19 June 2010
Quarter-final

Warwickshire	2-12 - 2-22	Longford
K Codd 2-5, M Lyons 0-4, S O'Hanlon, D Kelly, T Walsh 0-1 each	Report	G Ghee 1-12, J O'Brien 1-6, N Casey 0-2, C Egan, D Tanner 0-1 each

Solihull
Referee: P. Casey (Waterford)

== Semi-finals ==
26 June 2010
Semi-final

Leitrim	0-10 - 2-21	Longford
K Connolly, C Cunniffe 0-2 each, L Burns, D Poniard, M Quinn, M Poniard, D McGovern, C Burns 0-1 each	Report	G Ghee 1-12, N Casey 1-3, J O'Brien 0-3, D Tanner 0-2, S Stakelum 0-1

Pearse Park, Longford
Referee: P. Green (Galway)

26 June 2010
Semi-final

Donegal	1-22 - 1-11	Fermanagh
L Henderson 0-10, S McVeigh 2-0, D Cullen, K Campbell 0-3 each, S Boyle, N Campbell 0-2 each, M McCann, E McDermott 0-1 each	Report	P McGoldrick 1-5, J Duffy 0-5, R Bogue 0-1

Omagh
Referee: A. Kelly (Galway)

== Final ==
3 July 2010
Final

Longford	1-20 - 1-12	Donegal
G Ghee 1-9, E Donnellan, D Tanner 0-2 each, J O'Brien 0-3, J Newman, F Daly, S Stakelum, J Minnock 0-1 each	Report	L Henderson 0-5, D Cullen 0-4, P Hannigan 1-0, E McDermott, M McCann, N Campbell 0-1 each

Croke Park, Dublin
Referee: R. Mathews (Antrim)

== Statistics ==
=== Top scorers ===
==== Overall ====
Rank	Player	County	Tally	Total	Matches	Average
1	Garrett Ghee	Longford	4-49	61	5	12.20
2	Joe O'Brien	Longford	5-16	31	5	6.20
3	Lee Henderson	Donegal	0-26	26	4	6.50
4	Paul McGoldrick	Fermanagh	1-21	24	3	8.00
5	Kevin Codd	Warwickshire	4-6	18	2	9.00
5	Paul O'Neill	South Down	1-15	18	2	9.00

==== Single game ====
Rank	Player	County	Tally	Total	Opposition
1	Garrett Ghee	Longford	1-12	15	Warwickshire
1	Garrett Ghee	Longford	1-12	15	Leitrim
3	Joe O'Brien	Longford	4-1	13	South Down
3	Paul McGoldrick	Fermanagh	0-13	13	Cavan
5	Garrett Ghee	Longford	1-9	12	Donegal
6	Kevin Codd	Warwickshire	2-5	11	Longford
6	Paul O'Neill	South Down	1-8	11	Longford
6	Garrett Ghee	Longford	1-8	11	Donegal
6	Ian Bermingham	Leitrim	0-11	11	South Down
10	Lee Henderson	Donegal	0-10	10	Fermanagh

=== Scoring events ===
- First hat-trick of the competition: J O'Brien for Longford against South Down
- Widest winning margin: 17 points
  - Longford 2-21 - 0-10 Leitrim (Semi-final)
- Most goals in a match: 6
  - Longford 5-13 - 1-13 South Down (Round 2B)
- Most points in a match: 34
  - Longford 2-22 - 2-12 Warwickshire (Quarter-final)
- Most goals by one team in a match: 5
  - Longford 5-13 - 1-13 South Down (Round 2B)
- Most goals scored by a losing team: 2
  - Warwickshire 2-12 - 2-22 Longford (Quarter-final)
  - Warwickshire 2-09 - 0-21 Donegal (Round 2A)
- Most points scored by a losing team: 15
  - Longford 1-15 - 3-13 Donegal (Round 1)
- Most points by one team in a match: 22
  - Fermanagh 1-11 - 1-22 Donegal (Semi-final)
  - Warwickshire 2-12 - 2-22 Longford (Quarter-final)
- Highest aggregate score: 46 points
  - Warwickshire 2-12 - 2-22 Longford (Quarter-final)
- Lowest aggregate score: 29 points
  - Fermanagh 0-19 - 1-07 Cavan (Quarter-final)

== Miscellaneous ==
- Longford won their first ever national championship
- Longford become the first county from Leinster to win the Lory Meagher Cup

== See also ==
- 2010 All-Ireland Senior Hurling Championship
- 2010 Ulster Senior Hurling Championship
- 2010 Christy Ring Cup
- 2010 Nicky Rackard Cup
