= 2019 Lory Meagher Cup =

Hurling competition

- Dates: 18 May 2019 – 22 June 2019
- Teams: 4
- Champions: Leitrim (1st Title); Declan Molloy (captain); Martin Cunniffe (manager)
- Runners-up: Lancashire; Greg Jacob (captain); Stan Murray-Hession (manager)
- Promoted: Leitrim

Tournament statistics
- Matches played: 7
- Goals scored: 14 (2 per match)
- Points scored: 237 (33.86 per match)

The 2019 Lory Meagher Cup was the eleventh edition of the Lory Meagher Cup since its establishment by the Gaelic Athletic Association in 2009 and is the fifth-tier of Hurling for senior county teams (the All-Ireland Senior Hurling Championship is the first-tier trophy). It is contested by four GAA county teams ranked 32–35 in the 2019 All-Ireland Senior Hurling Championship. The draw for the 2019 fixtures took place on 24 October 2018.

== Team changes ==
=== To Championship ===
Relegated from the Nicky Rackard Cup

- Leitrim

=== From Championship ===
Promoted to the Nicky Rackard Cup

- Sligo

== Group stage ==
=== Table ===
Pos	Team	Pld	W	D	L	SF	SA	Diff	Pts	Qualification
1	Lancashire	3	2	0	1	64	47	17	4	Advance to Final
2	Leitrim	3	2	0	1	61	55	6	4	Advance to Final
3	Fermanagh	3	2	0	1	57	53	4	4	
4	Cavan	3	0	0	3	40	67	-27	0	

=== Round 1 ===
18 May 2019 Round 1	Lancashire	0-20 - 1-15	Leitrim

18 May 2019 Round 1	Cavan	1-11 - 0-19	Fermanagh

=== Round 2 ===
25 May 2019 Round 2	Fermanagh	2-13 - 0-15	Lancashire

25 May 2019 Round 2	Leitrim	1-16 - 0-16	Cavan

=== Round 3 ===
8 June 2019 Round 3	Leitrim	2-18 - 1-16	Fermanagh
1:00 pm

8 June 2019 Round 3	Cavan	1-07 - 1-26	Lancashire
1:00 pm

== Final ==
22 June 2019	Lancashire	2–22 — 2–23	Leitrim	Croke Park, Dublin
12:00	Ronan Crowley 1-9 (4f), Patrick Duggan 1-1, Darren Crowley 0-4, Edmond Kenny 0-2, Trevor Lee 0-2, Tommy Maher 0-2, Conor Duggan 0-1, JJ Dunphy 0-1	Report	Gavin O’Hagan 0-9 (6f, 1 pen), Colm Moreton 1-4, James Glancy 1-0, Glement Cunniffe 0-3, Adam Byrne 0-2, Zak Moradi 0-1, Ben Murray 0-1, Liam Moreton 0-1, Karl McDermott 0-1, Enda Moreton 0-1	Referee: Kevin Brady (Louth)

Leitrim are promoted to the 2020 Nicky Rackard Cup.

== Statistics ==
=== Scoring events ===
- Widest winning margin: 00 points
  - 000 vs 000 (000)
- Most goals in a match: 00
  - 000 vs 000 (000)
- Most points in a match: 00
  - 000 vs 000 (000)
- Most goals by one team in a match: 00
  - 000 vs 000 (000)
- Most points by one team in a match: 00
  - 000 vs 000 (000)
- Highest aggregate score: 00 points
  - 000 vs 000 (000)
- Lowest aggregate score: 00 points
  - 000 vs 000 (000)

== Miscellaneous ==
- Leitrim won their 1st championship in 43 years, last winning the 1976 Connacht Junior Hurling Championship
- It was also their first ever national championship

== See also ==
- 2019 All-Ireland Senior Hurling Championship
- 2019 Leinster Senior Hurling Championship
- 2019 Munster Senior Hurling Championship
- 2019 Joe McDonagh Cup
- 2019 Christy Ring Cup
- 2019 Nicky Rackard Cup
