= Cavan county hurling team =

Irish hurling team

Cavan
- Sport: Hurling
- Irish: An Cabhán
- Nickname(s): The Breffni men The Breffni Blues
- County board: Cavan GAA
- Manager: Ollie Bellew
- Captain: Matthew Hynes
- Home venue(s): Breffni Park, Cavan

Recent competitive record
- Current All-Ireland status: Lory Meagher Cup; Group stage in 2022
- Current NHL Division: 3B
First colours	Second colours

The Cavan county hurling team represents Cavan in hurling and is governed by Cavan GAA, the county board of the Gaelic Athletic Association. The team competes in the Lory Meagher Cup and the National Hurling League.

Cavan's home ground is Breffni Park, Cavan. The team's manager is Ollie Bellew.

== History ==
=== 1908–2011 ===
Cavan represented Ulster in the semi-final of the 1908 All-Ireland Senior Hurling Championship, but lost the delayed Ulster final to Derry. Cavan reached the Ulster final six times, but never won the competition. Cavan won the Ulster Junior Hurling Championship in 1983 and 1985, as well as Division 4 of the National Hurling League in 1983.

After an extended period of poor results, on 26 April 2011, Cavan announced that they would withdraw from Senior hurling for the foreseeable future, citing poor attendance at training and lack of numbers. This left Cavan as the only county in Ireland without a senior hurling team. In the next few years, the county board focused on developing hurling at underage level.

=== 2017–present ===
After six years without fielding a team, Cavan played in the Lory Meagher Cup in 2017. Cavan re-entered the National Hurling League in 2018, competing in Division 3B.

Cavan reached the final of the Lory Meagher Cup for the first time in 2021 after a win over Louth. The final took place in Croke Park on 31 July 2021, with Cavan facing Fermanagh. Fermanagh won the match by 3–26 to 1–17. Cavan topped the Division 3B table in 2023, reaching the final for the first time. Cavan claimed their first silverware since the reformation of the team, with a 0–17 to 0–16 win over Leitrim.

== Panel ==
Team as per Cavan vs Leitrim in the NHL Division 3B Final, 1 April 2023

No.	Player	Position	Club
1	Darren Sheridan	Goalkeeper	Mullahoran St Joseph's
2	Shane Briody	Right corner back	Pearse Óg
3	Dominic Crudden	Full back	Mullahoran St Joseph's
4	Liam Óg Cooke	Left corner back	Pearse Óg
5	Jack Barry	Right half back	East Cavan Gaels
6	Cillian Sheanon	Centre back	Cuala
7	Matthew Hynes (c)	Left half back	Mullahoran St Joseph's
8	Dillon Mulligan	Midfield	Kilmacud Crokes
9	Nicky Kenny	Midfield	East Cavan Gaels
10	Tom Leonard	Right half forward	Cootehill Celtic
11	Canice Maher	Centre forward	East Cavan Gaels
12	Colum Sheanon	Left half forward	Cuala
17	Sean Keating	Right corner forward	Pearse Óg
14	Diarmaid Carney	Full forward	Cootehill Celtic
15	Colin Gargan	Left corner forward	East Cavan Gaels

No.	Player	Position	Club
16	Niall Clerkin	Substitute	Cootehill Celtic
13	Philip McCabe	Substitute	Cootehill Celtic
18	Caolan Kelly	Substitute	Mullahoran St Joseph's
19	Rian Delaney	Substitute	Cootehill Celtic
20	Anthony Sheridan	Substitute	Mullahoran St Joseph's
21	Fiachra Hughes	Substitute	Cootehill Celtic
22	Tadhg Barry	Substitute	East Cavan Gaels
23	Rory Farrell	Substitute	East Cavan Gaels
24	Mark Moffett	Substitute	Cootehill Celtic
25	Gavin Fitzpatrick	Substitute	Cootehill Celtic
26	Caoimhín Carney	Substitute	Cootehill Celtic

== Management team ==
- Manager: Ollie Bellew
- Selector: Tomás Mannion

== Managerial history ==
Name	Origin	Years
Tom "Gawney" Walsh	Wexford	c. 2000s
John Hunt	Clare	2009
?	?	Until 2017
Dinny Cahill	Tipperary	2017
Michael Carr	Galway	2018–19
Ollie Bellew	Antrim	2020–21
Neil Cole	Meath	2022
Ollie Bellew (2)	Antrim	2023–

== Honours ==
=== National ===
- Lory Meagher Cup
  - (silver) Runners-up (1): 2021
- National Hurling League Division 3B
  - (gold) Winners (1): 2023
- National Hurling League Division 4
  - (gold) Winners (1): 1983

=== Provincial ===
- Ulster Senior Hurling Championship
  - (silver) Runners-up (6): 1908, 1926, 1927, 1928, 1935, 1936
- Ulster Junior Hurling Championship
  - (gold) Winners (2): 1983, 1985
  - (silver) Runners-up (2): 1988, 1994
