= Páirc na hÉireann =

Sports venue in Solihull, England

- Location within West Midlands county
- Location: Solihull, West Midlands, England
- Coordinates: 52.433°N 1.731°W
- Public transit: Birmingham International railway station
- Owner: Warwickshire GAA; Britain GAA
- Surface: Grass

Páirc na hÉireann, near Bickenhill, Solihull, England, is the principal Gaelic games sports facility in the West Midlands. It is administered by the Warwickshire GAA. Páirc na hÉireann is located east of Birmingham near Birmingham Airport. It is currently the home grounds of Britain GAA.

== Facilities ==
Páirc na hÉireann consists of three full-size Gaelic Athletic Association pitches with eight changing rooms, bar area and car-parking.

The address is: Pairc Na hÉireann, Catherine de Barnes Lane, Solihull, B92 0DB.

== Use ==
Páirc na hÉireann has hosted numerous Warwickshire Gaelic football and hurling matches as well as the provincial knockout championships and the British University Gaelic football Championships. Most recently, with the entry of Warwickshire's hurling team into the Lory Meagher Cup and the Leinster Junior Shield, it also regularly hosts hurling teams from Ireland. The future of the ground was in question due to plans to drive a motorway through its middle.
