= Pearse Park (Longford) =

Gaelic sports stadium in Longford, Ireland

- Páirc an Phiarsaigh
- Interactive map of Pearse Park
- Full name: Glennon Brothers Pearse Park
- Location: Lisbrack, Longford, N39 VY28, Ireland
- Coordinates: 53°44′21.29″N 7°48′7.46″W
- Owner: Longford GAA
- Capacity: 10,000
- Surface: Grass
- Field size: 138 m × 88 m (151 yd × 96 yd)
- Public transit: Longford (incl. Bus Éireann route 23); Longford Courthouse bus stop (Bus Éireann route 22)

Pearse Park is a GAA stadium in Longford, Ireland. It is the main grounds of Longford's Gaelic football and hurling teams. In December 2011, the stadium was renamed Glennon Brothers Pearse Park, due to sponsorship with Glennon Brothers, a local timber firm. The ground originally had a capacity of 18,000, however in November 2011, this was cut to 8,000 for health and safety reasons. Following completion of works in recent years, the capacity currently sits at 10,000.

== History ==
The grounds were formerly named the Gaelic Grounds and prior to playing in this location, Longford played its games at Longford Park (later the Greyhound Stadium). Longford moved from Longford Park to the current location in 1933 but the site didn't officially open as Pearse Park until April 1937. The ground was named Pearse Park after Patrick Pearse who had been executed during the Easter Rising.

On 4 June 2006, Dublin defeated Longford by two points at Pearse Park, the last time Dublin have played a Championship match away from Croke Park until they played Laois in Nowlan Park in 2016. Also in 2006, a new West Stand was built. However ten years later, it was discovered to be suffering from subsidence and would have to be demolished and rebuilt. The West Stand was closed from 2015 to 2018. The East Stand also suffered subsidence with a €2 million cost to fix it. As a result, Longford considered plans to leave Pearse Park after GAA officials removed their home advantage for the All-Ireland Senior Football Championship on health and safety grounds.

In 2017, Longford made plans to redevelop Pearse Park. However, there was a planning objection by local resident and former Longford GAA goalkeeper Liam Madden. Madden stated he would drop his opposition if Longford met his demands. He requested that he be made county captain of Longford and be able to lead the team out to the theme of the television series Bonanza. He also requested that Longford change their county colours to red and black to match Longford Town F.C.'s and that the Gaelic Athletic Association give him an Irish language apology for banning him from GAA as a result of him watching an association football match in 1969 under Rule 27 (which was abolished in 1971). Longford County Council approved the €2.5 million redevelopment, with Madden originally planning to appeal to An Bord Pleanála but dropped his appeal after receiving a hand written apology in Irish from the GAA and €100 in compensation. The development was completed in 2018 and the first match held was a Leinster Senior Football Championship game against Meath, with a reduced capacity of 6,000. Following completion of works in recent years, the capacity was increased to 10,000.

== See also ==
- List of Gaelic Athletic Association stadiums
- List of stadiums in Ireland by capacity
