= Leitrim GAA =

Gaelic games governing body in Ireland

- Irish: Liatroim
- Nickname(s): The Canaries; The Ridge County; The Green and Gold
- Province: Connacht
- Dominant sport: Gaelic football
- Ground(s): Páirc Seán Mac Diarmada, Carrick-on-Shannon
- County colours: Green Gold
- Website: www.leitrimgaa.ie

County teams
- NFL: Division 4
- NHL: Division 3B
- Football Championship: Sam Maguire Cup
- Hurling Championship: Nicky Rackard Cup
- Ladies' Gaelic football: Mary Quinn Memorial Cup

The Leitrim County Board of the Gaelic Athletic Association (GAA) (Irish: Cumann Lúthchleas Gael Coiste Chontae Liatroma) or Leitrim GAA is one of the 32 county boards of the GAA in Ireland, and is responsible for Gaelic games in County Leitrim. The county board is also responsible for the Leitrim inter-county teams. The county football team play in the Connacht Senior Football Championship and compete in Division 3 of the National Football League. Considered "Connacht's traditional minnows" and "one of the GAA's Cinderella counties", they have won the Connacht Senior Football Championship on two occasions, the first in 1927, and their second in 1994.

== Governance ==
Enda Stenson became county chairman in December 2019.

== Finances ==
In late-August 2022, it was reported that Leitrim GAA officials had requested funding from the Connacht Provincial Council and the GAA itself, ahead of the county's expected league and championship expeditions to play London and New York in 2023.

== Football ==
Leitrim's football history has brought sparse reward. They first competed in the All-Ireland in the 1907 championship. They were beaten by Roscommon on a score of 0–03 to 0–01 in the Connacht semi-final in their first ever match. The county won its first ever match in the 1910 championship, beating Sligo in the Connacht quarter-final by 0–03 to 0–00. They were then beaten by Galway in the semi-final. Leitrim did not record another win until the 1914 championship. They beat Sligo by 5–07 to 0–02 to qualify for their first ever Connacht final but were beaten by Roscommon in the decider. In the semi-final of the 1924 Connacht Championship, Leitrim forced Mayo to a draw, then refused to play extra-time. Galway went on to be beaten in the final by Mayo following a replay. In 1927, with training from Sean O'Hehir, father of the veteran radio commentator Micheál and with the help of good fortune when Connacht semi-finalists Roscommon had to line out without five players whose car had broken down, Leitrim won their first ever Connacht title. They went on to narrowly lose to Kerry by two points in the semi-final of the All-Ireland Senior Football Championship. The modern "golden age" of Leitrim football began in late 1989 with the appointment of PJ Carroll. Under Carroll's tenure, the county moved from the bottom of Division 3 to the top of Division 2. In 1990, Leitrim won their first national title by defeating Sligo in the final of the All-Ireland 'B' Football Championship at Hyde Park. That same year, midfielder Mickey Quinn became the county's first-ever All-Star, following a notable performance against Kildare in Mick O'Dwyer's first game as manager. John O'Mahony was appointed Leitrim manager in late 1992 to build on this momentum and the success of the Under-21 team that won the 1991 Connacht Championship. O'Mahony introduced a more professionalized setup, including team psychologists and structured pre-match preparations. He took Leitrim to the final of the 1994 Connacht Championship. Leitrim did not have an easy route to the final, beating Roscommon by a point and only overcoming Galway by a point in a replay—their first championship win over Galway since the 1940s. They took on Mayo in the final, overcoming O'Mahony's native county by two points in Hyde Park. O'Mahony's feat in leading the team that is traditionally the weakest in the province to that title is still heralded nationally to this day. The victory was famously marked by 1927 captain Tom Gannon joining Declan Darcy on the podium. Leitrim were ultimately beaten in the All-Ireland semi-final by Dublin at Croke Park. The first county to benefit under the parentage rule was also the first to lose their big catch, with the loss of Darcy to Dublin depleting the panel in 1998, bringing Leitrim's most successful era to an end. Leitrim won the FBD Insurance League in 2013, defeating their neighbours Sligo in the final. This was the county's fourth ever trophy and their first since 1994. They retained the title in 2014, defeating Roscommon in the final. The county's Vocational Schools team have made it to two All-Ireland Vocational Schools Championship Finals losing to Carlow in 1972 and Donegal in 1995.

== Hurling ==
Leitrim hurlers (in green and gold) in action against Warwickshire in 2024

On 20 May 2017, Leitrim defeated Sligo in Round 5 of the Lory Meagher Cup on a scoreline of 3–15 to 3–8 to qualify for the final at Croke Park.

On 22 June 2019, Leitrim defeated Lancashire on a scoreline of 2–23 to 2–22 after extra time to win the 2019 Lory Meagher Cup and qualify for the 2020 Nicky Rackard Cup.

Martin Cunniffe, who had been Leitrim senior hurling manager since 2011, resigned in November 2019.

Former players include Tim Slevin.

Leitrim's hurlers announced that their jerseys would feature the words "No to Racism" during the 2021 season.

- Lory Meagher Cup (1)
  - Champions: 2019
  - Runners Up: 2017
- Connacht Junior Hurling Championship (4)
  - 1969, 1970, 1975, 1976
- Connacht Minor Hurling Championship (1)
  - 1965
- Connacht League Shield (1)
  - 2022

== Ladies' football ==
Manager: Hugh Donnelly.

Leitrim have the following achievements in ladies' football.

- All-Ireland Junior Ladies' Football Championship (1)
  - 1988
- All-Ireland Intermediate Ladies' Football Championship (2)
  - 2007, 2024
- All-Ireland Senior Ladies' Football Championship – Runners up
  - 1984
- Connacht Ladies' Senior Championships (7)
  - 1981, 1982, 1983, 1984, 1985, 1991, 1992

== Camogie ==
Under Camogie's National Development Plan 2010–2015, "Our Game, Our Passion", three new camogie clubs were to be established in Leitrim and a county board assembled by 2015.
