= Ronan McDermott =

Irish hurler (born 1993)

Personal information
- Native name: Rónán Mac Diarmada (Irish)
- Born: 1993 (age 32–33) Burt, County Donegal, Ireland
- Occupation: Construction utility worker
- Height: 5 ft 11 in (180 cm)

Sport
- Sport: Hurling
- Position: Centre-forward
Club
- Years: Club
- 2011-present: Burt
Club titles
- Donegal titles: 7
Inter-county
- Years: County
- 2011-present: Donegal
Inter-county titles
- Ulster titles: 0
- All-Irelands: 0
- NHL: 0
- All Stars: 0

Ronan McDermott (born 1993) is an Irish hurler. At club level he plays with Burt and at inter-county level with the Donegal senior hurling team.

== Career ==
McDermott first played hurling at juvenile and underage levels with the Burt club. After progressing to adult level, he won five consecutive Donegal SHC between 2011 and 2015. The first of these wins was converted into an Ulster Club JHC title. McDermott claimed further SHC honours in 2018 and as team captain in 2024. He was also part of Burt's Donegal IFC-winning team in 2016.

McDermott first appeared on the inter-county scene with Donegal as a member of the minor team. He later spent three successive years with the under-21 team, but ended his underage career without success. McDermott was still eligible for the minor grade when he joined the senior team. He was an unused substitute when Donegal won the Lory Meagher Cup in 2011. McDermott was also involved for all four of Donegal's Nicky Rackard Cup successes between 2013 and 2024. He made his 100th appearance for the Donegal senior team in February 2022.

== Honours ==
Burt

- Ulster Junior Club Hurling Championship: 2011, 2025
- Donegal Senior Hurling Championship: 2011, 2012, 2013, 2014, 2015, 2018, 2024 (c)
- Donegal Intermediate Football Championship: 2016

Donegal

- Nicky Rackard Cup: 2013, 2018, 2020, 2024
- Lory Meagher Cup: 2011
- National Hurling League Division 3A: 2014, 2017, 2020

Sporting positions
Preceded by	Donegal senior hurling team captain 2022-2023	Succeeded by Conor Gartland
