= Danny Cullen =

Donegal and Setanta hurler

Personal information
- Born: 1987/8

Sport
- Sport: Hurling
Club
- Years: Club
- 200?–: Setanta
Inter-county
Years	County	Apps (scores)
c. 2003/4–	Donegal	153

Danny Cullen (born 1987/8) is a hurler. He plays for Setanta, the Donegal county team and the Ireland national team.

He has won three Nicky Rackard Cups and represented (and captained) Ireland against Scotland in the Shinty-Hurling International Series.

== Playing career ==
=== Club ===
Cullen's grandfather, Danny Snr, was a founder of Setanta in 1979. He (the grandson) won a Donegal Senior Hurling Championship in 2017. Setanta followed this with an Ulster Junior Club Hurling Championship, also in 2017. He won another Donegal SHC in 2019, scoring 0–1 in the final.

He played on the Setanta team that won the 2022 Ulster Junior Club Hurling Championship.

He played on the Setanta team that won the 2023 Ulster Intermediate Club Hurling Championship, thus becoming the first team from Donegal to win the competition, and scored 0–1 in the final.

Cullen has coached under-age teams for his club.

=== College ===
He played for NUI Galway.

=== Inter-county ===
Cullen made his debut for Donegal at the age of 16. He has also captained his county.

He was part of a delegation to Croke Park who staged a sit-in as part of their effort to free Donegal manager Eamonn Campbell from suspension for the 2009 Lory Meagher Cup final against Tyrone.

Cullen won the 2013 Nicky Rackard Cup with Donegal, playing in the final against Roscommon and scoring three points.

He played for Donegal during the 2018 National Hurling League, when the county recorded their first competitive victories over Derry and Down. He later cited the Down victory as important to him, since Down versus Tipperary in the 1997 All-Ireland Senior Hurling Championship semi-final was the first hurling match he attended at Croke Park. Donegal also defeated Armagh in the closing game of that league campaign. They went on to win the 2018 Nicky Rackard Cup.

Cullen featured in the 2016 Champions 15. He was also a Champions 15 nominee in 2019. He was named on the 2020 Champions 15 team and also received the Nicky Rackard Hurler of the Year following Donegal's earlier victory in the 2020 Nicky Rackard Cup Final. He scored three points in the final.

By the end of 2022, Cullen had made 153 appearances for Donegal (more than any other panel member), with Seán McVeigh — who retired that year — in second place, ending on 129 appearances.

Cullen was named on the 2023 Champion 15 Team of the Year.

=== International ===
Cullen was selected to play for Ireland against Scotland in the Shinty–Hurling International Series played over two games at Croke Park in Dublin and Bught Park in Inverness in 2013. He was also selected for the Inverness contest at Bught Park in 2018. Ireland lost. He captained the Ireland team for the Abbotstown contest in 2019, and was his county's only representative in that year's squad. Though he scored, Ireland lost.

== Personal life ==
Cullen's sister, Ciara, is married to Declan Coulter.

He appeared in a short film on hurling made by a CNN-owned company based in New York and London.

He had a honeymoon in 2022.

== Honours ==
Setanta

- Ulster Intermediate Club Hurling Championship: 2023
- Ulster Junior Club Hurling Championship: 2017, 2022
- Donegal Senior Hurling Championship: 2017, 2019

Donegal

- Nicky Rackard Cup: 2013, 2018, 2020
- National Hurling League Division 3A: 2020

Individual

- Donegal Hurler of the Year: 2013
- Champions 15: 2016, 2020, 2023
- Nicky Rackard Hurler of the Year: 2020
