= Kevin Campbell (hurler) =

Irish hurler

Sport
- Sport: Hurling
Club
- Years: Club
- 200?–: Setanta
Inter-county
- Years: County
- 200?–: Donegal

Kevin Campbell is a hurler. He plays for Setanta and the Donegal county team.

Campbell won a Donegal Senior Hurling Championship with Setanta in 2017. Setanta followed this up with an Ulster Junior Club Hurling Championship, also in 2017, with Campbell scoring 0–11 (all frees) in the final against Na Magha. He won another Donegal SHC in 2019, scoring 0–5 (all frees) in the final.

As team captain, Campbell was part of a delegation to Croke Park who staged a sit-in as part of their effort to free manager Eamonn Campbell from suspension for the 2009 Lory Meagher Cup final against Tyrone.

Campbell won the 2013 Nicky Rackard Cup with Donegal, appearing as a late substitute in the final against Roscommon.

He played for Donegal during the 2018 National Hurling League, when the county recorded their first competitive victories over Derry and Down (though he did not feature in the Down game). Donegal also defeated Armagh in the closing game of that league campaign, with Campbell appearing as a late substitute. They went on to win the 2018 Nicky Rackard Cup, with Campbell again appearing as late substitute in the final.

== Honours ==
- 2013 Nicky Rackard Cup
- Ulster Junior Club Hurling Championship: 2017
- Donegal Senior Hurling Championship 2017 2019
- 2018 Nicky Rackard Cup
