= 2024 Donegal Senior Hurling Championship =

Annual hurling competition season

- Dates: 14 June – 31 August 2024
- Teams: 8
- Champions: Burt (40th title); Ronan McDermott (captain); Mickey McGrath (manager)
- Runners-up: Setanta; Mark Callaghan (captain): Kevin Campbell (manager); Niall Cleary; (manager)

Tournament statistics
- Matches played: 17
- Goals scored: 69 (4.06 per match)
- Points scored: 523 (30.76 per match)
- Top scorer(s): Liam Óg McKinney

The 2024 Donegal Senior Hurling Championship was the 89th staging of the Donegal Senior Hurling Championship since its establishment by the Cavan County Board in 1908. The championship ran from 14 June to 31 August 2024.

Setanta were the defending champions.

The final was played on 31 August 2024 at O'Donnell Park in Letterkenny, between Burt and Setanta. Burt won the match by 3–16 to 1–18 to claim their 40th championship title overall and a first title in six years.

== Group A ==
=== Group A table ===
Qualify for SHC Stage B Qualify for IHC

Team	Matches				Score			Pts
Team	Pld	W	D	L	For	Against	Diff	Pts
Setanta	3	3	0	0	33	11	22	6
Seán MacCumhaills	3	2	0	1	61	63	-2	4
Buncrana	3	1	0	2	53	22	31	2
Aodh Ruadh	3	0	0	3	21	72	-51	0

=== Group A results ===
14 June 2024 Round 1	Buncrana	5-24 - 0-06	Aodh Ruadh	Buncrana Grounds

19 June 2024 Round 1	Setanta	3-24 - 1-08	Seán MacCumhaills	Setanta Park
	G Gilmore 1-11, 1-6fs; N Cleary 1-2; D Harvey 1-1; J McGee Cronolly and R Campbell 0-3 each; S McBride and D Cullen 0-2 each.	Report	L Henderson 1-6, 1-5f; J de Ward and J Bradley Walsh 0-1 each.

28 June 2024 Round 2	Seán MacCumhaills	2-10 - 2-08	Buncrana	MacCumhaill Park
	L Henderson 0-9, 7f; C McSorley and F Griffin 1-0 each; C Griffin 0-1.	Report	K O’Rourke 2-1; C O’Neill 0-3, 2f; D Duffy 0-2; O Grant and D Carey 0-1 each.

28 June 2024 Round 2	Setanta	w/o - scr.	Aodh Ruadh

5 July 2024 Round 3	Aodh Ruadh	2-10 - 5-19	Seán MacCumhaills	Fr Tierney Park
	S Rooney 1-8; A Neilan 1-0; K McNulty and C McKenna 0-1 each.	Report	G Browne 2-2; D Hannigan 2-1; L Henderson 0-6, 6fs; P Bradley 0-4; J De Ward 0-3; F Griffin 1-1; A Toner 0-2.

5 July 2024 Round 3	Setanta	w/o - scr.	Buncrana

== Group B ==
=== Group B table ===
Qualify for SHC Stage B Qualify for IHC

Team	Matches				Score			Pts
Team	Pld	W	D	L	For	Against	Diff	Pts
Burt	3	2	1	0	94	34	60	5
St Eunan's	3	2	1	0	94	41	53	5
Carndonagh	3	1	0	2	56	73	-17	2
An Clochán Liath	3	0	0	3	30	126	-96	0

=== Group B results ===
21 June 2024 Round 1	Burt	3-23 - 1-05	Carndonagh	Hibernian Park
	L Óg McKinney 1-10,1-7f; R McDermott 1-1; K Brady 1-1; C Porter 0-2; C Purves 0-2; C McDermott 0-2; S Gillespie, A McKinney, F Gill and K Curran 0-1; each.	Report	D Tullly 1-0; L White 0-3f; C Doherty and D Monagle 0-1; each.

23 June 2024 Round 1	St Eunan's	7-23 - 2-07	An Clochán Liath	Convoy Centre of Excellence
	D O Maoileidigh 2-4; B Gaffey 2-2; B McIntyre 1-5; C O’Brien 0-5; P Kelly 0-3; J Kealy 1-0; F Delaney 1-0; K Kealy 0-2; M Ahern and R Hilferty 0-1 each	Report	R Ryan 1-3; C Diver 1-2; E Walsh and N Weherly 0-1 each.

28 June 2024 Round 2	An Clochán Liath	0-07 - 7-22	Burt	Rosses Park

28 June 2024 Round 2	Carndonagh	0-09 - 2-25	St Eunan's	Ó Dochartaigh Park
	L White 0-9,7f.	Report	C O’Brien 0-9,6f; S McVeigh 1-2; J Kealy 1-2; D Ó Maoileidigh 0-5; P Kelly 0-2; B Gaffey 0-1; M Ahern 0-1; R Hilferty 0-1; B MacIntyre 0-1; C Finn 0-1.

5 July 2024 Round 3	Burt	3-10 - 1-16	St Eunan's	Hibernian Park
	L Óg McKinney 0-7, 5f; R McDermott 2-1; K Brady 1-0; C Bradley and C Porter 0-1 each.	Report	P Kelly 0-9, 8f; D Ó Maoileidigh 1-2; B McIntyre 0-3; F Delaney 0-2.

7 July 2024 Round 3	An Clochán Liath	1-07 - 4-27	Carndonagh	Hibernian Park
	R Ryan 1-4; N Wehrly 0-2; F O’Toole 0-1.	Report	C Doherty 1-4; L White 0-7, 6f; M Porter, D Doherty, and D McCormick 1-2 each; C Doherty 0-4; D Tully 0-3; M McCarron 0-2; D Monagle 0-1.

== Stage B ==
=== Stage B table ===
Finalists

Team	Matches				Score			Pts
Team	Pld	W	D	L	For	Against	Diff	Pts
Setanta	3	3	0	0	88	48	40	6
Burt	3	1	1	1	69	54	15	3
St Eunan's	3	1	1	1	53	56	-3	3
Sean MacCumhaills	3	0	0	3	34	86	-52	0

=== Stage B results ===
12 July 2024 Round 1	Burt	2-27 - 1-07	Sean MacCumhaills	Hibernian Park
	L Óg McKinney 0-14, 7f, 1 65; C Gartland 1-2; S Gillespie 1-1; K Brady 0-4; C Bradley 0-2; C McDermott 0-1; C Purves 0-1; S Gallagher 0-1; A McKinney 0-1;	Report	L Henderson 1-5,1pen, 3f; F Griffin 0-1; G Browne 0-1.

12 July 2024 Round 1	Setanta	3-20 - 0-15	St Eunan's	Setanta Park
	J McGee Cronolly 2-1; G Gilmore 0-5,4f; D Coulter 0-4; D Harvey 0-4; R Campbell 0-4; D Cullen 1-1; S Ward 0-1.	Report	P Kelly 0-6,6f; K Kealy 0-2; S McVeigh 0-2; B McIntyre 0-1; J Kealy 0-1; C Finn 0-1; D Horgan 0-1,1ff; B Gaffey 0-1.

27 July 2024 Round 2	Setanta	2-22 - 3-11	Burt	Setanta Park
	G Gilmore 1-10,9f; J McGee Cronolly 1-2; O Marley 0-3; D Coulter 0-2; D Cullen 0-2; D Harvey 0-2; F Farren 0-1;	Report	L McKinney 0-6, 5f; R McDermott 1-1 C Purves 1-0; C Porter 1-0 C McDermott 0-2; K Brady 0-2.

27 July 2024 Round 2	St Eunan's	1-19 - 0-11	Sean MacCumhaills	O'Donnell Park
	P Kelly 0-9, 7f; B MacIntyre 0-5; J Kealy 1-2; C Finn 0-2; F Delaney 0-1.	Report	L Henderson 0-6, 5f; F Griffin 0-2 each; C Griffin, J Bradley-Walsh, and PJ Browne 0-1 each.

31 July 2024 Round 3	Sean MacCumhaills	0-13 - 2-25	Setanta	MacCumhaill Park
	L Henderson 0-6, 6fs; G Browne 0-3; J de Ward and F Griffin 0-2 each.	Report	R Campbell 1-4; G Gilmore 0-6, 4fs; C McGettigan 1-1; D Coulter 0-3; F Farren, R Coyle, N Cleary, D Harvey, and O Marley 0-2 each; C Melaugh 0-1.

2 August 2024 Round 3	Burt	1-13 - 0-16	St Eunan's	Hibernian Park
	L McKinney 0-7, 6f; R McDermott 1-2; C Gartland 0-1, S Gillespie, C McDermott, D Grant 0-1 each.	Report	P Kelly 0-7, 6f; B MacIntyre 0-6; C Finn 0-2; R Hilferty 0-1.

== Knockout stage ==
=== Final ===
31 August 2024 Final	Setanta	1-18 - 3-16	Burt	O'Donnell Park
	G Gilmore 0-12, 11f; J McGee Cronolly 1-2; R Campbell 0-2; D Coulter 0-2; D Cullen 0-1; O Marley 0-1; S Ward 0-1.	Report	L McKinney 1-11, 8f; D Grant 1-1; K Curran 1-0; K Brady 0-2; A McKinney 0-1; S Gillespie 0-1.	Referee: J Connors
