= Seán McVeigh =

Gaelic footballer and hurler

Personal information
- Born: 1990/91

Sport
- Sport: Dual player
Club
- Years: Club
- 20??–: St Eunan's
Club titles
	Football	Hurling
Donegal titles	3	1
Inter-county
Years	County	Apps (scores)
2007–2022	Donegal	129

Seán McVeigh (born 1990/91) is a dual player. He plays Gaelic football for St Eunan's, as well as, formerly, hurling for the Donegal county team.

McVeigh is from Letterkenny. He made his inter-county debut at the age of 16, away to Longford in the 2007 National Hurling League.

He played for the full game and scored at Croke Park when Donegal won the Lory Meagher Cup in 2011. He has also scored in the National Hurling League and Nicky Rackard Cup.

In 2012, he won the Donegal Senior Football Championship with his club team, scoring in the final as well.

He was named on the Nicky Rackard 'Champion XV' in 2012, to formally be awarded at that year's All Stars Banquet.

He scored a goal in the final of the 2013 Nicky Rackard Cup as Donegal defeated Roscommon. His goal was an exceptional solo effort. However, due to restructure of the competitions, Donegal were not promoted to the 2014 Christy Ring Cup.

McVeigh spent time in Barcelona in 2018. He did not play every game of the 2018 National Hurling League for Donegal, when the county recorded their first competitive victories over Derry and Down (he did not play against Derry but did against Down). However, he did play and score a point in the loss to Wicklow, and also played when Donegal defeated Armagh in the closing game of that league campaign.

Donegal went on to win their second Nicky Rackard Cup in 2018, with McVeigh again involved.

He returned to Letterkenny from Barcelona in time to compete for his county in the 2019 Christy Ring Cup.

He took over from Danny Cullen as captain of the Donegal hurling team ahead of the 2020 season. He led them to the 2020 Nicky Rackard Cup.

He announced his retirement from inter-county hurling in June 2022. With 129 appearances, only Danny Cullen (153) was ahead of him from the 2022 panel, while Ronan McDermott was in third (108).

== Honours ==
Team

- 2005 Ulster Under-16C
- 2008 Ulster Under-21B
- 2022 Ulster Under-21B
- 2011 Lory Meagher Cup
- 2012 Donegal Senior Football Championship
- 2013 Nicky Rackard Cup
- 2014 National Hurling League Division 3A
- 2014 Donegal Senior Football Championship
- 2016 Ulster Senior Hurling Shield
- 2018 Nicky Rackard Cup
- 2020 National Hurling League Division 3A
- 2020 Nicky Rackard Cup
- 2021 Donegal Senior Hurling Championship
- 2021 Donegal Senior Football Championship

Individual

- 2013: Nicky Rackard All Star
