= Declan Coulter =

Donegal, Armagh and Setanta hurler

Personal information
- Born: 1987/8
- Occupation: Primary school teacher

Sport
- Sport: Hurling
Clubs
- Years: Club
- 20??–201? 201?–: Cuchulainn's; Setanta
Inter-county
- Years: County
- 2005–2016 2017–: Armagh; Donegal

Declan Coulter (born 1987/8) is a hurler. He plays for Setanta, the Donegal county team and the Ireland national team.

Coulter previously played for Cuchulainn's and the Armagh county team.

== Playing career ==
=== Club ===
Following a move to Donegal, Coulter began playing for Setanta with whom he won a Donegal Senior Hurling Championship and an Ulster Junior Club Hurling Championship in 2017, scoring 1–6 in the Ulster JCHC final against Na Magha. He won his second Donegal SHC in 2019, scoring 1–2 (including 1 free) in the final. He played on the Setanta team that won the 2022 Ulster Junior Club Hurling Championship, scoring 0–10 (0–5 of which were frees) in the final. He played on the Setanta team that won the 2023 Ulster Intermediate Club Hurling Championship, thus becoming the first team from Donegal to win the competition, and scored 0–1 in the final.

=== Inter-county ===
Coulter made his inter-county debut for Armagh at the age of 17 in 2005. He won his first Nicky Rackard Cup in 2010. He won his second Nicky Rackard Cup with Armagh in 2012, scoring 2–2 in the final against Louth. He continued to play for Armagh until 2016.

Coulter began playing for Donegal in 2017. He played for Donegal during the 2018 National Hurling League, when the county recorded their first competitive victories over Derry and Down (he scored 1–1 in the comprehensive defeat of Derry and 0–2 in the three-point defeat of Down). Donegal also defeated Armagh in the closing game of that league campaign, with Coulter contributing 2–1 (including one penalty) to the three-point victory over his former side. Donegal went on to win the 2018 Nicky Rackard Cup, Coulter's first for Donegal and third overall, with Coulter scoring 1–10 (0–4 of which were frees, 0–1 of which was a '65) in the final, a seven-point victory for Donegal. He was later named Nicky Rackard Hurler of the Year. He and fellow Donegal player Stephen Gillespie featured on the Nicky Rackard Team of the Year.

Coulter was named as a replacement on the 2018 All-Star team for their game against the 2019 All-Star team in Abu Dhabi in November 2019. He put in a man of the match performance and scored 1–6 from play, despite not being an actual All-Star and being in the presence of hurlers from teams ranked above any across Ulster. Martin Breheny, in the Irish Independent, wrote that Coulter, having outscored teammates of the calibre of Séamus Harnedy (Cork) and Graeme Mulcahy (Limerick), had "made a major statement on behalf of hurlers from lower-ranked counties".

Coulter has expressed his support for the "Team Ulster" concept that would allow Ulster to contest the Liam MacCarthy Cup.

== Personal life ==
Having spent several years living in Dublin, Coulter settled in the Finn Valley area of County Donegal. He met Ciara Cullen from Donegal while representing Ireland in the Shinty-Hurling International Series in Dublin in 2006. Coulter later married her. Cullen is the sister of Donegal player Danny. Coulter has since become a father. He has a son and a daughter.

== Honours ==
Armagh

- Nicky Rackard Cup: 2010, 2012

Donegal

- Nicky Rackard Cup: 2018

Setanta

- Ulster Intermediate Club Hurling Championship: 2023
- Ulster Junior Club Hurling Championship: 2017, 2022
- Donegal Senior Hurling Championship: 2017, 2019

Individual

- Nicky Rackard Hurler of the Year: 2018
- Nicky Rackard Team of the Year: 2018
- All-Stars Man of the Match, Abu Dhabi: 2019
- Donegal News Sports Personality winner: March 2020
