= Lee Henderson (hurler) =

Irish hurler (born 1990)

Personal information
- Born: March 1990

Sport
- Sport: Hurling
- Position: Forward
Club
- Years: Club
- 20??–: Seán Mac Cumhaills
Club titles
- Donegal titles: 2
Inter-county
- Years: County
- 2007–2021: Donegal

Lee Henderson (born March 1990) is a hurler who plays as a forward for Seán Mac Cumhaills and also, formerly, for the Donegal county team.

== Playing career ==
=== Club ===
Henderson won a Donegal Senior Hurling Championship title with his club in 2010, and won a second one as captain in 2016. He then captained his club to the 2022 Donegal Intermediate Hurling Championship title.

=== Inter-county ===
Henderson made his debut for Donegal at the age of 17.

He came on as a late substitute in the final of the 2011 Lory Meagher Cup as Donegal claimed a first All-Ireland hurling title with victory over Tyrone.

He won the 2013 Nicky Rackard Cup with Donegal, playing in the final against Roscommon and scoring ten points (seven of which were frees).

Henderson played for Donegal during the 2018 National Hurling League, when the county recorded their first competitive victories over Derry and Down. Donegal also defeated Armagh in the closing game of that league campaign. Donegal went on to win the 2018 Nicky Rackard Cup, though Henderson's role in the final was limited to a late substitute appearance due to an ankle injury.

The Donegal News described Henderson in 2020 as "one of Donegal's most consistent performers for the last decade".

Injury forced him to retire from inter-county hurling at the end of the 2021 season.

== Coaching career ==
Henderson coached the Donegal under-20 hurlers in 2022 under the management of Paul Burns.

== Honours ==
Club

- 2010 Donegal Senior Hurling Championship
- 2016 Donegal Senior Hurling Championship (c)
- 2022 Donegal Intermediate Hurling Championship (c)

County

- 2011 Lory Meagher Cup
- 2013 Nicky Rackard Cup
- 2018 Nicky Rackard Cup
