= 2020 Nicky Rackard Cup final =

Hurling decider

2020 Nicky Rackard final
- Event: 2020 Nicky Rackard Cup
Donegal	Mayo
3–18	0–21
- Date: 22 November 2020
- Venue: Croke Park, Dublin
- Referee: Kevin Jordan (Tipperary)
- Attendance: 0 (Note: The game was played behind closed doors due to the impact of the COVID-19 pandemic on Gaelic games.)

The 2020 Nicky Rackard Cup final was played at Croke Park in Dublin on 22 November 2020. It was contested by Donegal and Mayo.

Donegal won the competition for a third time, becoming the first team to achieve this.

Mickey McCann was manager. Seán McVeigh was captain. However, the 2020 win did not secure passage back to the 2021 Christy Ring Cup for Donegal, a condition that was not made clear until shortly before the final.

== Match details ==
22 November 2020

Donegal	3–18 – 0–21	Mayo
D Flynn 1-3, R Ryan 1-0, D Coulter 0-9 (7f), J Boyle 1-1, D Cullen 0-3, R McDermott 0-1, G Gilmore 0-1	Report	S Boland 0-11 (10f), B Morley, 0-2, C Freeman 0-2, A Philips 0-1, J Coyne 0-1, E Delaney 0-1, S Regan 0-1, C Scahill 0-1, S Kenny 0-1 ‘65

Croke Park, Dublin
Referee: Kevin Jordan (Tipperary)

Donegal	Mayo

?	Luke White
?	Mark Callaghan
?	Stephen Gillespie
?	Gavin Browne
?	Michael Donaghue
?	Seán McVeigh (c)
?	Joe Boyle
?	Ciaran Mathewson
?	Danny Cullen
?	Ronan McDermott
?	Jack O'Loughlin
?	Kevin Kealy
?	Davin Flynn
?	Declan Coulter
?	Gerard Gilmore
Substitutes:
?	Ritchie Ryan for Kealy (29 mins)
?	Bernard Lafferty for Mathewson (62 mins)
?	Conor O'Grady for Cullen (74 mins)
Manager:
Mickey McCann

?	Gerald Kelly
?	Gary Nolan
?	Stephen Coyne
?	John Cassidy
?	Brian Hunt
?	David Kenny
?	Cathal Freeman
?	Sean Regan
?	Sean Kenny
?	Adrian Philips
?	Shane Boland
?	Corey Scahill
?	Jason Coyne
?	Brian Morley
?	Eoin Delaney
Substitutes:
?	Liam Lavin for J. Coyne (51 mins)
?	Cormac Phillips for Delaney (54 mins)
?	Daniel Huane for Hunt (64 mins)
?	Sean Mulroy for Morley (66 mins)
Manager:
Derek Walsh

Man of the Match:
?
