= Jamesie Donnelly =

Irish hurler

Sport
- Sport: Hurling
Club
- Years: Club
- 20??-: Seán Mac Cumhaills
Inter-county
- Years: County
- 20??–2018: Donegal

Jamesie Donnelly is a hurler. He plays for Seán Mac Cumhaills and, formerly, the Donegal county team.

== Playing career ==
He won the 2011 Lory Meagher Cup with his county, starting and completing the final.

Donnelly also won the 2013 Nicky Rackard Cup, starting and completing the final. He then won the 2018 Nicky Rackard Cup, starting the final before being substituted at half-time.

Donnelly retired from inter-county hurling in 2018.

== Other roles ==
Donnelly was part of the county management team in 2021, but had left this role by early 2022.

In January 2024, he was announced as manager of his club's senior hurling team.

== Personal life ==
From Ballybofey, Donnelly is married to Claire. The couple have had several children. Their third child, a daughter, died of triploid syndrome in February 2018.
