= 2015 Donegal Senior Hurling Championship =

Annual hurling competition season

- Dates: 11 July 2015 – 12 September 2015
- Teams: 6
- Champions: Burt; Ciarán Dowds (captain)
- Runners-up: Seán McCumhaills

Tournament statistics
- Matches played: 16
- Goals scored: 78 (4.88 per match)
- Points scored: 326 (20.38 per match)

The 2015 Donegal Senior Hurling Championship was the 85th staging of the Donegal Senior Hurling Championship since its establishment by the Donegal County Board in 1924. The championship began on 11 July 2015 and ended on 12 September 2015.

Burt were the defending champions and successfully retained the title following a 2–7 to 0–12 defeat of Seán McCumhaills in the final.

== Results ==
=== Table ===
Pos	Team	Pld	W	D	L	For	Ag.	Diff.	Pts.
1	Burt	5	4	1	0	134	63	71	9
2	Seán McCumhaills	5	4	0	1	122	78	44	8
3	Setanta	5	3	1	1	98	53	45	7
4	Aodh Ruadh	5	2	0	3	59	91	-32	4
5	St Eunan's	5	1	0	4	82	70	12	2
6	Buncrana	5	0	0	5	43	183	-140	0

=== Final ===
12 September 2015 Final	Burt	2-7 - 0-12	Seán McCumhaills	O'Donnell Park
15:00				Referee: É Hassan
