= Carndonagh GAA =

Carndonagh
- Carndomhnaigh
- Founded: 1921
- County: Donegal
- Colours: Red and green
- Grounds: O'Doherty Park

Playing kits
Standard colours

Senior Club Championships
| | All Ireland | Ulster champions | Donegal champions |
|---|---|---|---|
| Hurling: | 0 | 0 | 3 |
| Camogie: | 0 | 0 | 2 |

Carndonagh GAA is a Gaelic Athletic Association club in Carndonagh, County Donegal, Ireland. The club fields teams in Hurling, Camogie and Gaelic football.

== History ==
Located in the town of Carndonagh, in the Inishowen peninsula in County Donegal, Carndongh GAA Club was founded in 1921 as a hurling club and named Cuchulainns. The club fielded its first Gaelic football team in 1938. Carndonagh had its most successful era between 1944 and 1959 when three Donegal SHC titles were won. The club also reached the final of the Donegal SFC in 1953. Carndonagh regularly supplied players to the Donegal senior hurling team at this time, with 12 club players making up the team in 1947 and 1948, however, by the 1970s emigration had taken a toll. The club no longer fielded a Gaelic football team but the hurlers continued to line out in tournament games.

In recent times Carndonagh fields teams in all 4 codes and won both the Donegal IHC and the Donegal SCC title in 2023 and 2026 and the Donegal JFC in 2025.

== Honours ==
- Donegal Senior Hurling Championship (3): 1944, 1954, 1959
- Donegal Intermediate Football Championship (1): 1997
- Donegal Intermediate Hurling Championship (1): 2023
- Donegal Junior Football Championship (4): 1950, 1952, 2008, 2025
- Donegal Junior Hurling Championship (2): 1958, 1995
- Donegal Senior Camogie Championship (2?): 2023, 2026

== Notable players ==
- Pádraig Doherty: Nicky Rackard Cup winner (2018)
- Luke White: Nicky Rackard Cup winner (2024)
- Conor O'Donnell: Ulster Senior Football Championship winner
