= Donegal Intermediate Hurling Championship =

Annual hurling competition for Intermediate clubs in Donegal

- Irish: Craobhchomórtas Idirmhéanach Iomána Dhún na nGall
- Code: Hurling
- Founded: 2022; 4 years ago
- Region: Donegal (GAA)
- No. of teams: 4
- Title holders: Carndonagh (2nd title)
- Official website: Donegal GAA

The Donegal Intermediate Hurling Championship (abbreviated to the Donegal IHC) is an annual hurling competition organised by the Donegal County Board of the Gaelic Athletic Association since 2022 for the second tier hurling teams in County Donegal in Ireland.

In its current format, the Donegal Intermediate Championship features the four teams who don't qualify for the second stage of the Donegal SHC. These four teams play each other in a round-robin system. The top two teams in the group proceed to the intermediate final at O'Donnell Park in Letterkenny. The winner of the Donegal Intermediate Hurling Championship qualifies for the subsequent Ulster Intermediate Club Championship.

Carndonagh are the title holders after defeating Aodh Ruadh by 3–11 to 0–11 in the 2026 final.

== Teams ==
The four teams that qualified for the 2026 Donegal Intermediate Hurling Championship were:

Team	Location	Colours	Titles won	Most recent title
An Clochán Liath	Dungloe	Red and white	0	—N/a
Aodh Ruadh	Ballyshannon	Green and white	0	—N/a
Buncrana	Buncrana		1	2024
Carndonagh	Carndonagh		2	2026

== Format ==
The 4 teams compete 2 Semi-finals followed by the Final.

== Qualification for subsequent competitions ==
The Donegal IHC winner qualifies for the Ulster Junior Club Hurling Championship. It is the only team from County Donegal to qualify for this competition. The Donegal IHC winner enters the Ulster Junior Club Hurling Championship at the quarter-final stage.

== Results by team ==
Team	Title wins	Runners-up	Years won	Years runner-up
Carndonagh	2	2	2023, 2026	2022, 2024
Seán MacCumhaills	1	1	2022	2023
Buncrana	1	0	2024	—N/a
St Eunan's	1	0	2025	—N/a
Dungloe	0	1	—N/a	2025
Aodh Ruadh	0	1	—N/a	2026

== Finals listed by year ==
Year	Winner		Opponent		Winning captain	Winning manager	Venue
Year	Club	Score	Club	Score	Winning captain	Winning manager	Venue
2022	Seán MacCumhaills	0–17	Carndonagh	1–12	Lee Henderson		O'Donnell Park
2023	Carndonagh	2–12	Seán MacCumhaills	2-8		Cathal Doherty	O'Donnell Park
2024	Buncrana	0-15	Carndonagh	1-10	Conor Grant	Tommy O'Neill	O'Donnell Park
2025	St Eunan's	0-13	Dungloe	0-06	Conor Neely		O'Donnell Park
2026	Carndonagh	3-11	Aodh Ruadh	0-11			O'Donnell Park

== See also ==
- Donegal Senior Hurling Championship (Tier 1)
- Donegal Junior Hurling Championship (Tier 3)
