= Burt GAA =

Burt
- An Beart
- Founded: 1887
- County: Donegal
- Colours: Primrose and blue
- Grounds: Hibernian Park
- Coordinates: 55°01′55″N 7°27′38″W

Playing kits
Standard colours

Senior Club Championships
	All Ireland	Ulster champions	Donegal champions
Hurling:	0	2	40

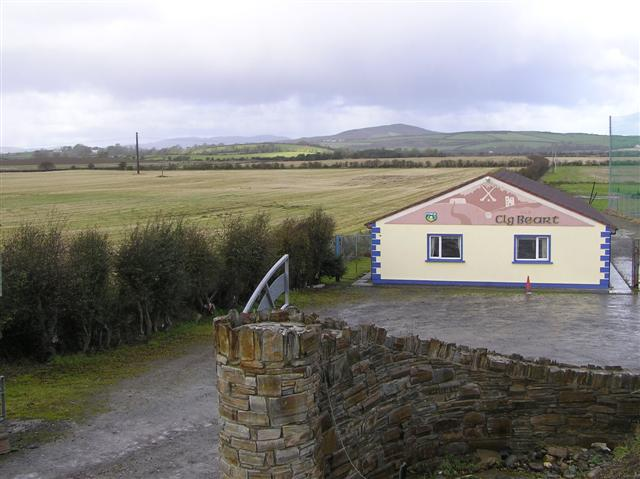
Clubhouse

Burt GAA is a Gaelic Athletic Association club located in the parish of Burt, County Donegal, Ireland. The club fields teams in hurling, Gaelic football, camogie and Ladies' Gaelic football.

== History ==
Located in the parish of Burt, on the main road between Letterkenny and Derry, Burt GAA Club is one of the oldest clubs in Donegal, having been founded in 1887 during the period of the Gaelic revival in Ireland. Evidence of Gaelic games activity in the area even pre-dates the establishment of the Gaelic Athletic Association.

Since winning their first Donegal SHC title in 1952, the club has come to dominate the championship. From 1991 to 2006, Burt won a record 16 titles in-a-row. The club won its 40th SHC title in 2024. With 40 Donegal Senior Hurling Championship titles under their belt, Burt have won the most County titles out of all hurling clubs in Ireland, pipping Thurles Sarsfields GAA who have 36 Tipperary Senior Hurling Championship titles. Burt have won the Ulster Junior Club Hurling Championship twice, in 2011 and most recently in 2025.

Burt GAA Club has also enjoyed success on the Gaelic football field, winning a Donegal JFC title in 2011 and a Donegal IFC title in 2016.

== Honours ==
- Ulster Junior Club Hurling Championship (2): 2011, 2025
- Donegal Senior Hurling Championship (40): 1952, 1955, 1956, 1957, 1961, 1962, 1965, 1967, 1968, 1969, 1970, 1971, 1976, 1979, 1982, 1989, 1991, 1992, 1993, 1994, 1995, 1996, 1997, 1998, 1999, 2000, 2001, 2002, 2003, 2004, 2005, 2006, 2009, 2011, 2012, 2013, 2014, 2015, 2018, 2024
- Donegal Intermediate Football Championship (1): 2016
- Donegal Junior Football Championship (1): 2011
- Derry Senior Hurling Championship (2): 1930, 1931

== Notable players ==
- Niall 'Jude' Campbell: 2011 Lory Meagher Hurler of the Year.
- Andrew Wallace: 20-time Donegal SHC-winner.
- Ciarán Dowds: 20-time Donegal SHC-winner.
- Mickey McCann: 20-time Donegal SHC-winner and Donegal county hurling team manager 2017-current.
- Paul Callaghan: Goalkeeper on the Donegal County football team 1991–1998.
- Georgie Kelly: Professional soccer player.
- Mark Coyle: Professional soccer player.
- Sadhbh McGrath: Professional women's rugby union player.
