= Ray Durack =

Irish hurler and manager

Ray Durack is an Irish hurling manager and former player. He is originally from Portumna, County Galway.

He formerly played for and later managed the Donegal county team, serving in that role from January 2012 until announcing his departure in May 2015. He has also managed Burt to the Donegal Senior Hurling Championship.

Durack led Donegal to the 2013 Nicky Rackard Cup. However, due to restructure of the competitions, Donegal were not promoted to the 2014 Christy Ring Cup. Durack then brought the county to Division 2B of the National Hurling League in 2014 (their highest league ranking in team history).

His name was mentioned in media coverage during the search to succeed Ardal McDermott, his successor as Donegal manager, but Durack withdrew his name from selection.
