= Mickey McCann =

Irish hurler and manager

Michael "Mickey" McCann is an Irish hurling manager and former player. He currently manages the Donegal county team and plays as goalkeeper for Burt.

He played when Donegal won the 2011 Lory Meagher Cup and scored a point in the final at Croke Park.

On 25 October 2017, the county board announced McCann's appointment as senior manager on a two-year contract, with the possibility of a third year in charge also mentioned. The county board had specifically identified him after all candidates nominated for the position were rejected as unsuitable.

McCann led Donegal to first competitive victories over Derry and Down in the 2018 National Hurling League. He later led Donegal to the 2018 and 2020 Nicky Rackard Cups.

McCann played as a goalkeeper for Burt in the 2020 Donegal Senior Hurling Championship.

He received the Special Recognition Award in January 2021, one of 12 awards given by the Donegal Sports Star Committee. He collected the award at the end of that year.
