= Ardal McDermott =

Irish hurler and manager

Ardal McDermott is an Irish hurling manager and former player. He formerly played for and later managed the Donegal county team. His club is Burt.

McDermott played for the full final of the 2011 Lory Meagher Cup, which Donegal won at Croke Park. He played for the county until retiring in 2012. He first served under the management of Ray Durack, later succeeding him as county manager in 2015. He was appointed for a two-year term with the possibility of a third year, though he did not request this and left the post in 2017. McDermott led the county back to Division 2B of the National Hurling League in 2017, after the team were relegated the previous year.
