= 2009 Christy Ring Cup =

- Teams: 8
- Champions: Carlow (2nd title)
- Runners-up: Down

The 2009 Christy Ring Cup was the fifth edition of the Christy Ring Cup since its establishment by the Gaelic Athletic Association in 2005 and is the second-tier of Hurling for senior county teams (the All-Ireland Senior Hurling Championship is the first-tier trophy). It is contested by eight GAA county teams ranked 13–20 in the 2009 All-Ireland Senior Hurling Championship.

Eight county teams participate in the competition. The teams are Carlow, Derry, Down, Kerry, Mayo, Kildare, Westmeath and Wicklow.

The winning team was promoted to the All-Ireland Senior Hurling Championship 2010 and played for the Liam MacCarthy Cup.

On 11 July, Carlow retained the cup with a 1-15 to 0-14 victory over Down at Croke Park.

== Format ==
The tournament has a double elimination format - each team will play at least two games before being knocked out.

- The eight teams play four Round 1 matches.
  - The winners in Round 1 advance to Round 2A.
  - The losers in Round 1 go into Round 2B.
- There are two Round 2A matches.
  - The winners in Round 2A advance to the semi-finals.
  - The losers in Round 2A go into the quarter-finals.
- There are two Round 2B matches.
  - The winners in Round 2B advance to the quarter-finals.
  - The losers in Round 2B go into the relegation playoff.
    - The losers of the relegation playoff are relegated to the Nicky Rackard Cup 2010.
- There are two quarter-final matches between the Round 2A losers and Round 2B winners.
  - The winners of the quarter-finals advance to the semi-finals.
  - The losers of the quarter-finals are eliminated.
- There are two semi-final matches between the Round 2A winners and the quarter-final winners.
  - The winners of the semi-finals advance to the final.
  - The losers of the semi-finals are eliminated.
- The winners of the final win the Christy Ring Cup for 2009.

== Team changes ==
=== To Championship ===
Relegated from the All-Ireland Senior Hurling Championship

- None

Promoted from the Nicky Rackard Cup

- None

=== From Championship ===
Promoted to the All-Ireland Senior Hurling Championship

- None

Relegated to the Nicky Rackard Cup

- Armagh
- London
- Meath
- Roscommon

== Teams ==
=== General Information ===
County	Last Cup title	Last Provincial title	Last All-Ireland title	Position in 2008 Christy Ring Cup	Appearance
Carlow	2008	—	—	Winners	5th
Derry	—	2001	—	Semi-finalists	4th
Down	—	1997	—	Quarter-finalists	5th
Kerry	—	1891	1891	Quarter-finalists	5th
Kildare	—	—	—	Quarter-finalists	5th
Mayo	—	1909	—	Semi-finalists	5th
Westmeath	2007	—	—	Runners-up	4th
Wicklow	—	—	—	Quarter-finalists	5th

=== Personnel and kits ===
County	Manager	Captain(s)	Sponsor

== Bracket ==
Round 1 Round 2B
Derry	2-15
Wicklow	0-09
Wicklow	3-09
Carlow	4-16
Westmeath	2-21
Kildare	3-19
Mayo	2-20
Westmeath	0-15
Mayo	1-16
Kerry	3-11
Down	3-20
Derry	1-22

Round 2A; Quarter-finals
Kerry	4-21
Derry	2-12
Carlow	1-16
Kildare	1-13
Kildare	1-10
Mayo	1-16
Kerry	2-10
Down	3-11

Semi-finals
Kerry	2-11
Carlow (R)	6-10
Mayo	0-14
Down	4-21

Final
Carlow	1-15
Down	0-14
Relegation Playoff
Westmeath	3-36
Wicklow	1-06

=== Knockout phase ===
Match	Date	Venue	Team	Score	Team	Score
Round 1	May 9	Aughrim Park	Wicklow	3-9	Carlow	4-16
Round 1	May 9	Páirc Esler	Down	3-20	Derry	1-22
Round 1	May 9	Tralee	Kerry	3-11	Mayo	1-16
Round 1	May 9	Cusack Park	Westmeath	2-21	Kildare	3-19
Round 2A	May 16	Tralee	Kerry	2-10	Down	3-11
Round 2A	May 16	Newbridge	Kildare	1-13	Carlow	1-16
Round 2B	May 16	Crossmolina	Mayo	2-20	Westmeath	0-15
Round 2B	May 16	Swatragh	Derry	2-15	Wicklow	0-9
Quarter-final	May 23	Mullingar	Kerry	4-21	Derry	2-12
Quarter-final	May 23	Athleague	Kildare	1-10	Mayo	1-16
Semi-final	June 6	Dr Cullen Park	Carlow	1-15	Kerry	2-12
Semi-final	June 6	Páirc Esler	Down	4-21	Mayo	0-14
Semi-final replay	June 13	Tralee	Kerry	2-11	Carlow	6-10
Final	July 11	Croke Park	Down	0-14	Carlow	1-15

Date	Round	Venue	Team	Score	Team	Score
May 23	Relegation playoff	Clane	Westmeath	3-36	Wicklow	1-6

Wicklow are relegated to the Nicky Rackard Cup 2010 competition.

== Round 1 ==
=== Matches ===
9 May 2009
Round 1

Wicklow	3-9 - 4-16	Carlow
J Murphy (1-5), E Dunne (1-0), A O'Brien (1-0), G Bermingham, C Moorehouse (0-2 each).	Report	P Kehoe (2-4), C Doyle (1-3), D Roberts (1-2), J Hickey (0-4), M Brennan (0-2), E Coady (0-1).

Aughrim Park, Aughrim
Referee: P. Devereux (Kildare)

9 May 2009
Round 1

Down	3-20 - 1-22	Derry
G Johnston (2-3), P Branniff (0-7, 0-4 frees), E Clarke (1-1), J Coyle (0-3), S Wilson (0-3, 0-2 frees), C Woods (0-1), F Conway (0-1), R McGrattan (0-1).	Report	S Dodds 0-17, C Quinn 1-0, K Hinphey 0-2, B Dodds 0-2, S McNicholl 0-1.

Páirc Esler, Newry

9 May 2009
Round 1

Kerry	3-11 - 1-16	Mayo
S Brick 0-6, E McSweeney 0-3, S Young 1-2, J McCarthy 1-0, JM Dooley 1-0.		K Higgins 0-4, A Freeman 0-4, E Madigan 1-0, D Dowling 0-2, D McConn 0-2, D McDonnell 0-2, C Ryan 0-1, S Broderick 0-1.

Austin Stack Park, Tralee

9 May 2009
Round 1

Westmeath	2-21 - 3-19	Kildare
B Murtagh 1-10, A Devine 1-1, A Mitchell 0-3, D McNicholas 0-3, B Connaughton 0-2, K Cosgrove 0-1, D Carty 0-1.		D Harney 0-11, T Murphy 2-1, D Carter 1-0, A McAndrew 0-3, R Hoban 0-1, D Cafferty 0-1, M mOloney 0-1 N Ó Muineacháin 0-1.

Cusack Park, Mullingar

== Round 2 ==
=== Round 2A ===
9 May 2009
Round 2A

Kerry	2-10 - 3-11	Down
S Brick (0-9, eight frees), J McCarthy (2-0), JM Dooley (0-1).	Report	S Wilson (0-7, five frees), G Johnson (2-0), J Coyle (1-0), P Braniff (0-2), C Woods (0-1), M Óg Coulter (0-1).

Austin Stack Park, Tralee

9 May 2009
Round 2A

Kildare	1-13 - 1-16	Carlow
D Harney (1-5, 1-4 frees), T Murphy (0-5), A McAndrew (0-2), M Moloney (0-1).	Report	P Kehoe (0-8, five frees), C Doyle (1-2), A Gaule (0-3), M Brennan (0-1), D Roberts (0-1), J Hickey (0-1).

St. Conleth's Park, Newbridge

=== Round 2B ===
16 May 2009
Round 2B

Mayo	2-20 - 0-15	Westmeath
A Freeman (0-7, four frees), M Devaney (1-2), Keith Higgins (0-5, three frees), D McDonnell (1-0), S Broderick (0-2), B Higgins (0-1), P Higgins (0-1), E Madigan (0-1), Derek McConn (0-1).	Report	A Mitchell (0-6, frees), D McNicholas (0-3), R Jackson (0-2); C Jordan (0-1), B Murtagh (0-1, free), C Curley (0-1), D Kilcoyne (0-1).

Westport
Referee: T. Carroll (Offaly)

16 May 2009
Round 2B

Derry	2-15 - 0-9	Wicklow
R Convery 1-5 (0-1f, 0-1pen), A Kelly 1-2, S Dodds 0-3 (0-2f), O McCloskey 0-2, M Craig, P McCloskey, and E McGuckin 0-1 each.	Report	A Driver 0-4, J Murphy 0-3 (0-3f), G Bermingham and J Keogh 0-1 each.

Swatragh
Referee: T. McIntyre (Antrim)

== Quarter-finals ==
=== Matches ===
23 May 2009
Quarter-final

Mayo	1-16 - 1-10	Kildare
C Freeman 0-5, D Dowling 1-1, K Higgins 0-4f, D McDonnell 0-3, A Freeman 0-2f, C Ryan 0-1.	Report	D Harney 0-6 (4f), P Divilly 1-0, D Kennedy (‘65), T Murphy, A McAndrew, M Maloney 0-1 each.

Athleague
Referee: T. Ryan (Tipperary)

23 May 2009
Quarter-final

Kerry	4-21 - 2-12	Derry
S Brick (0-15, 6f, 1 ‘65’), J Dooley (4-0), E Sweeney (0-4), J Fitzgerald (0-1), J Casey (0-1).	Report	R Convery (1-7, 0-6f), O McCloskey (0-5, 2f, 3 ‘65’), M Scullen (1-0).

Cusack Park, Mullingar
Referee: S. Whelan (Wexford)

== Semi-finals ==
=== Matches ===
6 June 2009
Semi-final

Down	4-21 - 0-14	Mayo
G Johnston 1-5 (0-1f), S Wilson 0-7 (0-3f, 0-1 '65', 0-1 pen), J Coyle 1-3, P Braniff 1-2 (0-1f), E Clarke, 1-1, C Woods 0-2, M Ennis 0-1.	Report	A Freeman (0-4f), K Higgins (0-3f, 0-1 pen) 0-6 each, D McConn, E Madigan 0-1 each.

Páirc Esler, Newry
Referee: A. Stapleton (Laois)

6 June 2009
Semi-final

Carlow	1-15 - 2-12	Kerry
Paudie Kehoe 1-6 (0-6fs), J Hickey 0-4 (1 sideline), R Foley 0-2, S Kavanagh 0-2 (65s), M Brennan 0-1.	Report	S Brick 1-5 (1-0 pen, 0-3fs), JM Dooley 1-3, E Sweeney 0-2, B Brick 0-1, G O’Brien 0-1.

Dr. Cullen Park, Carlow
Referee: T. Carroll (Offaly)

13 June 2009
Semi-final
Replay

Kerry	2-11 - 6-10	Carlow
S Brick (0-7, six frees), JM Dooley (1-1), J McCarthy (1-0), E Sweeney (0-1), B Brick (0-1); G O’Brien (0-1).	Report	R Foley (2-2), C Doyle (2-1), P Kehoe (1-2, 1-0 pen, 0-1 free), A Gaule (1-1), R Dunbar (0-1), M Brennan (0-1), E Byrne (0-1), S Kavanagh (0-1, 65).

Austin Stack Park, Tralee
Referee: D. O'Driscoll (Limerick)

== Final ==
=== Final ===
11 July 2009
Final

Carlow	1-15 - 0-14	Down
R Foley 1-03, P Kehoe 0-05 (0-04f), C Doyle 0-02 (0-01f), S Kavanagh (0-01 '65'), A Gaule, E Coady, E Byrne, J Coady 0-01 each.	Report	S Wilson 0-07 (0-07f), P Braniff 0-04, C O'Prey, J Coyle, A Higgins 0-01 each.

Croke Park, Dublin
Referee: T. Ryan (Tipperary)

== Relegation playoff ==
Date	Winner		Loser		Venue
Date	County	Score	County	Score	Venue
May 23	Westmeath	3-36	Wicklow	1-06	Clane

Wicklow are relegated to the Nicky Rackard Cup 2010 competition.

== Miscellaneous ==
- Armagh competed in the Christy Ring Cup for the first time.
