= 2010 Nicky Rackard Cup =

- Dates: 5 June – 3 July 2010
- Teams: 8
- Champions: Armagh
- Runners-up: London

Tournament statistics
- Matches played: 13
- Goals scored: 55 (4.23 per match)
- Points scored: 385 (29.62 per match)

The 2010 Nicky Rackard Cup is the 6th annual third-tier hurling competition organised by the Gaelic Athletic Association. The teams competing are Armagh, Fingal, London, Louth, Monaghan, Roscommon, Sligo and Tyrone. The 2009 champions, Meath were promoted to the Christy Ring Cup for 2010, and did not have the opportunity to defend their title. 2009 Lory Meagher Cup champions, Tyrone, were promoted to play in the Nicky Rackard Cup this year. Due to a disagreement over promotion and relegation from the All-Ireland series, no team was relegated from the 2009 Christy Ring Cup or 2009 Nicky Rackard Cup for the 2010 season.

== Team changes ==
=== To Championship ===
Promoted from the Lory Meagher Cup

- Tyrone

=== From Championship ===
Promoted to the Christy Ring Cup

- Meath

== Format ==
=== Structure ===
The tournament has a double eliminator format - each team will play at least two games before being knocked out.

- The eight teams play four Round 1 matches.
  - The winners in Round 1 advance to Round 2A.
  - The losers in Round 1 go into Round 2B.
- There are two Round 2A matches.
  - The winners in Round 2A advance to the semi-finals.
  - The losers in Round 2A go into the quarter-finals.
- There are two Round 2B matches.
  - The winners in Round 2B advance to the quarter-finals.
  - The losers in Round 2B go into the relegation playoff.
    - The losers of the relegation playoff are relegated to the Lory Meagher Cup for 2011.
- There are two quarter-final matches between the Round 2A losers and Round 2B winners.
  - The winners of the quarter-finals advance to the semi-finals.
  - The losers of the quarter-finals are eliminated.
- There are two semi-final matches between the Round 2A winners and the quarter-final winners.
  - The winners of the semi-finals advance to the final.
  - The losers of the semi-finals are eliminated.
- The winners of the final win the Nicky Rackard Cup for 2010 and are promoted to the Christy Ring Cup for 2011.

== Fixtures ==
=== Round 1 ===
5 June 2010
Round 1

Armagh	3-15 - 1-12	Fingal
P McCormack 1-6, R Gaffney 1-2, G Enright 1-1, P Breen 0-3, B Breen 0-2, B Mc Naughton 0-1	Report	E McCabe 1-2, P Daly, C Foley, B McCarthy 0-2 each, W Lawrence, R McGarry, P McAllister, M Ormonde 0-1 each

Crossmaglen
Referee: R. Mathews (Antrim)

5 June 2010
Round 1

Roscommon	4-16 - 0-18	Monaghan
D Dolan 0-8, J Coyne, N Kilroy 1-1 each, G Fallon, E Kenny 1-0 each, M Kelly, K Conneely 0-2 each, M Connaughton, D Loughnane 0-1 each	Report	M McHugh 0-14, B Phelan 0-2, R Meegan, M Lennon 0-1 each

Athleague
Referee: M. Haverty (Galway)

5 June 2010
Round 1

Louth	3-17 - 1-07	Tyrone
S Callan 1-2, D Horan 1-1, K McNally 1-0, D Dunne, D O'Sullivan, G Smyth 0-3 each, S Fennell 0-2, M Wallace, W Morrissey, R Byrne 0-1 each	Report	Justin Kelly 1-4, D O'Leary, C McHugh, T Hughes 0-1 each

Dundalk
Referee: G. Duffy (Antrim)

5 June 2010
Round 1

London	2-16 - 3-05	Sligo
M Finn 1-6, T Twomey 1-0, D Maher 0-3, J Reddan, R O'Connell 0-2 each, M Mythen, G Power, M Lismore 0-1 each	Report	R Molloy 3-0, A Cawley 0-4 (0-4f), L Cadden 0-1

Ruislip
Referee: J. O Mahony (Limerick)

=== Round 2A ===
12 June 2010
Round 2A

Louth	1-08 - 0-17	Roscommon
G Smyth 0-4, D Murphy 1-0, D O'Sullivan 0-2, D Horan, S Fennell 0-1 each	Report	D Dolan 0-7, N Kilroy 0-4, P Kelly 0-2, J Moran, K Conneely, M Connaughton, J Coyne 0-1 each

Dundalk
Referee: O. Elliott (Antrim)

12 June 2010
Round 2A

Armagh	4-26 - 2-23 AET	London
P Breen 0-10, J Corvan 2-0, P McCormack 1-2, B Breen 0-4, F Bradley 1-0, M Lennon, R Gaffney 0-3 each, B McCann 0-2, G Enright, B McNaughton 0-1 each	Report	M Finn 0-11, J Reddan 1-2, A Fitzgerald 0-4, M Fitzsimmons 1-0, K Walsh 0-3, M Mythen 0-2, R O'Connell 0-1

Crossmaglen
Referee: D. McGee (Down)

=== Round 2B ===
12 June 2010
Round 2B

Fingal	1-18 - 2-09	Tyrone
C Foley 0-7, B McCarthy 1-2, P McAllister 0-3, M Ormonde 0-2, R McGarry, JM Sheridan, E McCabe, C O'Mahony 0-1 each	Report	C Grogan 2-1, P O'Connor, R Woods, A Kelly 0-2 each, G Fox, L Moore 0-1 each

Swords, County Dublin
Referee: R. Mathews (Antrim)

12 June 2010
Round 2B

Sligo	3-10 - 0-13	Monaghan
C Herity 1-4, D Burke 1-2, C Hackett 1-0, L Reidy 0-2, A Cawley, N Cadden 0-1 each	Report	M McHugh 0-10, B McGuigan 0-2, A MacSuibhne 0-1

Markievicz Park, Sligo
Referee: P. Greene (Galway)

=== Quarter-finals ===
19 June 2010
Quarter-final

Louth	2-15 - 3-18	Sligo
G Smyth 0-8, K McNally 1-2, S Fennell 1-1, D Murphy 0-2, S Callan, D O'Sullivan 0-1 each	Report	C Herity 0-13, R Molloy, D Burke 1-2 each, M Gordon 1-0, W Gill 0-1

Pearse Park, Longford
Referee: M. Haverty (Galway)

19 June 2010
Quarter-final

London	5-17 - 1-11	Fingal
M Finn 1-5, M Mythen, T Twomey 2-1 each, R O'Connell 0-6, A Fitzgerald 0-2, D Maher, D Kinsella 0-1 each	Report	C Foley 0-5, M Ormonde 0-3, B McCarthy 1-0, E McCabe 0-2, R McGarry 0-1

Parnell Park, Dublin
Referee: D. Murphy (Wexford)

=== Semi-finals ===
26 June 2010
Semi-final

Armagh	5-18 - 1-18	Sligo
P Breen 1-7, P McCormack, J Corvan 2-2 each, K McKernan 0-3, R Gaffney 0-2, F McMullan, G Enright 0-1 each	Report	C Herity 1-10, D Burke, L Reidy, A Cawley 0-2 each, R Cox, P Quinn, T Cawley 0-1 each

Breffni Park, Cavan
Referee: G. Duffy (Antrim)

26 June 2010
Semi-final

Roscommon	1-14 - 1-15	London
J Coyne 1-2, D Dolan 0-3, M Connaughton, M Kelly, G Fallon 0-2 each, J Moran, N Kilroy, K Conneely 0-1 each	Report	M Finn 1-9, M Mythen 0-3, T Twomey, A Fitzgerald, R O'Connell 0-1 each

Parnell Park, Dublin
Referee: E. Morris (Dublin)

=== Final ===
3 July 2010
Final

Armagh	3-15 - 3-14	London
P Breen 2-4, R Gaffney 1-2, P McCormack 0-3, J Corvan 0-2, B Mallon, B Breen, C Carragher, M Lennon 0-1 each	Report	M Finn 1-6, D Maher 2-2, R O'Connell 0-3, M Mythen 0-2, A Fitzgerald 0-1

Croke Park, Dublin
Referee: D. Magee (Down)

=== Relegation play-off ===
19 June 2010
Relegation Playoff

Monaghan	defeated	Tyrone

Round 1 Round 2B
Armagh	3-15
Fingal	1-12
London	2-16
Sligo	3-05
Sligo	3-10
Monaghan	0-13
Fingal	1-18
Tyrone	2-09
Roscommon	4-16
Monaghan	0-18
Louth	3-17
Tyrone	1-07

Round 2A; Quarter-finals
Armagh	4-26
London	2-23
Louth	2-15
Sligo	3-18
Fingal	1-11
London	5-17
Roscommon	0-17
Louth	1-08

Semi-finals
Armagh	5-18
Sligo	1-18
London	1-15
Roscommon	1-14

Final
Armagh	3-15
London	3-14
Relegation Playoff
Tyrone	L
Monaghan	W

== Statistics ==
- First hat-trick of the competition: Robert Molloy for Sligo against London
- Widest winning margin: 18 points
  - London 5-17 - 1-11 Fingal (Quarter-final)
- Most goals in a match: 6
  - Armagh 4-26 - 2-23 London (Round 2A)
  - London 5-17 - 1-11 Fingal (Quarter-final)
  - Armagh 5-18 - 1-18 Sligo (Semi-final)
  - Armagh 3-15 - 3-14 London (Final)
- Most points in a match: 49
  - Armagh 4-26 - 2-23 London (Round 2A)
- Most goals by one team in a match: 5
  - London 5-17 - 1-11 Fingal (Quarter-final)
  - Armagh 5-18 - 1-18 Sligo (Semi-final)
- Most goals scored by a losing team: 3
  - Sligo 3-05 - 2-16 London (Round 1)
  - London 3-14 - 3-15 Armagh (Final)
- Most points scored by a losing team: 23
  - London 2-23 - 4-26 Armagh (Round 2A)
