= Donegal county hurling team =

Hurling team

The Donegal county hurling team represents Donegal in hurling and is governed by Donegal GAA, the county board of the Gaelic Athletic Association. The team competes in the Christy Ring Cup and the National Hurling League (currently Division 2B, often also in Division 3A).

Donegal's home ground is MacCumhaill Park, Ballybofey. The team's manager is Mickey McCann.

The team last won the Ulster Senior Championship in 1932, but has never won the All-Ireland Senior Championship or the National League.

== History ==
Donegal has three senior and four junior Ulster hurling titles, the last senior win coming in 1932.

Donegal has a residue of pre-GAA hurling. The Burt Hibernians brought Donegal the 1906 Ulster Senior Hurling Championship, defeating Antrim by 25 points to one. Burt later played in Derry. In 1923 Donegal fielded a team of three natives augmented with Gardaí and customs officers from hurling counties to win its second Ulster SHC. When they lined out for the semi-final, wearing blue jerseys against Limerick on a cold, miserable day in Croke Park, numbers were worn by the players for the first time to help the spectators to distinguish them. The team trailed 5–4 to nil at half-time and lost 7–4 to 0–1.

Donegal was National Hurling League Division Three champion in 2001.

Led by Eamon Campbell, Donegal reached the final of the 2006 Nicky Rackard Cup, the first time the team had achieved this, only to be defeated by Derry.

The county reached the final of the 2009 Lory Meagher Cup, only to be defeated by Tyrone.

Donegal won the 2011 Lory Meagher Cup.

Ray Durack was manager of the county team from January 2012 until May 2015. He led Donegal to the 2013 Nicky Rackard Cup. As Nicky Rackard winners, Donegal would have expected to compete in the 2014 Christy Ring Cup. However, due to restructure of the competitions, Donegal were not promoted to the 2014 Christy Ring Cup. Durack then brought the county to Division 2B of the National Hurling League in 2014 (their highest league ranking in team history). Ardal McDermott succeeded Durack as manager, serving between 2015 and 2017 and leading the county back to Division 2B of the National Hurling League in 2017 (as Division 3A champions), after the team were relegated the previous year.

On 25 October 2017, the county board announced Mickey McCann's appointment as senior manager on a two-year contract, with the possibility of a third year in charge also mentioned. The county board had specifically identified him after all candidates nominated for the position were rejected as unsuitable. McCann led Donegal to first competitive victories over Derry and Down in the 2018 National Hurling League. The 2018 Nicky Rackard Cup followed.

Relegation from 2B to 3A followed in 2019, promotion to 2B followed in 2020.

Donegal defeated Mayo in the 2020 Nicky Rackard Cup Final; in doing so, the county became the first to win the competition on three occasions. However, the 2020 win did not secure passage back to the 2021 Christy Ring Cup, a condition that was not made clear until shortly before the final.

== Panel ==
- Declan Coulter
- Danny Cullen
- Ronan McDermott (c; as of 2022)
- Conor Parke

== Management team ==
As announced on 25 October 2017:

- Manager: Mickey McCann
- Trainer/coach: Gabriel O'Kane
- Another selector yet to be confirmed
- Backroom team: Martin McGrath, Martin Coyle

== Managerial history ==
- c. 1906–200?: ?
- c. 2005: Darren McDermott (player-manager)
- 2006–2009: Eamon Campbell
  - Campbell died on 7 June 2022.
- 2010–2011: Andrew Wallace
- 2012–2015: Ray Durack
- 2015–2017: Ardal McDermott
- 2017–: Mickey McCann

== Players ==
=== Captaincy ===
- 2013: Joe Boyle
- 2014: Joe Boyle
- 2015:
- 2016:
- 2017:
- 2018:
- 2019:
- Until 2020: Danny Cullen
- 2020: Seán McVeigh
- 2021:
- 2022: Ronan McDermott
- 2023:
- 2024:
- 2025:
- 2026:

=== Awards ===
- Champion 15:

denotes that a player also won Player of the Year for the year in question.

2018: Declan Coulter , Stephen Gillespie
2020: Seán McVeigh, Danny Cullen
2023: Luke White, Danny Cullen^{2nd}
2024: Stephen Gillespie,^{2nd} Gerard Gilmore, Liam McKinney

Champion 15 by club

- 2018 – Coulter (Setanta), Gillespie (?)
- 2020 – Cullen (Setanta), McVeigh (St Eunan's)
- 2023 – White (Carndonagh), Cullen (Setanta)
- 2024 – Gillespie (?), Gilmore (?), McKinney (?)

Further detail, including clubs and awards from between 2006 and 2018:

Nicky Rackard Cup All Star Awards

- 2006 – Danny Cullen (Setanta), Aiden Begley (Aodh Ruadh)
- 2007 – Ger O'Dwyer (Setanta)
- 2008 – Mickey McCann (Burt)

Lory Meagher Cup Champion 15 Awards

- 2009 – Jamesie Donnelly (Seán MacCumhaills)
- 2010 – Mark Patton (Four Masters), Ardal McDermott (Burt), Paul O'Brien (Burt)
- 2011 – Enda McDermott (Burt), Joe Boyle (Burt), Niall Campbell (Burt), Colm Breathnach (St Eunan's)

Nicky Rackard Cup All Star Awards

- 2012 – Ardal McDermott (Burt), Lee Henderson (Seán MacCumhaills)
- 2013 – Christy McDermott (Burt), Danny Cullen (Setanta), Seán McVeigh (St Eunan's), Lee Henderson (Seán MacCumhaills)
- 2014 – Justin McGee (Sean MacCumhaills), Paul Sheridan
- 2015 – Ronan McDermott (Burt), Jamesie Donnelly (Seán MacCumhaills)
- 2016 – Danny Cullen (Setanta), Pádraig Doherty (Burt)

=== Player of the Year ===
1989 Eugene Sherry

- 2013 Danny Cullen
- 2015 Ronan McDermott
- 2017 Davin Flynn
- 2018 Padraic Doherty (Burt)
- 2019 Jack O'Loughlin (Buncrana)

== Honours ==
Official honours, with additions noted.

=== National ===
- Nicky Rackard Cup
  - (gold) Winners (3): 2013, 2018, 2020
  - (silver) Runners-up (3): 2001, 2003, 2006
- Lory Meagher Cup
  - (gold) Winners (1): 2011
  - (silver) Runners-up (2): 2009, 2010
- National Hurling League
  - (gold) Winners (1): Division 3: 2001
  - (gold) Winners (1): Division 3A: 2017

=== Provincial ===
- Ulster Senior Hurling Championship
  - (gold) Winners (3): 1906, 1923, 1932
  - (silver) Runners-up (10): 1903, 1910, 1924, 1925, 1929, 1933, 1934, 1937, 1938, 1945
- Ulster Senior Hurling Shield
  - (gold) Winners (1): 2016
- Ulster Junior Hurling Championship
  - (gold) Winners (6): 1947, 1948, 1972, 1989, 2001, 2003
- Conor McGurk Cup
  - (gold) Winners (2): 2023, 2024
  - (silver) Runners-up (1): 2022
