= 2009 Lory Meagher Cup =

Hurling competition

- Dates: 6 June — 11 July
- Teams: 8
- Champions: Tyrone (1st title)
- Runners-up: Donegal
- Promoted: Tyrone

Tournament statistics
- Matches played: 13

The 2009 Lory Meagher Cup was the inaugural edition of the Lory Meagher Cup since its establishment by the Gaelic Athletic Association as the fourth-tier of Hurling for senior county teams (the All-Ireland Senior Hurling Championship is the first-tier trophy). It was contested by eight GAA county teams ranked 29–36 in the 2009 All-Ireland Senior Hurling Championship.

Seven county teams and one regional team took part in the competition. The teams were Warwickshire, Longford, Fermanagh, Leitrim, Cavan, South Down, Tyrone and Donegal.

On 11 July, Tyrone won the inaugural Lory Meagher Cup, with a 5–11 to 3–16 win over Donegal at Croke Park. As the winners of the 2009 Lory Meagher Cup, Tyrone were promoted to the 2010 Nicky Rackard Cup.

== Format ==
The tournament had a double elimination format: each team played at least two games before being knocked out.

- The eight teams played four Round 1 matches.
  - The winners in Round 1 advanced to Round 2A.
  - The losers in Round 1 went into Round 2B.
- There were two Round 2A matches.
  - The winners in Round 2A advanced to the semi-finals.
  - The losers in Round 2A went into the quarter-finals.
- There were two Round 2B matches.
  - The winners in Round 2B advanced to the quarter-finals.
  - The losers in Round 2B were eliminated.
- There were two quarter-final matches between the Round 2A losers and Round 2B winners.
  - The winners of the quarter-finals advanced to the semi-finals.
  - The losers of the quarter-finals were eliminated.
- There were two semi-final matches between the Round 2A winners and the quarter-final winners.
  - The winners of the semi-finals advanced to the final.
  - The losers of the semi-finals were eliminated.
- The winners of the final won the Lory Meagher Cup for 2009.

== Teams ==
County	Last Provincial Title	Last All-Ireland Title	Position in 2008 Championship	Appearance
Cavan	—	—	Quarter-finals (Nicky Rackard Cup)	1st
Donegal	1932	—	Group Stage (Nicky Rackard Cup)	1st
Fermanagh	—	—	Group Stage (Nicky Rackard Cup)	1st
Leitrim	—	—	Quarter-finals (Nicky Rackard Cup)	1st
Longford	—	—	Group Stage (Nicky Rackard Cup)	1st
South Down	—	—	Quarter-finals (Nicky Rackard Cup)	1st
Tyrone	—	—	Quarter-finals (Nicky Rackard Cup)	1st
Warwickshire	—	—	Group Stage (Nicky Rackard Cup)	1st

== Bracket ==
Round 1 Round 2B
Fermanagh	0-14
Leitrim	1-12
Tyrone	3-09
South Down	5-06
Cavan	3-09
Fermanagh	3-15
Tyrone	3-19
Warwickshire	1-16
Warwickshire	0-14
Longford	1-14
Donegal	0-20
Cavan	1-12

Round 2A; Quarter-finals
Leitrim	1-14
South Down	2-14
Fermanagh	0-08
Donegal	3-20
Tyrone	1-20
Leitrim	3-08
Longford	5-15
Donegal	2-22

Semi-finals
South Down	2-11
Donegal	1-15
Longford	4-09
Tyrone	3-16

Final
Donegal	3-16
Tyrone	5-11

== Round 1 ==
=== Round 1 ===
6 June 2009 Round 1	Tyrone	3–9 – 5–6	South Down	Healy Park
	J Kelly 0–6, M Kane 1–0, A Kelly 1–0, J Treacy 1–0, R O'Neill 0–2, L Moore 0–1.		A Brown 4–0, M Magee 1–0, J Brown 0–2, J Murphy 0–2, P McAleenan 0–1, L Morgan 0–1.	Referee: G Duffy (Antrim)

6 June 2009 Round 1	Fermanagh	0–14 – 1–12	Leitrim	Brewster Park
	R Bogue 0–12, D McGrary 0–1, C Kehoe 0–1.	Report	C Cunniffe 0–7, C Burns 1–0, J Clancy 0–2, D McGovern 0–1, M Burns 0–1, C Hayes 0–1.

6 June 2009 Round 1	Donegal	0–20 – 1–12	Cavan	O'Donnell Park
	K Campbell 0–15, N Campbell 0–2, S McVeigh 0–1, P Hannigan 0–1, C Matthewson 0–1, L Henderson 0–1.		P Sheridan 0–7, M Carr 1–0, P Brady 0–2, K Brennan 0–2, B Dalton 0–1.	Referee: O Elliott (Antrim)

7 June 2009 Round 1	Warwickshire	0–14 – 1–14	Longford	Páirc na hÉireann
			C Egan (0–06), D Tanner (1–01),

== Round 2 ==
=== Round 2A ===
13 June 2009 Round 2A	Leitrim	1–14 – 2–14	South Down	Páirc Seán Mac Diarmada
	C Cunniffe (0–7, 6f), M Burns (1–2), J Glancy (0–4), D McGovern (0–1).		A Browne (2–3), E McGuinness (0–5), L Morgan (0–4, 3f), J Murphy (0–2, 1f).	Referee: A Carroll (Offaly)

13 June 2009 Round 2A	Longford	5–15 – 2–22	Donegal	Hugh Devine Park
	J O'Brien (3–1), J Minnock (2–2), D Tanner (0–7, all frees), C Egan (0–5, four frees).	Report	K Campbell (1–11, 10 frees), S McVeigh (0–4), C McLoughlin (1–0), S Boyle (0–2), L Henderson (0–2), C Mathewson (0–1), P Hannigan (0–1), D Cullen (0–1).

=== Round 2B ===
13 June 2009 Round 2B	Tyrone	3–19 – 1–16	Warwickshire	Healy Park
	J Kelly (0–12, 6f), C Grogan (1–3), P O'Connor (1–1), M Kelly (1–0), A Kelly (0–1), S McKiver (0–1), T Hughes (0–1).			Referee: E Elliot (Antrim)

13 June 2009 Round 2B	Cavan	3–9 – 3–15	Fermanagh	Breffni Park
	P Sheridan (0–9, six frees, one 65), A Sheridan (1–0), E Dalton (1–0), M McEntee (1–0).	Report	S Corrigan (0–8, five frees), B McGarry (1–1), D McGarry (0–4, two 65s, one free), A Breslin (1–0), D Slevin (1–0), M Teague (0–1), D Curran (0–1).	Referee: D McGee (Down)

== Quarter-finals ==
=== Quarter-finals ===
20 June 2009 Quarter-final	Tyrone	1–20 – 3–8	Leitrim	Healy Park
	C Grogan 1–3, J Kelly 0–6 (3f), P O'Connor 0–5, T Hughes, S McKiver 0–2 each, G Fox, J Kerr 0–1 each.	Report	M Burns 2–0, D McGovern 1–0, C Cunniffe 0–7 (0–7f), J Glancy 0–1.	Referee: J O'Rourke (Monaghan)

21 June 2009 Quarter-final	Fermanagh	0–8 – 3–20	Donegal	Brewster Park
	S Corrigan 0–3, B McGarry and K Kehoe 0–2 each, B Smyth 0–1.	Report	K Campbell 0–9, C Mathewson and S McVeigh 1–2 each, L Henderson 1–1, N Campbell 0–3, G O'Dwyer 0–2, S Boyle 0–1.

== Semi-finals ==
=== Semi-finals ===
27 June 2009 Semi-final	South Down	2–11 – 1–15	Donegal	Ballela
	P P McCartan 2–1, L Morgan 0–5 (5f), P Kelly, A Browne, E McGuinness, J Murphy, D Morgan 0–1 each.	Report	K Campbell 0–8 (5f), S McVeigh 1–1, L Henderson, N Campbell 0–2 each; D Cullen and C Mathewson 0–1 each.	Referee: A Stapleton (Laois)

27 June 2009 Semi-final	Longford	4–9 – 3–16	Tyrone	Hugh Devine Park
	J O'Brien, G Ghee, C Egan (0–2f) 1–2 each, D Tanner 0–3 (0–3f), C Finnucane 1–0.	Report	J Kelly 1–11, (0–10f), C Grogan 1–3 (1–0 pen), G Fox 1–0, P O'Connor, S. Donnelly 0–1 each.	Referee: M O'Connor (Limerick)

== Final ==
=== Final ===
11 July 2009 Final	Donegal	3–16 – 5–11	Tyrone	Croke Park
	K Campbell 0–7 (5f, 1 '65); D Cullen 1–1; L Henderson P Hannigan 1–0 each; S McVeigh, M McCann 0–2 each; S Boyle, C Breathnach, N Campbell, J Donnelly 0–1 each.	Report	J Kelly 1–4 (4f, 1 '65); C Grogan 0–4; S McKiver 1–1; R O'Neill 2–0, G Fox, P McMahon 1–0 each, D Lavery, P O'Connor 0–1 each.	Referee: T Carroll (Offaly)

== Statistics ==
=== Top scorers ===
==== Overall ====
Rank	Player	County	Tally	Total	Matches	Average
1	Kevin Campbell	Donegal	1–50	53	5	10.60
2	Justin Kelly	Tyrone	2–39	44	5	8.80
3	Aidan Brown	South Down	6–04	22	3	7.33
3	Conor Grogan	Tyrone	3–13	22	4	5.50
4	Clement Cunniffe	Leitrim	0–21	21	3	7.00

=== Scoring events ===
- Widest winning margin: 21 points
  - Fermanagh 0-08 - 3-20 Donegal (Quarter-finals)
- Most goals in a match: 8
  - Tyrone 3-09 - 5-06 South Down (Round 1)
  - Donegal 3-16 - 5-11 Tyrone (Final)
- Most points in a match: 37
  - Longford 5-15 - 2-22 Donegal (Round 2A)
- Most goals by one team in a match: 5
  - Tyrone 3-09 - 5-06 South Down (Round 1)
  - Longford 5-15 - 2-22 Donegal (Round 2A)
  - Donegal 3-16 - 5-11 Tyrone (Final)
- Most points by one team in a match: 22
  - Longford 5-15 - 2-22 Donegal (Round 2A)
- Highest aggregate score: 58 points
  - Longford 5-15 - 2-22 Donegal (Round 2A)
- Lowest aggregate score: 29 points
  - Fermanagh 0-14 - 1-12 Leitrim (Round 1)

== Miscellaneous ==
- Tyrone win their first ever national championship
- Tyrone win their first championship in 10 years, last winning the 1999 Ulster Junior Hurling Championship.

== See also ==
- 2009 All-Ireland Senior Hurling Championship
- 2009 Ulster Senior Hurling Championship
- 2009 Christy Ring Cup (Tier 2)
- 2009 Nicky Rackard Cup (Tier 3)
