= Setanta Hurling Club (Donegal) =

- Setanta Iomána
- County: Donegal
- Colours: Green and black
- Grounds: Setanta Park
- Coordinates: 54°47′10″N 7°42′09″W

Playing kits
Standard colours

Senior Club Championships
	All Ireland	Ulster champions	Donegal champions
Hurling:	0	0	17

Setanta Hurling Club is a Gaelic Athletic Association club located near Killygordon, County Donegal, Ireland. The club is solely concerned with the game of hurling.

As of 2026, the club competes in the Donegal SHC.

== History ==
Setanta won its first Donegal SHC title in 1973. Since then, it has won a total of 17 club titles, including a six-in-a-row between 1983 and 1988.

The club won its first Ulster Junior Club Hurling Championship title in 2017.

Gary McGettigan managed Setanta to the 2022 Ulster Junior Club Hurling Championship title.

The following season, Setanta won the 2023 Ulster Intermediate Club Hurling Championship, thus becoming the first team from Donegal to win the competition.

== Notable players ==
- Kevin Campbell — Nicky Rackard Cup winner
- Declan Coulter — selected as an All Star replacement, scored 1–6 in a game in Dubai and named man of the match
- Danny Cullen — captained Ireland in the Shinty–Hurling International Series
- Donal Reid — one of the winners from the 1992 All-Ireland Senior Football Championship final, he also played hurling for Setanta

== Honours ==
- Donegal Senior Hurling Championship (18): 1973, 1974, 1980, 1981, 1983, 1984, 1985, 1986, 1987, 1988, 1990, 2007, 2008, 2017, 2019, 2020, 2022, 2025
- Ulster Intermediate Club Hurling Championship (1) 2023
- Ulster Junior Club Hurling Championship (2): 2017, 2022
