= 2020 Nicky Rackard Cup =

- Dates: 24 October – 22 November 2020
- Teams: 7
- Champions: Donegal (3rd title); Seán McVeigh (captain); Mickey McCann (manager)
- Runners-up: Mayo; Stephen Coyne (captain); Derek Walsh (manager)
- Relegated: Longford, Monaghan

Tournament statistics
- Matches played: 10
- Goals scored: 29 (2.9 per match)
- Points scored: 329 (32.9 per match)

The 2020 Nicky Rackard Cup is the 16th staging of the Nicky Rackard Cup hurling championship since its establishment by the Gaelic Athletic Association in 2005. It is the fourth tier hurling as of 2020.

Warwickshire were supposed to compete in the Rackard Cup but did not due to the impact of the COVID-19 pandemic on Gaelic games. The championship was scheduled to begin in May 2020 but was delayed until 24 October 2020.

Donegal were the winners, defeating Mayo in the final after earlier wins over Longford, Armagh and Tyrone.

== Team changes ==
=== To Championship ===
Relegated from the Christy Ring Cup

- Donegal

Promoted from the Lory Meagher Cup

- Leitrim

=== From Championship ===
Promoted to the Christy Ring Cup

- Sligo

Relegated to the Lory Meagher Cup

- Louth

== Format ==
Seven teams compete in the 2020 Nicky Rackard Cup.

- Six teams play each in the three Round 1 games. One team receives a bye to Round 2A.
- The three Round 1 winners, plus the team that received a bye, play in Round 2A.
  - The two Round 2A winners advance to the semi-finals.
  - The losers of the game between a Round 1 winner and the bye-receiving team goes into Round 2B.
- The three Round 1 losers and one of the Round 2A losers play in Round 2B.
  - The Round 2B winners advance to the semi-finals.
- The semi-finals are played between the two Round 2A winners and the two Round 2B winners.
- The final is between the two semi-final winners.

== Round 1 ==
24 October 2020 Round 1	Armagh	1-21 – 0-12	Leitrim	Armagh
		Report		Stadium: Athletic Grounds

24 October 2020 Round 1	Donegal	2-13 – 1-14	Longford	Letterkenny
		Report		Stadium: O'Donnell Park

24 October 2020 Round 1	Monaghan	2-10 – 3-32	Mayo	Clontibret
		Report		Stadium: Clontibret O'Neills GAA

== Round 2 ==
=== Round 2A ===
The Round 1 winners are joined by Tyrone, who received a bye.

31 October 2020 Round 2A	Tyrone	0-9 – 1-23	Mayo	Omagh
14:00 GMT	D Casey (0-7, 2 65, 2f), K Morgan (0-1), B Molloy (0-1)	Report	S Boland (0-8, 5f), J Coyne (1-2), C Scahill (0-3), A Phillips (0-2), S Kenny (0-2f), B Morley (0-2), E Delaney (0-1), C Freeman (0-1), D Kenny (0-1), C Phillips (0-1), S Regan (0-1)	Stadium: Healy Park; Attendance: 0 Referee: Colum Cunning

31 October 2020 Round 2A	Donegal	3-13 – 1-9	Armagh	Letterkenny
13:30 GMT		Report		Stadium: O'Donnell Park; Attendance: 0 Referee: James Clarke

=== Round 2B ===
The Round 1 losers are joined by Tyrone, who lost their Round 2A game.

7 November 2020 Round 2B	Longford	0-12 – 1-11	Leitrim	Longford
13:30 GMT				Stadium: Glennon Brothers Pearse Park; Attendance: 0

7 November 2020 Round 2B	Monaghan	1-12 – 2-19	Tyrone	Clontibret
13:30 GMT				Stadium: Clontibret O'Neills GAA; Attendance: 0

== Semi-finals ==
The Round 2A winners play the Round 2B winners.

14 November 2020 Semi-Final	Mayo	3-23 – 1-11	Leitrim	Castlebar
13:30 GMT	S. Boland 1-10 (0-9f), S. Kenny 0-4 (0-1 65', 0-1f), C. Freeman 1-0, E. Delaney 0-2, A. Phillips (0-2), L. Lavin and B. Hunt 0-1 each	Report	C. Moreton 1-0, K. McDermott 0-4 (0-1f), G. O’Hagan 0-2f, C. French 0-2, B. Murray, C. Beirne, Z. Moradi 0-1 each	Stadium: MacHale Park; Attendance: 0 Referee: Richie Fitzsimons

14 November 2020 Semi-Final	Donegal	3-25 – 1-21	Tyrone	Letterkenny
13:30 GMT		Report		Stadium: O'Donnell Park; Attendance: 0 Referee: Colm McDonald

== Final ==
22 November 2020 Final	Mayo	0-21 – 3-18	Donegal	Dublin
13:30 GMT	Shane Boland 0-11 (10f); Brian Morley, Cathal Freeman 0-2 each; Seán Kenny (’65), Eoin Delaney, Jason Coyne, Corey Scahill, Adrian Phillips 0-1 each; 0-1 own point	Report	Declan Coulter 0-8 (6f); Davin Flynn 1-3; Joe Boyle, Ritchie Ryan 1-1 each; Danny Cullen 0-3; Ronan McDermott, Gerard Gilmore 0-1 each	Stadium: Croke Park; Attendance: 0 Referee: K Jordan (Tipperary)
