= Ulster Junior Club Hurling Championship =

- Current season or competition: 2026 Ulster Junior Club Hurling Championship
- Irish: Craobh Clubanna Iomána Shóisir Uladh
- Code: Hurling
- Founded: 2004; 22 years ago
- Region: Ulster (GAA)
- No. of teams: 9
- Title holders: Swatragh (1st title)
- Most titles: Castleblayney (4 titles)
- Sponsors: Allied Irish Banks
- Motto: The toughest of them all
- Official website: Ulster GAA

The Ulster Junior Club Hurling Championship (known for sponsorship reasons as the AIB Ulster GAA Hurling Junior Club Championship) is an annual hurling competition organised by the Ulster Council of the Gaelic Athletic Association and contested by third tier clubs in the province of Ulster in Ireland.

The series of games are organised by the Gaelic Athletic Association and are played during the winter months. Teams qualify for this competition by winning the Junior hurling championship in one of the counties of Ulster. The winners represent Ulster in the All-Ireland Junior Club Hurling Championship.

Swatragh are the title holders, defeating Castlewellan by 3–18 to 0–08 in the 2026 final.

== Teams ==
=== Qualification ===
County	Championship	Qualifying team
Antrim	Antrim Junior Hurling Championship	Champions
Armagh	Armagh Junior Hurling Championship	Champions
Cavan	Cavan Senior Hurling Championship	Cootehill Celtic
Derry	Derry Junior Hurling Championship	Champions
Donegal	Donegal Intermediate Hurling Championship	Champions
Down	Down Junior Hurling Championship	Champions
Fermanagh	Fermanagh Reserve Hurling Championship	Champions
Monaghan	Monaghan Senior Hurling Championship	Runners-Up
Tyrone	Tyrone Junior Hurling Championship	Champions

== Roll of Honour ==
=== By club ===
#	Club	County	Titles	Runners-Up	Championships won	Championships runner-Up
1	Castleblayney Hurling Club	MON	4	0	2005, 2014, 2018, 2023	—
2	Setanta	DON	2	2	2017, 2022	2007, 2008
2	Eoghan Rua, Coleraine	DER	2	0	2015, 2019	—
2	Burt	DON	2	0	2011, 2025	—
5	Shane O'Neill's	ANT	1	1	2004	2022
5	Craobh Rua	ARM	1	1	2021	2013
5	Clooney Gaels	ANT	1	0	2006	—
5	Glen Rovers, Armoy	ANT	1	0	2007	—
5	Lisbellaw St Patrick's	FER	1	0	2008	—
5	Naomh Colum Cille	TYR	1	0	2009	—
5	Inniskeen	MON	1	0	2010	—
5	Bredagh	DOW	1	0	2012	—
5	Creggan Kickhams	ANT	1	0	2013	—
5	Lámh Dhearg	ANT	1	0	2016	—
5	Ballinascreen	DER	1	0	2024	—
5	Swatragh	DER	1	0	2026	—
17	Na Magha	DER	0	3	—	2012, 2014, 2017
17	Strabane Shamrocks	TYR	0	2	—	2005, 2006
17	St Malachy's, Portadown	ARM	0	1	—	2004
17	St Mary's Rasharkin	ANT	0	1	—	2009
17	St Brigid's, Cloughmills	ANT	0	1	—	2010
17	Creggan Kickhams	ANT	0	1	—	2011
17	Ballela	DOW	0	1	—	2015
17	Sean MacCumhaills	DON	0	1	—	2016
17	Robert Emmets	ANT	0	1	—	2018
17	Newry Shamrocks	DOW	0	1	—	2019
17	Carrickmacross	MON	0	1	—	2021
17	St Eunan's	DON	0	1	—	2023
17	East Cavan Gaels	CAV	0	1	—	2024
17	Lavey	DER	0	1	—	2025
17	Castlewellan	DOW	0	1	—	2026

=== By county ===
#	County	Titles	Runners-Up	Total	Most Recent Win
1	Antrim	5	5	10	2016
1	Monaghan	5	1	6	2023
3	Donegal	4	4	8	2025
3	Derry	4	4	8	2026
5	Down	1	3	4	2012
5	Tyrone	1	2	3	2009
5	Armagh	1	2	3	2021
5	Fermanagh	1	0	1	2008
9	Cavan	0	1	1	2024

== List of Finals ==
=== List of Ulster JHC finals ===
Year	Winners			Runners-up		
Year	County	Club	Score	County	Club	Score
2026	DER	Swatragh	3-18	DOW	Castlewellan	0-08
2025	DON	Burt	0–20	DER	Lavey	1–16
2024	DER	Ballinascreen	1–25	CAV	East Cavan Gaels	3–09
2023	MON	Castleblayney Hurling Club	2–16	DON	St Eunan's	1–15
2022	DON	Setanta	1–22	ANT	Shane O'Neill's	0–15
2021	ARM	Craobh Rua	1–15	MON	Carrickmacross	1–10
2020	Cancelled due to the impact of the COVID-19 pandemic on Gaelic games					
2019	DER	Eoghan Rua	1–16	DOW	Newry Shamrocks	0–11
2018	MON	Castleblayney Hurling Club	1–14	ANT	Robert Emmets	0–16
2017	DON	Setanta	2–17	DER	Na Magha	3–11
2016	ANT	Lámh Dhearg	0–16	DON	Sean MacCumhaills	0–13
2015	DER	Eoghan Rua	3–15	DOW	Ballela	0–07
2014	MON	Castleblayney Hurling Club	4–13	DER	Na Magha	1–07
2013	ANT	Creggan Kickhams	0–13	ARM	Craobh Rua	1–07
2012	DOW	Bredagh	4–18	DER	Na Magha	3–07
2011	DON	Burt	2–10	ANT	Creggan Kickhams	0–13
2010	MON	Inniskeen	0–14	ANT	St Brigid's	1–09
2009	TYR	Naomh Colum Cille	4–10	ANT	St Mary's Rasharkin	2–14
2008	FER	Lisbellaw St Patrick's	5–14	DON	Setanta	1–12
2007	ANT	Glen Rovers	1–09	DON	Setanta	0–11
2006	ANT	Clooney Gaels		TYR	Strabane Shamrocks	
2005	MON	Castleblayney Hurling Club		TYR	Strabane Shamrocks	
2004	ANT	Shane O'Neill's		ARM	St Malachy's	

== See also ==
- All-Ireland Junior Club Hurling Championship
  - Munster Junior Club Hurling Championship
  - Leinster Junior Club Hurling Championship
  - Connacht Junior Club Hurling Championship
- Ulster Senior Club Hurling Championship (Tier 1)
- Ulster Intermediate Club Hurling Championship (Tier 2)
