= 2013 Nicky Rackard Cup =

- Dates: 4 May – 8 June 2013
- Teams: 6
- Champions: Donegal (1st title); Ray Durack (manager)
- Runners-up: Roscommon

Tournament statistics
- Matches played: 9

The 2013 season was the ninth staging of the Nicky Rackard Cup. Donegal were the 2013 Champions, defeating Roscommon in the final. However, they were not promoted to the 2014 Christy Ring Cup due to a restructuring of the competition.

== Format ==
Six teams compete. Four play in Round 1, two go straight to Round 2.

- The Round 1 winners advance to Round 2. The Round 1 losers go into quarter-finals.
- The Round 2 winners advance to semi-finals. The Round 2 losers go into quarter-finals.
- The quarter-final winners advance to semi-finals.

== Team changes ==
=== To Championship ===
Relegated from the Christy Ring Cup

- None

Promoted from the Lory Meagher Cup

- Tyrone

=== From Championship ===
Promoted to the Christy Ring Cup

- Armagh

Relegated to the Lory Meagher Cup

- None

== Teams ==
- Donegal
- Louth
- Monaghan
- Roscommon
- Sligo
- Tyrone

== Results ==
=== Round 1 ===
4 May 2013 Round 1	Tyrone	1-11 - 0-12	Louth	Carrickmore
15:00

4 May 2013 Round 1	Roscommon	1-18 - 0-14	Sligo	Athleague
15:00

=== Round 2 ===
11 May 2013 Round 2	Tyrone	2-19 - 1-10	Monaghan	Killyclogher
15:00

11 May 2013 Round 2	Roscommon	0-16 - 1-16	Donegal	Athleague
15:00

=== Quarter-finals ===
18 May 2013 Quarter-final	Monaghan	5-12 - 2-7	Sligo	Inniskeen
15:00

18 May 2013 Quarter-final	Roscommon	2-14 - 0-13	Louth	Connacht Centre of Excellence
16:00

=== Semi-finals ===
25 May 2013 Semi-final	Donegal	5-12 - 2-9	Monaghan	Letterkenny
15:00

25 May 2013 Semi-final	Roscommon	3-28 - 0-14	Tyrone	Athleague
15:00

=== Final ===
8 June 2013 Final	Donegal	3-20 - 3-16	Roscommon	Croke Park
		Report		Referee: P Murphy (Carlow)

== Miscellaneous ==
- Doengal won their 1st championship in 2 years, last winning the 2011 Lory Meagher Cup.

== See also ==
- 2013 All-Ireland Senior Hurling Championship
- 2013 Ulster Senior Hurling Championship
- 2013 Christy Ring Cup
- 2013 Lory Meagher Cup
