= O'Donnell Park =

GAA stadium in County Donegal, Ireland

- Páirc Uí Dhomhnaill
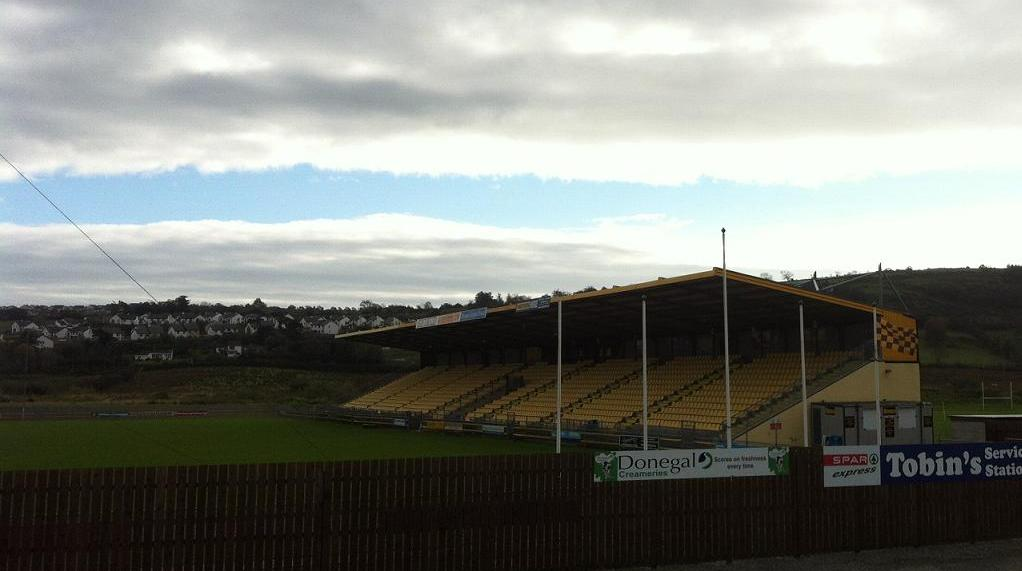

- Location within island of Ireland
- Location: Letterkenny, County Donegal, Ireland
- Coordinates: 54°56′44″N 7°45′09″W
- Owner: St Eunan's
- Capacity: 8,200 (2012–present) (2,500 Seated)
- Surface: Grass
- Field size: 145 m × 89 m (159 yd × 97 yd)
- Public transit: Letterkenny bus station

Construction
- Opened: 1937
- Renovated: 1955

O'Donnell Park (Irish: Páirc Uí Dhomhnaill) is a GAA stadium in County Donegal, Ireland. The home ground of the St Eunan's club, it is situated between the Letterkenny Regional Sports and Leisure Complex and Ballymacool Park on the outskirts of the town. The Donegal county football team uses O'Donnell Park as a venue for matches (as does the county hurling team).

== History ==
The ground has hosted Gaelic games since the 1930s when the St Eunan's club bought the land for £300. The ground opened on Sunday 2 May 1937, with the Bishop of Raphoe's blessing of the park, a hurling match between Donegal and Antrim, an address from GAA President Bob O'Keeffe and a football match between Donegal and Armagh. The grounds was named for Cardinal Patrick O'Donnell (1856–1927), a Donegal man who was educated in Letterkenny and later became Catholic Archbishop of Armagh.

During the Fleadh Cheoil na hÉireann 2006, the ground was used as a makeshift campsite for visitors to the town for the duration of the festival. On 11 November 2008, St Eunan's confirmed that it had completed the purchase of 14.5 acres (59,000 m^{2}) of land adjoining O'Donnell Park, which it intended to develop over the coming years into additional pitches for the club.

The Sam Maguire Cup and members of Donegal's 2012 All-Ireland SFC winning team attended a world record attempt at O'Donnell Park on 29 September 2012.

The O'Donnell Park pitch was "highly commended" at the 2019 National Pitch Awards, and finished in the top six alongside such stadiums as Páirc Tailteann, Nowlan Park, Pearse Stadium and Dr Hyde Park.

During the COVID-19 pandemic, O'Donnell Park was used as a drive-through test centre.

== County matches ==
Having formerly been a venue for football matches played by the Donegal county team, O'Donnell Park went unused for this purpose for three decades. On 25 March 2007, O'Donnell Park hosted its first inter-county football match since this hiatus, with Donegal defeating reigning All-Ireland champions Kerry by a scoreline of 1–15 to 0–13 in Division 1 (the top tier) of the National Football League. There was a half-hour delay to the game after the Kerry team were unable to arrive on time due to fog at the airport. TG4 broadcast the match live to a national audience. Donegal followed up their victory by winning the 2007 National Football League title.

Donegal have played the following league games at O'Donnell Park since then.

Date	Opponent	Round
25 March 2007	Kerry	Regular
13 April 2008	Derry	Division 1 semi-final
2009	Mayo	Regular
2011	Kildare	Regular
2012	Laois	Regular
2014	Monaghan	Matchday three
8 March 2015	Monaghan	Regular
13 March 2016	Roscommon	Regular
5 February 2017	Kerry	Regular
4 February 2018	Galway	Regular
24 February 2019	Fermanagh	Regular
9 February 2020	Galway	Regular
27 March 2022	Armagh	Regular
26 February 2023	Galway	Regular

NFL matches at the venue have tended to be competitive, with opponents finding it difficult to leave with full points if they do. 2014's 2–11 to 0–10 victory over Monaghan, an eight-point win, is Donegal's biggest victory at O'Donnell Park.

It has also been used by the Donegal senior hurling team, for example in the 2020 Nicky Rackard Cup.

== See also ==
- List of Gaelic Athletic Association stadiums
- List of stadiums in Ireland by capacity
