= Donegal Senior Hurling Championship =

Annual hurling competition

- Irish: Craobh Iománaíocht Sinsear Co. Dhún na nGall
- Code: Hurling
- Founded: 1924
- Region: Donegal (GAA)
- No. of teams: 8
- Title holders: St Eunan's (3rd title)
- Most titles: Burt (40 titles)
- Sponsors: None

The Donegal Senior Hurling Championship is an annual hurling competition contested by top-tier Donegal GAA clubs. The County Final is usually played at O'Donnell Park in Letterkenny.

St Eunan's are the reigning champion by defeating Setanta by 1-18 to 1-17.

== Teams ==
=== 2026 Teams ===
The 6 teams competing in the 2026 season were:

Team	Location	Colours	Position in 2026	Titles won	Most recent title
Buncrana	Buncrana	Green, white and gold	Group stage	0	—N/a
Burt	Burt	Primrose and blue	Semi-final	40	2024
Carndonagh	Carndonagh	Red and green	Group stage	3	1959
Seán MacCumhaills	Ballybofey and Stranorlar	Green and white	Semi-final	2	2016
Setanta	Killygordon	Green and black	Runners-up	19	2025
St Eunan's	Letterkenny	Amber and black	Champions	3	2026

=== 2026 grades ===
Championship	Team
Senior
Senior	Buncrana
Senior	Burt
Senior	Carndonagh
Senior	Seán MacCumhaills
Senior	Setanta
Senior	St Eunan's
Intermediate / Junior
Intermediate	An Clochán Liath
Intermediate	Aodh Ruadh
Intermediate	Burt (2nd team)
Intermediate	Four Masters
Intermediate	Letterkenny Gaels
Intermediate	St Eunan's (2nd team)

== History ==
Burt hold the most SHC titles of any club in the country (40), having passed out Waterford Senior Hurling Championship club Mount Sion's total of 35 with the 36th title win of 2013.

== Format ==
=== Group stage ===
The six teams play each team once, resulting in each team being guaranteed at least five games. Two points are awarded for a win, one for a draw and zero for a loss. The teams are ranked in the group stage table by points gained, then scoring difference and then their head-to-head record. The top four teams qualify for the knockout stage.

There is currently no direct relegation to the Donegal Intermediate Hurling Championship.

=== Knockout stage ===
Semi-finals: The top four teams from the group stage contest this round. The winning teams from these two games advance to the final.

Final: The two semi-final winners contest the final. The winning team are declared champions.

== Trophy ==
The trophy presented to the winners is the Munster Cup.

== Qualification for subsequent competitions ==
The Donegal SHC winner qualifies for the Ulster Senior Club Hurling Championship.

== Winners and finalists ==
=== Results by team ===
Results by team
#	Team	Title wins	Runners-up	Years won	Years runner-up
1	Burt	40	14	1952, 1955, 1956, 1957, 1961, 1962, 1965, 1967, 1968, 1969, 1970, 1971, 1976, 1979, 1982, 1989, 1991, 1992, 1993, 1994, 1995, 1996, 1997, 1998, 1999, 2000, 2001, 2002, 2003, 2004, 2005, 2006, 2009, 2011, 2012, 2013, 2014, 2015, 2018, 2024	1947, 1972, 1973, 1975, 1980, 1981, 1983, 1986, 1987, 1990, 2007, 2008, 2016, 2022
2	Setanta	19	16	1973, 1974, 1980, 1981, 1983, 1984, 1985, 1986, 1987, 1988, 1990, 2007, 2008, 2017, 2019, 2020, 2022, 2023, 2025	1979, 1982, 1993, 1999, 2000, 2003, 2004, 2005, 2006, 2010, 2011, 2013, 2018, 2021, 2024, 2026
3	Letterkenny	6	1	1926, 1932, 1933, 1938, 1945, 1953	1924
4	Aodh Ruadh	5	4	1924, 1925, 1929, 1975, 1977	1943, 1971, 1976, 1989
5	Carrowmore	4	0	1934, 1935, 1936, 1937	—N/a
6	St Eunan's	3	6	1972, 2021, 2026	2002, 2017, 2019, 2020, 2023, 2025
6	Carndonagh	3	4	1944, 1954, 1959	1974, 1984, 1985, 1988
8	Seán MacCumhaills	2	5	2010, 2016	1998, 2009, 2012, 2014, 2015
8	Erin's Hope	2	0	1943, 1947	—N/a
8	Lifford	2	0	1958, 1960	—N/a
8	Erne Valley	2	0	1964, 1966	—N/a
12	Finner Camp	1	0	1927	—N/a
12	Glenswilly	1	0	1963	—N/a
14	Naomh Mura	0	6	—N/a	1991, 1992, 1994, 1995, 1996, 1997
14	Na Cealla Beaga	0	1	—N/a	1970
14	Roger Casement's	0	1	—N/a	1977
14	Four Masters	0	1	—N/a	2001

==== Notes ====
- Runners-up unknown: 1925–1927, 1929, 1932–1938, 1943–1945, 1947, 1952–1969

=== Finals listed by year ===
==== Legend ====
- Gold – Ulster intermediate club champions
- Silver – Ulster intermediate club runners-up

==== Donegal SHC finals ====
(r) = replay

(aet) = after extra time

Year	Winner		Opponent		Winning captain	Notes
Year	Team	Score	Team	Score	Winning captain	Notes
1924	Aodh Ruadh	5-8	Letterkenny	0-1		
1925	Aodh Ruadh					
1926	Letterkenny					
1927	Finner Camp					
1928						
1929	Aodh Ruadh					
1930						
1931						
1932	Letterkenny					
1933	Letterkenny					
1934	Carrowmore					
1935	Carrowmore					
1936	Carrowmore					
1937	Carrowmore					
1938	Letterkenny					
1939						
1940						
1941						
1942						
1943	Erin's Hope (Ballybofey and Stranorlar)		Aodh Ruadh			
1944	Carndonagh					
1945	Letterkenny					
1946						
1947	Erin's Hope (Ballybofey and Stranorlar)		Burt			
1948						
1949						
1950						
1951						
1952	Burt					
1953	Letterkenny					
1954	Carndonagh					
1955	Burt					
1956	Burt					
1957	Burt					
1958	Lifford					
1959	Carndonagh					
1960	Lifford					
1961	Burt					
1962	Burt					
1963	Glenswilly					
1964	Erne Valley (Gleann-Eirne)					
1965	Burt					
1966	Erne Valley (Gleann-Eirne)					
1967	Burt					
1968	Burt					
1969	Burt					
1970	Burt	3-12	Na Cealla Beaga	1-3		
1971	Burt	9-11	Aodh Ruadh	3-2		
1972	St Eunan's	3-3	Burt	2-1		
1973	Setanta		Burt			
1974	Setanta		Carndonagh			
1975	Aodh Ruadh	4-3	Burt	2-4		
1976	Burt	3-7	Aodh Ruadh	2-6		
1977	Aodh Ruadh	6-8	Roger Casement's	1-1		
1978	Robert Emmet's & Burt			1-8; 2-5		The 1978 final ended in a draw. It was never replayed.
1979	Burt	3-9	Setanta	1-5		
1980	Setanta	2-8	Burt	0-8		
1981	Setanta	2-7	Burt	1-3		
1982	Burt	1-8	Setanta	1-6		
1983	Setanta	2-14	Burt	2-8		
1984	Setanta	3-14	Carndonagh	1-5		
1985	Setanta	3-7	Carndonagh	4-3		
1986	Setanta	2-2	Burt	1-4		
1987	Setanta	5-8	Burt	2-9		
1988	Setanta		Carndonagh			
1989	Burt	4-6	Aodh Ruadh	1-11		
1990	Setanta	3-8	Burt	0-16		
1991	Burt	2-12	Naomh Mura	1-9		
1992	Burt	2-12	Naomh Mura	2-8	Liam Burns	
1993	Burt	2-11	Setanta	3-7	Andy Wallace (C) 8 pts	
1994	Burt	4-7	Naomh Mura	1-4		
1995	Burt	0-16	Naomh Mura	2-5		
1996	Burt	1-16	Naomh Mura	1-6	Andrew Wallace (C) 11 pts	Played in Burt
1997	Burt	3-17	Naomh Mura	3-9		
1998	Burt	3-13	Seán MacCumhaills	0-3	Ciaran Dowds	
1999	Burt	1-12	Setanta	1-8	Fergal Grant	
2000	Burt	5-17	Setanta	0-6		
2001	Burt	5-19	Four Masters	1-3		
2002	Burt	3-21	St Eunan's	2-9		
2003	Burt	4-11	Setanta	2-14		
2004	Burt	Burt W/O Setanta disqualified	Setanta			
2005	Burt	3-8	Setanta	0-11		
2006	Burt	0-17	Setanta	0-15	Andy Wallace (C)13 pts	16 in a row
2007	Setanta	3-8	Burt	0-7		
2008	Setanta	4-7	Burt	1-7		
2009	Burt	3-13	Seán MacCumhaills	2-12		
2010	Seán MacCumhaills	0-15	Setanta	0-12		
2011	Burt	3-11	Setanta	2-7		
2012	Burt	3-14	Seán MacCumhaills	1-12		
2013	Burt	3-13	Setanta	2-14		
2014	Burt	6-9	Seán MacCumhaills	1-9		Ardal McDermott was in charge of the winning team.
2015	Burt	2-7	Seán MacCumhaills	0-12		
2016	Seán MacCumhaills	2-13	Burt	2-9	Lee Henderson	This result ended Burt's attempt at a six-in-a-row.
2017	Setanta	1-16	St Eunan's	1-8		
2018	Burt	3-14	Setanta	1-14	Stephen Gillespie	
2019	Setanta	3-13	St Eunan's	0-13		
2020	Setanta	2-19	St Eunan's	2-13		
2021	St Eunan's	2-9	Setanta	0-14	Conor O'Grady	
2022	Setanta	1-20	Burt	0-18		Liam McKinney was man of the match.
2023	Setanta	4-13	St Eunan's	0-14	Mark Callaghan	
2024	Burt	3-16	Setanta	1-18	Liam McKinney	
2025	Setanta	2-12	St Eunan's	0-13		
2026	St Eunan's	1-18 (a.e.t)	Setanta	1-17		

== See also ==
- Donegal Intermediate Hurling Championship (Tier 2)
- Donegal Junior Hurling Championship (Tier 3)
- Donegal Senior Football Championship
- Ulster Intermediate Club Hurling Championship
