= 2011 Lory Meagher Cup =

Hurling competition

- Dates: 23 April – 4 June 2011
- Teams: 8
- Champions: Donegal; Colm Breathnach (captain); Andrew Wallace (manager)
- Runners-up: Tyrone; Tom Magill (manager)

Tournament statistics
- Matches played: 11
- Goals scored: 42 (3.82 per match)
- Points scored: 265 (24.09 per match)

The 2011 Lory Meagher Cup is the third edition of the Lory Meagher Cup since its establishment by the Gaelic Athletic Association in 2009 and is the fourth-tier of Hurling for senior county teams (the All-Ireland Senior Hurling Championship is the first-tier trophy). It is contested by eight GAA county teams ranked 29–36 in the 2011 All-Ireland Senior Hurling Championship.

The winners of the 2011 Lory Meagher Cup, Donegal were promoted to the 2012 Nicky Rackard Cup.

== Format ==
The tournament had a double elimination format - each team played at least two games before being knocked out.

- The eight teams played four Round 1 matches.
  - The winners in Round 1 advanced to Round 2A.
  - The losers in Round 1 went into Round 2B.
- There were two Round 2A matches.
  - The winners in Round 2A advanced to the semifinals.
  - The losers in Round 2A went into the quarter-finals.
- There were two Round 2B matches.
  - The winners in Round 2B advanced to the quarter-finals.
  - The losers in Round 2B were eliminated.
- There were two quarter-final matches between the Round 2A losers and Round 2B winners.
  - The winners of the quarter-finals advanced to the semifinals.
  - The losers of the quarter-finals were eliminated.
- There were two semifinal matches between the Round 2A winners and the quarter-final winners.
  - The winners of the semifinals advanced to the final.
  - The losers of the semifinals were eliminated.
- The winners of the final won the Lory Meagher Cup for 2011.

== Team changes ==
=== To Championship ===
Relegated from the Nicky Rackard Cup

- Tyrone

=== From Championship ===
Promoted to the Nicky Rackard Cup

- None

== Teams ==
County	Last Cup Title	Last Provincial Title	Last All-Ireland Title	Position in 2010 Championship	Appearance
Cavan	—	—	—	Quarter-finals	3rd
Donegal	—	1932	—	Runners-up	3rd
Fermanagh	—	—	—	Semi-finals	3rd
Leitrim	—	—	—	Semi-finals	3rd
Longford	2010	—	—	Champions	3rd
South Down	—	—	—	Round 2	3rd
Tyrone	2009	—	—	Round 2 (Nicky Rackard Cup)	2nd
Warwickshire	—	—	—	Quarter-finals	3rd

== Bracket ==
Round 1 Round 2B
Donegal	3-16
Warwickshire	1-13
Fermanagh	w/o
Cavan	scr.
Leitrim	2-11
Warwickshire	4-11
Longford	2-12
Tyrone	4-17
South Down	4-25
Leitrim	0-8

Round 2A; Quarter-finals
Donegal	3-18
Fermanagh	2-8
Longford	1-14
South Down	2-14
Warwickshire	4-8
Fermanagh	1-10
Tyrone	2-14
South Down	1-9

Semi-finals
Donegal	1-15
South Down	1-12
Warwickshire	2-10
Tyrone	2-15

Final
Donegal	2-12
Tyrone	0-17

== Round 1 ==
23 April 2011

Warwickshire	1-13 - 3-16	Donegal
K Codd 1-7, J Bergin, D Kelly 0-2 each, S Carey, K Boxwell 0-1 each	Report	E McDermott 2-3, N Campell 0-8, E Organ 1-2, J Donnelly, P Sheridan, S Boyle 0-1 each

Páirc na hÉireann, Birmingham
Referee: D Hughes (Carlow)

23 April 2011

Longford	2-12 - 4-17	Tyrone
E Donnellan 0-6 (4f), J Newman 1-2, J Minnock 1-0, Joe O'Brien 0-2, M Morrissey, J Casey 0-1 each.	Report	C Grogan 2-1, P O'Connor 2-0, A Kelly 0-5 (2f), C McErlean 0-5 (1f), R O'Neill 0-3, M O'Gorman, T Hughes, M Winters 0-1 each

Pearse Park, Longford
Referee: C Groome (Offaly)

23 April 2011

South Down	4-25 - 0-08	Leitrim
M Magee 2-1, E McGuinness 1-4, P McAleenan 0-5, M Cunningham 1-3, L Morgan 0-4, E Trainor 0-3, J Brown, P O'Neill 0-2 each, K Fegan 0-1	Report	M Lane 0-6, G Hickey, S Guckian 0-1 each.

Liatroim
Referee: O Elliott (Antrim)

23 April 2011

Fermanagh	Fermanagh win in a walkover	Cavan

== Round 2 ==
=== Round 2A ===
30 April 2011

Donegal	3-18 - 2-08	Fermanagh
E McDermott 2-2, M McCann 1-5, N Campbell 0-7 (1f, 1 '65'), L Henderson 0-2, S Bole, S McVeigh 0-1 each	Report	R Bogue 1-3 (1-0pen, 3f), S Corrigan 1-2, D McGarry 0-2, S Curran 0-1f.

Letterkenny
Referee: E Hassan (Derry)

30 April 2011

Tyrone	2-14 - 1-09	South Down
C McErlean 1-3 (0-1f), C Grogan 1-1 (1-0 pen), A Kelly 0-4 (1f, 2 '65'), M O'Gorman, P O'Connor 0-2 each, Rory O'Neill, Ryan O'Neill 0-1 each.	Report	E McGuinness 1-0, L Morgan 0-5 (2f), P O'Neill 0-3 (1 '65'), J O'Kane 0-1.

Omagh
Referee: D Hughes (Carlow)

=== Round 2B ===
30 April 2011

Leitrim	2-11 - 4-11	Warwickshire
M Lane 2-9 (4f), S Moran, M Quinn 0-1 each.	Report	S O'Hanlon 1-2, J Bergin 1-1, R McEntee, M O'Hara 1-0 each, C Boxwell, J Dwyer, D Kelly (1f) 0-2 each, C Maskey, P McHugh 0-1 each

Páirc Sheáin Mhic Dhiarmada, Carrick on Shannon
Referee: M O'Connor (Limerick)

== Quarter-finals ==
7 May 2011

Longford	1-14 - 2-14	South Down
E Donnellan 0-8, P Cullen 1-0, S Hannon 0-3, R, Donnellan, J Minnock, K Murray 0-1 each	Report	L Morgan 0-10 (7f), E McGuinness 2-0, M Mageer 0-3, E Donnelly 0-1

Liatroim
Referee: R Matthews (Antrim)

7 May 2011

Fermanagh	1-10 - 4-08	Warwickshire
R Bogue 1-2 (1-0 pen, 1f), JP McGarry 0-2, A Breslin, S Curran, P Timoney, K Kehoe, S Corrigan, D McGarry 0-1 each.	Report	D Kelly 2-1 (1-0 pen), R McEntee 1-1, J O'Dwyer 1-0, S Carey 0-3, S O'Hanlon 0-2 (1f), M O'Hara 0-1

Brewster Park, Enniskillen
Referee: C Brown (Galway)

== Semi-finals ==
21 May 2011

Tyrone	2-15 - 2-10	Warwickshire
A Kelly 0-7 (5f), R O'Neill 2-0, C Grogan 0-4, G Fox, M Winters, J Kelly, M O'Gorman 0-1 each	Report	D Kelly 0-6 (4f), K Codd 0-4 (1f), K Boxwell, C Maskey 1-0 each

Páirc na hÉireann
Referee: J O'Connell

21 May 2011

Donegal	1-15 - 1-12 A.E.T.	South Down
N Campbell 0-11 (9f), E McDermott 1-1, S Boyle, L Henderson, R McDermott 0-1 each	Report	L Morgan 0-6 (3f, 1 '65'), K Courtney 1-0, J O'Kane 0-3, P McAleenan, E Trainor, E McGuinness 0-1 each

Páirc Esler, Newry
Referee: S Cleere (Kilkenny)

== Final ==
4 June 2011

Tyrone	0-17 – 2-12	Donegal
Justin Kelly 0-5 (4f); Aidan Kelly (2f), Conor Grogan 0-3 each; Gary Fox, Rory O'Neill 0-2 each; Mike O’Gorman, Peter O'Connor 0-1	Report	Ciaran Matthewson 2-3; Niall Campbell 0-6 (4f, 1 '65'); Sean McVeigh, Paul Sheridan, Mickey McCann 0-1 each

Croke Park, Dublin
Referee: F Smith

== Statistics ==
=== Top scorers ===
==== Overall ====
Rank	Player	County	Tally	Total	Matches	Average
1	Niall Campbell	Donegal	0-32	32	4	8.00
2	Liam Morgan	South Down	0-25	25	4	6.25
3	Enda McDermott	Donegal	5-6	21	4	5.25
3	Michael Lane	Leitrim	2-15	21	2	10.50
5	Aidan Kelly	Tyrone	0-19	19	4	4.75

==== Single game ====
Rank	Player	County	Tally	Total	Opposition
1	Michael Lane	Leitrim	2-9	15	Warwickshire
2	Niall Campbell	Donegal	0-11	11	South Down
3	Kevin Codd	Warwickshire	1-7	10	Donegal
3	Liam Morgan	South Down	0-10	10	Longford
5	Enda McDermott	Donegal	2-3	9	Warwickshire
5	Ciaran Matthewson	Donegal	2-3	9	Tyrone
7	Enda McDermott	Donegal	2-2	8	Fermanagh
7	Mickey McCann	Donegal	1-5	8	Fermanagh
7	Niall Campbell	Donegal	0-8	8	Warwickshire
7	Eoin Donnellan	Longford	0-8	8	South Down

=== Scoring events ===
- Widest winning margin: 29 points
  - South Down 4-25 - 0-08 Leitrim (Round 1)
- Most goals in a match: 6
  - Longford 2-12 - 4-17 Tyrone (Round 1)
  - Leitrim 2-11 - 4-11 Warwickshire (Round 2B)
- Most points in a match: 33
  - South Down 4-25 - 0-08 Leitrim (Round 1)
- Most goals by one team in a match: 4
  - South Down 4-25 - 0-08 Leitrim (Round 1)
  - Tyrone 4-17 - 2-12 Longford (Round 1)
  - Warwickshire 4-11 - 2-11 Leitrim (Round 2B)
  - Warwickshire 4-08 - 1-10 Fermanagh (Quarter-final)
- Most goals scored by a losing team: 2
  - Longford 2-12 - 4-17 Tyrone (Round 1)
  - Leitrim 2-11 - 4-11 Warwickshire (Round 2B)
  - Fermanagh 2-08 - 3-18 Donegal (Round 2A)
- Most points scored by a losing team: 14
  - Longford 1-14 - 2-14 South Down (Quarter-final)
- Most points by one team in a match: 25
  - South Down 4-25 - 0-08 Leitrim (Round 1)
- Highest aggregate score: 47 points
  - Longford 2-12 - 4-17 Tyrone (Round 1)
- Lowest aggregate score: 32 points
  - Tyrone 2-14 - 1-09 South Down (Round 2)

== Miscellaneous ==
- Donegal win their 1st championship in 8 years, last winning the 2003 Ulster Junior Hurling Championship

== See also ==
- 2011 All-Ireland Senior Hurling Championship
- 2011 Ulster Senior Hurling Championship
- 2011 Christy Ring Cup
- 2011 Nicky Rackard Cup
