= 2018 Nicky Rackard Cup =

- Dates: 12 May 2018 – 23 June 2018
- Teams: 9
- Champions: Donegal (2nd title); Mickey McCann (manager)

Tournament statistics
- Matches played: 6
- Top scorer(s): Joe O'Brien (2-24)

The 2018 Nicky Rackard Cup was the 14th staging of the Nicky Rackard Cup hurling championship since its establishment by the Gaelic Athletic Association in 2005. It was the fourth tier of senior inter-county hurling as of 2018.

The competition began on Saturday 12 May 2018 and ended on Saturday 23 June 2018.

Derry were the 2017 champions, beating Armagh in the final. Both teams were promoted to the 2018 Christy Ring Cup as a result of the restructuring of the All-Ireland Senior Hurling Championship. Following the withdrawal of the Fingal team from the competition in 2017, there was no relegation from the 2017 competition and Warwickshire were promoted from the 2017 Lory Meagher Cup.

== Format ==
Beginning in 2018, the Nicky Rackard Cup changed to an initial stage of two groups, which in 2018 consisted of one group of four teams and one group of three teams. Previously it was a double elimination tournament.

The top two teams from both groups advance to the knockout semi-finals. The winners of the 2018 Nicky Rackard Cup are promoted to the 2019 Christy Ring Cup. Two teams will be relegated from the 2018 Christy Ring Cup to the 2019 Nicky Rackard Cup to make the 2019 completion into two groups of four teams.

The bottom teams from each group playoff in a relegation match with the losers playing in the 2019 Lory Meagher Cup. They are replaced by the winners of the 2018 Lory Meagher Cup.

== Group stage ==
=== Group 1 ===
==== Table ====
Pos	Team	Pld	W	D	L	SF	SA	Diff	Pts	Qualification
1	Warwickshire	3	3	0	0	68	52	+16	6	Advance to knockout stage
2	Monaghan	3	1	1	1	69	58	+11	3	Advance to knockout stage
3	Longford	3	1	0	2	48	59	-11	2	
4	Louth	3	0	1	2	49	65	-16	1	Advance to relegation playoff

==== Matches ====
===== Group 1 Round 1 =====
12 May 2018 Round 1	Monaghan	4-19 – 2-11	Longford	Grattan Park, Inniskeen
	E Collins 1-7, M Treanor 1-3, F Rafter 0-5 (2fs) T Campbell, B McGuigan 1-0, C Boye 0-2, A Kenny, C McNally 0-1 each.	Report	J O'Brien 2-3, C Mullane 0-4 (3fs), P Walsh 0-2, C Kavanagh 0-1.	Referee: A Ferguson (Fermanagh)

12 May 2018 Round 1	Louth	1-16 – 3-19	Warwickshire	Dundalk
	P Lynch 0-6 (4 fs), D Kettle 1-1, R Byrne (2fs), S Callan, S Connelly 0-2 each, J Crosbie, G Smyth, D Ryan 0-1 each.	Report	N McKenna (5fs), D Nugent 0-5 each, P Hoban 0-4 (3fs), S Caulfield 1-1, G Lennon, K Magee 1-0 each, P Uniacke 0-2, J Collins, N Kennedy 0-1 each.	Referee: J Clarke (Cavan)

===== Group 1 Round 2 =====
19 May 2018 Round 2	Warwickshire	1-21 - 3-11	Monaghan	Páirc na hÉireann, Solihull
	N McKenna 0-9 (5f), G Lennon 1-4, P Hoban 0-2 (1f), D Nugent 0-2, B Fallon 0-2, J Collins and S Caulfield 0-1 each.	Report	F Rafter 0-7 (2f), M Treanor 1-0, E Collins 1-1, T Campbell 1-1, C Boyle 0-3, P Finnegan 0-1.	Referee: K Brady (Louth)

19 May 2018 Round 2	Longford	0-19 - 0-12	Louth	Pearse Park, Longford
	J O'Brien 0-9 (5f), P Walsh 0-5, K Murray 0-2, C Mullane, C Kavanagh, D Connell 0-1 each.	Report	P Lynch 0-4, (3f, 1'65), A McCrave, M Molloy, S Connolly 0-2 each, D Ryan, J Crosbie 0-1 each.	Referee: T Gleeson (Dublin)

===== Group 1 Round 3 =====
2 June 2018 Round 3	Louth	0-18 - 0-18	Monaghan	Dowdallshill
1:00 pm	P Lynch 0-10 (9f); R Byrne 0-3 (3f); G Smyth, D Kettle, S Connelly, S Kettle, M Molloy 0-1 each.	Report	F Rafter 0-10 (9f); M Treanor 0-2; E Collins 0-2; C Boyle, C Flynn, P Finnegan and C Power 0-1 each.	Referee: G McGrath (Wexford)

2 June 2018 Round 3	Longford	0-13 - 1-13	Warwickshire	Glennon Brothers Pearse Park, Longford
1:00 pm	J O'Brien 0-12 (8f, 1 '65), Jody Leonard 0-1.	Report	N McKenna 0-9 (7f, 1 '65'), K Magee 1-0, P Hoban, S Caulfield, C Robbins, B Fallon 0-1 each.	Referee: J Clarke (Cavan)

=== Group 2 ===
==== Table ====
Pos	Team	Pld	W	D	L	SF	SA	Diff	Pts	Qualification
1	Donegal	2	2	0	0	63	29	+34	4	Advance to knockout stage
2	Tyrone	2	1	0	1	46	49	-3	2	Advance to knockout stage
3	Leitrim	2	0	0	2	34	65	-31	0	Advance to relegation playoff

==== Matches ====
===== Group 2 Round 1 =====
12 May 2018 Round 1	Tyrone	1-12 – 1-26	Donegal	Killyclogher
1:00 pm	D Casey 0-7 (4f, 1 '65), B McGurk 1-0, C Kearns 0-2, L Devlin, R McKernan, D Begley 0-1 each.	Report	D Coulter 0-13 (9f), D Flynn 1-5, C Matthewson 0-3, G Gilmore 0-2, R McDermott, J Donnelly, C McDermott 0-1 each.

===== Group 2 Round 2 =====
19 May 2018 Round 2	Donegal	2-28 - 2-08	Leitrim	O'Donnell Park, Letterkenny
1:00 pm	D Flynn (4f, 1 '65) 1-13, G Gilmore 1-4, J Boyle, K Campbell, L Henderson 0-2 each, C Matthewson, D Cullen, E McDermott, B Lafferty, C McDermott 0-1 each.	Report	C Cunniffe (4f) 1-5, B Murray 1-0, C Donovan 0-2, J Clancy 0-1.	Referee: K McGeeney (Roscommon)

===== Group 2 Round 3 =====
2 June 2018 Round 3	Leitrim	2-14 - 2-25	Tyrone	Páirc Seán Mac Diarmada, Carrick
1:00 pm	C Cunniffe 0-6 (5f, '65'); C O'Donovan 0-4; C Moreton & J Glancy 1-0 (each); Z Moradi 0-2; A Duffy, J McNabola 0-1 (each).	Report	P O'Kelly 0-8; D Casey 1-4 (f); A Kelly 1-1; C Kearns, J Ferguson, J Kelly, T Morgan 0-2 each; R McKernan, B McGurk, D Begley, L Armstrong 0-1 each.	Referee: A Ferguson (Fermanagh)

== Knockout stage ==
=== Bracket ===
Semi-Finals
Warwickshire	1-25
Tyrone	1-14
Donegal	4-22
Monaghan	1-10

Final
Warwickshire	0-18
Donegal	2-19

=== Semi-finals ===
The Group 1 winners play the Group 2 runners-up and the Group 2 winners play the Group 1 runners-up.

9 June 2018 Semi-final	Warwickshire	1-25 - 1-14	Tyrone	Dowdallshill
		Report

9 June 2018 Semi-final	Donegal	4-22 - 1-10	Monaghan	Owenbeg
		Report

=== Final ===
The semi-final winners met in the Nicky Rackard Cup final at Croke Park with the winners being promoted to the Christy Ring Cup for 2019.

23 June 2018
Final

Warwickshire	0-18 - 2-19	Donegal
Niall McKenna 0-12 (8fs), Shane Caulfield 0-2, Paul Hoban 0-1 (’65), Niall Kennedy 0-1, Conor Robbins 0-1, Domhnall Nugent 0-1 (1f)	Report	Declan Coulter 1-9 (2fs, 1 ’65), Gerry Gilmore 0-5 (3 sidelines), Gavin Brown 1-0, Davin Flynn 0-2, Bernard Lafferty 0-2, Ciaran Mathewson 0-1.

Croke Park, Dublin
Referee: Gearoid McGrath (Wexford)

== Relegation playoff ==
The bottom teams in each group - the fourth placed team in group 1 and the third placed team in group 2 - meet in a relegation playoff. The winners remain in the Nicky Rackard Cup for 2019, while the losers are relegated to the 2019 Lory Meagher Cup.

9 June 2018
Relegation final

Louth	2-22 - 2-10	Leitrim

- Leitrim are relegated to the 2019 Lory Meagher Cup. Louth will remain in the 2019 Nicky Rackard Cup

== Statistics ==
=== Top scorers ===
==== Overall ====
Rank	Player	County	Tally	Total	Matches	Average
1	Davin Flynn	Donegal	4-31	43	4	10.75
1	Declan Coulter	Donegal	1-28	31	3	10.33
1	Joe O Brien	Longford	2-24	30	3	10.00
3	Niall McKenna	Warwickshire	0-23	23	3	7.66
4	Fergal Rafter	Monaghan	0-22	22	3	7.33
5	Paddy Lynch	Louth	0-20	20	3	6.66
6	Eamon Collins	Monaghan	2-10	16	3	5.33
7	Clement Cunniffe	Leitrim	1-11	14	2	7.00
7	Damian Casey	Tyrone	1-11	14	2	7.00
9	Gerry Gilmore	Donegal	1-11	14	4	3.5

==== Single game ====
Rank	Player	Club	Tally	Total	Opposition
1	Davin Flynn	Donegal	2-11	17	Monaghan
1	Davin Flynn	Donegal	1-13	16	Leitrim
2	Declan Coulter	Donegal	0-13	13	Tyrone
3	Joe O'Brien	Longford	0-12	12	Warwickshire
4	Eamon Collins	Monaghan	1-07	10	Longford
4	Fergal Rafter	Monaghan	0-10	10	Louth
4	Paddy Lynch	Louth	0-10	10	Monaghan
5	Joe O'Brien	Longford	2-03	9	Monaghan
5	Niall McKenna	Warwickshire	0-09	9	Monaghan
5	Joe O'Brien	Longford	0-09	9	Louth
5	Niall McKenna	Warwickshire	0-09	9	Longford

== See also ==
- 2018 All-Ireland Senior Hurling Championship (Tier 1)
- 2018 Leinster Senior Hurling Championship
- 2018 Munster Senior Hurling Championship
- 2018 Joe McDonagh Cup (Tier 2)
- 2018 Christy Ring Cup (Tier 3)
- 2018 Lory Meagher Cup (Tier 5)
