= Donegal GAA =

Gaelic games governing body

- Irish: Dún na nGall; Tír Chonaill
- Founded: 1905
- Province: Ulster
- Dominant sport: Gaelic football
- Ground(s): MacCumhaill Park, Ballybofey
- County colours: Gold Green
- Website: donegalgaa.ie

County teams
- NFL: Division 1
- NHL: Division 2
- Football Championship: Sam Maguire Cup
- Hurling Championship: Nicky Rackard Cup
- Ladies' Gaelic football: Brendan Martin Cup
- Camogie: O'Duffy Cup

The Donegal County Board (Irish: Cumann Lúthchleas Gael Coiste Dhún na nGall) or Donegal GAA is one of 32 county boards of the Gaelic Athletic Association (GAA) in Ireland, and is responsible for the administration of Gaelic games in County Donegal.

The County Board is responsible for preparing the Donegal county teams in the various Gaelic sporting codes; football, hurling, camogie and handball.

The county football team was the third from the province of Ulster to win an All-Ireland Senior Football Championship (SFC), following Cavan and Down. It last won the All-Ireland SFC in 2012 and the Ulster Senior Football Championship in 2024. Donegal players comprised most of the 2012 All Stars Team of the Year, and the three nominations for the All Stars Footballer of the Year, ultimately won by Karl Lacey. In addition, having been invited to assist the Celtic soccer team in Scotland, Donegal manager Jim McGuinness became the first Gaelic football inter-county manager to have been offered a role at a professional sports team abroad. McGuinness's services have also been sought by Premier League soccer teams.

According to a 2015 TUD study by Shane Mangan, Donegal had the largest playing population in Ulster, with 14,000 players at that time.

== Governance ==
The first Donegal County Board was formed in 1905.

Charlie O'Donnell resigned as County Secretary for personal reasons 15 months into a seven-year contract in December 2009.

When John McConnell was County Chairman, he worked with Brian McEniff on plans for a divisional championship in the county; McConnell later resigned and this proposal did not go any further.

Naul McCole was County Chairman in 1992 and was also a selector under Brian McEniff when Donegal won the 1992 All-Ireland Senior Football Championship Final.

Pat Conaghan was County Chairman in 1997.

Brian McEniff was County Chairman in late 2002 when, unable to find a manager for the senior football team, he did it himself.

P. J. McGowan completed five years as County Chairman in December 2012. Sean Dunnion succeeded McGowan. Aodh Ruadh clubman Mick McGrath — a former inter-county referee — succeeded Dunnion as the 43rd chair in 2017.

County Treasurer Cieran Kelly resigned early from his role in July 2018, blaming County Chairman Mick McGrath for ensuring that he "wasn't welcome" at fundraising meetings. The election for Kelly's successor was tied on votes 33 apiece so, at Croke Park's request, lots were drawn to pick Alan Boyd (formerly the Cultural and Irish Officer) over Brendan Kelly.

== Football ==
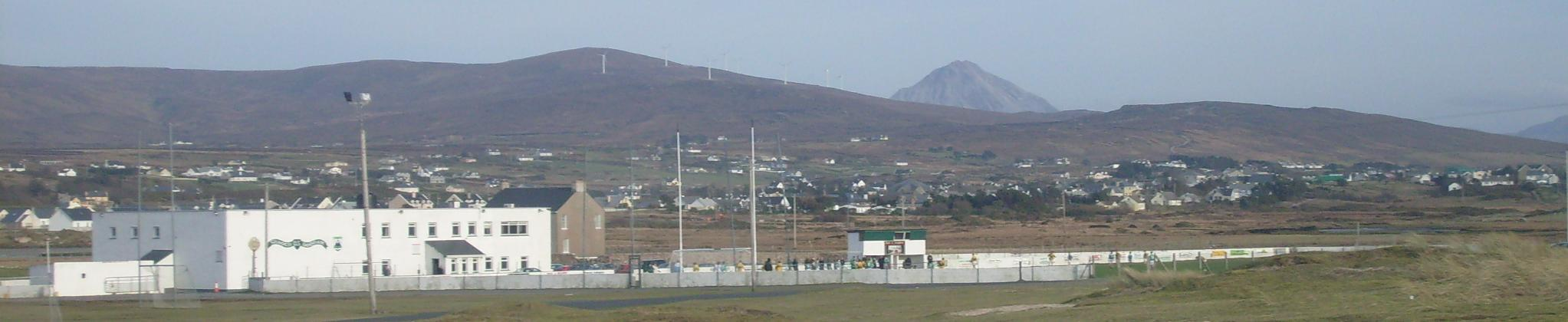
Gaoth Dobhair club grounds in Machaire Gathlán

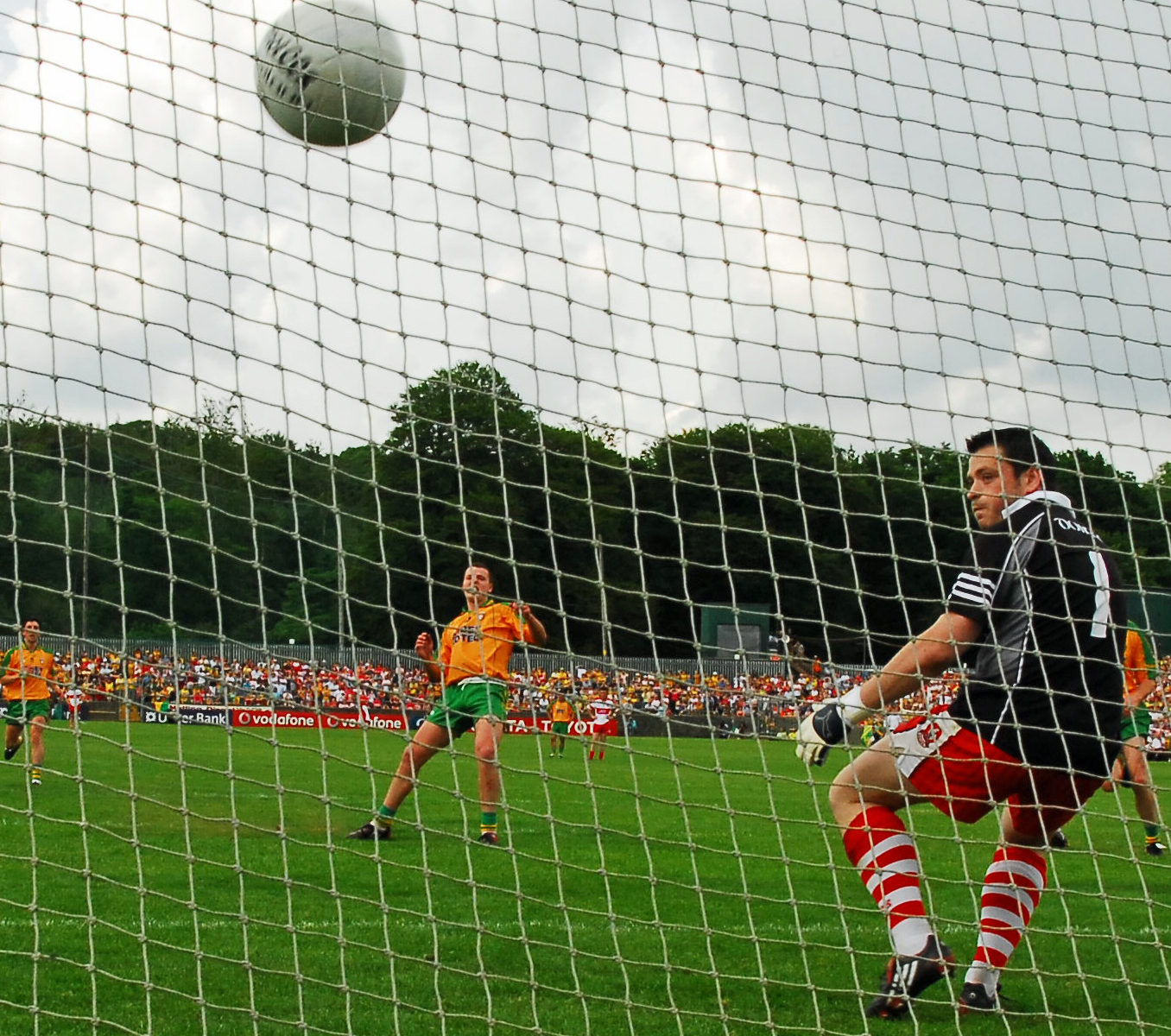
Michael Murphy scores a penalty in the 2008 Ulster Senior Football Championship

=== Clubs ===
The county's most successful football clubs are Gaoth Dobhair and St Eunan's who have won the Donegal Senior Football Championship (SFC) on fifteen occasions each. Gaoth Dobhair also won the Ulster Senior Club Football Championship in 2018.

Aodh Ruadh of Ballyshannon are next in the Donegal SFC rankings, before a sizeable gap to fourth position. 14 clubs have won more than one title. Killybegs, though possessing only six SFCs, also appeared in the final of the 1991 Ulster Senior Club Football Championship, a feat never achieved by either St Eunan's or Aodh Ruadh.

A system of promotion and relegation operates between the SFC and the Donegal Intermediate Football Championship (IFC). Likewise, between the IFC and the Donegal Junior Football Championship (JFC).

The All-County Leagues are another competition for clubs. This had been divided into four divisions for many years but — because of the "split season" and the inability to play 18 rounds of games — from 2022, this was reduced to three, with 13 clubs in Division 1, 14 clubs in Division 2 and 13 clubs in Division 3.

As of 2013, there were 40 clubs under the auspices of the Donegal County Board. These range from Malin at the northernmost point of the county to Naomh Columba in the south, a round distance cited in 2020 media reports of c. 320 kilometres, with an estimated one-way time of more than two hours before roadworks were taken into account.

=== County team ===
The county team came to the fore of Ulster football in the 1970s, winning its first Ulster Senior Football Championship in 1972. The win coincided with the county's first All Star—in the form of Brian McEniff—in the second year of the award's existence. A second provincial title followed for Donegal in 1974.

The county team won a third provincial title in 1983. Fourth and fifth titles followed in 1990 and 1992. They team later qualified for the 1992 All-Ireland Senior Football Championship Final, where it defeated heavy favourites Dublin.

Donegal last won the All-Ireland Senior Football Championship in 2012. The team last won the Ulster Senior Football Championship in 2025.

== Hurling ==
=== Clubs ===
Clubs contest the Donegal Senior Hurling Championship.

Burt and Setanta Hurling Club have an archrivalry. They are the county's most prominent clubs in the sport.

=== County team ===
Donegal's first Ulster Senior Hurling Championship was won in 1906, its most recent in 1932.

In the 21st-century, Donegal won the 2011 Lory Meagher Cup. The county then became the first to win the Nicky Rackard Cup on three occasions, achieving this feat in 2020 after earlier wins in 2013 and 2018.

In 2019, following the 2018 Nicky Rackard win, the county made its debut in the Christy Ring Cup, the competition founded in place of the All-Ireland Senior B Hurling Championship.

== Ladies' football ==
Donegal has a ladies' football team.

Dominic McGlinchey resigned as senior manager in 2009 and Hughie Molloy took over temporarily until the end of the season. . Molloy was appointed new manager of the team in December 2012. Maxi Curran is now Donegal Senior Ladies Football Manager.

== Camogie ==
Donegal competed in the Ulster Senior Championship from the 1930s, hosting Antrim in Letterkenny in 1945. They succeeded in fielding a league team in the 1980s, drawing on the groundwork at Loreto, Letterkenny which fielded successful colleges teams. The Pan Celtic games of 2006 rejuvenated camogie in Donegal and the county returned to competition in the Ulster Junior Championship in 2008.

Under Camogie's National Development Plan 2010–2015, "Our Game, Our Passion", it was announced that Donegal, Kerry, Mayo and Monaghan would receive a total of 14 new clubs by 2015.

In 2026 Donegal fielded a senior team in the National League and the All Ireland Junior Championship for the first time.

== Eponyms ==
Several clubs in cities worldwide use the "Donegal" or "Tír Chonaill" name. These include:

- Donegal Boston, based in the United States
- Donegal Philadelphia, based in the United States
- Donegal New York, based in the United States
- Tír Chonaill Gaels, based in England
- Tír Conaill Harps, based in Scotland

== Statistics ==
Fr Seán Ó Gallchóir, the statistician, first compiled a twelve-page booklet in 1979 using his research into the newspaper archives of the Donegal Democrat, Donegal News and Derry Journal, which he personally gathered at their offices and compiled in scrapbooks. The Book of Donegal GAA Facts was first published in 1985. The eighth edition of the book launched in 2020. It is used by journalists wishing to verify information on Gaelic games in the county.
