= 2025 Joe McDonagh Cup =

Eighth staging of hurling competition

Joe McDonagh Cup 2025
- Corn Sheosaimh Mhic Dhonnacha

Tournament details
- Level: 2
- Year: 2025
- Trophy: Joe McDonagh Cup
- Dates: 19 April - 8 June 2025
- Teams: 6

Winners
- Champions: Kildare (1st win)
- Manager: Brian Dowling
- Captain: Rian Boran
- Qualify for: Joe McDonagh Cup Final; All-Ireland SHC

Runners-up
- Runners-up: Laois
- Manager: Tommy Fitzgerald
- Captain: Enda Rowland

Promotion/Relegation
- Promoted team(s): Kildare
- Relegated team(s): Kerry

Other
- Matches played: 16
- Total scored: 68-691 (55.94 points per game)
- Top Scorer: Martin Kavanagh (4-43)

The 2025 Joe McDonagh Cup was the eighth staging of the Joe McDonagh Cup since its establishment by the Gaelic Athletic Association in 2018.

Offaly, winner of the 2024 final, were promoted to the Leinster Senior Hurling Championship, replaced by Carlow who were relegated back to this competition. Kildare were promoted from the Christy Ring Cup.

The top two teams from the round robin stage played off in a final to decide the winner, both finalists also advancing to the 2025 All-Ireland Senior Hurling Championship knock-out stages. The bottom team was relegated to Christy Ring Cup.

== Team changes ==
=== To Championship ===
Relegated from the Leinster Senior Hurling Championship

- Carlow

Promoted from the Christy Ring Cup

- Kildare

=== From Championship ===
Promoted to the All-Ireland Senior Hurling Championship

- Offaly

Relegated to the Christy Ring Cup

- Meath

== Format ==
=== Cup format ===
Initially each of the six teams played the other five teams in single round-robin matches. The top two teams after the round robin games competed in the Joe McDonagh Cup final. The Joe McDonagh Cup champions and runners-up also advanced to the All-Ireland preliminary quarter-finals, with the Joe McDonagh Cup teams having home advantage.

==== Promotion ====
If the Joe McDonagh champion was a non-Munster team, they would be automatically promoted to the following year's Leinster Championship. If the champion was a Munster team, they would be automatically promoted to the following year's Munster Championship. The Joe McDonagh Cup winner would replace the bottom-placed team in the provincial championship containing six teams.

==== Relegation ====
The bottom-placed team in the Joe McDonagh Cup was automatically relegated to the following year's Christy Ring Cup and was replaced by the Christy Ring Cup winner.

=== Teams by province ===
The participating teams, listed by province, with numbers in parentheses indicating final positions in the 2025 National Hurling League before the championship were:

Leinster (4)

- Carlow (11)
- Kildare (16)
- Laois (13)
- Westmeath (14)

Munster (1)

- Kerry (17)

Ulster (1)

- Down (15)

== Teams ==
=== General Information ===
Six counties will compete in the Joe McDonagh Cup:

County	Last Cup Title	Last Provincial Title	Last All-Ireland Title	Position in 2024 Championship	Appearance
Carlow	2023	—	—	6th (Leinster Senior Hurling Championship)	6th
Down	—	1997	—	5th	5th
Kerry	—	1891	1891	3rd	8th
Kildare	—	—	—	Champions (Christy Ring Cup)	3rd
Laois	2019	1949	1915	Runners-up	5th
Westmeath	2021	—	—	4th	6th

=== Personnel and kits ===
County	Manager	Captain(s)	Sponsor
Carlow	Tom Mullally	Kevin McDonald	SETU
Down	Ronan Sheehan	Caolan Taggart and Eoghan Sands	EOS IT Solutions
Kerry	John Griffin	Tomás O'Connor	Kerry Group
Kildare	Brian Dowling	Rian Boran	Brady Family Ham
Laois	Tommy Fitzgerald	Enda Rowland	Laois Hire
Westmeath	Seoirse Bulfin	Aonghus Clarke and Killian Doyle	Renault

== Group Stage ==
=== Table ===
Pos	Team	Pld	W	D	L	SF	SA	Diff	Pts	Qualification
1	Kildare	5	4	0	1	10-112	6-90	+34	8	Advance to Final and All-Ireland Preliminary Quarter-Finals (PQ)
2	Laois	5	3	1	1	16-127	9-92	+56	7	Advance to Final and All-Ireland Preliminary Quarter-Finals (PQ)
3	Carlow	5	3	1	1	19-110	7-102	+44	7	
4	Westmeath	5	2	0	3	11-117	14-106	+2	4	
5	Down	5	1	0	4	4-92	17-128	-75	2	
6	Kerry	5	1	0	4	5-88	12-128	-61	2	Relegated to Christy Ring Cup (R)

- Laois proceed to both the Joe McDonagh Cup final on points difference over Carlow.
- Kerry are relegated on head-to-head record with Down.

=== Fixtures ===
==== Round 1 ====
19 April 2025 Round 1	Kildare	0-19 (19) – (20) 1-17	Kerry	Newbridge
14:00	David Qualter 0-10 (1’65, 4fs), Cathal McCabe 0-3, Gerry Keegan 0-2, Darragh Melville 0-2, Paul Dolan 0-1, Cian Boran 0-1	Report	Padraig Boyle 1-7 (5fs), Dylan Moriarty 0-5 (3fs, 1’65), Oisín Maunsell 0-3, Kevin Goulding 0-2	Stadium: St Conleth's Park; Referee: Colum Cunning (Antrim)

19 April 2025 Round 1	Carlow	6-23 (41) - (20) 0-20	Down	Carlow
14:30	Chris Nolan (3-1), James Doyle (1-3), Marty Kavanagh (0-6fs), Paddy Boland (1-1), Jon Nolan (0-3), Ciaran Whelan (0-3), Ted Joyce (1-0), Fiachra Fitzpatrick (0-2), Conor Kehoe (0-2), Donagh Murphy (0-2)	Report	Tom McGrattan (0-8 2-65s 6fs), Pearse Óg McCrickard (0-4), Paul Sheehan 0-3 (1-sl), Chris Egan (0-2), Caolan Taggart (0-1), Eoghan Sands (0-1), Tim Prenter (0-1)	Stadium: Dr Cullen Park; Referee: Colm McDonald (Antrim)

19 April 2025 Round 1	Laois	3-25 (34) – (25) 1-22	Westmeath	Portlaoise
15:00	Tomas Keyes 1-8 (0-3 frees, 0-1 65), Ben Conroy 1-2, Paddy Purcell and Jer Quinlan 0-4 each, Cha Dwyer 1-0, David Dooley 0-2, Martin Phelan, James Duggan, Jordan Walshe, Aidan Corby and Podge Delaney 0-1 each	Report	Killian Doyle 1-11 (1-6 frees), Peter Clarke 0-5, David O'Reilly 0-2, Robbie Greville, Niall O'Brien, Eamon Cuneen (65) and David Williams 0-1 each	Stadium: Laois Hire O'Moore Park; Referee: Brian Keon (Galway)

==== Round 2 ====
26 April 2025 Round 2	Down	1-12 (15) – (54) 6-36	Laois	Ballycran
13:30	P óg McCrickard 1-1; P Sheehan 0-4 (0-3f); E Sands & D Sands 0-2 each; M Fisher (65), C Taggart & T Prenter 0-1 each	Report	B Conroy 2-2; J Duggan 2-1; C Dwyer 1-4; T Keyes (0-6f) & J Quinlan (0-2f) 0-7 each; PJ Scully 1-2 (0-1f); A Corby 0-5; P Delaney (2f) & R Mullaney 0-2 each; FC Fennell, D Dooley, J Lennon & C Comerford 0-1	Stadium: McKenna Park

26 April 2025 Round 2	Kildare	3-24 (33) – (27) 2-21	Westmeath	Newbridge
16:30	J Sheridan 1-3 (3fs), J Burke 1-2, D Qualter (2fs), G Keegan 0-5, D Melville 1-0, P Dolan, C Boran 0-3, D O’Meara, C McCabe, C Dowling 0-1	Report	K Doyle 0-10 (8fs,1 65), D Williams 1-3, N O’Brien 0-5, P Clarke 1-0, D O’Reilly, Mark Cunningham, O McCabe 0-1	Stadium: St Conleth's Park; Referee: T Gleeson (Dublin)

27 April 2025 Round 2	Kerry	0-17 (17) - (36) 3-27	Carlow	Tralee
14:00	D Moriarty (0-6, fs), L Crowley and S Nolan (0-3 each), O Maunsell (0-2), P O’Connor, T Doyle, and S Brosnan (0-1 each)	Report	C Nolan (1-5), M Kavanagh (0-8.4fs), P Boland (1-2). C Kehoe (1-1), J Nolan (0-4), T Joyce (0-2), K McDonald (s/l), J Doyle, J McCullagh, J Treacy, and C Whelan (0-1 each)	Stadium: Austin Stack Park

==== Round 3 ====
10 May 2025 Round 3	Carlow	1-20 (23) - (29) 2-23	Kildare	Carlow
14:00	M Kavanagh 1-7 (1-0 pen, 5fs), James Doyle 0-4, C Nolan 0-3, C Kehoe, J Nolan 0-2 each, C Whelan, P Boland 0-1 each	Report	D Qualter 0-7 (fs), J Burke 0-5, C Dowling 1-1, G Keegan 0-4 (1f), each, J Sheridan 1-0, J Travers, D Melville 0-2 each, D Guerin, C McCabe 0-1 each	Stadium: Dr Cullen Park; Referee: Éamonn Furlong (Wexford)

10 May 2025 Round 3	Westmeath	2-24 (30) - (20) 0-20	Down	Mullingar
14:30	D Williams 1-6 (1-0 pen, 6f); E Cunneen 0-4; D O'Reilly, M Cunningham, N O'Brien 0-3 each; J Boyle 1-0; K Doyle 0-2 (1f); P Clarke, N Mitchell, D Hickey 0-1 each	Report	P Sheehan 0-11 (8f, 1 '65', 1 s/l); P Óg McCrickard, T Prenter, T Murray, E Sands 0-2 each; F Turpin 0-1	Stadium: TEG Cusack Park; Referee: Colum Cunning (Antrim)

11 May 2025 Round 3	Laois	5-28 (43) - (24) 1-21	Kerry	Portlaoise
16:00	J Duggan 5-2, T Keyes 0-7 (6fs, 1’65), A Dunphy 0-6 (3fs, 1’65), D Dooley 0-4, F C Fennell 0-3, M Dowling 0-2, P Delaney (1f), R Mullaney, P Purcell and W Dunphy 0-1 each	Report	S Nolan 0-11 (6fs), K Hayes 1-0, D Casey and O Maunsell 0-2 each, D Shanahan, K Goulding, R Walsh, T Doyle, L Crowley, and R Mahony 0-1 each	Stadium: Laois Hire O'Moore Park; Referee: Brian Keon (Galway)

==== Round 4 ====
17 May 2025 Round 4	Down	2-26 (32) - (25) 2-19	Kerry	Ballycran
14:00	F Turpin 1-4, P Og McCrickard 0-7 (1x65, 0-2f), D Sands 0-4, C Egan 1-0, D Hughes 0-3, T Prenter 0-3, P Sheehan 0-2f, E Sands 0-1, L Savage 0-1, C Taggart 0-1	Report	P Boyle 0-9 (0-8f), N Mulcahy 1-2, R Walsh 0-4, L Rochford 1-0, K Goulding, P O’Connor, K O’Connor, K Hayes 0-1 each	Stadium: McKenna Park; Referee: Chris Mooney (Dublin)

17 May 2025 Round 4	Westmeath	4-22 (34) - (44) 7-23	Carlow	Mullingar
16:00	K Doyle 0-8 (3fs, 1‘65’), M Cunningham 1-4, N O’Brien 1-3 (1-0pen), P Clarke 1-1, D Glennon 1-0, K Regan, D O’Reilly, D McCormack (1f) 0-2 each	Report	M Kavanagh 3-12 (1-0pen, 0-8fs, 0-2‘65’s), C Nolan 2-2, James Doyle 1-4, F Fitzpatrick 1-0, J McCullagh 0-2, C Whelan, John Doyle, J Nolan 0-1 each	Stadium: TEG Cusack Park; Referee: James Owens (Wexford)

18 May 2025 Round 4	Laois	1-18 (21) - (32) 4-20	Kildare	Portlaoise
15:00	T Keyes 0-7 (five frees), C Dwyer 1-1, P Purcell and A Corby 0-2 each, P Delaney (free), D Dooley, J Duggan, B Conroy, L Cleere and J Lennon 0-1 each	Report	D Qualter 1-6 (0-6 frees), J Sheridan 2-0, C McCabe 1-2, G Keegan and J Burke 0-3 each, R Boran, D Guerin, S Leacy, C Boran, C Dowling and D Melville 0-1 each	Stadium: Laois Hire O'Moore Park; Referee: Niall Malone (Clare)

==== Round 5 ====
24 May 2025 Round 5	Carlow	2-17 (23) - (23) 1-20	Laois	Carlow
14:00	M Kavanagh 0-10 (7fs, 2-65s), C Nolan, P Boland 1-1 each, J Doyle 0-2, JM Nolan, F Fitzpatrick, Jon Nolan 0-1 each	Report	T Keyes 0-14 (9fs 2-65s), James Duggan 1-1, J Quinlan, P Delaney (f), T Cuddy, C Dwyer (f), A Dunphy 0-1 each	Stadium: Netwatch Cullen Park; Referee: Caymon Flynn (Westmeath)

24 May 2025 Round 5	Kildare	1-26 (29) - (17) 1-14	Down	Newbridge
14:00	D Qualter 1-13 (12fs,1 65), G Keegan, D Melville 0-3 each, P Dolan, S Leacy, J Burke, C McCabe, C Dowling, J Travers, K Harrington 0-1 each	Report	P Sheehan 0-8 (7fs, 1 65), S Pucci 1-0, D Hughes 0-3, T Prenter, D Sands, F Turpin 0-1 each	Stadium: Cedral St Conleth's Park; Referee: Brian Keon (Galway)

24 May 2025 Round 5	Kerry	1-14 (17) - (34) 2-28	Westmeath	Tralee
14:00	P Boyle 0-6 (5fs), L Rochford 1-0, T Godley 0-2, K Goulding, K Hayes, N Mulcahy, S Nolan, S Horan, L Crowley 0-1 each	Report	K Doyle 0-15 (8fs, 1’65), D O’Reilly 1-6, N O’Brien 1-1, D Williams, P Clarke 0-2 each, K Regan, M Cunningham 0-1 each	Stadium: Austin Stack Park; Referee: Niall Malone (Clare)

== Final ==
8 June 2025 Final	Kildare	2-26 (32) – (22) 1-19	Laois	Dublin
				Venue: Croke Park
				TV: TG4

== Stadia and Locations ==
Locations of the 2025 Joe McDonagh Cup teams.

County	Location	Province	Stadium(s)	Capacity
Carlow	Carlow	Leinster	Dr Cullen Park	21,000
Down	Rubane	Ulster	McKenna Park	1,320
Kerry	Tralee	Munster	Austin Stack Park	12,000
Kildare	Newbridge	Leinster	St Conleth's Park	15,000
Laois	Portlaoise	Leinster	O'Moore Park	22,000
Westmeath	Mullingar	Leinster	TEG Cusack Park	11,500

== Statistics ==
=== Top Scorers ===
==== Overall ====
Rank	Player	County	Tally	Total	Matches	Average
1	Martin Kavanagh	Carlow	4-43	55	5	11.00
2	Killian Doyle	Westmeath	1-46	49	5	9.80
3	David Qualter	Kildare	2-67	73	5	9.40
4	Tomás Keyes	Laois	1-43	46	5	9.20
5	Chris Nolan	Carlow	7-12	33	5	6.60
6	James Duggan	Laois	8-06	30	5	6.00
7	Paul Sheehan	Down	0-28	28	5	5.60
8	Pádraig Boyle	Kerry	1-22	25	3	8.33
9	James Doyle	Carlow	2-13	19	5	3.80
10	Pearse Óg McCrickard	Down	1-14	17	5	3.60
10	Gerry Keegan	Kildare	0-17	17	5	3.60
10	David O'Reilly	Westmeath	1-14	17	5	3.60

==== In A Single Game ====
Rank	Player	County	Tally	Total	Opposition
1	Martin Kavanagh	Carlow	3-12	21	Westmeath
2	James Duggan	Laois	5-02	17	Kerry
3	David Qualter	Kildare	1-13	16	Down
4	Killian Doyle	Westmeath	0-15	15	Kerry
5	Killian Doyle	Westmeath	1-11	14	Laois
5	Tomás Keyes	Laois	0-14	14	Carlow
7	Tomás Keyes	Laois	1-08	11	Westmeath
7	Shane Nolan	Kerry	0-11	11	Laois
7	Paul Sheehan	Down	0-11	11	Westmeath
10	David Qualter	Kildare	0-10	10	Kerry
10	Pádraig Boyle	Kerry	1-07	10	Kildare
10	Chris Nolan	Carlow	3-01	10	Down
10	Killian Doyle	Westmeath	0-10	10	Kildare
10	Martin Kavanagh	Carlow	1-07	10	Kildare
10	Martin Kavanagh	Carlow	0-10	10	Laois

=== Scoring events ===
- Widest winning margin: 39 points
  - Down 1-12 - 6-36 Laois (Round 2)
- Most goals in a match: 11
  - Westmeath 4-22 - 7-23 Carlow (Round 4)
- Most points in a match: 49
  - Laois 5-28 - 1-21 Kerry (Roynd 3)
- Most goals by one team in a match: 7
  - Westmeath 4-22 - 7-23 Carlow (Round 4)
- Most points by one team in a match: 36
  - Down 1-12 - 6-36 Laois (Round 2)
- Highest aggregate score: 78 points
  - Westmeath 4-22 - 7-23 Carlow (Round 4)
- Lowest aggregate score: 39 points
  - Kildare 0-19 - 1-17 Kerry (Round 1)
- Hat-trick Heros:
  - Chris Nolan (Carlow) 3-01 v Down (Round 1)
  - James Duggan (Laois) 5-02 v Kerry (Round 3)
  - Martin Kavanagh (Carlow) 3-12 v Westmeath (Round 4)

== See also ==
- 2025 All-Ireland Senior Hurling Championship (Tier 1)
- 2025 Leinster Senior Hurling Championship
- 2025 Munster Senior Hurling Championship
- 2025 Christy Ring Cup (Tier 3)
- 2025 Nicky Rackard Cup (Tier 4)
- 2025 Lory Meagher Cup (Tier 5)
