= 2025 Lory Meagher Cup =

Hurling tournament in Ireland

- Corn Labhraí Uí Mheachair

Tournament details
- Year: 2025
- Trophy: Lory Meagher Cup
- Dates: 12 April - 31 May 2025
- Teams: 7

Winners
- Champions: New York (1st win)
- Manager: Richie Hartnett
- Captain: Johnny Glynn
- Qualify for: Lory Meagher Cup Knockout Stage

Runners-up
- Runners-up: Cavan
- Manager: Olli Bellew
- Captain: Enda Shavley

Promotion/Relegation
- Promoted team(s): New York

Other
- Matches played: 17
- Total scored: 64-585 (45.71 per game)
- Top Scorer: Liam O'Brien (1-49)

The 2025 Lory Meagher Cup was the seventeenth edition of the Lory Meagher Cup since its establishment by the Gaelic Athletic Association in 2009 and is the fifth-tier of Hurling for senior county teams (the All-Ireland Senior Hurling Championship is the first-tier trophy). It is contested by seven GAA county teams ranked 30–36 in the 2025 All-Ireland Senior Hurling Championship. The competition runs from 12 April to 31 May 2025.

Fermanagh, winner of the 2024 final, were promoted to the Nicky Rackard Cup, replaced by Monaghan who were relegated back to this competition.

The top team from the round robin stage will play off against the semi-final winner in the final to decide the winner. The Lory Meagher Cup Final was played on 31 May 2025 at Croke Park in Dublin. New York defeated Cavan by 4-17 to 2-17.

New York competed in an All-Ireland Senior Hurling Championship competition for the first-time in their history, previously competing in the Ulster Senior Hurling Championship and Connacht Hurling League, which they won in 2024.

== Team changes ==
=== To Championship ===
Relegated from the Nicky Rackard Cup

- Monaghan

Debutant

- New York

=== From Championship ===
Promoted to the Nicky Rackard Cup

- Fermanagh

== Format ==
=== Cup format ===
Initially six teams play the each other five teams in single round-robin matches. The second-placed team after the round robin games will compete against New York in the Lory Meagher Cup Semi-Final. The top team after the round robin games compete in the Lory Meagher Cup Final.

==== Promotion ====
The Lory Meagher Cup champions are automatically promoted to the following year's Nicky Rackard Cup and are replaced by the bottom-placed team in the Nicky Rackard Cup. In the case that New York are champions, no team will relegated from the Nicky Rackard Cup.

=== Teams by province ===
The participating teams, listed by province, with numbers in parentheses indicating final positions in the 2025 National Hurling League before the championship were:

Britain (2)

- Lancashire (34)
- Warwickshire (33)

Connacht (1)

- Leitrim (31)

Leinster (1)

- Longford (32)

Munster (0)

- None participated

Ulster (2)

- Cavan (27)
- Monaghan (35)

North America (1)

- New York (DNP)

== Teams ==
=== General Information ===
County	Last Cup Title	Last Provincial Title	Last All-Ireland Title	Position in 2024 Championship	Appearance
Cavan	—	—	—	3rd	11th
Lancashire	—	—	—	6th	9th
Leitrim	2019	—	—	4th	14th
Longford	2014	—	—	Runners-up	11th
Monaghan	2023	1915	—	6th (Nicky Rackard Cup)	4th
New York	—	—	—	N/A	1st
Warwickshire	2017	—	—	5th	12th

=== Personnel and kits ===
County	Manager	Captain(s)	Sponsor
Cavan	Ollie Bellew	Enda Shalvey	Kingspan
Lancashire	Liam Óg Knocker		Allied Fire Protection
Leitrim	Mike Wall	Conor Hackett and Joe Murray	Gallagher Group
Longford	Diarmuid Cahill	Reuben Murray	Glennon Brothers
Monaghan	Arthur Hughes	Aaron Kenny and Hugh Byrne	Activ8 Energies
New York	Richie Hartnett	Johnny Glynn	Navillus Contracting
Warwickshire	Jamie Lynch		HireSafe Solutions

== Group stage ==
=== Table ===
Pos	Team	Pld	W	D	L	SF	SA	Diff	Pts	Qualification
1	Cavan	5	4	0	1	13-115	9-71	+56	8	Advance to Final
2	Monaghan	5	3	1	1	13-84	8-79	+20	7	Advance to Semi-Final
3	Longford	5	2	2	1	11-86	6-95	+6	6	
4	Leitrim	5	2	1	2	4-69	7-66	-6	5	
5	Lancashire	5	1	0	4	5-83	16-86	-36	2	
6	Warwickshire	5	1	0	4	9-72	9-112	-40	2	

=== Round 1 ===
12 April 2025 Round 1	Lancashire	0-16 (16) - (33) 4-21	Longford	Abbottstown
14:00	Peter Boylan (0-6), Eoghan Clifford (0-4, 1 free), Conor Levingstone (0-4, 3 frees), Jason Patton (0-2, 1 free)	Report	Martin Farrell (2-8, 2 frees, 1 ‘65), Reuben Murray (0-8, 4 frees), Evan Tully (1-1), Micheal Mulcahy (1-0) Johnny Casey (0-3), Niall Hawes (0-1)	Stadium: Abbottstown GAA CoE; Referee: Conor Daly (Kildare)

12 April 2025 Round 1	Monaghan	2-13 (19) - (9) 0-09	Leitrim	Inniskeen
15:00	N Arthur (0-9 6f), E Walsh 1-0, R McMahon 1-0, N Garland 0-2, C Boyle 0-1, J Slevin 0-1	Report	J Murray 0-5 (1 65, 3f), S O'Riordan 0-2, P Burgess 0-1, S Goldrick 0-1	Stadium: Grattan Park; Referee: Michael Connolly (Sligo)

13 April 2025 Round 1	Warwickshire	1-11 (14) - (44) 4-32	Cavan	Birmingham
12:30	Jordan Conway 1-3 (0-1f), Miley Connors 0-3, Eoghan O'Sullivan 0-1, Éamon Brannigan 0-1, Liam Fahy 0-1, 10th & 11th points	Report	Seán Keating 2-5; Liam O'Brien 0-8 (0-3f, 0-1 '65); Nicholas Kenny 1-5 (0-1f); Éamon Óg McAllister 1-3; Diarmaid Carney 0-3; Colum Sheanon, Jack McGuinness, Thomas Leonard 0-2 each; Dillion Mulligan, Rian Delaney 0-1 each	Stadium: Páirc na hÉireann

=== Round 2 ===
19 April 2025 Round 2	Leitrim	1-13 (16) - (15) 1-12	Lancashire	Longford
12:00	J Murray 1-4 (4fs, 1-0pen), D Keane 0-3, M O’Brien, J McNabola, M Feeney, S Burgess, S O’Riordan, S Goldrick 0-1 each	Report	P Boylan 0-7, C Levingstone 0-5 (5fs), S O’Boyle 1-0	Stadium: Glennon Brothers Pearse Park; Referee: Kevin Brady (Louth)

19 April 2025 Round 2	Longford	1-14 (17) - (16) 0-16	Warwickshire	Longford
14:00	M Farrell 1-2 (1f), R Murray (3fs), N Hawes 0-3 each, S Lancaster, D Caslin, D Hayes, E Allen, D Buckley, M Mulcahy 0-1 each	Report	L Fahy, J Conway (2fs), M Connors (1f) 0-4 each, O Slattery, I Dwyer 0-2 each	Stadium: Glennon Brothers Pearse Park; Referee: Adam Kinahan (Offaly)

19 April 2025 Round 3	Cavan	2-20 (26) - (17) 1-14	Monaghan	Cavan
15:00	L O’Brien (0-11, 9f), S Keating (1-4), N Kenny (1-2), C Sheanon (0-1), J McGuinness (0-1), P Brady (0-1). Monaghan: L Moloney (0-6, 3f), S Slevin (1-0); O Hagan (0-3), N Garland (0-3), J Slevin (0-2)	Report	L Moloney (0-6, 3f), S Slevin (1-0); O Hagan (0-3), N Garland (0-3), J Slevin (0-2)	Stadium: Kingspan Breffni Park; Referee: P Owens (Down)

=== Round 3 ===
26 April 2025 Round 3	Longford	1-14 (17) - (17) 1-14	Leitrim	Longford
12:00	Reuben Murray (0-6, 4 frees, 1 ‘65); Martin Farrell (0-5, 4 frees); Niall Hawes (1-1); David Buckley (0-2)	Report	Joe Murray (0-6, frees); Sean O’Riordan (1-1); Michael O’Brien (0-2), Stephen Goldrick (0-2), Philip Burgess (0-2); Dhani Keane (0-1)	Stadium: Glennon Brothers Pearse Park

26 April 2025 Round 3	Monaghan	4-22 (34) - (21) 2-15	Warwickshire	Inniskeen
12:30	L Moloney 0-9 (7f 1 ’65); S Slevin 2-2; J Slevin 1-2; M Lyons 1-1; J Brady 0-3; N Garland 0-2; R McMahon 0-1; O Hagan 0-1; C Boyle 0-1	Report	J Grealish 2-6 (0-3f); M Connors 0-4 (1f); S Murphy 0-2; O Slattery 0-1; L Fahy 0-1; J Collins 0-1	Stadium: Grattan Park; Referee: C Daly (Kildare)

26 April 2025 Round 3	Cavan	3-24 (33) - (20) 2-14	Lancashire	Cavan
13:00	Liam O'Brien 0-10 (0-8f); Seán Keating 1-4; Nicholas Kenny 1-2; Éamon Óg McAllister 0-3; Stephen Sheridan 1-0; Diarmaid Carney 0-2; Jack McGuinness, Colum Sheanon 0-1 each,15th point,	Report	Paudraic Burke 1-5 (0-4f, 0-1 '65); Colin McNamara, Darren Grealish, Shane O'Boyle, Andrew Shanahan, Eoghan Clifford, Darren McNamara 0-1 each, 5th, 10th & 14th points, (1-0p)	Stadium: Kingspan Breffni Park

=== Round 4 ===
10 May 2025 Round 4	Lancashire	2-15 (21) - (27) 4-15	Monaghan	Abbottstown
13:30		Report		Stadium: Abbottstown GAA CoE; Referee: Nicholas Barry (Waterford)

10 May 2025 Round 4	Longford	3-17 (26) - (38) 3-29	Cavan	Longford
14:00	M Farrell 0-9 (7fs), J Rabbitt, M Mulcahy 1-1 each, R Murray 0-4 (2fs, 1’65), R Courtney 1-0, D Hawes, A Devine 0-1 each	Report	L O’Brien 0-13 (6fs), S Keating 1-3, J McGuiness 0-5, E Óg McAllister, J Barry 1-2 each, N Kenny 0-2, D Mulligan, D Martin 0-1 each	Stadium: Glennon Brothers Pearse Park; Referee: Conor Doyle (Tipperary)

11 May 2025 Round 4	Warwickshire	2-17 (23) - (18) 0-18	Leitrim	Birmingham
14:00	Jack Grealish 1-4 (0-3f); Éamonn Brannigan, Miley Connors 0-5 each; Luke Hands 1-0; Joe O'Connor, Ian Dwyer 0-1 each		Seán O'Riordan 0-8 (0-8f); Joe Murray 0-2; Conor Hackett, Brían Goldrick, Martin Feeney, Stephen Goldrick, Philip Burgess, James McNabola, Dhani Keane, Connor McLoughlin 0-1 each	Stadium: Páirc na hÉireann

=== Round 5 ===
17 May 2025 Round 5	Warwickshire	4-13 (25) - (26) 0-26	Lancashire	Birmingham
14:00				Stadium: Páirc na hÉireann

17 May 2025 Round 5	Monaghan	2-20 (26) - (26) 2-20	Longford	Inniskeen
14:00	Niall Arthur 0-15 (0-11f); James Slevin 1-1; Emmet Walsh 1-0; Niall Garland 0-2; Leo Moloney, James Brady 0-1 each	Report	David Buckley 1-2; Martin Farrell 0-5 (0-2f); Reuben Murray 0-4 (0-2f); Niall Hawes, Alan Devine 0-3; Ronan Courtney 1-0; Adam Quinn 0-2; Michael Mulcahy, Joe Rabbitt 0-1 each, 0-1 unknown	Stadium: Grattan Park; Referee: Aidan McAleer (Donegal)

17 May 2025 Round 5	Cavan	1-10 (13) - (21) 2-15	Leitrim	Cavan
14:00	J Smith 0-3 (3f); E Óg McAllister 1-0; F Hughes, T Leonard (1f) 0-2 each; R Delaney, M Moffett, J McGuinness 0-1 each	Report	J Murray 1-4; G O'Brien 1-1; S O'Riordan 0-3 (3f); J McNabola, M O'Brien 0-2 each; C Cunniffe (1f), S Keane, A Gavigan 0-1 each	Stadium: Kingspan Breffni Park; Referee: K Brady (Louth)

== Knockout Stage ==
=== Bracket ===
Semi-Final		Final
		Cavan	2-17
New York	1-29	New York	4-17
Monaghan	2-13

=== Semi-Final ===
24 May 2025 Semi-Final	New York	1-29 (32) – (19) 2-13	Monaghan	Mullingar
13:00				Venue: TEG Cusack Park
	Pts: D Mangan 0-10 (6f, e), Barry 0-1, D Moran 0-1, J Glynn 0-2, AJ Willis 1-9, A Loughlin 0-3, C Mullane 0-1, T O'Meara 0-1, G McPartland 0-1	Report	Pts: N Arthur 0-9 (7f), P Malone 0-1, C McHugh 0-1, E Flynn 0-1, K Crawley 0-1, S Slevin 2-0

=== Final ===
31 May 2025 Final	Cavan	2-17 (23) – (29) 4-17	New York	Dublin
15:00				Venue: Croke Park
	Pts: L O’Brien 1-7 (1-0pen, 0-6f); N Kenny 1-1; Cillian Sheanon, J McGuinness 0-2 each; D Mulligan, C Maher, E Óg McAllister, S Keating, R Delaney 0-1 apiece	Report	Pts: D Mangan 1-7 (1-0pen, 0-2 ‘65’, 0-1 f); AJ Willis, D Walsh 1-1 each; T O’Connor 1-0; A Loughlin Stones 0-3; J Glynn 0-2; T O’Meara, C Hammersley, A Organ 0-1 apiece	Referee: K Parke (Antrim); TV: Spórt TG4

New York wins the Lory Meagher Cup. As a result, Fermanagh retain their status in the Nicky Rackard Cup for 2026.

== Stadia and Locations ==
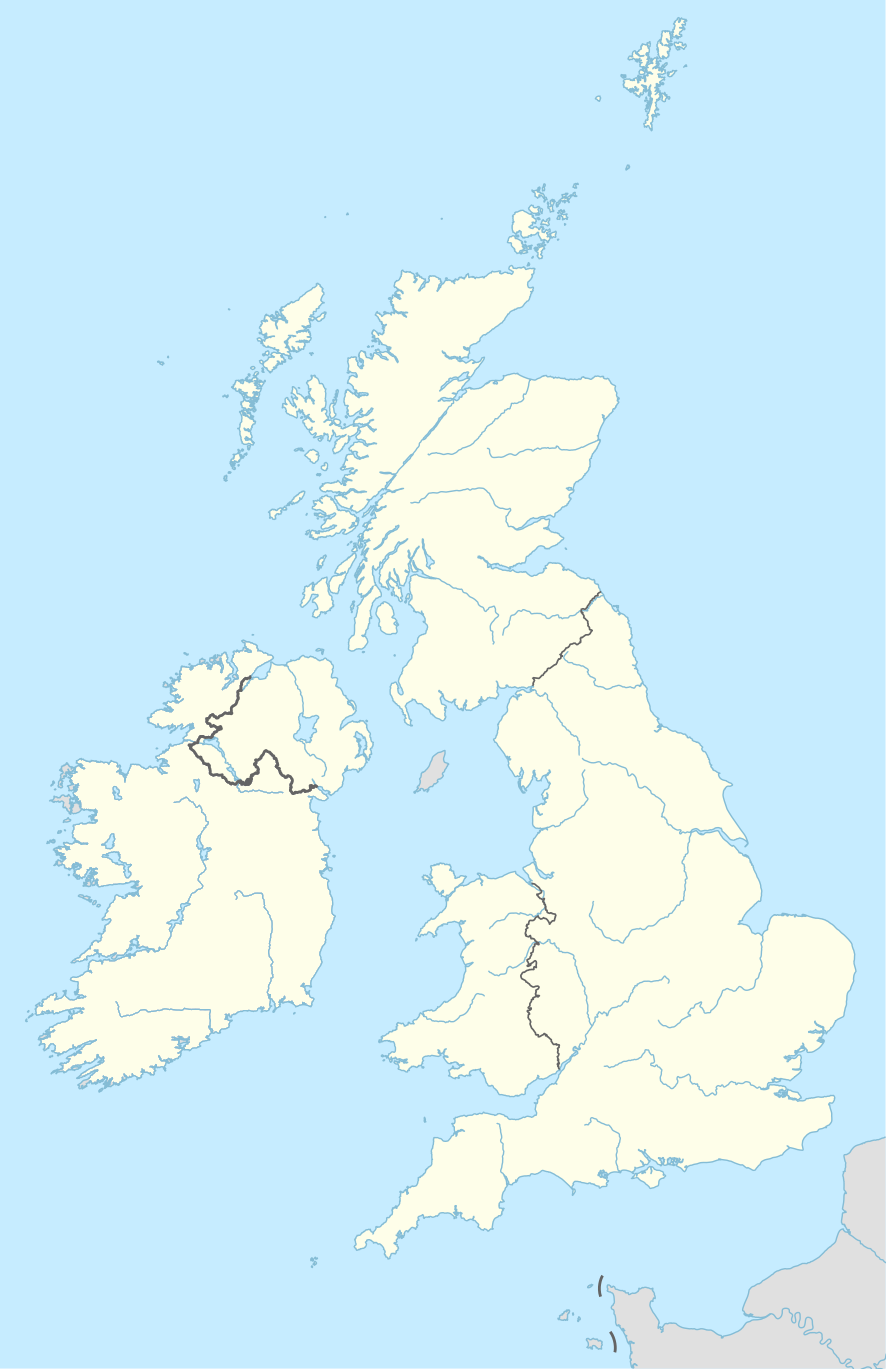
Locations of the 2025 Lory Meagher counties.
2025 Lory Meagher Cup (New York)

County	Location	Province	Stadium(s)	Capacity
Neutral	Dublin	Leinster	Croke Park	82,300
Cavan	Cavan	Ulster	Breffni Park	25,030
Lancashire	East Didsbury	Britain	Old Bedians	
Leitrim	Carrick-on-Shannon	Connacht	Páirc Seán Mac Diarmada	9,331
Longford	Longford	Leinster	Pearse Park	10,000
Monaghan	Clones	Ulster	St Tiernach's Park	29,000
New York	Bronx	USA	Gaelic Park	2,000
Warwickshire	Solihull	Britain	Páirc na hÉireann	

== Statistics ==
=== Top Scorers ===
Overall

Rank	Player	County	Tally	Total	Matches	Average
1	Liam O'Brien	Cavan	1-49	52	5	10.40
2	Martin Farrell	Longford	3-29	38	5	7.60
3	Niall Arthur	Monaghan	0-33	33	3	11.00
4	Seán Keating	Cavan	5-17	32	5	6.40
5	Joe Murray	Leitrim	2-21	27	5	5.40
6	Reuben Murray	Longford	0-25	25	5	5.00
7	Nicholas Kenny	Cavan	4-12	24	5	4.80
8	David Mangan	New York	1-17	20	2	10.00
9	Jack Grealish	Warwickshire	3-10	19	4	4.75
10	Seán O'Riordan	Leitrim	1-15	18	5	3.60

In A Single Game

Rank	Player	County	Tally	Total	Opposition
1	Niall Arthur	Monaghan	0-15	15	Longford
2	Martin Farrell	Longford	2-08	14	Lancashire
3	Liam O'Brien	Cavan	0-13	13	Longford
4	Jack Grealish	Warwickshire	2-06	12	Monaghan
4	AJ Willis	New York	1-09	12	Monaghan
6	Seán Keating	Cavan	2-05	11	Warwickshire
6	Liam O'Brien	Cavan	0-11	11	Monaghan
8	Liam O'Brien	Cavan	0-10	10	Lancashire
8	David Mangan	New York	0-10	10	Monaghan
8	Liam O'Brien	Cavan	1-07	10	New York
8	David Mangan	New York	1-07	10	Cavan

=== Scoring events ===
- Widest winning margin: 30 points
  - Warwickshire 1-11 - 4-32 Cavan (Round 1)
- Most goals in a match: 6
  - Monaghan 4-22 - 2-15 Warwickshire (Round 3)
  - Lancashire 2-15 - 4-15 Monaghan (Round 4)
  - Longford 3-17 - 3-29 Cavan (Round 4)
- Most points in a match: 46
  - Longford 3-17 - 3-29 Cavan (Round 4)
- Most goals by one team in a match: 4
  - Warwickshire 1-11 - 4-32 Cavan (Round 1)
  - Monaghan 4-22 - 2-15 Warwickshire (Round 3)
  - Lancashire 2-15 - 4-15 Monaghan (Round 4)
  - Warwickshire 4-13 - 0-16 Lancashire (Round 5)
- Most points by one team in a match: 32
  - Warwickshire 1-11 - 4-32 Cavan (Round 1)
- Highest aggregate score: 64 points
  - Longford 3-17 - 3-29 Cavan (Round 4)
- Lowest aggregate score: 28 points
  - Monaghan 2-13 - 0-09 Leitrim (Round 1)

== See also ==
- 2025 All-Ireland Senior Hurling Championship
- 2025 Leinster Senior Hurling Championship
- 2025 Munster Senior Hurling Championship
- 2025 Joe McDonagh Cup (Tier 2)
- 2025 Christy Ring Cup (Tier 3)
- 2025 Nicky Rackard Cup (Tier 4)
