= 2025 All-Ireland Senior Hurling Championship =

Championship details
- Dates: 19 April — 20 July 2025
- Teams: 17 (All-Ireland); 36 (overall)

All-Ireland champions
- Winning team: Tipperary (29th win)
- Captain: Ronan Maher
- Manager: Liam Cahill

All-Ireland Finalists
- Losing team: Cork
- Captain: Robert Downey
- Manager: Pat Ryan

Provincial champions
- Munster: Cork
- Leinster: Kilkenny
- Ulster: Not Played
- Connacht: Not Played

Championship statistics
- Top Scorer: Seán Currie (4–68)
- All-Star Team: See here

The 2025 All-Ireland Senior Hurling Championship (SHC) was the 138th staging of the All-Ireland Senior Hurling Championship, the Gaelic Athletic Association's premier inter-county hurling tournament, since its establishment in 1887.

Clare entered the competition as the defending champion, having won a first All-Ireland SHC title since 2013. However, they were eliminated in the Munster championship where they finished fourth, thus failing to defend their title.

Cork were widely considered the favourites; the team finished as runner-up in the previous edition of the competition and won the 2025 National Hurling League, but have not won an All-Ireland SHC title since 2005. Kilkenny (last winner in 2015) were also considered a serious contender. Limerick (winners in 2018 and in 2020–23) were also considered major contenders, until they were eliminated by Dublin in the quarter finals.

The final was played on 20 July at Croke Park in Dublin with Cork facing off against Tipperary, Tipperary came out as winners on a scoreline of 3–27 to 1–18, to earn their first title since 2019.

== Format ==
=== Leinster Championship ===
==== Participating counties (6) ====
Antrim, Dublin, Galway, Kilkenny, Offaly, Wexford

==== Group stage (15 matches) ====
Each team played each other once. The 1st and 2nd placed teams advanced to the Leinster SHC final and the 3rd placed team advanced to the All-Ireland SHC preliminary quarter-finals. All other teams were eliminated from the championship and the bottom placed team risked facing relegation to the following year's Joe McDonagh Cup.

==== Final (1 match) ====
The top 2 teams in the group stage contested this game. The Leinster champions advanced to the All-Ireland SHC semi-finals and the Leinster runners-up advanced to the All-Ireland SHC quarter-finals.

=== Munster Championship ===
==== Participating counties (5) ====
Clare, Cork, Limerick, Tipperary, Waterford

==== Group stage (10 matches) ====
Each team played each other once. The 1st and 2nd placed teams advanced to the Munster SHC final and the 3rd placed team advanced to the All-Ireland SHC preliminary quarter-finals. All other teams were eliminated from the championship and the bottom placed team risked facing relegation to the following year's Joe McDonagh Cup.

==== Final (1 match) ====
The top 2 teams in the group stage contested this game. The Munster champions advanced to the All-Ireland SHC semi-finals and the Munster runners-up advanced to the All-Ireland SHC quarter-finals.

=== Joe McDonagh Cup ===
==== Participating counties (6) ====
Carlow, Down, Kerry, Kildare, Laois, Westmeath

==== Group stage (15 matches) ====
Each team plays each other once. The 1st and 2nd placed teams advance to the Joe McDonagh Cup final. All other teams are eliminated from the championship and the bottom placed team are relegated to next years Christy Ring Cup.

==== Final (1 match) ====
The top 2 teams in the group stage contest this game. The Joe McDonagh Cup champions and runners-up advance to the All-Ireland preliminary quarter-finals.

=== All-Ireland Championship ===
==== Preliminary quarter-finals (2 matches) ====
The 3rd placed teams from the Leinster and Munster championships played the Joe McDonagh Cup champions and runners-up. Two teams were eliminated at this stage, while the winners advanced to the All-Ireland SHC quarter-finals.

==== Quarter-finals (2 matches) ====
The winners of the preliminary quarter-finals join the Leinster and Munster runners-up to make up the quarter-final pairings. Teams who may have already met in the provincial championships are kept apart in separate quarter-finals. Two teams are eliminated at this stage while the winners advance to the semi-finals.

==== Semi-finals (2 matches) ====
The winners of the quarter-finals join the Leinster and Munster champions to make up the semi-final pairings. Teams who may have already met in the provincial championships are kept apart in separate semi-finals where possible. Two teams are eliminated at this stage while the winners advance to the final.

==== Final (1 match) ====
The two winners of the semi-finals contest this game.

== Team changes ==
=== To Championship ===
Promoted from the Christy Ring Cup

- Kildare

=== From Championship ===
Relegated to the Christy Ring Cup

- Meath

== Teams ==
=== General information ===
Seventeen counties competed in the All-Ireland Senior Hurling Championship: six teams in the Leinster Senior Hurling Championship, five teams in the Munster Senior Hurling Championship and six teams in the Joe McDonagh Cup.

County	Last provincial title	Last championship title	Position in 2024 Championship	Current championship
Antrim	2017	—	5th (Leinster Senior Hurling Championship)	Leinster Senior Hurling Championship
Carlow	—	—	6th (Leinster Senior Hurling Championship)	Joe McDonagh Cup
Clare	1998	2024	Champions	Munster Senior Hurling Championship
Cork	2018	2005	Runners-up	Munster Senior Hurling Championship
Down	1997	—	5th (Joe McDonagh Cup)	Joe McDonagh Cup
Dublin	2013	1938	Quarter-finals	Leinster Senior Hurling Championship
Galway	2018	2017	4th (Leinster Senior Hurling Championship)	Leinster Senior Hurling Championship
Kerry	1891	1891	3rd (Joe McDonagh Cup)	Joe McDonagh Cup
Kildare	—	—	1st (Christy Ring Cup)	Joe McDonagh Cup
Kilkenny	2024	2015	Semi-finals	Leinster Senior Hurling Championship
Laois	1949	1915	Preliminary quarter-finals	Joe McDonagh Cup
Limerick	2024	2023	Semi-finals	Munster Senior Hurling Championship
Offaly	1995	1998	Preliminary quarter-finals	Leinster Senior Hurling Championship
Tipperary	2016	2019	5th (Munster Senior Hurling Championship)	Munster Senior Hurling Championship
Waterford	2010	1959	4th (Munster Senior Hurling Championship)	Munster Senior Hurling Championship
Westmeath	—	—	3rd (Joe McDonagh Cup)	Joe McDonagh Cup
Wexford	2019	1996	Quarter-finals	Leinster Senior Hurling Championship

=== Personnel and kits ===
County	Manager	Captain(s)	Sponsor
Antrim	Davy Fitzgerald	Conor McCann	Fibrus
Carlow	Tom Mullally	Kevin McDonald	SETU
Clare	Brian Lohan	Tony Kelly	Pat O'Donnell
Cork	Pat Ryan	Rob Downey	Sports Direct
Down	Ronan Sheehan	Caolan Taggart and Eoghan Sands	EOS IT Solutions
Dublin	Niall Ó Ceallacháin	Paddy Smyth	Staycity
Galway	Micheál Donoghue	Conor Whelan	Supermac's
Kerry	John Griffin	Tomás O'Connor	Kerry Group
Kildare	Brian Dowling	Rian Boran	Brady Family Ham
Kilkenny	Derek Lyng	Richie Reid and Eoin Cody	Avonmore
Laois	Tommy Fitzgerald	Enda Rowland	Laois Hire
Limerick	John Kiely	Cian Lynch	JP McManus
Offaly	Johnny Kelly	Jason Sampson	Glenisk
Tipperary	Liam Cahill	Ronan Maher	Fiserv
Waterford	Peter Queally	Dessie Hutchinson	Suir Engineering
Westmeath	Seoirse Bulfin	Aonghus Clarke and Killian Doyle	Renault
Wexford	Keith Rossiter	Lee Chin and Kevin Foley	Zurich Insurance Group

=== Teams by Province ===
The participating teams, listed by province, with numbers in parentheses indicating final positions in the 2025 National Hurling League (after promotion and relegation are applied and after finals are played) before the championship were:

Connacht (1)

- Galway (3)

Leinster (8)

- Carlow (11)
- Dublin (10)
- Kildare (14)
- Kilkenny (4)
- Laois (15)
- Offaly (7)
- Westmeath (16)
- Wexford (8)

Munster (6)

- Clare (9)
- Cork (1)
- Kerry (17)
- Limerick (5)
- Tipperary (2)
- Waterford (6)

Ulster (2)

- Antrim (12)
- Down (13)

== Summary ==
=== Championships ===
Competition	Year	Champions	Title	Runners-up	Level on pyramid
All-Ireland Senior Hurling Championship	2025	Tipperary	29th	Cork	1
Leinster Senior Hurling Championship	2025	Kilkenny	77th	Galway	1
Munster Senior Hurling Championship	2025	Cork	55th	Limerick	1
Joe McDonagh Cup	2025	Kildare	1st	Laois	2
Christy Ring Cup	2025	London	2nd	Derry	3
Nicky Rackard Cup	2025	Roscommon	3rd	Mayo	4
Lory Meagher Cup	2025	New York	1st	Cavan	5

== Provincial Championships ==
=== Leinster Senior Hurling Championship ===
==== Group Stage ====
Pos	Team	Pld	W	D	L	SF	SA	Diff	Pts	Qualification
1	Kilkenny	5	4	0	1	15–113	9–89	+42	8	Advance to Leinster Final
2	Galway	5	4	0	1	9–131	10–83	+45	8	Advance to Leinster Final
3	Dublin	5	3	0	2	13–112	11–105	+13	6	Advance to All-Ireland preliminary quarter-finals
4	Wexford	5	3	0	2	12–95	6–106	+7	6	
5	Offaly	5	1	0	4	9–81	10–108	−30	2	
6	Antrim (R)	5	0	0	5	4–80	16–121	–77	0	Relegation to Joe McDonagh Cup

==== Round 1 ====
19 April 2025 Round 1	Wexford	2–24 (30) – (19) 0–19	Antrim	Wexford
14:00	Lee Chin 0–16 (12 frees), Conor Hearne, Rory O’Connor 0–3 each, Kevin Foley, Cian Byrne 1–0 each, Cathal Dunbar, Seamus Casey 0–1 each	Report	James McNaughton 0–8 (6 frees), Gerard Walsh 0–4 (1 penalty, 2 frees), Keelan Molloy 0–3, Nigel Elliott, Seann Elliott, Joe McLaughlin, Eoin O’Neill 0–1 each	Stadium: Wexford Park; Attendance: 4,774; Referee: Colm Lyons (Cork)

19 April 2025 Round 1	Kilkenny	3–24 (33) – (21) 0–21	Galway	Kilkenny
15:45	Eoin Cody (1–5, 2fs), Martin Keoghan (1–2), Fionan Mackessy (0–4, 1f and 1 '65), Adrian Mullen (1–0), Jordan Molloy (0–3), Billy Ryan, Cian Kenny, Mikey Carey, Stephen Donnelly (0–2 each), John Donnelly, Luke Hogan (0–1 each)	Report	Cathal Mannion (0–10, 6fs), Cianan Fahy, John Fleming, Conor Cooney (0–2 each), Conor Whelan, Declan McLoughlin, Tiernan Killeen, TJ Brennan, Gavin Lee (0–1 each)	Stadium: Nowlan Park; Attendance: 8,243; Referee: Sean Stack (Dublin)

19 April 2025 Round 1	Dublin	1–25 (28) – (25) 2–19	Offaly	Dublin
18:00	Sean Currie 0–9 (5fs), Ronan Hayes 1–1, Donal Burke 0–4 (2fs, 1 65), Conor Donohoe 0–3, Brian Hayes 0–3, Conor Burke 0–2, Diarmaid O Dulaing 0–1, Chris Crummey 0–1, John Hetherton 0–1.	Report	Brian Duignan 0–8 (6fs), Killian Sampson 1–2, Dan Ravenhill 0–5 (3fs), Oisin Kelly 1–1, Charlie Mitchell 0–1, Ross Ravenhill 0–1, Dan Bourke 0–1.	Stadium: Parnell Park; Attendance: 5,394; Referee: Johnny Murphy (Limerick)

==== Round 2 ====
26 April 2025 Round 2	Dublin	3–26 (35) – (31) 4–19	Wexford	Dublin
16:30	Sean Currie (1–11, 0-08f, 1-00pen), John Hetherton (2-03), Cian O'Sullivan (0-03), Darragh Power (0-02), Brian Hayes (0-02), Paddy Dunleavy (0-01), Chris Crummey (0-01), Conor Donohoe (0-01), Ronan Hayes (0-01), Colin Currie (0-01)	Report	Lee Chin (1-07, 1-05f), Rory O'Connor (1-02), Cathal Dunbar (1-01); Cian Byrne (1-01), Kevin Foley (0-02), Simon Donohoe (0-02), Conor Hearne (0-02), Damien Reck (0-01), Richie Lawlor (0-01)	Stadium: Parnell Park; Attendance: 7,734; Referee: Michael Kennedy (Tipperary)

26 April 2025 Round 2	Offaly	1–14 (17) – (31) 2–25	Galway	Tullamore
18:30	Brian Duignan 0–5 (4fsf), Killian Sampson 1–1, Adam Screeney 0–3 (2fs), Charlie Mitchell 0–2, Dan Ravenhill 0–2 (0-1f), Oisín Kelly 0–1	Report	Cathal Mannion 2–8 (1–0 65, 3fs), Colm Molloy 0–5, Brian Concannon 0–3, TJ Brennan 0–3, Conor Whelan 0–2, David Burke 0–1, Tiernan Killeen 0–1, Cianán Fahy 0–1, John Fleming 0–1	Stadium: Glenisk O'Connor Park; Attendance: 10,073; Referee: James Owens (Wexford)

27 April 2025 Round 2	Antrim	2–12 (18) – (36) 2–30	Kilkenny	Belfast
14:00	J McNaughton 1–9 (0-9f), K Molloy 1–1, C Bohill 0–1, N Elliott 0–1	Report	E Cody 1–13 (1-9f), M Keoghan 1–2, S Donnelly 0–3, C Kenny 0–2, J Molloy 0–2, P Deegan 0–1, J Donnelly 0–1, F Mackessy 0–1 (1f), H Shine 0–1, B Ryan 0–1, T Walsh 0–1, M Butler 0–1, B Drennan 0–1	Stadium: Corrigan Park; Referee: S Hynes (Galway)

==== Round 3 ====
10 May 2025 Round 3	Galway	1–29 (32) – (22) 2–16	Wexford	Galway
15:15	C Mannion 0–17 (0-11f), C Cooney 1–0, B Concannon 0–2, G Lee 0–2, J Fleming 0–2, C Fahy 0–2, T Monaghan 0–2, C Molloy 0–1, S Linnane 0–1	Report	L Chin 0–12 (0-9f, 0–1 ’65), C Dunbar 1–0, C Byrne 1–0, J O’Connor 0–1, K Foley 0–1, C Hearne 0–1, R O’Connor 0–1	Stadium: Pearse Stadium; Referee: Thomas Walsh (Waterford)

10 May 2025 Round 3	Antrim	0–19 (19) – (34) 3–25	Dublin	Belfast
16:30	J McNaughton 0–10 (8f, 1 65); R McCambridge, J McLaughlin 0–2 (1f) each; C Boyd, C McKeown, E Campbell, N Elliott, G Walsh (1f) 0–1 each	Report	S Currie 0–12 (8f, 2 65s); C O'Sullivan 1–3; F Whitely 1–1; R Hayes 1–0; C Crummey 0–3; B Hayes, J Hetherton, C Burke, P Doyle, C McHugh, C Currie 0–1 each	Stadium: Corrigan Park; Referee: Liam Gordon (Galway)

10 May 2025 Round 3	Kilkenny	4–25 (37) – (22) 2–16	Offaly	Kilkenny
18:00	TJ Reid 2–9 (7f), J Donnelly, B Ryan 0–4 each, C Kenny (2f), S Donnelly 0–3 each, M Keoghan, A Mullen 1–0 each, H Shine, F Mackessy 0–1 each	Report	B Duignan 0-8f, O Kelly 2–1, C Mitchell 0–3, D Bourke, D Shirley 0–2 each	Stadium: Nowlan Park; Attendance: 5,225; Referee: Colm McDonald (Antrim)

==== Round 4 ====
17 May 2025 Round 4	Galway	6–27 (45) – (17) 1–14	Antrim	Galway
13:30	Galway: C Cooney 0–11 (0-9f), A Burns 2–2, B Concannon 2–0, T Monaghan 0–6, K Cooney 1–1, D McLoughlin 1–1, C Whelan, R Glennon 0–2 each, D Morrissey, S Linnane 0–1 each	Report	J McLaughlin 0–7 (0-6f), N McGarrell 1–0, G Walsh 0–3 (0-3f), E O’Neill 0–2, N O’Connor, C McKeown 0–1 each	Stadium: Pearse Stadium; Attendance: ~18,000; Referee: Thomas Gleeson (Dublin)

17 May 2025 Round 4	Wexford	2–17 (23) – (20) 1–17	Offaly	Wexford
17:00	Lee Chin 1–8 (6fs, 1 65), Kevin Foley 1–1, Cian Byrne 0–2, Conor Hearne, Cian Molloy, Jack O’Connor, Cathal Dunbar, Rory O’Connor, Conor McDonald 0–1 each	Report	Brian Duignan 1–9 (9fs), Dan Ravenhill 0–3 (2fs), Killian Sampson 0–2, Ross Ravenhill, Daniel Bourke, Donal Shirley 0–1 each	Stadium: Wexford Park; Attendance: 3,722; Referee: Shane Hynes (Galway)

18 May 2025 Round 4	Kilkenny	5–19 (34) – (30) 3–21	Dublin	Kilkenny
15:00	TJ Reid 1–9 (9f), B Ryan 2–3, M Keoghan 1–2, A Mullen 1–1, S Donnelly, K Doyle, J Molloy, L Hogan 0–1 each	Report	S Currie 2–6 (1-4f, 0–1 ‘65), C O’Sullivan 1–5, C Donohoe 0–4, AJ Murphy 0–2, D Power, R McBride, C Crummey, F Whitely 0–1 each	Stadium: Nowlan Park; Attendance: 8,001; Referee: Michael Kennedy (Tipperary)

==== Round 5 ====
25 May 2025 Round 5	Wexford	2–19 (25) – 1–15 (18)	Kilkenny	Wexford
14:00	Wexford: L Chin 1–13 (0-9f), R O’Connor 1–1, J O’Connor, M Dwyer, S Donohoe, C Hearne, C McDonald all 0–1	Report	TJ Reid 1–4 (0-2f, 0–2 ‘65), J Donnelly 0–3, L Connellan 0–2, B Drennan, K Doyle, S Donnelly, A Mullen, R Reid, R Mackessy all 0–1	Stadium: Wexford Park; Attendance: 4,623; Referee: Seán Stack (Dublin)

25 May 2025 Round 5	Dublin	3–15 (24) – (29) 0–29	Galway	Dublin
14:00		Report		Stadium: Parnell Park; Attendance: ~8,200; Referee: Colm Lyons (Cork)

25 May 2025 Round 5	Offaly	3–15 (24) – (19) 1–16	Antrim	Tullamore
14:00		Report		Stadium: Glenisk O'Connor Park; Attendance: ~4,000; Referee: Michael Kennedy (Tipperary)

==== Leinster final ====
8 June 2025
16:00
Leinster Final

Kilkenny	3–22 (31) – (23) 1–20	Galway
	Report

Croke Park
Attendance: 37,503
Referee: Johnny Murphy
Man of the match: Huw Lawlor

=== Munster Senior Hurling Championship ===
==== Group Stage ====
Pos	Team	Pld	W	D	L	SF	SA	Diff	Pts	Qualification
1	Limerick	4	2	1	1	5–101	6–81	+17	5	Advance to Munster Final
2	Cork	4	2	1	1	9–92	7–93	+5	5	Advance to Munster Final
3	Tipperary	4	2	1	1	7–95	9–92	−3	5	Advance to All-Ireland preliminary quarter-finals
4	Clare	4	1	1	2	8–83	8–89	−6	3	
5	Waterford	4	1	0	3	4–88	3–104	−13	2	

==== Round 1 ====
20 April 2025 Round 1	Clare	3–21 (30) – (30) 2–24	Cork	Ennis
14:00	Aidan McCarthy 1–7 (6f); Tony Kelly 0–5 (2f); David Reidy 1–2 (2f); Peter Duggan 1–1; Mark Rodgers (2f), Ian Galvin 0–2 each; David Fitzgerald, Cathal Malone 0–1 each	Report	Patrick Horgan 0–9 (6f, 1’65); Brian Hayes 2–2; Darragh Fitzgibbon, Alan Connolly 0–3 each; Shane Barrett, Tim O’Mahony 0–2 each; Seamus Harnedy, Brian Roche, Declan Dalton (f) 0–1 each	Stadium: Cusack Park; Attendance: 20,778; Referee: Liam Gordon (Galway)

20 April 2025 Round 1	Tipperary	2–23 (29) – (29) 2–23	Limerick	Thurles
16:00	Darragh McCarthy 0–8 (5f), John McGrath 2–1, Jake Morris 0–4, Eoghan Connolly 0–4 (all frees), Craig Morgan, Alan Tynan, Jason Forde, Bryan O’Mara, Séamus Kennedy, Noel McGrath all 0–1.	Report	Shane O’Brien 1–4, Aaron Gillane 0–7 (4f), Adam English 1–2, Diarmaid Byrnes 0–3 (2f), Kyle Hayes 0–2, Barry Nash, Colin Coughlan, Cian Lynch, Tom Morrissey, Gearoid Hegarty all 0–1.	Stadium: Semple Stadium; Attendance: 32,295; Referee: Thomas Walsh (Waterford)

==== Round 2 ====
27 April 2025 Round 2	Waterford	2–23 (29) – (21) 0–21	Clare	Waterford
14:00	Stephen Bennett 2–8 (4fs, 1–0 penalty), Jamie Barron 0–4, Darragh Lyons 0–3, Dessie Hutchinson, Patrick Curran 0–2 each, Michael Kiely, Patrick Fitzgerald, Billy Nolan, Mark Fitzgerald 0–1 each	Report	David Reidy 0–6 (2fs), Ryan Taylor, Peter Duggan (1 sideline) Shane Meehan 0–4 each, Cathal Malone 0–2, Mark Rodgers 0–1	Stadium: Walsh Park; Attendance: 12,078; Referee: Chris Mooney (Dublin)

27 April 2025 Round 2	Cork	4–27 (39) – (24) 0–24	Tipperary	Cork
16:00	Patrick Horgan 1–9 (6fs), Declan Dalton 1–6 (2fs), Séamus Harnedy 0–5, Tim O’Mahony, Alan Connolly 1–0 each, Darragh Fitzgibbon, Brian Hayes, Robbie O’Flynn 0–2 each, Tommy O’Connell 0–1	Report	Jason Forde 0–15 (12fs), Jake Morris 0–3, Willie Connors 0–2, Eoghan Connolly, Craig Morgan, Darragh Stakelum, Andrew Ormond 0–1 each	Stadium: Páirc Uí Chaoimh; Attendance: 42,231; Referee: Johnny Murphy (Limerick)

==== Round 3 ====
3 May 2025 Round 3	Waterford	0–22 (22) – (28) 0–28	Limerick	Waterford
18:00	Stephen Bennett (0–9, 6 frees, 2 65s); B. Nolan (frees), M. Fitzgerald, J. Barron (0–2 each); P. Fitzgerald, J. Prendergast, D Hutchinson, K. Mahony, M. Kiely, Shane Bennett, G. Fives (0–1 each)	Report	A. Gillane (0–9, 6 frees); S O’Brien (0–4); T. Morrissey, A. English, C. Lynch (0–3 each); B. Nash (0–2); D. Byrnes, G. Hegarty, A. O’Connor, C. O’Neill (0–1 each)	Stadium: Walsh Park; Attendance: 12,101; Referee: Colm Lyons (Cork)

10 May 2025 Round 3	Clare	2–21 (27) – (30) 4–18	Tipperary	Ennis
18:00	M Rodgers 1–13 (13f); T Kelly 1–1 (0–1 pen, 1f); S Rynne 0–3; R Taylor 0–2; C Malone, P Duggan 0–1 each	Report	J McGrath 2–3; J Forde 0–8 (6fs, 65); A Ormond 2–1; E Connolly 0–3 (2f); J Morris 0–2; S Kenneally 0–1	Stadium: Cusack Park; Attendance: 20,685; Referee: James Owens (Wexford)

==== Round 4 ====
18 May 2025 Round 4	Tipperary	1–30 (33) – (24) 1–21	Waterford	Thurles
14:10	D McCarthy (0–11, 0–11 frees); J Morris (0–4); J Forde (0–2 sc), E Connolly (0–2 frees), A Ormond (0–3 each); O O’Donoghue (1–1); J McGrath (0–2); S O’Farrell, N McGrath, S Kenneally (0–1 each)	Report	Stephen Bennett (1–9, 0–7 frees); J Barron (0–4); M Kiely (0–2); P Leavey, D Lyons (0–1 sc); K Mahony, D Hutchinson, P Fitzgerald, S Walsh (0–1)	Stadium: Semple Stadium; Attendance: 28,758; Referee: Seán Stack (Dublin)

18 May 2025 Round 4	Limerick	3–26 (35) – (19) 1–16	Cork	Limerick
16:00	A. Gillane (2–7, 1–0 pen, 0–6 frees); A. English (1–2); T. Morrissey (0–5); G. Hegarty (0–3); C. O’Neill, P. Casey (0–2 each); M. Casey, S. O’Brien, C. Lynch, D. Reidy, D. Byrnes (0–1 each)	Report	P. Horgan (1–9, 1–8 frees); S. Harnedy (0–2); M. Coleman, R. Downey, B. Hayes, S. Barrett, B. Roche (0–1 each)	Stadium: Gaelic Grounds; Attendance: 42,477; Referee: Liam Gordon (Galway)

==== Round 5 ====
25 May 2025 Round 5	Cork	2–25 (31) – (25) 1–22	Waterford	Cork
16:00	Patrick Horgan 1–8 (8fs), Brian Hayes 1–1, Shane Barrett, Séamus Harnedy, Alan Connolly 0–3 each, Darragh Fitzgibbon 0–2 (1f), Mark Coleman, Shane Kingston, Cormac O’Brien 0–1 each.	Report	Stephen Bennett 1–7 (6fs, 1 sideline), Seán Walsh, Patrick Fitzgerald 0–3 each, Jack Prendergast, Michael Kiely 0–2 each, Billy Nolan (f), Mark Fitzgerald, Dessie Hutchinson, Jamie Barron, Kieran Bennett 0–1 each.	Stadium: Páirc Uí Chaoimh; Attendance: 42,181; Referee: Johnny Murphy (Limerick)

25 May 2025 Round 5	Limerick	0–24 (24) – (29) 3–20	Clare	Limerick
16:00	Tom Morrissey 0–7 (5fs), Diarmaid Byrnes 0–4 (2fs), Cathal O’Neill 0–3, Seamus Flanagan, Gearoid Hegarty, Peter Casey 0–2 each, Adam English, Barry Nash, Aidan O’Connor, Donnacha Ó Dálaigh 0–1 each.	Report	Mark Rodgers 1–8 (7fs), Ryan Taylor 2–1, Tony Kelly 0–3, Peter Duggan (0–2 s/l), David Reidy, Cathal Malone 0–2 each, Rory Hayes, Shane Meehan 0–1 each.	Stadium: Gaelic Grounds; Attendance: 32,133; Referee: Thomas Walsh (Waterford)

==== Munster final ====
7 June 2025
18:00
Munster final

Limerick	2–27–1–30 (a.e.t.)	Cork
	Report
Penalties
	2–3

TUS Gaelic Grounds, Limerick
Attendance: 43,580
Referee: Thomas Walsh (Waterford) (Note: Walsh suffered an injury and was replaced by James Owens (Wexford).)
Man of the match: Darragh Fitzgibbon (Cork)

== Cup competitions ==
=== Joe McDonagh Cup (Tier 2) ===
==== Group Stage ====
Pos	Team	Pld	W	D	L	SF	SA	Diff	Pts	Qualification
1	Kildare	5	4	0	1	10–112	6–90	+34	8	Advance to Final and All-Ireland Preliminary Quarter-Finals
2	Laois	5	3	1	1	16–127	9–92	+56	7	Advance to Final and All-Ireland Preliminary Quarter-Finals
3	Carlow	5	3	1	1	19–110	7–102	+44	7	
4	Westmeath	5	2	0	3	11–117	14–106	+2	4	
5	Down	5	1	0	4	4–92	17–128	−75	2	
6	Kerry	5	1	0	4	5–88	12–128	−61	2	Relegated to Christy Ring Cup

==== Final ====
8 June 2025 Final	Kildare	2–26 (32) – (22) 1–19	Laois	Dublin
				Venue: Croke Park
				TV: RTE 2

=== Christy Ring Cup (Tier 3) ===
==== Group Stage ====
Pos	Team	Pld	W	D	L	SF	SA	Diff	Pts	Qualification
1	Derry	5	4	0	1	7–122	6–76	+49	8	Advance to Final
2	London (C)	5	3	1	1	14–92	6–85	+31	7	Advance to Final
3	Wicklow	5	3	1	1	8–82	7–89	−4	7	
4	Donegal	5	2	0	3	8–88	7–75	+16	4	
5	Meath	5	2	0	3	8–97	11–100	−12	4	
6	Tyrone	5	0	0	5	5–65	13–121	−80	0	Relegated to Nicky Rackard Cup

==== Final ====
31 May 2025 Final	Derry	1–24 (27) – (30) 1–27	London	Dublin
17:00				Venue: Croke Park
	Pts: Cormac O'Doherty 0–9 (8fs), Thomas Brady 1–1, Eamon Conway 0–4, Christy McNaughton 0–3, Ruairi O Mianain 0–2, Richie Mullan 0–2, Cahal Murray 0–1, Shea Cassidy 0–1, Ryan McGill 0–1.		Pts: David Devine 1–12 (9fs), Enda Egan 0–4 (3fs, 1 65), Dylan Dawson 0–3, Sean Glynn 0–2, Conor O'Carroll 0–2, Paul Kennedy 0–1, Conor McCormack 0–1, Tom Millerick 0–1, Jack Morrissey 0–1.	Referee: Padraig Dunne, Laois; TV: Spórt TG4

London won the Christy Ring Cup.

=== Nicky Rackard Cup (Tier 4) ===
==== Group Stage ====
Pos	Team	Pld	W	D	L	SF	SA	Diff	Pts	Qualification
1	Mayo	5	4	1	0	8–123	5–82	+50	9	Advance to Final
2	Roscommon (C)	5	3	1	1	11–87	1–95	+22	7	Advance to Final
3	Armagh	5	3	0	2	3–77	5–91	−20	6	
4	Sligo	5	2	1	2	11–87	4–102	+6	5	
5	Louth	5	1	0	4	5–92	8–92	−9	2	
6	Fermanagh	5	0	1	4	3–93	18–96	−48	1	Potentially Relegated to Lory Meagher Cup

==== Final ====
31 May 2025 Final	Mayo	1–21 (24) – (25) 3–16	Roscommon	Dublin
13:00				Venue: Croke Park
	Pts: E Delaney 1–3; S Boland 0–6 (3f); L Lavin 0–4; D Huane 0–2; B Douglas, E Collins, K McDermott, R Duffy, J Coyne, S Kenny 0–1 apiece	Report	Pts: S Canning, R Fallon (0-2f), B Mulry 1–2 each; E Fitzgerald 0–3; B McGahan (1f), C Mulry 0–2 each; C Cosgrove (f), F Killion, E Kiernan 0–1 apiece	Referee: Conor Doyle (Tipperary); TV: Spórt TG4

Roscommon won the Nicky Rackard Cup.

=== Lory Meagher Cup (Tier 5) ===
==== Group Stage ====
Pos	Team	Pld	W	D	L	SF	SA	Diff	Pts	Qualification
1	Cavan	5	4	0	1	13–115	9–71	+56	8	Advance to Final
2	Monaghan	5	3	1	1	13–84	8–79	+20	7	Advance to Semi-Final
3	Longford	5	2	2	1	11–86	6–95	+6	6	
4	Leitrim	5	2	1	2	4–69	7–66	−6	5	
5	Lancashire	5	1	0	4	5–83	16–86	−36	2	
6	Warwickshire	5	1	0	4	9–72	9–112	−40	2	

==== Semi-final ====
24 May 2025 Semi-Final	New York	1–29 (32) – (19) 2–13	Monaghan	Mullingar
13:00				Venue: TEG Cusack Park
	Pts: D Mangan 0–10 (6f, e), Barry 0–1, D Moran 0–1, J Glynn 0–2, AJ Willis 1–9, A Loughlin 0–3, C Mullane 0–1, T O'Meara 0–1, G McPartland 0–1	Report	Pts: N Arthur 0–9 (7f), P Malone 0–1, C McHugh 0–1, E Flynn 0–1, K Crawley 0–1, S Slevin 2–0

==== Final ====
31 May 2025 Final	Cavan	2–17 (23) – (29) 4–17	New York	Dublin
15:00				Venue: Croke Park
	Pts: L O’Brien 1–7 (1-0pen, 0-6f); N Kenny 1–1; Cillian Sheanon, J McGuinness 0–2 each; D Mulligan, C Maher, E Óg McAllister, S Keating, R Delaney 0–1 apiece	Report	Pts: D Mangan 1–7 (1-0pen, 0–2 ‘65’, 0–1 f); AJ Willis, D Walsh 1–1 each; T O’Connor 1–0; A Loughlin Stones 0–3; J Glynn 0–2; T O’Meara, C Hammersley, A Organ 0–1 apiece	Referee: K Parke (Antrim); TV: Spórt TG4

New York won the Lory Meagher Cup. As a result, Fermanagh retained their status in the Nicky Rackard Cup for 2026.

== All-Ireland Senior Hurling Championship ==
=== Bracket ===
Preliminary Quarter-finals; 14 June
Kildare	0–13
Dublin	3–25
Laois	0–18
Tipperary	3–32

Quarter-Finals; 21/22 June
Limerick	0–28
Dublin	2–24
Galway	2–17
Tipperary	1–28

Semi-Finals; 5/6 July
Cork	7–26
Dublin	2–21
Kilkenny	0–30
Tipperary	4–20

All-Ireland final 20 July
Cork	1–18
Tipperary	3–27

== Preliminary quarter-finals ==
14 June 2025 Preliminary quarter-final	Kildare	0–13 (13) – (34) 3–25	Dublin	Newbridge
16:00		(HT: 0-05 – 2–14)		Venue: St Conleth's Park
		Report		Attendance: 11,500

14 June 2025 Preliminary quarter-final	Laois	0–18 (18) – (41) 3–32	Tipperary	Portlaoise
13:45		(HT: 0–12 – 1–17)		Venue: O'Moore Park
		Report		Attendance: 6,640; TV: GAA+

== Quarter-finals ==
21 June 2025 Quarter-final	Galway	2–17 (23) – (31) 1–28	Tipperary	Limerick
18:15		(HT: 0–11 – 0–16)		Venue: TUS Gaelic Grounds
		Report		Attendance: 15,404; TV: RTÉ2

21 June 2025 Quarter-final	Limerick	0–28 (28) – (30) 2–24	Dublin	Dublin
16:00		(HT: 0–12 – 0–15)		Venue: Croke Park
		Report		Attendance: 36,546; TV: RTÉ2

== Semi-finals ==
5 July 2025 Semi-final	Cork	7–26 (47) – (27) 2–21	Dublin	Dublin
17:00		(HT: 4–13 – 1–12)		Venue: Croke Park
	Gls: Alan Connolly 3, Brian Hayes 2, Tim O'Mahony 2 Pts: Patrick Horgan 8 (6fs), Declan Dalton 5 (2fs), Darragh Fitzgibbon 3, Shane Kingston 2, Alan Connolly 2, Brian Hayes 1, Tim O'Mahony 1, Diarmuid Healy 1, Ciaran Joyce 1, Conor Lehane 1, Jack O’Connor 1	Report	Gls: Cian O'Sullivan 2 Pts: Sean Currie 7fs, Cian O'Sullivan 5, Fergal Whitely 3, Conor Burke 3, Brian Hayes 1, John Hetherton 1, Donal Burke 1	Referee: Johnny Murphy (Limerick); Attendance: 82,300; TV: RTÉ 2 BBC Two NI

6 July 2025 Semi-final	Kilkenny	0–30 (30) – (32) 4–20 (Note: The score of the second All-Ireland SHC semi-final was originally reported as 4–21 to 0–30 due to a wide shot being incorrectly awarded as a point to Tipperary by the Croke Park scoreboard and TV graphics. Neither umpire nor referee awarded a point.)	Tipperary	Dublin
16:00		(HT: 0–16 – 3–11)		Venue: Croke Park
	Pts: TJ Reid 11 (8fs, 1 65), Martin Keoghan 6, Jordan Molloy 4, Cian Kenny 2, Adrian Mullen 2, Billy Ryan 2, Eoin Cody 2, John Donnelly 1	Report	Gls: Jason Forde 1, John McGrath 1, Darragh McCarthy 1, Oisín O'Donoghue 1 Pts: Jason Forde 5 (4fs), Jake Morris 4, Eoghan Connolly 3, Conor Stakelum 3, John McGrath 2, Darragh McCarthy 2fs, Sam O'Farrell 1	Referee: James Owens (Wexford); Attendance: 60,738; TV: RTÉ 2 BBC Two NI

== Final ==
RTÉ 2
BBC

20 July 2025
15:35 IST (UTC+01:00)
Final

Report

Cork	1–18 (21) – (36) 3–27	Tipperary
(HT: 1–16 – 0–13)
Gls: Shane Barrett 1 Pts: Shane Barrett 4, Patrick Horgan 4 (3f), Diarmuid Healy 3, Darragh Fitzgibbon 2, Brian Hayes 1, Alan Connolly 1, Declan Dalton 1f, Niall O'Leary 1, Seamus Harnedy 1		Gls: John McGrath 2, Darragh McCarthy 1(pen); Pts: Darragh McCarthy 13 (9fs), John McGrath 2, Jake Morris 2, Jason Forde 2, Andrew Ormond 2, Eoghan Connolly 1, Robert Doyle 1, Willie Connors 1, Conor Stakelum 1, Rhys Shelly 1, Noel McGrath 1

Croke Park, Dublin
Referee: Liam Gordon (Galway)
Attendance: 82,331

== Incidents ==
On 6 July, the GAA released a statement after the scoreboard at Croke Park misled Kilkenny and Tipperary towards the end of the All-Ireland SHC semi-final. Kilkenny believed a goal was necessary and spent the conclusion of the game trying to score one. The GAA later launched an investigation into the incident.

Taoiseach Micheál Martin was questioned at the Oireachtas Committee on Finance over whether he had returned early from his visit to Japan to watch the other semi-final between Cork and Dublin. When asked about "having "booked the flight home through Toronto at a cost to the taxpayer", he denied this was why he had returned four hours early and not flown through Dubai as originally expected.

== Stadia and locations ==
Locations of the 2025 All-Ireland SHC teams.
Red: Munster SHC; Green: Leinster SHC; Blue: Joe McDonagh Cup.

County	Location	Province	Stadium	Capacity
Antrim	Belfast	Ulster	Corrigan Park	3,700
Carlow	Carlow	Leinster	Dr Cullen Park	11,000
Clare	Ennis	Munster	Cusack Park	19,000
Cork	Cork	Munster	Páirc Uí Chaoimh	45,000
Down	Rubane	Ulster	McKenna Park	5,000
Dublin	Dublin	Leinster	Croke Park (neutral)	82,300
Dublin	Donnycarney	Leinster	Parnell Park (official home venue)	8,500
Galway	Galway	Connacht	Pearse Stadium	26,197
Kerry	Tralee	Munster	Austin Stack Park	12,000
Kildare	Newbridge	Leinster	St Conleth's Park	15,000
Kilkenny	Kilkenny	Leinster	Nowlan Park	27,000
Laois	Portlaoise	Leinster	O'Moore Park	22,000
Limerick	Limerick	Munster	Gaelic Grounds	44,023
Offaly	Tullamore	Leinster	O'Connor Park	18,000
Tipperary	Thurles	Munster	Semple Stadium	45,690
Waterford	Waterford	Munster	Walsh Park	11,046
Westmeath	Mullingar	Leinster	Cusack Park	11,500
Wexford	Wexford	Leinster	Chadwicks Wexford Park	18,000

== Statistics ==
=== Top scorers ===
==== Overall ====
One theme of the 2025 championship was the ongoing individual battle for the top championship scorer of all time between Patrick Horgan and T. J. Reid. At the end of the season, Horgan retired from the game, leaving as the current all time top scorer having brought his career tally to 779, compared to Reid's tally of 758. Reid continues to play.

Rank	Player	County team	Tally	Total	Matches	Average
1	Seán Currie	Dublin	4–68	80	8	10
2	Cathal Mannion	Galway	2–67	73	6	12.16
3	Lee Chin	Wexford	3–56	65	5	13.00
4	Patrick Horgan	Cork	3–54	63	7	9
5	Jason Forde	Tipperary	3–46	55	8	6.87
6	Darragh McCarthy	Tipperary	2–46	52	6	8.66
6	T. J. Reid	Kilkenny	5–37	52	5	10.40
8	Aaron Gillane	Limerick	2–41	47	5	9.4
9	Stephen Bennett	Waterford	4–33	45	4	11.25
10	Brian Duignan	Offaly	2–37	43	5	8.60
11	James McNaughton	Antrim	2–35	41	4	10.25

==== From Play ====
Rank	Player	County team	Tally	Total	Matches	Average
1	John McGrath	Tipperary	7–16	37	8	4.62
1	Cian O'Sullivan	Dublin	5–22	37	8	4.62
3	Martin Keoghan	Kilkenny	6–15	33	6	5.5
4	Jason Forde	Tipperary	3–16	25	8	3.12
5	Cathal Mannion	Galway	1–21	24	6	4
5	Brian Hayes	Cork	5–09	24	7	3.42
5	Jake Morris	Tipperary	0–24	24	7	3.42
8	Alan Connolly	Cork	4–10	22	7	3.14
8	Adam English	Limerick	2–16	22	6	3.66
10	Andrew Ormond	Tipperary	2–15	21	7	3
10	Billy Ryan	Kilkenny	2–15	21	7	3
10	Seán Currie	Dublin	1–18	21	8	2.62

==== In a single game ====
Rank	Player	County team	Tally	Total	Opposition
1	Cathal Mannion	Galway	0–17	17	Wexford
2	Darragh McCarthy	Tipperary	1–13	16	Cork
2	Lee Chin	Wexford	0–16	16	Antrim
2	Eoin Cody	Kilkenny	1–13	16	Antrim
2	Mark Rodgers	Clare	1–13	16	Tipperary

=== Scoring events ===
- Widest winning margin: 39 points
  - Down 1–12 – 6–36 Laois (Joe McDonagh Cup Round 2)
- Most goals in a match: 11
  - Westmeath 4–22 – 7–23 Carlow (Joe McDonagh Cup Round 4)
- Most points in a match: 52
  - Limerick 0–28 – 2–24 Dublin (All-Ireland Quarter-Final)
- Most goals by one team in a match: 7
  - Fermanagh 2–18 – 7–20 Sligo (Nicky Rackard Cup Round 3)
  - Westmeath 4–22 – 7–23 Carlow (Joe McDonagh Cup Round 4)
  - Cork 7–26 – 2–21 Dublin (All-Ireland Semi-Final)
- Most points by one team in a match: 36
  - Down 1–12 – 6–36 Laois (Joe McDonagh Cup Round 2)
- Highest aggregate score: 78 points
  - Westmeath 4–22 – 7–23 Carlow (Joe McDonagh Cup Round 4)
- Lowest aggregate score: 27 points
  - Donegal 1–10 – 1–11 Wicklow (Christy Ring Cup Round 2)
- Hat-trick Heros:
  - Chris Nolan (Carlow) 3–1 v Down (Joe McDonagh Cup Round 1)
  - James Duggan (Laois) 5–2 v Kerry (Joe McDonagh Cup Round 3)
  - Martin Kavanagh (Carlow) 3–12 v Westmeath (Joe McDonagh Cup Round 4)
  - Josh Connolly McGee (Donegal) 3–2 v Tyrone (Christy Ring Cup Round 3)
  - Andrew Kilcullen (Sligo) 4–7 vs Fermanagh (Nicky Rackard Cup Round 3)
  - Seán Canning (Roscommon) 3–2 vs Louth (Nicky Rackard Cup Round 5)
  - Alan Connolly (Cork) 3–2 vs Dublin (All-Ireland Semi-Final)

== Miscellaneous ==
- Clare, the All-Ireland holders, failed to qualify for the All-Ireland series. This hadn't happened since 2014, when Clare, also as holders, were knocked out in the qualifiers. The same happened to Clare in 1996, when they lost their only game. The last non-Clare All-Ireland holders to fail to reach the All-Ireland series were Kilkenny in 1994.
- Kildare played in the All-Ireland Senior Hurling Championship for the first time since 2004. It is their first time playing in the knockout stage since 1989.
- Limerick failed to reach the semi-final stage for the first time since 2017.
- The Big Three all reached the semi-finals for the first time since 2014.
- Kilkenny failed to win the All-Ireland for the tenth year in a row, the longest wait for a title in their history ever since they won their first All-Ireland SHC in 1904, surpassing the nine-year losing streaks of 1923–31 and 1948–56.
- The 8th All-Ireland win a row for a Munster county. This is close to the record, which is 11-in-a-row (1890 to 1900).
- The 7–26 (47 points) scored by Cork in the semi-final is the second- or third-highest amount scored by any team in an All-Ireland semi-final; the other two are:
  - Wexford, who scored 12–17 (53 points) against Antrim in the 1954 semi-final
  - Galway, who scored about 3–44 (53 points) against Antrim in the 1900 semi-final. However, this scoreline is only an estimate; Galway led by 25 points at half-time and reporters present did not keep an accurate tally of score.
- Cork were the first team to score 7 goals in an All-Ireland semi-final since 1986, when the previous team to do so was also Cork.

== Live television coverage ==
RTÉ, the national broadcaster in Ireland, provided the majority of the live television coverage of the hurling championship.

For the first year new streaming service GAA+ which replaced GAAGO also broadcast matches in Ireland exclusively on its pay streaming service.

BBC Two Northern Ireland showed the All-Ireland semi-finals and final.

== Awards ==
Sunday Game Team of the Year

The Sunday Game team of the year was picked 20 July on the night of the final. The panel consisting of Jackie Tyrrell, Brendan Cummins, Dónal Óg Cusack, Joe Canning, Henry Shefflin, and Ursula Jacob also chose Jake Morris as the Sunday game player of the year.

- 1. Rhys Shelly (Tipperary)
- 2. Robert Doyle (Tipperary)
- 3. Huw Lawlor (Kilkenny)
- 4. Seán O’Donoghue (Cork)
- 5. Eoghan Connolly (Tipperary)
- 6. Ronan Maher (Tipperary)
- 7. Ciarán Joyce (Cork)
- 8. Darragh Fitzgibbon (Cork)
- 9. Cathal Mannion (Galway)
- 10. Jake Morris (Tipperary)
- 11. Andrew Ormond (Tipperary)
- 12. Cian O’Sullivan (Dublin)
- 13. Martin Keoghan (Kilkenny)
- 14. John McGrath (Tipperary)
- 15. Brian Hayes (Cork)

All Star Team of the Year

On 6 November, the All-Star winners were announced. The awards ceremony was held at the RDS on 7 November.

Pos.	Player	Team	Appearances
GK	Rhys Shelly	Tipperary	1
RCB	Robert Doyle	Tipperary	1
FB	Huw Lawlor	Kilkenny	3
LCB	Seán O'Donoghue	Cork	1
RWB	Eoghan Connolly	Tipperary	1
CB	Ronan Maher	Tipperary	3
LWB	Ciarán Joyce	Cork	1
MD	Cathal Mannion	Galway	2
MD	Darragh Fitzgibbon	Cork	3
RWF	Jake Morris	Tipperary	1
CF	Andrew Ormond	Tipperary	1
LWF	Cian O'Sullivan	Dublin	1
RCF	Martin Keoghan	Kilkenny	1
FF	John McGrath^{HOTY}	Tipperary	2
LCF	Brian Hayes	Cork	1

== Attendances ==
The following table lists all 2025 All-Ireland Senior Hurling Championship matches with an attendance of at least 30,000. Attendance figures are taken from the match reports on this page.

#	Date	Match	Venue	Attendance	Note
1	20 July 2025	Tipperary vs Cork	Croke Park	82,331	Final
2	5 July 2025	Cork vs Dublin	Croke Park	82,300	Semi-final
3	6 July 2025	Kilkenny vs Tipperary	Croke Park	60,738	Semi-final
4	7 June 2025	Limerick vs Cork	Gaelic Grounds	43,580	Munster final
5	18 May 2025	Limerick vs Cork	Gaelic Grounds	42,477	Round 4
6	4 May 2025	Cork vs Tipperary	Páirc Uí Chaoimh	42,231	Round 2
7	8 June 2025	Kilkenny vs Galway	Croke Park	37,503	Leinster final
8	1 June 2025	Limerick vs Dublin	Croke Park	36,546	Quarter-final
9	20 April 2025	Tipperary vs Limerick	Semple Stadium	32,295	Round 1
10	25 May 2025	Limerick vs Clare	Gaelic Grounds	32,133	Round 5

== See also ==
- 2025 All-Ireland Senior Football Championship
- 2025 All-Ireland Minor Hurling Championship
- 2025 Leinster Senior Hurling Championship
- 2025 Munster Senior Hurling Championship
- 2025 Joe McDonagh Cup (Tier 2)
- 2025 Christy Ring Cup (Tier 3)
- 2025 Nicky Rackard Cup (Tier 4)
- 2025 Lory Meagher Cup (Tier 5)
- 2025 All-Ireland Senior Camogie Championship
