= 2025 Nicky Rackard Cup =

Hurling competition in Ireland

- Corn Niocláis Mhic Riocaird

Tournament details
- Level: 4
- Year: 2025
- Trophy: Nicky Rackard Cup
- Dates: 12 April - 31 May 2025
- Teams: 6

Winners
- Champions: Roscommon (3rd win)
- Manager: Kevin Sammon
- Captain: Conor Cosgrove
- Qualify for: Nicky Rackard Cup Final

Runners-up
- Runners-up: Mayo
- Manager: Ray Larkin
- Captain: David Kenny

Promotion/Relegation
- Promoted team(s): Roscommon

Other
- Matches played: 16
- Total scored: 45-595 (45.63 per game)
- Top Scorer: Andrew Kilcullen (6-43)

The 2025 Nicky Rackard Cup was the twenty-first edition of the Nicky Rackard Cup since its establishment by the Gaelic Athletic Association in 2005 and is the fourth-tier of Hurling for senior county teams (the All-Ireland Senior Hurling Championship is the first-tier trophy). It is contested by six GAA county teams ranked 24–29 in the 2025 All-Ireland Senior Hurling Championship. The competition ran from 12 April to 1 June 2025.

Donegal, winner of the 2024 final, were promoted to the Christy Ring Cup, replaced by Sligo who were relegated back to this competition. Fermanagh were promoted from the Lory Meagher Cup.

The top 2 teams from the round robin stage will play off in the final to decide the winner. The Nicky Rackard Cup Final will be played on 31 May 2025 at Croke Park in Dublin. Roscommon defeated Mayo by 3-16 to 1-24.

== Team changes ==
=== To Championship ===
Relegated from the Christy Ring Cup

- Sligo

Promoted from the Lory Meagher Cup

- Fermanagh

=== From Championship ===
Promoted to the Christy Ring Cup

- Donegal

Relegated to the Lory Meagher Cup

- Monaghan

== Format ==
=== Cup format ===
Initially each of the six teams play the other five teams in single round-robin matches. The top two teams after the round robin games compete in the Nicky Rackard Cup Final.

==== Promotion ====
The Nicky Rackard Cup champions are automatically promoted to the following year's Christy Ring Cup and are replaced by the bottom-placed team in the Christy Ring Cup.

==== Relegation ====
The bottom-placed team in the Nicky Rackard Cup are automatically relegated to the following year's Lory Meagher Cup and are replaced by the Lory Meagher Cup champions. However, if New York are the Lory Meagher Cup champions, no team will be relegated from the Nicky Rackard Cup.

=== Teams by province ===
The participating teams, listed by province, with numbers in parentheses indicating final positions in the 2025 National Hurling League before the championship were:

Connacht (3)

- Mayo (23)
- Roscommon (25)
- Sligo (28)

Leinster (1)

- Louth (29)

Munster (0)

- None participated

Ulster (2)

- Armagh (26)
- Fermanagh (30)

== Teams ==
=== General Information ===
County	Last Cup Title	Last Provincial Title	Last All-Ireland Title	Position in 2024 Championship	Appearance
Armagh	2012	—	—	4th	16th
Fermanagh	—	—	—	Champions (Lory Meagher Cup)	8th
Louth	—	—	—	5th	17th
Mayo	2021	1909	—	Runners-up	6th
Roscommon	2015	1913	—	3rd	12th
Sligo	2019	—	—	6th (Christy Ring Cup)	12th

=== Personnel and kits ===
County	Manager	Captain(s)	Sponsor
Armagh	Karl McKeegan	Barry Shortt	Simplyfruit
Fermanagh	Joe Baldwin	Rory Porteous and Tom Keenan	Belter Tech
Louth	Trevor Hilliard	Conor Clancy	STATSports
Mayo	Ray Larkin	David Kenny	Intersport Elverys
Roscommon	Kevin Sammon	Conor Cosgrove	Ballymore Group
Sligo	Stephen Sheil	Kevin O'Kennedy	Clayton Hotels

== Group stage ==
=== Table ===
Pos	Team	Pld	W	D	L	SF	SA	Diff	Pts	Qualification
1	Mayo	5	4	1	0	8-123	5-82	+50	9	Advance to Final
2	Roscommon	5	3	1	1	11-87	1-95	+22	7	Advance to Final
3	Armagh	5	3	0	2	3-77	5-91	-20	6	
4	Sligo	5	2	1	2	11-87	4-102	+6	5	
5	Louth	5	1	0	4	5-92	8-92	-9	2	
6	Fermanagh	5	0	1	4	3-93	18-96	-48	1	Potentially relegated to Lory Meagher Cup

=== Round 1 ===
12 April 2025 Round 1	Mayo	1-21 (24) - (17) 1-14	Roscommon	Castlebar
15:00	Cormac Phillips 1-4 (0-2f, 0-1 '65); Shane Boland 0-7 (0-5f); Liam Lavin 0-3; Eoin Delaney, Danny Huane, Ryan Duffy 0-2; Jason Coyne 0-1	Report	Robbie Fallon 0-3 (0-3f); Ben McGahon 1-0; Jack Dowling, Brendan Mulry, Cathal Kenny 0-2 each; Eoin Kiernan, Cian Murray, Finn Killion, Conor Cosgrove, Eoin Fitzgerald 0-1 each	Stadium: Hastings Insurance MacHale Park

12 April 2025 Round 1	Sligo	0-20 (20) - (15) 0-15	Louth	Sligo
15:00	Andrew Kilcullen (0-10, 4f, 1'65), Paul O’Brien (0-4), Thomas Cawley (0-3), James Weir (0-1), Tony O’Kelly-Lynch (0-1), Eoin Comerford (0-1)	Report	Darren Geoghegan (0-8, 7f), Leon Fox (0-4), Conor Murphy (0-1), Paddy Lynch (0-1), Peter Fortune (0-1)	Stadium: Markievicz Park

13 April 2025 Round 1	Fermanagh	0-15 (15) - (16) 1-13	Armagh	Enniskillen
14:00	Luca McCusker 0-5 (0-4f); John Duffy 0-4 (0-2f); Jimmy Tormey 0-3; Francis McBrien, Caolon Duffy, Ben Corrigan 0-1 each	Report	Danny Magee (0-2f, 0-2 '65), Barry Shortt (0-2f) 0-4 each; Connor Renaghan 1-0; Sheá Gaffney 0-2; Charlie McArdle, Kane Laverty, Peter McKearney 0-1 each	Stadium: Brewster Park

=== Round 2 ===
19 April 2025 Round 2	Armagh	0-11 (11) - (32) 1-29	Mayo	Armagh
14:00	Pauric McNaughton 0-3 (0-2f); Sheá Gaffney, Danny MaGee (0-1f) 0-2 each; Stephen Keenan, Peter McKearney, Charlie McArdle, Odhrán Curry 0-1 each	Report	Shane Boland 0-7 (4f), Liam Lavin 0-6, Eoin Delaney 0-4, Simon Thomas 1-1, Cormac Phillips, Eoghan Collins, Bobby Douglas (1f, 1 65’) and Ryan Duffy 0-2 each, Evan Heraty, Brendan Sheridan and Daniel Huane 0-1 each	Stadium: BOX-IT Athletic Grounds

19 April 2025 Round 2	Sligo	0-17 (17) - (17) 1-14	Roscommon	Sligo
14:00	Andrew Kilcullen 0-9 (7f); Paul 0'Brien, Darragh Flynn 0-2 each; Paul O'Leary, Gerard O'Kelly-Lynch, Thomas Cawley and Eddie O'Donoghue 0-1 each	Report	Conor Cosgrove 0-5 (4f), Jack Donnelly 1-0, Finn Killion 0-3f, Cathal Kenny and Conor Mulry 0-2 each, Robbie Fallon (f) and Keelan Ryan 0-1 each	Stadium: Markievicz Park

20 April 2025 Round 2	Louth	3-20 (29) - (15) 0-15	Fermanagh	Dowdallshill
14:00	Darren Geoghegan (1-5, 4f), Leon Fox (1-4), Conor Murphy (0-4), Seán Conneely (1-0), Paddy Lynch (0-2, 1f), Seán Flynn (0-2), Aaron McGuinness (0-1), Brian Corcoran (0-1), James Costello (0-1)	Report	Danaan McKeogh (0-5, 5f), Seán Corrigan (0-4), Luca McCusker (0-2), Ben Corrigan (0-2), Adam O'Shea (0-1), Eoin Cleary (0-1)	Stadium: Páirc Naomh Bríd

=== Round 3 ===
26 April 2025 Round 3	Mayo	2-25 (31) - (24) 2-18	Louth	Castlebar
15:00	Cormac Phillips 0-06, Shane Boland 0-05, Kieran McDermott 1-02, Eoin Delaney 0-04, Liam Lavin 0-04, Sioman Thomas 1-00, Daniel Huane 0-02, Ciaran Finn 0-01, Ryan Duffy 0-01	Report	Darren Geoghegan 0-9 (0-6f); Leon Fox 2-3 (1-0p); Paddy Lynch (0-1sl), Seán Flynn 0-2 each; Peter Fortune, Mark Gahan 0-1 each	Stadium: Hastings Insurance MacHale Park

26 April 2025 Round 3	Fermanagh	2-18 (24) - (41) 7-20	Sligo	Enniskillen
15:00	L McCusker 1-5; S Corrigan 1-4; D Teague 0-4,3f; D McKeogh 0-3f; E Cleary 0-1; C Duffy 0-1	Report	A Kilcullen 4-7; C Griffin 2-2; F O’Kelly/Lynch 1-0; E O’Donoghue 0-3; P O’Leary 0-3; F Connolly 0-2; T O’Kelly/Lynch 0-1; D Flynn 0-1; T Cawley 0-1	Stadium: Brewster Park; Referee: P Dunne (Laois)

27 April 2025 Round 3	Roscommon	1-15 (18) - (15) 0-15	Armagh	Roscommon
12:30	S Canning 1-0, R Fallon, C Mulry 0-3 each, J Dowling, C Murray, F Killion 0-2 each, C Cosgrove (1f), M Hussey, B McGahon (1f) 0-1 each	Report	S Harvey (6f, 1’65) 0-8, S Gaffney, C McArdle 0-2 each, P McNaughton, D Fox, D Magee 0-1 each	Stadium: King & Moffatt Dr Hyde Park; Referee: A McAleer (Donegal)

=== Round 4 ===
10 May 2025 Round 4	Armagh	2-15 (21) - (19) 0-19	Louth	Armagh
12:00	P McKearney 1-2, S Keenen 1-0, S Harvey 0-7 (4f, 1 ’65), C Duffy 0-2 C Renaghan, J O’Connor, C McArdle, B Shortt 0-1 each	Report	D Geoghegan 0-8f, L Fox 0-4 M Gahan 0-4, C Murphy 0-2, Goss Kieran 0-1	Stadium: BOX-IT Athletic Grounds; Referee: Kevin Parke (Cavan)

10 May 2025 Round 4	Mayo	1-32 (35) - (20) 1-17	Sligo	Castlebar
14:00	Shane Boland 0-9 (0-6f); Liam Lavin 0-5 (0-1f); John Heraty 1-1; Ryan Duffy 0-4; Eoin Delaney 0-3; Cormac Phillips (0-1 '65), Bobby Douglas(0-2f), Daniel Huane, Jason Coyne 0-2 each; Eoghan Collins, Michael Farrell 0-1 each	Report	Andrew Kilcullen 0-8 (0-8f); Robert O'Kelly Lynch 1-0; Conor Griffin, Eddie O'Donoghue, Paul O'Leary 0-2 each; Rory McHugh, Gerard O'Kelly Lynch, Darragh Flynn 0-1 each	Stadium: Hastings Insurance MacHale Park

11 May 2025 Round 4	Roscommon	4-27 (39) - (22) 0-22	Fermanagh	Roscommon
14:00	R Fallon (3f) 2-4, B Mulry 0-8, F Killion 1-2, S Canning 1-1, C Murray 0-4, E Fitzgerald 0-3, C Cosgrove (1f, 1 ’65), C Mulry 0-2 each, J Dowling 0-1	Report	S Corrigan 0-6, L McCusker (2f), C Duffy 0-4 each, E Cleary 0-3, T Duane, J Tormey, A Flanagan, F McBrien, C McManus 0-1 each	Stadium: King & Moffatt Dr Hyde Park; Referee: James Clarke (Cavan)

=== Round 5 ===
17 May 2025 Round 5	Fermanagh	1-22 (25) - (25) 3-16	Mayo	Enniskillen
14:00	J Duffy 1-6 (0-3f, 0-2 65'), S Corrigan 0-7, J Tormey 0-2, T Keenan 0-2, B Corrigan 0-2, A McShea 0-1, U O'Reilly 0-1, O Johnston 0-1	Report	E Delaney 2-2 (0-1f), C Scahill 1-1, S Kenny 0-5 (2f, 1 65'), C Phillips 0-3 (2f), L Lavin 0-2, J Burke 0-1, R Duffy 0-1	Stadium: Brewster Park; Referee: Ciaran McCloskey (Antrim)

17 May 2025 Round 5	Sligo	3-13 (22) - (23) 0-23	Armagh	Tubbercurry
14:00	A Kilcullen 2-9 (2 pen 8f), D Flynn 1-0, E O'Donoghue 0-2, G O'Kelly-Lynch, T O'Kelly-Lynch 0-1 each	Report	S Harvey 0-9 (8f), T Galvin 0-6, B Shortt, C Renaghan 0-2 each, S Keenan, C McArdle, P McNaughton, C Duffy 0-1 each	Stadium: Kilcoyne Memorial Park; Referee: J Judge (Mayo)

17 May 2025 Round 5	Louth	0-20 (20) - (29) 4-17	Roscommon	Dowdallshill
14:00	D Geoghegan 0-9 (4f, 1 ’65); M Gahan 0-3; R McKeown 0-2; A McGuinness, C Murphy, T McCreesh, P Lynch, P Lynch, Fox 0-1 each	Report	S Canning 3-2; B Mulry 1-1; McGahon 0-3 (3f); C Cosgrove (1f, 1 '65), C Mulry, A Donnelly 0-2 each; E Fitzgerald, F Killion, J Dowling, R Fellon, L Óg Coyle 0-1 each	Stadium: Páirc Naomh Bríd

== Knockout stage ==
=== Final ===
31 May 2025 Final	Mayo	1-21 (24) – (25) 3-16	Roscommon	Dublin
13:00				Venue: Croke Park
	Pts: E Delaney 1-3; S Boland 0-6 (3f); L Lavin 0-4; D Huane 0-2; B Douglas, E Collins, K McDermott, R Duffy, J Coyne, S Kenny 0-1 apiece	Report	Pts: S Canning, R Fallon (0-2f), B Mulry 1-2 each; E Fitzgerald 0-3; B McGahan (1f), C Mulry 0-2 each; C Cosgrove (f), F Killion, E Kiernan 0-1 apiece	Referee: Conor Doyle (Tipperary); TV: Spórt TG4

Roscommon wins the Nicky Rackard Cup.

== Stadia and locations ==
Locations of the 2025 Nicky Rackard counties.

County	Location	Province	Stadium(s)	Capacity
Neutral	Dublin	Leinster	Croke Park	82,300
Armagh	Armagh	Ulster	Athletic Grounds	18,500
Fermanagh	Enniskillen	Ulster	Brewster Park	20,000
Louth	Drogheda	Leinster	Drogheda Park	3,500
Mayo	Castlebar	Connacht	MacHale Park	25,369
Roscommon	Roscommon	Connacht	Dr Hyde Park	25,000
Sligo	Sligo	Connacht	Markievicz Park	18,558

== Statistics ==
=== Top scorers ===
Overall

Rank	Player	County	Tally	Total	Matches	Average
1	Andrew Kilcullen	Sligo	6-43	61	5	12.20
2	Darren Geoghegan	Louth	1-39	42	5	8.40
3	Shane Boland	Mayo	0-34	34	5	6.80
4	Sheá Harvey	Armagh	0-28	28	5	5.60
5	Eoin Delaney	Mayo	3-18	27	6	4.50
6	Leon Fox	Louth	3-16	25	5	5.00
7	Seán Corrigan	Fermanagh	1-21	24	4	6.00
7	Liam Lavin	Mayo	0-24	24	6	4.00
9	Seán Canning	Roscommon	6-05	23	4	5.75
9	Robbie Fallon	Roscommon	3-14	23	6	3.83

In a single game

Rank	Player	County	Tally	Total	Opposition
1	Andrew Kilcullen	Sligo	4-07	19	Fermanagh
2	Andrew Kilcullen	Sligo	2-09	15	Armagh
3	Seán Canning	Roscommon	3-02	11	Louth
4	Andrew Kilcullen	Sligo	0-10	10	Louth
5	Andrew Kilcullen	Sligo	0-09	9	Roscommon
5	Darren Geoghegan	Louth	0-09	9	Mayo
5	Leon Fox	Louth	2-03	9	Mayo
5	Shane Boland	Mayo	0-09	9	Sligo
5	John Duffy	Fermanagh	1-06	9	Mayo
5	Sheá Harvey	Armagh	0-09	9	Sligo
5	Darren Geoghegan	Louth	0-09	9	Roscommon

=== Scoring events ===
- Widest winning margin: 21 points
  - Armagh 0-11 - 1-29 Mayo (Round 2)
- Most goals in a match: 9
  - Fermanagh 2-18 - 7-20 Sligo (Round 3)
- Most points in a match: 49
  - Mayo 1-32 - 1-17 Sligo (Round 4)
  - Roscommon 4-27 - 0-22 Fermanagh (Round 4)
- Most goals by one team in a match: 7
  - Fermanagh 2-18 - 7-20 Sligo (Round 3)
- Most points by one team in a match: 32
  - Mayo 1-32 - 1-17 Sligo (Round 4)
- Highest aggregate score: 65 points
  - Fermanagh 2-18 - 7-20 Sligo (Round 3)
- Lowest aggregate score: 31 points
  - Fermanagh 0-15 - 1-13 Armagh (Round 1)
- Hat-trick Heros:
  - Andrew Kilcullen (Sligo) 4-07 vs Fermanagh (Round 3)
  - Seán Canning (Roscommon) 3-02 vs Louth (Round 5)

== See also ==
- 2025 All-Ireland Senior Hurling Championship
- 2025 Leinster Senior Hurling Championship
- 2025 Munster Senior Hurling Championship
- 2025 Joe McDonagh Cup (Tier 2)
- 2025 Christy Ring Cup (Tier 3)
- 2025 Lory Meagher Cup (Tier 5)
