= 2025 Christy Ring Cup =

Hurling competition

- Corn Chriostóir Uí Rinn

Tournament details
- Level: 3
- Year: 2025
- Trophy: Christy Ring Cup
- Dates: 12 April - 31 May 2025
- Teams: 6
- Defending champions: London

Winners
- Champions: London (2nd win)
- Manager: Neil Rogers
- Captain: Sean Glynn
- Qualify for: Christy Ring Cup Final

Runners-up
- Runners-up: Derry
- Manager: Johnny McGarvey
- Captain: Cormac O'Doherty

Promotion/Relegation
- Promoted team(s): London
- Relegated team(s): Tyrone

Other
- Matches played: 16
- Total scored: 50-546 (46.40 per game)
- Top Scorer: Jack Regan (1-45)

The 2025 Christy Ring Cup was the twenty-first edition of the Christy Ring Cup since its establishment by the Gaelic Athletic Association in 2005 and was the third-tier of Hurling for senior county teams (the All-Ireland Senior Hurling Championship is the first-tier trophy). It was contested by six GAA county teams ranked 18–23 in the 2025 All-Ireland Senior Hurling Championship. The competition ran from 12 April to 1 June 2025.

Kildare, winner of the 2024 final, were promoted to the Joe McDonagh Cup, replaced by Meath who were relegated back to this competition. Donegal were promoted from the Nicky Rackard Cup.

The top 2 teams from the round robin stage played off in the final to decide the winner. The Christy Ring Cup final was played on 1 June 2025 at Croke Park in Dublin. London defeated Derry by 1–27 to 1–24.

The bottom team was relegated to the Nicky Rackard Cup.

== Team changes ==
=== To Championship ===
Relegated from the Joe McDonagh Cup

- Meath

Promoted from the Nicky Rackard Cup

- Donegal

=== From Championship ===
Promoted to the Joe McDonagh Cup

- Kildare

Relegated to the Nicky Rackard Cup

- Sligo

== Format ==
=== Cup format ===
Initially each of the six teams played the other five teams in single round-robin matches. The top two teams after the round robin games competed in the Christy Ring Cup Final.

==== Promotion ====
The winner of the Christy Ring Cup was automatically promoted to the following year's Joe McDonagh Cup and replaced by the bottom-placed team in the Joe McDonagh Cup.

==== Relegation ====
The bottom-placed team in the Christy Ring Cup was automatically relegated to the following year's Nicky Rackard Cup and replaced by the Nicky Rackard Cup champions.

=== Teams by province ===
The participating teams, listed by province, with numbers in parentheses indicating final positions in the 2025 National Hurling League before the championship were:

Britain (1)

- London (22)

Connacht (0)

- None participated

Leinster (2)

- Meath (18)
- Wicklow (24)

Munster (0)

- None participated

Ulster (3)

- Derry (19)
- Donegal (20)
- Tyrone (21)

== Teams ==
=== General information ===
County team	Last Cup title	Last Provincial title	Last All-Ireland title	Position in 2024 Championship	Appearance
Derry	—	2001	—	2nd	19th
Donegal	—	1932	—	Champions (Nicky Rackard Cup)	2nd
London	2012	—	1901	3rd	13th
Meath	2023	—	—	6th (Joe McDonagh Cup)	15th
Tyrone	—	—	—	4th	3rd
Wicklow	—	—	—	5h	20th

=== Personnel and kits ===
County	Manager	Captain(s)	Sponsor
Derry	Johnny McGarvey	Cormac O'Doherty	Errigal Group
Donegal	Mickey McCann	Conor Gartland	Circet
London	Neil Rogers	Sean Glynn	Clayton Hotels
Meath	Johnny Greville	Simon Ennis and Nicky Potterton	Glenveagh Homes
Tyrone	Stephen McGarry	Oran McKee	McAleer & Rushe
Wicklow	Jonathan O'Neill	Davy Maloney	Yuasa Battery

== Group Stage ==
=== Table ===
Pos	Team	Pld	W	D	L	SF	SA	Diff	Pts	Qualification
1	Derry	5	4	0	1	7-122	6-76	+49	8	Advance to Final
2	London	5	3	1	1	14-92	6-85	+31	7	Advance to Final
3	Wicklow	5	3	1	1	8-82	7-89	-4	7	
4	Donegal	5	2	0	3	8-88	7-75	+16	4	
5	Meath	5	2	0	3	8-97	11-100	-12	4	
6	Tyrone (R)	5	0	0	5	5-65	13-121	-80	0	Relegated to Nicky Rackard Cup

=== Round 1 ===
12 April 2025 Round 1	Wicklow	1-24 (27) - (22) 2-16	Tyrone	Aughrim
13:00	Pádraig Doyle 1-7 (0-5f), Pádraig Doran 0-5 (0-1 '65), Jack Doyle, Ronan McMahon, Seánie Germaine 0-3 each, Luke Evans, Dan Redmond, Warren Kavanagh 0-1 each	Report	Aidan Kelly 1-7 (0-7f), Sean Duffin 0-5 (0-2f), Kiefer Morgan 1-0, Tiernan Morgan, Michael Little, Aidan Woods, Fionn Devlin 0-1 each	Stadium: Echelon Park

12 April 2025 Round 1	Meath	0-21 (21) - (33) 5-18	London	Trim
13:00	Jack Regan (0-11 six frees, two 65's), Lorcan Byrne (0-3), James Toher (0-2), Kyle Donnelly, James Cooke, Kris Gorman, Sean Quigley, James Kelly (0-1 each)	Report	Jack Morrissey (2-5), David Devine (0-7 four frees), Paul Kennedy (2-0), Conor O'Carroll (1-1), Enda Egan (0-2 one free), Sean Glynn (0-2), Dylan Dawson (0-1)	Stadium: St Loman's Park

12 April 2025 Round 1	Derry	1-21 (24) - (20) 1-17	Donegal	Derry
15:00	Christy McNaughton 1-9, 5f, 2 65; John Mullan 0-6; G Bradley 0-3; Thomas Brady, Cahal Murray and Michael McGrath 0-1	Report	Gerry Gilmore 0-5, 4f; Declan Coulter and Sean McVeigh 0-3; Luke White 1-1, 1-0 pen, 0-1f; Liam Óg McKinney 0-2 and Josh Cronolly McGee 0-2; Conor Gartland 0-1	Stadium: Celtic Park

=== Round 2 ===
19 April 2025 Round 2	Donegal	1-10 (13) - (14) 1-11	Wicklow	Letterkenny
14:00	Gerry Gilmore 0-4, 1f; Luke White 1-0 penalty; Declan Coulter and Ruairi Campbell 0-2; Liam Og McKinney and Ronan McDermott 0-1	Report	Pádraig Doyle 1-5, 2f; Padraig Doran 0-2, 2f; Marc Lennon 0-2; Luke Evans and Jack Phelan 0-1	Stadium: O'Donnell Park

19 April 2025 Round 2	Meath	2-29 (35) - (21) 2-15	Tyrone	Trim
15:00	Jack Regan (0-13 0-10 frees), James Kelly (0-4), Damien Healy (1-1), Darren O'Higgins (1-0), Daire Shine, Cian Rogers, Mikey Cole (0-2 each), Darragh Kelly, James Toher, Lorcan Byrne, Nicky Potterton, Kris Gorman (0-1 each)	Report	Sean Duffin (1-8 one penalty, five frees, one 65), Rory Weir (1-1), Ciaran Magill (0-3), Aidan Kelly (0-2 one free), Fionn Devlin (0-1)	Stadium: St Loman's Park

20 April 2025 Round 2	London	1-18 (21) - (25) 2-19	Derry	Ruislip
12:30	David Devine 0-10 (0-8f, 0-2 '65), Sean Glynn 1-1, Paul Kennedy, Conor O'Carroll 0-2 each, Rory Lodge, Enda Egan (0-1f), Jack Morrissey (0-1f) 0-1 each	Report	Cormac O'Doherty 2-3, Christy McNaughton 0-6 (0-4f), Decky Foley 0-5, Eamon Conway 0-4, Ruairi Ó Mianáin 0-1	Stadium: McGovern Park

=== Round 3 ===
26 May 2025 Round 3	Tyrone	0-10 (10) - (33) 5-18	Donegal	Carrickmore
12:30	S Duffin 0-6 (5f), R Weir 0-3, L Devlin, M Little (f) 0-1 each	Report	J Connolly McGee 3-2, D Coulter 1-4, L White 1-1 (1-0 pen), G Gilmore 0-5 (2f), L McKinney 0-2, R McDermott, B McIntyre, S McVeigh, R Hilferty 0-1 each	Stadium: Páirc Colmcille; Referee: C O’Regan (Cork)

26 April 2025 Round 3	Wicklow	2-17 (23) - (23) 2-17	London	Aughrim
13:00	L. Evans 2-1; P. Dorian (3 65) 0-3; R McMahon, J. Phelan 0-2 each; J. Doyle, M. Lennon, C. McNally (1f), P. Doyle, J. Toomey S. Germaine, T. Collins, S. O'Dowd and W. Kavanagh 0-1 each	Report	D. Devine (1f, 1 65), 1-4; S. Glynn 0-4; J. Morrissey 1-0; E. Egan (2f), P. Kennedy, D Dawson, D. Leahy 0-2 each C. McCormack 0-1	Stadium: Echelon Park

26 April 2025 Round 3	Derry	1-22 (25) - (26) 3-17	Meath	Derry
13:00	C O’Doherty 0-12 (9f, 1 65); Shéa Cassidy 1-1; E Conway 0-3; R Ó Mianáin; M McGrath; R McGill; D Foley; C Murray and C McNaughton 0-1 each	Report	J Regan 0-7 (6f); M Cole 2-0; N Potterton 0-3; D Healy 1-0); J Toher; L Byrne 0-2 each; K Gorman; C Rogers and S Quigley 0-1 each	Stadium: Celtic Park; Referee: J Clarke (Cavan)

=== Round 4 ===
10 May 2025 Round 4	Donegal	1-15 (18) - (25) 2-19	London	Letterkenny
12:30	Gerard Gilmore (0-6,4f), Danny Cullen (1-2), Liam McKinney (0-2), Conor O’Grady (0-1), Declan Coulter (0-1), Conor Gartland (0-1), Peter Kelly (0-1), Sean Ward (0-1)	Report	Jack Morrisey (1-5, pen,f), Dylan Dawson (0-5), Sean Glynn (0-4,2f), Conor O’Carroll (1-0), Adam Cunney (0-1), Owen Sheil (0-1), Rory Lodge (0-1), David Devine (0-1), Donnachadha Leahy (0-1)	Stadium: O'Donnell Park; Referee: Ciarán McCloskey (Antrim)

10 May 2025 Round 4	Tyrone	0-11 (11) - (33) 1-30	Derry	Eoghan Ruadh, Dungannon
13:00	S Duffin 0-4 (3f); L Devlin 0-3; A Woods 0-2; F Corry, T Morgan 0-1 each	Report	R McGill 1-1; C O’Doherty 0-8 (4f); S Cassidy 0-5; C O’Kane 0-4; J Mullan 0-3; M McGrath, J Friel, D Cartin 0-2 each; R Ó Mianáin, E Cassidy, R Mullan 0-1 each	Stadium: Donaghmore Road; Referee: Peter Owens (Down)

10 May 2025 Round 4	Wicklow	3-17 (26) - (16) 0-16	Meath	Aughrim
14:00	Padraig Doyle (1-7, 6f), John Toomey (2-0), Marc Lennon (0-2), Ronan McMahon (0-2), Seanie Germaine (0-2), Pádraig Doran (0-1, 1 65), Jack Phelan (0-1), Jack Doyle (0-1), Davey Maloney (0-1)	Report	Jack Regan (0-7, 2f, 3 65), Nicky Potterton (0-3), Dean Healy (0-2), Joey Cole (0-1), Kris Gorman (0-1), Lorcan Byrne (0-1), James Murray (0-1)	Stadium: Echelon Park; Referee: Pádraig Dunne (Laois)

=== Round 5 ===
17 May 2025 Round 5	Derry	2-30 (36) - (16) 1-13	Wicklow	Derry
13:30	C O'Doherty 1-13 (9f, 2 '65'); E Conway 0-4; R Ó Mianáin 0-3; A Duffin 1-0; R Mullan, S Cassidy, J Mullan 0-2 each; C McNaughton, J Friel, D Cartin, T Brady 0-1 each	Report	P Doyle 1-5 (5f, 1 '65'); P Doran 0-3 (4f); S Germaine 0-2; J Phelan, L Evans, R McMahon 0-1 each	Stadium: Celtic Park; Referee: M Farrell (Roscommon)

17 May 2025 Round 5	Meath	3-14 (23) - (28) 0-28	Donegal	Trim
13:30	J Regan 1-7 (0-6f,1-0p); C Rogers & N Potterton 1-0 each; P Hanrahan 0-2; J Kelly, S Quigley; D Healy, M Burke & J Toher 0-1 each	Report	L McKinney 0-16 (0-13f); P Kelly, C Gartland, & K Kealy 0-2 each; C O’Grady, B MacIntyre, S Ward, J McGee/Cronolly, R Forde & J Kealy 0-1	Stadium: St Loman's Park; Referee: Conor Doyle (Tipperary)

17 May 2025 Round 5	London	4-20 (32) - (16) 1-13	Tyrone	Ruislip
13:30	C O'Carroll 2-3, S Glynn 1-4, D Dawson 1-2, 2f, D Devine 0-5, E Egan 0-3, 3f, O Shiel, D Reale, C McCormack 0-1	Report		Stadium: McGovern Park; Referee: Kevin Parke (Antrim)

== Knockout stage ==
=== Final ===
31 May 2025 Final	Derry	1-24 – 1-27	London	Dublin
17:00				Venue: Croke Park
	Pts: Cormac O'Doherty 0-9 (8fs), Thomas Brady 1-1, Eamon Conway 0-4, Christy McNaughton 0-3, Ruairi O Mianain 0-2, Richie Mullan 0-2, Cahal Murray 0-1, Shea Cassidy 0-1, Ryan McGill 0-1.		Pts: David Devine 1-12 (9fs), Enda Egan 0-4 (3fs, 1 65), Dylan Dawson 0-3, Sean Glynn 0-2, Conor O'Carroll 0-2, Paul Kennedy 0-1, Conor McCormack 0-1, Tom Millerick 0-1, Jack Morrissey 0-1.	Referee: Padraig Dunne, Laois; TV: Spórt TG4

London win the Christy Ring Cup.

== Stadia and locations ==
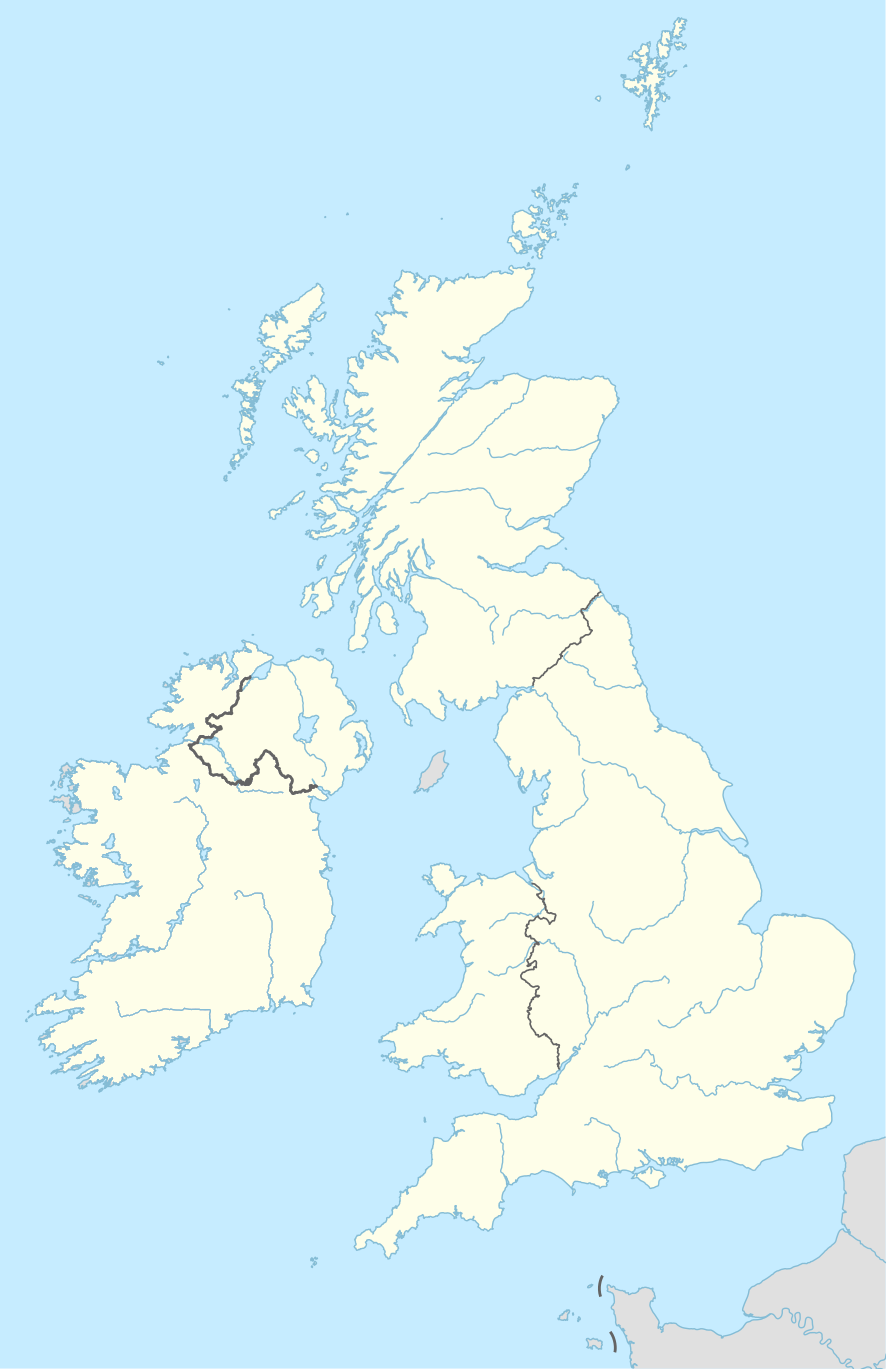
Locations of the 2025 Christy Ring Cup counties.

County	Location	Province	Stadium	Capacity
Neutral	Dublin	Leinster	Croke Park	82,300
Derry	Derry	Ulster	Celtic Park	22,000
Donegal	Letterkenny	Ulster	O'Donnell Park	8,200
London	South Ruislip	Britain	McGovern Park	3,000
Meath	Trim	Leinster	St. Loman's Park	
Tyrone	Carrickmore	Ulster	Páirc Colmcille	
Wicklow	Aughrim	Leinster	Echelon Park Aughrim	7,000

== Statistics ==
=== Top scorers ===
Overall

Rank	Player	County	Tally	Total	Matches	Average
1	Jack Regan	Meath	1-45	48	5	9.60
2	Cormac O'Doherty	Derry	3-36	45	5	9.00
3	Pádraig Doyle	Wicklow	4-25	37	5	7.40
4	David Devine	London	1-27	30	5	6.00
5	Seán Duffin	Tyrone	1-23	26	4	6.50
6	Jack Morrissey	London	4-11	23	4	5.67
6	Liam McKinney	Donegal	0-23	23	5	4.60
8	Gerry Gilmore	Donegal	0-20	20	4	5.00
8	Christy McNaughton	Derry	1-17	20	4	5.00
10	Conor O'Carroll	London	4-06	18	4	4.50

In a single game

Rank	Player	County	Tally	Total	Opposition
1	Cormac O'Doherty	Derry	1-13	16	Wicklow
1	Liam McKinney	Donegal	0-16	16	Meath
3	Jack Regan	Meath	0-13	13	Tyrone
4	Christy McNaughton	Derry	1-09	12	Donegal
4	Cormac O'Doherty	Derry	0-12	12	Meath
6	Jack Morrissey	London	2-05	11	Meath
6	Jack Regan	Meath	0-11	11	London
6	Seán Duffin	Tyrone	1-08	11	Meath
6	Josh Connolly McGee	Donegal	3-02	11	Tyrone
10	Pádraig Doyle	Wicklow	1-07	10	Tyrone
10	Aidan Kelly	Tyrone	1-07	10	Wicklow
10	David Devine	London	0-10	10	Derry
10	Pádraig Doyle	Wicklow	1-07	10	Meath
10	Jack Regan	Meath	1-07	10	Donegal

=== Scoring events ===
- Widest winning margin: 23 points
  - Tyrone 0-10 - 5-18 Donegal (Round 3)
- Most goals in a match: 5
  - Meath 0-21 - 5-18 London (Round 1)
  - Tyrone 0-10 - 5-18 Donegal (Round 3)
  - London 4-20 - 1-13 Tyrone (Round 5)
- Most points in a match: 44
  - Meath 2-29 - 2-15 Tyrone (Round 2)
- Most goals by one team in a match: 5
  - Meath 0-21 - 5-18 London (Round 1)
  - Tyrone 0-10 - 5-18 Donegal (Round 3)
- Most points by one team in a match: 30
  - Tyrone 0-11 - 1-30 Derry (Round 4)
  - Derry 2-30 - 1-13 Wicklow (Round 5)
- Highest aggregate score: 56 points
  - Meath 2-29 - 2-15 Tyrone (Round 2)
- Lowest aggregate score: 27 points
  - Donegal 1-10 - 1-11 Wicklow (Round 2)
- Hat-trick Heros:
  - Josh Connolly McGee (Donegal) 3-02 v Tyrone (Round 3)

== See also ==
- 2025 All-Ireland Senior Hurling Championship
- 2025 Leinster Senior Hurling Championship
- 2025 Munster Senior Hurling Championship
- 2025 Joe McDonagh Cup (Tier 2)
- 2025 Nicky Rackard Cup (Tier 4)
- 2025 Lory Meagher Cup (Tier 5)
