= 2025 Munster Senior Hurling Championship =

Hurling Championship

Munster Senior Hurling Championship
Tournament details
- Province: Munster
- Year: 2025
- Trophy: The Mick Mackey Cup
- Date: 19 April - 7 June 2025
- Teams: 5
- Defending champions: Limerick

Winners
- Champions: Cork (55th win)
- Manager: Pat Ryan
- Captain: Rob Downey
- Qualify for: Munster SHC Final; All-Ireland SHC

Runners-up
- Runners-up: Limerick
- Manager: John Kiely
- Captain: Cian Lynch

Other
- Matches played: 11
- Total scored: 33-459 (55.80 per game)
- Top Scorer: Stephen Bennett (3-26)
- Website: https://munster.gaa.ie/

The 2025 Munster Senior Hurling Championship was the 138th edition of the Munster Senior Hurling Championship since its establishment by the Munster Council in 1888 and is the highest-tier of Hurling for senior county teams in Munster. It was contested by five Munster GAA county teams ranked 1–5 in the 2024 All-Ireland Senior Hurling Championship.

The competition began on 19 April with the final on 7 June.

The game was level at full time and after extra time (Cork 1-30 Limerick 2-27) and history was made with the first-ever penalty shootout in the Munster Senior Hurling Championship, with Cork prevailing 3-2 on penalties.

== Format ==
=== Group stage (10 matches) ===
Each team plays each other once. The 1st and 2nd placed teams advance to the Munster final and the 3rd placed team advances to the All-Ireland preliminary quarter-finals. All other teams are eliminated from the championship.

=== Final (1 match) ===
The top 2 teams in the group stage contest this game. The Munster champions advance to the All-Ireland semi-finals and the Munster runners-up advance to the All-Ireland quarter-finals.

Winner: Cork

== Teams ==
=== General information ===
Five counties contested the 2025 Munster Senior Hurling Championship:

County	Last Championship Title	Last All-Ireland Title	Position in 2024 Championship
Clare	1998	2024	Runners-up
Cork	2018	2005	3rd
Limerick	2024	2023	Champions
Tipperary	2016	2019	5th
Waterford	2010	1959	4th

=== Personnel and kits ===
County	Manager	Captain(s)	Sponsor
Clare	Brian Lohan	Tony Kelly	Pat O'Donnell
Cork	Pat Ryan	Rob Downey	Sports Direct
Limerick	John Kiely	Cian Lynch	JP McManus
Tipperary	Liam Cahill	Ronan Maher	Fiserv
Waterford	Peter Queally	Dessie Hutchinson	Suir Engineering

== Group stage ==
=== Table ===
Pos	Team	Pld	W	D	L	SF	SA	Diff	Pts	Qualification
1	Limerick	4	2	1	1	5-101	6-81	+17	5	Advance to Munster Final
2	Cork	4	2	1	1	9-92	7-93	+5	5	Advance to Munster Final
3	Tipperary	4	2	1	1	7-95	9-92	–3	5	Advance to All-Ireland preliminary quarter-finals
4	Clare (E)	4	1	1	2	8-83	8-89	–6	3	
5	Waterford (E)	4	1	0	3	4-88	3-104	–13	2	

- (E) eliminated from All-Ireland championship

=== Fixtures ===
==== Round 1 ====
20 April 2025 Round 1	Clare	3-21 (30) - (30) 2-24	Cork	Ennis
14:00	Aidan McCarthy 1-7 (6f); Tony Kelly 0-5 (2f); David Reidy 1-2 (2f); Peter Duggan 1-1; Mark Rodgers (2f), Ian Galvin 0-2 each; David Fitzgerald, Cathal Malone 0-1 each	Report	Patrick Horgan 0-9 (6f, 1’65); Brian Hayes 2-2; Darragh Fitzgibbon, Alan Connolly 0-3 each; Shane Barrett, Tim O’Mahony 0-2 each; Seamus Harnedy, Brian Roche, Declan Dalton (f) 0-1 each	Stadium: Cusack Park; Attendance: 20,778; Referee: Liam Gordon (Galway)

20 April 2025 Round 1	Tipperary	2-23 (29) - (29) 2-23	Limerick	Thurles
16:00	Darragh McCarthy 0-8 (5f), John McGrath 2-1, Jake Morris 0-4, Eoghan Connolly 0-4 (all frees), Craig Morgan, Alan Tynan, Jason Forde, Bryan O’Mara, Séamus Kennedy, Noel McGrath all 0-1.	Report	Shane O’Brien 1-4, Aaron Gillane 0-7 (4f), Adam English 1-2, Diarmaid Byrnes 0-3 (2f), Kyle Hayes 0-2, Barry Nash, Colin Coughlan, Cian Lynch, Tom Morrissey, Gearoid Hegarty all 0-1.	Stadium: Semple Stadium; Attendance: 32,295; Referee: Thomas Walsh (Waterford)

==== Round 2 ====
27 April 2025 Round 2	Waterford	2-23 (29) - (21) 0-21	Clare	Waterford
14:00	Stephen Bennett 2-8 (4fs, 1-0 penalty), Jamie Barron 0-4, Darragh Lyons 0-3, Dessie Hutchinson, Patrick Curran 0-2 each, Michael Kiely, Patrick Fitzgerald, Billy Nolan, Mark Fitzgerald 0-1 each	Report	David Reidy 0-6 (2fs), Ryan Taylor, Peter Duggan (1 sideline) Shane Meehan 0-4 each, Cathal Malone 0-2, Mark Rodgers 0-1	Stadium: Walsh Park; Attendance: 12,078; Referee: Chris Mooney (Dublin)

27 April 2025 Round 2	Cork	4-27 (39) - (24) 0-24	Tipperary	Cork
16:00	Patrick Horgan 1-9 (6fs), Declan Dalton 1-6 (2fs), Séamus Harnedy 0-5, Tim O’Mahony, Alan Connolly 1-0 each, Darragh Fitzgibbon, Brian Hayes, Robbie O’Flynn 0-2 each, Tommy O’Connell 0-1	Report	Jason Forde 0-15 (12fs), Jake Morris 0-3, Willie Connors 0-2, Eoghan Connolly, Craig Morgan, Darragh Stakelum, Andrew Ormond 0-1 each	Stadium: Páirc Uí Chaoimh; Attendance: 42,231; Referee: Johnny Murphy (Limerick)

==== Round 3 ====
3 May 2025 Round 3	Waterford	0-22 (22) - (28) 0-28	Limerick	Waterford
18:00	Stephen Bennett (0-9, 6 frees, 2 65s); B. Nolan (frees), M. Fitzgerald, J. Barron (0-2 each); P. Fitzgerald, J. Prendergast, D Hutchinson, K. Mahony, M. Kiely, Shane Bennett, G. Fives (0-1 each)	Report	A. Gillane (0-9, 6 frees); S O’Brien (0-4); T. Morrissey, A. English, C. Lynch (0-3 each); B. Nash (0-2); D. Byrnes, G. Hegarty, A. O’Connor, C. O’Neill (0-1 each)	Stadium: Walsh Park; Attendance: 12,101; Referee: Colm Lyons (Cork)

10 May 2025 Round 3	Clare	2-21 (27) - (30) 4-18	Tipperary	Ennis
18:00	M Rodgers 1-13 (13f); T Kelly 1-1 (0-1 pen, 1f); S Rynne 0-3; R Taylor 0-2; C Malone, P Duggan 0-1 each	Report	J McGrath 2-3; J Forde 0-8 (6fs, 65); A Ormond 2-1; E Connolly 0-3 (2f); J Morris 0-2; S Kenneally 0-1	Stadium: Cusack Park; Attendance: 20,685; Referee: James Owens (Wexford)

==== Round 4 ====
18 May 2025 Round 4	Tipperary	1-30 (33) - (24) 1-21	Waterford	Thurles
14:10	D McCarthy (0-11, 0-11 frees); J Morris (0-4); J Forde (0-2 sc), E Connolly (0-2 frees), A Ormond (0-3 each); O O’Donoghue (1-1); J McGrath (0-2); S O’Farrell, N McGrath, S Kenneally (0-1 each)	Report	Stephen Bennett (1-9, 0-7 frees); J Barron (0-4); M Kiely (0-2); P Leavey, D Lyons (0-1 sc); K Mahony, D Hutchinson, P Fitzgerald, S Walsh (0-1)	Stadium: Semple Stadium; Attendance: 28,758; Referee: Seán Stack (Dublin)

18 May 2025 Round 4	Limerick	3-26 (35) - (19) 1-16	Cork	Limerick
16:00	A. Gillane (2-7, 1-0 pen, 0-6 frees); A. English (1-2); T. Morrissey (0-5); G. Hegarty (0-3); C. O’Neill, P. Casey (0-2 each); M. Casey, S. O’Brien, C. Lynch, D. Reidy, D. Byrnes (0-1 each)	Report	P. Horgan (1-9, 1-8 frees); S. Harnedy (0-2); M. Coleman, R. Downey, B. Hayes, S. Barrett, B. Roche (0-1 each)	Stadium: Gaelic Grounds; Attendance: 42,477; Referee: Liam Gordon (Galway)

==== Round 5 ====
25 May 2025 Round 5	Cork	2-25 (31) - (25) 1-22	Waterford	Cork
16:00	Patrick Horgan 1-8 (8fs), Brian Hayes 1-1, Shane Barrett, Séamus Harnedy, Alan Connolly 0-3 each, Darragh Fitzgibbon 0-2 (1f), Mark Coleman, Shane Kingston, Cormac O’Brien 0-1 each.	Report	Stephen Bennett 1-7 (6fs, 1 sideline), Seán Walsh, Patrick Fitzgerald 0-3 each, Jack Prendergast, Michael Kiely 0-2 each, Billy Nolan (f), Mark Fitzgerald, Dessie Hutchinson, Jamie Barron, Kieran Bennett 0-1 each.	Stadium: Páirc Uí Chaoimh; Attendance: 42,181; Referee: Johnny Murphy (Limerick)

25 May 2025 Round 5	Limerick	0-24 (24) - (29) 3-20	Clare	Limerick
16:00	Tom Morrissey 0-7 (5fs), Diarmaid Byrnes 0-4 (2fs), Cathal O’Neill 0-3, Seamus Flanagan, Gearoid Hegarty, Peter Casey 0-2 each, Adam English, Barry Nash, Aidan O’Connor, Donnacha Ó Dálaigh 0-1 each.	Report	Mark Rodgers 1-8 (7fs), Ryan Taylor 2-1, Tony Kelly 0-3, Peter Duggan (0-2 s/l), David Reidy, Cathal Malone 0-2 each, Rory Hayes, Shane Meehan 0-1 each.	Stadium: Gaelic Grounds; Attendance: 32,133; Referee: Thomas Walsh (Waterford)

== Munster Final ==
7 June 2025
18:00
Munster Final

Limerick	2-27 (33)–(33) 1-30 (a.e.t.)	Cork
	Report
Penalties
	2–3

TUS Gaelic Grounds, Limerick
Attendance: 43,580
Referee: Thomas Walsh (Waterford)
James Owens (Wexford)
Man of the match: Darragh Fitzgibbon (Cork)

== Stadia and Locations ==
Locations of the 2025 Munster SHC teams

County	Location	Province	Stadium	Capacity
Clare	Ennis	Munster	Cusack Park	21,000
Cork	Cork	Munster	Páirc Uí Chaoimh	45,000
Limerick	Limerick	Munster	Gaelic Grounds	44,023
Tipperary	Thurles	Munster	Semple Stadium	45,690
Waterford	Waterford	Munster	Walsh Park	12,100

== Attendance ==
Attendances
Matches	11
Total attendance	329,297
Average attendance	29,936
Highest attendance	43,580; Limerick 2-27 (33) - (33) 1-30 Cork; 7 June 2025

== Championship Statistics ==
=== Top Scorers ===
==== Top Scorer Overall ====
Rank	Player	County	Tally	Total	Matches	Average
1	Stephen Bennett	Waterford	4-33	45	4	11.25
2	Patrick Horgan	Cork	3-35	44	4	11.00
3	Mark Rodgers	Clare	2-24	30	4	7.50
4	Aaron Gillane	Limerick	2-23	29	3	9.67
5	Jason Forde	Tipperary	0-27	27	4	6.75
6	Darragh McCarthy	Tipperary	0-19	19	3	6.33
7	John McGrath	Tipperary	4-06	18	4	4.50
8	Tom Morrissey	Limerick	0-16	16	4	4.00
9	Brian Hayes	Cork	3-06	15	4	3.75
10	Adam English	Limerick	2-08	14	4	3.50

==== In A Single Game ====
Rank	Player	County	Tally	Total	Opposition
1	Mark Rodgers	Clare	1-13	16	Tipperary
2	Jason Forde	Tipperary	0-15	15	Cork
3	Stephen Bennett	Waterford	2-08	14	Clare
4	Aaron Gillane	Limerick	2-07	13	Cork
5	Patrick Horgan	Cork	1-09	12	Tipperary
5	Stephen Bennett	Waterford	1-09	12	Tipperary
5	Patrick Horgan	Cork	1-09	12	Limerick
8	Darragh McCarthy	Tipperary	0-11	11	Waterford
8	Mark Rodgers	Clare	1-08	11	Limerick
8	Patrick Horgan	Cork	1-08	11	Waterford

=== Scoring events ===
- Widest winning margin: 16 points
  - Limerick 3-26 - 1-16 Cork (Round 4)
- Most goals in a match: 6
  - Clare 2-21 - 4-18 Tipperary (Round 3)
- Most points in a match: 51
  - Cork 4-27 - 0-24 Tipperary (Round 2)
  - Tipperary 1-30 - 1-21 Waterford (Round 4)
- Most goals by one team in a match: 4
  - Cork 4-27 - 0-24 Tipperary (Round 2)
  - Clare 2-21 - 4-18 Tipperary (Round 3)
- Most points by one team in a match: 30
  - Tipperary 1-30 - 1-21 Waterford (Round 4)
- Highest aggregate score: 66 points
  - Limerick 2-27 - 1-30 Cork (Final)
- Lowest aggregate score: 50 points
  - Waterford 2-23 - 0-21 Clare (Round 2)
  - Waterford 0-22 - 0-28 Limerick (Round 3)

== See also ==
- 2025 All-Ireland Senior Hurling Championship
- 2025 Leinster Senior Hurling Championship
- 2025 Joe McDonagh Cup (Tier 2)
- 2025 Christy Ring Cup (Tier 3)
- 2025 Nicky Rackard Cup (Tier 4)
- 2025 Lory Meagher Cup (Tier 5)
