= 2025–26 All-Ireland Junior Club Football Championship =

Football competition

- Dates: 26 October 2025 – 11 January 2026
- Teams: 33
- Sponsor: Allied Irish Bank
- Champions: Ballymacelligott (1st title); Daire Keane (captain); Ian Blake (manager)
- Runners-up: Clogher Éire Óg; Conor Shields (captain); Steven McKenna (manager)

Tournament statistics
- Matches played: 33
- Goals scored: 102 (3.09 per match)
- Points scored: 802 (24.3 per match)
- Top scorer(s): Ciarán Bogue (7-24)

Provincial Champions
- Munster: Ballymacelligott
- Leinster: Grangenolvin
- Ulster: Clogher Éire Óg
- Connacht: Kiltimagh

The 2025–26 All-Ireland Junior Club Football Championship was the 24th staging of the All-Ireland Junior Club Football Championship since its establishment by the Gaelic Athletic Association for the 2001–02 season. The championship ran from October 2025 to 11 January 2026.

The All-Ireland final was played at Croke Park in Dublin on 11 January 2026, between Ballymacelligott of Kerry and Clogher Éire Óg of Tyrone, in what was a first championship meeting between the teams. Ballymacelligott won the match by 1–16 to 0–13 and became the 12th team from Kerry to win the title.

Clogher Éire Óg's Ciarán Bogue was the championship's top scorer with 7-24.

== Connacht Junior Club Football Championship ==
The draw for the Connacht Club Championship took place on 18 December 2024.

=== Connacht quarter-final ===
9 November 2025 Quarter-final	St Croan's (Roscommon)	2-12 - 1-07	Cloonacool (Sligo)	King & Moffatt Dr Hyde Park
	K Muldoon (1-1), E Collins (0-3), A Brogan (0-3, two frees), F Kelly (1-0), A Conroy (0-2), A Collins (0-1), K Lambert (0-1), K Smyth (0-1).	Report	H Marren (1-3, pen, 3 frees), M Clifford (0-2), E Carty (0-1); F Moran (0-1).

=== Connacht semi-finals ===
16 November 2025 Semi-final	Aughavas (Leitrim)	1-10 - 1-09	Cárna–Caiseal (Galway)	Seán O'Heslin Memorial Park
	D Shortt (0-7,3f), D Charles (1-1); J McBrien (0-1); E McNamara (0-1).	Report	D O Cualáin (1-4, 2F); J Ó Conaire (0-1); M Ó Cualáin (0-1); M Breathnach (0-1).

16 November 2025 Semi-final	Kiltimagh (Mayo)	1-14 - 2-11; Penalties: 3-2	St Croan's (Roscommon)	Ballyforan Grounds
	F Burke 1-3, P Kelly 1-1, T Keegan 0-2, O Mulderrig 0-2, J McNicholas 0-2, B Gallagher 0-1.	Report	K Muldoon 0-5, C Pacey 1-0, A Brogan 0-3, R Thompson 0-2, G Connaughton 0-1, R Hanley 0-1, A Conroy 0-1, A Collins 0-1.

=== Connacht final ===
29 November 2025 Final	Aughavas (Leitrim)	0-08 - 0-16	Kiltimagh (Mayo)	Páirc Seán Mac Diarmada
	J O’Brien 0-4, 2tp; D Shortt 0-2,2f; A Shortt 0-1,1f; E McNamara 0-1.	Report	T Keegan 0-5; P Kelly 0-3,1tp; C Mallee 0-2; F Burke 0-2; J McNicholas 0-1, 45; J Henry 0-1, E Lavin 0-1.

== Leinster Junior Club Football Championship ==
Details about the Leinster Club Championship draw.

=== Leinster first round ===
1 November 2025 First round	Oliver Plunketts (Louth)	1-15 - 4-08	Shillelagh–Coolboy (Wicklow)	Integral GAA Grounds
	C Brady 1-5, K Nolan 0-6, A Lambe 0-2, S Keeley 0-1, J Byrne 0-1.	Report	C Byrne 1-3, E Cullen 1-3, B Rossiter 1-1, B Behan 1-0, PJ Mulhall 0-1.

1 November 2025 First round	St Brigid's Killashee (Longford)	2-15 - 2-06	Barrowhouse (Laois)	Glennon Brothers Pearse Park
	D Farrell 2-10 (1-0 pen, 1 two-pointer, 0-4fs), N McCormack and M Farrell (0-1f), 0-2 each, J Casey 0-1.	Report	L Day 0-3 (1 two-pointer), J Baldwin and A Baldwin 1-0 each, K Dunne, O Kelleher and B Malone 0-1 each.

1 November 2025 First round	St Finian's (Dublin)	0-14 - 4-09	Cloughbawn (Wexford)	Parnell Park
	C Halpin (1 F2), S Brennan (1F2, 1f) 0-4 each; S Crosbie 0-2; D Butler, B Caffrey, M Murray, D Hattie 0-1 apiece.	Report	C Flood 3-1; S Kehoe 1-2; B Whitty 0-5 (2f); S McDonald 0-1.

1 November 2025 First round	Grangenolvin (Kildare)	1-16 - 1-07	St Brigids Croghan (Offaly)	Cedral St Conleth's Park
	N Doyle 1-2, Conall Bergin 0-4, Cillian Bergin 0-2; F Bergin 0-2 (1f), T Doyle 0-1, J Gannon 0-1, D Costigan 0-1, B Cullen 0-1; O Bergin 0-1 (f), N Bowens 0-1.	Report	A Scally 1-5 (1tpf,2fs), C Donohoe 0-1, T Mooney 0-1.

1 November 2025 First round	Clann na nGael (Meath)	3-20 - 2-08	Glenmore (Kilkenny)	Páirc Tailteann
	T Doyle (1-8, 5fs); S Og Tiernan (1-2); G O’Sullivan (0-4); D O’Donoghue (1-0); L Kelleher, D Doherty (0-2 each); B Corkery, D Kelly (0-1 each)	Report	D Croke (1-3); I Byrne (1-2); C Kirwan (0-2, 1f); E Phelan (0-1)

=== Leinster quarter-finals ===
15 November 2025 Quarter-final	St Brigid's Killashee (Longford)	1-09 - 0-11	Shillelagh–Coolboy (Wicklow)	Pearse Park
	D Farrell (1-3, 1 free), P Mollaghan (0-2), T Killian (0-1), J Casey (0-1); M Farrell (0-1, free), J Willis (0-1).	Report	E Cullen (0-5, 1 two-pointer play, 3 frees); B Behan (0-4), C Byne (0-1), W Kinsella (0-1).

15 November 2025 Quarter-final	Fighting Cocks (Carlow)	2-19 - 1-20	Clann na nGael (Meath)	Netwatch Centre of Excellence
	A Dowling 2-3 (1-0 pen), A Quigley 0-7 (45 2-2pfs), C Fagan 0-3, B Molloy, W Kelly, B Nolan, P Eustace, L Sheppard, M Dowling 0-1 each.	Report	T Doyle 0-7 (3fs 1-2pf), C Smith 0-4 (1-2pfs 2fs), B Corkery 1-0, D Doherty, C Smith (2fs), L Kelleher 0-2 each, D Griffin, R McNamee, S Og Tiernan, J McGrath 0-1 each.

15 November 2025 Quarter-final	Ballinagore (Westmeath)	0-10 - 1-10	Barcelona Gaels; Europe	Kinnegad Grounds
	T McDaniel 0-7 (1 tpf; 2f), D Seery, C Coleman and B Carey 0-1 each.	Report	J O’Donoghue 0-5 (2f), J Toner 1-1, C Murphy, T Sheehy, A McLaughlin and S Fagan 0-1 each.

15 November 2025 Quarter-final	Grangenolvin (Kildare)	1-17 - 1-12	Cloughbawn (Wexford)	Cedral St Conleth's Park
	F Bergin 1-3 (1 free), Conall Bergin 0-5, O Bergin 0-3, B Cullen 0-3 (1 pointer ftree), J Gannon 0-1, N Doyle 0-1, Cillian Bergin 0-1.	Report	C Kehoe 0-4 (1 two1 free), R Whitty 1-2 (penalty, 2 frees), C Flood 0-2, P Whitty 0-2, S Kehoe 0-1, P Cullen 0-1.

=== Leinster semi-finals ===
29 November 2025 Semi-final	St Brigid's Killashee (Longford)	2-09 - 3-11	Fighting Cocks (Carlow)	Glennon Brothers Pearse Park
	D Farrell 1-6 (3fs), P Mollahan 1-1, J Magan, M Farrell (f) 0-1.	Report	A Dowling 2-5 (1-2p), C Fagan 1-2, A Quigley 0-2 (2pf), B Nolan, L Sheppard 0-1 each.

29 November 2025 Semi-final	Grangenolvin (Kildare)	3-14 - 1-03	Barcelona Gaels; Europe	Manguard Park
	O Bergin 1-5, T Doyle 1-1, J Gannon 1-1, F Bergin 0-4, L Doyle 0-2, T Cullen 0-1.		J O'Keeffe 1-0, J O'Donoghue 0-3.

=== Leinster final ===
14 December 2025 Final	Fighting Cocks (Carlow)	1-08 - 1-12	Grangenolvin (Kildare)	SETU Carlow Campus
	C Fagan 1-1, A Dowling 0-4 (1f,2ptf), W Kelly 0-2 (2pf), C McElligott 0-1.	Report	Conall Bergin 1-2, O Bergin 0-3, N Doyle 0-2, F Bergin 0-2 (2f), B Cullen 0-2, T Doyle 0-1.

== Munster Junior Club Football Championship ==
The draw for the Munster Club Championship took place on 31 July 2025.

=== Munster quarter-finals ===
8 November 2025 Quarter-final	Shamrocks (Waterford)	0-05 - 3-21	Buttevant (Cork)	Cappoquin Logistics Fraher Field
	B Hynes 0-3 (1 2pt, 0-1 f), K Crawford (f), Shane Roche 0-1 each.	Report	D Hanlon 2-5 (1 2pt, 1 2pt f), C Hanlon 1-7, M O’Neill 0-4 (1 2pt), S Madigan, J O’Neill, A Horgan, A Trimm, K Sheehan 0-1 each.

8 November 2025 Quarter-final	Killimer (Clare)	1-07 - 4-08	Clonmel Óg (Tipperary)	Kilmihil Grounds
	M Kelleher (0-5), L Callinan (1-0), C Corry (0-1), S Kelly (0-1).	Report	D McVicker (2-4), A Arrigan (1-1), L Hannigan (1-1), S O’ Connor (0-1), C O’Sullivan (0-1).

=== Munster semi-finals ===
22 November 2025 Semi-final	Clonmel Óg (Tipperary)	2-09 - 4-12	Ballymacelligott (Kerry)	Clonmel Sportsfield
	D McVicker (1-5, 1-4 frees), M Jones (1-0), N O’Connor (0-3), C O’Sullivan (0-1).	Report	D Daly (2-2), J Joy (2-1, 1-0 pen), N Collins (0-3), A Breen (0-2, frees), M McKivergan (0-2), D Broderick (0-2, frees).

22 November 2025 Semi-final	Buttevant (Cork)	2-15 - 0-11	Ahane (Limerick)	Kildorrery
	M Lenahan 1-5, C Hanlon 0-5 (0-2 f), D Hanlon 1-1, A Horgan 0-2, S Madigan, K Sheehan 0-1 each.	Report	L Óg Glynn 0-5 (0-3 f), D Dawson 0-3 (1 2pt), R Fox, M Donnellan, P Donohue 0-1 each.

=== Munster final ===
6 December 2025 Final	Buttevant (Cork)	0-08 - 3-12	Ballymacelligott (Kerry)	Mallow GAA Complex
	C Hanlon 0-3 (0-2 f), D Hanlon (2pt f), M Lenahan (2pt) 0-2 each, S Madigan 0-1.	Report	J Joy (pen), D Daly (f), M McKivergan 1-1 each, A Breen 0-4 (2f), N Collins 0-2 (0-2 pointer), M Reilly, D Broderick, D Keane 0-1 each.

== Ulster Junior Club Football Championship ==
Details about the Ulster Club Championship draw.

=== Ulster preliminary round ===
26 October 2025 Preliminary round	Munterconnaught (Cavan)	6-19 - 1-10	Ardglass (Down)	Kingspan Breffni
	Enda O'Shea 1=5, R Nwaneri 2-0, R Gilsenan 1-1, S Hendrick 0-4, S Hanley 1-0, C O'Shea 1-0, N de Kleer 0-2, C Gilsenan 0-2, S Sheridan 0-2, Eoin O'Shea 0-1, C Reilly 0-1.		C O'Shea 0-5, J Crangle 1-0, S Teggart 0-1, J McDarby 0-1, D O'Shea 0-1, S Carr 0-1.

=== Ulster quarter-finals ===
1 November 2025 Quarter-final	St Patrick's, Donagh (Fermanagh)	2-11 - 1-07	St Agnes' (Antrim)	Brewster Park
	J Tormey 1-2, T Cadden 1-1, N Beattie 0-3, D Treacy 0-2, J O'Reilly 0-2, E Maguire 0-1.	Report	C Turley 0-5, D McGaraghan 1-1, C McBride 0-1.

2 November 2025 Quarter-final	Emyvale (Monaghan)	1-16 - 2-12	Carndonagh (Donegal)	St Tiernach's Park
	N McKenna 0-9 4f, D McMahon 1-0, C Forde 0-3 2 ’45 1f, S Askin 0-1 1f, K Gallagher 0-1, M Finn 0-1, A McKenna 0-1	Report	C Doherty 1-3 3f, B McLaughlin 1-0, D Doherty 0-3, F Doherty 0-3 1 2ptf, W Quinn 0-1, C Burke 0-1, A Doherty 0-1

2 November 2025 Quarter-final	Clonmore Robert Emmets (Armagh)	2-15 - 1-18; Penalties: 0-3	Munterconnaught (Cavan)	BOX-IT Athletic Grounds
	R McBennett 1-2, C Donaghy 0-4, S Quigley 1-0, C Cunningham 0-3, John Grimley 0-2, James Grimley 0-2, B Donaghy 0-1, O Atherton 0-1.		Enda O'Shea 0-8, Eoin O'Shea 0-4, R Gilsenan 1-0, C Gilsenan 0-3, S Nolan 0-1, S Hanley 0-1, S Sheridan 0-1.

2 November 2025 Quarter-final	St Mary's Slaughtmanus (Derry)	2-08 - 5-15	Clogher Éire Óg (Tyrone)	Owenbeg Centre of Excellence
	C McGee 1-3, D Quigg 0-3, C Molloy 1-0, B Lyons 0-1, O Carton 0-1.	Report	C Bogue 3-3, R McCaughey 0-5, M McConnell 1-1, C Shields 1-1, C Barkery 0-3, B McKenna 0-1, P McKenna 0-1.

=== Ulster semi-finals ===
15 November 2025 Semi-final	Clogher Éire Óg (Tyrone)	1-24 - 3-13 (aet)	St Patrick's, Donagh (Fermanagh)	St Tiernach's Park
	M McConnell 0-8, C Bogue 0-6, C Shields 0-4, F McCaughey 1-0, S Bogue 0-3, R McCaughey 0-3.	Report	E Maguire 1-5, D Treacy 1-1, C McBrien 0-2, D McManus 0-1, S Daly 0-1, T Cadden 0-1, J Torney 0-1, D O'Reilly 0-1.

16 November 2025 Semi-final	Emyvale (Monaghan)	1-18 - 0-08	Munterconnaught (Cavan)	Shamrock Park
	N McKenna 1-4, M Finn 0-6, K Gallagher 0-2, H Colleran 0-2, A McCabe 0-2, B Ryan 0-1, D Sherry 0-1.	Report	S Hendrick 0-2, N de Kleer 0-2, Enda O'Shea 0-2, R Nwaneri 0-1, J McCabe 0-1.

=== Ulster final ===
23 November 2025 Final	Clogher Éire Óg (Tyrone)	1-12 - 0-14	Emyvale (Monaghan)	Shamrock Park
	C Bogue 1-3, R McElroy 0-3, C Shields 0-2, R McCaughey 0-2, J Callaghan 0-1, M McConnell 0-1.	Report	C Forde 0-8, N McKenna 0-2, K Gallagher 0-2, M Finn 0-1 D Sherry 0-1.

== All-Britain Club Football Championship ==
=== Britain preliminary round ===
12 October 2025 Preliminary round robin	Bristol Harps (Gloucestershire)	5-15 - 0-11	Hugh O'Neills (Yorkshire)	St Marys

19 October 2025 Preliminary round robin	St Joseph's, Waltham Cross (Hertfordshire)	1-12 - 2-8	Bristol Harps (Gloucestershire)	Radlett Road

26 October 2025 Preliminary round robin	Hugh O'Neills (Yorkshire)	1-5 - 4-18	St Joseph's, Waltham Cross (Hertfordshire)	Páirc Beeston

=== Britain quarter-final ===
2 November 2025 Quarter-final	St Joseph's, Waltham Cross (Hertfordshire)	1-6 - 4-17	Tara (London)	McGovern Park

=== Britain semi-finals ===
9 November 2025 Semi-final	Tara (London)	2-14 - 0-8	St Brendan's (Lancashire)	Páirc na hÉireann

9 November 2025 Semi-final	Sean McDermott's (Warwickshire)	0-12 - 0-8	Dunedin Connollys (Scotland)	Old Bedians

=== Britain final ===
23 November 2025 Final	Sean McDermott's (Warwickshire)	1-13 - 3-12	Tara (London)	Páirc na hÉireann

== All-Ireland Junior Club Football Championship ==
=== All-Ireland quarter-final ===
6 December 2025 Quarter-Final	Clogher Éire Óg (Tyrone)	2-11 - 1-13	Tara (London)	Mullaghmoyle Park
	M McConnell 1-5, C Bogue 1-3 (0-2f), C Shields, C Barkey, R McCaughey (f) 0-1 each.	Report	S McCready 1-3, S Rafter 0-7 (4f).

=== All-Ireland semi-finals ===
3 January 2026 Semi-final	Kiltimagh (Mayo)	0-09 - 2-13	Clogher Éire Óg (Tyrone)	Heartland Credit Union Páirc Seán Mac Diarmada
	T Keegan 0-4 (3f), P Kelly 0-2 (1tp), O Mulderrig 0-1, C Mallee 0-1f, A Cosgrove 0-1.	Report	C Bogue 2-4 (0-1f), R McCaughey 0-5 (1f), R McElroy 0-2 (1 ’45, 1f), V Lowry 0-1, C Shields 0-1.

3 January 2026 Semi-final	Grangenolvin (Kildare)	0-16 - 2-13	Ballymacelligott (Kerry)	Mick Neville Park
	F Bergin (0-9, 5 frees, 1 2pf), C Bergin (0-2), T Cullen (0-2), D Costigan, K McGloin, O Bergin (0-1 each).	Report	D Broderick (0-6, 1 2pf, 4 frees), N Collins, A Sheehy (1-0 each), J Joy, D Daly (0-2 each), A Breen, M McKivergan, D Keane (0-1 each).

=== All-Ireland final ===
11 January 2026 Final	Clogher Éire Óg (Tyrone)	0-13 - 1-16	Ballymacelligott (Kerry)	Croke Park
	C Bogue (0-5, 0-2 frees, 1 tp); M Shields (1 tp), M McConnell (0-2 each); C Barkey, S Bogue, R McCaughey (free), M McCaughey (0-1 each).	Report	D Broderick (0-4, 2 frees, 1 tpf); D Daly (1-1); A Breen (0-3, frees); D Keane, J Joy (0-2 each); A Sheehy, M McKivergan (45), M Reidy, N Collins (0-1 each).	Referee: S Mulhare (Laois)

== Championship statistics ==
=== Top scorers ===
Rank	Player	Club	Tally	Total	Matches	Average
1	Ciarán Bogue	Clogher Éire Óg	7-24	45	6	7.50
2	Dylan Farrell	St Brigid's Killashee	4-19	31	3	10.33
3	Aaron Dowling	Fighting Cocks	4-12	24	3	8.00
4	Marc McConnell	Clogher Éire Óg	2-17	23	6	3.83
4	Fionn Bergin	Grangenolvin	1-20	23	5	4.60
6	Donal Daly	Ballymacelligott	4-06	18	4	4.50
6	Darragh McVicker	Clonmel Óg	3-09	18	2	9.00
6	Tomás Doyle	Clann na nGael	1-15	18	2	9.00
6	Enda O'Shea	Munterconnaught	1-15	18	3	6.00
6	Niall McKenna	Emyvale	1-15	18	3	6.00
6	Conor Hanlon	Buttevant	1-15	18	3	6.00
