= 2024–25 All-Ireland Junior Club Football Championship =

Football competition

- Dates: 26 October 2024 – January 2025
- Teams: 34
- Sponsor: Allied Irish Bank
- Champions: An Cheathrú Rua
- Runners-up: Naomh Pádraig Uisce Chaoin

Tournament statistics
- Top scorer(s): James Horgan (5-18)

Provincial Champions
- Munster: Kilmurry
- Leinster: Ballinagar
- Ulster: Naomh Pádraig Uisce Chaoin
- Connacht: An Cheathrú Rua

The 2024–25 All-Ireland Junior Club Football Championship is the 23rd staging of the All-Ireland Junior Club Football Championship since its establishment by the Gaelic Athletic Association for the 2001–02 season. The championship is scheduled to run from 26 October 2024 to January 2025.

== Connacht Junior Club Football Championship ==
=== Connacht quarter-final ===
10 November 2024 Quarter-final	Ballymote Round Towers (Sligo)	3-11 - 1-10	Bornacoola (Leitrim)	Markievicz Park
	Z O’Dowd 1-3; M Lavin 0-4; O Brennan & D McTiernan 1-0 each; J Lavin 0-2, 2f; S Langton (f) & N Colsh (f) 0-1 each.	Report	D Moran 0-5, 4f; C Mallon 1-1; A Croghan, B Duffy, D Mulligan & J Boyle 0-1 each.

=== Connacht semi-finals ===
16 November 2024 Semi-final	Ballymote Round Towers (Sligo)	2-16 - 0-09	St Barry's (Roscommon)	Markievicz Park
	Z O'Dowd 1-3, M Healy 1-0, N Colsh 0-3, O Brennan 0-3, M Lavin 0-3, A Brennan 0-2, J Lavin 0-1, S Langton 0-1.	Report	C McManus 0-3, J Murtagh 0-2, A O'Boyle 0-1, E Diffley 0-1, F Leavy 0-1, K Cawley 0-1.

16 November 2024 Semi-final	An Cheathrú Rua (Galway)	1-11 - 0-07	Cill Chomáin (Mayo)	Tuam Stadium
	É Mac Cormaic 1-3, M Ó Domhnaill 0-3, F Ó Sé 0-1, P Ó Loideáin 0-1, F Ó Conghaile 0-1, C Ó Domhnaill 0-1, O Ó Lochnáin 0-1.	Report	D Moran 0-4, J Mason 0-1, K Gallagher 0-1, Jack Healy 0-1.

=== Connacht final ===
30 November 2024 Final	An Cheathrú Rua (Galway)	4-12 - 2-10	Ballymote Round Towers (Sligo)	Tuam Stadium
	F Ó Sé 1-5, M Ó Domhnaill 1-3, D Ó Sé 1-1, P Mac Donnacha 1-0, S Ó Briain 0-1, P Ó Loideáin 0-1, O Ó Lochnáin 0-1.	Report	D McTiernan 1-2, C Finn 1-1, T Sweeney 0-2, J Lavin 0-2, S Langton 0-1, C Meehan 0-1, C Kilcoyne 0-1.

== Leinster Junior Club Football Championship ==
The draw for the Leinster Club Championship took place in June 2024. In defeating Conahy Shamrocks in the first round, Barcelona Gaels notably became the first Gaelic Games Europe club to win a match in Leinster.

=== Leinster first round ===
2 November 2024 First round	Ballon (Carlow)	1-11 - 2-17	Ballinagar (Offaly)	Netwatch Cullen Park
	E Corr 0-5, P Zerafa 1-0, J Nolan 0-1, L Doyle 0-1, S Duffy 0-1, C Bolger 0-1, J Maher 0-1, T Maher 0-1.		R Gallagher 2-4, G O'Meara 0-5, J Beatty 0-3, S Dwane 0-2, C Bracken 0-1, M Tynan 0-1, J Ballesty 0-1.

2 November 2024 First round	Kilcavan (Laois)	0-05 - 0-04	Craobh Chiaráin (Dublin)	Laois Hire O'Moore Park
	C Ryle 0-3, A Tarpey 0-1, A Hunt 0-1.	Report	B Ryan 0-3, G Kelly 0-1.

2 November 2024 First round	Craanford Fr O'Regan's (Wexford)	0-07 - 1-09	Grattan Óg (Longford)	Samaritans St Patrick's Park
	J O'Regan 0-4, N Berney 0-2, J Doyle 0-1.	Report	J Hand 0-5, G Hand 1-0, E Kinlan 0-2, H Mulvihill 0-1, T Nerney 0-1.

2 November 2024 First round	Conahy Shamrocks (Kilkenny)	1-05 - 3-11	Barcelona Gaels (Europe)	UPMC Nowlan Park
	J Bergin (1-3, 0-3 frees); K Downey (0-1, 0-1 free); S McNamee (0-1).	Report	A Hayes (2-1); E O’Connor (1-4, 0-2 frees); T Sheehy (0-3, 0-3 frees); C Murphy (0-2); S Victory (0-1).

2 November 2024 First round	Castletown-Finea-Coole-Whitehall (Westmeath)	0-04 - 0-05	Ellistown (Kildare)	Kinnegad Grounds
	J Rabbitt 0-3f, O Gaffney 0-1f.	Report	T Watson 0-3 (1f), D Watson 0-1, C Lindy 0-1.

=== Leinster quarter-finals ===
9 November 2024 Quarter-final	Dunsany (Meath)	2-10 - 1-07	Aughrim (Wicklow)	Páirc Tailteann
	Jack Cottrell (1-4, 1-0 penalty), James Cahill (1-0); Eoin Harkin (0-3 frees), Mark Horan (0-1), Luke Horan (0-1), Kris Gorman (0-1).	Report	A Kavanagh (1-1), C Phelan (0-4 three frees), K Keogh (0-1), J McGuckian (0-1).

9 November 2024 Quarter-final	Kilcavan (Laois)	1-09 - 0-11	Barcelona Gaels (Europe)	Laois Hire O'Moore Park
	C Ryle 0-7 (0-6fs), O Lalor 1-0, R Hunt and R Lalor 0-1 each.	Report	T Sheehy 0-6 (0-5fs), A Hayes 0-2, A O’Brien (45), S Victory and C Leonard 0-1 each.

9 November 2024 Quarter-final	Ballinagar (Offaly)	0-16 - 1-11 (aet)	Wolfe Tones (Louth)	Glenisk O'Connor Park
	R Gallagher 0-7, M Tynan 0-4, S Dwane 0-2 (1f, 1mk), G O’Meara 0-2 (2f), A Strong 0-1.	Report	A Fanning 1-0, G Cooney 0-3 (2f), R Taaffe 0-3 (1f), L Gaffney 0-2, T Rock 0-1, M Healy 0-1, D Weldon 0-1.

9 November 2024 Quarter-final	Ellistown (Kildare)	0-12 - 0-11	Grattan Óg (Longford)	Manguard Park
	P Martin 0-3, E O'Loughlin 0-2, T Watson 0-2 (1f), E Donnelly 0-2, C Lindy 0-1, C Lindy 0-1, D Watson 0-1.	Report	E Kinlan 0-6 (3fs), J Hand 0-2fs, T Nerney 0-1, R Murray 0-1f, W Stokes 0-1.

=== Leinster semi-finals ===
23 November 2024 Semi-final	Dunsany (Meath)	1-14 - 1-10	Kilcavan (Laois)	Páirc Tailteann
	E Harkin 0-7, L Horan 1-0, J Cottrell 0-3, H Cahill 0-2, K Gorman and C Murphy 0-1 each	Report	C Ryle 0-8, A Hunt 1-0, R Labor 0-2

23 November 2024 Semi-final	Ballinagar (Offaly)	0-09 - 0-08	Ellistown (Kildare)	Glenisk O'Connor Park
	R Gallagher 0-3 (2ms), S Dwane 0-2(1f), G O'Meara 0-2fs, M Tynan 0-1, A Gorman 0-1.	Report	E O'Loughlin 0-2, P Martin 0-1, C Lindy 0-1, C O Loughlin 0-1, C Lindy 0-1f, D Dunne 0-1, M Lennox 0-1.

=== Leinster final ===
1 December 2024 Final	Dunsany (Meath)	0-08 - 2-09	Ballinagar (Offaly)	Páirc Tailteann
	E Harkin 0-6, M Horan 0-1, J Cottrell 0-1.	Report	G O’Meara 1-5, S Dwane 1-1, M Tynan 0-2, C McGuinness 0-1.

== Munster Junior Club Football Championship ==
The draw for the Munster Club Championship took place on 25 July 2024.

=== Munster quarter-finals ===
9 November 2024 Quarter-final	Kilmurry (Cork)	1-14 - 1-11	Michael Cusack's (Clare)	Cloughduv Grounds
	L Wall 0-8 (0-4 f), T Collins 1-1 pen, John O’Mullane 0-2, A Asling, R Duggan, Joe O’Mullane 0-1 each.	Report	S McNamara 0-8 (0-6 f), S Brosnan 1-0, D McMahon 0-2 (0-1 f), J Droney 0-1.

9 November 2024 Quarter-final	Fenor (Waterford)	0-07 - 5-13	Firies (Kerry)	Walsh Park
	R Lynch 0-5 (1f); M Nicholls 0-1, D Purcell 0-1.	Report	J Horgan 4-8 (0-4f, 0-1 ‘45’), M Daly 1-1, P de Bruin 0-2, D Donohue 0-1, C Doe 0-1.

=== Munster semi-finals ===
23 November 2024 Semi-final	Cashel King Cormacs (Tipperary)	1-02 - 4-23	Kilmurry (Cork)	Fethard Town Park
	C McGrath (1-0), D O’Grady (free) and J Browne (0-1 each).	Report	L Wall (1-4), Lawrence Asling (1-3), James O’Mullane (0-6), R Leahy and Joe O’Mullane (1-1 each), J McGinn (0-4 frees), Lloyd Asling (0-2), B Hinchion and K Kelleher (0-1 each).

23 November 2024 Semi-final	Firies (Kerry)	3-17 - 2-11	Cappagh (Limerick)	Austin Stack Park
	J Horgan (1-5, 4fs), S Palmer (1-4), D O’Mahony (1-0), J Flynn, D Donohue and D Brosnan (0-2 each), C Doe and M Daly (0-1 each).	Report	S O’Carroll (1-8, 4fs, 1-0 pen), C O’Carroll (1-1), J Lanigan and J Fitzgerald (f) (0-1 each).

=== Munster final ===
7 December 2024 Final	Kilmurry (Cork)	1-10 - 0-09	Firies (Kerry)	Mick Neville Park
	L Wall (1-4, 0-3 frees); Lawrence Aisling (0-2); K Kelleher, R Duggan, D O’Mullane (free), John O’Mullane (0-1 each).	Report	J Horgan (0-5, 0-2 frees); D Brosnan (0-2); M Daly, J Flynn (0-1 each).	Referee: E Morrissey (Waterford)

== Ulster Junior Club Football Championship ==
=== Ulster preliminary round ===
26 October 2024 Preliminary round	Craigbane (Derry)	1-08 - 0-07	Killeeshil St Mary's (Tyrone)	Owenbeg Centre of Excellence
	L Moore (1-1,1f), J Og Moore (0-2), D Lowry, B Gormley, C McLaughlin, B Rainey and Jude McLaughlin (0-1) each.	Report	T Hoy (0-2), C Donaghy(0-2f), D O’Neill, and M O’Neill (0-1) each and B O’Neill (0-1’45)

=== Ulster quarter-finals ===
2 November 2024 Quarter-final	Naomh Pádraig Uisce Chaoin (Donegal)	0-12 - 0-08	Naomh Comhghall (Antrim)	O'Donnell Park
	J Toye 0-5,2f; K Doherty 0-3,2f; Cormac McColgan 0-3; D McKinney 0-1.	Report	T Patchett 0-3,3f; D Murdock 0-2; R Clarke 0-2; J McCabe 0-1.

3 November 2024 Quarter-final	Aghadrumsee St Macartan's (Armagh)	1-09 - 1-10	Drumhowan (Monaghan)	Shamrock Park
	M O'Hara 1-0, E Courtney 0-3, A Bannon 0-2, A Durnien 0-2, D Kearns 0-1, D McCarville 0-1.	Report	L McGuirk 1-1, K Mooney 0-3, C Reilly 0-3, T Doherty 0-2, K McAdam 0-1.

3 November 2024 Quarter-final	Knockbride (Cavan)	1-07 - 1-10	Craigbane (Derry)	Kingspan Breffni
	B Mulvey 1-0, L Reilly (2fs), C Smith (f), L Fay 0-2 each and M Smith 0-1	Report	L Moore 0-5 (2f), Jude McLaughlin 1-2 (1f), F Mortimer 0-2 and C McLaughlin 0-1

3 November 2024 Quarter-final	Dromara (Down)	1-13 - 1-14	Collegeland O'Rahilly's (Armagh)	Páirc Esler
	L Savage 0-4 (2f), C Kelly 0-3 (3f), B McNeill 1-0, B McKey 0-3 (1m), C Flanagan 0-2, P Flynn 0-1.	Report	C McQuaid 1-6 (2f), Jason Kelly 0-2 (1f), O Murphy 0-2 (1f) James Kelly 0-1, S McKenna 0-1, N McParland 0-1, P McGeary 0-1.

=== Ulster semi-finals ===
16 November 2024 Semi-final	Collegeland O'Rahilly's (Armagh)	1-04 - 1-11	Naomh Pádraig Uisce Chaoin (Donegal)	O'Neill's Healy Park
	C McQuad 1-1; B Finnegan 0-1; C McQuade 0-1; J Kelly 0-1,1f.	Report	D McKinney 1-0; J Toye 0-2; R Hirrell 0-3; K Doherty 0-2,1f; Cormac McColgan 0-2; O McIntyre 0-1; R Hoy 0-1.

16 November 2024 Semi-final	Craigbane (Derry)	1-11 - 1-11; Penalties: 5-4	Drumhowan (Monaghan)	O'Neill's Healy Park
	B Rainey (1-0), L Moore (0-7, 5f), Jude McLaughlin (0-3, 2f), F Mortimer (0-1	Report	C Reilly (1-0), T Doherty (0-5, 3m), A Brennan (0-1), A Quinn (0-2, 2f), G Quinn (0-1), L McGuirk (0-1), K Mooney (0-1).

=== Ulster final ===
23 November 2024 Final	Craigbane (Derry)	1-12 - 3-07	Naomh Pádraig Uisce Chaoin (Donegal)	Celtic Park
	J Og Moore (1-1), Jude McLaughlin (0-4, 1f), L Moore (0-4, 2f), A Sharkey (0-1), E Coll (0-1), James McLaughlin (0-1),	Report	Caolan McColgan (1-1), D McKinney (1-0), K Lynch (1-1, 1f), Cormac McColgan (0-2), J Toye (0-1, 1f), K Doherty (0-1, 1f), K Lynch (0-1),

== All-Britain Club Football Championship ==
=== Britain preliminary round ===
Preliminary round robin	Hugh O'Neills (Yorkshire)	2-10 - 3-10	St Jude's (Gloucestershire)	Páirc Beeston

Preliminary round robin	St Joseph's, Waltham Cross (Hertfordshire)	4-27 - 0-2	Hugh O'Neills (Yorkshire)	Radlett Road

Preliminary round robin	St Jude's (Gloucestershire)	2-14 - 1-11	St Joseph's, Waltham Cross (Hertfordshire)	Test Park Sports Ground

=== Britain quarter-final ===
Quarter-final	Dunedin Connollys (Scotland)	4-7 - 0-7	St Jude's (Gloucestershire)	Old Bedians

=== Britain semi-finals ===
Semi-final	Tara (London)	1-9 - 0-7	John Mitchels (Lancashire)	Páirc na hÉireann

Semi-final	Dunedin Connollys (Scotland)	2-6 - 1-15	Roger Casement's (Warwickshire)	Old Bedians

=== Britain final ===
Final	Tara (London)	3-4 - 1-7	Roger Casement's (Warwickshire)	McGovern Park

== All-Ireland Junior Club Football Championship ==
=== All-Ireland quarter-final ===
5 January 2025 Quarter-final	Tara (London)	1-08 - 4-10	Naomh Pádraig Uisce Chaoin (Donegal)	McGovern Park
		Report

=== All-Ireland semi-finals ===
5 January 2025 Semi-final	An Cheathrú Rua (Galway)	1-09 - 0-11	Ballinagar (Offaly)	King & Moffatt Dr Hyde
	Maitiú Ó Domhnaill (1-1); James Ó Flatharta (0-2, 45s); Pádraig Mac Donnacha (0-1); Padraig Ó Loideáin (0-1); Fionán Ó Conghaile (0-1); Michéal Ó Briain (0-1); Feargal Ó Sé (0-1f); Paudie Mac Cormaic (0-1)	Report	Geordi O'Meara (0-3 (0-2f)); Robbie Gallagher (0-2); Steven Dwane (0-2f); Jacob Beatty (0-2); Morgan Tynan (0-1); Adam Joyce (0-1)

12 January 2025 Semi-final	Kilmurry (Cork)	1-13 - 2-10 (4-13 - 3-10 after Penalties)	Naomh Pádraig Uisce Chaoin (Donegal)	Parnell Park

=== All-Ireland final ===
25 January 2025 Final	An Cheathrú Rua (Galway)	v	Naomh Pádraig Uisce Chaoin (Donegal)	Croke Park

== Championship statistics ==
=== Top scorers ===
Overall

Rank	Player	Club	Tally	Total	Matches	Average
1	James Horgan	Firies	5-18	33	3	11.00
2	Liam Wall	Kilmurry	2-16	22	3	7.33
3	Robbie Gallagher	Ballinagar	2-14	20	4	5.00
3	Lee Moore	Craigbane	1-17	20	4	5.00
5	Cian Ryle	Kilcavan	0-18	18	3	6.00
6	Geordi O'Meara	Ballinagar	1-14	17	4	4.25
7	Eoin Harkin	Dunsany	0-16	16	3	5.33
8	Caolan McQuaid	Collegeland O'Rahilly's	2-08	14	2	7.00
9	Jude McLaughin	Craigbane	1-10	13	4	3.25
10	Séamus O'Carroll	Cappagh	1-08	11	1	11.00
10	Jack Cottrell	Dunsany	1-08	11	3	3.66

In a single game

Rank	Player	Club	Tally	Total	Opposition
1	James Horgan	Firies	4-08	20	Fenor
2	Séamus O'Carroll	Cappagh	1-08	11	Firies
3	Robbie Gallagher	Ballinagar	2-04	10	Ballon
4	Caolan McQuaid	Collegeland O'Rahilly's	1-06	9	Dromara
5	Fergal Ó Sé	An Cheathrú Rua	1-05	8	Ballymote Round Towers
5	Geordi O'Meara	Ballinagar	1-05	8	Dunsany
5	James Horgan	Firies	1-05	8	Cappagh
5	Cian Ryle	Kilcavan	0-08	8	Dunsany
5	Liam Wall	Kilmurry	0-08	8	Michael Cusack's
5	Seán McNamara	Michael Cusack's	0-08	8	Kilmurry
