= 2023–24 All-Ireland Junior Club Football Championship =

- Dates: 21 October 2023 – 14 January 2024
- Teams: 33
- Sponsor: Allied Irish Bank
- Champions: Arva (1st title); Ciarán Brady (captain); Finbar O'Reilly (manager)
- Runners-up: Listowel Emmets; Niall Collins (captain); Enda Murphy (manager)

Tournament statistics
- Matches played: 33
- Goals scored: 70 (2.12 per match)
- Points scored: 590 (17.88 per match)
- Top scorer(s): Kevin Bouchier (1–26)

Provincial Champions
- Munster: Listowel Emmets
- Leinster: Milltown
- Ulster: Arva
- Connacht: Lahardane McHales

The 2023–24 All-Ireland Junior Club Football Championship was the 22nd staging of the All-Ireland Junior Club Football Championship since its establishment by the Gaelic Athletic Association for the 2001–02 season. The draws for the respective provincial championships took place at various stages. The championship ran from 21 October 2023 to 14 January 2024.

The All-Ireland final was played on 14 January 2024 at Croke Park in Dublin, between Arva from Cavan and Listowel Emmets from Kerry, in what was their first ever meeting in the final. Arva won the match by 0–13 to 0–10 to claim their first ever All-Ireland title.

Arva's Kevin Bouchier was the championship's top scorer with 1-26.

== Connacht Junior Club Football Championship ==
=== Connacht quarter-final ===
11 November 2023 Quarter-final	Menlough (Galway)	1-13 - 0-10	St Michael's (Roscommon)	Tuam Stadium
	R Hughes 0-5, S Hansberry 1-0, N Carty 0-2, D Loftus 0-2, J Fahy-Hansberry 0-1, M Glynn 0-1, K Reilly 0-1, B Laheen 0-1.	Report	F Henry 0-6, A O'Hara 0-2, N Sheerin 0-1, J Lane 0-1.

=== Connacht semi-finals ===
19 November 2023 Semi-final	Owenmore Gaels (Sligo)	0-14 - 1-08	Glenfarne-Kiltyclogher (Leitrim)	Connacht GAA Centre
	A Mullen 0-8, C Davey 0-2, K Mullen 0-1, J Callaghan 0-1, M Walsh 0-1, D Walsh 0-1.		P Gilgunn 1-4, F Clancy 0-2, P Sweeney 0-2.

19 November 2023 Semi-final	Lahardane McHales (Mayo)	0-12 - 1-09; Penalties: 5-3	Menlough (Galway)	Hastings Insurance MacHale Park
	J Maughan 0-6, S Loftus 0-2, M Murphy 0-2, A Leonard 0-1, E Fergus 0-1.		R Hughes 0-6, K Reilly 1-0, T Mannion 0-1, N Carty 0-1, S Hansberry 0-1.

=== Connacht final ===
2 December 2023 Final	Lahardane McHales (Mayo)	3-10 - 1-12	Owenmore Gaels (Sligo)	Hastings Insurance MacHale Park
	K Jordan 1-2, S Finnerty 1-1, M Maughan 1-1 (0-1m), M Noone 0-2, A Leonard 0-2, D Walsh 0-1, James Maughan 0-1.	Report	A Mullen 0-7 (0-5f), D Walsh 1-2, D Callaghan 0-3 (0-1f)

== Leinster Junior Club Football Championship ==
=== Leinster round 1 ===
21 October 2023 Round 1	Kilbride (Meath)	0-13 - 0-12	Amsterdam (Europe)	Killegland West
	A Malone 0-5, D O'Leary 0-5, Z McGovern 0-2, A Barker 0-1.		C Kenny 0-5, G McDermott 0-3, C Brennan 0-2, S Strain 0-1, A Hughes 0-1.

21 October 2023 Round 1	St Mullin's (Carlow)	1-08 - 1-11	Annanough (Laois)	Carlow IT Grounds
	C Kavanagh 1-1, S Murphy 0-4, J Doyle 0-2, M Kavanagh 0-1.		D McCaul 1-6, C Kelliher 0-1, J Fennelly 0-1, S Shortall 0-1, K Horgan 0-1, J Scully 0-1.

21 October 2023 Round 1	Glyde Rangers (Louth)	1-08 - 0-09	Daingean (Offaly)	Darver COE
	C Sheridan 1-3, A Kirk 0-3, O Lynch 0-1, T O'Brien 0-1.		S Tierney 0-4, J Hayes 0-2, O Connolly 0-1, A McEvoy 0-1, C McEvoy 0-1.

21 October 2023 Round 1	Kilbeggan Shamrocks (Westmeath)	1-15 - 2-07	Lisdowney (Kilkenny)	Lakepoint Park
	D Fennell 1-3, C Delaney 0-6, N Scally 0-4, S Pidgeon 0-1, C Draper 0-1.		D O'Carroll 1-1, A Fogarty 1-1, V Fitzpatrick 0-1, K O'Sullivan 0-1, E Kenny 0-1, M Kenny 0-1, K Dunne 0-1.

=== Leinster quarter-finals ===
4 November 2023 Quarter-final	Annanough (Laois)	2-09 - 2-11 (aet)	Glyde Rangers (Louth)	Bill Delaney Park
	D McCaul 1-5, K Horgan 0-4, J Fenlon 1-0.		C Sheridan 1-3, L Finnegan 1-0, A Kirk 0-3, B Duffy 0-2, K Scott 0-1, T O'Brien 0-1, A Devlin 0-1.

4 November 2023 Quarter-final	Kilbride (Meath)	1-07 - 1-11	Milltown (Kildare)	Killegland West
	Z McGovern 1-2, D O'Leary 0-2, T Farrell 0-1, C McWeeney 0-1, J Harford 0-1.		D McKenna 1-2, H Hamilton 0-3, P Donohoe 0-2, B Curran 0-1, K Heuston 0-1, C O'Shea 0-1, C Sheerin 0-1.

4 November 2023 Quarter-final	Kilbeggan Shamrocks (Westmeath)	4-06 - 2-02	Ballymore (Longford)	The Downs Grounds
	N Scally 2-0, P Fennell 1-1, C Delaney 0-4, D Scully 1-0, C Finn 0-1.		G O'Hara 1-0, G Kelly 1-0, D Monaghan 0-2.

4 November 2023 Quarter-final	Ballinacor (Wicklow)	0-10 - 2-09	Man-O-War (Dublin)	Ballinacor Grounds
	J Murphy 0-3, P Byrne 0-3, D Byrne 0-1, T Mulconry 0-1, P Kennedy 0-1, G Byrne 0-1.		C Dolan 0-5, J Fleming 1-0, F Slattery 1-0, S Hussey 0-3, W Moore 0-1.

=== Leinster semi-finals ===
18 November 2023 Semi-final	Kilbeggan Shamrocks (Westmeath)	2-06 - 1-16	Milltown (Kildare)	Fr O'Brien Park
	P Fennell 1-1, D Fennell 1-0, N Scally 0-2, C Delaney 0-2, D Coffey 0-1.		P Donoghue 0-7, K Byrne 1-0, D McKenna 0-2, R O'Shea 0-2, B Curran 0-2, C Sheerin 0-2, A Jacob 0-1.

18 November 2023 Semi-final	Man-O-War (Dublin)	0-07 - 0-09	Glyde Rangers (Louth)	Naul Grounds
	C Dolan 0-4, S Clancy 0-2, W Moore 0-1.		C Sheridan 0-4, K Scott 0-2, B Duffy 0-1, A Kirk 0-1, O Lynch 0-1.

=== Leinster final ===
3 December 2023 Final	Milltown (Kildare)	1-09 - 1-04	Glyde Rangers (Louth)	Hawkfield Kildare COE
	D McKenna 1-1, C Sheerin 0-3 (0-1 frees), K Byrne 0-2, P Donohoe 0-2 (0-1 frees), A Jacob 0-1.	Report	C Sheridan 1-2 (0-1 45'), B Duffy 0-2 (0-1 frees).

== Munster Junior Club Football Championship ==
=== Munster quarter-finals ===
11 November 2023 Quarter-final	Seán Treacys (Tipperary)	1-06 - 2-16	Kilmurry (Cork)	Templetuohy Grounds
	P O’Leary 0-5 (0-4 f), P Deegan (1-0), P Dawson (0-1).	Report	S Warren (1-7, 5f), L Wall (1-2), J McGinn, J O’Mullane (0-2 each), W Ronan, K Kelleher, B Hinchion (0-1 each).

18 November 2023 Quarter-final	Killimer (Clare)	0-09 - 0-05	Affane (Waterford)	Páirc Naomh Mhuire
	C Pyne, M Kelleher, J Kelleher (2f) 0-2 each, K Hassett, F McKeown, P Browne 0-1 each.	Report	A O'Sullivan, G Fives (f) 0-2 each, K O'Sullivan 0-1.

=== Munster semi-finals ===
25 November 2023 Semi-final	Killimer (Clare)	2-02 - 5-17	Listowel Emmets (Kerry)	Páirc Naomh Mhuire
	C Pyne (1-0), P Browne (1-0), M Kelleher (0-1), J Kelleher (0-1m).	Report	D Keane (2-3, 1f), S Keane (0-5), JJ Grimes (1-0 pen), D Lynch (1-0), A O’Rourke (1-0), B Sweeney (0-3, 1m), J McElligott (0-2), C Mulvihill (0-1), J McVeigh (0-1), C Pierse (0-1), K Holly (0-1).

25 November 2023 Semi-final	Kilmurry (Cork)	4-16 - 0-02	Feenagh–Kilmeedy (Limerick)	Cloughduv Grounds
	L Wall and P Berhanu (2-2 each), S Warren (0-4), B Henchion and L Aisling (0-2 each), R Duggan, R Leahy, G Barrett and Joe O’Mullane, (0-1 each).	Report	C Ryan (0-2, 0-1 free).

=== Munster final ===
9 December 2023 Final	Listowel Emmets (Kerry)	0-09 - 1-02	Kilmurry (Cork)	Mallow GAA Complex
	S Tarrant (0-3 frees), D Keane (0-2 frees), S Keane (0-2, 0-1 free), B Sweeney and J McVeigh (0-1 each).	Report	G Barrett (1-0), B Hinchion and T Collins (0-1 each).	Referee: T McGrath (Limerick)

== Ulster Junior Club Football Championship ==
=== Ulster preliminary round ===
28 October 2023 Preliminary round	Ballyhegan (Armagh)	1-06 - 1-16	Fintona Pearses (Tyrone)	BOX-IT Athletic Grounds
	M Hughes 1-1, J McCormack 0-4, P McGrane 0-1.		A McCarney 0-6, C McGillion 1-2, O Hughes 0-2, J Brogan 0-2, C Donnelly 0-2, P Kelly 0-1, P McGlinn 0-1.

=== Ulster quarter-finals ===
4 November 2023 Quarter-final	Na Rossa (Donegal)	2-05 - 1-09	Lisnaskea Emmetts (Fermanagh)	O'Donnell Park
	A McHugh 1-1, O Molloy 1-0, C Bonner 0-3, O Caulfield 0-1.		D Óg Kelly 1-2, J McDade 0-2, C Clarke 0-1, S Keenan 0-1, P Mohan 0-1, H Lynch 0-1, E McCaffrey 0-1.

5 November 2023 Quarter-final	Blackhill (Monaghan)	5-11 - 1-07	St Mary's, Rasharkin (Antrim)	St Tiernach's Park
	P Donnelly (2-3, 0-2 frees), D McElroy (1-4, 1-0 pen, 0-1 free, 0-1mark), T Geehan (1-1), H Byrne (1-1); J Daly (0-1), N Donnelly (0-1 mark).		É McNeill (1-6, 0-3 frees), R Lynch (0-1 free).

5 November 2023 Quarter-final	Ballymaguigan (Derry)	0-08 - 2-17	Arva (Cavan)	Owenbeg COE
	P O'Neill 0-5, T Brady 0-1, B McGlone 0-1, M Spiers 0-1.		K Bouchier 1-2, P Morris 0-4, P Finnegan 1-0, T Noach-Hoffman 0-3, C Sheridan 0-3, B Donnelly 0-1, S Sheridan 0-1, J McCabe 0-1, D Ellis 0-1, C Brady 0-1.

5 November 2023 Quarter-final	Fintona Pearses (Tyrone)	0-11 - 0-07	Drumaness (Down)	O'Neill's Healy Park
	A McCarney 0-6, C McGillion 0-3, P McGlinn 0-1, T McGrath 0-1.		G Murdock 0-3, P Gilchrist 0-1, T McConville 0-1, O Crew 0-1, C Dougan 0-1.

=== Ulster semi-finals ===
18 November 2023 Semi-final	Blackhill (Monaghan)	2-10 - 0-07	Fintona Pearses (Tyrone)	Kingspan Breffni Park
	P Donnelly 2-4, D McElroy 0-2, J Daly 0-1, H Byrne 0-1, C Courtney 0-1, T Geehan 0-1.		A McCarney 0-4, C McGillion 0-2, C Donnelly 0-1.

18 November 2023 Semi-final	Arva (Cavan)	1-11 - 0-04	Lisnaskea Emmetts (Fermanagh)	St Tiernach's Park
	K Bouchier 0-7, P Morris 1-0, B Brady 0-1, T Noach-Hoffman 0-1, B Donnelly 0-1, J McCabe 0-1.		Justin McDade 0-2, H Lynch 0-1, Joe McDade 0-1.

=== Ulster final ===
25 November 2023 Final	Arva (Cavan)	0-13 - 0-06	Blackhill (Monaghan)	Shamrock Park
	K Bouchier (0-6, 0-4 frees), C Brady (0-2), T Partington (0-1), C Sheridan (0-1 free), S Sheridan (0-1), C O’Hara (0-1, ’45); Ciaran Stanley (0-1).	Report	D McElroy (0-2 frees), P Donnelly (0-2, 0-1 mark, 0-1 free), T Geehan (0-1), J Daly (0-1).

== All-Britain Club Football Championship ==
=== Britain quarter-finals ===
21 October 2023 Quarter-final	John Mitchels (Lancashire)	0-11 - 2-7	Wandsworth Gaels (London)	Páirc na hÉireann

21 October 2023 Quarter-final	Hugh O'Neills (Yorkshire)	0-7 - 2-16	Glaschu Gaels (Scotland)	Páirc na hÉireann

22 October 2023 Quarter-final	Éire Óg (Hertfordshire)	0-6 - 5-16	Sean McDermott's (Warwickshire)	Horspath GAA Pitch

=== Britain semi-finals ===
4 November 2023 Semi-final	Glaschu Gaels (Scotland)	0-7 - 1-9	Wandsworth Gaels (London)	Páirc na hÉireann

4 November 2023 Semi-final	St Jude's (Gloucestershire)	0-1 - 0-19	Sean McDermott's (Warwickshire)

=== Britain final ===
18 November 2023 Final	Wandsworth Gaels (London)	2-7 - 0-6	Sean McDermott's (Warwickshire)	Páirc na hÉireann
	D Looby (1-3, 2f), C Mulgrew (1-2), S Mullooly (0-1), E O’Connell (0-1)	Report	N Gilbride (0-4, 1 ‘45), D O’Brien (0-1), L Gilbride (0-1)	Referee: M McManamon (Hertfordshire)

== All-Ireland Junior Club Football Championship ==
=== All-Ireland quarter-final ===
9 December 2023 Quarter-final	Arva (Cavan)	2-08 - 1-03	Wandsworth Gaels (London)	Kingspan Breffni Park
	B Donnelly (1-2), C Madden (1-0), C Sheridan (0-3), C Stanley (0-2), T Noach-Hoffman (0-1).	Report

=== All-Ireland semi-finals ===
6 January 2024 Semi-final	Arva (Cavan)	2-16 - 1-07	Milltown (Kildare)	The Downs GAA Grounds
	K Bouchier (0-7, 5f); B Donnelly (1-2); P Finnegan (1-0); J McCabe (0-3); S Sheridan (0-1); T Noack-Hofmann (0-1, 1f); P Morris (0-1); P Cassidy (0-1).	Report	R O’Shea (1-0); K Byrne (0-2); P Donohoe (0-2, 1f); A Dignam (0-1, 1f); C Sheerin (0-1, 1f); A Jacob (0-1).	Referee: S Lonergan (Tipperary)

6 January 2024 Semi-final	Listowel Emmets (Kerry)	1-11 - 0-03	Lahardane McHales (Mayo)	Glenisk O'Connor Park
	D Keane (0-5, 4fs), B Sweeney (1-1), C Mulvihill (0-3), D Lynch (0-1f), E Healy (0-1).	Report	James Maughan (0-1f), D Walsh (0-1f), A Leonard (0-1).	Referee: K Faloon (Armagh)

=== Final ===
14 January 2024 Final	Arva (Cavan)	0-13 - 0-10	Listowel Emmets (Kerry)	Croke Park
	K Bouchier (3 frees), C Brady (0-4 each); P Morris (0-3); T Noack Hofmann (0-2).	Report	D Keane (0-3, 3 frees); C Mulvihill, S Keane (1 free)(0-2 each); N Collins, E Healy, S Tarrant (1 free)(0-1 each).	Referee: A Nolan (Wicklow)

== Championship statistics ==
=== Top scorers ===
Overall

Rank	Player	County	Tally	Total	Matches	Average
1	Kevin Bouchier	Arva	1-26	29	5	5.80
2	Philip Donnelly	Blackhill	4-09	21	3	7.00
2	Conor Sheridan	Glyde Rangers	3-12	21	4	5.25
4	David Keane	Listowel Emmets	2-13	19	4	4.75
5	Damien McCaul	Annanough	2-11	17	2	8.50
6	Aaron McCarney	Fintona Pearses	0-16	16	3	5.33
7	Aaron Mullen	Owenmore Gaels	0-15	15	2	7.50
8	Seán Warren	Kilmurry	1-11	14	3	4.66
9	Liam Wall	Kilmurry	3-04	13	3	4.33
9	Patrick Donohoe	Milltown	0-13	13	4	3.25

Single game

Rank	Player	Club	Tally	Total	Opposition
1	Philip Donnelly	Blackhill	2-04	10	Fintona Pearses
1	Seán Warren	Kilmurry	1-07	10	Seán Treacys
3	Philip Donnelly	Blackhill	2-03	9	St Mary's, Rasharkin
3	Dave Keane	Listowel Emmets	2-03	9	Killimer
3	Damien McCaul	Annanough	1-06	9	Killimer
3	Éamonn McNeill	St Mary's, Rasharkin	1-06	9	Blackhill
7	Liam Wall	Kilmurry	2-02	8	Seán Treacys
7	Pádraig Berhanu	Kilmurry	2-02	8	Feenagh–Kilmeedy
7	Damien McCaul	Annanough	1-05	8	Glyde Rangers
7	Aaron Mullen	Owenmore Gaels	0-08	8	Glenfarne-Kiltyclogher
