= All-Britain Club Football Championship =

Men's Gaelic football provincial club competition

- Current season or competition: 2026 All-Britain Club Football Championship
- Irish: Craobh Peile Uile-Bhreatain na gClub
- Code: Gaelic football
- Founded: 1967; 59 years ago
- Region: Britain (GAA)
- Trophy: All-Britain Championship Cup
- No. of teams: 7
- Title holders: Sean McDermotts (4th title)
- Most titles: Tír Chonaill Gaels (London) (9 titles)
- TV partner: 247.tv
- Official website: Gaelic Games Council of Britain

The All-Britain Club Football Championship is the Gaelic football provincial club championship competition in Great Britain. The winners of the designated county championship for each British county compete against each other in a knockout format, with the winner declared "All-Britain" champions and qualifying for the All-Ireland Junior Club Football Championship. The competition is organised by the Provincial Council of Britain of the Gaelic Athletic Association.

== History ==
While the Provincial Council of Britain was established in 1926 by the GAA Central Council, the first Gaelic games club was established over 30 years earlier in Wallsend. By 1901, clubs had been established in a number of cities with high Irish migrant populations, including London, Glasgow, Manchester, and Liverpool. By the 1910s, football and hurling were being played all over Britain, and clubs had emerged in the Welsh Valleys, Lanarkshire, and Warwickshire.

The earliest recorded All-Britain champion was St Mary's, London, in 1964. In the 1975-76 season, the British champion entered the All-Ireland Senior Club Football Championship for the first time, with Sean McDermotts of Warwickshire facing off against eventual runners-up Roscommon Gaels. To date, no British team has won a game in a All-Ireland Senior Club Football Championship match. However, in the 2004-05 season, the introduction of the All-Ireland Intermediate and Junior Club Football Championships opened up opportunities for British teams, with two final appearance for John Mitchels in 2009 and 2015 and victories for St Peters and Dunedin Connollys (in 2010-11 and 2019-20 respectively).

== Teams ==
The winning teams from the top championships in each county of Britain compete in the Championship. The exception is London- the London Senior Football Championship competes in the Connacht Senior Football Championship, and the winners of the London Intermediate Football Championship and London Junior Football Championship play in a play-off to qualify for the All-Britain.

County	Championship
Gloucestershire	Gloucestershire Football Championship
Hertfordshire	Hertfordshire Football Championship
Lancashire	Lancashire Senior Football Championship
London	London Intermediate Football Championship/London Junior Football Championship
Scotland	Scottish Senior Football Championship
Warwickshire	Warwickshire Senior Football Championship
Yorkshire	Gloucestershire Football Championship

== Roll of honour ==
=== Winners by year ===
- 1964 St Marys
- 1965 Round Towers
- 1966 St Marys
- 1967 Parnells
- 1968 Parnells
- 1969 St Marys
- 1970 Garryowen
- 1971 Sean Treacys
- 1972 Sean McDermotts
- 1973 Sean McDermotts
- 1974 De La Salle College
- 1975 Sean McDermotts
- 1976 Kingdom
- 1977 Kingdom
- 1978 Kingdom
- 1979 Kingdom
- 1980 Tara
- 1981 Parnells
- 1982 Hugh O'Neills
- 1983 Tír Chonaill Gaels
- 1984 Parnells
- 1985 Kingdom
- 1986 Kingdom
- 1987 Kingdom
- 1988 John Mitchels, Birmingham
- 1989 Kingdom
- 1990 Tír Chonaill Gaels
- 1991 Parnells
- 1992 Tír Chonaill Gaels
- 1993 Tír Chonaill Gaels
- 1994 Oisín
- 1995 Tara
- 1996 Tír Chonaill Gaels
- 1997 Tír Chonaill Gaels
- 1998 Tír Chonaill Gaels
- 1999 Hugh O'Neills
- 2000 Tír Chonaill Gaels
- 2001 Tír Chonaill Gaels
- 2002 St Brendans, London
- 2003 Tara
- 2004 St Peters
- 2005 Harlesden Harps
- 2006 Fulham Irish
- 2007 John Mitchels, Liverpool
- 2008 John Mitchels, Liverpool
- 2009 Dunedin Connollys
- 2010 St Peters
- 2011 Cú Chulainns, Newcastle
- 2012 St Peters
- 2013 John Mitchels, Liverpool
- 2014 John Mitchels, Liverpool
- 2015 John Mitchels, Liverpool
- 2016 Dunedin Connollys
- 2017 Dunedin Connollys
- 2018 Dunedin Connollys
- 2019 Thomas MacCurtains
- 2020 not played
- 2021 St Brendans, Manchester
- 2022 Glaschu Gaels
- 2023 Wandsworth Gaels
- 2024 Tara
- 2025 Tara
- 2026 Sean McDermotts

=== Winners by club ===
Team	Location	County	Wins
Tír Chonaill Gaels	West London	London	9
Kingdom	North London	London	8
Tara	West London	London	6
John Mitchels	Liverpool	Lancashire	5
Parnells	Northwest London	London	5
Dunedin Connollys	Edinburgh	Scotland	4
Sean McDermotts	Solihull	Warwickshire	4
St Marys (Naomh Muire)	West London	London	3
St Peters	Manchester	Lancashire	3
Hugh O'Neills	Leeds	Yorkshire	2
Cú Chulainns	Newcastle-upon-Tyne	Yorkshire	1
De La Salle College	Salford	Lancashire	1
Fulham Irish	West London	London	1
Garryowen	Northwest London	London	1
Glaschu Gaels	Glasgow	Scotland	1
Harlesden Harps	West London	London	1
John Mitchels	Birmingham	Warwickshire	1
Oisín	Manchester	Lancashire	1
Round Towers	South London	London	1
Sean Treacys	Southwest London	London	1
St Brendans	West London	London	1
St Brendans	Manchester	Lancashire	1
Thomas McCurtains	East London	London	1
Wandsworth Gaels	Southwest London	London	1

=== Winners by county ===
County	County wins
London	39
Lancashire	11
Scotland	5
Warwickshire	5
Yorkshire	3
Gloucestershire	0
Hertfordshire	0

== Participating teams ==
All-Britain winners are given in gold, with the runners-up in silver.

Year	Gloucestershire	Hertfordshire	Lancashire	London	Scotland	Warwickshire	Yorkshire
2026	Bristol Harps	St Colmcilles	St Brendans	Cú Chulainns	Glaschu Gaels	Sean McDermotts	St Vincents
2025	Bristol Harps	St Josephs	St Brendans	Tara	Dunedin Connollys	Sean McDermotts	Hugh O'Neills
2024	St Judes	St Josephs	John Mitchels	Tara	Dunedin Connollys	Roger Casements	Hugh O'Neills
2023	St Judes	Éire Óg	John Mitchels	Wandsworth Gaels	Glaschu Gaels	Sean McDermotts	Hugh O'Neills
2022	St Judes	Éire Óg	St Brendans	Wandsworth Gaels	Glaschu Gaels	Roger Casements	Brothers Pearse
2021	St Judes	St Josephs	St Brendans	St Clarets	Dunedin Connollys	Sean McDermotts	St Vincents
2020	cancelled due to COVID-19 pandemic						
2019	St Judes	Éire Óg	Oisín	Thomas McCurtains	Glaschu Gaels	Sean McDermotts	Hugh O'Neills
2018	St Judes	Éire Óg	Oisín	Neasden Gaels	Dunedin Connollys	Sean McDermotts	Cú Chulainns
2017	St Nicholas	St Colmcilles	Oisín	Thomas McCurtains	Dunedin Connollys	Sean McDermotts	Hugh O'Neills
2016	Western Gaels	St Colmcilles	John Mitchels	Neasden Gaels	Dunedin Connollys	Sean McDermotts	St Benedicts Harps
2015	Western Gaels	Glen Rovers	John Mitchels	Garryowen	Dunedin Connollys	Sean McDermotts	Hugh O'Neills
2014	St Colmcilles	Éire Óg	John Mitchels	North London Shamrocks	Dunedin Connollys	Sean McDermotts	Cú Chulainns
2013	St Nicholas	Glen Rovers	John Mitchels	Heston Gaels	Dunedin Connollys	John Mitchels	Cú Chulainns
2012	St Colmcilles	unknown	St Peters	Cú Chulainns	Tír Conaill Harps	did not enter	Cú Chulainns
2011	St Nicholas	Glen Rovers	John Mitchels	Round Towers	Dunedin Connollys	St Barnabas	Cú Chulainns
2010	Western Gaels	Glen Rovers	St Peters	Moindearg	Dunedin Connollys	Sean McDermotts	Cú Chulainns
2009	St Colmcilles	Cambridge Parnells	John Mitchels	St Kiernans	Dunedin Connollys	Sean McDermotts	Cú Chulainns
2008	St Colmcilles	St Dympnas	John Mitchels	Tara	Dunedin Connollys	Sean McDermotts	Cú Chulainns
2007	St Colmcilles	Cambridge Parnells	John Mitchels	Thomas McCurtains	Dunedin Connollys	Sean McDermotts	Young Irelands

== List of finals ==
Year	Winner		Score		Runner-up		Venue	Source
Year	County	Club	Score		Club	County	Venue	Source
2026	WAR	Sean McDermotts	1-17	1-7	Glaschu Gaels	SCO	Broughton Park, Manchester	
2025	LON	Tara	3-12	1-13	Sean McDermotts	WAR	Páirc na nÉireann, Solihull	
2024	LON	Tara	3-4	1-7	Roger Casements	WAR	McGovern Park, Ruislip	
2023	LON	Wandsworth Gaels	2-7	0-6	Sean McDermotts	WAR	Páirc na nÉireann, Solihull	
2022	SCO	Glaschu Gaels	1-9	0-7	St Brendans	LAN	Old Bedians, Didsbury	
2021	LAN	St Brendans	2-10	2-8	Sean McDermotts	WAR	McGovern Park, Ruislip	
2020	cancelled due to COVID-19 pandemic							
2019	LON	Thomas McCurtains	1-11	0-7	Glaschu Gaels	SCO	Páirc Beeston, Leeds	
2018	SCO	Dunedin Connollys	3-12	2-12	Neasden Gaels	LON	Old Bedians, Didsbury	
2017	SCO	Dunedin Connollys	1-17	1-12	Sean McDermotts	WAR	Páirc Beeston, Leeds	
2016	SCO	Dunedin Connollys	1-19	2-14	John Mitchels	LAN	Old Bedians, Didsbury	
2015	LAN	John Mitchels	2-8	0-8	Sean McDermotts	WAR		
2014	LAN	John Mitchels	4-12	3-11	North London Shamrocks	LON	Páirc na nÉireann, Solihull	
2013	LAN	John Mitchels	2-15	1-11	Dunedin Connollys	SCO		
2012	LAN	St Peters	2-17	1-3	St Colmcilles	GLO		
2011	YOR	Cú Chulainns	1-6	0-6	John Mitchels	LAN		
2010	LAN	St Peters	3-12	2-4	Sean McDermotts	WAR	Old Bedians, Didsbury	
2009	SCO	Dunedin Connollys	1-8	2-4	John Mitchels	LAN		
2008	LAN	John Mitchels	1-9	1-4	Tara	LON		
2007	LAN	John Mitchels	2-10	0-7	Thomas McCurtains	LON		
2006	LON	Fulham Irish	1-11	0-11	Oisín	LAN	Páirc na nÉireann, Solihull	
2005	LON	Harlesden Harps	1-11	0-11	Dunedin Connollys	SCO	Old Bedians, Didsbury	
2004	LAN	St Peters	1-16	3-9	Dunedin Connollys	SCO	Páirc Beeston, Leeds	
2003	LON	Tara	2-8	0-9	Sean McDermotts	WAR	Páirc na nÉireann, Solihull	
2002	LON	St Brendans	2-15	0-9	Sean McDermotts	WAR		
2001	LON	Tír Chonaill Gaels	0-10	0-8	St Peters	LAN	Páirc na nÉireann, Solihull	
2000	LON	Tír Chonaill Gaels	2-12	1-4	St Brendans	WAR		
1999	YOR	Hugh O'Neills	1–11	0–4	Sean McDermotts	WAR		
