= 2026–27 All-Ireland Junior Club Football Championship =

Gaelic football competition

- Dates: 11 October 2026 - 10 January 2027
- Teams: 40
- Sponsor: Allied Irish Bank

Provincial Champions

The 2026–27 All-Ireland Junior Club Football Championship is the 25th staging of the All-Ireland Junior Club Football Championship since its establishment by the Gaelic Athletic Association for the 2001–02 season. The All-Ireland final will be played at Croke Park in Dublin.

== Connacht Junior Club Football Championship ==
=== Teams ===
County	Championship	Team
Galway	Galway Primary Junior Football Championship	Headford
Leitrim	Leitrim Junior A Football Championship	Aughnasheelin
Mayo	Mayo Premier Junior A Football Championship	Ardagh
Roscommon	Roscommon Junior A Football Championship	St Aidan's
Sligo	Sligo Junior Football Championship	Owenmore Gaels

=== Connacht quarter-final ===
7 November 2026 Quarter-final	St Aidan's (Roscommon)	0-10 - 2-10	Ardagh (Mayo)	MacHale Park
		Report		Referee: Michael McGirl (Leitrim)

=== Connacht semi-finals ===
21 November 2026 Semi-final	Ardagh (Mayo)	6-12 - 1-8	Aughnasheelin (Leitrim)	MacHale Park
		Report

21 November 2026 Semi-final	Headford (Galway)	1-18 - 2-11	Owenmore Gaels (Sligo)	Markievicz Park

=== Connacht final ===
Final	Ardagh (Mayo)	v	Headford (Galway)

== Leinster Junior Club Football Championship ==
=== Teams ===
County	Championship	Team
Carlow	Carlow Junior A Football Championship	O'Hanrahans
Dublin	Dublin Junior A Football Championship	Beann Éadair
Europe	European Senior Football Championship	Barcelona Gaels
Kildare	Kildare Junior Football Championship	St Kevin's
Kilkenny	Kilkenny Intermediate Football Championship	Muckalee
Laois	Laois Junior Football Championship	Timahoe
Longford	Longford Junior Football Championship	Ballymore
Louth	Louth Junior Football Championship	Naomh Fionnbarra
Meath	Meath Junior Football Championship	Curraha
Offaly	Offaly Junior Football Championship	St Brigid's
Westmeath	Westmeath Junior Football Championship	St Joseph's
Wexford	Wexford Intermediate A Football Championship	Oylegate-Glenbrien
Wicklow	Wicklow Junior Football Championship	Ballinacor

=== Leinster first round ===
30 October 2026 Preliminary round	Timahoe (Laois)	2-4 - 1-20	St Brigid's (Offaly)	O'Moore Park
		Report		Referee: Ryan Moran (Kildare)

Preliminary round	Curraha (Meath)	did not play	Ballymore (Longford)
Note: Curraha awarded win

31 October 2026 Preliminary round	St Kevin's (Kildare)	4-20 - 2-10	Muckalee (Kilkenny)	Manguard Park
		Report		Referee: Lar Murphy (Carlow)

31 October 2026 Preliminary round	Oylegate-Glenbrien (Wexford)	5-10 - 0-7	Beann Éadair (Dublin)	Chadwicks Wexford Park
		Report		Referee: Ciaran McManus (Laois)

31 October 2026 Preliminary round	Naomh Fionnbarra (Louth)	1-15 - 0-10	Barcelona Gaels (Europe)	Pairc Mhuire Ardee
		Report		Referee: Andrew Smith (Meath)

=== Leinster quarter-finals ===
14 November 2026 Quarter-final	Oylegate-Glenbrien (Wexford)	2-16 - 1-7	O'Hanrahans (Carlow)	St Patrick's Park
		Report		Referee: Stephen Fagan (Wicklow)

14 November 2026 Quarter-final	Curraha (Meath)	5-12 - 3-8	St Joseph's (Westmeath)	Skryne
		Report		Referee: Craig McKeown (Dublin)

14 November 2026 Quarter-final	St Brigid's (Offaly)	2-12 - 1-11	St Kevin's (Kildare)	Daingean
		Report		Referee: Enda Kelly (Westmeath)

14 November 2026 Quarter-final	Ballinacor (Wicklow)	0-12 - 1-12	Naomh Fionnbarra (Louth)	Aughrim County Ground
		Report		Referee: Paddy McDermott (Kildare)

=== Leinster semi-finals ===
28 November 2026 Semi-final	Oylegate-Glenbrien (Wexford)	v	St Brigid's (Offaly)	Chadwicks Wexford Park
				Referee: Enda Kelly (Westmeath)

28 November 2026 Semi-final	Naomh Fionnbarra (Louth)	v	Curraha (Meath)	Pairc Mhuire Ardee
				Referee: James Foley (Carlow)

=== Leinster final ===
12/13 December 2026 Final	SF1 Winner (Leinster)	v	SF2 Winner (Leinster)

== Munster Junior Club Football Championship ==
=== Teams ===
County	Championship	Team
Clare	Clare Junior A Football Championship	Parteen-Meelick
Cork	Cork Premier Junior Football Championship	Canovee
Kerry	Kerry Premier Junior Football Championship	Keel
Limerick	Limerick Junior Football Championship	Athea
Tipperary	Tipperary Junior Football Championship	Mullinahone
Waterford	Waterford Intermediate Football Championship	Shamrocks

=== Munster quarter-finals ===
7 November 2026 Quarter-final	Parteen-Meelick (Clare)	0-6 - 2-18	Canovee (Cork)	Meelick
		Report		Referee: Jack Bray (Waterford)

7 November 2026 Quarter-final	Athea (Limerick)	0-12 - 1-13	Mullinahone (Tipperary)	Athea
		Report		Referee: Eoin Keane (Clare)

=== Munster semi-finals ===
21 November 2026 Semi-final	Keel (Kerry)	3-25 - 0-5	Shamrocks (Waterford)	Keel
		Report		Referee: Brian Crowley (Cork)

21 November 2026 Semi-final	Canovee (Cork)	0-13 - 1-7	Mullinahone (Tipperary)	Cloneen
		Report		Referee: Gary Twomey (Clare)

=== Munster final ===
5 December 2026 Final	Keel (Kerry)	v	Canovee (Cork)

== Ulster Junior Club Football Championship ==
=== Teams ===
County	Championship	Team
Antrim	Antrim Junior Football Championship	St Mary's Rasharkin
Armagh	Armagh Junior Football Championship	Ballyhegan
Cavan	Cavan Junior Football Championship	Lacken
Derry	Derry Junior Football Championship	Doire Trasna
Donegal	Donegal Junior Football Championship	Urris
Down	Down Junior Football Championship	Kilclief
Fermanagh	Fermanagh Junior Football Championship	Newtownbutler First Fermanaghs
Monaghan	Monaghan Junior Football Championship	Drumhowan
Tyrone	Tyrone Junior Football Championship	Fintona Pearses

=== Ulster preliminary round ===
31 October 2026 Preliminary round	Doire Trasna (Derry)	1-5 - 2-14	Lacken (Cavan)	Celtic Park
		Report		Referee: Ryan Walsh (Donegal)

=== Ulster quarter-finals ===
1 November 2026 Quarter-final	Kilclief (Down)	0-7 - 2-18	Newtownbutler First Fermanaghs (Fermanagh)	Páirc Tomás Ruséil
		Report		Referee: Thomas Devlin (Derry)

1 November 2026 Quarter-final	Drumhowan (Monaghan)	4-14 - 2-12	St Mary's Rasharkin (Antrim)	St Tiernach's Park, Clones
		Report		Referee: Mark Turley (Down)

1 November 2026 Quarter-final	Fintona Pearses (Tyrone)	3-16 - 1-5	Urris (Donegal)	Healy Park
		Report		Referee: Cianan Canney (Derry)

8 November 2026 Quarter-final	Ballyhegan (Armagh)	0-12 - 1-14	Lacken (Cavan)	Breffni Park
		Report		Referee: Cathal Boland (Westmeath)

=== Ulster semi-finals ===
14 November 2026 Semi-final	Newtownbutler First Fermanaghs (Fermanagh)	3-10 - 1-22	Drumhowan (Monaghan)	Breffni Park
		Report		Referee: Mark Dorrian (Donegal)

14 November 2026 Semi-final	Fintona Pearses (Tyrone)	0-17 - 0-13	Lacken (Cavan)	Shamrock Park
		Report		Referee: Christopher Brady (Monaghan)

=== Ulster final ===
21 November 2026 Final	Drumhowan (Monaghan)	0-13 - 0-9	Fintona Pearses (Tyrone)	Shamrock Park
		Report		Referee: Enda Mallon (Armagh)

== All-Britain Club Football Championship ==
County	Championship	Team
Gloucestershire	Gloucestershire Football Championship	Bristol Harps
Hertfordshire	Hertfordshire Football Championship	St Colmcille's
Lancashire	Lancashire Senior Football Championship	St Brendan's
London	London Intermediate Football Championship/London Junior Football Championship	Cú Chulainns
Scotland	Scottish Senior Football Championship	Glasgow Gaels
Warwickshire	Warwickshire Senior Football Championship	Sean McDermott's
Yorkshire	Yorkshire Football Championship	St Vincent's

=== Britain preliminary round ===
11 October 2026 Preliminary round robin	St Vincent's (Yorkshire)	2-5 - 3-12	Bristol Harps (Gloucestershire)	Páirc Beeston
				Referee: Barry McGeehan (Lancashire)

17 October 2026 Preliminary round robin	Bristol Harps (Gloucestershire)	2-9 - 0-15	St Colmcille's (Hertfordshire)	Trench Lane
				Referee: Liam Fitzpatrick (Warwickshire)

Preliminary round robin	St Colmcille's (Hertfordshire)	did not play	St Vincent's (Yorkshire)
Note: Bristol Harps awarded place in next round

=== Britain quarter-final ===
1 November 2026 Quarter-final	Bristol Harps (Gloucestershire)	0-1 - 3-20	Sean McDermott's (Warwickshire)	Radlett Road
				Referee: Paul Connolly (Hertfordshire)

=== Britain semi-finals ===
8 November 2026 Semi-final	Cú Chulainns (London)	0-8 - 2-5	Glasgow Gaels (Scotland)	Broughton Park
				Referee: Barry McGeehan (Lancashire)

8 November 2026 Semi-final	Sean McDermott's (Warwickshire)	1-20 - 0-9	St Brendan's (Lancashire)	Páirc na hÉireann
				Referee: Ivan Lehane (Yorkshire)

=== Britain final ===
22 November 2026 Final	Glasgow Gaels (Scotland)	1-7 - 1-17	Sean McDermott's (Warwickshire)	Broughton Park
				Referee: Barry McGeehan (Lancashire)

== All-Ireland Junior Club Football Championship ==
=== All-Ireland quarter-final ===
Quarter-final	Sean McDermott's (Warwickshire)	v	Drumhowan (Monaghan)

=== All-Ireland semi-finals ===
2/3 January 2027 Semi-final	Britain/Ulster representatives (Britain/Ulster)	v	Leinster representatives (Leinster)

2/3 January 2027 Semi-final	Connacht representatives (Connacht)	v	Munster representatives (Munster)

=== All-Ireland final ===
9/10 January 2027 Final	SF1 winner (Britain/Ulster/Leinster)	v	SF2 winner (Connacht/Munster)
