= 2016–17 All-Ireland Junior Club Football Championship =

- Sponsor: Allied Irish Bank
- Champions: Glenbeigh-Glencar (1st title); Colin McGillycuddy (captain); Aidan O'Shea (manager)
- Runners-up: Rock St Patrick's; Thomas Bloomer (captain); Adrian Nugent (manager)

The 2016–17 All-Ireland Junior Club Football Championship was the 16th staging of the All-Ireland Junior Club Football Championship since its establishment by the Gaelic Athletic Association.

The All-Ireland final was played on 19 February 2017 at Croke Park in Dublin, between Glenbeigh-Glencar and Rock St Patrick's. Glenbeigh-Glencar won the match by 1–14 to 1–11 to claim their first ever championship title.

== Connacht Junior Club Football Championship ==
=== Connacht final ===
20 November 2016 Final	Louisburgh (Mayo)	2-09 - 0-11	Creggs (Roscommon)	Kiltoom
		Report

== Leinster Junior Club Football Championship ==
=== Leinster final ===
19 November 2016 Final	Rosenallis (Laois)	1-11 - 1-08	Bracknagh (Offaly)	O'Connor Park
		Report

== Munster Junior Club Football Championship ==
=== Munster final ===
4 December 2016 Final	Glenbeigh-Glencar (Kerry)	2-16 - 0-10	Gabriel Rangers (Cork)	Mallow
		Report

== Ulster Junior Club Football Championship ==
=== Ulster final ===
27 November 2016 Final	Rock St Patrick's (Tyrone)	1-12 - 0-14 (aet)	Blackhill (Monaghan)	Pairc Esler
		Report

== All-Britain Club Football Championship ==
=== Britain final ===
13 November 2016 Final	Dunedin Connollys (Scotland)	1-19 - 2-14 (aet)	John Mitchels (Lancashire)	Old Bedians
		Report

== All-Ireland Junior Club Football Championship ==
=== All-Ireland quarter-final ===
3 December 2016 Quarter-final	Dunedin Connollys (Scotland)	1-9 - 1-6	Rosenallis (Laois)	Granton Road

=== All-Ireland semi-finals ===
29 January 2017 Semi-final	Dunedin Connollys (Scotland)	2-6 - 1-18	Rock St Patrick's (Tyrone)	Athletic Grounds

29 January 2017 Semi-final	Louisburgh (Mayo)	0-13 - 4-14	Glenbeigh-Glencar (Kerry)	Cusack Park

=== All-Ireland final ===
19 February 2017 Final	Glenbeigh-Glencar (Kerry)	1-14 - 1-11	Rock St Patrick's (Tyrone)	Croke Park
