= 2019–20 All-Ireland Junior Club Football Championship =

- Sponsor: Allied Irish Bank
- Champions: Na Gaeil (1st title); Eoin Doody (captain); Donal Rooney (manager)
- Runners-up: Rathgarogue-Cushinstown; Matthew Cody (captain); James Bolger (manager)

The 2019–20 All-Ireland Junior Club Football Championship was the 19th staging of the All-Ireland Junior Club Football Championship since its establishment by the Gaelic Athletic Association.

The All-Ireland final was played on 25 January 2020 at Croke Park in Dublin, between Na Gaeil and Rathgarogue-Cushinstown. Na Gaeil won the match by 3-20 to 1-05 to claim their first ever championship title.

== Connacht Junior Club Football Championship ==
=== Connacht final ===
16 November 2019 Connacht final	Kilmaine (Mayo)	5-17 - 0-03	St Michael's (Sligo)	MacHale Park

== Leinster Junior Club Football Championship ==
=== Leinster final ===
7 December 2019 Leinster final	Rathgarogue-Cushinstown (Wexford)	0-13 - 0-12; AET	Clann na nGael (Meath)	Páirc Tailteann

== Munster Junior Club Football Championship ==
=== Munster final ===
8 December 2019 Munster final	Na Gaeil (Kerry)	3-13 - 1-01	Mullinahone (Tipperary)	Mallow

== Ulster Junior Club Football Championship ==
=== Ulster final ===
19 December 2021 Ulster final	Blackhill (Monaghan)	1-11 - 0-09	Buncrana (Donegal)	Healy Park

== All-Britain Club Football Championship ==
=== Britain final ===
19 November 2019 Britain final	Thomas McCurtains (London)	2-10 - 2-08	Glaschu Gaels (Scotland)	Páirc Beeston

== All-Ireland Junior Club Football Championship ==
=== All-Ireland quarter-final ===
8 December 2019 Quarter-final	Thomas McCurtains (London)	0-10 - 2-11	Blackhill (Monaghan)	McGovern Park

=== All-Ireland semi-finals ===
11 January 2020 Semi-final	Rathgarogue-Cushinstown (Wexford)	1-07 - 1-06	Blackhill (Monaghan)	Croke Park

11 January 2020 Semi-final	Na Gaeil (Kerry)	0-13 - 1-09; AET	Kilmaine (Mayo)	Cusack Park

=== All-Ireland final ===
25 January 2020 Final	Na Gaeil (Kerry)	3-20 - 1-05	Rathgarogue-Cushinstown (Wexford)	Croke Park
