= 2021–22 All-Ireland Junior Club Football Championship =

Gaelic football tournament

- Sponsor: Allied Irish Bank
- Champions: Kilmeena (1st title); Seán Ryder (captain); John Reilly (manager)
- Runners-up: Gneeveguilla; Patrick O'Riordan (captain); Seánie O'Leary (manager)

The 2021–22 All-Ireland Junior Club Football Championship was the 20th staging of the All-Ireland Junior Club Football Championship since its establishment by the Gaelic Athletic Association. It was the first club championship to be completed in two years due to the COVID-19 pandemic.

The All-Ireland final was played on 6 February 2022 at Croke Park in Dublin, between Kilmeena and Gneeveguilla. Kilmeena won the match by 0-11 to 1-06 to claim their first ever championship title.

== Connacht Junior Club Football Championship ==
=== Connacht final ===
8 January 2022 Connacht final	Kilmeena (Mayo)	1-18 - 0-05	St Patrick's (Sligo)	Markievicz Park

== Leinster Junior Club Football Championship ==
=== Leinster final ===
15 January 2022 Leinster final	Clonbullogue (Offaly)	5-03 - 1-10	Kilcullen (Kildare)	St Conleth's Park

== Munster Junior Club Football Championship ==
=== Munster final ===
15 January 2022 Munster final	Gneeveguilla (Kerry)	4-18 - 1-06	Ballina (Tipperary)	Mallow

== Ulster Junior Club Football Championship ==
=== Ulster final ===
19 December 2021 Ulster final	Denn (Cavan)	3-08 - 1-10	Na Dúnaibh (Donegal)	St Tiernach's Park, Clones

== All-Britain Club Football Championship ==
=== Britain final ===
7 November 2021 Britain final	St Brendan's (Lancashire)	2-10 - 2-08	Seán McDermott's (Warwickshire)	McGovern Park

== All-Ireland Junior Club Football Championship ==
=== All-Ireland quarter-final ===
16 January 2022 Quarter-final	Denn (Cavan)	3-16 - 2-06	St Brendan's (Lancashire)	St Oliver Plunkett Park
	TE Donohoe (0-7, 4f), B Conaty (0-6, 1f), C McCabe (1-0), S Donohoe (1-0), J Reilly (1-0), C O’Reilly (0-1), C Smyth (0-1), C McCann (0-1f)	Report	C Conway (1-2), Paddy McCoy (1-1), Ryan Devine (0-1), Aaron Fitzpatrick (0-1)	Referee: B Tiernan (Dublin)

=== All-Ireland semi-final ===
29 January 2022 Semi-final	Kilmeena (Mayo)	1-18 - 0-06	Clonbullogue (Offaly)	Glennon Brothers Pearse Park

29 January 2022 Semi-final	Gneeveguilla (Kerry)	1-18 - 0-06	Denn (Cavan)	Bord na Móna O'Connor Park

=== All-Ireland final ===
6 February 2022 Final	Kilmeena (Mayo)	0-11 - 1-06 (aet)	Gneeveguilla (Kerry)	Croke Park
	D Keaveney (0-6, 0-4f), J Smyth (0-2), S Ryder (0-1), J McGlynn (0-1), N Duffy (0-1)	Report	P Doyle (1-0), J O’Leary (0-2, 0-1f), S O’Sullivan (mark), C Buckley (f), S O’Keeffe (0-1), P Warren (0-1)	Referee: S Mulhare (Laois)
