= Dunsany GAA =

Gaelic sports club in County Meath, Ireland

Dunsany
- Dhún Samhnaí
- Founded: 1963
- County: Meath
- Colours
- Grounds: Páirc na nGael

Playing kits
Standard colours

Senior Club Championships
	All Ireland	Leinster champions	Meath champions
Football:	0	0	0

Dunsany GAA is a Gaelic Athletic Association club in Dunsany, County Meath, Ireland. The club is affiliated to the Meath County Board and fields teams primarily in Gaelic football.

== History ==
Located in the village of Dunsany, around 7km from Dunshaughlin, Dunsany GAA was founded in 1963. Dunsany's first final was against Ballinabrackey in the Meath JFC in 1972, where they were defeated 0-11 to 2-02. As Dunsany were runners-up they were promoted to the Meath IFC, where they stayed until being relegated in 1994, where they made it fartherest at the quarter-final stage in 1979. Between 1980 and 2024, Dunsany lost 8 Meath JFC finals:

- 2002: Nobber 1-15 Dunsany 2-07
- 2004: Ratoath 1-08 Dunsany 0-06
- 2009: Longwood 1-10 Dunsany 0-07
- 2015: Curraha 2-12 Dunsany 2-11
- 2016: Bective 0-15 Dunsany 0-12
- 2021: St Vincent's 1-04 Dunsany 0-06
- 2022: Castletown 1-12 Dunsany 0-11

Dunsany won the Meath JFC against St Vincent's 1-05 to 0-07, winning their first championship trophy. Dunsany were beaten by Ballinagar in the Leinster Junior Club Football Championship final 2-09 to 0-08.

== Honours ==
- Meath Junior 'A' Football Championship (1): 2024 (runners-up in 1972, 2002, 2004, 2009, 2015, 2016, 2021, 2022)
- Leinster Junior Club Football Championship (0): (runners-up in 2024)

Preceded by Kilbride	Meath Junior Football Champions; 2024	Succeeded by Clann na nGael
