= All-Ireland Junior Club Football Championship =

Annual Gaelic football competition

- Current season or competition: 2026–27 All-Ireland Junior Club Football Championship
- Irish: Craobh Shóisireach Peile Chlub na hÉireann
- Code: Gaelic football
- Founded: 2001–2002; 24 years ago
- Region: Ireland and Great Britain (GAA)
- No. of teams: 5
- Title holders: Ballymacelligott (1st title)
- Most titles: No club has won more than once
- Sponsors: Allied Irish Banks (AIB)
- TV partner: TG4

The All-Ireland Junior Club Football Championship (known for sponsorship reasons as the AIB All-Ireland GAA Football Junior Club Championship, or as the All-Ireland Club JFC for short) is an annual Gaelic football competition organised by the GAA.

It is played between the Junior championship winners from each of the thirty-two counties of Ireland. Each team competes in their own provincial championship, with the four provincial winners competing in the All-Ireland, joined by the winners of the All-Britain Club Football Championship. The competition has a straight knock-out format. It was first held in 2002 as an unofficial tournament, and has been an official GAA championship since the 2004–05 edition.

Kerry clubs have had the most success, winning the competition eleven times. No club has won the championship more than once. The current champions are Ballymacelligott from Kerry.

== Teams ==
=== Qualification ===
| Province | Championship | Qualifying Team |
|---|---|---|
| Britain | All-Britain Club Football Championship | Champions |
| Connacht | Connacht Junior Club Football Championship | Champions |
| Leinster | Leinster Junior Club Football Championship | Champions |
| Munster | Munster Junior Club Football Championship | Champions |
| Ulster | Ulster Junior Club Football Championship | Champions |

== List of finals ==
List of All-Ireland Junior Club Football Championship finals
| Year | Winners | | Score | Runners-up | | Venue | Ref. |
| Year | County | Club | Score | County | Club | Venue | Ref. |
|---|---|---|---|---|---|---|---|
| 2001–02 (Note: Unofficial tournament) | Cavan | Drumgoon | 1–14 – 0–12 | Mayo | Belmullet | Shamrock Park, Cremartin | |
| 2002–03 | Meath | Nobber | 2–13 – 1–13 | Mayo | Kilmeena | Shamrock Park, Cremartin | |
| 2003–04 | Meath | Wolfe Tones | 0–14 – 0–10 | Cork | Carbery Rangers | Shamrock Park, Cremartin | |
| 2004–05 | Kerry | Finuge | 1–14 – 0–06 | Tyrone | Stewartstown Harps | O'Moore Park, Portlaoise | |
| 2005–06 | Kerry | Ardfert | 1–07 – 0–09 | Galway | Loughrea | Croke Park, Dublin | |
| 2006–07 | Tyrone | Greencastle | 0–13 – 0–12 | Kerry | Duagh | Croke Park, Dublin | |
| 2007–08 | Cork | Canovee | 1–08 – 0–05 | Tyrone | Rock St Patrick's | Croke Park, Dublin | |
| 2008–09 | Kerry | Skellig Rangers | 0–10 – 0–09 | Lancashire | John Mitchels | Croke Park, Dublin | |
| 2009–10 | Kerry | Castlegregory | 1–14 – 0–15 | Mayo | Kiltimagh | Croke Park, Dublin | |
| 2010–11 | Kerry | St Mary's | 3–13 – 1–05 | Cavan | Swanlinbar | Croke Park, Dublin | |
| 2011–12 | Galway | Clonbur | 1–08 – 1–07 | Tyrone | Derrytresk | Croke Park, Dublin | |
| 2012–13 | Galway | Ballinasloe | 0–14 – 0–10 | Kerry | Kenmare Shamrocks | Croke Park, Dublin | |
| 2013–14 | Kildare | Two Mile House | 5–07 – 1–11 | Roscommon | Fuerty | Croke Park, Dublin | |
| 2014–15 | Kerry | Brosna | 0–08 – 0–05 | Lancashire | John Mitchels | Croke Park, Dublin | |
| 2015–16 | Kerry | Templenoe | 4–13 – 1–10 | Mayo | Ardnaree Sarsfields | Croke Park, Dublin | |
| 2016–17 | Kerry | Glenbeigh-Glencar | 1–14 – 1–11 | Tyrone | Rock St Patrick's | Croke Park, Dublin | |
| 2017–18 | Cork | Knocknagree | 3–13 – 3–09 | Westmeath | Multyfarnham | Croke Park, Dublin | |
| 2018–19 | Kerry | Beaufort | 3–17 – 0–05 | Sligo | Easkey | Croke Park, Dublin | |
| 2019–20 | Kerry | Na Gaeil | 3–20 – 1–05 | Wexford | Rathgarogue-Cushinstown | Croke Park, Dublin | |
| 2020–21 | Competition cancelled due to COVID-19 pandemic | | | | | | |
| 2021–22 | Mayo | Kilmeena | 0–11 – 1–06 | Kerry | Gneeveguilla | Croke Park, Dublin | |
| 2022–23 | Kerry | Fossa | 0–19 – 1–13 | Tyrone | Stewartstown Harps | Croke Park, Dublin | |
| 2023–24 | Cavan | Arva | 0–13 – 0–10 | Kerry | Listowel Emmets | Croke Park, Dublin | |
| 2024–25 | Galway | An Cheathrú Rua | 0–09 – 0–08 | Donegal | Naomh Pádraig | Croke Park, Dublin | |
| 2025–26 | Kerry | Ballymacelligott | 1–16 – 0–13 | Tyrone | Clogher | Croke Park, Dublin | |

== Performances ==
=== By county ===
Performances in the All-Ireland Junior Club Football Championship by county
| County | Titles | Runners-up | Years won | Years runners-up |
|---|---|---|---|---|
| Kerry | 12 | 4 | 2005, 2006, 2009, 2010, 2011, 2015, 2016, 2017, 2019, 2020, 2023, 2026 | 2007, 2013, 2022, 2024 |
| Galway | 3 | 1 | 2012, 2013, 2025 | 2006 |
| Cavan | 2 | 1 | 2002, 2024 | 2011 |
| Cork | 2 | 1 | 2008, 2018 | 2004 |
| Meath | 2 | 0 | 2003, 2004 | — |
| Tyrone | 1 | 6 | 2007 | 2005, 2008, 2012, 2017, 2023, 2026 |
| Mayo | 1 | 4 | 2022 | 2002, 2003, 2010, 2016 |
| Kildare | 1 | 0 | 2014 | — |
| Lancashire | 0 | 2 | — | 2009, 2015 |
| Roscommon | 0 | 1 | — | 2014 |
| Westmeath | 0 | 1 | — | 2018 |
| Sligo | 0 | 1 | — | 2019 |
| Wexford | 0 | 1 | — | 2020 |
| Donegal | 0 | 1 | — | 2025 |

=== By club ===
Performances in the All-Ireland Junior Club Football Championship by club
| Club | Titles | Runners-up | Years won | Years runners-up |
|---|---|---|---|---|
| Kilmeena | 1 | 1 | 2022 | 2003 |
| Drumgoon | 1 | 0 | 2002 | — |
| Nobber | 1 | 0 | 2003 | — |
| Wolfe Tones | 1 | 0 | 2004 | — |
| Finuge | 1 | 0 | 2005 | — |
| Ardfert | 1 | 0 | 2006 | — |
| Greencastle | 1 | 0 | 2007 | — |
| Canovee | 1 | 0 | 2008 | — |
| Skellig Rangers | 1 | 0 | 2009 | — |
| Castlegregory | 1 | 0 | 2010 | — |
| St Mary's | 1 | 0 | 2011 | — |
| Clonbur | 1 | 0 | 2012 | — |
| Ballinasloe | 1 | 0 | 2013 | — |
| Two Mile House | 1 | 0 | 2014 | — |
| Brosna | 1 | 0 | 2015 | — |
| Templenoe | 1 | 0 | 2016 | — |
| Glenbeigh-Glencar | 1 | 0 | 2017 | — |
| Knocknagree | 1 | 0 | 2018 | — |
| Beaufort | 1 | 0 | 2019 | — |
| Na Gaeil | 1 | 0 | 2020 | — |
| Fossa | 1 | 0 | 2023 | — |
| Arva | 1 | 0 | 2024 | — |
| An Cheathrú Rua | 1 | 0 | 2025 | — |
| Ballymacelligott | 1 | 0 | 2026 | — |
| Stewartstown Harps | 0 | 2 | — | 2005, 2023 |
| Rock St Patrick's | 0 | 2 | — | 2008, 2017 |
| John Mitchels | 0 | 2 | — | 2009, 2015 |
| Belmullet | 0 | 1 | — | 2002 |
| Carbery Rangers | 0 | 1 | — | 2004 |
| Loughrea | 0 | 1 | — | 2006 |
| Duagh | 0 | 1 | — | 2007 |
| Kiltimagh | 0 | 1 | — | 2010 |
| Swanlinbar | 0 | 1 | — | 2011 |
| Derrytresk | 0 | 1 | — | 2012 |
| Kenmare Shamrocks | 0 | 1 | — | 2013 |
| Fuerty | 0 | 1 | — | 2014 |
| Ardnaree Sarsfields | 0 | 1 | — | 2016 |
| Multyfarnham | 0 | 1 | — | 2018 |
| Easkey | 0 | 1 | — | 2019 |
| Rathgarogue-Cushinstown | 0 | 1 | — | 2020 |
| Gneeveguilla | 0 | 1 | — | 2022 |
| Listowel Emmets | 0 | 1 | — | 2024 |
| Naomh Pádraig | 0 | 1 | — | 2025 |
| Clogher | 0 | 1 | — | 2026 |

=== By province ===
Performances in finals by province
| Province | Titles | Runners-up | Total |
|---|---|---|---|
| Munster | 14 | 5 | 19 |
| Connacht | 4 | 7 | 11 |
| Ulster | 3 | 8 | 11 |
| Leinster | 3 | 2 | 5 |
| Britain | 0 | 2 | 2 |

== See also ==
- Connacht Junior Club Football Championship
- Leinster Junior Club Football Championship
- Munster Junior Club Football Championship
- Ulster Junior Club Football Championship
- All-Britain Club Football Championship
- All-Ireland Senior Club Football Championship
- All-Ireland Intermediate Club Football Championship
