= St Joseph's GAA =

St Joseph's GAA may refer to a number of sports clubs including:

- St Joseph's GAA (Laois), in County Laois, Ireland
- St Joseph's GAA Club (Waltham Cross), in Waltham Cross, Hertfordshire, England
- St Joseph's GFC (Louth), in County Louth, Ireland
- St Joseph's Doora-Barefield GAA, near Ennis, County Clare, Ireland
- St Joseph's/OCB GAA, in Dublin, Ireland

== See also ==
- Ederney St Joseph's GAC, a club in County Fermanagh
- Glenelly St Joseph's GAC, a club in County Tyrone
- Milltown Malbay GAA, a club occasionally referred to as St Joseph's
- St Joseph's GFC (Donegal), a defunct club based in County Donegal, Ireland
- St Joseph's Hurling Club, a club in the San Francisco area
