= Raheen GAA =

GAA club in Geashill, County Offaly, Ireland

- Ráithín CLG
- Founded: 1973
- County: Offaly
- Colours: Black and red
- Grounds: Pairc Naomh Mhuire

Playing kits
Standard colours

Raheen GAA (Irish: Cumann Luthchleas Gael Ráithín) is a Gaelic Athletic Association club in the village of Geashill in County Offaly, Ireland. It fields Gaelic football teams from juvenile up to adult levels.

Raheen's Adult football teams compete at Intermediate and Junior B grade. The club's catchment area includes the villages of Geashill and Cloneygowan.

== History ==
The club was founded in 1973 (53 years ago). In 2019, there was an attempt to amalgamate with their neighbours Ballinagar, when Ballinagar GAA and Raheen held discussions on amalgamation. Both EGMs were held with Ballinagar supporting amalgamation but Raheen fell short of the 75% needed for it to pass.

== Juvenile setup ==
At underage level, the club amalgamates with Ballinagar and Clodiagh Gaels to form Na Fianna. Na Fianna provides underage football and hurling for these clubs.

== Honours ==
- Offaly Intermediate Football Championship (2): 1981, 2014

== Notable players ==
- John Guinan
