= 2009–10 All-Ireland Junior Club Football Championship =

- Sponsor: Allied Irish Bank
- Champions: Castlegregory (1st title)
- Runners-up: Kiltimagh

The 2009–10 All-Ireland Junior Club Football Championship was the ninth staging of the All-Ireland Junior Club Football Championship since its establishment by the Gaelic Athletic Association.

The All-Ireland final was played on 14 February 2010 at Croke Park in Dublin, between Castlegregory and Kiltimagh. Castlegregory won the match by 1-14 to 0-15 to claim their first ever championship title.

== All-Ireland Junior Club Football Championship ==
=== All-Ireland final ===
14 February 2010 Final	Castlegregory	1-14 - 0-15 (aet)	Kiltimagh	Croke Park
