= 2002–03 All-Ireland Junior Club Football Championship =

- Sponsor: Allied Irish Bank
- Champions: Nobber (1st title)
- Runners-up: Kilmeena

The 2002–03 All-Ireland Junior Club Football Championship was the second staging of the All-Ireland Junior Club Football Championship since its establishment by the Gaelic Athletic Association.

The All-Ireland final was played on 10 May 2003 at Shamrock Park in Cremartin, between Nobber and Kilmeena. Nobber won the match by 2-13 to 1-13 to claim their first ever championship title.

== All-Ireland Junior Club Football Championship ==
=== All-Ireland final ===
10 May 2003 Final	Nobber	2-13 - 1-13	Kilmeena	Shamrock Park
