= 2012–13 All-Ireland Junior Club Football Championship =

- Sponsor: Allied Irish Bank
- Champions: Ballinasloe (1st title)
- Runners-up: Kenmare Shamrocks

The 2012–13 All-Ireland Junior Club Football Championship was the 12th staging of the All-Ireland Junior Club Football Championship since its establishment by the Gaelic Athletic Association.

The All-Ireland final was played on 24 February 2013 at Croke Park in Dublin, between Ballinasloe and Kenmare Shamrocks. Ballinasloe won the match by 0–14 to 0–10 to claim their first ever championship title.

== All-Ireland Junior Club Football Championship ==
=== All-Ireland final ===
24 February 2013 Final	Ballinasloe	0-14 - 0-10	Kenmare Shamrocks	Croke Park
