= 2005–06 All-Ireland Junior Club Football Championship =

- Sponsor: Allied Irish Bank
- Champions: Ardfert (1st title)
- Runners-up: Loughrea

The 2005–06 All-Ireland Junior Club Football Championship was the fifth staging of the All-Ireland Junior Club Football Championship since its establishment by the Gaelic Athletic Association.

The All-Ireland final was played on 19 February 2006 at Croke Park in Dublin, between Ardfert and Loughrea. Ardfert won the match by 1-07 to 0-09 to claim their first ever championship title.

== All-Ireland Junior Club Football Championship ==
=== All-Ireland final ===
19 February 2006 Final	Ardfert	1-07 - 0-09	Loughrea	Croke Park
				Referee: C Reilly (Meath)
