= 2015–16 All-Ireland Junior Club Football Championship =

- Sponsor: Allied Irish Bank
- Champions: Templenoe (1st title); Tadhg Morley (captain); Mike Crowley (manager)
- Runners-up: Ardnaree Sarsfields; Eoin McCormack (captain); Declan O'Dea (manager)

The 2015–16 All-Ireland Junior Club Football Championship was the 15th staging of the All-Ireland Junior Club Football Championship since its establishment by the Gaelic Athletic Association.

The All-Ireland final was played on 6 February 2016 at Croke Park in Dublin, between Templenoe and Ardnaree Sarsfields. Templenoe won the match by 4-13 to 1-10 to claim their first ever championship title.

== All-Ireland Junior Club Football Championship ==
=== All-Ireland final ===
9 February 2016 Final	Templenoe	4-13 - 1-10	Ardnaree Sarsfields	Croke Park
