= Ballinagore GAA =

Gaelic football club in County Westmeath, Ireland

- Cumann Lúthchleas Gael Béal Átha na nGabhar
- Founded: 1920s
- County: Westmeath
- Colours: Maroon and White
- Grounds: Páirc an Bhodhráin
- Coordinates: 53°24′52.22″N 7°26′47.85″W

Playing kits
Standard colours

Ballinagore GAA (Cumann Lúthchleas Gael Béal Átha na nGabhar) is a Gaelic Athletic Association club in County Westmeath, Ireland. The club is affiliated to the Westmeath county board and plays its home matches at Páirc an Bhodhráin.

== History ==
Ballinagore GAA was formed in the early 1920s, having previously formed part of the Castletown Geoghegan club. They won the Westmeath Junior Football Championship in 1940, defeating Mental Hospital by 1-7 to 0-3 in the final, which was played in Cusack Park. In the same year, Ballinagore also won the Junior League, beating The Downs in the final.

In 1986, the club won the county Junior B Championship final beating Delvin 0-11 to 1-4. That year also saw them win the Junior Championship, the final being played in Cusack Park on 1 October 1986. In the final, Ballinagore defeated Shandonagh 1-9 to 1-0 to bridge a 46-year gap. They then completed a treble by overcoming Delvin in the Junior Cup final, 4-9 to 1-7. As a result of their Junior Championship win, they were promoted to the Westmeath Intermediate Football Championship, but were relegated in 1990.

Ballinagore were soon pushing for promotion again. They reached three successive Junior finals from 1991 to 1993, but lost each one. 1994 saw them in a fourth consecutive final, and this time they were victorious, beating Milltown 1-5 to 0-7 in Athlone. They also retained the league title they had won in 1993 when they beat Milltown 0-9 to 0-8. A Junior treble was completed with a 0-10 to 0-7 win over Ballynacargy in the Junior Cup final.

Ballinagore were relegated from the Intermediate grade in 2004 after a ten-year stay. However, they returned in 2005 to capture the County Junior Championship and County Junior Cup. They then went on to win the Leinster Junior Club Football Championship, becoming the first Westmeath club to win a provincial football championship. Within a few years of their return to intermediate grade, they captured the 2007 Intermediate Championship. They went on to reach the Leinster Intermediate Club Football Championship semi-final, but were beaten 1-8 to 0-10 by Kildare GAA intermediate champions Suncroft, following an injury-time point.

After returning to the junior grades, the club claimed back-to-back county championships. In October 2024, they won the Westmeath Junior 2 Football Championship by defeating Delvin 1-15 to 1-10 at TEG Cusack Park. In June 2025, they added the Westmeath ACFL Division 4 league title following a 0-15 to 1-11 win against Shandonagh. Later that season, on 2 November 2025, Ballinagore won the Westmeath Junior 1 Football Championship, defeating St Joseph's 0-15 to 1-8 in the final at TEG Cusack Park to secure promotion back to the intermediate ranks for 2026.

== Honours ==
- Leinster Junior Club Football Championship (1): 2005
- Westmeath Intermediate Football Championship (1): 2007
- Westmeath Junior 1 Football Championship (5): 1940, 1986, 1994, 2005, 2025
- Westmeath Junior 2 Football Championship (1): 2024
- Westmeath Junior B Football Championship (1): 1986
- Westmeath ACFL Division 4 (1): 2025
