= Cardiff GAA (St. Colmcilles) =

Welsh Gaelic football club

Cardiff GAA (St Colmcilles)
- Naomh Colmcille Caerdydd
- Founded: 1956
- County: Glamorgan
- Colours: Blue and white
- Grounds: Pontcanna Fields, Cardiff

Playing kits
Standard colours

St Colmcilles Cardiff is a GAA club based in Cardiff, Wales that plays Gaelic football and Hurling.

It is affiliated with Gloucestershire GAA and British GAA.

The club serves the Irish and local communities in Cardiff and South Wales. It maintains teams for various skill levels and age groups.

St Colmcilles was established in 1956 as a successor club to the Emmetts, which had ceased to operate in 1915 due to the First World War. St Colmcilles won the league in 1961 and a first county championship in 1967. They won the championship of Great Britain in 1973. However, in 1974, they ceased to operate, only to be revived (with new colours) for football at underage level in 1983. After this, a senior football team was put together, and, later, a camogie team for the ladies. St Colmcilles went on to win county league and championship at every grade, completed by the club's under-14 team winning the 1988 All-Britain.

== History ==
The Emmets were the original GAA club that operated in the Cardiff in the early 1900s, but they folded in 1915 due mainly to the outbreak of the First World War. Following the demise of The Emmets, Cardiff went without a GAA club until 1956 when the current club St Colmcilles was founded. During this time the South Wales County Board collapsed and on the foundation of St Colmcilles in 1956 the club was aligned with the Gloucester County Board. It was initially set up as a hurling club and wore purple and gold, reflecting the large number of Wexford men in the side.

At this time, so that both codes could flourish, there was an arrangement with near neighbours Newport's Pride of Erin that their footballers could hurl for Cardiff and the Cardiff footballers line out for Newport. St Colmcilles soon became a force to be reckoned with, winning the hurling league in 1961 and their first County Hurling Championship in 1967. This proved to be the first of five championships in six years. However, the club fell on hard times following that period of success and folded in 1976 mainly due to the lack of players.

After nearly a decade of inactivity the club again sprang to life again in 1983, initially with underage football teams and a camogie side. A senior football was added as the club grew. It was at this reincarnation the club adopted their current colours of blue and white, following the trend set by the other major sporting clubs in the city.

Success soon followed with a first senior football county title coming in 1989, a year after the under-14 team won the All Britain title in 1988 which remains the club's only top grade provincial title. Following this success the 1990s proved to be a barren decade, with years and inactivity and non-competitiveness.

The late 1990s and early 2000s brought an influx of students who would become Cardiff stalwarts during the next decade. As a result, the club went through a golden period in the first decade of the 21st century. The current senior side have won seven of the last eleven Gloucestershire Senior Football Championships, including an historic four-in-a-row (2000, 2002, 2004, 2006–2009), as well as three from five Gloucestershire Senior Football League titles (2006, 2007, 2010). A renaissance in underage development occurred, with the under-14 footballers winning the British Provincial U14 Plate Championship in 2010. The underage membership of the club is increasing annually thanks to a number of club–school links established in the Cardiff area. Also, the formation of a ladies' football team came about.

== Honours ==
Adult

- Gloucestershire Senior Football: 1989, 2000, 2002, 2004, 2006, 2007, 2008, 2009
- Gloucestershire Senior Hurling: 1967, 1969, 1970, 1971, 1972
- Gloucestershire Senior Camogie: 1992, 1993, 1994
- All Britain LGFA Finalists: 2023

Underage

- All Britain U14 Football Champions: 1988
- All Britain U14 Football Plate: 2010
- Feile U13 Plate: 2010
