= Ardagh GAA =

Gaelic games club in County Mayo, Ireland

- CLG Ard Achadh
- Founded: 1929
- County: Mayo
- Nickname: The Ardagh Machine
- Colours: Green, gold and black
- Grounds: Maughan Park
- Coordinates: 54°07′26″N 9°15′10″W

Playing kits
Standard colours

Senior Club Championships
	All Ireland	Connacht champions	Mayo champions
Football:	0	0	0

Ardagh GAA (Irish: CLG Ard Achadh) is a Gaelic Athletic Association club in Ardagh, County Mayo, Ireland. The club competes in Mayo GAA football competitions, including the Mayo Junior Football Championship.

== History ==
The first record of Ardagh fielding a GAA team was in 1908 when they played Knockmore in a challenge game. There was, however, no official team in Ardagh until 1929. Another team was affiliated in 1944 but, due to emigration, was disbanded in 1946. In the late 1950s and 1960s, Ardagh teams won several local 7-a-side tournaments and some of the players played for Ballina and Crossmolina. In 1974, a new club was formed, named Ardmoy, to represent the parishes of Ardagh and Moygownagh. While operating as separate clubs, they fielded a combined team for championship fixtures.

The club won the Mayo Senior League Division 3 title in 2023.

== Grounds ==
Ardagh play at Maughan Park in Carrowcrin townland, located halfway between Ballina and Crossmolina.

== Colours and playing kit ==
Ardagh's club colours are green, gold and black. The club wore green, gold and black hooped jerseys when it was re-established in 1978. Its adult football team wore a predominantly black kit with green trim and gold stripes during the 2025 season. The club's black O'Neills jersey also features the Ardagh crest and the Fox & Gallagher sponsorship.

== Honours ==
Year	Team	Competition	Honour
1984	Ardagh	Scór na nÓg – Rince Foirne	Winners
1994	Ardagh	Division 4 football league	Winners
1995	Ardagh	Junior Exclusive football competition	Winners
2018	Ardmoy–MacHales	North Mayo Minor B football championship	Winners
2023	Ardagh	Mayo Senior Football League Division 3	Winners
2025	Ardagh	Mayo Senior Football League Division 3	Winners
