= Cambridge Parnells GAA =

Gaelic football club in England

Cambridge Parnells
- Founded: 2006
- County: Hertfordshire
- Nickname: Parnells
- Colours: Sky Blue and White
- Grounds: Coldham's Common
{{{kit1}}}

Cambridge Parnells are a Gaelic football club in the city of Cambridge, England.

== History ==
The club was formed in April 2006 by students at the University of Cambridge. However, the club re-established Gaelic games in the city after the presence of Cambridge Harps, a team that competed up until the late 1980s. Underage teams came through in the 2010s and won county honours but the club is currently made up of just adult teams.

The Men's team compete in the Hertfordshire county, alongside clubs from Watford, St Albans, Luton, Waltham Cross and Oxford, and won County Championships in 2007 and 2009. However, success was not as forthcoming in the following years as firstly Glen Rovers of Watford and then Eire Og of Oxford dominated Hertfordshire football, with Parnells often struggling to field competitive teams. In recent seasons Parnells have been closer to the leading clubs, losing the 2022 Championship Semi Final to Eire Og by a point and falling at the same hurdle in 2023 to St Joseph's Waltham Cross after extra time. After group stage extis in 2024 (on points difference) and 2025, Parnells returned to a semi final in 2026, but lost out to St Colmcilles of St Albans by 5 points.

The team play in Coldham's Common in Cambridge, with a new full-sized pitch opened in 2026. Another development in Gaelic Games in Cambridge in 2026 was the revival of the Varsity Match between the teams from the University of Cambridge and the University of Oxford, which had not been played since the late 2000's.

Cambridge Parnells is the only GAA club in a large area of East Anglia, attracting players from the surrounding region and nearby cities and towns such as Newmarket, Norwich, Ipswich and Peterborough.

== Honours ==
- Hertfordshire Senior Football Championship — 2007, 2009
- Hertfordshire Senior Football League — 2007
- Cahill and Hurley Cup — 2007 (Hertfordshire GAA)
- U14 Hertfordshire League Winners - Dolan Cup - 2018
- U14 Hertfordshire Cup Winners - 2018
