= Clogher Éire Óg GAC =

Tyrone-based Gaelic games club

Clogher Éire Óg
- An Clochar Éire Óg
- Founded: 1938
- County: Tyrone
- Nickname: The Eire Ogs
- Colours: Maroon & White
- Grounds: St Patrick's Park, Clogher
- Coordinates: 54°24′43″N 7°09′56″W

Playing kits
Standard

Clogher Éire Óg (Irish: Clochar Éireann Óig) is a Gaelic Athletic Association club. The club is based in Clogher in County Tyrone, Northern Ireland.

== History ==
While the present club has been in existence since 1938, a team representing Clogher (Rapparees) previously existed for a brief period between 1907 and 1908.

Clogher won several West Tyrone competitions in the period from 1940 to 1960, including winning the West Tyrone senior league in 1951 and 1957, the St. Enda Cup in 1961. The club were also finalists in the Tyrone Senior Football Championship in 1948.

Clogher fielded a parish camogie team in the 1960s and a handball club in the early 1980s. A new pitch and dressing rooms was opened in 1987, and their second pitch and floodlights in 2002. They subsequently completed construction of a covered stand.

In 2017, Clogher's senior team were defeated in the Junior Championship Final, held in Carrickmore, by Tattyreagh. The following season, 2018, Clogher won promotion to intermediate football, for the first time in 14 years, by winning the division 3 league.

Having previously won Tyrone Junior Football Championship titles in 1972 and 2000, the club won the 2025 Tyrone Junior Football Championship after defeating Drumragh in the final. Clogher then went onto win the Ulster Junior Championship after beating Emyvale in the 2025 final.

== Honours ==
- Ulster Junior Club Football Championship (1): 2025
- Tyrone Junior Football Championship (3): 1972, 2000, 2025
