= Ballinagar GAA =

GAA club in County Offaly, Ireland

- Béal Átha na gCarr CLG
- Founded: 1916
- County: Offaly
- Colours: Sky blue, navy and white
- Grounds: Ballinagar GAA grounds

Playing kits

Ballinagar GAA (Irish: Cumann Luthchleas Gael Béal Átha na gCarr) is a Gaelic Athletic Association club in the village of Ballinagar in County Offaly, Ireland. It fields Gaelic football teams from juvenile up to adult levels, including at intermediate and Junior B grades.

== History ==
Ballinagar bought their current grounds in 1989. The pitch had to be levelled and drained, dressing rooms were also erected, and it was officially opened in 1993 by the director general of the GAA at the time, Liam Mulvihill.

In 2019, there were discussions to amalgamate with their neighbours Raheen. The proposal failed because Raheen did not get the required support for its Extraordinary general meeting.

2022 was one of the most successful years for the club, where they went 28 competitive games unbeaten. They won the Junior A and Junior C football championships as well as the ACFL division 4 and 5 leagues.

Their stand and gym were officially opened in 2022.

In 2023, Ballinagar released proposed plans for a floodlit AstroTurf pitch.

== Juvenile setup ==
At underage level, the club amalgamates with Raheen and Clodiagh Gaels to form 'Na Fianna'.
