= Hugh O'Neills GAA =

Gaelic football team in Leeds, England

Hugh O'Neills GAC
- Founded: 1948
- County: Yorkshire
- Colours: Green/Gold
- Grounds: Páirc Beeston, Leeds, UK
Kit

Hugh O'Neills is a Gaelic football club in Leeds, West Yorkshire, England. Founded in 1948, it is the longest established team in Yorkshire. In 2025, the club won its 22nd Yorkshire Senior Championship. It previously won the now defunct Pennine league 10 years in a row. The club fields both men's and women's Senior teams, and were All-Britain Club Football Championship winners in 1982 and 1999.

== History ==
The club, which was founded in 1948, has won the All-Britain Club Football Championship on two occasions, in 1982 and 1999. After winning the All-Britain club championship in 1999, the qualified for the 1999–2000 All-Ireland Senior Club Football Championship, but were knocked out at the quarter-final stage after being defeated by Crossmolina Deel Rovers by 8-15 to 3 points.

In 2014, the club's members reportedly included former Premier League footballer Dean Windass.

Hugh O'Neills won a championship title on Sunday 10 May 2015. On Thursday 9 July 2015, Hugh O'Neills played Brothers Pearse away in Huddersfield and won by contest 6-09 to 4-09, securing a place in the final.

In 2017, Hugh O'Neills completed a clean sweep of Junior and Senior football titles in Yorkshire including the Junior League and Championship double, the Pennine league division 2 and the Yorkshire Senior League and Championship double. This was the club's second senior championship in 3 years after also claiming the title in 2015.

In 2025, Hugh O'Neills GAA club (Leeds) captured their third consecutive Yorkshire Senior Football Championship. In the semi-final, the club faced Newcastle at Páirc Beeston. While Newcastle held the advantage for much of the game, Hugh O'Neills edged ahead and secured victory in the closing stages. The final score was a 1–11 to 1–7 win to Hugh O'Neills which meant a place in the Yorkshire Championship final. Hugh O'Neills won the final, securing their third consecutive Yorkshire Championship title. After the final, the team returned to Millennium Square in Leeds, where they were greeted by supporters and members of the local Irish community.
