= St Brendan's GAA (Manchester) =

Gaelic football club in Manchester, England

- CLG Naomh Bréanainn
- Founded: 1959
- County: Lancashire
- Nickname: Brendans
- Colours: Maroon and white
- Grounds: Trafford MV RFCC, Trafford

Playing kits
Standard colours

St Brendan's GAC (Irish: Cumann Lúthchleas Gael Naomh Bréanainn) is a Gaelic football club in Trafford, Manchester.

Brendans play men's senior and junior football, with a number of under-age teams beneath them. They are one of the member clubs of the Lancashire County Board.

== History ==
St Brendan's was formed on 24 August 1959 to cater for Irish men and women who had emigrated to Manchester for employment. The club's first chairman was Michael Mangan from County Roscommon. Brendan's were the first Manchester-based club to introduce underage football.

In 2009, Brendans released a book for its 50th anniversary at a dance attended by GAA President Christy Cooney. They moved to their current home at Finny Bank Road in Trafford, home of Trafford MV RFCC, in 2015.

The club holds the record for the most Lancashire Senior Football Championship wins with 22. In 2021, the club won the All-Britain Club Championship for the first time, beating Seán McDermotts of Warwickshire at McGovern Park. They were beaten in the quarter-final of the 2021–22 All-Ireland Junior Club Football Championship by Denn of Cavan.

== Honours ==
Sources:

- All-Britain Club Football Championship (1):
  - 2021
- Lancashire Senior Football Championship (22):
  - 1964, 1967, 1968, 1970, 1971, 1972, 1975, 1978, 1979, 1980, 1983, 1984, 1985, 1986, 1988, 1989, 1990, 1991, 1996, 2021, 2022, 2025

== Notable players ==
- Colum McKinstry - All-Ireland SFC runner-up with Armagh in 1977
- PJ McGowan - Former Donegal and Fermanagh coach
