= Hertfordshire GAA =

Gaelic games governing body in the UK

- Irish: Contae Hertford
- Founded: 1960; 66 years ago
- Province: Britain
- Ground(s): Radlett Road Playing Fields, Watford
- County colours: Gold Green

County teams
- Football Championship: All-Ireland Junior Football Championship

County colours

The Hertfordshire County Board of the Gaelic Athletic Association (GAA), known as Hertfordshire GAA, is one of the seven county boards outside of Ireland, and is responsible for Gaelic games in South East England outside of London. The county board is also responsible for the Hertfordshire county teams. With Gloucestershire, Lancashire, London, Scotland, Warwickshire, and Yorkshire, the board makes up the British Provincial Board.

== History ==
The county board was created in 1960 when it was deemed that the number of clubs in the region north of London supported a separate league. The county encompasses Oxfordshire, Buckinghamshire, Bedfordshire, Huntingdonshire and Cambridgeshire.

Hertfordshire has been affected by the general trend of reduced emigration from Ireland to the UK since the 1980s, and a number of Hertfordshire's original clubs have folded, including Erin Go Bragh in Milton Keynes and Dr Crokes in Harrow. However, the youth sections of the county have proven to be promising and, in 2018, the Hertfordshire under-14s won the Féile Peile na nÓg in County Meath, and followed this by winning a shield competition in Connacht in 2019.

== Football ==
=== Clubs ===
Clubs contest the Hertfordshire Senior Football Championship, with St Colmcilles from St Albans are the current title holders. Each year the winners represent the county in the All-Britain Club Football Championship.

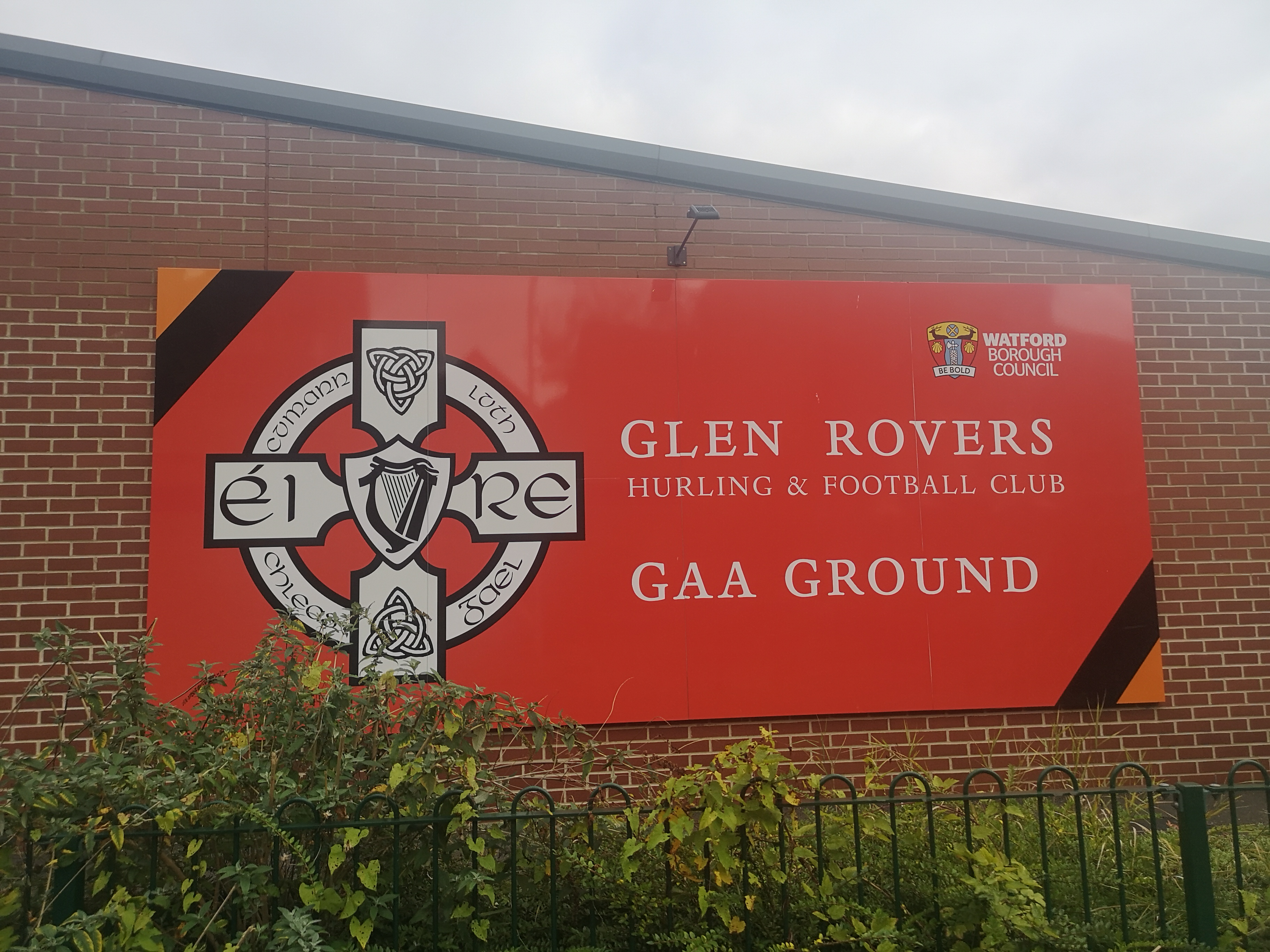
Glen Rovers Hurling & Football Club, Watford, part of Hertfordshire GAA

Club name	Teams	Location	Pitch
Cambridge Parnells	Men's - Senior Ladies' - Senior	Cambridge	Coldhams Common
Claddagh Gaels	Ladies' - Senior	Luton	Sundon Park
Éire Óg	Men's - Senior Ladies' - Senior	Oxford	Horspath Sports Ground
Glen Rovers	Men's - Senior Ladies' - Senior	Watford	Radlett Road Playing Fields
St Anthonys	Men's - Senior	Reading	Kingsmeadow
St Cedds	Men's - Training	Chelmsford	-
St Colmcilles	Men's - Senior Ladies' - Senior	St Albans	Shenley Lane Playing Fields
St Dympnas	Men's - Senior	Luton	Sundon Park
St Josephs	Men's - Senior Ladies' - Senior	Waltham Cross	Capel Manor Gardens
St Vincents	Men's - Senior	Luton	Stockwood Park

=== Hertfordshire Senior Football Championship winners ===
- 1998 St Colmcilles
- 1999 St Colmcilles
- 2000
- 2001 St Colmcilles
- 2002 St Colmcilles
- 2003 St Colmcilles
- 2004 St Colmcilles
- 2005 St Dympnas
- 2006 St Colmcilles
- 2007 Cambridge Parnells
- 2008 St Dympnas
- 2009 Cambridge Parnells
- 2010 Glen Rovers
- 2011 Glen Rovers
- 2012 not played
- 2013 Glen Rovers
- 2014 Éire Óg
- 2015 Glen Rovers
- 2016 St Colmcilles
- 2017 St Colmcilles
- 2018 Éire Óg
- 2019 Éire Óg
- 2020 Éire Óg
- 2021 St Josephs
- 2022 Éire Óg
- 2023 Éire Óg
- 2024 St Josephs
- 2025 St Josephs
- 2026 St Colmcilles

==== Roll of honour ====
- 10 - St Colmcilles
- 6 - Éire Óg
- 4 - Glen Rovers
- 3 - St Josephs
- 2 - St Dympnas, Cambridge Parnells

=== County team ===
Hertfordshire fields a men's county team in the All-Britain Football Championship and a ladies' county team in the Britain LGFA Junior Championship. The Hertfordshire men have not won the All-Britain since the tournament was restructured in 2022, and so have not yet competed in the new format of the All-Ireland Junior Football Championship.

==== Honours ====
- Men's
  - All-Britain Junior Football Championship
    - (gold) Winners (3): 1965, 1972, 2000
    - (silver) Runners-Up: 2013

== Hurling and camogie ==
=== Clubs ===
Hertfordshire currently only has one hurling club, St Declans, which competes in the Warwickshire Senior Hurling Championship.

Club name	Teams	Location
St Declans	Hurling - Senior	Various - countywide

=== County team ===
Hertfordshire currently does not field a county hurling team in the All-Ireland Senior Hurling Championship.

==== Honours ====
- Hurling
  - All-Ireland Junior Hurling Championship
    - (silver) Runners-Up (2): 1970, 1971
