= John Mitchels GAA (Liverpool) =

Gaelic football club in Liverpool, England

- Sean Misteid CLG
- Founded: 1901
- County: Lancashire
- Nickname: Mitchels
- Colours: Blue and yellow
- Grounds: Greenbank Park, Mossley Hill

Playing kits
Standard colours

John Mitchels Gaelic Athletic Club (Irish: Sean Misteid Cumann Lúthchleas Gael) is a Gaelic football club in Mossley Hill, Liverpool.

Mitchels play football at men's senior and junior level, and ladies' intermediate and junior level, as well as having a growing under-age structure. They are one of the member clubs of the Lancashire County Board.

== History ==
The origins of the club go back to 1901, with the "Young Irelands" becoming the first club formally registered in Liverpool. The first Gaelic game in Liverpool was a hurling match against Manchester Martyrs on Easter Monday 1901, with the Young Irelanders coming out on top. The match attracted Special Branch attention.

In 1913, the Young Irelanders' home grounds at Greenwich Park in Aintree were used to host that year's All-Ireland Senior Camogie Championship. The local Liverpool Irish Volunteers also paraded at Greenwich Park in the 1910s, and the GAA in Liverpool was used as a "recruiting ground" for both Sinn Féin and the Liverpool Irish Volunteers who later took part in the Easter Rising.. The club later changed their name to the Irish "Éire Óg". With many of the team deported to Ireland during the Second World War for failing to join the army, the team amalgamated with "St Patrick's" in 1940, named for the Widnes-based parish of the St Patrick's founder, Fr. Paddy Spain.

John Mitchels GFC was registered out of the local Irish League club of the same name in 1947, and amalgamated with St Patrick's a year later to become the "St Patrick's Hurling and John Mitchels Gaelic Football Club".. While there was a break of 2-3 years in the club's continuity in the early 2000s, the team began to field again in 2006, with players joining from the local university teams. Two years after reforming, John Mitchels won the All-Britain Club Championship for the first time.

The club had no permanent pitch for long periods in the 20th century, bouncing around pitches at Broad Green, Yew Tree, Sefton RUFC, Ellesmere Port, Bootle, and Newsham Park. They opened their current, permanent home pitch at Greenbank Park, Mossley Hill in 2007, playing an exhibition match against Enniskillen Gaels, Fermanagh.

In 2009, John Mitchels became the first team from outside Ireland to reach an All-Ireland Junior Club Football Championship final,. They were beaten by Skellig Rangers, Kerry. They were runners up again in 2015, beaten on that occasion by Brosna, also of Kerry.

== Honours ==
=== Men's football ===
- All-Britain Club Football Championship (5)
  - 2007, 2008, 2013, 2014, 2015
- Lancashire Senior Football Championship (14)
  - 1952, 1965, 1966, 1999, 2007, 2008, 2009, 2011, 2013, 2014, 2015, 2016, 2023, 2024

=== Ladies' football ===
- All-Britain Intermediate Ladies' Club Football Championship (1)
  - 2017
- All-Britain Junior Ladies' Club Football Championship (2)
  - 2007, 2008
- Northern Intermediate Ladies' Football Championship (3)
  - 2016, 2017, 2021
- Lancashire Junior Ladies' Football Championship (4)
  - 2010, 2015, 2019, 2021
