= Munster Junior Club Football Championship =

- Current season or competition: 2026 Munster Junior Club Football Championship
- Irish: Craobh Shóisir Peile Mhumhan na gClub
- Code: Gaelic football
- Founded: 2001
- Region: Munster (GAA)
- No. of teams: 6
- Title holders: Ballymacelligott (1st title)
- Most titles: Finuge (2 titles)
- Sponsors: Allied Irish Bank

The Munster Junior Club Football Championship (known for sponsorship reasons as the AIB Munster GAA Football Junior Club Championship, or as the Munster Club JFC for short) is an annual Gaelic football competition organised by the Munster Council of the Gaelic Athletic Association and contested by the six champion junior clubs in the province of Munster in Ireland. It is the most prestigious competition for junior clubs in Munster football.

The Munster Junior Club Championship was introduced in 2001. In its current format, the championship begins in late October or early November and is usually played over a five-week period. The six participating club teams compete in a straight knockout competition that culminates with the Munster final for the two remaining teams. The winner of the Munster Junior Championship qualifies for the subsequent All-Ireland Club Championship.

The competition has been won by 23 teams. Finuge are the only team to have the title on more than one occasion, taking the Munster Club JFC in 2002 and 2004. Kerry clubs have accumulated the highest number of victories with 20 wins. Kerry side Ballymacelligott are the reigning champions, having beaten Buttevant from Cork by 3-12 to 0-08 in the 2025 final.

== Qualification ==
County	Championship	Qualifying team
Clare	Clare Junior A Football Championship	Champions
Cork	Cork Premier Junior Football Championship	Champions
Kerry	Kerry Premier Junior Football Championship	Champions
Limerick	Limerick Junior Football Championship	Champions
Tipperary	Tipperary Junior Football Championship	Champions
Waterford	Waterford Junior Football Championship	Champions

== List of finals ==
Year	Winners			Runners-up		
Year	County	Club	Score	County	Club	Score
2025	Kerry	Ballymacelligott	3-12	Cork	Buttevant	0-08
2024	Cork	Kilmurry	1-10	Kerry	Firies	0-09
2023	Kerry	Listowel Emmets	0-09	Cork	Kilmurry	1-02
2022	Kerry	Fossa	1-17	Cork	Kilmurry	1-06
2021	Kerry	Gneeveguilla	4-18	Tipperary	Ballina	1-06
2020	Cancelled due to COVID-19 pandemic					
2019	Kerry	Na Gaeil	3-13	Tipperary	Mullinahone	1-01
2018	Kerry	Beaufort	2-13	Cork	Dromtarriffe	2-12
2017	Cork	Knocknagree	1-17	Kerry	Dromid Pearses	2-11
2016	Kerry	Glenbeigh-Glencar	2-16	Cork	Gabriel Rangers	0-10
2015	Kerry	Templenoe	2-17	Clare	Coolmeen	0-03
2014	Kerry	Brosna	0-15	Limerick	Glin	2-06
2013	Kerry	Keel	0-14	Limerick	Feohanagh-Castlemahon	0-04
2012	Kerry	Kenmare Shamrocks	0-20	Limerick	Cappamore	2-08
2011	Kerry	Dromid Pearses	0-15	Tipperary	Kiladangan	1-05
2010	Kerry	St. Mary's Cahirciveen	2-12	Limerick	Bruree	0-04
2009	Kerry	Castlegregory	1-20	Limerick	Mountcollins	0-04
2008	Kerry	Skellig Rangers	0-11	Limerick	Bruff	0-07
2007	Cork	Canovee	1-06	Clare	O'Callaghan's Mills	1-05
2006	Kerry	Duagh	1-09	Cork	Adrigole	0-11
2005	Kerry	Ardfert	1-08	Cork	Erin's Own	0-10
2004	Kerry	Finuge	2-13	Cork	Aghabullogue	3-04
2003	Cork	Carbery Rangers	0-13	Kerry	Annascaul	0-11
2002	Kerry	Finuge	0-14	Cork	Kiskeam	0-11
2001	Kerry	St. Michael's/Foilmore		Clare	Éire Óg, Ennis	

== Roll of honour ==
#	County	Titles	Runners-up	Years won	Years runners-up
1	Kerry	20	3	2001, 2002, 2004, 2005, 2006, 2008, 2009, 2010, 2011, 2012, 2013, 2014, 2015, 2016, 2018, 2019, 2021, 2022, 2023, 2025	2003, 2007, 2024
2	Cork	4	9	2003, 2007, 2017, 2024	2002, 2004, 2005, 2006, 2016, 2018, 2022, 2023, 2025
3	Limerick	0	6	—	2007, 2009, 2010, 2012, 2013, 2014
3	Clare	0	3	—	2001, 2007, 2015
3	Tipperary	0	3	—	2011, 2019, 2021

== See also ==
- All Ireland Junior Club Football Championship
- Leinster Junior Club Football Championship
- Connacht Junior Club Football Championship
- Ulster Junior Club Football Championship
