= St Joseph's GAA Club (Waltham Cross) =

Gaelic football club in England

St Joseph's GAA (Waltham Cross)
- Founded: 2005
- County: Hertfordshire
- Nickname: St Joes
- Colours: Maroon and white
- Grounds: Bullsmoor Lane Playing Fields, Enfield, EN1 4RL
Main kit

St Joseph's is a Gaelic football club based in the town of Waltham Cross, Hertfordshire, England. Founded in 2005, the club competes in competitions organised by the Hertfordshire County Board.

== History ==
Founded in April 2005 by Noel Griffin, a native of Carraroe, County Galway (from where the club takes its colours), the club was named after St Joseph's Parish in Waltham Cross. The club was initially accepted, by Hertfordshire GAA, as a Junior club and competed against teams from Watford, St Albans, Luton and Oxford.

The club initially fielded underage sides in Hertfordshire County competitions before fielding a senior side for the first time in July 2011. A ladies' Gaelic football team was established in 2016.

Home matches and training occur at Bullsmoor Lane Playing Fields in the London Borough of Enfield.

== Honours ==
- Hertfordshire Senior League (1): 2016
