= 2001–02 All-Ireland Junior Club Football Championship =

- Sponsor: Allied Irish Bank
- Champions: Drumgoon (1st title); Edward Jackson (captain)
- Runners-up: Belmullet; Stephen Carolan (captain)

The 2001–02 All-Ireland Junior Club Football Championship was the inaugural staging of the All-Ireland Junior Club Football Championship since its establishment by the Gaelic Athletic Association.

The All-Ireland final was played on 18 May 2002 at Shamrock Park in Cremartin, between Drumgoon and Belmullet. Drumgoon won the match by 1-14 to 0-12 to claim their first ever championship title.

== All-Ireland Junior Club Football Championship ==
=== All-Ireland semi-finals ===
1 April 2002 Semi-final	Drumgoon	0-09 - 1-05	An Tóchar	Cremartin Grounds
	P Hand 0-2, P McCabe 0-1, P McEnroe 0-1, K Fannin 0-1, E Jackson 0-1, J McNally 0-1, P McDermott 0-1, P Crossan 0-1.		L Ferguson 1-0, R Brady 0-2, S Cullen 0-1, D Fanning 0-1, N Nolan 0-1.

13 April 2002 Semi-final	Belmullet	1-14 - 0-14	St Michael's/Foilmore	Cremartin Grounds
	BJ Padden 1-5, B Lynch 0-4, M Gaynard 0-2, T Geraghty 0-1, M Kilroy 0-1, A Howard 0-1.		J Clifford 0-5, B Galvin 0-4, S Fogarty 04, L O'Sullivan 0-1.

=== All-Ireland final ===
18 May 2002 Final	Drumgoon	1-14 - 0-12	Belmullet	Shamrock Park
	I O'Reilly 0-4, K Fannin 0-4, E Jackson 1-0, P McDermott, A Crossan 0-3 each.		B Lynch 0-5, S Carolan 0-3, J Sweeney, A Howard, M Gaynard 0-1 each.	Referee: B McNally (Cremartin)
