= Gloucestershire GAA =

Gaelic games governing body in the UK

- Irish: Contae Gloucester
- Founded: 1959; 67 years ago
- Province: Britain
- Ground(s): Pontcanna Fields, Pontcanna; St Mary's Old Boys RFC, Almondsbury
- County colours: Gold Green

County teams
- Football Championship: All-Ireland Junior Football Championship

County colours

The Gloucestershire County Board of the Gaelic Athletic Association (GAA), known as Gloucestershire GAA, is one of the county boards outside Ireland and is responsible for Gaelic games in South West England and Wales. The county board is also responsible for the Gloucestershire county teams. With Hertfordshire, Lancashire, London, Scotland, Warwickshire, and Yorkshire, the board makes up the British Provincial Board.

== History ==
Gaelic games developed relatively later in Wales compared to other regions of Britain, but by 1912, there was at least four active hurling teams; Bargoed Shamrocks, Cardiff Emmetts, Merthyr Sarsfields, and Pontypridd Wolfe Tones. The inaugural South Wales Hurling Championship began in the autumn of 1912 and concluded in February 1913, and an exhibition hurling match was recorded as being played at Cardiff Arms Park in August 1913 in front of 3000 spectators.

While the First World War stopped matches from taking place for a number of years, the South Wales Hurling Championship began again in 1920, featuring resurrected Emmetts and Wolfe Tones sides, as well as new clubs in Maesteg, Mountain Ash, Neath, Tonypandy and Treorchy. By 1921 there were eight hurling and three football clubs. However, the 1926 miners' lockout, amongst other factors, meant that Gaelic games in the Valleys was not picked up again that summer.

Contrastingly, Gaelic games in Bristol can only be traced back as far as 1947 and the formation of St Kiernans as a dual code club in Bristol. In the 1950s and 60s,Gaelic games saw a revival in Wales, with the formation of Cardiff's St Colmcilles and Newport's Pride of Erin clubs, competing now as part of Gloucestershire rather than separately as Wales. The boundaries of Gloucestershire as a county board existed by 1957 and they were formally founded in 1959.

Gloucestershire LGFA was formed as a separate county in 2024 after previously being administrated as GloHerts with Hertfordshire.

== Football ==
=== Clubs ===
| Club name | Teams | Location | Pitch |
|---|---|---|---|
| Brighton and Crawley Gaels | Men's - Senior Ladies' - Senior | Brighton | Waterhall Playing Fields |
| Bristol Harps | Men's - Senior Ladies' - Senior | Bristol | St Marys Old Boys RFC |
| Pride of Erin | Men's - Senior | Newport | Newport Saracens RFC |
| St Colmcilles | Men's - Senior Ladies' - Senior | Cardiff | Pontcanna Fields |
| St Judes | Men's - Senior Ladies' - Senior | Southampton | Southampton RFC |
| St Pirans | Men's - Training | Truro | Sir Ben Ainslie Sports Centre |

=== Gloucestershire Men's Senior Football Championship winners ===
- 1982 Western Gaels
- 1983 Western Gaels
- 1984 Western Gaels
- 1985 Western Gaels
- 1986 Western Gaels
- 1987 Western Gaels
- 1988
- 1989
- 1990 Western Gaels
- 1991 Western Gaels
- 1992 Southern Gaels
- 1993 Southern Gaels
- 1994 Southern Gaels
- 1995 Southern Gaels
- 1996 Southern Gaels
- 1997 Southern Gaels
- 1998 Southern Gaels
- 1999 Western Gaels
- 2000 St Colmcilles
- 2001 Western Gaels
- 2002 St Colmcilles
- 2003 Western Gaels
- 2004 St Colmcilles
- 2005 Western Gaels
- 2006 St Colmcilles
- 2007 St Colmcilles
- 2008 St Colmcilles
- 2009 St Colmcilles
- 2010 Western Gaels
- 2011 St Nicholas
- 2012
- 2013 St Nicholas
- 2014 St Colmcilles
- 2015 Western Gaels
- 2016 Western Gaels
- 2017 St Nicholas
- 2018 St Judes
- 2019 St Judes
- 2020 not played
- 2021 St Judes
- 2022 St Judes
- 2023 St Judes
- 2024 St Judes
- 2025 Bristol Harps
- 2026 Bristol Harps

==== Roll of honour ====
- 15 - Western Gaels
- 7 - Southern Gaels, St Colmcilles
- 6 - St Judes
- 3 - St Nicholas
- 2 - Bristol Harps
- 1 - Plymouth Parnells

=== Gloucestershire Ladies' Senior Football Championship winners ===
- 2024 St Colmcilles
- 2025 St Colmcilles
- 2026 St Colmcilles

==== Roll of honour ====
- 3 - St Colmcilles
