= Leinster Junior Club Football Championship =

Irish Gaelic football competition

- Current season or competition: 2026 Leinster Junior Club Football Championship
- Irish: Craobh Shóisir Peile Laighean na gClub
- Code: Gaelic football
- Founded: 1996
- Region: Leinster (GAA)
- Trophy: Sean Eiffe Memorial Cup
- No. of teams: 13
- Title holders: Grangenolvin (1st title)
- Most titles: No team has won more than once
- Sponsors: Allied Irish Banks

The Leinster Junior Club Football Championship, known for sponsorship reasons as the AIB Leinster Junior Club Football Championship and shortened to the Leinster Club JFC, is a Gaelic football competition between the winners of the Junior football competitions in 10 counties of Leinster, the Intermediate football champions of Kilkenny, the Intermediate football runners-up of Longford and the Senior football champions of Europe. The winner receives the Sean Eiffe Memorial Cup, named for Detective Sergeant Sean Eiffe, a Garda who died in the line of duty in 2001.

The winner then contests the All-Ireland Junior Club Football Championship semi finals against the winners from one of the other three provinces.

== Teams ==
=== Qualification ===
County		Qualifying team
Carlow	Carlow Junior A Football Championship	Champions
Dublin	Dublin Junior A Football Championship	Champions
Europe	European Senior Football Championship	Champions
Kildare	Kildare Junior Football Championship	Champions
Kilkenny	Kilkenny Intermediate Football Championship	Champions
Laois	Laois Junior Football Championship	Champions
Longford	Longford Junior Football Championship	Champions
Louth	Louth Junior Football Championship	Champions
Meath	Meath Junior Football Championship	Champions
Offaly	Offaly Junior Football Championship	Champions
Westmeath	Westmeath Junior Football Championship	Champions
Wexford	Wexford Junior Football Championship	Champions
Wicklow	Wicklow Junior Football Championship	Champions

== List of finals ==
Year	Winner			Runners-up		
Year	County	Club	Score	County	Club	Score
2025	Kildare	Grangenolvin	1-12	Carlow	Fighting Cocks	1-8
2024	Offaly	Ballinagar	2-9	Meath	Dunsany	0-8
2023	Kildare	Milltown	1-9	Louth	Glyde Rangers	1-4
2022	Meath	Castletown	0-12	Wexford	St. Abban's, Adamstown	0-6
2021	Offaly	Clonbullogue	5-3	Kildare	Kilcullen	1-10
2020	Cancelled due to COVID-19 pandemic					
2019	Wexford	Rathgarogue-Cushinstown	0-13	Meath	Clann na nGael	0-12
2018	Louth	Dundalk Young Irelands	2-10	Offaly	St Brigid's	2-7
2017	Westmeath	Multyfarnham	2-6	Offaly	Erin Rovers	0-5
2016	Laois	Rosenallis	1-11	Offaly	Bracknagh	1-8
2015	Meath	Curraha	3-10	Longford	St Brigid's, Killashee	1-11
2014	Westmeath	Moate All-Whites	1-11	Kildare	Straffan	0-10
2013	Kildare	Two Mile House	2-15	Louth	Hunterstown Rovers	1-12
2012	Dublin	Castleknock	1-10	Wexford	St Fintan's	1-5
2011	Meath	Ballivor	1-15	Louth	St Fechin's	1-8
2010	Meath	Ballinabrackey	0-11	Carlow	St Andrew's	0-5
2009	Meath	Longwood	2-13, 0-11 (R)	Louth	St Mochta's	2-13, 0-10 (R)
2008	Meath	Moynalvey	0-11	Westmeath	St. Mary's	0-5
2007	Meath	Clann na nGael	0-15	Westmeath	Rosemount	1-6
2006	Laois	Park/Ratheniska	2-8	Meath	St Ultan's	1-8
2005	Westmeath	Ballinagore	0-9	Kildare	Grange	0-7
2004	Meath	Ratoath	1-16	Offaly	Kilclonfert	1-5
2003	Meath	Wolfe Tones	1-10	Wexford	Kilmore	0-6
2002	Meath	Nobber	0-6	Kildare	Moorefield	0-5
2001	Wicklow	An Tóchar	0-15	Wexford	Inisfails	1-9
2000	Kildare	Sallins	2-10	Dublin	St Finian's	0-15 (R, AET)
1999	Offaly	Clara	0-10	Wexford	St Fintan's	0-9
1998	Meath	Drumree	2-12	Laois	Ballyroan	1-10
1997	Kildare	Kilcullen	1-8	Dublin	St. Vincents	0-5
1996	Dublin	St. Brigids	1-11	Laois	Arles-Killeen	0-10

== Roll of honour ==
#	County	Titles	Year
1	Meath	11	1998, 2002, 2003, 2004, 2007, 2008, 2009, 2010, 2011, 2015, 2022
2	Kildare	5	1997, 2000, 2013, 2023, 2025
3	Westmeath	3	2005, 2014, 2017
3	Offaly	3	1999, 2021, 2024
5	Dublin	2	1996, 2012
5	Laois	2	2006, 2016
7	Wicklow	1	2001
7	Louth	1	2018
7	Wexford	1	2019

== See also ==
- All Ireland Junior Club Football Championship
- Munster Junior Club Football Championship
- Connacht Junior Club Football Championship
- Ulster Junior Club Football Championship
