= Britain GAA =

Provincial council of the Gaelic Athletic Association

- Irish: An Bhreatain
- Province colours: Navy Scarlet
- Major grounds: McGovern Park; Páirc na hÉireann; Old Bedians; Clydebank Community Sports Hub

Most All-Ireland titles
- Hurling: London (1)
- Football: none

Most provincial titles
- Hurling: no championship
- Football: London (24)

Interprovincial Championship wins
- Hurling: do not compete
- Football: do not compete

Standard kit
- Regular kit

The Gaelic Games Council of Britain (GGCB) is the national governing body for Gaelic games in England, Scotland and Wales, and is the only provincial Gaelic games council outside the island of Ireland. The council is made up of the British Provincial Council of the Gaelic Athletic Association, also known as Britain GAA, the British Provincial Council of the Ladies Gaelic Football Association, also known as Britain LGFA, and the British Board of the Camogie Association. The GGCB was recognised by the United Kingdom government as the official national governing body for Gaelic games in 2026.

The British Council is responsible for the seven county boards of Great Britain: Gloucestershire, Hertfordshire, Lancashire, London, Scotland, Warwickshire and Yorkshire. The counties cover wider areas than their names suggest, with the county boards covering the entirety of Great Britain when combined. The most popular sport is Gaelic football and some clubs are dedicated only to that sport.

While the GGCB runs its own competitions, the 'All-Britains', a number of British counties play in the Irish competitions.

== History ==
The Gaelic Athletic Association was founded in Thurles in 1884, with the main goal of the preservation and cultivation of Irish national sport. The late 19th century was a period in which the Home Rule movement was gaining traction in Ireland, and Gaelic games were seen as an outward expression of Irish cultural and national pride, and a rejection of ‘English’ games, such as association football and rugby.

Irish migration in the late 19th and early 20th century brought the Gaelic games over to Britain for the first time. Britain's first formal club was founded in Wallsend in 1885, and by 1901, clubs had been established in London, Glasgow, Manchester, and Liverpool. County boards were founded in London and Glasgow in 1896 and 1903 respectively, aligning themselves directly with the GAA in Ireland, and in 1901, London won the All-Ireland Senior Football Championship, the only team outside of Ireland to do so. Many significant figures in both GAA and Irish history played in London during this early period, including Sam Maguire, Michael Collins, and Liam MacCarthy.

By the 1910s, football and hurling were being played all over Britain, with the boards for London, Liverpool, and Glasgow all playing against Irish counties at various levels and clubs emerging in Wales, Lanarkshire, and Warwickshire. In 1926, the GAA Central Council in Dublin took steps to formalise the administration of Gaelic games in Britain through the establishment of the Provincial Council. London and Liverpool were the 2 initial areas taking their places on the Council in 1927, with the Liverpool County Board changing its name to Lancashire and District in 1934. By 1957, the county boards of Derby, Gloucester, Lancashire, London, Warwickshire, and Yorkshire were active in England, with Wales and Scotland also continuing to develop. Hertfordshire became affiliated in 1960, and the Derby teams moved under the auspices of Warwickshire in 1970. Today, the seven county boards continue to compete along the boundaries established in 1957, with some teams having to compete in alternative county leagues due to lack of opponents locally (as can be seen with the Lancashire hurling league).

The Ladies' Gaelic Football Association was founded in 1974, and the first British ladies' teams were formed in London in 1976. By the late 1980s, county boards had been established in both London and the Pennine region (combining Lancashire and Yorkshire), and in 1989, Britain LGFA was officially formed as a province. The county boards of Warwickshire, Scotland, and Gloucestershire-Hertfordshire (Glo-Herts) were formed and officially affiliated in 1994, 2013, and 2015 respectively, with Gloucestershire and Hertfordshire splitting into separate ladies' counties in 2024.

While camogie has been played casually in Britain since the 1950s, it was the mid-1980s before official clubs were formed, including Erin go Bragh in Birmingham, and Tara, Croydon, and Newham Gaels in London. Camogie remains one of the least played of the Gaelic games in Great Britain; however, there is currently a senior and intermediate league and championship, with clubs operating in Birmingham, Glasgow, Liverpool, London, and Manchester. There is currently no inter-county camogie fixtures, but there is plans for a London team to be formed in the near future.

Gaelic handball has a long history in Britain, with handball historians tracing the game in Scotland to as early as the fifteenth century, while Irish communities in Britain helped maintain and develop the sport during the nineteenth and twentieth centuries. Britain has played a notable role in the development of the sport outside Ireland, with London hosted the All-Ireland Senior Handball Finals in 1990, becoming one of the few locations outside Ireland to stage an All-Ireland final. Britain GAA are the national governing body for all codes of handball (including one-wall handball), with Britain entering a team in the World Handball Championships for the first time in 1984. In 2024, more than 500 competitive handball matches were reported across Britain, with players competing in domestic, Irish and World Championship events, and efforts have been made to expand and develop the sport, including targeted development initiatives in Scotland and plans for tournaments, coaching events and the creation of a wider British handball championship structure.

Despite being traditionally considered a Gaelic game, shinty in Scotland is organised by the Camanachd Association and is not affiliated by the GGCB. Composite rules shinty-hurling games have occurred, both in Britain and between Scotland and Ireland, but these tend to be organised by the GAA and the Camanachd Association directly.

== Counties ==
The provincial counties of Britain (An Bhreatain)

| County board | Gaeilge | Nickname | Year established | County ground |
|---|---|---|---|---|
| Gloucestershire | Contae Gloucester | 'Glos' | 1959; 67 years ago | Pontcanna Fields, Cardiff |
| Hertfordshire | Contae Hertford | 'Herts' | 1960; 66 years ago | Radlett Road, Watford |
| Lancashire | Lancasír | 'The Red Rose County' | 1926; 100 years ago | Old Bedians, Didsbury |
| London | Londain | 'The Exiles' | 1896; 130 years ago | McGovern Park, Ruislip |
| Scotland | Albain | 'Alba' | 1897; 129 years ago | Clydebank Sports Hub, Clydebank |
| Warwickshire | Contae Warwick | 'Warks' | 1941; 85 years ago | Páirc na hÉireann, Solihull |
| Yorkshire | Sír Eabhrac | 'God's Own Country' | 1948; 78 years ago | Páirc Beeston, Leeds |

== Men's Gaelic football ==
=== Overview of competitions ===
| County board | County | | Club (provincial) | | Club (county) | | |
| County board | Senior | Junior | Senior | Intermediate | Senior | Intermediate | Junior |
|---|---|---|---|---|---|---|---|
| Gloucestershire | | All-Britain Football Championship / All-Ireland Junior Football Championship | All-Britain Club Football Championship | | Gloucestershire Senior Football Championship | | |
| Hertfordshire | | All-Britain Football Championship / All-Ireland Junior Football Championship | All-Britain Club Football Championship | | Hertfordshire Senior Football Championship | | |
| Lancashire | | All-Britain Football Championship / All-Ireland Junior Football Championship | All-Britain Club Football Championship | | Lancashire Senior Football Championship | | Lancashire Junior Football Championship |
| London | National Football League / Connacht Senior Football Championship / All-Ireland Senior Football Championship (or Tailteann Cup) | All-Britain Football Championship / All-Ireland Junior Football Championship | Connacht Senior Club Football Championship | All-Britain Club Football Championship | London Senior Football Championship | London Intermediate Football Championship | London Junior Football Championship |
| Scotland | | All-Britain Football Championship / All-Ireland Junior Football Championship | All-Britain Club Football Championship | | Scottish Senior Football Championship | Scottish Intermediate Football Championship | |
| Warwickshire | | All-Britain Football Championship / All-Ireland Junior Football Championship | All-Britain Club Football Championship | | Warwickshire Senior Football Championship | Warwickshire Intermediate Football Championship | |
| Yorkshire | | All-Britain Football Championship / All-Ireland Junior Football Championship | All-Britain Club Football Championship | | Yorkshire Senior Football Championship | | |

=== Inter-county level ===
London compete in Division 4 of the National Football League, as well as the Connacht Senior Football Championship. Despite having never won the Connacht SFC, they did reach the final in 2013 but were beaten by Mayo. In addition, while London were runners-up in the All-Ireland Senior Football Championship 5 times between 1900 and 1910, they have never won the competition, with no other British county team having ever entered the competition. Since 2022, London have qualified for the Tailteann Cup.

All seven counties compete in the All-Britain Football Championship; a junior-level competition; with London sending a 'home-grown' team of only players from the county originally. The winner of the All-Britain qualifies for the All-Ireland Junior Football Championship, however, a competition restructure by the GAA in 2022, a restructure in 2022 saw the All-Ireland JFC cease to be a tournament played between the junior teams of the 32 counties. Since the 2022 season, the All-Ireland JFC is contested between the winner and runner-up of the All-Britain, Kilkenny (who only have a junior-level county team), and a home-grown New York team (with USGAA added in 2024). This means that while British counties can win an All-Ireland, they can no longer compete against the 31 counties with senior county teams in any competitive matches (except London).

All seven counties have won at least one All-Britain, with Scotland becoming the last team to do so in 2014. Since 2022, London and Warwickshire have dominated the competition, competing in every final.

=== Club level ===
The All-Britain Club Football Championship is a junior-level competition contested by the Gloucestershire, Hertfordshire, and Yorkshire county champions, the Lancashire, Scotland, and Warwickshire senior champions, and the winner of a play-off between the London intermediate and junior champions. From the inception of the All-Ireland Senior Club Football Championship in 1974 up until 2004, the winner of the All-Britain entered the quarter-finals of the senior competition. However, with the creation of the intermediate and junior All-Ireland competitions in the 2004-05 season, the British champions began competing in the All-Ireland Junior Club Football Championship from the 2005-06 season onwards. The 2004-05 reshuffle also saw the London Senior Football Championship winners go straight into the quarter-finals of the senior All-Ireland competition, before moving into the Connacht Senior Club Football Championship in 2018.

The All-Britain has seen multiple periods of dominance from one club, with multiple teams recording three-peats and one team, Kingdom, recording four consecutive wins between 1976 and 1979. However, teams have often struggled against Irish opposition, with John Mitchels being the only British men's club football team to appear in an All-Ireland final (twice, in the 2008-09 and 2014-15 seasons). No British club team has ever won a game in the All-Ireland Senior Club Football Championship.

==== Performance of British clubs in All-Ireland Club Football Championships ====
| Year | Competition | Round | British club | | Score | | Irish club | | Venue | Source |
| Year | Competition | Round | County | Name | Score | | Name | County | Venue | Source |
|---|---|---|---|---|---|---|---|---|---|---|
| 2026-27 | Connacht Senior Club Football Championship | Quarter-final | LON | Fulham Irish | 1-9 | 1-22 | Castlebar Mitchels | MAY | McGovern Park, Ruislip | |
| 2025-26 | Connacht Senior Club Football Championship | Quarter-final | LON | North London Shamrocks | 0-10 | 1-15 | Ballina Stephenites | MAY | Connacht Centre of Excellence, Galway | |
| 2025-26 | All-Ireland Junior Club Football Championship | Quarter-final | LON | Tara | 1-13 | 2-11 | Clogher Éire Óg | TYR | Mullaghmoyle Park, Stewartstown | |
| 2024-25 | Connacht Senior Club Football Championship | Quarter-final | LON | North London Shamrocks | 0-9 | 0-15 | Ballina Stephenites | MAY | McGovern Park, Ruislip | |
| 2024-25 | All-Ireland Junior Club Football Championship | Quarter-final | LON | Tara | 1-8 | 4-10 | Naomh Pádraig | DON | McGovern Park, Ruislip | |
| 2023-24 | Connacht Senior Club Football Championship | Quarter-final | LON | Fulham Irish | 0-5 | 3-11 | Ballina Stephenites | MAY | MacHale Park, Castlebar | |
| 2023-24 | All-Ireland Junior Club Football Championship | Quarter-final | LON | Wandsworth Gaels | 1-3 | 2-8 | Arva | CAV | Breffni Park, Cavan | |
| 2022-23 | Connacht Senior Club Football Championship | Quarter-final | LON | St Kiernans | 1-8 | 3-8 | St Marys | LEI | McGovern Park, Ruislip | |
| 2022-23 | All-Ireland Junior Club Football Championship | Quarter-final | SCO | Glaschu Gaels | 2-5 | 2-10 | Stewartstown Harps | TYR | Clydebank Sports Hub, Clydebank | |
| 2021-22 | Connacht Senior Club Football Championship | Quarter-final | LON | St Kiernans | 0-4 | 0-9 | Tourlestrane | SLI | Markievicz Park, Sligo | |
| 2021-22 | All-Ireland Junior Club Football Championship | Quarter-final | LAN | St Brendans | 2-6 | 3-16 | Denn | CAV | St Oliver Plunkett Park, Crossmaglen | |
| 2020-21 | cancelled due to COVID-19 pandemic | | | | | | | | | |
| 2019-20 | Connacht Senior Club Football Championship | Semi-final | LON | Tír Chonaill Gaels | 0-8 | 2-10 | Pádraig Pearses | ROS | McGovern Park, Ruislip | |
| 2019-20 | All-Ireland Junior Club Football Championship | Quarter-final | LON | Thomas McCurtains | 0-10 | 2-11 | Blackhill | MON | McGovern Park, Ruislip | |
| 2018-19 | Connacht Senior Club Football Championship | Quarter-final | LON | Tír Chonaill Gaels | 1-10 | 1-15 | Clann na nGael | ROS | Dr Hyde Park, Roscommon | |
| 2018-19 | All-Ireland Junior Club Football Championship | Quarter-final | SCO | Dunedin Connollys | 1-15 | 3-11 | Red Hughs | DON | O'Donnell Park, Letterkenny | |
| 2017-18 | All-Ireland Senior Club Football Championship | Quarter-final | LON | Fulham Irish | 1-4 | 3-8 | Corofin | GAL | McGovern Park, Ruislip | |
| 2017-18 | All-Ireland Junior Club Football Championship | Quarter-final | SCO | Dunedin Connollys | 2-6 | 1-10 | Naomh Colmcille | DON | Granton Road, Edinburgh | |
| 2016-17 | All-Ireland Senior Club Football Championship | Quarter-final | LON | St Kiernans | 0-5 | 2-11 | Slaughtneil | DER | Tír Chonaill Park, Greenford | |
| 2016-17 | All-Ireland Junior Club Football Championship | Semi-final | SCO | Dunedin Connollys | 2-6 | 1-18 | Rock St Patricks | TYR | Athletic Grounds, Armagh | |
| 2016-17 | All-Ireland Junior Club Football Championship | Quarter-final | SCO | Dunedin Connollys | 1-9 | 1-6 | Rosenallis | LAO | Granton Road, Edinburgh | |
| 2015-16 | All-Ireland Senior Club Football Championship | Quarter-final | LON | Tír Chonaill Gaels | 0-9 | 2-12 | Clonmel Commercials | TIP | McGovern Park, Ruislip | |
| 2015-16 | All-Ireland Junior Club Football Championship | Quarter-final | LAN | John Mitchels | 0-6 | 2-8 | Templenoe | KER | Páirc na nÉireann, Solihull | |
| 2014-15 | All-Ireland Senior Club Football Championship | Quarter-final | LON | Tír Chonaill Gaels | 0-2 | 0-9 | Corofin | GAL | McGovern Park, Ruislip | |
| 2014-15 | All-Ireland Junior Club Football Championship | Final | LAN | John Mitchels | 0-5 | 0-8 | Brosna | KER | Croke Park, Dublin | |
| 2014-15 | All-Ireland Junior Club Football Championship | Semi-final | LAN | John Mitchels | 1-9 | 1-6 | Moate All Whites | WES | Páirc Tailteann, Navan | |
| 2014-15 | All-Ireland Junior Club Football Championship | Quarter-final | LAN | John Mitchels | 1-14 | 1-9 | Aran Islands | GAL | Páirc na nÉireann, Solihull | |
| 2013-14 | All-Ireland Senior Club Football Championship | Quarter-final | LON | Kingdom Kerry Gaels | 2-7 | 3-9 | Ballinderry Shamrocks | DER | McGovern Park, Ruislip | |
| 2013-14 | All-Ireland Junior Club Football Championship | Quarter-final | LAN | John Mitchels | 0-12 | 2-9 | Emyvale | MON | Páirc na nÉireann, Solihull | |
| 2012-13 | All-Ireland Senior Club Football Championship | Quarter-final | LON | Tír Chonaill Gaels | 0-6 | 3-12 | Dr Crokes | KER | McGovern Park, Ruislip | |
| 2012-13 | All-Ireland Junior Club Football Championship | Quarter-final | LAN | St Peters | 1-12 | 3-13 | Castleknock | DUB | Old Bedians, Didsbury | |
| 2011-12 | All-Ireland Senior Club Football Championship | Quarter-final | LON | Fulham Irish | 0-7 | 1-12 | St Brigids | ROS | McGovern Park, Ruislip | |
| 2011-12 | All-Ireland Junior Club Football Championship | Quarter-final | YOR | Cuchulainns | 0-5 | 1-8 | Dromid Pearses | KER | Páirc na nÉireann, Solihull | |
| 2010-11 | All-Ireland Senior Club Football Championship | Quarter-final | LON | Neasden Gaels | 0-5 | 1-8 | Crossmaglen Rangers | ARM | McGovern Park, Ruislip | |
| 2010-11 | All-Ireland Junior Club Football Championship | Semi-final | LAN | St Peters | 0-5 | 2-14 | St Marys | KER | Monaleen, Castletroy | |
| 2010-11 | All-Ireland Junior Club Football Championship | Quarter-final | LAN | St Peters | 2-9_{aet} | 0-14 | Parke-Keelogues-Crimlin | MAY | Old Bedians, Didsbury | |
| 2009-10 | All-Ireland Senior Club Football Championship | Quarter-final | LON | Tír Chonaill Gaels | 0-3 | 1-4 | Kilmurry-Ibrickane | CLA | McGovern Park, Ruislip | |
| 2009-10 | All-Ireland Junior Club Football Championship | Quarter-final | SCO | Dunedin Connollys | 0-7 | 3-7 | Emyvale | MON | Páirc Esler, Newry | |
| 2008-09 | All-Ireland Senior Club Football Championship | Quarter-final | LON | Tír Chonaill Gaels | 0-6 | 2-7 | Corofin | GAL | McGovern Park, Ruislip | |
| 2008-09 | All-Ireland Junior Club Football Championship | Final | LAN | John Mitchels | 0-9 | 0-10 | Skellig Rangers | KER | Croke Park, Dublin | |
| 2008-09 | All-Ireland Junior Club Football Championship | Semi-final | LAN | John Mitchels | 0-10 | 0-8 | Killala | MAY | Páirc Seán Mac Diarmada, Carrick-on-Shannon | |
| 2008-09 | All-Ireland Junior Club Football Championship | Quarter-final | LAN | John Mitchels | 1-10 | 1-8 | Moynalvey | MEA | Páirc Tailteann, Navan | |
| 2007-08 | All-Ireland Senior Club Football Championship | Quarter-final | LON | Tír Chonaill Gaels | 0-6 | 0-10 | Crossmaglen Rangers | ARM | McGovern Park, Ruislip | |
| 2007-08 | All-Ireland Junior Club Football Championship | Quarter-final | LAN | John Mitchels | 1-4 | 1-11 | Canovee | COR | Pairc Ui Chaoimh, Cork | |
| 2006-07 | All-Ireland Senior Club Football Championship | Quarter-final | LON | St Brendans | 0-5 | 2-12 | Dr Crokes | KER | McGovern Park, Ruislip | |
| 2006-07 | All-Ireland Junior Club Football Championship | Quarter-final | LON | Fulham Irish | 0-3 | 1-5 | Killala | MAY | Fr O’Hara Park, Charlestown | |
| 2005-06 | All-Ireland Senior Club Football Championship | Quarter-final | LON | Tír Chonaill Gaels | 0-5 | 0-9 | Salthill-Knocknacarra | GAL | McGovern Park, Ruislip | |
| 2005-06 | All-Ireland Junior Club Football Championship | Quarter-final | LON | Harlesden Harps | 0-7 | 1-14 | Monaghan Harps | MON | Gavan Duffy Park, Monaghan | |
| 2004-05 | All-Ireland Senior Club Football Championship | Quarter-final | LON | Kingdom Kerry Gaels | 1-9 | 2-10 | Crossmaglen Rangers | ARM | McGovern Park, Ruislip | |
| 2004-05 | All-Ireland Intermediate Club Football Championship | Quarter-final | LAN | St Peters | 1-2 | 5-15 | Pomeroy Plunketts | TYR | Old Bedians, Didsbury | |
| 2003-04 | All-Ireland Senior Club Football Championship | Quarter-final | LON | Tara | 1-8 | 3-12 | An Ghaeltacht | KER | McGovern Park, Ruislip | |
| 2002-03 | All-Ireland Senior Club Football Championship | Quarter-final | LON | St Brendans | 1-7 | 1-11 | Crossmolina Deel Rovers | MAY | McGovern Park, Ruislip | |
| 2001-02 | All-Ireland Senior Club Football Championship | Quarter-final | LON | Tír Chonaill Gaels | 0-6 | 2-14 | Ballinderry Shamrocks | DER | McGovern Park, Ruislip | |
| 2000-01 | All-Ireland Senior Club Football Championship | Quarter-final | LON | Tír Chonaill Gaels | 0-6 | 2-8 | Nemo Rangers | COR | McGovern Park, Ruislip | |
| 1999-00 | All-Ireland Senior Club Football Championship | Quarter-final | YOR | Hugh O'Neills | 0-4 | 8-15 | Crossmolina Deel Rovers | MAY | Páirc Beeston, Leeds | |
| 1998-99 | All-Ireland Senior Club Football Championship | Quarter-final | LON | Tír Chonaill Gaels | 0-8 | 1-18 | Crossmaglen Rangers | ARM | McGovern Park, Ruislip | |
| 1997-98 | All-Ireland Senior Club Football Championship | Quarter-final | LON | Tír Chonaill Gaels | 0-8 | 0-15 | Castlehaven | COR | McGovern Park, Ruislip | |
| 1996-97 | All-Ireland Senior Club Football Championship | Quarter-final | LON | Tír Chonaill Gaels | 2-6 | 1-11 | Knockmore | MAY | McGovern Park, Ruislip | |
| 1995-96 | All-Ireland Senior Club Football Championship | Quarter-final | LON | Tara | 0-5 | 0-11 | Mullaghbawn | ARM | Parnell Park, London | |
| 1994-95 | All-Ireland Senior Club Football Championship | Quarter-final | LAN | Oisín | 0-3 | 3-18 | Castlehaven | COR | Castlehaven Sportsfield, Castlehaven | |
| 1993-94 | All-Ireland Senior Club Football Championship | Quarter-final | LON | Tír Chonaill Gaels | 0-8 | 0-11 | Castlebar Mitchels | MAY | McGovern Park, Ruislip | |
| 1992-93 | All-Ireland Senior Club Football Championship | Quarter-final | LON | Tír Chonaill Gaels | 1-7 | 0-12 | Lavey | DER | McGovern Park, Ruislip | |
| 1991-92 | All-Ireland Senior Club Football Championship | Quarter-final | LON | Parnells | 1-7 | 3-9 | Dr Crokes | KER | McGovern Park, Ruislip | |
| 1990-91 | All-Ireland Senior Club Football Championship | Quarter-final | LON | Tír Chonaill Gaels | 1-12 | 2-11 | Lavey | DER | McGovern Park, Ruislip | |
| 1989-90 | All-Ireland Senior Club Football Championship | Quarter-final | LON | Kingdom Kerry Gaels | 1-4 | 2-9 | Clann na nGael | ROS | St Brigid's Park, Kiltoom | |
| 1988-89 | All-Ireland Senior Club Football Championship | Quarter-final | WAR | John Mitchels | 0-2 | 3-15 | Nemo Rangers | COR | Ballinglough, Cork | |
| 1987-88 | All-Ireland Senior Club Football Championship | Quarter-final | LON | Kingdom Kerry Gaels | 0-7 | 0-16 | Clann na nGael | ROS | St Brigid's Park, Kiltoom | |
| 1986-87 | All-Ireland Senior Club Football Championship | Quarter-final | LON | Kingdom Kerry Gaels | 0-7 | 2-10 | Castleblayney Faughs | MON | St Mary's Park, Castleblayney | |
| 1985-86 | All-Ireland Senior Club Football Championship | Quarter-final | LON | Kingdom Kerry Gaels | 2-4 | 5-12 | Castleisland Desmonds | KER | Castleisland Desmonds Park, Castleisland | |
| 1984-85 | All-Ireland Senior Club Football Championship | Quarter-final | LON | Parnells | 0-5 | 0-11 | Clann na nGael | ROS | Páirc Chiaráin, Athlone | |
| 1983-84 | All-Ireland Senior Club Football Championship | Quarter-final | LON | Tír Chonaill Gaels | 0-2 | 3-12 | Burren | DOW | St Mary's Park, Burren | |
| 1982-83 | All-Ireland Senior Club Football Championship | Quarter-final | YOR | Hugh O'Neills | 1-6 | 5-21 | St Finbarrs | COR | Neenan Park, Cork | |
| 1981-82 | All-Ireland Senior Club Football Championship | Quarter-final | LON | Parnells | 0-8 | 0-9 | Garrymore | MAY | Garrymore, Hollymount | |
| 1980-81 | All-Ireland Senior Club Football Championship | Quarter-final | LON | Tara | 0-5 | 1-8 | Scotstown | MON | Páirc Ghabhán Uí Dhufaigh, Monaghan | |
| 1979-80 | All-Ireland Senior Club Football Championship | Quarter-final | LON | Kingdom Kerry Gaels | 1-3 | 3-17 | St Finbarrs | COR | Páirc Uí Chaoimh, Cork | |
| 1977-78 | All-Ireland Senior Club Football Championship | Quarter-final | LON | Kingdom Kerry Gaels | 1-8 | 4-9 | St Johns | ANT | Corrigan Park, Belfast | |
| 1976-77 | All-Ireland Senior Club Football Championship | Quarter-final | LON | Kingdom Kerry Gaels | 0-7 | 2-16 | Austin Stacks | KER | Austin Stack Park, Tralee | |
| 1975-76 | All-Ireland Senior Club Football Championship | Quarter-final | WAR | Sean McDermotts | 0-8 | 1-7 | Roscommon Gaels | ROS | Dr Hyde Park, Roscommon | |
| 1974-75 | Ulster Senior Club Football Championship | Preliminary round | SCO | Glasgow | 1-7 | 4-11 | Clan na Gael | ARM | Pearse Park, Glasgow | |
| 1972-73 | Ulster Senior Club Football Championship | Preliminary round | SCO | Glasgow | 2-3 | 4-12 | Clan na Gael | ARM | Pearse Park, Glasgow | |

=== Inter-varsity level ===
==== British University Men's Football Championship roll of honour ====
- 1991 Crewe & Alsager College
- 1992 St Mary's University, Twickenham
- 1993 Swansea University
- 1994 University of Dundee
- 1995 Luton University
- 1996 Liverpool John Moores University
- 1997 St Mary's University, Twickenham
- 1998 St Mary's University, Twickenham
- 1999 Liverpool John Moores University
- 2000 St Mary's University, Twickenham
- 2001 Abertay University
- 2002 St Mary's University, Twickenham
- 2003 St Mary's University, Twickenham
- 2004 St Mary's University, Twickenham
- 2005 St Mary's University, Twickenham
- 2006 Liverpool John Moores University
- 2007 Liverpool John Moores University
- 2008 Liverpool John Moores University
- 2009 Liverpool John Moores University
- 2010 Edinburgh Napier University
- 2011 Liverpool John Moores University
- 2012 Liverpool Hope University
- 2013 Liverpool John Moores University
- 2014 Liverpool John Moores University
- 2015 Liverpool Hope University
- 2016 Liverpool Hope University
- 2017 Robert Gordon University
- 2018 Liverpool Hope University
- 2019 Liverpool Hope University
- 2020 not played
- 2021 not played
- 2022 Liverpool John Moores University
- 2023 Liverpool John Moores University
- 2024 Liverpool Hope University
- 2025 Liverpool John Moores University
- 2026 University of Liverpool

==== British University Men's Football Championship wins by university ====
| University | Wins |
|---|---|
| Liverpool John Moores University | 12 |
| St Mary's University, Twickenham | 8 |
| Liverpool Hope University | 6 |
| University of Liverpool | 1 |
| Robert Gordon University | 1 |
| Manchester Metropolitan University | 1 |
| Abertay University | 1 |
| Edinburgh Napier University | 1 |
| Swansea University | 1 |
| University of Bedfordshire | 1 |
| University of Dundee | 1 |

== Ladies' Gaelic football ==
=== Overview of competitions ===
| County board | County | | Club (provincial) | | Club (county) | |
| County board | Senior | Junior | Intermediate | Junior | Intermediate | Junior |
|---|---|---|---|---|---|---|
| Gloucestershire | | All-Britain Ladies' Football Championship | | All-Britain Junior Ladies' Club Football Championship | | Gloucestershire Junior Ladies' Football Championship |
| Hertfordshire | | All-Britain Ladies' Football Championship | | All-Britain Junior Ladies' Club Football Championship | | Hertfordshire Junior Ladies' Football Championship |
| Lancashire | | All-Britain Ladies' Football Championship | All-Britain Intermediate Ladies' Club Football Championship | All-Britain Junior Ladies' Club Football Championship | Northern Intermediate Ladies' Football Championship | Lancashire Junior Ladies' Football Championship |
| London | Ulster Junior Ladies' Football Championship / All-Ireland Junior Ladies' Football Championship | All-Britain Ladies' Football Championship | All-Britain Intermediate Ladies' Club Football Championship | All-Britain Junior Ladies' Club Football Championship | London Intermediate Ladies' Football Championship | London Junior Ladies' Football Championship |
| Scotland | | All-Britain Ladies' Football Championship | All-Britain Intermediate Ladies' Club Football Championship | All-Britain Junior Ladies' Club Football Championship | Northern Intermediate Ladies' Football Championship | Scottish Junior Ladies' Football Championship |
| Warwickshire | | All-Britain Ladies' Football Championship | All-Britain Intermediate Ladies' Club Football Championship | All-Britain Junior Ladies' Club Football Championship | Northern Intermediate Ladies' Football Championship | Warwickshire Junior Ladies' Football Championship |
| Yorkshire | | All-Britain Ladies' Football Championship | All-Britain Intermediate Ladies' Club Football Championship | All-Britain Junior Ladies' Club Football Championship | Northern Intermediate Ladies' Football Championship | Yorkshire Junior Ladies' Football Championship |

=== Inter-county level ===
While London compete in the Ulster Ladies' Senior Championship and the All-Ireland Junior Ladies' Football Championship, there has been no official 15-a-side inter-county ladies' football tournament since 2022. Instead, annual adult 9-a-side tournaments have been run, with full inter-county tournaments existing at different age-grade levels in the form of 'féiles': football tournaments that occur at one venue with all teams playing multiple games on the same day/across a weekend. While county teams from Lancashire and Scotland have both competed in the All-Ireland Championships, since the COVID-19 pandemic only London have resumed playing competitive fixtures against Irish opponents.

==== All-Britain Ladies' Football Championship roll of honour ====
- 1990 London
- 1991 London
- 1992 London
- 1993 London
- 1994 Lancashire
- 1995 Lancashire
- 1996 Lancashire
- 1997 Lancashire
- 1998 Warwickshire
- 1999 London
- 2000 Lancashire
- 2001
- 2002
- 2003
- 2004 London
- 2005
- 2006
- 2007 London
- 2008 London
- 2009
- 2010
- 2011
- 2012
- 2013
- 2014
- 2015 Scotland
- 2016 London
- 2017
- 2018 Yorkshire
- 2019 London
- 2020 not played
- 2021
- 2022 London
- 2023
- 2024
- 2025

==== All-Britain Ladies' Football Championship wins by county ====
| County | Wins |
|---|---|
| London | 10 |
| Lancashire | 5 |
| Warwickshire | 1 |
| Yorkshire | 1 |
| Scotland | 1 |

=== Club level ===
National level ladies' club football in Britain is split into intermediate and junior levels. The junior competition involving the winners of the junior county championships in a knock-out format. However, the intermediate championship is contested between the winner and runner-up of the London Intermediate Ladies' Club Football Championship, contested between intermediate clubs in London, and the winner and runner-up of the Northern Intermediate Ladies' Club Football Championship, contested between the intermediate clubs in Lancashire, Scotland, and Warwickshire.

The winner of the All-Britain Intermediate Ladies' Club Football Championship enters the quarter finals of the All-Ireland Intermediate Ladies' Club Football Championship, while the winner of the All-Britain Junior Ladies' Club Football Championship enters the preliminary round of the All-Ireland Junior Ladies' Club Football Championship against opposition from Gaelic Games Europe.

Emerald Gaels, a Manchester-based team, dominated the early days of the All-Britain, but in 2012 Parnells became the first (and to date, only) non-Irish club to win an All-Ireland championship, beating Cahir (Tipperary) in the final. In 2013, Dunedin Connollys went to the final of the junior competition, but lost out to Na Gaeil (Kerry).

==== All-Britain Ladies' Club Football Championship roll of honour ====
===== Intermediate =====
- 2010 Parnells
- 2011 Parnells
- 2012 Parnells
- 2013 Fr Murphys
- 2014 Dunedin Connollys
- 2015 Dunedin Connollys
- 2016 Parnells
- 2017 John Mitchels, Liverpool
- 2018 Dunedin Connollys
- 2019 Oisins
- 2020 not played
- 2021 Holloway Gaels
- 2022 Round Towers
- 2023 Tír Conaill Gaels
- 2024 Dunedin Connollys
- 2025 Holloway Gaels
- 2026 Dunedin Connollys

===== Junior =====
- 1996 Emerald Gaels
- 1997 Emerald Gaels
- 1998 Emerald Gaels
- 1999 Emerald Gaels
- 2000 Emerald Gaels
- 2001 Emerald Gaels
- 2002 Emerald Gaels
- 2003 Emerald Gaels
- 2004 Emerald Gaels
- 2005 Tara
- 2006 John Mitchels, Birmingham
- 2007 John Mitchels, Liverpool
- 2008 John Mitchels, Liverpool
- 2009 Kingdom Kerry Gaels
- 2010 Oisins
- 2011 Fulham Irish
- 2012 Holloway Gaels
- 2013 Dunedin Connollys
- 2014 Wolfe Tones
- 2015 Oisins
- 2016 Glaschu Gaels
- 2017 Kingdom Kerry Gaels
- 2018 Roger Casements
- 2019 Oisins
- 2020 not played
- 2021 Tir na Nog
- 2022 Hugh O'Neills
- 2023 Glaschu Gaels
- 2024 Wandsworth Gaels
- 2025 St Kiernans
- 2026 Oisins

==== All-Britain Ladies' Club Football Championship wins by club ====
| Team | County | Intermediate Wins | Junior Wins |
|---|---|---|---|
| Dunedin Connollys | SCO | 5 | 1 |
| Parnells | LON | 4 | 0 |
| Holloway Gaels | LON | 2 | 1 |
| Oisín | LAN | 1 | 4 |
| John Mitchels, Liverpool | LAN | 1 | 2 |
| Fr Murphys | LON | 1 | 0 |
| Round Towers | LON | 1 | 0 |
| Tír Conaill Gaels | LON | 1 | 0 |
| Emerald Gaels | LAN | 0 | 9 |
| Glaschu Gaels | SCO | 0 | 2 |
| Kingdom Kerry Gaels | LON | 0 | 2 |
| Fulham Irish | LON | 0 | 1 |
| Hugh O'Neills | YOR | 0 | 1 |
| John Mitchels, Birmingham | WAR | 0 | 1 |
| Roger Casements | WAR | 0 | 1 |
| St Kiernans | LON | 0 | 1 |
| Tara | LON | 0 | 1 |
| Tir na Nog | YOR | 0 | 1 |
| Wandsworth Gaels | LON | 0 | 1 |
| Wolfe Tones | LAN | 0 | 1 |

==== Performance of British clubs in All-Ireland Ladies' Club Football Championships ====
| Year | Competition | Round | British club | | Score | | Irish club | | Venue | Source |
| Year | Competition | Round | County | Name | Score | | Name | County | Venue | Source |
|---|---|---|---|---|---|---|---|---|---|---|
| 2026 | All-Ireland Ladies' Intermediate Club Football Championship | Quarter-final | SCO | Dunedin Connollys | 5-6 | 2-9 | Truagh | MON | Newbridge, Derry | |
| 2026 | All-Ireland Ladies' Junior Club Football Championship | Quarter-final | LAN | Oisín | 1-16 | 2-20 | Sperrin Óg | TYR | Queen's University, Belfast | |
| 2026 | All-Ireland Ladies' Junior Club Football Championship | Preliminary round | LAN | Oisín | 5-13 | 2-4 | Brussels Craobh Rua | EU | Old Bedians, Didsbury | |
| 2025 | All-Ireland Ladies' Intermediate Club Football Championship | Quarter-final | LON | Holloway Gaels | 0-5 | 0-8 | St Fechins | LOU | Gaelic Grounds, Drogheda | |
| 2025 | All-Ireland Ladies' Junior Club Football Championship | Quarter-final | LON | St Kiernans | 0-0 | 3-10 | Muckalee | KLK | Abbotstown Centre of Excellence, Abbotstown | |
| 2025 | All-Ireland Ladies' Junior Club Football Championship | Preliminary round | LON | St Kiernans | 2-9 | 2-6 | Ar Gwazi Gouez Rennes | EU | La Bellangerais Sport Complex, Rennes | |
| 2024 | All-Ireland Ladies' Intermediate Club Football Championship | Quarter-final | SCO | Dunedin Connollys | 0-8 | 4-11 | Annaghdown | GAL | Granton Road, Edinburgh | |
| 2024 | All-Ireland Ladies' Junior Club Football Championship | Preliminary round | LON | Wandsworth Gaels | 0-7 | 1-6 | Paris-Burdi | EU | McGovern Park, Ruislip | |
| 2023 | All-Ireland Ladies' Intermediate Club Football Championship | Quarter-final | LON | Tír Conaill Gaels | 0-9 | 2-5 | Glanmire | COR | McGovern Park, Ruislip | |
| 2023 | All-Ireland Ladies' Junior Club Football Championship | Quarter-final | SCO | Glaschu Gaels | 2-0 | 2-14 | O'Donovan Rossa | COR | Clydebank Sports Hub, Clydebank | |
| 2023 | All-Ireland Ladies' Junior Club Football Championship | Preliminary round | SCO | Glaschu Gaels | 1-7 | 0-1 | Brussels Craobh Rua | EU | Sportpark West, Maastricht | |
| 2022 | All-Ireland Ladies' Intermediate Club Football Championship | Quarter-final | LON | Round Towers | 1-8 | 4-13 | Derrygonnelly Harps | FER | McGovern Park, Ruislip | |
| 2022 | All-Ireland Ladies' Junior Club Football Championship | Preliminary round | YOR | Hugh O'Neills | 0-8 | 2-6 | Brussels Craobh Rua | EU | Páirc Beeston, Leeds | |
| 2021-22 | All-Ireland Ladies' Intermediate Club Football Championship | Quarter-final | LON | Holloway Gaels | 0-5 | 2-12 | St Sylvesters | DUB | Malahide, Dublin | |
| 2021-22 | All-Ireland Ladies' Junior Club Football Championship | Quarter-final | YOR | Tír na nÓg | 0-5 | 9-18 | St Judes | DUB | St Margaret's, Ballystrahan | |
| 2020 | cancelled due to COVID-19 pandemic | | | | | | | | | |
| 2019 | All-Ireland Ladies' Intermediate Club Football Championship | Quarter-final | LON | Parnells | 0-4 | 1-17 | St Nathys | SLI | McGovern Park, Ruislip | |
| 2019 | All-Ireland Ladies' Junior Club Football Championship | Quarter-final | LAN | Oisín | 1-10 | 7-7 | Lahardane MacHales | MAY | Old Bedians, Didsbury | |
| 2019 | All-Ireland Ladies' Junior Club Football Championship | Preliminary round | LAN | Oisín | 3-19 | 1-7 | Belgium Gaels | EU | Sportpark West, Maastricht | |
| 2018 | All-Ireland Ladies' Intermediate Club Football Championship | Semi final | SCO | Dunedin Connollys | 1-9 | 4-10 | Aghabog Emmets | MON | Aghabog, Lismagonway | |
| 2018 | All-Ireland Ladies' Intermediate Club Football Championship | Quarter-final | SCO | Dunedin Connollys | 2-11 | 2-9 | Na Gaeil | KER | Granton Road, Edinburgh | |
| 2018 | All-Ireland Ladies' Junior Club Football Championship | Quarter-final | WAR | Roger Casements | 1-1 | 5-21 | Glanmire | COR | Páirc na nÉireann, Solihull | |
| 2018 | All-Ireland Ladies' Junior Club Football Championship | Preliminary round | WAR | Roger Casements | 5-11 | 0-6 | Belgium Gaels | EU | Páirc na nÉireann, Solihull | |
| 2017 | All-Ireland Ladies' Intermediate Club Football Championship | Quarter-final | LAN | John Mitchels | 1-10 | 3-7 | Latton O'Rahilly | MON | Greenbank Lane, Liverpool | |
| 2017 | All-Ireland Ladies' Junior Club Football Championship | Quarter-final | LON | Kingdom Kerry Gaels | 1-10 | 2-15 | Corduff | MON | McGovern Park, Ruislip | |
| 2017 | All-Ireland Ladies' Junior Club Football Championship | Preliminary round | LON | Kingdom Kerry Gaels | 4-17 | 2-8 | Belgium Gaels | EU | Sportpark West, Maastricht | |
| 2016 | All-Ireland Ladies' Intermediate Club Football Championship | Semi-final | LON | Parnells | 1-10 | 3-7 | Shane O'Neills | ARM | Pairc Sheain Ui Neill, Camlough | |
| 2016 | All-Ireland Ladies' Intermediate Club Football Championship | Quarter-final | LON | Parnells | 3-11 | 1-5 | Naomh Ciaran | OFF | Tír Chonaill Park, Greenford | |
| 2016 | All-Ireland Ladies' Junior Club Football Championship | Quarter-final | SCO | Glaschu Gaels | 1-7 | 4-15 | St Maurs | DUB | Clydebank Sports Hub, Clydebank | |
| 2016 | All-Ireland Ladies' Junior Club Football Championship | Preliminary round | SCO | Glaschu Gaels | 4-12 | 4-6 | Brussels Craobh Rua | EU | Clydebank Sports Hub, Clydebank | |
| 2015 | All-Ireland Ladies' Intermediate Club Football Championship | Quarter-final | SCO | Dunedin Connollys | 1-6 | 1-8 | Glenamaddy/Williamstown | GAL | Granton Road, Edinburgh | |
| 2015 | All-Ireland Ladies' Junior Club Football Championship | Quarter-final | LAN | Oisín | 1-9 | 2-10 | Maigh Cuilinn | GAL | Old Bedians, Didsbury | |
| 2015 | All-Ireland Ladies' Junior Club Football Championship | Preliminary round | LAN | Oisín | 2-16 | 2-3 | Brussels Craobh Rua | EU | Sportpark West, Maastricht | |
| 2014 | All-Ireland Ladies' Senior Club Football Championship | Quarter-final | LON | Parnells | 0-11 | 6-12 | Mourneabbey | COR | McGovern Park, Ruislip | |
| 2014 | All-Ireland Ladies' Intermediate Club Football Championship | Quarter-final | SCO | Dunedin Connollys | 2-6 | 2-14 | Castleisland Desmonds | KER | Granton Road, Edinburgh | |
| 2014 | All-Ireland Ladies' Junior Club Football Championship | Preliminary round | LAN | Liverpool Wolfe Tones | 1-2 | 1-11 | Brussels Craobh Rua | EU | Páirc na nÉireann, Solihull | |
| 2013 | All-Ireland Ladies' Senior Club Football Championship | Quarter-final | LON | Parnells | 1-3 | 5-14 | Mountmellick | LAO | Tír Chonaill Park, Greenford | |
| 2013 | All-Ireland Ladies' Intermediate Club Football Championship | Quarter-final | LON | Fr Murphys | 0-5 | 1-8 | Glen | DER | Tír Chonaill Park, Greenford | |
| 2013 | All-Ireland Ladies' Junior Club Football Championship | Final | SCO | Dunedin Connollys | 1-5 | 2-26 | Na Gaeil | KER | Crettyard, Laois | |
| 2013 | All-Ireland Ladies' Junior Club Football Championship | Semi-final | SCO | Dunedin Connollys | 5-5 | 0-12 | St Helens | LNG | Monaduff, Drumlish | |
| 2013 | All-Ireland Ladies' Junior Club Football Championship | Quarter-final | SCO | Dunedin Connollys | 7-16 | 8-8 | Shane O'Neills | ARM | Granton Road, Edinburgh | |
| 2012 | All-Ireland Ladies' Intermediate Club Football Championship | Final | LON | Parnells | 3-11 | 2-4 | Cahir | TIP | Bishopsland, Ballymore | |
| 2012 | All-Ireland Ladies' Intermediate Club Football Championship | Semi-final replay | LON | Parnells | 3-11 | 2-8 | Kilkerrin-Clonberne | GAL | St Oliver Plunkett Park, Emyvale | |
| 2012 | All-Ireland Ladies' Intermediate Club Football Championship | Semi-final | LON | Parnells | 1-12 | 1-12 | Kilkerrin-Clonberne | GAL | Creggs Rosd, Glenamaddy | |
| 2012 | All-Ireland Ladies' Intermediate Club Football Championship | Quarter-final | LON | Parnells | 3-11 | 2-4 | St Laurences | KLD | McGovern Park, Ruislip | |
| 2012 | All-Ireland Ladies' Junior Club Football Championship | Quarter-final | LON | Holloway Gaels | 0-3 | 4-16 | Thomas Davis | DUB | McGovern Park, Ruislip | |
| 2011 | All-Ireland Ladies' Intermediate Club Football Championship | Semi-final | LON | Parnells | 1-9 | 0-13 | Lisnaskea Emmetts | FER | Emmett Park, Enniskillen | |
| 2011 | All-Ireland Ladies' Intermediate Club Football Championship | Quarter-final | LON | Parnells | 3-13 | 1-10 | Caltra | GAL | McGovern Park, Ruislip | |
| 2011 | All-Ireland Ladies' Junior Club Football Championship | Quarter-final | LON | Fulham Irish | 1-1 | 2-19 | Claregalway | GAL | McGovern Park, Ruislip | |
| 2010 | All-Ireland Ladies' Intermediate Club Football Championship | Quarter-final | LON | Parnells | 4-12 | 2-8 | West Clare Gaels | CLA | McGovern Park, Ruislip | |
| 2010 | All-Ireland Ladies' Junior Club Football Championship | Quarter-final | LAN | Oisín | 1-4 | 1-12 | Moyle Rovers | TIP | Old Bedians, Didsbury | |
| 2009 | All-Ireland Ladies' Intermediate Club Football Championship | Quarter-final | LON | Fr Murphys | 1-5 | 1-6 | St Pauls | ANT | McGovern Park, Ruislip | |
| 2009 | All-Ireland Ladies' Junior Club Football Championship | Quarter-final | LON | Kingdom Kerry Gaels | 2-3 | 4-9 | Corduff | MON | Tír Chonaill Park, Greenford | |
| 2008 | All-Ireland Ladies' Intermediate Club Football Championship | Quarter-final | LON | Fr Murphys | 0-7 | 1-7 | Killoe | LNG | McGovern Park, Ruislip | |
| 2008 | All-Ireland Ladies' Junior Club Football Championship | Quarter-final | LAN | John Mitchels | 1-4 | 3-8 | Maynooth | KLD | Greenbank Lane, Liverpool | |
| 2007 | All-Ireland Ladies' Intermediate Club Football Championship | Quarter-final | LON | Fr Murphys | 1-11 | 3-12 | St Nathys | SLI | McGovern Park, Ruislip | |
| 2007 | All-Ireland Ladies' Junior Club Football Championship | Quarter-final | LAN | John Mitchels | 0-5 | 1-9 | Curry | SLI | Greenbank Lane, Liverpool | |
| 2006 | All-Ireland Ladies' Intermediate Club Football Championship | Semi-final | LON | Parnells | 1-3 | 1-14 | Inch Rovers | COR | McGovern Park, Ruislip | |
| 2006 | All-Ireland Ladies' Junior Club Football Championship | Semi-final | WAR | John Mitchels | 1-6 | 5-17 | Emyvale | MON | Páirc na nÉireann, Solihull | |
| 2005 | All-Ireland Ladies' Intermediate Club Football Championship | Semi-final | LON | Parnells | 0-6 | 5-20 | Abbeydorney | KER | Ballyduff, Tralee | |
| 2005 | All-Ireland Ladies' Junior Club Football Championship | Semi-final | LON | Tara | 1-3 | 4-23 | Mourneabbey | COR | Dr Mannix Sportsfield, Charleville | |
| 2004 | All-Ireland Ladies' Intermediate Club Football Championship | Semi-final | LON | Parnells | 2-6 | 2-11 | Tyholland | MON | | |
| 2004 | All-Ireland Ladies' Junior Club Football Championship | Semi-final | LAN | Emerald Gaels | 0-4 | 5-18 | Inniskeen | MON | Fingallians, Dublin | |
| 2003 | All-Ireland Ladies' Intermediate Club Football Championship | Final | LON | Parnells | 1-7 | 3-6 | Naomh Abán | COR | McCann Road, Portarlington | |
| 2003 | All-Ireland Ladies' Intermediate Club Football Championship | Semi-final | LON | Parnells | 2-3 | 1-3 | Na Fianna | DUB | | |
| 2003 | All-Ireland Ladies' Junior Club Football Championship | Semi-final | LAN | Emerald Gaels | 1-1 | 6-14 | Fingallians | DUB | | |
| 2002 | All-Ireland Ladies' Senior Club Football Championship | Semi-final | LON | Parnells | 1-2 | 2-17 | Carrickmore | TYR | McGovern Park, Ruislip | |
| 2002 | All-Ireland Ladies' Junior Club Football Championship | Semi-final | LAN | Emerald Gaels | 1-2 | 3-18 | Tyholland | MON | Old Bedians, Didsbury | |

=== Inter-varsity level ===
==== British University Ladies' Football Championship roll of honour ====
- 1998 St Mary's University, Twickenham
- 1999 St Mary's University, Twickenham
- 2000 St Mary's University, Twickenham
- 2001 St Mary's University, Twickenham
- 2002 St Mary's University, Twickenham
- 2003 St Mary's University, Twickenham
- 2004 St Mary's University, Twickenham
- 2005 St Mary's University, Twickenham
- 2006 Liverpool Hope University
- 2007 Liverpool Hope University
- 2008 Liverpool Hope University
- 2009 Queen Margaret University
- 2010 Robert Gordon University
- 2011 St Mary's University, Twickenham
- 2012 St Mary's University, Twickenham
- 2013 Robert Gordon University
- 2014 Robert Gordon University
- 2015 Liverpool Hope University
- 2016 Queen Margaret University
- 2017 St Mary's University, Twickenham
- 2018 Liverpool Hope University
- 2019 Liverpool John Moores University
- 2020 not played
- 2021 not played
- 2022 University of Liverpool
- 2023 University of Liverpool
- 2024 Coventry University
- 2025 Coventry University
- 2026 University of Liverpool

==== British University Ladies' Football Championship wins by university ====
| University | Wins |
|---|---|
| St Mary's University, Twickenham | 11 |
| Liverpool Hope University | 5 |
| University of Liverpool | 3 |
| Robert Gordon University | 3 |
| Coventry University | 2 |
| Queen Margaret University | 2 |
| Liverpool John Moores University | 1 |

== Hurling ==
=== Overview of competitions ===
| County board | County | Club (provincial) | | Club (county) | |
| County board | County | Senior | Intermediate | Senior | Intermediate |
|---|---|---|---|---|---|
| Gloucestershire | | | | | |
Hertfordshire
| Lancashire | National Hurling League / Lory Meagher Cup | All-Britain Club Hurling Championship / Ulster Junior Club Hurling Championship / All-Ireland Junior Club Hurling Championship | | Lancashire Senior Hurling Championship | |
| London | National Hurling League / Joe McDonagh Cup | Connacht Intermediate Club Hurling Championship / All-Ireland Intermediate Club Hurling Championship | All-Britain Club Hurling Championship / Ulster Junior Club Hurling Championship / All-Ireland Junior Club Hurling Championship | London Senior Hurling Championship | London Intermediate Hurling Championship |
| Scotland | | All-Britain Club Hurling Championship / Ulster Junior Club Hurling Championship / All-Ireland Junior Club Hurling Championship | | Lancashire Senior Hurling Championship | |
| Warwickshire | National Hurling League / Lory Meagher Cup | All-Britain Club Hurling Championship / Ulster Junior Club Hurling Championship / All-Ireland Junior Club Hurling Championship | | Warwickshire Senior Hurling Championship | |
| Yorkshire | | All-Britain Club Hurling Championship / Ulster Junior Club Hurling Championship / All-Ireland Junior Club Hurling Championship | | Lancashire Senior Hurling Championship | |

=== Inter-county level ===
London, Lancashire, and Warwickshire each have county hurling teams playing in the National Hurling League, with London currently in Division 2 and both Lancashire and Warwickshire in Division 4 (as of the end of the 2026 season). All three teams also compete within the All-Ireland hurling pyramid, with 2027 seeing London in the Christy Ring Cup and both Warwickshire and Lancashire in the Lory Meagher Cup.

London are the only county from outside of Ireland to win an All-Ireland Senior Hurling Championship, doing so in 1901 by beating Cork in the final. More recently, London have recorded trophies in the Christy Ring and Nicky Rackard Cups, cementing their place as a mid-tier hurling county. Warwickshire and Lancashire have seen more mixed fortunes; Warwickshire have won the Lory Meagher Cup on two occasions, and gone contested a Nicky Rackard Cup final, while Lancashire have never won a trophy in the All-Ireland pyramid, coming runner-up in the Lory Meagher Cup on three occasions.

==== All-Britain Hurling Championship roll of honour ====
- 1927 Britain
- 1928
- 1929
- 1930
- 1931 Lancashire
- 1932 London
- 1933 London
- 1934 London
- 1935 London
- 1936 International
- 1937 London
- 1938 London
- 1939 London
- 1940 Lancashire
- 1941-45 not played
- 1946 London
- 1947 London
- 1948 London
- 1949 London
- 1950 London
- 1951 London
- 1952 London
- 1953 Warwickshire
- 1954 London
- 1955 Warwickshire
- 1956 London
- 1957 London
- 1958 Warwickshire
- 1959 London
- 1960 London
- 1961 London
- 1962 London
- 1963 London
- 1964 London
- 1965 Warwickshire
- 1966 Warwickshire
- 1967 London
- 1968 Warwickshire
- 1969 Warwickshire
- 1970 Hertfordshire
- 1971 Hertfordshire
- 1972 Warwickshire
- 1973 Warwickshire
- 1974 Hertfordshire
- 1975 Hertfordshire
- 1976 London
- 1977 London
- 1978 London
- 1979 London
- 1980 London
- 1981 London
- 1982 London
- 1983 London
- 1984 London
- 1985 London
- 1986 London
- 1987 London
- 1988 London
- 1989 Hertfordshire
- 1990 Hertfordshire
- 1991 Hertfordshire
- 1992
- 1993
- 1994
- 1995
- 1996
- 1997
- 1998
- 1999
- 2000 London
- 2001 London
- 2002 London
- 2003 Warwickshire
- 2004 London

=== Club level ===
The All-Britain Club Hurling Championship is a national competition contested by the senior champions in Warwickshire and Lancashire (the latter of which contains Yorkshire and Scottish teams), and the winner of the London Intermediate Hurling Championship.The winner of the All-Britain entered the quarter finals of the All-Ireland Junior Club Hurling Championship up until the 2024-25 season, where they began entering the Ulster Junior Club Hurling Championship via the "twinning final". The winner of the London Senior Hurling Championship entered the quarter-finals of the All-Ireland Intermediate Club Hurling Championship up until the 2018-19 season, where they began entering the Connacht Intermediate Club Hurling Championship at the semi-final stage.

One team, Robert Emmetts, has won an All-Ireland, with victory in the intermediate championships in the 2006-07 season, while St Gabriels and Kilburn Gaels have both been runners-up in the competition. Despite Fullen Gaels' dominance in the All-Britain through the 2010s, winning seven championships in a row between 2010 and 2016, they only managed a peak of runners-up finishes in the All-Ireland competition, on two occasions.

==== Performance of British clubs in All-Ireland Club Hurling Championships ====
| Year | Competition | Round | British club | | Score | | Irish club | | Venue | Source |
| Year | Competition | Round | County | Name | Score | | Name | County | Venue | Source |
|---|---|---|---|---|---|---|---|---|---|---|
| 2026-27 | Connacht Intermediate Club Hurling Championship | Semi-final | LON | Brothers Pearse | 1-14 | 3-32 | Tooreen | MAY | McGovern Park, Ruislip | |
| 2025-26 | Connacht Intermediate Club Hurling Championship | Semi-final | LON | St Gabriel's | 0-8 | 3-21 | Tooreen | MAY | McGovern Park, Ruislip | |
| 2025-26 | Ulster Junior Club Hurling Championship | Twinning final | LON | Thomas McCurtains | 0-17 | 1-15 | Burt | DON | McGovern Park, Ruislip | |
| 2024-25 | Connacht Intermediate Club Hurling Championship | Semi-final | LON | St Gabriel's | 1-12 | 1-22 | Tooreen | MAY | Dr Hyde Park, Roscommon | |
| 2024-25 | Ulster Junior Club Hurling Championship | Twinning final | LON | Fr. Murphy's | 0-6 | 1-17 | Ballinascreen | DER | Owenbeg Centre of Excellence, Derry | |
| 2023-24 | All-Ireland Junior Club Hurling Championship | Quarter-final | LON | Seán Treacy's | 3-18 | 5-24 | Castleblayney | MON | McGovern Park, Ruislip | |
| 2022-23 | Connacht Intermediate Club Hurling Championship | Semi-final | LON | St Gabriel's | 1-12 | 1-17 | Tooreen | MAY | Waldron Park, Athleague | |
| 2022-23 | All-Ireland Junior Club Hurling Championship | Semi-final | LON | Kilburn Gaels | 4-6 | 3-15 | Easkey | SLI | Louth GAA Centre of Excellence, Darver | |
| 2022-23 | All-Ireland Junior Club Hurling Championship | Quarter-final | LON | Kilburn Gaels | 3-12 | 0-17 | Setanta | DON | Carrickmore Grounds, Carrickmore | |
| 2021-22 | Connacht Intermediate Club Hurling Championship | Semi-final | LON | Robert Emmetts | 1-12 | 1-19 | Tooreen | MAY | McGovern Park, Ruislip | |
| 2021-22 | All-Ireland Junior Club Hurling Championship | Semi-final | LAN | Fullen Gaels | 0-12 | 4-20 | Ballygiblin | COR | O'Moore Park, Portlaoise | |
| 2021-22 | All-Ireland Junior Club Hurling Championship | Quarter-final | LAN | Fullen Gaels | 2-17pen | 2-17 | Craobh Rua | ARM | Páirc na nÉireann, Solihull | |
| 2020-21 | cancelled due to COVID-19 pandemic | | | | | | | | | |
| 2019-20 | Connacht Intermediate Club Hurling Championship | Semi-final | LON | Robert Emmetts | 1-23_{aet} | 0-30 | Tooreen | MAY | Waldron Park, Athleague | |
| 2019-20 | All-Ireland Junior Club Hurling Championship | Quarter-final | WAR | John Mitchels | 0-7 | 3-19 | Eoghan Rua | DER | Celtic Park, Derry | |
| 2018-19 | Connacht Intermediate Club Hurling Championship | Semi-final | LON | St Gabriel's | 1-13 | 0-18 | Tooreen | MAY | McGovern Park, Ruislip | |
| 2018-19 | All-Ireland Junior Club Hurling Championship | Quarter-final | WAR | John Mitchels | 1-10 | 2-11 | Castleblayney | MON | Páirc na nÉireann, Solihull | |
| 2017-18 | All-Ireland Intermediate Club Hurling Championship | Quarter-final | LON | Kilburn Gaels | 2-8 | 2-17 | Kanturk | COR | McGovern Park, Ruislip | |
| 2017-18 | All-Ireland Junior Club Hurling Championship | Quarter-final | LON | Brothers Pearse | 2-9 | 0-18 | Fethard St Mogues | WEX | McGovern Park, Ruislip | |
| 2016-17 | All-Ireland Intermediate Club Hurling Championship | Semi-final | LON | Robert Emmetts | 1-9 | 0-18 | Carrickshock | KLK | O'Moore Park, Portlaoise | |
| 2016-17 | All-Ireland Intermediate Club Hurling Championship | Quarter-final | LON | Robert Emmetts | 0-16_{aet} | 0-14 | St Brigids | ANT | Tír Chonaill Park, Greenford | |
| 2016-17 | All-Ireland Junior Club Hurling Championship | Quarter-final | LAN | Fullen Gaels | 0-9 | 2-12 | Calry-St. Joseph's | SLI | Páirc na nÉireann, Solihull | |
| 2015-16 | All-Ireland Intermediate Club Hurling Championship | Quarter-final | LON | Robert Emmetts | 0-5 | 0-10 | Abbeyknockmoy | GAL | McGovern Park, Ruislip | |
| 2015-16 | All-Ireland Junior Club Hurling Championship | Quarter-final | LAN | Fullen Gaels | 0-6 | 1-11 | Eoghan Rua | DER | Páirc na nÉireann, Solihull | |
| 2014-15 | All-Ireland Intermediate Club Hurling Championship | Final | LON | Kilburn Gaels | 2-3 | 1-9 | O'Donovan Rossa | ANT | Croke Park, Dublin | |
| 2014-15 | All-Ireland Intermediate Club Hurling Championship | Semi-final | LON | Kilburn Gaels | 0-11 | 0-10 | Cappataggle | GAL | Gaelic Grounds, Limerick | |
| 2014-15 | All-Ireland Intermediate Club Hurling Championship | Quarter-final | LON | Kilburn Gaels | 1-10 | 1-8 | Mullinavat | KLK | McGovern Park, Ruislip | |
| 2014-15 | All-Ireland Junior Club Hurling Championship | Final | LAN | Fullen Gaels | 1-8 | 3-19 | Bennettsbridge | KLK | Croke Park, Dublin | |
| 2014-15 | All-Ireland Junior Club Hurling Championship | Semi-final | LAN | Fullen Gaels | 2-18 | 1-7 | Castleblayney | MON | Coolock, Dublin | |
| 2014-15 | All-Ireland Junior Club Hurling Championship | Quarter-final | LAN | Fullen Gaels | 2-6 | 0-10 | Modeligo | WAT | Páirc na hÉireann, Solihull | |
| 2013-14 | All-Ireland Intermediate Club Hurling Championship | Quarter-final | LON | St Gabriel's | 0-9 | 0-14 | Youghal | COR | McGovern Park, Ruislip | |
| 2013-14 | All-Ireland Junior Club Hurling Championship | Semi-final | LAN | Fullen Gaels | 1-8 | 2-10 | Creggan Kickhams | ANT | Páirc Esler, Newry | |
| 2013-14 | All-Ireland Junior Club Hurling Championship | Quarter-final | LAN | Fullen Gaels | 1-8 | 0-10 | Ballinamere | OFF | Páirc na hÉireann, Solihull | |
| 2012-13 | All-Ireland Intermediate Club Hurling Championship | Final | LON | St Gabriel's | 0-11 | 1-16 | Clara | KLK | Croke Park, Dublin | |
| 2012-13 | All-Ireland Intermediate Club Hurling Championship | Semi-final | LON | St Gabriel's | 2-12_{aet} | 2-11 | Killimordaly | GAL | St Brendan's Park, Birr | |
| 2012-13 | All-Ireland Intermediate Club Hurling Championship | Quarter-final | LON | St Gabriel's | 4-17 | 2-7 | Lisbellaw St Patrick's | FER | McGovern Park, Ruislip | |
| 2012-13 | All-Ireland Junior Club Hurling Championship | Final | LAN | Fullen Gaels | 2-14 | 2-17 | Thomastown | KLK | Croke Park, Dublin | |
| 2012-13 | All-Ireland Junior Club Hurling Championship | Semi-final | LAN | Fullen Gaels | 1-12 | 1-4 | Bredagh | DOW | Coolock, Dublin | |
| 2012-13 | All-Ireland Junior Club Hurling Championship | Quarter-final | LAN | Fullen Gaels | 0-17_{aet} | 0-12 | Calry-St. Joseph's | SLI | Páirc na hÉireann, Solihull | |
| 2011-12 | All-Ireland Intermediate Club Hurling Championship | Semi-final | LON | Robert Emmetts | 0-11 | 0-13 | Mount Leinster Rangers | CAR | Parnell Park, Dublin | |
| 2011-12 | All-Ireland Intermediate Club Hurling Championship | Quarter-final | LON | Robert Emmetts | 1-12 | 2-7 | Moycullen | GAL | McGovern Park, Ruislip | |
| 2011-12 | All-Ireland Junior Club Hurling Championship | Semi-final | LAN | Fullen Gaels | 0-6 | 1-17 | Charleville | COR | Walsh Park, Waterford | |
| 2011-12 | All-Ireland Junior Club Hurling Championship | Quarter-final | LAN | Fullen Gaels | 4-8 | 2-7 | Burt | DON | Páirc na hÉireann, Solihull | |
| 2010-11 | All-Ireland Intermediate Club Hurling Championship | Quarter-final | LON | Kilburn Gaels | 2-4 | 2-13 | Dicksboro | KLK | McGovern Park, Ruislip | |
| 2010-11 | All-Ireland Junior Club Hurling Championship | Quarter-final | LAN | Fullen Gaels | 0-8 | 2-15 | Meelin | COR | Páirc na hÉireann, Solihull | |
| 2009-10 | All-Ireland Intermediate Club Hurling Championship | Quarter-final | LON | St Gabriel's | 0-6 | 3-15 | South Liberties | LIM | McGovern Park, Ruislip | |
| 2009-10 | All-Ireland Junior Club Hurling Championship | Quarter-final | WAR | John Mitchel's | 0-2 | 4-19 | Blacks and Whites | KLK | Nowlan Park, Kilkenny | |
| 2008-09 | All-Ireland Intermediate Club Hurling Championship | Quarter-final | LON | Robert Emmetts | 0-10 | 3-7 | Gort na Móna | ANT | Casement Park, Belfast | |
| 2008-09 | All-Ireland Junior Club Hurling Championship | Quarter-final | WAR | John Mitchel's | 2-2 | 2-10 | Skehana | GAL | Duggan Park, Galway | |
| 2007-08 | All-Ireland Intermediate Club Hurling Championship | Quarter-final | LON | Robert Emmetts | 0-4 | 0-14 | Tommy Larkin's | GAL | McGovern Park, Ruislip | |
| 2007-08 | All-Ireland Junior Club Hurling Championship | Quarter-final | WAR | John Mitchel's | 1-6 | 1-10 | Glen Rovers Armoy | ANT | Musgrave Park, Belfast | |
| 2006-07 | All-Ireland Intermediate Club Hurling Championship | Final | LON | Robert Emmetts | 1-14 | 0-8 | Killimordaly | GAL | Croke Park, Dublin | |
| 2006-07 | All-Ireland Intermediate Club Hurling Championship | Semi-final | LON | Robert Emmetts | 3-7 | 1-12 | Clooney-Quin | CLA | Gaelic Grounds, Limerick | |
| 2006-07 | All-Ireland Intermediate Club Hurling Championship | Quarter-final | LON | Robert Emmetts | 2-14_{aet} | 2-11 | Ardclough | KIL | St Conleth's Park, Kildare | |
| 2006-07 | All-Ireland Junior Club Hurling Championship | Quarter-final | LON | Granuaile | 0-6 | 5-13 | Kilworth | COR | Meelick Sports Field, Galway | |
| 2005-06 | All-Ireland Intermediate Club Hurling Championship | Quarter-final | LON | Fr. Murphy's | 1-9 | 1-16 | Ballinhassig | COR | McGovern Park, Ruislip | |
| 2005-06 | All-Ireland Junior Club Hurling Championship | Quarter-final | LON | Thomas McCurtains | 3-3 | 2-9 | Castleblayney | MON | St Mary's Park, Castleblayney | |
| 2004-05 | All-Ireland Intermediate Club Hurling Championship | Semi-final | LON | Robert Emmetts | 0-5 | 2-12 | Carrickshock | KLK | Bennettsbridge, Kilkenny | |
| 2004-05 | All-Ireland Intermediate Club Hurling Championship | Quarter-final | LON | Robert Emmetts | 0-9 | 1-3 | Carey Faughs | ANT | McGovern Park, Ruislip | |
| 2003-04 | All-Ireland Senior Club Hurling Championship | Quarter-final | LON | Fr Murphy's | 1-5 | 1-14 | Newtownshandrum | COR | McGovern Park, Ruislip | |
| 2002-03 | All-Ireland Senior Club Hurling Championship | Quarter-final | LON | Seán Treacy's | 0-5 | 4-15 | Athenry | GAL | McGovern Park, Ruislip | |
| 2001-02 | All-Ireland Senior Club Hurling Championship | Quarter-final | LON | Fr Murphy's | 1-6 | 6-12 | Dunloy | ANT | McGovern Park, Ruislip | |
| 2000-01 | All-Ireland Senior Club Hurling Championship | Quarter-final | LON | Fr Murphy's | 0-6 | 2-11 | Sixmilebridge | CLA | McGovern Park, Ruislip | |
| 1999-2000 | All-Ireland Senior Club Hurling Championship | Quarter-final | LON | St Gabriel's | 1-9 | 2-19 | Athenry | GAL | McGovern Park, Ruislip | |
| 1998-99 | All-Ireland Senior Club Hurling Championship | Quarter-final | LON | Brothers Pearse | 0-4 | 1-9 | Ballygalget | DOW | McGovern Park, Ruislip | |
| 1997-98 | All-Ireland Senior Club Hurling Championship | Quarter-final | LON | St Gabriel's | 1-7 | 2-24 | Clarecastle | CLA | McGovern Park, Ruislip | |
| 1996-97 | All-Ireland Senior Club Hurling Championship | Quarter-final | LON | St Gabriel's | 1-8 | 3-15 | Athenry | GAL | McGovern Park, Ruislip | |
| 1995-96 | All-Ireland Senior Club Hurling Championship | Quarter-final | LON | St Gabriel's | 0-9 | 1-16 | Dunloy | ANT | McGovern Park, Ruislip | |
| 1994-95 | All-Ireland Senior Club Hurling Championship | Quarter-final | LON | Seán Treacy's | 0-10 | 1-16 | Kilmallock | LIM | McGovern Park, Ruislip | |
| 1993-94 | All-Ireland Senior Club Hurling Championship | Quarter-final | LON | Seán Treacy's | 0-5 | 2-14 | Sarsfields | GAL | McGovern Park, Ruislip | |
| 1992-93 | All-Ireland Senior Club Hurling Championship | Semi-final | LON | Desmonds | 0-6 | 1-16 | Kilmallock | LIM | FitzGerald Park, Kilmallock | |
| 1992-93 | All-Ireland Senior Club Hurling Championship | Quarter-final | LON | Desmonds | 2-7 | 1-8 | Ruairí Óg Cushendall | ANT | McGovern Park, Ruislip | |
| 1991-92 | All-Ireland Senior Club Hurling Championship | Quarter-final | LON | Seán Treacy's | 0-6 | 0-23 | Cashel King Cormacs | TIP | McGovern Park, Ruislip | |
| 1990-91 | All-Ireland Senior Club Hurling Championship | Semi-final | LON | St Gabriel's | 3-6 | 8-12 | Patrickswell | LIM | Gaelic Grounds | |
| 1990-91 | All-Ireland Senior Club Hurling Championship | Quarter-final | LON | St Gabriel's | 2-11 | 1-12 | Kiltormer | GAL | Kenny Park, Athenry | |
| 1989-90 | All-Ireland Senior Club Hurling Championship | Quarter-final | LON | Desmonds | 2-10 | 3-12 | Loughgiel Shamrocks | ANT | Fr Healy Park, Loughgiel | |
| 1988-89 | All-Ireland Senior Club Hurling Championship | Quarter-final | LON | Desmonds | 0-7 | 2-15 | Patrickswell | LIM | Gaelic Grounds | |
| 1987-88 | All-Ireland Senior Club Hurling Championship | Quarter-final | HER | Glen Rovers Watford | 0-5 | 2-14 | Athenry | GAL | Dunlo GAA Grounds, Ballinasloe | |
| 1986-87 | All-Ireland Senior Club Hurling Championship | Quarter-final | LON | St Gabriel's | 1-6 | 4-14 | McQuillans Ballycastle | ANT | Pearse Park, Dunloy | |
| 1985-86 | All-Ireland Senior Club Hurling Championship | Quarter-final | LON | Desmonds | 0-4 | 2-9 | Kilruane MacDonagh's | TIP | MacDonagh Park, Tipperary | |
| 1984-85 | All-Ireland Senior Club Hurling Championship | Quarter-final | LON | St Gabriel's | 0-3 | 4-12 | Castlegar | GAL | Pearse Stadium, Galway | |
| 1983-84 | All-Ireland Senior Club Hurling Championship | Quarter-final | LON | Desmonds | 0-8 | 3-7 | McQuillans Ballycastle | ANT | St Patricks, Ballyvoy | |
| 1982-83 | All-Ireland Senior Club Hurling Championship | Quarter-final | LON | Brian Borus | 0-5 | 3-5 | Moycarkey–Borris | TIP | Semple Stadium, Thurles | |
| 1981-82 | All-Ireland Senior Club Hurling Championship | Quarter-final | LON | St Gabriel's | 0-9 | 4-12 | Gort | GAL | Dunlo GAA Grounds, Ballinasloe | |
| 1980-81 | All-Ireland Senior Club Hurling Championship | Quarter-final | LON | Brian Boru | 2-4 | 1-14 | McQuillans Ballycastle | ANT | Páirc Mac Uílín, Ballycastle | |
| 1979-80 | All-Ireland Senior Club Hurling Championship | Quarter-final | LON | Brian Boru | 1-10 | 4-15 | Blackrock | COR | Páirc Uí Chaoimh, Cork | |
| 1978-79 | All-Ireland Senior Club Hurling Championship | Semi-final | LON | St Gabriel's | 1-7 | 4-10 | Ballyhale Shamrocks | KLK | Nowlan Park, Kilkenny | |
| 1978-79 | All-Ireland Senior Club Hurling Championship | Quarter-final (replay) | LON | St Gabriel's | 2-9 | 0-10 | Ardrahan | GAL | Páirc Ciaráin | |
| 1978-79 | All-Ireland Senior Club Hurling Championship | Quarter-final (draw) | LON | St Gabriel's | 2-5 | 1-8 | Ardrahan | GAL | Pearse Stadium, Galway | |
| 1977-78 | All-Ireland Senior Club Hurling Championship | Quarter-final | LON | St Gabriel's | 1-9 | 2-11 | O'Donovan Rossa | ANT | Corrigan Park, Belfast | |
| 1976-77 | All-Ireland Senior Club Hurling Championship | Quarter-final | LON | St Gabriel's | 1-6 | 1-13 | Glen Rovers | COR | Páirc Uí Chaoimh, Cork | |
| 1975-76 | All-Ireland Senior Club Hurling Championship | Quarter-final | LON | Brian Boru | 0-5 | 0-7 | Ardrahan | GAL | Dunlo GAA Grounds, Ballinasloe | |

=== Inter-varsity level ===
==== British University Hurling Championship roll of honour ====
- 2001/02 Abertay University
- 2002/03 University of Dundee
- 2003/04 University of Dundee
- 2004/05 University of Glamorgan
- 2005/06 University of Dundee
- 2006/07 Edinburgh Napier University
- 2007/08 Edinburgh Napier University
- 2008/09 Edinburgh Napier University
- 2009/10 Edinburgh Napier University
- 2010/11 Edinburgh Napier University
- 2011/12 Edinburgh Napier University
- 2012/13 Edinburgh Napier University
- 2013/14 Edinburgh Napier University
- 2014/15 Liverpool John Moores University
- 2015/16 Robert Gordon University

==== British University Hurling Championship wins by university ====
| University | Wins |
|---|---|
| Edinburgh Napier University | 8 |
| University of Dundee | 3 |
| Abertay University | 1 |
| Liverpool John Moores University | 1 |
| Robert Gordon University | 1 |
| University of Glamorgan | 1 |

== Camogie ==
=== Overview of competitions ===
| County board | Club (provincial) | |
| County board | Senior | Intermediate |
|---|---|---|
| Gloucestershire | | |
Hertfordshire
| Lancashire | All-Britain Senior Camogie Championship / All-Ireland Junior Club Camogie Championship | All-Britain Intermediate Camogie Championship / All-Ireland Junior B Club Camogie Championship |
| London | All-Britain Senior Camogie Championship / All-Ireland Junior Club Camogie Championship | All-Britain Intermediate Camogie Championship / All-Ireland Junior B Club Camogie Championship |
| Scotland | All-Britain Senior Camogie Championship / All-Ireland Junior Club Camogie Championship | All-Britain Intermediate Camogie Championship / All-Ireland Junior B Club Camogie Championship |
| Warwickshire | | All-Britain Intermediate Camogie Championship / All-Ireland Junior B Club Camogie Championship |
| Yorkshire | | |

=== Inter-county level ===
There is currently no inter-county camogie fixtures, but there is plans for a London team to be formed in the near future.

=== Club level ===
==== All-Britain Senior Camogie Championship roll of honour ====
- 2016 Tara
- 2017 Tara
- 2018 Tara
- 2019 Tara
- 2020 not played
- 2021 Tara
- 2022 Tara
- 2023 Tara
- 2024 Tara
- 2025 Fullen Gaels
- 2026 Tara

==== All-Britain Senior Camogie Championship wins by club ====
| Team | County | Wins |
|---|---|---|
| Tara | LON | 9 |
| Fullen Gaels | LAN | 1 |

=== Inter-varsity level ===
There is currently no official inter-varsity camogie fixtures in Britain.

== Notable players ==
=== Players notable for Gaelic games ===
==== Football ====
- Charlie Harrison - St Mary's University, London - Connacht Championship winner with Sligo and 2010 All-Star
- Ciarán Bonner - Tír Chonaill Gaels, London - National Football League winner with Donegal
- Frank Stockwell - London county team only - All-Ireland winner with Galway
- Gene O Driscoll - Geraldines, London / St Marys, London - Munster Championship winner with Kerry
- Jack Shouldice^{†} - Geraldines, London / Hibernians, London - All-Ireland winner with Dublin
- Jody Gormley - Tir Chonaill Gaels/London county team - 2-time Ulster Championship winner with Tyrone
- Mark Bradley - Liverpool Hope University - All-Ireland winner with Tyrone
- Maurice O'Connell - Lancashire county team only - All-Ireland winner with Kerry
- Ollie Murphy - London county team only - 2-time All-Star and 2-time All-Ireland winner, both with Meath
- Paddy McConigley - Tír Chonaill Gaels, London - National Football League winner with Donegal
- Patricia Mimna - Parnells, London - 5-time All-Star, 3 with London and 2 with Laois
- Sam Maguire^{‡} - Hibernians, London - gives his name to the Sam Maguire Cup
- Séamus Flynn - Harps & Shamrocks, Lancashire - Leinster Championship winner with Longford

==== Hurling ====
- Andy Comerford - 2-time All-Star and 3-time All-Ireland winner, both with Kilkenny
- Finbarr Gantley - Warwickshire county team / Brothers Pearse, London / St Gabriels, London - All-Ireland winner with Galway
- Jack Coughlan - London county team only - Captain of the London 1901 All-Ireland winning team
- Jarlath Whelan - Sean McDermotts, London - All-Ireland winner with Kilkenny
- James Hanley - Robert Emmetts, London - All-Ireland winner with Limerick
- Killian Burke - London county team only - Munster Championship winner with Cork
- Liam MacCarthy^{‡} - London county team only - gives his name to the Liam MacCarthy Cup
- Michael Connolly - London county team only - All-Ireland winner with Galway
- Phil Wilson - London county team only - All-Ireland winner with Wexford
- Tom Barry^{‡} - Hibernians, London - Member of the London 1901 All-Ireland winning team

=== Players notable for other sports ===
- Aoife Mannion (football) - Sean McDermotts, Warwickshire
- Bree White (Aussie rules) - London county team only
- Dan Crowley (football) - Roger Casements, Warwickshire
- Edward Barrett (tug-of-war) - London county team only
- Jack Grealish (football) - John Mitchels, Warwickshire
- Niamh Fahey (football) - Parnells, London - All-Ireland winner with Galway
- Seamus Coleman (football) - John Mitchels, Lancashire
- Zinzan Brooke (rugby union) - St Brendans, London

=== Players notable for non-sporting reasons ===
- Chris O'Dowd (comedian) - Garryowen, London
- Michael Collins^{†} (politician) - Geraldines, London
- Nigel Boyle (actor) - Dulwich Harps, London
- Noel Gallagher (musician) - Oisín, Lancashire
- Tinie Tempah (musician) - Dulwich Harps, London
- William Parr^{†} - Lancashire county team only

^{†}Directly involved in the Easter Rising

^{‡}Indirectly involved in the Easter Rising (not in Dublin)
