= All-Britain Club Hurling Championship =

Men's Hurling provincial club competition

- Code: Hurling
- Founded: 1964; 62 years ago
- Region: Britain (GAA)
- Trophy: Billy Collins Cup
- No. of teams: 7
- Title holders: Fr Murphys (London) (5th title)
- Most titles: St Gabriels (London) (12 titles)
- TV partner: 247.tv
- Official website: Gaelic Games Council of Britain

The All-Britain Club Hurling Championship is the hurling provincial club championship competition in Great Britain. The winners of the designated county championship for each British county compete against each other in a knockout format, with the winner declared "All-Britain" champions and qualifying for the All-Ireland Junior Club Hurling Championship. The competition is organised by the Provincial Council of Britain of the Gaelic Athletic Association.

== Teams ==
The winning teams from the championships of Lancashire and Warwickshire compete in the Championship alongside the intermediate champions of London. The London Senior Hurling Championship winners compete in the Connacht Intermediate Club Hurling Championship. The winner of the All-Britain competes against the Ulster junior champions in the "Ulster twinning-final" - this is functionally the same as the All-Ireland quarter-final in the football competitions.

County	Championship	Teams
Gloucestershire	no hurling championship	no hurling teams
Hertfordshire	no hurling championship	no hurling teams
Lancashire	Lancashire Senior Hurling Championship	Fullen Gaels; Liverpool Wolfe Tones
London	London Intermediate Hurling Championship	Cú Chulainns; Fr Murphys; Fulham Irish; Granuaile; Kilburn Gaels; St Gabriels
Scotland	Lancashire Senior Hurling Championship	Ceann Creige
Warwickshire	Warwickshire Senior Hurling Championship	Erin go Bragh; John Mitchels; St Barnabas; St Finbarrs
Yorkshire	Lancashire Senior Hurling Championship	Yorkshire Emeralds

== Roll of honour ==
=== Winners by year ===
- 1964 Brian Boru
- 1965 St Finbarrs
- 1966 St Finbarrs
- 1967 Brian Boru
- 1968 Cuchulainns
- 1969 St Chads
- 1970 Eire Og
- 1971 John Mitchels
- 1972 TBC
- 1973 Brothers Pearse
- 1974 St Gabriels
- 1975 Brian Boru
- 1976 St Gabriels
- 1977 St Gabriels
- 1978 St Gabriels
- 1979 TBC
- 1980 Brian Boru
- 1981 St Gabriels
- 1982 TBC
- 1983 Desmonds
- 1984 St Gabriels
- 1985 Desmonds
- 1986 St Gabriels
- 1987 TBC
- 1988 Desmonds
- 1989 Desmonds
- 1990 St Gabriels
- 1991 Sean Treacys
- 1992 Desmonds
- 1993 Sean Treacys
- 1994 Sean Treacys
- 1995 St Gabriels
- 1996 St Gabriels
- 1997 St Gabriels
- 1998 Brothers Pearse
- 1999 St Gabriels
- 2000 Father Murphys
- 2001 Father Murphys
- 2002 Sean Treacys
- 2003 Father Murphys
- 2004 John Mitchels
- 2005 Thomas McCurtains
- 2006 Erin Go Bragh
- 2007 Brothers Pearse
- 2008 John Mitchels
- 2009 John Mitchels
- 2010 Fullen Gaels
- 2011 Fullen Gaels
- 2012 Fullen Gaels
- 2013 Fullen Gaels
- 2014 Fullen Gaels
- 2015 Fullen Gaels
- 2016 Fullen Gaels
- 2017 Brothers Pearse
- 2018 John Mitchels
- 2019 John Mitchels
- 2020 not played
- 2021 Fullen Gaels
- 2022 Kilburn Gaels
- 2023 Sean Treacys
- 2024 Father Murphys
- 2025 Thomas McCurtains
- 2026 Father Murphys

=== Wins by club ===
Team	County	Wins
St Gabriels	LON	12
Fullen Gaels	LAN	8
John Mitchels	WAR	6
Desmonds	LON	5
Father Murphys	LON	5
Sean Treacys	LON	5
Brian Boru	LON	4
Brothers Pearse	LON	4
St Finbarrs	WAR	2
Thomas McCurtains	LON	2
Cuchulainns, London	LON	1
Erin Go Bragh	WAR	1
Eire Og	HER	1
Kilburn Gaels	LON	1
St Chads	WAR	1

=== Winners by county ===
County	County wins
London	38
Warwickshire	10
Lancashire	8
Hertfordshire	1
Yorkshire	0
Gloucestershire	0
Scotland	0

== List of finals ==
Year	Winner		Score		Runner-up		Venue	Source
Year	County	Club	Score		Club	County	Venue	Source
2026	LON	Father Murphy's	3-16	0-10	John Mitchel's	WAR	McGovern Park, Ruislip	
2025	LON	Thomas McCurtains	6-16	1-7	Ceann Creige	SCO	Páirc na nÉireann, Solihull	
2024	LON	Fr Murphys	3-19	2-10	Fullen Gaels	LAN	Páirc na hÉireann, Solihull	
2023	LON	Sean Treacys	4-21	1-10	St Finbarrs	WAR	McGovern Park, Ruislip	
2022	LON	Kilburn Gaels	4-22	2-7	Fullen Gaels	LAN	Páirc na nÉireann, Solihull	
2021	LAN	Fullen Gaels	1-21	2-12	St Finbarrs	WAR	Páirc na nÉireann, Solihull	
