= 2005 Nicky Rackard Cup final =

Hurling decider

- Event: 2005 Nicky Rackard Cup
London	Louth
5-08	1-05
- Date: 21 August 2005
- Venue: Croke Park, Dublin
- Referee: Tiernach Mahon (Fermanagh)
- Attendance: 39,975

The 2005 Nicky Rackard Cup final was a hurling match played at Croke Park on 21 August 2005 to determine the winners of the 2005 Nicky Rackard Cup, the inaugural season of the Nicky Rackard Cup, a tournament organised by the Gaelic Athletic Association for the third tier hurling teams. The final was contested by London of Britain and Louth of Leinster, with London winning by 5-8 to 1-5.

The Nicky Rackard Cup final between London and Louth was the very first championship meeting between the two teams.

The final was played as a curtain-raiser to the All-Ireland semi-final between Galway and Kilkenny.

While Louth scored the first two points of the game, the first of which came after 13 seconds, London soon recovered and had scored a point from a 65. In the 14th minute, London scored two goals within one minute, to take a 2-2 to 0-2 lead. At half time, London went in at the break leading by 2-4 to 0-5.

In the second half, London scored several goals, with Louth only obtaining one score (a goal) in the half. The final score was London 5-8 to Louth's 1-5.

By winning the Nicky Rackard Cup final, London became the first team to have won the All-Ireland Senior Hurling Championship and Rackard Cup titles. They remain the only winners of both championships.

== Match details ==
21 August 2005
1.30pm

London	5-08 (23) – (8) 1-05	Louth
(HT: 2-04 – 0-05)

GK	1	John Joe Burke (Kilburn Gaels)
RCB	2	Eamon Phelan (Sean Treacys)
FB	3	Tom Simms (Fr Murphy's)
LCB	4	Brian Forde (Kilburn Gaels)
RHB	5	John Dillon (Robert Emmetts)
CHB	6	Fergus McMahon (Robert Emmetts) (c)
LHB	7	Brian Foley (Robert Emmetts)
MF	8	Michael Harding (Fr Murphy's)
MF	9	Mick O'Meara (St Gabriel's)
RHF	10	Daragh Smyth (Fr Murphy's)
CHF	11	Jim Ryan (Cúchulainns)
LHF	12	John McGaughan (Robert Emmetts)
RCF	13	Dave Bourke (Sean Treacys)
FF	14	Barry Shortall (Sean Treacys)
LCF	15	Kevin McMullan (Robert Emmetts)
Substitutes:
	16	Gary Fenton (Robert Emmetts) for O'Meara
	17	Eric Kinlon (Fr Murphy's) for Smyth
	18	Seán Quinn (Robert Emmetts) for Shortall
	19	Paul Doyle (Sean Treacys) for Phelan
	20	Paddy Finneran (St Gabriel's) for McMullan
Manager:
Mick O'Dea

GK	1	Stephen Smyth (Pearse Óg)
RCB	2	David Black (Wolfe Tones)
FB	3	Aidan Carter (Wolfe Tones)
LCB	4	Shane Darcy (Knockbridge)
RHB	5	David Mulholland (Pearse Óg)
CHB	6	Paul Dunne (Knockbridge) (c)
LHB	7	Ronan Byrne (Knockbridge)
MF	8	Diarmuid McCarthy (Wolfe Tones)
MF	9	Shane Callan (Pearse Óg)
RHF	10	Trevor Hilliard (Knockbridge)
CHF	11	Johnny Carter (Wolfe Tones)
LHF	12	Declan Byrne (Naomh Moninne)
RCF	13	Gerard Smyth (Pearse Óg)
FF	14	David Dunne (Knockbridge)
LCF	15	Niall McEneaney (Wolfe Tones)
Substitutes:
	16	Seán Conroy (Pearse Óg) for Black
	17	Ger Collins (Naomh Moninne) for R. Byrne
	18	Seán Byrne (Knockbridge) for J. Carter
	19	Alan Mynes (Wolfe Tones) for McEneaney
	20	Niall Byrne (Knockbridge) for Darcy
Selectors:
Paul Callan, Kevin McDonnell, Séamus Moore
