= Lee Mackey =

Irish hurler

Personal information
- Native name: Laoi Mac Aodha (Irish)
- Born: 1988 (age 37–38) Carrick-on-Suir, County Tipperary, Ireland

Sport
- Sport: Hurling
- Position: Right wing-back
Clubs
- Years: Club
- Carrick Davins; Seán Treacy's
Club titles
- London titles: 0
Inter-county
- Years: County
- 2011 2012-present: Tipperary; London
Inter-county titles
- Leinster titles: 0
- All-Irelands: 0
- NHL: 0
- All Stars: 0

Lee Mackey (born 1988) is an Irish hurler who currently plays as a right wing-back for the London senior hurling team.

== Background ==
Mackey began his inter-county career as a member of the Tipperary minor, under-21, intermediate and senior hurling teams. After emigrating from Ireland he subsequently linked up with the London senior hurling team. As an inter-county hurler he has won one Christy Ring Cup winners' medal.

== Currently ==
At club level Mackey currently plays with the Seán Treacy's club. He previously played with Carrick Davins in Tipperary.
