= Billy Duffy (hurler) =

Irish hurler

Personal information
- Native name: Liam Ó Dufaigh (Irish)
- Born: 1931 Eyrecourt, County Galway, Ireland
- Died: June 2005 (aged 73–74) Shepherd's Bush, London, England
- Occupation: Labourer

Sport
- Sport: Hurling
- Position: Midfield
Clubs
- Years: Club
- Meelick-Eyrecourt; Brothers Pearse
Club titles
- London titles: 4
Inter-county
- Years: County
- 1952-1955: Galway
Inter-county titles
- All-Irelands: 0
- NHL: 0

William Duffy (1931 – June 2005) was an Irish hurler who played as a midfielder for the Galway senior team.

Duffy made his first appearance for the team during the 1952 championship and was a regular member of the starting fifteen until his retirement due to emigration after the 1955 championship. During that time he failed to win any silverware, however, he lined out against Cork in the 1953 All-Ireland final.

At club level, Duffy began his club career with Meelick-Eyrecourt in Galway before later winning four county club championship medals with Brothers Pearse in London.
