= Gene "Bingo" O Driscoll =

Irish Gaelic footballer

Gene O Driscoll
Personal information
- Nickname: Bingo
- Born: Camp, County Kerry
- Height: 6

Sport
- Sport: Gaelic football
- Position: Half forward
Clubs
- Years: Club
- 1986-2008 1990s-2000s: Annascaul; Kerry New York
Club titles
- Kerry titles: 1
Inter-county
Years	County	Apps (scores)
1994-1996 1990s-2000s	Kerry; New York	8(2-10)
Inter-county titles
- Munster titles: 1
- All-Irelands: 0
- All Stars: 0

Gene "Bingo" O Driscoll was a Gaelic footballer who played with Annascaul and the Kerry county team during the late 1980s and 1990s he also played for the New York county team.

== Personal life- ==
O Driscoll's relatives Gene and brother Johnny also played for Kerry.

== Honours ==
Inter-county

- All Ireland U21 Championship 1: 1990
- Munster U21 Championship 1: 1990
- Munster Junior Championship 1991
- All Ireland Junior Championship 1991
- Munster Senior Championship 1: 1996

Club

- Kerry Senior Football Championship 1: 1990
- Kerry Intermediate Football Championship 3: 1987, 1992, 2007
- County League Div 1 1: 1991
- Munster Intermediate Club Football Championship 1: 2007
- West Kerry Senior Championship 4: 1988, 1989, 1990, 1992
- New York Senior Football Championship 5: 1999, 2004, 2005, 2006, 2008
