= Seán Treacy's GAA =

Seán Treacy's GAA may refer to:

- Seán Treacy's GAA (Tipperary), a sports club in the Slieve Felim Hills of Ireland
- Seán Treacy's HC (Lurgan), a hurling club
- Seán Treacy's HC (London), a hurling club in England
