= Gene O Driscoll =

Irish Gaelic footballer

Personal information
- Born: Camp, County Kerry

Sport
- Sport: Gaelic football
- Position: Half forward
Clubs
- Years: Club
- 1960's-1980's: Annascaul; St Mary's London; Geraldine's
Club titles
- London titles: 1
Inter-county
Years	County	Apps (scores)
1962	Kerry Galway London New York	1 (1-01)
Inter-county titles
- Munster titles: 1
- All-Irelands: 0
- All Stars: 0

Gene O Driscoll was a Gaelic footballer who played with Kerry, Galway, London and New York during the 1960s and 1970s.

He was on the first ever Kerry Under 21 team which contested and won the Munster Championship in Kenmare in 1962. He also played with the Kerry senior team that year and won a Munster Championship at centre forward scoring 1-01 in what was his only championship game at senior level with Kerry, he emigrated following this game. After a number of years in London in 1969 he won an All Ireland Junior Championship when London beat Wicklow. He was soon on the move once more this time to New York City, where he also played with the New York county team, with whom he played in the 1966 National League final.

At club level he first played with Annascaul and West Kerry. When he first moved to London he played with the St Mary's club before joining Geraldine's where he won a Junior Championship. he then rejoined St Mary's and won a Senior Championship in 1963.

In 2011 he was picked on the All Star London team 1960–2010.

His sons Bingo and Johnny both also played with Kerry and New York during the 1990s and 2000s.
