= Robert Emmetts GAA =

Robert Emmetts
- Roibéard Eiméad
- Founded: 1948
- County: London
- Colours: Blue and yellow
- Grounds: Greenford

Playing kits
Standard colours

Robert Emmetts GAA is a Gaelic Athletic Association club located in South West London, England. The club is primarily concerned with the game of hurling.

== History ==
Robert Emmetts hurling club was founded in Bow Palais on 20 March 1948, with a Gaelic football club initiated less than six months later. The club's first game was against Thomas McCurtains and they competed in the London IHC for much of their existence. Robert Emmetts made their big breakthrough in 2004 when they defeated Fr. Murphy's to win the London SHC title. It was the first of the club's nine senior titles. Robert Emmetts defeated Killimordaly to become the first overseas winners of the All-Ireland Club IHC title in 2007.

The club is named for Irish republican and rebel Robert Emmet (1778–1803), but consistently misspells his name with two T's.

== Honours ==
- London Senior Hurling Championship (9): 2004, 2006, 2007, 2008, 2011, 2015, 2016, 2019, 2021
- All-Ireland Intermediate Club Hurling Championship (1): 2007

== Notable players ==
- Ronan Crowley: All-Ireland IHC-winner (2014)
