= James Hanley (hurler) =

Irish hurler

James "Seán Óg" Hanley
Personal information
- Native name: Séamus Ó hÁinle (Irish)
- Born: 1877 Kilfinane, County Limerick, Ireland
- Died: August 1915 (aged 38) London, England
- Occupation: Labourer
- Height: 6 ft 1 in (185 cm)

Sport
- Sport: Hurling
- Position: Full-back
Clubs
- Years: Club
- Kilfinane; Robert Emmett's
Club titles
- Limerick titles: 1
Inter-county
- Years: County
- 1896-1899 1900-1903: Limerick; London Irish
Inter-county titles
- Munster titles: 1
- All-Irelands: 1

James "Seán Óg" Hanley (1877 – August 1915) was an Irish hurler who played as a full-back for the Limerick and London Irish senior teams.

Hanley made his first appearance on the inter-county scene for the Limerick team during the 1896 championship and later played with London Irish until the end of the 1903 championship. During that time he won one All-Ireland medal and one Munster medal.

At club level Hanley was a one-time county club championship medalist with Kilfinane. He also lined out with the Robert Emmett's club in London.
