= Killian Burke =

Irish hurler

Personal information
- Native name: Cillian de Búrca (Irish)
- Born: 9 January 1993 (age 33) Midleton, County Cork, Ireland
- Occupation: Business analyst
- Height: 6 ft 1 in (185 cm)

Sport
- Sport: Hurling
- Position: Centre-back
Clubs
- Years: Club
- Midleton; Robert Emmets
Club titles
- Cork titles: 1
Inter-county*
| Years | County | Apps (scores) |
| 2014-2017 2018- | Cork; London | 2 (0-00) |
Inter-county titles
- Munster titles: 2
- All-Irelands: 0
- NHL: 0
- All Stars: 0
- *Inter County team apps and scores correct as of 23:02, 27 February 2019.

Killian Burke (born 9 January 1993) is an Irish hurler who currently plays as a centre-back for the London senior team.

Born in Midleton, County Cork, Burke first played competitive hurling during his schooling at Midleton CBS Secondary School. He arrived on the inter-county scene at the age of seventeen when he first linked up with the Cork minor team, before later joining the under-21 side. He made his senior debut in the 2014 National Hurling League. Burke has since gone on to join Cork's championship panel.

At club level Burke is a one-time championship medallist with Midleton.

== Career statistics ==
As of match played 25 February 2018.

| Team | Year | National League | | | Christy Ring Cup | | Munster | | All-Ireland | | Total | |
| Team | Year | Division | Apps | Score | Apps | Score | Apps | Score | Apps | Score | Apps | Score |
|---|---|---|---|---|---|---|---|---|---|---|---|---|
| Cork | 2014 | Division 1B | 1 | 0-01 | 0 | 0-00 | 0 | 0-00 | 0 | 0-00 | 1 | 0-01 |
| Cork | 2015 | Division 1A | 1 | 0-00 | 0 | 0-00 | 0 | 0-00 | 0 | 0-00 | 1 | 0-00 |
| Cork | 2016 | Division 1A | 4 | 0-00 | 0 | 0-00 | 1 | 0-00 | 1 | 0-00 | 6 | 0-00 |
| Cork | 2017 | Division 1A | 4 | 0-00 | 0 | 0-00 | 0 | 0-00 | 0 | 0-00 | 4 | 0-00 |
| London | 2018 | Division 1B | 1 | 0-01 | 0 | 0-00 | 0 | 0-00 | 0 | 0-00 | 1 | 0-01 |
| Total | | | 11 | 0-02 | 0 | 0-00 | 1 | 0-00 | 1 | 0-00 | 13 | 0-02 |

== Honours ==
University College Cork

- All-Ireland Freshers' Hurling Championship (1): 2012

Midleton

- Cork Senior Hurling Championship (1): 2013

Cork

- Munster Senior Hurling Championship (1): 2014 (sub)

Sporting positions
| Preceded by Christopher Joyce | Cork Under-21 Hurling Captain; 2014 | Succeeded by Conor Twomey |
