= 2014–15 All-Ireland Junior Club Football Championship =

- Sponsor: Allied Irish Bank
- Champions: Brosna (1st title); Don McAuliffe (captain); Jimmy Keane (manager)
- Runners-up: John Mitchels; Patrick Mulligan (captain); Barry Morris (manager)

The 2014–15 All-Ireland Junior Club Football Championship was the 14th staging of the All-Ireland Junior Club Football Championship since its establishment by the Gaelic Athletic Association in 2002.

The All-Ireland final was played on 14 February 2015 at Croke Park in Dublin, between Brosna and John Mitchels. Brosna won the match by 0–08 to 0–05 to claim their first ever championship title.

== All-Ireland Junior Club Football Championship ==
=== All-Ireland final ===
14 February 2015 Final	Brosna	0-08 - 0-05	John Mitchels	Croke Park
