= Warwickshire Senior Hurling Championship =

Hurling tournament in Warwickshire, England

- Irish: Craobh Sinsir Iomáint Warwickshire
- Code: Hurling
- Founded: 1938
- Region: Warwickshire (GAA)
- No. of teams: 4
- Title holders: John Mitchel's (33rd title)
- Most titles: John Mitchel's (33 titles)

The Warwickshire Senior Hurling Championship is the top-level hurling championship in Warwickshire, England, and is the responsibility of the Warwickshire county board. As of 2026, four teams compete in the county championship.

== Teams ==
Club name		Location
English	Irish	Location
Erin go Bragh	Erin go Bragh	Birmingham
John Mitchels	Séan Mistéal	Birmingham
St Barnabas	Barnaib Naofa	Nottingham
St Finbarrs	Naomh Fionnbarra	Coventry

== Roll of honour ==
- 1938 Éire Óg
- 1939 Éire Óg
- 1940
- 1941 Granuaile
- 1942 Granuaile
- 1943 Granuaile
- 1944 Granuaile
- 1945
- 1946
- 1947 Erin's Hope
- 1948
- 1949
- 1950 John Mitchel's
- 1951 Emerald Isle
- 1952 Shannon Rangers
- 1953 John Mitchel's
- 1954 Emerald Isle
- 1955 St. Finbarr's
- 1956 St. Finbarr's
- 1957 St. Finbarr's
- 1958 Croke's
- 1959 Croke's
- 1960 St. Chad's
- 1961 St. Finbarr's
- 1962 Fr. Murphy's
- 1963 St. Chad's
- 1964 St. Finbarr's
- 1965 St. Finbarr's
- 1966 St. Finbarr's
- 1967 St. Finbarr's
- 1968 St. Chad's
- 1969 St. Finbarr's
- 1970 John Mitchel's
- 1971 Sean McDermott's
- 1972 Sean McDermott's
- 1973 St. Finbarr's
- 1974 John Mitchel's
- 1975 John Mitchel's
- 1976 Sean McDermott's
- 1977 Sean McDermott's
- 1978 Sean McDermott's
- 1979 Sean McDermott's
- 1980 St. Finbarr's
- 1981 Sean McDermott's
- 1982 Sean McDermott's
- 1983 Sean McDermott's
- 1984 Sean McDermott's
- 1985 Sean McDermott's
- 1986 Sean McDermott's
- 1987 Sean McDermott's
- 1988 St. Finbarr's
- 1989 Sean McDermott's
- 1990 Sean McDermott's
- 1991 John Mitchel's
- 1992 John Mitchel's
- 1993 John Mitchel's
- 1994 Sean McDermott's
- 1995 Sean McDermott's
- 1996 Sean McDermott's
- 1997 Sean McDermott's
- 1998 Sean McDermott's
- 1999 John Mitchel's
- 2000 John Mitchel's
- 2001 John Mitchel's
- 2002 John Mitchel's
- 2003 John Mitchel's
- 2004 John Mitchel's
- 2005 John Mitchel's
- 2006 Erin go Bragh
- 2007 John Mitchel's
- 2008 John Mitchel's
- 2009 John Mitchel's
- 2010 Fullen Gaels
- 2011 Fullen Gaels
- 2012 Fullen Gaels
- 2013 Fullen Gaels
- 2014 John Mitchel's
- 2015 John Mitchel's
- 2016 John Mitchel's
- 2017 John Mitchel's
- 2018 John Mitchel's
- 2019 John Mitchel's
- 2020 John Mitchel's
- 2021 St. Finbarr's
- 2022 John Mitchel's
- 2023 St. Finbarr's
- 2024 St. Finbarr's
- 2025 John Mitchel's
- 2026 John Mitchel's

Club	SHC wins
John Mitchel's	33
Sean McDermott's	22
St. Finbarr's	15
Granuaile	4
Fullen Gaels†	4
St. Chad's	3
Croke's	2
Emerald Isle	2
Éire Óg	2
Erin go Bragh	1
Fr. Murphys	1
Shannon Rangers	1

†Fullen Gaels competed in the Warwickshire Senior Hurling competition until 2014, due to lack of opponents in Lancashire.
