= 2008–09 All-Ireland Junior Club Football Championship =

- Sponsor: Allied Irish Bank
- Champions: Skellig Rangers (1st title)
- Runners-up: John Mitchels

The 2008–09 All-Ireland Junior Club Football Championship was the eighth staging of the All-Ireland Junior Club Football Championship since its establishment by the Gaelic Athletic Association.

The All-Ireland final was played on 14 February 2009 at Croke Park in Dublin, between Skellig Rangers and John Mitchels. Skellig Rangers won the match by 0–10 to 0–09 to claim their first ever championship title.

== All-Ireland Junior Club Football Championship ==
=== All-Ireland final ===
14 February 2009 Final	Skellig Rangers	0-10 - 0-09	John Mitchels	Croke Park
