= 1985–86 All-Ireland Senior Club Football Championship =

Irish Football Championship

- Teams: 33
- Champions: Burren (1st title)
- Runners-up: Castleisland Desmonds

The 1985–86 All-Ireland Senior Club Football Championship was the 16th staging of the All-Ireland Senior Club Football Championship since its establishment by the Gaelic Athletic Association in 1970-71.

Castleisland Desmonds entered the championship as the defending champions.

On 16 March 1986, Burren won the championship following a 1–10 to 1–6 defeat of Castleisland Desmonds in the All-Ireland final at Croke Park. It was their first ever championship title.

== Munster ==
=== First round ===
3 November 1985 First round	St Kieran's	0-08 - 1-08	St Joseph's, Milltown Malbay	Páirc na nGael
	P O'Connor 0-2, J Enright 0-2, P Leahy 0-2, M Molyneaux 0-1, D Nolan 0-1.		M Flanagan 1-3, S Bourke 0-1, J Jones 0-1, N Curtin 0-1, G Curtin 0-1, S Cleary 0-1.

23 November 1985 First round	St Finbarr's	2-11 - 0-03	Arravale Rovers	Páirc Uí Chaoimh
	T Leahy 1-3, C Ryan 1-1, D Barry 0-3, B Searles 0-2, J Barry-Murphy 0-1, T Power 0-1.		B Walsh 0-1, J Lowry 0-1, W Crowe 0-1.

=== Semi-finals ===
8 December 1985 Semi-final	St Finbarr's	1-16 - 0-06	Kilrossanty	Kilbarry Sportsfield
	D Barry 0-7, D O'Mahony 1-0, C Ryan 0-2, M Slocum 0-1, R Kenny 0-1, M Healy 0-1, B Searles 0-1, J Barry-Murphy 0-1, T Power 0-1, T Leahy 0-1.		T Behan 0-2, N Hayes 0-1, P Hayes 0-1, T Keating 0-1, J Mulkern 0-1.

8 December 1985 Semi-final	St Joseph's, Milltown Malbay	0-04 - 2-08	Castleisland Desmonds	Cusack Park
	S Burke 0-3, M Killeen 0-1.		P Horan 1-2, J Lordan 1-0, C Kearney 0-3, D Lyne 0-3.

=== Final ===
22 December 1985 Final	Castleisland Desmonds	1-11 - 0-05	St Finbarr's	Bruff Sportsfield
	C Kearney 0-5, J Lordan 1-1, P Horan 0-3, M Downey 0-1, D Lyne 0-1.		M Slocum 0-2, D Barry 0-2, C Ryan 0-1.

== Quarter-final ==
9 February 1986 Quarter-final	Castleisland Desmonds	5-12 - 2-04	Kingdom	Castleisland Desmonds Park

== Semi-finals ==
23 February 1986 Semi-final	Portlaoise	0-06 - 2-13	Burren	O'Moore Park

23 February 1986 Semi-final	Clann na nGael	1-08 - 0-11	Castleisland Desmonds	Páirc Naomh Bríd

1 March 1986 Semi-final	Castleisland Desmonds	2-09 - 1-06	Clann na nGael	Castleisland Desmonds Park

== Final ==
16 March 1986 Final	Burren	1-10 - 1-06	Castleisland Desmonds	Croke Park

== Statistics ==
=== Miscellaneous ===
- Portlaoise became the first team to win four Leinster Club Championship titles.
