= 2010–11 All-Ireland Junior Club Football Championship =

- Sponsor: Allied Irish Bank
- Champions: St Mary's (1st title)
- Runners-up: Swanlinbar

The 2010–11 All-Ireland Junior Club Football Championship was the tenth staging of the All-Ireland Junior Club Football Championship since its establishment by the Gaelic Athletic Association.

The All-Ireland final was played on 12 February 2011 at Croke Park in Dublin, between St Mary's and Swanlinbar. St Mary's won the match by 3-13 to 1-05 to claim their first ever championship title.

== All-Ireland Junior Club Football Championship ==
=== All-Ireland final ===
12 February 2011 Final	St Mary's	1-14 - 0-15	Swanlinbar	Croke Park
