= London Intermediate Hurling Championship =

The London Intermediate Hurling Championship is a Gaelic Athletic Association cup competition between the second tier hurling clubs in London, England, organised by London GAA. In addition to four intermediate clubs, senior clubs regularly submit 'B' teams into the competition. The competition's winner is promoted to the senior championship for the following year.

== Teams ==
=== 2026 teams ===
Club	Location
Cú Chulainns	Kidbrooke
Fr. Murphy's	Old Deer Park, Richmond
Fulham Irish	Wormwood Scrubs
Granuaile	Harrow, London
Kilburn Gaels	Kilburn
St Gabriel's	Wembley

== List of finals ==
Year	Winner	Score	Score	Opponents
2026	Fr Murphy's	1-15	1-13	Fulham Irish
2025	Thomas McCurtain	3-20	0-04	Fulham Irish
2024	Fr. Murphy's	2-14	1-12	Fulham Irish
2023	Sean Tracey’s	2-16	3-07	Granuaile
2022	Kilburn Gaels			
2021	Granuaile			
2020	Sean Tracey’s			
2019	Fr. Murphy's	3-17	1-11	Fulham Irish
2018	Thomas McCurtain	4-12	1-13	Fr. Murphy's
2017	Brothers Pearse	3-21	0-11	Thomas McCurtain
2016	Fr. Murphy's	1-14	2-10	Brothers Pearse
2015	St Gabriel's B	1-09	0-07	Fulham Irish
2014	Cú Chulainns	0-16	1-08	Thomas McCurtain
2013	St Gabriel's B	scr.	w/o	N/A
2012	Fulham Irish	2-07	2-06	Granuaile
2011	Michael Cusack's	0-18	1-13	Fulham Irish
2010	Brothers Pearse	3-08	2-08	Michael Cusack's
2009	Granuaile			
2007 -2008	No Championsip			
2006	Granuaile			
1997-2005	No Championsip			
1996	Fr. Murphy's			
1995	Glen Rovers			
1994	Desmonds			
1993	No Championship			
1992	Sean Tracey’s			
1991	St Gabriel's			
1990	St Gabriel's			
1989	No Championship			
1988	Desmonds			
1987	No Championship			
1986	St Gabriel's			
1985	St Gabriel's			
1984	Clann na nGael			
1983	Cú Chulainns			
1982	Fr. Murphy's			
1981	Naomh Mhuire			
1980	Sean Tracey’s			
1979	Robert Emmetts			
1978	St Gabriel's			
1977	Fr. Murphy's			
1976	Cú Chulainns			
1975	Thomas McCurtain			
1974	Cú Chulainns			
1973	St Gabriel's			
1972	Moindearg			
1971	Naomh Mhuire			
1970	Sean Tracey’s			
1969	Kingdom			
1968	St Gabriel's			
1967	Padraig Meachairs			
1966	Thomas McCurtain			
1965	Kingdom			
1964	Naomh Mhuire			
1963	St Gabriel's			
1962	Sean Tracey’s			
1961	Tara			
1960	Fr. Murphy's			
1959	Emeralds			
1958	St Martins			
1957	Sean McDermotts			
1956	Sarsfields			

== Roll of Honour ==
Team	Number of titles	Year
St Gabriel's	10	2015, 2013, 1991, 1990, 1986, 1985, 1978, 1973, 1968, 1963
Fr. Murphy's	8	2026, 2024, 2019, 2016, 1996, 1982, 1977, 1960
Sean Tracey’s	6	2023, 2020, 1992, 1980, 1970, 1962
Thomas McCurtain	4	2025, 2018, 1975, 1966
Cú Chulainns	4	2014, 1983, 1976, 1974
Granuaile	3	2021, 2009, 2006
Naomh Mhuire	3	1981, 1971, 1964
Brothers Pearse	2	2017, 2010
Desmonds	2	1994, 1988
Kingdom	2	1969, 1965
Kilburn Gaels	1	2022
Fulham Irish	1	2012
Michael Cusack's	1	2011
Glen Rovers	1	1995
Clann na nGael	1	1984
Robert Emmetts	1	1979
Moindearg	1	1972
Padraig Meachairs	1	1967
Tara	1	1961
Emeralds	1	1959
St Martins	1	1958
Sean McDermotts	1	1957
Sarsfields	1	1956

== See also ==
- London Senior Hurling Championship
- London Intermediate Football Championship
