= Brothers Pearse GAA =

GAA club in London, England

Brothers Pearse
- Na Deartháireacha Piarsach
- Founded: 1920
- County: London
- Colours
- Grounds: Willesden Sports Centre
- Coordinates: 51°32′N 0°14′W

Playing kits
Standard colours

Senior Club Championships
	All Ireland	Connacht champions	London champions
Football:	0	0	3
Hurling:	0	0	13

Brothers Pearse London Hurling and Football Club is a Gaelic Athletic Association club located in Willesden, North West London, England. The club is affiliated to the London County Board and fields teams in both hurling and Gaelic football.

== History ==
Brothers Pearse play on the fields at Willesden Sports Centre

Located in Willesden in North West London, Brothers Pearse London Hurling and Football Club was founded in 1920 and is the oldest GAA club still operating in London. The club is named in honour of the Pearse brothers - Patrick and Willie - who were both executed for their role in the 1916 Easter Rising.

Brothers Pearse were just a year old when they had their first success by winning the London SFC title in 1921. The club claimed further such titles in 1927 and 1938. In spite of these early successes, Brothers Pearse subsequently became one of the dominant hurling clubs in London, having won its first London SHC title in 1924. The club won London SHC titles in every decade except the 1980s, including three successive titles between 1957 and 1959.

The 21st century saw Brothers Pearse face relegation from the London SHC, however, the club returned to the top flight after winning London IHC titles in 2010 and 2017. Brothers Pearse's centenary year saw the club win the London SHC title following a 1–17 to 0–18 defeat of St Gabriel's in the final. The club won further London SHC titles in 2023 and 2026.

== Honours ==
- London Senior Hurling Championship (13): 1924, 1936, 1938, 1947, 1957, 1958, 1959, 1968, 1972, 1998, 2020, 2023, 2026
- London Senior Football Championship (3): 1921, 1927, 1938
- London Intermediate Hurling Championship (2): 2010, 2017

== Notable players ==
- Andy Comerford: All-Ireland SHC-winner (2000, 2002, 2003)
- Martin Comerford: All-Ireland SHC-winner (2002, 2003, 2006, 2007, 2008, 2009)
