= Johnny O Driscoll =

Irish Gaelic footballer

Johnny O'Driscoll
Personal information
- Nickname: Puppy
- Born: Camp, County Kerry

Sport
- Sport: Gaelic football
- Position: Back
Clubs
- Years: Club
- 1980's-2010's 1990s-2000's: Annascaul; Kerry New York
Inter-county
Years	County	Apps (scores)
1996 1990'-2000's	Kerry New York	2
Inter-county titles
- Munster titles: 1
- All-Irelands: 0
- All Stars: 0

Johnny O Driscoll is a footballer from Camp, County Kerry. He played with the Kerry intercounty team during the 1990s. He also played with the New York team in the 2000s.

== Club ==
He played his club football with Annascaul, helping them to the 1993 County Final where they lost out to Laune Rangers. He won Intermediate titles in 1992 and 2007 and a Junior title in 2003. He also won a Minor title with West Kerry in 1990. He won a New York Senior Football Championship in 1999.

== Minor ==
O'Driscoll first played with Kerry at minor level in the 1990 All-Ireland Minor Football Championship. Wins over Tipperary, Clare and Cork seen him win a Munster Minor Football Championship. Kerry needed a replay to over come Galway in the All-Ireland semi-final. In the final Kerry faced Meath in Croke Park. In a close game the title went to Meath on a 2–11 to 2–09 scoreline.
