= Seán Treacy's HC (London) =

Seán Treacy's
- Seán Ó Treasaigh
- Founded: 1958
- County: London
- Colours: Red and white
- Grounds: Mitcham Rugby Grounds, London

Playing kits
Standard colours

Seán Treacy's Hurling Club is a Gaelic Athletic Association club located in London, England. The club was founded in 1958 and is exclusively concerned with the game of hurling.

== History ==
The Sean Treacy's club was founded in 1958 at 18 Marius Road, Tooting Bec, South London, and was named after Irish War of Independence fighter Seán Treacy (1895–1920). Its founding members were Mick Maunsell, Martin McGrath, Pakie Hourigan, Paddy Quinlan (all Limerick), Johnny Connolly (Galway) and Paddy Crowe (Tipperary). The team trained in Tooting Bec Common and reached the final in their first year. They were narrowly defeated by a single point by Brothers Pearse.

== Honours ==
- London Senior Hurling Championship (5): 1984, 1991, 1993, 1994, 2002
- London Intermediate Hurling Championship (2): 2020, 2023
- All Britain Hurling Championship (1): 2023
