= Thomas McCurtains GAA =

Gaelic Athletic Association club

- Tomás Mac Curtain CLG
- Founded: 1920
- County: London
- Colours: Maroon and White
- Grounds: Medici Close, Ilford IG3 8FE, UK

Playing kits
Standard colours

Thomas McCurtains is a Gaelic Athletic Association club based in Goodmayes, East London, with adult teams also training in Hackney Marshes and Stratford (London Stadium). The club covers a wide area and current players live in many different areas, including, London and Essex. The club was founded in 1920, making it one of London's oldest GAA clubs. The club offers hurling, camogie, gaelic football, ladies' football and GAA handball from under-8s up to adults.

== History ==
The club was founded in 1920 from members of the Forest Gate Branch of the Gaelic League. It soon adopted the name of Tomás Mac Curtain (1884–1920), in honour of the late Lord Mayor of Cork whom members of the Royal Irish Constabulary (RIC) shot dead during the Irish War of Independence, but the club was often referred to as Forest Gate in the early days. McCurtains' first fixtures came in 1921 when the club entered the first London GAA league and championship competitions to be played after the First World War in both hurling and football, with games being played in Manor Park Athletic Grounds. It is thought that the players trained on Wanstead Flats, though this is unconfirmed.

The club moved to The Leys, Ballards Road, Dagenham, at the bequest of Ford's Dagenham, some time during the 1930s. In 1934 the club won its first Senior Football Championship and retained its title the following year (1935). The club disbanded at the start of the Second World War and did not reform until 1948. It was at this time that the club was known as Hibernians, after a dance hall which members attended and a potential sponsor. In the early 1950s (possibly 1952), the club reverted to using the name Thomas McCurtains. In 1955 the newly crowned All-Ireland Senior Hurling Championship winner, Cork (featuring Christy Ring), travelled to Dagenham and played a "Dagenham Select" team, which consisted heavily of McCurtains players.

The club won multiple championships at junior and intermediate grades in both codes over the decades, before winning the Senior Hurling Championship in 1987. With the upturn of economic fortunes in Ireland and the emergence of the Celtic Tiger economy, the GAA in London struggled as many Gaels returned home. Thus the club struggled on the pitch during the 1990s.

Around the turn of the century, the club relocated once more to Goodmayes Hospital Sports Grounds, where it currently resides. This brought with it success in the 2000s, with the club winning more championships, including the All-Britain Junior Hurling Championship in 2005. More recently, a Ladies Football Club was founded in 2011, while a Camogie Club followed in 2016.

== Honours ==
Hurling

- London Senior Hurling Championship (1): 1987
- London Intermediate Hurling Championship (7): 1966, 1975, 2001, 2005, 2008, 2018, 2025
- London Junior Hurling Championship (3): 1950 (as Hibernians), 1965, 1971
- All Britain Club Junior Hurling Championship (2): 2005, 2025

Gaelic Football

- London Senior Football Championship (2): 1934, 1935
- London Intermediate Football Championship (3): 1984, 2007, 2019
- London Junior Football Championship (3): 1966, 1980, 2017
- All Britain Club Junior Football Championship (1): 2019

Ladies Gaelic Football

- London Junior Ladies Football Championship (6): 2012, 2014, 2015, 2020, 2023, 2026

Camogie

- All Britain Intermediate Camogie Championship (1): 2020
- All Britain Junior Camogie Championship (2): 2016, 2022

Handball

- Connacht Senior One Wall Championship (1): Colm Grace - 2022
