= London Senior Hurling Championship =

- Current season or competition: 2026 London Senior Hurling Championship
- Irish: Craobh Shinsir Iomána Londain
- Code: Hurling
- Founded: 1897
- Region: London (GAA)
- No. of teams: 6
- Title holders: Brothers Pearse (13th title)
- Most titles: Brian Borus (26 titles)
- Sponsors: Capital Concrete

The London Senior Hurling Championship is a Gaelic Athletic Association cup competition between the top hurling clubs in London, England.

== Format ==
=== Group stage ===
Six clubs start in the group stage. Over the course of the group stage, each team plays once against the others in the group, resulting in each team being guaranteed five group games. Two points are awarded for a win, one for a draw and zero for a loss. The teams are ranked in the group stage table by points gained, then scoring difference and then their head-to-head record. The top four teams qualify for the knockout stage

=== Knockout stage ===
Semi-finals: The top four teams from the group stage contest this round. The two winners from these two games advance to the final.

Final: The two semi-final winners contest the final. The winning team are declared champions.

=== Relegation ===
The sixth-placed team from the group stage are relegated to the London Intermediate Hurling Championship.

== Teams ==
=== 2026 teams ===
Club	Location	Colours	Championship titles	Last championship title
Brothers Pearse	Willesden	Green and yellow	13	2026
Sean Tracey’s	Tooting	Red and white	5	2002
Kilburn Gaels	Kilburn	Green and white	3	2017
Robert Emmetts	East London	Blue and yellow	14	2021
St Gabriel's	Wembley	Blue and gold	20	2025
Thomas McCurtains	Goodmayes	Maroon and white	1	1987

=== 2026 grades ===
Grade	Club
Senior
Senior	Brothers Pearse
Senior	Kilburn Gaels
Senior	Robert Emmetts
Senior	Sean Tracey’s
Senior	St Gabriel's
Senior	Thomas McCurtains
Intermediate
Intermediate	Cú Chulainns
Intermediate	Fr. Murphy's
Intermediate	Fulham Irish
Intermediate	Granuaile
Intermediate	Kilburn Gaels (2nd team)
Intermediate	St Gabriel's (2nd team)

== Qualification for subsequent competitions ==
At the end of the championship, the winning team qualify to the subsequent Connacht Intermediate Club Hurling Championship, the winner of which progresses to the All-Ireland Intermediate Club Hurling Championship.

== Roll of honour ==
=== By club ===
#	Club	Titles	Runners-up	Championship wins	Championship runner-up
1	Brian Borus	26	1	1903, 1909, 1926, 1929, 1932, 1939, 1941, 1942, 1943, 1944, 1945, 1946, 1948, 1955, 1960, 1962, 1963, 1964, 1966, 1969, 1970, 1971, 1975, 1979, 1980, 1982	1987
2	St Gabriel's	20	16	1965, 1973, 1974, 1976, 1977, 1978, 1981, 1986, 1990, 1995, 1996, 1997, 1999, 2009, 2012, 2013, 2018, 2022, 2024, 2025	1969, 1970, 1971, 1972, 1975, 1979, 1988, 1991, 2003, 2007, 2011, 2015, 2016, 2019, 2020, 2021
3	Brothers Pearse	13	5	1924, 1936, 1938, 1947, 1957, 1958, 1959, 1968, 1972, 1998, 2020, 2023, 2026	1982, 1985, 1995, 1997, 2013
4	Robert Emmetts	8	9	2006, 2007, 2008, 2011, 2015, 2016, 2019, 2021	1996, 2002, 2005, 2009, 2017, 2018, 2022, 2023, 2024
5	Sean Treacy's	5	10	1984, 1991, 1993, 1994, 2002	1959, 1989, 1992, 1998, 2000, 2001, 2008, 2010, 2014, 2026
5	Desmonds	5	2	1983, 1985, 1988, 1989, 1992	1984, 1986
5	Fintan Lalors	5	0	1922, 1923, 1927, 1928, 1930	—
8	Fr. Murphy's	4	2	2000, 2001, 2003, 2005	1999, 2004
8	Geraldines	4	0	1912, 1913, 1914, 1915	—
8	Cuchullians	4	0	1951, 1952, 1954, 1967	—
11	Kilburn Gaels	3	3	2010, 2014, 2017	2006, 2012, 2025
11	Tara	3	0	1933, 1934, 1937	—
11	Naomh Mhuire	3	0	1949, 1950, 1953	—
14	Hibernians	2	1	1904, 1907	1952
15	Thomas McCurtains	1	5	1987	1933, 1976, 1978, 1980, 1993
15	Ireland United	1	0	1897	—
15	Desmond Rovers	1	0	1900	—
15	Rooneys	1	0	1908	—
15	Cusacks	1	0	1910	—
15	Eire Og	1	0	1921	—
15	Erin's Hope	1	0	1940	—
15	Young Irelands	1	0	1956	—
15	Sean McDermotts	1	0	1961	—

== List of finals ==
=== Legend ===
- Gold – All-Ireland intermediate club champions
- Silver – All-Ireland intermediate club runners-up
- (R) — replay

=== List of London SHC finals ===
Year	Winners		Runners-up	
Year	Club	Score	Club	Score
2026	Brothers Pearse	1-17	Sean Treacy's	1-16
2025	St Gabriel's	2-15	Kilburn Gaels	1-13
2024	St Gabriel's	5-21	Robert Emmetts	0-13
2023	Brothers Pearse	0-17	Robert Emmetts	0-13
2022	St Gabriel's	4-15	Robert Emmetts	3-12
2021	Robert Emmetts	2-21	St Gabriel's	1-18
2020	Brothers Pearse	1-17	St Gabriel's	0-18
2019	Robert Emmetts	1-25	St Gabriel's	3-17
2018	St Gabriel's	2-17	Robert Emmetts	2-11
2017	Kilburn Gaels	1-16	Robert Emmetts	0-14
2016	Robert Emmetts	2-13	St Gabriel's	1-12
2015	Robert Emmetts	3-10	St Gabriel's	1-10
2014	Kilburn Gaels	4-20	Sean Treacy's	0-08
2013	St Gabriel's	3-16	Brothers Pearse	2-05
2012	St Gabriel's	1-14	Kilburn Gaels	2-08
2011	Robert Emmetts	2-14	St Gabriel's	1-11
2010	Kilburn Gaels	3-11	Sean Treacy's	0-07
2009	St Gabriel's	3-06	Robert Emmets	1-08
2008	Robert Emmetts	3-13	Sean Treacy's	0-07
2007	Robert Emmetts		St Gabriel's	
2006	Robert Emmetts	2-15	Kilburn Gaels	1-04
2005	Fr. Murphy's	2-11	Robert Emmetts	0-13
2004	Robert Emmetts		Fr. Murphy's	
2003	Fr. Murphy's	3-09	St Gabriel's	0-06
2002	Sean Treacy's	1-11	Robert Emmetts	0-05
2001	Fr. Murphy's		Sean Treacy's	
2000	Fr. Murphy's		Sean Treacy's	
1999	St Gabriel's		Fr. Murphy's	
1998	Brothers Pearse		Sean Treacy's	
1997	St Gabriel's		Brothers Pearse	
1996	St Gabriel's		Robert Emmetts	
1995	St Gabriel's		Brothers Pearse	
1994	Sean Treacy's			
1993	Sean Treacy's		Thomas McCurtains	
1992	Desmonds		Sean Treacy's	
1991	Sean Treacy's		St Gabriel's	
1990	St Gabriel's			
1989	Desmonds		Sean Treacy's	
1988	Desmonds		St Gabriel's	
1987	Thomas McCurtains		Brian Borus	
1986	St Gabriel's		Desmonds	
1985	Desmonds		Brothers Pearse	
1984	Sean Treacy's		Desmonds	
1983	Desmonds		Sean McDermotts	
1982	Brian Borus		Brothers Pearse	
1981	St Gabriel's			
1980	Brian Borus		Thomas McCurtains	
1979	Brian Borus		St Gabriel's	
1978	St Gabriel's	2-11	Thomas McCurtains	0-11
1977	St Gabriel's			
1976	St Gabriel's	5-11	Thomas McCurtains	3-10
1975	Brian Borus		St Gabriel's	
1974	St Gabriel's			
1973	St Gabriel's			
1972	Brothers Pearse		St Gabriel's	
1971	Brian Borus		St Gabriel's	
1970	Brian Borus		St Gabriel's	
1969	Brian Borus		St Gabriel's	
1968	Brothers Pearse			
1967	Cuchullians			
1966	Brian Borus			
1965	St Gabriel's			
1964	Brian Borus			
1963	Brian Borus			
1962	Brian Borus			
1961	Sean McDermotts			
1960	Brian Borus			
1959	Brothers Pearse		Sean Treacy's	
1958	Brothers Pearse			
1957	Brothers Pearse			
1956	Young Irelands			
1955	Brian Borus			
1954	Cuchullians			
1953	Naomh Mhuire			
1952	Cuchullians	5-06	Hibernians	2-03
1951	Cuchullians			
1950	Naomh Mhuire			
1949	Naomh Mhuire			
1948	Brian Borus			
1947	Brothers Pearse			
1946	Brian Borus			
1945	Brian Borus			
1944	Brian Borus			
1943	Brian Borus			
1942	Brian Borus			
1941	Brian Borus			
1940	Erin's Hope			
1939	Brian Borus			
1938	Brothers Pearse			
1937	Tara			
1936	Brothers Pearse			
1935	Cuchullians			
1934	Tara			
1933	Tara	6-02	Thomas McCurtains	3-00
1932	Brian Borus			
1931				
1930	Fintan Lalors			
1929	Brian Borus			
1928	Fintan Lalors			
1927	Fintan Lalors			
1926	Brian Borus			
1925				
1924	Brothers Pearse			
1923	Fintan Lalors			
1922	Fintan Lalors			
1921	Éire Óg			
1916–1920	No Championship			
1915	Geraldines			
1914	Geraldines			
1913	Geraldines			
1912	Geraldines			
1911	No Championship			
1910	Cusacks			
1909	Brian Borus			
1908	Rooneys			
1907	Hibernians			
1906	Robert Emmetts			
1905	Robert Emmetts			
1904	Hibernians			
1903	Brian Borus			
1902	Robert Emmetts			
1901	Robert Emmetts			
1900	Desmond Rovers			
1899	Robert Emmetts			
1898	Robert Emmetts			
1897	Ireland United			

== Records and statistics ==
=== Wins by decade ===
1890s: Robert Emmetts (1898, 99)

1900s: Robert Emmetts (1901, 02, 05, 06)

1910s: Geraldines (1912, 13, 14, 15)

1920s: Fintan Lalors (1922, 23, 27, 28)

1930s: Tara (1933, 34, 37)

1940s: Brian Borus (1941, 42, 43, 44, 45, 46, 48)

1950s: Cuchullians (1951, 52, 54) and Brothers Pearse (1957, 58, 59)

1960s: Brian Borus (1960, 62, 63, 64, 66, 69)

1970s: St Gabriel’s (1973, 74, 76, 77, 78)

1980s: Desmond’s (1983, 85, 88, 89)

1990s: St Gabriel’s (1990, 95, 96, 97, 99)

2000s: Fr. Murphy's (2000, 01, 03, 05) and Robert Emmetts (2004, 06, 07, 08)

2010s: Kilburn Gaels (2010, 14, 17), St Gabriel (2012, 13, 18) and Robert Emmetts (2015, 16, 19)

2020s: St Gabriel (2022, 24, 25) and Brothers Pearse (2020, 23, 26)

== See also ==
- London Senior Football Championship
- London Intermediate Hurling Championship (Tier 2)
- Connacht Intermediate Club Hurling Championship
