= Fr Murphy's GAA =

Gaelic football, hurling and camogie club in London

Fr Murphy's
- An tAthair Ó Murchú
- Founded: 1958
- County: London
- Colours: Purple and Gold
- Grounds: Old Deer Park
- Coordinates: 51°27′55″N 0°18′33″W

Playing kits
Standard colours

Senior Club Championships
	All Ireland	Great Britain champions	London champions
Hurling:	-	-	4

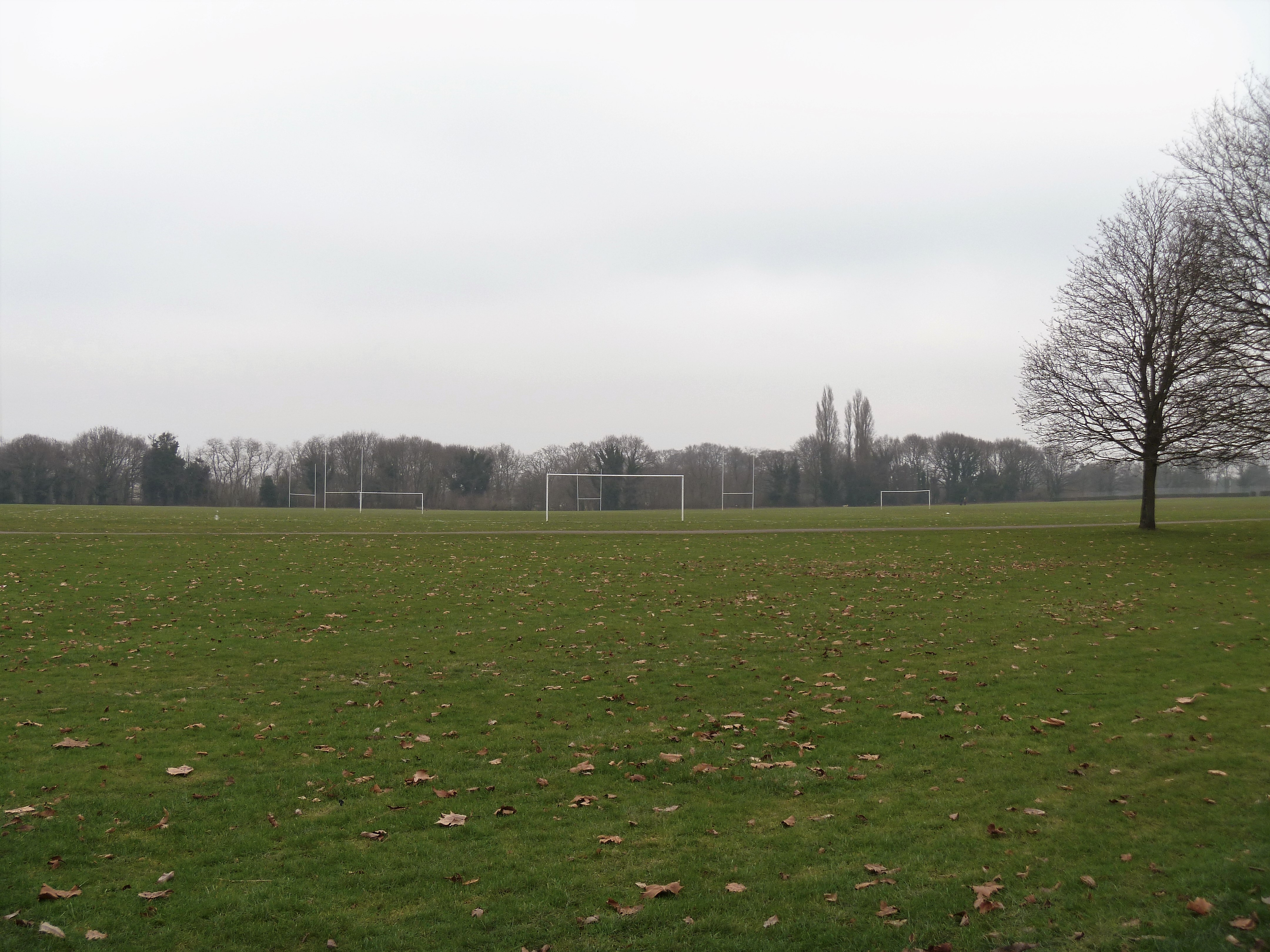
The Old Deer Park, Richmond

Fr Murphy's GAA is a camogie, hurling, Gaelic football and ladies' Gaelic football club based in West London.

== History ==
=== Early Years ===
In 1958, a group of men met in the Sir Robert Peel pub in London with the intention of starting a "Wexfordmen's hurling and football club". After this meeting, it was decided that the club would be known as Father Murphy's, with the club colours to be purple and gold, the same as Wexford.

=== Men's/Youth Teams ===
The club was successful in winning the London Junior Hurling League and Championship titles in 1959. They also reached the Junior Football final that year, but were defeated on the day. 1960 brought London Hurling Intermediate League and Championship titles, which allowed them to step up to senior level in 1961. The footballers also had various successes throughout the 1960's, including an Intermediate league title in 1963 and Junior league title in 1969.

In 1976, the juvenile team won a championship title and in 1977, the adult team won both the intermediate league and championship, securing a historic double, which was captained by Tommy Harrell.

1983 saw under-14 and under-16 football league success and the junior and minor football teams won the McArdle Cup and minor league titles in 1988.

1985 saw the club's senior hurling team win the McCullagh Cup, the Irish Independent Cup, the Senior B League and Senior B Championship.

In 1990, Josie O'Leary was elected to serve as the club's chairman again and over the years, he would serve in nearly every part of the Father Murphy's club, including chairman, selector and president.

The 1990's also brought plenty of success, including a senior hurling league in 1994, intermediate hurling championship in 1996, and a historic intermediate football championship in 1998, the latter of which was captained by Trevor Clancy.

2000 brought huge success to the club, with the hurlers capturing the senior championship, senior league, provincial and All England 7-a-side titles. They then retained these titles the following year.

The senior hurlers played in an All Ireland Quarter-final against Newtownshandrum of Cork in 2003 after winning the British provincial title against John Mitchel's of Warwickshire.

=== Ladies Teams ===
In 1988, a ladies football team was formed within the club - they were successful in tournaments such as the Roundwood Festival with wins in 1990, 1992, 1994, 1995 and 1996. 2001 was a very successful year for the ladies footballers, as they won senior league and championship double, as well as the Mary Feehan Cup.

A camogie team was also started up in 1998, with success in the junior camogie championship by the end of the decade.

In 2003, Father Murphys fielded senior teams in football and camogie, becoming the first team in England to do so. The club also had representation on the inter-county stage that year, fielding for London against Sligo and Derry in All-Ireland football and camogie championships respectively.

The footballers also had success in the mid 2000's, winning the Mary Feehan Cup, while the camogie team appeared in their first senior final in 2006, only to be beaten by Parnell's. In 2007 and 2008 the club won a historic back-to-back double in the senior football and camogie championships.

== Honours ==
=== Hurling ===
London Senior Hurling Championship (4)

- (gold) 2000, 2001, 2003, 2005

London Senior Hurling League (4)

- (gold) 1994, 2000, 2001, 2003

London Senior B Hurling League (1)

- (gold) 1985

London Senior B Hurling Championship (2)

- (gold) 1985, 1991

London Intermediate Hurling Championship (7)

- (gold) 1960, 1977, 1982, 1996, 2016, 2019, 2024

London Intermediate Hurling League (3)

- (gold) 1977, 1981, 1982

London Junior Hurling Championship (3)

- (gold) 1959, 1967, 1968

London Junior Hurling League (2)

- (gold) 1959, 1964

All Britain Junior Club Hurling Championship (5)

- (gold) 2000, 2001, 2003, 2024, 2026

All England 7-a-side Hurling Championship (3)

- (gold) 2000, 2001, 2003

Collins Cup (2)

- (gold) 2000, 2001

All Ireland 7-a-side Kilmacud Shield (1)

- (gold) 2002

=== Gaelic Football ===
London Intermediate Football Championship (1)

- (gold) 1998

London Intermediate Football League (1)

- (gold) 1963

London Junior Football Championship (2)

- (gold) 1969, 1994

London Junior Football League (2)

- (gold) 1979, 1981

London Under 14 Football League (1)

- (gold) 1983

London Under 16 Football League (1)

- (gold) 1983

London Minor Football League (1)

- (gold) 1988

=== Ladies Gaelic Football ===
London Senior Ladies Football Championship (3)

- (gold) 2001, 2007, 2008

London Senior Ladies Football League (4)

- (gold) 1998, 2001, 2002, 2005

Mary Feehan Cup (4)

- (gold) 2001, 2004, 2005, 2006

London Junior Ladies Football Championship (1)

- (gold) 1996

Michael J Butler Shield (4)

- (gold) 1991, 1998, 1999, 2007

Shannon Rovers 9-a-side Tournament (1)

- (gold) 1998

=== Camogie ===
London Senior Camogie Championship (2)

- (gold) 2007, 2008

London Junior Camogie Championship (3)

- (gold) 1998, 2000, 2002

London Junior Camogie League (3)

- (gold) 2000, 2002, 2007
