= Kilburn Gaels GAA =

Kilburn Gaels
- Founded: 1997
- County: London
- Colours: Green and white
- Grounds: St Aloysius Ground, Highgate

Playing kits
Standard colours

Kilburn Gaels Hurling Club is a Gaelic Athletic Association club located in Kilburn, London, England. The club was founded in 1997 and is exclusively concerned with the game of hurling.

== History ==
Kilburn Gaels Hurling Club was founded in 1997 as an amalgamation of the two former London based clubs - Desmonds and Glen Rovers. The juvenile club was established some years earlier in 1991. Both clubs are affiliated to the London County Board. In 2004 the decision was taken to amalgamate the senior and juvenile clubs with the election of the new committee in 2005.

== Honours ==
- London Senior Hurling Championship (3): 2010, 2014, 2017
- All-Ireland Intermediate Club Hurling Championship Runners-up 2015
