= John Mitchel's Hurling Club =

John Mitchel's HC
- CI Seán Mistéil
- Founded: 1933
- County: Warwickshire
- Nickname: The Mitchels
- Colours: Red with white hoop

John Mitchel's Hurling and Camogie Club is a Gaelic Athletic Association club based in Birmingham, England, and is the oldest club in the Warwickshire GAA. It has been long one of the leading Warwickshire clubs in hurling, competing in the county Senior Championship, and in camogie, competing at Junior level. There is an associated Gaelic football club. The club is named after John Mitchel, the 19th-century Irish revolutionary.

== History ==
=== Early 20th century ===
John Mitchel's Hurling Club was formed in 1944 in Coleraine. In fact, the club supplied pitches and playing kit to the county, which is how the Warwickshire hurlers came to have a white strip.

In the early years the club, Paddy Ryan from Pallasgreen, County Limerick and Mick Ryan from County Laois were at the helm. In the 1940s, the club was dominant in all competitions. Then in the 1960s, John Mitchel's built what was arguably their best-ever team - they reached their peak in 1971 winning the Warwickshire championship and getting through to the Championship of Britain final. Here they faced the Brian Boru club in New Eltham, with Mitchel's winning what was a "highly competitive match".

=== Club reformed in 1990s ===
Some years later, the John Mitchel's hurling club folded due to lack of players. But in 1990, the club was reformed, and by 1991 they had regained the Warwickshire Senior Hurling crown. Soon afterwards an underage section was set up in the club. In 2004, the club beat London GAA champions Brothers Pearse to win the club championship of Britain in Ruislip. More than 30 years after that victory in New Eltham, the club had again claimed a British championship and this time went on to the All Ireland club quarter final losing out by a point.

One hurler with the team in their glory days was Billy Collins from Limerick, who remained involved in the club and Warwickshire hurling until his death in 2008. He served as chairman of the County Board for over 25 years. He also helped develop and maintain Páirc na hÉireann, in Solihull, the county's ground. The British Junior Hurling Cup is named after him, the "Billy Collins Cup". Collins' son, Michael, has also served as County Secretary and County Chairman at various times over the last number of years.

John Mitchel's regained the club championship of Britain in 2007, once again against Brothers Pearse in Ruislip, after a drawn game in Páirc na hÉireann.
