= St Gabriel's Hurling Club =

Hurling club in London, England

St Gabriel's
- Naomh Gaibriél
- Founded: 1961
- County: London
- Colours: Blue and gold
- Grounds: Vale Farm Sports Grounds
- Coordinates: 51°33′28″N 0°18′51″W

Playing kits
Standard colours

St Gabriel's Hurling Club is a Gaelic Athletic Association club located in North Wembley, London, England. The club was founded in 1961 and is exclusively concerned with the game of hurling.

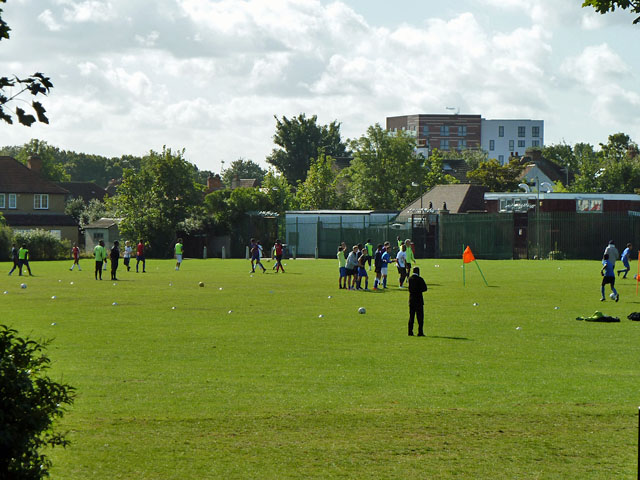
View of Vale Farm Sports Grounds

== Honours ==
- London Senior Hurling Championship (19): 1965, 1973, 1974, 1976, 1977, 1978, 1981, 1986, 1990, 1995, 1996, 1997, 1999, 2009, 2012, 2013, 2018, 2022, 2024
- London Intermediate Hurling Championship (10): 1968, 1973, 1978, 1985, 1986, 1988, 1990, 1991, 2013, 2015
- London Junior Hurling Championship (2): 1961, 1981
- All-Ireland Intermediate Club Hurling Championship runner-up 2013
