= Lancashire Gaelic Football Championship =

Lancashire Senior Football Championship
- Code: Gaelic football
- Founded: 1951; 75 years ago
- Region: Lancashire (GAA)
- Trophy: Joe Cahill and Tommy Walsh Cup
- No. of teams: 7
- Title holders: St Brendans (23rd title)
- Most titles: St Brendans (23 titles)
- Official website: Lancashire GAA

The Lancashire Senior Football Championship is the top-level Gaelic football county championship competition in Lancashire and North West England between the top men's Gaelic football clubs affiliated with Lancashire GAA. The Lancashire-based teams, the majority of whom are based in Manchester and Liverpool, compete against each other for the Joe Cahill and Tommy Walsh Cup, with the winner qualifying for the All-Britain Club Football Championship. The current title holders are St Brendans, who beat John Mitchels in the 2026 final.

Lancashire GAA also operate a 'Junior' championship (also sometimes referred to as 'Junior A'); with teams competing for the Jimmy McKnight Cup; as well as a 'Junior B' championship. As of September 2026, Liverpool Wolfe Tones are the current holders of both the Junior and Junior B Championship titles.

== Teams ==
There are currently 7 adult men's teams competing in Lancashire GAA:

Club name	Location	Pitch
John Mitchels	Greenbank, Liverpool	Greenbank Park
Na Mic Tíre	Warrington	Appleton Thorn
Oisín	Didsbury, Manchester	Old Bedians
St Brendans	Trafford, Manchester	Trafford MV
St Lawrences	Stretford, Manchester	Turn Moss
St Peters	Withington, Manchester	Hough End
Liverpool Wolfe Tones	Wavertree, Liverpool	Wavertree Sports Park

== Senior Championship roll of honour ==
- 1951 Oisín
- 1952 John Mitchels
- 1953 Oisín
- 1954 Shannon Rangers
- 1955 Shannon Rangers
- 1956 Warrington Wolfe Tones
- 1957 Oisín
- 1958 St Wilfrids
- 1959 Oisín
- 1960 Shannon Rangers
- 1961 Harp & Shamrocks
- 1962 Harp & Shamrocks
- 1963 unknown
- 1964 St Brendans
- 1965 John Mitchels
- 1966 John Mitchels
- 1967 St Brendans
- 1968 St Brendans
- 1969 Oisín
- 1970 St Brendans
- 1971 St Brendans
- 1972 St Brendans
- 1973 De La Salle
- 1974 De La Salle
- 1975 St Brendans
- 1976 Oisín
- 1977 Oisín
- 1978 St Brendans
- 1979 St Brendans
- 1980 St Brendans
- 1981 Oisín
- 1982 Oisín
- 1983 St Brendans
- 1984 St Brendans
- 1985 St Brendans
- 1986 St Brendans
- 1987 St Peters
- 1988 St Brendans
- 1989 St Brendans
- 1990 St Brendans
- 1991 St Brendans
- 1992 St Peters
- 1993 St Peters
- 1994 Oisín
- 1995 St Peters
- 1996 St Brendans
- 1997 St Peters
- 1998 St Lawrences
- 1999 John Mitchels
- 2000 St Peters
- 2001 St Peters
- 2002 Oisín
- 2003 St Lawrences
- 2004 St Peters
- 2005 St Peters
- 2006 Oisín
- 2007 John Mitchels
- 2008 John Mitchels
- 2009 John Mitchels
- 2010 St Peters
- 2011 John Mitchels
- 2012 St Peters
- 2013 John Mitchels
- 2014 John Mitchels
- 2015 John Mitchels
- 2016 John Mitchels
- 2017 Oisín
- 2018 Oisín
- 2019 Oisín
- 2020 Oisín
- 2021 St Brendans
- 2022 St Brendans
- 2023 John Mitchels
- 2024 John Mitchels
- 2025 St Brendans
- 2026 St Brendans

=== Wins by team ===
† indicates a team that is now defunct.

Club	SFC wins
St Brendans	23
Oisín	16
John Mitchels	14
St Peters	11
Shannon Rangers	3
De La Salle†	2
Harp & Shamrocks†	2
St Lawrences	2
St Wilfrids†	1
Warrington Wolfe Tones†	1

== Finals by year ==
=== Senior Championship ===
Year	Winner	Score		Runner-up	Venue	Source
2026	St Brendans	0-9	0-6	John Mitchels	Centre of Excellence, Withington	
2025	St Brendans	3-7	0-10	John Mitchels	Old Bedians, Didsbury	
2024	John Mitchels	1-11	1-8	St Brendans	Old Bedians, Didsbury	
2023	John Mitchels	0-10	0-7	St Brendans	Old Bedians, Didsbury	
2022	St Brendans	1-14	1-12	John Mitchels	Old Bedians, Didsbury	
2021	St Brendans	2-11	0-16	John Mitchels	Old Bedians, Didsbury	
2020	Oisín	2-11	2-6	St Brendans	Old Bedians, Didsbury	
2019	Oisín	1-14	1-6	John Mitchels	Old Bedians, Didsbury	
2018	Oisín	3-12	1-6	John Mitchels	Old Bedians, Didsbury	
2017	Oisín	2-18	2-9	John Mitchels	Old Bedians, Didsbury	
2016	John Mitchels	0-10	0-8	St Brendans	Old Bedians, Didsbury	
2015	John Mitchels	0-16	1-8	Oisín	Old Bedians, Didsbury	
2014	John Mitchels	0-13	1-6	Oisín	Old Bedians, Didsbury	
2013	John Mitchels	0-13	0-10	St Brendans	Old Bedians, Didsbury	
2012	St Peters	3-7	0-12	John Mitchels	Old Bedians, Didsbury	
2011	John Mitchels	0-13	0-10	St Brendans	Old Bedians, Didsbury	
2010	St Peters			John Mitchels	Old Bedians, Didsbury	
2009	John Mitchels	3-14	1-6	St Peters	Old Bedians, Didsbury	

=== Junior Championship ===
Year	Winner	Score		Runner-up	Venue	Source
2026	Liverpool Wolfe Tones	2-14	1-10	St Peters	Centre of Excellence, Withington	
2025	Liverpool Wolfe Tones	1-20	0-8	John Mitchels	Greenbank Park, Liverpool	
2024	St Brendans	1-8	0-10	Liverpool Wolfe Tones		
2023	John Mitchels	0-11	1-4	Liverpool Wolfe Tones		
2022	St Brendans	0-14	1-6	Liverpool Wolfe Tones	Old Bedians, Didsbury	
2021	St Lawrences	1-15	1-9	Liverpool Wolfe Tones	Old Bedians, Didsbury	
2020	St Lawrences			St Peters	Old Bedians, Didsbury	
2019	Oisín	0-13	0-9	St Peters	Old Bedians, Didsbury	
2018	St Peters	1-11	2-6	St Brendans	Old Bedians, Didsbury	
2017	Oisín			John Mitchels	Old Bedians, Didsbury	
2016	John Mitchels			St Brendans		

=== Junior B Championship ===
Year	Winner	Score		Runner-up	Venue	Source
2026	Liverpool Wolfe Tones	2-7	0-7	St Lawrences	Turn Moss, Stretford	
2025	St Lawrences	3-19	0-3	Liverpool Wolfe Tones	Old Bedians, Didsbury	
2024	St Peters	1-7	1-3	St Lawrences	Hough End, Withington	
2023	St Brendans			St Peters	Hough End, Withington	
2022	St Brendans	2-6	0-8	St Peters	Old Bedians, Didsbury	
2021	St Brendans			St Peters		
2020	cancelled due to COVID-19					
2019	St Brendans	2-11	2-8	St Lawrences	Old Bedians, Didsbury	
2018	St Lawrences	6-12	2-6	Oisín	Old Bedians, Didsbury	
2017	Oisín	4-7	1-6	St Lawrences	Old Bedians, Didsbury	
2016	St Marys / St Patricks	2-13	1-14	Oisín	Old Bedians, Didsbury	
