= Lancashire GAA =

Gaelic games governing body in England

- Irish: Lancasír
- Founded: 1926; 100 years ago
- Province: Britain
- Ground(s): Centre of Excellence, Withington; Old Bedians, East Didsbury
- County colours: Blue Yellow

County teams
- NHL: Division 4
- Football Championship: All-Ireland Junior Football Championship
- Hurling Championship: Lory Meagher Cup

County colours

The Lancashire County Board of the Gaelic Athletic Association (GAA), known as Lancashire GAA or CLG Lancasír, is one of the county boards outside Ireland and is responsible for Gaelic games in North West England and the Isle of Man. The county board is also responsible for the Lancashire county teams. With Gloucestershire, Hertfordshire, London, Scotland, Warwickshire, and Yorkshire, the board makes up the British Provincial Board.

== History ==
The first Gaelic games recorded in Lancashire were in Liverpool in 1901, with Liverpool Young Irelands defeating Manchester Martyrs in front of around 300 spectators. By 1906, both hurling and camogie were being played regularly in Aintree.

In 1926, Liverpool GAA, the predecessor to Lancashire GAA, became one of the first affiliated boards of the newly-formed British GAA alongside London. The two boards fielded teams annually, in both hurling and football, to play each other for the P.J. O'Connor and Sam Maguire cups respectively. The teams reported Gaelic games around this time were mainly in Liverpool, including Earlestown, Eire Og (now known as John Mitchels), Exiles, Gaels, Kathleen ni Houlihans (a camogie team), Thomas Ashes, and Terence McSwineys, as well as Granuaile in Southport and St Brigid's in Manchester. Liverpool GAA was renamed to Lancashire and District in 1934, and by 1938, only Eire Og remained by the same name, with Sean O'Donovans as the only other club playing hurling and football, and Patrick Pearses and Kevin Barrys playing football only. Club camogie matches were also reported in 1945 between two teams in Manchester, Lamh Deargs and Oisín.

By 1952, there was reported to be 9 clubs playing in Lancashire: Lamh Deargs , Shamrocks, Harp and Shamrocks, and Oisín all in Manchester, John Mitchels in Liverpool, St John's in Rochdale, St Brigid's in Wigan, St Vincent's in Altrincham and St Brendan's in Stockport. Through the 1950s new teams sprouted up across the county; including Cu Chulainns in Preston, Shannon Rangers in Bolton, St Werburgh's in Birkenhead, and Wolfe Tones in Warrington; while a select Lancashire league camogie team travelled over to Ireland to play St Mary's and Lurgan in friendly matches.

In the early 1980s there were only three ladies Gaelic football teams in Manchester; Oisín, St Lawrences and St Richards, the last of whom became Tir Conaill Gaels in 1986. By 1989, there were 6 ladies’ football teams in the Pennine area forming the Pennine League: Emerald Gaels (featuring many of the then defunct Tir Conaill team), St Lawrences, Pride of Eireann and St Brendans all in Manchester, Shannon Rangers in Bolton, and Brothers Pearse in Huddersfield. The Lancashire County Board affiliated to the Ladies' Gaelic Football Association in 1989, and the county team were dominant in British ladies' Gaelic football through the 1990s, winning the All-Britain County Championship in 1994, 1995, 1996, and 1997.

The men's county football team won four successive All-Britain Football Championships between 2010 and 2013, with a fifth title coming in 2016. Lancashire also reached the semi-finals of the All-Ireland Junior Football Championship in 2010 and 2011, losing to Kerry and Kildare respectively. In hurling, Lancashire competed in the Lory Meagher Cup for the first time in 2015, and entered the National Hurling League in 2018, winning the Division 3B title on their first attempt.

In 2026, a €500,000 grant was provided by the Irish Government's Emigrant Support programme to support the new Lancashire Centre of Excellence at Broughton Park. The pitches were opened in June 2026 as part of the 'Northern Community Gaelic Games'.

The county crest depicts the Celtic cross and shamrock, the red rose of Lancashire and a ship representing the voyage taken by all of those who have left Ireland to make Lancashire their home or the place they are passing through. The crest was designed by former county secretary Seán Hackett in 2007.

== Football ==
=== Clubs ===
As of 2026, there are two senior men's teams in Lancashire, John Mitchels and St Brendans, competing in the Lancashire Men's Senior Football Championship. There are 6 clubs currently playing in the Lancashire Men's Junior Football Championships.

There is one intermediate women's team, John Mitchels, who compete in the North of Britain Intermediate Championship against Glaschu Gaels (Glasgow), Dunedin Connollys (Edinburgh), and Roger Casements (Coventry). There are four junior teams competing in the Junior League and Lancashire Ladies' Junior Football Championship.

Club name		Teams	Location	Pitch
English	Irish	Teams	Location	Pitch
Ellan Vannin Gaels	Ellan Vannin	youth only	Douglas, Isle of Man	GAA Grounds, Douglas
John Mitchels	Séan Mistéid	Men's - Senior / Junior / youth Ladies' - Intermediate / Junior / youth	Greenbank, Liverpool	Greenbank Park
Na Mic Tíre	Na Mic Tíre	Men's - Junior / youth	Warrington, Cheshire	Appleton Thorn Playing Fields
Oisín	Oisín	Men's - Junior / youth Ladies' - Junior / youth	Didsbury, Manchester	Old Bedians
St Brendans	Naomh Bréanainn	Men's - Senior / Junior / youth	Trafford, Manchester	Trafford MV RFCC
St Lawrences	Naomh Labhrais na Piarsaigh	Men's - Junior / youth Ladies' - Junior / youth	Stretford, Manchester	Turn Moss
St Marys	Naomh Máire	youth only	Burnage, Manchester	Cringle Playing Fields
St Peters	Naomh Peadar	Men's - Junior / youth	Withington, Manchester	Hough End Playing Fields
Liverpool Wolfe Tones	Uilf Tóin	Men's - Junior / youth Ladies' - Junior / youth	Wavertree, Liverpool	Wavertree Sports Park

=== Lancashire Senior Men's Football Championship winners ===
- 1951 Oisín
- 1952 John Mitchels
- 1953 Oisín
- 1954 Shannon Rangers
- 1955 Shannon Rangers
- 1956 Warrington Wolfe Tones
- 1957 Oisín
- 1958 St Wilfrids
- 1959 Oisín
- 1960 Shannon Rangers
- 1961 Harp & Shamrocks
- 1962 Harp & Shamrocks
- 1963 -
- 1964 St Brendans
- 1965 John Mitchels
- 1966 John Mitchels
- 1967 St Brendans
- 1968 St Brendans
- 1969 Oisín
- 1970 St Brendans
- 1971 St Brendans
- 1972 St Brendans
- 1973 De La Salle
- 1974 De La Salle
- 1975 St Brendans
- 1976 Oisín
- 1977 Oisín
- 1978 St Brendans
- 1979 St Brendans
- 1980 St Brendans
- 1981 Oisín
- 1982 Oisín
- 1983 St Brendans
- 1984 St Brendans
- 1985 St Brendans
- 1986 St Brendans
- 1987 St Peters
- 1988 St Brendans
- 1989 St Brendans
- 1990 St Brendans
- 1991 St Brendans
- 1992 St Peters
- 1993 St Peters
- 1994 Oisín
- 1995 St Peters
- 1996 St Brendans
- 1997 St Peters
- 1998 St Lawrences
- 1999 John Mitchels
- 2000 St Peters
- 2001 St Peters
- 2002 Oisín
- 2003 St Lawrences
- 2004 St Peters
- 2005 St Peters
- 2006 Oisín
- 2007 John Mitchels
- 2008 John Mitchels
- 2009 John Mitchels
- 2010 St Peters
- 2011 John Mitchels
- 2012 St Peters
- 2013 John Mitchels
- 2014 John Mitchels
- 2015 John Mitchels
- 2016 John Mitchels
- 2017 Oisín
- 2018 Oisín
- 2019 Oisín
- 2020 Oisín
- 2021 St Brendans
- 2022 St Brendans
- 2023 John Mitchels
- 2024 John Mitchels
- 2025 St Brendans
- 2026 St Brendans

==== Roll of honour ====
† indicates a now defunct team

Club	Lancashire SFC wins	All-Britain CFC wins	All-Ireland JCFC wins
St Brendans	23	1 (2021)	-
Oisín	16	1 (1994)	-
John Mitchels	14	5 (2007, 2008, 2013, 2014, 2015)	2 x (silver) (2009, 2015)
St Peters	11	3 (2004, 2010, 2012)	-
Shannon Rangers†	3		
De La Salle†	2	1 (1974)	-
Harp & Shamrocks†	2	-	-
St Lawrences	2	-	-
St Wilfrids†	1	-	-
Warrington Wolfe Tones†	1		

=== Lancashire Junior Ladies' Football Championship winners ===
- 1996 Emerald Gaels
- 1997 Emerald Gaels
- 1998 Emerald Gaels
- 1999 Emerald Gaels
- 2000 Emerald Gaels
- 2001 Emerald Gaels
- 2002 Emerald Gaels
- 2003 Emerald Gaels
- 2004 Emerald Gaels
- 2005 -
- 2006 -
- 2007 John Mitchels
- 2008 John Mitchels
- 2009 -
- 2010 Oisín
- 2011 -
- 2012 -
- 2013 -
- 2014 Wolfe Tones
- 2015 Oisín
- 2016 St Lawrences
- 2017 Wolfe Tones
- 2018 Wolfe Tones
- 2019 Oisín
- 2020 not played
- 2021 -
- 2022 St Lawrences
- 2023 St Lawrences
- 2024 St Lawrences
- 2025 Wolfe Tones
- 2026 Oisín

==== Roll of honour ====
Club	Lancashire JLFC wins	All-Britain JLCFC wins	All-Ireland JLCFC wins
Emerald Gaels†	9	9 (1996, 1997, 1998, 1999, 2000, 2001, 2002, 2003, 2004)	-
Oisín	4	3 (2010, 2015, 2019)	-
Liverpool Wolfe Tones	4	1 (2014)	-
St Lawrences	4	-	-
John Mitchels	2	2 (2007, 2008)	-

† defunct

=== County team ===
Lancashire fields a men's county team in the All-Britain Football Championship and a ladies' county team in the Britain LGFA Junior Championship. The Lancashire men have not won the All-Britain since the tournament was restructured in 2022, and so have not yet competed in the new format of the All-Ireland Junior Football Championship.

==== Honours ====
- Men's
  - All-Ireland Junior Football Championship
    - (silver) Runners-Up (4): 1949, 1953, 1958, 1963
  - All-Britain Football Championship
    - (gold) Winners (5): 2010, 2011, 2012, 2013, 2016
    - (silver) Runners-Up (2): 2007, 2009
- Ladies'
  - All-Britain Junior Football Championship
    - (gold) Winners (4): 1994, 1995, 1996, 1997
    - (silver) Runners-Up: 1998

== Hurling and camogie ==
=== Clubs ===
The hurling clubs compete in the Lancashire Senior Hurling Championship and Lancashire Junior Hurling League, along with Yorkshire Emeralds (Leeds) and Ceann Creige (Glasgow). In camogie, Fullen Gaels compete in the Northern Division of the Britain Camogie Senior League against Ceann Creige, with Wolfe Tones competing in the Northern Division of the Intermediate League against Erin Go Bragh and John Mitchels (both Birmingham).

Club name		Teams	Location	Pitch
English	Irish	Teams	Location	Pitch
Fullen Gaels	Fullen Gaels	Hurling - Senior Camogie - Senior	Manchester	Hough End Playing Fields
Na Mic Tíre	Na Mic Tíre	Hurling - Senior	Warrington	Appleton Thorn Playing Fields
Liverpool Wolfe Tones	Uilf Tóin	Hurling - Senior Camogie - Intermediate	Liverpool	Wavertree Sports Park

=== Lancashire Senior Hurling Championship winners ===
- 2014 Fullen Gaels
- 2015 Liverpool Wolfe Tones
- 2016 Fullen Gaels
- 2017 Fullen Gaels
- 2018 Fullen Gaels
- 2019 Fullen Gaels
- 2020 Fullen Gaels
- 2021 Fullen Gaels
- 2022 Fullen Gaels
- 2023 Ceann Creige
- 2024 Fullen Gaels
- 2025 Ceann Creige
- 2026 Fullen Gaels

==== Roll of honour ====
Club	Lancashire SHC wins	All-Britain CHC wins	All-Ireland JCHC wins
Fullen Gaels	10	8 (2010, 2011, 2012, 2013, 2014, 2015, 2016, 2021)	2 x (silver) (2013, 2015)
Ceann Creige	2	-	-
Liverpool Wolfe Tones	1	-	-

=== County team ===
The Lancashire men's hurling team compete in the Lory Meagher Cup, the fifth tier of the All-Ireland Senior Hurling Championship, and Division 4 of the National Hurling League.

==== Honours ====
- Lory Meagher Cup
  - (silver) Runners-Up (2): 2018, 2019, 2023
- All-Ireland Junior Hurling Championship
  - (silver) Runners-Up: 1931
- National Hurling League Division 3B
  - (gold) Winners (1): 2018
