= Scottish Gaelic Football Championship =

Scottish Senior Football Championship
- Code: Gaelic football
- Founded: 1985; 41 years ago
- Region: Scotland (GAA)
- No. of teams: 5
- Title holders: Glasgow Gaels (6th title)
- Most titles: Dúnedin Connollys (18 titles)
- Official website: Scotland GAA on Facebook

The Scottish Senior Football Championship is the top-level Gaelic football county championship competition in Scotland between the top men's Gaelic football clubs affiliated with Scotland GAA. The Scottish teams compete against each other, with the winner qualifying for the All-Britain Club Football Championship. The championship has been contested in its modern form since 1985, and the current title holders are Glasgow Gaels, who beat Dúnedin Connollys in the 2026 final.

== Teams ==
There are currently five adult men's teams competing in Scotland GAA:

| Club name | Location | Pitch |
|---|---|---|
| Dálriada | Aberdeen / Dundee | Sheddocksley Football Pitches |
| Dúnedin Connollys | Edinburgh | Wardie Recreation Ground |
| Glasgow Gaels | Glasgow | Clydebank Community Sports Hub |
| Stirling Carrigans | Stirling | Stirling County Rugby Club |
| Tír Conaill Harps | Cambuslang | Cambuslang Sports Club |

== Senior Championship roll of honour ==
Former winners of the competition include:

- 1985 Clan Na Gael
- 1986 St Patricks
- 1987 St Patricks
- 1988 Beltane Shamrocks
- 1989 Mulroy Gaels
- 1990 Sands MacSwineys
- 1991 Sands MacSwineys
- 1992 Dálriada
- 1993 Dálriada
- 1994 Dúnedin Connollys
- 1995 Mulroy Gaels
- 1996 St Patricks
- 1997 Mulroy Gaels
- 1998 Mulroy Gaels
- 1999 Sands MacSwineys
- 2000 Mulroy Gaels
- 2001 Tír Conaill Harps
- 2002 Glasgow Gaels
- 2003 Dúnedin Connollys
- 2004 Dúnedin Connollys
- 2005 Dúnedin Connollys
- 2006 Glasgow Gaels
- 2007 Dúnedin Connollys
- 2008 Dúnedin Connollys
- 2009 Dúnedin Connollys
- 2010 Dúnedin Connollys
- 2011 Dúnedin Connollys
- 2012 Tír Conaill Harps
- 2013 Dúnedin Connollys
- 2014 Dúnedin Connollys
- 2015 Dúnedin Connollys
- 2016 Dúnedin Connollys
- 2017 Dúnedin Connollys
- 2018 Dúnedin Connollys
- 2019 Glasgow Gaels
- 2020 not played
- 2021 Dunedin Connollys
- 2022 Glasgow Gaels
- 2023 Glasgow Gaels
- 2024 Dúnedin Connollys
- 2025 Dúnedin Connollys
- 2026 Glasgow Gaels

=== Wins by team ===
† indicates a team that is now defunct.

| Club | SFC wins |
|---|---|
| Dúnedin Connollys | 18 |
| Glasgow Gaels | 6 |
| Mulroy Gaels† | 5 |
| St Patricks† | 3 |
| Sands MacSwineys (Note: Sands MacSwineys are still officially a team but do not enter the championships as of September 2026.) | 3 |
| Tír Conaill Harps | 2 |
| Dálriada | 2 |
| Clan Na Gael† | 1 |
| Beltane Shamrocks† | 1 |

== Finals by year ==
=== Senior Championship ===
| Year | Winner | Score | | Runner-up | Venue | Source |
|---|---|---|---|---|---|---|
| 2026 | Glasgow Gaels | 2-12 | 1-12 | Dúnedin Connollys | Clydebank Community Sports Hub, Clydebank | |
| 2025 | Dúnedin Connollys | 3-14 | 4-10 | Glasgow Gaels | Clydebank Community Sports Hub, Clydebank | |
| 2024 | Dúnedin Connollys | 2-9 | 1-5 | Glasgow Gaels | Clydebank Community Sports Hub, Clydebank | |
| 2023 | Glasgow Gaels | 0-15 | 0-10 | Dúnedin Connollys | St Ambrose High School, Coatbridge | |
| 2022 | Glasgow Gaels | 3-15 | 0-10 | Dúnedin Connollys | St Ambrose High School, Coatbridge | |
| 2021 | Dúnedin Connollys | | | Glasgow Gaels | St Ambrose High School, Coatbridge | |
| 2020 | cancelled due to COVID-19 pandemic | | | | | |
| 2019 | Glasgow Gaels | 0-14 | 2-4 | Dúnedin Connollys | St Ambrose High School, Coatbridge | |
| 2018 | Dúnedin Connollys | | | Glasgow Gaels | St Ambrose High School, Coatbridge | |
| 2017 | Dúnedin Connollys | 0-16 | 1-11 | Glasgow Gaels | St Ambrose High School, Coatbridge | |
| 2016 | Dúnedin Connollys | 2-12 | 2-8 | Glasgow Gaels | St Ambrose High School, Coatbridge | |

=== Intermediate Championship ===
| Year | Winner | Score | | Runner-up | Venue | Source |
|---|---|---|---|---|---|---|
| 2026 | Dúnedin Connollys | 0-14 | 1-9 | Tír Conaill Harps | Clydebank Community Sport Hub, Clydebank | |
| 2025 | Tír Conaill Harps | 0-9 | 0-6 | Glasgow Gaels | Clydebank Community Sport Hub, Clydebank | |
| 2024 | Glasgow Gaels | 3-10 | 0-4 | Tír Conaill Harps | Clydebank Community Sport Hub, Clydebank | |
| 2023 | Dálriada / Tír Conaill Harps | | | Dálriada / Tír Conaill Harps | St Ambrose High School, Coatbridge | |
| 2022 | Dálriada | 1-13_{pen} | 2-10 | Dúnedin Connollys | St Ambrose High School, Coatbridge | |
| 2021 | Dúnedin Connollys | | | Dálriada | St Ambrose High School, Coatbridge | |

=== Junior Championship ===
| Year | Winner | Score | | Runner-up | Venue | Source |
|---|---|---|---|---|---|---|
| 2024 | Glasgow Gaels | 1-5 | 0-3 | Sands MacSwineys | Clydebank Community Sport Hub, Clydebank | |
| 2023 | Tír Conaill Harps | 3-10 | 1-7 | Glasgow Gaels | St Ambrose High School, Coatbridge | |
| 2022 | Glasgow Gaels | 6-14 | 3-5 | Sands MacSwineys | St Ambrose High School, Coatbridge | |
| 2021 | Dúnedin Connollys | | | Glasgow Gaels | St Ambrose High School, Coatbridge | |
| 2020 | cancelled due to COVID-19 pandemic | | | | | |
| 2019 | Tír Conaill Harps | 0-15 | 1-6 | Dálriada | St Ambrose High School, Coatbridge | |
| 2018 | Glasgow Gaels | 0-11 | 0-10 | Dálriada | St Ambrose High School, Coatbridge | |
| 2017 | Glasgow Gaels | 1-11 | 2-06 | Dálriada | St Ambrose High School, Coatbridge | |
