= Davitt Shield =

- Founded: 2000
- Region: Scotland (GAA)
- Number of teams: 6
- Current champions: Tir Conaill Harps (2nd time)
- Davitt Shield

The Michael Davitt Shield is a Scottish Gaelic Football pre-season tournament founded in 2001. The competition takes place in the April of each season. The trophy is named after Irish Republican activist and founder of the Irish National Land League, Michael Davitt. Glaschu Gaels were the inaugural champions in 2000 and have won the competition a record four times. On 30 April 2009, Tir Conaill Harps won the competition for the second time in their history after overcoming record winners and city rivals Glaschu Gaels 1-10 to 1-06 in Coatbridge.

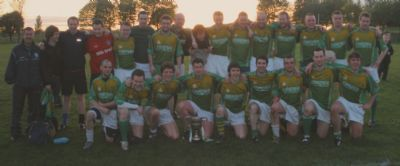
Tir Conaill Harps Davitt Shield winning side of 2009

Year	Winners
2000	Glaschu Gaels
2001	Glaschu Gaels
2002	Glaschu Gaels
2003	Dúnedin Connolly
2004	-
2005	Glaschu Gaels
2006	Tir Conaill Harps
2007	-
2008	-
2009	Tir Conaill Harps
