= Bill McCarthy (dual player) =

Irish hurler and Gaelic footballer (1936–2023)

Personal information
- Native name: Liam Mac Cárthaigh (Irish)
- Born: 1936 Dublin, Ireland
- Died: 10 December 2023 (aged 87) Ardfert, County Kerry, Ireland
- Occupation: Veterinary surgeon

Sport
- Sport: Hurling
- Position: Left corner-forward
Clubs
- Years: Club
- Lees; St Brendan's, Ardfert
Club titles
- Kerry titles: 2
College(s)
- Years: College
- 1953–1955 1955–1959: University College Cork; University College Dublin
College titles
- Fitzgibbon titles: 1
Inter-county
- Years: County
- 1956–1969 1958: Kerry (JH); Kerry (SF)
Inter-county titles
- Munster titles: 0
- All-Irelands: 0
- NHL: 0

William McCarthy (1936 – 10 December 2023) was an Irish hurler and Gaelic footballer. He played at club level with Lees and St Brendan's, Ardfert and at inter-county level with the Kerry junior teams in both codes.

== Career ==
Born in Dublin but raised in Cork, McCarthy first played hurling as a schoolboy at St Finbarr's College and was part of the college's Harty Cup team. As a student at University College Cork, he won a Fitzgibbon Cup medal in 1955. McCarthy later lined out in the Fitzgibbon Cup with University College Dublin, while he also won two Dublin SFL medals.

McCarthy first appeared on the inter-county scene for Cork as a dual player at minor level. His two-year tenure in this grade saw him lose three Munster finals across both codes in 1953 and 1954. McCarthy later declared for Kerry and was part of the Kerry junior team that won their first ever Munster JHC title in 1956. His performances earned his selection for the Munster team in 1957 and he became the first Kerryman to win a Railway Cup medal following a defeat of Leinster in the final.

After adding the first of two National Hurling League Division 2 medal to his collection, McCarthy was called up to the Kerry senior football team for a period. He made appearances against Wexford and Kildare in the early rounds of the 1958–59 league. McCarthy won an All-Ireland JHC medal after being one of the goalscorers in Kerry's defeat of London in the 1961 All-Ireland final.

McCarthy won a Kerry SHC medal with St Brendan's, Ardfert in 1967. He went on to captain the Kerry juniors to a defeat by Warwickshire in the 1968 All-Ireland final, before bringing his inter-county career to an end after a similar defeat in 1969. By that stage McCarthy won a second Kerry SHC with St Brendan's as player-manager in 1975.

== Death ==
McCarthy died on 10 December 2023, at the age of 87.

== Honours ==
University College Cork

- Fitzgibbon Cup: 1955

Lees

- Cork Senior Football Championship: 1955

St Brendan's, Ardfert

- Kerry Senior Hurling Championship: 1967, 1975

Kerry

- All-Ireland Junior Hurling Championship: 1961
- National Hurling League Division 2: 1956–57, 1961–62

Munster

- Railway Cup: 1957

Sporting positions
Preceded by	Kerry junior hurling team captain 1968	Succeeded by Tom Cronin
