= Stirling Carrigans GFC =

Gaelic football club in Stirling, Scotland

- An Carraigín Sruighlea
- Founded: 2025
- County: Scotland
- Colours: Sky Blue and Maroon
- Grounds: Stirling County RUFC
Main Kit	Alternate Kit

Stirling Carrigans is a Gaelic football club in Stirling, Scotland. It was founded in 2025 after university players faced a lack of playing opportunities in the area and had to commute to Glasgow or Edinburgh as a result.

The men's team compete in the Scottish Gaelic Football Championship while the ladies team competes in the Scottish Junior Ladies Football Championship. There is also a youth setup, known as the Stirling Saltires, which was set up in 2026.

Their first competitive final was against Tír Conaill Harps in the 2025 Intermediate Football league, where they lost 1-13 to 1-11.
