= 1969 All-Ireland Junior Hurling Championship =

1969 inter-county junior hurling championship

All Ireland Champions
- Winners: Warwickshire (2nd win)

All Ireland Runners-up
- Runners-up: Kerry
- Captain: Tom Cronin

Provincial Champions
- Munster: Not Played
- Leinster: Louth
- Ulster: Antrim
- Connacht: Leitrim

The 1969 All-Ireland Junior Hurling Championship was the 48th staging of the All-Ireland Junior Championship since its establishment by the Gaelic Athletic Association in 1912.

Warwickshire entered the championship as the defending champions.

The All-Ireland final was played on 12 October 1969 at Austin Stack Park in Tralee, between Warwickshire and Kerry, in what was their second consecutive meeting in the final. Warwickshire won the match by 3–06 to 0–11 to claim their second consecutive All-Ireland title.

== All-Ireland Junior Hurling Championship ==
=== All-Ireland semi-finals ===
17 August 1969 Semi-final	Kerry	5-12 - 5-07	Louth	Croke Park
	C Flaherty 2-1, T McCarthy 1-3, B McCarthy 0-5, J O'Sullivan 1-1, J Gannon 1-0, P McCarthy 0-1, N Power 0-1.		E McGrath 3-1, P O'Brien 1-2, S Maguire 1-0, N Rice 0-1, C McGrath 0-1, P Moran 0-1, M Barry 0-1.

24 August 1969 Semi-final	Antrim	5-08 - 3-06	Leitrim	Casement Park

=== All-Ireland home final ===
5 October 1969 Home final	Kerry	6-11 - 2-10	Antrim	Croke Park
	P McCarthy 2-1, B McCarthy 1-3, P O'Sullivan 1-2, C Flaherty 1-0, J Gannon 1-0, T McCarthy 0-2, P Finnegan 0-2, PJ McIntyre 0-1.		A McCallin 2-5, S Clarke 0-2, G McGarry 0-1, D McMullan 0-1, J O'Neill 0-1.

=== All-Ireland final ===
12 October 1969 Final	Warwickshire	3-06 - 0-11	Kerry	Austin Stack Park
	M Hanley 1-1, B Collins 1-1, J Gilligan 1-0, L Moloney 0-1, M Brennan 0-1, J Brown 0-1, V Coffey 0-1.		TB McCarthy 0-6, B McCarthy 0-2, P Finnegan 0-1, P McCarthy 0-1, J Gannon 0-1.
