= County colours (Gaelic games) =

Kit worn in Irish inter-county GAA competitions

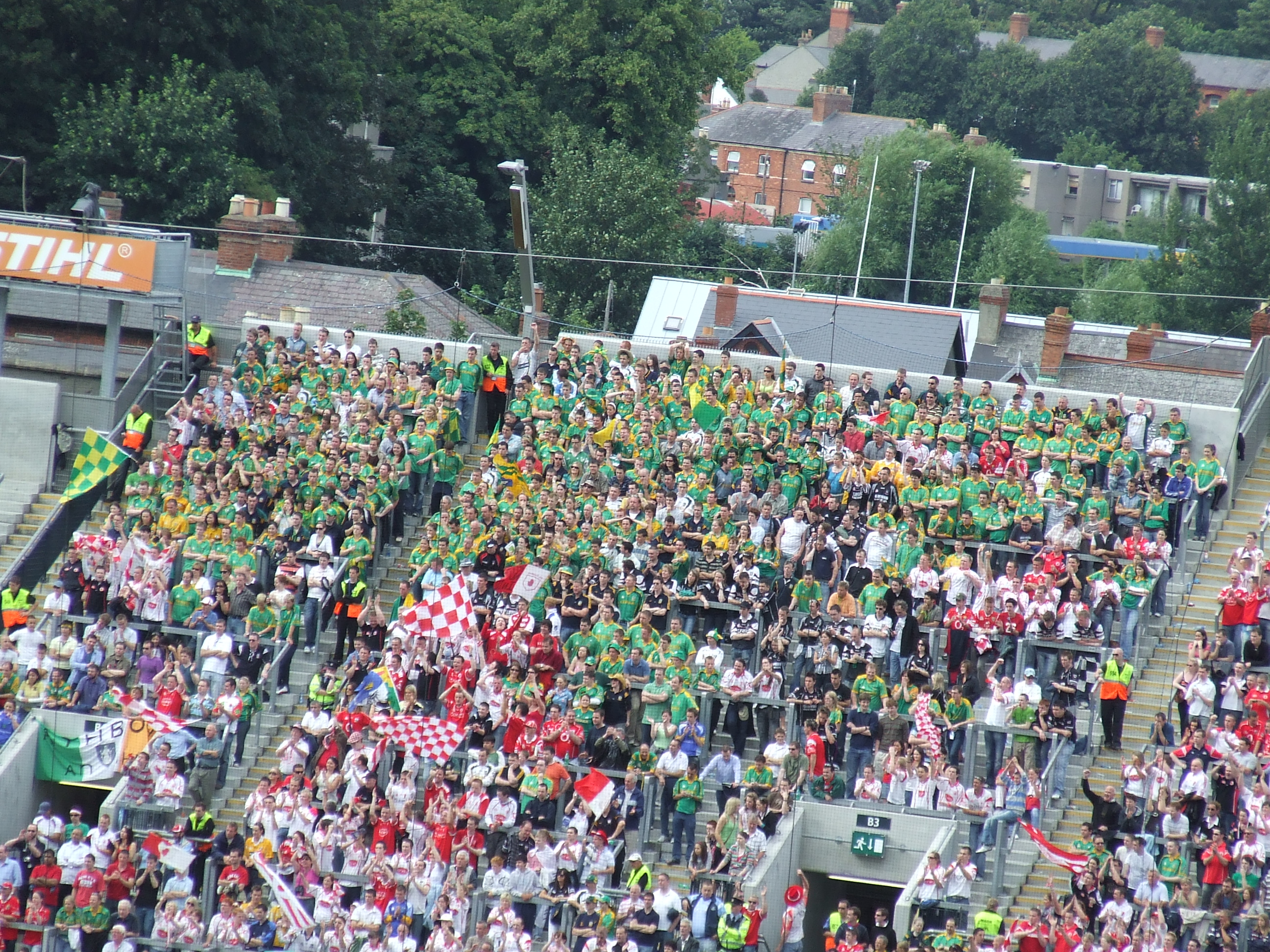
Fans of Tyrone (red and white) and Meath (green and yellow) on Hill 16 in Croke Park watching the teams' 2007 All-Ireland football quarterfinal.

The county colours (Irish: dathanna na gcontaetha) of an Irish county are the colours of the kit worn by that county's representative team in the inter-county competitions of the Gaelic Athletic Association (GAA), the most important of which are the All-Ireland Senior Football Championship and the All-Ireland Senior Hurling Championship. Fans attending matches often wear replica jerseys, and wave flags and banners in the county colours. In the build-up to a major match, flags and bunting are flown or hung from cars, buildings, telegraph poles, and other fixtures across the county, especially in those regions where GAA support is strong.

Where a county's jersey is multi-coloured, these are the county colours. Where the jersey is a single colour, the colour of the shorts is also included. Shorts were always white until Down wore black shorts in the 1968 football final against Kerry, for better contrast in the black-and-white RTÉ telecast. Despite colour telecasts' 1971 arrival, other counties switched from white shorts, such as Dublin's now familiar navy blue.

In the early years of the All-Ireland championships, each county was formally represented by the club which won its county championship; players from other clubs within the county were soon added to reinforce the squad, and gradually from 1900 county committees took over the selection of the team. At that date most inter-county teams still wore the kit of the champion club, but by 1910 some counties had adopted a standard strip. The 1913 GAA Congress passed a motion proposed by P. D. Mehigan and seconded by Harry Boland, "That a distinctive county colour be compulsory for inter-county, inter-provincial and All-Ireland contests, such colours to be approved of by the Provincial Councils concerned and registered with Central Council."

== Flags and arms ==
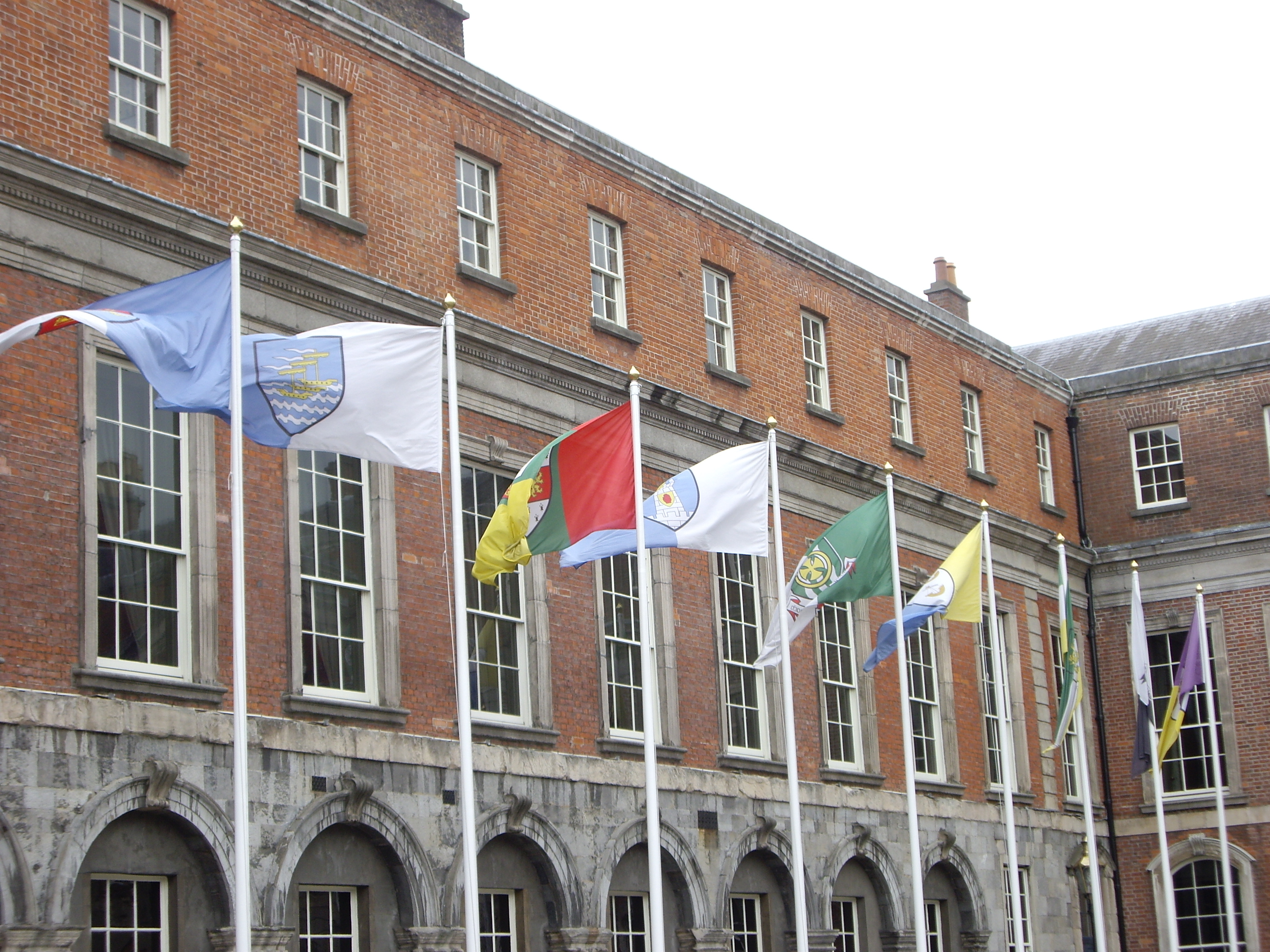
Flags with counties' colours and coats of arms flying in the Upper Yard at Dublin Castle

In the latter half of the 20th century, the county councils of most counties designed coats of arms for registration with the Chief Herald of Ireland. Before then, the arms of the county town often served as arms for the county. The council arms often include the county colours established by the GAA team; examples include Clare and Laois.

There are no official county flags; flags with the GAA county colours serve as de facto county flags. There are no standardised formats for these, except Kildare whose flag, like their kit, is all-white. Typically, flags are formed as vertical bicolours or tricolours, with the major colour nearest the hoist. Horizontal stripes are also found. This is common in County Offaly, where vertical county colours might be mistaken for the flag of Ireland; however other Offaly fans deliberately exploit this double significance. Flags with checkerboard, repeating stripes, and other patterns are also found. Flags have been commercially produced which add the county arms to the colours, sometimes augmented with the county name in English or Irish. Such flags have been flown by the government of Ireland in the Upper Yard at Dublin Castle. County jerseys formerly often included the county crest, but since the 1980s county boards have developed their own logos; most were originally based on the official county arms, but some have since been replaced with unrelated designs. Flags with these logos added to the county colours are sold by or under licence from the county board.

Fans may also wave other flags of the appropriate colours. For example, among the red-and-white flags used by individual Cork supporters have been the flag of Canada and the ensign of the Imperial Japanese Navy. The occasional flying of the American Confederate flag at matches by Cork fans was banned in 2020 by the Cork County Board chairwoman because of its association with slavery and racism in the American South. Blue-and-gold flags used by Tipperary and Roscommon supporters have included the national flags of Sweden and of Ukraine; Mayo fans have flown the green and red of Italy, Portugal and Bangladesh. Kerry supporters may wave the flag of Brazil both for its matching colours and to compare Kerry's continual success in Gaelic football to the Brazil national team's in soccer.

County nicknames interact with county colours. Wexford's colours reflect the pre-existing nickname "the Yellowbellies", while Kildare's give rise to its nickname "the Lilywhites". As Cork is nicknamed the "Rebel County", its fans have also flown the Confederate battle flag; the county board banned this in 2020 in response to the George Floyd protests.

== List ==
Colours of Irish counties
| Flag | County | Province | Colours | Notes |
|---|---|---|---|---|
| | Antrim | Ulster | Saffron and White | Adopted from the Seans club of West Belfast. |
| | Armagh | Ulster | Orange and White | Up to 1926 Armagh wore black and amber. In 1926 they played Dublin in the All-Ireland Junior Football Championship Semi-Final and wore orange jerseys knitted by Poor Clare nuns from Omeath, County Louth. |
| | Carlow | Leinster | Red, Yellow Green | Up to 1910, Carlow wore the colours of the county champions. In that year a set of green jerseys with red and yellow hoops were adopted. These colours inspired Derek Ryan's song "Red, Yellow And Green." |
| | Cavan | Ulster | Blue and White | Royal blue has been worn since 1910; it may have been borrowed from the Cavan Slashers club. The white trim was added for the 1947 All-Ireland Senior Football Championship Final in New York City. |
| | Clare | Munster | Saffron and Blue | Colours taken from the Tulla club, the first to be formed in the county. |
| | Cork | Munster | Red and White | In 1913 Cork wore blue jerseys with a large yellow "C" in front. In a 1919 raid in by British troops on the county board rooms in Cook Street, the jerseys were taken. So, Cork used the jerseys of the St Finbarr's Total Abstinence Hall team, which were dark red/maroon, and Cork have worn red ever since. An apocryphal story claims that the colours derive from Church of St Anne, Shandon, which has walls of red sandstone and white limestone. |
| | Derry | Ulster | White and Red | Red was the traditional Derry colour; they wore black and white hoops in the 1930s; Derry adopted white jersey with a red hoop for the 1946–47 National Football League final and have worn them since. |
| | Donegal | Ulster | Gold and Green | Origin unclear. Originally green was the dominant colour, but in the 1992 All-Ireland Senior Football Championship Donegal switched to a mostly-gold strip. |
| | Down | Ulster | Red and Black | Down wore red until 1922; blue with white trim for ten years; and then changed back to a red or scarlet jersey with black collar and cuffs in 1933. Black shorts, at the time a novelty in Gaelic games when all players generally wore white, were first worn in 1962. |
| | Dublin | Leinster | Sky Blue and Navy | In April 1913, Harry Boland chaired the Dublin County Board meeting at which "after some discussion, it was decided to adopt as the county colours a light blue jersey with a white shield bearing the city arms". |
| | Fermanagh | Ulster | Green and White | Originally green and white hoops, the colours of county champions Teemore. Around 1934/35 a green jersey with yellow trim was used, later changed to white trim. |
| | Fingal (North Dublin) | Leinster | Purple and White | Fingal is not one of the 32 traditional counties of Ireland, but one of four local government areas in the historical area of County Dublin. Its county hurling team competed separately from Dublin from 2008 to 2016, but its management fell under the Dublin county board. "Fingal Purple" has been used by Fingal County Council as its official colour since its founding in 1994. |
| | Galway | Connacht | Maroon and White | Originally played in the colours of the county champions. Maroon jerseys were adopted around 1936. |
| | Kerry | Munster | Green and Gold | Adopted in the 1903 All-Ireland Football Final as the colours of the then dominant Tralee Mitchels senior team. |
| | Kildare | Leinster | All White | Kildare wore the colours of the county champions originally. They played in Clane's all-white strip during the 1903 Leinster Senior Football Championship, which they won, and continued to use those colours. Clane's white jerseys were borrowed from those of Clongowes Wood College. However, a separate account claims that Clane played in black and green, and that the white colour comes from a singlet worn by Joe Rafferty, a star player in 1903. |
| | Kilkenny | Leinster | Black and Amber | Wore black and amber in the 1893 All-Ireland Senior Hurling Championship Final, bought from the defunct Thomas Larkins football club. They also wore black and amber in the 1905 All-Ireland Senior Hurling Championship Final replay. Arguments over county colours went on until November 1911 with the presentation of a set of jerseys by John F. Drennan. |
| | Laois | Leinster | Blue and White | Laois wore black and amber hoops when they won the 1915 All-Ireland Senior Hurling Championship. A blue jersey with white hoop was adopted in 1932. |
| | Leitrim | Connacht | Green and Gold | Green with a gold hoop dates from about 1917, though white and green was sometimes worn in the 1920s. |
| | Limerick | Munster | Green and White | Wore green with a white sash when winning the 1918 All-Ireland Senior Hurling Championship Final but in the 1921 final wore green and white hoops. The present jersey was adopted in 1924. |
| | Longford | Leinster | Blue and Gold | Origin unclear. Jerseys belonging to Clonguish Gallowglasses (white with green hoop) used by Longford teams for a brief period in 1900's and early 1910's, after which a royal blue jersey with a gold sash was adopted. The sash disappeared around 1930 leaving royal blue jersey with gold cuffs and collar which remains the county colours today. |
| | Louth | Leinster | Red and White | Louth have worn red and white since 1885. They wore all-red for a time in the 1970s. |
| | Mayo | Connacht | Green and Red | Claimed to have been inspired by the Thomas Davis poem "The Green above the Red." Inspired the Saw Doctors song "The Green and Red of Mayo." |
| | Meath | Leinster | Green and Gold | A green jersey with a gold sash was used by the Meath team from 1908. |
| | Monaghan | Ulster | White and Blue | Up to 1913, the colours of the county champions were worn. The white jersey then had a blue band around 1920. Black and amber were used for a while in the 1930s but by 1937 the original white with blue trim was reintroduced. |
| | Offaly | Leinster | Green, White and Gold | Many teams played in the colours of the Irish flag; supposedly Offaly earned the right to use them in Leinster aftering winning a competition. Other accounts claim it comes from green, white and gold shirts worn by the Tullamore club in 1917, and hidden during the Irish War of Independence. |
| | Roscommon | Connacht | Primrose and Blue | The Roscommon jersey was either black and amber or black and white prior to 1938. Blue with a yellow band, or black with a green hoop, was also used. The present colour scheme was adopted for the 1943 All-Ireland Senior Football Championship Final. |
| | Sligo | Connacht | Black and White | At one time the Sligo jersey was all black, with a white band being later added. From 1970 the county teams wore mostly white, before switching to black shirts for a famous win over Kildare in the 2001 All-Ireland Senior Football Championship; Sligo have continued to wear black shirts since. |
| | Tipperary | Munster | Blue and Gold | Up to about 1925 Tipperary wore the colours of the county champions. In 1925 the present gold hoop on a blue jersey was introduced, taken from the Tubberadora club. |
| | Tyrone | Ulster | White and Red | Colours derive from the Red Hand of Ulster on a white field, the symbol of the Uí Néill dynasty, adopted around 1927 and definitely before 1931. They also wore green and gold hoops for a time in the 1930s, but soon revered to white and red. |
| | Waterford | Munster | White and Blue | Waterford wore the royal blue shirts of Munster with white cuffs. In 1938 the jersey was changed to white with royal blue trim. |
| | Westmeath | Leinster | Maroon and White | Up to 1912 Westmeath wore a green jersey with a white hoop. This was later changed to a maroon jersey with a saffron sash. The sash was dropped in 1936. In 1937 their kit was described as "dark red", and they have played in maroon since then. |
| | Wexford | Leinster | Purple and Gold | Purple and amber was introduced in 1913. In 1937 they wore blue and saffron. Since then Wexford have generally worn purple and gold, although the degree of each colour has varied. |
| | Wicklow | Leinster | Blue and Gold | Bray Emmets were Wicklow county champions at the turn of the century and wearing a green jersey and gave their colours to the Wicklow team, who wore green until the early 1930s. Blue with a gold hoop was used until a changeover to the present style in 1970. |

== Provinces ==
The GAA Interprovincial Championship had a high profile in the mid 20th century. The provincial teams' colours are seldom used as flags in the manner of county colours; instead the pre-existing provincial arms are used as banners.

Colours of GAA provinces
| Province | Banner of arms | GAA colours |
|---|---|---|
| Connacht | | White and Blue |
| Leinster | | Green and White |
| Munster | | Blue and Navy |
| Ulster | | Gold and Black |

== Outside Ireland ==
There are boards for areas of the Irish diaspora treated as counties within the GAA system. Those in Great Britain come under the British Provincial Board.

Colours of GAA counties outside Ireland
| Flag | County | Colours | Notes |
|---|---|---|---|
| | Asia | Red and White | |
| | Gloucestershire | Gold and Green | |
| | Hertfordshire | Green and Yellow | |
| | Lancashire | Blue and Yellow | |
| | London | Green and White | Green shirts are the colour of Ireland. |
| | Scotland | Navy and White | |
| | Warwickshire | Black and White | |
| | Yorkshire | Blue and White | |
| | New York | Red, White and Blue | Covers the New York metropolitan area. Colours taken from the flag of the United States. |
| | North America | Red, Blue and White | County Board of the United States and Canada excluding New York |
| | Australasia | Green and Gold | County board of Australia and New Zealand. Colours are the Australian national colours. |

== See also ==
- List of Irish counties' coats of arms. These are the coats of arms of the county councils; the GAA counties have separate crests, often based on the county council's.
