= Eastfield, South Lanarkshire =

Coordinates: 55.821°N 4.186°W

Eastfield
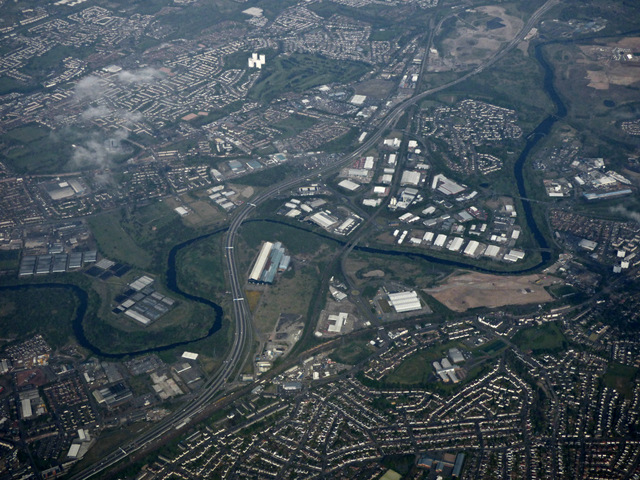
- Aerial photograph of the area from the South-west (2017)

- Location within Scotland Eastfield (Scotland)
- OS grid reference: NS630308
- Country: Scotland
- Sovereign state: United Kingdom
- Post town: GLASGOW
- Postcode district: G72 7 / G73 3
- Dialling code: 0141
- Police: Scotland
- Fire: Scottish
- Ambulance: Scottish
- UK Parliament: Rutherglen
- Scottish Parliament: Rutherglen

Eastfield is a mainly residential district in South Lanarkshire, Scotland, located between the industrial towns of Rutherglen and Cambuslang in the south-east of the Greater Glasgow urban area. It is situated south of the River Clyde, adjoining the Stonelaw and Burnside neighbourhoods of Rutherglen, and Silverbank in Cambuslang.

== History ==
In the late 19th and early 20th century Eastfield was a country estate with a burn running through it; a brewery (Wellshot), a brickworks and a small mining community was also present in the area, with cottages along Cambuslang Road (nowadays part of the A724) complemented by Eastfield Public School, constructed in 1898.

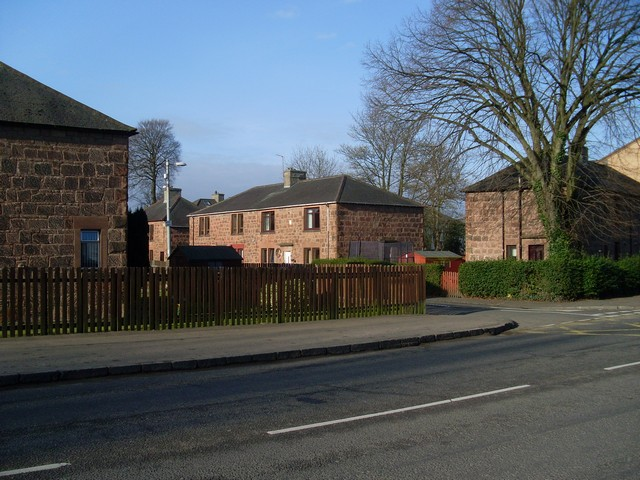
Houses on Whinfield Avenue

The Eastfield estate was developed with housing between the 1930s and 1960s, with mix of council-rented and private homes.

Throughout the 20th century, a prominent feature in the district was Richmond Park Laundry, at one time one of the largest such operations in the country. The facility opened around 1907, closed in 2004, and the premises were demolished in 2007 and replaced by a supermarket.

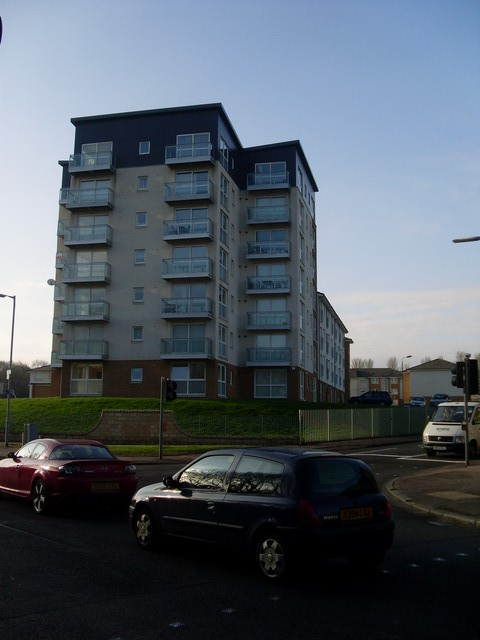
modern flats on Dukes Road

Parcels of land in Eastfield were found to have been contaminated by chromium waste from the Whites Chemical Works, the most conspicuous of which was a large play area made from a filled-in quarry at the end of Dukes Road; this site stood empty and fenced-off for a number of years before the waste was eradicated, and now modern apartments and a new landscaped park (Quarryfield) occupies the site.

In the 21st century the area derives economic benefit from the extension of the nearby M74 motorway which brings nationwide businesses to Eastfield's doorstep. Nearby to the north is one of Scotland's last steelworks at Clydebridge, previously a major employer in the area but operating in a greatly reduced capacity than in its heyday.

== Amenities ==
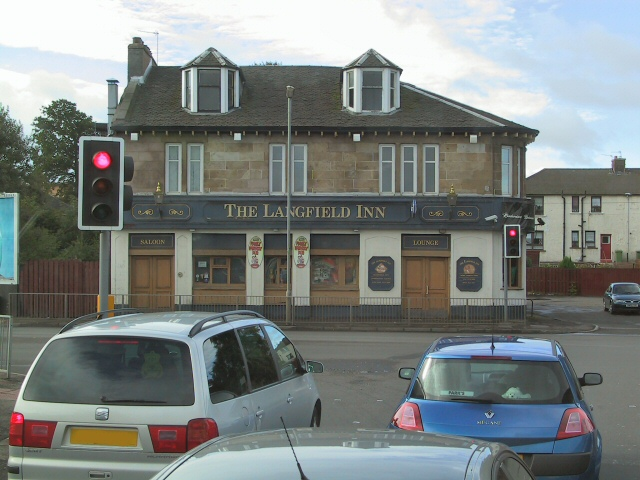
Langfield Inn (public house, demolished 2006)

The imposing sandstone building of the public school was converted for as a local adult education centre and infant playgroup but was demolished in the early 21st century and replaced by modern apartments. The same fate befell the local public house across the road, The Langfield Inn, a few years later. Two pubs survive in the district, both off Dukes Road: the Old Oak Inn and the County Inn, a 1960s replacement for the County Bar in nearby Silverbank, Cambuslang, demolished in a redevelopment of that area which replaced outdated tenements with maisonettes.

=== Transport ===
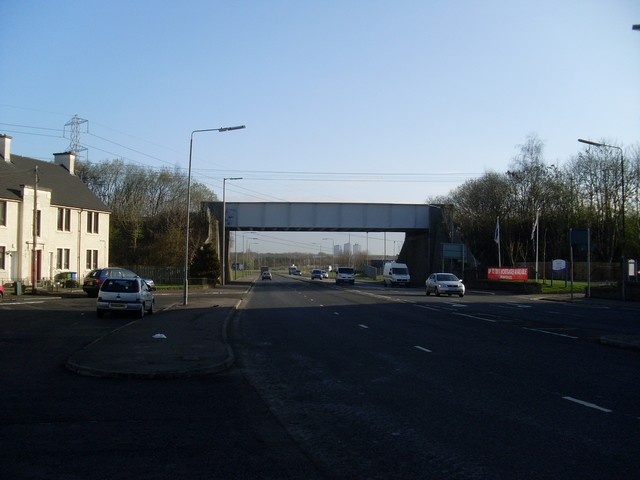
Bogleshole Road, with railway bridge carrying the West Coast Main Line

The Richmond Park name was familiar to some bus users as the terminus for the First Glasgow No 12 service (there is another Richmond Park, an urban park at Oatlands, Glasgow a few miles to the west, which some buses bound for Eastfield such as the frequent 267 also pass).

The West Coast Main Line railway tracks run to the north of the district, with the nearest stations being at Cambuslang about 0.6 miles (0.97 km) to the east of the junction of Bogleshole Road, and Rutherglen around twice that distance to the west. Burnside railway station, on a different line serving the south side of Glasgow, is 1.2 miles (1.9 km) from the Richmond Park roundabout but only 0.4 miles (0.64 km) from the Dukes Road shops at southern end of Eastfield.

=== Education and recreation ===
The wider area is home to two large modern secondary schools: Stonelaw High, built 1998, and Trinity High, built 1970, rebuilt 2009 - for which the northern approach path off Cambuslang Road was the old driveway to the Eastfield mansion. Trinity High's associated sports facilities, including a grid of 5-a-side astroturf football fields (converted to two for the more popular 7-a-side variety in 2021) and a modern swimming pool / leisure centre open to the public as South Lanarkshire Lifestyle Eastfield are located next to the school itself. Adjacent to Stonelaw High is Calderwood Primary School which many local children attend, although geographically that is outwith the territory of Eastfield.

=== Pearse Park ===
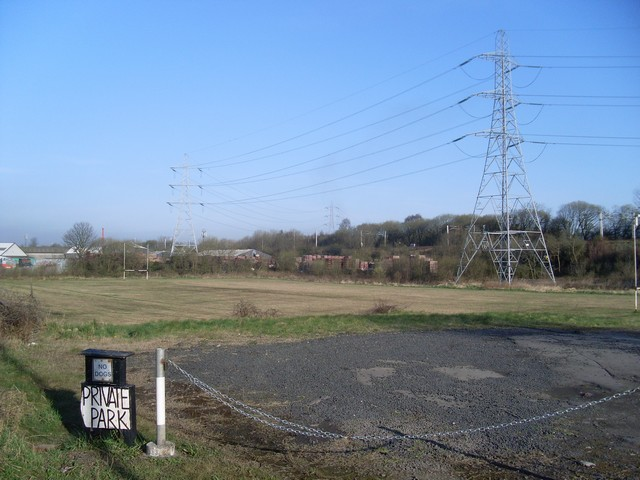
Pearse Park, GAA field, in 2009

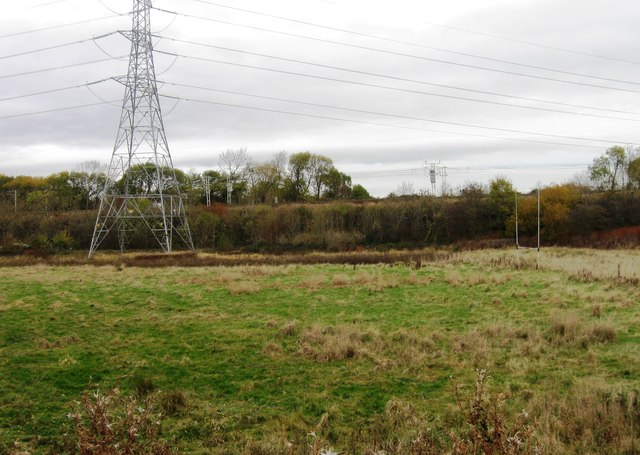
The ground lying neglected in 2013

Pearse Park was the playing field that was the adopted home of Gaelic games in Scotland, situated on Cambuslang Road in Eastfield. It was purchased by Scotland GAA in 1953 and is named after the Irish revolutionary Patrick Pearse. It was also home to Tír Conaill Harps. Closed in 2005, the park lay unused and overgrown for several years and developed a Japanese knotweed infestation problem; however by 2021 plans for its redevelopment were advancing.

== Administration ==
Part of the territory which is generally considered to be part of Eastfield (east of Dukes Road, including the community centre) is within the civil parish of Cambuslang and its G72 postcode zone, while the remainder is within Rutherglen's G73 parish and postal zone. The entire district is currently administered as part of the Cambuslang West ward of the South Lanarkshire Council area, which is also the extent of the local community policing zone; however this definition also encompasses several other streets which have always been considered to be in Rutherglen, such as Ettrick Crescent.
