= Tír Conaill Harps =

Gaelic football club in Glasgow, Scotland

Tír Conaill Harps GAC
- CLG Cláirsigh Thír Conaill
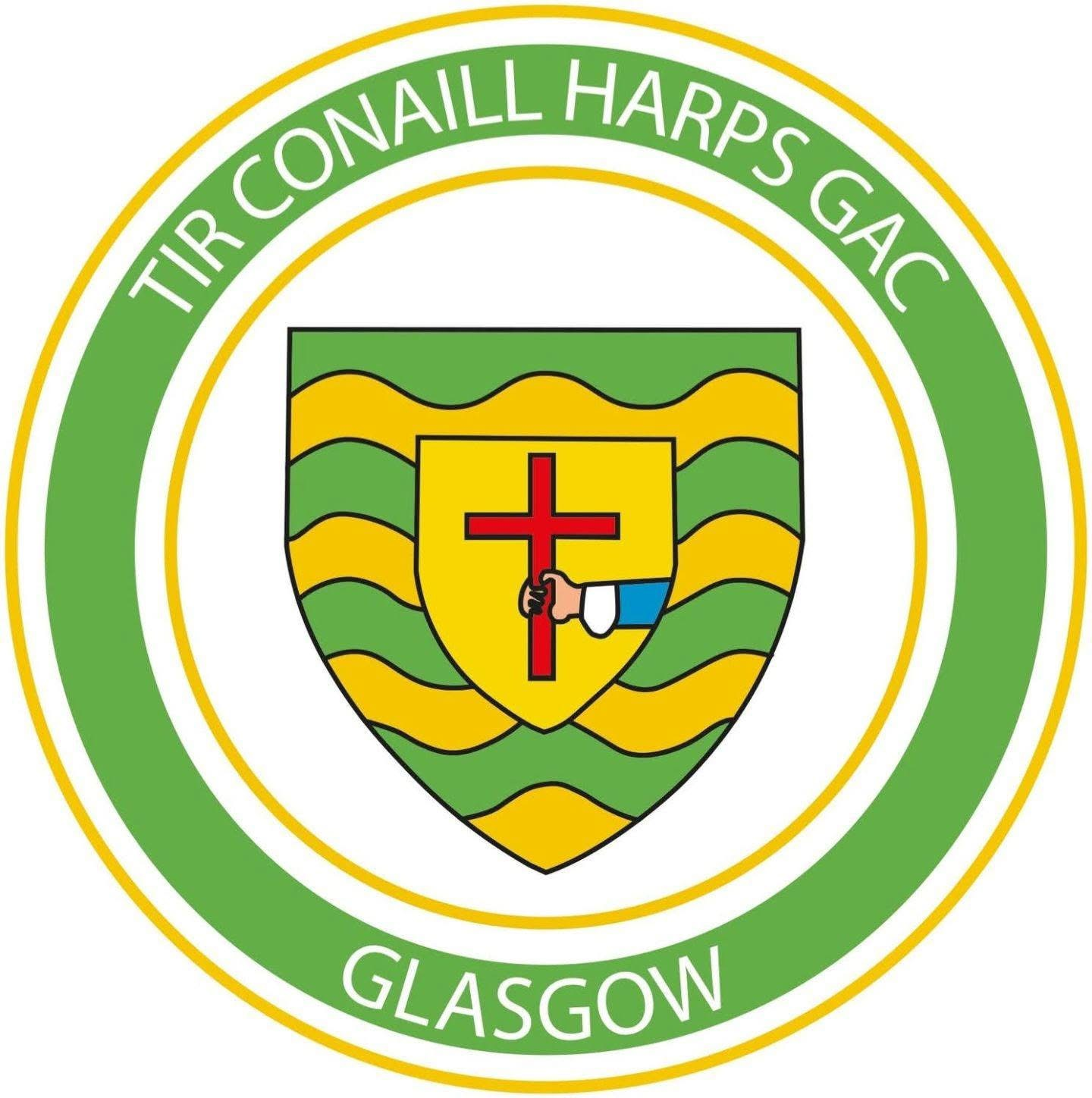
- Founded: 1994
- County: Scotland
- Nickname: The Harps; Na Cláirsigh
- Colours: Green and Gold; Glas agus Buí
- Grounds: Cambuslang Rugby Club, Cambuslang
Alternate Kit	Main Kit

Tír Conaill Harps Gaelic Athletic Club (GAC), (Irish: Cumann Lúthchleas Gael Cláirsigh Thír Conaill) is a Gaelic football club based in Glasgow, Scotland. The club takes its name from Tír Chonaill, the ancient Gaelic kingdom roughly corresponding to modern day County Donegal. The club's primary colours are green and gold.

== History ==
Tír Conaill Harps was formed in 1994 when the Pearse Harps underage football section left to form the club at a meeting in the Govanhill Neighbourhood Centre, in Glasgow's south side. The club is also a community based registered charity.

Tír Conaill Harps have also historically fielded a women's shinty team, winning the Valerie Fraser Camanachd Cup in 2008, defeating Glengarry. They were also runners-up in the competition in 2009 and 2010. Hurling and Camogie were also part of the club's set up, before Ceann Creige was established in 2019.

In 2024, the club celebrated its 30th anniversary at Christ the King Church Hall, with Jerry O'Donovan, Scottish Consul General of Ireland, as guest speaker.

== Home Ground ==
The club is traditionally linked with Glasgow's South side and played their Gaelic football home games at the GAA owned Pearse Park in Cambuslang. After the GAA condemned the park for health and safety reasons, the club moved to Nethercraigs Sports Complex, Corkerhill using a rugby pitch. Glasgow City Council then constructed a Gaelic ground in Bellahouston Park for the club to play their home matches. However, the poor playing surface had seen the club forced to remain at nearby Nethercraigs.

In 2015 the senior and junior teams played and trained at Thornliebank, at Boydstone Road. The club eventually opted for Cambuslang Rugby Club and as of 2019 the club base all games and training sessions there.

== Men's Gaelic Football ==
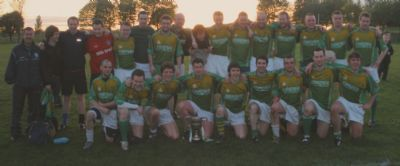
Tír Conaill Harps Davitt Shield winning side of 2009

In the 2001 season, Tír Conaill Harps won the League and Championship titles. This was followed by a league win the following year. In 2006 and 2009 they also won the Michael Davitt Shield.

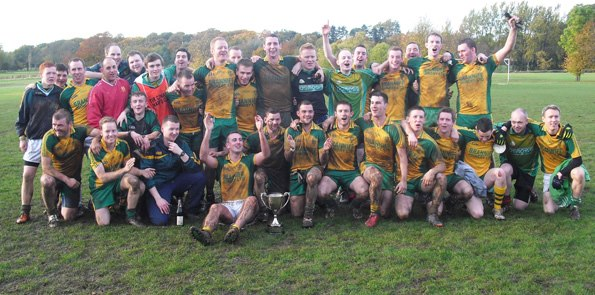
Tír Conaill Harps 2012 Senior Championship winning side

In 2012, they reached all three major finals - they lost the league final to Edinburgh side Dunedin Connollys. Both sides met again in both the Davitt Shield and Championship finals, defeating Dunedin Connollys on both occasions.

They reached the league final in 2013 and were beaten by Dunedin Connollys.

In 2019, the club beat Dalriada GFC in both the junior league and championship - as a result Tír Conaill Harps were promoted, fielding teams at both Junior and Intermediate level for the following season.

== Ladies' Gaelic Football ==
In 2021 the club pushed forward the promotion of new ladies team, and worked to recruit players for the upcoming season. The Tír Conaill Harps Ladies played their first game in a Gaelic 7's tournament held in Edinburgh.

== Youth teams ==
When Tír Conaill Harps was formed in 1994 the club initially solely focused on the youth, until forming senior teams later on.

The club currently fields teams in the following age groups:

- Mixed - U7, U9, U11
- Boys - U13, U15, U17
- Girls - U12, U14, U16

In 2019, the club was restructured to allow home grown players to feed into the adult teams.

== Honours ==
=== Gaelic Football ===
- Scottish Senior Championship Winners: 2001, 2012
- Scottish Senior League Winners: 2001, 2002
- Scottish Intermediate Championship Winners: 2023, 2025
- Scottish Intermediate League Winners: 2022, 2023, 2025, 2026
- Scottish Junior Championship Winners: 2019, 2023
- Scottish Junior League Winners: 2019
- Scottish Ladies Junior Championship Shield Winners: 2026
- Michael Davitt Shield Winners: 2006, 2009, 2012
- Scottish Homegrown Championship Winners: 2014, 2016, 2018
- Under 16s British Championship Winners: 1999
- U12's Scottish Championship Winners: 2010, 2021
- U15s Scottish Championship Shield Winners: 2026

=== Women's Shinty ===
- Valerie Fraser Camanachd Cup: 2008
