= Scotland GAA =

Gaelic games governing body in Scotland

- Irish: Albain
- Founded: 1897; 129 years ago
- Province: Britain
- Ground(s): Pearse Park, Eastfield (disused); Clydebank Community Sports Hub, Clydebank; St Ambrose High School, Coatbridge
- County colours: Navy White

County teams
- Football Championship: All-Ireland Junior Football Championship

The logo of the Scotland Ladies' Gaelic Football Association

The Scotland County Board of the Gaelic Athletic Association (GAA), known as Scotland GAA or CLG na hAlban, is one of the county boards of the GAA outside Ireland, and is responsible for Gaelic games in Scotland. The county board is also responsible for the Scottish county teams. With Gloucestershire, Hertfordshire, Lancashire, London, Warwickshire, and Yorkshire, the board makes up the British Provincial Board.

== History ==
The first Gaelic games club in Scotland was Red Hugh O'Neills, founded in the east end of Glasgow in 1897. Through 1901 and 1902, various clubs were being founded by Irish immigrants in Glasgow and the east of Scotland, with links to local Conradh na Gaeilge clubs commonplace. This included the Rapparees in Jordanhill, the Faughs in Whiteinch, Éire Óg in Port Glasgow, Cúchulains in Polmadie, and Patrick Sarsfields in Coatbridge. In 1903, the original county board of Glasgow was formed, including the Rapparees, Patrick Sarsfields, and Cúchulains, as well as the Shamrocks in Wishaw, Fag-an-Bealachs in Carfin, Finn MacCumhails in Anderston/Partick, and Hibernians in Pollockshaws. More clubs would follow over the next few years, including Clan na Ghaeldhilge in Springburn, Lambh Dearg in Kinning Park, and both Cavan Slashers and Fianna Eireann in central Glasgow.

In early 1905, the GAA in Scotland had acquired the status of a 'province' with county boards in Glasgow and Lanarkshire. The dominant sport at the time was hurling, with June 1905 seeing an England-Scotland hurling fixture in Liverpool. In 1913, Scotland played Kilkenny (then back-to-back All-Ireland champions) in a hurling fixture at Celtic Park.

A combination of competing Irish-cultural interests (such as Celtic Football Club and the Irish National Forresters), the First World War, the Irish War of Independence, and the slowing of Irish migration to Scotland, all contributed to Gaelic games in Scotland diminishing in size in the inter-war years. While Scotland GAA was re-organised in 1921, the rise in anti-Irishness and anti-Catholicism in Scotland led to a perception amongst migrant populations to be discreet in order to progress socially. The 1920s was not insignificant, however; the first recorded camogie match in Scotland was played in 1922 between Granuailes of Glasgow and Taras of Gourock.

While there was little in the way of organised Gaelic games in the 1930s, the up-turn in Irish migration after the Second World War led to the re-establishment of Glasgow GAA, and new clubs were founded in Glasgow and the surrounding area. This included Paisley Gaels (later known as Clan na Gael) in Paisley, Tara Harps in Carmyle, Éire Óg in the Gorbals, St Eunans and Roger Casements in Clydebank, Round Towers in Scotstoun and Fintan Lalors in Govan. Teams were also seen outside of the Greater Glasgow area, including St Francis in Falkirk, St Patricks in Greenock and St Colmcilles in Edinburgh.

This period saw a shift towards football as the dominant code, with Glasgow County included in the All-Ireland Junior Football Championship in August 1952, and 1954 seeing Glasgow play Antrim and Monaghan at Casement Park and St Tiernach's Park respectively. In 1953, the Gaelic Athletic Association purchased an area of land in Eastfield, to the south-east of Glasgow, which would become Eastfield Park, later renamed to Pearse Park in 1979. The ground was formally opened with a match between Glasgow and opponents from Lancashire.

While Gaelic games went through a short period of success, with numerous games being played at Eastfield, and appearances by Glasgow in the Ulster Senior Club Football Championship (losing to Clan na Gael of Armagh), by the late 1960s and early 1970s Gaelic games in Scotland were shrinking and in desperate need of reorganisation. In 1984, publicity and uptake from local men of Irish heritage, especially through the work of Father Eamon Sweeney, led to the formation of the modern Scottish league system, with the first competitive Scottish championship in a generation played at Pearse Park in early 1985 with 4 clubs participating; Pearse Harps and Mulroy Gaels of Glasgow, St Patrick's of Dumbarton, and Clann na Gael of Hamilton. The 1990s saw the growth and resurgence of Scottish Gaelic games. The county teams of Donegal, Derry, Mayo, Dublin, and Sligo all played football matches in Glasgow, while the first British University Ladies' Gaelic Football Championship and British University Hurling Championships were hosted in Scotland in 1997 and 2002 respectively.

The men's county football team lifted the All-Britain Football Championship for the first time in 2014, beating Warwickshire in the final, before contesting an All-Ireland Junior Football Championship semi-final with Cavan. A second All-Britain title came in 2019, with Scotland playing an All-Ireland JFC quarter-final against Kerry. In 2015, the Scotland ladies' county football team reached the All-Ireland Junior Final, beating Derry in the semi-final. The final was played on 27 September 2015, with Scotland coming out second-best against Louth at Croke Park.

Scottish mens' teams have won the All-Britain Club Football Championship on five occasions; Dúnedin Connollys in 2009, 2016, 2017, and 2018, and Glasgow Gaels in 2022. While only one ladies' team has won the All-Britain Ladies' Club Football Championship; Dúnedin Connollys in 2013; they reached the final of the All-Ireland Ladies' Junior Club Football Championship, losing to Na Gaeil of Kerry.

== Football ==
=== Clubs ===
As of 2026, there are two senior men's teams in Scotland, Glasgow Gaels and Dúnedin Connollys, competing in the Scotland Men's Senior Football Championship, and 5 teams competing at Junior level. Sands MacSwineys are not currently playing in the league system, but continue to exist alongside Coatbridge Davitts, who operate a youth section in Coatbridge.

There are 5 teams playing ladies' football at junior level in Scotland, with Coatbridge Davitts and Tír Conaill Harps competing as a joint team. Most of the Scottish teams also operate youth teams at different age groups.

Club name	Teams	Location	Pitch
Dálriada	Men's - Junior Ladies' - Junior	Aberdeen / Dundee	Sheddocksley Football Pitches
Dúnedin Connollys	Men's - Senior / Junior Ladies' - Junior	Edinburgh	Wardie Recreation Ground
Glasgow Gaels	Men's - Senior / Junior Ladies' - Junior	Glasgow	Clydebank Community Sports Hub
Sands MacSwineys / Coatbridge Davitts	Men's - Underage Ladies' - Junior (with Tír Conaill Harps)	Coatbridge	St Ambrose GAA Grounds
Stirling Carrigans	Men's - Junior Ladies' - Junior	Stirling	Stirling County Rugby Club
Tír Conaill Harps	Men's - Junior / Underage Ladies' - Junior (with Coatbridge Davitts)	Cambuslang	Cambuslang Sports Club

=== Scottish Men's Senior Football Championship winners ===
- 1985 Clan Na Gael
- 1986 St Patricks
- 1987 St Patricks
- 1988 Beltane Shamrocks
- 1989 Mulroy Gaels
- 1990 Sands MacSwineys
- 1991 Sands MacSwineys
- 1992 Dálriada
- 1993 Dálriada
- 1994 Dúnedin Connollys
- 1995 Mulroy Gaels
- 1996 St Patricks
- 1997 Mulroy Gaels
- 1998 Mulroy Gaels
- 1999 Sands MacSwineys
- 2000 Mulroy Gaels
- 2001 Tír Conaill Harps
- 2002 Glasgow Gaels
- 2003 Dúnedin Connollys
- 2004 Dúnedin Connollys
- 2005 Dúnedin Connollys
- 2006 Glasgow Gaels
- 2007 Dúnedin Connollys
- 2008 Dúnedin Connollys
- 2009 Dúnedin Connollys
- 2010 Dúnedin Connollys
- 2011 Dúnedin Connollys
- 2012 Tír Conaill Harps
- 2013 Dúnedin Connollys
- 2014 Dúnedin Connollys
- 2015 Dúnedin Connollys
- 2016 Dúnedin Connollys
- 2017 Dúnedin Connollys
- 2018 Dúnedin Connollys
- 2019 Glasgow Gaels
- 2020 not played
- 2021 Dunedin Connollys
- 2022 Glasgow Gaels
- 2023 Glaschu Gaels
- 2024 Dúnedin Connollys
- 2025 Dúnedin Connollys
- 2026 Glasgow Gaels

==== Roll of honour ====
- 18 - Dúnedin Connollys
- 6 - Glasgow Gaels
- 5 - Mulroy Gaels
- 3 - St Patricks, Sands MacSwineys
- 2 - Tír Conaill Harps, Dálriada
- 1 - Clan Na Gael, Beltane Shamrocks

=== County team ===
Scotland fields a men's county team in the All-Britain Football Championship and a ladies' county team in the Britain LGFA Junior Championship. The Scottish men have not won the All-Britain since the tournament was restructured in 2022, and so have not yet competed in the new format of the All-Ireland Junior Football Championship.

== Hurling and camogie ==
=== Clubs ===
Ceann Creige, founded in the Craigend neighbourhood of Glasgow and training in both Ballieston and Clydebank, are the only hurling and camogie team based in Scotland, with teams ranging from minor to senior level. The hurling team compete in the Lancashire Hurling League, Lancashire Hurling Championship and the All Britain Club Hurling Championship, while the camogie team compete in the Northern Division of the Britain Camogie Senior League against Fullen Gaels (Manchester) and the Britain Camogie Senior Championship.

Club name	Teams	Location	Pitch
Ceann Creige	Hurling - Senior Camogie - Senior	Glasgow	Clydebank Community Sports Hub

=== Shinty ===
While traditionally considered a Gaelic game, shinty is organised by the Camanachd Association and not officially associated with Scotland GAA. Ireland and Scotland play each other annually in the Shinty-Hurling International Series, in a hybrid version of hurling and shinty, with the Gaelic Athletic Association responsible for organisation on the Irish side of the event.

== Handball ==
Gaelic handball has a long historical association in Scotland - a game involving striking a ball against a wall with the hand was recorded in Scotland in 1427 during the reign of James I, who reportedly ordered a cellar window in his palace courtyard to be blocked because it interfered with his handball game. This frequently cited as one of the earliest historical references to wall handball.

Efforts to re-establish handball as part of the GAA in Scotland were made in 2025 with a handball open day in Easterhouse, Glasgow; featuring a tournament, coaching and skills challenges; in order to encourage participation and introduce handball to a new generation of players. In 2026, an open tournament was held at Broughton High School in Edinburgh, attracting players ranging in age from 6 to 67, and competitions including a men's open, men's B and C grades, women's open and an over-60s competition. Willie Quaile won the men's open title, while Aoibheann Muldoon-McGurk won the women's open and men's B competitions. The emergence of organised handball events has provided Scotland GAA with a further means of involving new players in Gaelic games, with its small playing area, limited equipment requirements and suitability for both indoor and outdoor play identified as potential advantages for developing the sport in Scotland.
