= Lancashire Senior Hurling Championship =

Hurling tournament in Lancashire, England

- Irish: Craobh Sinsir Iomáint Lancasír
- Code: Hurling
- Founded: 2014 (current state)
- Region: Lancashire (GAA)
- No. of teams: 5
- Title holders: Fullen Gaels (10th title)
- Most titles: Fullen Gaels (10 titles)
- Sponsors: Camida

The Lancashire Senior Hurling Championship is the top-level hurling championship in Lancashire, England, and is the responsibility of the Lancashire county board. As of 2026, five teams compete in the county championship.

== Teams ==
Club		Location	Pitch
English	Irish	Location	Pitch
Fullen Gaels	Gael Fullen	Manchester	Hough End Playing Fields
Warrington Hurling	Na Mic Tíre	Warrington	Appleton Thorn Playing Fields
Liverpool Wolfe Tones	Uilf Tóin Learpholl	Liverpool	Wavertree Sports Park
Ceann Creige†	Ceann Creige	Glasgow	Clydebank CSH
Yorkshire Emeralds†	Smaragaidí Sír-Eabhrac	Leeds	Beeston Park

†Denotes team based outside of Lancashire, but competes in the county championship due to lack of opponents locally.

== List of finals ==
Year	Winner	Score		Runner-up	Venue	Source
2026	Fullen Gaels	8-17	2-12	Yorkshire Emeralds	Lancashire Centre of Excellence	
2025	Ceann Creige	4-21	1-11	Yorkshire Emeralds	Old Bedians	
2024	Fullen Gaels	4-15	0-23	Liverpool Wolfe Tones	Old Bedians	
2023	Ceann Creige	3-14	1-13	Liverpool Wolfe Tones	Old Bedians	
2022	Fullen Gaels	1-17	1-13	Ceann Creige	Old Bedians	
2021	Fullen Gaels	3-24	1-13	Liverpool Wolfe Tones	Wavertree Sports Park	
2020	Fullen Gaels	2-17	0-07	Liverpool Wolfe Tones	Hough End Playing Fields	
2019	Fullen Gaels	w/o	scr.	Liverpool Wolfe Tones		
2018	Fullen Gaels	2-21	1-09	Liverpool Wolfe Tones	Old Bedians	
2017	Fullen Gaels	2-17	1-11	Liverpool Wolfe Tones	Hough End Playing Fields	
2016	Fullen Gaels	4-11	1-15	Liverpool Wolfe Tones	Old Bedians	
2015	Liverpool Wolfe Tones	3-15	0-09	Yorkshire Emeralds	Hough End Playing Fields	
2014	Fullen Gaels	1-18	0-14	Liverpool Wolfe Tones	Hough End Playing Fields	

== Roll of honour ==
- 2014 Fullen Gaels
- 2015 Liverpool Wolfe Tones
- 2016 Fullen Gaels
- 2017 Fullen Gaels
- 2018 Fullen Gaels
- 2019 Fullen Gaels
- 2020 Fullen Gaels
- 2021 Fullen Gaels
- 2022 Fullen Gaels
- 2023 Ceann Creige
- 2024 Fullen Gaels
- 2025 Ceann Creige
- 2026 Fullen Gaels

=== Wins by team ===
Club	SHC wins
Fullen Gaels	10
Ceann Creige	2
Liverpool Wolfe Tones	1
Yorkshire Emeralds	0
Warrington Hurling	0
