= Warwickshire GAA =

Gaelic games governing body in England

- Irish: Contae Warwick
- Founded: 1941; 85 years ago
- Province: Britain
- Ground(s): Páirc na hÉireann, Solihull
- County colours: Black White

County teams
- NHL: Division 4
- Football Championship: All-Ireland Junior Football Championship
- Hurling Championship: Lory Meagher Cup

County colours

The Warwickshire County Board of the Gaelic Athletic Association (GAA), also known as CLG Contae Warwick or Warwickshire GAA, is one of the county boards of the GAA outside Ireland, and is responsible for Gaelic games in the Midlands. The county board is also responsible for the Warwickshire county teams. With Gloucestershire, Hertfordshire, Lancashire, London, Scotland and Yorkshire, the board makes up the British Provincial Board.

== History ==
While it is unclear when organised Gaelic games began in the Midlands, there is evidence of hurling being played in Birmingham since 1907, with 'Erin's Hope' arranging games against teams from Liverpool, Manchester and London. In 1935, the British Provincial Council arranged a meeting with the intention of forming a county board. A committee was established and some progress was made before the outbreak of the Second World War made it difficult to continue.

Due to efforts of the John Mitchel's Hurling Club, and in response to a request from the Lancashire County Board, the Warwickshire County Board was formed in 1941. Clubs began to pop up across the West Midlands, including in Birmingham with Robert Emmets, St. Patricks, Tara, St Pauls, St Chads, Emerald Isles, The Sacred Heart, J F Kennedys, Sean McDermotts and Erin go Bragh; in Coventry with Shannon Rovers, Banba Rovers, Four Masters, St Finbarrs and Roger Casements; as well as St Peters in Leamington Spa and St Marys in Wolverhampton. The first juvenile hurling game was played in Birmingham in 1958, and by 1959 there were 40 teams playing hurling and football in Warwickshire.

Between 1946 and 1990 the Warwickshire inter-county teams reached 18 All-Ireland junior finals, divided equally amongst both Gaelic football and hurling. All-Ireland JHC titles were won in 1968, 1969 and 1973. There was also a defeat by Antrim in the 1970 All-Ireland IHC final.

While games were originally played across the county area, most notably at Glebe Farm Recreation Ground in Kitts Green, Birmingham, an official base for Warwickshire GAA was established with the construction of Páirc na hÉireann in Solihull.

In 1994, the Ladies’ County Board was formed in Warwickshire, consisting of three teams: St Brendans in Kings Heath, and two teams in Erdington- St Chads and Erin go Bragh. More teams followed throughout the 1990s, and by 2000 the Board had 7 affiliated ladies’ football clubs; St Brendans, Erin go Bragh, John Mitchels (Kings Norton), Sean McDermotts (Small Heath), Young Irelands (Leicester), Roger Casements (Coventry; originally formed as Clann Na H'eireann) and Emerald Gaels (Manchester; officially in the Lancashire boundaries but competing in Warwickshire competitions). Warwickshire ladies’ also began to compete in county football, winning their first Britain LGFA Junior Championship in 1998.

A restructuring of the entire Irish hurling championship system in 2005 resulted in Warwickshire fielding a team in the third tier Nicky Rackard Cup. The team later dropped down to the fourth tier and won two Lory Meagher Cup titles in 2013 and 2017.

== Football ==
=== Clubs ===
Club name		Teams	Location	Pitch
English	Irish	Teams	Location	Pitch
Erin go Bragh	Erin go Bragh	Men's - Senior / Junior Ladies' - Junior	Birmingham	Holly Lane Sports Club
Four Masters	Ceithre Máistreacht	Men's - Intermediate	Coventry	Finham Park School
John Mitchels	Séan Mistéal	Men's - Senior / Junior Ladies' - Junior	Birmingham	Box Trees Road
Naomh Padraig	Naomh Padraig	Men's - Intermediate	Leicester	The Emerald Centre
Roger Casements	Ruairí Mac Easmainn	Men's - Senior / Junior Ladies' - Junior	Coventry	Coventry Sphinx Sports Club
Rugby Gaels	Rugby Gaels	Men's - Intermediate	Rugby	Newbold RFC
Sean McDermotts	Seán Mac Diarmada	Men's - Senior / Junior Ladies' - Junior	Birmingham	Old Damson Lane
Sons of Erin	Clann Erin	Men's - Intermediate	Northampton	The Racecourse Park
St Barnabas	Barnaib Naofa	Men's - Intermediate Ladies' - Junior	Nottingham	Victoria Embankment
St Brendans	Naomh Breandàin	Men's - Senior / Junior	Birmingham	The New Irish Centre
St Finbarrs	Naomh Fionnbarra	Men's - Intermediate Ladies' - Junior	Coventry	St Finbarrs Sports Club
St Josephs	Naomh Seosamh	Men's - Intermediate	Derby	Duffield Road
St Marys	Naomh Mhuire	Men's - Intermediate Ladies' - Junior	Wolverhampton	Aldersley High School

=== Warwickshire Men's Senior Football Championship winners ===
- 1938 St Patricks
- 1939 Granuaile
- 1940
- 1941
- 1942 St Thomas More
- 1943 Granuaile
- 1944 St Thomas More
- 1945
- 1946
- 1947
- 1948
- 1949
- 1950 Taras
- 1951 John Mitchels
- 1952 Shannon Rangers
- 1953 Shannon Rangers
- 1954 Shannon Rangers
- 1955 Taras
- 1956 St Pauls
- 1957
- 1958 St Pauls
- 1959 Shamrocks
- 1960 St Pauls
- 1961 Taras
- 1962 John Mitchels
- 1963 St Finbarrs
- 1964 John Mitchels
- 1965 St Finbarrs
- 1966 John Mitchels
- 1967 John Mitchels
- 1968 St Pauls
- 1969 John Mitchels
- 1970 Sean McDermotts
- 1971 Sean McDermotts
- 1972 Sean McDermotts
- 1973 Sean McDermotts
- 1974 Sean McDermotts
- 1975 Sean McDermotts
- 1976 Sean McDermotts
- 1977 St Brendans
- 1978 Roger Casements
- 1979 Sean McDermotts
- 1980 St Edwards / St Chads / Erin go Bragh
- 1981 Sean McDermotts
- 1982 Sean McDermotts
- 1983 St Brendans
- 1984 Sons of Erin / O’Rahillys
- 1985 St Brendans
- 1986 St Brendans
- 1987 Erin go Bragh
- 1988 John Mitchels
- 1989 St Barnabas
- 1990 Erin go Bragh
- 1991 John Mitchels
- 1992 St Brendans
- 1993 St Brendans
- 1994 Erin go Bragh
- 1995 Sean McDermotts
- 1996 St Brendans
- 1997 Sean McDermotts
- 1998 Sean McDermotts
- 1999 Sean McDermotts
- 2000 Sean McDermotts
- 2001 Sean McDermotts
- 2002 Sean McDermotts
- 2003 Sean McDermotts
- 2004 Roger Casements
- 2005 Roger Casements
- 2006 Sean McDermotts
- 2007 Sean McDermotts
- 2008 Sean McDermotts
- 2009 Sean McDermotts
- 2010 Sean McDermotts
- 2011 St Barnabas
- 2012 Sean McDermotts
- 2013 John Mitchels
- 2014 Sean McDermotts
- 2015 Sean McDermotts
- 2016 Sean McDermotts
- 2017 Sean McDermotts
- 2018 Sean McDermotts
- 2019 Sean McDermotts
- 2020 Sean McDermotts
- 2021 Sean McDermotts
- 2022 Roger Casements
- 2023 Sean McDermotts
- 2024 Roger Casements
- 2025 Sean McDermotts
- 2026 Sean McDermotts

==== Roll of honour ====
- 35 - Sean McDermotts
- 9 - John Mitchels
- 7 - St Brendans
- 5 - Roger Casements
- 4 - St Pauls, Erin go Bragh
- 3 - Taras, Shannon Rangers
- 2 - Granuaile, St Thomas More, St Finbarrs, St Barnabas
- 1 - St Patricks, Shamrocks, St Chads, St Edwards, O'Rahillys, Sons of Erin

=== Warwickshire Ladies' Football Championship winners ===
- 1994 Erin go Bragh
- 1995 John Mitchels
- 1996 Erin go Bragh
- 1997 Erin go Bragh
- 1998 Erin go Bragh
- 1999 John Mitchels
- 2000 John Mitchels
- 2001
- 2002
- 2003
- 2004 Roger Casements
- 2005 John Mitchels
- 2006 John Mitchels
- 2007
- 2008 Roger Casements
- 2009
- 2010
- 2011
- 2012 St Barnabas
- 2013 John Mitchels
- 2014 Roger Casements
- 2015 St Barnabas
- 2016 John Mitchels
- 2017 Roger Casements
- 2018 Roger Casements
- 2019 John Mitchels
- 2020 John Mitchels
- 2021 John Mitchels
- 2022 John Mitchels
- 2023 St Barnabas
- 2024 Roger Casements
- 2025 Sean McDermotts
- 2026 Roger Casements

==== Roll of honour ====
- 11 - John Mitchels
- 7 - Roger Casements
- 4 - Erin go Bragh
- 3 - St Barnabas
- 1 - Sean McDermotts

=== County team ===
Warwickshire fields a men's county team in the All-Britain Junior Football Championship and a ladies' county team in the Britain LGFA Junior Championship. The Warwickshire men have also competed in the new format of the All-Ireland Junior Football Championship.

==== Honours ====
- Men's
  - All-Ireland Junior Football Championship
    - (silver) Runners-Up (9): 1946, 1951, 1955, 1957, 1984, 1985, 1987, 1989, 1990
  - All-Britain Junior Football Championship
    - (gold) Winners (16): 1976, 1978, 1979, 1980, 1984, 1985, 1987, 1989, 1990, 1997, 1998, 1999, 2003, 2006, 2021, 2023
    - (silver) Runners-Up (9): 2008, 2011, 2014, 2017, 2018, 2019, 2022, 2024, 2025

== Hurling and camogie ==
=== Clubs ===
Club name		Teams	Location
English	Irish	Teams	Location
Erin go Bragh	Erin go Bragh	Hurling - Senior Camogie - Intermediate	Birmingham
John Mitchels	Séan Mistéal	Hurling - Senior Camogie - Intermediate	Birmingham
St Barnabas	Barnaib Naofa	Hurling - Senior	Nottingham
St Finbarrs	Naomh Fionnbarra	Hurling - Senior	Coventry

=== Warwickshire Senior Hurling Championship winners ===
- 1938 Éire Óg
- 1939 Éire Óg
- 1940
- 1941 Granuaile
- 1942 Granuaile
- 1943 Granuaile
- 1944 Granuaile
- 1945
- 1946
- 1947 Erin’s Hope
- 1948
- 1949
- 1950 John Mitchel’s
- 1951 Emerald Isle
- 1952 Shannon Rangers
- 1953 John Mitchel’s
- 1954 Emerald Isle
- 1955 St. Finbarr’s
- 1956 St. Finbarr’s
- 1957 St. Finbarr’s
- 1958 Croke’s
- 1959 Croke’s
- 1960 St. Chad’s
- 1961 St. Finbarr’s
- 1962 Fr. Murphy’s
- 1963 St. Chad’s
- 1964 St. Finbarr’s
- 1965 St. Finbarr’s
- 1966 St. Finbarr’s
- 1967 St. Finbarr’s
- 1968 St. Chad’s
- 1969 St. Finbarr’s
- 1970 John Mitchel’s
- 1971 Sean McDermott’s
- 1972 Sean McDermott’s
- 1973 St. Finbarr’s
- 1974 John Mitchel’s
- 1975 John Mitchel’s
- 1976 Sean McDermott’s
- 1977 Sean McDermott’s
- 1978 Sean McDermott’s
- 1979 Sean McDermott’s
- 1980 St. Finbarr’s
- 1981 Sean McDermott’s
- 1982 Sean McDermott’s
- 1983 Sean McDermott’s
- 1984 Sean McDermott’s
- 1985 Sean McDermott’s
- 1986 Sean McDermott’s
- 1987 Sean McDermott’s
- 1988 St. Finbarr’s
- 1989 Sean McDermott’s
- 1990 Sean McDermott’s
- 1991 John Mitchel’s
- 1992 John Mitchel’s
- 1993 John Mitchel’s
- 1994 Sean McDermott’s
- 1995 Sean McDermott’s
- 1996 Sean McDermott’s
- 1997 Sean McDermott’s
- 1998 Sean McDermott’s
- 1999 John Mitchel’s
- 2000 John Mitchel’s
- 2001 John Mitchel’s
- 2002 John Mitchel’s
- 2003 John Mitchel’s
- 2004 John Mitchel’s
- 2005 John Mitchel’s
- 2006 Erin go Bragh
- 2007 John Mitchel’s
- 2008 John Mitchel’s
- 2009 John Mitchel’s
- 2010 Fullen Gaels
- 2011 Fullen Gaels
- 2012 Fullen Gaels
- 2013 Fullen Gaels
- 2014 John Mitchel’s
- 2015 John Mitchel’s
- 2016 John Mitchel’s
- 2017 John Mitchel’s
- 2018 John Mitchel’s
- 2019 John Mitchel’s
- 2020 John Mitchel’s
- 2021 St. Finbarr’s
- 2022 John Mitchel’s
- 2023 St. Finbarr’s
- 2024 St. Finbarr's
- 2025 John Mitchel's
- 2026 John Mitchel's

==== Roll of honour ====
- 33 - John Mitchel's
- 22 - Sean McDermott's
- 15 - St. Finbarr's
- 4 - Granuaile, Fullen Gaels†
- 3 - St. Chad's
- 2 - Éire Óg, Emerald Isle, Croke's
- 1 - Shannon Rangers, Fr. Murphy's, Erin go Bragh

†Fullen Gaels competed in the Warwickshire Senior Hurling competition until 2014, due to lack of opponents in the area.

=== County team ===
Warwickshire hurlers (in black) in action against Leitrim in 2024

The Warwickshire men's hurling team compete in the Lory Meagher Cup, the fifth tier of the All-Ireland Senior Hurling Championship, and Division 4 of the National Hurling League.

==== Honours ====
- Nicky Rackard Cup
  - (silver) Runners-Up: 2018
- Lory Meagher Cup:
  - (gold) Winners (3): 2013, 2017
- All-Ireland Intermediate Hurling Championship:
  - (silver) Runners-Up: 1970
- All-Ireland Junior Hurling Championship:
  - (gold) Winners (3): 1968, 1969, 1973
  - (silver) Runners-Up (6): 1953, 1955, 1958, 1965, 1966, 1972
- National Hurling League Division 3A:
  - (gold) Winners: 2018
- National Hurling League Division 3B:
  - (gold) Winners (2): 2015, 2024

== Notable players ==
- Liam Watson: Lory Meagher Cup-winner (2017)
