= Kerry GAA honours =

Championships and individual awards

Kerry are by far the most successful team in the history of Gaelic football. They have won 39 All-Ireland Senior Football Championship and have appeared in countless other All-Ireland Football Finals. Kerry footballers have been garlanded with countless awards and hold numerous individual records in the sport. Pat Spillane received nine All Stars during a glittering career, a feat matched by no other Gaelic footballer, while Tadhg Kennelly was the first holder of both an AFL Premiership medallion and a Senior All-Ireland Championship medal, the highest possible achievement in the sports of Australian rules football and Gaelic football.

== Gaelic football ==
All Irelands (95)

- All-Ireland Senior Football Championships: 39
  - 1903, 1904, 1909, 1913, 1914, 1924, 1926, 1929, 1930, 1931, 1932, 1937, 1939, 1940, 1941, 1946, 1953, 1955, 1959, 1962, 1969, 1970, 1975, 1978, 1979, 1980, 1981, 1984, 1985, 1986, 1997, 2000, 2004, 2006, 2007, 2009, 2014, 2022, 2025
- All-Ireland Under-21 Football Championships: 11
  - 1964, 1973, 1975, 1976, 1977, 1990, 1995, 1996, 1998, 2008, 2026
- All-Ireland Minor Football Championships: 16
  - 1931, 1932, 1933, 1946, 1950, 1962, 1963, 1975, 1980, 1988, 1994, 2014, 2015, 2016, 2017, 2018
- All-Ireland Junior Football Championships: 20
  - 1913, 1915, 1924, 1928, 1930, 1941, 1949, 1954, 1963, 1967, 1983, 1991, 1994, 2006, 2012, 2015, 2016, 2017, 2018, 2019
- All-Ireland Vocational Schools Championships: 9
  - 1973, 1977, 1978, 1986, 1987, 1990, 1992, 1993, 1997

League Titles (25)

- National Football Leagues: 24
  - 1928, 1929, 1931, 1932, 1959, 1961, 1963, 1969, 1971, 1972, 1973, 1974, 1977, 1982, 1984, 1997, 2004, 2006, 2009, 2017, 2020, 2021, 2022, 2025
- National Football Leagues Div 2: 1
  - 2002

=== Regional ===
Provincials (228)

- Munster Senior Football Championships: 87
  - 1892, 1903, 1904, 1905, 1908, 1909, 1910, 1912, 1913, 1914, 1915, 1919, 1923, 1924, 1925, 1926, 1927, 1929, 1930, 1931, 1932, 1933, 1934, 1936, 1937, 1938, 1939, 1940, 1941, 1942, 1944, 1946, 1947, 1948, 1950, 1951, 1953, 1954, 1955, 1958, 1959, 1960, 1961, 1962, 1963, 1964, 1965, 1968, 1969, 1970, 1972, 1975, 1976, 1977, 1978, 1979, 1980, 1981, 1982, 1984, 1985, 1986, 1991, 1996, 1997, 1998, 2000, 2001, 2003, 2004, 2005, 2007, 2010, 2011, 2013, 2014, 2015, 2016, 2017, 2018, 2019, 2021, 2022, 2023, 2024, 2025, 2026
- Munster Under-21/Under-20 Football Championships: 33 (Under 20 since 2018)
  - 1962, 1964, 1966, 1967, 1968, 1972, 1973, 1975, 1976, 1977, 1978, 1983, 1987, 1988, 1990, 1991, 1992, 1993, 1995, 1996, 1997, 1998, 1999, 2002, 2008, 2017, 2018, 2020, 2022, 2023, 2024, 2025, 2026
- Munster Minor Football Championships: 52
  - 1931, 1932, 1933, 1936, 1937, 1938, 1940, 1941, 1945, 1946, 1947, 1948, 1949, 1950, 1951, 1954, 1957, 1958, 1962, 1963, 1965, 1970, 1975, 1978, 1979, 1980, 1982, 1988, 1989, 1990, 1994, 1996, 1997, 1998, 2001, 2002, 2003, 2004, 2006, 2008, 2009, 2013, 2014, 2015, 2016, 2017, 2018, 2019, 2020, 2023, 2024, 2025
- Munster Junior Football Championships: 46
  - 1913, 1914, 1915, 1924, 1926, 1927, 1928, 1930, 1931, 1934, 1936, 1938, 1941, 1946, 1947, 1949, 1954, 1956, 1958, 1959, 1960, 1961, 1963, 1965, 1967, 1968, 1969, 1983, 1985, 1991, 1994, 1995, 1997, 2000, 2002, 2003, 2006, 2008, 2010, 2012, 2014, 2015, 2016, 2017, 2018, 2019
- Munster Football League: 1
  - 1926
- McGrath Cup: 6
  - 1996, 2010, 2011, 2013, 2017, 2022
- Dr Croke Cup: 1
  - 1906
- Croke Memorial Tournament: 1
  - 1913
- Railway Cup Football: 2
  - 1927 (all Kerry players), 1931 (all Kerry players)

(Note that the Railway Cup is contested by provincial sides - these are years in which the Munster team consisted entirely of Kerry players).

== Individual ==
=== Players who won eight All-Ireland SFC medals (5) ===
- Pat Spillane
- Mikey Sheehy
- Páidí Ó Sé
- Denis "Ogie" Moran
- Ger Power

=== GAA/GPA Footballer of the Year wins (10) ===
The following Kerry Players were named GAA/GPA Footballer of the Year:

1997: Maurice Fitzgerald
2000: Seamus Moynihan
2004: Tomás Ó Sé
2006: Kieran Donaghy
2007: Marc Ó Sé
2009: Paul Galvin
2014: James O'Donoghue
2022: David Clifford
2023: David Clifford^{2nd}
2025: David Clifford^{3rd}

=== Texaco Footballer of the Year wins (18) ===
The following Kerry players were named Texaco Footballer of the Year:

1959: Seán Murphy
1962: Mick O'Connell
1969: Mick O'Dwyer
1979: Tom Prendergast
1975: John O'Keeffe
1978: Pat Spillane
1979: Mikey Sheehy
1980: Jack O'Shea
1981: Jack O'Shea^{2nd}
1984: Jack O'Shea^{3rd}
1985: Jack O'Shea^{4th}
1986: Pat Spillane^{2nd}
1997: Maurice Fitzgerald
2000: Seamus Moynihan
2004: Colm Cooper
2006: Kieran Donaghy
2007: Marc Ó Sé
2009: Tomás Ó Sé

=== Team of the Millennium (6) ===
The following Kerry players were among the fifteen selected for the Football Team of the Millennium:

- Dan O'Keeffe (goalkeeper)
- Joe Keohane (full-back)
- Seán Murphy (right half-back)
- Mick O'Connell (midfielder)
- Pat Spillane (left half-forward)
- Mikey Sheehy (right corner-forward)

=== Team of the Century (6) ===
The following Kerry players were among the fifteen selected for the Football Team of the Century in 1984:

- Dan O'Keeffe (goalkeeper)
- Seán Murphy (right half-back)
- Jack O'Shea (midfielder)
- Mick O'Connell (midfielder)
- Pat Spillane (left half-forward)
- Mikey Sheehy (right corner-forward)

== Ladies' football ==
- All-Ireland Senior Ladies' Football Championships: 12
  - 1976, 1982, 1983, 1984, 1985, 1986, 1987, 1988, 1989, 1990, 1993, 2024
- All-Ireland Under-18 Ladies' Football Championship: 3
  - 1980, 1981, 1995
- All-Ireland Under-16 Ladies' Football Championship: 5
  - 1999, 2010, 2015, 2016, 2025
- All-Ireland Under-14 Ladies' Football Championship: 7
  - 1991, 1992, 1993, 1999, 2008, 2014, 2022

== Hurling ==
- All-Ireland Senior Hurling Championships: 1
  - 1891
- All-Ireland Senior B Hurling Championships: 3
  - 1976, 1983, 1986
- Christy Ring Cup: 2
  - 2011, 2015
- All-Ireland Under 21 B Hurling Championships: 9
  - 2001, 2002, 2006, 2009, 2010, 2011, 2013, 2017, 2018, 2019
- All Ireland Minor B Hurling Championships: 10
  - 1997, 2000, 2001, 2006, 2009, 2012, 2013, 2014, 2015, 2016
- All-Ireland Junior Hurling Championship: 2
  - 1961, 1972
- National Hurling Leagues Division 2: 7
  - 1957, 1962, 1967, 1968, 1979, 1998, 2001
- National Hurling Leagues Division 2A: 2
  - 2014, 2015
- National Hurling Leagues Division 3: 1
  - 1989
- National Hurling Leagues Division 3A: 1
  - 2010
- Munster Senior Hurling Championships: 1
  - 1891
- Munster Junior Hurling Championships: 1
  - 1956
- Munster Intermediate Hurling Championships: 2
  - 1970, 1973
- Leinster Minor B Hurling Championships: 2
  - 1987, 1988

Notable hurlers

Michael ‘Boxer’ Slattery Shane Brick Brendan O'Sullivan John Mike Dooley John Healy John Mahony Tom Collins Maurice Leahy Christy Walsh

== Camogie ==
A selected Kerry team won divisional honours at Féile na nGael in 2008, 2009 and 2010. Notable players include Mary Geaney.

== Other ==
Other notable achievements include:

- Pat Spillane, recipient of nine All Stars during a glittering career, a feat matched by no other Gaelic footballer.
- Jack O'Shea, recipient of four Texaco Footballer of the Year awards, a feat matched by no other Gaelic footballer.
- David Clifford, recipient of three GAA/GPA Footballer of the Year awards, a feat matched by no other Gaelic footballer.
- Tadhg Kennelly, the first holder of both an AFL Premiership medallion and a Senior All-Ireland Championship medal, the highest possible achievement in the sports of Australian rules football and Gaelic football.
