= 1961 All-Ireland Junior Hurling Championship =

1961 inter-county junior hurling championship

All Ireland Champions
- Winners: Kerry (1st win)
- Captain: Mick Hennessy

All Ireland Runners-up
- Runners-up: London

Provincial Champions
- Munster: Not Played
- Leinster: Meath
- Ulster: Antrim
- Connacht: Roscommon

The 1961 All-Ireland Junior Hurling Championship was the 40th staging of the All-Ireland Junior Championship since its establishment by the Gaelic Athletic Association in 1912.

London entered the championship as the defending champions.

The All-Ireland final was played on 1 October 1961 at Austin Stack Park in Tralee, between Kerry and London, in what was their first meeting in the final. Kerry won the match by 4-14 to 2-05 to claim their first championship title.

== All-Ireland Junior Hurling Championship ==
=== All-Ireland semi-finals ===
13 August 1961 Semi-final	Antrim	1-05 - 2-10	Kerry	Casement Park
	D Coyle 1-1, L Hamill 0-2, A Forsythe 0-1, S Wright 0-1.		E O'Sullivan 1-1, M Hennessy 0-4, J Culloty 0-4, S Lovett 1-0, J Barry 0-1.

27 August 1961 Semi-final	Meath	3-05 - 3-03	Roscommon	St. Loman's Park
	J Curtis 1-1, M Garry 1-0, C Hilliard 1-0, C Cunningham 0-2, P Christie 0-1, TJ Geraghty 0-1.		M Hoare 1-0, G O'Malley 1-0, M Kelly 1-0, B Boyle 0-2, J Walton 0-1.

=== All-Ireland home final ===
12 September 1961 Home final	Kerry	4-09 - 5-02	Meath	Croke Park
	J Culloty 2-1, T Hennessy 0-4, J Barry 1-0, A Murphy 1-0, B McCarthy 0-2, E O'Sullivan 0-1, B Lawlor 0-1.		B Cannon 2-1, S Collier 1-0, N Smith 1-0, S Giles 1-0, P McCabe 0-1.

=== All-Ireland final ===
1 October 1961 Final	Kerry	4-14 - 2-05	London	Austin Stack Park
	B McCarthy 2-0, T Hennessy 1-3, E O'Sullivan 1-2, S Healy 0-5, J Culloty 0-2, J Barry 0-1, P Sullivan 0-1.		C Hickey 1-3, S Somers 1-0, T Delaney 0-1, P Dwyer 0-1.
