= 1968 All-Ireland Junior Hurling Championship =

1968 inter-county junior hurling championship

All Ireland Champions
- Winners: Warwickshire (1st win)

All Ireland Runners-up
- Runners-up: Kerry
- Captain: Bill McCarthy

Provincial Champions
- Munster: Not Played
- Leinster: Louth
- Ulster: Antrim
- Connacht: Sligo

The 1968 All-Ireland Junior Hurling Championship was the 47th staging of the All-Ireland Junior Championship since its establishment by the Gaelic Athletic Association in 1912.

Wicklow were the defending champions.

The All-Ireland final was played on 6 October 1968 at Glebe Park in Birmingham, between Warwickshire and Kerry, in what was their first ever meeting in the final. Warwickshire won the match by 1–14 to 1–09 to claim their first ever All-Ireland title.

== All-Ireland Junior Hurling Championship ==
=== All-Ireland semi-finals ===
25 August 1968 Semi-final	Kerry	4-08 - 3-06	Antrim	Austin Stack Park
	P O'Sullivan 2-0, B McCarthy 1-3, J O'Sullivan 1-1, B Lawlor 0-2, C Flaherty 0-2.		M McKerney 2-1, S Shannon 1-0, A Hamill 0-3, S McMullan 0-2.

25 August 1968 Semi-final	Sligo	3-09 - 2-08	Louth	Markievicz Park
	C O'Neill 1-2, W Murphy 1-2, T McMorrow 1-0, T Flannery 0-2, T Hayden 0-1, M Burke 0-1.		P O'Brien 2-2, J Lane 0-3, D Murray 0-2, F Cooney 0-1.

=== All-Ireland home final ===
8 September 1968 Home final	Kerry	6-09 - 5-09	Sligo	Ballinasloe Grounds
	B McCarthy 2-5, J Conlon 2-0, B Twomey 1-1, J O'Sullivan 1-1, C Flaherty 0-1, T O'Sullivan 0-1.		T McNamara 2-4, T Flannery 2-0, S Armstrong 1-0, W Murphy 0-3, J McDonagh 0-1, N Rooney 0-1.

=== All-Ireland final ===
6 October 1968 Final	Warwickshire	1-14 - 1-09	Kerry	Glebe Park
	C Crowe 0-12, C Danaher 1-0, W Hogan 0-1, D Dunne 0-1.		N Power 1-0, C Flaherty 0-3, P O'Sullivan 0-2, B Twomey 0-2, C O'Sullivan 0-1, B McCarthy 0-1.
