= Oisín GAA Manchester =

Gaelic football club in Manchester, England

Oisín GAA
- CLG Oisín
- Founded: 1904
- County: Lancashire
- Nickname: Oisín
- Colours: Blue and white
- Grounds: Old Bedians, Didsbury

Playing kits
Standard colours

Oisín Gaelic Athletic Club (Irish: Cumann Lúthchleas Gael Oisín) is a Gaelic football club in East Didsbury, Manchester.

Oisín play football at men's senior, men's junior, and ladies' junior level, as well as having a growing under-age structure. They are one of the member clubs of the Lancashire County Board.

== History ==
CLG Oisín was formed in 1904 out of the Craobh Oisín Gaelic League Club, based in Gaythorn, Manchester. The Gaelic League club was involved in promoting Irish music, song, and dance at that time, and the formation of a Gaelic football club was an extension to their activities.

When the Gaelic League club ceased to exist in 1954, Oisín were left without an official headquarters. In 1992, the club joined efforts by Old Bedians RUFC and Bedians AFC to repair their clubhouse, which had been destroyed by fire, and Old Bedians became the club's new home.

In 2004, the club celebrated its centenary year and published a book on its history, entitled "An Scéal". A copy of the book is on display in the GAA Museum in Croke Park.

The club's current underage system was established in 2006.

== Honours ==
=== Men's football ===
- All-Britain Club Football Championship (1)
  - 1994
- All Britain Canon Stritch Cup (1)
  - 2001
- Lancashire Senior Football Championship (16)
  - 1951, 1953, 1957, 1959, 1969, 1976, 1977, 1981, 1982, 1994, 2002, 2006, 2017, 2018, 2019, 2020
- Lancashire Senior Football League (8)
  - 1949, 1951, 1969, 1986, 1994, 1995, 2001, 2014, 2019
- Lancashire Junior Football Championship (7)
  - 1990, 1991, 1994, 2003, 2013, 2014, 2015, 2017, 2019
- Lancashire Junior Football League (7)
  - 1982, 1987, 1991, 1994, 1998, 2001, 2003
- Wolfe Tone Cup (6)
  - 1982, 1987, 1993, 2001, 2004, 2008

=== Ladies' football ===
- All-Britain Junior Ladies' Club Football Championship (3)
  - 2010, 2015, 2019
- Lancashire Junior Ladies' Football Championship (4)
  - 2010, 2015, 2019, 2021

== Notable players ==
=== Former inter-county players ===
- Bob Harrison (Kildare)
- Eamon Boland (Roscommon)
- Eddie Hogan (Kildare)
- Emmett Fullen (Derry)
- Kevin McNamee (Meath)
- Moss O'Connell - (Kerry)
- P.J. McGowan (Donegal)

=== Other notable players ===
- Pádraig Johnson - Britain GAA President between 1994 and 1996
- Peter Quinn - GAA President between 1991 and 1994
- Noel Gallagher and Liam Gallagher - Oasis band members
