= Wavertree Sports Park =

Sporting, exercise and leisure complex in Liverpool, UK

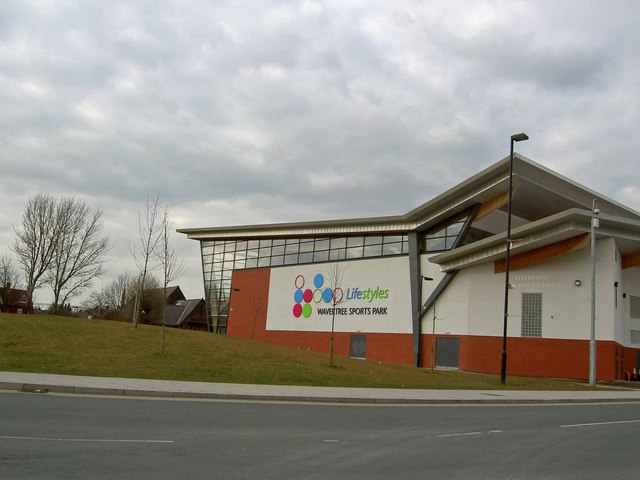
- Interactive map of Wavertree Sports Park
- Location: Wavertree, Liverpool, England
- Coordinates: 53.397°N 2.925°W
- Owner: Liverpool City Council
- Operator: Lifestyles

Wavertree Sports Park is a large sporting, exercise and leisure complex located in the Wavertree area of Liverpool, England. The sports park is home to the Liverpool Aquatics Centre, Liverpool Tennis Centre and Wavertree Athletics Centre alongside numerous other health and fitness related facilities.

== Liverpool Tennis Centre ==
Liverpool Tennis Centre has six indoor acrylic tennis courts and six outdoor macadam tennis courts, four of which are floodlit. The venue was built with funding from the Lawn Tennis Association, Sport England and Liverpool City Council. It has hosted major tennis competitions, including the Liverpool International Tennis Tournament in 2003 and the Nike Junior International in 2013 and 2014. Until recently, the centre was closed to the public during the day but is now open from 9.00am every day for coaching and pay-and-play customers.

== Liverpool Aquatics Centre ==
The Liverpool Aquatic Centre is a £17million development. It opened on 15 March 2008. The development has two swimming pools, one Olympic standard 8-lane 50 metre pool and a smaller four lane 20m pool. It cost £2.1million to maintain in 2008. To fund the build, £13m was borrowed by Liverpool City Council. The final bill will be £31m, once the debt is repaid in 2008, at a cost of £1.3m a year.

== Wavertree Athletics Centre ==
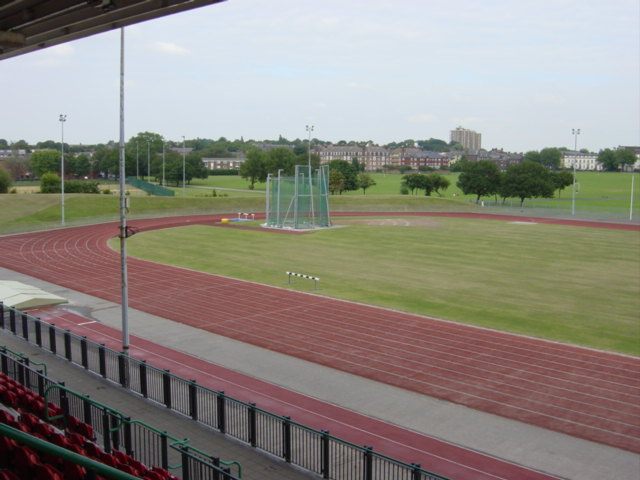
Exterior athletics track

The Wavertree Athletics Centre was a training facility for the 2012 Summer Olympics. The capacity of the athletics stadium is 480. There is an outdoor 8 lane 400 metres synthetic running track and an interior 4-lane 60 metre track. It is home to Liverpool Harriers and Athletic Club. The stadium hosted the first ever baseball World Cup game in 1938.

== Other facilities ==
The sports park is home to a Gaelic games pitch, used predominantly by Liverpool Wolfe Tones GAA, as well as the local university Gaelic football teams.
