= Old Bedians =

Sports venue in East Didsbury

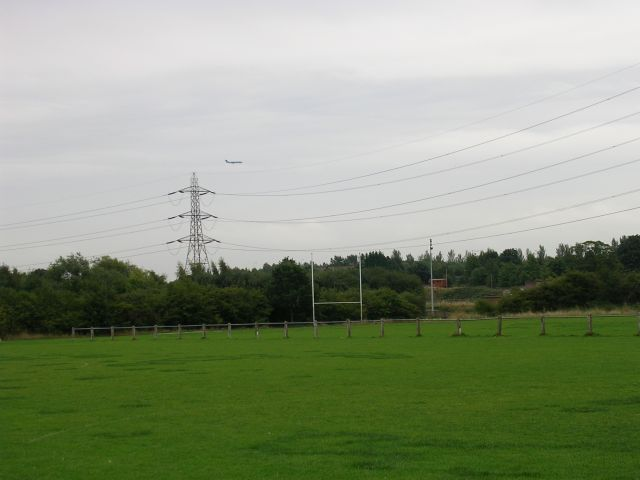

- Location within Greater Manchester
- Location: Mill Gate Lane, East Didsbury, Manchester, England
- Coordinates: 53.402°N 2.237°W
- Owner: Old Bedians RUFC; Bedians AFC; CLG Oisín
- Surface: Grass
- Public transit: East Didsbury railway station

Construction
- Opened: 1966

Old Bedians Sports Centre /ˈbiːdiːənz/ is a mixed use sports centre located in East Didsbury, Greater Manchester. It is home to Old Bedians RUFC, Bedians AFC, and CLG Oisín. It is also the principal Gaelic games facility in North West England, and the main pitch currently used by Lancashire GAA.

== History ==
Old Bedians RUFC was set up by former students of St Bede's College, Manchester, in 1954, with the help of former Sale player Des Pastore. While the team originally hired a field on Mauldeth Road from a local farmer, and later the former Chorltonville Tennis Club, in 1965 the facilities at Old Bedians were purchased as a larger home for the club, with the Bedians football club invited to join the rugby club's relocation at the same time.

In April 1991, the clubhouse was destroyed by fire, and the associate clubs based at Old Bedians formed a committee to build the current brick clubhouse. CLG Oisín established themselves permanently at Old Bedians in 1992 in tandem with the new clubhouse efforts, having not had a permanent home since the closing of the local Gaelic League club in 1954.

Lancashire GAA currently use Old Bedians as their main facility and county ground, with new pitches at Broughton Park RUFC in development to open in late 2026.
