= Sands MacSwineys GFC =

Gaelic football club in Scotland

- Cumann Peil Sands Mac Suibhne
- Founded: 1986
- County: Scotland
- Grounds: St Ambrose High School, Coatbridge
Outfield Kit	Goalkeeper Kit

Sands MacSwineys Gaelic Football Club is a Gaelic football team formed in 1986 and based in the Lanarkshire town of Coatbridge, Scotland. It is the longest running GAA club in Scotland. The club plays its home matches at St Ambrose Gaelic Ground.

== History ==
Sands MacSwineys were founded in 1986, being named using an amalgam of the names of hunger strikers Bobby Sands and Terence MacSwiney. The club was formed out of the Pearse Harps club in Glasgow when Coatbridge-based players within Pearce Harps setup felt "it would be more appropriate to give birth to a more local based team in an area previously renowned for its Gaelic sports activities".

== Honours ==
In Sands' first season in existence the club went all the way 1986 final of the Glasgow Championship before being beaten by St Patrick's. In 1988 Sands won their first major trophy, the Ó Fiaich Cup. The Ó Fiaich Cup was brought back to Coatbridge again in 1996. Sands MacSwineys won the Championship in 1990, 1991 and 1999, and have also won the Pearse Cup. Sands' also won the League two years in succession, 1998 and 1999. The club would go on to win the inaugural Junior Championship in 2015.

The GAA currently have a full-time development officer based in Coatbridge.
