= St Lawrence's GAA (Manchester) =

Gaelic football club in Manchester, England

- Naomh Labhrais na Piarsaigh
- Founded: 1981
- County: Lancashire
- Nickname: Lawrences
- Colours: Yellow and purple
- Grounds: Turn Moss, Stretford

Playing kits
Standard colours

St Lawrence's na Piarsaigh GAC (Irish: Naomh Labhrais na Piarsaig Cumann Lúthchleas Gael) is a Gaelic football club in Stretford, Manchester.

Lawrences play both men's and ladies' junior football, with a number of both boys and girls under-age teams. They are one of the member clubs of the Lancashire County Board.

== History ==
Lawrences were formed in May 1981 by Tommy Duffy, Fr. Emmett Fullen (for whom Fullen Gaels are named), Kevin Fullen, and Harry Purcell. They named the club after the church adjacent to the St Brendan's Irish Centre in Old Trafford, as St Brendan's were already an established club in Manchester. The St Lawrence's church closed in 1994.

The club chose the colours of Wexford due to their original colour choice of red being dominated in the local area by Manchester United and a desire to be distinct. Lawrences' immediately established a strong underage development programme in order to progress as a major team within the highly competitive Lancashire club competitions. On the basis of a youth-centred policy, the club claimed their first Lancashire Junior and Senior Championships in 1998. They would go on to win the Senior Championship again in 2003, and the Junior Championship in 2020 and 2021.

The first attempt to set up the St Lawrence's ladies' team was in 1983, with the current team starting up in 1989. They are four times Lancashire champions, in 2016, 2022, 2023, and 2024.

== Honours ==
=== Men's football ===
- Lancashire Senior Football Championship (2)
  - 1998, 2003
- Lancashire Senior Football League (2)
  - 2003, 2004
- Pennine Senior Football League (3)
  - 2002, 2005, 2008
- Pennine Senior Football Shield (3)
  - 2010, 2011, 2013
- Lancashire Junior Football Championship (3)
  - 1998, 2020, 2021
- Lancashire Junior Football League (2)
  - 1999, 2004
- Wolfe Tone Cup (5)
  - 2002, 2003, 2004, 2012, 2022
- Lancashire Junior B Championship (1)
  - 2018
- Lancashire Junior B League (2)
  - 2018, 2019

=== Ladies' football ===
- Lancashire Junior Ladies' Football Championship (4)
  - 2016, 2022, 2023, 2024
