= Ceann Creige Hurling and Camogie Club =

Gaelic Athletic Association club in Glasgow, Scotland

- Cumann Iománaíochta agus Camógaíochta Ceann Creige
- Founded: 2019
- County: Scotland
- Colours: Green and Black
- Grounds: Clydebank Community Sports Hub, Clydebank
Home Kit	Alternate Kit

Ceann Creige Hurling and Camogie Club is a Gaelic Athletic Association club located in Glasgow, Scotland.

== History ==
Ceann Creige was founded in Craigend in 2019, with the team playing their first competitive hurling match in 2021. Their match against Liverpool Wolfe Tones marked the first competitive hurling match to be played in Scotland since 1913.

As of 2026, the club fields teams in the Lancashire Senior Hurling League and Lancashire Senior Hurling Championship, due to the lack of opponents in Scotland. Ceann Creige have also made a number of appearances in the All-Britain Club Hurling Championship.The camogie team plays in the All-Britain Senior Camogie Championship, having won the Intermediate Championship in 2024.

== Honours ==
=== Hurling ===
- Lancashire Senior Hurling League (2): 2023, 2025
- Lancashire Senior Hurling Championship (2): 2023, 2025 (runners-up in 2022)
- All Britain Junior Club Hurling Championship (0): (runners-up in 2025)

=== Camogie ===
- All Britain Intermediate Camogie League (1): 2024
- All Britain Intermediate Camogie Championship (1): 2024
- All Ireland Junior B Club Camogie Championship (0): (runners-up in 2024)
