= St Peter's GAA (Manchester) =

Gaelic football club in Manchester, England

- CLG Naomh Peadar
- Founded: 1978
- County: Lancashire
- Nickname: Peters
- Colours: Black and gold
- Grounds: Hough End, Chorlton

Playing kits
Standard colours

St Peter's GAC (Irish: Cumann Lúthchleas Gael Naomh Peadar) is a Gaelic football club in Chorlton, Manchester.

St Peter's play football at the junior level, having formerly fielded a senior team, as well as an under-age set-up. They are one of the member clubs of the Lancashire County Board.

The club is one of the most successful clubs in Lancashire, with 11 Senior Lancashire championship titles and 3 All-Britain titles. St Peter's play their home games at Hough End in Chorlton.

In 2015, St Peters played an exhibition match against Liverpool Wolfe Tones at Eirias Stadium, Colwyn Bay.

== Honours ==
- All-Britain Club Football Championship (3)
  - 2004, 2010, 2012
- Lancashire Senior Football Championship (11)
  - 1987, 1992, 1993, 1995, 1997, 2000, 2001, 2004, 2005, 2010, 2012
- Lancashire Senior Football League (3)
  - 2010, 2011, 2012
- Pennine Football League (2)
  - 2012, 2013
- Lancashire Junior Football Championship (2)
  - 2011, 2018
- Lancashire Junior Football League (4)
  - 2010, 2012, 2014, 2020
  - Intermediate (Shield) (1)
  - 2026
- Wolfe Tone Cup (3)
  - 2008, 2023, 2026
- Lancashire Junior B Cup (1)
  - 2024

== Notable players ==
- Ronan Crowley
