= Dunedin Connollys GFC =

Scottish Gaelic football club

- Dún Éideann Uí Chonghaile
- Founded: 1988
- County: Scotland
- Nickname: Connollys
- Colours: Green and navy
- Grounds: Wardie Recreation Ground, Edinburgh

Playing kits
Home Kit	Change Kit

Dunedin Connollys Gaelic Football Club (Irish: Cumann Lúthchleas Gael Dún Éideann Uí Chonghaile) is a Gaelic football club based in Edinburgh, Scotland. The club competes under Scotland GAA, currently run men's teams at senior, intermediate and junior level, as well as two ladies' teams and an underage set-up known as 'Dunedin Og'.

Founded in 1988, the club takes its name from 'Dùn Èideann', the Scottish Gaelic name for Edinburgh, and the surname of Edinburgh-born Irish republican and socialist leader James Connolly. Dunedin Connollys have won the Scottish Championship 17 times and the British GAA title four times, most recently in 2018.

== History ==
Dunedin Connollys was founded in 1988, through a chance encounter between Father Eamonn Sweeney and Belfast native Anthony Haughey at an Irish dancing show on Leith Walk, in the north of Edinburgh. Initially, the team consisted of first and second generation local Irish immigrants from a working-class background, training on The Meadows and playing home matches at St Augustine's High School. The establishment of the British University Gaelic Football Championship in the early 1990s saw the club provided with a wider playing pool from the Heriot-Watt, Edinburgh Napier and University of Edinburgh teams, and the club's first tournament success came in 1993 with victory in the O’Fiach Cup. A year later, Connollys won their maiden Scottish Championship title.

In 1998, the club began ground-sharing with Portobello RFC, at Cavalry Park in Duddingston. After losses to St Peter's, Lancashire, in 2004 and Harlsden Harps, London, in 2005, Connollys won their maiden British Championship in 2009, beating holders John Mitchels, Lancashire, by a score of 1–08 to 2-04 in the final. Connollys would go on to win three consecutive British titles between 2016 and 2018. On each occasion, victory in Britain has led to Connollys' competing in the All-Ireland Junior Club Football Championship.

The ladies' team was fielded for the first time in 1998, initially competing in the Ladies University Championship and later moving to the main Scottish and Britain club championship system. In 2013, Connollys won the All-Britain Junior Ladies' Club Football Championship, going on to contest the All Ireland Junior Ladies' Club Football Championship. After defeating Shane O'Neills, Armagh, in the quarter-final and St Helen's, Longford, in the semi-final, the ladies' were defeated by Na Gaeil, Kerry, in the final. Connollys ladies have gone on to win 5 All-Britains, including 4 intermediate titles, and have lost a further 3 finals.

Former Connollys players include former Mayo panellists Frank Molloy and Sean Malee, as well as Mayo U21s player Conor Horan and Tyrone minors player Ronan McGurk . For Connollys ladies, Caoilfhionn Deeney won the All-Ireland title with Wicklow in 2011, while Rosanna Heeney appeared in two All-Ireland finals with Louth in 2010 and 2012. Dunedin currently has members from both Scotland and the Irish counties, including Mayo, Kerry, Carlow, Kildare, Tyrone, Leitrim, Sligo, Laois, Donegal, Tipperary, Derry, Armagh, and Roscommon.

=== Club results in All-Ireland championships ===
Team	Championship	Year	Quarter-final	Semi-final	Final
Men's	All-Ireland Junior Club Football Championship	2010-11	Emyvale (Monaghan)		
Men's	All-Ireland Junior Club Football Championship	2016-17	Rosenallis (Laois)	Rock St Patricks (Tyrone)	
Men's	All-Ireland Junior Club Football Championship	2017-18	Naomh Colmcille (Donegal)		
Men's	All-Ireland Junior Club Football Championship	2018-19	Red Hughs (Donegal)		
Ladies'	All-Ireland Junior Ladies' Club Football Championship	2013	Shane O'Neills (Armagh)	St Helens (Longford)	Na Gaeil (Kerry)
Ladies'	All-Britain Intermediate Ladies' Club Football Championship	2014	Castleisland Desmonds (Kerry)		
Ladies'	All-Britain Intermediate Ladies' Club Football Championship	2015	Glenamaddy/Williamstown (Galway)		
Ladies'	All-Britain Intermediate Ladies' Club Football Championship	2018	Na Gaeil (Kerry)	Aghabog Emmets (Monaghan)	
Ladies'	All-Britain Intermediate Ladies' Club Football Championship	2024	Annaghdown (Galway)		

== Honours ==
=== Men's football ===
- All-Britain Senior Club Football Championship
  - Winners: 2009, 2016, 2017, 2018
  - Runners-up: 2004, 2005
- Scottish Senior Football Championship
  - Winners: 1994, 2003, 2004, 2005, 2007, 2008, 2009, 2010, 2011, 2013, 2014, 2015, 2016, 2017, 2018, 2019, 2021, 2024
- Scottish Junior Football Championship
  - Runners-up: 2016

=== Ladies' football ===
- All-Britain Intermediate Ladies' Club Football Championship
  - Winners: 2014, 2015, 2018, 2024
- All-Ireland Junior Ladies' Club Football Championship
  - Runners up: 2013
- All-Britain Junior Ladies' Club Football Championship
  - Winners: 2013
- Scottish Senior Ladies' Football Championship
  - Winners: 2014, 2015
