= Dún Deagh Dálriada =

Dundee Dalriada
- Dún Déagh Dálriada
- County: Scotland
- Colours: Black and Gold
- Grounds: sheddocksley playing fields
{{{kit1}}}

Dundee Dalriada Gaelic Football Club (Irish: Cumann Peile Dún Déagh Dálriada) is a Gaelic football club that was founded in the City of Dundee, Scotland. Their team play in black and gold horizontally striped jerseys, black shorts and black socks. The club's name comes from the ancient Celtic kingdom, Dál Riata, which preceded the Gaelic Kingdom of Alba which spanned Argyllshire and Northern Antrim.

Dundee Dalriada moved to Aberdeen for the 2013 season and shall remain there for the foreseeable future. Matches and training are held at Sheddocksley playing fields.

Dundee Dalriada ladies was formed at the end of 2013.
