= Greenbank Park =

Park in Liverpool, England

Coordinates: 53.38664°N 2.92552°W

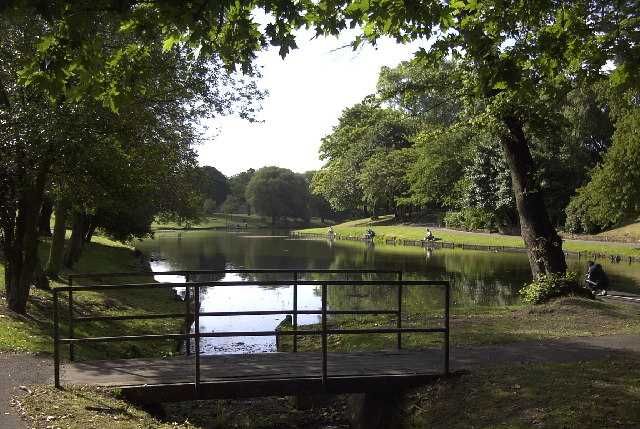
- Interactive map of Greenbank Park
- Type: Public park
- Location: Liverpool, England
- Created: 1897
- Operator: Liverpool City Council
- Status: Open all year
- Website: liverpool.gov.uk/parks-and-greenspaces/local-parks-and-greenspaces/greenbank-park/

Greenbank Park is a public park in Liverpool, England, with the middle of the park dominated by a small lake. It is situated in the suburb of Mossley Hill in the south of the city, close to Penny Lane and Sefton Park.

== Historical background ==
From 1788 to 1940, the Rathbone family owned nearby Greenbank House. In 1897 Liverpool Corporation entered into an agreement with the Rathbone family to purchase land for £13,000 (equivalent to £1.81 million in 2023), part of which became Greenbank Park. The walled garden is all that remains of the Rathbone estate on the park.

== Current usage ==
Greenbank Park has a children's playground, football, pitches, and a fishing pond, as well as mature trees and a conservation area. The pond provides the focal point within the park. Visitors are able to fish and can watch nesting waterfowl and herons. There is a bridge at the northern end of the pond. Much of the area is open parkland with trees to the perimeter.

There is a walled garden containing an artwork dedicated to Eleanor Rathbone by artist Lulu Quinn.
