= Glasgow Gaels GFC =

Glasgow Gaels
- Gaeil Glaschu
- Founded: 1999
- County: Scotland
- Colours: Red and white
- Grounds: Clydebank Sports Hub, Clydebank; Peterson Park, Yoker

Gaelic football

Ladies' football

Glasgow Gaels GFC (Irish: Cumann Peile Ghaeil Ghlaschú; Scottish Gaelic: Comann Ball-Coise Ghàidheil Ghlaschu), also known as Glaschu Gaels, is a Gaelic Athletic Association club based in Glasgow, Scotland. The club is a member of Scotland GAA and fields both men’s and ladies’ Gaelic football teams, as well as a youth structure catering for boys and girls from under-7 to under-17 level.

== History ==
Glaschu Gaels were formed in 1999 after the amalgamation of two local sides, Glencovitt Rovers and Paisley Gaels.

Both the men's and the ladies' teams have enjoyed significant successes, with the men winning the All-Britain Football Championship in 2022, and the women winning the ladies' football equivalent in 2016 and 2023. On all three occasions, the Glasgow sides were defeated in All-Ireland quarter finals, with the men falling to Stewartstown Harps, and the ladies losing to St Maurs in 2016 and O'Donovan Rossa in 2023.

The club has links with the university teams at Glasgow, Strathclyde, and Stirling, with several club players attending each institution.

== Honours ==
=== Men's football ===
- All-Britain Club Football Championship
  - Winners: 2022
- Scottish Senior Football Championship
  - Winners: 2002, 2006, 2019, 2022, 2023
- Scottish Senior Football League
  - Winners: 2003, 2005, 2008, 2019
- Scottish Intermediate Football Championship
  - Winners: 2024
- Scottish Junior Football Championship
  - Winners: 2016, 2017, 2018, 2022, 2024
- Men’s Scottish Junior League
  - Winners: 2016, 2017

=== Ladies' football ===
- European Ladies' Football Championship
  - Winners: 2016, 2023
- Scottish Senior Ladies' Football Championship
  - Winners: 2006
- Scottish Intermediate Ladies' Football Championship
  - Winners: 2015, 2016, 2023
- Scottish Intermediate Ladies' Football League
  - Winners: 2016, 2019
- All-Britain Junior Ladies' Club Football Championship
  - Winners: 2016, 2023
- Scottish Junior Ladies' Football Championship
  - Winners: 2023, 2025
- Scottish Junior Ladies' Football League
  - Winners: 2016
