= Liverpool Wolfe Tones GAA =

Gaelic football club in Liverpool, England

Wolfe Tones GAA
- Learpholl Uilf Tón CLG
- Founded: 2010
- County: Lancashire
- Nickname: Tones
- Colours: Green, white, and yellow
- Grounds: Wavertree Park, Wavertree

Playing kits
Standard colours

Liverpool Wolfe Tones Gaelic Athletic Club (Irish: Learpholl Uilf Tón Cumann Lúthchleas Gael) is a Gaelic football club in Wavertree, Liverpool.

Tones play Gaelic football at men's and ladies' junior levels, as well as maintaining a hurling team, camogie team, and various under-age teams. They are one of the member clubs of the Lancashire County Board.

== History ==
The men's football team began playing regular competitive football in 2011, with the ladies' team formed a year later. The ladies' footballers reached the Junior All-Britain final in their first three competitive seasons in 2012, 2013 and 2014, winning on their third attempt. They were promoted to the Northern Britain Intermediate Ladies' Football Championship in 2015.

The hurling club originated from a Facebook page, with the team officially ratified as affiliated with the Wolfe Tones in late-2012. The camogie team was formally inducted into the club in 2014, and became All-Britain Junior Camogie Champions in their first competitive season.

The club crest depicts the Liver bird, Theobald Wolfe Tone, the Red Rose of Lancashire, and a ship to represent Irish migrants making Liverpool their home.

== Honours ==
=== Men's football ===
- Wolfe Tone Cup (2)
  - 2014, 2022
- Pennine Junior Football League (2)
  - 2014, 2018
- Lancashire Junior Football League (1)
  - 2022

=== Ladies' football ===
- All-Britain Junior Ladies Football Championship (1)
  - 2014
- All-Britain Northern Junior Ladies Football League (1)
  - 2014
- Lancashire Junior Ladies Football Championship (2)
  - 2017, 2018
- Lancashire Junior Ladies Football League (1)
  - 2015

=== Hurling ===
- All-Britain Junior Hurling Shield (3)
  - 2014, 2017, 2021
- Lancashire Senior Hurling Championship (1)
  - 2015

=== Camogie ===
- All-Britain Junior Camogie Championship (1)
  - 2015
- All-Britain Junior Camogie League (1)
  - 2018
