= List of Gaelic games competitions =

Gaelic games competitions are competitive events, organised either by the Gaelic Athletic Association (GAA) on its own or in association with other organisations in which Gaelic games or a set of compromise rules are played.

== International ==
- International Rules Series – Sporadic two-game series played between Ireland and Australia using a combination of rules from Gaelic football and Australian rules football.
- Hurling/Shinty International Series – Annual competition played between Ireland and Scotland using a combination of rules from hurling and shinty.

== Interprovincial ==
- GAA Interprovincial Championships in Gaelic football and hurling. Contested by four teams representing the Irish provinces Connacht, Leinster, Munster and Ulster.

== Intercounty ==
The following are competitions contested by GAA county teams;

=== Football ===
- All-Ireland Senior Football Championship (Sam Maguire Cup) – Tier 1 inter-county competition contested by teams of players selected from clubs within a county. Includes the Provincial championships and played on an initial group basis leading to play-offs. Most prestigious competition in Gaelic Football.
- Tailteann Cup – Tier 2 inter-county competition. For counties eliminated in the early stages of the All-Ireland Championship and/or unable to be promoted to Division 2 or above of the League. Commenced in 2022.
- All-Ireland Junior Football Championship - Tier 3 inter-county competition.
- National Football League – Played in spring, contested by representative county teams. Teams are divided into four divisions based on their performances from the previous year.
- All-Ireland Under-20 Football Championship – Knockout competition for players under the age of 20.
- All-Ireland Minor Football Championship - Knockout competition for players under the age of 17.
- Hastings Cup – Regional Under 21 football competition played from 1986 to 2017, organized by Longford County Board.
- Fr. Manning Cup – Regional Juvenile football competition since 1965, organized by Longford County Board.
- O'Byrne Cup – Preseason competition for Leinster counties.
- Dr McKenna Cup – Preseason competition for Ulster counties.
- McGrath Cup – Preseason competition for Munster counties.
- FBD Insurance League – Preseason competition for Connacht counties.
- Jim McGuigan Cup – League competition for county minor (U17) teams in Ulster plus Sligo. Games are played in March and April.
- Tommy Murphy Cup (defunct) – Secondary competition for teams knocked out of the early rounds of the All-Ireland Senior Championship, it was abolished in 2008.
- Owen Treacy Cup (defunct) – Winners of Tommy Murphy Cup v North American select team, it was only played once in 2006.

=== Hurling ===
- All-Ireland Senior Hurling Championship (Liam MacCarthy Cup) – Tier 1 inter-county competition contested by teams of players selected from all the clubs within a county. Includes the Provincial championships and played on an initial group basis leading to play-offs. Most prestigious competition in Hurling.
- Joe McDonagh Cup – Tier 2 inter-county competition.
- Christy Ring Cup – Tier 3 (was Tier 2 prior to 2018) inter-county competition.
- Nicky Rackard Cup – Tier 4 (was Tier 3 prior to 2018) inter-county competition.
- Lory Meagher Cup – Tier 5 (was Tier 4 prior to 2018) inter-county competition.
- National Hurling League – Played in spring, Contested by teams selected from all the clubs within a county. Teams are divided into six divisions based on their performances from the previous year. Top 2 teams from each division enter a knockout phase.
- All-Ireland Under-20 Hurling Championship – Knockout competition for players under the age of 21 at the start of the year.
- All-Ireland Minor Hurling Championship - Knockout competition for players under the age of 18 at the start of the year
- All-Ireland Intermediate Hurling Championship (defunct) - Knockout competition for second teams of senior counties
- Munster Senior Hurling League – Preseason competition for Munster counties.
- Walsh Cup – Preseason competition for tier 1 Leinster counties plus Galway and Antrim.
- Kehoe Cup – Preseason competition for tier 2 Leinster counties.
- Kehoe Shield – Preseason competition for tier 3 Leinster counties.
- Connacht Senior Hurling League – Preseason competition for Connacht counties.
- Conor McGurk Cup – Preseason competition for Ulster counties and universities.

== Interclub ==
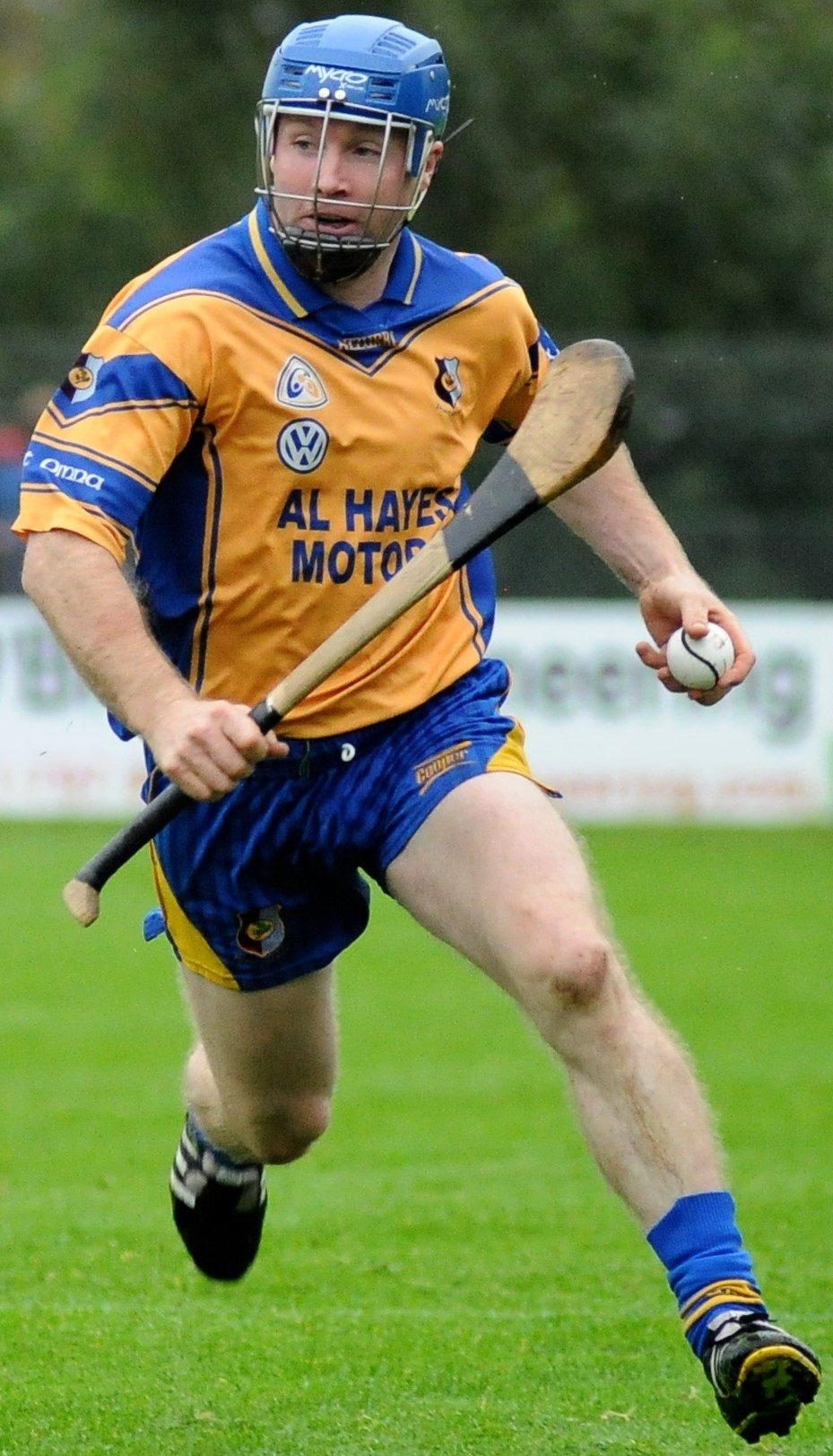
Damien Hayes in action for Portumna in the 2014 Galway Senior Hurling Championship

=== Football ===
- All-Ireland Senior Club Football Championship
- All-Ireland Intermediate Club Football Championship
- All-Ireland Junior Club Football Championship
- Antrim Senior Football Championship
- Armagh Senior Football Championship
- Armagh Junior Football Championship
- Armagh Intermediate Football Championship
- Carlow Senior Football Championship
- Cavan Senior Football Championship
- Cavan Intermediate Football Championship
- Cavan Junior Football Championship
- Cavan Under-21 Football Championship
- Cavan Minor Football Championship
- Clare Senior Football Championship
- Clare Club Football League - Division 1 (Cusack Cup)
- Clare Intermediate Football Championship
- Clare Junior A Football Championship
- Clare Under-21 A Football Championship
- Connacht Senior Club Football Championship
- Connacht Intermediate Club Football Championship
- Connacht Junior Club Football Championship
- Cork Premier Senior Football Championship
- Cork Senior A Football Championship
- Cork Premier Intermediate Football Championship
- Cork Intermediate A Football Championship
- Cork Premier Junior Football Championship
- Cork Junior A Football Championship
- Cork Junior B Football Championship
- Cork Under-21 Football Championship
- Derry Senior Football Championship
- Derry Intermediate Football Championship
- Donegal Senior Football Championship
- Donegal Intermediate Football Championship
- Donegal Junior Football Championship
- Down Senior Football Championship
- Dublin Senior Football Championship
- Dublin Senior B Football Championship
- Dublin Intermediate Football Championship
- Dublin Junior Football Championship
- Dublin Under 21 Football Championship
- Dublin Minor Football Championship
- Duhallow Junior A Football Championship
- East Kerry Senior Football Championship
- East Kerry Junior Football Championship
- Fermanagh Senior Football Championship
- Galway Senior Football Championship
- Kerry Senior Football Championship
- Kerry Club Football Championship
- Kerry Intermediate Football Championship
- Kildare Senior Football Championship
- Kildare Intermediate Football Championship
- Kildare Junior Football Championship
- Kildare Under 21 Football Championship
- Kildare Senior Football League Division 1
- Kildare Senior Football League Division 2
- Kildare Senior Football League Division 3
- Kildare Senior Football League Division 4
- Kilkenny Senior Football Championship
- Kilkenny Intermediate Football Championship
- Laois Senior Football Championship
- Laois Intermediate Football Championship
- Laois Junior Football Championship
- Leinster Senior Club Football Championship
- Leinster Intermediate Club Football Championship
- Leinster Junior Club Football Championship
- Leitrim Senior Football Championship
- Limerick Senior Football Championship
- Longford Senior Football Championship
- Louth Senior Football Championship
- Louth Intermediate Football Championship
- Mayo Senior Football Championship
- Mayo Intermediate Football Championship
- Mayo Junior Football Championship
- Mayo Minor Football Championship
- Meath Senior Football Championship
- Meath Intermediate Football Championship
- Meath Junior Football Championship
- Mid Kerry Senior Football Championship
- Monaghan Senior Football Championship
- Munster Senior Club Football Championship
- Munster Intermediate Club Football Championship
- Munster Junior Club Football Championship
- North Kerry Senior Football Championship
- Offaly Senior Football Championship
- Roscommon Senior Football Championship
- Sligo Senior Football Championship
- Sligo Intermediate Football Championship
- Sligo Junior Football Championship
- Sligo Under 20 Football Championship
- Tipperary Senior Football Championship
- Tipperary Intermediate Football Championship
- Tyrone Senior Football Championship
- Ulster Senior Club Football Championship
- Ulster Intermediate Club Football Championship
- Ulster Junior Club Football Championship
- Ulster Minor Club Football Championship
- Waterford Senior Football Championship
- Waterford Intermediate Football Championship
- Westmeath Senior Football Championship
- Westmeath Intermediate Football Championship
- West Kerry Senior Football Championship
- Wexford Senior Football Championship
- Wicklow Senior Football Championship

=== Hurling ===
- All-Ireland Senior Club Hurling Championship
- All-Ireland Intermediate Club Hurling Championship
- All-Ireland Junior Club Hurling Championship
- All-Ireland Junior B Club Hurling Championship
- Antrim Senior Hurling Championship
- Antrim Intermediate Hurling Championship
- Antrim Junior Hurling Championship
- Armagh Senior Hurling Championship
- Carlow Senior Hurling Championship
- Carlow Intermediate Hurling Championship
- Carlow Junior Hurling Championship
- Cavan Senior Hurling Championship
- Clare Senior Hurling Championship
- Clare Intermediate Hurling Championship
- Clare Junior A Hurling Championship
- Clare Under-21 A Hurling Championship
- Connacht Senior Club Hurling Championship
- Connacht Intermediate Club Hurling Championship
- Connacht Junior Club Hurling Championship
- Cork Premier Senior Hurling Championship
- Cork Senior A Hurling Championship
- Cork Premier Intermediate Hurling Championship
- Cork Intermediate A Hurling Championship
- Cork Premier Junior Hurling Championship
- Cork Junior A Hurling Championship
- Cork Junior B Hurling Championship
- Cork Under-21 Hurling Championship
- Derry Senior Hurling Championship
- Derry Intermediate Hurling Championship
- Derry Junior Hurling Championship
- Donegal Senior Hurling Championship
- Donegal Intermediate Hurling Championship
- Down Senior Hurling Championship
- Down Intermediate Hurling Championship
- Dublin Senior Hurling Championship
- Dublin Senior 2 Hurling Championship
- Dublin Senior 3 Hurling Championship
- Dublin Intermediate Hurling Championship
- Dublin Junior Hurling Championship
- Dublin Minor Hurling Championship
- Duhallow Junior A Hurling Championship
- Fermanagh Senior Hurling Championship
- Galway Senior Hurling Championship
- Galway Intermediate Hurling Championship
- Galway Junior A Hurling Championship
- Kerry Senior Hurling Championship
- Kerry Intermediate Hurling Championship
- Kerry Under-21 Hurling Championship
- Kildare Senior Hurling Championship
- Kildare Senior B Hurling Championship
- Kildare Intermediate Hurling Championship
- Kilkenny Senior Hurling Championship
- Kilkenny Intermediate Hurling Championship
- Kilkenny Premier Junior Hurling Championship
- Laois Senior Hurling Championship
- Laois Premier Intermediate Hurling Championship
- Laois Intermediate Hurling Championship
- Laois Junior Hurling Championship
- Leinster Senior Club Hurling Championship
- Leinster Intermediate Club Hurling Championship
- Leinster Junior Club Hurling Championship
- Leitrim Senior Hurling Championship
- Limerick Senior Hurling Championship
- Limerick Premier Intermediate Hurling Championship
- Limerick Intermediate Hurling Championship
- Limerick Junior A Hurling Championship
- Longford Senior Hurling Championship
- Louth Senior Hurling Championship
- Mayo Senior Hurling Championship
- Meath Senior Hurling Championship
- Meath Senior B Hurling Championship
- Meath Intermediate Hurling Championship
- Monaghan Senior Hurling Championship
- Monaghan Junior Hurling Championship
- Munster Senior Club Hurling Championship
- Munster Intermediate Club Hurling Championship
- Munster Junior Club Hurling Championship
- Offaly Senior Hurling Championship
- Offaly Senior B Hurling Championship
- Offaly Intermediate Hurling Championship
- Offaly Junior A Hurling Championship
- Roscommon Senior Hurling Championship
- Sligo Senior Hurling Championship
- Tipperary Senior Hurling Championship
- Tipperary Premier Intermediate Hurling Championship
- Tipperary Intermediate Hurling Championship
- Tipperary Junior A Hurling Championship
- Tyrone Senior Hurling Championship
- Tyrone Junior Hurling Championship
- Ulster Senior Club Hurling Championship
- Ulster Intermediate Club Hurling Championship
- Ulster Junior Club Hurling Championship
- Waterford Senior Hurling Championship
- Waterford Premier Intermediate Hurling Championship
- Waterford Intermediate Hurling Championship
- Waterford Junior A Hurling Championship
- Waterford U16 Hurling Championship
- Westmeath Senior Hurling Championship
- Westmeath Senior B Hurling Championship
- Westmeath Intermediate Hurling Championship
- Wexford Senior Hurling Championship
- Wexford Intermediate Hurling Championship
- Wexford Intermediate A Hurling Championship
- Wexford Junior Hurling Championship
- Wicklow Senior Hurling Championship
- Wicklow Intermediate Hurling Championship

== Intervarsity ==
Competitions organised by Higher Education GAA for teams based at third-level education institutions.

=== Football ===
- Sigerson Cup – All-Ireland competition for the Universities of Ireland
- Trench Cup
- British University Gaelic football Championship

=== Hurling ===
- Fitzgibbon Cup – All-Ireland competition for the Universities of Ireland
- Ryan Cup
- British University Hurling Championship

== Intercolleges ==
=== Dual ===
- All-Ireland Vocational Schools Championship - football and hurling competition. County teams made up of players from Vocational schools at Under-18, U-16 and U-14 levels.

=== Football ===
- Hogan Cup – All-Ireland football competition for provincial school championship winners
- Connacht Championship – Connacht senior A football championship for secondary schools
- Leinster Championship – Leinster senior A football championship for secondary schools
- Corn Uí Mhuirí (Munster Championship) – Munster senior A football championship for secondary schools
- MacRory Cup (Ulster Championship) – Ulster senior A football championship for secondary schools
- Frewen Cup - Munster junior football championship for secondary schools

=== Hurling ===
- Dr Croke Cup - All-Ireland Senior A hurling competition for secondary schools
- Paddy Buggy Cup - All-Ireland Senior B hurling competition for secondary schools
- Leinster Colleges Senior Hurling Championship
- Dr Harty Cup – Munster senior A hurling championship for secondary schools
- Dean Ryan Cup – Munster schools junior hurling championship
- Mageean Cup – Ulster schools senior hurling championship

== Youth ==
- Feile Peil na nÓg

== Interfirm ==
- All Ireland Interfirm Senior Football Championship
- All Ireland Interfirm Junior Football Championship
- All Ireland Interfirm Senior Hurling Championship
- All Ireland Interfirm Junior Hurling Championship

== Competitions outside Ireland ==
=== North American Youth Competitions ===
- Continental Youth Championships (CYC)

=== New York City ===
- New York Senior Football Championship
- New York Senior Hurling Championship

=== North American Board area ===
The four major divisions of the North American GAA each have a divisional championship in each code and each grade. Divisional winners, and sometimes runners-up, go on to the North American finals which are played over the Labor Day weekend in September.

- North American Senior Football Championship
- North American Senior Hurling Championship

=== Britain ===
- London Senior Football Championship
- London Senior Hurling Championship
- London Intermediate Football Championship
- London Intermediate Hurling Championship
- London Junior Football Championship
- London Reserve Football Championship

=== Colleges ===
- Northern California Collegiate Hurling Championship
- Midwest Collegiate Hurling Championship

== See also ==
- Players Champions Cup
