= 2016 GAA Interprovincial Championships =

2016 GAA season
- Football Champions: Ulster
- Hurling Champions: Munster

The 2016 GAA Interprovincial Championships (formerly known as the Railway Cups) was a senior GAA competition in which the four provinces of Ireland competed in Gaelic football and hurling. The provincial squads are made up of players from the county panels in each province.

Connacht were the reigning football champions whilst Leinster were the reigning hurling champions from 2014. Due to adverse weather conditions, the 2015 inter-provincials did not take place.

Ulster were the Football champions and Munster were the Hurling champions.

== Football Championship ==
=== Football Managers ===
- Ger O’Sullivan (Cork & Munster)
- John Tobin (Galway & Connacht)
- Pete McGrath (Down & Ulster)
- Seán Kelly (Meath & Leinster)

=== Football Semi-finals ===
11 December 2016
14:00
Semi-final

Ulster	3-17 - 1-15	Munster
Peter Harte (1-8, 0-4 frees, 1-0 penalty); Stefan Campbell (0-5); Tomas Corrigan (0-4, 0-2 frees); Enda Lynn, Aidan Breen (1-0)	Report	Paul Whyte (0-4, 0-3 frees); Jamie Malone (1-0); David Tubridy (0-3); Ian Corbett (0-2); Gary Brennan, Tommy Walsh, Brian Fox, Keelan Sexton, Ruairi Deane (0-1); Conor Sweeney (0-1 free)

Parnell Park
Referee: Anthony Nolan (Wicklow)
10 December 2016
18:00
Semi-final

Connacht	2-17 - 1-18	Leinster
N Murphy (1-3); J Doherty (0-6, 0-4 frees); C Murtagh (1-1); D Cummins (0-3), F Cregg, D Comer, E Smith, N Daly (0-1)	Report	J Heslin (0-10, 0-8 frees); K Martin (1-1), D Foley, J McGrath, J Byrne, D Byrne, P Sharry, S O'Rourke, J O'Loughlin (0-1)

Parnell Park
Referee: N Mooney (Cavan)

=== Football final ===
17 December 2016
14:00
Final

Connacht	3-10—2-16	Ulster
C Murtagh 2-3, D Comer 1-1, J Doherty 0-2 (2f), E Smith 0-1, D Cummins 0-1, E Mulligan 0-1 (1f), P Conroy 0-1.	Report	P Harte 0-5 (4f), A Breen 1-2, T Corrigan 0-4 (2f), C Vernon 1-1, E Lynn 0-3, S Campbell 0-1

Páirc Seán Mac Diarmada, Carrick-on-Shannon
Referee: Padraig O'Sullivan (Kerry)

== Hurling Championship ==
=== Hurling Managers ===
- Anthony Daly (Clare & Munster)
- Micheál Donoghue (Galway & Connacht)
- Terence McNaughton (Antrim & Ulster)
- Ciarán Hetherton (Dublin & Leinster)

=== Hurling Semi-finals ===
11 December 2016
13:45
Semi-final

Munster	3-21 - 0-15	Ulster
Seamus Callanan (1-7, 0-6 frees); Michael Breen (1-1); Barry Nash (0-4); Stephen Bennett (1-0); John O'Dwyer (0-2); Diarmaid Byrnes, Tom Murnane, Shane Dowling, Pádraic Maher, David Reidy, Shane Bennett, Dan McCormack (0-1)	Report	Ciarán Clarke (0-7, 0-6 frees); Conor Corvan (0-3); Conor O'Prey (0-2, 0-1 frees); Danny Cullen, Niall McKenna, Conor Woods (0-1)

Semple Stadium, Thurles
Attendance: 100
Referee: Sean Cleere (Kilkenny)
10 December 2016
14:45
Semi-final

Leinster	1-14 - 1-12	Connacht
L Chin (1-4); S Dooley (0-3 frees); C Crummey, S Ryan, W Walsh, C Fennelly, R O'Dwyer, G Keegan, M Kavanagh (0-1)	Report	J Cooney (1-0), C Cooney (0-3 frees); N Burke (0-3, 0-1 free); J Skehill (0-1 free); J Flynn (0-1 sideline); D Burke; C Mannion, A Harte, P Flaherty (0-1)

MacDonagh Park, Nenagh
Attendance: 100
Referee: C Lyons (Cork)

=== Hurling final ===
15 December 2016
19:45
Final

Munster	2-20 - 2-16	Leinster
S Callanan - Tipperary (0-7, 0-4 frees, 0-1 '65); D Reidy - Clare (1-2); A Cadogan - Cork (0-3); D McCormack - Tipperary, B Nash - Limerick (0-2); D Byrnes - Limerick, J Barron - Waterford, M Breen - Tipperary, A Shanagher - Clare, Stephen Bennett - Waterford (0-1)	Report	TJ Reid - Kilkenny (1-6, 0-4 frees); W Walsh - Kilkenny (0-4); L Chin - Wexford (1-1), C Dwyer - Laois, G Keegan - Kildare (0-2); S Dooley - Offaly (0-1)

Semple Stadium
Attendance: 592
Referee: Alan Kelly (Galway)
