= British University Men's Gaelic Football Championship =

British University Men's Gaelic Football Championships
- Code: Gaelic football (Third Level Institutions)
- Founded: 1991
- Region: Britain (GAA)
- Trophy: Kevin Fallon Trophy
- Title holders: University of Liverpool (1st title)
- Most titles: Liverpool John Moores University (12 titles)
- Official website: "British Universities GAA".

The British University GAA Men's Championships are a group of an annual Gaelic football tournaments held for universities in Great Britain. They are organised by the British Universities Gaelic Athletic Association (BUGAA); a branch of the Higher Education GAA committee overseeing Gaelic games in universities across England, Wales, and Scotland. The competition is also overseen by British Universities and Colleges Sport (BUCS). The trophies for British University Gaelic Games Championships memorialise students who were pioneers of Gaelic games at British Universities; the Gaelic Football Championship Trophy is known as the Kevin Fallon Trophy, after a student from Crewe and Alsager College of Higher Education who helped to organise the original competition in 1991.

== History ==
The regions of British GAA (An Bhreatain)

The first attempt to start a British colleges Gaelic football tournament was in 1989, with the tournament revived in 1991 by the students at Crewe and Alsager College of Higher Education, who hosted and won a 5-team tournament. In 1992 Newcastle University and the University of Sunderland jointly hosted a 10-team event on converted rugby pitches, with St Mary's University College taking the first of its titles.

The tournament moved to its current home at Páirc na hÉireann in Solihull for the 1992-93 season, and increased to 12 teams, with Swansea University recording Wales' first and only club championship success to date. The number of participants rose again, to 16, in 1994. The 1995 tournament was interrupted by uncharacteristically heavy snowfall at Páirc na hÉireann, and while the official competition was cancelled, the 8 teams that had already travelled to the West Midlands played a hastily arranged tournament in Erdington, with Luton University defeating Newcastle University in a keenly fought final.

After the interrupted 1995 tournament, a championship review was conducted. Britain was divided into four regions, with each region holding qualifications and sending two qualifying teams to the finals weekend. This quota was raised to three teams per region in 1997, creating a 12-team finals tournament. In 2002, the British University Sports Association (now British Universities and Colleges Sport) recognised Gaelic football as an official university sport, giving university-affiliated teams access to further funding.

In 1999 Joe McDonagh became the first GAA President to attend the British Universities' championships, with his successor, Seán McCague, attending the tournament in 2001 and 2002.

The winners of the Division 1 Championship formerly qualified for the semi-finals of the Trench Cup—the Division 2 championship for universities in Ireland. In 2004, St Mary's University, Twickenham won the Trench Cup, with victory against IT Tallaght in the final, becoming the only non-Irish institution to win the tournament to date. British teams have been runners-up in the competition on two occasions; Liverpool John Moores University in 2007 (losing to St Patrick's College, Drumcondra) and Liverpool Hope University in 2012 (losing to Trinity College Dublin).

In recent years, British university teams have been designated to play in the Corn na Mac Léinn—the Division 3 championship for universities in Ireland—with a mini qualifying tournament played in January at the Clydebank Community Sports Hub in Glasgow. The British teams have seen significant success in the Corn na Mac Léinn, with Liverpool Hope University winning back-to-back trophies in 2018 and 2019, and a combined Liverpool John Moores-Edge Hill University team winning the competition in 2020, 2022, and 2026.

2026 saw the introduction of a separate Scottish University Championship, involving a multi-week knockout tournament between the teams in Scotland. The inaugural competition was won by the University of Glasgow, beating Heriot-Watt University in the final.

== Format ==
Gaelic games in Britain are run by the Gaelic Games Council of Britain, with university competitions organised by the British Universities Gaelic Athletic Association (BUGAA); a branch of the Higher Education GAA committee. British Universities and Colleges Sport (BUCS) are also involved in men's Gaelic football, overseeing the league format and Division 1 Championship.

Teams that are BUCS—affiliated (requiring compliance with specific elibigility criteria) compete from September to February in regional leagues, split into Scotland, Northern England, and Midlands & Southern England. The top eight teams across the BUCS leagues qualifying for the Division 1 Championship tournament in March. The qualifying teams compete in two groups of four to reach the semi-finals and then the final.

BUCS teams that did not qualify for Division 1 drop into the Division 2 Championship. The teams compete in three groups of four. The top eight teams across the three groups compete in knockouts (via quarter finals, semi finals, and a final) for the Division 2 title, with the other four teams forming the Division 3 Championship. The Division 2 and Division 3 Championships are also overseen by BUGAA, but are not BUCS-affiliated, allowing university teams that do not meet the stringent BUCS criteria (generally teams that are launching or relaunching for that season) to compete in shield competitions against teams knocked out of the Division 3 Championships.

== Teams ==
The Scottish teams
The Welsh teams
The Yorkshire and Warwickshire teams
The Hertfordshire and London teams
The Lancashire teams

The teams competing in the BUCS divisions of men's Gaelic football, as of the 2026/27 season, are as follows:

Scottish League	Northern League	Midlands & Southern League
Heriot-Watt University	Liverpool Hope University	Cardiff University
Queen Margaret University	Liverpool John Moores University	Loughborough University
Robert Gordon University	University of Liverpool	Nottingham Trent University
University of Dundee	University of Manchester	St Mary's University, Twickenham
University of Edinburgh		University of Birmingham
University of Glasgow		University of Nottingham
University of Stirling		
University of Strathclyde		

As of the 2026/27 season, the following universities have non-BUCS teams that play in the BUGAA Division 2 and 3 Championships:

- University of Cambridge
- Coventry University
- Durham University
- Edge Hill University
- University of Leeds
- Newcastle University
- Northumbria University
- University of Oxford

== BUGAA Championships rolls of honour ==
=== BUGAA/BUCS Division 1 Championship ===
- 1991 Crewe & Alsager College
- 1992 St Mary's University, Twickenham
- 1993 Swansea University
- 1994 University of Dundee
- 1995 Luton University
- 1996 Liverpool John Moores University
- 1997 St Mary's University, Twickenham
- 1998 St Mary's University, Twickenham
- 1999 Liverpool John Moores University
- 2000 St Mary's University, Twickenham
- 2001 Abertay University
- 2002 St Mary's University, Twickenham
- 2003 St Mary's University, Twickenham
- 2004 St Mary's University, Twickenham
- 2005 St Mary's University, Twickenham
- 2006 Liverpool John Moores University
- 2007 Liverpool John Moores University
- 2008 Liverpool John Moores University
- 2009 Liverpool John Moores University
- 2010 Edinburgh Napier University
- 2011 Liverpool John Moores University
- 2012 Liverpool Hope University
- 2013 Liverpool John Moores University
- 2014 Liverpool John Moores University
- 2015 Liverpool Hope University
- 2016 Liverpool Hope University
- 2017 Robert Gordon University
- 2018 Liverpool Hope University
- 2019 Liverpool Hope University
- 2020 not played
- 2021 not played
- 2022 Liverpool John Moores University
- 2023 Liverpool John Moores University
- 2024 Liverpool Hope University
- 2025 Liverpool John Moores University
- 2026 University of Liverpool

=== BUGAA Division 2 Championship ===
- 2000 University of Central Lancashire
- 2001 St Mary's University, Twickenham (2nd)
- 2002 University of Glamorgan
- 2003 University of Bolton
- 2004 Bangor University
- 2005 University of Glamorgan
- 2006 University of Central Lancashire
- 2007 Sunderland University
- 2008 University of Central Lancashire
- 2009 Liverpool John Moores University (2nd)
- 2010 University of Edinburgh
- 2011 Bangor University
- 2012 University of Glasgow
- 2013 New York Colleges
- 2014 Robert Gordon University
- 2015 Heriot-Watt University
- 2016 Bangor University
- 2017 University of Liverpool
- 2018 Glasgow Caledonian University
- 2019 University of Manchester
- 2020 University of Liverpool
- 2021 not played
- 2022 University of Liverpool
- 2023 University of Manchester
- 2024 Heriot-Watt University
- 2025 University of Manchester
- 2026 Edge Hill University

=== BUGAA Division 3 Championship ===
- 2003 University of Glamorgan
- 2004 University of Aberdeen
- 2005 University of Leeds
- 2006 Sunderland University
- 2007 University of Chester
- 2008 Manchester Metropolitan University / University of Salford
- 2009 Sheffield Hallam University / University of Sheffield
- 2010 University of East London
- 2011 University of Glasgow
- 2012 Teesside University
- 2013 University of Birmingham
- 2014 University of Birmingham
- 2015
- 2016
- 2017 Kingston University
- 2018 Loughborough University
- 2019
- 2020
- 2021
- 2022
- 2023
- 2024
- 2025
- 2026 St Mary's University, Twickenham

=== Winners by university ===
Rank	University	Division 1 wins	Division 2 wins	Division 3 wins
1st place, gold medalist(s)	Liverpool John Moores University	12	1	0
2nd place, silver medalist(s)	St Mary's University, Twickenham	8	1	1
3rd place, bronze medalist(s)	Liverpool Hope University	6	0	0
4	University of Liverpool	1	3	0
5	Robert Gordon University	1	1	0
6	Manchester Metropolitan University	1	0	1
=7	Abertay University	1	0	0
=7	Edinburgh Napier University	1	0	0
=7	Swansea University	1	0	0
=7	University of Bedfordshire	1	0	0
=7	University of Dundee	1	0	0
=8	Bangor University	0	3	0
=8	University of Manchester	0	3	0
=8	University of Lancashire	0	3	0
9	University of South Wales	0	2	1
10	Heriot-Watt University	0	2	0
11	University of Glasgow	0	1	1
=12	Edge Hill University	0	1	0
=12	Glasgow Caledonian University	0	1	0
=12	New York Colleges	0	1	0
=12	University of Sunderland	0	1	0
=12	University of Edinburgh	0	1	0
=12	University of Greater Manchester	0	1	0
13	University of Birmingham	0	0	2
=14	Kingston University	0	0	1
=14	Loughborough University	0	0	1
=14	Sheffield Hallam University	0	0	1
=14	Teesside University	0	0	1
=14	University of Aberdeen	0	0	1
=14	University of Chester	0	0	1
=14	University of East London	0	0	1
=14	University of Leeds	0	0	1
=14	University of Salford	0	0	1
=14	University of Sheffield	0	0	1

== BUGAA Championship finals ==
=== BUGAA/BUCS Division 1 Championship ===
The Division 1 Championships take place each year in March. The 2025/26 tournament took place at Páirc na hÉireann in Birmingham.

Year	Winners	Score		Runners-up	Source
2025-26	Liverpool	1-12	0-13	Liverpool Hope	
2024-25	Liverpool John Moores	2-13	1-06	Liverpool	
2023-24	Liverpool Hope	2–12	2-07	Nottingham Trent	
2022-23	Liverpool John Moores	1–16aet	1-13	Liverpool	
2021-22	Liverpool John Moores	5–14	1–10	Robert Gordon	
2020-21	cancelled due to COVID-19				
2019-20	cancelled due to COVID-19				
2018-19	Liverpool Hope	3-08	2-05	Robert Gordon	
2017-18	Liverpool Hope	1–11	1-06	St Mary's	
2016-17	Robert Gordon	1–14	2–06	St Mary's	
2015-16	Liverpool Hope	4–15	0-04	Dundee	
2014-15	Liverpool Hope	0-08	0-07	New York Colleges	
2013-14	Liverpool John Moores	0–13	1–07	Liverpool Hope	
2012-13	Liverpool John Moores	0–06	0–05	Liverpool Hope	
2011-12	Liverpool Hope	1–08aet	0–09	Liverpool John Moores	
2010-11	Liverpool John Moores	0–09	0–08	Edinburgh Napier	
2009-10	Edinburgh Napier	0–11	1–05	Liverpool Hope	
2008-09	Liverpool John Moores	0–10	0–05	Edinburgh Napier	
2007-08	Liverpool John Moores	1–13	0–07	Edinburgh Napier	
2006-07	Liverpool John Moores	1–15	2–05	Edinburgh Napier	
2005-06	Liverpool John Moores	0–07	0–05	Liverpool Hope	
2004-05	St Mary's	1–03	0–05	Liverpool John Moores	
2003-04	St Mary's	1–08	0–10	Liverpool Hope	
2002-03	St Mary's				
2001-02	St Mary's	1-13aet	1-08	Liverpool John Moores	
2000-01	Abertay	1-09	1-08	Brunel	
1999-00	St Mary's			Abertay	
1998-99	Liverpool John Moores			Abertay	
1997-98	St Mary's			Liverpool John Moores	
1996-97	St Mary's			Aberdeen	
1995-96	Liverpool John Moores			St Mary's	
1994-95	Luton			Newcastle	
1993-94	Dundee				
1992-93	Swansea				
1991-92	St Mary's				
1990-91	Crewe & Alsager				

=== BUGAA Division 2 Championship ===
The Division 2 Championships take place on the same weekend as Division 1. The 2025/26 tournament took place at Hough End in Manchester.

Year	Winners	Score		Runners-up	Source
2025-26	Edge Hill	1-08	0-02	Robert Gordon	
2024-25	Manchester	1-06	0-01	Stirling	
2023-24	Heriot-Watt			Dundee	
2022-23	Manchester	1-09	0-06	Dundee	
2021-22	Liverpool	4-05	0-02	Dundee	
2020-21	cancelled due to COVID-19				
2019-20	Liverpool	3–10	0–10	Dundee	
2018-19	Manchester	0-08	1-04	Liverpool	
2017-18	Glasgow Caledonian	2–11	2-04	Manchester	
2016-17	Liverpool	6-08	1-02	Birmingham	
2015-16	Bangor	4–09		Robert Gordon	
2014-15	Heriot-Watt	3–10	1-09	Glasgow Caledonian	
2013-14	Robert Gordon	5–12	0–11	Cardiff	
2012-13	New York Colleges	1–10	1-05	Aberdeen	
2011-12	Glasgow	3–06	1–09	Liverpool John Moores (2s)	
2010-11	Bangor	0–04	0–03	Liverpool John Moores (2s)	
2009-10	Edinburgh	3–17	0–06	Liverpool	
2008-09	Liverpool John Moores (2s)			UCLAN	
2007-08	UCLAN	1–13	0–11	Chester	
2006-07	Sunderland	2–13	1–03	UCLAN	
2005-06	UCLAN	3–09	0–10	Glasgow	
2004-05	Glamorgan	2–04	1–01	Bangor	
2003-04	Bangor			Glasgow	
2002-03	Bolton			Aberdeen	
2001-02	Glamorgan	1-08	0-03	Bolton	
2000-01	St Mary's (2s)	0-08		Teesside	
1999-00	UCLAN				

=== BUGAA Division 3 Championship ===
The Division 3 Championships take place at the same time as Division 2, with the 2025/26 tournament also at Hough End in Manchester.

Year	Winners	Score		Runners-up	Source
2025-26	St Mary's	2-00	0-02	Stirling	
2024-25	unknown				
2023-24	unknown				
2022-23	unknown				
2021-22	unknown				
2020-21	unknown				
2019-20	unknown				
2018-19	unknown				
2017-18	Loughborough	3-07	0-01	Birmingham (2s)	
2016-17	Kingston	2-06aet	2-05	Birmingham (2s)	
2015-16	unknown				
2014-15	unknown				
2013-14	Birmingham	8–05	2–07	Liverpool	
2012-13	Birmingham	7–09	0–05	Sunderland	
2011-12	Teesside	7–09	1–01	Sunderland	
2010-11	Glasgow	1–06	1–05	Teesside	
2009-10	UEL	5–12	1–03	Sunderland	
2008-09	Sheffield Hallam / Sheffield			New York Colleges	
2007-08	Manchester Metropolitan / Salford	2–14	1–10	Teesside	
2006-07	Chester	3–17	0–04	Huddersfield	
2005-06	Sunderland	2–07	0–07	Chester	
2004-05	Leeds	3–05	1–05	Brighton	
2003-04	Aberdeen			Chester	
2002-03	Glamorgan	1-08	0-03	Bolton	

== All-Stars ==
From 2004 to 2008 the BUGAA announced an All-Star team of the best players from the season.

=== 2004 All-Stars ===
No.	Player	Position	Club
1	Billy Molloy	Goalkeeper	St Mary's
2	Patrick Regan	Right corner back	Heriot-Watt
3	Colm MacPhilib	Full back	Liverpool Hope
4	Tim Foley	Left corner back	Glamorgan
5	James Nugent	Right half back	Robert Gordon
6	Dermot Higgins	Centre back	Glamorgan
7	Martin Gill	Left half back	St Mary's
8	Rory Hannick	Midfield	Aberdeen
9	Paul Rouse	Midfield	St Mary's
10	Brian Lenahan	Right half forward	Liverpool Hope
11	Brendan Skelly	Centre forward	Dundee
12	Darren McAuley	Left half forward	Liverpool Hope
13	Ciaran Slane	Right corner forward	St Mary's
14	Rory Wolfe	Full forward	Aberdeen
15	Brian Kelly	Left corner forward	Glamorgan

=== 2005 All-Stars ===
No.	Player	Position	Club
	Fergal McArdle		St Mary's
	Billy Molloy		St Mary's
	Anton Moran		St Mary's
	Paul Rouse		St Mary's
	Ciaran Slane		St Mary's
	Barry Solan		St Mary's
	Shane McCann		Liverpool John Moores
	Conal McElholm		Liverpool John Moores
	Frank McKeever		Liverpool John Moores
	Trevor Meegan		Liverpool John Moores
	Martin Walsh		Liverpool John Moores

No.	Player	Position	Club
	Conor Fitzgerald		Dundee
	Robbie Mayon		Dundee
	Alan O'Donnell		Dundee
	Brendan Skelly		Dundee
	Paul Divine		Liverpool Hope
	Patrick Traynor		Liverpool Hope
	John Monaghan		Liverpool Hope
	Jude McIntyre		Robert Gordon
	Paddy Mulligan		Robert Gordon
	Rory Hannick		Aberdeen
	Kevin Dolan		Leeds

=== 2006 All-Stars ===
No.	Player	Position	Club
	Matty Deaney	Goalkeeper	Liverpool Hope
	Aaron Douglas	Corner back	Liverpool Hope
	Carlo Rooney	Midfield	Liverpool Hope
	James Murray	Half forward	Liverpool Hope
	Colm McFadden	Centre forward	Liverpool Hope
	Andy Smith	Goalkeeper	Robert Gordon
	Niall Burns	Half back	Robert Gordon
	Paddy Mulligan	Forward	Robert Gordon
	Adrian Weir	Centre back	Edinburgh Napier
	Morgan O'Flagherty	Corner forward	Edinburgh Napier
	Dave McAuley	Corner back	Huddersfield

No.	Player	Position	Club
	David O'Connor	Corner back	Liverpool John Moores
	John Devine	Midfield	Liverpool John Moores
	Trevor Meegan	Half back	Liverpool John Moores
	Garry Traynor	Half forward	Liverpool John Moores
	Pauric Finnegan	Full forward	Liverpool John Moores
	Ferghal McArdle	Corner back	St Mary's
	Charlie Harrison	Half back	St Mary's
	Jonathon McLaughlin	Forward	St Mary's
	Ryan McCloskey	Centre back	Newcastle
	Brendan Skelly	Forward	Dundee
	Mark Counihan	Corner forward	UCLAN

=== 2007 All-Stars ===
No.	Player	Position	Club
	Ciaran Connolly		Liverpool John Moores
	Dan Lynch		Liverpool John Moores
	Trevor Meegan		Liverpool John Moores
	Paul Devine		Liverpool John Moores
	Paul Carvil		Liverpool John Moores
	Paudi Finnegan		Liverpool John Moores
	Mark Counihan		Liverpool John Moores
	Mattie Deany		Liverpool Hope
	Peter Witherow		Liverpool Hope
	James Murray		Liverpool Hope
	Peter McClenaghan		Liverpool Hope
	Philip Beausang		Edinburgh

No.	Player	Position	Club
	Declan Peters		Edinburgh Napier
	Liam Diskin		Edinburgh Napier
	Mick Crowley		Edinburgh Napier
	Francis Markey		Edinburgh Napier
	Tommy Fitzpatrick		Edinburgh Napier
	Patrick Gallagher		Aberdeen
	Sean O'Murchu		Aberdeen
	Paddy Mulligan		Robert Gordon
	Niall Burns		Robert Gordon
	Gary Wallace		UCLAN
	Peter Turley		UCLAN

=== 2008 All-Stars ===
No.	Player	Position	Club
	Pauric Finnegan		Liverpool John Moores
	Ciaran Lynch		Liverpool John Moores
	Trevor Meegan		Liverpool John Moores
	Ross Connor		Liverpool John Moores
	Mick McCarthy		Liverpool John Moores
	Ciaran Connolly		Liverpool John Moores
	John O'Hagan		Liverpool Hope
	Simon McDonagh		Liverpool Hope
	Peter Witherow		Liverpool Hope
	Tommy Fitzpatrick		Edinburgh Napier
	Sean Cafferty		Edinburgh Napier
	Padraic Brennan		Edinburgh Napier

No.	Player	Position	Club
	Anthony Kelly		Dundee
	Eddie Egan		Dundee
	Barry Butler		Dundee
	Jonathan McLaughlin		St Mary's
	Killian Phair		St Mary's
	Paul Malone		St Mary's
	Neil Stack		Aberdeen
	Mikie Barry		Aberdeen
	Niall Burns		Robert Gordon
	Andy Smith		Robert Gordon
	Frank Niblock		UCLAN

== See also ==
- British University Ladies' Gaelic Football Championship
- British University Hurling Championship
- Sigerson Cup
- All-Britain Football Championship
- All-Britain Club Football Championship
