= Queimada =

Queimada may refer to:

== Places ==
- Queimada, Cape Verde, a village in the northwest-central part of São Nicolau Island
- Ilha da Queimada Grande, an island in the State of São Paulo, Brazil
- Queimada, also called Serraria Island, an island in the State of Pará, Brazil
- Queimada (Armamar), a civil parish in the municipality of Armamar, Portugal

== Other ==
- Queimada (drink)
- Queimada, a Brazilian variation of dodgeball for the Prisonball ball game
- Queimada, 1969 film directed by Gillo Pontecorvo, also known as Burn!

== See also ==
- Queimados, a municipality in the State of Rio de Janeiro, Brazil
- Queimados River, a river in the State of Rio de Janeiro, Brazil
- Quemada, municipality in the province of Burgos, Autonomous community of Castile and León, Spain
