= British University Hurling Championship =

British University Hurling Championships
- Code: Hurling (Third Level Institutions)
- Founded: 2001/02
- Region: Britain (GAA)
- Trophy: Michael O'Leary Cup
- Title holders: Robert Gordon University (1st title)
- First winner: Abertay University
- Most titles: Edinburgh Napier University (8 titles)
- Official website: "British Universities GAA".

The British University Hurling Championship is an annual hurling competition held for universities in Great Britain. It is organised by the British Universities Gaelic Athletic Association (BUGAA); a branch of the Higher Education GAA committee overseeing Gaelic Games in universities across England, Wales, and Scotland. Unlike the British University Men's Gaelic Football Championship, this competition is not overseen by the British Universities and Colleges Sport (BUCS). The trophies for British University Gaelic Games Championships memorialise students who were pioneers of Gaelic Games at British Universities. The Hurling Championship Trophy is known as the Michael O'Leary Cup, after a founder member of the hurling club at the University of Glasgow who died in 2001.

== History ==
Cross-code hurling and shinty games between Irish and Scottish university teams go back a number of years, but British inter-varsity hurling took longer to get off the ground than Gaelic football, which held its first tournament in 1991. After an exhibition game played by Combined Universities selections of Ireland in 2000, in April 2002 the inaugural British University Hurling Championship took place at Pearse Park, Glasgow. The tournament involved 'regional' teams, with Abertay University as the sole single-university team. Abertay won the first title, beating a 'Scottish Select' team in the final, made up of players from Donegal, Cork, Galway, Kilkenny and Limerick.

From 2002/03 onwards the championship has been contested by single-university teams, and has been hosted in multiple venues across the UK, including Dawson Park in Dundee, Hough End in Manchester and Páirc na hÉireann in Solihull. Scottish universities have traditionally dominated the competition, reflecting the strong diaspora of Irish students at Scottish universities as well as the presence of shinty clubs and the cross-promotion between the two sports.

In 2003, the University of Dundee became the first British university to compete in the Fergal Maher Cup - the Division 3 championship in Ireland. In 2008, Edinburgh Napier University won the Fergal Maher Cup, becoming the first, and currently only, university outside of Ireland to win Irish hurling silverware by beating GMIT Letterfrack in the final. Edinburgh Napier won the tournament again in 2010, beating Dundalk IT.

== British University Hurling Championship Finals by year ==
Year	Winner	Score		Runner-up	Source
2015-16	Robert Gordon	2–08	0–13	Liverpool John Moores	
2014-15	Liverpool John Moores				
2013-14	Edinburgh Napier				
2012-13	Edinburgh Napier				
2011-12	Edinburgh Napier	4–20	0–07	Robert Gordon	
2010-11	Edinburgh Napier				
2009-10	Edinburgh Napier				
2008-09	Edinburgh Napier	1–07	0–03	Liverpool John Moores	
2007-08	Edinburgh Napier	0–14	1–01	Liverpool John Moores	
2006-07	Edinburgh Napier	1–04	0–01	Robert Gordon	
2005-06	Dundee	3–07	1–00	Robert Gordon	
2004-05	Glamorgan				
2003-04	Dundee				
2002-03	Dundee			Abertay	
2001-02	Abertay			Scottish Select	

_{1} Incorporated into the University of South Wales in 2013.

Roll of Honour

- 8 - Edinburgh Napier University
- 3 - University of Dundee
- 1 - Abertay University, University of South Wales, Liverpool John Moores University, Robert Gordon University

== See also ==
- British University Mens' Gaelic Football Championship
- British University Ladies' Gaelic Football Championship
