= British University Ladies' Gaelic Football Championship =

British football championship

British University Ladies' Gaelic Football Championships
- Current season or competition: 2025/26 British University Ladies' Gaelic Football Championships
- Code: Gaelic football (Third Level Institutions)
- Founded: 1997
- Region: Britain (GAA)
- Title holders: University of Liverpool (3rd title)
- Most titles: St Mary's University, Twickenham (11 titles)
- Official website: "British Universities GAA".

The British University Ladies' Gaelic Football Championships are a group of an annual Gaelic football tournaments held for universities in Great Britain. They are organised by the British Universities Gaelic Athletic Association (BUGAA); a branch of the Higher Education GAA committee overseeing Gaelic Games in universities across England, Wales, and Scotland; in tandem with the Ladies' Gaelic Football Association. Unlike the men's competition, it is not affiliated with British Universities and Colleges Sport (BUCS).

== History ==
The regions of British GAA

The first organised ladies' Gaelic football tournament was held in Dundee in 1997, with St Mary's winning the inaugural competition. St Mary's would go on to win the first 8 championship titles up until 2005, with Liverpool Hope University breaking their monopoly with a hat-trick of titles in 2006, 2007, and 2008.

Between 2001 and 2009, the British Division 1 championship winners entered the Lynch Cup - then the Division 2 championship for universities in Ireland - at the semi-final stage. While no British team won the competition during these years, St Mary's University, Twickenham made the Lynch Cup final twice in 2002 and 2005 (losing to Mary Immaculate College, Limerick and Trinity College, Dublin), while Liverpool Hope University made the Lynch Cup final 3 years in a row from 2006 to 2008, losing to Dublin City University, Dundalk Institute of Technology and University College Cork.

A reorganisation of HEC competitions in the 2009/10 season saw the Lynch Cup become the Division 3 championship in Ireland, and British teams represented in different Irish HEC competitions each year. In 2015, Liverpool Hope reached the final of the Moynihan Cup - then the Division 4 championship for universities in Ireland - losing to St Patrick's College, Drumcondra, and in 2026, Coventry University became the first British winners of an Irish HEC competition with victory over a team from DCU Dóchas Éireann in the Lagan Cup, the Division 6 championship.

== Format ==
Gaelic games in Britain are run by the Gaelic Games Council of Britain with university competitions organised by the British Universities Gaelic Athletic Association (BUGAA) in association with the Higher Education Committee of the Ladies' Gaelic Football Association.

Teams compete from September to February in regional leagues, split into Scotland, North-West England, and Midlands & Southern England. The top 5 teams across the leagues qualifying for the Division 1 Championship tournament in March. The qualifying teams play in a round-robin to decide the champion.

Teams that did not qualify for Division 1 drop into the Division 2 Championship. The teams compete in 3 groups of 4. The top 8 teams across the 3 groups compete in knockouts (via quarter finals, semi finals, and a final) for the Division 2 title, with the other 4 teams forming the Division 3 Championship.

== Teams ==
The Scottish teams
The Welsh teams
The Yorkshire and Warwickshire teams
The London teams
The Lancashire teams

The teams competing in the BUGAA divisions of ladies' Gaelic football, as of the 2026/27 season, are as follows:

Scottish League Tier 1	Northern League	Midlands & Southern League
University of Glasgow	Liverpool Hope University	Cardiff University
Heriot-Watt University	Liverpool John Moores University	Coventry University
Queen Margaret University	University of Liverpool	Harper Adams University
Robert Gordon University	University of Manchester	Loughborough University
Scottish League Tier 2		St Mary's University, Twickenham
University of Dundee		University of Birmingham
University of Edinburgh		University of Nottingham
Glasgow Caledonian University		
University of Stirling		

== BUGAA Championships rolls of honour ==
=== BUGAA Division 1 Championship ===
- 1998 St Mary's University, Twickenham
- 1999 St Mary's University, Twickenham
- 2000 St Mary's University, Twickenham
- 2001 St Mary's University, Twickenham
- 2002 St Mary's University, Twickenham
- 2003 St Mary's University, Twickenham
- 2004 St Mary's University, Twickenham
- 2005 St Mary's University, Twickenham
- 2006 Liverpool Hope University
- 2007 Liverpool Hope University
- 2008 Liverpool Hope University
- 2009 Queen Margaret University
- 2010 Robert Gordon University
- 2011 St Mary's University, Twickenham
- 2012 St Mary's University, Twickenham
- 2013 Robert Gordon University
- 2014 Robert Gordon University
- 2015 Liverpool Hope University
- 2016 Queen Margaret University
- 2017 St Mary's University, Twickenham
- 2018 Liverpool Hope University
- 2019 Liverpool John Moores University
- 2020 not played
- 2021 not played
- 2022 University of Liverpool
- 2023 University of Liverpool
- 2024 Coventry University
- 2025 Coventry University
- 2026 University of Liverpool

=== BUGAA Division 2 Championship ===
- 2004 University of Chester
- 2005 University of Chester
- 2006 University of Chester
- 2007 University of Glasgow
- 2008 University of Glasgow
- 2009
- 2010 Northumbria University
- 2011 Northumbria University
- 2012 University of Liverpool
- 2013 Glasgow Caledonian University
- 2014 University of Dundee
- 2015 Coventry University
- 2016 Glasgow Caledonian University
- 2017 University of Glasgow
- 2018 Coventry University
- 2019 University of Manchester
- 2020 not played
- 2021 not played
- 2022 Glasgow Caledonian University
- 2023 Glasgow Caledonian University
- 2024 Glasgow Caledonian University
- 2025 University of Glasgow
- 2026 Liverpool Hope University

=== BUGAA Division 3 Championship ===
- 2011 Manchester Metropolitan University
- 2012
- 2013 University of Glasgow
- 2014 University of Birmingham
- 2015 Teesside University
- 2016 University of Glasgow
- 2017 University of Manchester
- 2018 University of Manchester
- 2019 University of Stirling
- 2020 not played
- 2021 not played
- 2022 not played
- 2023 not played
- 2024 not played
- 2025 University of Edinburgh
- 2026 Glasgow Caledonian University

=== Winners by university ===
Rank	University	Division 1 wins	Division 2 wins	Division 3 wins
1st place, gold medalist(s)	St Mary's University, Twickenham	11	0	0
2nd place, silver medalist(s)	Liverpool Hope University	5	1	0
3rd place, bronze medalist(s)	University of Liverpool	3	1	0
4	Robert Gordon University	3	0	0
5	Coventry University	2	2	0
6	Queen Margaret University	2	0	0
7	Liverpool John Moores University	1	0	0
8	Glasgow Caledonian University	0	5	1
9	University of Glasgow	0	4	2
10	University of Chester	0	3	0
11	Northumbria University	0	2	0
12	University of Manchester	0	1	2
13	University of Dundee	0	1	0
=14	Manchester Metropolitan University	0	0	1
=14	Teesside University	0	0	1
=14	University of Birmingham	0	0	1
=14	University of Edinburgh	0	0	1
=14	University of Stirling	0	0	1

== BUGAA Championship finals ==
=== BUGAA Division 1 Championship ===
Year	Winner	Score		Runner-up	Source
2025-26	Liverpool	1-16	0-08	Coventry	
2024-25	Coventry	3-12	2-11	Liverpool	
2023-24	Coventry	4-15	1-09	Liverpool	
2022-23	Liverpool	9-14	5-04	Liverpool John Moores	
2021-22	Liverpool	4-10	3-11	Liverpool John Moores	
2020-21	cancelled due to COVID-19				
2019-20	cancelled due to COVID-19				
2018-19	Liverpool John Moores	2-09		Robert Gordon	
2017-18	Liverpool Hope	5-08	0-10	Liverpool John Moores	
2016-17	St Mary's	8-12	2-02	Liverpool Hope	
2015-16	Queen Margaret	2-13	2-05	St Mary's	
2014-15	Liverpool Hope	6-09	1-07	Queen Margaret	
2013-14	Robert Gordon	1-03	1-02	Liverpool John Moores	
2012-13	Robert Gordon	2-16	5-05	Queen Margaret	
2011-12	St Mary's	4-06	3-04	Robert Gordon	
2010-11	St Mary's	4-11	0-07	Liverpool Hope	
2009-10	Robert Gordon	0-04	0-02	St Mary's	
2008-09	Queen Margaret				
2007-08	Liverpool Hope	3-08	0-02	Robert Gordon	
2006-07	Liverpool Hope	3-07	1-12	St Mary's	
2005-06	Liverpool Hope	1-06	1-03	St Mary's	
2004-05	St Mary's	2-06	0-05	Liverpool Hope	
2003-04	St Mary's	2-04	1-06	Liverpool Hope	
2002-03	St Mary's				
2001-02	St Mary's				
2000-01	St Mary's				
1999-00	St Mary's				
1998-99	St Mary's				
1997-98	St Mary's				

=== BUGAA Division 2 Championship ===
Year	Winner	Score		Runner-up	Source
2025-26	Liverpool Hope	2-01	0-05	Manchester	
2024-25	Glasgow	0-08aet+25m kicks	1-04	Dundee	
2023-24	Glasgow Caledonian	2-14	3-01	Glasgow	
2022-23	Glasgow Caledonian	7-12	5-04	Manchester	
2021-22	Glasgow Caledonian	3-05	1-01	Manchester	
2020-21	cancelled due to COVID-19				
2019-20	cancelled due to COVID-19				
2018-19	Manchester			Glasgow Caledonian	
2017-18	Coventry	4-10	0-10	Glasgow	
2016-17	Glasgow	6-09	3-08	Birmingham	
2015-16	Glasgow Caledonian	4-05	1-02	Northumbria	
2014-15	Coventry	3-07	1-06	Birmingham	
2013-14	Dundee	1-04	2-00	Glasgow	
2012-13	Glasgow Caledonian	6-09	0-04	Dundee	
2011-12	Liverpool	3-12	1-08	Manchester Metropolitan	
2010-11	Northumbria	3-06	0-04	Liverpool	
2009-10	Northumbria				
2008-09					
2007-08	Glasgow	2-04	2-03	Chester	
2006-07	Glasgow	3-06	2-07	Chester	
2005-06	Chester	1-06	1-03	Leeds	
2004-05	Chester			Bangor	
2003-04	Chester	3-09	0-00	Teesside	

=== BUGAA Division 3 Championship ===
Year	Winner	Score		Runner-up	Source
2025-26	Glasgow Caledonian	1-04	1-03	Edinburgh	
2024-25	Edinburgh	1-04	1-00	Nottingham / Nottingham Trent	
2023-24	not played				
2022-23	not played				
2021-22	not played				
2020-21	not played				
2019-20	not played				
2018-19	Stirling				
2017-18	Manchester	4-07	1-01	Stirling	
2016-17	Manchester	4-09	0-06	Stirling	
2015-16	Glasgow				
2014-15	Teesside			Heriot-Watt	
2013-14	Birmingham	0-07	1-02 (AET)	Manchester Metropolitan	
2012-13	Glasgow	1-03	1-02	Birmingham	
2011-12					
2010-11	Manchester Metropolitan	1-03	0-02	UCLAN	
