= British Universities and Colleges Sport =

Governing body for university sport in the United Kingdom

- Jurisdiction: United Kingdom
- Membership: 160
- Abbreviation: BUCS
- Founded: 1919; 107 years ago (as the Inter-Varsity Athletics Board); 2008; 18 years ago (as BUCS)
- Affiliation: FISU
- Regional affiliation: EUSA
- Headquarters: 20–24 King's Bench Street; London; SE1 0QX; United Kingdom
- Replaced: British Universities Sports Association (BUSA); University College Sport (UCS)

Official website
- www.bucs.org.uk
- (United Kingdom)

British Universities and Colleges Sport (BUCS; /ˈbʌks/) is the governing body for sport in higher education in the United Kingdom. The FISU described it as "one of the most well rounded and developed university sport programmes in the world".

Founded in 2008, BUCS is responsible for organising 54 inter-university sports in the United Kingdom, as well as representative teams for the FISU World University Championships and the FISU World University Games. It is a membership organisation of over 160 universities and colleges, with over 6,000 teams competing across 850 national and regional leagues. More than 100,000 students compete in BUCS competitions and events each year and more than 400 qualified for the FISU World University Games in 2025. Anne, Princess Royal, is the patron of BUCS.

Loughborough is the most successful university in the history of BUCS, leading the points table in each of its 14 seasons held since 2008–09; Bath, Leeds Beckett, (Note: Known at the time as Leeds Metropolitan University.) Birmingham, Durham, and Nottingham have all finished as runners-up. The 2019–20 season was suspended and voided due to the COVID-19 pandemic, and the 2020–21 season was cancelled.

== History ==
=== Background (1827–1919) ===
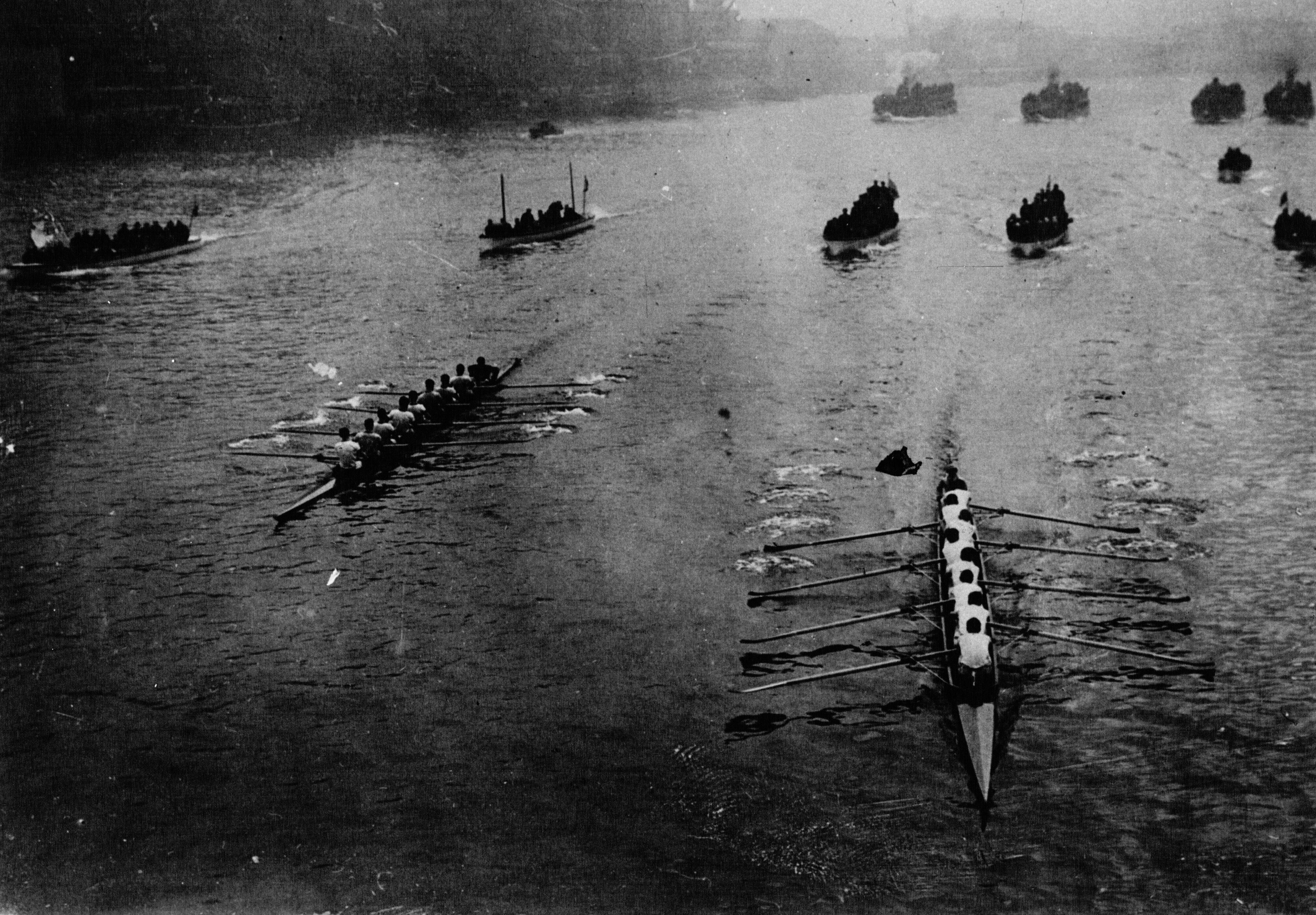
The first governing body for university sport was established in 1919, although varsity matches—such as the Boat Race (pictured in 1932)—date back to 1827.

Varsity matches between universities in the United Kingdom—particularly between Cambridge and Oxford—date back to the inaugural University Match in cricket in 1827 and the first Boat Race in 1829, which arose from their associations with public schools. The first modern athletics clubs in the world were founded at Cambridge in 1857, followed by Oxford in 1860; they organised the first Inter-'Varsity Sports, also called The Cambridge and Oxford Athletic Games, from 1864 onwards. The Scottish Varsity match in rugby union between St Andrews and Edinburgh is the oldest varsity match in the world in a code of football, having been first played in the 1860s. (Note: The Oxford–Cambridge varsity matches in rugby union and association football were first held in 1872 and 1874, respectively; the first intercollegiate football game in the United States was held in 1869.) The Oxford vs Cambridge women's University Match in (field) hockey was first played in 1895, the oldest women's varsity match in the world.

=== Governing bodies for university and college sport (1919–2008) ===
By 1918, students' union presidents nationwide expressed the need to have an association to promote sport at universities across the country. The Inter-Varsity Athletics Board of England and Wales (IVAB) was established in 1919 and organised the first inter-varsity track and field meeting that year at Manchester, which was attended by nine of the 11 founding members. (Note: The 11 founding members of inter-varsity sport were Aberystwyth, Bangor, Birmingham, Bristol, Cardiff, Durham, Leeds, Liverpool, Manchester, Nottingham, and Sheffield.) Manchester invited women's teams to compete against them in 1921, which initiated women's inter-varsity competition. Birmingham hosted the first Inter-Varsity Athletic Board Women's Championships in 1922 and the Women's Inter-Varsity Athletics Board (WIVAB) was formed in 1923.

In 1930, the Universities Athletics Union (UAU) was formed, which incorporated the IVAB. The British Universities Sports Board (BUSB) was formed in 1952 to enable students to compete at an international level, such as the World Student Games (the forerunner of the FISU World University Games) and other international events. BUSB was replaced by the British Universities Sports Federation (BUSF) in 1962.

From 1969, the British Polytechnics Sports Association (BPSA) represented polytechnics and, from 1970, colleges of higher education were represented by the British Colleges Sports Association (BCSA). The following year, the British Students Sports Federation (BSSF) formed to represent students at polytechnics and colleges of higher education competing in international competitions. In 1979, the WIVAB in England and Wales merged into the UAU, which began to represent women as well as men.

During the early 1980s, central-government funding for sport in higher education became more limited and, in the face of funding constraints, the various student sporting bodies increased their cooperation. The BUSF, the BSSF and UAU shared offices in Woburn Square in London and from 1990, the BPSA, the BCSA, BSSF and BUSF shared premises in Birmingham. In 1992, it was decided that a unified body representing and organising student sport was necessary and would be beneficial. It was proposed that by 1995 the UAU and the BUSF would amalgamate and form the British Universities Sports Association (BUSA). At the same time, the structure of higher education in the United Kingdom changed in 1992 when polytechnics and colleges of higher education were upgraded to university status. All institutions of higher education were eligible for election to membership of BUSA and as a result both the BPSA and the BCSA were dissolved, and their members applied for membership with BUSA.

==== Physical education staff at universities and colleges ====
The Universities Physical Education Association (UPEA) was introduced in 1960 as an association for staff responsible for sport at universities. The UPEA became the British Universities Physical Education Association (BUPEA) in 1972. BUEPA merged with the Association of Polytechnic Physical Education Lecturers (APPEL) in 1993 become the British Universities and Colleges Physical Education Association (BUCPEA). In 2000, BUCPEA became University and College Sport (UCS).

=== BUCS (2008–present) ===
BUCS was formed on 16 June 2008 through the merger of British Universities Sports Association (BUSA) and University College Sport (UCS), continuing to represent both competitive sport at universities and colleges as well as the professional staff working in the sector. In addition to elite-level competition, BUCS focuses on enhancing the student experience through sport with a focus on accessibility. The FISU has described it as "one of the most well rounded and developed university sport programmes in the world".

The BUCS Football League is the association football league system of universities in the UK. It is the largest sport in higher education in the UK, with over 500 men's and women's teams competing in 100 leagues.

Beginning in 2016, BUCS Super Rugby was founded as the top competition for men's university-level rugby union in the United Kingdom, featuring the top-10 universities that compete in BUCS divisions; the women's division was founded in 2024.

Several universities that were original members of the IVAB celebrated 100 years of inter-varsity competition in the UK in 2019.

An American football league was formed in November 2024 as a merger with the British Universities American Football League.

Loughborough University hosted the 'Big Wednesday' from 2024 through to 2026. In 2025, 2,000 student-athletes, coaches, and support staff were involved in 57 championship, trophy and vase finals across 16 different sports. Around 2,500 spectators watched the event and 13 finals streamed live on YouTube.

BUCS collaborated with U Sports, the governing body for university sport in Canada, to host the first Canada–Great Britain dual meet in swimming in July 2025.

== Sports ==
As of 2025, BUCS organise competition across 54 sports. The BUCS season traditionally begins in October and ends in July.

Sport	Competition(s)	Champions		
Sport	Competition(s)	Men's	Women's	Mixed
American football	British Universities American Football League			West of England (172)
Archery	BUCS Archery Indoor Championships; BUCS Archery Outdoor Championships	Nottingham (55)	Nottingham (64)	
Athletics	BUCS Athletics Indoor Championships; BUCS Athletics Outdoor Championships	Loughborough (420)	Loughborough (488)	
Badminton	BUCS Badminton Individual Championships	Loughborough (271)	Nottingham (221)	Edinburgh (120)
Baseball and softball	BUCS National Baseball Championship; BUCS National Softball Championship			Loughborough (215)
Basketball	BUCS Basketball League	Loughborough (169)	Loughborough (159)	
Boxing	BUCS Boxing Championships	Loughborough (28)	Northumbria (20)	
Canoeing	BUCS Canoe Championships	Nottingham (242)	Nottingham (114)	Nottingham (192)
Clay pigeon shooting	BUCS Clay Pigeon Shooting Championships	Oxford Brookes (46)	Harper Adams (32)	
Climbing	BUCS Climbing Championships	Sheffield Hallam (28)	Sheffield (28)	
Cricket	BUCS Cricket Indoor Championships; BUCS Cricket Outdoor Championships	Loughborough (255)	Loughborough (180)	
Cycling	BUCS Cycling Championships	Loughborough (316)	Loughborough (129)	Cambridge (20)
Dodgeball	BUCS Dodgeball League	Imperial (125)	Sheffield (110)	
Equestrian	BUCS Equestrian Championships			Loughborough (54)
Fencing	BUCS Fencing Championships	Durham (219)	Edinburgh (162)	
Football	BUCS Football League	Hartpury; Loughborough (201)	Loughborough (183)	
Futsal	BUCS Futsal League	Loughborough (176)	Nottingham (162)	
Gaelic football	British University Gaelic Football Championship; British University Ladies' Gaelic Football Championship	Liverpool John Moores; Liverpool (30); Nottingham Trent (30); Robert Gordon (30)	Liverpool	
Golf	BUCS Golf Tour	Stirling (20)	Stirling (24)	Exeter (268)
Gymnastics	BUCS Gymnastics Championships	Leeds Beckett (32)	Loughborough (36)	
Handball	BUCS Handball League	Oxford (50)	Loughborough (61)	
Hockey	BUCS Hockey Championships	Nottingham (338)	Exeter (320)	
Jiu jitsu	Jiu Jitsu Atemi National Championships	Sheffield (14 2/3); Edinburgh (14 2/3); Bristol (14 2/3)	Edinburgh (22)	
Judo	BUCS Judo Championships	Bath (65)	Cardiff Met (38)	
Karate	BUCS Karate Championships	Nottingham (63)	Loughborough (53)	Nottingham (32)
Korfball	British Student Korfball Nationals			Loughborough; Exeter (57)
Lacrosse	BUCS Lacrosse Championships	Nottingham (205)	Nottingham (297)	
Modern biathlon and pentathlon	BUCS Modern Biathlon and Pentathlon	Loughborough (32)	Loughborough (44)	Cambridge (20)
Netball	BUCS Netball League		Loughborough (219)	
Orienteering	BUCS Orienteering Championships	Edinburgh (56)	Edinburgh (58)	
Pool and snooker	BUCS 8-Ball Pool Championships; BUCS 9-Ball Pool Championships; BUCS Snooker Championships	Derby (62)	Lancaster (65)	Manchester (103)
Powerlifting	BUCS Powerlifting Championships	Loughborough (84)	Loughborough (88)	Loughborough (20)
Rifle	BUCS Rifle Championships	Exeter (18)	Cambridge (24); Edinburgh (24)	St Andrews (42)
Rounders	BUCS Rounders National Championship			
Rowing	BUCS Rowing Championships; BUCS Regatta	Durham (138)	Durham (170)	
Rugby league	University and College Rugby League	Northumbria (220)		
Rugby union	BUCS Super Rugby	Loughborough; Exeter (337.5)	Hartpury; Loughborough (272)	
Sailing	BUCS Sailing Championships			Southampton (199)
Snowsports	British Universities Indoor Snowsports Championships	Glasgow (108)	Aberdeen (60)	Loughborough (48)
Squash	BUCS Squash Individual Championships	Nottingham (219)	Birmingham (187)	
Surfing	BUCS Surfing Championships	Falmouth (40)	Exeter (28)	
Swimming	BUCS Swimming Championships	Loughborough (506)	Loughborough (610)	Loughborough (124)
Table tennis	BUCS Table Tennis Individual Championships	Nottingham (276)	Nottingham (313)	Nottingham (30)
Taekwondo	BSTF National Taekwondo Championships	Nottingham (40)	UCL (56); Loughborough (56)	UCL (20)
Tennis	BUCS Tennis Championships	Nottingham (371)	Nottingham (312)	
Touch rugby	BUCS Touch Rugby National Championships			Exeter (50)
Trampoline	BUCS Trampoline and Double Mini-Trampoline Championships	Birmingham (32)	Birmingham (20)	
Triathlon	BUCS Triathlon Championships	Loughborough (28)	Loughborough (70)	Loughborough (78)
Ultimate	BUCS Ultimate Indoor National Championships	Bath (154)	St Andrews (131)	
Volleyball	BUCS Beach Volleyball Championships	Nottingham (208)	Durham (272)	
Water polo	BUCS Water Polo Championships	Durham (169)	Durham (158)	
Weightlifting	BUCS Weightlifting and Para Powerlifting Championships			
Wheelchair basketball	BUCS Wheelchair Basketball Championships			Worcester (80)
Windsurfing	BUCS Windsurfing Championships	Warwick (12)	Exeter (12)	Swansea (32)
Sport	Competition(s)	Men's	Women's	Mixed
Sport	Competition(s)	Champions		

=== Non-BUCS sports ===
Certain university and college sports are not governed by BUCS for various reasons. The following is a partial list of these sports and respective competitions:

Sport	Competition(s)	Governing body	Champions		
Sport	Competition(s)	Governing body	Men's	Women's	Mixed
Darts	UDUK Nationals	University Darts UK		Lancaster	Leeds
Hurling	British University Hurling Championship	Higher Education GAA	Liverpool John Moores	Coventry	
Ice hockey	BUIHA National Championships	BUIHA	Oxford	Oxford	
Kart racing	British Universities Karting Championship	Motorsport UK			Southampton
Underwater hockey	BOA Student Nationals	BOA			London
Benchball	Varsity	Self-organised			Exeter

== Competitions and events ==
Over the year, BUCS runs over 120 events for both individual and team sports. Team sports compete in BUCS leagues, with the majority of league fixtures taking place on Wednesday afternoons, which is commonly referred to as BUCS Wednesday. Wednesday afternoons are generally free from lectures to allow students to compete in sport. There are 850 leagues, with institutions across the country competing against each other to avoid relegation or win the league and gain promotion to higher leagues.

=== BUCS Big Wednesday ===
The finals of the Championship and Trophy are played at BUCS Big Wednesday. This annual single-day event showcases the Championship and Trophy finals across 16 league sports. As of 2023, Big Wednesday will take place at Loughborough University.

=== BUCS Nationals ===
BUCS Nationals is an annual multisport event that takes place across three days. As of 2025, indoor athletics, swimming, badminton, climbing, fencing and karate are the sports represented at BUCS Nationals. The event is held in Sheffield.

=== BUCS Conference Finals ===
The BUCS Conference Finals are regional finals for the conference knock-out competitions (Conference Cup, Conference Trophy and Conference Shield) based on the five BUCS regions. As of 2026, these feature 288 teams across 144 regional competitions in 16 sports, with over 3,200 participants. As of 2026, the hosts for the regional finals are:

- Midlands – University of Warwick and Coventry University
- Northern – Durham University
- Scottish – University of St Andrews
- South Eastern – University of Surrey
- Western – Cardiff University

== BUCS Points ==
BUCS Points are awarded to institutions based on their finishing positions in leagues and events under the BUCS marquee. The accumulation of these points determines the overall BUCS champion.

Loughborough University have topped the overall BUCS standings in each of the 15 editions since its founding—including its predecessors, Loughborough have won 44 consecutive national championships. As of 2025, no university has scored within 1,000 points of Loughborough in the overall standings.

Both the 2019–20 and 2020–21 seasons were cancelled due to the COVID-19 pandemic in the United Kingdom.

=== By year ===
Season	Champions	Points	Runners-up	Margin	Third place	Fourth place	Fifth place	Results
2008–09	Loughborough	5,512	Bath	2,459.5 (44.62%)	Leeds Beckett	Birmingham	Edinburgh	Results
2009–10	Loughborough	5,585.5	Leeds Beckett	2,213 (39.62%)	Birmingham	Bath	Edinburgh	Results
2010–11	Loughborough	5,342	Birmingham	2,357.5 (44.13%)	Leeds Beckett	Durham	Bath	Results
2011–12	Loughborough	5,133.4	Durham	1,648.9 (32.12%)	Birmingham	Bath	Leeds Beckett	Results
2012–13	Loughborough	5,473	Durham	2,055 (37.55%)	Birmingham	Bath	Exeter	Results
2013–14	Loughborough	5,331	Durham	1,765.5 (33.12%)	Birmingham	Bath	Edinburgh	Results
2014–15	Loughborough	5,876.2	Durham	1,783.5 (30.35%)	Edinburgh	Bath	Birmingham	Results
2015–16	Loughborough	5,773	Durham	1,692.5 (29.32%)	Edinburgh	Nottingham	Exeter	Results
2016–17	Loughborough	6,498	Durham	1,683 (25.90%)	Edinburgh	Nottingham	Exeter	Results
2017–18	Loughborough	6,230.7	Durham	1,209.7 (19.42%)	Edinburgh	Nottingham	Bath	Results
2018–19	Loughborough	6,157.7	Nottingham	1,038.2 (16.86%)	Durham	Edinburgh	Exeter	Results
2019–20	Season suspended and voided due to the COVID-19 pandemic†							
2020–21	Not held due to the COVID-19 pandemic							
2021–22	Loughborough	8,034.1	Nottingham	1,582.6 (19.70%)	Durham	Edinburgh	Exeter	Results
2022–23	Loughborough	9,341.5	Nottingham	1,426 (15.27%)	Durham	Exeter	Edinburgh	Results
2023–24	Loughborough	9,492	Nottingham	1,265 (13.33%)	Durham	Exeter	Edinburgh	Results
2024–25	Loughborough	9,872	Nottingham	1,065 (10.79%)	Durham	Exeter	Edinburgh	Results
Season	Champions	Points	Runners-up	Margin	Third place	Fourth place	Fifth place	Results

^{†} Prior to being voided, the University of Nottingham led the points standings with 4,723 points, 186.5 ahead of Loughborough University.

=== By university ===
University	Titles	Runners-up	Top-5
Loughborough	15	0	15
Durham	0	7	13
Nottingham	0	5	8
Bath	0	1	8
Birmingham	0	1	7
Leeds Beckett	0	1	4
Edinburgh	0	0	12
Exeter	0	0	8

== International representation ==
Members of both FISU (International University Sport Federations) and EUSA (European University Sports Association), BUCS is responsible for sending a cohort of students to international events including the World University Summer & Winter Games and the European Universities Games. The British international team goes by the name of GB Students.

== National governing body involvement ==
BUCS applies for annual funding from Sport England to support the delivery of student sport across the country. They also work with national governing bodies to develop sports within the student sector and some posts within BUCS are funded by such bodies, with the aim of developing specific student sports.

=== Partnership with the Football Association (2016–present) ===
The Football Association (FA) fund projects and positions within BUCS to help develop grassroots football. With their investment, BUCS set up 167 FA Grassroot Hubs to support football and futsal in the higher education sector, benefiting over 250 thousand participants.

BUCS also collaborated with the FA to create the Women's Leadership Programme, providing female students with important skills and qualities to help them in their future careers. The first cohort of leaders graduated in 2020.

== Board ==
The BUCS Board is composed of the chair, five independent directors, and four BUCS directors—two representing students and two representing the staff of the membership.

Chair of the Board: Vacant

Commercial Director and Senior Independent Director: Russell James

Sport and Competition Director: Katy Storie

Finance Director: Simon Wilson

EDIA Director: Vacant

Legal and Governance Director: Carrie Stephenson

Chair of BUCS Senior Managers Executive: Cathy Gallagher

Chair of BUCS Advisory Group: Chris Anthony

Student Director: Ella Williams

Student Director, Welfare Lead: George Christian

== Hall of Fame ==
In 2019, BUCS introduced the Hall of Fame to celebrate the centenary of university sport in the United Kingdom. The Hall of Fame acknowledges individual dedication to and achievements in sport.

As of 2024, 18 athletes have been inducted into the BUCS Hall of Fame.

Inductee	University	Sport(s)	Season(s)	BUCS	Notes
(England) Alison Odell CBE	Birmingham; Leicester	Administrator			
(Wales) Alun Wyn Jones OBE	Swansea	Rugby union			
(England) Bill Slater CBE	Birmingham	Football			
(Scotland) Catriona Matthew OBE	Stirling	Golf			
(England) Christine Ohuruogu MBE	UCL	Athletics			
(England) Dame Jessica Ennis-Hill DBE	Sheffield	Athletics			
(Scotland) Dame Katherine Grainger DBE	Edinburgh	Rowing			
(England) Danielle Brown MBE	Leicester	Archery			
(Scotland) David Florence	Nottingham	Canoeing			
(China) Deng Yaping	Nottingham	Table tennis			
(Scotland) Eric Liddell	Edinburgh	Athletics; Rugby union			
(England) Jonathan Edwards CBE	Durham	Athletics			
(England) Lauren Steadman MBE	Portsmouth	Swimming; Paratriathlon			
(Wales) Liz Nicholl CBE	Nottingham	Netball			
(England) Rebecca Romero MBE	St Mary's	Rowing; Cycling			
(Wales) Sir Gareth Edwards CBE	Cardiff Met	Rugby union			
(England) Sir Roger Bannister CH CBE	Oxford	Athletics			
(Wales) Sophie Ingle OBE	Cardiff Met	Football			

== See also ==
- Armorial of British universities
- International University Sports Federation
- Intramural sport
- List of British and Irish varsity matches
- National Collegiate Athletic Association (United States)
- New Zealand University Games
- Scottish Universities Sport
- Student Sport Ireland
- U Sports (Canada)
- UniSport (Australia)
- Universities in the United Kingdom
