= 2015 GAA Interprovincial Championships =

2015 GAA season
- Football Champions: N/A
- Hurling Champions: N/A

The 2015 GAA Interprovincial Championships (known also as the Railway Cup) was a senior GAA competition in which all 4 provinces of Ireland were due to compete in Gaelic football and hurling tournaments. The provincial squads are made up of players from county panels in each respective province. Due to adverse weather conditions, the 2015 inter-provincials did not take place.

Connacht were the reigning football champions whilst Leinster were the reigning hurling champions.

== Football championship ==
=== Fixtures ===
Semi-finals
5 December - Páirc Esler
Munster
Leinster
5 December - Athletic Grounds
Ulster
Connacht

Final
6 December - Athletic Grounds

==== Semi-finals ====
5 December 2015
16:00
Semi-final

Munster	v	Leinster

Páirc Esler, Newry
Referee: Ciaran Branagan
5 December 2015
19:00
Semi-final

Ulster	v	Connacht

Athletic Grounds, Armagh
Referee: Eddie Kinsella

==== Final ====
6 December 2015
14:30
Final

Winner Munster/Leinster	v	Winner Ulster/Connacht

Athletic Grounds, Armagh
Referee: TBC

== Hurling championship ==
=== Fixtures ===
Semi-finals
5 December - Pearse Stadium
Munster
Leinster
5 December - Pearse Stadium
Ulster
Connacht

Final
6 December - Pearse Stadium

==== Semi-finals ====
5 December 2015
12:30
Semi-final

Ulster	v	Connacht

Pearse Stadium, Galway
Referee: Cathal Mc Allister
5 December 2015
14:00
Semi-final

Munster	v	Leinster

Pearse Stadium, Galway
Referee: John Keane

==== Final ====
6 December 2015
13:30
Final

Winner Munster/Leinster	v	Winner Ulster/Connacht

Pearse Stadium, Galway
Referee: TBC
