= UEL Black Bulls =

- Tairbh Dubha Ollscoile Londan Thiar
- Founded: 2007
- County: London
- Nickname: The Black Bulls
- Colours: Black
- Grounds: Goodmayes
{{{kit1}}}

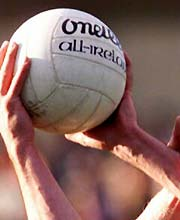

The University of East London Black Bulls are a Gaelic Athletic Association club based in East London, England. The club was founded in 2007 and is primarily concerned with the game of Gaelic football.

== History ==
The UEL Black Bulls were founded in 2007 following a meeting with the Universities' Sports and Social club. It was the first Gaelic Football club to represent the University of East London. Within a month, the new club had made their mark defeating the university of Worcester in Oxford. Unfortunately, the hosts had inflicted the fledgling club's first defeat just hours earlier.

The nickname 'Black Bulls' derives from a local Irish-owned hostelry in the Stratford area of London that provided sponsorship for the club.

== See also ==
- British University Gaelic football Championship
