= British Student Taekwondo Federation =

National student sport federation in the UK

BSTF
- Founded: 1986
- Based: United Kingdom
- Website: http://bstf.org.uk/

The British Student Taekwondo Federation (BSTF) is a national student sport federation and registered charity.

The organisation was founded in 1986 and provides services and events to university Taekwondo clubs across the United Kingdom including the multi-discipline Student Taekwondo Championships Series tournament programme. In 2019 the charity partnered with British Universities and Colleges Sport (BUCS), the governing body for university sport in the United Kingdom, to deliver the new BSTF BUCS Student Taekwondo Championships Series joining over 30,000 student-athletes across more than 50 sports within the BUCS core competition programme.

The charity also delivers training camps; referee training courses; British Universities and Colleges Sport (BUCS) qualification tournaments and team management of the European Universities Games and Championships squads; an inter-university composite national team training programme for performance student-athletes; BUCS London University Sports League tournaments; support for university clubs hosting their own training events and university open tournaments; award an annual Club of the Year Award, and provides advocacy and advice available to all university taekwondo clubs across the UK.

The charitable objects of the BSTF are: "the advancement for the public benefit of physical education among students in Universities and Colleges by the provision of services and promotion of the martial art and amateur sport of Taekwondo".

== History ==
The BSTF was established in 1986 as a not-for-profit organisation to facilitate university Taekwondo clubs to train and compete together. The present day BSTF BUCS Taekwondo Championships Series developed from these annual Student National Taekwondo Championships competitions, known colloquially by university taekwondo club members as "the Nationals"; The first Nationals were organised in 1987 and were held at the University of Southampton. The event began as a collaboration between students of Southampton and Warwick University's Taekwondo clubs, including one of the BSTF's founding members and current patron of the charity master Graham Jones. The inaugural championships included student teams from the University of Southampton, Southampton Technical College (now Southampton City College), Leeds University and Warwick University.

By 1989 the organisation had evolved into a constituted national organising committee to cater for the expanding event. The first Student National Taekwondo Championships included only the WTF rules sparring discipline, with ITF rules sparring added in 1992 and various individual, pairs and team patterns events being added over time. The most recent edition to the competition programme is the Freestyle Patterns discipline added to the Student National Taekwondo Championships event in 2017 as an additional qualification event for the European University Sports Association's European Universities Games and European Universities Championships Taekwondo programme.

After years of declining numbers and issues, the relationship between BSTF and BUCS ended in 2025. BSTF attempted to continue independently but after further declining numbers, officially announced its closure in September 2026

== Student National Taekwondo Championships ==
The Student National Taekwondo Championships Series comprises several multi-discipline tournaments each year, which the largest university Taekwondo events in Great Britain. The series typically attracts over 500 student athletes from over 50 universities across Great Britain taking part, with around 30 highest ranking athletes qualifying at the event to represent their institutions at the EUSA European Universities Games (in even years) and EUSA European Universities Championships (in odd years).

Five Taekwondo disciplines are contested at the annual Student National Taekwondo Championships, with competitors sub-grouped by grade (experience level) divisions and also by weight divisions for sparring disciplines. The events programme includes: ITF rules sparring; WT rules sparring; Chang-Hon patterns (individual, pair and team Tul); Kukkiwon patterns (individual, pair, and team Poomsae); and Freestyle patterns. BSTF competitions are contested according to the rules of the pertinent international federations, WT and the ITF.

Competitors accrue points for their registered institution for every single sparring match win / patterns round progressed at every event in the tournament series towards their institution's overall Student National Taekwondo Championships ranking at the end of the year. The table below shows the history of overall club champions based on overall team score.

Year	Host cities	Team champions	BUCS point champions
2023-24*	London, London, Nottingham	University College London	University of Nottingham
2022-23*	Nottingham, Southampton, Cardiff	University College London	University College London
2021-22*	London, Nottingham, Norwich	University College London	University of Bath
2020-21*	n/a	n/a	n/a
2019-20*	London, Nottingham, Colchester	University College London	University College London
2018-19*	London, Nottingham, Worcester	University College London	n/a
2017-18*	London, Nottingham, Worcester	University College London	n/a
2017	Worcester	University College London	n/a
2016	Worcester	Cardiff University	n/a
2015	Worcester	University of Southampton	n/a
2014	Bristol	University of Southampton	n/a
2013	Banbury	University of Southampton	n/a
2012	Nottingham	University of Southampton	n/a
2011	Aylesbury	University of Southampton	n/a
2010	Aylesbury	University of Southampton	n/a
2009	Durham	University of the West of England	n/a
2008	Nottingham	University of the West of England	n/a
2007	Bristol	University of the West of England	n/a
2006	Southampton	Newcastle University	n/a
2005	Leeds	Newcastle University	n/a
2004	Teesside	Newcastle University	n/a
2003	Cambridge	Bristol University	n/a
2002	Birmingham	Bristol University	n/a
2001	Birmingham	Bristol University	n/a
2000	Bristol	Bristol University	n/a
1999	Manchester	Lancaster University	n/a
1998	Warwick	University of Bradford	n/a
1997	Newcastle	Newcastle University	n/a
1996	Bournemouth	Newcastle University	n/a
1995	Coventry	Kingston University	n/a
1994	Nottingham	Kingston University	n/a
1993	Manchester	Newcastle University	n/a
1992	City of London	University of Southampton	n/a
1991	Sheffield	University of Manchester	n/a
1990	Lancaster	University of Manchester	n/a
1989	Warwick	Lancaster University	n/a
1988	University College London	Lancaster University	n/a
1987	Southampton	University of Southampton	n/a

(*)from 1986-2017 the Team Champion title was awarded based on overall team scores from all disciplines and divisions of a Student National Taekwondo Championships Finals event only, irrespective of other competition results, while from the 2017-18 season onward the title awarded based on overall team scores from all disciplines and divisions across the multi-event championships series. The BUCS (point) Champion title is awarded to the club with the highest total of BUCS points at the end of the season.
