= Benchball =

United Kingdom team sport

Benchball is a team sport played with the primary objective of scoring by passing the ball to a teammate standing on a bench. It is played informally in schools and semi-competitively in universities in the United Kingdom. The game lacks an agreed standard, and as such many varieties of the game are played but invariably include two teams playing on a court with benches placed at opposite ends where scoring involves passing a ball to a teammate on a bench.

Benchball, as a competitive activity, is a relatively recent development within United Kingdom universities. It is commonly used by physical education teachers as a method of introducing concepts of ball handling and spatial awareness. It has also been utilised in schools by PE teachers as a substitute activity during wet weather.

== Rule variations ==
The sport as commonly played in schools is typically communicated through word-of-mouth and so many different rulesets have all been called benchball. Some effort has been made in the university community to establish common rules to be used for national competitions. Each of these are played on (typically indoor) courts of variable dimensions.

=== Netball style ===
One of the five competitively viable versions of benchball, played by many university societies in the United Kingdom, adopts rules akin to netball. The court is set up with a single bench at each end, and two teams of eight players starting in opposite halves. One player from each team starts on the bench at the opposite end of the court to their team. The game starts with the ball thrown in the air between two players in the centre of the court who compete to knock it back to their teammates. Players can move anywhere on the court, but otherwise passing and moving rules remain the same as in netball, i.e. a player cannot move with the ball and must instead pass it down the court to their teammates. To score, a player must pass the ball to their teammate on the bench, and if successfully caught they join them in standing on the bench. The game is won when one team has scored 6 times, i.e. the entire team is on the bench except for one player.

Variants of this style are played with the scorer instead swapping with the player on the bench, such that there is only one player on each bench at a time, and deciding the winner by keeping score.

=== Dodgeball (Sheffield) style ===
The other benchball variant played competitively is more akin to dodgeball. It follows the same setup as the netball-style variant with teams of eight players starting in opposite halves, and one player per team starting on the opposite-end bench. This version though is played with multiple balls, which start distributed along the centre line of the court. Players start lined up at the back line in their half and then race to the middle to collect the balls. Players are free to move whilst holding the ball but must stay within their own half at all times. As in the netball-style rules, points are scored by passing a ball to a teammate on the bench, and after scoring the passing player joins the bench. The game is won once all players on one team are on the opposite bench.

=== Five-pass style ===
Also common in schools is a version of the game with passing and moving rules similar to netball, but requiring a team to make exactly five passes before passing to their teammate on the bench. After scoring a player either joins their teammate on the bench or swaps with them, depending on rules being played.

=== Rugby style ===
An alternate version exists, commonly used for training rugby players. It has the same court setup with two teams and one player for each on the opposite bench. In this version players can move with the ball and travel anywhere inside the court, but possession changes hands if the ball-carrier is touched by an apposing player. The ball-carrier can pass in any direction, but can only score by moving beyond the bench and passing backwards to the player on the bench.

== Benchball Varsity ==
From the mid-2010s onwards, benchball has been gaining popularity as a university sport in the United Kingdom. There is now an annual National Benchball Varsity tournament where active university benchball societies compete against each other in matches with both netball-style and dodgeball-style rules. The event is hosted and organised entirely by the societies, independent of the national BUCS competition. Current attendees include Birmingham, Exeter, Sheffield, Bournemouth and Chichester. Other Universities also have Benchball societies, including Lancaster.

Varsity Winners
Year	Winner	Host
2019	Birmingham	Birmingham
2020	Sheffield	Sheffield
2021	N/A (covid)	N/A (covid)
2022	Birmingham	Birmingham
2023	Exeter	Exeter
2024	Exeter	Birmingham
2025	Exeter	Bournemouth
2026	Exeter	Sheffield

=== Varsity Tournament 2019 ===
Participating Teams: Birmingham (2 teams), Exeter (2 teams), Sheffield (2 teams).

The inaugural Benchball Varsity Tournament in 2019 was hosted by Birmingham and won by Birmingham.

=== Varsity Tournament 2020 ===
Participating Teams: Birmingham (2 teams), Exeter (2 teams), Sheffield (2 teams).

The 2020 Benchball Varsity Tournament was hosted by Sheffield and won by Sheffield.

=== Varsity Tournament 2022 ===
Participating Teams: Birmingham (2 teams), Exeter (2 teams), Sheffield (2 teams), Bournemouth (1 team).

The 2022 Benchball Varsity Tournament was hosted by Birmingham and won by Birmingham.

=== Varsity Tournament 2023 ===
Participating Teams: Exeter (2 teams), Birmingham (2 teams), Sheffield (2 teams), Bournemouth (1 team).

The 2023 Benchball Varsity Tournament was hosted by Exeter and won by Exeter.

=== Varsity Tournament 2024 ===
Participating Teams: Exeter (2 teams), Birmingham (2 teams), Sheffield (2 teams), Bournemouth (2 teams), and Chichester (1 team).

The 2024 Benchball Varsity Tournament was hosted by Birmingham. The structure of the tournament was group stages followed by knockout rounds. Each team, except Chichester, entered one team into each of the two groups. The Semi-Finals consisted of Exeter A vs Birmingham B and Exeter B vs Birmingham A. Exeter won both games, leading to an all-Exeter final and an Exeter overall win.

=== Varsity Tournament 2025 ===
Participating Teams: Exeter (2 teams), Birmingham (2 teams), Bournemouth (2 teams), Sheffield (2 teams), and Chichester (1 team).

The 2025 Benchball Varsity Tournament was hosted by Bournemouth (with the tournament in Poole). The structure of the tournament was a double round robin, in which each team played all but their partner team at both netball rules and dodgeball rules. Exeter achieved a third victory in a row, managing to win all but one game against Chichester and one game against Bournemouth.

=== Varsity Tournament 2026 ===
Participating Teams: Exeter (2 teams), Birmingham (2 teams), Bournemouth (2 teams), Sheffield (3 teams), and Chichester (4 players). Sheffield's third team and Chichester combined to make one team.

The 2026 Benchball Varsity Tournament was being hosted by Sheffield. The structure of the tournament was a double round robin, in which each team played all but their partner team at both netball rules and dodgeball rules. Exeter achieved a forth victory in a row, going undefeated but having one disputed result (against Sheffield)

== Benchball in media ==
=== The Tab ===
University-level benchball has been the subject of multiple articles by university news site The Tab, and mentioned in several others.

=== Other references in news sources ===
- An article from BBC News discussing "alternative sports" mentions a benchball tournament amongst schools in Derby.
- A 2019 Oxford Mail article mentions benchball being played at a children's holiday camp.
- Somerset Live highlights benchball, among rugby and table tennis, as a key sport on offer at a local sixth form college.

=== References in other media ===
The 2009 book "Cross My Heart" by Helen Slavin mentions “the wet-weather game of Benchball in the assembly hall.”

== See also ==
- Prisonball
