= Waterford U16 Hurling Championship =

The Waterford U16 Hurling Championship is an underage hurling played by juvenile Gaelic Athletic Association (GAA) in Waterford in Ireland. All players have to be under the age of 16 in the year in which they take part. The competition is organized by the two divisions of the Waterford Bord na Óige - East Division and West Division. The current A division champions are Ballygunner GAA.

== Roll of honour ==
Year	Winner	Opponent
2011	Ballygunner	Dungarvan
2010	Ballygunner	Lismore
2009	Butlerstown/Dunhill/Fenor	Ballygunner
2008	Ballygunner	Dungarvan
2007	Ballygunner	
