= Prisonball =

Original dodgeball game

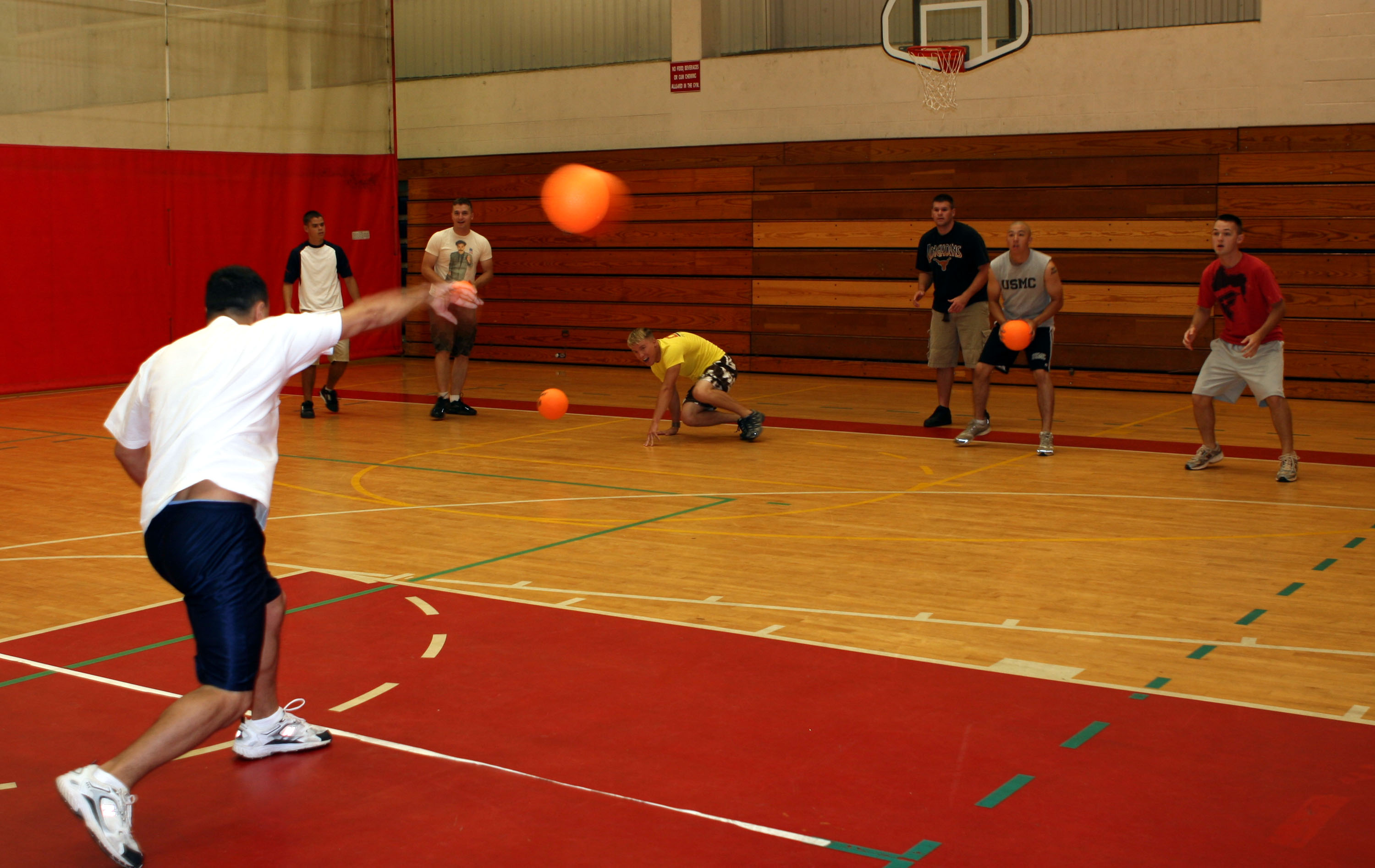
Prisonball

Prisonball (Note: Also known as prison dodgeball, nationball, battleball, trench, jail ball, jail dodgeball, jailbreak, greek dodgeball, German dodgeball, teamball, crossfire, warball, Swedish dodgeball, dungeon dodge; king's court in Canada, heaven in New Zealand, and nuke'em) is played much like the traditional dodgeball game, except when a player is hit, they get put in "prison" behind the opposing team. To get out of prison, the player needs to receive a pass from a teammate while in the designated prison area. The way in which prisoners are released varies by region. "Prisoners" remain behind the opposing team until the game is over or they're released according to the current ruleset.

== Variations ==
In a variation known as ghost, the prison is extended to the sides of the opponent's court, as well as the back. No one may be released from prison; however, anyone in prison is allowed to collect balls and attack the opposite team, provided they do not enter their court. This makes for a hectic game since as players are eliminated, teams will eventually be attacked from all four sides. The last team with a member remaining not in prison wins.

Sometimes in "prisonball," a ball thrown to a "prison," when caught, releases all the "prisoners" to their original side. Some variations make it so that prisoners can not attack opposing players, but if someone from their team on their side throws a ball and they catch it, they can come back in.

In some cases, a "buddy ball" is used and when caught, two people come back in. Sometimes, a player in prison is not allowed to take an active part in the game at all, but when any player is put in jail, everyone they put in jail is free. Thus, if a player does not see who hit them, that player is trapped for the rest of the game.

Another variation particular for when playing on basketball courts is that if the one team throws a dodgeball and it lands in the opposing teams basketball basket, all of its prisoners are freed. There are even more variations. Prisoners only get out of prison when someone on their team catches a ball, but prisoners can still throw balls at the other team to get them out. Prisoners are released in the order that they are put into prison.

Nationball (popularized in coastal Los Angeles and in past years played in schoolyards and the LA County Junior Lifeguards program) is a variation played with one ball and with one player from each team starting in the "prison" serving as the goalie. Only that player is allowed to return to the main court as they start the game with an extra life in exchange for initially serving as the goalie. Once other players are hit with a ball, they can continue to play the game but must remain behind the court in the "prison" area. A thrown ball must hit another player and then hit the ground to count as an "out." Once the ball hits the ground it is dead. If a ball is caught, the thrower is out and must go to the opposite end of the court to their respective "prison" area. Headshots do not count, unless the hit player ducks first and then is hit in the head (thus ducking "into" the headshot). Other variations of nationball include playing with multiple balls, or allowing all "jailed" players to return to the main court if there's only one player left and they withstand 30 throws without being hit.

Another usually standard rule is that "caught" balls are equally considered such (for the purposes of getting taken out or put back in) whether they are thrown by active team member or prisoners.

Nationball has been popular in continental Europe since at least the early eighteen-hundreds.

Also known as jail ball or jailbreak or prison ball follows the same rules as normal dodgeball, except that it incorporates the goal boxes on either end of the court; they are referred to as "jails." When a player gets out, he goes to "jail." In order for a player to get out of jail they must use a ball to get a player on the opposing team out. At this point the player is released from jail to play once more, and the other player goes to jail. This version dates back to 1966, and is also sometimes known as prisoner dodgeball.

Also played with being released from jail by catching a ball thrown from your own team from across the court, they would then get free passage to the other side, this version is without the ability to hit the other team while in jail.

Another variation has a prisoner released from prison when they receive a ball in prison and then proceed to hit an opposing player, also putting the opposing player in prison.

A further variation in Britain for scouts and physical education classes, is benchball. Those in prison stand on a bench behind the opposition, making it slightly easier to get out of jail.

This is not the real version of benchball, which more closely resembles netball.
