= Higher Education GAA =

Gaelic games governing body

Higher Education GAA is the governing body overseeing the Gaelic games of hurling, camogie and Gaelic football at third level institutions. The body coordinates competitions in both Ireland and Britain, and is a part of the parent organisation, the Gaelic Athletic Association. The main competitions are the Fitzgibbon Cup for hurling and Sigerson Cup for football.

== Hurling ==
=== Fitzgibbon Cup ===
The Fitzgibbon Cup is named after Edwin Fitzgibbon, a Capuchin friar and, from 1911 to 1936, a professor of philosophy at University College Cork.

In 1912, Fitzgibbon donated most of his annual salary to purchase the trophy. For the first 30 years, the cup was dominated by UCC and UCD, with UCG winning occasionally. Queen's University Belfast first took part in 1946, and won their only title in 1953.

The popularity of the championship grew, and, in the 1960s and 1970s three more colleges entered: Trinity College, Dublin, UU Coleraine and NUI Maynooth. In the late 1980s, all teams in Division One of the Higher Education League were admitted. Since participation in the event expanded, in the 1990s, several newer third level institutions from Limerick and Waterford entered and soon dominated the competition. Waterford IT won the title four times in six years, but UCC are the leaders in the roll of honour, with 39 titles.

== Gaelic football ==
=== Sigerson Cup ===
In 1911, the Sigerson Cup was first presented by George Sigerson to foster unity amongst the constituent colleges of the National Universities of Ireland, which was won for the first time by UCD. The competition has since broadened its membership with teams representing a larger number of universities and colleges.

== Gaelic games in British universities ==
=== Gaelic football ===
Gaelic football has been organised at universities across Britain, with the inaugural men's championship in 1990/91 and ladies' championship in 1997/98. Men's Gaelic football has been recognised by British Universities and Colleges Sport since 2003. The competitions have traditionally been dominated by universities with big Irish student populations, including Liverpool John Moores University, Liverpool Hope University, and St Mary's University, Twickenham.

The winners of the men's Division 1 Championship formerly qualified for the semi-finals of the Trench Cup, with St Mary's winning the competition in 2004. Currently, British university teams compete in the Corn na Mac Léinn, with Liverpool Hope winning back-to-back trophies in 2018 and 2019, and a combined Liverpool John Moores-Edge Hill University team winning the competition in 2020, 2022, and 2026.

Between 2001 and 2009, the ladies' Division 1 Championship winners entered the Lynch Cup. A reorganisation of HEC competitions in the 2009/10 season saw British teams moved to competing in different Irish competitions each year. In 2026, Coventry University became the first British winners of an Irish HEC competition with victory over a DCU Dóchas Éireann team in the Lagan Cup.

=== Hurling ===
Hurling - although at a smaller level - is also growing the UK. Nine teams took part in the most recent British University Hurling Championship. A select team has previously played annually against the Scottish Universities Shinty team.
