= Trench Cup =

Gaelic football competition

- Irish: Corn Uí Thrinsigh
- Code: Gaelic Football, second tier
- Founded: 1976
- Region: Third-Level Institutions (GAA)
- Title holders: Trinity College Dublin (3rd title)
- First winner: Thomond College
- Most titles: Institute of Technology, Sligo; Coláiste Phádraig, Droim Conrach (5 titles)
- Sponsors: Electric Ireland
- Official website: https://www.gaa.ie/highereducation/fixtures-and-results/trench-cup/

The Trench Cup is the second-tier Gaelic football championship trophy for third-level education colleges, institutes of technology and universities in Ireland and England (first tier is the Sigerson Cup and third tier is Corn na Mac Léinn). The Trench Cup Championship is administered by Comhairle Ard Oideachais, the Gaelic Athletic Association's Higher Education Council.

== History ==
In 1975 moves were made by non-university colleges to set up their own knock-out Gaelic football championship tournament as a consequence of being shut out of the Sigerson Cup Championship. The initiative came from St. Joseph's Training College, Belfast. The concept of the Trench Cup was proposed by Pat Blake, Comhairle Ard Oideachais Chairman (1978–1983), and Peter McGinnity (later a Fermanagh All-Star) as a knock-out competition for all higher education colleges not in the Sigerson Cup tournament. Pat Blake purchased a trophy costing £80 sterling at Tommy Lennon's Jewellers, Smithfield Market, Belfast. The trophy was named 'The Trench Cup' after Trench House, St Joseph's Training College, Belfast.

The competition first came into existence in the 1975/76 season. The inaugural final was played between St Joseph's T.C., Belfast and the National College of Physical Education, Limerick at Croke Park. NCPE became the inaugural champions. In the 1980s the Sigerson championship was opened up to allow an increasing number of universities, regional technical colleges and institutes of higher education to participate on the basis of their league success. Subsequently, the Trench Cup became the second tier competition for the third-level institutions which were not in the Sigerson championship.

Dundalk Institute of Technology are the current Trench Cup champions, after defeating Waterford IT on a scoreline of 1-14 to 1-08 at University Ulster on 20 February 2016. This was the college's first win. Both Coláiste Phádraig and Sligo IT share the record number of Trench Cup wins, standing at five, while Garda College have three wins. The highest winning margin is that of Thomond College, Limerick over Sligo RTC of 16 points in 1977, while the largest margin in the 21st century is that of Trinity College Dublin over Hope University, Liverpool of 10 points in 2012.

The joint highest individual points scorers in any Trench Cup final are D. Duggan of Garda College in 1993 (1-07, 10 points) and Seán O'Sullivan of Limerick IT in 1999 (2-06, 10 points).

The championship is currently sponsored by the Electric Ireland. It was previously sponsored by Independent.ie (2014-2017), Irish Daily Mail (2012-2013), Ulster Bank (2007-2011), Datapac (2003-2006) and Bus Éireann (1998-2002).

== Roll of honour ==
=== Wins listed by college ===
Team	County	Wins	Winning years
Sligo RTC	Sligo	5	1981, 1985, 1986, 1990, 1991
Coláiste Phádraig, Droim Conrach	Dublin	5	2002, 2007, 2009, 2011, 2014
Thomond College	Limerick	4	1976, 1977, 1982, 1988
Dundalk Institute of Technology [DkIT]	Louth	4	2016, 2017, 2023, 2025
Garda College	Tipperary	3	1993, 1994, 2015
Galway RTC Galway-Mayo Institute of Technology	Galway	3	1989, 1996, 2022
Trinity College Dublin	Dublin	3	2006, 2012, 2026
Dublin Institute of Technology	Dublin	3	1987, 1995, 1997
Letterkenny Institute of Technology	Donegal	2	2005, 2019
Mary Immaculate College Limerick	Limerick	2	2008, 2018
Institute of Technology Tallaght	Dublin	2	2001, 2003
Northern Ireland Polytechnic [University of Ulster Jordanstown]	Antrim	2	1980, 1983
Institute of Technology Tralee / MTU Tralee	Kerry	2	2010, 2024
Cork RTC Cork Institute of Technology	Cork	2	1979, 2020
Institute of Technology Blanchardstown	Dublin	1	2013
St Mary’s, Strawberry Hill, London [St Mary's University College, Twickenham]	Middlesex, England	1	2004
Cadet College, The Curragh	Kildare	1	2000
Limerick Institute of Technology	Limerick	1	1999
University of Ulster Coleraine	Derry	1	1998
Athlone RTC [Athlone Institute of Technology]	Westmeath	1	1992
NIHE Limerick [University of Limerick]	Limerick	1	1984
St Joseph’s Training College, Belfast [St Mary's University College, Belfast]	Antrim	1	1978

Finalists who have not won the Trench Cup:

- Liverpool Hope University
- Liverpool John Moore's University
- Magee College, Derry (now UU Magee)

=== Winners listed by year ===
- 1975/76 National College of Physical Education
- 1976/77 Thomond College
- 1977/78 St Joseph's Training College
- 1978/79 Cork RTC
- 1979/80 Northern Ireland Polytechnic
- 1980/81 Sligo RTC
- 1981/82 Thomond College
- 1982/83 Northern Ireland Polytechnic
- 1983/84 NIHE Limerick
- 1984/85 Sligo RTC
- 1985/86 Sligo RTC
- 1986/87 Dublin IT
- 1987/88 Thomond College
- 1988/89 Galway RTC
- 1989/90 Sligo RTC
- 1990/91 Sligo RTC
- 1991/92 Athone RTC
- 1992/93 Garda College
- 1993/94 Garda College
- 1994/95 Dublin IT
- 1995/96 Galway RTC
- 1996/97 Dublin IT
- 1997/98 UU Coleraine
- 1998/99 Limerick IT
- 1999/00 Army Cadet College
- 2000/01 IT Tallaght
- 2001/02 Coláiste Phádraig, Droim Conrach
- 2002/03 IT Tallaght
- 2003/04 St Mary's College Strawberry Hill
- 2004/05 Letterkenny IT
- 2005/06 Trinity College Dublin
- 2006/07 Coláiste Phádraig, Droim Conrach
- 2007/08 Mary Immaculate College
- 2008/09 Coláiste Phádraig, Droim Conrach
- 2009/10 IT Tralee
- 2010/11 Coláiste Phádraig, Droim Conrach
- 2011/12 Trinity College Dublin
- 2012/13 Blanchardstown IT
- 2013/14 Coláiste Phádraig, Droim Conrach
- 2014/15 Garda College
- 2015/16 Dundalk Institute of Technology (DkIT)
- 2016/17 Dundalk Institute of Technology (DkIT)
- 2017/18 Mary Immaculate College Limerick
- 2018/19 Letterkenny Institute of Technology
- 2019/20 Cork Institute of Technology
- 2020/21 Not held due to Covid-19 pandemic
- 2021/22 Galway-Mayo Institute of Technology (GMIT)

=== Winning captains listed by year ===
Year	Player	College	County
1975/76	Brian Mullins	N.C.P.E., Limerick	Dublin
1976/77	Pat Spillane	Thomond College, Limerick	Kerry
1977/78		St Joseph's T.C., Belfast	
1978/79	Diarmuid Mac Cartaigh	Cork RTC	Cork
1979/80	Kevin McCabe	Northern Ireland Polytechnic	Tyrone
1980/81	John Clarke	Sligo RTC	
1981/82	Brian Ladden	Thomond College, Limerick	Kerry
1982/83	Anthony McArdle	Northern Ireland Polytechnic	Armagh
1983/84	Noel Hayes	NIHE Limerick	Cork
1984/85	Gary Walsh	Sligo RTC	Donegal
1985/86		Sligo RTC	
1986/87	Fergus Rowley	Dublin Institute of Technology	Dublin
1987/88	Seamus Kyne	Thomond College, Limerick	
	Patrick Condon	Thomond College, Limerick	Kerry
1988/89	Michael Haran	Galway RTC	Sligo
1989/90	Gerard Holohan	Sligo RTC	Leitrim
1990/91	P.J. Monaghan	Sligo RTC	Mayo
1991/92	John "Jack" Cooney	Athlone RTC	Westmeath
1992/93	David O'Connor	Garda College	Waterford
1993/94	Martin Coyle	Garda College	Mayo
1994/95	Gerry Sheridan	Dublin Institute of Technology	Cavan
	Damian Diver	Dublin Institute of Technology	Donegal
1995/96	Fergal Costello	Galway RTC	Mayo
1996/97	Padraig Giles	Dublin Institute of Technology	Dublin
1997/98	Neill McGleenan	UU Coleraine	Derry
1998/99		Limerick Institute of Technology	
1999/00	Padraig Brennan	Army Cadet College, The Curragh	Kildare
2000/01	Shane O'Sullivan	Institute of Technology Tallaght	Dublin
2001/02	Gareth Burns	Coláiste Phádraig, Droim Conrach	Galway
2002/03	Damien Murray	Institute of Technology Tallaght	Offaly
2003/04	Cathal Smyth	St Mary's College, Strawberry Hill	Meath
2004/05	Neil Gallagher	Letterkenny Institute of Technology	Donegal
2005/06	Pearse Casey	Trinity College Dublin	Dublin
	Shane Gilleran	Trinity College Dublin	Roscommon
2006/07	Rory Stapleton	Coláiste Phádraig, Droim Conrach	Laois
	Brian Kavanagh	Coláiste Phádraig, Droim Conrach	Longford
2007/08	Andrew O'Regan	Mary Immaculate College, Limerick	Kerry
2008/09	Declan McKiernan	Coláiste Phádraig, Droim Conrach	Cavan
2009/10	Shane Brosnan	Institute of Technology Tralee	Kerry
	Kevin Hartnett	Institute of Technology Tralee	Clare
2010/11	Seán Denvir	Coláiste Phádraig, Droim Conrach	Galway
2011/12	Tomás Corrigan	Trinity College Dublin	Fermanagh
2012/13	Eoin Woods	Institute of Technology Blanchardstown	Meath
2013/14	Sean Kelly	Coláiste Phádraig, Droim Conrach	Mayo
2014/15	Colm Ó Cuív	Garda College, Templemore	Galway
2015/16	Kieran Duffy	Dundalk Institute of Technology	Monaghan
2016/17	Kieran Duffy	Dundalk Institute of Technology	Monaghan
2017/18	Cillian Fahy	Mary Immaculate College Limerick	Limerick
2018/19	Callum Gallagher	Letterkenny Institute of Technology	Donegal
2018/19	Kieran Murphy	Cork Institute of Technology	Kerry
2020/21	Not held due to Covid-19		
2021/22	Liam Costello	Galway-Mayo Institute of Technology	Galway

=== Man of the Match awardees listed by year ===
The accolade of Man of the Match or Tournament is a recent innovation (1998). In the case of the early years of the Trench Cup, the highest scoring member of the team is designated.

Year	MOTM	Top scorer	College	County	Points scored
1975/76		Pat Spillane	N.C.P.E., Limerick	Kerry	1-3
		John Tobin	N.C.P.E., Limerick	Galway	0-6
1976/77		Gerry Dillon	Thomond College, Limerick		1-3
1977/78		Peter Kane	St Joseph's TC, Belfast	Galway	1-3
1978/79		Diarmuid McCarthy	Cork RTC	Cork	1-5
1979/80		Martin McCann	Northern Ireland Polytechnic	Down	0-6
1980/81		Gerry Smith	Sligo RTC	Cavan	1-6
1981/82			Thomond College, Limerick		
1982/83		D. Durkan	Northern Ireland Polytechnic		1-0
		P. Madden	Northern Ireland Polytechnic		0-3
1983/84		Patrick McGroarty	NIHE Limerick	Donegal	1-2
		Brian Donovan	NIHE Dublin	Kildare	0-5
		F O'Connor	NIHE Limerick		0-3 (Replay)
1984/85		Niall McVeigh	Sligo RTC	Sligo	0-5
1985/86		Tom Og O'Brien	Sligo RTC	Roscommon	0-2
1986/87		John Prendergast	Dublin IT	Mayo	1-2
1987/88		John Madden	Thomond College, Limerick	Tipperary	0-6
1988/89		Jarlath Jennings	Galway RTC	Mayo	1-1
1989/90			Sligo RTC		
1990/91		Derek Duggan	Sligo RTC	Roscommon	0-6
1991/92		Brian Duignan	Athlone RTC	Leitrim	0-4
1992/93		Derek Duggan	Garda College	Roscommon	1-7
1993/94			Garda College		
1994/95		Tony Byrne	Dublin IT	Meath	0-3 (3fs)
1995/96		Alan MacFadden	Galway RTC	Donegal	0-3
		Enda Bardon	Galway RTC	Longford	0-3
1996/97		Gavin Curley	Dublin IT	Leitrim	0-7 (1f)
1997/98	Niall McSorley	Niall McSorley	UU Coleraine	Tyrone	3-0
1998/99	Seán O'Sullivan	Seán O'Sullivan	Limerick IT	Kerry	2-4 (1-3fs)
1999/00	Ronan Carberry		Army Cadet College	Longford	—
		Bernard Bohan	Army Cadet College	Kildare	1-0
		Dave O'Loughlin	Army Cadet College	Clare	1-0
		Padraig Brennan	Army Cadet College	Kildare	0-3 (3fs)
2000/01	Michael Lyons		IT Tallaght	Dublin	
		Danny McCann	IT Tallaght	Dublin	0-4 (2fs)
2001/02	Kevin Giblin		Coláiste Phádraig, Droim Conrach	Sligo	
		G Kenny	Coláiste Phádraig, Droim Conrach	Longford	0-5
2002/03	Danny McCann		IT Tallaght	Dublin	
		Jonathan Daniels	IT Tallaght	Wicklow	1-2
2003/04			St Mary's College, Strawberry Hill		
		C Slane	St Mary's College, Strawberry Hill		0-4 (2fs)
2004/05	Neil Gallagher		Letterkenny IT	Donegal	
		Colm McFadden	Letterkenny IT	Donegal	1-3 (1f)
2005/06	Dermot McTernan	Dermot McTernan	Trinity College Dublin	Sligo	1-4
2006/07	David Henry		Coláiste Phádraig, Droim Conrach	Dublin	0-1
		Brian Kavanagh	Coláiste Phádraig, Droim Conrach		0-8 (8fs)
2007/08	George Hannigan		Mary Immaculate College, Limerick	Tipperary	
2008/09			Coláiste Phádraig, Droim Conrach		
2009/10	Paul O'Donoghue		IT Tralee	Kerry	0-1
		Brendan Poff	IT Tralee	Kerry	1-0 (f)
		Denis Crowley	IT Tralee	Cork	1-0
2010/11			Coláiste Phádraig, Droim Conrach		
		Frank Clune	Coláiste Phádraig, Droim Conrach	Wicklow	1-3 (3fs)
		Seán Denvir	Coláiste Phádraig, Droim Conrach	Galway	1-3
2011/12	Kevin Fitzgerald		Trinity College Dublin	Dublin	—
		Leo Turley	Trinity College Dublin		1-2 (2fs)
2012/13	Donal Lenihan		IT Blanchardstown	Meath	0-5
		Robert McCarthy	IT Blanchardstown	Meath	0-6 (4fs)
2013/14	Diarmuid Murtagh	Diarmuid Murtagh	Coláiste Phádraig, Droim Conrach	Roscommon	1-3
2014/15	Colin Compton	Colin Compton	Garda College	Roscommon	0-8 (0-4fs)
2015/16	Daniel McKenna	Daniel McKenna	Dundalk Institute of Technology (DkIT)	Monaghan	0-5 (0-1f)
2016/17	Tadhg McEnaeney	Tadhg McEnaeney	Dundalk Institute of Technology (DkIT)	Louth	1-6 (4fs)
2017/18	Liam Carey		Mary Immaculate College Limerick	Kerry	
2018/19	Michael Langan		Letterkenny Institute of Technology	Donegal	0-4 (4fs)
2018/19		John Campbell	Letterkenny Institute of Technology	Donegal	0-5 (5fs)
2019/20		Damien Gore	Cork Institute of Technology	Cork	0-8 (4fs)
2020/21	Not held due to Covid-19				
2021/22	Final not held				

== Finals listed by year ==
Year	Winners	Score	Finalists	Score	Where played	Date
1975/76	National College of Physical Education	1-11	St Joseph's Training College, Belfast	0-09	Croke Park, Dublin	29 February 1976
1976/77	Thomond College, Limerick	2-13	Sligo RTC	0-03	Athlone	1 April 1977
1977/78	St Joseph's Training College, Belfast	1-08	Thomond College, Limerick	1-06	Parnell Park, Dublin	22 April 1978
1978/79	Cork RTC	1-10	Coláiste Phádraig, Droim Conrach	1-07	Cashel, County Tipperary	19 May 1979
1979/80	Northern Ireland Polytechnic	1-06	Coláiste Phádraig, Droim Conrach	0-08	Croke Park, Dublin	9 March 1980
1980/81	Sligo RTC	1-08	Mary Immaculate College, Limerick	0-08	Croke Park, Dublin	15 April 1981
1981/82	Thomond College, Limerick	1-09	Cork RTC	2-05	Buttevant, County Cork	20 March 1982
1982/83	Northern Ireland Polytechnic	1-06	Cork RTC	0-07	Croke Park, Dublin	26 March 1983
1983/84	NIHE Limerick	3-07	NIHE Dublin	2-10	Tullamore, County Offaly	5 May 1984
	NIHE Limerick	0-07	NIHE Dublin	0-05	Tullamore, County Offaly	12 May 1984 (Replay)
1984/85	Sligo RTC	0-11	St Joseph's Training College, Belfast	1-06	Omagh, County Tyrone	8 May 1985
1985/86	Sligo RTC	0-05	Dublin Institute of Technology	0-04	Centenary Park, Newtownforbes, County Longford	3 May 1986
1986/87	Dublin Institute of Technology	2-11	Sligo RTC	2-09	Ballynacargy, County Westmeath (AET)	5 June 1987
1987/88	Thomond College, Limerick	2-11	Athlone RTC	2-07	Plassey, Limerick	6 March 1988
1988/89	Galway RTC	2-06	Dundalk RTC	1-05	Dublin	5 March 1989
1989/90	Sligo RTC		Athlone RTC		Dundalk, County Louth	11 March 1990
1990/91	Sligo RTC	2-11	Dublin Institute of Technology	1-10	Terenure, Dublin (AET)	24 March 1991
1991/92	Athlone RTC	0-11	Galway RTC	1-04	Kiltoom, County Roscommon	15 March 1992
1992/93	Garda College	1-13	Dundalk RTC	1-05	Thurles, County Tipperary	21 March 1993
1993/94	Garda College	1-10	Dublin Institute of Technology	1-07	VEC Grounds, Terenure, Dublin	27 February 1994
1994/95	Dublin Institute of Technology	0-10	Institute of Technology Tralee	1-06	Páirc Uí Chaoimh, Cork	12 March 1995
1995/96	Galway RTC	0-11	Dublin Institute of Technology	0-07	Limerick	3 March 1996
1996/97	Dublin Institute of Technology	0-17	Dundalk RTC	2-09	UUC Playing Fields, Coleraine	9 March 1997
1997/98	University of Ulster Coleraine	4-04	Cork Institute of Technology	2-07	Ballyheighue, County Kerry	8 March 1998
1998/99	Limerick Institute of Technology	2-07	Magee College	1-07	The Dub, Belfast	7 March 1999
1999/00	Army Cadet College, The Curragh	2-05	Limerick Institute of Technology	1-07	Dangan, Galway	27 February 2000
2000/01	Institute of Technology Tallaght	3-07	Coláiste Phádraig, Droim Conrach	1-11	O'Toole Park, Crumlin, Dublin	11 April 2001
2001/02	Coláiste Phádraig, Droim Conrach	2-07	Limerick Institute of Technology	0-04	Kent Park, Sligo	23 February 2002
2002/03	Institute of Technology Tallaght	1-07	Coláiste Phádraig, Droim Conrach	1-05	UCC Grounds, The Mardyke, Cork	8 March 2003
2003/04	St Mary’s College, Strawberry Hill, London	1-09	Institute of Technology Tallaght	1-08	St Gall's Park, Belfast	29 February 2004
2004/05	Letterkenny Institute of Technology	2-09	Coláiste Phádraig, Droim Conrach	0-10	Dundalk IT Grounds, Dundalk	26 February 2005
2005/06	Trinity College Dublin	3-07	Coláiste Phádraig, Droim Conrach	2-08	DCU Sport Grounds, Dublin	25 February 2006
2006/07	Coláiste Phádraig, Droim Conrach	0-13	John Moore's University, Liverpool	0-12	QUB Grounds, Malone, Belfast	3 March 2007
2007/08	Mary Immaculate College, Limerick	1-12	Coláiste Phádraig, Droim Conrach	0-09	IT Carlow Grounds, Carlow	9 March 2008
2008/09	Coláiste Phádraig, Droim Conrach	0-12	Mary Immaculate College, Limerick	0-07	Cork Institute of Technology, Bishopstown, Cork	1 March 2009
2009/10	Institute of Technology Tralee	2-06	Trinity College Dublin	0-10	Leixlip GAA Club, Leixlip, County Kildare	27 February 2010
2010/11	Coláiste Phádraig, Droim Conrach	2-11	Waterford Institute of Technology	0-10	UCD, Belfield, Dublin	5 March 2011
2011/12	Trinity College Dublin	2-11	Hope University, Liverpool	0-07	Dangan, Galway	25 February 2012
2012/13	Institute of Technology Blanchardstown	0-11	Coláiste Phádraig, Droim Conrach	0-10	Athlone Institute of Technology	23 February 2013
2013/14	Coláiste Phádraig, Droim Conrach	2-16	Letterkenny Institute of Technology	2-06	The Dub, QUB, Belfast	21 February 2014
2014/15;	Garda College, Templemore	1-13	Coláiste Phádraig, Droim Conrach	0-10	The Mardyke, Cork	21 February 2015
2015/16	Dundalk Institute of Technology	1-14	Waterford Institute of Technology	1-08	University of Ulster, Belfast	20 February 2016
2016/17	Dundalk Institute of Technology	3-10	Waterford Institute of Technology	1-14	Connacht GAA Centre, Bekan, County Mayo	19 February 2017
2017/18	Mary Immaculate College Limerick	2-14	Waterford Institute of Technology	1-16	TCD GAA Pitch, Santry, Dublin	17 February 2018
2018/19	Letterkenny Institute of Technology	2-07	Dundalk Institute of Technology	0-15	Mallow, Cork	16 February 2019
2019/20	Cork Institute of Technology	2-20	Mary Immaculate College	0-12	Dublin City University Sports Campus	12 February 2020
2020/21	Not held due to Covid-19 pandemic					
2021/22	Galway-Mayo Institute of Technology	w/o	Dundalk Institute of Technology	Withdrew from final	Institute of Technology Carlow	18 February 2022
2022/23	Dundalk Institute of Technology		TUS Midlands		WIT Sports Campus	15 February 2023
2023/24	MTU Tralee	3-13	Dundalk Institute of Technology	2-10	MTU Kerry	14 February 2024
2024/25	Dundalk Institute of Technology	0-16	Trinity College Dublin	0-13	Connacht Centre of Excellence	12 February 2025
2025/26	Trinity College Dublin	3-19	Mary Immaculate College	2-21	Dublin City University Sports Campus	11 February 2026
