= 2023 Tailteann Cup =

Gaelic football competition

Tournament details
- Level: Tier 2
- Year: 2023
- Trophy: Tailteann Cup
- Date: 13 May – 15 July 2023
- Teams: 17

Winners
- Champions: Meath
- Manager: Colm O'Rourke
- Captain: Donal Keogan

Runners-up
- Runners-up: Down
- Manager: Conor Laverty
- Captain: Pierce Laverty

Other
- Matches played: 35

The 2023 Tailteann Cup was the second edition of the Tailteann Cup, a Gaelic football competition contested by the seventeen county teams that did not qualify for a provincial final, including New York (the other teams competed for the Sam Maguire Cup). These teams initially competed in their provincial championship and if they reached their provincial final, they continued in the 2023 All-Ireland Senior Football Championship, progressing to the All-Ireland group stage.

The final was played on 15 July 2023 at Croke Park in Dublin, between Meath and Down. Meath won after defeating Down 2–13 to 0–14.

== Format ==
=== Cup format ===
The 17 teams who competed in the 2023 All-Ireland Senior Football Championship but did not qualify for the round-robin group stages compete in the Tailteann Cup. Limerick and Meath enter the Tailteann Cup for the first time.

New York advance directly to the preliminary quarter-finals. The other 16 teams are drawn into four groups of four teams. Seeding is determined by placing in the 2023 National Football League (after promotion and relegation is applied and after division finals take place).

The Group Stage is divided into four groups of four teams, with each team in a group playing the other teams in their group once; each team gets one home fixture, one away and one neutral. Teams are awarded two points for a win and one point for a draw.

The four preliminary quarter-finals will consist of the second-placed teams receiving home advantage against New York and the three third-placed teams with the best record. At the quarter-final stage the four group winners play the four preliminary quarter-final winners.

The semi-finals and final are played in Croke Park. All knock-out matches are winner on the day. The winner of the 2023 Tailteann Cup qualify for the group stage of 2024 All-Ireland Senior Football Championship regardless of their league position.

=== Teams by province ===
The participating teams, listed by province, with numbers in parentheses indicating final positions in the 2023 National Football League before the championship were:

Britain (1)

- London (32)

Connacht (1)

- Leitrim (29)

Leinster (7)

- Carlow (30)
- Laois (27)
- Longford (25)
- Meath (14) (debut)
- Offaly (21)
- Wexford (28)
- Wicklow (24)

Munster (3)

- Limerick (18) (debut)
- Tipperary (26)
- Waterford (31)

Ulster (4)

- Antrim (22)
- Cavan (15)
- Down (19)
- Fermanagh (16)

America (1)

- New York (DNE)

== Team changes ==
=== To Championship ===
Relegated from the All-Ireland Senior Football Championship

- Limerick
- Meath

=== From Championship ===
Promoted to the All-Ireland Senior Football Championship

- Sligo
- Westmeath

== Teams ==
=== General information ===
Seventeen county teams competed in the Tailteann Cup:

| County | Last Cup title | Last Provincial Title | Last All-Ireland Title | Position in 2022 | Appearance |
|---|---|---|---|---|---|
| Antrim | — | 1951 | — | Round 1 | 2nd |
| Down | — | 1994 | 1994 | Round 1 | 2nd |
| Carlow | — | 1944 | — | Quarter-finals | 2nd |
| Cavan | — | 2020 | 1952 | Runners-up | 2nd |
| Fermanagh | — | — | — | Quarter-finals | 2nd |
| Laois | — | 2003 | — | Round 1 | 2nd |
| Leitrim | — | 1994 | — | Quarter-finals | 2nd |
| Limerick | — | 1896 | 1896 | Round 2 (All-Ireland Senior Football Championship) | 1st |
| London | — | — | — | Round 1 | 2nd |
| Longford | — | 1968 | — | Round 1 | 2nd |
| Meath | — | 2010 | 1999 | Round 1 (All-Ireland Senior Football Championship) | 1st |
| Offaly | — | 1997 | 1982 | Semi-finals | 2nd |
| New York | — | — | — | Quarter-finals | 2nd |
| Tipperary | — | 2020 | 1920 | Round 1 | 2nd |
| Waterford | — | 1898 | — | Preliminary round | 2nd |
| Wexford | — | 1945 | 1918 | Preliminary round | 2nd |
| Wicklow | — | — | — | Round 1 | 2nd |

=== Personnel and kits ===
| County | Manager | Captain(s) | Sponsor |
|---|---|---|---|
| Antrim | Andy McEntee | Peter Healy | Fibrus |
| Carlow | Niall Carew | Sean Gannon | SETU |
| Cavan | Mickey Graham | Raymond Galligan | Kingspan Group |
| Down | Conor Laverty | Pierce Laverty | EOS IT Solutions |
| Fermanagh | Kieran Donnelly | Declan McCusker | Tracey Concrete |
| Laois | Billy Sheehan | Trevor Collins and Evan O’Carroll | MW Hire Group |
| Leitrim | Andy Moran | Donal Wrynn | J. P. Clarke's Saloon, New York |
| Limerick | Mark Fitzgerald | Iain Corbett and Donal O’Sullivan | JP McManus |
| London | Michael Maher | Liam Gavaghan | Clayton Hotel |
| Longford | Paddy Christie | Patrick Fox | Glennon Brothers |
| Meath | Colm O'Rourke | Donal Keogan | Bective Stud, Tea Rooms and Apartments |
| New York | Johnny McGeeney | Johnny Glynn | Navillus |
| Offaly | Martin Murphy | Declan Hogan | Glenisk |
| Tipperary | David Power | Conor Sweeney | Fiserv |
| Waterford | Ephie Fitzgerald | Dermot Ryan | Cognizant |
| Wexford | John Hegarty | Liam Coleman | Zurich Insurance Group |
| Wicklow | Oisín McConville | Padraig O’Toole | Renault |

== Draws ==
=== Group stage seeding ===
Numbers in brackets indicate ranking in the 2023 NFL.

Pot 1

- Meath (14)
- Cavan (15)
- Fermanagh (16)
- Limerick (18)

Pot 2

- Down (19)
- Offaly (21)
- Antrim (22)
- Wicklow (24)

Pot 3

- Longford (25)
- Tipperary (26)
- Laois (27)
- Wexford (28)

Pot 4

- Leitrim (29)
- Carlow (30)
- Waterford (31)
- London (32)

New York (33) enter the Tailteann Cup at the preliminary quarter-final stage.

=== Knockout stage seeding ===
The preliminary quarter-final draw took place on 4 June 2023 on RTÉ Radio 1.

Seeded into quarter-finals

- Cavan (1st Group 1)
- Limerick (1st Group 2)
- Meath (1st Group 3)
- Antrim (1st Group 4)

Seeded into preliminary quarter-finals

- Offaly (2nd Group 1)
- Down (2nd Group 2)
- Carlow (2nd Group 3)
- Fermanagh (2nd Group 4)

Unseeded in preliminary quarter-finals

- Laois (3rd Group 1)
- Longford (3rd Group 3)
- Wexford (3rd Group 4)
- New York (automatically placed in preliminary quarter-finals)

== Group stage ==
=== Group 1 ===
| Pos | Team | Pld | W | D | L | PF | PA | PD | Pts | Qualification |
|---|---|---|---|---|---|---|---|---|---|---|
| 1 | Cavan | 3 | 3 | 0 | 0 | 75 | 44 | +31 | 6 | Advance to quarter-final |
| 2 | Offaly | 3 | 1 | 1 | 1 | 49 | 56 | −7 | 3 | Advance to preliminary quarter-final |
| 3 | Laois | 3 | 0 | 2 | 1 | 51 | 60 | −9 | 2 | Advance to preliminary quarter-final |
| 4 | London | 3 | 0 | 1 | 2 | 43 | 58 | −15 | 1 | |

Source: GAA

| 13 May 2023 Round 1 | Cavan | 2–20 – 1–14 | Laois | Cavan |
| 16:00 IST (UTC+1) | Paddy Lynch 1–3 (1–0 pen, 0–1f), Gearóid McKiernan 0–4 (0–3f), Gerard Smith 0–3, Jonathan McCabe 1–0, James Smith 0–2, Tiarnan Madden 0–2, Raymond Galligan 0–1 (0–1 '45), Ryan O'Neill 0–1, Oisín Kiernan 0–1, Conor Brady 0–1, Cian Madden 0–1, Ryan Donohoe 0–1 | Report | Mark Barry 0–5 (0–3f), Evan O'Carroll 1–2 (0–1 '45), Paul Kingston 0–2 (0–1f), Kieran Lillis 0–2, Eoin Lowry 0–1 (0–1m), Damon Larkin 0–1, Padraig Kirwan 0–1 | Stadium: Kingspan Breffni; Referee: Anthony Nolan |

| 14 May 2023 Round 1 | Offaly | 2–14 – 0–11 | London | Tullamore |
| 14:00 IST (UTC+1) | Cian Farrell 2–4 (0–1f), Dylan Hyland 0–4 (0–1f, 0–1m), Nigel Dunne 0–3 (0–2f, 0–1m), Cormac Delaney 0–1 (0–1f), Jack McEvoy 0–1, Anton Sullivan 0–1 | Report | Conal Gallagher 0–3, Liam Gavaghan 0–2 (0–1f), Aidan McLoughlin 0–2, Joshua Obahor 0–2, Joseph McGill 0–1 (0–1f), Liam Gallagher 0–1 | Stadium: Glenisk O'Connor Park; Referee: David Murnane |

| 20 May 2023 Round 2 | London | 2–6 – 0–18 | Cavan | Ruislip |
| 14:00 IST (UTC+1) | Liam Gavaghan 0–4 (0–4f), Liam Gallagher 1–0, Enda Lynn 1–0, Joshua Obahor 0–1 (0–1f), Daniel Clarke 0–1 | Report | Paddy Lynch 0–7 (0–6f), Gearóid McKiernan 0–3 (0–1f), James Smith 0–2, Oisín Kiernan 0–1, Jonathan McCabe 0–1, Tiarnan Madden 0–1, Ryan O'Neill 0–1, Oisin Brady 0–1, Conor Rehill 0–1 | Stadium: McGovern Park; Referee: John Gilmartin |

| 20 May 2023 Round 2 | Laois | 1–11 – 1–11 | Offaly | Portlaoise |
| 19:00 IST (UTC+1) | Kieran Lillis 1–0, Mark Barry 0–2 (0–1f), Paul Kingston 0–2, Damon Larkin 0–2, Patrick O'Sullivan 0–2, Mark Timmons 0–1, Colm Murphy 0–1, Niall Corbet 0–1 | Report | Dylan Hyland 0–4 (0–1f), Nigel Dunne 0–3 (0–1f, 0–1 '45), Joe Maher 1–0, Nigel Bracken 0–2, Anton Sullivan 0–1, Ciarán Donnelly 0–1 | Stadium: Laois Hire O'Moore Park; Referee: Liam Devenney |

| 3 June 2023 Round 3 | Cavan | 2–25 – 2–9 | Offaly | Longford |
| 15:00 IST (UTC+1) | Brandon Boylan 2–2, Paddy Lynch 0–4 (0–2f, 0–1m), Gearóid McKiernan 0–4 (0–2f), Raymond Galligan 0–3 (0–3f), Oisín Kiernan 0–2, Conor Brady 0–2, Oisin Brady 0–2, Padraig Faulkner 0–1, Ciarán Brady 0–1, Killian Clarke 0–1, Jonathan McCabe 0–1, Conor Moynagh 0–1, Caoimhán McGovern 0–1 | Report | Anton Sullivan 1–1, Nigel Dunne 0–3 (0–2f, 0–1 '45), Joe Maher 1–0, Cian Farrell 0–2 (0–1f), Cian Donohoe 0–1, Ruairi McNamee 0–1, Nigel Bracken 0–1 | Stadium: Glennon Brothers Pearse Park; Referee: Jerome Henry |

| 3 June 2023 Round 3 | Laois | 1–17 – 2–14 | London | Dublin |
| 15:00 IST (UTC+1) | Paul Kingston 0–8 (0–6f, 0–1m), Mark Timmons 1–1, Mark Barry 0–3 (0–1f), Padraig Kirwan 0–1, Eoin Lowry 0–1, Colm Murphy 0–1, Evan O'Carroll 0–1, Niall Corbet 0–1 | Report | Enda Lynn 1–2, Henry Walsh 1–2, Liam Gavaghan 0–3 (0–3f), Chris Farley 0–3 (0–1f), Liam Gallagher 0–3, Joseph McGill 0–1 | Stadium: Parnell Park; Referee: Sean Lonergan |

=== Group 2 ===
| Pos | Team | Pld | W | D | L | PF | PA | PD | Pts | Qualification |
|---|---|---|---|---|---|---|---|---|---|---|
| 1 | Meath | 3 | 3 | 0 | 0 | 62 | 40 | +22 | 6 | Advance to quarter-final |
| 2 | Down | 3 | 2 | 0 | 1 | 56 | 29 | +27 | 4 | Advance to preliminary quarter-final |
| 3 | Tipperary | 3 | 1 | 0 | 2 | 34 | 62 | −28 | 2 | |
| 4 | Waterford | 3 | 0 | 0 | 3 | 42 | 63 | −21 | 0 | |

Source: GAA

| 13 May 2023 Round 1 | Down | 2–14 – 1–6 | Waterford | Newry |
| 18:00 IST (UTC+1) | Pat Havern 0–5 (0–2f, 0–1m), Andrew Gilmore 0–4 (0–2f), Eamon Brown 1–0, Odhran Murdock 1–0, Donagh McAleenan 0–2, Anthony Morgan 0–1, Shealan Johnston 0–1, Eugene Branagan 0–1 | Report | Conor Murray 1–0, Jason Curry 0–2 (0–2f), Darragh Corcoran 0–2, Jason Gleeson 0–1 (0–1f), Dermot Ryan 0–1 | Stadium: Páirc Esler; Referee: Barry Cassidy |

| 13 May 2023 Round 1 | Meath | 1–19 – 0–11 | Tipperary | Navan |
| 18:30 IST (UTC+1) | Aaron Lynch 1–3 (0–1f, 0–1m), Jordan Morris 0–4, Matthew Costello 0–3 (0–2f), Thomas O'Reilly 0–3, Jack O'Connor 0–2, Jack Flynn 0–1 (0–1f), Conor Gray 0–1, Donal Keogan 0–1, Donal Lenihan 0–1 | Report | Jack Kennedy 0–3 (0–2 '45), Michael O'Reilly 0–2 (0–1f, 0–1 '45), Steven O'Brien 0–2 (0–1m), Mark Russell 0–2 (0–1f), Liam McGrath 0–1, Colman Kennedy 0–1 | Stadium: Páirc Tailteann; Referee: Brendan Griffin |

| 20 May 2023 Round 2 | Waterford | 1–14 – 3–17 | Meath | Dungarvan |
| 18:30 IST (UTC+1) | Darragh Corcoran 0–8 (0–7f), Jason Curry 1–0, Conor Murray 0–2, Dermot Ryan 0–2, Tom O'Connell 0–1 (0–1f), Jordan O'Sullivan 0–1 | Report | Matthew Costello 1–5 (0–3f), Aaron Lynch 0–6 (0–2f), Donal Lenihan 1–2 (0–1f, 0–1m), Jordan Morris 1–2 (0–1m), Eoghan Frayne 0–1, James McEntee 0–1 | Stadium: Fraher Field; Referee: Sean Lonergan |

| 21 May 2023 Round 2 | Tipperary | 0–6 – 2–18 | Down | Thurles |
| 13:45 IST (UTC+1) | Jack Kennedy 0–4 (0–1f), Sean O'Connor 0–2 | Report | Pat Havern 0–6 (0–5f), Shealan Johnston 1–1 (0–1f), Odhran Murdock 1–0, Danny Magill 0–3, Eamon Brown 0–2 (0–2f), Ceilum Doherty 0–2, Andrew Gilmore 0–1 (0–1f), Conor Francis 0–1, Ryan Johnston 0–1, Ross Carr 0–1 | Stadium: FBD Semple Stadium; Referee: Thomas Murphy |

| 3 June 2023 Round 3 | Meath | 1–11 – 1–9 | Down | Dublin |
| 13:00 IST (UTC+1) | Jordan Morris 1–3 (1–0 pen, 0–1m), Daithi McGowan 0–2 (0–1f, 0–1 '45), James McEntee 0–2, Jack Flynn 0–1 (0–1f), Donal Lenihan 0–1 (0–1f), Jack O'Connor 0–1, Matthew Costello 0–1 | Report | Pat Havern 0–5 (0–5f), Odhran Murdock 1–0, Liam Kerr 0–2 (0–1f), Niall Kane 0–1 (0–1 '45), Daniel Guinness 0–1 | Stadium: Parnell Park; Referee: Fergal Kelly |

| 3 June 2023 Round 3 | Tipperary | 0–17 – 1–13 | Waterford | Cork |
| 13:00 IST (UTC+1) | Jack Kennedy 0–8 (0–5f), Conall Kennedy 0–2, Teddy Doyle 0–2, Darragh Brennan 0–2, Shane O'Connell 0–1, Kevin Fahey 0–1, Mark Russell 0–1 | | Conor Murray 1–3, Darragh Corcoran 0–4 (0–3f), Jason Curry 0–2 (0–2f), Jordan O'Sullivan 0–1, Michael Curry 0–1, Jason Gleeson 0–1, Donal Fitzgerald 0–1 | Stadium: Páirc Uí Chaoimh; Referee: Seamus Mulhare |

=== Group 3 ===
| Pos | Team | Pld | W | D | L | PF | PA | PD | Pts | Qualification |
|---|---|---|---|---|---|---|---|---|---|---|
| 1 | Limerick | 3 | 2 | 0 | 1 | 57 | 53 | +4 | 4 (Note: Limerick are ranked ahead of Carlow as they won the head-to-head game between the teams) | Advance to quarter-final |
| 2 | Carlow | 3 | 2 | 0 | 1 | 50 | 55 | −5 | 4 | Advance to preliminary quarter-final |
| 3 | Longford | 3 | 1 | 0 | 2 | 62 | 56 | +6 | 2 (Note: Longford are ranked ahead of Wicklow as they won the head-to-head game between the teams) | Advance to preliminary quarter-final |
| 4 | Wicklow | 3 | 1 | 0 | 2 | 51 | 56 | −5 | 2 | |

Source: GAA
Notes:

| 13 May 2023 Round 1 | Limerick | 2–16 – 1–16 | Longford | Limerick |
| 18:00 IST (UTC+1) | James Naughton 0–6 (0–5f), Brian Donovan 1–2, Cathal Downes 1–1, Peter Nash 0–2, Cian Sheehan 0–1 (0–1m), Colm McSweeney 0–1, Paul Maher 0–1, Hugh Bourke 0–1, Tommy Griffin 0–1 | Report | Dylan Farrell 0–7 (0–5f), Oran Kenny 0–3 (0–1f), Dessie Reynold 1–0, Liam Connerton 0–2, Joe Hagan 0–2, Ryan Moffett 0–1, Keelin McGann 0–1 | Stadium: TUS Gaelic Grounds; Referee: Sean Lonergan |

| 14 May 2023 Round 1 | Wicklow | 1–13 – 0–17 | Carlow | Aughrim |
| 16:00 IST (UTC+1) | Eoin Darcy 1–4 (0–1m), Conor Fee 0–4, Mark Jackson 0–3 (0–2f, 0–1 '45), Cillian McDonald 0–1, Joe Prendergast 0–1 | Report | Darragh Foley 0–7 (0–6f), Ross Dunphy 0–4, Conor Doyle 0–1 (0–1 '45), Shane Clarke 0–1, Colm Hulton 0–1, Conor Crowley 0–1, Aaron Amond 0–1, Jonah Dunne 0–1 | Stadium: Echelon Park; Referee: Seamus Mulhare |

| 20 May 2023 Round 2 | Carlow | 0–14 – 1–19 | Limerick | Carlow |
| 15:00 IST (UTC+1) | Darragh Foley 0–5 (0–5f), Jordan Morrissey 0–3, Ross Dunphy 0–2, Niall Hickey 0–1, Colm Hulton 0–1, Conor Crowley 0–1, Aaron Amond 0–1 | Report | James Naughton 0–7 (0–2f), Peter Nash 0–5, Paul Maher 1–0, Brian Donovan 0–2, Hugh Bourke 0–1 (0–1f), Cathal Downes 0–1 (0–1m), Jim Liston 0–1, Cillian Fahy 0–1, Robbie Bourke 0–1 | Stadium: Netwatch Cullen Park; Referee: Anthony Nolan |

| 20 May 2023 Round 2 | Longford | 3–17 – 2–9 | Wicklow | Longford |
| 17:00 IST (UTC+1) | Oran Kenny 0–8 (0–5f), Joe Hagan 2–0, Dylan Farrell 1–2, (0–1f), Keelin McGann 0–2, Iarla O'Sullivan 0–1, Peter Lynn 0–1, Dessie Reynolds 0–1, Aaron Farrell 0–1, Jack Macken 0–1 | Report | Eoin Darcy 1–4 (1–0 pen, 0–2f, 0–1m), Eoin Murtagh 1–0, Conor Fee 0–2, Mark Jackson 0–1 (0–1 '45), Dean Healy 0–1, John Paul Nolan 0–1 | Stadium: Glennon Brothers Pearse Park; Referee: Barry Tiernan |

| 4 June 2023 Round 3 | Limerick | 1–10 – 2–14 | Wicklow | Portlaoise |
| 13:00 IST (UTC+1) | James Naughton 0–3 (0–3f), Iain Corbett 1–0 (1–0 pen), Brian Donovan 0–2, Cian Sheehan 0–1, Hugh Bourke 0–1, Peter Nash 0–1, Cathal Downes 0–1, Killian Ryan 0–1 | Report | John Paul Nolan 1–3 (0–1f, 0–1m), Jack Kirwan 1–1, Mark Jackson 0–3 (0–3f), Conor Fee 0–3 (0–1f), Dean Healy 0–3, Mark Kenny 0–1 | Stadium: Laois Hire O'Moore Park; Referee: Brendan Griffin |

| 4 June 2023 Round 3 | Longford | 1–14 – 2–13 | Carlow | Portlaoise |
| 15:00 IST (UTC+1) | Oran Kenny 0–6 (0–3f), Dylan Farrell 0–4 (0–4f), Paddy Fox 1–0, Joe Hagan 0–2, Aaron Farrell 0–1, Darragh Doherty 0–1 | Report | Darragh Foley 0–8 (0–7f), Jamie Clarke 1–0 (1–0 pen), Mikey Bambrick 1–0, Colm Hulton 0–2, Conor Crowley 0–1, Ross Dunphy 0–1, Aaron Amond 0–1 | Stadium: Laois Hire O'Moore Park; Referee: Barry Tiernan |

=== Group 4 ===
| Pos | Team | Pld | W | D | L | PF | PA | PD | Pts | Qualification |
|---|---|---|---|---|---|---|---|---|---|---|
| 1 | Antrim | 3 | 3 | 0 | 0 | 70 | 47 | +23 | 6 | Advance to quarter-final |
| 2 | Fermanagh | 3 | 1 | 1 | 1 | 53 | 51 | +2 | 3 (Note: Fermanagh and Wexford are ranked by points difference as the head-to-head game between the teams was a draw.) | Advance to preliminary quarter-final |
| 3 | Wexford | 3 | 1 | 1 | 1 | 49 | 52 | −3 | 3 | Advance to preliminary quarter-final |
| 4 | Leitrim | 3 | 0 | 0 | 3 | 46 | 68 | −22 | 0 | |

Source: GAA
Notes:

| 14 May 2023 Round 1 | Fermanagh | 1–13 – 1–13 | Wexford | Enniskillen |
| 13:00 IST (UTC+1) | Ryan Lyons 0–6 (0–5f), Luke Flanagan 1–0 (1–0 pen), Seán McNally 0–1 (0–1 '45), Ultán Kelm 0–1 (0–1f), Brandon Horan 0–1, Ronan McCaffrey 0–1, Aidan Breen 0–1, Garvan Jones 0–1, Sean Quigley 0–1 | Report | Ben Brosnan 1–3 (1–0 pen, 0–1f), Darragh Brooke 0–2 (0–2f), Eoghan Nolan 0–2, Padraic Hughes 0–1, Cathal Walsh 0–1, Glen Malone 0–1, Niall Hughes 0–1, Kevin O'Grady 0–1, Conor Kinsella 0–1 | Stadium: Brewster Park; Referee: Barry Judge |

| 14 May 2023 Round 1 | Antrim | 3–18 – 2–12 | Leitrim | Belfast |
| 13:00 IST (UTC+1) | Adam Loughran 2–3, Dominic McEnhill 0–6 (0–5f), Ruairi McCann (Aghagallon) (1–2), Michael Byrne 0–2 (0–1f, 0–1 '45), Ronan Boyle 0–1, Conor Stewart 0–1, Ruairi McCann (Creggan) 0–1, Patrick McCormick 0–1, Peter Healy 0–1 | Report | Paul Keaney 0–4 (0–2f), Jack Heslin 1–1, Barry McNulty 1–0, Darragh Rooney 0–3, Mark Plunkett 0–1, Pearce Dolan 0–1, James Rooney 0–1, Keith Beirne 0–1 | Stadium: Corrigan Park; Referee: Barry Tiernan |

| 20 May 2023 Round 2 | Wexford | 0–14 – 2–15 | Antrim | Wexford |
| 17:30 IST (UTC+1) | Darragh Brooks 0–2 (0–1f, 0–1 '45), Ben Brosnan 0–2 (0–1f), Padraic Hughes 0–2, Kevin O'Grady 0–2, Mark Rossiter 0–2, Michael Furlong 0–1, Liam Coleman 0–1, Eoghan Nolan 0–1, Richie Waters 0–1 | Report | Dominic McEnhill 0–6 (0–1f, 0–1m), Ruairi McCann (Aghagallon) 2–0, Michael Byrne 0–5 (0–3f, 0–2 '45), Patrick Finnegan 0–2, Conor Stewart 0–1, Marc Jordan 0–1 | Stadium: Chadwicks Wexford Park; Referee: David Murnane |

| 20 May 2023 Round 2 | Leitrim | 2–7 – 1–19 | Fermanagh | Carrick-on-Shannon |
| 18:00 IST (UTC+1) | Paul Keaney 1–2 (0–2f), Mark Plunkett 1–0, Oisin McLoughlin 0–2 (0–2m), Pearce Dolan 0–1, Donal Wrynn 0–1, Tom Prior 0–1 | Report | Ryan Lyons 1–5 (0–3f), Sean Quigley 0–4 (0–2f), Ryan Jones 0–2, Garvan Jones 0–2, Luke Flanagan 0–1 (0–1m), Josh Largo Elis 0–1, Brandon Horan 0–1, Conor McShea 0–1, Tommy McCaffrey 0–1, Ultán Kelm 0–1 | Stadium: Avant Money Páirc Seán Mac Diarmada; Referee: Paul Faloon |

| 4 June 2023 Round 3 | Fermanagh | 1–12 – 3–13 | Antrim | Armagh |
| 15:00 IST (UTC+1) | Sean Quigley 0–4 (0–1f), Ultán Kelm 0–3, Ryan Lyons 1–0, Garvan Jones 0–2, Ryan Jones 0–1, Tommy McCaffrey 0–1, Ronan McCaffrey 0–1 | Report | Adam Loughran 1–3, Dominic McEnhill 0–5 (0–5f), Ruairi McCann (Aghagallon) 1–0, Oisin Doherty 1–0, Ruairi McCann (Creggan) 0–2, Michael Byrne 0–1 (0–1 '45), Patrick McCormick 0–1, Peter Healy 0–1 | Stadium: Box-It Athletic Grounds; Referee: Liam Devenney |

| 4 June 2023 Round 3 | Wexford | 1–16 – 1–12 | Leitrim | Dublin |
| 15:00 IST (UTC+1) | Darragh Brooks 0–4 (0–2f, 0–2 '45), Ben Brosnan 1–1, Mark Rossiter 0–3 (0–2f), Paraic Hughes 0–2, Glen Malone 0–1, Niall Hughes 0–1, Eoghan Nolan 0–1, Liam Coleman 0–1, Conor Kinsella 0–1, Brian Molloy 0–1 | Report | Darragh Rooney 1–4, Keith Beirne 0–5 (0–4f), Jack Heslin 0–2, Tom Prior 0–1 | Stadium: Parnell Park; Referee: Paul Faloon |

=== Ranking of third-placed teams ===
| Pos | Grp | Team | Pld | W | D | L | PF | PA | PD | Pts | Qualification |
|---|---|---|---|---|---|---|---|---|---|---|---|
| 1 | 4 | Wexford | 3 | 1 | 1 | 1 | 49 | 52 | −3 | 3 | Advance to preliminary quarter-final |
| 2 | 3 | Longford | 3 | 1 | 0 | 2 | 62 | 56 | +6 | 2 | Advance to preliminary quarter-final |
| 3 | 1 | Laois | 3 | 0 | 2 | 1 | 51 | 60 | −9 | 2 | Advance to preliminary quarter-final |
| 4 | 2 | Tipperary | 3 | 1 | 0 | 2 | 34 | 62 | −28 | 2 | |

Source: GAA

== Knockout stage ==
Preliminary quarter-finals
Down | 1–20
Longford | 1–12
Fermanagh | 1–9
Laois | 1–11
Offaly | 2–14
Wexford | 1–22
Carlow | 0–15
New York | 0–10

Quarter-finals
Cavan | 0–15
Down | 1–17
Limerick | 0–14
Laois | 1–14
Meath | 2–23
Wexford | 0–12
Antrim | 1–19
Carlow | 1–15

Semi-finals
Down | 8–16
Laois | 2–12
Meath | 2–16
Antrim | 2–14

Final
Down | 0–14
Meath | 2–13

=== Preliminary quarter-finals ===
| 10 June 2023 Preliminary quarter-final | Offaly | 2–14 – 1–22 | Wexford | Tullamore |
| 16:00 IST (UTC+1) | Anton Sullivan 1–1 (1–0 pen), Ruairi McNamee 0–3 (0–2f), Nigel Dunne 0–3 (0–1f), Bernard Allen 0–3 (0–1f), Aaron Leavy 1–0, Cian Farrell 0–2 (0–1m), Ciarán Donnelly 0–1, Peter Cunningham 0–1 | Report | Mark Rossiter 1–4, Eoghan Nolan 0–4, Brian Molloy 0–3, Kevin O’Grady 0–2, Glen Malone 0–2, Robbie Brooks 0–2, Ben Brosnan 0–2, Paraic Hughes 0–1, Niall Hughes 0–1, John Tubritt 0–1 | Stadium: Glenisk O'Connor Park; Referee: David Murnane |

| 10 June 2023 Preliminary quarter-final | Carlow | 0–15 – 0–10 | New York | Carlow |
| 17:00 IST (UTC+1) | Darragh Foley 0–7 (0–6f), Conor Doyle 0–2, Colm Hulton 0–2, Ciaran Moran 0–1, Jordan Morrissey 0–1, Conor Crowley 0–1, Seanie Bambrick 0–1 | Report | Shane Carthy 0–4 (0–3f), Gavin O'Brien 0–2, Daniel O'Sullivan 0–1, Shane Brosnan 0–1, Jack Reilly 0–1, Killian Butler 0–1 | Stadium: Netwatch Cullen Park; Referee: Sean Lonergan |

| 10 June 2023 Preliminary quarter-final | Fermanagh | 1–9 – 1–11 | Laois | Enniskillen |
| 18:00 IST (UTC+1) | Ryan Lyons 0–3 (0–1f), Sean Quigley 1–0, Shane McGullion 0–2, Luke Flanagan 0–1, Ché Cullen 0–1, Brandon Horan 0–1, Conor McGee 0–1 | Report | Mark Timmons 1–2, Paul Kingston 0–3 (0–2f), Mark Barry 0–3 (0–1f, 0–1m), Evan O'Carroll 0–3, Colm Murphy 0–1 | Stadium: Brewster Park; Referee: Barry Judge |

| 10 June 2023 Preliminary quarter-final | Down | 1–20 – 1–12 | Longford | Newry |
| 19:00 IST (UTC+1) | Pat Havern 0–6 (0–2f), Rory Mason 0–3 (0–2f), Andrew Gilmore 0–3 (0–1f), Danny Magill 1–0, Ross Carr 0–2 (0–1m), Eugene Branagan 0–2, Patrick McCarthy 0–1, Ceilum Doherty 0–1, Donagh McAleenan 0–1, Liam Kerr 0–1 | Report | Joe Hagan 1–3, Dylan Farrell 0–2 (0–1f, 0–1 '45), Darragh Doherty 0–2 (0–1m), Keelin McGann 0–2, Patrick Fox 0–1, Ryan Moffett 0–1, Dessie Reynolds 0–1 | Stadium: Páirc Esler; Referee: Anthony Nolan |

=== Quarter-finals ===
| 17 June 2023 Quarter-final | Limerick | 0–14 – 1–14 | Laois | Limerick |
| 15:00 IST (UTC+1) | James Naughton 0–5 (0–4f, 0–1m), Hugh Bourke 0–4 (0–1f), Cian Sheehan 0–2, Barry Coleman 0–1, Cathal Downes 0–1, Brian Donovan 0–1 | Report | Mark Barry 0–4 (0–2f), Colm Murphy 1–1 (0–1m), Evan O'Carroll 0–3 (0–1f, 0–1m), Patrick O'Sullivan 0–2, Killian Roche 0–1 (0–1 '45), Kieran Lillis 0–1, James Finn 0–1, Brian Daly 0–1 | Stadium: TUS Gaelic Grounds; Referee: Thomas Murphy |

| 17 June 2023 Quarter-final | Meath | 2–23 – 0–12 | Wexford | Navan |
| 16:00 IST (UTC+1) | Jordan Morris 0–6 (0–1m), James McEntee 0–6, Aaron Lynch 1–2, Matthew Costello 0–4 (0–2f), Cathal Hickey 1–0, Daithi McGowan 0–3, Jack Flynn 0–1, Eoghan Frayne 0–1 | Report | Mark Rossiter 0–2 (0–2f), Ben Brosnan 0–2 (0–2f), Eoghan Nolan 0–2, Eoin Porter 0–1, Glen Malone 0–1, Liam Coleman 0–1, Paraic Hughes 0–1, Richard Waters 0–1, Jonathan Bealin 0–1 | Stadium: Páirc Tailteann; Referee: Brendan Griffin |

| 17 June 2023 Quarter-final | Cavan | 0–15 – 1–17 | Down | Cavan |
| 17:15 IST (UTC+1) | Oisin Brady 0–8 (0–4f, 0–2m), Padraig Faulkner 0–2, Gearóid McKiernan 0–1 (0–1f), Oisín Kiernan 0–1, Cian Madden 0–1, Tiarnan Madden 0–1, Brandon Boylan 0–1 | Report | Pat Havern 0–5 (0–2f, 0–1m), Rory Mason 0–4 (0–1f), Liam Kerr 0–4, Danny Magill 1–1, Patrick McCarthy 0–1, Ryan Johnston 0–1, Shane Annett 0–1 | Stadium: Kingspan Breffni; Referee: Seamus Mulhare |

| 18 June 2023 Quarter-final | Antrim | 1–19 – 1–15 | Carlow | Belfast |
| 13:00 IST (UTC+1) | Dominic McEnhill 0–11 (0–7f), Ruairi McCann (Aghagallon) 1–0, Michael Byrne 0–2 (0–1f, 0–1 '45), Patrick McCormick 0–1, Peter Healy 0–1, Cathal Hynds 0–1, Marc Jordan 0–1, Ruairi McCann (Creggan) 0–1, Patrick Finnegan 0–1 | Report | Darragh Foley 0–8 (0–6f), Ross Dunphy 0–4, Mikey Bambrick 1–0, Conor Crowley 0–2, Niall Hickey 0–1 | Stadium: Corrigan Park; Referee: John Gilmartin |

=== Semi-finals ===
| 25 June 2023 Semi-final | Meath | 2–16 – 2–14 | Antrim | Dublin |
| 14:00 IST (UTC+1) | Jordan Morris 1–4, Aaron Lynch 1–2 (0–1m), Matthew Costello 0–4 (0–1f), Jack Flynn 0–2, Conor Gray 0–1, Jack O'Connor 0–1, James McEntee 0–1, Cathal Hickey 0–1 | Report | Dominic McEnhill 1–3 (1–0 pen, 0–2f), Patrick McBride 1–1, Adam Loughran 0–3, Michael Byrne 0–2 (0–1f, 0–1 '45), Dermot McAleese 0–2, Ruairi McCann (Creggan) 0–1, Ruairi McCann (Aghagallon) 0–1, Odhrán Eastwood 0–1 | Stadium: Croke Park; Referee: Barry Judge |

| 25 June 2023 Semi-final | Down | 8–16 – 2–12 | Laois | Dublin |
| 16:00 IST (UTC+1) | Liam Kerr 3–2, Danny Magill 2–0, Pat Havern 1–3, Rory Mason 1–1 (0–1f), Odhran Murdock 1–1, Eugene Branagan 0–3, Ceilum Doherty 0–2 (0–1m), Patrick Branagan 0–2, Niall Kane 0–1 (0–1 '45), Ryan Johnston 0–1 | Report | Mark Barry 1–6 (1–0 pen, 0–4f, 0–1m), Kevin Swayne 1–0, Eoin Lowry 0–2 (0–1m), Killian Roche 0–1 (0–1 '45), Paul Kingston 0–1, Evan O'Carroll 0–1, Dylan Kavanagh 0–1 | Stadium: Croke Park; Referee: Barry Tiernan |

=== Final ===
| 15 July 2023 Final | Down | 0–14 – 2–13 | Meath | Dublin |
| 15:00 IST (UTC+1) | Pat Havern 0–4 (0–3f), Niall Kane 0–2 (0–1f, 0–1 '45), Liam Kerr 0–2, Ryan Johnston 0–2, Ceilum Doherty 0–1, Odhran Murdock 0–1, Shealan Johnston 0–1, Andrew Gilmore 0–1 | Report | Jack O'Connor 1–2, Jack Flynn 0–4, Ronan Jones 1–1, Matthew Costello 0–3 (0–2f), Cathal Hickey 0–2, Jordan Morris 0–1 | Stadium: Croke Park; Referee: Noel Mooney (Cavan); Man of the Match: Jack Flynn (Meath) |

== Stadia and locations ==
| County | Location | Province | Stadium | Capacity |
|---|---|---|---|---|
| Antrim | Belfast | Ulster | Corrigan Park | 3,700 |
| Carlow | Carlow | Leinster | Dr Cullen Park | 21,000 |
| Cavan | Cavan | Ulster | Breffni Park | 32,000 |
| Down | Newry | Ulster | Páirc Esler | |
| Fermanagh | Enniskillen | Ulster | Brewster Park | 20,000 |
| Laois | Portlaoise | Leinster | O'Moore Park | 27,000 |
| Leitrim | Carrick-on-Shannon | Connacht | Páirc Seán Mac Diarmada | 9,331 |
| Limerick | Limerick | Munster | Gaelic Grounds | |
| London | South Ruislip | Britain | McGovern Park | 3,000 |
| Longford | Longford | Leinster | Pearse Park | 10,000 |
| Meath | Navan | Leinster | Páirc Tailteann | |
| New York | Bronx | North America | Gaelic Park | 2,000 |
| Offaly | Tullamore | Leinster | O'Connor Park | 20,000 |
| Tipperary | Thurles | Munster | Semple Stadium | 45,690 |
| Waterford | Waterford | Munster | Fraher Field | 15,000 |
| Wexford | Wexford | Leinster | Chadwicks Wexford Park | 20,000 |
| Wicklow | Aughrim | Leinster | Aughrim County Ground | 7,000 |

== Championship statistics ==
=== Scoring events ===
- Widest winning margin: 22 points
  - Down 8-16 - 2-12 Laois (Semi Final)
- Most goals in a match: 10
  - Down 8-16 - 2-12 Laois (Semi Final)
- Most points in a match: 35
  - Meath 2-23 – 0-12 Wexford (quarter-final)
- Most goals by one team in a match: 8
  - Down 8-16 - 2-12 Laois (Semi Final)
- Most points by one team in a match: 25
  - Cavan 2-25 - 2-09 Offaly (Round 3)
- Highest aggregate score: 58 points
  - Down 8-16 - 2-12 Laois (Semi Final)
- Lowest aggregate score: 25 points
  - Carlow 0-15 — 0-10 New York (preliminary quarter final)

== Miscellaneous ==
- Meath win their 1st championship in 13 years, last winning the 2010 Leinster Senior Football Championship.
- Limerick and Meath make their debuts in the Tailteann Cup.
- Carlow and New York meet in championship football for the first time.

== See also ==
- 2023 Connacht Senior Football Championship
- 2023 Leinster Senior Football Championship
- 2023 Munster Senior Football Championship
- 2023 Ulster Senior Football Championship
- 2023 All-Ireland Senior Football Championship (Tier 1)
- 2023 All-Ireland Junior Football Championship (Tier 3)
