= 2024 Connacht Senior Football Championship =

Gaelic football season

2024 Connacht SFC
Tournament details
- Year: 2024
- Date: 6 April - 5 May 2024
- Teams: 7

Winners
- Champions: Galway

Runners-up
- Runners-up: Mayo

The 2024 Connacht Senior Football Championship was the 2024 iteration of the Connacht Senior Football Championship organised by Connacht GAA.

7 teams participated in the competition. The defending champion was Galway.

== Teams ==
=== General Information ===
Seven counties competed in the Connacht Senior Football Championship:

County	Last Provincial Title	Last Championship Title	Position in 2023 Championship
Galway	2023	2001	Champions
Leitrim	1994	—	Quarter-finals
London	—	—	Quarter-finals
Mayo	2021	1951	Quarter-finals
New York	—	—	Semi-finals
Roscommon	2019	1944	Semi-finals
Sligo	2007	—	Runners-up

=== Personnel and kits ===
County	Manager	Captain(s)	Sponsors
Galway	Pádraic Joyce	Seán Kelly	Supermac's
Leitrim	Andy Moran	Donal Wrynn; Mark Diffley	Gallagher Group
London	Michael Maher	Eoin Walsh	Clayton Hotel
Mayo	Kevin McStay	Paddy Durcan	Intersport Elverys
New York	Alan O’Mara	Jamie Boyle	Navillus
Roscommon	Davy Burke	Brian Stack	Ballymore
Sligo	Tony McEntee	Niall Murphy	AbbVie

== Bracket ==
Quarter-finals

Semi-finals

Final

Leitrim
0-06

Sligo
0-15

Sligo
0-14

Galway
1-13

London
0-09

Galway
5-21

Galway
0-16

Mayo
0-15

Roscommon
0-13

Mayo
1-15

New York
2-06

Mayo
2-21

== Quarter-finals ==
6 April 2024

Report

London	0-09 (9) – (36) 5-21	Galway

McGovern Park, Ruislip
Referee: Liam Devenney (Mayo)

7 April 2024

Report

Leitrim	0-06 (6) – (15) 0-15	Sligo

Páirc Seán Mac Diarmada, Carrick-on-Shannon
Referee: Kieran Eannetta (Tyrone)
Attendance: 4,117

7 April 2024

Report

New York	2-06 (12) – (27) 2-21	Mayo

Gaelic Park, New York
Referee: Martin McNally (Monaghan)

== Semi-finals ==
20 April 2024

Report

Sligo	0-14 (14) – (16) 1-13	Galway
(HT: 0-09 – 0-06)
Pts: Niall Murphy 0-3 (1f, 1 m'), Patrick O'Connor 0-3, Alan McLoughlin 0-2, Nathan Mullen 0-1, Darragh Cummins 0-1, Sean Carrabine 0-1, Canice Mulligan 0-1, Cian Lally 0-1, Mikey Gordon 0-1		Gls: Robert Finnerty 1 Pts: Robert Finnerty (0-05, 1f), Céin Darcy (0-02), Damien Comer (0-02), Dylan McHugh (0-01), Johnny Heaney (0-01), Shane Walsh (0-01), Kieran Molloy (0-01)

Markievicz Park, Sligo
Referee: Barry Tiernan (Dublin)
Attendance: 4,597

21 April 2024

Report

Roscommon	0-13 (13) – (18) 1-15	Mayo
(HT: 0-08 – 1-06)

Dr Hyde Park, Roscommon
Referee: Sean Hurson (Tyrone)
Attendance: 13,967

== Final ==
5 May 2024
16:00
Final

Galway	0–16 – 0–15	Mayo
R. Finnerty 0-8 (5f), S. Walsh 0-3 (1f), C. Gleeson 0-2 (2f), D. Comer 0-2, J. Heaney 0-1	Report	R. O'Donoghue 0-5 (4f), M. Ruane 0-3, T. Conroy 0-2, F. Boland 0-1, D. McHugh 0-1, J. Flynn 0-1, C. O'Connor,

Pearse Stadium, Galway
Attendance: 19,193
Referee: David Gough (Meath)

== Stadia and locations ==
County	Location	Province	Stadium	Capacity
Galway	Galway	Connacht	Pearse Stadium	26,197
Leitrim	Carrick-on-Shannon	Connacht	Páirc Seán Mac Diarmada	9,331
London	South Ruislip	Britain	McGovern Park	3,000
Mayo	Castlebar	Connacht	MacHale Park	25,369
New York	Bronx	North America	Gaelic Park	2,000
Roscommon	Roscommon	Connacht	Dr Hyde Park	18,890
Sligo	Sligo	Connacht	Markievicz Park	18,558

== Statistics ==
=== Scoring events ===
- Widest winning margin: 27 points
  - London 0-09 - 5-21 Galway (Quarter-finals)
- Most goals in a match: 5
  - London 0-09 - 5-21 Galway (Quarter-finals)
- Most points in a match: 30
  - London 0-09 - 5-21 Galway (Quarter-finals)
- Most goals by one team in a match: 5
  - London 0-09 - 5-21 Galway (Quarter-finals)
- Most points by one team in a match: 21
  - London 0-09 - 5-21 Galway (Quarter-finals)
  - New York 2-06 - 2-21 Mayo (Quarter-finals)
- Highest aggregate score: 45 points
  - London 0-09 - 5-21 Galway (Quarter-finals)
- Lowest aggregate score: 21 points
  - Leitrim 0-06 - 0-15 Sligo (Quarter-finals)

== Miscellaneous ==
- It was the first Connacht final between Galway and Mayo since 2021.

== See also ==
- 2024 All-Ireland Senior Football Championship
- 2024 Leinster Senior Football Championship
- 2024 Munster Senior Football Championship
- 2024 Ulster Senior Football Championship
- 2024 Tailteann Cup (Tier 2)
- 2024 All-Ireland Junior Football Championship (Tier 3)
