= 2023 All-Ireland Junior Football Championship =

- Dates: 14 July - 16 July 2023
- Teams: 4
- Champions: New York (1st title); Danny Corcoran (captain); Johnny McGeeney (manager)
- Runners-up: Kilkenny; Jim Culleton & Mick Kenny (captain); Christy Walsh (manager)

The 2023 All-Ireland Junior Football Championship was the 91st staging of the All-Ireland Junior Football Championship since its establishment by the Gaelic Athletic Association in 1912. The championship ran from 14 July to 16 July 2023.

Kilkenny were the defending champions.

New York won the 2023 title. It was their first ever championship in football and their first piece of silverware since winning the 1966–67 National Football League.

== Format ==
Since 2022, the All-Ireland Junior Championship has been confined to just four teams; New York, Kilkenny and the winner and runner-up of the British Junior Football Championship. Prior to the change, the championship previously featured a provincial structure for all junior Gaelic football inter-county teams in Ireland.

== Teams ==
=== General Information ===
Nine counties will compete in the All-Ireland Junior Football Championship:

County	Last Provincial Title	Last Championship Title	Position in 2022 Championship
Gloucestershire	2008	—	Group Stage (Britain Junior Football Championship)
Hertfordshire	—	—	Group Stage (Britain Junior Football Championship)
Kilkenny	2018	2022	Champions
Lancashire	2016	—	Semi-finals (Britain Junior Football Championship)
London	2022	1995	Semi-finals
New York	—	—	Runners-up
Scotland	2019	—	Semi-finals (Britain Junior Football Championship)
Warwickshire	2021	—	Semi-finals
Yorkshire	—	—	Group Stage (Britain Junior Football Championship)

=== Personnel and kits ===
County	Manager	Captain(s)	Sponsor
Gloucestershire			
Hertfordshire			
Kilkenny			
Lancashire			
London			
New York			
Scotland			
Warwickshire	Charlie O’Donnell		Industria
Yorkshire			

== Provincial Championships ==
=== All-Britain Junior Football Championship ===
==== Group A ====
Pos	Team	Pld	W	D	L	SF	SA	Diff	Pts	Qualification
1	Warwickshire	3	3	0	0	6-41	4-12	+35	6	Advance to semi-finals
2	London	3	2	0	1	6-30	4-27	+9	4	Advance to semi-finals
3	Lancashire	3	1	0	2	4-29	4-35	-6	2	Advance to semi-finals
4	Scotland	3	0	0	3	3-14	7-40	-38	0	

Round 1	Warwickshire	2–12 — 0–07	Lancashire

Round 1	London	2–12 — 1–04	Scotland

Round 2	Scotland	1-08 - 3-11	Lancashire

Round 2	London	3-03 - 2-12	Warwickshire

Round 3	Scotland	1-02 - 2-17	Warwickshire

Round 3	London	1-15 - 1-11	Lancashire

==== Group B ====
Pos	Team	Pld	W	D	L	SF	SA	Diff	Pts	Qualification
1	Hertfordshire	2	2	0	0	6-14	0-05	+27	2	Advance to semi-finals
2	Yorkshire	1	0	0	1	0-05	6-14	-27	0	
3	Gloucestershire	1	0	0	1	0-00	0-00	+0	0	

Round 1	Hertfordshire	w/o - scr	Gloucestershire

Round 2	Yorkshire	0-05 - 6-14	Hertfordshire

Round 3	Gloucestershire	v	Yorkshire

==== Knockout Stage ====
Semi-Finals
Warwickshire	2-10
Hertfordshire	0-09
London	2-18
Lancashire	1-15

Final
Warwickshire	1-18
London	1-15

Semi-finals

28 May Semi-finals	Warwickshire	2–10 — 0–09	Hertfordshire

28 May Semi-finals	London	2–18 — 1–15	Lancashire

Final

Final	Warwickshire	1-18 - 1-15	London

== All-Ireland Junior Football Championship ==
=== Bracket ===
Semi-Finals
Kilkenny	1-13
London	0-15
New York	1-07
Warwickshire	0-07

Final
Kilkenny	1-09
New York	0-13

=== All-Ireland semi-finals ===
14 July 2023 Semi-final	Kilkenny	1-13 - 0-15	London	Sports Campus Ireland

14 July 2023 Semi-final	New York	1-07 - 0-07	Warwickshire	Sports Campus Ireland

=== All-Ireland final ===
16 July 2023 Final	Kilkenny	1-09 – 0-13	New York	Croke Park
	Mick Kenny 1-2 (0-2f), James Carroll 0-3 (0-1f), Mick Malone 0-1, Conor Hennessy 0-1, Ciaran Quilty 0-1, Rory Monks 0-1.	Report	Shay McElligot 0-6 (0-4f), Conor Mathers 0-3, Thomas Shalvey 0-1, CJ Molloy 0-1 (0-1f), Emmet Loughran 0-1, Brian Coughlan 0-1.	Referee: David Murnane (Cork)

== Stadia and locations ==
County	Location	Province	Stadium	Capacity
Neutral	Dublin	Leinster	Croke Park	82,300
Neutral	Blanchardstown	Leinster	Sports Campus Ireland	
Gloucestershire	Gloucester	Britain	St Peter's Rugby Football Club	
Hertfordshire	Watford	Britain	Glen Rovers Football Club	
Kilkenny	Kilkenny	Leinster	Nowlan Park	27,000
Lancashire	East Didsbury	Britain	Old Bedians	
London	South Ruislip	Britain	McGovern Park	3,000
New York	Bronx	North America	Gaelic Park	2,000
Scotland	Glasgow	Britain	Tir Conaill Harps	
Warwickshire	Solihull	Britain	Páirc na hÉireann	
Yorkshire	Leeds	Britain	John Charles Centre for Sport	

== See also ==
- 2023 Connacht Senior Football Championship
- 2023 Leinster Senior Football Championship
- 2023 Munster Senior Football Championship
- 2023 Ulster Senior Football Championship
- 2023 All-Ireland Senior Football Championship (Tier 1)
- 2023 Tailteann Cup (Tier 2)
