= 2025 All-Ireland Junior Football Championship =

- Dates: 5 April - 13 July 2025
- Teams: 5 (10 including All-Britain)
- Champions: New York (3rd title); Conor Mathers (captain)
- Runners-up: London

The 2025 All-Ireland Junior Football Championship was the 93rd staging of the All-Ireland Junior Football Championship since its establishment by the Gaelic Athletic Association in 1912.

== Format ==
Since 2022, the competition has involved Junior Gaelic football inter-county teams; Kilkenny (who do not compete in the All-Ireland Senior Football Championship), New York, and the winners and runners up from the All-Britain Junior Football Championship, played between the county teams of Britain. A second American team representing all other parts of the country outside New York, known as United States GAA, has entered the competition since 2024.

== Teams ==
County	Province	County ground	Last provincial title	Last All-Ireland title
Gloucestershire	Britain	Pontcanna Fields	2008	-
Hertfordshire	Britain	Radlett Road	2000	-
Kilkenny	Leinster	Nowlan Park	2018	2022
Lancashire	Britain	Old Bedians	2016	-
London	Britain	McGovern Park	2024	1986
New York	no official province	Gaelic Park	-	2024
Scotland	Britain	Clydebank Sports Hub	2019	-
United States	no official province	no county ground	-	-
Warwickshire	Britain	Páirc na hÉireann	2023	-
Yorkshire	Britain	Páirc Beeston	2001	-

== All-Britain Junior Football Championship ==
=== Group A ===
Pos	Team	Pld	W	D	L	SF	SA	Diff	Pts	Qualification
1	London	2	2	0	0	4-24	2-17	+13	4	Advance to semi-finals
2	Warwickshire	2	1	0	1	3-31	3-21	+10	2	Advance to semi-finals
3	Hertfordshire	2	0	0	2	1-12	3-29	-	0	Advance to semi-finals

5 April 2025 Round 1A	London	3-13 - 1-13	Warwickshire

12 April 2025 Round 2A	Warwickshire	2-18 - 0-08	Hertfordshire

3 May 2025 Round 3A	Hertfordshire	1-04 - 1-11	London

=== Group B ===
Pos	Team	Pld	W	D	L	SF	SA	Diff	Pts	Qualification
1	Lancashire	2	2	0	0	7-34	0-22	+33	2	Advance to semi-finals
3	Yorkshire	1	0	0	1	0-11	4-14	-15	0	
2	Scotland	1	0	0	1	0-11	3-20	-18	0	
4	Gloucestershire	0	0	0	0	0-00	0-00	0	0	

5 April 2025 Round 2A	Yorkshire	0-11 - 4-14	Lancashire

5 April 2025 Round 2A	Scotland	v	Gloucestershire

12 April 2025 Round 2B	Gloucestershire	v	Yorkshire

12 April 2025 Round 2B	Lancashire	3-20 - 0-11	Scotland

3 May 2025 Round 3B	Scotland	v	Yorkshire

3 May 2025 Round 3B	Gloucestershire	v	Lancashire

=== Semi-finals ===
1 June 2025 2025 All-Britain JFC semi-final 1	London	2-17 - 1-12	Lancashire	Páirc na hÉireann, Warwickshire
				Referee: James Kilroy

1 June 2025 2025 All-Britain JFC semi-final 2	Warwickshire	3-22 - 0-08	Hertfordshire	McGovern Park, London
				Referee: Rory McGeown

=== Final ===
22 June 2025 2025 All-Britain JFC final	London	1-14 - 1-13	Warwickshire	Páirc na hÉireann, Warwickshire
				Referee: Rory McGeown

== All-Ireland Junior Football Championship ==
=== Quarter-final ===
14 June 2025 2025 All-Ireland JFC quarter-final	New York	2-8 - 2-7	United States	Gaelic Park, New York
				Referee: Sean Hurson

=== Semi-finals ===
11 July 2025 2025 All-Ireland JFC semi-final 1	New York	2-12 - 1-11	Warwickshire	Abbotstown, Dublin
	Jack Healy 1-02; Brian Coughlan 0-05 (3fs, 1 45)); Colm Shalvey 1-00; Lorcan Kennedy 0-02; Ian Kavanagh 0-01; Aaron Traynor 0-01; Emmet Loughran 0-01	Report	Jack Keogh 1-02; Jack Gillespie 0-05 (3fs); Michael Mannion 0-02; Louis Monaghan 0-01; Declan Staunton 0-01	Referee: Diarmuid Boylan

11 July 2025 2025 All-Ireland JFC semi-final 2	Kilkenny	0-17 - 1-17	London	Abbotstown, Dublin
	James Carroll 0-08 (1tpf, 5sf); Darragh Hartley 0-02 (tp); Walter Walsh 0-02; Mick Malone 0-01; Fionn Cody 0-01; Caleb Roche 0-01; Dylan Simpson 0-01; Karl Downey 0-01 (45)	Report	Noel Maher 0-09 (3 tpf, 1 tp); Ali Carney 1-01; Sean Hickey 0-02; Caolan Doyle 0-02 (tp); Conor Redican 0-02 (2fs); Christopher Morris 0-01	Referee: Andrew Smith

=== Final ===
13 July 2025 2025 All-Ireland JFC final	New York	0-20 - 2-13	London	Croke Park, Dublin
	Brian Coughlan 0-09 (1tpf, 2fs, 2 45s); Gearoid Kennedy 0-04 (2 tp); Emmet Loughran 0-02; Danny Corridan 0-01; Ian Kavanagh 0-01; Garvin Lee 0-01; Jack Healy 0-01; Lorcan Kennedy 0-01	Report	Conor Redican 1-03 (3fs); Noel Maher 0-04 (2 tp); Ali Carney 1-00; Caolan Doyle 0-02 (tp); Christopher Morris 0-01; Eoin McGivney 0-01; Sean Hickey 0-01; Ryan O'Connell 0-01	Referee: Seamus Mulhare

== See also ==
- 2025 All-Ireland Senior Football Championship
- 2025 Tailteann Cup
- 2025 Connacht Senior Football Championship
- 2025 Leinster Senior Football Championship
- 2025 Munster Senior Football Championship
- 2025 Ulster Senior Football Championship
