= Provincial =

Provincial may refer to:

== Government and administration ==
- Provincial capitals, an administrative sub-national capital of a country
- Provincial city (disambiguation)
- Provincial minister (disambiguation)
- Provincial Secretary, a position in Canadian government
- Member of Provincial Parliament (disambiguation), a title for legislators in Ontario, Canada as well as Eastern Cape Province, South Africa.
- Provincial council (disambiguation), various meanings
- Sub-provincial city in the People's Republic of China

== Companies ==
- The Provincial sector of British Rail, which was later renamed Regional Railways
- Provincial Airlines, a Canadian airline
- Provincial Insurance Company, a former insurance company in the United Kingdom

== Other uses ==
- Provincial Osorno, a football club from Chile
- Provincial examinations, a school-leaving exam in British Columbia, Canada
- A provincial superior of a religious order
- Provincial park, the equivalent of national parks in the Canadian provinces
- Provincial Reconstruction Team, a military unit used by Western forces in Afghanistan
- Provincial Court, a type of law court in Canada
- Provincial symbols such as those of Canada
- Provincial Letters, a series of letters by French philosopher Blaise Pascal
- Provincial (album), the first solo album by John K. Samson

== See also ==
- Province (disambiguation)
- Vice-provincial (disambiguation)
- La provinciale (disambiguation)
