= 2024 All-Ireland Junior Football Championship =

- Teams: 5 (10 including All-Britain)
- Champions: New York (2nd title)
- Runners-up: London

The 2024 All-Ireland Junior Football Championship was the 92nd staging of the All-Ireland Junior Football Championship since its establishment by the Gaelic Athletic Association in 1912.

== Format ==
Since 2022, the competition has involved Junior Gaelic football inter-county teams; Kilkenny (who do not compete in the All-Ireland Senior Football Championship), New York, and the winners and runners up from the All-Britain Junior Football Championship, played between the county teams of Britain.

A second American team representing all other parts of the country outside New York, known as United States GAA, entered the competition for the first time in 2024.

== Teams ==
County	Province	County ground	Last provincial title	Last All-Ireland title
Gloucestershire	Britain	Pontcanna Fields	2008	-
Hertfordshire	Britain	Radlett Road	2000	-
Kilkenny	Leinster	Nowlan Park	2018	2022
Lancashire	Britain	Old Bedians	2016	-
London	Britain	McGovern Park	2022	1986
New York	no official province	Gaelic Park	-	2023
Scotland	Britain	Clydebank Sports Hub	2019	-
United States	no official province	no county ground	-	-
Warwickshire	Britain	Páirc na hÉireann	2023	-
Yorkshire	Britain	Páirc Beeston	2001	-

== All-Britain Junior Football Championship ==
=== Group A ===
Pos	Team	Pld	W	D	L	SF	SA	Diff	Pts	Qualification
1	London	0	0	0	0	0-00	0-00	0	0	Advance to semi-finals
2	Warwickshire	0	0	0	0	0-00	0-00	0	0	Advance to semi-finals
3	Hertfordshire	0	0	0	0	0-00	0-00	0	0	Advance to semi-finals
4	Lancashire	0	0	0	0	0-00	0-00	0	0	

30 March 2024 Round 1A	Lancashire	0-05 - 3-13	Hertfordshire	Páirc na hÉireann, Warwickshire

30 March 2024 Round 1A	Warwickshire	1-08 - 1-03	London	Radlett Road, Hertfordshire

6 April 2024 Round 2A	Warwickshire	v	Lancashire	Páirc na hÉireann, Warwickshire
Note: Lancashire concede, win awarded to Warwickshire

6 April 2024 Round 2A	London	3-14 - 0-05	Hertfordshire	McGovern Park, London

4 May 2024 Round 3A	Lancashire	v	London	Old Bedians, Lancashire
Note: Lancashire concede, win awarded to London

4 May 2024 Round 3A	Hertfordshire	v	Warwickshire	Radlett Road, Hertfordshire

=== Group B ===
Pos	Team	Pld	W	D	L	SF	SA	Diff	Pts	Qualification
1	Yorkshire	0	0	0	0	0-00	0-00	0	0	
2	Scotland	0	0	0	0	0-00	0-00	0	0	
3	Gloucestershire	0	0	0	0	0-00	0-00	0	0	

13 April 2024 Round 1B	Scotland	v	Yorkshire
Note: Yorkshire concede, win awarded to Scotland

13 April 2024 Round 2B	Gloucestershire	0-10 - 4-09	Scotland	Waterhall Road, Gloucestershire

4 May 2024 Round 3B	v

=== Semi-finals ===
26 May 2024 2024 All-Britain JFC semi-final 1	London	0-10 - 0-05	Hertfordshire	McGovern Park, London

26 May 2024 2024 All-Britain JFC semi-final 2	Scotland	v	Warwickshire

=== Final ===
9 June 2024 2024 All-Britain JFC final	London	2-10 - 0-10	Warwickshire	McGovern Park, London

== All-Ireland Junior Football Championship ==
=== Quarter-final ===
29 June 2024 2024 All-Ireland JFC quarter-final	Warwickshire	v	Kilkenny	Páirc na hÉireann, Warwickshire

=== Semi-finals ===
12 July 2024 2024 All-Ireland JFC semi-final 1	Warwickshire	0-08 - 0-11	New York	Abbotstown, Dublin

12 July 2024 2024 All-Ireland JFC semi-final 2	London	1-08 - 0-10	United States	Abbotstown, Dublin

=== Final ===
15 July 2024 2024 All-Ireland JFC final	London	0-12 - 013	New York	Croke Park, Dublin

== See also ==
- 2024 All-Ireland Senior Football Championship
- 2024 Tailteann Cup
- 2024 Connacht Senior Football Championship
- 2024 Leinster Senior Football Championship
- 2024 Munster Senior Football Championship
- 2024 Ulster Senior Football Championship
