= 2023 Connacht Senior Football Championship =

Gaelic football season

2023 Connacht SFC
Tournament details
- Year: 2023

Winners
- Champions: Galway (49th win)

Runners-up
- Runners-up: Sligo

Other
- Matches played: 6

The 2023 Connacht Senior Football Championship was the 2023 iteration of the Connacht Senior Football Championship organised by Connacht GAA.

7 teams competed in the championship. Galway were the defending champions.

== Teams ==
=== General Information ===
Seven counties will compete in the Connacht Senior Football Championship:

County	Last Provincial Title	Last Championship Title	Position in 2022 Championship
Galway	2022	2001	Champions
Leitrim	1994	—	Semi-finals
London	—	—	Quarter-finals
Mayo	2021	1951	Quarter-finals
New York	—	—	Quarter-finals
Roscommon	2019	1944	Runners-up
Sligo	2007	—	Semi-finals

=== Personnel and kits ===
County	Manager	Captain(s)	Sponsors
Galway	Pádraic Joyce	Seán Kelly	Supermac's
Leitrim	Andy Moran	Donal Wrynn	J. P. Clarke's Saloon, New York
London	Michael Maher	Liam Gavaghan	Clayton Hotel
Mayo	Kevin McStay	Paddy Durcan	Intersport Elverys
New York	Johnny McGeeney	Johnny Glynn	Navillus
Roscommon	Davy Burke	Brian Stack	Ballymore
Sligo	Tony McEntee	Keelan Cawley	AbbVie

== Bracket ==
Quarter-finals

Semi-finals

Final

London
0-12

Sligo
2-20

Sligo
2-16

New York
0-06

New York
0-15 (2)

Leitrim
0-15 (0)

Sligo
0-12

Galway
2-20

Roscommon
2-08

Mayo
0-10

Roscommon
1-09

Galway
1-13

== Quarter-finals ==
8 April 2023; 15:00; Quarter-final	London	0-12 - 2-20	Sligo	McGovern Park, Ruislip; Referee: Brendan Cawley (Kildare)
8 April 2023; 15:00; Quarter-final	Christopher Farley (0-6, 6f), Aidan McLoughlin (0-2), Enda Lynn (0-1), Christopher Duggan (0-1), Liam Gavaghan (0-1), Conal Gallagher (0-1)	Report	Pat Spillane (1-4), Sean Carrabine (1-1,1f), Niall Murphy 0-3, 1f), Patrick O'Connor (0-3, 1m), Cian Lally (0-3), Paul Kilcoyne (0-1), Paul McNamara (0-1), Luke Towey (0-1), Nathan Mullen (0-1), Donal Conlon (0-1), Alan Reilly (0-1,1f)	McGovern Park, Ruislip; Referee: Brendan Cawley (Kildare)

8 April 2023; 18:00 EDT (UTC−04:00); Quarter-final	New York	0-15 – 0-15 (aet); 2–0 pens	Leitrim	Gaelic Park, New York; Referee: David Coldrick (Meath)
8 April 2023; 18:00 EDT (UTC−04:00); Quarter-final	Connell Ahearne 0-4 (0-2f, 0-2m), Shane Carthy 0-3, (0-1f), Mick Cunningham 0-1 (0-1f), Shane Brosnan 0-1, Adrian Varley 0-2 (0-1f), Mikey Brosnan 0-1, Peter Fox 0-1, Daniel O’Sullivan 0-1, Jack Reilly 0-1.	Report	Keith Beirne 0-9, (0-5f, 0-1m), Evan Sweeney 0-3, Mark Plunkett 0-2, Paul Keaney 0-1 (0-1f)	Gaelic Park, New York; Referee: David Coldrick (Meath)

9 April 2023; 16:00; Quarter-final	Mayo	0-10 - 2-8	Roscommon	McHale Park, Castlebar; Attendance: 19,361; Referee: Noel Mooney (Cavan)
9 April 2023; 16:00; Quarter-final	Colm Reape 0-2 (2fs), Ryan O’Donoghue 0-2 (2fs), Paddy Durcan 0-1, Donnacha McHugh 0-1, Matthew Ruane 0-1, Tommy Conroy 0-1, Aidan O’Shea 0-1, Cillian O’Connor 0-1.	Report	Diarmuid Murtagh 0-6 (4fs), Enda Smith 1-1 (1-0 pen), Donie Smith 1-0, Conor Cox 0-1.	McHale Park, Castlebar; Attendance: 19,361; Referee: Noel Mooney (Cavan)

== Semi-finals ==
23 April 2023; 16:00; Semi-final	Roscommon	1-9 - 1-13	Galway	Dr Hyde Park, Roscommon; Attendance: 16,917; Referee: David Gough (Meath); Man of the Match: Ciarán Murtagh
23 April 2023; 16:00; Semi-final		Report		Dr Hyde Park, Roscommon; Attendance: 16,917; Referee: David Gough (Meath); Man of the Match: Ciarán Murtagh

22 April 2023; 14:30; Semi-final	Sligo	2-16 - 0-6	New York	Markievicz Park, Sligo; Attendance: 5,677; Referee: Barry Cassidy (Derry)
22 April 2023; 14:30; Semi-final		Report		Markievicz Park, Sligo; Attendance: 5,677; Referee: Barry Cassidy (Derry)

== Final ==
7 May 2023; 13:45; Final	Sligo	0-12 - 2-20	Galway	McHale Park, Castlebar; Attendance: 11,867; Referee: Brendan Cawley (Kildare); Man of the Match: Matthew Tierney
7 May 2023; 13:45; Final		Report		McHale Park, Castlebar; Attendance: 11,867; Referee: Brendan Cawley (Kildare); Man of the Match: Matthew Tierney

== Stadia and locations ==
County	Location	Province	Stadium	Capacity
Galway	Galway	Connacht	Pearse Stadium	26,197
Leitrim	Carrick-on-Shannon	Connacht	Páirc Seán Mac Diarmada	9,331
London	South Ruislip	Britain	McGovern Park	3,000
Mayo	Castlebar	Connacht	MacHale Park	25,369
New York	Bronx	North America	Gaelic Park	2,000
Roscommon	Roscommon	Connacht	Dr Hyde Park	18,890
Sligo	Sligo	Connacht	Markievicz Park	18,558

== Statistics ==
=== Scoring events ===
- Widest winning margin: 16 points
  - Sligo 2-16 - 0-06 New York (Semi-finals)
- Most goals in a match: 2
  - Sligo 2-20 - 0-12 London (Quarter-finals)
  - Roscommon 2-08 - 0-10 Mayo (Quarter-finals)
  - Sligo 2-16 - 0-06 New York (Semi-finals)
  - Roscommon 1-09 - 1-13 Galway (Semi-finals)
  - Sligo 0-12 - 2-20 Galway (Final)
- Most points in a match: 32
  - Sligo 2-20 - 0-12 London (Quarter-finals)
  - Sligo 0-12 - 2-20 Galway (Final)
- Most goals by one team in a match: 2
  - Sligo 2-20 - 0-12 London (Quarter-finals)
  - Roscommon 2-08 - 0-10 Mayo (Quarter-finals)
  - Sligo 2-16 - 0-06 New York (Semi-finals)
  - Sligo 0-12 - 2-20 Galway (Final)
- Most points by one team in a match: 20
  - Sligo 2-20 - 0-12 London (Quarter-finals)
  - Sligo 0-12 - 2-20 Galway (Final)
- Highest aggregate score: 38 points
  - Sligo 2-20 - 0-12 London (Quarter-finals)
  - Sligo 0-12 - 2-20 Galway (Final)
- Lowest aggregate score: 24 points
  - Roscommon 2-08 - 0-10 Mayo (Quarter-finals)

== Miscellaneous ==
- New York won their first ever Connacht Senior Football Championship game.
- Sligo qualify to their first Connacht final since 2015.
- Its the first Connacht final between Galway and Sligo since 2007.
- Due to the impact of the COVID-19 pandemic on Gaelic games in 2020, it took an extra three years for Galway to play Sligo.

== See also ==
- 2023 All-Ireland Senior Football Championship
- 2023 Leinster Senior Football Championship
- 2023 Munster Senior Football Championship
- 2023 Ulster Senior Football Championship
- 2023 Tailteann Cup (Tier 2)
- 2023 All-Ireland Junior Football Championship (Tier 3)
