= Provence (disambiguation) =

Provence is a region of southeastern France on the Mediterranean Sea.

Provence may also refer to :

- Kingdom of Provence, a historical kingdom (879-882) in West Francia which became Lower Burgundy
- County of Provence, a county annexed to France in the 1480s
- Provence, Switzerland, a municipality in the canton of Vaud in Switzerland
- SS La Provence, an ocean liner launched in 1905
- French ship Provence, various ships of the French Navy
- La Provence, the main daily newspaper in Provence
- Auberge la Provence, Dutch former Michelin starred restaurant in Laren
- Andrew Provence (born 1961), American football player
- La Provence (restaurant), Dutch Michelin starred restaurant in Driebergen-Rijsenburg

== See also ==
- Province (disambiguation)
