= 2025 Connacht Senior Football Championship =

Gaelic football tournament

2025 Connacht SFC
Tournament details
- Province: Connacht
- Year: 2025
- Trophy: Nestor Cup
- Date: 5 April – 4 May 2025
- Defending champions: Galway

Winners
- Champions: Galway

Runners-up
- Runners-up: Mayo

The 2025 Connacht Senior Football Championship was the 2025 iteration of the annual Connacht Senior Football Championship organised by Connacht GAA. It was one of the four provincial competitions of the 2025 All-Ireland Senior Football Championship. The winning team received the Nestor Cup. The draw for the competition was made on 12 October 2024. The defending champion was Galway.

== Teams ==
=== General Information ===
Seven counties competed in the Connacht Senior Football Championship:

County	Last Provincial Title	Last Championship Title	Position in 2024 Championship
Galway	2024	2001	Champions
Leitrim	1994	—	Quarter-finals
London	—	—	Quarter-finals
Mayo	2021	1951	Runners-up
New York	—	—	Quarter-finals
Roscommon	2019	1944	Semi-finals
Sligo	2007	—	Semi-finals

=== Personnel and kits ===
County	Manager	Captain(s)	Sponsors
Galway	Pádraic Joyce	Seán Kelly	Supermac's
Leitrim	Andy Moran	Donal Wrynn; Mark Diffley	Gallagher Group
London	Michael Maher	Eoin Walsh	Clayton Hotel
Mayo	Kevin McStay	Paddy Durcan	Intersport Elverys
New York	Alan O’Mara	Jamie Boyle	Navillus
Roscommon	Davy Burke	Brian Stack	Ballymore
Sligo	Tony McEntee	Niall Murphy	AbbVie

== Draw ==
=== Predetermined matches ===
- London v Roscommon
- New York v Galway

=== Main draw ===
- Leitrim
- Mayo
- Sligo

== Bracket ==
Quarter-finals
5 April, Ruislip
London	0-13
Roscommon	2-26
6 April, New York City
New York	0-20
Galway	3-28
6 April, Castlebar
Mayo	2-20
Sligo	2-17

Semi-finals
20 April, Galway
Roscommon	0-18
Galway	1-24
19 April, Carrick-on-Shannon
Mayo	0-20
Leitrim	0-13

Final
4 May, Castlebar
Galway	1-17
Mayo	1-15

== Quarter-finals ==
=== Matches ===
5 April 2025 Quarter-final	London	0-13 – 2-26	Roscommon	Ruislip
				Venue: McGovern Park
	Pts: Eoin Walsh 1, Liam Gallagher 2 (1tp), Daniel Clarke 2 (1tp), Kristian Healy 1, Ciaran Diver 3 (1f), Shay Rafter 4 (2fs)	Report	Gls: Diarmuid Murtagh 1, Ciaráin Murtagh 1 Pts: Ruaidhrí Fallon 1, Dylan Ruane 2, Eddie Nolan 1, Keith Doyle 1, Enda Smith 2, Ben O'Carroll 7 (1tp, 1f), Diarmuid Murtagh 1, Cian McKeon 3, Ciaráin Murtagh 5 (1tp), Cathal Heneghan 2 (1tp)	Referee: Thomas Murphy (Galway)

6 April 2025 Quarter-final	New York	0-20 – 3-28	Galway	New York
3pm EST (Irish time: 8pm GMT)				Venue: Gaelic Park
	Pts: C O'Dea 1, J Walsh 2 (1tp), K Murphy 1, F O'Reilly 7 (3tpfs, 1f), J Robinson 5, B O'Regan 4 (2fs, 1tpf)	Report	Gls: C Hernon 1, M Tierney 2 Pts: C Flaherty 2 (1tp), K Molloy 1, S Kelly 2, M Tierney 4 (1f, 1 tpf), J Maher 1, M Thompson 3, C McDaid 1, D O'Flaherty 2, Brian Mannion 1, R Finnerty 6 (3fs), F Ó Laoi 1, P Conroy 2 (1tpf), L Ó Conghaile 2	Referee: Joe McQuillan (Cavan)

6 April 2025 Quarter-final	Mayo	2-20 – 2-17	Sligo	Castlebar
				Venue: MacHale Park
	Gls: Aidan O'Shea 1, Ryan O'Donoghue 1 Pts: Enda Hession 1, Jack Carney 2, Matthew Ruane 1, David Neary 1, Darren McHale 4, Aidan O'Shea 3, Dylan Thornton 1, Ryan O'Donoghue 4 (4f), Fergal Boland 2, Conal Dawson 1	Report	Gls: Luke Towey 1, Cian Lally 1 Pts: Cian Lally 1, David Quinn 1, Alan McLoughlin 5 (1tp,1f), Niall Murphy 7 (1tp), Pat Spillane 2, Oisin Flynn 1	Referee: Noel Mooney (Cavan)

== Semi-finals ==
=== Matches ===
19 April 2025 Semi-final	Leitrim	0-13 – 0-20	Mayo	Carrick on Shannon
				Venue: Páirc Seán Mac Diarmada

20 April 2025 Semi-final	Galway	1-24 – 0-18	Roscommon	Galway
				Venue: Pearse Stadium

== Final ==
=== Connacht final ===
4 May 2025 Final	Mayo	1-15 – 1-17	Galway	Castlebar
				Venue: McHale Park
				Referee: Paddy Neilan (Roscommon)

== Statistics ==
=== Scoring events ===
- Widest winning margin: 19 points
  - London 0–13 — 2–26 Roscommon (Quarter-finals)
- Most goals in a match: 4
  - Mayo 2–20 — 2–17 Sligo (Quarter-finals)
- Most points in a match: 48
  - New York 0–20 — 3–28 Galway (Quarter-finals)
- Most goals by one team in a match: 3
  - New York 0–20 — 3–28 Galway (Quarter-finals)
- Most points by one team in a match: 28
  - New York 0–20 — 3–28 Galway (Quarter-finals)
- Highest aggregate score: 57 points
  - New York 0–20 — 3–28 Galway (Quarter-finals)
- Lowest aggregate score: 33 points
  - Mayo 0–20 — 0–13 Leitrim (Semi-finals)

== Miscellaneous ==
- Due to the impact of the COVID-19 pandemic on Gaelic games in 2020, it took an extra five years for Galway to play New York and Roscommon to play London.
