= Ciarán Wallace =

Irish hurler

Personal information
- Native name: Ciarán de Bhailís (Irish)
- Born: 1995 (age 30–31) Castlecomer, County Kilkenny, Ireland
- Occupation: Garda Síochána

Sport
- Sport: Hurling
- Position: Left wing-back
Club
- Years: Club
- Erin's Own
Club titles
- Kilkenny titles: 0
College
- Years: College
- Garda Síochána College
College titles
- Fitzgibbon titles: 0
Inter-county
- Years: County
- 2016–present: Kilkenny
Inter-county titles
- Leinster titles: 0
- All-Irelands: 0
- NHL: 0
- All Stars: 0

Ciarán Wallace (born 1995) is an Irish hurler who plays for Kilkenny Intermediate Championship club Erin's Own and at inter-county level with the Kilkenny senior hurling team. He usually lines out as a left corner-back.

== Honours ==
Kilkenny

- All-Ireland Junior Football Championship: 2022
- Leinster Minor Hurling Championship (1): 2013
