= La provinciale =

La provinciale (Romance languages: the provincial), or, les provinciales, and variations, can refer to:

- La provinciale (1953 film), a 1953 Italian film (English title The Wayward Wife)
- La provinciale (1981 film), a 1981 French-Swiss film
- Il provinciale (1971 film), a 1971 Italian film (Italian: The Provincial)
- La Provinciale (Marivaux), an 18th-century stageplay by Marivaux
- Les Provinciales (or, Lettres provinciales; French: Provincial Letters), a series of 1650s letters written by Blaise Pascal

== See also ==
- Pleurosternon provinciale (P. provinciale), a turtle species
- Polysternon provinciale (P. provinciale), a turtle species
- Provincial (disambiguation)
- Province (disambiguation)
