= MPPs =

MPPS can stand for:

- Massively Parallel Processing
- Member of Provincial Parliament (disambiguation), in Canada and South Africa
- Million Packets Per Second (referring to throughput for switches and/or routers)
- Modality Performed Procedure Step (used in DICOM, Medical imaging)
- Most Penetrating Particle Size (used in HEPA)
- Mandal Parishad Primary Schools State Government Schools of India.
