= Eparchy (disambiguation) =

Eparchy is an ecclesiastical unit in Eastern Christianity.

The term may also refer to:

- Eparchy (Roman province), a Greek term for a province, in the Roman Republic and Empire
- Eparchy (Byzantine province), a Greek term for a province, in the early Byzantine Empire
- Praetorian eparchy, a Greek term for a praetorian prefecture, in the late Roman and early Byzantine empires
- Urban eparchy, a Greek term for jurisdiction under the praefectus urbi, in Constantinople and Rome
- Eparchy (modern Greece), an administrative unit in modern Greece
- Eparchy (modern Cyprus), an administrative unit in modern Cyprus

== See also ==
- List of urban prefects of Constantinople
- Province (disambiguation)
