= 2024 Ulster Senior Football Championship =

Gaelic football tournament

2024 Ulster SFC
Tournament details
- Province: Ulster
- Year: 2024
- Trophy: Anglo-Celt Cup
- Date: April – May 2024
- Defending champions: Derry

Winners
- Champions: Donegal (11th win)
- Manager: Jim McGuinness

Runners-up
- Runners-up: Armagh
- Captain: Aidan Forker

Other
- Matches played: 8
- Website: Ulster GAA

The 2024 Ulster Senior Football Championship was the 136th installment of the annual Ulster Senior Football Championship organised by Ulster GAA. It was one of the four provincial competitions of the 2024 All-Ireland Senior Football Championship. The winning team received the Anglo-Celt Cup. The draw for the championship was made on 21 October 2023. The defending champion was Derry; however, Derry conceded four goals to Donegal and heavily lost the opening game of its title defence.

== Teams ==
=== General information ===
Nine counties competed in the Ulster Senior Football Championship:

County	Last Championship title	Last All-Ireland SFC title	Position in 2023 Championship
Antrim	1951	—N/a	Preliminary round
Armagh	2008	2002	Runners-up
Cavan	2020	1952	Quarter-finals
Derry	2023	1993	Champions
Donegal	2019	2012	Quarter-finals
Down	1994	1994	Semi-finals
Fermanagh	—N/a	—N/a	Quarter-finals
Monaghan	2015	—N/a	Semi-finals
Tyrone	2021	2021	Quarter-finals

=== Personnel and kits ===
County	Manager	Captain(s)	Sponsor(s)
Antrim	Andy McEntee	Peter Healy	Fibrus
Armagh	Kieran McGeeney	Aidan Forker	Simply Fruit
Cavan	Mickey Graham	Raymond Galligan	Kingspan Group
Derry	Mickey Harte	Conor Glass	Errigal Contracts
Donegal	Jim McGuinness	Paddy McBrearty	Circet
Down	Conor Laverty	Pierce Laverty	EOS IT Solutions
Fermanagh	Kieran Donnelly	Declan McCusker	Tracey Concrete
Monaghan	Vinny Corey	Kieran Duffy	All Boro Floor Services
Tyrone	Feargal Logan and Brian Dooher	Peter Harte, Brian Kennedy	McAleer & Rushe Ltd

== Draw ==
=== Pot 1 (Preliminary round pot) ===
2 out of the 5 teams out of this list were drawn for the preliminary round.

- Cavan
- Derry
- Donegal
- Down
- Monaghan

=== Pot 2 (Quarter-finals pot) ===
- Antrim
- Armagh
- Fermanagh
- Tyrone

== Bracket ==
Preliminary round

Quarter-finals

Semi-finals

Final

Down
0–13

Antrim
0–9

Down
2–6

Armagh
0–13

Fermanagh
0–9

Armagh
3–11

Armagh
0–20 (5)

Donegal
0–20 (6)

Derry
0–17

Donegal
4–11

Donegal
0–18

Monaghan
1–12

Tyrone
0–16

Cavan
3–12

Cavan
3–16

Tyrone
1–23*

== Preliminary round ==
7 April 2024
16:00
Preliminary round

Monaghan	1–12 (15) – (21) 3–12	Cavan
Hamill 1-0, Beggan 0-3 (1f, 1 '45), McManus 0-3 (2f), McCarron 0-2(1f), O'Connell 0-1, Garland 0-1, Wilson 0-1, Jones 0-1(1m)	Report	Lynch 1-9 (7f, 1 '45), G Smith 1-1, Faulkner 1-0, O'Connell 0-1, Madden 0-1

St Tiernach's Park, Clones
Attendance: 8,324
Referee: Brendan Cawley (Kildare)

== Quarter-finals ==
13 April 2024
Quarter-final

Down	0–13 (13) – (9) 0–9	Antrim

Páirc Esler, Newry
Attendance: 5,429
14 April 2024
Quarter-final

Fermanagh	0–9 (9) – (20) 3–11	Armagh

Brewster Park, Enniskillen
Attendance: 7,096
20 April 2024
Quarter-final

Derry	0–17 (17) – (23) 4–11	Donegal

Celtic Park, Derry
Attendance: 14,714
21 April 2024
Quarter-final

Cavan	3–16 (25) – (26) 1–23 (a.e.t.)	Tyrone

Breffni Park, Cavan
Attendance: 9,952

== Semi-finals ==
27 April 2024
Semi-final

Down	2–6 (12) – (13) 0–13	Armagh
	Report

St Tiernach's Park, Clones
Attendance: 12,116
28 April 2024
Semi-final

Donegal	0–18 (18) – (16) 0–16 (a.e.t.)	Tyrone
	Report

Celtic Park, Derry
Attendance: 14,714
Referee: Brendan Cawley (Kildare)

== Final ==
12 May 2024
Final

Armagh	0–20–0–20 (a.e.t.)	Donegal
	Report
Penalties
	5–6

St Tiernach's Park, Clones
Attendance: 28,896
Referee: Martin McNally (Monaghan)
- The Ulster champion and Ulster runner-up qualified for the All-Ireland Senior Football Championship group stage.

== Stadia and attendance ==
County	Location	Province	Stadium	Capacity
Antrim	Belfast	Ulster	Corrigan Park	3,700
Armagh	Armagh	Ulster	Athletic Grounds	18,500
Cavan	Cavan	Ulster	Breffni Park	25,030
Derry	Derry	Ulster	Celtic Park	18,500
Donegal	Ballybofey	Ulster	MacCumhaill Park	17,500
Down	Newry	Ulster	Páirc Esler	20,000
Fermanagh	Enniskillen	Ulster	Brewster Park	20,000
Monaghan	Clones	Ulster	St Tiernach's Park	29,000
Tyrone	Omagh	Ulster	Healy Park	17,636

Total attendance	101,241
Average attendance	12,655
Highest attendance	28,896; Armagh 0–20 – 0–20 Donegal; 5–6; 12 May 2024

== Statistics ==
=== Scoring events ===
Does not include scores in extra time.

- Widest winning margin: 11 points
  - Fermanagh 0–9 – 3–11 Armagh (quarter-final)
- Most goals in a match: 4
  - Monaghan 1–12 – 3–12 Cavan (preliminary round)
  - Derry 0–17 – 4–11 Donegal (quarter-final)
- Most points in a match: 34
  - Cavan 3–14 – 1–20 Tyrone (quarter-final)
- Most goals by one team in a match: 4
  - Derry 0–17 – 4–11 Donegal (quarter-final)
- Most points by one team in a match: 20
  - Cavan 3–14 – 1–20 Tyrone (quarter-final)
- Highest aggregate score: 46 points
  - Cavan 3–14 – 1–20 Tyrone (quarter-final)
- Lowest aggregate score: 22 points
  - Down 0–13 – 0–9 Antrim (quarter-final)

== Miscellaneous ==
- Donegal became the first team to defeat Derry in the Ulster Championship since 2021 where Donegal also defeated the Oak Leafers.
- Donegal also defeated Derry in Derry's next Ulster Championship game, in the preliminary round of 2025.

== See also ==
- 2024 All-Ireland Senior Football Championship
- 2024 Connacht Senior Football Championship
- 2024 Leinster Senior Football Championship
- 2024 Munster Senior Football Championship
- 2024 Tailteann Cup (Tier 2)
- 2024 All-Ireland Junior Football Championship (Tier 3)
