= 1966–67 National Football League (Ireland) =

Gaelic football competition

League details
- Dates: October 1966 – 21 May 1967

League champions
- Winners: New York (3rd win)
- Captain: Kenny Finn

League runners-up
- Runners-up: Galway
- Captain: Paddy Cummins

The 1966–67 National Football League was the 36th staging of the National Football League (NFL), an annual Gaelic football tournament for the Gaelic Athletic Association county teams of Ireland.

Three-in-a-row All-Ireland champions Galway were shocked in the final by a double defeat to a taller and stronger New York side.

== Results ==
=== Finals ===
30 April 1967
Home Final

Galway	0-12 – 1-7	Dublin

Croke Park, Dublin
Attendance: 51,503
Referee: Eamonn Moules (Wicklow)

14 May 1967
Final, first leg

New York	3-5 – 1-6	Galway

Gaelic Park, New York City
Attendance: 12,000
Referee: Eamonn Moules (Wicklow)

21 May 1967
Final, second leg

New York	4-3 – 0-10	Galway

Gaelic Park, New York City
Attendance: 17,000
Referee: Eamonn Moules (Wicklow)

New York win 29–19 on aggregate.
