= New York county football team =

Gaelic football team

New York
- Sport: Football
- Irish: Nua Eabhrac
- Nickname(s): The Exiles
- County board: New York GAA
- Home venue(s): Gaelic Park

Recent competitive record
- Current All-Ireland status: Connacht Senior Football Championship (QF 2025)
- Last championship title: None
- Current NFL Division: DNP
- Last league title: 1967
First colours	Second colours

The New York county football team represents the New York metropolitan area in men's Gaelic football and is governed by New York GAA, the County Board of the Gaelic Athletic Association. The team competes in three of the four major annual inter-county competitions; the All-Ireland Senior Football Championship, Tailteann Cup and the Connacht Senior Football Championship; it does not currently compete in the National Football League.

New York's home ground is Gaelic Park, New York City. The team's manager is Johnny McGeeney.

New York last won the National League in 1967 and has never won the All-Ireland Senior Championship.

In the 2022 All-Ireland Junior Football Championship Semi-Final, New York beat Warwickshire on a score of 1-8 to 0-6 in Abbotstown, which marked their first win on Irish soil.

New York played in Croke Park for the first time ever in the 2022 All-Ireland Junior Football Championship Final, but lost to Kilkenny on a score of 3-11 to 1-9. But the following year, they got their revenge by beating Kilkenny in the 2023 All-Ireland Junior Football Championship final on a score of 0-13 to 1-9. This also marked New York's first trophy win in Ireland and their first trophy in 56 years.

New York won their first Connacht Senior Football Championship match in 2023, beating Leitrim on penalties after drawing the match 0-15 to 0-15 after extra time.

== History ==
In 1981, in front of a sold-out crowd of 5,000, the New York Select Carroll's All Stars defeated Galway (after a draw the previous Sunday) at Gaelic Park NY, to claim which cup? This was the match at which Brian Quinn unfurled his "Carroll You're an Animal" banner.

Gerry Fox, the former Longford footballer, was appointed manager for the 2020 season. But the team withdrew due to the impact of the COVID-19 pandemic on Gaelic games.

Under Johnny McGeeney's management, New York played against an opponent from outside Connacht in 2022, a first in championship history, Offaly the opponent and Tullamore the venue.

As of 2021, Johnny McGeeney was the team manager.

== Competitive record ==
=== League ===
New York has three league titles.

1950: New York defeated Cavan in the final.

1964: Dublin made the trip to The Bronx for the final, also billed as the "World Championship". A Brendan O'Donnell goal after half-time allowed NY to build up a seven-point lead, which a Dublin rally reduced to one point. Late in the game, players brawled on the field and were joined by a spectator, who received a black eye. New York captain Tom Hennessy scored a late point to seal victory.

1967: Three-in-a-row All-Ireland SFC winner Galway was defeated in the final.

New York participated in the FBD League until 2011.

=== Championship ===
New York took part in the 1976 Munster Minor Championship losing to Kerry. New York first competed in the Connacht Senior Football Championship in 1999.

In the 2010 championship Galway visited Gaelic Park. Despite sustaining the loss of two players to sendings off early in the second half, New York gave The Tribesmen a scare, eventually losing by a scoreline of 2–13 to 0–12. In addition, in 2010, New York took part in the Connacht Minor Football Championship (MFC) for the first time. The team sustained a heavy defeat to Galway in its first game in the competition. The following year the minor football team travelled to Ireland and suffered a heavy defeat to Roscommon in the Connacht MFC.

New York took on 2010 Connacht SFC winner Roscommon at Gaelic Park on 1 May 2011. The team lost by a scoreline of Roscommon 3–21 New York 1–11.

New York competed in the first Tailteann Cup in 2022. They also competed in the newly revamped All-Ireland Junior Football Championship in 2022, beating Warwickshire in the semi-final but losing in the final to Kilkenny in their first ever Croke Park appearance.

In the 2023 Connacht Senior Football Championship, New York recorded their first ever championship win, defeating Leitrim on penalties after the sides finished level at 0-15 apiece following extra-time. New York had remained winless in the Connacht SFC until their win against Leitrim in 2023, having lost four times each to Galway, Roscommon and Leitrim and five to Mayo and Sligo.

==== Results ====
===== Senior results =====
New York all-time senior football championship results
Year	Home team	Score	Visitors	Score	Venue	Stage	Attendance	Reference/Notes
1999	Mayo	3–13	New York	0–10	MacHale Park, Castlebar	1999 Connacht Quarter-final		New York debuts in the Connacht Senior Football Championship.
2000	Galway	1–15	New York	1–05	Tuam Stadium, Tuam	2000 Connacht Quarter-final		
2001	Roscommon	3–13	New York	1–09	Dr Hyde Park, Roscommon	2001 Connacht Quarter-final		Last Championship match New York played in Ireland until the 2022 Tailteann Cup.
2002	New York	1–11	Sligo	1–19	Gaelic Park, NY	2002 Connacht Quarter-final	1,100	First match in New York since 1947 All Ireland final and first Connacht Senior Football Championship played in the USA.
2003	New York	0–12	Leitrim	0–14 (a.e.t.)	Gaelic Park, NY	2003 Connacht Quarter-final		Match went to extra time.
2004	New York	1–08	Mayo	3–28	Gaelic Park, NY	2004 Connacht Quarter-final	5,000	New York's largest championship defeat.
2005	New York	0–06	Galway	3–14	Gaelic Park, NY	2005 Connacht Quarter-final	5,000	
2006	New York	0–09	Roscommon	1–14	Gaelic Park, NY	2006 Connacht Quarter-final		
2007	New York	1–03	Sligo	2–18	Gaelic Park, NY	2007 Connacht Quarter-final		
2008	New York	0–06	Leitrim	0–18	Gaelic Park, NY	2008 Connacht Quarter-final		
2009	New York	1–07	Mayo	1–18	Gaelic Park, NY	2009 Connacht Quarter-final		
2010	New York	0–12	Galway	2–13	Gaelic Park, NY	2010 Connacht Quarter-final		
2011	New York	1–11	Roscommon	3–21	Gaelic Park, NY	2011 Connacht Quarter-final		
2012	New York	0–06	Sligo	3–21	Gaelic Park, NY	2012 Connacht Quarter-final		
2013	New York	0–07	Leitrim	4–19	Gaelic Park, NY	2013 Connacht Quarter-final		
2014	New York	0–08	Mayo	4–18	Gaelic Park, NY	2014 Connacht Quarter-final		
2015	New York	0–08	Galway	2–18	Gaelic Park, NY	2015 Connacht Preliminary round		
2016	New York	0–17	Roscommon	1–15	Gaelic Park, NY	2016 Connacht Preliminary round	2,500	A late burst took New York to within one point of Roscommon.
2017	New York	1–13	Sligo	1–21	Gaelic Park, NY	2017 Connacht Preliminary round	5,000	
2018	New York	1–15	Leitrim	0–19 (a.e.t.)	Gaelic Park, NY	2018 Connacht Quarter-final	4,500	Match went to extra time.
2019	New York	0–04	Mayo	1–22	Gaelic Park, NY	2019 Connacht Quarter-final		
2020	Withdrew due to the impact of the COVID-19 pandemic on Gaelic games. Match against Galway was cancelled until 2025.							
2021	Withdrew due to the impact of the COVID-19 pandemic on Gaelic games. Match against Roscommon was cancelled before Christmas 2020.							
2022	New York	0–15	Sligo	1–16	Gaelic Park, NY	2022 Connacht Quarter-final	4,000	
2022	Offaly	3–17	New York	0–11	Bord Na Mona O'Connor Park, Tullamore	2022 Tailteann Cup Preliminary Quarter-finals		New York's first Tailteann Cup match and first match in Ireland since 2001.
2023	New York	0-15 (a.e.t.) (pen)	Leitrim	0-15	Gaelic Park, NY	2023 Connacht Quarter-final	6,500	New York's first win in the Connacht Senior Football Championship.
2023	Sligo	2-16	New York	0-6	Markievicz Park, Sligo	2023 Connacht Semi-final	5,677	New York's first Connacht semi-final.
2023	Carlow	0-15	New York	0-10	Dr. Cullen Park, Carlow	2023 Tailteann Cup Preliminary Quarter-finals		
2024	New York	2–6	Mayo	2–21	Gaelic Park, NY	2024 Connacht Quarter-final		New York's 25th anniversary match in the Connacht championship.
2024	Laois	1-13	New York	1-9	O'Moore Park, Portlaoise	2024 Tailteann Cup Preliminary Quarter-finals		
2025	New York	0-20	Galway	3-28	Gaelic Park, NY	2025 Connacht Quarter-final		After postponement in 2020 due to Covid-19 the fixture was played in 2025.
2025	Offaly	2-25	New York	1-12	Bord Na Mona O'Connor Park, Tullamore	2025 Tailteann Cup Preliminary Quarter-finals		
2026	New York	1-10	Roscommon	5-22	Gaelic Park, NY	2026 Connacht Quarter-final		Due to Covid-19 this fixture took an additional five years to occur with Roscommon winning a one-sided affair.
2026	Fermanagh	3-27	New York	1-13	Brewster Park	2026 Tailteann Cup Preliminary Quarter-finals		New York's first trip to Ulster.

===== Junior results =====
New York all-time junior football championship results
Year	Home team	Score	Visitors	Score	Venue	Stage	Attendance	Reference/Notes
2022	Warwickshire	0-6	New York	1-8	National Sports Campus, Abbotstown	2022 All-Ireland Junior Semi-final		
2022	Kilkenny	3-12	New York	1-9	Croke Park, Dublin	2022 All-Ireland Junior Final		
2023	New York	1-7	Warwickshire	0-7	National Sports Campus, Abbotstown	2023 All-Ireland Junior Semi-final		
2023	Kilkenny	1-09	New York	0-13	Croke Park, Dublin	2023 All Ireland Junior Football Final		New York won the All-Ireland Junior Final
2024	New York	0-11	Warwickshire	0-8	National Sports Campus, Abbottstown	2024 All Ireland Junior Football Semi-final		
2024	London	0-12	New York	0-13	Croke Park, Dublin	2024 All Ireland Junior Football Final		New York retain All-Ireland Junior title
2025	New York	2-8	United States	2-7	Gaelic Park, NY	2025 All Ireland Junior Football Quarter-final		
2025	New York	2-12	Warwickshire	1-11	National Sports Campus, Abbottstown	2025 All Ireland Junior Football Semi-final		
2025	New York	0-20	London	2-13	Croke Park, Dublin	2025 All Ireland Junior Final		New York are All-Ireland Junior Champions for third consecutive year.
2026	New York	0-13	London	0-15	National Sports Campus, Abbottstown	2026 All Ireland Junior Football Semi-final		Match required extra time

===== Minor results =====
New York all-time minor football championship results
Year	Home team	Score	Visitors	Score	Venue	Stage	Attendance	Reference/Notes
1976	Kerry	4-18	New York	1-03	Austin Stack Park, Tralee	1976 Munster Quarter-final		1 year in the championship.
1978	Mayo	8-18	New York	1-03	MacHale Park, Castlebar	1978 All Ireland Quarter-final		New York involved in All Ireland championship for 2 years.
1979	Down		New York		Pairc Esler, Newry	1979 All Ireland Quarter-final		Withdraw until 2010.
2010	Galway	5–18	New York	1–03	Pearse Stadium, Galway	2010 Connacht Quarter-final		New York's 1st Minor championship game for 34 years.
2011	Roscommon	4–20	New York	0–03	Croke Park, Dublin	2011 Connacht Quarter-final		Final championship season to date.

== Honours ==
- Connacht Senior Football Championship
  - (bronze) Semi-finalists (1): 2023
- Tailteann Cup
  - Quarter-finalists (1): 2022
- National Football League Division 1
  - (gold) Winners (3): 1949–50, 1963–64, 1966–67
- All-Ireland Junior Football Championship
  - (gold) Winners (3): 2023, 2024, 2025
  - (silver) Runners-up (1): 2022
