= Vice-provincial =

Vice-provincial or a vice-provincial may refer to

- A vice-provincial superior, an assistant to a Jesuit provincial superior
- A vice-provincial city in the People's Republic of China

== See also ==
- Provincial (disambiguation)
