= Provincial minister =

Provincial minister may refer to:

- A member of the Executive Council for one of the provinces of Canada
- A minister in one of the provincial governments of Pakistan
- Provincial minister (Sri Lanka)
- Provincial minister (Zambia)

== See also ==
- Provincial superior, a major superior of a religious order
