= French ship Provence =

A number of ships of the French Navy have borne the name Provence in honour of the province. Among them:

- Provence (1763), a 64-gun ship of the line
- Provence (1815), an 80-gun ship of the line, launched as Hercule was renamed Provence during the Bourbon Restoration
- Provence (1855), a steamer brig
- Provence (1863), a Flandre-class armoured frigate
- Provence (1912), a Bretagne-class battleship
- Rubis (S601), the lead ship of the Rubis class of attack nuclear submarines, was initially named Provence
- Provence (2013), the third French Aquitaine-class FREMM multipurpose frigate (Provence)

== See also ==
- SS La Provence, an ocean liner sunk in World War I while transporting troops

== Sources ==
- Roche, Jean-Michel (2005). Dictionnaire des bâtiments de la flotte de guerre française de Colbert à nos jours, 1671 - 1870. Group Retozel-Maury Millau. ISBN 978-2-9525917-0-6. OCLC 165892922.
