= 2023 Ulster Senior Football Championship =

Gaelic football tournament

2023 Ulster SFC
Tournament details
- Province: Ulster
- Year: 2023
- Trophy: Anglo-Celt Cup
- Date: 8 April – 14 May 2023
- Defending champions: Derry

Winners
- Champions: Derry (9th win)
- Manager: Ciaran Meenagh
- Captain: Conor Glass

Runners-up
- Runners-up: Armagh
- Manager: Kieran McGeeney
- Captain: Rian O'Neill; Aidan Nugent

Other
- Matches played: 8
- Top Scorer: Shane McGuigan (2–21)
- Website: Ulster GAA

The 2023 Ulster Senior Football Championship was the 135th installment of the annual Ulster Senior Football Championship organised by Ulster GAA. It was one of the four provincial competitions of the 2023 All-Ireland Senior Football Championship. The winning team received the Anglo-Celt Cup. The draw for the championship was made on 15 October 2022. The defending champion was Derry.

Derry successfully defended their title, beating Armagh in the final in a penalty shoot-out.

== Teams ==
=== General information ===
Nine counties competed in the Ulster Senior Football Championship:

County	Last Championship Title	Last All-Ireland Title	Position in 2022 Championship
Antrim	1951	—	Quarter-finals
Armagh	2008	2002	Quarter-finals
Cavan	2020	1952	Semi-finals
Derry	2022	1993	Champions
Donegal	2019	2012	Runners-up
Down	1994	1994	Quarter-finals
Fermanagh	—	—	Preliminary round
Monaghan	2015	—	Semi-finals
Tyrone	2021	2021	Quarter-finals

=== Personnel and kits ===
County	Manager	Captain(s)	Sponsors
Antrim	Andy McEntee	Peter Healy	Fibrus
Armagh	Kieran McGeeney	Aidan Nugent, Rian O'Neill	Simply Fruit
Cavan	Mickey Graham	Raymond Galligan	Kingspan Group
Derry	Rory Gallagher	Conor Glass	Errigal Contracts
Donegal	Aidan O'Rourke	Paddy McBrearty	Circet
Down	Conor Laverty	Pierce Laverty	EOS IT Solutions
Fermanagh	Kieran Donnelly	Declan McCusker	Tracey Concrete
Monaghan	Vinny Corey	Kieran Duffy	All Boro Floor Services
Tyrone	Feargal Logan and Brian Dooher	Pádraig Hampsey	McAleer & Rushe Ltd

== Draw ==
Preliminary round

Quarter-finals

Semi-finals

Final

Fermanagh
2–8

Derry
3–17

Derry
1–21

Monaghan
2–10

Tyrone
1–18

Monaghan
2–17

Derry
1–15 (3)

Armagh
0–18 (1)

Down
2–13

Donegal
1–11

Down
0–12

Armagh
4–10

Cavan
0–12

Armagh
0–20

Armagh
1–14

Antrim
1–8

== Preliminary round ==
8 April 2023
17:00 IST (UTC+1)
Preliminary round

Armagh	0–20 – 1–8	Antrim
Conor Turbitt 0–8 (0–3f, 0–1m), Shane McPartlan 0–4, Rory Grugan 0–3 (0–1f), Ethan Rafferty 0–1 (0–1f), Ciaran Mackin 0–1, Stefan Campbell 0–1, Jemar Hall 0–1, Tiernan Kelly 0–1	Report	Conor Stewart 1–1, Ruairi McCann (Creggan) 0–1 (0–1f), Ryan Murray 0–1 (0–1f), Eoghan McCabe 0–1, James McAuley 0–1, Pat Shivers 0–1, Ruairi McCann (Aghagallon) 0–1, Odhrán Eastwood 0–1

Athletic Grounds, Armagh
Attendance: 10,063
Referee: Jerome Henry

== Quarter-finals ==
15 April 2023
17:00 IST (UTC+1)
Quarter-final

Fermanagh	2–8 – 3–17	Derry
Ché Cullen 2–0, Ryan Lyons 0–2 (0–2f), Ultán Kelm 0–2, Seán McNally 0–1 (0–1 '45), Ryan Jones 0–1, Aidan Breen 0–1, Declan McCusker 0–1	Report	Shane McGuigan 2–5 (1–0 pen, 0–1f), Paul Cassidy 1–2, Padraig Cassidy 0–2, Odhran Lynch 0–1, Padraig McGrogan 0–1, Conor McCluskey 0–1, Conor Glass 0–1, Brendan Rogers 0–1, Niall Toner 0–1, Ethan Doherty 0–1, Eoin McEvoy 0–1

Brewster Park, Enniskillen
Attendance: 6,928
Referee: Joe McQuillan
16 April 2023
16:00 IST (UTC+1)
Quarter-final

Tyrone	1–18 – 2–17	Monaghan
Darragh Canavan 1–5 (0–1f), Darren McCurry 0–5 (0–3f), Mattie Donnelly 0–3, Conor Meyler 0–2, Niall Morgan 0–1 (0–1 '45), Niall Sludden 0–1, Conn Kilpatrick 0–1	Report	Conor McManus 0–9 (0–8f), Ryan O'Toole 1–1, Stephen O'Hanlon 1–0, Jack McCarron 0–2 (0–2f), Conor McCarthy 0–2, Micheál Bannigan 0–1, Kieran Duffy 0–1, Shane Carey 0–1

Healy Park, Omagh
Attendance: 10,067
Referee: Niall Cullen
22 April 2023
18:30 IST (UTC+1)
Quarter-final

Cavan	0–12 – 1–14	Armagh
Paddy Lynch 0–4 (0–1f, 0–1m), Gearóid McKiernan 0–3 (0–1f), Cian Madden 0–2, Raymond Galligan 0–1 (0–1 '45), Oisin Brady 0–1, Conor Brady 0–1	Report	Conor Turbitt 0–7 (0–3f), Ben Crealey 1–0, Ethan Rafferty 0–1 (0–1 '45), Rory Grugan 0–1 (0–1f), Conor O'Neill 0–1, Greg McCabe 0–1, Shane McPartlan 0–1, Jemar Hall 0–1, Andrew Murnin 0–1

Breffni Park, Cavan
Attendance: 11,527
Referee: Paul Faloon
23 April 2023
14:00 IST (UTC+1)
Quarter-final

Down	2–13 – 1–11	Donegal
Pat Havern 1–3 (1–0 pen, 0–3f), Ryan Johnston 0–3 (0–2m), Liam Kerr 1–0, Andrew Gilmore 0–2 (0–1f), Daniel Guinness 0–2, Danny Magill 0–1, Eugene Branagan 0–1, Conor Poland 0–1	Report	Jason McGee 1–1, Daire Ó Baoill 0–3, Ciarán Thompson 0–2 (0–2f), Conor O'Donnell 0–2, Shaun Patton 0–1 (0–1 '45), Caolan Ward 0–1, Oisín Gallen 0–1

Páirc Esler, Newry
Attendance: 9,139
Referee: Brendan Cawley

== Semi-finals ==
29 April 2023
17:00 IST (UTC+1)
Semi-final

Derry	1–21 – 2–10	Monaghan
Shane McGuigan 0–9 (0–5f), Conor McCluskey 1–0, Padraig McGrogan 0–2, Conor Glass 0–2, Paul Cassidy 0–2, Ethan Doherty 0–2, Niall Toner 0–1 (0–1f), Odhran Lynch 0–1, Conor Doherty 0–1, Brendan Rogers 0–1	Report	Karl O'Connell 1–1, Conor McManus 0–3 (0–3f), Karl Gallagher 1–0, Rory Beggan 0–2 (0–2f), Conor Boyle 0–1, Stephen O'Hanlon 0–1, Micheál Bannigan 0–1, Kieran Hughes 0–1

Healy Park, Omagh
Attendance: 13,371
Referee: Sean Hurson
30 April 2023
16:00 IST (UTC+1)
Semi-final

Armagh	4–10 – 0–12	Down
Andrew Murnin 1–1, Shane McPartlan 1–0, Ciaran Mackin 1–0, Rían O'Neill 1–0, Jason Duffy 0–2, Rory Grugan 0–1 (0–1f), Callum Cumiskey 0–1, Conor O'Neill 0–1, Aidan Forker 0–1, Aidan Nugent 0–1, Jemar Hall 0–1, Stefan Campbell 0–1	Report	Pat Havern 0–6 (0–5f), Ryan McEvoy 0–2 (0–2f), Andrew Gilmore 0–1, Ryan Johnston 0–1, Liam Kerr 0–1, Patrick Branagan 0–1

St Tiernach's Park, Clones
Attendance: 22,520
Referee: Conor Lane

== Final ==
14 May 2023
16:00 IST (UTC+1)
Final

Derry	1–15 – 0–18 (a.e.t.)	Armagh
Shane McGuigan 0–7 (0–2f), Brendan Rogers 1–2, Niall Toner 0–2 (0–2f), Gareth McKinless 0–1, Conor Glass 0–1, Niall Loughlin 0–1, Lachlan Murray 0–1	Report	Rían O'Neill 0–6 (0–3f, 0–1 '45), Rory Grugan 0–2 (0–2f), Jarlath Óg Burns 0–2 (0–1m), Ethan Rafferty 0–2, Stefan Campbell 0–2, Greg McCabe 0–1 (0–1m), Conor O'Neill 0–1, Ciaran Mackin 0–1, Ross McQuillan 0–1
Penalties
Shane McGuigan; Paul Cassidy; Conor Glass; Ciaran McFaul	3–1	Rían O'Neill; Callum Cumiskey; Aidan Nugent; Ethan Rafferty

St Tiernach's Park, Clones
Attendance: 29,000
Referee: David Gough

== Stadia and attendance ==
County	Location	Province	Stadium	Capacity
Antrim	Belfast	Ulster	Corrigan Park	3,700
Armagh	Armagh	Ulster	Athletic Grounds	18,500
Cavan	Cavan	Ulster	Breffni Park	25,030
Derry	Derry	Ulster	Celtic Park	18,500
Donegal	Ballybofey	Ulster	MacCumhaill Park	17,500
Down	Newry	Ulster	Páirc Esler	20,000
Fermanagh	Enniskillen	Ulster	Brewster Park	20,000
Monaghan	Clones	Ulster	St Tiernach's Park	29,000
Tyrone	Omagh	Ulster	Healy Park	17,636

Total attendance	112,615
Average attendance	14,077
Highest attendance	29,000; Derry 1–15 – 0–18 Armagh; 14 May 2023

== Statistics ==
=== Scoring events ===
- Widest winning margin: 12 points
  - Fermanagh 2-08 - 3-17 Derry (Quarter-finals)
- Most goals in a match: 5
  - Fermanagh 2-08 - 3-17 Derry (Quarter-finals)
- Most points in a match: 35
  - Tyrone 1-18 - 2-17 Monaghan (Quarter-finals)
- Most goals by one team in a match: 3
  - Fermanagh 2-08 - 3-17 Derry (Quarter-finals)
- Most points by one team in a match: 21
  - Derry 1-21 - 2-10 Monaghan (Semi-finals)
- Highest aggregate score: 44 points
  - Tyrone 1-18 - 2-17 Monaghan (Quarter-finals)
- Lowest aggregate score: 29 points
  - Cavan 0-12 - 1-14 Armagh (Quarter-finals)

== Miscellaneous ==
Paddy Carr went unbeaten as Donegal manager during this campaign

== See also ==
- 2023 All-Ireland Senior Football Championship
- 2023 Connacht Senior Football Championship
- 2023 Leinster Senior Football Championship
- 2023 Munster Senior Football Championship
- 2023 Tailteann Cup (Tier 2)
- 2023 All-Ireland Junior Football Championship (Tier 3)
