= Province (disambiguation) =

A province is a form of subnational governmental entity.

Province also may refer to any of the following subdivisions:

== Jurisdictions ==
- Roman province, or provincia, administrative unit in the Roman empire
- Ecclesiastical province, large jurisdiction of religious government
- Regular province, jurisdiction within a religious order or congregation
- Province (Gaelic games), a body consisting of several counties
- Prowincja, a division of the Polish-Lithuanian Commonwealth

== Spatial constructs delimited by geophysical or ecological criteria ==
- Botanical Provinces of Western Australia
- Geologic province, defined region
- Physiographic province, geographic region based on geomorphology

== Media ==
- "Province" (song), on 2006 album Return to Cookie Mountain by group TV on the Radio
- The Province (film), 1991 Dutch work
- The Vancouver Province (or The Province), newspaper of the western-Canada city

== See also ==
- Ecoregion
- Federated state
- Provence (disambiguation)
- Provincial (disambiguation)
