= Auberge la Provence =

- Interactive map of Auberge la Provence

Restaurant information
- Rating: Michelin Guide
- Location: Westerheide 2, Laren, Netherlands
- Coordinates: 52°14′49″N 5°12′26″E

Auberge Postillion de la Provence (popular: La Provence or Auberge La Provence) was a fine dining restaurant in Laren, in the Netherlands. It was awarded one Michelin star in 1974, and retained it until 1989.

Head chef in the Michelin period was Han de Wijs.

The restaurant was founded in the 1960s by Martin Fagel. In 1969, he sold the restaurant to Han de Wijs. In 1989, De Wijs sold the restaurant to . In December 1989 the restaurant caught fire, affecting the administration and the thatched roof. Owner Stage Door B.V. became bankrupt in 1995. In July 1995, shortly after the bankruptcy, the restaurant burnt down.

In 2012 a La Place restaurant stood on the site.

== See also ==
- List of Michelin starred restaurants in the Netherlands
