= Provincial city =

Provincial city may refer to:

- Provincial city (Taiwan)
- Provincial city (Vietnam)
- Prefecture-level city in China
