= Member of Provincial Parliament =

Member of Provincial Parliament is the title given to provincial legislators in two legislatures:

- Member of Provincial Parliament (Canada)
- Member of Provincial Parliament (Western Cape)
