= Gaelic games in North America =

North America GAA
- Location: North America
- Major grounds: Gaelic Park; Shamrock Field

Most All-Ireland titles
- Hurling: None
- Football: None

Most provincial titles
- Hurling: No Championship
- Football: No Championship

Interprovincial Championship wins
- Hurling: N/A
- Football: N/A

Standard kit
- Regular kit

Gaelic games in North America or North America GAA is an unofficial provincial council for the Gaelic Athletic Association and Gaelic games in North America. The board is also responsible for the Gaelic Athletic Association sports of hurling, Gaelic football, camogie, rounders and handball in North America. They do not have a high profile in North America, but are developing sports.

The Gaelic games in North America are governed by three Gaelic Athletic Association (GAA) County boards: In Canada, Gaelic games are governed by Gaelic Games Canada, while in the USA they are governed by the United States GAA and the New York GAA. Many tournaments include cultural events.

== County boards ==
- Canada
- New York
- United States

== All-Ireland Football Championship ==
=== New York ===
New York, along with London, has fielded a representative team in the Connacht Senior Football Championship since 1999. They have fielded a team in the Tailteann Cup since 2022. New York’s second team has competed in the All-Ireland Junior Football Championship since 2022. New York plays its home games at the 2,000 seat Gaelic Park, a stadium in Riverdale in the Bronx, New York owned by Manhattan College. New York won their first ever connacht match in 2023, defeating Leitrim.

=== Canada ===
Canada has never competed in the All-Ireland Senior Football Championship.

=== United States ===
The United States has never competed in the All-Ireland Senior Football Championship.

== History ==
The New York Board is the oldest county board of the GAA in North America; however, Gaelic games were played in many parts of the continent before the foundation of the GAA, and the organisation of county boards. Hurling was recorded as being played in the Colony of Newfoundland in 1788. The New York GAA has a long history in Gaelic games starting at a time of the mass immigration to New York from Ireland. The first organized hurling and football club in New York was founded in 1857.

The Toronto Divisional board of the GAA was formed in 1947.

== See also ==
- Gaelic Athletic Association
