= 1944 All-Ireland Senior Football Championship =

Football championship

All-Ireland Champions
- Winning team: Roscommon (2nd win)
- Captain: Jimmy Murray

All-Ireland Finalists
- Losing team: Kerry
- Captain: Paddy Bawn Brosnan

Provincial Champions
- Munster: Kerry
- Leinster: Carlow
- Ulster: Cavan
- Connacht: Roscommon

Championship statistics

The 1944 All-Ireland Senior Football Championship was the 58th staging of Ireland's premier Gaelic football knock-out competition.

Roscommon won their second title in a row and, so far, their last. Kilkenny's final year in the Leinster championship until 1961.

== Results ==
=== Connacht Senior Football Championship ===
25 June 1944
Quarter-Final

Leitrim	4–5 – 4–10	Sligo

Boyle

18 June 1944
Semi-Final

Galway	1–3 – 1–11	Mayo
		H Kenny (0–2), T Langan (0–2), J Munnelly (Castlebar, 0–2), J Gilvarry (1–1), T Hoban (0–4).

McHale Park, Castlebar

2 July 1944
Semi-Final

Roscommon	1–5 – 0–8	Sligo

Boyle

9 July 1944
Semi-Final Replay

Roscommon	0–13 – 1–6	Sligo

Boyle
Attendance: 10,000

6 August 1944
Final

Roscommon	2–11 – 1–6	Mayo
		T Langan (0–1), T Hoban (1–5, one point a free).

Tuam

=== Leinster Senior Football Championship ===
14 May 1944
Preliminary Round

Wexford	4–12 – 0–2	Kilkenny

Barrett's Park, New Ross

14 May 1944
Preliminary Round

Carlow	1–10 – 2–7	Kildare
		J.Martin 1–4, F.Dowling, R.Martin, P.Heavey 0–1.

Geraldine Park, Athy

21 May 1944
Preliminary Round

Offaly	3–9 – 2–8	Westmeath

O'Connor Park, Tullamore
Referee: J Dowling (Kildare)

28 May 1944
Preliminary Round Replay

Carlow	3–11 – 2–5	Kildare
		D.Fox 1–1, F.Dowling 0–3, J.Martin 0–1.

Dr. Cullen Park, Carlow

28 May 1944
Preliminary Round

Dublin	1–8 – 1–6	Meath

Drogheda Park, Drogheda

4 June 1944
Quarter-Final

Longford	4–3 – 1–4	Offaly

Pearse Park, Longford
Referee: J Geraghty

11 June 1944
Quarter-Final

Wexford	2–7 – 1–4	Wicklow

Aughrim Park, Aughrim

18 June 1944
Quarter-Final

Carlow	2–8 – 2–3	Laois

Geraldine Park, Athy

18 June 1944
Quarter-Final

Dublin	2–10 – 3–6	Louth
JJ Maher 0–5 (0-4f), B Maguire 1–1, Paddy O'Connor 1–0, Mick Culhane 0–2, Mick Falvey and Paddy Bermingham 0–1 each		Peter Corr 1–3 (1–0 pen, 0-3f), Kevin Connolly and Paddy Kelly 1–0 each, Oliver Halpin 0–2, Mick Hardy 0-1f

Croke Park, Dublin

9 July 1944
Semi-Final

Dublin	2–2 – 1–4	Longford
Mick Falvey 1–1 (0-1f), Paddy O'Connor 1–0, Mick Culhane 0–1		R Fagan o.g. 1–0, J O'Brien 0–2, F Doris and Jimmy Hannify Sr 0–1 each

Cusack Park, Mullingar

16 July 1944
Semi-Final

Carlow	5–7 – 3–6	Wexford

Nowlan Park, Kilkenny

30 July 1944
Final

Carlow	2–6 – 1–6	Dublin
Johnny Doyle 1–4 (0-4f) and Jimma Rea 1–2	Report	J Counihan 1–0, JJ Maher and B Maguire 0–2 each, Mick Culhane (0-1f) and Paddy Bermingham 0–1 each

Geraldine Park, Athy
Attendance: 15,000
Referee: J. Dowling (Kildare)

=== Munster Senior Football Championship ===
14 May 1944
Quarter-Final

Kerry	4–8 – 1–4	Clare
Jackie Lyne (0–2), Johnny Clifford (1–0) & Phil McCarthy (1–0).

Austin Stack Park, Tralee

14 May 1944
Quarter-Final

Tipperary	1–10 – 0–5	Waterford

Walsh Park, Waterford
Referee: P. J. O'Sullivan ( T )

18 June 1944
Semi-Final

Kerry	3–9 – 1–4	Limerick
Joe Fitzgerald (0–2), Willie O'Donnell (0–3), Gus Cremin (1–2), Paddy O'Donoghue(2–1) & Paddy Bawn Brosnan (0–1).

Frank Sheehy Park, Listowel

18 June 1944
Semi-Final

Tipperary	1–9 – 1–3	Cork
		F. Gowen (0–1), J. Cronin (0–1) & J. Aherne (1–1).

Ned Hall Park, Clonmel
Attendance: 5,000
Referee: P. McKenna (Limerick)

9 July 1944
Final

Kerry	1–6 – 0–5	Tipperary
Paddy Kennedy (1–0), Sean Brosnan (0–2), Murt Kelly (0–3) & Eddie Dunne (0–1).

Gaelic Grounds, Limerick
Referee: P. McKenna (Limerick)

=== Ulster Senior Football Championship ===
2 July 1944
Quarter-Final

Monaghan	3–7 – 3–3	Armagh

Athletic Grounds, Armagh

2 July 1944
Quarter-Final

Down	3–4 – 0–4	Tyrone

Corrigan Park, Belfast

2 July 1944
Quarter-Final

Cavan	1–4 – 0–2	Antrim
T Tighe (0–1), M Cully (1–0), J Boylan (0–1), L Murphy (0–1), JJ O Reilly (0–1)		K Armstrong (0–1), J Morgan (0–1)

Corrigan Park, Belfast
Referee: Mr J Murtagh (Down)

9 July 1944
Semi-Final

Monaghan	1–5 – 1–4	Down

Corrigan Park, Belfast

16 July 1944
Semi-Final

Cavan	5–9 – 2–3	Donegal
T O Reilly (1–1), T Tighe (1–0), Cully(0–4), P Donohoe (1–1), Murphy (2–1), Boylan (0–2)		J Gallagher (0–1), Goane (0–1), M Slevin (1–0), J Forde (1–0), H Gallagher (0–1)

Omagh
Referee: Mr J Murtagh (Down)

30 July 1944
Final

Cavan	1–9 – 1–6	Monaghan
G Smith (0–2), M Cully (0–1) M Higgins (0–2), T Tighe (0–1), L Murphy (1–2),		P Mc Carney (0–4), C Mc Grath (1–0), P Mc Carville (0–1), C Brennan (0–1)

St. Tiernach's Park, Clones
Attendance: 13,000
Referee: Mr J Murtagh (Down)

=== All-Ireland Senior Football Championship ===
20 August 1944
Semi-Final

Roscommon	5–8 – 1–3	Cavan
D Keenan (0–4), F Kinlough (1–2), H Gibbons (2–0), J Nerney (1–1), J Mc Quillan (1–0)		T O Reilly (1–1), M Higgins (0–2)

Croke Park, Dublin
Attendance: 33,290
Referee: Sgt P Mc Kenna (Limerick)

27 August 1944
Semi-Final

Kerry	3–3 – 0–10	Carlow
Johnny Clifford (0–1), Bill Dillon (1–0), Willie O'Donnell(0–1), Paddy Bawn Brosnan (1–0) & Murt Kelly (1–1).

Croke Park, Dublin
Attendance: 40,727

24 September 1944
Final

Roscommon	1–9 – 2–4	Kerry
D. Keenan (0–6), F. Kinlough (1–1), J. Murray & L. Gilmatin (0–1).		Bill Dillon (0–1), Paddy Kennedy (0–2), Murt Kelly (1–1) & Eddie Dunne (1–0).

Croke Park, Dublin
Attendance: 79,245
Referee: Paddy Mythen (Wexford)

== Championship statistics ==
=== Miscellaneous ===
- The Kilkenny vs Wexford game was Kilkenny's last championship game until 1961 final game to be played at New Ross until 1997.
- The Clones pitch becomes St Tiernach's Park.
- Tralee's pitch becomes known as Austin Stack Park which is named after Austin Stack.
- Carlow win their first ever Leinster title.
- The All Ireland semi final meeting of Kerry and Carlow was their first championship meeting.
- Roscommon are All Ireland Champions for 2 in a row.
