= 2022 All-Ireland Junior Football Championship =

- Dates: 8 July - 10 July 2022
- Teams: 4
- Champions: Kilkenny (1st title); Mick Malone (captain); Christy Walsh (manager)
- Runners-up: New York

Tournament statistics
- Matches played: 3
- Goals scored: 10 (3.33 per match)
- Points scored: 55 (18.33 per match)
- Top scorer(s): Mick Kenny(2-08)

The 2022 All-Ireland Junior Football Championship is the 90th staging of the All-Ireland Junior Football Championship since its establishment by the Gaelic Athletic Association in 1912. The championship is scheduled to run between 8 July 2022 and 10 July 2022.

Kerry were the defending champions, however, they did not field a team because of a change in championship format.

The All-Ireland final was played on 10 July 2022 at Croke Park in Dublin, between Kilkenny and New York, in what was their first ever meeting in the final. Kilkenny won the match by 3-12 to 1-09 to claim their first ever championship title.

Kilkenny's Mick Kenny was the championship's top scorer with 2-08.

== Format ==
After a two-year hiatus due to the COVID-19 pandemic, the All-Ireland Junior Championship returned with a new format confined to just four teams; New York, Kilkenny and the winner and runner-up of the British Junior Football Championship. Prior to the change, the championship previously featured a provincial structure for all junior Gaelic football inter-county teams in Ireland.

== Teams ==
Team	Province	Championship Titles	Last Championship Title	Method of Qualification
Kilkenny	Leinster	1	2022	Automatic
London	Britain	6	1986	All-Britain Junior Football Champions
New York	North America	0	-	Automatic
Warwickshire	Britain	0	-	All-Britain Junior Football Runners-Up

== Results ==
=== Bracket ===
Semi-Finals
Kilkenny	3-11
London	2-09
New York	1-08
Warwickshire	0-06

Final
Kilkenny	3-12
New York	1-09

=== All-Ireland semi-finals ===
8 July 2022 Semi-final	Kilkenny	3-11 - 2-09	London	Abbottstown COE
	M Malone 2-3, M Kenny 1-4 (0-2f), J Holohan 0-1, R Monks 0-1, C Hennessy 0-1, S Stapleton 0-1.	Report	S Rafter 2-3 (0-2f), C Spinks 0-5 (0-3f), T Waters 0-1.	Referee: K Faloon (Armagh)

8 July 2022 Semi-final	New York	1-08 - 0-06	Warwickshire	Abbottstown COE
	S McElligot 1-3 (0-1f), T Mathers 0-1, B Coughlan 0-1, P Cronin 0-1, B Cole 0-1 (45), K Loane 0-1.	Report	M McGettrick 0-3 (0-1f), N Gilbride 0-1, C Dowling 0-1 (0-1m), J Connolly 0-1 (0-1f).	Referee: C Dourneen (Cavan)

=== All-Ireland final ===
10 July 2022 Final	Kilkenny	3-12 - 1-09	New York	Croke Park
	M Kenny 1-4 (4f), J Holohan 1-2, J Walsh 1-0, J Culleton 0-2, C Hennessy, K Blanchfield, S Kelly, E Phelan 0-1 each.	Report	B Coughlan 1-1 (0-1f), S McElligot 0-4 (4f), M Brosnan, Conor Mathers 0-2 each.	Referee: B Tiernan (Dublin)

== Championship statistics ==
=== Top scorers ===
Overall

Rank	Player	Club	Tally	Total	Matches	Average
1	Mick Kenny	Kilkenny	2-08	14	2	7.00
2	Shay McElligott	New York	1-07	10	2	5.00
3	Shay Rafter	London	2-03	9	1	9.00
3	Mick Malone	Kilkenny	2-03	9	2	4.50

In a single game

Rank	Player	Club	Tally	Total	Opposition
1	Mick Malone	Kilkenny	2-03	9	London
1	Shay Rafter	London	2-03	9	Kilkenny
3	Mick Kenny	Kilkenny	1-04	7	London
3	Mick Kenny	Kilkenny	1-04	7	New York
5	Shay McElligott	New York	1-03	6	Warwickshire
6	Jamie Holohan	Kilkenny	1-02	5	New York
6	Conor Spinks	London	0-05	5	Kilkenny
