= Province (Gaelic games) =

Organizational body within the Gaelic Athletic Association

A province is a geographic region within Gaelic games, consisting of several counties of the Gaelic Athletic Association (GAA) and originally based on the historic four provinces of Ireland as they were set in 1610.

== Provincial councils ==
A provincial council is responsible for the organisation of club and inter-county competitions such as the provincial championships, and the promotion of Gaelic games within its region. This region consists of several county boards. Listed below are the five existing provincial councils (four of which are on the island of Ireland). The British GAA is the fifth provincial council. To the right is a map showing the location of the provinces of Ireland, i.e. north, south, east, west. Another map below it indicates Britain in relation to Ireland.

Provinces of Ireland

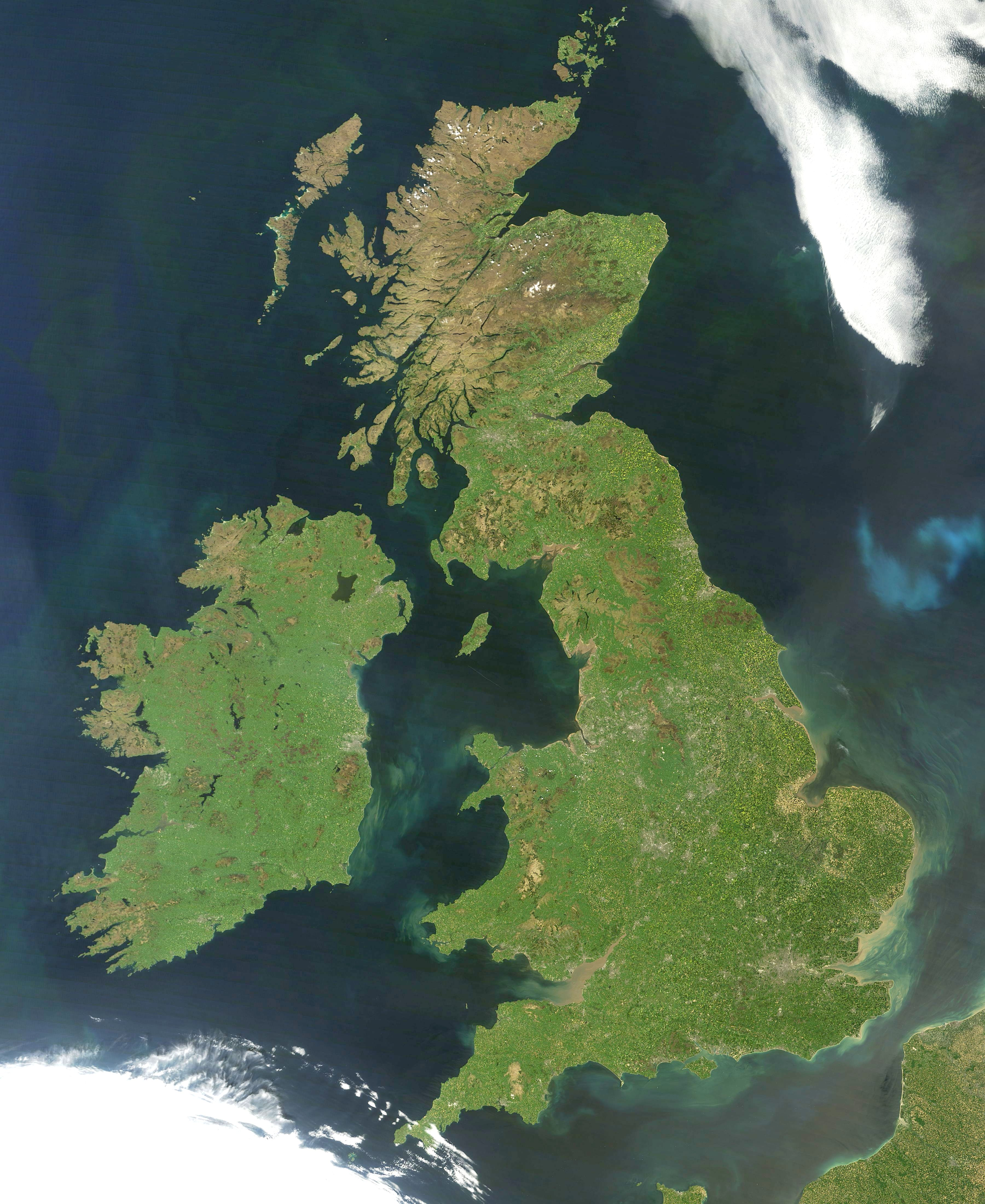
Britain is to the east of Ireland

- Connacht
- Leinster
- Munster
- Ulster
- Britain

The ultimate goal of Gaelic Games Europe (the European county board) is to become a provincial council.

Gaelic games in North America acts as a provincial council for clubs and the three county teams in North America.

== Provincial championships ==
=== Championships ===
==== Football ====
- Connacht Senior Football Championship
- Leinster Senior Football Championship
- Munster Senior Football Championship
- Ulster Senior Football Championship

==== Hurling ====
- Connacht Senior Hurling Championship
- Leinster Senior Hurling Championship
- Munster Senior Hurling Championship
- Ulster Senior Hurling Championship

A provincial championship is a competition in which counties compete against rival counties from the same province. All 4 Provinces of Ireland organise a provincial championship in both codes. However, there is variation. For instance, Antrim and Galway have competed in the Leinster Senior Hurling Championship despite not being from Leinster. This is due to the strength of their teams with respect to other counties in their province. Teams representing London GAA, though based in Britain, have competed in the Connacht Senior Football Championship and Ulster Senior Hurling Championship (e.g. in 2010).

List of all provincial changes (years in province)

- Antrim Hurling (Leinster 2009-)
- Galway Hurling (Leinster 2009-)
- London Hurling (Leinster 2014-2015)
- Kerry Hurling (Leinster 2016-2017)
- Galway Hurling (Munster 1959-1969)
- London Hurling (Ulster 1998-2010)
- New York Hurling (Ulster 2000-2006)
- London Football (Connacht 1975-)
- New York Football (Connacht 1999-)

Setanta Sports broadcasts live provincial championships matches in Australia. Setanta Sports also provides matches from the provincial championships in Asia.

=== Roll of honour ===
Football

#	County	Titles	Runners-up	Most Recent Win	Most Recent Final
1	Kerry	86	24	2025	2025
2	Dublin	63	23	2024	2024
3	Galway	51	34	2025	2025
4	Mayo	48	36	2021	2025
5	Cavan	40	23	2020	2020
6	Cork	37	54	2012	2021
7	Roscommon	24	25	2019	2022
8	Meath	21	23	2010	2025
9	Monaghan	16	12	2015	2021
9	Tyrone	16	7	2021	2021
11	Armagh	14	23	2008	2025
12	Kildare	13	23	2000	2022
13	Down	12	15	1994	2017
13	Donegal	12	14	2025	2025
15	Tipperary	10	18	2020	2020
15	Wexford	10	16	1945	2011
15	Antrim	10	9	1951	2009
15	Offaly	10	9	1997	2006
19	Louth	9	16	2025	2025
19	Derry	9	10	2023	2023
21	Laois	6	15	2003	2018
22	Sligo	3	16	2007	2023
22	Kilkenny	3	5	1911	1922
24	Clare	2	15	1992	2025
24	Leitrim	2	9	1994	2000
26	Limerick	1	13	1896	2022
26	Waterford	1	9	1898	1960
26	Westmeath	1	4	2004	2016
26	Carlow	1	2	1944	1944
26	Longford	1	1	1968	1968
31	Fermanagh	0	6	—	2018
31	Wicklow	0	1	—	1897
31	London	0	1	—	2013

=== Provincial Hurling Champions ===
Year	Connacht	Leinster	Munster	Ulster
2024	—	Kilkenny	Limerick	—
2023	—	Kilkenny	Limerick	—
2022	—	Kilkenny	Limerick	—
2021	—	Kilkenny	Limerick	—
2020	—	Kilkenny	Limerick	—
2019	—	Wexford	Limerick	—
2018	—	Galway	Cork	—
2017	—	Galway	Cork	Antrim
2016	—	Kilkenny	Tipperary	Antrim
2015	—	Kilkenny	Tipperary	Antrim
2014	—	Kilkenny	Cork	Antrim
2013	—	Dublin	Limerick	Antrim

=== Provincial Football Champions ===
Year	Connacht	Leinster	Munster	Ulster
2025	Galway	Louth	Kerry	Donegal
2024	Galway	Dublin	Kerry	Donegal
2023	Galway	Dublin	Kerry	Derry
2022	Galway	Dublin	Kerry	Derry
2021	Mayo	Dublin	Kerry	Tyrone
2020	Mayo	Dublin	Tipperary	Cavan
2019	Roscommon	Dublin	Kerry	Donegal
2018	Galway	Dublin	Kerry	Donegal
2017	Roscommon	Dublin	Kerry	Tyrone
2016	Galway	Dublin	Kerry	Tyrone
2015	Mayo	Dublin	Kerry	Monaghan
2014	Mayo	Dublin	Kerry	Donegal
2013	Mayo	Dublin	Kerry	Monaghan
