= Gaelic Park =

Stadium in the Bronx, New York

- Páirc na nGael
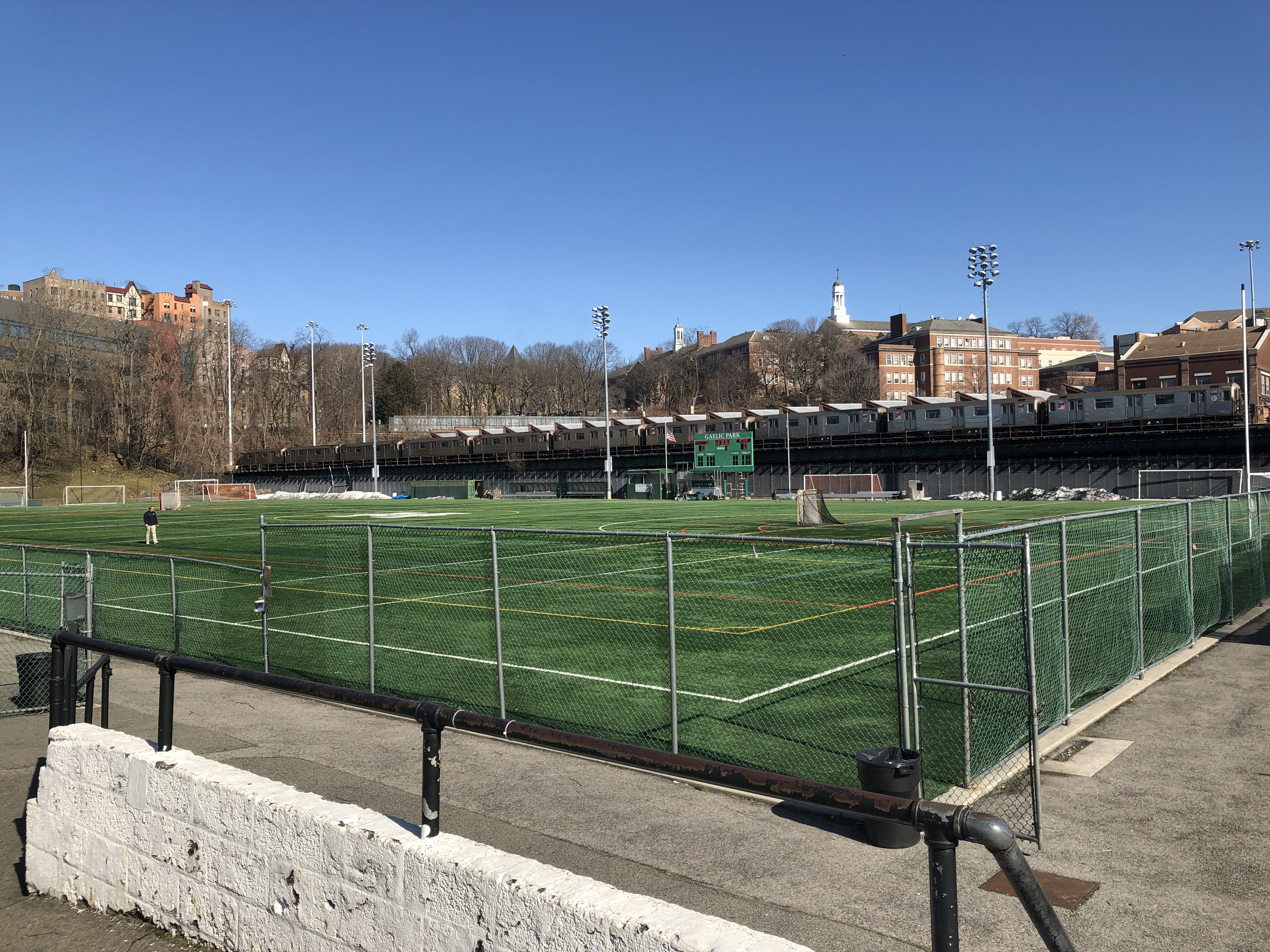

- Location within New York City
- Former names: Innisfail Park
- Location: Kingsbridge, Bronx, New York City, New York, United States
- Coordinates: 40°53′15″N 73°54′5″W
- Owner: Manhattan University
- Operator: New York GAA
- Capacity: 2,000
- Surface: FieldTurf
- Scoreboard: Yes
- Public transit: New York City Subway: train at 238th Street station

Construction
- Built: 1926
- Renovated: 2007
- Cost: $3 million
- Project manager: Michael Antonaccio

Tenants
- New York GAA (1926–present); Manhattan SC (USL2) (2019–present); Manhattan Jaspers (soccer, men's lacrosse, softball)

Gaelic Park (Irish: Páirc na nGael) is a multi-purpose outdoor athletics facility, located at West 240th Street and Broadway in the Kingsbridge neighborhood of the Bronx in New York City, New York, United States. Since 1926 the grounds has been used as the venue for Gaelic games in New York, and since its purchase by Manhattan University in 1991 it has hosted numerous American college athletic events.

The park is located just west of Broadway and south and west of Van Cortlandt Park in the northernmost part of the Bronx just south of the city border with Westchester County. Gaelic Park was purchased in 1926 by the Gaelic Athletic Association of Greater New York. It has been given a few names over time including Innisfail Park, but since the 1950s it has gone by its current name, Gaelic Park, a reflection of the park's decidedly Irish flavor. The park includes a playing field and dance hall. In addition to hurling and football matches, a number of other sporting events take place at Gaelic Park. There are also concerts and dances that feature Irish music both old and new.

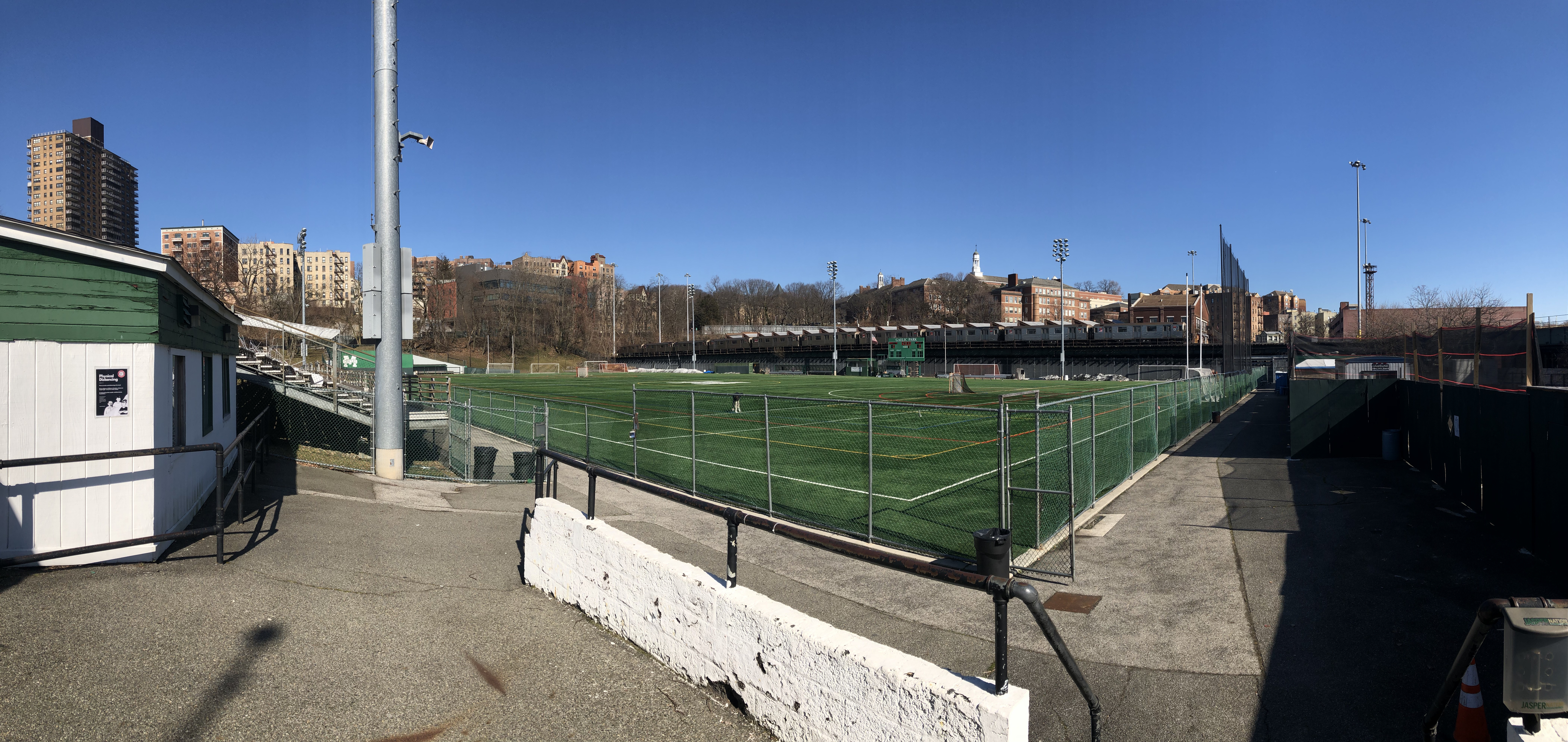
Gaelic Park, The Bronx

== History ==
Gaelic Park was bought by the Gaelic Athletic Association of Greater New York (GAA) in 1926. It started off as a very rough pitch that served as a social center for the many Irish immigrants to The Bronx. With the absence of film centers and other entertainment complexes, hurling at the park was the main entertainment.

The GAA ran the park for about 10 years until it was forced into bankruptcy, after which the city took over the land. The property was then leased again in 1941 to John "Kerry" O’Donnell, who with the help of his family and friends ran the park, dance hall, and tavern. For several years, it was called "Croke Park" after the main GAA stadium in Dublin.

In 1947, John "Lefty" Devine became the public address announcer and the play by play announcer for Gaelic Park. He did both jobs for at least 18 years until 1965. Devine was born in New York. His father was born in Newmarket-upon-Fergus, County Clare and his mother was born in Mullinahone, County Tipperary. In 1965, it took Mr. Devine about 6 hours to announce the 5 games played there each Sunday. Mr. Devine was the play-by-play announcer at the Polo Grounds in a Gaelic football match of Meath vs. New York.

In 1964, Robert F Kennedy attended a game at Gaelic Park. He addressed the crowd with a microphone. Jokingly, he said to the crowd "Every morning before breakfast my children say 'Up Wexford.'" His paternal grandparents were from New Ross, County Wexford.

As of 1965, Gaelic Park had a capacity of 12,000 people.

The Grateful Dead performed in Gaelic Park on August 26, 1971, to a crowd of 15,000 fans. It would be the last time the band would perform with their original quintet. Other major bands of the 1970s played here as well, including Chicago, Edgar and Johnny Winter, The J. Geils Band, and several others.

The park was taken over by Manhattan University in 1991. The college has kept up the traditions of Gaelic Park, as well as doing some significant renovations, and now also uses it for home games of lacrosse, rugby, soccer, and softball.

In early 2007, a $3 million renovation of Gaelic Park began. FieldTurf was laid out to replace the natural pitch, which made it more durable for both American and Gaelic sports. The pitch features sewn-in field markings for the multiple sports played on the ground, with the Gaelic lines given primacy and lined in white. An electronic scoreboard was installed which can be converted to track goals and points for hurling or football, penalty times for lacrosse, balls/strikes/outs for softball, and shots/corners for soccer. In addition, facilities for softball were improved, and the installation of stadium lighting made night games possible.

In April 2019, the banquet hall of Gaelic Park was torn down and replaced with support from the GAA, the Irish Department of Foreign Affairs, and other donations and sponsors.

New York did not compete in the 2020 and 2021 Connacht Senior Football Championship (a precursor to the 2020 and 2021 Senior All Ireland Football Championships) due to COVID-19 travel restrictions, but returned to competition in 2022 with a first round home game at Gaelic Park against Sligo on April 17. On April 8, 2023, New York enjoyed their first Connacht championship win at Gaelic Park, beating Leitrim after a penalty shootout.

== Rugby ==
The first known rugby game was the final game of the Cambridge Vandals North American tour in 1933. The Vandals with a team including several internationals from the United Kingdom prevailed with a late score to maintain their unbeaten record in all eight games played.

Date	Home	Score	Away	Match Type	Attendance	Ref./Notes
September 9, 1933	All Americans	11–14	Cambridge Vandals	1933 Cambridge Vandals North American Tour	c. 1,000	
June 16, 1982	(United States) Eastern RFU	0–41	England	1982 England tour to North American Tour	—N/a	

== See also ==
- List of Gaelic Athletic Association stadiums
