= 2019 London Senior Football Championship =

London S.F.C.
- Season: 2019
- Champions: Tír Chonaill Gaels (19th Title)
- Relegated: Parnells
- All Ireland SCFC: n/a
- Winning Captain: Liam Gavaghan
- Man of the Match: ???
- Winning Coach: Paul Coggins
- Connacht SCFC: Tír Chonaill Gaels

The 2019 London Senior Football Championship was the 116th edition of London GAA's premier gaelic football tournament for senior clubs in London. The tournament consists of 8 teams, with the winner going on to represent London in the Connacht Senior Club Football Championship. The championship starts with a group stage and then progresses to a knock out stage.

Tír Chonaill Gaels were the defending champions after they defeated Fulham Irish in the previous years final after a replay.

Neasden Gaels made the straight bounce back to the senior grade after just one seasons in the Intermediate grade by winning the 2018 London I.F.C. after a 2–13 to 0–13 final victory over St. Joseph's. This was their third I.F.C. triumph overall and their first since 2016.

On 20 October 2019 Tír Chonaill Gaels claimed their 19th S.F.C. crown and second in a row when defeating Fulham Irish in the final by 1–11 to 1–10 at McGovern Park for the second year running.

Parnells were relegated to the 2020 I.F.C. after conceding two walk-overs in the group stages and were subsequently eliminated.

== Team changes ==
The following teams have changed division since the 2018 championship season.

=== To S.F.C. ===
Promoted from 2018 London I.F.C.

- Neasden Gaels – (Intermediate Champions)

=== From S.F.C. ===
Relegated to 2019 London I.F.C.

- Cú Chulainns

== Group stage ==
All 8 teams enter the competition at this stage. The top 2 teams in both groups proceed to the Semi Finals. The 4th placed teams in each group will enter a Relegation Playoff.

=== Group A ===
| Team | Pld | W | L | D | PF | PA | PD | Pts |
|---|---|---|---|---|---|---|---|---|
| Tír Chonaill Gaels | 3 | 2 | 0 | 1 | 43 | 27 | +16 | 5 |
| Neasden Gaels | 3 | 2 | 0 | 1 | 20 | 20 | +0 | 5 |
| North London Shamrocks | 3 | 1 | 2 | 0 | 21 | 33 | -12 | 2 |
| Parnells | 3 | 0 | 3 | 0 | 10 | 14 | -4 | 0 |

Round 1:

- Tír Chonaill Gaels 3-14, 0-7 North London Shamrocks, 7/9/2019,
- Neasden Gaels w/o, scr Parnells, 7/9/2019,

Round 2:

- North London Shamrocks 1-11, 0-10 Parnells, 15/9/2019,
- Neasden Gaels 3–11, 2-14 Tír Chonaill Gaels, 15/9/2019,

Round 3:

- Tír Chonaill Gaels w/o, scr Parnells, 22/9/2019,
- Neasden Gaels w/o, scr North London Shamrocks, 22/9/2019,

=== Group B ===
| Team | Pld | W | L | D | PF | PA | PD | Pts |
|---|---|---|---|---|---|---|---|---|
| Fulham Irish | 3 | 3 | 0 | 0 | 35 | 28 | +7 | 6 |
| St Kiernan's | 3 | 2 | 1 | 0 | 38 | 29 | +9 | 4 |
| Round Towers | 3 | 1 | 2 | 0 | 55 | 35 | +20 | 2 |
| Kingdom Kerry Gaels | 3 | 0 | 3 | 0 | 11 | 47 | -36 | 0 |

Round 1:

- Fulham Irish 1-16, 3-4 Round Towers, 7/9/2019,
- St. Kiernan's 0-13, 1-2 Kingdom Kerry Gaels, 7/9/2019,

Round 2:

- Round Towers 8-10, 0-6 Kingdom Kerry Gaels, 15/9/2019,
- Fulham Irish 2-10, 1-12 St. Kiernan's, 15/9/2019,

Round 3:

- Fulham Irish w/o, scr Kingdom Kerry Gaels, 22/9/2019,
- St. Kiernan's 0-10, 0-8 Round Towers, 22/9/2019,

== Relegation Final ==
Teams who finish in 4th place in Group A and B will play in the Relegation Finals. The defeated finalist will be relegated to the 2020 I.F.C.

- Kingdom Kerry Gaels w/o, scr Parnells,

Due to the fact that Parnells conceded walk-overs for two fixtures during the group stage, they were automatically eliminated from the competition and were relegated.

== Knock-Out Stage ==
=== Semi-finals ===
- Tír Chonaill Gaels 1-11, 0-5 St. Kiernan's, McGovern Park, 6/10/2019,
- Fulham Irish 3-11, 1-11 Neasden Gaels, McGovern Park, 6/10/2019,

=== Final ===
| 20 October 2019; 2:00 pm Final | Tír Chonaill Gaels | 1-11 - 1-10 | Fulham Irish | McGovern Park; Referee: Gavin Dixon (???) |
| 20 October 2019; 2:00 pm Final | | Report | | McGovern Park; Referee: Gavin Dixon (???) |
