= London Junior Football Championship =

Annual Gaelic football competition

- Code: Gaelic football
- Region: London (GAA)
- No. of teams: 8
- Title holders: Cú Chulainns (th title)
- Official website: London GAA

The London Junior Football Championship is the Gaelic football county championship competition in London. Organised by the London County Board of the Gaelic Athletic Association, the current champions are Cú Chulainns, who beat St Josephs in the 2026 final.

Numerous teams competing in the London Senior Football Championship and London Intermediate Football Championship enter home-grown teams, including Tír Chonaill Gaels (since 2011), St Kiernans (since 2019), Parnells, Tara and North London Shamrocks (since 2025). In 2018, Tir Chonaill Gaels became the first home-grown team to win a championship in London.

== Teams ==
8 teams competed in the 2026 Junior Championship:

Club name	Location
Cú Chulainns	Rotherhithe
Gael Londain	Sunbury-on-Thames
Garryowen	Dollis Hill
North London Shamrocks	Palmers Green
Parnells	Harrow
St Josephs	Brentford
Tara	Greenford
St Kiernans	Chipping Barnet

== Roll of honour ==
- 2009 St Josephs
- 2010 Garryowen
- 2011 St Josephs
- 2012 Cu Chulainns
- 2013 St Anthonys
- 2014 Moindearg
- 2015 St Anthonys
- 2016 Tara
- 2017 Thomas McCurtains
- 2018 Tír Chonaill Gaels
- 2019 Dulwich Harps
- 2020 Harlesden Harps
- 2021 St Clarets
- 2022 Wandsworth Gaels
- 2023 Dulwich Harps
- 2024 Tara
- 2025 Tír Chonaill Gaels
- 2026 Cú Chulainns

== Finals listed by year ==
† indicates a team that is now defunct.

(aet) indicates a scoreline won after extra time

(rep) indicates a game won via a replay

Year	Winner	Score		Runner-up	Venue	Source
2026	Cu Chulainns	1-20	0-12	St Josephs	McGovern Park, Ruislip	
2025	Tír Chonaill Gaels	1-15	0-3	Tara	McGovern Park, Ruislip	
2024	Tara	1-15	0-8	St Kiernans	McGovern Park, Ruislip	
2023	Dulwich Harps	1-11	0-12	Neasden Gaels†	McGovern Park, Ruislip	
2022	Wandsworth Gaels	0-10	0-9	Tara	McGovern Park, Ruislip	
2021	St Clarets	1-12	1-5	St Kiernans	McGovern Park, Ruislip	
2020	Harlesden Harps	1-11	1-7	St Clarets	McGovern Park, Ruislip	
2019	Dulwich Harps	1-15	0-7	Wandsworth Gaels	McGovern Park, Ruislip	
2018	Tír Chonaill Gaels	0-10	0-8	Dulwich Harps	McGovern Park, Ruislip	
2017	Thomas McCurtains	1-10	0-12	Dulwich Harps	McGovern Park, Ruislip	
2016	Tara	4-8	2-11	Tír Chonaill Gaels	McGovern Park, Ruislip	
2015	St Anthonys	1-9	1-8	St Clarets	McGovern Park, Ruislip	
2014	Moindearg†	1-5	0-7	Thomas McCurtains	McGovern Park, Ruislip	
2013	St Anthonys	3-7rep	1-11	Tír Chonaill Gaels	McGovern Park, Ruislip	
2012	Cu Chulainns	0-12	0-8	Tír Chonaill Gaels	McGovern Park, Ruislip	
2011	St Josephs	1-11	0-12	Cu Chulainns	McGovern Park, Ruislip	
2010	Garryowen	2-11	0-6	Cu Chulainns	McGovern Park, Ruislip	
2009	St Josephs	3-9	0-10	Dulwich Harps	McGovern Park, Ruislip	
