= London Intermediate Football Championship =

Gaelic sports competition

- Code: Gaelic football
- Founded: 1955; 71 years ago
- Region: London (GAA)
- No. of teams: 8
- Title holders: St Brendans (4th title)
- Most titles: St Brendans (4 titles)
- Official website: London GAA

The London Intermediate Football Championship is the mid-level Gaelic football county championship competition in London. Organised by the London County Board of the Gaelic Athletic Association, the current champions are St Brendans, who beat Parnells in the 2026 final.

== Teams ==
8 teams competed in the 2026 Intermediate Championship:

Club name	Location
Éire Óg	Haringey
Harlesden Harps	Acton
Kingdom Kerry Gaels	Finchley
Parnells	Harrow
St Brendans	Isleworth
St Clarets	Hayes
St Josephs	Brentford
Thomas McCurtains	Goodmayes
Tir Chonaill Gaels	Greenford

== Roll of honour ==
- 1955 Green Roosters
- 1956 Naomh Mhuire
- 1957 Sean McDermotts
- 1958 Cashen Rovers
- 1959 Parnells
- 1960 St Jarlaths
- 1961 Brian Boru
- 1962 Kingdom
- 1963 St Mels
- 1964 Naomh Michael
- 1965 St Finbarrs
- 1966 Garryowen
- 1967 Kingdom
- 1968 Sean Treacys
- 1969 Parnells
- 1970 Geraldines
- 1971 Tir Chonaill Gaels
- 1972 Clan Na nGael
- 1973 St Anthonys
- 1974 Clan Na nGael
- 1975 Parnells
- 1976 Brian Boru
- 1977 St Brendans
- 1978 John Mitchells
- 1979 Aer Lingus
- 1980 St Anges
- 1981 Tir Chonaill Gaels
- 1982 Moindearg
- 1983 Wembley Gaels
- 1984 Thomas McCurtains
- 1985 St Annes
- 1986 Brian Boru
- 1987 Clan Na nGael
- 1988 Acton Gaes
- 1989 St Clarets
- 1990 Naomh Michael
- 1991 St Josephs
- 1992 Western Exiles
- 1993 Heston Gaels
- 1994 Shannon Rovers/Sam Maguires
- 1995 John Mitchells
- 1996 Neasden Gaels
- 1997 unknown
- 1998 Fr Murphys
- 1999 St Clarets
- 2000 unknown
- 2001 St Kiernans
- 2002 Shannon Rovers/Sam Maguires
- 2003 Shalloe Pearce
- 2004 St Clarets
- 2005 Harlesden Harps
- 2006 Fulham Irish
- 2007 Thomas McCurtains
- 2008 Tara
- 2009 St Kiernans
- 2010 Moindearg
- 2011 Round Towers
- 2012 St Brendans
- 2013 Heston Gaels
- 2014 North London Shamrocks
- 2015 Garryowen
- 2016 Neasden Gaels
- 2017 Cú Chulainns
- 2018 Neasden Gaels
- 2019 Thomas McCurtains
- 2020 St Brendans
- 2021 St Josephs
- 2022 Parnells
- 2023 Wandsworth Gaels
- 2024 Dulwich Harps
- 2025 Tara
- 2026 St Brendans

== Finals by year ==
† indicates a team that is now defunct.

(aet) indicates a scoreline won after extra time

(rep) indicates a game won via a replay

Year	Winner	Score		Runner-up	Venue	Source
2026	St Brendans	1-12 (aet)	1-10	Parnells	McGovern Park, Ruislip	
2025	Tara	2-14	1-07	St Brendans	McGovern Park, Ruislip	
2024	Dulwich Harps	2-06	1-07	St Clarets	McGovern Park, Ruislip	
2023	Wandsworth Gaels	0-13	1-05	St Clarets	McGovern Park, Ruislip	
2022	Parnells	3-10	0-02	Garryowen	McGovern Park, Ruislip	
2021	St Josephs	2-10 (aet)	0-15	Harlesden Harps	McGovern Park, Ruislip	
2020	St Brendans	1-10	1-09	Dulwich Harps	McGovern Park, Ruislip	
2019	Thomas McCurtains	0-10	0-07	Tir Chonaill Gaels	McGovern Park, Ruislip	
2018	Neasden Gaels†	2-13	0-13	St Josephs	McGovern Park, Ruislip	
2017	Cu Chulainns	1-11	0-12	Harlesden Harps	McGovern Park, Ruislip	
2016	Neasden Gaels†	1-11	2-06	Harlesden Harps	McGovern Park, Ruislip	
2015	Garryowen	2-12	0-10	St Josephs	McGovern Park, Ruislip	
2014	North London Shamrocks	3-12	0-09	St Brendan's	McGovern Park, Ruislip	
2013	Heston Gaels†	0-11	1-07	Cu Chulainns	McGovern Park, Ruislip	
2012	St Brendans	0-11	0-08	North London Shamrocks	McGovern Park, Ruislip	
2011	Round Towers	0-08 (rep)	0-06	Heston Gaels†	McGovern Park, Ruislip	
2010	Moindearg†	0-10	0-08	Round Towers	McGovern Park, Ruislip	
2009	St Kiernans	1-11	1-02	Heston Gaels†	McGovern Park, Ruislip	
2008	Tara	1-10 (rep)	0-08	North London Shamrocks	McGovern Park, Ruislip	
2007	Thomas McCurtains	1-09	1-08	Heston Gaels†	McGovern Park, Ruislip	
2006	Fulham Irish	1-13	0-10	Moindearg†	McGovern Park, Ruislip	
2005	Harlesden Harps	0-15 (rep)	1-06	Moindearg†	McGovern Park, Ruislip	
2004	St Clarets	1-08	1-06	Round Towers	McGovern Park, Ruislip	
2003	Shalloe Pearce†	2-05	0-08	Harlesden Harps	McGovern Park, Ruislip	
