= 2024 Cork Junior A Football Championship =

Annual Gaelic football competition season

- Dates: 10 November – 8 December 2024
- Teams: 7
- Sponsor: McCarthy Insurance Group
- Champions: Inniscarra (1st title); John O'Callaghan (captain); Daire Holland (manager)
- Runners-up: Ballygarvan; Ray O'Halloran (captain); Liam Sheehan (manager)

Tournament statistics
- Matches played: 6
- Goals scored: 13 (2.17 per match)
- Points scored: 107 (17.83 per match)
- Top scorer(s): Seán O'Donoghue (2–07)

The 2024 Cork Junior A Football Championship was the 126th staging of the Cork Junior A Football Championship since its establishment by the Cork County Board in 1895. The championship ran from 10 November to 8 December 2024.

The final was played on 8 December 2024 at Páirc Uí Rinn in Cork, between Inniscarra and Ballygarvan, in what was their first ever meeting in the final. Inniscarra won the match by 1–07 to 1–06 to claim their first ever championship title.

Inniscarra's Seán O'Donoghue was the championship's top scorer with 2–07.

== Qualification ==
Division	Championship	Champions	#
Avondhu	North Cork Junior A Football Championship	Liscarroll/Churchtown Gaels	
Carbery	Carbery Junior A Football Championship	Kilmacabea	
Carrigdhoun	South East Junior A Football Championship	Ballygarvan	
Duhallow	Duhallow Junior A Football Championship	Castlemagner	
Imokilly	East Cork Junior A Football Championship	Castlemartyr	
Muskerry	Mid Cork Junior A Football Championship	Inniscarra	
Seandún	City Junior A Football Championship	Douglas	

== Divisional championships ==
=== Duhallow final ===
Castlemagner 2–11

Knocknagree 0–07

=== North Cork final ===
Liscarroll Churchtown Gaels 1–13

Charleville 0–10

=== Mid Cork final ===
Inniscarra 0–10, 3–10 (R)

Aghinagh 0–10, 3–09 (R)

=== Carbery final ===
Kilmacabea 1–12

Diarmuid Ó Mathúna's 1–04

=== Cork City final ===
Douglas 1–08

Nemo Rangers 0–10

=== South East final ===
Ballygarvan 5–11

Carrigaline 2–11

=== East Cork final ===
Castlemartyr 1–10

Carrigtwohill 0–12

== Results ==
=== Quarter-finals ===
10 November 2024 Quarter-final	Douglas	1–05 – 0–14	Kilmacabea	Ahamilla Complex
		Report	C McCarthy 0–4, D Gore 0–4, M Collins 0–1, I Jennings 0–1, D McCarthy 0–1, R Hourihane 0–1, J Collins 0–1, E Shanahan 0–1.

10 November 2024 Quarter-final	Liscarroll/Churchtown Gaels	0–08 – 1–12	Ballygarvan	Blarney Grounds
	P O’Shea 0–4 (0–2 f), Colin O’Brien S Delee, S O Callaghan, S Kileen 0–1 each.	Report	E O'Connor 1–3 (0–1 f), R O’Halloran 0–5, D Mackey 0–2, S Brady, N Dowd 0–1 each.

10 November 2024 Quarter-final	Castlemagner	1–08 – 4–08	Inniscarra	Páirc Eoin Mhic Charthaigh
	E Magner 1–1, Cormac O'Sullivan 0–4, D Linehan 0–2.	Report	S O'Donoghue 2–2, D O'Sullivan 1–3, D O'Connell 1–0, S Dineen 0–1, F Horgan 0–1, D O'Keeffe 0–1.

- Castlemartyr received a bye in this round.

=== Semi-finals ===
1 December 2024 Semi-final	Castlemartyr	0–09 – 1–12	Ballygarvan	Páirc Uí Rinn
	M Kelly 0–4 (0–1 f), J McGann 0–2, B McGann, C Joyce, J Stack 0–1 each.	Report	R O’Halloran 0–5, S Brady 1–0, E O’Connor 0–3, S Fenton, P O’Halloran, N Dowd, D O’Mahony 0–1 each.

1 December 2024 Semi-final	Inniscarra	2–09 – 1–09	Kilmacabea	Páirc Uí Rinn
	D O’Connell 1–1 (0–1 m), L O’Connor 0–4 (0–1 f, 0–1 m), J O’Dwyer 1–0, S O’Donoghue 0–2 (0–1 f), D O’Keeffe, S Dineen 0–1 each.	Report	C McCarthy 0–5 (0–4 f), L McCarthy 1–0, D Gore 0–2, I Jennings, E Shanahan 0–1 each.

=== Final ===
8 December 2024 Final	Ballygarvan	1–06 – 1–07	Inniscarra	Páirc Uí Rinn
	S Brady 1–1, E O’Connor 0–3 f, D O’Connor, R O’Halloran 0–1 each.	Report	S O’Donoghue 0–3 (0–1 f), J O'Callaghan 1–0, D O’Keeffe 0–2, L O’Connor (f), S Dineen 0–1 each.	Referee: P Finnegan (Douglas)

== Championship statistics ==
=== Top scorers ===
Rank	Player	County	Tally	Total	Matches	Average
1	Seán O'Donoghue	Inniscarra	2–07	13	3	4.33
2	Evan O'Connor	Ballygarvan	1–09	12	3	4.00
3	Ray O'Halloran	Ballygarvan	0–11	11	3	3.66
4	Colin McCarthy	Kilmacabea	1–06	9	2	4.50
5	Seán Brady	Ballygarvan	2–02	8	3	2.66
