= Graham Brody =

Laois Gaelic football goalkeeper

Personal information
- Born: 29 October 1993 (age 33) Portlaoise, Ireland

Sport
- Sport: Gaelic football
- Position: Goalkeeper
Clubs
- Years: Club
- 2010–? ?: Portlaoise; North London Shamrocks
Club titles
- Laois titles: 7
Inter-county
| Years | County | Apps (scores) |
| 2014–20?? | Laois | 9 |

Graham Brody (born 29 October 1993) is an Irish Gaelic footballer who has played for Portlaoise and the Laois county team.

He made his senior inter-county debut for Laois in 2014, having played at minor and under-21 level in previous years.

Brody received an All-Star nomination in 2018 following a season in which he appeared in the Leinster SFC final and played in the Round 4 qualifier against Monaghan.

He has played for Laois as a "fly goalkeeper".

After finishing his career with Laois and Portlaoise, Brody played when North London Shamrocks won a first London Senior Football Championship title in 2024 and was included on the London senior panel ahead of the 2025 National Football League.
