= Seán O'Donoghue =

Irish hurler

Personal information
- Native name: Seán Ó Donnchú (Irish)
- Nickname: SOD
- Born: 25 January 1996 (age 30) Inniscarra, County Cork, Ireland
- Occupation: Farmer
- Height: 5 ft 10 in (178 cm)

Sport
- Sport: Hurling
- Position: Left corner-back
Clubs
- Years: Club
- 2013-present 2016-2017; 2022 2018: Inniscarra → Muskerry → UCC
Club titles
- Cork titles: 0
College
- Years: College
- 2015-2018: University College Cork
College titles
- Fitzgibbon titles: 0
Inter-county*
Years	County	Apps (scores)
2016-present	Cork	41 (0-00)
Inter-county titles
- Munster titles: 2
- All-Irelands: 0
- NHL: 1
- All Stars: 1
- *Inter County team apps and scores correct as of 18:44, 9 July 2025.

Seán O'Donoghue (born 25 January 1996) is an Irish hurler. At club level, he plays with Inniscarra and at inter-county level with the Cork senior hurling team.

== Early life ==
Born and raised in Inniscarra, County Cork, O'Donoghue played hurling and Gaelic football at all levels as a student at Coláiste Choilm in Ballincollig. He was in his final year as a student when he captained the school and top scored in the 1–11 to 1–10 defeat of Scoil Aodháin to win the All-Ireland PPS SBFC title, having earlier claimed the Munster PPS SBFC title. O'Donoghue later studied at University College Cork and, after captaining the colleges freshers' football team, lined out with the hurling team in the Fitzgibbon Cup.

== Club career ==
O'Donoghue began his club career at juvenile and underage levels as a dual player with the Inniscarra club, before progressing to adult level, again as a dual player, while still a minor in 2013. His performances at club level also resulted in his selection for divisional side Muskerry. It would be nearly a decade before O'Donoghue claimed his first adult-level silverware when, in 2022, he was at centre-forward when Inniscarra won the Cork PIHC title after a 3–12 to 1–17 win over Castlemartyr in a final replay. Two years later, he was the club's top scorer throughout the competition when Inniscarra won the Cork JAFC title after a one-point defeat of Ballygarvan in the final.

== Inter-county career ==
O'Donoghue first played for Cork at minor level in 2014. A dual player with both the hurlers and Gaelic footballers, his season ultimately ended without success with defeats by Limerick and Dublin. He was subsequently a dual player at under-21 level and won a Munster U21FC medal in 2016. O'Donoghue later lined out in the 5–07 to 1–14 defeat by Mayo in the 2016 All-Ireland U21FC final. He was appointed captain of the Cork under-21 football team in 2017.

O'Donoghue made his Cork senior hurling team debut in a Waterford Crystal Cup game against the University of Limerick in January 2015. He played a number of games during the pre-season tournament but was not included on Cork's league or championship panels. O'Donoghue was recalled to the Cork panel in April 2016, however, he played no part in Cork's subsequent championship campaign and was a member of the extended panel in 2017.

O'Donoghue made his first National League start in a three-point defeat of Kilkenny in January 2018 before making his Munster SHC debut four months later in a 2–23 to 1–21 defeat of Clare. He ended that year's provincial competition with a winners' medal after a 2–24 to 3–19 defeat of Clare in the Munster SHC final. O'Donoghue was at corner-back in Cork's 3–32 to 1–22 defeat by Limerick in the 2021 All-Ireland final. He again lined out in that position when Cork lost the 2022 National League final to Waterford.

O'Donoghue was appointed captain by new team manager Pat Ryan in November 2022. He captained Cork against Clare in the 2024 All-Ireland final, but ended on the losing side after a 3–29 to 1–34 extra-time win for Clare. O'Donoghue won his first national silverware in April 2025 when Cork claimed the National Hurling League title with a 3–24 to 0–23 win over Tipperary in the final. Later that season, he won a second Munster SHC medal following Cork's penalty shootout defeat of Limerick in the 2025 Munster final.

== Career statistics ==
As of 5 July 2025.

Team	Year	National League			Munster		All-Ireland		Total	
Team	Year	Division	Apps	Score	Apps	Score	Apps	Score	Apps	Score
Cork	2015	Division 1A	—		—		—		—	
Cork	2016	Division 1A	—		0	0-00	0	0-00	0	0-00
Cork	2017	Division 1A	0	0-00	0	0-00	0	0-00	0	0-00
Cork	2018	Division 1A	5	0-00	5	0-00	1	0-00	11	0-00
Cork	2019	Division 1A	5	0-00	4	0-00	1	0-00	10	0-00
Cork	2020	Division 1A	2	0-00	1	0-00	2	0-00	5	0-00
Cork	2021	Division 1A	1	0-00	1	0-00	4	0-00	6	0-00
Cork	2022	Division 1A	4	0-00	4	0-00	2	0-00	10	0-00
Cork	2023	Division 1A	1	0-00	2	0-00	—		3	0-00
Cork	2024	Division 1A	4	0-01	4	0-00	4	0-00	12	0-01
Cork	2025	Division 1A	4	0-01	5	0-00	1	0-00	10	0-01
Career total			26	0-02	26	0-00	15	0-00	67	0-02

== Honours ==
Coláiste Choilm

- All-Ireland PPS Senior B Football Championship: 2014
- Munster PPS Senior B Football Championship: 2014

Inniscarra

- Cork Premier Intermediate Hurling Championship: 2022
- Cork Junior A Football Championship: 2024
- Mid Cork Junior A Football Championship: 2024

Cork

- Munster Senior Hurling Championship: 2018, 2025
- National Hurling League: 2025
- Munster Under-21 Football Championship: 2016

Individual

- The Sunday Game Team of the Year (1): 2025
- All Star Award (1): 2025

Sporting positions
Preceded by Stephen Cronin	Cork under-21 football team captain 2017	Succeeded by Liam O'Donovan
Preceded by Mark Coleman	Cork senior hurling team captain 2023-2024	Succeeded by Robert Downey
