= St Kiernan's GFC =

Gaelic football club in London

St Kiernan's
- Naomh Thiarnáin
- Founded: 1985
- County: London
- Nickname: The Magpies
- Colours: Black and White
- Grounds: King George V Playing Fields, Totteridge
- Coordinates: 51°38′28″N 0°11′37″W

Playing kits
Standard colours

Senior Club Championships
	All Ireland	Great Britain champions	London champions
Football:	-	-	2

St Kiernan's Gaelic Football Club is a Gaelic football club based in the London Borough of Barnet.

It currently fields teams, men's and ladies', from Under 5's up to Adult (Men's & Ladies'), including Senior, Junior (London-born development team) and Reserve at men's adult level with in excess of 300 members throughout the club.

== History ==
The club was founded in September 1984 in St Anthonys parish, Edgware; it was named in honour of its founding president and parish priest, Fr. Tom Kiernan; Kiernan is a variant of Ternan.

Three years after the club's formation in 1988 St. Kiernan's moved to Montrose Playing Fields in Burnt Oak, remaining at the pitch until 2018. As of 2022, the club are based at King George V Playing Fields south of Barnet, with development of clubhouse and indoor training facility due for completion in 2023.

Following a number of barren years at senior level, the club was relegated to the Intermediate ranks in 2008 triggering a full-scale reset, resulting in the promotion of players from the successful Minor and U21 team up to adult level. This resulted in the club winning its second London Intermediate Football Championship, securing promotion back to Senior at the first attempt. Having secured promotion as Intermediate champions in 2009, the club reached five consecutive semi final's between 2010 and 2014, and a final in 2015. Kiernan's finally won their first London Senior Football Championship in 2016 defeating Tir Chonaill Gaels 0-13 - 0–5; and then advancing to the 2016–17 All-Ireland Senior Club Football Championship where they lost to Slaughtneil (Derry).

They won a second London Senior Football Championship in 2021, defeating Fulham Irish in the final on a scoreline of 1-13 - 0–12. They advanced to the 2021–22 All-Ireland Senior Club Football Championship, losing to Tourlestrane of County Sligo.

== Notable players ==
- Cathal Óg Greene — was a prominent member of the Laois county football team in the early 2010s. He won the All-Ireland Minor Football Championship with Laois in 2003 and was a member of the London county football team that reached the 2013 Connacht Senior Football Championship final. Cathal played midfield for St Kiernans in the 2016 London Senior Football Championship final as well as managing St Kiernans to the London Senior Football Championship in 2021 and 2022.
- Barry O'Shea — All-Ireland winner with the Kerry county football team in the 1997 All-Ireland Senior Football Championship against Mayo.
- James Moran — current midfielder who played with the Mayo county football team in the early 2010s, winning the 2011 FBD Insurance League.
- Wayne O'Sullivan — former Arsenal F.C., Plymouth Argyle F.C. and Exeter City F.C. footballer played with the club from under age including for the senior team as well as the London county football team in the late 2000s.
- John-Joe O'Toole — current Mansfield Town F.C. defender, who started out at Watford F.C in the EFL Championship as well as gaining honours for the Republic of Ireland national under-21 football team, played for the club right through the under-age ranks up to senior level before embarking on a full-time career as an association footballer.

== Honours ==
Mens

Senior

- London Senior Football Championship (3): 2016, 2021, 2022
- London Division 1 Senior Football League (4): 2016, 2017, 2022, 2024
- Tipperary Cup (3): 2011, 2015, 2016
- Conway Cup (4): 2015, 2016, 2021, 2024

Intermediate

- London Intermediate Football Championship (2): 2001, 2009
- London Division 2 Intermediate Football League (1): 2004
- Murphy Cup (1) : 2009
- Shields Cup (1) : 2009

Junior

- London Junior Football Championship (1): 1997
- London Division 3 Junior Football League (2) : 1997,2025
- McArdle Cup (1) : 1989
- Mullarkey Cup (1) : 2025

Underage

- London Under-21 Football Championship (3): 2008, 2009, 2011
- London Minor Football Championship (4): 1999, 2001, 2005, 2007

Reserves

- London Reserve Championship (3): 2011, 2013, 2015
- London Reserve League :(3) 2013,2015,2019

Ladies

- London LGFA Division 2 League (1) : 2025
- Tom O'Connor Cup (1) : 2025
- London LGFA Junior Football Championship (1) : 2025
- All - Britain LGFA Junior Football Championship (1) : 2025
