= Padraig McGoldrick =

Irish Gaelic footballer

Padraig McGoldrick is a Gaelic footballer.

== Career ==
McGoldrick won an All-Ireland Junior Football Championship with the Sligo county team. More recently, he has plied his trade with the London county team.

On 26 May 2013, McGoldrick - playing for London - missed a penalty and was sent off in London's 1-12 - 0–14 victory over Sligo - their first victory in the Connacht Senior Football Championship since 1977.
