= Scott Doran =

Irish Gaelic footballer (1974–2018)

Personal information
- Native name: Scot Ó Deoráin (Irish)
- Born: 23 January 1974 Kilmore, County Wexford, Ireland
- Died: 29 December 2018 (aged 44) Moulton, Northwich, Cheshire, UK
- Height: 5 ft 10 in (178 cm)

Sport
- Sport: Gaelic football
- Position: Full-forward
Clubs
- Years: Club
- Kilmore; Neasden Gaels
Club titles
- Wexford titles: 0
Inter-county
- Years: County
- 1992–2004 2005 2007: Wexford; London; Wexford
Inter-county titles
- Leinster titles: 0
- All-Irelands: 0
- NFL: 0
- All Stars: 0

Scott Doran (23 January 1974 – 29 December 2018) was an Irish Gaelic footballer who played as a forward for club sides Kilmore and Neasden Gaels, at senior inter-county level with Wexford and London and at inter-provincial level with Leinster.

== Biography ==
Doran began his Gaelic football career winning five county titles at underage levels with the Kilmore club. After transferring to the nearby St Anne's club in Rathangan in 1998, Doran transferred back with Kilmore in 2000 and won a Wexford Junior Championship medal in 2003.

Having already played with the county minor and under-21 teams, Doran's Wexford senior football career spanned 14 years. After making his debut in the National Football League in October 1992, he went on to score 25-174 in 103 competitive appearances with Wexford until the end of the 2004 National League campaign when he opted out of the championship panel.

Doran subsequently joined the Neasden Gaels club in North London and played for the London senior team in the 2005 Connacht Championship, but returned to the Wexford senior team in 2007 after a three-year absence, making a further five appearances before his eventual retirement.

Doran died suddenly on 29 December 2018 at the age of 44.
