= 2004 Cork Junior A Hurling Championship =

- Dates: 17 October – 14 November 2004
- Teams: 7
- Sponsor: TSB Bank
- Champions: Ballygarvan (1st title); Joe Kennefick (captain); Jim Dowd (manager)
- Runners-up: Grenagh; John Russell (captain); Brendan O'Driscoll (manager)

Tournament statistics
- Matches played: 8
- Goals scored: 20 (2.5 per match)
- Points scored: 210 (26.25 per match)
- Top scorer(s): Liam Dillon (1–33)

The 2004 Cork Junior A Hurling Championship was the 107th staging of the Cork Junior A Hurling Championship since its establishment by the Cork County Board in 1895. The championship ran from 17 October to 14 November 2004.

The final was played on 14 November 2004 at Páirc Uí Rinn in Cork, between Ballygarvan and Grenagh, in what was their first ever meeting in the final. Ballygarvan won the match by 3–07 to 1–12 to claim their first ever championship title.

Ballygarvan's Liam Dillon was the championship's top scorer with 1–33.

== Qualification ==
Division	Championship	Champions
Avondhu	North Cork Junior A Hurling Championship	Ballygiblin
Carbery	South West Junior A Hurling Championship	Clonakilty
Carrigdhoun	South East Junior A Hurling Championship	Ballygarvan
Duhallow	Duhallow Junior A Hurling Championship	Kilbrin
Imokilly	East Cork Junior A Hurling Championship	Sarsfields
Muskerry	Mid Cork Junior A Hurling Championship	Grenagh
Seandún	City Junior A Hurling Championship	St. Finbarr's

== Results ==
=== First round ===
26 September 2004 First round	Ballygarvan	0-15 - 1-07	St. Finbarr's	Carrigaline
	L Dillons 0-10, S White 0-3, S O'Leary 0-1, D O'Sullivan 0-1.		P Landers 1-0, G O'Regan 0-2, N Hosford 0-2, S Fuller 0-1, K McTiernan 0-1, K O'Brien 0-1.

17 October 2004 First round	Clonakilty	1-11 - 0-13	Sarsfields	Páirc Uí Rinn
	D Murphy 0-6, Timmy Anglin 1-1, P O'Regan 0-3, M Nolan 0-1.		C Duggan 0-5, T Óg Murphy 0-4, J O'Connor 0-2, G O'Neill 0-1, J Barry 0-1.

17 October 2004 First round	Grenagh	1-21 - 1-14	Ballygiblin	Páirc Uí Chaoimh
	D Dalton 1-3, D Dorgan 0-5, G Russell 0-4, S Coleman 0-4, J Russell 0-2, A O'Neill 0-1, T Kenny 0-1, D Daly 0-1.		M Allen 1-4, D Moher 0-7, K Duggan 0-1, T Tierney 0-1, J Murphy 0-1.

=== Semi-finals ===
16 October 2004 Semi-final	Ballygarvan	1-11 - 1-11	Kilbrin	Coachford Sportsfield
	L Dillon 0-7, S O'Leary 1-1, K Ashman 0-1, M Sheedy 0-1, W Halloran 0-1.		D Crowley 1-4, S O'Riordan 0-4, D Aherne 0-2, T McMahon 0-1.

24 October 2004 Semi-final replay	Ballygarvan	4-08 - 2-14 (aet)	Kilbrin	Páirc Uí Chaoimh
	S White 1-2, K Ashman 1-1, C O'Connor 1-0, A Butler 1-0, S O'Leary 0-3, F Barry 0-1, W O'Halloran 0-1.		D Crowley 2-7, N O'Callaghan 0-3, I O'Sullivan 0-1, S O'Riordan 0-1, D Aherne 0-1, T O'Riordan 0-1.

30 October 2004 Semi-final	Grenagh	1-15 - 0-11	Clonakilty	Páirc Uí Rinn
	D Dorgan 0-7, D Dalton 1-1, A O'Neill 0-2, D Daly 0-2, G Russell 0-2, C Kenny 0-1.		D Murphy 0-9, K Kennedy 0-1, M Nolan 0-1.

7 November 2004 Semi-final 2nd replay	Ballygarvan	2-20 - 1-20 (aet)	Kilbrin	Páirc Uí Rinn
	L Dillon 1-12, G White 1-0, K Ashman 0-2, G Spillane 0-2, C O'Connor 0-1, S O'Leary 0-1, S White 0-1, A Butler 0-1.		D Crowley 0-7, D Aherne 0-4, I O'Sullivan 0-4, D Breen 1-0, N O'Reilly 0-2, T McMahon 0-1, N O'Callaghan 0-1, S O'Riordan 0-1.

=== Final ===
14 November 2004 Final	Ballygarvan	3-07 - 1-12	Grenagh	Páirc Uí Rinn
	S O'Leary 2-0, L Dillon 0-4, K Ashman 1-0, C O'Connor 0-1, M Dowd 0-1, G White 0-1.		D Dorgan 0-6, S Coleman 1-1, T Kenny 0-1, J Russell 0-1, A O'Neill 0-1, D Dalton 0-1, G Russell 0-1.

== Championship statistics ==
=== Top scorers ===
Rank	Player	Club	Tally	Total	Matches	Average
1	Liam Dillon	Ballygarvan	1-33	36	4	9.00
2	Damien Crowley	Kilbrin	3-18	27	3	9.00
3	Diarmuid Dorgan	Grenagh	0-18	18	3	6.00
4	Shane O'Leary	Ballygarvan	3-06	15	5	3.00
4	Denis Murphy	Clonakilty	0-15	15	2	7.50
6	Dean Dalton	Grenagh	2-05	11	3	3.66
7	Ken Ashman	Ballygarvan	2-04	10	5	2.00
8	Stephen White	Ballygarvan	1-06	9	5	1.80
9	Séamus Coleman	Ballygarvan	1-05	8	3	2.66
10	Michael Allen	Ballygiblin	1-04	7	1	7.00
10	Dave Moher	Ballygiblin	0-07	7	1	7.00
10	Gerry Russell	Grenagh	0-07	7	3	2.33
10	Diamruid Aherne	Kilbrin	0-07	7	3	2.33

=== Miscellaneous ===
- Ballygiblin qualified for the championship for the very first time in their history.
