= Fulham Irish GAA Club =

Fulham Irish
- Founded: 2006
- County: London
- Colours: Black and Green
- Grounds: Wormwood Scrubs
- Coordinates: 51°31′17″N 00°14′20″W

Playing kits
Standard colours

Senior Club Championships
| | All Ireland | Great Britain champions | London champions |
|---|---|---|---|
| Football: | - | - | 3 |

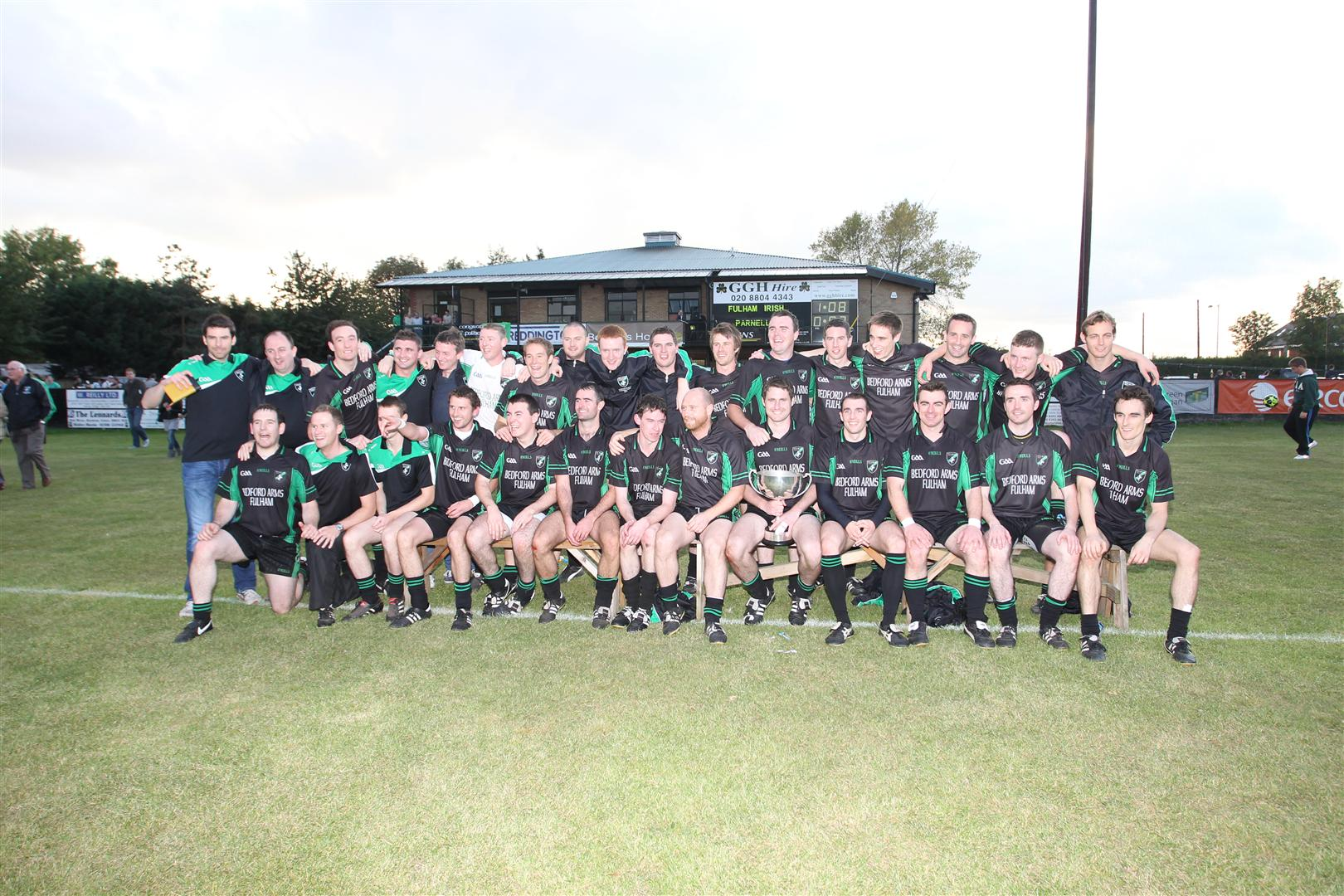
London Senior Football Champions 2011

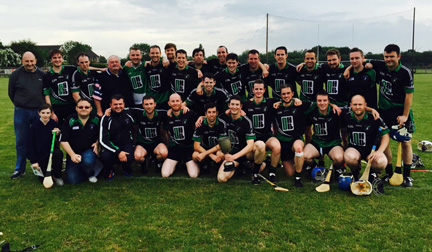
Ronan Cup Winners 2015

Fulham Irish GAA Club is a Gaelic Football and Hurling Club who play on Wormwood Scrubs in West London.

Fulham Irish GAA hold the unique status of being the only club in London to offer dual players Senior Football & Senior Hurling. It is a unique achievement for a Club that was established in 2006 & only formed a hurling team as recently as 2011.

The Fulham Irish Hurling Team defeated Granuaille in the London Intermediate Championship Final in 2012 to gain promotion to the top tier of London Hurling. The team completed a remarkable journey for the club by joining the Senior ranks of the London Hurling fraternity in only their 2nd year of existence. Managed by Dublin Man, Anthony Scullion, they won the London Intermediate Championship at the second time of asking. They had lost the final by the narrowest of margins in their first year in 2011.

The Fulham Irish Footballers won the London Intermediate Championship in their first attempt in 2006 after the London County Board allowed them to enter a team in Intermediate Competitions. The team went on to win the British Provincial title in the same year. The Footballers progressed to win every domestic honour in London culminating with their first Senior Championship win on 16 October 2011.

The Fulham Irish Ladies Team was established in 2008 and like the footballers has progressed rapidly through the ranks and now sits comfortably at the top table. The Ladies team won the London Junior Championship in 2010 & followed up with the Intermediate Championship in 2011. The Ladies team won no fewer than 4 domestic cups in 2011.

== History ==
Fulham Irish GAA Club was formed in January 2006 by a group of young Irish people who were working in the city of London. The group wanted to give people a chance to play Gaelic Football in London without travelling to the far West or North of London to existing clubs. Fulham Irish are the current London Senior Football Champions. The club were granted permission by the London County Board to participate in the London Intermediate Football Championship but had to begin in the lowest division of the London league. The club first fielded a team in April 2006 in a league game which they won at Ruislip against North London Shamrocks. The club attracts many players due to its central location. In 2006 the club created history by winning the London Intermediate Championship and the British Championship in its first year. The initial Fulham Irish Committee was spearheaded by Liam Barry (County Limerick) Chairman, Michael Rice (County Kerry) Secretary and John Doyle (County Carlow) Treasurer. Ken McGrath (County Waterford) was the first club captain. By the beginning of the 2008 season Fulham Irish had progressed to the top level of all competitions in London. David Connolly (County Monaghan) became Captain in 2008 and led the club to their first Division 1 League Title together with the Tipperary Cup. The club suffered just one defeat in 2008, a 1-point loss in a replay of the semi-final of the senior Championship.

Fulham Irish started a Ladies Team in 2008. The Ladies team progressed to the London Junior Championship Final in their first year and lost the final by 2 points to the long established Holloway Gaels. In 2009 they reached the Junior Championship Final but lost out to a stronger Kingdom Kerry Gaels side. 2010 was the year for the Ladies team as they had a clean sweep of all Junior trophies, winning the Junior Championship Final against Clonbony 3–16 to 0–2, the Junior League Final against Dulwich Harps 3–13 to 1–2, The Tom O Connor Cup, The Southwark Festival Cup and the Anne Dunning Memorial Cup. In 2011 they won the London Intermediate Championship, just 12 months after winning the Junior Championship.

In 2011 it was agreed that the club would form a Hurling Team. In their first year, the team reached the London Intermediate Hurling Championship Final, losing narrowly to a strong Michael Cusack's side who had been beaten in the final the previous year. In their second year of existence the hurlers won the London Intermediate Hurling Championship, and were promoted to the senior grade.

The club is currently one of the top clubs in London and has developed an underage structure along with developing its own GAA pitch in Fulham.

Fulham Irish won no fewer than 8 Cups in 2011 including the London Senior Football Championship on 16 October 2011 at Ruislip beating Parnells 1–08 to 0-07. The club was just over five years old at the time. The Club progressed to play the Connacht Champions (St Brigid's GAA (Roscommon)) in the All-Ireland Club Quarter-Final on 4 December 2011. Sean Maguire from Lavey in County Cavan captained Fulham Irish to its first Senior Championship. The winning team lined out as follows: Declan Traynor (Meath), Gary O'Hare (Down), Conor McClean (Down), Martin Conway (Derry), Aidan Savage (Antrim), Shane Mulligan (Monaghan), John Boyce (Galway), Lorcan Mulvey (Cavan), Paddy Walsh (Carlow), Stephen Molumby (Dublin), Harry Murphy (Mayo), Iomar Barrett (Galway), David Connolly (Monaghan), Sean Maguire (Cavan), John Ryan (Tipperary) Subs Used: Fearghal McVey (Derry), Noel Nicholson (Galway), Marty Hughes (Tyrone), Padhraig McKernan (Down), John Reilly (Mayo).

In 2017 Fulham Irish won the London Senior Football Championship again, beating Tir Chonaill Gaels in the final, a late point from Tyrone great Owen Mulligan sealing the victory by the minimum. The team was managed by two-time All-Ireland winner, Greg McCartan. Jonathan Tavey; Roger Morgan, Conor Hyde, Connor Murphy; John Gilfedder, Hurl Dockry, Aidan Savage; Michael Murphy (0-1), David O'Connor (0-1); Liam Turley, Owen Mulligan (0-5), Liam Staunton (0-3), Rowan Turley, Marty Hughes (0-1), Peadar Friel (0-2)

Subs used: Daniel Eastwood (0-2) for Peadar Friel, Shea Quinn for Liam Staunton, Sean O'Sullivan for Rowan Turley

On 21 January 2018, Fulham Irish were defeated 1-4 3-8 Vs Corofin in the All-Ireland Senior Club Championship Quarter-Final in Ruislip.

On 6 June 2021, Fulham Irish won the delayed final of the 2020 London Senior Football Championship, beating Tir Chonaill Gaels after extra time on a score line of 2–17 to 0–16.

== Notable players ==
- Owen Mulligan — 2003, 2005, 2008 All-Ireland SFC winner with Tyrone
- Lorcan Mulvey — All Star nominee
- Jack Goulding

== Honours ==
- London Senior Football Championship - 2011, 2017, 2020
- London Intermediate Hurling Championship – 2012
- London Intermediate Football Championship - 2006
- Ladies Senior Cup - 2015
- Ladies Senior League - 2015
- Ronan Cup (Hurling) - 2011, 2015
- Tipperary Cup (Senior Football) – 2008, 2012
- Senior Football League Division 2 - 2011
- McCullogh Cup (Hurling) - 2011
- Ladies Intermediate Championship - 2011
- Mary Feehan Cup (Ladies Football) - 2011
- British Junior Championship (Ladies Football) - 2011
- British Provincial 9s (Ladies Football) - 2011
- Ladies Junior Championship - 2010
- Tom O’Connor Cup (Ladies Football) - 2010
- Reserve Football Championship - 2009, 2017, 2020
- Senior Football League Division 1 - 2008
- Conway Cup (Senior Football) - 2008
- British Provincial Championship - 2006
