= St Brendan's GFC (London) =

Gaelic football club

St Brendan's
- Nh. Breandán C.L.G
- Founded: 1956
- County: London
- Colours: Green, White
- Grounds: Greenford

Playing kits
Standard colours

St Brendan's is a Gaelic Athletic Association club, based in London, England, that plays Gaelic football.

== History ==
St Brendan's GFC was founded in 1956, in the Old Botwell Paris Hall, in Middlesex. Although St Brendan's was initially formed as a combined hurling and football club, the focus shifted to Gaelic football by the 1960s.

Based in south west London, the club serves the areas of Twickenham, Teddington, Richmond, Whitton, Hounslow, Ealing and Feltham. The club has had success in the London Championships, winning thee Senior Championships and two Intermediate Championships.

== Honours ==
- London Senior Football Championship (3): 1994, 2002, 2006 (Note: In the 2006/2007 campaign, they reached the All-Ireland Quarterfinals losing to Dr. Crokes)
- London Intermediate Football Championship (2): 2012, 2020 (Note: The 2020 Intermediate Championship final was played in June 2021, having been delayed due to Covid)
- Murphy Cup (3): 2017–2019 (Note: St Brendan's won the Murphy Cup for three consecutive years from 2017 to 2019)

== See also ==
- London GAA
