= King George V Playing Fields, Totteridge =

Sports venue in Totteridge, London, England

Coordinates: 51.6412°N 0.1937°W

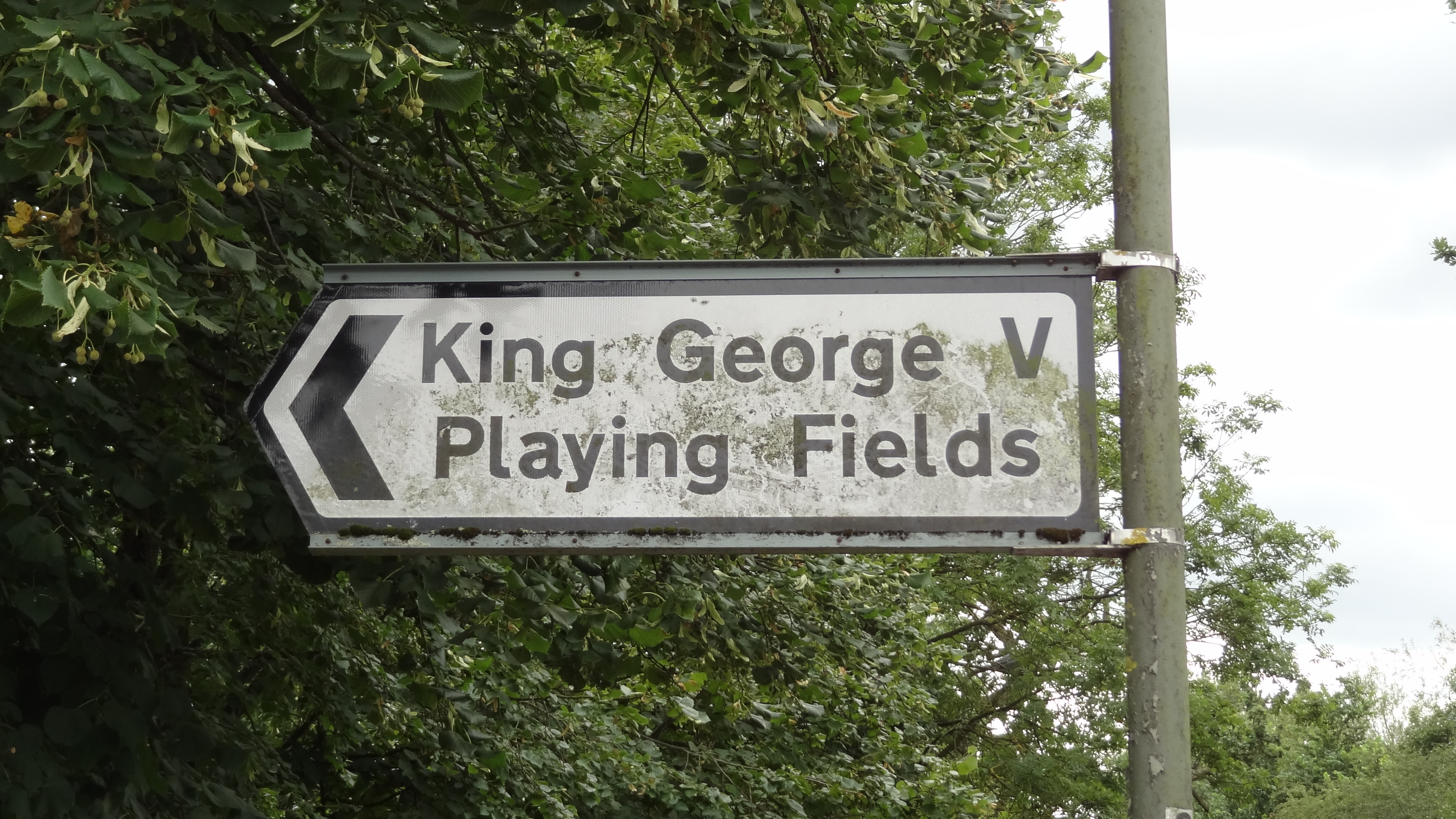
Sign to remaining part of King George V Playing Fields

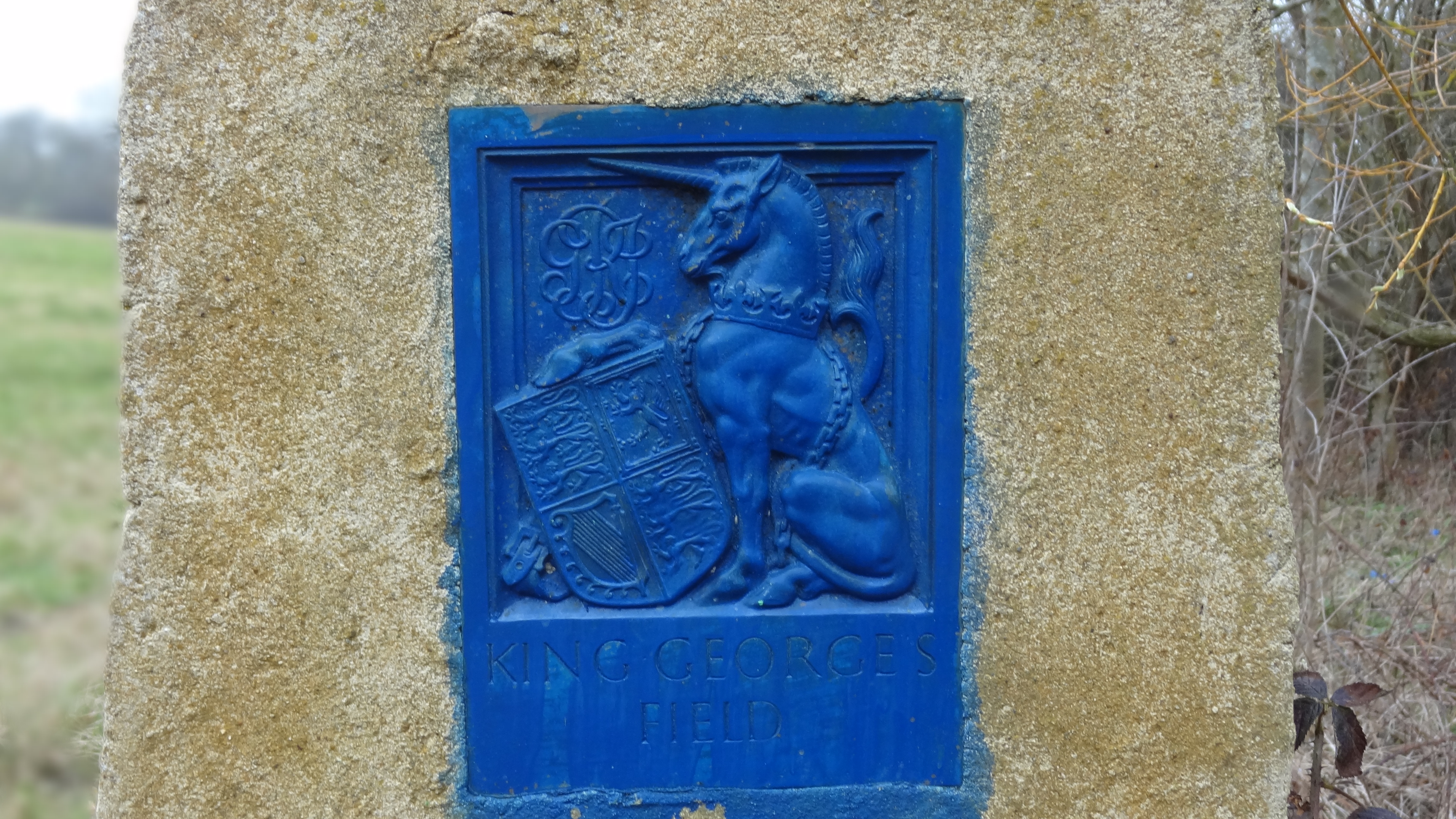
Logo on stone plinth in field removed in 2012

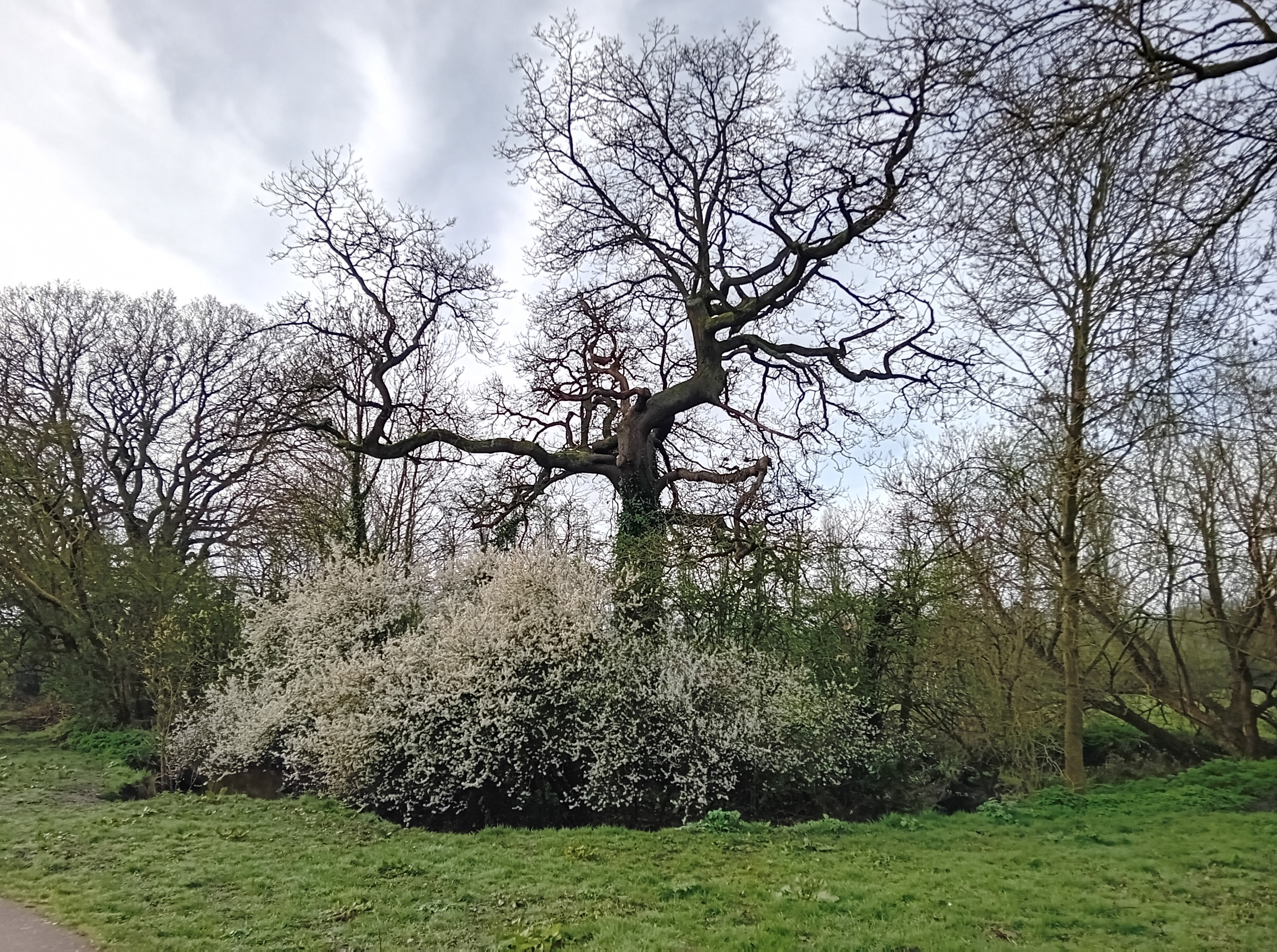
Oak and blackthorn in King George V Playing Fields, Totteridge

King George V Playing Fields, also called King George's Field, is an area of playing fields of approximately 14 acres (5.7 ha) in Totteridge in the London Borough of Barnet. It is located southeast of the junction of Barnet Lane and Dollis Brook.

Following the death of King George V in 1936 the King George's Fields Foundation was established to give grants for the establishment of playing fields, the work of the foundation is now undertaken by charity Fields in Trust. The Totteridge fields were originally the third largest of all King George's Fields at 93 acres (38 ha), and the Foundation gave a grant of £3,000 towards the total capital cost of £62,335. King George V Playing Fields, Totteridge have been legally protected since July 1943. The rules of the Foundation required permanent preservation of the area as a King George's Field as a memorial to the king, but less than a fifth of the original size remains.

The Master Atlas of Greater London shows King George's Fields extending west across Barnet Lane into what is now a farmer's field, and there used to be two 'King George's Fields' logos on stone plinths in the entrance to the field, but in 2012 the plinths were vandalised and the logos removed. North of the current King George's Fields is an area of public open space called Barnet Playing Fields, an area of 72 acres (29 ha) laid out in 1926. It is unclear whether this was ever part of King George's Fields.

Since 2016 it has been the home of St Kiernan's GFC, one of London's leading Gaelic football clubs.

== See also ==
- List of King George V Playing Fields in London
