= List of King George V Playing Fields in London =

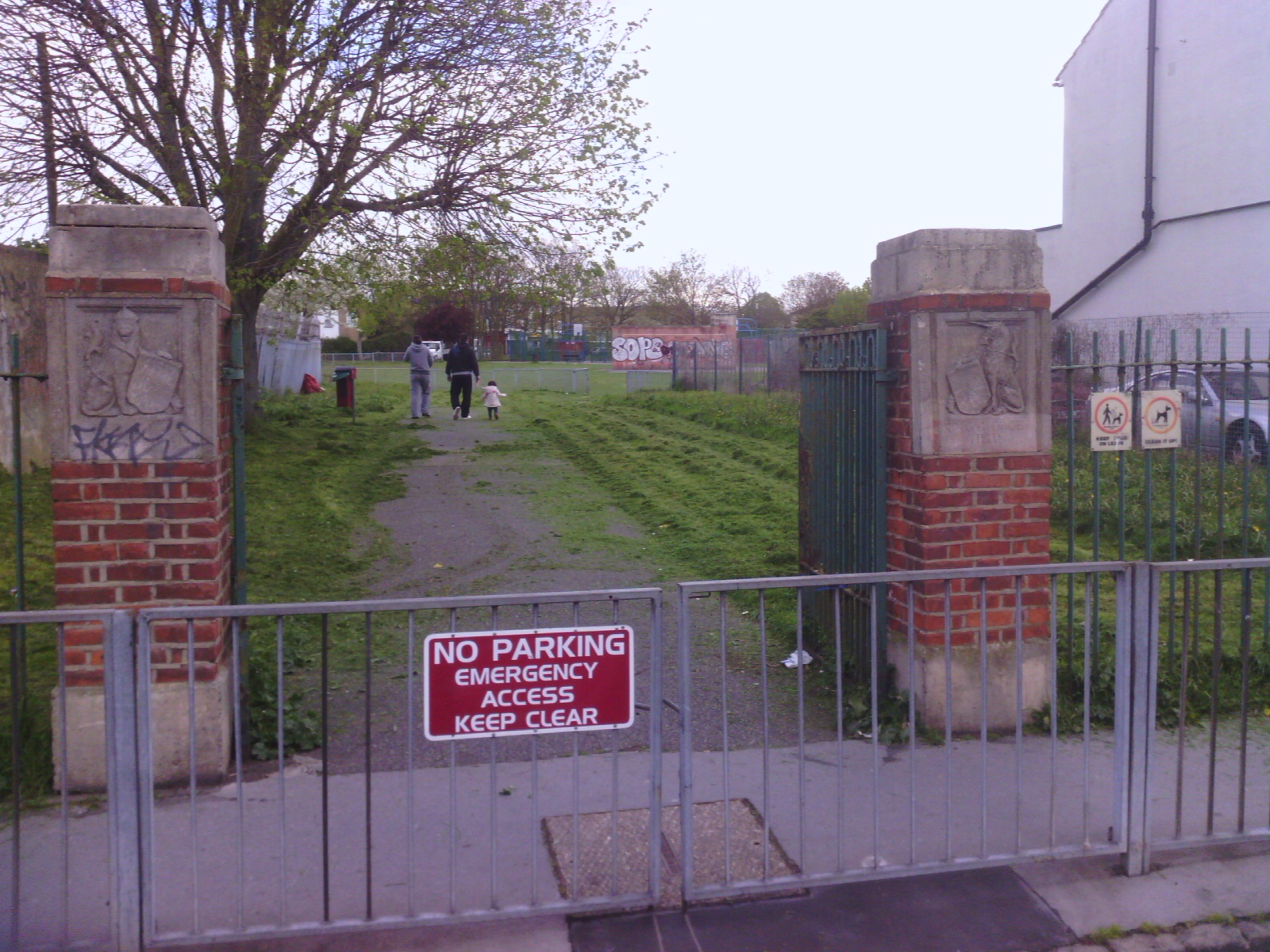
Croydon

London
| Location | Formal name | Local name (if any) | National Grid Reference | Dates | | External links |
| Location | Formal name | Local name (if any) | National Grid Reference | Purchase | Opening | External links |
|---|---|---|---|---|---|---|
| Bermondsey | King George's Field | All Saints' Churchyard | TQ 352 793 | | | "King George's Field, Southwark". London Gardens Online. |
| Camberwell | Addington Square Garden | | TQ 325 775 | | | "Addington Square Garden, Southwark". London Gardens Online. Archived from the original on 9 October 2012. |
| City of London | King George's Field | n/a | TQ 336 809 | | | |
| Croydon | King Georges Field | n/a | TQ 329 670 | | | London Borough of Croydon |
| Custom House | King George V Park | n/a | TQ 416 813 | | | London Borough of Newham, Find your local park |
| Dagenham | King George V Memorial Field | n/a | TQ 492 836 | 1904 | | "Revamp for King George V Field" |
| Enfield | King George V Playing Fields | King G's or Southbury Playing Fields | TQ 340 970 | | | |
| Enfield (Edmonton) | King George V Playing Fields | Delhi Field or Delhi Gardens | TQ 337 948 | | | "Parks & Gardens UK ref 7876" |
| Ham, London | King George's Field | n/a | TQ 169 728 | | | |
| Hanwell | King George V Playing Field | King George's Playground, Hanwell Heath, Poors Piece (former) | TQ 1532 7987 | | | |
| Havering | King Georges Playing Fields | Mawney Park | TQ 499 896 | | | |
| Lower Morden | King George’s Playing Field | n/a | TQ 241 668 | | | Parks in Merton (PDF) |
| Monken Hadley | King George's Fields | n/a | TQ 249 969 | | | image |
| Penge | King George's Field | Betts Park | TQ 347 695 | 1937 | | Betts Park |
| Sidcup | King George's Field | King George's Recreation Ground | TQ 4604 7253 | | | London Borough of Bexley |
| Southall | King George's Playing Field | n/a | TQ128 822 | | | "Parks & Gardens UK ref 9379" |
| Tolworth | King George's Field | Corinthian Casuals Football Club | TQ 193 651 | | 1953 | UK Running Track Directory |
| Tottenham | Markfield Park | (opened as Markfield Recreation Ground King George's Field) | TQ 3410 8866 | | 1938 | Friends of Markfield Park |
| Totteridge | King George V Playing Fields | n/a | TQ 2509 9518 | | | |
| Worcester Park | Salisbury Road | | TQ 214 650 | | | |

== See also ==
- King George's Fields
