= Paul Coggins =

Gaelic football manager

Sport
Inter-county management
- Years: Team
- 2011–2015: London

Paul Coggins is a Gaelic football manager and former player. He played for London, and later managed the county from 2011 until 2015. Coggins later managed Tír Chonaill Gaels, St Kiernan's junior team and the London junior team.

Coggins played his club football for Desmonds. He played for London against Galway in the 1999 Connacht Senior Football Championship (SFC) quarter-final. He was also involved in the 1995 All-Ireland Junior Football Championship final, after a semi-final victory over Kerry.

Coggins managed Tír Chonaill Gaels. He then almost led London to victory over Mayo in 2011, during his first season in charge. He led London to a first ever All-Ireland SFC qualifier victory later that year, against Fermanagh, in what was the team's first championship victory since Leitrim, in 1977. He then led London to their first Connacht SFC victory in 36 years over Sligo in 2013, and then onwards to a first appearance in the Connacht SFC final. Coggins resigned as London manager in 2015. After his resignation, The Irish Post described him – in an article – as "the type of man who would take exception to a full article being dedicated to his achievements".

Coggins resumed managing with the Tír Chonaill Gaels junior team before taking his first senior club management role since 2009 in 2018. He led Tír Chonaill Gaels to a junior title in 2018. Coggins then led the St Kiernan's junior team to the 2024 county final. He began managing the London junior team for the 2025 championship. He won his first game, against Warwickshire.

Married to Ann, Coggins is originally from County Roscommon. He is a native of Granlahan. In 2017, he began writing the column "Cog's Corner" for The Irish Post. His wife Ann died at the end of 2022, and the gap in his managerial roles above included time spent away from the game as her carer.

Sporting positions
Preceded by Noel Dunning	London Senior Football Manager; 2011–2015	Succeeded by Ciarán Deely
