= Ballygarvan, County Cork =

Village in County Cork, Ireland

Ballygarvan Baile Garbháin
- Village
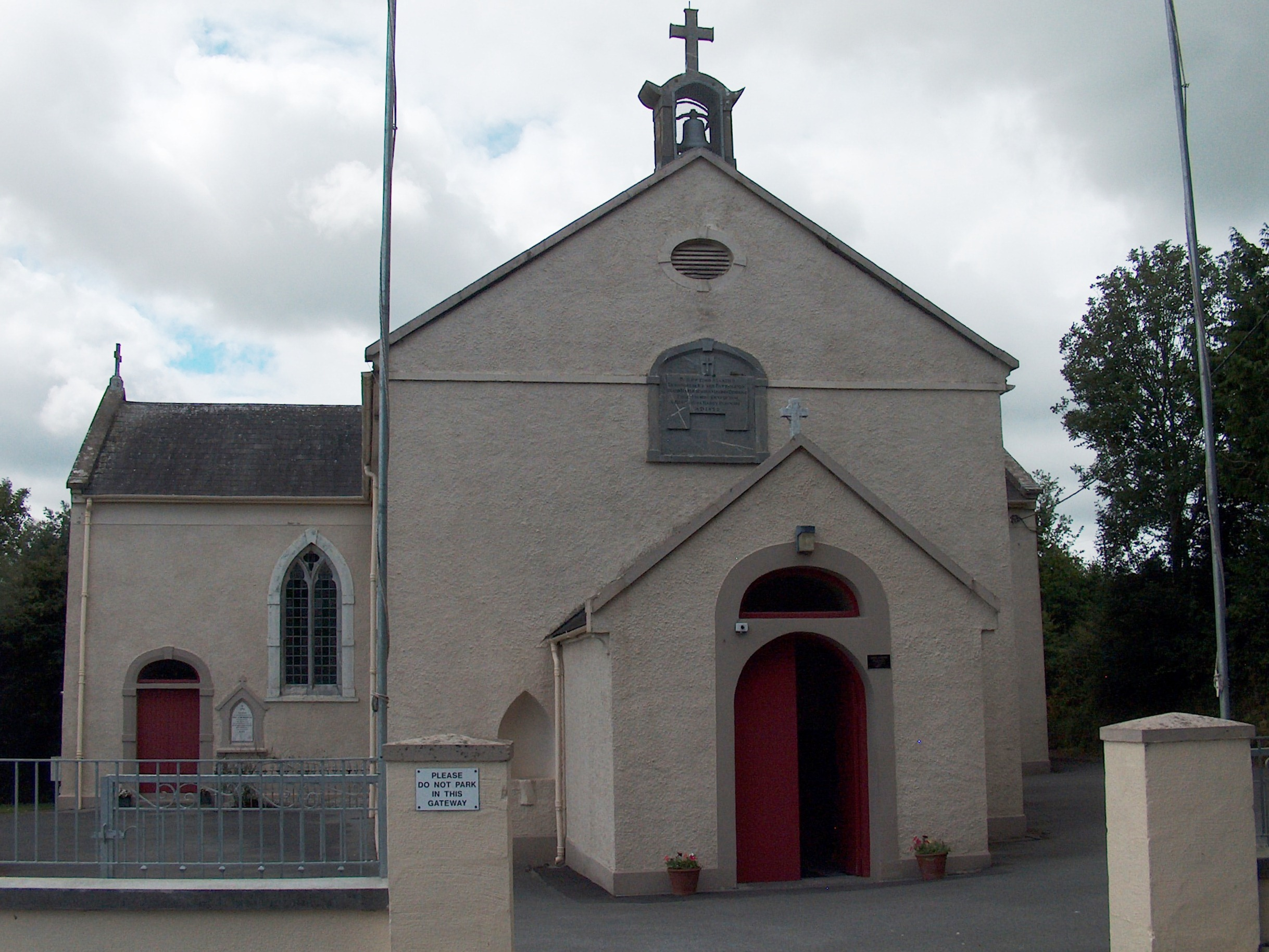
- Ballygarvan church

- Location in Ireland
- Coordinates: 51°50′N 8°28′W
- Country: Ireland
- Province: Munster
- County: County Cork

Population (2022)
  - Total: 556
- Time zone: UTC+0 (WET)
  - Summer (DST): UTC-1 (IST (WEST))

Ballygarvan (Irish: Baile Garbháin) is a village in County Cork, Ireland. It lies 9 km south of Cork City. The village had a population of 556 inhabitants as of the 2022 census.

== Location ==
Occupying the eastern half of Ballinhassig parish, the village lies in the valley between Myrtle Hill and Meadstown Hill, beside the River Owenabue. The village is just off the Cork–Kinsale road with Cork City 9 km to the north. Cork Airport is located 2 km away in the Farmers Cross area.

== Amenities and sport ==
Facilities in Ballygarvan include a Catholic church, a primary school, a public house, a hairdresser and a creche. In 1921, the village school was burned down by British forces following an Irish Republican Army (IRA) ambush in nearby Ballinhassig.

The village also has a Gaelic Athletic Association (GAA) club and playing pitch. The GAA club, Ballygarvan GAA, won the Cork Junior A Hurling Championship in 2004.

== Notable people ==
- Emer Dillon, Cork camogie player
- Liam MacCarthy, GAA patron after whom the Liam MacCarthy Cup is named
- Ger Spillane, Cork Gaelic footballer
- Stephen White, Cork hurler

== See also ==
- List of towns and villages in Ireland
