= Liam MacCarthy =

Irish nationalist and businessman (1853–1928)

Liam MacCarthy (1853–1928) was an Irish nationalist, businessman and activist in London; best known for his donation to the Gaelic Athletic Association of a trophy for the All-Ireland Senior Hurling Championship, which is called the Liam MacCarthy Cup in his honour.

== Personal life ==
MacCarthy was born in Southwark, London to Catholic Irish parents who had emigrated from Ballygarvan, County Cork. His father Eoghan MacCarthy was nicknamed Capall, Irish for 'horse' because of his great strength. Liam MacCarthy grew up in a close-knit Irish community; he played hurling on Clapham Common and Irish was the first language in the family home. After leaving school he worked as a blacksmith's hammerman and as a railwayman. In 1875, at age 22, he married Alice Padbury in St George's Cathedral, Southwark. The couple had four sons. His wife's family owned a fancy box factory and MacCarthy joined the family business but a few years later he struck out on his own setting up a fancy box making factory in the family home. After some years he set up a factory in Peckham which he called St. Brigid's works. He died on 28 September 1928 and was buried at Camberwell Old Cemetery in London.

== GAA ==
He was also elected chairman of London GAA county board, a position he held for 10 years. Michael Collins and Sam Maguire were also members of the London county board. In conjunction with two of his sons, Liam MacCarthy commissioned the manufacture of a trophy in the form of a mether, an ancient Irish drinking cup. This cup was offered to the GAA central council in Croke Park and was gratefully accepted. It is awarded annually and in perpetuity to the winners of the All-Ireland Senior Hurling Championship.

Ballygarvan GAA's ground is called Páirc Liam Mhic Cárthaigh "Liam MacCarthy Park".

== Politics ==
MacCarthy became a leader in London's Irish community and was elected to the council of the Metropolitan Borough of Camberwell in the North Pechkam ward. Despite his advanced years he joined the London branch of the Irish Volunteers along with his sons. He was also a member of the Irish Republican Brotherhood. In 1915, Britain introduced conscription; a crisis meeting of the London branch of the Irish volunteers was held at his home in east Dulwich to discuss the issue. As a councillor, MacCarthy could not publicly advise men to avoid conscription but in response to questions from Michael Collins he said, "If you come from Clonakilty it is obvious where you must go" - in other words advising them to return to Ireland where conscription was not in force.
