= Seán Brady (Gaelic footballer) =

Irish Gaelic footballer

Personal information
- Native name: Seán Ó Brádaigh (Irish)
- Born: 2003 (age 22–23) Ballygarvan, County Cork, Ireland
- Occupation: Student

Sport
- Sport: Gaelic football
- Position: Centre-back
Club
- Years: Club
- 2021-present: Ballygarvan
Club titles
- Cork titles: 0
College
- Years: College
- 2022-present: MTU Cork
College titles
- Sigerson titles: 0
Inter-county
- Years: County
- 2025-: Cork
Inter-county titles
- Munster titles: 0
- All-Irelands: 0
- NFL: 0
- All Stars: 0

Seán Brady (born 2003) is an Irish Gaelic footballer. At club level, he plays with Ballygarvan and at inter-county level with the Cork senior football team.

== Career ==
Brady played Gaelic football and hurling at all grades as a student at St Francis College in Rochestown. He progressed through the various competitions and won an All-Ireland PPS SBHC title in 2022 after a 0–17 to 0–09 win over Coláiste Bhaile Chláir in the final. Brady later lined out with MTU Cork in the Sigerson Cup.

At club level, Brady first played for Ballygarvan as a dual player at juvenile and underage levels, before progressing to adult level. He won consecutive South East JAFC titles in 2023 and 2024.

Brady first played for Cork at inter-county level as a member of the minor team in 2020. He subsequently progressed to the under-20 team. Brady made his senior team debut in 2025.

== Honours ==
St Francis College

- All-Ireland PPS Senior B Hurling Championship: 2022
- Munster PPS Senior B Hurling Championship: 2022

Ballygarvan

- South East Junior A Football Championship: 2023, 2024
