= Ger Spillane =

Irish Gaelic footballer

Personal information
- Native name: Gearóid Ó Spealáin (Irish)
- Born: 3 March 1981 (age 45) Ballygarvan, County Cork
- Occupation: Farm sales representative
- Height: 6 ft 1 in (185 cm)

Sport
- Sport: Gaelic football
- Position: Half-back
Club
- Years: Club
- 1999–present: Ballygarvan
Club titles
- Cork titles: 0
Inter-county
- Years: County
- 2006–2012: Cork
Inter-county titles
- Munster titles: 3
- All-Irelands: 1
- NFL: 2 (Div 1) 1(Div 2)
- All Stars: 1

Ger Spillane (born 3 March 1981 in Ballygarvan, County Cork) is a member of the Cork inter-county Gaelic football team and is one of the Vodafone GAA All Stars for the 2006 season. In 2007, he was part of the Cork side that reached the final of the All-Ireland Senior Football Championship to be beaten by Kerry in the final. In 2008, he was again part of the Cork team that lost to Kerry after a replay in a semi-final. Cork also lost to Kerry in the 2009 All-Ireland final but Ger finally won an All-Ireland Senior Football title in 2010 when Cork beat Co Down in the All-Ireland final. As a hurler, Spillane played a leading role in Ballygarvan winning the Cork Junior Hurling Championship title in 2004. He also played a leading role in Ballygarvan reaching the final of the 2010 Cork Intermediate Hurling Championship.
