= Lorcan Mulvey =

Cavan and London Gaelic footballer

Lorcan Mulvey is a Gaelic footballer. He has played club football for Butlersbridge and also played for the Cavan county team at all levels. He played for the Cavan senior team for eight years until 2010. Since moving to London he has transferred to Fulham Irish and played for the London county team.

On 26 May 2013, he scored the vital goal that gave London a 1-12 - 0-14 victory over Sligo - their first victory in the competition since 1977. He was later nominated for an All Star, but was not selected.

His uncle Joe Guckian played for Leitrim during the 1970s and 1980s. He supported Leitrim as a boy and attended the county's successful 1994 Connacht final. His uncle Tom Guckian is a member of the County Leitrim CCC and is the Chairperson of the Páirc Seán committee.
