= Stephen White (hurler) =

Irish hurler

Personal information
- Native name: Stiofán de Faoite (Irish)
- Born: 14 October 1988 (age 38) Ballygarvan, County Cork, Ireland
- Occupation: MCO analyst with EMC
- Height: 5 ft 11 in (180 cm)

Sport
- Sport: Hurling
- Position: Midfield
Club
- Years: Club
- Ballygarvan
Club titles
	Football	Hurling
Cork titles	0	0
College
- Years: College
- Cork Institute of Technology
College titles
- Fitzgibbon titles: 0
Inter-county*
Years	County	Apps (scores)
2008-2014	Cork	3 (0-00)
Inter-county titles
- Munster titles: 0
- All-Irelands: 0
- NHL: 0
- All Stars: 0
- *Inter County team apps and scores correct as of 11:57, 14 August 2013.

Stephen White (born 14 October 1988) is an Irish hurler who played as a midfielder for the Cork senior team.

Born in Ballygarvan, County Cork, White first played competitive hurling in his younger days. He arrived on the inter-county scene at the age of sixteen when he first linked up with the Cork minor team, before later lining out with the under-21 and intermediate sides. He made his senior debut in the 2008 National Hurling League. White has since gone on to be a regular member of the team, however, he has yet to claim any silverware.

At club level White is a Munster medallist in the junior grade with Ballygarvan. He has also won a junior championship medal with the club.

== Playing career ==
=== Club ===
White plays his club hurling and Gaelic football with Ballygarvan and has enjoyed much success.

In 2004 White was only fifteen years-old when he started playing with the club's top team. A 3–7 to 1–12 defeat of Grenagh gave him a junior championship medal. Ballygravan later claimed the provincial crown, with White collecting a Munster medal following a 0–16 to 1–5 defeat of Tramore.

=== Inter-county ===
White joined the Cork minor hurling team in 2005 and made his championship debut when he came on as a substitute in a 4–28 to 0-1 trouncing of Kerry in the Munster quarter-final. He later collected his first Munster medal following a 2–18 to 1–12 defeat of Limerick.

White was eligible for the minor grade again in 2006. A 2–20 to 1–15 defeat of Tipperary gave him a second Munster medal on the field of play.

In 2007 White made his Cork under-21 debut. On 1 August 2007 he won a Munster medal in this grade following a 1–20 to 0-10 trouncing of Waterford.

White made his senior debut with Cork during the 2008 National Hurling League, while he also linked up with the Cork intermediate hurling team.

After a number of years off the team, White returned to the Cork senior team in 2013. On 14 July 2013 White made his senior championship debut when he came on as a substitute in the Munster decider. Cork faced a 0–24 to 0–15 defeat by Limerick on that occasion. On 8 September 2013 White came on as a substitute in the All-Ireland decider against Clare. Three second-half goals through Conor Lehane, Anthony Nash and Pa Cronin, and a tenth point of the game from Patrick Horgan gave Cork a one-point lead as injury time came to an end. A last-gasp point from corner-back Domhnall O'Donovan earned Clare a 0–25 to 3–16 draw and a replay on 28 September.

On 3 April 2014 it was announced that White had been unfairly dropped from Cork's championship panel.

== Honours ==
=== Team ===
Ballygarvan

- Munster Junior Club Hurling Championship (1): 2004
- Cork Junior Hurling Championship (1): 2004

Cork

- Munster Under-21 Hurling Championship (1): 2008
- Munster Minor Hurling Championship (2): 2005, 2006
