= London Senior Football Championship =

Annual Gaelic football competition

- Irish: Craobh Sinsear Peile Londain
- Code: Gaelic football
- Founded: 1897; 129 years ago
- Region: London (GAA)
- No. of teams: 8
- Title holders: Fulham Irish (5th title)
- Most titles: Tír Chonaill Gaels (18 titles)
- Official website: London GAA

The London Senior Football Championship (currently known as the Barhale Senior Football Championship for sponsorship reasons) is the Gaelic football county championship competition in London. Organised by the London County Board of the Gaelic Athletic Association, the championship has been contested since 1897, with Ireland United winning the first title. The current champions are Fulham Irish, who beat St Kiernan's in the 2026 final.

== Teams ==
There will be 8 teams competing in the 2026 Senior Championship:

Club name	Location
Dulwich Harps	Dulwich
Fulham Irish	Fulham
North London Shamrocks	Palmers Green
Round Towers	Mitcham
St Kiernans	Chipping Barnet
Tara	Greenford
Tir Chonaill Gaels	Greenford
Wandsworth Gaels	Barn Elms

== Roll of honour ==
=== Wins by year ===
- 1897 Ireland United
- 1898 Hibernians
- 1899 Hibernians
- 1900 Robert Emmets
- 1901 Hibernians
- 1902 Hibernians
- 1903 Hibernians
- 1904 Hibernians
- 1905 Milesians
- 1906 Milesians
- 1907 Hibernians
- 1908 William Rooneys
- 1909 Hibernians
- 1910 Hibernians
- 1911 Hibernians
- 1912 William Rooneys
- 1913 William Rooneys
- 1914 William Rooneys
- 1915 Geraldines
- 1916 no championship
- 1917 no championship
- 1918 no championship
- 1919 no championship
- 1920 no championship
- 1921 Brothers Pearse
- 1922 Fintan Lalors
- 1923 Rory O'Connors
- 1924 Fintan Lalors
- 1925 no championship
- 1926 St Patricks
- 1927 Brothers Pearse
- 1928 Shamrocks
- 1929 St Patricks
- 1930 St Patricks
- 1931 Shamrocks
- 1932 Shamrocks
- 1933 Round Towers
- 1934 Thomas McCurtains
- 1935 Thomas McCurtains
- 1936 Fintan Lalors
- 1937 Fintan Lalors
- 1938 Brothers Pearse
- 1939 Granuaille
- 1940 Round Towers
- 1941 Shamrocks/Tara
- 1942 Shamrocks/Tara
- 1943 Cú Chulainns
- 1944 Cú Chulainns
- 1945 Tara
- 1946 St Patricks
- 1947 Tara
- 1948 St Josephs
- 1949 Naomh Mhuire
- 1950 Naomh Mhuire
- 1951 Tara
- 1952 Cú Chulainns
- 1953 St Vincents
- 1954 St Vincents
- 1955 Naomh Mhuire
- 1956 Garryowen
- 1957 Shamrocks
- 1958 Garryowen
- 1959 Shamrocks
- 1960 St Monicas
- 1961 St Vincents
- 1962 Parnells
- 1963 Naomh Mhuire
- 1964 Round Towers
- 1965 Round Towers
- 1966 Parnells
- 1967 unknown
- 1968 Naomh Mhuire
- 1969 Garryowen
- 1970 Sean Treacys
- 1971 Parnells
- 1972 Garryowen
- 1973 Kingdom
- 1974 Kingdom
- 1975 Kingdom
- 1976 Kingdom
- 1977 Kingdom
- 1978 Kingdom
- 1979 Parnells
- 1980 Garryowen
- 1981 Parnells
- 1982 Round Towers
- 1983 Tír Chonaill Gaels
- 1984 Moindearg
- 1985 Kingdom
- 1986 Kingdom
- 1987 Kingdom
- 1988 Parnells
- 1989 Kingdom
- 1990 Tír Chonaill Gaels
- 1991 Parnells
- 1992 Tír Chonaill Gaels
- 1993 Tír Chonaill Gaels
- 1994 St Brendans
- 1995 Tara
- 1996 Tír Chonaill Gaels
- 1997 Tír Chonaill Gaels
- 1998 Tír Chonaill Gaels
- 1999 Neasden Gaels
- 2000 Tír Chonaill Gaels
- 2001 Tír Chonaill Gaels
- 2002 St Brendans
- 2003 Tara
- 2004 Kingdom Kerry Gaels
- 2005 Tír Chonaill Gaels
- 2006 St Brendans
- 2007 Tír Chonaill Gaels
- 2008 Tír Chonaill Gaels
- 2009 Tír Chonaill Gaels
- 2010 Neasden Gaels
- 2011 Fulham Irish
- 2012 Tír Chonaill Gaels
- 2013 Kingdom Kerry Gaels
- 2014 Tír Chonaill Gaels
- 2015 Tír Chonaill Gaels
- 2016 St Kiernans
- 2017 Fulham Irish
- 2018 Tír Chonaill Gaels
- 2019 Tír Chonaill Gaels
- 2020 Fulham Irish
- 2021 St Kiernans
- 2022 St Kiernans
- 2023 Fulham Irish
- 2024 North London Shamrocks
- 2025 North London Shamrocks
- 2026 Fulham Irish

=== Wins by club ===
#	Club	Championship wins	Years won
1	Tir Chonaill Gaels	18	1983, 1990, 1992, 1993, 1996, 1997, 1998, 2000, 2001, 2005, 2007, 2008, 2009, 2012, 2014, 2015, 2018, 2019
2	Kingdom/Kingdom Kerry Gaels	12	1973, 1974, 1975, 1976, 1977, 1978, 1985, 1986, 1987, 1989, 2004, 2013
3	Hibernians	10	1898, 1899, 1901, 1902, 1903, 1904, 1907, 1909, 1910, 1911
4	Shamrocks	7	1928, 1931, 1932, 1941, 1942, 1957, 1959
4	Parnells	7	1962, 1966, 1971, 1979, 1981, 1988, 1991
6	Tara	6	1941, 1942, 1947, 1951, 1995, 2003
6	Garryowen	6	1956, 1958, 1969, 1972, 1980,
7	Naomh Mhuire	5	1949, 1950, 1955, 1963, 1968
7	Round Towers	5	1933, 1940, 1964, 1965, 1982
7	Fulham Irish	5	2011, 2017, 2020, 2023, 2026
9	William Rooneys	4	1908, 1912, 1913, 1914
9	Fintan Lalors	4	1922, 1924, 1936, 1937
9	St Patrick's	4	1926, 1929, 1930, 1946
14	Brothers Pearse	3	1921, 1927, 1938
14	Cú Chulainns	3	1943, 1944, 1952
14	St Vincent's	3	1953, 1954, 1961
14	St Brendans	3	1994, 2002, 2006
14	St Kiernans	3	2016, 2021, 2022
19	Milesians	2	1905, 1906
19	Thomas McCurtains	2	1934, 1935
19	Neasden Gaels	2	1999, 2010
19	North London Shamrocks	2	2024, 2025
23	Ireland United	1	1897
23	Robert Emmets	1	1900
23	Geraldines	1	1915
23	Rory O'Connors	1	1923
23	Granuaile	1	1939
23	St Josephs	1	1948
23	St Monica's	1	1960
23	Seán Treacys	1	1970
23	Moindearg	1	1984

== Finals listed by year ==
† indicates a team that is now defunct.

(rep) indicates a game won via a replay

(aw) indicates a game where the losing side on paper was awarded the victory

Year	Winner	Score		Opponent	Source
2026	Fulham Irish	1-10	1-08	St Kiernans	
2025	North London Shamrocks	3-07	0-13	Tir Chonaill Gaels	
2024	North London Shamrocks	1-11	1-08	St Kiernans	
2023	Fulham Irish	0-11	0-08	Tir Chonaill Gaels	
2022	St Kiernans	0-13 (rep)	0-08	Fulham Irish	
2021	St Kiernans	1-13	0-12	Fulham Irish	
2020	Fulham Irish	2-17	0-16	Tir Chonaill Gaels	
2019	Tir Chonaill Gaels	1-11	1-10	Fulham Irish	
2018	Tir Chonaill Gaels	0-15 (rep)	0-13	Fulham Irish	
2017	Fulham Irish	0-15	1-11	Tir Chonaill Gaels	
2016	St Kiernans	0-13	0-05	Tir Chonaill Gaels	
2015	Tir Chonaill Gaels	3-10	1-13	St Kiernans	
2014	Tir Chonaill Gaels	1-12	1-09	Fulham Irish	
2013	Kingdom Kerry Gaels	1-07	0-09	Tir Chonaill Gaels	
2012	Tir Chonaill Gaels	1-15	1-08	Kingdom Kerry Gaels	
2011	Fulham Irish	1-08	0-07	Parnells	
2010	Neasden Gaels	1-07	0-07	Parnells	
2009	Tir Chonaill Gaels	1-09 (rep)	0-07	Neasden Gaels†	
2008	Tir Chonaill Gaels	0-07	0-06	Neasden Gaels†	
2007	Tir Chonaill Gaels	1-19	0-04	Kingdom Kerry Gaels	
2006	St Brendans			Tara	
2005	Tir Chonaill Gaels	0-10	0-03	St Brendans	
2004	Kingdom Kerry Gaels	2-06	0-04	Tara	
2003	Tara	0-14	0-08	Kingdom Kerry Gaels	
2002	St Brendans	2-11	0-10	St Clarets	
2001	Tir Chonaill Gaels	1-10 (rep)	0-09	St Brendans	
2000	Tir Chonaill Gaels	0-13	0-07	Kingdom	
1999	Neasden Gaels†	1-10	0-12	Round Towers	
1998	Tir Chonaill Gaels	0-06 (aw)	0-13	Garryowen	
1997	Tir Chonaill Gaels	0-013	0-10	St Brendans	
1996	Tir Chonaill Gaels	2-15	1-08	Kingdom	
1995	Tara	1-06 (rep)	0-08	Naomh Mhuire†	
1994	St Brendans	1-09	1-06	Tara	
1993	Tir Chonaill Gaels	0-09	0-05	St Brendans	
1992	Tir Chonaill Gaels	2-09	1-01	Parnells	
1991	Parnells	0-11	1-04	Garryowen	
1990	Tir Chonaill Gaels	2-14	2-04	St Brendans	
1989	Kingdom			Garryowen	
1988	Parnells	2-05	0-07	Garryowen	
1987	Kingdom	2-06	0-07	Round Towers	
1986	Kingdom	6-12	2-04	Geraldines†	
1985	Kingdom	2-13	1-07	Moindearg†	
1984	Moindearg†				
1983	Tir Chonaill Gaels	1-06	0-07	Round Towers	
1982	Round Towers	0-06	0-05	Kingdom	
1981	Parnells	0-12	0-04	Round Towers	
1980	Garryowen	1-12	1-08	Parnells	
1979	Parnells				
1978	Kingdom	2-09	1-10	Parnells	
1977	Kingdom	3-08	2-04	Tara	
1976	Kingdom	2-10	1-07	Parnells	
1975	Kingdom				
1974	Kingdom	0-14	1-06	Round Towers	
1973	Kingdom	5-10	2-04	South O'Hanlon†	
1972	Garryowen	3-05	2-07	Kingdom	
1971	Parnells	3-08	0-09	Seán Treacys	
1970	Seán Treacys			Kingdom	
1969	Garryowen	2-07	0-11	Parnells	
1968	Naomh Mhuire†	1-07	0-04	Garryowen	
1967					
1966	Parnells			Kingdom	
