= North London Shamrocks =

Gaelic football club in London

- Seamróga Londain Thuaidh
- Founded: 2005
- County: London
- Colours: Blue, Green, White
- Grounds: Tottenhall Recreation Ground
- Coordinates: 51°36′39″N 0°05′43″W

Playing kits
Standard colours

Senior Club Championships
	All Ireland	Great Britain champions	London champions
Football:	-	-	2

North London Shamrocks Gaelic Football Club is a Gaelic football and ladies' Gaelic football club based in the London Borough of Enfield.

== History ==
The club was founded in 2005 as an amalgamation of St Theresa's (Ponders End and Shannon Rovers) and Sam Maguires (Wood Green). The club is based at Tottenhall Sports Ground in Palmers Green. Shamrocks won the London Intermediate Football Championship in 2014. Many of their players are from County Donegal.

The club won a first London Senior Football Championship title in 2024, defeating St Kiernan's in the final. The club's goalkeeper for that win was former Laois player Graham Brody. Their manager is All-Ireland SFC winner Peter Witherow.

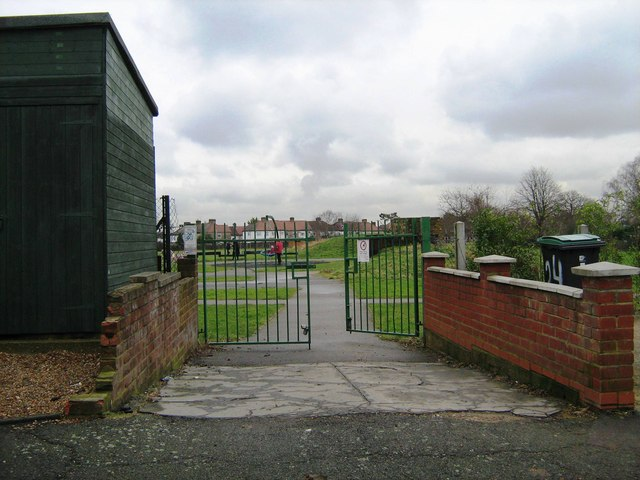
Entrance to Tottenhall Sports Ground

== Honours ==
- London Senior Football Championship (2): 2024, 2025
- London Intermediate Football Championship (1): 2014
