= Neasden Gaels =

- Gaeil Neasden
- Founded: 1989
- County: London
- Nickname: The Neasden
- Colours: Black & Amber
- Grounds: Silver Jubilee Park, Townsend Lane, Kingsbury, North West London NW9 7NE.

Playing kits
Standard colours

Senior Club Championships
	All Ireland	British champions	London champions
Football:	-	-	2

Neasden Gaels GFC were a Gaelic Football team are based in Kingsbury, North London. Neasden Gaels were founded into the junior ranks of London GAA in February 1989 following a meeting between officials at McDonagh's Bar in Kingsbury, North West London. The founder members were Michael Cleary (Manchester), Roger O'Connor (Sligo), Jim Devine (Longford), Bobby Moynihan (Kerry), Claire Moynihan (London) and, of course, Danny O'Sullivan who hails from Killorglin in Kerry and Michael McDonagh, proprietor of McDonagh's Bar, Kingsbury and a native of Galway who was also appointed as Neasden's first team manager.

Neasden Gaels had grown into a senior side by winning the London Intermediate Football Championship in 1996 and then winning the London Senior Football Championship in 1999 an unprecedented 10 years after the club's foundation. Neasden Gaels were one of the highest ranked Gaelic Football teams in Britain and contested the 2008 London Senior Football final and London Senior Football final and were last London Senior Football champions in 2010. Neasden Gaels GFC came close to being the first ever London club team to progress to an All Ireland Club Senior semi final in 2011 with an All Ireland Quarter final defeat against title and eventual All Ireland champions Crossmaglen Rangers.

Due to falling numbers of players emigrating to London and lack of underage structures, Neasden Gaels did not field a senior men's team and officially disbanded as a club in 2024.

== Notable players ==
- Scott Doran

== See also ==
- Gaelic Athletic Association
- London Senior Football Roll of Honour on Wikipedia
