= Kingdom Kerry Gaels =

- Founded: 1959
- County: London
- Nickname: KKG
- Colours: Green & gold
- Grounds: Finchley Rugby Club, Summers Lane, N12 0PD

Playing kits
Standard colours

Senior Club Championships
	All Ireland	British champions	London champions
Football:	0	11	11
Ladies' football:	0	2	2

The Kingdom Kerry Gaels GFC are a Gaelic football club based in Finchley in North London. The club was formed in 1959 and are one of the most successful clubs in London GAA. The club currently has both a men's team and a ladies team that compete in their respective London Senior championships

== History ==
=== Men's Team ===
Kingdom GAA club London was founded in 1959 by Michael Walsh, Josie O'Connell, Bill Cremins, Sean and Brendan Kerrisk and Jerome Spillane (uncle of Pat Spillane).

Fielding a junior team in its first year Kingdom won promotion to Intermediate and got promoted to senior in 1963. Kingdom reached its first senior final in 1966 where they were beaten by Parnells by one point.

Three more finals were lost before the Golden Era of the 70's when Kingdom won 6 senior championships in a row (1973–1978), a feat which was never achieved by any other club before or since. 6 British championships and 2 All-Ireland 7-a-side championships were also secured during this period. Kingdom are the only club from across the water to win two Irish championships on Irish soil.

Emigration slowed down and Kingdom found it hard to field an all Kerry team and the club started to recruit players from all corners of Ireland. Tom Roche, who played in the '66 final and was a member of the 6-in-a-row teams, was appointed manager. In his first year in charge Kingdom won the senior league and Conway Cup and were beaten in the 1982 Senior championship final by Round Towers by a point.

However the club were on the right track and 4 London senior championships followed ('85, '86, '87 and '89), including a 3-in-a-row and 4 British championships were subsequently won during the 80's.

In the 80's Eddie Sheehan and Frank Shanley formed Kerry Gaels GAA underage club and they too had an extremely successful period. The underage teams won all before them in age groups from u12's, u14's, u16's and up to minor level, including a 3-in-a-row in the London championship at that grade. They also won 2 British championships at U14 (1996) and U16 (1998). Phil Lynch was notoriously known as the best player and almost won them the competition on his own with his exception performance.

Kerry Gaels then formed a junior club on the back of their successful underage structure and success soon followed. By the early 90s the club had won their way up to senior level where they won 2 London Senior league titles. Indeed in 1997 Kerry Gaels and Kingdom met in a senior championship semi-final which Kingdom won by a point after a replay.

However owing to the boom of the Celtic Tiger both clubs soon found that many of their players returned to their native counties. Many meetings and discussions were held and in 1999 it was decided that the best way forward was to amalgamate the two clubs and form a much stronger position in the London GAA scene under the name Kingdom Kerry Gaels.

The club initially struggled to find its footing and after losing the championship final in 2000 to Tir Chonaill Gaels, 2001 was a very lean year as a lot of the players from the successful underage teams tried to make the step up to the senior grade.

However Kingdom Kerry Gaels won their first major trophy as an amalgamated club when they defeated Garryowen in the 2002 senior league final after a replay.

In Feb 2003, Kingdom Kerry Gaels won the Paidi O'Se tournament beating Edenderry (Offaly), An Gaeltacht (Kerry) and Na Piarsaigh (Cork) in the final.

They then reached their first senior championship final in 2003 which they lost to Tara. In 2004 however the club achieved its greatest moment, and gained revenge on Tara, by winning their first senior championship trophy under the name Kingdom Kerry Gaels, 2–6 to 0–4

Following on from that championship success Kingdom Kerry Gaels represented London at the All-Ireland quarter final stage where they met Crossmaglen Rangers, a club which had won two All-Ireland Senior Club Football Championship titles in 1999 and 2000 and were littered with a number of players from the 2002 All-Ireland winning Armagh team. After an epic encounter in which Kingdom Kerry Gaels pulled back a 6-point deficit to just 1 point with 10 minutes remaining, Crossmaglen's greater big match experience and know-how came to the fore and they defeated Kingdom Kerry Gaels by 4 points in the end, 2–10 to 1–9.

One more London senior championship final has since been reached where Kingdom Kerry Gaels were defeated by Tir Chonaill Gaels in the 2007 final.

=== Ladies Team ===
KKG Ladies was founded in the late 1990s, originally as part of the Kerry Gaels men's club which then merged with The Kingdom in 1999 to form Kingdom Kerry Gaels (KKG).

KKG Ladies competed at junior level in London in the early years before seeing success in 2002 and 2003 when winning back to back London junior championship titles. The club went on to reach the All-Britain junior provincial championship final in those two years also, losing out to Emerald Gaels of Manchester on both occasions, before moving up to senior grade in London in 2004.

After 5 years competing in the senior grade and the team in transition with a number of new players, the Ladies team felt it would be beneficial to their side to step down to junior grade and regroup at that level.

Subsequently 2009 saw the club's most successful year to date. Playing at junior grade in London, KKG Ladies won the London junior championship and Tom O'Connor Cup before defeating John Mitchells of Birmingham to win the All-Britain junior provincial title for the first time in the club's history. Subsequently the club lost the All-Ireland Junior Quarter final to Monaghan club Corduff (who were managed by the then Monaghan manager Séamus McEnaney) on a scoreline of 2–3 to 4–9. However the team then went on to win its fourth trophy in 2009 winning the London league title – another first in the club's history – and beating a number of London senior clubs along the way.

In 2010 KKG Ladies returned to the senior ranks in London and reached their first ever senior county final, unfortunate on the day to lose to Parnells.

== Achievements ==
- London Senior Football Championship Roll of Honour 2013
