= McGovern Park =

Gaelic games ground in England

- Páirc Mhic Shamhráin
- Location within Greater London
- Location: West End Road, South Ruislip, London HA4 6QX, England
- Coordinates: 51°33′01″N 0°23′54″W
- Public transit: South Ruislip
- Owner: London GAA
- Operator: London GAA
- Capacity: 3,000 (1,950 seated)
- Surface: FieldTurf

Construction
- Renovated: 2017

McGovern Park (formerly known as Emerald GAA Grounds) is the current headquarters, and principal Gaelic games facility, of the London GAA. It is situated in South Ruislip, west London.

The stadium is the current venue for the finals of the London football and hurling championships, and the Nicky Rackard Cup (Level 2A), as well as British inter-provincial titles among Warwickshire, Gloucestershire, Scotland, Hertfordshire, Yorkshire and Lancashire.

== History ==
In 1999, the original grounds did not have any scoreboard, and dugouts were situated off the opposite ends of the pitch. The pitch itself was sponsored by Bank of Ireland, and featured their crest. Since then, a modern electronic scoreboard has been added, and dugouts have been refurnished. The ground bar has full sports coverage, including Setanta for Live GAA. In 2016, the stadium was closed while a new stand was built, at a cost of £4.17m. On 28 May 2017, the stadium was reopened, with the name changed from Emerald GAA Grounds to McGovern Park. It is named after local businessman Tony McGovern, who helped fund the redevelopment.

=== London GAA ===
The Pitch is the home ground of the London hurling team, hosting the Christy Ring Cup, and the NHL. The grounds is also the home of the London Football Team, and their Allianz NFL matches are held there. The female teams play in the Brendan Martin Cup (the ladies senior football cup), and the O'Duffy Cup (camogie).

=== Railway Cup Final 2009 ===
Final Score: Munster 1-08 ---- 0–15 Ulster

On the 125th anniversary of the GAA, it was decided that the Railway Cup final of 2009 would be held in England. GAA president Christy Cooney said that this was because of England's Gaelic Development:

"It's one way of acknowledging and supporting the games in Britain by having such a high profile final here with the quality players that we have.

"Secondly Britain were keen to organise a celebration for the 125th year. We’re thrilled to be staging the final here and the players will be thrilled to come and play here."

There was, on the night before the match, a gala ceremony, with tickets costing £50. The Irish ambassador to United Kingdom was there, with numerous other Irish diplomatic and Gaelic games players present. The game was held the next day, with Ulster narrowly winning by three points, which upset predictions that Munster would win.

=== Pandemic ===
During the COVID-19 pandemic in London, McGovern Park went six months without a competitive game, as did the entire UK, with Ruislip hosting a hurling match to resume in September 2020.

=== Other ===
The GAA holds annual refereeing courses and fitness tests in the grounds. Recently, Irish rock band Bagatelle played a music festival at the clubhouse. The clubhouse hosts numerous charity events on behalf of Hillingdon.

== Facilities ==
The grounds features a 1,950-seat stand, a renovated clubhouse, with complete changing rooms and toilets for the home and away teams respectively. There is a balcony for trophy presentations and speeches, and a large scoreboard. The grounds features special function rooms for hire. The ground floor houses a bar and dressing room, whilst the first floor holds a multi-function room. Two full size car parks are also available. The Irish national Anthem, Amhrán na bhFiann, is played through speakers surrounding the grounds. The pitch is not floodlit, meaning most games are played in the afternoon.

== See also ==
- List of Gaelic Athletic Association stadiums
