= Ballygarvan GAA =

Gaelic games club in County Cork, Ireland

Ballygarvan
- Baile Garbháin
- Founded: 1863
- County: Cork
- Colours: Red and White
- Grounds: Páirc Liam Mhic Cárthaigh
- Coordinates: 51°49′27.89″N 8°27′22.77″W

Playing kits
Standard colours

Ballygarvan GAA is a Gaelic Athletic Association club based in the village of Ballygarvan, County Cork, Ireland. The club fields teams in hurling, Gaelic football and camogie. The club plays in the Carrigdhoun division of Cork GAA.

== History ==
The earliest reference to Ballygarvan National Hurling Club occurs in 1828 in an account of the South Cork Hurling Championship. The club won the county senior championship title, defeating Bartlemey in 1879, in a competition predating the formation of the Gaelic Athletic Association in 1884. The Ballygarvan club was a founding-member of the Cork County Board in December 1886 and was involved in its activities in the association's formative years. The club contested, without success, the county finals of 1888 and 1896.

The establishment of the Divisional Boards in 1924 led to the Ballygarvan club participating in the various Carrigdhoun-controlled competitions. During the Emergency (WWII), a new parish team under the name Owenabue Rovers emerged. Between 1946 and 1980, the club participated in South-East divisional competitions as St Garvan's.

Gaelic football had a chequered history within the club with intermittent surges of interest in the 1930s and 1960s. It was not until the 1970s that teams competed with regularity in the various competitions. Since the turn of the 21st century, the club has won 9 divisional championship titles, seven in football and two in hurling.

On 19 September 2010, Ger Spillane became the first Ballygarvan club player to win an All-Ireland medal at senior level. He was a member of the Cork senior football team that defeated Down by 0–16 to 0–15 in the All-Ireland final.

== Grounds ==
Páirc Liam Mhic Cárthaigh in Ballygarvan was officially opened on 22 April 1984. The grounds are named in honour of Liam MacCarthy whose father, Eoghan, had emigrated to London from Ballygarvan in 1851.

== Honours ==
- Cork Junior Hurling Championship (1): 2004
- Munster Junior Club Hurling Championship (1): 2004
- South East Junior A Hurling Championship (2): 1977, 2004
- South East Junior A Football Championship (7): 2002, 2003, 2008, 2009, 2014, 2023, 2024, 2025

== Notable players ==
The following players represented Cork senior inter-county championship teams:

- Emer Dillon - Cork camogie
- Seán Brady - Gaelic footballer
- Aodán Mac Gearailt - Kerry footballer
- Ger Spillane - senior football
- Stephen White - senior hurling
