= London county football team =

Gaelic football team representing County London

London
- Sport: Football
- Irish: Londain
- Nickname(s): The Exiles
- County board: London GAA
- Manager: Michael Maher
- Captain: Liam Gallagher
- Home venue(s): McGovern Park

Recent competitive record
- Last championship title: None
- Current NFL Division: 4 (7th in 2025)
- Last league title: None
First colours	Second colours

The London county football team represents London in men's Gaelic football and is governed by London GAA, the county board of the Gaelic Athletic Association. The team competes in the three major annual inter-county competitions; the All-Ireland Senior Football Championship, the Connacht Senior Football Championship and the National Football League.

London's home ground is McGovern Park, South Ruislip. The team's manager is Michael Maher.

London reached the Connacht Senior Championship final in 2013, but has never won the All-Ireland Senior Championship nor the National League.

== History ==
The team participated in the All-Ireland Senior Football Championship (SFC) between 1900 and 1910. They hosted Louth in the 1913 Leinster Senior Football Championship. London entered the National Football League in 1993 and were initially fairly successful with two wins, two draws and two losses in the county's first campaign. The renewed effort coincided with a drive to establish the games in schools.

London has fielded a senior team in the Connacht Senior Football Championship, since 1975. In their first 37 years of competing in Connacht, London managed only one win: a 0–9 to 0–6 defeat of Leitrim in 1977. In 2011, they broke the streak, defeating Fermanagh by a scoreline of 0–15 to 0–9 in Ruislip in the first round of the 2011 All-Ireland SFC qualifiers.

In 2013, the GAA banned the county from travelling to Ireland for warm-up games, as a result of a GAA rule put in place to prevent Ireland-based teams travelling abroad for training camps in the run up to the championship. This put London at a major disadvantage to other counties. However, the same year, London defeated Sligo by a scoreline of 1–12 to 0–14 to gain its second-ever victory in the Connacht SFC, with Lorcan Mulvey scoring the vital London goal. London held Leitrim in the Connacht SFC semi-final before winning the replay. London lost the final to Mayo. Entering Round 4 of the 2013 All-Ireland SFC qualifiers — London's first time at that level - they were paired with Cavan, Cavan won by a score of 1–17 to 1–08 at Croke Park to proceed to the All-Ireland quarter-finals. Lorcan Mulvey was later nominated for an All Star Award, but was not selected.

London withdrew from the 2020 championship due to the impact of the COVID-19 pandemic on Gaelic games. London was excluded from the 2021 league and championship for the same reason. London returned in 2022. The county won its opening three fixtures of the 2022 National Football League against Carlow, Waterford, and Leitrim, with the wins against Carlow and Leitrim coming away from home.

In 2024, London played in the FBD for the first time in 15 years, beating Mayo but losing to Roscommon. They went on to beat Offaly in the 2024 Tailteann Cup.

In the 14th minute of London's 2025 match against Roscommon in Ruislip, Liam Gallagher scored the first two-pointer in All-Ireland Senior Football Championship history.

London host the other teams in the Connacht SFC at Ruislip on a rotational basis, with Mayo playing them in 2026 and Leitrim due to play them in 2027.

London also have a junior side playing in the All-Britain Football Championship and the All-Ireland Junior Football Championship.

== Panel ==
The following players were selected as part of the senior football panel for London's Tailteann Cup match against Laois on 23rd May 2026:

No.	Player	Position	Club
1	Andy Walsh		Fulham Irish
2	Nathan Feeney		North London Shamrocks
3	Conor O'Donohue		St Kiernans
4	Sean O'Donoghue		St Brendans
5	Finbarr Crowley		North London Shamrocks
6	Conal Gallagher		Fulham Irish
7	David Gouldson		St Brendans
8	Liam Gallagher		Tír Chonaill Gaels
9	Daniel Clarke		North London Shamrocks
10	Josh Obahor		Parnells
11	Joe McGill		North London Shamrocks
12	Kristian Healy		Round Towers
13	Michael O'Reilly		North London Shamrocks
14	Shay Rafter		Tara
15	Jim Davis		Round Towers

No.	Player	Position	Club
16	Cormac McConnell		St Brendans
17	Liam Crowley		Round Towers
18	Liam Murphy		North London Shamrocks
19	Tighe Barry		Parnells
20	Henry Walsh		Tír Chonaill Gaels
21	Conor Goggin		Round Towers
22	George Durrant		Wandsworth Gaels
23	Ciaran Diver		North London Shamrocks
24	Darragh Griffin		Parnells
25	Nathan McElwaine		North London Shamrocks
26	Stephen Henry		Wandsworth Gaels

^{INJ} Player has had an injury which has affected recent involvement with the county team.
^{RET} Player has since retired from the county team.
^{WD} Player has since withdrawn from the county team due to a non-injury issue.

== Management team ==
- Manager: Michael Maher
- Selectors: Chris Byrne, Joseph Coulter, Noel Dunning
- Strength and conditioning coaches: Ross Bennett, Colm Smith
- Performance analyst: Shane Mangan

== Managerial history ==
The following is a table of London's county football managers at senior level since 1990. In October 2019, London-born Michael Maher became the first native to take charge of the London county football team. Maher experienced success while managing London sides at youth level and was part of former manager Ciarán Deely's backroom team for 2019.

Years	Name	County
1990	Tom Roche	Kerry
1991	Paddy Corscadden; John McPartland	Longford; Down
1992	Seamus Carr	Donegal
1993–1994	PJ McGinley	Donegal
1995–1998	Pat Griffin	Kerry
1999–2000	Tommy McDermott	Donegal
2001	Tom Roche*	Kerry
2002	Iggy Donnelly; Pat Griffin; Dermot O'Brien	Tyrone; Kerry; Laois
2002–2003	Chris Lloyd	Longford
2004	John McPartland	Down
2005–2010	Noel Dunning	Westmeath
2011–2015	Paul Coggins	Roscommon
2016–2019	Ciarán Deely	Wexford
2019–	Michael Maher**	London

* Withdrew from later stages of the 2001 League season due to the UK's foot-and-mouth outbreak and championship.

** Withdrew in 2020, fully on that occasion, and also did not play any games in 2021 due to the impact of the COVID-19 pandemic on Gaelic games.

== Honours ==
=== Senior ===
- All-Ireland Senior Football Championship^{[a]}
  - (silver) Runners-up (5): 1900, 1901, 1902, 1903, 1908
  - (bronze) Semi-finalists (3): 1906, 1907, 1910
- Connacht Senior Football Championship
  - (silver) Runners-up (1): 2013
- McGrath Cup
  - (gold) Winners (1): 1988

=== Junior ===
- All-Ireland Junior Football Championship
  - (gold) Winners (6): 1938, 1966, 1969, 1970, 1971, 1986
- All-Britain Football Championship
  - (gold) Winners (23): 1962, 1964, 1966, 1967, 1968, 1969, 1970, 1971, 1973, 1974, 1975, 1982, 1986, 1988, 1991, 1992, 1995, 2005, 2007, 2009, 2022, 2024, 2025

== Notes ==
a. London received a bye to the final in five seasons.
