= London GAA =

Gaelic games governing body in the UK

- Irish: Londain
- Nickname(s): The Exiles
- Founded: 1896; 130 years ago
- Province: Britain
- Ground(s): McGovern Park,Ruislip
- County colours: Green White

County teams
- NFL: Division 4
- NHL: Division 2
- Football Championship: Tailteann Cup
- Hurling Championship: Christy Ring Cup
- Ladies' Gaelic football: West County Hotel Cup

County colours

The London County Board of the Gaelic Athletic Association (GAA), known as CLG Londain or London GAA, is one of the county boards outside Ireland and is responsible for Gaelic games in London. The county board is also responsible for the London county teams. With Gloucestershire, Hertfordshire, Lancashire, Scotland, Warwickshire, and Yorkshire, the board makes up the British Provincial Board.

== History ==
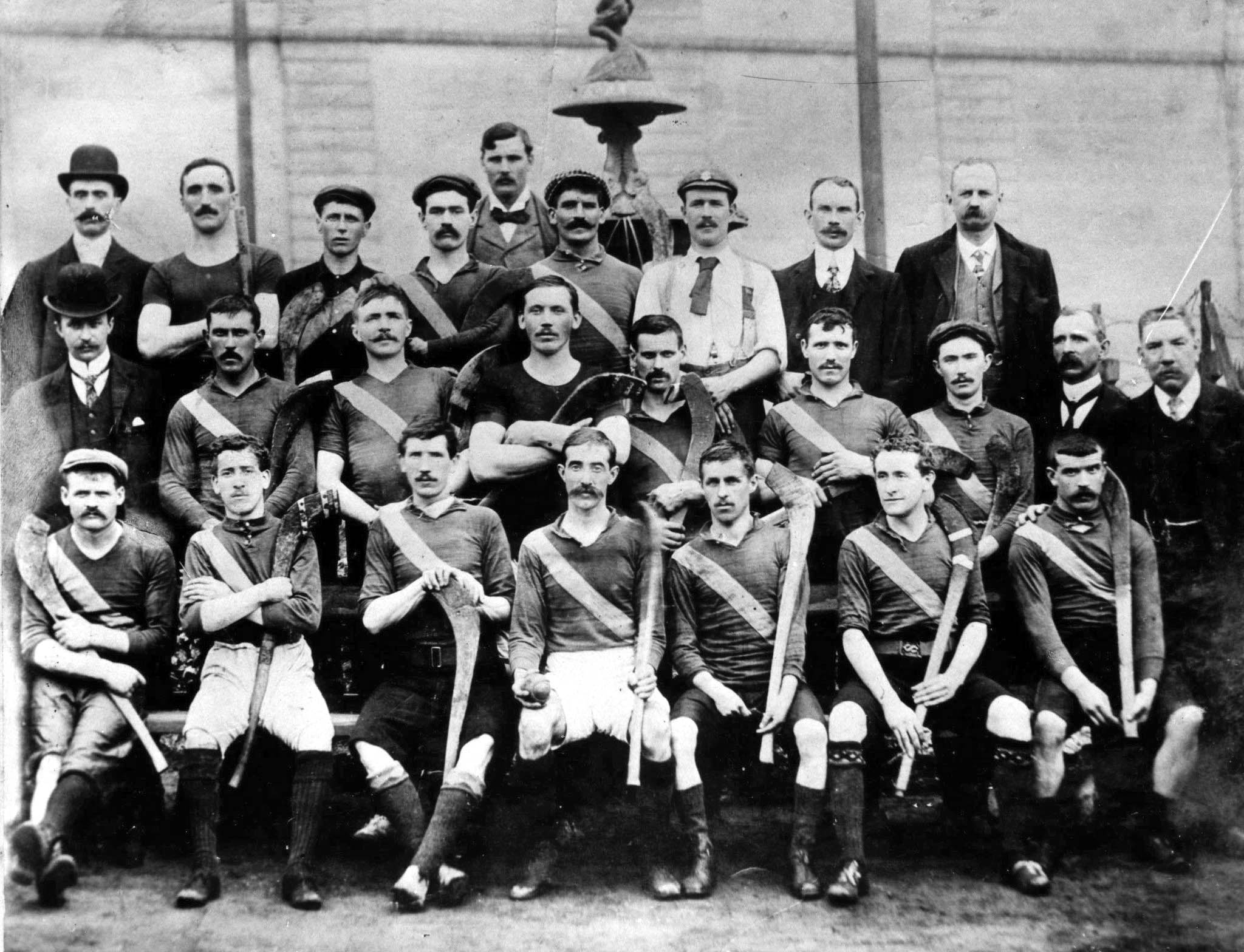
London's champion hurling team, 1901

Evidence of Gaelic sports in London can be found as far back as 1775, when it was reported that a large group of Irish people had gathered together and played a ‘hurling match on a sports field near to Camden Town’. By 1876, there was reports of how, to celebrate St Patrick's Day, Irish people had 'met in force at Muswell Hill, and took part in the sport of “hurling”'. London is recorded as the site of the first composite rules shinty–hurling match with London Camanachd in 1896.

GAA clubs began to emerge in London in 1895, and in 1896, following a showcase event at Stamford Bridge, the London County Board was founded. In the early days of London GAA, Michael Collins, Sam Maguire and Liam MacCarthy were all prominent in London GAA; Collins was treasurer of the county board, while Maguire and MacCarthy both served periods as president. In 1901, London won the All-Ireland Senior Hurling Championship, one of only 11 counties to have ever done so.

The Provincial Council of Britain was formed in 1926, with London as one of its founding members. By 1934, the London County Board reported seven football clubs and six hurling clubs, increased to eleven football clubs and seven hurling clubs by 1936. While many factors were at play, the social, economic, and racial discrimination experienced by Irish migrants in Britain often encouraged Irish communities to congregate together, with GAA clubs often at the centre. The role migrants in developing and sustaining GAA structures in London is reflected in the county's nickname: ‘the Exiles’.

The post-war era also saw London GAA establish its own playing grounds, purchasing part of a former cricket ground in New Eltham and establishing a pavilion and a number of pitches, creating London's first dedicated Irish sporting space. London GAA relocated their grounds to Ruislip in the late 1970s, reflecting a shift of the Irish population in London, with the north London areas of Dollis Hill, Neasden, Cricklewood and Kilburn becoming known as ‘Little Eire’ to Irish migrants. The county grounds and headquarters of London GAA remain at this site, McGovern Park, formerly known as the Emerald GAA Grounds.

The GAA held annual exhibition games between Irish county teams in London, firstly at Mitcham Stadium prior to its demolition in 1955, and then at Wembley Stadium from 1958 to 1975, peaking in 1962, when over 40,000 spectators attended.

London has taken a fuller role in inter-county Gaelic games in the latter period of the 20th century, playing annually in the Connacht Senior Football Championship since 1975, the Ulster Senior Hurling Championship since 1998, and the National Leagues since 1993. Ladies' football also emerged this period, with the first teams established in 1976 and the London LGFA board being formed in 1986. The London teams have seen various successes in inter-county Gaelic games, especially since the turn of the millennium, with successes in the Nicky Rackard Cup, the Christy Ring Cup, and the All-Ireland Junior Ladies' Football Championship, as well as a surprise run to become runners-up in the Connacht SFC in 2013. London has also excelled in the British inter-county competitions, becoming the most successful British team in men's football, ladies' football, and hurling.

== Football ==
=== Clubs ===
Club name	Teams	Location
Cu Chulainns	Men's - Intermediate	Rotherhithe
Dulwich Harps	Men's - Senior Ladies' - Junior	Dulwich
Éire Óg	Men's - Intermediate	Haringey
Fr Murphys	Ladies' - Junior	East Acton
Fulham Irish	Men's - Senior / Junior B	Fulham
Gael Londain	Men's - Junior	Sunbury-on-Thames
Garryowen	Men's - Junior	Dollis Hill
Harlesden Harps	Men's - Intermediate	Acton
Holloway Gaels	Ladies' - Intermediate / Junior	Holloway
Kingdom Kerry Gaels	Men's - Intermediate	Finchley
North London Shamrocks	Men's - Senior / Junior / Junior B	Palmers Green
Parnells	Men's - Senior / Junior Ladies' - Junior	Harrow
Round Towers	Men's - Senior / Junior B Ladies' - Intermediate	Mitcham
St Brendans	Men's - Intermediate	Isleworth
St Clarets	Men's - Intermediate	Hayes
St Josephs	Men's - Junior	Brentford
St Kiernans	Men's - Senior / Junior / Junior B Ladies' - Junior	Chipping Barnet
Tara	Men's - Intermediate / Junior Ladies' - Intermediate / Junior	Greenford
Thomas McCurtains	Men's - Intermediate Ladies' - Intermediate	Goodmayes
Tir Chonaill Gaels	Men's - Senior / Junior Ladies' - Intermediate	Greenford
Wandsworth Gaels	Men's - Senior / Junior B Ladies' - Intermediate / Junior	Barn Elms

Location of GAA clubs in Greater London (Greater London)

=== London Men's Senior Football Championship winners ===
- 1897 Ireland United
- 1898 Hibernians
- 1899 Hibernians
- 1900 Robert Emmetts
- 1901 Hibernians
- 1902 Hibernians
- 1903 Hibernians
- 1904 Hibernians
- 1905 Milesians
- 1906 Milesians
- 1907 Hibernians
- 1908 William Rooneys
- 1909 Hibernians
- 1910 Hibernians
- 1911 Hibernians
- 1912 William Rooneys
- 1913 William Rooneys
- 1914 William Rooneys
- 1915 Gerldines
- 1916
- 1917
- 1918
- 1919
- 1920
- 1921 Brothers Pearse
- 1922 Fintan Lalors
- 1923 Rory O'Connors
- 1924 Fintan Lalors
- 1925
- 1926 St Patricks
- 1927 Brothers Pearse
- 1928 Shamrocks
- 1929 St Patricks
- 1930 St Patricks
- 1931 Shamrocks
- 1932 Shamrocks
- 1933 Round Towers
- 1934 Thomas McCurtains
- 1935 Thomas McCurtains
- 1936 Fintan Lalors
- 1937 Fintan Lalors
- 1938 Brothers Pearse
- 1939 Granuaile
- 1940 Round Towers
- 1941 Shamrock-Tara
- 1942 Shamrock-Tara
- 1943 Cuchullains
- 1944 Cuchullains
- 1945 Tara
- 1946 St Patricks
- 1947 Tara
- 1948 St Josephs
- 1949 Naomh Mhuire
- 1950 Naomh Mhuire
- 1951 Tara
- 1952 Cuchullains
- 1953 St Vincents
- 1954 St Vincents
- 1955 Naomh Mhuire
- 1956 Garryowen
- 1957 Shamrocks
- 1958 Garryowen
- 1959 Shamrocks
- 1960 St Monicas
- 1961 St Vincents
- 1962 Parnells
- 1963 Naomh Mhuire
- 1964 Round Towers
- 1965 Round Towers
- 1966 Parnells
- 1967
- 1968 Naomh Mhuire
- 1969 Garryowen
- 1970 Sean Treacys
- 1971 Parnells
- 1972 Garryowen
- 1973 Kingdom
- 1974 Kingdom
- 1975 Kingdom
- 1976 Kingdom
- 1977 Kingdom
- 1978 Kingdom
- 1979 Parnells
- 1980 Garryowen
- 1981 Parnells
- 1982 Round Towers
- 1983 Tir Chonaill Gaels
- 1984 Moindearg
- 1985 Kingdom
- 1986 Kingdom
- 1987 Kingdom
- 1988 Parnells
- 1989 Kingdom
- 1990 Tir Chonaill Gaels
- 1991 Parnells
- 1992 Tir Chonaill Gaels
- 1993 Tir Chonaill Gaels
- 1994 St Brendans
- 1995 Tara
- 1996 Tir Chonaill Gaels
- 1997 Tir Chonaill Gaels
- 1998 Tir Chonaill Gaels
- 1999 Neasden Gaels
- 2000 Tir Chonail Gaels
- 2001 Tir Chonail Gaels
- 2002 St Brendans
- 2003 Tara
- 2004 Kingdom Kerry Gaels
- 2005 Tir Chonaill Gaels
- 2006 St Brendans
- 2007 Tir Chonaill Gaels
- 2008 Tir Chonaill Gaels
- 2009 Tir Chonaill Gaels
- 2010 Neasden Gaels
- 2011 Fulham Irish
- 2012 Tir Chonail Gaels
- 2013 Kingdom Kerry Gaels
- 2014 Tir Chonaill Gaels
- 2015 Tir Chonaill Gaels
- 2016 St Kiernans
- 2017 Fulham Irish
- 2018 Tir Chonaill Gaels
- 2019 Tir Chonaill Gaels
- 2020 Fulham Irish
- 2021 St Kiernans
- 2022 St Kiernans
- 2023 Fulham Irish
- 2024 North London Shamrocks
- 2025 North London Shamrocks

==== Roll of honour ====
- 18 - Tir Chonaill Gaels
- 12 - Kingdom Kerry Gaels
- 10 - Hibernians
- 7 - Parnells
- 6 - Garryowen
- 5 - Shamrocks, Naomh Mhuire, Round Towers
- 4 - William Rooneys, Fintan Lalors, St Patricks, Fulham Irish
- 3 - Brothers Pearse, Cu Chullains, St Vincents, St Brendans, St Kiernans
- 2 - Milestians, Thomas McCurtains, Shamrocks-Tara, Neasden Gaels, North London Shamrocks
- 1 - Ireland United, Robert Emmetts, Geraldines, Rory O'Connors, Granuaile, St Josephs, St Monicas, Seán Treacys, Moindearg

=== County team ===
London fields a men's senior county team in the Connacht Senior Football Championship and the All-Ireland Senior Football Championship (or Tailteann Cup), as well as Division 4 of the National Football League. They are the only senior men's county team in Britain. They also field a men's junior county team in the All-Britain Junior Football Championship within the post-2022 format of the All-Ireland Junior Football Championship.

The ladies' county team competes in the Ulster Junior Ladies' Football Championship and the All-Ireland Junior Ladies' Football Championship, the only ladies' county team in Britain to do so. They also field a team in the All-Britain Junior Ladies' Football Championship.

==== Honours ====
- Men's
  - All-Ireland Junior Football Championship
    - (gold) Winners (7): 1938, 1966, 1969, 1970, 1971, 1986, 2026
    - (silver) Runners-Up (26): 1929, 1931, 1932, 1933, 1934, 1935, 1937, 1939, 1947, 1948, 1950, 1952, 1954, 1956, 1959, 1960, 1962, 1964, 1967, 1968, 1973, 1988, 1991, 1995, 2024, 2025
  - All-Britain Junior Football Championship
    - (gold) Winners (24): 1962, 1964, 1966, 1967, 1968, 1969, 1970, 1971, 1973, 1974, 1975, 1982, 1986, 1988, 1991, 1992, 1995, 2005, 2007, 2009, 2022, 2024, 2025, 2026
  - McGrath Cup
    - (gold) Winners: 1988
  - Connacht Senior Football Championship
    - (silver) Runners-Up: 2013
- Ladies'
  - All-Ireland Junior Ladies' Football Championship
    - (gold) Winners (2): 1993, 2008
    - (silver) Runners-Up (5): 1988, 1990, 1991, 1992, 2007
  - All-Britain Junior Ladies' Football Championship
    - (gold) Winners (9): 1990, 1991, 1992, 1993, 1999, 2007, 2008, 2019, 2022

== Hurling / camogie ==
=== Clubs ===
Club name	Teams	Location
Brothers Pearse	Hurling - Senior	Wembley
Cu Chulainns	Hurling - Intermediate	Rotherhithe
Fr Murphys	Hurling - Senior / Intermediate Camogie - Senior	East Acton
Fulham Irish	Hurling - Intermediate	Fulham
Granuaile	Hurling - Intermediate	Harrow
Green Isle	Camogie - Intermediate	Canada Water
Kilburn Gaels	Hurling - Senior / Intermediate	Kilburn
Robert Emmetts	Hurling - Senior	Greenford
St Gabriels	Hurling - Senior / Intermediate	Wembley
Seán Treacys	Hurling - Senior	Tooting
South West Gaels	Camogie - Intermediate	Croydon
Tara	Camogie - Senior / Intermediate	Greenford
Thomas McCurtains	Hurling - Intermediate Camogie - Senior / Intermediate	Goodmayes

=== London Senior Hurling Championship winners ===
- 1897 Ireland United
- 1898 Robert Emmetts
- 1899 Robert Emmetts
- 1900 Desmond Rovers
- 1901 Robert Emmetts
- 1902 Robert Emmetts
- 1903 Brian Borus
- 1904 Hibernians
- 1905 Robert Emmetts
- 1906 Robert Emmetts
- 1907 Hibernians
- 1908 William Rooneys
- 1909 Brian Borus
- 1910 Michael Cusacks
- 1911
- 1912 Geraldines
- 1913 Geraldines
- 1914 Geraldines
- 1915 Geraldines
- 1916
- 1917
- 1918
- 1919
- 1920
- 1921 Eire Óg
- 1922 Fintan Lalors
- 1923 Fintan Lalors
- 1924 Brothers Pearse
- 1925
- 1926 Brian Borus
- 1927 Fintan Lalors
- 1928 Fintan Lalors
- 1929 Brian Boru
- 1930 Fintan Lalors
- 1931
- 1932 Brian Borus
- 1933 Tara
- 1934 Tara
- 1935 Cuchullains
- 1936 Brothers Pearse
- 1937 Tara
- 1938 Brothers Pearse
- 1939 Brian Borus
- 1940 Erins Hope
- 1941 Brian Borus
- 1942 Brian Borus
- 1943 Brian Borus
- 1944 Brian Borus
- 1945 Brian Borus
- 1946 Brian Borus
- 1947 Brothers Pearse
- 1948 Brian Boru
- 1949 Naomh Mhuire
- 1950 Naomh Mhuire
- 1951 Cuchullains
- 1952 Cuchullains
- 1953 Naomh Mhuire
- 1954 Cuchullains
- 1955 Brian Borus
- 1956 Young Irelands
- 1957 Brothers Pearse
- 1958 Brothers Pearse
- 1959 Brothers Pearse
- 1960 Brian Borus
- 1961 Sean McDermotts
- 1962 Brian Borus
- 1963 Brian Borus
- 1964 Brian Borus
- 1965 St Gabriels
- 1966 Brian Borus
- 1967 Cuchullains
- 1968 Brothers Pearse
- 1969 Brian Borus
- 1970 Brian Borus
- 1971 Brian Borus
- 1972 Brothers Pearse
- 1973 St Gabriels
- 1974 St Gabriels
- 1975 Brian Borus
- 1976 St Gabriels
- 1977 St Gabriels
- 1978 St Gabriels
- 1979 Brian Borus
- 1980 Brian Borus
- 1981 St Gabriels
- 1982 Brian Borus
- 1983 Desmonds
- 1984 Sean Treacys
- 1985 Desmonds
- 1986 St Gabriels
- 1987 Thomas McCurtains
- 1988 Desmonds
- 1989 Desmonds
- 1990 St Gabriels
- 1991 Sean Treacys
- 1992 Desmonds
- 1993 Sean Treacys
- 1994 Sean Treacys
- 1995 St Gabriels
- 1996 St Gabriels
- 1997 St Gabriels
- 1998 Brothers Pearse
- 1999 St Gabriels
- 2000 Fr Murphys
- 2001 Fr Murphys
- 2002 Sean Treacys
- 2003 Fr Murphys
- 2004 Robert Emmetts
- 2005 Fr Murphys
- 2006 Robert Emmetts
- 2007 Robert Emmetts
- 2008 Robert Emmetts
- 2009 St Gabriels
- 2010 Kilburn Gaels
- 2011 Robert Emmetts
- 2012 St Gabriels
- 2013 St Gabriels
- 2014 Kilburn Gaels
- 2015 Robert Emmetts
- 2016 Robert Emmetts
- 2017 Kilburn Gaels
- 2018 St Gabriels
- 2019 Robert Emmetts
- 2020 Brothers Pearse
- 2021 Robert Emmetts
- 2022 St Gabriels
- 2023 Brothers Pearse
- 2024 St Gabriels
- 2025 St Gabriels
- 2026 Brothers Pearse

==== Roll of honour ====
- 26 - Brian Borus
- 20 - St Gabriels
- 13 - Brothers Pearse
- 8 - Robert Emmetts
- 5 - Seán Treacys, Desmonds, Fintan Lalors
- 4 - Geraldines, Cu Chulainns, Fr Murphys
- 3 - Tara, Naomh Mhuire, Kilburn Gaels
- 2 - Hibernians
- 1 - Ireland United, Desmond Rovers, William Rooneys, Michael Cusacks, Éire Óg, Erins Hope, Young irelands, Sean McDermotts, Thomas McCurtains

=== County team ===
London fields a senior county hurling team in the Joe McDonagh Cup, as well as Division 2 of the National Hurling League.

==== Honours ====
- Hurling
  - All-Ireland Senior Hurling Championship
    - (gold) Winners: 1901
  - All-Ireland Junior Hurling Championship
    - (gold) Winners (5): 1938, 1949, 1959, 1960, 1963
  - Nicky Rackard Cup
    - (gold) Winners (2): 2005, 2011
  - Christy Ring Cup
    - (gold) Winners: 2012
  - National Hurling League Division 3B
    - (gold) Winners: 2009

== Handball ==
Handball is one of the Gaelic games administered under the auspices of the GAA and has a long history in London. London hosted the All-Ireland Handball Finals in 1990, having also retained the title won the previous year.

The modern game in London is predominantly played in the one-wall code. According to The Irish Post, organised handball activity in Britain experienced significant growth during the 1980s, with Britain entering the World Handball Championships for the first time in 1984. London-based players including Sean O'Mahony, Michael Collins and Joe O'Brien were among those representing Britain internationally during this period.

Following the demolition of the handball court at Kilburn, participation declined, although organised competition continued. In the 21st century, handball activity in London has centred on one-wall handball competitions and development initiatives. The London League and Paddy Fox Cup are among the principal competitions contested by players based in London and elsewhere in Britain.

In 2026, a dedicated Gaelic handball court was opened at Stockwell Hall of Fame in south London with the support of London GAA and local community organisations.<ref>{{cite web |title=This Sunday a new Gaelic Handball Court is being launched at the Stockwell Hall of Fame. The facility has since been used for coaching, recreational play and competition.

Currently, organised one wall handball activity in London is centred on the Thomas McCurtains club, whose players compete in national and international tournaments including the World Championships, Irish National Championships and British events.
