= Tír Chonaill Gaels =

Gaelic football club in London

Tir Chonaill Gaels GFC
- Gaeil Thír Chónaill
- Founded: 1962
- County: London
- Nickname: TCG, The Gaels
- Colours: White and Red
- Grounds: Tír Chonaill Park, Greenford
- Coordinates: 51.546348°N 0.334948°W

Playing kits
Standard colours

Senior Club Championships
	All Ireland	Britain champions	London champions
Football:	-	-	16

Tír Chonaill Gaels Gaelic Football Club are a Gaelic football club based in Greenford, London. The club was formed in London in 1962, making it one of the oldest clubs outside Ireland. The club is one of the most successful in the London GAA, with many players representing London at Inter-County level.

== History ==
The club was founded in 1962 by men hailing from County Donegal, Ireland. The first club meeting took place at the Red Lion Pub in Kilburn, London. The club is now one of the most successful in London and Britain. They won the junior championship and league in 1963, then winning the intermediate championship and league in the 70s, as well as claiming the Sean Shiels and Murphy Cups. The club continued to strengthen and won its first Senior London Championship in 1983, as well as winning the All-Britain Championship. Since then the club has won eight London and British Senior Championships.

The club has also won numerous All British B&I nine a-side tournaments. They have also completed in the Kilmacud sevens in Dublin on many occasions. The Gaels have played in this tournament more times than any other overseas team. The club in recent years have a policy of playing a number of friendly matches against teams from Ireland. Either the club goes back to visit these teams or the club will play host to these teams.

Over the years the club has had the honour of playing against some of the finest teams from Ireland either in competition or in friendlies. The club has played in ten All-Ireland Senior Club Football Championship quarter-finals against teams such as Lavey (Derry) twice, Knockmore (Mayo), Salthill-Knocknacarra (Galway) Crossmaglen Rangers (Armagh) twice, Nemo Rangers (Cork), Castlehaven (Cork), Ballinderry (Derry), Burren (Down) and Castlebar Mitchels (Mayo). They have also played a number of prestige friendlies against teams such as Chíll Chartha (Donegal), Na Cealla Beaga (Donegal), Civil Service (Dublin), St Olafs (Dublin), Ballyshannon (Donegal), Donegal (New York), University of Ulster (Belfast) and many more.

The club celebrated its fortieth anniversary with a weekend of celebrations that took place on the last weekend of October 2002.

== Football Titles ==
- London Senior Football Championships: 18
  - 1983, 1990, 1992, 1993, 1996, 1997, 1998, 2000, 2003, 2005, 2007, 2008, 2009, 2012, 2014, 2015, 2018, 2019
- All Britain Champions (9)*: 1983, 1990, 1992, 1993, 1996, 1997, 1998, 2000, 2001
- Tipperary Cup (15): 1982, 1996, 2002, 2005, 2006, 2007, 2013, 2014, 2018, 2019, 2020, 2021, 2022, 2023 ,2024
- Conway Cup (14): 1986, 1992, 1993, 1996, 2002, 2003, 2004, 2006, 2007, 2010, 2012, 2014, 2018, 2019
- London Senior Division 1 League (16): 1983, 1996, 1998, 1999, 2001, 2003, 2006, 2007, 2009, 2010, 2012, 2014, 2015, 2018, 2019, 2021
- London Intermediate Football Championship(2): 1971, 1981
- London Junior Football Championship (3): 1963, 1977, 2018**,2025

* = London Senior Champions no longer entered the All Britain championship after 2002 and went straight into the All Ireland quarter final
** = Tir Chonaill Gaels 2018 Junior Championship win was the first in London composed fully of homegrown players.

== Former players ==
- Ciaran Bonner – won the 2007 National Football League with Donegal.
- Barry Brennan – Played in the early nineties, and won one All-Ireland with Galway and two All Stars.
- Barry Cunningham – won an All-Ireland Senior Football Championship medal with Donegal in 1992.
- James McCartan Jnr – won two All-Irelands with Down in 1991 and 1994 and two All Stars.
- Kevin McMenamin – won the 2007 National Football League with Donegal.
- Jody Gormley – Jody played in midfield for Tyrone in the 1995 All-Ireland defeat against Dublin. Has also played Railway Cup for Ulster.
- John McParland – Played with the club in the eighties, and was a member of the team that won the senior Championship in 1983. He also managed the club to two London and British senior Championships in 1997 and 1998. John also won a Sigerson Cup medal with Maynooth College, He also played for Down in the National League and Championship on many occasions. He also played for London on many occasions and managed them in 2004 with the assistance of Maurice Somers.
- D. J. Kane – Played with the club in the late eighties before going on the captain Down to All- Ireland success in 94. He also won an All-Ireland in 1991. Has also won an Allstar and played Railway Cup for Ulster on a number of occasions.
- Timmy Connolly – Played for Antrim regularly in the late eighties and early nineties. Also made a number of appearances for Ulster in the Railway Cup.
- Maurice Somers – Played with the club between 1994 and 2001, won 5 London Senior Football Championships
- Tommy McGuire – was a prominent member of the London team of the 1990s and won 2 Sigerson Cups with University of Ulster Jordanstown and played Senior County Football for Fermanagh. He also has captained and managed Tír Chónaill Gaels over the years collecting every major award in London football on numerous occasions.

== See also ==
- Paul Coggins
