= List of Gaelic games clubs outside Ireland =

This is a list of Gaelic games clubs across the world outside Ireland, organised by the club's associated county (the name for a unit in which a club is grouped).

Gaelic games clubs exist on every continent (except Antarctica).

Common abbreviations used in club names are:

- CC: Camogie Club or Cumann Camogaíochta
- CLG: Cumann Lútchleas Gael (Gaelic Athletic Club, or Gaelic Athletic Association)
- CPG: Cumann Peile Gaelach (Gaelic Football Club)
- GAA: Gaelic Athletic Association (now often used for individual clubs)
- GAC: Gaelic Athletic Club (often denotes that more than one sport is played)
- GFC: Gaelic Football Club
- HC: Hurling Club
- HCC: Hurling and Camogie Club
- LGFC: Ladies' Gaelic Football Club

== Africa ==
=== Egypt ===
- Cairo GAA

=== South Africa ===
- SA Gaels
- Zulu Gaels

=== Uganda ===
- Nile Óg Cusacks
- Simba Wolfhounds
- Uganda GAA

== Asia ==
see also Asian GAA

=== Cambodia ===
- Cairde Khmer GAA

=== China ===
- Beijing GAA
- Canton Celts
- Dalian Wolfhounds
- Lantau Warriors
- Shanghai GAA
- Shenzhen Celts
- Suzhou Éire Óg
- Hong Kong GAA

=== Indonesia ===
- Jakarta Dragonflies

=== Japan ===
- Japan GAA
- Tokyo Samurai

=== Laos ===
- Mekong Shamrocks

=== Philippines ===
- Manila GAA

=== Malaysia ===
- Orang Eire GAA
- Johor Bahru GAA
- Penang Pumas

=== Myanmar ===
- The Celts (Myanmar Celts Gaelic Sports Association)

=== Singapore ===
- Singapore Gaelic Lions

=== South Korea ===
- Daegu Fianna
- Laochra Busan
- Seoul Gaels
- Inis Jeju

=== Taiwan ===
- Taiwan Celts

=== Thailand ===
- Thailand GAA
- Bangkok Thai GAA

=== Vietnam ===
- Viet Celts Hanoi
- Saigon Gaels
- Na Fianna

== Australasia ==
=== Australia ===
New South Wales
- Australian Meath Club
- Bondi Gaels
- Central Coast
- Clan na Gael GFC
- Craobh Phadraigh
- Cormac McAnallens
- Irish Australians GFC
- Irish Rovers GFC
- Michael Cusack's
- Penrith Gaels
- Sydney Shamrocks
- Young Ireland Sydney

Queensland

- East Celts GFC
- Gold Coast Gaels
- Harps GFC
- John Mitchel's
- Shamrocks
- Souths
- Emeralds Hurling & Camogie Club
- Na Fianna Hurling & Camogie Club
- Cairns Chieftains
- Townsville Wolfhounds

South Australia

- Angry Leprechauns
- Backyarders
- Blacks Boys
- Blue Baggers
- Boagan's Heroes
- Dirty Dozen
- Eastern Gaels
- Éire We Go
- Flinders O'Neils
- Irish Australians
- Irish Australians Cougars
- Irish Australians Rovers
- Mitchell Park
- Na Fianna
- North Eastern Gaels
- Northern Gunners
- Onkaparinga
- Parkies
- POWA
- Red Army
- Red Lions
- Setanta
- Shenanigans
- Shin Boners
- Saint Brendan's GFC
- Steve Irwin All Stars
- Team Hoff
- The Lions
- The Royals
- The Surps
- The Titans
- TTG Units
- UNISA
- Valley Saints
- Western Ireland

Tasmania

- Clarence GFC
- Na Fianna GFC
- Hobart Celts GFC/LGFC
- North Hobart LGFC
- Old Lindisfarne GFC
- Shamrocks GFC/LGFC

Victoria

- Garryowen
- Grace O'Malley's
- Melbourne Shamrocks
- Padraig Pearse
- Sinn Féin
- St Kevins
- Wolfe Tones

Western Australia

- Bunbury GFC
- Greenwood GFC
- Morley Gaels GFC
- Southern Districts
- St Finbarr's Gaelic Football Club
- Western Shamrocks

=== New Zealand ===
Auckland
- Celtic
- Dale Paddy's GFC
- Gaels GFC
- Harps GFC
- Harps Rebels
- Hutt Valley
- Kitty O'Shea's
- Marist Gaels
- Marist Rangers
- Molly Malones
- Connemara Gaels
Wellington

== Britain ==
The county boards of Britain cover more than just the county from which they derive their name; for example, Yorkshire GAA covers the entire North East of England, including Tyne and Wear.

=== England ===
==== Gloucestershire ====
- Brighton & Crawley Gaels
- Bristol Harps
- St Jude's, Southampton
- St Piran's, Truro

==== Hertfordshire ====
- Cambridge Parnells
- Claddagh Gaels, Luton
- Éire Óg, Oxford
- Glen Rovers, Watford
- St Anthony's, Reading
- St Cedd's, Chelmsford
- St Colmcille's, St Albans
- St Dympna's, Luton
- St Joseph's, Waltham Cross
- St Vincent's, Luton

==== Lancashire ====
- Fullen Gaels, Manchester
- John Mitchel's, Liverpool
- Liverpool Wolfe Tones
- Oisín, Manchester
- Na Mic Tíre, Warrington
- St Brendan's, Manchester
- St Lawrence's, Manchester
- St Mary's, Manchester
- St Peter's, Manchester

==== London ====
- Brothers Pearse
- Cu Chulainns
- Dulwich Harps
- Éire Óg
- Fr. Murphy's
- Fulham Irish
- Granuaile
- Green Isle
- Gael Londain
- Garryowen
- Harlesden Harps
- Holloway Gaels
- Kilburn Gaels
- Kingdom Kerry Gaels
- North London Shamrocks
- Parnells
- Robert Emmetts
- Round Towers
- Sean Treacys
- South West Gaels
- St Brendan's
- St Claret's
- St Gabriel's
- St Joseph's
- St Kiernan's
- Tara
- Tír Chonaill Gaels
- Thomas McCurtain's
- Wandsworth Gaels

==== Warwickshire ====
- Erin Go Bragh, Birmingham
- John Mitchel's, Birmingham
- Four Masters, Coventry
- Naomh Pádraig, Leicester
- Rugby Gaels, Rugby
- Roger Casement's, Coventry
- Sean McDermott's, Birmingham
- Sons of Erin, Northampton
- St Barnabas, Nottingham
- St Brendan's, Birmingham
- St Joseph's, Derby
- St Finbarrs, Coventry
- St Mary's, Wolverhampton

==== Yorkshire ====
- Brothers Pearse, Huddersfield
- Cú Chulainn's, Newcastle
- Hugh O'Neills, Leeds
- John F Kennedys, Leeds
- St Benedict's Harps, Leeds
- St Vincent’s, Sheffield
- Tír na nÓg, Newcastle
- York Irish
- Yorkshire Emeralds, Leeds

=== Scotland ===
- Ceann Creige, Glasgow
- Dálriada, Aberdeen/Dundee
- Dúnedin Connollys, Edinburgh
- Glaschu Gaels, Glasgow
- Sands MacSwineys, Coatbridge
- Tír Conaill Harps, Glasgow

=== Wales ===
Teams in Wales are affiliated to Gloucestershire:

- Pride of Erin, Newport
- St Colmcille's, Cardiff

=== Isle of Man ===
Teams in the Isle of Man are affiliated to Lancashire:

- Ellen Vannin Gaels, Isle of Man

=== Jersey ===
- Jersey Irish

=== Gibraltar ===
- Gibraltar Gaels
- Gibraltar Harps

== Continental Europe ==
These are the 95 affiliated clubs as at May 2019.

== Middle East ==
=== Bahrain ===
- Arabian Celts

=== Kuwait ===
- Kuwait Harps

=== Oman ===
- Clann na hOman GAA

=== Qatar ===
- Qatar GAA (Oryx na hEireann)

=== Saudi Arabia ===
- Naomh Alee GAA Riyadh

=== United Arab Emirates ===
- Abu Dhabi Na Fianna
- Al Ain
- Al Reem Shamrocks
- Kerry Middle East GAA
- Donegal Dubai
- Dubai Celts
- Dubai Éire Óg
- Laochra Gaels
- Jumeirah Gaels
- RAK Ropairí
- Ruwais Gaels
- Sharjah Gaels

== North America ==
=== Canada ===
==== Eastern GAA Divisional Board ====
- Halifax Gaels GAA | Halifax, Nova Scotia
- Montreal Shamrocks GAC | Montreal, Québec
- Éire Óg Ottawa GAA | Ottawa, Ontario
- Ottawa Gaels GFC | Ottawa, Ontario
- Les Patriotes de Québec | Québec city, Québec
- Na Fianna Katarokwi | Kingston, Ontario
- Peterborough GAA | Peterborough, Ontario

==== Toronto GAA Divisional Board ====
- Durham Emmetts GFC : Durham, Ontario
- Michael Cusack Ladies GFC : Toronto, Ontario
- Roger Casement's GFC : Brampton, Ontario
- St Michael's H&FC : Toronto, Ontario
- St Pat's GFC : Toronto, Ontario
- St Vincent's GAC : Toronto, Ontario
- Toronto Gaels GFC : Toronto, Ontario
- Clan na Gael HC - Toronto, Ontario
- Na Piarsaigh CLG HC : Toronto, Ontario
- London Irish GAA Club : London, Ontario

==== Western Canada GAA Divisional Board ====
- Éire Óg, Red Deer, Alberta
- Vancouver Celts GFC, Vancouver, British Columbia
- Vancouver Harps GFC, Vancouver, British Columbia
- Calgary Chieftains, Calgary, Alberta
- Edmonton Wolfe Tones, Edmonton, Alberta
- JP Ryans Hurling Club, Vancouver, British Columbia
- Fraser Valley Gaels GFC, Vancouver, British Columbia
- Cú Chulainn GAA Club, Vancouver, British Columbia
- Vancouver Éire Óg GAA Club, Vancouver, British Columbia
- Van Isle Rovers GAC, Victoria, British Columbia

=== New York ===
- Armagh
- Astoria Gaels
- Cavan
- Clare
- Connecticut
- Cork
- Derry
- Donegal
- Down
- Fermanagh
- Fire Department
- Galway Football
- Galway Hurling
- Hoboken Guards (New Jersey)
- Kerry Junior
- Kerry Senior
- Leitrim
- Long Island Gaels / Brooklyn Shamrocks
- Manhattan Gaels
- Mayo
- Meath
- Monaghan
- Offaly Football
- Offaly Hurling
- Rangers
- Rockland
- St Barnabas
- St Raymond's
- Shannon Gaels
- Sligo
- Tipperary
- Tyrone

==== Minor Teams in New York ====
- Long Island Gaels
- Rockland
- St Barnabas
- St Brigid's
- Celtics
- St Patrick's
- St Brendan's
- St Raymonds
- St Joseph's
- Rangers
- WestPut
- Shannon Gaels

=== United States ===
==== Northeast Division ====
- Aidan McAnespie's Gaelic Football Club (GFC), Boston, MA -
- Barley House Wolves Hurling Club (HC), Concord, NH
- Boston Shamrocks Ladies Gaelic Football Club (LGFC), Boston, MA
- Boston Youth Gaelic Athletic Club (GAC: football & hurling), Boston, MA
- Christophers GFC, Boston, MA
- Connacht LGFC, Boston, MA
- Connemara Gaels GFC, Boston, MA
- Cork GFC, Boston, MA
- Cork HC, Boston, MA
- Donegal GFC, Boston, MA
- Fr Tom Burke's HC, Dorchester, MA
- Galway GFC, Boston, MA
- Galway HC, Boston, MA
- Hartford GAA, Hartford, CT
- Kerry GFC, Boston, MA
- Offaly HC, Boston, MA
- Portland HC, Portland, ME
- Portland Fomorians GFC, Portland, ME
- Providence Hurling Club, Providence, RI
- Sean Óg's GAA, Dorchester, MA
- Shannon Blues GFC, Boston, MA
- Tipperary HC, Boston, MA
- Tír na nÓg LGFC, Boston, MA
- Wexford HC, Boston, MA
- Wolfe Tones GFC, Boston, MA
- Worcester GAA Club, Worcester, MA

==== Southwestern Division ====
- Albuquerque Gaelic Football Club (GFC), Albuquerque, NM
- Celtic Cowboys GAA, Austin, TX
- Los Angeles Cougars GFC, Los Angeles, CA
- Mulhollands LGFC, Los Angeles, CA
- Denver Gaels GFC, Denver, CO
- Flagstaff Mountainhounds HC, Flagstaff, AZ
- Phoenix Gaels GAA, Phoenix, AZ
- Fionn MacCumhaill′s Dallas GAA, Dallas, TX
- Houston Gaels, Houston, TX
- Los Angeles Hurling Club, Los Angeles, CA
- Los San Patricios GAA, Mexico City, MEX
- Na Fianna LGAC, San Diego, CA
- San Antonio Gaelic Athletic Club (SAGAC San Patricios), San Antonio, TX
- Setanta GFC, San Diego, CA
- Wild Geese GFC, Orange County, CA
- Saint Peters Hurling Club, San Diego CA
- Regulators Hurling Club, Denver, CO

==== Philadelphia Division ====
- Allentown Hibernians Hurling Club, Allentown, PA
- Delaware County Harps Youth Gaelic Football Club, Philadelphia
- Delaware County Gaels Gaelic Athletic Club, Delaware County, PA
- St. Patrick's/Donegal GFC, Philadelphia
- Jersey Shore GAA, Middletown, NJ
- Kevin Barry's GFC, Philadelphia
- Na Tóraídhe HC, Philadelphia
- Notre Dame LGFC, Philadelphia
- Shamrocks HC, Philadelphia
- Shamrocks GFC, Philadelphia
- Young Irelanders GFC, Philadelphia
- Glenside Gaelic Club, Philadelphia
- South Jersey Rebels HC, Westville, NJ

==== Mid-Atlantic Division ====
- Baltimore Bohemians GAA, Baltimore, MD
- Coastal Virginia GAA, Virginia Beach, VA
- Richmond Battery GAA, Richmond, VA
- Michael Collins GFC, Alexandria, VA
- Washington DC Gaels GAA, Washington, DC

==== Central Division (Chicago) ====
- Chicago Celtics Youth Gaelic Football Club (GFC), Chicago, IL
- Chicago Youth GFC, Chicago, IL
- Cú Chulainn Hurling Club (HC), Chicago, IL
- Erin Rovers Ladies Gaelic Football Club (LGFC), Chicago, IL
- Harry Bolands HC, Chicago, IL
- James Joyce GFC, Chicago, IL
- John McBride's GFC, Chicago, IL
- Limerick HC, Chicago, IL
- Limerick Camogie Club (CC), Chicago, IL
- Na Aisling Gaels LGFC, Chicago, IL
- Michael Cusack HC, Chicago, IL
- Padraig Pearse GFC, Chicago, IL
- Parnells GFC, Chicago, IL
- Chicago Patriots Gaelic Football Club, Chicago, IL
- St Brendan's GFC, Chicago, IL
- St Brigid's LGFC, Chicago, IL
- St Mary's CC, Chicago, IL
- Chicago Wolfe Tones GFC, Chicago, IL

==== Heartland Division ====
- St. Louis Gaelic Athletic Club, St Louis, MO
- Twin Cities Lakelanders GFC, Minneapolis/St Paul, MN
- Twin Cities Robert Emmet's HC, Minneapolis/St Paul, MN
- Milwaukee Clash CC, Milwaukee, WI
- Milwaukee HC, Milwaukee, WI
- Miltown Gaels GFC, Milwaukee, WI
- Naperville Hurling Club, Naperville, IL
- Fox River Hurling Club, Appleton, WI
- Griobha GAC, Purdue University Hurling, West Lafayette, IN
- Hurling Club of Madison, Madison, WI
- Indianapolis GAA, Indianapolis, IN
- Tulsa GAA, Tulsa, OK
- Kansas City Gaelic Athletic Club, Kansas City, MO

==== Western Division ====
- Clan na Gael Ladies Gaelic Football Club (LGFC), San Francisco, CA
- Cú Chulainn CC, San Francisco, CA
- Éire Óg GFC, Burlingame, CA
- Fog City Harps LGFC, San Francisco, CA
- Irish Football Youth League, Youth Football and Hurling, San Francisco, CA
- Michael Cusack's GFC, San Francisco, CA
- Na Fianna Hurling Club (HC), San Francisco, CA
- Naomh Pádraig HC, San Francisco, CA
- Pearse Óg's GFC, San Francisco, CA
- San Francisco Rovers HC, San Francisco, CA
- Sean Treacy's GFC, San Francisco, CA
- Sons of Boru/Celts GFC, San Francisco, CA
- Tipperary HC, San Francisco, CA
- Ulster GFC, San Francisco, CA
- Young Irelanders/St Brendan's GFC, San Francisco, CA
- St Joseph's Hurling Club, Mountain View, CA

==== Southeast Division ====
- Atlanta Clan na nGael GAA, Atlanta, GA
- James Connolly's GAA, Charlotte, NC
- Savannah GAA, Savannah, GA
- Augusta Gaelic Sports Club, Augusta, GA
- Pooler GAA, Pooler, GA
- Red Wolves Hurling Club, Charlotte, NC
- Na Fianna LGFC, Atlanta, GA
- Orlando HC, Orlando, FL
- Charleston GAA, Charleston, SC
- Greenville Gaels HC, Greenville, SC
- Raleigh Cú Chulainn GAA, Raleigh, NC
- Winston-Salem Wolfhounds GAA, Winston-Salem, NC
- Knoxville Gaelic Athletic Club, Knoxville, TN
- Nashville Gaelic Athletic Club, Nashville, TN
- Memphis Gaelic Athletic Association, Memphis, TN
- Little Rock Gaelic Athletic Club, Little Rock, AR
- Tampa Bay GAA, Tampa, FL
- Cayman Islands GAA, Cayman Islands

==== Mid-West Division ====
- Cincinnati GAA, Cincinnati, OH
- Cleveland St Pat's St Jarlath's GFC, Cleveland, OH
- Cleveland St Pat's Ladies Gaelic Football Club (LGFC), Cleveland, OH
- Columbus Gaelic Football Club, Columbus, OH
- Akron Celtic Guards Hurling Club (HC), Akron, OH
- Pittsburgh Celtics GFC, Pittsburgh, PA
- Pittsburgh Banshees LGFC, Pittsburgh, PA
- Pittsburgh Pucas HC, Pittsburgh, PA
- Albany Rebels GFC, Albany, NY
- Buffalo Fenians GFC, Buffalo, NY
- Detroit Wolfe Tones GFC, Detroit, MI
- Detroit St. Anne's LGFC, Detroit, MI
- Roc City GAA, Rochester, NY
- Syracuse Celtics GFC, Syracuse, NY
- Kalamazoo GAA, Kalamazoo, MI
- Michigan Hurling Club, Detroit, MI

==== North Western Division ====
- Columbia Red Branch GAA, Portland, OR
- Seattle Gaels GAA, Seattle, WA
- Tacoma Rangers GAC, Tacoma, WA
- Grit City Hounds HC, Tacoma, WA
- Willamette Valley Nomads HC, Eugene, OR
- Thomas Meagher HC, Missoula, MT
- Wolfe Tones HC, Butte, MT

==== Bermuda ====
- Bermuda G.A.A. (founded in 2007)

=== Mexico ===
- Los San Patricios GAA Club, Mexico City

== South America ==
=== Chile ===
- Los Andes de Santiago (Gaelic football - mixed)

=== Argentina ===
- Hurling Club of Buenos Aires
- San Isidro Gaélico
- Club Atlético San Isidro
- Labardén
- Bulfin G.A.A.

=== Paraguay ===
- Paraguay G.A.A (Gaelic football)

=== Colombia ===
- Bogotá Beithígh (founded in 2024)

== See also ==
- List of Gaelic games clubs in Ireland
