= Geography of the GAA =

Gaelic games around the world

The following article provides a list of Gaelic games governing bodies, county boards and associations around the world. The principal governing body is the Gaelic Athletic Association (GAA).

The two dominant sports of the Gaelic games are traditionally played in separate regions of Ireland. Hurling is traditionally played mainly in the provinces of Munster and Leinster, whereas football is played in every county and is dominant in Ulster and Connacht and certain parts of the other provinces.

The dominant sport in each county of Ireland

== By continent ==
| Rank | Continent | No. of Clubs | Provincial boards | County boards |
|---|---|---|---|---|
| 1 | Europe | >2400 | 5 | 40 |
| 2 | North America | 192 | 0 | 3 |
| 3 | Oceania | 52 | 0 | 1 |
| 4 | Asia | 39 | 0 | 2 |
| 5 | South America | 5 | 0 | 0 |
| 6 | Africa | 3 | 0 | 0 |

== By country ==
| Rank | Country / territory | No. of Clubs |
|---|---|---|
| 1 | Republic of Ireland | 2,200 |
| 2 | United States | 144 |
| 3 | England | 78 |
| 4 | Australia | 70 |
| 5 | France | 34 |
| 6 | Canada | 28 |
| 7 | Spain | 24 |
| 8 | Germany | 11 |
| 8 | New Zealand | 11 |
| 10 | United Arab Emirates | 9 |
| 11 | China | 7 |
| 12 | Netherlands | 6 |
| 12 | Scotland | 6 |
| 14 | Argentina | 5 |
| 14 | Sweden | 5 |
| 16 | Italy | 4 |
| 16 | Switzerland | 4 |
| 17 | Belgium | 3 |
| 17 | Russia | 3 |
| 17 | South Korea | 3 |
| 17 | Vietnam | 3 |
| 18 | Austria | 2 |
| 18 | Czech Republic | 2 |
| 18 | Denmark | 2 |
| 18 | Finland | 2 |
| 18 | Malaysia | 2 |
| 18 | South Africa | 2 |
| 19 | Bahrain | 1 |
| 19 | Cambodia | 1 |
| 19 | Croatia | 1 |
| 19 | Estonia | 1 |
| 19 | Gibraltar | 1 |
| 19 | Guernsey | 1 |
| 19 | Hungary | 1 |
| 19 | Indonesia | 1 |
| 19 | Japan | 1 |
| 19 | Jersey | 1 |
| 19 | Kuwait | 1 |
| 19 | Luxembourg | 1 |
| 19 | Myanmar | 1 |
| 19 | Norway | 1 |
| 19 | Oman | 1 |
| 19 | Poland | 1 |
| 19 | Portugal | 1 |
| 19 | Qatar | 1 |
| 19 | Saudi Arabia | 1 |
| 19 | Singapore | 1 |
| 19 | Slovakia | 1 |
| 19 | Taiwan | 1 |
| 19 | Thailand | 1 |
| 19 | Uganda | 1 |

== By province ==
| Rank | Province | Clubs | Counties |
|---|---|---|---|
| 1 | Leinster | 685 | 12 |
| 2 | Munster | 645 | 6 |
| 3 | Ulster | 584 | 9 |
| 4 | Connacht | 212 | 5 |
| 5 | North America (unofficial province) | 192 | 3 |
| 6 | Europe (unofficial province) | 108 | 1 |
| 7 | Britain | 84 | 7 |
| 8 | Oceania (unofficial province) | 52 | 1 |
| 9 | Asia (unofficial province) | 39 | 2 |

== By county ==
| Rank | County | Clubs | Notes |
|---|---|---|---|
| 1 | Cork | 259 | Highest ranked Munster county |
| 2 | Dublin | 134 | Highest ranked Leinster county |
| 3 | United States | 123 | Highest ranked county outside Ireland |
| 4 | Antrim | 108 | Highest ranked Ulster county |
| 4 | Europe | 108 | |
| 6 | Limerick | 101 | |
| 7 | Wexford | 93 | |
| 8 | Clare | 84 | |
| 9 | Galway | 80 | Highest ranked Connacht county |
| 10 | Kerry | 73 | |
| 11 | Tipperary | 72 | |
| 12 | Down | 70 | |
| 13 | Tyrone | 68 | |
| 14 | Donegal | 63 | |
| 15 | Offaly | 61 | |
| 16 | Derry | 60 | |
| 17 | Meath | 59 | |
| 18 | Cavan | 59 | |
| 19 | Kildare | 57 | |
| 20 | Armagh | 56 | |
| 20 | Waterford | 56 | Lowest ranked Munster county |
| 22 | Australasia | 52 | |
| 23 | Mayo | 50 | |
| 23 | Monaghan | 50 | |
| 25 | Westmeath | 47 | |
| 26 | Laois | 46 | |
| 27 | Wicklow | 45 | |
| 28 | Louth | 42 | |
| 29 | Kilkenny | 41 | |
| 29 | New York | 41 | |
| 31 | Carlow | 33 | |
| 32 | London | 32 | Highest ranked British county |
| 32 | Roscommon | 32 | |
| 34 | Canada | 28 | |
| 35 | Sligo | 26 | |
| 36 | Leitrim | 24 | Lowest ranked Connacht county |
| 37 | Asia | 23 | |
| 37 | Fermanagh | 23 | Lowest ranked Ulster county |
| 39 | Longford | 22 | Lowest ranked Leinster county |
| 40 | Middle East | 16 | |
| 41 | Warwickshire | 15 | |
| 42 | Hertfordshire | 9 | |
| 43 | Lancashire | 8 | |
| 44 | Yorkshire | 7 | |
| 44 | Gloucestershire | 7 | |
| 46 | Scotland | 6 | |

== By division ==
| County | No. | Divisions/regions | Clubs |
|---|---|---|---|
| Cork | 8 | Avondhu | 26 |
| Cork | 8 | Beara | 6 |
| Cork | 8 | Carbery | 27 |
| Cork | 8 | Carrigdhoun | 11 |
| Cork | 8 | Duhallow | 20 |
| Cork | 8 | Imokilly | 24 |
| Cork | 8 | Muskerry | 22 |
| Cork | 8 | Seandún | 26 |
| Australasia | 8 | Canterbury | |
| Australasia | 8 | New South Wales | 16 |
| Australasia | 8 | Queensland | 13 |
| Australasia | 8 | South Australia | |
| Australasia | 8 | Tasmania | |
| Australasia | 8 | Victoria | 8 |
| Australasia | 8 | Wellington | |
| Australasia | 8 | Western Australia | 6 |
| Europe | 5 | Benelux | 15 |
| Europe | 5 | Central-East | 25 |
| Europe | 5 | Iberia | 25 |
| Europe | 5 | Nordic | 11 |
| Europe | 5 | North-West | 33 |
| Tipperary | 4 | Mid Tipperary | |
| Tipperary | 4 | North Tipperary | |
| Tipperary | 4 | South Tipperary | |
| Tipperary | 4 | West Tipperary | |
| Kerry | 5 | East Kerry | 14 |
| Kerry | 5 | Mid Kerry | 6 |
| Kerry | 5 | North Kerry | |
| Kerry | 5 | South Kerry | 16 |
| Kerry | 5 | West Kerry | 5 |
| Canada | 3 | Eastern Division | 8 |
| Canada | 3 | Toronto Division | 14 |
| Canada | 3 | Western Division | 18 |

== Europe ==
The continent of Europe has 5 provinces and 40 county boards:

=== Ireland ===
The island of Ireland has 4 provinces and 32 county boards (the historic four provinces of Ireland set in 1610):

==== Munster GAA ====
The province of Munster has 6 county boards:

The traditional hurling-football divide in Munster runs along a line from Tubber in north County Clare through Corofin to Labasheeda. Across the Shannon in County Limerick the line divides the footballing territory in the hilly west Limerick from the hurling territory in the lush lowlands of east and central Limerick. In County Cork the line also divides east from west, starting at Mallow and extending south towards the city of Cork and on to the coast. Further west beyond the footballing west Cork is the almost entirely footballing territory in County Kerry, with only a very small hurling region north of Tralee in Ardfert, Ballyheigue and Causeway. The entire counties of Tipperary and Waterford are considered to be traditionally hurling regions.

==== Leinster GAA ====
The province of Leinster has 12 county boards:

In Leinster the traditional hurling region is located in the south west of the province. The entire County Kilkenny is considered hurling territory, with very little football activity. Most of County Wexford is in the hurling region along with Counties Carlow, Laois and Offaly. The other Leinster counties are considered footballing counties.

==== Connacht GAA ====
The province of Connacht has 5 county boards:

Connacht is almost entirely Gaelic football territory, with only Galway competing in the Liam MacCarthy Cup. In County Galway the hurling-football divide follows a line from Galway City to Ballinasloe. The divide in Galway probably stands out more than in other counties. The hurling territory in Galway stands out strongly from the rest of the province; as a result, the Galway team plays in the Leinster Championship. Another very small hurling region is in eastern County Mayo around Ballyhaunis.

==== Ulster GAA ====
The province of Ulster has 9 county boards:

Ulster is also almost entirely a footballing region; the hurling region is located in the Glens of Antrim. and on the Ards Peninsula in eastern County Down.

=== Britain ===
The island of Britain has 1 province and 7 county boards:

==== British GAA ====
London enters a team in the All-Ireland Senior Football Championship via the Connacht Senior Football Championship.

Warwickshire has had some success in hurling at a junior level.

Lancashire fielded a team in the National Hurling League for the first time in 2018.

=== Gaelic Games Europe ===
This is the governing body in continental Europe.

German clubs formed a union in Berlin in 2015 known as the Deutscher Bund Gälischer Sportarten.

== North America ==
The continent of North America has 1 province and 3 county boards:

=== Canada ===
The Canadian GAA oversees Gaelic games across Canada.

=== United States ===
The New York GAA administrates in the New York metropolitan area. A county team participates in the All-Ireland Senior Football Championship via the Connacht Senior Football Championship, where it occasionally provides a challenge for opponents. Despite suffering the loss of two players to sendings off early in the second half, New York gave Galway a scare in 2010, though eventually capitulating by 2-13 to 0-12. A late burst in 2016 took New York to within one point of opponents Roscommon, which had contested the National Football League Division 1 semi-finals only one month earlier.

The USGAA oversees the rest of the country.

== Oceania ==
The continent of Oceania has 1 county board:

=== Australasia ===
The Australasia GAA oversees Gaelic games in Australia and New Zealand. It also oversees inter-state matches in Australia.

== Asia ==
The continent of Asia has 2 county boards:

=== Asian GAA ===
The Asian GAA oversees Gaelic games across Asia, but also Oceania (with the exception of Australia and New Zealand, which is overseen by the Australasian GAA).

=== Middle East GAA ===
The Middle Eastern Board of the Gaelic Athletic Association or Middle East GAA is one of the international county boards, and is responsible for organising Gaelic games in the Middle East.

== Links ==
- County (Gaelic games)
- Dual county

== See also ==
- Geography of association football
- Geography of Australian rules football
