= 2016 Etihad Airways GAA World Games =

Gaelic Athelitic Association global competition

- Dates: 9 August 2016 – 12 August 2016
- Sponsor: Etihad Airways

The 2016 Etihad Airways GAA World Games was a global competition of Gaelic football, hurling, and camogie run by the Gaelic Athletic Association (GAA), featuring teams from six continents. This was the 2nd GAA World Games and the first to be played in Ireland, with the first ever tournament played in Abu Dhabi the previous summer. The opening ceremony and throw in was held on August 6 at Croke Park, while the majority of the games were held at University College Dublin from 9 August to 11 August 2016, with the finals being played on Friday, 12 August 2016 at Croke Park.

The GAA's four main sports (men's Gaelic football), ladies' Gaelic football, hurling and camogie (women's version of hurling) were featured at the event. Each sport consisted of two separate tournaments: one for native players (born and raised in the country they are competing for) and one for Irish born players (born in Ireland before emigrating to whatever team they are playing for), creating a total of 8 separate competitions.

Each game has 9 players a side with 9 minutes a half. As the tournament progresses the game time increases to 12 minutes a half in the knockout and then 15 minutes a half in the shield, plate and final games. This is different to the usual game which has 15 players a side with 30 minutes a half. During the four days 254 games were played with the 8 finals being played in Croke Park. With the games at UCD having free entry

The games were not broadcast live but Irish language public broadcaster TG4 later broadcast highlights, features and interviews of the tournament in December that year. The program was also made available on TG4 Player, the broadcasters on demand streaming network. The opening and closing ceremonies were televised around the world.

== Teams ==
Over 1,100 competitors from 56 teams within 20 countries, stretching 6 continents took part in the event. Most of these competitors are Irish people living abroad, but up to a third of them are foreign born players. China and South Africa competed with completely non-Irish teams.

=== Africa ===
1. South Africa Gaels

=== Middle East ===
1. Abu Dhabi na Fianna
2. Middle East
3. Oman GAA

=== Asia ===
1. Beijing
2. Asia

=== Australia ===
1. Australasia

=== Europe ===
1. Britain
2. Brittany (France)
3. Croydon (London)
4. Europe
5. Fr. Murphy's (London)
6. France
7. Galicia (Spain)
8. Germany
9. Jersey
10. Parnells (London)
11. Tara (London)
12. Thomas McCurtains
13. Tir Chonail Gaels (London)

=== North America ===
1. Canada Eastern
2. Canada Toronto
3. Canada Western
4. NACB Chicago
5. NACB Eire Og San Francisco
6. New York
7. North America

=== South America ===
1. Argentina

== Format ==
=== Preliminary round robin ===
Teams were put into groups of 3 or 4 for the preliminary stage and played off in a double or single round-robin format respectively. The top team from each group of three and the top two from each group of four would go into the Cup play-offs on Wednesday while any team that did not qualify for the Cup play-offs would go into the Shield play-offs on Wednesday. The hurling competitions were the only exceptions, where there was only one group of three in both the native and Irish divisions, therefore there was no shield competition, and the top two from each of those groups went into the finals on Friday.

=== Wednesday Cup play-offs ===
In both ladies' football divisions, camogie and the men's football Irish division, there was only one Cup play-off group. The teams in it competed in a round-robin format with the top two going into the finals on Friday. Any team that did not finish in the top 2 went into the Plate play-offs on Thursday. Due to the large number of teams in the men's native football, there were two Cup play-off groups with the top team from each going into the final on Friday, all other teams to not qualify for the final went into the Plate play-offs on Thursday.

=== Wednesday Shield play-offs ===
Similar to the Cup Playoffs, the Shield play-offs were contested in a round-robin format with the top team in each group going into the Shield final on Thursday, any team that did not qualify for the Shield final went into the Plate Playoffs on Friday.

=== Friday Cup Finals ===
The Cup Finals were played on Friday, August 12 at Croke Park. Eight finals were played in total from going from 11AM to 5PM.

== Results ==
The results show are all the results for the camogie and men's native hurling games. Then also all the results of the finals.

== Camogie ==
=== Group A ===
9 August 2016 First round	Australasia	5-12 - 0-00	Thomas McCurtains	UCD

9 August 2016 First round	New York	4-05 - 0-05	Thomas McCurtains	UCD

9 August 2016 First round	Australasia	7-11 - 0-02	New York	UCD

9 August 2016 Second round	Australasia	3-10 - 0-01	Thomas McCurtains	UCD

9 August 2016 Second round	New York	0-12 - 2-01	Thomas McCurtains	UCD

9 August 2016 Second round	Australasia	2-08 - 0-02	New York	UCD

Key to colours
Advance to Cup play-offs
Advance to Shield play-offs

Team	Pld	W	D	L	Pts
Australasia	4	4	0	0	8
New York	4	2	0	2	4
Thomas McCurtains	4	0	0	4	0

=== Group B ===
9 August 2016 First round	Croydon	2-00 - 2-05	Tara	UCD

9 August 2016 First round	Europe	4-11 - 0-00	North America Native	UCD

9 August 2016 First round	Europe	2-06 - 1-02	Croydon	UCD

9 August 2016 First round	Tara	5-13 - 0-00	North America Native	UCD

9 August 2016 First round	Croydon	6-02 - 0-01	North America Native	UCD

9 August 2016 First round	Europe	3-04 - 0-05	Tara	UCD

Team	Pld	W	D	L	Pts
Europe	3	3	0	0	6
Tara	3	2	0	1	4
Croydon	3	1	0	2	2
North America Native	3	0	0	3	0

=== Group C ===
9 August 2016 First round	Canada Toronto	4-06 - 0-01	Fr. Murphy's	UCD

9 August 2016 First round	Middle East	6-08 - 0-00	Britain Native	UCD

9 August 2016 First round	Middle East	0-09 - 1-00	Fr. Murphy's	UCD

9 August 2016 First round	Canada Toronto	6-04 - 0-00	Britain Native	UCD

9 August 2016 First round	Fr. Murphy's	4-00 - 0-01	Britain Native	UCD

9 August 2016 First round	Middle East	2-04 - 0-00	Canada Toronto	UCD

Team	Pld	W	D	L	Pts
Middle East	3	3	0	0	6
Canada Toronto	3	2	0	1	4
Fr. Murphy's	3	1	0	2	2
Britain Native	3	0	0	3	0

=== Cup play-offs ===
10 August 2016 Cup play-off	Australasia	3-09 - 1-00	Europe	UCD

10 August 2016 Cup play-off	Middle East	1-05 - 0-01	Canada Toronto	UCD

10 August 2016 Cup play-off	Middle East	1-03 - 2-04	Tara	UCD

10 August 2016 Cup play-off	Canada Toronto	0-02 - 2-03	Europe	UCD

10 August 2016 Cup play-off	Europe	1-03 - 2-02	Tara	UCD

10 August 2016 Cup play-off	Australasia	4-08 - 0-00	Canada Toronto	UCD

10 August 2016 Cup play-off	Australasia	6-05 - 0-02	Middle East	UCD

10 August 2016 Cup play-off	Tara	2-08 - 0-01	Canada Toronto	UCD

10 August 2016 Cup play-off	Australasia	5-04 - 0-01	Tara	UCD

Key to colours
Advance to Cup Final
Advance to Shield Final
Advance to Plate play-offs

Team	Pld	W	D	L	Pts
Australasia	4	4	0	0	8
Tara	4	3	0	1	6
Middle East	4	2	0	2	4
Europe	4	1	0	3	2
Canada Toronto	4	0	0	4	0

==== Native Cup Final ====
12 August 2016 Native Cup Final	North America	1-04 - 0-04	Britain Native	Croke Park

==== Cup Final ====
12 August 2016 Cup Final	Australasia	5-17 - 1-08	Tara	Croke Park

=== Shield play-offs ===
10 August 2016 Shield play-off	New York	4-06 - 0-03	Thomas McCurtains	UCD

10 August 2016 Shield play-off	Croydon	4-04 - 0-00	Britain Native	UCD

10 August 2016 Shield play-off	North America Native	1-02 - 0-01	Fr. Murphy's	UCD

10 August 2016 Shield play-off	Croydon	2-05 - 0-00	North America Native	UCD

10 August 2016 Shield play-off	Britain Native	0-00 - 3-07	New York	UCD

10 August 2016 Shield play-off	Thomas McCurtains	4-06 - 0-00	Fr. Murphy's	UCD

10 August 2016 Shield play-off	Britain Native	3-01 - 1-02	North America Native	UCD

10 August 2016 Shield play-off	Thomas McCurtains	1-02 - 3-03	Croydon	UCD

10 August 2016 Shield play-off	New York	5-04 - 1-01	Fr. Murphy's	UCD

10 August 2016 Shield play-off	New York	3-07 - 0-02	North America Native	UCD

10 August 2016 Shield play-off	Fr. Murphy's	0-02 - 1-09	Croydon	UCD

10 August 2016 Shield play-off	Thomas McCurtain's	1-06 - 0-00	Britain Native	UCD

10 August 2016 Shield play-off	Fr. Murphy's	2-05 - 0-00	Britain Native	UCD

10 August 2016 Shield play-off	New York	2-05 - 1-04	Croydon	UCD

10 August 2016 Shield play-off	North America Native	0-04 - 1-02	Thomas McCurtains	UCD

Team	Pld	W	D	L	Pts
New York	5	5	0	0	10
Croydon	5	4	0	1	8
Thomas McCurtains	5	3	0	2	6
North America Native	5	1	0	4	2
Fr. Murphy's	5	1	0	4	2
Britain Native	5	1	0	4	2

==== Shield Final ====
11 August 2016 Shield Final	New York	4-03 - 3-05	Croydon	UCD

=== Plate play-offs ===
==== Quarter-finals ====
11 August 2016 Plate Quarter-final	Middle East	4-14 - 0-01	Britain Native	UCD

11 August 2016 Plate Quarter-final	Canada Toronto	2-11 - 0-01	North America Native	UCD

11 August 2016 Plate Quarter-final	Europe	1-10 - 1-00	Fr. Murphy's	UCD

==== Semi-finals ====
11 August 2016 Plate Semi-final	Middle East	2-07 - 0-04	Europe	UCD

11 August 2016 Plate Semi-final	Canada Toronto	2-07 - 0-04	Thomas McCurtain	UCD

==== Plate Final ====
11 August 2016 Plate Final	Middle East	1-07 - 2-03	Canada Toronto	UCD

== Hurling ==
=== Native ===
9 August 2016 First round	New York	6-09 - 0-01	Germany	UCD

9 August 2016 First round	New York	3-04 - 1-05	NACB Chicago	UCD

9 August 2016 First round	NACB Chicago	6-08 - 0-04	Germany	UCD

9 August 2016 First round	New York	5-07 - 1-01	Germany	UCD

9 August 2016 First round	New York	1-04 - 2-02	NACB Chicago	UCD

9 August 2016 First round	NACB Chicago	3-06 - 0-01	Germany	UCD

10 August 2016 First round	New York	7-08 - 1-01	Germany	UCD

10 August 2016 First round	New York	0-05 - 1-04	NACB Chicago	UCD

10 August 2016 First round	NACB Chicago	4-09 - 1-02	Germany	UCD

Key to colours
Advance to Cup Final

Team	Pld	W	D	L	Pts
NACB Chicago	6	5	0	1	10
New York	6	4	0	2	8
Germany	6	0	0	6	0

|

12 August 2016 Cup Final	New York	1-06 - 2-06	NACB Chicago	Croke Park

== All Final Cup Results ==
=== Camogie ===
==== Native Cup Final ====
12 August 2016 Native Cup Final	North America	1-04 - 0-04	Britain Native	Croke Park

==== Cup Final ====
12 August 2016 Cup Final	Australasia	5-17 - 1-08	Tara	Croke Park

=== Ladies Football ===
==== Native Cup Final ====
12 August 2016 Native Cup Final	New York	2-04 - 0-05	Eastern Canada	Croke Park

==== Cup Final ====
12 August 2016 Cup Final	Parnells	3-07 - 0-08	Australasia	Croke Park

=== Hurling ===
==== Native Cup Final ====
12 August 2016 NativeCup Final	Middle East	2-12 - 2-10	Australasia	Croke Park

==== Cup Final ====
12 August 2016 Cup Final	New York	1-06 - 2-06	NACB Chicago	Croke Park

=== Men's Football ===
==== Native Cup Final ====
12 August 2016 Native Cup Final	New York	4-05 - 1-09	France	Croke Park

==== Cup Final ====
12 August 2016 Cup Final	Middle East	1-12 - 1-11	Abu Dhabi	Croke Park
