= All-China Gaelic Games =

Gaelic games tournament in China

The All-China Gaelic games is a Gaelic games tournament held annually in China between club teams under the auspices of the Gaelic Athletic Association (GAA) and the Asian County Board (ACB). The Asian County Board of the Gaelic Athletic Association (GAA) is one of the county boards of the GAA, which is set up and running outside the island of Ireland. This county board is responsible for Gaelic games across the Asia-Pacific Region, other than Australia and New Zealand (which fall under the Australasia GAA board).

The annual tournament is a one-day event, with men's and ladies' teams competing in Gaelic football. The tournament is the mid-season highlight for mainland China's Gaelic Athletic Association Clubs. Exhibition games were also held under International (compromised) rules and hurling during the event.

== History ==
The All-China Games began in 2002 and feature GAA teams from across China, such as the Shanghai Gaelic Athletic Association, the Hong Kong Gaelic Athletic Association, and the Beijing Gaelic Athletic Association. After being cancelled in 2003 due to the outbreak of SARS, they returned in 2004.

In April 2012, the Beijing Gaelic Athletic Association decided to host the 2012 All-China Games as part of the 10th Anniversary celebration of Beijing GAA. Beijing GAA hosted the 2012 North Asian Games from June 8–10, 2012. It was the first year the previous All-Asia games were being expanded to include participants from across northern Asia. Beijing invited teams from various Chinese cities, such as Shanghai, Shenzhen, Dalian, and Suzhou, and for the first time, it also invited teams from Taiwan, Korea, and Japan.

== Participants ==
Teams sanctioned by the Asian GAA can participate in the competition. Chinese-based teams include Shanghai Gaelic Football Club, Beijing GAA, Shunde Gaels, Hefei Warriors, East China University of Technology (Nanchang) GAA, Hong Kong GAA, Dalian Wolfhounds, Shenzhen Celts,Suzhou Eire Og, and Canton Celts.

Participant players in the competition are primarily Irish diaspora, but they also draw participants from China and other countries who learn the sport. For example, players from 22 nations competed in the 2005 All-China Gaelic games.

The cumulative top competition winners to date are Shanghai (13) and Hong Kong (9).

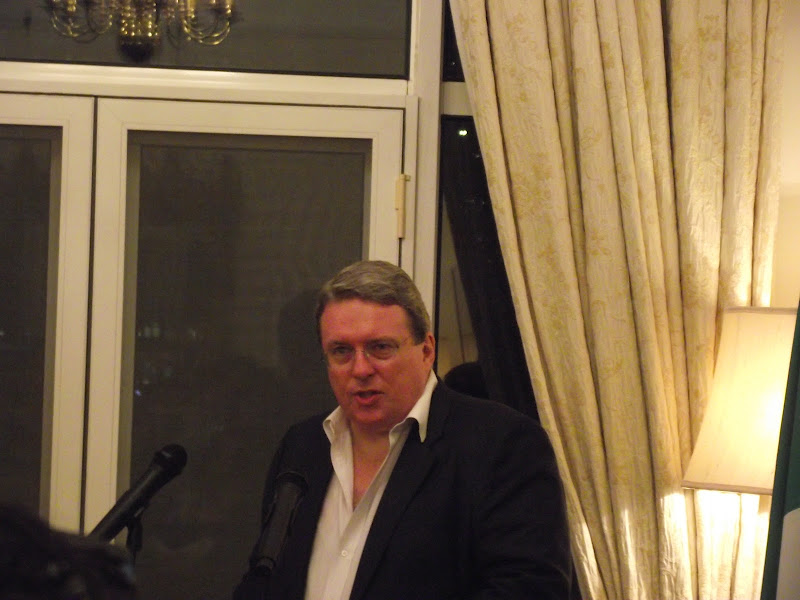
Declan Kelleher, Irish Ambassador to China, provided a reception to participants of the Beijing Games at the Irish embassy

== All China Games - A competition winners ==
Host location	Year	Men's A Cup	Ladies A Cup
Shanghai	2002	Hong Kong GAA	Shanghai Sirens
	2003	Cancelled due to SARS	
Shanghai	2004	Hong Kong GAA	Hong Kong GAA
Beijing	2005	Beijing GAA	Hong Kong GAA
Shenzhen	2006	Hong Kong GAA	Hong Kong GAA
Dalian	2007	Shanghai Saints	Beijing GAA
Beijing	2008	Shanghai Saints	Beijing GAA
Shanghai	2009	Hong Kong GAA	Shanghai Sirens
Shenzhen	2010	Hong Kong GAA	Shanghai Sirens
Shanghai	2011	Shanghai Saints	Shanghai Sirens
Beijing	2012	Seoul Gaels	Beijing GAA (A Team)
Beijing	2013	Shanghai Saints (A Team)	Shanghai Saints (A Team)
Shanghai	2014		Shanghai
Hong Kong	2015	Seoul Gaels	Hong Kong
Beijing	2016	Seoul Gaels	
Beijing	2017	Beijing	Hong Kong
Shanghai	2018	Shanghai	Hong Kong

== All China Games - Non-A competition winners ==
	Host location	Year	Men's Plate	Men's Bowl	Ladies Plate	Ladies Bowl
1	Shanghai	2002				
2		2003	Cancelled due to SARS			
3	Shanghai	2004				
4	Beijing	2005	Shenzhen Celts	Shanghai Saints		Shanghai Saints
5	Shenzhen	2006	Shanghai Saints			
5	Dalian	2007				Dalian / Shenzhen
7	Beijing	2008	Shenzhen Celts	Dalian Wolfhounds		
7	Shanghai	2009	Beijing GAA	Suzhou GAA	Hong Kong GAA	Shenzhen Celts
9	Shenzhen	2010	Suzhou Eire Og	Beijing GAA	Dalian Wolfhounds	Beijing GAA
10	Shanghai	2011	Shenzhen Celts	Beijing GAA	Dalian Wolfhounds	n/a
11	Beijing	2012	Shanghai B	Dalian Wolfhounds	Dalian/Suzhou	n/a
12	Beijing	2013	n/a	Dalian Wolfhounds	n/a	n/a
13	Shanghai	2014	XX	XX	Dalian	XX
