= Young Ireland Sydney =

Gaelic football club in Sydney, Australia

- Éire Óg
- Founded: 1969
- County: Australasia
- Division: New South Wales
- Nickname: The Green and Gold
- Colours: Green and gold
- Grounds: Princes Park, Auburn, Sydney

Young Ireland Sydney is a Gaelic football club located in the eastern suburbs of Sydney in New South Wales, Australia and is a member of New South Wales divisional board.

== Grounds ==
The club plays its matches at Ingleburn south of Sydney, New South Wales. In the summer months (January - March) the club base itself in Queens Park in the eastern suburbs.

== History ==
Set-up in 1969, the club took to the field and contested in competition - narrowly missing out on silverware in its first year. In 1970 however, the club took home the championship trophy. As a result of this win Young Ireland were rewarded with the chance to represent the New South Wales GAA in the Australian inter-state competition. The club recorded a 6-point win against another Young Ireland of Melbourne in Wagga Wagga.

In 1989, Young Ireland became the first Gaelic football team to have a sponsor's name on its jerseys, when Mike Hughes Finance became sponsors.

In 1990, the club was invited to take part in an exhibition game against Wolfetones of Melbourne as the curtain-raiser to the Ireland v's Australia International Rules match.

The New South Wales Gaelic Athletic Association has named its three main trophy's in honour of deceased club members. Namely: Seamus Dowling (Championship), Tom Kearney (League) and James McGirr (Inter Provincial).

=== Roll of Honour ===
- Championship 1970, 1978, 1980, 1981,1984, 1988, 1990, 1991, 1993, 1994,1998, 1999, 2001, 2002, 2003, 2005, 2006, 2007, 2009
- League 1970, 1983, 1984, 1987, 1989, 1990, 1991, 1992, 1993, 1995, 1996, 2000, 2002, 2004, 2007, 2017

== Club crest ==
In 2006, to mark the club's 37th year of continuous participation in the competitions and celebrate being the longest running club in New South Wales Gaelic league, the club commissioned the design of a club crest.

The crest is of a Gaelic football which sits on a map of Ireland which in turn sits on a map of Australia. The background image is of a traditional celtic cross with a round border. The writing in the border is Young Ireland Sydney Australia with 1969 the year of the club's founding. On the side are the letters NSW GAA to signify the club's state of origin.

== See also ==
- List of footballers (Gaelic football)
- Ladies' Gaelic football
- List of Gaelic football clubs
- Sport in Ireland
- Sport in Australia
