= Ottawa Gaels =

Gaelic Athletic Association club in Ottawa, Canada

- Founded: 1975
- County: Toronto
- Colours: Maroon and white
- Grounds: Rideau Carleton Raceway, Ottawa, Ontario
Home kit

The Ottawa Gaels GAA club is a Gaelic Athletic Association club in Ottawa, Canada. It is involved in the promotion and development of Gaelic football in the region. The club, which was established in 1975, fields teams in both men's and ladies senior competitions organised by the Toronto GAA division of Gaelic Games Canada. In the Toronto GAA leagues, the Ottawa Gaels club competes against other teams from Toronto, Ottawa, and Montreal.
