= Football in Tasmania =

Football in Tasmania can refer to a number of sports played in Tasmania, Australia:

== Major codes of football in Tasmania ==
- Australian rules football in Tasmania
- Soccer in Tasmania

== Minor codes in Tasmania ==
- Tasmanian Rugby Union
- Rugby league in Tasmania
- Tasmanian Gaelic Football and Hurling Association

== See also ==
- Sport in Tasmania
