= Football in New South Wales =

There are numerous codes of football in New South Wales, Australia:

The code most commonly referred to as football in New South Wales is rugby league, other codes are also known as football on a national and international basis.

- For Rugby league football see Rugby league in New South Wales. The main organising body is the New South Wales Rugby League.
- For Rugby union football see the main organising body, the New South Wales Rugby Union.
- For Association football see Association football in New South Wales. The main organising body is Football NSW.
- For Australian rules football see Australian rules football in New South Wales.
- For Gaelic Football see the main organising body the New South Wales GAA.
