= Singapore Polo Club =

Sports center in Singapore

Singapore Grounds
- The Club
- Interactive map of Singapore Grounds
- Location: 80 Mount Pleasant Road; 298334; Singapore
- Executive suites: 20
- Surface: Desso GrassMaster

Construction
- Groundbreaking: 1914
- Opened: 1941
- Renovated: 1941

Tenant
- Singapore Polo Club

The Singapore Grounds, or better known as Singapore Polo Club, is a varied sports centre in Singapore. It is one of the oldest grounds in Singapore.

== History ==
Polo was introduced to Singapore by officers of the King's Own Royal Regiment who were stationed on the island. The Singapore Polo Club was founded in 1886, making it the oldest polo team in what was once British Malaya and one of the oldest sporting and social clubs in Singapore. From its formation until 1914, it played at the Race Course, a major sports venue up until the 1930s, in present-day Farrer Park.

== Grounds ==
The Singapore Polo Club was located at Balestier Road since 1914, but moved to Mount Pleasant for needs of better facilities. After numerous fundraising attempts, the grounds were finally founded by Singapore Turf Club, on the condition that they use it as a practice and recreational grounds and had status of it. The Japanese Imperial Army sent volunteers to collaborate in the attempts of a national identity, and the ground was complete and open for play by 1941.

However, during The Second World War, the ground was used as a gun emplacement area by the Japanese Defence Force and was rented as a squatters camp by the Salvation Army and Japanese Defence Forces. After the war, Lord Mountbatten became the patron of the ground and re-established the Polo Club. He used his British and Royal influence to renovate the Grounds and establish it as an improved playing area, with a newly renovated pitch.

The grounds are also the headquarters of the Asian Gaelic Athletics Association, or the Asian GAA.

=== Pitch ===
A new type of grass called Desso GrassMaster was installed in 2000 to improve to surface's quality. The grass, which is natural grass with enhanced artificial roots, is suitable for polo, Gaelic football and hurling, as well as the other sports played there.

=== Facilities ===
The ground also has a number of suites and other activities. There is a bar and restaurant, riding area, gym, spa, Jacuzzi, swimming pool, as well as two tennis courts and the pitch. As of 2023, members can rent rooms at the Club to stay in.

== See also ==
- Gaelic games
- International rules football
- List of Gaelic Athletic Association stadiums
