= Western Canadian Championship (Gaelic football) =

The Western Canadian Championship, is a Gaelic football championship tournament of the Western Divisional Board of the Gaelic Athletic Association, played every year in British Columbia and Alberta, Canada. The championship includes Men's and Ladies' Gaelic football, two of the sports which make up Gaelic games.

The Trophy for the men's division is called the Tom Butler Cup, and the corresponding women's trophy is the Tim Gibbon Cup. Information on the internet about the championships post 2018 is scarce.

== History ==
In 2004, the first formal GAA sanctioned Western Canadian Championships were played. The Divisional Board, in order to facilitate tournaments that include unaffiliated teams (i.e. not in the Western Divisional Board), and to allow each teams host critical games (understanding the travel distances between venues), agreed that the Championship would be played out in a League format. Each member team would play each other team twice, over two tournaments. The venue for Championship games would be rotated so that each team is required to cross the Rockies only once each year. Only the 5 member clubs (5 men's & 3 ladies' teams) compete in this Championship.

The Edmonton Wolf Tones would win the first 3 ladies championships, whilst the Calgary Chieftains won the 2004 men's title, and the Vancouver Harps won the 2005 and 06 men's titles. These three clubs would split the championships amongst themselves for the next 10 or so years, before a 4th club won their first cup, with the Fraser Valley Gaels winning the men's cup in 2016 and 2018.

== Roll of honour ==
#	Team	Mens wins	Ladies wins
1	Vancouver Harps/ISSC	6	7
2	Edmonton Wolfe Tones	4	4
3	Calgary Chieftains	2	1
4	Fraser Valley Gaels	2	0

=== By year ===
Season	Ladies	Men's
2018		Fraser Valley Gaels
2017		
2016	Chieftains	Fraser Valley Gaels
2015	Harps	Harps
2014	Harps	Wolfe Tones
2013	Harps	Wolfe Tones
2012	Harps	Wolfe Tones
2011	Wolfe Tones	Harps
2010	Harps	Harps
2009	Harps	Wolfe Tones
2008	Harps	Harps
2007	Harps	Chieftains
2006	Wolfe Tones	Harps
2005	Wolfe Tones	Harps
2004	Wolfe Tones	Chieftains
