= Queensland Gaelic Football and Hurling Association =

Queensland GAA
- Nickname(s): Maroons
- Founded: 1973
- Dominant sport: Dual county
- Ground(s): Gaelic Park, Willawong
- County colours: Maroon and white

County teams
- Hurling Championship: Emeralds
- Ladies' Gaelic football: East Celts
- Camogie: Emeralds

Regular kit

Queensland Gaelic Football and Hurling Association (QGFHA) was established in 1975. It is the ruling body for Gaelic football and hurling in the Australian state of Queensland. The QGFHA is affiliated to the Australasia GAA.

The QGFHA runs men's and ladies' football matches and hurling and camogie matches at Gaelic Park in Willawong.

State representative teams are sent to the Australasian Championships every year with men's senior and minors, and women's teams, competing.

== Clubs ==
Gaelic football

- Harps
- East Celts
- John Mitchel's
- Souths
- Gold Coast Gaels
- Shamrocks
- Cairns Chieftains

Hurling & Camogie

- Na Fianna
- Emeralds
- Gold Coast Gaels

Other Clubs

- Brisbane Youths
- Queensland Masters (Over 35’s)
