= Chicago Patriots Gaelic Football Club =

American Gaelic Athletic Association

Chicago Patriots
- Founded: 2005; 20 years ago
- County: North America
- Division: Central Division Board
- Nickname: Patriots
- Colours
- Grounds: Gaelic Park, Chicago

Chicago Patriots Gaelic Football Club is a Gaelic Athletic Association in Chicago, US. The Patriots were formed by longtime Chicago GAA supporter Joseph Begley in the spring of 2005. This new team was formed to compete as an all-American-born team in the North American finals in the Junior C competition.
