= Montreal Shamrocks GAC =

Sports club in Canada

- Founded: 1948
- County: Canada
- Division: Quebec
- Nickname: Shamrocks / Na Seamróga
- Colours: Green and White
Home kit

The Montreal Shamrocks GAC is a sports club in Montreal, Canada, associated with the Gaelic Athletic Association in Ireland. The club operates under the Canadian GAA board in the Eastern Canada division.

The Montreal Shamrocks GAC was established in 1948 to promote the Irish sports of Gaelic football and hurling to the community of Montreal.

== History ==
=== Origins ===
Since the foundation of the Gaelic Athletic Association (GAA) in 1884, and even prior to that, there is archival evidence that Gaelic football was played in Montreal. However there is more concrete evidence that, from 1945 and onwards, Irish immigrants gave exhibitions of their native games at Fletcher Fields and at the old MAA grounds.

In 1948, the Montreal branch of the GAA was officially convened under the presidency of Martin Greene. Greene applied for, and the next year received, official approbation from the president of the GAA in Dublin.

Subsequently, the American County Board of the GAA was established to include Montreal and Toronto in separate divisions. Division IV saw Montreal in competition with teams from Buffalo, Rochester and Syracuse. Both Montreal and Toronto fared well in international competition as the cities were equally enriched by an influx of young Irish immigrants.

=== 1950s and 1960s ===
In the early 1950s, the Montreal GAA, which had adopted the name of 'Montreal Shamrock Hurling and Football Club', formed an inter-squad league which consisted of five teams in hurling and four teams in football. In this period, the Montreal Hurling team won the American Senior Championship against Boston GAA, while on the same day at Loyola Park in Montreal, the Montreal Football team narrowly lost to Boston Galway in the final.

In May 1965, the Shamrocks Football team played host to a visiting Australian Rules Football Team from Melbourne, playing the first half under GAA rules, and the 2nd half under Australian Rules. The final score was Montreal 29 - Melbourne 28. On St Helen's Island Park, at the World Fair of Expo '67, the hurling team defeated the visiting New York-Kilkenny Champions.

On 29 October 1969, Montreal GAA entertained the Kerry Senior Football Team, All-Ireland Champions, who were on their way home from an American tour.

=== 1970s ===
On 8 October 1973, the Shamrocks Hurling team captured the American League title against Cleveland. In August 1974, the Shamrocks Football team played host to an Irish Civil Service Football Team at Trenholme Park. This was the first time that a visiting Gaelic football team from Ireland played in Montreal. Much publicity was given to that game by the media and several hundred spectators watched an exhibition of Gaelic football under floodlights. The Irish squad was victorious over their hosts.

From the mid-1970s, however, Montreal was not attracting as many young Irish immigrants as Toronto, Boston and Chicago. Accordingly, the club was forced to rely on ageing veterans, and their up-and-coming sons. Competition against the traditional rivals from Buffalo, Rochester and Syracuse (teams affected by the Vietnam War draft) had to be abandoned in favour of games against Canadian teams from Toronto, Ottawa and Hamilton.

=== 1980s and 1990s ===
To commemorate the 35th anniversary of the club, a two-day gala celebration was held featuring games of both football and hurling, culminating in a reception on 18 August 1984. A citation from the President of the GAA in Ireland, Paddy Buggy, was presented and read at the banquet.

On the occasion of his visit to Montreal on 24 January 1999, the then President of the GAA, Joe McDonagh, addressed more than a hundred Montreal GAA club members and guests at a gala banquet.

=== 2000s ===
Gaelic football has consistently been played throughout the years. In the 200s, the football team successfully defended their Quebec Cup title, defeating provincial rival Quebec City on October 31 to retain the cup. It marked the third time in the preceding four year that the Shamrocks won top honours in the province. There is also an active Women's Football team.

The hurling team made a re-appearance after a roughly 35-year lay-off at a tournament in October 2009, hosted by the Portland (Maine) Marauders GAA Hurling club, and joined by the Barley House Wolves of Concord, NH.

Montreal host a 9-a-side GAA tournament in May each year in St.Julie, Quebec. Participants include teams from Halifax, Quebec City, Ottawa, Montreal and Toronto. The team also compete at the Great American Irish Festival each year in Utica, New York against teams like Albany, Rochester, Syracuse, Buffalo and Mason Dixon.

=== 2010s ===
In 2012, the Montreal Shamrocks established its first Superleague along with its first 3 teams to join. The Griffintown Gaels, The Goose Village Blackrocks and The Verdun Vikings. In 2014, the Shamrocks won the first Eastern Canada GAA Finals (Gaelic Football) in St.John`s, Newfoundland.

In 2017, the Winter Superleague had a new independent team debut (The Concordia Warriors) bringing the total of Superleague teams for the winter season to 4. Co-ed Hurling also made its debut during the Winter Superleague, team name were later selected during the Summer Superleague. In June 2017, the first co-ed hurling summer Superleague game took place at College Letendre between Na Fianna Rouges (7-8) & PSC Cu Chulainn (8-8). The St-Henri Harps was the 3rd team created who went on to play their first game on June 26, 2017.

In September 2017, in Ottawa Ontario during the Eastern Canadian Championships, Montreal claimed their 2nd ECGAA Senior football title against the Ottawa Gaels and also claimed their first ECGAA Senior Hurling title against Ottawa Eire Óg. October 2017, for the first time a game was played in Trois-Rivieres Quebec in an effort to promote the sport and hopefully establish a team in that city. In a close fought battle, Montreal came out victorious with the Quebec cup.

In May 2018, during the club's 70th anniversary, the Montreal Shamrocks created the Hall of Shamrocks to recognize and remember the work put in by retired members.

The first competitive camogie tournament took place May 19, 2018 at St-Julie field during the annual Montreal May tournament, 5 clubs were present along with special guest referee Seán Óg Ó hAilpín. Toronto Camogie Club came out victorious on this historical day. Later that day, The Montreal Shamrocks Senior Men's football team also made history by defeating Toronto in the finals to win their own tournament for the first time since its creation.

September 1, 2018 in Charlettown P.E.I. during the Eastern Canadian Championships, the Montreal camogie team along with the assistance of 2 Halifax camogie players battled against a joint team of Ottawa Eire Óg & P.E.I. players. This marked the first time Camogie was part of the ECGAA championships. At the end of the day the joint team of Montreal Shamrocks and Halifax also known as the self proclaimed 'Halishams` won the inaugural cup. The Montreal men's senior football team played the Quebec City Patriots, which required extra time to decide a winner. Ultimately Montreal won their 2nd senior Championship in a row. The men's junior team also went home with a championship as they won their first ECGAA junior football title against the Halifax Gaels.

July 29, 2019, 34 Montreal Shamrocks were selected to represent Canada in the GAA World Games in men's football (5 players), women's football (13 players), hurling (6 players) and camogie (10 players). The largest delegate from a club in Canada. The tournament was hosted in Waterford, Ireland.

On August 31, 2019, at Complexe Multi-Sports De Laval, the Montreal Shamrocks hosted the ECGAA Championships for the first time. The men's football team secured a 3rd senior championship in a row vs the Ottawa Gaels while the ladies' football won their first ECGAA senior title vs the Ottawa Gaels. Montreal submitted 2 men's football teams and 3 ladies teams.

== Roll of honor ==
=== Men's Football ===
1959 North American Senior football Champions

2006 Quebec Football Champions

2008 Quebec Football Champions

2009 Quebec Football Champions

2010 Quebec Football Champions

2011 Quebec Football Champions

2012 Quebec Football Champions

2013 Quebec Football Champions

2014 Eastern Canada GAA Senior Champions

2014 Quebec Football Champions

2015 Quebec Football Champions

2016 Quebec Football Champions (Represented by Superleague team Verdun Vikings)

2017 Eastern Canada GAA Senior Champions

2017 Quebec Football Champions

2018 Montreal May Tournament Senior Champions

2018 Eastern Canada GAA Junior Champions

2018 Eastern Canada GAA Senior Champions

2019 Eastern Canada GAA Senior Champions

=== Ladies Football ===
2019 Eastern Canada GAA Champions

=== Hurling ===
1961 North American Senior Hurling Champions

1973 North American Junior Hurling Champions

2017 Eastern Canada GAA Senior Champions

=== Camogie ===
2018 Eastern Canada GAA Champions

2019 Heritage Cup Champions
