= San Antonio Gaelic Athletic Club =

Gaelic football club in San Antonio

- Cumann Lúthchleas Gael Naomh Antaine
- Founded: 2011
- County: San Antonio

San Antonio Gaelic Athletic Club (Irish: Cumann Lúthchleas Gael Naomh Antaine) known as The San Patricios is a Gaelic Athletic Association club in San Antonio, Texas and a member of the North American GAA since 2012. Currently the club has a men's Gaelic Football team, and a ladies' football team. Their club badge features the Alamo, as well as the San Antonio Riverwalk. The SAGAC is registered with the State of Texas as a Domestic Nonprofit Corporation.

== History ==
San Antonio Gaelic Athletic Club (Cumann Lúthchleas Gael Naomh Antaine), or the San Patricios was formed in San Antonio, Texas in 2011.

San Antonio Gaelic Athletic Club Kit

== Uniform ==
The team kit is taken directly from the sky blue found on two of the earliest Texas flags of independence: “Texas and Liberty” was inscribed on one side and a Latin inscription “Ubi, libertas habitat, ibi nostra patria est” (“Where liberty dwells, there is my country”) was also inscribed on the other.

The green found on the jersey represents the country that created Gaelic football, Ireland.

== Sponsors ==
The Executive Clud sponsor of the SAGAC is the Lion and Rose Restaurant and Pub. GLI the distributor of Guinness and Harp Lager have become major sponsors as of fall 2012

The Irish Cultural Society of San Antonio, Ancient Order of Hibernians Columkille Division 1, and The Harp & Shamrock Society of Texas, all San Antonio Irish organizations have all been long time supporters and partners of the SAGAC. This year (2014), that will be commemorated as their crests will be added the 2014 SAGAC San Patricio Jerseys.

== Pub League ==
In September 2011 the Lion and Rose Restaurant and Pub officially announced its decision to become the Sponsor of the SAGAC Pub League. The SAGAC had made plans to follow in the footsteps of the Dallas GAA Team, "Fionn McCumhaill's Gaa Dallas" by creating a Pub League to help promote the Gaelic Football and increase the amount of competitive play time for each member. The SAGAC announced that the two teams of the inaugural Pub League would be named "The San Patricios" (named after the St. Patrick's Battalion of the Mexican American War) and the "Irish Citizen Army" named after James Connolly's Socialist Revolutionaries.

== Active Roster ==
As of February 2014, the SAGAC has 58 men & women on their active roster (those who have played in either a National Tournament, Texas League or Pub League game). The Club is managed by Adrian Brett.

No.	Player	Position	Club
1	Jerome Austin	Mid Field	West Plains, MO
2	Mono Aguilar	Half back	San Antonio, TX
3	Jason Binkley	Full forward	Fayetteville, NC
4	Adrian Brett	Half forward	Cloonacool, Co. Sligo, Ireland
5	Daniel "Chris" Brown	Goal Keeper	Wheeling, WV
6	Betty Bowman	Half forward	Indianapolis, IN
7	Gabe Castro	Full forward	Cibolo, TX
8	Mike Castro	Half back	San Antonio, TX
9	Brian Clark (O'Cleirigh)	Corner Back	Shawnee, OK (Co. Cork/Co. Galway)
10	Andy Claughton	Corner Back	Corpus Christi, TX
11	Keith Connolly	Full forward	Hawthorne, NY
12	Brendan Cullinane	Full forward	Beltsville, MD
13	Michael Cunningham	Full forward
14	Will Damron	Half forward	San Antonio, TX
15	Clive Davidson	Mid Field	Skerries, Co. Dublin, Ireland
16	Jeff Davis	Half back	San Antonio, TX
17	Thomas Deegan	Mid Field	Templemore, Co. Tipperary, Ireland
18	Mike Dirksen Jr.	Mid Field	San Antonio, TX
19	Laura Domyancic	Full forward	Okinawa & Misawa, Japan / San Antonio, TX
20	CJ Eschlinger	Corner Back	Wichita, KS
21	Jason Gray	Half forward	New Orleans, LA
22	Carlos Hernandez	Corner Back	San Antonio, TX
23	Brad Hickey	Mid Field	San Antonio, TX
24	Sean J. Hipp	Full back	Philadelphia, PA
25	Josh Hunt	Mid Field	O'Brien, TX
26	Phil Johnston	Full forward	Decatur, IL
27	Jeff Justice	Mid Field	San Antonio, TX
28	Chris King	Half forward	San Antonio, TX
29	Robert McDaniel		San Antonio, TX
30	Daryl Mcghiey	Half forward	San Antonio, TX

No.	Player	Position	Club
31	Jon Mcghiey	Corner Back	San Antonio, TX
32	Kevin McManus	Half forward	Portaferry, Co. Down, Northern Ireland
33	Shane Mullane	Half forward	Newcastle West, Co. Limerick, Ireland
34	Marian Nagle	Corner Back	Rosscarbery, Co. Cork, Ireland
35	Lucky Nichols	Goal Keeper	San Antonio, TX
36	Terri Nichols	Half forward	San Antonio, TX
37	Michael O'Brien
38	Jimmy O'Halligan	Corner Back	Houston, TX
39	David O'Keefe	Half forward	Effin, Co. Limerick, Ireland
40	Rick Ortiz	Corner Back	San Antonio, TX
41	Tim O'Sullivan	Full back	Bronx, NY
42	Jacobo Paz	Goal Keeper	San Pedro Sula, Honduras
43	Michael Patrick	Corner Back	San Antonio, TX
44	Erin Perez	Corner Back	San Antonio, TX
45	Gabe Perez	Corner Back	San Antonio, TX
46	Juan Pina	Full forward
47	Stevie Quinn	Half forward	Cookstown, Co. Tyrone, Northern Ireland
48	Scott Rankin	Half back	Tehachapi, CA
49	Christian Sanchez	Full forward	Mexico City, Mexico
50	Matt Scott	Half forward	Cibolo, TX
51	Gerry Sheridan	Half forward	Oldcastle, Co. Meath, Ireland
52	JT Thompson	Half back	Lubbock, TX
53	Katie Thompson	Half forward	Paint Creek, TX
54	Chris Thompson	Mid Field	San Antonio, TX
55	Tyler Tully	Corner Back	Moore, OK
56	Mario Villanueva	Half back	Monterrey, Mexico / San Antonio, TX
57	Daniel White	Full forward	San Antonio, TX
58	Rob Wilson	Half forward	San Antonio, TX
