= Singapore Gaelic Lions =

- Leoin Gaelacha Singapura
- Founded: 1997
- County: Asia
- Colours: Red and Yellow

Senior Club Championships
| | All Ireland | South Asia champions | Asia champions |
|---|---|---|---|
| Football: | - | 10 | 9 |
| Ladies' football: | - | 1 | 11 |

The Singapore Gaelic Lions is a Gaelic football club in Singapore. It is established in 1997 and considered one of the strongest Gaelic football clubs in Southeast Asia.

The club won the Bill Nikolopoulos Cup 2009. The club participated in the 2008 Asian Gaelic Games held in Penang, Malaysia. The club won the 2nd KL Challenge Trophy organised by Orang Eire.

The club hosted the 12th Asian Games in 2007, with clubs from across the continent competing to become Asian Champions.

== Record ==
SEA Gaelic Games

- 2008 - Champions
- 2009 - Champions
- 2010 - Champions
- 2011 - Champions

== Notable players ==
=== Senior inter-county ladies' footballers ===
Dublin

- Rachel Ruddy
