= Rachel Ruddy =

Dublin dual Gaelic football/camogie player

Personal information
- Native name: Rachel Ní Rodaigh (Irish)
- Born: c. 1988 (age 37–38)
- Occupation: Physiotherapist
- Height: 5 ft 8 in (1.73 m)

Sport
- Sport: Ladies' Gaelic football Camogie
- Position: Left Corner Back
Clubs
- Years: Club
- 1994– 200x–2010 2010–2012: Ballyboden St Enda's → Dublin University GAA → Singapore Gaelic Lions
Inter-county
- Years: County
- 200x– 2010–: Dublin (camogie); Dublin (football)
Inter-county titles
- All-Irelands: 3
- All Stars: 2

Rachel Ruddy is a senior Dublin ladies' footballer. She was a member of the Dublin teams that won the All-Ireland Senior Ladies' Football Championship in 2010, 2017 and 2019. In 2017 she received her second All Star award. Ruddy has also played for the Dublin senior camogie team.

== Early years, family and education ==
Ruddy is the daughter of Vivian Ruddy, a former Ballyboden Wanderers Gaelic footballer who originally came from Achill Island. Her sister, Ciara Ruddy, has also played for the Dublin senior ladies' football team. Ruddy graduated in physiotherapy from Trinity College Dublin.

== Playing career ==
=== Clubs ===
Ballyboden St Enda's

Ruddy has won senior Leinster and Dublin camogie championships with Ballyboden St Enda's. Between 2010 and 2014 she helped the club complete a five in a row of Dublin titles. Her teammates at Ballyboden included Emer Lucey, Ciara Lucey and her sister, Ciara Ruddy. Ruddy was also a member of the Ballyboden team that won the 2010 Dublin Ladies' Senior Football Championship. She also played for Ballyboden in the 2017 Dublin final.

Dublin University GAA

While attending Trinity College Dublin, Ruddy played camogie for Dublin University GAA.

Singapore Gaelic Lions

While working as a physiotherapist in Singapore, Ruddy played for Singapore Gaelic Lions.

=== Inter-county ===
==== Ladies' Gaelic football ====
Ruddy made her senior inter-county debut for Dublin in 2010 against Laois. She was a member of the Dublin team that won the 2010 All-Ireland Senior Ladies' Football Championship final. In 2010 she also won her first All Star. She also played in the 2014 final against Cork but missed the 2015 and 2016 finals because of a back injury. She was subsequently a member of the Dublin teams that won the 2017, and 2019 All-Ireland finals. In 2017 Ruddy won her second All Star.

	All-Ireland Finals	Place	Opponent	Goal/Points
1	2010	Winners	Tyrone	0–2
2	2014	Runner up	Cork	0–3
3	2017	Winners	Mayo	0–0
4	2019	Winners	Galway	0–1

==== Camogie ====
Ruddy has also played for the Dublin senior camogie team. In 2008 she was nominated for an All-Star.

== Personal life ==
Ruddy works as a physiotherapist at Our Lady's Children's Hospital, Crumlin. It is a tradition that All-Ireland champions visit this hospital after the final. In September 2019 Ruddy hosted her Dublin teammates during their visit. On 19 October 2019 Ruddy married Seamus Conboy in Ravello, Italy.

== Honours ==
=== Ladies' Gaelic football ===
Dublin

- All-Ireland Senior Ladies' Football Championship
  - Winners: 2010, 2017, 2019: 3
  - Runner up: 2014 1

Ballyboden St Enda's

- Dublin Ladies' Senior Football Championship
  - Winners: 2010:
  - Runner up: 2017

Individual

- All Stars
  - Winner: 2010, 2017 : 2

=== Camogie ===
Ballyboden St Enda's

- Leinster Senior Club Camogie Championship
  - Winners: 2008
- Dublin Senior Club Camogie Championships
  - Winners: 2006, 2008, 2010, 2011, 2012, 2013, 2014
