= Australasia GAA =

Sporting body

- Dominant sport: Gaelic football
- County colours: Green and gold

The Australasia County Board of the Gaelic Athletic Association (GAA), or Australasian GAA, or Gaelic Football & Hurling Association of Australasia is one of the county boards of the GAA outside Ireland, and is responsible for Gaelic games all across Australasia. It is also responsible for Australasian inter-state matches, primarily conducted in an annual weeklong tournament. The association is made up of the Australian state associations of New South Wales, Queensland, South Australia, Tasmania, Victoria and Western Australia, and the New Zealand associations of Wellington and Canterbury.

== History ==
=== Gaelic football in Australia ===
In 1840, in Sydney's Hyde Park, games of Hurling and Football were played by Irishmen. During Adelaide's St Patrick's Day celebrations in 1843, families native to Ireland played a football game "in genuine Irish style". The game started at 2pm and was played in honour of Saint Patrick. In 1846, there was controversy when an Irish gathering sought to "play an old Irish game" in Sydney's Hyde Park.

In 1859, there were mentions of arrangements to celebrate "Gaelic games" in Geelong.

In 1864, an article in the Freeman's Journal of Sydney wrote about celebrating a holiday by renewing "some of our old national customs, our old manly games and exercises, hurling [and] football".

In 1887, the Freeman's Journal in Sydney, a Catholic publication, printed the GAA's revised rules for Irish football.

=== Hurling in Australia ===
In December 1860, a hurling match was played in the state of Victoria, an event which attracted a large attendance of Irishmen.

=== Early governing bodies ===
The first Australian GAA was formed in Auckland, New Zealand, in 1953. Victoria's GAA was formed in 1956, followed by New South Wales. This was followed in 1963 by the formation of a South Australian association and associations in Western Australia and Queensland soon after.

The first interstate championships in both codes were played between NSW, Victoria and South Australia in 1971.

In Sydney in 1974 representatives of state associations met and agreed to form the Gaelic Athletic Association of Australia to administer and promote Gaelic football and hurling on a national level. Subsequently, the Gaelic Athletic Association of Australia joined with the New Zealand associations of Auckland and Wellington to form the Gaelic Athletic Association of Australasia.

== State associations ==
=== Australia ===
- New South Wales
- Queensland
- South Australia
- Tasmania
- Victoria
- Western Australia

=== New Zealand ===
- Wellington
- Canterbury
- Auckland

== Australasian championships ==
The Australasian Championships, commonly referred to as the Australasian Games, are a week-long tournament staged annually in September/October each year and hosted by one of the member state associations. Tournaments typically feature all codes, with hurling played for the first time as part of a championships held in New Zealand in Wellington in 2015, and camogie added full-time in 2012.

In most circumstances, there is only one side per state per code, but when numbers are low in a code (typically hurling) or in the number of states entered (usually when the tournament is in Western Australia or New Zealand) exceptions to this are made.

The tournament format in each code varies year-to-year depending on the number of entries, but generally involves either a round-robin or pool play format with either two semi-finals or one semi-final with the top qualifier progressing directly to the final. A final is played in each code to determine the champion for the year.

Each association is permitted to name a panel of 22 players in each code for the championships, with unlimited interchange rather than the more traditional substitution rule used for each match. In recent years, a 'visa' rule was introduced to encourage states to develop their own players. This rule limits the number of players any state may select in any code who are not either Australians or New Zealanders, or have obtained residency in either country.

== International honours ==
The Australasia Ladies' football team have won three Women's World Cup competitions (the tournament does not include Irish sides) in 2000, 2002 and 2005.

== See also ==
- Geography of Gaelic games
- Organisation of sport in Australia
- Sport in New Zealand
- County (Gaelic games)
