= Gaelic Football and Hurling Association of South Australia =

South Australia

The Gaelic Football and Hurling Association of South Australia (GFHASA) was established in 1967. It is the ruling body for Gaelic football and Hurling in the Australian state of South Australia. The GFHASA is affiliated to the Australasia GAA.

The GFHASA runs both Men's and Women's Football matches over the summer at St Mary's Park. The competition was previously played over winter, however clashes with other sports deemed it necessary to move to a summer competition to attract more players.

State Representative Teams are sent to the Australasian Championships every year with Men's senior and Minors and Women's Teams competing.

== Clubs ==
- Angry Leprechauns
- Backyarders
- Blacks Boys
- Blue Baggers
- Boagan's Heroes
- Dirty Dozen
- Eastern Gaels
- Éire We Go
- Flinders O'Neills
- Irish Australians
- Irish Australians Cougars
- Irish Australians Rovers
- Mitchell Park
- Na Fianna
- North Eastern Gaels
- Northern Gunners
- Onkaparinga
- Parkies
- POWA
- Red Army
- Red Lions
- Setanta
- Shenanigans
- Shin Boners
- Saint Brendan's GFC
- Steve Irwin All Stars
- Team Hoff
- The Lions
- The Royals
- The Surps
- The Titans
- TTG Units
- UNISA crusaders
- Valley Saints
- Western Ireland
