= Organisation of sport in Australia =

The organisation of sport in Australia has been largely determined by its Federal system of government – Australian Government and six states and two territories governments and local governments. All three levels play an important role in terms of funding, policies and facilities. Each major sport is managed by a national sports organisation, with state counterparts that manage community sporting clubs. Umbrella or peak organisations represent the interests of sports organisations or particular sport issues. Education sector plays a small role through universities and schools. Private sector's involvement is extensive in professional sport through facilities, club ownership and finance/sponsorship.

== Government ==
Government involvement in sport up until the 1970s was fairly limited with local governments playing a major role through the provision of sporting facilities. However, this changed over the next two decades with an Australian Bureau of Statistics survey in 2001–2002 finding that approximately $2 billion was spent on sport by three levels of government – 10 per cent from the Australian Government, 40 per cent from state and territory governments, and the remaining 50 per cent from local government. State, territory and local government spending was predominantly directed to facilities and their upkeep. This amount most likely has increased since that survey.

National Approach In 1973, the Recreation Minister's Council was established to provide a forum for Australian Government and State and Territory Minister's responsible for sport and recreation to discuss matters of interest. With government's taking an increased involvement in sport, it became the Sport and Recreation Minister's Council. More recently is referred to as Meeting of Sport and Recreation Ministers. The Meeting is assisted by the Committee of Australian Sport and Recreation Officials (CASRO) previously called the Standing Committee on Sport and Recreation (SCORS). The Meeting works cooperatively on issues such as match fixing, sport participation and water safety. In 2011, Minister's signed the National Sport and Active Recreation Policy Framework. The framework "provides a mechanism for the achievement of national goals for sport and active recreation, sets out agreed roles and responsibilities of governments and their expectations of sport and active recreation partners."

In 1993, National Elite Sports Council was established to provide a forum for communication, issues management and national program co-ordination across the high performance in Australia. It includes representatives from AIS, State Institute /Academies, Australian Olympic Committee, Australian Paralympic Committee, and the Australian Commonwealth Games Association. In 2011, National Institute System Intergovernmental Agreement provides "guidance on how the sector will operate, with a principal focus on the delivery of the high performance plans of national sporting organisations."

=== Australian government ===
The Australian government provided small amounts of funding in the 1950s and 1960s through the support of the National Fitness Council and international sporting teams such as the Australian Olympic team. The Australian Government's serious involvement and investment into sport came with it establishing the Australian Institute of Sport (AIS) in 1981. AIS was set up to improve Australia's performances in international sport which had started to decline in the 1960s and 1970s culminating in Australia winning no gold medals at the 1976 Montreal Olympics. In 1985, the Australian Sports Commission (ASC) was established to improve the Australian Government's administration of sport in terms of funding, participation and elite sport. The 1989 Senate Inquiry into drugs in sport resulted in the establishment of the Australian Sport Drug Agency (now called Australian Sports Anti-Doping Authority (ASADA)) in 1990 to manage Australia's anti-doping program. In 2021, Sport Integrity Australia was established and it incorporated ASADA operations and also covers child abuse in sporting environments, unfair manipulation of games, and failures to protect those involved.

The Minister for Sport is supported by the Office of Sport located in their department. The Office's works with the key agencies ASC and ASADA in the development of sport.

=== State governments ===
State and Territory governments have a department with responsibility for sport and recreation. These departments provide assistance to state sports organisations, develop and manage sporting facilities, provide financial assistance for major sporting events and develop policies to assist sports across their state or territory. Each Australian State and Territory has established its own institute/academy of sport – ACT Academy of Sport (established 1989), New South Wales Institute of Sport (1996), Northern Territory Institute of Sport (1996), Queensland Academy of Sport (1991), South Australian Sports Institute (1982), Tasmanian Institute of Sport (1985), Victorian Institute of Sport (1990) and Western Australian Institute of Sport (1984). These institutes/academies and the AIS work together through the National Institutes Network and the National Elite Sports Council. Victoria and New South Wales have established regional academies.

Many state governments have facility management trusts to manage their major sporting precincts and facilities. Examples are Sydney Olympic Park Authority (New South Wales) and State Sports Centre Trust (Victoria).

=== Local governments ===
There are 560 local councils across Australia. Local governments generally focus on the provision of facilities such as swimming pools, sporting fields, stadiums and tennis courts. Investment into sports development programs for local clubs is generally limited. In national sporting issues, local governments may be represented by Australian Local Government Association.

== Sports organisations ==
=== National sports organisations ===
In 2012, there were 102 national sports organisations (NSO) in Australia recognised by the Australian Sports Commission. 63 NSO's received funding from ASC in 2011–2012. All of these organisations are affiliated to an international organisation and where appropriate to the Australian Olympic Committee, Australian Paralympic Committee, Australian Commonwealth Games Association and the Confederation of Australian Sport. These organisations manage the participation and high performance sport programs of the sport.

Several of the national sports organisations run professional sports competitions/leagues:

- Cricket Australia – Sheffield Shield, Big Bash League, Women's Big Bash League
- AFL Commission – AFL and AFLW
- Australian Rugby League Commission – National Rugby League
- Australian Rugby Union – Super Rugby
- Football Federation Australia – A-League Men and A-League Women
- Basketball Australia – National Basketball League and Women's National Basketball League
- Netball Australia – Super Netball
- Baseball Australia – Australian Baseball League

There are other leagues where athletes receive little remuneration. These include:

- Bowls Australia
- Cricket Australia – Women's National Cricket League
- Hockey Australia – Australian Hockey League (Men and Women)
- Water Polo Australia – Australian Water Polo League (Men and Women)

=== State sports organisations ===
National sports organisation generally have eight affiliated state sports organisations that manage the activities of clubs in their state. This means there are over 800 state sports organisations in Australia. Most states have an organisation that represents their interests. These include Vicsport, NSW Sports Federation, ACTSPORT, Tasmanian Sports Federation, Western Australian Sports Federation, Sport SA, and Sports Federation of Queensland.

=== Clubs ===
Community sporting clubs are regarded as the lifeblood of Australian sport. These sporting clubs are affiliated to national and state sporting organisations. In 2010, Australian Bureau of Statistics found that 2.3 million or 14% of the adult population undertook voluntary work with the sport and recreation organisations, most likely to be sporting clubs. At the club level, volunteers include coaches, officials and administrators. Clubs generally receive their limited income from membership fees. Professional sporting clubs have been established to compete in national and international leagues such as Australian Football League, National Rugby League, A-League, ANZ Championship and Super 15.

== Educator sector ==
=== Universities ===
University sport in Australia is based primarily around the provision of sporting clubs and facilities. Only a few universities offer individual athletic scholarships. This is very different from the United States system organised by the National Collegiate Athletic Association which has well organised sports programs with scholarships. There has been a recent trend for universities to become involved with professional sporting teams. University of Canberra is a major sponsor the ACT Brumbies and Victoria University has developed a strong partnership with the Western Bulldogs.

=== Sport schools ===
Most State Education Departments have established special sports high schools. These schools offer opportunities for talent sports students to develop sport skills in an environment that balances their sporting and education commitments. Westfield Sports High in Sydney is an example of a specialist school.

== Peak organisations ==
There are a range of peak or umbrella organisations that represent the specific interests and provide advice to governments, sports organisations and the community.

- Australian Olympic Committee (AOC) – manages Australia's participation at the Summer Olympics, Winter Olympics and Youth Olympics.
- Paralympics Australia (PA) – manages Australia's participation at the Summer Paralympics and Winter Paralympics.
- Australian Commonwealth Games Association (ACGA) – manages Australia's participation at the Commonwealth Games and Commonwealth Youth Games.
- Australian University Sport (AUS) – manages university sport including the Australian University Games and Australia's participation at the Summer Universiade and Winter Universiade.
- Confederation of Australian Sport (CAS)
- Coalition of Major Professional and Participation Sports (COMPPS) – provides a collective response from the seven major sports
- Deaf Sports Australia (DSA) - manages Australia's participation at the Summer Deaflympic Games and Winter Deaflympic Games.
- Sports Medicine Australia (SMA) – national umbrella body for sports medicine and sports science.
- Sports Dietitians Australia (SDA) – professional organisation of dietitians specialising in sports nutrition.
- Australian Council for Health, Physical Education and Recreation (ACHPER) – represents the interests of professionals working in the fields of health, physical education, sport, movement sciences, dance and community fitness.
- Australian Society for Sports History (ASSH) – research and promotion of sport history in Australia.
- Australian and New Zealand Sports Law Association (ANZSLA) – education and advocacy on legal issues in Australian and New Zealand sport.
- Australasian College of Sports Physicians (ACSP) – represents Australian and New Zealand sports physicians.
- Exercise and Sport Science Australia (ESSA) – represents exercise and sports science professionals.
- Australian Athletes Alliance (AAA) – advocates on behalf of Australian athletes at the state and national levels
- Sport Management Association of Australia and New Zealand – research and promotion of sport management in Australia and New Zealand.
- Sport Australia Hall of Fame – recognises and promotes the sporting achievements of Australians.
- Outdoor Council of Australia – professional organisation for active recreation pursuits and outdoor education. Also the owner of the Australian Adventurous Activity Standard. Members are Outdoors NSW & ACT, Outdoors Victoria, Outdoors Queensland, Outdoors WA, Outdoors SA, Australian Camps Association, Christian Venues Association, Scouts Australia and Outdoor Education Australia.

== Private sector ==
This sector contributes to sport through facilities, finance and sponsorship. All professional sports competitions and their teams rely heavily on private sponsorship. This sponsorship is provided to national sports organisations and community clubs but at greatly reduced level. Only high-profile sports organisations such as Australian Football League, Australian Rugby Union, Australian Rugby League Commission and Football Federation Australia have substantial sponsorship income. Many sporting venues have been renamed to include the sponsor's name to increase revenue. Examples include Etihad Stadium, Suncorp Stadium and Paterson's Stadium. Many professional sporting teams have a private ownership model. This is a growing trend but it has not been without its difficulties.

== See also ==
- Sport in Australia
- Australian Sports Commission
- Australian Institute of Sport
- Australian Sports Anti-Doping Authority
- Australian Government Ministers for Sport
- Category:Sports organisations of Australia
