= Gaelic Games Canada =

Unit of the Gaelic Athletic Association

Canada GAA
- Founded: 15 November 1987; 38 years ago
- Dominant sport: Gaelic football
- County colours: Red White
- Website: gaelicgamescanada.com

Executive
- Chairman: Matt Healy
- Secretary: Sean Harte
- Treasurer: Kimberly Budd

Clubs
- Total: 27

Gaelic Games Canada (GGC), or the Canadian GAA (CGAA), is responsible for Gaelic games across Canada, overseeing approximately 20 clubs. It has the same status as one of the county boards of Ireland and is one of over thirty regional GAA executive boards throughout the world. The board is responsible for Gaelic football, hurling, camogie, rounders, gaelic handball, and ladies' Gaelic football teams in Canada.

Gaelic Games Canada connects with three Gaelic games and cultural organizations: the Gaelic Athletic Association (GAA), the Ladies Gaelic Football Association (LGFA) & the Camogie Association (CA) whose headquarters are based in Dublin, Ireland.

One of the more important tournaments for Gaelic football in Canada is the annual Western Canadian Championship. In North American competition, Canadian teams compete in the USGAA Finals, hosted by the United States GAA, an annual Gaelic Games championship between qualifying clubs in North America. The Gaelic games involved include hurling, camogie, and Gaelic football. Internationally, Canada GAA has sent Canadian teams to the GAA World Games in 2016 and 2019.

== History ==
Gaelic games have been played in Canada since before the foundation of the Gaelic Athletic Association in the 1880s, with some sources indicating that games of hurling were played in St. John's, Newfoundland in 1788.

Since the formation of the American County Board in the 1950s, Canadian teams have competed alongside teams from the United States. A separate and distinct Canadian County Board was founded in November 1987, and represented upwards of 20 clubs within Canada. The organization has since been renamed, "Gaelic Games Canada" (GGC).

In 2017, Jim Kelly, the Irish ambassador to Canada, said:

...GAA in Canada continues to grow and flourish, bringing together people of all backgrounds to learn and love our national games, to develop a deep sense of community, and to build a strong connection with Ireland.

— Christopher Whan, "Eastern Canadian GAA Championships coming to Twin Elm rugby park Sept. 2", InsideOttawaValley.com (2017-08-28)

== Organization ==
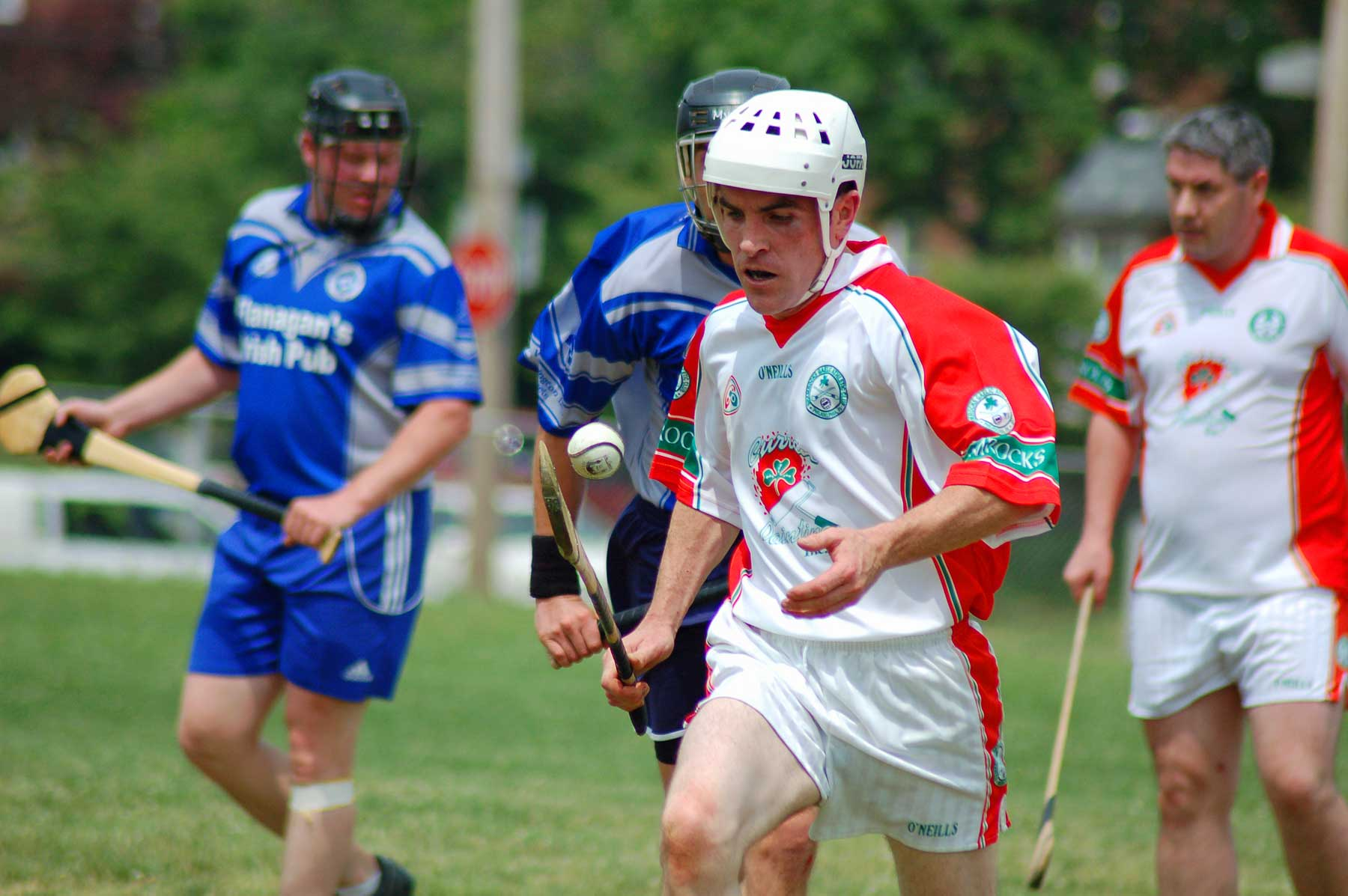
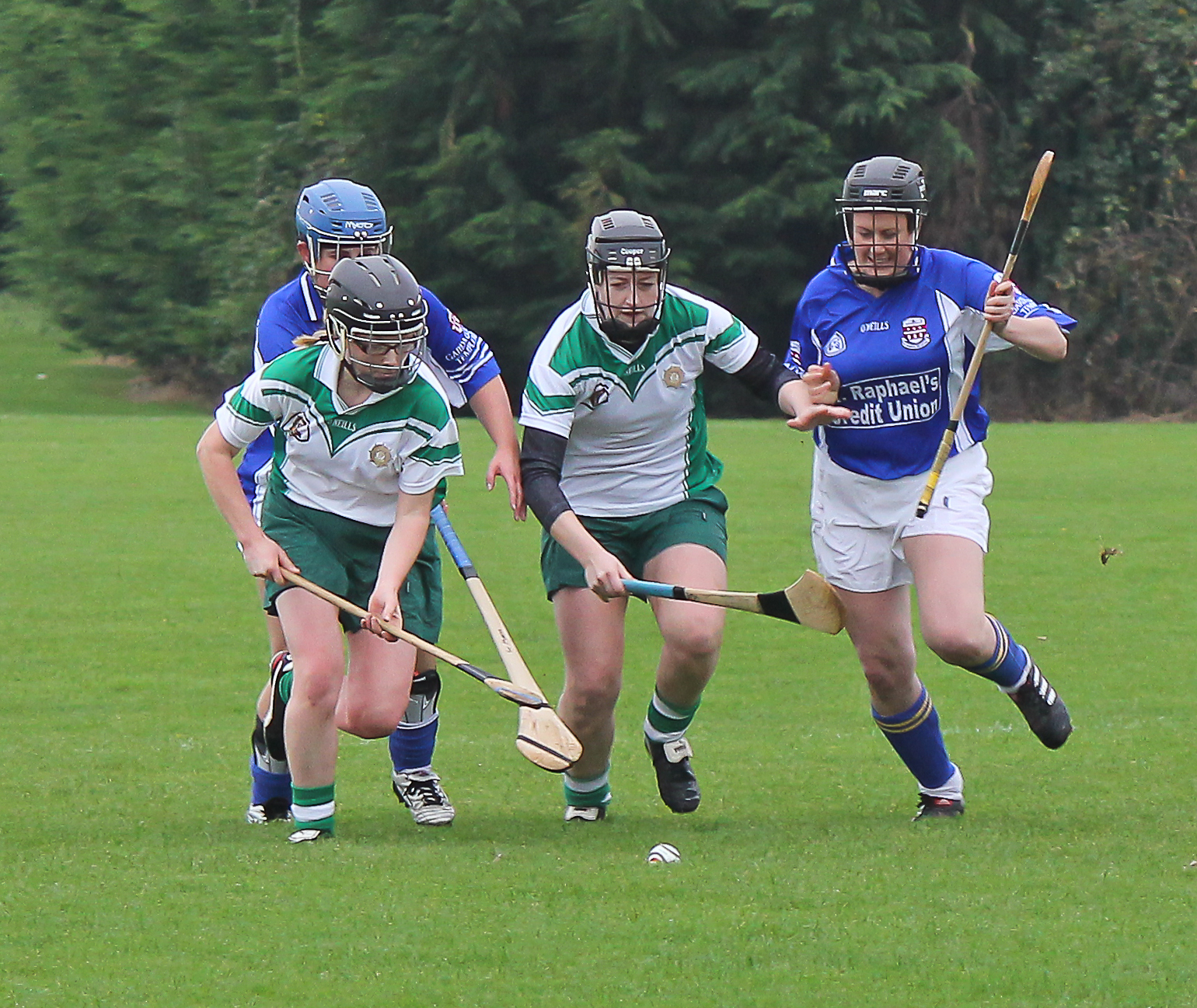
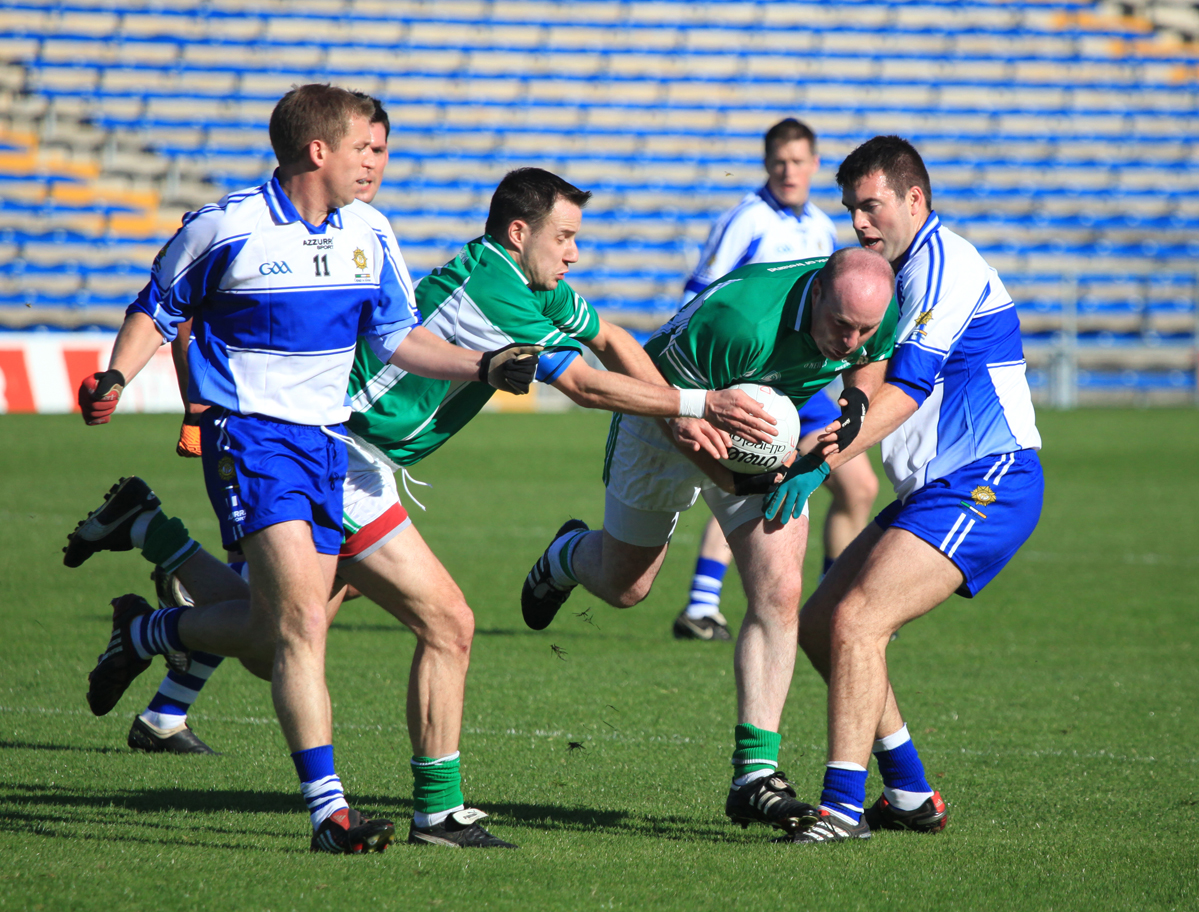
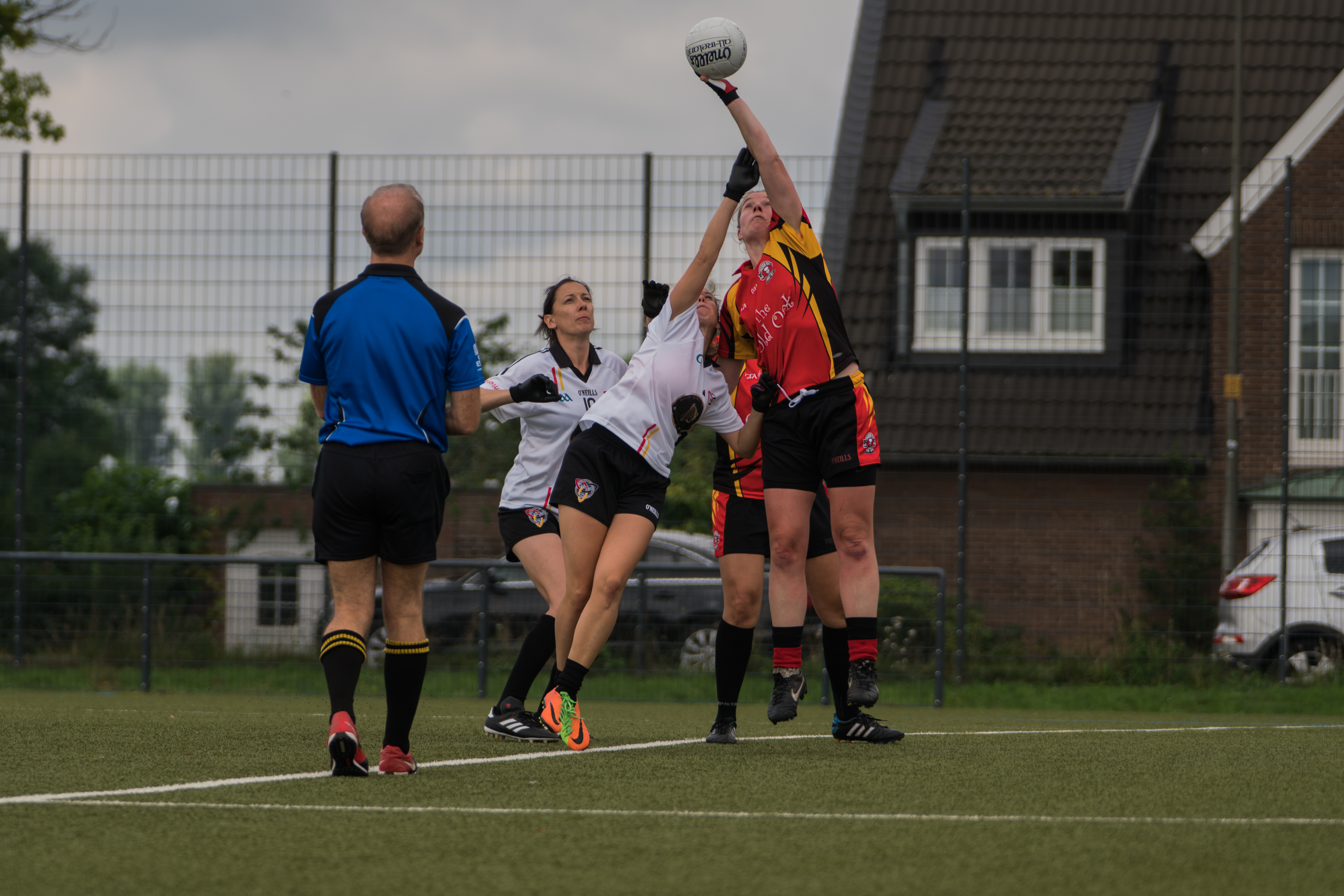
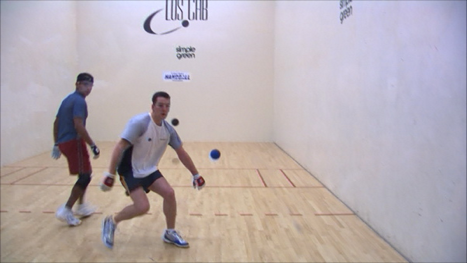
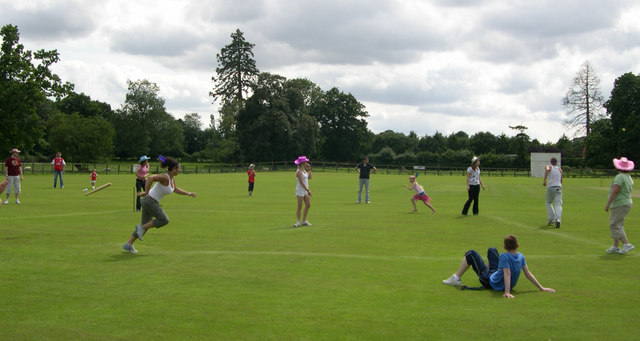
Hurling; Camogie; Men's Gaelic Football; Ladies' Gaelic Football; Gaelic handball; Rounders

The Canadian County Board of the GAA has overall control of GAA activities in Canada and organized into three divisional boards. These boards, representing different areas of Canada, include the Toronto Board, Western Divisional Board and Eastern Canada GAA Board.

=== Toronto Division (TGAA) ===
Established in 1947, the Toronto (or Central) Board covers teams in the Greater Toronto Area. Today, the Toronto Gaelic Athletic Association (TGAA) divisional sub committee organizes Gaelic games clubs and competitions in the Toronto, Ottawa and Montreal areas. As of mid-2020 this included 5 Men's Gaelic football teams, 5 Ladies Gaelic football teams, 3 hurling teams, 2 camogie teams and 3 minor programs.

=== Western Division (WCGAA) ===
Founded in May 2003, the Western Canada Gaelic Athletic Association (WCGAA or Western Division) covers Gaelic Athletics Activities in British Columbia, Alberta, Saskatchewan, and Manitoba. Many of the clubs in the division have field both men's and ladies' teams.

Unaffiliated clubs in Western Canada are often invited to attend WCGAA tournaments, even though they are not affiliated with the division (e.g. Lethbridge Laochra, Seattle Gaels, Fort McMurray, Vancouver Irish, etc) or the GAA (e.g. Vancouver Cougars, Calgary Kangaroos, and Calgary Kookaburras Australian rules football teams).

The main competition in the Western Division is the Western Canadian Championship. Teams also play in local competitions, including the Alberta Cup, which serves as a feeder to the Championship, and is hosted by the individual teams themselves.

=== Eastern Division (ECGAA) ===
The Eastern Division Gaelic Athletic Association (ECGAA) divisional sub committee, or Eastern Division, was established in 2014, and covers eastern Ontario, Quebec, Nova Scotia, and Prince Edward Island.

The primary competition of the Eastern Division is the Eastern Canadian Championships. This competition was first established in 2014, and held in Newfoundland. In 2017, youth games were included at the Championships held in Ottawa.

== Clubs ==
There are clubs in every province of Canada with the exception of New Brunswick, the Northwest Territories, Nunavut, and the Yukon.

The following are the GAA clubs of the Canadian Gaelic Athletic Association, (CGAA):

=== Eastern GAA ===
- GFC = Gaelic Football Club
- GAA = Gaelic Athletic Association

Eastern Canada GAA
Eastern GAA Divisional Board
Club	City/Province	Est.
Montreal Shamrocks	Montreal, Québec	1948
Les Patriotes de Québec (Quebec City Patriotes)	Québec City, Québec	
Halifax Gaels GAA	Halifax, Nova Scotia	
Avalon Harps	St. John's, Newfoundland	
PEI Celts	Prince Edward Island	2015
Eire Og Ottawa GAA	Ottawa, Ontario	
Éire Óg Ottawa Hurling Club	Ottawa, Ontario	2012
Ottawa Gaels GFC	Ottawa, Ontario	

=== Toronto GAA (Central Canada) ===
- GFC = Gaelic Football Club
- GAA = Gaelic Athletic Association

Toronto GAA
Toronto GAA Divisional Board
Club	City/Province	Est.
Durham Emmetts GFC	Durham, Ontario	
Michael Cusack Ladies GFC	Toronto, Ontario	
Roger Casement's GFC	Brampton, Ontario	
St Michael's H&FC	Toronto, Ontario	
St. Pat's Canadians	Toronto, Ontario	1968
Le Chéile Camogie Club Toronto	Toronto, Ontario	
Toronto Gaels GFC	Toronto, Ontario	1987
Toronto HC	Toronto, Ontario	
Toronto Chieftains	Ontario	
St Vincent's GAA	Toronto, Ontario	1959
Clan na nGael HC	Toronto, Ontario	
Cuala Sarsfields	Ontario	2020
Durham Robert Emmets	Ontario	
Na Piasaigh CLG	Ontario	2010
Toronto Michael Davitts GAC	Toronto, Ontario	2023

=== Western Canada GAA ===
- GFC = Gaelic Football Club
- GAA = Gaelic Athletic Association
- ISSC = Vancouver Irish Sporting and Social Club

Western Canada GAA
Western Canada GAA Divisional Board
Club	City/Province	Est.
ISSC Vancouver GAA	Vancouver, British Columbia	1974
Calgary Chieftains/Chieftainettes	Calgary, Alberta	1977
Red Deer Éire Óg	Red Deer, Alberta	
Edmonton Wolfe Tones	Edmonton, Alberta	
ISSC Vancouver LGFA	Vancouver, British Columbia	1993
ISSC Vancouver GAA Camogie	Vancouver, British Columbia	2011
Fraser Valley Gaels	Vancouver, British Columbia	2014
JP Ryans Hurling Club (ISSC)	Vancouver, British Columbia	2011
Cú Chulainn GAA Club	Vancouver, British Columbia	2018
Vancouver Éire Óg GAA Club	Vancouver, British Columbia	2018
Fort McMurray Shamrocks	Alberta	
Edmonton Wolfe Tones	Alberta	
Calgary Chieftains	Alberta	
St Finnian's	British Columbia	2019
Winnipeg Trinity	Manitoba	
Regina Gaels	Saskatchewan	
Wolfe Tones	Vancouver, British Columbia	2022

== Tournaments ==
=== Canadian tournaments ===
Canadians who participation in Gaelic Games have a number of opportunities to compete at the local, provincial, and inter-provincial level, within Canadian borders.

These include the Western Canadian Championship, which is a tournament for Canadian Gaelic football teams.

The inaugural Canadian National Championships were held in Toronto in 2022. Gaelic games, across all codes, were played at all levels. It was an all Vancouver hurling final when JP Ryan's defeated local rivals Cú Chulainn whilst St Finnian's defeated St Vincent's in the Men's Football final. In camogie, Le Chéile Camogie Club came out on top after the 3rd and final game. ISSC Vancouver Ladies footballers came from 8 pts behind to defeat Toronto's Ladies Football Champions St Pat's in the ladies football final.

=== North American tournaments ===
In North American competition, Canadian teams compete in the USGAA North American Championships, hosted in America by the United States Gaelic Athletic Association (USGAA).

=== International tournaments ===
Canada GAA has previously sent Canadian teams to the GAA World Games, including the 2016 Etihad Airways GAA World Games. For the 2019 Renault GAA World Games, thirty-four Montreal Shamrocks were selected to represent Canada. This competition was hosted in Ireland in July 2019. It was the largest delegate from 1 club in Canada.
