= Gaelic Games Victoria =

- Dominant sport: Gaelic football

Gaelic Games Victoria (GGV) is the ruling body for the Irish sports of Gaelic football and Hurling in the Australian state of Victoria. The organisation was established in 2020 and is affiliated to Australasia GAA and the Gaelic Athletic Association.

== History ==
The administration of Gaelic games in Victoria commenced in 1975 with the establishment of the Victorian Gaelic Athletic Association (VGAA). The VGAA was the body responsible for the sports and clubs in the state until 2020, when a split among the clubs resulted in the creation of the GGV. The GGV became formally recognised as the administrative body for the sports by the GAA in March 2020, after a majority of the existing clubs succeeded in winning recognition for the new entity, and shifted matches away from the VGAA's sporting facility in Keysborough.

Gaelic Games Victoria oversees both football and hurling fixtures across multiple divisions, with matches played mostly during the winter months.

State representative teams are sent to the Australasian Championships every year with men's seniors, minors and women's teams competing.

== Clubs ==
- Garryowen
- Geelong Gaels
- Melbourne Shamrocks
- Padraig Pearse
- Sinn Féin
- St Kelvins
- Wolfe Tones
- Young Melbourne

== See also ==
- Sport in Victoria
