= Dual county =

Irish county with teams at similar level in hurling, Gaelic football

Dual county (Irish: Contae déach) is a term used in Gaelic games to describe a county that competes at a similar level in both hurling and Gaelic football. For example, Dublin play in Division 1 in both the NHL and NFL, while Laois compete in the second tier of the football competition and the first tier of the hurling competition.

Among the dual counties generally recognised are:

- Cork
- Dublin
- Galway
- Kildare
- Laois
- Offaly
- Westmeath

Carlow and Wexford were considered dual counties in the past, although their respective hurling teams have outperformed their football teams in recent decades. Other counties that feature in the lower tiers of Hurling and Football Divisions could also be classified as Dual Counties. Laois, Offaly, and Westmeath would be considered as having strong hurling bases. The traditionally football-dominated counties of Kildare and Wicklow began to have steady and growing hurling populations in the 21st century, with their hurling teams outperforming their footballing counterparts. Kildare would now be considered a fully-fledged dual county.

Only Tipperary and Cork have won both premier men's competitions, the All-Ireland Senior Hurling and All-Ireland Senior Football championships in the same year. Tipperary won both in 1895 and 1900, while Cork won both in 1890 and 1990. Tipperary has been regarded primarily as a hurling county for most of its history, however, having not won a senior All-Ireland football title since 1935. A golden footballing generation in the 2010s did help the county win an All-Ireland Minor Football Championship in 2011 and Munster Senior Football Championship in 2020. Dublin have made significant improvements in hurling since the turn of the millennium, winning the 2011 National Hurling League and the 2013 Leinster Senior Hurling Championship, and are now considered a dual county.

Dual player is a similar phrase used to describe players who play both sports.
