= Auckland GAA =

- Dominant sport: Gaelic football

Auckland GAA (AGAA) was established in 1975. It is the ruling body for Gaelic football and hurling in the Auckland region of New Zealand.

The AGAA runs both Men's and Women's Football matches over the summer at Seddon Fields in Auckland. The competition was previously played over winter, however clashes with other sports deemed it necessary to move to a summer competition to attract more players.

== Clubs ==
Current clubs

- St Pats Emerald City
- Celtic
- Gaels GFC
- Harps GFC
- Marist Rangers

Previous clubs

- Dale Paddy's GFC
- Harps Rebels
- Hutt Valley
- Kitty O'Shea's
- Marist Gaels
- Molly Malones
- Connemara Gaels

== See also ==
- Wellington GAA
