= Asian GAA =

Gaelic Athletic Association county board

- Founded: 2006
- County colours: Red White, Black

Regular kit

The Asian County Board (ACB) of the Gaelic Athletic Association (GAA), also sometimes known as Asian GAA, is one of the county boards of the GAA outside Ireland. The Asian Gaelic Games have been running since 1996.The Middle Eastern Board of the Gaelic Athletic Association or Middle East GAA is one of the international county boards, and is responsible for organising Gaelic games in the Middle East.

== Scope ==
The board is responsible for Gaelic games across Asia and Oceania except for Australia and New Zealand, which are under the auspices of Australasia County board. The county board is also responsible for Asian county teams.

The Asian GAA is headquartered at the Singapore Grounds, also known as the Singapore Polo Club.

== Competitions ==
The All-China Gaelic Games is a Gaelic games tournament held annually in China between club teams under the auspices of the Gaelic Athletic Association (GAA) and the Asian County Board began in 2002.

=== Men's football (Derek Brady Cup) ===
The Derek Brady Cup is a Gaelic football cup awarded by the Asian County Board. The first tournament was held in 1996 in Manila, with eight teams competing. The tournament was named the Derek Brady Cup from 1997, after one of the founders of the Taiwan Celts, 21 year old Derek Brady, who died in 1996. The cup, a crystal replica of the Sam Maguire Cup, was commissioned by his family.

Roll of Honour
Year	Winner	Score	Runner Up	Score	Venue
2025	Singapore Gaelic Lions	5-6	Thailand	1-4	Bangkok
2021	Cancelled due to the COVID-19 pandemic				
2020	Cancelled due to the COVID-19 pandemic				
2019	Singapore				Kuala Lumpur
2018	Seoul Gaels	0-9	Singapore Gaelic Lions	0-8	Bangkok
2017	Seoul Gaels				Bangkok
2016	Shanghai		Hong Kong		Shanghai
2015	Singapore Gaelic Lions				Shanghai
2014	Singapore Gaelic Lions		Seoul Gaels		Kuala Lumpur
2013	Qatar	1-8	Dubai Celts	0-8	Kuala Lumpur
2012	Singapore Gaelic Lions				Kuala Lumpur
2011	Hong Kong				Seoul
2010	Dubai Celts	1-7	Qatar	1-4	Hong Kong
2009	Hong Kong		Seoul Gaels		Bangkok
2008	Hong Kong		Singapore Gaelic Lions		Penang
2007	Hong Kong	5-7	Singapore Gaelic Lions	3-4	Singapore
2006	Hong Kong		Singapore Gaelic Lions		Shanghai
2005	Dubai Celts	2-8	Hong Kong	2-6	Shanghai
2004	Seoul Gaels		Singapore Gaelic Lions		Hong Kong
2003	Seoul Gaels		Japan		Hong Kong
2002	Seoul Gaels		Singapore Gaelic Lions		Phuket
2001	Japan		Singapore Gaelic Lions		Phuket
2000	Japan		Singapore Gaelic Lions		Phuket
1999	Singapore Gaelic Lions		Japan		Singapore
1998	Singapore Gaelic Lions		Hong Kong		Manila
1997	Hong Kong		Taiwan Celts		Manila
1996	Hong Kong		Taiwan		Manila

=== Ladies' Football (Lisa Orsi Cup) ===
The Lisa Orsi Cup is the Senior Ladies' Football Cup for the Asian GAA. It was named after Derry native and Singapore Gaelic Lions player Lisa Orsi after she died in Indonesia at 22. Her family also set up the Live Life Lisa Orsi Foundation, which brings young Gaelic players from Derry to the Asian Gaelic Games.

The Asian Gaelic Games were cancelled in 2020 and 2021 due to the COVID-19 Pandemic

Roll of Honour
Year	Winner	Score	Runner Up	Score	Venue
2025	Singapore Gaelic Lions		Saigon		Bangkok
2024	Singapore Gaelic Lions		Saigon		Bangkok
2023	Singapore Gaelic Lions		Saigon		Kuala Lumpur
2022	Singapore Gaelic Lions		Orang Eire		Kuala Lumpur
2021	Cancelled due to the COVID-19 pandemic				
2020	Cancelled due to the COVID-19 pandemic				
2019	Hong Kong		Singapore Gaelic Lions		Kuala Lumpur
2018	Singapore Gaelic Lions		Hong Kong		Bangkok
2017	Hong Kong				Bangkok
2016	Singapore Gaelic Lions		Seoul		Shanghai
2015	Abu Dhabi	1-09	Seoul	1-04	Shanghai
2014	Singapore Gaelic Lions		Shanghai		Kuala Lumpur
2013	Shanghai		Singapore Gaelic Lions		Kuala Lumpur
2012	Singapore Gaelic Lions				Kuala Lumpur
2011	Singapore Gaelic Lions				Seoul
2010	Singapore Gaelic Lions	7-7	Seoul	1-5	Hong Kong
2009	Singapore Gaelic Lions		Dubai		Bangkok
2008	Dubai		Seoul		Penang
2007	Dubai		Seoul	Singapore	
2006	Dubai		Hong Kong		Shanghai
2005	Beijing		Dubai		Shanghai
2004	Hong Kong		Singapore Gaelic Lions		Hong Kong
2003	Japan		Hong Kong		Hong Kong
2002	Japan		Hong Kong		Phuket
2001	Hong Kong				Phuket
2000	Hong Kong				Phuket
1999	Hong Kong		Singapore Gaelic Lions		Singapore

== Teams ==
As of 2019, there were approximately 25 club teams from 14 nations overseen by the county board:

Club	Region
Bangkok Thai GAA	Bangkok
Beijing Dragons	Beijing
Cambodia GAA	Siam Reap, Phanom Phenn
Canton Celts	Macau
Dalian Wolfhounds	Dalian
Daegu Fianna	Daegu
Exiles GAA	Asia
Ho Chi Minh	Saigon
Hong Kong Dragons	Hong Kong
Inis Jeju GAA	Korea
India Wolfhounds	New Delhi, India
Jakarta Dragonflies	Jakarta
Japan GAA	Japan
Tokyo Samurai	Tokyo
Laochra Busan	Busan
Manila GAA	Philippines
Mekong Shamrocks	Laos
Myanmar Celts	Yangon
Orang Eire	Malaysia
Penang Pumas	Malaysia
Qatar G.F.A	Qatar
Saigon Gaels	Saigon
Seoul Gaels	Seoul
Shanghai Saints and Sirens	Shanghai
Shenzhen Celts	Shenzhen
Singapore Lions	Singapore
Suzhou Eire	Suzhou
Taiwan Celts	Taiwan
Viet Celts	Vietnam
