= Wellington GAA =

Gaelic sports organisation in New Zealand

Wellington GAA (WGAA) was established in 1975. It is the governing body for Gaelic football and hurling in the Wellington region of New Zealand, and is affiliated to the Australasia GAA.

The WGAA runs both Men's and Women's Football matches over the summer at various locations in Wellington. The competition was previously played over winter, however clashes with other sports deemed it necessary to move to a summer competition to attract more players.

State Representative Teams are sent to the Australasian Championships when numbers and interest allow.

== See also ==
- Auckland GAA
- Canterbury GAA
