= New South Wales GAA =

Gaelic sports division in Australia

New South Wales
- Nickname(s): Waratahs
- Founded: 1920s
- Ground(s): Monarch Oval, Ingleburn
- County colours: Sky blue and navy

Regular kit

The New South Wales Board (Irish: Cumann Lúthchleas Gael, Coiste An Bhreatain Bheag Nua ó Dheas) or New South Wales GAA (NSW GAA) is a division of the Australasian Gaelic Athletic Association (GAA), and is responsible for Gaelic games in New South Wales, Australia. The board is also responsible for the New South Wales state team.

The board contains clubs from Sydney and Wollongong, playing Gaelic football, hurling, ladies' gaelic football and camogie. The games are played at Monarch Oval in Ingleburn.

== Gaelic football clubs ==
- Bondi Gaels
- Central Coast
- Clan na Gael
- Cormac McAnallan's
- Craobh Phádraig
- Michael Cusacks
- Penrith Gaels
- Wollongong Leprachauns
- Young Ireland Sydney

== Hurling clubs ==
- Michael Cusack's
- Central Coast
- Cormac McAnallan's
- St. Pat's
- Sydney Shamrocks

== Women's Gaelic football clubs ==
- Central Coast
- Clan na Gael
- Cormac McAnallan's (formerly Irish Aussies)
- Craobh Phádraig
- Michael Cusack's
- Penrith Gaels
- Young Ireland Sydney

== Camogie clubs ==
- Central Coast
- Clan na Gael
- Cormac McAnallan's
- Craobh Phádraig
- Michael Cusack's
