= Tasmanian Gaelic Football and Hurling Association =

Gaelic games organisation

Tasmania

The Tasmanian Gaelic Football and Hurling Association (TGFHA) was established in 2007 and is the ruling body for Gaelic football and hurling in the Australian state of Tasmania. The TGFHA is affiliated to the Gaelic Football and Hurling Association of Australasia where it is represented by a vice-president.

The TGFHA runs weekly training and matches for both males and females in Gaelic Football at the North Chigwell Sports Ground during summer to avoid clashes with traditional winter sports such as Association Football and Australian Football. The TGFHA hopes to encourage involvement in Hurling in the future.

The TGFHA sends male and female Gaelic Football teams to interstate competitions annually.

== Local competition ==
The TGFHA runs men's and women's local 7-a-side Gaelic Football competitions with the following teams. The men play for the Keiran Middleton trophy.

=== Men's ===
- Lauderdale Bombers (formerly known as Clarence - first season 2011/12)
- Hobart Celts (first season 2010/11)
- Old Lindisfarne Saints (first season 2010/11)
- Na Fianna Shamrocks (the result of a merger during the 2011/12 season between the Shamrocks - first season 2010/11 and Na Fianna - first season 2011/12)
- Southern Falcons (first season 2013/14)
- Hobart Tigers (first season 2015/16)

=== Women's ===
There is a women's competition in Tasmania. The following teams have previously competed:

- Hobart Celts
- Shamrocks
- North Hobart

=== Results ===
Season	Men's Winner	Women's Winner	Format	Venue
2015–2016	Hobart Tigers	Shamrocks	7s	North Chigwell Sports Ground
2014–2015	Shamrocks	Unknown	7s	North Chigwell Sports Ground
2013–2014	Southern Falcons	NA	7s	Hobart Showgrounds
2012–2013	Clarence	NA	7s	Hobart Showgrounds
2011–2012	Old Lindisfarne	NA	7s	Hobart Showgrounds
2010–2011	Old Lindisfarne	NA	7s	Hobart Showgrounds

Source.

== Tasmanian Blitz tournament ==
The TGFHA host interstate Gaelic football teams from all over Australia in an annual "Tasmanian Blitz" tournament in November. The men play for the Mairtin MacMathuna Memorial Trophy.

Year	Men's Winner	Women's Winner	Format	Venue
2016	Craobh Phadraig (NSW)	no women's tournament	7s	North Chigwell Sports Ground
2015	Irish Australians (SA)	Canberra Gaels (ACT)	7s	North Chigwell Sports Ground
2014	Unknown	Unknown	7s	North Chigwell Sports Ground
2013	St Kevin's (Melbourne)	St Kevin's (Melbourne)	7s	Hobart Showgrounds
2012	Padraig Pearses (Melbourne)	Tasmania	7s	Hobart Showgrounds
2011	Padraig Pearses (Melbourne)	Padraig Pearses (Melbourne)	7s	Hobart Showgrounds
2010	Clan Na Gael (Sydney)	Central Coast (NSW)	7s	Hobart Showgrounds
2009	Tasmanian Gaels (Hobart)	Tasmania-Central Coast Combination (Hobart/NSW)	15s	Hobart Showgrounds
2008	Michael Cusacks (Sydney)		15s	Rugby Park
2007	Tasmanian Gaels (Hobart)	St. Kevins (Melbourne)	15s	Uni Rugby Ground
