= County (Gaelic games) =

Gaelic games terminology

A county is a geographic region within Gaelic games, controlled by a county board of the Gaelic Athletic Association (GAA) and originally based on the 32 counties of Ireland as they were in 1884. While the administrative geography of Ireland has since changed, with several new counties created and the six that make up Northern Ireland superseded by 11 local government districts, the counties in Gaelic games have remained largely unchanged.

However, the county as used in Gaelic games does not always and everywhere cover precisely the same territory as the traditional county. Particularly in the first 50 years of the Association but also in more recent times, there are many examples of clubs based in one of the administrative counties being allowed to participate in the leagues or championships of a neighbouring county. There are also instances where the official county boundary does not coincide precisely with the county as used in Gaelic games, for example where a club is based on a parish that crosses the county border. While in most cases the name of the county as used in Gaelic games is the same as that of the current or former administrative county, there have been exceptions: Derry has never used the official county name of Londonderry, and the board of the county then officially known as Queen's County changed its name in 1907 to Leix and Ossary, later becoming Laois. Each county board is responsible for organising GAA club fixtures within the county, and for the promotion and development of Gaelic games and the other objectives of the Association.

The county can also refer to the inter-county teams fielded by each county board. While in general any county, and only a county, is eligible to compete in the provincial and national championships and leagues, and almost all do so, again there can be anomalies: in the National Hurling League, for example, a team representing Fingal — a sub-region of the GAA county of Dublin, corresponding to the modern administrative county of Fingal — previously competed against other counties.

Since the inception of the county system, there have been changes to the respective regions of control of the overseas units. In Ireland the concept of the county is very strong and changing the county boundary is extremely controversial. In 2002 a proposal to divide Dublin in two was quickly and strongly opposed.

== List of every county board ==
=== In Ireland (32) ===
- Antrim
- Armagh
- Carlow
- Cavan
- Clare
- Cork
- Derry
- Donegal
- Down
- Dublin
- Fermanagh
- Galway
- Kerry
- Kildare
- Kilkenny
- Laois
- Leitrim
- Limerick
- Longford
- Louth
- Mayo
- Meath
- Monaghan
- Offaly
- Roscommon
- Sligo
- Tipperary
- Tyrone
- Waterford
- Westmeath
- Wexford
- Wicklow

=== Outside Ireland (14) ===
- Asia
- Australasia
- Canada
- Europe
- Gloucestershire
- Hertfordshire
- Lancashire
- London
- Middle East
- New York
- Scotland
- United States
- Warwickshire
- Yorkshire

== County boards in Ireland ==
Listed below are the 32 county boards based in Ireland and the provincial council to which each is affiliated to. Connacht have five affiliated county boards, Leinster have twelve, Munster have six and Ulster have nine. Also provided is a map showing the location of the province, i.e. north, south, east, west.

Provinces of Ireland

Board	Irish name	Province
Antrim	Aontroim (Contae Aontroma)	Ulster
Armagh	Ard Mhacha (Contae Ard Mhacha)	Ulster
Carlow	Ceatharlach (Contae Cheatharlach)	Leinster
Cavan	An Cabhán (Contae an Chabháin)	Ulster
Clare	An Clár (Contae an Chláir)	Munster
Cork	Corcaigh (Contae Chorcaí)	Munster
Derry (Note: Derry represents County Londonderry (see Derry-Londonderry name dispute) — the GAA only uses the name Derry.)	Doire (Contae Dhoire)	Ulster
Donegal	Dún na nGall (Contae Dhún na nGall)	Ulster
Down	An Dún (Contae an Dúin)	Ulster
Dublin	Áth Cliath (Contae Átha Cliath)	Leinster
Fermanagh	Fear Manach (Contae Fhear Manach)	Ulster
Galway	Gaillimh (Contae na Gaillimhe)	Connacht
Kerry	Ciarraí (Contae Chiarraí)	Munster
Kildare	Cill Dara (Contae Chill Dara)	Leinster
Kilkenny	Cill Chainnigh (Contae Chill Chainnigh)	Leinster
Laois	Laois (Contae Laoise)	Leinster
Leitrim	Liatroim (Contae Liatroma)	Connacht
Limerick	Luimneach (Contae Luimnigh)	Munster
Longford	An Longfort (Contae an Longfoirt)	Leinster
Louth	Lú (Contae Lú)	Leinster
Mayo	Maigh Eo (Contae Mhaigh Eo)	Connacht
Meath	An Mhí (Contae na Mí)	Leinster
Monaghan	Muineachán (Contae Mhuineacháin)	Ulster
Offaly	Uíbh Fhailí (Contae Uíbh Fhailí)	Leinster
Roscommon	Ros Comáin (Contae Ros Comáin)	Connacht
Sligo	Sligeach (Contae Shligigh)	Connacht
Tipperary	Tiobraid Árann (Contae Thiobraid Árann)	Munster
Tyrone	Tír Eoghain (Contae Thír Eoghain)	Ulster
Waterford	Port Láirge (Contae Phort Láirge)	Munster
Westmeath	An Iarmhí (Contae na hIarmhí)	Leinster
Wexford	Loch Garman (Contae Loch Garman)	Leinster
Wicklow	Cill Mhantáin (Contae Chill Mhantáin)	Leinster

== County boards outside of Ireland ==
Listed below are the 14 county boards outside of Ireland and the provincial council to which each is affiliated to. Seven county boards are affiliated to Britain and three county boards are affiliated to North America (an unofficial province). The remaining four county boards are not affiliated to any.

Board	Irish name	Province
Asia	An Áise (Contae na hÁise)	
Australasia	An Astráil (Contae na hAstráile)	
Canada	Ceanada (Contae Ceanada)	North America
Europe	Eoraip (Contae Eoraip)	
Gloucestershire	Chontae Gloucester	Britain
Hertfordshire		Britain
Lancashire	Lancasír	Britain
London	Londain (Contae Londain)	Britain
Middle East	An Meánoirthear (Contae an Mheán-Oirthir)	
New York	Nua Eabhrac (Contae Nua Eabhrac)	North America
Scotland	Albain (Contae na hAlban)	Britain
United States	Stáit Aontaithe Mhéiriceá (Contae Stáit Aontaithe Mheiriceá)	North America
Warwickshire		Britain
Yorkshire	Sír Eabhrac	Britain

== County teams ==
Counties contesting the All-Ireland Senior Football Championship (light colours), All-Ireland Senior Hurling Championship (dark colours), or both (other colours); however, almost all counties contest both the National Football League and the National Hurling League.

40 of the 46 national and overseas county teams currently compete in the Hurling and Football Championships.

GAA county	Province	Dominant sport	Hurling Championship	Football Championship
Antrim	Ulster	Hurling	Liam MacCarthy Cup	Tailteann Cup
Armagh	Ulster	Football	Nicky Rackard Cup	Sam Maguire Cup
Carlow	Leinster	Hurling	Joe McDonagh Cup	Tailteann Cup
Cavan	Ulster	Football	Lory Meagher Cup	Tailteann Cup
Clare	Munster	Hurling	Liam MacCarthy Cup	Sam Maguire Cup
Cork	Munster	Dual	Liam MacCarthy Cup	Sam Maguire Cup
Derry (Note: Derry represents County Londonderry (see Derry-Londonderry name dispute) — the GAA only uses the name Derry.)	Ulster	Football	Christy Ring Cup	Sam Maguire Cup
Donegal	Ulster	Football	Nicky Rackard Cup	Sam Maguire Cup
Down	Ulster	Dual	Joe McDonagh Cup	Tailteann Cup
Dublin	Leinster	Dual	Liam MacCarthy Cup	Sam Maguire Cup
Fermanagh	Ulster	Football	Nicky Rackard Cup	Tailteann Cup
Galway	Connacht	Dual	Liam MacCarthy Cup	Sam Maguire Cup
Gloucestershire	Britain	Football	Do not compete	All-Ireland JFC
Hertfordshire	Britain	Football	Do not compete	All-Ireland JFC
Kerry	Munster	Football	Joe McDonagh Cup	Sam Maguire Cup
Kildare	Leinster	Football	Joe McDonagh Cup	Sam Maguire Cup
Kilkenny (Note: Kilkenny no longer fields a football team.)	Leinster	Hurling	Liam MacCarthy Cup	All-Ireland JFC
Laois	Leinster	Dual	Joe McDonagh Cup	Tailteann Cup
Lancashire	Britain	Hurling	Lory Meagher Cup	All-Ireland JFC
Leitrim	Connacht	Football	Lory Meagher Cup	Tailteann Cup
Limerick	Munster	Hurling	Liam MacCarthy Cup	Tailteann Cup
London	Britain	Dual	Christy Ring Cup	Tailteann Cup
Longford	Leinster	Football	Lory Meagher Cup	Tailteann Cup
Louth	Leinster	Football	Nicky Rackard Cup	Sam Maguire Cup
Mayo	Connacht	Football	Christy Ring Cup	Sam Maguire Cup
Meath	Leinster	Football	Christy Ring Cup	Tailteann Cup
Monaghan	Ulster	Football	Lory Meagher Cup	Sam Maguire Cup
New York	North America	Football	Do not compete	Tailteann Cup
Offaly	Leinster	Dual	Joe McDonagh Cup	Tailteann Cup
Roscommon	Connacht	Football	Nicky Rackard Cup	Sam Maguire Cup
Scotland	Britain	Football	Do not compete	All-Ireland JFC
Sligo	Connacht	Dual	Christy Ring Cup	Sam Maguire Cup
Tipperary	Munster	Hurling	Liam MacCarthy Cup	Tailteann Cup
Tyrone	Ulster	Football	Christy Ring Cup	Sam Maguire Cup
Warwickshire	Britain	Hurling	Lory Meagher Cup	All-Ireland JFC
Waterford	Munster	Hurling	Liam MacCarthy Cup	Tailteann Cup
Westmeath	Leinster	Dual	Liam MacCarthy Cup	Sam Maguire Cup
Wexford	Leinster	Hurling	Liam MacCarthy Cup	Tailteann Cup
Wicklow	Leinster	Dual	Nicky Rackard Cup	Tailteann Cup
Yorkshire	Britain	Football	Do not compete	All-Ireland JFC

=== County teams outside of Ireland ===
Counties as used in Gaelic games outside Ireland cover large geographic non-traditional areas which are not considered as counties in any other context. For example, Scotland is a county for GAA purposes, as is London, while the remaining counties of Great Britain cover wider areas than their names suggest. The Hertfordshire County Board, for example, oversees clubs in Hertfordshire, Bedfordshire, Cambridgeshire and Oxfordshire; Gloucestershire GAA reaches into South Wales, Warwickshire GAA includes Staffordshire and Birmingham, and so on. There are also "county boards" for Australasia, Canada, New York, the rest of United States, Europe and Asia, while other overseas GAA regions such as the Cayman Islands operate with their own structures not including county boards.

=== London county teams ===
London county football team competes in the National Football league, Connacht Senior Football Championship, All-Ireland Senior Football Championship and Tailteann Cup. London county hurling team competes in the National Hurling League, All-Ireland Senior Hurling Championship and Christy Ring Cup.

Greatest Football achievement: Runners-up of the 2013 Connacht Senior Football Championship.

Greatest Hurling achievement: Winners of the 1901 All-Ireland Senior Hurling Championship.

=== New York county teams ===
New York enters a county team in the All-Ireland Senior Football Championship and won its first game in the 2023 Connacht football championship vs Leitrim after more than 20 years of trying. They also enter the Tailteann Cup. New York last entered the All-Ireland Senior Hurling Championship in 2006.

Greatest Football achievement: Semi-finalists of the 2023 Connacht Senior Football Championship.

Greatest Hurling achievement: Runners-up of the 2006 Ulster Senior Hurling Championship.

=== Warwickshire county teams ===
Warwickshire county hurling team competes in the National Hurling League, All-Ireland Senior Hurling Championship and Lory Meagher Cup. Their football team competes in the All-Britain Junior Football Championship.

Greatest Football achievement: Winning two All-Britain Junior Football Championships in a row in 1968 and 1969.

Greatest Hurling achievement: Winners of the 2017 Lory Meagher Cup.

=== Lancashire county teams ===
Lancashire county hurling team competes in the National Hurling League, All-Ireland Senior Hurling Championship and Lory Meagher Cup. Their football team competes in the All-Britain Junior Football Championship.

Greatest Football achievement: Winning four All-Britain Junior Football Championships in a row between 2010 and 2013.

Greatest Hurling achievement: Semi-finalists of the 1913 All-Ireland Senior Hurling Championship.

=== Other British county teams ===
Gloucestershire, Hertfordshire, Scotland and Yorkshire compete in the All-Britain Junior Football Championship.

=== Inactive county teams ===
As of 2023, no team from continental Europe, Canada, the rest of the United States, Middle East, Asia or Australasia competes against the counties of Ireland in any of the Gaelic games.

== See also ==
- Province (Gaelic games)
- County colours (Gaelic games)
- List of GAA county nicknames
