= Hurling outside Ireland =

Although many hurling clubs exist worldwide, only Ireland has a national team (though this is composed only of players from weaker counties to ensure matches are competitive). Ireland's national hurling team and the Scotland shinty team have played for many years with modified match rules in international composite rules—much like international rules football brings together Gaelic football and Australian rules football. This match is the only such international competition.

Competition at club level is growing around the world, with clubs emerging even outside of the traditional destinations of Irish emigrants such as London (London GAA), New York (New York GAA), Boston (Boston GAA), Chicago (Chicago GAA), Seattle and San Francisco (San Francisco GAA), This is 18+ only.

== Britain ==
Hurling was brought to Britain by Irish immigrants in the nineteenth century. The game is administered by Britain GAA. Warwickshire GAA compete against Irish teams in the Nicky Rackard Cup. London GAA are the only non-Irish team to have won the All-Ireland Senior Hurling Championship (having captured the title in 1901), and still compete in the Christy Ring Cup.

== Continental Europe ==
Competition at club level is growing in continental Europe with teams in several countries. In June 2006, the first ever European County Hurling team played Donegal Senior Panelists (from Setanta Hurling Club, Killygordon) in Brussels with plans to compete in the 2007 Nicky Rackard Cup.

Brussels has had a hurling team, Craobh Rua, for over 3 years and has recently formed a camogie team. Craobh Rua competes in, and in 2006 jointly won, the European Hurling Cup.

In August 2007, Camogie players from clubs in Brussels, Luxembourg and Zurich became the first Co. Europe Camogie team, and participated in the Gala All Ireland Junior B Camogie Championship. This was the first European team in any code to be admitted to an All Ireland Championship. In September 2007, the first Camogie match at a European Hurling Tournament took place in Den Haag, with a hard-fought match between Brussels and Luxembourg, in which Brussels were eventually victorious. It was envisaged that the first European Camogie Championship would take place in 2008.

There are several clubs currently active in the European Hurling League which is administered by the Gaelic Games Europe. They include Brussels, Belgium; Den Haag, the Netherlands; Luxembourg, Luxembourg; Munich, Germany; Dresden, Germany; Berlin, Germany; Darmstadt, Germany; Paris, France and Zurich, Switzerland.

The current champions of European Hurling are Belgium, who won two out of four tournaments in 2015. The second place went to the Viking Gaels.

== North America ==
One of the earliest references to the game of hurling on the North American continent dates from St. John's, Newfoundland in the 1780s. In a colony where many of the people were immigrants from County Waterford and County Kilkenny, games of hurling were common. The Catholic Bishop of St. John's, Rev. James O'Donel, complains in his letters to the Governor that faction fights would frequently break out among the audiences at games of hurling. Also, in New York City, newspaper reports from 1782 describe a Saint Patrick's Day game played in an open space behind the Jewish cemetery, remnants of which lie at 55 St. James Place in Chinatown, New York. Circumstantial evidence suggests that the players were most likely British officers from the New York garrison. After the end of the American Revolution, references to hurling cease in American newspapers until the aftermath of the Great Famine.

Newspaper reports from the 1850s refer to occasional matches played in San Francisco, Hoboken, New Jersey, and New York City. The first game of hurling played under GAA rules outside Ireland was played on Boston Common in June 1886. In 1888, an American tour by fifty Gaelic athletes from Ireland created enough interest among Irish Americans to lay the groundwork for the North American GAA. By the end of 1889, almost a dozen GAA clubs existed in America, many of them in and around New York City, Philadelphia, and Chicago. Later, clubs were formed in Boston, Cleveland, and many other centers of Irish America. American teams competed in the short lived revival of the ancient Tailteann Games in 1928 and 1932.

In 1910, 22 hurlers, composed of an equal number from Chicago and New York, conducted a tour of Ireland, where they played against the County teams from Kilkenny, Tipperary, Limerick, Dublin, and Wexford.

Traditionally a game played by Irish immigrants and discarded by their children, many American hurling teams took to raising money to import players directly from Ireland. In recent years, this has changed considerably with the advent of the Internet. Outside of the traditional North American GAA cities of New York City, Boston, Chicago, and San Francisco, clubs are springing up in places like West Lafayette, Indiana at Purdue University, Milwaukee (see Milwaukee Hurling Club), Atlanta, Charlotte, St. Louis (see St. Louis Hurling Club), Denver, Colorado, Seattle, Portland, Oregon, San Diego, Minneapolis-Saint Paul, and Nashville, TN. These clubs are different from older clubs in that they consist of predominantly American-born players who bring a new dimension to the game and actively seek to promote it as a mainstream sport.

On 31 January 2009, the first ever game of hurling to be played between two American collegiate hurling teams took place at Stanford University, California, when the Stanford team took on their rivals from UC Berkeley in a challenge game. This game was organized by the California Collegiate Gaelic Athletic Association, which is recognized by the Western Division Board as the authority for hurling teams at third level education colleges in the area. Cal won the challenge game by 3–10 to 3–9. The two teams then played a two-game aggregate series for the inaugural CCGAA Gary Duffin Memorial Cup. Stanford won the championship- the first ever collegiate cup competition in North America- winning the first match 2–10 to 1–7 on February 21, 2009, and then winning the second match 6–9 to 1–11 on April 18, 2009. Both matches were played at Páirc na nGael on Treasure Island in the middle of the San Francisco Bay.

The U.S. national collegiate hurling championship has been running since 2011.

== Argentina ==
Irish immigrants began arriving in Argentina in the 19th century, largely as gauchos and ranchers on the Pampas of Buenos Aires Province.

The earliest reference to hurling in Argentina dates from the late 1880s in the ranching town of Mercedes, Buenos Aires, a major center of the Irish-Argentine community. However, the game wasn't actively promoted until 1900 when it came to the attention of author and newspaperman William Bulfin. Under Bulfin's patronage, the Argentine Hurling Club was formed on 15 July 1900. On 17 August 1900, Bulfin printed the rules and a diagram of a hurling pitch in The Southern Cross, the official newspaper of the Argentina's Irish community. Enthusiasm spread rapidly and teams were quickly established in both the neighborhoods of Buenos Aires and the surrounding farming communities. The Passionist and Pallotine Orders took a major role in promoting the game.

Games of hurling were played every weekend until 1914 and received frequent coverage even from Argentina's Spanish language newspapers like La Nacion. After the outbreak of World War I, however, it became almost impossible to obtain hurleys from Ireland. An attempt was made to use native Argentine mountain ash, but it proved too heavy and lacking in pliability. Although the game was revived after the end of the war, the golden age of Argentine hurling had passed. World War II finally brought the era to its close.

In the aftermath of the Second World War, immigration from Ireland slowed to a trickle. In addition, native born Irish-Argentines assimilated far quicker than in other places, Hispanicising their names and frequently marrying outside the community, something unheard of in the past. Although the game continued to be occasionally played into the 1960s, it would never regain its former popularity. In 1980 the Aer Lingus Hurling Club conducted a three-week tour of the country and played matches at several locations, including the Christian Brothers school at Boulogne, Buenos Aires.

In January 2002 for the first time The Hurling All-Stars Teams 2000 y 2001 came to the Hurling Club in Argentina making an outstanding exhibition.

In February 2009 the GAA sent George O'Connor and Martin Lynch to give a Summer Camp, it was so successful that after it two more where conducted on the following years. The last summer camp was given by Damien Coleman in October 2012, who set up the foundation of the team that took part on the 2013 Gathering tournament held on Galway.

As mentioned above, in 2013 the team travelled to Galway, playing in the final which they lost for one point against the Denver Gaels from EEUU.

The Argentine Hurling Club counts now with a Hurling and a Gaelic Football team, this last one won the first World Games held in Abu Dhabi in the non-Irish division.

== Australia and New Zealand ==
The earliest known match in Australia took place in the southern winter of 1844, on 12 July, at Batman's Hill, Melbourne, according to Edmund Finn, in The Garryowen Sketches (1880). The match demonstrated hurling's affinities with Irish nationalism – Finn reported that it was organised as a riposte to an Orange march, held on the same day by a loyalist organisation. The hurling match attracted a crowd of 500, who were mostly Irish immigrants, while the extremely cold weather, according to Finn, prompted an early end to, or cancellation of, the Orange march.

In 1885, a game took place in Sydney, between two local teams, before a crowd of 10,000. These apparently included many non-Irish spectators and a local newspaper reported on the match, describing it as "Two Degrees Safer Than War."

== South Africa ==
Soldiers who served in the Irish Brigade during the Anglo-Boer War are believed to have played the game on the veld. Immigrants from County Wicklow who had arrived to work in the explosives factory in Umbogintintwini formed a team c. 1915–1916. A major burst of immigration in the 1920s led to the foundation of the Transvaal Hurling Association in Johannesburg in 1928. Games were traditionally played in a pitch on the site of the modern day Johannesburg Central Railway Station every Easter Sunday after Mass.

In 1932, a South African hurling team sailed to Ireland to compete in the Tailteann Games, where they carried a banner donated by a convent of Irish nuns in Cape Town. On their arrival, they were personally received by Ireland's president, Éamon de Valera.

South African hurling continued to prosper until the outbreak of World War II, which caused immigration from Ireland to cease and made it impossible to import equipment. Games of hurling and Gaelic football were occasionally sponsored by the Christian Brothers schools in Boksburg and Pretoria well into the 1950s. Both games have all but ceased to be played.

== Resources ==
Seamus J. King website
