= Hurling Club of Madison =

American amateur sports club

Madison
- Founded: 2007
- County: North American
- Division: Heartland Division Board
- Nickname: Hailstones
- Colours: Maroon and White
{{{kit1}}}

Madison GAA is an American amateur sports club based in Madison, Wisconsin, playing and promoting the sport of hurling. Since 2015, the club has also sponsored a Gaelic football team, adding a women's Gaelic football team in 2016 and a camogie team in 2025. The club is a member of the United States Gaelic Athletic Association, Heartland Division.

An amateur club, membership is open to players aged 16 and up, with a current age range of members from 16 to 50+. Founded in 2007 by a group led by Jason Kenney, Bill Jones, Chris Lane, Tom Isenbarger and Ben Bares, the club earned its first national hurling championship in 2015, winning the 14-team Junior C hurling tournament at the USGAA Finals in Chicago. By winning the Championship, Madison made the State of the Wisconsin the only state to have two clubs that have won the Jr. C National Championship (Milwaukee Hurling Club won in 2013).

In 2019 the club entered both a Jr. A level hurling panel and a Jr. D level hurling panel in the USGAA National Championship in Leesburg, VA. The Jr. A panel had a thrilling come-from-behind victory to win the final and the Jr. D panel, made up of nearly all American-born players, outdid all expectations and also became National Champions. It is believed to be the first time that a single hurling club has won two divisions of the North American National Tournament in the same year, repeated again by the club in 2022.

In 2021, the club captured its first Gaelic football championship at the USGAA Finals in Boston.

in 2022, the club repeated its 2019 feat of dual championships by defeating Heartland Division rival Twin Cities Robert Emmets Hurling Club and San Diego St. Peters of the Western Division, respectively, to capture the USGAA Jr. A and Jr. Reserve hurling championships in Chicago. The club returned to Chicago in 2023 to successfully defend its Jr. Reserve championship trophy by narrowly defeating the St. Louis Gaelic Athletic Club.

== Sponsorship ==
The club is recognizable by U.S. opponents and Gaelic sports enthusiasts worldwide from the Pabst Blue Ribbon-sponsored home jerseys. Progenex began sponsoring the club's alternate gray jerseys in 2013 and its equipment bags in 2016.

Since 2015, Glanbia has been the travel-jersey sponsor of the club's men's Gaelic football travel team. Glanbia also agreed in 2017 to sponsor the women's Gaelic football travel jerseys.

The Coopers Tavern, founded by Ireland native Peter McElvanna, is a sponsor of all three of the club's teams, while its league teams are sponsored by the Silver Dollar Tavern, Bristled Boar, Nitty Gritty (hurling), Glanbia and One Barrel Brewing (Gaelic football).

== Competition ==
The club competes in hurling and Gaelic football at the Intermediate, Junior A, Junior B, Junior C, Junior Reserve and Junior D levels in the Heartland Division of the United States Gaelic Athletic Association.

Since 2008, the club has hosted the Midwest Hurling Tournament each September, the longest consecutively run club-sponsored hurling tournament in America and one of the largest single-day Gaelic sports tournaments in the Upper Midwest. The tournament takes place two weeks after Labor Day weekend and is held at the Wisconsin Rugby Sports Complex in Cottage Grove, Wisconsin, a suburb of Madison. The tournament added camogie (women's hurling) and men's and women's Gaelic football matches in 2016.

In addition to its own tournament and the USGAA Finals, the hurling and football clubs host their own local summer leagues and play friendly matches against clubs from other cities. They also participate in early-season tournaments at Naperville, Illinois (April), Chicago (May), Twin Cities and Indianapolis (June). Each winter, the club hosts its indoor football and hurling leagues and travels to a tournament hosted by the Fox River Hurling Club in Green Bay, Wisconsin.

== Gaelic Football ==
The club added a men's Gaelic football team in 2015 and a women's Gaelic football team in 2016. In 2016, in its second year of competition, the Madison men's Gaelic football team reached the quarterfinals of the USGAA finals in Seattle. The women's Gaelic football team will join the men's Gaelic football and the hurling team in entering the USGAA finals in 2017 in San Francisco.

== History ==
On March 17, 2007, Jason Kenney and his brother, John, brought their hurleys, a sliotar and a sign-up sheet to the St. Patrick's Day parade at downtown Madison's Capitol Square, where they met Jones. The three held the club's first practice a few weeks later and were soon joined by Lane, Isenbarger and Bares. The first year ended with the club traveling to Milwaukee for a friendly match against a few Milwaukee Hurling Club members on a short field using small team rosters.

In 2008, the club focused on growing membership and by spring was able to participate in a developmental tournament held in Chicago. Later in 2008, the club hosted hurling clubs from Milwaukee, Minneapolis and Chicago in what has since become the annual Midwest Hurling Tournament. The 2008 and 2009 tournaments were held at Olbrich Park in Madison. In 2010, the tournament was held at Heistad Park, before moving to its permanent home at the Wisconsin Rugby Sports Complex in Cottage Grove in 2011.

In 2009, the club had its first summer hurling league with 2 teams playing 4 games on the football practice fields at James Madison Memorial High School in Madison. The club has had a summer league in each subsequent year, expanding to as many as five teams and moving games to the Wisconsin Rugby Sports Complex.

In the winter of 2011, the club held its first indoor hurling league at Hitters Sports Complex, an indoor baseball facility in Middleton, Wisconsin. After a hiatus in 2012 due to the lack of an available facility, the indoor hurling league returned in 2013 and has since been played in Middleton at the Keva Sports Center, under league sponsorship from the Club Tavern. Club Tavern Indoor Hurling league play begins each January, with the Moose Cup being awarded to the winner in early April, before the club begins its outdoor season.

To ensure safe and dry playing conditions, the club made its debut in April 2016 on the synthetic turf of Breese Stevens Field in Madison, completing a spring hurling and football league. In 2017, the club returned to Breese Stevens Field for its spring series, organizing a series of all-star matches and a triple-header and Gaelic sports expo which featured the hurling and men's and women's Gaelic football hosting visiting teams from the Milwaukee Hurling Club and Miltown Gaels.

== Championships ==
Chicago Michael Cusack Hurling Club Tournament (2012, 2013 - Jr. C division)

Fox River Hurling Club Winter Classic (2014-2016)

Twin Cities Robert Emmets Hurling Club Northstar Tournament (2014, 2023)

Indianapolis GAA Indy Invitational (hurling, Jr. C division 2015; Jr. B division 2017; Gaelic football, men's division 2016 and 2017)

United States Gaelic Athletic Association (USGAA, formerly NAC): (2023 Jr. Reserve National Champions, 2022 Jr. A National Champions, 2022 Jr. Reserves National Champions, 2019 Jr. A National Champions, 2019 Jr. D National Champions, 2015 Jr. C National Champions, 2017 Jr. C runner-up; 2014 Jr. C runner-up; )

Midwest Hurling Tournament (2014-2015, 2016 - Jr. C division, 2017 - Jr. B division, 2018 - Jr. A Division, 2019 - Jr. C Division)

== Governance ==
The club is governed by a board of directors and officers elected each fall by its general membership. Each team is managed by a code director appointed by the board of directors.

Both Kenney brothers, along with Jones, Lane and Bares have served one-year terms as the club's president.
