= North American Senior Football Championship =

The USGAA Senior Football Championship is a competition run by USGAA between Gaelic football teams from various cities in the United States. The 2026 finals were held in Boston at the Irish Cultural Centre Canton, MA.

== Roll of Honor ==
Year	Winner	Opponent
2026	Galway, Boston 1-25	Padraig Pearse, Chicago 3-11
2025	Young Irelands, Philadelphia 3–16	Galway, Boston 3–14
2024	Wolfe Tones, Chicago 3-14 (23)	Ulster, San Francisco 2-16 (22)
2023	Wolfe Tones, Chicago	Young Irelands, Philadelphia
2022	Padraig Pearse, Chicago	Young Irelands, Philadelphia
2021	Donegal, Boston	Kevin Barrys, Philadelphia
2020		
2019	Donegal, Boston 3-22 (31)	Young Irelanders, Philadelphia 5-12 (27)
2018	Donegal, Philadelphia	Young Irelands/St Brendan's, San Francisco
2017	Shannon Blues, Boston 2-11 (17)	Sean Treacy's, San Francisco 1-10 (13)
2016	Ulster, San Francisco 2-19 (25)	ISSC Vancouver, Canada 0-07 (7)
2015	McBrides, Chicago 2-11 (17)	Ulster, San Francisco 0-10 (10)
2014	Ulster, San Francisco 2-15 (21)	Shannon Blues, Boston 0-09 (9)
2013	Ulster, San Francisco 1-15 (18)	Connemara Gaels, Boston 2-09 (15)
2012	Ulster, San Francisco 2-14 (20)	Shannon Blues, Boston 2-11 (17)
2011	Aidan McAnespies, Boston 1-14 (17)	Parnells, Chicago 1-07 (10)
2010	Sean Treacys, San Francisco 5-09 (24)	Kevin Barrys, Philadelphia 0-08 (8)
2009	Christophers, Boston 4-17 (29)	Parnells, Chicago 0-07 (7)
2008	Aidan McAnespies, Boston 2-15 (21)	Sean Treacys, San Francisco 1-07 (10)
2007	St Brendan's, Chicago	Aidan McAnespies, Boston
2006	Wolfe Tones, Chicago	Aidan McAnespies, Boston
2005	Ulster, San Francisco	St Brendan's, Chicago
2004	St Brendan's, Chicago	Sons of Boru, San Francisco
2003	Cork, Boston	Donegal, Boston
2002	Wolfe Tones, Chicago	Donegal, Boston
2001	Wolfe Tones, Chicago	Connemara Gaels, Boston
2000	St Brendan's, Chicago	Cork, Boston
1999	Wolfe Tones, Chicago	
1998	Aidan McAnespies, Boston	Kerry, Boston
1997	Wolfe Tones, Chicago	
1996	Wolfe Tones, Chicago	
1995	Wolfe Tones, Chicago	Mayo Boston
1994	Cusacks, San Francisco	Donegal, Philadelphia
1993	Donegal, Philadelphia	Wolfe Tones, Chicago
1992	Donegal, Philadelphia	Wolfe Tones, Chicago
1991	Wolfe Tones, Chicago	
1990	Donegal, Philadelphia	
1989	Galway, Boston	
1988	Wolfe Tones, Chicago	
1987	Sean McBrides, Chicago	
1986	Cork, Boston	
1985	Wolfe Tones, Chicago	
1984	St Patrick's, Boston	Kevin Barrys, Philadelphia
1983	St Brendan's, Chicago	Galway, Boston
1982	Wolfe Tones, Chicago	St Brendan's Chicago
1981	St Brendan's Chicago	
1980	Wolfe Tones, Chicago	
1979	San Francisco Gaels San Francisco	Wolfe Tones Chicago
1978	Wolfe Tones Chicago	
1977	Tyrone, Philadelphia	Hibernians, San Francisco
1976	St Patrick's, Boston	
1975	Tyrone, Philadelphia	
1974	Tyrone, Philadelphia	
1973	Connemara Gaels, Boston	
1972	St Brendan's, Chicago	
1971	Tyrone, Philadelphia	
1970	Galway, Boston	
1969	Padraig Pearse, Detroit	
1968	St Pat's, Cleveland	
1967	Hartford	
1966	St Pat's, Cleveland	
1965	St Pat's, Cleveland	
1964	St Pat's, Cleveland	
1963	Galway, Boston	
1962	St Pat's, Cleveland	
1961	San Francisco	
1960	San Francisco	
1959	Los Angeles	

== Titles by Club ==
Club	Titles
Wolfe Tones, Chicago	14
St Brendan's, Chicago	5
Ulster, San Francisco	5
St Pat's, Cleveland	5
Galway, Boston	4
Tyrone, Philadelphia	4
Donegal, Philadelphia	3
Aidan McAnespies, Boston	3
Donegal, Boston	2
Young Irelands, Philadelphia	2
St Patrick's, Boston	2
Cork, Boston	2
Sean Treacys, San Francisco	2
San Francisco	2
Padraig Pearse, Chicago	1
Padraig Pearse, Detroit	1
Connemara Gaels, Boston	1
San Francisco Gaels	1
Sean McBrides, Chicago	1
Cusacks, San Francisco	1
Christophers, Boston	1
McBrides, Chicago	1
Hartford	1
Los Angeles	1
