= North American Senior Hurling Championship =

The North American Senior Hurling Championship is a competition run by North American GAA between hurling teams from various cities in the United States and Canada. Most teams come from Boston, Chicago, Philadelphia and San Francisco.

== Roll of Honor ==
Year	Winner	Opponent
2024	Tipperary, San Francisco 2-13 (19)	Na Fianna, San Francisco 1-15 (18)
2023	Tipperary, San Francisco	Galway, Boston
2022	Na Fianna, San Francisco	
2021	Galway, Boston	Fr. Tom Burkes Boston
2019	JP Ryan's, Vancouver 1-33 (36)	Na Fianna, San Francisco 5-20 (35)
2018	Tipperary, Boston	JP Ryan's, Vancouver
2017	Naomh Padraig, San Francisco 1-21 (24)	Tipperary Hurling Club, San Francisco 3-14 (23)
2016	Naomh Padraig, San Francisco 3-25	JP Ryan's, Vancouver 3-13
2015	Harry Bolands, Chicago 1-16	Naomh Padraig, San Francisco 0-15
2014	Galway, Boston 3-13	Naomh Padraig, San Francisco 2-11
2013	Na Fianna, San Francisco 0-25	Tipperary, Boston 1-09
2012	Na Fianna San Francisco 4-19	Wexford Boston 5-08
2011	Na Fianna San Francisco 3-14	Galway Boston 1-06
2010	Naomh Padraig, San Francisco 3-14	Limerick, Chicago 1-15
2009	Wexford Boston 3-15	Tipperary, Boston 2-08
2008	Limerick, Chicago 4-14	Na Fianna, San Francisco 3-13
2007	Cuchullians Chicago	Naomh Padraig San Francisco
2006	Harry Bolands, Chicago	Wexford Boston
2005	Tipperary Boston	Cuchullians Chicago
2004	Fr. Tom Burkes Boston	Cuchullians Chicago
2003	Galway Boston	Fr. Tom Burkes Boston
2002	Tipperary Boston	Cuchullians Chicago
2001	Galway Boston	Na Fianna San Francisco
2000	Cuchullians Chicago	Galway Boston
1999	Harry Bolands Chicago	
1998	Harry Bolands Chicago	Tipperary Boston
1997	Naomh Padraigh San Francisco	Cuchullians Chicago
1996	Harry Bolands Chicago	
1995	Cuchullians Chicago	Na Fianna San Francisco
1994	Cork Boston	
1993	Harry Bolands Chicago	Galway Boston
1992	Tipperary Boston	Na Fianna San Francisco
1991	Na Fianna San Francisco	
1990	Na Fianna San Francisco	
1989	Harry Bolands Chicago	
1988	San Francisco Gaels San Francisco	Harry Bolands Chicago
1987	Fr. Tom Burkes Boston	
1986	Tipperary Boston	
1985	San Francisco Gaels San Francisco	Limerick Chicago
1984	Harry Bolands Chicago	
1983	Harry Bolands Chicago	Cork Boston
1982	Cork Boston	
1981	Cork Boston	Na Fianna San Francisco
1980	Harry Bolands Chicago	
1979	St. Vincent's Chicago	
1978	St. Michael's, Toronto	
1977	Limerick Chicago	
1976	Harry Bolands Chicago	
1975	St. Michael's, Toronto	
1974	Garryowen, Toronto	
1973	Galway Boston	
1972	Harry Bolands Chicago	
1971	Harry Bolands Chicago	
1970	Garryowen, Toronto	
1969	Harry Bolands Chicago	
1968	Galway, Boston	
1967	Galway, Boston	
1966	Harry Bolands, Chicago	
1965	Garryowen, Toronto	
1964	Shannon Rangers, Chicago	
1963	Shannon Rangers, Chicago	Galway, Boston
1962	Galway, Boston	Shannon Rangers, Chicago
1961	Montreal	
1960	Los Angeles	
1959	San Francisco	
