= Continental Youth Championship =

The CYC logo showing part of an American flag, Canadian maple leaf and the GAA logo

The Continental Youth Championships (CYC) is an annual weekend tournament of Gaelic football, hurling, and camogie organized by the Gaelic Athletic Association. It is contested by teams from the US and Canada, and is a separate competition from the existing youth championships in the New York, Canadian, and NACB areas. It began in 2004, and its location rotates around various cities from year to year. The age of players ranges from Under 8 to Under 18.

== Hosts ==
The Continental Youth Championships has been hosted by:

- 2004 – New York GAA
- 2005 – San Francisco GAA
- 2006 – Boston GAA
- 2007 – Chicago GAA
- 2008 – Philadelphia GAA
- 2009 – San Francisco GAA
- 2010 – New York GAA
- 2011 – Boston GAA
- 2012 – Chicago GAA
- 2013 – Philadelphia GAA
- 2014 – New York GAA
- 2015 – San Francisco GAA
- 2016 – Chicago GAA
- 2017 – Buffalo GAA
- 2018 – Boston GAA
- 2019 – Philadelphia GAA

== Growth ==
The CYC has grown its inception. In 2006, it consisted of over 200 games played in three days. In 2014, 640 games were played in the four days. The popularity of the CYC led to a decline in the number of teams participating in the North American Youth playoffs that used to run alongside the NACB adult play-offs on the Labor Day weekend. Teams from the US and Canada take part, and British teams used to compete before the British GAA formed their own competition.

== Management ==
The CYC was developed by the GAA's Overseas Development Committee, and is managed directly from Croke Park by the CYC Steering Committee that consists of officials at Croke Park as well as members of the GAA in North America. At local level, the event is planned by the CYC Hosting Committee whose membership changes from year to year as the tournament moves from city to city.

== International play ==
The tournament used to be highlighted by international games which took place before the rest of the tournament. This showcase highlighted the USGAA team (formerly the NACB team), the London All-Stars, and the New York All-Stars representing the NYGAA.

Year	CYC Champion
2007	London
2008	London
2009	North American County Board
2010	North American County Board
