= Hoboken Guards Hurling Club =

Hoboken Guards
- Founded: 2010
- County: New York
- Colours: Red and Black
- Grounds: Hoboken and Manhattan

Playing kits
Standard colours

Hoboken Guards is a hurling club based in Hoboken, New Jersey. It is the first hurling club in the state, and was founded in December 2010. The Hoboken Guards Hurling Club offers basic skill training for males and females that are 16 years of age and older.

Hoboken Guards compete in both the New York Senior Hurling Championship and for American born hurlers in the North American GAA Tournament.

The club also partners with Liberty Gaels camogie club and Manhattan Gaels Gaelic football club.

== History ==
The club was founded in December 2010 by David Cosgrove, Conor Costigan, Declan Hogan and with the help of a number of other people.

In March 1858, a group from the Five Points in lower Manhattan celebrated Saint Patrick's Day with a game of hurling in Hoboken New Jersey - calling themselves the Kenmare Guards. It is in commemoration of this event that the hurling club in Hoboken is named the Hoboken Guards.

== Honours ==
- New York Junior Hurling Championship (1): 2017
- New York Senior Hurling Championship (3): 2018, 2019, 2020
