= John Mulhall (hurler) =

Irish hurler

Personal information
- Native name: Seán Ó MaolChathail (Irish)
- Born: 16 April 1988 (age 38) Muckalee, County Kilkenny, Ireland
- Height: 5 ft 11 in (180 cm)

Sport
- Sport: Hurling
- Position: Left corner-forward
Clubs
- Years: Club
- Muckalee; St Martin's
Club titles
	Football	Hurling
Kilkenny titles	4	0
Inter-county*
Years	County	Apps (scores)
2009-2012	Kilkenny	7 (0-01)
Inter-county titles
- Leinster titles: 2
- All-Irelands: 1
- NHL: 2
- All Stars: 0
- *Inter County team apps and scores correct as of 17:45, 7 September 2012.

John Mulhall (born 16 April 1988) is an Irish hurler who played as a left corner-forward for the Kilkenny senior team.

Mulhall made his first appearance for the team during the 2009 Walsh Cup and became a regular impact sub over subsequent seasons until he left the panel prior to the 2012 championship. During that time he won one All-Ireland winners' medal and two Leinster winners' medals. He ended up as an All-Ireland runner-up on one occasion.

At club level Mulhall plays with the St Martin's club.

== Playing career ==
=== Minor and under-21 ===
Mulhall first tasted success on the inter-county scene as a member of the Kilkenny minor hurling team in 2006. That year he won a Leinster winners' medal following a crushing 4–22 to 1–5 defeat of Carlow. Kilkenny were later defeated in the All-Ireland semi-final.

By 2008 Mulhall was entering his second season as a member of the Kilkenny under-21 team. He won a Leinster winners' medal in that grade as Kilkenny trounced Offaly by 2–21 to 2–9. Mulhall later won an All-Ireland winners' medal following a 2–13 to 0–15 defeat of Tipperary.

Kilkenny retained their Leinster title in 2009 following a 2–20 to 1–19 defeat of Dublin. A second All-Ireland final appearance for Mulhall soon followed, with Clare providing the opposition. A close game developed, however, Mulhall ended up on the losing side by just a single point.

=== Senior ===
Mulhall made his debut for the Kilkenny senior team during the 2010 National League and became a regular substitute during the subsequent championship campaign. He won his first Leinster winners' medal that year when he came on as a late sub in the 1–19 to 1–12 defeat of Galway. Kilkenny subsequently qualified for an All-Ireland final showdown with Tipperary and the chance to make history by claiming a fifth successive championship. Mulhall was introduced as a substitute for T. J. Reid, his point from near the sideline and over his shoulder in the 67th minute was one of the finest scores in the 2010 championship however, Kilkenny failed in their 'drive for five' attempt as Tipperary won by 4–17 to 1–18.

In 2011 Mulhall failed to break onto the Kilkenny starting fifteen once again, however, he remained a very important fringe player. He came on as a substitute in the National League final, on a day when Dublin shocked Kilkenny and won by 0–22 to 1–7. Mulhall later secured a second Leinster winners' medal following a 4–17 to 1–15 defeat of Dublin. He later came on as a substitute in All-Ireland final against Tipperary. Kilkenny started quickly and never surrendered the lead in the 2–17 to 1–16 victory. It was Mulhall's first All-Ireland winners' medal.

Mulhall left the Kilkenny senior hurling panel following the conclusion of the 2012 National League.

== Honours ==
St Martin's

- Kilkenny Under-21 'A' Club Hurling Championship (1): 2007
- Kilkenny Minor 'A' Club Hurling Championship (1): 2005
- Kilkenny Junior 'B' Club Hurling Championship (1): 2022

Muckalee

- Kilkenny Senior Club Football Championship (4): 2010, 2011, 2012, 2013
- Kilkenny Intermediate Club Football Championship (1): 2026
- Kilkenny Under-21 'A' Football Championship (2): 2004, 2007
- Kilkenny Minor 'A' Football Championship (2): 2004, 2005

Kilkenny

- All-Ireland Senior Hurling Championship (1): 2011
- Leinster Senior Hurling Championship (2): 2010, 2011
- All-Ireland Under-21 Hurling Championship (1): 2008
- Leinster Under-21 Hurling Championship (2): 2008, 2009
- Leinster Minor Hurling Championship (1): 2006
- National Hurling League (2): 2009, 2012
- Walsh Cup (2): 2009, 2012

UCC

- Fitzgibbon Cup (1): 2009

Cuchullians Chicago

- North American Senior Hurling Championship (1): 2007
- Chicago Senior Hurling Championship (1): 2007

Fr. Tom Bourkes Boston

- Boston Senior Hurling Championship (1): 2014
