= Kansas City Gaelic Athletic Club =

Irish sporting club in Kansas City

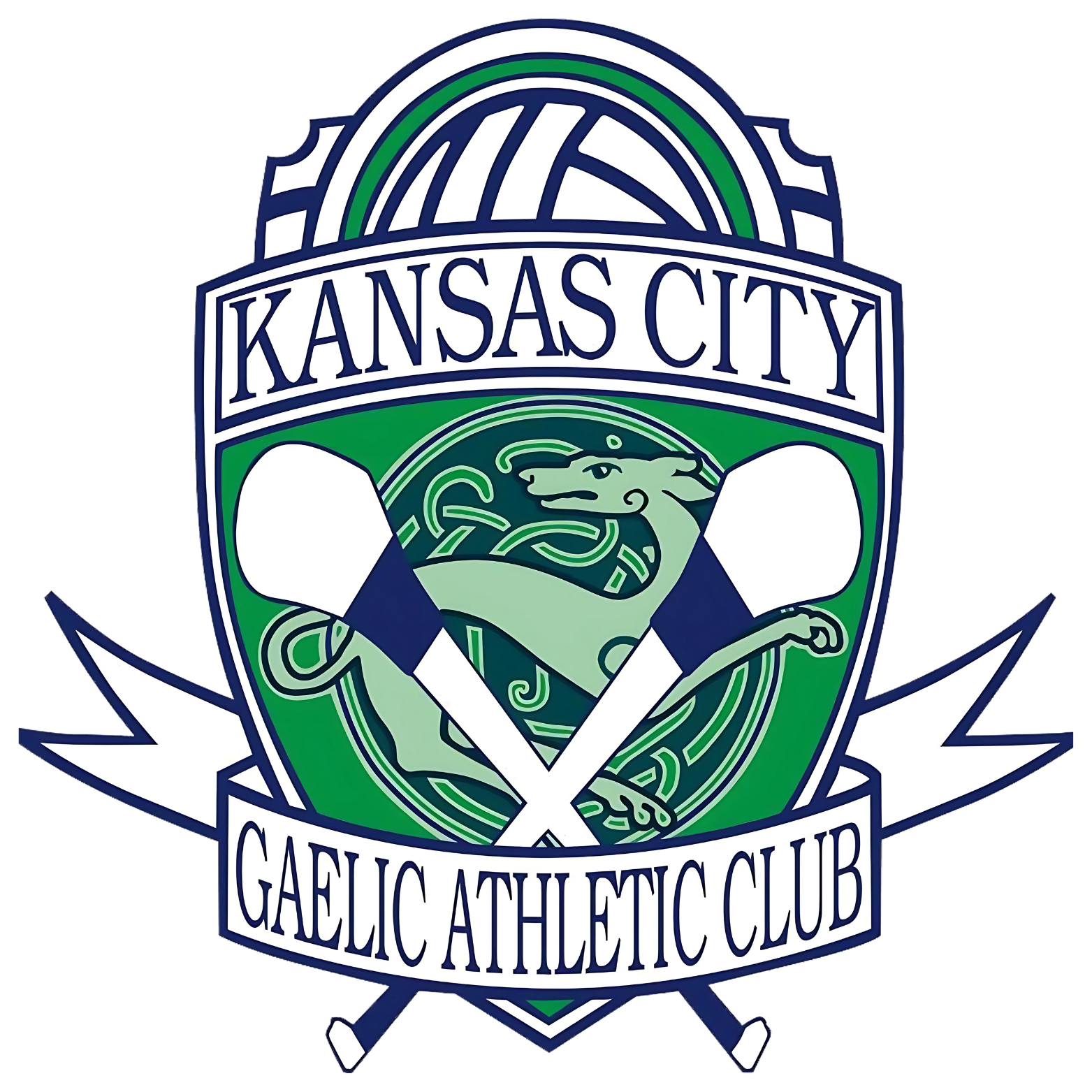
- Founded: 2008
- County: United States
- Division: Heartland Division
- Nickname: Wolfhounds
- Colours: Green; Navy; White
- Grounds: Rockhurst High School
Match Kit

Kansas City Gaelic Athletic Club (KCGAC) is a sports and cultural club that promotes the Irish sports of hurling and Gaelic football in the greater Kansas City metropolitan area.

== History ==
The club was founded in 2008 in the basement of a local church by a group of investors eager to grow Ireland's sporting culture in Kansas City. With assistance from Kansas City's Irish community, including the Kansas City folk band The Elders, the club grew in numbers and met regularly for practices at Swope Park.

KCGAC's first game came on June 28, 2008, as they competed in friendly competition in Fayetteville. They have continued to field teams to compete in regional and national competitions in hurling and Gaelic football. This included trips to the North American GAA National Championships numerous times. In 2016, KCGAC won the North American GAA Gaelic Football Junior D National Championship in Seattle. They defeated Tacoma in the final to claim the Wolfhounds' first national title in club history. After returning to Kansas City, Mayor Sly James presented the championship trophy in a celebration at Browne's Irish Marketplace.

In 2017, KCGAC served as the grand marshal of the Kansas City St. Patrick's Day Parade. It was the first time a group had ever served as the parade's grand marshal.

In 2017, Sports Joe named KCGAC's new kits the most beautiful of the year.

In recent years, KCGAC has emphasized growing the games regionally. In 2021, KCGAC met with four other teams for a hurling and Gaelic football tournament in Branson, Missouri. Since 2023, KCGAC has also travelled to Waterloo, Iowa for the Iowa Irish Fest in an effort to promote the games in Iowa.

On the pitch, KCGAC's greatest rival is the St. Louis GAC..

== See also ==
- List of Gaelic Athletic Association clubs
