= United States GAA =

Sports governing body of Gaelic games

USGAA
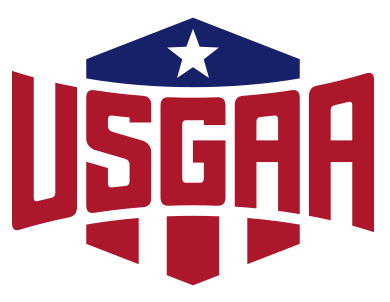
- Irish: Stáit Aontaithe
- Founded: 1950; 76 years ago
- Dominant sport: Gaelic football
- Ground(s): Gaelic Park Chicago, IL; Irish Cultural Center Boston, MA; Limerick Field Complex Philadelphia, PA; Páirc na nGael San Francisco, CA
- County colours: Red White Blue
- Website: usgaa.org

Executive
- Chairman: Paul Keane
- Secretary: Liam Moloney
- Treasurer: Olivia Rabbitte

Clubs
- Total: 171

County teams
- Football Championship: All-Ireland Junior Football Championship
- Hurling Championship: Lory Meagher Cup

The United States County Board of the Gaelic Athletic Association or USGAA, is one of the 3 county boards of the Gaelic Athletic Association (GAA) in North America, and is responsible for Gaelic games in the United States (except for the New York metropolitan area, which is administrated by the New York GAA). The county board is also responsible for the United States county teams.

== History ==
Hurling and Gaelic football have been played in North America ever since Irish immigrants began landing on North American shores. The earliest games of hurling in North America were played in St. John's, Newfoundland in 1788, and there are records of football being played in Hyde Park (now the site of the Civic Center) in San Francisco as early as the 1850s. There are established clubs in the cities that traditionally have a large Irish population, such as New York, Chicago, Philadelphia, San Francisco, and Boston.

When the North American county board was formed it included Canadian clubs in its area of control. However these clubs are now under the control of the Canadian county board.

In the late 20th century, hurling started to develop and receive support in several other U.S. cities, as evidenced by the establishment of the Milwaukee Hurling Club in 1995 and later the Twin Cities Hurling Club (MN). Other clubs include the Indianapolis Hurling Club, the St. Louis Gaelic Athletic Club and Kansas City Gaelic Athletic Club. Hurling is also starting to gather support at the club level at some universities, such as at Purdue University and Stanford University since 2005, California State University, Monterey Bay since 2006, and UC Berkeley since 2008.

Interest in Gaelic football has also developed amongst universities in America. Saint Joseph's University in Philadelphia is the first school to have an officially recognized program after running independently since 2011. Boston College's program has been running since 2011.

As of 2017, more than 51% of registered players in the United States were born there.

=== Early 21st century ===
The GAA in North America was impacted by two major developments in the early 21st century. One was the security clampdown that followed the 9/11 terrorist attacks, and the other was the growth in the Irish 'Celtic Tiger' economy. These two factors led to a reduction in the number of people travelling from Ireland to the U.S., and it became difficult for many Irish people to stay in the country legally. Additionally, many Irish emigrants returned to Ireland, where they enjoyed a high standard of living that wasn't available to earlier generations. These factors reduced the number of people playing GAA in larger U.S. cities. The trend was partially offset by growth in smaller cities. However, grassroots development has seen youth programs develop across the country and experience growth due, in part, to the success of the Continental Youth Championship.

== Competitions ==
=== USGAA Finals ===
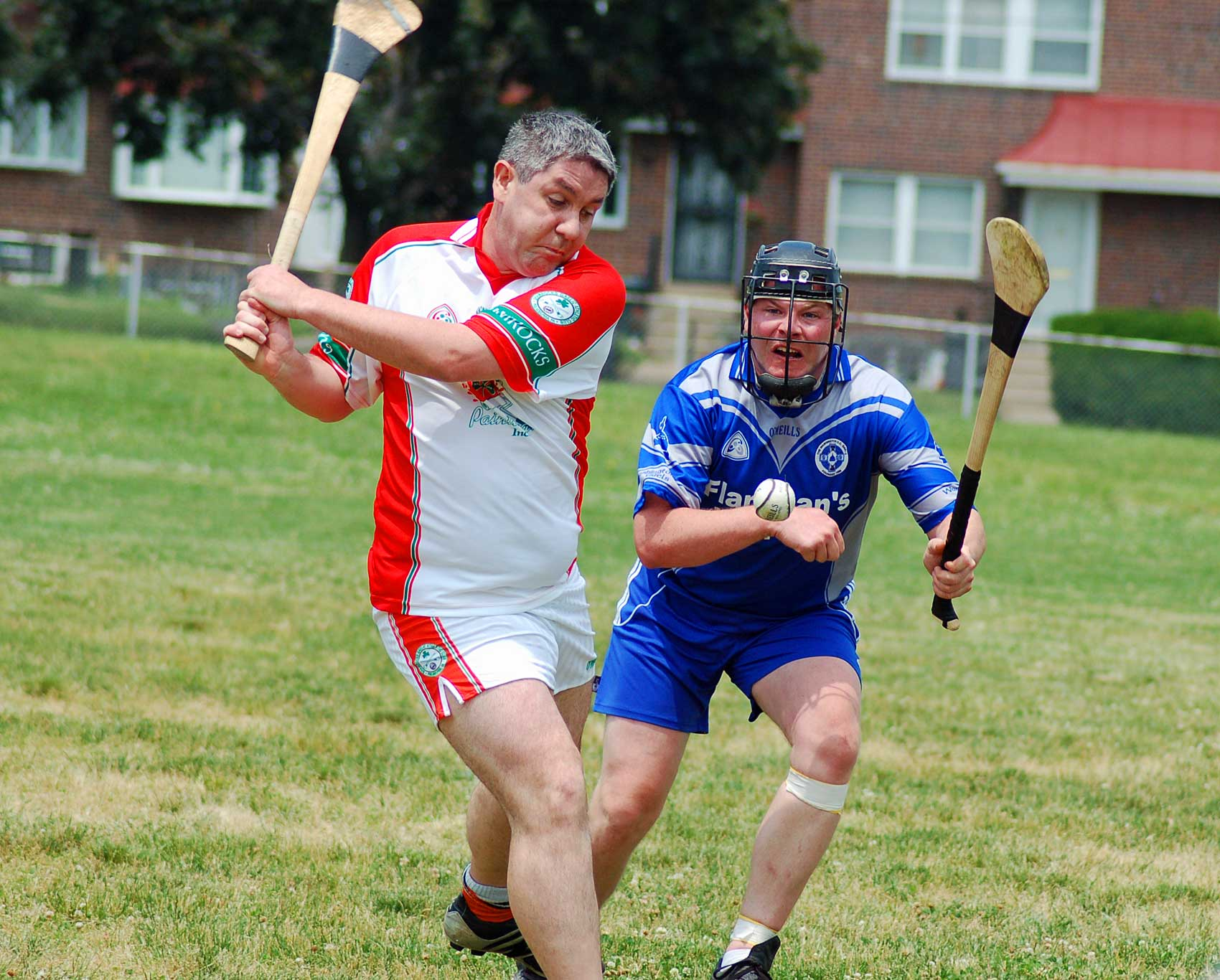
A game of hurling, DC Gaels versus Shamrocks during the Gaelic Games held in Philadelphia

Each year, the USGAA holds a championship between the clubs in all U.S. cities where there are GAA-affiliated clubs (except for New York city). Playoffs are held between the Gaelic football, hurling and camogie champions of the different regions in the United States, to determine the USGAA champions. Play off locations:

- 2028 Madison
- 2027 Chicago
- 2026 Boston
- 2025 Philadelphia
- 2024 San Francisco
- 2023 Denver
- 2022 Chicago
- 2021 Northeast (Boston, MA)
- 2019 Mid Atlantic Division (Leesburg, VA - DC Area)
- 2018 Philadelphia
- 2017 San Francisco
- 2016 Seattle
- 2015 Chicago
- 2014 Boston
- 2013 Cleveland
- 2012 Philadelphia
- 2011 San Francisco
- 2010 Chicago
- 2009 Boston
- 2008 Boston
- 2007 Chicago
- 2006 Philadelphia
- 2005 Philadelphia
- 2004 Denver
- 2003 Boston
- 2002 Chicago
- 2001 San Francisco
- 2000 Boston
- 1999 Chicago
- 1998 Rockville, MD (near Washington DC)
- 1997 San Francisco
- 1996 Boston
- 1995 Chicago
- 1994 Chicago
- 1993 San Francisco (Balboa)
- 1992 Philadelphia
- 1991 Boston (Dilboy)
- 1990 Chicago
- 1989 Cleveland
- 1988 San Francisco (Balboa)
- 1987 Pittsburgh
- 1986 Philadelphia
- 1985 Boston
- 1984 Boston
- 1983 Chicago
- 1982 Detroit

==== Grades ====
The championships are divided into different grades.

- Men:
  - North American Senior Football Championship
  - USGAA Intermediate Football Championship
  - USGAA Junior A Football Championship
  - USGAA Junior B Football Championship
  - USGAA Junior C Football Championship
  - USGAA Junior D Football Championship
  - North American Senior Hurling Championship
  - USGAA Junior A Hurling Championship
  - USGAA Junior B Hurling Championship
  - USGAA Junior C Hurling Championship
  - USGAA Junior D Hurling Championship
- Ladies:
  - USGAA Senior Ladies Football Championship
  - USGAA Intermediate Ladies Football Championship
  - USGAA Junior A Ladies Football Championship
  - USGAA Junior B Ladies Football Championship
  - USGAA Senior Camogie Championship
  - USGAA Junior Camogie Championship

=== Continental Youth Championships ===
The Continental Youth Championship (CYC) began in 2004, hosted by the New York GAA. This is an annual weekend tournament that takes place in various cities from year to year. The most recent CYC was held in July/August 2026, and was hosted by the Philadelphia GAA. CYC involves under age teams from all three of the GAA jurisdictions in North America playing football, hurling, ladies' football, and camogie at all ages from Under 8 to Under 18.

== Clubs ==
See: List of GAA clubs in North America

In 2015 in the USGAA area, there were 116 adult clubs and 14 Youth clubs playing Football, Hurling or Camogie in the US outside New York City. These clubs participated in Divisional Championship competitions to qualify for the USGAA Finals in their respective sport and grade of competition. As of 2017, Gaelic games were being organized and played in over 60 cities across the US, including:

- Akron, Allentown, PA, Albany, Albuquerque, Atlanta, Austin
- Baltimore, Boston, Buffalo, Burlingame
- Charleston, Charlotte, Chicago, Cincinnati, Cleveland, Coastal Virginia (Norfolk/Virginia Beach), Columbia, Columbus
- Cayman Islands
- Dallas, Denver, Detroit
- Fairfax, VA
- Greenville, South Carolina
- Hartford, Huntington Beach, Houston
- Kansas City, Kalamazoo, Knoxville
- Indianapolis
- Los Angeles, Louisville
- Madison, Memphis, Milwaukee
- Nashville, Naperville, New Hampshire, New Orleans
- Oakland, Orlando
- Philadelphia, Phoenix, Pittsburgh, Portland, OR, Portland, ME
- Richmond, VA, Rochester, Raleigh, NC
- San Antonio, St. Louis, St. Paul, MN, San Diego, San Francisco, San Jose, Seattle, South Bend, Syracuse
- Tampa, FL, Tacoma, Twin Cities
- Waukesha, Washington, DC, Worcester, MA, Winston-Salem, NC
