= Boston Senior Football Championship =

The Boston Senior Football Championship is an annual Gaelic football competition, played in the Boston region of America. The competition is organised by the Northeast Division Board of the Gaelic Athletic Association. The games are played at the Irish Cultural Center, in Canton, Massachusetts. The final is usually held the weekend prior to Labor Day. The winners and the runners-up will represent Boston in the North American Senior Football Championship.

== Roll of honour ==
Year	Winner	Opponent
2026	Galway 2-24	Aidan McAnespies 4-15
2025	Galway 2-17	Donegal 2-11
2024	Donegal 1-19	Connemara Gaels 0-11
2023	Donegal 1-18	Connemara Gaels 1-17
2022	Aidan McAnespies 2-12	Donegal 0-10
2021	Donegal	Connemara Gaels
2020		
2019	Donegal 2-15	Aidan McAnespies 3-09
2018	Donegal 0-17	Wolfe Tones 1-12
2017	Shannon Blues 1-15	Aidan McAnespies 0-11
2016	Wolfe Tones 3-16	Galway 2-11
2015	Donegal 1-10	Wolfe Tones 1-09
2014	Shannon Blues 1-13	Wolfe Tones 0-12
2013	Connemara Gaels 2-09	Aidan McAnespies 0-10
2012	Shannon Blues 4-13	Donegal 1-17
2011	Aidan McAnespies 2-15	Connemara Gaels 1-12
2010	Donegal 2-10	Aidan McAnespies 0-08
2009	Christophers 0-14	Shannon Blues 0-08
2008	Aiden McAnespies 4-06	Donegal 1-07
2007	Aiden McAnespies	Armagh/Notre Dame
2006	Aiden McAnespies	Connemara Gaels
2005	Aiden McAnespies	Armagh/Notre Dame
2004	Donegal	Aiden McAnespies
2003	Cork	Donegal
2002	Donegal	Aiden McAnespies
2001	Connemara Gaels	Aiden McAnespies
2000	Cork	Aiden McAnespies
1999	Kerry *	Shannon Blues
1998	Aiden McAnespies	Kerry
1997	Connemara Gaels	Aiden McAnespies
1996	Kerry 0-16	Shannon Blues 1-08
1995	Mayo	Cork
1994	Notre Dame	Connemara Gaels
1993	Kerry	Notre Dame
1992	Cork	
1991	St. Colmcille's	Kerry
1990	Shannon Blues	
1989	Galway	
1988	Cork	
1987	Shannon Blues	
1986	St. Colmcille's	
1985	Shannon Blues	
1984	St. Pat's	Galway
1983	Galway	
1982	Galway	
1981	St. Pat's	
1980	St. Pat's	
1979	Galway	
1978	St. Pat's	
1977	Tyrone (Philadelphia)	
1976	St. Pat's	
1975	Galway	
1974	Kerry*Team won by objection	
1973	Connemara Gaels	
1972	Connemara Gaels	
1971		
1970	Galway	
1969		
1968		
1967		
1966		
1965		
1964		
1963	Kerry	
1962	Cork	
1961	Galway	
1960	Kerry	
1959	Cork	
1928	Kerry	

- 1999 Kerry won on objection. Shannon Blues won final, but were disqualified for fielding illegal players.

Club	Titles	Winning Years
Galway	9	1961, 1970, 1975, 1979, 1982, 1983, 1989, 2025, 2026
Donegal	9	2002, 2004, 2010, 2015, 2018, 2019, 2021, 2023, 2024
Aidan McAnespies	7	1998, 2005, 2006, 2007, 2008, 2011, 2022
Kerry	7	1928, 1960, 1963, 1974*, 1993, 1996, 1999*
Shannon Blues	6	1985, 1987, 1990, 2012, 2014, 2017
Cork	6	1959, 1962, 1988, 1992, 2000, 2003
Connemara Gaels	5	1972, 1973, 1997, 2001, 2013
St. Pat's	5	1976, 1978, 1980, 1981, 1984
St. Colmcille's	2	1986, 1991
Wolfe Tones	1	2016
Christophers	1	2009
Mayo	1	1995
Notre Dame	1	1994
Tyrone (Philadelphia)	1	1977

== Man of the Match in Finals ==
Year	Player	Club
2026	Kevin Healy	Galway Boston
2025	Ollie Baker	Galway Boston
2024		
2023		
2022		
2021		
2020		
2019		
2018		
2017		
2016		
2015		
2014		
2013		
2012		
2011		
2010		
