= Kerry Boston GAA =

Kerry Boston GAA Club
- Founded: 1886
- County: Boston
- Colours: Green and Gold

Playing kits
Standard colours

The Kerry Boston Club are a Gaelic football club in Boston. They are one of the oldest in Boston.

== History ==
Kerry was one of the first clubs formed in Boston, along with the Galway Club.

Early history of the club is omitted. Kerry enjoyed early success; they were New England Champions in 1928. Kerry's Jim Sullivan came to Boston in 1927 after winning two All-Ireland Medals at home. He played with Kerry Boston for a number of years. Depression and wars affected the games. All-Ireland Champions, Mayo visited Boston in 1937 and played a Boston selection, which included Kerry's Jim Sullivan, Johnny Quirke and Michael Dalton from the Kerry Club.

Football was at a low ebb during World War II until things started back up in 1947. John Twomey spearheaded the club during this era. The team picture from 1949 shows many of the players that made up the 1947 team. According to the older members of the club, challenge games were played in 1947 but no championship. Kerry continued to thrive during the 1950s and started the 1960s with another championship success in 1960. A notable event in the '50s was the formation of the St. John's Club by a few of the Kerry players. The St. John's Club folded after three years.

In speaking to one of the former greats of the Kerry Boston scene, he recalled being paid $15.00 a game by the Galway Football Club during the early 1950s. In 1960 a number of players came from Ireland to live in Boston, John and Mickey Teahan, John Flynn, Gerry Lynch, Sean Garvey, Tim McGillicuddy, John Nash, Frank Donoghue, Jim Maunsell and Joe Courtney, winning the Championship the same year. However, the Kerry team was beaten in 1961 as some of the players were in the Army. The Kerry Club had another championship in 1963. The club's success in the 1960s was spurred by a new wave of immigrants.

Kerry won the 1974 championship on objection. Kerry won with the great players like Pete Nash, Kieran Whelan, Oliver Briody, John Loftus, P.J. Shaughnessy, Joe Maunsell and Joe Driscoll. The success of the club in the '70s and '80s was lean in comparison to the standards reached in the 1990s.

Kerry competed in five Senior Championships in the '90s, winning two. Over the same time span the club won two Junior Championships. The Kingdom's dominance of the Boston scene was reflected on two occasions in 1993 and again 1996 when they claimed the Senior/Junior double.

Senior Championship wins: 1993, 1996 and 1999 Junior Championship wins: 1993, and 1996

In 1997 the club became the first club in the North American Board history to field three teams, competing in Senior, Intermediate and Junior.

With the turn of the new millennium the club continues to thrive in Boston. In 2002 the Kerry club of Boston won the Intermediate Championship in Boston, and only losing by the narrowest of margins (1 point) in the North American Final in Gaelic Park in Chicago.

The following year (2003) the club went on to win the North American Junior B title.

The Kerry Club won both the Northeast Intermediate Championship and Northeast Junior B Championship in 2007.

Colm Cooper, Dara Ó Cinnéide and Pat Spillane have visited.

== Notable players ==
- John Quane - Limerick
- Anthony Tohill - Derry
- Ger Keane - Clare
- Tom Harris - Kildare
- Eamonn Breen - Kerry
- Charlie Conroy - Offaly
- Liam O'Flaherty - Kerry
- Bryan Murphy - Dublin
- Maurice Gavin - Limerick
- Anthony Gleeson - Kerry
- Noel O'Sullivan - Kerry
- Mark O'Brien - Laois
- Darren Homan - Dublin
- Pádraic Joyce - Galway
- Jonathan O Donnell - Kerry

== Honours ==
- Boston Senior Football Championship: 1928, 1960, 1963, 1974*, 1993, 1996
- Boston Intermediate Football Championship : 2002, 2007, 2022
- Boston Junior A Football Championship: 1993, 1996
- Boston Junior B Football Championship: 2003, 2007
- North American Intermediate Championship: 2008
