= New York Junior Football Championship =

The New York Junior Football Championship is a Gaelic football competition for teams affiliated with the New York (New York GAA) board of the Gaelic Athletic Association. The Junior teams play to earn promotion to Senior level. New York Senior Football Championship. The winners will usually play senior in the year after winning this championship.

== Junior A Football Championship ==
Year	Winner	Opponent
2024	Rockland 2-08	Rangers 0-09
2023	Rangers	St. Barnabas
2022	Shannon Gaels 2-08	St. Barnabas 0-12
2021	Cork 1-12	St. Barnabas 1-10
2020	Kerry 3-10	Rangers 0-12
2019	St Barnabas 6-14	Kerry 5-12
2018	Manhattan Gaels 2-13	St Barnabas 0-10
2017	Rockland 2-09 3-12 (R)	Cork 2-09 0-15 (R)
2016	Leitrim 2-12	St Raymond's 1-13
2015	Brooklyn Shamrocks 1-16	Longford 1-15
2014	Cavan 3-08	Longford 0-12
2013	St Barnabas	Cavan
2012	Celtics 1-13	Cavan 1-11
2011	Monaghan 2-12	Celtics 3-07
2010	Donegal	Monaghan
2009	Rangers 2-12	Donegal 1-09
2008	Tyrone 6-14	St Raymond's 1-06
2007	Kerry	Astoria Gaels
2006	Down	Armagh
2005	St Barnabas	Armagh
2004	Meath	Armagh
2003	Derry	St Barnabas
2002	Donegal 2-17	St Barnabas 1-7
2001	Kerry	
2000		
1999		
1998		
1997		
1996		
1995		
1994		
1993		
1992		
1991		
1990	Westmeath	
1989		
1988		
1987	Roscommon	Armagh
1986		
1985		
1984		
1983		
1982		
1981		
1980		
1979		
1978		
1977		
1976		
1975	Connemara Gaels	
1974		
1973		
1972		
1971	Waterford	
1970	Carlow	
1969		
1968		
1967		
1966		
1965	Kerry	
1964	Kerry	
1963	Kerry	
1962		
1961		
1960		
1959		
1958		
1957		
1956		
1955		
1954		
1953		
1952		
1951		
1950		
1949	Roscommon	St John's
1948		
1947		
1946		
1945		
1944		
1943		
1942		
1941		
1940		
1939		
1938		
1937		
1936		
1935		
1934		
1933		
1932		
1931		
1930		
1929		
1928		
1927		
1926	Roscommon	

2025 Shannon Gaels 2-15 Cork 1-15 AET==Junior B Football Championship==

Year	Winner	Opponent
2024	St Barnabas 3-17 (aet)	Sligo 1-18
2019	St Barnabas	
2018	St Barnabas	
2017	Rangers 0-10	Offaly 0-08
2016		
2015	Rockland 2-10	Celtics 1-08
2014		
2013	Longford 1-17	Manhattan Gaels 2-05
2012	Brooklyn Shamrocks	
2008	Offaly 0-09	Donegal 0-08
2007	Dublin 2-15	Offaly 2-06
2006	Stamford	
2005	Offaly	Dublin
2004	St Raymond's 0-12	Cavan 0-08
2003	Astoria Gaels	
2002	Westmeath	
2001	St Barnabas	
2000	Kerry	
1999	Sligo	
1998	Rockland	
1997	Mayo	
1996	Fermanagh	
1995	Westput Gaels	
1994	Longford	
1993	Connemara Gaels	
1992	Kerry	
1991	Éire Óg	
