= Northeast Division =

Northeast Division may refer to:

- Northeast Division (NHL)
- Northeast Division (PIHA)
- Northeast Division Board
