= Boston Senior Hurling Championship =

Annual competition in Boston, United States

The Boston Senior Hurling Championship is an annual hurling competition, played in the Boston region of the USA. Organised by the Northeast Division Board of the Gaelic Athletic Association, the final is usually held the weekend prior to Labor Day. The winners and the runners-up will represent Boston in the North American Senior Hurling Championship.

== Roll of honour ==
| Year | Winner | Opponent |
|---|---|---|
| 2025 | Galway 1-30 | Fr. Tom Burke's 1-17 |
| 2024 | Galway | Fr. Tom Burke’s |
| 2023 | Galway | Fr. Tom Burke's |
| 2022 | Galway 4-23 | Fr. Tom Burke's 3-13 |
| 2021 | Galway 2-16 | Fr. Tom Burke's 2-14 |
| 2020 | | |
| 2019 | Fr. Tom Burke's 2-18 | Galway 0-21 |
| 2018 | Tipperary 3-20 | Fr. Tom Burke's 0-16 |
| 2017 | Fr. Tom Burke's 1-14 | Galway 2-8 |
| 2016 | Galway 3-12 | Tipperary 1-10 |
| 2015 | Tipperary 2-25 | Fr. Tom Burke's 0-16 |
| 2014 | Fr. Tom Burke's 3-13 | Galway 1-11 |
| 2013 | Tipperary 2-19 | Galway 3-13 |
| 2012 | Wexford 3-14 | Galway 0-20 |
| 2011 | Galway 1-11 | Wexford 1-10 |
| 2010 | Tipperary 3-15 | Galway 2-08 |
| 2009 | Tipperary 0-14 | Wexford 1-09 |
| 2008 | Wexford 1-20 | Tipperary 2-16 |
| 2007 | Wexford | Tipperary |
| 2006 | Wexford | Fr. Tom Burke's |
| 2005 | Tipperary | Fr. Tom Burke's |
| 2004 | Fr. Tom Burke's | Tipperary |
| 2003 | Fr. Tom Burke's | Galway |
| 2002 | Tipperary | Fr. Tom Burke's |
| 2001 | Galway | Tipperary |
| 2000 | Galway | Tipperary |
| 1999 | Tipperary | |
| 1998 | Tipperary | |
| 1997 | Tipperary | |
| 1996 | Galway | Tipperary |
| 1995 | Fr. Tom Burke's | |
| 1994 | Galway | |
| 1993 | Galway | |
| 1992 | Tipperary | |
| 1991 | Galway | Fr. Tom Burke's |
| 1990 | Cork | |
| 1989 | Cork | |
| 1988 | Galway | Cork |
| 1987 | Fr. Tom Burke's | Cork |
| 1986 | Tipperary | Cork |
| 1985 | Tipperary | Cork |
| 1984 | Cork | |
| 1983 | Fr. Tom Burke's | |
| 1982 | Cork | |
| 1981 | Cork | |
| 1980 | Fr. Tom Burke's | Cork |
| 1979 | Galway | |
| 1978 | Galway | |
| 1977 | Galway | |
| 1976 | Cork | Galway |
| 1975 | Galway | |
| 1974 | | |
| 1973 | Galway | |
| 1972 | | |
| 1971 | | |
| 1970 | | |
| 1969 | | |
| 1968 | Galway | |
| 1967 | Galway | |
| 1966 | | |
| 1965 | | |
| 1964 | Galway | |
| 1963 | | |
| 1962 | Galway | |
| 1961 | Fr. Tom Burke's | |
| 1960 | | |
| 1959 | Fr. Tom Burke's | |
| 1919 | Redmonds | |
