= Kerry GAA =

Governing body of Gaelic games in County Kerry

- Irish: Ciarraí
- Nickname(s): The Kingdom, The Green and Gold
- Province: Munster
- Dominant sport: Gaelic football
- Ground(s): Fitzgerald Stadium; Austin Stack Park; Currans
- County colours: Green Gold

County teams
- NFL: Division 1
- NHL: Division 2A
- Football Championship: Sam Maguire Cup
- Hurling Championship: Joe McDonagh Cup
- Ladies' Gaelic football: Brendan Martin Cup

The Kerry County Board of the Gaelic Athletic Association (GAA), or Kerry GAA, is one of the 32 county boards of the GAA in Ireland. It is responsible for Gaelic games in County Kerry, and for the Kerry county teams.

The Kerry branch of the Gaelic Athletic Association was founded in 1888. Football is the dominant sport in the county, with both the men's and women's teams among the strongest in the country at senior level. The county football team was the fourth from the province of Munster to win an All-Ireland Senior Football Championship (SFC), as well as to appear in the final, following Limerick, Tipperary and Cork. Kerry is the most successful in the history of the All-Ireland SFC, topping the list of counties for All-Irelands won. It has won the competition on 39 occasions, including two four-in-a-rows (1929–1932, 1978–1981) and two three-in-a-rows (1939–1941, 1984–1986). It has also lost more finals than any other county (23).

The county hurling team won an All-Ireland Senior Hurling Championship (SHC) title in 1891, but is no longer capable of competing at this level. The team instead competes in the sport's secondary inter-county competition, the Joe McDonagh Cup. The camogie team does not compete at senior level.

== Club competitions ==
=== County ===
- Kerry Senior Football Championship
- Kerry Senior Hurling Championship
- Kerry Club Football Championship
- Kerry Intermediate Football Championship
- Kerry Intermediate Hurling Championship
- Kerry Junior Premier Football Championship
- Kerry Junior Football Championship
- Kerry Junior Hurling Championship
- Kerry Novice Football Championship
- Kerry Minor Football Championship
- Kerry Minor Hurling Championship
- Kerry Under-21 Football Championship
- Kerry Under-21 Hurling Championship
- Kerry County Senior Football League – Divisions 1–7
- Kerry County Senior Hurling League – Divisions 1–3
- Kerry County Junior Cups;

– Molyneaux Cup – McElligott Cup – Barrett Cup – Cahill Cup - Kerry Cup

=== Divisional championships ===
==== Football ====
- East Kerry Senior Football Championship
- Kenmare District Senior Football Championship
- Mid Kerry Senior Football Championship
- North Kerry Senior Football Championship
- South Kerry Senior Football Championship
- St Brendan’s / Tralee District Senior Football Championship
- West Kerry Senior Football Championship

==== Hurling ====
- North Kerry Senior Hurling Championship
- South Kerry Senior Hurling Championship

=== Kerry GAA divisions ===
==== East Kerry ====
- East Kerry GAA
- Kenmare GAA (District Team) (South-East Kerry)

==== Mid Kerry ====
- Mid Kerry GAA
- St Brendan's Board GAA (Tralee area)
- Tralee GAA (Tralee area - juvenile only)

==== North Kerry ====
- Feale Rangers GAA (North Kerry)
- Shannon Rangers GAA (North Kerry)
- St Kieran's GAA (Kerry) (East Kerry)

==== South Kerry ====
- South Kerry GAA

==== West Kerry ====
- West Kerry GAA

== Men's football ==
=== County team ===
Kerry are the most successful team in football history, having won the All-Ireland Senior Football Championship on 39 occasions and the National Football League 21 times. The team is also the holders of a number of distinctive records in football championship history. They have contested 59 All-Ireland Senior Football Championship Finals, the next highest participator being Dublin with 35 appearances. Kerry's record in the All-Ireland Senior Football Championship involves having played 30 of the 31 other counties, with only Kilkenny being the exception.

The traditional Irish game of caid, from which modern football developed, was especially popular in Kerry. The GAA was formed in 1884 and codified the modern rules of the game, which were soon adopted in Kerry clubs such as Laune Rangers. Despite this, the county team did not win an All-Ireland Football Championship in the nineteenth century. The 1903 title was the first won by Kerry, with them beating London in the final at a time when London were given a bye to that stage of the championship; Kerry's overall exceptional success in the game began in this period.

The Kerry team of the 1970s and 1980s were considered to be the greatest in the history of football and its manager (Mick O'Dwyer) one of the greatest of all time. Of the 20 All-Ireland finals held during those two decades, Kerry participated in 12, with victory coming on 9 occasions. During this time most other finals were won by Dublin, and there was a major rivalry between the two counties especially during the 1970s and 1980s. In 1982, Kerry came within one minute of winning an unprecedented fifth All-Ireland title in a row, only for a late goal by Offaly's Séamus Darby (controversial as manyclaimed Darby pushed the Kerry defender, Tommy Doyle, in the back) gave the title to Offaly. This goal was voted third in a poll to find the Top 20 GAA Moments.

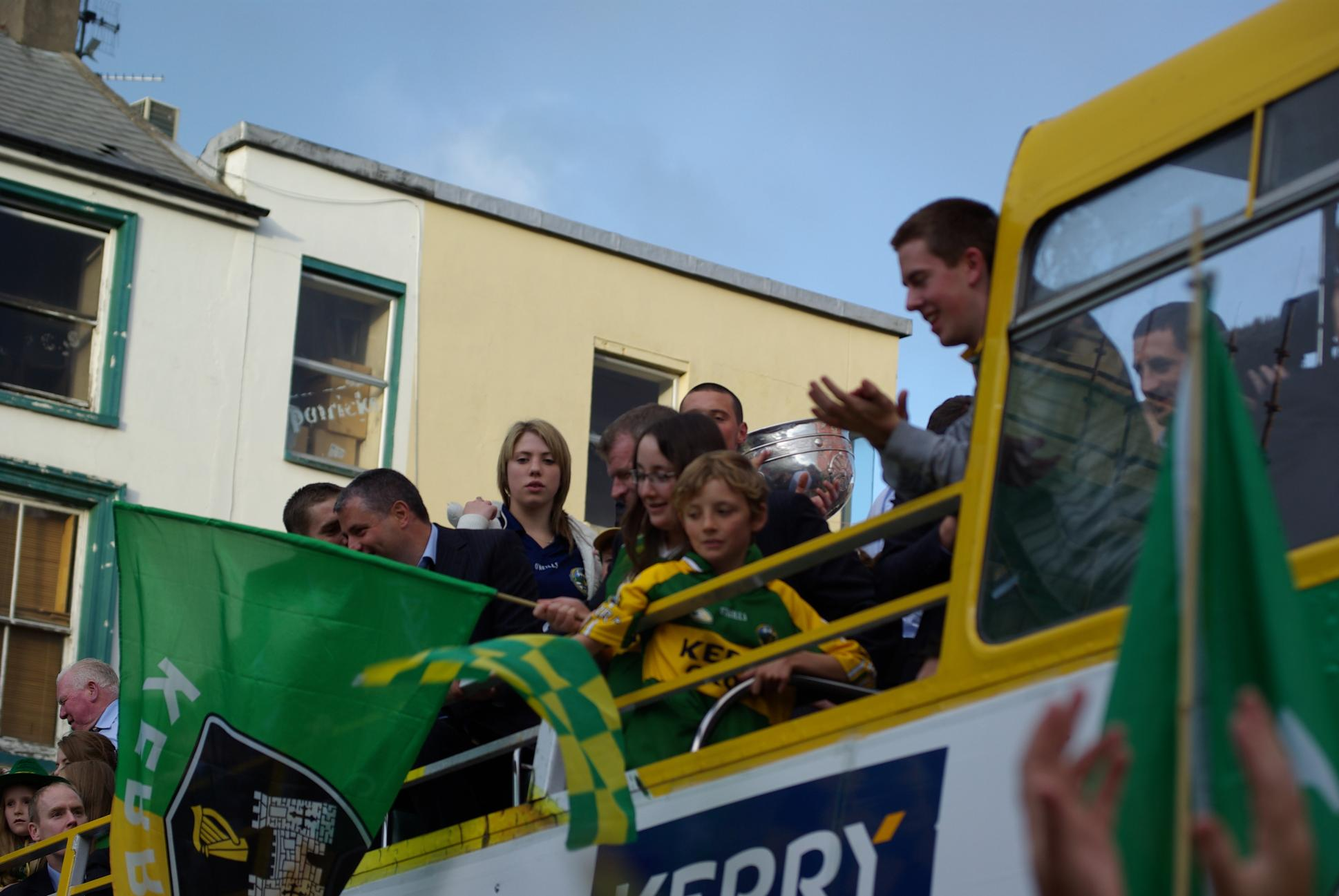
Kerry team celebrating with Sam Maguire Cup in Tralee in 2007

Towards the end of the 1980s, Kerry went into decline and did not appear in an All-Ireland final for 11 years, between 1986 and 1997. The 1997 victory, however, would mark the beginning of a revival for Kerry which spanned roughly the first decade of the 21st century. Of the 15 All-Ireland finals between 1997 and 2011, Kerry contested ten and won six, including five titles in the 2000s. In 2006 and 2007, Kerry won consecutive All-Ireland titles (the first to do so since Cork in 1989 and 1990), while in 2009, they became only the third team to reach six consecutive All-Ireland finals, winning their 36th title by beating Cork in that final. Kerry quietly exited the 2010 and 2012 All-Ireland Senior Football Championships at the quarter-final stage, losing to Down and Donegal respectively, while Dublin defeated them in dramatic fashion on the last kick in the 2011 final. Dublin were also responsible for their exit at the semi-final stage in 2013 in a closely contested classic match. Kerry won their 37th All-Ireland title in 2014 against Donegal, winning by a margin of 2–09 to 0–12. This win was notable due to Kerry's fairly young squad and a belief that Kerry were becoming unable to produce the talent they once had, after pundit Joe Brolly had suggested as such. In the aftermath of the game, Kerry player Kieran Donaghy gave a famous interview in which he directly referenced Brolly's claim that the 'production line' in Kerry had stopped, with Donaghy speaking directly to the camera and asking 'Well, Joe Brolly, what do you think of that?'. The next year, Kerry again reached the All-Ireland final, only this time to be comfortably beaten by Dublin, 0–12 to 0–9. The next two years saw Kerry bow out at the Semi-Final stage. In 2016, they were narrowly defeated by Dublin in a thrilling encounter, while in 2017 they were beaten by Mayo in a replay – their first championship defeat to Mayo in 21 years. Kerry crashed out of the 2018 championships at the group stages of the new Super Eights format. However, in 2019 Kerry reached their first All-Ireland final for four years. The first match was drawn 1–16 to 1–16, with the final to be played on 14 September.

Kerry's 2009 title was also notable since it followed the return of Tadhg Kennelly. The son of Tim Kennelly, a five-time All-Ireland winner with Kerry, and a former talented underage player with the county, he had joined the AFL's Sydney Swans and become the first Irish player to win an AFL Premiership in 2005 (the Swans' first in 72 years). Following Tim's death later that year, he elected to return to Ireland and rejoin Kerry in 2009 in pursuit of winning an All-Ireland of his own playing for the county. After he succeeded and became the first player to have won an All-Ireland and an AFL Premiership, he returned to Australia and the Swans to finish his career.

== Hurling ==
=== Clubs ===
Kerry has a shortage of hurling referees at club level. A 2020 report cited the example that, when the Kilmoyley, Lixnaw or Causeway clubs are playing Ballyduff in any game, only two referees can officiate (due to the need for an appearance of neutrality) and one of these has work commitments outside Kerry, which affects his availability.

=== County team ===
For many years the senior team played in the Junior and Intermediate Championships and had some success. They won All-Ireland titles at Junior level in 1961 and 1972, and won a Munster Championship at junior level in 1956. At Intermediate level they won Munster titles in 1970 and 1973. In 2003, team made it to the fourth round of the qualifiers only to go down to Limerick 1–14 to 0–24 in Austin Stack Park in Tralee. Along the way they beat Westmeath, Carlow and beaten Ulster finalists Derry. The wins over Westmeath and Carlow represented the first time a Kerry team strung two consecutive Championship victories together. It also marked the first occasion that the Kerry hurling team played more championship games then the Kerry football team. The advent of the Christy Ring Cup has seen Kerry become very competitive. They first made the semi-finals in 2009 where they lost out to Carlow after a replay. They went a step more in 2010 making the final but losing out to Westmeath. In 2011 they again made the final, but this time won the title with voctory over Wicklow. From 2013 to 2015 they made the final each year, losing to Down in 2013 and Kildare in 2014 before finally getting over the line thanks to victory over Derry. Kerry won the Division 2A final of the 2015 National Hurling League and advanced to the relegation/promotion match with favorites Antrim, a late point by substitute John Egan saw Kerry advance to Division 1B. In 2016, Kerry played in the Leinster Senior Hurling Championship round robin along with Carlow, Westmeath and Offaly. During the 2018 Munster Senior Hurling League Kerry recorded their first ever senior victory over Cork beating them 1-23 to 1-13 at Austin Stack Park. On 8 January 2022 Kerry recorded their first victory over Tipperary 0-17 to 0-14 in the Munster Hurling Cup quarter-final. At the time it was deemed Kerry's greatest hurling success in Austin Stack Park since they beat All-Ireland champions Clare by 3-7 to 1-8 in opening round of 1995-96 NHL.

== Ladies' football ==
Kerry have the following achievements in ladies' football.

- All-Ireland Senior Ladies' Football Championship: 12
  - 1976, 1982, 1983, 1984, 1985, 1986, 1987, 1988, 1989, 1990, 1993, 2024
- All-Ireland Under-18 Ladies' Football Championship: 3
  - 1980, 1981, 1995
- All-Ireland Under-16 Ladies' Football Championship: 5
  - 1999, 2011, 2015, 2016, 2025
- All-Ireland Under-14 Ladies' Football Championship: 7
  - 1991, 1992, 1993, 1999, 2008, 2014, 2022

== Camogie ==
Cillard and a selected Kerry team won divisional honours at Féile na nGael in 2008, 2009 and 2010.

Under Camogie's National Development Plan 2010–2015, "Our Game, Our Passion", Donegal, Kerry, Mayo and Monaghan were to get a total of 14 new clubs by 2015.

Kerry won Division 3 of the National Camogie League in 2018

Kerry won Division 2A of the National Camogie League in 2023 having defeated Meath in the Final at Croke Park in April, with Limerick man Pat Ryan leading them to a surprise success.

Clanmaurice Camogie Club from North Kerry won the 2023 All-Ireland Intermediate Club Camogie Championship. They beat Na Fianna (Meath) in the Final at Croke Park on 17 December by 1-7 to 0-7.

The first camogie board was formed in the county at the end of 2006, with Wayne Doyle of Laune Rangers elected as chairman.

Kerry senior camogie manager Bryan D'Arcy suddenly resigned ahead of his team's second game in the 2025 National League Division 2A, having managed his team in the first game of the league campaign six days previously, while head coach Paul Lillis left suddenly as well.

== Eponyms ==
Several clubs in cities worldwide use the "Kerry" or "The Kingdom" name. These include:

- Kerry Boston, based in the United States
- Kerry New York, based in the United States
- Kingdom Kerry Gaels, based in England

== Proposed museum ==
A "Kerry GAA Museum" at Fitzgerald Stadium in Killarney has been proposed. An application for planning permission was made in 2017 by Kerry Gaelic Culture Museum Ltd. This application expired in 2022.
