= New York Senior Football Championship =

- Current season or competition: 2024 New York Senior Football Championship
- Code: Gaelic football
- Founded: 1915; 111 years ago
- Region: New York (GAA)
- Title holders: Westmeath (2nd title)
- First winner: Cavan
- Most titles: Kerry (28 titles)

The New York Senior Football Championship is a Gaelic football competition for teams affiliated to the New York (New York GAA) board of the Gaelic Athletic Association. Teams are generally from the New York area, though a team from Stamford, Connecticut, has participated in recent years, and in 2006 Four Provinces represented Philadelphia. In 2007 Na Clairsigh, a club from Albany, New York, joined the 32 football teams and four hurling teams in the NY GAA.

== Roll of Honour ==
#	Team	Wins	Years won
1	Kerry	29	1925, 1933, 1934, 1939, 1941, 1944, 1945, 1946, 1949, 1950, 1951, 1952, 1953, 1954, 1956, 1959, 1960, 1962, 1963, 1966, 1967, 1999, 2004, 2005, 2006, 2008, 2013, 2014, 2024
2	Donegal	11	1973, 1978, 1985, 1986, 1988, 1991, 1992, 2000, 2001, 2002, 2015, 2017
3	Leitrim	10	1932, 1958, 1979, 1993, 1994, 1997, 1998, 2010, 2011, 2012
4	Tipperary	8	1921, 1923, 1924, 1926, 1927, 1928, 1929, 1931
5	Sligo	7	1972, 1975, 1977, 1984, 2019, 2022, 2025
6	Kilkenny	6	1917, 1920, 1922, 1947, 1961, 1965
7	Galway	5	1919, 1936, 1940, 1942, 1948
7	Tyrone	5	1970, 1971, 1980, 1981, 1983
7	Cavan	5	1915, 1943, 1982, 1984, 1990
10	Cork	4	1916, 1918, 1935, 1955
11	Monaghan	3	1968, 1969, 2016
12	Offaly	2	1957, 1964
12	Connemara Gaels	2	1976, 1989
12	Westmeath	2	1996, 2023
12	St Barnabas	2	2020, 2021
16	Fermanagh	1	1937
16	Kildare	1	1938
16	Stamford	1	2003
16	Four Provinces	1	2007
16	Down	1	2009
16	Longford	1	2018

- In 2020 and 2021, no sanctions were allowed because of the Covid-19 pandemic, therefore both St. Barnabas championship-winning teams included only American-born players

== List of finals ==
Year	Winner	Opponent
2026	Sligo 4-16	Cavan 1-13
2025	Kerry 7-19	Cavan 2-12
2024	Kerry 2-15	Westmeath 1-16
2023	Westmeath 2-15	St. Barnabas 2-10
2022	Sligo 2-11	St. Barnabas 1-13
2021	St Barnabas 1-15	Sligo 1-09
2020	St Barnabas 4-20 (R)	Sligo 4-15 (R)
2019	Sligo 0-16	Donegal 2-05
2018	Longford 0-12	Monaghan 0-11
2017	Donegal 2-13	Monaghan 1-08
2016	Monaghan 2-08	Donegal 0-11
2015	Donegal 0-16	Kerry 1-08
2014	Kerry 3-15	Leitrim 1-10
2013	Kerry	Leitrim
2012	Leitrim 2-12	Kerry 3-06
2011	Leitrim 0-18	Tyrone 1-13
2010	Leitrim	Cork
2009	Down 2-12	Cork 0-16
2008	Kerry 0-13	Down 1-09
2007	Four Provinces (Philadelphia)	Leitrim
2006	Kerry	Leitrim
2005	Kerry	Cavan
2004	Kerry	Cavan (walkover)
2003	Stamford	Donegal
2002	Donegal	Kerry
2001	Donegal	Westmeath
2000	Donegal	Kerry
1999	Kerry	Donegal
1998	Leitrim	Stamford
1997	Leitrim	Donegal
1996	Westmeath	Donegal
1995	Not awarded	
1994	Leitrim	Kerry
1993	Leitrim	Tyrone
1992	Donegal	Connemara Gaels
1991	Donegal	Leitrim
1990	Cavan	Donegal
1989	Connemara Gaels	Donegal
1988	Donegal	Cavan
1987	Not awarded	
1986	Donegal	Cavan
1985	Donegal	Sligo
1984	Cavan	Donegal
1983	Tyrone	Leitrim
1982	Cavan	Tyrone
1981	Tyrone	Cavan
1980	Tyrone	Leitrim
1979	Leitrim	Tyrone
1978	Donegal	Sligo
1977	Sligo	Donegal
1976	Connemara Gaels	Sligo
1975	Sligo	Connemara Gaels
1974	Not awarded	
1973	Donegal	Kerry
1972	Sligo	Kerry
1971	Tyrone	
1970	Tyrone	Cork
1969	Monaghan	Kerry
1968	Monaghan	Kerry
1967	Kerry	Leitrim
1966	Kerry	Galway
1965	Kilkenny	
1964	Offaly	
1963	Kerry	
1962	Kerry	
1961	Kilkenny	
1960	Kerry	
1959	Kerry	
1958	Leitrim	Kerry
1957	Offaly	Kilkenny
1956	Kerry	
1955	Cork	Kerry
1954	Kerry	
1953	Kerry	
1952	Kerry	
1951	Kerry	
1950	Kerry	Mayo
1949	Kerry	Leitrim
1948	Galway	Leitrim
1947	Kilkenny	Down
1946	Kerry	
1945	Kerry	
1944	Kerry	
1943	Cavan	
1942	Galway	
1941	Kerry	
1940	Galway	
1939	Kerry	
1938	Kildare	
1937	Fermanagh	
1936	Galway	
1935	Cork	Kerry
1934	Kerry	
1933	Kerry	
1932	Leitrim	Tipperary
1931	Tipperary	Kilkenny
1930	Mayo	
1929	Tipperary	Roscommon
1928	Tipperary	
1927	Tipperary	Mayo
1926	Tipperary	
1925	Kerry	Kilkenny
1924	Tipperary	
1923	Tipperary	
1922	Kilkenny	
1921	Tipperary	Kerry
1920	Kilkenny	
1919	Galway	
1918	Cork	
1917	Kilkenny	
1916	Cork	Kerry
1915	Cavan	Leitrim

== See also ==
- New York Senior Hurling Championship
