= New York Senior Hurling Championship =

Sporting competition

- Current season or competition: 2026 New York Senior Hurling Championship
- Code: Hurling
- Founded: 1915; 111 years ago
- Region: New York (GAA)
- No. of teams: 5
- Title holders: Westmeath (5th title)
- First winner: Galway
- Most titles: Tipperary (31 titles)

The New York Senior Hurling Championship is an annual competition between hurling clubs affiliated with the New York GAA. Most Gaelic Athletic Association clubs are based on the counties of Ireland, though sometimes players will play with a different team in New York from their own county. The final is played in Gaelic Park in the Bronx. The winning team is presented with the Michael Flannery Cup. The 2025 champions are Westmeath NY who defeated Hoboken Guards on a score of 3-21 to 3-18.

== Format ==
=== Group stage ===
Six clubs start in the group stage. Over the course of the group stage, each team plays once against the others in the group, resulting in each team being guaranteed five group games. Two points are awarded for a win, one for a draw and zero for a loss. The teams are ranked in the group stage table by points gained, then scoring difference and then their head-to-head record. The top four teams qualify for the knockout stage

=== Knockout stage ===
Semi-finals: The top four teams from the group stage contest this round. The two winners from these two games advance to the final.

Final: The two semi-final winners contest the final. The winning team are declared champions.

=== Relegation ===
The bottom-placed team from the group stage is relegated to the New York Junior A Hurling Championship.

== Teams ==
=== 2026 teams ===
The 5 teams competing in the 2026 New York Senior Hurling Championship are:

Team	Colours	Location	Position in 2025	Championship titles	Last championship title
Clare	Gold and blue	Yonkers	Group stage	10	1991
Hoboken Guards	Red and black	Hoboken	Runners-up	3	2020
Tipperary	Blue and gold	Woodlawn Heights	Semi-finals	31	2024
Waterford	Blue and white	Woodlawn Heights	Semi-finals	1	2022
Westmeath	Maroon and white	Woodlawn Heights	Champions	5	2025

Limerick withdrew from the 2025 Senior Hurling Championship due to a poor run of form and lack of numbers, and ultimately folded before the start of the 2026 championship.

== Roll of honour ==
=== By club ===
#	Team	Titles	Runners-up	Championships won	Championships runners-up
1	Tipperary	31	15	1932, 1934, 1937, 1938, 1941, 1947, 1948, 1949, 1952, 1953, 1954, 1955, 1956, 1962, 1974, 1976, 1979, 1985, 1987, 1988, 1997, 1999, 2000, 2002, 2003, 2013, 2015, 2016, 2021, 2023, 2024	1950, 1957, 1969, 1991, 1992, 1993, 1998, 2008, 2009, 2010, 2012, 2017, 2018, 2019, 2020
2	Offaly	19	3	1916, 1920, 1925, 1926, 1927, 1928, 1930, 1931, 1935, 1936, 1939, 1943, 1945, 2007, 2008, 2009, 2010, 2011, 2012	1932, 1973, 2006
3	Galway	17	7	1915, 1940, 1942, 1946, 1951, 1964, 1965, 1966, 1970, 1973, 1977, 1982, 1983, 1984, 1986, 1989, 2014	1948, 1954, 1972, 1976, 1990, 2011, 2013
4	Cork	11	5	1917, 1918, 1919, 1924, 1929, 1933, 1944, 1958, 1959, 1960, 1963	1920, 1922, 1947, 1961, 1964
5	Clare	10	2	1921, 1967, 1968, 1969, 1972, 1975, 1989, 1980, 1981, 1991	1970, 1986
6	Westmeath	5	7	1990, 1992, 1993, 1996, 2025	1987, 1988, 1989, 1994, 1995, 2001, 2024
7	Kilkenny	4	6	1922, 1923, 1950, 1957	1917, 1962, 1963, 1977, 1996, 1997
7	Limerick	4	6	1961, 1994, 1995, 1998	1936, 1960, 1978, 1999, 2000, 2004
9	Hoboken Guards	3	3	2018, 2019, 2020	2021, 2022, 2025
10	New Jersey/Kilkenny	2	1	2005, 2006	2007
11	Connecticut State	1	3	2004	2002, 2003, 2005
11	Ulster	1	2	2017	2015, 2016
11	Waterford	1	1	2022	2023
14	Laois	0	2	—	1923, 1925
14	Long Island Gaels	0	1	—	2014

=== Notes ===
- Runners-up unknown: 1915–1916, 1918–1919, 1921, 1924, 1926–1931, 1933–1935, 1937–1946, 1949, 1951–1953, 1955–1956, 1958–1959, 1965–1968, 1971, 1974–1975, 1979–1985

== List of Finals ==
=== List of New York SHC finals ===
Year	Winners		Runners-up	
Year	Club	Score	Club	Score
2026	Tipperary	3-20	Clare	1-17
2025	Westmeath	3–21	Hoboken Guards	3–18
2024	Tipperary	2–27	Westmeath	1–13
2023	Tipperary	2–22	Waterford	3–13
2022	Waterford	6–17	Hoboken Guards	2–25
2021	Tipperary	2–21	Hoboken Guards	2–18
2020	Hoboken Guards	2–22	Tipperary	2–19
2019	Hoboken Guards	3–24	Tipperary	4–18
2018	Hoboken Guards	2–29	Tipperary	2–24
2017	Ulster	3–17	Tipperary	1–14
2016	Tipperary	1–24	Ulster	2–20
2015	Tipperary		Ulster	
2014	Galway	3–19	Long Island Gaels	2–16
2013	Tipperary	2–18	Galway	1–17
2012	Offaly	4–14	Tipperary	3–15
2011	Offaly	3–23	Galway	0–12
2010	Offaly	0–16	Tipperary	0–11
2009	Offaly	2–15	Tipperary	1–10
2008	Offaly	1–18	Tipperary	0–14
2007	Offaly		New Jersey/Kilkenny	
2006	New Jersey/Kilkenny		Offaly	
2005	New Jersey/Kilkenny		Connecticut State	
2004	Connecticut State		Limerick	
2003	Tipperary		Connecticut State	
2002	Tipperary		Connecticut State	
2001	Limerick		Westmeath	
2000	Tipperary		Limerick	
1999	Tipperary		Limerick	
1998	Limerick		Tipperary	
1997	Tipperary		Kilkenny	
1996	Westmeath		Kilkenny	
1995	Limerick		Westmeath	
1994	Limerick		Westmeath	
1993	Westmeath		Tipperary	
1992	Westmeath		Tipperary	
1991	Clare		Tipperary	
1990	Westmeath		Galway	
1989	Galway		Westmeath	
1988	Tipperary		Westmeath	
1987	Tipperary		Westmeath	
1986	Galway		Clare	
1985	Tipperary			
1984	Galway			
1983	Galway			
1982	Galway			
1981	Clare			
1980	Clare			
1979	Tipperary			
1978	Clare		Limerick	
1977	Galway		Kilkenny	
1976	Tipperary		Galway	
1975	Clare			
1974	Tipperary			
1973	Galway		Offaly	
1972	Clare		Galway	
1971	Not awarded			
1970	Galway		Clare	
1969	Clare		Tipperary	
1968	Clare			
1967	Clare			
1966	Galway			
1965	Galway			
1964	Galway		Cork	
1963	Cork		Kilkenny	
1962	Tipperary		Kilkenny	
1961	Limerick		Cork	
1960	Cork		Limerick	
1959	Cork			
1958	Cork			
1957	Kilkenny		Tipperary	
1956	Tipperary			
1955	Tipperary			
1954	Tipperary		Galway	
1953	Tipperary			
1952	Tipperary			
1951	Galway			
1950	Kilkenny		Tipperary	
1949	Tipperary			
1948	Tipperary		Galway (Boston)	
1947	Tipperary		Cork	
1946	Galway			
1945	Offaly			
1944	Cork			
1943	Offaly			
1942	Galway			
1941	Tipperary			
1940	Galway			
1939	Offaly			
1938	Tipperary			
1937	Tipperary			
1936	Offaly		Limerick	
1935	Offaly			
1934	Tipperary			
1933	Cork			
1932	Tipperary		Offaly	
1931	Offaly			
1930	Offaly			
1929	Cork			
1928	Offaly			
1927	Offaly			
1926	Offaly			
1925	Offaly		Laois	
1924	Cork			
1923	Kilkenny		Laois	
1922	Kilkenny		Cork	
1921	Clare			
1920	Offaly		Cork	
1919	Cork			
1918	Cork			
1917	Cork		Kilkenny	
1916	Offaly			
1915	Galway			

== See also ==
- New York Senior Football Championship
