= St. Louis Gaelic Athletic Club =

Irish sporting club in Missouri, USA

- Founded: 2002
- County: North American
- Division: USGAA Heartland Division
- Nickname: Sons of Liberty
- Colours: Red/Black/White
- Grounds: St. Vincent Park
Kit

The St. Louis Gaelic Athletic Club (STLGAC) is an amateur Irish and international cultural and sporting club primarily focused on promoting Gaelic games in the St. Louis, Missouri metro area. The club was founded as the St. Louis Hurling Club, but changed its name to better reflect the club's participation in its three main sports; hurling, camogie, and Gaelic football.

== History ==
The club was founded in the Summer of 2002 on the south side of Tower Grove Park, by three former Milwaukee Hurling Club mates. The vision included introducing the sport of hurling to the metro St. Louis, Missouri area, creating opportunities to play the sport, developing better hurlers, and developing strong St. Louis representation in nationwide competition. Through recruitment and promotion of the sport, potential hurlers continued to join, and in Autumn 2002, small scrimmages were being held at Tower Grove.

In March 2003, the downtown and AOH-Dogtown St. Patrick's Day parades saw hurling represented for the first time in the history of St. Louis. On April 26, 2003, St. Louis played its first national match at Chicago's Gaelic Park, defeating the University of Notre Dame 3-9 (19) to 2-3 (9). A follow-up loss to Atlanta in the tournament placed St. Louis in 2nd place in its first outing as a club. Two subsequent matches against Milwaukee rounded out national competition for St. Louis in 2003.

In May 2003, the St. Louis Hurling Club received an invitation, one year ahead of their objective date, to join 21 other American cities aligned with the North American County Board (NACB). The St. Louis Hurling Club was the first association of American-born hurlers invited to join NACB in a club's first year of organization, and the second-largest club of primarily American-born hurlers in North America. A seven-members executive committee was formed on May 22, 2003, for two year terms, with the founding president's term serving as four consecutive years.

Television, radio, newspaper and magazine exposure increased the number of interested hurlers, and in September 2003, the first ever St. Louis Hurling Club season was held, an 8-week league featuring three teams: Brown & Brown Financial, Black Thorn Sons of Liberty, and McGurk's Black Shamrocks, with McGurk's defeating Brown & Brown, winning the first ever Gateway Cup on November 22, 2003. September also brought a proclamation from the Irish Consulate office, commending the club on its league and advancing the sport of hurling.

In April 2004, the club's success allowed for the addition of a fourth team, Llywelyn's Red Dragons, and began its Spring league, welcomed by the Missouri House of Representatives through a state resolution commending the club for its success. Black Thorn Sons of Liberty defeated McGurk's for the Spring league Cup on June 19, 2004. In September, the St. Louis Hurling Club traveled to Boulder, Colorado, representing St. Louis in a NACB finals tournament for the first time ever. The result included victories over Milwaukee and Seattle. The National Championship for the new Jr.-C Division belonged to St. Louis.

The St. Louis Hurling Club began its Autumn 2004 season on September 18 with a proclamation from the City of St. Louis, congratulating the club on its National Championship and commemorating the first anniversary of the inaugural league, where hurling was played among St. Louisans for the first time. Mayor Francis Slay proclaimed September 25, 2004 to be "St. Louis Hurling Club Appreciation Day".

By 2005, Gaelic football was being played at the club and the St. Louis Hurling Club was now named the St. Louis Gaelic Athletic Club. This was solidified with Gaelic Football's first National Championship in 2006. St. Louis won the Junior D Gaelic Football Championship again in 2013 at the NACB Finals in Cleveland, OH. They defeated Indianapolis (2-10 0–7), Baltimore (5-13 0–7), Houston (6-9 0–7) on the way to the championship title. In the championship they defeated a tough Buffalo side by a score of 2–4 to 0-8 and won by a late goal.

Camogie came to the club in 2008, and the club went on to win a Junior A Championship in San Francisco against San Francisco in 2024.

Currently, the club operates an eight-team hurling league (which, while co-ed, is also supplemented by a growing camogie competition) in the spring and summer and a six-team football league in the late summer and fall, hosting games at various sites throughout the St Louis metropolitan area. In addition to their representative side, they regularly join forces with other clubs in the Midwest to send teams overseas. For example, in 2013, the "Heartland Hurlers", composed of top players from St Louis, Indianapolis and Kansas City, traveled to Ireland for a week of training and competition with sides from Kilkenny, Limerick and Tipperary, finishing with a tournament in Thurles where "the Interstate 70 Boys" reached the semi-finals and received recognition from Irish TV when the group was shown during a match at Semple Stadium.

== World Games 2023 Competition ==
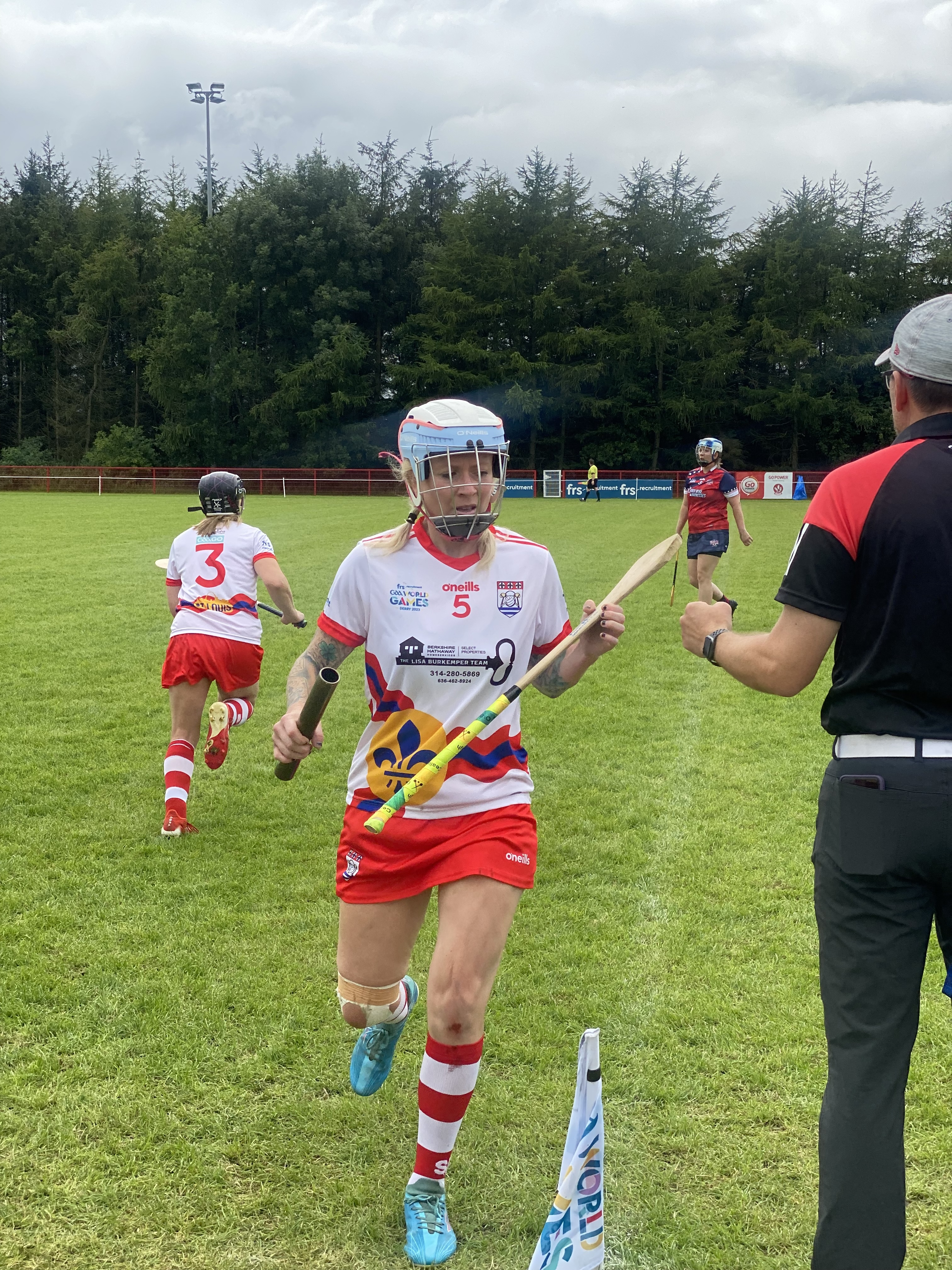
STL camogie player subbing at 2023 FRS GAA World Games

The St. Louis Gaelic Athletic Club (STLGAC) participated in the Fitzgerald Recruitment GAA World Games 2023 held at the Owenbeg Centre of Excellence in Dungiven, Derry. The club brought both a hurling team and a camogie team to compete. Their uniforms sported the St. Louis flag. This event took place on July 24, 2023, and marked a milestone for the club as they represented St. Louis in this international competition.

== See also ==
- List of Gaelic Athletic Association clubs
