= Milwaukee Hurling Club =

Milwaukee
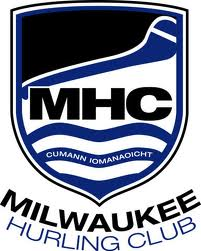
- Founded: 1996
- County: North American
- Division: Central Division Board
- Colours: Blue and White
- Grounds: Brown Deer Park
Kit

The Milwaukee Hurling Club (MHC) has promoted the sport of hurling through education and game play since 1996. The club first introduced the sport of hurling to Milwaukee in 1996 with 30 members. In 1997, four teams were formed and this enabled the club to hold regular games. From 1998 through 2001, the league featured 6 teams. The number of people playing continued growing, and by 2002 the membership grew to 160 members playing on 8 teams, as well as 30-plus members participating in camogie. In 2010, the MHC grew to over 300 members, including over 100 youth members. The Milwaukee Hurling Club's 15th season featured 10 adult co-ed teams, and 6 youth teams.

== Origins and development ==
The Milwaukee Hurling Club attempts to develop American players unlike some of the clubs in Chicago and Atlanta which bring in players from Ireland . The club is funded by the players and sponsors. While the MHC plays games among the 11 teams within the club, there are travelling teams which compete in North American Gaelic Athletic Association (NAGAA) tournaments. Specifically, there have been two men's and a women's (camogie) travelling teams. The traveling teams are made up of players who also play on the coed club teams. In 2007, the Milwaukee Men's Junior B travelling team captured its first NAGAA Championship. In 2008, The Milwaukee Men's Junior B travelling team repeated as NAGAA Champions and were due to move up to Junior A in 2009.

Due to the efforts in promoting the sport of hurling, the club administrator, Dave Olson, was honored by the GAA in Ireland with a President's Award. This was the first time that an American had been recognized with such an award.

As the MHC has grown and become more organized, it has been more involved with the NAGAA but has still maintained an independent status. The separation specifically allows for coed teams which is not allowed on official NAGAA teams. The mixed teams is generally the only difference as the MHC follows rule changes made annually by the GAA in Ireland.
