= Western Division GAA Board =

The Western Divisional Board, colloquially known as San Francisco GAA (SFGAA), is a division of the United States GAA (USGAA) covering Northern California in the United States. It is the governing body of hurling, camogie, and Gaelic football in the San Francisco Bay Area. Since its inception, games in the Western Division have been played at various venues throughout the city of San Francisco on municipal fields rented from the city, such as the Beach Chalet playing fields in Golden Gate Park, and Boxer Stadium at Balboa Park. From 2009 onward, games have been held at Páirc na nGael, a facility that was renovated and leased by the Gaelic Athletic Association (GAA) on Treasure Island.

== Competitions ==
The playing season, for clubs in the Western Division, typically runs from April until August.

Local San Francisco championship winners advance to the USGAA playoffs that take place in August. The playoffs rotate between cities such as Boston, Chicago, Denver, Philadelphia, and San Francisco. A number of Western Division clubs reportedly received fines for not attending the 2021 finals, in Boston, owing to the recommendations in place in the United States during the COVID-19. The USGAA finals have been held in San Francisco on several occasions, including at the Treasure Island grounds in 2011 and 2017, and at both Treasure Island and Balboa Park in 2024.

The Continental Youth Championships were held in San Francisco in 2005, 2009, 2015, and 2023.

== Grounds ==
Páirc na nGael, located on Treasure Island in San Francisco, was opened in December 2008 by GAA President Nickey Brennan. The opening was marked by a Gaelic football game that included All-Star winners, from various counties in Ireland, from 2007 and 2008.

Páirc na nGael contains three pitches fields spanning 13 acres (53,000 m^{2}). Páirc na nÓg is the name of the youth field further to the east on the island adjacent to the home grounds of the Golden Gate Rugby Club. Páirc na nGael's development was funded by financial and labor donations from the Irish community in San Francisco, and grants from the government and GAA in Ireland. An unused adjacent elementary school building was later remodeled to become a community centre and function room with funding secured from the Irish government.

== Clubs ==
Clubs within the USGAA Western Division include:

Men's football

- Eire Óg
- Pearse Og's
- Sean Treacys
- Ulster
- Young Irelanders / St Brendan's

Hurling

- Joseph Mary Plunketts
- Na Fianna
- Pearse Óg
- St. Josephs
- Tipperary Hurling Club

Ladies football

- Clan na Gael
- Fog City Harps

Camogie

- Cú Chulainn

Youth

- Irish Football Youth League
- Éire Óg
