= Philadelphia Division GAA Board =

The Philadelphia Divisional Board of the North American GAA is the governing body of hurling, camogie, ladies Gaelic football, and men's Gaelic football in the Philadelphia metropolitan area. In recent years, the Division has benefited from growth of clubs/teams in Pennsylvania and in the neighboring states of New Jersey and Delaware. It is affiliated with the USGAA North American Board. Its headquarters are at the Limerick Field Complex in Pottstown, Pennsylvania. Until the 2006 North American Convention, its territory included the Washington DC/Baltimore area.

== History ==
The first recorded evidence of the Gaelic games in Philadelphia was in 1914 when a meeting is said to have been held at Philo Celtic Gaelic Football Club.
