= Central Division GAA Board =

British musicals

The Central Divisional Board of the North American GAA is the governing body of hurling, camogie, and gaelic football in an area centered on Chicago. It is affiliated to the North American Board, and its territory was expanded in 2006 to include Milwaukee. Its headquarters are at Gaelic Park, a custom built facility for Gaelic games in the South side of Chicago. The facility has hosted major tournaments such as the North American playoffs. It hosted the 2007 Continental Youth Championships and the 2007 North American Playoffs.

The Central Divisional Board has 28 registered clubs playing Gaelic football, hurling, ladies Gaelic football, and camogie.
