= Northeast Division GAA Board =

Gaelic games governing body in Massachusetts, USA

The Northeast Divisional Board is a division of the United States GAA (USGAA) covering the Boston Metropolitan Area. It is the largest division of the USGAA, which in turn is affiliated to the Gaelic Athletic Association in Dublin, the governing body for Gaelic games (including Gaelic football, hurling, and camogie). The Northeast Divisional Board headquarters are at the Irish Cultural Center (ICC) in Canton, Massachusetts, which has hosted USGAA championships and tournaments combining the USGAA and the other two North American GAA affiliates, the New York GAA and the Canadian GAA.

== Area ==
The Irish Cultural Center covers a tract of land that includes two parking lots, four Gaelic Football/Hurling fields, a club house with a pub, snack bar, events hall, and meeting room, and a children's playground. The largest of the four fields is used for minor league football/hurling games for teams in the local area. A bridge used for entering the facility is also used for marriages.

== Recent history ==
In 2006 it hosted the inaugural Owen Treacy Cup, a game between a combined North American team, and the winners of the Tommy Murphy Cup (in this case, Louth). On the same weekend it hosted the Martin Donnelly cup, and the first ever instance of the Ulster Hurling final being played outside Ireland, (in this case New York and Antrim competed). In 2007 the ICC hosted the Continental Youth Championship, a tournament in with U-10,U-12,U-14,U16 and U-18 Gaelic Football/Hurling teams from New York, Philadelphia, and Chicago competing.

== Club competitions ==
- Boston Senior Football Championship
- Boston Senior Hurling Championship
- Intermediate Football Championship
- Junior Football Championship
- Junior Hurling Championship
