= New York GAA =

County board of the Gaelic Athletic Association

- Nickname(s): The Exiles
- Founded: 1914; 112 years ago
- Province: Connacht
- Dominant sport: Dual county
- Ground(s): Gaelic Park, New York City
- County colours: Red White Blue
- Website: gaanewyork.com

Clubs
- Total: 52

County teams
- Football Championship: Tailteann Cup
- Hurling Championship: Christy Ring Cup

The New York County Board of the Gaelic Athletic Association, or New York GAA is one of the three county boards of the Gaelic Athletic Association (GAA) in North America, and is responsible for Gaelic games in the New York metropolitan area. The county board is also responsible for the New York county teams.

The county football team competes in the Connacht Senior Football Championship and the Tailteann Cup and the county hurling team competes in the Christy Ring Cup.

== Football ==
=== Clubs ===
The two main competitions for clubs in the county are the New York Senior Football Championship and the New York Junior Football Championship.

The following football clubs are based in the county:

- Astoria Gaels (defunct)
- Saint Barnabas
- St.Bridgids
- St Patrick’s GAA (Connecticut)
- Brooklyn
- Cavan New York
- Celtics
- Cork New York
- Donegal New York
- Dutchess GAA New York
- Kerry New York
- Long Island Gaels (Point Lookout)
- Longford New York
- Manhattan
- Mayo New York
- Monaghan New York
- O'Donovan Rossa (Astoria, Queens)
- Offaly New York
- Rangers
- Raymonds
- Rockland (Orangeburg)
- Saint Patricks
- Sligo New York
- Shannon Gaels (College Point, Queens)
- St Barnabas
- Tyrone New York
- Westmeath New York
- WesPut Setanta GFC
- New York Hibernians

=== County team ===
The New York GAA has a long history in Gaelic games starting at a time of the mass immigration to New York from Ireland. The first organised hurling and football club in New York was founded in 1857. Since then football in New York has grown. At one point there were close to 40 football clubs in the New York GAA league. However, since the migration back to Ireland with that country's increasing economic prosperity (the Celtic Tiger), the number of clubs dwindled down to 31. In the past two years, the NY GAA has brought in two new teams, one (Na Clairsigh) from Albany and another (Four Provinces) from Philadelphia. But with the Meath team dropping out of the league competition due to too few players and other teams combining together, participation has declined. However, the renovation of Gaelic Park and increased participation by underage teams are measures that have been taken to increase participation again without having to rely on players imported from Ireland.

== Hurling ==
=== Clubs ===
The main competition for clubs in the county is the New York Senior Hurling Championship.

The following hurling clubs currently have Adult teams based in the county:

- Hoboken Guards
- Rockland
- Shannon Gaels
- Tipperary New York
- Waterford New York
- Westmeath New York
- Limerick New York
- Le Cheile

=== County team ===
The first organised hurling and Gaelic football club in New York was founded in 1857. In the following 30 years, the New York, Emmet, Wolfe Tone, Brooklyn, Geraldine and Men of Ireland clubs were set up. The Gaelic Athletic Association's successful North American tour had a notable effect on the growth of hurling in New York and North America in general by the end of the 19th century. At this time, the Keane Gaelic Hurling Trophy began to be awarded to the club which won the New York senior championship.

New York's county team have had a number of notable hurling achievements, particularly the 1958 win over Wexford. In 1969, New York defeated Kilkenny over two legs in the World Championship Cup.

New York won an All-Ireland Senior B Hurling Championship in 1996.

In the 2006 Ulster Senior Hurling Championship, New York scored a famous 1-18 to 1-12 win over Derry. This entitled them to take part in the Ulster final, which had to be delayed because the New York players had trouble travelling, see 2006 All-Ireland Senior Hurling Championship. The delayed game took place in Boston on Sunday October 22, 2006 as a curtain-raiser to the Interprovincial Championship football final; New York lost 2-20 – 1-14 to Antrim. New York did not play in the 2007 Ulster Senior Hurling Championship.

In November 2022, New York was confirmed as a participant in the 2023 Connacht Hurling League. New York won the Shield competition in 2023, before winning the League itself in 2024. On 22 February 2025, GAA Congress voted by 76.6% to allow New York to complete in the 2025 Lory Meagher Cup. Per Congress, the second placed team in the round robin section will play a semi-final against New York in Ireland. If New York end up winning the Lory Meagher, no team would be relegated from the Nicky Rackard to replace them, meaning the Nicky Rackard would have an extra team in it the following year with the same format as Lory Meagher applied. New York will play a semi-final every year against the second placed team. In any year that New York fails to win the semi final, they will play a relegation play-off against the bottom round robin team.

New York won the 2025 Lory Meagher Cup beating Cavan in the final at Croke Park.

=== Honours ===
- St. Brendan Cup
  - (gold) Winners (1): 1958
  - (silver) Runners-up (5): 1954, 1955, 1957, 1959, 1960
- World Championship Cup
  - (gold) Winners (1): 1969
  - (silver) Runners-up (2): 1967, 1968
- National Hurling League
  - (silver) Runners-up (10): 1949-50, 1950–51, 1951–52, 1962–63, 1963–64, 1964–65, 1965–66, 1967–68, 1969–70, 1989–90
- Nicky Rackard Cup
  - (gold) Winners (1): 2026
- Lory Meagher Cup
  - (gold) Winners (1): 2025
- All-Ireland Senior Hurling Championship
  - Quarter-Finalists (1): 1996
- All-Ireland Senior B Hurling Championship
  - (gold) Winners (1): 1996
- Connacht Senior Hurling League
  - (gold) Winners (1): 2024
- Connacht Senior Hurling League Shield
  - (gold) Winners (1): 2023
- Ulster Senior Hurling Championship
  - (silver) Runners-up (1): 2006

== Camogie ==
Camogie, a version of hurling for ladies, is also played by several clubs in New York. The 2010 camogie champion was Na Fianna who retained their title by defeating Cavan 0-17 to 1-10.

== Ladies' football ==
New York has a number of ladies' football teams. The county also fields a ladies' team in the Women's World Cup (this tournament does not include Irish sides).
